= 2009 Men's Australian Hockey League =

Tournament details
- Host country: Australia
- Teams: 8
- Venue(s): 9 (in 9 host cities)

Final positions
- Champions: (Western Australia) WA Thundersticks (8th title)
- Runner-up: (Queensland) QLD Blades
- Third place: (New South Wales) NSW Waratahs

Tournament statistics
- Matches played: 52
- Goals scored: 258 (4.96 per match)
- Top scorer(s): (Queensland) Jason Wilson (12 goals)
- Best player: (New South Wales) Brent Livermore

The 2009 Men's Australian Hockey League was the 19th edition of the men's field hockey tournament. The finals week of the tournament was held in the Tasmanian city of Hobart.

The WA Thundersticks won the gold medal for the eighth time by defeating the QLD Blades 2–1 in the final.

== Competition format ==
The 2009 Men's Australian Hockey League consisted of a single round robin format, followed by classification matches.

Teams from all 8 states and territories competed against one another throughout the pool stage in home and away matches. At the conclusion of the pool stage, the top four ranked teams progressed to the semi-finals, while the bottom four teams continued to the classification stage.

=== Point Allocation ===
All matches had an outright result, meaning drawn matches were decided in either golden goal extra time, or a penalty shoot-out. Match points were as follows:

· 3 points for a win
· 1 points to each team in the event of a draw
· 0 points to the loser of the match

== Teams ==
- (Australian Capital Territory) Canberra Lakers
- (South Australia) Southern Hotshots
- (New South Wales) NSW Waratahs
- (Tasmania) Tassie Tigers
- (Northern Territory) NT Stingers
- (Victoria (state)) VIC Vikings
- (Queensland) QLD Blades
- (Western Australia) WA Thundersticks

== Results ==
=== Preliminary round ===
Pos	Team	Pld	W	D	L	GF	GA	GD	Pts	Qualification
1	(Queensland) QLD Blades	7	7	0	0	42	13	+29	21	Semi-finals
2	(Victoria (state)) VIC Vikings	7	5	0	2	35	21	+14	15	Semi-finals
3	(Western Australia) WA Thundersticks	7	5	0	2	28	19	+9	15	Semi-finals
4	(New South Wales) NSW Waratahs	7	4	1	2	32	18	+14	13	Semi-finals
5	(Tasmania) Tassie Tigers	7	3	0	4	22	24	−2	9	
6	(Australian Capital Territory) Canberra Lakers	7	2	1	4	21	28	−7	7	
7	(South Australia) Southern Hotshots	7	1	0	6	22	42	−20	3	
8	(Northern Territory) NT Stingers	7	0	0	7	14	51	−37	0	

Source: Clearing House
Rules for classification: 1) points; 2) goal difference; 3) goals scored; 4) head-to-head result.

==== Fixtures ====
6 March 2009

WA Thundersticks (Western Australia)	3–2	(Queensland) QLD Blades
Hearn 29'; Pike 58'; Dancer 62'	Report	Wilson 29'; M. Bates 60'

Stadium:
Perth Hockey Stadium, Perth

6 March 2009

Southern Hotshots (South Australia)	4–1	(Northern Territory) NT Stingers
Boland 26'; Peris 36'; McGregor 41'; Hughes 52'	Report	Edwards 23'

Stadium:
State Hockey Centre, Adelaide

6 March 2009

NSW Waratahs (New South Wales)	1–3	(Australian Capital Territory) Canberra Lakers
Orchard 43'	Report	Wallace 27'; Turner 31'; Davidson 32'

Stadium:
Sydney Olympic Park, Sydney

6 March 2009

VIC Vikings (Victoria (state))	5–2	(Tasmania) Tassie Tigers
McLennan 17', 31'; Pollard 34', 54'; Ciriello 45'	Report	Guest 5'; Stephenson 52'

Stadium:
State Netball and Hockey Centre, Melbourne

8 March 2009

WA Thundersticks (Western Australia)	3–5	(Queensland) QLD Blades
Dancer 38', 70'; Pike 65'	Report	De Young 11', 46'; T. Bates 47', 60'; Burns 62'

Stadium:
Perth Hockey Stadium, Perth

8 March 2009

Southern Hotshots (South Australia)	5–2	(Northern Territory) NT Stingers
Hughes 15'; Petherick 20', 29'; Porter 60'; Wyld 63'	Report	Brown 25', 66'

Stadium:
State Hockey Centre, Adelaide

8 March 2009

NSW Waratahs (New South Wales)	3–1	(Australian Capital Territory) Canberra Lakers
Miller 29'; Govers 66'; Orchard 68'	Report	Wallace 10'

Stadium:
Sydney Olympic Park, Sydney

8 March 2009

VIC Vikings (Victoria (state))	1–0	(Tasmania) Tassie Tigers
Ford 13'	Report

Stadium:
State Netball and Hockey Centre, Melbourne

13 March 2009

Tassie Tigers (Tasmania)	2–4	(Queensland) QLD Blades
Cock 47'; Deavin 67'	Report	M. Bates 58', 69'; Wilson 63', 64'

Stadium:
Tasmanian Hockey Centre, Hobart

13 March 2009

VIC Vikings (Victoria (state))	7–3	(South Australia) Southern Hotshots
Simpson 14'; Pollard 16', 25'; Geraghty 19'; Ciriello 38', 48', 55'	Report	Bowden 26'; Telfer 43'; Reece 65'

Stadium:
State Netball and Hockey Centre, Melbourne

13 March 2009

WA Thundersticks (Western Australia)	2–1	(Australian Capital Territory) Canberra Lakers
Kavanagh 10'; Burcher 20'	Report	Backhus 37'

Stadium:
Perth Hockey Stadium, Perth

13 March 2009

NT Stingers (Northern Territory)	1–5	(New South Wales) NSW Waratahs
J. Lockley 52'	Report	M. Paterson 3', 65'; Butturini 12', 23'; I. Paterson 55'

Stadium:
Marrara Hockey Centre, Darwin

15 March 2009

Tassie Tigers (Tasmania)	0–4	(Queensland) QLD Blades
	Report	Cramer 10'; Gohdes 12'; T. Bates 17', 64'

Stadium:
Tasmanian Hockey Centre, Hobart

15 March 2009

VIC Vikings (Victoria (state))	6–2	(South Australia) Southern Hotshots
Ford 3'; Smyth 45'; Ciriello 48', 68'; MacKinnon 55'; Pollard 58'	Report	Petherick 29'; Peris 29'

Stadium:
State Netball and Hockey Centre, Melbourne

15 March 2009

WA Thundersticks (Western Australia)	3–0	(Australian Capital Territory) Canberra Lakers
Charlesworth 8'; Smith 30', 56'	Report

Stadium:
Perth Hockey Stadium, Perth

15 March 2009

NT Stingers (Northern Territory)	0–5	(New South Wales) NSW Waratahs
	Report	Kelly 12', 64'; Wark 26'; Miller 56'; Butturini 69'

Stadium:
Marrara Hockey Centre, Darwin

21 March 2009

NSW Waratahs (New South Wales)	2–0	(Victoria (state)) VIC Vikings
Govers 58'; I. Paterson 64'	Report

Stadium:
Sydney Olympic Park, Sydney

21 March 2009

Southern Hotshots (South Australia)	1–2	(Western Australia) WA Thundersticks
McGregor 20'	Report	Burcher 62'; Taylor 72'

Stadium:
State Hockey Centre, Adelaide

21 March 2009

Canberra Lakers (Australian Capital Territory)	2–1	(Tasmania) Tassie Tigers
Turner 21'; Backhus 60'	Report	Clifford 1'

Stadium:
National Hockey Centre, Canberra

21 March 2009

QLD Blades (Queensland)	5–1	(Northern Territory) NT Stingers
Wilson 2', 8', 67'; De Young 6'; Gohdes 35'	Report	Robertson 17'

Stadium:
Queensland State Hockey Centre, Brisbane

22 March 2009

NSW Waratahs (New South Wales)	5–1	(Victoria (state)) VIC Vikings
Butturini 31', 44'; Miller 33'; I. Paterson 61'; Orchard 66'	Report	Allan 64'

Stadium:
Sydney Olympic Park, Sydney

22 March 2009

Southern Hotshots (South Australia)	1–2	(Western Australia) WA Thundersticks
Claxton 47'	Report	Charlesworth 58'; Dancer 61'

Stadium:
State Hockey Centre, Adelaide

22 March 2009

Canberra Lakers (Australian Capital Territory)	1–4	(Tasmania) Tassie Tigers
Hinde 54'	Report	Cock 13'; Clifford 21'; West 58'; Richardson 67'

Stadium:
National Hockey Centre, Canberra

22 March 2009

QLD Blades (Queensland)	5–1	(Northern Territory) NT Stingers
Wilson 10'; M. Bates 15'; De Young 24', 39', 58'	Report	Brown 63'

Stadium:
Queensland State Hockey Centre, Brisbane

27 March 2009

Canberra Lakers (Australian Capital Territory)	0–2	(Victoria (state)) VIC Vikings
	Report	Ciriello 13', 41'

Stadium:
National Hockey Centre, Canberra

27 March 2009

NT Stingers (Northern Territory)	2–3	(Western Australia) WA Thundersticks
A. Lockley 32'; T. Carroll 51'	Report	Hearn 23', 57'; Charlesworth 42'

Stadium:
Marrara Hockey Centre, Darwin

27 March 2009

QLD Blades (Queensland)	2–1	(New South Wales) NSW Waratahs
Butler 15'; Gibbs 54'	Report	Govers 19'

Stadium:
Toowoomba Hockey Club, Toowoomba

27 March 2009

Tassie Tigers (Tasmania)	5–1	(South Australia) Southern Hotshots
Cock 7', 19', 47', 54'; Richardson 65'	Report	Wickham 39'

Stadium:
Tasmanian Hockey Centre, Hobart

29 March 2009

Canberra Lakers (Australian Capital Territory)	2–3	(Victoria (state)) VIC Vikings
Turner 4'; Wallace 52'	Report	Ford 14'; Smyth 29'; Ciriello 38'

Stadium:
National Hockey Centre, Canberra

29 March 2009

NT Stingers (Northern Territory)	0–3	(Western Australia) WA Thundersticks
	Report	Taylor 6', 19'; Boyne 41'

Stadium:
Marrara Hockey Centre, Darwin

29 March 2009

QLD Blades (Queensland)	4–1	(New South Wales) NSW Waratahs
Wilson 24', 47'; Gibbs 53'; T. Bates 70'	Report	Orchard 16'

Stadium:
Toowoomba Hockey Club, Toowoomba

29 March 2009

Tassie Tigers (Tasmania)	1–0	(South Australia) Southern Hotshots
Marshall 28'	Report

Stadium:
Tasmanian Hockey Centre, Hobart

6 April 2009

Canberra Lakers (Australian Capital Territory)	5–3	(Northern Territory) NT Stingers
Davidson 22'; Backhus 27'; Wallace 53'; Bishop 57'; D. Hotchkis 59'	Report	Brown 24'; Edwards 32', 35'

Stadium:
Tasmanian Hockey Centre, Hobart

6 April 2009

Southern Hotshots (South Australia)	1–5	(Queensland) QLD Blades
Cleghorn 42'	Report	M. Bates 2'; Wilson 8', 26'; Whetton 13'; Gohdes 22'

Stadium:
Tasmanian Hockey Centre, Hobart

6 April 2009

VIC Vikings (Victoria (state))	3–0	(Western Australia) WA Thundersticks
Ciriello 28', 68'; Pollard 57'	Report

Stadium:
Tasmanian Hockey Centre, Hobart

6 April 2009

NSW Waratahs (New South Wales)	2–1	(Tasmania) Tassie Tigers
Matheson 8', 52'	Report	Marshall 18'

Stadium:
Tasmanian Hockey Centre, Hobart

7 April 2009

Canberra Lakers (Australian Capital Territory)	6–2	(South Australia) Southern Hotshots
Hinde 20'; Davidson 33'; Turner 45', 68'; Ellis 48'; Dawson 62'	Report	McGregor 2'; Schubert 6'

Stadium:
Tasmanian Hockey Centre, Hobart

7 April 2009

WA Thundersticks (Western Australia)	3–2	(New South Wales) NSW Waratahs
Dancer 2'; Mitton 9'; Taylor 70'	Report	Kelly 54'; Poulton 61'

Stadium:
Tasmanian Hockey Centre, Hobart

7 April 2009

NT Stingers (Northern Territory)	0–4	(Tasmania) Tassie Tigers
	Report	Ockenden 5'; Marshall 61'; Deavin 65'; Carey 70'

Stadium:
Tasmanian Hockey Centre, Hobart

7 April 2009

QLD Blades (Queensland)	2–0	(Victoria (state)) VIC Vikings
Hammond 15'; Whetton 46'	Report

Stadium:
Tasmanian Hockey Centre, Hobart

9 April 2009

Southern Hotshots (South Australia)	2–5	(New South Wales) NSW Waratahs
Peris 1'; Cleghorn 44'	Report	Govers 4'; Livermore 12'; Matheson 21', 34'; Miller 32'

Stadium:
Tasmanian Hockey Centre, Hobart

9 April 2009

NT Stingers (Northern Territory)	3–7	(Victoria (state)) VIC Vikings
Spry 7'; T. Carroll 35', 64'	Report	Allan 10'; McLennan 20', 50'; Ford 51', 58'; MacKinnon 57'; Kleinschmidt 60'

Stadium:
Tasmanian Hockey Centre, Hobart

9 April 2009

QLD Blades (Queensland)	4–0	(Australian Capital Territory) Canberra Lakers
T. Bates 10'; Swann 40'; De Young 61', 68'	Report

Stadium:
Tasmanian Hockey Centre, Hobart

9 April 2009

Tassie Tigers (Tasmania)	2–4	(Western Australia) WA Thundersticks
Tremayne 67'; Cock 70'	Report	Mitton 2'; Hulbert 9'; Smith 35'; Pike 37'

Stadium:
Tasmanian Hockey Centre, Hobart

=== Classification round ===
==== Fifth to eighth place classification ====
Crossover
11 April 2009
(Tasmania) Tassie Tigers	3
(South Australia) Southern Hotshots	1
11 April 2009
(Australian Capital Territory) Canberra Lakers	2
(Northern Territory) NT Stingers (a.e.t)	3

Fifth place
12 April 2009
(Tasmania) Tassie Tigers	6
(Northern Territory) NT Stingers	2
Seventh place
12 April 2009
(South Australia) Southern Hotshots	3
(Australian Capital Territory) Canberra Lakers	2

===== Crossover =====
11 April 2009
12:00

Canberra Lakers (Australian Capital Territory)	2–3 (a.e.t.)	(Northern Territory) NT Stingers
Turner 49', 55'	Report	Edwards 16', 21'; Abbott 80'

Stadium:
Tasmanian Hockey Centre, Hobart

11 April 2009
14:00

Tassie Tigers (Tasmania)	3–1	(South Australia) Southern Hotshots
Browne 15', 29'; Ockenden 65'	Report	McGregor 3'

Stadium:
Tasmanian Hockey Centre, Hobart

===== Seventh and eighth place =====
12 April 2009
12:00

Southern Hotshots (South Australia)	3–2	(Australian Capital Territory) Canberra Lakers
Porter 13'; Peris 19'; Cleghorn 29'	Report	Bishop 52'; D. Hotchkis 62'

Stadium:
Tasmanian Hockey Centre, Hobart

===== Fifth and sixth place =====
12 April 2009
14:00

Tassie Tigers (Tasmania)	6–2	(Northern Territory) NT Stingers
Cock 12', 45', 55'; Richardson 32', 56', 60'	Report	Carroll 21'; A. Lockley 66'

Stadium:
Tasmanian Hockey Centre, Hobart

==== First to fourth place classification ====
Semi-finals
11 April 2009
(Queensland) QLD Blades	4
(New South Wales) NSW Waratahs	2
11 April 2009
(Victoria (state)) VIC Vikings	1
(Western Australia) WA Thundersticks	4

Final
12 April 2009
(Queensland) QLD Blades	1
(Western Australia) WA Thundersticks	2
Third place
12 April 2009
(New South Wales) NSW Waratahs	4
(Victoria (state)) VIC Vikings	2

===== Semi-finals =====
11 April 2009
16:00

VIC Vikings (Victoria (state))	1–4	(Western Australia) WA Thundersticks
Ford 22'	Report	Dancer 13'; Hulbert 37'; Hearn 47', 48'

Stadium:
Tasmanian Hockey Centre, Hobart

11 April 2009
18:00

QLD Blades (Queensland)	4–2	(New South Wales) NSW Waratahs
Whetton 15', 59'; Butler 17'; M. Bates 60'	Report	Govers 35'; M. Paterson 40'

Stadium:
Tasmanian Hockey Centre, Hobart

===== Third and fourth place =====
12 April 2009
16:00

NSW Waratahs (New South Wales)	4–2	(Victoria (state)) VIC Vikings
Govers 4', 10', 48'; Kelly 14'	Report	Ford 14'; Pollard 21'

Stadium:
Tasmanian Hockey Centre, Hobart

===== Final =====
12 April 2009
18:00

QLD Blades (Queensland)	1–2	(Western Australia) WA Thundersticks
Wilson 17'	Report	Dancer 11'; Mitton 22'

Stadium:
Tasmanian Hockey Centre, Hobart

== Awards ==
Player of the Tournament	Top Goalscorer	Player of the Final
(New South Wales) Brent Livermore	(Queensland) Jason Wilson	(Western Australia) Graeme Begbie

== Statistics ==
=== Final standings ===
Pos	Team	Pld	W	D	L	GF	GA	GD	Pts	Qualification
1st place, gold medalist(s)	(Western Australia) WA Thundersticks	9	7	0	2	34	21	+13	21	Gold Medal
2nd place, silver medalist(s)	(Queensland) QLD Blades	9	8	0	1	47	17	+30	24	Silver Medal
3rd place, bronze medalist(s)	(New South Wales) NSW Waratahs	9	5	1	3	38	24	+14	16	Bronze Medal
4	(Victoria (state)) VIC Vikings	9	5	0	4	38	29	+9	15	
5	(Tasmania) Tassie Tigers	9	5	0	4	31	27	+4	15	
6	(Northern Territory) NT Stingers	9	1	0	8	19	59	−40	3	
7	(South Australia) Southern Hotshots	9	2	0	7	26	47	−21	6	
8	(Australian Capital Territory) Canberra Lakers	9	2	1	6	25	34	−9	7	

Source: Clearing House

=== Goalscorers ===
There were 258 goals scored in 52 matches, for an average of 4.96 goals per match.

12 goals

- (Queensland) Jason Wilson

11 goals

- (Victoria (state)) Christopher Ciriello

10 goals

- (Tasmania) Geoffrey Cock

8 goals

- (New South Wales) Kieran Govers
- (Queensland) Liam de Young

7 goals

- (Australian Capital Territory) Glenn Turner
- (Victoria (state)) Russell Ford
- (Victoria (state)) Joshua Pollard
- (Western Australia) Brent Dancer

6 goals

- (Queensland) Michael Bates
- (Queensland) Timothy Bates

5 goals

- (New South Wales) Matthew Butturini
- (Northern Territory) Nathan Edwards
- (Tasmania) Marcus Richardson
- (Western Australia) Gregory Hearn

4 goals

- (Australian Capital Territory) Jack Wallace
- (New South Wales) Peter Kelly
- (New South Wales) Eli Matheson
- (New South Wales) Joshua Miller
- (New South Wales) Simon Orchard
- (Northern Territory) Liam Brown
- (Northern Territory) Travis Carroll
- (Queensland) Jacob Whetton
- (South Australia) Matthew McGregor
- (South Australia) Jonathon Peris
- (Victoria (state)) Alistair McLennan
- (Western Australia) Travis Taylor

3 goals

- (Australian Capital Territory) Garry Backhus
- (Australian Capital Territory) Iain Davidson
- (New South Wales) Ian Paterson
- (New South Wales) Mark Paterson
- (Queensland) Matthew Gohdes
- (South Australia) Thomas Cleghorn
- (South Australia) Richard Petherick
- (Tasmania) Phillip Marshall
- (Western Australia) Jonathon Charlesworth
- (Western Australia) Trent Mitton
- (Western Australia) Samuel Pike
- (Western Australia) Andrew Smith

2 goals

- (Australian Capital Territory) Benjamin Bishop
- (Australian Capital Territory) Kenji Hinde
- (Australian Capital Territory) Daniel Hotchkis
- (Northern Territory) Adrian Lockley
- (Queensland) Dean Butler
- (Queensland) Ryan Gibbs
- (South Australia) Scott Hughes
- (South Australia) Robert Porter
- (Tasmania) Kwandwane Browne
- (Tasmania) Adam Clifford
- (Tasmania) Timothy Deavin
- (Tasmania) Edward Ockenden
- (Victoria (state)) Angus Allan
- (Victoria (state)) Paul MacKinnon
- (Victoria (state)) Ian Smyth
- (Western Australia) Ian Burcher
- (Western Australia) Phillip Hulbert

1 goal

- (Australian Capital Territory) Dean Dawson
- (Australian Capital Territory) Justin Ellis
- (New South Wales) Brent Livermore
- (New South Wales) Benjamin Poulton
- (New South Wales) Matthew Wark
- (Northern Territory) Desmond Abbott
- (Northern Territory) Jarrod Lockley
- (Northern Territory) Angus Robertson
- (Northern Territory) Adam Spry
- (Queensland) Jacob Burns
- (Queensland) Cale Cramer
- (Queensland) Robert Hammond
- (Queensland) Matthew Swann
- (South Australia) Evan Boland
- (South Australia) Fraser Bowden
- (South Australia) Matthew Claxton
- (South Australia) Gregory Reece
- (South Australia) Grant Schubert
- (South Australia) William Telfer
- (South Australia) Thomas Wickham
- (South Australia) Ruben Wyld
- (Tasmania) Sean Carey
- (Tasmania) David Guest
- (Tasmania) Lloyd Stephenson
- (Tasmania) Nicholas Tremayne
- (Tasmania) Toby West
- (Victoria (state)) Declan Geraghty
- (Victoria (state)) Aaron Kleinschmidt
- (Victoria (state)) Glenn Simpson
- (Western Australia) Craig Boyne
- (Western Australia) Fergus Kavanagh

Source: Clearing House
