= 2013 Men's Australian Hockey League =

Tournament details
- Host country: Australia
- City: Melbourne
- Teams: 8
- Venue: State Netball and Hockey Centre

Final positions
- Champions: (Queensland) QLD Blades (8th title)
- Runner-up: (Victoria (state)) VIC Vikings
- Third place: (New South Wales) NSW Waratahs

Tournament statistics
- Matches played: 24
- Goals scored: 139 (5.79 per match)
- Top scorer(s): (Australian Capital Territory) Troy Sutherland (New South Wales) Mark Paterson (5 goals)
- Best player: (Tasmania) Eddie Ockenden

The 2013 Men's Australian Hockey League was the 23rd edition of the Australian Hockey League men's Field Hockey tournament. The tournament was held in the Victoria city of Melbourne.

The QLD Blades won the gold medal for the eighth time by defeating the VIC Vikings 3–1 in the final. NSW Waratahs won the bronze medal after defeating the Canberra Lakers 9–2 in the third place match.

== Competition format ==
The tournament is divided into two pools, Pool A and Pool B, consisting of four teams in a round-robin format. Teams then progress into either Pool C, the medal round, or Pool D, the classification round. Teams carry over points from their previous match ups, and contest teams they are yet to play.

The top two teams in each of pools A and B then progress to Pool C. The top two teams in Pool C continue to contest the Final, while the bottom two teams of Pool C play in the Third and Fourth-place match.

The remaining bottom placing teams make up Pool D. The top two teams in Pool D play in the Fifth and Sixth-place match, while the bottom two teams of Pool C play in the Seventh and Eighth-place match.

== Teams ==
- (Australian Capital Territory) Canberra Lakers
- (New South Wales) NSW Waratahs
- (Northern Territory) NT Stingers
- (Queensland) QLD Blades
- (South Australia) SA Hotshots
- (Tasmania) Tassie Tigers
- (Victoria (state)) VIC Vikings
- (Western Australia) WA Thundersticks

== Results ==
=== First round ===
==== Pool A ====
| Pos | Team | Pld | W | D | L | GF | GA | GD | Pts | Qualification |
|---|---|---|---|---|---|---|---|---|---|---|
| 1 | (Queensland) QLD Blades | 3 | 3 | 0 | 0 | 16 | 5 | +11 | 9 | Advance to Medal Round |
| 2 | (New South Wales) NSW Waratahs | 3 | 1 | 1 | 1 | 11 | 10 | +1 | 4 | Advance to Medal Round |
| 3 | (Northern Territory) NT Stingers | 3 | 1 | 0 | 2 | 8 | 10 | −2 | 3 | |
| 4 | (South Australia) SA Hotshots | 3 | 0 | 1 | 2 | 6 | 16 | −10 | 1 | |

Source: Hockey Australia

27 September 2013
17:00

| NSW Waratahs (New South Wales) | 4–4 | (South Australia) SA Hotshots |
|---|---|---|
| Pearce 1'; Butturini 40'; Paterson 53'; Miller 58' | Report | Smith 14'; Oliver 19'; Gill 35'; Joyce 64' |

State Netball and Hockey Centre

27 September 2013
19:15

| QLD Blades (Queensland) | 4–2 | (Northern Territory) NT Stingers |
|---|---|---|
| Douglas 26'; Wilson 22'; 51'; Knowles 62' | Report | Reardon 45'; Crowley 63' |

State Netball and Hockey Centre

29 September 2013
11:30

| NT Stingers (Northern Territory) | 4–2 | (South Australia) SA Hotshots |
|---|---|---|
| Haami-Jones 35'; A. Lockley 37'; Tribe 62'; Gilmour 70' | Report | Cox 14'; Wickham 32' |

State Netball and Hockey Centre

29 September 2013
13:30

| NSW Waratahs (New South Wales) | 3–4 | (Queensland) QLD Blades |
|---|---|---|
| Johnson 8'; White 9'; Butturini 48' | Report | Dwyer 24', 35'; Boyde 44'; Whetton 55' |

State Netball and Hockey Centre

1 October 2013
11:30

| QLD Blades (Queensland) | 8–0 | (South Australia) SA Hotshots |
|---|---|---|
| Whetton 3', 7'; Beale 15'; Hammond 25'; Boyde 28', 61'; Posselt 35'; Knowles 38' | Report |

State Netball and Hockey Centre

1 October 2013
13:30

| NT Stingers (Northern Territory) | 2–4 | (New South Wales) NSW Waratahs |
|---|---|---|
| Crowley 58'; A. Lockley 67' | Report | Miller 5'; Lobsey 12'; Butturini 40'; Johnson 53' |

State Netball and Hockey Centre

==== Pool B ====
| Pos | Team | Pld | W | D | L | GF | GA | GD | Pts | Qualification |
|---|---|---|---|---|---|---|---|---|---|---|
| 1 | (Victoria (state)) VIC Vikings | 3 | 3 | 0 | 0 | 13 | 2 | +11 | 9 | Advance to Medal Round |
| 2 | (Australian Capital Territory) Canberra Lakers | 3 | 2 | 0 | 1 | 11 | 6 | +5 | 6 | Advance to Medal Round |
| 3 | (Tasmania) Tassie Tigers | 3 | 1 | 0 | 2 | 5 | 15 | −10 | 3 | |
| 4 | (Western Australia) WA Thundersticks | 3 | 0 | 0 | 3 | 3 | 9 | −6 | 0 | |

Source: Hockey Australia

27 September 2013
17:15

| WA Thundersticks (Western Australia) | 2–3 | (Australian Capital Territory) Canberra Lakers |
|---|---|---|
| Bates 2'; Pike 11' | Report | Turner 39'; Kershaw 45'; Sutherland 52' |

State Netball and Hockey Centre

27 September 2013
19:00

| VIC Vikings (Victoria (state)) | 7–1 | (Tasmania) Tassie Tigers |
|---|---|---|
| Mirecki 24', 38', 48', 66'; Ciriello 30'; Kleinschmidt 32'; Webster 64' | Report | Budgeon 52' |

State Netball and Hockey Centre

29 September 2013
15:30

| Canberra Lakers (Australian Capital Territory) | 7–2 | (Tasmania) Tassie Tigers |
|---|---|---|
| Kershaw 13'; Sutherland 22', 59'; Baxter 35', 53'; D. Hotchkis 55'; Davidson 66' | Report | Boulton 21'; Edwards 50' |

State Netball and Hockey Centre

29 September 2013
17:30

| VIC Vikings (Victoria (state)) | 4–0 | (Western Australia) WA Thundersticks |
|---|---|---|
| Zull 8'; Ford 61', 68'; Ciriello 65' | Report |

State Netball and Hockey Centre

1 October 2013
15:30

| WA Thundersticks (Western Australia) | 1–2 | (Tasmania) Tassie Tigers |
|---|---|---|
| Park 16' | Report | Middleton 25'; Cock 54' |

State Netball and Hockey Centre

1 October 2013
17:30

| Canberra Lakers (Australian Capital Territory) | 1–2 | (Victoria (state)) VIC Vikings |
|---|---|---|
| Turner 3' | Report | Simpson 45', 55' |

State Netball and Hockey Centre

=== Second round ===
==== Pool C (Medal Round) ====
| Pos | Team | Pld | W | D | L | GF | GA | GD | Pts |
|---|---|---|---|---|---|---|---|---|---|
| 1 | (Queensland) QLD Blades | 3 | 2 | 1 | 0 | 11 | 6 | +5 | 7 |
| 2 | (Victoria (state)) VIC Vikings | 3 | 1 | 1 | 1 | 5 | 8 | −3 | 4 |
| 3 | (New South Wales) NSW Waratahs | 3 | 1 | 0 | 2 | 9 | 7 | +2 | 3 |
| 4 | (Australian Capital Territory) Canberra Lakers | 3 | 1 | 0 | 2 | 4 | 8 | −4 | 3 |

Source: Hockey Australia

2 October 2013
17:30

| NSW Waratahs (New South Wales) | 1–2 | (Australian Capital Territory) Canberra Lakers |
|---|---|---|
| Paterson 52' | Report | M. Hotchkis 45'; Sutherland 65' |

State Netball and Hockey Centre

2 October 2013
19:30

| QLD Blades (Queensland) | 2–2 | (Victoria (state)) VIC Vikings |
|---|---|---|
| Wotherspoon 5'; Hammond 35' | Report | Seccull 17'; Ford 68' |

State Netball and Hockey Centre

4 October 2013
15:30

| QLD Blades (Queensland) | 5–1 | (Australian Capital Territory) Canberra Lakers |
|---|---|---|
| De Young 4'; 24'; Rintala 27'; Whetton 42'; Wilson 46' | Report | Kershaw 30' |

State Netball and Hockey Centre

4 October 2013
17:30

| NSW Waratahs (New South Wales) | 5–1 | (Victoria (state)) VIC Vikings |
|---|---|---|
| Pearce 22', 65'; Paterson 54', 61'; Urquhart 58' | Report | Seccull 52' |

State Netball and Hockey Centre

==== Pool D (Classification Round) ====
| Pos | Team | Pld | W | D | L | GF | GA | GD | Pts |
|---|---|---|---|---|---|---|---|---|---|
| 1 | (Tasmania) Tassie Tigers | 3 | 2 | 1 | 0 | 10 | 5 | +5 | 7 |
| 2 | (Northern Territory) NT Stingers | 3 | 2 | 1 | 0 | 8 | 5 | +3 | 7 |
| 3 | (South Australia) SA Hotshots | 3 | 1 | 0 | 2 | 8 | 13 | −5 | 3 |
| 4 | (Western Australia) WA Thundersticks | 3 | 0 | 0 | 3 | 5 | 8 | −3 | 0 |

Source: Hockey Australia

2 October 2013
13:30

| SA Hotshots (South Australia) | 4–3 | (Western Australia) WA Thundersticks |
|---|---|---|
| Wickham 6', 17'; Joyce 35'; Tamlin 51' | Report | Boyne 40'; Pike 43'; Schubert 48' |

State Netball and Hockey Centre

2 October 2013
15:30

| NT Stingers (Northern Territory) | 2–2 | (Tasmania) Tassie Tigers |
|---|---|---|
| Hullick 12', 57' | Report | Ockenden 44', 55' |

State Netball and Hockey Centre

4 October 2013
11:30

| SA Hotshots (South Australia) | 2–6 | (Tasmania) Tassie Tigers |
|---|---|---|
| Joyce 21'; Gill 67' | Report | McCambridge 13', 54'; Budgeon 17', 28'; Middleton 22'; Mackey 32' |

State Netball and Hockey Centre

4 October 2013
13:30

| NT Stingers (Northern Territory) | 2–1 | (Western Australia) WA Thundersticks |
|---|---|---|
| M. Lockley 22'; Hayward 63' | Report | Pike 24' |

State Netball and Hockey Centre

=== Classification matches ===
==== Seventh and eighth place ====
5 October 2013
10:30

| SA Hotshots (South Australia) | 1–2 | (Western Australia) WA Thundersticks |
|---|---|---|
| Wickham 50' | Report | Boyne 15'; Main 61' |

State Netball and Hockey Centre

==== Fifth and sixth place ====
5 October 2013
12:30

| Tassie Tigers (Tasmania) | 4–3 | (Northern Territory) NT Stingers |
|---|---|---|
| Cock 11', 33'; Boulton 53'; Budgeon 65' | Report | Hayward 21', 61'; Hullick 40' |

State Netball and Hockey Centre

==== Third and fourth place ====
5 October 2013
14:30

| NSW Waratahs (New South Wales) | 9–2 | (Australian Capital Territory) Canberra Lakers |
|---|---|---|
| Paterson 5'; Lobsey 16'; H. Ogilvie 20', 58'; Miller 21', 67'; Orchard 33'; F. Ogilvie 38', 40' | Report | Sutherland 39'; Kershaw 42' |

State Netball and Hockey Centre

==== Final ====
5 October 2013
16:30

| QLD Blades (Queensland) | 3–1 | (Victoria (state)) VIC Vikings |
|---|---|---|
| Dwyer 9'; Wilson 22'; De Young 33' | Report | Ciriello 35' |

State Netball and Hockey Centre

== Awards ==
| Player of the Tournament | Topscorer(s) | Goalkeeper of the Tournament | Play the Whistle |
|---|---|---|---|
| (Tasmania) Eddie Ockenden | (Australian Capital Territory) Troy Sutherland (New South Wales) Mark Paterson | (Australian Capital Territory) Andrew Charter | (South Australia) SA Hotshots |

== Statistics ==
=== Final standings ===
| Pos | Team | Pld | W | D | L | GF | GA | GD | Pts | Final Result |
|---|---|---|---|---|---|---|---|---|---|---|
| 1st place, gold medalist(s) | (Queensland) QLD Blades | 6 | 5 | 1 | 0 | 26 | 9 | +17 | 16 | Gold Medal |
| 2nd place, silver medalist(s) | (Victoria (state)) VIC Vikings | 6 | 3 | 1 | 2 | 17 | 12 | +5 | 10 | Silver Medal |
| 3rd place, bronze medalist(s) | (New South Wales) NSW Waratahs | 6 | 3 | 1 | 2 | 26 | 15 | +11 | 10 | Bronze Medal |
| 4 | (Australian Capital Territory) Canberra Lakers | 6 | 3 | 0 | 3 | 16 | 21 | −5 | 9 | |
| 5 | (Tasmania) Tassie Tigers | 6 | 3 | 1 | 2 | 17 | 22 | −5 | 10 | |
| 6 | (Northern Territory) NT Stingers | 6 | 2 | 1 | 3 | 15 | 17 | −2 | 7 | |
| 7 | (Western Australia) WA Thundersticks | 6 | 1 | 0 | 5 | 9 | 16 | −7 | 3 | |
| 8 | (South Australia) SA Hotshots | 6 | 1 | 1 | 4 | 13 | 27 | −14 | 4 | |

Source: Hockey Australia

=== Goalscorers ===
There were 139 goals scored in 24 matches, for an average of 5.79 goals per match.

5 goals

- (Australian Capital Territory) Troy Sutherland
- (New South Wales) Mark Paterson

4 goals

- (Australian Capital Territory) Aaron Kershaw
- (New South Wales) Joshua Miller
- (Queensland) Jacob Whetton
- (South Australia) Tom Wickham
- (Tasmania) Nicholas Budgeon
- (Victoria (state)) Daniel Mirecki

3 goals

- (New South Wales) Matthew Butturini
- (New South Wales) Duncan Pearce
- (Northern Territory) Jeremy Hayward
- (Northern Territory) Jamie Hullick
- (Queensland) Scott Boyde
- (Queensland) Jamie Dwyer
- (Queensland) Jason Wilson
- (South Australia) Cameron Joyce
- (Tasmania) Geoff Cock
- (Victoria (state)) Chris Ciriello
- (Victoria (state)) Russell Ford
- (Western Australia) Sam Pike

2 goals

- (Australian Capital Territory) Adam Baxter
- (Australian Capital Territory) Glenn Turner
- (New South Wales) Matthew Johnson
- (New South Wales) Thomas Lobsey
- (New South Wales) Flynn Ogilvie
- (New South Wales) Heath Ogilvie
- (Northern Territory) Tyler Crowley
- (Northern Territory) Adrian Lockley
- (Queensland) Liam de Young
- (Queensland) Robert Hammond
- (Queensland) Mark Knowles
- (South Australia) Harrison Gill
- (Tasmania) Angus Boulton
- (Tasmania) Sam McCambridge
- (Tasmania) Dougal Middleton
- (Tasmania) Eddie Ockenden
- (Victoria (state)) Adam Seccull
- (Victoria (state)) Glenn Simpson
- (Western Australia) Craig Boyne

1 goal

- (Australian Capital Territory) Iain Davidson
- (Australian Capital Territory) Daniel Hotchkis
- (Australian Capital Territory) Matthew Hotchkis
- (New South Wales) Simon Orchard
- (New South Wales) Peter Urquhart
- (New South Wales) Tristan White
- (Northern Territory) Will Gilmour
- (Northern Territory) Tarrant Haami-Jones
- (Northern Territory) Mitchell Lockley
- (Northern Territory) Joe Reardon
- (Northern Territory) Cody Tribe
- (Queensland) Daniel Beale
- (Queensland) Justin Douglas
- (Queensland) Kane Posselt
- (Queensland) Aidan Rintala
- (Queensland) Dylan Wotherspoon
- (South Australia) Daniel Cox
- (South Australia) Alistair Oliver
- (South Australia) Jacob Smith
- (South Australia) Glyn Tamlin
- (Tasmania) Jeremy Edwards
- (Tasmania) Kurt Mackey
- (Victoria (state)) Aaron Kleinschmidt
- (Victoria (state)) James Webster
- (Victoria (state)) Gordon Zull
- (Western Australia) Timothy Bates
- (Western Australia) Frank Main
- (Western Australia) Alistair Park
- (Western Australia) Grant Schubert

2 own goals

- (Queensland) QLD Blades (against NT and ACT)

Source: Hockey Australia
