= Hockey at the 2014 Commonwealth Games =

Field hockey at the 2014 Commonwealth Games
- Venue: Glasgow National Hockey Centre
- Dates: 24 July – 3 August 2014
- Competitors: 320 from 10 nations

Hockey at the 2014 Commonwealth Games was the fifth appearance of Hockey at the Commonwealth Games. The field hockey competition was one of ten core sports at the 2014 Commonwealth Games in Glasgow, Scotland. It was the fifth edition since its inclusion in 1998. The competition took place between Thursday 24 July and Sunday 3 August at the purpose-built National Hockey Centre on the city's famous Glasgow Green.

== Preparation ==
The purpose-built National Hockey Centre hosted the 2014 Women's Hockey Champions Challenge I and a men's four nations tournament (involving Argentina, Belgium, England and Scotland) in April 2014 as test events in the lead up to the Commonwealth Games.

== Men's tournament ==
Pool A	Pool B
Scotland; Australia; India; South Africa; Wales	Canada; England; Malaysia; New Zealand; Trinidad and Tobago

== Women's tournament ==
Pool A	Pool B
Canada; India; New Zealand; South Africa; Trinidad and Tobago	Scotland; Australia; England; Malaysia; Wales

== Medal table ==
Rank	Nation	Gold	Silver	Bronze	Total
1	Australia	2	0	0	2
2	England	0	1	1	2
3	India	0	1	0	1
4	New Zealand	0	0	1	1
Totals (4 entries)		2	2	2	6

== Events ==
Event	Gold	Silver	Bronze
Men	Australia; Simon Orchard; Chris Ciriello; Mark Knowles; Eddie Ockenden; Jacob Whetton; Matt Gohdes; Aran Zalewski; Tristan White; Matthew Swann; Daniel Beale; Trent Mitton; Kieran Govers; Kiel Brown; Andrew Philpott; Andrew Charter; Fergus Kavanagh	India; Rupinder Pal Singh; Kothajit Singh; Manpreet Singh; Sardar Singh; Dharamvir Singh; V. R. Raghunath; Gurbaj Singh; Sreejesh Parattu Raveendran; Danish Mujtaba; Gurwinder Singh Chandi; S. V. Sunil; Birendra Lakra; Akashdeep Singh; Chinglensana Kangujam; Ramandeep Singh; Chandanda Nikkin Thimmaiah	England; George Pinner; Iain Lewers; Daniel Fox; Barry Middleton; Henry Weir; Ashley Jackson; Simon Mantell; Harry Martin; Michael Hoare; David Condon; Mark Gleghorne; Phil Roper; Ollie Willars; Adam Dixon; Alastair Brogdon; Nicholas Catlin
Women	Australia; Madonna Blyth; Edwina Bone; Jane Claxton; Casey Eastham; Anna Flanagan; Kate Jenner; Jodie Kenny; Rachael Lynch; Karri McMahon; Georgia Nanscawen; Ashleigh Nelson; Georgie Parker; Brooke Peris; Emily Smith; Jayde Taylor; Kellie White	England; Giselle Ansley; Sophie Bray; Alex Danson; Susie Gilbert; Maddie Hinch; Lily Owsley; Sam Quek; Kate Richardson-Walsh; Zoe Shipperley; Susannah Townsend; Georgie Twigg; Laura Unsworth; Ellie Watton; Hollie Webb; Nicola White; Lucy Wood.	New Zealand; Sam Charlton; Sophie Cocks; Rhiannon Dennison; Gemma Flynn; Krystal Forgesson; Katie Glynn; Jordan Grant; Rose Keddell; Olivia Merry; Stacey Michelsen; Emily Naylor; Anita Punt; Sally Rutherford; Liz Thompson; Petrea Webster; Kayla Whitelock
