= Field hockey at the 2012 Summer Olympics =

Coordinates: 51.5490°N 0.0201°W

Field hockey at the Games of the XXX Olympiad
- Venue: Riverbank Arena
- Dates: 29 July – 11 August 2012
- No. of events: 2
- Competitors: 387 from 15 nations

Field hockey at the 2012 Olympic Games in London took place from 29 July to 11 August at the Riverbank Arena within the Olympic Park.

On 13 November 2010 the International Hockey Federation (FIH) decided to allocate 12 teams for each men and women events respectively.

Germany won the men's tournament for the fourth time, and the women's tournament was won by the Netherlands — their third Olympic women's hockey title.

== Competition schedule ==
P	Preliminaries	½	Semifinals	F	Final

Event↓/Date →	Sun 29	Mon 30	Tue 31	Wed 1	Thu 2	Fri 3	Sat 4	Sun 5	Mon 6	Tue 7	Wed 8	Thu 9	Fri 10	Sat 11
Men		P		P		P		P		P		½		F
Women	P		P		P		P		P		½		F	

== Qualification ==
Each of the continental champions received a berth alongside the host, Great Britain (England, Scotland and Wales compete separately in most competitions, but send a combined team to the Olympics and selected friendly tournaments, which is managed by England Hockey), while another three spots were decided in qualifying tournaments.

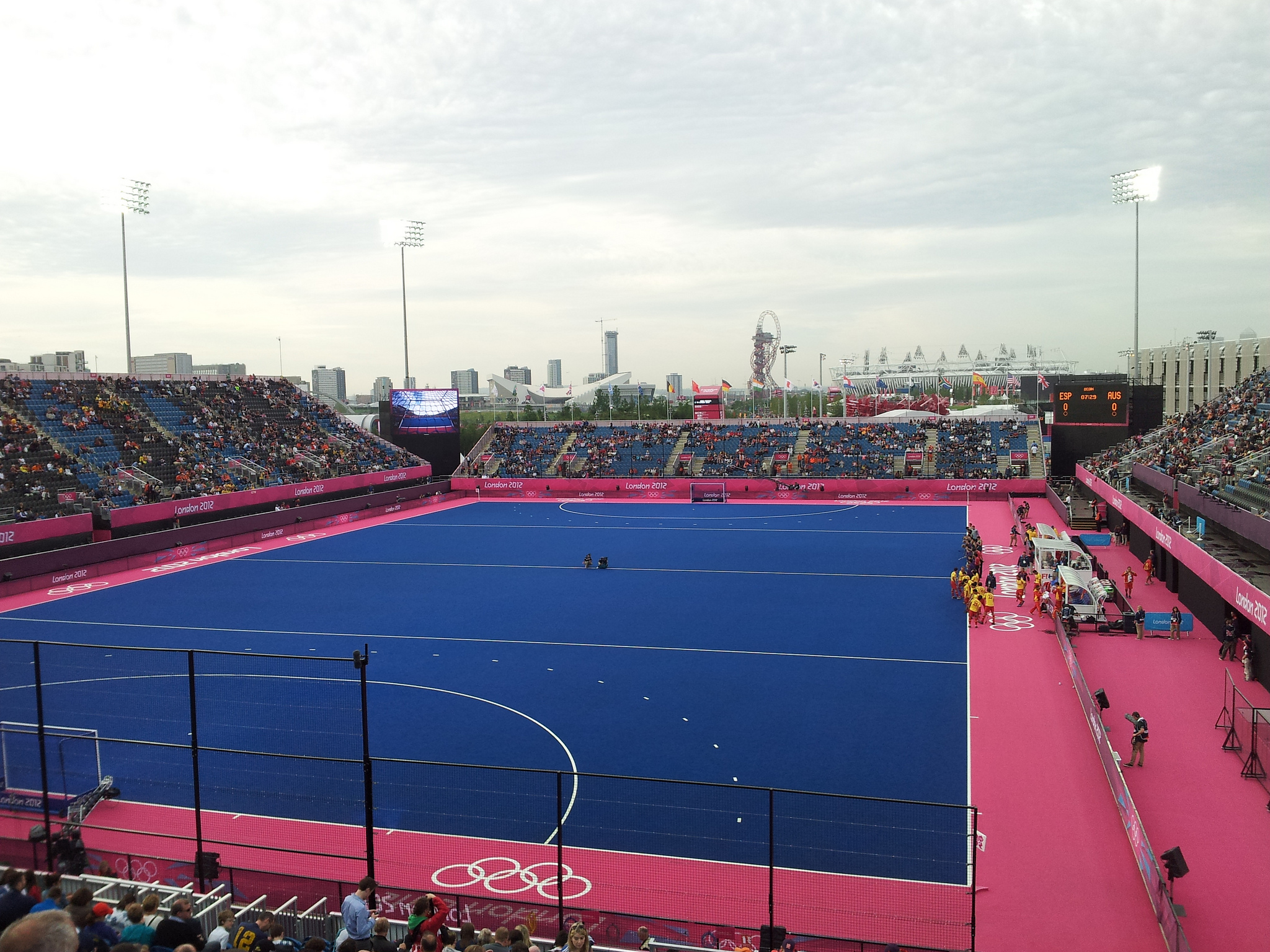
The Riverbank Arena hosted the field hockey tournaments.

For the men's tournament, Europe received two extra quota places, and Oceania one extra. While for the women's, Asia, Oceania and Europe each received one extra quota place. All were based on FIH world rankings.

However, South Africa as African champion for both tournaments gave up the automatic berth on the premise that they should play a qualifier having deemed the African tournament as sub-standard even though they won the African qualifier tournament. Instead they played in the men's and women's Olympic qualification tournament and made the cut. Their automatic berth was awarded to Spain in the men's tournament and Argentina in the women's.

=== Men's qualification ===
Date	Event	Location	Quotas	Qualifier(s)
Host nation			1	Great Britain (4)
15–25 November 2010	2010 Asian Games	Guangzhou, China	1	Pakistan (8)
20–28 August 2011	2011 EuroHockey Championship	Mönchengladbach, Germany	3	Germany (2); Netherlands (3); Belgium^{1} (11)
2–11 September 2011	2011 African Olympic Qualifier	Bulawayo, Zimbabwe	0	—^{2}
6–9 October 2011	2011 Oceania Cup	Hobart, Australia	2	Australia (1); New Zealand (7)
14–30 October 2011	2011 Pan American Games	Guadalajara, Mexico	1	Argentina (9)
18–26 February 2012	Olympic Qualification Tournament 1	New Delhi, India	1	India (10)
10–18 March 2012	Olympic Qualification Tournament 2	Dublin, Ireland	1	South Korea (6)
26 April – 6 May 2012	Olympic Qualification Tournament 3	Kakamigahara, Japan	1	South Africa (12)
Invitational			1	Spain^{2} (5)
Total			12	

^1 – Great Britain automatically qualified as host nation, therefore the berth obtained by England as third placed team at the 2011 EuroHockey Nations Championship was given to fourth placed team Belgium.
^2 – South Africa won the African qualifier tournament but gave up their automatic berth on the premise that they should play a qualifier having deemed the African tournament as sub-standard. Eventually they won the Qualification Tournament 3. Instead, Spain was invited as the highest ranked team not already qualified after the conclusion of the continental championships.

=== Women's qualification ===
Dates	Event	Location	Quotas	Qualifier(s)
Host nation			1	Great Britain (4)
13–24 November 2010	2010 Asian Games	Guangzhou, China	2	China (5); South Korea (8)
20–27 August 2011	2011 EuroHockey Championship	Mönchengladbach, Germany	2	Netherlands (1); Germany (3)
2–11 September 2011	2011 African Olympic Qualifier	Bulawayo, Zimbabwe	0	—^{1}
6–9 October 2011	2011 Oceania Cup	Hobart, Australia	2	New Zealand (6); Australia (7)
14–30 October 2011	2011 Pan American Games	Guadalajara, Mexico	1	United States (10)
18–25 February 2012	Olympic Qualification Tournament 1	New Delhi, India	1	South Africa (12)
17–25 March 2012	Olympic Qualification Tournament 2	Kontich, Belgium	1	Belgium (16)
25 April – 5 May 2012	Olympic Qualification Tournament 3	Kakamigahara, Japan	1	Japan (9)
Invitational			1	Argentina^{1} (2)
Total			12	

^1 – South Africa won the African qualifier tournament but gave up their automatic berth on the premise that they should play a qualifier having deemed the African tournament as sub-standard. Eventually they won the Qualification Tournament 1. Instead, Argentina was invited as the highest ranked team not already qualified after the conclusion of the continental championships.

== Men's tournament ==
=== Pool A ===
Pos	Team	Pld	W	D	L	GF	GA	GD	Pts	Qualification
1	Australia	5	3	2	0	23	5	+18	11	Semi-finals
2	Great Britain (H)	5	2	3	0	14	8	+6	9	Semi-finals
3	Spain	5	2	2	1	8	10	−2	8	Fifth place game
4	Pakistan	5	2	1	2	9	16	−7	7	Seventh place game
5	Argentina	5	1	1	3	10	14	−4	4	Ninth place game
6	South Africa	5	0	1	4	11	22	−11	1	Eleventh place game

Source: FIH
(H) Hosts

=== Pool B ===
Pos	Team	Pld	W	D	L	GF	GA	GD	Pts	Qualification
1	Netherlands	5	5	0	0	18	7	+11	15	Semi-finals
2	Germany	5	3	1	1	14	11	+3	10	Semi-finals
3	Belgium	5	2	1	2	8	7	+1	7	Fifth place game
4	South Korea	5	2	0	3	9	8	+1	6	Seventh place game
5	New Zealand	5	1	2	2	10	14	−4	5	Ninth place game
6	India	5	0	0	5	6	18	−12	0	Eleventh place game

Source: FIH

=== Medal round ===
Semi-finals
9 August
Australia	2
Germany	4
9 August
Netherlands	9
Great Britain	2

Gold medal match
11 August
Germany	2
Netherlands	1
Bronze medal match
11 August
Australia	3
Great Britain	1

=== Final standings ===
1. Germany
2. Netherlands
3. Australia
4. Great Britain
5. Belgium
6. Spain
7. Pakistan
8. South Korea
9. New Zealand
10. Argentina
11. South Africa
12. India

== Women's tournament ==
=== Pool A ===
Pos	Team	Pld	W	D	L	GF	GA	GD	Pts	Qualification
1	Netherlands	5	5	0	0	12	5	+7	15	Semi-finals
2	Great Britain (H)	5	3	0	2	14	7	+7	9	Semi-finals
3	China	5	2	1	2	6	3	+3	7	
4	South Korea	5	2	0	3	9	13	−4	6	
5	Japan	5	1	1	3	4	9	−5	4	
6	Belgium	5	0	2	3	2	10	−8	2	

Source: FIH
Rules for classification: 1) Points; 2) Matches won; 3) Goal difference; 4) Goals for; 5) Head-to-head result.
(H) Hosts

=== Pool B ===
Pos	Team	Pld	W	D	L	GF	GA	GD	Pts	Qualification
1	Argentina	5	3	1	1	12	4	+8	10	Semi-finals
2	New Zealand	5	3	1	1	9	5	+4	10	Semi-finals
3	Australia	5	3	1	1	5	2	+3	10	
4	Germany	5	2	1	2	6	7	−1	7	
5	South Africa	5	1	0	4	9	14	−5	3	
6	United States	5	1	0	4	4	13	−9	3	

Source: FIH
Rules for classification: 1) Points; 2) Matches won; 3) Goal difference; 4) Goals for; 5) Head-to-head result.

=== Medal round ===
Semi-finals
8 August
Netherlands (p.s.o.)	2 (3)
New Zealand	2 (1)
8 August
Argentina	2
Great Britain	1

Gold medal match
10 August
Netherlands	2
Argentina	0
Bronze medal match
10 August
New Zealand	1
Great Britain	3

=== Final standings ===
1. Netherlands
2. Argentina
3. Great Britain
4. New Zealand
5. Australia
6. China
7. Germany
8. South Korea
9. Japan
10. South Africa
11. Belgium
12. United States

== Medal summary ==
=== Medal table ===
* Host nation (Great Britain)

Rank	Nation	Gold	Silver	Bronze	Total
1	Netherlands	1	1	0	2
2	Germany	1	0	0	1
3	Argentina	0	1	0	1
4	Australia	0	0	1	1
4	Great Britain*	0	0	1	1
Totals (5 entries)		2	2	2	6

=== Medalists ===
Event	Gold	Silver	Bronze
Men's team	Germany; Maximilian Müller; Martin Häner; Oskar Deecke; Christopher Wesley; Moritz Fürste; Tobias Hauke; Jan-Philipp Rabente; Benjamin Weß; Timo Weß; Oliver Korn; Christopher Zeller; Max Weinhold; Matthias Witthaus; Florian Fuchs; Philipp Zeller; Thilo Stralkowski	Netherlands; Jaap Stockmann; Klaas Vermeulen; Marcel Balkestein; Wouter Jolie; Roderick Weusthof; Robbert Kempermann; Teun de Nooijer; Sander Baart; Floris Evers; Bob de Voogd; Sander de Wijn; Rogier Hofman; Robert van der Horst; Billy Bakker; Valentin Verga; Mink van der Weerden	Australia; Mark Knowles; Jamie Dwyer; Liam de Young; Simon Orchard; Glenn Turner; Chris Ciriello; Matthew Butturini; Russell Ford; Eddie Ockenden; Joel Carroll; Matthew Gohdes; Tim Deavin; Matthew Swann; Nathan Burgers; Kieran Govers; Fergus Kavanagh
Women's team	Netherlands; Marilyn Agliotti; Merel de Blaeij; Eva de Goede; Maartje Goderie; Ellen Hoog; Kelly Jonker; Kim Lammers; Maartje Paumen; Sophie Polkamp; Joyce Sombroek; Naomi van As; Carlien Dirkse van den Heuvel; Margot van Geffen; Kitty van Male; Caia van Maasakker; Lidewij Welten	Argentina; Luciana Aymar; Noel Barrionuevo; Martina Cavallero; Laura del Colle; Silvina D'Elía; Florencia Habif; Rosario Luchetti; Sofía Maccari; Delfina Merino; Maria Florencia Mutio; Carla Rebecchi; Macarena Rodríguez; Rocío Sánchez Moccia; Mariela Scarone; Daniela Sruoga; Maria Josefina Sruoga	Great Britain; Ashleigh Ball; Laura Bartlett; Crista Cullen; Alex Danson; Hannah Macleod; Emily Maguire; Anne Panter; Helen Richardson; Chloe Rogers; Beth Storry; Sarah Thomas; Georgie Twigg; Laura Unsworth; Kate Walsh; Sally Walton; Nicola White
