= Andrew Cornick =

Welsh field hockey player (born 1981)

Personal information
- Born: 9 June 1981 (age 45) Southampton, England

Sport
- Sport: Field hockey
- Position: Forward
Senior career
Years	Team	Caps	Goals
1999, 2014	Trojans	-	-
2001	Havant	-	-
2007–2008	Hampstead & Westminster	-	-
2008–2013	Surbiton	-	-
2014	Oxted	-	-
2020–2022	Old Georgians	-	-
National team
Years	Team	Caps	Goals
–	Wales		-

Andrew Cornick (born 9 June 1981) is a Welsh field hockey player.

== Biography ==
Cornick played club hockey in the Men's England Hockey League for Hampstead & Westminster and then Surbiton.

Cornick, while playing for Oxted, represented Wales in the 2014 Commonwealth Games in Glasgow.
