= Richard Gay (field hockey) =

Welsh field hockey player

Rick Gay
Personal information
- Born: 27 October 1983 (age 42) Johannesburg, South Africa

Sport
- Sport: Field hockey
- Position: Defender
Senior career
Years	Team	Caps	Goals
2012–2014	Southgate	-	-
2009–2017	East Grinstead	-	-
National team
Years	Team	Caps	Goals
–	Wales		-

Richard Gay (born 27 October 1983) is a former field hockey player from Wales.

== Biography ==
Gay represented South Africa before switching affiliation to Wales in 2008.

He represented Wales in the 2014 Commonwealth Games in Glasgow.

He has played club hockey for Southgate and East Grinstead.
