= Nathan Burgers =

Australian field hockey player (born 1979)

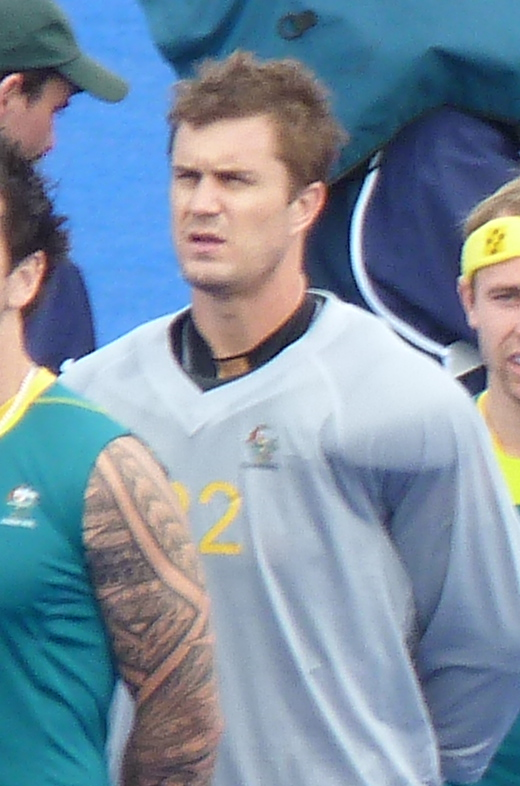
- Nathan Burgers' in 2012 Olympic field hockey team, Australia

Personal information
- Nationality: Australian
- Born: May 1979 (age 47) Ayr, Queensland, Australia

Sport
- Country: Australia
- Sport: Field hockey
- Event: Men's team
Medal record
Men's field hockey
Representing Australia
Olympic Games
Bronze medal – third place	2012 London	Team
Champions Trophy
Gold medal – first place	2010 Mönchengladbach	Team
Hockey at the Commonwealth Games
Gold medal – first place	2010 Delhi	Team

Nathan Burgers (born May 1979 in Ayr, Queensland) is an Australian professional field hockey goalkeeper. He played for Queensland and the Australian Capital Territory teams in national competitions. He has been a member of the Australia men's national field hockey team. As a member of the team, he won a gold medal at the 2010 Men's Hockey Champions Trophy and the 2010 Commonwealth Games. He was also a member of the team that won the bronze medal at the 2012 Summer Olympics in London, United Kingdom.

== Personal ==
Burgers was born in May 1979 in Ayr, Queensland. He resided in Perth, Western Australia. He worked as a sports teacher at East Maddington Primary School. After the London 2012 Olympics he will stay in Amsterdam with his family.

== Field hockey ==
Burgers is a goalkeeper. He has held a hockey scholarship with the ACT Academy of Sport and the Australian Institute of Sport. He went on a tour of Asia in 2006 with the Australian Institute of Sport team.

In 2000, Burgers played for the North Queensland Barras in the Australian Hockey League but left the team after they were removed from the competition at the end of the year. At the end of the 2001 season, he also seriously injured his wrist and there were fears this could permanently prevent him from playing the game against competitively. In 2006, 2007 and 2008, he played for the Australian Capital Territory team, the Canberra Lakers, as a member of the state team and for the Australian Hockey League competition. Prior to the start of a 2007 game against the NSW Darters where he was support to be in goal, he injured his quad while warming up for the game. In 2010, he played in the final game of the season for his state team in the Australian Hockey League.

=== National team ===
In December 2007, Burgers was a member of the Kookaburras squad that competed in the Dutch Series in Canberra. In January 2008, he was a member of the senior national team that competed at the Five Nations men's hockey tournament in South Africa. New national team coach Ric Charlesworth named him, a returning member, and fourteen total new players who had never appeared on the squad before in April 2009 in a bid to ready the team for the 2010 Commonwealth Games. In 2009, he was a member of the national team during a five-game test series in Kuala Lumpur, Malaysia against Malaysia. He was with the national team in 2010. when they finished first at the Hockey Champions Trophy. He won a gold medal at the 2010 World Cup in Delhi, India. In 2010, he also represented Australia at the Commonwealth Games. He beat out Ross Meadows and George Bazeley to start in goal during the opening round against Scotland at the Commonwealth Games. He played in the game against Pakistan during the group stage. In December 2011, he was named as one of twenty-eight players to be on the 2012 Summer Olympics Australian men's national training squad. This squad will be narrowed in June 2012. He trained with the team from 18 January to mid-March in Perth, Western Australia. In February during the training camp, he played in a four nations test series with the teams being the Kookaburras, Australia A Squad, the Netherlands and Argentina. He is one of several Queensland based players likely to play in a three-game test series to be played in Cairns, Queensland from 22 to 25 June against the New Zealand Black Sticks. Final Olympic section will occur several days before this test and his inclusion in the series will be contingent upon being selected.
