= Andrew Charter =

Australian field hockey player (born 1987)

Personal information
- Full name: Andrew Lewis Charter
- Born: 30 March 1987 (age 39) Canberra, Australian Capital Territory
- Height: 1.82 m (6 ft 0 in)
- Weight: 87 kg (192 lb)

Sport
- Sport: Field hockey
- Position: Goalkeeper
National team
Years	Team	Caps	Goals
2011–	Australia	185	(0)
Medal record
Men's field hockey
Representing Australia
Olympic Games
Silver medal – second place	2020 Tokyo	Team
World Cup
Gold medal – first place	2014 The Hague
Bronze medal – third place	2018 Bhubaneswar
Oceania Cup
Gold medal – first place	2011 Hobart
Gold medal – first place	2013 Stratford
Gold medal – first place	2019 Rockhampton
FIH Pro League
Gold medal – first place	2019 Amstelveen
Champions Trophy
Gold medal – first place	2011 Auckland
Gold medal – first place	2012 Melbourne
Gold medal – first place	2016 London
Bronze medal – third place	2014 Bhubaneswar
World League
Gold medal – first place	2014–15 Raipur	Team
Commonwealth Games
Gold medal – first place	2014 Glasgow	Team
Gold medal – first place	2018 Gold Coast	Team
Gold medal – first place	2022 Birmingham	Team
- Updated on 8 August 2022

Andrew Lewis Charter (born 30 March 1987) is an Australian field hockey player. He played club hockey for Central Hockey Club, winning a championship with the team in 2004 and 2008. He played for the Australian Capital Territory team in the Australian Hockey League. He is a member of the Australia men's national field hockey team.

== Personal ==
Charter is from the Australian Capital Territory. In 2010, he moved from Canberra to Perth in order to train at the Australian Institute of Sport hockey academy.

== Field hockey ==
Charter is a goalkeeper. In 2005, he represented the Australian Capital Territory in the national U21 Championships. In 2006, he was a member of Australian U21 men's hockey team. He was supposed to make his international debut for the team in a game against Korea but lost the opportunity after he broke a toe while playing football.

Charter used to play club hockey with the Central Hockey Club. He was playing with the club in 2006. His club had a three-week losing streak going into the senior men's ACT grand final. In the final, Charter was in goal and made several important key saves on goal during the game which allowed his side to win the game 3–0. He switched club sides to compete for one in Fremantle in 2010 after moving to the west coast. Charter currently plays hockey with Melville hockey club when he's not on state or national duty. In 2007, 2008, 2010 and 2011, Charter played for the Australian Capital Territory team, the Canberra Lakers. in the Australian Hockey League. In 2007, he was a replacement goalkeeper in a game against New South Wales Arrows after Nathan Burgers injured himself while warming up for the game. He allowed two goals while his team scored two. The game ended in a 4–3 victory for his team after the game went to penalty shots. This was the first time in seven games where his team won when a game went to penalty shots.

=== National team ===
Charter is a member of the Australia men's national field hockey team. In 2011, he was a member of the national team that competed at the Azlan Shah Cup in Malaysia. This was the first time he had been called up to play for the national team. In July 2011, he traveled but not compete with the team when they toured Europe. He won a gold medal at the Champion Trophy tournament in 2011. In December 2011, he was named as one of twenty-eight players to be on the 2012 Summer Olympics Australian men's national training squad. This squad will be narrowed in June 2012. He trained with the team from 18 January to mid-March in Perth. In February during the training camp, he played in a four nations test series with the teams being the Kookaburras, Australia A Squad, the Netherlands and Argentina.

Charter was selected in the Kookaburras Olympics squad for the Tokyo 2020 Olympics. The team reached the final for the first time since 2004 but couldn't achieve gold, beaten by Belgium in a shootout.
