= Kieran Govers =

Australian field hockey player (born 1988)

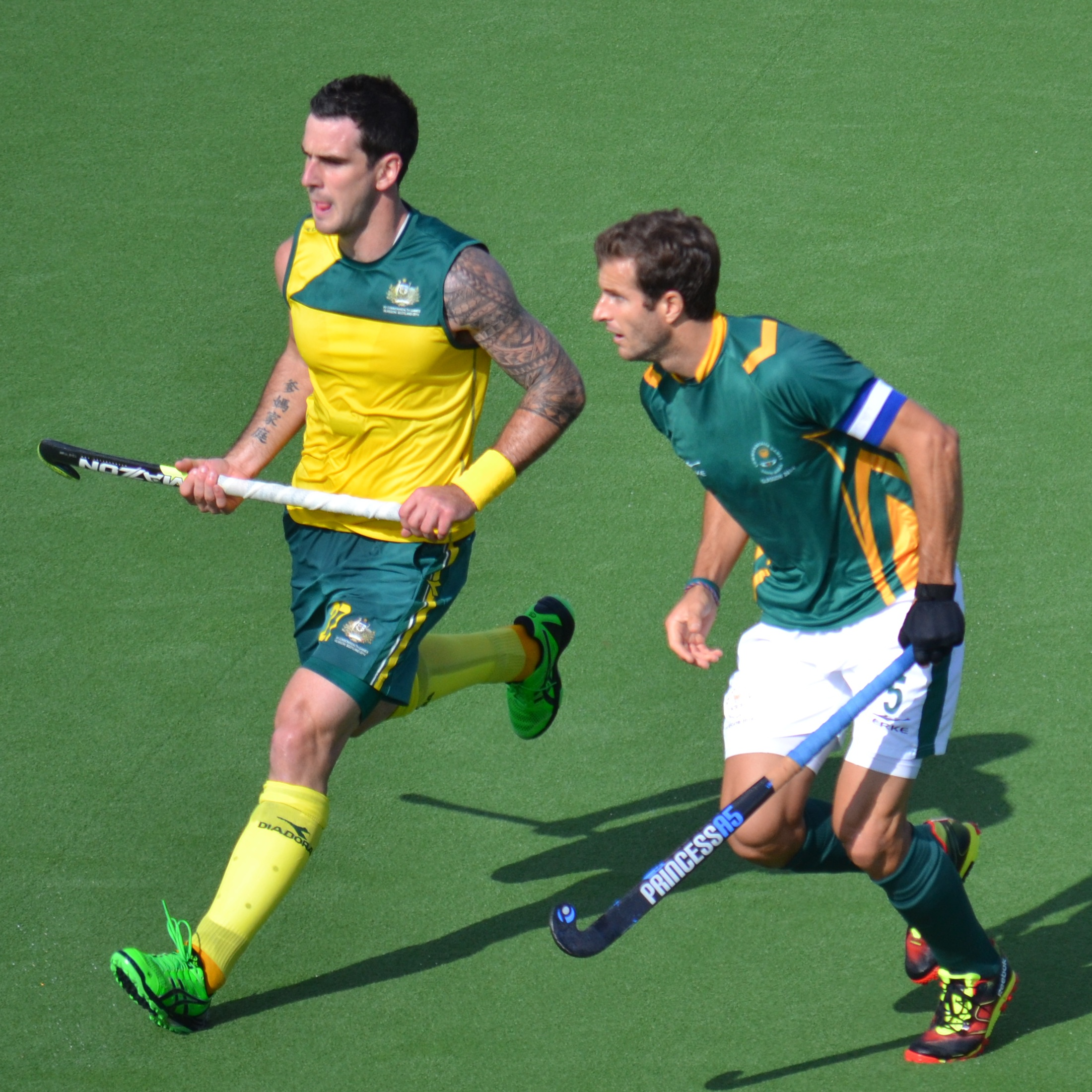
- Govers (left) at the 2014 Commonwealth Games

Personal information
- Born: 9 February 1988 (age 38) Wollongong, New South Wales
- Height: 179 cm (5 ft 10 in)
- Weight: 78 kg (172 lb)

Sport
- Sport: Field hockey
- Club: Monarch Padma(2022)
Medal record
Men's field hockey
Representing Australia
Olympic Games
Bronze medal – third place	2012 London	Team
World Cup
Gold medal – first place	2010 New Delhi	Team
Gold medal – first place	2014 The Hague	Team
Champions Trophy
Gold medal – first place	2010 Mönchengladbach	Team
Gold medal – first place	2012 Melbourne	Team
Commonwealth Games
Gold medal – first place	2014 Glasgow	Team

Kieran Govers (born 9 February 1988) is an Australian field hockey player. He plays field hockey professionally in Germany. He plays for the NSW Waratahs in the Australian Hockey League. He first represented Australia in 2010. He won a gold medal at the 2010 Men's Hockey World Cup, at the 2010 Men's Hockey Champions Trophy and the 2014 Commonwealth Games. He won a bronze medal at the 2012 Summer Olympics. Govers currently serves as the Chairperson of Illawarra South Coast Hockey Inc.

== Personal ==
Govers is from New South Wales. His younger brother is international hockey player Blake Govers.

== Field hockey ==
Govers played junior hockey in Albion Park, New South Wales. He plays hockey professionally. In 2011, he played club hockey for Mannheim in Germany. In Australia, he plays local club hockey for Sutherland District Hockey club. He played hockey for the Illawarra club in 2011.

=== State team ===
He plays for the NSW Waratahs in the Australian Hockey League. He played for the team in the first found of the 2011 season.

=== National team ===
Govers first made the national team in 2010. He made his full international appearance in the Hobart-based three-Test series against South Korea. He won a gold medal at the 2010 World Cup, playing in every single game of the campaign. He was left off the roster for the 2010 Commonwealth Games, because Australia has a rotational policy for team inclusion. He was a member of the 2010 Australian gold winning side that competed at the Champions Trophy and competed in the first three games of the Champions Trophy. He did not play final game despite making an effort to get selected for it by the national team coach. His laryngitis was one of the reasons that he did not play in the game so he watched the game from the sidelines.

In 2011, he represented Australia in almost every tournament the country participated in. He was not a member of the 2011 Champions Cup squad because he had a groin injury. He did not compete at the Azlan Shah Cup in Malaysia in May 2011 because he was injured. In December 2011, he was named as one of twenty-eight players to be on the 2012 Summer Olympics Australian men's national training squad. This squad was narrowed in June 2012. He trained with the team from 18 January to mid-March in Perth, Western Australia. In February during the training camp, he played in a four nations test series with the teams being the Kookaburras, Australia A Squad, the Netherlands and Argentina. In a game for the Kookaburras against Argentina, his team won 4-0 and he scored a goal.

He was part of the Australian team that won the 2014 Commonwealth Games.
