= Nathan E. Edwards =

American politician

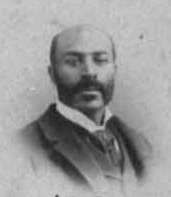
Nathan E. Edwards (1855 - 1908)

Nathan E. Edwards (1855 - 1908) was a state legislator in Arkansas. He represented Chicot County as a Republican for the 1893 session. He was one of at least four African Americans in the Arkansas House of Representatives in 1893 along with George W. Bell in the state senate. He and other Arkansas legislators were photographed in 1893.

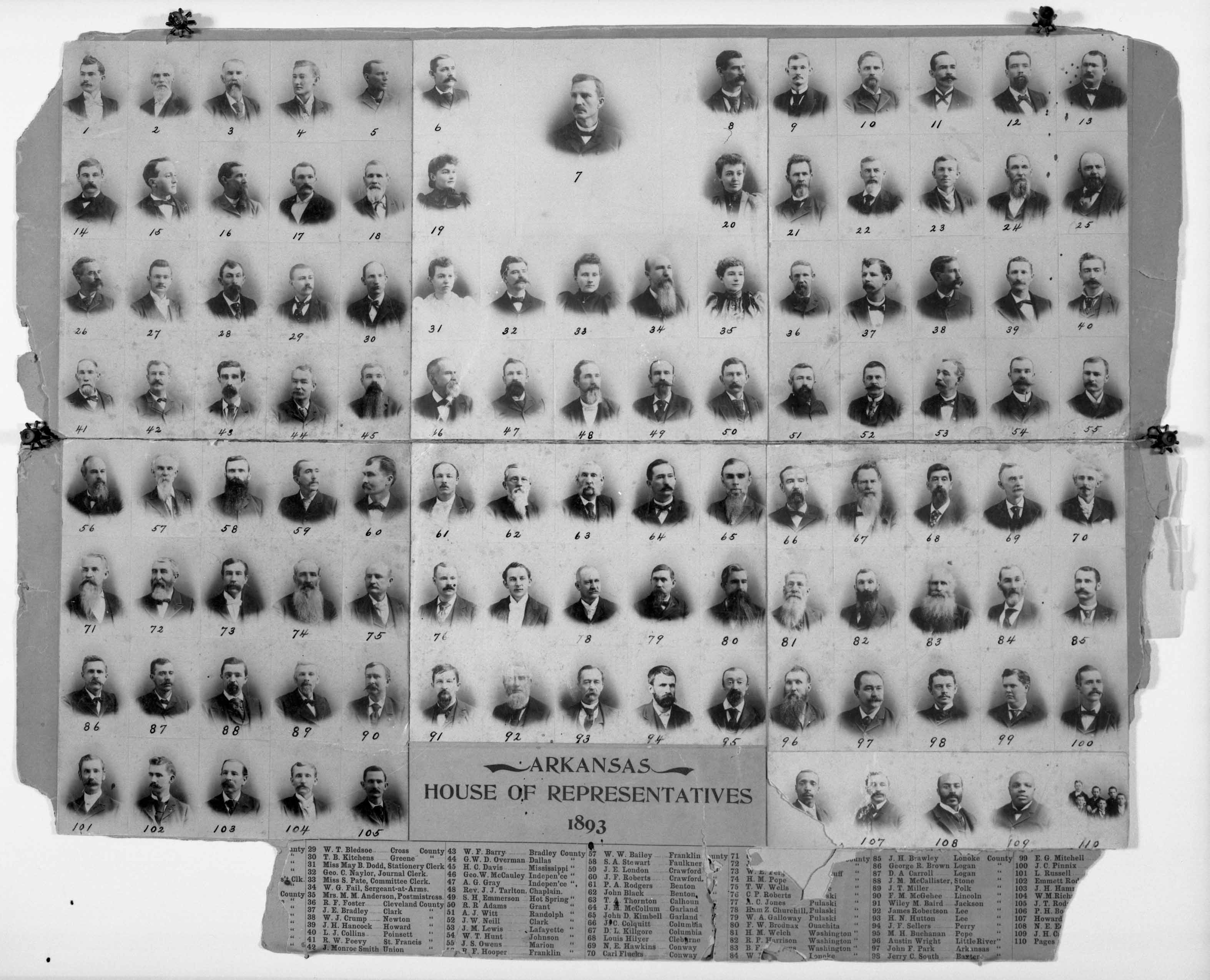
Members of the 1893 Arkansas House of Representatives (numbers 106 to 109 are the African Americans)

He worked as a farmer, farm laborer, and minister before and after his legislative service. He was a pastor in Eudora a First Baptist Church. He died 1908.

== See also ==
- African American officeholders from the end of the Civil War until before 1900
