= Matthew Butturini =

Australian field hockey player (born 1987)

Personal information
- Nationality: Australian
- Born: 7 August 1987 (age 39) Murwillumbah, New South Wales

Sport
- Country: Australia
- Sport: Field hockey
- Event: Men's team
Medal record
Men's field hockey
Representing Australia
Olympic Games
Bronze medal – third place	2012 London	Team
World Cup
Gold medal – first place	2010 New Delhi	Team
Champions Trophy
Gold medal – first place	2009 Melbourne	Team
Gold medal – first place	2011 Auckland	Team

Matthew Butturini (born 7 August 1987 in Murwillumbah) is an Australian field hockey player. He is a member of the Australia men's national field hockey team. He won a gold medal at the 2010 Men's Hockey World Cup and a gold medal at the 2011 Men's Hockey Champions Trophy. He was part of the bronze medal-winning Australian team at the 2012 Summer Olympics.

== Personal ==
Butturini was born in August 1987 in Murwillumbah, New South Wales. In 2009, he was a university student, studying in New South Wales. That year, he completed a Bachelor of Science degree at Sydney University. After graduating, he moved to Perth so he could train with the national team full-time.

== Field hockey ==
Butturini is a centre and defender. He participated in a national development camp in December 2008 in Perth, Western Australia. At the camp, he attracted the attention of national team coach Ric Charlesworth who would be key in moving him to the national team. Charlesworth describes him as a "fast learner who offers both speed and versatility".

=== State team ===
Butturini plays for the NSW Waratahs in the Australian Hockey League. He played for the team in the first found of the 2011 season.

=== National team ===
Butturini is a member of the Australian national team. New national team coach Ric Charlesworth named him and thirteen new players who had less than ten national team caps to the squad before in April 2009 in a bid to ready the team for the 2010 Commonwealth Games. In 2009, he was a member of the national team during a five-game test series in Kuala Lumpur, Malaysia against Malaysia. In 2009, he won a gold medal at the Men's Hockey Champions Trophy competition. He played in the game against Korea. He won a gold medal at the 2010 World Cup in Delhi, India. In May 2011, he played in the Azlan Shah Cup for Australia. The Cup featured teams from Pakistan, Malaysia, India, South Korea, Britain and New Zealand. He won a gold medal in the 2011 Champions Trophy in New Zealand, playing in all the pool and semi-final games for Australia. In December 2011, he was named as one of twenty-eight players to be on the 2012 Summer Olympics Australian men's national training squad. This squad will be narrowed in June 2012. He trained with the team from 18 January to mid-March in Perth, Western Australia. In February during the training camp, he played in a four nations test series with the teams being the Kookaburras, Australia A Squad, the Netherlands and Argentina.

=== Coaching ===
Butturini coached the Southern River Hockey Club, and was coaching the team in 2011 and 2012. In 2011, he guided his team to a premiership. He then went on to player-coach the Fremantle Hockey Club in the Premier 1 grade in WA until 2019.
