= Liam de Young =

Australian field hockey player

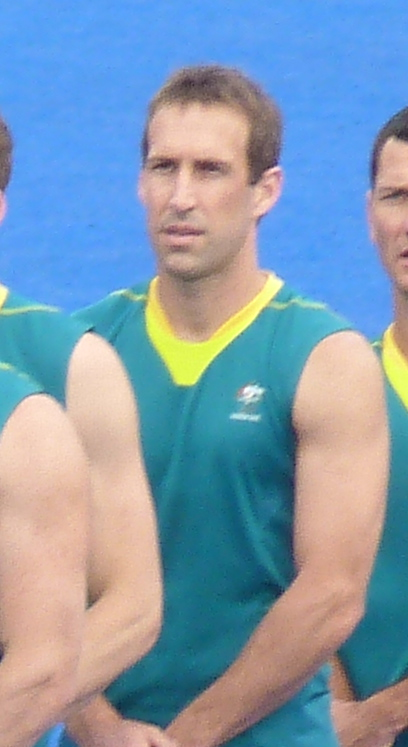
- 2012 Olympic field hockey team Australia

Personal information
- Nationality: Australian

Sport
- Country: Australia
- Sport: Field hockey
- Event: Men's team
Medal record
Men's field hockey
Representing Australia
Olympic Games
Gold medal – first place	2004 Athens	Team
Bronze medal – third place	2008 Beijing	Team
Bronze medal – third place	2012 London	Team
World Cup
Gold medal – first place	2014 The Hague	Team
Champions Trophy
Gold medal – first place	2005 Chennai	Team
Gold medal – first place	2010 Mönchengladbach	Team
Gold medal – first place	2011 Auckland	Team
Commonwealth Games
Gold medal – first place	2002 Manchester	Team
Gold medal – first place	2006 Melbourne	Team
Gold medal – first place	2010 New Delhi	Team

Liam de Young (born 10 December 1981) is an Australian field hockey player and played club hockey for St. Andrew's. He is a member of Australia men's national field hockey team, winning a gold medal with the team at the 2002 Commonwealth Games, a gold medal at the 2004 Summer Olympics, a bronze medal at the 2008 Summer Olympics and another bronze medal at the 2012 Summer Olympics.

== Personal ==
Liam de Young is from Bray Park, Queensland. He attended Pine Rivers State High School. He moved to Perth, Western Australia in order to be more available to the national team.

== Field hockey ==
Liam is a midfielder. In 2002, he played for the St. Andrew's club after not having played for the club in two years. He was the first player from St Andrew's to make Australia's senior national team. In 2010, he played in the final game of the season for his state team in the Australian Hockey League.

=== National team ===
He made his senior national team debut in 2001.

He won a gold medal at the 2002 Commonwealth Games in Manchester, England.

He won a gold medal at the 2004 Summer Olympics, Australia's first ever gold medal in men's field hockey at the Olympics. His mother, father and two brothers were in Athens to watch him win the gold medal. In recognition of this, de Young was awarded the Medal of the Order of Australia (OAM) in the 2005 Australia Day Honours.

In 2006, he represented Australia at the Azlan Shah tournament in Malaysia. He competed in the 2007 Champions Trophy competition for Australia.

He won a bronze medal at the 2008 Summer Olympics, playing in every match at the Games for Australia.

New national team coach Ric Charlesworth named him, a returning member, and fourteen total new players who had few than 10 national team caps to the squad before in April 2009 in a bid to ready the team for the 2010 Commonwealth Games. In 2009, he was a member of the national team during a five-game test series in Kuala Lumpur, Malaysia against Malaysia. He was a member of the national team in 2010. That year, he was a member of the team that finished first at the Hockey Champions Trophy. In May 2011, he played in the Azlan Shah Cup for Australia. The Cup featured teams from Pakistan, Malaysia, India, South Korea, Britain and New Zealand. In December 2011, he was named as one of twenty-eight players to be on the 2012 Summer Olympics Australian men's national training squad. This squad was narrowed in June 2012. He trained with the team from 18 January to mid-March in Perth, Western Australia. In February during the training camp, he played in a four nations test series with the teams being the Kookaburras, Australia A Squad, the Netherlands and Argentina. He played for the Australian A team in their 3–1 loss to the Kookaburras in the first round of the competition. He scored his team's only goal. He was selected to play for Australia at the 2012 Summer Olympics, where they won the bronze medal.

He was also part of the Australian team that won the 2014 World Cup. At the 2014 Sultan Azlan Shah Cup, de Young became just the fourth man to make 300 national team appearances for Australia (the other three being Jay Stacy, Brent Livermore and Jamie Dwyer).
