= Aaron Kershaw =

Australian field hockey player (born 1992)

Personal information
- Born: 22 October 1992 (age 34) Goulburn, New South Wales

Sport
- Sport: Field hockey
- Position: Defender
- Club: Goulburn Hockey Club
Senior career
| Years | Team | Caps | Goals |
| 2011–2018 | Canberra Lakers | 58 | 13 |
| 2019– | Canberra Chill | 2 | 1 |
National team
| Years | Team | Caps | Goals |
| 2013 | Australia U–21 | 20 | (2) |
Medal record
Men's field hockey
Representing Australia U–21
Australian Youth Olympic Festival
| Gold medal – first place | 2013 Sydney | Team |

Aaron Kershaw (born 22 October 1992) is a field hockey player from Australia.

== Personal life ==
Aaron Kershaw was born and raised in Goulburn, New South Wales.

His pre-game pump-up song is The Horses by Daryl Braithwaite.

== Career ==
=== Club level ===
In Hockey ACT's 'National League One', Kershaw plays hockey for Goulburn Hockey Club.

Over a period of three years, from 2015 to 2017, Kershaw was awarded the 'Brophy Medal' back to back. The award is presented to the best and fairest of the competition.

=== State level ===
Despite coming from New South Wales, Kershaw represents the Australian Capital Territory in domestic competitions.

Kershaw first represented the Canberra Lakers, the ACT's top men's side, at the Australian Hockey League (AHL) in 2011. Since his debut, Kershaw represented the team every year until 2018, when the AHL was disbanded.

In 2019, with the introduction of Hockey Australia's new national league, Hockey One, Kershaw was named captain of the ACT's new team, the Canberra Chill.

=== National level ===
Aaron Kershaw has only represented Australia at junior level, in the Under–21 division.

Kershaw made his debut for the 'Burras' in 2013, at the Australian Youth Olympic Festival where he won a gold medal. He followed this up with an appearance at the Junior World Cup, where Australia finished fifth.
