= Graeme Begbie =

Australian field hockey player

Personal information
- Nickname: Grey
- Nationality: Australian
- Born: January 1986 (age 40) Perth, Western Australia

Sport
- Country: Australia
- Sport: Field hockey
- Event: Men's team
- Club: YMCC Coastal City Hockey Club
- Team: WA Thundersticks
- Now coaching: YMCC Coastal City Hockey Club Juniors (2008–???)
Medal record
Men's field hockey
Representing Australia
World Cup
Gold medal – first place	2010 New Delhi	Team

Graeme Begbie (born January 1986 in Perth) is an Australian field hockey player. He plays club hockey for YMCC Coastal City Hockey Club. In state competitions, he plays for the WA Thundersticks in the Australian Hockey League. In 2010 he was part of the Kookaburras World Cup winning team in Delhi, India and in the same year was named joint Kookaburra of the Year alongside Jamie Dwyer. In December 2011, he was named as one of twenty-eight players to be on the Kookaburras 2012 Olympics squad. This squad will be narrowed in June 2012 to determine who will compete at the 2012 Summer Olympics.

== Personal ==
Begbie was born in January 1986 in Perth, Western Australia. He worked for SGS Australia Pty. Ltd. in Perth, Western Australia in 2010 where he was an occupational health and safety officer.

== Field hockey ==
In 2009, Begbie had a field hockey scholarship with the Western Australian Institute of Sport. In 2010, he was practising from 5:30 to 8:30 am four times a week while playing club hockey, state representative hockey and playing for the national team.

=== Club hockey ===
Begbie plays club hockey for YMCC Coastal City Hockey Club. He was a member of the team that won 5 premierships in 7 years in 2009, 2011, 2013, 2014, 2015. In 2008, his team won the league's minor premiership. In 2007, he played in the 22nd round of the Men's Wizard Home Loans Cup against Wesley South Perth where his team won 6–2, where he scored his team's second goal. He has coached junior sides at the club, including an under 11 side in 2008.

=== State team ===
Begbie plays for the WA Thundersticks in the Australian Hockey League. He was with the team in 2009 and 2010.

=== National team ===
Begbie is a member of Australia's senior men's national field hockey team. In March 2009, he got a call up to the national team after participating in a training camp with the team earlier in the year in Brisbane. In 2009, he was a member of the national team during a five-game test series in Kuala Lumpur, Malaysia against Malaysia. In 2010, he won a gold medal at the World Cup. That year, he was also named the Kookaburra of the year. As of July 2010, he had made 38 caps for the Kookaburras. He did not compete at the Azlan Shah Cup in Malaysia in May 2011 because he was injured. In December 2011, he was named as one of twenty-eight players to be on the 2012 Summer Olympics Australian men's national training squad. This squad will be narrowed in June 2012. He trained with the team from 18 January to mid-March in Perth, Western Australia. In February during the training camp, he played in a four nations test series with the teams being the Kookaburras, Australia A Squad, the Netherlands and Argentina.
