= Hockey at the 2014 Commonwealth Games – Men's tournament =

2014 Commonwealth Games–Men's hockey
Tournament details
- Host country: Scotland
- City: Glasgow
- Dates: 25 July – 3 August 2014
- Teams: 10
- Venue: Glasgow National Hockey Centre

Final positions
- Champions: Australia (5th title)
- Runner-up: India
- Third place: England

Tournament statistics
- Matches played: 27
- Goals scored: 148 (5.48 per match)
- Top scorer(s): (Australia) Chris Ciriello (England) Ashley Jackson (9 goals)

The men's field hockey event at the 2014 Commonwealth Games was held at the Glasgow National Hockey Centre from 25 July to 3 August 2014. Australia defeated India in the final to take their fifth consecutive gold medal at the Commonwealth Games, whilst England defeated New Zealand on penalties in the bronze medal match.

== Competition format ==
Two groups each of five teams were drawn. Pool A consisted of Scotland, Australia, India, South Africa and Wales; whilst pool B consisted of Canada, England, Malaysia, New Zealand and Trinidad and Tobago. The teams were required to play each other team in their group once in a group stage format. Three points were awarded for a win and one for a draw, with goal difference being necessary should the teams be tied on the same number of points.

The top two teams from each group qualified for the semifinals (the winner of group A playing the runner-up of group B and vice versa) whilst the teams which did not qualify played the team which achieved their position in the other group (i.e. 3rd place group A played 3rd place group B, 4th place group A played 4th place group B and 5th place group A played 5th place group B) to determine the fifth through to tenth-place rankings.

The winners of the semifinals qualified for the gold medal match whilst the losers played in the bronze medal match. England defeated New Zealand 4–2 on penalties after a 3–3 tie after normal time to take the bronze medal, whilst in the final Australia defeated India 4-0 after normal time to take their fifth consecutive men's hockey gold medal at the Commonwealth Games.

== Results ==
=== Preliminary round ===
==== Pool A ====
| Pos | Team | Pld | W | D | L | GF | GA | GD | Pts | Qualification |
|---|---|---|---|---|---|---|---|---|---|---|
| 1 | Australia | 4 | 4 | 0 | 0 | 22 | 3 | +19 | 12 | Semi-finals |
| 2 | India | 4 | 3 | 0 | 1 | 16 | 9 | +7 | 9 | Semi-finals |
| 3 | South Africa | 4 | 2 | 0 | 2 | 9 | 12 | −3 | 6 | |
| 4 | Scotland | 4 | 1 | 0 | 3 | 6 | 16 | −10 | 3 | |
| 5 | Wales | 4 | 0 | 0 | 4 | 6 | 19 | −13 | 0 | |

Source: FIH
Rules for classification: 1) points; 2) goal difference; 3) goals scored; 4) head-to-head result.

25 July 2014
09:00

| India | 3–1 | Wales |
|---|---|---|
| Raghunath 20'; R. Singh 42'; Chandi 47' | Report | Cornick 23' |

Umpires:
Peter Wright (RSA)
Lim Hong Zhen (SIN)

25 July 2014
11:00

| South Africa | 2–0 | Scotland |
|---|---|---|
| Cronje 41'; Malgraff 66' | Report |

Umpires:
Haider Rasool (PAK)
Adam Kearns (AUS)

26 July 2014
14:00

| Australia | 7–1 | Wales |
|---|---|---|
| Ciriello 6'; Govers 7'; Whetton 29', 44', 46'; Gohdes 66', 69' | Report | Kyriakides 50' |

Umpires:
Martin Madden (SCO)
Gavin Caldecott (CAN)

26 July 2014
16:00

| India | 6–2 | Scotland |
|---|---|---|
| G. Singh 6'; Raghunath 23', 45'; R. Singh 37', 48'; Chandi 40' | Report | Bain 56'; Parkes 69' |

Umpires:
Gareth Greenfield (NZL)
Eric Koh (MAS)

28 July 2014
09:00

| South Africa | 0–6 | Australia |
|---|---|---|
| | Report | Mitton 8', 24'; Ciriello 27'; Orchard 46'; Govers 48', 64' |

Umpires:
Dan Barstow (ENG)
Gareth Greenfield (NZL)

28 July 2014
11:00

| Scotland | 4–3 | Wales |
|---|---|---|
| Grassick 14'; McIntyre 40'; Coultas 41'; Parkes 61' | Report | Gay 1', 3', 31' |

Umpires:
Peter Wright (RSA)
Raghu Prasad (IND)

29 July 2014
14:00

| India | 2–4 | Australia |
|---|---|---|
| R. Singh 35'; Ra. Singh 49' | Report | C. Ciriello 15', 50'; Orchard 17'; Whetton 27' |

Umpires:
Martin Madden (SCO)
Dan Barstow (ENG)

29 July 2014
16:00

| Wales | 1–5 | South Africa |
|---|---|---|
| Gay 67' | Report | Malgraff 9'; Smith 35+', 44'; Hykes 46'; Eustice 64' |

Umpires:
Eric Koh (MAS)
Lim Hong Zhen (SIN)

31 July 2014
14:00

| Australia | 5–0 | Scotland |
|---|---|---|
| Ciriello 19'; Gohdes 23', 25'; Govers 38'; Whetton 43' | Report |

Umpires:
Lim Hong Zhen (SIN)
Will Drury (WAL)

31 July 2014
16:00

| South Africa | 2–5 | India |
|---|---|---|
| Paton 42'; Smith 47' | Report | Raghunath 3'; R. Singh 9'; Ra. Singh 22'; Sowmarpet 26'; M. Singh 58' |

Umpires:
Adam Kearns (AUS)
Gareth Greenfield (NZL)

==== Pool B ====
| Team | Pld | W | D | L | GF | GA | GD | Pts | Qualification |
|---|---|---|---|---|---|---|---|---|---|
| New Zealand | 4 | 4 | 0 | 0 | 19 | 3 | +16 | 12 | Semi-finals |
| England | 4 | 3 | 0 | 1 | 18 | 5 | +13 | 9 | Semi-finals |
| Canada | 4 | 1 | 0 | 3 | 5 | 9 | −4 | 3 | |
| Malaysia | 4 | 1 | 0 | 3 | 6 | 18 | −12 | 3 | |
| Trinidad and Tobago | 4 | 1 | 0 | 3 | 6 | 19 | −13 | 3 | |

Source: FIH

24 July 2014
19:00

| England | 6–1 | Trinidad and Tobago |
|---|---|---|
| Jackson 7'; Lewers 25'; Gleghorne 27'; Catlin 51'; Roper 59'; Middleton 64' | Report | Pierre 29' |

Umpires:
Gareth Greenfield (NZL)
Gavin Caldecott (CAN)

24 July 2014
21:00

| New Zealand | 3–1 | Canada |
|---|---|---|
| Hayward 3'; Panchia 58'; A. Shaw 64' | Report | Panesar 20' |

Umpires:
Martin Madden (SCO)
Eric Koh (MAS)

26 July 2014
09:00

| New Zealand | 8–0 | Trinidad and Tobago |
|---|---|---|
| Burrows 7'; Haig 24', 34'; Neal 30', 68'; S. Child 40'; Inglis 54'; A. Shaw 59' | Report |

Umpires:
Raghu Prasad (IND)
Will Drury (WAL)

26 July 2014
11:00

| Malaysia | 2–0 | Canada |
|---|---|---|
| Nasruddin 15'; Tajuddin 69' | Report |

Umpires:
Peter Wright (RSA)
Dan Barstow (ENG)

27 July 2014
19:00

| Canada | 3–1 | Trinidad and Tobago |
|---|---|---|
| Tupper 28'; Pearson 44'; Jameson 60' | Report | Browne 57' |

Umpires:
Lim Hong Zhen (SIN)
Haider Rasool (PAK)

27 July 2014
21:00

| Malaysia | 1–8 | England |
|---|---|---|
| Saabah 26' | Report | Jackson 5', 44', 56', 61'; Dixon 50'; Gleghorne 64'; Roper 68'; Brogdon 69' |

Umpires:
Raghu Prasad (IND)
Martin Madden (SCO)

29 July 2014
09:00

| New Zealand | 2–1 | England |
|---|---|---|
| Hayward 51'; S. Child 68' | Report | Dixon 59' |

Umpires:
Adam Kearns (AUS)
Peter Wright (RSA)

29 July 2014
11:00

| Trinidad and Tobago | 4–2 | Malaysia |
|---|---|---|
| Pierre 8'; Browne 12', 16', 35+' | Report | Sumantri 25'; Rosli 70' |

Umpires:
Will Drury (WAL)
Gavin Caldecott (CAN)

31 July 2014
09:00

| England | 3–1 | Canada |
|---|---|---|
| Jackson 25', 54'; Middleton 36' | Report | Tupper 68' |

Umpires:
Martin Madden (SCO)
Eric Koh (MAS)

31 July 2014
11:00

| Malaysia | 1–6 | New Zealand |
|---|---|---|
| Rahim 59' | Report | Hayward 4', 48'; B. Shaw 29'; Haig 42'; Inglis 45'; McAleese 49' |

Umpires:
Dan Barstow (ENG)
Haider Rasool (PAK)

=== Fifth to tenth place classification ===
==== Ninth and tenth place ====
1 August 2014
18:00

| Wales | 2–0 | Trinidad and Tobago |
|---|---|---|
| Prosser 53'; Furlong 55' | Report |

Umpires:
Raghu Prasad (IND)
Gavin Caldecott (CAN)

==== Seventh and eighth place ====
1 August 2014
20:00

| Scotland | 1–2 | Malaysia |
|---|---|---|
| Grassick 12' | Report | Saabah 26'; Nasruddin 31' |

Umpires:
Gareth Greenfield (NZL)
Lim Hong Zhen (SIN)

==== Fifth and sixth place ====
2 August 2014
14:30

| South Africa | 7–3 | Canada |
|---|---|---|
| Norris-Jones 7', 68'; Drummond 33'; Smith 49'; Paton 57'; Halkett 62'; Hykes 66' | Report | Curran 17'; Smythe 28'; Johnston 37' |

Umpires:
Will Drury (WAL)
Haider Rasool (PAK)

=== Medal round ===
Semi-finals
2 August 2014
Australia | 4
England | 1
2 August 2014
New Zealand | 2
India | 3

Gold medal match
3 August 2014
Australia | 4
India | 0
Bronze medal match
3 August 2014
England | 3 (4)
New Zealand | 3 (2)

==== Semifinals ====
2 August 2014
10:00

| Australia | 4–1 | England |
|---|---|---|
| White 3'; Orchard 12'; Ciriello 62'; Ockenden 69' | Report | Martin 52' |

Umpires:
Martin Madden (SCO)
Peter Wright (RSA)

2 August 2014
12:15

| New Zealand | 2–3 | India |
|---|---|---|
| S. Child 2'; Haig 18' | Report | R. Singh 28'; Ra. Singh 42'; A. Singh 47' |

Umpires:
Adam Kearns (AUS)
Dan Barstow (ENG)

==== Bronze medal match ====
3 August 2014
10:00

| (bronze) England | 3–3 | New Zealand |
|---|---|---|
| Brogdon 29'; Jackson 30', 38' | Report | S. Child 12', 59'; Hayward 33' |
Penalties
| Jackson (penalty shoot-out scored); Catlin (penalty shoot-out scored); Middleton (penalty shoot-out scored); Jackson (penalty shoot-out scored) | 4–2 | (penalty shoot-out scored) Inglis; (penalty shoot-out missed) Hilton; (penalty shoot-out scored) Edwards; (penalty shoot-out missed) S. Child |

Umpires:
Adam Kearns (AUS)
Peter Wright (RSA)

==== Gold medal match ====
3 August 2014
12:15

| (gold) Australia | 4–0 | India (silver) |
|---|---|---|
| Ciriello 13', 29', 47'; Ockenden 51' | Report |

Umpires:
Dan Barstow (ENG)
Martin Madden (SCO)

== Final rankings ==
1. Australia
2. India
3. England
4. New Zealand
5. South Africa
6. Canada
7. Malaysia
8. Scotland
9. Wales
10. Trinidad and Tobago

== Goalscorers ==
There have been 148 goals scored in 27 matches, for an average of 5.48 goals per match (as of text).

9 goals

- (Australia) Chris Ciriello
- (England) Ashley Jackson

6 goals

- (India) Rupinder Pal Singh

5 goals

- (New Zealand) Simon Child
- (New Zealand) Andy Hayward
- (Australia) Jake Whetton

4 goals

- (Trinidad and Tobago) Kwan Browne
- (Wales) Richard Gay
- (Australia) Matt Gohdes
- (Australia) Kieran Govers
- (New Zealand) Nick Haig
- (South Africa) Austin Smith
- (India) V. R. Raghunath

3 goals

- (Australia) Simon Orchard
- (India) Ramandeep Singh

2 goals

- (England) Alastair Brogdon
- (New Zealand) Phil Burrows
- (India) Gurwinder Chandi
- (England) Adam Dixon
- (England) Mark Gleghorne
- (Scotland) Chris Grassick
- (South Africa) Julian Hykes
- (New Zealand) Hugo Inglis
- (South Africa) Ignatius Malgraff
- (England) Barry Middleton
- (Australia) Trent Mitton
- (Malaysia) Ahmad Nasruddin
- (New Zealand) Shay Neal
- (South Africa) Lloyd Norris-Jones
- (Australia) Eddie Ockenden
- (Scotland) Nicky Parkes
- (Trinidad and Tobago) Mickell Pierre
- (England) Phil Roper
- (Malaysia) Shahril Saabah
- (Canada) Scott Tupper

1 goal

- (Malaysia) Izwan Firdaus Ahmad Tajuddin
- (Scotland) Kenny Bain
- (England) Nick Catlin
- (Wales) Andrew Cornick
- (Scotland) Dan Coultas
- (South Africa) Andrew Cronje
- (Canada) Taylor Curran
- (South Africa) Tim Drummond
- (South Africa) Jethro Eustice
- (Wales) Gareth Furlong
- (South Africa) Rhett Halkett
- (Canada) David Jameson
- (Canada) Gordon Johnston
- (Wales) Daniel Kyriakides
- (England) Iain Lewers
- (England) Harry Martin
- (New Zealand) Shea MCaleese
- (Scotland) Gordon McIntyre
- (New Zealand) Arun Panchia
- (Canada) Sukhi Panesar
- (South Africa) Taine Paton
- (South Africa) Wade Paton
- (Canada) Mark Pearson
- (Wales) Lewis Prosser
- (Malaysia) Razie Rahim
- (Malaysia) Ramadan Rosli
- (New Zealand) Alex Shaw
- (New Zealand) Bradley Shaw
- (India) Akashdeep Singh
- (India) Gurbaj Singh
- (India) Manpreet Singh
- (Canada) Iain Smythe
- (India) S. V. Sunil
- (Malaysia) Norhizzat Sumantri
- (Australia) Tristan White

Source: FIH
