= Chris Ciriello =

Australian field hockey player

Personal information
- Full name: Christopher Ciriello
- Nickname: Big Dog
- Nationality: Australian
- Born: 1 October 1985 (age 41) Endeavour Hills, Victoria
- Height: 182 cm (6 ft 0 in)
- Weight: 84 kg (185 lb)
- Spouse: Heidi Ciriello (2010-present)

Sport
- Country: Australia
- Sport: Field hockey
- Event: Men's team
- Club: Doncaster Hockey Club
- Team: Victorian Vikings; Punjab Warriors (2012–present)
Medal record
Men's field hockey
Representing Australia
Olympic Games
Bronze medal – third place	2012 London	Team
World Cup
Gold medal – first place	2014 The Hague	Team
Champions Trophy
Gold medal – first place	2010 Mönchengladbach	Team
Gold medal – first place	2012 Melbourne	Team
Bronze medal – third place	2014 Bhubaneswar	Team
Commonwealth Games
Gold medal – first place	2010 Delhi	Team
Gold medal – first place	2014 Glasgow	Team

Christopher Ciriello (born 1 October 1985) is an Australian field hockey player. He plays for the Victorian Vikings in the Australian Hockey League. He made his senior national team début in January 2008. He earned a gold medal at the 2010 Men's Hockey Champions Trophy and at the 2010 and 2014 Commonwealth Games, as well as a bronze medal at the 2012 Summer Olympics.

== Personal ==
Ciriello is from Endeavour Hills, Victoria. In 2004, he worked part-time at JB HI-FI and was in his first year at the Australian College of Natural Medicine where he was studying remedial therapy. That year, he lost 35 kilograms (77 lb) because of his busy personal and sport schedule that included training up to six times a week, with some days having two practices. His father and grandfather were both hockey players before him, and he himself took up hockey at the age of 4. He now lives in Perth with his wife Heidi Ciriello.

== Field hockey ==
Ciriello had a hockey scholarship with the Victorian Institute of Sport in 2004. In 2004, he was a member of Australia's U21 national team and competed at the qualifiers for the U21 Junior World Cup Oceania Qualifiers in New Zealand.

Ciriello plays for the Doncaster Hockey Club. He plays for the Victorian Vikings in the Australian Hockey League. He played for the team in the first found of the 2011 season.

=== National team ===
In January 2008, Ciriello made his senior national team début at the Five Nations men's hockey tournament in South Africa. New national team coach Ric Charlesworth named the veteran Ciriello and fourteen players who had less than ten national team caps between them, in a bid to ready the team for the 2010 Commonwealth Games. In 2009, he represented the country on a tour of Europe. He competed in the third match of the tour against England where Australia won 5–4. In the game, he scored a hat trick. All three goals came off penalty shots during the first half. In 2009, he was a member of the national team during a five-game test series in Kuala Lumpur, Malaysia against Malaysia. He represented Australia at the 2010 Commonwealth Games. In the gold medal match against India that Australia won 8–0, he scored a goal. His coach Ric Charlesworth described his performance at the Games as having "taken his game to a new level". In May 2011, he played in the Azlan Shah Cup for Australia. The Cup featured teams from Pakistan, Malaysia, India, South Korea, Britain and New Zealand. In December 2011, he was named as one of twenty-eight players to be on the 2012 Summer Olympics Australian men's national training squad. This squad was narrowed in June 2012. He trained with the team from 18 January to mid-March in Perth, Western Australia. In February during the training camp, he played in a four nations test series with the teams being the Kookaburras, Australia A Squad, the Netherlands and Argentina.

=== Career highlight ===
In 2014, Ciriello showed why he is one of the most dangerous players in world hockey and one of the best drag flickers in the history of the game. The 'Big Dog', as he is nicknamed, slotted a hat trick of goals in both the finals of the World Cup and the Commonwealth Games leading Australia to victory. At the World Cup Cirello was the second highest scorer of the tournament with 7 goals while at the Commonwealth Games he led the field with 9 goals.

=== Coaching ===
In 2004, Ciriello coached year 9 at Wesley College in Glen Waverley, Victoria while his father Lou Ciriello coached year 10.

Ciriello coached a top tier group of young female athletes at Southern River Hockey Club, based in the south of Perth, WA.

Until recently, he was Analytical coach and Manager for the National Indian Men's Team based at Sports Authority of India Complex, Bangalore, India.
