= Mark Knowles (field hockey) =

Australian field hockey player

Mark Knowles OAM
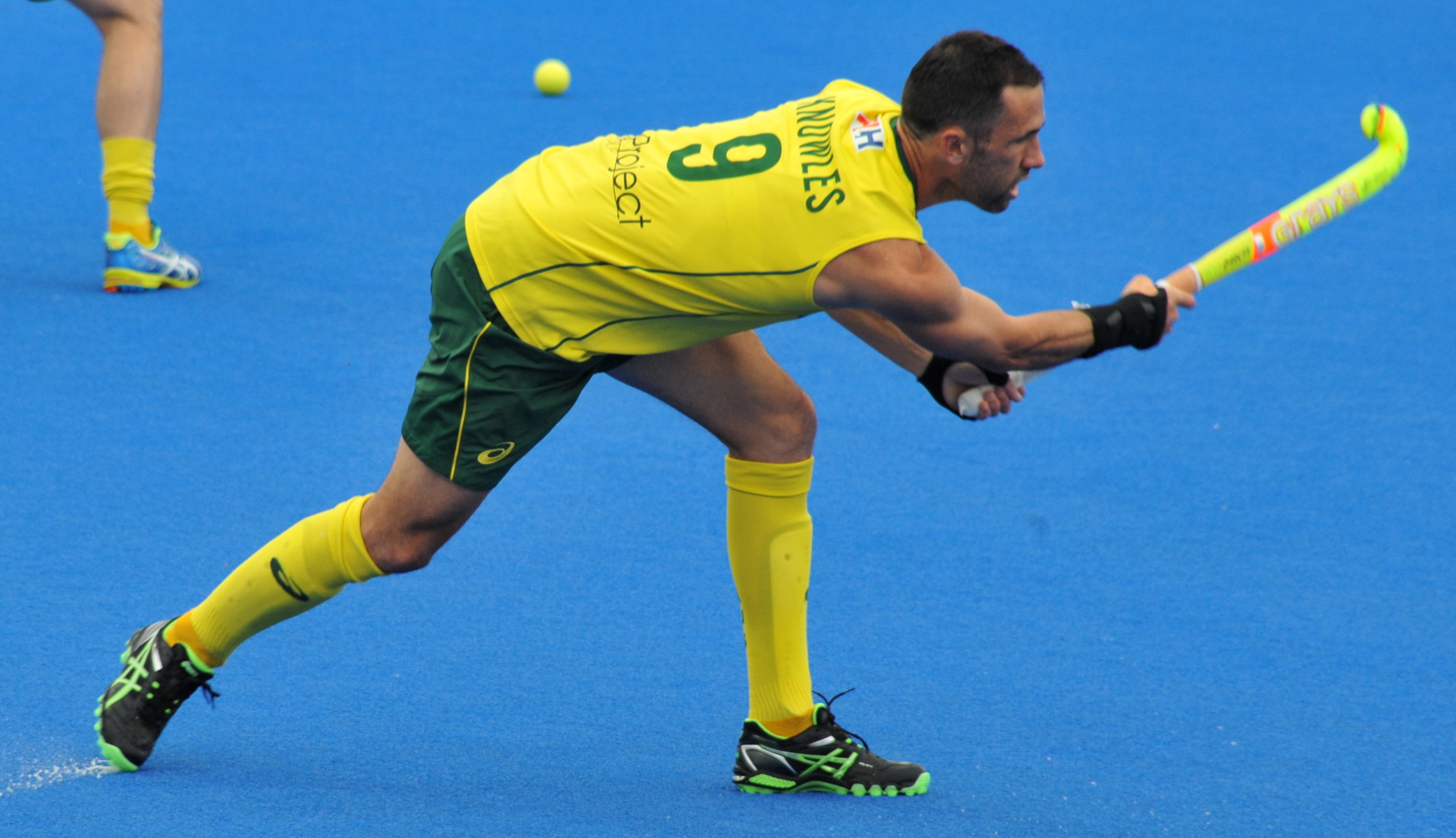

Personal information
- Nationality: Australian
- Born: 10 March 1984 (age 42)

Sport
- Country: Australia
- Sport: Field hockey
Medal record
Men's field hockey
Representing Australia
Olympic Games
Gold medal – first place	2004 Athens	Team
Bronze medal – third place	2008 Beijing	Team
Bronze medal – third place	2012 London	Team
World Cup
Gold medal – first place	2010 New Delhi
Gold medal – first place	2014 The Hague
Silver medal – second place	2006 Mönchengladbach
Champions Trophy
Gold medal – first place	2005 Chennai
Gold medal – first place	2008 Rotterdam
Gold medal – first place	2009 Melbourne
Gold medal – first place	2012 Melbourne
Silver medal – second place	2007 Kuala Lumpur
Oceania Cup
Gold medal – first place	2015 Stratford
Gold medal – first place	2017 Sydney
World League
Gold medal – first place	2014–15 Raipur	Team
Gold medal – first place	2016–17 Bhubaneswar	Team
Commonwealth Games
Gold medal – first place	2006 Melbourne	Team
Gold medal – first place	2010 Delhi	Team
Gold medal – first place	2014 Glasgow	Team
Gold medal – first place	2018 Gold Coast	Team

Mark William Knowles OAM (born 10 March 1984) is the Australian field hockey captain. He has played professional hockey in the Netherlands for HC Rotterdam. He plays for the Queensland Blades in the Australian Hockey League. He has been the captain of the Australia men's national field hockey team the Kookaburras since 2014. He won a gold medal at the 2004 Summer Olympics, the 2014 World Cup, the 2005 and 2012 Champions Trophy.His most recent achievements include coming second in the 2024 Memorial Cup match to the Northern Suburbs Eagles, as well as losing the 2024 BHA Grand Final to Labrador.

== Personal ==
Mark Knowles is from Rockhampton, Queensland. He lives in Brisbane with his wife, Kelly (sister of Australian Hockey teammate, Jamie Dwyer) and their two sons.

== Field hockey ==
Knowles played professional hockey in 2008 and 2011 in the Netherlands for HC Rotterdam. He plays for the Queensland Blades in the Australian Hockey League. In 2010, he played in the final game of the season for his team.

=== National team ===
Knowles is the captain of the Australia men's national field hockey team. In 2006, he represented Australia at the Azlan Shah tournament in Malaysia. He competed in the 2007 Champions Trophy competition for Australia. In December 2007, he was a member of the Kookaburras squad that competed in the Dutch Series in Canberra. In January 2008, he was a member of the senior national team that competed at the Five Nations men's hockey tournament in South Africa. He was a member of the 2009 Champions Trophy winning team, playing in the gold medal match against Germany that Australia won by a score of 5–3. New national team coach Ric Charlesworth named him, a returning member, and fourteen total new players who had few than 10 national team caps to the squad before in April 2009 in a bid to ready the team for the 2010 Commonwealth Games. He was a member of the national team in 2010. That year, he was a member of the team that finished first at the Hockey Champions Trophy. Because of other commitments, he could not compete at the Azlan Shah Cup in Malaysia in May 2011. In December 2011, he was named as one of twenty-eight players to be on the 2012 Summer Olympics Australian men's national training squad. This squad will be narrowed in June 2012. He trained with the team from 18 January to mid-March in Perth, Western Australia. In February during the training camp, he played in a four nations test series with the teams being the Kookaburras, Australia A Squad, the Netherlands and Argentina. He is one of several Queensland based players likely to play in a three-game test series to be played in Cairns, Queensland from 22 to 25 June against the New Zealand's Black Stickss. Final Olympic section will occur several days before this test and his inclusion in the series will be contingent upon being selected.

== Recognition ==
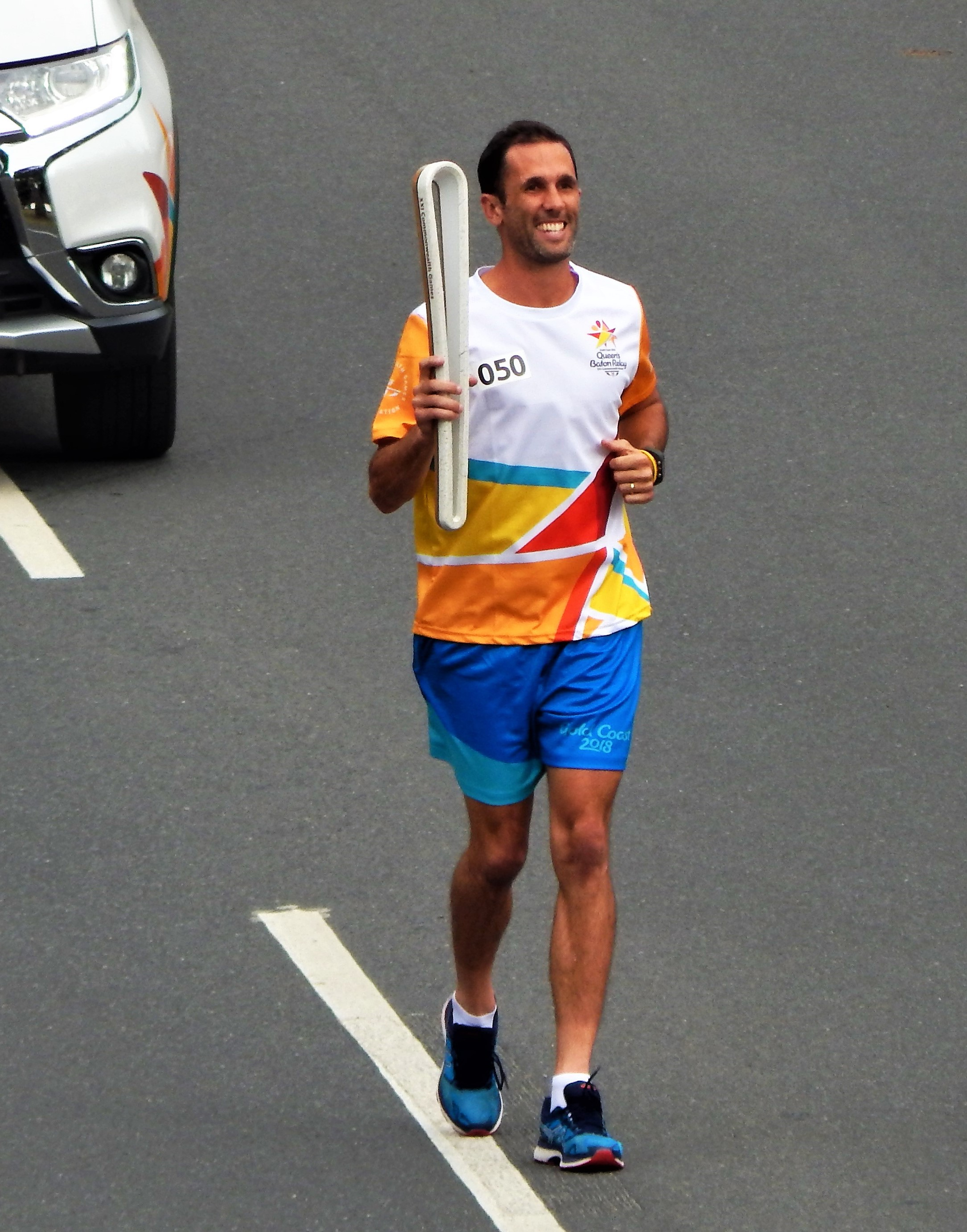
Mark Knowles during the Queen's Baton Relay in Rockhampton, 2018

In the 2005 Australia Day Honours, Knowles was awarded the Medal of the Order of Australia (OAM) "for service to sport as a Gold Medallist at the Athens 2004 Olympic Games."

In 2007, Knowles was honoured by being named the Young Player of the Year by the International Hockey Federation. In 2015, Knowles was honoured by being named the 2014 World Player of the Year, following on from his performances at the 2014 Hockey World Cup, by the International Hockey Federation. He has been the Kookaburras captain since 2014.

Knowles was the Australian flag bearer at the 2018 Commonwealth Games opening ceremony on 4 April 2018. He was also a baton runner during the Rockhampton leg of the Queen's Baton Relay on 23 March 2018 in the lead up to the Commonwealth Games.

In 2024, he was inducted into the Sport Australia Hall of Fame.

Preceded by Christopher Zeller	FIH Rising Star of the Year; 2007	Succeeded by Ashley Jackson
Preceded by Tobias Hauke	FIH Player of the Year; 2014	Succeeded by Robert van der Horst
