= Matthew Swann (field hockey) =

Australian field hockey player (born 1989)

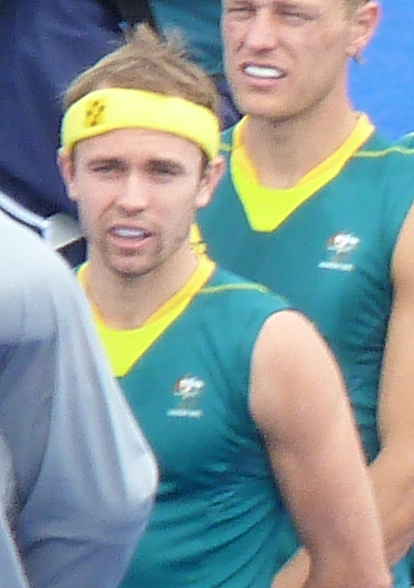
- Swann in 2012

Personal information
- Full name: Matthew David Swann
- Born: 16 May 1989 (age 37) Perth, Australia

Sport
- Sport: Field hockey
- Position: Defender
- Club: Klein Zwitserland
National team
Years	Team	Caps	Goals
2009–2020	Australia	204	(7)
Medal record
Men's field hockey
Representing Australia
Olympic Games
Bronze medal – third place	2012 London	Team
World Cup
Gold medal – first place	2010 New Delhi
Gold medal – first place	2014 The Hague
Bronze medal – third place	2018 Bhubaneswar
Oceania Cup
Gold medal – first place	2011 Hobart
Gold medal – first place	2017 Sydney
Gold medal – first place	2019 Rockhampton
Champions Trophy
Gold medal – first place	2009 Melbourne
Gold medal – first place	2010 Mönchengladbach
Gold medal – first place	2011 Auckland
Gold medal – first place	2012 Melbourne
Gold medal – first place	2016 London
Gold medal – first place	2018 Breda
World League
Gold medal – first place	2014–15 Raipur
Gold medal – first place	2016–17 Bhubaneswar
Commonwealth Games
Gold medal – first place	2010 New Delhi	Team
Gold medal – first place	2014 Glasgow	Team
- Updated on 19 May 2021

Matthew David Swann (born 16 May 1989) is an Australian field hockey player. He plays for the Queensland Blades in the Australian Hockey League. He is a member of the Australian men's national field hockey team, making his first cap in 2009. He won a gold medal at the 2011 Men's Hockey Champions Trophy and a bronze medal the 2012 Summer Olympics.

== Personal ==
Swann is from Queensland. He is 170 cm (5 ft 7 in) tall. He used to live in Herston, Queensland. He moved to Perth, Western Australia to spend more time with the national team.

== Field hockey ==
Swann is a defender. Luke Doerner gave him a yellow headband that he wears at every match. He played junior hockey in Mackay, Queensland. He currently resides in Perth, Western Australia. The national team was aware of him when he was competing in junior hockey. He plays for the Queensland Blades in the Australian Hockey League. In 2010, he played in the final game of the season for his state team in the Australian Hockey League. He played for the team in the first round of the 2011 season.

=== National team ===
Swann won his first cap for the Kookaburras in 2009. He played in the Champions Trophy tournament that year when his team won a gold medal. He was a member of the national team in 2010. That year, he was a member of the team that finished first at the Hockey Champions Trophy. In 2009, he was a member of the national team during a five-game test series in Kuala Lumpur, Malaysia against Malaysia. In May 2011, he played in the Azlan Shah Cup for Australia. The Cup featured teams from Pakistan, Malaysia, India, South Korea, Britain and New Zealand. He represented Australia at the Champions Trophy in New Zealand in 2011, where Australia won a gold medal for the fourth time in a row. In December 2011, he was named as one of twenty-eight players to be on the 2012 Summer Olympics Australian men's national training squad. This squad will be narrowed in June 2012. He trained with the team from 18 January to mid-March in Perth, Western Australia. In February during the training camp, he played in a four nations test series with the teams being the Kookaburras, Australia A Squad, the Netherlands and Argentina. He is one of several Queensland based players likely to play in a three-game test series to be played in Cairns, Queensland from 22 to 25 June against the New Zealand's Black Sticks. He was selected to play for the Kookaburras at the Olympic games in 2012, beating the United Kingdom in the Bronze medal match. At the 2012 Summer Olympics, he was part of the Australian team that won the bronze medal.

He was part of Australia's gold medal-winning team at the 2014 Commonwealth Games.

== Recognition ==
In 2011, Swann was honoured by being named the Young Player of the Year by the International Hockey Federation. In 2011, he was named in the World All-Star Team.

Preceded by Tobias Hauke	FIH Young Player of the Year; 2011	Succeeded by Florian Fuchs
