= Tristan White =

Australian field hockey player

Personal information
- Nickname: T-Bag
- Born: 11 July 1990 (age 35)

Sport
- Country: Australia
- Sport: Field hockey
Medal record
Representing Australia
Champions Trophy
Bronze medal – third place	2014 Bhubaneswar	Team
Commonwealth Games
Gold medal – first place	2014 Glasgow	Team

Tristan White (born 11 July 1990) is an Australian field hockey player. He competed in the men's hockey tournament at the 2014 Commonwealth Games where he won a gold medal.
