= Eddie Ockenden =

Australian field hockey player

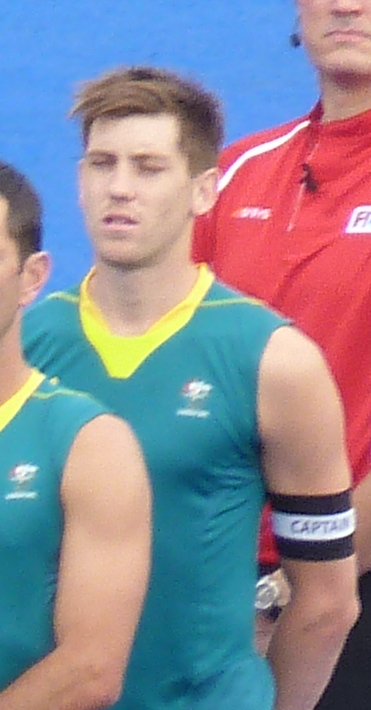
- Ockenden in 2012

Personal information
- Full name: Edward Clyve Ockenden
- Born: 3 April 1987 (age 39) Hobart, Tasmania, Australia
- Height: 1.80 m (5 ft 11 in)
- Weight: 73 kg (161 lb)

Sport
- Sport: Field hockey
- Position: Midfielder/Striker
National team
Years	Team	Caps	Goals
2006–	Australia	451	(71)
Medal record
Men's field hockey
Representing Australia
Olympic Games
Silver medal – second place	2020 Tokyo	Team
Bronze medal – third place	2008 Beijing	Team
Bronze medal – third place	2012 London	Team
World Cup
Gold medal – first place	2010 New Delhi
Gold medal – first place	2014 The Hague
Bronze medal – third place	2018 Bhubaneswar
Oceania Cup
Gold medal – first place	2013 Stratford
Gold medal – first place	2015 Stratford
Gold medal – first place	2017 Sydney
Gold medal – first place	2019 Rockhampton
Gold medal – first place	2023 Whangārei
FIH Pro League
Gold medal – first place	2019 Amstelveen
Champions Trophy
Gold medal – first place	2008 Rotterdam
Gold medal – first place	2009 Melbourne
Gold medal – first place	2010 Mönchengladbach
Gold medal – first place	2011 Auckland
Gold medal – first place	2012 Melbourne
Gold medal – first place	2016 London
Gold medal – first place	2018 Breda
Silver medal – second place	2007 Kuala Lumpur
Bronze medal – third place	2014 Bhubaneswar
World League
Gold medal – first place	2014–15 Raipur	Team
Gold medal – first place	2016–17 Bhubaneswar	Team
Commonwealth Games
Gold medal – first place	2010 Delhi	Team
Gold medal – first place	2014 Glasgow	Team
Gold medal – first place	2018 Gold Coast	Team
Gold medal – first place	2022 Birmingham	Team

Edward "Eddie" Clyve Ockenden (born 3 April 1987) is an Australian field hockey player. He plays in the midfielder and striker positions. He turned professional in 2008 and has played for teams in the Netherlands. He plays club hockey, having competed for a New Zealand team and Hobart, Tasmania side, North West Hobart Graduates (NWG). He also plays for the Tassie Tigers in the Australian Hockey League. He has represented Australia on the junior, intermediate, and senior level, earning a silver medal with the 2005 U21 team at the Junior World Cup.

As a member of the senior men's team, he represented Australia at the 2008 Games where he earned a bronze medal. He won a gold medal at the 2009 and 2011 Champions Trophy competitions. He won another gold medal with Australia at the 2010 Commonwealth Games. At the 2010 World Cup, he won a gold medal. He represents the Uttar Pradesh Wizards in the Hockey India League. At the 2012 Summer Olympics, he was again part of an Australian team that won the bronze medal.

== Personal life ==
Ockenden is from Moonah, Tasmania. He had completed one year of higher education by 2008, finishing a year of working towards a degree in commerce. He began playing hockey at the age of eight, encouraged by his mother, who was also a hockey player.

== Field hockey ==
Ockenden is a midfielder and striker. In 2006, he had a field hockey scholarship with the Australian Institute of Sport.

Ockenden plays club amateur hockey. In 2007, he was playing club hockey in New Zealand for a Canterbury side in the New Zealand national league. In 2011, he played club hockey in Hobart, for the North-West Graduates. That year, he played in the Southern Men's Hockey Grand Final.

=== Professional hockey ===
Ockenden turned professional in 2008, when he signed a deal and played for Laren, a Dutch team. His salary was not near the top of the league, where the best players earn in the six figures. In 2008, 2009 and 2011, he played professional hockey in the Netherlands.

=== State team ===
Ockenden plays for the Tassie Tigers in the Australian Hockey League. He was with the team in 2006 when he was a teenager. He played for the team in the first found of the 2011 season. He was a member of the Tassie Tigers in 2010. He played in a June 2010 game for the Tassie Tigers against New South Wales that New South Wales won 6–3. He scored a goal in the game. In 2010, after the league finals, he earned the AHL Player of the Tournament award.

=== Junior national team ===
Ockenden has represented Australia on the junior national level. In 2005, as a member of the U21 national team, he earned a silver medal at the Junior World Cup.

=== Senior national team ===
Ockenden is a member of the Kookaburras. His first national team cap for the Kookaburras happened in 2006. In 2006, he represented Australia at the Azlan Shah tournament in Malaysia. In 2007, he competed in the Oceania Olympic qualifying tournament. He played in the tournament game against New Zealand where Australia won 3–1. He did not compete in the 2007 Champions Trophy competition for Australia. In December 2007, he was a member of the Kookaburras squad that competed in the Dutch Series in Canberra. In January 2008, he was a member of the senior national team that competed at the Five Nations men's hockey tournament in South Africa.

He represented Australia at the 2008 Summer Olympics, where he won a bronze medal. These were his first Olympics and he was the youngest player on the Australian field hockey team. He was one of fourteen Tasmanians to represent Australia at the Games. He scored two goals in the bronze medal game against the Netherlands in the country's 6–1 victory. New national team coach Ric Charlesworth named him, a returning member, alongside fourteen total new players who had few than 10 national team caps to the squad before in April 2009 in a bid to ready the team for the 2010 Commonwealth Games. In 2009, he participated in two test matched against Spain in Perth in the lead up to the Champions Trophy.

In 2009, he won a gold medal at the Men's Hockey Champions Trophy competition. In 2010, he represented Australia at the 2010 Commonwealth Games, where he won a gold medal when his side beat India 8–0 in front of an Indian home crowd. His coach Ric Charlesworth described his performance at the Games as "exceptional." In 2010, he won a gold medal at the World Cup. In the 2–1 victory in the gold medal round against Germany, he scored a goal in the sixth minute.

While at the World Cup, the Indian hosts provided extensive security for him and other hockey competitors. Jamie Dwyer said "it was the tightest security he had ever seen as a competitor in an international competition". Competing at the 2010 World Cup in India was the first time he had visited India. Because of other commitments, he could not compete at the Azlan Shah Cup in Malaysia in May 2011. In 2011, he won a gold medal in the Champions Trophy, scoring a goal in the gold medal match. He captained the Australian side in the competition.

In December 2011, he was named as one of twenty-eight players to be on the 2012 Summer Olympics Australian men's national training squad. This squad will be narrowed in June 2012. He trained with the team from 18 January to mid-March in Perth, Western Australia. In February during the training camp, he played in a four nations test series with the teams being the Kookaburras, Australia A Squad, the Netherlands and Argentina. In a game for the Kookaburras against Argentina, his team won 4-0 and he scored a goal.

Ockenden was selected in the Kookaburras Olympics squad for the Tokyo 2020 Olympics. The team reached the final for the first time since 2004. They lost to Belgium in a shootout.

== Recognition ==
In 2007 and 2008, he was named the best young player of the tournament at the Champions Trophy competition.

In 2008, he was honoured by being named the Young Player of the Year by the International Hockey Federation.

In 2010, he earned the Kookaburra's 2010 Player of the Year award, an award he shared with Simon Orchard.

In 2011, he was named in the World All-Star Team.

Preceded by (Australia) Mark Knowles	FIH Young Player of the Year; 2008	Succeeded by (England) Ashley Jackson

Olympic Games
Preceded by Patty Mills (with Cate Campbell)	Flagbearer for Australia (with Jessica Fox); Paris 2024	Succeeded by Incumbent
