= Australian Hockey League =

Non-professional field hockey league

- Sport: Field Hockey
- Founded: M: 1991; 35 years ago W: 1993; 33 years ago
- Folded: 2018; 8 years ago
- Replaced by: Hockey One
- No. of teams: 8
- Country: Australia
- Last champions: M: (Queensland) QLD Blades; W: (New South Wales) NSW Arrows
- Most titles: M: (Queensland) QLD Blades (10 titles); W: (New South Wales) NSW Arrows (10 titles)
- Website: hockey.org.au/ahl

The Australian Hockey League (AHL) was Australia's premier national domestic field hockey competition. Despite its non-professional nature, it was considered one of the strongest and most competitive national hockey leagues in the world, consisting of both men's and women's competition. It included many players from the Kookaburras and the Hockeyroos, with participating in the AHL serving as a selection requirement for all Australian national squad members.

The last edition of the AHL was contested in 2018, with the league was replaced by Hockey One, Australia's new elite domestic hockey competition.

== History ==
The first season of the Australian Men's National Hockey League (former AHL) took place in 1991, when the perpetual national championship was replaced by a new-look format. The competition, which was played over a two-month period, did not limit player eligibility to state of origin. Six teams competed in the first year – Brisbane Blades, Melbourne Redbacks, Adelaide Hotshots, Canberra Lakers, Sydney Stingrays and Tamworth Frogs. In 1991 and 1992, both the National Championship and the National Hockey League was played, placing a financial burden on the states. From 1993, the decision was made to play the National Hockey League as the sole competition in determining Australia's champion State.

The league has since evolved into an eight team competition played on a home and away basis before climaxing with a finals series. In 2000, 2004 and 2008 however, the league reverted to a two-week championship format. This format is designed to replicate the intense nature and heavy playing schedule of the Olympic Games. The league embraced some big changes leading into the 2001 season as the former Men's and Women's National Hockey League combined to form the Australian Hockey League (AHL). Both the men's and women's leagues shifted their seasons from mid-year to February–April and a unique format was adopted. The format devised allows a high level of hockey to be seen across Australia through four weeks of home-and-away competition. The league then climaxes with a full finals week that comprises three-round matches, the semi-finals and finals.

== Competition Format and Rules ==
=== Past Editions ===
Prior to 2018, the Australian Hockey League was run as a centralised tournament.

Teams were split into two pools, Pool A and Pool B, playing in a single round robin format. At the conclusion of the pool stage, the top two teams entered the medal round, while the remaining teams played in the classification round.

=== 2018 Australian Hockey League ===
Like in previous editions, teams are split into Pool A and Pool B. At the conclusion of the pool stage however, teams contest in a quarterfinal format, with each team still eligible to contest the medal round.

==== 2018 Rule Innovations ====
Played under FIH international rules. 4 x 15-minute quarters.

- At the end of the second and fourth quarters, one team is given a PumpPlay. During this 5-minute period, teams are reduced to 9 players, and goals for the team in possession of the PumpPlay are worth double.

If a field goal or penalty stroke is scored, that player has an immediate one on one with the goalkeep for an extra goal.

If any match culminates in a draw, the teams will contest a penalty shoot-out to determine a winner.

==== Point system ====
2018 Points System
W	WD	LD	L
5	3	2	0

== Australian Hockey League Teams ==
=== Australian Capital Territory ===
Australian Capital Territory
Australian Capital Territory	Teams		AHL Titles	Years	Home Stadium
Australian Capital Territory	Men	Canberra Lakers	0		National Hockey Centre, Canberra
Australian Capital Territory	Women	Canberra Strikers	0		National Hockey Centre, Canberra

Both the men's and women's Australian Capital Territory representative teams entered the AHL in the inaugural year for each gender, 1991 and 1993 respectively.

The men and women have both previously represented ACT under different names. The men have represented as the ACT Lakers (2011), while the women have previously represented as the ACTAS Strikers (1995–1996) and the ACT Strikers (2011).

=== New South Wales ===
New South Wales
New South Wales	Teams		AHL Titles	Years	Home Stadium
New South Wales	Men	NSW Waratahs	3	1997, 2001, 2005	Sydney Olympic Park, Sydney
New South Wales	Women	NSW Arrows	10	1993, 1996, 1998, 1999, 2000, 2001, 2002, 2009, 2014, 2018	Sydney Olympic Park, Sydney

Both the men's and women's New South Wales representative teams entered the AHL in the inaugural year for each gender, 1991 and 1993 respectively.

The men and women have both previously represented NSW under different names. The men have represented as the Sydney Stingrays (1991–1992), the Sydney Scorpions (1993–1994), the NSW Warriors (1995–2000) and the NSW Panthers (2001–2004). The women have previously represented as the NSWIS Arrows (2000–2004).

=== Northern Territory ===
Northern Territory
Northern Territory	Teams		AHL Titles	Years	Home Stadium
Northern Territory	Men	NT Stingers	0		Marrara Hockey Centre, Darwin
Northern Territory	Women	NT Pearls	0		Marrara Hockey Centre, Darwin

Both the men's and women's Northern Territory representative teams entered the AHL at different times. While the women joined in the tournament's inaugural year of 1993, the men didn't join until 1998.

While participating for the first three years, the women's team were absent from the AHL between 1996 and 1999.

The men and women have both previously represented NT under different names. The men have represented as the Territory Stingers (2001–2008) and the Darwin Stingers (2010, 2012), while the women have represented as the Darwin Blazez (1993–1995) and the Territory Pearls (2006–2007, 2010).

=== Queensland ===
Queensland
Queensland	Teams		AHL Titles	Years	Home Stadium
Queensland	Men	QLD Blades	10	1991, 2003, 2004, 2006, 2007, 2010, 2012, 2013, 2015, 2018	Queensland State Hockey; Centre, Brisbane
Queensland	Women	QLD Scorchers	5	1997, 2005, 2013, 2015, 2016	Queensland State Hockey; Centre, Brisbane

Both the men's and women's Queensland representative teams entered the AHL in the inaugural year for each gender, 1991 and 1993 respectively.

The men and women have both previously represented QLD under different names. The men have represented as the Brisbane Blades (1991–1997), while the women have represented as the QAS Scorchers (1995–1997, 2000).

=== South Australia ===
South Australia
South Australia	Teams		AHL Titles	Years	Home Stadium
South Australia	Men	SA Hotshots	0		State Hockey Centre, Adelaide
South Australia	Women	SA Suns	2	1995, 2011	State Hockey Centre, Adelaide

Both the men's and women's South Australia representative teams entered the AHL in the inaugural year for each gender, 1991 and 1993 respectively.

The men and women have both previously represented SA under different names. The men have represented as the Adelaide Hotshots (1991–2007) and the Southern Hotshots (2008–2014), while the women have represented as the Adelaide Suns (1993–2007) and the Southern Suns (2008–2014).

=== Tasmania ===
Tasmania
Tasmania	Teams		AHL Titles	Years	Home Stadium
Tasmania	Men	Tassie Tigers	1	2014	Tasmanian Hockey Centre, Hobart
Tasmania	Women	Tassie Van Demons	0		Tasmanian Hockey Centre, Hobart

Both the men's and women's Tasmania representative teams entered the AHL following the inaugural year for each gender. The men joined in 1992, while the women joined in 1996.

=== Victoria ===
Victoria
Victoria (state)	Teams		AHL Titles	Years	Home Stadium
Victoria (state)	Men	VIC Vikings	4	1996, 1998, 2016, 2017	State Netball and Hockey; Centre, Melbourne
Victoria (state)	Women	VIC Vipers	3	2003, 2012, 2017	State Netball and Hockey; Centre, Melbourne

Both the men's and women's Victoria representative teams entered the AHL in the inaugural year for each gender, 1991 and 1993 respectively.

The men and women have both previously represented VIC under different names. The men have represented as the Melbourne Redbacks (1991–1992, 1994–2001), the VIS Redbacks (1993) and the Azuma Vikings (2005–2006), while the women have previously represented as the VIS Vipers (1993–2004) and the Azuma Vipers (2005–2006).

=== Western Australia ===
Western Australia
Western Australia	Teams		AHL Titles	Years	Home Stadium
Western Australia	Men	WA Thundersticks	9	1992, 1993, 1995, 1999, 2000, 2002, 2008, 2009, 2011	Perth Hockey Stadium, Perth
Western Australia	Women	WA Diamonds	6	1994, 2004, 2006, 2007, 2008, 2010	Perth Hockey Stadium, Perth

Both the men's and women's Western Australia representative teams entered the AHL at different times. While the women joined in the tournament's inaugural year of 1993, the men didn't join until 1992.

The men and women have both previously represented WA under different names. The men have represented as the Perth Thundersticks (1992, 1994–2001) and the WAIS Thundersticks (1993), while the women have previously represented as the WAIS Diamonds (1993–2002).

== Men's AHL ==
=== Statistics ===
Men's Australian Hockey League
Year	Champion	Runner-up	Player of the Tournament	Highest Goalscorer	Player of the Final
1991	Brisbane Blades	Melbourne Redbacks	Colin Batch (Redbacks)	David Shaw (Redbacks)	–
1992	Perth Thundersticks	Brisbane Blades	Jay Stacy (Redbacks); Todd Williams (Tigers)	–	–
1993	WAIS Thundersticks	Sydney Scorpions	–	–	–
1994	NHL Not Played in 1994				
1995	Perth Thundersticks	Brisbane Blades	Lachlan Elmer (Hotshots)	Bobby Crutchley (Lakers)	–
1996	Melbourne Redbacks	Brisbane Blades	Jay Stacy (Redbacks)	Greg Corbitt (Thundersticks); Jeremy Hiskins (Redbacks)	–
1997	NSW Warriors	Perth Thundersticks	Jay Stacy (Redbacks)	Glen Kingston (Lakers)	–
1998	Melbourne Redbacks	Canberra Lakers	Daniel Sproule (Tigers)	Daniel Davison (Thundersticks)	–
1999	Perth Thundersticks	QLD Blades	Michael York (Lakers)	Craig Keenan (Tigers)	–
2000	Perth Thundersticks	NSW Warriors	Brent Livermore (Warriors)	Craig Keenan (Tigers)	–
2001	NSW Panthers	Perth Thundersticks	Matthew Wells (Tigers)	Michael McCann (Panthers)	–
2002	WA Thundersticks	QLD Blades	Zain Wright (Tigers)	Andrew Smith (Vikings)	–
2003	QLD Blades	WA Thundersticks	Matthew Wells (Tigers)	Andrew Smith (Vikings)	–
2004	QLD Blades	WA Thundersticks	Stephen Mowlam (Vikings)	Troy Elder (Blades)	Dean Butler (Blades)
2005	NSW Waratahs	QLD Blades	Rob Hammond (Blades)	Taeke Taekema (Waratahs)	Michael McCann (Waratahs)
2006	QLD Blades	Tassie Tigers	Mark Knowles (Blades)	Chris Ciriello (Vikings)	Dean Butler (Blades)
2007	QLD Blades	WA Thundersticks	Bevan George (Thundersticks)	Marcus Richardson (Tigers)	Mark Knowles (Blades)
2008	WA Thundersticks	QLD Blades	Bevan George (Thundersticks)	Luke Doerner (Vikings)	Aaron Hopkins (Thundersticks)
2009	WA Thundersticks	QLD Blades	Brent Livermore (Waratahs)	Jason Wilson (Blades)	Graeme Begbie (Thundersticks)
2010	QLD Blades	NSW Waratahs	Des Abbott (Stingers); Simon Orchard (Waratahs)	Josh Miller (Waratahs)	Jason Wilson (Blades)
2011	WA Thundersticks	NSW Waratahs	Eddie Ockenden (Tigers)	Wouter Hermkens (Lakers); Eddie Ockenden (Tigers); Sam Pike (Thundersticks)	Sam Pike (Thundersticks)
2012	QLD Blades	WA Thundersticks	Simon Orchard (Waratahs)	Chris Ciriello (Vikings)	Matthew Swann (Blades)
2013	QLD Blades	VIC Vikings	Eddie Ockenden (Tigers)	Aaron Kershaw (Lakers); Mark Paterson (Waratahs)	–
2014	Tassie Tigers	WA Thundersticks	Eddie Ockenden (Tigers)	Blake Govers (Waratahs)	Tristan Clemons (Tigers)
2015	QLD Blades	WA Thundersticks	Eddie Ockenden (Tigers)	Blake Govers (Waratahs)	Cale Cramer (Blades)
2016	VIC Vikings	WA Thundersticks	Flynn Ogilvie (Waratahs)	Chris Ciriello (Vikings)	Chris Ciriello (Vikings)
2017	VIC Vikings	QLD Blades	Mark Knowles (Blades)	Kieron Arthur (Tigers); Chris Ciriello (Vikings)	Robert Bell (Blades)
2018	QLD Blades	NSW Waratahs	Jake Whetton (Blades)	Blake Govers (Waratahs)	Corey Weyer (Blades)

Men's Australian Hockey League
Year	Goalkeeper of the Tournament	Play the Whistle
2012	–	Canberra Lakers
2013	–	–
2014	Leon Hayward (Stingers)	Tassie Tigers
2015	Andrew Charter (Lakers)	Tassie Tigers
2016	Tyler Lovell (Thundersticks)	WA Thundersticks
2017	Johan Durst (Vikings)	QLD Blades
2018	Andrew Charter (Lakers)	–
