= Simon Orchard =

Australian field hockey player

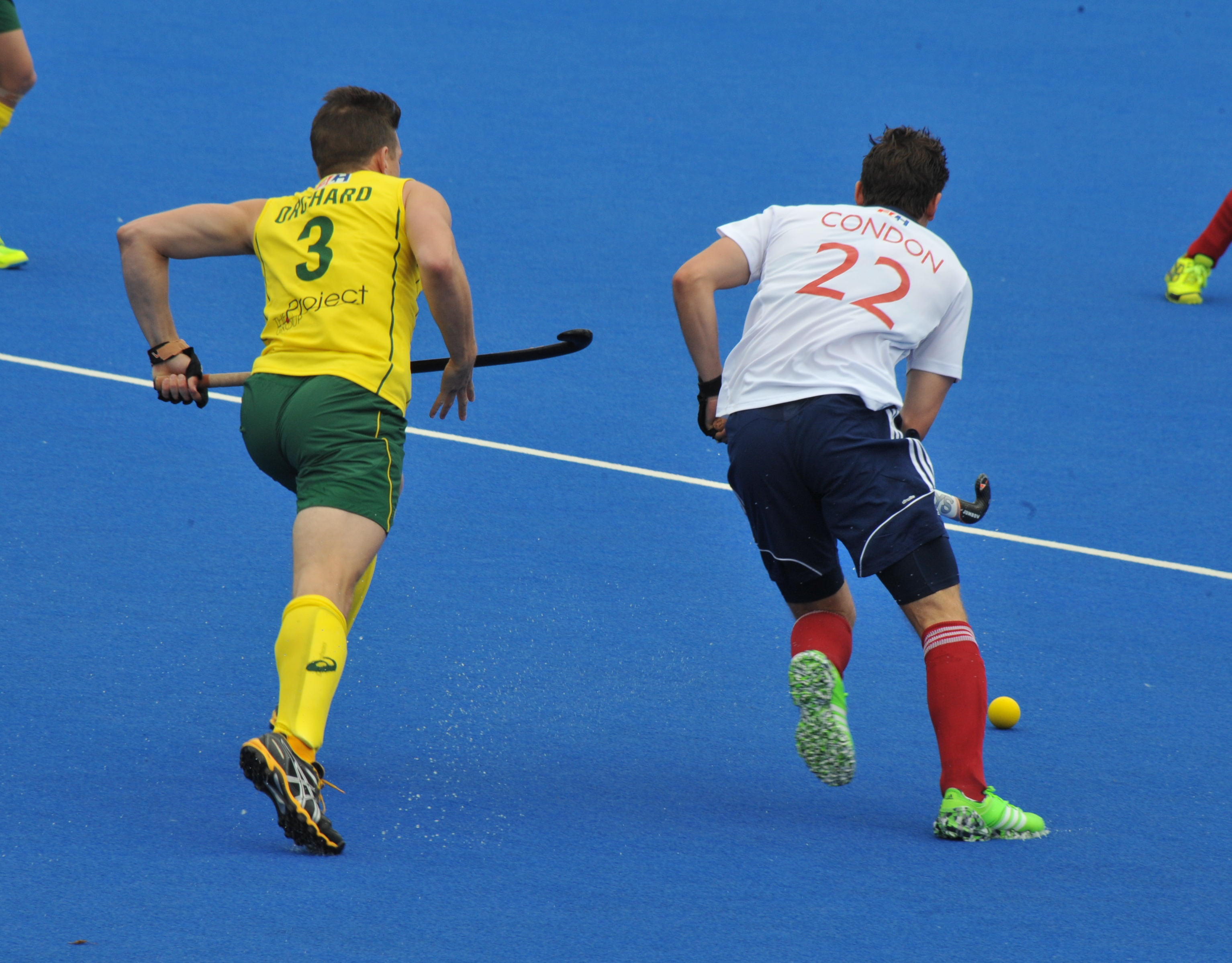
- Simon Orchard (left) with David Condon

Personal information
- Nationality: Australian

Sport
- Country: Australia
- Sport: Field hockey
- Event: Men's team
- Team: Kookaburras
- Retired: Yes

Achievements and titles
- Olympic finals: Two
Medal record
Men's field hockey
Representing Australia
Olympic Games
Bronze medal – third place	2012 London	Team
World Cup
Gold medal – first place	2010 New Delhi	Team
Gold medal – first place	2014 The Hague	Team
Champions Trophy
Gold medal – first place	2009 Melbourne	Team
Gold medal – first place	2012 Melbourne	Team
Bronze medal – third place	2014 Bhubaneswar	Team
Hockey at the Commonwealth Games
Gold medal – first place	2010 Delhi	Team
Gold medal – first place	2014 Glasgow	Team

Simon Orchard (born July 1986) is an Australian field hockey player. He plays for New South Wales in the Australian Hockey League. He is a member of the Australia men's national field hockey team and has won several medals with them including gold at the 2009 Men's Hockey Champions Trophy, gold at the 2010 Men's Hockey World Cup and gold at the 2010 and 2014 Commonwealth Games.

== National team ==
Orchard is a member of the Kookaburras. In January 2008, he made his senior national team debut at the Five Nations men's hockey tournament in South Africa. He represented Australia at the 2009 Champions Trophy, where his team earned a gold medal. New national team coach Ric Charlesworth named him, a returning member, alongside fourteen total new players who had few than 10 national team caps to the squad before in April 2009 in a bid to ready the team for the 2010 Commonwealth Games. In 2010, he won a gold medal at the World Cup. He represented Australia at the 2010 Commonwealth Games. In the gold medal match against India that Australia won 8–0, he scored a goal. In May 2011, he played in the Azlan Shah Cup for Australia. The Cup featured teams from Pakistan, Malaysia, India, South Korea, Britain and New Zealand. In December 2011, he was named as one of twenty-eight players to be on the 2012 Summer Olympics Australian men's national training squad. This squad was narrowed in June 2012. He trained with the team from 18 January to mid-March in Perth, Western Australia. In February during the training camp, he played in a four nations test series with the teams being the Kookaburras, Australia A Squad, the Netherlands and Argentina. He played for the Kookoaburras against Argentina in the second game of the series where his team won 3–1. He scored a goal for his team. In another game against Argentina at the same competition, his team won 4-0 and he scored a goal. He was selected to play for Australia in the 2012 Summer Olympics, scoring two goals, including one in the bronze medal match where Australia beat Great Britain 3–1.

== Recognition ==
In 2010, Orchard earned the Kookaburra's 2010 Player of the Year award, an award he shared with Eddie Ockenden.
