= Field hockey at the 2016 Summer Olympics – Men's team squads =

Twelve national teams were competing in the men's Olympic field hockey tournament at the 2016 Summer Olympics in Rio de Janeiro. Sixteen players were officially enrolled in each squad. Two reserve players could also be nominated to be available should a player enrolled in the official squad become injured during the tournament.

== Pool A ==
=== Australia ===
The following is the Australia roster in the men's field hockey tournament of the 2016 Summer Olympics. Aran Zalewski replaced Tristan White after he tore his posterior cruciate ligament a month before the games.

Head coach: Graham Reid

1. Jamie Dwyer
3. Simon Orchard
4. Glenn Turner
5. Chris Ciriello
6. Matt Dawson
9. Mark Knowles (C)
11. Eddie Ockenden
12. Jake Whetton
13. Blake Govers
16. Matthew Gohdes
17. Aran Zalewski
19. Tim Deavin
20. Matthew Swann
23. Daniel Beale
30. Andrew Charter (GK)
31. Fergus Kavanagh

Reserves:

- Jeremy Hayward
- Tom Craig
- Tyler Lovell

=== Belgium ===
The following is the Belgium roster in the men's field hockey tournament of the 2016 Summer Olympics.

Head coach: Shane McLeod

4. Arthur Van Doren
7. John-John Dohmen (C)
8. Florent van Aubel
9. Sebastien Dockier
10. Cédric Charlier
12. Gauthier Boccard
15. Emmanuel Stockbroekx
17. Thomas Briels
19. Felix Denayer
21. Vincent Vanasch (GK)
22. Simon Gougnard
25. Loïck Luypaert
27. Tom Boon
28. Jérôme Truyens
29. Elliot Van Strydonck
32. Tanguy Cosyns

Reserves:

- Alexandre de Paeuw
- Jeremy Gucassoff (GK)
- Alexander Hendrickx

=== Brazil ===
The following is the Brazil roster in the men's field hockey tournament of the 2016 Summer Olympics.

Head coach: Sidney Rocha

1. Thiago Bomfim (GK)
2. Bruno Mendonça
5. Joaquín Lopez
6. Adam Imer
7. André Patrocínio (C)
8. Yuri van der Heijden
9. Stephane Vehrle-Smith
10. Matheus Borges
11. Lucas Paixão
13. Bruno Paes
14. Ernst Rost-Onnes
15. Patrick van der Heijden
19. Rodrigo Steimbach
23. Christopher McPherson
27. Paulo Batista Junior
31. Rodrigo Faustino (GK)

Reserves:

- Marcos Pasin
- Augusto Felipe

=== Great Britain ===
The following is the Great Britain roster in the men's field hockey tournament of the 2016 Summer Olympics.

Head coach: Bobby Crutchley

1. George Pinner (GK)
5. David Ames
6. Henry Weir
7. Ashley Jackson
8. Simon Mantell
9. Harry Martin
11. Alastair Brogdon
12. Michael Hoare
13. Samuel Ward
14. Mark Gleghorne
16. Adam Dixon
17. Barry Middleton (C)
22. David Condon
24. Iain Lewers
26. Nicholas Catlin
27. Daniel Fox
31. Ian Sloan

Reserves:

- James Bailey
- Dan Shingles

=== New Zealand ===
The following is the New Zealand roster in the men's field hockey tournament of the 2016 Summer Olympics.

Head coach: Colin Batch

1. James Coughlan
6. Simon Child (C)
9. Blair Hilton
10. Ryan Archibald
12. Bradley Shaw
17. Nic Woods
20. Devon Manchester (GK)
21. Kane Russell
22. Blair Tarrant
23. Shay Neal
24. Arun Panchia
25. Shea McAleese
27. Stephen Jenness
29. Hugo Inglis
31. Hayden Phillips
32. Nick Wilson

Reserves:

- Marcus Child
- Nick Haig

=== Spain ===
The following is the Spain roster in the men's field hockey tournament of the 2016 Summer Olympics.

Head coach: Fred Soyez

1. Francisco Cortés (GK)
3. Sergi Enrique
5. Bosco Pérez-Pla
6. Miquel Delás
7. Pau Quemada
8. Viçens Ruiz
9. Álvaro Iglesias
10. David Alegre (C)
11. Roc Oliva
12. Jordi Carrera
13. Andrés Mir
17. Xavi Lleonart
19. Marc Sallés
20. Salva Piera
21. Álex Casasayas
22. Manel Terraza
23. Josep Romeu

Reserves:

- Mario Fernández

== Pool B ==
=== Argentina ===
The following is the Argentina roster in the men's field hockey tournament of the 2016 Summer Olympics.

Head coach: Carlos Retegui

1. Juan Manuel Vivaldi (GK)
2. Gonzalo Peillat
4. Juan Ignacio Gilardi
5. Pedro Ibarra (C)
7. Facundo Callioni
8. Lucas Rey
10. Matías Paredes
11. Joaquín Menini
12. Lucas Vila
14. Luca Masso
16. Ignacio Ortiz
17. Juan Martín López
19. Juan Manuel Saladino
20. Isidoro Ibarra
22. Matías Rey
24. Manuel Brunet
26. Agustín Mazzilli
27. Lucas Rossi

Reserves:

- Tomás Santiago (GK)

=== Canada ===
The following was the Canada roster in the men's field hockey tournament of the 2016 Summer Olympics. The roster consisted of 16 athletes.

Head coach: Anthony Farry

2. Benjamin Martin
4. Scott Tupper (C)
5. Devohn Noronha-Teixeira
7. Gabriel Ho-Garcia
10. Keegan Pereira
11. Jagdish Gill
14. Adam Froese
16. Gordon Johnston
17. Brenden Bissett
19. Mark Pearson
21. Matthew Sarmento
23. Iain Smythe
26. Matthew Guest
27. Sukhi Panesar
29. Taylor Curran
30. David Carter (GK)

=== Germany ===
The following is the German roster in the men's field hockey tournament of the 2016 Summer Olympics.

Head coach: Valentin Altenburg

1. Nicolas Jacobi (GK)
2. Mathias Müller
3. Linus Butt
6. Martin Häner (C)
7. Moritz Trompertz
8. Mats Grambusch
10. Christopher Wesley
12. Timm Herzbruch
13. Tobias Hauke
15. Tom Grambusch
17. Christopher Rühr
20. Martin Zwicker
21. Moritz Fürste
23. Florian Fuchs
27. Timur Oruz
29. Niklas Wellen

Reserves:

- Tobias Walter (GK)
- Oskar Deecke
- Oliver Korn

=== India ===
The following is the India roster in the men's field hockey tournament of the 2016 Summer Olympics.

Head coach: Roelant Oltmans

1. Harmanpreet Singh
3. Rupinder Pal Singh
5. Kothajit Singh
6. Surender Kumar
7. Manpreet Singh
8. Sardara Singh
12. V. R. Raghunath
15. S. K. Uthappa
16. P. R. Sreejesh (C & GK)
17. Danish Mujtaba
22. Devinder Walmiki
24. S. V. Sunil
27. Akashdeep Singh
29. Chinglensana Singh
31. Ramandeep Singh
32. Nikkin Thimmaiah

Reserves:

- Vikas Dahiya
- Pardeep Mor

=== Ireland ===
The following is the Irish roster in the men's field hockey tournament of the 2016 Summer Olympics.

Head coach: Craig Fulton

1. David Harte (GK) (C)
3. John Jackson
4. Jonathan Bell
6. Ronan Gormley
7. Michael Watt
8. Chris Cargo
10. Alan Sothern
11. John Jermyn
12. Eugene Magee
13. Peter Caruth
14. Kirk Shimmins
16. Shane O'Donoghue
20. Michael Darling
24. Kyle Good
26. Paul Gleghorne
27. Conor Harte

Reserves:

- Tim Cockram
- Michael Robson
- David Fitzgerald

=== Netherlands ===
The following is the Netherlands roster in the men's field hockey tournament of the 2016 Summer Olympics.

Head coach: Max Caldas

1. Jaap Stockmann (GK)
6. Glenn Schuurman
8. Billy Bakker
9. Seve van Ass
10. Valentin Verga
11. Jeroen Hertzberger
12. Sander de Wijn
13. Sander Baart
14. Robbert Kemperman
16. Mirco Pruyser
19. Bob de Voogd
21. Jorrit Croon
22. Rogier Hofman
24. Robert van der Horst (C)
29. Hidde Turkstra
30. Mink van der Weerden

Reserves:

- Pirmin Blaak (GK)
- Constantijn Jonker
