= 2018 Men's Hockey World Cup squads =

This article lists the confirmed squads for the 2018 Men's Hockey World Cup tournament held in Bhubaneswar, India between 28 November and 16 December 2018. The sixteen national teams were required to register a playing squad of eighteen players and two reserves.

Age, caps and club as of 28 November 2018.

== Pool A ==
=== Argentina ===
The squad was announced on 2 November 2018.

Head Coach: Germán Orozco

| No. | Pos. | Player | Date of birth (age) | Caps | Club |
|---|---|---|---|---|---|
| 1 | GK | Juan Manuel Vivaldi | 17 July 1979 (aged 39) | 246 | (Argentina) Banco Provincia |
| 2 | DF | Gonzalo Peillat | 12 August 1992 (aged 26) | 145 | (Germany) Mannheimer HC |
| 4 | DF | Juan Ignacio Gilardi | 14 November 1981 (aged 37) | 170 | (Argentina) San Fernando |
| 5 | DF | Pedro Ibarra (C) | 11 September 1985 (aged 33) | 263 | (Argentina) San Fernando |
| 9 | FW | Maico Casella | 5 June 1997 (aged 21) | 35 | (Argentina) San Fernando |
| 10 | FW | Matías Paredes | 1 February 1982 (aged 36) | 336 | (Argentina) Ducilo |
| 11 | FW | Joaquín Menini | 18 August 1991 (aged 27) | 102 | (Netherlands) Den Bosch |
| 12 | FW | Lucas Vila | 23 August 1986 (aged 32) | 216 | (Germany) Mannheimer HC |
| 16 | MF | Ignacio Ortiz | 26 July 1987 (aged 31) | 126 | (Argentina) Banco Provincia |
| 17 | DF | Juan Martín López | 27 May 1985 (aged 33) | 269 | (Argentina) Banco Provincia |
| 19 | FW | Tomás Bettaglio | 23 September 1991 (aged 27) | 10 | (Argentina) Banco Provincia |
| 21 | GK | Tomás Santiago | 15 June 1992 (aged 26) | 18 | (Belgium) Gantoise |
| 22 | DF | Matías Rey | 1 December 1984 (aged 33) | 179 | (Spain) Real Club de Polo |
| 23 | FW | Lucas Martínez | 17 November 1993 (aged 25) | 38 | (Netherlands) Oranje-Rood |
| 24 | DF | Nicolás Cicileo | 1 October 1993 (aged 25) | 18 | (Netherlands) Klein Zwitserland |
| 26 | MF | Agustín Mazzilli | 20 June 1989 (aged 29) | 197 | (Netherlands) Pinoké |
| 27 | MF | Lucas Rossi | 2 June 1985 (aged 33) | 206 | (Belgium) Beerschot |
| 30 | MF | Agustín Bugallo | 23 April 1995 (aged 23) | 41 | (Argentina) Mitre |

=== France ===
The squad was announced on 13 November 2018.

Head coach: (Netherlands) Jeroen Delmee

| No. | Pos. | Player | Date of birth (age) | Caps | Club |
|---|---|---|---|---|---|
| 1 | GK | Artur Thieffry | 15 September 1989 (aged 29) | 46 | (Belgium) Orée |
| 4 | FW | Pieter van Straaten | 23 October 1992 (aged 26) | 66 | (Belgium) Waterloo Ducks |
| 6 | | Tom Genestet | 4 May 1987 (aged 31) | 171 | (France) Saint Germain |
| 7 | MF | Hugo Genestet | 2 March 1992 (aged 26) | 146 | (Belgium) Daring |
| 9 | FW | Blaise Rogeau | 26 November 1994 (aged 24) | 43 | (France) Saint Germain |
| 10 | DF | Victor Lockwood | 29 March 1992 (aged 26) | 96 | (Belgium) Orée |
| 11 | | Charles Masson | 13 April 1992 (aged 26) | 71 | (Belgium) Orée |
| 13 | MF | Nicolas Dumont | 13 December 1991 (aged 26) | 42 | (Belgium) Waterloo Ducks |
| 14 | | Gaspard Baumgarten | 3 August 1992 (aged 26) | 112 | (Belgium) Léopold |
| 16 | MF | François Goyet | 4 November 1994 (aged 24) | 83 | (France) Saint Germain |
| 17 | | Cristoforo Peters-Deutz | 17 November 1995 (aged 23) | 85 | Racing Club de France |
| 18 | DF | Jean-Bapiste Forgues | 18 May 1992 (aged 26) | 123 | (Belgium) Léopold |
| 21 | FW | Etienne Tynevez | 13 February 1999 (aged 19) | 48 | (Belgium) Gantoise |
| 22 | DF | Victor Charlet (C) | 19 November 1993 (aged 25) | 101 | (Belgium) Waterloo Ducks |
| 24 | | Aristide Coisne | 27 September 1993 (aged 25) | 59 | (Belgium) Léopold |
| 27 | | Maximilien Branicki | 16 December 1997 (aged 20) | 19 | (Belgium) Orée |
| 28 | FW | Timothée Clément | 8 April 2000 (aged 18) | 6 | (France) Montrouge |
| 29 | GK | Corentin Saunier | 1 February 1994 (aged 24) | 32 | (Netherlands) Schaerweijde |

=== New Zealand ===
The squad was announced on 31 October 2018.

Head coach: Darren Smith

| No. | Pos. | Player | Date of birth (age) | Caps | Club |
|---|---|---|---|---|---|
| 2 | DF | Cory Bennett | 12 July 1991 (aged 27) | 75 | (New Zealand) North Harbour |
| 4 | DF | Dane Lett | 29 August 1990 (aged 28) | 38 | (New Zealand) Capital |
| 7 | MF | Nick Ross | 26 July 1990 (aged 28) | 94 | (New Zealand) Southern |
| 8 | GK | Richard Joyce | 30 July 1992 (aged 26) | 56 | (New Zealand) North Harbour |
| 13 | FW | Marcus Child | 2 March 1991 (aged 27) | 137 | (Netherlands) Pinoké |
| 14 | FW | Jared Panchia | 18 October 1993 (aged 25) | 101 | (New Zealand) Auckland |
| 15 | GK | George Enersen | 7 July 1991 (aged 27) | 43 | (New Zealand) Canterbury |
| 16 | DF | Aidan Sarikaya | 3 July 1996 (aged 22) | 23 | (New Zealand) Midlands |
| 17 | MF | Nic Woods | 26 August 1995 (aged 23) | 93 | (Belgium) Racing Bruxelles |
| 21 | DF | Kane Russell | 22 April 1992 (aged 26) | 129 | (Belgium) Léopold |
| 22 | DF | Blair Tarrant (C) | 11 May 1990 (aged 28) | 189 | (Netherlands) Rotterdam |
| 24 | MF | Arun Panchia | 22 April 1989 (aged 29) | 256 | (New Zealand) Auckland |
| 25 | MF | Shea McAleese | 7 August 1984 (aged 34) | 275 | (New Zealand) Central |
| 27 | FW | Stephen Jenness | 7 June 1990 (aged 28) | 218 | (Belgium) Herakles |
| 28 | FW | Dominic Newman | 7 November 1996 (aged 22) | 43 | (New Zealand) Canterbury |
| 29 | FW | Hugo Inglis | 18 January 1991 (aged 27) | 212 | (Belgium) Braxgata |
| 30 | MF | George Muir | 24 February 1994 (aged 24) | 110 | (New Zealand) North Harbour |
| 31 | MF | Hayden Philips | 6 February 1998 (aged 20) | 68 | (New Zealand) Central |

=== Spain ===
The squad was announced on 4 November 2018. Miquel Delàs withdrew injured after the game against Argentina and was replaced by Ricardo Sánchez on 1 December.

Head coach: (France) Frederic Soyez

| No. | Pos. | Player | Date of birth (age) | Caps | Club |
|---|---|---|---|---|---|
| 1 | GK | Quico Cortés (C) | 29 March 1983 (aged 35) | 268 | (Spain) Club Egara |
| 3 | DF | Sergi Enrique | 22 September 1987 (aged 31) | 280 | (Spain) Junior |
| 4 | DF | Ricardo Sánchez | 4 December 1992 (aged 25) | 51 | (Belgium) Gantoise |
| 5 | DF | Marc Serrahima | 25 April 1995 (aged 23) | 43 | (Spain) Junior |
| 6 | DF | Ignacio Rodríguez | 12 June 1996 (aged 22) | 19 | (Spain) Club de Campo |
| 7 | DF | Miquel Delas^{INJ} | 13 April 1984 (aged 34) | 217 | (Spain) Barcelona |
| 8 | FW | Enrique González | 29 April 1996 (aged 22) | 73 | (Spain) Club de Campo |
| 9 | FW | Álvaro Iglesias | 1 March 1993 (aged 25) | 94 | (Spain) Club de Campo |
| 10 | MF | Marc Salles | 6 May 1987 (aged 31) | 198 | (Spain) Club de Campo |
| 14 | DF | Ricardo Santana | 27 February 1993 (aged 25) | 95 | (Belgium) Leuven |
| 15 | FW | Diego Arana | 12 September 1988 (aged 30) | 37 | (Spain) Jolaseta |
| 17 | MF | Xavi Lleonart | 22 June 1990 (aged 28) | 173 | (Spain) Real Club de Polo |
| 18 | MF | Alejandro de Frutos | 29 September 1992 (aged 26) | 77 | (Spain) Club de Campo |
| 21 | MF | Viçens Ruiz | 30 October 1991 (aged 27) | 120 | (Spain) Club Egara |
| 22 | FW | Albert Béltran | 23 October 1993 (aged 25) | 61 | (Netherlands) Rotterdam |
| 23 | DF | Josep Romeu | 22 May 1990 (aged 28) | 92 | (Spain) Club Egara |
| 24 | GK | Mario Garín | 26 April 1992 (aged 26) | 39 | (Spain) Real Club de Polo |
| 25 | FW | Pau Quemada | 4 September 1983 (aged 35) | 233 | (Spain) Club Egara |
| 27 | FW | Marc Boltó | 21 November 1995 (aged 23) | 28 | (Spain) Atlètic Terrassa |

== Pool B ==
=== Australia ===
The squad was announced on 2 November 2018.

Head coach: Colin Batch

| No. | Pos. | Player | Date of birth (age) | Caps | Club |
|---|---|---|---|---|---|
| 2 | MF | Tom Craig | 3 September 1995 (aged 23) | 70 | (Australia) NSW Waratahs |
| 3 | DF | Corey Weyer | 28 March 1996 (aged 22) | 19 | (Australia) QLD Blades |
| 4 | DF | Jake Harvie | 5 March 1998 (aged 20) | 39 | (Australia) WA Thundersticks |
| 6 | DF | Matthew Dawson | 27 April 1994 (aged 24) | 107 | (Australia) NSW Waratahs |
| 11 | MF | Eddie Ockenden (C) | 3 April 1987 (aged 31) | 332 | (Australia) Tassie Tigers |
| 12 | FW | Jacob Whetton | 15 June 1991 (aged 27) | 171 | (Australia) QLD Blades |
| 13 | FW | Blake Govers | 6 July 1996 (aged 22) | 71 | (Australia) NSW Waratahs |
| 16 | DF | Tim Howard | 23 June 1996 (aged 22) | 28 | (Australia) QLD Blades |
| 17 | MF | Aran Zalewski (C) | 21 March 1991 (aged 27) | 156 | (Australia) WA Thundersticks |
| 20 | DF | Matthew Swann | 16 May 1989 (aged 29) | 177 | (Australia) QLD Blades |
| 22 | MF | Flynn Ogilvie | 17 September 1993 (aged 25) | 80 | (Australia) NSW Waratahs |
| 23 | MF | Daniel Beale | 12 February 1993 (aged 25) | 145 | (Australia) QLD Blades |
| 24 | GK | Tyler Lovell | 23 May 1987 (aged 31) | 125 | (Australia) WA Thundersticks |
| 25 | FW | Trent Mitton | 26 November 1990 (aged 28) | 146 | (Australia) WA Thundersticks |
| 26 | FW | Dylan Wotherspoon | 9 April 1993 (aged 25) | 75 | (Australia) QLD Blades |
| 29 | FW | Timothy Brand | 29 November 1998 (aged 19) | 12 | (Australia) NSW Waratahs |
| 30 | GK | Andrew Charter | 30 March 1987 (aged 31) | 160 | (Australia) Canberra Lakers |
| 32 | DF | Jeremy Hayward | 3 March 1993 (aged 25) | 122 | (Australia) NT Stingers |

=== China ===
The squad was announced on 14 November 2018.

Head coach: (South Korea) Kim Sang-ryul

| No. | Pos. | Player | Date of birth (age) | Caps | Club |
|---|---|---|---|---|---|
| 1 | MF | Guo Xiaoping | 6 December 1992 (aged 25) | 56 | |
| 3 | GK | Ao Zhiwei | 1 October 1994 (aged 24) | 28 | |
| 5 | MF | Guan Quyang | 28 October 1996 (aged 22) | 5 | |
| 7 | FW | Ao Suozhu | 30 June 1994 (aged 24) | 22 | |
| 8 | FW | E Wenhui | 3 July 1993 (aged 25) | 38 | |
| 9 | DF | Ao Yang | 12 November 1992 (aged 26) | 35 | |
| 12 | DF | Meng Dihao | 19 October 1996 (aged 22) | 34 | |
| 16 | MF | Su Jun | 16 April 1991 (aged 27) | 13 | |
| 17 | | Meng Nan | 6 March 1999 (aged 19) | 0 | |
| 18 | FW | Su Wenlin | 23 October 1997 (aged 21) | 5 | |
| 20 | FW | Su Lixing | 9 July 1995 (aged 23) | 34 | |
| 21 | MF | Du Chen (C) | 3 April 1991 (aged 27) | 25 | |
| 22 | DF | Du Talake | 8 October 1990 (aged 28) | 56 | |
| 23 | MF | Guo Zixiang | 6 August 1994 (aged 24) | 39 | |
| 24 | FW | E Wenlong | 21 July 1995 (aged 23) | 18 | |
| 28 | GK | Wang Caiyu | 28 June 1997 (aged 21) | 1 | |
| 30 | DF | Ao Weibao | 29 September 1990 (aged 28) | 100 | |
| 32 | DF | Guo Jin | 21 April 1989 (aged 29) | 22 | |

=== England ===
The squad was announced on 13 November 2018. Sam Ward withdrew injured and was replaced by Liam Ansell on 22 November.

Head coach: Danny Kerry

| No. | Pos. | Player | Date of birth (age) | Caps | Club |
|---|---|---|---|---|---|
| 1 | GK | George Pinner (C) | 18 January 1987 (aged 31) | 162 | (England) Holcombe |
| 2 | GK | Harry Gibson | 25 March 1993 (aged 25) | 51 | (England) Surbiton |
| 3 | DF | Luke Taylor | 15 September 1994 (aged 24) | 20 | (England) Surbiton |
| 5 | MF | David Ames | 25 June 1989 (aged 29) | 56 | (England) Holcombe |
| 9 | MF | Harry Martin | 23 October 1992 (aged 26) | 194 | (England) Hampstead & Westminster |
| 11 | MF | Ian Sloan (C) | 19 November 1993 (aged 25) | 69 | (England) Wimbledon |
| 12 | DF | Mikey Hoare | 14 November 1985 (aged 33) | 139 | (England) Wimbledon |
| 14 | DF | Mark Gleghorne | 19 May 1985 (aged 33) | 150 | (England) Beeston |
| 15 | FW | Phil Roper (C) | 24 January 1992 (aged 26) | 105 | (England) Wimbledon |
| 16 | DF | Adam Dixon | 11 September 1986 (aged 32) | 232 | (England) Beeston |
| 17 | MF | Barry Middleton | 12 January 1984 (aged 34) | 425 | (England) Holcombe |
| 21 | FW | Liam Ansell | 12 November 1993 (aged 25) | 28 | (England) East Grinstead |
| 22 | FW | David Condon | 6 July 1991 (aged 27) | 153 | (England) East Grinstead |
| 25 | DF | Jack Waller | 28 January 1997 (aged 21) | 8 | (England) Wimbledon |
| 26 | MF | James Gall | 20 May 1995 (aged 23) | 41 | (England) Surbiton |
| 27 | DF | Liam Sanford | 14 March 1996 (aged 22) | 43 | (England) Reading |
| 31 | FW | Will Calnan | 17 April 1996 (aged 22) | 6 | (England) Hampstead & Westminster |
| 32 | MF | Zach Wallace | 29 September 1999 (aged 19) | 7 | (England) Surbiton |

=== Ireland ===
The squad was announced on 23 October 2018.

Head coach: (Netherlands) Alexander Cox

| No. | Pos. | Player | Date of birth (age) | Caps | Club |
|---|---|---|---|---|---|
| 1 | GK | David Harte (C) | 3 April 1988 (aged 30) | 212 | (Netherlands) Kampong |
| 4 | DF | Jonathan Bell | 19 June 1987 (aged 31) | 153 | (Ireland) Lisnagarvey |
| 5 | DF | Matthew Bell | 11 August 1993 (aged 25) | 90 | (Germany) Crefelder HTC |
| 8 | MF | Chris Cargo | 18 February 1986 (aged 32) | 187 | (England) Hampstead & Westminster |
| 9 | FW | Matthew Nelson | 14 April 1998 (aged 20) | 49 | (Ireland) Lisnagarvey |
| 10 | FW | Alan Sothern | 28 July 1987 (aged 31) | 184 | (Belgium) Gantoise |
| 12 | FW | Eugene Magee | 1 April 1986 (aged 32) | 274 | (Ireland) Banbridge |
| 15 | MF | Kirk Shimmins | 1 June 1994 (aged 24) | 103 | (Belgium) Dragons |
| 16 | MF | Shane O'Donoghue | 24 November 1992 (aged 26) | 162 | (Belgium) Dragons |
| 17 | MF | Sean Murray | 5 April 1997 (aged 21) | 51 | (Netherlands) Rotterdam |
| 20 | FW | Mitch Darling | 3 July 1988 (aged 30) | 180 | (Ireland) Three Rock Rovers |
| 22 | MF | Michael Robson | 18 April 1995 (aged 23) | 88 | (Germany) Crefelder HTC |
| 23 | GK | David Fitzgerald | 8 October 1986 (aged 32) | 52 | (Ireland) Monkstown |
| 25 | MF | Daragh Walsh | 27 August 1997 (aged 21) | 23 | (Ireland) Three Rock Rovers |
| 26 | DF | Paul Gleghorne | 11 April 1987 (aged 31) | 215 | (Germany) Crefelder HTC |
| 27 | DF | Conor Harte | 3 April 1988 (aged 30) | 227 | (Belgium) Racing Bruxelles |
| 29 | DF | Lee Cole | 21 February 1995 (aged 23) | 61 | (Belgium) Orée |
| 30 | DF | Stuart Loughrey | 20 February 1991 (aged 27) | 115 | (England) Reading |

== Pool C ==
=== Belgium ===
The squad was announced on 4 November 2018. Emmanuel Stockbroekx and John-John Dohmen withdrew injured after the game against India and were replaced by Antoine Kina on 3 December and Augustin Meurmans on 7 December.

Head coach: (New Zealand) Shane McLeod

| No. | Pos. | Player | Date of birth (age) | Caps | Club |
|---|---|---|---|---|---|
| 2 | GK | Loic Van Doren | 14 September 1996 (aged 22) | 12 | (Netherlands) Den Bosch |
| 4 | DF | Arthur Van Doren | 1 October 1994 (aged 24) | 145 | (Netherlands) Bloemendaal |
| 7 | MF | John-John Dohmen^{INJ} | 24 January 1988 (aged 30) | 366 | (Belgium) Waterloo Ducks |
| 8 | FW | Florent van Aubel | 25 September 1991 (aged 27) | 196 | (Belgium) Dragons |
| 9 | FW | Sébastien Dockier | 28 December 1989 (aged 28) | 166 | (Netherlands) Den Bosch |
| 10 | FW | Cédric Charlier | 27 November 1987 (aged 31) | 283 | (Belgium) Racing Bruxelles |
| 12 | DF | Gauthier Boccard | 26 August 1991 (aged 27) | 183 | (Belgium) Waterloo Ducks |
| 13 | FW | Nicolas De Kerpel | 23 April 1993 (aged 25) | 34 | (Belgium) Herakles |
| 14 | MF | Augustin Meurmans | 29 May 1997 (age 29) | 39 | (Belgium) Racing Bruxelles |
| 15 | DF | Emmanuel Stockbroekx^{INJ} | 23 December 1993 (aged 24) | 133 | (Netherlands) Bloemendaal |
| 16 | DF | Alexander Hendrickx | 6 August 1993 (aged 25) | 85 | (Netherlands) Pinoké |
| 17 | FW | Thomas Briels (C) | 23 August 1987 (aged 31) | 308 | (Netherlands) Oranje-Rood |
| 19 | MF | Félix Denayer | 31 January 1990 (aged 28) | 282 | (Belgium) Dragons |
| 21 | GK | Vincent Vanasch | 21 December 1987 (aged 30) | 201 | (Belgium) Waterloo Ducks |
| 22 | MF | Simon Gougnard | 17 January 1991 (aged 27) | 244 | (Belgium) Racing Bruxelles |
| 23 | DF | Arthur De Sloover | 3 May 1997 (aged 21) | 46 | (Belgium) Beerschot |
| 24 | FW | Antoine Kina | 13 February 1996 (aged 22) | 29 | (Belgium) Gantoise |
| 25 | DF | Loïck Luypaert | 19 August 1991 (aged 27) | 204 | (Belgium) Braxgata |
| 26 | MF | Victor Wegnez | 25 December 1995 (aged 22) | 52 | (Belgium) Racing Bruxelles |
| 27 | FW | Tom Boon | 25 January 1990 (aged 28) | 259 | (Belgium) Racing Bruxelles |

=== Canada ===
The squad was announced on 2 November 2018. Brandon Pereira withdrew injured after the game against South Africa and was replaced by Floris van Son on 4 December.

Head coach: Paul Bundy

| No. | Pos. | Player | Date of birth (age) | Caps | Club |
|---|---|---|---|---|---|
| 1 | FW | Floris van Son | 5 February 1992 (aged 26) | 26 | (Netherlands) HIC |
| 3 | DF | Brandon Pereira^{INJ} | 30 April 1996 (aged 22) | 39 | (Canada) United Brothers |
| 4 | DF | Scott Tupper (C) | 16 December 1986 (aged 31) | 286 | (Canada) West Vancouver |
| 7 | MF | Gabriel Ho-Garcia | 19 May 1993 (aged 25) | 121 | (Germany) Mannheimer HC |
| 8 | FW | Oliver Scholfield | 11 September 1993 (aged 25) | 37 | (Canada) Vancouver Hawks |
| 9 | MF | Richard Hildreth | 3 June 1984 (aged 34) | 184 | (Canada) Vancouver Hawks |
| 10 | FW | Keegan Pereira | 8 September 1991 (aged 27) | 148 | (Germany) Uhlenhorst Mülheim |
| 11 | DF | Balraj Panesar | 16 March 1996 (aged 22) | 47 | (Canada) UBC Thunderbirds |
| 16 | DF | Gordon Johnston | 30 January 1993 (aged 25) | 145 | (Canada) Vancouver Hawks |
| 17 | FW | Brenden Bissett | 28 January 1993 (aged 25) | 104 | (Netherlands) Nijmegen |
| 18 | MF | James Wallace | 14 September 1999 (aged 19) | 15 | (Canada) UBC Thunderbirds |
| 19 | MF | Mark Pearson | 18 June 1987 (aged 31) | 248 | (Canada) West Vancouver |
| 21 | FW | Matthew Sarmento | 23 June 1991 (aged 27) | 105 | (Belgium) Leuven |
| 22 | DF | John Smythe | 31 August 1989 (aged 29) | 86 | (Canada) Vancouver Hawks |
| 23 | FW | Iain Smythe | 2 June 1985 (aged 33) | 175 | (Canada) Vancouver Hawks |
| 24 | FW | James Kirkpatrick | 29 March 1991 (aged 27) | 65 | (Canada) West Vancouver |
| 27 | MF | Sukhi Panesar | 26 December 1993 (aged 24) | 123 | (Germany) Uhlenhorst Mülheim |
| 30 | GK | David Carter | 4 November 1981 (aged 37) | 172 | (Canada) United Brothers |
| 31 | GK | Antoni Kindler | 16 April 1988 (aged 30) | 87 | (Canada) West Vancouver |

=== India ===
The squad was announced on 8 November 2018.

Head coach: Harendra Singh

| No. | Pos. | Player | Date of birth (age) | Caps | Club |
|---|---|---|---|---|---|
| 1 | DF | Harmanpreet Singh | 6 January 1996 (aged 22) | 90 | (India) Hockey Punjab |
| 2 | FW | Dilpreet Singh | 12 November 1999 (aged 19) | 36 | (India) Hockey Punjab |
| 5 | DF | Kothajit Khadangbam | 17 August 1992 (aged 26) | 184 | (India) Manipur Hockey |
| 6 | DF | Surender Kumar | 23 November 1993 (aged 25) | 103 | (India) Hockey Haryana |
| 7 | MF | Manpreet Singh (C) | 26 June 1992 (aged 26) | 238 | (India) Hockey Punjab |
| 8 | DF | Hardik Singh | 23 September 1998 (aged 20) | 6 | (India) Hockey Punjab |
| 10 | FW | Simranjeet Singh | 27 December 1996 (aged 21) | 24 | (India) Hockey Punjab |
| 11 | FW | Mandeep Singh | 25 January 1995 (aged 23) | 125 | (India) Hockey Punjab |
| 14 | FW | Lalit Upadhyay | 1 December 1993 (aged 24) | 89 | Air India Sports Promotion Board |
| 16 | GK | P. R. Sreejesh | 8 May 1988 (aged 30) | 204 | (India) Kerala Hockey |
| 17 | MF | Sumit | 20 December 1996 (aged 21) | 49 | (India) Hockey Haryana |
| 18 | MF | Nilakanta Sharma | 2 May 1995 (aged 23) | 25 | (India) Madhya Pradesh Hockey Academy |
| 19 | GK | Krishan Pathak | 24 April 1997 (aged 21) | 20 | (India) Hockey Punjab |
| 22 | DF | Varun Kumar | 25 July 1995 (aged 23) | 59 | (India) Hockey Punjab |
| 26 | DF | Birendra Lakra | 3 February 1990 (aged 28) | 168 | (India) Hockey Odisha |
| 27 | FW | Akashdeep Singh | 2 December 1994 (aged 23) | 174 | (India) Hockey Punjab |
| 29 | MF | Chinglensana Kangujam | 2 December 1991 (aged 26) | 199 | (India) Railways Sports Promotion Board |
| 30 | DF | Amit Rohidas | 10 May 1993 (aged 25) | 69 | (India) Hockey Odisha |

=== South Africa ===
The squad was announced on 7 October 2018.

Head coach: (England) Mark Hopkins

| No. | Pos. | Player | Date of birth (age) | Caps | Club |
|---|---|---|---|---|---|
| 3 | | Tyson Dlungwana | 18 February 1997 (aged 21) | 22 | (South Africa) Garden Route Gazelles |
| 5 | DF | Austin Smith | 20 May 1985 (aged 33) | 162 | (Netherlands) Den Bosch |
| 7 | MF | Tim Drummond (C) | 5 March 1988 (aged 30) | 131 | (Netherlands) Klein Zwitserland |
| 8 | | Peabo Lembethe | 13 January 1996 (aged 22) | 4 | (South Africa) Maropeng Cavemen |
| 9 | | Julian Hykes | 6 October 1982 (aged 36) | 126 | (South Africa) Addo Elephants |
| 10 | | Thomas Hammond | 18 September 1984 (aged 34) | 25 | (South Africa) Maropeng Cavemen |
| 11 | FW | Keenan Horne | 17 June 1992 (aged 26) | 38 | (England) Brooklands |
| 12 | FW | Dayaan Cassiem | 1 December 1998 (aged 19) | 21 | (Germany) Gladbacher HTC |
| 14 | DF | Rhett Halkett | 12 April 1986 (aged 32) | 152 | (Germany) UHC Hamburg |
| 15 | FW | Richard Pautz | 25 September 1991 (aged 27) | 16 | (Ireland) Three Rock Rovers |
| 17 | MF | Taylor Dart | 28 August 1992 (aged 26) | 22 | (South Africa) Garden Route Gazelles |
| 18 | | Taine Paton | 4 January 1989 (aged 29) | 103 | (Belgium) Antwerp |
| 19 | DF | Mohamed Mea | 23 April 1992 (aged 26) | 18 | (England) Holcombe |
| 21 | DF | Jethro Eustice | 1 November 1989 (aged 29) | 99 | (South Africa) Drakensberg Dragons |
| 23 | GK | Rassie Pieterse | 20 August 1983 (aged 35) | 137 | (South Africa) Maropeng Cavemen |
| 24 | MF | Nicholas Spooner | 28 August 1991 (aged 27) | 5 | (Germany) Harvestehude |
| 27 | FW | Nqobile Ntuli | 15 January 1996 (aged 22) | 30 | (South Africa) Drakensberg Dragons |
| 32 | GK | Gowan Jones | 24 June 1989 (aged 29) | 46 | (South Africa) Drakensberg Dragons |

== Pool D ==
=== Germany ===
The squad was announced on 4 November 2018. Mark Appel withdrew injured and was replaced by Victor Aly on 9 November. Benedikt Fürk withdrew injured after the game against Malaysia and was replaced by Julius Meyer on 12 December.

Head coach: Stefan Kermas

| No. | Pos. | Player | Date of birth (age) | Caps | Club |
|---|---|---|---|---|---|
| 2 | DF | Mathias Müller | 3 April 1992 (aged 26) | 85 | (Germany) Hamburger Polo Club |
| 3 | FW | Mats Grambusch | 4 November 1992 (aged 26) | 123 | (Germany) Rot-Weiss Köln |
| 4 | DF | Lukas Windfeder | 11 May 1995 (aged 23) | 88 | (Germany) Uhlenhorst Mülheim |
| 6 | DF | Martin Häner (C) | 27 August 1988 (aged 30) | 218 | (Germany) Berliner HC |
| 8 | DF | Julius Meyer | 21 April 1995 (aged 23) | 41 | (Germany) Uhlenhorst Mülheim |
| 9 | FW | Niklas Wellen | 14 December 1994 (aged 23) | 102 | (Germany) Crefelder HTC |
| 10 | MF | Dan Nguyen Luong | 8 December 1991 (aged 26) | 46 | (Germany) Mannheimer HC |
| 12 | FW | Timm Herzbruch | 7 June 1997 (aged 21) | 54 | (Germany) Uhlenhorst Mülheim |
| 13 | DF | Tobias Hauke | 11 September 1987 (aged 31) | 297 | (Germany) Harvestehude |
| 15 | DF | Tom Grambusch | 4 August 1995 (aged 23) | 47 | (Germany) Rot-Weiss Köln |
| 16 | FW | Dieter Linnekogel | 15 July 1992 (aged 26) | 49 | (Germany) Club an der Alster |
| 17 | FW | Christopher Rühr | 19 December 1993 (aged 24) | 117 | (Germany) Rot-Weiss Köln |
| 18 | DF | Ferdinand Weinke | 26 January 1995 (aged 23) | 36 | (Germany) Uhlenhorst Mülheim |
| 21 | GK | Tobias Walter | 16 February 1990 (aged 28) | 41 | (Belgium) Dragons |
| 22 | FW | Marco Miltkau | 18 August 1990 (aged 28) | 79 | (Germany) Rot-Weiss Köln |
| 23 | FW | Florian Fuchs | 10 November 1991 (aged 27) | 187 | (Netherlands) Bloemendaal |
| 24 | MF | Benedikt Fürk^{INJ} | 20 October 1988 (aged 30) | 146 | (Germany) Uhlenhorst Mülheim |
| 29 | DF | Johannes Große | 7 January 1997 (aged 21) | 23 | (Germany) Rot-Weiss Köln |
| 30 | GK | Victor Aly | 2 June 1994 (aged 24) | 3 | (Germany) Rot-Weiss Köln |

=== Malaysia ===
The squad was announced on 12 November 2018.

Head coach: (Netherlands) Roelant Oltmans

| No. | Pos. | Player | Date of birth (age) | Caps | Club |
|---|---|---|---|---|---|
| 3 | FW | Norsyafiq Sumantri | 17 June 1996 (aged 22) | 35 | (Malaysia) Tenaga Nasional Berhad |
| 4 | | Ramadan Rosli | 1 April 1991 (aged 27) | 84 | (Malaysia) Tenaga Nasional Berhad |
| 6 | MF | Marhan Jalil | 5 March 1990 (aged 28) | 233 | (Malaysia) UniKL |
| 7 | MF | Fitri Saari | 4 March 1993 (aged 25) | 134 | (Malaysia) Terengganu |
| 9 | MF | Joel van Huizen | 11 November 1992 (aged 26) | 74 | (Malaysia) UniKL |
| 10 | FW | Faizal Saari | 13 January 1991 (aged 27) | 223 | (Malaysia) Terengganu |
| 11 | | Syed Cholan | 12 May 1995 (aged 23) | 61 | (Malaysia) Tenaga Nasional Berhad |
| 12 | DF | Sukri Mutalib (C) | 24 February 1986 (aged 32) | 311 | (Malaysia) Kuala Lumpur |
| 13 | FW | Firhan Ashaari | 9 March 1993 (aged 25) | 145 | (Malaysia) Tenaga Nasional Berhad |
| 15 | MF | Nabil Fiqri | 14 April 1987 (aged 31) | 230 | (Malaysia) Kuala Lumpur |
| 16 | GK | Kumar Subramaniam | 26 November 1979 (aged 39) | 307 | |
| 17 | DF | Razie Rahim | 25 August 1987 (aged 31) | 255 | (Malaysia) Kuala Lumpur |
| 18 | | Faiz Jali | 18 February 1992 (aged 26) | 136 | (Malaysia) Tenaga Nasional Berhad |
| 19 | | Azri Hassan | 20 February 1992 (aged 26) | 103 | (Malaysia) Kuala Lumpur |
| 20 | MF | Azuan Hasan | 16 February 1994 (aged 24) | 119 | (Malaysia) Kuala Lumpur |
| 23 | FW | Tengku Ahmad Tajuddin | 5 January 1986 (aged 32) | 271 | (Malaysia) Tenaga Nasional Berhad |
| 24 | FW | Aiman Rozemi | 19 July 1996 (aged 22) | 76 | (Malaysia) Tenaga Nasional Berhad |
| 29 | GK | Hairi Rahman | 19 January 1990 (aged 28) | 36 | (Malaysia) Tenaga Nasional Berhad |

=== Netherlands ===
The squad was announced on 26 October 2018. Floris Wortelboer withdrew injured and was replaced by Jorrit Croon on 30 October. Sander de Wijn withdrew injured after the game against Canada and was replaced by Joep de Mol on 12 December.

Head coach: (Argentina) Maximiliano Caldas

| No. | Pos. | Player | Date of birth (age) | Caps | Club |
|---|---|---|---|---|---|
| 2 | FW | Jeroen Hertzberger | 24 February 1989 (aged 29) | 213 | (Netherlands) Rotterdam |
| 4 | DF | Lars Balk | 26 February 1996 (aged 22) | 27 | (Netherlands) Kampong |
| 5 | FW | Thijs van Dam | 5 January 1997 (aged 21) | 33 | (Netherlands) Rotterdam |
| 6 | MF | Jonas de Geus | 29 April 1998 (aged 20) | 41 | (Netherlands) Almere |
| 7 | MF | Jorrit Croon | 9 August 1998 (aged 20) | 56 | (Netherlands) Bloemendaal |
| 8 | MF | Billy Bakker (C) | 23 November 1988 (aged 30) | 178 | (Netherlands) Amsterdam |
| 9 | MF | Seve van Ass | 10 April 1992 (aged 26) | 144 | (Netherlands) HGC |
| 10 | MF | Valentin Verga | 7 October 1989 (aged 29) | 180 | (Netherlands) Amsterdam |
| 11 | DF | Glenn Schuurman | 16 April 1991 (aged 27) | 107 | (Netherlands) Bloemendaal |
| 12 | DF | Sander de Wijn^{INJ} | 2 May 1990 (aged 28) | 124 | (Netherlands) Kampong |
| 13 | DF | Sander Baart | 30 April 1988 (aged 30) | 161 | (Belgium) Braxgata |
| 14 | MF | Robbert Kemperman | 24 June 1990 (aged 28) | 199 | (Netherlands) Kampong |
| 16 | FW | Mirco Pruyser | 11 August 1989 (aged 29) | 86 | (Netherlands) Amsterdam |
| 19 | FW | Bob de Voogd | 16 September 1988 (aged 30) | 126 | (Netherlands) Oranje-Rood |
| 22 | GK | Sam van der Ven | 5 September 1989 (aged 29) | 33 | (Netherlands) HGC |
| 23 | DF | Joep de Mol | 10 December 1995 (aged 22) | 44 | (Netherlands) Oranje-Rood |
| 25 | FW | Thierry Brinkman | 19 March 1995 (aged 23) | 63 | (Netherlands) Bloemendaal |
| 26 | GK | Pirmin Blaak | 8 March 1988 (aged 30) | 67 | (Netherlands) Oranje-Rood |
| 30 | DF | Mink van der Weerden | 19 October 1988 (aged 30) | 134 | (Netherlands) Oranje-Rood |

=== Pakistan ===
The squad was announced on 14 November 2018. Muhammad Rizwan Sr. withdrew injured after the game against Malaysia and was replaced by Arslan Qadir on 8 December.

Head coach: Tauqeer Dar

| No. | Pos. | Player | Date of birth (age) | Caps | Club |
|---|---|---|---|---|---|
| 1 | GK | Imran Butt | 16 July 1988 (aged 30) | 138 | (Pakistan) PIA |
| 3 | DF | Mubashar Ali | 6 July 1997 (aged 21) | 34 | (Pakistan) SSGC |
| 5 | MF | Toseeq Arshad | 5 February 1992 (aged 26) | 114 | (Pakistan) WAPDA |
| 6 | DF | Rashid Mehmood | 15 August 1987 (aged 31) | 134 | (Netherlands) Oranje-Rood |
| 7 | FW | Muhammad Irfan Jr. | 2 December 1988 (aged 29) | 57 | (Pakistan) WAPDA |
| 8 | DF | Muhammad Irfan | 1 April 1990 (aged 28) | 208 | (Pakistan) PIA |
| 10 | MF | Ali Shan | 25 September 1993 (aged 25) | 131 | (Pakistan) SSGC |
| 11 | MF | Muhammad Rizwan Sr.^{INJ} | 31 December 1989 (aged 28) | 154 | (Netherlands) Oranje-Rood |
| 12 | GK | Mazhar Abbas | 5 June 1993 (aged 25) | 43 | (Pakistan) NBP |
| 13 | DF | Aleem Bilal | 1 November 1992 (aged 26) | 59 | (Pakistan) WAPDA |
| 14 | MF | Muhammad Umar Bhutta | 24 December 1992 (aged 25) | 163 | (Pakistan) WAPDA |
| 16 | DF | Ammad Butt (C) | 13 January 1996 (aged 22) | 115 | (Pakistan) NBP |
| 17 | FW | Muhammad Zubair | 12 October 1988 (aged 30) | 131 | (Pakistan) PIA |
| 18 | FW | Muhammad Atiq | 5 March 1997 (aged 21) | 34 | (Pakistan) NBP |
| 20 | DF | Faisal Qadir | 17 October 1988 (aged 30) | 80 | (Pakistan) NBP |
| 21 | DF | Tasawar Abbas | 1 June 1992 (aged 26) | 104 | (Pakistan) WAPDA |
| 22 | FW | Arslan Qadir | 2 November 1990 (aged 28) | 96 | (Pakistan) NBP |
| 23 | FW | Ajaz Ahmad | 13 June 1992 (aged 26) | 67 | (Pakistan) WAPDA |
| 27 | FW | Abu Mahmood | 10 February 1998 (aged 20) | 59 | (Pakistan) NBP |
