= 2014–15 Men's FIH Hockey World League Semifinals =

Field hockey tournament

Tournament details
- Dates: 3 June – 5 July 2015
- Teams: 20 (from 5 confederations)
- Venue: 2 (in 2 host cities)

Tournament statistics
- Matches played: 66
- Goals scored: 299 (4.53 per match)
- Top scorer: (Australia) Blake Govers (7 goals)
- Best player: (Belgium) John-John Dohmen (Canada) David Carter

The 2014–15 Men's FIH Hockey World League Semifinals took place in June and July 2015. A total of 20 teams competing in 2 events took part in this round of the tournament playing for 7 berths in the Final, played between 5–13 December 2015 in Raipur, India.

This round also served as a qualifier for the 2016 Summer Olympics as the 6 highest placed teams apart from the host nation and the five continental champions qualify.

== Qualification ==
11 teams ranked between 1st and 11th in the FIH World Rankings current at the time of seeking entries for the competition qualified automatically, in addition to 9 teams qualified from Round 2. The following twenty teams, shown with final pre-tournament rankings, competed in this round of the tournament.

Dates	Event	Location	Quotas	Qualifier(s)
	Ranked 1st to 11th in the FIH World Rankings		11	Germany (3); Australia (1); Netherlands (2); Great Britain (4); Pakistan (10); New Zealand (7); Spain (11); South Korea (8); Belgium (5); Argentina (6); India (9)
17–25 January 2015	2014–15 FIH Hockey World League Round 2	Singapore	3	Japan (16); Malaysia (12); Poland (17)
28 February – 8 March 2015	2014–15 FIH Hockey World League Round 2	San Diego, United States	3	Ireland (15); Austria (22); Canada (14)
7–15 March 2015	2014–15 FIH Hockey World League Round 2	Cape Town, South Africa	3	France (18); China (28); Egypt (21)
Total			20	

== Buenos Aires ==

Tournament details
- Host country: Argentina
- City: Buenos Aires
- Dates: 3–14 June 2015
- Teams: 10
- Venue: CeNARD

Tournament statistics
- Matches played: 33
- Goals scored: 140 (4.24 per match)
- Top scorer(s): (Germany) Christopher Rühr (Spain) Pau Quemada (6 goals)
- Best player: (Canada) David Carter

All times are Argentina Time (UTC−03:00)

=== Umpires ===
Below are the 11 umpires appointed by the International Hockey Federation:

- Bruce Bale (GBR)
- Murray Grime (AUS)
- Kim Hong-lae (KOR)
- Gabriel Labate (ARG)
- Lim Hong Zhen (SIN)
- Jakub Mejzlik (CZE)
- Deon Nel (RSA)
- Haider Rasool (PAK)
- Maximiliano Scala (ARG)
- Simon Taylor (NZL)
- Daniel López Ramos (URU)

=== First round ===
==== Pool A ====
Pos	Team	Pld	W	D	L	GF	GA	GD	Pts	Qualification
1	Netherlands	4	3	1	0	14	4	+10	10	Advanced to quarterfinals
2	New Zealand	4	2	2	0	10	6	+4	8	Advanced to quarterfinals
3	South Korea	4	2	1	1	16	14	+2	7	Advanced to quarterfinals
4	Japan	4	1	0	3	6	9	−3	3	Advanced to quarterfinals
5	Egypt	4	0	0	4	4	17	−13	0	

Source: FIH.ch
Rules for classification: 1) points; 2) goal difference; 3) goals scored; 4) head-to-head result.

3 June 2015
14:00

New Zealand	4–1	Egypt
Russell 27'; Child 41'; Inglis 42'; Haig 60'	Report	Mamdouh 57'

Umpires:
Lim Hong Zhen (SIN)
Murray Grime (AUS)

3 June 2015
16:00

South Korea	4–2	Japan
Lee N. 47', 50'; Jang 48'; Hyun 53'	Report	Kitazato 37'; Sakamoto 40'

Umpires:
Deon Nel (RSA)
Haider Rasool (PAK)

4 June 2015
16:00

New Zealand	2–1	Japan
Edwards 4'; Child 15'	Report	Kitazato 59'

Umpires:
Jakub Mejzlík (CZE)
Bruce Bale (GBR)

4 June 2015
16:00

Netherlands	4–0	Egypt
De Voogd 26', 58'; Van Ass 33'; Van der Weerden 51'	Report

Umpires:
Lim Hong Zhen (SIN)
Gabriel Labate (ARG)

6 June 2015
12:00

South Korea	2–6	Netherlands
Lee N. 50'; Nam 50'	Report	Hofman 15'; Van der Weerden 22'; Hertzberger 31'; Bakker 45'; De Voogd 60'; Kemperman 60'

Umpires:
Murray Grime (AUS)
Daniel López Ramos (URU)

6 June 2015
14:00

Japan	2–0	Egypt
Mitani 41'; Kayukawa 47'	Report

Umpires:
Haider Rasool (PAK)
Maximiliano Scala (ARG)

7 June 2015
12:00

Egypt	3–7	South Korea
Elhady 8'; Essam 26'; H. Atef 34'	Report	Nam 8', 44'; Jang 13'; Lee N. 46'; Lee J. 50'; Kang 57'; You 58'

Umpires:
Gabriel Labate (ARG)
Haider Rasool (PAK)

7 June 2015
14:00

New Zealand	1–1	Netherlands
Haig 60'	Report	Hertzberger 21'

Umpires:
Murray Grime (AUS)
Jakub Mejzlík (CZE)

9 June 2015
16:00

Netherlands	3–1	Japan
Bakker 1', 42'; Van der Weerden 49'	Report	Tachibana 6'

Umpires:
Maximiliano Scala (ARG)
Lim Hong Zhen (SIN)

9 June 2015
18:00

South Korea	3–3	New Zealand
Oh 4'; Kim Y. 12'; Nam 32'	Report	Inglis 17'; Burrows 34'; Child 45'

Umpires:
Jakub Mejzlík (CZE)
Bruce Bale (GBR)

==== Pool B ====
Pos	Team	Pld	W	D	L	GF	GA	GD	Pts	Qualification
1	Argentina	4	4	0	0	10	4	+6	12	Advanced to quarterfinals
2	Germany	4	3	0	1	21	5	+16	9	Advanced to quarterfinals
3	Canada	4	2	0	2	7	13	−6	6	Advanced to quarterfinals
4	Spain	4	1	0	3	7	9	−2	3	Advanced to quarterfinals
5	Austria	4	0	0	4	1	15	−14	0	

Source: FIH.ch
Rules for classification: 1) points; 2) goal difference; 3) goals scored; 4) head-to-head result.

3 June 2015
18:00

Spain	2–3	Canada
Quemada 43'; Beltrán 52'	Report	Johnston 6'; Kirkpatrick 39'; Noronha 44'

Umpires:
Simon Taylor (NZL)
Jakub Mejzlík (CZE)

3 June 2015
20:00

Argentina	3–0	Austria
Ortíz 22'; Vila 45'; Della Torre 59'	Report

Umpires:
Daniel López Ramos (URU)
Kim Hong-lae (KOR)

4 June 2015
18:00

Canada	3–0	Austria
Pearson 29'; Noronha 44'; Sarmento 59'	Report

Umpires:
Maximiliano Scala (ARG)
Murray Grime (AUS)

4 June 2015
20:00

Spain	1–4	Germany
Iglesias 56'	Report	Fürste 13'; Butt 36'; Grambusch 38'; Rühr 44'

Umpires:
Simon Taylor (NZL)
Deon Nel (RSA)

6 June 2015
16:00

Germany	5–0	Austria
Wellen 11'; Deecke 40'; Zeller 50'; Rühr 55'; Grambusch 59'	Report

Umpires:
Kim Hong-lae (KOR)
Deon Nel (RSA)

6 June 2015
18:00

Argentina	2–1	Canada
Gilardi 20'; Peillat 45'	Report	Panesar 29'

Umpires:
Simon Taylor (NZL)
Jakub Mejzlík (CZE)

7 June 2015
16:00

Austria	1–4	Spain
Uher 26'	Report	Quemada 6', 43'; Mir 17'; Lleonart 29'

Umpires:
Deon Nel (RSA)
Lim Hong Zhen (SIN)

7 June 2015
18:00

Argentina	4–3	Germany
P. Ibarra 8'; Gilardi 13'; Peillat 53', 58'	Report	Fuchs 21'; Zeller 24'; Hauke 54'

Umpires:
Simon Taylor (NZL)
Kim Hong-lae (KOR)

9 June 2015
14:00

Germany	9–0	Canada
Fuchs 3', 4'; Rühr 6', 45'; Wellen 7'; Grambusch 29'; Fürste 36'; Hauke 38'; Zeller 49'	Report

Umpires:
Deon Nel (RSA)
Murray Grime (AUS)

9 June 2015
20:00

Spain	0–1	Argentina
	Report	Callioni 57'

Umpires:
Simon Taylor (NZL)
Haider Rasool (PAK)

=== Second round ===
Quarter-finals
11 June 2015
Netherlands	3
Spain	1
11 June 2015
Germany	2
South Korea	0
11 June 2015
New Zealand	0 (7)
Canada (p.s.o)	0 (8)
11 June 2015
Argentina	2
Japan	1

Semi-finals
13 June 2015
Netherlands	1
Germany	2
13 June 2015
Canada	0
Argentina	3

Final
14 June 2015
Germany	4
Argentina	1
Third place
14 June 2015
Netherlands	6
Canada	1

==== Quarterfinals ====
11 June 2015
12:30

Germany	2–0	South Korea
Wellen 38'; Fürste 45'	Report

Umpires:
Murray Grime (AUS)
Jakub Mejzlík (CZE)

11 June 2015
15:00

Netherlands	3–1	Spain
Van der Schoot 7'; Van der Weerden 28'; Verga 58'	Report	Quemada 46'

Umpires:
Simon Taylor (NZL)
Gabriel Labate (ARG)

11 June 2015
17:30

New Zealand	0–0	Canada
	Report
Penalties
Inglis (penalty shoot-out scored); Hilton (penalty shoot-out scored); Edwards (penalty shoot-out scored); Archibald (penalty shoot-out missed); Child (penalty shoot-out missed) —— Inglis (penalty shoot-out scored); Edwards (penalty shoot-out scored); Hilton (penalty shoot-out missed); Archibald (penalty shoot-out missed); Child (penalty shoot-out missed); Inglis (penalty shoot-out missed); Edwards (penalty shoot-out scored); Hilton (penalty shoot-out scored); Archibald (penalty shoot-out missed)	7–8	(penalty shoot-out scored) Pearson; (penalty shoot-out missed) Tupper; (penalty shoot-out missed) Froese; (penalty shoot-out scored) Panesar; (penalty shoot-out scored) Johnston —— (penalty shoot-out scored) Pearson; (penalty shoot-out scored) Johnston; (penalty shoot-out missed) Panesar; (penalty shoot-out missed) Froese; (penalty shoot-out missed) Tupper; (penalty shoot-out missed) Pearson; (penalty shoot-out scored) Johnston; (penalty shoot-out scored) Panesar; (penalty shoot-out scored) Froese

Umpires:
Kim Hong-lae (KOR)
Lim Hong Zhen (SIN)

11 June 2015
20:00

Argentina	2–1	Japan
Paredes 7'; Peillat 52'	Report	Tachibana 53'

Umpires:
Deon Nel (RSA)
Bruce Bale (GBR)

==== Ninth and tenth place ====
11 June 2015
10:00

Egypt	2–2	Austria
H. Atef 2', 57'	Report	Körper 6'; Bele 30'
Penalties
Mansour (penalty shoot-out scored); El-Naggar (penalty shoot-out scored); Sayed (penalty shoot-out scored); Elhady (penalty shoot-out scored); K. Atef (penalty shoot-out missed)	4–3	(penalty shoot-out scored) Uher; (penalty shoot-out missed) Eitenberger; (penalty shoot-out scored) Körper; (penalty shoot-out missed) Stanzl; (penalty shoot-out scored) Rudofsky

Umpires:
Daniel López Ramos (URU)
Maximiliano Scala (ARG)

==== Fifth to eighth place classification ====
Crossover
13 June 2015
Spain (p.s.o)	2 (4)
South Korea	2 (2)
13 June 2015
New Zealand	4
Japan	1

Fifth place match
14 June 2015
Spain	3
New Zealand	1
Seventh place match
14 June 2015
South Korea	1
Japan	0

===== Crossover =====
13 June 2015
10:30

Spain	2–2	South Korea
Quemada 48', 60'	Report	Oh 21'; Lee N. 51'
Penalties
Piera (penalty shoot-out scored); Salles (penalty shoot-out scored); Pérez-Pla (penalty shoot-out scored); Lleonart (penalty shoot-out scored)	4–2	(penalty shoot-out scored) You; (penalty shoot-out scored) Lee N. (penalty shoot-out missed) Lee D. (penalty shoot-out missed) Lee J.

Umpires:
Murray Grime (AUS)
Maximiliano Scala (ARG)

13 June 2015
13:00

New Zealand	4–1	Japan
Jenness 16'; McAleese 46'; Hayward 49'; Edwards 60'	Report	Mitani 58'

Umpires:
Jakub Mejzlík (CZE)
Haider Rasool (PAK)

===== Seventh and eighth place =====
14 June 2015
10:30

South Korea	1–0	Japan
You 20'	Report

Umpires:
Daniel López Ramos (URU)
Gabriel Labate (ARG)

===== Fifth and sixth place =====
14 June 2015
13:00

Spain	3–1	New Zealand
Beltrán 26'; Dabanch 31'; Mir 56'	Report	Child 13'

Umpires:
Murray Grime (AUS)
Jakub Mejzlík (CZE)

==== First to fourth place classification ====
===== Semifinals =====
13 June 2015
15:30

Canada	0–3	Argentina
	Report	Peillat 14'; Gilardi 23'; Ortíz 42'

Umpires:
Kim Hong-lae (KOR)
Simon Taylor (NZL)

13 June 2015
18:00

Netherlands	1–2	Germany
Hertzberger 44'	Report	Fuchs 45'; Deecke 52'

Umpires:
Deon Nel (RSA)
Lim Hong Zhen (SIN)

===== Third and fourth place =====
14 June 2015
15:30

Netherlands	6–0	Canada
Jonker 2', 53'; Bakker 17'; Van der Weerden 26'; Kemperman 34'; Van der Horst 40'	Report

Umpires:
Simon Taylor (NZL)
Haider Rasool (PAK)

===== Final =====
14 June 2015
18:00

Germany	4–1	Argentina
Rühr 4', 44'; Wellen 34'; Fuchs 60'	Report	Gilardi 39'

Umpires:
Deon Nel (RSA)
Kim Hong-lae (KOR)

=== Awards ===
Top Goalscorers	Player of the Tournament	Goalkeeper of the Tournament	Young Player of the Tournament
(Germany) Christopher Rühr (Spain) Pau Quemada	(Canada) David Carter	(Canada) David Carter	(Germany) Niklas Wellen

== Antwerp ==

Tournament details
- Host country: Belgium
- City: Brasschaat
- Dates: 20 June–5 July 2015
- Teams: 10
- Venue: KHC Dragons

Final positions
- Champions: Australia
- Runner-up: Belgium
- Third place: Great Britain

Tournament statistics
- Matches played: 33
- Goals scored: 159 (4.82 per match)
- Top scorer: (Australia) Blake Govers (7 goals)
- Best player: (Belgium) John-John Dohmen

All times are Central European Summer Time (UTC+02:00)

=== Umpires ===
Below are the 10 umpires appointed by the International Hockey Federation:

- Diego Barbas (ARG)
- Eduardo Lizana (ESP)
- Gareth Greenfield (NZL)
- Nathan Stagno (GBR)
- Eric Kim Lai Koh (MAS)
- Raghu Prasad (IND)
- Tim Pullman (AUS)
- Roel Van Eert (NED)
- Geoffroy van Elegem (BEL)
- John Wright (RSA)

=== First round ===
==== Pool A ====
Pos	Team	Pld	W	D	L	GF	GA	GD	Pts	Qualification
1	Australia	4	4	0	0	26	3	+23	12	Advance to quarterfinals
2	India	4	2	1	1	10	10	0	7	Advance to quarterfinals
3	Pakistan	4	1	2	1	7	11	−4	5	Advance to quarterfinals
4	France	4	1	1	2	8	16	−8	4	Advance to quarterfinals
5	Poland	4	0	0	4	2	13	−11	0	

Source: FIH.ch
Rules for classification: 1) points; 2) goal difference; 3) goals scored; 4) head-to-head result.

20 June 2015
18:00

India	3–2	France
Manpreet 27'; D. Walmiki 29'; Ramandeep 59'	Report	Sánchez 3'; Martin-Brisac 43'

Umpires:
John Wright (RSA)
Gareth Greenfield (NZL)

20 June 2015
20:00

Pakistan	2–1	Poland
Irfan 4'; Waqas 54'	Report	Bratkowski 51'

Umpires:
Nathan Stagno (GIB)
Eric Kim Lai Koh (MAS)

21 June 2015
18:00

Australia	10–0	France
K. Govers 3', 20'; Ockenden 10', 53'; Dwyer 12'; Gohdes 13'; Orchard 19'; Whetton 34'; B. Govers 45', 54'	Report

Umpires:
Roel Van Eert (NED)
Geoffroy van Elegem (BEL)

23 June 2015
16:00

India	3–0	Poland
Y. Walmiki 23'; Sardar 42'; D. Walmiki 52'	Report

Umpires:
Tim Pullman (AUS)
Geoffroy van Elegem (BEL)

24 June 2015
14:00

Poland	1–4	France
Wejezowski 45'	Report	H. Genestet 25'; Charlet 43', 58'; Kieffer 56'

Umpires:
Eduardo Lizana (ESP)
Eric Kim Lai Koh (MAS)

24 June 2015
20:00

Pakistan	1–6	Australia
Irfan 13'	Report	Whetton 9'; Beale 32'; Swann 42'; Dwyer 49'; B. Govers 54', 58'

Umpires:
Nathan Stagno (GIB)
Raghu Prasad (IND)

26 June 2015
16:00

Pakistan	2–2	India
Imran 23', 37'	Report	Ramandeep 13', 39'

Umpires:
Tim Pullman (AUS)
John Wright (RSA)

26 June 2015
20:00

Australia	4–0	Poland
K. Govers 10'; Whetton 32'; B. Govers 52'; Orchard 57'	Report

Umpires:
Gareth Greenfield (NZL)
Eric Kim Lai Koh (MAS)

28 June 2015
12:00

Pakistan	2–2	France
Waqas 36'; Dilber 45'	Report	Martin-Brisac 21'; Masson 38'

Umpires:
Roel Van Eert (NED)
Diego Barbas (ARG)

28 June 2015
16:00

India	2–6	Australia
Lakra 34'; Ramandeep 51'	Report	Zalewski 8'; Dwyer 14'; Ciriello 26', 33', 41'; K. Govers 42'

Umpires:
Nathan Stagno (GIB)
Eduardo Lizana (ESP)

==== Pool B ====
Pos	Team	Pld	W	D	L	GF	GA	GD	Pts	Qualification
1	Belgium	4	3	1	0	12	3	+9	10	Advance to quarterfinals
2	Great Britain	4	2	2	0	15	6	+9	8	Advance to quarterfinals
3	Malaysia	4	2	0	2	8	9	−1	6	Advance to quarterfinals
4	Ireland	4	1	1	2	11	8	+3	4	Advance to quarterfinals
5	China	4	0	0	4	3	23	−20	0	

Source: FIH.ch
Rules for classification: 1) points; 2) goal difference; 3) goals scored; 4) head-to-head result.

21 June 2015
12:00

China	2–3	Malaysia
Li 38'; Zhang 54'	Report	Faizal 18'; Haziq 30'; Razie 53'

Umpires:
Raghu Prasad (IND)
Diego Barbas (ARG)

21 June 2015
16:00

Great Britain	2–2	Belgium
Middleton 23'; Brogdon 32'	Report	Dohmen 19'; Dockier 48'

Umpires:
Tim Pullman (AUS)
Eduardo Lizana (ESP)

23 June 2015
12:00

Great Britain	2–2	Ireland
Middleton 5'; Griffiths 8'	Report	Good 19'; Jackson 36'

Umpires:
John Wright (RSA)
Roel Van Eert (NED)

23 June 2015
18:00

Belgium	6–0	China
Thiery 15'; Keusters 20', 29', 50'; Gougnard 49'; Briels 54'	Report

Umpires:
Gareth Greenfield (NZL)
Diego Barbas (ARG)

25 June 2015
14:00

Malaysia	4–2	Ireland
Izwan 13', 55'; Razie 16'; Sukri 39'	Report	Caruth 14'; O'Donoghue 19'

Umpires:
Gareth Greenfield (NZL)
Eduardo Lizana (ESP)

25 June 2015
16:00

Great Britain	8–1	China
Catlin 4', 55'; Ward 18', 43'; Gleghorne 23', 36'; Jackson 38'; Brogdon 42'	Report	Li 26'

Umpires:
Roel Van Eert (NED)
Diego Barbas (ARG)

26 June 2015
14:00

Ireland	6–0	China
Sothern 19', 19', 33'; Caruth 22'; Gormley 32'; Dowds 38'	Report

Umpires:
Geoffroy van Elegem (BEL)
Raghu Prasad (IND)

26 June 2015
18:00

Malaysia	0–2	Belgium
	Report	Thiery 38'; Gougnard 39'

Umpires:
Nathan Stagno (GIB)
Roel Van Eert (NED)

28 June 2015
14:00

Malaysia	1–3	Great Britain
Haziq 14'	Report	Condon 31'; Jackson 49'; Ward 50'

Umpires:
Raghu Prasad (IND)
Tim Pullman (AUS)

28 June 2015
18:00

Belgium	2–1	Ireland
Luypaert 19'; Dohmen 60'	Report	O'Donoghue 23'

Umpires:
John Wright (RSA)
Gareth Greenfield (NZL)

=== Second round ===
Quarter-finals
1 July 2015
Australia	4
Ireland	1
1 July 2015
Great Britain	2
Pakistan	1
1 July 2015
India	3
Malaysia	2
1 July 2015
Belgium	5
France	4

Semi-finals
3 July 2015
Australia	3
Great Britain	1
3 July 2015
India	0
Belgium	4

Final
5 July 2015
Australia	1
Belgium	0
Third place
5 July 2015
Great Britain	5
India	1

==== Quarterfinals ====
1 July 2015
13:00

Australia	4–1	Ireland
Gohdes 22'; Dwyer 45'; Orchard 55'; B. Govers 55'	Report	O'Donoghue 57'

Umpires:
Raghu Prasad (IND)
Eric Kim Lai Koh (MAS)

1 July 2015
15:30

Great Britain	2–1	Pakistan
Griffiths 4'; Brogdon 9'	Report	Bhutta 48'

Umpires:
Tim Pullman (AUS)
Roel Van Eert (NED)

1 July 2015
18:00

India	3–2	Malaysia
Satbir 3'; Jasjit 49', 56'	Report	Razie 15'; Shahril 23'

Umpires:
John Wright (RSA)
Diego Barbas (ARG)

1 July 2015
20:30

Belgium	5–4	France
Van Aubel 1'; Dockier 15'; Stockbroekx 33'; Dohmen 42'; Boon 46'	Report	M. Genestet 26', 54'; Kieffer 30'; Coisne 45'

Umpires:
Nathan Stagno (GIB)
Eduardo Lizana (ESP)

==== Ninth and tenth place ====
1 July 2015
10:30

Poland	4–2	China
Żywiczka 5'; Hulbój 30'; Majchrzak 33'; Wachowiak 44'	Report	Guo 20'; Du C. 25'

Umpires:
Geoffroy van Elegem (BEL)
Gareth Greenfield (NZL)

==== Fifth to eighth place classification ====
Crossover
3 July 2015
Ireland	1
Pakistan	0
3 July 2015
Malaysia	4
France	1

Fifth place match
5 July 2015
Ireland	4
Malaysia	1
Seventh place match
5 July 2015
Pakistan	1
France	2

===== Crossover =====
3 July 2015
13:00

Ireland	1–0	Pakistan
Sothern 46'	Report

Umpires:
Nathan Stagno (GIB)
Raghu Prasad (IND)

3 July 2015
15:30

Malaysia	4–1	France
Haziq 19'; Azuan 37'; Faizal 47'; Razie 57'	Report	Kieffer 18'

Umpires:
Roel Van Eert (NED)
Tim Pullman (AUS)

===== Seventh and eighth place =====
5 July 2015
10:30

Pakistan	1–2	France
Toseeq 48'	Report	Martin-Brisac 13'; H. Genestet 30'

Umpires:
Geoffroy van Elegem (BEL)
Eduardo Lizana (ESP)

===== Fifth and sixth place =====
5 July 2015
13:00

Ireland	4–1	Malaysia
Good 5'; Caruth 8'; Sothern 40'; Darling 60'	Report	Faiz 55'

Umpires:
Nathan Stagno (GIB)
John Wright (RSA)

==== First to fourth place classification ====
===== Semifinals =====
3 July 2015
18:30

India	0–4	Belgium
	Report	Van Aubel 2', 41', 53'; Cosyns 53'

Umpires:
John Wright (RSA)
Eric Kim Lai Koh (MAS)

3 July 2015
20:30

Australia	3–1	Great Britain
B. Govers 28'; Beale 38'; Whetton 51'	Report	Catlin 36'

Umpires:
Diego Barbas (ARG)
Gareth Greenfield (NZL)

===== Third and fourth place =====
5 July 2015
15:30

Great Britain	5–1	India
Brogdon 11'; Griffiths 27'; Jackson 37'; Dixon 42'; Middleton 44'	Report	Rupinder Pal 60'

Umpires:
Tim Pullman (AUS)
Eric Kim Lai Koh (MAS)

===== Final =====
5 July 2015
18:00

Australia	1–0	Belgium
Ciriello 60+'	Report

Umpires:
Roel Van Eert (NED)
Raghu Prasad (IND)

=== Awards ===
Top Goalscorers	Player of the Tournament	Goalkeeper of the Tournament	Young Player of the Tournament
(Australia) Blake Govers	(Belgium) John-John Dohmen	(Ireland) David Harte	(Australia) Blake Govers

== Final rankings ==
Qualification for 2016 Summer Olympics

Rank	Buenos Aires	Antwerp
1	Germany	Australia
2	Argentina	Belgium
3	Netherlands	Great Britain
4	Canada	India
5	Spain	Ireland
6	New Zealand	Malaysia
7	South Korea	France
8	Japan	Pakistan
9	Egypt	Poland
10	Austria	China

Continental champions
Qualified through 2014–15 FIH Hockey World League

== Goalscorers ==
The following goalscorers list comprises players from both events.

There were 299 goals scored in 66 matches, for an average of 4.53 goals per match.

7 goals

- (Australia) Blake Govers

6 goals

- (Germany) Christopher Rühr
- (Spain) Pau Quemada

5 goals

- (Argentina) Gonzalo Peillat
- (Germany) Florian Fuchs
- (Ireland) Alan Sothern
- (Netherlands) Mink van der Weerden
- (South Korea) Lee Nam-Yong

4 goals

- (Argentina) Juan Ignacio Gilardi
- (Australia) Christopher Ciriello
- (Australia) Jamie Dwyer
- (Australia) Kieran Govers
- (Australia) Jacob Whetton
- (Belgium) Florent van Aubel
- (United Kingdom) Alastair Brogdon
- (Germany) Niklas Wellen
- (India) Ramandeep Singh
- (Malaysia) Razie Rahim
- (Netherlands) Billy Bakker
- (New Zealand) Simon Child
- (South Korea) Nam Hyun-Woo

3 goals

- (Australia) Simon Orchard
- (Belgium) John-John Dohmen
- (Belgium) Amaury Keusters
- (Egypt) Hamada Atef
- (France) Jean-Laurent Kieffer
- (France) Simon Martin-Brisac
- (United Kingdom) Nicholas Catlin
- (United Kingdom) Christopher Griffiths
- (United Kingdom) Ashley Jackson
- (United Kingdom) Barry Middleton
- (United Kingdom) Samuel Ward
- (Germany) Moritz Fürste
- (Germany) Mats Grambusch
- (Germany) Christopher Zeller
- (Ireland) Peter Caruth
- (Ireland) Shane O'Donoghue
- (Malaysia) Haziq Shamsul
- (Netherlands) Jeroen Hertzberger
- (Netherlands) Bob de Voogd

2 goals

- (Argentina) Ignacio Ortíz
- (Australia) Daniel Beale
- (Australia) Matthew Gohdes
- (Australia) Edward Ockenden
- (Belgium) Sébastien Dockier
- (Belgium) Simon Gougnard
- (Belgium) Dorian Thiery
- (Canada) Devohn Noronha
- (China) Li Zecheng
- (France) Victor Charlet
- (France) Hugo Genestet
- (France) Martin Genestet
- (United Kingdom) Mark Gleghorne
- (Germany) Oskar Deecke
- (Germany) Tobias Hauke
- (India) Jasjit Singh Kular
- (India) Devindar Walmiki
- (Ireland) Kyle Good
- (Japan) Kenji Kitazato
- (Japan) Genki Mitani
- (Japan) Toshi Tachibana
- (Malaysia) Faizal Saari
- (Malaysia) Izwan Tajuddin
- (Netherlands) Constantijn Jonker
- (Netherlands) Robbert Kempermann
- (New Zealand) Steven Edwards
- (New Zealand) Nicholas Haig
- (New Zealand) Hugo Inglis
- (Pakistan) Muhammad Imran
- (Pakistan) Muhammad Irfan
- (Pakistan) Muhammad Waqas
- (South Korea) Oh Dae-Keun
- (South Korea) You Hyo-Sik
- (South Korea) Jang Jong-Hyun
- (Spain) Albert Beltrán
- (Spain) Andrés Mir

1 goal

- (Argentina) Facundo Callioni
- (Argentina) Nicolás Della Torre
- (Argentina) Pedro Ibarra
- (Argentina) Matías Paredes
- (Argentina) Lucas Vila
- (Australia) Matthew Swann
- (Australia) Aran Zalewski
- (Austria) Alexander Bele
- (Austria) Michael Körper
- (Austria) Dominic Uher
- (Belgium) Tom Boon
- (Belgium) Thomas Briels
- (Belgium) Tanguy Cosyns
- (Belgium) Loïck Luypaert
- (Belgium) Emmanuel Stockbroekx
- (Canada) Gordon Johnston
- (Canada) James Kirkpatrick
- (Canada) Sukhi Panesar
- (Canada) Mark Pearson
- (Canada) Matthew Sarmento
- (China) Du Chen
- (China) Guo Xiaoping
- (China) Zhang Zhixuan
- (Egypt) Amr El-Hady
- (Egypt) Mohamed Essam
- (Egypt) Mahmoud Mamdouh
- (France) Aristide Coisne
- (France) Charles Masson
- (France) Oliver Sánchez
- (United Kingdom) David Condon
- (United Kingdom) Adam Dixon
- (Germany) Linus Butt
- (India) Birendra Lakra
- (India) Manpreet Singh
- (India) Rupinder Pal Singh
- (India) Sardar Singh
- (India) Satbir Singh
- (India) Yuvraj Walmiki
- (Ireland) Michael Darling
- (Ireland) Stephen Dowds
- (Ireland) Ronan Gormley
- (Ireland) John Jackson
- (Japan) Koji Kayukawa
- (Japan) Hiroki Sakamoto
- (Malaysia) Azuan Hasan
- (Malaysia) Faiz Jali
- (Malaysia) Sukri Mutalib
- (Malaysia) Shahril Saabah
- (Netherlands) Seve van Ass
- (Netherlands) Rogier Hofman
- (Netherlands) Robert van der Horst
- (Netherlands) Niek van der Schoot
- (Netherlands) Valentin Verga
- (New Zealand) Phil Burrows
- (New Zealand) Andrew Hayward
- (New Zealand) Stephen Jenness
- (New Zealand) Shea McAleese
- (New Zealand) Kane Russell
- (Pakistan) Muhammad Umar Bhutta
- (Pakistan) Muhammad Dilber
- (Pakistan) Muhammad Toseeq
- (Poland) Pavel Bratkowski
- (Poland) Mateusz Hulbój
- (Poland) Karol Majchrzak
- (Poland) Tomász Wachowiak
- (Poland) Maciej Wejezowski
- (Poland) Bartosz Żywiczka
- (South Korea) Hyun Hye-Sung
- (South Korea) Lee Jung-Jun
- (South Korea) Kang Moon-Kyu
- (South Korea) Kim Young-Jin
- (Spain) Gabriel Dabanch
- (Spain) Álvaro Iglesias
- (Spain) Xavi Lleonart

Source: Buenos Aires Antwerp
