= 2014 Men's Hockey Investec Cup =

2014 Women's Hockey Investec Cup
Tournament details
- Host country: England
- City: London
- Dates: 9–13 July 2014
- Teams: 4
- Venue(s): Lee Valley Hockey and Tennis Centre

Final positions
- Champions: England
- Runner-up: Ireland
- Third place: South Africa

Tournament statistics
- Matches played: 8
- Goals scored: 38 (4.75 per match)
- Top scorer(s): (England) Ashley Jackson (4 goals)

The 2014 Men's Hockey Investec Cup was a men's field hockey tournament held at the Lee Valley Hockey and Tennis Centre. It took place between 9–13 July 2014 in London, England. A total of four teams competed for the title.

England won the tournament by defeating Ireland 4–2 in a penalty shoot-out following a 2–2 draw in the final. South Africa won the bronze medal by defeating Scotland 3–0 in the third and fourth playoff.

== Participating nations ==
A total of four teams competed for the title:

- England
- Ireland
- Scotland
- South Africa

== Results ==
=== Pool matches ===
Pos	Team	Pld	W	D	L	GF	GA	GD	Pts	Qualification
1	England	3	3	0	0	17	1	+16	9	Final
2	Ireland	3	1	1	1	6	7	−1	4	Final
3	South Africa	3	1	0	2	5	13	−8	3	Third and fourth place
4	Scotland	3	0	1	2	3	10	−7	1	Third and fourth place

Source: FIH
Rules for classification: 1) points; 2) goal difference; 3) goals scored; 4) head-to-head result.

9 July 2014
17:15

Ireland	4–2	South Africa
O'Donoghue 19'; Darling 29'; Sothern 41', 45'		T. Paton 25'; Louw 47'

Umpires:
Will Drury (WAL)
Fraser Bell (SCO)

9 July 2014
19:30

England	6–0	Scotland
Jackson 2', 67'; Weir 11'; Gleghorne 27'; Mantell 31'; Roper 60'	Report

Umpires:
Warren McCully (IRL)
Peter Wright (RSA)

10 July 2014
17:15

Scotland	1–1	Ireland
Bain 15'	Report	Cockram 70+'

Umpires:
Will Drury (WAL)
Dan Barstow (ENG)

10 July 2014
19:30

England	7–0	South Africa
Jackson 6', 21'; Catlin 17', 32'; Middleton 19'; Mantell 57'; Gleghorne 66'	Report

Umpires:
Warren McCully (IRL)
Fraser Bell (SCO)

12 July 2014
09:45

South Africa	3–2	Scotland
Smith 17'; W. Paton 19' de Voux 43'	Report	Coultas 45'; Adams 48'

Umpires:
Will Drury (WAL)
Dan Barstow (ENG)

12 July 2014
12:00

Ireland	1–4	England
Gormley 42'	Report	Middleton 11'; Brogdon 31'; Martin 34'; Weir 46'

Umpires:
Peter Wright (RSA)
Fraser Bell (SCO)

=== Classification matches ===
==== Third and fourth place ====
13 July 2014
09:45

South Africa	3–0	Scotland
Smith 45', 64'; Sibbald 62'	Report

Umpires:
Warren McCully (IRE)
Dan Barstow (ENG)

==== Final ====
13 July 2014
14:45

England	2–2	Ireland
Brogdon 6'; Condon 49'	Report	Magee 36'; Darling 69'
Penalties
Jackson (penalty shoot-out scored); Middleton (penalty shoot-out scored); Martin (penalty shoot-out scored); Mantell (penalty shoot-out scored)	4–2	(penalty shoot-out scored) Sothern; (penalty shoot-out missed) Magee; (penalty shoot-out missed) Watt; (penalty shoot-out scored) Robson

Umpires:
Will Drury (WAL)
Peter Wright (RSA)

== Statistics ==
=== Final standings ===
Pos	Team	Pld	W	D	L	GF	GA	GD	Pts	Final Result
1st place, gold medalist(s)	England	4	3	1	0	19	3	+16	10	Gold Medal
2nd place, silver medalist(s)	Ireland	4	1	2	1	8	9	−1	5	Silver Medal
3rd place, bronze medalist(s)	South Africa	4	2	0	2	8	13	−5	6	Bronze Medal
4	Scotland	4	0	1	3	3	13	−10	1	Fourth Place

Source: FIH

=== Goalscorers ===
4 Goals

- (England) Ashley Jackson

3 Goals

- (South Africa) Austin Smith

2 Goals

- (England) Alastair Brogdon
- (England) Nicholas Catlin
- (England) Mark Gleghorne
- (England) Simon Mantell
- (England) Barry Middleton
- (England) Henry Weir
- (Ireland) Michael Darling
- (Ireland) Alan Sothern

1 Goal

- (England) David Condon
- (England) Harry Martin
- (England) Phil Roper
- (Ireland) Timothy Cockram
- (Ireland) Ronan Gormley
- (Ireland) Eugene Magee
- (Ireland) Shane O'Donoghue
- (Scotland) Wei Adams
- (Scotland) Kenny Bain
- (Scotland) Dan Coultas
- (South Africa) Jean-Pierre de Voux
- (South Africa) Lance Louw
- (South Africa) Taine Paton
- (South Africa) Wade Paton
- (South Africa) Daniel Sibbald
