= David Fitzgerald (field hockey) =

Ireland men's hockey international

Personal information
- Full name: David Fitzgerald
- Born: 8 October 1986 (age 40)

Sport
- Sport: Field hockey
- Position: Goalkeeper
Youth career
- Years: Team
- 1995–2005: Monkstown
- 1999–2005: St. Andrew's College
Senior career
Years	Team	Caps	Goals
2005–	Monkstown	-	-
National team
Years	Team	Caps	Goals
2010–	Ireland	52	-
Medal record
Representing Ireland
EuroHockey Championships
Bronze medal – third place	2015 London

David Fitzgerald (born 8 October 1986) is an Irish hockey player. He plays for men's field hockey international. He was the reserve goalkeeper in the Ireland squad that won the bronze medal at the 2015 Men's EuroHockey Nations Championship. He was also in the squads that represented Ireland at the 2016 Summer Olympics and at the 2018 Men's Hockey World Cup. Between 2007–08 and 2016–17, Fitzgerald played in six Irish Senior Cup finals for Monkstown. He was also a member of the Monkstown team that won three successive Men's Irish Hockey League titles between 2012–13 and 2014–15. He was Goalkeeper of the Tournament when Monkstown won the 2014 EuroHockey Club Trophy.

== Early years and education ==
Between 1999 and 2005 Fitzgerald attended St. Andrew's College. Between 2007 and 2012 he attended University College Dublin where he gained a Bachelor's degree in Business and Law. In 2015–16 he gained a Certificate in Sport Psychology from Dún Laoghaire Institute of Art, Design and Technology.

== Domestic teams ==
=== St. Andrew's College ===
In 2005 Fitzgerald, together with Alan Sothern, was a member of the St. Andrew's College team that lost 1–0 to Michael Darling and Wesley College in the Leinster Schools Senior Cup final.

=== Monkstown ===
Fitzgerald began playing field hockey with Monkstown at the age of nine. Between 2007–08 and 2016–17 he played in six Irish Senior Cup finals for Monkstown. In 2007–08, 2009–10 and 2010–11 he finished on the losing side. In 2012–13 he helped Monkstown end their ninety nine-year wait for an Irish Senior Cup title. Monkstown and Fitzgerald won the cup again in 2015–16 and were runners up in 2016–17. Together with Graham Shaw, Peter Caruth and Kyle Good, Fitzgerald also helped Monkstown win three successive Men's Irish Hockey League titles between 2012–13 and 2014–15. Fitzgerald has also represented Monkstown in European competitions. He was Goalkeeper of the Tournament when Monkstown won the 2014 EuroHockey Club Trophy and also played for Monkstown in the 2014–15 and the 2015–16 Euro Hockey Leagues.

== Ireland international ==
Fitzgerald made his senior debut for Ireland in July 2010 against France. During the 2010s he was named as the reserve goalkeeper to David Harte in various Ireland tournament squads. Fitzgerald was a member of the Ireland team that won a 2012–13 Men's FIH Hockey World League Round 1 tournament. He was also a member of the Ireland squad that qualified for the 2016 Summer Olympics after finishing fifth in the 2014–15 Men's FIH Hockey World League Semifinals. In November 2018 he made his 50th senior Ireland appearance against the Netherlands.

Tournaments	Place
2011 Men's Hockey Champions Challenge II	1st
2011 Men's EuroHockey Nations Championship	5th
2012 Men's Field Hockey Olympic Qualifier	2nd
2012–13 Men's FIH Hockey World League Round 1	1st
2012 Men's Hockey Champions Challenge I	3rd
2012–13 Men's FIH Hockey World League Round 2	2nd
2012–13 Men's FIH Hockey World League Semifinals	7th
2013 Men's EuroHockey Nations Championship	6th
2014 Men's Hockey Champions Challenge I	4th
2014 Men's Hockey Investec Cup	2nd
2014–15 Men's FIH Hockey World League Round 2	1st
2014–15 Men's FIH Hockey World League Semifinals	5th
2015 Men's EuroHockey Nations Championship	3rd place, bronze medalist(s)
2016 Summer Olympics	10th
2018 Men's Hockey World Cup	14th

== Occupation ==
Since September 2013 he has worked as a specialist goalkeeping coach with Dublin University Ladies' Hockey Club. Since September 2014 he has worked as a self-employed personal trainer.

== Honours ==
Ireland

- Men's FIH Hockey World League Round 1
  - Winners: 2012 Cardiff
- Men's FIH Hockey World League Round 2
  - Runners up: 2013 New Delhi

Monkstown

- Men's Irish Hockey League
  - Winners: 2012–13, 2013–14, 2014–15: 3
- Irish Senior Cup
  - Winners: 2012–13, 2015–16: 2
  - Runners up: 2007–08, 2009–10, 2010–11, 2016–17: 4
- EuroHockey Club Trophy
  - Winners: 2014: 1

St. Andrew's College

- Leinster Schools Senior Cup
  - Runners up: 2005: 1
