= Stuart Loughrey =

Ireland men's field hockey international

Personal information
- Full name: Stuart Loughrey
- Born: 20 February 1991 (age 35) County Dublin, Ireland
- Height: 5 ft 9 in (175 cm)

Sport
- Sport: Field hockey
- Position: Defender
Youth career
- Years: Team
- 200x–2008: St. Andrew's College
Senior career
Years	Team	Caps	Goals
2008–2009	Pembroke Wanderers	-	-
2009–2013	Loughborough Students	-	-
2013–2014	Team Bath Buccaneers	-	-
2014–2015	Cannock	-	-
2015–2017	Hampstead & Westminster	-	-
2017–	Reading	-	-
National team
Years	Team	Caps	Goals
2011–	Ireland	115	(5)

Stuart Loughrey (born 20 February 1991) is an Ireland men's field hockey international. He played for Ireland at the 2018 Men's Hockey World Cup.

== Early years, family and education ==
Loughrey's mother and his brothers, Mark and David, all played field hockey. Loughrey was educated at St. Andrew's College and Loughborough University. He is a qualified PE teacher. In 2015 he began working at West London Free School. Mark Loughrey is also an Ireland international and also played for Pembroke Wanderers.

== Domestic teams ==
=== St. Andrew's College ===
In 2008 Loughrey helped St. Andrew's College win the All Ireland Schoolboys Hockey Championship after defeating Wesley College 2–1 in the final.

=== Pembroke Wanderers ===
Loughrey, together with David Harte, Conor Harte, Ronan Gormley, Justin Sheriff, Alan Sothern and Craig Fulton, was a member of the Pembroke Wanderers that won two successive Irish Senior Cup finals in 2007–08 and 2008–09. In 2008–09 Loughrey also helped Wanderers win the Men's Irish Hockey League title.

=== Men's England Hockey League ===
After moving to England to study at Loughborough University, Loughrey subsequently went on to play for several clubs in the Men's England Hockey League, including Loughborough Students, Team Bath Buccaneers, Cannock, Hampstead & Westminster and Reading.

== Ireland international ==
Loughrey captained Ireland at Under-18 level before making his senior debut in April 2011 during a series of matches against Canada. Loughrey was a member of the Ireland team that won the 2011 Men's Hockey Champions Challenge II. He also represented Ireland at the 2013 Men's EuroHockey Nations Championship, scoring a goal in a 3–3 draw with the Czech Republic. In June 2017 Loughrey was a member of the Ireland team that won the Hamburg Masters, defeating Germany 4–2 in the final. He also represented Ireland at the 2018 Men's Hockey World Cup.

Tournaments	Place
2011 Men's Hockey Champions Challenge II	1st
2012 Men's Field Hockey Olympic Qualifier	2nd
2012 Men's Hockey Champions Challenge I	3rd
2012–13 Men's FIH Hockey World League Round 2	2nd
2012–13 Men's FIH Hockey World League Semifinals	7th
2013 Men's EuroHockey Nations Championship	6th
2014 Men's Hockey Investec Cup	2nd
2017 Hamburg Masters	1st
2016–17 Men's FIH Hockey World League Semifinals	5th
2017 Men's EuroHockey Nations Championship	6th
2018 Sultan Azlan Shah Cup	6th
2018 Men's Four Nations Cup	4th
2018 Men's Hockey World Cup	14th
2019 Men's EuroHockey Nations Championship	8th

== Honours ==
Ireland

- Men's Hockey Champions Challenge II
  - Winners: 2011
- Hamburg Masters
  - Winners: 2017
- Men's FIH Hockey World League Round 2
  - Runners up: 2013 New Delhi
- Men's Field Hockey Olympic Qualifier
  - Runners up: 2012
- Men's Hockey Investec Cup
  - Runners up: 2014

Reading

- EH Men's Championship Cup
  - Winners: 2017–18: 1

Pembroke Wanderers

- Men's Irish Hockey League
  - Winners: 2008–09
- Irish Senior Cup
  - Winners: 2007–08, 2008–09: 2

St. Andrew's College

- All Ireland Schoolboys Hockey Championship
  - Winners: 2008
