= Michael Darling (field hockey) =

Ireland men's hockey international

Personal information
- Full name: Michael R. Darling
- Born: 3 July 1988 (age 38) Dublin, Ireland
- Height: 170 cm (5 ft 7 in)
- Weight: 65 kg (143 lb)

Sport
- Sport: Field hockey
- Position: Forward
Youth career
- Years: Team
- 199x–2000: Rathgar Junior School
- 1996–2005: Three Rock Rovers
- 200x–200x: Wesley College
Senior career
Years	Team	Caps	Goals
2005–2009	Three Rock Rovers	-	-
2009–2010	KHC Leuven	-	-
2010–2011	HC Den Bosch	-	-
2011–2012	SCHC	-	-
2012–2015	Three Rock Rovers	-	-
2015–2016	HC Rotterdam	-	-
2016–	Three Rock Rovers	-	-
National team
Years	Team	Caps	Goals
2006–2018	Ireland	183	(51)
Medal record
Representing Ireland
EuroHockey Championships
Bronze medal – third place	2015 London

Michael Darling (born 3 July 1988), also referred to as Mitch Darling, is a former Ireland men's field hockey international and Rio 2016 Olympian. Between 2006 and 2018 Darling made 183 appearances and scored 51 goals for Ireland. He was a member of the Ireland team that won the bronze medal at the 2015 Men's EuroHockey Nations Championship. He also represented Ireland at the 2016 Summer Olympics and at the 2018 Men's Hockey World Cup. At club level, Darling has won the Irish Senior Cup with Three Rock Rovers. He also played for Rovers in the Euro Hockey League.

== Early years, family and education ==
Darling is from Sandyford in Dún Laoghaire–Rathdown. He is the son of Dr. Michael Darling and his wife, Fiona. He has three siblings – two brothers, Jonny and Chris, and a sister, Katie. Darling is married to Erika. He was educated at Rathgar Junior School, where in 2000 he captained the boys field hockey team, and at Wesley College. Between 2006 and 2009 he attended University College Dublin where he became a Bachelor of Civil Law. Between 2011 and 2012 he attended Vrije Universiteit Amsterdam where he completed his master's in International Business Law. Between 2013 and 2015 he completed his legal studies with the Law Society of Ireland.

== Domestic teams ==
=== Wesley College ===
In 2005 Darling scored the only goal in a 1–0 win as Wesley College defeated a St. Andrew's College team featuring Alan Sothern and David Fitzgerald in the Leinster Schools Senior Cup final. He also helped Wesley win the All Ireland Schoolboys Hockey Championship. After becoming an Ireland international, Darling returned to Wesley as a coach.

=== Three Rock Rovers ===
Darling began playing for Three Rock Rovers at under-8 level. Together with Kyle Good, Darling was a member of the Rovers team that won the 2008 All-Ireland Club Championship and played in the 2008–09 Euro Hockey League. Darling was also a member of the Rovers teams that won the Irish Senior Cup in 2013–14, 2017–18 and 2018–19. Between 2017 and 2019 he also helped Rovers win the EY Champions Trophy on three successive occasions. He also played for Rovers in the 2017–18 and 2018–19 Euro Hockey Leagues.

=== KHC Leuven ===
During the 2008–09 Euro Hockey League, Darling played for Three Rock Rovers against KHC Leuven. The 2009–10 season subsequently saw him invited to play for the Men's Belgian Hockey League team.

=== Hoofdklasse ===
Darling has also played for HC Den Bosch, SCHC and HC Rotterdam in the Hoofdklasse. His teammates at HC Den Bosch included Alan Sothern.

== Ireland international ==
Between 2006 and 2018 Darling made 183 senior appearances and scored 51 goals for Ireland. He made his senior international debut in July 2006 against England at the age of 18. He had previously represented Ireland at Under-18 level. Darling was a member of the Ireland team that won the 2009 Men's EuroHockey Nations Trophy. He also helped Ireland win Men's FIH Hockey World League tournaments in 2012 and 2015. Darling made his 150th senior Ireland appearance at the 2014–15 Men's FIH Hockey World League Semifinals. He was a member of the Ireland team that won the bronze medal at the 2015 Men's EuroHockey Nations Championship. He also represented Ireland at the 2016 Summer Olympics and at the 2018 Men's Hockey World Cup. He made his last senior appearance for Ireland at the World Cup against England.

Tournaments	Place
2009 Men's EuroHockey Nations Trophy	1st
2009 Men's Hockey Champions Challenge II	2nd
2009 Men's Hockey World Cup Qualifiers	3rd
2011 Men's EuroHockey Nations Championship	5th
2012 Men's Field Hockey Olympic Qualifier	2nd
2012–13 Men's FIH Hockey World League Round 1	1st
2012 Men's Hockey Champions Challenge I	3rd
2012–13 Men's FIH Hockey World League Round 2	2nd
2013 Men's EuroHockey Nations Championship	6th
2014 Men's Hockey Investec Cup	2nd
2014–15 Men's FIH Hockey World League Round 2	1st
2014–15 Men's FIH Hockey World League Semifinals	5th
2015 Men's EuroHockey Nations Championship	3rd place, bronze medalist(s)
2016 Summer Olympics	10th
2018 Men's Hockey World Cup	14th

== Solicitor ==
Between 2013 and 2018 Darling worked as a trainee solicitor/solicitor with A&L Goodbody. His colleagues at A&L Goodbody included Cecelia Joyce. Since 2018 he has worked for Allied Irish Banks as part of their corporate legal team.

== Honours ==
Ireland

- Men's EuroHockey Nations Trophy
  - Winners: 2009
- Men's FIH Hockey World League Round 1
  - Winners: 2012 Cardiff
- Men's FIH Hockey World League Round 2
  - Winners: 2015 San Diego
  - Runners up: 2013 New Delhi
- Men's Hockey Champions Challenge II
  - Runners up: 2009
- Men's Field Hockey Olympic Qualifier
  - Runners up: 2012
- Men's Hockey Investec Cup
  - Runners up: 2014

Three Rock Rovers

- Men's Irish Hockey League
  - Runners Up: 2017–18, 2018–19: 2
- EY Champions Trophy
  - Winners: 2017, 2018, 2019: 3
- Irish Senior Cup
  - Winners: 2013–14, 2017–18, 2018–19: 3

Wesley College

- All Ireland Schoolboys Hockey Championship
  - Winners: ?
- Leinster Schools Senior Cup
  - Winners: 2005: 2
