= Eugene Magee =

Irish field hockey player (b. 1986)

Personal information
- Full name: Eugene Magee
- Born: 1 April 1986 (age 40) County Down, Northern Ireland
- Height: 1.77 m (5 ft 10 in)
- Weight: 83 kg (183 lb)

Sport
- Sport: Field hockey
- Position: Midfielder / Forward
Youth career
- Years: Team
- 1997–2004: Banbridge Academy
Senior career
Years	Team	Caps	Goals
200x–2009	Banbridge	-	-
200x–2009	→ Ulster	-	-
2004–2009	→ Ulster Elks	-	-
2007	→ HGC	-	-
2008	→ Adelaide Hotshots	-	-
2009–2012	KHC Dragons	-	-
2012–2013	Crefelder HTC	-	-
2013–	Banbridge	-	-
National team
Years	Team	Caps	Goals
2005–2019	Ireland	295	(46+)
Medal record
Men's field hockey
Representing Ireland
EuroHockey Championships
Bronze medal – third place	2015 London
- Updated on 7 November 2019

Eugene Magee (born 1 April 1986) is an Ireland men's field hockey international. He was a member of the Ireland team that won the bronze medal at the 2015 Men's EuroHockey Nations Championship. He also represented Ireland at the 2016 Summer Olympics and at the 2018 Men's Hockey World Cup. At club level he has won Men's Irish Hockey League, Irish Senior Cup and Kirk Cup titles with Banbridge. He has also scored for three clubs – HGC, KHC Dragons and Banbridge – in the Euro Hockey League.

== Early years, family and education ==
Magee's hometown is Ballela in County Down. He completed his elementary education at All Saints Ballela. In his youth Magee initially played hurling, representing Down/South Down at minor level. He continued to play hurling occasionally for Ballela, even after deciding to concentrate on field hockey. He played in two Down Junior Hurling Championship finals for Ballela. In 2008, he scored four goals when helping Ballela lift the Down title with a win over Clonduff. In 2015 he scored a point in their extra-time victory over Newry Shamrocks. Between 1997 and 2004, Magee attended Banbridge Academy where he first began to play field hockey. In a 2015 interview with The Irish News, Magee stated, "I quickly discovered that many of the hurling skills were easily transferable and I became quite good at hockey." Between 2004 and 2009, he attended Ulster University where he gained a BSc in Quantity Surveying. Between 2013 and 2014, he attended Queen's University Belfast where he gained a master's degree in Software Development. Magee's brother, Owen Magee, has also played field hockey for both Banbridge and Ireland and hurling for Ballela.

== Domestic teams ==
=== Banbridge ===
Magee began his senior career with Banbridge. While playing for Banbridge, he also represented Ulster at interprovincial level and Ulster Elks at intervarsity level. After brief spells playing professionally with HGC and Adelaide Hotshots, in 2009 Magee left Banbridge for KHC Dragons. After four seasons away, Magee re-joined Banbridge in 2013. In 2014 he helped Banbridge win the Eurohockey Champions Challenge I. In 2014–15 he captained Banbridge as they won both the Kirk Cup and the Irish Senior Cup. In 2016 he was a member of the Banbridge team that finished as runners up to Lisnagarvey in the EY Champions Trophy. In 2016–17 he a member of the Banbridge team that won a national double, winning both the Irish Senior Cup and the Men's Irish Hockey League. He scored twice in the Irish Senior Cup final as Banbridge defeated Monkstown 3–1. He also represented Banbridge in the 2016–17 Euro Hockey League.

=== HGC ===
In 2007 Magee played for HGC in the Hoofdklasse and the 2007–08 Euro Hockey League. His teammates at HGC included Iain Lewers, John Jermyn, Barry Middleton and Bram Lomans.

=== Adelaide Hotshots ===
In March 2008, following the 2008 Men's Field Hockey Olympic Qualifier, Magee played for Adelaide Hotshots in the Australian Hockey League.

=== KHC Dragons ===
Between 2009 and 2012 Magee played for KHC Dragons in the Men's Belgian Hockey League. He helped Dragons win national league titles and represented them in the 2010–11 and 2011–12 Euro Hockey Leagues. He helped them finish third in the 2011–12 competition.

=== Crefelder HTC ===
Magee spent the 2012–13 season playing for Crefelder HTC in the Bundesliga. His teammates at Crefelder HTC included Ronan Gormley.

== Ireland international ==
Magee made his senior debut for Ireland in 2005 against Belgium. He was a member of the Ireland teams that won the 2009 Men's EuroHockey Nations Trophy and the 2011 Men's Hockey Champions Challenge II. Magee also helped Ireland win Men's FIH Hockey World League tournaments in 2012, 2015 and 2017. In May 2015 Magee made his 200th senior appearance for Ireland in a game against France. After Ronan Gormley, he became the second Ireland men's international to reach the 200 mark. Gormley reached his double century earlier in May 2015. He was a member of the Ireland team that won the bronze medal at the 2015 Men's EuroHockey Nations Championship. He also represented Ireland at the 2016 Summer Olympics and at the 2018 Men's Hockey World Cup. In June 2017 Magee was a member of the Ireland team that won the Hamburg Masters, defeating Germany 4–2 in the final. He retired from international hockey after Ireland failed to qualify for the 2020 Summer Olympics.

Tournaments	Place
2007 Men's EuroHockey Nations Championship	7th
2008 Men's Field Hockey Olympic Qualifier	4th
2009 Men's Hockey Champions Challenge II	2nd
2009 Men's EuroHockey Nations Trophy	1st
2009 Men's Hockey World Cup Qualifiers	3rd
2011 Men's Hockey Champions Challenge II	1st
2011 Men's EuroHockey Nations Championship	5th
2012 Men's Field Hockey Olympic Qualifier	2nd
2012–13 Men's FIH Hockey World League Round 1	1st
2012 Men's Hockey Champions Challenge I	3rd
2012–13 Men's FIH Hockey World League Round 2	2nd
2013 Men's EuroHockey Nations Championship	6th
2014 Men's Hockey Champions Challenge I	4th
2014 Men's Hockey Investec Cup	2nd
2014–15 Men's FIH Hockey World League Round 2	1st
2014–15 Men's FIH Hockey World League Semi-finals	5th
2015 Men's EuroHockey Nations Championship	3rd place, bronze medalist(s)
2016 Summer Olympics	10th
2017 Hamburg Masters	1st
2016–17 Men's FIH Hockey World League Round 2	1st
2016–17 Men's FIH Hockey World League Semi-finals	5th
2018 Sultan Azlan Shah Cup	6th
2018 Men's Hockey World Cup	14th
2018–19 Men's FIH Series Finals	2nd
2019 Men's EuroHockey Nations Championship	8th

== Employment ==
Magee has worked as a quantity surveyor and as a software engineer.

== Honours ==
Ireland

- Hamburg Masters
  - Winners: 2017
- Men's FIH Hockey World League Round 1
  - Winners: 2012 Cardiff
- Men's FIH Hockey World League Round 2
  - Winners: 2015 San Diego, 2017 Belfast
  - Runners up: 2013 New Delhi
- Men's FIH Series Finals
  - Runners up: 2019 Le Touquet
- Men's Hockey Champions Challenge II
  - Winners: 2011
  - Runners up: 2009
- Men's EuroHockey Nations Trophy
  - Winners: 2009
- Men's Field Hockey Olympic Qualifier
  - Runners up: 2012
- Men's Hockey Investec Cup
  - Runners up: 2014

Banbridge

- Eurohockey Champions Challenge I
  - Winners: 2014: 1
- Men's Irish Hockey League
  - Winners: 2016–17 : 1
- Irish Senior Cup
  - Winners: 2014–15, 2016–17: 2
- Kirk Cup
  - Winners: 2014–15: 1
- EY Champions Trophy
  - Runners-up: 2016: 1

KHC Dragons

- Belgium Hockey League
  - Winners: 2009–10, 2010–11: 2
