= Bomfim =

Bomfim (with variations such as Bonfim, do Bomfim, or do Bonfim) is a Portuguese surname meaning "good end." It has a toponymic origin, referring to places such as the neighborhood of Bonfim (Porto)

Many people have adopted the surname due to their devotion to the Catholic saint Senhor do Bonfim, as a way to give thanks for blessings received in their lives.

Notable people with the surname include:

- Manuel Bomfim (born 1868), Brazilian polymath
- Antônio Maciel Bonfim (born 1905), Brazilian politician
- Caio Bonfim (born 1991), Brazilian athlete
- Sâmia Bomfim (born 1989), Brazilian politician
- Thiago Bomfim (born 1990), Brazilian field hockey player
- Uilliams Bomfim Souza (born 1989), Brazilian footballer
