= Kyle Good =

Ireland men's field hockey international

Personal information
- Full name: Kyle Good
- Born: 10 December 1991 (age 34) Shankill, Dublin; Ireland
- Height: 183 cm (6 ft 0 in)
- Weight: 88 kg (194 lb)

Sport
- Sport: Field hockey
- Position: Forward/Midfielder
Youth career
- Years: Team
- 2003–2010: Wesley College
Senior career
Years	Team	Caps	Goals
20xx–2010	Three Rock Rovers	-	-
2010–2014	Monkstown	-	-
2012–2014	→ DIT	-	-
2014–2015	KHC Dragons	-	-
2015–2017	Monkstown	-	-
2018–	Spencer HC	-	-
National team
Years	Team	Caps	Goals
2008–	Ireland	74	(17)
Medal record
Representing Ireland
EuroHockey Championships
Bronze medal – third place	2015 London	Team

Kyle Good (born 10 December 1991) is an Ireland men's field hockey international. He was a member of the Ireland team that won the bronze medal at the 2015 Men's EuroHockey Nations Championship. He also represented Ireland at the 2016 Summer Olympics. At club level he has won Men's Irish Hockey League titles, the Irish Senior Cup and the EuroHockey Club Trophy with Monkstown. He also played for three clubs – Three Rock Rovers, KHC Dragons and Monkstown – in the Euro Hockey League.

== Early years, family and education ==
Good received his early education at Rathmichael Parish National School. Between 2003 and 2010 he attended Wesley College where, in addition to field hockey, he also played rugby union and cricket and participated in track and field athletics. Between 2011 and 2014 he attended the Dublin Institute of Technology where he gained a Bachelor's degree in Human Resources and Personnel Administration.

== Domestic teams ==
=== Wesley College ===
In the 2007 Leinster Schoolboys' Senior Cup final, Good scored the opening goal as Wesley College defeated St. Andrew's College 3–2 after extra-time. Good was also a member of the Wesley College team that won the 2009 cup final. In 2008 Good played for Wesley College in the All Ireland Schoolboys Hockey Championship final, losing 2–1 to a St. Andrew's College team featuring Stuart Loughrey. Good captained Wesley College when they won the 2009 championship, defeating Wallace High School, Lisburn 3–2 in the final.

=== Three Rock Rovers ===
While still a student at Wesley College, Good also played for Three Rock Rovers. Together with Michael Darling he was a member of the Rovers team that won the 2008 All-Ireland Club Championship and played in the 2008–09 Euro Hockey League. In 2009, while playing for Three Rock Rovers, Good was named the ESB Under-18 Player of the Year. He was presented with the award by Stephen Martin.

=== Monkstown ===
In 2010 Good began playing for Monkstown. He subsequently helped Monkstown win the Men's Irish Hockey League title in both 2012–13 and 2013–14. Together with Graham Shaw and Peter Caruth, Good was also a member of the Monkstown team that won the 2014 EuroHockey Club Trophy. He also played for Monkstown in the 2015–16 Euro Hockey League. Good was a member of the Monkstown team that won the 2015–16 Irish Senior Cup. In 2017 he played for Monkstown in the EY Champions Trophy final, losing to his former team Three Rock Rovers. During 2017–18 Good took a break from playing field hockey.

=== DIT ===
While playing for Monkstown, Goode also represented Dublin Institute of Technology at intervarsity level. In 2012 he was a member of the first DIT team to play in the Mauritius Cup. In the 2013 Mauritius Cup final Good was a member of the DIT team that lost 3–2 to UCD.

=== KHC Dragons ===
During the 2014–15 season Good played for KHC Dragons in the Men's Belgian Hockey League. He teammates at Dragons included fellow Ireland international, Shane O'Donoghue. He helped Dragons win the league title and played for them in the 2014–15 Euro Hockey League.

=== Spencer ===
Since October 2017 Good has worked for DocuSign. In November 2018 his employment saw him move to London. During the 2018–19 season he played for Spencer Hockey Club in the South League.

== Ireland international ==
Good made his senior debut for Ireland in June 2011 in a 7–1 Celtic Cup win against France. He had previously played for Ireland at under-18 level. Good was a member of the Ireland team that won the bronze medal at the 2015 Men's EuroHockey Nations Championship. He also represented Ireland at the 2016 Summer Olympics.

Tournaments	Place
2012–13 Men's FIH Hockey World League Semifinals	7th
2013 Men's EuroHockey Nations Championship	6th
2014–15 Men's FIH Hockey World League Semifinals	5th
2015 Men's EuroHockey Nations Championship	3rd place, bronze medalist(s)
2016 Summer Olympics	10th

== Honours ==
Monkstown

- EuroHockey Club Trophy
  - Winners: 2014: 1
- Men's Irish Hockey League
  - Winners: 2012–13, 2013–14: 2
- Irish Senior Cup
  - Winners: 2015–16: 1
- EY Champions Trophy
  - Runners Up: 2017: 1

KHC Dragons

- Men's Belgian Hockey League
  - Winners: 2014–15: 1

DIT

- Mauritius Cup
  - Runners up: 2013

Three Rock Rovers

- All-Ireland Club Championship
  - Winners: 2008: 1

Wesley College

- All Ireland Schoolboys Hockey Championship
  - Winners: 2009
  - Runners up: 2008
- Leinster Schoolboys Senior Cup
  - Winners: 2007, 2009: 2
