= Victor Aly =

German field hockey player

Personal information
- Born: 2 June 1994 (age 32) Hamburg, Germany

Sport
- Sport: Field hockey
- Position: Goalkeeper
- Club: Rot-Weiss Köln
Youth career
- Team
- –: Grossflottbeker THGC
Senior career
Years	Team	Caps	Goals
–2012	Grossflottbeker THGC	-	-
2012–2020	Rot-Weiss Köln	-	-
2020–present	Grossflottbeker THGC	-	-
National team
Years	Team	Caps	Goals
2013–2014	Germany U21		-
2015–present	Germany	24	(0)
Medal record
Men's field hockey
Representing Germany
EuroHockey Championship
Silver medal – second place	2021 Amstelveen
Junior World Cup
Gold medal – first place	2013 New Delhi
EuroHockey Junior Championship
Silver medal – second place	2014 Waterloo
- Updated on 6 June 2021

Victor Aly (born 2 June 1994) is a German field hockey player who plays as a goalkeeper for the Grossflottbeker THGC and the German national team.

== Club career ==
Aly comes from Othmarschen in Hamburg so he started playing hockey for the local club Grossflottbeker THGC. He played eight years for Rot-Weiss Köln in Cologne. In May 2020, it was announced he returned to Großflottbek for the 2020–21 season.

== International career ==
Aly was a part of the Germany under-21 team which won the 2013 Junior World Cup. He made his debut for the senior national team in February 2015 in a test match against South Africa. In December 2019, he was nominated for the FIH Goalkeeper of the Year Award. On 28 May 2021, he was named in the squad for the 2021 EuroHockey Championship and was named as a reserve for the 2020 Summer Olympics.
