= Jonathan Bell (field hockey) =

Irish field hockey player (born 1987)

Jonny Bell (born 19 June 1987) is an Irish field hockey player who plays as a defender for Lisnagarvey Hockey Club. He competed for the Ireland men's national field hockey team at the 2016 Summer Olympics.
