= Thiago Bomfim =

Brazilian field hockey player (born 1990)

Personal information
- Full name: Thiago Bomfim Campos Dantas
- Born: 21 September 1990 (age 35) Rio de Janeiro, Brazil
- Height: 1.93 m (6 ft 4 in)
- Weight: 84 kg (185 lb)

Sport
- Sport: Field hockey
- Position: Goalkeeper
National team
Years	Team	Caps	Goals
–	Brazil	20	(0)
Medal record
Men's field hockey
Representing Brazil
South American Championship
Bronze medal – third place	2013 Santiago

Thiago Bomfim Campos Dantas (born September 21, 1990) is a Brazilian field hockey player. He competed for the Brazil men's national field hockey team at the 2016 Summer Olympics.
