= Andrés Mir =

Spanish field hockey player

Personal information
- Full name: Andrés Mir Bel
- Born: 25 January 1987 (age 39) Zaragoza, Spain
- Height: 1.86 m (6 ft 1 in)
- Weight: 80 kg (176 lb)

Sport
- Sport: Field hockey
- Position: Defender / Midfielder
Youth career
- Team
- –: Salduie 78
Senior career
Years	Team	Caps	Goals
–	CD Terrassa	-	-
–2015	Club de Campo	-	-
2013–2014	Delhi Waveriders	-	-
2015–2016	Bloemendaal	-	-
2016–2022	Club de Campo	-	-
2022	Metro Express Barishal	-	-
National team
Years	Team	Caps	Goals
–	Spain	150	-
- Updated on 27 February 2020

Andrés Mir Bel (born 25 January 1987) is a Spanish former field hockey player who played as a defender or midfielder for the Spanish national team.

At the 2012 Summer Olympics he competed with the Spanish national field hockey team in the men's tournament.

== Career ==
Mir played for CD Terrassa before he joined Club de Campo. In 2013 and 2014 he played two seasons for the Delhi Waveriders in the Hockey India League. In 2015 he left Club de Campo for Bloemendaal in the Dutch Hoofdklasse. After one season he returned to Club de Campo. After the 2021–22 season he retired from playing top-level hockey.
