= Tobias Walter =

German field hockey player

Tobi Walter
Personal information
- Full name: Tobias Walter
- Born: 16 February 1990 (age 36)
- Height: 184 cm (6 ft 0 in)
- Weight: 86 kg (190 lb)

Sport
- Sport: Field hockey
- Position: Goalkeeper
- Club: Mechelse (assistant)
Youth career
- Years: Team
- 1993–2007: Frankenthal
- 2007–2008: Dürkheimer HC
Senior career
Years	Team	Caps	Goals
2008–2009	Dürkheimer HC	-	-
2009–2012	Mannheimer HC	-	-
2012–2018	Harvestehuder THC	-	-
2018–2021	Dragons	-	-
2021–2024	Braxgata	-	-
2024–2025	Oranje-Rood	-	-
National team
Years	Team	Caps	Goals
2009–2010	Germany U21		-
2015–2019	Germany	58	(0)
2010–2018	Germany (indoor)	13	(0)
Coaching career
- 2025–present: Mechelse
Medal record
Representing Germany
Men's field hockey
Champions Trophy
Bronze medal – third place	2016 London
Junior World Cup
Gold medal – first place	2009 Johor Bahru–Singapore
EuroHockey Junior Championship
Bronze medal – third place	2010 Siemianowice Śląski
Men's indoor hockey
Indoor World Cup
Silver medal – second place	2018 Berlin
Bronze medal – third place	2015 Leipzig
EuroHockey Indoor Championship
Gold medal – first place	2016 Prague
- Updated on 13 January 2024

Tobias Walter is a German former field hockey player who played as a goalkeeper. He played a total of 58 matches for the German national team from 2015 to 2019.

== Club career ==
Walter started playing hockey at Frankenthal and in 2007 he switched to Dürkheimer HC, who he left in 2009 for Mannheimer HC. He moved to Harvestehude in 2012. After six seasons with Harvestehude, he moved to Belgium to play for Dragons in Brasschaat. After three seasons he left Dragons to play for Braxgata. In May 2024 it was announced he would join Oranje-Rood in the Netherlands from the 2024–25 season onwards to replace the leaving Pirmin Blaak.

== International career ==
Walter made his debut for the senior national team in March 2015 in a test match against Great Britain. In December 2018, he was nominated for the FIH Goalkeeper of the Year Award.
