= Adam Dixon (field hockey) =

English field hockey player (born 1986)

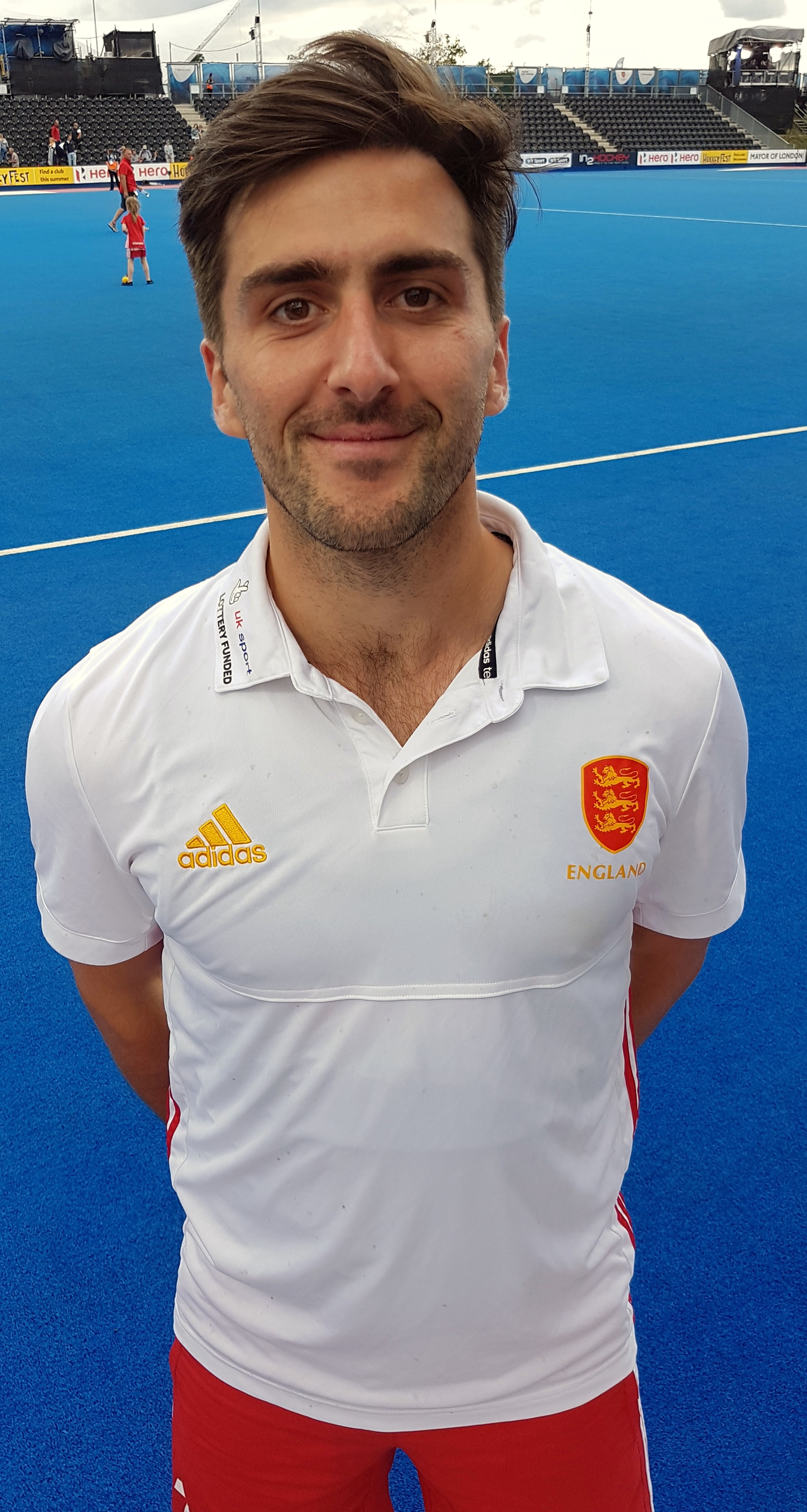

Personal information
- Born: 11 September 1986 (age 39) Nottingham, England
- Height: 1.69 m (5 ft 7 in)
- Weight: 70 kg (154 lb)

Sport
- Sport: Field hockey
- Position: Defender / Midfielder
Senior career
Years	Team	Caps	Goals
2002–2016	Beeston	-	-
2016–2017	Rotterdam	-	-
2017–2023	Beeston	-	-
2023–present	Repton	-	-
National team
Years	Team	Caps	Goals
2009–2021	England & GB	290	(22)
Medal record
Men's field hockey
Representing England
Champions Trophy
Silver medal – second place	2010 Mönchengladbach
EuroHockey Championship
Gold medal – first place	2009 Amstelveen
Bronze medal – third place	2011 Mönchengladbach
Bronze medal – third place	2017 Amstelveen
Commonwealth Games
Bronze medal – third place	2014 Glasgow	Team
Bronze medal – third place	2018 Gold Coast	Team
World League
Bronze medal – third place	2014 New Delhi	Team

Adam Graham Dixon (born 11 September 1986) is an English field hockey player who played as a defender/midfielder for the England and Great Britain national teams. He represented Great Britain at the 2016 Summer Olympics and 2020 Summer Olympics and captained both Great Britain and England.

== Biography ==
Dixon was born in Nottingham and grew up in Newark-on-Trent, where he played for Newark Hockey Club and went to school at Worksop College.

He played club hockey in the Men's England Hockey League Premier Division for Beeston from 2002 to 2016. While at Beeston, Dixon made his full international debut in May 2009 and played in the 2010 Commonwealth Games in Delhi. He was part of the silver medal winning England team that competed at the 2010 Men's Hockey Champions Trophy in Mönchengladbach, Germany.

He was named the 2013 Player of the Year by the Hockey Writers' Club. He competed for England at the 2014 Commonwealth Games where he won a bronze medal. In June 2016 he was selected for Great Britain to compete at the 2016 Olympic Games.

After 14 years with Beeston he played in Netherlands for HC Rotterdam for the 2016–2017 season before returning to Beeston in 2017. He won his 200th cap for England and GB on 21 August 2017 vs Germany and represented England at the 2018 Commonwealth Games in Gold Coast.

On 7 February 2019 it was announced that he had been appointed captain of England and GB. Dixon was selected to represent Great Britain squad for the delayed 2020 Olympic Games in Tokyo.

Dixon announced his retirement from playing International hockey after the Olympic Games in Tokyo.

In 2023, Dixon was appointed Director of Hockey at Repton School and subsequently played hockey for Repton Hockey Club.
