= Sukhi Panesar =

Canadian field hockey player

Personal information
- Full name: Sukhpal Singh Panesar
- Born: December 26, 1993 (age 32) Surrey, British Columbia, Canada
- Height: 1.80 m (5 ft 11 in)
- Weight: 75 kg (165 lb)

Sport
- Sport: Field hockey
- Position: Midfielder
- Club: Beeston
Senior career
Years	Team	Caps	Goals
2013–	Racing	-	-
2018–2020	Uhlenhorst Mülheim	-	-
2020–present	Beeston	-	-
National team
Years	Team	Caps	Goals
2010–present	Canada	151	(7)
Medal record
Men's field hockey
Representing Canada
Pan American Games
Silver medal – second place	2015 Toronto	Team
Silver medal – second place	2019 Lima	Team
Pan American Cup
Silver medal – second place	2013 Brampton
Silver medal – second place	2017 Lancaster
Bronze medal – third place	2022 Santiago
- Updated on 24 July 2021

Sukhpal Singh Panesar (born December 26, 1993) is a Canadian field hockey player who plays as a midfielder for English club Beeston and the Canadian national team.

== International career ==
He played for the Canada national field hockey team at the 2015 Pan American Games and won a silver medal. In 2016, he was named to Canada's Olympic team.

In June 2021, Panesar was named to Canada's 2020 Summer Olympics team.
