= Michael Robson =

Irish field hockey player (born 1995)

Personal information
- Born: 18 April 1995 (age 31) Belfast, Northern Ireland
- Height: 175 cm (5 ft 9 in)

Sport
- Sport: Field hockey
- Position: Midfield
Senior career
Years	Team	Caps	Goals
–	Annadale	-	-
2024–2026	Hampstead & Westminster	-	-
National team
Years	Team	Caps	Goals
2014	Ireland U–21	3	(0)
2014–	Ireland	145	(17)
Medal record
Men's field hockey
Representing Ireland
EuroHockey Championships
Bronze medal – third place	2015 London	Team
FIH Hockey Series
Silver medal – second place	2018–19 Le Touquet	Team
EuroHockey Championship II
Gold medal – first place	2023 Dublin	Team
Bronze medal – third place	2021 Gniezno	Team

Michael Robson (born 18 April 1995) is a field hockey player from Ireland.

== Life ==
Robson was born on 18 April 1995.

His younger brother, Callum, also plays international field hockey for Ireland.

== Field hockey ==
=== Domestic league ===
Robson currently competes in the Irish Hockey League, where he represents Annadale.

=== Under–21 ===
He made his debut for the Irish U–21 team in 2014 during a four-nations tournament in Belfast.

=== Senior national team ===
Robson made his senior international debut in 2014. He appeared in a test match against England in Reading.

Since his debut, Robson has been present at numerous international events and has medalled with the national team on four occasions. He took home gold at the 2023 EuroHockey Championship II in Dublin, silver at the 2018–19 FIH Series Finals in Le Touquet, and bronze at the 2015 EuroHockey Championship in London and the 2021 EuroHockey Championship II in Gniezno.

In 2016 he travelled to Rio de Janeiro as a reserve player for the Summer Olympic Games.

He competed at the 2024 FIH Olympic Qualifiers in Valencia.
