= David Carter (field hockey) =

Canadian field hockey player

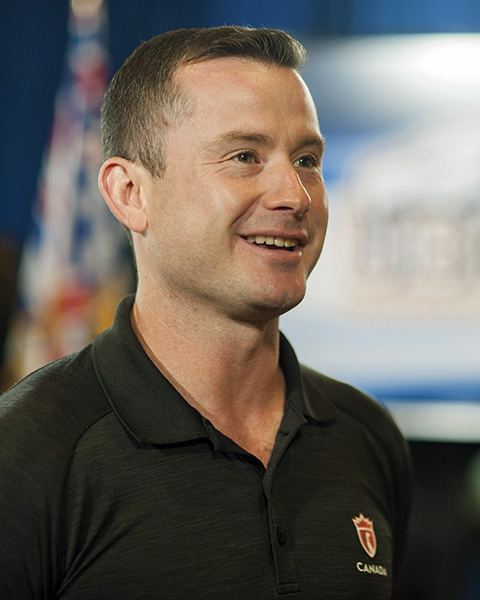

Personal information
- Born: November 4, 1981 (age 44) Vancouver, British Columbia
- Height: 1.75 m (5 ft 9 in)
- Weight: 79 kg (174 lb)

Sport
- Country: Canada
- Sport: Field hockey
Medal record
Pan American Games
Silver medal – second place	2011 Guadalajara	Team
Silver medal – second place	2015 Toronto	Team
Silver medal – second place	2019 Lima	Team
Pan American Cup
Silver medal – second place	2017 Lancaster

David Charles Michael Carter (born November 4, 1981) is a Canadian field hockey player who plays as a goalie for the Canada men's national field hockey team. He made his international debut on home soil against Chile in 2007 and registered a 1–1 draw. His first career win came at the Azlan Shah Cup Tournament in Malaysia against Belgium (4–3, extra-time) in 2008.

Carter retired with 195 international caps and has represented Canada at the 2009 Pan American Cup, 2010 World Cup, 2010 Commonwealth Games, and 2011 Pan American Games, and the 2016 Summer Olympic Games, alongside various other international competitions. After playing for the UBC Thunderbirds for 5 years, he currently plays for the United Brothers of the Vancouver Premier League.

Carter was selected Goaltender of the Tournament for the 2009 Pan American Cup, which qualified Canada for the 2010 World Cup to be held in New Delhi, India. He was also selected to the Pan American Elite Team in 2009. Instrumental in helping Canada qualify for the Rio Olympics in 2016, Carter was named both Player of the Tournament and Goalie of the Tournament at the World League Round 3 Event in Buenos Aires, Argentina.

At the event, Canada defeated New Zealand in a 14-round shootout after regulation time ended 0–0, where Carter was called upon to make multiple saves in the quarterfinal matchup. He then achieved a silver medal in the 2015 Pan American Games in Toronto and was nominated for FIH Goalie of the Year (he was again nominated in 2019). In 2015, he was named Field Hockey Canada Player of the Year and another selection to the Pan American Elite Team.

In 2016, he was named to Canada's Olympic team. In June 2019, he was selected in the Canada squad for the 2019 Pan American Games. They won the silver medal after losing 5–2 to Argentina in the finals.
