= Alastair Brogdon =

British and English field hockey player

Personal information
- Born: 10 November 1987 (age 39) Hale, Greater Manchester, England
- Height: 1.82 m (6 ft 0 in)
- Weight: 76 kg (168 lb)

Sport
- Sport: Field hockey
- Position: Forward
Senior career
Years	Team	Caps	Goals
2008–2012	Bowdon	-	-
2012–2013	Waterloo Ducks	-	-
2013–2016	Wimbledon	-	-
2016-2017	HC Rotterdam	-	-
2017–2019	Wimbledon	-	-
National team
Years	Team	Caps	Goals
–	England & GB	149	(23)
Medal record
Men's field hockey
Representing England
Champions Trophy
Silver medal – second place	2010 Mönchengladbach	Team
European Championship
Gold medal – first place	2009 Amsterdam	Team
Commonwealth Games
Bronze medal – third place	2014 Glasgow	Team
World League
Bronze medal – third place	2014 New Delhi	Team

Alastair Richard Brogdon (born 10 November 1987) is a British and English former field hockey player who competed at 2016 Summer Olympics in Rio.

== Biography ==
Brogdon was born in November 1987, in Hale, Manchester growing up in Bowdon, the youngest of three boys, both his older brothers, as well as his father and grandfather were hockey players.

Brogdon played club hockey in the Men's England Hockey League for Bowdon Hockey Club until 2012. While at Bowdon he made his international debut in 2009. He was part of the 2009 gold medal winning England side at the EuroHockey Championships and competed at the 2010 Commonwealth Games in Delhi. Brogdon was part of the silver medal winning England team that competed at the 2010 Men's Hockey Champions Trophy in Mönchengladbach, Germany.

After Bowdon he played club hockey for Waterloo Ducks and then Wimbledon Hockey Club, winning premier league titles with Wimbledon. Also while at Wimbledon, Brogdon received his 100th England cap against Argentina at the 2014 Champions Trophy, and competed for England in the men's hockey tournament at the 2014 Commonwealth Games in Glasgow, where he won a bronze medal.

Brogdon represented Great Britain at the 2016 Olympic Games in Rio de Janeiro. After the Olympics Brogdon played for HC Rotterdam and at the end of 2016, announced his international retirement.

After a final spell wth Wimbledon, Brogdon retired after the 2018/19 season and took positions coaching with Canterbury Hockey Club and as Director of Hockey at Kent College.

In July 2023, Brogdon alongside four team mates swam the English Channel as a relay in a time of 15hours 5minutes.
