= John-John Dohmen =

Belgian field hockey player

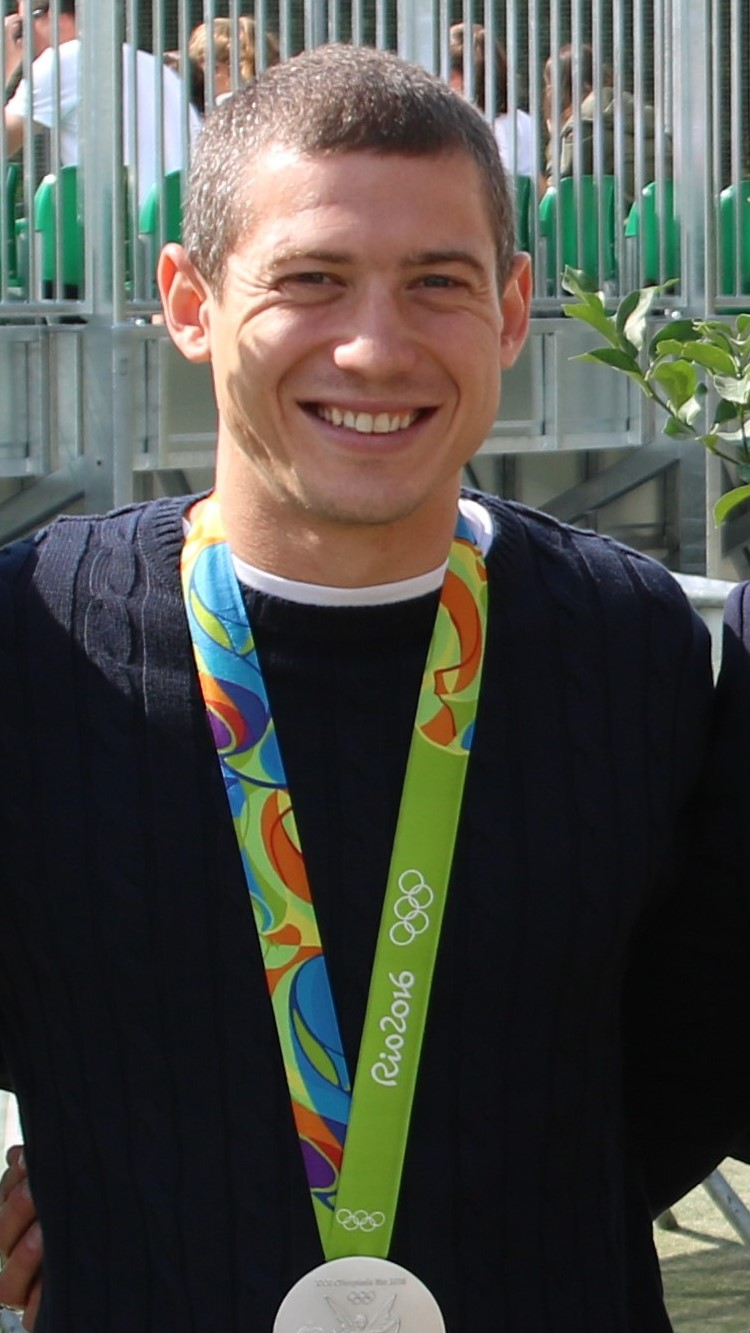
- Dohmen in 2016

Personal information
- Full name: John-John Dominique Dohmen
- Born: 24 January 1988 (age 38) Anderlecht, Belgium
- Height: 1.74 m (5 ft 9 in)
- Weight: 69 kg (152 lb)

Sport
- Sport: Field hockey
- Position: Midfielder
- Club: Orée
Youth career
- Team
- –: Léopold
Senior career
Years	Team	Caps	Goals
–	Léopold	-	-
–2020	Waterloo Ducks	-	-
2020–present	Orée	-	-
National team
Years	Team	Caps	Goals
2005–2024	Belgium	408	(63)
Medal record
Men's field hockey
Representing Belgium
Olympic Games
Gold medal – first place	2020 Tokyo	Team
Silver medal – second place	2016 Rio de Janeiro	Team
World Cup
Gold medal – first place	2018 Bhubaneswar
Silver medal – second place	2023 Bhubaneswar/Rourkela
EuroHockey Championship
Gold medal – first place	2019 Antwerp
Silver medal – second place	2013 Boom
Bronze medal – third place	2007 Manchester
Bronze medal – third place	2021 Amstelveen
Bronze medal – third place	2023 Mönchengladbach
Hockey World League
Silver medal – second place	2014–15 Raipur	Team

John-John Dominique Dohmen (born 24 January 1988) is a Belgian professional field hockey player who plays for Orée and the Belgium national team as a midfielder. He played 481 matches for the Belgium national team from 2005 until 2024.

== Biography ==
John-John Dohmen was born in Anderlecht in 1988, and spent his youth in Ittre.

He has graduated in ergotherapy. In 2014, he was a candidate for the Centre démocrate humaniste in the Belgian regional elections in Walloon Brabant.

Dohmen started playing hockey when he was five years old, and debuted at Royal Léopold Club in Uccle.

He was a player for the Waterloo Ducks until 2020, and since 2013, the captain of the Belgian national team (the "Red Lions"). He has won five national titles, one with Léopold and four with Waterloo. He was named Belgian hockey player of the year for the season 2008–2009. In the 2018–19 Euro Hockey League, Dohmen's Waterloo Ducks became the first Belgian club to win the Euro Hockey League.

=== International career ===
Dohmen debuted with the national team when he was only 16 years old, in a match against Italy. As of June 30, 2023, he had played 450 matches for the Red Lions.

He participated in his first Olympics at the 2008 Summer Olympics and the 2012 Summer Olympics. Dohmen became European vice-champion with Belgium at the 2013 European Championship on home ground in Boom. In August 2024 he announced after the quarterfinal loss in the 2024 Summer Olympics against Spain would be his last match with the national team.

=== Olympic silver medalist ===
In his third Olympics, Rio 2016, Dohmen led his team to the silver medal in the men's field hockey tournament.

=== World hockey player of the year ===
At the 2016 FIH Player of the Year Awards, the main awards given by the International Hockey Federation, Dohmen was crowned the 2016 FIH Player of the Year. He was previously nominated for the same award in 2013 and 2015.

== Awards ==
- 2009: Belgian hockey player of the year
- 2016: Officer in the Order of Walloon Merit
- 2017: FIH Player of the Year 2016 at the FIH Player of the Year Awards

Preceded by Robert van der Horst	FIH Player of the Year; 2016	Succeeded by Arthur Van Doren
