= Nicholas Catlin =

British field hockey player (born 1989)

Nick Catlin
Personal information
- Born: 8 April 1989 (age 37) Marlow, England
- Height: 1.75 m (5 ft 9 in)
- Weight: 76 kg (168 lb)

Sport
- Sport: Field hockey
- Position: Midfielder
Senior career
Years	Team	Caps	Goals
2007–2008	Reading	-	-
2008–2011	Loughborough	-	-
2011–2012	Reading	-	-
2012–2013	Racing Bruxelles	-	-
2013–2014	Reading	-	-
2014–2016	Holcombe	-	-
2016–2017	East Grinstead	-	-
2017–2018	Rotterdam	-	-
2018–2021	Beerschot	-	-
2022–2023	East Grinstead	-	-
2023–present	Henley	-	-
National team
Years	Team	Caps	Goals
2009–2016	England & GB	348	-
Medal record
Men's field hockey
Representing England
Commonwealth Games
Bronze medal – third place	2014 Glasgow	Team
Champions Trophy
Silver medal – second place	2010 Mönchengladbach
Hockey World League
Bronze medal – third place	2012–13 New Delhi	Team

Nicholas Andrew Catlin (born 8 April 1989) is an English field hockey player who plays as a midfielder. He competed at the 2012 Summer Olympics and 2016 Summer Olympics.

== Biography ==
Catlin is from Marlow, and attended John Hampden Grammar School.

Catlin started playing club hockey for Reading, initially as a junior and then senior in 2007. He joined Loughborough Students' the following season in 2008 and made his international debut in 2009 and played in the 2010 Commonwealth Games in Delhi. He was part of the silver medal winning England team that competed at the 2010 Men's Hockey Champions Trophy in Mönchengladbach, Germany.

He had two more spells with Reading, sandwiched by a season playing in Belgium. Catlin competed for the Great Britain national team at the 2012 Olympic Games and won a bronze medal with the England team at the 2014 Commonwealth Games, scoring a penalty in the shootout against New Zealand which decided the bronze medal match.

In September 2014, he switched to play for Holcombe before representing Great Britain at the 2016 Olympic Games in Rio de Janeiro. After the Olympics he joined East Grinstead. He also played for Racing Bruxelles in Belgium.

He joined Rotterdam in the Dutch Hoofdklasse in 2017 but after one season he left Rotterdam and he returned to Belgium to play for Beerschot.

Catlin returned to East Grinstead in 2022 and then moved to Henley Hockey Club.
