= David Condon (field hockey) =

English field hockey player (born 1991)

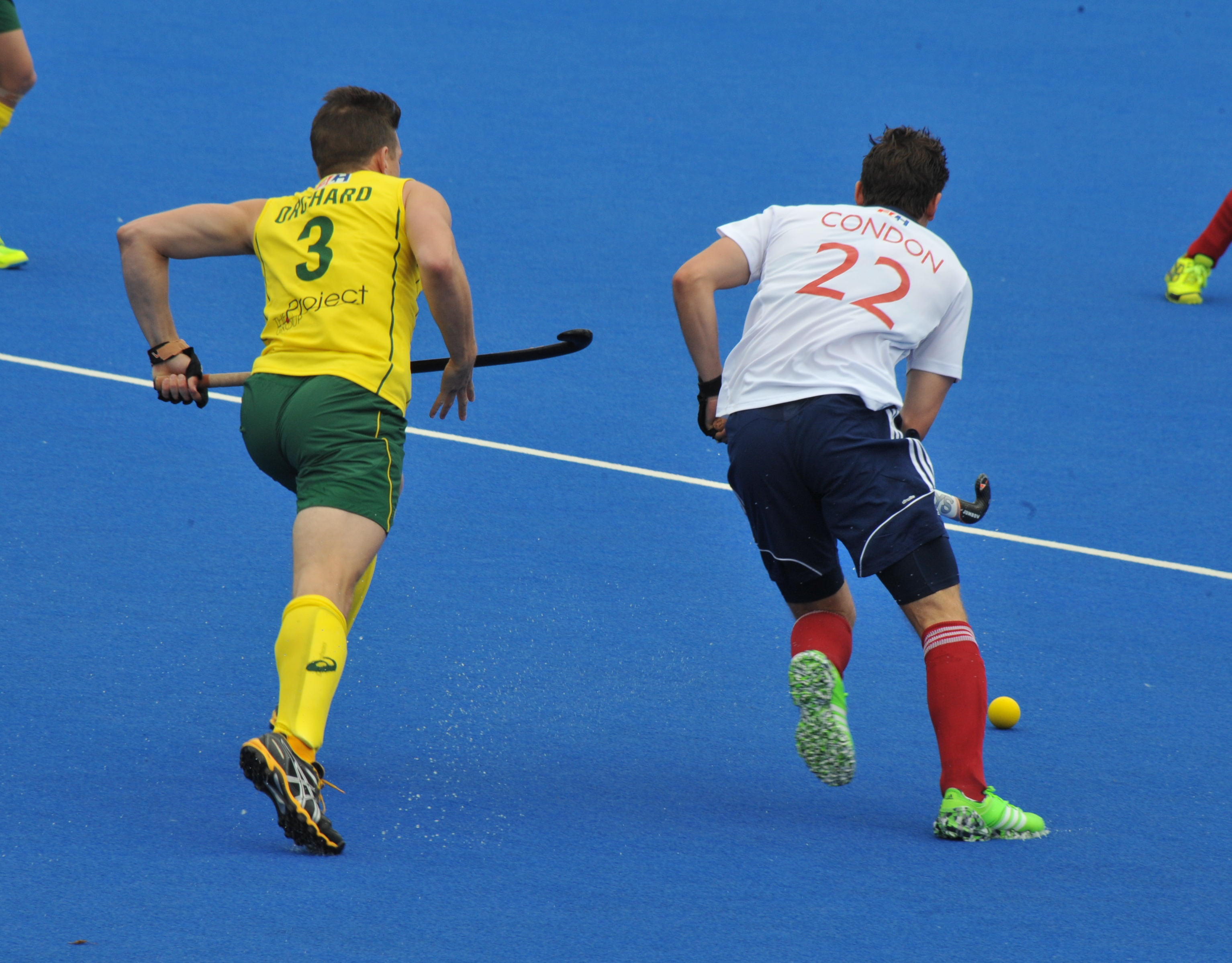

Personal information
- Born: 6 July 1991 (age 35) Leicester, England
- Height: 1.80 m (5 ft 11 in)
- Weight: 79 kg (174 lb)

Sport
- Sport: Field hockey
- Position: Midfielder/Forward
Senior career
Years	Team	Caps	Goals
2008-2013	Loughborough Students	-	-
2013-2020	East Grinstead	-	-
2020–2024	Wimbledon	-	-
2024–2026	Old Georgians	-	-
National team
Years	Team	Caps	Goals
2009-present	England & GB	183	(29)
Medal record
Commonwealth Games
Bronze medal – third place	2014 Glasgow	Team
Bronze medal – third place	2018 Gold Coast	Team
Bronze medal – third place	2022 Birmingham	Team
EuroHockey Championship
Silver medal – second place	2023 Mönchengladbach	Team
Bronze medal – third place	2017 Amstelveen	Team
World League
Bronze medal – third place	2014 New Delhi	Team

David John Condon (born 6 July 1991) is an English field hockey player who plays as a midfielder or forward for Old Georgians and the England and Great Britain national teams. He competed at the 2016 Summer Olympics.

== Biography ==
Condon joined East Grinstead from Loughborough Students in 2013 and competed for England in the men's hockey tournament at the 2014 Commonwealth Games where he won a bronze medal. He then represented Great Britain at the 2016 Olympic Games in Rio de Janeiro.

He also competed for England in the men's hockey tournament at the 2018 Commonwealth Games where he won another bronze medal.

He joined Wimbledon in the Men's England Hockey League Premier Division in 2020 after seven years with East Grinstead. It was while at Wimbledon that he won a third consecutive bronze medal with England in the Men's tournament at the 2022 Commonwealth Games in Birmingham and participated in the 2023 Men's FIH Hockey World Cup.

He transferred to Old Georgians for the 2024–25 Men's England Hockey League season. He won the 2026 Premier league title with Old Georgians.
