= Ronan Gormley =

Irish field hockey player (b. 1983)

Ronan Gormley (born 21 April 1983) is an Irish field hockey player. Originally from Cork, he played club hockey with Pembroke Wanderers in Dublin. He also played for a period with Crefelder HTC in Germany.

Gormley joined the Ireland men's national field hockey team squad in 2004, and earned his 200th cap in 2015. He was a member of the Irish team that won bronze at the 2015 Men's EuroHockey Championship, and later represented Ireland at the 2016 Summer Olympics. He earned his 250th cap for Ireland in February 2017, becoming one of the most capped players in Irish hockey.

After captaining Ireland over 120 times, he retired from international competition in September 2018.
