= Shane O'Donoghue (field hockey) =

Irish field hockey player (b. 1992)

Personal information
- Born: 24 November 1992 (age 33) Dublin, Ireland

Sport
- Sport: Field hockey
- Position: Midfield
- Club: Glennane
Senior career
Years	Team	Caps	Goals
–2011	Glennane	-	-
2011–2014	UCD	-	-
2014–2016	Dragons	-	-
2016–2018	Glennane	-	-
2018–2020	Dragons	-	-
2020–2024	Glennane	-	-
National team
Years	Team	Caps	Goals
2010–present	Ireland	190	(110)
Medal record
Men's field hockey
Representing Ireland
EuroHockey Championship
Bronze medal – third place	2015 London
- Updated on 30 June 2020

Shane O'Donoghue (born 24 November 1992) is an Irish field hockey player who is Ireland's record goal scorer with 110 goals to date. He is the player-coach for his boyhood club Glennane and plays in the midfield for both Glenanne and the Irish national team.

With the Irish national team, he competed at the 2016 Summer Olympics where he scored three goals. At the 2018 World Cup, O'Donoghue set the new record as career top goal scorer for Ireland, surpassing the 93 goals scored by John Jermyn; he has continued adding to the record, which he has increased to 110 goals.

== Club career ==
He played club hockey for KHC Dragons in Belgium, which he rejoined in 2018 after having played for them between 2014 and 2016. After the 2019–20 season he returned to Glennane in Ireland.
