= Alan Sothern =

Irish field hockey player

Personal information
- Born: 28 July 1987 (age 39) Shankill, Dublin, Ireland

Sport
- Sport: Field hockey
- Position: Forward
- Club: Pembroke Wanderers
Senior career
Years	Team	Caps	Goals
–2010	Pembroke Wanderers	-	-
2010–2011	Den Bosch	-	-
2011–2014	Pembroke Wanderers	-	-
2014–2016	Racing Bruxelles	-	-
2016–2018	Pembroke Wanderers	-	-
2018–2019	Gantoise	-	-
2019–present	Pembroke Wanderers	-	-
National team
Years	Team	Caps	Goals
2006–2018	Ireland	187	(74)
Medal record
Men's field hockey
Representing Ireland
EuroHockey Championships
Bronze medal – third place	2015 London
- Updated on 12 October 2020

Alan Sothern (born 28 July 1987) is an Irish field hockey player who plays as a forward for the Pembroke Wanderers.

He competed for the Ireland men's national field hockey team at the 2016 Summer Olympics.

== Club career ==
Alan Sothern won two Irish Hockey League titles with Pembroke Wanderers in 2009 and 2010, before he went abroad to play for HC Den Bosch in the Netherlands. He left Den Bosch after one season to return to Pembroke Wanderers. He played for Racing Club de Bruxelles and Pembroke Wanderers again before joining La Gantoise in 2018.
