= 2013 Hockey India League players' auction =

2013 Hockey India League Players' Auction was the auction of players for the first season of the franchise-based field hockey tournament, Hockey India League. Auction was conducted by International Auctioneer Bob Hayton and took place on 16 December at The Lalit Hotel in New Delhi.

A total of 246 players were available for the auction out of which 93 were foreign player and 153 local. Each franchise had a purse of US$ 650,000 to spend in the auction on 24 players (14 Indian and 10 overseas) for a term of 3 years. Minimum base price for an Indian player was US$ 2,800 and for overseas player was US$ 5,000 under which franchise owners could not bid.

== Marquee players ==
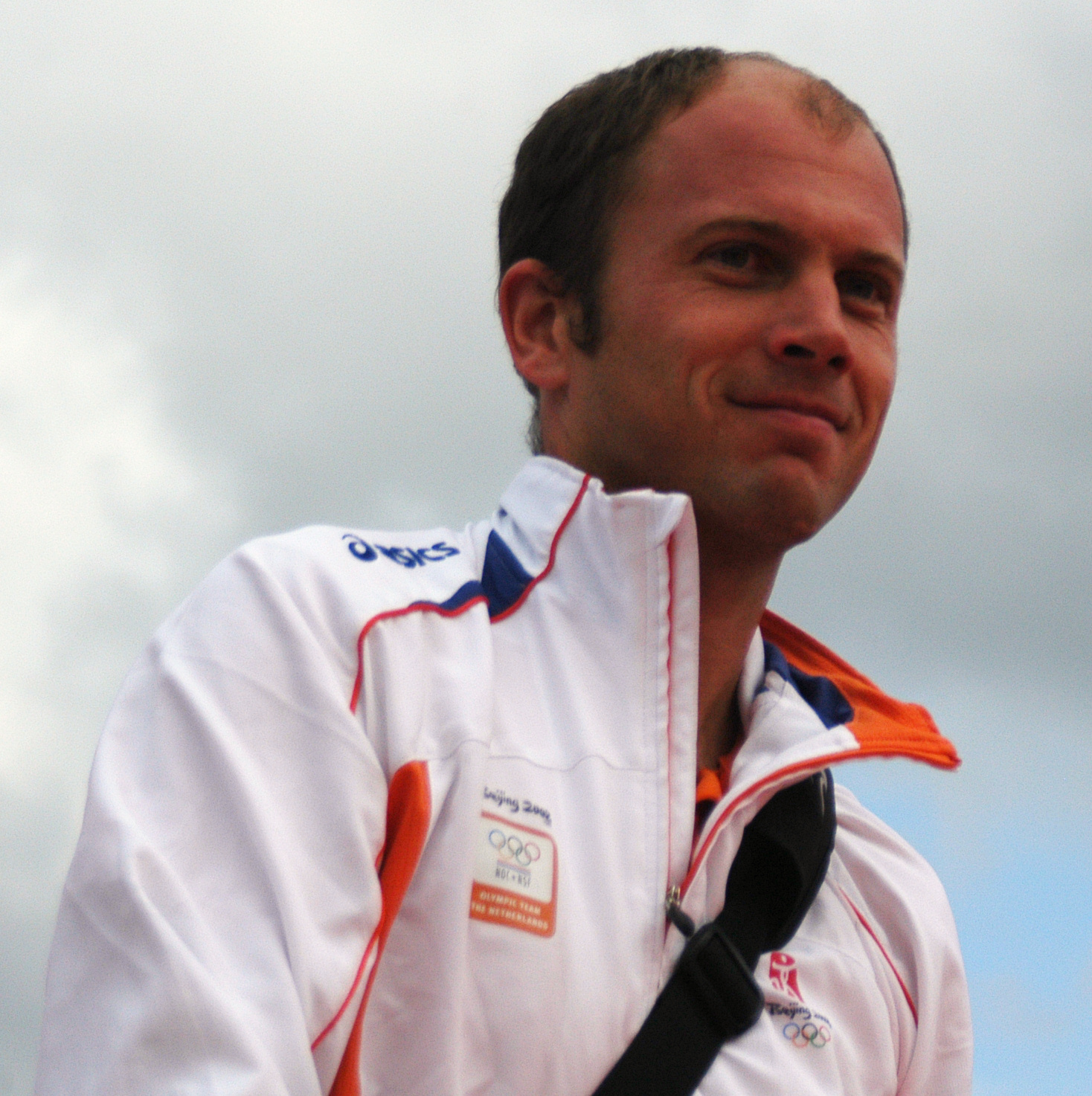
Teun de Nooijer (Uttar Pradesh Wizards) is the highest-paid player of the league.

The franchise owners made silent bids for each of the five marquee players before the actual auction begun. Hockey India then revealed which marquee player will lead which franchise based on the maximum bids by all the owners. Each team's marquee player got a contract worth at least 115 per cent of the highest successful bid for a player of that team in the auction if the silent bid is not worth more than this amount.

Marquee Players
Player	Team	Base Price	Winning Bid
(India) Sardar Singh	Delhi Wave Riders	$27,800	$78,000
(India) Sandeep Singh	Mumbai Magicians	$27,800	$64,400^{115%}
(Australia) Jamie Dwyer	Punjab Warriors	$25,000	$78,200^{115%}
(Germany) Moritz Fürste	Ranchi Rhinos	$25,000	$83,950^{115%}
(Netherlands) Teun de Nooijer	Uttar Pradesh Wizards	$25,000	$87,400^{115%}

^{115%} 115% of the top paid player of the team

Sandeep Singh was bought by Mumbai Magicians at his base price ($27,800) but Mumbai bought Australian Joel Carroll for $56,000 which raises Sandeep's annual purse to $64,400 due to the 115% rule. Similarly, Jamie Dwyer will fetch $78,200 (115% of Jaap Stockmann with $68,000) and Moritz Fürste will earn $83,950 (115% of Ashley Jackson's $73,000). Dutchman Teun de Nooijer's annual purse is the highest of the league i.e. $87,400 (115% of V.R. Raghunath's winning bid of $76,000) whereas Sardar Singh's annual purse is the highest among Indian players ($78,000).

== Auction ==
Each round of main auction involved bidding for 10 defenders, 10 forwards and 10 midfielders. 25 goalkeepers were auctioned all together in the first round.

Player	Team	Base Price	Winning Bid
(England) Ashley Jackson	Ranchi Rhinos	$25,000	$73,000
(Australia) Christopher Ciriello	Punjab Warriors	$25,000	$29,000
(Spain) David Alegre	Uttar Pradesh Wizards	$25,000	$55,000
(Netherlands) Floris Evers	Ranchi Rhinos	$25,000	$31,000
(Australia) Glenn Turner	Mumbai Magicians	$25,000	$25,000
(South Africa) Justin Reid-Ross	Ranchi Rhinos	$25,000	$33,000
(Germany) Oskar Deecke	Delhi Wave Riders	$25,000	$25,000
(Pakistan) Rashid Mehmood	Mumbai Magicians	$25,000	$41,000
(Netherlands) Taeke Taekema	Delhi Wave Riders	$25,000	$25,000
(Argentina) Lucas Rey	Punjab Warriors	$22,000	$40,500
(South Africa) Austin Smith	Ranchi Rhinos	$20,000	$46,000
(Australia) Edward Ockenden	Uttar Pradesh Wizards	$20,000	$65,000
(Spain) Francisco Juancosa Cortés	Ranchi Rhinos	$20,000	$42,000
(Netherlands) Jaap Stockmann	Punjab Warriors	$20,000	$68,000
(Netherlands) Jeroen Hertzberger	Uttar Pradesh Wizards	$20,000	$20,000
(Australia) Joel Carroll	Mumbai Magicians	$20,000	$56,000
(Australia) Kieran Govers	Punjab Warriors	$20,000	$41,000
(Australia) Luke Doerner	Uttar Pradesh Wizards	$20,000	$22,000
(Netherlands) Marcel Balkestein	Uttar Pradesh Wizards	$20,000	$20,000
(Australia) Mark Knowles	Punjab Warriors	$20,000	$57,000
(Australia) Matthew Butturini	Mumbai Magicians	$20,000	$31,000
(Australia) Matthew Gohdes	Delhi Wave Riders	$20,000	$32,000
(Australia) Matthew Swann	Mumbai Magicians	$20,000	$51,000
(Pakistan) Muhammad Rizwan Sr.	Delhi Wave Riders	$20,000	$26,000
(New Zealand) Nicholas Wilson	Ranchi Rhinos	$20,000	$24,000
(Netherlands) Pirmin Blaak	Delhi Wave Riders	$20,000	$33,000
(Australia) Robert Hammond	Punjab Warriors	$20,000	$25,000
(New Zealand) Simon Child	Delhi Wave Riders	$20,000	$20,000
(Australia) Simon Orchard	Punjab Warriors	$20,000	$45,000
(Netherlands) Wouter Jolie	Uttar Pradesh Wizards	$20,000	$53,000
(India) Gurbaj Singh	Delhi Wave Riders	$18,500	$36,000
(India) Shivendra Singh	Punjab Warriors	$18,500	$27,500
(Spain) Sergi Enrique	Mumbai Magicians	$18,000	$18,000
(Spain) Andrés Mir	Delhi Wave Riders	$15,000	$15,000
(Malaysia) Faizal Saari	Mumbai Magicians	$15,000	$26,000
(Pakistan) Fareed Ahmed	Mumbai Magicians	$15,000	$21,000
(Australia) George Bazeley	Uttar Pradesh Wizards	$15,000	$15,000
(Malaysia) Kumar Subramaniam	Uttar Pradesh Wizards	$15,000	$15,000
(South Africa) Lloyd Norris-Jones	Delhi Wave Riders	$15,000	$17,000
(Germany) Nicolas Jacobi	Delhi Wave Riders	$15,000	$50,000
(Netherlands) Sander Baart	Uttar Pradesh Wizards	$15,000	$24,000
(India) Danish Mujtaba	Delhi Wave Riders	$13,900	$63,000
(India) Gurwinder Singh Chandi	Delhi Wave Riders	$13,900	$50,000
(India) Ignace Tirkey	Punjab Warriors	$13,900	$31,000
(India) P. R. Shreejesh	Mumbai Magicians	$13,900	$38,000
(India) Sarvanjit Singh	Mumbai Magicians	$13,900	$29,000
(India) S.V. Sunil	Punjab Warriors	$13,900	$42,000
(India) Tushar Khandker	Uttar Pradesh Wizards	$13,900	$14,000
(India) V.R. Raghunath	Uttar Pradesh Wizards	$13,900	$76,000
(Pakistan) Muhammad Rizwan Jr.	Delhi Wave Riders	$10,000	$10,000
(Pakistan) Muhammad Tousiq	Mumbai Magicians	$10,000	$27,000
(Pakistan) Shafqat Rasool	Ranchi Rhinos	$10,000	$10,000
(India) Birendra Lakra	Ranchi Rhinos	$9,250	$41,000
(India) Dharamvir Singh	Punjab Warriors	$9,250	$52,000
(India) K. Chinglensana Singh	Mumbai Magicians	$9,250	$22,000
(India) Kothajit Singh	Ranchi Rhinos	$9,250	$33,000
(India) Manpreet Singh	Ranchi Rhinos	$9,250	$61,000
(India) Rupinder Pal Singh	Delhi Wave Riders	$9,250	$56,000
(India) S.K. Uthappa	Uttar Pradesh Wizards	$9,250	$25,000
(India) Yuvraj Valmiki	Delhi Wave Riders	$9,250	$18,500
(India) Akashdeep Singh	Delhi Wave Riders	$5,600	$17,000
(India) Amit Rohidas	Ranchi Rhinos	$5,600	$29,000
(India) Bipin Kishor Kerketta	Delhi Wave Riders	$5,600	$12,500
(India) Gurmail Singh	Punjab Warriors	$5,600	$33,000
(India) Harbir Singh	Uttar Pradesh Wizards	$5,600	$18,000
(India) M.B. Aiyappa	Mumbai Magicians	$5,600	$21,000
(India) Nitin Thimmaiah	Uttar Pradesh Wizards	$5,600	$27,500
(India) Prabhdeep Singh	Ranchi Rhinos	$5,600	$14,000
(India) Pradeep Mor	Uttar Pradesh Wizards	$5,600	$23,000
(India) Pradhan Somanna	Uttar Pradesh Wizards	$5,600	$14,000
(India) P.T. Rao	Mumbai Magicians	$5,600	$17,000
(Pakistan) Imran Butt	Mumbai Magicians	$5,000	$5,500
(Pakistan) Muhammad Irfan	Ranchi Rhinos	$5,000	$5,000
(Pakistan) Syed Kashif Shah	Punjab Warriors	$5,000	$9,500
(Spain) Roger Padrós	Punjab Warriors	$5,000	$5,000
(India) Malak Singh	Punjab Warriors	$4,650	$9,000
(India) Mandeep Singh	Ranchi Rhinos	$4,650	$13,000
(India) P.L. Thimmanna	Uttar Pradesh Wizards	$4,650	$25,000
(India) Sampath Kumar Maylaram	Mumbai Magicians	$4,650	$10,000
(India) Satbir Singh	Mumbai Magicians	$4,650	$45,000
(India) Sukhdev Singh	Punjab Warriors	$4,650	$5,500
(India) Anup Valmiki	Mumbai Magicians	$3,700	$3,700
(India) M. Gunasekar	Uttar Pradesh Wizards	$3,700	$3,700
(India) Ranjit Singh	Punjab Warriors	$3,700	$3,700
(India) Amon Mirash Tirkey	Ranchi Rhinos	$2,800	$6,500
(India) Arvind Kujur	Ranchi Rhinos	$2,800	$2,800
(India) Chandan Singh	Mumbai Magicians	$2,800	$7,500
(India) Gagandeep Singh	Mumbai Magicians	$2,800	$23,000
(India) Gaganpreet Singh	Punjab Warriors	$2,800	$2,800
(India) Gurinder Singh	Punjab Warriors	$2,800	$2,800
(India) Harjeet Singh	Uttar Pradesh Wizards	$2,800	$2,800
(India) Jarmanpreet Singh	Punjab Warriors	$2,800	$7,500
(India) Keshav Dutt	Punjab Warriors	$2,800	$2,800
(India) Nilakanta Sharma	Punjab Warriors	$2,800	$2,800
(India) Parvinder Singh	Ranchi Rhinos	$2,800	$2,800
(India) Rahul Shilpkar	Delhi Wave Riders	$2,800	$3,500
(India) Rocky Lohchab	Uttar Pradesh Wizards	$2,800	$14,000
(India) Siddharth Shanker	Uttar Pradesh Wizards	$2,800	$7,000
(India) Sreenivasa Rao Katharu	Uttar Pradesh Wizards	$2,800	$2,800
(India) Stanli Victor Minz	Ranchi Rhinos	$2,800	$7,000
(India) Sukhmanjit Singh	Ranchi Rhinos	$2,800	$21,000
(India) Surender Kumar	Delhi Wave Riders	$2,800	$2,800
(India) Sushant Tirkey	Ranchi Rhinos	$2,800	$13,000
(India) Suresh Toppo	Mumbai Magicians	$2,800	$2,800
(India) Talwinder Singh	Delhi Wave Riders	$2,800	$2,800
(India) Vikramjit Singh	Delhi Wave Riders	$2,800	$2,800
(India) Vivek Dhar	Uttar Pradesh Wizards	$2,800	$17,000

Player replaced.

=== 2nd round ===
After the main auction, the teams who had not completed their quota of 24 players (14 Indians and 10 overseas) could bid for the unsold players in the main auction.

Player	Team	Base Price	Winning Bid
(Australia) Fergus Kavanagh	Ranchi Rhinos	$25,000	$26,000
(India) Bharat Chettri	Punjab Warriors	$18,500	$19,000
(India) Hans Raj	Delhi Wave Riders	$2,800	$3,000
(India) Imran Khan	Delhi Wave Riders	$2,800	$3,000
(India) Jonny Jasrotia	Mumbai Magicians	$2,800	$3,000
(India) Sanjay Kumar Bir	Mumbai Magicians	$2,800	$3,000
(India) Sumit Topno	Ranchi Rhinos	$2,800	$3,000
(India) Vikas Choudhary	Ranchi Rhinos	$2,800	$3,000

== Replacement signings ==
Franchises can sign players after the HIL auction, as replacement of contracted players who are not available to play due to injuries and national commitments. Under HIL rules, the replacements have to be chosen from the pool of players who went unsold in the auction.

Player	Replaced	Team	Price	Reason for replacement
(Netherlands) Tim Jenniskens	(Netherlands) Taeke Taekema	Delhi Wave Riders	$20,000	Back injury
(India) Lovedeep Singh	(India) Rahul Shikpkar	Delhi Wave Riders	$2,800	Knee injury
(Australia) Liam de Young	(Spain) Sergi Enrique	Mumbai Magicians	$25,000	
(India) Khadangbam Rinel Singh	(India) Amon Mirash Tirkey	Ranchi Rhinos	$2,800	
(India) Tarandeep Singh	(India) Sukhmanjit Singh	Ranchi Rhinos	$2,800	
(Australia) Russell Ford	(Pakistan) Syed Kashif Shah	Punjab Warriors	$20,000	Player released
(New Zealand) Steven Edwards	(Pakistan) Rashid Mehmood	Mumbai Magicians	$20,000	Player released
(Australia) Jason Wilson	(Pakistan) Fareed Ahmed	Mumbai Magicians	$20,000	Player released
(Australia) Glenn Simpson	(Pakistan) Imran Butt	Mumbai Magicians	$15,000	Player released
(Australia) Tim Deavin	(Pakistan) Muhammad Tousiq	Mumbai Magicians	$15,000	Player released
(Spain) Bosco Pérez-Pla	(Pakistan) Muhammad Irfan	Ranchi Rhinos	$15,000	Player released
(New Zealand) Dean Couzins	(Pakistan) Muhammad Rizwan Jr.	Delhi Wave Riders	$25,000	Player released
(New Zealand) Andy Hayward	(Pakistan) Muhammad Rizwan Jr.	Delhi Wave Riders	$25,000	Player released

== Unsold players ==
Following unsold players were added to the reserve pool (according to their base price):

- $25,000
  - (Germany) Oliver Korn
  - (Pakistan) Muhammad Imran
  - (Spain) Ramón Alegre
  - (Spain) Pol Amat
- $20,000
  - (New Zealand) Phil Burrows
- $18,000
  - (Australia) Nathan Burgers
- $15,000
  - (Argentina) Juan Manuel Vivaldi
  - (Australia) Tristan Clemons
  - (France) Francois Scheefer
  - (Malaysia) Muhammad Razie
  - (Malaysia) Tengku Ahmad Tajuddin
  - (New Zealand) Hugo Inglis
  - (New Zealand) Shea McAleese
  - (Pakistan) Abdul Haseem Khan
  - (Pakistan) Muhammad Waqas
  - (Poland) Mirosław Juszczak
  - (South Africa) Clinton Panther
  - (South Africa) Erasmus Pieterse
  - (South Africa) Lloyd Madsen
  - (Spain) Xavier Trench
- $10,000
  - (Malaysia) Azlan Misron
  - (New Zealand) Hamish McGregor
  - (Pakistan) Imran Shah
  - (Pakistan) Muhammad Umar Bhutta
  - (Poland) Michal Nowakowski
  - (South Africa) Miguel Da Graca
  - (South Africa) Rhett Halkett
  - (South Africa) Thornton McDade
- $5,600
  - (India) Mucketira Gannapathy Poonacha
- $5,000
  - (Argentina) Pedro Budeisky
  - (Argentina) Tomas Kuhl
  - (Australia) Benjamin Read
  - (Pakistan) Ali Shan
  - (Spain) Oriol Fabregas
  - (Wales) Lewis Jon Valentine Prosser

- $2,800
  - (India) Anjum Tarik
  - (India) Dinesh Mann
  - (India) K. Laldintluanga
  - (India) Kalu Ram
  - (India) Keerthi Mallesh Gowda
  - (India) Nanak Singh
  - (India) Naveen Kumar
  - (India) Phirembam Bisham Singh
  - (India) R. Aravindan
  - (India) Shamsher Singh Kullar
  - (India) Subodh Tirkey
  - (India) Tariq Mohammad
  - (India) Tharun Thamanna Kalmadanda
  - (India) Abhijith B.
  - (India) Balin Boro
  - (India) Gaurav Chandrasen Bhonsle
  - (India) Birsu Bhengra
  - (India) Kabir Sharma
  - (India) R. Ashok Kumar
  - (India) Nadeem Uddin
  - (India) Mohan Muthanna Bollachanda
  - (India) Amit Kumar Malik
  - (India) Avtar Singh Mann
  - (India) Baljit Singh
  - (India) Captain Singh
  - (India) Deepak Aasanbhai Ramvani
  - (India) Dilbag Singh
  - (India) Suresh Kumar Ganeshan
  - (India) Gurpreet Singh Randhawa
  - (India) Jaskaran Singh
  - (India) Naocha Singh Konjengbam
  - (India) Laishram Laiba Loko
  - (India) Manish Bishnoi
  - (India) Prashant
  - (India) S. Paulsesu
  - (India) Saroj Barla
  - (India) Ramesh Setti
  - (India) Lowrance
  - (India) Kanchan Lochan Rajbhar
  - (India) Jatinder Singh
  - (India) Ratul Ansary
  - (India) Anil Xaxa
  - (India) S. Arumugam

- $2,800
  - (India) Prakash Singh Rawat
  - (India) K.D. Bidappa
  - (India) Dattesh Tulsidas Priolkar
  - (India) Deepak Kishor Ekka
  - (India) Harsahib Singh
  - (India) Keisham Hera
  - (India) Kiran Kumar Thockchom
  - (India) Joychandra Singh Lisham
  - (India) Lovepreet Singh Momi
  - (India) Manjinder Singh
  - (India) Manoj Singh Rawat
  - (India) Mohammed Riyazuddin
  - (India) Mikhail Barla
  - (India) Mohammed Iqbal Irshad Mirza
  - (India) Mohit Singh Thakur
  - (India) Muhammed Murthala P.K.
  - (India) Munish Rana
  - (India) N. Kamala Kannan
  - (India) Nitin Kumar Nandanoori
  - (India) Narad Dhaniram Bahadur
  - (India) Naveen Antil
  - (India) Ningombam Abung
  - (India) Dhamu Parthasarthy
  - (India) Pawan Singh Chauhan
  - (India) Prabhjot Singh
  - (India) Ravendra Shiv Kumar
  - (India) Rituraj Boro
  - (India) Sandeep Raju Sammeta
  - (India) Sanjeet Singh Chauhan
  - (India) Sarvjeet Singh Bhalru
  - (India) Sikander Pal Singh
  - (India) Vijay Indra Singh Thapa
  - (India) Vijay Thapa
  - (India) Vikas Choudhary
  - (India) Vinit Kamble
