= 2009 Men's Hockey Champions Trophy =

Tournament details
- Host country: Australia
- City: Melbourne
- Teams: 6
- Venue(s): State Netball and Hockey Centre, Parkville

Final positions
- Champions: Australia (10th title)
- Runner-up: Germany
- Third place: South Korea

Tournament statistics
- Matches played: 18
- Goals scored: 118 (6.56 per match)
- Top scorer(s): (Australia) Grant Schubert (Australia) Luke Doerner (6 goals)
- Best player: (Australia) Grant Schubert

The 2009 Men's Hockey Champions Trophy was the 31st edition of the Hockey Champions Trophy men's field hockey tournament. It was held from 28 November to 6 December 2009 in Melbourne, Australia.

== Teams ==
The International Hockey Federation announce the qualified teams for this event on 12 November 2008.

- Australia (host and defending champions)
- Germany (2008 Olympic champions and 2006 World Cup champions)
- Spain (Second in the 2008 Olympics)
- Netherlands (Fourth in the 2008 Olympics)
- England (Fifth in the 2008 Olympics as Great Britain)
- South Korea (Sixth in the 2008 Olympics)

== Results ==
All times are Eastern Daylight Time (UTC+11:00)

=== Preliminary round ===
| Team | Pld | W | D | L | GF | GA | GD | Pts |
|---|---|---|---|---|---|---|---|---|
| Australia | 5 | 4 | 0 | 1 | 24 | 9 | +15 | 12 |
| Germany | 5 | 3 | 0 | 2 | 17 | 16 | +1 | 9 |
| Netherlands | 5 | 3 | 0 | 2 | 13 | 16 | −3 | 9 |
| South Korea | 5 | 2 | 1 | 2 | 14 | 17 | −3 | 7 |
| England | 5 | 1 | 1 | 3 | 12 | 13 | −1 | 4 |
| Spain | 5 | 0 | 2 | 3 | 17 | 26 | −9 | 2 |

Source: FIH

==== Fixtures ====
28 November 2009
13:05

| Germany | 3–2 | England |
|---|---|---|
| Menke 10'; Montag 42'; Müller 67' | Report | Tindall 15'; Jackson 61' |

Umpires:
Simon Taylor (NZL)
Kim Hong-lae (KOR)

28 November 2009
15:05

| Australia | 4–0 | South Korea |
|---|---|---|
| Abbott 18'; Hammond 23'; Dwyer 39'; Ockenden 65' | Report |

Umpires:
John Wright (RSA)
Hamish Jamson (ENG)

28 November 2009
17:05

| Spain | 2–3 | Netherlands |
|---|---|---|
| Amat 58'; Ribas 61' | Report | Taekema 14', 50'; De Nooijer 16' |

Umpires:
Ged Curran (SCO)
David Gentles (AUS)

29 November 2009
13:05

| South Korea | 5–3 | Germany |
|---|---|---|
| You 4'; Seo 52', 64'; Nam 57'; Lee N. 63' | Report | Witthaus 32'; Montag 38', 70' |

Umpires:
Raghu Prasad (IND)
David Gentles (AUS)

29 November 2009
15:05

| Netherlands | 2–7 | Australia |
|---|---|---|
| Taekema 3'; Kemperman 68' | Report | Schubert 8', 33', 34'; Turner 19'; Dancer 22'; Doerner 51'; Dwyer 61' |

Umpires:
Ged Curren (SCO)
Hamish Jamson (ENG)

29 November 2009
17:05

| England | 3–3 | Spain |
|---|---|---|
| Tindall 2', 30'; Middleton 31' | Report | Ribas 7', 13'; Tubau 66' |

Umpires:
John Wright (RSA)
Bjorn Bachmann (GER)

1 December 2009
15:05

| Spain | 4–5 | Germany |
|---|---|---|
| Arbós 12'; Ribas 22'; Tubau 41'; Quemada 44' | Report | Weß 1'; Montag 6'; Fuchs 13', 61'; Witthaus 70' |

Umpires:
Kim Hong-lae (KOR)
Hamish Jamson (ENG)

1 December 2009
17:05

| Netherlands | 1–2 | South Korea |
|---|---|---|
| Weusthof 11' | Report | Hong 26'; Seo 68' |

Umpires:
Simon Taylor (NZL)
Bjorn Bachmann (GER)

1 December 2009
19:05

| Australia | 2–1 | England |
|---|---|---|
| Schubert 21'; Abbott 59' | Report | Mackay 13' |

Umpires:
Raghu Prasad (IND)
Ged Curran (SCO)

3 December 2009
15:05

| South Korea | 5–5 | Spain |
|---|---|---|
| Seo 12'; Nam 58', 61', 65'; You 67' | Report | Quemada 2', 5', 53'; Alegre 10'; Tubau 26' |

Umpires:
Hamish Jamson (ENG)
Raghu Prasad (IND)

3 December 2009
17:05

| England | 2–3 | Netherlands |
|---|---|---|
| Mantell 27'; Smith 59' | Report | Kemperman 4', 49'; Reckers 18' |

Umpires:
David Gentles (AUS)
Kim Hong-lae (KOR)

3 December 2009
19:05

| Germany | 3–1 | Australia |
|---|---|---|
| Montag 24'; Witthaus 27'; Wesley 31' | Report | Doerner 53' |

Umpires:
John Wright (RSA)
Simon Taylor (NZL)

5 December 2009
11:05

| England | 4–2 | South Korea |
|---|---|---|
| Wilson 24'; Alexander 41'; Catlin 50'; Mantell 69' | Report | Yoon 34'; Lee N. 58' |

Umpires:
Simon Taylor (NZL)
Bjorn Bachmann (GER)

5 December 2009
13:05

| Australia | 10–3 | Spain |
|---|---|---|
| Schubert 21', 39'; Doerner 35', 51'; Turner 54', 70'; Kavanagh 59', 63'; Dwyer 60'; Ockenden 68' | Report | Tubau 24'; Amat 26'; Alegre 43' |

Umpires:
Kim Hong-lae (KOR)
Ged Curran (SCO)

5 December 2009
15:05

| Netherlands | 4–3 | Germany |
|---|---|---|
| Taekema 4'; Reckers 24', 41'; De Nooijer 37' | Report | Witthaus 10'; Fuchs 14', 45' |

Umpires:
John Wright (RSA)
David Gentles (AUS)

=== Classification ===
==== Fifth and sixth place ====
6 December 2009
10:05

| England | 2–5 | Spain |
|---|---|---|
| Jackson 31', 61' | Report | Quemada 2'; Lleonart 27'; Tubau 34'; Ribas 48'; Amat 70' |

Umpires:
Raghu Prasad (IND)
Simon Taylor (NZL)

==== Third and fourth place ====
6 December 2009
12:35

| Netherlands | 2–4 | South Korea |
|---|---|---|
| Reckers 32'; Taekema 68' | Report | Seo 44'; Nam 58'; Lee N. 60'; You 69' |

Umpires:
Hamish Jamson (ENG)
David Gentles (AUS)

==== Final ====
6 December 2009
15:05

| Australia | 5–3 | Germany |
|---|---|---|
| Abbott 2'; De Young 37'; Doerner 41', 50'; Kavanagh 67' | Report | Fuchs 14'; Häner 22'; Witthaus 26' |

Umpires:
John Wright (RSA)
Ged Curran (SCO)

== Awards ==
| Top Goalscorers | Player of the Tournament | Goalkeeper of the Tournament | Fair Play |
|---|---|---|---|
| (Australia) Luke Doerner (Australia) Grant Schubert | (Australia) Grant Schubert | (South Korea) Lee Myung-Ho | Netherlands |

== Final standings ==
1. Australia
2. Germany
3. South Korea
4. Netherlands
5. Spain
6. England

== Goalscorers ==
There were 118 goals scored in 18 matches, for an average of 6.56 goals per match.

6 goals

- (Australia) Luke Doerner
- (Australia) Grant Schubert

5 goals

- (Germany) Florian Fuchs
- (Germany) Jan-Marco Montag
- (Germany) Matthias Witthaus
- (Netherlands) Taeke Taekema
- (South Korea) Nam Hyun-Woo
- (South Korea) Seo Jong-Ho
- (Spain) Pau Quemada
- (Spain) Xavier Ribas
- (Spain) Eduardo Tubau

4 goals

- (Netherlands) Robert Reckers

3 goals

- (Australia) Desmond Abbott
- (Australia) Jamie Dwyer
- (Australia) Fergus Kavanagh
- (Australia) Glenn Turner
- (England) Ashley Jackson
- (England) James Tindall
- (Netherlands) Robbert Kempermann
- (South Korea) You Hyo-Sik
- (South Korea) Lee Nam-Yong
- (Spain) Pol Amat

2 goals

- (Australia) Edward Ockenden
- (England) Richard Mantell
- (Netherlands) Teun de Nooijer
- (Spain) David Alegre

1 goal

- (Australia) Brett Dancer
- (Australia) Robert Hammond
- (Australia) Liam de Young
- (England) Richard Alexander
- (England) Nicholas Catlin
- (England) Iain Mackay
- (England) Barry Middleton
- (England) Richard Smith
- (England) Alastair Wilson
- (Germany) Martin Häner
- (Germany) Christoph Menke
- (Germany) Maximilian Müller
- (Germany) Christopher Wesley
- (Germany) Benjamin Weß
- (Netherlands) Roderick Weusthof
- (South Korea) Hong Eun-Seong
- (South Korea) Yoon Sung-Hoon
- (Spain) Eduard Arbós
- (Spain) Xavier Lleonart

Source: FIH
