= 2010 Men's Hockey Champions Trophy =

Field hockey tournament in Mönchengladbach, Germany

- official logo

Tournament details
- Host country: Germany
- City: Mönchengladbach
- Teams: 6
- Venue(s): Warsteiner HockeyPark

Final positions
- Champions: Australia (11th title)
- Runner-up: England
- Third place: Netherlands

Tournament statistics
- Matches played: 18
- Goals scored: 104 (5.78 per match)
- Top scorer(s): 7 Players (see list below) (5 goals)
- Best player: (Australia) Jamie Dwyer

The 2010 Men's Hockey Champions Trophy was the 32nd edition of the Hockey Champions Trophy men's field hockey tournament. It was held from July 31–August 8, 2010 in Mönchengladbach, Germany.

== Teams ==
Below is the teams released by the International Hockey Federation, based on criteria:

- Germany (host and 2008 Olympics gold medalist)
- Australia (Defending champion)
- New Zealand (Winner of Champions Challenge I)
- Netherlands (Third in 2010 World Cup)
- England (Fourth in 2010 World Cup)
- Spain (Fifth in 2010 World Cup)

== Squads ==
Australia

Head coach: Graham Reid

1. Jamie Dwyer (C)
3. Simon Orchard
4. Glenn Turner
5. Christopher Ciriello
7. Jason Wilson
10. Russell Ford
11. Edward Ockenden
13. Luke Doerner
15. Joel Carroll
19. Timothy Deavin
20. Matthew Swann
22. Nathan Burgers (GK)
24. Mark Paterson
26. George Bazeley (GK)
27. Kieran Govers
29. Graeme Begbie
31. Fergus Kavanagh
32. Desmond Abbott
England

Head coach: Bobby Crutchley

3. Nicholas Brothers (GK)
4. Glenn Kirkham (C)
5. Richard Alexander
7. Ashley Jackson
8. Simon Mantell
11. Alastair Brogdon
12. Jonathan Clarke
13. Robert Moore
14. Benjamin Hawes
16. Adam Dixon
17. Alastair Wilson
20. James Tindall
21. Iain Mackay
25. James Fair (GK)
26. Nicholas Catlin
27. Daniel Fox
29. Richard Smith
30. Andrew Bull
Germany

Head coach: Markus Weise

4. Maximilian Müller (C)
5. Florian Woesch
6. Martin Häner
7. Oskar Deecke
9. Moritz Fürste
10. Jan-Marco Montag
11. Christoph Menke
13. Tobias Hauke
15. Benjamin Weß
16. Pilt Arnold
17. Linus Butt
18. Oliver Korn
19. Christopher Zeller
20. Martin Zwicker
21. Johannes-Maximilian Weinhold (GK)
23. Florian Fuchs
24. Benedikt Fürk
25. Timothy Jessulat (GK)
Netherlands

Head coach: Paul van Ass

2. Jaap Stockmann (GK)
4. Klaas Vermeulen
5. Marcel Balkestein
6. Eby Kessing
7. Wouter Jolie
12. Robbert Kempermann
13. Mark Jenniskens (GK)
14. Teun de Nooijer
15. Alexander Baart
16. Floris Evers
20. Jeroen Hertzberger
22. Rogier Hofman (C)
24. Robert van der Horst
26. Valentin Verga
28. Billy Bakker
29. Jenniskens
30. Mink van der Weerden
31. Roderick Huber
New Zealand

Head coach: Darren Smith

4. Nicholas Haig
5. Andrew Hayward
6. Simon Child
7. Blair Hopping
8. Dean Couzins
9. Blair Hilton
10. Ryan Archibald
12. Bradley Shaw
15. Stephen Graham (GK)
17. Kyle Pontifex (GK)
18. Phil Burrows (C)
19. Hayden Shaw
22. Blair Tarrant
24. Arun Panchia
25. Shea McAleese
29. Hugo Inglis
31. Steven Edwards
32. Nicholas Wilson
Spain

Head coach: Daniel Martín

1. Francisco Cortés (GK)
2. Santiago Freixa (C)
3. Sergi Enrique
5. Bosco Pérez-Pla
7. Miguel Delas
8. Alexandre Fàbregas
11. Roc Oliva
12. Franc Dinares
13. Ramón Alegre
14. Gabriel Dabanch
15. Juan Lainz
19. Marc Salles
22. Manel Terraza
23. David Alegre
25. Pau Quemada
26. Andrés Mir
28. Xavier Lleonart
29. Oriol Fàbregas (GK)

== Results ==
All times are Central European Summer Time (UTC+02:00)

=== Pool ===
Pos	Team	Pld	W	D	L	GF	GA	GD	Pts	Qualification
1	Australia	5	5	0	0	24	8	+16	15	Final
2	England	5	2	1	2	15	16	−1	7	Final
3	Germany	5	2	0	3	12	11	+1	6	
4	Netherlands	5	2	0	3	13	15	−2	6	
5	Spain	5	1	2	2	13	17	−4	5	
6	New Zealand	5	1	1	3	13	23	−10	4	

Source: FIH
Rules for classification: 1) points; 2) goal difference; 3) goals scored; 4) head-to-head result.

31 July 2010
13:00

Germany	4–2	England
Deecke 5'; Montag 28'; Häner 32'; Weß 35+'	Report	Jackson 45', 65'

Umpires:
Roderick Wijsmuller (NED)
Deon Nel (RSA)

31 July 2010
15:00

Australia	9–1	New Zealand
Dwyer 3'; Doerner 26', 62'; Wilson 27', 54'; Orchard 31'; Turner 34'; Ford 59', 67'	Report	Wilson 33'

Umpires:
Ged Curran (SCO)
Francisco Vasquez Lopez (ESP)

31 July 2010
17:00

Netherlands	5–2	Spain
Hertzberger 10', 25'; Van der Weerden 31'; De Nooijer 33'; Hofman 55'	Report	Quemada 11'; Alegre 36'

Umpires:
Satinder Kumar (IND)
Bjorn Bachmann (GER)

1 August 2010
13:00

New Zealand	2–5	Germany
Wilson 46'; Child 65'	Report	Menke 19'; Woesch 22'; Häner 48'; Fuchs 53'; Fürste 67'

Umpires:
Francisco Vasquez Lopez (ESP)
Nathan Stagno (GIB)

1 August 2010
15:00

Netherlands	3–6	Australia
Hofman 42'; De Nooijer 48'; Van der Weerden 54'	Report	Dwyer 5', 67'; Doerner 45'; Abbott 63'; Wilson 64'; Ford 69'

Umpires:
Ged Curran (SCO)
Satinder Kumar (IND)

1 August 2010
17:00

Spain	3–3	England
Quemada 50'; Delas 54'; Dabanch 64'	Report	Kirkham 3'; Mackay 5', 54'

Umpires:
German Montes de Oca (ARG)
Nigel Iggo (NZL)

3 August 2010
16:00

Australia	3–2	England
Orchard 15'; Swann 17'; Doerner 32'	Report	Jackson 28'; Clarke 65'

Umpires:
Francisco Vasquez Lopez (ESP)
Roderick Wijsmuller (NED)

3 August 2010
18:00

New Zealand	3–1	Netherlands
Child 14'; Hayward 27'; Hilton 50'	Report	De Nooijer 48'

Umpires:
Deon Nel (RSA)
German Montes de Oca (ARG)

3 August 2010
20:00

Germany	2–3	Spain
Fuchs 63'; Zeller 69'	Report	Quemada 11', 41'; Oliva 64'

Umpires:
Nigel Iggo (NZL)
Nathan Stagno (GIB)

5 August 2010
16:00

Spain	4–4	New Zealand
D. Alegre 15'; Freixa 32'; Tarrant 56'; Delas 70+'	Report	Wilson 19'; Child 35+'; Burrows 45'; Edwards 55'

Umpires:
German Montes de Oca (ARG)
Roderick Wijsmuller (NED)

5 August 2010
18:00

England	4–3	Netherlands
Alexander 3', 63'; Mantell 18'; Clarke 57'	Report	Hofman 7'; Hertzberger 20'; Van der Weerden 29'

Umpires:
Bjorn Bachmann (GER)
Francisco Vasquez Lopez (ESP)

5 August 2010
20:00

Germany	1–3	Australia
Häner 23'	Report	Abbott 30', 47'; Dwyer 57'

Umpires:
Nigel Iggo (NZL)
Deon Nel (RSA)

7 August 2010
13:00

England	4–3	New Zealand
Tindall 1', 30'; Mantell 21'; Smith 69'	Report	Hayward 7', 41', 65'

Umpires:
Satinder Kumar (IND)
Nathan Stagno (GIB)

7 August 2010
15:00

Netherlands	1–0	Germany
Van der Weerden 8'	Report

Umpires:
Ged Curran (SCO)
German Montes de Oca (ARG)

7 August 2010
17:00

Australia	3–1	Spain
Wilson 30'; Ford 40'; Abbott 53'	Report	Quamada 35+'

Umpires:
Bjorn Bachmann (GER)
Roderick Wijsmuller (NED)

=== Classification ===
==== Fifth and sixth place ====
8 August 2010
10:00

Spain	3–2	New Zealand
Oliva 31', 42'; Freixa 39'	Report	Wilson 6'; Child 53'

Umpires:
Satinder Kumar (IND)
Roderick Wijsmuller (NED)

==== Third and fourth place ====
8 August 2010
12:30

Germany	1–4	Netherlands
Woesch 62'	Report	De Nooijer 7', 43'; Hofman 25'; Van der Weerden 49'

Umpires:
Nigel Iggo (NZL)
Nathan Stagno (GIB)

==== Final ====
8 August 2010
15:00

Australia	4–0	England
Doerner 6'; Abbott 7'; Wilson 14'; Dwyer 49'	Report

Umpires:
Ged Curran (SCO)
Deon Nel (RSA)

== Awards ==
Player of the Tournament	Goalkeeper of the Tournament	Most Promising Player	Fair Play Trophy
(Australia) Jamie Dwyer	(Netherlands) Jaap Stockmann	(Australia) Jason Wilson	Netherlands

== Statistics ==
=== Final standings ===
1. Australia
2. England
3. Netherlands
4. Germany
5. Spain
6. New Zealand

=== Goalscorers ===
There were 104 goals scored in 18 matches, for an average of 5.78 goals per match.

5 goals

- (Australia) Desmond Abbott
- (Australia) Luke Doerner
- (Australia) Jamie Dwyer
- (Australia) Jason Wilson
- (Netherlands) Teun de Nooijer
- (Netherlands) Mink van der Weerden
- (Spain) Pau Quemada

4 goals

- (Australia) Russell Ford
- (Netherlands) Rogier Hofman
- (New Zealand) Simon Child
- (New Zealand) Andrew Hayward
- (New Zealand) Nicholas Wilson
- (Spain) Roc Oliva

3 goals

- (England) Ashley Jackson
- (Germany) Martin Häner
- (Netherlands) Jeroen Hertzberger

2 goals

- (Australia) Simon Orchard
- (England) Richard Alexander
- (England) Jonathan Clarke
- (England) Iain Mackay
- (England) Simon Mantell
- (England) James Tindall
- (Germany) Florian Fuchs
- (Germany) Florian Woesch
- (Spain) Miguel Delas
- (Spain) Santiago Freixa

1 goal

- (Australia) Matthew Swann
- (Australia) Glenn Turner
- (England) Glenn Kirkham
- (England) Richard Smith
- (Germany) Oskar Deecke
- (Germany) Moritz Fürste
- (Germany) Christoph Menke
- (Germany) Jan-Marco Montag
- (Germany) Benjamin Weß
- (Germany) Christopher Zeller
- (New Zealand) Phil Burrows
- (New Zealand) Steven Edwards
- (New Zealand) Blair Hilton
- (Spain) David Alegre
- (Spain) Gabriel Dabanch
- (Spain) Manel Terraza

Source: FIH
