= 2013 Men's EuroHockey Championship =

Tournament details
- Host country: Belgium
- City: Boom
- Dates: 17–25 August
- Teams: 8 (from 1 confederation)
- Venue: Braxgata HC

Final positions
- Champions: Germany (8th title)
- Runner-up: Belgium
- Third place: Netherlands

Tournament statistics
- Matches played: 20
- Goals scored: 105 (5.25 per match)
- Top scorer: (Spain) Eduard Tubau (6 goals)
- Best player: (Netherlands) Robbert Kemperman
- Best goalkeeper: (Czech Republic) Filip Neusser

The 2013 Men's EuroHockey Championship was the 14th edition of the Men's EuroHockey Championship, the biennial international men's field hockey championship of Europe organized by the European Hockey Federation. It was held alongside the women's tournament from 17 until 25 August 2013 at Braxgata HC in Boom, Belgium. The main sponsor for the tournament was TriFinance.

The defending champions Germany defeated the hosts Belgium 3–1 in the final to win a record-extending eighth title and they earned their qualification to the 2014 World Cup. The Netherlands won the bronze medal as they defeated England 3–2.

== Qualified teams ==
Dates	Event	Location	Quotas	Qualifier(s)
Host			1	Belgium
20 – 28 August 2011	2011 EuroHockey Championship	Mönchengladbach, Germany	5	Germany; Netherlands; England; Ireland; Spain
8 – 14 August 2011	2011 EuroHockey Championship II	Vinnytsia, Ukraine	2	Czech Republic; Poland
Total			8	

== Format ==
The eight teams were split into two groups of four teams. The top two teams advanced to the semifinals to determine the winner in a knockout system. The bottom two teams played in a new group against the teams they did not play in the group stage. The last two teams were relegated to the EuroHockey Championship II.

== Preliminary round ==
The match schedule was released on 24 January 2013.

All times are local (UTC+2).

=== Pool A ===
Pos	Team	Pld	W	D	L	GF	GA	GD	Pts	Qualification
1	Belgium (H)	3	2	1	0	8	3	+5	7	Semi-finals
2	Germany	3	2	0	1	10	5	+5	6	Semi-finals
3	Spain	3	1	1	1	11	9	+2	4	Pool C
4	Czech Republic	3	0	0	3	1	13	−12	0	Pool C

Source: FIH
(H) Hosts

17 August 2013
16:00

Spain	6–1	Czech Republic
Delas 4'; Tubau 7', 60'; Quemada 29'; Oliva 55'; Casasayas 65'	Report	Procházka 16'

Umpires:
Dan Barstow (ENG)
Jonas van Hek (NED)

17 August 2013
20:00

Germany	1–2	Belgium
Grambusch 6'	Report	Boon 13', 15'

Umpires:
Jon Wright (RSA)
Geoff Conn (IRL)

19 August 2013
14:00

Spain	3–6	Germany
Quemada 13'; Terraza 28'; Dabanch 56'	Report	Stralkowski 18', 49'; Fürste 46'; Wesley 53'; Zwicker 54'; Korn 64'

Umpires:
Marcin Grochal (POL)
Martin Madden (SCO)

19 August 2013
18:00

Belgium	4–0	Czech Republic
Dohmen 5'; Boon 25'; 51'; Charlier 52'	Report

Umpires:
Jonas van Hek (NED)
Dan Barstow (ENG)

21 August 2013
16:00

Germany	3–0	Czech Republic
Grambusch 11'; Deecke 27'; Miltkau 42'	Report

Umpires:
Martin Madden (SCO)
Dan Barstow (ENG)

21 August 2013
18:00

Belgium	2–2	Spain
Boon 2'; Truyens 61'	Report	Quemada 49'; Tubau 63'

Umpires:
Marcin Grochal (POL)
Geoff Conn (IRL)

=== Pool B ===
Pos	Team	Pld	W	D	L	GF	GA	GD	Pts	Qualification
1	Netherlands	3	3	0	0	16	2	+14	9	Semi-finals
2	England	3	1	1	1	8	6	+2	4	Semi-finals
3	Ireland	3	1	1	1	7	6	+1	4	Pool C
4	Poland	3	0	0	3	4	21	−17	0	Pool C

Source: FIH

18 August 2013
10:00

England	5–2	Poland
Dixon 14'; Condon 44', 45'; Brogdon 63'; Carson 66'	Report	Górny 40'; Nowakowski 63'

Umpires:
Ben Göntgen (GER)
Gregory Uyttenhove (BEL)

18 August 2013
18:00

Netherlands	2–1	Ireland
Van der Weerden 31'; Kemperman 65'	Report	O'Donoghue 18'

Umpires:
Nathan Stagno (GIB)
Diego Estébanez (ESP)

19 August 2013
16:00

Ireland	4–2	Poland
Harte 6'; O'Donoghue 27'; Magee 45'; Watt 65'	Report	Chwalisz 10', 70'

Umpires:
John Wright (RSA)
Diego Estébanez (ESP)

19 August 2013
20:00

England	1–2	Netherlands
Middleton 54'	Report	Bakker 6'; Galema 24'

Umpires:
Nathan Stagno (GIB)
Gregory Uyttenhove (BEL)

21 August 2013
11:30

Ireland	2–2	England
O'Donoghue 51', 57'	Report	Carson 7', 19'

Umpires:
John Wright (RSA)
Nathan Stagno (GIB)

21 August 2013
20:00

Netherlands	12–0	Poland
Kemperman 11', 45', 48', 64'; Verga 40'; Jenniskens 43', 59'; Hertzberger 51'; Van Ass 52'; Jonker 56', 70+'; Bakker 69'	Report

Umpires:
Ben Göntgen (GER)
Diego Estébanez (ESP)

== Fifth to eighth place classification ==
The points obtained in the preliminary round against the other team were taken over.

=== Pool C ===
Pos	Team	Pld	W	D	L	GF	GA	GD	Pts	Relegation
5	Spain	3	3	0	0	14	2	+12	9	
6	Ireland	3	1	1	1	7	9	−2	4	
7	Poland (R)	3	1	0	2	7	9	−2	3	EuroHockey Championship II
8	Czech Republic (R)	3	0	1	2	5	13	−8	1	EuroHockey Championship II

Source: FIH
(R) Relegated

23 August 2013
14:00

Czech Republic	1–4	Poland
Bernátek 62'	Report	Zywiczka 4'; Kozlowski 21'; Rachwalski 24'; Makowski 30'

Umpires:
Dan Barstow (ENG)
Ben Göntgen (GER)

23 August 2013
16:00

Spain	4–0	Ireland
Lleonart 7'; Dabanch 19'; Tubau 37'; Mir 53'	Report

Umpires:
Jonas ven Hek (NED)
Gregory Uyttenhove (BEL)

25 August 2013
09:00

Spain	4–1	Poland
Quemada 25'; Tubau 35', 37'; Delas 61'	Report	Bratkowski 40'

Umpires:
Jonas ven Hek (NED)
Martin Madden (SCO)

25 August 2013
11:00

Ireland	3–3	Czech Republic
Harte 17'; Loughrey 58'; Jackson 61'	Report	Plochy 4'; Bernátek 12'; Vudmaska 51'

Umpires:
Gregory Uyttenhove (BEL)
Ben Göntgen (GER)

== First to fourth place classification ==
=== Bracket ===
Semi-finals
23 August
Belgium	3
England	0
23 August
Germany	5
Netherlands	3

Final
25 August
Belgium	1
Germany	3
Third place
25 August
England	2
Netherlands	3

=== Semi-finals ===
23 August 2013
18:00

Netherlands	3–5	Germany
Van der Weerden 19', 33'; Bakker 65'	Report	Hauke 30'; Stralkowski 44'; Grambusch 52', 60'; Deecke 70'

Umpires:
Nathan Stagno (GIB)
Geoff Conn (IRL)

23 August 2013
20:30

Belgium	3–0	England
Briels 20'; Truyens 44'; Van Aubel 52'	Report

Umpires:
Martin Madden (SCO)
Marcin Greochal (POL)

=== Third and fourth place ===
25 August 2013
13:30

Netherlands	3–2	England
Hertzberger 9', 39', 42'	Report	Lewers 15'; Smith 34'

Umpires:
Marcin Greochal (POL)
Diego Estébanez (ESP)

=== Final ===
25 August 2013
16:00

Germany	3–1	Belgium
Zwicker 42'; Weß 52'; Korn 63'	Report	Boon 38'

Umpires:
John Wright (RSA)
Nathan Stagno (GIB)

== Statistics ==
=== Final standings ===
Pos	Team	Qualification or relegation
1st place, gold medalist(s)	Germany	Qualification for the 2014 Hockey World Cup
2nd place, silver medalist(s)	Belgium (H)	
3rd place, bronze medalist(s)	Netherlands	
4	England	
5	Spain	
6	Ireland	
7	Poland (R)	Relegation to the Championship II
8	Czech Republic (R)	Relegation to the Championship II

Source: FIH
(H) Host; (R) Relegated

=== Awards ===
- Best Player of the Tournament: (Netherlands) Robbert Kemperman
- Best goalkeeper of the Tournament: (Czech Republic) Filip Neusser
- Topscorer of the Tournament: (Spain) Eduard Tubau

=== Goalscorers ===
There were 105 goals scored in 20 matches, for an average of 5.25 goals per match.

6 goals

- (Spain) Eduard Tubau

5 goals

- (Belgium) Tom Boon
- (Netherlands) Robbert Kemperman

4 goals

- (Germany) Mats Grambusch
- (Ireland) Shane O'Donoghue
- (Netherlands) Jeroen Hertzberger
- (Spain) Pau Quemada

3 goals

- (England) Tom Carson
- (Germany) Thilo Stralkowski
- (Netherlands) Billy Bakker
- (Netherlands) Mink van der Weerden

2 goals

- (Belgium) Jérôme Truyens
- (Czech Republic) Štepan Bernátek
- (England) David Condon
- (Germany) Oskar Deecke
- (Germany) Oliver Korn
- (Germany) Martin Zwicker
- (Ireland) Conor Harte
- (Netherlands) Tim Jenniskens
- (Netherlands) Constantijn Jonker
- (Poland) Adam Chwalisz
- (Spain) Gabriel Dabanch
- (Spain) Miguel Delas

1 goal

- (Belgium) Florent van Aubel
- (Belgium) Thomas Briels
- (Belgium) Cédric Charlier
- (Belgium) John-John Dohmen
- (Czech Republic) Lukas Plochý
- (Czech Republic) Tomas Procházka
- (Czech Republic) Ondrej Vudmaska
- (England) Alastair Brogdon
- (England) Adam Dixon
- (England) Iain Lewers
- (England) Barry Middleton
- (England) Richard Smith
- (Germany) Moritz Fürste
- (Germany) Tobias Hauke
- (Germany) Marco Miltkau
- (Germany) Christopher Wesley
- (Germany) Benjamin Wess
- (Ireland) John Jackson
- (Ireland) Stuart Loughrey
- (Ireland) Eugene Magee
- (Ireland) Michael Watt
- (Netherlands) Seve van Ass
- (Netherlands) Jelle Galema
- (Netherlands) Valentin Verga
- (Poland) Pawel Bratkowski
- (Poland) Tomasz Górny
- (Poland) Piotr Kozlowski
- (Poland) Krystian Makowski
- (Poland) Michal Nowakowski
- (Poland) Dariusz Rachwalski
- (Poland) Bartosz Zywiczka
- (Spain) Alex Casasayas
- (Spain) Xavi Lleonart
- (Spain) Andres Mir
- (Spain) Roc Oliva
- (Spain) Manel Terraza

1 own goal

- Czech Republic (against Belgium)

Source: FIH

== See also ==
- 2013 Men's EuroHockey Championship II
