= 2009 Champions Trophy (disambiguation) =

The 2009 Champions Trophy usually refers to the 2009 ICC Champions Trophy, a 10-team cricket tournament at various venues in India.

2009 Champions Trophy may also refer to:

- 2009 Men's Hockey Champions Trophy
- 2009 Women's Hockey Champions Trophy
