= 2012 Men's Hockey Champions Trophy =

International field hockey competition

- Official logo

Tournament details
- Host country: Australia
- City: Melbourne
- Teams: 8
- Venue: State Netball and Hockey Centre

Final positions
- Champions: Australia (13th title)
- Runner-up: Netherlands
- Third place: Pakistan

Tournament statistics
- Matches played: 24
- Goals scored: 103 (4.29 per match)
- Top scorer: (New Zealand) Nick Wilson (5 goals)
- Best player: (Pakistan) Shakeel Abbasi

The 2012 Men's Hockey Champions Trophy was the 34th edition of the Hockey Champions Trophy men's field hockey tournament. The tournament was held between 1–9 December 2012 in Melbourne, Australia.

Australia won the tournament for the thirteenth time after defeating the Netherlands 2–1 in the final, extending their record winning streak to five consecutive titles.

== Teams ==
Even though Spain was automatically qualified as the runner-up of the previous edition, they withdrew from participating due to financial issues. In addition to the three teams nominated by the FIH Executive Board to compete, the following eight teams, competed in this tournament.

- Australia (Host nation and defending champions)
- Netherlands (Third in 2011 Champions Trophy)
- New Zealand (Fourth in 2011 Champions Trophy)
- Germany (Fifth in 2011 Champions Trophy)
- Belgium (Winner of 2011 Champions Challenge I)
- England (Nominated by FIH Executive Board)
- India (Nominated by FIH Executive Board)
- Pakistan (Nominated by FIH Executive Board)

== Umpires ==
Below are the 10 umpires appointed by the International Hockey Federation:

- Richmond Attipoe (GHA)
- Diego Barbas (ARG)
- David Gentles (AUS)
- Andrew Kennedy (ENG)
- Martin Madden (SCO)
- Deon Nel (RSA)
- Raghu Prasad (IND)
- Haider Rasool (PAK)
- Simon Taylor (NZL)
- Paco Vázquez (ESP)

== Results ==
All times are Australia Eastern Daylight Time (UTC+11)

=== First round ===
==== Pool A ====
Pos	Team	Pld	W	D	L	GF	GA	GD	Pts	Qualification
1	India	3	2	0	1	9	6	+3	6	Quarterfinals
2	Germany	3	2	0	1	7	8	−1	6	Quarterfinals
3	England	3	1	1	1	6	5	+1	4	Quarterfinals
4	New Zealand	3	0	1	2	5	8	−3	1	Quarterfinals

Source: FIH
Rules for classification: 1) points; 2) goal difference; 3) goals scored; 4) head-to-head result.

1 December 2012
12:30

Germany	3–2	New Zealand
Matania 2'; Ruehr 21'; Korn 26'	Report	L'Huilier 56'; Wilson 66'

Umpires:
David Gentles (AUS)
Haider Rasool (PAK)

1 December 2012
16:30

England	1–3	India
Smith 15'	Report	Mujtaba 22'; Walmiki 38'; Chandi 66'

Umpires:
Martin Madden (SCO)
Richmond Attipoe (GHA)

2 December 2012
14:30

England	4–1	Germany
Dixon 6'; Martin 10'; 33'; Cheesman 61'	Report	14'

Umpires:
David Gentles (AUS)
Haider Rasool (PAK)

2 December 2012
18:30

New Zealand	2–4	India
4'; Wilson 38'	Report	10'; Chandi 14'; Raghunath 25'; Mujtaba 65'

Umpires:
Deon Nel (RSA)
Diego Barbas (ARG)

4 December 2012
13:30

New Zealand	1–1	England
Burrows 63'	Report	Gleghorne 11'

Umpires:
Haider Rasool (PAK)
Martin Madden (SCO)

4 December 2012
17:30

Germany	3–2	India
Korn 13'; Matania 56', 58'	Report	Chandi 5'; Thimmaiah 40'

Umpires:
Paco Vázquez (ESP)
Diego Barbas (ARG)

==== Pool B ====
Pos	Team	Pld	W	D	L	GF	GA	GD	Pts	Qualification
1	Netherlands	3	2	1	0	8	5	+3	7	Quarterfinals
2	Australia	3	2	1	0	5	2	+3	7	Quarterfinals
3	Pakistan	3	1	0	2	3	4	−1	3	Quarterfinals
4	Belgium	3	0	0	3	6	11	−5	0	Quarterfinals

Source: FIH
Rules for classification: 1) points; 2) goal difference; 3) goals scored; 4) head-to-head result.

1 December 2012
10:30

Netherlands	3–1	Pakistan
De Wijn 31', 45'; Hertzberger 56'	Report	Waqas 17'

Umpires:
Andrew Kennedy (ENG)
Diego Barbas (ARG)

1 December 2012
14:30

Australia	4–2	Belgium
Simpson 4'; Whetton 29'; Ford 37'; Ciriello 62'	Report	Dockier 38', 40'

Umpires:
Deon Nel (RSA)
Raghu Prasad (IND)

2 December 2012
12:30

Belgium	0–2	Pakistan
	Report	Khan 56'; Rasool 69'

Umpires:
Andrew Kennedy (ENG)
Richmond Attipoe (GHA)

2 December 2012
16:30

Netherlands	0–0	Australia
	Report

Umpires:
Simon Taylor (NZL)
Paco Vázquez (ESP)

4 December 2012
15:30

Belgium	4–5	Netherlands
Boon 36', 39'; Hendrickx 42'; Reckinger 70+'	Report	Hertzberger 25'; Caspers 29'; Jenniskens 35+'; Kempermann 41'; Verga 69'

Umpires:
Raghu Prasad (IND)
Andrew Kennedy (ENG)

4 December 2012
19:30

Australia	1−0	Pakistan
Govers 51'	Report

Umpires:
Simon Taylor (NZL)
Richmond Attipoe (GHA)

=== Second round ===
Quarterfinals
6 December 2012
India	1
Belgium	0
6 December 2012
Australia	2
England	0
6 December 2012
Germany	1
Pakistan	2
6 December 2012
Netherlands	2
New Zealand	0

Semi-finals
8 December 2012
India	0
Australia	3
8 December 2012
Pakistan	2
Netherlands	5

Final
9 December 2012
Australia (a.e.t)	2
Netherlands	1
Third place match
9 December 2012
India	2
Pakistan	3

==== Quarterfinals ====
6 December 2012
12:30

Germany	1−2	Pakistan
Fürste 9'	Report	Abbasi 39', 50'

Umpires:
Diego Barbas (ARG)
Paco Vázquez (ESP)

6 December 2012
15:00

Netherlands	2–0	New Zealand
Hertzberger 13'; Bakker 45'	Report

Umpires:
Haider Rassol (PAK)
Martin Madden (SCO)

6 December 2012
17:30

India	1–0	Belgium
Thimmaiah 13'	Report

Umpires:
David Gentles (AUS)
Deon Nel (RSA)

6 December 2012
20:00

Australia	2–0	England
Dwyer 16'; Ciriello 53'	Report

Umpires:
Simon Taylor (NZL)
Raghu Prasad (IND)

==== Fifth to eighth place classification ====
Crossover
8 December 2012
Belgium	4
England	0
8 December 2012
Germany	6
New Zealand	4

Fifth place match
9 December 2012
Belgium (a.e.t)	5
Germany	4
Seventh place match
9 December 2012
England	2
New Zealand (a.e.t)	3

===== Crossover =====
8 December 2012
08:30

Belgium	4–0	England
Truyens 27', 60'; Charlier 57'; Luypaert 70+'	Report

Umpires:
Raghu Prasad (IND)
Diego Barbas (ARG)

8 December 2012
11:00

Germany	6–4	New Zealand
Miltkau 40', 60'; Grambusch 43'; Matania 52'; Ruehr 61', 68'	Report	Burrows 7'; Wilson 20'; Jenness 51'; Haig 64'

Umpires:
Deon Nel (RSA)
Richmond Attipoe (GHA)

===== Seventh and eighth place =====
9 December 2012
08:30

England	2–3 (a.e.t.)	New Zealand
Cheesman 32'; Middleton 56'	Report	Jenness 19'; Wilson 61', 77'

Umpires:
Deon Nel (RSA)
Raghu Prasad (IND)

===== Fifth and sixth place =====
9 December 2012
11:00

Belgium	5–4 (a.e.t.)	Germany
Boon 10'; Dohmen 29'; Dockier 37', 74'; De Saedeleer 68'	Report	Schmidt 45'; Fürk 54'; Grambusch 60'; Polk 66'

Umpires:
Haider Rassol (PAK)
Andrew Kennedy (ENG)

==== First to fourth place classification ====
===== Semi-finals =====
8 December 2012
13:30

Pakistan	2–5	Netherlands
23'; Abbasi 70+'	Report	Bakker 2', 32'; Van Ass 20'; Verga 46'; Kempermann 61'

Umpires:
David Gentles (AUS)
Paco Vázquez (ESP)

8 December 2012
16:00

India	0–3	Australia
	Report	Dwyer 6', 18'; Govers 44'

Umpires:
Andrew Kennedy (ENG)
Martin Madden (SCO)

===== Third and fourth place =====
9 December 2012
13:30

India	2–3	Pakistan
Raghunath 7'; Rupinder Pal 70+'	Report	Rizwan Sr. 21'; Rasool 41'; Ateeq 67'

Umpires:
Diego Barbas (ARG)
David Gentles (AUS)

===== Final =====
9 December 2012
16:00

Australia	2–1 (a.e.t.)	Netherlands
Ford 31'; Govers 75'	Report	Baart 18'

Umpires:
Martin Madden (SCO)
Paco Vázquez (ESP)

== Awards ==
Top Goalscorer	Player of the Tournament	Goalkeeper of the Tournament	Fair Play Trophy
(New Zealand) Nick Wilson	(Pakistan) Shakeel Abbasi	(Netherlands) Jaap Stockmann	Netherlands

== Statistics ==
=== Final standings ===
1. Australia
2. Netherlands
3. Pakistan
4. India
5. Belgium
6. Germany
7. New Zealand
8. England

=== Goalscorers ===
There were 103 goals scored in 24 matches, for an average of 4.29 goals per match.

5 goals

- (New Zealand) Nick Wilson

4 goals

- (Belgium) Sébastien Dockier
- (Germany) Tobias Matania

3 goals

- (Australia) Jamie Dwyer
- (Australia) Kieran Govers
- (Belgium) Tom Boon
- (Germany) Christopher Rühr
- (India) Gurwinder Singh Chandi
- (Netherlands) Billy Bakker
- (Netherlands) Jeroen Hertzberger
- (Pakistan) Shakeel Abbasi

2 goals

- (Australia) Chris Ciriello
- (Australia) Russell Ford
- (Belgium) Jérôme Truyens
- (England) Darren Cheesman
- (Germany) Mats Grambusch
- (Germany) Oliver Korn
- (Germany) Marco Miltkau
- (India) Danish Mujtaba
- (India) V. R. Raghunath
- (India) Nithin Thimmaiah
- (Netherlands) Sander de Wijn
- (Netherlands) Robbert Kempermann
- (Netherlands) Valentin Verga
- (New Zealand) Phil Burrows
- (New Zealand) Stephen Jenness
- (Pakistan) Shafqat Rasool

1 goal

- (Australia) Glenn Simpson
- (Australia) Jacob Whetton
- (Belgium) Alexandre de Saedeleer
- (Belgium) John-John Dohmen
- (Belgium) Alexander Hendrickx
- (Belgium) Xavier Reckinger
- (Belgium) Cédric Charlier
- (Belgium) Loïck Luypaert
- (England) Adam Dixon
- (England) Mark Gleghorne
- (England) Harry Martin
- (England) Barry Middleton
- (England) Richard Smith
- (Germany) Benedikt Fürk
- (Germany) Moritz Fürste
- (Germany) Moritz Polk
- (Germany) Patrick Schmidt
- (India) Rupinder Pal Singh
- (India) Yuvraj Walmiki
- (Netherlands) Sander Baart
- (Netherlands) Quirjin Caspers
- (Netherlands) Tim Jenniskens
- (Netherlands) Seve van Ass
- (New Zealand) Nick Haig
- (New Zealand) Matt L'Huilier
- (Pakistan) Muhammad Ateeq
- (Pakistan) Abdul Haseem Khan
- (Pakistan) Muhammad Rizwan Sr.
- (Pakistan) Muhammad Waqas

1 own goal

- England (against Germany)
- Germany (against England)
- India (against New Zealand)
- New Zealand (against India)
- Pakistan (against the Netherlands)

Source: FIH
