= Alastair Wilson =

English field hockey player

Personal information
- Born: 19 December 1983 (age 42) Sheffield, England
- Height: 187 cm (6 ft 2 in)
- Weight: 86 kg (190 lb)

Sport
- Sport: Field hockey
- Position: Defender/Forward
Senior career
Years	Team	Caps	Goals
2007–2012	Beeston	-	-
National team
Years	Team	Caps	Goals
–	England & GB		-
Medal record
Men's field hockey
Representing England
Champions Trophy
Silver medal – second place	2010 Mönchengladbach	Team
European Championship
Gold medal – first place	2009 Amsterdam	Team
Bronze medal – third place	2011 Gladbach	Team

Alastair Wilson (born 19 December 1983) is a British field hockey player, he has competed in the European championship, as well as in the World Championship and in the 2008 Summer Olympics and 2012 Summer Olympics.

== Biography ==
Wilson graduated from Nottingham Trent University in business studies, in 2007. He played as a defender and a forward in field hockey, and he first played for England in January 2005 on a tour of South Africa, and has since played for England 45 times and for Great Britain over 20 times, including three appearances in the EuroHockey Nations Championship, and a part in the 2006 World Cup as substitute for Ben Marsden.

Wilson played club hockey for Beeston in the Men's England Hockey League and was selected for Great Britain at the 2008 Olympic Games in Beijing, where the team came fifth in the tournament and played in the 2010 Commonwealth Games in Delhi. He was part of the silver medal winning England team that competed at the 2010 Men's Hockey Champions Trophy in Mönchengladbach, Germany.

Still at Beeston, Wilson represented Great Britain at the 2012 Olympic Games in London. and at the 2012 Summer Olympics, where they came fourth, losing the bronze medal match to Australia.
