= Jeroen Hertzberger =

Dutch field hockey player

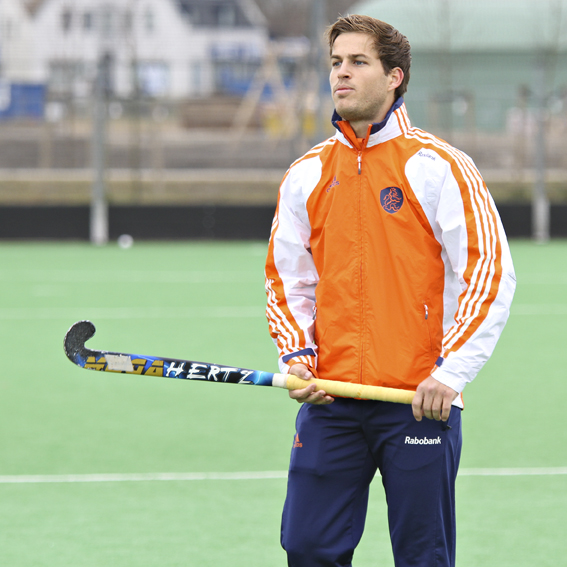

Personal information
- Born: 24 February 1986 (age 40) Rotterdam, Netherlands
- Height: 1.74 m (5 ft 9 in)
- Weight: 76 kg (168 lb)

Sport
- Sport: Field hockey
- Position: Forward
- Club: HC Rotterdam
National team
Years	Team	Caps	Goals
2007–	Netherlands	259	(90)
Medal record
World Cup
Silver medal – second place	2018 Bhubaneswar
Silver medal – second place	2014 The Hague
Bronze medal – third place	2010 New Delhi
European Championship
Gold medal – first place	2015 London
Gold medal – first place	2021 Amstelveen
Silver medal – second place	2011 Mönchengladbach
Bronze medal – third place	2009 Amstelveen
Bronze medal – third place	2013 Boom
Bronze medal – third place	2019 Antwerp
FIH Pro League
Bronze medal – third place	2019 Amstelveen
Champions Trophy
Silver medal – second place	2012 Melbourne
Bronze medal – third place	2007 Kuala Lumpur
Bronze medal – third place	2010 Mönchengladbach
Bronze medal – third place	2011 Auckland
Bronze medal – third place	2018 Breda
Hockey World League
Gold medal – first place	2012–13 New Delhi	Team
- Updated on 24 July 2021

Jeroen Hertzberger (born 24 February 1986) is a Dutch field hockey player who plays as a forward for Rotterdam and the Dutch national team.

Hertzberger was part of the Dutch national team for the 2007 Champions Trophy in Kuala Lumpur where the Dutch won the bronze medal. In 2008 they only finished in fourth place in Rotterdam. He also is part of the Dutch team that qualified for the 2008 Summer Olympics.

Hertzberger is the all-time top scorer in the Euro Hockey League competition with 26 goals. He scored the first hat-trick in 2018 Hockey World Cup against Malaysia.
