= Joel Carroll =

Australian field hockey player

Joel Caroll
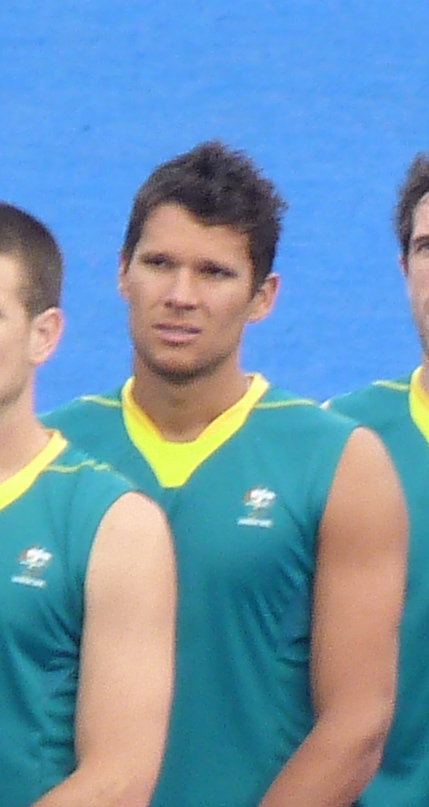
- Joel Carroll - 2012 Olympic field hockey team Australia

Personal information
- Full name: Joey
- Nickname: Joey Barroll
- Nationality: Australian
- Born: 1986 (age 39–40) Darwin, Northern Territory

Sport
- Country: Australia
- Sport: Field hockey
- Event: Men's team
Medal record
Men's field hockey
Representing Australia
Olympic Games
| Bronze medal – third place | 2012 London | Team |
Hockey at the Commonwealth Games
| Gold medal – first place | 2010 Delhi | Team |
Champions Trophy
| Gold medal – first place | 2010 Mönchengladbach | Team |
| Gold medal – first place | 2012 Melbourne | Team |

Joel Carroll (born September 1986 in Darwin, Northern Territory) is an Australian field hockey player. He played club field hockey for University team in the Darwin Hockey Association A-Grade league, and for the NT Stingers in the Australian Hockey League. He was a member of Australia's junior U21 team. He also represented Australia on the senior men's team, winning a gold medal with the side at the 2010 Commonwealth Games and the 2010 Men's Hockey Champions Trophy. He was part of the 2012 Olympic team that won the bronze medal.

== Personal ==
Carroll was born on 11 September 1986 in Darwin, Northern Territory. He is from the Northern Territory. His uncle is Joe Daby, one of the best ever Northern Territory field hockey players. He is recognized in the Australian Olympic Committee list of Australian Indigenous Olympians.

== Field hockey ==
Carroll is a defender, but he has played other positions including right-midfield in 2003, a position he preferred to play. In 2001 and 2002, he played A-Grade Hockey in the DHL League for perennial stalwarts Nightcliff Tigers Hockey Club, where his team won two premierships in both years. In 2002, as a fifteen-year-old, he played for the U18 and U21 Northern Territory teams in the national championships. In 2003, he was the youngest competitor in an Australian Hockey League between the NT Stingers and the NSW team, when he started for the NT Stingers in their season opener when he was 16 years old. He played for the team during the 2003 preseason. In January 2005, he was a member of Australia's U21 national team and played in a five-game test series against Malaysia in Brisbane. He was one of four Darwin, Northern Territory based players on the squad. In June 2005, he was one of five Northern Territory players to represent Australia on the U21 team at the World Cup.

=== National team ===
New national team coach Ric Charlesworth named Carroll and thirteen new players who had less than ten national team caps to the senior national squad before in April 2009 in a bid to ready the team for the 2010 Commonwealth Games. He made his national team debut in 2009. In 2010, he represented Australia at the Commonwealth Games, and played in the game against Pakistan during the group stage. He earned a gold medal at the Games. In 2010, he won a gold medal at the Champions Trophy. He did not compete at the Azlan Shah Cup in Malaysia in May 2011 because he was injured. In December 2011, he was named as one of twenty-eight players to be on the 2012 Summer Olympics Australian men's national training squad. He was one of two players from the Northern Territory named to the squad. This squad will be narrowed in June 2012. He trained with the team from 18 January to mid-March in Perth, Western Australia. In February during the training camp, he played in a four nations test series with the teams being the Kookaburras, Australia A Squad, the Netherlands and Argentina.

== Recognition ==
In 2009, Carroll was nominated for the Qantas NT Sportsperson of the Year. In 2012, he was a finalist for the Toll Transitions and Toll Marine Logistics Sports Award, an award presented by the Sun Newspapers.
