= Kashif Shah =

Pakistani field hockey player

Personal information
- Full name: Syed Kashif Shah
- Born: 24 October 1993 Pakistan

Sport
- Sport: Field hockey
- Position: Defender
National team
Years	Team	Caps	Goals
–	Pakistan	46	(0)

Kashif Shah
Medal record

Men's field hockey

Representing Pakistan

Champions Trophy
Bronze medal – third place	2012 Melbourne	Team

Asian Champions Trophy
Gold medal – first place	2012 Doha	
Gold medal – first place	2013 Kakamigahara	
Silver medal – second place	2011 Ordos City	

Syed Kashif Shah (born 24 October 1993) is a field hockey player from Pakistan.

== Career ==
=== 2012 ===
Shah was included in the squad for the 2012 Olympic Games in London, UK.

== See also ==
Pakistan national field hockey team
