= Jonty Clarke =

British field hockey player

Personal information
- Born: 28 January 1981 (age 45) Rochford, Essex, England
- Height: 183 cm (6 ft 0 in)
- Weight: 82 kg (181 lb)

Sport
- Sport: Field hockey
- Position: Forward
Senior career
Years	Team	Caps	Goals
2001–2003	University of Reading	-	-
2003–2017	Reading Hockey Club	-	-
National team
Years	Team	Caps	Goals
–	Great Britain	63	-
–	England	138	-
Medal record
Men's field hockey
Representing England
Champions Trophy
Silver medal – second place	2010 Mönchengladbach	Team
European Championship
Bronze medal – third place	2003 Barcelona	Team
Bronze medal – third place	2011 Mönchengladbach	Team

Jonathan Clarke (born 28 January 1981) is an English former field hockey player who played as a forward for England and Great Britain. He competed at the 2008 Summer Olympics and 2012 Summer Olympics.

== Biography ==
Clarke was born in Rochford, Essex and brought up in the town of Southend. He was educated at Southend High School for Boys and studied Economics at the University of Reading.

Clarke played club hockey for Reading Hockey Club in the Men's England Hockey League and while there he made his international debut against Belgium in February 2003. He represented England at the 2006 Commonwealth Games in Melbourne and represented Great Britain in Field hockey at the 2008 Summer Olympics in Beijing. SHSB said that they believed Jonty is the second pupil to ever represent Team GB at the Olympics after Mark Foster.

After his performance at the 2008 Olympics, Clarke became the first accountant to win the Echo's Southend Sports Personality of the Year. He attributed his success partly to his employer BDO, for which he works for on a part-time basis. He was part of the silver medal winning England team that competed at the 2010 Men's Hockey Champions Trophy in Mönchengladbach, Germany.

Still playing for Reading, Clarke went to his second Olympic Games, representing Great Britain at the 2012 Olympic Games in London.

He retired from hockey in 2017.
