= Richard Mantell =

British field hockey player

Rick Mantell
Personal information
- Born: 17 August 1981 (age 44) Bridgwater, Somerset, England
- Height: 189 cm (6 ft 2 in)
- Weight: 95 kg (209 lb)

Sport
- Sport: Field hockey
- Position: Forward
Senior career
Years	Team	Caps	Goals
2003–2018	Reading	-	-
National team
Years	Team	Caps	Goals
–	Great Britain	50	-
–	England	115	-
Medal record
Men's field hockey
Representing England
European Championship
Gold medal – first place	2009 Gladbach	Team
Bronze medal – third place	2011 Gladbach	Team

Richard Bryce Mantell (born 17 August 1981) is an English former field hockey defender who competed at the 2008 Summer Olympics. He is the older brother of Simon Mantell.

== Biography ==
Mantell was born in Bridgwater, Somerset, and studied at the University of Bath. He is nicknamed Rick or Ricky or Tricky. He has played club hockey for Reading in the Men's England Hockey League from 2003 to 2018.

Mantell made his international debut on 10 February 2003 and was a member of the England squad that competed at the 2006

After competing in the 2007 Men's Hockey Champions Trophy, he represented Great Britain at the 2008 Olympic Games in Beijing, competing in the men's tournament.

Mantell then competed in the 2009 Men's Hockey Champions Trophy and was also part of the winning squad at the 2009 EuroHockey Championship. he played in the 2010 Hockey World Cup and represented England at the 2010 Commonwealth Games in Delhi.

Mantell retired in 2018.
