= 2009 Men's EuroHockey Nations Championship =

Hockey tournament edition

2009 EuroHockey Nations Championship
EURO 2009
- Official logo

Tournament details
- Host country: Netherlands
- City: Amsterdam
- Dates: 22–30 August
- Teams: 8 (from 1 confederation)
- Venue: Wagener Stadium

Final positions
- Champions: England (1st title)
- Runner-up: Germany
- Third place: Netherlands

Tournament statistics
- Matches played: 20
- Goals scored: 115 (5.75 per match)
- Top scorer(s): (Netherlands) Taeke Taekema (Belgium) Jérôme Dekeyser (9 goals)

The 2009 Men's EuroHockey Nations Championship was the 12th edition of the EuroHockey Nations Championship, the biennial international men's field hockey championship of Europe organized by the European Hockey Federation. It was held in the Wagener Stadium in Amstelveen, Netherlands from 22 to 30 August 2009.

England won the tournament for the first time after defeating Germany 5–3 in the final. The hosts and defending champions the Netherlands secured third place after defeating Spain 6–1 in the third-place playoff.

== Qualified teams ==
Dates	Event	Location	Quotas	Qualifier(s)
Host			1	Netherlands
19–26 August	2007 EuroHockey Championship	Manchester, England	5	Spain; Belgium; Germany; England; France
9–12 September	2007 EuroHockey Nations Trophy	Lisbon, Portugal	2	Poland; Austria
Total			8	

== Results ==
All times are local, CEST (UTC+2).

=== Preliminary round ===
==== Pool A ====
Pos	Team	Pld	W	D	L	GF	GA	GD	Pts	Qualification
1	England	3	2	1	0	17	6	+11	7	Semi-finals
2	Germany	3	2	1	0	10	7	+3	7	Semi-finals
3	Belgium	3	1	0	2	7	11	−4	3	Pool C
4	Austria	3	0	0	3	1	11	−10	0	Pool C

23 August 2009
13:30

England	5–0	Austria
Jackson 12'; Middleton 44', 61'; Tindall 60'; Mackay 69'	Report

Umpires:
Pawel Linkowski (POL)
Marc Knülle (FRA)

23 August 2009
17:30

Germany	3–2	Belgium
Fürste 39', 66'; Deecke 53'	Report	Luycx 33'; Dekeyser 70'

Umpires:
Michiel Brüning (NED)
Francisco Vázquez López (ESP)

24 August 2009
15:30

Belgium	3–0	Austria
Dekeyser 29', 70'; Luycx 67'	Report

Umpires:
Marc Knülle (FRA)
Michiel Brüning (NED)

24 August 2009
17:30

Germany	4–4	England
Zeller 32', 59'; Fürste 36'; Wesley 68'	Report	Jackson 4'; Middleton 40', 43'; Mackay 52'

Umpires:
Francisco Vázquez López (ESP)
Tim Pullman (AUS)

26 August 2009
13:30

Belgium	2–8	England
Dekeyser 5'; Luycx 33'	Report	Jackson 17', 27', 37'; R. Mantell 23'; Clarke 30', 68'; Alexander 54'; Tindall 60'

Umpires:
John Wright (RSA)
Tim Pullman (AUS)

26 August 2009
15:30

Germany	3–1	Austria
Weß 27'; C. Zeller 59'; P. Zeller 59'	Report	Proksch 44'

Umpires:
Michiel Brüning (NED)
Pawel Linkowski (POL)

==== Pool B ====
Pos	Team	Pld	W	D	L	GF	GA	GD	Pts	Qualification
1	Spain	3	3	0	0	12	1	+11	9	Semi-finals
2	Netherlands (H)	3	2	0	1	15	3	+12	6	Semi-finals
3	France	3	1	0	2	3	11	−8	3	Pool C
4	Poland	3	0	0	3	3	18	−15	0	Pool C

(H) Hosts

22 August 2009
15:30

Netherlands	9–0	Poland
Taekema 16', 26', 63' de Nooijer 40'; Kemperman 50'; Hofman 54'; Hertzberger 60'; Brouwer 66', 68'	Report

Umpires:
Hamish Jamson (ENG)
John Wright (RSA)

22 August 2009
19:30

Spain	3–0	France
Tubau 23', 65'; Arbós 43'	Report

Umpires:
Colin Hutchinson (IRL)
Tim Pullman (AUS)

24 August 2009
13:30

Poland	2–3	France
Strykowski 34'; Dutkiewicz 68'	Report	Durchon 25', 42'; Jean-Jean 52'

Umpires:
Thomas Dumon (BEL)
John Wright (RSA)

24 August 2009
19:30

Netherlands	0–3	Spain
	Report	Tubau 4'; Amat 43'; Sojo 65'

Umpires:
Christian Blasch (GER)
Hamish Jamson (ENG)

26 August 2009
17:30

Spain	6–1	Poland
Enrique 8'; Sojo 29', 66'; Tubau 45'; Fàbregas 58'; Amat 62'	Report	Dutkiewicz 70'

Umpires:
Thomas Dumon (BEL)
Christian Blasch (GER)

26 August 2009
19:30

France	0–6	Netherlands
	Report	Taekema 12', 14', 54', 70'; Weusthof 34' de Nooijer 37'

Umpires:
Colin Hutchinson (IRL)
Hamish Jamson (ENG)

=== Fifth to eighth place classification ===
The points obtained in the preliminary round against the other team are taken over.

==== Pool C ====
Pos	Team	Pld	W	D	L	GF	GA	GD	Pts	Relegation
5	Belgium	3	3	0	0	15	0	+15	9	
6	France	3	2	0	1	6	11	−5	6	
7	Austria	3	1	0	2	7	10	−3	3	EuroHockey Championship II
8	Poland	3	0	0	3	6	13	−7	0	EuroHockey Championship II

28 August 2009
12:00

Austria	2–3	France
Körper 19'; Stanzl 68'	Report	Jean-Jean 5'; Becuwe 66'; Sevestre 70'

Umpires:
Michiel Brüning (NED)
Colin Hutchinson (IRL)

28 August 2009
14:00

Belgium	5–0	Poland
Briels 29'; De Saedeleer 45'; Dekeyser 54'; Charlier 56'; Thys 68'	Report

Umpires:
Francisco Vázquez López (ESP)
Marc Knülle (FRA)

30 August 2009
08:30

Austria	5–4	Poland
Jelinek 3'; Proksch 6'; Monghy 14'; Körper 31', 43'	Report	Dutkiewicz 24', 28', 32', 53'

Umpires:
Thomas Dumon (BEL)
Marc Knülle (FRA)

30 August 2009
10:30

Belgium	7–0	France
Dekeyser 1', 15', 50', 66'; De Saedeleer 46'; Thys 48'; Briels 58'	Report

Umpires:
Pawel Linkowski (POL)
Francisco Vázquez López (ESP)

=== First to fourth place classification ===
Semi-finals
28 August
England (a.e.t.)	2
Netherlands	1
28 August
Germany	2
Spain	1

Final
30 August
England	5
Germany	3
Third place
30 August
Netherlands	6
Spain	1

==== Semi-finals ====
28 August 2009
16:00

England	2–1 (a.e.t.)	Netherlands
Tindall 22'; Jackson 87'	Report	Taekema 49'

Umpires:
Christian Blasch (GER)
John Wright (RSA)

28 August 2009
19:00

Germany	2–1	Spain
Menke 48'; Zeller 61'	Report	Tubau 58'

Umpires:
Tim Pullman (AUS)
Hamish Jamson (ENG)

==== Third and fourth place ====
30 August 2009
13:00

Netherlands	6–1	Spain
Weusthof 18', 24'; Kemperman 54'; Hertzberger 63'; Brouwer 65'; Taekema 69'	Report	Garza 26'

Umpires:
Colin Hutchinson (IRL)
Christian Blasch (GER)

==== Final ====
30 August 2009
15:30

England	5–3	Germany
Jackson 9', 62'; Middleton 14'; R. Mantell 54', 57'	Report	Zeller 10', 26'; Montag 31'

Umpires:
Tim Pullman (AUS)
John Wright (RSA)

== Final standings ==
Rank	Team
Gold medal	England
Silver medal	Germany
Bronze medal	Netherlands
4	Spain
5	Belgium
6	France
7	Austria
8	Poland

Qualified for the 2010 World Cup

Relegated to the EuroHockey Championship II

== See also ==
- 2009 Men's EuroHockey Nations Trophy
- 2009 Women's EuroHockey Nations Championship
