= Maximilian Müller =

German field hockey player

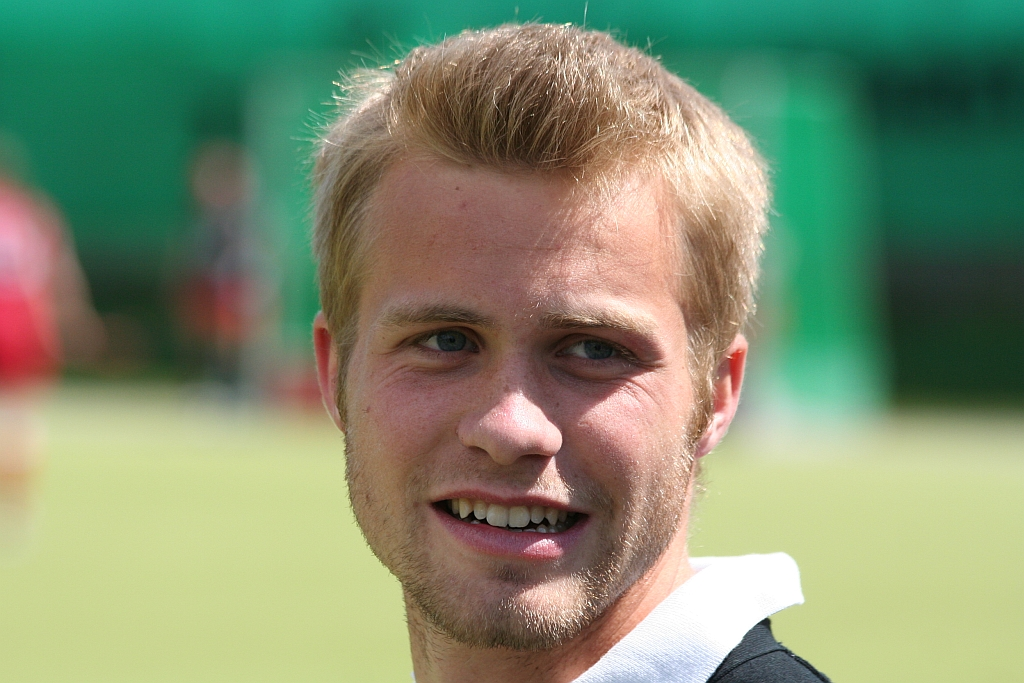

Medal record

Men's field hockey

Representing Germany

Olympic Games
Gold medal – first place	2008 Beijing	Team
Gold medal – first place	2012 London	Team

European Championship
Gold medal – first place	2011 Gladbach	Team

Champions Trophy
Gold medal – first place	2007 Kuala Lumpur	Team

Maximilian Müller (born 11 July 1987) is a field hockey player from Germany. Born in Nuremberg, he was a member of the men's national teams that won the gold medal at the 2008 and 2012 Summer Olympics. He is now captain of the German team.

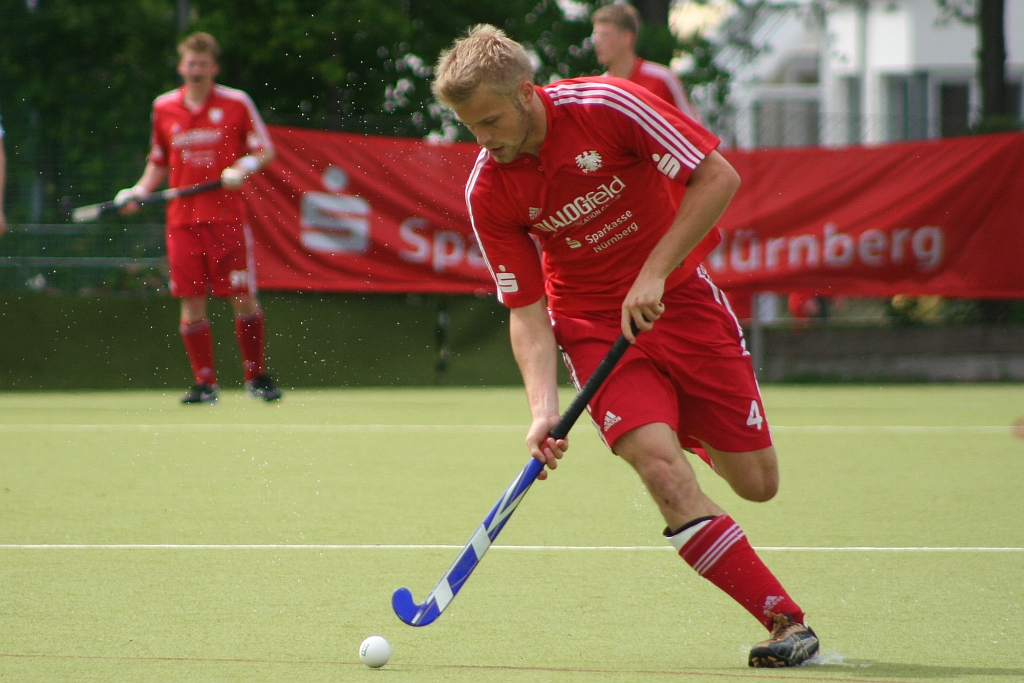
Müller in action.
