= Richard Alexander (field hockey) =

British field hockey player

Personal information
- Born: 15 September 1981 (age 44) Homersfield, Suffolk, England
- Height: 168 cm (5 ft 6 in)
- Weight: 80 kg (176 lb)

Sport
- Sport: Field hockey
- Position: Utility
Senior career
Years	Team	Caps	Goals
2000–2004	Loughborough Students	-	-
2005–2012	Surbiton	-	-
2012–2014	Wimbledon	-	-
2014–2017	Hampstead & Westminster	-	-
2018–2019	Richmond	-	-
2020–2021	Indian Gymkhana	-	-
National team
Years	Team	Caps	Goals
–	GB	58	-
–	England	130	-
Medal record
Men's field hockey
Representing England
Champions Trophy
Silver medal – second place	2010 Mönchengladbach	Team
European Championship
Gold medal – first place	2009 Amsterdam	Team
Bronze medal – third place	2011 Mönchengladbach	Team

Richard Ian M. Alexander (born 15 September 1981) is an English former field hockey player who competed at the 2008 Summer Olympics.

== Biography ==
Alexander was born in Homersfield, Suffolk, England and was educated at Town Close School.

Alexander made his international senior debut for the national squad in January 2005 against South Africa.

Alexander played club hockey for Surbiton and while at the club represented England at the 2006 Commonwealth Games in Melbourne and represented Great Britain at the 2008 Summer Olympics in Beijing and England at the 2010 Commonwealth Games in Delhi.

Alexander was part of the silver medal winning England team that competed at the 2010 Men's Hockey Champions Trophy in Mönchengladbach, Germany.

Alexander joined Wimbledon for the 2012/13 season and then moved on to Hampstead & Westminster for the 2014/15 season.

For the 2020/21 season he played club hockey for Indian Gymkhana in the South Hockey League Premier Division 1. In 2010, he was the Director of Hockey at Old Merchant Taylors' HC.

Alexander retired from international hockey with 130 England caps and 58 Great Britain caps. He is a teacher at Nottingham High School.
