= Alexandre De Saedeleer =

Belgian field hockey player

Alexandre De Saedeleer (14 November 1987, Etterbeek) is a Belgian international field hockey player. At the 2012 Summer Olympics, he competed for the national team in the men's tournament. De Saedeleer won the silver medal with Belgium at the 2013 European Championship on home ground in Boom.
