= Taeke Taekema =

Dutch field hockey player

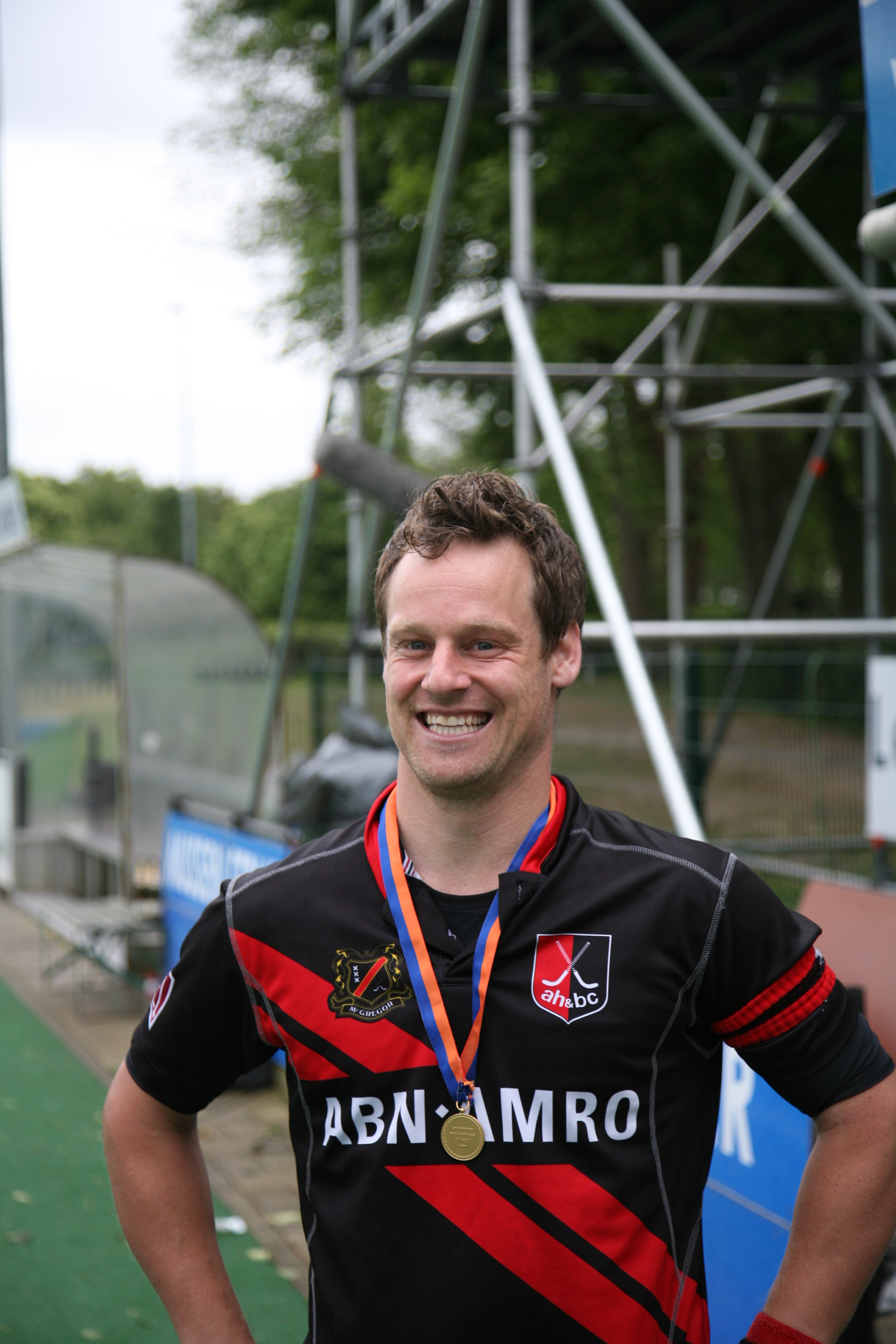

Personal information
- Full name: Taeke Wiebe Doekes Taekema
- Born: 14 January 1980 (age 46) Leiderdorp, Netherlands

Sport
- Sport: Field hockey
- Position: Defender, midfielder
Senior career
Years	Team	Caps	Goals
–	LOHC	-	-
–2005	Klein Zwitserland	-	-
2005–2013	Amsterdam	-	-
2013–2014	Schaerweijde	-	-
National team
Years	Team	Caps	Goals
2000–2011	Netherlands	242	(221)
Medal record
Men's field hockey
Representing the Netherlands
Olympic Games
Silver medal – second place	2004 Athens	Team
World Cup
Bronze medal – third place	2002 Kuala Lumpur	Team
Bronze medal – third place	2010 New Delhi	Team
EuroHockey Championship
Gold medal – first place	2007 Manchester	Team
Silver medal – second place	2005 Leipzig	Team
Silver medal – second place	2011 Gladbach	Team
Champions Trophy
Gold medal – first place	2000 Amstelveen	Team
Gold medal – first place	2002 Cologne	Team
Gold medal – first place	2003 Amstelveen	Team
Gold medal – first place	2006 Terrassa	Team
Silver medal – second place	2004 Lahore	Team
Silver medal – second place	2005 Chennai	Team
Bronze medal – third place	2007 Kuala Lumpur	Team
Bronze medal – third place	2011 Auckland	Team

Taeke Wiebe Doekes Taekema (born 14 January 1980) is a Dutch field hockey player and drag flicker (penalty corner specialist) who won the silver medal with the national squad at the 2004 Summer Olympics in Athens. Born in Leiderdorp, he made his debut on 28 January 2000 in a friendly match in and against Egypt and has played in over two hundred international matches for the Dutch.

During the 2007 Men's EuroHockey Nations Championship, Taekema struck a record 16 goals, including a double hat trick against Belgium in the semi-finals. Sportswear maker Adidas introduced its limited edition TT10 hockey stick, which incorporated Taekema's initials and jersey number.

He was the top scorer in the 2010 Men's Hockey World Cup held in New Delhi with 8 goals along with Luke Doerner.

== International goals ==
No.	Date	Venue	Opponent	Score	Result	Competition
1.	2 June 2000	Amstelveen, Netherlands	Spain	1–0	1–0	2000 Men's Hockey Champions Trophy
2.	3 November 2001	Rotterdam, Netherlands	Pakistan	1–0	1–1	2001 Men's Hockey Champions Trophy
3.	10 November 2001	Rotterdam, Netherlands	Germany	1–2	2–3	2001 Men's Hockey Champions Trophy
4.	11 November 2001	Rotterdam, Netherlands	Pakistan	3–0	5–2	2001 Men's Hockey Champions Trophy
5.	27 February 2002	Kuala Lumpur, Malaysia	Belgium	3–0	5–1	2002 Men's Hockey World Cup
6.	27 February 2002	Kuala Lumpur, Malaysia	Belgium	5–1	5–1	2002 Men's Hockey World Cup
7.	31 August 2002	Cologne, Germany	India	1–0	3–3	2002 Men's Hockey Champions Trophy
8.	1 September 2002	Cologne, Germany	Australia	4–0	6–1	2002 Men's Hockey Champions Trophy
9.	3 September 2002	Cologne, Germany	Pakistan	1–0	3–1	2002 Men's Hockey Champions Trophy
10.	3 September 2002	Cologne, Germany	Pakistan	2–0	3–1	2002 Men's Hockey Champions Trophy
11.	5 September 2002	Cologne, Germany	South Korea	1–0	4–2	2002 Men's Hockey Champions Trophy
12.	5 September 2002	Cologne, Germany	South Korea	3–1	4–2	2002 Men's Hockey Champions Trophy
13.	6 September 2002	Cologne, Germany	Germany	3–2	5–2	2002 Men's Hockey Champions Trophy
14.	16 August 2003	Amstelveen, Netherlands	India	2–3	4–3	2003 Men's Hockey Champions Trophy
15.	17 August 2003	Amstelveen, Netherlands	Australia	4–1	5–3	2003 Men's Hockey Champions Trophy
16.	19 August 2003	Amstelveen, Netherlands	Pakistan	2–1	2–2	2003 Men's Hockey Champions Trophy
17.	21 August 2003	Amstelveen, Netherlands	Argentina	2–0	6–3	2003 Men's Hockey Champions Trophy
18.	2 March 2004	Madrid, Spain	South Africa	1–1	5–1	2004 Men's Field Hockey Olympic Qualifier
19.	3 March 2004	Madrid, Spain	Great Britain	1–0	3–0	2004 Men's Field Hockey Olympic Qualifier
20.	11 March 2004	Madrid, Spain	India	1–0	4–2	2004 Men's Field Hockey Olympic Qualifier
21.	11 March 2004	Madrid, Spain	India	2–1	4–2	2004 Men's Field Hockey Olympic Qualifier
22.	15 August 2004	Athens, Greece	India	3–0	3–1	2004 Summer Olympics
23.	17 August 2004	Athens, Greece	New Zealand	1–0	4–3	2004 Summer Olympics
24.	17 August 2004	Athens, Greece	New Zealand	2–1	4–3	2004 Summer Olympics
25.	21 August 2004	Athens, Greece	Argentina	3–0	4–2	2004 Summer Olympics
26.	22 August 2004	Athens, Greece	Australia	1–0	2–1	2004 Summer Olympics
27.	22 August 2004	Athens, Greece	Australia	2–0	2–1	2004 Summer Olympics
28.	25 August 2004	Athens, Greece	Germany	1–1	3–2	2004 Summer Olympics
29.	4 December 2004	Lahore, Pakistan	New Zealand	1–0	5–2	2004 Men's Hockey Champions Trophy
30.	4 December 2004	Lahore, Pakistan	New Zealand	4–2	5–2	2004 Men's Hockey Champions Trophy
31.	5 December 2004	Lahore, Pakistan	India	2–1	5–4	2004 Men's Hockey Champions Trophy
32.	7 December 2004	Lahore, Pakistan	Pakistan	2–1	4–1	2004 Men's Hockey Champions Trophy
33.	10 December 2004	Lahore, Pakistan	Germany	3–2	3–4	2004 Men's Hockey Champions Trophy
34.	12 December 2004	Lahore, Pakistan	Spain	1–1	2–4	2004 Men's Hockey Champions Trophy
35.	28 August 2005	Leipzig, Germany	France	2–0	5–4	2005 Men's EuroHockey Nations Championship
36.	28 August 2005	Leipzig, Germany	France	3–0	5–4	2005 Men's EuroHockey Nations Championship
37.	29 August 2005	Leipzig, Germany	Poland	1–0	2–1	2005 Men's EuroHockey Nations Championship
38.	29 August 2005	Leipzig, Germany	Poland	2–0	2–1	2005 Men's EuroHockey Nations Championship
39.	3 September 2005	Leipzig, Germany	Belgium	2–0	6–1	2005 Men's EuroHockey Nations Championship
40.	3 September 2005	Leipzig, Germany	Belgium	3–0	6–1	2005 Men's EuroHockey Nations Championship
41.	4 September 2005	Leipzig, Germany	Spain	2–1	2–4	2005 Men's EuroHockey Nations Championship
42.	14 December 2005	Chennai, India	Australia	1–1	2–3	2005 Men's Hockey Champions Trophy
43.	14 December 2005	Chennai, India	Australia	2–2	2–3	2005 Men's Hockey Champions Trophy
44.	16 December 2005	Chennai, India	India	2–1	2–1	2005 Men's Hockey Champions Trophy
45.	18 December 2005	Chennai, India	Australia	1–3	1–3	2005 Men's Hockey Champions Trophy
46.	25 June 2006	Ipoh, Malaysia	Australia	2–0	6–2	2006 Sultan Azlan Shah Cup
47.	22 July 2006	Terrassa, Spain	Argentina	1–0	4–2	2006 Men's Hockey Champions Trophy
48.	22 July 2006	Terrassa, Spain	Argentina	3–1	4–2	2006 Men's Hockey Champions Trophy
49.	22 July 2006	Terrassa, Spain	Argentina	4–2	4–2	2006 Men's Hockey Champions Trophy
50.	23 July 2006	Terrassa, Spain	Australia	1–1	1–1	2006 Men's Hockey Champions Trophy
51.	25 July 2006	Terrassa, Spain	Pakistan	7–2	9–2	2006 Men's Hockey Champions Trophy
52.	27 July 2006	Terrassa, Spain	Germany	3–3	3–3	2006 Men's Hockey Champions Trophy
53.	29 July 2006	Terrassa, Spain	Spain	3–3	4–3	2006 Men's Hockey Champions Trophy
54.	30 July 2006	Terrassa, Spain	Germany	1–0	2–1	2006 Men's Hockey Champions Trophy
55.	6 September 2006	Mönchengladbach, Germany	South Korea	2–2	2–3	2006 Men's Hockey World Cup
56.	7 September 2006	Mönchengladbach, Germany	South Africa	1–0	2–0	2006 Men's Hockey World Cup
57.	11 September 2006	Mönchengladbach, Germany	England	3–3	4–3	2006 Men's Hockey World Cup
58.	11 September 2006	Mönchengladbach, Germany	England	4–3	4–3	2006 Men's Hockey World Cup
59.	12 September 2006	Mönchengladbach, Germany	India	1–0	6–1	2006 Men's Hockey World Cup
60.	12 September 2006	Mönchengladbach, Germany	India	2–1	6–1	2006 Men's Hockey World Cup
61.	12 September 2006	Mönchengladbach, Germany	India	3–1	6–1	2006 Men's Hockey World Cup
62.	12 September 2006	Mönchengladbach, Germany	India	4–1	6–1	2006 Men's Hockey World Cup
63.	12 September 2006	Mönchengladbach, Germany	India	6–1	6–1	2006 Men's Hockey World Cup
64.	15 September 2006	Mönchengladbach, Germany	Pakistan	2–3	2–3	2006 Men's Hockey World Cup
65.	16 September 2006	Mönchengladbach, Germany	New Zealand	2–0	3–0	2006 Men's Hockey World Cup
66.	19 August 2007	Manchester, England	France	1–0	8–3	2007 Men's EuroHockey Nations Championship
67.	19 August 2007	Manchester, England	France	2–0	8–3	2007 Men's EuroHockey Nations Championship
68.	19 August 2007	Manchester, England	France	4–0	8–3	2007 Men's EuroHockey Nations Championship
69.	19 August 2007	Manchester, England	France	5–1	8–3	2007 Men's EuroHockey Nations Championship
70.	19 August 2007	Manchester, England	France	7–2	8–3	2007 Men's EuroHockey Nations Championship
71.	21 August 2007	Manchester, England	Ireland	1–0	1–0	2007 Men's EuroHockey Nations Championship
72.	22 August 2007	Manchester, England	Spain	2–0	4–2	2007 Men's EuroHockey Nations Championship
73.	22 August 2007	Manchester, England	Spain	4–2	4–2	2007 Men's EuroHockey Nations Championship
74.	24 August 2007	Manchester, England	Belgium	1–1	7–2	2007 Men's EuroHockey Nations Championship
75.	24 August 2007	Manchester, England	Belgium	2–1	7–2	2007 Men's EuroHockey Nations Championship
76.	24 August 2007	Manchester, England	Belgium	4–2	7–2	2007 Men's EuroHockey Nations Championship
77.	24 August 2007	Manchester, England	Belgium	5–2	7–2	2007 Men's EuroHockey Nations Championship
78.	24 August 2007	Manchester, England	Belgium	6–2	7–2	2007 Men's EuroHockey Nations Championship
79.	24 August 2007	Manchester, England	Belgium	7–2	7–2	2007 Men's EuroHockey Nations Championship
80.	26 August 2007	Manchester, England	Spain	2–0	3–2	2007 Men's EuroHockey Nations Championship
81.	26 August 2007	Manchester, England	Spain	3–1	3–2	2007 Men's EuroHockey Nations Championship
82.	30 November 2007	Kuala Lumpur, Malaysia	Malaysia	1–1	3–1	2007 Men's Hockey Champions Trophy
83.	5 December 2007	Kuala Lumpur, Malaysia	Germany	1–0	3–3	2007 Men's Hockey Champions Trophy
84.	6 December 2007	Kuala Lumpur, Malaysia	Australia	2–1	3–3	2007 Men's Hockey Champions Trophy
85.	8 December 2007	Kuala Lumpur, Malaysia	Pakistan	1–0	4–1	2007 Men's Hockey Champions Trophy
86.	8 December 2007	Kuala Lumpur, Malaysia	Pakistan	3–1	4–1	2007 Men's Hockey Champions Trophy
87.	8 December 2007	Kuala Lumpur, Malaysia	Pakistan	4–1	4–1	2007 Men's Hockey Champions Trophy
88.	9 December 2007	Kuala Lumpur, Malaysia	South Korea	1–0	3–2	2007 Men's Hockey Champions Trophy
89.	11 August 2008	Beijing, China	South Africa	1–0	5–0	2008 Summer Olympics
90.	11 August 2008	Beijing, China	South Africa	2–0	5–0	2008 Summer Olympics
91.	13 August 2008	Beijing, China	Great Britain	1–0	1–0	2008 Summer Olympics
92.	15 August 2008	Beijing, China	Canada	1–0	4–2	2008 Summer Olympics
93.	15 August 2008	Beijing, China	Canada	2–0	4–2	2008 Summer Olympics
94.	15 August 2008	Beijing, China	Canada	3–1	4–2	2008 Summer Olympics
95.	17 August 2008	Beijing, China	Australia	1–0	2–2	2008 Summer Olympics
96.	17 August 2008	Beijing, China	Australia	2–2	2–2	2008 Summer Olympics
97.	19 August 2008	Beijing, China	Pakistan	2–1	4–2	2008 Summer Olympics
98.	19 August 2008	Beijing, China	Pakistan	3–1	4–2	2008 Summer Olympics
99.	23 August 2008	Beijing, China	Australia	1–3	2–6	2008 Summer Olympics
100.	22 August 2009	Amsterdam, Netherlands	Poland	1–0	9–0	2009 Men's EuroHockey Nations Championship
101.	22 August 2009	Amsterdam, Netherlands	Poland	2–0	9–0	2009 Men's EuroHockey Nations Championship
102.	22 August 2009	Amsterdam, Netherlands	Poland	7–0	9–0	2009 Men's EuroHockey Nations Championship
103.	26 August 2009	Amsterdam, Netherlands	France	1–0	6–0	2009 Men's EuroHockey Nations Championship
104.	26 August 2009	Amsterdam, Netherlands	France	2–0	6–0	2009 Men's EuroHockey Nations Championship
105.	26 August 2009	Amsterdam, Netherlands	France	5–0	6–0	2009 Men's EuroHockey Nations Championship
106.	26 August 2009	Amsterdam, Netherlands	France	6–0	6–0	2009 Men's EuroHockey Nations Championship
107.	28 August 2009	Amsterdam, Netherlands	England	1–1	1–2 (a.e.t.)	2009 Men's EuroHockey Nations Championship
108.	30 August 2009	Amsterdam, Netherlands	Spain	6–1	6–1	2009 Men's EuroHockey Nations Championship
109.	28 November 2009	Melbourne, Australia	Spain	1–0	3–2	2009 Men's Hockey Champions Trophy
110.	28 November 2009	Melbourne, Australia	Spain	3–0	3–2	2009 Men's Hockey Champions Trophy
111.	29 November 2009	Melbourne, Australia	Australia	1–0	2–7	2009 Men's Hockey Champions Trophy
112.	5 December 2009	Melbourne, Australia	Germany	1–0	4–3	2009 Men's Hockey Champions Trophy
113.	6 December 2009	Melbourne, Australia	South Korea	2–3	2–4	2009 Men's Hockey Champions Trophy
114.	1 March 2010	New Delhi, India	Argentina	1–0	3–0	2010 Men's Hockey World Cup
115.	1 March 2010	New Delhi, India	Argentina	2–0	3–0	2010 Men's Hockey World Cup
116.	1 March 2010	New Delhi, India	Argentina	3–0	3–0	2010 Men's Hockey World Cup
117.	3 March 2010	New Delhi, India	New Zealand	2–1	3–1	2010 Men's Hockey World Cup
118.	5 March 2010	New Delhi, India	Canada	1–0	6–0	2010 Men's Hockey World Cup
119.	11 March 2010	New Delhi, India	Australia	1–2	1–2	2010 Men's Hockey World Cup
120.	13 March 2010	New Delhi, India	England	2–3	4–3	2010 Men's Hockey World Cup
121.	21 August 2011	Mönchengladbach, Germany	France	1–0	8–1	2011 Men's EuroHockey Championship
122.	21 August 2011	Mönchengladbach, Germany	France	7–1	8–1	2011 Men's EuroHockey Championship
123.	22 August 2011	Mönchengladbach, Germany	England	2–1	4–3	2011 Men's EuroHockey Championship
124.	23 August 2011	Mönchengladbach, Germany	Ireland	2–2	7–4	2011 Men's EuroHockey Championship
125.	23 August 2011	Mönchengladbach, Germany	Ireland	3–2	7–4	2011 Men's EuroHockey Championship
126.	23 August 2011	Mönchengladbach, Germany	Ireland	4–2	7–4	2011 Men's EuroHockey Championship
127.	23 August 2011	Mönchengladbach, Germany	Ireland	5–2	7–4	2011 Men's EuroHockey Championship
128.	25 August 2011	Mönchengladbach, Germany	Belgium	2–2	4–2	2011 Men's EuroHockey Championship
129.	25 August 2011	Mönchengladbach, Germany	Belgium	3–2	4–2	2011 Men's EuroHockey Championship
130.	3 December 2011	Auckland, New Zealand	South Korea	1–0	2–0	2011 Men's Hockey Champions Trophy
131.	6 December 2011	Auckland, New Zealand	New Zealand	3–0	3–3	2011 Men's Hockey Champions Trophy
