= Iain Mackay (field hockey) =

British field hockey player (born 1985)

Personal information
- Born: 24 April 1985 (age 41) Braintree, Essex, England
- Height: 180 cm (5 ft 11 in)
- Weight: 75 kg (165 lb)

Sport
- Sport: Field hockey
- Position: Midfield
Senior career
Years	Team	Caps	Goals
2007–2012	Reading	-	-
2012–2014	Hampstead & Westminster	-	-
National team
Years	Team	Caps	Goals
–	Great Britain		-
–	England		-
Medal record
Men's field hockey
Representing England
Champions Trophy
Silver medal – second place	2010 Mönchengladbach	Team
European Championship
Gold medal – first place	2009 Amsterdam	Team

Iain Mackay (born 24 April 1985) is a British field hockey player who competed at the 2012 Summer Olympics.

== Biography ==
MacKay was educated at Bishop's Stortford College in Hertfordshire. Later, he attended college at Loughborough University.

He played junior hockey for Braintree Hockey Club and played senior club hockey with Reading in the Men's England Hockey League and began playing internationally in 2009 and helped England to a win in the 2009 Men's EuroHockey Nations Championship

He played in the 2010 Commonwealth Games in Delhi and was part of the silver medal winning England team that competed at the 2010 Men's Hockey Champions Trophy in Mönchengladbach, Germany.

He represented Great Britain at the 2012 Olympic Games in London in the field hockey tournament.

After the Olympics he left Reading to join Hampstead & Westminster.
