= Ashley Jackson (field hockey) =

English field hockey player (born 1987)

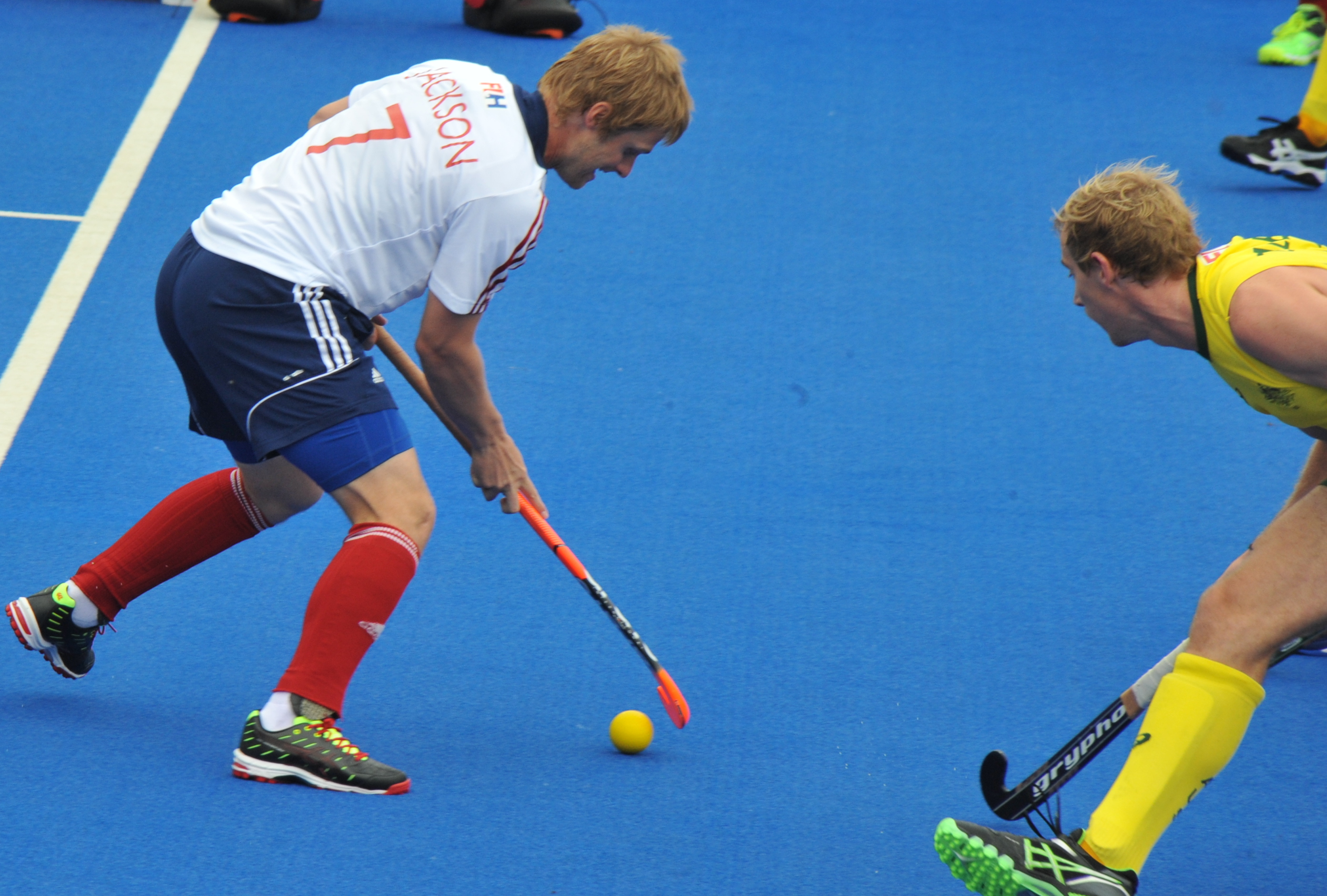
- Great Britain v Australia 13 June 2015

Personal information
- Born: 27 August 1987 (age 38) Tunbridge Wells, Kent, England
- Height: 1.70 m (5 ft 7 in)
- Weight: 73 kg (161 lb)

Sport
- Sport: Field hockey
- Position: Midfielder
Senior career
Years	Team	Caps	Goals
2003–2008	East Grinstead	40	76
2008–2010	HGC	-	-
2010–2015	East Grinstead	38	58
2015–2016	Holcombe	12	6
2015–2017	Ranchi Rays	42	36
2016–2018	East Grinstead	8	12
2018–2019	HGC	-	-
2019–2026	Old Georgians	-	-
National team
Years	Team	Caps	Goals
2006–2021	England & GB	250	(137)
Medal record
Men's field hockey
Representing England
Champions Trophy
Silver medal – second place	2010 Mönchengladbach	Team
European Championship
Gold medal – first place	2009 Amsterdam	Team
Bronze medal – third place	2011 Mönchengladbach	Team
Commonwealth Games
Bronze medal – third place	2014 Glasgow	Team
World League
Bronze medal – third place	2014 New Delhi	Team

Ashley Steven Jackson (born 27 August 1987) is an English field hockey player who plays club hockey as a defender or midfielder for Old Georgians'.

He represented the England and Great Britain national teams from 2006 until 2021 and appeared at three Olympic Games.

== Biography ==
Jackson first started playing hockey for Tunbridge Wells Hockey Club whilst a schoolboy at Sutton Valence, Kent.

He played club hockey in the Men's England Hockey League Premier Division for East Grinstead from 2003 to 2008 and while there, Jackson made his full international debut for Great Britain in 2007 Men's Hockey Champions Trophy. Jackson then competed for Great Britain at the 2008 Olympic Games in Beijing.

During his first spell for HGC in the Dutch League, he made his debut for England in 2009 Men's Hockey Champions Trophy and went on to win gold in the 2009 Men's EuroHockey Nations Championship, where he also won the Player of the Tournament. He was named FIH Young Player of the year 2009 and is the first English player to receive this accolade. Jackson also played in the 2010 Commonwealth Games in Delhi and was part of the silver medal winning England team that competed at the 2010 Men's Hockey Champions Trophy in Mönchengladbach, Germany.

He returned to East Grinstead and in 2012, went to his second Olympics, finishing 4th at the 2012 Summer Olympics in London. Jackson also played in the England squad that won bronze at the 2014 Commonwealth Games.

In December 2014 Jackson began playing ice hockey for Invicta Dynamos, scoring a goal on his debut against London Raiders.

Jackson played for Holcombe from 2015 to 2016 and Ranchi Rays in the Hockey India League. He competed in his third Olympics at the Rio 2016 Summer Olympics before re-joining East Grinstead.

For the 2019/20 season, Jackson joined Old Georgians, where he later experienced significant success helping the team win two league and cup doubles during the 2021-22 season and 2022-23 seasons and the league title during the 2023-24 season.

Preceded by Eddie Ockenden	FIH Young Player of the Year; 2009	Succeeded by Tobias Hauke
