= Tim Jenniskens =

Dutch field hockey player

Personal information
- Full name: Tim Antonius Jenniskens
- Born: 23 September 1986 (age 40) Tilburg, Netherlands
- Height: 1.86 kg
- Weight: 72 kg (159 lb)

Sport
- Sport: Field hockey
- Position: Defender
Senior career
| Years | Team | Caps | Goals |
| –2007 | Tilburg | - | - |
| 2007–2018 | Bloemendaal | - | - |
| 2013 | Delhi Waveriders | - | - |
National team
| Years | Team | Caps | Goals |
| 2007–2013 | Netherlands | 58 | (5) |
Medal record
Men's field hockey
Representing the Netherlands
Olympic Games
| Silver medal – second place | 2012 London | Team |
EuroHockey Championship
| Silver medal – second place | 2011 Mönchengladbach |
| Bronze medal – third place | 2013 Boom |
Champions Trophy
| Silver medal – second place | 2012 Melbourne |
| Bronze medal – third place | 2010 Mönchengladbach |
| Bronze medal – third place | 2011 Auckland |

Tim Antonius Jenniskens (born 23 September 1986) is a Dutch former field hockey player who played as a defender.

At the 2012 Summer Olympics Jenniskens competed with the Netherlands national field hockey team in the men's tournament, winning a silver medal. He played for Tilburg before he joined Bloemendaal in 2007. He played 11 seasons until 2018 in Bloemendaal, during which he won three Dutch national titles and three Euro Hockey League titles. He also played one season in the Hockey India League for the Delhi Waveriders.

== Honours ==
Bloemendaal

- Hoofdklasse: 2007–08, 2008–09, 2009–10
- Euro Hockey League: 2008–09, 2012–13, 2017–18

Netherlands

- Summer Olympics silver medal: 2012
