= Richard Smith (field hockey) =

English field hockey player (born 1987)

Personal information
- Born: 28 September 1987 (age 39) Portsmouth, England
- Height: 93 kg
- Weight: 189 cm

Sport
- Sport: Field hockey
- Position: Defender
Senior career
Years	Team	Caps	Goals
–	City of Portsmouth	-	-
–	Guildford	-	-
2006–2012	Loughborough Students	-	-
2012–2013	Racing Club de Bruxelles	-	-
2013–2020	Hampstead & Westminster	-	-
2020–2021	Klein Zwitserland	-	-
National team
Years	Team	Caps	Goals
2009–2013	England & GB	120	(16)
Coaching career
- 2021–2024: Klein Zwitserland (assistant)
- 2024–2025: HDM
Medal record
Men's field hockey
Representing England
EuroHockey Championship
Gold medal – first place	2009 Amstelveen
Bronze medal – third place	2011 Mönchengladbach
Champions Trophy
Silver medal – second place	2010 Mönchengladbach

Richard Christopher Michael Wijtenburg-Smith (born 28 September 1987) is an English field hockey coach and former player and former head coach of Dutch Hoofdklasse club HDM. He played for England and Great Britain and competed at the 2012 Summer Olympics.

== Biography ==
Smith played club hockey for City of Portsmouth and Guildford before joining Loughborough Students in the Men's England Hockey League for the 2006/07 season. While at Loughborough he made his international debut in 2009. He also won gold at the 2009 EuroHockey Championship with England and played in the 2010 Commonwealth Games in Delhi. he was also part of the silver medal-winning England team that competed at the 2010 Men's Hockey Champions Trophy in Mönchengladbach, Germany.

He competed for Great Britain at the 2012 Summer Olympics.

After the Olympics he spent a year playing in Belgium for Racing Club de Bruxelles before returning to England to play for Hampstead & Westminster until 2020.

On 16 June 2020, it was announced he joined Klein Zwitserland in The Hague for the 2020–21 season as he moved to the Netherlands. After one season in The Hague he retired from playing top-level hockey.

After his retirement, he became the assistant coach of his former team at Klein Zwitserland. In 2024 he was appointed as the head coach of HDM but on 14 March 2025, it was announced that Richard Smith and HDM had parted.
