= Robbert Kemperman =

Dutch field hockey player (born 1990)

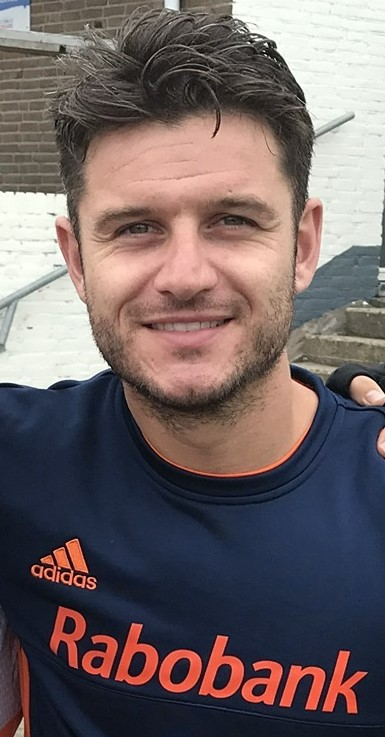

Personal information
- Full name: Robbert Huib Kemperman
- Born: 24 June 1990 (age 36) Nijmegen, Netherlands
- Height: 1.86 m (6 ft 1 in)
- Weight: 76 kg (168 lb)

Sport
- Sport: Field hockey
- Position: Defender / Midfielder
- Club: Amsterdam
Youth career
- Years: Team
- 1995–2005: Union
- 2005–2008: Den Bosch
Senior career
Years	Team	Caps	Goals
2005–2010	Den Bosch	-	-
2010–2012	Rot-Weiss Köln	-	-
2012–2022	Kampong	-	-
2019	UniKL	-	-
2022–present	Amsterdam	-	-
National team
Years	Team	Caps	Goals
2008–2021	Netherlands	228	(52)
Medal record
Men's field hockey
Representing the Netherlands
Olympic Games
Silver medal – second place	2012 London	Team
World Cup
Silver medal – second place	2014 The Hague
Silver medal – second place	2018 Bhubaneswar
Bronze medal – third place	2010 New Delhi
EuroHockey Championship
Gold medal – first place	2015 London
Gold medal – first place	2017 Amstelveen
Gold medal – first place	2021 Amstelveen
Silver medal – second place	2009 Mönchengladbach
Bronze medal – third place	2009 Amstelveen
Bronze medal – third place	2013 Boom
Champions Trophy
Silver medal – second place	2012 Melbourne
Bronze medal – third place	2010 Mönchengladbach
Bronze medal – third place	2018 Breda
Hockey World League
Gold medal – first place	2012–13 New Delhi	Team

Robbert Huib Kemperman (Dutch pronunciation: [ˈrɔbərt ˈkɛmpərmɑn]; born 24 June 1990) is a Dutch field hockey player who plays as a midfielder or defender for Hoofdklasse club Amsterdam.

He played a total of 228 matches for the Dutch national team and scored 52 goals. He played in three Olympic Games and three World Cups.

== International career ==
At the 2012 Summer Olympics, he competed for the national team in the men's tournament, where he won a silver medal. He made his debut for the national team in 2008, and at just 17 years and 111 days of age he is the second-youngest debutant ever in Dutch national hockey team.

In 2018, Kemperman played in his third World Cup, where they won the silver medal. Due to his decision to play in the 2019 Malaysia Hockey League, he was not selected for the 2019 Pro League. After the 2019 EuroHockey Championships he returned in the national team for the FIH Olympic Qualifier against Pakistan. In June 2023 he announced he would retire from the national team after not having played internationally since the 2020 Summer Olympics.

== Club career ==
Born in Nijmegen, he started playing hockey when he was 5 at the local hockey club RKHV Union. In 2005 he went to HC 's-Hertogenbosch where he made his debut for the first team when he was just 15 years old. After his years at 's-Hertogenbosch, he went to Rot-Weiss Köln in Germany in 2010. He played there for two seasons before returning to the Netherlands, where he joined SV Kampong. In 2016 he won the 2015–16 Euro Hockey League with Kampong and then won two consecutive Dutch national titles in 2017 and 2018. In the winter of 2019, he played in Malaysia for UniKL in the Malaysia Hockey League.

In December 2021 it was announced he would leave Kampong after ten seasons and play for Amsterdam from the summer of 2022 onwards. During the disappointing 2023–24 season, he was placed as a defender where he kept playing. The season afterwards, he won his third national title by defeating his old club Kampong in the championship final.

== Personal life ==
Kemperman is in a relationship with former Dutch field hockey international Sophie Polkamp.

== Honours ==
=== Club ===
Kampong

- Euro Hockey League: 2015–16
- Hoofdklasse: 2016–17, 2017–18

UniKL

- Malaysia Hockey League: 2019

Amsterdam

- Hoofdklasse: 2024–25

=== Netherlands ===
- Summer Olympics silver medal: 2012
- EuroHockey Championship: 2015, 2017, 2021
- Hockey World League: 2012–13
