= 2011 Men's EuroHockey Championship =

Continental hockey championship

Tournament details
- Host country: Germany
- City: Mönchengladbach
- Dates: 20–28 August
- Teams: 8 (from 1 confederation)
- Venue: Warsteiner HockeyPark

Final positions
- Champions: Germany (7th title)
- Runner-up: Netherlands
- Third place: England

Tournament statistics
- Matches played: 20
- Goals scored: 120 (6 per match)
- Top scorer: (Netherlands) Taeke Taekema (9 goals)
- Best player: (Germany) Moritz Fürste

The 2011 Men's EuroHockey Championship was the 13th edition of the EuroHockey Nations Championship, the biennial international men's field hockey championship of Europe organized by the European Hockey Federation. It was held from 20 to 28 August 2011 in Mönchengladbach, Germany.

This tournament also served as a qualifier for the 2012 Olympics, with the finalists and the team finishing in third position earning a spot. However, because England finished in the top three, the fourth team (Belgium) qualified instead, as England cannot qualify as a nation for the Olympics (they automatically participated as Great Britain).

The hosts Germany won its seventh title by defeating the Netherlands 4–2 in the final. The defending champions England won the bronze medal by defeating Belgium 2–1.

== Qualified teams ==
| Dates | Event | Location | Quotas | Qualifier(s) |
|---|---|---|---|---|
| Host | | | 1 | Germany |
| 22–30 August 2009 | 2009 EuroHockey Championship | Amstelveen, Netherlands | 5 | Belgium; England; France; Netherlands; Spain |
| 1–8 August 2009 | 2009 EuroHockey Nations Trophy | Wrexham, Wales | 2 | Ireland; Russia |
| Total | | | 8 | |

== Results ==
All times are local, CEST (UTC+2).

=== Pool A ===
| Pos | Team | Pld | W | D | L | GF | GA | GD | Pts | Qualification |
|---|---|---|---|---|---|---|---|---|---|---|
| 1 | Germany (H) | 3 | 3 | 0 | 0 | 13 | 2 | +11 | 9 | Semi-finals |
| 2 | Belgium | 3 | 2 | 0 | 1 | 11 | 6 | +5 | 6 | Semi-finals |
| 3 | Spain | 3 | 1 | 0 | 2 | 8 | 6 | +2 | 3 | Pool C |
| 4 | Russia | 3 | 0 | 0 | 3 | 1 | 19 | −18 | 0 | Pool C |

(H) Hosts

20 August 2011
16:00

| Germany | 3–1 | Belgium |
|---|---|---|
| Stralkowski 42'; Fuchs 51'; Montag 57' | Report | Dekeyser 55' |

Umpires:
Andrew Mair (SCO)
David Gentles (AUS)

20 August 2011
20:00

| Spain | 5 – 0 | Russia |
|---|---|---|
| Quemada 14', 27', 41'; Oliva 45'; Terraza 57' | Report |

Umpires:
Christian Blasch (GER)
Marc Knulle (FRA)

22 August 2011
15:00

| Spain | 1–3 | Germany |
|---|---|---|
| Tubau 69' | Report | Wesley 41'; Stralkowski 48'; Luycx 65' |

Umpires:
Roel van Eert (NED)
Hamish Jamson (ENG)

22 August 2011
17:00

| Belgium | 7–1 | Russia |
|---|---|---|
| Dekeyser 4', 38', 45'; Gougnard 13'; Boon 26'; Charlier 57', 64' | Report | Zhirkov 53' |

Umpires:
Marc Knülle (FRA)
Geoff Conn (IRL)

24 August 2011
15:00

| Germany | 7–0 | Russia |
|---|---|---|
| Montag 2', 6'; Fürste 32', 61'; Stralkowski 48'; Wesley 50'; Fuchs 57' | Report |

Umpires:
Marc Knülle (FRA)
Gregory Uyttenhove (BEL)

24 August 2011
20:00

| Belgium | 3–2 | Spain |
|---|---|---|
| Luycx 40'; Boon 44'; Dekeyser 62' | Report | Oliva 16'; Fernandez 22' |

Umpires:
David Gentles (AUS)
Hamish Jamson (ENG)

=== Pool B ===
| Pos | Team | Pld | W | D | L | GF | GA | GD | Pts | Qualification |
|---|---|---|---|---|---|---|---|---|---|---|
| 1 | Netherlands | 3 | 3 | 0 | 0 | 19 | 8 | +11 | 9 | Semi-finals |
| 2 | England | 3 | 2 | 0 | 1 | 15 | 7 | +8 | 6 | Semi-finals |
| 3 | Ireland | 3 | 1 | 0 | 2 | 8 | 11 | −3 | 3 | Pool C |
| 4 | France | 3 | 0 | 0 | 3 | 2 | 18 | −16 | 0 | Pool C |

21 August 2011
10:00

| England | 4–2 | Ireland |
|---|---|---|
| Daly 21'; Middleton 40', 68'; Jackson 50' | Report | Cargo 14'; Jermyn 61' |

Umpires:
Roel van Eert (NED)
Gregory Uyttenhove (BEL)

21 August 2011
14:00

| Netherlands | 8–1 | France |
|---|---|---|
| Taekema 12', 61'; Jenniskens 22'; Weusthof 28'; Evers 35', 36', 62' van der Horst 49' | Report | Pauchet 50' |

Umpires:
Hamish Jamson (ENG)
Francisco Vasquez Lopez (ESP)

22 August 2011
13:00

| France | 0–2 | Ireland |
|---|---|---|
| | Report | Jermyn 56', 68' |

Umpires:
Francisco Vazquez Lopez (ESP)
Gregory Uyttenhove (BEL)

22 August 2011
19:00

| England | 3–4 | Netherlands |
|---|---|---|
| Daly 24', 54'; Jackson 65' | Report | Bakker 10', 40', 58'; Taekema 39' |

Umpires:
Nathan Stagno (GIB)
Christian Blasch (GER)

24 August 2011
13:00

| France | 1–8 | England |
|---|---|---|
| Magner 42' | Report | Jackson 8', 30', 56'; Alexander 15', 46'; Tindall 44', 58'; Dixon 52' |

Umpires:
Nathan Stagno (GIB)
Geoff Conn (IRL)

24 August 2011
18:00

| Netherlands | 7–4 | Ireland |
|---|---|---|
| de Voogd 7', 68'; Taekema 27', 31', 46', 51'; Nooijer 60' | Report | Magee 14'; McCabe 22'; Cockram 62'; Watt 69' |

Umpires:
Andy Mair (GBR)
Francisco Vázquez López (ESP)

=== Fifth to eighth place classification ===
The points obtained in the preliminary round against the other team are taken over.

==== Pool C ====
| Pos | Team | Pld | W | D | L | GF | GA | GD | Pts | Relegation |
|---|---|---|---|---|---|---|---|---|---|---|
| 5 | Ireland | 3 | 3 | 0 | 0 | 13 | 4 | +9 | 9 | |
| 6 | Spain | 3 | 2 | 0 | 1 | 9 | 4 | +5 | 6 | |
| 7 | Russia | 3 | 1 | 0 | 2 | 7 | 15 | −8 | 3 | EuroHockey Championship II |
| 8 | France | 3 | 0 | 0 | 3 | 3 | 9 | −6 | 0 | EuroHockey Championship II |

26 August 2011
14:00

| Russia | 2–8 | Ireland |
|---|---|---|
| Platonov 35'; Plesetskiy 50' | Report | Watt 15'; Darling 21'; Magee 24'; Cockram 32'; Ames 33'; McCabe 39'; Jermyn 63', 70' |

Umpires:
Gregory Uyttenhove (BEL)
David Gentles (AUS)

26 August 2011
16:00

| Spain | 2–1 | France |
|---|---|---|
| Tubau 22'; Salles 62' | Report | Sevestre 18' |

Umpires:
Geoff Conn (IRL)
Andrew Mair (GBR)

28 August 2011
08:30

| Russia | 5–2 | France |
|---|---|---|
| Volkov 5'; Platonov 6', 45'; Yankun 39'; Golubev 42' | Report | Sevestre 11'; Pauchet 17' |

Umpires:
Geoff Conn (IRL)
Nathan Stagno (GIB)

28 August 2011
10:30

| Spain | 2–3 | Ireland |
|---|---|---|
| Quemada 25'; Freixa 42' | Report | Magee 32'; Cockram 64', 70' |

Umpires:
Marc Knülle (FRA)
Roel van Eert (NED)

=== First to fourth place classification ===
Semi-finals
26 August
Belgium | 2
Netherlands | 4
26 August
Germany | 3
England | 0

Final
28 August
Netherlands | 2
Germany | 4
Third place
28 August
Belgium | 1
England (a.e.t.) | 2

==== Semi-finals ====
26 August 2011
18:30

| Belgium | 2–4 | Netherlands |
|---|---|---|
| van Aubel 22'; Gougnard 29' | Report | Verga 15'; Taekema 32', 39'; Kemperman 61' |

Umpires:
Hamish Jamson (ENG)
Christian Blasch (GER)

26 August 2011
21:00

| Germany | 3–0 | England |
|---|---|---|
| Zeller 16'; Deecke 61'; Korn 68' | Report |

Umpires:
Roel van Eert (NED)
Nathan Stagno (GIB)

==== Third place game ====
28 August 2011
13:00

| Belgium | 1–2 (a.e.t.) | England |
|---|---|---|
| de Paeuw 43' | Report | Mantell 6'; Tindall 75' |

Umpires:
Francisco Vasquez Lopez (ESP)
Christian Blasch (GER)

==== Final ====
28 August 2011
15:30

| Netherlands | 2–4 | Germany |
|---|---|---|
| Weusthof 19' de Nooijer 53' | Report | Zeller 1'; Fürste 32'; Fuchs 42'; Korn 68' |

Umpires:
David Gentles (AUS)
Andy Mair (GBR)

Stadium: Warsteiner HockeyPark
Attendance: 9,000

== Final standings ==
| Rank | Team |
|---|---|
| Gold medal | Germany |
| Silver medal | Netherlands |
| Bronze medal | England |
| 4 | Belgium |
| 5 | Ireland |
| 6 | Spain |
| 7 | Russia |
| 8 | France |

Qualified for the 2012 Summer Olympics

Qualified for the 2012 Summer Olympics as hosts

Relegated to the EuroHockey Championship II

== See also ==
- 2011 Men's EuroHockey Championship II
- 2011 Women's EuroHockey Nations Championship
