= Manel Terraza =

Spanish field hockey player (born 1990)

Personal information
- Full name: Manel Terraza Farré
- Nationality: Spanish
- Born: 11 May 1990 (age 36)
- Height: 1.84 m (6 ft 0 in)
- Weight: 78 kg (172 lb)

Sport
- Country: Spain
- Sport: Field hockey

Manel Terraza Farré (born 11 May 1990) is a Spanish field hockey player. At the 2012 Summer Olympics, he competed for the national team in the men's tournament.
