= Barry Middleton =

British field hockey player (born 1984)

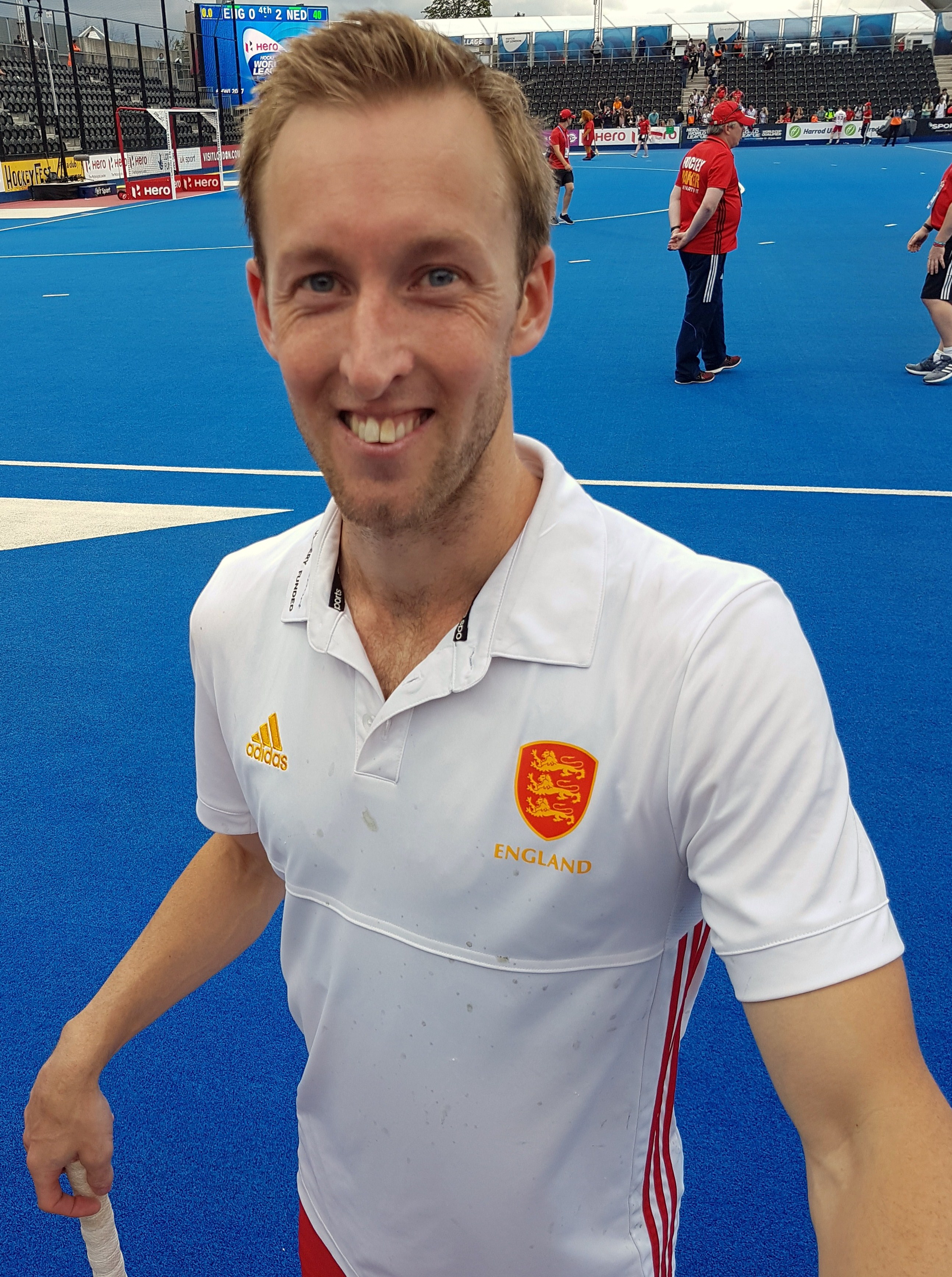

Personal information
- Born: 12 January 1984 (age 42) Doncaster, South Yorkshire, England
- Height: 1.76 m (5 ft 9 in)
- Weight: 70 kg (154 lb)

Sport
- Sport: Field hockey
- Position: Midfielder
Senior career
Years	Team	Caps	Goals
2002–2006	Cannock	30	38
2007–2011	HGC	-	-
2011–2012	East Grinstead	4	5
2012–2013	Der Club an der Alster	-	-
2013–2024	Holcombe	29	27
2015	Ranchi Rays	3	-
2024–2026	Surbiton	-	-
National team
Years	Team	Caps	Goals
2003–2018	England & GB	432	(120)
Medal record
Men's field hockey
Representing England
Commonwealth Games
Bronze medal – third place	2018 Gold Coast	Team
European Championships
Bronze medal – third place	2003 Barcelona	Team
Bronze medal – third place	2017 Amsterdam	Team
World League
Bronze medal – third place	2014 New Delhi	Team

Barry John Middleton MBE (born 12 January 1984) is a British field hockey player. He played as a midfielder and forward for England and Great Britain and is the most capped British hockey player in history and captained his country for many years.

Middleton was appointed Member of the Order of the British Empire (MBE) in the 2020 New Year Honours for services to hockey.

== Biography ==
Middleton played club hockey for Cannock in the Men's England Hockey League and while at the club made his international debut, aged 19, in April 2003 against Belgium and was a member of the Great Britain squad that finished ninth at the 2004 Summer Olympics in Athens. He represented England at the 2006 Commonwealth Games in Melbourne.

After moving from Cannock to Dutch club HGC he participated in the 2008 Summer Olympics in Beijing. He was part of the England squad that won the 2009 Eurohockey Nations Cup. He was named in the International Hockey Federation's All-Star team in 2008, 2009 and 2010, and was shortlisted for 'Player of the Year' in those three years. He also played in the 2010 Commonwealth Games in Delhi.

Middleton was playing for East Grinstead when he was selected to captain Great Britain at his third Olympic Games, playing in the 2012 men's tournament in London.

On 24 May 2014 he became the most capped English hockey international when he played his 308th international game. (203 for England, 105 for Great Britain). The match was against Australia at Bisham Abbey, Berkshire. The previous record holder was Russell Garcia with 307 GB/England caps.

He also captained the England squad that won bronze at the 2014 Commonwealth Games and represented Great Britain at the 2016 Olympic Games in Rio de Janeiro.

On 4 December 2017 he played his 400th international match. (255 for England, 145 for Great Britain). The match was against Australia in the 2016–17 Men's FIH Hockey World League Final, Bhubaneswar, India. He represented England and won a bronze medal at the 2018 Commonwealth Games in Gold Coast.

On 19 December 2018 it was announced that he is taking a break from international hockey in 2019. On 8 April 2019 he announced his retirement from international hockey.

On 28 June 2021 he was appointed Director of Hockey for Holcombe, whilst continuing to play for them and on 2 February 2022 it was announced that he would be an Assistant Coach for England for some of the FIH Hockey Pro League matches, in the coming months.

He joined Surbiton Hockey Club as a player coach for the 2024–25 season and helped them win the league title.
