= 2013 Men's EuroHockey Championship squads =

This article displays the rosters for the teams competing at the 2013 Men's EuroHockey Nations Championship. Each team had to submit 18 players.

== Pool A ==
=== Belgium ===
Head Coach: Marc Lammers

2. Xavier Reckinger
3. Jeremy Gucassoff (GK)
4. Arthur Van Doren
5. Jérôme Dekeyser
7. John-John Dohmen
8. Florent van Aubel
9. Sébastien Dockier
10. Cédric Charlier
15. Emmanuel Stockbroeckx
17. Thomas Briels
19. Félix Denayer
21. Vincent Vanasch
22. Simon Gougnard
23. Alexandre De Saedeleer
25. Loïck Luypaert
27. Tom Boon
28. Jérôme Truyens
29. Elliot Van Strydonck

=== Czech Republic ===
Head Coach: Christopher Faust

1. Filip Neusser (GK)
2. Pavel Chrpa (GK)
3. Tomáš Jahoda
4. Martin Hanus
5. Tomáš Procházka
7. Štepan Bernátek
8. Ondrej Vudmaska
9. Reinhard Nicklas
10. Martin Babicky
11. Daniel Piterák (C)
13. Martin Lehovec
14. Jakub Kyndl
15. Tomáš Vohnicky
20. Tomáš Pauer
21. David Vacek
23. Martin Capouch
27. Richard Kotrc
28. Michal Krýsl

=== Germany ===
Head Coach: Markus Weise

1. Nicolas Jacobi (GK)
3. Linus Butt
6. Martin Häner
8. Mats Grambusch
9. Oskar Deecke
10. Christopher Wesley
13. Tobias Hauke
14. Jan-Philipp Rabente
15. Benjamin Weß
16. Pilt Arnold
18. Oliver Korn
20. Martin Zwicker
21. Moritz Fürste (C)
22. Marco Miltkau
23. Florian Fuchs
24. Benedikt Fürk
26. Thilo Stralkowski
30. Felix Reuß (GK)

=== Spain ===
Head Coach: Salvador Indurain

1. Francisco Cortés (GK)
3. Sergi Enrique
5. Bosco Pérez-Pla
7. Miguel Delas
10. Eduard Tubau
11. Roc Oliva
13. Ramón Alegre (C)
14. Gabriel Dabanch
16. Oriol Peremiquel
17. Xavi Lleonart
18. Andrés Mir
19. Marc Sallés
20. Salva Piera
21. Álex Casasayas
22. David Terraza
23. David Alegre
25. Mario Fernández (GK)
30. Pau Quemada

== Pool B ==
=== England ===
Head Coach: Bobby Crutchley

1. George Pinner (GK)
2. James Bailey (GK)
3. Ben Arnold
4. Ollie Willars
6. Henry Weir
8. Simon Mantell
9. Harry Martin
11. Alastair Brogdon
12. Michael Hoare
16. Adam Dixon
18. Barry Middleton (C)
20. Dan Shingles
22. David Condon
23. Tom Carson
24. Iain Lewers
26. Nicholas Catlin
27. Daniel Fox
29. Richard Smith

=== Ireland ===
Head Coach: Andrew Meredith

1. David Harte (GK)
3. John Jackson (C)
4. Jonathan Bell
6. Ronan Gormley
7. Michael Watt
8. Chris Cargo
12. Eugene Magee
13. Peter Caruth
15. Kirk Shimmins
16. Stephen Cole
18. Bruce McCandless
20. Michael Darling
23. David Fitzgerald (GK)
24. Kyle Good
27. Conor Harte
29. Peter Brown
30. Stuart Loughrey
32. Shane O'Donoghue

=== Netherlands ===
Head Coach: Paul van Ass

1. Jaap Stockmann (GK)
2. Pirmin Blaak (GK)
4. Klaas Vermeulen
5. Marcel Balkestein
7. Wouter Jolie
8. Billy Bakker
10. Valentin Verga
11. Jeroen Hertzberger
12. Robbert Kemperman
13. Sander Baart
16. Tim Jenniskens
20. Jelle Galema
22. Rogier Hofman
24. Robert van der Horst (C)
25. Seve van Ass
26. Goof van der Kamp
27. Constantijn Jonker
30. Mink van der Weerden

=== Poland ===
Head Coach: Karol Śnieżek

1. Arkadiusz Matuszak (GK)
2. Pawel Bratkowski
4. Michal Raciniewski
5. Adam Chwalisz
6. Arkadiusz Rutkowski
7. Tomasz Górny
8. Dariusz Rachwalski (C)
10. Bartosz Zywiczka
11. Piotr Mazany
12. Maciej Pacanowski (GK)
13. Tomasz Wachowiak
17. Krystian Makowski
19. Tomasz Marcinkowski
20. Michal Nowakowski
22. Karol Majchrzak
23. Piotr Kozlowski
25. Adrian Krokosz
30. Mateusz Poltaszewski
