= 2010 Men's Hockey Hamburg Masters =

Field hockey competition in northern Germany

Tournament details
- Host country: Germany
- City: Hamburg
- Teams: 4
- Venue(s): Uhlenhorster HC

Final positions
- Champions: Germany (11th title)
- Runner-up: Japan
- Third place: Netherlands

Tournament statistics
- Matches played: 6
- Goals scored: 44 (7.33 per match)
- Top scorer(s): (Germany) Christopher Zeller (5 goals)

The 2010 Men's Hockey Hamburg Masters was the sixteenth edition of the Hamburg Masters, consisting of a series of test matches. It was held in Hamburg, Germany, from 1–4 July 2010, and featured four of the top nations in men's field hockey.

== Competition format ==
The tournament featured the national teams of India, Japan, the Netherlands, and the hosts, Germany, competing in a round-robin format, with each team playing each other once. Three points were awarded for a win, one for a draw, and none for a loss.

Country	March 2010 FIH Ranking	Best World Cup Finish	Best Olympic Games Finish
Germany	2	Champions (2002, 2006)	Champions (1992, 2008)
India	9	Champions (1975)	Champions (1928, 1932, 1936, 1948, 1952, 1956, 1964, 1980)
Japan	16	Ninth Place (1971, 2006)	Runners-Up (1932)
Netherlands	3	Champions (1973, 1990, 1998)	Champions (1996, 2000)

== Officials ==
The following umpires were appointed by the International Hockey Federation to officiate the tournament:

- Björn Bachmann (GER)
- Satoshi Kondo (JPN)
- Gurinder Singh Sangha (IND)
- Jonas van t' Hek (NED)
- Peter Wright (RSA)

== Results ==
All times are local (Central European Summer Time).

=== Pool ===
Pos	Team	Pld	W	D	L	GF	GA	GD	Pts	Result
1	Germany (H)	3	3	0	0	15	7	+8	9	Tournament Champion
2	Japan	3	1	1	1	10	11	−1	4	
3	Netherlands	3	1	0	2	9	11	−2	3	
4	India	3	0	1	2	10	15	−5	1	

Source: Deutscher Hockey-Bund
Rules for classification: 1) Points; 2) Goal difference; 3) Goals scored; 4) Games won; 5) Head-to-head.
(H) Hosts

=== Fixtures ===
1 July 2010
16:30

Netherlands	6–3	India
De Voogd 9'; Kempermann 17'; Hertzberger 20'; Vermeulen 34'; Van der Weerden 46'; Jonker 60'	Report	Mahadik 18'; Sandeep 42'; Ravi Pal 52'

Umpires:
Peter Wright (RSA)
Björn Bachmann (GER)

1 July 2010
18:45

Germany	5–3	Japan
Zeller 23', 26', 57'; Deecke 59'; Menke 67'	Report	Sakamoto 10'; Tsubouchi 34'; Kitazato 68'

Umpires:
Gurinder Singh Sangha (IND)
Jonas van t' Hek (NED)

3 July 2010
14:00

India	3–5	Germany
Sandeep 2'; Rajpal 15'; Dharamvir 41'	Report	Montag 11'; Fuchs 15'; Müller 50'; Zeller 64'; Fürste 70'

Umpires:
Peter Wright (RSA)
Satoshi Kondo (JPN)

3 July 2010
16:30

Netherlands	2–3	Japan
Van der Weerden 14'; Hofman 53'	Report	Kitazato 2'; Tsubouchi 28'; Ono 48'

Umpires:
Björn Bachmann (GER)
Gurinder Singh Sangha (IND)

4 July 2010
11:30

India	4–4	Japan
Khan 6'; Mujtaba 16'; Sandeep 55'; Bharat 57'	Report	Sakamoto 23'; Tsubouchi 51', 70'; Nagasawa 65'

Umpires:
Jonas van t' Hek (NED)
Björn Bachmann (GER)

4 July 2010
14:00

Germany	5–1	Netherlands
Fuchs 14'; Fürste 19', 61', 70'; Zeller 20'	Report	Jenniskens 66'

Umpires:
Satoshi Kondo (JPN)
Peter Wright (RSA)

== Statistics ==
=== Final standings ===
1. Germany
2. Japan
3. Netherlands
4. India

=== Goalscorers ===
There were 44 goals scored in 6 matches, for an average of 7.33 goals per match.

5 goals

- (Germany) Christopher Zeller

4 goals

- (Germany) Moritz Fürste
- (Japan) Kazuhiro Tsubouchi

3 goals

- (India) Sandeep Singh

2 goals

- (Germany) Florian Fuchs
- (Japan) Kenji Kitazato
- (Japan) Hiroki Sakamoto
- (Netherlands) Mink van der Weerden

1 goal

- (Germany) Oskar Deecke
- (Germany) Christoph Menke
- (Germany) Jan-Marco Montag
- (Germany) Maximilian Müller
- (India) Mohammad Amir Khan
- (India) Dhananjay Mahadik
- (India) Danish Mujtaba
- (India) Bharat Singh
- (India) Dharamvir Singh
- (India) Rajpal Singh
- (India) Ravi Pal Singh
- (Japan) Katsuyoshi Nagasawa
- (Japan) Ippei Ono
- (Netherlands) Jeroen Hertzberger
- (Netherlands) Rogier Hofman
- (Netherlands) Tim Jenniskens
- (Netherlands) Constantijn Jonker
- (Netherlands) Robbert Kempermann
- (Netherlands) Klaas Vermeulen
- (Netherlands) Bob de Voogd
