= 2015 Men's Hockey Hamburg Masters =

Tournament details
- Host country: Germany
- City: Hamburg
- Teams: 4
- Venue(s): Club an der Alster

Final positions
- Champions: Germany (2nd title)
- Runner-up: Belgium
- Third place: England

Tournament statistics
- Matches played: 6
- Goals scored: 32 (5.33 per match)
- Top scorer(s): (Belgium) Tom Boon (England) Ashley Jackson (Spain) Pau Quemada (4 goals)

The 2015 Men's Hockey Hamburg Masters was the twentieth edition of the Hamburg Masters, an international men's field hockey tournament, consisting of a series of test matches. It was held in Hamburg, Germany, from July 30 to August 2, 2015, and featured four of the top nations in men's field hockey.

== Competition format ==
The tournament featured the national teams of Belgium, England, Spain, and the hosts, Germany, competing in a round-robin format, with each team playing each other once. Three points were awarded for a win, one for a draw, and none for a loss.

Country	June 2015 FIH Ranking	Best World Cup Finish	Best Olympic Games Finish
Belgium	4	Fifth Place (2014)	Third Place (1920)
England	5	Runners-up (1986)	Champions (1920, 1988)
Germany	3	Champions (2006, 2010)	Champions (1992, 2008, 2012)
Spain	11	Runners-up (1971, 1998)	Runners-up (1980, 1996, 2008)

== Results ==
Pos	Team	Pld	W	D	L	GF	GA	GD	Pts	Result
1	Germany (H)	3	3	0	0	10	5	+5	9	Tournament Champion
2	Belgium	3	1	1	1	9	9	0	4	
3	England	3	1	1	1	6	6	0	4	
4	Spain	3	0	0	3	7	12	−5	0	

Source: FIH
Rules for classification: 1) Points; 2) Goal difference; 3) Goals scored; 4) Games won; 5) Head-to-head.
(H) Hosts

=== Matches ===
30 July 2015
15:00

Belgium	3–3	England
Boon 26', 48'; Dockier 55'	Report	Jackson 25', 33', 60'

Umpires:
Luis Martínez (ESP)
Coen van Bunge (NED)

30 July 2015
19:30

Spain	3–5	Germany
Quemada 1', 31'; Terraza 54'	Report	Miltkau 1', 50'; Wesley 17'; Oruz 24'; Grambusch 45'

Umpires:
Tim Benford (ENG)
Sébastien Michielsen (BEL)

1 August 2015
14:15

Spain	2–4	Belgium
Quemada 51', 59'	Report	Hendrickx 12'; Van Aubel 14', 23'; Boon 38'

Umpires:
Tim Benford (ENG)
Ben Göntgen (GER)

1 August 2015
16:30

Germany	1–0	England
Fuchs 5'	Report

Umpires:
Luis Martínez (ESP)
Coen van Bunge (NED)

2 August 2015
12:00

England	3–2	Spain
Ward 6', 57'; Jackson 37'	Report	Salles 5'; Casasayas 12'

Umpires:
Ben Göntgen (GER)
Sébastien Michielsen (BEL)

2 August 2015
14:15

Belgium	2–4	Germany
Boccard 20'; Boon 34'	Report	Windfeder 15+'; Oruz 30'; Butt 40'; Rühr 56'

Umpires:
Coen van Bunge (NED)
Tim Benford (ENG)

== Statistics ==
=== Goalscorers ===
There were 32 goals scored in 6 matches, for an average of 5.33 goals per match.

4 goals

- (Belgium) Tom Boon
- (England) Ashley Jackson
- (Spain) Pau Quemada

2 goals

- (Belgium) Florent van Aubel
- (England) Samuel Ward
- (Germany) Marco Miltkau
- (Germany) Timur Oruz

1 goal

- (Belgium) Gauthier Boccard
- (Belgium) Sébastien Dockier
- (Belgium) Alexander Hendrickx
- (Germany) Linus Butt
- (Germany) Florian Fuchs
- (Germany) Mats Grambusch
- (Germany) Christopher Rühr
- (Germany) Christopher Wesley
- (Germany) Lukas Windfeder
- (Spain) Álex Casasayas
- (Spain) Marc Salles
- (Spain) Manel Terraza

Source: FIH
