= 2014 Men's Hockey Düsseldorf Masters =

Tournament details
- Host country: Germany
- City: Düsseldorf
- Teams: 4
- Venue(s): DSD Düsseldorf

Final positions
- Champions: Belgium (1st title)
- Runner-up: Netherlands
- Third place: Germany

Tournament statistics
- Matches played: 6
- Goals scored: 27 (4.5 per match)
- Top scorer(s): (Netherlands) Mink van der Weerden (5 goals)

The 2014 Men's Hockey Düsseldorf Masters was the nineteenth edition of the Hamburg Masters, consisting of a series of test matches. It was held in Düsseldorf, Germany, from May 15 to 18, 2014, and featured four of the top nations in men's field hockey.

== Competition format ==
The tournament featured the national teams of Belgium, England, the Netherlands, and the hosts, Germany, competing in a round-robin format, with each team playing each other once. Three points were awarded for a win, one for a draw, and none for a loss.

Country	May 2014 FIH Ranking	Best World Cup Finish	Best Olympic Games Finish
Belgium	5	Eighth Place (1973)	Third Place (1920)
England	4	Runners-up (1986)	Champions (1920, 1988)
Germany	2	Champions (2006, 2010)	Champions (1992, 2008, 2012)
Netherlands	3	Champions (1973, 1990, 1998)	Champions (1996, 2000)

== Results ==
Pos	Team	Pld	W	D	L	GF	GA	GD	Pts	Result
1	Belgium	3	2	1	0	7	5	+2	7	Tournament Champion
2	Netherlands	3	2	0	1	8	6	+2	6	
3	Germany (H)	3	0	2	1	7	8	−1	2	
4	England	3	0	1	2	5	8	−3	1	

Source: FIH
Rules for classification: 1) Points; 2) Goal difference; 3) Goals scored; 4) Games won; 5) Head-to-head.
(H) Hosts

=== Matches ===
15 May 2014
16:30

Netherlands	3–1	England
Van der Weerden 21', 51'; Bakker 31'	Report	Mantell 39'

Umpires:
Christian Blasch (GER)
Michael Pontus (BEL)

15 May 2014
18:45

Germany	2–2	Belgium
Matania 7'; Zeller 17'	Report	Boon 6'; Gougnard 46'

Umpires:
Roel van Eert (NED)
Marcin Grochal (POL)

17 May 2014
13:00

Netherlands	1–2	Belgium
Galema 28'	Report	Cosyns 13'; Stockbroekx 20'

Umpires:
Dave Dowdall (ENG)
Christian Blasch (GER)

17 May 2014
15:30

Germany	2–2	England
Stralkowski 39', 46'	Report	Jackson 51'; Shingles 63'

Umpires:
Michael Pontus (BEL)
Marcin Grochal (POL)

18 May 2014
12:30

Belgium	3–2	England
Dockier 17'; Dohmen 48'; Van Aubel 63'	Report	Lewers 17'; Jackson 68'

Umpires:
Christian Blasch (GER)
Roel van Eert (NED)

18 May 2014
15:00

Germany	3–4	Netherlands
Rühr 6'; Fuchs 30', 66'	Report	Van der Weerden 26', 45', 64'; Van Ass 53'

Umpires:
Dave Dowdall (ENG)
Marcin Grochal (POL)

== Statistics ==
=== Goalscorers ===
There were 27 goals scored in 6 matches, for an average of 4.5 goals per match.

5 goals

- (Netherlands) Mink van der Weerden

2 goals

- (England) Ashley Jackson
- (Germany) Florian Fuchs
- (Germany) Thilo Stralkowski

1 goal

- (Belgium) Tom Boon
- (Belgium) Tanguy Cosyns
- (Belgium) Sébastien Dockier
- (Belgium) John-John Dohmen
- (Belgium) Simon Gougnard
- (Belgium) Emmanuel Stockbroekx
- (Belgium) Florent van Aubel
- (England) Iain Lewers
- (England) Simon Mantell
- (England) Dan Shingles
- (Germany) Tobias Matania
- (Germany) Christopher Rühr
- (Germany) Christopher Zeller
- (Netherlands) Billy Bakker
- (Netherlands) Jelle Galema
- (Netherlands) Seve van Ass

Source: FIH
