= 2013 Men's Hockey Hamburg Masters =

Tournament details
- Host country: Germany
- City: Hamburg
- Teams: 4

Final positions
- Champions: Germany (1st title)
- Runner-up: Netherlands
- Third place: England

Tournament statistics
- Matches played: 6
- Goals scored: 33 (5.5 per match)
- Top scorer(s): (Netherlands) Constantijn Jonker (6 goals)

The 2013 Men's Hockey Hamburg Masters was the eighteenth edition of the Hamburg Masters, consisting of a series of test matches. It was held in Hamburg, Germany, from July 25 to 28, 2013, and featured four of the top nations in men's field hockey.

== Competition format ==
The tournament featured the national teams of England, Ireland, the Netherlands, and the hosts, Germany, competing in a round-robin format, with each team playing each other once. Three points were awarded for a win, one for a draw, and none for a loss.

Country	July 2013 FIH Ranking	Best World Cup Finish	Best Olympic Games Finish
England	4	Runners-up (1986)	Champions (1920, 1988)
Germany	1	Champions (2006, 2010)	Champions (1992, 2008, 2012)
Ireland	15	Twelfth Place (1978, 1990)	Runners-Up (1908)
Netherlands	3	Champions (1973, 1990, 1998)	Champions (1996, 2000)

== Results ==
Pos	Team	Pld	W	D	L	GF	GA	GD	Pts	Result
1	Germany (H)	3	2	1	0	14	3	+11	7	Tournament Champion
2	Netherlands	3	2	1	0	12	3	+9	7	
3	England	3	1	0	2	5	14	−9	3	
4	Ireland	3	0	0	3	2	13	−11	0	

Source: FIH
Rules for classification: 1) Points; 2) Goal difference; 3) Goals scored; 4) Games won; 5) Head-to-head.
(H) Hosts

=== Matches ===
25 July 2013
12:30

Netherlands	6–1	England
Jonker 18', 32', 49'; Kempermann 26'; Van Ass 41'; Hofman 55'	Report	Cheesman 67'

Umpires:
Geoff Conn (IRE)
Diego Estebanez (ESP)

25 July 2013
15:00

Germany	6–0	Ireland
Miltkau 24', 30'; Deecke 36'; Fuchs 46'; Stralkowsi 48'; Grambusch 70'	Report

Umpires:
Tim Benford (ENG)
Michiel Otten (NED)

27 July 2013
14:00

Netherlands	4–0	Ireland
Jonker 16', 37', 57'; Van der Weerden 46'	Report

Umpires:
Tim Benford (ENG)
David Sweetman (SCO)

27 July 2013
16:30

England	1–6	Germany
Middleton 55'	Report	Deecke 14'; Grambusch 25'; Fuchs 39'; Miltkau 42', 58'; Arnold 66'

Umpires:
Geoff Conn (IRE)
Diego Estebanez (ESP)

28 July 2013
12:00

Ireland	2–3	England
Good 48'; Harte 56'	Report	Carson 25'; Cheesman 51'; Catlin 65'

Umpires:
Michiel Otten (NED)
Diego Estebanez (ESP)

28 July 2013
14:30

Germany	2–2	Netherlands
Stralkowski 52'; Rühr 70'	Report	Van der Weerden 25'; Baart 67'

Umpires:
Geoff Conn (IRE)
David Sweetman (SCO)

== Statistics ==
=== Goalscorers ===
There were 33 goals scored in 6 matches, for an average of 5.5 goals per match.

6 goals

- (Netherlands) Constantijn Jonker

4 goals

- (Germany) Marco Miltkau

2 goals

- (England) Darren Cheesman
- (Germany) Oskar Deecke
- (Germany) Florian Fuchs
- (Germany) Mats Grambusch
- (Germany) Thilo Stralkowski
- (Netherlands) Mink van der Weerden

1 goal

- (England) Tom Carson
- (England) Nicholas Catlin
- (England) Barry Middleton
- (Germany) Pilt Arnold
- (Germany) Christopher Rühr
- (Ireland) Kyle Good
- (Ireland) Conor Harte
- (Netherlands) Sander Baart
- (Netherlands) Rogier Hofman
- (Netherlands) Robbert Kempermann
- (Netherlands) Seve van Ass

Source: FIH
