= 2009 Men's Hockey Hamburg Masters =

Tournament details
- Host country: Germany
- City: Hamburg
- Teams: 4
- Venue(s): Uhlenhorster HC

Final positions
- Champions: Australia (2nd title)
- Runner-up: Germany
- Third place: Netherlands

Tournament statistics
- Matches played: 6
- Goals scored: 43 (7.17 per match)
- Top scorer(s): (Germany) Christopher Zeller (5 goals)

The 2009 Men's Hockey Hamburg Masters was the fifteenth edition of the Hamburg Masters, consisting of a series of test matches. It was held in Hamburg, Germany, from 4–7 June 2009, and featured four of the top nations in men's field hockey.

== Competition format ==
The tournament featured the national teams of Australia, England, the Netherlands, and the hosts, Germany, competing in a round-robin format, with each team playing each other once. Three points were awarded for a win, one for a draw, and none for a loss.

Country	2009 FIH Ranking	Best World Cup Finish	Best Olympic Games Finish
Australia	2	Champions (1986)	Champions (2004)
England	6	Runners-Up (1986)	Champions (1920, 1988)
Germany	1	Champions (2002, 2006)	Champions (1992, 2008)
Netherlands	4	Champions (1973, 1990, 1998)	Champions (1996, 2000)

== Officials ==
The following umpires were appointed by the International Hockey Federation to officiate the tournament:

- Christian Bläsch (GER)
- Henrik Ehlers (AUT)
- Gijs Hofman (NED)
- Andrew Kennedy (ENG)
- Scott O'Brien (AUS)

== Results ==
All times are local (Central European Summer Time).

=== Pool ===
Pos	Team	Pld	W	D	L	GF	GA	GD	Pts	Result
1	Australia	3	3	0	0	14	6	+8	9	Tournament Champion
2	Germany (H)	3	2	0	1	13	9	+4	6	
3	Netherlands	3	1	0	2	10	12	−2	3	
4	England	3	0	0	3	6	16	−10	0	

Source: Deutscher Hockey-Bund
Rules for classification: 1) Points; 2) Goal difference; 3) Goals scored; 4) Games won; 5) Head-to-head.
(H) Hosts

=== Fixtures ===
4 June 2009
16:30

Netherlands	2–3	Australia
Weusthof 29', 64'	Report	Doerner 21', 42'; Ockenden 24'

Umpires:
Christian Bläsch (GER)
Andrew Kennedy (ENG)

4 June 2009
18:45

Germany	6–0	England
Witthaus 5'; C. Zeller 22', 70'; Montag 43'; Wesley 53'; Menke 65'	Report

Umpires:
Henrik Ehlers (AUT)
Gijs Hofman (NED)

6 June 2009
14:00

Australia	5–2	England
Ciriello 24'; Dwyer 35'; Turner 40', 44'; Abbott 67'	Report	Jackson 52', 56'

Umpires:
Christian Bläsch (GER)
Henrik Ehlers (AUT)

6 June 2009
16:00

Germany	5–3	Netherlands
Wesley 32'; P. Zeller 48'; Witthaus 58'; C. Zeller 59'; Wösch 68'	Report	Hertzberger 30'; R. Brouwer 41'; De Nooijer 70'

Umpires:
Scott O'Brien (AUS)
Andrew Kennedy (ENG)

7 June 2009
12:00

Netherlands	5–4	England
Evers 4'; Hofman 48'; Weusthof 58', 67'; Balkestein 60'	Report	Middleton 11', 44'; Jackson 25'; Daly 31'

Umpires:
Christian Bläsch (GER)
Scott O'Brien (AUS)

7 June 2009
14:30

Australia	6–2	Germany
Paterson 7', 69'; Ockenden 16'; Doerner 30'; Orchard 55'; Dwyer 62'	Report	C. Zeller 45', 50'

Umpires:
Gijs Hofman (NED)
Henrik Ehlers (AUT)

== Statistics ==
=== Final standings ===
1. Australia
2. Germany
3. Netherlands
4. England

=== Goalscorers ===
There were 43 goals scored in 6 matches, for an average of 7.17 goals per match.

5 goals

- (Germany) Christopher Zeller

4 goals

- (Netherlands) Roderick Weusthof

3 goals

- (Australia) Luke Doerner
- (England) Ashley Jackson

2 goals

- (Australia) Jamie Dwyer
- (Australia) Edward Ockenden
- (Australia) Mark Paterson
- (Australia) Glenn Turner
- (England) Barry Middleton
- (Germany) Christopher Wesley
- (Germany) Matthias Witthaus

1 goal

- (Australia) Desmond Abbott
- (Australia) Christopher Ciriello
- (Australia) Simon Orchard
- (England) Matthew Daly
- (Germany) Christoph Menke
- (Germany) Jan-Marco Montag
- (Germany) Florian Wösch
- (Germany) Philipp Zeller
- (Netherlands) Marcel Balkestein
- (Netherlands) Ronald Brouwer
- (Netherlands) Floris Evers
- (Netherlands) Rogier Hofman
- (Netherlands) Jeroen Hertzberger
- (Netherlands) Teun de Nooijer
