= 2016 Men's Hockey Düsseldorf Masters =

Tournament details
- Host country: Germany
- City: Düsseldorf
- Teams: 4
- Venue(s): DSD Düsseldorf

Final positions
- Champions: Germany (3rd title)
- Runner-up: Great Britain
- Third place: Netherlands

Tournament statistics
- Matches played: 6
- Goals scored: 24 (4 per match)
- Top scorer(s): 6 players (see list below) (2 goals)

The 2018 Men's Hockey Düsseldorf Masters was the twenty-first edition of the Hamburg Masters, an international men's field hockey tournament, consisting of a series of test matches. It was held in Düsseldorf, Germany, from July 14 to 17, 2016, and featured four of the top nations in men's field hockey.

== Competition format ==
The tournament featured the national teams of Belgium, Great Britain, the Netherlands, and the hosts, Germany, competing in a round-robin format, with each team playing each other once. Three points were awarded for a win, one for a draw, and none for a loss.

Country	June 2016 FIH Ranking	Best World Cup Finish	Best Olympic Games Finish
Belgium	6	Fifth Place (2014)	Third Place (1920)
Germany	3	Champions (2006, 2010)	Champions (1992, 2008, 2012)
Great Britain	4	Runners-up (1986)	Champions (1920, 1988)
Netherlands	2	Champions (1973, 1990, 1998)	Champions (1996, 2000)

== Results ==
Pos	Team	Pld	W	D	L	GF	GA	GD	Pts	Result
1	Germany (H)	3	2	1	0	7	5	+2	7	Tournament Champion
2	Great Britain	3	1	2	0	6	3	+3	5	
3	Netherlands	3	1	0	2	5	8	−3	3	
4	Belgium	3	0	1	2	6	8	−2	1	

Source: FIH
Rules for classification: 1) Points; 2) Goal difference; 3) Goals scored; 4) Games won; 5) Head-to-head.
(H) Hosts

=== Matches ===
14 July 2016
13:30

Netherlands	3–2	Belgium
Pruijser 44'; De Voogd 51'; Van der Weerden 59'	Report	Charlier 45'; Boon 56'

Umpires:
Johannes Berneth (GER)
Martin Madden (SCO)

14 July 2016
18:30

Great Britain	1–1	Germany
Condon 23'	Report	Wesley 20'

Umpires:
Coen van Bunge (NED)
Javed Shaikh (IND)

16 July 2016
14:00

Great Britain	3–0	Netherlands
Ward 12', 43'; Weir 48'	Report

Umpires:
Sébastien Duterme (BEL)
Javed Shaikh (IND)

16 July 2016
16:30

Belgium	2–3	Germany
Charlier 15'; Van Aubel 33'	Report	Fürste 24', 40'; Oruz 53'

Umpires:
Martin Madden (SCO)
Coen van Bunge (NED)

17 July 2016
11:30

Belgium	2–2	Great Britain
Van Strydonck 15'; Dockier 22'	Report	Mantell 50', 60'

Umpires:
Javed Shaikh (IND)
Johannes Berneth (GER)

17 July 2016
14:00

Netherlands	2–3	Germany
Van der Weerden 43'; Bakker 45'	Report	Butt 3'; Oruz 6'; Fuchs 9'

Umpires:
Sébastien Duterme (BEL)
Martin Madden (SCO)

== Statistics ==
=== Goalscorers ===
There have been 24 goals scored in 6 matches, for an average of 4 goals per match.

2 goals

- (Belgium) Cédric Charlier
- (Germany) Moritz Fürste
- (Germany) Timur Oruz
- (United Kingdom) Simon Mantell
- (United Kingdom) Samuel Ward
- (Netherlands) Mink van der Weerden

1 goal

- (Belgium) Tom Boon
- (Belgium) Sébastien Dockier
- (Belgium) Florent van Aubel
- (Belgium) Elliot van Strydonck
- (Germany) Linus Butt
- (Germany) Florian Fuchs
- (Germany) Christopher Wesley
- (United Kingdom) David Condon
- (United Kingdom) Henry Weir
- (Netherlands) Billy Bakker
- (Netherlands) Mirco Pruijser
- (Netherlands) Bob de Voogd

Source: FIH
