= 2012 Men's Hockey Düsseldorf Masters =

Tournament details
- Host country: Germany
- City: Düsseldorf
- Teams: 4

Final positions
- Champions: Germany (12th title)
- Runner-up: Belgium
- Third place: Netherlands

Tournament statistics
- Matches played: 6
- Goals scored: 26 (4.33 per match)
- Top scorer(s): (Germany) Christopher Zeller (6 goals)

The 2012 Men's Hockey Düsseldorf Masters was the seventeenth edition of the Hamburg Masters, consisting of a series of test matches. It was held in Düsseldorf, Germany, from 21 to 24 June 2012, and featured four of the top nations in men's field hockey.

== Competition format ==
The tournament featured the national teams of Belgium, the Netherlands, Spain, and the hosts, Germany, competing in a round-robin format, with each team playing each other once. Three points were awarded for a win, one for a draw, and none for a loss.

Country	December 2011 FIH Ranking	Best World Cup Finish	Best Olympic Games Finish
Belgium	11	Eighth Place (1973)	Third Place (1920)
Germany	2	Champions (2002, 2006)	Champions (1992, 2008)
Netherlands	3	Champions (1973, 1990, 1998)	Champions (1996, 2000)
Spain	5	Runners-Up (1971, 1998)	Runners-Up (1980, 1996, 2008)

== Officials ==
The following umpires were appointed by the International Hockey Federation to officiate the tournament:

- Christian Bläsch (GER)
- Roel van Eert (NED)
- Colin Hutchinson (IRE)
- Eduardo Lizana (ESP)
- Gregory Uyttenhove (BEL)

== Results ==
All times are local (Central European Summer Time).

=== Pool ===
Pos	Team	Pld	W	D	L	GF	GA	GD	Pts	Result
1	Germany (H)	3	2	1	0	12	8	+4	7	Tournament Champion
2	Belgium	3	1	1	1	4	6	−2	4	
3	Netherlands	3	1	0	2	5	5	0	3	
4	Spain	3	1	0	2	5	7	−2	3	

Source: FIH
Rules for classification: 1) Points; 2) Goal difference; 3) Goals scored; 4) Games won; 5) Head-to-head.
(H) Hosts

=== Fixtures ===
21 June 2012
16:30

Netherlands	3–0	Belgium
Weusthof 19', 40'; Verga 46'	Report

Umpires:
Colin Hutchinson (IRE)
Christian Bläsch (GER)

21 June 2012
18:45

Germany	6–3	Spain
Stralkowski 27'; C. Zeller 35', 40', 61'; Fuchs 42', 60'	Report	Quemada 29'; Freixa 52'; Amat 70'

Umpires:
Roel van Eert (NED)
Gregory Uyttenhove (BEL)

23 June 2012
13:00

Belgium	3–3	Germany
Boccard 11'; Reckinger 35'; Luycx 64'	Report	Witthaus 18'; C. Zeller 22'; Montag 29'

Umpires:
Eduardo Lizana (ESP)
Colin Hutchinson (IRE)

23 June 2012
15:30

Netherlands	0–2	Spain
	Report	Amat 5'; Freixa 53'

Umpires:
Christian Bläsch (GER)
Gregory Uyttenhove (BEL)

24 June 2012
12:30

Belgium	1–0	Spain
Luycx 23'	Report

Umpires:
Christian Bläsch (GER)
Roel van Eert (NED)

24 June 2012
15:00

Germany	3–2	Netherlands
C. Zeller 23', 44'; Fuchs 60'	Report	Bakker 5'; De Wijn 7'

Umpires:
Colin Hutchinson (IRE)
Eduardo Lizana (ESP)

== Statistics ==
=== Final standings ===
1. Germany
2. Belgium
3. Netherlands
4. Spain

=== Goalscorers ===
There were 26 goals scored in 6 matches, for an average of 4.33 goals per match.

6 goals

- (Germany) Christopher Zeller

3 goals

- (Germany) Florian Fuchs

2 goals

- (Belgium) Maxime Luycx
- (Netherlands) Roderick Weusthof
- (Spain) Pol Amat
- (Spain) Santiago Freixa

1 goal

- (Belgium) Gauthier Boccard
- (Belgium) Xavier Reckinger
- (Germany) Jan-Marco Montag
- (Germany) Thilo Stralkowski
- (Germany) Matthias Witthaus
- (Netherlands) Billy Bakker
- (Netherlands) Valentin Verga
- (Netherlands) Sander de Wijn
- (Spain) Pau Quemada
