= Iain Lewers =

Great Britain hockey international

Personal information
- Born: 5 January 1984 (age 42) Belfast, Northern Ireland
- Height: 183 cm (6 ft 0 in)
- Weight: 79 kg (174 lb)

Sport
- Sport: Field hockey
- Position: Defender/Midfielder
Senior career
Years	Team	Caps	Goals
199x–2007	Annadale	-	-
200x–200x	→ Ulster	-	-
2007–2010	HGC	-	-
2010–2011	Loughborough	-	-
2011–2014	East Grinstead	-	-
2014	→ Uttar Pradesh Wizards	-	-
2014–2017	Holcombe	-	-
2016–2017	→ Delhi Waveriders	-	-
2017–2019	Wimbledon	-	-
National team
Years	Team	Caps	Goals
2004–2008	Ireland	88	-
2011–2016	Great Britain	72	(4)
2011–2016	England	74	(7)
Medal record
Representing England
Commonwealth Games
Bronze medal – third place	2014 Glasgow	Team
European Championships
Bronze medal – third place	2011 Mönchengladbach	Team
World League
Bronze medal – third place	2014 New Delhi	Team

Iain Lewers (born 5 January 1984) is a former field hockey player from Northern Ireland who represented Ireland, England and Great Britain at international level. He represented Great Britain at the 2012 and 2016 Summer Olympics. He was also a member the England teams that won bronze medals at the 2011 Men's EuroHockey Nations Championship and 2014 Commonwealth Games. He also represented England at the 2013 and 2015 Men's EuroHockey Nations Championships and at the 2014 Men's Hockey World Cup. In both 2014 and 2015 Lewers was named the England/Great Britain Player of the Year by the Hockey Writers' Club.

== Early years and education ==
Lewers was educated at Cairnshill Primary School, Wellington College Belfast, and Ulster University where he gained a Bachelor's degree in Sports Science and Management.

== Club career ==
As a youth, Lewers played for Annadale. He was also a member of the Annadale team that won five Ulster Senior League titles between 2002–03 and 2006–07. Lewers also scored for Annadale in the 2006–07 Irish Senior Cup final as they lost 4–3 to Glenanne. His father, David Dewers, had played for Annadale in the 1984 Irish Senior Cup final. While playing for Annadale, Iain Lewers also represented Ulster at interprovincial level.

Between 2007 and 2010 Lewers played for HGC in the Hoofdklasse. Together with John Jermyn and Barry Middleton, he was a member of the HGC team that finished as runners up in the 2007–08 Euro Hockey League. He also helped HGC finish as runners-up in the 2009–10 Hoofdklasse.

Lewers played for Loughborough in the Men's England Hockey League from 2010 to 2011.

Lewers also played in the Hockey India League during 2014 for Uttar Pradesh Wizards. At the 2014 auction he was initially selected as a replacement. However, due to injuries he was subsequently called up to play the season. After his Summer in the Indian Hockey league, he moved from East Grinstead to Holcombe in September 2014 During the 2016 and 2017 seasons he played for Delhi Waveriders and then played for Wimbledon from 2017 to 2019.

== International ==
=== Ireland ===
Between 2004 and 2008 Lewers made 88 senior appearances for Ireland. He made his senior debut for Ireland in a 2004 Celtic Cup match against Wales. He had previously represented Ireland at under-16 and under-18 levels. He was a member of the Ireland team that won the 2005 Men's EuroHockey Nations Trophy. He also represented Ireland at the 2006 Men's Intercontinental Cup, the 2007 Men's EuroHockey Nations Championship, and at the 2008 Men's Field Hockey Olympic Qualifier. In July 2008 the Irish Hockey Association announced that Lewers was switching allegiances from Ireland to England/Great Britain.

=== Great Britain ===
Between 2011 and 2016 Lewers made 72 senior appearances for Great Britain. Having previously played for Ireland, Lewers had to wait for three years before he was eligible to play for Great Britain. He eventually made his Great Britain debut against Malaysia at the 2011 Sultan Azlan Shah Cup. He subsequently represented Great Britain at the 2012 and 2016 Summer Olympics

=== England ===
Between 2011 and 2016 Lewers made 74 senior appearances for England. He made his senior debut for England in June 2011 against Pakistan. He was subsequently a member the England teams that won bronze medals at the 2011 Men's EuroHockey Nations Championship and 2014 Commonwealth Games. He also represented England at the 2013 and 2015 Men's EuroHockey Nations Championships and at the 2014 Men's Hockey World Cup. In both 2014 and 2015 Lewers was named the England/Great Britain Player of the Year by the Hockey Writers' Club.

Tournaments	Place	Team
2005 Men's EuroHockey Nations Trophy	1st	Ireland
2006 Men's Intercontinental Cup	8th	Ireland
2007 Men's EuroHockey Nations Championship	7th	Ireland
2008 Men's Field Hockey Olympic Qualifier	4th	Ireland
2011 Sultan Azlan Shah Cup	3rd	Great Britain
2011 Men's EuroHockey Nations Championship	3rd place, bronze medalist(s)	England
2011 Men's Hockey Champions Trophy	6th	Great Britain
2012 Summer Olympics	4th	Great Britain
2012 Men's Hockey Champions Trophy	2nd	England
2012–13 Men's FIH Hockey World League Semifinals	3rd	England
2013 Men's EuroHockey Nations Championship	4th	England
2012–13 Men's FIH Hockey World League Final	3rd	England
2014 Men's Four Nations Cup	4th	England
2014 Men's Hockey World Cup	4th	England
2014 Men's Hockey Investec Cup	1st	England
2014 Commonwealth Games	3rd place, bronze medalist(s)	England
2014 Men's Hockey Champions Trophy	7th	England
2014–15 Men's FIH Hockey World League Semifinals	3rd	Great Britain
2014–15 Men's FIH Hockey World League Final	6th	Great Britain
2015 Men's EuroHockey Nations Championship	4th	England
2016 Men's Hockey Champions Trophy	4th	Great Britain
2016 Men's Four Nations Cup	2nd	Great Britain
2016 Summer Olympics	9th	Great Britain

== Personal life ==
Since 2012 Lewers has been in a relationship with Georgie Twigg, the England/Great Britain women's international. In 2019 they became engaged.

== Honours ==
Great Britain

- Men's Four Nations Cup
  - Runners up: 2016

England

- Men's Hockey Investec Cup
  - Winners: 2014
- Hockey Champions Trophy
  - Runners up: 2012

Ireland

- Men's EuroHockey Nations Trophy
  - Winners: 2005

HGC

- Euro Hockey League
  - Runners up: 2007–08
- Hoofdklasse
  - Runners up: 2009–10

Annadale

- Ulster Senior League
  - Winners: 2002–03, 2003–04, 2004–05, 2005–06, 2006–07
- Kirk Cup
  - Winners: 2003–04
- Irish Senior Cup
  - Runners Up: 2006–07
