= 2011 Men's Hockey Champions Trophy =

International Hockey tournament

- official logo

Tournament details
- Host country: New Zealand
- City: Auckland
- Teams: 8
- Venue: North Harbour Hockey Stadium

Final positions
- Champions: Australia (12th title)
- Runner-up: Spain
- Third place: Netherlands

Tournament statistics
- Matches played: 24
- Goals scored: 124 (5.17 per match)
- Top scorer: (Australia) Jamie Dwyer (7 goals)
- Best player: (Spain) Santi Freixa

The 2011 Men's Hockey Champions Trophy, officially known as the Owen G Glenn FIH Men's Champions Trophy, was the 33rd edition of the Champions Trophy men's field hockey tournament. The International Hockey Federation (FIH) confirmed India as the host country, and announced New Delhi as the host city on February 4, 2011. The tournament dates were December 3 to December 11, 2011. However, on September 6, 2011, the FIH announced that India would no longer host the tournament due to a governance issue, and announced Auckland, New Zealand, as the new host on September 13, 2011 with the same time schedule. The tournament was held at North Harbour Hockey Stadium.

Australia won the title for the fourth consecutive and twelfth time total by defeating Spain 1–0 in the final.

== Host city change ==
For the 33rd edition of the Hockey Champions Trophy, India was elected to host the tournament by the FIH on February 4, 2011. But due to an ongoing governance issue with the Indian Hockey Federation, the FIH announced that India would no longer host the competition, instead; Auckland, New Zealand hosted the tournament. New Zealand businessman Owen Glenn was instrumental in gaining the hosting rights for New Zealand. He funded Hockey New Zealand to gain the hosting rights.

The tournament was expected to have a television audience of approximately 38 million people, the largest hockey event held in New Zealand to that point, and was forecast to inject around $1 million to the local economy.

== Qualification ==
The new qualification criteria were determined by International Hockey Federation (FIH), as follows:

- Australia (2010 World Cup Champions)
- Germany (2008 Olympics Champions and 2010 World Cup Runners-up)
- Netherlands (Third in 2010 World Cup)
- Great Britain (Fourth in 2010 World Cup as England)
- Spain (Fifth in 2010 World Cup)
- Pakistan (Invitational)
- South Korea (Invitational)
- New Zealand (Host nation)

== Results ==
All times are New Zealand Daylight Time (UTC+13:00)

=== First round ===
==== Pool A ====
Pos	Team	Pld	W	D	L	GF	GA	GD	Pts	Qualification
1	Australia	3	3	0	0	13	4	+9	9	Medal Round
2	Spain	3	2	0	1	14	6	+8	6	Medal Round
3	Great Britain	3	1	0	2	4	13	−9	3	
4	Pakistan	3	0	0	3	4	12	−8	0	

Source: FIH
Rules for classification: 1) Points; 2) Matches won; 3) Goal difference; 4) Goals for; 5) Head-to-head result.

3 December 2011
16:05

Australia	3–2	Spain
Dwyer 10', 42'; Abbott 62'	Report	Dabanch 25'; Tubau 27'

Umpires:
Hamish Jamson (ENG)
Germán Montes de Oca (ARG)

3 December 2011
18:05

Great Britain	2–1	Pakistan
Pearn 45'; S. Mantell 65'	Report	Imran 31'

Umpires:
Nigel Iggo (NZL)
Kim Hong-lae (KOR)

5 December 2011
10:05

Great Britain	1–4	Australia
S. Mantell 55'	Report	Butturini 6'; Gohdes 22'; Dwyer 57'; Doerner 68'

Umpires:
Nigel Iggo (NZL)
Peter Wright (RSA)

5 December 2011
12:05

Spain	4–2	Pakistan
Freixa 2'; Dabanch 25'; Quemada 57', 65'	Report	Abbasi 9'; Abbas 41'

Umpires:
Murray Grime (AUS)
Satoshi Kondo (JPN)

6 December 2011
12:05

Spain	8–1	Great Britain
Tubau 24', 67'; Quemada 25'; Freixa 29', 66'; Dabanch 31'; Fernández 44'; Oliva 70'	Report	Middleton 23'

Umpires:
Kim Hong-lae (KOR)
Germán Montes de Oca (ARG)

6 December 2011
16:05

Australia	6–1	Pakistan
Dwyer 22', 45', 48'; Ockenden 31'; Doerner 40'; Paterson 53'	Report	Tousiq 64'

Umpires:
Nathan Stagno (GIB)
Satoshi Kondo (JPN)

==== Pool B ====
Pos	Team	Pld	W	D	L	GF	GA	GD	Pts	Qualification
1	Netherlands	3	2	1	0	8	5	+3	7	Medal Round
2	New Zealand	3	1	1	1	10	6	+4	4	Medal Round
3	Germany	3	1	1	1	7	7	0	4	
4	South Korea	3	0	1	2	4	11	−7	1	

Source: FIH
Rules for classification: 1) Points; 2) Matches won; 3) Goal difference; 4) Goals for; 5) Head-to-head result.

3 December 2011
14:05

Germany	2–1	New Zealand
Stralkowski 9'; Wesley 59'	Report	Inglis 14'

Umpires:
Murray Grime (AUS)
Peter Wright (RSA)

3 December 2011
18:05

Netherlands	2–0	South Korea
Taekema 7'; Bakker 54'	Report

Umpires:
Nathan Stagno (GIB)
Gareth Greenfield (NZL)

5 December 2011
14:05

Netherlands	3–2	Germany
Bakker 12'; Hertzberger 32'; Hofman 66'	Report	Matania 16'; Menke 21'

Umpires:
Nathan Stagno (GIB)
Haider Rasool (PAK)

5 December 2011
16:05

South Korea	1–6	New Zealand
Cho 33'	Report	McAleese 26', 36'; Burrows 34'; Wilson 52'; Neal 63'; Hayward 70'

Umpires:
Hamish Jamson (ENG)
Gareth Greenfield (NZL)

6 December 2011
14:05

South Korea	3–3	Germany
You 48'; Kim Y. 54'; Seo 64'	Report	Fuchs 31'; Montag 34'; Matania 67'

Umpires:
Haider Rasool (PAK)
Nigel Iggo (NZL)

6 December 2011
18:05

Netherlands	3–3	New Zealand
Bakker 28'; Hertzberger 29'; Taekema 48'	Report	Hilton 53'; Burrows 55'; Couzins 66'

Umpires:
Peter Wright (RSA)
Hamish Jamson (ENG)

=== Second round ===
==== Pool C ====
Pos	Team	Pld	W	D	L	GF	GA	GD	Pts	Qualification
1	Australia	3	3	0	0	9	5	+4	9	Final
2	Spain	3	2	0	1	8	6	+2	6	Final
3	New Zealand	3	0	1	2	6	8	−2	1	
4	Netherlands	3	0	1	2	6	10	−4	1	

Source: FIH
Rules for classification: 1) Points; 2) Matches won; 3) Goal difference; 4) Goals for; 5) Head-to-head result.

8 December 2011
16:05

Netherlands	2−4	Australia
Bakker 47'; Verga 69'	Report	Ciriello 29'; Gohdes 50', 61'; Dwyer 64'

Umpires:
Germán Montes de Oca (ARG)
Nigel Iggo (NZL)

8 December 2011
18:05

Spain	3−2	New Zealand
R. Alegre 32'; Tubau 42'; D. Alegre 66'	Report	Hayward 16'; Hilton 36'

Umpires:
Kim Hong-lae (KOR)
Murray Grime (AUS)

10 December 2011
16:05

Netherlands	1−3	Spain
De Voogd 33'	Report	Tubau 2'; Oliva 25'; Dabanch 51'

Umpires:
Hamish Jamson (ENG)
Kim Hong-lae (KOR)

10 December 2011
18:05

Australia	2–1	New Zealand
Abbott 14'; Ockenden 58'	Report	Hayward 31'

Umpires:
Nathan Stagno (GIB)
Germán Montes de Oca (ARG)

==== Pool D ====
Pos	Team	Pld	W	D	L	GF	GA	GD	Pts
1	Germany	3	2	1	0	10	4	+6	7
2	Great Britain	3	2	0	1	7	6	+1	6
3	Pakistan	3	1	0	2	7	9	−2	3
4	South Korea	3	0	1	2	8	13	−5	1

Source: FIH
Rules for classification: 1) Points; 2) Matches won; 3) Goal difference; 4) Goals for; 5) Head-to-head result.

8 December 2011
12:05

Pakistan	6−2	South Korea
Imran 15', 69'; Khan 16', 61'; W. Ahmad 63'; Rasool 63'	Report	Lee N. 7'; Nam 27'

Umpires:
Satoshi Kondo (JPN)
Peter Wright (RSA)

8 December 2011
14:05

Great Britain	1−2	Germany
Kirkham 22'	Report	Zwicker 4'; Montag 70+'

Umpires:
Haider Rasool (PAK)
Gareth Greenfield (NZL)

10 December 2011
12:05

Germany	5−0	Pakistan
Matania 13'; Montag 26'; Weß 42'; Fuchs 49'; Fürk 62'	Report

Umpires:
Murray Grime (AUS)
Gareth Greenfield (NZL)

10 December 2011
14:05

Great Britain	4−3	South Korea
Tindall 47', 66'; Jackson 60'; Pearn 68'	Report	You 31'; Seo 45'; Nam 67'

Umpires:
Satoshi Kondo (JPN)
Haider Rasool (PAK)

=== Classification ===
==== Seventh and eighth place ====
11 December 2011
10:35

Pakistan	5–4 (a.e.t.)	South Korea
Rizwan Sr. 6', 75'; Imran 27'; Tousiq 34'; Khan 44'	Report	Seo 5'; Jang K. 21'; You 54', 62'

Umpires:
Peter Wright (RSA)
Gareth Greenfield (NZL)

==== Fifth and sixth place ====
11 December 2011
13:05

Germany	1–0	Great Britain
Stralkowski 30'	Report

Umpires:
Nigel Iggo (NZL)
Murray Grime (AUS)

==== Third and fourth place ====
11 December 2011
15:35

New Zealand	3–5	Netherlands
Wilson 18'; Child 33'; Jenness 65'	Report	Hertzberger 5'; De Nooijer 28'; Van der Weerden 57'; De Voogd 67'; Bakker 69'

Umpires:
Nathan Stagno (GIB)
Germán Montes de Oca (ARG)

==== Final ====
11 December 2011
18:05

Australia	1–0	Spain
Ockenden 59'	Report

Umpires:
Hamish Jamson (ENG)
Kim Hong-lae (KOR)

== Awards ==
Player of the Tournament	Top Goalscorer	Goalkeeper of the Tournament	Fair Play Trophy
(Spain) Santi Freixa	(Australia) Jamie Dwyer	(New Zealand) Kyle Pontifex	Australia

== Statistics ==
=== Final standings ===
As per statistical convention in field hockey, matches decided in regular time are counted as wins and losses, while matches decided by penalty shoot-outs are counted as draws.

Pos	Team	Pld	W	D	L	GF	GA	GD	Pts	Final result
1st place, gold medalist(s)	Australia	6	6	0	0	20	7	+13	18	Gold Medal
2nd place, silver medalist(s)	Spain	6	4	0	2	20	10	+10	12	Silver Medal
3rd place, bronze medalist(s)	Netherlands	6	3	1	2	16	15	+1	10	Bronze Medal
4	New Zealand (H)	6	1	1	4	16	16	0	4	Fourth place
5	Germany	6	4	1	1	15	8	+7	13	Eliminated in group stage
6	Great Britain	6	2	0	4	9	19	−10	6	Eliminated in group stage
7	Pakistan	6	2	0	4	15	23	−8	6	Eliminated in group stage
8	South Korea	6	0	1	5	13	26	−13	1	Eliminated in group stage

Source: FIH
(H) Hosts

=== Goalscorers ===
There were 124 goals scored in 24 matches, for an average of 5.17 goals per match.

7 goals

- (Australia) Jamie Dwyer

5 goals

- (Netherlands) Billy Bakker
- (Spain) Eduardo Tubau

4 goals

- (Pakistan) Muhammad Imran
- (South Korea) You Hyo-Sik
- (Spain) Gabriel Dabanch

3 goals

- (Australia) Matthew Gohdes
- (Australia) Edward Ockenden
- (Germany) Tobias Matania
- (Germany) Jan-Marco Montag
- (Netherlands) Jeroen Hertzberger
- (New Zealand) Andrew Hayward
- (Pakistan) Abdul Haseem Khan
- (South Korea) Seo Jong-Ho
- (Spain) Santiago Freixa
- (Spain) Pau Quemada

2 goals

- (Australia) Desmond Abbott
- (Australia) Luke Doerner
- (Germany) Florian Fuchs
- (Germany) Thilo Stralkowski
- (United Kingdom) Simon Mantell
- (United Kingdom) Mark Pearn
- (United Kingdom) James Tindall
- (Netherlands) Taeke Taekema
- (Netherlands) Bob de Voogd
- (New Zealand) Phil Burrows
- (New Zealand) Blair Hilton
- (New Zealand) Shea McAleese
- (New Zealand) Nicholas Wilson
- (Pakistan) Muhammad Rizwan Sr.
- (Pakistan) Muhammad Tousiq
- (South Korea) Nam Hyun-Woo
- (Spain) Roc Oliva

1 goal

- (Australia) Matthew Butturini
- (Australia) Christopher Ciriello
- (Australia) Mark Paterson
- (Germany) Benedikt Fürk
- (Germany) Christoph Menke
- (Germany) Christopher Wesley
- (Germany) Benjamin Weß
- (Germany) Martin Zwicker
- (United Kingdom) Ashley Jackson
- (United Kingdom) Glenn Kirkham
- (United Kingdom) Barry Middleton
- (Netherlands) Rogier Hofman
- (Netherlands) Teun de Nooijer
- (Netherlands) Valentin Verga
- (Netherlands) Mink van der Weerden
- (New Zealand) Simon Child
- (New Zealand) Dean Couzins
- (New Zealand) Hugo Inglis
- (New Zealand) Stephen Jenness
- (New Zealand) Shay Neal
- (Pakistan) Sohail Abbas
- (Pakistan) Shakeel Abbasi
- (Pakistan) Waseem Ahmed
- (Pakistan) Shafqat Rasool
- (South Korea) Jang Kyu-Yeob
- (South Korea) Lee Nam-Yong
- (South Korea) Cho Suk-Hoon
- (South Korea) Kim Young-Jin
- (Spain) David Alegre
- (Spain) Ramón Alegre
- (Spain) Juan Fernández La Villa

Source: FIH
