= 2018 Men's Hockey Düsseldorf Masters =

Tournament details
- Host country: Germany
- City: Düsseldorf
- Teams: 4
- Venue: Düsseldorfer HC

Final positions
- Champions: Germany (4th title)
- Runner-up: Argentina
- Third place: France

Tournament statistics
- Matches played: 6
- Goals scored: 28 (4.67 per match)
- Top scorer: (Germany) Timm Herzbruch (5 goals)

The 2018 Men's Hockey Düsseldorf Masters was the twenty-third edition of the Hamburg Masters, an international men's field hockey tournament, consisting of a series of test matches. It was held in Düsseldorf, Germany, from July 26 to 29, 2018, and featured four of the top nations in men's field hockey.

== Competition format ==
The tournament featured the national teams of Argentina, France, Ireland, and the hosts, Germany, competing in a round-robin format, with each team playing each other once. Three points were awarded for a win, one for a draw, and none for a loss.

| Country | July 2018 FIH Ranking | Best World Cup Finish | Best Olympic Games Finish |
|---|---|---|---|
| Argentina | 2 | Third Place (2014) | Champions (2016) |
| France | 18 | Seventh Place (1971, 1990) | Fourth Place (1920, 1936) |
| Germany | 5 | Champions (2006, 2010) | Champions (1992, 2008, 2012) |
| Ireland | 10 | Twelfth place (1978, 1990) | Runners-Up (1908) |

== Results ==
| Pos | Team | Pld | W | D | L | GF | GA | GD | Pts |
|---|---|---|---|---|---|---|---|---|---|
| 1 | Germany (H, C) | 3 | 2 | 1 | 0 | 13 | 4 | +9 | 7 |
| 2 | Argentina | 3 | 2 | 1 | 0 | 8 | 5 | +3 | 7 |
| 3 | France | 3 | 0 | 1 | 2 | 4 | 10 | −6 | 1 |
| 4 | Ireland | 3 | 0 | 1 | 2 | 3 | 9 | −6 | 1 |

Source: FIH
Rules for classification: 1) Points; 2) Goal difference; 3) Goals scored; 4) Games won; 5) Head-to-head.
(C) Champions; (H) Hosts

=== Matches ===
26 July 2018
17:00

| Ireland | 1–3 | Argentina |
|---|---|---|
| Bell 60' | Report | Ferreiro 23'; Peillat 30', 49' |

Umpires:
Johannes Berneth (GER)
Antoine Duhem (FRA)

26 July 2018
19:15

| Germany | 6–1 | France |
|---|---|---|
| Herzbruch 3', 34', 41'; Windfeder 36'; Wellen 46', 49' | Report | Masson 60+' |

Umpires:
Federico Silva (ARG)
Ian Diamond (SCO)

27 July 2018
17:00

| Argentina | 2–1 | France |
|---|---|---|
| Mazzilli 4'; Salis 41' | Report | Genestet 3' |

Umpires:
Johannes Berneth (GER)
Shane O'Donnell (IRE)

27 July 2018
19:15

| Germany | 4–0 | Ireland |
|---|---|---|
| M. Grambusch 36'; Herzbruch 42'; Wellen 51', 54' | Report |

Umpires:
Ian Diamond (SCO)
Antoine Duhem (FRA)

29 July 2018
09:30

| Ireland | 2–2 | France |
|---|---|---|
| Cole 8'; Loughrey 37' | Report | Coisne 25'; Masson 57' |

Umpires:
Federico Silva (ARG)
Johannes Berneth (GER)

29 July 2018
11:45

| Germany | 3–3 | Argentina |
|---|---|---|
| M. Grambusch 16'; Große 20'; Herzbruch 37' | Report | Ferreiro 14'; Barreiros 23'; Menini 32' |

Umpires:
Ian Diamond (SCO)
Shane O'Donnell (IRE)

== Statistics ==
=== Goalscorers ===
5 Goals

- (Germany) Timm Herzbruch

4 Goals

- (Germany) Niklas Wellen

2 Goals

- (Argentina) Martin Ferreiro
- (Argentina) Gonzalo Peillat
- (Germany) Mats Grambusch
- (France) Charles Masson

1 Goal

- (Argentina) Guido Barreiros
- (Argentina) Agustin Mazzilli
- (Argentina) Joaquín Menini
- (Argentina) Nahuel Salis
- (Germany) Johannes Große
- (Germany) Lukas Windfeder
- (France) Aristide Coisne
- (France) Hugo Genestet
- (Ireland) Matthew Bell
- (Ireland) Lee Cole
- (Ireland) Stuart Loughrey
