= 2004 Men's Hockey Hamburg Masters =

Tournament details
- Host country: Germany
- City: Hamburg
- Teams: 4
- Venue: Uhlenhorster HC

Final positions
- Champions: Germany (8th title)
- Runner-up: Pakistan
- Third place: Argentina

Tournament statistics
- Matches played: 6
- Goals scored: 36 (6 per match)
- Top scorer(s): (Pakistan) Muhammad Nadeem (South Korea) Lee Jeong-Seon (4 goals)

The 2004 Men's Hockey Hamburg Masters was the tenth edition of the Hamburg Masters, consisting of a series of test matches. It was held in Hamburg, Germany, from 18 to 20 June 2004, and featured four of the top nations in men's field hockey.

== Competition format ==
The tournament featured the national teams of Argentina, Pakistan, South Korea, and the hosts, Germany, competing in a round-robin format, with each team playing each other once. Three points were awarded for a win, one for a draw, and none for a loss.

Country	2004 FIH Ranking	Best World Cup Finish	Best Olympic Games Finish
Argentina	10	Sixth Place (1986, 2002)	Fifth Place (1948)
Germany	1	Champions (2002)	Champions (1992)
Pakistan	4	Champions (1971, 1978, 1982, 1994)	Champions (1960, 1968, 1984)
South Korea	7	Fourth Place (2002)	Runners-Up (2000)

== Officials ==
The following umpires were appointed by the International Hockey Federation to officiate the tournament:

- Iftikar Ahmed (PAK)
- Christian Bläsch (GER)
- Enzo Caravetta (ARG)
- Kim Kyung-Soo (KOR)
- Raymond O'Connor (IRE)

== Results ==
All times are local (Central European Summer Time).

=== Pool ===
Pos	Team	Pld	W	D	L	GF	GA	GD	Pts	Result
1	Germany (H)	3	2	0	1	8	7	+1	6	Tournament Champion
2	Pakistan	3	1	1	1	9	7	+2	4	
3	Argentina	3	1	1	1	11	13	−2	4	
4	South Korea	3	0	2	1	8	9	−1	2	

Source: Deutscher Hockey-Bund
Rules for classification: 1) Points; 2) Goal difference; 3) Goals scored; 4) Games won; 5) Head-to-head.
(H) Hosts

=== Fixtures ===
18 June 2004
16:30

Pakistan	1–1	South Korea
Abbas 39'	Report	Lee J. 67'

Umpires:
Christian Bläsch (GER)
Enzo Caravetta (ARG)

18 June 2004
18:45

Germany	2–3	Argentina
Bechmann 2'; Reinelt 6'	Report	Almada 8', 69'; R. Vila 39'

Umpires:
Raymond O'Connor (IRE)
Iftikar Ahmed (PAK)

19 June 2004
13:00

Pakistan	6–3	Argentina
Nadeem 16', 57', 59'; Ahmed 28'; Butt 34'; Abbas 50'	Report	Cammareri 11'; Lombi 47'; Retegui 63'

Umpires:
Kim Kyung-Soo (KOR)
Christian Bläsch (GER)

19 June 2004
15:30

South Korea	2–3	Germany
Lim 27'; Seo 66'	Report	Wein 15'; Kunz 56'; Bechmann 56'

Umpires:
Enzo Caravetta (ARG)
Raymond O'Connor (IRE)

20 June 2004
12:00

South Korea	5–5	Argentina
Lee J. 2', 26', 30'; Seo 44', 62'	Report	M. Vila 21', 40'; Ferrara 33', 38'; R. Vila 60'

Umpires:
Christian Bläsch (GER)
Iftikar Ahmed (PAK)

20 June 2004
14:30

Germany	3–2	Pakistan
Bechmann 30'; Emmerling 62'; Kunz 70'	Report	Nadeem 35'; Abbas 46'

Umpires:
Raymond O'Connor (IRE)
Kim Kyung-Soo (KOR)

== Statistics ==
=== Final standings ===
1. Germany
2. Pakistan
3. Argentina
4. South Korea

=== Goalscorers ===
There were 36 goals scored in 6 matches, for an average of 6 goals per match.

4 goals

- (Pakistan) Muhammad Nadeem
- (South Korea) Lee Jeong-Seon

3 goals

- (Germany) Christoph Bechmann
- (Pakistan) Sohail Abbas
- (South Korea) Seo Jong-Ho

2 goals

- (Argentina) Mario Almada
- (Argentina) Fernando Ferrara
- (Argentina) Matías Vila
- (Argentina) Rodrigo Vila
- (Germany) Florian Kunz

1 goal

- (Argentina) Lucas Cammareri
- (Argentina) Jorge Lombi
- (Argentina) Carlos Retegui
- (Germany) Björn Emmerling
- (Germany) Sascha Reinelt
- (Germany) Christian Wein
- (Pakistan) Waseem Ahmed
- (Pakistan) Rehan Butt
- (South Korea) Lim Jung-Woo
