= 2015 Men's EuroHockey Championship =

International field hockey tournament

Tournament details
- Host country: England
- City: London
- Dates: 21–29 August
- Teams: 8 (from 1 confederation)
- Venue: Lee Valley Hockey and Tennis Centre

Final positions
- Champions: Netherlands (4th title)
- Runner-up: Germany
- Third place: Ireland

Tournament statistics
- Matches played: 20
- Goals scored: 118 (5.9 per match)
- Top scorer: (Belgium) Tom Boon (10 goals)
- Best player: (Germany) Florian Fuchs

The 2015 Men's EuroHockey Championship was the 15th edition of the men's EuroHockey Nations Championship, the biennial international men's field hockey championship of Europe organised by the European Hockey Federation. It was held from 21 to 29 August 2015 in the Queen Elizabeth Olympic Park, London, England.

The Netherlands defeated the defending champions Germany 6–1 in the final to capture their fourth title, while Ireland won their first-ever medal by beating the hosts England 4–2. As the winners, the Netherlands qualified for the 2016 Summer Olympics in Rio de Janeiro, Brazil.

== Qualified teams ==
Dates	Event	Location	Quotas	Qualifier(s)
	Host		1	England
17–25 August 2013	2013 EuroHockey Championship	Boom, Belgium	5	Germany; Belgium; Netherlands; Spain; Ireland
3–11 August 2013	2013 EuroHockey Championship II	Vienna, Austria	2	Russia; France
Total			8	

== Format ==
The eight teams were split into two groups of four teams. The top two teams advanced to the semi-finals to determine the winner in a knockout system. The bottom two teams played in a new group with the teams they did not play against in the group stage. The last two teams were relegated to the EuroHockey Championship II.

== Results ==
=== Preliminary round ===
==== Pool A ====
Pos	Team	Pld	W	D	L	GF	GA	GD	Pts	Qualification
1	Netherlands	3	3	0	0	12	0	+12	9	Semi-finals
2	England (H)	3	2	0	1	14	3	+11	6	Semi-finals
3	Spain	3	1	0	2	9	6	+3	3	Pool C
4	Russia	3	0	0	3	1	27	−26	0	Pool C

Source: FIH
(H) Hosts

21 August 2015
17:15

Netherlands	2–0	Spain
Bakker 18'; Van der Weerden 24'	Report

Umpires:
Martin Madden (SCO)
Sebastien Duterme (BEL)

21 August 2015
19:30

England	10–1	Russia
Middleton 9'; Condon 11', 15', 25'; Griffiths 18'; Lewers 23'; Ward 34'; Gleghorne 34'; Catlin 41'; Ames 58'	Report	Plesetskii 30'

Umpires:
Ben Göntgen (GER)
Geoff Conn (IRL)

23 August 2015
08:30

Spain	9–0	Russia
Lleonart 2'; Quemada 15', 21', 29', 45', 55'; Casasayas 21', 30'; Dabanch 60'	Report

Umpires:
Jakub Mejzlík (CZE)
Sebastien Duterme (BEL)

23 August 2015
18:15

Netherlands	2–0	England
Pruijser 26'; Jonker 55'	Report

Umpires:
Marcin Grochal (POL)
Geoff Conn (IRL)

25 August 2015
17:15

Russia	0–8	Netherlands
	Report	Van der Weerden 1', 25'; Kemperman 7'; Hertzberger 22', 48', 57'; Jonker 52'; Bakker 60'

Umpires:
Marcelo Servetto (ESP)
Tim Benford (ENG)

25 August 2015
19:30

England	4–0	Spain
Jackson 20', 57'; Middleton 24'; Griffiths 45'	Report

Umpires:
Ben Göntgen (GER)
Coen van Bunge (NED)

==== Pool B ====
Pos	Team	Pld	W	D	L	GF	GA	GD	Pts	Qualification
1	Germany	3	3	0	0	13	2	+11	9	Semi-finals
2	Ireland	3	1	1	1	6	7	−1	4	Semi-finals
3	Belgium	3	1	1	1	6	9	−3	4	Pool C
4	France	3	0	0	3	8	15	−7	0	Pool C

Source: FIH

22 August 2015
08:30

Ireland	4–3	France
Good 1'; Caruth 36'; Bruton 45'; O'Donoghue 47'	Report	Kieffer 27'; Baumgarten 33'; Martin-Brisac 52'

Umpires:
Coen van Bunge (NED)
Tim Benford (ENG)

22 August 2015
16:00

Germany	4–0	Belgium
Wellen 42', 51'; Staib 48'; Fuchs 58'	Report

Umpires:
Marcin Grochal (POL)
Marcelo Servetto (ESP)

23 August 2015
16:00

France	3–4	Belgium
Charlet 6', 17'; Sanchez 38'	Report	Hendrickx 10'; Cobbaert 15'; Dockier 34'; Boon 50'

Umpires:
Hamish Jamson (ENG)
Martin Madden (SCO)

23 August 2015
20:30

Ireland	0–2	Germany
	Report	Windfeder 54'; Fuchs 56'

Umpires:
Marcelo Servetto (ESP)
Tim Benford (ENG)

25 August 2015
11:00

Germany	7–2	France
Fuchs 3', 43'; Wellen 24'; Fürste 30', 53'; Deecke 48'; Grambusch 50'	Report	Martin-Brisac 36', 56'

Umpires:
Hamish Jamson (ENG)
Sebastien Duterme (BEL)

25 August 2015
13:15

Belgium	2–2	Ireland
Dockier 34' van Aubel 40'	Report	Caruth 27'; Jackson 39'

Umpires:
Martin Madden (SCO)
Jakub Mejzlík (CZE)

=== Fifth to eighth place classification ===
==== Pool C ====
The points obtained in the preliminary round against the other team are taken over.

Pos	Team	Pld	W	D	L	GF	GA	GD	Pts	Relegation
5	Belgium	3	3	0	0	18	7	+11	9	
6	Spain	3	2	0	1	13	6	+7	6	
7	France (R)	3	1	0	2	10	10	0	3	EuroHockey Championship II
8	Russia (R)	3	0	0	3	6	24	−18	0	EuroHockey Championship II

Source: FIH
(R) Relegated

27 August 2015
11:00

Russia	2–4	France
Yankun 14'; Proskuriakov 58'	Report	Charlet 20', 33'; Masson 23'; Fourcroy 33'

Umpires:
Jakub Mejzlík (CZE)
Sebastien Duterme (BEL)

27 August 2015
17:15

Spain	0–3	Belgium
	Report	Boccard 47'; Boon 47', 55'

Umpires:
Geoff Conn (IRL)
Hamish Jamson (ENG)

29 August 2015
09:30

Belgium	11–4	Russia
Boon 2', 11', 17', 18', 34', 48', 58'; Hendrickx 25'; Stockbroekx 28'; Boccard 39'; Truyens 55'	Report	Siniagin 15'; Komarov 15'; Maiorov 20'; Yankun 51'

Umpires:
Tim Benford (ENG)
Geoff Conn (IRL)

29 August 2015
11:45

Spain	4–3	France
Dabanch 22'; Lleonart 28', 52'; Piera 57'	Report	Genestet 49'; Charlet 51', 54'

Umpires:
Marcin Grochal (POL)
Ben Göntgen (GER)

=== First to fourth place classification ===
Semi-finals
27 August
Netherlands	1
Ireland	0
27 August
England	2 (2)
Germany (p.s.o.)	2 (3)

Final
29 August
Netherlands	6
Germany	1
Third place
29 August
Ireland	4
England	2

==== Semi-finals ====
27 August 2015
13:15

Netherlands	1–0	Ireland
Hertzberger 12'	Report

Umpires:
Ben Göntgen (GER)
Marcelo Servetto (ESP)

27 August 2015
19:30

Germany	2–2	England
Zwicker 30'; Windfeder 57'	Report	Gleghorne 20'; Jackson 59'
Penalties
Fuchs (penalty shoot-out scored); Hauke (penalty shoot-out missed); Fürste (penalty shoot-out scored); Müller (penalty shoot-out missed); Grambusch (penalty shoot-out scored)	3–2	(penalty shoot-out scored) Jackson; (penalty shoot-out missed) Middleton; (penalty shoot-out missed) Catlin; (penalty shoot-out scored) Martin; (penalty shoot-out missed) Ward

Umpires:
Coen van Bunge (NED)
Marcin Grochal (POL)

==== Third and fourth place ====
29 August 2015
14:00

Ireland	4–2	England
O'Donoghue 13', 60'; Sothern 29'; Magee 39'	Report	Martin 11'; Dixon 23'

Umpires:
Jakub Mejzlík (CZE)
Marcelo Servetto (ESP)

==== Final ====
29 August 2015
16:30

Netherlands	6–1	Germany
Bakker 6'; Van der Weerden 14', 22'; Hertzberger 21'; Hofman 29'; Pruijser 47'	Report	Rühr 50'

Umpires:
Hamish Jamson (ENG)
Martin Madden (SCO)

== Statistics ==
=== Final standings ===
Rank	Team
Gold medal	Netherlands
Silver medal	Germany
Bronze medal	Ireland
4	England
5	Belgium
6	Spain
7	France
8	Russia

Qualified for the 2016 Summer Olympics

Relegated to the EuroHockey Championship II

=== Awards ===
Best Player of the Tournament	Best goalkeeper of the Tournament	Topscorer of the Tournament
(Germany) Florian Fuchs	(Ireland) David Harte	(Belgium) Tom Boon

=== Goalscorers ===
There were 118 goals scored in 20 matches, for an average of 5.9 goals per match.

10 goals

- (Belgium) Tom Boon

6 goals

- (France) Victor Charlet

5 goals

- (Netherlands) Jeroen Hertzberger
- (Netherlands) Mink van der Weerden
- (Spain) Pau Quemada

4 goals

- (Germany) Florian Fuchs

3 goals

- (England) David Condon
- (England) Ashley Jackson
- (France) Simon Martin-Brisac
- (Germany) Niklas Wellen
- (Ireland) Shane O'Donoghue
- (Netherlands) Billy Bakker
- (Spain) Xavi Lleonart

2 goals

- (Belgium) Gauthier Boccard
- (Belgium) Sébastien Dockier
- (Belgium) Alexander Hendrickx
- (England) Mark Gleghorne
- (England) Chris Griffiths
- (England) Barry Middleton
- (Germany) Moritz Fürste
- (Germany) Lukas Windfeder
- (Ireland) Peter Caruth
- (Netherlands) Constantijn Jonker
- (Netherlands) Mirco Pruijser
- (Russia) Nikolay Yankun
- (Spain) Álex Casasayas
- (Spain) Gabriel Dabanch

1 goal

- (Belgium) Florent van Aubel
- (Belgium) Mathew Cobbaert
- (Belgium) Emmanuel Stockbroekx
- (Belgium) Jérôme Truyens
- (England) David Ames
- (England) Nick Catlin
- (England) Adam Dixon
- (England) Iain Lewers
- (England) Harry Martin
- (England) Sam Ward
- (France) Gaspard Baumgarten
- (France) Alexis Fourcroy
- (France) Martin Genestet
- (France) Jean-Laurent Kieffer
- (France) Charles Masson
- (France) Olivier Sanchez
- (Germany) Oskar Deecke
- (Germany) Mats Grambusch
- (Germany) Christopher Rühr
- (Germany) Constantin Staib
- (Germany) Martin Zwicker
- (Ireland) Jonathan Bruton
- (Ireland) Kyle Good
- (Ireland) John Jackson
- (Ireland) Eugene Magee
- (Ireland) Alan Sothern
- (Netherlands) Rogier Hofman
- (Netherlands) Robbert Kemperman
- (Russia) Nikolay Komarov
- (Russia) Aleksei Maiorov
- (Russia) Pavel Plesetskii
- (Russia) Mikhail Proskuriakov
- (Russia) Igor Siniagin
- (Spain) Salvador Piera

Source: FIH

== See also ==
- 2015 Women's EuroHockey Nations Championship
