= 2003 Men's Hockey Hamburg Masters =

Tournament details
- Host country: Germany
- City: Hamburg
- Teams: 4
- Venue(s): Uhlenhorster HC

Final positions
- Champions: India (1st title)
- Runner-up: Germany
- Third place: Spain

Tournament statistics
- Matches played: 6
- Goals scored: 31 (5.17 per match)

The 2003 Men's Hockey Hamburg Masters was the ninth edition of the Hamburg Masters, consisting of a series of test matches. It was held in Hamburg, Germany, from 27 to 29 June 2003, and featured four of the top nations in men's field hockey.

== Competition format ==
The tournament featured the national teams of Argentina, India, Spain, and the hosts, Germany, competing in a round-robin format, with each team playing each other once. Three points were awarded for a win, one for a draw, and none for a loss.

Country	2003 FIH Ranking	Best World Cup Finish	Best Olympic Games Finish
Argentina	7	Sixth Place (1986, 2002)	Fifth Place (1948)
Germany	1	Champions (2002)	Champions (1992)
India	6	Champions (1975)	Champions (1928, 1932, 1936, 1948, 1952, 1956, 1964, 1980)
Spain	9	Runners-Up (1971, 1998)	Runners-Up (1980, 1996)

== Officials ==
The following umpires were appointed by the International Hockey Federation to officiate the tournament:

- Björn Bachmann (GER)
- Henrik Ehlers (AUT)
- Daniel Santí (ARG)
- Guillermo Sánchez (ESP)
- Javeed Sheikh (IND)

== Results ==
All times are local (Central European Summer Time).

=== Pool ===
Pos	Team	Pld	W	D	L	GF	GA	GD	Pts	Result
1	India	3	2	0	1	10	6	+4	6	Tournament Champion
2	Germany (H)	3	1	2	0	9	8	+1	5	
3	Spain	3	1	1	1	6	7	−1	4	
4	Argentina	3	0	1	2	6	10	−4	1	

Source: Deutscher Hockey-Bund
Rules for classification: 1) Points; 2) Goal difference; 3) Goals scored; 4) Games won; 5) Head-to-head.
(H) Hosts

=== Fixtures ===
27 June 2003
16:30

Argentina	1–4	India
Retegui 52'	Report	D. Tirkey 6'; Jugraj 26'; Baljit 42'; Gagan Ajit 60'

Umpires:
Björn Bachmann (GER)
Guillermo Sánchez (ESP)

27 June 2003
18:45

Germany	2–2	Spain
Reinelt 43'; Weißenborn 44'	Report	Ribas 14'; Escarré 30'

Umpires:
Henrik Ehlers (AUT)
Daniel Santí (ARG)

28 June 2003
14:30

Argentina	1–2	Spain
Retegui 64'	Report	Escarré 41', 44'

Umpires:
Björn Bachmann (GER)
Javeed Sheikh (IND)

28 June 2003
17:00

India	2–3	Germany
D. Tirkey 33'; Gagan Ajit 47'	Report	Kunz 36'; Wein 41'; Emmerling 63'

Umpires:
Guillermo Sánchez (ESP)
Henrik Ehlers (AUT)

29 June 2003
12:00

India	4–2	Spain
Kanwalpreet 3'; Gagan Ajit 18'; Deepak 24'; D. Tirkey 59'	Report	Aguilar 34'; Escarré 56'

Umpires:
Daniel Santí (ARG)
Björn Bachmann (GER)

29 June 2003
14:30

Germany	4–4	Argentina
Eimer 4'; Witthaus 15'; Emmerling 27'; Michel 63'	Report	M. Vila 12', 39'; Almada 29'; Retegui 64'

Umpires:
Henrik Ehlers (AUT)
Javeed Sheikh (IND)

== Statistics ==
=== Final standings ===
1. India
2. Germany
3. Spain
4. Argentina

=== Goalscorers ===
There were 31 goals scored in 6 matches, for an average of 5.17 goals per match.

4 goals

- (Spain) Juan Escarré

3 goals

- (Argentina) Carlos Retegui
- (India) Gagan Ajit Singh
- (India) Dilip Tirkey

2 goals

- (Argentina) Matías Vila
- (Germany) Björn Emmerling

1 goal

- (Argentina) Mario Almada
- (Germany) Christoph Eimer
- (Germany) Florian Kunz
- (Germany) Björn Michel
- (Germany) Sascha Reinelt
- (Germany) Christian Wein
- (Germany) Tibor Weißenborn
- (Germany) Matthias Witthaus
- (India) Baljit Singh Dhillon
- (India) Jugraj Singh
- (India) Kanwalpreet Singh
- (India) Deepak Thakur
- (Spain) Eduardo Aguilar
- (Spain) Xavier Ribas
