= Jenniskens =

Jenniskens is a Dutch surname. Notable people with the surname include:

- Peter Jenniskens (born 1962), Dutch astronomer
- Tim Jenniskens (born 1986), Dutch field hockey player

== See also ==
- 42981 Jenniskens, main-belt asteroid
