= Hamburg Masters (field hockey) =

- Most recent season or competition: 2018 Men's Hockey Düsseldorf Masters
- Sport: Field hockey
- Founded: 1989
- Folded: 2018
- No. of teams: 4
- Continent: FIH (International)
- Last champion: Germany
- Most titles: Germany (16 titles)

The Hamburg Masters was an international field hockey tournament held by the German Hockey Federation.

== History ==
The Hamburg Masters was introduced to international hockey in 1989.

Following its introduction, the Hamburg Masters began being played on an annual basis in 1996. The tournament was only omitted on two occasions, in 1999 and 2011. In 2012, the decision was made to move the tournament to different venues on a bi-annual basis, continuing play in Hamburg in uneven years, while moving to Düsseldorf in even years.

== Results ==
=== Summaries ===
==== 1989–1998 ====
Year	Host	Winner	Runner-up	Third place	Fourth place
1989	Hamburg	West Germany	Australia	Soviet Union	Argentina
1993	Hamburg	Australia	Pakistan	Netherlands	Germany
1996	Hamburg	Germany	Spain	Australia	India
1997	Hamburg	Germany	Netherlands	Australia	India
1998	Hamburg	Germany	Netherlands	South Korea	India

==== 2000–2009 ====
Year	Host	Winner	Runner-up	Third place	Fourth place
2000	Hamburg	Germany	South Korea	Great Britain	Netherlands
2001	Hamburg	Germany	Pakistan	Netherlands	South Korea
2002	Hamburg	Germany	Argentina	Malaysia	Spain
2003	Hamburg	India	Germany	Spain	Argentina
2004	Hamburg	Germany	Pakistan	Argentina	South Korea
2005	Hamburg	Netherlands	Australia	Germany	Pakistan
2006	Hamburg	Netherlands	Spain	Pakistan	Germany
2007	Hamburg	Germany	Spain	Belgium	England
2008	Hamburg	Germany	Malaysia	Pakistan	Belgium
2009	Hamburg	Australia	Germany	Netherlands	England

==== 2010–2018 ====
Year	Host	Winner	Runner-up	Third place	Fourth place
2010	Hamburg	Germany	Japan	Netherlands	India
2012	Düsseldorf	Germany	Belgium	Netherlands	Spain
2013	Hamburg	Germany	Netherlands	England	Ireland
2014	Düsseldorf	Belgium	Netherlands	Germany	England
2015	Hamburg	Germany	Belgium	England	Spain
2016	Düsseldorf	Germany	Great Britain	Netherlands	Belgium
2017	Hamburg	Ireland	Germany	Spain	Austria
2018	Düsseldorf	Germany	Argentina	France	Ireland

=== Team appearances ===
Team	1989	1993	1996	1997	1998	2000	2001	2002	2003	2004	2005	2006	2007	2008	2009	2010	2012	2013	2014	2015	2016	2017	2018	Total
Argentina	4th	–	–	–	–	–	–	2nd	4th	3rd	–	–	–	–	–	–	–	–	–	–	–	–	2nd	5
Australia	2nd	1st	3rd	3rd	–	–	–	–	–	–	2nd	–	–	–	1st	–	–	–	–	–	–	–	–	6
Austria	–	–	–	–	–	–	–	–	–	–	–	–	–	–	–	–	–	–	–	–	–	4th	–	1
Belgium	–	–	–	–	–	–	–	–	–	–	–	–	3rd	4th	–	–	2nd	–	1st	2nd	4th	–	–	6
England **	–	–	–	–	–	3rd	–	–	–	–	–	–	4th	–	4th	–	–	3rd	4th	3rd	2nd	–	–	7
France	–	–	–	–	–	–	–	–	–	–	–	–	–	–	–	–	–	–	–	–	–	–	3rd	1
Germany *	1st	4th	1st	1st	1st	1st	1st	1st	2nd	1st	3rd	4th	1st	1st	2nd	1st	1st	1st	3rd	1st	1st	2nd	1st	23
India	–	–	4th	4th	4th	–	–	–	1st	–	–	–	–	–	–	4th	–	–	–	–	–	–	–	5
Ireland	–	–	–	–	–	–	–	–	–	–	–	–	–	–	–	–	–	4th	–	–	–	1st	4th	3
Japan	–	–	–	–	–	–	–	–	–	–	–	–	–	–	–	2nd	–	–	–	–	–	–	–	1
Malaysia	–	–	–	–	–	–	–	3rd	–	–	–	–	–	2nd	–	–	–	–	–	–	–	–	–	2
Netherlands	–	3rd	–	2nd	2nd	4th	3rd	–	–	–	1st	1st	–	–	3rd	3rd	3rd	2nd	2nd	–	3rd	–	–	13
Pakistan	–	2nd	–	–	–	–	2nd	–	–	2nd	4th	3rd	–	3rd	–	–	–	–	–	–	–	–	–	6
South Korea	–	–	–	–	3rd	2nd	4th	–	–	4th	–	–	–	–	–	–	–	–	–	–	–	–	–	4
Soviet Union	3rd	defunct																						1
Spain	5th	–	2nd	–	–	–	–	4th	3rd	–	–	2nd	2nd	–	–	–	4th	–	–	4th	–	3rd	–	9
Total	5	4	4	4	4	4	4	4	4	4	4	4	4	4	4	4	4	4	4	4	4	4	4	93
