= Filip Neusser =

Czech field hockey player

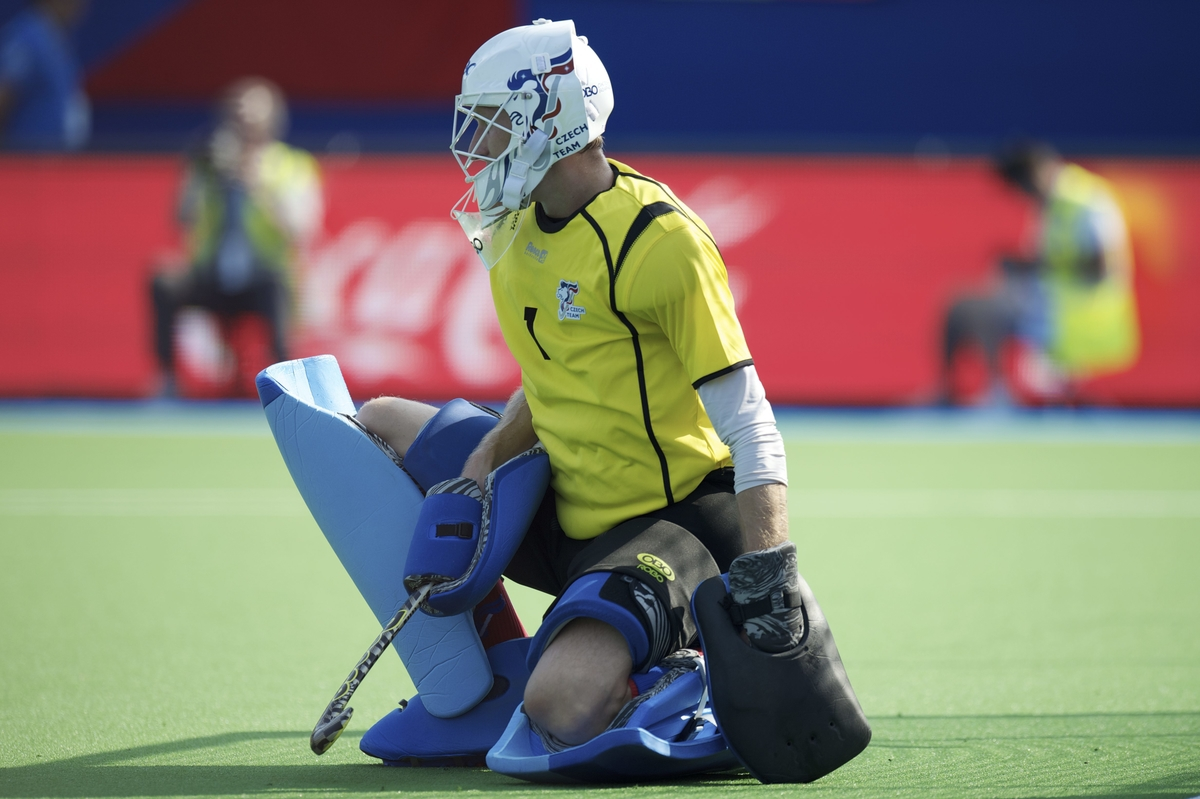
- Born: 16 September 1981 (age 44) Prague, CZE
- Height: 6 ft 5 in (196 cm)
- Weight: 202 lb (92 kg; 14 st 6 lb)
- Position: Goaltender
- Played for: East Grinstead Hockey Club; Münchner SC; Tabuiente Las Palmas; Mannheimer HC; HC BRA; Gladbacher HTC; HC Teddington
- National team: Czech Republic
- Playing career: 2003–-

Filip Neusser (born 16 September 1981 in Prague, Czech Republic) is a former Czech professional field hockey goalkeeper.

== Playing career, awards and honors ==
Neusser started playing hockey in Prague at the age of six. At 16 he was named the best goalkeeper during the U21 indoor European Championships in 1998.

Neusser, who has more than 150 caps, has represented the Czech Republic since 1997 and started his professional career in 2003 in Germany. Playing for the Czech National team, he was voted the best goalkeeper of the tournament during the World Cup qualification and 3 times during the European championships division B. In 2013 he had the chance to show his skills in Boom (Belgium) during the European Championships where he was also named the best goalkeeper of the tournament.

He played for East Grinstead Hockey Club in England. Neusser is a double indoor Champion of England hockey league. He was also voted Man of the Match during the Wembley Final in 2014.
Neusser is considered one of the best goalkeepers in the world in general and the best goalkeeper in the world in indoor field hockey.

== Regular season clubs ==
Season	Team	League
2012–14	East Grinstead Hockey Club	ENG
2010–12	Münchner SC	GER
2010	Tabuiente Las Palmas	ESP
2008–09	Mannheimer HC	GER
2007-08	HC BRA	ITA
2006–07	Gladbacher HTC	GER
2005–06	HC Teddington	ENG

== Personal life ==
Neusser lives in Prague and he has two daughters.
