= Darren Cheesman =

English field hockey player

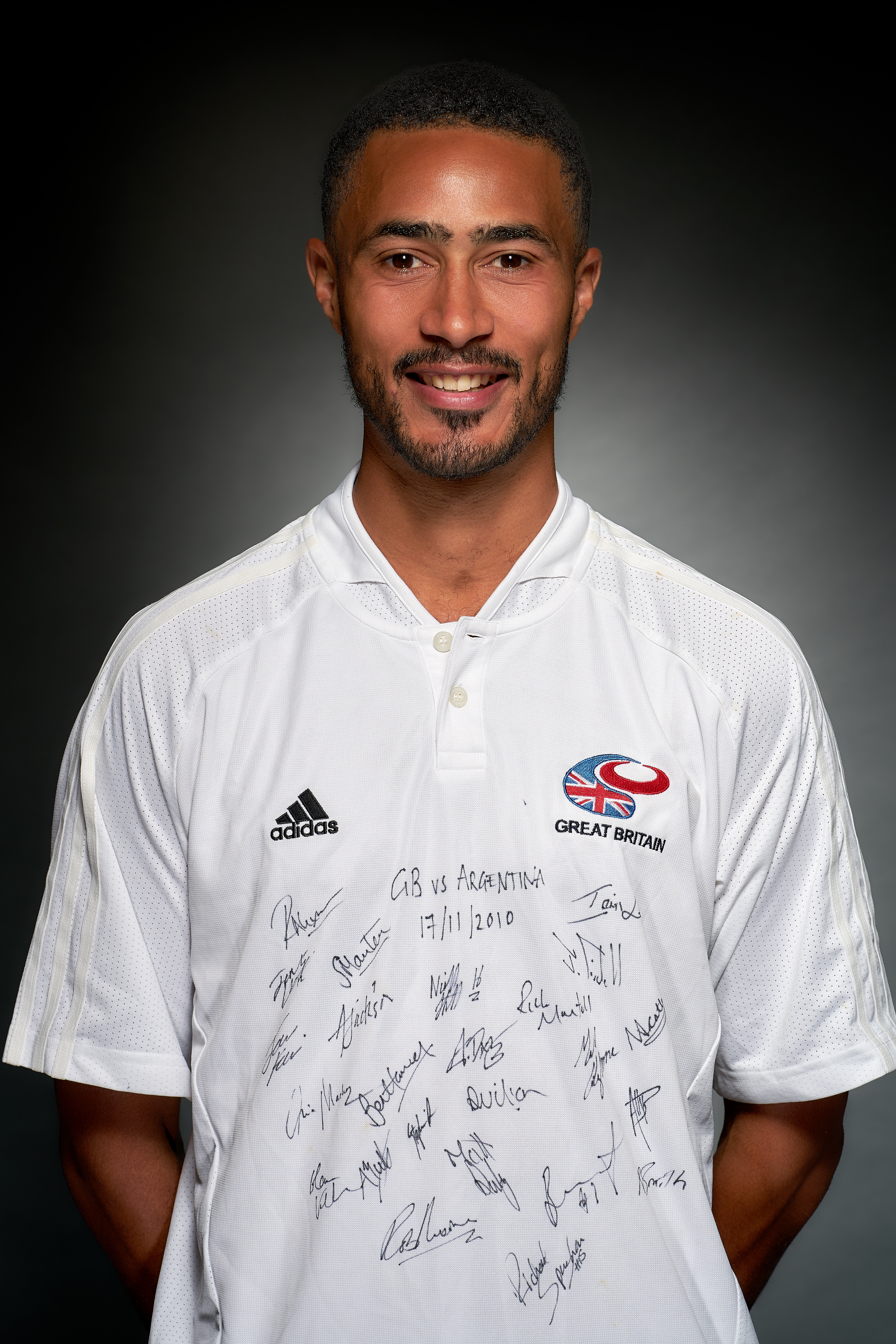
- Darren Cheesman in September 2018

Personal information
- Born: 23 February 1986 (age 40) Hackney, London, England

Sport
- Sport: Field hockey
- Position: Midfielder/forward
Senior career
Years	Team	Caps	Goals
2005–2006	Oranje Zwart	-	-
2006–2012	East Grinstead	-	-
2012–2014	Reading	-	-
2014–2017	Southgate	-	-
National team
Years	Team	Caps	Goals
–	England & GB		-

Darren Cheesman (born 23 February 1986) is a former England and Great Britain field hockey International, who is now the Head Coach of Berliner HC in the German Bundesliga as well as the Assistant Coach for the German U21 Men National Team. He is also a Coach Educator for FIH.

== Biography ==
Cheesman was born Hackney, London. Cheesman came into hockey through Arsenal FC's 'Sport in the Community' programme. It is a programme that sees the football club send coaches into local schools and communities to teach them various sports. Cheesman attended Arsenal's 'in the community' scheme and gained opportunities and life skills.

After playing in the 2005 Junior World Cup, Cheesman was signed by Oranje Zwart, a Premier League club in Netherlands. He spent a year there playing with and against the best players in the world. In 2007, he was a member of the Great Britain U21 team that won silver medal at the 2007 Junior Olympic Games in Sydney, Australia.

After leaving Oranje Zwart, he played club hockey for East Grinstead in the Men's England Hockey League. During his first spell at East Grinstead, Cheesman was voted 'Premier League Player of the Year'. Cheesman played an instrumental role in East Grinstead's successes both domestically and in the Euro Hockey League. In 2010 he scored on his debut for England against Argentina. He joined Reading for the start of the 2012/13 season and represented England during the 2012 Men's Hockey Champions Trophy.

He would also play for Southgate and Old Loughtonians, Klein Zwitserland, and Laren in the Dutch League, Wellington and Daring in the Belgian league.

After his playing career, Cheesman moved into coaching, completing his level 3 coaching award with England Hockey before gaining qualifications with FIH (high performance coach, coach educator, and trainer). Also academically with University of Central Lancashire (PG Diploma, Masters, and currently completing Doctorate, all in Elite Coaching Practice).

He is now the Head Coach of Berliner HC men in the German Bundesliga as well as the Assistant Coach of Germany U21 Men, having previously been the coach of Laren Women in the Dutch league, Waterloo Ducks Women and Wellington Women in the Belgian league, alongside positions with England Junior National Team and Belgium Junior National Team.
