= Marc Salles =

Spanish field hockey player

Marc Sallés
Personal information
- Full name: Marc Sallés Esteve
- Born: 6 May 1987 (age 39) Terrassa, Spain
- Height: 1.70 m (5 ft 7 in)
- Weight: 64 kg (141 lb)

Sport
- Sport: Field hockey
- Position: Midfielder
- Club: Atlètic Terrassa
Youth career
- Team
- –: CD Terrassa
- 1998–: Atlètic Terrassa
Senior career
Years	Team	Caps	Goals
–2009	Atlètic Terrassa	-	-
2009–2011	Oranje Zwart	-	-
2011–2018	Atlètic Terrassa	-	-
2018–2019	Club de Campo	-	-
2019–2024	Atlètic Terrassa	-	-
National team
Years	Team	Caps	Goals
2007–2021	Spain	258	(18)
Medal record
Men's field hockey
Representing Spain
EuroHockey Championship
Silver medal – second place	2019 Antwerp
Champions Trophy
Silver medal – second place	2011 Auckland

Marc Sallés Esteve (born 6 May 1987) is a Spanish former field hockey player who played as a midfielder for the Spanish national team.

At the 2012 Summer Olympics, he competed for the national team in the men's tournament.

== Personal life ==
As of 2012, Salles studies Business Administration Salles is 141 pounds (64 kilograms) in weight, 170 centimetres (5 feet 7 inches) tall and is right-handed.

== Career ==
Salles is coached by national coach Daniel Martin. He played for Atletic de Terrassa, in Terrassa, Catalonia until 2009 and from 2011 until 2018. After playing one season for Club de Campo, he returned to Atlètic Terrassa for the 2019–20 season.

Marc Sallés winning goal against France in August 2011 at the 2011 EuroHockey Championship secured A division status for Spain in 2013. At the 2012 Summer Olympics in London, he competed in the field hockey men's tournament but did not score. In August 2019, he was selected in the Spain squad for the 2019 EuroHockey Championship. They won the silver medal as they lost 5–0 to Belgium in the final. On 25 May 2021, he was selected in the squad for the 2021 EuroHockey Championship. He retired after the 2023–24 season.
