= Nigel Iggo =

New Zealand field hockey umpire

Nigel Iggo is an international field hockey umpire, from Canterbury, New Zealand. He is on the International Hockey Federation (FIH) World Development Panel, for upgrading to the World Panel.

== Umpiring achievements ==
Iggo was named New Zealand's 2006 Male Umpire of the Year, and the 2006 NHL (National Hockey League) Most Valuable Umpire. Iggo was appointed to the 2006 Men's Hockey World Cup Qualifier, held in Changzhou, China. Iggo also attended the 2005 Junior World Cup, held in Rotterdam and was an umpire at the 2010 Champions Trophy tournament, held in Germany. He umpired the third place playoff game.
