= Álex Casasayas =

Spanish field hockey player (born 1988)

Personal information
- Full name: Álex Casasayas Carles
- Born: 2 February 1988 (age 38) Barcelona, Spain

Sport
- Sport: Field hockey
- Club: Braxgata
Senior career
Years	Team	Caps	Goals
–2019	Real Club de Polo	-	-
2019–	Braxgata	-	-
National team
Years	Team	Caps	Goals
–	Spain	100	-
Medal record
Men's field hockey
Representing Spain
Champions Trophy
Silver medal – second place	2011 Auckland

Álex Casasayas Carles (born 2 February 1988) is a Spanish field hockey player who plays for Belgian club Braxgata.

At the 2016 Summer Olympics, he competed for the national team in the men's tournament.

Casasayas played for Real Club de Polo in Spain until the 2018–19 season when he moved to Belgium to play for Braxgata.
