= Christian Wein =

German field hockey player

Personal information
- Nationality: German
- Born: 6 June 1979 (age 46) Barcelona, Spain

Sport
- Sport: Field hockey

Christian Wein (born 6 June 1979) is a German field hockey player. He competed in the men's tournament at the 2000 Summer Olympics.
