= Constantijn Jonker =

Dutch field hockey player

Personal information
- Full name: Constantijn Remme Benjamin Jonker
- Born: 20 September 1987 (age 38) Utrecht, Netherlands

Sport
- Sport: Field hockey
- Position: Forward
National team
Years	Team	Caps	Goals
2006–2016	Netherlands	92	(39)
Medal record
Men's field hockey
Representing Netherlands
FIH World Cup
Silver medal – second place	2014 The Hague	Team
EuroHockey Championships
Gold medal – first place	2015 London	Team
Bronze medal – third place	2013 Boom	Team
Bronze medal – third place	2009 Amsterdam	Team
FIH World League
Gold medal – first place	2012–13 New Delhi	Team

Constantijn Jonker (born 20 September 1987) is a former field hockey player from the Netherlands, who played as a forward.

== Personal life ==
Constantijn Jonker was born and raised in Utrecht, Netherlands.

== Career ==
=== Club hockey ===
At a domestic level, Jonker plays for his home club, SV Kampong in the Dutch Hoofdklasse.

=== International hockey ===
Constantijn Jonker made his debut for the Netherlands in 2006, at just nineteen years of age.

Following his debut, Jonker's appearances in the national team were quite sporadic, until he became a mainstay in the squad from 2013.

Jonker medalled with the national team on five occasions throughout his career. He won three medals at the EuroHockey Championships, gold in 2015, as well as bronze in 2009 and 2013. He also won silver at the 2014 FIH World Cup as well as gold at the 2012–13 FIH World League.

Jonker retired from international hockey in 2016 after he failed to make the Rio Olympic team.
