= Klaas Vermeulen =

Dutch field hockey player

Medal record

Men's field hockey

Representing Netherlands

Olympic Games
Silver medal – second place	2012 London	Team

Champions Trophy
Silver medal – second place	2012 Melbourne	Team

Klaas Vermeulen (born 4 March 1988, in Utrecht) is a Dutch field hockey player. At the 2012 Summer Olympics, he competed for the national team in the men's tournament, winning a silver medal.
