= Marcel Balkestein =

Dutch field hockey player (born 1981)

Medal record

Men's field hockey

Representing Netherlands

Olympic Games
Silver medal – second place	2012 London	Team

World Cup
Silver medal – second place	2014 The Hague	Team

Champions Trophy
Silver medal – second place	2012 Melbourne	Team

Marcel Balkestein (Dutch pronunciation: [mɑrˈsɛl ˈbɑlkəstɛin]; born 29 January 1981 in Geldrop) is a Dutch field hockey player. At the 2012 Summer Olympics, he competed for the national team in the men's tournament, and was part of the Dutch team that won the silver medal.

Balkestein married the Dutch volleyball player Maret Balkestein-Grothues on 5 July 2014.
