= Martin Zwicker =

German field hockey player

Personal information
- Full name: Martin Detlef Zwicker
- Born: 27 February 1987 (age 39) Köthen, East Germany
- Height: 1.75 m (5 ft 9 in)
- Weight: 64 kg (141 lb)

Sport
- Sport: Field hockey
- Position: Midfielder / Forward
- Club: Berliner HC
Youth career
- Team
- –: Cöthener HC
Senior career
Years	Team	Caps	Goals
–	Berliner HC	-	-
National team
Years	Team	Caps	Goals
2008–present	Germany	247	(24)
Medal record
Representing Germany
Men's field hockey
Olympic Games
Silver medal – second place	2024 Paris	Team
Bronze medal – third place	2016 Rio de Janeiro	Team
World Cup
Gold medal – first place	2023 Bhubaneswar/Rourkela
Silver medal – second place	2010 New Delhi
EuroHockey Championship
Gold medal – first place	2013 Boom
Silver medal – second place	2009 Amstelveen
Silver medal – second place	2015 London
Silver medal – second place	2021 Amstelveen
Champions Trophy
Gold medal – first place	2014 Bhubaneswar
Bronze medal – third place	2016 London
Men's indoor hockey
Indoor World Cup
Silver medal – second place	2018 Berlin
- Updated on 24 July 2021

Martin Detlef Zwicker (born 27 February 1987) is a German field hockey player who plays as a midfielder or forward for Berliner HC and the German national team.

== International career ==
Zwicker represented his country at the 2016 Summer Olympics, where he won the bronze medal. He also played in the 2010 and 2014 World Cup. On 28 May 2021, he was named in the squads for the 2021 EuroHockey Championship and the 2020 Summer Olympics.
