= Simon Mantell =

British field hockey player (born 1984)

Personal information
- Born: 24 April 1984 (age 42) Bridgwater, Somerset, England
- Height: 1.84 m (6 ft 0 in)
- Weight: 81 kg (179 lb)

Sport
- Sport: Field hockey
- Position: Forward
Senior career
| Years | Team | Caps | Goals |
| –2004 | Firebrands | - | - |
| 2004–2008 | Reading | - | - |
| 2008–2009 | HGC | - | - |
| 2009–2016 | Reading | - | - |
| 2016–2018 | Wimbledon | - | - |
National team
| Years | Team | Caps | Goals |
| 2005–2016 | England & Great Britain | 212 | (62) |
Medal record
Men's field hockey
Representing England
Champions Trophy
| Silver medal – second place | 2010 Mönchengladbach | Team |
European Championship
| Gold medal – first place | 2009 Amsterdam | Team |
Commonwealth Games
| Bronze medal – third place | 2014 Glasgow | Team |
World League
| Bronze medal – third place | 2014 New Delhi | Team |

Simon Douglas Mantell (born 24 April 1984) is an English field hockey forward. He is the younger brother of Richard Mantell. He competed at the 2008 Summer Olympics and 2016 Summer Olympics.

== Biography ==
Mantell was born in Bridgwater, Somerset and educated at Millfield School in Street and studied at the University of Birmingham.

Mantell played club hockey for Firebrands in Bristol before switching to Reading in the Men's England Hockey League. He made his international senior debut for the national squad on 9 November 2005 against Ireland at Beeston. He was a member of the England squad that finished fifth at the 2006 Men's Hockey World Cup.

He competed for England at the 2006 Commonwealth Games and also represented Great Britain and was part of the side that returned victorious from the Olympic qualifying event in Chile, as well as competing at the 2008 Summer Olympics in Beijing.

After the Olympics, Mantell had one season playing in the Netherlands for HGC before returning to Reading at the start of the 2009/10 season. He was part of the winning squad at the 2009 EuroHockey Championship, represented England in the 2010 Commonwealth Games in Delhi and was part of the silver medal winning England team that competed at the 2010 Men's Hockey Champions Trophy in Mönchengladbach, Germany. He also competed at the 2011 Champions Trophy.

Still at Reading, Mantell represented England in the 2014 Commonwealth Games in Glasgow, where he won a bronze medal.

In 2016, Mantell joined Wimbledon and at the end of 2016, Mantell announced his international retirement.
