= Linus Butt =

German field hockey player

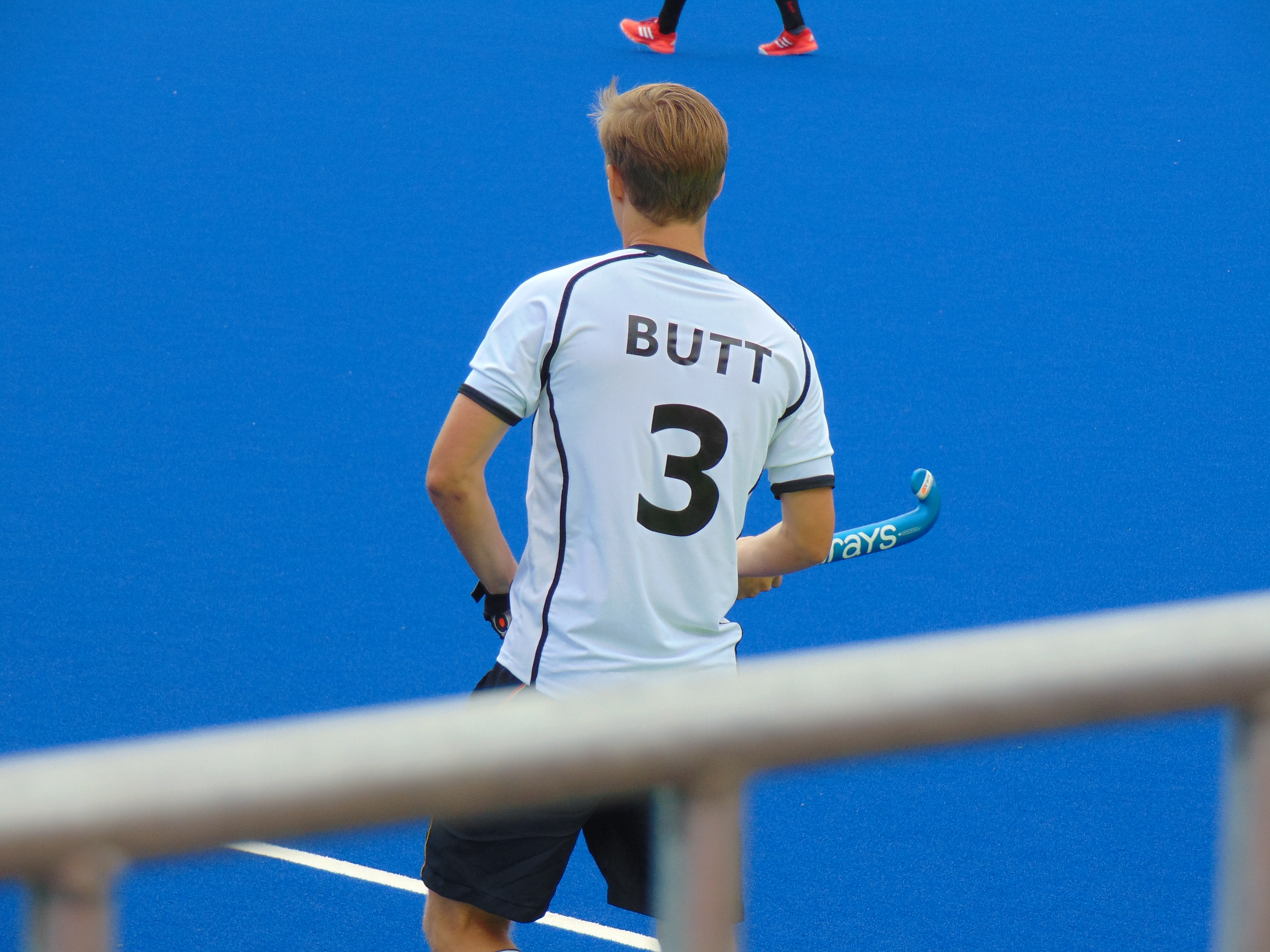

Personal information
- Born: 12 March 1987 (age 39) Kempen, West Germany
- Height: 1.86 m (6 ft 1 in)
- Weight: 83 kg (183 lb)

Sport
- Sport: Field hockey
Medal record
Men's field hockey
Representing Germany
Olympic Games
Bronze medal – third place	2016 Rio de Janeiro	Team

Linus Butt (born 12 March 1987) is a former German field hockey player. He represented his country at the 2016 Summer Olympics, where he won the bronze medal.
