= Emmanuel Stockbroekx =

Belgian field hockey player (born 1993)

Manu Stockbroekx
Personal information
- Born: 23 December 1993 (age 32) Brasschaat, Belgium
- Height: 1.89 m (6 ft 2 in)
- Weight: 88 kg (194 lb)

Sport
- Sport: Field hockey
- Position: Defender
- Club: Orée
Senior career
Years	Team	Caps	Goals
–2016	Dragons	-	-
2016–2019	Bloemendaal	-	-
2019–2020	Dragons	-	-
2020–present	Orée	-	-
National team
Years	Team	Caps	Goals
2013	Belgium U21	30	-
2013–present	Belgium	157	-
Medal record
Men's field hockey
Representing Belgium
Olympic Games
Silver medal – second place	2016 Rio de Janeiro	Team
World Cup
Gold medal – first place	2018 Bhubaneswar
EuroHockey Championship
Gold medal – first place	2019 Antwerp
Silver medal – second place	2013 Boom
Silver medal – second place	2017 Amstelveen
Bronze medal – third place	2023 Mönchengladbach
Hockey World League
Silver medal – second place	2014–15 Raipur	Team

Emmanuel Stockbroekx (born 23 December 1993) is a Belgian field hockey player who plays for Orée and the Belgian national team as a defender.

== Club career ==
Stockbroekx played in Belgium for Dragons until 2016, when he moved to the Netherlands to play for Bloemendaal. In April 2019, he announced he would return to Dragons after a three-year stint at Bloemendaal. In his final season with Bloemendaal, he won the Dutch national title by defeating Kampong in the championship final. In June 2020, it was announced he joined Royal Orée for the 2020–21 season.

== International career ==
With Belgium, Stockbroekx became European vice-champion at the 2013 European Championship on home ground in Boom. Three years later, he appeared at the 2016 Summer Olympics field hockey tournament. During the Olympic tournament's group phase, he scored a goal against Spain. In November 2018, he was selected for the Belgium squad for the 2018 World Cup. After the second match, he had to withdraw because of a hamstring injury. In August 2019, he was selected in the Belgium squad for the 2019 EuroHockey Championship. They won Belgium its first European title by defeating Spain 5–0 in the final.
