= Jan-Marco Montag =

German field hockey player

Medal record

Representing Germany

Men's field hockey

Olympic Games
Gold medal – first place	2008 Beijing	Team

World Cup
Gold medal – first place	2006 Mönchengladbach	Team

Champions Trophy
Gold medal – first place	2007 Kuala Lumpur	Team

EuroHockey
Gold medal – first place	2011 Gladbach	Team
Bronze medal – third place	2005 Leipzig	Team

Jan-Marco Montag (born 12 August 1983 in Cologne) is a German field hockey player. He was a member of the Men's National Teams that won the gold medal at the 2008 Summer Olympics and at the 2006 World Cup.
