= Christopher Zeller =

German field hockey player

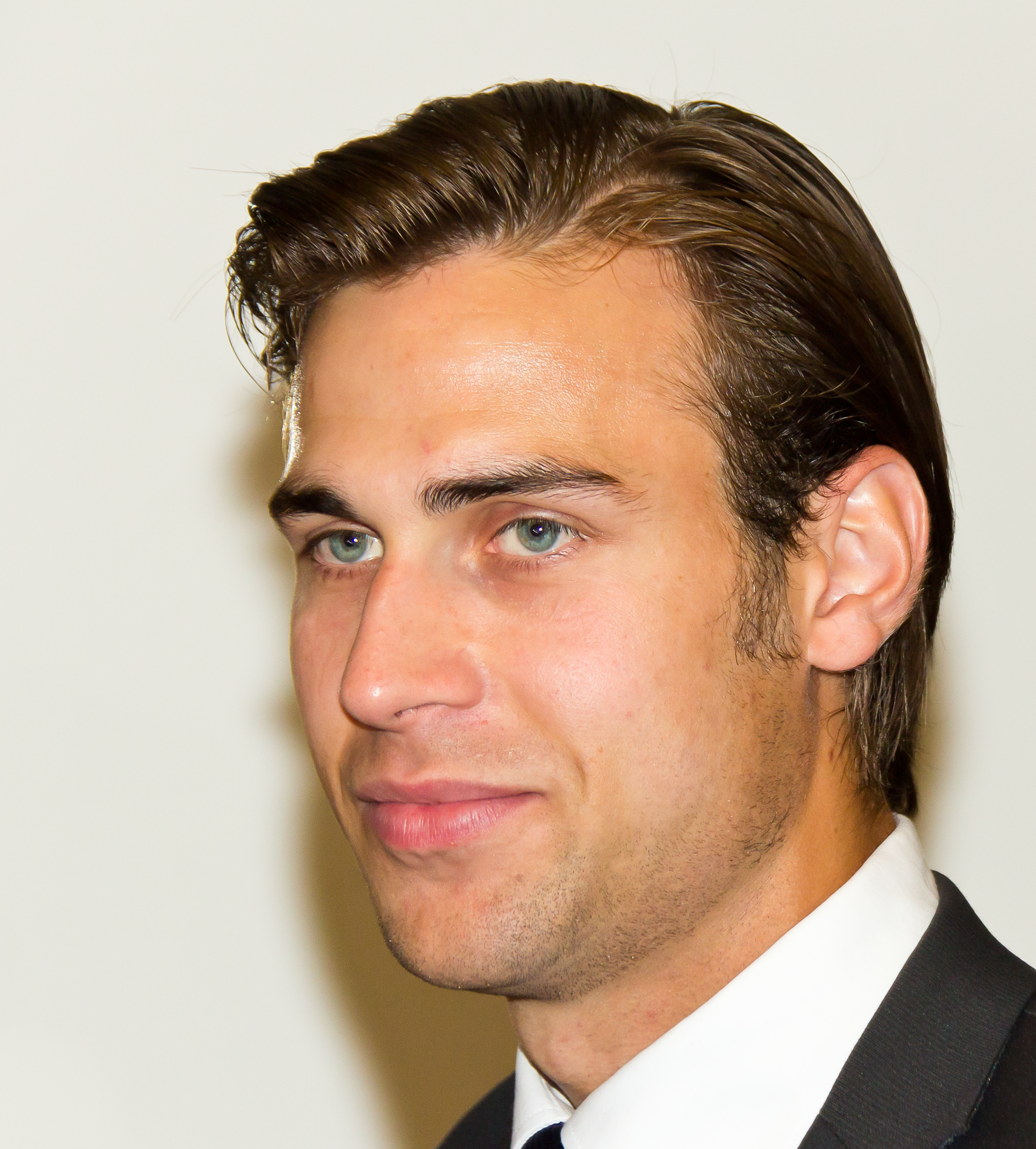
- Zeller in 2012

Personal information
- Born: 14 September 1984 (age 41) Munich, West Germany
- Height: 185 cm (6 ft 1 in)
- Weight: 88 kg (194 lb)

Sport
- Sport: Field hockey
Medal record
Men's field hockey
Representing Germany
Olympic Games
Gold medal – first place	2008 Beijing	Team
Gold medal – first place	2012 London	Team
Bronze medal – third place	2004 Athens	Team
World Cup
Gold medal – first place	2006 Mönchengladbach	Team
Champions Trophy
Silver medal – second place	2006 Terrassa	Team
EuroHockey
Gold medal – first place	2003 Barcelona	Team

Christopher Zeller (born 14 September 1984) is a German national representative field hockey player. As of 2008, his current club is Rot-Weiss Köln. Zeller represented Germany in the 2004, 2008 and 2012 Summer Olympics.

== Personal life ==
Born in Munich, he is the younger brother of Philipp Zeller.

== Career ==
Zeller was a member of the Men's National Team that won the gold medal at the 2008 Summer Olympics and scored the only goal in the final. Two years earlier, he also won the 2006 Men's Hockey World Cup where he scored two goals in the final match and was chosen as the Most Promising Player of the tournament.

Zeller played in the gold medal match for field hockey at the 2012 Olympics which Germany won.

Awards
Preceded by (Netherlands) Robert van der Horst	WorldHockey Young Player of the Year; 2006	Succeeded by (Australia) Mark Knowles
