= Christopher Wesley =

German field hockey player (born 1987)

Personal information
- Full name: Christopher George Wesley
- Born: 23 June 1987 (age 39) Nuremberg, West Germany
- Height: 1.92 m (6 ft 4 in)
- Weight: 88 kg (194 lb)

Sport
- Sport: Field hockey
- Position: Midfielder / Forward
Senior career
| Years | Team | Caps | Goals |
| 2007–2020 | Nürnberger HTC | - | - |
National team
| Years | Team | Caps | Goals |
| 2005–2016 | Germany | 162 | (28) |
Medal record
Men's field hockey
Representing Germany
Olympic Games
| Gold medal – first place | 2012 London | Team |
| Bronze medal – third place | 2016 Rio de Janeiro | Team |
EuroHockey Championship
| Gold medal – first place | 2011 Mönchengadbach |
| Gold medal – first place | 2013 Boom |
| Silver medal – second place | 2009 Amstelveen |
| Silver medal – second place | 2015 London |
Champions Trophy
| Gold medal – first place | 2014 Bhubaneswar |
| Silver medal – second place | 2009 Melbourne |
EuroHockey Junior Championship
| Bronze medal – third place | 2008 San Sebastián |

Christopher George Wesley (born 23 June 1987) is a German former field hockey player who played as a midfielder or forward. At the 2012 Summer Olympics, he competed for the national team in the men's tournament.

== Career ==
Wesley played his whole career for Nürnberger HTC in the German Bundesliga. He played a total of 162 matches for the national team from 2005 until 2016 in which he scored 28 goals. In April 2020 he announced his retirement from top-level hockey.
