= Mats Grambusch =

German field hockey player

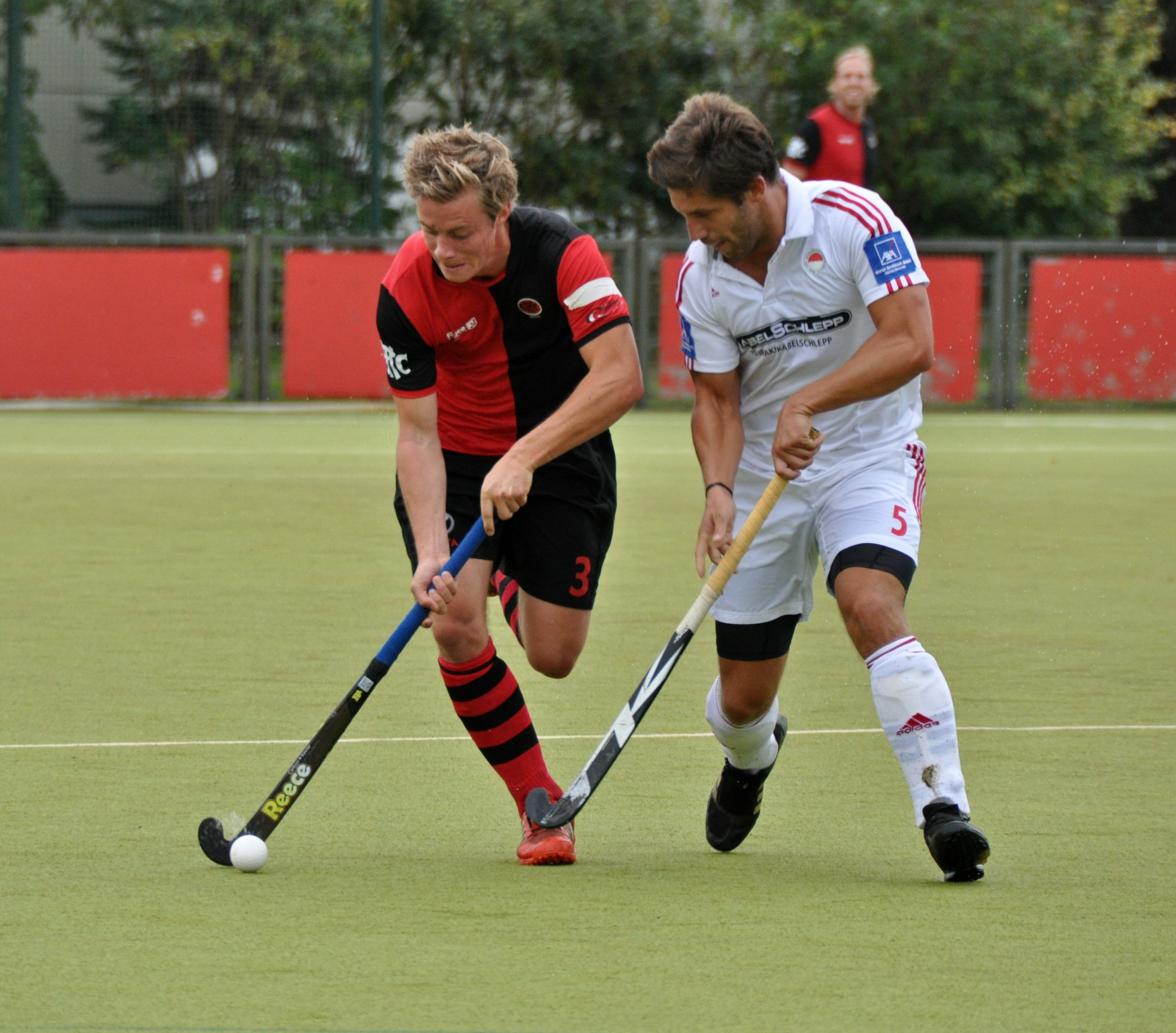
- Grambusch (left) in 2012

Personal information
- Full name: Mats Jürgen Grambusch
- Born: 4 November 1993 (age 32) Mönchengladbach, Germany
- Height: 1.77 m (5 ft 10 in)
- Weight: 74 kg (163 lb)

Sport
- Sport: Field hockey
- Position: Midfielder / Forward
- Club: Gladbacher HTC
Youth career
- Team
- –: Gladbacher HTC
Senior career
Years	Team	Caps	Goals
–2009	Gladbacher HTC	-	-
2009–2011	East Grinstead	-	-
2011–2013	Gladbacher HTC	-	-
2013–2024	Rot-Weiss Köln	-	-
2024–present	Gladbacher HTC	-	-
National team
Years	Team	Caps	Goals
2011–present	Germany	152	(49)
Medal record
Men's field hockey
Representing Germany
Olympic Games
Silver medal – second place	2024 Paris	Team
Bronze medal – third place	2016 Rio de Janeiro	Team
World Cup
Gold medal – first place	2023 Bhubaneswar–Rourkela
EuroHockey Championship
Gold medal – first place	2013 Boom
Gold medal – first place	2025 Mönchengladbach
Silver medal – second place	2015 London
Champions Trophy
Gold medal – first place	2014 Bhubaneswar
Junior World Cup
Gold medal – first place	2013 New Delhi
EuroHockey Junior Championship
Bronze medal – third place	2010 Siemianowice Śląskie
Bronze medal – third place	2012 's-Hertogenbosch
Men's indoor hockey
Indoor World Cup
Silver medal – second place	2018 Berlin
- Updated on 27 May 2025

Mats Jürgen Grambusch (born 4 November 1992) is a German field hockey player who plays as a midfielder or forward for Bundesliga club Gladbacher HTC and the Germany national team.

== Education ==
He was educated at Seaford College.

== Career ==
Grambusch has played for the national team since 2011. He represented his country at the 2016 Summer Olympics, where he won the bronze medal. After the 2024 Summer Olympics, he returned to his boyhood club Gladbacher HTC.
