= Rogier Hofman =

Dutch field hockey player (born 1986)

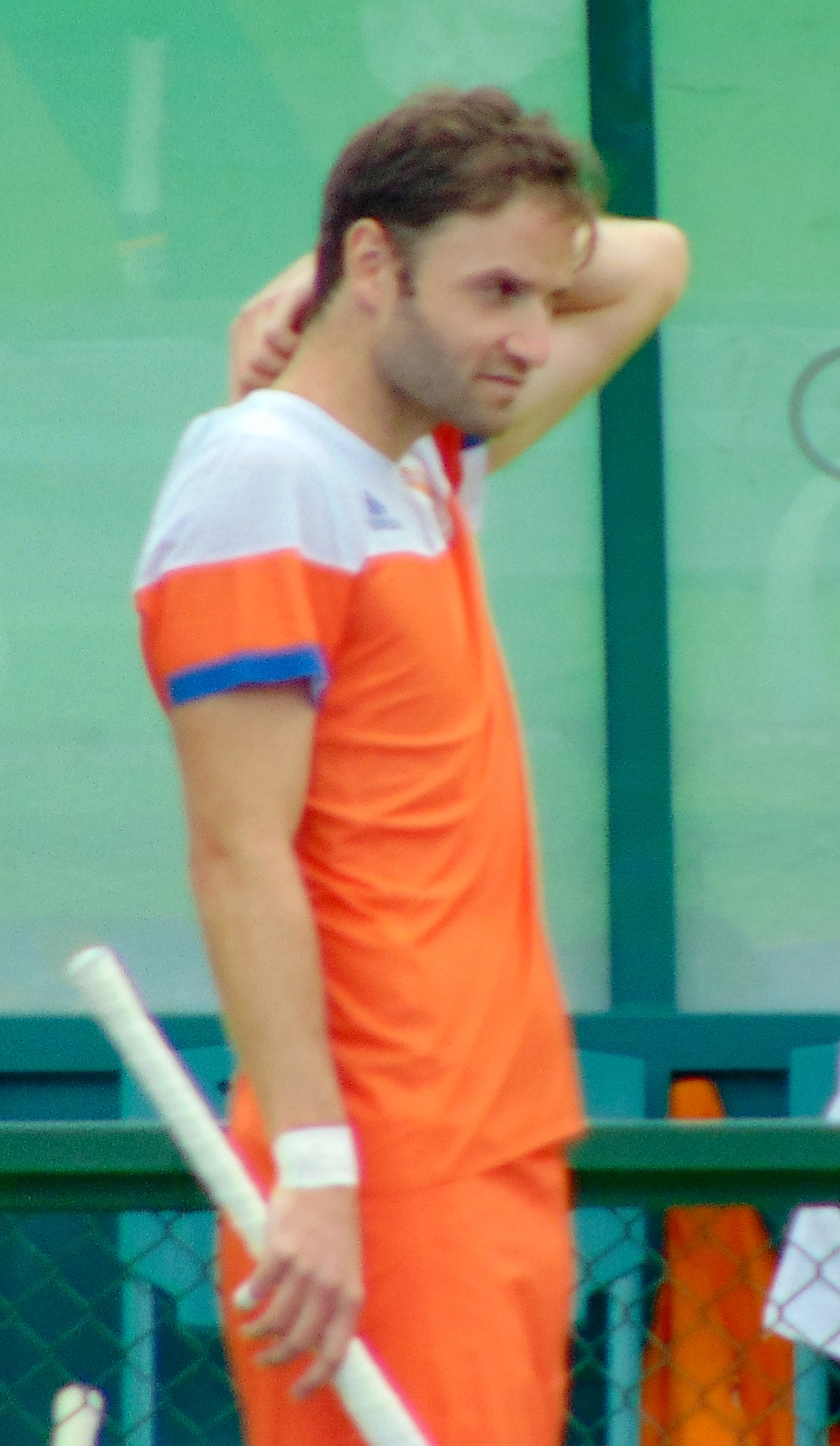
- Hofman at the 2016 Olympics

Personal information
- Full name: Rogier Alexander Hofman
- Born: 5 September 1986 (age 39) Vught, Netherlands
- Height: 1.84 m (6 ft 0 in)
- Weight: 79 kg (174 lb)

Sport
- Sport: Field hockey
- Position: Midfielder
Senior career
Years	Team	Caps	Goals
–2010	SCHC	-	-
2010–2017	Bloemendaal	-	-
National team
Years	Team	Caps	Goals
2006–2016	Netherlands	212	(44)
Medal record
Men's field hockey
Representing the Netherlands
Olympic Games
Silver medal – second place	2012 London	Team
World Cup
Silver medal – second place	2014 The Hague
Bronze medal – third place	2010 New Delhi
EuroHockey Championship
Gold medal – first place	2015 London
Silver medal – second place	2011 Mönchengladbach
Bronze medal – third place	2009 Amstelveen
Bronze medal – third place	2013 Boom
Champions Trophy
Silver medal – second place	2012 Melbourne
Bronze medal – third place	2007 Kuala Lumpur
Bronze medal – third place	2010 Mönchengladbach
Bronze medal – third place	2011 Auckland

Rogier Alexander Hofman (born 5 September 1986) is a Dutch former field hockey player who played as a midfielder.

== Personal life ==
In 2012, together with teammate Tim Jenniskens he launched the Sport Helps foundation, which organises sports events for disabled or seriously ill children.

== Club career ==
Hofman took up field hockey aged eight. Hofman played for SCHC before he joined Bloemendaal in 2010. He retired in 2017 after losing the Dutch championship semi-final to Kampong.

== International career ==
He was part of the Dutch national team for the 2007 World Championships in Mönchengladbach, where the team finished in a disappointing seventh place. He won a silver medal at the 2012 Olympics, placing fourth in 2016.
