= Billy Bakker =

Dutch field hockey player (born 1988)

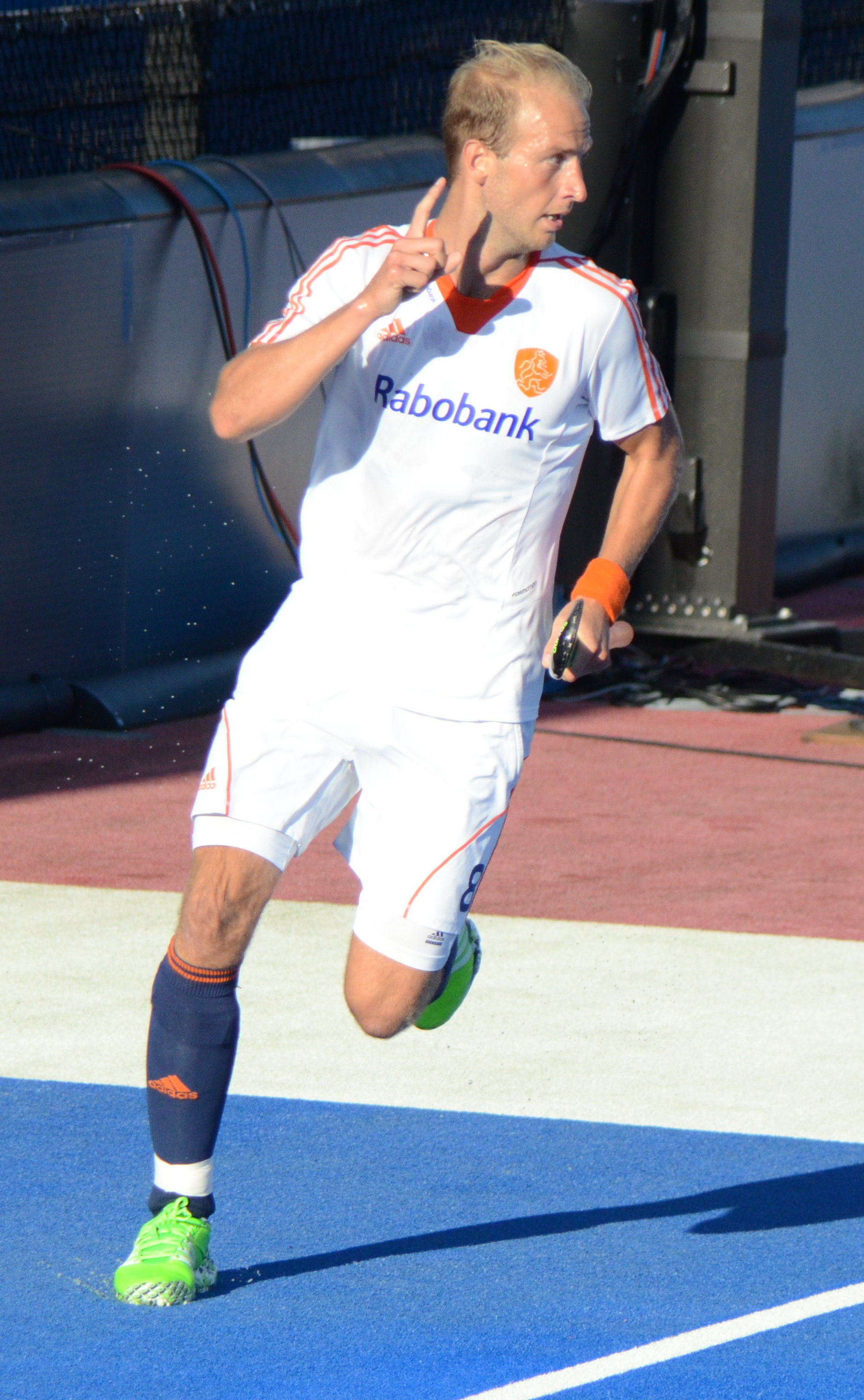
- Bakker in 2015

Personal information
- Full name: Billy Pierre Bakker
- Born: 23 November 1988 (age 37) Amsterdam, Netherlands
- Height: 1.88 m (6 ft 2 in)
- Weight: 82 kg (181 lb)

Sport
- Sport: Field hockey
- Position: Midfielder / Forward
Youth career
- Years: Team
- 1995–1999: Randwijck
- 1999–2007: Amsterdam
Senior career
Years	Team	Caps	Goals
2007–2021	Amsterdam	-	-
2017	Kalinga Lancers	-	-
National team
Years	Team	Caps	Goals
2009–2021	Netherlands	236	(65)
Medal record
Men's field hockey
Representing Netherlands
Olympic Games
Silver medal – second place	2012 London	Team
World Cup
Silver medal – second place	2014 The Hague
Silver medal – second place	2018 Bhubaneswar
Bronze medal – third place	2010 New Delhi
EuroHockey Championship
Gold medal – first place	2015 London
Gold medal – first place	2017 Amstelveen
Gold medal – first place	2021 Amstelveen
Silver medal – second place	2011 Mönchengladbach
Bronze medal – third place	2013 Boom
Bronze medal – third place	2019 Antwerp
Champions Trophy
Silver medal – second place	2012 Melbourne
Bronze medal – third place	2010 Mönchengladbach
Bronze medal – third place	2011 Auckland
Hockey World League
Gold medal – first place	2012–13 New Delhi	Team

Billy Pierre Bakker (Dutch pronunciation: [ˈbɪli ˈbɑkər]; born 23 November 1988) is a Dutch former field hockey player who played as a midfielder or forward for the Netherlands national team.

Bakker scored a total of 65 goals in 236 appearances for the national team from 2009 until 2021.

== Club career ==
Bakker started playing hockey at age six at Randwijck. When he was 10 years old he moved to Amsterdam, where he made his debut in the first senior team in 2007. In 2012 he became the captain of the team. He won the Dutch national title in 2010–11 and 2011–12. In 2017 he played a season in the Hockey India League for the Kalinga Lancers, helping them win the title.

== International career ==
Bakker made his debut for the national team on 28 November 2009 at the 2009 Men's Hockey Champions Trophy. At the 2012 Summer Olympics, he competed for the national team in the men's tournament, winning a silver medal. He was the captain of the Netherlands national team at the 2018 World Cup, where they won the silver medal. In 2017 and 2018, Bakker was nominated for the FIH Player of the Year Award. After the 2020 Summer Olympics, he announced his retirement from the national team.

== Honours ==
=== Club ===
Amsterdam

- Hoofdklasse: 2010–11, 2011–12
- Gold Cup: 2018–19

Kalinga Lancers

- Hockey India League: 2017

=== International ===
Netherlands

- EuroHockey Championship: 2015, 2017, 2021
- Hockey World League: 2012–13
