= Mink van der Weerden =

Dutch field hockey player (born 1988)

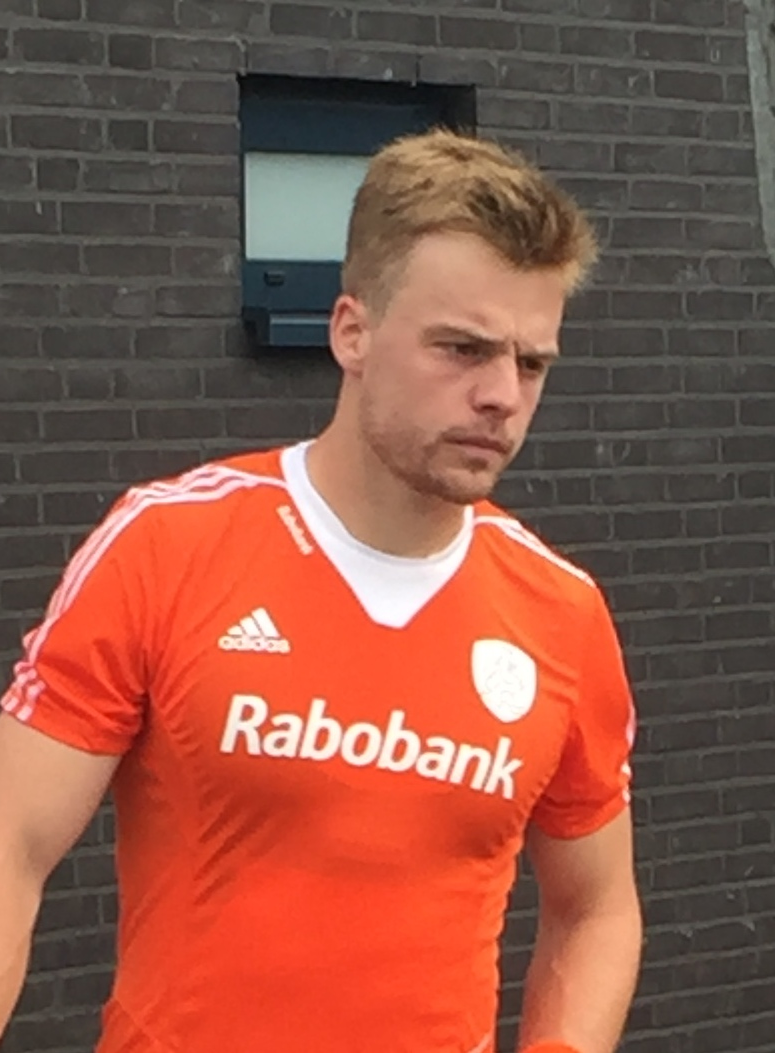
- Van der Weerden in 2016

Personal information
- Full name: Mink Alphons Louis van der Weerden
- Born: 19 October 1988 (age 37) Geldrop, Netherlands
- Height: 1.78 m (5 ft 10 in)
- Weight: 83 kg (183 lb)

Sport
- Sport: Field hockey
- Position: Defender
Youth career
- Team
- –: HCAS
Senior career
Years	Team	Caps	Goals
2008–2016	Oranje Zwart	-	-
2016–2020	Oranje-Rood	-	-
2020–2023	Rot-Weiss Köln	-	-
National team
Years	Team	Caps	Goals
2010–2021	Netherlands	191	(115)
Medal record
Men's field hockey
Representing the Netherlands
Olympic Games
Silver medal – second place	2012 London	Team
World Cup
Silver medal – second place	2014 The Hague
Silver medal – second place	2018 Bhubaneswar
EuroHockey Championship
Gold medal – first place	2015 London
Gold medal – first place	2017 Amstelveen
Gold medal – first place	2021 Amstelveen
Bronze medal – third place	2013 Boom
Bronze medal – third place	2019 Antwerp
Champions Trophy
Bronze medal – third place	2010 Mönchengladbach
Bronze medal – third place	2011 Auckland
Hockey World League
Gold medal – first place	2012–13 New Delhi	Team

Mink Alphons Louis van der Weerden (Dutch pronunciation: [ˈmɪŋk fɑn dər ˈʋeːrdə(n)]; born 19 October 1988) is a Dutch former field hockey player who played as a defender.

He started playing hockey at HCAS and has since also played for Oranje Zwart and Oranje-Rood. He joined Rot-Weiss Köln in the summer of 2020. Van der Weerden made his debut for the national team in 2010 and has since played in three Olympic Games, two World Cups and three European Championships. He studies physiotherapy.

== Club career ==
Van der Weerden took up field hockey aged 10 in 2000 following his mother at HCAS. Later he moved to Oranje Zwart. After Oranje Zwart merged in 2016 with EMHC he signed a four-year contract for the newly formed club HC Oranje-Rood. On 29 January 2020 it was announced he would join Rot-Weiss Köln at the end of the season. In the 2021–22 season he won his second Bundesliga title in a row.

== International career ==
At the 2012 Summer Olympics, he competed for the national team in the men's tournament where the Netherlands won silver. A penalty corner specialist, he was credited with the second victory in group play, over Belgium. He also had a goal in the final against Germany, and ended as the tournament's top scorer with eight goals. In June 2019, he was selected in the Netherlands squad for the 2019 EuroHockey Championship. They won the bronze medal by defeating Germany 4–0. After the 2020 Summer Olympics van der Weerden announced his retirement from the national team.

== Honours ==
=== International ===
Netherlands

- Olympic silver medal: 2012
- European Championship: 2015, 2017, 2021
- Hockey World League: 2012–13

=== Club ===
Oranje Zwart

- Euro Hockey League: 2014–15
- Hoofdklasse: 2013–14, 2014–15, 2015–16

Rot-Weiss Köln

- Bundesliga: 2019–2021, 2021–22, 2022–23

=== Individual ===
- Olympic top goalscorer: 2012
- Champions Trophy top goalscorer: 2010, 2014
- Hoofdklasse top goalscorer: 2013–14
