= Florian Fuchs =

German field hockey player

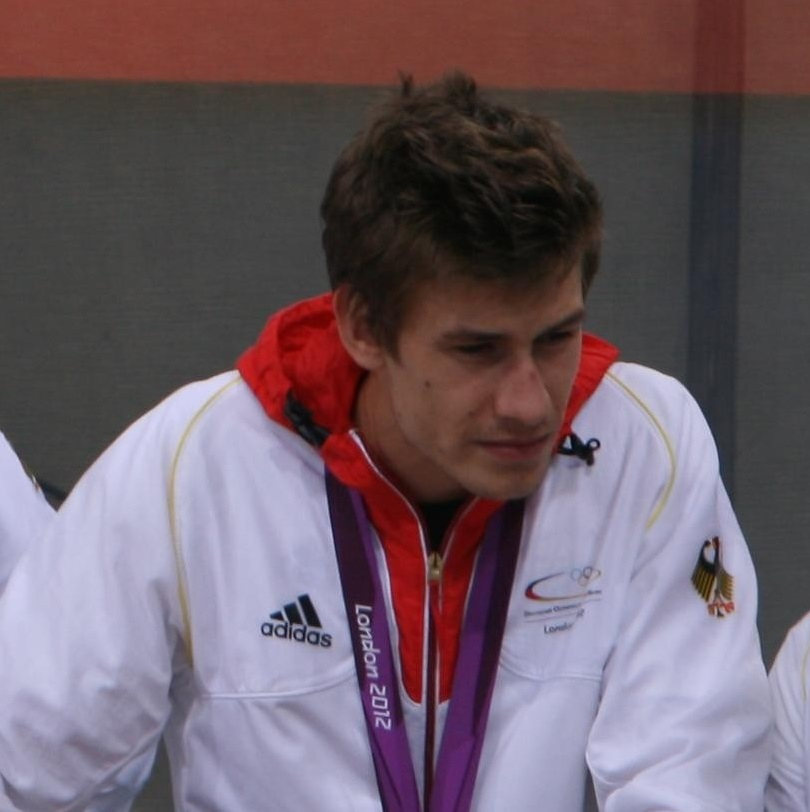

Personal information
- Born: 10 November 1991 (age 34) Hamburg, Germany
- Height: 1.85 m (6 ft 1 in)
- Weight: 74 kg (163 lb)

Sport
- Sport: Field hockey
- Position: Forward
Senior career
Years	Team	Caps	Goals
2008–2016	UHC Hamburg	-	-
2016	→ Dabang Mumbai	-	-
2016–2022	Bloemendaal	-	-
National team
Years	Team	Caps	Goals
2009–2021	Germany	239	(116)
Medal record
Men's field hockey
Representing Germany
Olympic Games
Gold medal – first place	2012 London	Team
Bronze medal – third place	2016 Rio de Janeiro	Team
World Cup
Silver medal – second place	2010 New Delhi
EuroHockey Championship
Gold medal – first place	2011 Mönchengladbach
Gold medal – first place	2013 Boom
Silver medal – second place	2015 London
Silver medal – second place	2021 Amstelveen
Champions Trophy
Gold medal – first place	2014 Bhubaneswar
Silver medal – second place	2009 Melbourne
Bronze medal – third place	2016 London
Junior World Cup
Gold medal – first place	2009 Johor Bahru–Singapore
- Updated on 24 July 2021

Florian Fuchs (born 10 November 1991) is a German former field hockey player who played as a forward.

== Career ==
At the 2012 Summer Olympics, he competed for the national team in the men's tournament. After the 2016 Summer Olympic, where he won the bronze medal, he transferred from Hamburg to Dutch club Bloemendaal. In the 2018–19 season, he won his first national title by defeating Kampong in the Dutch championship final with Bloemendaal. On 28 May 2021, he was named in the squads for the 2021 EuroHockey Championship and the 2020 Summer Olympics. Fuchs was named the FIH Young Player of the Year in 2012.

In September 2021, Fuchs announced that he was retiring from international hockey. After the following season he also retired from club hockey. In his last season with Bloemendaal he won the Euro Hockey League and the Dutch national title.

== Honours ==
=== International ===
Germany

- Summer Olympics gold medal: 2012
- Summer Olympics bronze medal: 2016
- EuroHockey Championship: 2011, 2013
- Champions Trophy, 2014

Germany U21

- Junior World Cup: 2009

=== Club ===
UHC Hamburg

- Euro Hockey League: 2009–10, 2011–12

Bloemendaal

- Hoofdklasse: 2018–19, 2020–21, 2021–22
- Euro Hockey League: 2017–18, 2021, 2022, 2022–23

=== Individual ===
- FIH Rising Star of the Year: 2012

Preceded by Matthew Swann	FIH Young Player of the Year; 2012	Succeeded by Christopher Rühr
