= Argentina at the 2008 Summer Olympics =

- IOC code: ARG
- NOC: Argentine Olympic Committee
- Website: www.coarg.org.ar (in Spanish)

in Beijing
- Competitors: 137 in 19 sports
- Flag bearers: Manu Ginóbili (opening); Juan Curuchet (closing)
- Medals Ranked 35th: Gold 2 Silver 0 Bronze 4 Total 6

Summer Olympics appearances (overview)
- 1900; 1904; 1908; 1912; 1920; 1924; 1928; 1932; 1936; 1948; 1952; 1956; 1960; 1964; 1968; 1972; 1976; 1980; 1984; 1988; 1992; 1996; 2000; 2004; 2008; 2012; 2016; 2020; 2024; 2028

Argentina competed at the 2008 Summer Olympics held in Beijing, China, from 8 to 24 August 2008. 137 athletes qualified for the Olympic Games in 19 sports. Manu Ginóbili, basketball player and gold medalist at the 2004 Summer Olympics, was the nation's flag bearer at the opening ceremony.

== Medalists ==
Medal	Name	Sport	Event	Date
Gold	Walter Pérez; Juan Curuchet	Cycling	Men's madison	August 19
Gold	Argentina national football team: Lautaro Acosta; Sergio Agüero; Éver Banega; Diego Buonanotte; Ángel Di María; Federico Fazio; Fernando Gago; Ezequiel Garay; Ezequiel Lavezzi; Javier Mascherano; Lionel Messi; Luciano Fabián Monzón; Nicolás Pareja; Juan Román Riquelme; Sergio Romero; José Ernesto Sosa; Óscar Ustari; Pablo Zabaleta	Football	Men's tournament	August 23
Bronze	Paula Pareto	Judo	Women's 48 kg	August 9
Bronze	Carlos Espínola; Santiago Lange	Sailing	Men's Tornado	August 21
Bronze	Argentina women's hockey team: Magdalena Aicega; Luciana Aymar; Noel Barrionuevo; Claudia Burkart; Soledad García; Mariana González Oliva; Alejandra Gulla; María de la Paz Hernández; Giselle Kañevsky; Rosario Luchetti; Mercedes Margalot; Carla Rebecchi; Mariana Rossi; Mariné Russo; Belén Succi; Paola Vukojicic	Field hockey	Women's tournament	August 22
Bronze	Argentina national basketball team: Carlos Delfino; Manu Ginóbili; Román González; Juan Pedro Gutiérrez; Leonardo Gutiérrez; Federico Kammerichs; Andrés Nocioni; Fabricio Oberto; Antonio Porta; Pablo Prigioni; Paolo Quinteros; Luis Scola	Basketball	Men's tournament	August 24

== Athletics ==
Key

- Note–Ranks given for track events are within the athlete's heat only
- Q = Qualified for the next round
- q = Qualified for the next round as a fastest loser or, in field events, by position without achieving the qualifying target
- NR = National record
- N/A = Round not applicable for the event
- Bye = Athlete not required to compete in round

Men
Track & road events

Athlete	Event	Heat		Semifinal		Final	
Athlete	Event	Result	Rank	Result	Rank	Result	Rank
Juan Manuel Cano	20 km walk	—N/a				1:27:17	40
Javier Carriqueo	1500 m	3:39.36	7	Did not advance			
Leonardo Price	800 m	1:49.39	6	Did not advance			

Field events

Athlete	Event	Qualification		Final	
Athlete	Event	Distance	Position	Distance	Position
Jorge Balliengo	Discus throw	58.82	30	Did not advance	
Germán Chiaraviglio	Pole vault	NM	—	Did not advance	
Juan Ignacio Cerra	Hammer throw	70.16	30	Did not advance	
Germán Lauro	Shot put	19.07	32	Did not advance	
Pablo Pietrobelli	Javelin throw	69.09	34	Did not advance	

Women
Field events

Athlete	Event	Qualification		Final	
Athlete	Event	Distance	Position	Distance	Position
Rocío Comba	Discus throw	51.36	36	Did not advance	
Alejandra García	Pole vault	4.15	31	Did not advance	
Jennifer Dahlgren	Hammer throw	66.35	29	Did not advance	

== Basketball ==
=== Men's tournament ===
Argentina's men's basketball team, the defending Olympic champions, qualified for the Olympics by placing second at the FIBA Americas Championship 2007, and marked its fifth Olympic appearance.

The women's team finished fourth at the FIBA Americas Championship for Women 2007, and will be one of twelve teams vying for the final five Olympic spots at the FIBA World Olympic Qualifying Tournament for Women 2008.

Roster

The following is the Argentina roster in the men's basketball tournament of the 2008 Summer Olympics.

Argentina men's national basketball team – 2008 Summer Olympics roster
Players
Coaches

Pos.	No.	Name	Age – Date of birth	Height	Club	Ctr.
F/C	4	Luis Scola (C)	28 – April 30, 1980	6 ft 9 in (2.06 m)	Houston Rockets	(United States)
SG	5	Manu Ginóbili	31 – July 28, 1977	6 ft 6 in (1.98 m)	San Antonio Spurs	(United States)
C	6	Román González	30 – January 28, 1978	6 ft 11 in (2.11 m)	Peñarol	(Argentina)
C	7	Fabricio Oberto	33 – March 21, 1975	6 ft 10 in (2.08 m)	San Antonio Spurs	(United States)
PG	8	Pablo Prigioni	31 – May 17, 1977	6 ft 4 in (1.93 m)	TAU Cerámica	(Spain)
PG	9	Antonio Porta	24 – October 28, 1983	6 ft 3 in (1.91 m)	Spartak Saint Petersburg	(Russia)
SG	10	Carlos Delfino	25 – August 29, 1982	6 ft 7 in (2.01 m)	Khimki	(Russia)
PG	11	Paolo Quinteros	29 – January 15, 1979	6 ft 2 in (1.88 m)	Basket Zaragoza	(Spain)
PF	12	Leonardo Gutiérrez	30 – May 16, 1978	6 ft 8 in (2.03 m)	Atenas	(Argentina)
SF	13	Andrés Nocioni	28 – November 30, 1979	6 ft 8 in (2.03 m)	Chicago Bulls	(United States)
C	14	Juan Pedro Gutiérrez	24 – October 10, 1983	6 ft 9 in (2.06 m)	Granada	(Spain)
SF	15	Federico Kammerichs	28 – June 21, 1980	6 ft 9 in (2.06 m)	Regatas	(Argentina)

Head coach

- (Argentina) Sergio Hernández

Assistant coach(es)

- (Argentina) Julio Lamas

Legend

- (C) Team captain
- Club – describes last
  club before the tournament
- Age – describes age
  on August 9, 2008

Group play

Pos	Team	Pld	W	L	PF	PA	PD	Pts	Qualification
1	Lithuania	5	4	1	425	400	+25	9 (Note: Head-to-head record: Lithuania 1–0 Argentina)	Quarterfinals
2	Argentina	5	4	1	425	361	+64	9	Quarterfinals
3	Croatia	5	3	2	399	380	+19	8 (Note: Head-to-head record: Croatia 1–0 Australia)	Quarterfinals
4	Australia	5	3	2	457	405	+52	8	Quarterfinals
5	Russia	5	1	4	387	406	−19	6	
6	Iran	5	0	5	323	464	−141	5	

Source: FIBA archive
Rules for classification: 1) points; 2) head-to-head points; 3) head-to-head goal average; 4) head-to-head number of points scored.
Notes:

10 August 2008
16:45

Report

Lithuania	79–75	Argentina
Scoring by quarter: 14–11, 20–19, 17–15, 28–30
Pts: Kleiza 13; Rebs: K. Lavrinovič 7 Asts: Jasikevičius 8		Pts: Ginobili 19; Rebs: Oberto 11; Asts: Oberto, Prigioni 3

Wukesong Indoor Stadium, Beijing
Attendance: 11,083
Referees: Nikolaos Zavlanos (GRE)

12 August 2008
22:15

Report

Argentina	85–68	Australia
Scoring by quarter: 23–11, 16–18, 24–17, 22–22
Pts: Ginobili 21; Rebs: Nocioni 8 Asts: Ginobili 7		Pts: Mills 22; Rebs: Andersen 6 Asts: Bogut, Bruton 2

Wukesong Indoor Stadium, Beijing
Attendance: 11,083
Referees: Nikolaos Pitsilkas (GRE)

14 August 2008
22:15

Report

Argentina	77–53	Croatia
Scoring by quarter: 21–13, 19–9, 19–16, 18–15
Pts: Nocioni 18; Rebs: Nocioni 8 Asts: Ginobili 8		Pts: Tomas, Banić 9 Rebs: Banić 6 Asts: Ukić 2

Wukesong Indoor Stadium, Beijing
Attendance: 11,083
Referees: Juan Carlos Arteaga (ESP)

16 August 2008
16:45

Report

Iran	82–97	Argentina
Scoring by quarter: 14–19, 19–23, 24–30, 25–25
Pts: Haddadi 21; Rebs: Haddadi 16; Asts: Kamrani 4		Pts: Ginobili 32; Rebs: Scola 7 Asts: Prigioni 6

Wukesong Indoor Stadium, Beijing
Attendance: 11,083
Referees: Nikolaos Pitsilkas (GRE)

18 August 2008
22:15

Report

Argentina	91–79	Russia
Scoring by quarter: 27–16, 18–23, 27–25, 19–15
Pts: Scola 37; Rebs: Nocioni 9 Asts: Prigioni 10		Pts: Kirilenko 23; Rebs: Kirilenko 9 Asts: Holden 5

Wukesong Indoor Stadium, Beijing
Attendance: 11,083
Referees: Nikolaos Zavlanos (GRE)

Quarterfinals

20 August 2008
22:15

Report

Argentina	80–78	Greece
Scoring by quarter: 22–23, 17–17, 17–15, 24–23
Scoring by half: 39–40, 41–38
Pts: Ginobili 24; Rebs: Scola 8 Asts: Prigioni 3		Pts: Fotsis 17; Rebs: Fotsis 10; Asts: Papaloukas 4

Wukesong Indoor Stadium, Beijing
Attendance: 11,083
Referees: Romualdas Brazauskas (LTU)

Semifinals

22 August 2008
22:00

Report

Argentina	81–101	United States
Scoring by quarter: 11–30, 29–19, 24–29, 17–23
Scoring by half: 40–49, 41–52
Pts: Scola 28; Rebs: Scola 11; Asts: Prigioni 3		Pts: Anthony 21; Rebs: Bosh 10; Asts: Kidd 7

Wukesong Indoor Stadium, Beijing
Attendance: 11,083
Referees: Luigi Lamonica (ITA)

Bronze medal game

24 August 2008
12:00

Report

Lithuania	75–87	Argentina (bronze)
Scoring by quarter: 21–24, 13–22, 15–22, 26–19
Scoring by half: 34–46, 41–41
Pts: Šiškauskas 15; Rebs: Šiškauskas, K. Lavrinovič 6 Asts: Jasikevičius 3		Pts: Delfino 20; Rebs: Delfino 10; Asts: Prigioni 7

Wukesong Indoor Stadium, Beijing
Attendance: 11,083
Referees: Eddie Rush (USA)

== Boxing ==
Argentina had one boxer qualify for the Olympics. Ezequiel Maderna earned a spot in the middleweight competition after coming in second at the 2nd AIBA American Olympic Qualifying Tournament.

Athlete	Event	Round of 32	Round of 16	Quarterfinals	Semifinals	Final	
Athlete	Event	Opposition Result	Opposition Result	Opposition Result	Opposition Result	Opposition Result	Rank
Ezequiel Maderna	Middleweight	Estrada (USA); L 2–10	Did not advance				

== Canoeing ==
=== Sprint ===
Athlete	Event	Heats		Semifinals		Final	
Athlete	Event	Time	Rank	Time	Rank	Time	Rank
Miguel Correa	Men's K-1 500 m	1:39.781	5 QS	1:46.422	7	Did not advance	
Miguel Correa	Men's K-1 1000 m	3:45.695	6 QS	3:51.715	9	Did not advance	
Estefania Fontanini	Women's K-1 500 m	2:00.291	8	Did not advance			

Qualification Legend: QS = Qualify to semi-final; QF = Qualify directly to final

== Cycling ==
=== Road ===
Athlete	Event	Time	Rank
Alejandro Borrajo	Men's road race	Did not finish	
Juan José Haedo	Men's road race	Did not finish	
Matías Médici	Men's road race	Did not finish	
Matías Médici	Men's time trial	1:07:53	30

=== Track ===
Omnium

Athlete	Event	Points	Laps	Rank
Juan Curuchet	Men's points race	1	0	18
Juan Curuchet; Walter Pérez	Men's madison	8	0	1st place, gold medalist(s)

=== Mountain biking ===
Athlete	Event	Time	Rank
Darío Gasco	Men's cross-country	2:07:04	27

=== BMX ===
Athlete	Event	Seeding		Quarterfinals		Semifinals		Final	
Athlete	Event	Result	Rank	Points	Rank	Points	Rank	Result	Rank
Cristian Becerine	Men's BMX	37.253	27	11	2 Q	15	5	Did not advance	
Ramiro Marino	Men's BMX	36.768	21	20	8	Did not advance			
Gabriela Díaz	Women's BMX	37.590	5	—N/a		13	3 Q	39.747	5
María Belén Dutto	Women's BMX	40.193	14	—N/a		20	7	Did not advance	

== Equestrian ==
=== Show jumping ===
Athlete	Horse	Event	Qualification								Final					Total	
Athlete	Horse	Event	Round 1		Round 2			Round 3			Round A		Round B			Total	
Athlete	Horse	Event	Penalties	Rank	Penalties	Total	Rank	Penalties	Total	Rank	Penalties	Rank	Penalties	Total	Rank	Penalties	Rank
José Larocca	Royal Power	Individual	14	66	16	30	59	Did not advance								30	59

== Fencing ==
Men

Athlete	Event	Round of 32	Round of 16	Quarterfinal	Semifinal	Final / BM	
Athlete	Event	Opposition Score	Opposition Score	Opposition Score	Opposition Score	Opposition Score	Rank
Alberto González Viaggio	Individual foil	Zhu J (CHN); L 2–15	Did not advance				

== Field hockey ==
Argentina qualified a team to the women's field hockey tournament. In the group play, they won three matches and drew two, finishing second in the group. This qualified them for the semifinal, which they lost to the Netherlands. In the bronze medal match however, they defeated Germany, winning the bronze medal and finishing third in the tournament.

=== Women's tournament ===
Roster

The following is the Argentine roster in the women's field hockey tournament of the 2008 Summer Olympics.

Head Coach: Gabriel Minadeo

1. Belén Succi (GK)
3. Magdalena Aicega (c)
4. Rosario Luchetti
7. Alejandra Gulla
8. Luciana Aymar
10. Agustina García
11. Carla Rebecchi
12. Mariana González Oliva
14. Mercedes Margalot
15. María de la Paz Hernández
16. Mariana Rossi
18. Paola Vukojicic (GK)
19. Mariné Russo
24. Claudia Burkart
26. Giselle Kañevsky
27. Noel Barrionuevo

Reserve:

9. Silvina D'Elía
25. Agustina Bouza

Group play

Team	Pld	W	D	L	GF	GA	GD	Pts	Qualification
Germany	5	4	0	1	12	8	+4	12	Advanced to semifinals
Argentina	5	3	2	0	13	7	+6	11	Advanced to semifinals
Great Britain	5	2	2	1	7	9	−2	8	
United States	5	1	3	1	9	8	+1	6	
Japan	5	1	1	3	5	7	−2	4	
New Zealand	5	0	0	5	6	13	−7	0	

10 August 2008
18:30

Argentina	2–2	United States
Rebecchi 5', 11'	Report	Smith 18'; Loy 64'

Umpires:
Julie Ashton-Lucy (AUS)
Carol Metchette (IRL)

12 August 2008
08:30

Argentina	2–2	Great Britain
García 10'; Gulla 27'	Report	Thomas 49'; Clewlow 51'

Umpires:
Marelize de Klerk (RSA)
Stella Bartlema (NED)

14 August 2008
18:30

Japan	1–2	Argentina
Miura 64'	Report	Gulla 38'; Burkart 51'

Umpires:
Miao Lin (CHN)
Gina Spitaleri (ITA)

16 August 2008
18:00

Germany	0–4	Argentina
	Report	Burkart 38'; Gulla 49', 66'; Aymar 68'

Umpires:
Lisa Roach (AUS)
Chieko Soma (JPN)

18 August 2008
20:30

Argentina	3–2	New Zealand
Rebecchi 15'; García 43'; Hernández 46'	Report	Roberts 33'; Igasan 61'

Umpires:
Gina Spitaleri (ITA)
Marelize de Klerk (RSA)

Semifinal

20 August 2008
20:30

Netherlands	5–2	Argentina
Paumen 9', 25', 47'; Agliotti 31'; Hoog 68'	Report	Russo 59'; Gulla 69'

Umpires:
Marelize de Klerk (RSA)
Sarah Garnett (NZL)

Bronze medal match

22 August 2008
18:00

Germany	1–3	Argentina (bronze)
Kühn 45'	Report	Luchetti 11'; Rebecchi 22'; Barrionuevo 63'

Umpires:
Julie Ashton-Lucy (AUS)
Marelize de Klerk (RSA)

== Football ==
=== Men's tournament ===
Roster

Sergio Batista, head coach of the men's football team, announced his final squad for the Olympics on 3 July. Pareja takes the place of Burdisso, whose club did not grant permission. The following is the Argentina squad in the men's football tournament of the 2008 Summer Olympics.

Head coach: Sergio Batista

No.	Pos.	Player	Date of birth (age)	Caps	Goals	Club
1	GK	Óscar Ustari	3 July 1986 (aged 22)	1	0	(Royal Spanish Football Federation) Getafe
2	DF	Ezequiel Garay	10 October 1986 (aged 21)	1	0	(Royal Spanish Football Federation) Real Madrid
3	DF	Fabián Monzón	13 April 1987 (aged 21)	0	0	(Argentine Football Association) Boca Juniors
4	DF	Pablo Zabaleta	16 January 1985 (aged 23)	5	0	(Royal Spanish Football Federation) Espanyol
5	MF	Fernando Gago	10 April 1986 (aged 22)	9	0	(Royal Spanish Football Federation) Real Madrid
6	DF	Federico Fazio	17 March 1987 (aged 21)	0	0	(Royal Spanish Football Federation) Sevilla
7	MF	José Sosa	19 June 1985 (aged 23)	2	0	(German Football Association) Bayern Munich
8	MF	Éver Banega	29 June 1988 (aged 20)	0	0	(Royal Spanish Football Federation) Valencia
9	FW	Ezequiel Lavezzi	3 May 1985 (aged 23)	2	0	(Italian Football Federation) Napoli
10	MF	Juan Román Riquelme* (c)	24 June 1978 (aged 30)	42	18	(Argentine Football Association) Boca Juniors
11	MF	Ángel Di María	14 February 1988 (aged 20)	0	0	(Portuguese Football Federation) Benfica
12	DF	Nicolás Pareja*	18 January 1984 (aged 24)	0	0	(Royal Belgian Football Association) Anderlecht
13	FW	Lautaro Acosta	14 March 1988 (aged 20)	0	0	(Royal Spanish Football Federation) Sevilla
14	MF	Javier Mascherano*	8 June 1984 (aged 24)	37	2	(The Football Association) Liverpool
15	FW	Lionel Messi	24 June 1987 (aged 21)	26	8	(Royal Spanish Football Federation) Barcelona
16	FW	Sergio Agüero	2 June 1988 (aged 20)	7	2	(Royal Spanish Football Federation) Atlético Madrid
17	FW	Diego Buonanotte	19 April 1988 (aged 20)	0	0	(Argentine Football Association) River Plate
18	GK	Sergio Romero	22 February 1987 (aged 21)	0	0	(Royal Dutch Football Association) AZ
22	GK	Nicolás Navarro (Note: Replaces Óscar Ustari who was injured during the competition)	25 March 1985 (aged 23)	0	0	(Italian Football Federation) Napoli

* Over-aged player.

Notes

Group play

Pos	Team	Pld	W	D	L	GF	GA	GD	Pts	Qualification
1	Argentina	3	3	0	0	5	1	+4	9	Qualified for the quarterfinals
2	Ivory Coast	3	2	0	1	6	4	+2	6	Qualified for the quarterfinals
3	Australia	3	0	1	2	1	3	−2	1	
4	Serbia	3	0	1	2	3	7	−4	1	

7 August 2008
19:45

Ivory Coast	1–2	Argentina
Cissé 53'	Report	Messi 43'; Acosta 86'

Shanghai Stadium, Shanghai
Attendance: 43,266
Referee: Wolfgang Stark (Germany)
10 August 2008
17:00

Argentina	1–0	Australia
Lavezzi 76'	Report

Shanghai Stadium, Shanghai
Attendance: 38,182
Referee: Viktor Kassai (Hungary)
13 August 2008
19:45

Argentina	2–0	Serbia
Lavezzi 13' (pen.); Buonanotte 84'	Report

Beijing Workers' Stadium, Beijing
Attendance: 53,668
Referee: Abdullah Al Hilali (Oman)

Quarterfinals

16 August 2008
21:00

Argentina	2–1 (a.e.t.)	Netherlands
Messi 14'; Di María 105'	Report	Bakkal 36'

Shanghai Stadium, Shanghai
Attendance: 51,366
Referee: Jair Marrufo (United States)

Semifinals

19 August 2008
21:00

Argentina	3–0	Brazil
Agüero 52', 58'; Riquelme 76' (pen.)	Report

Beijing Workers' Stadium, Beijing
Attendance: 52,968
Referee: Martín Vázquez (Uruguay)

Gold medal game

23 August 2008
12:00

(silver) Nigeria	0–1	Argentina (gold)
	Report	Di María 58'

Beijing National Stadium, Beijing
Attendance: 89,102
Referee: Viktor Kassai (Hungary)

Source for cards:

== Final ranking ==
Pos	Team	Pld	W	D	L	GF	GA	GD	Pts
1	Argentina	6	6	0	0	11	2	+9	18
2	Nigeria	6	4	1	1	10	4	+6	13
3	Brazil	6	5	0	1	14	3	+11	15
4	Belgium	6	3	0	3	7	10	−3	9
5	Italy	4	2	1	1	8	3	+5	7
6	Ivory Coast	4	2	0	2	6	6	0	6
7	Netherlands	4	1	2	1	4	4	0	5
8	Cameroon	4	1	2	1	2	3	−1	5
9	United States	3	1	1	1	4	4	0	4
10	South Korea	3	1	1	1	2	4	−2	4
11	Australia	3	0	1	2	1	3	−2	1
12	Serbia	3	0	1	2	3	7	−4	1
13	China	3	0	1	2	1	6	−5	1
14	New Zealand	3	0	1	2	1	7	−6	1
15	Japan	3	0	0	3	1	4	−3	0
16	Honduras	3	0	0	3	0	5	−5	0

Source: IOC

== Statistics ==
=== Goalscorers ===
With four goals, Giuseppe Rossi of Italy was the top scorer in the tournament. In total, 75 goals were scored by 53 different players, with only one of them credited as own goal.

4 goals

- (Italy) Giuseppe Rossi

3 goals

- (Belgium) Mousa Dembélé
- (Nigeria) Victor Obinna

2 goals

- (Argentina) Sergio Agüero
- (Argentina) Ángel Di María
- (Argentina) Ezequiel Lavezzi
- (Argentina) Lionel Messi
- (Belgium) Kevin Mirallas
- (Brazil) Diego
- (Brazil) Jô
- (Brazil) Thiago Neves
- (Brazil) Ronaldinho
- (Brazil) Rafael Sóbis
- (Ivory Coast) Sekou Cissé
- (Ivory Coast) Salomon Kalou
- (Netherlands) Gerald Sibon
- (Nigeria) Chinedu Obasi
- (United States) Sacha Kljestan

1 goal

- (Argentina) Lautaro Acosta
- (Argentina) Diego Buonanotte
- (Argentina) Juan Román Riquelme
- (Australia) Ruben Zadkovich
- (Belgium) Laurent Ciman
- (Belgium) Faris Haroun
- (Brazil) Anderson
- (Brazil) Hernanes
- (Brazil) Marcelo
- (Brazil) Alexandre Pato
- (Cameroon) Georges Mandjeck
- (Cameroon) Stéphane Mbia
- (China) Dong Fangzhuo
- (Italy) Robert Acquafresca
- (Italy) Sebastian Giovinco
- (Italy) Riccardo Montolivo
- (Italy) Tommaso Rocchi
- (Ivory Coast) Gervinho
- (Japan) Yohei Toyoda
- (South Korea) Kim Dong-jin
- (South Korea) Park Chu-young
- (Netherlands) Ryan Babel
- (Netherlands) Otman Bakkal
- (New Zealand) Jeremy Brockie
- (Nigeria) Olubayo Adefemi
- (Nigeria) Victor Anichebe
- (Nigeria) Peter Odemwingie
- (Nigeria) Chibuzor Okonkwo
- (Nigeria) Isaac Promise
- (Serbia) Miljan Mrdaković
- (Serbia) Slobodan Rajković
- (Serbia) Đorđe Rakić
- (United States) Jozy Altidore
- (United States) Stuart Holden

Own goals

- (Serbia) Slobodan Rajković (playing against Ivory Coast)

No.	Pos.	Player	Date of birth (age)	Caps	Goals	Club
1	GK	Guadalupe Calello	13 April 1990 (aged 18)			(Argentine Football Association) River Plate
2	DF	Eva González	2 September 1987 (aged 20)			(Argentine Football Association) Boca Juniors
3	DF	Yesica Arrien	1 July 1980 (aged 28)			(Argentine Football Association) Estudiantes de La Plata
4	MF	Florencia Mandrile	10 February 1988 (aged 20)			(Argentine Football Association) San Lorenzo de Almagro
5	DF	Marisa Gerez (captain)	3 November 1976 (aged 31)			(Argentine Football Association) Boca Juniors
6	DF	Gabriela Chávez	9 April 1989 (aged 19)			(Argentine Football Association) Independiente
7	FW	Ludmila Manicler	6 July 1987 (aged 21)			(Argentine Football Association) Independiente
8	FW	Emilia Mendieta	4 February 1988 (aged 20)			(Argentine Football Association) River Plate
9	FW	Belén Potassa	12 December 1988 (aged 19)			(Argentine Football Association) San Lorenzo de Almagro
10	MF	Mariela Coronel	20 June 1981 (aged 27)			(Royal Spanish Football Federation) Prainsa Zaragoza
11	MF	Fabiana Vallejos	30 July 1985 (aged 23)			(Argentine Football Association) Boca Juniors
12	DF	Daiana Cardone	1 January 1989 (aged 19)			(Argentine Football Association) Independiente
13	MF	Florencia Quiñones	26 August 1986 (aged 21)			(Argentine Football Association) San Lorenzo de Almagro
14	FW	Andrea Ojeda	17 January 1985 (aged 23)			(Argentine Football Association) Boca Juniors
15	FW	Mercedes Pereyra	7 May 1987 (aged 21)			(Argentine Football Association) River Plate
16	MF	Gimena Blanco	5 December 1987 (aged 20)			(Argentine Football Association) River Plate
17	FW	Analía Almeida	19 August 1985 (aged 22)			(Argentine Football Association) San Lorenzo de Almagro
18	GK	Vanina Correa	14 August 1983 (aged 24)			(Argentine Football Association) Boca Juniors

Pos	Team	Pld	W	D	L	GF	GA	GD	Pts	Qualification
1	China	3	2	1	0	5	2	+3	7	Qualified for the quarterfinals
2	Sweden	3	2	0	1	4	3	+1	6	Qualified for the quarterfinals
3	Canada	3	1	1	1	4	4	0	4	Qualified for the quarterfinals
4	Argentina	3	0	0	3	1	5	−4	0	

== Judo ==
Men

Athlete	Event	Preliminary	Round of 32	Round of 16	Quarterfinals	Semifinals	Repechage 1	Repechage 2	Repechage 3	Final / BM	
Athlete	Event	Opposition Result	Opposition Result	Opposition Result	Opposition Result	Opposition Result	Opposition Result	Opposition Result	Opposition Result	Opposition Result	Rank
Miguel Albarracín	−60 kg	Bye	Choi M-H (KOR); L 0000–1000	Did not advance			Akhondzadeh (IRI); L 0002–0020	Did not advance			
Mariano Bertolotti	−73 kg	—N/a	Guilheiro (BRA); L 0010–0100	Did not advance							
Emmanuel Lucenti	−81 kg	Bye	Burton (GBR); L 0010–0010	Did not advance							
Diego Rosati	−90 kg	—N/a	Olson (USA); W 0001–0000	Pershin (RUS); L 0000–1000	Did not advance		Trezise (RSA); W 1000–0000	Kazusionak (BLR); L 0000–1000	Did not advance		
Eduardo Costa	−100 kg	—N/a	Palkovacs (SVK); W 0110–0100	Matyjaszek (POL); L 0000–1001	Did not advance						
Sandro López	+100 kg	Bye	Zegarra (PER); L 0001–1001	Did not advance							

Women

Athlete	Event	Round of 32	Round of 16	Quarterfinals	Semifinals	Repechage 1	Repechage 2	Repechage 3	Final / BM	
Athlete	Event	Opposition Result	Opposition Result	Opposition Result	Opposition Result	Opposition Result	Opposition Result	Opposition Result	Opposition Result	Rank
Paula Pareto	−48 kg	Bye	Day (AUS); W 1000–0000	Tani (JPN); L 0000–0001	Did not advance	Bye	Wu Sg (CHN); W 0100–0001	Csernoviczki (HUN); W 0110–0001	Pak O-S (PRK); W 0100–0001	3rd place, bronze medalist(s)
Daniela Krukower	−63 kg	Arlove (AUS); W 1000–0000	Won O-I (PRK); L 0010–0020	Did not advance		Bye	Willeboordse (NED); L 0000–0230	Did not advance		
Lorena Briceño	−78 kg	Bye	Possamaï (FRA); L 0000–0001	Did not advance						

== Rowing ==
Men

Athlete	Event	Heats		Quarterfinals		Semifinals		Final	
Athlete	Event	Time	Rank	Time	Rank	Time	Rank	Time	Rank
Santiago Fernández	Single sculls	7:38.87	4 QF	7:27.60	6 SC/D	Withdrew			

Women

Athlete	Event	Heats		Quarterfinals		Semifinals		Final	
Athlete	Event	Time	Rank	Time	Rank	Time	Rank	Time	Rank
María Gabriela Best	Single sculls	7:58.60	4 QF	7:46.45	5 SC/D	8:09.61	3 FC	7:45.21	16

Qualification Legend: FA=Final A (medal); FB=Final B (non-medal); FC=Final C (non-medal); FD=Final D (non-medal); FE=Final E (non-medal); FF=Final F (non-medal); SA/B=Semifinals A/B; SC/D=Semifinals C/D; SE/F=Semifinals E/F; QF=Quarterfinals; R=Repechage

== Sailing ==
Men

Athlete	Event	Race											Net points	Final rank
Athlete	Event	1	2	3	4	5	6	7	8	9	10	M*	Net points	Final rank
Mariano Reutemann	RS:X	~~25~~	18	19	23	25	15	16	16	16	20	EL	168	21
Julio Alsogaray	Laser	1	12	10	28	14	1	2	~~32~~	16	CAN	8	92	7
Javier Conte; Juan de la Fuente	470	14	14	4	11	19	9	7	~~30~~	5	9	18	110	10

Women

Athlete	Event	Race											Net points	Final rank
Athlete	Event	1	2	3	4	5	6	7	8	9	10	M*	Net points	Final rank
Florencia Gutiérrez	RS:X	27	19	27	20	23	26	23	~~DNF~~	24	27	EL	216	25
Cecilia Carranza	Laser Radial	15	8	9	20	8	15	6	~~DNF~~	23	CAN	EL	104	12t
Consuelo Monsegur; Maria Fernanda Sesto	470	16	~~18~~	17	12	10	16	14	4	10	14	EL	113	16

Open

Athlete	Event	Race											Net points	Final rank
Athlete	Event	1	2	3	4	5	6	7	8	9	10	M*	Net points	Final rank
Carlos Espínola; Santiago Lange	Tornado	~~13~~	1	1	12	4	6	9	1	9	1	6	56	3rd place, bronze medalist(s)

M = Medal race; EL = Eliminated – did not advance into the medal race; CAN = Race cancelled;

== Shooting ==
Men

Athlete	Event	Qualification		Final	
Athlete	Event	Points	Rank	Points	Rank
Juan Carlos Dasque	Trap	115	19	Did not advance	

== Swimming ==
Men

Athlete	Event	Heat		Semifinal		Final	
Athlete	Event	Time	Rank	Time	Rank	Time	Rank
Damián Blaum	10 km open water	—N/a				1:55:48.6	24
Sergio Ferreyra	100 m breaststroke	1:03.65	52	Did not advance			
Sergio Ferreyra	200 m breaststroke	2:20.10	52	Did not advance			
Andrés José González	200 m butterfly	2:00.36	33	Did not advance			
José Meolans	50 m freestyle	22.58	35	Did not advance			
José Meolans	100 m freestyle	49.50	35	Did not advance			
Eduardo Germán Otero	100 m backstroke	56.74	40	Did not advance			
Juan Martín Pereyra	400 m freestyle	3:59.35	35	—N/a		Did not advance	
Juan Martín Pereyra	1500 m freestyle	15:49.57	34	—N/a		Did not advance	

Women

Athlete	Event	Heat		Semifinal		Final	
Athlete	Event	Time	Rank	Time	Rank	Time	Rank
Georgina Bardach	200 m butterfly	DNS		Did not advance			
Georgina Bardach	200 m individual medley	2:25.74	37	Did not advance			
Georgina Bardach	400 m individual medley	5:00.87	36	—N/a		Did not advance	
Cecilia Biagioli	400 m freestyle	4:19.85	34	—N/a		Did not advance	
Cecilia Biagioli	800 m freestyle	8:50.18	31	—N/a		Did not advance	
Antonella Bogarín	10 km open water	—N/a				2:11:35.9	24
Agustina de Giovanni	200 m breaststroke	2:34.94	37	Did not advance			
Liliana Guiscardo	100 m breaststroke	1:11.43	37	Did not advance			

== Table tennis ==
Athlete	Event	Preliminary round	Round 1	Round 2	Round 3	Round 4	Quarterfinals	Semifinals	Final / BM	
Athlete	Event	Opposition Result	Opposition Result	Opposition Result	Opposition Result	Opposition Result	Opposition Result	Opposition Result	Opposition Result	Rank
Liu Song	Men's singles	Bye	Jang S-M (PRK); L 2–4	Did not advance						
Pablo Tabachnik	Men's singles	Lashin (EGY); L 2–4	Did not advance							

== Taekwondo ==
Athlete	Event	Round of 16	Quarterfinals	Semifinals	Repechage	Bronze Medal	Final	
Athlete	Event	Opposition Result	Opposition Result	Opposition Result	Opposition Result	Opposition Result	Opposition Result	Rank
Vanina Sánchez	Women's −67 kg	Guler (TUR); W 4–0	Sergerie (CAN); L 0–3	Did not advance	Morgan (AUS); L 2–9	Did not advance		

== Tennis ==
Men

Athlete	Event	Round of 64	Round of 32	Round of 16	Quarterfinals	Semifinals	Final / BM	
Athlete	Event	Opposition Score	Opposition Score	Opposition Score	Opposition Score	Opposition Score	Opposition Score	Rank
Agustín Calleri	Singles	Mullings (BAH); W 6–1, 6–1	Lu Y-h (TPE); L 4–6, 4–6	Did not advance				
Guillermo Cañas	Singles	Niemeyer (CAN); W 3–6, 4–2^{r}	Simon (FRA); L 5–7, 1–6	Did not advance				
Juan Mónaco	Singles	Čilić (CRO); L 4–6, 7–6^{(7–5)}, 3–6	Did not advance					
David Nalbandian	Singles	Zeng Sx (CHN); W 6–2, 6–1	Massú (CHI); W 7–6^{(7–0)}, 6–1	Monfils (FRA); L 4–6, 4–6	Did not advance			
Agustín Calleri; Juan Mónaco	Doubles	—N/a	Guccione / Hewitt (AUS); L 4–6, 6–7^{(4–7)}, 6–8	Did not advance				
Guillermo Cañas; David Nalbandian	Doubles	—N/a	Darcis / Rochus (BEL); L 7–6^{(8–6)}, 6–7^{(5–7)}, 3–6	Did not advance				

Women

Athlete	Event	Round of 64	Round of 32	Round of 16	Quarterfinals	Semifinals	Final / BM	
Athlete	Event	Opposition Score	Opposition Score	Opposition Score	Opposition Score	Opposition Score	Opposition Score	Rank
Gisela Dulko	Singles	Dellacqua (AUS); L 3–6, 4–6	Did not advance					
Gisela Dulko; Betina Jozami	Doubles	—N/a	Obziler / Pe'er (ISR); W 6–3, 6–2	Vesnina / Zvonareva (RUS); L 2–6, 3–6	Did not advance			

== Volleyball ==
=== Beach ===
The men's beach volleyball team Conde-Baracetti (Martín Conde and Mariano Baracetti) qualified to represent Argentina.

Athlete	Event	Preliminary round	Standing	Round of 16	Quarterfinals	Semifinals	Final / BM	
Athlete	Event	Opposition Score	Standing	Opposition Score	Opposition Score	Opposition Score	Opposition Score	Rank
Mariano Baracetti; Martín Conde	Men's	Pool B Heuscher – Heyer (SUI); L 0 – 2 (13–21, 17–21); Pļaviņš – Samoilovs (LAT); W 2 – 0 (23–21, 21–19); Dalhausser – Rogers (USA); L 0 – 2 (12–21, 13–21)	4	Did not advance				

== Weightlifting ==
Athlete	Event	Snatch		Clean & Jerk		Total	Rank
Athlete	Event	Result	Rank	Result	Rank	Total	Rank
Carlos Espeleta	Men's −77 kg	140	=21	170	=18	310	19
Nora Koppel	Women's −75 kg	Did not compete					

== See also ==
- Argentina at the 2008 Summer Paralympics
