= 2004 Women's Pan American Cup =

Tournament details
- Host country: Barbados
- City: Bridgetown
- Teams: 8 (from 1 confederation)
- Venue(s): Sir Garfield Sobers Sports Complex

Final positions
- Champions: Argentina (2nd title)
- Runner-up: United States
- Third place: Canada

Tournament statistics
- Matches played: 20
- Goals scored: 124 (6.2 per match)
- Top scorer(s): (Argentina) Vanina Oneto (10 goals)
- Best player: (Argentina) Luciana Aymar

The 2004 Women's Pan American Cup was the 2nd edition of the Women's Pan American Cup. It was held between 21 and 28 April 2004 in Bridgetown, Barbados. The tournament doubled as the qualifier to the 2006 World Cup to be held in Madrid, Spain. The winner would qualify directly while the runner-up would have the chance to obtain one of five berths at the World Cup Qualifier in Rome, Italy.

Argentina won the tournament for the second consecutive time after defeating the United States 3–0 in the final, earning an automatic berth at the 2006 World Cup to defend their title obtained in 2002.

== Umpires ==
Below are the 10 umpires appointed by the Pan American Hockey Federation:

- Keely Dunn (CAN)
- Soledad Iparraguirre (ARG)
- Jun Kentwell (USA)
- Ruth Limberg (BAR)
- Lisa Marcano (TRI)
- Renate Peters (GER)
- Emma Simmons (BER)
- Heather Smith (ENG)
- Alicia Takeda (MEX)
- Claudia Videla (CHI)

== Results ==
All times are Atlantic Standard Time (UTC−04:00)

=== First round ===
==== Pool A ====
Pos	Team	Pld	W	D	L	GF	GA	GD	Pts	Qualification
1	Argentina	3	3	0	0	31	1	+30	9	Semi-finals
2	Canada	3	2	0	1	11	4	+7	6	Semi-finals
3	Chile	3	1	0	2	6	13	−7	3	
4	Netherlands Antilles	3	0	0	3	0	30	−30	0	

Source: PAHF

21 April 2004
18:00

Chile	6–0	Netherlands Antilles
Villagra 9', 54'; Martín 32'; De. Infante 34'; García 60', 66'

Umpires:
Lisa Marcano (TRI)
Jun Kentwell (USA)

21 April 2004
20:00

Argentina	4–1	Canada
Aicega 16'; Aymar 38', 62'; García 62'		Timmer 65'

Umpires:
Heather Smith (ENG)
Renate Peters (GER)

22 April 2004
18:00

Canada	8–0	Netherlands Antilles
Jameson 2', 49'; McLean 9'; Rushton 12'; Taunton 23'; Leslie 30', 42'; Hume 56'

Umpires:
Alicia Takeda (MEX)
Ruth Limberg (BAR)

22 April 2004
20:00

Chile	0–11	Argentina
		García 4'; Oneto 23', 34', 43'; Gulla 25', 44', 46', 52'; Doreski 31' di Giacomo 64'; Aymar 66'

Umpires:
Renate Peters (GER)
Keely Dunn (CAN)

24 April 2004
8:30

Canada	2–0	Chile
Taunton 23'; Magnus 63'

Umpires:
Soledad Iparraguirre (ARG)
Lisa Marcano (TRI)

24 April 2004
16:00

Netherlands Antilles	0–16	Argentina
		Oneto 15', 46', 52', 60', 69'; Aicega 26'; Gulla 29'; Stepnik 35'; Doreski 37', 40', 53', 55', 68' di Giacomo 45'; Hernández 50'; Russo 65'

Umpires:
Emma Simmons (BER)
Ruth Limberg (BAR)

==== Pool B ====
Pos	Team	Pld	W	D	L	GF	GA	GD	Pts	Qualification
1	United States	3	3	0	0	18	1	+17	9	Semi-finals
2	Uruguay	3	2	0	1	6	3	+3	6	Semi-finals
3	Barbados (H)	3	0	1	2	4	14	−10	1	
4	Trinidad and Tobago	3	0	1	2	2	12	−10	1	

Source: PAHF
(H) Hosts

21 April 2004
8:30

United States	9–0	Trinidad and Tobago
McCann 9'; Lingo 14'; Fuchs 17', 52'; Loy 34', 63'; Gannon 64'; Wooley 68'; Fronzoni 69'

Umpires:
Soledad Iparraguirre (ARG)
Alicia Takeda (MEX)

21 April 2004
10:30

Barbados	1–5	Uruguay
Chrichlow 27'		Ceretta 4', 20'; Casabó 14', 50'; Margni 64'

Umpires:
Claudia Videla (CHI)
Keely Dunn (CAN)

22 April 2004
8:30

Uruguay	1–0	Trinidad and Tobago
Casabó 21'

Umpires:
Heather Smith (ENG)
Jun Kentwell (USA)

22 April 2004
16:00

United States	7–1	Barbados
McCann 4'; Loy 7'; Fuchs 9', 30'; Barber 14'; T. Smith 25'; K. Smith 43'		Greaves 57'

Umpires:
Soledad Iparraguirre (ARG)
Emma Simmons (BER)

24 April 2004
18:00

Uruguay	0–2	United States
		McCann; Fuchs 61'

Umpires:
Claudia Videla (CHI)
Renate Peters (GER)

24 April 2004
20:00

Trinidad and Tobago	2–2	Barbados
Wynne 28'; Dixon-Aming		Greaves 2'; Holder 34'

=== Fifth to eighth place classification ===
Cross-overs
25 April
Chile	4
Trinidad and Tobago	2
25 April
Netherlands Antilles	0
Barbados	3

Fifth place
27 April
Chile	5
Barbados	2
Seventh place
27 April
Trinidad and Tobago	1
Netherlands Antilles	3

==== Cross-overs ====
25 April 2004
18:00

Chile	4–2	Trinidad and Tobago
Wenz 17'; García 30'; Da. Infante 38'; P. Infante 68'		Trotman 40'; Siu Butt 53'

Umpires:
Jun Kentwell (USA)
Alicia Takeda (MEX)

25 April 2004
20:30

Netherlands Antilles	0–3	Barbados
		Brathwaite 1'; Warner 17'; Greaves 31'

Umpires:
Lisa Marcano (TRI)
Claudia Videla (CHI)

==== Seventh and eighth place ====
27 April 2004
17:30

Trinidad and Tobago	1–3	Netherlands Antilles
Dixon-Aming 13'		Mulder 17', 58'; Thies 33'

Umpires:
Ruth Limberg (BAR)
Emma Simmons (BER)

==== Fifth and sixth place ====
27 April 2004
20:00

Chile	5–2	Barbados
Da. Infante 6'; P. Infante 14', 47'; García 34', 49'		Kellman 53'; Browne 68'

Umpires:
Alicia Takeda (MEX)
Heather Smith (ENG)

=== First to fourth place classification ===
Semi-finals
26 April
Argentina	11
Uruguay	0
26 April
Canada	3
United States	4

Final
28 April
Argentina	3
United States	0
Third place
28 April
Uruguay	0
Canada	5

==== Semi-finals ====
26 April 2004
17:30

Argentina	11–0	Uruguay
Aymar 11'; Oneto 26', 52'; Hernández 28'; Arrondo 35+', 36', 41'; Doreski 58'; Russo 61'; Gulla 67'; Burkart 69'

Umpires:
Renate Peter (GER)
Keely Dunn (CAN)

26 April 2004
20:00

Canada	3–4	United States
Leslie 10'; Taunton 41'; Jameson 45'		Fronzoni 24'; McCann 31'; Fuchs 35', 38'

Umpires:
Soledad Iparraguirre (ARG)
Claudia Videla (CHI)

==== Third and fourth place ====
28 April 2004
16:30

Uruguay	0–5	Canada
	Report	Hume 19'; Rezansoff 28'; Cuthbert 31', 34'; Magnus 56'

Umpires:
Soledad Iparraguire (ARG)
Jun Ketwell (USA)

==== Final ====
28 April 2004
19:00

Argentina	3–0	United States
García 37', 46'; Gulla 48'	Report

Umpires:
Renate Peters (GER)
Claudia Videla (CHI)

Team details

Argentina
United States

GK	18	Paola Vukojicic
DF	6	Ayelén Stepnik
DF	3	Magdalena Aicega (c)
DF	14	Mercedes Margalot
DF	24	Claudia Burkart
MF	4	María Paz Ferrari
MF	12	Mariana González Oliva
MF	8	Luciana Aymar
FW	7	Alejandra Gulla
FW	10	Soledad García
FW	21	Inés Arrondo
Substitutions:
FW	9	Vanina Oneto	(substituted in) 15'
FW	15	María Paz Hernández	(substituted in) 26'
MF	19	Mariné Russo	(substituted in) 20'
FW	23	Natalí Doreski	(substituted in) 22'
DF	28	Macarena Rodríguez	(substituted in) 54'
Coach:
(Argentina) Sergio Vigil

GK	25	Amy Swensen
DF	2	Angie Loy
DF	5	Tara Jelley
DF	24	Dina Rizzo
MF	3	Kristen McCann
MF	7	Tracey Larson
MF	9	Tracey Fuchs
MF	11	Katie Kauffman (c)
MF	17	Carrie Lingo
FW	22	Kate Barber
FW	13	Kelly Smith
Substitutions:
	14	Abbey Wooley	(substituted in) 61'
FW	21	April Fronzoni	(substituted in) 43'
MF	23	Meredith Keller	(substituted in) 43'
DF	26	Kristi Gannon	(substituted in) 64'
Coach:
(United States) Beth Anders

== Statistics ==
=== Final standings ===
1. Argentina
2. United States
3. Canada
4. Uruguay
5. Chile
6. Barbados
7. Netherlands Antilles
8. Trinidad and Tobago

=== Awards ===
Top Goalscorer	Player of the Tournament	Goalkeeper of the Tournament
(Argentina) Vanina Oneto	(Argentina) Luciana Aymar	(Netherlands Antilles) Charlotte Hartmans van de Rijdt

=== Goalscorers ===
10 goals

- (Argentina) Vanina Oneto

7 goals

- (Argentina) Natalí Doreski
- (Argentina) Alejandra Gulla
- (United States) Tracey Fuchs

5 goals

- (Chile) Carolina García

4 goals

- (Argentina) Luciana Aymar
- (Argentina) Soledad García
- (United States) Kristen McCann

3 goals

- (Argentina) Inés Arrondo
- (Barbados) Tricia-Ann Greaves
- (Canada) Stephanie Jameson
- (Canada) Robyn Leslie
- (Canada) Kristen Taunton
- (Chile) Daniela Infante
- (Chile) Paula Infante
- (United States) Angela Loy
- (Uruguay) Virginia Casabó

2 goals

- (Netherlands Antilles) Daphne Mulder
- (Argentina) Magdalena Aicega
- (Argentina) Marina di Giacomo
- (Argentina) María de la Paz Hernández
- (Argentina) Mariné Russo
- (Canada) Deb Cuthbert
- (Canada) Stephanie Hume
- (Canada) Lesley Magnus
- (Chile) Javiera Villagra
- (United States) April Fronzoni
- (Trinidad and Tobago) Nicole Dixon-Aming
- (Uruguay) Bettiana Ceretta

1 goal

- (Netherlands Antilles) Maaika Thies
- (Argentina) Claudia Burkart
- (Argentina) Ayelén Stepnik
- (Barbados) Patrina Brathwaite
- (Barbados) Maria Browne
- (Barbados) Lisa Chrichlow
- (Barbados) Deborah Holder
- (Barbados) Corlette Kellman
- (Barbados) Charlia Warner
- (Canada) Lauren McLean
- (Canada) Kelly Rezansoff
- (Canada) Andrea Rushton
- (Canada) Kristal Timmer
- (Chile) Valentina Martín
- (Chile) Sandra Wenz
- (United States) Kate Barber
- (United States) Kristi Gannon
- (United States) Carrie Lingo
- (United States) Keli Smith
- (United States) Tamika Smith
- (United States) Abbey Wooley
- (Canada) Lauren McLean
- (Trinidad and Tobago) Stacey Siu Butt
- (Trinidad and Tobago) Oire Trotman
- (Trinidad and Tobago) Blair Wynne
- (Uruguay) Lorena Margni

== See also ==
- 2004 Men's Pan American Cup
