= 2009 Women's Hockey Champions Trophy =

Tournament details
- Host country: Australia
- City: Sydney
- Teams: 6
- Venue: Sydney Olympic Park Hockey Centre

Final positions
- Champions: Argentina (3rd title)
- Runner-up: Australia
- Third place: Netherlands

Tournament statistics
- Matches played: 18
- Goals scored: 59 (3.28 per match)
- Top scorer: (Netherlands) Maartje Paumen (5 goals)
- Best player: (Australia) Madonna Blyth

The 2009 Women's Hockey Champions Trophy was the 17th edition of the Hockey Champions Trophy for women. It was held between 11 and 19 July 2009 in Sydney, Australia.

Argentina won the tournament for the third time after defeating Australia 4–3 in the final on penalty strokes after a 0–0 draw.

Despite finishing runner-up, Australia were relegated from next year's tournament instead of the sixth-placed team England, due to England being the host of the 2010 edition. Relegation was decided based on rankings from the 2008 Olympics. Australian coach Frank Murray strongly criticised the rule, calling it "a ridiculous qualification process", upon discovering prior to the final that Australia would have to win the tournament to avoid relegation. He stated that the tournament's lowest-placed team bar the next hosts should instead be relegated, and noted that the rule incentivised Australia to deliberately lose to England, to help England to finish higher than sixth.

== Teams ==
The International Hockey Federation announced the qualified teams for this event:

- Argentina (Defending champions)
- Netherlands (Champions of 2008 Summer Olympics and champions of 2006 World Cup)
- Australia (Host nation)
- China (Second in 2008 Olympics)
- Germany (Fourth 2008 Olympics)
- England (Sixth in 2008 Olympics as Great Britain)

== Umpires ==
Below are the 8 umpires appointed by the International Hockey Federation:

- Julie Ashton-Lucy (AUS)
- Marelize de Klerk (RSA)
- Christiane Hippler (GER)
- Lee Keum-ju (KOR)
- Lisette Klaassen (NED)
- Miao Lin (CHN)
- Lisa Roach (AUS)
- Wendy Stewart (CAN)

== Results ==
All times are Eastern Standard Time (UTC+10:00)

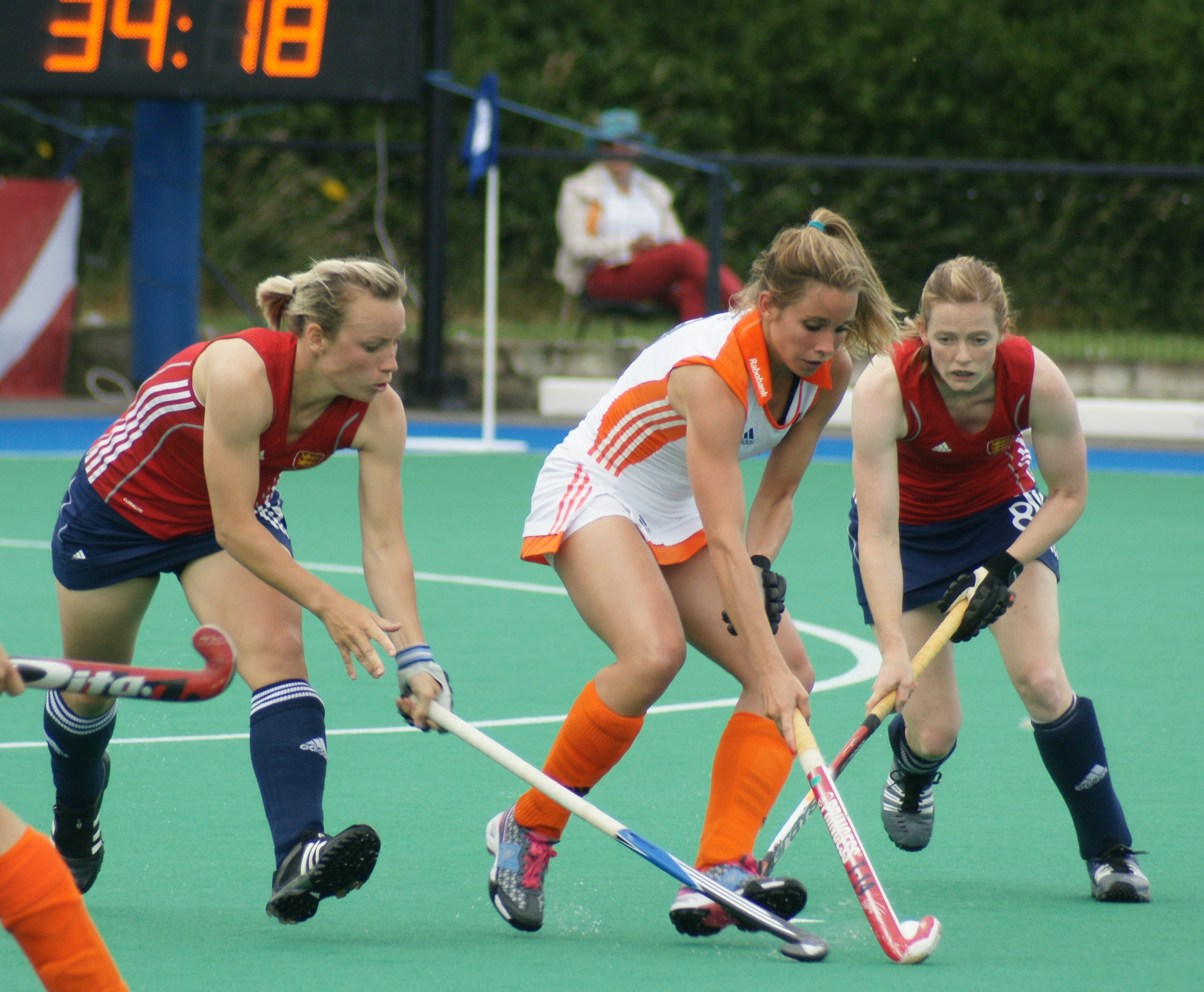
Dutch player Ellen Hoog shielding the ball during Netherlands-England match on 11 July 2009.

=== Pool ===
| Pos | Team | Pld | W | D | L | GF | GA | GD | Pts | Qualification |
|---|---|---|---|---|---|---|---|---|---|---|
| 1 | Argentina | 5 | 3 | 2 | 0 | 8 | 4 | +4 | 11 | Final |
| 2 | Australia | 5 | 3 | 1 | 1 | 10 | 4 | +6 | 10 | Final |
| 3 | Netherlands | 5 | 2 | 2 | 1 | 7 | 6 | +1 | 8 | |
| 4 | Germany | 5 | 2 | 1 | 2 | 6 | 6 | 0 | 7 | |
| 5 | China | 5 | 1 | 1 | 3 | 9 | 9 | 0 | 4 | |
| 6 | England | 5 | 0 | 1 | 4 | 5 | 16 | −11 | 1 | |

Source: FIH
Rules for classification: 1) points; 2) goal difference; 3) goals scored; 4) head-to-head result.

11 July 2009
11:05

| Netherlands | 2–2 | England |
|---|---|---|
| Agliotti 59'; Paumen 70+' | Report | Long 15'; Danson 47' |

Umpires:
Miao Lin (CHN)
Christiane Hippler (GER)

11 July 2009
13:05

| Germany | 0–2 | Australia |
|---|---|---|
| | Report | Hurtz 36'; Blyth 43' |

Umpires:
Lee Keum-ju (KOR)
Wendy Stewart (CAN)

11 July 2009
15:05

| Argentina | 2–1 | China |
|---|---|---|
| Garcia 45'; Barrionuevo 67' | Report | Ma Y. 57' |

Umpires:
Lisa Roach (AUS)
Lisette Klaassen (NED)

12 July 2009
11:05

| England | 1–3 | Germany |
|---|---|---|
| Rogers 2' | Report | Beermann 25'; Rinne 37'; Stöckel 43' |

Umpires:
Wendy Stewart (CAN)
Lisette Klaassen (NED)

12 July 2009
13:05

| Australia | 0–1 | Argentina |
|---|---|---|
| | Report | J. Sruoga 35' |

Umpires:
Marelize de Klerk (RSA)
Miao Lin (CHN)

12 July 2009
15:05

| China | 0–1 | Netherlands |
|---|---|---|
| | Report | Agliotti 61' |

Umpires:
Julie Ashton-Lucy (AUS)
Lee Keum-ju (KOR)

14 July 2009
18:05

| Germany | 0–1 | Netherlands |
|---|---|---|
| | Report | Schopman 49' |

Umpires:
Julie Ashton-Lucy (AUS)
Lisa Roach (AUS)

14 July 2009
20:05

| Australia | 2–2 | China |
|---|---|---|
| Nelson 45'; Eastham 57' | Report | Song 50'; Liao 65' |

Umpires:
Wendy Stewart (CAN)
Christiane Hippler (GER)

15 July 2009
18:05

| China | 2–3 | Germany |
|---|---|---|
| Fu 15'; Ma Y. 60' | Report | Otte 24', 66'; Müller 64' |

Umpires:
Marelize de Klerk (RSA)
Lisette Klaassen (NED)

15 July 2009
20:05

| Argentina | 3–1 | England |
|---|---|---|
| Garcia 19'; Rebecchi 30'; Barrionuevo 51' | Report | Herbert 6' |

Umpires:
Julie Ashton-Lucy (AUS)
Lee Keum-ju (KOR)

16 July 2009
18:05

| Netherlands | 2–2 | Argentina |
|---|---|---|
| Lammers 49'; Paumen 54' | Report | Barrionuevo 43', 64' |

Umpires:
Lisa Roach (AUS)
Marelize de Klerk (RSA)

16 July 2009
20:05

| England | 0–4 | Australia |
|---|---|---|
| | Report | Arrold 13', 38'; Eastham 25'; Munro 55' |

Umpires:
Miao Lin (CHN)
Christiane Hippler (GER)

18 July 2009
11:05

| China | 4–1 | England |
|---|---|---|
| Ma Y. 23'; Fu 40'; Song 52'; Zhao 56' | Report | Herbert 44' |

Umpires:
Julie Ashton-Lucy (AUS)
Lisette Klaassen (NED)

18 July 2009
13:05

| Australia | 2–1 | Netherlands |
|---|---|---|
| Eastham 2'; Arrold 43' | Report | Paumen 9' |

Umpires:
Marelize de Klerk (RSA)
Lee Keum-ju (KOR)

18 July 2009
15:05

| Argentina | 0–0 | Germany |
|---|---|---|
| | Report |

Umpires:
Lisa Roach (AUS)
Miao Lin (CHN)

=== Classification ===
==== Fifth and sixth place ====
19 July 2009
10:05

| China | 7–0 | England |
|---|---|---|
| Li H. 3'; Ren 27', 31'; Song 37'; Fu 52', 53'; Xing 58' | Report |

Umpires:
Christiane Hippler (GER)
Wendy Stewart (CAN)

==== Third and fourth place ====
19 July 2009
12:35

| Netherlands | 5–2 | Germany |
|---|---|---|
| Hoog 9'; Paumen 14', 29'; Agliotti 21', 25' | Report | Hoffmann 27'; Keller 34' |

Umpires:
Julie Ashton-Lucy (AUS)
Lisa Roach (AUS)

==== Final ====
19 July 2009
15:05

| Argentina | 0–0 (a.e.t.) | Australia |
|---|---|---|
| | Report |
Penalties
| Barrionuevo (penalty shoot-out scored); Burkart (penalty shoot-out missed); Rebecchi (penalty shoot-out scored); D'Elia (penalty shoot-out scored); Aymar (penalty shoot-out scored) | 4–3 | (penalty shoot-out missed) Arrold; (penalty shoot-out scored) Eastham; (penalty shoot-out scored) Blyth; (penalty shoot-out scored) Hurtz; (penalty shoot-out missed) Boyce |

Umpires:
Marelize de Klerk (RSA)
Miao Lin (CHN)

Team details

Argentina
Australia

| GK | 1 | Belén Succi |
| DF | 24 | Claudia Burkart |
| DF | 25 | Silvina D'Elía | 8' |
| DF | 26 | Giselle Kañevsky | 63' |
| DF | 27 | Noel Barrionuevo |
| MF | 4 | Rosario Luchetti |
| MF | 19 | Mariné Russo |
| MF | 8 | Luciana Aymar |
| MF | 21 | Mariela Scarone |
| FW | 10 | Soledad García |
| FW | 11 | Carla Rebecchi |
Substitutions:
| FW | 7 | Alejandra Gulla | | (substituted on) 15' |
| MF | 18 | Daniela Sruoga | | (substituted on) 9' |
| | 30 | Josefina Sruoga | | (substituted on) 12' |
Manager:
(Argentina) Carlos Retegui

| GK | 1 | Toni Cronk |
| DF | 3 | Sarah O'Conner |
| DF | 5 | Alison Bruce |
| MF | 4 | Casey Eastham |
| MF | 6 | Megan Rivers |
| MF | 10 | Kate Hollywood |
| MF | 28 | Hope Munro |
| MF | 14 | Nicole Arrold |
| MF | 16 | Fiona Johnson |
| FW | 17 | Emily Hurtz |
| FW | 12 | Madonna Blyth |
Substitutions:
| MF | 2 | Georgia Nanscawen | (substituted on) 6' |
| FW | 8 | Ashleigh Nelson | (substituted on) 7' |
| | 22 | Airlie Ogilvie | (substituted on) 9' |
| | 24 | Fiona Boyce | (substituted on) 8' |
Manager:
(Australia) Frank Murray

== Awards ==
| Player of the Tournament | Top Goalscorer | Goalkeeper of the Tournament | Fair Play Trophy |
|---|---|---|---|
| (Australia) Madonna Blyth | (Netherlands) Maartje Paumen | (Argentina) Belén Succi | Australia |

== Statistics ==
=== Final standings ===
1. Argentina
2. Australia
3. Netherlands
4. Germany
5. China
6. England

=== Goalscorers ===
There were 59 goals scored in 18 matches, for an average of 3.28 goals per match.

5 goals

- (Netherlands) Maartje Paumen

4 goals

- (Argentina) Noel Barrionuevo
- (China) Fu Baorong
- (Netherlands) Marilyn Agliotti

3 goals

- (Australia) Nicole Arrold
- (Australia) Casey Eastham
- (China) Ma Yibo
- (China) Song Qingling

2 goals

- (Argentina) Soledad García
- (China) Ren Ye
- (England) Rebecca Herbert
- (Germany) Katharina Otte

1 goal

- (Argentina) Carla Rebecchi
- (Argentina) Josefina Sruoga
- (Australia) Madonna Blyth
- (Australia) Emily Hurtz
- (Australia) Hope Munro
- (Australia) Ashleigh Nelson
- (China) Li Hongxia
- (China) Liao Jiahui
- (China) Xing Qian
- (China) Zhao Yudiao
- (England) Alex Danson
- (England) Katie Long
- (England) Chloe Rogers
- (Germany) Janine Beermann
- (Germany) Eileen Hoffmann
- (Germany) Natascha Keller
- (Germany) Julia Müller
- (Germany) Fanny Rinne
- (Germany) Maike Stöckel
- (Netherlands) Ellen Hoog
- (Netherlands) Kim Lammers
- (Netherlands) Janneke Schopman

Source: FIH
