= Calello =

Calello is a surname. Notable people with the surname include:

- Adrián Calello (born 1987), Argentine footballer
- Carola Calello (born 1977), Argentine alpine skier
- Charles Calello (born 1938), American singer, composer, conductor, arranger, and record producer
- Guadalupe Calello (born 1990), Argentine footballer
- Paul Calello (1961–2010), American chief executive
