= Field hockey at the 2008 Summer Olympics – Women's tournament =

Women's field hockey at the 2008 Summer Olympics
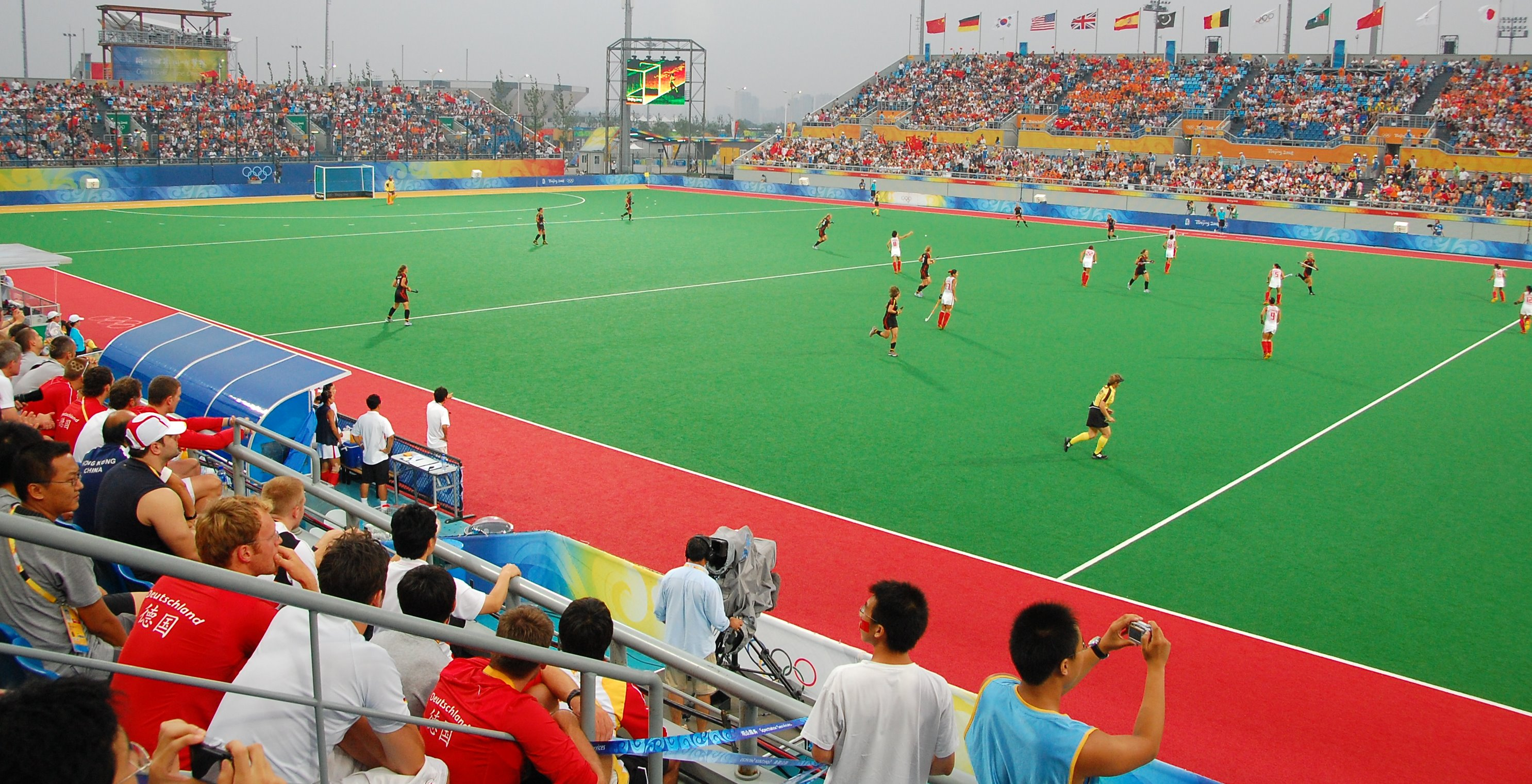
- Olympic Green Hockey Field

Tournament details
- Host country: China
- City: Beijing
- Dates: 10 – 22 August
- Teams: 12
- Venue: Olympic Green Hockey Field

Final positions
- Champions: Netherlands (2nd title)
- Runner-up: China
- Third place: Argentina

Tournament statistics
- Matches played: 38
- Goals scored: 149 (3.92 per match)
- Top scorer: (Netherlands) Maartje Paumen (11 goals)

The women's field hockey tournament at the 2008 Summer Olympics was the 8th edition of the field hockey event for women at the Summer Olympic Games. It was held over a thirteen-day period beginning on 10 August, and culminating with the medal finals on 22 August. All games were played at the hockey field constructed on the Olympic Green in Beijing, China.

The Netherlands won the gold medal for the second time after defeating the hosts China 2–0 in the final. Argentina won the bronze medal by defeating the defending champions Germany 3–1.

== Competition format ==
The twelve teams in the tournament were divided into two pools of six, with each team initially playing round-robin games within its respective pool. Following the completion of the round-robin, the top two teams from each pool advanced to the semifinals. All other teams played classification matches to determine the final tournament rankings. The two semi-final winners met for the gold medal match, while the semi-final losers played in the bronze medal match.

== Qualification ==
Each of the continental champions from five federations and the hosts China received an automatic berth. The European federation received two extra quotas, while Oceanian received one extra quota, based upon the FIH World Rankings at the completion of the 2006 World Cup. In addition to the three teams qualifying through the Olympic Qualifying Tournaments, the following twelve teams, shown with final pre-tournament rankings, competed in this tournament.

Dates	Event	Location	Quotas	Qualifier(s)
Host nation			1	China (5)
2–14 December 2006	2006 Asian Games	Doha, Qatar	1	Japan^{1} (6)
14–22 July 2007	2007 African Olympic Qualifier	Nairobi, Kenya	1	South Africa (12)
14–29 July 2007	2007 Pan American Games	Rio de Janeiro, Brazil	1	Argentina (2)
18–25 August 2007	2007 EuroHockey Nations Championship	Manchester, England	3	Germany (3); Netherlands (1); Great Britain (10)
10–17 September 2007	2007 Oceania Cup	Buderim, Australia	2	New Zealand (7); Australia (4)
12–20 April 2008	Olympic Qualifying Tournament 1	Baku, Azerbaijan	1	Spain (8)
19–27 April 2008	Olympic Qualifying Tournament 2	Kazan, Russia	1	United States (11)
26 April – 4 May 2008	Olympic Qualifying Tournament 3	Victoria, Canada	1	South Korea (9)
Total			8	

^1 – China qualified both as host and continental champion, therefore that quota was given to the Asian federation allowing Japan to qualify directly to the 2008 Summer Olympics as the second-placed team at the 2006 Asian Games.

== Umpires ==
Fifteen umpires for the women's event were appointed by the FIH. During each match, a video umpire was used to assist the on-field umpires in determining if a goal had been legally scored.

- Julie Ashton-Lucy (AUS)
- Stella Bartlema (NED)
- Ute Conen (GER)
- Marelize de Klerk (RSA)
- Carolina de la Fuente (ARG)
- Sarah Garnett (NZL)
- Soledad Iparraguirre (ARG)
- Lee Keum-ju (KOR)
- Anne McRae (GBR)
- Carol Metchette (IRL)
- Miao Lin (CHN)
- Lisa Roach (AUS)
- Chieko Soma (JPN)
- Gina Spitaleri (ITA)
- Minka Woolley (AUS)

== Results ==
All times are China Standard Time (UTC+08:00)

=== First round ===
==== Pool A ====
Team	Pld	W	D	L	GF	GA	GD	Pts	Qualification
Netherlands	5	5	0	0	14	3	+11	15	Advanced to semifinals
China	5	3	1	1	14	4	+10	10	Advanced to semifinals
Australia	5	3	1	1	17	9	+8	10	
Spain	5	2	0	3	4	12	−8	6	
South Korea	5	1	0	4	13	18	−5	3	
South Africa	5	0	0	5	2	18	−16	0	

10 August 2008
10:30

China	3–0	Spain
Fu Baorong 17'; Li Hongxia 31'; Gao Lihua 37'	Report

Umpires:
Ute Conen (GER)
Marelize de Clerk (RSA)

10 August 2008
18:00

Australia	5–4	South Korea
Liddelow 25', 50'; Hudson 47'; Young 56'; Eastham 65'	Report	Kim Mi-sun 18'; Kim Da-rae 27'; Gim Sung-hee 32'; Park Mi-hyun 34'

Umpires:
Soledad Iparruguirre (ARG)
Stella Bartlema (NED)

10 August 2008
20:30

Netherlands	6–0	South Africa
Mulder 5'; Agliotti 27'; Paumen 46', 58'; Booij 56'; Dijkstra 66'	Report

Umpires:
Lisa Roach (AUS)
Carolina de la Fuente (ARG)

12 August 2008
10:30

Australia	6–1	Spain
Lambert 27', 60'; Hudson 47'; Eastham 54'; Halliday 66'; Rivers 70'	Report	Muñoz 6'

Umpires:
Chieko Soma (JPN)
Miao Lin (CHN)

12 August 2008
18:30

China	3–0	South Africa
Tang Chunling 6'; Fu Baorong 33'; Zhao Yudiao 40'	Report

Umpires:
Gina Spitaleri (ITA)
Minka Woolley (AUS)

12 August 2008
20:30

Netherlands	3–2	South Korea
Paumen 3', 55'; Schopman 7'	Report	Lee Seon-ok 4', 39'

Umpires:
Julie Ashton-Lucy (AUS)
Ute Conen (GER)

14 August 2008
08:30

China	0–1	Netherlands
	Report	Paumen 21'

Umpires:
Chieko Soma (JPN)
Soledad Iparruguirre (ARG)

14 August 2008
18:00

Spain	2–1	South Korea
Camón 8'; Sanchez 22'	Report	Kim Jong-eun 37'

Umpires:
Anne McRae (GBR)
Sarah Garnett (NZL)

14 August 2008
20:30

South Africa	0–3	Australia
	Report	Hudson 10'; Lambert 44'; Eastham 62'

Umpires:
Carol Metchette (IRL)
Ute Conen (GER)

16 August 2008
10:30

Australia	1–2	Netherlands
Young 17'	Report	Paumen 20', 46'

Umpires:
Sarah Garnett (NZL)
Marelize de Klerk (RSA)

16 August 2008
18:30

South Korea	1–6	China
Lee Seon-ok 53'	Report	Tang Chunling 30', 33', 41'; Fu Baorong 39', 40', 64'

Umpires:
Julie Ashton-Lucy (AUS)
Carolina de la Fuente (ARG)

16 August 2008
21:00

Spain	1–0	South Africa
Romagosa 31'	Report

Umpires:
Lee Keum-ju (KOR)
Gina Spitaleri (ITA)

18 August 2008
10:30

South Korea	5–2	South Africa
Gim Sung-hee 6'; Lee Seon-ok 23', 29'; Park Mi-hyun 32'; Kim Eun-sil 58'	Report	Hector 51'; Vida Ryan 66'

Umpires:
Stella Bartlema (NED)
Carol Metchette (IRL)

18 August 2008
18:30

Netherlands	2–0	Spain
Paumen 22'; Hoog 69'	Report

Umpires:
Soledad Iparraguirre (ARG)
Minka Woolley (AUS)

18 August 2008
21:00

China	2–2	Australia
Li Hongxia 30', 38'	Report	Eastham 51'; Young 62'

Umpires:
Chieko Soma (JPN)
Carolina de la Fuente (ARG)

==== Pool B ====
Team	Pld	W	D	L	GF	GA	GD	Pts	Qualification
Germany	5	4	0	1	12	8	+4	12	Advanced to semifinals
Argentina	5	3	2	0	13	7	+6	11	Advanced to semifinals
Great Britain	5	2	2	1	7	9	−2	8	
United States	5	1	3	1	9	8	+1	6	
Japan	5	1	1	3	5	7	−2	4	
New Zealand	5	0	0	5	6	13	−7	0	

10 August 2008
08:30

Japan	2–1	New Zealand
Morimoto 12'; Tsukui 17'	Report	Claxton 25'

Umpires:
Lee Keum-ju (KOR)
Minka Woolley (AUS)

10 August 2008
18:30

Argentina	2–2	United States
Rebecchi 5', 11'	Report	Smith 18'; Loy 64'

Umpires:
Julie Ashton-Lucy (AUS)
Carol Metchette (IRL)

10 August 2008
21:00

Germany	5–1	Great Britain
Rinne 26', 52'; Hoffmann 31', 49'; Rodewald 60'	Report	Cullen 29'

Umpires:
Sarah Garnett (NZL)
Miao Lin (CHN)

12 August 2008
08:30

Argentina	2–2	Great Britain
García 10'; Gulla 27'	Report	Thomas 49'; Clewlow 51'

Umpires:
Marelize de Klerk (RSA)
Stella Bartlema (NED)

12 August 2008
18:00

United States	1–1	Japan
Barber 58'	Report	Chiba 12'

Umpires:
Sarah Garnett (NZL)
Lisa Roach (AUS)

12 August 2008
21:00

Germany	2–1	New Zealand
Scholz 59'; Kühn 69'	Report	Forgesson 31'

Umpires:
Anne McRae (GBR)
Soledad Iparruguirre (ARG)

14 August 2008
10:30

United States	2–4	Germany
Snow 27'; Loy 60'	Report	Keller 34'; Rinne 49'; Rodewald 55'; Kühn 64'

Umpires:
Lee Keum-ju (KOR)
Marelize de Klerk (RSA)

14 August 2008
18:30

Japan	1–2	Argentina
Miura 64'	Report	Gulla 38'; Burkart 51'

Umpires:
Miao Lin (CHN)
Gina Spitaleri (ITA)

14 August 2008
21:00

New Zealand	1–2	Great Britain
Flynn 28'	Report	Danson 31'; Cullen 50'

Umpires:
Julie Ashton-Lucy (AUS)
Carolina de la Fuente (ARG)

16 August 2008
08:30

New Zealand	1–4	United States
Galletly 37'	Report	Smith 1', 42'; Loy 12'; Bashore 47'

Umpires:
Stella Bartlema (NED)
Anne McRae (GBR)

16 August 2008
18:00

Germany	0–4	Argentina
	Report	Burkart 38'; Gulla 49', 66'; Aymar 68'

Umpires:
Lisa Roach (AUS)
Chieko Soma (JPN)

16 August 2008
20:30

Great Britain	2–1	Japan
Panter 32'; Cullen 70'	Report	Miura 58'

Umpires:
Minka Woolley (AUS)
Carol Metchette (IRL)

18 August 2008
08:30

Germany	1–0	Japan
Beermann 40'	Report

Umpires:
Julie Ashton-Lucy (AUS)
Miao Lin (CHN)

18 August 2008
18:00

Great Britain	0–0	United States
	Report

Umpires:
Ute Conen (GER)
Lisa Roach (AUS)

18 August 2008
20:30

Argentina	3–2	New Zealand
Rebecchi 15'; García 43'; Hernández 46'	Report	Roberts 33'; Igasan 61'

Umpires:
Gina Spitaleri (ITA)
Marelize de Klerk (RSA)

=== Fifth to twelfth place classification ===
==== Eleventh and twelfth place ====
22 August 2008
08:30

South Africa	4–1	New Zealand
Marescia 14'; Wilson 34'; Vida Ryan 51'; Brown 59'	Report	Flynn 17'

Umpires:
Lee Keum-ju (KOR)
Carol Metchette (IRL)

==== Ninth and tenth place ====
20 August 2008
08:30

South Korea	2–1	Japan
Park Jeong-sook 12', 49'	Report	Komazawa 43'

Umpires:
Gina Spitaleri (ITA)
Lisa Roach (AUS)

==== Seventh and eighth place ====
20 August 2008
11:00

Spain	3–2 (a.e.t.)	United States
Termens 8'; Huertas 68'; Ybarra 84'	Report	Sensenig 30'; Loy 59'

Umpires:
Minka Woolley (AUS)
Ute Conen (GER)

==== Fifth and sixth place ====
22 August 2008
11:00

Australia	2–0	Great Britain
Blyth 29'; Munro 68'	Report

Umpires:
Sarah Garnett (NZL)
Miao Lin (CHN)

=== Medal round ===
Semi-finals
20 August
Germany	2
China	3
20 August
Netherlands	5
Argentina	2

Gold medal match
22 August
China	0
Netherlands	2
Bronze medal match
22 August
Germany	1
Argentina	3

==== Semi-finals ====
20 August 2008
18:00

Germany	2–3	China
Keller 4'; Beermann 36'	Report	Gao Lihua 31'; Ma Yibo 39'; Zhao Yudiao 58'

Umpires:
Carolina de la Fuente (ARG)
Julie Ashton-Lucy (AUS)

20 August 2008
20:30

Netherlands	5–2	Argentina
Paumen 9', 25', 47'; Agliotti 31'; Hoog 68'	Report	Russo 59'; Gulla 69'

Umpires:
Marelize de Klerk (RSA)
Sarah Garnett (NZL)

==== Bronze medal match ====
22 August 2008
18:00

Germany	1–3	Argentina (bronze)
Kühn 45'	Report	Luchetti 11'; Rebecchi 22'; Barrionuevo 63'

Umpires:
Julie Ashton-Lucy (AUS)
Marelize de Klerk (RSA)

==== Gold medal match ====
22 August 2008
20:30

(silver) China	0–2	Netherlands (gold)
	Report	Van As 51'; Goderie 62'

Umpires:
Soledad Iparraguirre (ARG)
Carolina de la Fuente (ARG)

== Final standings ==
As per statistical convention in field hockey, matches decided in extra time are counted as wins and losses, while matches decided by penalty shoot-outs are counted as draws.

Pos	Team	Pld	W	D	L	GF	GA	GD	Pts	Final result
1st place, gold medalist(s)	Netherlands	7	7	0	0	21	5	+16	21	Gold Medal
2nd place, silver medalist(s)	China (H)	7	4	1	2	17	8	+9	13	Silver Medal
3rd place, bronze medalist(s)	Argentina	7	4	2	1	18	13	+5	14	Bronze Medal
4	Germany	7	4	0	3	15	14	+1	12	Fourth place
5	Australia	6	4	1	1	19	9	+10	13	Eliminated in group stage
6	Great Britain	6	2	2	2	7	11	−4	8	Eliminated in group stage
7	Spain	6	3	0	3	7	14	−7	9	Eliminated in group stage
8	United States	6	1	3	2	11	11	0	6	Eliminated in group stage
9	South Korea	6	2	0	4	15	19	−4	6	Eliminated in group stage
10	Japan	6	1	1	4	6	9	−3	4	Eliminated in group stage
11	South Africa	6	1	0	5	6	19	−13	3	Eliminated in group stage
12	New Zealand	6	0	0	6	7	17	−10	0	Eliminated in group stage

Source: FIH
(H) Hosts

== Goalscorers ==
There were 149 goals scored in 38 matches, for an average of 3.92 goals per match.

11 goals

- (Netherlands) Maartje Paumen

5 goals

- (Argentina) Alejandra Gulla
- (China) Fu Baorong
- (South Korea) Lee Seon-ok

4 goals

- (Argentina) Carla Rebecchi
- (Australia) Casey Eastham
- (China) Tang Chunling
- (United States) Angela Loy

3 goals

- (Australia) Nicole Hudson
- (Australia) Angela Lambert
- (Australia) Sarah Young
- (China) Li Hongxia
- (United Kingdom) Crista Cullen
- (Germany) Anke Kühn
- (Germany) Fanny Rinne
- (United States) Keli Smith

2 goals

- (Argentina) Claudia Burkart
- (Argentina) Soledad García
- (Argentina) Mariné Russo
- (Australia) Shelly Liddelow
- (China) Gao Lihua
- (Germany) Janine Beermann
- (Germany) Eileen Hoffmann
- (Germany) Natascha Keller
- (Germany) Marion Rodewald
- (Japan) Keiko Miura
- (South Korea) Gim Sung-hee
- (South Korea) Park Jeong-sook
- (South Korea) Park Mi-hyun
- (Netherlands) Marilyn Agliotti
- (Netherlands) Ellen Hoog
- (New Zealand) Gemma Flynn
- (South Africa) Vida Ryan

1 goal

- (Argentina) Luciana Aymar
- (Argentina) Noel Barrionuevo
- (Argentina) Rosario Luchetti
- (Australia) Madonna Blyth
- (Australia) Emily Halliday
- (Australia) Hope Munro
- (Australia) Megan Rivers
- (China) Ma Yibo
- (China) Song Qingling
- (China) Zhao Yudiao
- (United Kingdom) Melanie Clewlow
- (United Kingdom) Alexandra Danson
- (United Kingdom) Anne Panter
- (United Kingdom) Sarah Thomas
- (Germany) Katharina Scholz
- (Japan) Kaori Chiba
- (Japan) Rika Komazawa
- (Japan) Sakae Morimoto
- (Japan) Toshie Tsukui
- (South Korea) Kim Da-rae
- (South Korea) Kim Eun-sil
- (South Korea) Kim Jong-eun
- (South Korea) Kim Mi-sun
- (Netherlands) Naomi van As
- (Netherlands) Minke Booij
- (Netherlands) Wieke Dijkstra
- (Netherlands) Maartje Goderie
- (Netherlands) Eefke Mulder
- (Netherlands) Janneke Schopman
- (New Zealand) Jaimee Claxton
- (New Zealand) Krystal Forgesson
- (New Zealand) Joanne Galletly
- (New Zealand) Elizabeth Igasan
- (New Zealand) Niniwa Roberts
- (South Africa) Cindy Brown
- (South Africa) Kate Hector
- (South Africa) Marsha Marescia
- (South Africa) Jennifer Wilson
- (Spain) Núria Camón
- (Spain) Raquel Huertas
- (Spain) Silvia Muñoz
- (Spain) María Romagosa
- (Spain) Pilar Sánchez
- (Spain) Esther Termens
- (Spain) Rocío Ybarra
- (United States) Kate Barber
- (United States) Kayla Bashore
- (United States) Dana Sensenig
- (United States) Tiffany Snow
