= Arrien (disambiguation) =

Arrien is a commune in the French department of Pyrénées-Atlantiques. It may also refer to:

== Places ==
- Arrien-en-Bethmale, commune in the French department of Ariège
- Arriën, hamlet in the province of Overijssel in the Netherlands

== People ==
- Angeles Arrien (1940–2014), Spanish-born American anthropologist
- Ricardo Arrien (born 1960), Spanish footballer
- Yesica Arrien (born 1980), Argentine footballer

== See also ==
- Arrienne Wynen (born 1955), Australian lawn bowler
- Arriens (disambiguation)
