= Wieke Dijkstra =

Dutch field hockey player

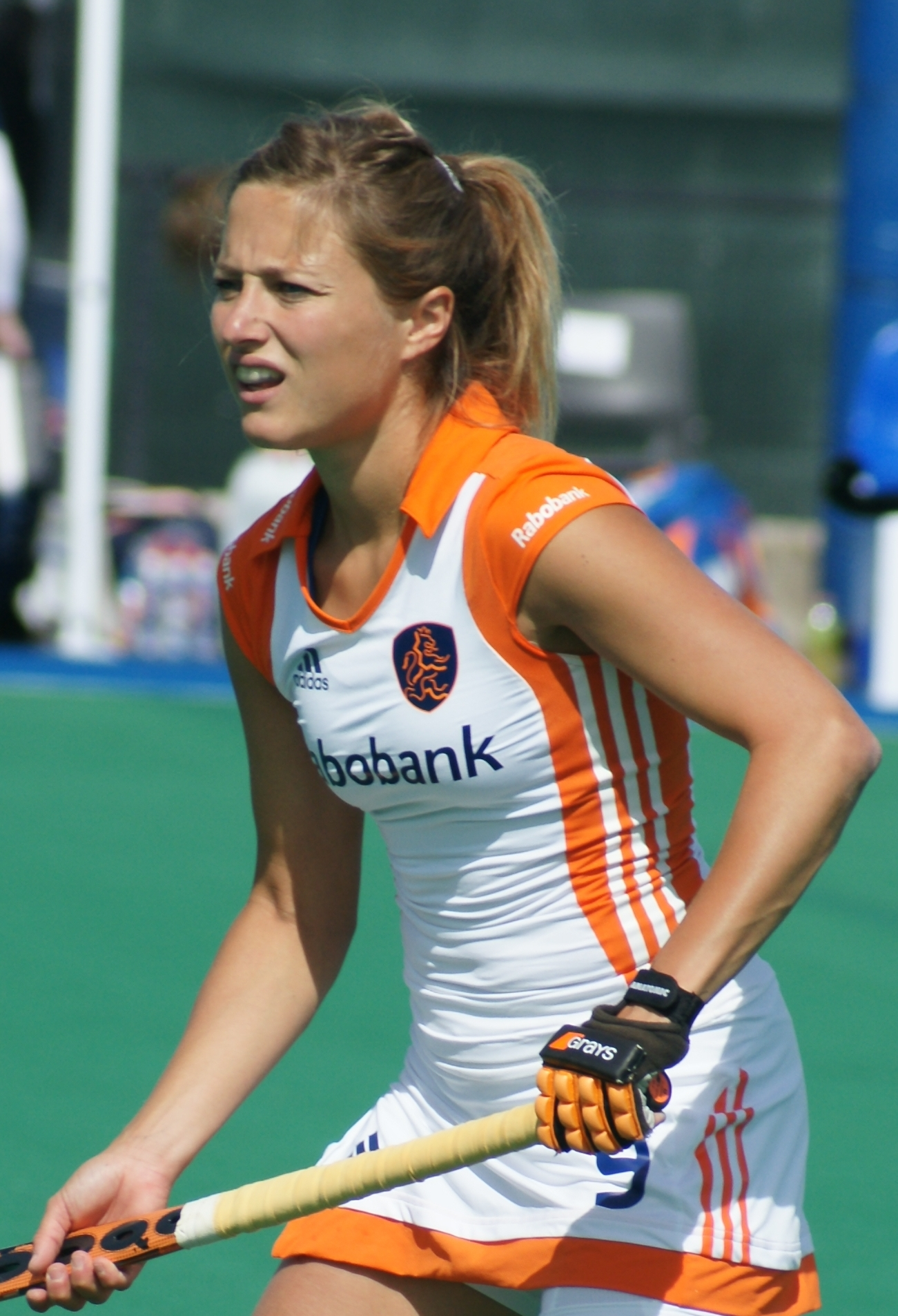

Medal record

Women's field hockey

Representing the Netherlands

Olympic Games
Gold medal – first place	2008 Beijing	Team competition

World Championship
Gold medal – first place	2006 Madrid	Team competition
Silver medal – second place	2010 Rosario	Team competition

European Championship
Silver medal – second place	2007 Manchester	Team competition

Champions Trophy
Gold medal – first place	2007 Quilmes	Team competition
Bronze medal – third place	2003 Sydney	Team competition
Bronze medal – third place	2006 Amstelveen	Team competition
Bronze medal – third place	2008 M'gladbach	Team competition

Wieke Elisabeth Henriëtte Dijkstra (born 19 June 1984) is a Dutch field hockey player, who plays as midfielder for Dutch club Laren.

Dijkstra was born in Amsterdam, North Holland. In addition to her club career, she plays for the Netherlands national team, most of the time as a defender. She was part of the Dutch squad that became world champions at the 2006 Women's Hockey World Cup and which won the 2007 Champions Trophy. She recently played her 70th official international match during the 2008 Beijing Olympics final.

At the 2008 Summer Olympics in Beijing she won an Olympic gold medal with the Dutch national team beating China in the final 2–0.
