= Eefke Mulder =

Dutch field hockey player (born 1977)

Medal record

Women's field hockey

Representing the Netherlands

Olympic Games
| Gold medal – first place | 2008 Beijing | Team competition |
| Silver medal – second place | 2004 Athens | Team competition |

European Championship
| Gold medal – first place | 1999 Cologne | Team competition |
| Silver medal – second place | 2007 Manchester | Team competition |

Champions Trophy
| Silver medal – second place | 1999 Brisbane | Team competition |
| Bronze medal – third place | 1997 Berlin | Team competition |
| Bronze medal – third place | 2003 Sydney | Team competition |
| Bronze medal – third place | 2006 Amstelveen | Team competition |
| Bronze medal – third place | 2008 M'gladbach | Team competition |

Eefke Mulder (born 13 October 1977 in Nijmegen, Gelderland) is a Dutch field hockey player, who played as a midfielder for Dutch club NMHC Nijmegen and the Netherlands national team. She made her debut for the national team on 2 June 1997 at the Champions Trophy in Berlin.

Mulder was a member of the Dutch squad that won the silver medal at the 2004 Summer Olympics in Athens. She was also part of the Dutch squad that became World Champions at the 2006 Women's Hockey World Cup in Madrid.

At the 2008 Summer Olympics in Beijing she won an Olympic gold medal with the Dutch national team, beating China 2–0 in the final.
