= Arriens =

Arriens is a surname. Notable people with the surname include:

- Carsten Arriens (born 1969), German tennis player
- Marigje Arriens (c. 1520–1591), Dutch alleged witch

== See also ==
- Arriens Glacier, tributary of the Lambert Glacier in Antarctica
- Arrien (disambiguation)
