= Gabriel Minadeo =

Argentine field hockey player

Gabriel Minadeo Ramírez (born July 27, 1967) is a male former field hockey player from Argentina. He competed for his native country at three consecutive Summer Olympics (1988, 1992, 1996).

At his last appearance (1996) Minadeo finished in eighth place with the Argentina men's national field hockey team. Later, he became an assistant in the staff guided by Sergio Vigil during all of his period as coach of the Argentina women's national field hockey team. In 2005 he was appointed coach himself after Vigil resigned.

Minadeo coached Las Leonas to bronze medals at the 2008 Summer Olympics and at the 2006 World Cup. Under his guidance, the national squad also won the gold medal at the 2008 Champions Trophy, silver medal at the 2007 Champions Trophy, the gold medal at the 2007 Pan American Games and at the 2009 Pan American Cup.

In 2015, he was appointed as coach once again after Santiago Capurro resigned. Under his guidance, Las Leonas won the 2014–15 Hockey World League and 2016 Hockey Champions Trophy.
