= 2008 Women's Hockey Champions Trophy =

Field hockey tournament

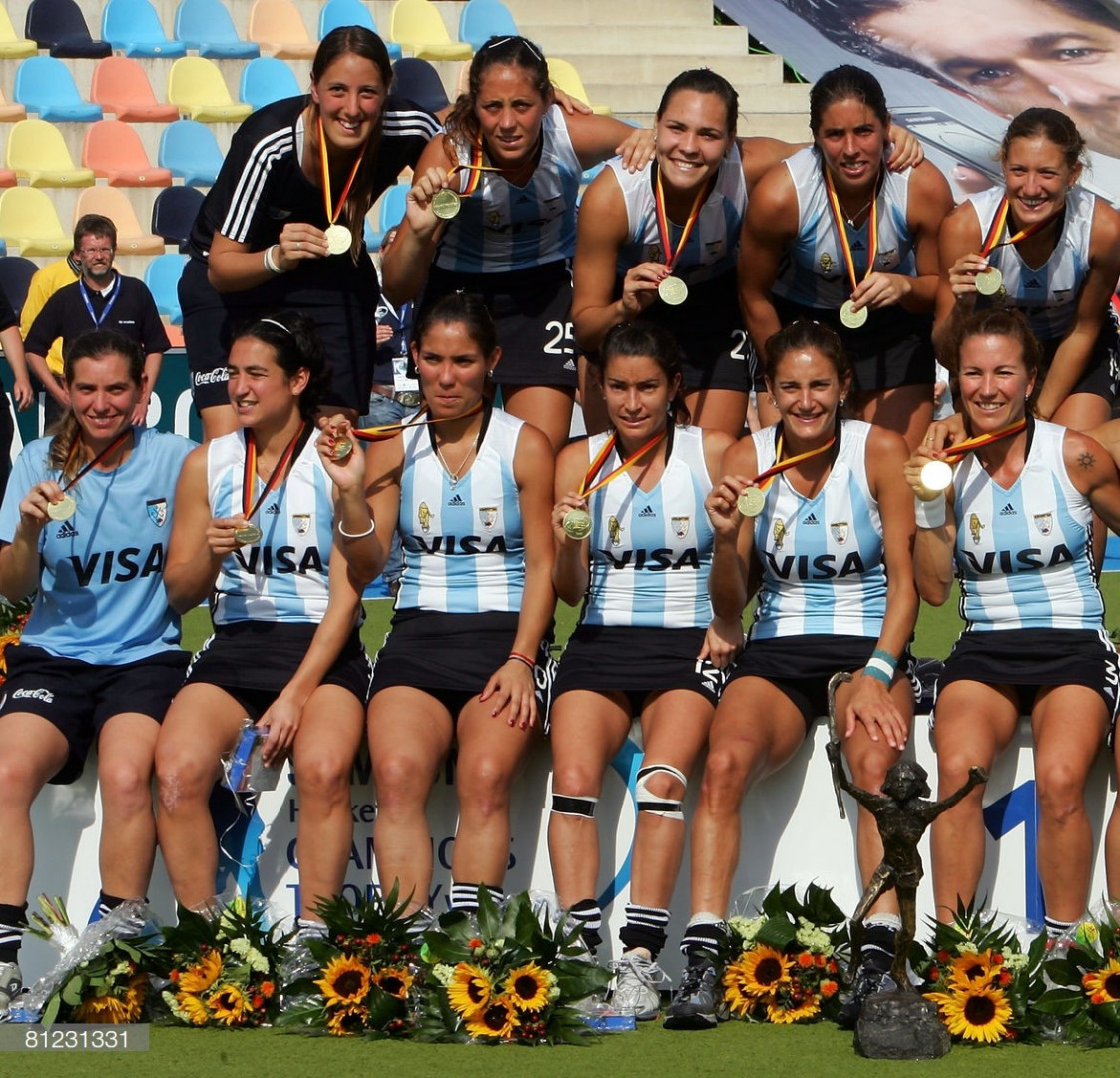
- Argentina, champions

Tournament details
- Host country: Germany
- City: Mönchengladbach
- Teams: 6
- Venue: Warsteiner HockeyPark

Final positions
- Champions: Argentina (2nd title)
- Runner-up: Germany
- Third place: Netherlands

Tournament statistics
- Matches played: 18
- Goals scored: 58 (3.22 per match)
- Top scorer(s): (Australia) Megan Rivers (Netherlands) Marilyn Agliotti (5 goals)
- Best player: (Argentina) Luciana Aymar

The 2008 Women's Hockey Champions Trophy was the 16th edition of the Hockey Champions Trophy for women. It was held between 17 and 25 May 2008 in Mönchengladbach, Germany.

Argentina won the tournament after 7 years for the second time after defeating Germany 6–2 in the final.

== Teams ==
Teams participating as announced by International Hockey Federation (FIH):

- Netherlands (defending champions and champions of 2006 World Cup)
- Germany (host nation and champions of 2004 Summer Olympics)
- Australia (second in 2006 World Cup)
- Argentina (third in 2006 World Cup)
- Japan (fifth in 2006 World Cup)
- China (host of 2008 Summer Olympics)

== Squads ==
Argentina

Head coach: Gabriel Minadeo

1. Belén Succi (GK)
3. Magdalena Aicega (c)
4. Rosario Luchetti
7. Alejandra Gulla
8. Luciana Aymar
9. Agustina Bouza
10. Soledad García
11. Carla Rebecchi
12. Mariana González Oliva
14. Mercedes Margalot
15. María de la Paz Hernández
16. Mariana Rossi
18. Paola Vukojicic (GK)
19. Mariné Russo
22. Gabriela Aguirre
24. Claudia Burkart
25. Silvina D'Elía
27. Noel Barrionuevo
Australia

Head coach: Frank Murray

2. Suzie Faulkner
3. Wendy Beattie
4. Casey Eastham
6. Megan Rivers
7. Kim Walker
9. Rebecca Sanders
10. Kate Hollywood
11. Emily Halliday
12. Madonna Blyth
14. Nicole Arrold
15. Kobie McGurk
17. Rachel Imison (GK)
24. Angie Skirving
25. Melanie Twitt
28. Hope Munro
29. Teneal Attard
30. Sarah Young
32. Nikki Hudson (c)
China

Head coach: Kim Chang-back

3. Chen Zhaoxia
4. Ma Yibo
5. Cheng Hui
7. Huang Junxia
8. Fu Baorong
9. Li Shuang
10. Gao Lihua
11. Tang Chunling
12. Zhou Wanfeng
13. Sun Zhen
16. Zhang Yimeng
17. Li Hongxia
18. Ren Ye
19. Chen Qiuqi
21. Zhao Yudiao
22. Song Qingling
25. Li Aili
31. Pan Fengzhen
Germany

Head coach: Michael Behrmann

1. Yvonne Frank (GK)
2. Tina Bachmann
4. Mandy Haase
7. Natascha Keller
8. Kerstin Hoyer
10. Nina Kasselmann
11. Eileen Hoffmann
13. Marion Rodewald
16. Fanny Rinne (c)
18. Anke Kühn
20. Anneke Böhmert
22. Janine Beermann
24. Maike Stöckel
25. Janne Müller-Wieland
26. Christina Schütze
28. Julia Müller
29. Lina Geyer
32. Kristina Reynolds (GK)
Japan

Head coach: Yoo Seung-jin

1. Ikuko Okamura
2. Keiko Miura
4. Mayumi Ono
5. Chie Kimura
6. Rika Komazawa
7. Miyuki Nakagawa
8. Sakae Morimoto
9. Kaori Chiba
10. Yukari Yamamoto
11. Toshie Tsukui
12. Yuku Kitano
13. Sachimi Iwao
14. Akemi Kato (c)
15. Tomomi Komori
18. Misaki Ozawa
20. Chinami Kozakura
21. Chie Akutsu
22. Yuka Yoshikawa
Netherlands

Head coach: Marc Lammers

1. Lisanne de Roever (GK)
3. Eefke Mulder
4. Fatima Moreira de Melo (c)
5. Renske van Geel
6. Fleur van Dooren
9. Wieke Dijkstra
13. Minke Smabers
14. Marieke Dijkstra
16. Carlijn Welten
17. Roël Kuyvenhoven
18. Naomi van As
19. Claire Verhage
21. Marise Jongepier
23. Kiki Collot d'Escury
24. Eva de Goede
25. Carlien Dirkse van den Heuvel
26. Michelle van der Pols
27. Marilyn Agliotti

== Umpires ==
Below are the 8 umpires appointed by the International Hockey Federation:

- Frances Block (ENG)
- Caroline Brunekreef (NED)
- Marelize de Klerk (RSA)
- Christiane Hippler (GER)
- Anne McRae (SCO)
- Miao Lin (CHN)
- Chieko Soma (JPN)
- Gina Spitaleri (ITA)

== Results ==
All times are Central European Summer Time (UTC+02:00)

=== Pool ===
Pos	Team	Pld	W	D	L	GF	GA	GD	Pts	Qualification
1	Argentina	5	3	1	1	7	4	+3	10	Final
2	Germany	5	3	1	1	7	4	+3	10	Final
3	Netherlands	5	3	0	2	7	6	+1	9	
4	China	5	1	2	2	9	12	−3	5	
5	Australia	5	1	1	3	8	9	−1	4	
6	Japan	5	1	1	3	6	9	−3	4	

Source: FIH
Rules for classification: 1) points; 2) goal difference; 3) goals scored; 4) head-to-head result.

17 May 2008
13:05

Australia	2–0	Japan
Eastham 18'; Halliday 61'	Report

Umpires:
Caroline Brunekreef (NED)
Miao Lin (CHN)

17 May 2008
15:05

Netherlands	2–1	Germany
Agliotti 41'; Van As 60'	Report	Schütze 16'

Umpires:
Marelize de Klerk (RSA)
Frances Block (ENG)

17 May 2008
17:05

China	2–1	Argentina
Zhao Yudiao 45'; Ma Yibo 70'	Report	Barrionuevo 51'

Umpires:
Gina Spitaleri (ITA)
Christine Hippler (GER)

18 May 2008
14:05

Germany	2–1	Australia
Kühn 7'; Böhmert 18'	Report	Rivers 65'

Umpires:
Gina Spitaleri (ITA)
Chieko Soma (JPN)

18 May 2008
16:05

Netherlands	3–1	China
Agliotti 24', 53'; Smabers 59'	Report	Zhao Yudiao 13'

Umpires:
Frances Block (ENG)
Anne McRae (SCO)

18 May 2008
18:05

Argentina	2–1	Japan
Bouza 29'; Burkart 63'	Report	Chiba 69'

Umpires:
Marelize de Klerk (RSA)
Miao Lin (CHN)

20 May 2008
18:05

Australia	1–2	Argentina
Rivers 42'	Report	Barrionuevo 27'; Luchetti 53'

Umpires:
Chieko Soma (JPN)
Christiane Hippler (GER)

20 May 2008
20:05

Japan	1–2	Germany
Kimura 60'	Report	Kühn 40'; Keller 56'

Umpires:
Anne McRae (SCO)
Caroline Brunekreef (NED)

21 May 2008
16:05

China	3–3	Australia
Ma Yibo 17'; Fu Baorong 48'; Zhao Yudiao 62'	Report	Young 4'; Rivers 16'; McGurk 70'

Umpires:
Gina Spitaleri (ITA)
Frances Block (ENG)

21 May 2008
18:05

Japan	1–0	Netherlands
Chiba 50'	Report

Umpires:
Marelize de Klerk (RSA)
Christiane Hippler (GER)

22 May 2008
14:05

Germany	2–0	China
Böhmert 34'; Beermann 41'	Report

Umpires:
Chieko Soma (JPN)
Anne McRae (SCO)

22 May 2008
16:05

Argentina	2–0	Netherlands
Rebecchi 11'; Aymar 15'	Report

Umpires:
Gina Spitaleri (ITA)
Miao Lin (CHN)

24 May 2008
12:05

Germany	0–0	Argentina
	Report

Umpires:
Marelize de Klerk (RSA)
Caroline Brunekreef (NED)

24 May 2008
14:05

China	3–3	Japan
Ren Ye 33'; Zhou Wanfeng 51'; Ma Yibo 63'	Report	Tsukui 15'; Chiba 40', 54'

Umpires:
Anne McRae (SCO)
Frances Block (ENG)

24 May 2008
16:05

Australia	1–2	Netherlands
Rivers 52'	Report	Agliotti 27'; Mulder 37'

Umpires:
Chieko Soma (JPN)
Miao Lin (CHN)

=== Classification ===
==== Fifth and sixth place ====
25 May 2008
10:05

Australia	3–0	Japan
Young 28'; Rivers 56'; Hudson 61'	Report

Umpires:
Christiane Hippler (GER)
Caroline Brunekreef (NED)

==== Third and fourth place ====
25 May 2008
12:35

Netherlands	3–0	China
Agliotti 7'; Dijkstra 35'; Mulder 61'	Report

Umpires:
Anne McRae (SCO)
Gina Spitaleri (ITA)

==== Final ====
25 May 2008
15:05

Argentina	6–2	Germany
García 4'; Gulla 8', 37', 69'; Rebecchi 22'; Burkart 51'	Report	Beermann 5'; Hoyer 47'

Umpires:
Marelize de Klerk (RSA)
Chieko Soma (JPN)

Team details

Argentina
Germany

GK	18	Paola Vukojicic
DF	14	Mercedes Margalot
DF	3	Magdalena Aicega (c)
DF	16	Mariana Rossi
DF	24	Claudia Burkart
DF	27	Noel Barrionuevo
MF	12	Mariana González Oliva
MF	8	Luciana Aymar
FW	7	Alejandra Gulla
FW	10	Soledad García
FW	11	Carla Rebecchi
Substitutions:
MF	4	Rosario Luchetti	(substituted on) 10'
FW	9	Agustina Bouza	(substituted on) 12'
FW	15	María Paz Hernández	(substituted on) 8'
MF	19	Mariné Russo	(substituted on) 11'
Manager:
(Argentina) Gabriel Minadeo

GK	32	Kristina Reynolds
DF	2	Tina Bachmann
DF	4	Mandy Haase
DF	13	Marion Rodewald (c)
MF	16	Fanny Rinne
MF	18	Anke Kühne	42'
MF	22	Janine Beermann
MF	28	Julia Müller
MF	10	Nina Kasselmann
FW	7	Natascha Keller
FW	24	Maike Stöckel
Substitutions:
	8	Kerstin Hoyer		(substituted on) 7'
	11	Eileen Hoffmann		(substituted on) 7'
DF	25	Janne Müller-Wieland		(substituted on) 8'
	26	Christina Schütze		(substituted on) 11'
Manager:
(Germany) Michael Behrmann

== Awards ==
Player of the Tournament	Top Goalscorers	Goalkeeper of the Tournament	Young Player of the Tournament
(Argentina) Luciana Aymar	(Australia) Megan Rivers (Netherlands) Marilyn Agliotti	(Germany) Kristina Reynolds	(China) Zhao Yudiao

== Statistics ==
=== Final standings ===
1. Argentina
2. Germany
3. Netherlands
4. China
5. Australia
6. Japan

=== Goalscorers ===
There were 58 goals scored in 18 matches, for an average of 3.22 goals per match.

5 goals

- (Australia) Megan Rivers
- (Netherlands) Marilyn Agliotti

4 goals

- (Japan) Kaori Chiba

3 goals

- (Argentina) Alejandra Gulla
- (China) Ma Yibo
- (China) Zhao Yudiao

2 goals

- (Argentina) Noel Barrionuevo
- (Argentina) Claudia Burkart
- (Argentina) Carla Rebecchi
- (Australia) Sarah Young
- (Germany) Janine Beermann
- (Germany) Anneke Böhmert
- (Germany) Anke Kühn
- (Netherlands) Eefke Mulder

1 goal

- (Argentina) Luciana Aymar
- (Argentina) Agustina Bouza
- (Argentina) Soledad García
- (Argentina) Rosario Luchetti
- (Australia) Casey Eastham
- (Australia) Emily Halliday
- (Australia) Nicole Hudson
- (Australia) Kobie McGurk
- (China) Fu Baorong
- (China) Ren Ye
- (China) Zhou Wanfeng
- (Germany) Kerstin Hoyer
- (Germany) Natascha Keller
- (Germany) Christina Schütze
- (Japan) Chie Kimura
- (Japan) Toshie Tsukui
- (Netherlands) Wieke Dijkstra
- (Netherlands) Minke Smabers
- (Netherlands) Naomi van As

Source: FIH
