= Mariana Rossi =

Argentine field hockey player

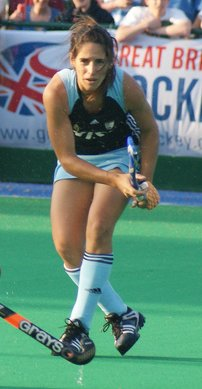

Personal information
- Full name: Mariana Rossi
- Born: January 2, 1979 (age 47) Vicente López, Buenos Aires, Argentina
- Height: 1.69 m (5 ft 6 1/2 in)

Sport
- Sport: Field hockey
- Position: Defender
- Club: St. Catherine's
Senior career
Years	Team	Caps	Goals
–	St. Catherine's	-	-
National team
Years	Team	Caps	Goals
1997	Argentina U21		-
2008–2014	Argentina	102	-
Medal record
Women's Field hockey
Representing Argentina
Summer Olympics
Bronze medal – third place	2008 Beijing	Team
World Cup
Gold medal – first place	2010 Rosario	Team
Bronze medal – third place	2014 The Hague	Team
Champions Trophy
Gold medal – first place	2008 Mönchengladbach	Team
Gold medal – first place	2010 Nottingham	Team
Pan American Cup
Gold medal – first place	2013 Mendoza	Team

Mariana Rossi (born 2 January 1979 in Vicente López, Buenos Aires) is an Argentine field hockey player, who won a bronze medal with the national women's hockey team at the 2008 Summer Olympics in Beijing. Mariana has also won the World Cup in 2010, two Champions Trophy (2008, 2010) and the gold medal at the Pan American Cup in 2013.
