= Janneke Schopman =

Dutch field hockey player (born 1977)

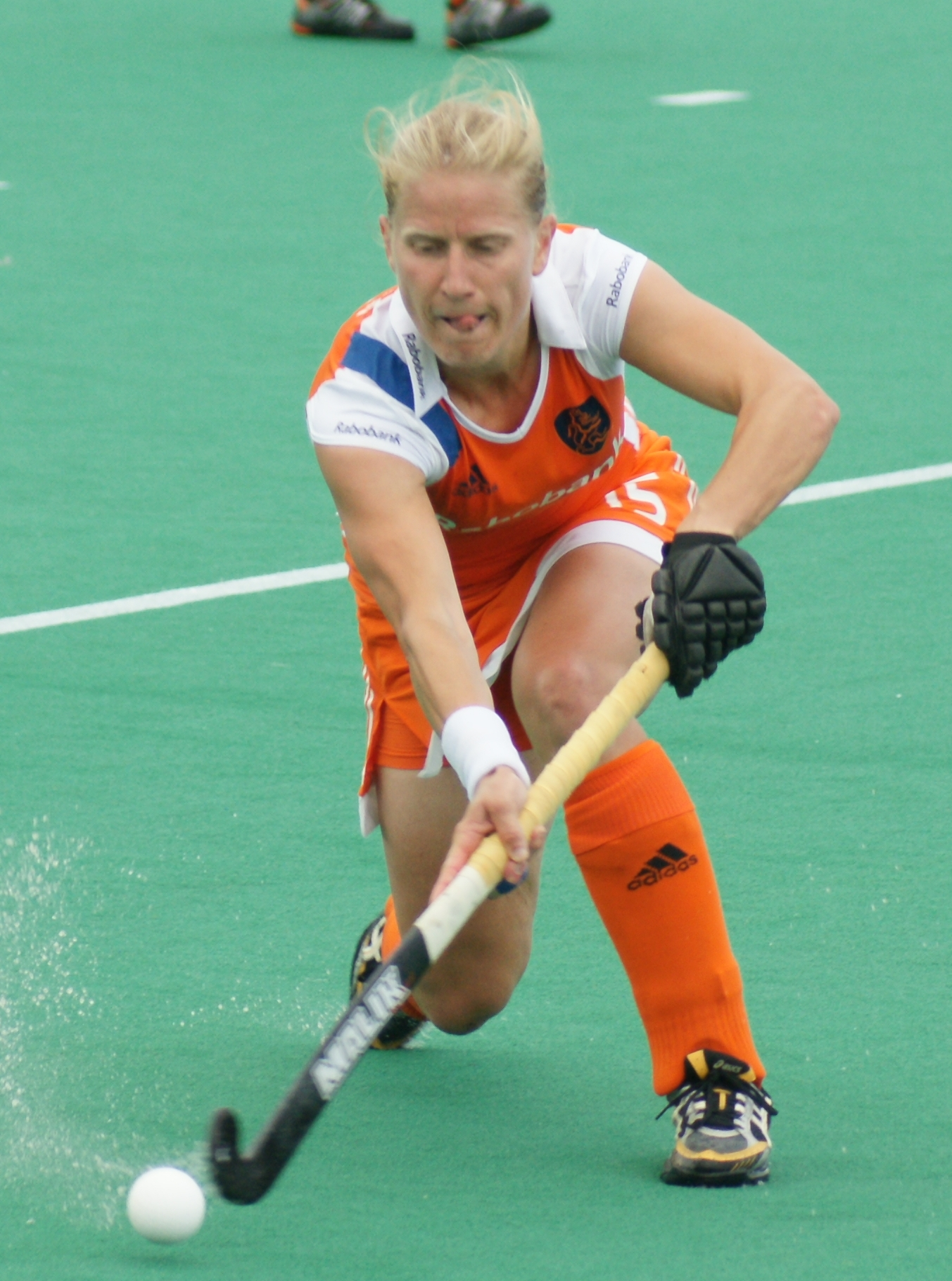

Personal information
- Full name: Johanna Dorotheo Maria Schopman
- Born: 26 April 1977 (age 49) Haarlem, Netherlands
- Height: 1.68 m (5 ft 6 in)
- Weight: 65 kg (143 lb)

Sport
- Sport: Field hockey
- Position: Defender
National team
Years	Team	Caps	Goals
2001–2010	Netherlands	212	(39)
Coaching career
- Years: Team
- 2010–2014: SCHC
- 2014–2017: United States U21
- 2017–2020: United States
- 2021–2024: India
- 2023: India U21
- 2024–: Odisha Warriors
- 2024–: Germany
Medal record
Women's field hockey
Representing Netherlands
Olympic Games
Gold medal – first place	2008 Beijing	Team
Silver medal – second place	2004 Athens	Team
World Cup
Gold medal – first place	2006 Madrid
Silver medal – second place	2002 Perth
Silver medal – second place	2010 Rosario
European Championship
Gold medal – first place	2003 Barcelona
Gold medal – first place	2005 Dublin
Gold medal – first place	2009 Amstelveen
Silver medal – second place	2007 Manchester
Champions Trophy
Gold medal – first place	2004 Rosario
Gold medal – first place	2005 Canberra
Gold medal – first place	2007 Quilmes
Silver medal – second place	2001 Amstelveen
Silver medal – second place	2010 Nottingham
Bronze medal – third place	2002 Macau
Bronze medal – third place	2003 Sydney
Bronze medal – third place	2006 Amstelveen
Bronze medal – third place	2009 Sydney

Johanna "Janneke" Dorotheo Maria Schopman (born 26 April 1977) is a former Dutch field hockey player who played as a defender for Dutch club HC Den Bosch and the Netherlands national team. She served as the head coach of the Indian women's national field hockey team. Since 2024 she serves as head coach of the women's National field hockey team of Germany.

== Playing career ==
Schopman started playing hockey at Dutch club Tempo '34 in Rotterdam. She also played for HC Rotterdam, before transferring to HC Den Bosch, where she played until 2010. While part of the Den Bosch squad, she won 6 national titles.

Schopman was first selected for the Dutch national squad in 2001. Schopman was a member of the Dutch squad that won the silver medal at the 2004 Summer Olympics in Athens, after losing to Germany in the final. She scored one of the penalties in the semi-finals against Argentina. She was also part of the Dutch squad that became World Champion at the 2006 Women's Hockey World Cup in Madrid and which won the 2007 Champions Trophy. She was part of the 2007 squad that was featured in the documentary 'Goud' by Niek Koppen, about their preparation for the 2007 Women's EuroHockey Nations Championship. At the 2008 Summer Olympics in Beijing she won an Olympic gold medal with the Dutch national team beating China in the final 2–0. She was the captain of the Dutch national squad during the 2010 World Cup in Rosario, where they won the silver medal after losing to Argentina 1–3 in the final.

== Coaching career ==
After ending her career as a professional hockey player in 2010, Schopman became the head coach for the women's squad of the Dutch club SCHC. In 2014, she led the team to their first appearance in the final of the Hoofdklasse, the top league in the Netherlands. In 2014, Schopman was assigned to be the head coach for the U21 US Women's National Team and assistant coach for the United States women's national team under Craig Parnham. In January 2017 she became the US Women's National Team head coach. With Schopman as head coach, the team came 3rd in the 2017 Pan American Cup in Lancaster, United States, and 14th in the 2018 World Cup in London, United Kingdom.

Indian hockey women's team made her their analytical coach in January 2020. After the Tokyo Olympics, Sjoerd Marijne, the previous head coach of the team, declined a contract extension, and Schopman became the head coach. She resigned from her position in February 2024.
