= Daiana Cardone =

Argentine footballer (born 1989)

Personal information
- Date of birth: 1 January 1989 (age 37)
- Place of birth: Argentina
- Position: Defender

Senior career*
Years	Team	Apps	(Gls)
2008	Independiente		

International career
2008	Argentina	0 (?)	(0)
- * Club domestic league appearances and goals

Daiana Cardone (born 1 January 1989) is an Argentine former footballer who played as a defender.

She was part of the Argentina women's national football team at the 2008 Summer Olympics. On club level she played for Independiente.

== See also ==
- Argentina at the 2008 Summer Olympics
