= Paola Vukojicic =

Argentine field hockey player

Personal information
- Born: August 28, 1974 (age 51)
Medal record
Women's field hockey
Representing Argentina
Olympic Games
Silver medal – second place	2000 Sydney	Team
Bronze medal – third place	2004 Athens	Team
Bronze medal – third place	2008 Beijing	Team
World Cup
Gold medal – first place	2002 Perth	Team
Bronze medal – third place	2006 Madrid	Team
Champions Trophy
Gold medal – first place	2001 Amstelveen	Team
Gold medal – first place	2008 Mönchengladbach	Team
Silver medal – second place	2002 Macau	Team
Silver medal – second place	2007 Quilmes	Team
Bronze medal – third place	2004 Rosario	Team
Pan American Games
Gold medal – first place	1999 Winnipeg	Team
Gold medal – first place	2007 Rio de Janeiro	Team

Paola Vukojicic (Serbian: Paola Vukojičić, Паола Вукојчић; born August 28, 1974) is a retired field hockey goalkeeper from Argentina, who won the silver medal with the national women's hockey team at the 2000 Summer Olympics in Sydney, the bronze medal at the 2004 Summer Olympics in Athens, Greece and at the 2008 Summer Olympics in Beijing, China, the World Cup in 2002, two Champions Trophy (2001, 2008) and two Pan American Games. She started playing the sport at San Isidro Club, and made her debut for Argentina in the 1998 World Hockey Cup in Utrecht.
