= Mercedes Margalot =

Argentine field hockey player

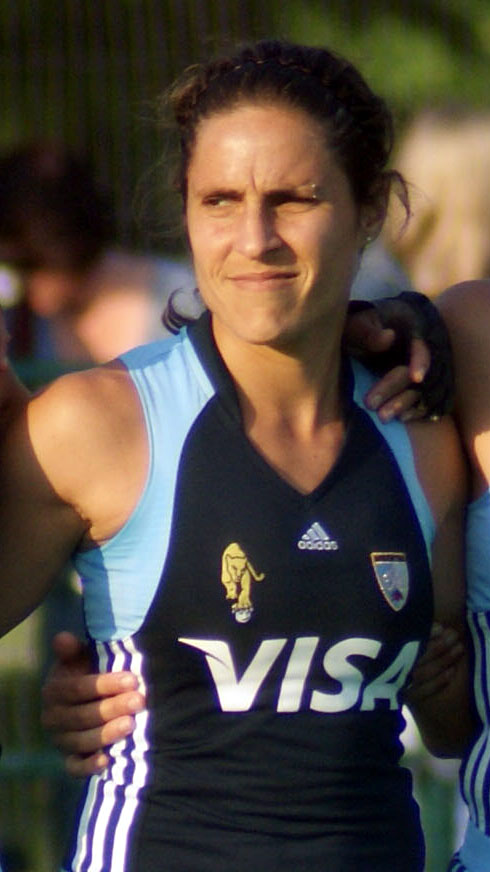

Medal record

Women's field hockey

Representing Argentina

Olympic Games
Silver medal – second place	2000 Sydney	Team
Bronze medal – third place	2004 Athens	Team
Bronze medal – third place	2008 Beijing	Team

World Cup
Gold medal – first place	2002 Perth	
Bronze medal – third place	2006 Madrid	

Champions Trophy
Gold medal – first place	2001 Amstelveen	
Gold medal – first place	2008 Mönchengladbach	
Silver medal – second place	2002 Macau	
Bronze medal – third place	2004 Rosario	

Pan American Games
Gold medal – first place	1999 Winnipeg	
Gold medal – first place	2003 Santo Domingo	
Gold medal – first place	2007 Rio de Janeiro	

Pan American Cup
Gold medal – first place	2001 Kingston	

María Mercedes "Mechi" Margalot (born 28 June 1975 in Buenos Aires) is an Argentine retired field hockey player, who won the silver medal with the national field hockey team at the 2000 Summer Olympics in Sydney.

Four years later, when Athens, Greece hosted the Olympics, she won the bronze medal with the Argentine squad. Mercedes also won the bronze medal at the 2008 Summer Olympics in Beijing, the World Cup in 2002, two Champions Trophy (2001, 2008), three medals at the Pan American Games (1999, 2003, 2007) and the Pan American Cup in 2001.

Margalot played club hockey in the Netherlands, first for Oranje Zwart of Eindhoven and then for Push of Breda.
