= Lesley Magnus =

Canadian field hockey player

Lesley Magnus (born October 6, 1977 in Tisdale, Saskatchewan) is a field hockey player from Oliver, British Columbia, Canada, who was first selected with the Women's National Team for the 2000 Test Series against the United States. The resident of Vancouver earned her first cap on July 10. Magnus was also selected for the 2000 European Tour (Germany and the Netherlands), and the 2002 European Tour (Scotland and Wales).

== International senior tournaments ==
- 2003 – Pan American Games, Santo Domingo (5th)
- 2004 – Pan Am Cup, Bridgetown, Barbados (3rd)
