= Mariné Russo =

Argentine field hockey player

Personal information
- Born: January 9, 1980 (age 46)
Medal record
Women's field hockey
Representing Argentina
Summer Olympics
Bronze medal – third place	2004 Athens	Team
Bronze medal – third place	2008 Beijing	Team
World Cup
Gold medal – first place	2002 Perth	Team
Gold medal – first place	2010 Rosario	Team
Bronze medal – third place	2006 Madrid	Team
Champions Trophy
Gold medal – first place	2001 Amstelveen	Team
Gold medal – first place	2008 Mönchengladbach	Team
Gold medal – first place	2009 Sydney	Team
Gold medal – first place	2010 Nottingham	Team
Silver medal – second place	2002 Macau	Team
Silver medal – second place	2007 Quilmes	Team
Bronze medal – third place	2004 Rosario	Team
Pan American Games
Gold medal – first place	2007 Rio de Janeiro	Team
Pan American Cup
Gold medal – first place	2001 Kingston	Team
Gold medal – first place	2004 Bridgetown	Team

Mariné Russo (born January 9, 1980, in Quilmes) is a retired field hockey player from Argentina who won the bronze medal at the 2004 and 2008 Summer Olympics with the Argentina national team. Mariné also won two World Cups (2002 and 2010), four Champions Trophy, the gold medal at the 2007 Pan American Games and two Pan American Cups. She was affiliated with Quilmes Atletico Club in Buenos Aires.
