= Paul Calello =

American banker (1961–2010)

Paul Calello (February 14, 1961 – November 16, 2010) was the chairman and CEO of the investment banking division of Credit Suisse Group.

Callelo was born in Boston, and earned his undergraduate degree from Villanova University in 1983. He received his MBA from Columbia Business School in 1987, where, in October 2010, the Paul Calello Professorship of Leadership and Ethics was endowed in his honor by former colleagues.

He worked for the Federal Reserve in Boston and New York before starting his career in banking.

Calello was part of a derivatives team from Bankers Trust who joined Credit Suisse in 1990 and was a member of the group that founded Credit Suisse Financial Products. He was named chairman of Credit Suisse First Boston's Asian operations in 2002, and was widely credited for managing the bank's significant growth in the region. Leaving Hong Kong in 2007, Calello returned to New York to assume the role of global CEO of Credit Suisse's investment banking business. After being diagnosed with non-Hodgkin lymphoma in 2009, he stepped down as CEO of the investment bank, but was appointed chairman ten months later.

Calello and his wife had four children. He died at the age of 49 on November 16, 2010, at his home in Brooklyn due to non-Hodgkin lymphoma.

== See also ==
- Ovide, Shira; Lucchetti, Aaron (November 16, 2010). "Paul Calello, Ex-CEO of Credit Suisse Investment Bank, Dies". The Wall Street Journal.
- Abelson, Max (November 22, 2010). "Requiem for a Banker". The New York Observer. Archived from the original on November 25, 2010.
