= Yesica Arrien =

Argentine footballer (born 1980)

Personal information
- Date of birth: 1 July 1980 (age 46)
- Place of birth: La Plata, Argentina
- Position: Defender

Senior career*
Years	Team	Apps	(Gls)
2008	Estudiantes de La Plata		
–2019	Boca Juniors		
2019–	Racing		

International career
2003–2008	Argentina	2	(0)
- * Club domestic league appearances and goals

Yesica Arrien (born 1 July 1980) is an Argentine footballer who plays as a defender for Racing Club de Avellaneda. She was a member of the Argentina women's national team.

== International career ==
Arrien played for Argentina at the 2008 Summer Olympics.

== See also ==
- Argentina at the 2008 Summer Olympics
