= Guadalupe Calello =

Argentine footballer

Personal information
- Date of birth: 13 April 1990 (age 36)
- Place of birth: Argentina
- Position: Goalkeeper

Senior career*
Years	Team	Apps	(Gls)
2008	River Plate		

International career
2008	Argentina	0 (?)	(0)
- * Club domestic league appearances and goals

Guadalupe Calello (born 13 April 1990) is an Argentine former footballer who played as a goalkeeper.

She was part of the Argentina women's national football team at the 2008 Summer Olympics.

== See also ==
- Argentina at the 2008 Summer Olympics
