= Soledad García =

Argentine field hockey player

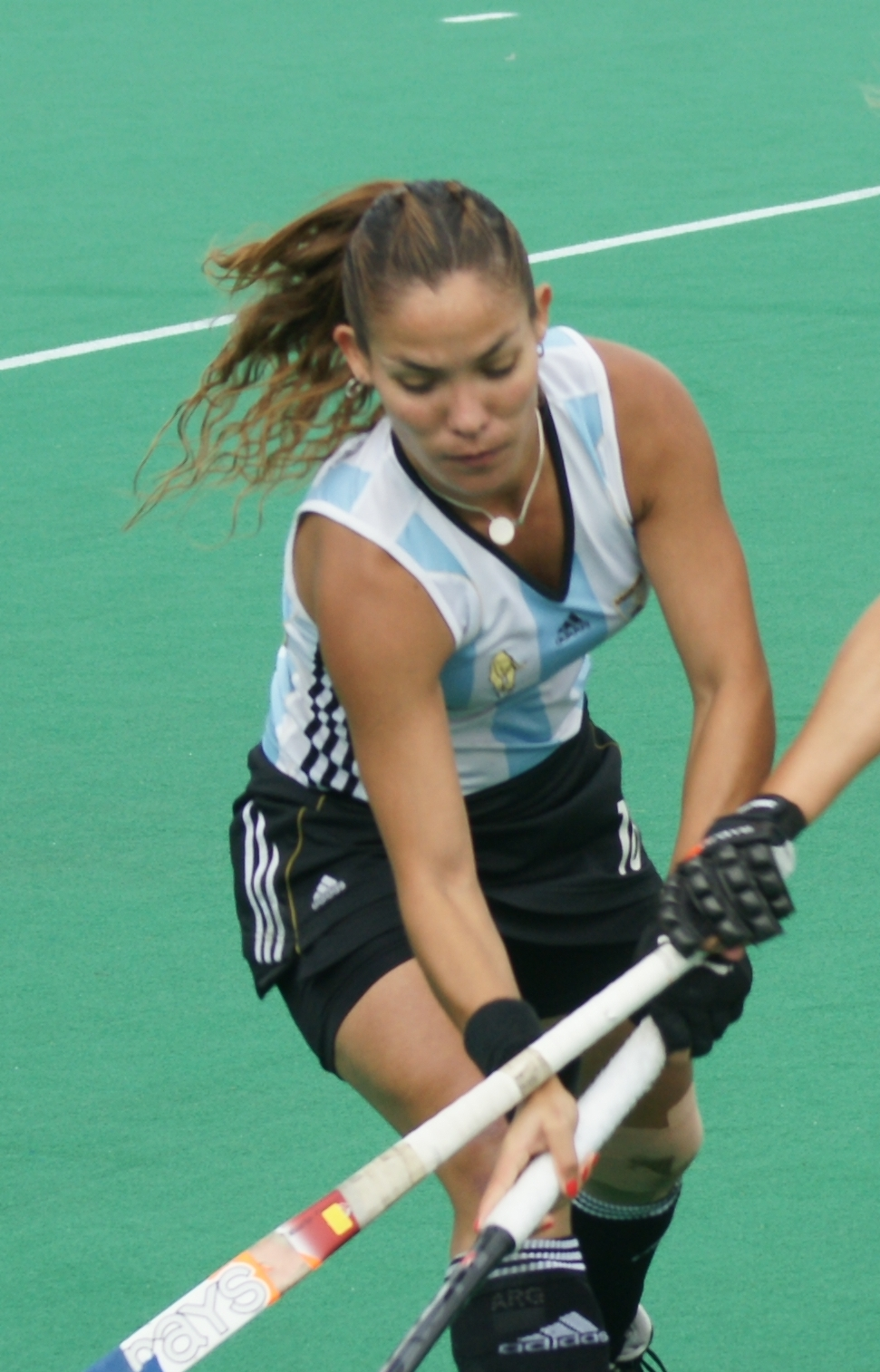

Personal information
- Full name: Agustina Soledad García
- Born: June 12, 1981 (age 45) Córdoba, Argentina
- Height: 1.68 m (5 ft 6 in)

Sport
- Sport: Field hockey
- Position: Forward
- Club: [Uru Cure Rugby Club]
Senior career
Years	Team	Caps	Goals
–	Rot-Weiss Köln	-	-
–	Universitario de Córdoba	-	-
–	B.H.V. Push	-	-
–	Laren	-	-
–	SCHC	-	-
National team
Years	Team	Caps	Goals
1997–2001	Argentina U21		-
1999–2011	Argentina	231	-
Medal record
Women's field hockey
Representing Argentina
Olympic Games
Silver medal – second place	2000 Sydney	Team
Bronze medal – third place	2004 Athens	Team
Bronze medal – third place	2008 Beijing	Team
World Cup
Gold medal – first place	2002 Perth	Team
Gold medal – first place	2010 Rosario	Team
Bronze medal – third place	2006 Madrid	Team
Champions Trophy
Gold medal – first place	2008 Mönchengladbach	Team
Gold medal – first place	2009 Sydney	Team
Gold medal – first place	2010 Nottingham	Team
Silver medal – second place	2002 Macau	Team
Silver medal – second place	2007 Quilmes	Team
Silver medal – second place	2011 Amstelveen	Team
Bronze medal – third place	2004 Rosario	Team
Pan American Games
Gold medal – first place	1999 Winnipeg	Team
Gold medal – first place	2003 Santo Domingo	Team
Silver medal – second place	2011 Guadalajara	Team
Pan American Cup
Gold medal – first place	2001 Kingston	Team
Gold medal – first place	2004 Bridgetown	Team
Junior World Cup
Silver medal – second place	2001 Buenos Aires	Team
Bronze medal – third place	1997 Seongnam	Team
- Updated on October 1, 2010

Agustina Soledad "Sole" García (born June 12, 1981) is a retired Argentine field hockey player. She won the silver medal with the national field hockey team at the 2000 Summer Olympics in Sydney and the bronze medal at the 2004 Summer Olympics in Athens and at the 2008 Summer Olympics in Beijing. The striker has been named World Hockey Women's Young Player of the Year by the International Hockey Federation twice (2002 and 2004).

Soledad also won the World Cup in 2002 and 2010, three Champions Trophy, two gold medals at the 1999 Pan American Games, 2003 Pan American Games, and two Pan American Cups.

Since retiring from playing international hockey, Soledad has started coaching and is the assistant coach of the Canada women's national field hockey team. As assistant coach, she has attended a number of events including the 2022 Commonwealth Games.

Awards
Preceded by (Australia) Angie Skirving	FIH Young Player of the Year; 2002	Succeeded by (Netherlands) Maartje Scheepstra
Preceded by (Netherlands) Maartje Scheepstra	FIH Young Player of the Year; 2004	Succeeded by (Netherlands) Maartje Goderie
