= Alejandra Gulla =

Argentine field hockey player

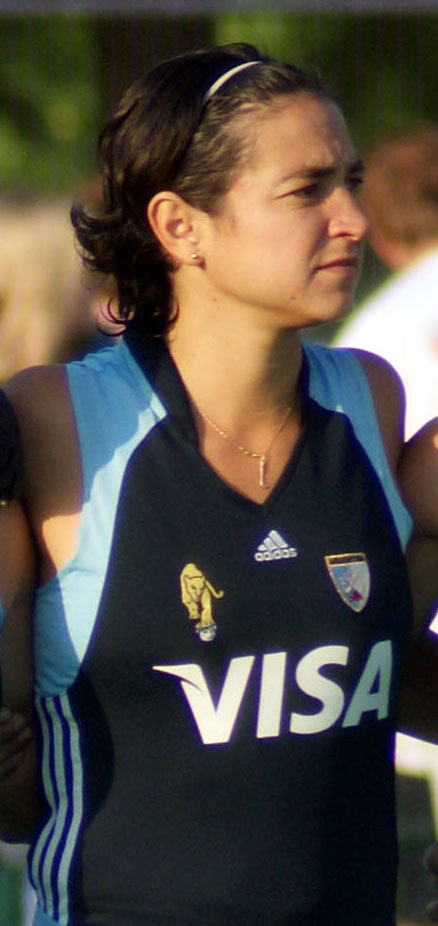

Medal record

Women's field hockey

Representing Argentina

Summer Olympics
Bronze medal – third place	2004 Athens	Team
Bronze medal – third place	2008 Beijing	Team

World Cup
Gold medal – first place	2010 Rosario	Team
Bronze medal – third place	2006 Madrid	Team

Pan American Games
Gold medal – first place	1999 Winnipeg	Team
Gold medal – first place	2003 Santo Domingo	Team
Gold medal – first place	2007 Rio de Janeiro	Team

Champions Trophy
Gold medal – first place	2001 Amstelveen	Team
Gold medal – first place	2008 Mönchengladbach	Team
Gold medal – first place	2009 Sydney	Team
Gold medal – first place	2010 Nottingham	Team
Bronze medal – third place	2004 Rosario	Team

Pan American Cup
Gold medal – first place	2001 Kingston	Team
Gold medal – first place	2004 Bridgetown	Team

Alejandra Laura Gulla (born July 4, 1977, in Lincoln, Buenos Aires) is a retired field hockey player from Argentina, who won the bronze medal with the national field hockey team at the 2004 Summer Olympics in Athens and at the 2008 Summer Olympics in Beijing. Gulla also won the 2010 World Cup, four Champions Trophies, and three Pan American Games. Gulla played club hockey for Lomas Athletic Club in Buenos Aires.
