= Claudia Burkart =

Argentine field hockey player (born 1980)

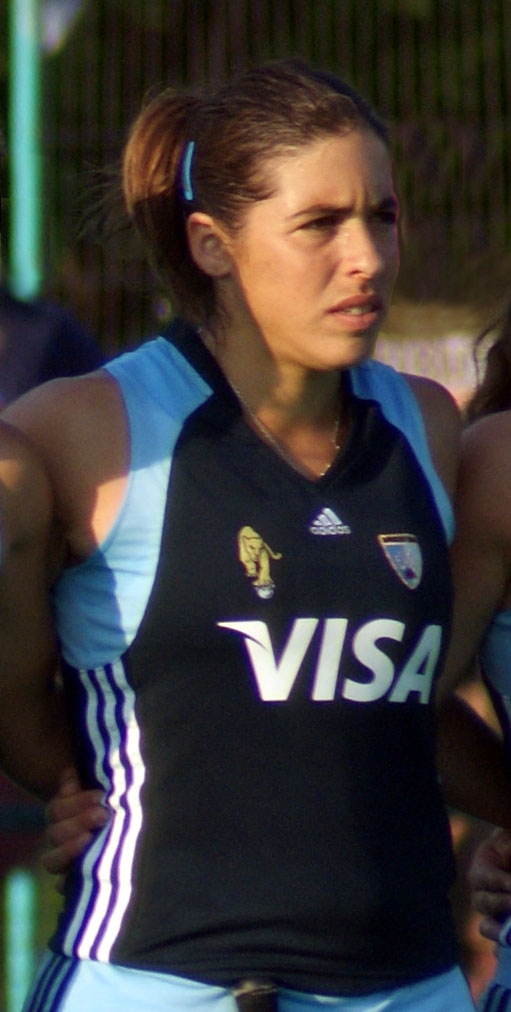

Personal information
- Full name: Claudia Inés Burkart
- Born: 22 February 1980 (age 46) Buenos Aires, Argentina
- Height: 1.65 m (5 ft 5 in)

Sport
- Sport: Field hockey
- Position: Defender
Senior career
Years	Team	Caps	Goals
–Present	Club Atlético San Isidro	-	-
National team
Years	Team	Caps	Goals
2001–2015	Argentina	113	-
Medal record
Women's field hockey
Representing Argentina
Summer Olympics
Bronze medal – third place	2004 Athens	Team
Bronze medal – third place	2008 Beijing	Team
World Cup
Gold medal – first place	2002 Perth	Team
Gold medal – first place	2010 Rosario	Team
Bronze medal – third place	2006 Madrid	Team
Pan American Games
Gold medal – first place	2003 Santo Domingo	Team
Gold medal – first place	2007 Rio de Janeiro	Team
Champions Trophy
Gold medal – first place	2001 Amstelveen	Team
Gold medal – first place	2008 Mönchengladbach	Team
Gold medal – first place	2009 Sydney	Team
Gold medal – first place	2010 Nottingham	Team
Silver medal – second place	2002 Macau	Team
Silver medal – second place	2007 Quilmes	Team
Bronze medal – third place	2004 Rosario	Team
Pan American Cup
Gold medal – first place	2001 Kingston	Team
Gold medal – first place	2004 Bridgetown	Team
- Updated on 8 September 2015

Claudia Inés Burkart (born 22 February 1980, in Buenos Aires) is an Argentine field hockey player who won the bronze medal with the national team at the 2004 Summer Olympics in Athens and at the 2008 Summer Olympics in Beijing. Claudia has also won two World Cups (2002, 2010), four Champions Trophy (2001, 2008, 2009, 2010), two gold medals at the Pan American Games (2003, 2007) and two Pan American Cups.

She first retired from the national team in 2010, but because of the big changes in the 2015 squad, Santiago Capurro called her in again to bring an experienced player to the team. Despite this, she was injured before competing for 2014–15 Women's FIH Hockey World League Final and was not able to compete.
