= Marilyn Agliotti =

South African field hockey player

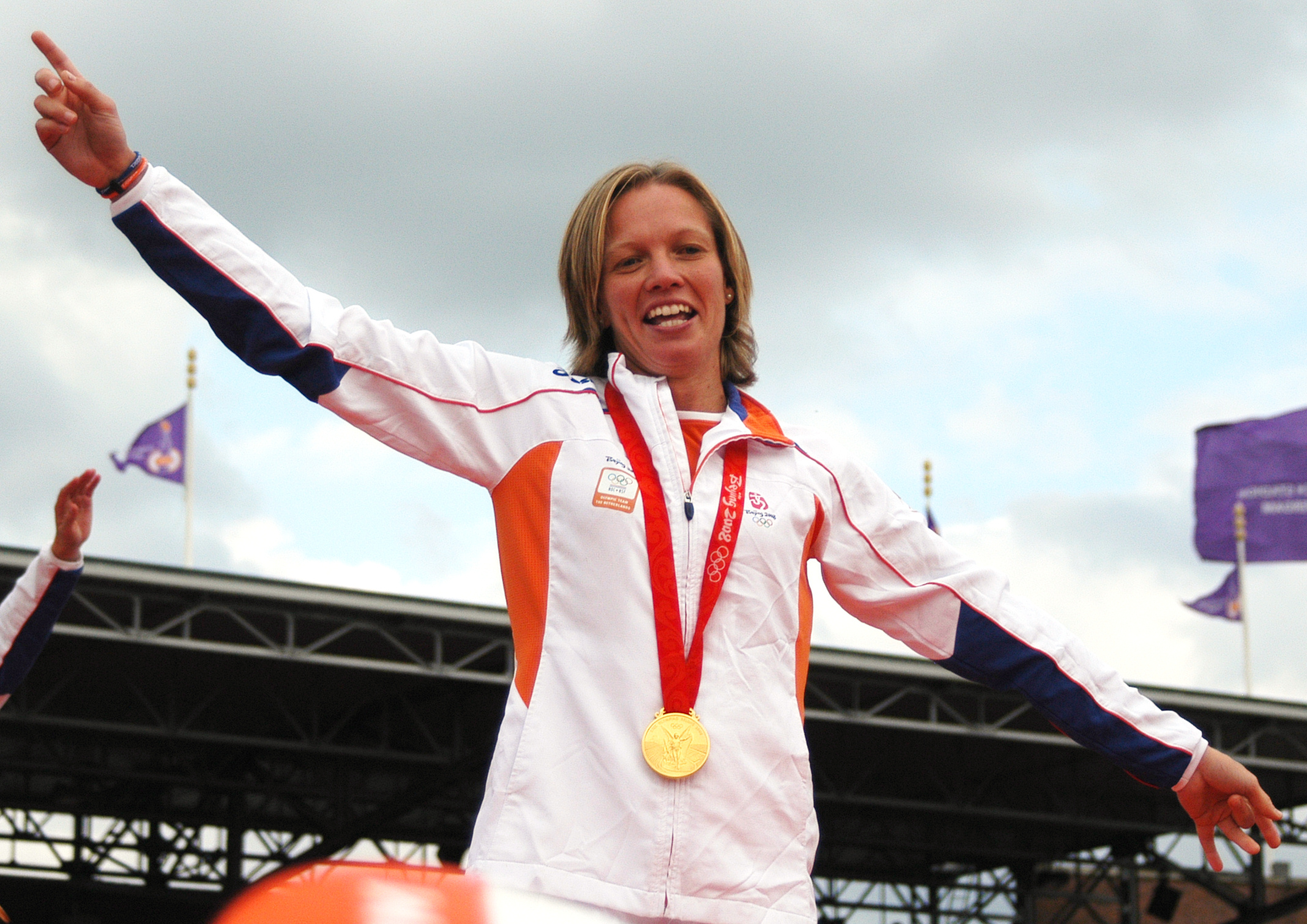

Personal information
- Born: 23 June 1979 (age 47) Boksburg, South Africa
- Height: 1.71 m (5 ft 7 1/2 in)
- Weight: 61 kg (134 lb)

Sport
- Country: Netherlands
- Sport: Hockey
- Turned pro: 1998
Medal record
Olympic Games
Gold medal – first place	2008 Beijing	Team competition
Gold medal – first place	2012 London	Team competition
World Cup
Silver medal – second place	2010 Rosario	Team competition
European Championship
Gold medal – first place	2011 Gladbach	Team competition
Silver medal – second place	2007 Manchester	Team competition
Champions Trophy
Bronze medal – third place	2008 M'gladbach	Team competition
Bronze medal – third place	2012 Rosario	Team competition
- Updated on 30 July 2012

Marilyn Agliotti (born 23 June 1979 in Boksburg, South Africa) is a field hockey player from the Netherlands, having previously represented South Africa in the sport. After her move to the Netherlands and award of a Dutch passport, she represented the Dutch national team.

She was selected for the 2007 European Championships in Manchester where the Dutch won the silver medal. They won the bronze medal at the 2008 Champions Trophy in Mönchengladbach. She was a member of the Dutch team that qualified for the 2008 Summer Olympics in Beijing, and won the gold medal in women's field hockey tournament. She was also a member of the Dutch team that won the gold medal at the 2012 Summer Olympics.

Agliotti ended her international career in November 2012 but continued to train with local team Oranje Zwart. Tribute was given to her at the 2013 Rabobank Hockey World League championships.
