= Sarah Thomas (field hockey) =

Welsh field hockey player

Personal information
- Nationality: British
- Born: Sarah Thomas; 12 January 1981 (age 45) Aberdare, Wales
- Height: 1.63 m (5 ft 4 in)
- Weight: 59 kg (130 lb)

Sport
- Country: United Kingdom
- Sport: Hockey
- Coached by: Jason Lee

Achievements and titles
- Olympic finals: 2008, 2012
- National finals: Commonwealth 2010
- Highest world ranking: Bronze Medal London 2012
Medal record
Olympic Games
Bronze medal – third place	2012 London	Team
Champions Trophy
Silver medal – second place	2012 Rosario	Team
European Challenge
Gold medal – first place	2007 Zagreb	Team
- Updated on 30 July 2012

Sarah Thomas (born 12 January 1981, in Aberdare) is a Welsh field hockey midfield and forward player, who was a member of the Wales and Great Britain women's field hockey team since making her GB debut in 1997. She was part of the team that won bronze at the 2012 Summer Olympics.

== Domestic career ==
Thomas played professionally for Dutch team HC Rotterdam for 8 seasons. She was voted the side's player of the season in 2007. She left the club in 2011 in order to return to the UK and focus on getting selected for the 2012 GB women's hockey squad.

== International career ==
Thomas represented Wales at all age groups from the under 16s up to and including the senior national side, whom she first played for in 1997. She subsequently captained the side at the 2010 Commonwealth Games. She was also a member of the GB women's hockey teams, winning 53 caps for the side. She was a member of the squad at both the 2008 Summer Olympics and the 2012 Summer Olympics, winning a bronze medal at the latter.

== Personal life ==
Thomas has a degree in exercise and sports sciences from the University of Exeter. Her dad Phil Thomas has written a book about her and her achievements called 'Tears to Cheers'.

== Retirement ==
Thomas retired from playing for Wales in 2010. She then retired from domestic hockey in 2011, and finally from all other international hockey in 2013, stating that she felt content with her career having finally won an Olympic medal.
