= María de la Paz Hernández =

Argentine field hockey player

Personal information
- Born: 11 January 1977 (age 49) Buenos Aires, Argentina
Medal record
Women's field hockey
Representing Argentina
Olympic Games
Silver medal – second place	2000 Sydney	Team
Bronze medal – third place	2004 Athens	Team
Bronze medal – third place	2008 Beijing	Team
World Cup
Gold medal – first place	2002 Perth	Team
Bronze medal – third place	2006 Madrid	Team
Champions Trophy
Gold medal – first place	2001 Amstelveen	Team
Gold medal – first place	2008 Mönchengladbach	Team
Silver medal – second place	2002 Macau	Team
Bronze medal – third place	2004 Rosario	Team
Pan American Games
Gold medal – first place	1999 Winnipeg	Team
Gold medal – first place	2003 Santo Domingo	Team
Pan American Cup
Gold medal – first place	2001 Kingston	Team

María "Maripi" de la Paz Hernández (born January 11, 1977, in Buenos Aires) is a retired field hockey player from Argentina, who won the silver medal with the national women's hockey team at the 2000 Summer Olympics in Sydney and bronze medal at both the 2004 Summer Olympics in Athens and 2008 Summer Olympics in Beijing. She was also a member of the Argentinian squad that won the World Cup in 2002 and two Champions Trophy tournaments (2001 and 2008). María de la Paz has also two Pan American Games (1999 and 2003) and the Pan American Cup in 2001. Her brother is the current Argentina rugby star Juan Martín Hernández.
