= Janine Beermann =

German field hockey player

Janine Beermann (born 20 November 1983 in Wuppertal) is a German field hockey player who competed in the 2008 Summer Olympics. She was also part of the Netherlands team that won the 2007 BDO Hockey Champions Trophy, women's title after defeating hosts Argentina.

She studied sports and social sciences at University of Wuppertal and currently works as a teacher at a high school in Velbert.
