= Keli Smith Puzo =

American field hockey player

Keli Smith Puzo (born January 25, 1979) is an American field hockey player. Smith Puzo is a two-time Olympian who competed in both the Beijing and London Olympic Games. At the 2008 Summer Olympics and 2012 Summer Olympics, she competed for the United States women's national field hockey team in the women's event. She grew up and attended grade school in Selinsgrove, Pennsylvania, and attended the University of Maryland, where she played for the Terrapins.
