= Angie Loy =

American field hockey player

Angie Loy (born April 23, 1982 in Loysville, Pennsylvania), also known as Angie Loy Reisinger, is a field hockey forward from Pennsylvania. S.

In 2008, she was a member of the U.S. Women's Field Hockey team at the Beijing Summer Olympics.

== Early life and education ==
Born in Loysville, Pennsylvania on April 23, 1982, Loy was raised in Perry County, Pennsylvania, where her parents owned and operated a dairy farm. She graduated from West Perry High School in Elliottsburg, where she had been a standout member of the girls' field hockey team during the late 1990s, By the time she was a senior in 1999, she had played field hockey for six years and was a multi-sport athlete who also played on her high school's basketball and track teams. Loy was involved in community service efforts with the school's Peer Helpers group and was a member of the National Honor Society.

Following her high school graduation, she attended Old Dominion University. She was awarded a full scholarship to the university.

== Career ==
A field hockey forward, Loy earned her first career cap versus Ireland on January 14, 2004 at Stanford, California.

=== 2008 Beijing Summer Olympics ===
In 2008, Loy was a member of the U.S. Women's Field Hockey team at the 2008 Summer Olympics in Beijing.

=== Coaching career ===
In September 2008, Loy worked as a volunteer assistant coach at Shippensburg University of Pennsylvania.

== International senior competitions ==
- 2004 – Pan American Cup, Bridgetown (2nd)
- 2004 – Olympic Qualifying Tournament, Auckland (6th)
- 2005 – Champions Challenge, Virginia Beach (5th)
- 2006 – World Cup Qualifier, Rome (4th)
- 2006 – World Cup, Madrid (6th)
- 2008 – 2008 Beijing Summer Olympics, Beijing (lead the US team in scoring (4 goals)

== Honors and other awards ==
On September 25, 2008, the West Perry High School Field Hockey team retired Loy's hockey jersey (#3), making her the first player to have her jersey retired by the field hockey team and only the fourth player ever to have a jersey retired by West Perry High School.

In 2009, Loy was inducted into the Pennsylvania Sports Hall of Fame.
