= Argentina at the 1988 Summer Olympics =

- IOC code: ARG
- NOC: Argentine Olympic Committee

in Seoul
- Competitors: 118 (93 men and 25 women) in 18 sports
- Flag bearer: Gabriela Sabatini
- Medals Ranked 35th: Gold 0 Silver 1 Bronze 1 Total 2

Summer Olympics appearances (overview)
- 1900; 1904; 1908; 1912; 1920; 1924; 1928; 1932; 1936; 1948; 1952; 1956; 1960; 1964; 1968; 1972; 1976; 1980; 1984; 1988; 1992; 1996; 2000; 2004; 2008; 2012; 2016; 2020; 2024; 2028

Argentina competed at the 1988 Summer Olympics in Seoul, South Korea. 118 competitors, 93 men and 25 women, took part in 53 events in 18 sports. The country claimed Olympic medals for the first time since 1972.

== Medalists ==
| Medal | Name | Sport | Event | Date |
|---|---|---|---|---|
| Silver | Gabriela Sabatini | Tennis | Women's singles | 1 October |
| Bronze | Argentina men's national volleyball team: Daniel Castellani; Daniel Colla; Hugo Conte; Juan Cuminetti; Esteban de Palma; Alejandro Diz; Waldo Kantor; Esteban Martínez; Raúl Quiroga; Jon Uriarte; Javier Weber; Claudio Zulianello | Volleyball | Men's competition | 2 October |

== Competitors ==
The following is the list of number of competitors in the Games.

| Sport | Men | Women | Total |
|---|---|---|---|
| Archery | 2 | 0 | 2 |
| Athletics | 2 | 0 | 2 |
| Boxing | 4 | – | 4 |
| Canoeing | 5 | 2 | 7 |
| Cycling | 7 | 0 | 7 |
| Diving | 0 | 1 | 1 |
| Fencing | 2 | 0 | 2 |
| Field hockey | 16 | 16 | 32 |
| Football | 16 | – | 16 |
| Judo | 3 | – | 3 |
| Rowing | 6 | 0 | 6 |
| Sailing | 11 | 0 | 11 |
| Shooting | 3 | 0 | 3 |
| Swimming | 0 | 2 | 2 |
| Table tennis | 0 | 1 | 1 |
| Tennis | 2 | 3 | 5 |
| Volleyball | 12 | 0 | 12 |
| Wrestling | 2 | – | 2 |
| Total | 93 | 25 | 118 |

== Archery ==
| Athlete | Event | Ranking round | | Round of 24 | | Quarterfinals | | Semifinals | | Finals | |
| Athlete | Event | Score | Rank | Score | Rank | Score | Rank | Score | Rank | Score | Rank |
|---|---|---|---|---|---|---|---|---|---|---|---|
| Angel Bello | Men's individual | 1017 | 81 | did not advance | | | | | | | 81 |
| Claudio Pafundi | Men's individual | 1126 | 75 | did not advance | | | | | | | 75 |

== Athletics ==
| Athlete | Events | Heat | | Final | |
| Athlete | Events | Result | Rank | Result | Rank |
|---|---|---|---|---|---|
| Fernando Pastoriza | Men's high jump | 2.10 | 26 | did not advance | |
| Andrés Charadia | Men's hammer | 68.26 | 25 | did not advance | |

== Boxing ==
| Athlete | Event | Round of 64 | Round of 32 | Round of 16 | Quarterfinals | Semifinals | Final | |
| Athlete | Event | Opposition Result | Opposition Result | Opposition Result | Opposition Result | Opposition Result | Opposition Result | Rank |
|---|---|---|---|---|---|---|---|---|
| Carlos Eluaiza | Light flyweight | Bye | Makhmutov (URS); L 0–5 | did not advance | | | | |
| Domingo Damigella | Featherweight | Anderson (GBR); L 1–4 | did not advance | | | | | |
| Jorge Oscar López | Light middleweight | N/A | Bye | Heydeck (GDR); L 0–5 | did not advance | | | |

== Canoeing ==
=== Flatwater ===
Men

| Athlete | Event | Heats | | Repechage | | Semifinals | | Final | |
| Athlete | Event | Time | Rank | Time | Rank | Time | Rank | Time | Rank |
|---|---|---|---|---|---|---|---|---|---|
| Atilio Vásquez | Men's K-1 1000 m | 4:01.35 | 6 | 3:58.03 | 4 Q | 3:58.03 | 4 | did not advance | |
| Gustavo Cirillo; José Luis Marello | K-2 500 m | 1:52.42 | 7 | 1:46.98 | 6 | did not advance | | | |
| Gustavo Cirillo; José Luis Marello; Fernando Chaparro; Norberto Méndez | K-4 1000 m | 3:23.33 | 5 | 3:24.16 | 4 | did not advance | | | |

Women

| Athlete | Event | Heats | | Repechage | | Semifinals | | Final | |
| Athlete | Event | Time | Rank | Time | Rank | Time | Rank | Time | Rank |
|---|---|---|---|---|---|---|---|---|---|
| María Miliauro | K-1 500 m | 2:12.32 | 6 | N/A | | 2:11.07 | 4 | did not advance | |
| Corina Martín; Verónica Arbo | K-2 500 m | 1:59.38 | 8 | 2:04.72 | 5 | did not advance | | | |

== Cycling ==
=== Track ===
Sprints

| Athlete | Event | Qualifying | | 1/16 finals (repechage) | | 1/8 finals (repechage) | Quarterfinals | Semifinals | Finals | |
| Athlete | Event | Time | Rank | Time | Rank | Time Speed (km/h) | Time Speed (km/h) | Time Speed (km/h) | Time Speed (km/h) | Rank |
|---|---|---|---|---|---|---|---|---|---|---|
| Gustavo Faris | Men's sprint | 11.187 | 15 Q | | 3; 2 | did not advance | | | | |
| Marcelo Alexandre | Men's time trial | N/A | | | | | | | 1:06.925; 53.791 | 13 |

Pursuits

| Athlete | Event | Qualifying | | 1st round | | Semifinals | | Finals | |
| Athlete | Event | Time | Rank | Opposition time | Rank | Opposition time | Rank | Opposition time | Rank |
|---|---|---|---|---|---|---|---|---|---|
| Gabriel Curuchet | Men's individual pursuit | 4:47.18 | 12 | Dawidowicz (POL); 4:50.75 | 13 | Did not advance | | | |
| Gabriel Curuchet; Jorge Gaday; Sergio Llamazares; Rubén Priede | Men's team pursuit | 4:29.90 | 17 | Did not advance | | | | | |

Points races

| Athlete | Event | Qualifying | | Finals | |
| Athlete | Event | Points | Rank | Points | Rank |
|---|---|---|---|---|---|
| Juan Curuchet | Men's points race | 11 (same lap) | 5 Q | 18 (–1 lap) | 5 |

== Diving ==
| Athlete | Events | Preliminary | | Final | |
| Athlete | Events | Points | Rank | Points | Rank |
|---|---|---|---|---|---|
| Verónica Ribot | Women's platform | 377.70 | 8 Q | 297.18 | 12 |
| Verónica Ribot | Women's springboard | 405.87 | 14 | did not advance | |

== Fencing ==
| Athlete | Event | Preliminary round 1 | | Preliminary round 2 | | Preliminary round 3 | | Round of 32 | Round of 16 | Quarterfinals | Semifinals | Final |
| Athlete | Event | W–L record | Group rank | W–L record | Overall rank | W–L record | Overall rank | Opposition Result | Opposition Result | Opposition Result | Opposition Result | Opposition Result |
|---|---|---|---|---|---|---|---|---|---|---|---|---|
| Sergio Turiace | Men's foil | 1–3 | 4 Q | 2–3 | 24 Q | 0–4 | 39 | did not advance | | | | |
| Sergio Turiace | Men's individual épée | 2–2 | 3 Q | 0–4 | 57 | did not advance | | | | | | |
| Rafael di Tella | Men's individual épée | 3–1 | 3 Q | 1–4 | 43 Q | 1–5 | 41 | did not advance | | | | |

== Field hockey ==
=== Men ===
Team roster and tournament statistics

Coach: Luis Ciancia

| No. | Player | GP | G | S | FG | PC | PS | Green card | Yellow card | Red card |
|---|---|---|---|---|---|---|---|---|---|---|
| 1 | Otto Schmitt (GK) | 4 | 0 | | | | | | | |
| 2 | Alejandro Siri | 7 | 0 | | | | | | | |
| 3 | Miguel Altube | 7 | 0 | | | | | | | |
| 4 | Marcelo Mascheroni | 7 | 3 | | | 3 | | | | |
| 5 | Marcelo Garraffo | 6 | 1 | | | 1 | | | | |
| 6 | Edgardo Pailos | 7 | 1 | | 1 | | | | | |
| 7 | Alejandro Doherty | 6 | 0 | | | | | | | |
| 8 | Aldo Ayala | 7 | 0 | | | | | | | |
| 9 | Carlos Geneyro | 7 | 4 | | | 3 | 1 | | | |
| 10 | Gabriel Minadeo | 7 | 1 | | 1 | | | | | |
| 11 | Alejandro Verga | 7 | 2 | | 2 | | | | | |
| 12 | Fernando Ferrara | 7 | 3 | | 2 | 1 | | | | |
| 13 | Emanuel Roggero | 5 | 0 | | | | | | | |
| 14 | Franco Nicola | 5 | 0 | | | | | | | |
| 15 | Martín Sordelli | 6 | 0 | | | | | | | |
| 16 | Mariano Silva | 1 | 0 | | | | | | | |
| Team totals | | 7 | 15 | 70 | 6 | 8 | 1 | 11 | 2 | |

Legend: GP – Games played; G – Goals; S – Shots; FG – Field Goals; PC – Penalty Corners; PS – Penalty Strokes; Green Cards; (yellow card) Yellow Cards; (red card) Red Cards

Preliminary Round (Pool A)

| Team | Pld | W | D | L | GF | GA | Pts |
|---|---|---|---|---|---|---|---|
| Australia | 5 | 5 | 0 | 0 | 19 | 3 | 10 |
| Netherlands | 5 | 3 | 1 | 1 | 12 | 6 | 7 |
| Pakistan | 5 | 3 | 0 | 2 | 15 | 8 | 6 |
| Argentina | 5 | 2 | 0 | 3 | 8 | 12 | 4 |
| Spain | 5 | 1 | 1 | 3 | 6 | 10 | 3 |
| Kenya | 5 | 0 | 0 | 5 | 5 | 26 | 0 |

Qualified for semifinals

September 18

| Netherlands | 5 – 1 | Argentina |

September 20

| Australia | 4 – 0 | Argentina |

September 22

| Pakistan | 2 – 1 | Argentina |

September 24

| Argentina | 1 – 0 | Spain |

September 26

| Argentina | 5 – 1 | Kenya |

5th to 8th place classification

September 28

| India | 6 – 6 (AET) 4 – 3 (PSO) | Argentina |

7th place match

September 30

| Soviet Union | 4 – 1 | Argentina |

=== Women ===
Team roster and tournament statistics

Coach: Miguel MacCormick

| No. | Player | GP | G | S | FG | PC | PS | Green card | Yellow card | Red card |
|---|---|---|---|---|---|---|---|---|---|---|
| 1 | Laura Mulhall (GK) | 5 | 0 | | | | | | | |
| 2 | María Colombo | 5 | 1 | | | 1 | | | | |
| 3 | Marisa López | 5 | 0 | | | | | | | |
| 4 | María Alejandra Tucat | 5 | 0 | | | | | | | |
| 5 | Victoria Carbó | 5 | 1 | | | 1 | | | | |
| 6 | Marcela Richezza | 5 | 0 | | | | | | | |
| 7 | Gabriela Liz | 5 | 0 | | | | | | | |
| 8 | Gabriela Sánchez | 5 | 0 | | | | | | | |
| 9 | Moira Brinnand | 5 | 1 | | 1 | | | | | |
| 10 | Marcela Hussey | 5 | 1 | | 1 | | | | | |
| 11 | Alejandra Palma | 5 | 2 | | 1 | | 1 | | | |
| 12 | Laura Ormaechea | 0 | 0 | | | | | | | |
| 13 | María Bengochea | 4 | 0 | | | | | | | |
| 14 | Alina Vergara | 1 | 0 | | | | | | | |
| 15 | María Gabriela Pazos | 3 | 0 | | | | | | | |
| 16 | Andrea Fioroni | 1 | 0 | | | | | | | |
| Team totals | | 6 | 6 | 38 | 3 | 2 | 1 | 3 | | |

Legend: GP – Games played; G – Goals; S – Shots; FG – Field goals; PC – Penalty corners; PS – Penalty strokes; Green cards; (yellow card) Yellow cards; (red card) Red cards

Preliminary round (Pool A)

| Team | Pld | W | D | L | GF | GA | Pts |
|---|---|---|---|---|---|---|---|
| Netherlands | 3 | 3 | 0 | 0 | 9 | 2 | 6 |
| Great Britain | 3 | 1 | 1 | 1 | 4 | 7 | 3 |
| Argentina | 3 | 1 | 0 | 2 | 2 | 3 | 2 |
| United States | 3 | 0 | 1 | 2 | 4 | 7 | 1 |

Qualified for semifinals

September 21

| Argentina | 0 – 1 | Great Britain |

September 23

| Argentina | 2 – 1 | United States |

September 25

| Netherlands | 1 – 0 | Argentina |

5th to 8th place classification

September 27

| Argentina | 1 – 3 | Canada |

7th place match

September 29

| United States | 1 – 3 (AET) | Argentina |

== Football ==
Squad
Matches played in parentheses denotes player came from the bench

| # | Name | Club | Date of Birth | Pld | Goals | Y (yellow card) | Y/R (yellow card) (yellow-red card) | R (red card) |
Goalkeepers
| 1 | Luis Islas | (Argentina) Independiente | December 22, 1965 (aged 22) | 4 | 0 | 0 | 0 | 0 |
| 12 | Fabián Cancelarich | (Argentina) Ferro Carril Oeste | December 30, 1965 (aged 22) | 0 | 0 | 0 | 0 | 0 |
Defenders
| 2 | Rubén Agüero | (Argentina) Estudiantes de La Plata | February 20, 1960 (aged 28) | 2 | 0 | 0 | 0 | 0 |
| 5 | Alberto Boggio | (Argentina) Rosario Central | August 14, 1969 (aged 19) | 0 | 0 | 0 | 0 | 0 |
| 8 | Hernán Díaz | (Argentina) Rosario Central | February 26, 1965 (aged 23) | 4 | 0 | 0 | 0 | 0 |
| 9 | Néstor Fabbri | (Argentina) Racing Club | April 29, 1968 (aged 20) | 4 | 1 | 0 | 0 | 0 |
| 11 | Néstor Lorenzo | (Argentina) Argentinos Juniors | February 28, 1966 (aged 22) | 4 | 0 | 0 | 0 | 0 |
| 13 | Mario Lucca | (Argentina) Vélez Sársfield | August 6, 1961 (aged 27) | 3(1) | 0 | 1 | 0 | 0 |
| 14 | Carlos Mayor | (Argentina) Vélez Sársfield | May 10, 1965 (aged 23) | 1(1) | 0 | 1 | 0 | 0 |
| 14 | Pedro Monzón | (Argentina) Independiente | February 23, 1962 (aged 26) | 2(1) | 0 | 0 | 0 | 0 |
Midfielders
| 6 | Claudio Cabrera | (Argentina) Vélez Sársfield | November 20, 1963 (aged 24) | 1(1) | 0 | 0 | 0 | 0 |
| 10 | Daniel Hernández | (Argentina) Independiente | February 5, 1970 (aged 18) | 0 | 0 | 0 | 0 | 0 |
| 16 | Hugo Pérez | (Argentina) Racing Club | October 6, 1968 (aged 19) | 4 | 0 | 1 | 0 | 0 |
| 17 | Alejandro Ruidiaz | (Argentina) Independiente | April 15, 1981 (aged 7) | 1 | 0 | 0 | 0 | 0 |
Forwards
| 3 | Mauro Airez | (Argentina) Gimnasia y Esgrima (La Plata) | October 26, 1968 (aged 19) | 2(1) | 0 | 0 | 0 | 0 |
| 4 | Carlos Alfaro Moreno | (Argentina) Platense | October 18, 1964 (aged 23) | 4 | 3 | 0 | 0 | 0 |
| 7 | Jorge Comas | (Argentina) Boca Juniors | June 9, 1960 (aged 28) | 4 | 0 | 0 | 0 | 0 |
| 18 | Alejandro Russo | (Argentina) Estudiantes de La Plata | February 13, 1968 (aged 20) | (2) | 0 | 0 | 0 | 0 |
| 19 | Darío Siviski | (Argentina) San Lorenzo | December 20, 1962 (aged 25) | 4 | 0 | 0 | 0 | 0 |
Coach
| | (Argentina) Carlos Pachamé | | February 25, 1944 (aged 44) |

Results

Preliminaries

September 18, 1988
19:00

| United States | 1–1 | Argentina |
|---|---|---|
| Windischmann 78' | (Report) | Alfaro Moreno 83' (pen.) |

Daegu Civic Stadium, Daegu
Attendance: 18,500
Referee: Jamal Al Sharif (Syria)

September 20, 1988
19:00

| Soviet Union | 2–1 | Argentina |
|---|---|---|
| Dobrovolski 7'; Mikhailichenko 22' | (Report) | Alfaro Moreno 77' (pen.) |

Daegu Civic Stadium, Daegu
Attendance: 25,000
Referee: Gérard Biguet (France)

September 22, 1988
17:00

| South Korea | 1–2 | Argentina |
|---|---|---|
| Noh 14' | (Report) | Alfaro Moreno 3'; Nestor Fabbri 73' |

Busan Gudeok Stadium, Busan
Attendance: 30,000
Referee: Christopher Bambridge (Australia)

Group C
| Pos | Team | Pld | W | D | L | GF | GA | GD | Pts | Qualification |
|---|---|---|---|---|---|---|---|---|---|---|
| 1 | Soviet Union | 3 | 2 | 1 | 0 | 6 | 3 | +3 | 5 | Qualified for quarterfinals |
| 2 | Argentina | 3 | 1 | 1 | 1 | 4 | 4 | 0 | 3 | Qualified for quarterfinals |
| 3 | South Korea (H) | 3 | 0 | 2 | 1 | 1 | 2 | −1 | 2 | |
| 4 | United States | 3 | 0 | 2 | 1 | 3 | 5 | −2 | 2 | |

Source: FIFA
(H) Hosts

Quarterfinals

September 25, 1988
19:00

| Brazil | 1–0 | Argentina |
|---|---|---|
| Silva 76' | (Report) |

Olympic Stadium, Seoul
Attendance: 21,800
Referee: Kurt Röthlisberger (Switzerland)

== Judo ==
| Athlete | Event | Round 1 | Round 2 | Round 3 | Quarterfinals | Semifinals | Final | Repechage 1 | Repechage 2 | Repechage 3 | Bronze |
| Athlete | Event | Opposition Result | Opposition Result | Opposition Result | Opposition Result | Opposition Result | Opposition Result | Opposition Result | Opposition Result | Opposition Result | Opposition Result |
|---|---|---|---|---|---|---|---|---|---|---|---|
| Claudio Yafuso | Men's -65 kg | Anderson (GUM); W 1000–0000 | Yolci (TUR); W 0001–0000 | Lee (KOR); L 0000–0210 | did not advance | | | Bečanović (YUG); W 0100–0021 | Carabetta (FRA); L 0000–1000 | did not advance | |
| Dario García | Men's -78 kg | Attyé (SEN); W 1000–0000 | Legień (POL); L 0000–1000 | did not advance | | | | Hussein (EGY); W 0200–0000 | Doherty (CAN); L (Chui) | did not advance | |
| Sandro López | Men's -86 kg | Bye | White (GBR); L 0001–0010 | did not advance | | | | | | | |

Key

- Chui – Penalty that equals the loss of five points

== Rowing ==
| Athlete(s) | Event | Heats | | Repechage | | Semifinals | | Final | |
| Athlete(s) | Event | Time | Rank | Time | Rank | Time | Rank | Time | Rank |
|---|---|---|---|---|---|---|---|---|---|
| Claudio Águila, Daniel Scuri | Men's coxless pair | 6:59.05 | 5 | 7:06.57 | 4 | did not advance | | | |
| Rubén D'Andrilli, Marcelo Fernández, Sergio Fernández González, Claudio Guindón | Men's quadruple sculls | 6:04.77 | 4 | 5:58.27 | 3 Q | 5:57.56 | 5 | did not advance | |

== Sailing ==
| Athlete | Event | Race | | | | | | | Score | Rank |
| Athlete | Event | 1 | 2 | 3 | 4 | 5 | 6 | 7 | Score | Rank |
|---|---|---|---|---|---|---|---|---|---|---|
| Gonzalo Campero | Finn | 26.0 | 29.0 | 13.0 | (40.0); RET | 19.0 | 14.0 | 22.0 | 123.0 | 17 |
| Jorge García Velazco | Division II | 11.7 | 17.0 | 5.7 | (18.0) | 11.7 | 8.0 | 16.0 | 70.1 | 7 |
| Fernando García Guevara, Diego Minguens | Tornado | 30.0; RET | 27.0 | 22.0 | 30.0; RET | 30.0; DNC | 30.0; DNC | 30.0; DNC | 169.0 | 23 |
| Carlos Irigoyen, Guillermo Parada | Men's 470 | 23.0 | 27.0 | (29.0) | 28.0 | 22.0 | 21.0 | 19.0 | 140.0 | 19 |
| Julio Labandeira, Alberto Zanetti | Star | 21.0 | (22.0) | 21.0 | 16.0 | 21.0 | 19.0 | 21.0 | 119.0 | 16 |
| Pedro Ferrero, Raúl Lena, Santiago Lange | Soling | (21.0) | 19.0 | 0.0 | 14.0 | 14.0 | 17.0 | 18.0 | 82.0 | 9 |

Key

- RET – Retired
- DNC – Did not compete

== Shooting ==
| Athlete | Event | Qualification | | Semifinal | | Final | | Rank |
| Athlete | Event | Score | Rank | Score | Rank | Score | Total | Rank |
|---|---|---|---|---|---|---|---|---|
| Julio César Iemma | Men's 50 m rifle prone | 590 | 41 | N/A | | did not advance | | 41 |
| Firmo Roberti | Skeet | 147 | 9 Q | 49 | 8 | did not advance | | 8 |
| Lisandro Sugezky | Men's 10 m air pistol | 572 | 31 | N/A | | did not advance | | 31 |
| Lisandro Sugezky | Men's 50 m pistol | 539 | 40 | N/A | | did not advance | | 40 |

== Swimming ==
| Athlete | Events | Heat | | Final | |
| Athlete | Events | Time | Rank | Time | Rank |
|---|---|---|---|---|---|
| Valentina Aracil | Women's 100 m breaststroke | 1:19.60 | 37 | did not advance | |
| Valentina Aracil | Women's 200 m breaststroke | – | DSQ | did not advance | |
| Valentina Aracil | Women's 200 m medley | 2:31.53 | 30 | did not advance | |
| Valentina Aracil | Women's 400 m medley | 5:19.17 | 28 | did not advance | |
| Alicia Boscatto | Women's 100 m breaststroke | 1:15.67 | 33 | did not advance | |
| Alicia Boscatto | Women's 200 m breaststroke | 2:45.80 | 39 | did not advance | |

Key

- DSQ – Disqualified

== Table tennis ==
| Athlete | Event | Preliminary round | Round of 16 | Quarterfinals | Semifinals | Final |
| Athlete | Event | Opposition Result | Opposition Result | Opposition Result | Opposition Result | Opposition Result |
|---|---|---|---|---|---|---|
| Hae-Ja Kim | Women's singles | Vriesekoop (NED); L 0–3; Guergueltcheva (BUL); L 0–3; Safarova (TCH); L 0–3; Perkučin (YUG); L 0–3; Meshref (EGY); W 3–1 | did not advance | | | |

== Tennis ==
| Athlete | Event | Round of 64 | Round of 32 | Round of 16 | Quarterfinals | Semifinals | Final | |
| Athlete | Event | Opposition Score | Opposition Score | Opposition Score | Opposition Score | Opposition Score | Opposition Score | Rank |
|---|---|---|---|---|---|---|---|---|
| Javier Frana | Men's singles | Perkiss (ISR); W 6–2, 4–6, 6–4, 6–4 | Jaite (ARG); L 2–6, 4–6, 2–6 | did not advance | | | | =17 |
| Martín Jaite | Singles | Pridham (CAN); W 6–1, 6–3, 6–2 | Frana (ARG); W 6–2, 6–4, 6–2 | Kim (KOR); W 6–4, 6–1, 6–3 | Gilbert (USA); L 7–5, 1–6, 6–7^{(1–7)}, 3–6 | did not advance | | =5 |
| Javier Frana, Martín Jaite | Men's doubles | N/A | Derlin (AUS); Evernden (AUS); L 4–6, 1–4 (retired) | did not advance | | | | =17 |
| Bettina Fulco | Women's singles | Paulus (AUT); L 6–7^{(5–7)}, 4–6 | did not advance | | | | | =33 |
| Mercedes Paz | Women's singles | Tsarbopoulou (GRE); W 7–6^{(9–7)}, 6–3 | Maleeva (BUL); L 1–6, 2–6 | did not advance | | | | =17 |
| Gabriela Sabatini | Women's singles | Bye | Goleš (YUG); W 6–1, 6–0 | Hanika (FRG); W 1–6, 6–4, 6–2 | Zvereva (URS); W 6–4, 6–3 | Maleeva (BUL); W 6–1, 6–2 | Graf (FRG); L 3–6, 3–6 | Silver |
| Mercedes Paz, Gabriela Sabatini | Women's doubles | N/A | Bassett-Seguso (CAN); Hetherington (CAN); L 6–7^{(8–10)}, 7–5, (18–20) | did not advance | | | | =9 |

== Volleyball ==
Roster

Coach: Luis Muchaga

| No. | Name | Date of birth | Height | Weight |
|---|---|---|---|---|
| 1 | Claudio Zulianello | 29 May 1965 | 1.98 m (6 ft 6 in) | 91 kg (201 lb) |
| 2 | Daniel Castellani (c) | 21 March 1961 | 1.95 m (6 ft 5 in) | 83 kg (183 lb) |
| 3 | Esteban Martínez | 25 September 1961 | 1.91 m (6 ft 3 in) | 87 kg (192 lb) |
| 4 | Alejandro Diz | 26 March 1965 | 1.96 m (6 ft 5 in) | 90 kg (200 lb) |
| 5 | Daniel Colla | 23 February 1964 | 1.95 m (6 ft 5 in) | 80 kg (180 lb) |
| 6 | Javier Weber | 6 January 1966 | 1.80 m (5 ft 11 in) | 77 kg (170 lb) |
| 7 | Hugo Conte | 14 April 1963 | 1.97 m (6 ft 6 in) | 90 kg (200 lb) |
| 8 | Waldo Kantor | 11 January 1960 | 1.78 m (5 ft 10 in) | 74 kg (163 lb) |
| 9 | Raúl Quiroga | 26 January 1962 | 1.97 m (6 ft 6 in) | 93 kg (205 lb) |
| 10 | Jon Uriarte | 15 October 1961 | 1.99 m (6 ft 6 in) | 91 kg (201 lb) |
| 11 | Esteban de Palma | 18 January 1967 | 1.96 m (6 ft 5 in) | 90 kg (200 lb) |
| 12 | Juan Cuminetti | 27 May 1967 | 1.99 m (6 ft 6 in) | 86 kg (190 lb) |

Group play

| Pos | Team | Pld | W | L | Pts | SW | SL | SR | SPW | SPL | SPR | Qualification |
|---|---|---|---|---|---|---|---|---|---|---|---|---|
| 1 | United States | 5 | 5 | 0 | 10 | 15 | 3 | 5.000 | 263 | 155 | 1.697 | Semifinals |
| 2 | Argentina | 5 | 3 | 2 | 8 | 11 | 7 | 1.571 | 219 | 211 | 1.038 | Semifinals |
| 3 | France | 5 | 3 | 2 | 8 | 10 | 7 | 1.429 | 222 | 190 | 1.168 | 5th–8th semifinals |
| 4 | Netherlands | 5 | 3 | 2 | 8 | 10 | 7 | 1.429 | 202 | 183 | 1.104 | 5th–8th semifinals |
| 5 | Japan | 5 | 1 | 4 | 6 | 5 | 12 | 0.417 | 182 | 225 | 0.809 | 9th–12th semifinals |
| 6 | Tunisia | 5 | 0 | 5 | 5 | 0 | 15 | 0.000 | 101 | 225 | 0.449 | 9th–12th semifinals |

| September 18, 1988; 14:00 | Tunisia | 0–3 | Argentina | Referees: Cho Young-Ho (South Korea), Surev Stepanian (Soviet Union) |
| September 18, 1988; 14:00 | (5–15, 11–15, 6–15) | | | Referees: Cho Young-Ho (South Korea), Surev Stepanian (Soviet Union) |

| September 19, 1988 | Japan | 1–3 | Argentina | Referees: Stoyan Stoyanov (Bulgaria), Ahmed Hassan (Egypt) |
| September 19, 1988 | (11–15, 12–15, 15–11, 11–15) | | | Referees: Stoyan Stoyanov (Bulgaria), Ahmed Hassan (Egypt) |

| September 22, 1988 | United States | 3–2 | Argentina | Referees: Ramis Samedov (Soviet Union), Sigmund Dawiskibas (Sweden) |
| September 22, 1988 | (11–15, 11–15, 15–4, 17–15, 15–7) | | | Referees: Ramis Samedov (Soviet Union), Sigmund Dawiskibas (Sweden) |

| September 24, 1988 | Argentina | 3–0 | Netherlands | Referees: Kim Young-Dae (South Korea), Ahmed Hassan (Egypt) |
| September 24, 1988 | (15–11, 15–7, 15–8) | | | Referees: Kim Young-Dae (South Korea), Ahmed Hassan (Egypt) |

| September 26, 1988 | France | 3–0 | Argentina | Referees: Cho Young-Ho (South Korea), Abdelmajid Djeran (Tunisia) |
| September 26, 1988 | (15–7, 15–5, 15–5) | | | Referees: Cho Young-Ho (South Korea), Abdelmajid Djeran (Tunisia) |

Semifinal

| September 30, 1988 | Soviet Union | 3–0 | Argentina | Referees: Cho Young-Ho (South Korea), Ahmed Hassan (Egypt) |
| September 30, 1988 | (15–11, 17–15, 15–8) | | | Referees: Cho Young-Ho (South Korea), Ahmed Hassan (Egypt) |

Bronze medal match

| September 30, 1988 | Argentina | 3–2 | Brazil | Referees: Vladimir Kovalik (Czechoslovakia), Torres Genard Arredondo (Mexico) |
| September 30, 1988 | (15–10, 15–17, 15–8, 12–15, 15–9) | | | Referees: Vladimir Kovalik (Czechoslovakia), Torres Genard Arredondo (Mexico) |

Won Bronze Medal

== Wrestling ==
| Athlete | Event | Preliminary round | Final |
| Athlete | Event | Opposition Result | Opposition Result |
|---|---|---|---|
| Daniel Iglesias | Men's freestyle 82 kg | Jarju (RSA); L Hussein (EGY); W Lohyňa (TCH); L | Did not advance |
| Daniel Iglesias | Men's Greco-Roman 82 kg | Kim (KOR); L Mukai (JPN); L | Did not advance |
| Daniel Navarrete | Men's freestyle 68 kg | Brown (AUS); L Al-Masri (JOR); W Park (KOR); L | Did not advance |
| Daniel Navarrete | Men's Greco-Roman 68 kg | Barcia (ESP); L Hidalgo (PAN); L | Did not advance |

== See also ==
- Argentina at the 1987 Pan American Games
