= List of Olympic medalists for Argentina =

This is a list of Argentine medalists at the Summer and Winter Olympics. For more information about Argentine participation at the Olympic Games, see Argentina at the Olympics.

== Olympic Medalists ==
Medal	Name(s)	Games	Sport	Event
Gold	Argentina national polo team: Arturo Kenny; Juan Miles; Guillermo Naylor; Juan Nelson; Enrique Padilla	1924 Paris	Polo	Men's tournament
Silver	Luis Brunetto	1924 Paris	Athletics	Men's triple jump
Silver	Alfredo Copello	1924 Paris	Boxing	Men's lightweight
Silver	Héctor Méndez	1924 Paris	Boxing	Men's welterweight
Bronze	Pedro Quartucci	1924 Paris	Boxing	Men's featherweight
Bronze	Alfredo Porzio	1924 Paris	Boxing	Men's heavyweight
Gold	Alberto Zorrilla	1928 Amsterdam	Swimming	Men's 400 m freestyle
Gold	Víctor Avendaño	1928 Amsterdam	Boxing	Men's light heavyweight7
Gold	Arturo Rodríguez	1928 Amsterdam	Boxing	Men's heavyweight
Silver	Víctor Peralta	1928 Amsterdam	Boxing	Men's featherweight
Silver	Raúl Landini	1928 Amsterdam	Boxing	Men's welterweight
Silver	Argentina national football team: Ludovico Bidoglio; Ángel Bossio; Saúl Calandra; Alfredo Carricaberry; Roberto Cherro; Octavio Díaz; Juan Evaristo; Manuel Ferreira; Enrique Gainzarain; Alfredo Helman; Segundo Luna; Ángel Medici; Luis Monti; Pedro Ochoa; Rodolfo Orlandini; Raimundo Orsi; Fernando Paternoster; Feliciano Perducca; Natalio Perinetti; Domingo Tarasconi; Luis Weihmuller; Adolfo Zumelzú	1928 Amsterdam	Football	Men's tournament
Bronze	Raúl Anganuzzi, Carmelo Camet, Roberto Larraz, Héctor Lucchetti, Luis Lucchetti	1928 Amsterdam	Fencing	Men's team foil
Gold	Juan Carlos Zabala	1932 Los Angeles	Athletics	Men's Marathon
Gold	Carmelo Robledo	1932 Los Angeles	Boxing	Men's Featherweight
Gold	Santiago Lovell	1932 Los Angeles	Boxing	Men's Heavyweight
Silver	Amado Azar	1932 Los Angeles	Boxing	Men's Middleweight
Gold	Oscar Casanovas	1936 Berlin	Boxing	Men's Featherweight
Gold	Argentina national polo team Andrés Gazzotti; Manuel Andrada; Roberto Cavanagh; Luis Duggan	1936 Berlin	Polo	Men's tournament
Silver	Guillermo Lovell	1936 Berlin	Boxing	Men's Heavyweight
Silver	Jeannette Campbell	1936 Berlin	Swimming	Women's 100m Freestyle
Bronze	Raúl Villarreal	1936 Berlin	Boxing	Men's Middleweight
Bronze	Francisco Risiglione	1936 Berlin	Boxing	Men's Light Heavyweight
Bronze	Julio Curatella; Horacio Podestá	1936 Berlin	Rowing	Men's coxless pair
Gold	Delfo Cabrera	1948 London	Athletics	Men's marathon
Gold	Pascual Pérez	1948 London	Boxing	Men's flyweight
Gold	Rafael Iglesias	1948 London	Boxing	Men's heavyweight
Silver	Noemí Simonetto	1948 London	Athletics	Women's long jump
Silver	Carlos Enrique Díaz Sáenz Valiente	1948 London	Shooting	Men's 25 m rapid fire pistol
Silver	Enrique Conrado Sieburger; Enrique Adolfo Sieburger; Emilio Homps; Rodolfo Rivademar; Rufino Rodríguez de la Torre; Julio Sieburger	1948 London	Sailing	Men's 6 m class
Bronze	Mauro Cia	1948 London	Boxing	Men's light heavyweight
Gold	Tranquilo Cappozzo; Eduardo Guerrero	1952 Helsinki	Rowing	Men's double sculls
Silver	Reinaldo Gorno	1952 Helsinki	Athletics	Men's Marathon
Silver	Antonio Pacenza	1952 Helsinki	Boxing	Men's Light Heavyweight
Bronze	Eladio Herrera	1952 Helsinki	Boxing	Men's Light Middleweight
Bronze	Humberto Selvetti	1952 Helsinki	Weightlifting	Men's Heavyweight
Silver	Humberto Selvetti	1956 Melbourne	Weightlifting	Men's Heavyweight
Bronze	Víctor Zalazar	1956 Melbourne	Boxing	Men's Middleweight
Silver	Héctor Calegaris; Jorge del Río Salas; Jorge Salas Chávez	1960 Rome	Sailing	Men's Dragon
Bronze	Abel Laudonio	1960 Rome	Boxing	Men's lightweight
Silver	Carlos Moratorio	1964 Tokyo	Equestrian	Individual eventing
Bronze	Alberto Demiddi	1968 Mexico City		Rowing Men's single sculls
Bronze	Mario Guilloti	1968 Mexico City	Boxing	Men's welterweight
Silver	Alberto Demiddi	1972 Munich	Rowing	Men's single sculls
Silver	Gabriela Sabatini	1988 Seoul	Tennis	Women's singles
Bronze	Argentina men's national volleyball team: Daniel Castellani; Daniel Colla; Hugo Conte; Juan Cuminetti; Esteban de Palma; Alejandro Diz; Waldo Kantor; Esteban Martínez; Raúl Quiroga; Jon Uriarte; Javier Weber; Claudio Zulianello	1988 Seoul	Volleyball	Men's competition
Bronze	Javier Frana; Christian Miniussi	1992 Barcelona	Tennis	Men's Doubles
Silver	Argentina national football team: Matías Almeyda; Roberto Ayala; Christian Bassedas; Carlos Bossio; Pablo Cavallero; José Chamot; Hernán Crespo; Marcelo Delgado; Marcelo Gallardo; Claudio López; Gustavo López; Hugo Morales; Ariel Ortega; Pablo Paz; Mauricio Pineda; Roberto Sensini; Diego Simeone; Javier Zanetti	1996 Atlanta	Football	Men's tournament
Silver	Carlos Espínola	1996 Atlanta	Sailing	Men's Mistral
Bronze	Pablo Chacón	1996 Atlanta	Boxing	Men's featherweight
Silver	Argentina national field hockey team: Magdalena Aicega; Mariela Antoniska; Inés Arrondo; Luciana Aymar; María Paz Ferrari; Anabel Gambero; Soledad García; María de la Paz Hernández; Laura Maiztegui; Mercedes Margalot; Karina Masotta; Vanina Oneto; Jorgelina Rimoldi; Cecilia Rognoni; Ayelén Stepnik; Paola Vukojicic	2000 Sydney	Field hockey	Women's tournament
Silver	Carlos Espínola	2000 Sydney	Sailing	Men's Mistral
Bronze	Serena Amato	2000 Sydney	Sailing	Women's Europe
Bronze	Javier Conte; Juan de la Fuente	2000 Sydney	Sailing	Men's 470
Gold	Argentina national basketball team: Carlos Delfino; Gabriel Fernández; Emanuel Ginóbili; Leonardo Gutiérrez; Walter Herrmann; Alejandro Montecchia; Andrés Nocioni; Fabricio Oberto; Juan Ignacio Sánchez; Luis Scola; Hugo Sconochini; Rubén Wolkowyski	2004 Athens	Basketball	Men's tournament
Gold	Argentina national football team: Roberto Ayala; Nicolás Burdisso; Wilfredo Caballero; Fabricio Coloccini; César Delgado; Andrés D'Alessandro; Leandro Fernández; Luciano Figueroa; Cristian González; Luis González; Mariano González; Gabriel Heinze; Germán Lux; Javier Mascherano; Nicolás Medina; Clemente Rodríguez; Mauro Rosales; Javier Saviola; Carlos Tevez	2004 Athens	Football	Men's tournament
Bronze	Georgina Bardach	2004 Athens	Swimming	Women's 400 m individual medley
Bronze	Paola Suárez; Patricia Tarabini	2004 Athens	Tennis	Women's doubles
Bronze	Argentina national field hockey team: Magdalena Aicega; Mariela Antoniska; Inés Arrondo; Luciana Aymar; Claudia Burkart; Marina di Giacomo; Soledad García; Mariana González Oliva; Alejandra Gulla; María de la Paz Hernández; Mercedes Margalot; Vanina Oneto; Cecilia Rognoni; Mariné Russo; Ayelén Stepnik; Paola Vukojicic	2004 Athens	Field hockey	Women's tournament
Bronze	Carlos Espínola; Santiago Lange	2004 Athens	Sailing	Men's Tornado
Gold	Walter Pérez; Juan Curuchet	2008 Beijing	Cycling	Men's madison
Gold	Argentina national football team: Lautaro Acosta; Sergio Agüero; Éver Banega; Diego Buonanotte; Ángel Di María; Federico Fazio; Fernando Gago; Ezequiel Garay; Ezequiel Lavezzi; Javier Mascherano; Lionel Messi; Luciano Fabián Monzón; Nicolás Pareja; Juan Román Riquelme; Sergio Romero; José Ernesto Sosa; Óscar Ustari; Pablo Zabaleta	2008 Beijing	Football	Men's tournament
Bronze	Paula Pareto	2008 Beijing	Judo	Women's 48 kg
Bronze	Carlos Espínola; Santiago Lange	2008 Beijing	Sailing	Men's Tornado
Bronze	Argentina women's hockey team: Magdalena Aicega; Luciana Aymar; Noel Barrionuevo; Claudia Burkart; Soledad García; Mariana González Oliva; Alejandra Gulla; María de la Paz Hernández; Giselle Kañevsky; Rosario Luchetti; Mercedes Margalot; Carla Rebecchi; Mariana Rossi; Mariné Russo; Belén Succi; Paola Vukojicic	2008 Beijing	Field hockey	Women's tournament
Bronze	Argentina national basketball team: Carlos Delfino; Manu Ginóbili; Román González; Juan Pedro Gutiérrez; Leonardo Gutiérrez; Federico Kammerichs; Andrés Nocioni; Fabricio Oberto; Antonio Porta; Pablo Prigioni; Paolo Quinteros; Luis Scola	2008 Beijing	Basketball	Men's tournament
Gold	Sebastián Crismanich	2012 London	Taekwondo	Men's 80 kg
Silver	Argentina women's national field hockey team: Luciana Aymar; Noel Barrionuevo; Martina Cavallero; Laura del Colle; Silvina D'Elía; Florencia Habif; Rosario Luchetti; Sofía Maccari; Delfina Merino; Florencia Mutio; Carla Rebecchi; Macarena Rodríguez; Rocío Sánchez Moccia; Mariela Scarone; Daniela Sruoga; Josefina Sruoga	2012 London	Field hockey	Women's tournament
Bronze	Juan Martín del Potro	2012 London	Tennis	Men's singles
Bronze	Lucas Calabrese; Juan de la Fuente	2012 London	Sailing	Men's 470
Gold	Paula Pareto	2016 Rio de Janeiro	Judo	Women's 48 kg
Gold	Santiago Lange; Cecilia Carranza Saroli	2016 Rio de Janeiro	Sailing	Nacra 17
Gold	Argentina men's national field hockey team: Juan Manuel Vivaldi; Gonzalo Peillat; Juan Ignacio Gilardi; Facundo Callioni; Lucas Rey; Matías Paredes; Joaquín Menini; Lucas Vila; Luca Masso; Ignacio Ortiz; Juan Martín Lopez; Juan Manuel Saladino; Matías Rey; Manuel Brunet; Agustín Mazzilli; Lucas Rossi; Pedro Ibarra; Isidoro Ibarra	2016 Rio de Janeiro	Field hockey	Men's tournament
Silver	Juan Martín del Potro	2016 Rio de Janeiro	Tennis	Men's singles
Silver	Argentina women's national field hockey team: Belén Succi; Sofía Toccalino; Agustina Gorzelany; Valentina Raposo; Agostina Alonso; Agustina Albertario; María José Granatto; Delfina Merino; Rocío Sánchez Moccia; Victoria Sauze; Victoria Granatto; Eugenia Trinchinetti; Micaela Retegui; Noel Barrionuevo; Julieta Jankunas; Valentina Costa Biondi	2020 Tokyo	Field hockey	Women's tournament
Bronze	Argentina national rugby sevens team: Rodrigo Isgro; Lucio Cinti; Germán Schulz; Ignacio Mendy; Rodrigo Etchart; Santiago Álvarez; Lautaro Bazán; Gastón Revol; Matías Osadczuk; Luciano González; Santiago Mare; Marcos Moneta; Felipe del Mestre	2020 Tokyo	Rugby sevens	Men's tournament
Bronze	Argentina national volleyball team: Matías Sánchez; Federico Pereyra; Cristian Poglajen; Facundo Conte; Agustín Loser; Santiago Danani; Sebastián Solé; Bruno Lima; Ezequiel Palacios; Luciano De Cecco; Nicolás Méndez; Martín Ramos	2020 Tokyo	Volleyball	Men's tournament
Gold	José Torres	2024 Paris	Cycling	Men's BMX freestyle
