= Argentina at the Olympics =

- IOC code: ARG
- NOC: Argentine Olympic Committee
- Website: www.coarg.org.ar (in Spanish)
- Medals Ranked 43rd: Gold 22 Silver 27 Bronze 31 Total 80

Summer appearances
- 1900; 1904; 1908; 1912; 1920; 1924; 1928; 1932; 1936; 1948; 1952; 1956; 1960; 1964; 1968; 1972; 1976; 1980; 1984; 1988; 1992; 1996; 2000; 2004; 2008; 2012; 2016; 2020; 2024

Winter appearances
- 1928; 1932–1936; 1948; 1952; 1956; 1960; 1964; 1968; 1972; 1976; 1980; 1984; 1988; 1992; 1994; 1998; 2002; 2006; 2010; 2014; 2018; 2022; 2026

Argentina participated at the Olympic Games for the first time in 1900. It has participated at all subsequent Summer Olympic Games except in 1904, 1912, and the nation boycotted the Moscow Olympics due to its support for the United States in 1980. The nation participated at the Winter Olympic Games in 1928, 1948, 1952 and continuously since 1960.

Argentina was one of the 12 countries – the only from Ibero-America – who founded the International Olympic Committee (IOC) in 1894, being represented by the first Executive Council José Benjamín Zubiaur, who served in that role until 1907. The National Olympic Committee for Argentina was created and recognized in 1923. The country had successful performances during the period 1924-1952, claiming at least one gold medal in every edition.

Starting with the 1956 Summer Olympics, Argentina suffered a gradual overall decline, a situation that reached its most critical point in the 1976 and 1984 Summer Olympics. In those Games, Argentina did not win any medals. At the 2004 Summer Olympics in Athens, the country claimed gold medals for the first time after 52 years. 2004 also marked the point where Argentina was surpassed by neighbor Brazil as the South American country with most golds and total medals. The Olympics hosted by Brazil in 2016 had the biggest Argentinian delegation, 213 athletes, and the country won 3 gold medals for the first time since 1948, including the first by a woman.

Argentine athletes have won a total of 80 medals at the Summer Olympic Games. 24 of these medals have come in boxing, Argentina has won more medals in this sport than in any other. The nation has not won yet any medals at the Winter Olympic Games.

Buenos Aires hosted the 2018 Summer Youth Olympics.

== Medal tables ==
Highlighted in bold indicates all-time best results

=== Medals by Summer Games ===
Games	Athletes	Gold	Silver	Bronze	Total	Rank
(French Third Republic) 1900 Paris	1	0	0	0	0	–
(United States) 1904 St. Louis	did not participate					
(United Kingdom) 1908 London	1	0	0	0	0	–
(Sweden) 1912 Stockholm	did not participate					
(Belgium) 1920 Antwerp	1	0	0	0	0	–
(French Third Republic) 1924 Paris	77	1	**3**	2	6	16
(Netherlands) 1928 Amsterdam	81	**3**	**3**	1	7	12
(United States) 1932 Los Angeles	32	**3**	1	0	4	11
(Nazi Germany) 1936 Berlin	51	2	2	3	7	13
(United Kingdom) 1948 London	199	**3**	**3**	1	7	13
(Finland) 1952 Helsinki	123	1	2	2	5	19
(Australia) 1956 Melbourne	28	0	1	1	2	29
(Italy) 1960 Rome	91	0	1	1	2	30
(Japan) 1964 Tokyo	102	0	1	0	1	30
1968 Mexico City	89	0	0	2	2	41
(West Germany) 1972 Munich	92	0	1	0	1	33
(Canada) 1976 Montreal	69	0	0	0	0	–
(Soviet Union) 1980 Moscow	boycotted					
(United States) 1984 Los Angeles	82	0	0	0	0	–
(South Korea) 1988 Seoul	118	0	1	1	2	35
(Spain) 1992 Barcelona	84	0	0	1	1	54
(United States) 1996 Atlanta	178	0	2	1	3	54
(Australia) 2000 Sydney	143	0	2	2	4	57
(Greece) 2004 Athens	152	2	0	**4**	6	38
(China) 2008 Beijing	137	2	0	**4**	6	35
(United Kingdom) 2012 London	142	1	1	2	4	42
(Brazil) 2016 Rio de Janeiro	**213**	**3**	1	0	4	27
(Japan) 2020 Tokyo	189	0	1	2	3	72
(France) 2024 Paris	136	1	1	1	3	52
(United States) 2028 Los Angeles	future event					
(Australia) 2032 Brisbane	future event					
Total (26/30)	2,611	22	27	31	80	43

=== Medals by Winter Games ===
Games	Athletes	Gold	Silver	Bronze	Total	Rank
(Switzerland) 1928 St. Moritz	10	0	0	0	0	–
(United States) 1932 Lake Placid	did not participate					
(Nazi Germany) 1936 Garmisch-Partenkirchen	did not participate					
(Switzerland) 1948 St. Moritz	9	0	0	0	0	–
(Norway) 1952 Oslo	12	0	0	0	0	–
(Italy) 1956 Cortina d'Ampezzo	did not participate					
(United States) 1960 Squaw Valley	6	0	0	0	0	–
(Austria) 1964 Innsbruck	12	0	0	0	0	–
(France) 1968 Grenoble	5	0	0	0	0	–
(Japan) 1972 Sapporo	2	0	0	0	0	–
(Austria) 1976 Innsbruck	8	0	0	0	0	–
(United States) 1980 Lake Placid	13	0	0	0	0	–
(Socialist Federal Republic of Yugoslavia) 1984 Sarajevo	18	0	0	0	0	–
(Canada) 1988 Calgary	15	0	0	0	0	–
(France) 1992 Albertville	**20**	0	0	0	0	–
(Norway) 1994 Lillehammer	10	0	0	0	0	–
(Japan) 1998 Nagano	2	0	0	0	0	–
(United States) 2002 Salt Lake City	11	0	0	0	0	–
(Italy) 2006 Turin	9	0	0	0	0	–
(Canada) 2010 Vancouver	7	0	0	0	0	–
(Russia) 2014 Sochi	7	0	0	0	0	–
(South Korea) 2018 Pyeongchang	7	0	0	0	0	–
(China) 2022 Beijing	6	0	0	0	0	–
(Italy) 2026 Milano Cortina	8	0	0	0	0	–
(France) 2030 French Alps	future event					
(United States) 2034 Utah	future event					
Total (21/25)	197	0	0	0	0	–

=== Medals by summer sport ===
Sports	Gold	Silver	Bronze	Total	Rank
Boxing	**7**	**7**	**10**	**24**	9
Athletics	2	3	0	5	49
Football	2	2	0	4	5
Polo	2	0	0	2	2
Cycling	2	0	0	2	22
Sailing	1	5	5	11	24
Field hockey	1	3	3	7	7
Rowing	1	1	2	4	28
Swimming	1	1	1	3	37
Basketball	1	0	1	2	4
Judo	1	0	1	2	30
Taekwondo	1	0	0	1	21
Tennis	0	2	3	5	23
Weightlifting	0	1	1	2	53
Equestrian	0	1	0	1	26
Shooting	0	1	0	1	60
Volleyball	0	0	2	2	20
Fencing	0	0	1	1	36
Rugby sevens	0	0	1	1	6
Total	22	27	31	80	42

=== Medals by gender ===
Gender	Gold	Silver	Bronze	Total
Men	20	20	24	64
Women	1	6	7	14
Mixed	1	1	0	2
Total	22	27	31	80

== List of medalists ==
Medal	Name(s)	Games	Sport	Event
Gold	Polo team: Arturo Kenny; Juan Miles; Guillermo Naylor; Juan Nelson; Enrique Padilla	(France) 1924 Paris	Polo	Men's tournament
Silver	Luis Brunetto	(France) 1924 Paris	Athletics	Men's triple jump
Silver	Alfredo Copello	(France) 1924 Paris	Boxing	Men's lightweight
Silver	Héctor Méndez	(France) 1924 Paris	Boxing	Men's welterweight
Bronze	Pedro Quartucci	(France) 1924 Paris	Boxing	Men's featherweight
Bronze	Alfredo Porzio	(France) 1924 Paris	Boxing	Men's heavyweight
Gold	Alberto Zorrilla	(Netherlands) 1928 Amsterdam	Swimming	Men's 400 m freestyle
Gold	Víctor Avendaño	(Netherlands) 1928 Amsterdam	Boxing	Men's light heavyweight
Gold	Arturo Rodríguez	(Netherlands) 1928 Amsterdam	Boxing	Men's heavyweight
Silver	Víctor Peralta	(Netherlands) 1928 Amsterdam	Boxing	Men's featherweight
Silver	Raúl Landini	(Netherlands) 1928 Amsterdam	Boxing	Men's welterweight
Silver	Men's football team: Ludovico Bidoglio; Ángel Bossio; Saúl Calandra; Alfredo Carricaberry; Roberto Cherro; Octavio Díaz; Juan Evaristo; Manuel Ferreira; Enrique Gainzarain; Alfredo Helman; Segundo Luna; Ángel Medici; Luis Monti; Pedro Ochoa; Rodolfo Orlandini; Raimundo Orsi; Fernando Paternoster; Feliciano Perducca; Natalio Perinetti; Domingo Tarasconi; Luis Weihmuller; Adolfo Zumelzú	(Netherlands) 1928 Amsterdam	Football	Men's tournament
Bronze	Raúl Anganuzzi; Carmelo Camet; Roberto Larraz; Héctor Lucchetti; Luis Lucchetti	1928 Amsterdam (Netherlands)	Fencing	Men's team foil
Gold	Juan Carlos Zabala	(United States) 1932 Los Angeles	Athletics	Men's marathon
Gold	Carmelo Robledo	(United States) 1932 Los Angeles	Boxing	Men's featherweight
Gold	Santiago Lovell	(United States) 1932 Los Angeles	Boxing	Men's heavyweight
Silver	Amado Azar	(United States) 1932 Los Angeles	Boxing	Men's middleweight
Gold	Oscar Casanovas	(Nazi Germany) 1936 Berlin	Boxing	Men's featherweight
Gold	Polo team: Andrés Gazzotti; Manuel Andrada; Roberto Cavanagh; Luis Duggan	(Nazi Germany) 1936 Berlin	Polo	Men's tournament
Silver	Guillermo Lovell	(Nazi Germany) 1936 Berlin	Boxing	Men's heavyweight
Silver	Jeannette Campbell	(Nazi Germany) 1936 Berlin	Swimming	Women's 100m Freestyle
Bronze	Raúl Villarreal	(Nazi Germany) 1936 Berlin	Boxing	Men's middleweight
Bronze	Francisco Risiglione	(Nazi Germany) 1936 Berlin	Boxing	Men's light heavyweight
Bronze	Julio Curatella; Horacio Podestá	(Nazi Germany) 1936 Berlin	Rowing	Men's coxless pair
Gold	Delfo Cabrera	(United Kingdom) 1948 London	Athletics	Men's marathon
Gold	Pascual Pérez	(United Kingdom) 1948 London	Boxing	Men's flyweight
Gold	Rafael Iglesias	(United Kingdom) 1948 London	Boxing	Men's heavyweight
Silver	Noemí Simonetto	(United Kingdom) 1948 London	Athletics	Women's long jump
Silver	Carlos Enrique Díaz Sáenz Valiente	(United Kingdom) 1948 London	Shooting	Men's 25 m rapid fire pistol
Silver	Enrique Conrado Sieburger; Enrique Adolfo Sieburger; Emilio Homps; Rodolfo Rivademar; Rufino Rodríguez de la Torre; Julio Sieburger	(United Kingdom) 1948 London	Sailing	Men's 6 m class
Bronze	Mauro Cia	(United Kingdom) 1948 London	Boxing	Men's light heavyweight
Gold	Tranquilo Cappozzo; Eduardo Guerrero	(Finland) 1952 Helsinki	Rowing	Men's double sculls
Silver	Reinaldo Gorno	(Finland) 1952 Helsinki	Athletics	Men's marathon
Silver	Antonio Pacenza	(Finland) 1952 Helsinki	Boxing	Men's light heavyweight
Bronze	Eladio Herrera	(Finland) 1952 Helsinki	Boxing	Men's light middleweight
Bronze	Humberto Selvetti	(Finland) 1952 Helsinki	Weightlifting	Men's heavyweight
Silver	Humberto Selvetti	(Australia) 1956 Melbourne	Weightlifting	Men's heavyweight
Bronze	Víctor Zalazar	(Australia) 1956 Melbourne	Boxing	Men's middleweight
Silver	Héctor Calegaris; Jorge del Río Salas; Jorge Salas Chávez	(Italy) 1960 Rome	Sailing	Men's Dragon
Bronze	Abel Laudonio	(Italy) 1960 Rome	Boxing	Men's lightweight
Silver	Carlos Moratorio	(Japan) 1964 Tokyo	Equestrian	Individual eventing
Bronze	Alberto Demiddi	1968 Mexico City	Rowing	Men's single sculls
Bronze	Mario Guilloti	1968 Mexico City	Boxing	Men's welterweight
Silver	Alberto Demiddi	(West Germany) 1972 Munich	Rowing	Men's single sculls
Silver	Gabriela Sabatini	(South Korea) 1988 Seoul	Tennis	Women's singles
Bronze	Men's national volleyball team: Daniel Castellani; Daniel Colla; Hugo Conte; Juan Cuminetti; Esteban de Palma; Alejandro Diz; Waldo Kantor; Esteban Martínez; Raúl Quiroga; Jon Uriarte; Javier Weber; Claudio Zulianello	(South Korea) 1988 Seoul	Volleyball	Men's tournament
Bronze	Javier Frana; Christian Miniussi	(Spain) 1992 Barcelona	Tennis	Men's Doubles
Silver	Men's under-23 football team: Matías Almeyda; Roberto Ayala; Christian Bassedas; Carlos Bossio; Pablo Cavallero; José Chamot; Hernán Crespo; Marcelo Delgado; Marcelo Gallardo; Claudio López; Gustavo López; Hugo Morales; Ariel Ortega; Pablo Paz; Mauricio Pineda; Roberto Sensini; Diego Simeone; Javier Zanetti	(United States) 1996 Atlanta	Football	Men's tournament
Silver	Carlos Espínola	(United States) 1996 Atlanta	Sailing	Men's Mistral
Bronze	Pablo Chacón	(United States) 1996 Atlanta	Boxing	Men's featherweight
Silver	Women's national field hockey team: Magdalena Aicega; Mariela Antoniska; Inés Arrondo; Luciana Aymar; María Paz Ferrari; Anabel Gambero; Soledad García; María de la Paz Hernández; Laura Maiztegui; Mercedes Margalot; Karina Masotta; Vanina Oneto; Jorgelina Rimoldi; Cecilia Rognoni; Ayelén Stepnik; Paola Vukojicic	(Australia) 2000 Sydney	Field hockey	Women's tournament
Silver	Carlos Espínola	(Australia) 2000 Sydney	Sailing	Men's Mistral
Bronze	Serena Amato	(Australia) 2000 Sydney	Sailing	Women's Europe
Bronze	Javier Conte; Juan de la Fuente	(Australia) 2000 Sydney	Sailing	Men's 470
Gold	Men's national basketball team: Carlos Delfino; Gabriel Fernández; Emanuel Ginóbili; Leonardo Gutiérrez; Walter Herrmann; Alejandro Montecchia; Andrés Nocioni; Fabricio Oberto; Juan Ignacio Sánchez; Luis Scola; Hugo Sconochini; Rubén Wolkowyski	(Greece) 2004 Athens	Basketball	Men's tournament
Gold	Men's under-23 football team: Roberto Ayala; Nicolás Burdisso; Wilfredo Caballero; Fabricio Coloccini; César Delgado; Andrés D'Alessandro; Leandro Fernández; Luciano Figueroa; Cristian González; Luis González; Mariano González; Gabriel Heinze; Germán Lux; Javier Mascherano; Nicolás Medina; Clemente Rodríguez; Mauro Rosales; Javier Saviola; Carlos Tevez	(Greece) 2004 Athens	Football	Men's tournament
Bronze	Georgina Bardach	(Greece) 2004 Athens	Swimming	Women's 400 m individual medley
Bronze	Paola Suárez; Patricia Tarabini	(Greece) 2004 Athens	Tennis	Women's doubles
Bronze	Women's national field hockey team: Magdalena Aicega; Mariela Antoniska; Inés Arrondo; Luciana Aymar; Claudia Burkart; Marina di Giacomo; Soledad García; Mariana González Oliva; Alejandra Gulla; María de la Paz Hernández; Mercedes Margalot; Vanina Oneto; Cecilia Rognoni; Mariné Russo; Ayelén Stepnik; Paola Vukojicic	(Greece) 2004 Athens	Field hockey	Women's tournament
Bronze	Carlos Espínola; Santiago Lange	(Greece) 2004 Athens	Sailing	Men's Tornado
Gold	Walter Pérez; Juan Curuchet	(China) 2008 Beijing	Cycling	Men's madison
Gold	Men's under-23 football team: Lautaro Acosta; Sergio Agüero; Éver Banega; Diego Buonanotte; Ángel Di María; Federico Fazio; Fernando Gago; Ezequiel Garay; Ezequiel Lavezzi; Javier Mascherano; Lionel Messi; Luciano Fabián Monzón; Nicolás Pareja; Juan Román Riquelme; Sergio Romero; José Ernesto Sosa; Óscar Ustari; Pablo Zabaleta	(China) 2008 Beijing	Football	Men's tournament
Bronze	Paula Pareto	(China) 2008 Beijing	Judo	Women's 48 kg
Bronze	Carlos Espínola; Santiago Lange	(China) 2008 Beijing	Sailing	Men's Tornado
Bronze	Women's national field hockey team: Magdalena Aicega; Luciana Aymar; Noel Barrionuevo; Claudia Burkart; Soledad García; Mariana González Oliva; Alejandra Gulla; María de la Paz Hernández; Giselle Kañevsky; Rosario Luchetti; Mercedes Margalot; Carla Rebecchi; Mariana Rossi; Mariné Russo; Belén Succi; Paola Vukojicic	(China) 2008 Beijing	Field hockey	Women's tournament
Bronze	Men's national basketball team: Carlos Delfino; Manu Ginóbili; Román González; Juan Pedro Gutiérrez; Leonardo Gutiérrez; Federico Kammerichs; Andrés Nocioni; Fabricio Oberto; Antonio Porta; Pablo Prigioni; Paolo Quinteros; Luis Scola	(China) 2008 Beijing	Basketball	Men's tournament
Gold	Sebastián Crismanich	(United Kingdom) 2012 London	Taekwondo	Men's 80 kg
Silver	Women's national field hockey team: Luciana Aymar; Noel Barrionuevo; Martina Cavallero; Laura del Colle; Silvina D'Elía; Florencia Habif; Rosario Luchetti; Sofía Maccari; Delfina Merino; Florencia Mutio; Carla Rebecchi; Macarena Rodríguez; Rocío Sánchez Moccia; Mariela Scarone; Daniela Sruoga; Josefina Sruoga	(United Kingdom) 2012 London	Field hockey	Women's tournament
Bronze	Juan Martín del Potro	(United Kingdom) 2012 London	Tennis	Men's singles
Bronze	Lucas Calabrese; Juan de la Fuente	(United Kingdom) 2012 London	Sailing	Men's 470
Gold	Paula Pareto	(Brazil) 2016 Rio de Janeiro	Judo	Women's 48 kg
Gold	Santiago Lange; Cecilia Carranza Saroli	(Brazil) 2016 Rio de Janeiro	Sailing	Nacra 17
Gold	Men's national field hockey team: Juan Manuel Vivaldi; Gonzalo Peillat; Juan Ignacio Gilardi; Facundo Callioni; Lucas Rey; Matías Paredes; Joaquín Menini; Lucas Vila; Luca Masso; Ignacio Ortiz; Juan Martín Lopez; Juan Manuel Saladino; Matías Rey; Manuel Brunet; Agustín Mazzilli; Lucas Rossi; Pedro Ibarra; Isidoro Ibarra	(Brazil) 2016 Rio de Janeiro	Field hockey	Men's tournament
Silver	Juan Martín del Potro	(Brazil) 2016 Rio de Janeiro	Tennis	Men's singles
Silver	Women's national field hockey team: Sofía Toccalino; Agustina Gorzelany; Valentina Raposo; Agostina Alonso; Agustina Albertario; María José Granatto; Delfina Merino; Rocío Sánchez Moccia; Victoria Sauze; Victoria Granatto; Eugenia Trinchinetti; Micaela Retegui; Noel Barrionuevo; Julieta Jankunas; Valentina Costa Biondi	(Japan) 2020 Tokyo	Field hockey	Women's tournament
Bronze	Rugby sevens team: Rodrigo Isgro; Lucio Cinti; Germán Schulz; Ignacio Mendy; Rodrigo Etchart; Santiago Álvarez; Lautaro Bazán; Gastón Revol; Matías Osadczuk; Luciano González; Santiago Mare; Marcos Moneta; Felipe del Mestre	(Japan) 2020 Tokyo	Rugby sevens	Men's tournament
Bronze	Men's national volleyball team: Matías Sánchez; Federico Pereyra; Cristian Poglajen; Facundo Conte; Agustín Loser; Santiago Danani; Sebastián Solé; Bruno Lima; Ezequiel Palacios; Luciano De Cecco; Nicolás Méndez; Martín Ramos	(Japan) 2020 Tokyo	Volleyball	Men's tournament
Gold	José Torres	(France) 2024 Paris	Cycling	Men's BMX freestyle
Silver	Mateo Majdalani; Eugenia Bosco	(France) 2024 Paris	Sailing	Mixed Nacra 17
Bronze	Women's national field hockey team: Sofía Toccalino Agustina Gorzelany Valentina Raposo Agostina Alonso Agustina Albertario María José Granatto Cristina Cosentino Rocío Sánchez Moccia Victoria Sauze Sofía Cairó Eugenia Trinchinetti Lara Casas Juana Castellaro Pilar Campoy Julieta Jankunas Zoe Díaz	(France) 2024 Paris	Field hockey	Women's tournament

== Summary by sport ==
=== Fencing ===
Argentina's Olympic debut in 1900 consisted of a single fencer, Francisco Camet, who placed fifth (among a field of over 100 fencers) in the men's épée.

Games	Fencers	Events	Gold	Silver	Bronze	Total
(Kingdom of Greece) 1896 Athens	0	0/3	0	0	0	0
(France) 1900 Paris	1	1/7	0	0	0	0
(United States) 1904 St. Louis	0	0/5	0	0	0	0
(United Kingdom) 1908 London	0	0/4	0	0	0	0
(Sweden) 1912 Stockholm	0	0/5	0	0	0	0
(Belgium) 1920 Antwerp	0	0/6	0	0	0	0
(France) 1924 Paris	13	6/7	0	0	0	0
(Netherlands) 1928 Amsterdam	9	3/7	0	0	1	1
(United States) 1932 Los Angeles	5	4/7	0	0	0	0
(Nazi Germany) 1936 Berlin	11	5/7	0	0	0	0
(United Kingdom) 1948 London	19	7/7	0	0	0	0
(Finland) 1952 Helsinki	11	6/7	0	0	0	0
(Australia) 1956 Melbourne	1	1/7	0	0	0	0
(Italy) 1960 Rome	6	2/8	0	0	0	0
(Japan) 1964 Tokyo	11	7/8	0	0	0	0
1968 Mexico City	10	7/8	0	0	0	0
(West Germany) 1972 Munich	5	5/8	0	0	0	0
(Canada) 1976 Montreal	7	5/8	0	0	0	0
(Soviet Union) 1980 Moscow	0	0/8	0	0	0	0
(United States) 1984 Los Angeles	10	5/8	0	0	0	0
(South Korea) 1988 Seoul	2	3/8	0	0	0	0
(Spain) 1992 Barcelona	5	3/8	0	0	0	0
(United States) 1996 Atlanta	5	4/10	0	0	0	0
(Australia) 2000 Sydney	3	2/10	0	0	0	0
(Greece) 2004 Athens	1	1/10	0	0	0	0
(China) 2008 Beijing	1	1/10	0	0	0	0
(United Kingdom) 2012 London	1	1/10	0	0	0	0
(Brazil) 2016 Rio de Janeiro	1	1/10	0	0	0	0
(Japan) 2020 Tokyo	1	1/12	0	0	0	0
Total			0	0	1	1

Event	No. of appearances	First appearance	First medal	First gold medal	Gold	Silver	Bronze	Total	Best finish
Men's foil	8/28	1936	—N/a	—N/a	0	0	0	0	8th (2016)
Men's team foil	2/24	1936	—N/a	—N/a	0	0	0	0	8th (2016)
Women's foil	3/23	1936	—N/a	—N/a	0	0	0	0	QF (1936)
Women's team foil	0/14	—N/a	—N/a	—N/a	0	0	0	0	—N/a
Men's épée	9/28	1936	—N/a	—N/a	0	0	0	0	13th (1948)
Men's team épée	6/25	1936	—N/a	—N/a	0	0	0	0	9th (2016)
Women's épée	2/7	2016	—N/a	—N/a	0	0	0	0	6th (2016)
Women's team épée	1/6	2016	—N/a	—N/a	0	0	0	0	9th (2016)
Men's sabre	9/29	1936	—N/a	—N/a	0	0	0	0	R2 (1948, 2008)
Men's team sabre	0/25	—N/a	—N/a	—N/a	0	0	0	0	—N/a
Women's sabre	2/5	2004	—N/a	—N/a	0	0	0	0	R1 (2004)
Women's team sabre	0/3	—N/a	—N/a	—N/a	0	0	0	0	—N/a

=== Rowing ===
Games	No. Sailors	Events	Gold	Silver	Bronze	Total	Ranking
1896 Athens	Event wasn't held						
1900 Paris	0	0/5	0	0	0	0	
1904 St Louis	0	0/5	0	0	0	0	
1908 London	0	0/5	0	0	0	0	
1912 Stockholm	0	0/4	0	0	0	0	
1916	Games Cancelled						
1920 Antwerp	0	0/5	0	0	0	0	
1924 Paris	9	1/7	0	0	0	0	
1928 Amsterdam	9	1/7	0	0	0	0	
1932 Los Angeles	0	0/7	0	0	0	0	
1936 Berlin	3	2/7	0	0	1	1	9=
1940	Games Cancelled						
1944	Games Cancelled						
1948 London	26	7/7	0	0	0	0	
1952 Helsinki	9	3/7	1	0	0	1	4=
1956 Melbourne	0	0/7	0	0	0	0	
1960 Rome	9	3/7	0	0	0	0	
1964 Tokyo	12	5/7	0	0	0	0	
1968 Mexico City	9	3/7	0	0	1	1	11=
1972 Munich	19	5/7	0	1	0	1	6=
1976 Montreal	10	3/14	0	0	0	0	
1980	0	0/14	0	0	0	0	
1984 Los Angeles	7	3/14	0	0	0	0	
1988	6	2/14	0	0	0	0	
1992 Barcelona	6	3/14	0	0	0	0	
1996 Atlanta	22	9/14	0	0	0	0	
2000 Sydney	8	5/14	0	0	0	0	
2004 Athens	6	4/14	0	0	0	0	
2008 Beijing	2	2/14	0	0	0	0	
2012 London	10	6/14	0	0	0	0	
2016 Rio	2	2/14	0	0	0	0	
2020 Tokyo	4	2/14	0	0	0	0	
2024 Paris	4	2/14	0	0	0	0	
Total	192	264	1	1	2	4	XX

=== Sailing ===
Games	No. Sailors	Events	Gold	Silver	Bronze	Total	Ranking
1900 Paris	0	0/13	0	0	0	0	
1908 London	0	0/4	0	0	0	0	
1912 Stockholm	0	0/4	0	0	0	0	
1920 Antwerp	0	0/14	0	0	0	0	
1924 Paris	6	2/3	0	0	0	0	
1928 Amsterdam	5	1/3	0	0	0	0	
1932 Los Angeles	0	0/4	0	0	0	0	
1936 Berlin	11	2/4	0	0	0	0	
1948 London	18	5/5	0	1	0	1	6=
1952 Helsinki	14	5/5	0	0	0	0	
1956 Melbourne	6	3/5	0	0	0	0	
1960 Rome	9	4/5	0	1	0	1	6
1964 Tokyo	6	3/5	0	0	0	0	
1968 Mexico City	6	3/5	0	0	0	0	
1972 Munich	9	4/6	0	0	0	0	
1976 Montreal	4	2/6	0	0	0	0	
1980 Moscow	0	0/6	0	0	0	0	
1984 Los Angeles	8	4/7	0	0	0	0	
1988 Seoul	11	6/8	0	0	0	0	
1992 Barcelona	7	5/10	0	0	0	0	
1996 Atlanta	10	7/10	0	1	0	1	12=
2000 Sydney	11	7/11	0	1	2	3	9
2004 Athens	11	8/11	0	0	1	1	15=
2008 Qingdoa	10	7/11	0	0	1	1	14=
2012 Weymouth	8	6/10	0	0	1	1	12=
2016 Rio	13	9/10	1	0	0	1	7=
2020 Tokyo	11	8/10	0	0	0	0	
2024 Paris	7	6/10	0	1	0	1	11=
Total			1	5	5	11	24

== See also ==
- List of flag bearers for Argentina at the Olympics
- Argentina at the Paralympics
- List of Olympic medalists for Argentina
