= Volleyball at the 1988 Summer Olympics – Men's tournament =

Men's volleyball at the Games of the XXIV Olympiad
- Venue: Jamsil Gymnasium, Hanyang University Gymnasium and Saemaul Sports Hall
- Date: 17 September – 2 October

Medalists
1st place, gold medalist(s)		United States (2nd title)
2nd place, silver medalist(s)		Soviet Union
3rd place, bronze medalist(s)		Argentina

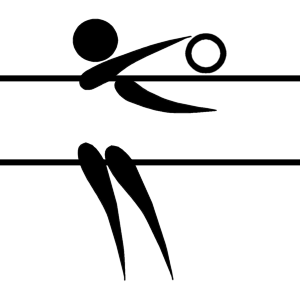

The men's tournament in volleyball at the 1988 Summer Olympics was the 7th edition of the event at the Summer Olympics, organized by the world's governing body, the FIVB in conjunction with the IOC. It was held in Seoul, South Korea from 17 September to 2 October 1988.

== Qualification ==
Means of qualification	Date	Host	Vacancies	Qualified
Host country	30 September 1981	(West Germany) Baden-Baden	1	South Korea
1984 Summer Olympic Games	29 July – 11 August 1984	(United States) Los Angeles	1	United States
1985 World Cup	22 November – 1 December 1985	Japan	1	Soviet Union
1986 World Championship	25 September – 5 October 1986	France	1	Bulgaria
1st World Qualifier	10–17 May 1987	(Brazil) Brasília	1	Argentina
1987 African Championship	December 1987	(Tunisia) Tunis	1	Tunisia
1987 Asian Championsnip	15–25 October 1987	Kuwait City	1	Japan
1987 European Championship	25 September – 3 October 1987	Belgium	1	France
1987 NORCECA Championship	12–19 June 1987	(Cuba) Havana	1	~~Cuba~~; Italy*
1987 South American Championship	20–27 September 1987	(Uruguay) Montevideo	1	Brazil
2nd World Qualifier	31 January – 7 February 1988	(Netherlands) Amsterdam	1	Netherlands
3rd World Qualifier	20–25 May 1988	(Italy) Florence	1	Sweden
Total			12	

* Cuba withdrew because of the North Korea-led boycott and were replaced by Italy, who won the best-of-three playoff against China.

== Pools composition ==
Pool A	Pool B
South Korea (Hosts)	Argentina
Brazil	France
Bulgaria	Japan
Sweden	Netherlands
Italy	Tunisia
Soviet Union	United States

== Venues ==
Main venue	Sub venue	Sub venue
Seoul, South Korea	Seoul, South Korea	Seoul, South Korea
Jamsil Gymnasium	Hanyang University Gymnasium	Saemaul Sports Hall
Capacity: 13,409	Capacity: 8,000	Capacity: 4,500
	No Image	No Image

== Preliminary round ==
=== Pool A ===
Pos	Team	Pld	W	L	Pts	SW	SL	SR	SPW	SPL	SPR	Qualification
1	Soviet Union	5	4	1	9	14	4	3.500	248	190	1.305	Semifinals
2	Brazil	5	4	1	9	14	7	2.000	296	225	1.316	Semifinals
3	Sweden	5	2	3	7	9	11	0.818	220	262	0.840	5th–8th semifinals
4	Bulgaria	5	2	3	7	7	9	0.778	190	194	0.979	5th–8th semifinals
5	Italy	5	2	3	7	7	11	0.636	203	222	0.914	9th–12th semifinals
6	South Korea	5	1	4	6	5	14	0.357	200	264	0.758	9th–12th semifinals

17 September 1988	Sweden	3–2	South Korea
17 September 1988	(10–15, 5–15, 15–12, 17–15, 15–4)

18 September 1988	Brazil	3–0	Italy
18 September 1988	(15–7, 15–4, 17–15)

18 September 1988	Soviet Union	3–0	Bulgaria
18 September 1988	(15–7, 15–9, 15–8)

19 September 1988	Soviet Union	3–0	Sweden
19 September 1988	(15–8, 15–7, 16–14)

19 September 1988	Bulgaria	3–0	Italy
19 September 1988	(15–7, 15–8, 15–6)

19 September 1988	South Korea	3–2	Brazil
19 September 1988	(19–17, 15–8 ,6–15, 11–15 ,15–12)

22 September 1988	Brazil	3–1	Bulgaria
22 September 1988	(13–15, 15–6, 15–12, 15–12)

22 September 1988	Italy	3–2	Sweden
22 September 1988	(9–15, 15–6, 12–15, 15–12, 15–3)

22 September 1988	Soviet Union	3–0	South Korea
22 September 1988	(15–6, 15–7, 15–13)

24 September 1988	Brazil	3–1	Sweden
24 September 1988	(15–6, 13–15, 15–0, 15–12)

24 September 1988	Bulgaria	3–0	South Korea
24 September 1988	(15–7, 15–10, 15–8)

24 September 1988	Soviet Union	3–1	Italy
24 September 1988	(15–9, 15–9, 12–15, 15–12)

26 September 1988	Italy	3–0	South Korea
26 September 1988	(15–10, 15–7 ,15–5)

26 September 1988	Brazil	3–2	Soviet Union
26 September 1988	(12–15, 9–15, 15–8, 15–11, 15–6)

26 September 1988	Sweden	3–0	Bulgaria
26 September 1988	(15–11, 15–12 ,15–8)

=== Pool B ===
Pos	Team	Pld	W	L	Pts	SW	SL	SR	SPW	SPL	SPR	Qualification
1	United States	5	5	0	10	15	3	5.000	263	155	1.697	Semifinals
2	Argentina	5	3	2	8	11	7	1.571	219	211	1.038	Semifinals
3	France	5	3	2	8	10	7	1.429	222	190	1.168	5th–8th semifinals
4	Netherlands	5	3	2	8	10	7	1.429	202	183	1.104	5th–8th semifinals
5	Japan	5	1	4	6	5	12	0.417	182	225	0.809	9th–12th semifinals
6	Tunisia	5	0	5	5	0	15	0.000	101	225	0.449	9th–12th semifinals

17 September 1988	Netherlands	3–1	France
17 September 1988	(15–8, 7–15, 15–11, 15–7)

18 September 1988	United States	3–0	Japan
18 September 1988	(15–13, 15–2, 15–2)

18 September 1988	Argentina	3–0	Tunisia
18 September 1988	(15–5, 15–11, 15–6)

19 September 1988	United States	3–1	Netherlands
19 September 1988	(15–7, 12–15, 15–1, 15–11)

19 September 1988	France	3–0	Tunisia
19 September 1988	(15–10, 15–3 ,15–9)

19 September 1988	Argentina	3–1	Japan
19 September 1988	(15–11, 15–12 ,11–15, 15–11)

22 September 1988	United States	3–2	Argentina
22 September 1988	(11–15, 11–15 ,15–4, 17–15, 15–7)

22 September 1988	France	3–1	Japan
22 September 1988	(10–15, 15–10 ,17–15, 15–12)

22 September 1988	Netherlands	3–0	Tunisia
22 September 1988	(15–6, 15–10, 15–5)

24 September 1988	United States	3–0	France
24 September 1988	(17–15, 15–6, 15–13)

24 September 1988	Japan	3–0	Tunisia
24 September 1988	(15–4, 15–11 ,15–7)

24 September 1988	Argentina	3–0	Netherlands
24 September 1988	(15–11, 15–7 ,15–8)

26 September 1988	France	3–0	Argentina
26 September 1988	(15–7, 15–5, 15–5)

26 September 1988	United States	3–0	Tunisia
26 September 1988	(15–4, 15–6 ,15–4)

26 September 1988	Netherlands	3–0	Japan
26 September 1988	(15–7, 15–4 ,15–8)

== Final round ==
=== 9th–12th places ===
9th–12th semifinals
28 September
Italy	3
Tunisia	0
28 September
South Korea	2
Japan	3

9th place match
30 September
Italy	3
Japan	2
11th place match
30 September
Tunisia	0
South Korea	3

==== 9th–12th semifinals ====
28 September 1988	Italy	3–0	Tunisia
28 September 1988	(15–2, 15–2, 15–5)

28 September 1988	South Korea	2–3	Japan
28 September 1988	(15–13, 15–6, 9–15, 13–15, 9–15)

==== 11th place match ====
30 September 1988	Tunisia	0–3	South Korea
30 September 1988	(11–15, 9–15, 7–15)

==== 9th place match ====
30 September 1988	Italy	3–2	Japan
30 September 1988	(15–11, 15–11, 12–15, 13–15, 15–7)

=== 5th–8th places ===
5th–8th semifinals
28 September
Sweden	2
Netherlands	3
28 September
Bulgaria	3
France	0

5th place match
1 October
Netherlands	3
Bulgaria	0
7th place match
1 October
Sweden	3
France	2

==== 5th–8th semifinals ====
28 September 1988	Bulgaria	3–0	France
28 September 1988	(15–8, 15–12, 15–11)

28 September 1988	Sweden	2–3	Netherlands
28 September 1988	(10–15, 15–13, 15–8, 11–15 ,14–16)

==== 7th place match ====
1 October 1988	Sweden	3–2	France
1 October 1988	(12–15, 15–5, 8–15, 15–12, 15–12)

==== 5th place match ====
1 October 1988	Netherlands	3–0	Bulgaria
1 October 1988	(15–6, 15–8, 15–10)

=== Final four ===
Semifinals
30 September
Soviet Union	3
Argentina	0
30 September
Brazil	0
United States	3

Gold medal match
2 October
Soviet Union	1
United States	3
Bronze medal match
2 October
Argentina	3
Brazil	2

==== Semifinals ====
30 September 1988	Brazil	0–3	United States
30 September 1988	(3–15, 5–15, 11–15)

30 September 1988	Soviet Union	3–0	Argentina
30 September 1988	(15–11, 17–15, 15–8)

==== Bronze medal match ====
2 October 1988	Argentina	3–2	Brazil
2 October 1988	(15–10, 15–17 ,15–8, 12–15 ,15–9)

==== Gold medal match ====
2 October 1988	Soviet Union	1–3	United States
2 October 1988	(15–13, 10–15, 4–15, 8–15)

== Final standing ==
Rank	Team
1st place, gold medalist(s)	United States
2nd place, silver medalist(s)	Soviet Union
3rd place, bronze medalist(s)	Argentina
4	Brazil
5	Netherlands
6	Bulgaria
7	Sweden
8	France
9	Italy
10	Japan
11	South Korea
12	Tunisia

1988 Men's Olympic champions

United States
2nd title

12–man roster
Troy Tanner, Dave Saunders, Jon Root, Bob Ctvrtlik, Douglas Partie, Steve Timmons, Craig Buck, Scott Fortune, Ricci Luyties, Jeff Stork, Eric Sato, Karch Kiraly (c)
Head coach
Marv Dunphy

== Medalists ==
Gold	Silver	Bronze
United States Troy Tanner; Dave Saunders; Jon Root; Bob Ctvrtlik; Douglas Partie; Steve Timmons; Craig Buck; Scott Fortune; Ricci Luyties; Jeff Stork; Eric Sato; Karch Kiraly (c) Head coach: Marv Dunphy	Soviet Union Yuriy Panchenko; Andrei Kuznetsov; Vyacheslav Zaytsev (c); Igor Runov; Vladimir Shkurikhin; Evgeni Krasilnikov; Raimonds Vilde; Valeri Losev; Yuri Sapega; Oleksandr Sorokalet; Yaroslav Antonov; Yuri Cherednik Head coach: Vladimir Kondra	Argentina Claudio Zulianello; Daniel Castellani (c); Esteban Martínez; Alejandro Diz; Daniel Colla; Javier Weber; Hugo Conte; Waldo Kantor; Raúl Quiroga; Jon Uriarte; Esteban de Palma; Juan Cuminetti Head coach: Luis Muchaga

== Awards ==
- Most valuable player
  (United States) Karch Kiraly
- Best spiker
  (Italy) Andrea Gardini
- Best blocker
  (United States) Steve Timmons
- Best server
  (Netherlands) Ron Zwerver
- Best digger
  (Japan) Eizaburo Mitsuhashi
- Best setter
  (Italy) Ferdinando De Giorgi
- Best receiver
  (United States) Bob Ctvrtlik

== See also ==
- Volleyball at the Summer Olympics
- Volleyball at the 1988 Summer Olympics – Women's tournament
