= Volleyball at the 1988 Summer Olympics =

Volleyball at the Games of the XXIV Olympiad
- Venue: Jamsil Gymnasium, Hanyang University Gymnasium and Saemaul Sports Hall
- Dates: September 17 – October 2, 1988
- No. of events: 2
- Competitors: 238 (143 men, 95 women)

Volleyball at the 1988 Summer Olympics was represented by two events: men's team and women's team.

== Medal table ==
Rank	Nation	Gold	Silver	Bronze	Total
1	Soviet Union	1	1	0	2
2	United States	1	0	0	1
3	Peru	0	1	0	1
4	Argentina	0	0	1	1
4	China	0	0	1	1
Totals (5 entries)		2	2	2	6

== Medal summary ==
Event	Gold	Silver	Bronze
Men's indoor	United States; Troy Tanner; David Saunders; Jonathan Root; Bob Ctvrtlik; Robert Partie; Steve Timmons; Craig Buck; Scott Fortune; Ricci Luyties; Jeffrey Stork; Eric Sato; Karch Kiraly (c)	Soviet Union; Yuri Panchenko; Andrei Kuznetsov; Vyacheslav Zaytsev (c); Igor Runov; Vladimir Shkurikhin; Yevgeni Krasilnikov; Raimundas Vilde; Valeri Losev; Yuri Sapega; Oleksandr Sorokalet; Yaroslav Antonov; Yuri Cherednik	Argentina; Claudio Zulianello; Daniel Castellani (c); Esteban Martinez; Alejandro Diz; Daniel Colla; Javier Weber; Hugo Conte; Waldo Kantor; Raul Quiroga; Jon Uriarte; Esteban de Palma; Juan Cuminetti
Women's indoor	Soviet Union; Valentina Ogiyenko; Yelena Volkova; Marina Kumysh; Irina Smirnova; Tatyana Sidorenko; Irina Parkhomchuk; Tatyana Kraynova; Olga Shkurnova; Marina Nikulina; Yelena Ovchinnikova; Olga Krivosheyeva; Svetlana Korytova	Peru; Luisa Cervera; Alejandra de la Guerra; Denisse Fajardo; Miriam Gallardo; Rosa García; Sonia Heredia; Katherine Horny; Natalia Málaga; Gabriela Pérez del Solar; Cecilia Tait; Gina Torrealva; Cenaida Uribe	China; Guo-Jun Li; Hong Zhao; Yu-Zhu Hou; Ya-Jun Wang; Xi-Lan Yang; Huijuan Su; Ying Jiang; Yong-Mei Cui; Xiao-Jun Yang; Mei-Zhu Zheng; Dan Wu; Yue-Ming Li
