= Argentina at the 1908 Summer Olympics =

- IOC code: ARG
- NOC: Argentine Olympic Committee

in London
- Competitors: 1 in 1 sport
- Medals: Gold 0 Silver 0 Bronze 0 Total 0

Summer Olympics appearances (overview)
- 1900; 1904; 1908; 1912; 1920; 1924; 1928; 1932; 1936; 1948; 1952; 1956; 1960; 1964; 1968; 1972; 1976; 1980; 1984; 1988; 1992; 1996; 2000; 2004; 2008; 2012; 2016; 2020; 2024; 2028

Argentina at the 1908 Summer Olympics in London, England was the nation's second appearance out of four editions of the Summer Olympic Games. Argentina did not participate at the 1896 Summer Olympics and the boycotted 1904 Summer Olympics. Horatio Torromé has the distinction of being Argentina's second one-man national representative, and debut Olympian in the Olympic sporting event of figure skating, ranking overall seventh. A one athlete team from Argentina competed at the 1900 Summer Olympics.

== Results by event ==
=== Figure skating ===
Athlete	Events	Score	Rank
Horatio Torromé	Men's singles	228.9	7

== Sources ==
- Cook, Theodore Andrea (1908). The Fourth Olympiad, Being the Official Report. London: British Olympic Association.
- De Wael, Herman (2001). "Top London 1908 Olympians". Herman's Full Olympians. Archived from the original on 12 July 2006.
