= Argentina at the 1920 Summer Olympics =

- IOC code: ARG
- NOC: Argentine Olympic Committee

in Antwerp
- Competitors: 1
- Flag bearer: Ángel Rodríguez
- Medals: Gold 0 Silver 0 Bronze 0 Total 0

Summer Olympics appearances (overview)
- 1900; 1904; 1908; 1912; 1920; 1924; 1928; 1932; 1936; 1948; 1952; 1956; 1960; 1964; 1968; 1972; 1976; 1980; 1984; 1988; 1992; 1996; 2000; 2004; 2008; 2012; 2016; 2020; 2024

Argentina at the 1920 Summer Olympics in Antwerp, Belgium was the nation's third appearance out of six editions of the Summer Olympic Games. Argentina last participated at the 1908 Summer Olympics. Argentina sent to the 1920 Summer Olympics another team of one repeating the trend from its representative teams of 1900 and 1908 Summer Olympics. The national team was organized under the auspices of the Athletic Federation of Chile.

== Boxing ==
Ángel Rodríguez made Argentina's Summer Olympic Games debut in the sport of boxing being the nation's only boxing representative at the 1920 Games. He was defeated in the first round of competition.

Boxer	Weight class	Round of 32	Round of 16	Quarterfinals	Semifinals	Final / Bronze match	
Boxer	Weight class	Opposition Score	Opposition Score	Opposition Score	Opposition Score	Opposition Score	Rank
Ángel Rodríguez	Featherweight	Olsen (NOR); L	did not advance				16

Opponent nation	Wins	Losses	Percent
Norway	0	1	.000
Total	0	1	.000

Round	Wins	Losses	Percent
Round of 32	0	1	.000
Round of 16	0	0	–
Quarterfinals	0	0	–
Semifinals	0	0	–
Final	0	0	–
Bronze match	0	0	–
Total	0	1	.000
