= Mariano Silva =

Argentine field hockey player

Mariano Silva (born 18 December 1969) is an Argentine former field hockey player who competed in the 1988 Summer Olympics.
