= Raimonds Vilde =

Latvian volleyball player (born 1962)

Personal information
- Full name: Raymonds Vilde
- Born: 19 August 1962 (age 64); Riga, Latvian SSR, Soviet Union
- Height: 200 cm (6 ft 7 in)

Volleyball information
- Position: Middle blocker
- Number: 7

National team
1984–1989; 1995	Soviet Union; Latvia
Honours
Men's volleyball
Representing Soviet Union
Olympic Games
Silver medal – second place	1988 Seoul	Team
World Championship
Silver medal – second place	1986 France	Team
Goodwill Games
Gold medal – first place	1986 Moscow
European Championship
Gold medal – first place	1985 Netherlands

Raimonds Vilde (born 19 August 1962) is a Latvian volleyball coach and former volleyball player who played in the 1988 Summer Olympics in Seoul. He was born in Riga.

In 1988, Vilde was part of the Soviet team that won the silver medal in the Olympic tournament. He played six matches.

== Coaching ==
Vilde was the head coach of the Latvian men's national volleyball team. He received the "Role Model in Sports" award during the Latvian Yearly Sports Awards ceremony in December 2012.
