= Otto Schmitt (field hockey) =

Argentine field hockey player

Personal information
- Born: January 28, 1965 (age 61)
Medal record
Men's Field hockey
Representing Argentina
Pan American Games
Silver medal – second place	1987 Indianapolis	Team

Otto Pablo Schmitt Schefelis (born January 28, 1965) is a male former field hockey goalkeeper from Argentina. He competed for his native country at the 1988 Summer Olympics, finishing in 8th place. He was succeeded as a first choice goalie by Emanuel Roggero.
