= Aldo Ayala =

Argentine field hockey player

Aldo Ayala (born 10 November 1958) is an Argentine former field hockey player who competed in the 1988 Summer Olympics and in the 1992 Summer Olympics.
