= Eric Sato =

American volleyball player (born 1966)

Personal information
- Full name: Eric Anthony Sato
- Born: May 5, 1966 (age 60); Santa Monica, California, U.S.
- Height: 5 ft 11 in (180 cm)
- Education: Pepperdine University

Volleyball information
- Position: Defensive specialist
- Number: 11 (1988); 14 (1992)

National team
1986–1994	United States
Medal record
Men's volleyball
Representing the United States
Olympic Games
Gold medal – first place	1988 Seoul	Indoor
Bronze medal – third place	1992 Barcelona	Indoor
World Championship
Gold medal – first place	1986 France	Indoor
Bronze medal – third place	1994 Greece	Indoor
FIVB World Cup
Bronze medal – third place	1991 Japan	{{{2}}}
Pan American Games
Gold medal – first place	1987 Indianapolis	Indoor

Eric Anthony Sato (born May 5, 1966) is an American former volleyball player and two-time Olympian. Sato was a member of the United States national volleyball team that won the gold medal at the 1988 Summer Olympics in Seoul. He also played in the 1992 Summer Olympics in Barcelona and won a bronze medal. He was a defensive specialist, and was widely considered to be the best defensive player in the world. After the Olympics, he played professional beach volleyball.

Though 5 ft 11 in (1.80 m) in height, Sato's 41 in (1.0 m) vertical jump allowed him to be an effective spiker for the national team, including from the back row.

== College ==
Sato played college volleyball at Pepperdine University.

== Personal life ==
Sato's sister Liane played volleyball with the United States women's national team in both the 1988 and 1992 Summer Olympics, capturing a bronze medal in 1992. For the Sato family, a capstone was the 1988 Olympics, when Eric and Liane were both competing, and their brother Gary was a coach on the men's volleyball team.
