= Troy Tanner =

American volleyball player

Personal information
- Born: Troy Richard Tanner; October 31, 1963 (age 62); Hacienda Heights, California, U.S.
- Height: 6 ft 4 in (193 cm)
- Education: Pepperdine University

Volleyball information
- Position: Setter (college); Outside hitter (college and national team)
- Number: 1

National team
1985–1990	United States
Medal record
Men's volleyball
Representing the United States
Olympic Games
Gold medal – first place	1988 Seoul	Indoor
Goodwill Games
Silver medal – second place	1986 Moscow

Troy Richard Tanner (born October 31, 1963) is an American former volleyball player and Olympic gold medalist. He was a member of the United States men's national volleyball team that won the gold medal at the 1988 Summer Olympics in Seoul.

== Early life ==
Tanner attended Los Altos High School in Hacienda Heights, California.

== College ==
Tanner played college volleyball for Pepperdine University after being recruited by legendary coach Marv Dunphy. He started as a setter and then was switched to outside hitter. Tanner helped the Waves win NCAA Championships in 1985 and 1986, defeating USC on each occasion.

Tanner was inducted into the Pepperdine Hall of Fame in 2011.

== Club volleyball ==
After his Olympic appearance in 1988, Tanner played in the professional indoor leagues in Italy, Croatia, and Japan.

== Beach volleyball ==
From 1988 to 1999, Tanner played beach volleyball primarily on the AVP tour. He was the AVP Rookie of the Year in 1992. In his career as a beach volleyball player, he won $470,000 in prizes.

== Coaching ==
Tanner served an assistant volleyball coach for the Brigham Young University men's volleyball team. He also coached Misty May-Treanor and Kerri Walsh during their gold medal run in the 2008 Olympics.

== Personal life ==
Tanner's father, Rolf Tanner, was a sports enthusiast and encouraged his sons to compete at a high level in their respective sports.

Tanner is also the owner of the Tstreet Volleyball Club, which trains in Irvine, California. Troy is married to Desiree Tanner and has three children: sons Carson and Riley, and daughter Bailey. Troy's hobbies include surfing, playing guitar, and ping pong.

== Awards ==
- Two-time NCAA Champion — 1985, 1986
- Goodwill Games silver medal — 1986
- Olympic gold medal — 1988
- AVP Rookie of the Year — 1992
- Pepperdine Hall of Fame — 2011
