= María Alejandra Tucat =

Argentine field hockey player

Personal information
- Born: October 21, 1961 (age 64)
Medal record
Women's field hockey
Representing Argentina
Pan American Games
Gold medal – first place	1987 Indianapolis	Team

María Alejandra Tucat (born October 21, 1961) is a retired female field hockey player from Argentina. She was a member of the Women's National Team that finished in seventh place at the 1988 Summer Olympics in Seoul, South Korea after having won the gold medal the previous year at the Pan American Games in Indianapolis.
