= Lisandro Sugezky =

Argentine sports shooter

Personal information
- Nationality: Argentine
- Born: 8 June 1945 (age 79)

Sport
- Sport: Sports shooting

Lisandro Sugezky (born 8 June 1945) is an Argentine sports shooter. He competed in two events at the 1988 Summer Olympics.
