= Hanyang University Gymnasium =

Sports venue in Seoul, South Korea

Coordinates: 37.556537°N 127.049962°E

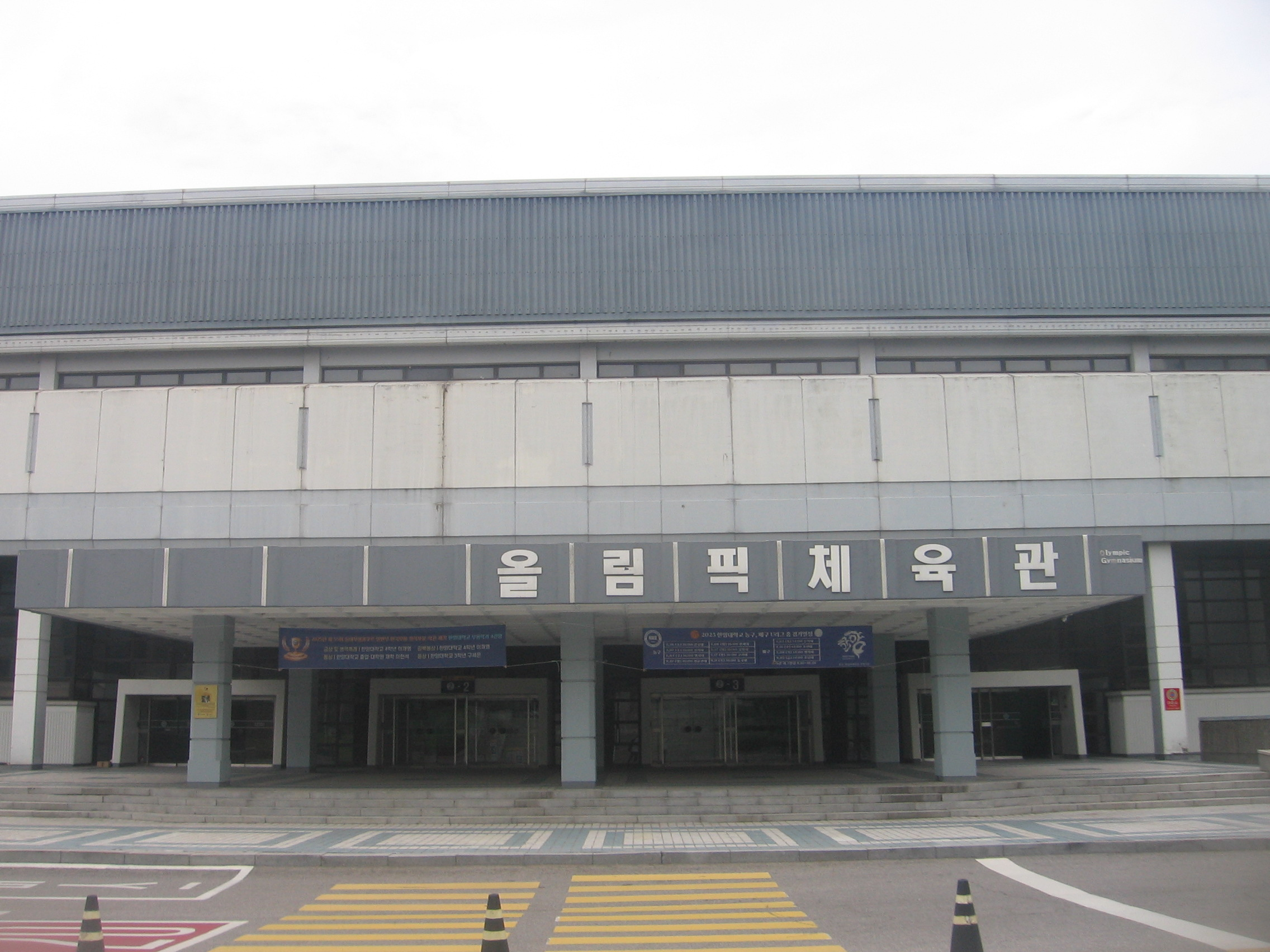
Hanyang University Gymnasium

Hanyang University Gymnasium is an indoor sporting arena located in Seoul, South Korea. The capacity of the arena is 8,000 people and was built in 1986 to host the volleyball events at 1986 Asian Games and during the 1988 Summer Olympics. It hosted a sport stacking task on The Amazing Race 29 and The Amazing Race Australia 4. An indoor gymnasium with two stories underground and four stories above ground with reinforced concrete truss structure built on the campus of Hanyang University in Haengdang-dong, Seongdong District. It is a building of 31,247 m^{2} with a building area of 31,247 m^{2} and its size is 80m * 80m * 26m. The floor of the stadium is 50m * 36m (Maple tree floor) and the practice field: 37m * 21m (2 sides). In the 1988 Seoul Olympics, it is offered as a volleyball arena. Evening games are possible.

== See also ==
- List of indoor arenas in South Korea
