= Emanuel Roggero =

Argentine field hockey player

Personal information
- Full name: Emanuel Ernesto Roggero Otamendi
- Born: November 1, 1964 (age 61)
Medal record
Men's field hockey
Representing Argentina
Pan American Games
Gold medal – first place	1991 Havana	Team
Silver medal – second place	1987 Indianapolis	Team

Emanuel Ernesto Roggero Otamendi (born November 1, 1964) is a male former field hockey goalkeeper from Argentina. He competed for his native country at two consecutive Summer Olympics, starting in 1988. He succeeded Otto Schmitt as a first choice goalie in the national squad.

During 2013 he coached the Argentina women's national field hockey team replacing Marcelo Garraffo. After less than a year on the job, he resigned and Carlos Retegui was chosen to coach both the women and men's simultaneously.
