= Saemaul Sports Hall =

Sports venue in Seoul, South Korea

Saemaul Sports Hall (Korean: 새마을운동본부 연수원) is an indoor arena located in Seoul, South Korea. Built from June 1984 to June 1986, it hosted the volleyball preliminaries for the 1988 Summer Olympics. At the Asian Games two years earlier, the hall hosted the judo competitions.
