= Daniel Hernández (footballer, born 1970) =

Argentine footballer

Personal information
- Full name: Daniel Aníbal Hernández
- Date of birth: February 5, 1970 (age 56)
- Place of birth: San Miguel de Tucumán, Argentina
- Height: 1.73 m (5 ft 8 in)
- Position: Midfielder

Youth career
- 1985: Independiente
- 1986–1987: Atlético Concepción

Senior career*
Years	Team	Apps	(Gls)
1987–1990	Atlético Concepción	–	(–)
1988–1989	→ Independiente (loan)	2	(0)
1990	→ Bolívar (loan)	total	(↓)
1991–1994	Bolívar	75	(12)
1993–1994	→ Atlético Tucumán (loan)	39	(10)
1994–1996	San Martín Tucumán	76	(16)
1996–1997	Godoy Cruz	32	(9)
1997–1998	Talleres	13	(1)
1999–2000	San Martín Tucumán	total	(↑)
2000	Juventud Antoniana	7	(3)
2001	Coquimbo Unido	8	(0)
2002–2003	Atlético Tucumán	16	(6)
2005	Independiente La Rioja	12	(1)
2005	Concepción	6	(1)
2006	Destroyers	1	(0)

International career
1987–1989	Argentina U20		
1988	Argentina Olympic		

Managerial career
- 2010: Mitre
- 2011–2012: Deportivo Aguilares
- 2012: Villa Cubas
- 2014: Instituto Santiago
- 2015–2016: Villa Cubas
- 2017: La Nicaragua
- * Club domestic league appearances and goals

Daniel Aníbal Hernández (born 5 February 1970 in Tucumán, Argentina) is an Argentine former footballer who played as a midfielder for clubs in Argentina, Bolivia and Chile.

== Teams ==
=== Player ===
- (Argentina) Atlético Concepción 1987–1988
- (Argentina) Independiente 1988–1989
- (Argentina) Atlético Concepción 1989
- (Bolivia) Bolívar 1990–1992
- (Argentina) Atlético Tucumán 1993–1994
- (Argentina) San Martín de Tucumán 1994–1996
- (Argentina) Godoy Cruz 1996–1997
- (Argentina) Talleres de Córdoba 1997–1998
- (Argentina) San Martín de Tucumán 1999–2000
- (Argentina) Juventud Antoniana 2000
- (Chile) Coquimbo Unido 2001
- (Argentina) Atlético Tucumán 2002–2003
- (Argentina) Independiente de La Rioja 2005
- (Argentina) Concepción FC 2005
- (Bolivia) Destroyers 2006

=== Coach ===
- (Argentina) Mitre 2010
- (Argentina) Deportivo Aguilares 2011–2012
- (Argentina) Villa Cubas 2012
- (Argentina) Instituto Santiago 2014
- (Argentina) Villa Cubas 2015–2016
- (Argentina) La Nicaragua 2017

== International ==
- Argentina U20 1987–1989
- Argentina Olympic 1988

== Personal life ==
Hernández is of Chilean descent from a maternal family from Coquimbo.

His father, José Agustín, nicknamed Víbora (Viper), was a football forward who played for Tucumán Central, La Florida and Estación Experimental. In addition, his brother Pedro played for Central Norte.

He is the uncle of the football midfielder Pedro Pablo Hernández, who represented the Chile national team.

== Honours ==
Atlético Concepción

- Liga Tucumana de Fútbol: 1989
