= Jon Root =

American volleyball player

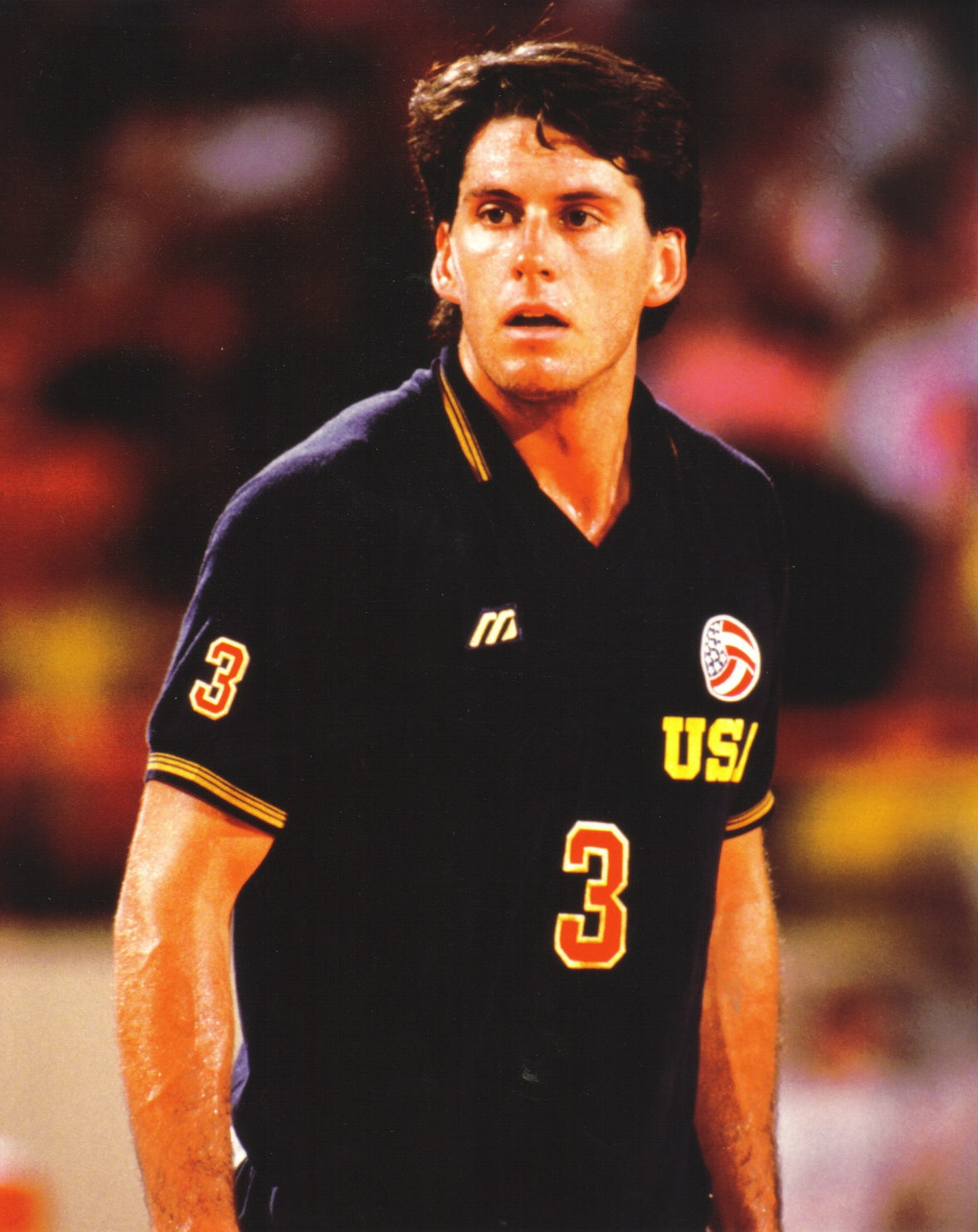

Personal information
- Born: Jonathan Edward Root; July 10, 1964 (age 62); Los Angeles, California, U.S.
- Height: 195 cm (6 ft 5 in)
- Education: Stanford University

Volleyball information
- Position: Middle blocker / Outside hitter
- Number: 3

National team
1986–1994	United States
Medal record
Men's volleyball
Representing the United States
Olympic Games
Gold medal – first place	1988 Seoul	Team
Pan American Games
Gold medal – first place	1987 Indianapolis	Team

Jonathan Edward Root (born July 10, 1964) is an American former volleyball player. Root was a member of the United States men's national volleyball team that won the gold medal at the 1988 Summer Olympics in Seoul. He also helped the national team win the gold medal at the 1987 Pan American Games in Indianapolis. He was known for his quickness and power as a hitter.

== College ==
Root played college volleyball for Stanford University, where he was a three-time AVCA All-American. He graduated from Stanford in 1986.

In 2002, Root was inducted into the Stanford Athletics Hall of Fame.

== Coaching ==
Root has coached the Red Rock Volleyball Club in Redwood City, California.

== Awards ==
- Three-time AVCA All-American
- Pan American Games gold medal — 1987
- Olympic gold medal — 1988
- Stanford Athletics Hall of Fame — 2002
