= Andrea Fioroni =

Argentine field hockey player (born 1969)

Personal information
- Full name: Andrea Paula Fioroni
- Born: January 11, 1969 (age 57)
Medal record
Women's field hockey
Representing Argentina
Pan American Games
Gold medal – first place	1987 Indianapolis	Team

Andrea Paula Fioroni (born January 11, 1969) is a retired female field hockey player from Argentina. She was a member of the Women's National Team that finished in seventh place at the 1988 Summer Olympics in Seoul, South Korea. A year earlier she claimed the gold medal at the Pan American Games in Indianapolis.
