= Luca Masso =

Argentine field hockey player (born 1994)

Personal information
- Nationality: Argentine, Belgian
- Born: July 17, 1994 (age 32)
- Height: 1.86 m (6 ft 1 in)
- Weight: 82 kg (181 lb)

Sport
- Country: Argentina
- Sport: Field Hockey
Medal record
Representing Argentina
Olympic Games
Gold medal – first place	2016 Rio de Janeiro	team

Luca Masso (born 17 July 1994) is an Argentine field hockey player. He was part of the Argentine team that won gold in men's field hockey at the 2016 Summer Olympics in Rio de Janeiro. He also holds Belgian nationality.

Masso was born in Brussels, Belgium to an Argentine-born father, Eduardo, and a Belgian mother, Sabrina Merckx. He comes from a family of sportsmen. His father Eduardo Masso is a former tennis player who represented Belgium at the Davis Cup. His maternal grandfather is the Belgian former cycling champion Eddy Merckx, a five-time Tour de France winner. His maternal uncle, Axel Merckx, is an Olympic bronze medalist in cycling for Belgium.
