= Ángel Médici =

Argentine footballer

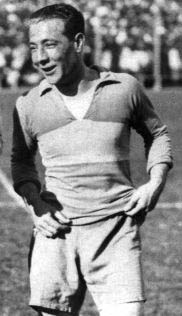

Personal information
- Full name: Ángel Segundo Médici
- Date of birth: 20 December 1897
- Place of birth: Buenos Aires, Argentina
- Date of death: 9 August 1971 (Aged 73)
- Position: Defender

Senior career*
Years	Team	Apps	(Gls)
?	San Telmo	?	(?)
?–1921	Atlanta	?	(?)
1922–1931	Boca Juniors	173	(2)

International career
1922–1928	Argentina	34	(0)
- * Club domestic league appearances and goals as of March 2008

Olympic medal record

Men's Football
Silver medal – second place	1928 Amsterdam	Team competition

Ángel Segundo Médici (20 December 1897 – 9 August 1971) was an Argentine association football defender who represented the Argentina national football team on 34 occasions between 1922 and 1928.

== Playing career ==
Médici started his career playing for San Telmo and then moved to Club Atlético Atlanta. In 1922 he joined Boca Juniors and made his first appearance for the Argentina national team. During his time with the club, Boca Juniors won four league titles and a number of minor cup competitions.

Médici appeared in five Copa América squads for Argentina between 1922 and 1926. He was part of the winning team in 1925.

In 1928 he was a member of the Argentine team which won the silver medal in the 1928 Olympic football tournament.

== Club titles ==
Season	Team	Title
1923	Boca Juniors	Primera División Argentina
1923	Boca Juniors	Copa Ibarguren
1924	Boca Juniors	Primera División Argentina
1924	Boca Juniors	Copa Ibarguren
1925	Boca Juniors	Copa Competencia
1926	Boca Juniors	Primera División Argentina
1926	Boca Juniors	Copa Estímulo
1930	Boca Juniors	Primera División Argentina

== International title ==
Season	Team	Title
1925	Argentina	Copa América

== Managerial career ==
Médici went on to become a football manager, working as the coach of Barracas Central amongst others.
