= Enrique Gainzarain =

Argentine footballer

Personal information
- Date of birth: 7 December 1904
- Place of birth: Argentina
- Date of death: 18 July 1972 (Aged 67)
- Position: Inside right

Youth career
- 1914–1920: River Plate

Senior career*
Years	Team	Apps	(Gls)
1920–1924	River Plate	?	(?)
1928–1932	Ferro Carril Oeste	37	(15)
1933	Gimnasia La Plata	7	(5)

International career
1928	Argentina	1	(0)
- * Club domestic league appearances and goals as of March 2008

Olympic medal record

Men's Football
Silver medal – second place	1928 Amsterdam	Team competition

Enrique A. Gainzarain (7 December 1904 – 18 July 1972) was an Argentine association football player who played a single official game for Argentina in the 1928 Summer Olympics.

Gainzarain joined River Plate at the age of 10 and made his senior debut in 1920. He went on to play for Ferro Carril Oeste and Gimnasia y Esgrima de La Plata.
