= Laura del Colle =

Argentine field hockey goalkeeper (born 1983)

Personal information
- Full name: Laura Andrea del Colle
- Born: May 30, 1983 (age 43) Rosario, Santa Fe, Argentina
- Height: 1.77 m (5 ft 9 1/2 in)

Sport
- Sport: Field hockey
- Position: Goalkeeper
- Club: Universitario de Rosario
Senior career
Years	Team	Caps	Goals
???–Present	Universitario de Rosario	-	-
National team
Years	Team	Caps	Goals
2010–2013	Argentina	6	-
Medal record
Women's Field hockey
Representing Argentina
Summer Olympics
Silver medal – second place	2012 London	Team
Champions Trophy
Gold medal – first place	2012 Rosario	Team
- Updated on October 1, 2012

Laura Andrea del Colle (born 1983) is an Argentine field hockey player. At the 2012 Summer Olympics, she competed for the Argentina women's national field hockey team in the women's event and won the silver medal. Laura has also won the Champions Trophy in 2012.
