= Saúl Calandra =

Argentine footballer (1904–1973)

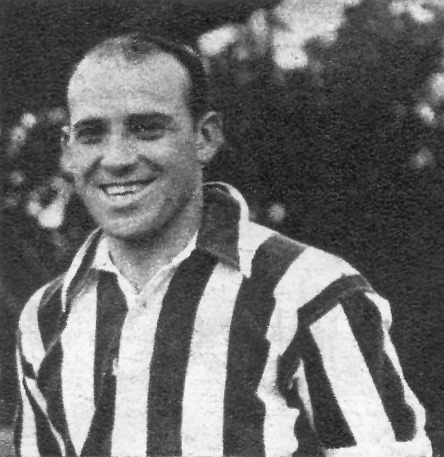

Personal information
- Date of birth: 22 October 1904
- Place of birth: La Plata, Argentina
- Date of death: 14 May 1973 (Aged 68)
- Position: Midfielder

Senior career*
Years	Team	Apps	(Gls)
- Estudiantes de La Plata

International career
1927–1928	Argentina	3	(0)
- * Club domestic league appearances and goals as of March 2008

Olympic medal record

Men's Football
Silver medal – second place	1928 Amsterdam	Team competition

Saúl H. Calandra (22 October 1904 – 14 May 1973) was an Argentine football (soccer) midfielder who competed in the 1928 Olympic games. He was a member of the Argentine team, which won the silver medal in the football tournament. He was also a runner up in the 1927 Copa Lipton. Calandra played club football with Estudiantes de La Plata.
