= Octavio Díaz =

Argentine footballer

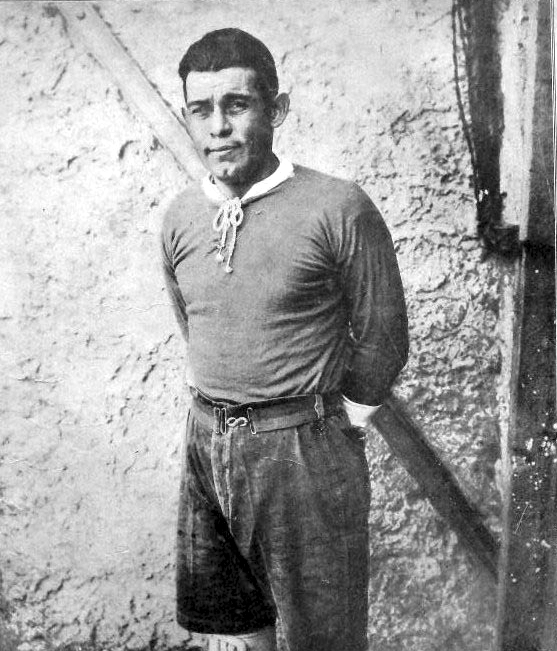
- Díaz in 1926

Personal information
- Full name: Octavio Juan Díaz
- Date of birth: 7 October 1900
- Place of birth: Argentina
- Date of death: 12 November 1977 (Aged 77)
- Position: Goalkeeper

Senior career*
Years	Team	Apps	(Gls)
1919–1931	Rosario Central	?	(?)

International career
1926–1928	Argentina	9	(0)
- * Club domestic league appearances and goals as of March 2008

Olympic medal record

Men's Football
Silver medal – second place	1928 Amsterdam	Team competition

Octavio Juan Díaz (7 October 1900 – 12 November 1977) was an Argentine Association football goalkeeper who played for the Argentina national football team.

Díaz played club football for Rosario Central, where he won a few local titles and a national cup in 1920. He represented Argentina on 9 occasions between 1926 and 1928. He was a member of the Argentine team, which won the 1927 South American Championship and the silver medal in the 1928 Olympic football tournament.
