= Javier Weber =

Argentine volleyball player and coach

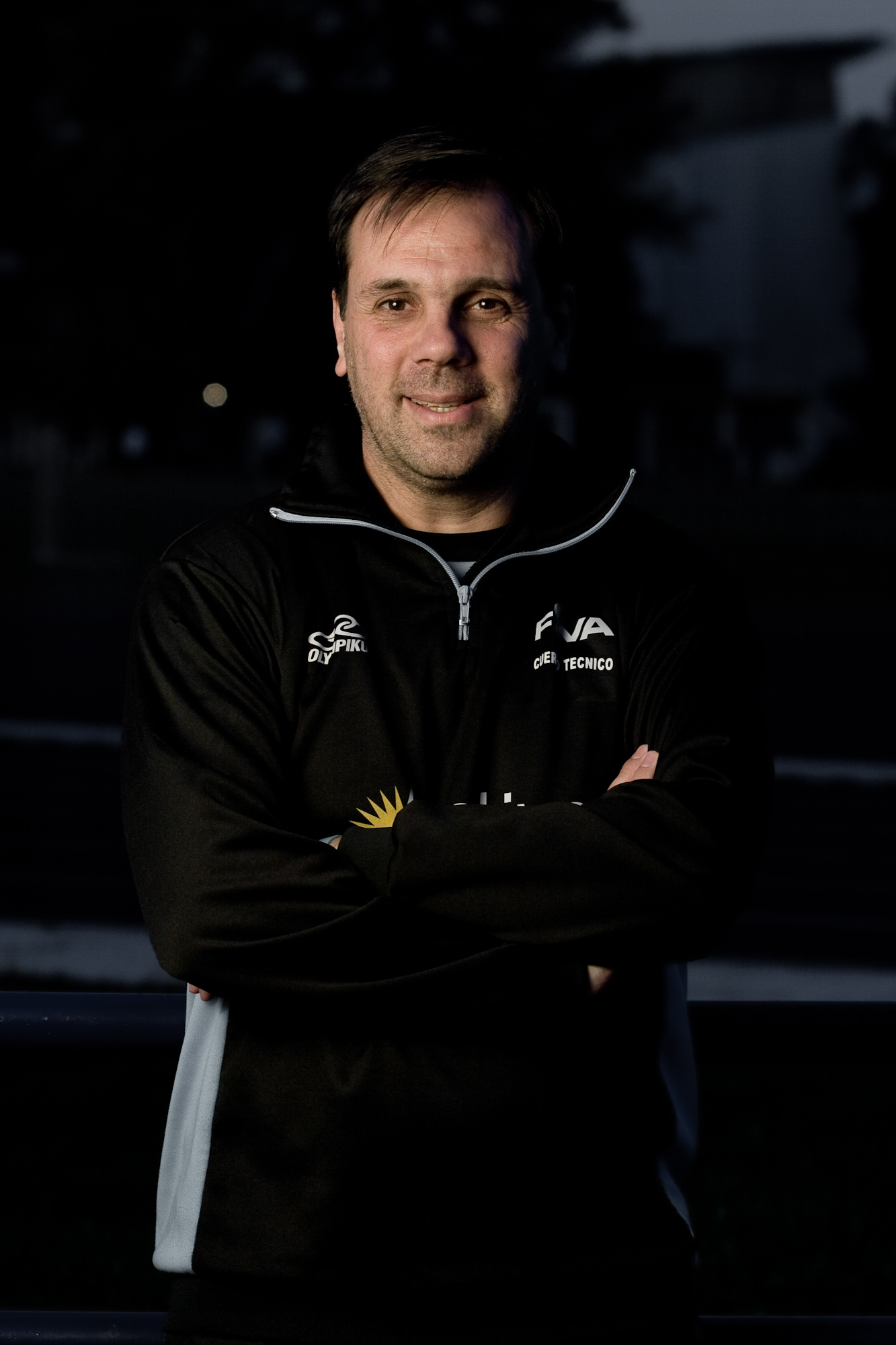

Personal information
- Full name: Carlos Javier Weber
- Born: 6 January 1966 (age 60); Buenos Aires, Argentina
- Height: 1.81 m (5 ft 11 in)

Coaching information
- Current team: USA; JT Thunders
Previous teams coached
Years	Teams
2002–2005; 2005–2006; 2006–2013; 2009–2013; 2013–2014; 2014–2020; 2020–2021; 2021–2024; 2022– 2024–	Unisul Esporte Clube; Panathinaikos; Bolívar Vóley; Argentina; Dinamo Krasnodar; Bolívar Vóley; Vôlei Natal; AZS Olsztyn; USA (AC); JT Thunders

Volleyball information
- Position: Setter

National team
1985–2002	Argentina (613)
Honours
Men's volleyball
Representing Argentina
Olympic Games
Bronze medal – third place	1988 Seoul
Pan American Games
Gold medal – first place	1995 Mar del Plata
Bronze medal – third place	1991 Havana
CSV South American Championship
Silver medal – second place	1989 Curitiba
Silver medal – second place	1991 São Paulo
Silver medal – second place	1993 Córdoba
Silver medal – second place	1995 Porto Alegre
Silver medal – second place	1999 Córdoba
Bronze medal – third place	1985 Caracas
Bronze medal – third place	1997 Caracas
Head coach Argentina
CSV South American Championship
Silver medal – second place	2011 Cuiabá
Silver medal – second place	2013 Cabo Frio

Carlos Javier Weber (born 6 January 1966) is an Argentine professional volleyball coach and former player, a former member of the Argentina national team. Weber represented his native country in three Olympic Games: Seoul 1988 (bronze medal), Atlanta 1996, and Sydney 2000. He also took part in five World Championship editions (1986, 1990, 1994, 1998, 2002). He serves as head coach for JT Thunders and an assistant coach for the U.S. national team.

== Personal life ==
Javier Weber was born in Buenos Aires. He began playing volleyball at the age of 16 in the local club, River Plate. Weber has a son named Martín, who is also a volleyball player.

== Honours ==
=== As a player ===
- Domestic
  - 1997–98 Brazilian Championship, with Ulbra/Diadora
  - 1998–99 Brazilian Championship, with Ulbra/Pepsi

=== As a coach ===
- CSV South American Club Championship
  - Argentina 2010 – with Bolívar Vóley
  - Montes Claros 2017 – with Bolívar Vóley
- Domestic
  - 2003–04 Brazilian Championship, with Unisul/Florianópolis
  - 2005–06 Greek Championship, with Panathinaikos
  - 2006–07 Argentine Cup, with Bolívar Vóley
  - 2006–07 Argentine Championship, with Bolívar Vóley
  - 2007–08 Argentine Cup, with Bolívar Vóley
  - 2007–08 Argentine Championship, with Bolívar Vóley
  - 2008–09 Argentine Cup, with Bolívar Vóley
  - 2008–09 Argentine Championship, with Bolívar Vóley
  - 2009–10 Argentine Cup, with Bolívar Vóley
  - 2009–10 Argentine Championship, with Bolívar Vóley
  - 2014–15 Argentine Cup, with Bolívar Vóley
  - 2016–17 Argentine Championship, with Bolívar Vóley
  - 2018–19 Argentine Championship, with Bolívar Vóley
  - 2020–21 Brazilian SuperCup, with Vôlei Taubaté
  - 2020–21 Brazilian Championship, with Vôlei Taubaté

Sporting positions
Preceded by (Argentina) Jon Uriarte	Head coach of Argentina; 2009–2013	Succeeded by (Argentina) Julio Velasco
