= Esteban de Palma =

Argentine volleyball player (born 1967)

Personal information
- Full name: José Esteban de Palma
- Nationality: Argentine
- Born: 18 January 1967 (age 59)
- Height: 1.96 m (6 ft 5 in)

Volleyball information
- Position: Opposite
- Number: 11

National team
1984–1989	Argentina
Honours
Men's volleyball
Representing Argentina
Olympic Games
Bronze medal – third place	1988 Seoul	Team
CSV South American Championship
Silver medal – second place	1989 Curitiba
Bronze medal – third place	1985 Caracas

José Esteban de Palma (born 18 January 1967) is a former volleyball player from Argentina who represented his native country at the 1988 Summer Olympics in Seoul. There he won the bronze medal with the men's national team, after also having competed at the 1984 Summer Olympics in Los Angeles.
