= Claudio Zulianello =

Argentine volleyball player (born 1965)

Personal information
- Full name: Claudio F. Zulianello
- Born: May 29, 1965 (age 61); Buenos Aires, Argentina
- Height: 1.98 m (6 ft 6 in)

Volleyball information
- Position: Middle blocker
- Number: 1

National team
1985–1990	Argentina
Honours
Men's volleyball
Representing Argentina
Olympic Games
Bronze medal – third place	1988 Seoul	Team
CSV South American Championship
Silver medal – second place	1989 Curitiba
Bronze medal – third place	1985 Caracas

Claudio F. Zulianello (born May 29, 1965) is a former Argentine volleyball player who represented his native country at the 1988 Summer Olympics in Seoul, winning the bronze medal with the Argentine men's national volleyball team.
