= Daniel Colla =

Argentine volleyball player (born 1964)

Personal information
- Full name: Daniel Miguel Colla
- Born: February 23, 1964 (age 62); Santa Fe, Argentina
- Height: 1.94 m (6 ft 4 in)

Volleyball information
- Position: Middle blocker
- Number: 5

National team
1984–1989	Argentina
Honours
Men's volleyball
Representing Argentina
Olympic Games
Bronze medal – third place	1988 Seoul	Team
CSV South American Championship
Silver medal – second place	1989 Curitiba

Daniel Miguel Colla (born February 23, 1964) is a retired volleyball player from Argentina who represented his native country in two Summer Olympics. After having finished in sixth place at the 1984 Summer Olympics in Los Angeles, he was a member of the men's national team that won the bronze medal four years later in Seoul.
