= Hugo Conte =

Argentine volleyball player and coach

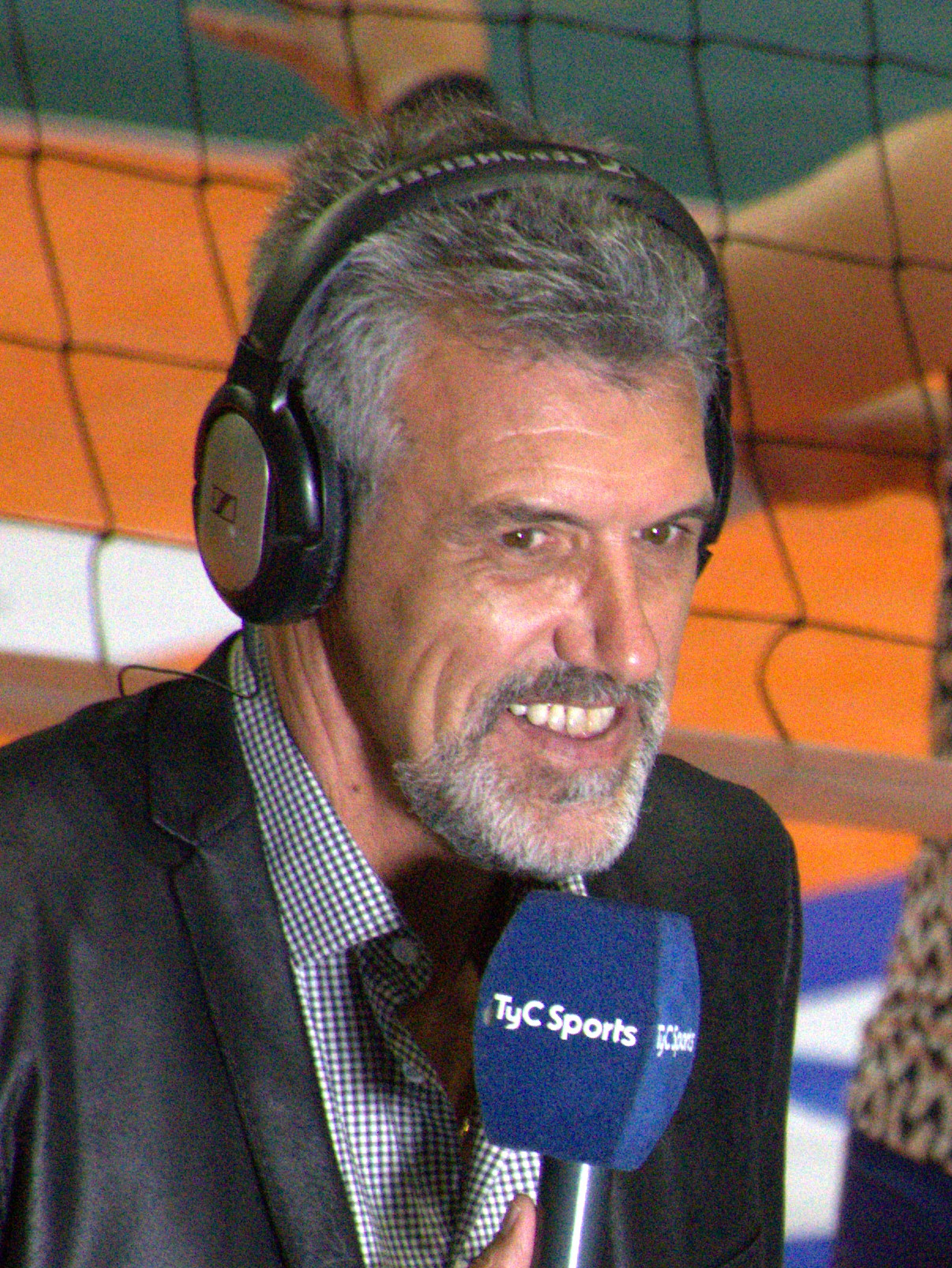
- Conte in 2023

Personal information
- Born: 14 April 1963 (age 63) Buenos Aires, Argentina
- Occupations: Volleyball coach, player
- Height: 1.97 m (6 ft 6 in)
Medal record
Men's volleyball
Representing Argentina
Olympic Games
Bronze medal – third place	1988 Seoul	Team
World Championship
Bronze medal – third place	1982 Argentina
Pan American Games
Bronze medal – third place	1983 Caracas	Team

Hugo Néstor Conte (born 14 April 1963) is a volleyball coach and retired player from Argentina who represented his native country in three Summer Olympics. He was born in Buenos Aires. He currently coaches Volley Cavriago in Italy.

After having finished in sixth place at the 1984 Summer Olympics in Los Angeles, Conte was a member of the men's national team that claimed the bronze medal four years later in Seoul, South Korea. Twelve years later, he was on the squad, ending up in fourth place at the 2000 Summer Olympics. He is considered to be one of the eight greatest volleyball players of all time, and the best Argentinian player, next to Waldo Kantor.

With the Italian club team Santal Parma, he won the 1984 European Champions League.

== Personal life ==
Hugo's son, Facundo, also became an international volleyball player.

== Clubs history ==
Club	Country	From	To
Ferro Carril Oeste	Argentina	1978-1979	1981-1982
AS Cannes	France	1982-1983	1982-1983
Pallavolo Parma	Italy	1983-1984	1983-1984
Victor Village Ugento	Italy	1984-1985	1985-1986
Ferro Carril Oeste	Argentina	1986-1987	1986-1987
Acqua Pozzillo Catane	Italy	1987-1988	1989-1990
Carimonte Modena	Italy	1990-1991	1992-1993
Alpitour Diesel Cuneo	Italy	1993-1994	1993-1994
Tally Milan	Italy	1994-1995	1994-1995
Playa Catania	Italy	1995-1996	1997-1998
Ferro Carril Oeste	Argentina	1998-1999	1999-2000
Pallavolo Parma	Italy	2000-2001	2000-2001
