= Eduardo Martínez (volleyball) =

Argentine volleyball player

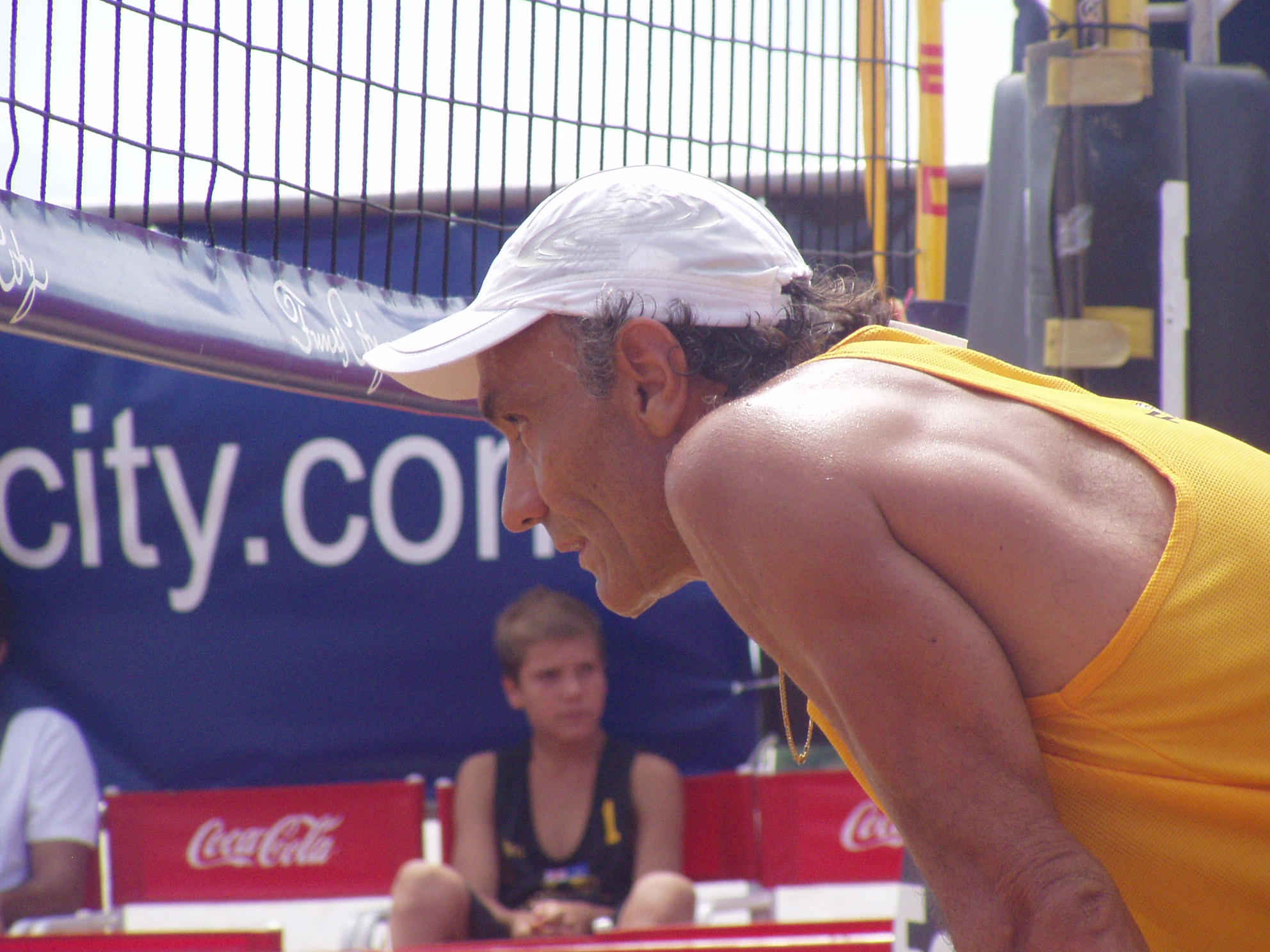

Personal information
- Full name: Eduardo Esteban Martínez
- Nickname: Mono
- Born: 25 September 1961 (age 65); Necochea, Argentina
- Height: 1.92 m (6 ft 4 in)

Volleyball information
- Position: Outside hitter
- Number: 3

National team
1981–1990	Argentina
Honours
Men's volleyball
Representing Argentina
Olympic Games
Bronze medal – third place	1988 Seoul	Indoor
World Championship
Bronze medal – third place	1982 Argentina
Pan American Games
Bronze medal – third place	1983 Caracas	Indoor
CSV South American Championship
Silver medal – second place	1981 Santiago
Silver medal – second place	1989 Curitiba

Eduardo Esteban "Mono" Martínez (born 25 September 1961 in Necochea) is a retired volleyball player from Argentina. He represented his country in four Summer Olympics, starting in 1984 (Los Angeles).

Martínez was a member of the men's national indoor team that won the bronze medal at the 1988 Summer Olympics in Seoul. In the 1990s, he started a career in beach volleyball, partnering with Martín Conde in the 1996 and 2000 Summer Olympics.
