= Raúl Quiroga =

Argentine volleyball player (born 1962)

Personal information
- Full name: Raúl Nicolás Quiroga
- Born: 26 January 1962 (age 64); San Juan, Argentina
- Height: 1.97 m (6 ft 6 in)

Volleyball information
- Position: Opposite
- Number: 9

National team
1981–1990	Argentina
Honours
Men's volleyball
Representing Argentina
Olympic Games
Bronze medal – third place	1988 Seoul	Team
World Championship
Bronze medal – third place	1982 Argentina
Pan American Games
Bronze medal – third place	1983 Caracas	Team
CSV South American Championship
Silver medal – second place	1981 Santiago
Silver medal – second place	1983 São Paulo
Silver medal – second place	1987 Montevideo
Silver medal – second place	1989 Curitiba

Raúl Nicolás Quiroga (born 26 January 1962, in San Juan Province, Argentina) is a retired volleyball player from Argentina who represented his native country in two Summer Olympics. After having finished in sixth place at the 1984 Summer Olympics in Los Angeles, he was a member of the men's national team that claimed the bronze medal four years later in Seoul.

== Personal life ==
Quiroga's nephew, Rodrigo Quiroga, is a current national volleyball team captain. His brother, Daniel, also played volleyball, and his son Gonzalo plays for national youth team.
