= Waldo Kantor =

Argentine volleyball player (born 1960)

Personal information
- Full name: Waldo Ariel Kantor
- Born: 11 January 1960 (age 66) Buenos Aires, Argentina
- Height: 1.78 m (5 ft 10 in)
- Weight: 93 kg (205 lb)

Volleyball information
- Position: Setter
- Number: 1 (national team)

National team
- Years: Team
- 1981–1990: Argentina
Honours
Men's volleyball
Representing Argentina
Olympic Games
Bronze medal – third place	1988 Seoul	Team
World Championship
Bronze medal – third place	1982 Argentina
Pan American Games
Bronze medal – third place	1983 Caracas	Team
CSV South American Championship
Silver medal – second place	1981 Santiago
Silver medal – second place	1983 São Paulo
Silver medal – second place	1989 Curitiba

Waldo Ariel Kantor (born 11 January 1960) is a retired volleyball player from Argentina, who represented his native country at the 1984 Summer Olympics in Los Angeles, California and the 1988 Summer Olympics in Seoul. In Seoul, Kantor won the bronze medal with the men's national team. He started played soccer at All Boys, and then decided to play volleyball at IL Peretz from Villa Lynch.

With Ferro Carril Oeste, Kantor won the Morgan Cup of 1979, and the national championships of 1980 and 1981. Kantor received two Konex Awards volleyball merit diplomas (1990 and 2000).

== Coaching ==
After retirement, Kantor became a successful coach with Argentine first division Bolivar Buenos Aires, winning the 2007–08 championship. He also played at Mendele from Loma Hermosa, where he defeated different teams from the area, such as Villa Piagio, Los Matreros, and River.

== Club history ==
Club	Country	From	To
Club I.L. Peretz Villa Lynch	Argentina	1974–1975	1977–1978
Ferro Carril Oeste	Argentina	1978–1979	1981–1982
Sienne	Italy	1982–1983	1982–1983
Jesi	Italy	1983–1984	1984–1985
Pallavolo Catania	Italy	1985–1986	1985–1986
Córdoba	Spain	1986–1987	1986–1987
Pallavolo Catania	Italy	1987–1988	1989–1990
Pallavolo Modena	Italy	1990–1991	1992–1993
Montpellier UC Volley-Ball	France	1993–1994	1993–1994
Banespa/São Paulo	Brazil	1994–1995	1994–1995
Mendele	Loma Hermosa	1995–1996	1995–1996
Paris Volley	France	1996–1997	1996–1997
