= Alejandro Diz =

Argentine volleyball player (born 1965)

Personal information
- Nationality: Argentine
- Born: March 26, 1965 (age 61)
- Height: 1.96 m (6 ft 5 in)

Volleyball information
- Position: Outside hitter
- Number: 6 (1984); 4 (1988)

National team
1983–1988	Argentina
Honours
Men's volleyball
Representing Argentina
Olympic Games
Bronze medal – third place	1988 Seoul	Team
Pan American Games
Bronze medal – third place	1983 Caracas	Team
CSV South American Championship
Bronze medal – third place	1985 Caracas

Alejandro Diz (born March 26, 1965) is a former volleyball player from Argentina who represented his native country in two Summer Olympics. After having finished in sixth place at the 1984 Summer Olympics in Los Angeles, he was a member of the men's national team four years later in the 1988 Summer Olympics in Seoul, winning the bronze medal.
