= Juan Cuminetti =

Argentine volleyball player (born 1967)

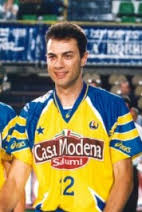
- Cuminetti with Trentino in 2005

Personal information
- Full name: Juan Carlos Cuminetti
- Born: 27 May 1967 (age 59); Rosario, Santa Fe, Argentina
- Height: 1.99 m (6 ft 6 in)

Volleyball information
- Position: Opposite
- Number: 11

National team
1985–1998	Argentina
Honours
Men's volleyball
Representing Argentina
Olympic Games
Bronze medal – third place	1988 Seoul	Team
Pan American Games
Bronze medal – third place	1991 Havana	Team
CSV South American Championship
Silver medal – second place	1991 Osasco
Bronze medal – third place	1985 Caracas

Juan Carlos Cuminetti (born 27 May 1967) is a retired volleyball player from Argentina. He was a member of the men's national team that won the bronze medal in Seoul, wearing the number 11 jersey.
