= Jon Uriarte =

Argentine volleyball player and coach (born 1961)

Jon Emili Uriarte
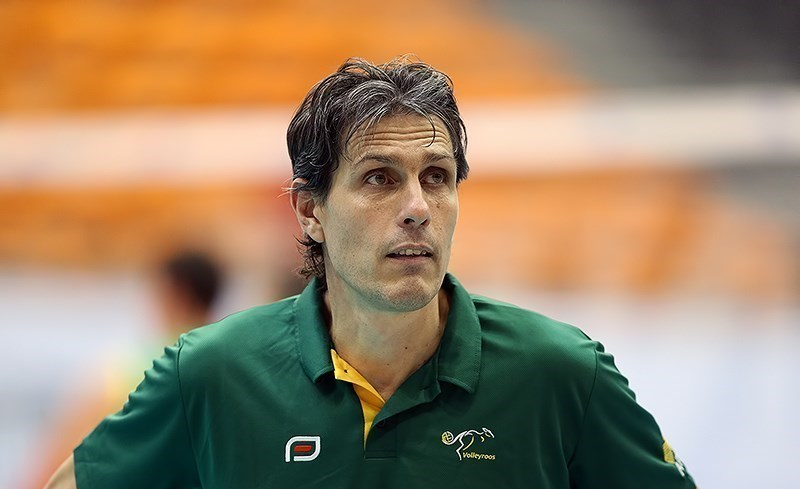
- May 2014

Personal information
- Born: 15 October 1961 (age 64) Buenos Aires, Argentina
- Occupation: Volleyball coach
- Height: 1.99 m (6 ft 6 in)
Medal record
Men's volleyball
Representing Argentina
Olympic Games
Bronze medal – third place	1988 Seoul	Team
World Championship
Bronze medal – third place	1982 Argentina
Pan American Games
Bronze medal – third place	1983 Caracas	Team

Jon Emili Uriarte (born 15 October 1961) is an Argentine former volleyball player and current coach who represented his native country at the 1988 Summer Olympics in Seoul, winning the bronze medal with the men's national team. He also won the bronze medal at the 1982 World Championship held in Argentina.

Uriarte, born in Buenos Aires, played eight seasons in Europe, in the Italian A1 first division, in France, and in the Netherlands. He won three Argentine league titles, and played 11 years for the Argentine national team, including in four World Championships and two Olympic Games.

== Coaching ==
As a head coach, Uriarte worked in Azul VC from 1991 to 2001, playing six Argentine League finals and winning the championship four times: 1991–92, 1992–93, 1993–94, and 2000-01.

In 2001, Uriarte became Australia's head coach, leading the team to qualifying for the Olympics in 2004 for the first time. Uriarte also established the first full-time Junior Development Program at the Australian Institute of Sport (www.ais.gov.au).

In 2005, Uriarte moved to Brazil to coach Telemig/Minas Tenis Clube, winning the 2005 Paulista Championship, and leading the team to second place in the Brazilian Super League regular season in 2006.

In April 2006, Uriarte was appointed as a new Argentine head coach.

After Uriarte developed a new generation a players in Argentina, he took the position of head coach of Vibo Valentia, Italy in A1 division.

In May 2011, Uriarte was again hired by the Australian Volleyball Federation, reprising his role as head coach of the Australian men's volleyball team. In June 2012, at the AOGQ tournament played in Japan, he led the Australian team to qualify for the Olympic Games for the second time.

== Personal life ==
After having worked in different parts of the world, besides Spanish, Uriarte can speak English, Italian, French, and Portuguese.
