= 1989 Men's South American Volleyball Championship =

1989 Men's South American Championship
Tournament details
- Host country: Brazil
- Dates: 23–30 September
- Teams: 4
- Venue: 1 (in 1 host city)

Final positions
- Champions: Brazil (17th title)

The 1989 Men's South American Volleyball Championship, the 18th tournament, took place in 1989 in Curitiba (Brazil).

== Final positions ==
Place	Team
	Brazil
	Argentina
	Venezuela
4	Peru
