= List of flag bearers for Argentina at the Olympics =

Argentina at the Olympics
- IOC code: ARG
- NOC: Argentine Olympic Committee
- Website: www.coarg.org.ar (in Spanish)
- Medals: Gold 22 Silver 27 Bronze 31 Total 80

Summer appearances
- 1900; 1904; 1908; 1912; 1920; 1924; 1928; 1932; 1936; 1948; 1952; 1956; 1960; 1964; 1968; 1972; 1976; 1980; 1984; 1988; 1992; 1996; 2000; 2004; 2008; 2012; 2016; 2020; 2024

Winter appearances
- 1928; 1932–1936; 1948; 1952; 1956; 1960; 1964; 1968; 1972; 1976; 1980; 1984; 1988; 1992; 1994; 1998; 2002; 2006; 2010; 2014; 2018; 2022; 2026

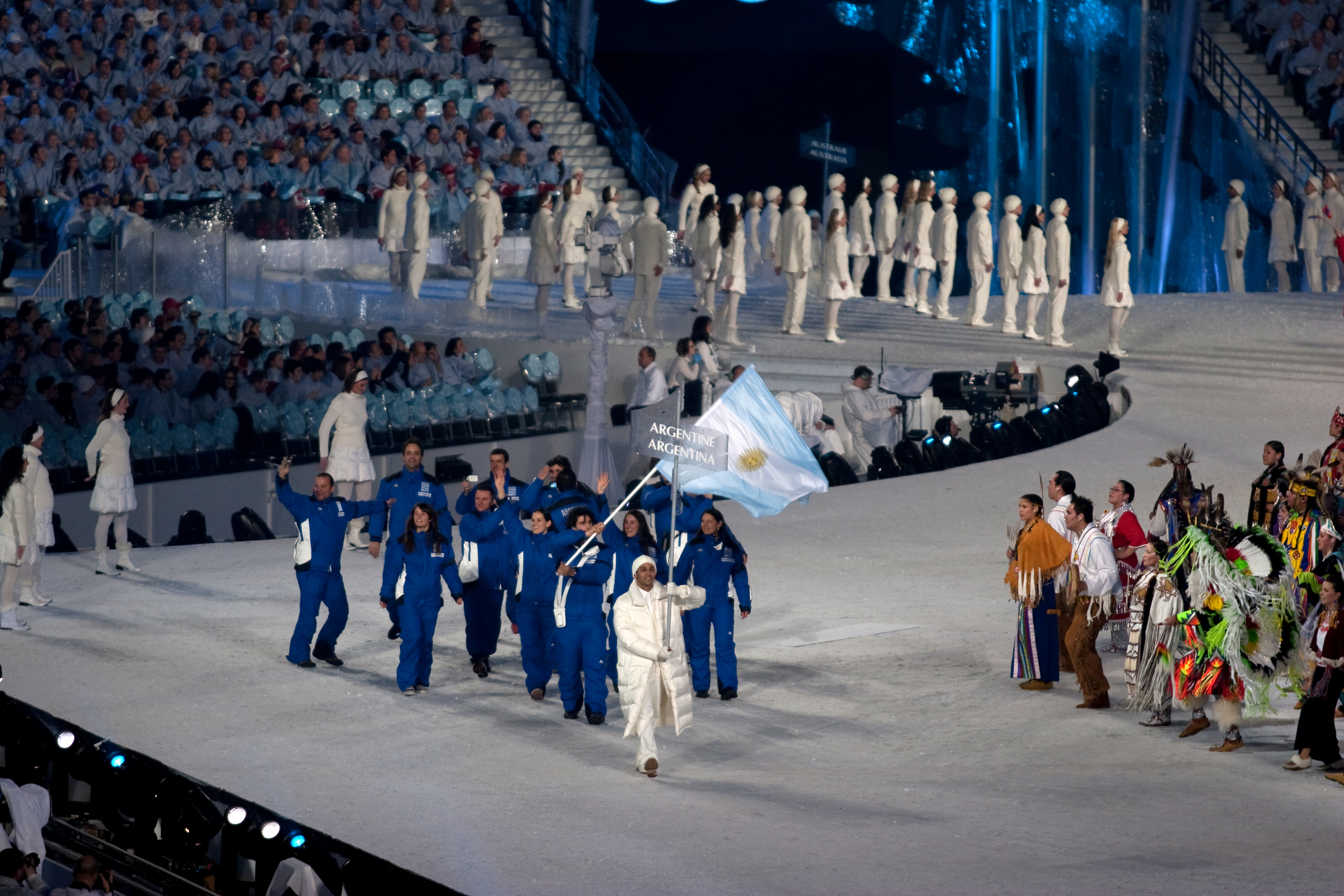
Cristian Simari Birkner carrying the Argentine flag at the 2010 Winter Olympics in Vancouver.

This is a list of flag bearers who have represented Argentina at the Olympics. Flag bearers carry the national flag of their country at the opening ceremony of the Olympic Games.

Key

Born outside Argentina

#	Event year	Season	Flag bearer	Sex	Province/country	Sport	Ref.
1	1924	Summer	Enrique Thompson	M	Entre Ríos	Athletics	
2	1928	Summer	Héctor Méndez	M	—	Boxing	
3	1932	Summer	Alberto Zorrilla	M	City of Buenos Aires	Swimming	
4	1936	Summer	Juan Carlos Zabala	M	Santa Fe	Athletics	
5	1948	Summer	Alfredo Yantorno	M	Buenos Aires (province)	Swimming	
6	1952	Summer	Delfo Cabrera	M	Santa Fe	Athletics	
7	1956	Summer	Isabel Avellán	F	—	Athletics	
8	1960	Winter	María Cristina Schweizer	F	City of Buenos Aires	Alpine skiing	
9	1960	Summer	Cristina Hardekopf	F	City of Buenos Aires	Swimming	
10	1964	Summer	Jeannette Campbell	F	France	Swimming	
11	1968	Summer	Carlos Moratorio	M	Corrientes	Equestrianism	
12	1972	Summer	Carlos César Delía	M	Entre Ríos	Equestrianism	
13	1976	Summer	Hugo Aberastegui	M	Santa Fe	Rowing	
14	1980	Winter	Carlos Abel Balda	M	—	Biathlon	
15	1984	Summer	Ricardo Ibarra	M	City of Buenos Aires	Rowing	
16	1988	Winter	Julio Moreschi	M	Río Negro	Cross-country skiing	
17	1988	Summer	Gabriela Sabatini	F	City of Buenos Aires	Tennis	
18	1992	Winter	Carolina Eiras	F	—	Alpine skiing	
19	1992	Summer	Marcelo Garraffo	M	City of Buenos Aires	Field hockey	
20	1994	Winter	María Giro	F	City of Buenos Aires	Biathlon	
21	1996	Summer	Carolina Mariani	F	City of Buenos Aires	Judo	
22	1998	Winter	Carola Calello	F	Río Negro	Alpine skiing	
23	2000	Summer	Carlos Espínola	M	Corrientes	Sailing	
24	2002	Winter	Cristian Simari Birkner	M	Río Negro	Alpine skiing	
25	2004	Summer	Carlos Espínola	M	Corrientes	Sailing	
26	2006	Winter	María Belén Simari Birkner	F	Río Negro	Alpine skiing	
27	2008	Summer	Manu Ginóbili	M	Buenos Aires (province)	Basketball	
28	2010	Winter	Cristian Simari Birkner	M	Río Negro	Alpine skiing	
29	2012	Summer	Luciana Aymar	F	Santa Fe	Field hockey	
30	2014	Winter	Cristian Simari Birkner	M	Río Negro	Alpine skiing	
31	2016	Summer	Luis Scola	M	City of Buenos Aires	Basketball	
32	2018	Winter	Sebastiano Gastaldi	M	Italy	Alpine skiing	
33	2020	Summer	Santiago Lange	M	Buenos Aires (province)	Sailing	
33	2020	Summer	Cecilia Carranza	F	Santa Fe	Sailing	
34	2022	Winter	Francesca Baruzzi	F	Río Negro	Alpine skiing	
34	2022	Winter	Franco Dal Farra	M		Cross-country skiing	
35	2024	Summer	Luciano De Cecco	M	Santa Fe	Volleyball	
35	2024	Summer	Rocío Sánchez Moccia	F	City of Buenos Aires	Field hockey	

== See also ==
- Argentina at the Olympics
