= Argentina at the 1980 Winter Olympics =

- IOC code: ARG
- NOC: Argentine Olympic Committee
- Website: www.coarg.org.ar (in Spanish)

in Lake Placid
- Competitors: 13 (men) in 3 sports
- Medals: Gold 0 Silver 0 Bronze 0 Total 0

Winter Olympics appearances (overview)
- 1928; 1932–1936; 1948; 1952; 1956; 1960; 1964; 1968; 1972; 1976; 1980; 1984; 1988; 1992; 1994; 1998; 2002; 2006; 2010; 2014; 2018; 2022; 2026

Argentina competed at the 1980 Winter Olympics in Lake Placid, United States.

== Alpine skiing ==
Men

Athlete	Event	Race 1		Race 2		Total	
Athlete	Event	Time	Rank	Time	Rank	Time	Rank
Guillermo Giumelli	Downhill					2:00.10	38
Janez Flere	Downhill					1:59.01	37
Marcelo Martínez	Downhill					1:58.04	36
Norberto Quiroga	Downhill					1:54.31	31
Marcelo Martínez	Giant Slalom	1:31.17	51	1:34.41	47	3:05.58	47
Guillermo Giumelli	Giant Slalom	1:30.62	49	1:31.64	44	3:02.26	44
Janez Flere	Giant Slalom	1:28.27	45	1:30.12	42	2:58.39	40
Norberto Quiroga	Giant Slalom	1:27.16	41	1:28.49	36	2:55.65	37
Guilermo Giumelli	Slalom	n/a	?	DNF	–	DNF	–
Norberto Quiroga	Slalom	1:05.09	37	57.82	26	2:02.91	27
Ricardo Klenk	Slalom	1:04.67	36	1:00.16	29	2:04.83	31
Ivan Bonacalza	Slalom	1:03.23	33	1:00.38	30	2:03.61	29

== Biathlon ==
Men

Event	Athlete	Misses ^{1}	Time	Rank
10 km Sprint	Jorge Salas	6	47:12.58	49
10 km Sprint	Luis Ríos	5	44:51.18	48
10 km Sprint	Raúl Abella	5	44:40.55	47

Event	Athlete	Time	Penalties	Adjusted time ^{2}	Rank
20 km	Raúl Abella	DNF	–	DNF	–
20 km	Jorge Salas	DNF	–	DNF	–
20 km	Luis Ríos	1'34:26.50	21	1'55:26.50	47

Men's 4 x 7.5 km relay

Athletes	Race		
Athletes	Misses ^{1}	Time	Rank
Luis Ríos; Jorge Salas; Raúl Abella; Demetrio Velázquez	DNF	DNF	–

^{1} A penalty loop of 150 metres had to be skied per missed target.
^{2} One minute added per close miss (a hit in the outer ring), two minutes added per complete miss.

== Cross-country skiing ==
Men

Event	Athlete	Race	
Event	Athlete	Time	Rank
15 km	Matías José Jerman	55:50.61	61
15 km	Martín Tomás Jerman	53:38.47	60
15 km	Marcos Luis Jerman	52:02.42	56
30 km	Marcos Luis Jerman	1'47:56.17	50
