= Argentina at the 1948 Winter Olympics =

- IOC code: ARG
- NOC: Argentine Olympic Committee
- Website: www.coarg.org.ar (in Spanish)

in St. Moritz
- Competitors: 9 (men) in 2 sports
- Medals: Gold 0 Silver 0 Bronze 0 Total 0

Winter Olympics appearances (overview)
- 1928; 1932–1936; 1948; 1952; 1956; 1960; 1964; 1968; 1972; 1976; 1980; 1984; 1988; 1992; 1994; 1998; 2002; 2006; 2010; 2014; 2018; 2022; 2026

Argentina competed at the 1948 Winter Olympics in St. Moritz, Switzerland. It was only the second time that Argentinian athletes had competed at the Winter Games, after missing the 1932 Winter Olympics and the 1936 Winter Olympics.

== Alpine skiing ==
Men

| Athlete | Event | Race 1 | | Race 2 | | Total | |
| Athlete | Event | Time | Rank | Time | Rank | Time | Rank |
|---|---|---|---|---|---|---|---|
| Julio Cernuda | Downhill | | | | | 4:46.4 | 95 |
| Pablo Rosenkjer | Downhill | | | | | 4:36.2 | 93 |
| Gino de Pellegrín | Downhill | | | | | 4:25.2 | 91 |
| Otto Jung | Downhill | | | | | 4:09.3 | 85 |
| Luis de Ridder | Downhill | | | | | 3:50.2 | 68 |
| Justo del Carril | Downhill | | | | | 3:46.2 | 63 |
| Otto Jung | Slalom | 1:54.1 | 56 | 1:21.6 | 46 | 3:15.7 | 53 |
| Pablo Rosenkjer | Slalom | 1:53.7 (+0:05) | 55 | 1:34.2 | 55 | 3:27.9 | 56 |
| Luis de Ridder | Slalom | 1:32.2 | 44 | 1:20.2 | 41 | 2:52.4 | 42 |
| Gino de Pellegrín | Slalom | 1:29.8 | 40 | 1:23.5 | 47 | 2:53.3 | 43 |

Men's combined

The downhill part of this event was held along with the main medal event of downhill skiing. For athletes competing in both events, the same time was used (see table above for the results). The slalom part of the event was held separate from the main medal event of slalom skiing (included in table below).

| Athlete | Slalom | | | Total (downhill + slalom) | |
| Athlete | Time 1 | Time 2 | Rank | Points | Rank |
|---|---|---|---|---|---|
| Luis de Ridder | 2:46.3 | 1:20.9 | 67 | 80.11 | 63 |
| Pablo Rosenkjer | 1:45.3 | 1:34.6 | 59 | 84.62 | 64 |
| Otto Jung | 1:45.2 | 1:26.1 | 55 | 66.05 | 56 |
| Gino de Pellegrín | 1:40.8 | 1:27.2 | 50 | 73.29 | 60 |

== Bobsleigh ==
| Sled | Athletes | Event | Run 1 | | Run 2 | | Run 3 | | Run 4 | | Total | |
| Sled | Athletes | Event | Time | Rank | Time | Rank | Time | Rank | Time | Rank | Time | Rank |
|---|---|---|---|---|---|---|---|---|---|---|---|---|
| ARG-1 | Marcello de Ridder; Héctor Tomasi | Two-man | 1:29.2 | 16 | 1:28.5 | 16 | 1:27.8 | 15 | 1:27.3 | 15 | 5:52.8 | 15 |

| Sled | Athletes | Event | Run 1 | | Run 2 | | Run 3 | | Run 4 | | Total | |
| Sled | Athletes | Event | Time | Rank | Time | Rank | Time | Rank | Time | Rank | Time | Rank |
|---|---|---|---|---|---|---|---|---|---|---|---|---|
| ARG-1 | Justo del Carril; Salvador Correa; Marcello de Ridder; Héctor Tomasi | Four-man | 1:20.5 | 12 | 1:23.4 | 12 | 1:24.5 | 12 | 1:24.5 | 10 | 5:32.9 | 12 |
