= Argentina at the 1952 Winter Olympics =

- IOC code: ARG
- NOC: Argentine Olympic Committee
- Website: www.coarg.org.ar (in Spanish)

in Oslo
- Competitors: 12 (11 men, 1 woman) in 2 sports
- Medals: Gold 0 Silver 0 Bronze 0 Total 0

Winter Olympics appearances (overview)
- 1928; 1932–1936; 1948; 1952; 1956; 1960; 1964; 1968; 1972; 1976; 1980; 1984; 1988; 1992; 1994; 1998; 2002; 2006; 2010; 2014; 2018; 2022; 2026

Argentina competed at the 1952 Winter Olympics in Oslo, Norway.

== Alpine skiing ==
Men

Athlete	Event	Race 1		Race 2		Total	
Athlete	Event	Time	Rank	Time	Rank	Time	Rank
Aristeo Benavídez	Downhill					DSQ	–
Carlos Eiras	Downhill					DSQ	–
Gino de Pellegrin	Downhill					4:02.0	70
Otto Jung	Downhill					3:34.9	62
Pablo Rosenkjer	Downhill					3:02.9	47
Luis de Ridder	Downhill					3:01.8	46
Gino de Pellegrín	Giant Slalom					3:09.5	66
Otto Jung	Giant Slalom					3:03.7	61
Luis de Ridder	Giant Slalom					3:00.9	56
Pablo Rosenkjer	Giant Slalom					2:55.9	49
Pablo Rosenkjer	Slalom	1:23.3	70	did not advance			
Otto Jung	Slalom	1:21.7	67	did not advance			
Luis de Ridder	Slalom	1:21.0	64	did not advance			
Francisco de Ridder	Slalom	1:16.0	55	did not advance			

Women

Athlete	Event	Race 1		Race 2		Total	
Athlete	Event	Time	Rank	Time	Rank	Time	Rank
Ana María Dellai	Downhill					2:00.3	28
Ana María Dellai	Giant Slalom					2:29.7	31
Ana María Dellai	Slalom	1:14.4	24	1:15.3	32	2:29.7	29

== Bobsleigh ==
Sled	Athletes	Event	Run 1		Run 2		Run 3		Run 4		Total	
Sled	Athletes	Event	Time	Rank	Time	Rank	Time	Rank	Time	Rank	Time	Rank
ARG-1	Carlos Tomasi; Robert Bordeu; Carlos Sareisian; Héctor Tomasi	Four-man	1:20.15	13	1:19.81	6	1:19.35	10	1:19.54	7	5:18.85	8
