= Argentina at the 1964 Winter Olympics =

- IOC code: ARG
- NOC: Argentine Olympic Committee
- Website: www.coarg.org.ar (in Spanish)

in Innsbruck
- Competitors: 12 (11 men, 1 woman) in 3 sports
- Medals: Gold 0 Silver 0 Bronze 0 Total 0

Winter Olympics appearances (overview)
- 1928; 1932–1936; 1948; 1952; 1956; 1960; 1964; 1968; 1972; 1976; 1980; 1984; 1988; 1992; 1994; 1998; 2002; 2006; 2010; 2014; 2018; 2022; 2026

Argentina competed at the 1964 Winter Olympics in Innsbruck, Austria.

== Alpine skiing ==
Men

Athlete	Event	Race	
Athlete	Event	Time	Rank
Jorge Abelardo Eiras	Downhill	4:34.51	76
Pedro Klempa	Downhill	2:47.07	64
Carlos Perner	Giant Slalom	2:19.25	63
Osvaldo Ancinas	Giant Slalom	2:15.06	57
Pedro Klempa	Giant Slalom	2:12.88	52
Jorge Abelardo Eiras	Giant Slalom	2:08.38	43

Men's slalom

Athlete	Qualifying				Final					
Athlete	Time 1	Rank	Time 2	Rank	Time 1	Rank	Time 2	Rank	Total	Rank
Pedro Klempa	DNF	–	DNF	–	did not advance					
Jorge Abelardo Eiras	DNF	–	1:04.57	41	did not advance					
Manuel Mena	1:25.60	79	1:15.88	51	did not advance					
Osvaldo Ancinas	1:04.63	53	1:04.35	39	did not advance					

Women

Athlete	Event	Race 1		Race 2		Total	
Athlete	Event	Time	Rank	Time	Rank	Time	Rank
María Christina Schweizer	Giant Slalom					2:19.81	42
María Christina Schweizer	Slalom	53.43	28	58.45	25	1:51.88	24

== Bobsleigh ==
Sled	Athletes	Event	Run 1		Run 2		Run 3		Run 4		Total	
Sled	Athletes	Event	Time	Rank	Time	Rank	Time	Rank	Time	Rank	Time	Rank
ARG-1	Héctor Tomasi; Fernando Rodríguez	Two-man	1:07.59	16	1:09.20	19	1:07.36	14	1:07.72	15	4:31.87	18
ARG-2	Roberto José Bordeu; Hernán Agote	Two-man	1:10.15	21	1:08.45	17	1:11.33	19	1:10.26	19	4:40.19	19

Sled	Athletes	Event	Run 1		Run 2		Run 3		Run 4		Total	
Sled	Athletes	Event	Time	Rank	Time	Rank	Time	Rank	Time	Rank	Time	Rank
ARG-1	Héctor Tomasi; Carlos Alberto Tomasi; Hernán Agote; Fernando Rodríguez	Four-man	1:05.74	17	1:06.08	18	1:07.07	17	1:06.62	17	4:25.51	16

== Luge ==
Men

Athlete	Run 1		Run 2		Run 3		Run 4		Total	
Athlete	Time	Rank	Time	Rank	Time	Rank	Time	Rank	Time	Rank
Matiás Stinnes	n/a	?	n/a	?	DNF	–	–	–	DNF	–
