= Argentina at the 1976 Winter Olympics =

- IOC code: ARG
- NOC: Argentine Olympic Committee
- Website: www.coarg.org.ar (in Spanish)

in Innsbruck
- Competitors: 8 (men) in 2 sports
- Medals: Gold 0 Silver 0 Bronze 0 Total 0

Winter Olympics appearances (overview)
- 1928; 1932–1936; 1948; 1952; 1956; 1960; 1964; 1968; 1972; 1976; 1980; 1984; 1988; 1992; 1994; 1998; 2002; 2006; 2010; 2014; 2018; 2022; 2026

Argentina competed at the 1976 Winter Olympics in Innsbruck, Austria.

== Alpine skiing ==
Men

Athlete	Event	Race 1		Race 2		Total	
Athlete	Event	Time	Rank	Time	Rank	Time	Rank
Adrián Roncallo	Downhill					DNF	–
Carlos Alberto Martínez	Downhill					1:54.62	47
Juan Angel Olivieri	Downhill					1:52.76	39
Luis Rosenkjer	Downhill					1:50.87	31
Juan Angel Olivieri	Giant Slalom	2:01.08	63	DNF	–	DNF	–
Adrián Roncallo	Giant Slalom	2:00.16	62	2:00.46	40	4:00.62	42
Carlos Alberto Martínez	Giant Slalom	1:56.03	52	DNF	–	DNF	–
Luis Rosenkjer	Giant Slalom	1:53.98	41	1:54.18	32	3:48.16	32
Luis Rosenkjer	Slalom	DNF	–	–	–	DNF	–
Walter Dei Vecchi	Slalom	DNF	–	–	–	DNF	–
Carlos Alberto Martínez	Slalom	n/a	?	DNF	–	DNF	–
Juan Angel Olivieri	Slalom	1:05.90	26	DNF	–	DNF	–

== Cross-country skiing ==
Men

Event	Athlete	Race	
Event	Athlete	Time	Rank
15 km	Matías José Jerman	DNF	–
15 km	Martín Tomás Jerman	1'00:07.39	74
15 km	Marcos Luis Jerman	53:43.34	71
30 km	Marcos Luis Jerman	1'50:06.99	65
