= Tomasi =

Tomasi is both a surname and a given name. Notable people with the name include:

== Surname ==
- Carlos Tomasi (1930 — 2017), Argentine bobsledder
- Giuseppe Tomasi di Lampedusa (1896 – 1957), Sicilian writer
- St. Giuseppe Maria Tomasi (1649 – 1713), Italian cardinal and saint
- Héctor Tomasi, Argentine bobsledder
- Henri Tomasi (1901 - 1971), French composer and conductor.
- Mari Tomasi (1907-1965), American novelist
- Peter Tomasi, American comic book writer
- Pietro Tomasi Della Torretta (1873 – 1962), Italian politician and diplomat

== Given name ==
- Junior Tomasi Cama, New Zealand Rugby union player
- Tomasi Kanailagi, Fijian Methodist minister and political leader
- Tomasi Kulimoetoke I, king of Uvea, ruling from 1924 until 1928
- Tomasi Kulimoetoke II (1918 – 2007), Lavelua (King) of Wallis Island
- Sir Tomasi Puapua (born 1938), politician from Tuvalu
- Tomasi Sauqaqa, Fijian politician serving as Assistant Minister for Health from 2001 to 2006
- Tomasi Vakatora (1926 – 2006), Fijian politician who served as Speaker of the House of Representatives
- Tomasi Vuetilovoni, Fijian politician, current Minister for Tourism and Transport

== See also ==
- Tomasi–Kanade factorization
