= Argentina at the 2026 Winter Olympics =

- Flag of Argentina
- IOC code: ARG
- NOC: Argentine Olympic Committee
- Website: www.coarg.org.ar

in Milan and Cortina d'Ampezzo, Italy 6 February 2026 – 22 February 2026
- Competitors: 8 (3 men and 5 women) in 3 sports
- Flag bearers (opening): Franco Dal Farra & Francesca Baruzzi
- Flag bearers (closing): Franco Dal Farra & Verónica María Ravenna
- Medals: Gold 0 Silver 0 Bronze 0 Total 0

Winter Olympics appearances (overview)
- 1928; 1932–1936; 1948; 1952; 1956; 1960; 1964; 1968; 1972; 1976; 1980; 1984; 1988; 1992; 1994; 1998; 2002; 2006; 2010; 2014; 2018; 2022; 2026

Argentina competed at the 2026 Winter Olympics in Milan and Cortina d'Ampezzo, Italy, from 6 to 22 February 2026.

Franco Dal Farra & Francesca Baruzzi were the country's flagbearer during the opening ceremony. Meanwhile, Franco Dal Farra and Verónica María Ravenna were the country's flagbearer during the closing ceremony.

== Competitors ==
The following is the list of number of competitors participating at the Games per sport/discipline.

Sport	Men	Women	Total
Alpine skiing	1	2	3
Cross-country skiing	2	2	4
Luge	0	1	1
Total	3	5	8

== Alpine skiing ==
Argentina qualified one female and one male alpine skier through the basic quota and one female skier through the FIS point list.

Athlete	Event	Run 1		Run 2		Total	
Athlete	Event	Time	Rank	Time	Rank	Time	Rank
Tiziano Gravier	Men's giant slalom	1:18.45	27	1:11.85	26	2:30.30	26
Tiziano Gravier	Men's slalom	DNF					
Tiziano Gravier	Men's super-G	—N/a				1:29.06	28
Francesca Baruzzi Farriol	Women's giant slalom	1:06.83	36	1:12.32	29	2:19.15	29
Francesca Baruzzi Farriol	Women's super-G	—N/a				DNF	
Francesca Baruzzi Farriol	Women's slalom	DNF					
Nicole Begue	Women's downhill	—N/a				1:44.73	30
Nicole Begue	Women's giant slalom	DNF					
Nicole Begue	Women's super-G	—N/a				1:28.68	22
Nicole Begue; Francesca Baruzzi Farriol	Women's team combined	1:44.15	24	45.03	11	2:29.18	17

== Cross-country skiing ==
Argentina qualified one female and one male cross-country skier through the basic quota. Following the completion of the 2024–25 FIS Cross-Country World Cup, Argentina qualified a further one female and one male athlete.

Distance

Athlete	Event	Classical		Freestyle		Final		
Athlete	Event	Time	Rank	Time	Rank	Time	Deficit	Rank
Franco Dal Farra	Men's skiathlon	26:39.2	57	26:35.3	62	53:48.3	7:37.3	61
Franco Dal Farra	Men's 10 km freestyle	—N/a		23:26.0	58	—N/a		
Franco Dal Farra	Men's 50 km classical	2:25:30.2	39	—N/a				
Mateo Sauma	Men's skiathlon	28:52.8	69	LAP				67
Mateo Sauma	Men's 10 km freestyle	—N/a		25:58.1	89	—N/a		
Nahiara Díaz	Women's 10 km freestyle	—N/a		29:24.1	90	—N/a		
Agustina Groetzner Rocco	Women's 10 km freestyle	—N/a		29:32.6	92	—N/a		

Sprint

Athlete	Event	Qualification		Quarterfinal		Semifinal		Final	
Athlete	Event	Time	Rank	Time	Rank	Time	Rank	Time	Rank
Franco Dal Farra	Men's sprint	3:32.07	62	Did not advance					
Mateo Sauma	Men's sprint	3:38.48	78	Did not advance					
Agustina Groetzner Rocco	Women's sprint	4:28.52	83	Did not advance					
Nahiara Díaz	Women's sprint	4:27.01	80	Did not advance					
Franco Dal Farra; Mateo Sauma	Men's team sprint	6:23.54	25	—N/a				Did not advance	
Nahiara Díaz; Agustina Groetzner Rocco	Women's team sprint	7:51.15	24	—N/a				Did not advance	

== Luge ==
Argentina qualified one female through the basic quota.

Athlete	Event	Run 1		Run 2		Run 3		Run 4		Total	
Athlete	Event	Time	Rank	Time	Rank	Time	Rank	Time	Rank	Time	Rank
Verónica María Ravenna	Women's singles	54.038	20	54.517	24	54.341	23	Did not advance		2:42.896	22

== See also ==
- Argentina at the 2026 Winter Paralympics
