= Argentina at the 2022 Winter Olympics =

- Flag of Argentina
- IOC code: ARG
- NOC: Argentine Olympic Committee
- Website: www.coarg.org.ar (in Spanish)

in Beijing, China February 4–20, 2022
- Competitors: 6 (2 men and 4 women) in 4 sports
- Flag bearers (opening): Francesca Baruzzi; Franco Dal Farra
- Flag bearer (closing): Maria Victoria Rodriguez
- Medals: Gold 0 Silver 0 Bronze 0 Total 0

Winter Olympics appearances (overview)
- 1928; 1932–1936; 1948; 1952; 1956; 1960; 1964; 1968; 1972; 1976; 1980; 1984; 1988; 1992; 1994; 1998; 2002; 2006; 2010; 2014; 2018; 2022; 2026

Argentina competed at the 2022 Winter Olympics in Beijing, China, from 4 to 20 February 2022.

The Argentinean team consisted of two men and four women competing in four sports. On January 25, 2022, alpine skier Francesca Baruzzi and cross-country skier Franco Dal Farra were named as the country's flagbearers during the opening ceremony. Meanwhile speed skater Maria Victoria Rodriguez was the flagbearer during the closing ceremony.

== Competitors ==
The following is the list of number of competitors who participated at the Games per sport/discipline.

Sport	Men	Women	Total
Alpine skiing	1	1	2
Cross-country skiing	1	1	2
Speed skating	0	1	1
Luge	0	1	1
Total	2	4	6

== Alpine skiing ==
By meeting the basic qualification standards Argentina qualified one male and one female alpine skier.

Athlete	Event	Run 1		Run 2		Total	
Athlete	Event	Time	Rank	Time	Rank	Time	Rank
Tomás Birkner de Miguel	Men's slalom	DNF		Did not advance			
Tomás Birkner de Miguel	Men's giant slalom	DNF		Did not advance			
Francesca Baruzzi	Women's giant slalom	1:02:43	34	1:01.57	30	2:04.00	29
Francesca Baruzzi	Women's slalom	DNF		Did not advance			
Francesca Baruzzi	Women's super-G	—N/a				1:16.65	29

== Cross-country skiing ==
By meeting the basic qualification standards Argentina qualified one male and one female cross-country skier.

Distance

Athlete	Event	Classical		Freestyle		Final		
Athlete	Event	Time	Rank	Time	Rank	Time	Deficit	Rank
Franco Dal Farra	Men's 15 km classical	—N/a				48:35.5	+10:40.7	86
Franco Dal Farra	Men's 30 km skiathlon	LAP						63
Nahiara Díaz	Women's 10 km classical	—N/a				40:30.8	+12:24.5	96

Sprint

Athlete	Event	Qualification		Quarterfinal		Semifinal		Final	
Athlete	Event	Time	Rank	Time	Rank	Time	Rank	Time	Rank
Franco Dal Farra	Men's	3:09.95	74	Did not advance					
Nahiara Díaz	Women's	4:05.46	83	Did not advance					

== Luge ==
Based on the results during the 2021–22 Luge World Cup season, Argentina qualified 1 sled in the women's singles.

Athlete	Event	Run 1		Run 2		Run 3		Run 4		Total	
Athlete	Event	Time	Rank	Time	Rank	Time	Rank	Time	Rank	Time	Rank
Veronica Maria Ravenna	Women's singles	59.811	24	59.780	22	59.719	25	Did not advance		2:59.310	24

== Speed skating ==
Argentina qualified one athlete in the women's 500 metres event through the 2021–22 ISU Speed Skating World Cup. This will mark the country's sport debut at the Winter Olympics.

Distance

Athlete	Event	Finals	
Athlete	Event	Time	Rank
Maria Victoria Rodriguez	Women's 500 m	39.70	30

Mass start

Athlete	Event	Semifinals			Finals		
Athlete	Event	Points	Time	Rank	Points	Time	Rank
Maria Victoria Rodriguez	Women's mass start	0	9 laps	14	Did not advance		28
