= Argentina at the 2006 Winter Olympics =

- IOC code: ARG
- NOC: Argentine Olympic Committee
- Website: www.coarg.org.ar (in Spanish)

in Turin
- Competitors: 9 (5 men, 4 women) in 5 sports
- Flag bearers: María Belén Simari Birkner (opening); Clyde Getty (closing)
- Medals: Gold 0 Silver 0 Bronze 0 Total 0

Winter Olympics appearances (overview)
- 1928; 1932–1936; 1948; 1952; 1956; 1960; 1964; 1968; 1972; 1976; 1980; 1984; 1988; 1992; 1994; 1998; 2002; 2006; 2010; 2014; 2018; 2022; 2026

Argentina competed at the 2006 Winter Olympics in Turin, Italy.

== Alpine skiing ==
Of the five-person alpine skiing contingent Argentina sent to Turin, three were members of the Simari Birkner family. These three accounted for all of Argentina's top-30 finishes, with the best performances coming from Cristian Javier in the giant slalom and the combined.

Athlete	Event	Final				
Athlete	Event	Run 1	Run 2	Run 3	Total	Rank
Facundo Aguirre	Men's giant slalom	did not finish				
Cristian Javier Simari Birkner	Men's giant slalom	1:22.37	1:20.19	n/a	2:42.56	23
Cristian Javier Simari Birkner	Men's slalom	did not finish				
Cristian Javier Simari Birkner	Men's combined	1:43.93	45.89	46.72	3:16.54	23
Macarena Simari Birkner	Women's super-G	did not finish				
Macarena Simari Birkner	Women's giant slalom	1:05.81	1:13.62	n/a	2:19.43	31
Macarena Simari Birkner	Women's slalom	45.90	51.17	n/a	1:37.07	31
Macarena Simari Birkner	Women's combined	40.99	45.95	1:35.72	3:02.66	26
María Belén Simari Birkner	Women's super-G	n/a			1:38.02	47
María Belén Simari Birkner	Women's giant slalom	did not finish				
María Belén Simari Birkner	Women's slalom	46.35	51.26	n/a	1:37.61	37
María Belén Simari Birkner	Women's combined	41.55	47.08	1:36.72	3:05.35	29
Miriam Vazquez	Women's downhill	n/a			2:07.42	39
Miriam Vazquez	Women's combined	did not start				

Note: In the men's combined, runs 1 is the downhill, and runs 2 and 3 are the slalom. In the women's combined, run 1 and 2 are the slalom, and run 3 the downhill.

== Biathlon ==
Beltrame's best finish came in the individual event, where he finished 84th ahead of three other finishers.

Athlete	Event	Final		
Athlete	Event	Time	Misses	Rank
Sebastian Beltrame	Men's sprint	33:32.4	5	87
Sebastian Beltrame	Men's individual	1:09:24.3	9	84

== Cross-country skiing ==
Distance

Athlete	Event	Final	
Athlete	Event	Total	Rank
Martin Bianchi	Men's 15 km classical	49:08.0	86

== Freestyle skiing ==
44-year-old Colorado resident Clyde Getty represented Argentina in the men's aerials, finishing last in the field after failing to land his second jump.

Athlete	Event	Qualifying		Final	
Athlete	Event	Points	Rank	Points	Rank
Clyde Getty	Men's aerials	79.88	28	did not advance	

== Luge ==
Michelle Despain bumped into the track walls several times during the competition, and was nearly 10 seconds slower than the next-to-last finisher, but she did manage to complete all four runs.

Athlete	Event	Final					
Athlete	Event	Run 1	Run 2	Run 3	Run 4	Total	Rank
Michelle Despain	Women's singles	50.062	54.061	50.120	52.898	3:27.141	24
