= Argentina at the 2002 Winter Olympics =

- IOC code: ARG
- NOC: Argentine Olympic Committee
- Website: www.coarg.org.ar (in Spanish)

in Salt Lake City
- Competitors: 11 (8 men, 3 women) in 5 sports
- Flag bearer: Cristian Simari Birkner (alpine skiing)
- Medals: Gold 0 Silver 0 Bronze 0 Total 0

Winter Olympics appearances (overview)
- 1928; 1932–1936; 1948; 1952; 1956; 1960; 1964; 1968; 1972; 1976; 1980; 1984; 1988; 1992; 1994; 1998; 2002; 2006; 2010; 2014; 2018; 2022; 2026

Argentina competed at the 2002 Winter Olympics in Salt Lake City, United States.

== Alpine skiing ==
Men

Athlete	Event	Race 1	Race 2	Total	
Athlete	Event	Time	Time	Time	Rank
Cristian Simari Birkner	Downhill			DSQ	–
Nicolás Arsel	Downhill			1:49.75	52
Agustín García	Super-G			1:30.59	32
Nicolás Arsel	Super-G			1:28.55	30
Cristian Simari Birkner	Giant Slalom	1:16.00	1:13.79	2:29.79	30
Cristian Simari Birkner	Slalom	51.55	55.27	1:46.82	17

Men's combined

Athlete	Downhill	Slalom		Total	
Athlete	Time	Time 1	Time 2	Total time	Rank
Cristian Simari Birkner	DSQ	–	–	DSQ	–
Agustín García	1:49.77	DNF	–	DNF	–
Nicolás Arsel	1:48.12	51.24	57.22	3:36.58	23

Women

Athlete	Event	Race 1	Race 2	Total	
Athlete	Event	Time	Time	Time	Rank
María Belén Simari Birkner	Downhill			1:46.97	53
Macarena Simari Birkner	Downhill			1:46.77	34
Macarena Simari Birkner	Super-G			1:20.24	31
Macarena Simari Birkner	Giant Slalom	1:21.87	1:19.68	2:41.55	39
María Belén Simari Birkner	Giant Slalom	1:20.65	1:18.69	2:39.34	34
Macarena Simari Birkner	Slalom	DNF	–	DNF	–
María Belén Simari Birkner	Slalom	59.59	1:00.99	2:00.58	31

Women's combined

Athlete	Downhill	Slalom		Total	
Athlete	Time	Time 1	Time 2	Total time	Rank
María Belén Simari Birkner	1:19.94	49.29	46.69	2:55.92	20
Macarena Simari Birkner	1:19.21	48.14	45.55	2:52.90	17

== Biathlon ==
Men

Event	Athlete	Misses ^{1}	Time	Rank
10 km sprint	Ricardo Oscare	3	30:00.2	81

Event	Athlete	Time	Misses	Adjusted time ^{3}	Rank
20 km	Ricardo Oscare	56:08.1	6	1'02:08.1	80

Women

Event	Athlete	Misses ^{1}	Time	Rank
7.5 km sprint	Natalia Lovece	8	29:33.2	73

Event	Athlete	Time	Misses	Adjusted time ^{3}	Rank
15 km	Natalia Lovece	57:56.8	12	1'09:56.8	69

^{1} A penalty loop of 150 metres had to be skied per missed target.
^{3} One minute added per missed target.

== Freestyle skiing ==
Men

Athlete	Event	Qualification		Final	
Athlete	Event	Points	Rank	Points	Rank
Clyde Getty	Aerials	117.02	25	did not advance	

== Luge ==
Men

Athlete	Run 1		Run 2		Run 3		Run 4		Total	
Athlete	Time	Rank	Time	Rank	Time	Rank	Time	Rank	Time	Rank
Rubén González	48.180	46	46.931	38	48.533	45	48.276	42	3:12.808	41
Marcelo González	47.314	44	47.819	44	46.883	41	53.431	47	3:14.559	43

== Skeleton ==
Men

Athlete	Run 1		Run 2		Total	
Athlete	Time	Rank	Time	Rank	Time	Rank
German Glessner	55.40	26	57.25	26	1:52.65	26
