= De Ridder =

De Ridder is a Dutch surname, meaning "the knight". It may refer to:

== People ==
- Alexandra Simons de Ridder (born 1963), German equestrian
- Alfons de Ridder (1882–1960), Flemish writer and poet
- Allard de Ridder (1887–1966), Dutch and Canadian conductor, violist, and composer
- André de Ridder (born 1971), German music conductor
- Chantal de Ridder (born 1989), Dutch footballer
- Daniël de Ridder (born 1984), Dutch footballer
- Daniela De Ridder (born 1962), German politician
- Dirk de Ridder (sailor) (born 1972), Dutch competitive sailor
- Gaspard Deridder (1918–1977), Belgian boxer
- Hilde De Ridder-Symoens (1943–2023), Dutch historian
- Johan de Ridder (1927–2013), South African architect
- Louis De Ridder (1902–1981), Belgian winter sports athlete
- Luis de Ridder (1928–2004), Argentine alpine skier
- Marcello de Ridder (1922–1973), Argentine bobsledder
- Minneke De Ridder (born 1980), Belgian politician
- Paul De Ridder (born 1948), Belgian historian and politician
- Peter de Ridder (born 1946), Dutch businessman and sailor
- Philippe De Ridder (born 1964), Belgian football player, coach, and administrator
- Reinier De Ridder (born 1990), Dutch mixed martial artist
- Steve De Ridder (born 1987), Belgian footballer
- Willem de Ridder (1939–2022), Dutch artist and anarchist
- Jäger de Ridder (born 2007),

Aspiring mixed martial artist

== Other ==
- DeRidder, Louisiana, a place named for Ella de Ridder, the sister-in-law of a Dutch railroad financier
