= Argentina at the 2014 Winter Olympics =

- IOC code: ARG
- NOC: Argentine Olympic Committee
- Website: www.coarg.org.ar (in Spanish)

in Sochi
- Competitors: 7 in 2 sports
- Flag bearers: Cristian Javier Simari Birkner (opening); Sebastiano Gastaldi (closing)
- Medals: Gold 0 Silver 0 Bronze 0 Total 0

Winter Olympics appearances (overview)
- 1928; 1932–1936; 1948; 1952; 1956; 1960; 1964; 1968; 1972; 1976; 1980; 1984; 1988; 1992; 1994; 1998; 2002; 2006; 2010; 2014; 2018; 2022; 2026

Argentina competed at the 2014 Winter Olympics in Sochi, Russia, from 7 to 23 February 2014. A team of seven athletes in two sports competed for the country. Cristian Javier Simari Birkner, an alpine skier, was the flagbearer for the second consecutive games. It also marks the third consecutive games a member of the Simari Birkner family has carried the flag for Argentina.

The 2014 Winter Olympics marked the first time that Argentinean athletes competed in Russia as Argentina and 63 other western nations participated at the American-led boycott of the 1980 Summer Olympics in Moscow because of the Soviet-Afghan war.

== Competitors ==
Sport	Men	Women	Total
Alpine skiing	3	3	6
Cross-country skiing	1	0	1
Total	4	3	7

== Alpine skiing ==
According to the final quota allocation released on 20 January 2014, Argentina had six athletes in qualification position. The non-selection of three-time Olympian María Belén Simari Birkner led to her brother Cristian, who made the team, to lead a petition to have her as a part of the team. They claimed the selection of athletes made no sense and was purely subjective. The appeal was ultimately unsuccessful.

Athlete	Event	Run 1		Run 2		Total	
Athlete	Event	Time	Rank	Time	Rank	Time	Rank
Sebastiano Gastaldi	Men's giant slalom	DNF					
Sebastiano Gastaldi	Men's slalom	53.24	46	DNF			
Jorge Birkner Ketelhohn	Men's combined	2:01.05	46	DNF			
Jorge Birkner Ketelhohn	Men's giant slalom	DNF					
Jorge Birkner Ketelhohn	Men's slalom	DNF					
Jorge Birkner Ketelhohn	Men's super-G	—N/a				1:23.89	50
Cristian Simari Birkner	Men's combined	1:59.63	43	56.46	27	2:56.09	29
Cristian Simari Birkner	Men's downhill	—N/a				DNS	
Cristian Simari Birkner	Men's giant slalom	1:26.02	40	1:27.89	40	2:53.91	40
Cristian Simari Birkner	Men's slalom	DNF					
Cristian Simari Birkner	Men's super-G	—N/a				1:23.36	48
Salomé Báncora	Women's giant slalom	1:25.88	50	1:26.16	47	2:52.04	47
Salomé Báncora	Women's slalom	59.26	=31	56.26	26	1:55.52	25
Julietta Quiroga	Women's giant slalom	DNF					
Julietta Quiroga	Women's slalom	DNF					
Macarena Simari Birkner	Women's combined	1:48.87	31	55.06	18	2:43.93	20
Macarena Simari Birkner	Women's downhill	—N/a				1:46.44	32
Macarena Simari Birkner	Women's giant slalom	1:24.74	44	1:23.11	37	2:47.85	39
Macarena Simari Birkner	Women's slalom	59.82	36	56.69	29	1:56.51	27
Macarena Simari Birkner	Women's super-G	—N/a				1:31.10	26

== Cross-country skiing ==
According to the quota allocation released on 20 January 2014, Argentina had one athlete in qualification position.

Distance

Athlete	Event	Final		
Athlete	Event	Time	Deficit	Rank
Federico Cichero	Men's 15 km classical	49:11.3	+10:41.6	83

== See also ==
- Argentina at the 2014 Summer Youth Olympics
- Argentina at the 2014 Winter Paralympics
