= Argentina at the 2018 Winter Olympics =

- Flag of Argentina
- IOC code: ARG
- NOC: Argentine Olympic Committee
- Website: www.coarg.org.ar (in Spanish)

in Pyeongchang, South Korea 9–25 February 2018
- Competitors: 7 in 4 sports
- Flag bearer (opening): Sebastiano Gastaldi (opening)
- Flag bearer (closing): Verónica Ravenna (luge)
- Medals: Gold 0 Silver 0 Bronze 0 Total 0

Winter Olympics appearances (overview)
- 1928; 1932–1936; 1948; 1952; 1956; 1960; 1964; 1968; 1972; 1976; 1980; 1984; 1988; 1992; 1994; 1998; 2002; 2006; 2010; 2014; 2018; 2022; 2026

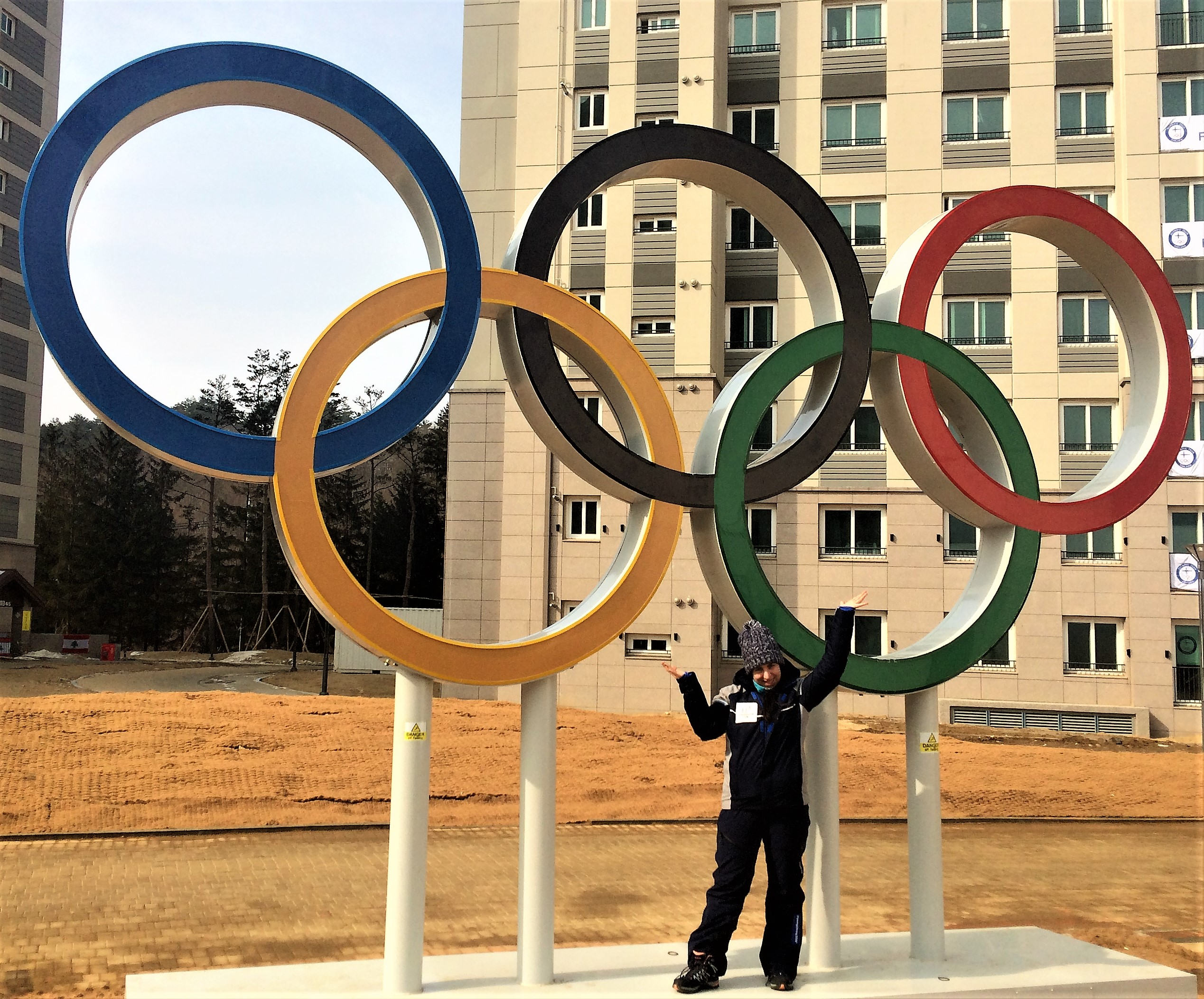

Argentina competed at the 2018 Winter Olympics in Pyeongchang, South Korea, from 9 to 25 February 2018, with seven competitors in four sports.

== Competitors ==
The following is the list of number of competitors participating in the Argentine delegation per sport.

Sport	Men	Women	Total
Alpine skiing	1	1	2
Cross-country skiing	1	1	2
Snowboarding	2	0	2
Luge	0	1	1
Total	4	3	7

== Alpine skiing ==
Argentina qualified two athletes, one male and one female.

Athlete	Event	Run 1		Run 2		Total	
Athlete	Event	Time	Rank	Time	Rank	Time	Rank
Sebastiano Gastaldi	Men's giant slalom	DNF					
Nicol Gastaldi	Women's giant slalom	1:18.06	44	1:15.38	43	2:33.44	42
Nicol Gastaldi	Women's slalom	DNF					

== Cross-country skiing ==
Argentina qualified two athletes, one male and one female.

Distance

Athlete	Event	Final		
Athlete	Event	Time	Deficit	Rank
Matías Zuloaga	Men's 15 km freestyle	42:27.5	+8:43.6	100
María Cecilia Domínguez	Women's 10 km freestyle	34:16.1	9:15.6	87

== Luge ==
Argentina qualified one sled.

Athlete	Event	Run 1		Run 2		Run 3		Run 4		Total	
Athlete	Event	Time	Rank	Time	Rank	Time	Rank	Time	Rank	Time	Rank
Verónica María Ravenna	Women's singles	47.175	22	47.788	26	47.739	24	Eliminated		2:22.702	24

== Snowboarding ==
Argentina received reallocation spots in the men's big air, slopestyle and snowboard cross events.

Freestyle

Athlete	Event	Qualification				Final				
Athlete	Event	Run 1	Run 2	Best	Rank	Run 1	Run 2	Run 3	Best	Rank
Matías Schmitt	Men's big air	51.75	23.00	51.75	15	Did not advance				
Matías Schmitt	Men's slopestyle	50.86	20.68	50.86	12	Did not advance				

Snowboard cross

Athlete	Event	Seeding						1/8 final	Quarterfinal	Semifinal	Final	
Athlete	Event	Run 1		Run 2		Best	Seed	1/8 final	Quarterfinal	Semifinal	Final	
Athlete	Event	Time	Rank	Time	Rank	Best	Seed	Position	Position	Position	Position	Rank
Steven Williams	Men's snowboard cross	1:17.12	34	1:15.35	5	1:15.35	29	4	Did not advance			

== See also ==
- Argentina at the 2018 Summer Youth Olympics
