= Rocío Sánchez Moccia =

Argentine field hockey player (born 1988)

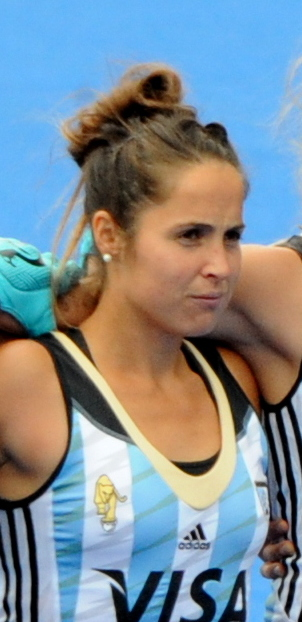
- Moccia in 2016

Personal information
- Born: 2 August 1988 (age 37) Buenos Aires, Argentina
- Height: 1.57 m (5 ft 2 in)
- Weight: 54 kg (119 lb)

Sport
- Sport: Field hockey
- Position: Midfielder
Senior career
| Years | Team | Caps | Goals |
| –2016 | Liceo Naval | - | - |
| 2016–2018 | Club de Campo | - | - |
| 2018–2019 | Mannheimer HC | - | - |
National team
| Years | Team | Caps | Goals |
| 2008–2009 | Argentina U21 | | - |
| 2007– | Argentina | 247 | (17) |
Medal record
Summer Olympics
| Silver medal – second place | 2012 London | Team |
| Silver medal – second place | 2020 Tokyo | Team |
| Bronze medal – third place | 2024 Paris | Team |
World Cup
| Silver medal – second place | 2022 Terrassa/Amstelveen |
| Bronze medal – third place | 2014 The Hague |
World League
| Gold medal – first place | 2014-15 Rosario |
Champions Trophy
| Gold medal – first place | 2012 Rosario |
| Gold medal – first place | 2014 Mendoza |
| Gold medal – first place | 2016 London |
| Silver medal – second place | 2011 Amstelveen |
| Bronze medal – third place | 2018 Changzhou |
Pan American Games
| Gold medal – first place | 2023 Santiago | Team |
| Silver medal – second place | 2011 Guadalajara | Team |
| Silver medal – second place | 2015 Toronto | Team |
Pan American Cup
| Gold medal – first place | 2009 Hamilton |
| Gold medal – first place | 2013 Mendoza |
| Gold medal – first place | 2017 Lancaster |
| Gold medal – first place | 2022 Santiago |
Junior World Cup
| Silver medal – second place | 2009 Boston |

Rocío Sánchez Moccia (born 2 August 1988) is an Argentine field hockey player. She competed for the Argentina national team, winning two silver medals at the 2012 and 2020 Summer Olympics and a bronze at the 2024 Summer Olympics.

On 3 July 2024, the Argentine Olympic Committee appointed Sánchez Moccia and the volleyball player Luciano De Cecco as the flag bearers at the 2024 Summer Olympics opening ceremony.

== Career ==
Sánchez Moccia has won three Champions Trophies, the World League 2014–15, the bronze medal at the 2014 World Cup in The Hague, Netherlands and four Pan American Cups.

In 2022, she won the 2021-22 Hockey Pro League and a silver medal at the 2022 World Cup.

In 2023, she won a gold medal at 2023 Pan American Games. She also won a bronze medal with Las Leonas at the 2024 Summer Olympics.

Olympic Games
| Preceded by Francesca Baruzzi; Franco Dal Farra | Flagbearer for Argentina; París 2024; With: Luciano De Cecco | Succeeded by Incumbent |
