= Ana María Dellai =

Argentine alpine skier (1929–1986)

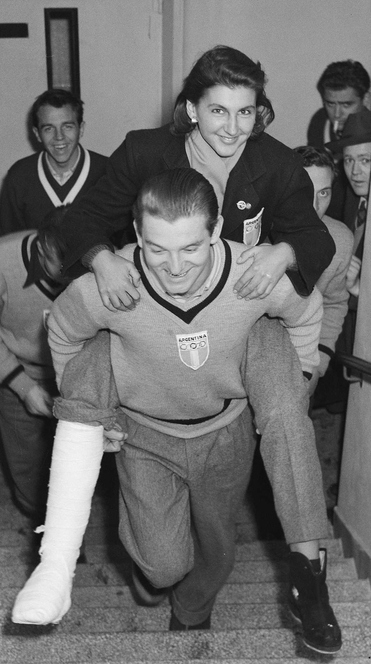
- Ana María Dellai at the 1952 Olympics

Personal information
- Born: 16 October 1929 Castelrotto, Italy
- Died: 15 February 1986 (aged 56) San Carlos de Bariloche, Argentina

Sport
- Sport: Alpine skiing
- Club: Club Andino Bariloche

Ana María Dellai (16 October 1929 – 15 February 1986) was an Argentine alpine skier.

== Biography ==
Dellai is a former member of Club Andino Bariloche. She competed at the 1952 Winter Olympics hosted in Oslo, Norway, in the downhill, slalom and giant slalom events and placed 28th–31st. She was the only female competitor from the Argentine Delegation at those Olympics, as well the first woman to represent Argentina at the Winter Olympics. She was the Flag bearer of the delegation during the opening ceremony.

In 1954, she was part of the cast of the movie Canción de la nieve.
