= Argentina at the 1968 Winter Olympics =

- IOC code: ARG
- NOC: Argentine Olympic Committee
- Website: www.coarg.org.ar (in Spanish)

in Grenoble
- Competitors: 5 (2 men, 3 women) in 1 sport
- Medals: Gold 0 Silver 0 Bronze 0 Total 0

Winter Olympics appearances (overview)
- 1928; 1932–1936; 1948; 1952; 1956; 1960; 1964; 1968; 1972; 1976; 1980; 1984; 1988; 1992; 1994; 1998; 2002; 2006; 2010; 2014; 2018; 2022; 2026

Argentina competed at the 1968 Winter Olympics in Grenoble, France.

== Alpine skiing ==
Men

Athlete	Event	Race 1		Race 2		Total	
Athlete	Event	Time	Rank	Time	Rank	Time	Rank
Roberto Thostrup	Downhill					2:17.35	57
Gustavo Ezquerra	Downhill					2:17.11	55
Gustavo Ezquerra	Giant Slalom	1:59.60	65	2:00.51	64	4:00.11	63
Roberto Thostrup	Giant Slalom	1:58.92	63	1:58.70	58	3:57.62	61

Men's slalom

Athlete	Heat 1		Heat 2		Final					
Athlete	Time	Rank	Time	Rank	Time 1	Rank	Time 2	Rank	Total	Rank
Roberto Thostrup	DSQ	–	1:00.80	4	did not advance					
Gustavo Ezquerra	57.09	3	59.96	3	did not advance					

Women

Athlete	Event	Race 1		Race 2		Total	
Athlete	Event	Time	Rank	Time	Rank	Time	Rank
Ana Sabine Naumann	Giant Slalom					DNF	–
Helga María Sista	Giant Slalom					2:11.75	38
Irene Viaene	Giant Slalom					2:11.68	37
Irene Viaene	Slalom	DSQ	–	–	–	DSQ	–
Ana Sabine Naumann	Slalom	53.13	33	57.04	27	1:50.17	29
Helga María Sista	Slalom	51.98	31	57.18	28	1:49.16	27
