= Argentina at the 1998 Winter Olympics =

- IOC code: ARG
- NOC: Argentine Olympic Committee
- Website: www.coarg.org.ar (in Spanish)

in Nagano
- Competitors: 2 (1 man, 1 woman) in 2 sports
- Flag bearer: Carola Calello (alpine skiing)
- Medals: Gold 0 Silver 0 Bronze 0 Total 0

Winter Olympics appearances (overview)
- 1928; 1932–1936; 1948; 1952; 1956; 1960; 1964; 1968; 1972; 1976; 1980; 1984; 1988; 1992; 1994; 1998; 2002; 2006; 2010; 2014; 2018; 2022; 2026

Argentina was represented at the 1998 Winter Olympics in Nagano, Japan by the Argentine Olympic Committee.

In total, two athletes including one man and one woman represented Argentina in two different sports including alpine skiing and snowboarding.

== Competitors ==
In total, two athletes represented Argentina at the 1998 Winter Olympics in Nagano, Japan across two different sports.

Sport	Men	Women	Total
Alpine skiing	0	1	1
Snowboarding	1	0	1
Total	1	1	2

== Alpine skiing ==
In total, one Argentinian athlete participated in the alpine skiing events – Carola Calello in the women's downhill, the women's super-G, the women's giant slalom, the women's slalom and the women's combined.

The women's super-G was due to take place on 10 February 1998 but was postponed due to heavy snow and instead took place on 11 February 1998. Calello completed the course in a time of one minute 25.08 seconds to finish 41st overall.

The women's downhill was due to take place on 14 February 1998 but was postponed twice due to the weather and instead took place on 16 February 1998. Calello completed the course in a time of one minute 36.71 seconds to finish 34th overall.

The women's slalom took place on 19 February 1998. Calello completed her first run in a time of 50.52 seconds. She completed her second run in a time of one minute 51.04 seconds for a total time of one minute 41.56 seconds to finish 25th overall.

The women's giant slalom took place on 20 February 1998. Calello did not finish her first run and did not take part in the second run.

Athlete	Event	Race 1	Race 2	Total	
Athlete	Event	Time	Time	Time	Rank
Carola Calello	Downhill			1:36.71	34
Carola Calello	Super-G			1:25.08	41
Carola Calello	Giant slalom	DNF	–	DNF	–
Carola Calello	Slalom	50.52	51.04	1:41.56	25

The women's combined took place on 16 and 17 February 1998. Calello completed her downhill run in a time of one minute 35.09 seconds and her first slalom run in a time of 39.98 seconds. She completed her second slalom run in a time of 38.70 seconds for a total time of two minutes 53.77 seconds to finish 19th overall.

Athlete	Event	Downhill	Slalom		Total	
Athlete	Event	Time	Time 1	Time 2	Total time	Rank
Carola Calello	Combined	1:35.09	39.98	38.70	2:53.77	19

== Snowboarding ==
In total, one Argentinian athlete participated in the snowboarding events – Mariano López in the men's giant slalom.

The men's giant slalom took place on 8 February 1998. López completed his first run in a time of one minute 12.20 seconds. He completed his second run in a time of one minute 19.11 seconds for a total time of two minutes 31.31 seconds to finish 21st overall.

Athlete	Race 1	Race 2	Total	
Athlete	Time	Time	Time	Rank
Mariano López	1:12.20	1:19.11	2:31.31	21
