= Argentina at the 1960 Winter Olympics =

- IOC code: ARG
- NOC: Argentine Olympic Committee
- Website: www.coarg.org.ar (in Spanish)

in Squaw Valley
- Competitors: 6 (5 men, 1 woman) in 2 sports
- Medals: Gold 0 Silver 0 Bronze 0 Total 0

Winter Olympics appearances (overview)
- 1928; 1932–1936; 1948; 1952; 1956; 1960; 1964; 1968; 1972; 1976; 1980; 1984; 1988; 1992; 1994; 1998; 2002; 2006; 2010; 2014; 2018; 2022; 2026

Argentina competed at the 1960 Winter Olympics in Squaw Valley, United States. The nation returned to the Winter Games after missing the 1956 Winter Olympics. Argentina got to lead the Parade of Nations in Greece's absence.

== Alpine skiing ==
Men

Athlete	Event	Race 1		Race 2		Total	
Athlete	Event	Time	Rank	Time	Rank	Time	Rank
Clemente Tellechea	Downhill					3:20.2	60
Osvaldo Ancinas	Downhill					2:28.4	45
Clemente Tellechea	Giant Slalom					DSQ	–
Diego Schweizer	Giant Slalom					2:28.0	55
Osvaldo Ancinas	Giant Slalom					2:05.1	32
Jorge Abelardo Eiras	Slalom	n/a	n/a	DSQ	–	DSQ	–
Diego Schweizer	Slalom	1:32.2	48	1:34.6	37	3:06.8	38
Clemente Tellechea	Slalom	1:28.7	45	1:26.0	32	2:54.7	32
Osvaldo Ancinas	Slalom	1:17.5	23	1:06.7	16	2:24.2	16

Women

Athlete	Event	Race 1		Race 2		Total	
Athlete	Event	Time	Rank	Time	Rank	Time	Rank
María Cristina Schweizer	Downhill					1:51.0	29
María Cristina Schweizer	Giant Slalom					1:55.2	35
María Cristina Schweizer	Slalom	1:05.9	31	1:06.0	28	2:11.9	25

== Cross-country skiing ==
Men

Event	Athlete	Race	
Event	Athlete	Time	Rank
15 km	Francisco Jerman	1'09:59.3	53
30 km	Francisco Jerman	2'33:27.4	44
