= Argentina at the 2010 Winter Olympics =

- IOC code: ARG
- NOC: Argentine Olympic Committee
- Website: www.coarg.org.ar (in Spanish)

in Vancouver
- Competitors: 7 in 3 sports
- Flag bearer: Cristian Javier Simari Birkner
- Medals: Gold 0 Silver 0 Bronze 0 Total 0

Winter Olympics appearances (overview)
- 1928; 1932–1936; 1948; 1952; 1956; 1960; 1964; 1968; 1972; 1976; 1980; 1984; 1988; 1992; 1994; 1998; 2002; 2006; 2010; 2014; 2018; 2022; 2026

Argentina competed at the 2010 Winter Olympics in Vancouver, British Columbia, Canada.

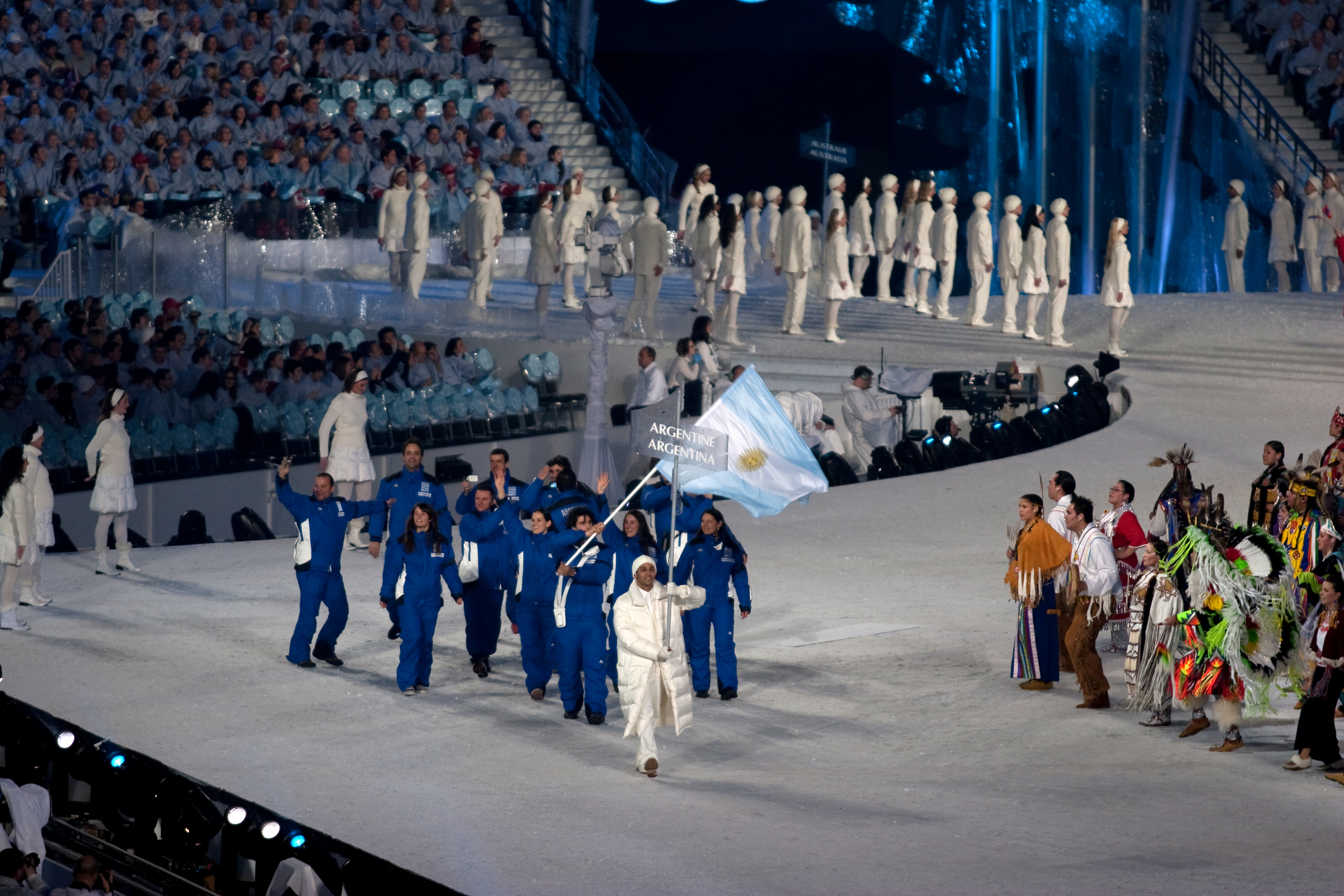
The athletes entering the stadium during the opening ceremonies.

== Alpine skiing ==
Argentina has qualified five entrants in alpine skiing.

Men

Athlete	Event	Run 1	Run 2	Total	Rank
Cristian Javier Simari Birkner	Men's downhill			2:01.67	55
Cristian Javier Simari Birkner	Men's combined	Downhill; 2:00.58	Slalom; DNF	did not finish	
Cristian Javier Simari Birkner	Men's super-G			did not start	
Cristian Javier Simari Birkner	Men's slalom	51.35	53.37	1:44.72	26
Cristian Javier Simari Birkner	Men's giant slalom	1:20.87	1:23.76	2:44.63	34
Agustin Torres	Men's slalom	DNF	did not advance		
Agustin Torres	Men's giant slalom	1:25.14	1:28.12	2:53.26	54

Women

Athlete	Event	Run 1	Run 2	Total	Rank
Macarena Simari Birkner	Women's downhill			1:54.25	31
Macarena Simari Birkner	Women's combined	Downhill; 1:29.56	Slalom; 46.81	2:16.37	26
Macarena Simari Birkner	Women's super-G			1:27.48	32
Macarena Simari Birkner	Women's slalom	56.84	55.51	1:52.35	36
Macarena Simari Birkner	Women's giant slalom	1:23.29	1:18.73	2:42.02	45
María Belén Simari Birkner	Women's downhill			1:53.62	29
María Belén Simari Birkner	Women's combined	Downhill; 1:30.19	Slalom; DNF	did not finish	
María Belén Simari Birkner	Women's super-G			1:27.24	31
María Belén Simari Birkner	Women's slalom	58.99	DNF		
María Belén Simari Birkner	Women's giant slalom	1:23.60	1:18.78	2:42.38	46
Nicol Gastaldi	Women's slalom	DNF	did not advance		
Nicol Gastaldi	Women's giant slalom	1:24.25	1:19.53	2:43.78	48

== Cross-country skiing ==
Argentina has qualified one entrant in cross-country skiing.

Athlete	Event	Final	
Athlete	Event	Time	Rank
Carlos Lannes	Men's 15 km freestyle	41:34.9	82

== Luge ==
Argentina has qualified one entrant in luge.

Athlete	Event	Final					
Athlete	Event	Run 1	Run 2	Run 3	Run 4	Total	Rank
Ruben Gonzalez	Men's singles	52.540	52.155	52.298	51.312	3:28.305	38

== See also ==
- Argentina at the Olympics
- Argentina at the 2010 Winter Paralympics
