= Francesca Baruzzi Farriol =

Argentine alpine skier (born 1998)

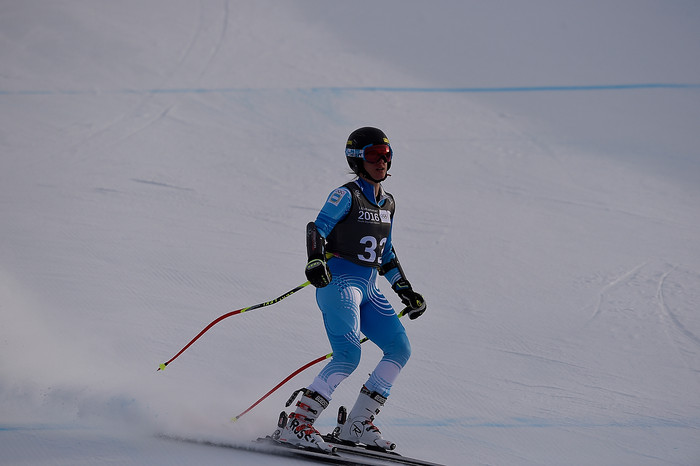
- Baruzzi Farriol at the 2016 Winter Youth Olympics

Personal information
- Born: 22 July 1998 (age 28) San Carlos de Bariloche, Argentina

Skiing career
- Country: Argentina
- Sport: Alpine skiing ♀
- Disciplines: Super-G, giant slalom, slalom
- World Cup debut: 8 January 2019 (age 20)

Olympics
- Teams: 2 – (2022, 2026)
- Medals: 0

World Championships
- Teams: 4 – (2017-2021, 2025)
- Medals: 0

World Cup
- Seasons: 6 – (2019, 2022–2026)
- Podiums: 0
- Overall titles: 0 – (119th in 2025)
- Discipline titles: 0 – (53rd in GS, 2025)

Francesca Baruzzi Farriol (born 22 July 1998) is an Argentine World Cup alpine ski racer. She competed for Argentina at the 2022 and 2026 Winter Olympics.

Baruzzi Farriol scored her first World Cup point on 4 January 2025, in the giant slalom in Kranjska Gora. It was her 18th start in a World Cup race, and the first time an Argentine skier scored alpine World Cup points outside a Combination event in at least 30 years.

== World Cup results ==
=== Results per discipline ===
Discipline	WC starts	WC top 30	WC top 15	WC top 5	WC podium	Best result		
Discipline	WC starts	WC top 30	WC top 15	WC top 5	WC podium	Date	Location	Place
Slalom	18	0	0	0	0	23 February 2025	Sestriere, Italy	38th
Giant slalom	20	1	0	0	0	4 January 2025	Kranjska Gora, Slovenia	30th
Super-G	2	0	0	0	0	5 December 2021	Lake Louise, Canada	44th
Downhill	0	0	0	0	0			
Combined	0	0	0	0	0			
Total	22	1	0	0	0			

- Standings through 31 January 2026

== World Championship results ==
Year
Year	Age	Slalom	Giant slalom	Super-G	Downhill	Combined	Team combined	Parallel	Team event
2017	18	DNFQ2	DNF2	—	—	—	—N/a	—N/a	9
2019	20	—	41	—	—	—	—N/a	—N/a	9
2021	22	DNF2	30	36	—	DNF2	—N/a	DNQ	—
2025	26	DNF1	DNF2	—	—	—N/a	—	—N/a	9

== Olympic results ==
Year
Year	Age	Slalom	Giant slalom	Super-G	Downhill	Combined	Team combined	Team event
2022	23	DNF1	29	29	—	—	—N/a	—
2026	27	DNF1	29	DNF	—	—N/a	17	—N/a

Olympic Games
Preceded by Cecilia Carranza; Santiago Lange	Flagbearer for Argentina; Beijing 2022 with Franco Dal Farra	Succeeded by Luciano De Cecco; Rocío Sánchez Moccia
