= Agustin Torres =

Argentine alpine skier (born 1978)

Agustin Torres (born 17 August 1978) is an alpine skier from Argentina. He competed for Argentina at the 2010 Winter Olympics. His best result was a 54th place in the giant slalom.
