= Argentina at the 1994 Winter Olympics =

- IOC code: ARG
- NOC: Argentine Olympic Committee
- Website: www.coarg.org.ar (in Spanish)

in Lillehammer
- Competitors: 10 in 2 sports
- Flag bearer: María Giro
- Medals: Gold 0 Silver 0 Bronze 0 Total 0

Winter Olympics appearances (overview)
- 1928; 1932–1936; 1948; 1952; 1956; 1960; 1964; 1968; 1972; 1976; 1980; 1984; 1988; 1992; 1994; 1998; 2002; 2006; 2010; 2014; 2018; 2022; 2026

Argentina competed at the 1994 Winter Olympics in Lillehammer, Norway.

== Competitors ==
The following is the list of number of competitors in the Games.

| Sport | Men | Women | Total |
|---|---|---|---|
| Alpine skiing | 4 | 5 | 9 |
| Biathlon | 0 | 1 | 1 |
| Total | 4 | 6 | 10 |

== Alpine skiing ==
Men

| Athlete | Event | Final | | | | |
| Athlete | Event | Run 1 | Run 2 | Run 3 | Total | Rank |
|---|---|---|---|---|---|---|
| Gáston Begue | Super-G | | | | 1:41.21 | 48 |
| Carlos Manuel Bustos | Super-G | | | | DNF | |
| Maríano Puricelli | Downhill | | | | 1:52.38 | 45 |
| Maríano Puricelli | Combined | 1:43.13 | DNF | | DNF | |
| Federico van Ditmar | Super-G | | | | DNF | |
| Federico van Ditmar | Giant Slalom | DNF | | | DNF | |
| Federico van Ditmar | Slalom | DNF | | | DNF | |

Women

| Athlete | Event | Final | | | | |
| Athlete | Event | Run 1 | Run 2 | Run 3 | Total | Rank |
|---|---|---|---|---|---|---|
| Carola Calello | Super-G | | | | 1:35.87 | 45 |
| Dominique Ezquerra | Super-G | | | | 1:32.71 | 43 |
| Gabriela Quijano | Downhill | | | | 1:49.26 | 43 |
| Gabriela Quijano | Super-G | | | | 1:33.45 | 44 |
| Gabriela Quijano | Slalom | 1:09.70 | 1:07.56 | | 2:17.26 | 26 |
| Gabriela Quijano | Combined | 1:39.88 | 57.87 | 55.76 | 3:33.51 | 22 |
| Francisca Steverlynck | Downhill | | | | 1:46.76 | 41 |
| Francisca Steverlynck | Super-G | | | | 1:32.56 | 42 |
| Francisca Steverlynck | Combined | 1:37.10 | 58.98 | 56.56 | 3:32.64 | 21 |
| Jennifer Taylor | Downhill | | | | 1:49.53 | 44 |
| Jennifer Taylor | Combined | 1:39.18 | 1:06.47 | 58.62 | 3:44.27 | 25 |

== Biathlon ==
Women

| Athlete | Event | Final | | |
| Athlete | Event | Time | Pen. | Rank |
|---|---|---|---|---|
| María Giro | 7.5 km sprint | 29:31.9 | 1 | 54 |
| María Giro | 15 km individual | 1:02:24.2 | 5 | 66 |
