= Nicol Gastaldi =

Argentine alpine skier (born 1990)

Personal information
- Born: 16 February 1990 (age 35); Piove di Sacco, Italy

Sport
- Sport: Alpine skiing

Nicol Gastaldi (born 16 February 1990 in Piove di Sacco, Italy) is an alpine skier from Argentina. She competed for Argentina at the 2010 Winter Olympics. Her best result was a 48th place in the giant slalom. Gastaldi also competed for Argentina at the 2018 Winter Olympics.

Her brother is also a skier, Sebastiano Gastaldi.
