= Cecilia Carranza =

Argentine sailor

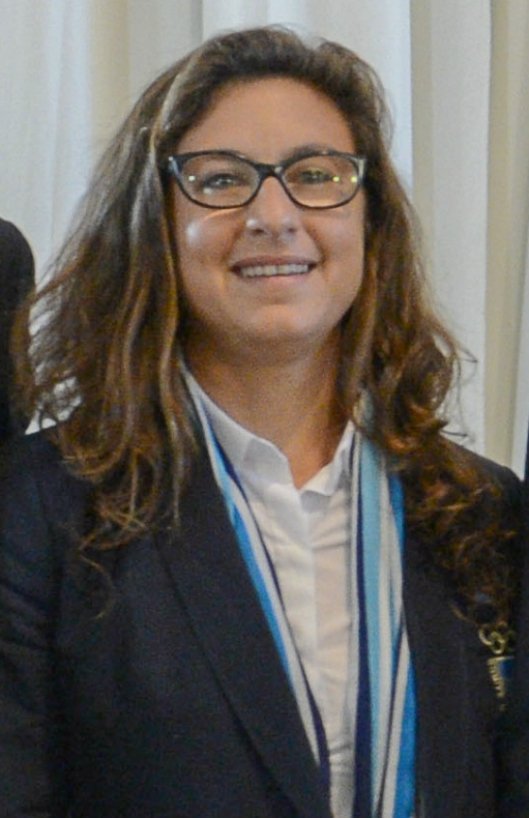
- Carranza in 2016

Personal information
- Full name: Cecilia Carranza Saroli
- Born: 29 December 1986 (age 39) Rosario, Argentina

Sailing career
- Sport: Sailing
Medal record
Sailing
Representing Argentina
Olympic Games
Gold medal – first place	2016 Rio de Janeiro	Nacra 17
World Championships
Silver medal – second place	2014 Santander	Nacra 17
Bronze medal – third place	2004 Manly	Laser Radial
Pan American Games
Gold medal – first place	2011 Guadalajara	Women's Laser Radial

Cecilia Carranza Saroli (Note: In this Spanish name, the first or paternal surname is Carranza and the second or maternal family name is Saroli.) (born 29 December 1986) is an Argentine Olympic sailor.

== Career ==
At the 2012 Summer Olympics, she competed in the Women's Laser Radial class, finishing in the 21st place. At the 2008 Summer Olympics she finished 8th in the same event. Cecilia won the gold medal at the 2011 Pan American Games. At the 2016 Summer Olympics, she won the gold medal in the category Nacra 17 alongside fellow sailor Santiago Lange.

She qualified to represent Argentina with Lange at the 2020 Summer Olympics. She and Lange were Argentina's flag bearers for the opening ceremony.

== Personal life ==
She was born in Rosario, Argentina. She is openly lesbian.

== Notes ==
Olympic Games
Preceded by Sebastiano Gastaldi	Flagbearer for Argentina; Tokyo 2020 with Santiago Lange	Succeeded by Francesca Baruzzi; Franco Dal Farra
