= 2012–13 CEV Challenge Cup =

- League: CEV Challenge Cup
- Sport: Volleyball
- Duration: 20 October 2012 – 24 March 2013

Finals
- Champions: (Italy) Copra Elior Piacenza
- Runners-up: (Russia) Ural Ufa
- Finals MVP: (Argentina) Luciano De Cecco (Copra Elior Piacenza)

CEV Challenge Cup seasons
- ← 2011–12 2013–14 →

The 2012–13 CEV Challenge Cup was the 33rd edition of the European Challenge Cup volleyball club tournament, the former CEV Cup.

The Italian club Copra Elior Piacenza beat the Russian club Ural Ufa in the final and achieved its first CEV Challenge Cup trophy. Argentinian setter Luciano De Cecco was named the Most Valuable Player of the final tournament.

== Final phase ==
=== Semi-finals ===
Team 1	Agg.	Team 2	1st leg	2nd leg	Golden Set
Copra Elior Piacenza (Italy)	2–0	(Czech Republic) Dukla Liberec	3–0	3–0	
Ural Ufa (Russia)	1–1	(Poland) Delecta Bydgoszcz	3–1	2–3	15–12

==== First leg ====
Date	Time		Score		Set 1	Set 2	Set 3	Set 4	Set 5	Total	Report
27 Feb	20:30	Copra Elior Piacenza (Italy)	3–0	(Czech Republic) Dukla Liberec	25–14	26–24	25–16			76–54	Report
27 Feb	19:00	Ural Ufa (Russia)	3–1	(Poland) Delecta Bydgoszcz	25–19	25–23	22–25	26–24		98–91	Report

==== Second leg ====
Date	Time		Score		Set 1	Set 2	Set 3	Set 4	Set 5	Total	Report
2 Mar	18:00	Dukla Liberec (Czech Republic)	0–3	(Italy) Copra Elior Piacenza	14–25	20–25	13–25			47–75	Report
2 Mar	14:30	Delecta Bydgoszcz (Poland)	3–2	(Russia) Ural Ufa	25–18	21–25	22–25	25–21	15–12	108–101	Report
Golden set		Delecta Bydgoszcz (Poland)	12–15	(Russia) Ural Ufa							

=== Final ===
Team 1	Agg.	Team 2	1st leg	2nd leg
Ural Ufa (Russia)	0–2	(Italy) Copra Elior Piacenza	0–3	0–3

==== First leg ====
Date	Time		Score		Set 1	Set 2	Set 3	Set 4	Set 5	Total	Report
20 Mar	19:00	Ural Ufa (Russia)	0–3	(Italy) Copra Elior Piacenza	12–25	22–25	30–32			64–82	Report

==== Second leg ====
Date	Time		Score		Set 1	Set 2	Set 3	Set 4	Set 5	Total	Report
24 Mar	18:00	Copra Elior Piacenza (Italy)	3–0	(Russia) Ural Ufa	25–22	25–18	25–16			75–56	Report

== Final standing ==
Rank	Team
1st place, gold medalist(s)	(Italy) Copra Elior Piacenza
2nd place, silver medalist(s)	(Russia) Ural Ufa
Semifinalists	(Poland) Delecta Bydgoszcz
Semifinalists	(Czech Republic) Dukla Liberec
