= Argentina at the 1972 Winter Olympics =

- IOC code: ARG
- NOC: Argentine Olympic Committee
- Website: www.coarg.org.ar (in Spanish)

in Sapporo
- Competitors: 2 (men) in 1 sport
- Medals: Gold 0 Silver 0 Bronze 0 Total 0

Winter Olympics appearances (overview)
- 1928; 1932–1936; 1948; 1952; 1956; 1960; 1964; 1968; 1972; 1976; 1980; 1984; 1988; 1992; 1994; 1998; 2002; 2006; 2010; 2014; 2018; 2022; 2026

Argentina competed at the 1972 Winter Olympics in Sapporo, Japan.

== Alpine skiing ==
Men

Athlete	Event	Race 1		Race 2		Total	
Athlete	Event	Time	Rank	Time	Rank	Time	Rank
Jorge-Emilio Lazzarini	Downhill					2:08.29	51
Carlos Perner	Downhill					2:03.69	47
Jorge-Emilio Lazzarini	Giant Slalom	1:48.72	47	1:54.96	38	3:43.68	38
Carlos Perner	Giant Slalom	?	43	DNF	–	DNF	–

Men's slalom

Athlete	Classification		Final					
Athlete	Time	Rank	Time 1	Rank	Time 2	Rank	Total	Rank
Carlos Perner	DSQ	–	1:08.72	41	1:07.80	30	2:16.52	30
Jorge-Emilio Lazzarini	2:33.86	8	1:10.45	42	1:08.49	31	2:18.94	31
