= Federico Cichero =

Argentine cross-country skier (born 1983)

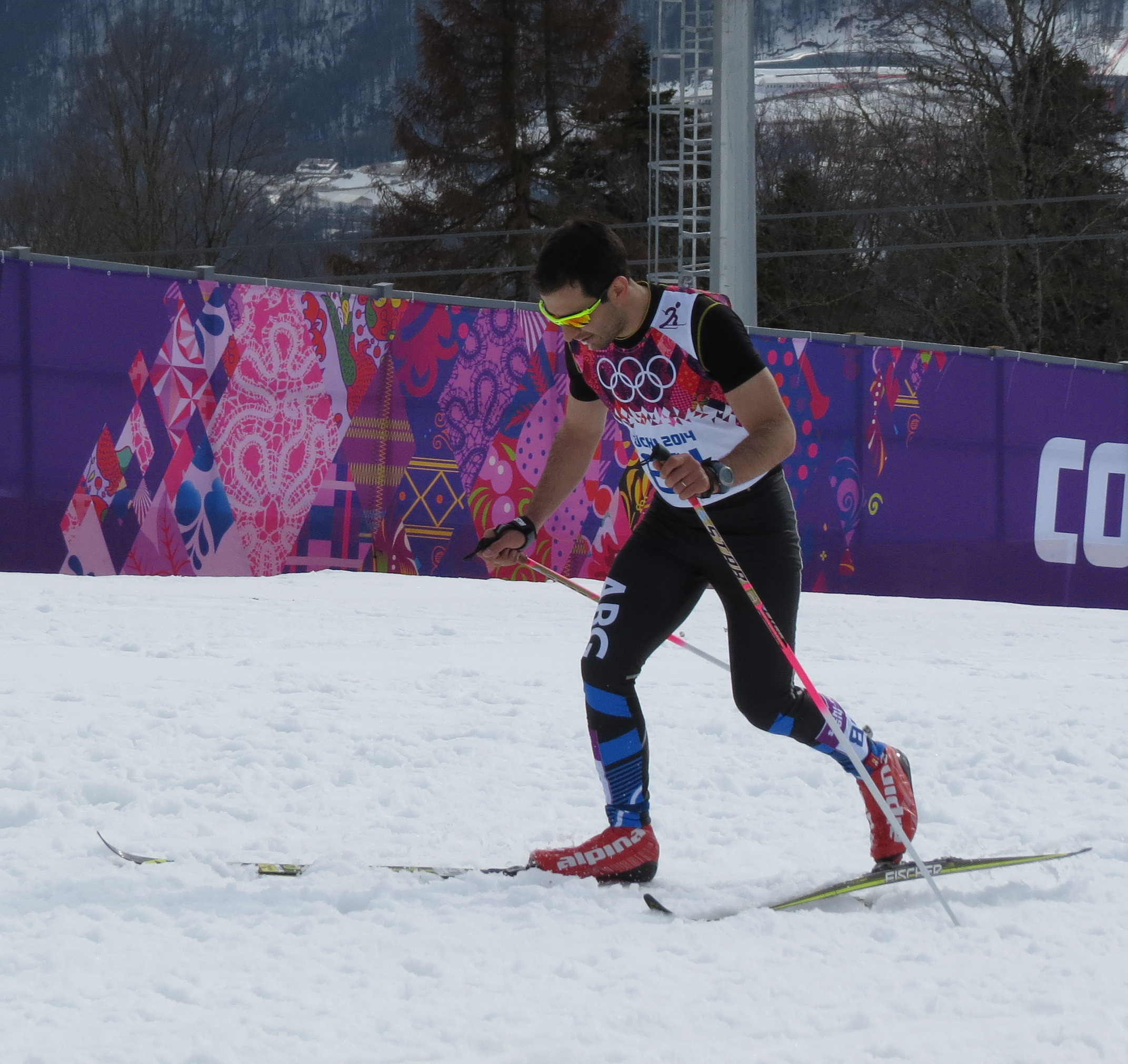
- Cichero in 2014

Personal information
- Full name: Federico Pablo Cichero
- Nationality: Argentine
- Born: 9 October 1983 (age 41); Ushuaia

Sport
- Country: Argentina
- Sport: Cross-country skiing
- Club: Club Andino Ushuaia

Federico Pablo Cichero (born 9 October 1983) is a cross-country skier from Argentina. He competed for Argentina at the 2014 Winter Olympics in the 15 kilometre classical race and finished 83rd out of 92 competitors with a time of 49:11.3.
