= Mariano López =

Argentine snowboarder (born 1973)

Personal information
- Nationality: Argentine
- Born: 29 March 1973 (age 53)

Sport
- Sport: Snowboarding

Mariano López (born 29 March 1973) is an Argentine snowboarder. He competed in the men's giant slalom event at the 1998 Winter Olympics.
