= Salvador Correa =

Argentine bobsledder (1916–2002)

Salvador María Correa Keen (28 May 1916 in Buenos Aires – 20 June 2002) was an Argentine bobsledder who competed in the late 1940s. At the 1948 Winter Olympics in St. Moritz, he finished 12th in the four-man event.
