= Justo del Carril =

Argentine alpine skier and bobsledder (1923–2008)

Justo Ricardo del Carril Aldao (13 December 1923 – 10 February 2008) was an Argentine alpine skier and bobsledder who competed in the 1948 Winter Olympics. As a bobsledder he finished twelfth in the 1948 four man competition. As an alpine skier he finished 63rd in the 1948 downhill event. He died in February 2008 at the age of 84.
