= Jorge Salas (biathlete) =

Argentine biathlete (born 1942)

Jorge Salas OLY
Personal information
- Nationality: Argentine
- Born: 27 August 1942 (age 83)

Sport
- Sport: Biathlon

== Biography ==
Jorge Salas (born 27 August 1942) is an Argentine biathlete. He competed from 1977 until 1981 in the world championship relay and individual.

He is now Miembro Ejecutivo- Executive Board Member en Union.

== Biathlon Results ==
Date	Discipline	Competition	Result	Time
15/02/1981	Relay	World cup	19	2:18:00.7
14/02/1981	Sprint	World cup	80	45:03.5
12/02/1981	Individual	World cup	74	1:43:17.8
19/02/1980	Sprint	Olympic game	49	47:12.58
19/02/1980	Individual 20 km	Olympic game	DNF	47:12.58
19/02/1980	Relay	Olympic game	DNF	47:12.58
05/03/1978	Relay	World cup	22	2:20:41.2
02/03/1978	Individual	World cup	78	1:44:48.2
