= Francisco Jerman =

Argentine cross-country skier (1920–1980)

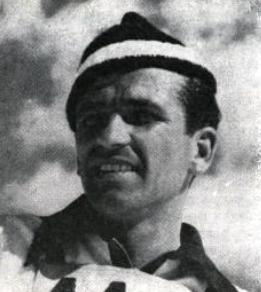

Personal information
- Nationality: Argentine
- Born: 16 October 1920; Zaboršt, Yugoslavia
- Died: 19 March 1980 (aged 59); Bariloche, Argentina

Sport
- Country: Argentina
- Sport: Cross-country skiing

Francisco Jerman (16 October 1920 – 19 March 1980) was a Slovenian-Argentine cross-country skier. He competed in the men's 15 kilometre event at the 1960 Winter Olympics.

His sons Marcos Luis Jerman, Martín Tomás Jerman and Matías José Jerman were also Olympic cross-country skiers for Argentina.
