= Janez Flere =

Argentine alpine skier (born 1959)

Personal information
- Nationality: Argentine
- Born: 6 May 1959 (age 67)

Sport
- Sport: Alpine skiing

Janez Flere (born 6 May 1959) is an Argentine alpine skier. He competed in two events at the 1980 Winter Olympics.
