= Norberto Quiroga =

Argentine alpine skier (born 1959)

Personal information
- Born: 25 September 1959 (age 67) San Carlos de Bariloche, Argentina

Sport
- Sport: Alpine skiing

Norberto Quiroga (born 25 September 1959) is an Argentine alpine skier. He competed in three events at the 1980 Winter Olympics.
