= Sebastiano Gastaldi =

Argentine alpine skier (born 1991)

Personal information
- Born: 12 June 1991 (age 35) Piove di Sacco, Italy
- Height: 171 cm (5 ft 7 in)
- Weight: 73 kg (161 lb)

Sport
- Country: Argentina
- Sport: Alpine skiing
- Club: Club Andino Bariloche

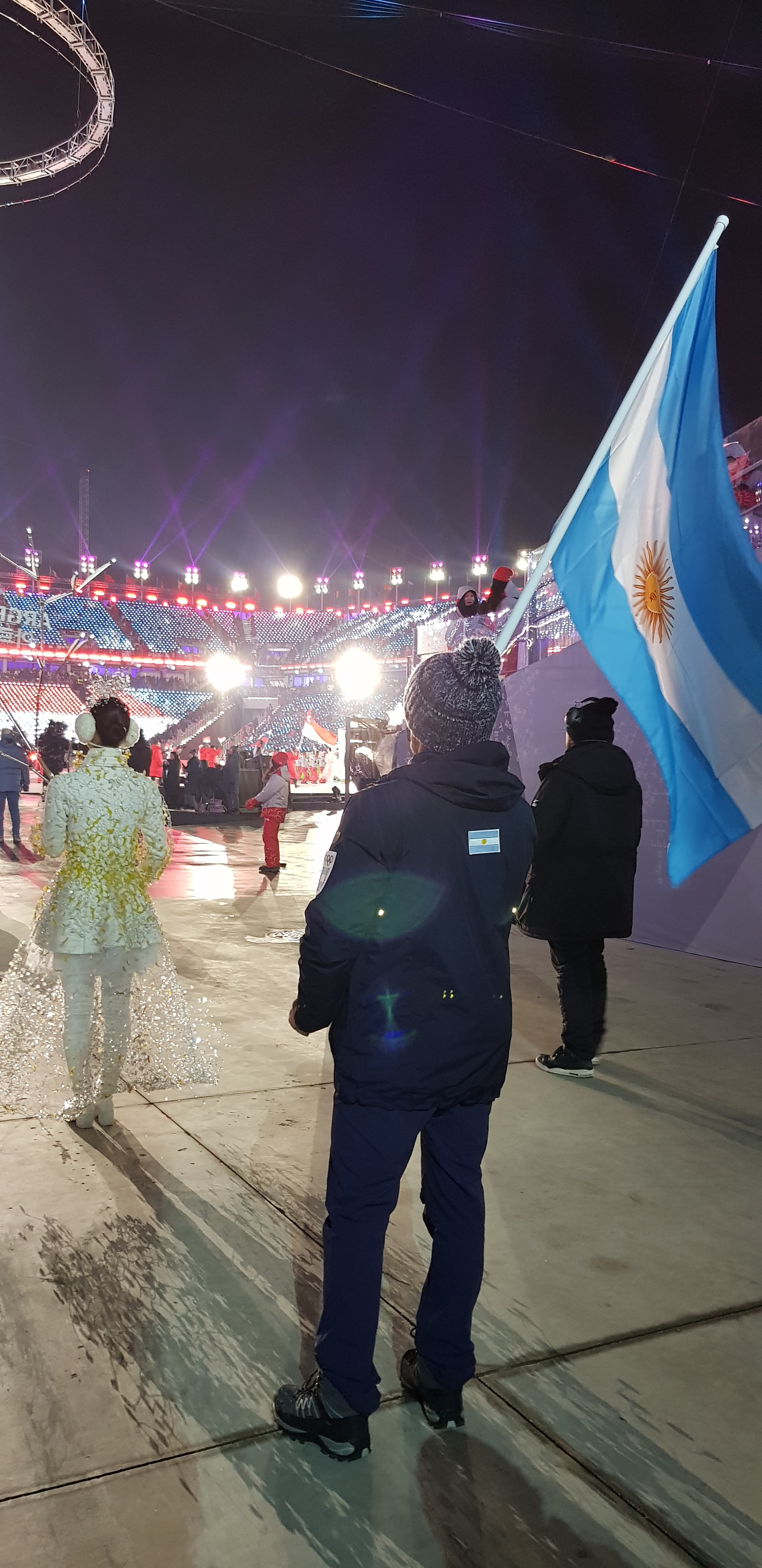
Sebastiano Gastaldi as The Flag Bearer of Argentina during the parade of nations of the opening ceremony of the 2018 Winter Olympics.

Sebastiano Gastaldi (born 12 June 1991 in Piove di Sacco) is an alpine skier from Argentina. He competed for Argentina at the 2014 Winter Olympics in the slalom and giant slalom. He competed at the 2018 Winter Olympics in the men's giant slalom.

His sister is also a skier, Nicol Gastaldi.

Olympic Games
Preceded by Luis Scola	Flag bearer for Argentina; 2018 Pyeongchang	Succeeded by Cecilia Carranza; Santiago Lange
