= Roberto Thostrup =

Argentine alpine skier (born 1942)

Personal information
- Born: 7 August 1942 (age 83) San Carlos de Bariloche, Argentina
- Died: 28 April 2024 San Carlos de Bariloche,

Sport
- Sport: Alpine skiing

Roberto Thostrup was born on 7 August 1942 in San Carlos de Bariloche, Río Negro, Argentina. He is an Argentine alpine skier, who competed in three events at the 1968 Winter Olympics.
