= Luis Ríos =

Argentine biathlete (born 1953)

Personal information
- Born: 30 May 1953 (age 71); Buenos Aires, Argentina

Sport
- Sport: Biathlon

Luis Ríos (born 30 May 1953) is an Argentine biathlete. He competed at the 1980 Winter Olympics, the 1984 Winter Olympics and the 1992 Winter Olympics.
