= Canción de la nieve =

- Directed by: Guzzi Lantschner
- Written by: Guzzi Lantschner, Zulema H. Sullivan
- Narrated by: Guzzi Lantschner, Marisa Núñez, Cristina Pall
- Cinematography: Julio C. Lavera
- Music by: Peter Kreuder
- Release date: 3 June 1954
- Running time: 80 minutes
- Country: Argentina
- Language: Spanish

Canción de la nieve is a 1954 film of the classical era of Argentine cinema.

== Cast ==
- Guzzi Lantschner
- Marisa Núñez
- Cristina Pall
- Elsa Trinner
