= Raúl Abella =

Argentine biathlete (born 1953)

Personal information
- Nationality: Argentine
- Born: 21 April 1953 (age 71)

Sport
- Sport: Biathlon

Raúl Daniel Abella (born 21 April 1953) is an Argentine biathlete. He competed in the 1980 Winter Olympics.
