= Guillermo Giumelli =

Argentine alpine skier (born 1962)

Personal information
- Nationality: Argentine
- Born: 21 March 1962 (age 64)

Sport
- Sport: Alpine skiing

Guillermo Giumelli (born 21 March 1962) is an Argentine alpine skier. He competed in three events at the 1980 Winter Olympics.
