= Otto Jung =

Argentine alpine skier (1930–1998)

Personal information
- Born: 12 July 1930; San Carlos de Bariloche, Argentina
- Died: 8 May 1998 (aged 67); San Carlos de Bariloche, Argentina

Sport
- Sport: Alpine skiing

Otto Jung (12 July 1930 – 8 May 1998) was an Argentine alpine skier. He competed at the 1948 Winter Olympics and the 1952 Winter Olympics.
