= Gino de Pellegrín =

Argentine alpine skier (1926–2004)

Personal information
- Born: 7 September 1926; San Carlos de Bariloche, Argentina
- Died: 26 May 2004 (aged 77); San Carlos de Bariloche, Argentina

Sport
- Sport: Alpine skiing

Gino de Pellegrín (7 September 1926 – 26 May 2004) was an Argentine alpine skier. He competed at the 1948 Winter Olympics and the 1952 Winter Olympics.
