= Verónica Ravenna =

Argentine luger (born 1998)

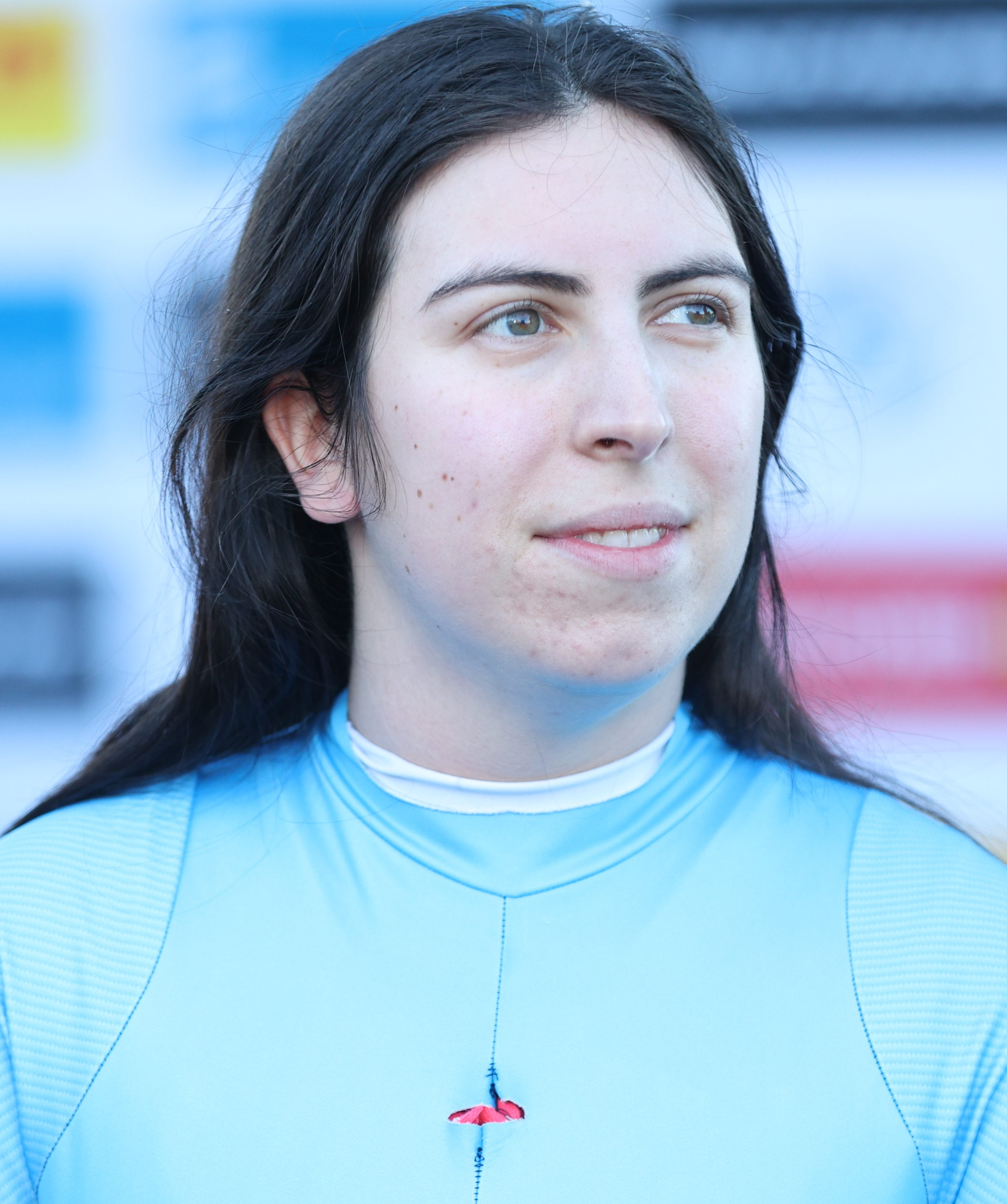
- Ravenna at the 2024–25 Luge World Cup in December 2024

Personal information
- Full name: Verónica María Ravenna
- Born: 19 February 1998 (age 28) Buenos Aires, Argentina

Sport
- Country: Argentina
- Sport: Luge

Verónica María Ravenna (Spanish pronunciation: [beˈɾonika maˈɾi.a raˈβena]; born 19 February 1998) is an Argentine luger. She competed in the women's singles event at the 2018, 2022, and 2026 Winter Olympics.

== Early life ==
When she was six years old, she moved with her family to Vancouver, Canada.

== Career ==
Ravenna began her sport career when she was eleven years old, after learning about luge while visiting the Whistler Sliding Centre during a school visit. In 2014 she suffered a clavicle fracture, which prevented her from joining the Canadian youth team. The following year, she received an invitation from the Argentine Luge Federation to represent her birth country in the 2014-2015 world cup hosted in Oberhof, Germany.

Ravenna participated in the 2016 Winter Youth Olympics that took place in Lillehammer, Norway. She was the flag bearer during the closing ceremony. She finished in the seventh place and won an Olympic diploma.

Then she competed in the 2017 FIL World Luge Championships hosted in Innsbruck, Austria, where she finished in 23rd place in the mayors category and the tenth place in Sub 23. She also took part in the 2016–2017 and 2017–2018 World Cup editions where she finished in the 35th place and 58th place respectively. In 2018, she was ranked 25th in the youth world championship held in Altenberg, Germany.

Ravenna qualified for the 2018 Winter Olympics hosted in Pyeongchang, South Korea after a quota place was released. She competed for the first time in the women's singles event in Luge. She was the second Argentine woman to compete in luge in an Olympic Games, after the participation of Michelle Despain in the 2006 Winter Olympics. At 19 years old, she was the youngest of the Argentine delegation and the only one that competed in an ice sport. She finished in 24th place, the same rank that her predecessor, Michelle Despain, achieved during the 2006 Winter Olympics in Turin, Italy.

After the Olympics, Ravenna became a regular competitor on the Luge World Cup circuit. During the 2018–2019 season, she achieved a career-best World Cup finish of 17th in Altenberg. She also competed at the 2019 FIL U23 World Championships that season, where she finished sixth.

Ravenna competed at the 2022 Winter Olympics in Beijing, China. She was the only one of Argentina's six athletes to have previously competed at the Winter Olympics. In the women's singles event, she again finished 24th.

Ravenna continued to compete on the Luge World Cup circuit, recording another 17th-place finish in Lake Placid during the 2023–2024 season. She achieved her best World Championship result to date by finishing 20th at the 2025 World Championships in Whistler.

Ravenna competed at the 2026 Winter Olympics in Cortina d'Ampezzo, Italy. She was once again the only Argentine athlete competing in an ice sport. She finished in 22nd place, her highest Olympic finish. With this result, she became the first South American female luger to compete in three Olympic Games.

== Gallery ==
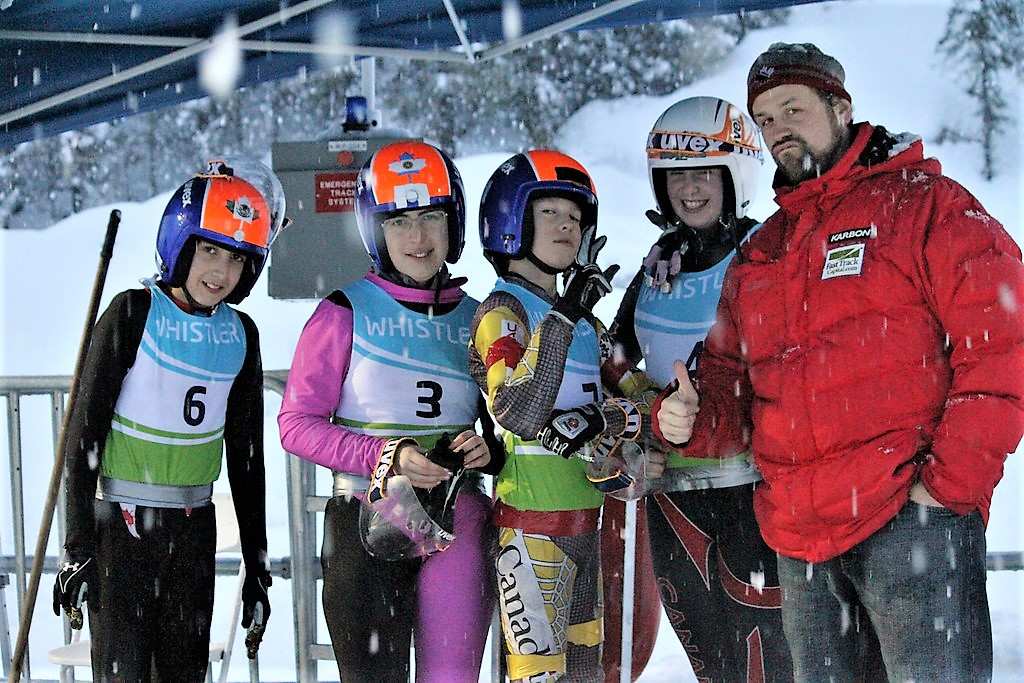
Training with the British Columbia Provincial Luge Team in March 2011.

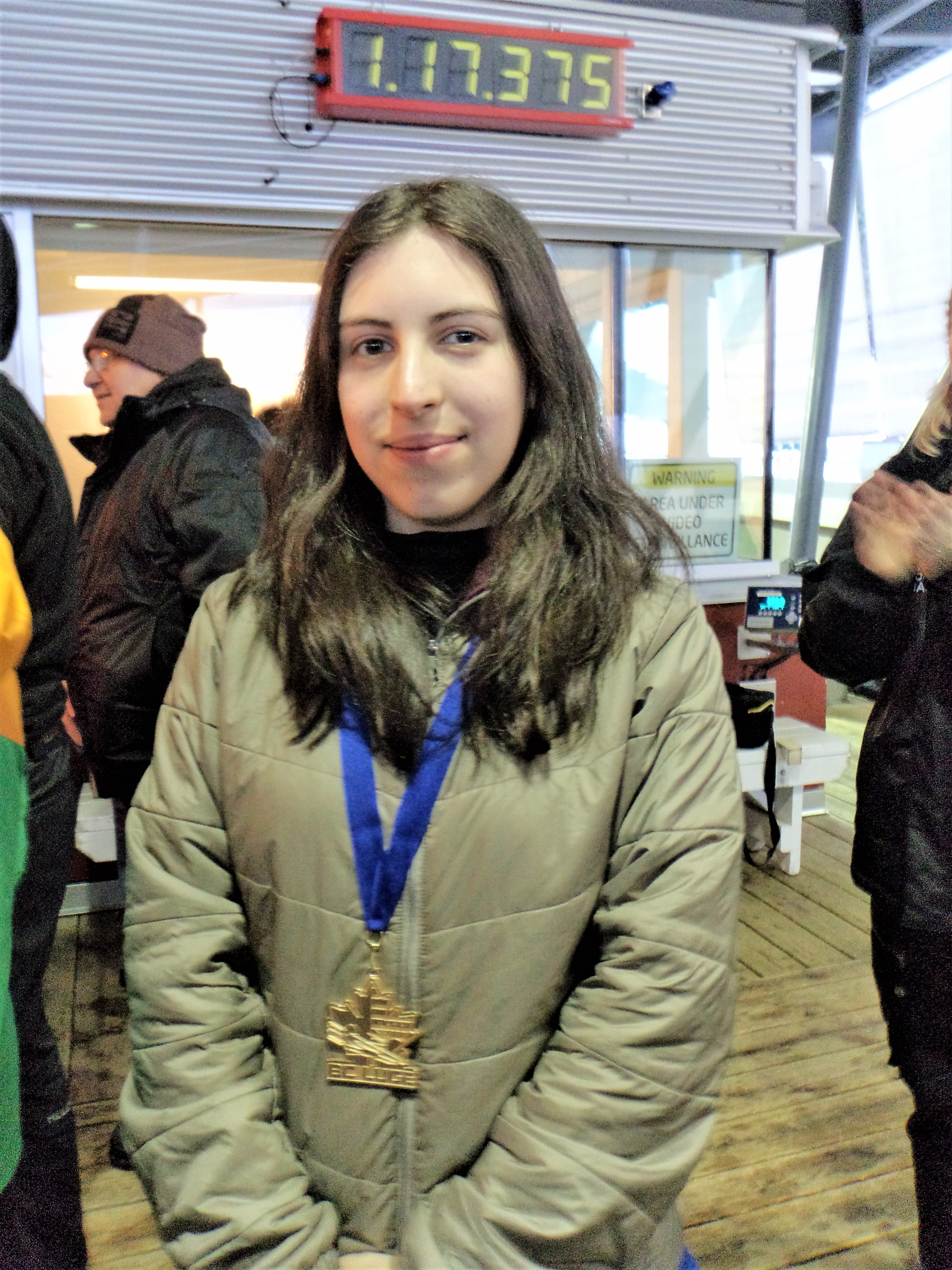
Ravenna wears her gold medal after winning the 2014 provincial championship.

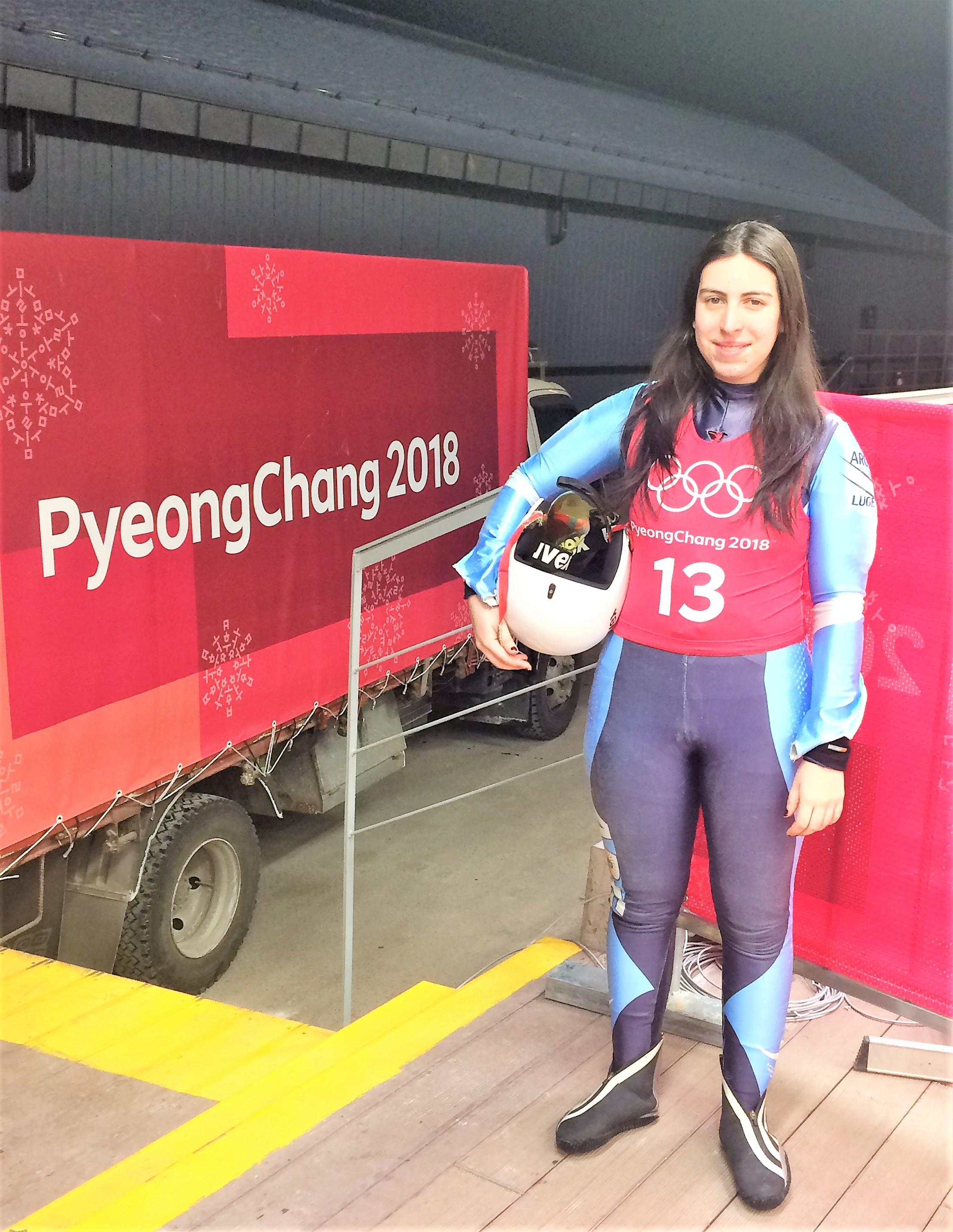
During the 2018 Winter Olympics.

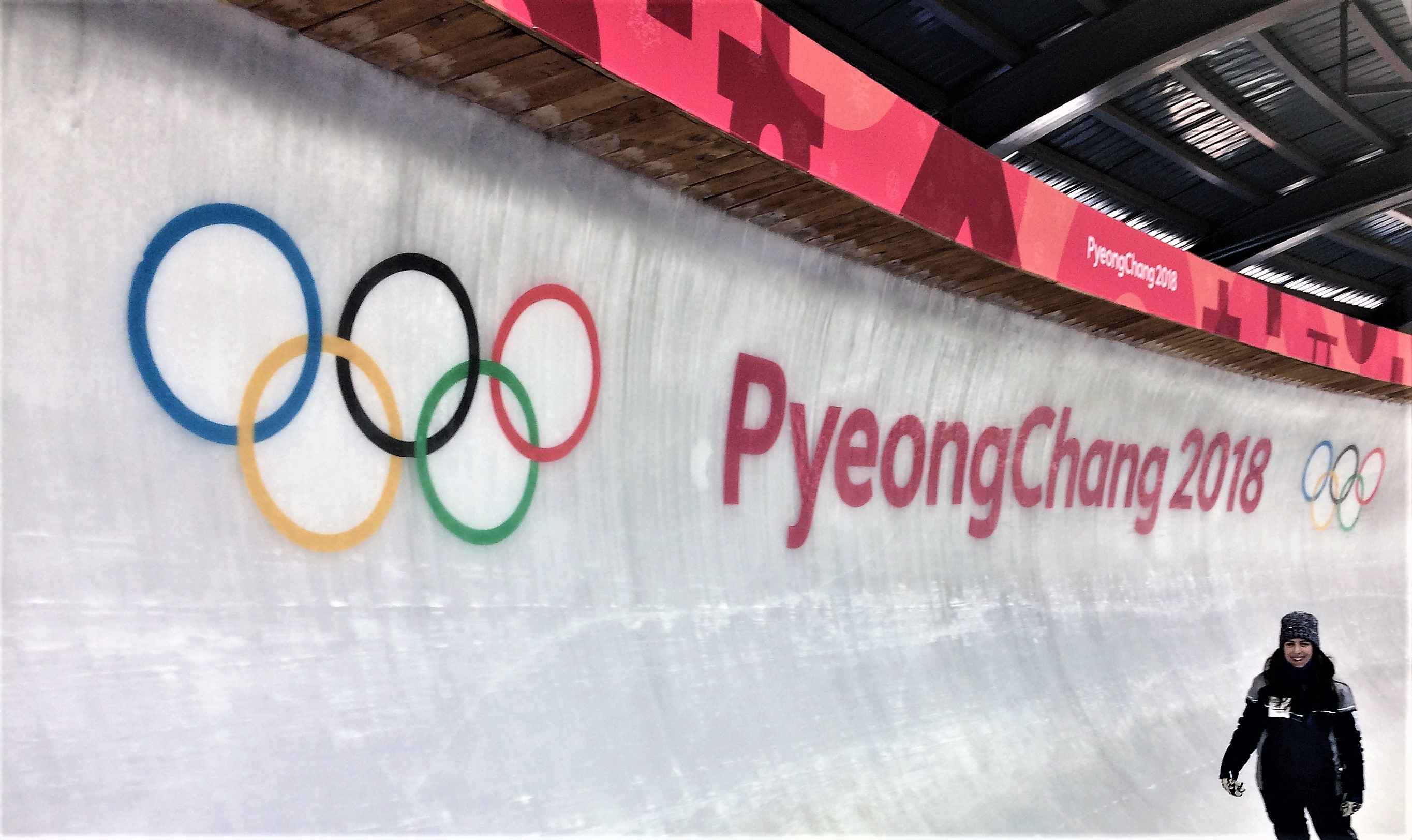
At the Alpensia Sliding Centre, Pyeongchang 2018.

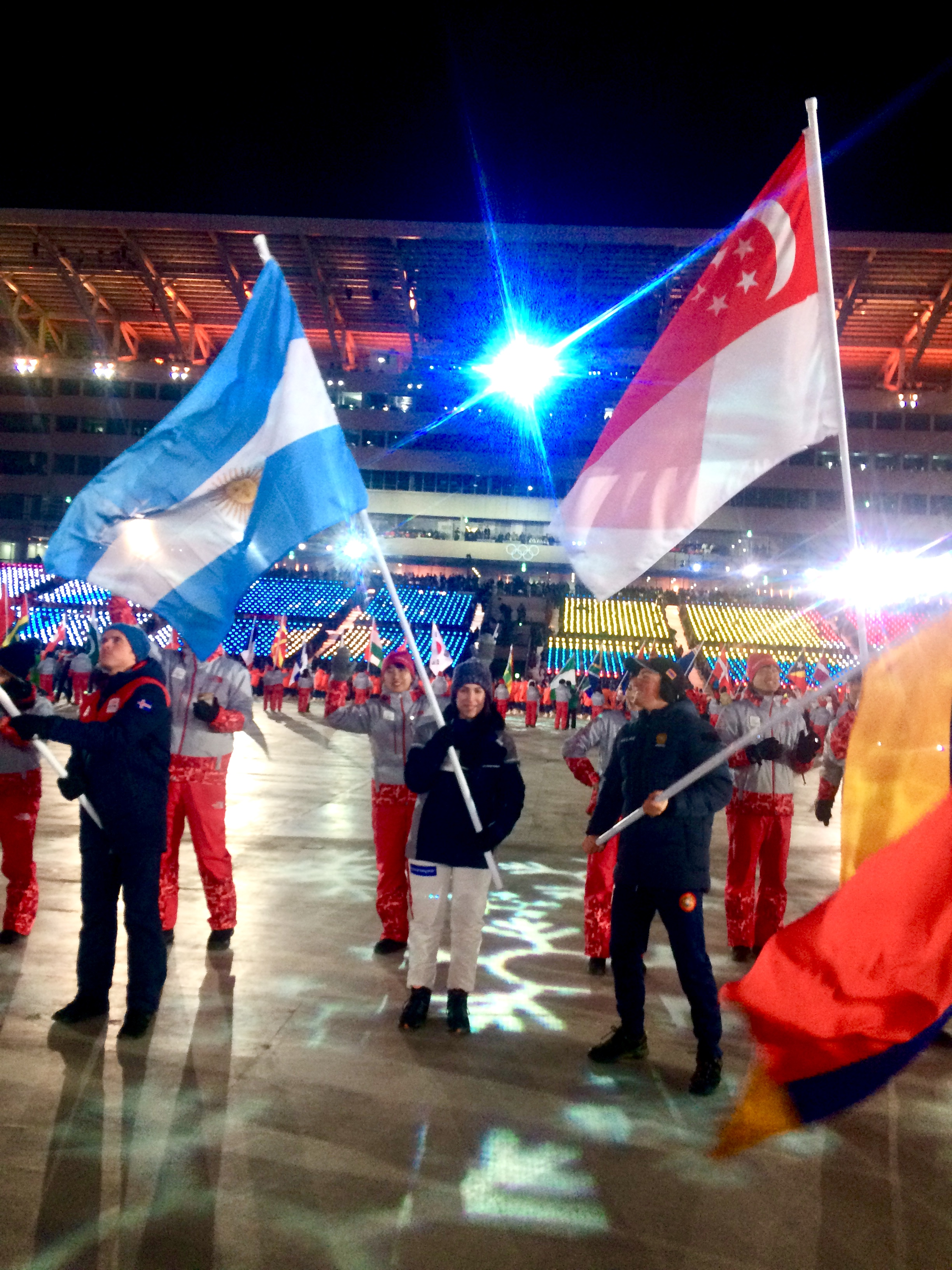
As flag bearer during the 2018 Winter Olympics closing ceremony.

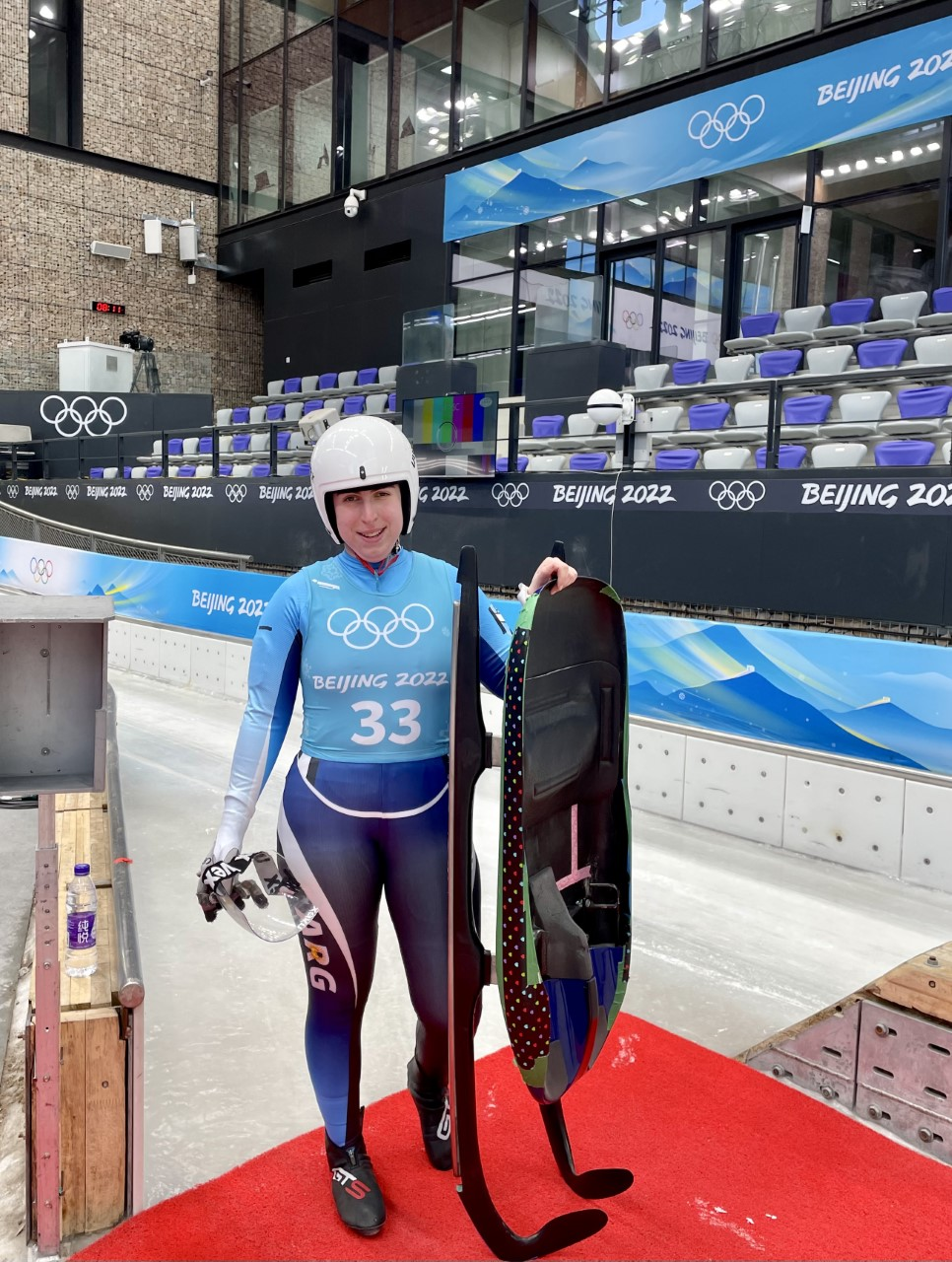
At the Yanqing National Sliding Centre, Beijing 2022.
