= Clyde Getty =

Argentine freestyle skier (born 1961)

Clyde Getty (born 22 September 1961) is an Argentine freestyle skier. Getty was born in the United States to Argentinian parents.

== Career ==
Although Clyde Getty qualified for the US team, he opted to join the Argentinian Olympic Ski Team instead, because of his lineage. Getty competed in the Torino Olympics Men's freestyle skiing and was the oldest competitor at the event.

In 1989 Getty became a member of the US Freestyle Skiing Team. After finishing, Getty continued to manage his computer systems consulting business, GettySystems.
