= Matías José Jerman =

Argentine cross-country skier (born 1956)

Personal information
- Nationality: Argentine
- Born: 30 January 1956 (age 69)

Sport
- Country: Argentina
- Sport: Cross-country skiing

Matías José Jerman (born 30 January 1956) is an Argentine cross-country skier. He competed at the 1976 Winter Olympics and the 1980 Winter Olympics.

His father Francisco Jerman and brothers Marcos Luis Jerman and Martín Tomás Jerman were also Olympic cross-country skiers for Argentina.
