= Martín Tomás Jerman =

Argentine cross-country skier (born 1959)

Personal information
- Nationality: Argentine
- Born: 21 April 1959 (age 65)

Sport
- Country: Argentina
- Sport: Cross-country skiing

Martín Tomás Jerman (born 21 April 1959) is an Argentine cross-country skier. He competed at the 1976 Winter Olympics and the 1980 Winter Olympics.

His father Francisco Jerman and brothers Marcos Luis Jerman and Matías José Jerman were also Olympic cross-country skiers for Argentina.
