= Franco Dal Farra =

Argentine cross-country skier (born 2000)

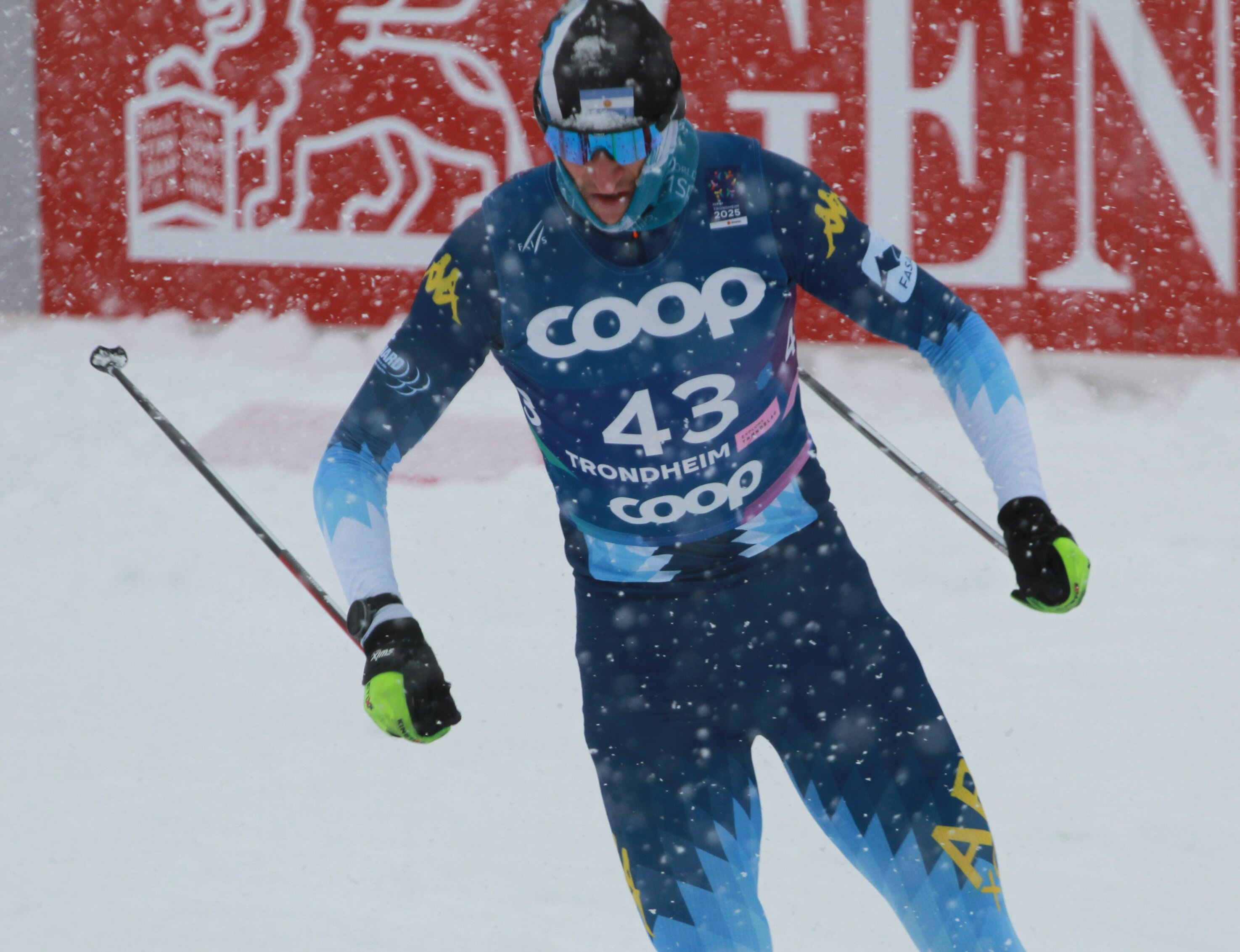
- Dal Farra at the 2025 FIS Nordic World Ski Championships

Personal information
- Nationality: Argentina
- Born: 16 July 2000 (age 26) Bariloche, Argentina

Sport
- Sport: Skiing
- Club: Club Andino Bariloche

World Cup career
- Seasons: 4 – (2022, 2024–present)
- Indiv. starts: 39
- Indiv. podiums: 0
- Team starts: 0
- Team podiums: 0
- Overall titles: 0 – (190th in 2026)
- Discipline titles: 0
- Updated on 4 April 2026

Franco Dal Farra (born 16 July 2000) is an Argentine cross-country skier. He was the flag bearer for Argentina at the 2022 and 2026 Parade of Nations.

On 20 March 2026, Dal Farra scored six World Cup points by placing 45th in a 10 km race in Lake Placid.

== Biography ==
Dal Farra was born on 16 July 2000 in Bariloche, Argentina. His mother, Inés Alder, and uncle, Guillermo Alder, was part of the Argentine delegation at the 1992 Albertville Olympic Games. His brother, Marco Dal Farra, was part of the Argentine delegation at the Lillehammer 2016 Youth Olympic Games.

His FIS debut came in 2015. He got 6th out of 10th in a junior 10 km race in Ushuaia.

Between 2015 and 2018, Dal Farra was also a competitive rower. He was part of the Argentine junior national team. He finished second in the junior quadruple sculls at the 2017 South American Youth Games, and in 2018, was Argentine junior champion rowing in a pairs.

== Results ==
All results are sourced from the International Ski Federation (FIS).

=== Olympic Games ===
Year	Age	Individual	Skiathlon	Mass start	Sprint	Relay	Team sprint
2022	21	86	65	—^{[a]}	74	—	—
2026	25	58	61	39	62	—	25

^{a} Distance reduced to 30 km due to weather conditions.

=== World Championships ===
Year	Age	15 km individual	30 km skiathlon	50 km mass start	Sprint	4 × 10 km relay	Team sprint
2019	18	KQLF	LAP	—	92	—	—
2021	20	68	64	51	95	—	—
2023	22	80	50	46	65	—	26
2025	24	76	61	48	60	—	27

=== World Cup ===
Season	Discipline standings			Ski Tour standings		
Season	Overall	Distance	Sprint	Nordic Opening	Tour de Ski	Ski Tour 2020
2022	NC	NC	NC	—N/a	DNF	—N/a
2024	NC	NC	NC	—N/a	—	—N/a
2025	NC	NC	NC	—N/a	—	—N/a
2026	190	136	NC	—N/a	64	—N/a

Olympic Games
Preceded by Cecilia Carranza; Santiago Lange	Flagbearer for Argentina; Beijing 2022 with Francesca Baruzzi Farriol	Succeeded by Luciano De Cecco; Rocío Sánchez Moccia

Olympic Games
Preceded by Luciano De Cecco; Rocío Sánchez Moccia	Flagbearer for Argentina; Milano–Cortina 2026 with Francesca Baruzzi Farriol	Succeeded by incumbent
