= Roberto Bordeu =

Argentine bobsledder (1931–2006)

Roberto José Bordeu Baliero (13 August 1931 – 23 June 2006) was an Argentine bobsledder who competed from the early 1950s to the mid-1960s. Competing in two Winter Olympics, he earned his best finish of eighth in the four-man event at Oslo in 1952. Twelve years later he finished 16th in the four-man event at the 1964 Winter Olympics. Bordeu died on 23 June 2006, at the age of 74.
