= Marcos Luis Jerman =

Argentine cross-country skier (born 1957)

Marcos Luis Jerman (born 20 January 1957), also known as Marko Jerman, is a Slovenian stained glass artist and former Olympic cross-country skier.

== Life ==
Jerman was born in San Carlos de Bariloche, Argentina. After finishing secondary school he began studying art with the academic artist Juan Antonio Spotorno in Buenos Aires, afterwards with Rafael Roca in Bariloche.

He began to plan, draw and set up stained glass windows in 1981, when he was apprentice of Sante Pizzol in Milan.

In 1991, Marko Jerman, his wife Marjanka and their family moved to Slovenia. He lives and works in Godovič.

== Work ==
Marko Jerman's stained glass can be seen in many churches in Slovenia, Croatia, Argentina, Austria, and in some private buildings also: St. Family Ljubljana Moste, Preska and Sora pri Medvodah, Vrhpolje near Vipavi, Maribor dome, Hoče near Mariboru, Ljubično (Poljčane), monastery in Kamnik, Šentjošt (Horjulom), Zaplana, Kamnik under Krim, Poreč, Čirče at Kranju, Šentjakob at Sava, Nova Oselica, Hrušica, Lago Bueno (patagonia, Arg.), Velenje, Hrušica (Ilirski Bistrici), Velenje, Kranj Ljubljana, Gore (Idrija), Dragatuš, Ponikva (Velenje), Kralj Matjaž, Velenje, Bevke, Buenos Aires (Rožmanov dom), Col, Zaplana.

== Winter Olympics ==
Jerman represented Argentina in cross-country skiing at the 1976 and 1980 Winter Olympics. His father Francisco Jerman and brothers Martín Tomás Jerman and Matías José Jerman were also Olympic cross-country skiers for Argentina.
