= Marcello de Ridder =

Argentine bobsledder (1922–1973)

Marcello Ives de Ridder Perrier (7 June 1922 – 7 January 1973) was an Argentine bobsledder who competed in the late 1940s. At the 1948 Winter Olympics in St. Moritz, he finished 12th in the four-man and 15th in the two-man events.
