= Pablo Rosenkjer =

Argentine alpine skier (1930–2020)

Personal information
- Born: 8 September 1930; San Carlos de Bariloche, Argentina
- Died: 7 February 2020 (aged 89)

Sport
- Sport: Alpine skiing

Pablo Rosenkjer (8 September 1930 – 7 February 2020) was an Argentine alpine skier. He competed at the 1948 Winter Olympics and the 1952 Winter Olympics.
