= Carlos Tomasi =

Argentine bobsledder (1930–2017)

Carlos Alberto Tomasi (1 March 1930 – 13 August 2017) was an Argentine bobsledder who competed from the early 1950s to the mid-1960s. Competing in two Winter Olympics, he achieved his best finish of eighth in the four-man bobsleigh event at the 1952 Oslo games. Twelve years later he finished 16th in the four-man event at the 1964 Winter Olympics.
