= Luis de Ridder =

Argentine alpine skier (1928–2004)

Personal information
- Born: 23 February 1928; Buenos Aires, Argentina
- Died: 31 July 2004 (aged 76); Buenos Aires, Argentina

Sport
- Sport: Alpine skiing

Luis de Ridder (23 February 1928 – 31 July 2004) was an Argentine alpine skier. He competed at the 1948 Winter Olympics and the 1952 Winter Olympics.
