= Héctor Tomasi =

Argentine bobsledder (1928–2022)

Héctor Julio Tomasi (5 July 1928 – 13 November 2022) was an Argentine bobsledder who competed from the late 1940s to the mid-1960s.

== Biography ==
Héctor Julio Tomasi was born in Buenos Aires on 5 July 1928. Competing in three Winter Olympics, he earned his best finish of eighth in the four-man event at Oslo in 1952. He also finished twelfth in the four-man event as well as 15th in the two-man event at the 1948 Winter Olympics. At the 1964 Winter Olympics he finished 16th in the four-man event and 18th in the two-man event. Tomasi died in Buenos Aires on 13 November 2022, at the age of 94.
