= Cristian Javier Simari Birkner =

Argentine alpine skier (born 1980)

Cristian Simari Birkner
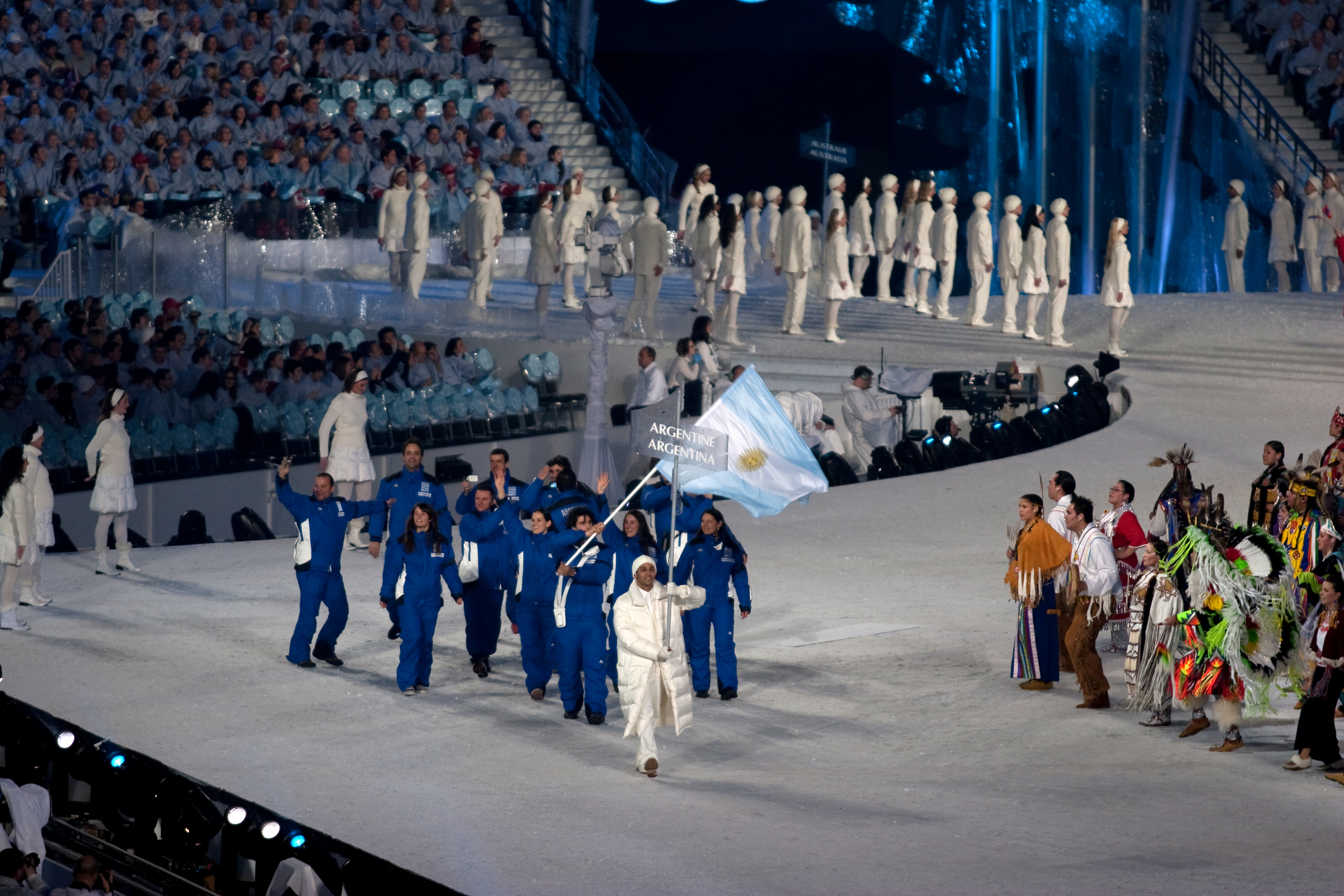

Personal information
- Full name: Cristian Javier Simari Birkner
- Born: 4 October 1980 (age 45) Bariloche, Argentina
- Height: 184 cm (6 ft 0 in)
- Weight: 86 kg (190 lb)

Sport
- Country: Argentina
- Sport: Alpine skiing
- Club: Club Andino Bariloche

Cristian Javier Simari Birkner (born 4 October 1980 in San Carlos de Bariloche) is an Argentine alpine skier. He competed in the 2002, 2006 and 2010 Winter Olympics. He served as Argentina's flag bearer at the 2010 Winter Olympics opening ceremony. and followed in 2014 as flagbearer. He is the brother of fellow alpine skiers María Belén Simari Birkner and Macarena Simari Birkner.
