= Argentine Olympic Committee =

National Olympic Committee

- Country: Argentina
- Code: ARG
- Created: 31 December 1923; 101 years ago
- Recognized: 1923
- Continental Association: PASO
- Headquarters: Buenos Aires, Argentina
- President: Mario Moccia
- Website: coarg.org.ar

The Argentine Olympic Committee (Spanish: Comité Olímpico Argentino, COA; IOC Code: ARG) is the National Olympic Committee representing Argentina's athletes in the International Olympic Committee (IOC), the Pan American Games and the South American Games.

It is based in Buenos Aires.

== History ==
The COA was created by the president of Argentina Marcelo T. de Alvear in 1923 and recognized by International Olympic Committee in the same year.

== Presidents ==
President	Term
Pablo Cagnasso	1973–1977
Antonio Rodríguez	1977–2005
Julio Ernesto Cassanello	2005–2008
Alicia Masoni de Morea	2008–2009
Gerardo Werthein	2009–2021
Mario Moccia	2021–present

== See also ==
- Argentina at the Olympics
- Argentine Paralympic Committee
- Argentina at the Pan American Games
