= Polo at the Summer Olympics =

- IOC Code: POL
- Governing body: FIP
- Events: 1 (men)

Summer Olympics
- 1896; 1900; 1904; 1908; 1912; 1920; 1924; 1928; 1932; 1936; 1948; 1952; 1956; 1960; 1964; 1968; 1972; 1976; 1980; 1984; 1988; 1992; 1996; 2000; 2004; 2008; 2012; 2016; 2020; 2024; 2028; 2032
- Medalists

Polo was introduced in the Summer Olympics at the 1900 Games. It was contested in another four Olympics before being removed from the official programme after the 1936 Summer Olympics.

Polo declined in relative popularity around the time of World War II due at least in part to the logistical and financial difficulties of competing in the sport. In 1996, the International Olympic Committee voted to classify polo as a recognized sport.

Polo was accepted as a demonstration sport for the 2018 Summer Youth Olympics.

== Events ==
Event	96	00	04	08	12	20	24	28	32	36	48	52	56	60	64	68	72	76	80	84	88	92	96	00	04	08	Years
Men's tournament		X		X		X	X			X																	5
Events	-	1	-	1	-	1	1	-	-	1	-	-	-	-	-	-	-	-	-	-	-	-	-	-	-	-	1
Year	96	00	04	08	12	20	24	28	32	36	48	52	56	60	64	68	72	76	80	84	88	92	96	00	04	08	5

== Tournaments ==
Year	Host	Gold medal game			Bronze medal game
Year	Host	Gold medalist	Score	Silver medalist	Bronze medalist	Score	Fourth place
1900; Details	(France); Paris	(United Kingdom); Great Britain (Foxhunters Hurlingham)	3–1	(United Kingdom); Great Britain (BLO Polo Club Rugby)	France (Bagatelle Polo Club de Paris); Mixed team (United States and Mexico)	Round Robin	—
1908; Details	(United Kingdom); London	(United Kingdom); Great Britain (Roehampton)	two matches	(United Kingdom); Great Britain (Hurlingham) (United Kingdom); Great Britain (Ireland)	—	only 3 teams	—
1920; Details	(Belgium); Antwerp	(United Kingdom); Great Britain	13–11	Spain	United States	11–3	Belgium
1924; Details	(France); Paris	Argentina	Round Robin	United States	(United Kingdom); Great Britain	Round Robin	Spain
1936; Details	(Germany); Berlin	Argentina	11–0	(United Kingdom); Great Britain	Mexico	16–2	Hungary

== Medal table ==
Rank	Nation	Gold	Silver	Bronze	Total
1	Great Britain	3	4	1	8
2	Argentina	2	0	0	2
3	United States	0	1	1	2
4	Spain	0	1	0	1
5	France	0	0	1	1
5	Mexico	0	0	1	1
5	Mixed team	0	0	1	1
Totals (7 entries)		5	6	5	16

== Players per nation ==
Number of nations and players per nation in the Olympic polo tournament by year
Year	1896	1900	1904	1908	1912	1920	1924	1928	1932	1936
Argentina		-		-		-	5			4
Belgium		-		-		4	-			-
France		6		-		-	5			-
Great Britain		7		12		4	4			4
Germany		-		-		-	-			4
Hungary		-		-		-	-			5
Mexico		4		-		-	-			4
Spain		-		-		4	6			-
United States		3		-		4	4			-
Number of nations	-	4	-	1	-	4	5	-	-	5

== Medalists ==
Among the contestants were 87 men from nine countries. The youngest participant was 21-year-old Roberto Cavanagh from Argentina, while the oldest was 52-year-old Justo San Miguel of Spain. The top country medal winner was Great Britain with six medals. No equestrian had more than two medals, but four riders, all from Great Britain, won two medals each. In 1900, at the first appearance of the sport, all medals went to "mixed teams", while in the second appearance at the 1908 Games, all medals went to British teams.

Games	Gold	Silver	Bronze
1900 Paris	Great Britain Denis St. George Daly (GBR); Foxhall Parker Keene (USA); Frank Mackey (USA); Alfred Rawlinson (GBR); John Beresford (GBR)	Great Britain Walter McCreery (USA); Frederick Freake (GBR); Walter Buckmaster (GBR); Jean de Madre (FRA)	France Frederick Agnew Gill (GBR); Robert Fournier-Sarlovèze (FRA); Edouard Alphonse de Rothschild (FRA); Maurice Raoul-Duval (FRA)
1900 Paris	Great Britain Denis St. George Daly (GBR); Foxhall Parker Keene (USA); Frank Mackey (USA); Alfred Rawlinson (GBR); John Beresford (GBR)	Great Britain Walter McCreery (USA); Frederick Freake (GBR); Walter Buckmaster (GBR); Jean de Madre (FRA)	Mixed team Eustaquio de Escandón (MEX); Manuel de Escandón (MEX); Pablo de Escandón (MEX); Guillermo Hayden Wright (USA)
1904 St. Louis	not included in the Olympic program		
1908 London	Great Britain; Charles Darley Miller; George Arthur Miller; Patteson Womersley Nickalls; Herbert Haydon Wilson	Great Britain; Walter Buckmaster; Frederick Freake; Walter Jones; John Wodehouse	none awarded
1908 London	Great Britain; Charles Darley Miller; George Arthur Miller; Patteson Womersley Nickalls; Herbert Haydon Wilson	Great Britain (Ireland); John Hardress Lloyd; John Paul McCann; Percy O'Reilly; Auston Rotherham	none awarded
1912 Stockholm	not included in the Olympic program		
1920 Antwerp	Great Britain; Teignmouth Philip Melvill; Frederick W. Barrett; John Wodehouse; Vivian Lockett	Spain; Leopoldo Saínz de la Maza; Duke of Peñaranda; Marquess of Villabrágima; José de Figueroa y Alonso-Martínez; Duke of Alba	United States; Arthur Harris; Terry Allen; John Montgomery; Nelson Margetts
1924 Paris	Argentina; Arturo Kenny; Juan Miles; Guillermo Naylor; Juan Nelson; Enrique Padilla	United States; Elmer Boeseke; Tommy Hitchcock, Jr. Frederick Roe; Rodman Wanamaker	Great Britain; Frederick Barrett; Dennis Bingham; Fred Guest; Kinnear Wise
1928-1932	not included in the Olympic program		
1936 Berlin	Argentina; Luis Duggan; Roberto Cavanagh; Andrés Gazzotti; Manuel Andrada; Diego Cavanagh	Great Britain; Bryan Fowler; William Hinde; David Dawnay; Humphrey Patrick Guinness	Mexico; Juan Gracia; Julio Mueller; Antonio Nava; Alberto Ramos

== See also ==
- List of Olympic venues in discontinued events
