= Mexico at the Olympics =

- IOC code: MEX
- NOC: Mexican Olympic Committee
- Website: www.soycom.org (in Spanish)
- Medals Ranked 52nd: Gold 13 Silver 27 Bronze 37 Total 77

Summer appearances
- 1900; 1904–1920; 1924; 1928; 1932; 1936; 1948; 1952; 1956; 1960; 1964; 1968; 1972; 1976; 1980; 1984; 1988; 1992; 1996; 2000; 2004; 2008; 2012; 2016; 2020; 2024; 2028

Winter appearances
- 1928; 1932–1980; 1984; 1988; 1992; 1994; 1998; 2002; 2006; 2010; 2014; 2018; 2022; 2026

Mexico first participated at the Olympic Games in 1900 and has sent athletes to compete in every Summer Olympic Games since 1924. Mexico has also participated in several Winter Olympic Games since 1928, though has not yet won any medals in the Winter Olympics.

At the 1932 Summer Olympics, Gustavo Huet made history as the first Mexican medalist, earning silver in the men's 50 metres small-bore rifle prone shooting event. However, at the 1900 Summer Olympics, Mexican athletes won a bronze medal in the polo event, consisting of the three brothers Eustaquio, Manuel and Pablo Escandón. Since an American athlete, Guillermo Hayden Wright, was also part of the team, the International Olympic Committee (IOC) officially attributes this medal to a mixed team and not to Mexico or the United States.

At the 1948 Summer Olympics, Mexico claimed its first Olympic gold medals in equestrian jumping, where both the individual and team titles were decided based on the same competition results.

Mexican athletes have won a total of 77 medals, with diving as the top medal-producing sport.

The National Olympic Committee for Mexico is the Mexican Olympic Committee and was created in 1923. It is currently headed by former Olympic diver María José Alcalá.

== Hosted Games ==
Mexico was the first Latin American nation to host the Olympic Games on one occasion.

Games	Host city	Dates	Nations	Participants	Events
1968 Summer Olympics	Mexico City	12 October - 27 October	112	5,516	172

== Medal tables ==
=== Medals by Summer Games ===
Host country

Games	Athletes	Gold	Silver	Bronze	Total	Rank
(French Third Republic) 1900 Paris	3	0	0	0^{[a]}	0	–
1904–1920	did not participate					
(French Third Republic) 1924 Paris	13	0	0	0	0	–
(Netherlands) 1928 Amsterdam	30	0	0	0	0	–
(United States) 1932 Los Angeles	73	0	2	0	2	21
(Nazi Germany) 1936 Berlin	32	0	0	3	3	28
(United Kingdom) 1948 London	88	2	1	2	5	17
(Finland) 1952 Helsinki	64	0	1	0	1	34
(Australia) 1956 Melbourne	24	1	0	1	2	23
(Italy) 1960 Rome	69	0	0	1	1	41
(Japan) 1964 Tokyo	94	0	0	1	1	35
1968 Mexico City	275	3	3	3	9	15
(West Germany) 1972 Munich	174	0	1	0	1	33
(Canada) 1976 Montreal	97	1	0	1	2	25
(Soviet Union) 1980 Moscow	45	0	1	3	4	29
(United States) 1984 Los Angeles	99	2	3	1	6	17
(South Korea) 1988 Seoul	83	0	0	2	2	44
(Spain) 1992 Barcelona	102	0	1	0	1	49
(United States) 1996 Atlanta	97	0	0	1	1	71
(Australia) 2000 Sydney	78	1	2	3	6	40
(Greece) 2004 Athens	109	0	3	1	4	59
(China) 2008 Beijing	85	2	0	2	4	36
(United Kingdom) 2012 London	102	1	3	4	8	38
(Brazil) 2016 Rio de Janeiro	125	0	3	2	5	61
(Japan) 2020 Tokyo	164	0	0	4	4	84
(France) 2024 Paris	107	0	3	2	5	65
(United States) 2028 Los Angeles	future event					
(Australia) 2032 Brisbane	future event					
Total (25/30)	2,232	13	27	37	77	52

- ^{a} In the polo tournament at the 1900 Summer Olympics, the bronze medal was won by a mixed team composed almost entirely of Mexican players, with the exception of one American athlete Guillermo Hayden Wright. He was part of the mixed polo team, alongside brothers Eustaquio, Manuel and Pablo Escandón. Although the team was predominantly Mexican, the IOC officially attributes this medal to a Mixed Team rather than to Mexico in its records.

=== Medals by Winter Games ===
Games	Athletes	Gold	Silver	Bronze	Total	Rank
(Switzerland) 1928 St. Moritz	5	0	0	0	0	–
1932–1980	did not participate					
(Socialist Federal Republic of Yugoslavia) 1984 Sarajevo	1	0	0	0	0	–
(Canada) 1988 Calgary	11	0	0	0	0	–
(France) 1992 Albertville	20	0	0	0	0	–
(Norway) 1994 Lillehammer	1	0	0	0	0	–
(Japan) 1998 Nagano	did not participate					
(United States) 2002 Salt Lake City	3	0	0	0	0	–
(Italy) 2006 Turin	did not participate					
(Canada) 2010 Vancouver	1	0	0	0	0	–
(Russia) 2014 Sochi	1	0	0	0	0	–
(South Korea) 2018 Pyeongchang	4	0	0	0	0	–
(China) 2022 Beijing	4	0	0	0	0	–
(Italy) 2026 Milano Cortina	5	0	0	0	0	–
(France) 2030 French Alps	future event					
(United States) 2034 Utah	future event					
Total (11/25)	56	0	0	0	0	–

=== Medals by summer sport ===
Sport	Gold	Silver	Bronze	Total
Athletics	3	6	2	11
Boxing	2	4	8	14
Taekwondo	2	2	3	7
Equestrian	2	1	4	7
Diving	1	8	8	17
Weightlifting	1	0	3	4
Football	1	0	1	2
Swimming	1	0	1	2
Archery	0	1	3	4
Cycling	0	1	1	2
Fencing	0	1	0	1
Judo	0	1	0	1
Shooting	0	1	0	1
Wrestling	0	1	0	1
Basketball	0	0	1	1
Modern pentathlon	0	0	1	1
Polo	0	0	1	1
Totals (17 entries)	13	27	37	77

== List of medalists ==
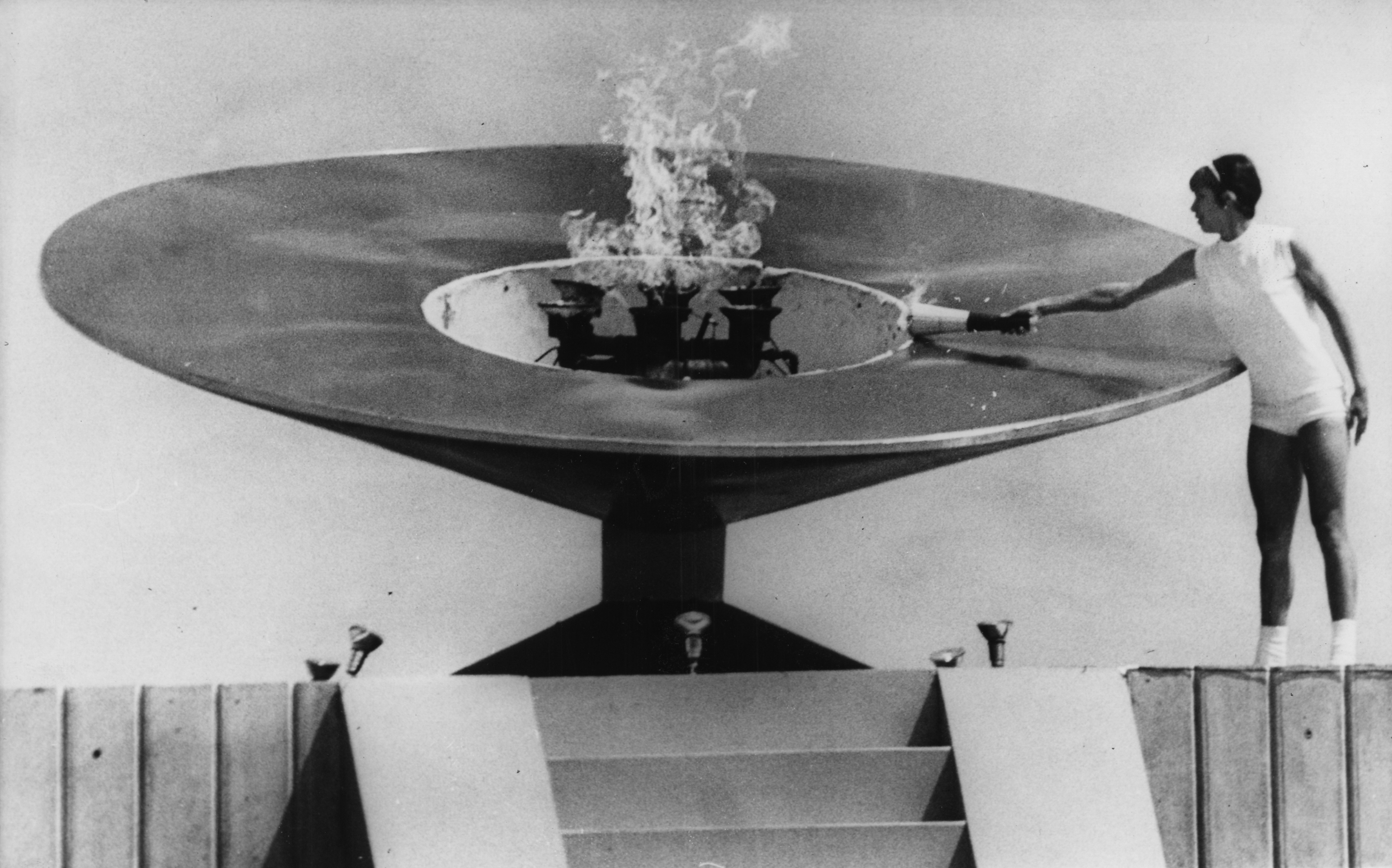
Enriqueta Basilio lighting the cauldron at the 1968 Mexico City Olympics Opening Ceremony, she was the first woman to do so.

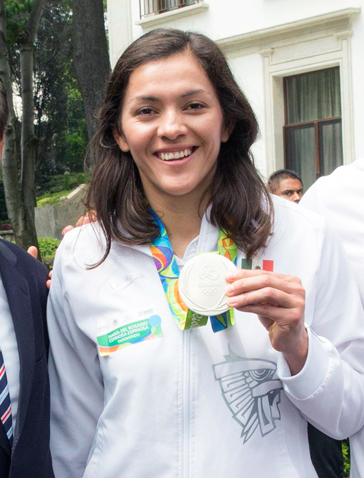
Taekwondo practitioner María Espinoza has won a complete set of medals at the Olympics for Mexico.

=== Summer Olympics ===
List of Mexican medalists
Medal	Name	Games	Sport	Event
Silver	Francisco Cabañas	(United States) 1932 Los Angeles	Boxing	Men's flyweight
Silver	Gustavo Huet	(United States) 1932 Los Angeles	Shooting	Men's 50m rifle prone
Bronze	National team	(Nazi Germany) 1936 Berlin	Basketball	Men's competition
Bronze	Fidel Ortiz	(Nazi Germany) 1936 Berlin	Boxing	Men's bantamweight
Bronze	Juan Gracia; Julio Mueller; Antonio Nava; Alberto Ramos	(Nazi Germany) 1936 Berlin	Polo	Men's competition
Gold	Humberto Mariles (Arete)	(United Kingdom) 1948 London	Equestrian	Jumping Individual
Gold	Rubén Uriza (Hatuey); Humberto Mariles (Arete); Alberto Valdés (Chihuahua)	(United Kingdom) 1948 London	Equestrian	Jumping Team
Silver	Rubén Uriza (Hatuey)	(United Kingdom) 1948 London	Equestrian	Jumping Individual
Bronze	Joaquín Capilla	(United Kingdom) 1948 London	Diving	Men's 10m platform
Bronze	Raúl Campero (Tarahumara); Humberto Mariles (Parral); Joaquín Solano (Malinche)	(United Kingdom) 1948 London	Equestrian	Three-Day Event Team
Silver	Joaquín Capilla	(Finland) 1952 Helsinki	Diving	Men's 10m platform
Gold	Joaquín Capilla	(Australia) 1956 Melbourne	Diving	Men's 10m platform
Bronze	Joaquín Capilla	(Australia) 1956 Melbourne	Diving	Men's 3m springboard
Bronze	Juan Botella	(Italy) 1960 Rome	Diving	Men's 3m springboard
Bronze	Juan Fabila	(Japan) 1964 Tokyo	Boxing	Men's bantamweight
Gold	Antonio Roldán	1968 Mexico City	Boxing	Men's featherweight
Gold	Ricardo Delgado	1968 Mexico City	Boxing	Men's flyweight
Gold	Felipe Muñoz	1968 Mexico City	Swimming	Men's 200m breaststroke
Silver	José Pedraza	1968 Mexico City	Athletics	Men's 20 km Walk
Silver	Álvaro Gaxiola	1968 Mexico City	Diving	Men's 10m platform
Silver	Pilar Roldán	1968 Mexico City	Fencing	Women's Foil
Bronze	Agustín Zaragoza	1968 Mexico City	Boxing	Men's Middleweight
Bronze	Joaquín Rocha	1968 Mexico City	Boxing	Men's Heavyweight
Bronze	María Teresa Ramírez	1968 Mexico City	Swimming	Women's 800m Freestyle
Silver	Alfonso Zamora	(West Germany) 1972 Munich	Boxing	Men's bantamweight
Gold	Daniel Bautista	(Canada) 1976 Montreal	Athletics	Men's 20 km walk
Bronze	Juan Paredes	(Canada) 1976 Montreal	Boxing	Men's featherweight
Silver	Carlos Girón	(Soviet Union) 1980 Moscow	Diving	Men's 3m springboard
Bronze	Joaquín Pérez (Almony)	(Soviet Union) 1980 Moscow	Equestrian	Jumping Individual
Bronze	David Bárcena (Bombón); Manuel Mendivil (Remember); José Luis Pérez (Quelite); Fabián Vázquez (Cocaleco)	(Soviet Union) 1980 Moscow	Equestrian	Three-day Event Team Competition
Bronze	Jesús Gómez (Massacre); Joaquin Pérez (Almony); Gerardo Tazzer (Caribe); Alberto Valdés, Jr. (Lady Mirka)	(Soviet Union) 1980 Moscow	Equestrian	Jumping Team Competition
Gold	Ernesto Canto	(United States) 1984 Los Angeles	Athletics	Men's 20 km walk
Gold	Raúl González	(United States) 1984 Los Angeles	Athletics	Men's 50 km walk
Silver	Raúl González	(United States) 1984 Los Angeles	Athletics	Men's 20 km walk
Silver	Héctor López	(United States) 1984 Los Angeles	Boxing	Men's bantamweight
Silver	Daniel Aceves	(United States) 1984 Los Angeles	Wrestling	Men's flyweight
Bronze	José Youshimatz	(United States) 1984 Los Angeles	Cycling	Men's points race
Bronze	Mario González	(South Korea) 1988 Seoul	Boxing	Men's flyweight
Bronze	Jesús Mena	(South Korea) 1988 Seoul	Diving	Men's 10m platform
Silver	Carlos Mercenario	(Spain) 1992 Barcelona	Athletics	Men's 50 km walk
Bronze	Bernardo Segura	(United States) 1996 Atlanta	Athletics	Men's 20 km walk
Gold	Soraya Jiménez	(Australia) 2000 Sydney	Weightlifting	Women's 58 kg
Silver	Noé Hernández	(Australia) 2000 Sydney	Athletics	Men's 20 km walk
Silver	Fernando Platas	(Australia) 2000 Sydney	Diving	Men's 3m springboard
Bronze	Joel Sánchez	(Australia) 2000 Sydney	Athletics	Men's 50 km walk
Bronze	Cristian Bejarano	(Australia) 2000 Sydney	Boxing	Men's lightweight
Bronze	Víctor Estrada	(Australia) 2000 Sydney	Taekwondo	Men's 68–80 kg
Silver	Ana Guevara	(Greece) 2004 Athens	Athletics	Women's 400m
Silver	Belem Guerrero	(Greece) 2004 Athens	Cycling	Women's points race
Silver	Oscar Salazar	(Greece) 2004 Athens	Taekwondo	Men's -58 kg
Bronze	Iridia Salazar	(Greece) 2004 Athens	Taekwondo	Women's 49–57 kg
Gold	Guillermo Pérez	(China) 2008 Beijing	Taekwondo	Men's -58 kg
Gold	María Espinoza	(China) 2008 Beijing	Taekwondo	Women's +67 kg
Bronze	Paola Espinosa; Tatiana Ortiz	(China) 2008 Beijing	Diving	Women's synchronised 10m platform
Bronze	Damaris Aguirre	(China) 2008 Beijing	Weightlifting	Women's 75 kg
Gold	Mexico national under-23 football team: José de Jesús Corona; Israel Jiménez; Carlos Salcido; Hiram Mier; Dárvin Chávez; Héctor Herrera; Javier Cortés; Marco Fabián; Oribe Peralta; Giovani dos Santos; Javier Aquino; Raúl Jiménez; Diego Reyes; Jorge Enríquez; Néstor Vidrio; Miguel Ponce; Néstor Araujo; José Antonio Rodríguez	(United Kingdom) 2012 London	Football	Men's tournament
Silver	Aída Román	(United Kingdom) 2012 London	Archery	Women's archery
Silver	German Sánchez; Ivan García	(United Kingdom) 2012 London	Diving	Men's synchronised 10m platform
Silver	Paola Espinosa; Alejandra Orozco	(United Kingdom) 2012 London	Diving	Women's synchronised 10m platform
Bronze	Mariana Avitia	(United Kingdom) 2012 London	Archery	Women's archery
Bronze	Laura Sánchez	(United Kingdom) 2012 London	Diving	Women's 3m springboard
Bronze	María Espinoza	(United Kingdom) 2012 London	Taekwondo	Women's +67 kg
Bronze	Luz Acosta	(United Kingdom) 2012 London	Weightlifting	Women's +63 kg
Silver	María Guadalupe González	(Brazil) 2016 Rio de Janeiro	Athletics	Women's 20 km walk
Silver	German Sánchez	(Brazil) 2016 Rio de Janeiro	Diving	Men's 10m platform
Silver	María Espinoza	(Brazil) 2016 Rio de Janeiro	Taekwondo	Women's +67 kg
Bronze	Misael Rodríguez	(Brazil) 2016 Rio de Janeiro	Boxing	Men's middleweight
Bronze	Ismael Hernández	(Brazil) 2016 Rio de Janeiro	Modern pentathlon	Men's
Bronze	Luis Álvarez; Alejandra Valencia	(Japan) 2020 Tokyo	Archery	Mixed Team
Bronze	Gabriela Agúndez; Alejandra Orozco	(Japan) 2020 Tokyo	Diving	Women's synchronised 10m platform
Bronze	Aremi Fuentes	(Japan) 2020 Tokyo	Weightlifting	Women's 75 kg
Bronze	Mexico national under-23 football team: Luis Malagón; Jorge Sánchez; César Montes; Jesús Alberto Angulo; Johan Vásquez; Vladimir Loroña; Luis Romo; Carlos Alberto Rodríguez; Henry Martín; Diego Lainez; Alexis Vega; Adrián Mora; Guillermo Ochoa; Érick Aguirre; Uriel Antuna; José Joaquín Esquivel; Sebastián Córdova; Eduardo Aguirre; Jesús Ricardo Angulo; Fernando Beltrán; Roberto Alvarado; Sebastián Jurado	(Japan) 2020 Tokyo	Football	Men's tournament
Silver	Prisca Awiti Alcaraz	(France) 2024 Paris	Judo	Women's -63 kg
Silver	Osmar Olvera; Juan Celaya	(France) 2024 Paris	Diving	Men's synchronized 3m springboard
Silver	Marco Verde	(France) 2024 Paris	Boxing	Men's welterweight
Bronze	Ángela Ruiz; Alejandra Valencia; Ana Paula Vázquez	(France) 2024 Paris	Archery	Women's Team
Bronze	Osmar Olvera	(France) 2024 Paris	Diving	Men's 3m springboard

=== Multiple Mexican Olympic medalists ===
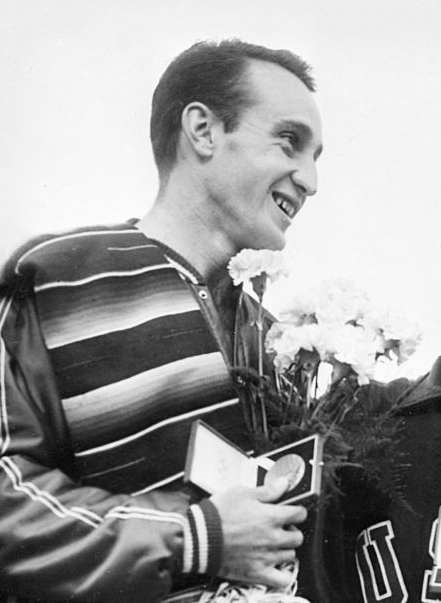
Diver Joaquín Capilla won four olympic medals representing Mexico. The most of any Mexican Olympian.

Joaquín Capilla is the Mexican athlete with the most medals, four, and the first Mexican athlete to obtain medals in three consecutive games, while Humberto Mariles is the only double Olympic champion, also the Mexican athlete with the most medals at a single Olympic games, with three in 1948, and got Mexico's first gold medal.

In 2016, María Espinoza became the first Mexican female athlete to win a medal in three consecutive games.

Rank	Athlete	Sex	Sport	Games	Gold medal	Silver medal	Bronze medal	Total
1	Joaquín Capilla	M	Diving	(Australia) 1956 Melbourne	1	0	1	4
1	Joaquín Capilla	M	Diving	(Finland) 1952 Helsinki	0	1	0	4
1	Joaquín Capilla	M	Diving	(United Kingdom) 1948 London	0	0	1	4
2	Humberto Mariles	M	Equestrian	(United Kingdom) 1948 London	2	0	1	3
3	María Espinoza	F	Taekwondo	(China) 2008 Beijing	1	0	0	3
3	María Espinoza	F	Taekwondo	(Brazil) 2016 Rio de Janeiro	0	1	0	3
3	María Espinoza	F	Taekwondo	(United Kingdom) 2012 London	0	0	1	3
4	Rubén Uriza	M	Equestrian	(United Kingdom) 1948 London	1	1	0	2
4	Raúl González	M	Athletics	(United States) 1984 Los Angeles	1	1	0	2
6	Germán Sánchez	M	Diving	(United Kingdom) 2012 London	0	1	0	2
6	Germán Sánchez	M	Diving	(Brazil) 2016 Rio de Janeiro	0	1	0	2
7	Paola Espinosa	F	Diving	(United Kingdom) 2012 London	0	1	0	2
7	Paola Espinosa	F	Diving	(China) 2008 Beijing	0	0	1	2
7	Alejandra Orozco	F	Diving	(United Kingdom) 2012 London	0	1	0	2
7	Alejandra Orozco	F	Diving	(Japan) 2020 Tokyo	0	0	1	2
7	Osmar Olvera	M	Diving	(France) 2024 Paris	0	1	1	2
10	Joaquín Pérez	M	Equestrian	(Soviet Union) 1980 Moscow	0	0	2	2
10	Alejandra Valencia	F	Archery	(Japan) 2020 Tokyo	0	0	1	2
10	Alejandra Valencia	F	Archery	(France) 2024 Paris	0	0	1	2

== See also ==
- List of flag bearers for Mexico at the Olympics
- Category: Olympic competitors for Mexico
- Mexico at the Paralympics
- Sport in Mexico
