= Argentina at the 1936 Summer Olympics =

- IOC code: ARG
- NOC: Argentine Olympic Committee

in Berlin
- Competitors: 51 (50 men and 1 woman) in 8 sports
- Flag bearer: Juan Carlos Zabala
- Medals Ranked 13th: Gold 2 Silver 2 Bronze 3 Total 7

Summer Olympics appearances (overview)
- 1900; 1904; 1908; 1912; 1920; 1924; 1928; 1932; 1936; 1948; 1952; 1956; 1960; 1964; 1968; 1972; 1976; 1980; 1984; 1988; 1992; 1996; 2000; 2004; 2008; 2012; 2016; 2020; 2024; 2028

Argentina at the 1936 Summer Olympics in Berlin, Germany was the nation's seventh appearance out of ten editions of the Summer Olympic Games. Argentina sent to the 1936 Summer Olympics its fourth national team, under the auspices of the Argentine Olympic Committee (Comité Olímpico Argentino) of 51 athletes (50 men and the first woman), who competed in 31 events in 8 sports. The flag bearer was Juan Carlos Zabala, the gold medalist in the preceding Summer Olympic Games marathon.

== Medalists ==
Medal	Name	Sport	Event
Gold	Oscar Casanovas	Boxing	Men's Featherweight
Gold	Andrés Gazzotti; Manuel Andrada; Roberto Cavanagh; Luis Duggan	Polo	Men's Team Competition
Silver	Guillermo Lovell	Boxing	Men's Heavyweight
Silver	Jeannette Campbell	Swimming	Women's 100m Freestyle
Bronze	Raúl Villarreal	Boxing	Men's Middleweight
Bronze	Francisco Risiglione	Boxing	Men's Light Heavyweight
Bronze	Julio Curatella; Horacio Podestá	Rowing	Men's coxless pair

== Athletics ==
Men
Track & road events

Athlete	Event	Heat		Quarterfinal		Semifinal		Final	
Athlete	Event	Result	Rank	Result	Rank	Result	Rank	Result	Rank
Tomás Beswick	100 m	10.9	3	did not advance					
Tomás Beswick	200 m	22.1	2 Q	NT	6	did not advance			
Juan Carlos Anderson	400 m	49.4	2 Q	48.7	2 Q	48.5	5	did not advance	
Juan Carlos Anderson	800 m	1:55.1	1 Q	—N/a		1:54.8	3 Q	NT	7
Juan Carlos Zabala	10000 m	—N/a						31:22.0	6
Juan Carlos Zabala	Marathon	—N/a						DNF	
Antonio Fondevilla	100 m	11.0	3	did not advance					
Antonio Fondevilla	200 m	NT	6	did not advance					
Carlos Hofmeister	200 m	22.3	3 Q	NT	6	did not advance			
Juan Lavenás	110 m hurdles	15.1	2 Q	—N/a		15.6	6	did not advance	
Juan Lavenás	400 m hurdles	54.5	2 Q	—N/a		54.5	5	did not advance	
Luis Oliva	Marathon	—N/a						DNF	
Antonio Sande	100 m	11.2	4	did not advance					
Antonio Sande; Tomás Beswick; Antonio Fondevilla; Carlos Hofmeister	4 × 100 m relay	41.9	6 Q	—N/a				42.2	4

== Fencing ==
Eleven fencers, all men, represented Argentina in 1936.

Men's foil

- Roberto Larraz
- Ángel Gorordo
- Rodolfo Valenzuela

Men's team foil

- Roberto Larraz
- Héctor Lucchetti
- Ángel Gorordo
- Luis Lucchetti
- Rodolfo Valenzuela
- Manuel Torrente

Men's épée

- Antonio Villamil
- Raúl Saucedo

Men's team épée

- Raúl Saucedo
- Luis Lucchetti
- Antonio Villamil
- Roberto Larraz
- Héctor Lucchetti

Men's sabre

- Vicente Krause
- José Manuel Brunet
- Carmelo Merlo

== Polo ==
=== Men's tournament ===
Roster

Argentina

- Luis Duggan
- Roberto Cavanagh
- Andrés Gazzotti
- Manuel Andrada
- Enrique J. Alberdi
- Diego Cavanagh
- Juan Nelson
- Juan Jose Reynal

First round

5 August

Argentina	15–5	Mexico

Imperial Sports Field, Berlin

Gold medal match

7 August

Argentina	11–0	Great Britain

Imperial Sports Field, Berlin

== Rowing ==
Men

Athlete	Event	Heats		Repechage		Semifinals		Final	
Athlete	Event	Time	Rank	Time	Rank	Time	Rank	Time	Rank
Antonio Giorgio	Single sculls	7:33.00	3 R	7:38.70	1 Q	8:18.40	3 Q	8:57.50	6
Horacio Podestá; Julio Curatella	Coxless pair	7:20.00	2 q	BYE		9:11.40	1 Q	8:23.00	Bronze medal

== Sailing ==
Open

Athlete	Event	Race														Final rank	
Athlete	Event	1		2		3		4		5		6		7		Final rank	
Athlete	Event	Score	Rank	Score	Rank	Score	Rank	Score	Rank	Score	Rank	Score	Rank	Score	Rank	Score	Rank
Julio Sieburger; Claudio Bincaz; Germán Frers; Edelf Hosmann; Jorge Linck	6 Metre	5	8	8	5	2	11	8	5	4	9	5	8	7	6	52	4
Rufino Rodríguez de la Torre; Mario Ortiz Sauze; Luis Domingo Aguirre; Hipolito Ezequiel Gil Elizalde; Rafael Ernesto Iglesias; Guillermo Peralta Ramos	8 Metre	8	3	7	4	7	4	9	2	8	3	6	5	7	4	25	7

== Shooting ==
Five shooters represented Argentina in 1936.

Men

Athlete	Event	Round 1	Round 2	Round 3	Round 4	Shoot off	Final	
Athlete	Event	Score	Score	Score	Score	Score	Score	Rank
Lorenzo Amaya	25 m rapid fire pistol	18	1	did not advance			19	28
Carlos Balestrini	25 m rapid fire pistol	18	5	did not advance			23	19
Guillermo Canciani	50 metre rifle prone	—N/a					288	44
Miguel Lonegro	50 m pistol	—N/a					513	27
Juan Rostagno	50 m pistol	—N/a					519	18

== Swimming ==
Women

Athlete	Event	Heat		Semifinal		Final	
Athlete	Event	Time	Rank	Time	Rank	Time	Rank
Jeannette Campbell	100 metre freestyle	1:06.8	1 Q	1:06.6	1 Q	1:06.4	Silver medal
