= Mexico at the 1900 Summer Olympics =

- IOC code: MEX

in Paris, France
- Competitors: 3 in 1 sport
- Medals: Gold 0 Silver 0 Bronze 0 Total 0

Summer Olympics appearances (overview)
- 1900; 1904–1920; 1924; 1928; 1932; 1936; 1948; 1952; 1956; 1960; 1964; 1968; 1972; 1976; 1980; 1984; 1988; 1992; 1996; 2000; 2004; 2008; 2012; 2016; 2020; 2024; 2028

Mexico competed at the modern Olympic Games for the first time at the 1900 Summer Olympics in Paris, France.

== Medalists ==
Medals awarded to participants of mixed-NOC teams are represented in italics. These medals are not counted towards the individual NOC medal tally.

Medal	Name	Sport	Event	Date
Bronze	Eustaquio Escandón; Manuel de Escandón; Pablo de Escandón	Polo	Men's tournament	31 May

== Results by event ==
=== Polo ===
Mexico was one of four nations to compete in the first Olympic polo event. The Mexican foursome tied for third place despite losing their only match.

Team	Event	Quarterfinals	Semifinals	Final	
Team	Event	Opposition Score	Opposition Score	Opposition Score	Rank
A north american team (ZZX); Eustaquio Escandón (MEX); Manuel de Escandón (MEX); Pablo de Escandón (MEX); Guillermo Hayden Wright (USA)	Men's	Bye	BLO Polo Club Rugby (ZZX); L 8-0	Did not advance	3rd place, bronze medalist(s)
