= Freake (surname) =

Freake is a surname. Notable people with the surname include:

- Charles Freake, English architect and builder
- Edmund Freke (also spelled Freake or Freak; c. 1516–1591), English dean and bishop
- Frederick Freake (1876–1950), British polo player

== See also ==
- Freake baronets
- Freake Painter, anonymous 17th-century American artist
