= Jonny Dodge =

British entrepreneur (born 1982)

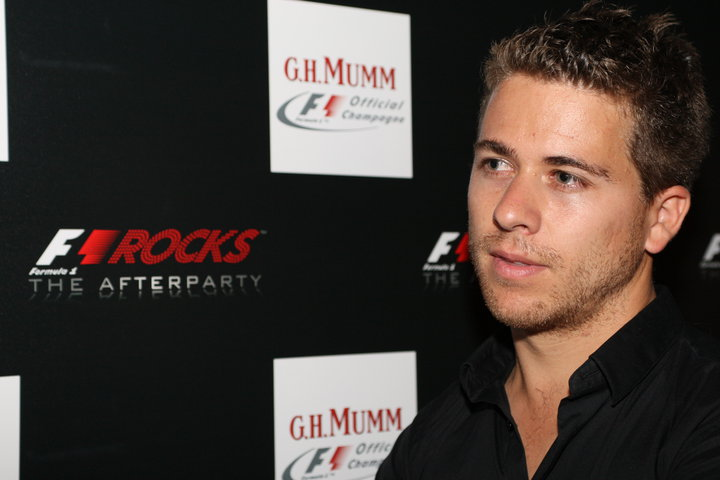
Jonny Dodge F1Rocks.

Jonny Dodge (born 30 June 1982) is a British F1, events, aviation & superyacht entrepreneur and founder of the Dodgeball Rally. He has been called the 'Superyacht Influencer' in Forbes Magazine.

== Early life and education ==
Dodge was born in Dorset, and grew up in Wincanton, England. His father was also in the yachting industry. Dodge gained a first class Hons Degree in Product Design at The University of Plymouth, followed by a master's degree at Central St. Martins College of Art and Design in London in 2007.

== Early career ==
After graduation Dodge went on to organise a boat rally called The BladeRun. He went on to work on the Gumball 3000, and then invested in the Mayfair based nightclub Aura Mayfair with his business partner Tony Fernandes. In January 2011, Madonna held talk on investing in the club after her numerous visits and meetings with owners.

Dodgeball Rally started in 2009 and is a bi-annual supercar rally in several European countries. Dodge also founded Concours d'Elegance at the Hurlingham Club, and hosted parties with celebrities such as Jimmy Choo

Dodge's F1 career started in 2010 when he put on Grand Prix Ball at Hurlingham Club prior to the British Grand Prix at Silverstone, his company GP Management also ran F1 Rocks parties in several countries, with artists such as Eminem, Jessie J, and Jay Kay.

== Charity work ==
Dodge is a philanthropist and support of The Prince's Trust through his gala dinner in London the Grand Prix Ball

== Other activities ==
He has been an astronaut in training with Zero Gravity Corporation, and is signed up for Virgin Galactic promoting his business for holidays in Space
