= Jack Gannon =

Irish cricketer and British Army officer (1882–1980)

Personal information
- Full name: Jack Rose Compton Gannon
- Born: 1 November 1882; Ireland
- Died: 25 April 1980 (aged 97); Midhurst, Sussex, England
- Batting: Unknown
- Role: Wicket-keeper
- Relatives: George Robertson (father-in-law)

Domestic team information
- Years: Team
- 1908–1910: Marylebone Cricket Club
- 1917/18: Europeans (India)

Career statistics
Competition	First-class
Matches	8
Runs scored	158
Batting average	13.16
100s/50s	–/–
Top score	48
Catches/stumpings	10/3
- Source: ESPNcricinfo, 20 December 2018

Brigadier Jack Rose Compton Gannon CBE, MVO (1 November 1882 – 25 April 1980) was an Irish first-class cricketer and British Army officer. He served initially with the British Army's South Staffordshire Regiment before joining the Indian Army's 23rd Cavalry (Frontier Force). He saw active service in the First World War and the Third Anglo-Afghan War and was mentioned in dispatches. Gannon later served as assistant military secretary to the British commander-in-chief in India before his retirement in 1933. He was recalled to service in the Second World War and was recognised for his contributions to the war on the western front by two further mentions in dispatches and appointment to British and Dutch honours. In retirement he was manager of The Hurlingham Club – an exclusive sports club – and honorary secretary of the Hurlingham Polo Association. Gannon played eight first-class cricket matches for Marylebone Cricket Club and the Europeans.

== Early life and education ==
The son of John Gannon, Jack Rose Compton Gannon was born in Ireland in November 1882.

He was educated in England at Sutton Valence School, before attending the Royal Military College, Sandhurst as a gentleman cadet.

== Career ==
Upon graduating from Sandhurst, Gannon was commissioned as a second lieutenant in October 1902 with the South Staffordshire Regiment. He was seconded to serve with the 23rd Cavalry (Frontier Force) in British India in 1906, where he gained the rank of lieutenant in January 1906, backdated to January 1905. He formally transferred to the Indian Army in October 1906.

Gannon was present in England in 1908, when he made three appearances in first-class cricket for the Marylebone Cricket Club (MCC) at Lord's against Oxford University, Leicestershire and the Gentlemen of Philadelphia. He played three more first-class matches for the MCC in 1910, as well as appearing in that same year for the Gentlemen of England at Oxford against Oxford University. He married Dorothy Mary Robertson in 1910, the daughter of the first-class cricketer George Robertson. Gannon was promoted to the rank of captain in October 1911.

=== First World War ===
Present in England at the outbreak of the war, Gannon served initially attached to the British Army's 4th Hussars, who had made a request for available cavalry officers. He was posted to the Royal Flying Corps later and was appointed an adjutant on 27 September 1916. He was promoted to the rank of major in October 1917. By June 1918 he was back in India holding the appointment of temporary commandant, Muttra Remount Depot. Whilst serving in British India Gannon appeared in a first-class cricket match for the Europeans against the Parsees at Bombay, which was to be his final appearance in first-class cricket. In his eight-match first-class cricket career he scored 158 runs, with a highest score of 48.

Shortly after the end of the First World War, he served in the Third Anglo-Afghan War as a temporary Lieutenant-Colonel and assistant director of Remounts India from 12 June to 15 September 1919. He was mentioned in dispatches by General Sir Charles Monro in connection to this campaign. Gannon served under Monro again as assistant director of Remounts, Waziristan Force (sourcing replacement horses for the cavalry in the field) from 3 October 1919 to 31 May 1920 and held the temporary rank of lieutenant-colonel during this time and was again mentioned in dispatches. Gannon served as assistant military secretary to the army's commander in chief in India (Lord Rawlinson) from 1920 to 1925. For his service in this role and in connection with the Prince of Wales's visit to India he was recognised with appointment as Member of the fourth class (now called a lieutenant) of the Royal Victorian Order on 11 March 1922. He was appointed a brevet lieutenant colonel in July 1925 and was later promoted to the full rank in October 1928. He was the commanding officer of 12th Cavalry (Frontier Force) from 1927 to 1932. Gannon was placed on the Indian Army's unemployed list of officers on 1 November 1932 and retired on 7 September 1933 with the rank of lieutenant-colonel.

=== Second World War ===
Despite having reached the age limit for reserve officers on 1 November 1937 Gannon was recalled to active service and granted the temporary rank of colonel during the Second World War. He served as assistant military secretary of the British Home Forces from the outbreak of the war. As a cavalryman, sportsman and Indian Army officer it was considered that he was lucky to have kept his job after the rise of General Bernard Montgomery – who held such men in disdain. In July 1943 he was appointed deputy military secretary for the 21st Army Group. Gannon was particularly valued for his knowledge of the personalities and capabilities of the officers in this command and his advice was sought on candidates to fill any vacant positions. He was described as indispensable to Montgomery in this regard, though the general teased him about his cavalry background and sporting priorities. By 1944 at the age of 62 and five years older than Montgomery, he was probably the oldest officer still on his staff.

== Recognition and honours ==
Gannon was appointed an Officer of the Order of the British Empire (OBE) on 11 June 1942 as part of 1942 Birthday Honours. Gannon was promoted to be a Commander of the Order of the British Empire on 1 February 1945 for services in Europe following the Invasion of Normandy. He was mentioned in dispatches on 9 August 1945 and again on 4 April 1946 for further service during the North West Europe campaign. He was appointed to the acting rank of brigadier and received the appointment of Knight Commander of the Order of Orange Nassau with Swords from the Dutch queen in 1946.

== Other activities ==
Gannon was a keen polo player, achieving a handicap of seven, and being on the winning teams in the Inter-Regimental Tournament in India in 1924 and 1925. He was active in the administration of the sport, serving as honorary secretary of the British governing body – the Hurlingham Polo Association – from 1934 until his death. He was also manager and secretary of The Hurlingham Club and president of the National Pony Society. He was described as instrumental in organising the polo events at the 1936 Olympic Games. He wrote entries on the sport in the Encyclopaedia Britannica and published his military and sporting memoirs in 1976 entitled Before the Colors Fade.

In addition to polo and cricket Gannon was also a keen pigsticker and shooter and was a member of the Cavalry Club. During his time in India he had been master of both the Quetta and Lahore hunts.

== Death ==
Gannon died on 25 April 1980 at the King Edward VII Hospital near Midhurst in Sussex.
