= Frederick Freake =

British polo player

Olympic medal record

Men's polo

Representing United Kingdom
Silver medal – second place	1900 Paris	Team competition
Silver medal – second place	1908 London	Team competition

Freake circa 1912-1914

Sir Frederick Charles Maitland Freake, 3rd Baronet (7 March 1876 – 22 December 1950) was a British polo player in the 1900 Summer Olympics and in the 1908 Summer Olympics.

== Biography ==
He was born on 7 March 1876 and was educated at Magdalene College, Cambridge. In 1900 he was part of the BLO Polo Club Rugby polo team which won the silver medal.

Eight years later as a member of the Hurlingham Club he won the silver medal again.

In 1920 he succeeded to the Baronetcy of Cromwell House and Fulwell Park. He served as president of Fulwell Golf Club from 1931 to 1938.

He lived at the Old Manor House, Halford, Warwickshire and served as High Sheriff of Warwickshire in 1939. He died on 22 December 1950.

== Family ==
Freake married, at St. Peter's, Cranley Gardens, on 7 July 1902, Alison Ussher, daughter of Christopher Ussher, of Eastwell, County Galway.

Baronetage of the United Kingdom
Preceded by Thomas Freake	Baronet (of Cromwell House and Fulwell Park); 1920–1950	Succeeded by Charles Freake
