= William Cushion =

Air vice-marshal Sir William Cushion KBE CB
- Born: 30 January 1891; Lakenham, Norwich
- Died: 16 January 1978 (aged 86); Fulham, London
- Military career
- Allegiance: United Kingdom
- Branch: British Army (1914–1918); Royal Air Force (1918–1947)
- Service years: 1914–1947
- Rank: Air vice-marshal
- Commands: No. 40 Group (1940–1942); No. 4 Stores Depot (1935–1938)
- Conflicts: First World War; Second World War
- Awards: Knight Commander of the Order of the British Empire; Companion of the Order of the Bath
- Other work: Executive with BOAC

Air vice-marshal Sir William Boston Cushion, KBE, CB (30 January 1891 – 16 January 1978) was a British Army and Royal Air Force officer and an executive of the British Overseas Airways Corporation.

== Early life ==
The son of William Cushion, of Surlingham, near Norwich, Cushion was educated at Gresham's School, Holt, where he was a member of the school's Officer Training Corps, and at Faraday House, London.

== Career ==
Originally he studied electrical engineering but at the start of the First World War Cushion was commissioned as a second lieutenant into the 22nd Battalion the Manchester Regiment on 3 December 1914 and attached to the Royal Flying Corps in 1915. During the First World War he served in France from 1915 to 1918. After the war, in 1919, he received a permanent commission into the Royal Air Force, serving as a flight lieutenant from 1919 to 1921, and was promoted squadron leader on 1 January 1922. He served in India from 1922 until 1927, was appointed an Officer of the Order of the British Empire that year and was promoted wing commander on 1 January 1929. He served in Iraq (then a British protectorate) from 1933 to 1935, was promoted group captain in 1937, air commodore in 1940, and air vice marshal in 1942, serving as Director-General of Equipment at the Air Ministry. He was advanced to Commander of the Order of the British Empire in 1942, appointed a Companion of the Order of the Bath in 1944 and knighted as a Knight Commander of the Order of the British Empire in 1947.

After retirement from the Royal Air Force, Cushion was an executive of the British Overseas Airways Corporation from 1946, taking charge of General Services from 1948. He represented BOAC on the Aircraft Requirements and Contracts Committee, which considered aircraft replacement jointly with British European Airways and British South American Airways. He retired from BOAC on 30 September 1956, after an announcement in May: "The Corporation desires to place on record its great appreciation of the notable contributions of Sir Victor Tait, Sir Harold Whittingham, and Sir William Cushion to the progress and development of B. O. A. C."

== Private life ==
In 1917, Cushion married Esther Jane Kenyon-Spooner, and they had two daughters. He was a member of the Hurlingham Club and at the time of his death was living in London SW6.
