= John Paul McCann =

Irish polo player

Olympic medal record

Men's Polo
Silver medal – second place	1908 London	Team competition

John Paul McCann (25 August 1879 – 24 August 1952) was an Irish polo player who competed at the 1908 Summer Olympics. Together with Percy O'Reilly, John Hardress Lloyd and Auston Rotheram, he was a member of the Ireland team that won a silver medal The Ireland team was part of the Great Britain Olympic team.
