= Tivadar Dienes-Öhm =

Hungarian equestrian (1907–1944)

Personal information
- Nationality: Hungarian
- Born: 20 October 1907 Nyaregyhaza, Austria-Hungarian Empire
- Died: 28 October 1944 (aged 37) Kiskunfélegyháza, Hungary

Sport
- Sport: Polo

Tivadar Dienes-Öhm (20 October 1907 – 28 October 1944) was a Hungarian equestrian soldier born at Nyaregyhaza, Austria-Hungarian Empire. He competed in the men's polo event at the 1936 Summer Olympics. He was killed in action during the Second World War.
