= William Robertson (Australian settler) =

Australian pastoralist

William Robertson (7 October 1798 – 18 January 1874) was an Australian pastoralist.

Born in Scotland and emigrating to Van Diemen's Land (now Tasmania) he rose to prominence by becoming a member of the Port Phillip Association which led to the first European settlement of Victoria. He also explored the Western District of Victoria in the company of Joseph Gellibrand and William Buckley.

In 1834 he married Margaret Whyte of Berwick, Scotland, and they had four sons and three daughters. Robertson died on 18 January 1874, predeceased by his wife and a daughter; his extensive Colac property was divided equally between his sons, John (1837–1875), William (1839–1892), George Pringle (1842–1895) and James (1848–1890).

Robertson is listed at 141 in the All-Time Australian Rich List with a wealth of $1.83 billion (estimated 2004 value).
