= Humphrey Patrick Guinness =

British polo player (1902–1986)

Olympic medal record

Men's polo
Silver medal – second place	1936 Berlin	Team competition

Humphrey Patrick Guinness (24 March 1902 – 10 February 1986) was a British polo player who competed in the 1936 Summer Olympics.

== Biography ==
Guinness was born in Haslemere on 24 March 1902, and was educated at Eton College and the Royal Military College, Sandhurst. His father Lt-Col Eustace Guinness DSO died at Bakenlaagte in the Second Boer War. His mother was Isabel, daughter of Charles Bell, J.P., of Woolsington Hall, Northumberland, England. His great-grandfather Robert Rundell Guinness (1789-1857) founded the Guinness Mahon bank in 1836.

Guinness participated in the 1930 and 1936 International Polo Cup. He became part of the British polo team, which won the silver medal in 1936. He played both matches in the tournament, the first against Mexico and the final against Argentina.

During World War II he served as a colonel in the Royal Scots Greys. In 1946 he married Gladys, daughter of Major William Edward Gatacre.

Guinness died on 10 February 1986 in Trowbridge, at the age of 83.
