= George Arthur Miller =

British polo player (1867–1935)

Olympic medal record

Men's Polo
Gold medal – first place	1908 London	Team competition

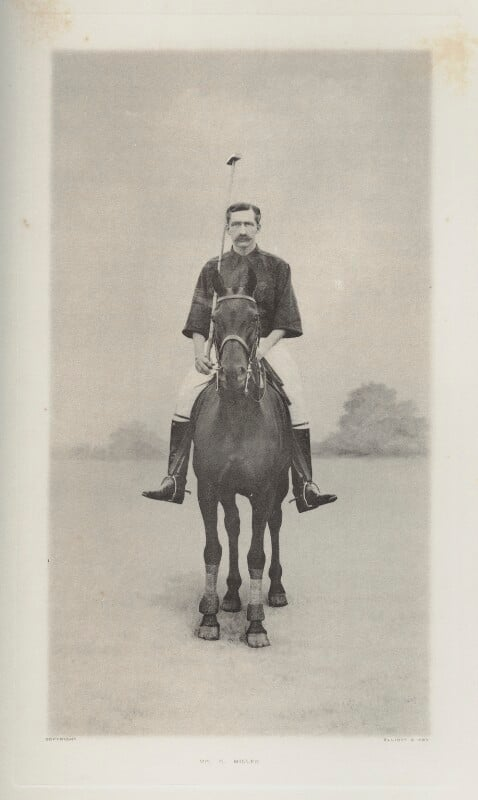
Miller c. 1910

George Arthur Miller (6 December 1867 – 21 February 1935), was a British polo player who competed in the 1908 Summer Olympics as a member of the British polo team Roehampton, which won the gold medal.

Miller was educated at Marlborough College and Trinity College, Cambridge.
