= Church of St Yeghiche, South Kensington =

Church in London, England

Coordinates: 51.489394°N 0.177845°W

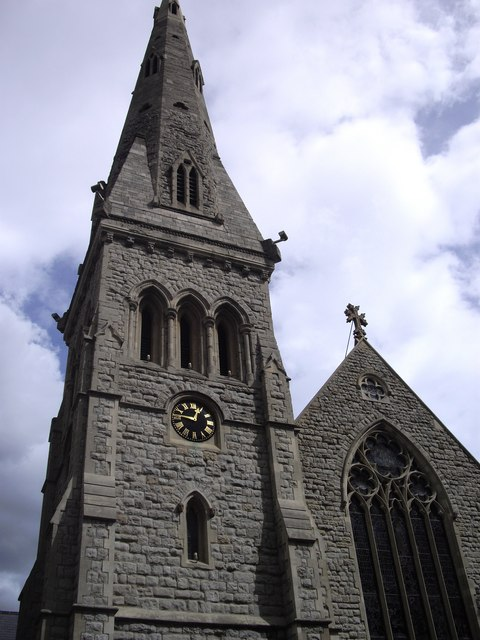
St Yeghiche's Armenian Church

St Yeghiche Armenian Church (Armenian: Սուրբ Եղիշե եկեղեցի) is the largest church of the Armenian Apostolic Church in Great Britain. It faces Cranley Gardens, South Kensington, London. The church was privately built in 1867 as St Peter's Anglican Church by highly successful developer, Charles James Freake, whose widow came to live later in life in one of the adjacent houses. It became the Church of England parish church of Kensington (St Peter's).

By an Order in Council of December 1972 Saint Peter's was declared redundant with the intention that the building be leased to the Armenian Apostolic Church. Anglican services ceased in January 1973.

The building was purchased by a benefactor in 1998 and restored, with the addition of features required by the Armenian Divine Liturgy. Another Armenian church in Kensington, of the traditional Armenian style, is St Sarkis.
