= Kálmán Bartalis =

Hungarian polo player

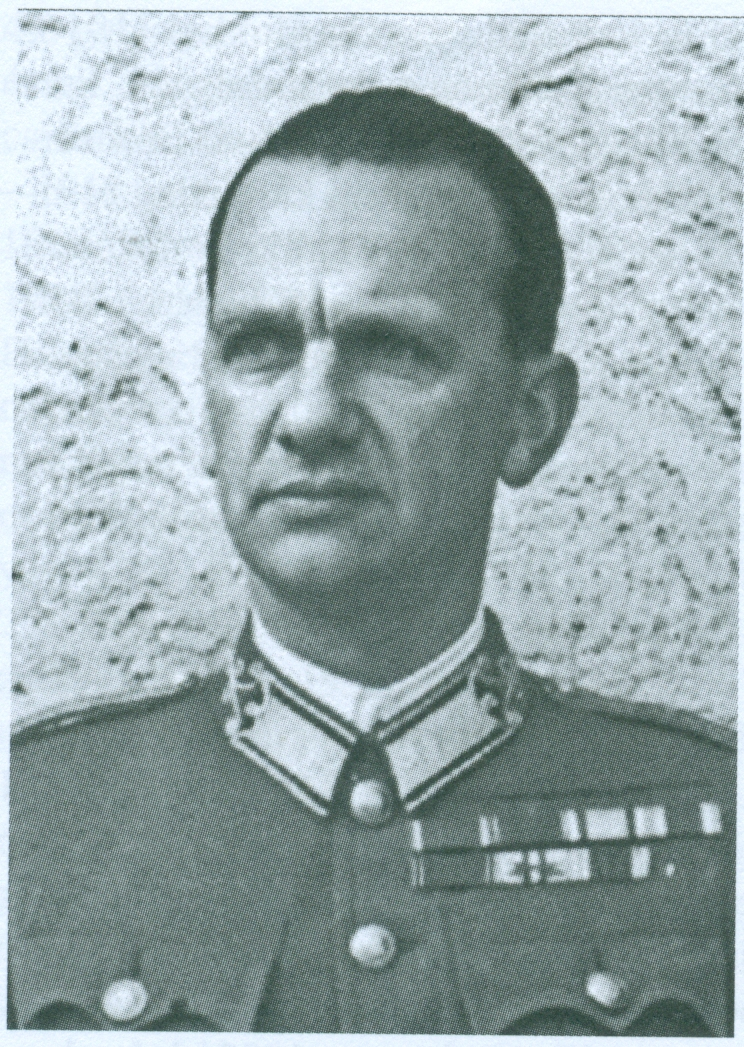
Kálmán Bartalis

Kálmán Bartalis (May 16, 1899 – March 21, 1982) was a Hungarian polo player who competed in the 1936 Summer Olympics. Born in Szamosújvár, he was part of the Hungarian polo team, which finished fourth. He played one match in the 1936 tournament.
