= Percy O'Reilly =

Irish polo player

Olympic medal record

Men's Polo
Silver medal – second place	1908 London	Team competition

Captain Percy Philip O'Reilly (27 July 1870 – 3 July 1942) of Colamber Westmeath was an Irish polo player who competed at the 1908 Summer Olympics. Together with John Paul McCann, John Hardress Lloyd and Auston Rotheram, he was a member of the Ireland team that won a silver medal. The Ireland team was part of the Great Britain Olympic team. In 1911 he was an 8-goal handicap player. He was the only son of Philip O'Reilly and Anna Maria Nugent, the daughter of Sir Percy Nugent.

Captain Percy O'Reilly married Alice Eleanor Boyd-Rochfort of Middleton Park on 18 January 1900, she was the sister of Captain Sir Cecil Boyd-Rochfort royal horse trainer and daughter of Major Rochfort Hamilton Boyd-Rochfort.

He was made High Sheriff of Westmeath in 1919.

Captain Percy O'Reilly and Alice Eleanor Boyd-Rochfort had three sons and three daughters. Born in 1909 their son Captain Charles Valentine O'Reilly was awarded a Military Cross for his courage and determination in an action whilst crossing the Wietze river in the village of Reiningen in April 1945. Their youngest daughter Viola born in 1907, married General Sir Miles Dempsey, commander of the British Second Army during the D-Day landings and invasion of Normandy.
