= Clément Van Der Straeten =

Belgian polo player

Personal information
- Nationality: German
- Born: 1 September 1889
- Died: 28 January 1953 (aged 63)

Sport
- Country: England, Argentina, Belgium
- Sport: Polo

Clément Van Der Straeten (1 September 1889 – 28 January 1953) was a Belgian polo player. He competed in the polo tournament at the 1920 Summer Olympics.
