= Bryan Fowler =

British polo player (1898–1987)

Olympic medal record

Men's polo
Silver medal – second place	1936 Berlin	Team competition

Bryan John Fowler (18 August 1898 – 4 December 1987) was an Irish polo player who competed for Great Britain in the 1936 Summer Olympics.

== Biography ==
Fowler was born in Kells, Ireland. He was part of the British polo team, which won the silver medal. He played both matches in the tournament, the first against Mexico and the final against Argentina. Fowler's son, John, was a jockey and racehorse trainer, and his daughter, Jessica Harrington, is also a racehorse trainer herself.

Fowler died in Enfield, Ireland in 1987, at the age of 89.
