= Gaston Peers de Nieuwburgh =

Belgian polo player

Personal information
- Born: 28 December 1867; Brussels, Belgium
- Died: 28 August 1922 (aged 54); Liège, Belgium

Sport
- Sport: Polo

Gaston Peers de Nieuwburgh (28 December 1867 – 28 August 1922) was a Belgian polo player. He competed in the polo tournament at the 1920 Summer Olympics.
