= Dodgeball Rally =

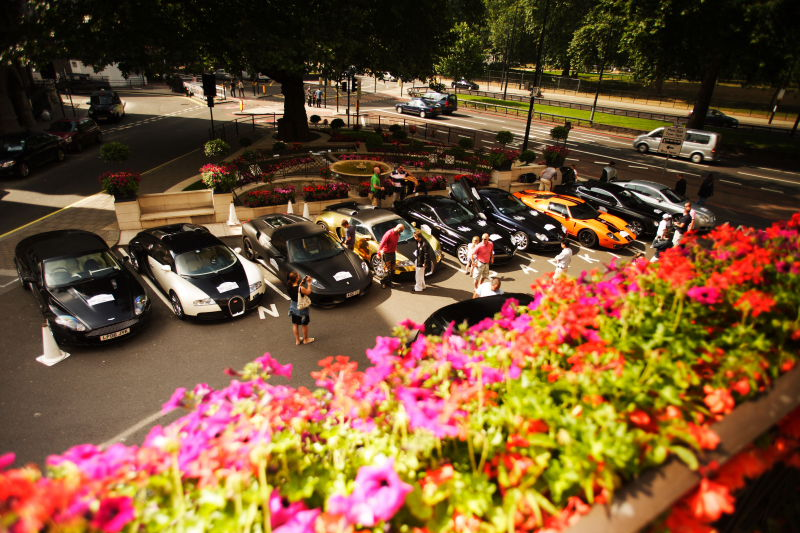
Before the start of the Dodgeball Rally at the Dorchester on Park Lane, 28 June 2009

Dodgeball Rally is a bi-annual supercar rally held around Europe. It takes place on public roads, with different routes through Europe. There is also a Winter event held finishing in Verbier. Initially started by Jonny Dodge in 2009. The event is famed for showcasing the worlds rarest cars, such as Gold Bugatti Veyron, Chrome McLaren SLR, and several of the cars being banned from driving through France. The event had started from Many London hotels off Park Lane, including The Dorchester, Hilton Park Lane, and Intercon Park Lane.

2012 – Dodgeball has formed a partnership with SRO Group Who run the Blancpain Endurance Series to organise the rallies to finish at some of their races, such as the Paul Ricard Circuit on June 30.
