= Robert Hinde (British Army officer) =

British Army general and polo player (1900–1981)

Major-General Sir Robert Hinde KBE CB DSO**
- Born: 25 June 1900; Cupar, Fife, Scotland
- Died: 13 July 1981 (aged 81); Salisbury, Wiltshire, England
- Spouse: Evelyn Muriel Wright
- Military career
- Allegiance: United Kingdom
- Branch: British Army
- Service years: 1919–1958
- Rank: Major-General
- Nickname: "Looney"
- Service number: 10830
- Units: 15th Hussars; 15th/19th Hussars
- Commands: 22nd Armoured Brigade (1943–1944); 20th Armoured Brigade (1942); 15th/19th Hussars (1940–1942)
- Conflicts: Second World War; Mau Mau Uprising
- Awards: Knight Commander of the Order of the British Empire; Companion of the Order of the Bath; Distinguished Service Order & Two Bars

Major-General Sir William Robert Norris "Looney" Hinde, KBE, CB, DSO & Two Bars (25 June 1900 – 13 July 1981) was a senior British Army officer who served in the Second World War and in the Mau Mau Uprising in colonial Kenya.

== Biography ==
Hinde was born in Cupar, Fife, and was educated at Wellington College, before training as a "Gentlemen Cadet" at the Royal Military College, Sandhurst. He was commissioned as a second lieutenant in the 15th Hussars on 16 July 1919, and promoted to lieutenant in the combined 15th/19th Hussars on 16 July 1921.

Hinde was a keen polo player and was selected as a member of the British polo team to compete in the 1936 Summer Olympics, winning a silver medal. He played both matches in the tournament, the first against Mexico and the final against Argentina.

He was promoted to captain, and then on 10 January 1938 to major. From 1940 to 1942 he served as commander of the 15th/19th Hussars, receiving promotion to lieutenant colonel on 10 January 1941.

From 26 August 1942 until 7 December 1942 he commanded the 20th Armoured Brigade, with the temporary rank of brigadier, and then from 23 January 1943 to 7 August 1944 was commander of the 22nd Armoured Brigade, seeing active service in North Africa, Italy and North-West Europe; particularly in Normandy and in the Battle of Villers-Bocage. On 27 May 1944 he was promoted to the substantive rank of colonel, with seniority from 10 January.

From 1945 to 1948 he was Deputy Military Governor of the British Sector of Berlin. He was promoted to brigadier on 12 October 1948, and from October 1948 to July 1949 was deputy commander of the North-West District. He returned to Germany to serve as deputy commanding officer, Lower Saxony, from 1949 to 1951. Hinde was appointed an aide-de-camp to the king on 24 November 1950. From 1952 to 1953 he served as district officer commanding Cyrenaica District, North Africa.

In January 1953, Hinde was appointed director of operations, Kenya, with the temporary rank of major-general, to lead an offensive against the Mau Mau rebels. He relinquished his appointment on 31 March 1956, and his temporary rank on 18 June 1956.

On 1 January 1957 Hinde was appointed colonel of the 15/19th Hussars. On 11 April 1957 he retired from active duty, with the honorary rank of major-general, and serving in the Army Reserve of Officers until reaching mandatory retirement age on 25 June 1958. He continued to serve as colonel of the 15th/19th Hussars until 1 January 1964.

== Awards and decorations ==
Olympic medal record

Men's polo
Silver medal – second place	1936 Berlin	Team competition

- Distinguished Service Order and two bars

On 22 July 1943 he was awarded the Distinguished Service Order "in recognition of gallant and distinguished services in the Middle East", and on 19 August 1943 received a Bar to his DSO. On 14 February 1946 "in recognition of gallant and distinguished services in the field" he received a second Bar.

- Knight Commander of the Order of the British Empire

In the King's Birthday Honours of 10 June 1948, Hinde was appointed a Commander of the Order of the British Empire (CBE), and in the Queen's Birthday Honours of 31 May 1956, he was made a Knight Commander of the Order of the British Empire (KBE).

- Companion of the Order of the Bath

On 19 July 1955 he was appointed a Companion of the Bath (CB) "in recognition of distinguished service in Kenya during the period 21st October 1954, to 20th April 1955".

- Mention in despatches

On 1 January 1955 he received a mention in despatches "in recognition of distinguished services in Kenya during the period 21st April to 20th October 1954."

== Personal life ==
He married Evelyn Muriel Wright, daughter of Captain Henry FitzHerbert Wright and Muriel Harriet Fletcher on 22 July 1926. The couple had one son, William (Bill), and three daughters, Elizabeth, Cathryn and Victoria. Hinde's nickname "Looney" was a tribute to both his courage and eccentricity; on one occasion while briefing his senior officers in Normandy in mid-June 1944 he was distracted by a rare caterpillar, which he promptly collected. In May 1947 he was detained by a Russian patrol while wandering along the border of the British and Soviet sectors of Berlin with a pair of binoculars. After explaining that he was simply birdwatching he was released with an apology. Hinde died on 13 July 1981, aged 81, at Salisbury, Wiltshire.
