= Imre Szentpály =

Hungarian polo player

Imre Szentpály (November 15, 1904 – January 24, 1987) was a Hungarian polo player who competed in the 1936 Summer Olympics.

He was born in Nagyvárad.

He was part of the Hungarian polo team, which finished fourth. He played all three matches in the 1936 tournament.

He died in Budapest.
