= John Hardress Lloyd =

Irish soldier and polo player

Brigadier-General John Hardress Lloyd DSO
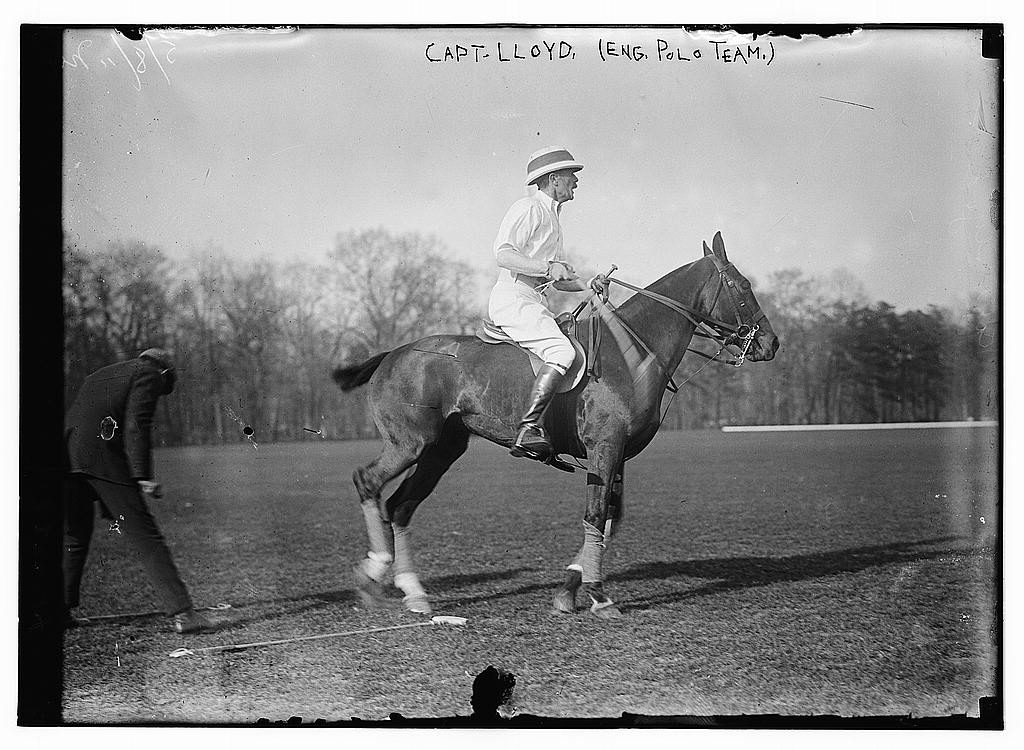
- Hardress-Lloyd in the United States, 1911
- Born: 14 August 1874
- Died: 28 February 1952 (aged 77)
- Relatives: John Lloyd (writer) (great nephew)
- Military career
- Allegiance: United Kingdom
- Branch: British Army → 4th Royal Irish Dragoon Guards → 21st Lancers → Royal Inniskilling Fusiliers → Heavy Branch Machine Gun Corps
- Rank: Brigadier-General
- Commands: 3rd Tank Brigade
- Conflicts: Tirah Campaign; Second Boer War; First World War → Western Front → Gallipoli → Battle of Arras
- Awards: DSO (January 1917): Bar (July 1918); French Légion d’Honneur

Brigadier-General John Hardress Lloyd DSO (14 August 1874 – 28 February 1952) was an Anglo-Irish officer in the British Army and polo player. He was awarded a DSO and made a Chevalier of the Légion d’Honneur for his service during the First World War. As a polo player, he won a silver medal with the Ireland team at the 1908 Summer Olympics.

== Biography ==
Hardress Lloyd was born into an Anglo-Irish family with connections to County Offaly. He was the son of John Lloyd, a lawyer, and Susanna Frances Julia Colclough. He was the second of their seven children and their oldest son. On 5 August 1903, he married Adeline Wilson. They did not have any children. Hardress-Lloyd is the great-uncle of John Lloyd, the TV producer behind the Blackadder series.

== Polo player ==
As a polo player, Hardress Lloyd, together with John Paul McCann, Percy O'Reilly and Auston Rotheram, was a member of the Ireland team that won a silver medal at the 1908 Summer Olympics. The Ireland team was part of the Great Britain Olympic team. In 1911, he also captained the England team that played in the United States

Olympic medal record

Men's Polo
| Silver medal – second place | 1908 London | Team competition |

== British Army soldier ==
Hardress Lloyd was commissioned a second lieutenant in the 4th Royal Irish Dragoon Guards on 10 October 1894. He was promoted to lieutenant on 1 July 1896 and served in the Tirah campaign on the North West Frontier in 1897–98. Joining the 21st Lancers in South Africa for the Second Boer War, he served as aide-de-camp to Lieutenant-General Sir Edward Locke Elliot between 26 March 1901 and September 1902. He resigned his commission in the 21st Lancers on 8 October 1902.

On the outbreak of the First World War, he served on the Western Front before joining Major-General Beauvoir De Lisle's 1st Cavalry Division staff. He followed De Lisle to Gallipoli when the latter took command of the 29th Division. Hardress Lloyd was appointed second in command of the 1st Battalion Royal Inniskilling Fusiliers in May 1916, becoming its commanding officer a month later. Whilst commanding this battalion, he was awarded the DSO in January 1917. In February 1917, he was appointed commander of D Battalion, one of the founding units of the Heavy Branch Machine Gun Corps.

The battalion's first actions were at the Battle of Arras (1917) and included the disastrous Bullecourt operation in April 1917. The 3rd Tank Brigade was formed under his command on 27 April 1917, and Hardress-Lloyd remained in charge of this brigade until the war ended. He was promoted to brigadier-general on 16 April 1918, and a Bar was added to his DSO in July. He was also mentioned in despatches six times and appointed a Chevalier of the Légion d’Honneur.
