= Auston Rotheram =

Irish polo player

Olympic medal record

Men's Polo
Silver medal – second place	1908 London	Team competition

Auston Morgan Rotheram (11 June 1876 – 13 November 1946) was an Irish polo player who competed at the 1908 Summer Olympics.

== Biography ==
He was born in Sallymount House, County Westmeath and died in Cheltenham.

Together with Percy O'Reilly, John Hardress Lloyd and John Paul McCann, he was a member of the Ireland team that won a silver medal. The Ireland team was part of the Great Britain Olympic team.
