= Mexico at the 2028 Summer Olympics =

- IOC code: MEX
- NOC: Mexican Olympic Committee
- Website: soycom.org (in Spanish)

in Los Angeles, United States 14 July 2028 – 30 July 2028
- Competitors: 28 in 2 sports
- Medals: Gold 0 Silver 0 Bronze 0 Total 0

Summer Olympics appearances (overview)
- 1900; 1904–1920; 1924; 1928; 1932; 1936; 1948; 1952; 1956; 1960; 1964; 1968; 1972; 1976; 1980; 1984; 1988; 1992; 1996; 2000; 2004; 2008; 2012; 2016; 2020; 2024; 2028

Mexico will compete at the 2028 Summer Olympics in Los Angeles from 14 to 30 July 2028. It will be the nation's twenty-sixth appearance at the Summer Olympics, having debuted in 1900. The plan for this Olympic cycle, called "Misión País" (Mission Country), was presented by CONADE's director Rommel Pacheco in February 2026 in coordination with the Mexican Olympic Committee.

== Competitors ==
The following is the list of competitors (by gender) in the Games:

Sport	Men	Women	Total
Flag football	0	10	10
Football	18	0	18
Total	18	10	28

== Flag football ==
Summary

Key:

- OT – Overtime

Team	Event	Group Stage			Semifinal / CM	Final / BM	
Team	Event	Opposition Score	Opposition Score	Rank	Opposition Score	Opposition Score	Rank
Mexico	Women's tournament						

=== Women's tournament ===
Mexico qualified a team of 10 athletes after winning the bronze medal at the 2026 IFAF Women's Flag Football World Championship in Düsseldorf, Germany.

== Football ==
Summary

Key:

- A.E.T – After extra time
- P – Match decided by penalty-shootout

Team	Event	Group Stage				Quarterfinal	Semifinal	Final / BM	
Team	Event	Opposition Score	Opposition Score	Opposition Score	Rank	Opposition Score	Opposition Score	Opposition Score	Rank
Mexico	Men's tournament								

=== Men's tournament ===
Mexico qualified a team of 18 athletes after winning the 2026 CONCACAF U-20 Championship.

Team roster

Group play

== See also ==
- Mexico at the 2027 Pan American Games
- Mexico at the 2028 Summer Paralympics
