= George Robertson (cricketer) =

Australian cricketer

Personal information
- Full name: George Pringle Robertson
- Born: 22 August 1842; Hobart, Australia
- Died: 23 June 1895 (aged 52); Melbourne, Australia
- Batting: Right-handed
- Role: Batsman
- Relatives: Jack Gannon (son-in-law)

Domestic team information
- Years: Team
- 1866: Oxford University
- 1866/67–1871/72: Victoria

Career statistics
Competition	First-class
Matches	9
Runs scored	234
Batting average	18.00
100s/50s	0/1
Top score	53
Catches/stumpings	2/–
- Source: Cricinfo, 23 February 2025

George Pringle Robertson (22 August 1842 – 23 June 1895) was an Australian cricketer. He played four first-class cricket matches for Victoria between 1866 and 1872.

== Biography ==
Robertson was a son of William Robertson who settled in Tasmania, where George was born in Hobart. When his father removed to the Western District of Victoria, he and his brothers were sent to Rugby School. He graduated thence to Trinity College, Oxford, where, in addition to a very satisfactory scholastic career, he gained his blue in 1866 as one of the University eleven, when he was rated as one of the best batsmen in England.

On returning to Victoria he settled at Colac, and with his brothers administered the family estate. He was particularly concerned in the management of the fine Lincoln flock in respect of which the partners became known among the leading sheep-breeders in Australia. He was twice president of the shire of Colac.

Though devoted to business, he still retained his love of cricket, and had the distinction of captaining the Victorian eighteen which defeated W. G. Grace's English team on the Melbourne Cricket Ground by an innings in December 1873.

In 1871 he married Annie Murray (1853-1942), daughter of Andrew Murray of Wool Wool, near Colac. They had three children.

Robertson was in indifferent health for many years, and was compelled to spend much of his time in travel, Davos, in Switzerland, being his headquarters for much of the time. In 1883, he took part in the first international toboggan competition in Davos, which he won in a tie with Swiss postman Peter Minsch.
