= Freake baronets =

Extinct baronetcy in the Baronetage of the United Kingdom

Escutcheon of the Freake baronets of Cromwell House and Fulwell Park

The Freake baronetcy, of Cromwell House in the Parish of St Mary Abbots, Kensington, and Fulwell Park in the Parish of Twickenham, both in the County of Middlesex, was a title in the Baronetage of the United Kingdom. It was created on 23 May 1882 for the architect, builder and philanthropist Charles Freake.

The 3rd Baronet was a polo player, and also served as High Sheriff of Warwickshire in 1939. The title became extinct on the death of the 4th Baronet in 1951.

== Freake baronets, of Cromwell House and Fulwell Park (1882) ==
- Sir Charles James Freake, 1st Baronet (1814–1884)
- Sir Thomas George Freake, 2nd Baronet (1848–1920), Mayor of Dartmouth, Devon.
- Sir Frederick Charles Maitland Freake, 3rd Baronet (1876–1950)
- Sir Charles Arland Maitland Freake, 4th Baronet (1904–1951), left no heir.

== Extended family ==
- The only daughter Sheila Winifred Freake (1933–2004) of the 4th Baronet married in 1957 John David O'Brien (1928–1980), son of David Edmond O'Brien, later 6th Baronet.

Baronetage of the United Kingdom
Preceded by Marling baronets	Freake baronets of Cromwell House and Fulwell Park; 23 May 1882	Succeeded by Ellis baronets
