= Alberto Ramos =

Mexican polo player

Olympic medal record

Men's polo
Bronze medal – third place	1936 Berlin	Team competition

Alberto Ramos Sesma (March 25, 1909 – March 17, 1967) was a Mexican polo player. He competed in the 1936 Summer Olympics. Born in Zanatepec, Oaxaca, he was part of the Mexican polo team, which won the bronze medal. He played all three matches in the tournament.
