= Julio Mueller =

Mexican polo player (1905–1984)

Olympic medal record

Men's polo
Bronze medal – third place	1936 Berlin	Team competition

Julio Müller Luján (28 February 1905 – 28 March 1984) was a Mexican polo player who competed in the 1936 Summer Olympics. Born in Chihuahua, Chihuahua, he was the captain of the Mexican polo team, which won the bronze medal. He played all three matches in the tournament.

Müller died on 28 March 1984 in Mexico City, at the age of 79.
