= Nelson Margetts =

American polo player

Personal information
- Born: May 27, 1879; Salt Lake City, Utah, United States
- Died: April 17, 1932 (aged 52); San Francisco, California, United States

Sport
- Sport: Polo

Nelson Emery Margetts (May 27, 1879 – April 17, 1932) was an American polo player. He competed in the polo tournament at the 1920 Summer Olympics winning a bronze medal.

Born and raised in Utah, Margetts enlisted in the United States Army on May 9, 1898, and served with the Utah Light Artillery in the Philippines during the Spanish–American War. He was offered a commission in the Artillery Corps on September 23, 1901, which he accepted on June 14, 1902. During World War I, he served on General John J. Pershing's staff in France and received a temporary promotion to colonel on June 25, 1918. After the war, Margetts reverted to his permanent rank of major on June 30, 1920. After participation in the 1920 Olympics, he was given command of the 79th Field Artillery Regiment at Camp Meade. Margetts graduated from the School of the Line in 1922, the General Staff School in 1923 and the Army War College in 1924. He was promoted to lieutenant colonel on March 26, 1924.

In December 1929, Margetts was assigned as a military attaché in China. He died at the Letterman General Hospital at the Presidio of San Francisco and was buried at the San Francisco National Cemetery.
