= Antonio Nava (polo) =

Mexican polo player

Olympic medal record

Men's polo
Bronze medal – third place	1936 Berlin	Team competition

Antonio Nava Castillo (September 9, 1905 – March 28, 1983) was a Mexican polo player who competed in the 1936 Summer Olympics. Born in Ixcaquixtla, Puebla, he was part of the Mexican polo team, which won the bronze medal. He played all three matches in the tournament. Afterwards Nava entered politics and, from 1965 to 1966, he was the Governor of Puebla.
