= Juan Gracia =

Mexican polo player

Olympic medal record

Men's polo
Bronze medal – third place	1936 Berlin	Team competition

Juan Gracia Zazueta (April 18, 1901 – October 13, 1981) was a Mexican polo player who competed in the 1936 Summer Olympics.

Born in Quiriego, Sonora, he was captain of the Mexican polo team, which won the bronze medal. He played all three matches in the tournament.
