= José Manuel Brunet =

Argentine fencer (1890–1954)

Personal information
- Full name: José Manuel Brunet Trueba
- Born: 2 May 1894 Buenos Aires, Argentina
- Died: 9 September 1950 (aged 56) La Plata, Argentina

Sport
- Sport: Fencing

José Manuel Brunet (2 May 1894 – 9 September 1950) was an Argentine fencer. He competed in the individual sabre event at the 1936 Summer Olympics.
