= Antonio Fondevilla =

Argentine sprinter

Personal information
- Nationality: Argentine
- Born: 29 October 1916
- Died: 3 August 1965 (aged 48)

Sport
- Sport: Sprinting
- Event: 100 metres

Antonio Fondevilla (29 October 1916 – 3 August 1965) was an Argentine sprinter. He competed in the men's 100 metres sprint event at the 1936 Summer Olympics.
