= Polo at the 1908 Summer Olympics =

Men's polo at the Games of the IV Olympiad
- Polo pictogram
- Venue: Hurlingham Club Polo Grounds
- Dates: 18 June 1908; 21 June 1908
- Competitors: 12 from 1 nation

Medalists
1st place, gold medalist(s)		Roehampton Club; Great Britain
2nd place, silver medalist(s)		Hurlingham Club; Great Britain
2nd place, silver medalist(s)		Ireland national polo team Great Britain

At the 1908 Summer Olympics, a polo tournament was contested. It was the second time the sport had been featured at the Olympics, with 1900 being its first appearance. The venue was the Hurlingham Polo Grounds in London. The Hurlingham Club presented a Challenge Cup to the winner of the tournament, which consisted of three teams. All three teams represented the British Olympic Association, with two from England and one from Ireland. The two English teams played each first, with the winner playing against the Irish team. Roehampton Club won both games, taking the gold medal, while the other two teams did not face each other to break the tie for second place.

== Background ==
This was the second time that polo was played at the Olympics; the sport had previously appeared in 1900 and would appear again in 1920, 1924, and 1936. Each time, the tournament was for men only.

No nations made their debut in polo in 1908, as Great Britain was the only nation represented and was making its second appearance.

== Competition format ==
Only two games were played. The winner of the first game played the team that had a bye. Games were played in six periods of ten minutes each.

== Medal table ==
Rank	Nation	Gold	Silver	Bronze	Total
1	Great Britain	1	2	0	3

== Medal summary ==
Gold	Silver	Bronze
Great Britain Roehampton Club; Charles Darley Miller; George Arthur Miller; Patteson Womersley Nickalls; Herbert Haydon Wilson	Great Britain Hurlingham; Walter Buckmaster; Frederick Freake; Walter Jones; John Wodehouse Great Britain Ireland; John Hardress Lloyd; John Paul McCann; Percy O'Reilly; Auston Rotherham	None awarded

== Team rosters ==
=== Hurlingham ===
- Walter Buckmaster
- Frederick Freake
- Walter Jones
- John Wodehouse

=== Ireland ===
- John Hardress Lloyd
- John Paul McCann
- Percy O'Reilly
- Auston Rotherham

=== Roehampton ===
- Charles Darley Miller
- George Arthur Miller
- Patteson Womersley Nickalls
- Herbert Haydon Wilson

== Results ==
=== Game 1 ===
Hurlingham scored first, with a goal in the second period by Jones. It would be the only goal scored by the team, however, as Roehampton answered with two goals in the third and added another in the fifth.

June 18	GBR Roehampton Club	3	-	1	GBR Hurlingham	Hurlingham Grounds

=== Game 2 ===
The second game was decidedly more lopsided than the first, with Roehampton scoring twice in the first period and Miller adding three more himself in the second. Ireland scored its only goal shortly before the end of the match, when the team was already down 8-0.

June 21	GBR Roehampton	8	-	1	GBR Ireland	Hurlingham Grounds

== Sources ==
- Cook, Theodore Andrea (1908). The Fourth Olympiad, Being the Official Report. London: British Olympic Association.
- De Wael, Herman (2001). "Polo 1908". Herman's Full Olympians.
