= Antonio Sande =

Argentine sprinter (born 1909)

Personal information
- Nationality: Argentine
- Born: 7 February 1909
- Died: Unknown

Sport
- Sport: Sprinting
- Event: 100 metres

Antonio Sande (born 7 February 1909, date of death unknown) was an Argentine sprinter. He competed in the men's 100 metres at the 1936 Summer Olympics.
