= Juan Nelson =

Argentine polo player

Olympic medal record

Men's polo
| Gold medal – first place | 1924 Paris | Team competition |
| Gold medal – first place | 1936 Berlin | Team competition |

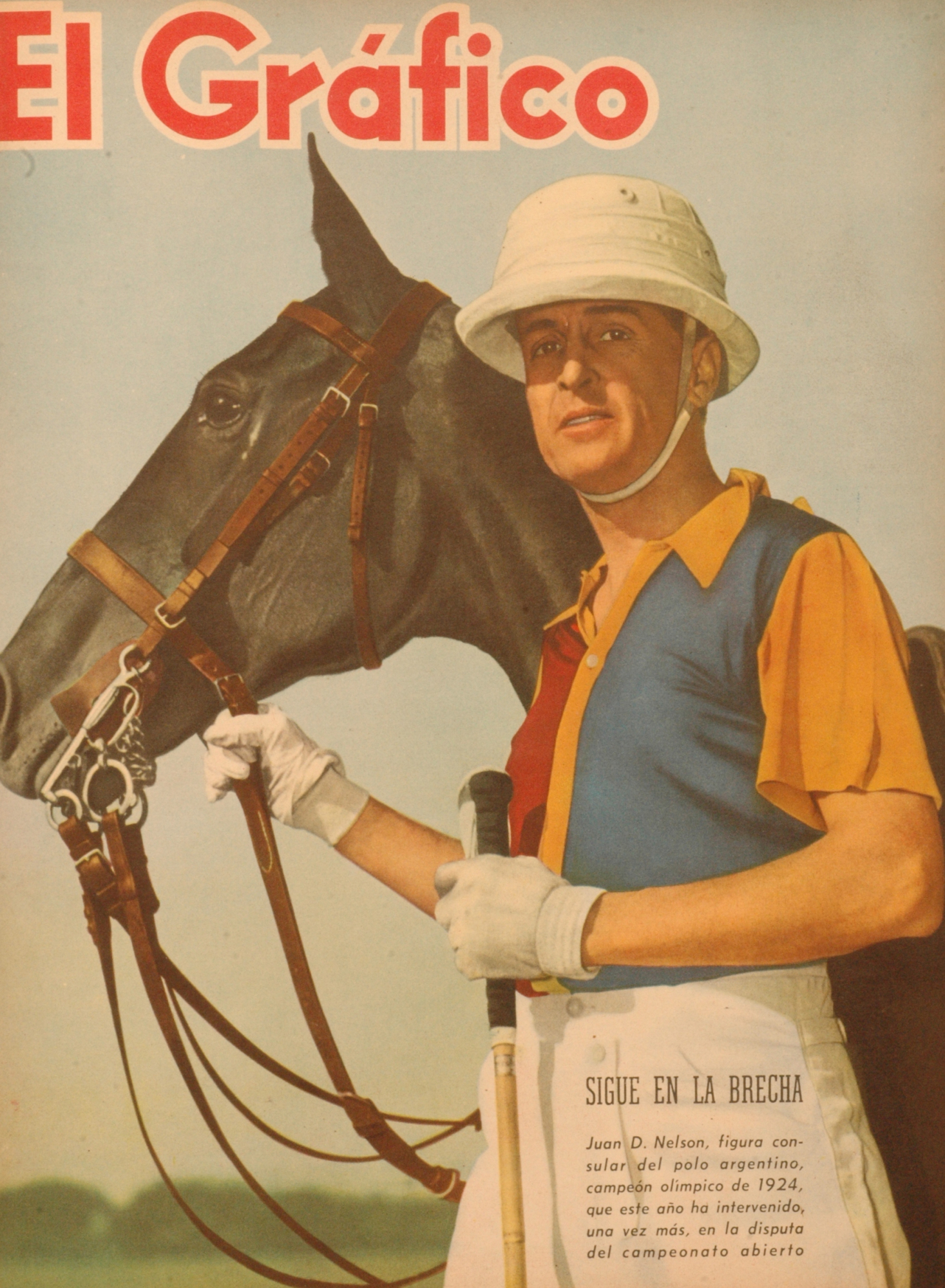
Nelson on the cover of El Gráfico, 1942

Juan Diego Nelson y Duggan, also known as Jack Nelson (26 May 1891 – 7 August 1985 in Buenos Aires, Argentina), was an Olympic Argentinian polo player during the first half of the 20th century. He was of Irish descent and was educated at Beaumont College and the University of Buenos Aires. He is listed in the Argentinian polo team roster for the 1924 Summer Olympics which won the gold medal that year. In the 1936 Summer Olympics, although he was once again part of the team Nelson is not listed as a medallist; he was the 'non-playing captain' of the team. Nevertheless, it is sometimes implied that Nelson was the first Argentinian to have won two Olympic gold medals. In 2008, Javier Mascherano became the second Argentine to win two Olympic gold medals.
