= Grand Prix Ball =

Annual charity gala held prior to the British Grand Prix

The Grand Prix Ball (GP Ball) at London's Hurlingham Club is an annual charity gala held prior to the British Grand Prix at Silverstone in support of charity; in the past The Prince's Trust, and as of 2023 UNICEF.

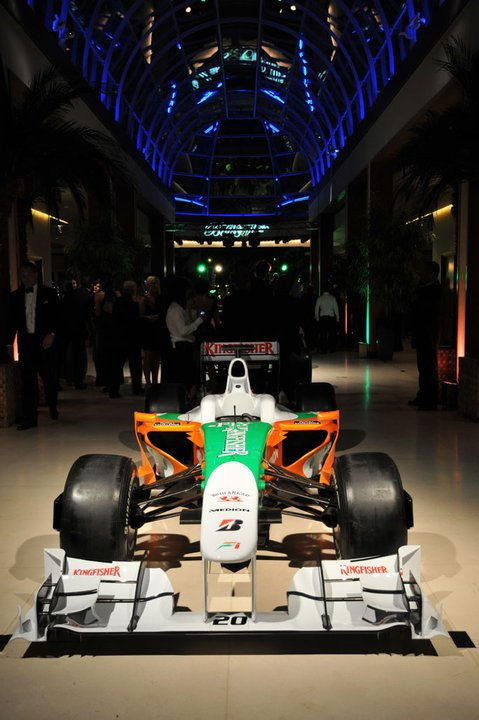
An F1 car at the Grand Prix Ball

== History ==
In 2010 it was hosted by Eddie Jordan and James Allen and had raised over £150,000 for the CLIC Sargent. The event features a showcase of F1 cars through the ages. Previous balls have been held at Stowe House and Royal Albert Hall. The 2012 event had London's only live F1 demonstration from Lotus F1 Team's Jérôme d'Ambrosio. The 2013 event featured a live F1 demonstration of Jackie Stewart's Tyrrell Racing F1 car.

In 2014, the Grand Prix Ball moved to the HAC near to the city of London. It featured as part of Race Week a day time event celebrating Formula 1 and bringing the excitement of the sport to the city. The 2014 Grand Prix Ball raised money for The Prince's Trust and offered a variety of packages to help raise funds for the charity.

In 2015, the Grand Prix Ball was held back at London's Hurlingham Club hosted by Eddie Jordan and Stirling Moss. The 2016 Grand Prix Ball was hosted in support of the Princes Trust and was hosted by Eddie Jordan the new Top Gear presenter and automotive journalist Tiff Needell.

== Performances and hosts ==
- 2010: Sugababes, Seb Fontaine, and Darius
- 2011: Rebecca Ferguson
- 2012: Sophie Ellis-Bextor
- 2013: The Feeling, Seb Fontaine
- 2014: Spandau Ballet, Ben Ainslie
- 2015: Toploader, Seb Fontaine, Stirling Moss
- 2016: M People, Seb Fontaine, Tiff Needell, Eddie Jordan
- 2017: Gipsy Kings.
- 2023: Mel C, Emma Bunton, Denise van Outen, Kai Widdrington and Nadiya Bychkova
