= Polo at the 1920 Summer Olympics =

Men's polo at the Games of the VII Olympiad
- Polo pictogram
- Venue: Ostend
- Dates: 25–31 July 1920
- Competitors: 17 from 4 nations

Medalists
1st place, gold medalist(s)		Great Britain national polo team Great Britain
2nd place, silver medalist(s)		Spain national polo team Spain
3rd place, bronze medalist(s)		United States Polo Association; United States

Polo returned to the Olympic program at the 1920 Summer Olympics in Antwerp, after not being contested at the 1912 Games. Four teams competed. Great Britain repeated as Olympic champions (though they had all three teams competing in 1908, so had won then without international competition). Spain took silver. The United States beat Belgium in the bronze medal match.

== Background ==
This was the third time that polo was played at the Olympics; the sport had previously appeared in 1900 and 1908 and would appear again in 1924 and 1936. Each time, the tournament was for men only.

Belgium and Spain made their debut in polo in 1920. Great Britain made its third appearance; it was the only nation to compete in all five editions of the Olympic polo tournament. The United States made its second appearance.

== Competition format ==
The competition was a single-elimination tournament with a bronze medal match. With 4 teams, the tournament began at the semifinals round.

== Medalists ==
Gold	Silver	Bronze
Great Britain; Teignmouth Philip Melvill; Frederick W. Barrett; John, Lord Wodehouse; Vivian Lockett	Spain; Leopoldo Saínz de la Maza, 1st Count of la Maza; Jacobo Fitz-James Stuart, 17th Duke of Alba; Hernando Fitz-James Stuart, 14th Duke of Peñaranda; Álvaro de Figueroa, 2nd Marquess of Villabrágima; José de Figueroa y Alonso-Martínez	United States; Arthur Harris; Terry Allen; John Montgomery; Nelson Margetts

The Belgian team finished in fourth place, with Alfred Grisar, Maurice Lysen, Clément Van Der Straeten and Gaston Peers de Nieuwburgh representing them.

== Bracket ==
Semifinals
1	Spain	13
4	United States	3
3	Great Britain	8
2	Belgium	3

Finals
Spain	11
Great Britain	13
Third place
United States	11
Belgium	3
