= Luis Domingo Aguirre =

Argentine sailor

Personal information
- Nationality: Argentina
- Born: 20 December 1911; Buenos Aires, Argentina

Sport
- Sport: Sailing

Luis Domingo Aguirre Barreyro (20 December 1911 – date of death unknown) was an Argentine sailor. He competed in the 1936 Summer Olympics.
