= Roberto Cavanagh =

Argentine polo player

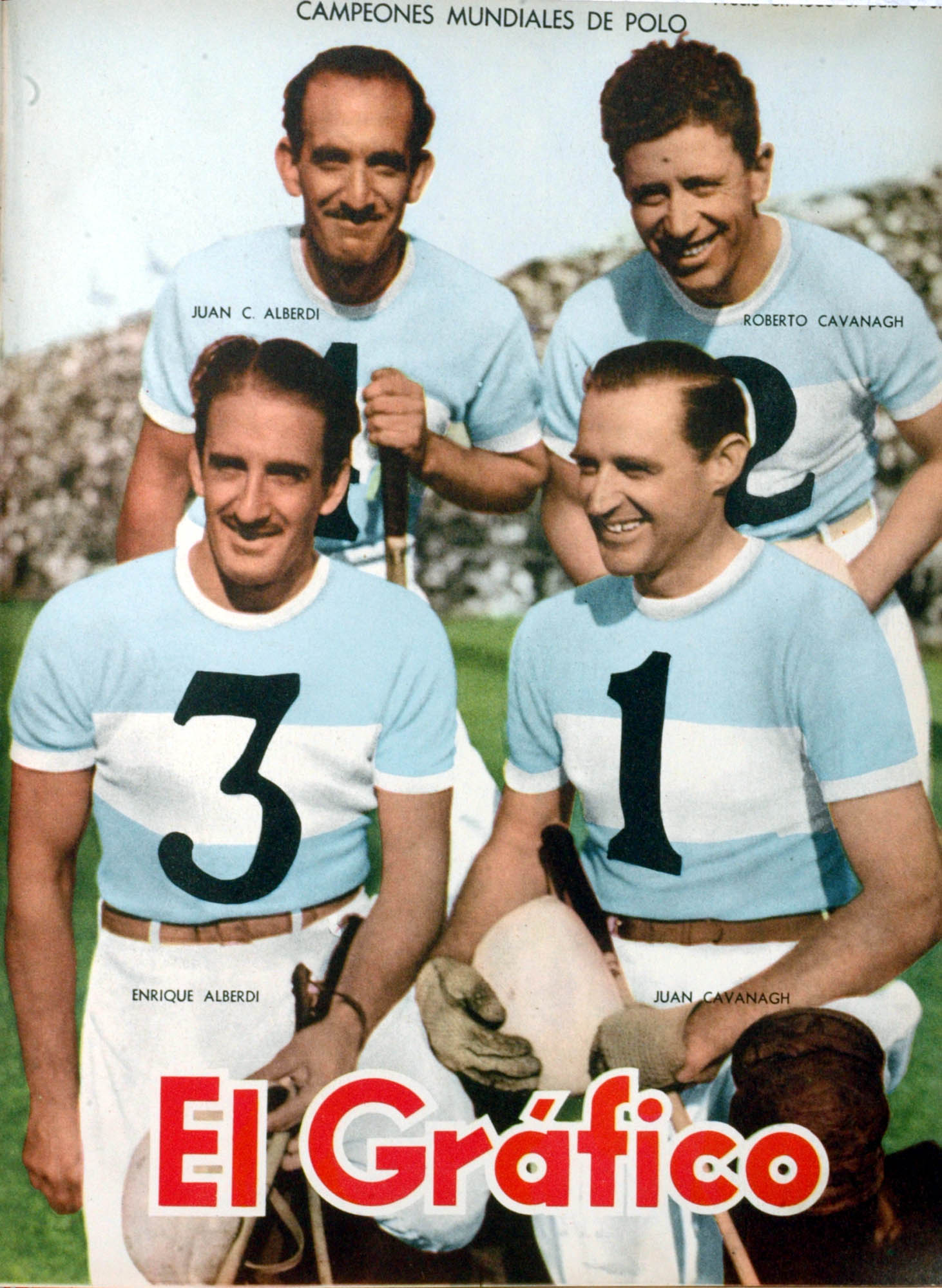
- Juan Carlos Alberdi, Roberto Cavanagh, Enrique Alberdi and Juan Cavanagh in El Gráfico, 1949

Personal information
- Born: November 12, 1914 Buenos Aires, Argentina
- Died: September 14, 2002 (aged 87) Venado Tuerto, Santa Fe, Argentina
Medal record
Men's polo
Representing Argentina
Olympic Games
Gold medal – first place	1936 Berlin	Team competition

Roberto Diego Lorenzo Cavanagh y Hearne (November 12, 1914 – September 14, 2002) was an Argentine polo player who competed in the 1936 Summer Olympics.

== Biography ==
Cavanagh was sent to work on his family's ranch at a young age after concluding that he wasn’t fit for further education. While living there, he discovered a love for riding horses, which led to his polo career. He was part of the Argentine polo team, which won the gold medal. He played both matches in the tournament, the first against Mexico and the final against Great Britain.

His daughter Roberta (1942–2002) married on 14 April 1965 Franz Ulrich, 11th Prince Kinsky of Wchinitz and Tettau but divorced on 25 April 1977. They had one son, Karl, 12th Prince Kinsky of Wchinitz and Tettau (born 10 January 1967), married in 2000 to Maria de las Dolores Beccar Varela (b. 1971); had issue.

His older brother Diego Cavanagh was also a squad member, but did not compete. He had at least two other brothers, Edmundo and Santiago.
