= Andrés Gazzotti =

Argentine polo player (1896–1984)

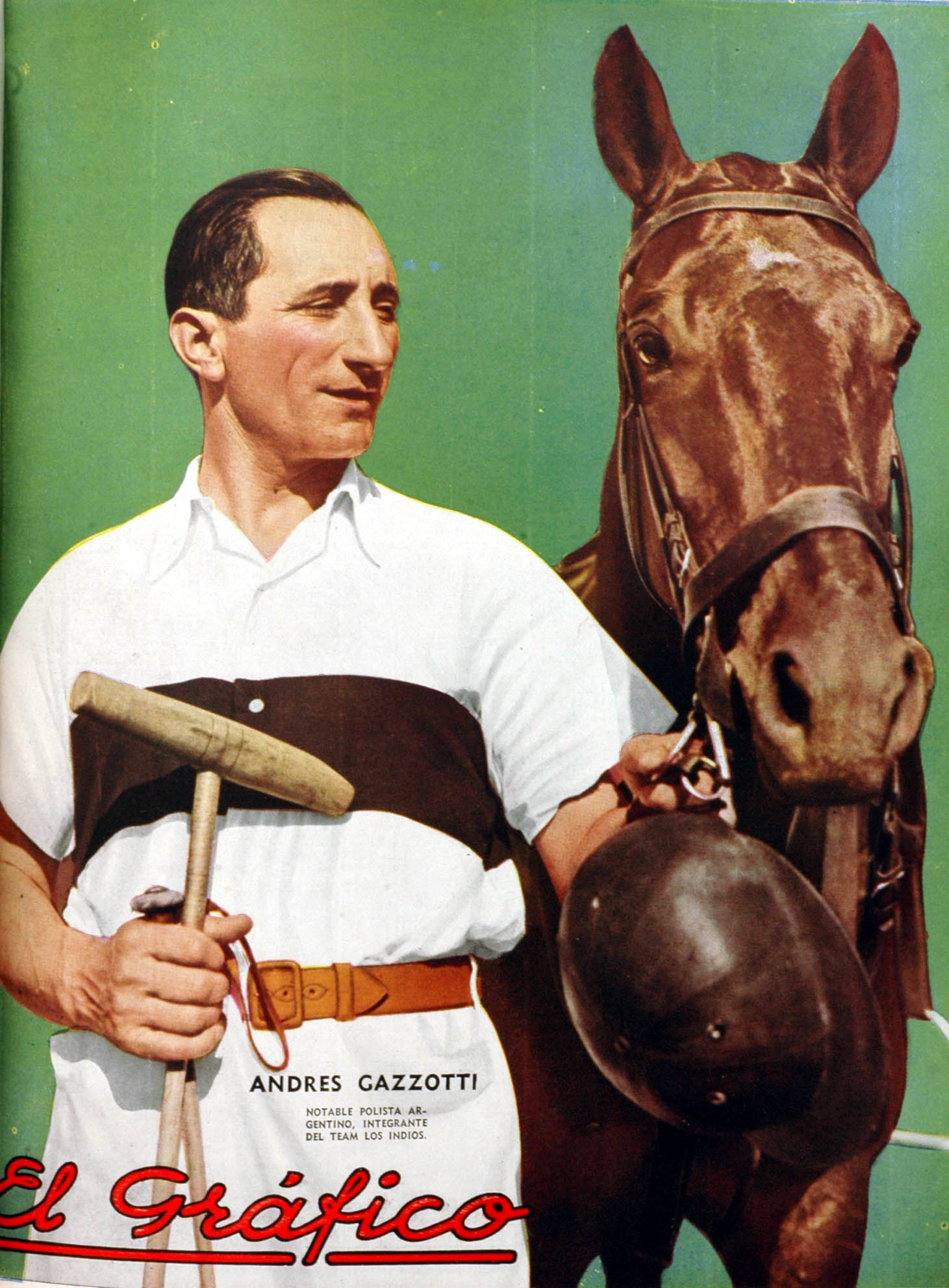

Personal information
- Born: May 5, 1896 Chacabuco, Buenos Aires, Argentina
- Died: May 1984 (aged 87–88)
Medal record
Men's polo
Representing Argentina
Olympic Games
Gold medal – first place	1936 Berlin	Team competition

Andrés Gazzotti (May 5, 1896 – 1984) was an Argentine polo player who competed in the 1936 Summer Olympics.

He was part of the Argentine polo team, which won the gold medal. He played both matches in the tournament, the first against Mexico and the final against Great Britain.
