= Charles James Freake =

English architect and builder

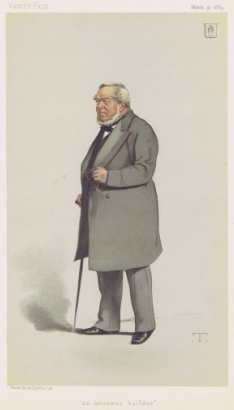
"an eminent builder" Freake as caricatured in Vanity Fair, March 1883

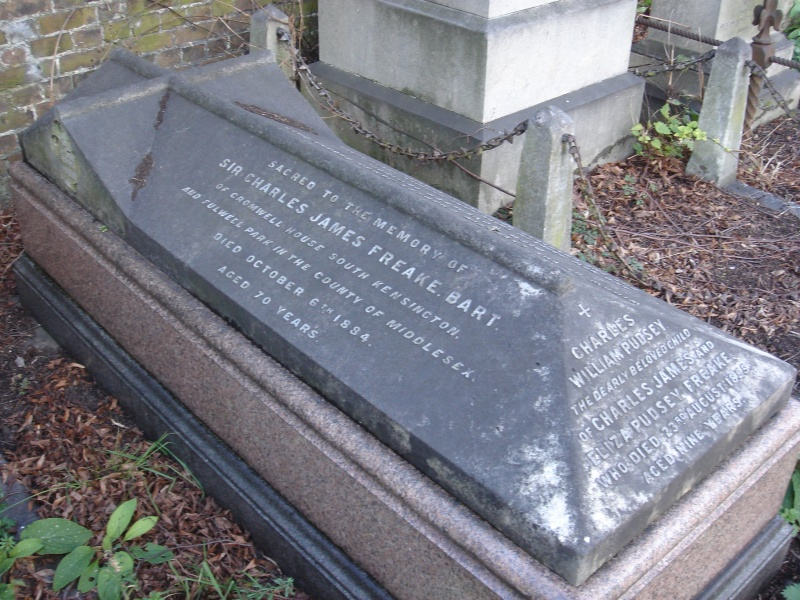
Funerary monument, Brompton Cemetery, London.

Sir Charles James Freake, 1st Baronet (7 April 1814 – 6 October 1884) was an untrained English architect and builder, responsible for many famous 19th-century façades in London, including Eaton Square, Exhibition Road and Onslow Square, mainly specialising in domestic architecture for wealthy clients. From humble beginnings and apprenticeship as a carpenter, he became a master builder, patron of the arts — especially music — and a philanthropist.

== Career ==
Freake's father, Charles Freake, was originally a coal merchant. In the 1820s, he took a lease of the Royal Oak public house in Elizabeth Street, Belgravia (a mainstay of the blossoming Grosvenor Estate), Westminster. Being a publican apparently became his main business but he speculated in building projects. In 1837, he granted his son (who was described as a carpenter) a sub-lease of a small mews house by the Royal Oak. In 1838, Charles James Freake (now described as a builder) acquired some house plots in Elizabeth Street. Over a five-year period he built forty houses in South Eaton Place and Chester Row, and on the south side of Eaton Square.

The Grosvenor Estate's London surveyor from 1828 to 1845 was George Basevi. In 1843, Basevi and Freake were involved in a joint project in Chelsea. Basevi had designed St. Jude’s Church and Freake had been appointed to build it. So, when a new tract of land became available for development in 1843 when the lease of Thomas Gibbs’ nursery expired, Basevi used his influence to obtain the contract for Freake. The trustees signed a building agreement with Freake in April 1844.

Over the next decades, the trustees entered into new-building (development) agreements with Freake in 1849, 1850, 1855, 1861, 1862 and 1883. The land he took on included nearly all the Estate west of Pelham Crescent, amounting to 40 acres (160,000 m^{2}). As "building leases" all were granted direct to Freake, rather than to backers or speculators.

Freake lived on the Estate for most of the years of its development. In 1860, he moved to Cromwell House, 21 Cromwell Road, which continued to be his London home for the rest of his life. The Prince of Wales and the Duke of Edinburgh were guests there, where he put on lavish musical and theatrical events. Freake built the National Training School for Music at his own expense in 1874–5, becoming the Royal College of Organists, now a private house, opposite the Royal Albert Hall.

This charitable act earned him a baronetcy (the title of Sir which can be passed down the male line) in 1882, with formal (seldom used) territorial designation: of Cromwell House and of Fulwell Park and which died out in 1951.

He famously only allowed straight chimneys in his buildings after his solicitor William Pulteney Scott told him about soot wart — a form of cancer of the scrotum prevalent in child sweeps. Straight chimneys allowed brushes to be used for the entire chimney and would have saved many Victorian working class children from a painful and premature death.

He died in 1884 and is buried in Brompton Cemetery, London. Even after his benefactions he was a shrewd businessman who at death had sworn (the next year) assets of £718574 12s 1d (equivalent to £77,000,000 in 2025).

== Personal life ==
He married twice; his first wife died in childbirth, and he had three daughters by his second wife. His second wife, Eliza Pudsey, died 26 November 1900 at 11 Cranley Gardens, South Kensington In 1885 and 1900 probate calendars confirm she lived also in one of the couple's additional homes, Fulwell Park in Twickenham. She had earned the title of Dame.

Baronetage of the United Kingdom
New creation	Baronet (of Cromwell House and Fulwell Park); 1882–1884	Succeeded by Thomas Freake
