= Luis Duggan =

Argentine polo player

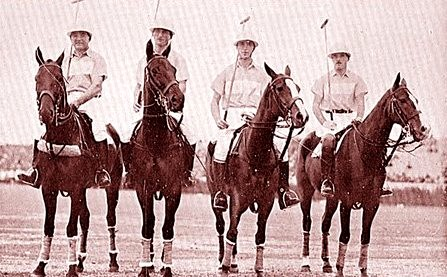
- Argentine polo team (Manuel Andrada, Andrés Gazzotti, Roberto Cavanagh, Luis Duggan) in 1936

Personal information
- Born: March 6, 1906 Buenos Aires, Argentina
- Died: June 12, 1987 (aged 81)
Medal record
Men's polo
Representing Argentina
Olympic Games
Gold medal – first place	1936 Berlin	Team competition

Luis Jorge Duggan Ham (born March 6, 1906 – June 12, 1987) was an Argentine polo player who competed in the 1936 Summer Olympics.

He was of Irish descent; his family had immigrated to Argentina from County Westmeath in 1849 with the goal of becoming sheep farmers. He was part of the Argentine polo team, which won the gold medal. He played both matches in the tournament, the first against Mexico and the final against Great Britain.
