= Eustaquio Escandón =

Mexican polo player

Olympic medal record

Men's polo
Bronze medal – third place	1900 Paris	Team competition

José Eustaquio Luis Francisco Escandón y Barrón (January 25, 1862 – December 22, 1933) was a Mexican polo player in the 1900 Summer Olympics with the team that won the bronze medal.

He was born in Paris, France, in to a very wealthy family who were in the wool industry, he had four sisters and three brothers, two of the brothers were Manuel and Pablo, who would compete with him at the 1900 Summer Olympics.

In 1900 he was part of the Mexican polo team which won the bronze medal. He played together with his two brothers and Guillermo Hayden Wright.

That year's polo tournament had five teams competing, most with mixed nationalities, they were the Bagatelle Polo Club de Paris, BLO Polo Club Rugby, Compiégne Polo Club, the eventual winners Foxhunters Hurlingham and the Mexican team (the only one without a team name).

Despite losing their only game against the BLO Polo Club Rugby, they were tied with the Bagatelle Polo Club de Paris, and as the rules didn't stipulate a third place playoff, they were both awarded the third place, however, their bronze medal was not recognized until time later, as back then, the winners received a silver medal instead of the actual gold and it was the second place the one that received bronze, but when current rules were established, previous results were updated and the medals were officially awarded.

Escandón was twice married first time in 1884 in Paris, and after his wife died in 1910 he remarried in 1911 in London.
