= Guillermo Hayden Wright =

American polo player

Medal record

Men's polo

Representing Mexico

Olympic Games
| Bronze medal – third place | 1900 Paris | Team competition |

Guillermo Hayden Wright (February 12, 1872 – 1949), or more accurately, William Hayden Wright, was an American polo player in the 1900 Summer Olympics. He was part of the Mexican polo team that won the bronze medal, alongside brothers Eustaquio, Manuel and Pablo Escandón.

That year's polo tournament had five teams competing, most with mixed nationalities, they were the Bagatelle Polo Club de Paris, BLO Polo Club Rugby, Compiégne Polo Club, the eventual winners Foxhunters Hurlingham and the Mexican team (the only one without a team name).

Despite losing their only game against the BLO Polo Club Rugby, they were tied with the Bagatelle Polo Club de Paris, and as the rules didn't stipulate a third place playoff, they were both awarded the third place, however, their bronze medal was not recognized until time later, as back then, the winners received a silver medal instead of the actual gold and it was the second place the one that received bronze, but when current rules were established, previous results were updated and the medals were officially awarded.
