= Manuel Andrada =

Argentine polo player (1890–1962)

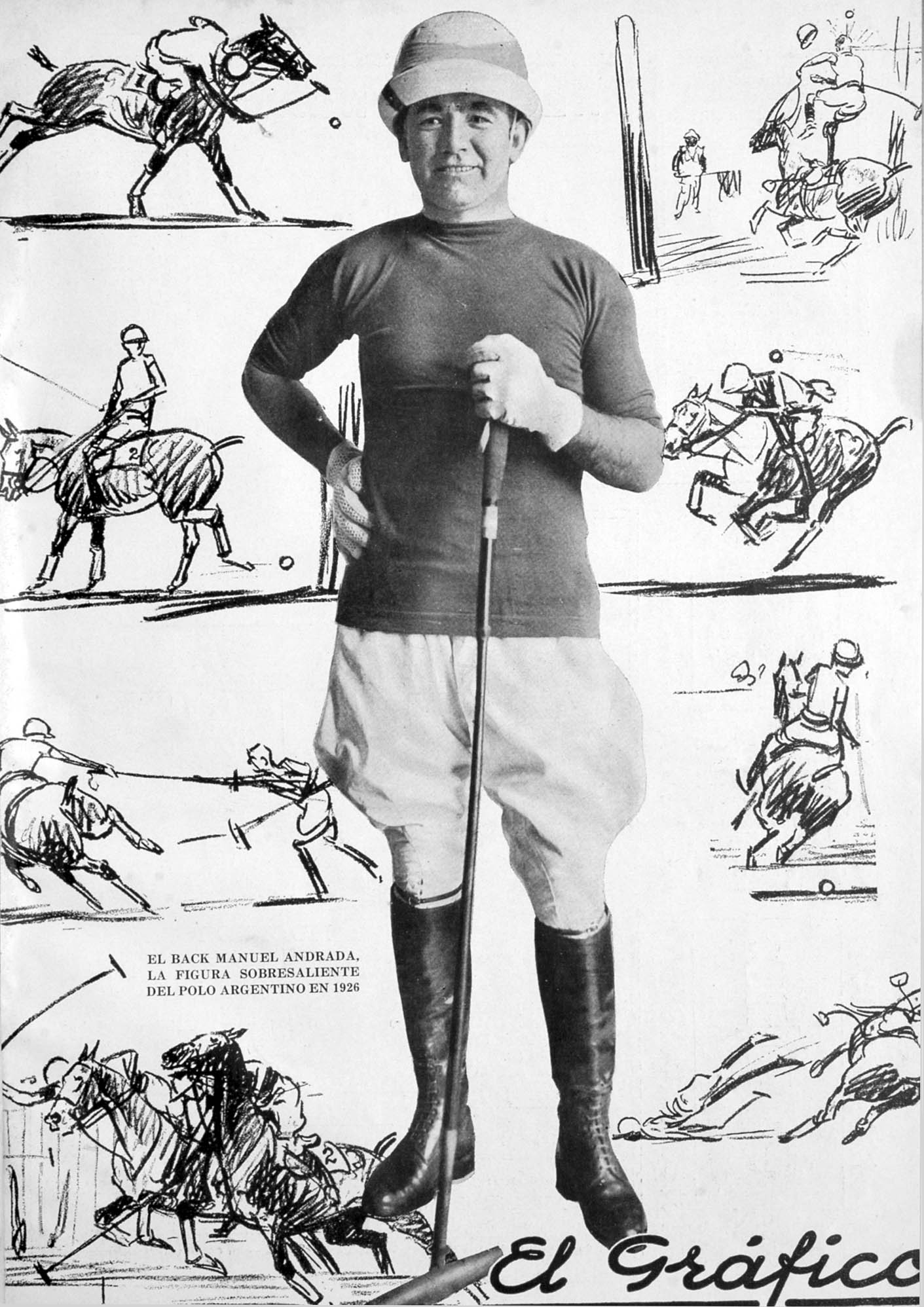
- Andrada in 1926

Personal information
- Born: September 1, 1890 Coronel Suárez, Argentina
- Died: September 21, 1962 (aged 72) Laguna del Sauce, Córdoba Province, Argentina
Medal record
Men's polo
Representing Argentina
Olympic Games
Gold medal – first place	1936 Berlin	Team competition

Manuel Ángel Andrada Ballesteros (9 January 1890 – 21 September 1962) was an Argentine nine-goal polo player who won the gold medal in the 1936 Summer Olympics.

== Early life ==
Manuel Andrada was born in 1890 on an estancia in Curumalal near Coronel Suárez, Buenos Aires Province, Argentina. He worked as a horse trainer and later took up polo.

== Polo career ==
He was a nine-goaler. His team won the Pacific Coast Polo Championship in 1930. The following year, in 1931, he was on the winning team of the U.S. Open Polo Championship. Moreover, his team won the Campeonato Argentino Abierto de Polo in 1930, 1931, 1933, 1935, 1938 and 1939.

He was part of the Argentine polo team, which won the gold medal at the 1936 Summer Olympics. He played both matches in the tournament, the first against Mexico and the final against Great Britain. He was the oldest sportsman to receive an Olympic gold medal according to the Guinness World Records.

He was nicknamed "Paisano" (′peasant′). He has been called, "the first Argentine-born star player" by polo historian Horace Laffaye.

== Personal life ==
He had three sons: Manuel Hector, Oscar Miguel and Eduardo Diego.

== Death ==
He died in 1962 in Laguna del Sauce, Córdoba Province, Argentina.

== Legacy ==
His descendants own the Paisano Polo Club in Río Cuarto, Córdoba Province, Argentina.
