= Diego Cavanagh =

Argentine polo player

Santiago Miguel "Diego" Cavanagh y Hearne (May 16, 1905 – July 30, 1977) was an Argentine polo player at the 1936 Summer Olympics.

He was a squad member of the Argentine polo team, which won the gold medal. He did not compete in the Berlin tournament, but was a reserve player.

His younger brother Roberto Cavanagh was also a squad member. He played in both games.
