= Pablo Escandón =

Mexican polo player and Governor of Morelos

Olympic medal record

Men's polo
Bronze medal – third place	1900 Paris	Team competition

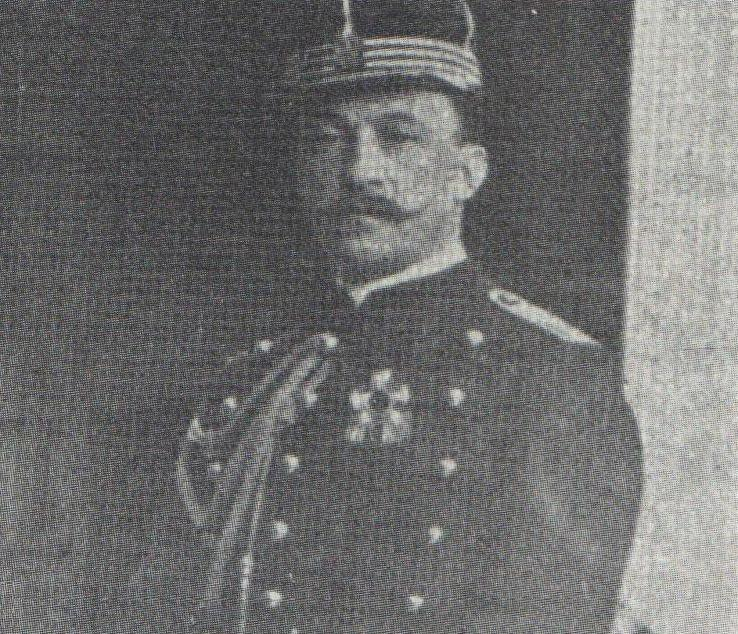
General Pablo Eustaquio

José Pablo Eustaquio Manuel Francisco de Escandón y Barrón (May 4, 1856, in Mexico City – March 31, 1929, in Mexico City) was a Mexican polo player in the 1900 Summer Olympics.

He was born in Mexico City to an old aristocratic family with extensive haciendas in nearby Morelos, of which he was briefly the Porfirian governor in 1909–11, before being deposed in the Mexican Revolution. His two younger brothers, Manuel and Eustaquio, also played Olympic polo.

In 1900 he was part of the Mexican polo team which won the bronze medal. He played together with his two brothers and Guillermo Hayden Wright.

That year's polo tournament had five teams competing, most with mixed nationalities, they were the Bagatelle Polo Club de Paris, BLO Polo Club Rugby, Compiégne Polo Club, the eventual winners Foxhunters Hurlingham and the Mexican team (the only one without a team name).

Despite losing their only game against the BLO Polo Club Rugby, they were tied with the Bagatelle Polo Club de Paris, and as thens rules didn't stipulate a third place playoff, they were both awarded the third place, however, their bronze medal was not recognized until time later, as back then, the winners received a silver medal instead of the actual gold and it was the second place the one that received bronze, but when current rules were established, previous results were updated and the medals were officially awarded.
