= Polo at the 1900 Summer Olympics =

Men's polo at the Games of the II Olympiad
- Polo pictogram
- Venue: Bois de Boulogne
- Dates: 28 May – 2 June 1900
- Competitors: 19 from 4 nations

Medalists
1st place, gold medalist(s)		Foxhunters Hurlingham; Great Britain
2nd place, silver medalist(s)		BLO Polo Club Rugby; Great Britain
3rd place, bronze medalist(s)		Bagatelle Polo Club de Paris; France
3rd place, bronze medalist(s)		North American Team; Mixed team

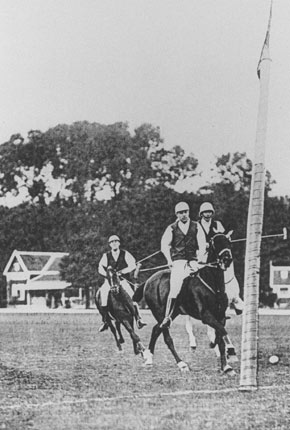
Polo tournament at the 1900 Olympic Games

At the 1900 Summer Olympics, a polo tournament was contested. Matches were held on 28 May, 31 May, and 2 June. Five club teams competed, with four mixed teams consisting of athletes of different nationality. British and French athletes competed together on three of the teams. In accordance with the attribution of team events at the 1900 Games, participation and medals were assigned based on the affiliation of the represented club rather than the nationalities of the individual competitors. No playoff for third place was held.

== Background ==
The "Olympic" polo tournament, or the "Grand Prix International d'Exposition", was one of multiple polo tournaments played in Paris in late May and early June 1900. It was the first time that polo was played at the Olympics; the sport would appear again in 1908, 1920, 1924, and 1936. Each time, the tournament was for men only.

== Competition format ==
The competition was a single elimination tournament, with no third place match. Teams did not have to consist of entirely players from a single nation at the time, with four of the five competing teams being mixed.

Further, players were apparently permitted to play for multiple teams during the same tournament: Maurice Raoul-Duval played for both Bagatelle and Compiègne.

== Participating nations ==
A total of 20 players from 4 nations competed at the Paris Games:

- France (7)
- Great Britain (6)
- Mexico (3)
- United States (4)

== Results ==
Quarterfinal
28 May
Foxhunters Hurlingham (GBR)	10
Compiègne Polo Club (FRA)	0

Semi-finals
31 May
Foxhunters Hurlingham (GBR)	6
Bagatelle Polo Club de Paris (FRA)	4
31 May
BLO Polo Club Rugby (GBR)	8
North American Team (ZZX)	0

Final
2 June
Foxhunters Hurlingham (GBR)	3
BLO Polo Club Rugby (GBR)	1

Rank	Team	NOC affiliation of club	Nationalities of Athletes
1st place, gold medalist(s)	Foxhunters Hurlingham	Great Britain	Great Britain; United States
2nd place, silver medalist(s)	BLO Polo Club Rugby	Great Britain	Great Britain; United States; France
3rd place, bronze medalist(s)	Bagatelle Polo Club de Paris	France	France; Great Britain
3rd place, bronze medalist(s)	North American Team	Mixed team	Mexico; United States
5	Compiègne Polo Club	France	France

== Rosters ==
Foxhunters Hurlingham

- John Beresford (GBR)
- Denis St. George Daly (GBR)
- Foxhall Parker Keene (USA)
- Frank MacKey (USA)
- Alfred Rawlinson (GBR)

BLO Polo Club Rugby

- Walter Buckmaster (GBR)
- Frederick Freake (GBR)
- Walter McCreery (USA)
- Jean de Madre (FRA)

Bagatelle Polo Club de Paris

- Robert Fournier-Sarlovèze (FRA)
- Frederick Agnew Gill (GBR)
- Maurice Raoul-Duval (FRA) (Note: Raoul-Duval played on two different French teams, Bagatelle Polo Club de Paris and Compiègne Polo Club.)
- Édouard Alphonse James de Rothschild (FRA)

North American Team

- Eustaquio de Escandón (MEX)
- Manuel de Escandón (MEX)
- Pablo de Escandón (MEX)
- Guillermo Hayden Wright (USA) (Note: The identity of the 1900 U.S. polo player named Wright is uncertain. The International Olympic Committee (IOC) and Olympedia identify him as William Hayden Wright, winner of the 1898–99 Paris International and the Paris Open, while other sources identify him as Guillermo Wright. The latter is plausible, as the rest of his 1900 polo team was Mexican.)

Compiègne Polo Club

- Armand de La Rochefoucauld, duc de Bisaccia (FRA)
- Jean Boussod (FRA)
- André Fauquet-Lemaître (FRA)
- Maurice Raoul-Duval (FRA)

== Medal table ==
Rank	NOC	Gold	Silver	Bronze	Total
1	Great Britain	1	1	0	2
2	France	0	0	1	1
2	Mixed team	0	0	1	1
Totals (3 entries)		1	1	2	4
