= Polo at the 1936 Summer Olympics =

Polo at the Olympics

Men's polo at the Games of the XI Olympiad
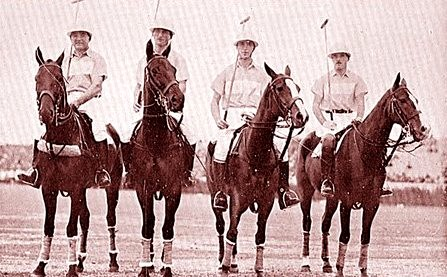
- Argentina polo team, gold medal winner
- Venue: Olympiastadion
- Dates: 3–8 August 1936
- Competitors: 21 from 5 nations

Medalists
1st place, gold medalist(s)		Argentina
2nd place, silver medalist(s)		Great Britain
3rd place, bronze medalist(s)		Mexico

Polo returned to the Olympic program at the 1936 Summer Olympics in Berlin, after not being contested at the 1928 Games or 1932 Games. The 1936 tournament was the last time that the sport was contested at the Olympic Games. Argentina repeated as champions, winning gold medals in both of the Games in which the nation competed. Great Britain took silver; British polo players had earned medals in all five of the Olympic polo tournaments (including as members of mixed teams in 1900). Mexico took bronze, matching its previous performance in 1900.

== Background ==
This was the fifth and final time that polo was played at the Olympics; the sport had previously appeared in 1900, 1908, 1920, and 1924. Each time, the tournament was for men only. For 72 years, polo had the distinction of being the last sport to be removed from the Olympic programme; baseball/softball took that position after the 2008 Games.

Argentina and the United States were the top two polo-playing nations in the world. The 1924 Olympic tournament had come down to a 6–5 Argentine victory to determine the gold medal; the United States beat Argentina in 1928 and 1932 Copa de las Américas during years in which the sport was not contested at the Olympics. The Americans did not send a team to Berlin, leaving Argentina the heavy favorites at the 1936 Games. Later that year, Argentina would take the Cup over the United States for the first time, in Meadow Brook Club, New York [3].

Germany and Hungary each made their debut in polo in 1936. Great Britain made its fifth appearance; it was the only nation to compete in all five editions of the Olympic polo tournament. Argentina and Mexico each made their second appearance.

== Competition format ==
The tournament used an ad hoc format deliberately designed to create a final between the recognized strongest teams in the tournament, Argentina and Great Britain. The hosts, as well as Hungary, were not even given an opportunity to contend for the gold medal, with the teams separated into divisions.

The first three matches were set to pit Mexico against first Great Britain and then Argentina in the top division, and Germany against Hungary in the lower division. If, as expected, Mexico lost both games, the match between Great Britain and Argentina would be the gold medal final. The winner between Germany and Hungary would play Mexico for the bronze medal.

== Medalists ==
Gold	Silver	Bronze
Argentina Manuel Andrada; Roberto Cavanagh; Luis Duggan; Andrés Gazzotti	Great Britain David Dawnay; Bryan Fowler; Humphrey Patrick Guinness; William Hinde	Mexico Juan Gracia; Julio Mueller; Antonio Nava; Alberto Ramos

Note: The International Olympic Committee medal database shows only these players as medalists. They all played at least one match during the tournament. The reserve players are not listed as medalists.

== Participating nations ==
Each country was allowed to enter one team of 8 players and they all were eligible for participation.

A total of 21(*) polo players from 5 nations competed at the Berlin Games:

- Argentina (4 - from a squad of 7)
- Germany (4 - from a squad of 6)
- Great Britain (4 - from a squad of 6)
- Hungary (5 - from a squad of 8)
- Mexico (4 - from a squad of 6)

(*) NOTE: Only players who participated in at least one game are counted.

Only a few reserve players are known.

The organizers also invited United States and India, but those nations declined to send teams.

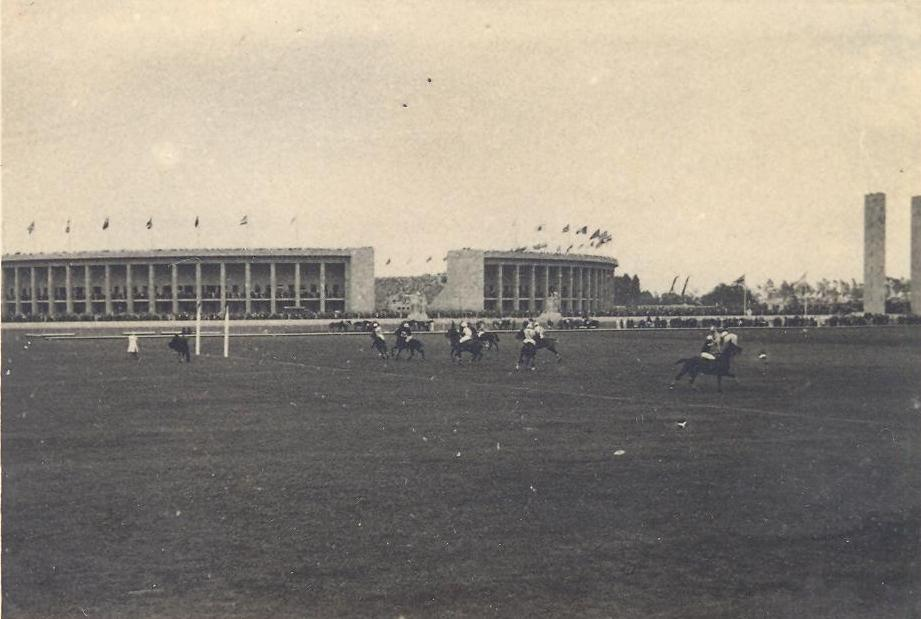
Polo at the 1936 Summer Olympics

== Results ==
Group A

3 August

Great Britain	13–11	Mexico

5 August

Argentina	15–5	Mexico

Group B

4 August

Hungary	8–8	Germany

6 August

Hungary	16–6	Germany

Bronze medal match

6 August

Mexico	16–2	Hungary

Final

7 August

Argentina	15–5	Great Britain

== Summary ==
Rank	Nation
1st place, gold medalist(s)	Argentina; Luis Duggan; Roberto Cavanagh; Andrés Gazzotti; Manuel Andrada; Enrique J. Alberdi; Diego Cavanagh; Juan Nelson; Juan Jose Reynal
2nd place, silver medalist(s)	Great Britain; Bryan Fowler; William Hinde; David Dawnay; Humphrey Guinness
3rd place, bronze medalist(s)	Mexico; Juan Gracia; Julio Mueller; Antonio Nava; Alberto Ramos; Alfinio Flores; Miguel Zabalgoitia; Antonio Pérez Ortega
4	Hungary Kálmán Bartalis; István Bethlen; Tivadar Dienes-Öhm; Dezső Kovács; Imre Szentpály
5	Germany Heinrich Amsinck; Walter Bartram; Arthur Köser; Robert Miles Reincke Erich Ottens
