= The Hurlingham Club =

Organisation

Coordinates: 51°28′01″N 0°12′03″W

- Founded: 1869; 157 years ago
- Type: Private members' club
- Purpose: Sports and social club
- Location: Ranelagh Gardens, Fulham, London, SW6 3PR, England
- Colours: White and Turquoise Blue
- Activities: Backgammon, Bowls, Bridge, Chess, Cricket, Croquet, Golf, Skittles, Squash, Swimming, Tennis
- Website: hurlinghamclub.org.uk

The Hurlingham Club is an ultra-exclusive private social and athletic club located in the Fulham area of London, England. Founded in 1869, it has a Georgian-style clubhouse set in 42 acres (17 ha) of grounds. It is a member of the Association of London Clubs.

== History ==
=== Early history ===
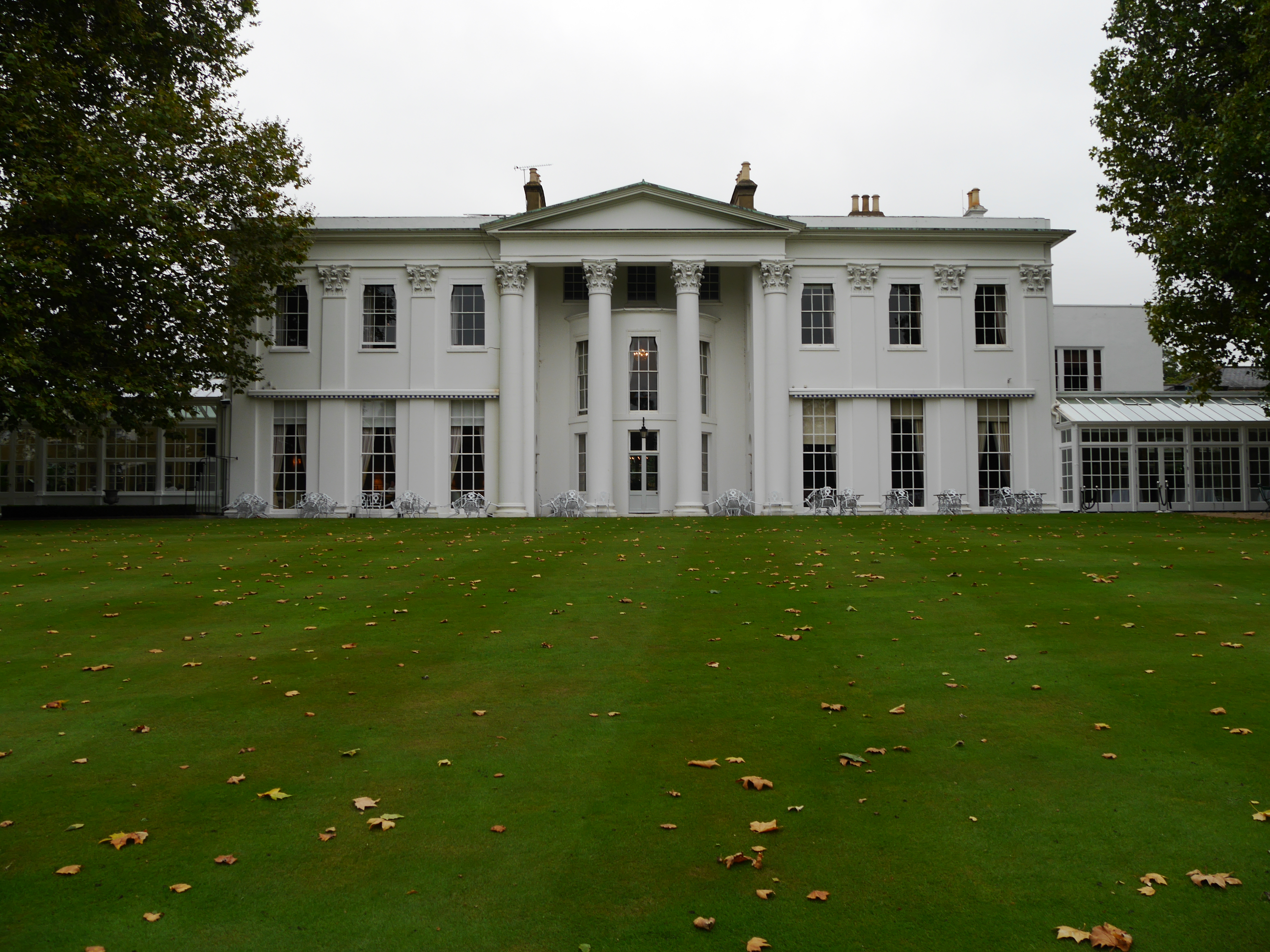
The clubhouse in 2016

The Gun Club was formed in 1860 at the Hornsey Wood Tavern, which stood in what today is Finsbury Park in Harringay, London. The creation of the park in 1867 forced a relocation and Frank Heathcote received the permission of Richard Naylor to promote live pigeon shooting at his Hurlingham estate. His next step was the formation of the Hurlingham Club for this purpose and "as an agreeable country resort". The club leased the estate from Naylor in 1869 and in 1874 acquired the land outright for £27,500. The pigeon today forms part of the club's crest. Until 1905, clouds of pigeons were released in the summer from an enclosure, near what is now a tennis pavilion.

The Prince of Wales (later King Edward VII), an early patron, was a keen shot and his presence ensured the club's status and notability from the beginning. The club's most recent patron was Prince Philip, Duke of Edinburgh.

In the early 2000s, Russian billionaire Roman Abramovich reportedly sought to acquire The Hurlingham Club for around £1 billion, offering to pay each existing member approximately £1 million to relinquish their membership. The proposal was rejected by the club’s membership, allowing it to remain independent and retain its longstanding traditions.

=== Polo ===
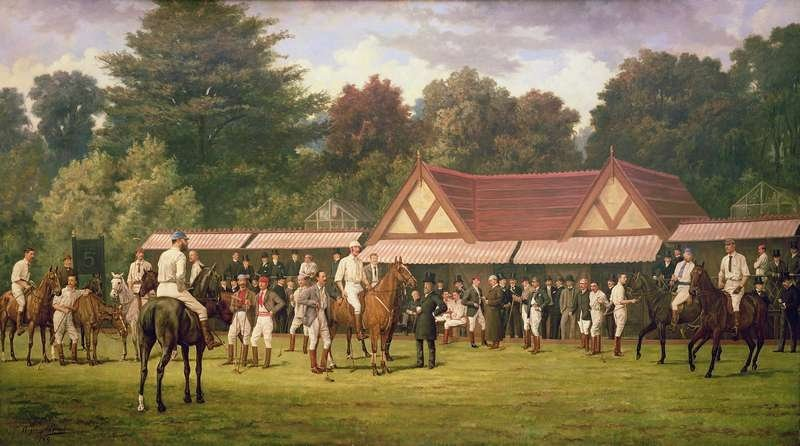
Polo at Hurlingham, painting by Henry Jamyn Brooks

In 1873, the club published the rules of polo, which are still followed by most of the world to this day. Polo was first played at the club on 6 June 1874. On 18 July 1878, the club along with Ranelagh became the first to play a sports match under floodlights. In 1886, the club hosted the first international polo match between England and the United States. The polo matches for the 1908 Summer Olympics were played at Hurlingham. Three teams entered: Hurlingham, Roehampton Club, and a combined British and Irish team. Roehampton won.

The Westchester Cup was played at the club in 1900, 1902, 1909, 1921 and 1936. Before the Second World War, Hurlingham was the headquarters of British polo. The governing body of British polo is called the Hurlingham Polo Association. However polo is no longer staged at Hurlingham after the size of the club was significantly reduced after the war when the polo fields were compulsorily purchased by the Metropolitan Borough of Fulham to build housing (the Sulivan Court estate). The Guards Polo Club in Windsor Great Park has succeeded to the status of the leading British polo club.

=== Other sports ===
Hurlingham has been at the centre of world croquet for many years. The Croquet Association had its headquarters in the club from 1959 to 2002. Top-ranking international competitions, including the Croquet World Cup are regularly held on the lawns, at one time the finest in the country, though the CA headquarters have since relocated to the Cheltenham Croquet Club.

Other sports include lawn tennis, cricket, bowls, skittles, squash and swimming (with both indoor and outdoor pools) as well as fitness facilities and a gymnasium. Games such as bridge, backgammon and chess are popular indoor pursuits. The club has also hosted the Grand Prix Ball and the Concours d'Elegance.

== Membership ==
Members must be proposed and seconded by two current full members of the club. Since 2018, the waiting list for becoming a member has been closed, but children and spouses of current members are given preference when vacancies do arise. The club currently has around 13,000 members, of whom around 6,000 have full voting rights.

=== Notable members ===
Lord Fowler, Lord Temple-Morris, The Princess of Wales, Adam Raphael, novelist and peer Lord Jeffrey Archer, the actor Trevor Eve and his wife Sharon Maughan are all members of the Hurlingham Club. Past members include Brigadier Jack Gannon, Walter Buckmaster, the Carry On actress Liz Fraser and Air Vice-Marshal Sir William Cushion.

== See also ==
- Hurlingham Park
- List of gentlemen's clubs in London
- Stoke Park
- Gleneagles
- Skibo Castle

== Bibliography ==
- The Hurlingham Club, 1869–1953, by Henry Taprell Dorling (1953)
- Pigeons, Polo, and Other Pastimes: A History of the Hurlingham Club, by Nigel Miskin (2000)
- Thévoz, Seth Alexander (2025). London Clubland: A Companion for the Curious. London: Robinson/Little, Brown. ISBN 978-1472149985.
