= Hockey at the 2006 Commonwealth Games – Men's team squads =

This article lists the squads for the Men's hockey at the 2006 Commonwealth Games in Melbourne, Australia.

== Squads ==
=== Australia ===
(1.) Jamie Dwyer, (2.) Liam de Young, (4.) Michael McCann, (6.) Robert Hammond, (7.) Nathan Eglington, (9.) Mark Knowles, (13.) Luke Doerner, (14.) Grant Schubert, (15.) Bevan George, (18.) Stephen Lambert, (21.) Aaron Hopkins, (23.) Matthew Wells, (24.) Travis Brooks, (25.) Brent Livermore, (26.) Dean Butler, and (30.) Stephen Mowlam. Head coach: Barry Dancer.

=== Canada ===
(1.) Matthew Peck, (2.) Mike Mahood, (3.) Anthony Wright, (5.) Robin D'Abreo, (6.) Marian Schole, (7.) Michael Lee, (8.) Philip Wright, (9.) Ken Pereira, (10.) Wayne Fernandes, (11.) Peter Short, (12.) Dave Jameson, (13.) Rob Short, (16.) Scott Sandison, (17.) Connor Grimes, (18.) Paul Wettlaufer, (21.) Ravi Kahlon. Head coach: Gene Muller.

=== England ===
(4.) Glenn Kirkham, (5.) Richard Alexander, (9.) Martin Jones, (10.) Matt Daly, (11.) Brett Garrard, (12.) Jonty Clarke, (13.) Rob Moore, (14.) Ben Hawes, (15.) Scott Cordon, (18.) Barry Middleton, (20.) James Tindall, (21.) Jon Bleby, (23.) Jon Ebsworth, (24.) Ben Marsden, (25.) James Fair, and (28.) Simon Mantell. Head coach: Jason Lee.

=== Malaysia ===
(1.) Ibrahim Mohamed Nasihin, (2.) Rahim Muhamad Amin, (3.) Boon Huat Chua, (4.) Kali Logan Raj, (5.) Kuham Shanmuganathan, (6.) Bakar Nor Azlan, (7.) Megat Termizi Megat Azrafiq, (8.) Mohan Jiwa, (9.) Nor Mohamed Madzli, (10.) Tengku Ahmad, (11.) Mat Radzi Mohamed Rodzhanizam, (12.) Kali Keevan Raj, (13.) Abu Ismail, (14.) Azlan Misron, (15.) Mohan Jivan, and (16.) Kumar Subramaniam. Head coach: Wallace Tan.

=== New Zealand ===
(4.) Darren Smith, (6.) Simon Child, (7.) Blair Hopping, (8.) Dean Couzins, (10.) Ryan Archibald, (12.) Bradley Shaw, (14.) Bevan Hari, (16.) Paul Woolford, (17.) Kyle Pontifex, (18.) Phil Burrows, (19.) Hayden Shaw, (20.) James Nation, (21.) Bryce Collins, (24.) Gareth Brooks, (25.) Shea McAleese, and (30.) Ben Collier. Head coach: Kevin Towns.

=== Scotland ===
(1.) Alistair McGregor, (2.) David Mitchell, (3.) Michael Leonard, (4.) Adam MacKenzie, (5.) Niall Stott, (6.) Jonathan Christie, (7.) David Mansouri, (8.) Vishal Marwaha, (9.) Graham Moodie, (10.) Douglas Simpson, (11.) Mark Ralph, (12.) Michael Christie, (13.) Allan Dick, (14.) David Ralph, (15.) Stephen Dick, and (16.) Graham Dunlop. Head coach: Mathias Ahrens.

=== India ===
(1.) Bharat Chettri, (2.) Deepak Thakur, (3.) Kanwalpreet Singh, (4.) Sandeep Singh, (5.) Tejbir Singh, (6.) Ignace Tirkey, (10.) Prabodh Tirkey, (11.) Deedar Singh, (12.) Baljit Singh, (15.) Rajpal Singh, (19.) Sardara Singh, (21.) Viren Rasquinha, (23.) Arjun Halappa, (25.) William Xalco, (27.) Vikram Pillay, and (28.) Tushar Khandekar. Head coach: Rajinder Singh.

=== South Africa ===
(1.) Chris Hibbert, (2.) Franci du Plessis, (3.) Ken Forbes, (4.) Kyle Rhodes, (5.) Darryn Gallagher, (6.) Bruce Jacobs, (7.) John Paul, (8.) Wayne Madsen, (9.) Lungile Tsolekile, (10.) Jody Paul, (11.) Clyde Abrahams, (12.) Ian Symons, (13.) Leroy Phillips, (14.) Charles Rose-Innes, (15.) Reece Basson, and (16.) Justin Reid-Ross. Head coach: Paul Revington.

=== Pakistan ===
(1.) Salman Akbar, (2.) Imram Warsi, (5.) Muhammad Saqlain, (7.) Dilawar Hussain, (8.) Adnan Maqsood, (9.) Tariq Aziz, (10.) Rehan Butt, (11.) Muhammad Shabbir, (12.) Nasir Ahmed, (14.) Mudassar Ali Khan, (15.) Shakeel Abbasi, (16.) Imran Khan Yousafzai, (17.) Muhammad Zakir, (19.) Muhammad Imran, (22.) Zeeshan Ashraf, and (29.) Muhammad Zubair. Head coach: Asif Bajwa.

=== Trinidad and Tobago ===
(1.) Glenn Francis, (2.) Ron Alexander, (3.) Akim Toussaint, (4.) Damian Gordon, (5.) Nicholas da Costa, (6.) Solomon Eccles, (7.) Kwandwane Browne, (8.) Nigel Providence, (9.) Atiba Whittington, (10.) Wayne Legerton, (11.) Nel Lashley, (12.) Nicholas Wren, (13.) Dwain Quan Chan, (14.) Dillet Gilkes, (15.) Calvin Alexander, and (16.) Darren Cowie. Head coach: David Francois.
