= Field hockey at the 2008 Summer Olympics – Men's team squads =

Twelve national teams competed in the Men's Olympic Hockey Tournament at the 2008 Summer Olympics in Beijing, China. Sixteen players were officially enrolled in each squad. Two reserve players could also be nominated to be available should a player enrolled in the official squad become injured during the tournament. Official squad lists were released by the FIH on 24 July 2008.

== Pool A ==
=== Belgium ===
The following is the Belgian roster in the men's field hockey tournament of the 2008 Summer Olympics.

Head Coach: Adam Commens

1. Cédric de Greve (GK)
2. Xavier Reckinger
4. Thierry Renaer
5. Jérôme Dekeyser
6. Loïc Vandeweghe (c)
7. John-John Dohmen
8. Thomas van den Balck
9. Maxime Luycx
10. Cédric Charlier
11. Charles Vandeweghe
14. Philippe Goldberg
15. Gregory Gucassoff
17. Thomas Briels
18. Patrice Houssein
19. Félix Denayer
28. Jérôme Truyens

Reserve:

21. David van Rysselberghe (GK)
23. Alexandre de Saedeleer

=== China ===
The following is the Chinese roster in the men's field hockey tournament of the 2008 Summer Olympics.

Head Coach: Kim Sang-Ryul

1. Sun Tianjun
6. Luo Fangming
7. De Yunze
8. Jiang Xishang
9. Song Yi (c)
10. Li Wei
12. Meng Xuguang
15. Liu Xiantang
16. Meng Lizhi
17. Hu Liang
18. Meng Jun
19. Yu Yang
20. Na Yubo
25. Su Rifeng (GK)
27. Tao Zhinan (GK)
32. Hu Huiren

Reserve:

11. Lu Fenghui
29. Ao Changrong

=== Germany ===
The following is the German roster in the men's field hockey tournament of the 2008 Summer Olympics.

Head Coach: Markus Weise

3. Philip Witte
4. Maximilian Müller
5. Sebastian Biederlack
7. Carlos Nevado
9. Moritz Fürste
13. Tobias Hauke
14. Tibor Weißenborn
15. Benjamin Weß
16. Niklas Meinert
17. Timo Weß (c)
18. Oliver Korn
19. Christopher Zeller
21. Max Weinhold (GK)
22. Matthias Witthaus
23. Florian Keller
25. Philipp Zeller

Reserve:

2. Christian Schulte
10. Jan-Marco Montag

=== New Zealand ===
The following is the New Zealand roster in the men's field hockey tournament of the 2008 Summer Olympics.

Head Coach: Shane McLeod

3. David Kosoof
6. Simon Child
7. Blair Hopping
8. Dean Couzins
9. Casey Henwood
10. Ryan Archibald (c)
12. Bradley Shaw
16. Paul Woolford (GK)
17. Kyle Pontifex (GK)
18. Phil Burrows
19. Hayden Shaw
20. James Nation
24. Gareth Brooks
25. Shea McAleese
30. Benjamin Collier
31. Steve Edwards

Reserve:

28. Richard Petherick
32. Nick Wilson

=== South Korea ===
The following is the South Korean roster in the men's field hockey tournament of the 2008 Summer Olympics.

Head Coach: Cho Myung-jun

1. Ko Dong-sik (GK)
2. Kim Byung-hoon
3. Kim Chul
5. Kim Yong-bae
6. Lee Nam-yong
7. Seo Jong-ho (c)
8. Kang Seong-jung
9. Yoon Sung-hoon
10. You Hyo-sik
11. Yeo Woon-kon
15. Cha Jong-bok
16. Lee Myung-ho (GK)
17. Hong Eun-seong
19. Kang Moon-kweon
22. Kim Sam-seok
25. Jang Jong-hyun

Reserve:

12. Lee Jae-won
14. Hyun Hye-sung

=== Spain ===
The following is the Spanish roster in the men's field hockey tournament of the 2008 Summer Olympics.

Head Coach: Maurits Hendriks

1. Francisco Cortes (GK)
2. Santi Freixa
5. Francisco Fábregas (c)
6. Víctor Sojo
8. Alexandre Fabregas
9. Pablo Amat
10. Eduardo Tubau
11. Roc Oliva
12. Juan Fernandez
13. Ramón Alegre
16. Xavier Ribas
17. Albert Sala
18. Rodrigo Garza
20. Sergi Enrique
21. Eduard Arbos
23. David Alegre

Reserve:

3. Franc Dinares
22. Xavier Castillano (GK)

== Pool B ==
=== Australia ===
The following is the Australian roster in the men's field hockey tournament of the 2008 Summer Olympics.

Head Coach: Barry Dancer

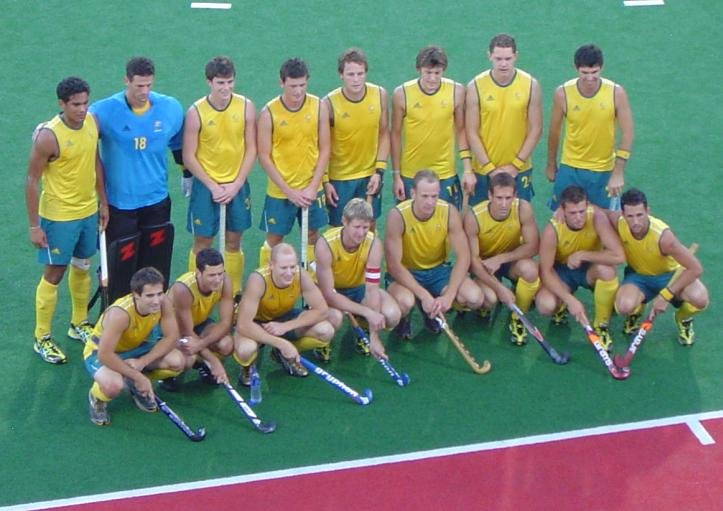
Australia's team just before the group stage match against Pakistan. Standing from the left: Abbott, Lambert, Kavanagh, Matheson, Guest, Ockenden, Brooks, Wells. Front row from the left: Brown, Dwyer, Hammond, George, Doerner, de Young, Schubert, Knowles.

1. Jamie Dwyer
2. Liam de Young
6. Robert Hammond
9. Mark Knowles
11. Eddie Ockenden
12. David Guest
13. Luke Doerner
14. Grant Schubert
15. Bevan George (c)
18. Stephen Lambert (GK)
19. Eli Matheson
23. Matthew Wells
24. Travis Brooks
28. Kiel Brown
31. Fergus Kavanagh
32. Des Abbott

Reserve:

17. Andrew Smith
30. Stephen Mowlam (GK)

=== Canada ===
The following is the Canadian roster in the men's field hockey tournament of the 2008 Summer Olympics.

Head Coach: Louis Mendonca

2. Mike Mahood (GK)
3. Anthony Wright
4. Scott Tupper
6. Marian Schole
9. Ken Pereira
10. Wayne Fernandes
11. Peter Short
13. Rob Short (c)
16. Scott Sandison
17. Connor Grimes
18. Paul Wettlaufer
19. Mark Pearson
20. Ranjeev Deol
21. Ravinder Kahlon
23. Bindi Kullar
24. Gabbar Singh

Reserve:

8. Philip Wright
30. David Carter (GK)

=== Great Britain ===
The following is the British roster in the men's field hockey tournament of the 2008 Summer Olympics.

Head Coach: Jason Lee

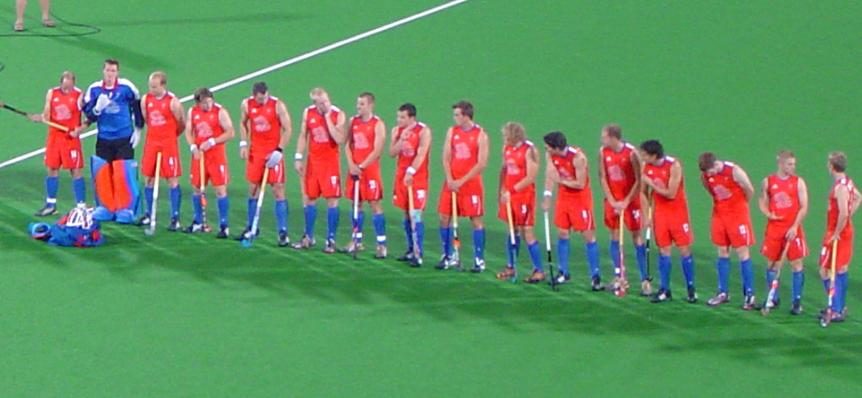
Great Britain's team just before the group stage match against South Africa. From the left: Hawes, McGregor, Kirkham, Dick, R. Mantell, Wilson, Bleby, Tindall, Daly, Alexander, S. Mantell, Marsden, Moore, Clarke, Jackson, Middleton.

1. Alistair McGregor (GK)
4. Glenn Kirkham
5. Richard Alexander
6. Richard Mantell
7. Ashley Jackson
8. Simon Mantell
9. Stephen Dick
10. Matt Daly
12. Jonty Clarke
13. Rob Moore
14. Ben Hawes (c)
17. Alastair Wilson
18. Barry Middleton
20. James Tindall
21. Jon Bleby
24. Ben Marsden

Reserve:

16. Niall Stott
25. James Fair (GK)

=== Netherlands ===
The following is the Dutch roster in the men's field hockey tournament of the 2008 Summer Olympics.

Head Coach: Roelant Oltmans

1. Guus Vogels (GK)
3. Geert-Jan Derikx
5. Rob Derikx
6. Thomas Boerma
7. Sander van der Weide
8. Ronald Brouwer
9. Roderick Weusthof
10. Taeke Taekema
11. Laurence Docherty
12. Jeroen Delmee (c)
14. Teun de Nooijer
18. Rob Reckers
19. Matthijs Brouwer
20. Jeroen Hertzberger
23. Timme Hoyng
24. Robert van der Horst

Reserve:

26. Jaap Stockmann (GK)
27. Rogier Hofman

=== Pakistan ===
The following is the Pakistani roster in the men's field hockey tournament of the 2008 Summer Olympics.

Head Coach: Naveed Alam

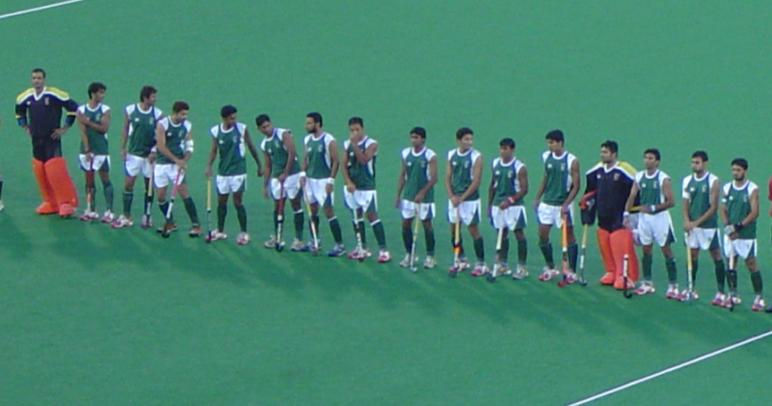
Pakistan's team just before the group stage match against Australia. From the left: S. Akbar, Bilgrami, Saqlain, Warsi, Zubair, Imran, Abbasi, Rana, Rasool, W. Akbar, Javed, Waqas, Ahmed, Maqsood, Butt, Ashraf.

1. Salman Akbar (GK)
2. Zeeshan Ashraf (c)
3. Muhammad Imran
4. Muhammad Javed
5. Muhammad Saqlain
6. Adnan Maqsood
7. Muhammad Waqas
8. Waqas Akbar
9. Shakeel Abbasi
10. Rehan Butt
11. Syed Abbas Haider Bilgrami
12. Nasir Ahmed (GK)
13. Syed Imran Ali Warsi
14. Muhammad Asif Rana
15. Muhammad Zubair
16. Shafqat Rasool

Reserve:

- Muddasir Abbas
- Shabbir Ahmed Khan

=== South Africa ===
The following is the South African roster in the men's field hockey tournament of the 2008 Summer Olympics.

Head Coach: Gregg Clark

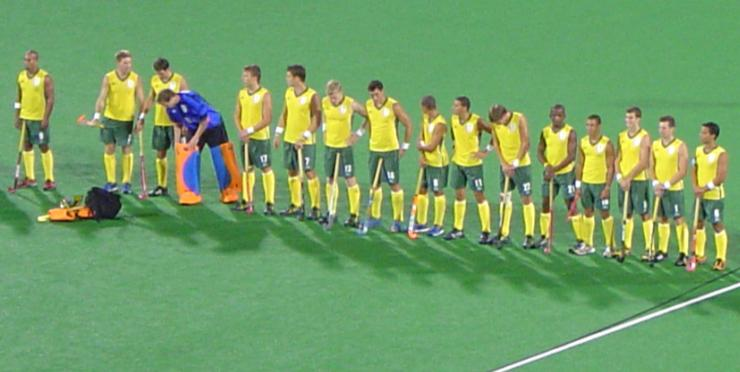
South Africa's team just before the group stage match against Great Britain. From the left: E. Smith, Symons, McDade, Hibbert, Abbott, Gallagher, Blake, Rose-Innes, Harper, Abrahams, Hammond, Tsolekile, Bam, A. Smith, Cronje, Jacobs

1. Andrew Cronje
2. Ian Symons
5. Austin Smith
6. Bruce Jacobs (c)
7. Darryn Gallagher
8. Marvin Harper
9. Emile Smith
11. Clyde Abrahams
13. Paul Blake
14. Eric Rose-Innes
16. Marvin Bam
17. Geoffrey Abbott
18. Thornton McDade
19. Chris Hibbert (GK)
21. Lungile Tsolekile
22. Thomas Hammond

Reserve:

20. Shanyl Balwanth
23. Erasmus Pieterse (GK)
