= 2010 Men's Hockey World Cup squads =

This article lists the squads for the 2010 Men's Hockey World Cup, held between 28 February – 13 March 2010 in New Delhi, India

== Pool A ==
=== Argentina ===
Head coach: Pablo Lombi

No.	Player	Pos.	Age
3	Ignacio Ricardo Bergner		25
4	Matias Vila (c)		30
5	Pedro Ibarra		24
7	Mario Almada		34
8	Lucas Rey		27
10	Matías Paredes		28
12	Lucas Vila		23
14	Fernando Zylberberg		32
15	Joaquin Gonzalez Rothberg	GK	26

No.	Player	Pos.	Age
17	Juan Martín Lopez		24
20	Tomás Argento		23
22	Matias Rey		25
23	Juan Espinosa	GK	24
24	Manuel Brunet		24
26	Agustin Mazzilli		20
27	Lucas Rossi		24
28	Facundo Callioni		28
30	Matias Vila		30

=== Canada ===
Head coach: Alan Brahmst

No.	Player	Pos.	Age
1	Matt Peck	GK	29
3	Philip Wright		23
4	Scott Tupper		23
6	Jesse Watson		23
7	Richard Hildreth		25
9	Ken Pereira (c)		36
10	Wayne Fernandes		31
12	David Jameson		25
13	Rob Short		37

No.	Player	Pos.	Age
16	Scott Sandison		31
17	Connor Grimes		26
18	Paul Wettlaufer		32
19	Mark Pearson		22
20	Ranjeev Deol		20
21	Keegan Pereira		18
24	Gabbar Singh		31
29	Taylor Curran		17
30	David Carter	GK	28

=== Germany ===
Head coach: Markus Weise

No.	Player	Pos.	Age
3	Philip Witte		25
4	Maximillian Müller (c)		22
5	Florian Woesch		22
6	Martin Häner		21
7	Oskar Deecke		23
9	Moritz Fürste		25
10	Jan-Marco Montag		26
11	Christoph Menke		25
13	Tobias Hauke		22

No.	Player	Pos.	Age
14	Jan Philipp Rabente		22
15	Benjamin Wess		24
17	Linus Butt		23
18	Oliver Korn		25
20	Martin Zwicker		23
21	Max Weinhold	GK	27
22	Matthias Witthaus		27
23	Florian Fuchs		18
31	Tim Jessulat	GK	30

=== Netherlands ===
Head coach: Michel van den Heuvel

No.	Player	Pos.	Age
1	Guus Vogels	GK	34
2	Jaap Stockmann	GK	25
3	Geert-Jan Derikx		29
4	Klaas Vermeulen		22
5	Marcel Balkestein		29
7	Wouter Jolie		24
8	Ronald Brouwer		30
10	Taeke Taekema		30
12	Robbert Kemperman		19

No.	Player	Pos.	Age
14	Teun de Nooijer (c)		33
16	Floris Evers		27
18	Rob Reckers		28
20	Jeroen Hertzberger		24
21	Teun Rohof		24
22	Rogier Hofman		23
24	Robert van der Horst		25
26	Valentin Verga		25
28	Billy Bakker		21

=== New Zealand ===
Head coach: Shane McLeod

No.	Player	Pos.	Age
3	Joseph Bartholomew		21
4	Nick Haig		23
5	Andy Hayward		24
7	Blair Hopping		29
8	Dean Couzins		28
10	Ryan Archibald		29
11	Priyesh Bhana		2
13	Blair Hilton		20
15	Stephen Graham	GK	24

No.	Player	Pos.	Age
17	Kyle Pontifex	GK	30
18	Phil Burrows (c)		29
24	Arun Panchia		20
25	Shea McAleese		25
28	Richard Petherick		23
29	Hugo Inglis		19
30	Ben Collier		25
31	Steve Edwards		24
32	Nick Wilson		19

=== Korea ===
Head coach: Seok Kyo Shin

No.	Player	Pos.	Age
1	Lee Myung-Ho	GK	30
2	Lee Seung-Il		27
5	Nam Hyun-Woo		22
6	Lee Nam-Yong		26
7	Seo Jong-Ho (c)		29
8	Jeong Yun-Sang		21
9	Yoon Sung-Hoon		27
10	You Hyo-Sik		27
11	Yang Soo-Hyuk		31

No.	Player	Pos.	Age
12	Jin Kyung-Min		30
13	Kang Moon-Kweon		21
14	Hyun Hye-Sung		23
15	Kang Moon-Kyu		21
16	Kim Jae-Hyeon	GK	22
17	Hong Eun-Seong		27
19	Kim Young-Jin		25
22	Kim Seong-Kyu		23
32	Jang Jong-Hyun		25

== Pool B ==
=== Australia ===
Head coach: Ric Charlesworth

No.	Player	Pos.	Age
1	Jamie Dwyer (c)		31
2	Liam de Young		28
3	Simon Orchard		23
4	Glenn Turner		25
6	Robert Hammond		28
8	Matthew Butturini		22
9	Mark Knowles		26
11	Eddie Ockenden		22
13	Luke Doerner		30

No.	Player	Pos.	Age
14	Grant Schubert		29
20	Matthew Swann		20
22	Nathan Burgers	GK	30
26	George Bazeley	GK	26
27	Kieran Govers		22
28	Kiel Brown		25
29	Graeme Begbie		24
31	Fergus Kavanagh		24
32	Desmond Abbott		24

=== England ===
Head coach: Jason Lee

No.	Player	Pos.	Age
3	Nick Brothers	GK	26
4	Glenn Kirkham		27
5	Richard Alexander		28
6	Richard Mantell		28
7	Ashley Jackson		22
11	Alastair Brogdon		22
12	Jonty Clarke		29
13	Robert Moore		28
14	Ben Hawes		29

No.	Player	Pos.	Age
16	Adam Dixon		23
17	Alastair Wilson		26
18	Barry Middleton (c)		26
20	James Tindall		26
23	Iain Mackay		24
25	James Fair	GK	29
26	Nicholas Catlin		20
27	Daniel Fox		26
29	Richard Smith		22

=== India ===
Head coach: Jose Brasa

No.	Player	Pos.	Age
1	Adrian D'Souza	GK	25
4	Sandeep Singh		24
5	Arjun Halappa		29
7	Prabhjot Singh		29
8	Sardar Singh		23
9	Gurwinder Singh Chandi		20
10	Deepak Thakur		29
11	Sarwanjit Singh		21
13	Gurbaj Singh		21

No.	Player	Pos.	Age
14	Tushar Khandker		24
15	Rajpal Singh (c)		26
16	P. R. Sreejesh	GK	21
18	Shivendra Singh		26
22	Bharat Chikara		23
25	Dhananjay Mahadik		25
27	Vikram Pillay		28
29	Danish Mujtaba		21
32	Diwakar Ram		20

=== Pakistan ===
Head coach: Shahid Ali Khan

No.	Player	Pos.	Age
1	Salman Akbar	GK	28
3	Sohail Abbas		34
4	Sajjad Anwar		24
5	Muhammad Imran		31
6	Waseem Ahmed		32
7	Muhammad Irfan		19
8	Muhammad Rashid		17
9	Fareed Ahmed		20
10	Zeeshan Ashraf (c)		33

No.	Player	Pos.	Age
11	Muhammad Rizwan		20
12	Abdul Haseem Khan		19
13	Nasir Ahmed	GK	25
14	Akhtar Ali		26
15	Abbas Haider		20
16	Rehan Butt		29
17	Muhammad Umar Bhutta		17
18	Muhammad Zubair		21
19	Shakeel Abbasi		26

=== South Africa ===
Head coach: Gregg Clark

No.	Player	Pos.	Age
1	Jonathan Robinson		23
2	Wade Paton		23
4	Lloyd Madsen		23
5	Austin Smith (c)		24
6	Marvin Harper		24
10	Lloyd Norris-Jones		24
12	Gareth Carr		28
13	Paul Blake		26
14	Rhett Halkett		23

No.	Player	Pos.	Age
18	Thornton McDade		29
19	Julian Hykes		27
20	Shanyl Balwanth		24
22	Tommy Hammond		25
23	Erasmus Pieterse	GK	23
25	Justin Reid-Ross		23
29	Ian Haley		26
30	Taine Paton		21
32	Brenden Botes	GK	27

=== Spain ===
Head coach: Dani Martin

No.	Player	Pos.	Age
1	Francisco Cortés	GK	26
3	Sergi Enrique		22
5	Bosco Pérez-Pla		22
7	Miguel Delas		25
8	Alex Fàbregas		29
9	Pol Amat (c)		31
10	Eduard Tubau		29
11	Roc Oliva		20
13	Ramón Alegre		28

No.	Player	Pos.	Age
15	Juan Lainz		24
16	Xavier Ribas		34
17	Albert Sala		28
18	Rodrigo Garza		30
20	Xavi Castillano	GK	28
23	David Alegre		25
25	Pau Quemada		26
26	Andres Mir		23
28	Xavi Lleonart		19
