= Field hockey at the 2007 Pan American Games =

- Venue: Círculo Militar Deodoro
- Dates: July 15 – July 25
- Competitors: 256 from 8 nations

Field hockey at the 2007 Pan American Games in Rio de Janeiro was held over a ten-day period beginning on July 15 and culminating with the medal finals on July 24 and July 25. All games were played at the Círculo Militar Deodoro. Each team was allowed to enter a maximum of sixteen athletes. The winner of each tournament qualified to compete at the 2008 Summer Olympics in Beijing, China.

Argentina were the reigning Pan American Games champions in both the men's and women's competitions. The men failed to defend their title, losing to Canada 5–4 in a penalty shoot-out in the final. The women defeated the United States 4–2 in the final, winning the tournament for the 6th time.

== Medal summary ==
=== Medal table ===
Rank	Nation	Gold	Silver	Bronze	Total
1	Argentina	1	1	0	2
2	Canada	1	0	0	1
3	United States	0	1	0	1
4	Chile	0	0	1	1
4	Netherlands Antilles	0	0	1	1
Totals (5 entries)		2	2	2	6

=== Events ===
Event	Gold	Silver	Bronze
Men	Canada; Ranjeev Deol; Wayne Fernandes; Connor Grimes; David Jameson; Ranvinder Kahlon; Michael Mahood; Matthew Peck; Ken Pereira; Scott Sandison; Marian Schole; Peter Short; Rob Short; Sukhwinder Singh; Scott Tupper; Paul Wettlaufer; Anthony Wright	Argentina; Mario Almada; Lucas Argento Innocente; Tomás Argento Innocente; Ignacio Bergner; Mariano Chao; Juan Ignacio Gilardi; Pedro Ibarra; Jorge Lombi; Matías Paredes; Lucas Rey; Matías Rey; Lucas Rossi; Lucas Vila; Rodrigo Vila; Juan Manuel Vivaldi; Fernando Zylberberg	Chile; Matias Amoroso; Mathias Anwandter; Felipe Casanova; Thomas Kannegeisser; Sebastian Kapsch; Ian Koppenberger; Esteban Krainz; Pablo Kuhlenthal; Luis Felipe Montegu; Cristobal Rodriguez; Mauro Scaff; Martín Sotomayor; Alan Stien; Alfredo Thiermann; Gabriel Thiermann; Matias Vogel
Women	Argentina; Gabriela Aguirre; Magdalena Aicega; Luciana Aymar; Noel Barrionuevo; Agustina Bouza; Claudia Burkart; Mariana González Oliva; Alejandra Gulla; Giselle Kañevsky; Rosario Luchetti; Daniela Maloberti; Mercedes Margalot; Carla Rebecchi; Marine Russo; Belen Succi; Paola Vukojicic	United States; Kate Barber; Kayla Bashore; Lauren Crandall; Rachel Dawson; Sarah Dawson; Kelly Doton; Katelyn Falgowski; Michelle Kasold; Melissa Leonetti; Carrie Lingo; Angela Loy; Lauren Powley; Dana Sensenig; Keli Smith; Tiffany Snow; Amy Tran	Netherlands Antilles; Anika de Haas; Anne Maaike Elsen; Jamaine Festen; Maria Hinskens; Floortje Joosten; Ilse Luirink; Theresia Noorlander; Juliette Plantenga; Pauline Roels; Ernestina Schreuder; Marlieke van de Pas; Sanne van Donk; Sophie van Noort; Nienke van Ruiten; Kiona Wellens; Eva Wiedijk

== Men's tournament ==
=== Qualification ===
Date	Event	Location	Quotas	Qualifier(s)
Host nation			1	Brazil
21–28 April 2004	2004 Pan American Cup	Bridgetown, Barbados	2	Canada; Netherlands Antilles
20–29 July 2006	2006 Central American and Caribbean Games	Santo Domingo, Dominican Republic	2	Cuba; Trinidad and Tobago
9–19 November 2006	2006 South American Games	Buenos Aires, Argentina	2	Argentina; Chile
8–11 March 2007	Qualification Event	Hamilton, Bermuda	1	United States
Total			8	

=== Preliminary round ===
==== Pool A ====
Pos	Team	Pld	W	D	L	GF	GA	GD	Pts	Qualification
1	Argentina	3	3	0	0	30	1	+29	9	Semi-finals
2	Trinidad and Tobago	3	2	0	1	11	9	+2	6	Semi-finals
3	Cuba	3	1	0	2	10	6	+4	3	
4	Brazil (H)	3	0	0	3	1	36	−35	0	

Source: PAHF
Rules for classification: 1) points; 2) goal difference; 3) goals scored; 4) head-to-head result.
(H) Hosts

==== Pool B ====
Pos	Team	Pld	W	D	L	GF	GA	GD	Pts	Qualification
1	Canada	3	2	1	0	6	2	+4	7	Semi-finals
2	Chile	3	2	0	1	4	4	0	6	Semi-finals
3	Netherlands Antilles	3	1	0	2	3	5	−2	3	
4	United States	3	0	1	2	4	6	−2	1	

Source: PAHF
Rules for classification: 1) points; 2) goal difference; 3) goals scored; 4) head-to-head result.

=== Classification round ===
==== Fifth to eighth place classification ====
Crossover
22 July 2007
Cuba	4
United States	1
22 July 2007
Netherlands Antilles	8
Brazil	0

Fifth place
25 July 2007
United States	1
Brazil	0
Seventh place
25 July 2007
Netherlands Antilles	1
Cuba	3

==== First to fourth place classification ====
Semi-finals
22 July 2007
Argentina	5
Chile	2
22 July 2007
Canada (a.e.t)	4
Trinidad and Tobago	3

Final
25 July 2007
Argentina	2 (4)
Canada (p.s.o)	2 (5)
Third place
25 July 2007
Chile	5
Trinidad and Tobago	3

=== Final standings ===
Rank	Team
Gold medal	Canada
Silver medal	Argentina
Bronze medal	Chile
4	Trinidad and Tobago
5	Cuba
6	Netherlands Antilles
7	United States
8	Brazil

Qualified for the Summer Olympics

== Women's tournament ==
=== Qualification ===
Date	Event	Location	Quotas	Qualifier(s)
Host nation			1	Brazil
21–28 April 2004	2004 Pan American Cup	Bridgetown, Barbados	3	Canada; United States; Uruguay
20–29 July 2006	2006 Central American and Caribbean Games	Santo Domingo, Dominican Republic	2	Cuba; Netherlands Antilles
9–19 November 2006	2006 South American Games	Buenos Aires, Argentina	2	Argentina; Chile
Total			8	

=== Preliminary round ===
==== Pool A ====
Pos	Team	Pld	W	D	L	GF	GA	GD	Pts	Qualification
1	Argentina	3	3	0	0	29	1	+28	9	Semi-finals
2	Chile	3	2	0	1	16	2	+14	6	Semi-finals
3	Uruguay	3	1	0	2	8	12	−4	3	
4	Brazil (H)	3	0	0	3	0	38	−38	0	

Source: PAHF
Rules for classification: 1) points; 2) goal difference; 3) goals scored; 4) head-to-head result.
(H) Hosts

==== Pool B ====
Pos	Team	Pld	W	D	L	GF	GA	GD	Pts	Qualification
1	United States	3	3	0	0	17	1	+16	9	Semi-finals
2	Netherlands Antilles	3	1	1	1	2	4	−2	4	Semi-finals
3	Cuba	3	1	1	1	3	8	−5	4	
4	Canada	3	0	0	3	1	10	−9	0	

Source: PAHF
Rules for classification: 1) points; 2) goal difference; 3) goals scored; 4) head-to-head result.

=== Classification round ===
==== Fifth to eighth place classification ====
Crossover
21 July 2007
Uruguay	0
Canada	3
21 July 2007
Cuba	7
Brazil	0

Fifth place
24 July 2007
Canada	3
Cuba	2
Seventh place
24 July 2007
Uruguay	8
Brazil	0

==== First to fourth place classification ====
Semi-finals
21 July 2007
Argentina	3
Netherlands Antilles	0
21 July 2007
United States	4
Chile	1

Final
24 July 2007
Argentina	4
United States	2
Third place
24 July 2007
Netherlands Antilles (a.e.t)	2
Chile	1

=== Final standings ===
Rank	Team
Gold medal	Argentina
Silver medal	United States
Bronze medal	Netherlands Antilles
4	Chile
5	Canada
6	Cuba
7	Uruguay
8	Brazil

Qualified for the Summer Olympics
