= Great Britain at the 2008 Summer Olympics =

- Flag of the United Kingdom
- IOC code: GBR
- NOC: British Olympic Association

in Beijing
- Competitors: 313 in 20 sports
- Flag bearers: Mark Foster (opening); Chris Hoy (closing)
- Officials: 236
- Medals Ranked 4th: Gold 19 Silver 13 Bronze 19 Total 51

Summer Olympics appearances (overview)
- 1896; 1900; 1904; 1908; 1912; 1920; 1924; 1928; 1932; 1936; 1948; 1952; 1956; 1960; 1964; 1968; 1972; 1976; 1980; 1984; 1988; 1992; 1996; 2000; 2004; 2008; 2012; 2016; 2020; 2024; 2028

Other related appearances
- 1906 Intercalated Games

Great Britain competed at the 2008 Summer Olympics in Beijing, China. The United Kingdom was represented by the British Olympic Association (BOA), one of only five National Olympic Committees to have competed in every modern Summer Olympic Games since the inaugural event in 1896. The team of athletes selected to compete for the UK was officially known as Team GB; the delegation of 549 consisted of 313 competitors (169 men and 144 women) accompanied by 236 officials. The team incorporated athletes from the whole of the UK, including Northern Ireland (whose citizens may be selected to represent either Great Britain or Ireland at the Olympics if they have elected to hold Irish citizenship). Additionally, three of the British Overseas Territories compete separately from Britain in Olympic competition, namely Bermuda, the British Virgin Islands and the Cayman Islands.

Great Britain's Olympic medal performance in 2008 was its best in a century; at the close of the Games, the overall medal count of 47 was the second highest ever achieved by Team GB. The total number of gold medals was the highest since the 1908 Summer Olympics, which Britain hosted in London. Following the retesting of samples in 2016 in connection with the Russian doping scandal, disqualifications led to four further bronze medals being awarded to Great Britain in athletics: both the men's and women's 4 × 400 metres relay teams were officially upgraded to bronze; Kelly Sotherton received her second reallocated bronze medal, in the women's heptathlon event (having also been part of the women's relay team); and Goldie Sayers was awarded the bronze medal for the women's javelin throw event. These four additional medals retrospectively increased Team GB's total medal count to 51.

Great Britain finished fourth overall in the Olympic medal table, a target that had previously been set by UK Sport (the public body responsible for distributing funding to elite sport) for the 2012 Summer Olympics, which was hosted by the UK in London; after Team GB's success in 2008, UK Sport considered whether to target third place for 2012. Team GB finished top of the medal tables in cycling, sailing and rowing, and third in swimming. The highest number of medals was won in cycling, with a total of 14, eight of which were gold. Britain also won gold medals in sailing, rowing, swimming, athletics, canoeing and boxing. There were several outstanding individual achievements: cyclist Chris Hoy was the first Briton in 100 years to win three gold medals at a single Olympic Games; Rebecca Adlington's double Olympic gold was the best performance by a British swimmer for a century; Ben Ainslie won a gold medal for the third successive Games to become the most decorated British Olympic sailor of all time; Rebecca Romero became the first British woman to win a medal in two different Olympic sports, winning a rowing silver in 2004 and a cycling gold in 2008; and Louis Smith was the first Briton to win an individual gymnastics medal since 1908.

As the UK was to host the 2012 Summer Olympics in London, the closing ceremony on 24 August included a London 2012 handover performance featuring football star David Beckham, singer Leona Lewis and musician Jimmy Page, as well as London mayor Boris Johnson and a London double-decker bus.

== Medals ==
At the close of the Games, Great Britain had won a total of 47 medals, 19 of which were gold. This was the second highest medal haul ever achieved by Team GB and the highest in a century, representing the team's best Olympic performance since the 1908 Summer Olympics, which Britain hosted in London. Great Britain finished fourth overall in the Olympics medal table, behind China, United States and Russia.

The following British competitors won medals at the Games (in August 2008). Note that the names of the Team GB medallists are shown in bold in the results tables given for each discipline in the sections below.

Medal	Name	Sport	Event	Day	Date
Gold	Nicole Cooke	Cycling	Women's road race	2	10 August
Gold	Rebecca Adlington	Swimming	Women's 400 m freestyle	3	11 August
Gold	Chris Hoy; Jason Kenny; Jamie Staff	Cycling	Men's team sprint	7	15 August
Gold	Rebecca Adlington	Swimming	Women's 800 m freestyle	8	16 August
Gold	Tom James; Andy Hodge; Pete Reed; Steve Williams	Rowing	Men's coxless four	8	16 August
Gold	Bradley Wiggins	Cycling	Men's individual pursuit	8	16 August
Gold	Chris Hoy	Cycling	Men's keirin	8	16 August
Gold	Sarah Ayton; Sarah Webb; Pippa Wilson	Sailing	Yngling class	9	17 August
Gold	Mark Hunter; Zac Purchase	Rowing	Men's lightweight double sculls	9	17 August
Gold	Ben Ainslie	Sailing	Finn class	9	17 August
Gold	Rebecca Romero	Cycling	Women's individual pursuit	9	17 August
Gold	Ed Clancy; Paul Manning; Geraint Thomas; Bradley Wiggins	Cycling	Men's team pursuit	10	18 August
Gold	Paul Goodison	Sailing	Men's Laser class	11	19 August
Gold	Victoria Pendleton	Cycling	Women's sprint	11	19 August
Gold	Chris Hoy	Cycling	Men's sprint	11	19 August
Gold	Christine Ohuruogu	Athletics	Women's 400 m	11	19 August
Gold	Iain Percy; Andrew Simpson	Sailing	Men's Star class	13	21 August
Gold	Tim Brabants	Canoeing	Men's K-1 1000 m	14	22 August
Gold	James DeGale	Boxing	Middleweight	15	23 August
Silver	David Florence	Canoeing	Men's slalom C-1	4	12 August
Silver	Emma Pooley	Cycling	Women's road time trial	5	13 August
Silver	Ross Edgar	Cycling	Men's keirin	8	16 August
Silver	Debbie Flood; Katherine Grainger; Frances Houghton; Annie Vernon	Rowing	Women's quadruple sculls	9	17 August
Silver	Wendy Houvenaghel	Cycling	Women's individual pursuit	9	17 August
Silver	Richard Egington; Alastair Heathcote; Matt Langridge; Tom Lucy; Acer Nethercott (cox); Alex Partridge; Colin Smith; Tom Stallard; Josh West	Rowing	Men's eight	9	17 August
Silver	Jonathan Glanfield; Nick Rogers	Sailing	Men's 470	10	18 August
Silver	Jason Kenny	Cycling	Men's sprint	11	19 August
Silver	Germaine Mason	Athletics	Men's high jump	11	19 August
Silver	Keri-Anne Payne	Swimming	Women's 10 km open water	12	20 August
Silver	David Davies	Swimming	Men's 10 km open water	13	21 August
Silver	Phillips Idowu	Athletics	Men's triple jump	13	21 August
Silver	Heather Fell	Modern pentathlon	Women's modern pentathlon	14	22 August
Bronze	Joanne Jackson	Swimming	Women's 400 m freestyle	3	11 August
Bronze	Tina Cook; Daisy Dick; William Fox-Pitt; Sharon Hunt; Mary King	Equestrian	Team eventing	4	12 August
Bronze	Tina Cook	Equestrian	Individual eventing	4	12 August
Bronze	Anna Bebington; Elise Laverick	Rowing	Women's double sculls	8	16 August
Bronze	Stephen Rowbotham; Matthew Wells	Rowing	Men's double sculls	8	16 August
Bronze	Chris Newton	Cycling	Men's points race	8	16 August
Bronze	Steven Burke	Cycling	Men's individual pursuit	8	16 August
Bronze*	Kelly Sotherton	Athletics	Women's heptathlon	8	16 August
Bronze	Louis Smith	Gymnastics	Men's pommel horse	9	17 August
Bronze	Cassandra Patten	Swimming	Women's 10 km open water	12	20 August
Bronze	Bryony Shaw	Sailing	Women's RS:X	12	20 August
Bronze	Tasha Danvers	Athletics	Women's 400 m hurdles	12	20 August
Bronze*	Goldie Sayers	Athletics	Women's javelin throw	13	21 August
Bronze	Tony Jeffries	Boxing	Light heavyweight	14	22 August
Bronze	David Price	Boxing	Super heavyweight	14	22 August
Bronze	Tim Brabants	Canoeing	Men's K-1 500 m	15	23 August
Bronze*	Michael Bingham; Andrew Steele; Robert Tobin; Martyn Rooney	Athletics	Men's 4 x 400 metres relay	15	23 August
Bronze	Sarah Stevenson	Taekwondo	Women's +67 kg	15	23 August
Bronze*	Christine Ohuruogu; Kelly Sotherton; Marilyn Okoro; Nicola Sanders	Athletics	Women's 4 x 400 metres relay	15	23 August

Medals by discipline
Discipline	1st place, gold medalist(s)	2nd place, silver medalist(s)	3rd place, bronze medalist(s)	Total
Cycling	8	4	2	14
Sailing	4	1	1	6
Rowing	2	2	2	6
Swimming	2	2	2	6
Athletics	1	2	5	8
Canoeing	1	1	1	3
Boxing	1	0	2	3
Modern pentathlon	0	1	0	1
Equestrian	0	0	2	2
Gymnastics	0	0	1	1
Taekwondo	0	0	1	1
Total	19	13	19*	51

Medals by date
**Day**	**Date**	1st place, gold medalist(s)	2nd place, silver medalist(s)	3rd place, bronze medalist(s)	Total
1	9 Aug	0	0	0	0
2	10 Aug	1	0	0	1
3	11 Aug	1	0	1	2
4	12 Aug	0	1	2	3
5	13 Aug	0	1	0	1
6	14 Aug	0	0	0	0
7	15 Aug	1	0	0	1
8	16 Aug	4	1	5	10
9	17 Aug	4	3	1	8
10	18 Aug	1	1	0	2
11	19 Aug	4	2	0	6
12	20 Aug	0	1	3	4
13	21 Aug	1	2	1	4
14	22 Aug	1	1	2	4
15	23 Aug	1	0	4	5
16	24 Aug	0	0	0	0
Total		19	13	19*	51

* The original bronze medal count for Team GB was 15. Between July 2017 and July 2019, four bronze medals were awarded retrospectively in Athletics (see medal table left), bringing the total up to 19.

=== Multiple medallists ===
The following British competitors won multiple medals at the 2008 Olympic Games.

Name	Medal	Sport	Event
Chris Hoy	Gold; Gold; Gold	Cycling	Men's team sprint Men's keirin Men's sprint
Bradley Wiggins	Gold; Gold	Cycling	Men's individual pursuit Men's team pursuit
Rebecca Adlington	Gold; Gold	Swimming	Women's 400 m freestyle Women's 800 m freestyle
Jason Kenny	Gold; Silver	Cycling	Men's team sprint Men's sprint
Tim Brabants	Gold; Bronze	Canoeing	Men's K-1 1000 m Men's K-1 500 m
Christine Ohuruogu	Gold; Bronze	Athletics	Women's 400 metres Women's 4 × 400 metres relay
Tina Cook	Bronze; Bronze	Equestrian	Team eventing Individual eventing
Kelly Sotherton	Bronze; Bronze	Athletics	Women's heptathlon Women's 4 × 400 metres relay

== Medal targets ==
UK Sport, which distributes National Lottery funding to elite sport, published its expectations for the Beijing Olympics in June 2008. The target medal count was set at 41 "potential" medals, with 35 of those identified as "expected" to be won, including 10 to 12 gold medals. Team GB's overall objective was to finish eighth in the medal table.

The gold medal expectation was exceeded on 19 August when Paul Goodison earned Britain's 13th gold medal in the men's Laser class sailing event. The expectation of 35 medals was passed on 20 August when Team GB claimed their 36th medal – a bronze in the women's RS:X sailing event, won by Bryony Shaw. The overall medal target of 41 was achieved when canoeist Tim Brabants took gold in the men's 1000 m K-1 canoeing event, claiming Britain's 41st physical medal (three further medals were guaranteed in boxing at the time), and the target was exceeded when Heather Fell secured the 42nd medal, a silver, in the women's modern pentathlon.

Not all of the medals claimed had been identified and included in the target medal count; although Team GB fell short of targets in some disciplines, they exceeded targets in others. For example, the cycling target of six medals was met twice over on 19 August when Victoria Pendleton won Britain's 12th cycling medal, a gold in the women's sprint event. A further two medals were already guaranteed at this stage in the men's individual sprint: Chris Hoy and Jason Kenny subsequently won gold and silver, respectively. Altogether, Team GB won seven of the ten gold medals available in the track cycling events at the velodrome. The swimmers also doubled their targeted medal count when David Davies won the team's sixth swimming medal – a silver in the men's 10 km open water marathon on 21 August. Despite the men's and women's archery teams having placed second and third, respectively, at the 2007 world championships, the British archers won neither of their targeted medals, leading to criticism of the tactics used by head coach Peter Suk from members of the team.

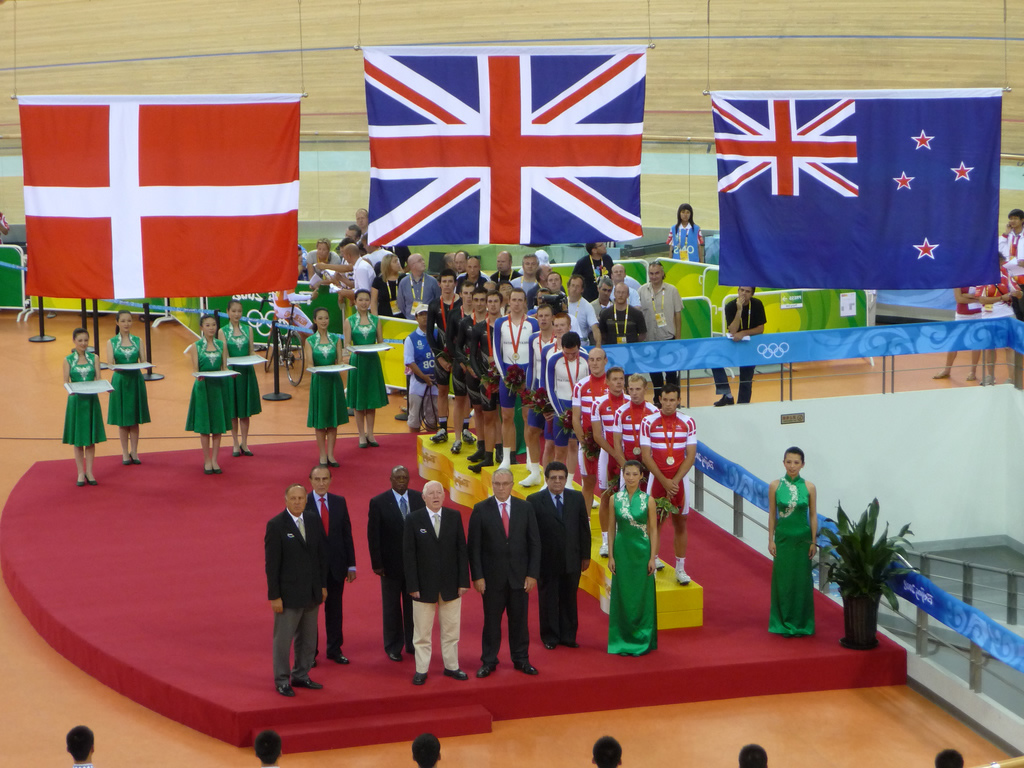
Medal ceremony for the men's team pursuit event, Laoshan Velodrome, 18 August 2008

Sport	Target	Won	Target met
Archery	2	0	✗
Athletics	5	8	✓
Badminton	1	0	✗
Boxing	2	3	✓
Canoeing	2	3	✓
Cycling	6	14	✓
Diving	1	0	✗
Equestrian	3	2	✗
Gymnastics (artistic)	1	1	✓
Judo	2	0	✗
Modern pentathlon	1	1	✓
Rowing	4	6	✓
Sailing	4	6	✓
Shooting	2	0	✗
Swimming	3	6	✓
Taekwondo	1	1	✓
Triathlon	1	0	✗
Total	41	51	✓
Total expected	35	51	✓
Total gold	12	19	✓

== Archery ==
At the 2007 World Outdoor Target Championships, Great Britain's men's team placed second and its women's team placed third. This qualified the nation to send the maximum quota of three men and three women to the 2008 Olympics.

Men

Athlete	Event	Ranking round		Round of 64	Round of 32	Round of 16	Quarterfinals	Semi-finals	Final / BM	
Athlete	Event	Score	Seed	Opposition Score	Opposition Score	Opposition Score	Opposition Score	Opposition Score	Opposition Score	Rank
Laurence Godfrey	Individual	657	34	Badënov (RUS) (31); L 109–114	Did not advance					
Simon Terry	Individual	670	7	Hatava (FIN) (58); L 104–105	Did not advance					
Alan Wills	Individual	661	21	Nespoli (ITA) (44); W 103–98	Galiazzo (ITA) (12); W 110–109	Stevens (CUB) (28); L 104–108	Did not advance			
Laurence Godfrey; Simon Terry; Alan Wills	Team	1998	5	—N/a		China (12); L 210–214	Did not advance			

Women

Athlete	Event	Ranking round		Round of 64	Round of 32	Round of 16	Quarterfinals	Semi-finals	Final / BM	
Athlete	Event	Score	Seed	Opposition Score	Opposition Score	Opposition Score	Opposition Score	Opposition Score	Opposition Score	Rank
Charlotte Burgess	Individual	623	40	Guo D (CHN) (25); W 106–104	Folkard (GBR) (8); L 96–110	Did not advance				
Naomi Folkard	Individual	651	8	Abed Elaal (EGY) (57); W 107–95	Burgess (GBR) (40); W 110–96	Hayakawa (JPN) (9); L 97–106	Did not advance			
Alison Williamson	Individual	651	7	Wei P-H (TPE) (58); W 108–99	Lorig (USA) (26); L 108–112	Did not advance				
Charlotte Burgess; Naomi Folkard; Alison Williamson	Team	1925	2	—N/a		Bye	Japan (7); W 201–196	China (3); L 202–208	France (5); L 201–203	4

== Athletics ==
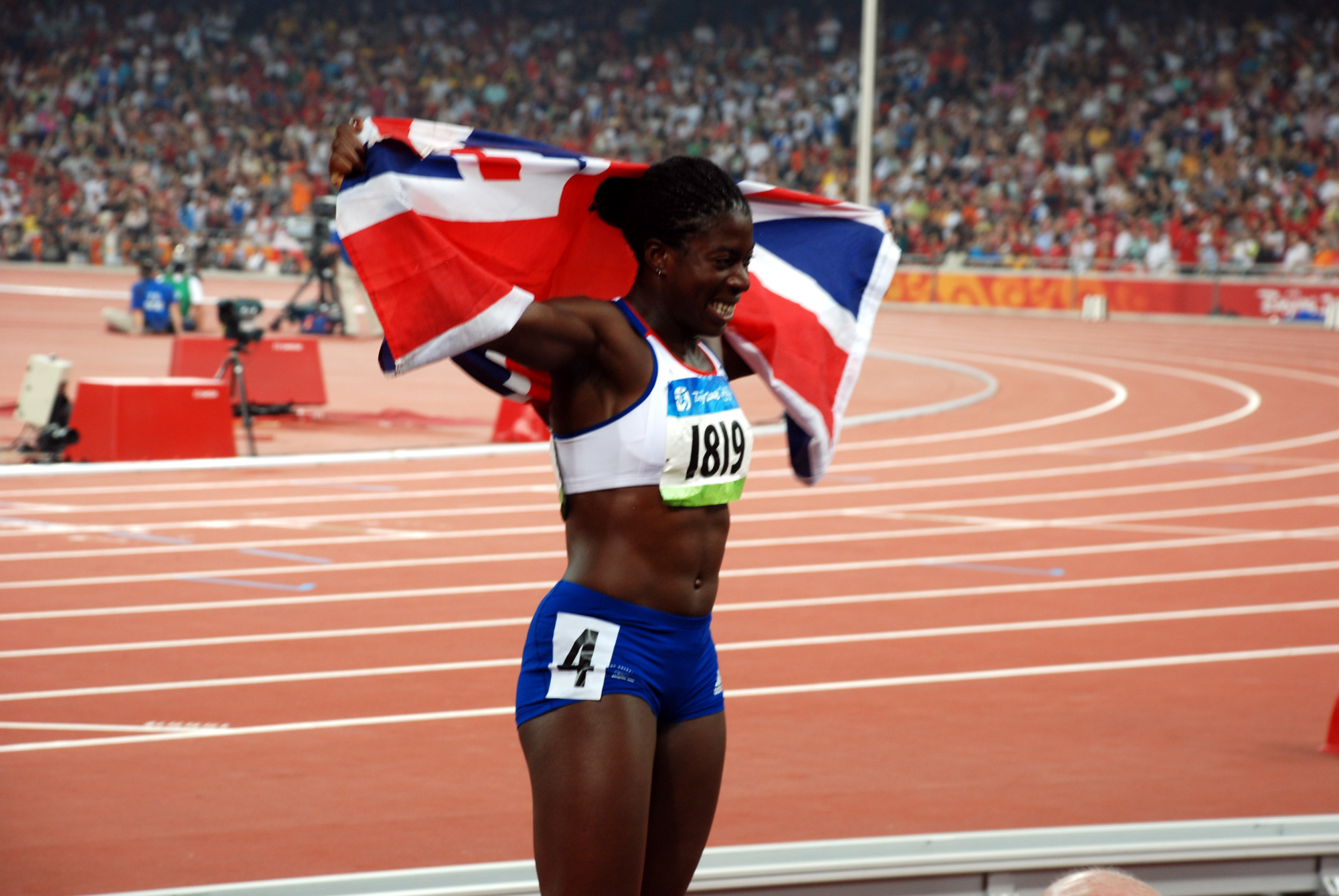
Christine Ohuruogu after winning the women's 400 metres event

The initial squad was selected for the British team on 14 July; however, the final team was not confirmed until the outcome of a court case involving Dwain Chambers. Under BOA rules, Chambers had been banned from future Games after testing positive for the steroid THG in 2003; his appeal to overturn the ban (on the grounds that it was an unfair "restraint of trade") failed, and he was omitted from the squad. The athletics team included former Olympic medal winners Marlon Devonish and Kelly Sotherton, as well as former Olympic individual finalists Joanne Pavey, Paula Radcliffe, Helen Clitheroe and Tasha Danvers. Women's marathon world record holder Paula Radcliffe faced a battle to be fit for the Games because of a stress fracture in her left thigh. She was eventually fit enough to start the race but struggled to complete the distance and finished in 23rd position.

Team GB won four medals in athletics: one gold, two silver and one bronze. UK Athletics performance director Dave Collins was forced to stand down from his post after the Games, due in part to the team's failure to meet the UK Sport target of winning five medals. Subsequently, a series of retests ordered in the wake of the Russian doping scandal in 2015 and 2016 found that Britain had been deprived of medals in a further four events by athletes later confirmed to have committed doping violations at the 2008 Games. In September 2016, javelin thrower Goldie Sayers and the entire Men's 4 × 400 metres relay team were upgraded to bronze after confirmation that their Russian rivals had been retrospectively stripped of their medals for failing retests for banned substances. Two further disqualifications resulting from the retest of doping samples led to the Women's 4 × 400 metres relay team being upgraded from fifth place to bronze medal position. In September 2018, Kelly Sotherton was awarded a retrospective individual bronze medal in the women's heptathlon (her second reallocated bronze, as she was also part of the upgraded relay team)—having originally placed fifth, she had been promoted to fourth position a few days after the event when Ukraine's Liudmyla Blonska was immediately stripped of her silver medal for failing a drugs test.

Key

- Note: Ranks given for track events are in the athlete's heat only.
- Q = Qualified for the next round
- q = Qualified for the next round as a fastest loser or, in field events, by position without achieving the qualifying target
- NR = National record
- N/A = Round not applicable for the event
- Bye = Athlete not required to compete in round

Men
Track & road events

Athlete	Event	Heat		Quarter-final		Semi-final		Final	
Athlete	Event	Result	Rank	Result	Rank	Result	Rank	Result	Rank
Tyrone Edgar	100 m	10.13	1 Q	10.10	3 Q	10.18	7	Did not advance	
Craig Pickering	100 m	10.21	3 Q	10.18	5	Did not advance			
Simeon Williamson	100 m	10.42	3 Q	10.32	4	Did not advance			
Marlon Devonish	200 m	20.49	1 Q	20.43	4 Q	20.57	7	Did not advance	
Christian Malcolm	200 m	20.42	2 Q	20.30	4 Q	20.25	4 Q	20.40	5
Alex Nelson	200 m	Withdrew (hamstring injury)							
Martyn Rooney	400 m	45.00	1 Q	—N/a		44.60	2 Q	45.12	6
Andrew Steele	400 m	44.94	1 Q	—N/a		45.59	7	Did not advance	
Michael Rimmer	800 m	1:47.61	1 Q	—N/a		1:48.07	6	Did not advance	
Andrew Baddeley	1500 m	3:36.47	3 Q	—N/a		3:37.47	3 Q	3:35.37	8
Thomas Lancashire	1500 m	3:43.40	7	—N/a		Did not advance			
Mo Farah	5000 m	13:50.95	6	—N/a				Did not advance	
Allan Scott	110 m hurdles	13.56	3 Q	13.66	6	Did not advance			
Andy Turner	110 m hurdles	13.56	2 Q	13.53	5	Did not advance			
Andrew Lemoncello	3000 m steeplechase	8:36.06	10	—N/a				Did not advance	
Marlon Devonish; Tyrone Edgar; Craig Pickering; Simeon Williamson	4 × 100 m relay	DSQ		—N/a				Did not advance	
Michael Bingham; Richard Buck*; Dale Garland*; Martyn Rooney; Andrew Steele; Rob Tobin	4 × 400 m relay	2:59.33	1 Q	—N/a				2:58.81	3rd place, bronze medalist(s)
Dan Robinson	Marathon	—N/a						2:16:14	24

* Qualified for the team, but did not compete in any of the rounds

Field events

Athlete	Event	Qualification		Final	
Athlete	Event	Distance	Position	Distance	Position
Greg Rutherford	Long jump	8.16	3 Q	7.84	10
Chris Tomlinson	Long jump	7.70	27	Did not advance	
Larry Achike	Triple jump	17.18	7 Q	17.17	7
Nathan Douglas	Triple jump	16.72	20	Did not advance	
Phillips Idowu	Triple jump	17.44	1 Q	17.62	2nd place, silver medalist(s)
Martyn Bernard	High jump	2.29	=6 Q	2.25	9
Germaine Mason	High jump	2.29	=1 Q	2.34	2nd place, silver medalist(s)
Tom Parsons	High jump	2.25	12 Q	2.25	8
Steve Lewis	Pole vault	NM	—	Did not advance	

Combined events – Decathlon

Athlete	Event	100 m	LJ	SP	HJ	400 m	110H	DT	PV	JT	1500 m	Final	Rank
Daniel Awde	Result	11.06	7.12	12.03	1.78	47.16	14.69	37.12	4.90	53.10	4:44.80	7516	20
Daniel Awde	Points	847	842	608	610	950	887	606	880	636	650	7516	20

Women
Track & road events

Athlete	Event	Heat		Quarter-final		Semi-final		Final	
Athlete	Event	Result	Rank	Result	Rank	Result	Rank	Result	Rank
Montell Douglas	100 m	11.36	2 Q	11.38	4	Did not advance			
Jeanette Kwakye	100 m	11.30	2 Q	11.18	3 Q	11.19	3 Q	11.14	6
Laura Turner	100 m	11.65	4	Did not advance					
Emily Freeman	200 m	22.95	2 Q	22.95	3 Q	22.83	7	Did not advance	
Lee McConnell	400 m	51.87	3 Q	—N/a		52.11	6	Did not advance	
Christine Ohuruogu	400 m	51.00	1 Q	—N/a		50.14	1 Q	49.62	1st place, gold medalist(s)
Nicola Sanders	400 m	51.81	2 Q	—N/a		50.71	4	Did not advance	
Jennifer Meadows	800 m	2:00.33	3 Q	—N/a		1:59.43	6	Did not advance	
Marilyn Okoro	800 m	1:59.01	2 Q	—N/a		1:59.53	6	Did not advance	
Jemma Simpson	800 m	2:02.16	4	—N/a		Did not advance			
Lisa Dobriskey	1500 m	4:03.22	3 Q	—N/a				4:02.10	4
Susan Scott	1500 m	4:14.66	4	—N/a				Did not advance	
Stephanie Twell	1500 m	4:06.68	6	—N/a				Did not advance	
Jo Pavey	5000 m	Withdrew (sickness)							
Jo Pavey	10000 m	—N/a						31:12.30	12
Kate Reed	10000 m	—N/a						32:26.69	23
Sarah Claxton	100 m hurdles	12.97	3 Q	—N/a		12.84	4 Q	12.94	8
Tasha Danvers	400 m hurdles	55.19	1 Q	—N/a		54.31	2 Q	53.84	3rd place, bronze medalist(s)
Helen Clitheroe	3000 m steeplechase	9:29.14 NR	6	—N/a				Did not advance	
Barbara Parker	3000 m steeplechase	9:51.93	12	—N/a				Did not advance	
Emma Ania; Montell Douglas; Emily Freeman; Jeanette Kwakye; Ashleigh Nelson*; Anyika Onuora*; Laura Turner*	4 × 100 m relay	43.02	2 Q	—N/a				DNF	
Vicki Barr*; Donna Fraser*; Lee McConnell*; Christine Ohuruogu; Marilyn Okoro; Nicola Sanders; Kelly Sotherton	4 × 400 m relay	3:25.48	3 Q	—N/a				3:22.68	3rd place, bronze medalist(s)
Paula Radcliffe	Marathon	—N/a						2:32:38	23
Mara Yamauchi	Marathon	—N/a						2:27:29	6
Liz Yelling	Marathon	—N/a						2:33:12	26
Johanna Jackson	20 km walk	—N/a						1:31:33 NR	22

* Qualified for the team, but did not compete in any of the rounds

Field events

Athlete	Event	Qualification		Final	
Athlete	Event	Distance	Position	Distance	Position
Jade Johnson	Long jump	6.61	11 q	6.64	7
Kate Dennison	Pole vault	4.40	15	Did not advance	
Philippa Roles	Discus throw	57.44	27	Did not advance	
Zoe Derham	Hammer throw	64.74	35	Did not advance	
Goldie Sayers	Javelin throw	62.99	5 Q	65.75 NR	3rd place, bronze medalist(s)

Combined events – Heptathlon

Athlete	Event	100H	HJ	SP	200 m	LJ	JT	800 m	Final	Rank
Julie Hollman	Result	14.43	1.77	12.45	25.41	6.13	39.08	2:22.54	5729	31*
Julie Hollman	Points	918	941	691	850	890	650	789	5729	31*
Kelly Sotherton	Result	13.18	1.83	13.87	23.39	6.33	37.66	2:07.34	6517	3rd place, bronze medalist(s)
Kelly Sotherton	Points	1097	1016	785	1040	953	622	1004	6517	3rd place, bronze medalist(s)

* The athlete who finished in second place, Lyudmila Blonska of Ukraine, failed an initial drugs test immediately after the event. She was stripped of her silver medal on 22 August 2008 when both her A and B samples tested positive for a banned substance, and both British heptathletes were moved up a position.

== Badminton ==
Six British badminton players went to the Games, competing in four of the five badminton events. They did not win any medals, thus failing to reach the one medal target set by UK Sport. The mixed doubles pairing of Gail Emms and Nathan Robertson, who won silver in the 2004 tournament, progressed furthest amongst the British athletes, reaching the quarterfinals.

Athlete	Event	Round of 64	Round of 32	Round of 16	Quarterfinal	Semi-final	Final / BM	
Athlete	Event	Opposition Score	Opposition Score	Opposition Score	Opposition Score	Opposition Score	Opposition Score	Rank
Andrew Smith	Men's singles	Koukal (CZE); W 10–21, 21–12, 21–15	Zwiebler (GER); L 16–21, 21–13, 21–17	Did not advance				
Tracey Hallam	Women's singles	Yip P Y (HKG); W 21–15, 21–17	Ludíková (CZE); W 21–18, 21–13	Xu Hw (GER); L 7–21, 10–21	Did not advance			
Gail Emms; Donna Kellogg	Women's doubles	—N/a		Chien Y C / Cheng W H (TPE); L 19–21, 13–21	Did not advance			
Anthony Clark; Donna Kellogg	Mixed doubles	—N/a		He Hb / Yu Y (CHN); L 15–21, 8–21	Did not advance			
Gail Emms; Nathan Robertson	Mixed doubles	—N/a		Zheng B / Gao L (CHN); W 21–16, 16–21, 21–19	Lee Y-d / Lee H-j (KOR); L 19–21, 12–21	Did not advance		

== Boxing ==
Great Britain qualified eight entrants for the boxing competition. David Price and Tony Jeffries won bronze medals in the super heavyweight and light heavyweight divisions, respectively, and James DeGale won gold in the middleweight class. This was the first time since 1972 that Team GB had won more than one boxing medal in a single Olympic Games, and it was Britain's best result in Olympic boxing since 1956.

Athlete	Event	Round of 32	Round of 16	Quarterfinals	Semi-finals	Final	
Athlete	Event	Opposition Result	Opposition Result	Opposition Result	Opposition Result	Opposition Result	Rank
Khalid Yafai	Flyweight	Bye	Laffita (CUB); L 3–9	Did not advance			
Joe Murray	Bantamweight	Yu G (CHN); L 7–17	Did not advance				
Frankie Gavin	Lightweight	Withdrew (failed to make weight)					
Bradley Saunders	Light welterweight	Neequaye (GHA); W 24–1 KO	Vastine (FRA); L 7–11	Did not advance			
Billy Joe Saunders	Welterweight	Kılıççı (TUR); W 14–3	Banteaux (CUB); L 6–13	Did not advance			
James DeGale	Middleweight	Hikal (EGY); W 13–4	Estrada (USA); W 11–5	Artayev (KAZ); W 8–3	Sutherland (IRL); W 10–3	Correa (CUB); W 16–14	1st place, gold medalist(s)
Tony Jeffries	Light heavyweight	Bye	Alvarez (COL); W 5^{+}–5	Szello (HUN); W 10–2	Egan (IRL); L 3–10	Did not advance	3rd place, bronze medalist(s)
David Price	Super heavyweight	—N/a	Timurziev (RUS); W RSC	Jakšto (LTU); W 3–1	Cammarelle (ITA); L 1–11	Did not advance	3rd place, bronze medalist(s)

== Canoeing ==
Seven competitors joined Team GB for the canoeing events, with three in the slalom and four in the flatwater sprint. Anna Hemmings and Jessica Walker, in the K-2 kayaking pairs, were a late addition to the team after qualification complications with the Spanish team. Three medals were won, exceeding the target of two set by UK Sport. Two of the medals were won by sprint kayaker Tim Brabants, who had previously won a bronze at the 2000 Olympics in Sydney.

=== Slalom ===
Athlete	Event	Preliminary						Semi-final		Final			
Athlete	Event	Run 1	Rank	Run 2	Rank	Total	Rank	Time	Rank	Time	Rank	Total	Rank
David Florence	Men's C-1	89.47	7	82.16	1	171.63	3 Q	90.46	4 Q	89.43	2	178.61	2nd place, silver medalist(s)
Campbell Walsh	Men's K-1	86.72	14	85.72	8	172.44	9 Q	95.74	16	Did not advance			
Fiona Pennie	Women's K-1	160.06	19	99.00	7	259.06	17	Did not advance					

=== Sprint ===
Athlete	Event	Heats		Semi-finals		Final	
Athlete	Event	Time	Rank	Time	Rank	Time	Rank
Tim Brabants	Men's K-1 500 m	1:36.338	1 QS	1:42.530	3 Q	1:37.671	3rd place, bronze medalist(s)
Tim Brabants	Men's K-1 1000 m	3:27.828	1 QF	Bye		3:26.323	1st place, gold medalist(s)
Lucy Wainwright	Women's K-1 500 m	1:50.103	3 QS	1:52.580	2 Q	1:53.102	7
Anna Hemmings; Jessica Walker	Women's K-2 500 m	1:47.435	9	Did not advance			

Qualification Legend: QS = Qualify to semi-final; QF = Qualify directly to final

== Cycling ==
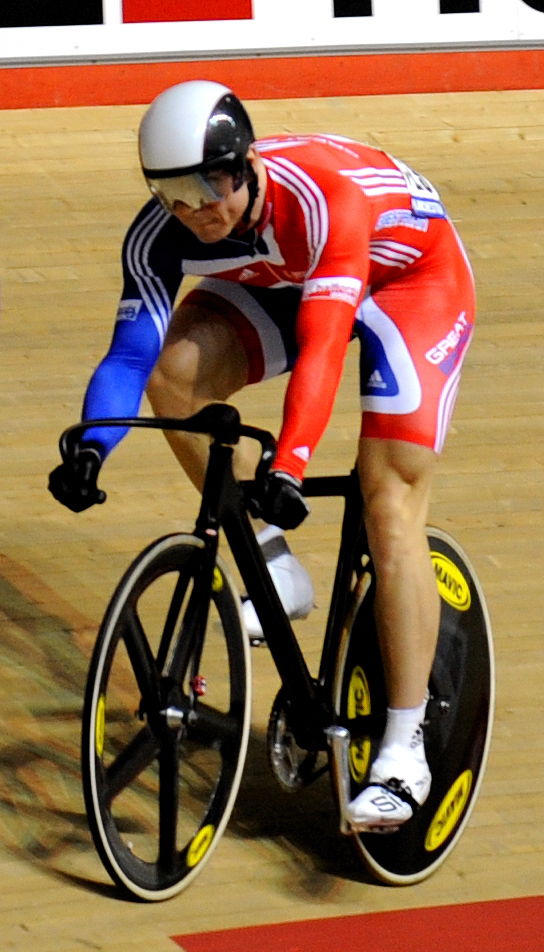
Triple gold medallist Chris Hoy

Team GB's cycling squad for Beijing totalled twenty-five entrants in the four disciplines. Included were two reigning Olympic track cycling champions, Chris Hoy and Bradley Wiggins, plus a further two medal winners from 2004, as well as several reigning track world champions. Great Britain won a total of fourteen cycling medals (eight gold, four silver and two bronze) to top the cycling medal table. Britain's Olympic cycling team won the 2008 BBC Sports Team of the Year Award and received a nomination for Laureus World Team of the Year.

On the track, Mark Cavendish was the only member of the squad of fourteen not to win at least one medal. Chris Hoy became Scotland's most successful Olympic competitor ever, and the first Briton to win three gold medals at a single Olympic Games since Henry Taylor in 1908. Hoy was named the 2008 BBC Sports Personality of the Year, and his medal success resulted in the velodrome for the 2014 Commonwealth Games in Glasgow being named in his honour. Rebecca Romero became the first British woman to win a medal in two different Olympic sports by following her silver medal in the quadruple sculls rowing in 2004 with gold in the women's individual pursuit.

In the debut appearance of BMX events at the Olympics, world champion Shanaze Reade finished out of the medals after crashing out of the women's final. Reade had been unbeaten all year and was the favourite to win the women's title.

On the road, Nicole Cooke won the women's road race, providing the first Olympic gold for an athlete from Wales since Richard Meade in 1972.

=== Road ===
Men

Athlete	Event	Time	Rank
Jonathan Bellis	Road race	Did not finish	
Steve Cummings	Road race	Did not finish	
Steve Cummings	Time trial	1:05:07	11
Roger Hammond	Road race	Did not finish	
Ben Swift	Road race	Did not finish	

Women

Athlete	Event	Time	Rank
Nicole Cooke	Road race	3:32:24	1st place, gold medalist(s)
Nicole Cooke	Time trial	37:14.25	15
Sharon Laws	Road race	3:33:17	35
Emma Pooley	Road race	3:32:55	23
Emma Pooley	Time trial	35:16.01	2nd place, silver medalist(s)

=== Track ===
Great Britain was represented by 14 track cyclists, 13 of whom won at least one medal. Seven of the ten gold medals available in the track cycling discipline went to Team GB.

Sprint

Athlete	Event	Qualification		Round 1	Round 2	Quarterfinals	Semi-finals	Final	
Athlete	Event	Time Speed (km/h)	Rank	Opposition Time Speed (km/h)	Opposition Time Speed (km/h)	Opposition Time Speed (km/h)	Opposition Time Speed (km/h)	Opposition Time Speed (km/h)	Rank
Chris Hoy	Men's sprint	9.815 OR; 73.357	1 Q	Dmitriev (RUS); W 10.607; 67.879	Watanabe (JPN); W 10.636; 67.694	Awang (MAS); W 10.820, W 10.302	Bourgain (FRA); W 10.260, W 10.358	Kenny (GBR); W 12.228, W 10.216	1st place, gold medalist(s)
Jason Kenny	Men's sprint	9.857; 73.044	2 Q	Kwiatkowski (POL); W 10.672; 67.466	Awang (MAS); W 10.531; 68.369	Sireau (FRA); W 10.546, W 10.595	Levy (GER); W 10.594, W 10.335	Hoy (GBR); L, L	2nd place, silver medalist(s)
Victoria Pendleton	Women's sprint	10.963 OR; 65.675	1 Q	Tsukuda (JPN); W 11.736; 61.349	—N/a	Krupeckaitė (LTU); W 11.839, W 11.672	Kanis (NED); W 11.537, W 11.885	Meares (AUS); W 11.363, W 11.118	1st place, gold medalist(s)
Chris Hoy; Jason Kenny; Jamie Staff	Men's team sprint	42.950; 62.863	1 Q	United States; W 43.034; 62.741	—N/a			France; W 43.128; 62.604	1st place, gold medalist(s)

Pursuit

Athlete	Event	Qualification		Semi-finals		Finals	
Athlete	Event	Time	Rank	Opponent Results	Rank	Opponent Results	Rank
Steven Burke	Men's individual pursuit	4:22.260	5 Q	Dyudya (UKR); 4:21.558	3 Q	Markov (RUS); 4:20.947	3rd place, bronze medalist(s)
Bradley Wiggins	Men's individual pursuit	4:15.031 OR	1 Q	Serov (RUS); 4:16.571	1 Q	Roulston (NZL); 4:16.977	1st place, gold medalist(s)
Wendy Houvenaghel	Women's individual pursuit	3:28.443 NR	1 Q	Kozlíková (CZE); 3:27.829	2 Q	Romero (GBR); 3:30.395	2nd place, silver medalist(s)
Rebecca Romero	Women's individual pursuit	3:28.641	2 Q	Mactier (AUS); 3:27.703 NR	1 Q	Houvenaghel (GBR); 3:28.321	1st place, gold medalist(s)
Ed Clancy; Paul Manning; Geraint Thomas; Bradley Wiggins	Men's team pursuit	3:57.101	1 Q	Russia; 3:55.202 WR	1 Q	Denmark; 3:53.314 WR	1st place, gold medalist(s)

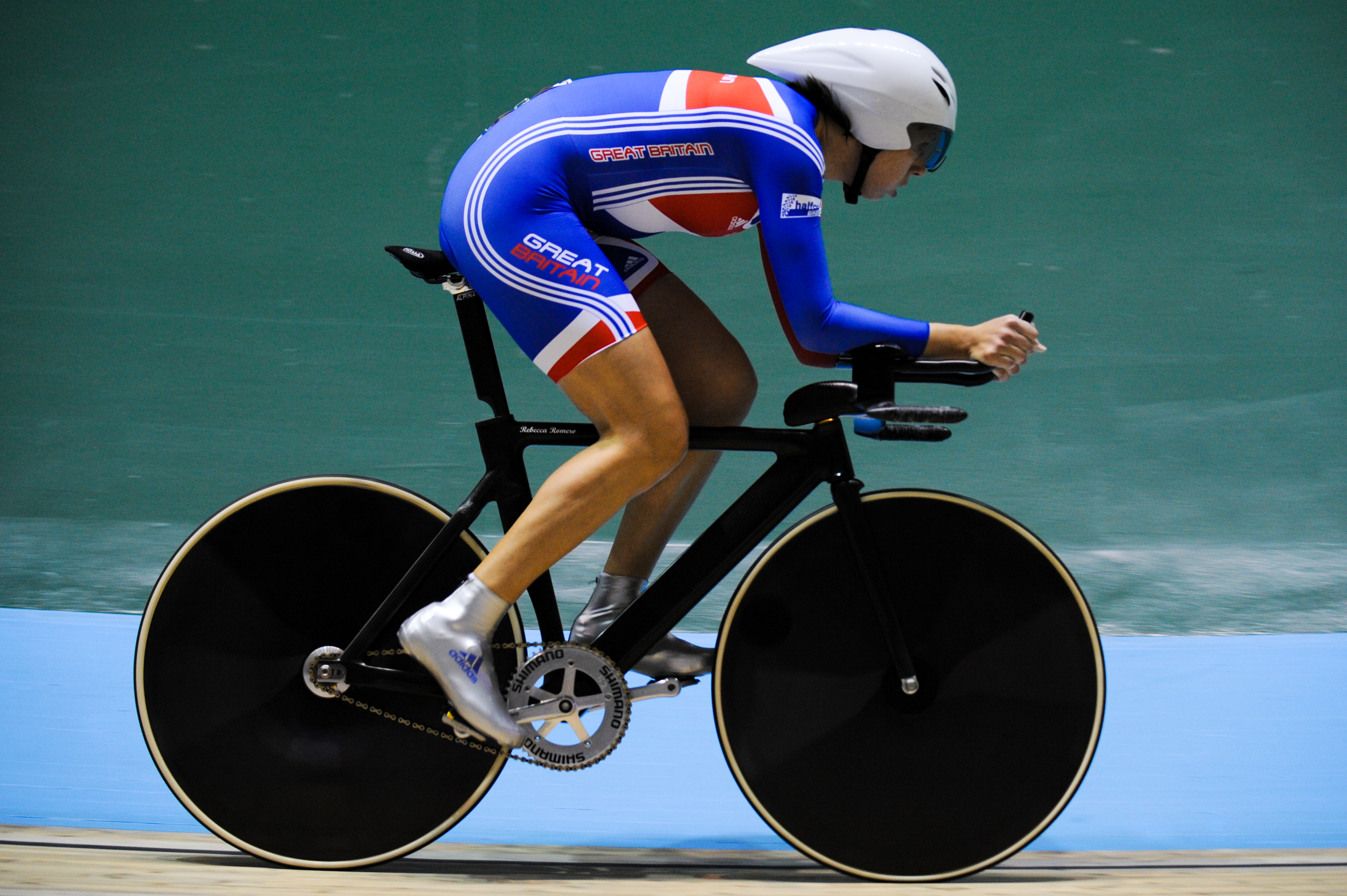
Rebecca Romero won gold in the individual pursuit, four years after winning silver in the quadruple sculls rowing event at the 2004 Games.

Keirin

Athlete	Event	1st round	Repechage	2nd round	Finals
Athlete	Event	Rank	Rank	Rank	Rank
Ross Edgar	Men's keirin	1 Q	Bye	1 Q	2nd place, silver medalist(s)
Chris Hoy	Men's keirin	1 Q	Bye	1 Q	1st place, gold medalist(s)

Omnium

Athlete	Event	Points	Laps	Rank
Chris Newton	Men's points race	56	2	3rd place, bronze medalist(s)
Rebecca Romero	Women's points race	3	0	11
Mark Cavendish; Bradley Wiggins	Men's madison	6	−1	9

=== Mountain biking ===
Athlete	Event	Time	Rank
Oli Beckingsale	Men's cross-country	2:01:25	12
Liam Killeen	Men's cross-country	2:00:14	7

=== BMX ===
Athlete	Event	Seeding		Quarter-finals		Semi-finals		Final	
Athlete	Event	Result	Rank	Points	Rank	Points	Rank	Result	Rank
Liam Phillips	Men's BMX	37.392	28	18	7	Did not advance			
Shanaze Reade	Women's BMX	36.882	2	—N/a		10	5	REL	8

== Diving ==
Team GB entered a total of ten divers (five men and five women) into the individual and synchronised diving events. The diving team included 14-year-old Tom Daley, the 2008 European Men's 10-metre platform champion and one of the youngest athletes ever to compete for Great Britain at the Summer Olympics.

Men

Athlete	Events	Preliminaries		Semi-finals		Final	
Athlete	Events	Points	Rank	Points	Rank	Points	Rank
Ben Swain	3 m springboard	390.30	26	Did not advance			
Tom Daley	10 m platform	440.40	12 Q	458.60	8 Q	463.55	7
Peter Waterfield	10 m platform	497.65	4 Q	430.95	13	Did not advance	
Nick Robinson-Baker; Ben Swain	3 m synchronised springboard	—N/a				402.36	7
Blake Aldridge; Tom Daley	10 m synchronised platform	—N/a				408.48	8

Women

Athlete	Events	Preliminaries		Semi-finals		Final	
Athlete	Events	Points	Rank	Points	Rank	Points	Rank
Rebecca Gallantree	3 m springboard	232.75	25	Did not advance			
Tonia Couch	10 m platform	320.40	12 Q	297.20	12 Q	328.70	8
Stacie Powell	10 m platform	313.90	14 Q	301.75	11 Q	303.50	10
Tandi Gerrard; Hayley Sage	3 m synchronised springboard	—N/a				278.25	8
Tonia Couch; Stacie Powell	10 m synchronised platform	—N/a				303.48	8

== Equestrian ==
Twelve entrants competed for Team GB in the three equestrian disciplines, which took place in Hong Kong. Zara Phillips, the reigning world eventing champion and granddaughter of Queen Elizabeth II, was originally included in the squad but had to withdraw when her horse Toytown sustained an injury during training; Phillips missed out on her second successive Olympics, having withdrawn from the 2004 Games for the same reason.

Kristina Cook won an individual eventing bronze medal, and Britain also won bronze in the three-day team event.

=== Dressage ===
Athlete	Horse	Event	Grand Prix		Grand Prix Special		Grand Prix Freestyle		Overall	
Athlete	Horse	Event	Score	Rank	Score	Rank	Score	Rank	Score	Rank
Laura Bechtolsheimer	Mistral Hojris	Individual	65.917	24 Q	67.160	18	Did not advance			
Jane Gregory	Lucky Star	Individual	63.375	31	Did not advance					
Emma Hindle	Lancet 2	Individual	71.125	4 Q	70.440	9 Q	74.250	6	72.345	7
Laura Bechtolsheimer; Jane Gregory; Emma Hindle	See above	Team	66.805	7	—N/a				66.805	6

(Total scores are the average of qualifying round 2 and freestyle final for the individual competition, and average of individual round 1 scores for the team competition.)

=== Eventing ===
Athlete	Horse	Event	Dressage		Cross-country			Jumping						Total	
Athlete	Horse	Event	Dressage		Cross-country			Qualifier			Final			Total	
Athlete	Horse	Event	Penalties	Rank	Penalties	Total	Rank	Penalties	Total	Rank	Penalties	Total	Rank	Penalties	Rank
Tina Cook	Miners Frolic	Individual	40.20	13	17.20	57.40	10	0.00	57.40	6 Q	0.00	57.40	3	57.40	3rd place, bronze medalist(s)
Daisy Dick	Spring Along	Individual	51.70 #	37	17.20	68.90 #	24	11.00	79.90 #	24	Did not advance			79.90	24
William Fox-Pitt	Parkmore Ed	Individual	50.20 #	34	10.00	60.20	14	4.00	64.20	14 Q	4.00	68.20	12	68.20	12
Sharon Hunt	Tankers Town	Individual	43.50	18	47.60	91.10 #	38	4.00	95.90 #	35	Did not advance			95.90	35
Mary King	Call Again Cavalier	Individual	38.10	9	18.00	56.10	5	8.00	64.10	13 Q	4.00	68.10	11	68.10	11
Tina Cook; Daisy Dick; William Fox-Pitt; Sharon Hunt; Mary King	See above	Team	121.80	4	51.90	173.70	3	12.00	185.70	3	—N/a			185.70	3rd place, bronze medalist(s)

# – Indicates that points do not count in team total

=== Show jumping ===
Athlete	Horse	Event	Qualification								Final					Total	
Athlete	Horse	Event	Round 1		Round 2			Round 3			Round A		Round B			Total	
Athlete	Horse	Event	Penalties	Rank	Penalties	Total	Rank	Penalties	Total	Rank	Penalties	Rank	Penalties	Total	Rank	Penalties	Rank
Ben Maher	Rolette	Individual	1	=14	4	5	=13 Q	0	5	6 Q	0	=1 Q	20	20	=20	20	=20
Nick Skelton	Russel	Individual	1	=14	8	9	=22 Q	13	22	=31 Q	12	29	Did not advance			12	29
Tim Stockdale	Fresh Direct Corlato	Individual	4	=30	4	8	=16 Q	8	16	=18 Q	0	=1 Q	16	16	=17	16	=16
John Whitaker	Peppermill	Individual	5	=39	Withdrew (lame horse)												
Michael Whitaker	Suncal Portofino 63	Individual	Withdrew (lame horse)														
Ben Maher; Nick Skelton*; Tim Stockdale; John Whitaker	(as above)	Team	—N/a								16	=4	21	37	7	37	6**

* Reserve rider Nick Skelton was added to the show jumping team event as a substitute for Michael Whitaker who had withdrawn from the competition.

** On 21 August, four horses from Brazil, Germany, Ireland and Norway tested positive for a banned substance. The riders were subsequently disqualified from the individual competition and if the B samples test positive then Brazil, Germany and Norway will be disqualified from the team competition and Great Britain will move into 5th place.

== Fencing ==
Great Britain qualified three fencers for the individual fencing events. Cambridge University student Alex O'Connell was the only fencer included in the original allocation for Team GB announced in May 2008. The other two British fencers were added through the re-allocation of places by the FIE (the governing body for Olympic fencing) following the withdrawal of entrants from other NOCs.

Men

Athlete	Event	Round of 64	Round of 32	Round of 16	Quarterfinal	Semi-final	Final / BM	
Athlete	Event	Opposition Score	Opposition Score	Opposition Score	Opposition Score	Opposition Score	Opposition Score	Rank
Richard Kruse	Individual foil	—N/a	Saliscan (ROU); W 15–6	Joppich (GER); L 9–10	Did not advance			
Alex O'Connell	Individual sabre	Kovalev (RUS); L 14–15	Did not advance					

Women

Athlete	Event	Round of 64	Round of 32	Round of 16	Quarterfinal	Semi-final	Final / BM	
Athlete	Event	Opposition Score	Opposition Score	Opposition Score	Opposition Score	Opposition Score	Opposition Score	Rank
Martina Emanuel	Individual foil	Smart (USA); L 7–15	Did not advance					

== Field hockey ==
=== Men's tournament ===
The Great Britain men's team qualified for the men's Olympic field hockey tournament after a must-win game against India in the final of the Olympic qualifying event. Great Britain was drawn in Group B of the Olympic tournament based on the FIH Men's World Rankings on 17 April 2008. Having finished third in their group, the team went on to finish fifth overall, beating South Korea in the 5th/6th place classification match. Matt Daly was the team's top scorer in the tournament, with three goals.

==== Team roster ====
The following is the British roster in the men's field hockey tournament of the 2008 Summer Olympics.

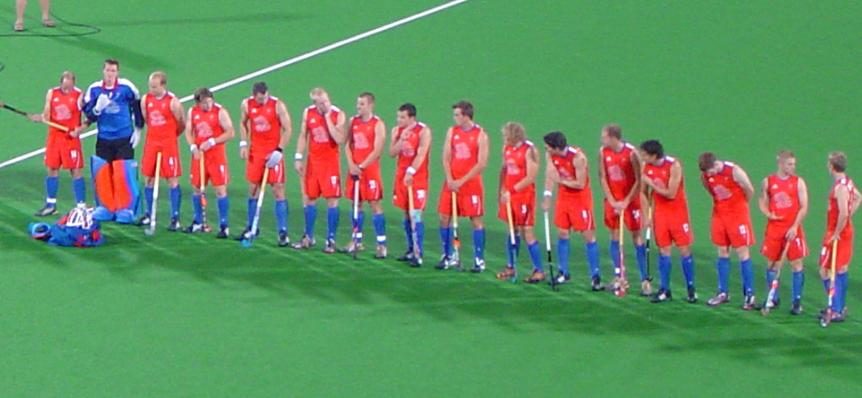
Great Britain's men's field hockey team just before the group stage match against South Africa. From left to right: Hawes, McGregor, Kirkham, Dick, R. Mantell, Wilson, Bleby, Tindall, Daly, Alexander, S. Mantell, Marsden, Moore, Clarke, Jackson, Middleton.

Head Coach: Jason Lee

1. Alistair McGregor (GK)
4. Glenn Kirkham
5. Richard Alexander
6. Richard Mantell
7. Ashley Jackson
8. Simon Mantell
9. Stephen Dick
10. Matt Daly
12. Jonty Clarke
13. Rob Moore
14. Ben Hawes (c)
17. Alastair Wilson
18. Barry Middleton
20. James Tindall
21. Jon Bleby
24. Ben Marsden

Reserves:

16. Niall Stott
25. James Fair (GK)

==== Group play ====
Pos	Team	Pld	W	D	L	GF	GA	GD	Pts	Qualification
1	Netherlands	5	4	1	0	16	6	+10	13	Semi-finals
2	Australia	5	3	2	0	24	7	+17	11	Semi-finals
3	Great Britain	5	2	2	1	10	7	+3	8	Fifth place game
4	Pakistan	5	2	0	3	11	13	−2	6	Seventh place game
5	Canada	5	1	1	3	10	17	−7	4	Ninth place game
6	South Africa	5	0	0	5	4	25	−21	0	Eleventh place game

11 August 2008
10:30

Pakistan	2–4	Great Britain
Abbasi 45'; Waqas 59'	Report	Tindall 2'; Moore 14'; Jackson 29'; Daly 62'

Umpires:
John Wright (RSA)
Amarjit Singh (MAS)

13 August 2008
21:00

Netherlands	1–0	Great Britain
Taekema 63'	Report

Umpires:
Murray Grime (AUS)
Gary Simmonds (RSA)

15 August 2008
21:00

South Africa	0–2	Great Britain
	Report	Tindall 20'; Daly 66'

Umpires:
Christian Blasch (GER)
Rob ten Cate (NED)

17 August 2008
08:30

Great Britain	1–1	Canada
Daly 67'	Report	Pereira 47'

Umpires:
Roel van Eert (NED)
Gary Simmonds (RSA)

19 August 2008
20:30

Australia	3–3	Great Britain
George 40'; Dwyer 45'; Ockenden 68'	Report	Middleton 34'; R. Mantell 47'; Moore 55'

Umpires:
Christian Blasch (GER)
Xavier Adell (ESP)

==== Classification match for 5th/6th place ====
23 August 2008
11:00

South Korea	2–5	Great Britain
Jang Jong-hyun 48'; Hyun Hye-sung 67'	Report	Middleton 44'; Jackson 49'; Clarke 54', 63'; Kirkham 70'

Umpires:
Murray Grime (AUS)
Roel van Eert (NED)

=== Women's tournament ===
The Great Britain women's team qualified for the women's Olympic field hockey tournament during the 2007 Women's EuroHockey Nations Championship. Great Britain was drawn in Group B of the Olympic tournament based on the FIH Women's World Rankings on 5 May 2008. Having finished third in their group, the team proceeded to the 5th/6th place classification match where they lost to Australia. Crista Cullen was the team's top scorer in the tournament, with three goals.

==== Team roster ====
The following is the British roster in the women's field hockey tournament of the 2008 Summer Olympics.

Head Coach: Danny Kerry

2. Beth Storry (GK)
3. Lisa Wooding
4. Anne Panter
5. Crista Cullen
6. Melanie Clewlow
7. Charlotte Craddock
8. Helen Richardson
9. Joanne Ellis
10. Lucilla Wright
11. Kate Walsh (c)
12. Chloe Rogers
13. Jennie Bimson
14. Rachel Walker
15. Alex Danson
18. Sarah Thomas
22. Jo Ellis

Reserves:

1. Katy Roberts (GK)
19. Laura Barlett

==== Group play ====
Team	Pld	W	D	L	GF	GA	GD	Pts	Qualification
Germany	5	4	0	1	12	8	+4	12	Advanced to semifinals
Argentina	5	3	2	0	13	7	+6	11	Advanced to semifinals
Great Britain	5	2	2	1	7	9	−2	8	
United States	5	1	3	1	9	8	+1	6	
Japan	5	1	1	3	5	7	−2	4	
New Zealand	5	0	0	5	6	13	−7	0	

10 August 2008
21:00

Germany	5–1	Great Britain
Rinne 26', 52'; Hoffmann 31', 49'; Rodewald 60'	Report	Cullen 29'

Umpires:
Sarah Garnett (NZL)
Miao Lin (CHN)

12 August 2008
08:30

Argentina	2–2	Great Britain
García 10'; Gulla 27'	Report	Thomas 49'; Clewlow 51'

Umpires:
Marelize de Klerk (RSA)
Stella Bartlema (NED)

14 August 2008
21:00

New Zealand	1–2	Great Britain
Flynn 28'	Report	Danson 31'; Cullen 50'

Umpires:
Julie Ashton-Lucy (AUS)
Carolina de la Fuente (ARG)

16 August 2008
20:30

Great Britain	2–1	Japan
Panter 32'; Cullen 70'	Report	Miura 58'

Umpires:
Minka Woolley (AUS)
Carol Metchette (IRL)

18 August 2008
18:00

Great Britain	0–0	United States
	Report

Umpires:
Ute Conen (GER)
Lisa Roach (AUS)

==== Classification match for 5th/6th place ====
22 August 2008
11:00

Australia	2–0	Great Britain
Blyth 29'; Munro 68'	Report

Umpires:
Sarah Garnett (NZL)
Miao Lin (CHN)

== Gymnastics ==
Team GB entered nine gymnasts into the artistic and trampoline events. On winning the bronze medal in the men's pommel horse event, Louis Smith became the first Briton to win an individual gymnastics medal since Walter Tysall won silver in the men's all-around event in 1908. Laura Jones was originally selected to take part in the women's artistic team event but, because of a slipped disc in her back, she was replaced by the reserve gymnast Imogen Cairns.

=== Artistic ===
Men

Athlete	Event	Qualification								Final							
Athlete	Event	Apparatus						Total	Rank	Apparatus						Total	Rank
Athlete	Event	F	PH	R	V	PB	HB	Total	Rank	F	PH	R	V	PB	HB	Total	Rank
Daniel Keatings	All-around	14.900	15.175	13.775	15.625	14.900	14.575	88.950	25 Q	14.850	15.700	14.000	15.800	14.425	14.225	89.000	20
Louis Smith	All-around	13.700	15.325	13.325	15.375	13.425	14.175	85.325	41	Did not advance							
Louis Smith	Pommel horse	—N/a	15.325	—N/a				15.325	5 Q	—N/a	15.725	—N/a				15.725	3rd place, bronze medalist(s)

Women
Team

Athlete	Event	Qualification						Final					
Athlete	Event	Apparatus				Total	Rank	Apparatus				Total	Rank
Athlete	Event	F	V	UB	BB	Total	Rank	F	V	UB	BB	Total	Rank
Imogen Cairns	Team	14.855	14.850	13.475	14.175	57.050	33	Did not advance					
Beckie Downie	Team	14.150	15.050	14.650	14.225	58.075	24 Q	Did not advance					
Marissa King	Team	13.750	14.875	13.475	14.325	56.425	42	Did not advance					
Beth Tweddle	Team	14.950	—N/a	15.650 Q	—N/a			Did not advance					
Hannah Whelan	Team	14.125	13.500	—N/a	14.325	—N/a		Did not advance					
Rebecca Wing	Team	—N/a	14.550	14.575	14.575	—N/a		Did not advance					
Total	Team	57.775	59.325	57.875	57.450	232.425	9	Did not advance					

Individual finals

Athlete	Event	Apparatus				Total	Rank
Athlete	Event	F	V	UB	BB	Total	Rank
Beckie Downie	All-around	14.100	15.025	15.625	14.700	59.450	12
Beth Tweddle	Uneven bars	—N/a		16.625	—N/a	16.625	4

The result of the uneven bars final, in which Britain's Beth Tweddle placed 4th, was called into question after documents were found that seemed to say that Chinese gymnasts He Kexin and Yang Yilin were only 14, and therefore under the age required to compete, at the time of the Games. An investigation into their ages was launched by the IOC to determine whether it was necessary to disqualify them, thus Tweddle's standing could have been changed to 2nd, giving her a silver medal. After a five-and-a-half-week investigation the Chinese athletes were cleared and the original results allowed to stand.

=== Trampoline ===
Claire Wright was the only British competitor on the trampoline.

Athlete	Event	Qualification		Final	
Athlete	Event	Score	Rank	Score	Rank
Claire Wright	Women's	63.10	10	Did not advance	

== Judo ==
Team GB was represented in the judo events by seven judoka (four men and three women), including the 2005 world champion Craig Fallon. None of the British entrants made it past the quarterfinal stages of the competition or through to the medal match of the repechage, so the team failed to meet the two-medal target set by UK Sport.

Men

Athlete	Event	Preliminary	Round of 32	Round of 16	Quarterfinals	Semi-finals	Repechage 1	Repechage 2	Repechage 3	Final / BM	
Athlete	Event	Opposition Result	Opposition Result	Opposition Result	Opposition Result	Opposition Result	Opposition Result	Opposition Result	Opposition Result	Opposition Result	Rank
Craig Fallon	−60 kg	Bye	Siccardi (MON); W 1010–0000	Paischer (AUT); L 0001–0002	Did not advance		Ahamdi (MAR); W 0011–0000	Kim K-J (PRK); W 0100–0001	Yekutiel (ISR); L 0101–0200	Did not advance	
Euan Burton	−81 kg	Bye	Lucenti (ARG); W 0010–0001	Attaf (MAR); W 0010–0001	Gontiuk (UKR); L 0010–0121	Did not advance	Bye	Valles (COL); W 0110–0001	Camilo (BRA); L 0010–0100	Did not advance	
Winston Gordon	−90 kg	—N/a	Nabiev (UZB); L 0020–0100	Did not advance							
Peter Cousins	−100 kg	—N/a	Zhorzholiani (GEO); L 0000–0010	Did not advance							

Women

Athlete	Event	Round of 32	Round of 16	Quarterfinals	Semi-finals	Repechage 1	Repechage 2	Repechage 3	Final / BM	
Athlete	Event	Opposition Result	Opposition Result	Opposition Result	Opposition Result	Opposition Result	Opposition Result	Opposition Result	Opposition Result	Rank
Sarah Clark	−63 kg	Heill (AUT); L 0100–1011	Did not advance							
Michelle Rogers	−78 kg	Bye	Jeong G-M (KOR); L 0000–0001	Did not advance						
Karina Bryant	+78 kg	Bye	Zambotti (MEX); L 0001–0021	Did not advance						

== Modern pentathlon ==
Team GB sent the maximum allowance of four competitors for the modern pentathlon events in Beijing. For the first time since 1996, the team had entrants in the men's competition.

Athlete	Event	Shooting (10 m air pistol)			Fencing (épée one touch)			Swimming (200 m freestyle)			Riding (show jumping)			Running (3000 m)			Total points	Final rank
Athlete	Event	Points	Rank	MP Points	Results	Rank	MP points	Time	Rank	MP points	Penalties	Rank	MP points	Time	Rank	MP Points	Total points	Final rank
Sam Weale	Men's	177	25	1060	18–17	13	832	2:02.87	8	1328	164	18	1036	9:21.18	8	1156	5412	10
Nick Woodbridge	Men's	160	35	856	14–21	29	736	1:55.96	2	1412	140	12	1060	9:34.46	20	1104	5168	25
Heather Fell	Women's	185	6	1156	20–15	=11	880	2:12.77	3	1328	56	11	1144	10:19.28	5	1244	5752	2nd place, silver medalist(s)
Katy Livingston	Women's	178	18	1072	17–18	=18	808	2:15.68	7	1292	28	6	1172	10:29.47	10	1204	5548	7

== Rowing ==
Great Britain was represented by 43 rowers in 12 boats, the highest number since qualifying quotas were introduced for rowing after the 1992 Summer Olympics. Crews were fielded in 12 out of a possible 14 events, making Team GB the fourth biggest team. Medals were won in six events, and Britain topped the rowing medal table. The medals won included gold in the coxless four, for the third successive Games, and Zac Purchase and Mark Hunter winning Great Britain's first ever lightweight rowing Olympic medal in the men's lightweight double sculls.

Men

Athlete	Event	Heats		Repechage		Quarter-finals		Semi-finals		Final	
Athlete	Event	Time	Rank	Time	Rank	Time	Rank	Time	Rank	Time	Rank
Alan Campbell	Single sculls	7:14.98	1 QF	—N/a		6:52.74	2 SA/B	7:05.24	2 FA	7:04:47	5
Robin Bourne-Taylor; Tom Solesbury	Coxless pair	6:59.48	4 R	6:41.43	4 FC	—N/a		Bye		6:46.83	13
Stephen Rowbotham; Matt Wells	Double sculls	6:26.33	1 SA/B	Bye		—N/a		6:21.15	3 FA	6:29.10	3rd place, bronze medalist(s)
Mark Hunter; Zac Purchase	Lightweight double sculls	6:13.69 OB	1 SA/B	Bye		—N/a		6:29.56	1 FA	6:10.99	1st place, gold medalist(s)
Tom James; Pete Reed; Andrew Triggs Hodge; Steve Williams	Coxless four	6:00.59	1 SA/B	Bye		—N/a		5:54.77	1 FA	6:06.57	1st place, gold medalist(s)
Richard Chambers; James Clarke; James Lindsay-Fynn; Paul Mattick	Lightweight coxless four	5:52.38	2 SA/B	Bye		—N/a		6:08.75	3 FA	5:52.12	5
Richard Egington; Alastair Heathcote; Matt Langridge; Tom Lucy; Acer Nethercott (cox); Alex Partridge; Colin Smith; Tom Stallard; Josh West	Eight	5:25.86	1 FA	Bye		—N/a				5:25.11	2nd place, silver medalist(s)

Women

Athlete	Event	Heats		Repechage		Semi-finals		Final	
Athlete	Event	Time	Rank	Time	Rank	Time	Rank	Time	Rank
Louisa Reeve; Olivia Whitlam	Coxless pair	7:29.88	3 R	7:34.54	2 FA	—N/a		7:33.61	6
Anna Bebington; Elise Laverick	Double sculls	7:08.65	3 R	6:54.76	1 FA	—N/a		7:07.55	3rd place, bronze medalist(s)
Helen Casey; Hester Goodsell	Lightweight double sculls	6:55.23	3 R	7:24.23	1 SA/B	7:17.67	5 FB	7:11.24	11
Debbie Flood; Katherine Grainger; Frances Houghton; Annabel Vernon	Quadruple sculls	6:13.70	1 FA	Bye		—N/a		6:17.37	2nd place, silver medalist(s)
Carla Ashford; Jess Eddie; Katie Greves; Natasha Howard*; Alison Knowles*; Caroline O'Connor (cox); Natasha Page; Beth Rodford; Sarah Winckless	Eight	6:08.68	2 R	6:12.10	3 FA	—N/a		6:13.74	5

Qualification Legend: FA=Final A (medal); FB=Final B (non-medal); FC=Final C (non-medal); FD=Final D (non-medal); FE=Final E (non-medal); FF=Final F (non-medal); SA/B=Semifinals A/B; SC/D=Semifinals C/D; SE/F=Semifinals E/F; QF=Quarterfinals; R=Repechage

* Substitutes in final because of illness: Alice Freeman and Louisa Reeve for Howard and Knowles

== Sailing ==
Great Britain entered crews in all 11 sailing events at the Games. The team finished top of the sailing medal table, with six medals won, thus exceeding the target of four set by UK Sport. Ben Ainslie won a gold medal for the third successive Games to become the most decorated British Olympic sailor of all time.

Men

Athlete	Event	Race											Net points	Final rank
Athlete	Event	1	2	3	4	5	6	7	8	9	10	M*	Net points	Final rank
Nick Dempsey	RS:X	11	9	3	2	1	7	~~17~~	5	3	5	14	60	4
Paul Goodison	Laser	~~15~~	2	15	1	9	7	1	4	6	CAN	18	63	1st place, gold medalist(s)
Jonathan Glanfield; Nick Rogers	470	19	5	1	4	9	6	20	~~30~~; ~~OCS~~	2	3	6	75	2nd place, silver medalist(s)
Iain Percy; Andrew Simpson	Star	7	~~13~~	3	5	8	2	1	1	2	6	14	49	1st place, gold medalist(s)

Women

Athlete	Event	Race											Net points	Final rank
Athlete	Event	1	2	3	4	5	6	7	8	9	10	M*	Net points	Final rank
Bryony Shaw	RS:X	4	3	11	6	~~28~~; ~~OCS~~	6	5	3	1	2	4	45	3rd place, bronze medalist(s)
Penny Clark	Laser Radial	2	22	1	22	3	17	18	~~23~~	13	CAN	14	112	10
Christina Bassadone; Saskia Clark	470	~~20~~; ~~DSQ~~	8	3	4	15	13	8	3	15	5	8	82	6
Sarah Ayton; Sarah Webb; Pippa Wilson	Yngling	2	3	4	~~7~~	4	2	2	5	CAN	CAN	2	24	1st place, gold medalist(s)

Open

Athlete	Event	Race																Net points	Final rank
Athlete	Event	1	2	3	4	5	6	7	8	9	10	11	12	13	14	15	M*	Net points	Final rank
Ben Ainslie	Finn	~~10~~	1	4	1	1	10	2	2	CAN	CAN	—N/a					2	23	1st place, gold medalist(s)
Stevie Morrison; Ben Rhodes	49er	4	3	5	14	14	15	~~20~~; ~~OCS~~	3	2	8	11	15	CAN	CAN	CAN	6	100	9
Will Howden; Leigh McMillan	Tornado	6	8	13	8	~~14~~	7	7	2	3	12	—N/a					2	68	6

M = Medal race; EL = Eliminated – did not advance into the medal race; CAN = Race cancelled; OCS = On the course side of the starting line;

== Shooting ==
Great Britain qualified five entrants for the shooting competition, four in the shotgun events and one in the rifle events. Olympic gold medallist Richard Faulds, who won the Men's double trap in 2000, progressed furthest amongst the British competitors, finishing in sixth place.

Men

Athlete	Event	Qualification		Final	
Athlete	Event	Points	Rank	Points	Rank
Richard Faulds	Double trap	137	5 Q	180	6
Jon Hammond	10 m air rifle	589	29	Did not advance	
Jon Hammond	50 m rifle 3 positions	1148	42	Did not advance	
Jon Hammond	50 m rifle prone	589	34	Did not advance	
Steve Scott	Double trap	134	14	Did not advance	

Women

Athlete	Event	Qualification		Final	
Athlete	Event	Points	Rank	Points	Rank
Elena Allen	Skeet	66	14	Did not advance	
Charlotte Kerwood	Trap	58	16	Did not advance	

== Swimming ==
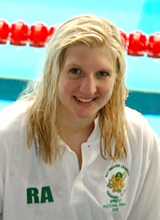
Double gold medallist Rebecca Adlington

Thirty-seven athletes represented Team GB in the swimming events. Selection followed the 2008 British Olympic Swimming Trials in Sheffield in April, with open water event swimmers selected after performance in the 2008 World Open Water Swimming Championships, in Seville, Spain. In winning six medals (two gold, two silver and two bronze) the team bettered the target of three medals set by UK Sport. Rebecca Adlington was the most successful swimmer, winning two gold medals. Her 400 m freestyle success was Britain's first Olympic swimming title since 1988, and the first swimming gold by a British woman since 1960. Her second gold, in the 800 m freestyle, meant she also equalled the best performance by a British woman, from any sport, at the summer Olympics and was the best swimming performance by a Briton at the Olympics for 100 years.

Men

Athlete	Event	Heat		Semi-final		Final	
Athlete	Event	Time	Rank	Time	Rank	Time	Rank
David Carry	400 m freestyle	3:47.17 NR	15	—N/a		Did not advance	
Richard Charlesworth	1500 m freestyle	15:17.27	25	—N/a		Did not advance	
Chris Cook	100 m breaststroke	1:00.70	15 Q	1:00.81	15	Did not advance	
Todd Cooper	100 m butterfly	52.52	29	Did not advance			
Euan Dale	400 m individual medley	4:18.60	19	—N/a		Did not advance	
Ross Davenport	200 m freestyle	1:47.13	11 Q	1:47.35	10	Did not advance	
David Davies	1500 m freestyle	14:46.11	5 Q	—N/a		14:52.11	6
David Davies	10 km open water	—N/a				1:51:53.1	2nd place, silver medalist(s)
Mark Foster	50 m freestyle	22.35	23	Did not advance			
Kristopher Gilchrist	100 m breaststroke	1:01.34	27	Did not advance			
Kristopher Gilchrist	200 m breaststroke	2:11.13	15 Q	2:10.27 NR	13	Did not advance	
James Goddard	200 m individual medley	1:59.74	13 Q	1:58.63	6 Q	1:59.24	6
Thomas Haffield	400 m individual medley	4:16.72	17	—N/a		Did not advance	
James Kirton	200 m breaststroke	2:15.25	37	Did not advance			
Dean Milwain	400 m freestyle	3:48.77	21	—N/a		Did not advance	
Robbie Renwick	200 m freestyle	1:47.82	17 Q	1:47.07	8 Q	1:47.47	8
Michael Rock	100 m butterfly	52.48	27	Did not advance			
Michael Rock	200 m butterfly	1:55.55	9 Q	1:55.90	12	Did not advance	
Gregor Tait	100 m backstroke	54.62	16 Q	54.37	12	Did not advance	
Gregor Tait	200 m backstroke	1:57.03	5 Q	1:56.72	6 Q	1:57.00	8
Liam Tancock	100 m backstroke	53.85	6 Q	53.61	6 Q	53.39 NR	6
Liam Tancock	200 m individual medley	1:59.79	14 Q	1:59.42	7 Q	2:00.76	8
Adam Brown; Simon Burnett; Ross Davenport; Benjamin Hockin	4 × 100 m freestyle relay	3:13.69 NR	8 Q	—N/a		3:12.87 NR	8
David Carry; Ross Davenport; Benjamin Hockin; Andrew Hunter; Robbie Renwick	4 × 200 m freestyle relay	7:07.89 NR	4 Q	—N/a		7:05.92 NR	6
Simon Burnett; Chris Cook; Michael Rock; Liam Tancock	4 × 100 m medley relay	3:33.83 NR	5 Q	—N/a		3:33.69 NR	6

Qualifiers for the latter rounds (Q) of all events were decided on a time only basis, therefore positions shown are overall results versus competitors in all heats.

Women

Athlete	Event	Heat		Semi-final		Final	
Athlete	Event	Time	Rank	Time	Rank	Time	Rank
Rebecca Adlington	400 m freestyle	4:02.24	2 Q	—N/a		4:03.22	1st place, gold medalist(s)
Rebecca Adlington	800 m freestyle	8:18.08 OR	1 Q	—N/a		8:14.10 WR	1st place, gold medalist(s)
Kirsty Balfour	100 m breaststroke	1:08.30	14 Q	1:09.23	15	Did not advance	
Kirsty Balfour	200 m breaststroke	2:27.87	18	Did not advance			
Ellen Gandy	200 m butterfly	2:08.98	15 Q	2:10.60	15	Did not advance	
Francesca Halsall	50 m freestyle	24.93	8 Q	24.80	10	Did not advance	
Francesca Halsall	100 m freestyle	53.93	5 Q	53.94	5 Q	54.29	8
Francesca Halsall	100 m butterfly	58.70	21	Did not advance			
Kate Haywood	100 m breaststroke	1:08.18	11 Q	1:08.36	11	Did not advance	
Joanne Jackson	200 m freestyle	1:58.00	14 Q	1:58.70	14	Did not advance	
Joanne Jackson	400 m freestyle	4.03.80	4 Q	—N/a		4:03.52	3rd place, bronze medalist(s)
Jemma Lowe	100 m butterfly	58.49	16 Q	57.78 NR	6 Q	58.06	6
Jemma Lowe	200 m butterfly	2:08.07	10 Q	2:07.87	9	Did not advance	
Caitlin McClatchey	100 m freestyle	DNS		Did not advance			
Caitlin McClatchey	200 m freestyle	1:56.97	3 Q	1:57.73	7 Q	1:57.65	6
Hannah Miley	200 m individual medley	2:11.72	4 Q	2:12.35	11	Did not advance	
Hannah Miley	400 m individual medley	4:36.56	8 Q	—N/a		4:39.44	6
Cassie Patten	800 m freestyle	8:25.91	8 Q	—N/a		8:32.35	8
Cassie Patten	10 km open water	—N/a				1:59:31.0	3rd place, bronze medalist(s)
Keri-Anne Payne	200 m individual medley	2.12.78	15 Q	2:14.14	16	Did not advance	
Keri-Anne Payne	400 m individual medley	4:38.69	15	—N/a		Did not advance	
Keri-Anne Payne	10 km open water	—N/a				1:59:29.2	2nd place, silver medalist(s)
Elizabeth Simmonds	100 m backstroke	1:00.53	12 Q	1:00.39	10	Did not advance	
Elizabeth Simmonds	200 m backstroke	2:08.66 NR	2 Q	2:08.96	7 Q	2:08.51 NR	6
Gemma Spofforth	100 m backstroke	1:00.11	6 Q	59.79	5 Q	59.38	4
Gemma Spofforth	200 m backstroke	2:10.56	16 Q	2:09.19	9	Did not advance	
Julia Beckett; Francesca Halsall; Melanie Marshall; Caitlin McClatchey; Jessica Sylvester	4 × 100 m freestyle relay	3:39.18 NR	8 Q	—N/a		3:38.18 NR	7
Rebecca Adlington; Francesca Halsall; Joanne Jackson; Melanie Marshall; Caitlin McClatchey; Hannah Miley	4 × 200 m freestyle relay	7:56.16	9	—N/a		Did not advance	
Francesca Halsall; Kate Haywood; Jemma Lowe; Gemma Spofforth	4 × 100 m medley relay	3:59.14	2 Q	—N/a		3:57.50	4

Qualifiers for the latter rounds (Q) of all events were decided on a time only basis, therefore positions shown are overall results versus competitors in all heats.

== Synchronised swimming ==
Team GB was represented by two artistic swimmers, Olivia Allison and Jenna Randall, who placed 14th in the women's duet event. This was the first time since 1992 that Britain had taken part in the synchronised swimming competition at the Olympics.

Athlete	Event	Technical routine		Free routine (preliminary)			Free routine (final)		
Athlete	Event	Points	Rank	Points	Total (technical + free)	Rank	Points	Total (technical + free)	Rank
Olivia Allison; Jenna Randall	Duet	43.917	14	44.667	88.584	14	Did not advance		

== Taekwondo ==
Team GB entered three athletes into the taekwondo competition. Sarah Stevenson won Team GB's first-ever medal in Olympic taekwondo – a bronze in the women's +67 kg category. Another British hopeful, Aaron Cook, missed out on bronze in the men's −80 kg, which led to his coach publicly criticising the referee's decisions.

Athlete	Event	Round of 16	Quarterfinals	Semi-finals	Repechage	Bronze medal	Final	
Athlete	Event	Opposition Result	Opposition Result	Opposition Result	Opposition Result	Opposition Result	Opposition Result	Rank
Michael Harvey	Men's −58 kg	Pérez (MEX); L 2–3	Did not advance		Nikpai (AFG); L 1–3	Did not advance		
Aaron Cook	Men's −80 kg	Jason (MHL); W 7–0	Vásquez (VEN); W 5–2	Sarmiento (ITA); L 5–6	Bye	Zhu G (CHN); L 1–4	Did not advance	5
Sarah Stevenson	Women's +67 kg	Dawani (JOR); W 3–2	Chen Z (CHN); W 2–1*	Espinoza (MEX); L 1–4	Bye	Abd Rabo (EGY); W 5–1	Did not advance	3rd place, bronze medalist(s)

* After a successful appeal by the British team, the result of Stevenson's quarterfinal match was reversed, granting her two points for a final-round kick to Chen's head which the judges had previously missed. The reversal of the decision, after video footage was considered, is thought to be a first for the sport.

== Tennis ==
Great Britain was represented in the tennis competition by brothers Andy and Jamie Murray. In the first round of the singles tournament, Andy was defeated in straight sets by Chinese Taipei's Lu Yen-hsun. The Murray brothers were later eliminated in the second round of the men's doubles tournament.

Athlete	Event	Round of 64	Round of 32	Round of 16	Quarterfinals	Semi-finals	Final / BM	
Athlete	Event	Opposition Score	Opposition Score	Opposition Score	Opposition Score	Opposition Score	Opposition Score	Rank
Andy Murray	Men's singles	Lu Y-H (TPE); L 6–7^{(5–7)}, 4–6	Did not advance					
Andy Murray; Jamie Murray	Men's doubles	—N/a	Nestor / Niemeyer (CAN); W 4–6, 6–3, 6–4	Clément / Llodra (FRA); L 1–6, 3–6	Did not advance			

== Triathlon ==
Five competitors were selected to represent Team GB in the triathlon, with three in the men's event and two in the women's. The best result was recorded by Alistair Brownlee, who finished in 12th place.

Athlete	Event	Swim (1.5 km)	Trans 1	Bike (40 km)	Trans 2	Run (10 km)	Total Time	Rank
Alistair Brownlee	Men's	18:11	0:27	59:05	0:29	32:07	1:50:19	12
Will Clarke	Men's	18:53	0:27	58:23	0:31	32:18	1:50:32	14
Tim Don	Men's	18:54	0:26	Lapped on bike (eliminated)				
Hollie Avil	Women's	20:09	0:32	Did not finish				
Helen Tucker	Women's	19:52	0:31	1:04:17	0:36	37:39	2:02:55	21

== Weightlifting ==
The only British weightlifter to qualify for the Games was Michaela Breeze who was competing in her second Olympics. She battled through a back injury, sustained less than a month before the Games, and finished 15th out of 20 competitors in her event.

Athlete	Event	Snatch		Clean & jerk		Total	Rank
Athlete	Event	Result	Rank	Result	Rank	Total	Rank
Michaela Breeze	Women's −63 kg	85	15	100	15	185	15

== Sports not contested ==
There was no Team GB representation at the 2008 Olympics in baseball, basketball, football, handball, softball, table tennis, volleyball and wrestling. British athletes took part in the qualifying competitions for some of these sports in the lead up to the Games, but they either failed to qualify or were unable to participate for other reasons.

=== Baseball ===
The GB baseball team finished second in the 2007 European Baseball Championship behind the Netherlands, which guaranteed Britain a place at the Olympic qualifying tournament in Taiwan; however, a lack of funding forced the British team to withdraw (their place being taken by Germany). UK Sport had withdrawn funding for baseball after 2005, when the IOC removed the sport from the Olympic program for the 2012 Games and beyond.

=== Football ===
The award of the 2012 Summer Olympics to London has brought the question of British participation in the football tournaments to the fore, given that there is traditionally no single United Kingdom national team. The British Olympic Association initially refused to rule out the possibility of entry for 2008, but were unable to come to an agreement with the Scottish Football Association. The 2007 European Under-21 Championship, which served as the European qualifying tournament for the men's competition, saw the England U21 team reach the semi-finals, which would have meant a place at the Olympics. Because at the Olympics the team is representative of the entire UK, England were thus prevented from taking this place, with instead a play-off taking place between Portugal and Italy. A similar situation occurred with the England women's team who would have been granted a place at the 2008 Olympics by virtue of being one of the top three European sides at the 2007 World Cup, but their Olympic qualification was disallowed by FIFA. Instead, there was a play-off between Denmark and Sweden to claim the vacant Olympic qualifying position left by England.

== Media coverage ==
As Britain's Olympic and Paralympic broadcaster, the BBC held exclusive rights to terrestrial coverage of the 2008 Games in the United Kingdom, acquired under the Ofcom Code on Sports and Other Listed and Designated Events. An extensive range of broadcasting options was employed to provide over 2,750 hours of TV coverage.

For the first time, Olympic coverage was broadcast in high definition on the BBC HD channel. Digital TV viewers had access to up to six streamed channels covering the Games on BBC Red Button, whilst the BBC's website permitted British broadband users to view live streams from a variety of events. Live broadcasts ran overnight and throughout the day on BBC One and BBC Two, starting at 02:00 daily; a highlights programme, The Games Today, was broadcast on BBC One following the close of each day's events.

The opening and closing ceremonies were anchored by Sue Barker and Huw Edwards, with additional commentary from Hazel Irvine and Carrie Gracie. For the duration of the Games, general coverage was delivered at various times of the day by a large team of BBC presenters, including Barker, Irvine, Adrian Chiles, Clare Balding, Gabby Logan, Jake Humphrey, and John Inverdale. Detailed analysis was provided by a selection of former Olympic contenders, including gold medallists Michael Johnson (athletics), Jonathan Edwards (athletics), Shirley Robertson (sailing), Adrian Moorhouse (swimming), Sir Steve Redgrave (rowing), and Chris Boardman (cycling).

Eurosport provided continuous pay-TV coverage of the 2008 Games across its territories, viewable in the UK to Sky TV subscribers, including 15 hours a day of live broadcasting between 03:00 and 18:00. The coverage was also available in high definition on Eurosport's new HD channel (first launched in July 2008) to the thousands of Sky+ HD subscribers across the UK. Eurosport's Olympic broadcast sponsor for 2008 was the sportswear brand Asics.

Radio coverage was provided by BBC Radio 5 Live, and BBC Radio 5 Live Sports Extra on digital radio.

== See also ==
- Great Britain at the 2008 Summer Paralympics
