= Muhammad Asif Rana =

Pakistani hockey player

Personal information
- Nationality: Pakistani
- Born: 20 April 1985 (age 40)

Sport
- Sport: Field hockey

Muhammad Asif Rana (born 20 April 1985) is a Pakistani former field hockey player. He competed in the men's tournament at the 2008 Summer Olympics.
