= Muhammad Javed (field hockey) =

Pakistani field hockey player

Muhammad Kashif Javed (born 14 August 1982) is a field hockey player from Pakistan. He also took part in the 2010 Commonwealth Games in New Delhi, India.

== See also ==
- Pakistan national field hockey team
