= Andrew Cronje =

South African field hockey player

Andrew Cronje (born 15 May 1984) is a South African field hockey player who competed in the 2008 and 2012 Summer Olympics. After a year's break, he returned to international hockey at the 2014 Commonwealth Games.
