= Ao Changrong =

Chinese professional field hockey player

Personal information
- Born: March 1, 1983 (age 43) Morin Dawa Daur Autonomous Banner, Inner Mongolia, China
- Height: 1.71 m (5 ft 7 in)

Sport
- Sport: Field hockey
National team
Years	Team	Caps	Goals
–	China		-

Ao Changrong (Chinese: 敖长荣; pinyin: Áo Chángróng, born 1 March 1983 in Morin Dawa Daur Autonomous Banner, Inner Mongolia) is a Chinese professional field hockey player who represented China at the 2008 Summer Olympics in Beijing. The team finished last in their group, and finished 11th after beating South Africa.
