= Alistair McGregor =

British field hockey player (born 1981)

Personal information
- Born: 11 June 1981 (age 45) Aberdeen, Scotland
- Height: 185 cm (6 ft 1 in)
- Weight: 78 kg (172 lb)

Sport
- Sport: Field hockey
- Position: Goalkeeper
Senior career
Years	Team	Caps	Goals
1999–2001	Edinburgh University	-	-
2001–2002	Grange	-	-
2007–2012	Loughborough Students	-	-
National team
Years	Team	Caps	Goals
2007–2008	GB	29	-
2001–	Scotland	104	-

Alistair McGregor (born 11 June 1981) is a male former field hockey goalkeeper from Scotland who competed at the 2008 Summer Olympics.

== Biography ==
McGregor earned his first cap for Scotland in 2001. McGregor was named joint Outstanding UK Player at the 2005 European Championships.

McGregor was part of the Scotland Commonwealth Games team at the 2006 Commonwealth Games in Melbourne and made his Great Britain debut on 23 October 2007.

McGregor played club hockey for Loughborough Students in the Men's England Hockey League. While at Loughborough, McGregor represented Great Britain at the 2008 Olympic Games in Beijing and was named the Great Britain Hockey athlete of the year. He also played for Scotland during the 2010 Commonwealth Games in Delhi.
