= Chris Hibbert =

South African field hockey player

Chris Hibbert (born 29 April 1976) is a South African former field hockey player who competed in the 2004 Summer Olympics and the 2008 Summer Olympics.

He also competed in the 2002 and 2006 Hockey World Cups, and the 2002 and 2006 Commonwealth Games. He was the South African Hockey Men's Player of the Year in 2006. He retired from international hockey in 2008 with 118 test caps.

== Honours ==
- 1999 All African Games - Gold
- 2000 African Cup - Gold
- 2001 Champions Challenge - Silver
- 2003 Champions Challenge - Bronze
- 2003 All African Games - Silver
- 2005 African Cup - Gold
- 2007 African Cup - Gold
