= Matt Peck =

Canadian field hockey player

Personal information
- Born: July 16, 1980 (age 45)
Medal record
Men's field hockey
Representing Canada
Pan American Games
Gold medal – first place	2007 Rio de Janeiro	Team

Matthew "Matt" Peck (born July 16, 1980 in London, Ontario) is a field hockey player, who played for the Canada national field hockey team as a goalkeeper. He was a member of the VRC Jokers, and played his first international senior tournament in 2005.

== International senior competitions ==
- 2006 – World Cup Qualifier, Changzou City (10th)
- 2006 — Commonwealth Games, Melbourne (9th)
- 2007 — Pan American Games, Rio de Janeiro (1st)
- 2010 — Hockey World Cup, Delhi (11th)
