= David Jameson (field hockey) =

Canadian field hockey player

Personal information
- Born: November 1, 1984 (age 41) North Vancouver, British Columbia
- Height: 1.73 m (5 ft 8 in)
- Weight: 79 kg (174 lb)

Sport
- Country: Canada
- Sport: Field hockey
Medal record
Men's field hockey
Representing Canada
Pan American Games
| Gold medal – first place | 2007 Rio de Janeiro | Team |
| Silver medal – second place | 2003 Santo Domingo | Team |
| Silver medal – second place | 2011 Guadalajara | Team |
| Silver medal – second place | 2015 Toronto | Team |

David Jameson (born November 1, 1984, in North Vancouver, British Columbia) is a Canadian field hockey player who was first selected to the Men's National Team for the 2002 Belgium Tour. He is the brother of Canada women's national field hockey team player Stephanie Jameson.

== International senior competitions ==
- 2003 – Pan American Games, Santo Domingo (2nd)
- 2004 – Olympic Qualifier, Madrid (11th)
- 2004 – Pan Am Cup, London (2nd)
- 2006 – Commonwealth Games, Melbourne (9th)
- 2014 – Commonwealth Games, Glasgow (6th)
