= Ben Marsden =

British field hockey player

Personal information
- Born: 16 October 1979 (age 46) Blackpool, Lancashire, England
- Height: 188 cm (6 ft 2 in)
- Weight: 83 kg (183 lb)

Sport
- Sport: Field hockey
- Position: Defender
Senior career
Years	Team	Caps	Goals
1995–	Cheltenham	-	-
–	Teddington	-	-
2001–2008	Surbiton	-	-
–	Wimbledon	-	-
National team
Years	Team	Caps	Goals
2007–	GB & England	87	-

Benjamin John H. Marsden (born 16 October 1979) is an English former field hockey player who plays as a half back. He played for England and Great Britain and competed at the 2008 Summer Olympics.

== Biography ==
Marsden was born in Blackpool, Lancashire, England, educated at Charlton Kings Junior School, Balcarras and Dean Close School and studied at Brunel University of London.

Marsden played club hockey for Teddington in the Men's England Hockey League before joining Surbiton. While at Surbiton he represented England at the 2006 Commonwealth Games in Melbourne, won his first GB cap against the Netherlands in 2007 and represented Great Britain at the 2008 Olympic Games in Beijing in the field hockey tournament.

In 2009 he has coached pupils of King's College School and became the player/coach and then head coach at Wimbledon.

In 2018, he took the role of director of sport at Cheltenham College.
