= Gareth Brooks =

New Zealand field hockey player

Gareth Brooks (born 28 February 1979 in Christchurch) is a field hockey player from New Zealand, who earned his first cap for the national team, nicknamed The Black Sticks, in 2002. The midfielder was a member of the team that finished sixth at the 2004 Summer Olympics in Athens, Greece.

== International senior tournaments ==
- 2003 – Sultan Azlan Shah Cup
- 2003 – Champions Challenge
- 2004 – Olympic Qualifier
- 2004 – Olympic Games
- 2004 – Champions Trophy
- 2005 – Sultan Azlan Shah Cup
- 2006 – Commonwealth Games
- 2006 – World Cup
- 2008 – Olympic Games
