= Darryn Gallagher =

South African field hockey player

Darryn Gallagher (born 24 April 1977) is a South African field hockey player who competed in the 2008 Summer Olympics. He was the head of hockey at Northwood Boys High School before moving to Hilton College where he is now the Director of Sport.
