= Anthony Wright (field hockey) =

Canadian field hockey player

Personal information
- Born: August 3, 1984 (age 41) Vancouver, British Columbia, Canada
Medal record
Men's field hockey
Representing Canada
Pan American Games
Gold medal – first place	2007 Rio de Janeiro	Team

Anthony Wright (born August 3, 1984) is a male field hockey player who played for the Canada national field hockey team as a sweeper.

== International senior competitions ==
- 2006 — World Cup Qualifier, Guangzhou (10th)
- 2006 — Commonwealth Games, Melbourne (9th)
- 2007 — Pan American Games, Rio de Janeiro (1st)
- 2008 — Olympic Games, Beijing (10th)
