= Bradley Shaw =

New Zealand field hockey player

Personal information
- Born: 13 February 1983 (age 43) Christchurch, New Zealand
Medal record
Men's field hockey
Representing New Zealand
Oceania Cup
Silver medal – second place	2015 Stratford	Team
Commonwealth Games
Bronze medal – third place	2010 Delhi	Team
Champions Challenge
Silver medal – second place	2007 Boom	Team

Bradley Shaw (born 13 February 1983 in Christchurch) is a field hockey player from New Zealand, who earned his first cap for the national team, nicknamed The Black Sticks, in 2004 at the Champions Trophy against the Netherlands. He competed for New Zealand at the 2008 Summer Olympics in Beijing, the 2012 Summer Olympics in London and the 2006 Commonwealth Games in Melbourne and the 2014 Commonwealth Games in Glasgow, where New Zealand narrowly missed out on a bronze medal, losing a shoot out to England. He scored the winning goal against Argentina in the 2008 Olympic qualifying tournament.

His older brother Hayden Shaw also plays in the national team.

== International senior tournaments ==
- 2005 – Sultan Azlan Shah Cup, Kuala Lumpur
- 2006 – Commonwealth Games
- 2006 – World Cup
- 2007 – Champions Challenge
- 2008 – Olympic Games
