= Stephen Mowlam =

Australian field hockey player

Personal information
- Born: 22 December 1976 (age 49) Victoria
Medal record
Men's field hockey
Representing Australia
Olympic Games
Gold medal – first place	2004 Athens	Team
World Cup
Silver medal – second place	2006 Mönchengladbach	Team
Champions Trophy
Gold medal – first place	2005 Chennai	Team
Commonwealth Games
Gold medal – first place	2006 Melbourne	Team

Stephen Mowlam OAM (born 22 December 1976) is a field hockey goalkeeper from Australia, who was a member of the team that won the golden medal at the 2004 Summer Olympics in Athens by beating title holders The Netherlands in the final.

He made his debut earlier that year during the Sultan Azlan Shah Cup in Kuala Lumpur, in the match against South Korea on 10 January. Mowlam is nicknamed Gimpy.
