= Marian Schole =

Canadian field hockey player

Personal information
- Born: January 21, 1986 (age 40) Germany
Medal record
Men's field hockey
Representing Canada
Pan American Games
| Gold medal – first place | 2007 Rio de Janeiro | Team |

Marian Schole (born January 21, 1986, in Berlin, Germany) is a male field hockey player, who played for the Canada national field hockey team. He was a member of the Berliner Hockey Club.

== International senior competitions ==
- 2006 — World Cup Qualifier, Guangzhou (10th)
- 2006 — Commonwealth Games, Melbourne (9th)
- 2007 — Pan American Games, Rio de Janeiro (1st)
- 2008 — Olympic Games, Beijing (10th)
