= Ben Hawes =

British field hockey player (born 1980)

Ben Hawes MBE
Personal information
- Born: 28 July 1980 (age 46) Lewes, East Sussex, England
- Height: 175 cm (5 ft 9 in)
- Weight: 73 kg (161 lb)

Sport
- Sport: Field hockey
- Position: Midfield
Senior career
Years	Team	Caps	Goals
–	Lewes	-	-
2003–2004	Surbiton	-	-
2004–2006	Amsterdam	-	-
2006–2010	Surbiton	-	-
2010–2017	Wimbledon	-	-
National team
Years	Team	Caps	Goals
–	GB	99	-
–	England	132	-
Medal record
Men's field hockey
Representing England
Champions Trophy
Silver medal – second place	2010 Mönchengladbach	Team
European Championship
Bronze medal – third place	2003 Barcelona	Team
Gold medal – first place	2009 Amsterdam	Team

Benjamin Robert Hawes MBE (born 28 July 1980) is a former English field hockey player who played for the England and the Great Britain national team in midfield or as a halfback. He represented Great Britain in Field hockey at the 2004, 2008 (as captain) and 2012 Summer Olympics.

== Biography ==
Hawes played club hockey for Surbiton in the Men's England Hockey League and while at Surbiton represented Great Britain at the 2004 Olympic Games in Athens. He moved to play in Amsterdam and represented England at the 2006 Commonwealth Games in Melbourne.

He returned to Surbiton and at the 2008 Olympic Games in Beijing, he represented Great Britain again and was the captain of the team during the tournament. He was part of the silver medal winning England team that competed at the 2010 Men's Hockey Champions Trophy in Mönchengladbach, Germany.

Hawes left Surbiton at the end of 2010 season and joined Wimbledon and while at the club represented Great Britain at the 2012 Olympic Games in London.

Hawes earned 132 caps representing England and 99 caps representing Great Britain (231 international caps) before he announced his retirement from international hockey in 2013.

He became the coach of the Wimbledon men's team and was named Chairman of the British Olympic Association (BOA) Athletes' Commission in 2015, representing British Olympic Athletes on the BOA Board, after serving on the commission for four years.

Hawes was appointed Member of the Order of the British Empire (MBE) in the 2022 Birthday Honours for services to sport.
