= Peter Short (field hockey) =

Canadian field hockey player

Peter Short (born April 26, 1976, in Richmond, British Columbia) is a field hockey player from Canada, whose brother Rob also represents the Men's National Team.

A striker, Short played for several years in the Dutch League with HGC and HC Rotterdam. He left Rotterdam after helping the club promote to the First Division in the spring of 2005. For the next two years, Short moved to the UK and played hockey for Surbiton Hockey Club in the south London area. During his time in London he studied Urban Planning at the University College London, where he acquired a master's degree in International Planning at the University College London.

In the summer of 2007, Short and his Canadian National team members won gold at the Pan American Games in Brazil and by doing so, qualified for the 2008 Beijing Olympic Games. That fall he moved to Amsterdam and played for Laren Hockey Club in the Netherlands and worked at CB Richard Ellis. The Canadian National Field Hockey Team finished in 10th position at the 2008 Olympic Games. Going into the Olympics Canada was ranked 15th in the world.

He was the leading resource manager at a Salesforce Partner, Traction on Demand a company that has since been acquired by Salesforce.

He now resides in Kelowna, British Columbia with his family.

== International senior competitions ==
- 2001 — World Cup Qualifier, Edinburgh (8th)
- 2003 — Pan American Games, Santo Domingo (2nd)
- 2004 — Olympic Qualifier, Madrid (11th)
- 2004 – Pan Am Cup, London (2nd)
- 2006 — Commonwealth Games, Melbourne (9th)
- 2007 — Pan American Games, Rio de Janeiro (1st)
- 2008 — Olympic Games, Beijing, China (10th)
