= Zeeshan Ashraf =

Pakistani field hockey player (born 1977)

Personal information
- Full name: Zeeshan Ashraf Qasmi
- Born: 28 February 1977 (age 49) Quetta, Baluchistan, Pakistan

Sport
- Sport: Field hockey
- Position: Fullback
- Club: NBP

Zeeshan Ashraf
Medal record

Men's field hockey

Representing Pakistan

Asian Games
Gold medal – first place	2010 Guangzhou	Team
Bronze medal – third place	2006 Doha	Team

Commonwealth Games
Silver medal – second place	2006 Melbourne	Team
Bronze medal – third place	2002 Manchester	Team

South Asian Games
Gold medal – first place	2006 Colombo	Team
Gold medal – first place	2010 Dhaka	Team

Zeeshan Ashraf Qasmi (born 28 February 1977 in Quetta, Pakistan) is a former field hockey full back player from Pakistan. He made his international debut for Pakistan in 2001. He captained the national side during the 2008 Beijing Olympics and the 2010 Hockey World Cup. He was also the flag bearer for Pakistan at the 2008 Olympic opening ceremony. His leadership in the 2010 Asian Games secured Pakistan a direct berth for the 2012 London Olympics.

== Career ==
He captained the Pakistan national field hockey team during the 2008 Summer Olympics in Beijing, and the 2010 Hockey World Cup in India. In the latter tournament, Pakistan finished last, after which Ashraf announced that all players on the team, himself included, would retire.

== See also ==
- Pakistan national field hockey team
