= Nasir Ahmed (field hockey) =

Pakistani field hockey player (born 1984)

Personal information
- Nationality: Pakistan
- Born: 7 November 1984 (age 41) Karachi, Pakistan
- Height: 1.65 m (5 ft 5 in)
- Weight: 65 kg (143 lb)

Sport
- Sport: Field hockey

Nasir Ahmed (born 7 November 1984) is a Pakistani former field hockey player. He competed in the 2008 Summer Olympics.

Ahmed was also part of his country's silver-medal winning team at the 2006 Commonwealth Games and bronze-team at the 2006 Asian Games.
