= Salman Akbar =

Pakistani field hockey player (born 1982)

Medal record

Men's field hockey

Representing Pakistan

Asian Games
Gold medal – first place	2010 Guangzhou	Team

Asia Cup
Bronze medal – third place	2013 Ipoh	Team

Champions Trophy
Bronze medal – third place	2003 Amstelveen	Team
Bronze medal – third place	2004 Lahore	Team

Commonwealth Games
Silver medal – second place	2006 Melbourne	Team

Salman Akbar (born 3 January 1982, in Lahore) is a field hockey coach and former player from Pakistan. He is a former captain and goalkeeper of the Pakistan men's national field hockey team. A veteran of 230 games, he has represented Pakistan in the 2004 and 2008 Olympics. He lives in the Netherlands now.

In 2018, he was appointed Japan men's national field hockey team's goalkeeping coach.

== Career ==
In 2001, Akbar was the captain of Pakistan junior hockey team; he represented Pakistan national senior team in Champions Trophy in Rotterdam, Netherlands.

He represented Pakistan in the World Cup in Kuala Lumpur, Malaysia, in 2002, and in the Champions Trophy in Amstelveen, Netherlands, in 2003.

In 2004, he represented Pakistan at Athens in the Summer Olympics and also in the Champions Trophy in Lahore, Pakistan.

In 2005, he won the Robo Cup beating Australia in final Amstelveen, Holland.

In 2006, he won a silver medal in Commonwealth Games Melbourne, Australia, bronze in Asian Games Doha, Qatar and played world cup Mönchengladbach, Germany.

In 2007, he was the captain of Pakistan Hockey Team in the Champions Trophy, at Kuala Lumpur, Malaysia.

In 2008, he represented Pakistan at the Beijing Summer Olympics.

In November 2010, Akbar was a part of the gold medal winning team at the Asian Games in Guangzhou, China. At the 2010 Asian Games he was rewarded as the best goalkeeper in the tournament in Beijing, China and played the World Cup in Delhi, India.

As of 2019, Salman Akbar plays for Victoria and also gives training to the Victoria and HC Pijnacker goalkeepers.

== See also ==
Pakistan national field hockey team
