= Paul Wettlaufer =

Canadian field hockey player

Personal information
- Born: January 28, 1978 (age 48) Calgary, Alberta, Canada
Medal record
Men's field hockey
Representing Canada
Pan American Games
Gold medal – first place	1999 Winnipeg	Team
Gold medal – first place	2007 Rio de Janeiro	Team
Silver medal – second place	2003 Santo Domingo	Team

Paul Wettlaufer (born January 28, 1978) is a Canadian field hockey player.

Wettlaufer earned his first international cap for the Men's National Team in 1998 against Spain in Barcelona. Paul grew up in the District of North Vancouver, British Columbia, where he attended Handsworth Secondary School (1991–1996) and played field hockey for the West Vancouver Field Hockey Club.

== International senior competitions ==
- 1998 – Commonwealth Games, Kuala Lumpur (not ranked)
- 1999 – Sultan Azlan Shah Tournament, Kuala Lumpur (4th)
- 1999 – Pan American Games, Winnipeg (1st)
- 2000 – Sultan Azlan Shah Tournament, Kuala Lumpur (7th)
- 2000 – Americas Cup, Cuba (2nd)
- 2000 – Olympic Games, Sydney (10th)
- 2001 – World Cup Qualifier, Edinburgh (8th)
- 2002 – Commonwealth Games, Manchester (6th)
- 2003 – Pan American Games, Santo Domingo (2nd)
- 2004 – Olympic Qualifying Tournament, Madrid (11th)
- 2004 – Pan Am Cup, London (2nd)
- 2006 – Commonwealth Games, Melbourne (9th)
- 2006 – World Cup Qualifier, Changzhou (10th)
- 2007 – Pan American Games, Rio de Janeiro, Brazil (1st)
- 2008 – Olympic Games, Beijing (10th)
