= Glenn Kirkham =

British field hockey player

Personal information
- Born: 8 October 1982 (age 43) Grimsby, Lincolnshire, England
- Height: 176 cm (5 ft 9 in)
- Weight: 82 kg (181 lb)

Sport
- Sport: Field hockey
- Position: Midfield
Senior career
Years	Team	Caps	Goals
2006–2007	Loughborough Students	-	-
2007–2013	East Grinstead	-	-
National team
Years	Team	Caps	Goals
2002–2013	England & GB	223	-
Medal record
Men's field hockey
Representing England
Champions Trophy
Silver medal – second place	2010 Mönchengladbach	Team
European Championship
Gold medal – first place	2009 Amsterdam	Team
Bronze medal – third place	2011 Mönchengladbach	Team

Glenn Charles W. Kirkham (born 8 October 1982) is an English field hockey player who played for the English and British national team. He competed at the 2008 Summer Olympics and 2012 Summer Olympics. He is currently the Director of Sport at Chigwell School.

== Biography ==
Kirkham born in Grimsby, Lincolnshire, England, was educated at Queen Elizabeth's Grammar School, Alford and played hockey for Long Sutton before studying Sports Science at Loughborough University. While at Loughborough he played club hockey for Loughborough Students in the Men's England Hockey League.

Kirkham made his international senior debut for the national squad in January 2002 in a match against Poland and was named as the England captain for 2006–07 season. and was part of the England team that participated in the field hockey world cup in Monchengladbach, Germany where they finished 5th overall. Additionally, he represented England at the 2006 Commonwealth Games in Melbourne.

After joining East Grinstead for the start of the 2007/08 season, shortly afterwards he represented Great Britain at the 2008 Olympics in Beijing.

He also competed in the 2009 European championships in Amsterdam where England were champions. He was part of the England squad in Delhi, India, at the Hero Honda World Cup that lost only one group game against Spain, putting them through to the semi-finals. Kirkham also played in the 2010 Commonwealth Games in Delhi and was captain of the silver medal winning England team that competed at the 2010 Men's Hockey Champions Trophy in Mönchengladbach, Germany.

Still at East Grinstead, Kirkham represented Great Britain at the 2012 Olympic Games in London, where the team finished in 4th place. .

He retired from international hockey in 2013.

He joined Chigwell School in 2023 as Director of Sport.

== Personal life ==
Kirkham (nicknamed Glenda) started field hockey at the small club of Alford from a young age, where he moved on to Long Sutton. He was educated at Queen Elizabeth's Grammar School, Alford, and then achieved a BSc in Sports Science at Loughborough University.

He used to play football for the youth team of Scunthorpe United FC where he played in the junior FA Cup. He has also been an above average cricket player in his time, representing Alford & District Cricket Club in the Lincolnshire Premier League.

After retiring from international Hockey in 2023, Kirkham Continued his career in education and sports coaching. He worked at The Press School and New Hall School before joining Chigwell School as Director of Sport in September 2023.

He is also Director of Coaching at Chelmsford Hockey Club.

He lives in Hoddesdon and has a wife named Marie Kirkham (nee Arbey) and two daughters (Hattie and Freya)
