= James Fair (field hockey) =

English field hockey player (born 1981)

Personal information
- Born: 8 January 1981 (age 45) Chester, England
- Height: 185 cm (6 ft 1 in)
- Weight: 79 kg (174 lb)

Sport
- Sport: Field hockey
- Position: Goalkeeper
Senior career
Years	Team	Caps	Goals
2000–2012	Cannock	-	-
2024–2025	Bromsgrove	-	-
National team
Years	Team	Caps	Goals
–	England	87	-
–	Great Britain	38	-
Medal record
Men's field hockey
Representing England
Champions Trophy
Silver medal – second place	2010 Mönchengladbach	Team
European Championship
Bronze medal – third place	2011 Mönchengladbach	Team

James John W. Fair (born 8 January 1981) is an English former field hockey player who played as a goalkeeper for England and Great Britain and competed at the 2012 Summer Olympics.

== Biography ==
Fair was born in Chester, England and from 1989 to 1999 he was educated at The King's School, Chester. He graduated from Birmingham University in 2003 in Geography and Geology.

Fair played club hockey for Cannock in the Men's England Hockey League and while at the club, he made his international debut in 2005, represented England at the 2006 Commonwealth Games in Melbourne and was selected as a travelling reserve to represent Great Britain in the 2008 Summer Olympics, although he did not play any matches. In 2009 he was made goalkeeper of the year by the FIH. Fair also played in the 2010 Commonwealth Games in Delhi. He was part of the silver medal winning England team that competed at the 2010 Men's Hockey Champions Trophy in Mönchengladbach, Germany.

Still at Cannock, Fair represented Great Britain at the 2012 Olympic Games in London. This time he was Great Britain's first choice goalkeeper and started every match. Following Great Britain's defeat 3–1 defeat to Australia in the bronze playoff game, Fair was not one of the five Olympians selected for the England squad chosen to go to the 2012 Champions Trophy. For the 2024/25 season he played for Bromsgrove Hockey Club.

He used to work at Stowe School in Buckinghamshire. He now works at King Edward's School, Birmingham as a Geography Teacher.
