= Scott Sandison =

Canadian field hockey player

Scott Sandison (born February 14, 1979, in Toronto, Ontario) is a field hockey midfielder from Canada. He was a member of the Canadian team that finished tenth at the 2008 Summer Olympics.

== International senior competitions ==
- 2002 — Commonwealth Games, Manchester (6th)
- 2003 — Indoor World Cup, Leipzig (6th)
- 2004 — Olympic Qualifying Tournament, Madrid (11th)
- 2006 — Commonwealth Games, Melbourne (9th)
- 2007 — Pan American Games, Rio de Janeiro (1st)
- 2008 — Olympic Games, Beijing (10th)
