= Germany at the 2004 Summer Olympics =

- IOC code: GER
- NOC: National Olympic Committee for Germany

in Athens
- Competitors: 441 (291 men and 150 women) in 29 sports
- Flag bearer: Ludger Beerbaum
- Medals Ranked 6th: Gold 13 Silver 16 Bronze 20 Total 49

Summer Olympics appearances (overview)
- 1896; 1900; 1904; 1908; 1912; 1920–1924; 1928; 1932; 1936; 1948; 1952; 1956–1988; 1992; 1996; 2000; 2004; 2008; 2012; 2016; 2020; 2024; 2028

Other related appearances
- 1906 Intercalated Games –––– Saar (1952); United Team of Germany (1956–1964); East Germany (1968–1988); West Germany (1968–1988)

Germany competed at the 2004 Summer Olympics in Athens, Greece, from 13 to 29 August 2004. This was the nation's fourth consecutive appearance at the Summer Olympics after its reunification in 1990. The German Olympic Sports Confederation (German: Deutscher Olympischer Sportbund, DOSB) sent the nation's second largest delegation to the Games since its reunification. A total of 441 athletes, 250 men and 191 women, competed in 27 sports, and were nominated by DOSB at four occasions.

== Medalists ==
Medal	Name	Sport	Event	Date
Gold	Yvonne Bönisch	Judo	Women's 57 kg	August 16
Gold	Manfred Kurzer	Shooting	Men's 10 m running target	August 19
Gold	Anna Dogonadze	Gymnastics	Women's trampoline	August 20
Gold	Jens Fiedler; Stefan Nimke; René Wolff	Cycling	Men's team sprint	August 21
Gold	Heike Kemmer; Ulla Salzgeber; Martin Schaudt; Hubertus Schmidt	Equestrian	Team dressage	August 21
Gold	Katrin Rutschow-Stomporowski	Rowing	Women's single sculls	August 21
Gold	Ralf Schumann	Shooting	Men's 25 m rapid fire pistol	August 21
Gold	Kathrin Boron; Kerstin El Qalqili; Meike Evers; Manuela Lutze	Rowing	Women's quadruple sculls	August 22
Gold	Germany women's national field hockey team: Tina Bachmann; Caroline Casaretto; Nadine Ernsting-Krienke; Franziska Gude; Mandy Haase; Natascha Keller; Denise Klecker; Anke Kühn; Badri Latif; Heike Lätzsch; Sonja Lehmann; Silke Müller; Fanny Rinne; Marion Rodewald; Louisa Walter; Julia Zwehl	Field hockey	Women's tournament	August 26
Gold	Christian Gille; Tomasz Wylenzek	Canoeing	Men's C-2 1000 m	August 27
Gold	Birgit Fischer; Carolin Leonhardt; Malke Nollen; Katrin Wagner	Canoeing	Women's K-4 500 m	August 27
Gold	Andreas Dittmer	Canoeing	Men's C-1 500 m	August 28
Gold	Ronald Rauhe; Tim Wieskötter	Canoeing	Men's K-2 500 m	August 28
Silver	Judith Arndt	Cycling	Women's road race	August 15
Silver	Andreas Wels; Tobias Schellenberg	Diving	Men's synchronized 3 m springboard	August 16
Silver	Nadine Kleinert	Athletics	Women's shot put	August 18
Silver	Claudia Bokel; Imke Duplitzer; Britta Heidemann	Fencing	Women's team épée	August 20
Silver	Christian Lusch	Shooting	Men's 50 m rifle prone	August 20
Silver	Britta Oppelt; Peggy Waleska	Rowing	Women's double sculls	August 21
Silver	Lars Conrad; Steffen Driesen; Jens Kruppa; Helge Meeuw*; Thomas Rupprath	Swimming	Men's 4 × 100 m medley relay	August 21
Silver	Nicolas Kiefer; Rainer Schüttler	Tennis	Men's doubles	August 21
Silver	Claudia Blasberg; Daniela Reimer	Rowing	Women's lightweight double sculls	August 22
Silver	Ulla Salzgeber	Equestrian	Individual dressage	August 25
Silver	Steffi Nerius	Athletics	Women's javelin throw	August 27
Silver	Andreas Dittmer	Canoeing	Men's C-1 1000 m	August 27
Silver	Björn Bach; Andreas Ihle; Stefan Ulm; Mark Zabel	Canoeing	Men's K-4 1000 m	August 27
Silver	Marcus Becker; Stefan Henze	Canoeing	Men's C-2 500 m	August 28
Silver	Birgit Fischer; Carolin Leonhardt	Canoeing	Women's K-2 500 m	August 28
Silver	Germany men's national handball team: Torsten Jansen; Stefan Kretzschmar; Volker Zerbe; Christian Zeitz; Frank Von Behren; Daniel Stephan; Christian Schwarzer; Christian Ramota; Klaus-Dieter Petersen; Florian Kehrmann; Jan Olaf Immel; Pascal Hens; Henning Fritz; Mark Dragunski; Markus Baur	Handball	Men's tournament	August 29
Bronze	Julia Matijass	Judo	Women's 48 kg	August 14
Bronze	Stefan Pfannmöller	Canoeing	Men's slalom C-1	August 18
Bronze	Annett Böhm	Judo	Women's 70 kg	August 18
Bronze	Antje Buschschulte; Petra Dallmann; Janina Götz*; Sara Harstick*; Hannah Stockbauer; Franziska van Almsick	Swimming	Women's 4 × 200 m freestyle relay	August 18
Bronze	Michael Jurack	Judo	Men's 100 kg	August 19
Bronze	Anne Poleska	Swimming	Women's 200 m breaststroke	August 19
Bronze	Stefan Nimke	Cycling	Men's track time trial	August 20
Bronze	Antje Buschschulte	Swimming	Women's 200 m backstroke	August 20
Bronze	Henrik Stehlik	Gymnastics	Men's trampoline	August 21
Bronze	Antje Buschschulte; Daniela Götz; Sarah Poewe; Franziska van Almsick	Swimming	Women's 4 × 100 m medley relay	August 21
Bronze	Jörg Fiedler; Sven Schmid; Daniel Strigel	Fencing	Men's team épée	August 22
Bronze	Guido Fulst	Cycling	Men's points race	August 24
Bronze	René Wolff	Cycling	Men's sprint	August 24
Bronze	Christian Ahlmann; Otto Becker; Marco Kutscher	Equestrian	Team jumping	August 24
Bronze	Germany women's national football team: Isabell Bachor; Kerstin Garefrekes; Sarah Günther; Ariane Hingst; Steffi Jones; Renate Lingor; Sandra Minnert; Martina Müller; Viola Odebrecht; Navina Omilade; Conny Pohlers; Silke Rottenberg; Petra Wimbersky; Pia Wunderlich; Sonja Fuss; Birgit Prinz; Kerstin Stegemann	Football	Women's tournament	August 26
Bronze	Sabine Spitz	Cycling	Women's cross-country	August 27
Bronze	Marco Kutscher	Equestrian	Individual jumping	August 27
Bronze	Germany national field hockey team: Clemens Arnold; Christoph Bechmann; Sebastian Biederlack; Philipp Crone; Eike Duckwitz; Christoph Eimer; Björn Emmerling; Florian Kunz; Björn Michel; Sascha Reinelt; Justus Scharowsky; Christian Schulte; Timo Weß; Tibor Weißenborn; Matthias Witthaus; Christopher Zeller	Field hockey	Men's tournament	August 27
Bronze	Rustamhodza Rahimov	Boxing	Flyweight	August 29
Bronze	Vitali Tajbert	Boxing	Featherweight	August 29

Medals by sport
Sport	1st place, gold medalist(s)	2nd place, silver medalist(s)	3rd place, bronze medalist(s)	Total
Canoeing	4	4	1	9
Rowing	2	2	0	4
Shooting	2	1	0	3
Cycling	1	1	4	6
Equestrian	1	1	2	4
Judo	1	0	3	4
Field hockey	1	0	1	2
Gymnastics	1	0	1	2
Athletics	0	2	0	2
Swimming	0	1	4	5
Fencing	0	1	1	2
Diving	0	1	0	1
Handball	0	1	0	1
Tennis	0	1	0	1
Boxing	0	0	2	2
Football	0	0	1	1
Total	13	16	20	49

== Archery ==
Germany has qualified a spot in the men's individual event, and in the women's team.

Athlete	Event	Ranking round		Round of 64	Round of 32	Round of 16	Quarterfinals	Semifinals	Final / BM	
Athlete	Event	Score	Seed	Opposition Score	Opposition Score	Opposition Score	Opposition Score	Opposition Score	Opposition Score	Rank
Michael Frankenberg	Men's individual	657	21	Nevmerzhitskiy (RUS); W 140–135	Cuddihy (AUS); L 163–164	Did not advance				
Anja Hitzler	Women's individual	632	23	Günay (TUR); W 163–152	Wu H-J (TPE); L 156 (8)–156 (9)	Did not advance				
Wiebke Nulle	Women's individual	620	40	Şatır (TUR); L 135 (7)–135 (10)	Did not advance					
Cornelia Pfohl	Women's individual	638	18	Beaudet (CAN); W 146–128	Galinovskaya (RUS); L 156–158	Did not advance				
Anja Hitzler; Wiebke Nulle; Cornelia Pfohl	Women's team	1890	6	—N/a		Russia; W 238–234	Chinese Taipei; L 230–233	Did not advance		

== Athletics ==
German athletes have so far achieved qualifying standards in the following athletics events (up to a maximum of 3 athletes in each event at the 'A' Standard, and 1 at the 'B' Standard).

Key

- Note–Ranks given for track events are within the athlete's heat only
- Q = Qualified for the next round
- q = Qualified for the next round as a fastest loser or, in field events, by position without achieving the qualifying target
- NR = National record
- N/A = Round not applicable for the event
- Bye = Athlete not required to compete in round

Men
Track & road events

Athlete	Event	Heat		Quarterfinal		Semifinal		Final	
Athlete	Event	Result	Rank	Result	Rank	Result	Rank	Result	Rank
Jerome Crews	110 m hurdles	13.83	7	Did not advance					
Andreas Erm	50 km walk	—N/a						DSQ	
Sebastian Ernst	200 m	20.47	1 Q	20.36	3 Q	20.63	5	Did not advance	
Mike Fenner	110 m hurdles	13.53	3 Q	13.53	5	Did not advance			
Till Helmke	200 m	20.73	5 q	20.76	4	Did not advance			
Rene Herms	800 m	1:45.83	2 Q	—N/a		1:47.68	8	Did not advance	
Andre Höhne	20 km walk	—N/a						1:21:56	8
Andre Höhne	50 km walk	—N/a						DNF	
Alexander Kosenkow	100 m	10.28	4 q	10.24	6	Did not advance			
Wolfram Müller	1500 m	3:46.75	9	—N/a		Did not advance			
Ingo Schultz	400 m	45.88	2 Q	—N/a		46.23	7	Did not advance	
Tobias Unger	200 m	20.65	2 Q	20.30	3 Q	20.54	4 Q	20.64	7
Till Helmke; Alexander Kosenkow; Ronny Ostwald; Tobias Unger	4 × 100 m relay	38.64	6	—N/a				Did not advance	
Ruwen Faller; Kamghe Gaba; Ingo Schultz; Bastian Swillims	4 × 400 m relay	3:02.77	3 Q	—N/a				3:02.22	7

Field events

Athlete	Event	Qualification		Final	
Athlete	Event	Distance	Position	Distance	Position
Ralf Bartels	Shot put	20.65	3 Q	20.26	7
Detlef Bock	Shot put	18.89	33	Did not advance	
Lars Börgeling	Pole vault	5.70	1 Q	5.75	6
Danny Ecker	Pole vault	5.70	7 Q	5.75	5
Peter Esenwein	Javelin throw	78.41	20	Did not advance	
Markus Esser	Hammer throw	77.49	5 q	72.51	11
Charles Friedek	Triple jump	NM	—	Did not advance	
Roman Fricke	High jump	2.20	26	Did not advance	
Boris Henry	Javelin throw	DNS		Did not advance	
Karsten Kobs	Hammer throw	76.69	11 q	76.30	8
Tim Lobinger	Pole vault	5.70	12 Q	5.55	11
Michael Möllenbeck	Discus throw	59.79	20	Did not advance	
Christian Nicolay	Javelin throw	79.77	16	Did not advance	
Andreas Pohle	Triple jump	16.29	31	Did not advance	
Lars Riedel	Discus throw	64.20	3 q	62.80	7
Peter Sack	Shot put	19.09	28	Did not advance	
Torsten Schmidt	Discus throw	63.40	6 q	61.18	9
Nils Winter	Long jump	7.52	31	Did not advance	

Combined events – Decathlon

Athlete	Event	100 m	LJ	SP	HJ	400 m	110H	DT	PV	JT	1500 m	Final	Rank
Stefan Drews	Result	10.87	7.38	13.07	1.88	48.51	14.01	40.11	5.00	51.53	4:34.21	7926	19
Stefan Drews	Points	890	905	672	696	885	973	667	910	611	717	7926	19
Dennis Leyckes	Result	11.05	7.05	12.84	1.91	DNS	—	—	—	—	—	DNF	
Dennis Leyckes	Points	850	826	657	723	0	—	—	—	—	—	DNF	
Florian Schönbeck	Result	10.90	7.30	14.77	1.88	50.30	14.34	44.41	5.00	60.89	4:38.82	8077	12
Florian Schönbeck	Points	883	886	776	696	801	931	755	910	751	688	8077	12

Women
Track & road events

Athlete	Event	Heat		Quarterfinal		Semifinal		Final	
Athlete	Event	Result	Rank	Result	Rank	Result	Rank	Result	Rank
Kirsten Bolm	100 m hurdles	12.85	4 q	—N/a		DNF		Did not advance	
Claudia Gesell	800 m	2:03.87	4	—N/a		Did not advance			
Nadine Hentschke	100 m hurdles	13.36	6	—N/a		Did not advance			
Stephanie Kampf	400 m hurdles	DNS		—N/a		Did not advance			
Ulrike Maisch	Marathon	—N/a						DNF	
Irina Mikitenko	5000 m	15:02.16	6 q	—N/a				15:03.36	7
Sabrina Mockenhaupt	10000 m	—N/a						32:00.85	15
Sina Schielke	100 m	11.46	6	Did not advance					
Melanie Seeger	20 km walk	—N/a						1:29:52	5
Juliane Sprenger-Afflerbach	100 m hurdles	13.28	6	—N/a		Did not advance			
Ulrike Urbansky	400 m hurdles	55.15	3 q	—N/a		56.44	7	Did not advance	
Luminita Zaituc	Marathon	—N/a						2:36:45	18
Sabine Zimmer	20 km walk	—N/a						1:31:59	16
Birgit Rockmeier; Sina Schielke; Marion Wagner; Katja Wakan	4 × 100 m relay	43.64	6	—N/a				Did not advance	
Grit Breuer; Claudia Hoffmann; Claudia Marx; Jana Neubert	4 × 400 m relay	3:27.75	4	—N/a				Did not advance	

Field events

Athlete	Event	Qualification		Final	
Athlete	Event	Distance	Position	Distance	Position
Nadine Beckel	Shot put	17.11	22	Did not advance	
Andrea Bunjes	Hammer throw	70.73	6 Q	68.40	11
Franka Dietzsch	Discus throw	58.12	27	Did not advance	
Betty Heidler	Hammer throw	69.81	8 Q	72.73 NR	4
Caroline Hingst	Pole vault	4.30	22	Did not advance	
Bianca Kappler	Long jump	6.69	8 Q	6.66	8
Susanne Keil	Hammer throw	66.35	21	Did not advance	
Nadine Kleinert	Shot put	18.65	5 Q	19.59	2nd place, silver medalist(s)
Astrid Kumbernuss	Shot put	17.89	15	Did not advance	
Floé Kühnert	Pole vault	4.15	=24	Did not advance	
Steffi Nerius	Javelin throw	62.14	5 Q	65.82	2nd place, silver medalist(s)
Christina Obergföll	Javelin throw	60.41	15	Did not advance	
Silke Spiegelburg	Pole vault	4.40	15 q	4.20	=13
Annika Suthe	Javelin throw	58.70	21	Did not advance	

Combined events – Heptathlon

Athlete	Event	100H	HJ	SP	200 m	LJ	JT	800 m	Final	Rank
Karin Ertl	Result	13.52	1.73	13.92	24.71	6.03	44.45	2:18.68	6095	17
Karin Ertl	Points	1047	891	789	914	859	753	842	6095	17
Sonja Kesselschläger	Result	13.38	1.76	14.53	25.23	6.42	42.99	2:15.21	6287	6
Sonja Kesselschläger	Points	1068	928	829	866	981	725	890	6287	6
Claudia Tonn	Result	13.90	1.82	11.92	24.84	6.35	41.12	2:10.77	6155	12
Claudia Tonn	Points	993	1003	656	902	959	689	953	6155	12

== Badminton ==
Men

Athlete	Event	Round of 32	Round of 16	Quarterfinal	Semifinal	Final / BM	
Athlete	Event	Opposition Score	Opposition Score	Opposition Score	Opposition Score	Opposition Score	Rank
Björn Joppien	Singles	Salo (FIN); W 14–17, 15–7, 15–11	Susilo (SIN); L 11–15, 6–15	Did not advance			

Women

Athlete	Event	Round of 32	Round of 16	Quarterfinal	Semifinal	Final / BM	
Athlete	Event	Opposition Score	Opposition Score	Opposition Score	Opposition Score	Opposition Score	Rank
Xu Huaiwen	Singles	Zhou M (CHN); L 11–9, 5–11, 2–11	Did not advance				
Juliane Schenk	Singles	Hallam (GBR); L 7–11, 11–6, 9–11	Did not advance				
Nicole Grether; Juliane Schenk	Doubles	Botts / Edwards (RSA); W 15–0, 15–0	Jørgensen / Olsen (DEN); L 12–15, 17–16, 5–15	Did not advance			

Mixed

Athlete	Event	Round of 32	Round of 16	Quarterfinal	Semifinal	Final / BM	
Athlete	Event	Opposition Score	Opposition Score	Opposition Score	Opposition Score	Opposition Score	Rank
Nicol Pitro; Björn Siegemund	Doubles	Denney / Wilson-Smith (AUS); W 15–5, 8–15, 15–4	Emms / Robertson (GBR); L 11–15, 4–15	Did not advance			

== Boxing ==
Germany sent four boxers to the 2004 Olympics. They won two bronze medals as the team went for a combined record of 6–4. Germany was in a four-way tie for 12th place in the boxing medals scoreboard.

Athlete	Event	Round of 32	Round of 16	Quarterfinals	Semifinals	Final	
Athlete	Event	Opposition Result	Opposition Result	Opposition Result	Opposition Result	Opposition Result	Rank
Rustamhodza Rahimov	Flyweight	Bye	Escandón (COL); W 25–15	Ambunda (NAM); W 28–15	Gamboa (CUB); L 11–20	Did not advance	3rd place, bronze medalist(s)
Vitali Tajbert	Featherweight	Brizuela (ARG); W RSC	Djelkhir (FRA); W 40–26	Franco (CUB); W 34–26	Kim S-G (PRK); L 24–29	Did not advance	3rd place, bronze medalist(s)
Lukas Wilaschek	Middleweight	Pittman (AUS); W 24–23	Mashkin (UKR); L 24–34	Did not advance			
Sebastian Köber	Super heavyweight	—N/a	Dildabekov (KAZ); L 18–28	Did not advance			

== Canoeing ==
Germany entered 19 canoes in the canoeing competition in 2004. 18 qualified for semifinals, 17 qualified for finals, and 16 placed in the top 8. 9 won medals, including 4 gold, 4 silver, and 1 bronze. This made Germany the most successful nation in the Athens canoeing competition.

=== Slalom ===
Athlete	Event	Preliminary						Semifinal		Final			
Athlete	Event	Run 1	Rank	Run 2	Rank	Total	Rank	Time	Rank	Time	Rank	Total	Rank
Stefan Pfannmöller	Men's C-1	104.34	10	101.54	4	205.88	7 Q	96.99	3 Q	94.57	1	191.56	3rd place, bronze medalist(s)
Jens Ewald	Men's K-1	150.69	25	99.40	17	250.09	25	Did not advance					
Thomas Schmidt	Men's K-1	93.28	2	97.36	10	190.64	3 Q	95.11	5 Q	97.82	5	192.93	5
Christian Bahmann; Michael Senft	Men's C-2	116.01	9	114.58	8	230.59	9 Q	107.01	6 Q	106.44	3	213.45	4
Marcus Becker; Stefan Henze	Men's C-2	108.35	5	107.21	3	215.56	5 Q	106.32	4 Q	104.66	1	210.98	2nd place, silver medalist(s)
Jennifer Bongardt	Women's K-1	102.96	1	109.24	4	212.20	1 Q	107.36	3 Q	130.30	9	237.66	9
Mandy Planert	Women's K-1	114.90	7	110.87	6	225.77	6 Q	122.61	14	Did not advance			

=== Sprint ===
Athlete	Event	Heats		Semifinals		Final	
Athlete	Event	Time	Rank	Time	Rank	Time	Rank
Lutz Altepost	K-1 500 m	1:38.859	3 q	1:39.643	2 Q	1:39.647	6
Andreas Dittmer	C-1 500 m	1:49.146	1 Q	Bye		1:46.383	1st place, gold medalist(s)
Andreas Dittmer	C-1 1000 m	3:52.922	1 Q	Bye		3:46.721	2nd place, silver medalist(s)
Björn Goldschmidt	K-1 1000 m	3:31.310	4 q	3:29.561	2 Q	3:34.381	8
Christian Gille; Tomasz Wylenzek	C-2 500 m	1:40.128	1 Q	Bye		1:40.802	5
Christian Gille; Tomasz Wylenzek	C-2 1000 m	3:30.059	1 Q	Bye		3:41.802	1st place, gold medalist(s)
Marco Herszel; Jan Schäfer	K-2 1000 m	3:11.627	3 Q	Bye		3:20.548	6
Ronald Rauhe; Tim Wieskötter	K-2 500 m	1:28.866	1 Q	Bye		1:27.040	1st place, gold medalist(s)
Björn Bach; Andreas Ihle; Stefan Ulm; Mark Zabel	K-4 1000 m	2:52.678	3 Q	Bye		2:58.659	2nd place, silver medalist(s)

Women

Athlete	Event	Heats		Semifinals		Final	
Athlete	Event	Time	Rank	Time	Rank	Time	Rank
Katrin Wagner	K-1 500 m	1:53.234	2 q	1:52.630	1 Q	1:52.557	4
Birgit Fischer; Carolin Leonhardt	K-2 500 m	1:39.588	1 Q	Bye		1:39.533	2nd place, silver medalist(s)
Birgit Fischer; Carolin Leonhardt; Maike Nollen; Katrin Wagner	K-4 500 m	1:31.606	1 Q	Bye		1:34.340	1st place, gold medalist(s)

Qualification Legend: Q = Qualify to final; q = Qualify to semifinal

== Cycling ==
=== Road ===
Men

Athlete	Event	Time	Rank
Andreas Klöden	Road race	Did not finish	
Michael Rich	Road race	Did not finish	
Michael Rich	Time trial	58:09.46	4
Jan Ullrich	Road race	5:41:56	19
Jan Ullrich	Time trial	59:02.04	6
Jens Voigt	Road race	5:50:35	64
Erik Zabel	Road race	5:41:56	4

Women

Athlete	Event	Time	Rank
Judith Arndt	Road race	3:24:31	2nd place, silver medalist(s)
Judith Arndt	Time trial	32:46.94	11
Angela Brodtka	Road race	Did not finish	
Trixi Worrack	Road race	3:25:42	25
Trixi Worrack	Time trial	33:05.72	15

=== Track ===
Sprint

Athlete	Event	Qualification		Round 1	Repechage 1	Round 2	Repechage 2	Quarterfinals	Semifinals	Final	
Athlete	Event	Time Speed (km/h)	Rank	Opposition Time Speed (km/h)	Opposition Time Speed (km/h)	Opposition Time Speed (km/h)	Opposition Time Speed (km/h)	Opposition Time Speed (km/h)	Opposition Time Speed (km/h)	Opposition Time Speed (km/h)	Rank
Stefan Nimke	Men's sprint	11.338; 63.50	19	Bayley (AUS); L	Forde (BAR); Kwiatkowski (POL); L	Did not advance					
René Wolff	Men's sprint	10.230; 70.381	3 Q	Yang H-C (KOR); W 11.101; 64.801	Bye	Forde (BAR); W 10.548; 68.259	Bye	Zieliński (POL); W 10.556, W 10.749	Bos (NED); L, L	Gané (FRA); W 10.677, W 10.612	3rd place, bronze medalist(s)
Katrin Meinke	Women's sprint	11.655; 61.776	11	Tsylinskaya (BLR); L	Hijgenaar (NED); Pendleton (GBR); W 12.132; 59.347	—N/a		Meares (AUS); L, L	Did not advance	5th place final Tsylinskaya (BLR); Krupeckaitė (LTU); Larreal (VEN); L	6
Jens Fiedler; Stefan Nimke; René Wolff	Men's team sprint	44.251; 61.015	2 Q	Great Britain; W 43.955; 61.426	—N/a					Japan; W 43.980; 61.391	1st place, gold medalist(s)

Pursuit

Athlete	Event	Qualification		Semifinals		Final	
Athlete	Event	Time	Rank	Opponent Results	Rank	Opponent Results	Rank
Robert Bartko	Men's individual pursuit	4:18.991	6 Q	McGee (AUS); 4:26.184	8	Did not advance	
Christian Lademann	Men's individual pursuit	4:26.760	11	Did not advance			
Robert Bartko; Guido Fulst; Christian Lademann; Leif Lampater	Men's team pursuit	4:05.823	4 Q	Netherlands; 4:03.785	4 Q	Spain; 4:07.193	4

Time trial

Athlete	Event	Time	Rank
Carsten Bergemann	Men's time trial	1:02.551	8
Stefan Nimke	Men's time trial	1:01.186	3rd place, bronze medalist(s)
Katrin Meinke	Women's time trial	35.088	11

Keirin

Athlete	Event	1st round	Repechage	2nd round	Final
Athlete	Event	Rank	Rank	Rank	Rank
Jens Fiedler	Men's keirin	7 R	2 Q	4	8
René Wolff	Men's keirin	1 Q	Bye	2 Q	5

Omnium

Athlete	Event	Points	Laps	Rank
Guido Fulst	Men's points race	79	3	3rd place, bronze medalist(s)
Katrin Meinke	Women's points race	5	0	9
Robert Bartko; Guido Fulst	Men's madison	9	0	4

=== Mountain biking ===
Athlete	Event	Time	Rank
Carsten Bresser	Men's cross-country	2:25:09	20
Lado Fumic	Men's cross-country	Did not finish	
Manuel Fumic	Men's cross-country	2:20:29	8
Ivonne Kraft	Women's cross-country	2:05:18	7
Sabine Spitz	Women's cross-country	1:45:11	3rd place, bronze medalist(s)

== Diving ==
Germany has qualified 10 athletes, including a single pair in the men's synchronized springboard, and two more in both women's synchronized springboard and platform.

Men

Athlete	Event	Preliminaries		Semifinals		Final	
Athlete	Event	Points	Rank	Points	Rank	Points	Rank
Tobias Schellenberg	3 m springboard	371.85	27	Did not advance			
Andreas Wels	3 m springboard	378.93	23	Did not advance			
Tony Adam	10 m platform	411.30	18 Q	589.65	18	Did not advance	
Heiko Meyer	10 m platform	440.85	9 Q	625.20	10 Q	646.56	7
Tobias Schellenberg; Andreas Wels	3 m synchronized springboard	—N/a				350.01	2nd place, silver medalist(s)

Women

Athlete	Event	Preliminaries		Semifinals		Final	
Athlete	Event	Points	Rank	Points	Rank	Points	Rank
Heike Fischer	3 m springboard	199.71	31	Did not advance			
Ditte Kotzian	3 m springboard	299.50	11 Q	516.60	10 Q	509.52	11
Annett Gamm	10 m platform	301.86	18 Q	478.20	14	Did not advance	
Christin Steuer	10 m platform	256.77	28	Did not advance			
Ditte Kotzian; Conny Schmalfuss	3 m synchronized springboard	—N/a				279.69	6
Annett Gamm; Nora Subschinski	10 m synchronized platform	—N/a				303.30	6

== Equestrian ==
Germany has qualified a spot for the team each in dressage, eventing, and show jumping. Eventing rider Bettina Hoy originally claimed a gold medal for herself and the German team, but three countries filed an appeal on the FEI Ground Jury, that overturned the judges' decision to nullify her original results. Therefore, the German eventing team finished outside the medals in fourth place, and Hoy claimed a ninth spot overall in the official results. Meanwhile, show jumper Ludger Beerbaum and his horse Goldfever helped the Germans claim a gold medal in the team event, but Goldfever tested positive for the prohibited substance betamethasone. As a result, Beerbaum was disqualified from the tournament, and instead, his teammates Christian Ahlmann, Otto Becker, and Marco Kutscher dropped their leading position for the bronze, even without Goldfever's results.

=== Dressage ===
Athlete	Horse	Event	Grand Prix		Grand Prix Special		Grand Prix Freestyle		Overall	
Athlete	Horse	Event	Score	Rank	Score	Rank	Score	Rank	Score	Rank
Heike Kemmer	Bonaparte	Individual	71.292	=10	Did not advance					
Ulla Salzgeber	Rusty	Individual	78.208	1 Q	74.840	3 Q	83.450	2	78.833	2nd place, silver medalist(s)
Martin Schaudt	Weltall	Individual	73.417	4 Q	70.600	14 Q	64.950	15	69.656	15
Hubertus Schmidt	Wansuela Suerte	Individual	72.330	8 Q	73.440	7 Q	78.875	5	74.883	5
Heike Kemmer; Ulla Salzgeber; Martin Schaudt; Hubertus Schmidt	See above	Team	—N/a						74.563	1st place, gold medalist(s)

=== Eventing ===
Athlete	Horse	Event	Dressage		Cross-country			Jumping						Total	
Athlete	Horse	Event	Dressage		Cross-country			Qualifier			Final			Total	
Athlete	Horse	Event	Penalties	Rank	Penalties	Total	Rank	Penalties	Total	Rank	Penalties	Total	Rank	Penalties	Rank
Andreas Dibowski	Little Lemon	Individual	45.40 #	19	3.60 #	49.00 #	21	4.00	53.00	13 Q	10.00	63.00	14	63.00	14
Bettina Hoy	Ringwood Cockatoo	Individual	32.00	=3	3.60 #	35.60	2	14.00 #	49.60	8 Q	6.00	55.60	9	55.60	9
Ingrid Klimke	Sleep Late	Individual	41.00	9	0.00	41.00	6	Retired			Did not advance				
Frank Ostholt	Air Jordan	Individual	41.40	10	1.60	43.00	9	11.00	54.00 #	14	Did not advance			54.00	14
Hinrich Romeike	Marius	Individual	44.40 #	15	0.80	45.20 #	13	0.00	45.20	5 Q	6.00	51.20	5	51.20	5
Andreas Dibowski; Bettina Hoy; Ingrid Klimke; Frank Ostholt; Hinrich Romeike	See above	Team	114.40	3	2.40	119.60	6	15.00	147.80	6	—N/a			147.80	4

"#" indicates that the score of this rider does not count in the team competition, since only the best three results of a team are counted.

=== Show jumping ===
Athlete	Horse	Event	Qualification								Final					Total	
Athlete	Horse	Event	Round 1		Round 2			Round 3			Round A		Round B			Total	
Athlete	Horse	Event	Penalties	Rank	Penalties	Total	Rank	Penalties	Total	Rank	Penalties	Rank	Penalties	Total	Rank	Penalties	Rank
Christian Ahlmann	Cöster	Individual	4	=19	4	8	=16 Q	8	16	=19	Did not advance						
Otto Becker	Dobels Cento	Individual	1	=11	5	6	=13 Q	4	10	=10 Q	8	=12 Q	13	21	=19	21	=19
Ludger Beerbaum	Goldfever	Individual	1	=11	0	1	=2 Q	0	1	2 Q	8	=12 Q	12	20	=16	~~20~~	DSQ
Marco Kutscher	Montender	Individual	8	=47	0	8	=16 Q	0	8	=5 Q	4	=4 Q	5	9	3	9	3rd place, bronze medalist(s)
Christian Ahlmann; Otto Becker; ~~Ludger Beerbaum~~; Marco Kutscher	See above	Team	—N/a								9	1 Q	12	21	3	21	3rd place, bronze medalist(s)

== Fencing ==
Men

Athlete	Event	Round of 64	Round of 32	Round of 16	Quarterfinal	Semifinal	Final / BM	
Athlete	Event	Opposition Score	Opposition Score	Opposition Score	Opposition Score	Opposition Score	Opposition Score	Rank
Jörg Fiedler	Individual épée	Bye	Schmid (GER); L 12–15	Did not advance				
Sven Schmid	Individual épée	Bye	Fiedler (GER); W 15–12	Wang L (CHN); L 11–15	Did not advance			
Daniel Strigel	Individual épée	Bye	Imre (HUN); W 15–13	Karyuchenko (UKR); W 15–12	Wang L (CHN); L 14–15	Did not advance		
Jörg Fiedler; Sven Schmid; Daniel Strigel	Team épée	—N/a			China; W 39–32	France; L 44–45	Russia; W 37–29	3rd place, bronze medalist(s)
Ralf Bißdorf	Individual foil	Bye	Ganeyev (RUS); L 11–15	Did not advance				
Peter Joppich	Individual foil	Bye	Nagaty (EGY); W 15–10	Choi B-C (KOR); W 15–10	Guyart (FRA); L 12–15	Did not advance		
André Weßels	Individual foil	Bye	Park H-K (KOR); L 13–15	Did not advance				
Ralf Bißdorf; Peter Joppich; André Weßels; Simon Senft	Team foil	—N/a			United States; L 43–45	Classification semi-final South Korea; W 45–40	5th place final France; L 38–45	6

Women

Athlete	Event	Round of 64	Round of 32	Round of 16	Quarterfinal	Semifinal	Final / BM	
Athlete	Event	Opposition Score	Opposition Score	Opposition Score	Opposition Score	Opposition Score	Opposition Score	Rank
Claudia Bokel	Individual épée	Bye	Sidiropoulou (GRE); W 15–10	Duplitzer (GER); L 13–14	Did not advance			
Imke Duplitzer	Individual épée	Bye	Kim M-J (KOR); W 15–9	Bokel (GER); W 14–13	Nisima (FRA); L 14–15	Did not advance		
Britta Heidemann	Individual épée	Bye	Espinosa (COL); W 15–3	Mincza-Nébald (HUN); L 10–11	Did not advance			
Claudia Bokel; Imke Duplitzer; Britta Heidemann	Team épée	—N/a			Greece; W 33–32	France; W 33–32	Russia; L 28–34	2nd place, silver medalist(s)
Simone Bauer	Individual foil	—N/a	Ohayon (ISR); W 15–10	Gruchała (POL); L 9–15	Did not advance			
Susanne König	Individual sabre	—N/a	Bond-Williams (GBR); L 13–15	Did not advance				

== Field hockey ==
=== Men's tournament ===
Roster

The following is the German roster in the men's field hockey tournament of the 2004 Summer Olympics.

Head coach: Bernhard Peters

1. Clemens Arnold (GK)
2. Christian Schulte (GK)
4. Philipp Crone
6. Eike Duckwitz
7. Björn Michel
8. Sascha Reinelt
10. Christoph Eimer
11. Björn Emmerling
12. Sebastian Biederlack
14. Tibor Weißenborn
15. Florian Kunz (C)
17. Timo Weß
18. Christoph Bechmann
19. Christopher Zeller
22. Matthias Witthaus
26. Justus Scharowsky

Group play

Pos	Team	Pld	W	D	L	GF	GA	GD	Pts	Qualification
1	Spain	5	3	2	0	14	3	+11	11	Semi-finals
2	Germany	5	3	2	0	15	6	+9	11	Semi-finals
3	Pakistan	5	3	0	2	19	8	+11	9	5–8th place semi-finals
4	South Korea	5	2	2	1	17	8	+9	8	5–8th place semi-finals
5	Great Britain	5	1	0	4	9	21	−12	3	9–12th place semi-finals
6	Egypt	5	0	0	5	2	30	−28	0	9–12th place semi-finals

Source: FIH

15 August 2004
18:30

Germany	2 – 1	Pakistan
Emmerling 7'; Michel 31'	Report	Butt 43'

Umpires:
Ray O'Connor (IRL)
John Wright (RSA)

17 August 2004
20:30

Spain	1 – 1	Germany
Freixa 28'	Report	Bechmann 64'

Umpires:
Henrik Ehlers (DEN)
Murray Grime (AUS)

19 August 2004
18:00

Germany	6 – 1	Egypt
Zeller 17', 67'; Witthaus 38'; Kunz 46'; Bechmann 49', 58'	Report	Enaba 24'

Umpires:
Xavier Adell (ESP)
David Gentles (AUS)

21 August 2004
20:30

Germany	4 – 1	Great Britain
Zeller 21', 39'; Witthaus 38'; Scharowsky 52'	Report	Moodie 60'

Umpires:
Jason McCracken (NZL)
Sumesh Putra (CAN)

23 August 2004
18:30

South Korea	2 – 2	Germany
Lee Jung-Seon 8', 54'	Report	Zeller 35'; Emmerling 66'

Umpires:
Henrik Ehlers (DEN)
John Wright (RSA)

Semifinal

25 August 2004
18:30

Netherlands	3 – 2	Germany
Taekema 5'; Eikelboom 47'; De Nooijer 52'	Report	Witthaus 3'; Bechmann 58'

Umpires:
Murray Grime (AUS)
Ray O'Connor (IRL)

Bronze Medal Final

27 August 2004
18:00

Germany	4 – 3 (a.e.t.)	Spain
Reinelt 22'; Duckwitz 45'; Emmerling 49'; Michel 80'	Report	Freixa 31'; Tubau 39', 47'

Umpires:
Murray Grime (AUS)
Henrik Ehlers (DEN)

Won Bronze Medal

=== Women's tournament ===
Roster

The following is the German roster in the women's field hockey tournament of the 2004 Summer Olympics.

Head coach: Markus Weise

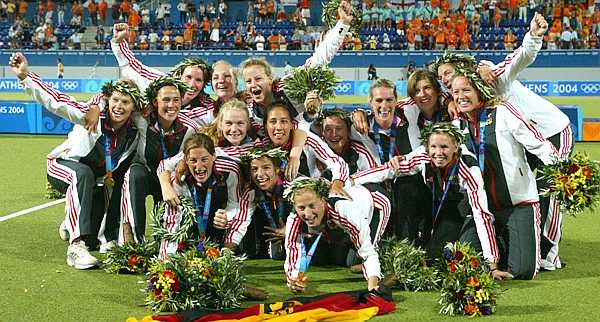
Germany wins gold in women's field hockey.

2. Tina Bachmann
3. Denise Klecker
4. Mandy Haase
5. Nadine Ernsting-Krienke
6. Caroline Casaretto
7. Natascha Keller
10. Silke Müller
13. Marion Rodewald (C)
15. Heike Lätzsch
16. Fanny Rinne
17. Louisa Walter (GK)
18. Anke Kühn
21. Badri Latif
23. Julia Zwehl (GK)
27. Sonja Lehmann
32. Franziska Gude

Group play

Pos	Team	Pld	W	D	L	GF	GA	GD	Pts	Qualification
1	Netherlands	4	4	0	0	14	5	+9	12	Semi-finals
2	Germany	4	2	0	2	6	10	−4	6	Semi-finals
3	South Korea	4	1	1	2	9	8	+1	4	
4	Australia	4	1	1	2	6	5	+1	4	
5	South Africa	4	1	0	3	5	12	−7	3	

Source: FIH
Rules for classification: 1) Points; 2) Matches won; 3) Goal difference; 4) Goals for; 5) Head-to-head result.

14 August 2004
18:00

Australia	1 – 2	Germany
Towers 58'	Report	Ernsting-Krienke 21'; Müller 34'

Umpires:
Soledad Iparraguirre (ARG)
Chieko Akiyama (JPN)

18 August 2004
10:30

Netherlands	4 – 1	Germany
Scheepstra 7'; Boomgaardt 19'; Van Geenhuizen 21'; Karres 29'	Report	Ernsting-Krienke 40'

Umpires:
Chieko Akiyama (JPN)
Marelize de Klerk (RSA)

20 August 2004
18:00

Germany	0 – 3	South Africa
	Report	Wehmeyer 4'; Coetzee 45'; Wilson 56'

Umpires:
Lyn Farrell (NZL)
Sarah Garnett (NZL)

22 August 2004
08:30

Germany	3 – 2	South Korea
Kühn 11'; Gude 30'; Casaretto 59'	Report	Park Mi-Hyun 32'; Kim Seong-Eun 70'

Umpires:
Carolina de la Fuente (ARG)
Soledad Iparraguirre (ARG)

Semifinal

24 August 2004
20:30

China	0 – 0 (a.e.t.)	Germany
	Report
Penalties
Fu Baorong (penalty shoot-out scored); Gao Lihua (penalty shoot-out missed); Mai Shaoyan (penalty shoot-out scored); Tang Chunling (penalty shoot-out scored); Zhou Wanfeng (penalty shoot-out missed)	3 – 4	(penalty shoot-out scored) Rinne; (penalty shoot-out scored) Klecker; (penalty shoot-out scored) Bachmann; (penalty shoot-out scored) Keller; (penalty shoot-out missed) Gude

Umpires:
Marelize de Klerk (RSA)
Soledad Iparraguirre (ARG)

Gold Medal Final

26 August 2004
20:30

Netherlands	1 – 2	Germany
Scheepstra 38'	Report	Kühn 6'; Gude 20'

Umpires:
Marelize de Klerk (RSA)
Soledad Iparraguirre (ARG)

Won Gold Medal

== Football ==
=== Women's tournament ===
Roster

Head coach: Tina Theune-Meyer

Germany named a squad of 18 players and 4 alternates for the tournament.

No.	Pos.	Player	Date of birth (age)	Caps	Goals	Club
1	GK	Silke Rottenberg	25 January 1972 (aged 32)	90	0	(German Football Association) FCR Duisburg
2	DF	Kerstin Stegemann	29 September 1977 (aged 26)	113	3	(German Football Association) FFC Heike Rheine
3	MF	Kerstin Garefrekes	4 September 1979 (aged 24)	31	10	(German Football Association) 1. FFC Frankfurt
4	DF	Steffi Jones	22 December 1972 (aged 31)	78	5	(German Football Association) 1. FFC Frankfurt
5	DF	Sarah Günther	25 January 1983 (aged 21)	7	0	(German Football Association) Hamburger SV
6	MF	Viola Odebrecht	11 February 1983 (aged 21)	15	1	(German Football Association) 1. FFC Turbine Potsdam
7	MF	Pia Wunderlich	26 January 1975 (aged 29)	88	19	(German Football Association) 1. FFC Frankfurt
8	FW	Petra Wimbersky	9 November 1982 (aged 21)	25	3	(German Football Association) 1. FFC Turbine Potsdam
9	FW	Birgit Prinz (captain)	25 October 1977 (aged 26)	116	72	(German Football Association) 1. FFC Frankfurt
10	MF	Renate Lingor	11 October 1975 (aged 28)	78	15	(German Football Association) 1. FFC Frankfurt
11	FW	Martina Müller	18 April 1980 (aged 24)	37	20	(German Football Association) SC 07 Bad Neuenahr
12	MF	Navina Omilade	3 November 1981 (aged 22)	27	0	(German Football Association) 1. FFC Turbine Potsdam
13	DF	Sandra Minnert	7 April 1973 (aged 31)	109	13	(German Football Association) SC 07 Bad Neuenahr
14	FW	Isabell Bachor	10 July 1983 (aged 21)	7	1	(German Football Association) SC 07 Bad Neuenahr
15	DF	Sonja Fuss	5 November 1978 (aged 25)	25	1	(German Football Association) FSV Frankfurt
16	FW	Conny Pohlers	16 November 1978 (aged 25)	17	12	(German Football Association) 1. FFC Turbine Potsdam
17	DF	Ariane Hingst	25 July 1979 (aged 25)	91	9	(German Football Association) 1. FFC Turbine Potsdam
18	GK	Nadine Angerer	10 November 1978 (aged 25)	30	0	(German Football Association) 1. FFC Turbine Potsdam

Group play

Pos	Team	Pld	W	D	L	GF	GA	GD	Pts	Qualification
1	Germany	2	2	0	0	10	0	+10	6	Qualified for the quarterfinals
2	Mexico	2	0	1	1	1	3	−2	1	Qualified for the quarterfinals
3	China	2	0	1	1	1	9	−8	1	

August 11, 2004
18:00

Germany	8 – 0	China
Prinz 13', 21', 73', 88'; Wunderlich 65'; Lingor 76' (pen.); Pohlers 82'; Müller 90'	Report

Pampeloponnisiako Stadium, Patras
Attendance: 14.657
Referee: Seitz (USA)
August 17, 2004
18:00

Germany	2 – 0	Mexico
Wimbersky 20'; Prinz 79'	Report

Karaiskaki Stadium, Piraeus
Attendance: 26.338
Referee: Szokolaia (Hungary)

Quarterfinal

August 20, 2004
18:00

Germany	2 – 1	Nigeria
Jones 76'; Pohlers 81'	Report	Akide 49'

Pampeloponnisiako Stadium, Patras
Attendance: 2.531
Referee: D'Coth (India)

Semifinal

August 23, 2004
18:00

United States	2 – 1 (a.e.t.)	Germany
Lilly 33'; O'Reilly 99'	Report	Bachor 90+2'

Pankritio Stadium, Heraklio
Attendance: 5.165
Referee: Szokolai (Australia)

Bronze Medal Final

August 26, 2004
18:00

Germany	1 – 0	Sweden
Lingor 17'	Report

Karaiskaki Stadium, Piraeus
Attendance: 10,416
Referee: Kari Seitz (United States)

Won Bronze Medal

== Gymnastics ==
=== Artistic ===
Men
Team

Athlete	Event	Qualification								Final							
Athlete	Event	Apparatus						Total	Rank	Apparatus						Total	Rank
Athlete	Event	F	PH	R	V	PB	HB	Total	Rank	F	PH	R	V	PB	HB	Total	Rank
Thomas Andergassen	Team	—N/a	9.712	9.587	—N/a	9.537	—N/a			—N/a	9.625	9.237	—N/a	9.225	—N/a		
Matthias Fahrig	Team	9.475	—N/a		9.000	9.212	9.562	—N/a		8.400	—N/a		9.562	—N/a	9.225	—N/a	
Fabian Hambüchen	Team	9.637	9.075	8.537	9.475	9.600	9.737 Q	56.061	21 Q	8.837	—N/a		9.425	9.512	9.775	—N/a	
Robert Juckel	Team	9.175	9.425	9.550	9.237	—N/a	9.687	—N/a		—N/a	9.437	9.612	—N/a		9.700	—N/a	
Sven Kwiatkowski	Team	9.362	9.087	9.075	9.462	9.362	9.487	55.835	24	—N/a			9.375	9.275	—N/a		
Sergei Pfeifer	Team	9.400	9.575	9.587	9.150	9.150	9.125	55.987	23 Q	9.275	8.700	9.175	—N/a				
Total	Team	37.874	37.799	37.799	37.324	37.711	38.473	226.980	8 Q	26.512	27.762	28.024	28.362	28.012	28.700	167.372	8

Individual finals

Athlete	Event	Apparatus						Total	Rank
Athlete	Event	F	PH	R	V	PB	HB	Total	Rank
Fabian Hambüchen	All-around	9.472	8.287	8.512	9.412	9.387	9.750	54.823	23
Fabian Hambüchen	Horizontal bar	—N/a					9.700	9.700	7
Sergei Pfeifer	All-around	9.312	9.025	9.587	9.087	9.162	9.212	55.385	21

Women

Athlete	Event	Qualification						Final					
Athlete	Event	Apparatus				Total	Rank	Apparatus				Total	Rank
Athlete	Event	V	UB	BB	F	Total	Rank	V	UB	BB	F	Total	Rank
Lisa Brüggemann	All-around	9.100	9.250	8.837	8.612	35.799	41	Did not advance					
Yvonne Musik	All-around	9.125	8.887	8.562	9.037	35.611	45	Did not advance					

=== Rhythmic ===
Athlete	Event	Qualification						Final					
Athlete	Event	Hoop	Ball	Clubs	Ribbon	Total	Rank	Hoop	Ball	Clubs	Ribbon	Total	Rank
Lisa Ingildeeva	Individual	22.825	22.900	22.150	19.650	87.525	19	Did not advance					

=== Trampoline ===
Athlete	Event	Qualification		Final	
Athlete	Event	Score	Rank	Score	Rank
Henrik Stehlik	Men's	69.10	1 Q	40.80	3rd place, bronze medalist(s)
Anna Dogonadze	Women's	66.70	2 Q	39.60	1st place, gold medalist(s)

== Handball ==
=== Men's tournament ===
Roster

The following is the Germany roster in the men's handball tournament of the 2004 Summer Olympics.

Head coaches: Heiner Brand

No.	Pos.	Name	Date of birth (age)	Height	App.	Goals	Club
1	GK	Henning Fritz	21 September 1974 (aged 29)	1.89 m			(Germany) THW Kiel
2	LB	Pascal Hens	26 March 1980 (aged 24)	2.03 m			(Germany) HSV Hamburg
4	P	Mark Dragunski	22 December 1970 (aged 33)	2.14 m			(Germany) VfL Gummersbach
5	LW	Stefan Kretzschmar	17 February 1973 (aged 31)	1.96 m			(Germany) SC Magdeburg
7	LB	Jan Olaf Immel	14 March 1976 (aged 28)	2.02 m			(Germany) SG Wallau-Massenheim
8	P	Christian Schwarzer	23 October 1969 (aged 34)	1.96 m			(Germany) TBV Lemgo
9	P	Klaus-Dieter Petersen	6 November 1968 (aged 35)	1.98 m			(Germany) THW Kiel
10	LB	Frank von Behren	28 September 1976 (aged 27)	1.98 m			(Germany) VfL Gummersbach
11	RB	Volker Zerbe	30 June 1968 (aged 36)	2.11 m			(Germany) TBV Lemgo
12	GK	Christian Ramota	14 April 1973 (aged 31)	2.00 m			(Germany) TBV Lemgo
13	CB	Markus Baur	22 January 1971 (aged 33)	1.90 m			(Germany) TBV Lemgo
14	RB	Christian Zeitz	18 November 1980 (aged 23)	1.86 m			(Germany) THW Kiel
15	LW	Torsten Jansen	23 December 1976 (aged 27)	1.85 m			(Germany) HSV Hamburg
18	LB	Daniel Stephan	3 August 1973 (aged 31)	1.98 m			(Germany) TBV Lemgo
19	RW	Florian Kehrmann	26 June 1977 (aged 27)	1.85 m			(Germany) TBV Lemgo

Group play

Pos	Team	Pld	W	D	L	GF	GA	GD	Pts	Qualification
1	France	5	5	0	0	135	108	+27	10	Quarterfinals
2	Hungary	5	4	0	1	132	124	+8	8	Quarterfinals
3	Germany	5	3	0	2	139	110	+29	6	Quarterfinals
4	Greece (H)	5	2	0	3	117	130	−13	4	Quarterfinals
5	Brazil	5	1	0	4	105	133	−28	2	
6	Egypt	5	0	0	5	110	133	−23	0	

Rules for classification: 1) Points; 2) Head-to-head points; 3) Head-to-head goal difference; 4) Head-to-head goals scored; 5) Goal difference; 6) Goals scored; 7) Draw.
(H) Hosts

14 August 2004; 16:30	Germany	28 - 18	Greece	Sports Pavilion, Athens; Referees: Breto, Huelin Trillo (ESP)
14 August 2004; 16:30	Schwarzer, Kehrmann 6	(15-8)	Grammatikos 5	Sports Pavilion, Athens; Referees: Breto, Huelin Trillo (ESP)
14 August 2004; 16:30	2× (yellow card) 5× (suspension)		3× (yellow card) 3× (suspension)	Sports Pavilion, Athens; Referees: Breto, Huelin Trillo (ESP)

16 August 2004; 21:30	Egypt	14 - 26	Germany	Sports Pavilion, Athens; Referees: Arnaldsson, Vidarsson (ISL)
16 August 2004; 21:30	Yosry 4	(5-14)	3 players with 5	Sports Pavilion, Athens; Referees: Arnaldsson, Vidarsson (ISL)
16 August 2004; 21:30	3× (yellow card) 11× (suspension) 1× (red card)		3× (yellow card) 8× (suspension) 1× (red card)	Sports Pavilion, Athens; Referees: Arnaldsson, Vidarsson (ISL)

18 August 2004; 21:30	Germany	34 – 21	Brazil	Sports Pavilion, Athens; Referees: Pozeznik, Repensek (SLO)
18 August 2004; 21:30	Kretzschmar, Stephan 7	(18-12)	Souza 7	Sports Pavilion, Athens; Referees: Pozeznik, Repensek (SLO)
18 August 2004; 21:30	2× (yellow card) 3× (suspension)		3× (yellow card) 3× (suspension)	Sports Pavilion, Athens; Referees: Pozeznik, Repensek (SLO)

20 August 2004; 16:30	Hungary	30 – 29	Germany	Sports Pavilion, Athens; Referees: Boye, Jensen (DEN)
20 August 2004; 16:30	Nagy 11	(17-14)	Kretzschmar 8	Sports Pavilion, Athens; Referees: Boye, Jensen (DEN)
20 August 2004; 16:30	3× (yellow card) 4× (suspension)		3× (yellow card) 6× (suspension)	Sports Pavilion, Athens; Referees: Boye, Jensen (DEN)

22 August 2004; 14:30	Germany	22 - 27	France	Sports Pavilion, Athens; Referees: Oie, Togstad (NOR)
22 August 2004; 14:30	Schwarzer, Kehrmann 5	(12-11)	Fernandez 6	Sports Pavilion, Athens; Referees: Oie, Togstad (NOR)
22 August 2004; 14:30	2× (yellow card) 4× (suspension)		2× (yellow card) 4× (suspension)	Sports Pavilion, Athens; Referees: Oie, Togstad (NOR)

Quarterfinal

24 August 2004
19:30
Germany
32 - 30 (ET)
Spain
Sports Pavilion, Athens
Referees: Arnaldsson, Vidarsson (ISL)
Schwarzer, Stephan 9
(15-16)
García 7
3× (yellow card) 4× (suspension)

3× (yellow card) 4× (suspension)

FT: 27-27 ET: 28-28, 30-30

Semifinal

27 August 2004; 16:30	Germany	21 - 15	Russia	Helliniko Olympic Indoor Arena; Referees: Bord, Buy (FRA)
27 August 2004; 16:30	Kretzschmar 5	(9-10)	Torgovanov 5	Helliniko Olympic Indoor Arena; Referees: Bord, Buy (FRA)
27 August 2004; 16:30	3× (yellow card) 4× (suspension) 1× (red card)		2× (yellow card) 3× (suspension)	Helliniko Olympic Indoor Arena; Referees: Bord, Buy (FRA)

Gold Medal Final

29 August 2004; 16:45	Croatia	26 - 24	Germany	Helliniko Olympic Indoor Arena; Referees: Hansson, Olsson (SWE)
29 August 2004; 16:45	Džomba 9	(11-12)	Kretzschmar 9	Helliniko Olympic Indoor Arena; Referees: Hansson, Olsson (SWE)
29 August 2004; 16:45	3× (yellow card) 2× (suspension)		3× (yellow card) 5× (suspension)	Helliniko Olympic Indoor Arena; Referees: Hansson, Olsson (SWE)

Won Silver Medal

== Judo ==
Germany has qualified twelve judoka (five men and seven women).

Men

Athlete	Event	Round of 32	Round of 16	Quarterfinals	Semifinals	Repechage 1	Repechage 2	Repechage 3	Final / BM	
Athlete	Event	Opposition Result	Opposition Result	Opposition Result	Opposition Result	Opposition Result	Opposition Result	Opposition Result	Opposition Result	Rank
Oliver Gussenberg	−60 kg	Novikau (BLR); W 1010–0100	Nomura (JPN); L 0000–1000	Did not advance		Lara (DOM); W 0012–0000	Albarracín (ARG); W 1000–0000	Choi (KOR); L 0000–1110	Did not advance	
Florian Wanner	−81 kg	Boissard (DOM); W 1001–0000	Benikhlef (ALG); W 1002–0000	Hontyuk (UKR); L 0000–1020	Did not advance	Bye	Belgaïd (MAR); W 0013–0001	Azizov (AZE); L 0000–1000	Did not advance	
Gerhard Dempf	−90 kg	Huizinga (NED); L 0000–1000	Did not advance							
Michael Jurack	−100 kg	Iliadis (GRE); W 1000–0000	Despaigne (CUB); W 1001–0000	Lemaire (FRA); W 0020–0012	Jang (KOR); L 0000–1001	Bye			Miraliyev (AZE); W 1030–0001	3rd place, bronze medalist(s)
Andreas Tölzer	+100 kg	Suzuki (JPN); L 0010–0120	Did not advance			Papaioannou (GRE); W 0200–0000	Rybak (BLR); W 1000–0000	van der Geest (NED); L 0000–1000	Did not advance	

Women

Athlete	Event	Round of 32	Round of 16	Quarterfinals	Semifinals	Repechage 1	Repechage 2	Repechage 3	Final / BM	
Athlete	Event	Opposition Result	Opposition Result	Opposition Result	Opposition Result	Opposition Result	Opposition Result	Opposition Result	Opposition Result	Rank
Julia Matijass	−48 kg	Bye	Lepage (CAN); W 1100–0000	Ye G-R (KOR); W 1000–0000	Jossinet (FRA); L 0000–1000	Bye			Karagiannopoulou (GRE); W 1000–0000	3rd place, bronze medalist(s)
Raffaella Imbriani	−52 kg	Minkin (USA); W 0001–0000	Tselaridou (GRE); W 1002–0000	Xian Dm (CHN); L 0221–0010	Did not advance	Bye	Souakri (ALG); L 0001–0110	Did not advance		
Yvonne Bönisch	−57 kg	Fernández (ESP); W 0121–0011	García (PUR); W 1000–0000	Kusakabe (JPN); W 0200–0000	Gravenstijn (NED); W 1000–0000	Bye			Kye S-H (PRK); W 0011–0010	1st place, gold medalist(s)
Anna von Harnier	−63 kg	Chisholm (CAN); L 0001–1000	Did not advance							
Annett Böhm	−70 kg	Bye	Qin Dy (CHN); W 1011–0001	Roberge (CAN); W 0011–0000	Bosch (NED); L 0000–0110	Bye			Jacques (BEL); W 1000–0000	3rd place, bronze medalist(s)
Uta Kühnen	−78 kg	Bye	Laborde (CUB); L 0001–0011	Did not advance						
Sandra Köppen	+78 kg	Polavder (SLO); W 1010–0000	Chalá (ECU); L 0001–0010	Did not advance						

== Modern pentathlon ==
Germany has qualified three athletes in modern pentathlon.

Athlete	Event	Shooting (10 m air pistol)			Fencing (épée one touch)			Swimming (200 m freestyle)			Riding (show jumping)			Running (3000 m)			Total points	Final rank
Athlete	Event	Points	Rank	MP Points	Results	Rank	MP points	Time	Rank	MP points	Penalties	Rank	MP points	Time	Rank	MP Points	Total points	Final rank
Steffen Gebhardt	Men's	183	4	1132	13–18	=23	748	2:12.84	26	1208	112	13	1088	10:08.81	25	968	5144	17
Eric Walther	Men's	168	29	952	16–15	=11	832	2:02.03	3	1336	84	7	1116	9:39.36	4	1084	5320	7
Kim Raisner	Women's	178	9	1072	16–15	=12	832	2:18.16	6	1264	84	12	1116	11:13.21	13	1028	5312	5

== Rowing ==
Men

Athlete	Event	Heats		Repechage		Semifinals		Final	
Athlete	Event	Time	Rank	Time	Rank	Time	Rank	Time	Rank
Marcel Hacker	Single sculls	7:17.55	1 SA/B/C	Bye		6:55.98	3 FB	6:47.26	7
Jan Herzog; Tobias Kühne	Pair	7:14.16	4 R	6:28.40	1 SA/B	6:25.47	1 FA	6:46.50	6
René Bertram; Christian Schreiber	Double sculls	6:58.22	4 R	6:16.94	3 SA/B	6:20.70	5 FB	6:14.97	9
Manuel Brehmer; Ingo Euler	Lightweight double sculls	6:25.22	3 R	6:21.57	3 SC/D	6:23.22	1 FC	6:45.62	13
Bernd Heidicker; Philipp Stüer; Sebastian Thormann; Jochen Urban	Four	6:33.14	3 SA/B	Bye		5:54.45	4 FB	5:48.52	7
Marco Geisler; Robert Sens; Stephan Volkert; André Willms	Quadruple sculls	5:43.17	1 SA/B	Bye		5:42.85	2 FA	6:07.04	5
Andreas Bech; Stefan Locher; Martin Müller-Fackle; Axel Schuster	Lightweight four	5:52.68	3 SA/B	Bye		6:03.08	5 FB	6:23.28	11
Jan-Martin Bröer; Jörg Dießner; Thorsten Engelmann; Stephan Koltzk; Michael Ruhe; Sebastian Schulte; Enrico Schnabel; Ulf Siemes; Peter Thiede (cox)	Eight	5:27.72	3 R	5:33.07	2 FA	—N/a		5:49.43	4

Women

Athlete	Event	Heats		Repechage		Semifinals		Final	
Athlete	Event	Time	Rank	Time	Rank	Time	Rank	Time	Rank
Katrin Rutschow-Stomporowski	Single sculls	7:35.20	1 SA/B	Bye		7:30.82	1 FA	7:18.12	1st place, gold medalist(s)
Maren Derlien; Sandra Goldbach	Pair	7:44.00	3 R	7:11.30	2 FA	—N/a		7:20.20	5
Britta Oppelt; Peggy Waleska	Double sculls	7:28.89	1 FA	Bye		—N/a		7:02.78	2nd place, silver medalist(s)
Claudia Blasberg; Daniela Reimer	Lightweight double sculls	6:52.47	1 SA/B	Bye		6:53.43	3 FA	6:57.33	2nd place, silver medalist(s)
Kathrin Boron; Kerstin El Qalqili; Meike Evers; Manuela Lutze	Quadruple sculls	6:16.49	1 FA	Bye		—N/a		6:29.29	1st place, gold medalist(s)
Silke Günther; Elke Hipler; Britta Holthaus; Anja Pyritz; Annina Ruppel (cox); Susanne Schmidt; Maja Tucholke; Nicole Zimmermann; Lenka Wech	Eight	5:59.75	3 R	6:06.86	2 FA	—N/a		6:21.99	5

Qualification Legend: FA=Final A (medal); FB=Final B (non-medal); FC=Final C (non-medal); FD=Final D (non-medal); FE=Final E (non-medal); FF=Final F (non-medal); SA/B=Semifinals A/B; SC/D=Semifinals C/D; SE/F=Semifinals E/F; R=Repechage

== Sailing ==
Men

Athlete	Event	Race											Net points	Final rank
Athlete	Event	1	2	3	4	5	6	7	8	9	10	M*	Net points	Final rank
Toni Wilhelm	Mistral	27	26	25	29	17	31	29	~~OCS~~	20	21	OCS	260	30
Michael Fellmann	Finn	14	11	12	2	9	17	19	19	~~25~~	21	3	127	17
Felix Krabbe; Lucas Zellmer	470	17	16	10	11	5	19	10	~~23~~	8	11	7	114	11
Alexander Hagen; Jochen Wolfram	Star	6	~~17~~	13	8	15	11	7	13	13	12	12	110	16

Women

Athlete	Event	Race											Net points	Final rank
Athlete	Event	1	2	3	4	5	6	7	8	9	10	M*	Net points	Final rank
Amelie Lux	Mistral	~~18~~	17	15	8	8	9	10	2	6	6	6	87	7
Petra Niemann	Europe	12	8	10	10	7	10	8	5	13	~~16~~	13	96	10
Monika Leu; Stefanie Rothweiler	470	13	15	8	1	18	4	11	10	~~20~~	15	14	109	15
Anna Höll; Veronika Lochbrunner; Kristin Wagner	Yngling	9	8	2	12	1	7	~~15~~	5	11	13	8	76	6

Open

Athlete	Event	Race																Net points	Final rank
Athlete	Event	1	2	3	4	5	6	7	8	9	10	11	12	13	14	15	M*	Net points	Final rank
Marcus Baur; Max Groy	49er	9	2	1	8	14	~~16~~	15	11	16	2	12	6	5	14	~~20~~	1	116	9
Roland Gäbler; Gunnar Struckmann	Tornado	6	8	~~15~~	3	13	10	13	9	10	11	—N/a					11	94	11

M = Medal race; OCS = On course side of the starting line; DSQ = Disqualified; DNF = Did not finish; DNS= Did not start; RDG = Redress given

== Shooting ==
Men

Athlete	Event	Qualification		Final	
Athlete	Event	Points	Rank	Points	Rank
Karsten Bindrich	Trap	117	=14	Did not advance	
Artur Gevorgjan	10 m air pistol	573	=30	Did not advance	
Maik Eckhardt	10 m air rifle	595	=5 Q	696.3*	5
Maik Eckhardt	50 m rifle prone	596	=4 Q	697.6	6
Maik Eckhardt	50 m rifle 3 positions	1157	=19	Did not advance	
Michael Jakosits	10 m running target	578	6 Q	676.7	5
Olaf Kirchstein	Trap	119	7	Did not advance	
Torsten Krebs	10 m air rifle	593	=12	Did not advance	
Manfred Kurzer	10 m running target	590 WR	1 Q	682.4	1st place, gold medalist(s)
Christian Lusch	50 m rifle prone	598	=2 Q	702.2	2nd place, silver medalist(s)
Christian Lusch	50 m rifle 3 positions	1161	=12	Did not advance	
Waldemar Schanz	Double trap	135	=4 Q	175	6
Ralf Schumann	25 m rapid fire pistol	592	=1 Q	694.9	1st place, gold medalist(s)
Frank Seeger	50 m pistol	553	=18	Did not advance	
Marco Spangenberg	25 m rapid fire pistol	581	10	Did not advance	
Abdulla Ustaoglu	10 m air pistol	576	=23	Did not advance	
Abdulla Ustaoglu	50 m pistol	550	=24	Did not advance	
Axel Wegner	Skeet	117	=31	Did not advance	

* Won in shoot-off

Women

Athlete	Event	Qualification		Final	
Athlete	Event	Points	Rank	Points	Rank
Dorothee Bauer	10 m air rifle	392	=22	Did not advance	
Munkhbayar Dorjsuren	10 m air pistol	385	5 Q	481.9*	6
Munkhbayar Dorjsuren	25 m pistol	583	=5 Q	684.6	5
Susanne Kiermayer	Trap	62	=3 Q	79	5
Susanne Kiermayer	Double trap	101	=11	Did not advance	
Barbara Lechner	50 m rifle 3 positions	580	7 Q	677.6	7
Sonja Pfeilschifter	10 m air rifle	396	6 Q	498.7	6
Sonja Pfeilschifter	50 m rifle 3 positions	582	6 Q	679.6	6
Claudia Verdicchio	10 m air pistol	380	=16	Did not advance	
Claudia Verdicchio	25 m pistol	572	=23	Did not advance	

* Won in shoot-off

== Swimming ==
German swimmers earned qualifying standards in the following events (up to a maximum of 2 swimmers in each event at the A-standard time, and 1 at the B-standard time): Swimmers qualified from the German Olympic Trials.

Men

Athlete	Event	Heat		Semifinal		Final	
Athlete	Event	Time	Rank	Time	Rank	Time	Rank
Marco di Carli	100 m backstroke	55.58	11 Q	55.03	8 Q	55.27	8
Steffen Driesen	100 m backstroke	54.92	6 Q	54.64	5 Q	54.63	7
Christian Hein	400 m freestyle	3:49.66	10	—N/a		Did not advance	
Christian Hein	1500 m freestyle	15:15.42	12	—N/a		Did not advance	
Heiko Hell	400 m freestyle	3:52.06	18	—N/a		Did not advance	
Stefan Herbst	200 m freestyle	1:50.23	19	Did not advance			
Christian Keller	200 m individual medley	2:02.93	21	Did not advance			
René Kolonko	100 m breaststroke	1:02.09	16 Q	1:01.82	11	Did not advance	
Jens Kruppa	100 m breaststroke	1:01.19	8 Q	1:01.68	10	Did not advance	
Jens Kruppa	200 m breaststroke	2:15.29	18	Did not advance			
Stephan Kunzelmann	100 m freestyle	50.98	36	Did not advance			
Thomas Lurz	1500 m freestyle	15:33.81	22	—N/a		Did not advance	
Helge Meeuw	100 m butterfly	53.11	16 Q	52.99	13	Did not advance	
Helge Meeuw	200 m butterfly	1:58.96	18	Did not advance			
Thomas Rupprath	100 m butterfly	52.57	7 Q	52.71	7 Q	52.27	4
Jens Schreiber	200 m freestyle	1:49.00	8 Q	DNS		Did not advance	
Torsten Spanneberg	100 m freestyle	49.71	15 Q	49.88	16	Did not advance	
Lars Conrad; Stefan Herbst; Christian Keller*; Stephan Kunzelmann*; Jens Schreiber; Torsten Spanneberg	4 × 100 m freestyle relay	3:17.97	8 Q	—N/a		3:17.18	8
Lars Conrad; Heiko Hell; Stefan Herbst*; Christian Keller; Johannes Österling*; Jens Schreiber	4 × 200 m freestyle relay	7:16.75	3 Q	—N/a		7:16.51	6
Lars Conrad; Steffen Driesen; Jens Kruppa; Helge Meeuw*; Thomas Rupprath	4 × 100 m medley relay	3:36.65	2 Q	—N/a		3:34.72	2nd place, silver medalist(s)

* Competed only in heats and received medals

Women

Athlete	Event	Heat		Semifinal		Final	
Athlete	Event	Time	Rank	Time	Rank	Time	Rank
Vipa Bernhardt	100 m breaststroke	1:09.60	12 Q	1:09.72	13	Did not advance	
Dorothea Brandt	50 m freestyle	25.67	15 Q	25.83	16	Did not advance	
Antje Buschschulte	100 m backstroke	1:01.68	6 Q	1:00.94	3 Q	1:01.39	6
Antje Buschschulte	200 m backstroke	2:12.96	5 Q	2:10.66	4 Q	2:09.88	3rd place, bronze medalist(s)
Sara Harstick	200 m freestyle	2:02.25	20	Did not advance			
Jana Henke	800 m freestyle	8:31.06	5 Q	—N/a		8:33.95	7
Nicole Hetzer	200 m backstroke	2:14.42	13 Q	2:13.01	11	Did not advance	
Nicole Hetzer	400 m individual medley	4:41.74	5 Q	—N/a		4:40.20	6
Annika Mehlhorn	200 m butterfly	2:12.25	14 Q	2:11.37	14	Did not advance	
Janine Pietsch	100 m backstroke	1:03.13	23	Did not advance			
Sarah Poewe	100 m breaststroke	1:07.97	4 Q	1:07.48	2 Q	1:07.53	5
Anne Poleska	200 m breaststroke	2:26.48	2 Q	2:26.59	4 Q	2:25.82	3rd place, bronze medalist(s)
Teresa Rohmann	200 m individual medley	2:16.06	10 Q	2:14.47	7 Q	2:13.70	5
Teresa Rohmann	400 m individual medley	4:48.51	18	—N/a		Did not advance	
Birte Steven	200 m breaststroke	2:27.42	7 Q	2:29.22	11	Did not advance	
Hannah Stockbauer	400 m freestyle	4:10.46	12	—N/a		Did not advance	
Hannah Stockbauer	800 m freestyle	8:38.17	14	—N/a		Did not advance	
Franziska van Almsick	100 m freestyle	55.57	11 Q	DNS		Did not advance	
Franziska van Almsick	200 m freestyle	2:00.23	9 Q	1:59.13	6 Q	1:58.88	5
Franziska van Almsick	100 m butterfly	59.53	11 Q	DNS		Did not advance	
Sandra Völker	50 m freestyle	25.74	18	Did not advance			
Antje Buschschulte; Petra Dallmann; Daniela Götz; Britta Steffen*; Franziska van Almsick	4 × 100 m freestyle relay	3:41.19	4 Q	—N/a		3:37.94	4
Antje Buschschulte; Petra Dallmann; Janina Götz*; Sara Harstick*; Hannah Stockbauer; Franziska van Almsick	4 × 200 m freestyle relay	8:03.22	4 Q	—N/a		7:57.35	3rd place, bronze medalist(s)
Antje Buschschulte; Daniela Götz; Sarah Poewe; Franziska van Almsick	4 × 100 m medley relay	4:04.16	3 Q	—N/a		4:00.72	3rd place, bronze medalist(s)

* Competed only in heats and received medals

== Table tennis ==
Men

Athlete	Event	Round 1	Round 2	Round 3	Round 4	Quarterfinals	Semifinals	Final / BM	
Athlete	Event	Opposition Result	Opposition Result	Opposition Result	Opposition Result	Opposition Result	Opposition Result	Opposition Result	Rank
Timo Boll	Singles	Bye		Chila (FRA); W 4–1	Schlager (AUT); W 4–3	Waldner (SWE); L 1–4	Did not advance		
Jörg Roßkopf	Singles	Bye	Krzeszewski (POL); W 4–1	Wang H (CHN); L 1–4	Did not advance				
Torben Wosik	Singles	Guèye (SEN); W 4–0	Keen (NED); L 3–4	Did not advance					
Timo Boll; Zoltan Fejer-Konnerth	Doubles	—N/a	Bye	Arai / Yuzawa (JPN); W 4–0	Lee C-S / Ryu S-M (KOR); L 0–4	Did not advance			
Lars Hielscher; Jörg Roßkopf	Doubles	—N/a	Hanashiro / Hoyama (BRA); W 4–2	Joo S-H / Oh S-E (KOR); L 1–4	Did not advance				

Women

Athlete	Event	Round 1	Round 2	Round 3	Round 4	Quarterfinals	Semifinals	Final / BM	
Athlete	Event	Opposition Result	Opposition Result	Opposition Result	Opposition Result	Opposition Result	Opposition Result	Opposition Result	Rank
Elke Schall	Singles	Bye	Lay (AUS); W 4–2	Niu Jf (CHN); L 3–4	Did not advance				
Jie Schöpp	Singles	Bye	Stefanova (ITA); W 4–1	Umemura (JPN); L 2–4	Did not advance				
Nicole Struse	Singles	Bye	Komwong (THA); L 1–4	Did not advance					
Elke Schall; Nicole Struse	Doubles	Bye		C Li / K Li (NZL); L 1–4	Did not advance				

== Tennis ==
Athlete	Event	Round of 64	Round of 32	Round of 16	Quarterfinals	Semifinals	Final / BM	
Athlete	Event	Opposition Score	Opposition Score	Opposition Score	Opposition Score	Opposition Score	Opposition Score	Rank
Tommy Haas	Men's singles	Ančić (CRO); W 6–1, 7–5	Roddick (USA); L 6–4, 3–6, 7–9	Did not advance				
Nicolas Kiefer	Men's singles	Voltchkov (BLR); W 6–2, 6–4	Baghdatis (CYP); W 6–2, 3–6, 6–3	Youzhny (RUS); L 3–6, 6–2, 2–6	Did not advance			
Florian Mayer	Men's singles	Berdych (CZE); L 3–6, 5–7	Did not advance					
Rainer Schüttler	Men's singles	Andreev (RUS); L 7–6^{(7–5)}, 6–7^{(2–7)}, 2–6	Did not advance					
Nicolas Kiefer; Rainer Schüttler	Men's doubles	—N/a	Hănescu / Pavel (ROM); W 7–5, 7–6^{(7–3)}	Arthurs / Woodbridge (AUS); W 7–6^{(7–3)}, 6–3	Erlich / Ram (ISR); W 2–6, 6–2, 6–2	Bhupathi / Paes (IND); W 6–2, 6–3	González / Massú (CHI); L 2–6, 6–4, 6–3, 6–7^{(7–9)}, 4–6	2nd place, silver medalist(s)

== Triathlon ==
Germany's five triathletes in 2004 included three veterans, but the defending silver medallist was not among them. Each of the three improved upon their ranking from four years earlier, while the two rookie men also had solid races. Germany earned no medals in the 2004 triathlons, but did have a top eight finisher.

Athlete	Event	Swim (1.5 km)	Trans 1	Bike (40 km)	Trans 2	Run (10 km)	Total Time	Rank
Sebastian Dehmer	Men's	18:23	0:17	1:05:31	0:20	33:08	1:57:02.88	26
Maik Petzold	Men's	18:17	0:18	1:02:36	0:20	33:57	1:54:50.92	19
Andreas Raelert	Men's	18:07	0:17	1:01:40	0:18	32:48	1:52:35.62	6
Anja Dittmer	Women's	19:41	0:25	1:10:46	0:24	36:58	2:07:25.07	11
Joelle Franzmann	Women's	18:55	0:18	1:11:33	0:24	37:50	2:08:18.33	16

== Volleyball ==
=== Beach ===
Athlete	Event	Preliminary round	Standing	Round of 16	Quarterfinals	Semifinals	Final	
Athlete	Event	Opposition Score	Standing	Opposition Score	Opposition Score	Opposition Score	Opposition Score	Rank
Christoph Dieckmann; Andreas Scheuerpflug	Men's	Pool B Álvarez – Rossell (CUB); W 2 – 0 (21–19, 19–21, 15–10); Canet – Hamel (FRA); L 1 – 2 (21–17, 18–21, 10–15); Araújo – Insfran (BRA); W 2 – 0 (22–20, 21–17)	1 Q	Schacht – Slack (AUS); W 2 – 0 (21–19, 21–12)	Prosser – Williams (AUS); L 1 – 2 (21–16, 19–21, 10–15)	Did not advance		
Markus Dieckmann; Jonas Reckermann	Men's	Pool D Hernández – Papaleo (PUR); W 2 – 0 (21–14, 21–13); Berg – Dahl (SWE); W 2 – 0 (21–16, 21–15); Høidalen – Kjemperud (NOR); L 1 – 2 (24–22, 24–26, 13–15)	1 Q	Holdren – Metzger (USA); L 1 – 2 (16–21, 21–19, 13–15)	Did not advance			
Susanne Lahme; Danja Müsch	Women's	Pool C Arvaniti – Koutroumanidou (GRE); W 2 – 1 (21–16, 16–21, 15–10); Håkedal – Tørlen (NOR); L 1 – 2 (21–13, 17–21, 12–15); Connelly – Pires (BRA); W 2 – 1 (18–21, 21–15, 15–11)	1 Q	Gattelli – Perrotta (ITA); L 1 – 2 (21–16, 17–21, 19–21)	Did not advance			
Stephanie Pohl; Okka Rau	Women's	Pool E Wang L/You Mh (CHN); W 2 – 0 (21–17, 21–18); P Yanchulova – T Yanchulova (BUL); L 1 – 2 (21–18, 19–21, 13–15); Cook – Sanderson (AUS); W 2 – 0 (21–10, 22–20)	1 Q	Arvaniti – Koutroumanidou (GRE); W 2 – 1 (21–12, 19–21, 15–11)	McPeak – Youngs (USA); L 0 – 2 (17–21, 17–21)	Did not advance		

=== Indoor ===
==== Women's tournament ====
Roster

The following is the German roster in the women's volleyball tournament of the 2004 Summer Olympics.

Head coach: (South Korea) Lee Hee-wan

No.	Name	Date of birth	Height	Weight	Spike	Block	2004 club
3	Tanja Hart	24 January 1974	1.76 m (5 ft 9 in)	70 kg (150 lb)	291 cm (115 in)	275 cm (108 in)	(Germany) SSV Ulm 1846
4	Kerstin Tzscherlich (L)	15 February 1978	1.79 m (5 ft 10 in)	75 kg (165 lb)	295 cm (116 in)	282 cm (111 in)	(Germany) Dresdner SC
6	Julia Schlecht	16 March 1980	1.82 m (6 ft 0 in)	67 kg (148 lb)	298 cm (117 in)	277 cm (109 in)	(Germany) TSV Bayer 04 Leverkusen
8	Cornelia Dumler	22 January 1982	1.81 m (5 ft 11 in)	69 kg (152 lb)	309 cm (122 in)	285 cm (112 in)	(Germany) TSV Bayer 04 Leverkusen
9	Christina Benecke	14 October 1974	1.90 m (6 ft 3 in)	80 kg (180 lb)	314 cm (124 in)	291 cm (115 in)	(Germany) TV Fischbek
11	Christiane Fürst	29 March 1985	1.92 m (6 ft 4 in)	74 kg (163 lb)	305 cm (120 in)	291 cm (115 in)	(Germany) Dresdner SC
12	Olessya Kulakova	31 January 1977	1.90 m (6 ft 3 in)	70 kg (150 lb)	315 cm (124 in)	298 cm (117 in)	(Germany) Schweriner SC
13	Atika Bouagaa	22 May 1982	1.84 m (6 ft 0 in)	69 kg (152 lb)	306 cm (120 in)	289 cm (114 in)	(Italy) Volley Modena
14	Kathy Radzuweit	2 March 1982	1.96 m (6 ft 5 in)	72 kg (159 lb)	319 cm (126 in)	300 cm (120 in)	(Germany) TSV Bayer 04 Leverkusen
15	Angelina Grün (c)	2 December 1979	1.85 m (6 ft 1 in)	67 kg (148 lb)	309 cm (122 in)	287 cm (113 in)	(Italy) Foppapedretti Bergamo
16	Judith Sylvester	13 October 1977	1.93 m (6 ft 4 in)	85 kg (187 lb)	312 cm (123 in)	296 cm (117 in)	(Italy) Properzi Volley Lodi
17	Birgit Thumm	3 July 1980	1.84 m (6 ft 0 in)	70 kg (150 lb)	310 cm (120 in)	289 cm (114 in)	(Germany) Rote Raben Vilsbiburg

Group play

Pos	Team	Pld	W	L	Pts	SW	SL	SR	SPW	SPL	SPR	Qualification
1	China	5	4	1	9	14	4	3.500	429	346	1.240	Quarterfinals
2	Russia	5	3	2	8	11	8	1.375	426	388	1.098	Quarterfinals
3	Cuba	5	3	2	8	11	10	1.100	443	460	0.963	Quarterfinals
4	United States	5	2	3	7	11	10	1.100	472	467	1.011	Quarterfinals
5	Germany	5	2	3	7	7	11	0.636	387	414	0.935	
6	Dominican Republic	5	1	4	6	3	14	0.214	334	416	0.803	

Source: FIVB

14 August 2004; 09:00	Cuba	2–3	Germany	Peace and Friendship Stadium; Referees: Hiroyuki Ito (JPN), Abdullah Al Khelaifi (KSA)
14 August 2004; 09:00	(25–20, 26–24, 22–25, 15–25, 15–17) result			Peace and Friendship Stadium; Referees: Hiroyuki Ito (JPN), Abdullah Al Khelaifi (KSA)

16 August 2004; 19:30	United States	3–1	Germany	Peace and Friendship Stadium; Referees: Hiroyuki Ito (JPN), Ibrahim Al Naama (QAT))
16 August 2004; 19:30	(25–22, 25–22, 22–25, 27–25) result			Peace and Friendship Stadium; Referees: Hiroyuki Ito (JPN), Ibrahim Al Naama (QAT))

18 August 2004; 19:30	Germany	0–3	Russia	Peace and Friendship Stadium; Referees: Bela Hobor (HUN), Georgios Karampetsos (GRE)
18 August 2004; 19:30	(29–31, 11–25, 18–25) result			Peace and Friendship Stadium; Referees: Bela Hobor (HUN), Georgios Karampetsos (GRE)

20 August 2004; 09:00	China	3–0	Germany	Peace and Friendship Stadium; Referees: Valdir Dellaqua (BRA), Mahmoud Abdel Magid (EGY)
20 August 2004; 09:00	(25–18, 25–15, 25–16) result			Peace and Friendship Stadium; Referees: Valdir Dellaqua (BRA), Mahmoud Abdel Magid (EGY)

22 August 2004; 9:00	Germany	3–0	Dominican Republic	Peace and Friendship Stadium; Referees: Valdir Dellaqua (BRA), Mahmoud Abdel Magid (EGY)
22 August 2004; 9:00	(25–16, 25–19, 25–21) result			Peace and Friendship Stadium; Referees: Valdir Dellaqua (BRA), Mahmoud Abdel Magid (EGY)

== Water polo ==
=== Men's tournament ===
Roster

The following is the German roster in the men's water polo tournament of the 2004 Summer Olympics.

Head coach: Hagen Stamm

№	Name	Pos.	Height	Weight	Date of birth	2004 club
1	Alexander Tchigir	GK	1.91 m (6 ft 3 in)	81 kg (179 lb)	6 November 1968	(Germany) Wasserfreunde Spandau 04
2	Michael Zellmer	GK	1.90 m (6 ft 3 in)	93 kg (205 lb)	14 August 1977	(Germany) Waspo Hannover
3	Fabian Schrödter	CB	2.04 m (6 ft 8 in)	98 kg (216 lb)	11 September 1982	(Germany) Wasserfreunde Spandau 04
4	Patrick Weissinger (C)	CB	1.94 m (6 ft 4 in)	90 kg (200 lb)	2 April 1973	(Germany) Wasserfreunde Spandau 04
5	Steffen Dierolf	D	1.93 m (6 ft 4 in)	92 kg (203 lb)	5 May 1976	(Germany) SV Cannstatt
6	Marc Torsten Politze	CF	1.96 m (6 ft 5 in)	99 kg (218 lb)	20 October 1977	(Germany) Wasserfreunde Spandau 04
7	Tim Wollthan	CB	1.93 m (6 ft 4 in)	97 kg (214 lb)	29 April 1980	(Germany) SV Bayer Uerdingen 08
8	Thomas Schertwitis	CF	1.98 m (6 ft 6 in)	119 kg (262 lb)	2 September 1972	(Germany) Wasserfreunde Spandau 04
9	Tobias Kreuzmann	D	1.95 m (6 ft 5 in)	90 kg (200 lb)	15 June 1981	(Germany) ASC Duisburg
10	Heiko Nossek	D	1.86 m (6 ft 1 in)	96 kg (212 lb)	14 March 1982	(Germany) SV Cannstatt
11	Lukasz Kieloch	D	1.93 m (6 ft 4 in)	98 kg (216 lb)	15 March 1976	(Germany) SV Cannstatt
12	Sören Mackeben	D	1.93 m (6 ft 4 in)	85 kg (187 lb)	29 January 1979	(Germany) Wasserfreunde Spandau 04
13	Jens Pohlmann	D	1.80 m (5 ft 11 in)	82 kg (181 lb)	30 October 1978	(Germany) Wasserfreunde Spandau 04

Group play

Pos	Team	Pld	W	D	L	GF	GA	GD	Pts	Qualification
1	Greece	5	4	0	1	43	27	+16	8	Qualified for the semifinals
2	Germany	5	3	1	1	40	28	+12	7	Qualified for the quarterfinals
3	Spain	5	3	0	2	35	31	+4	6	Qualified for the quarterfinals
4	Italy	5	3	0	2	39	24	+15	6	
5	Australia	5	1	1	3	37	35	+2	4	
6	Egypt	5	0	0	5	18	67	−49	0	

15 August 2004; 21:00	Germany	5–4	Greece	Athens Olympic Aquatic Centre; Referees: Brguljan (SCG), Afanasiev (RUS)
15 August 2004; 21:00	Score by quarters: 2-2, 0-1, 2-1, 1-0			Athens Olympic Aquatic Centre; Referees: Brguljan (SCG), Afanasiev (RUS)
15 August 2004; 21:00	5 players with 1	Goals	4 players with 1	Athens Olympic Aquatic Centre; Referees: Brguljan (SCG), Afanasiev (RUS)

17 August 2004; 10:45	Germany	13–3	Egypt	Athens Olympic Aquatic Centre; Referees: Rezek (CZE), Pinker (RSA)
17 August 2004; 10:45	Score by quarters: 4-0, 5-0, 2-0, 2-3			Athens Olympic Aquatic Centre; Referees: Rezek (CZE), Pinker (RSA)
17 August 2004; 10:45	Politze 5	Goals	3 players with 1	Athens Olympic Aquatic Centre; Referees: Rezek (CZE), Pinker (RSA)

19 August 2004; 17:45	Italy	10–5	Germany	Athens Olympic Aquatic Centre; Referees: Brguljan (SCG), Afanasiev (RUS)
19 August 2004; 17:45	Score by quarters: 2-0, 1-2, 3-2, 4-1			Athens Olympic Aquatic Centre; Referees: Brguljan (SCG), Afanasiev (RUS)
19 August 2004; 17:45	Postiglione 4	Goals	Nossek 3	Athens Olympic Aquatic Centre; Referees: Brguljan (SCG), Afanasiev (RUS)

21 August 2004; 16:30	Germany	11–5	Spain	Athens Olympic Aquatic Centre; Referees: Tulga (TUR), Brguljan (SCG)
21 August 2004; 16:30	Score by quarters: 3-2, 2-0, 4-3, 2-0			Athens Olympic Aquatic Centre; Referees: Tulga (TUR), Brguljan (SCG)
21 August 2004; 16:30	Wollthan 3	Goals	5 players with 1	Athens Olympic Aquatic Centre; Referees: Tulga (TUR), Brguljan (SCG)

23 August 2004; 09:30	Germany	6–6	Australia	Athens Olympic Aquatic Centre; Referees: Kratochvil (SVK), Brguljan (SCG)
23 August 2004; 09:30	Score by quarters: 1-3, 2-1, 1-0, 2-2			Athens Olympic Aquatic Centre; Referees: Kratochvil (SVK), Brguljan (SCG)
23 August 2004; 09:30	Politze, Nossek 2	Goals	Woods 3	Athens Olympic Aquatic Centre; Referees: Kratochvil (SVK), Brguljan (SCG)

Quarterfinal

25 August 2004; 17:00	Russia	12–5	Germany	Athens Olympic Aquatic Centre; Referees: Petronilli (ITA), Bookelman (NED)
25 August 2004; 17:00	Score by quarters: 2-1, 2-1, 5-0, 3-3			Athens Olympic Aquatic Centre; Referees: Petronilli (ITA), Bookelman (NED)
25 August 2004; 17:00	3 players with 3	Goals	5 players with 1	Athens Olympic Aquatic Centre; Referees: Petronilli (ITA), Bookelman (NED)

5th-6th Classification

29 August 2004; 12:00	Germany	6–4	Spain	Athens Olympic Aquatic Centre; Referees: Stavropoulos (GRE), Bookelman (NED)
29 August 2004; 12:00	Score by quarters: 2-2, 3-1, 0-0, 1-1			Athens Olympic Aquatic Centre; Referees: Stavropoulos (GRE), Bookelman (NED)
29 August 2004; 12:00	Nossek 2	Goals	Hernández 2	Athens Olympic Aquatic Centre; Referees: Stavropoulos (GRE), Bookelman (NED)

== Weightlifting ==
Athlete	Event	Snatch		Clean & Jerk		Total	Rank
Athlete	Event	Result	Rank	Result	Rank	Total	Rank
Rene Hoch	Men's −77 kg	142.5	=21	170	20	312.5	20
Ingo Steinhöfel	Men's −77 kg	150	17	185	14	335	14
Andre Rohde	Men's −105 kg	177.5	=14	217.5	9	395	10
Ronny Weller	Men's +105 kg	195	=6	—	—	195	DNF

== Wrestling ==
Key:

- VT - Victory by Fall.
- PP - Decision by Points - the loser with technical points.
- PO - Decision by Points - the loser without technical points.

Men's freestyle

Athlete	Event	Elimination Pool			Quarterfinal	Semifinal	Final / BM	
Athlete	Event	Opposition Result	Opposition Result	Rank	Opposition Result	Opposition Result	Opposition Result	Rank
Davyd Bichinashvili	−84 kg	Cobb (GUM); W 4–0 ^{ST}	Romero (CUB); L 0–3 ^{PO}	2	Did not advance			11
Sven Thiele	−120 kg	Chintoan (ROM); W 3–0 ^{PO}	Polatçı (TUR); L 1–3 ^{PP}	2	Did not advance			9

Men's Greco-Roman

Athlete	Event	Elimination Pool				Quarterfinal	Semifinal	Final / BM	
Athlete	Event	Opposition Result	Opposition Result	Opposition Result	Rank	Opposition Result	Opposition Result	Opposition Result	Rank
Jurij Kohl	−60 kg	Ai (CHN); L 0–3 ^{PO}	Shevtsov (RUS); L 0–3 ^{PO}	—N/a	3	Did not advance			19
Jannis Zamanduridis	−66 kg	Manukyan (KAZ); L 1–3 ^{PP}	Wood (USA); W 3–1 ^{PP}	Arkoudeas (GRE); L 1–3 ^{PP}	3	Did not advance			7
Konstantin Schneider	−74 kg	Babulfath (SWE); W 3–0 ^{PO}	Shatskykh (UKR); W 5–0 ^{VT}	Samurgashev (RUS); L 1–3 ^{PP}	2	Did not advance			7
Mirko Englich	−96 kg	Nozadze (GEO); L 1–3 ^{PP}	Saldadze (UKR); W 3–1 ^{PP}	—N/a	2	Did not advance			11

Women's freestyle

Athlete	Event	Elimination Pool			Classification	Semifinal	Final / BM	
Athlete	Event	Opposition Result	Opposition Result	Rank	Opposition Result	Opposition Result	Opposition Result	Rank
Brigitte Wagner	−48 kg	C Icho (JPN); L 0–5 ^{VT}	Belisle (CAN); W 3–1 ^{PP}	2	Enkhjargal (MGL); W 5–0 ^{VT}	Bye	Oorzhak (RUS); L 1–3 ^{PP}	6
Stéphanie Groß	−63 kg	Zygouri (GRE); L 1–3 ^{PP}	Eriksson (SWE); W 3–0 ^{PO}	2	Yanik (CAN); L 1–3 ^{PP}	Did not advance		7
Anita Schätzle	−72 kg	Gastl (AUT); W 3–1 ^{PP}	Manyurova (RUS); L 0–5 ^{VT}	2	Vryoni (GRE); W 5–0 ^{VT}	Bye	Nordhagen (CAN); L 0–5 ^{VB}	6

== See also ==
- Germany at the 2004 Summer Paralympics
