= Field hockey at the 2004 Summer Olympics =

Field hockey at the Games of the XXVIII Olympiad
- Venue: Hellinikon Olympic Hockey Centre
- Dates: 14–27 August 2004

Field hockey at the 2004 Summer Olympics was held at the Olympic Hockey Centre located within the Helliniko Olympic Complex. The competitions for both men and women was split into two groups with the top two teams after the preliminary rounds progressing through to the semi-finals.

== Men's tournament ==
=== Preliminary round ===
==== Pool A ====
Pos	Team	Pld	W	D	L	GF	GA	GD	Pts	Qualification
1	Spain	5	3	2	0	14	3	+11	11	Semi-finals
2	Germany	5	3	2	0	15	6	+9	11	Semi-finals
3	Pakistan	5	3	0	2	19	8	+11	9	5–8th place semi-finals
4	South Korea	5	2	2	1	17	8	+9	8	5–8th place semi-finals
5	Great Britain	5	1	0	4	9	21	−12	3	9–12th place semi-finals
6	Egypt	5	0	0	5	2	30	−28	0	9–12th place semi-finals

Source: FIH

==== Pool B ====
Pos	Team	Pld	W	D	L	GF	GA	GD	Pts	Qualification
1	Netherlands	5	5	0	0	16	9	+7	15	Semi-finals
2	Australia	5	3	1	1	14	10	+4	10	Semi-finals
3	New Zealand	5	3	0	2	13	11	+2	9	5–8th place semi-finals
4	India	5	1	1	3	11	13	−2	4	5–8th place semi-finals
5	South Africa	5	1	0	4	9	15	−6	3	9–12th place semi-finals
6	Argentina	5	0	2	3	8	13	−5	2	9–12th place semi-finals

Source: FIH

=== Medal round ===
Semi-finals
25 August
Netherlands	3
Germany	2
25 August
Spain	3
Australia	6

Gold medal match
27 August
Netherlands	1
Australia (a.e.t.)	2
Bronze medal match
27 August
Germany (a.e.t.)	4
Spain	3

=== Final standings ===
1. Australia
2. Netherlands
3. Germany
4. Spain
5. Pakistan
6. New Zealand
7. India
8. South Korea
9. Great Britain
10. South Africa
11. Argentina
12. Egypt

== Women's tournament ==
=== Preliminary round ===
==== Pool A ====
Pos	Team	Pld	W	D	L	GF	GA	GD	Pts	Qualification
1	China	4	4	0	0	11	2	+9	12	Semi-finals
2	Argentina	4	3	0	1	12	4	+8	9	Semi-finals
3	Japan	4	2	0	2	5	7	−2	6	
4	New Zealand	4	1	0	3	3	9	−6	3	
5	Spain	4	0	0	4	3	12	−9	0	

Source: FIH
Rules for classification: 1) Points; 2) Matches won; 3) Goal difference; 4) Goals for; 5) Head-to-head result.

==== Pool B ====
Pos	Team	Pld	W	D	L	GF	GA	GD	Pts	Qualification
1	Netherlands	4	4	0	0	14	5	+9	12	Semi-finals
2	Germany	4	2	0	2	6	10	−4	6	Semi-finals
3	South Korea	4	1	1	2	9	8	+1	4	
4	Australia	4	1	1	2	6	5	+1	4	
5	South Africa	4	1	0	3	5	12	−7	3	

Source: FIH
Rules for classification: 1) Points; 2) Matches won; 3) Goal difference; 4) Goals for; 5) Head-to-head result.

=== Medal round ===
Semi-finals
24 August
Netherlands (pen.)	2 (4)
Argentina	2 (2)
24 August
China	0 (3)
Germany (pen.)	0 (4)

Gold medal match
26 August
Netherlands	1
Germany	2
Bronze medal match
26 August
Argentina	1
China	0

=== Final standings ===
1. Germany
2. Netherlands
3. Argentina
4. China
5. Australia
6. New Zealand
7. South Korea
8. Japan
9. South Africa
10. Spain

== Medal summary ==
=== Medal table ===
Rank	Nation	Gold	Silver	Bronze	Total
1	Germany	1	0	1	2
2	Australia	1	0	0	1
3	Netherlands	0	2	0	2
4	Argentina	0	0	1	1
Totals (4 entries)		2	2	2	6

=== Medalists ===
Event	Gold	Silver	Bronze
Men	Australia; Michael Brennan; Travis Brooks; Dean Butler; Liam de Young; Jamie Dwyer; Nathan Eglington; Troy Elder; Bevan George; Robert Hammond; Mark Hickman; Mark Knowles; Brent Livermore; Michael McCann; Stephen Mowlam; Grant Schubert; Matthew Wells	Netherlands; Matthijs Brouwer; Ronald Brouwer; Jeroen Delmee; Teun de Nooijer; Geert-Jan Derikx; Rob Derikx; Marten Eikelboom; Floris Evers; Erik Jazet; Karel Klaver; Jesse Mahieu; Rob Reckers; Taeke Taekema; Sander van der Weide; Klaas Veering; Guus Vogels	Germany; Clemens Arnold; Christoph Bechmann; Sebastian Biederlack; Philipp Crone; Eike Duckwitz; Christoph Eimer; Björn Emmerling; Florian Kunz; Björn Michel; Sascha Reinelt; Justus Scharowsky; Christian Schulte; Timo Weß; Tibor Weißenborn; Matthias Witthaus; Christopher Zeller
Women	Germany; Tina Bachmann; Caroline Casaretto; Nadine Ernsting-Krienke; Franziska Gude; Mandy Haase; Natascha Keller; Denise Klecker; Anke Kühn; Badri Latif; Heike Lätzsch; Sonja Lehmann; Silke Müller; Fanny Rinne; Marion Rodewald; Louisa Walter; Julia Zwehl	Netherlands; Minke Booij; Ageeth Boomgaardt; Chantal de Bruijn; Lisanne de Roever; Mijntje Donners; Sylvia Karres; Fatima Moreira de Melo; Eefke Mulder; Maartje Scheepstra; Janneke Schopman; Clarinda Sinnige; Minke Smabers; Jiske Snoeks; Macha van der Vaart; Miek van Geenhuizen; Lieve van Kessel	Argentina; Paola Vukojicic; Cecilia Rognoni; Mariné Russo; Ayelén Stepnik; María de la Paz Hernández; Mercedes Margalot; Vanina Oneto; Soledad García; Mariana González; Alejandra Gulla; Luciana Aymar; Claudia Burkart; Marina di Giacomo; Magdalena Aicega; Mariela Antoniska; Inés Arrondo
