= 1939 Tschammerpokal =

Tournament details
- Country: Germany
- Teams: 62

Final positions
- Champions: 1. FC Nürnberg
- Runners-up: Waldhof Mannheim

Tournament statistics
- Matches played: 64

The 1939 Tschammerpokal was the 5th season of the annual German football cup competition. In the final which was held on 28 April 1940 in the Olympiastadion 1. FC Nürnberg defeated Waldhof Mannheim 2–0, thereby becoming the first club to win the cup twice.

== Matches ==
=== First round ===
20 August 1939
SC Union Oberschöneweide	1 – 2	Blau-Weiß 90 Berlin
PSV Danzig	2 – 3	Viktoria Stolp
NSTG Warnsdorf	2 – 3	FC Sportfreunde Leipzig
1. SC Göttingen 05	4 – 3	1. SV Jena
WKG BSG Neumeyer Nürnberg	7 – 3	CSC 03 Kassel
VfL Halle 1896	0 – 3	Dresdner SC
FC Thüringen Weida	1 – 2	Berliner SV 92
SV Klettendorf	3 – 0	Minerva 93 Berlin
VfL Köln 1899	9 – 0	Wormatia Worms
Eimsbütteler TV	2 – 3	Borussia Dortmund
1. FC Schweinfurt 05	2 – 3	SC Wacker Wien	(AET)	(AET)
Hamborn 07	1 – 3	Hamburger SV
Blumenthaler SV	3 – 4	SV Polizei Hamburg	(AET)
VfR Mannheim	2 – 3	Westende Hamborn	(AET)
SV Kurhessen Kassel	0 – 5	SpVgg Köln-Sülz
First Vienna FC 1894	2 – 3	BC Hartha	(AET)
Borussia Neunkirchen	4 – 1	VfL Benrath
FC Singen 04	1 – 3	1. FC Nürnberg
SpVgg 1899 Leipzig	1 – 2	Vorwärts-Rasensport Gleiwitz
Hertha BSC	6 – 2	Planitzer SC
Vorwärts Billstedt	1 – 3	Fortuna Düsseldorf
FSV Frankfurt	5 – 3	Mülheimer SV 06
SV Dessau 05	1 – 2	Tennis Borussia Berlin
Konkordia Plauen	5 – 3	SC Victoria Hamburg
SK Admira Wien	0 – 1	SV Waldhof Mannheim
SV Beuel 06	0 – 5	Eintracht Frankfurt
VfB 03 Bielefeld	1 – 3	VfL Osnabrück
VfvB Alsum	0 – 13	FC Schalke 04
VfB Coburg	1 – 6	SK Rapid Wien
Sportvgg. Masovia Lyck	cancelled	MSV Tilsit
5 November 1939
SpVgg Cannstatt	1 – 1	VfB Mühlburg
Phönix Karlsruhe	3 – 5	Stuttgarter Kickers

==== Replay ====
12 November 1939
VfB Mühlburg	2 – 0	SpVgg Cannstatt

=== Second round ===
19 November 1939
Viktoria Stolp	1 – 3	Blau-Weiß 90 Berlin
FC Sportfreunde Leipzig	3 – 1	1. SC Göttingen 05
Dresdner SC	1 – 2	WKG BSG Neumeyer Nürnberg
Berliner SV 92	6 – 1	SV Klettendorf
Borussia Dortmund	1 – 6	VfL 99 Köln
SC Wacker Wien	4 – 2	VfB Mühlburg
Hamburger SV	11 – 2	SV Polizei Hamburg
Borussia Neunkirchen	1 – 2	BC Hartha	(AET)
1. FC Nürnberg	2 – 1	Stuttgarter Kickers
Vorwärts-Rasensport Gleiwitz	5 – 2	Hertha BSC
Tennis Borussia Berlin	4 – 1	Konkordia Plauen
Eintracht Frankfurt	0 – 1	SV Waldhof Mannheim	(AET)
VfL Osnabrück	3 – 2	FC Schalke 04
3 December 1939
Fortuna Düsseldorf	4 – 0	FSV Frankfurt
SpVgg Köln-Sülz	1 – 2	Westende Hamborn	(AET)
SK Rapid Wien		bye

=== Round of 16 ===
10 December 1939
Blau-Weiß 90 Berlin	9 – 2	FC Sportfreunde Leipzig
BC Hartha	0 – 1	1. FC Nürnberg
Neumeyer Nürnberg	2 – 1	Berliner SV 92
SK Rapid Wien	6 – 1	Vorwärts-Rasensport Gleiwitz
VfL Köln	1 – 3	SC Wacker Wien
Fortuna Düsseldorf	8 – 1	Tennis Borussia Berlin
Hamburger SV	2 – 0	Westende Hamborn
SV Waldhof Mannheim	4 – 0	VfL Osnabrück

=== Quarter-finals ===
7 January 1940
Blau-Weiß 90 Berlin	1 – 7	SK Rapid Wien
1. FC Nürnberg	3 – 1	Fortuna Düsseldorf
SV Waldhof Mannheim	6 – 2	Hamburger SV
SC Wacker Wien	7 – 4	Neumeyer Nürnberg

=== Semi-finals ===
31 March 1940
SK Rapid Wien	0 – 1	1. FC Nürnberg
SV Waldhof Mannheim	1 – 1	SC Wacker Wien	(AET)

==== Replays ====
SV Waldhof Mannheim	2 – 2	SC Wacker Wien	(AET)
SV Waldhof Mannheim	0 – 0^{*}	SC Wacker Wien	(AET)

^{*} After the second replay a drawing decided that Mannheim would advance to the final.

=== Final ===
28 April 1940

1. FC Nürnberg	2–0	Waldhof Mannheim
Eiberger 46', 85'	Report

Olympiastadion, Berlin
Attendance: 60,000
Referee: Carl Schütz (Düsseldorf)
