= Froger =

Froger is a surname. Notable people with the surname include:

- René Froger (born 1960), Dutch singer
- Thierry Froger (born 1963), French footballer and coach
- Maarten Froger (born 1977), Dutch field-hockey player
- Martine Froger (born 1961), French politician

== See also ==
- Roger
