= 2002 Men's Hockey Champions Trophy =

Tournament details
- Host country: Germany
- City: Cologne
- Dates: 31 August – 8 September
- Teams: 6
- Venue: Kölner Stadtwald

Final positions
- Champions: Netherlands (6th title)
- Runner-up: Germany
- Third place: Pakistan

Tournament statistics
- Matches played: 18
- Goals scored: 86 (4.78 per match)
- Top scorer: (Netherlands) Taeke Taekema (7 goals)
- Best player: (India) Dhanraj Pillay
- Best goalkeeper: (Germany) Clemens Arnold

The 2002 Men's Hockey Champions Trophy was the 24th edition of the Hockey Champions Trophy men's field hockey tournament. It took place at the Kölner Stadtwald in Cologne, Germany. The event was held from August 31 – September 8, 2002.

Netherlands won the tournament by defeating Germany in the final.

== Squads ==
Australia

Head Coach: Barry Dancer

1. Jamie Dwyer
2. Liam de Young
3. Adam Commens
4. Michael McCann
6. Robert Hammond
7. Nathan Eglington
10. Paul Gaudoin (C)
11. Ben Taylor
13. Leon Martin (GK)
15. Bevan George
16. Josh Hawes
17. Andrew Smith
19. Mark Hickman (GK)
20. Scott Webster
22. Ben Bishop
23. Matthew Wells
26. Dean Butler
27. Zain Wright
Germany

Head Coach: Bernhard Peters

1. Clemens Arnold (GK)
2. Christian Schulte (GK)
4. Philipp Crone
5. Max Landshut
6. Christian Wein
7. Björn Michel
8. Sascha Reinelt
9. Oliver Domke
11. Björn Emmerling
12. Sebastian Biederlack
14. Tibor Weißenborn
15. Florian Kunz (C)
16. Eike Duckwitz
17. Timo Weß
18. Christoph Bechmann
21. Justus Scharowsky
22. Matthias Witthaus
23. Philipp Zeller
India

Head Coach: Rajinder Singh

1. Devesh Chauhan (GK)
2. Dilip Tirkey (C)
3. Kanwaljit Singh
4. Sukhbir Singh Gill
5. Bimal Lakra
6. Ignace Tirkey
7. Jugraj Singh
8. Arjun Halappa
9. Dhanraj Pillay
10. Tejbir Singh
11. Gagan Ajit Singh
12. Viren Rasquinha
15. Daljit Singh Dhillon
16. Bharat Chettri (GK)
17. Dinesh Nayak
20. Deepak Thakur
22. Prabhjot Singh
27. Vikram Pillay
Netherlands

Head Coach: Joost Bellaart

1. Guus Vogels (GK)
2. Bram Lomans
3. Geert-Jan Derikx
4. Erik Jazet
6. Floris Evers
7. Sander van der Weide
8. Ronald Brouwer
9. Piet-Hein Geeris
11. Maarten Froger
12. Jeroen Delmee (C)
13. Josef Kramer (GK)
14. Teun de Nooijer
16. Jan Jörn van 't Land
18. Rob Reckers
19. Matthijs Brouwer
23. Rob Derikx
24. Taeke Taekema
25. Menno Booij
Pakistan

Head Coach: Tahir Zaman

1. Muhammad Qasim (GK)
2. Sohail Abbas
3. Tariq Imran
4. Muhammad Usman
5. Muhammad Saqlain
6. Waseem Ahmed
7. Mohammad Nadeem
8. Muhammad Sarwar
9. Kashif Jawad
10. Khalid Saleem
11. Muhammad Shabbir
12. Ahmed Alam (GK)
13. Zeeshan Ashraf
14. Ghazanfar Ali
15. Dilawar Hussain
16. Mudassar Ali Khan
17. Kamran Ashraf
18. Rehan Butt
South Korea

Head Coach: Kim Young-Kyu

1. Kang Keon-wook (C)
2. Shin Seok-kyo
3. Lim Jung-chun (GK)
4. Kang Seong-jung
5. Kim Yong-bae
7. Yeo Woon-kon
8. Kim Jung-chul
9. Song Seung-tae
10. Seo Jong-ho
13. Lee Nam-yong
15. Kim Kyung-seok
16. Kim Yoon (GK)
17. Kim Sam-seok
19. Hwang Jong-hyun
21. Kim Chul
22. Ji Seong-hwan
23. Jeon Jong-ha
25. You Hyo-sik

== Results ==
All times are Central European Summer Time (UTC+02:00)

=== Preliminary round ===
==== Pool ====
Team	Pld	W	D	L	GF	GA	GD	Pts
Netherlands	5	4	1	0	21	9	+12	13
Germany	5	4	0	1	13	12	+1	12
India	5	2	1	2	13	14	−1	7
Pakistan	5	2	0	3	11	10	+1	6
South Korea	5	2	0	3	11	14	−3	6
Australia	5	0	0	5	7	17	−10	0

Source: FIH

31 August 2002
12:15

Germany	3–2	Pakistan
Domke 19'; Kunz 66'; Emmerling 68'	Report	Jawad 21'; Sarwar 51'

Umpires:
Philip Schellekens (NED)
Ray O'Connor (IRL)

31 August 2002
14:15

India	3–3	Netherlands
J. Singh 22'; Pillay 59'; P. Singh 67'	Report	Taekema 11'; M. Brouwer 35', 70'

Umpires:
David Gentles (AUS)
Han Jin-soo (KOR)

31 August 2002
16:15

Australia	2–3	South Korea
Eglington 19'; McCann 65'	Report	Yeo Woon-kon 33', 56'; Hwang Jong-hyun 59'

Umpires:
Markus Meyer (GER)
Satinder Kumar (IND)

1 September 2002
12:15

India	2–3	Germany
G. Singh 37'; J. Singh 63'	Report	Weß 19'; Wein 58'; Kunz 67'

Umpires:
Gregory Maya-Perez (FRA)
Han Jin-soo (KOR)

1 September 2002
14:30

South Korea	1–4	Pakistan
Shin Seok-kyo 66'	Report	Ali Khan 18'; Jawad 20'; Abbas 43'; Sarwar 51'

Umpires:
David Leiper (SCO)
Philip Schellekens (NED)

1 September 2002
17:00

Netherlands	6–1	Australia
Lomans 18'; M. Brouwer 23'; R. Brouwer 36', 45', 58'; Taekema 42'	Report	Smith 52'

Umpires:
Christian Bläsch (GER)
Ray O'Connor (IRL)

3 September 2002
15:15

Australia	2–3	India
Webster 19'; Butler 63'	Report	J. Singh 13'; Thakur 17'; G. Singh 50'

Umpires:
Christian Bläsch (GER)
David Leiper (SCO)

3 September 2002
17:45

Pakistan	1–3	Netherlands
Nadeem 70'	Report	Taekema 33', 34'; De Nooijer 42'

Umpires:
David Gentles (AUS)
Markus Meyer (GER)

4 September 2002
15:15

Germany	2–1	South Korea
Michel 3'; Weß 51'	Report	Jeon Jong-ha 18'

Umpires:
Gregory Maya-Perez (FRA)
Satinder Kumar (IND)

4 September 2002
17:45

India	3–2	Pakistan
P. Singh 20'; Tirkey 34'; G. Singh 52'	Report	Ali 22'; Abbas 54'

Umpires:
Ray O'Connor (IRL)
David Leiper (SCO)

5 September 2002
15:15

Australia	2–3	Germany
Dwyer 27'; Smith 57'	Report	Reinelt 11'; Domke 67'; Witthaus 70'

Umpires:
Philip Schellekens (NED)
Gregory Maya-Perez (FRA)

5 September 2002
17:15

South Korea	2–4	Netherlands
Kang Keon-wook 15'; Yeo Woon-kon 53'	Report	Taekema 2', 49'; Lomans 7', 55'

Umpires:
Christian Bläsch (GER)
Satinder Kumar (IND)

6 September 2002
13:15

Pakistan	2–0	Australia
Abbas 22'; Ali Khan 57'	Report

Umpires:
Christian Bläsch (GER)
Markus Mayer (GER)

6 September 2002
15:15

Netherlands	5–2	Germany
Geeris 13'; Lomans 42'; Taekema 47'; Froger 65'; R. Brouwer 66'	Report	Emmerling 32'; Kunz 40'

Umpires:
David Gentles (AUS)
Ray O'Connor (IRL)

6 September 2002
17:45

South Korea	4–2	India
Shin Seok-kyo 23'; Jeon Jong-ha 25'; Hwang Jong-hyun 50'; Kim Kyung-seok 67'	Report	Pillay 40'; G. Singh 69'

Umpires:
Philip Schellekens (NED)
Gregory Maya-Perez (FRA)

=== Classification ===
==== Fifth and sixth place ====
8 September 2002
09:30

South Korea	0–3	Australia
	Report	Webster 15'; Dwyer 19'; McCann 52'

Umpires:
Christian Bläsch (GER)
Satinder Kumar (IND)

==== Third and fourth place ====
8 September 2002
12:00

India	3–4	Pakistan
J. Singh 12'; D. Tirkey 48'; G. Singh 53'	Report	Ali Khan 28', 59'; Butt 62', 63'

Umpires:
David Gentles (AUS)
Markus Mayer (GER)

==== Final ====
8 September 2002
15:00

Netherlands	0–0 (a.e.t.)	Germany
	Report
Penalties
Lomans (penalty shoot-out missed); Taekema (penalty shoot-out scored); De Nooijer (penalty shoot-out missed); Geeris (penalty shoot-out scored); R. Brouwer (penalty shoot-out scored)	3–2	(penalty shoot-out scored) Reinelt; (penalty shoot-out missed) Kunz; (penalty shoot-out missed) Witthaus; (penalty shoot-out missed) Crone; (penalty shoot-out scored) Weißenborn

Umpires:
Ray O'Connor (IRL)
David Leiper (GBR)

== Final standings ==
1. Netherlands
2. Germany
3. Pakistan
4. India
5. Australia
6. South Korea

== Awards ==
Top Goalscorer	Player of the Tournament	Goalkeeper of the Tournament	Most Promising Player
(Netherlands) Taeke Taekema	(India) Dhanraj Pillay	(Germany) Clemens Arnold	(South Korea) Seo Jong-ho
