= Julia Schlecht =

German volleyball player (born 1980)

Personal information
- Nationality: German
- Born: 16 March 1980 (age 46)
- Height: 1.82 m (6 ft 0 in)
- Weight: 67 kg (148 lb)
- Spike: 298 cm (117 in)
- Block: 277 cm (109 in)

Volleyball information
- Number: 6

Career
Years	Teams
2004	(Germany) TSV Bayer 04 Leverkusen

National team
2004	Germany Germany
Honours
Women's volleyball
Representing Germany
European Championship
Bronze medal – third place	2003 Ankara	Team competition
FIVB Grand Prix
Bronze medal – third place	2002 Hong Kong	Team competition

Julia Schlecht (born 16 March 1980) is a German former volleyball player. She was part of the Germany women's national volleyball team.

She competed with the national team at the 2004 Summer Olympics in Athens, Greece. She played with TSV Bayer 04 Leverkusen in 2004.

== Clubs ==
- (Germany) TSV Bayer 04 Leverkusen (2004)

== See also ==
- Germany at the 2004 Summer Olympics
