= Floris Evers =

Field hockey player

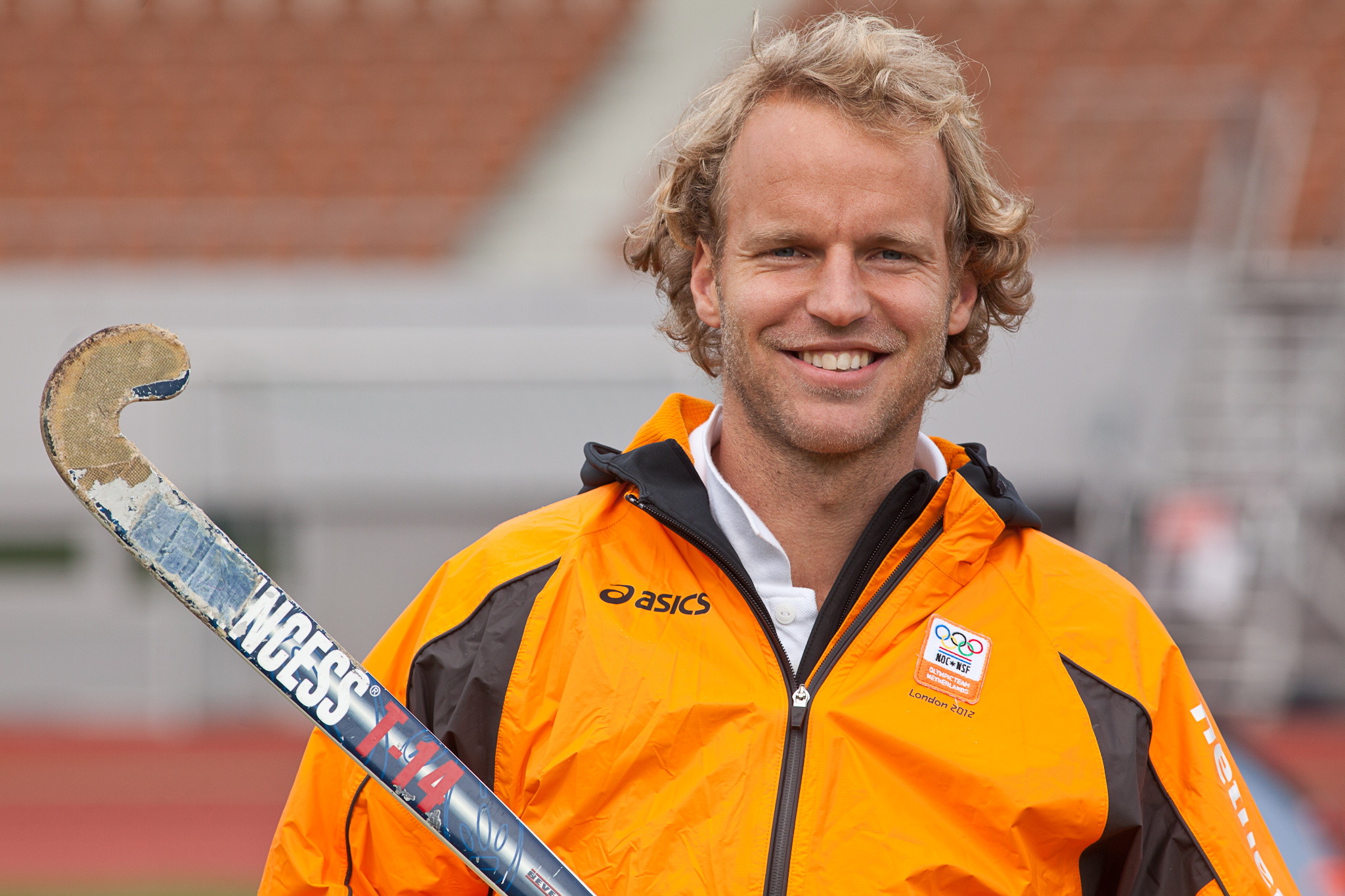
- Floris Evers in 2013

Personal information
- Full name: Floris Maarten Alphons Maria Evers
- Born: 26 February 1983 (age 43) Tilburg, Netherlands

Sport
- Sport: Field hockey
Senior career
Years	Team	Caps	Goals
–	Hattem	-	-
–	Groningen	-	-
–2006	SCHC	-	-
2006–2015	Amsterdam	-	-
National team
Years	Team	Caps	Goals
2002–2012	Netherlands	229	-
Medal record
Men's field hockey
Representing the Netherlands
Olympic Games
Silver medal – second place	2004 Athens	Team
Silver medal – second place	2012 London	Team
World Cup
Bronze medal – third place	2010 New Delhi	Team
EuroHockey Championship
Silver medal – second place	2005 Leipzig	Team
Gold medal – first place	2007 Manchester	Team
Silver medal – second place	2011 Gladbach	Team
Champions Trophy
Gold medal – first place	2002 Cologne	Team
Gold medal – first place	2003 Amstelveen	Team
Silver medal – second place	2004 Lahore	Team
Silver medal – second place	2005 Chennai	Team
Gold medal – first place	2006 Terrassa	Team
Bronze medal – third place	2007 Kuala Lumpur	Team

Floris Maarten Alphons Maria Evers (born 26 February 1983 in Tilburg, North Brabant) is a field hockey player from the Netherlands, who won the silver medal with the Dutch national team at the 2004 Summer Olympics and at the 2012 Summer Olympics. He was the captain of the team at the 2012 Summer Olympics. He has played in all the top leagues the world of field hockey. After the London Olympics, along with Teun de Noijer, he retired from international hockey. In 2013, he played with the Ranchi Rhinos in the Indian hockey league.

== Club career ==
He played most of his career for Amsterdam, where he announced his retirement in 2015. Since 2006, Evers had been playing at Amsterdam, with which he became the national champion in 2011 and 2012. Before that, he played for Groningen, Hattem and Stichtsche.
