= Björn Emmerling =

German field hockey player (born 1975)

Personal information
- Born: 16 November 1975 (age 50) Würzburg
- Height: 182 cm (6 ft 0 in)
- Weight: 81 kg (179 lb)

Sport
- Sport: Field hockey
Medal record
Men's field hockey
Representing Germany
Olympic Games
Bronze medal – third place	2004 Athens	Team
European Championship
Bronze medal – third place	2005 Leipzig	Team
Champions Trophy
Silver medal – second place	2000 Amstelveen	Team
Silver medal – second place	2002 Cologne	Team
Silver medal – second place	2006 Terrassa	Team

Björn Emmerling (born 16 November 1975 in Würzburg) is a field hockey player from Germany, who played for Harvestehuder THC and Hanauer THC in his native country. The defender made his international senior debut for the German team in 1996, and competed at three Summer Olympics. He retired from international play after the 11th World Cup, in Germany in September 2006 with 256 caps and 58 goals. In 2007, he received the town of Mönchengladbach "Sportler des Jahres" (Sportsman of the Year) award.

== International senior tournaments ==
- 1996 – Summer Olympics, Atlanta (4th place)
- 1998 – Champions Trophy, Lahore (6th place)
- 1999 – European Indoor Nations Cup, Slagelse (1st place)
- 1999 – European Nations Cup, Padova (1st place)
- 2000 – Champions Trophy, Amstelveen (2nd place)
- 2000 – Summer Olympics, Sydney (5th place)
- 2001 – European Indoor Nations Cup, Luzern (1st place)
- 2001 – Champions Trophy, Rotterdam (1st place)
- 2002 – World Cup, Kuala Lumpur (1st place)
- 2002 – Champions Trophy, Cologne (2nd place)
- 2003 – European Indoor Nations Cup, Santander (1st place)
- 2003 – World Cup Indoor, Leipzig (1st place)
- 2003 – 2003 Men's Hockey European Nations Cup|European Nations Cup, Barcelona (1st place)
- 2004 – Summer Olympics, Athens (3rd place)
- 2005 – World Games, Duisburg (1st place)
- 2005 – 2005 Men's Hockey European Nations Cup|European Nations Cup, Leipzig (3rd place)
- 2006 – 11th World Cup, Mönchengladbach (1st place)
