= Clemens Arnold =

German field hockey player

Personal information
- Born: 31 August 1978 (age 47) Melbourne, Australia

Sport
- Sport: Field hockey
- Position: Goalkeeper
Senior career
Years	Team	Caps	Goals
–	Heidelberg	-	-
–	Harvestehude	-	-
–	Dürkheim	-	-
–	Gladbach	-	-
National team
Years	Team	Caps	Goals
1997–2004	Germany		-
Medal record
Men's field hockey
Representing Germany
Olympic Games
Bronze medal – third place	2004 Athens	Team
World Cup
Gold medal – first place	2002 Kuala Lumpur	Team
EuroHockey Championship
Gold medal – first place	1999 Padua	Team
Gold medal – first place	2003 Barcelona	Team
Champions Trophy
Gold medal – first place	2001 Rotterdam	Team
Silver medal – second place	2000 Amstelveen	Team
Silver medal – second place	2002 Cologne	Team

Clemens Arnold (born 31 January 1978 in Melbourne, Victoria) is a field hockey goalkeeper from Germany, who was born in Australia. He was the goalkeeper for the German Men's National Team from 1998 to 2004. He retired from the national team after winning the bronze medal at the 2004 Summer Olympics in Athens.

== International senior tournaments ==
- 1999 – European Nations Cup, Padua (1st place)
- 2000 – Champions Trophy, Amstelveen (2nd place)
- 2000 – Summer Olympics, Sydney (5th place)
- 2001 – European Indoor Nations Cup, Luzern (1st place)
- 2001 – Champions Trophy, Rotterdam (1st place)
- 2002 – World Cup, Kuala Lumpur (1st place)
- 2002 – Champions Trophy, Cologne (2nd place)
- 2003 – European Nations Cup, Barcelona (1st place)
- 2004 – Summer Olympics, Athens (3rd place)
