= Justus Scharowsky =

German field hockey player

Personal information
- Born: 13 August 1980 (age 45)
Medal record
Men's field hockey
Representing Germany
Olympic Games
Bronze medal – third place	2004 Athens	Team
European Championship
Bronze medal – third place	2005 Leipzig	Team
Champions Trophy
Gold medal – first place	2007 Kuala Lumpur	Team
Silver medal – second place	2002 Cologne	Team
Silver medal – second place	2006 Terrassa	Team

Justus Scharowsky (born 13 August 1980) is a field hockey player from Germany, who plays for French club Racing Club de France. The midfielder made his international senior debut for the German team on 10 July 1999 in a friendly against South Korea in Leipzig. As of 12 November 2005, Scharowsky earned 93 caps for his native country, in which he scored fifteen goals.

== International senior tournaments ==
- 2002 – Champions Trophy, Cologne (2nd place)
- 2003 – Champions Trophy, Amstelveen (6th place)
- 2004 – Summer Olympics, Athens (3rd place)
- 2005 – European Nations Cup, Leipzig (3rd place)
- 2005 – Champions Trophy, Chennai (4th place)
- 2006 – Champions Trophy, Terrassa (2nd place)
- 2006 – 11th World Cup, Mönchengladbach (1st place)
- 2007 – European Nations Cup, Manchester (4th place)
- 2007 – Champions Trophy, Kuala Lumpur (1st place)
