= Mandy Haase =

German field hockey player

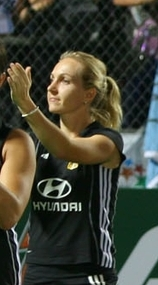
- Haase in 2010

Personal information
- Born: 25 June 1982 (age 44) Leipzig
- Height: 164 cm (5 ft 5 in)
- Weight: 58 kg (128 lb)

Sport
- Sport: Field hockey
Medal record
Women's field hockey
Representing Germany
Olympic Games
Gold medal – first place	2004 Athens	Team competition
European Championship
Gold medal – first place	2007 Manchester	Team competition
Silver medal – second place	2011 Gladbach	Team competition

Mandy Haase (born 25 June 1982 in Leipzig) is a field hockey defender from Germany, who won the gold medal with the German national team at the 2004 Summer Olympics in Athens, Greece. She made her debut for the national squad on 18 May 2003 with a victory in a friendly match against the Czech Republic (3–0).

His sister Lydia also is an international hockey player.

== International senior tournaments ==
- 2003 – European Nations Cup, Barcelona (third place)
- 2004 – Olympic qualifier, Auckland (fourth place)
- 2004 – Summer Olympics, Athens (first place)
- 2005 – European Nations Cup, Dublin (second place)
- 2005 – Champions Trophy, Canberra (fifth place)
- 2006 – Champions Trophy, Amstelveen (first place)
- 2006 – World Cup, Madrid (eighth place)
- 2007 – European Nations Cup, Manchester (first place)
- 2008 – Champions Trophy, Mönchengladbach (second place)
- 2008 – Summer Olympics, Beijing (fourth place)
- 2012 – Summer Olympics, London (seventh place)
