= Louisa Walter =

German field hockey player

Medal record

Representing Germany

Women's Field hockey

Olympic Games
Gold medal – first place	2004 Athens	Team

Louisa Walter (born 2 December 1978) is a German field hockey player. She was born in Düsseldorf. She won a gold medal at the 2004 Summer Olympics in Athens.
