= Mark Dragunski =

German handball player (born 1970)

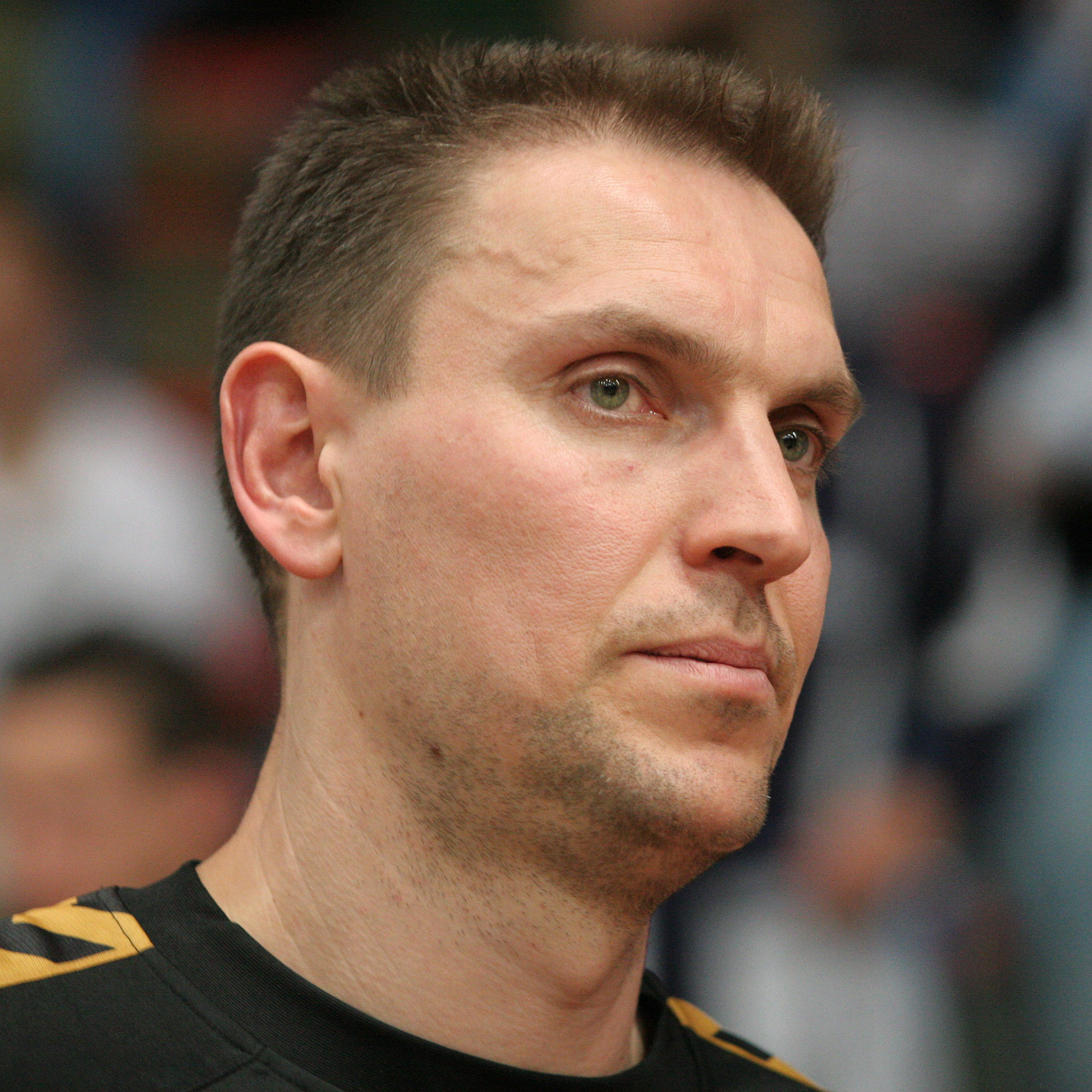

Personal information
- Nationality: German
- Born: 22 December 1970 (age 55) Recklinghausen, Germany
- Height: 2.14 m (7 ft 0 in)

Sport
- Sport: Handball
- Position: Pivot

Senior clubs
- Years: Team
- 1991-1993: Eintracht Hagen
- 1993-1997: TUSEM Essen
- 1997-1998: TuS Nettelstedt
- 1998-2002: TUSEM Essen
- 2002-2003: SG Flensburg-Handewitt
- 2003-2005: VfL Gummersbach
- 2005-2009: TUSEM Essen
National team
| Years | Team | Apps | (Gls) |
| 1994–2004 | Germany | 117 | (174) |

Teams managed
- 2012-2013: TUSEM Essen second team
- 2013-2015: TUSEM Essen
- 2015-2016: TUSEM Essen second team
- 2016-: Neusser HV youth
Medal record
Olympic Games
| Silver medal – second place | 2004 Athens | Team Competition |
World Men's Handball Championship
| Silver medal – second place | 2003 Portugal | Team competition |
European Championship
| Gold medal – first place | 2004 Slovenia | Team competition |
| Silver medal – second place | 2002 Sweden | Team competition |

Mark Dragunski (born 22 December 1970) is a former German team handball player and currently a coach. He received a silver medal at the 2004 Summer Olympics in Athens with the German national team. He is European champion from 2004. In the 2002 European Championship, where Germany finished second, he won the MVP award in the final.
