= Sonja Lehmann =

German field hockey player

Medal record

Representing Germany

Women's Field hockey

Olympic Games
Gold medal – first place	2004 Athens	Team

Sonja Lehmann (born 13 September 1979) is a German field hockey player. She was born in Berlin. She won a gold medal at the 2004 Summer Olympics in Athens.

She played for TuS Lichterfelde Berlin. In 2008, she married hockeyplayer Bastian Dittberner.
