= Maarten Froger =

Dutch field hockey player

Personal information
- Born: 17 May 1977 (age 49)

Sport
- Sport: Field hockey
National team
Years	Team	Caps	Goals
–	Netherlands	21	(4)
Medal record
Men's field hockey
Champions Trophy
Gold medal – first place	2002 Cologne	Team

Maarten Froger (born 17 May 1977) is a former field hockey striker from the Netherlands, who won the 2002 Champions Trophy with the Dutch Men's Team in Cologne, Germany. He played a total number of 21 international matches for Holland, in which he scored four goals.
