= Westende Hamborn =

German football club

- Full name: SV Schwarz-Weiß Westende Hamborn e.V.
- Founded: 1930
- Ground: Beeker Rönsbergerhof
- Capacity: 5,000
- League: Kreisliga C – Gruppe 3, Kreis Duisburg-Mülheim-Dinslak (X)
- 2015–16: 6th
| Home colours | Away colours |

Westende Hamborn is a German association football club from the district of Hamborn in Duisburg, North Rhine-Westphalia, a mining and steelworking region. The history of the club includes a number of worker's sports and football clubs.

== History ==
The team was established in 1930 as Sport-Verein Westende Laar and by 1937 was playing as BSG Bergbau Westende Hamborn. That season BSG won promotion out of the Bezirkskreise Niederrhein (II) to the Gauliga Niederrhein, one of sixteen regional first divisions established in the 1933 re-organization of German football under the Third Reich. They earned indifferent results there over the next three seasons and were relegated in 1941. BSG was renamed SV Westende-Laar Hamborn in 1942 and the team returned to first division play. They promptly took the division title in 1942–43 and advanced to the eighth final of the national playoffs where they were badly handled (8:0) by VfR Mannheim. After a second-place finish the next season, SV voluntarily withdrew from top-flight competition. They became part of the wartime side Kriegspielgemeinschaft Westende/Schwarz-Weiß Hamborn and took part in lower-level competition.

During this period Westende made appearances in the opening rounds of the Tschammerpokal tournament (1939, 1941, 1942), predecessor to today's DFB-Pokal (German Cup).

Following the end of World War II, occupying Allied authorities ordered the dissolution of most organizations in the country, including sports and football clubs. The club was re-established in 1945 as SV Westende Beeke and in 1947 merged with its wartime partner SV Schwarz-Weiß Hamborn to form SV Schwarz-Weiß Westende Hamborn. Schwarz-Weiß had merged with SV Bergbau Schacht 4/8 Hamborn in 1933 and after 1937 played as WKG Bergbau 4/8 Hamborn until again taking up the name Schwarz-Weiß in 1942.

Through the early 50s SW Westende played in the Amateurliga Niederrhein where their best results were a pair of fourth-place finishes. The footballers now compete in the Kreisliga A Duisburg-Mülheim-Dinslaken. The club today has a membership of about 650 and departments for badminton, gymnastics, handball, and judo.

The club now plays in the tier ten Kreisliga C after relegation from the Kreisliga A in 2011 and the Kreisliga B in 2013.

== Honours ==
- Gauliga Niederrhein (I)
  - Champions: 1943
