= Eike Duckwitz =

German field hockey player (born 1980)

Personal information
- Born: 29 May 1980 (age 46) Hamburg, West Germany

Sport
- Sport: Field hockey
- Position: Defender
Youth career
- Team
- –: Neumünster
Senior career
Years	Team	Caps	Goals
–	Kiel	-	-
–	Hamburg	-	-
National team
Years	Team	Caps	Goals
1998	Germany U18		-
1998–2001	Germanu U21		-
1999–2007	Germany	156	(4)
Medal record
Men's field hockey
Representing Germany
Olympic Games
Bronze medal – third place	2004 Athens	Team
World Cup
Gold medal – first place	2006 Mönchengladbach
European championship
Gold medal – first place	1999 Padua
Bronze medal – third place	2005 Leipzig
Champions Trophy
Gold medal – first place	2001 Rotterdam
Silver medal – second place	2000 Amstelveen
Silver medal – second place	2002 Cologne
Junior World Cup
Bronze medal – third place	2001 Hobart

Eike Duckwitz (born 29 May 1980) is a German former field hockey player who played as a defender for the German national team.

He is an Olympic medalist who competed in the 2004 Summer Olympics. He also competed in the 2006 World Cup, two European championships and four Champions Trophies.
