= SpVgg Cannstatt =

German football club

- Full name: Sportvereinigung Cannstatt e.V.
- Founded: 1897
- League: Bezirksliga (VIII)
- 2015–16: Kreisliga A Stuttgart 1 (IX), 1st (promoted)
Home colours	Away colours

Cannstatt SpVgg is a German association football club from the district of Bad Cannstatt in the city of Stuttgart, Baden-Württemberg. The club was established in 1897 as FC Stern Cannstatt and in 1919 merged with Fußballverein Cannstatt 07 to form Spielvereinigung Cannstatt. In 1933, SpVgg joined with Sportverein Cannstatt and took on its current name of Sportvereinigung Cannstatt. Partner SV had been formed in December 1923 through the union of the football departments of the gymnastics clubs Turnerbund Cannstatt and Turnverein Cannstatt.

== History ==
From 1935 to 1937 and again from 1939 to 1941 the team was part of the first division Gauliga Württemberg. They made appearances in play for the Tschammerpokal, predecessor of today's DFB-Pokal (German Cup) in 1939 and 1940, but went out in the opening round in each case. Following World War II, in 1946, the club was re-established as SKG Cannstatt. They re-adopted their historical identity as Sportvereinigung Cannstatt in 1950.

SpVgg remains active today with departments for handball, volleyball, cycling, tennis, swimming, gymnastics, and water polo. The footballers compete in the Kreisliga A, Bezirk Stuttgart (IX).
