= Christian Schulte =

German field hockey player

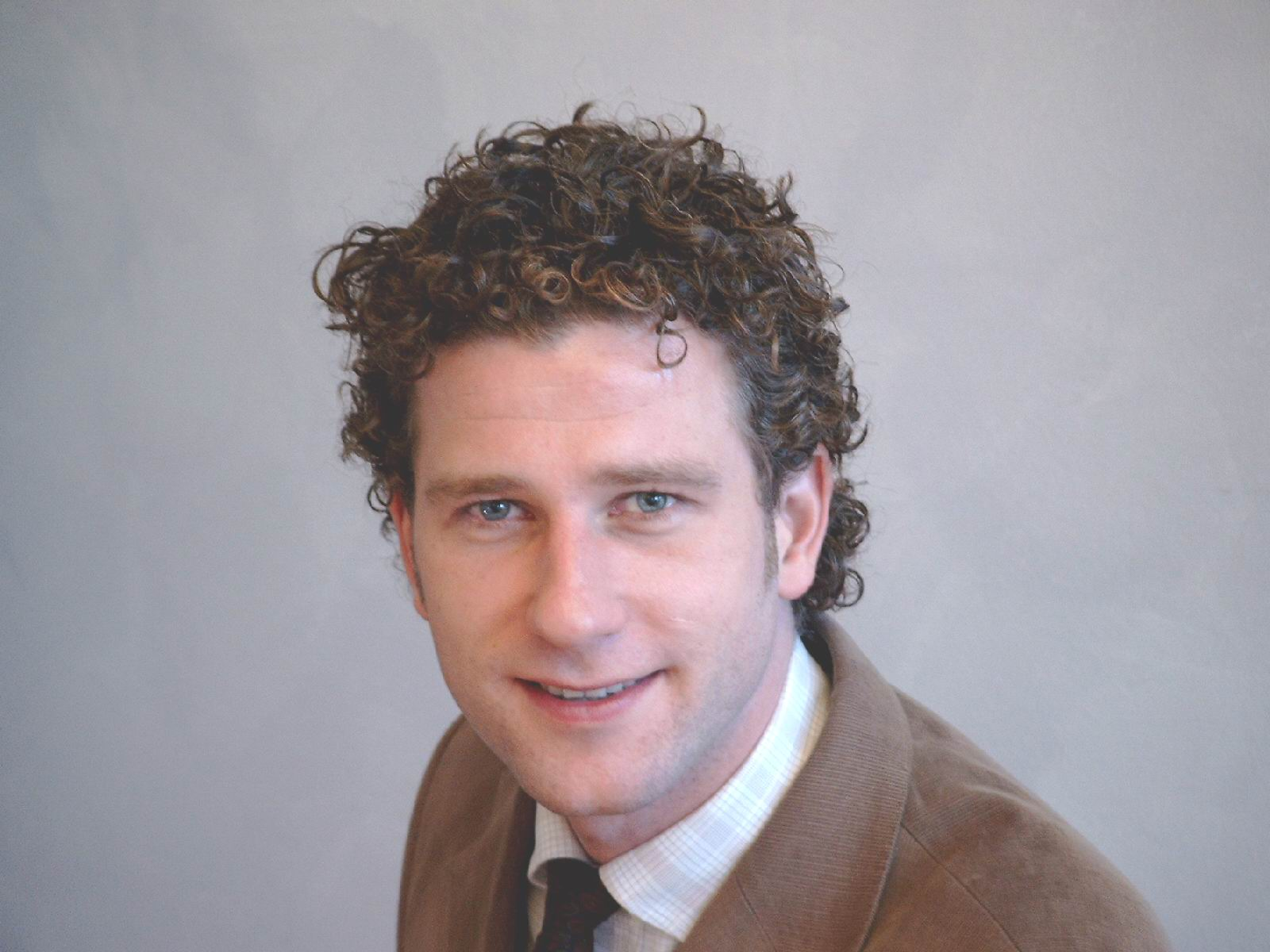

Personal information
- Born: 17 August 1975 (age 50) Neuss, West Germany

Sport
- Sport: Field hockey
- Position: Goalkeeper
Senior career
Years	Team	Caps	Goals
1980–1986	Grimlinghausen	-	-
1986–1992	Neuss	-	-
1992–2003	Crefeld	-	-
2003–2004	Barcelona	-	-
2004–2012	Crefeld	-	-
National team
Years	Team	Caps	Goals
–	Germany		-
Medal record
Men's field hockey
Representing Germany
Olympic Games
Bronze medal – third place	2004 Athens	Team
World Cup
Gold medal – first place	2002 Kuala Lumpur	Team
Gold medal – first place	2006 Mönchengladbach	Team
Champions Trophy
Gold medal – first place	2007 Kuala Lumpur	Team
Silver medal – second place	2002 Cologne	Team
Silver medal – second place	2006 Terrassa	Team

Christian Schulte (born 7 August 1975) is a German field hockey goalkeeper who competed in the 2004 Summer Olympics and in the 2008 Summer Olympics.
