= Philipp Crone =

German field hockey player (born 1977)

Personal information
- Born: 16 March 1977 (age 49) Cologne
- Height: 173 cm (5 ft 8 in)
- Weight: 82 kg (181 lb)

Sport
- Sport: Field hockey
Medal record
Men's field hockey
Representing Germany
Olympic Games
| Bronze medal – third place | 2004 Athens | Team |
World Cup
| Gold medal – first place | 2002 Kuala Lumpur | Team |
| Gold medal – first place | 2006 Mönchengladbach | Team |
| Bronze medal – third place | 1998 Utrecht | Team |
Champions Trophy
| Gold medal – first place | 1997 Adelaide | Team |
| Gold medal – first place | 2001 Rotterdam | Team |
| Silver medal – second place | 2000 Amstelveen | Team |
| Silver medal – second place | 2002 Cologne | Team |
| Silver medal – second place | 2006 Terrassa | Team |

Philipp Crone (born 16 March 1977 in Cologne) is a German former field hockey player who competed in the 2000 Summer Olympics and in the 2004 Summer Olympics.

After his time in sports, he worked as journalist for different German newspapers like Sueddeutsche Zeitung and for Bayerischer Rundfunk.
