= Sascha Reinelt =

German field hockey player

Personal information
- Born: 3 April 1973 (age 53) Sindelfingen, West Germany

Sport
- Sport: Field hockey
National team
Years	Team	Caps	Goals
1996–2004	Germany	49	-
Medal record
Men's field hockey
Representing Germany
Olympic Games
Bronze medal – third place	2004 Athens	Team
World Cup
Gold medal – first place	2002 Kuala Lumpur	Team
Bronze medal – third place	1998 Utrecht	Team
Champions Trophy
Gold medal – first place	2001 Rotterdam	Team
Silver medal – second place	2000 Amstelveen	Team
Silver medal – second place	2002 Cologne	Team
Bronze medal – third place	1996 Madras	Team

Sascha Reinelt (born 3 April 1973 in Sindelfingen) is a German former field hockey player who competed in the 2000 Summer Olympics and in the 2004 Summer Olympics.
