= Cycling at the 2008 Summer Olympics – Men's individual pursuit =

Men's individual pursuit at the Games of the XXIX Olympiad
- Olympic Track cycling
- Venue: Laoshan Velodrome
- Dates: August 15 (opening rounds); August 16 (final)
- Competitors: 18 from 11 nations
- Winning time: 4:15.977

Medalists
1st place, gold medalist(s)		Bradley Wiggins	Great Britain
2nd place, silver medalist(s)		Hayden Roulston	New Zealand
3rd place, bronze medalist(s)		Steven Burke	Great Britain

The men's individual pursuit at the 2008 Summer Olympics took place on August 16 at the Laoshan Velodrome. The pre-event favorite to win the gold medal was the defending Olympic champion Bradley Wiggins of Great Britain, who managed to retain the title, setting a new Olympic record in the preliminary round.

== Qualification ==
Eighteen cyclists qualified for this event. Bradley Wiggins (Great Britain), the defending Olympic champion, qualified for winning the individual pursuit at the 2008 UCI Track Cycling World Championships. Volodymyr Dyudya (Ukraine) qualified at the late 2007 UCI World Cup event in Sydney, winning the individual pursuit there. The qualifier by way of the UCI B World Championship was Alexandr Pliuschin (Moldova). Jenning Huizenga (Netherlands), Taylor Phinney (United States), Phillip Thuaux (Australia), Sergi Escobar Roure (Spain), Alexander Serov (Russia), and David O'Loughlin (Ireland) qualified based on UCI rankings. The rest of the field was formed by berths given to the ten nations that qualified in the team pursuit. This resulted in Great Britain, Australia, Netherlands, Spain, Ukraine, and Russia each having two competitors in this event.

== Competition format ==
The eighteen cyclists were matched into nine two-man heats. The riders start on opposite sides of the track from one another, held in place by a starting gate until the race begins. While the objective is ostensibly to catch the other rider on the track, victory is most commonly determined by the faster time to cover 4,000 meters. The winners of each individual heat did not matter in the preliminaries - it was instead the overall eight fastest times which would advance to the match round.

In the match round, the top eight riders from the preliminaries were matched together, 1 vs. 8, 2 vs. 7, 3 vs. 6, and 4 vs. 5, for the semifinals. In the semifinals, the winner of each match advanced to race for a medal; the two fastest raced for gold and silver, while the two slower winners faced each other for the bronze.

== Schedule ==
All times are China standard time (UTC+8)

Date	Time	Round
Friday, 15 August 2008	16:55	Qualification
Saturday, 16 August 2008	16:30	Match round
Saturday, 16 August 2008	18:50	Final

== Results ==
=== Qualification ===
Rank	Heat	Cyclist	Nation	Result	Notes
1	9	Bradley Wiggins	Great Britain	4:15.031	Q, OR
2	8	Hayden Roulston	New Zealand	4:18.990	Q
3	9	Alexei Markov	Russia	4:21.498	Q
4	6	Volodymyr Dyudya	Ukraine	4:21.530	Q
5	2	Steven Burke	Great Britain	4:22.260	Q
6	3	Antonio Tauler	Spain	4:22.462	Q
7	6	Taylor Phinney	United States	4:22.860	Q
8	5	Alexander Serov	Russia	4:23.732	Q
9	7	Bradley McGee	Australia	4:26.084	
10	5	Sergi Escobar	Spain	4:26.102	
11	7	David O'Loughlin	Ireland	4:26.102	
12	1	Brett Lancaster	Australia	4:26.139	
13	3	Jens Mouris	Netherlands	4:27.445	
14	4	Vitaliy Popkov	Ukraine	4:30.321	
15	1	Fabien Sanchez	France	4:33.100	
16	2	Carlos Alzate	Colombia	4:35.154	
17	4	Alexandr Pliuschin	Moldova	4:35.438	
18	8	Jenning Huizenga	Netherlands	4:37.097	

=== Match round ===
==== Semifinals ====
Qualification rule: Two fastest cyclists advance to the gold medal match (Q), while the next two to the bronze medal match (q).

Rank	Heat	Cyclist	Nation	Result	Notes
1	4	Bradley Wiggins	Great Britain	4:16.571	Q
2	3	Hayden Roulston	New Zealand	4:19.232	Q
3	1	Steven Burke	Great Britain	4:21.558	q
4	2	Alexei Markov	Russia	4:22.308	q
5	1	Volodymyr Dyudya	Ukraine	4:22.471	
6	2	Antonio Tauler	Spain	4:24.974	
7	4	Alexander Serov	Russia	4:25.391	
8	3	Taylor Phinney	United States	4:26.644	

==== Medal round ====
Bronze medal match

Rank	Cyclist	Nation	Result	Notes
3rd place, bronze medalist(s)	Steven Burke	Great Britain	4:20.947	
4	Alexei Markov	Russia	4:24.149	

Gold medal match

Rank	Cyclist	Nation	Result	Notes
1st place, gold medalist(s)	Bradley Wiggins	Great Britain	4:16.977	
2nd place, silver medalist(s)	Hayden Roulston	New Zealand	4:19.611	
