= Bradley Wiggins =

British former professional road and track racing cyclist

Sir Bradley Wiggins CBE
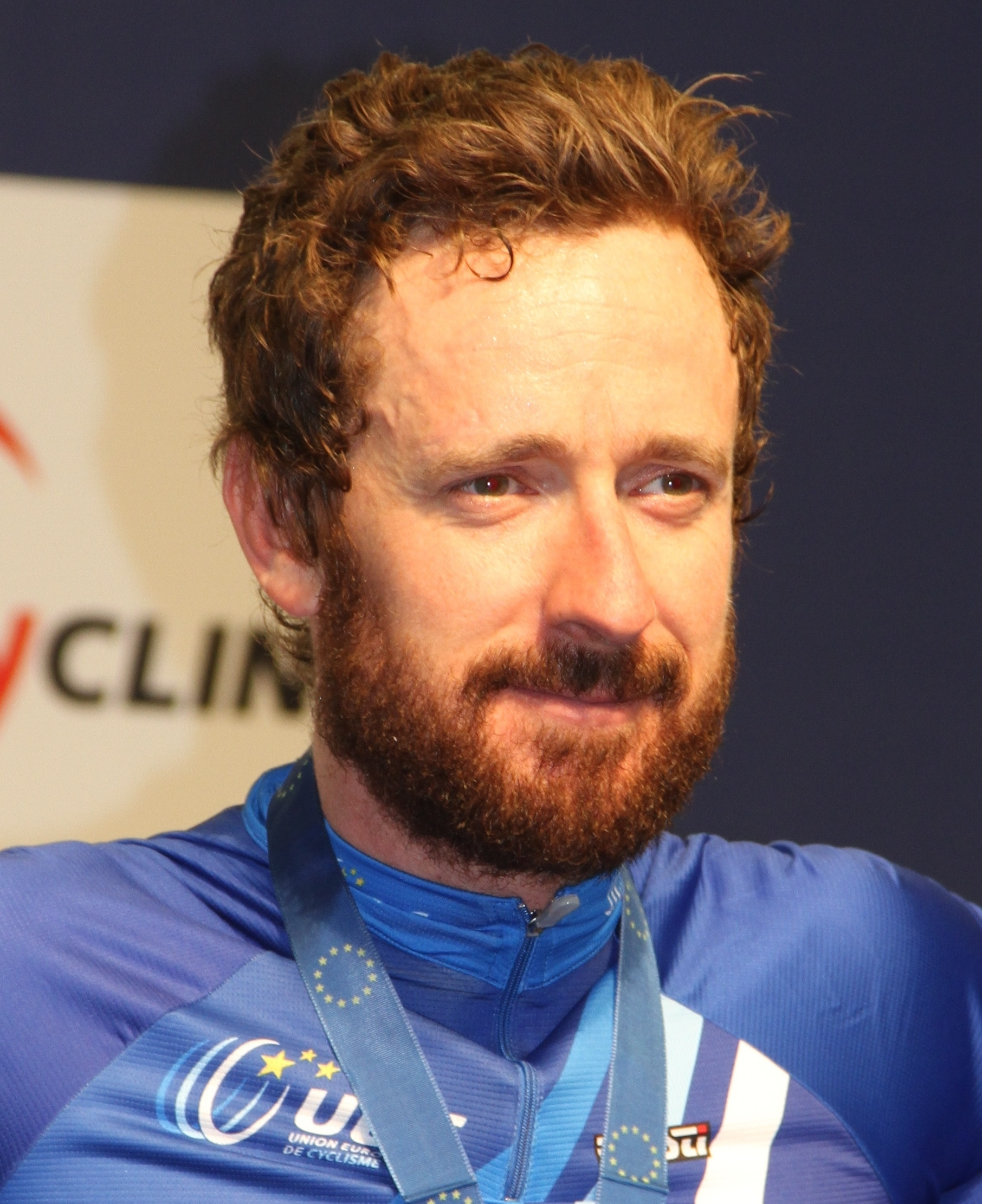
- Wiggins at the 2015 UEC European Track Championships

Personal information
- Full name: Bradley Marc Wiggins
- Nickname: Wiggo
- Born: 28 April 1980 (age 46) Ghent, Flanders, Belgium
- Height: 1.90 m (6 ft 3 in)
- Weight: 69 kg (152 lb; 10 st 12 lb)

Cycling career
- Sport: Cycling
- Current team: Retired
- Disciplines: Track; Road
- Role: Rider
- Rider type: Individual pursuit Time trialist All-rounder

Amateur teams
- –: Archer Road Club
- –: Olympia Sport
- –: Team Brite
- –: Sigma Sport

Professional teams
- 2001: Linda McCartney Racing Team
- 2002–2003: Française des Jeux
- 2004–2005: Crédit Agricole
- 2006–2007: Cofidis
- 2008: Team High Road
- 2009: Garmin–Slipstream
- 2010–2015: Team Sky
- 2015–2016: WIGGINS

Major wins
- Road Grand Tours Tour de France General classification (2012) 2 individual stages (2012) Giro d'Italia 1 individual stage (2010) 1 TTT stage (2013) Stage races Critérium du Dauphiné (2011, 2012) Paris–Nice (2012) Tour de Romandie (2012) Tour of Britain (2013) Tour of California (2014) One-day races and Classics Olympic Games Time Trial (2012) World Time Trial Championships (2014) National Road Race Championships (2011) National Time Trial Championships (2009, 2010, 2014) Track Olympic Games Individual pursuit (2004, 2008) Team pursuit (2008, 2016) World Championships Individual pursuit (2003, 2007, 2008) Team pursuit (2007, 2008) Madison (2008, 2016) Hour record holder (2015–2019) Other Vélo d'Or (2012)
Medal record
Event	1st	2nd	3rd
Summer Olympics	5	1	2
Road World Championships	1	2	0
Track World Championships	7	4	1
Commonwealth Games	0	4	0
European Track Championships	1	0	0
Total	14	11	3
Representing Great Britain
Men's road bicycle racing
Olympic Games
Gold medal – first place	2012 London	Time trial
World Championships
Gold medal – first place	2014 Ponferrada	Time trial
Silver medal – second place	2011 Copenhagen	Time trial
Silver medal – second place	2013 Florence	Time trial
Men's track cycling
Olympic Games
Gold medal – first place	2004 Athens	Individual pursuit
Gold medal – first place	2008 Beijing	Team pursuit
Gold medal – first place	2008 Beijing	Individual pursuit
Gold medal – first place	2016 Rio de Janeiro	Team pursuit
Silver medal – second place	2004 Athens	Team pursuit
Bronze medal – third place	2000 Sydney	Team pursuit
Bronze medal – third place	2004 Athens	Madison
World Championships
Gold medal – first place	2003 Stuttgart	Individual pursuit
Gold medal – first place	2007 Palma de Mallorca	Individual pursuit
Gold medal – first place	2007 Palma de Mallorca	Team pursuit
Gold medal – first place	2008 Manchester	Individual pursuit
Gold medal – first place	2008 Manchester	Team pursuit
Gold medal – first place	2008 Manchester	Madison
Gold medal – first place	2016 London	Madison
Silver medal – second place	2000 Manchester	Team pursuit
Silver medal – second place	2001 Antwerp	Team pursuit
Silver medal – second place	2003 Stuttgart	Team pursuit
Silver medal – second place	2016 London	Team pursuit
Bronze medal – third place	2002 Ballerup	Team pursuit
European Track Championships
Gold medal – first place	2015 Grenchen	Team pursuit
Representing England
Men's track cycling
Commonwealth Games
Silver medal – second place	1998 Kuala Lumpur	Team pursuit
Silver medal – second place	2002 Manchester	Individual pursuit
Silver medal – second place	2002 Manchester	Team pursuit
Silver medal – second place	2014 Glasgow	Team pursuit

Sir Bradley Marc Wiggins (born 28 April 1980) is a British former professional road and track racing cyclist, who competed professionally between 2001 and 2016. He became Great Britain's most decorated Olympian, amassing eight medals across five Games, and remains the only rider to have won World and Olympic titles on the track and road. In 2012, he was the first British winner of the Tour de France.

The son of the Australian cyclist Gary Wiggins, Wiggins was born to a British mother in Ghent, Belgium, and raised in London from the age of two. He competed on the track from the early part of his career until 2008. Between 2000 and 2008 he won ten medals at the track world championships, of which six were gold: three in the individual pursuit, two in the team pursuit and one in the madison. His first Olympic medal was a bronze in the team pursuit in Sydney 2000, before winning three medals including the gold in the individual pursuit at the Athens 2004, and two golds in the individual and team pursuit at the Beijing 2008.

On the road, Wiggins turned professional in 2001 but made it his focus from 2008. Initially viewed as a time trial specialist and rouleur, he showed his ability in stage races when he came fourth in the 2009 Tour de France; he was promoted to third after Lance Armstrong's results were annulled in 2012. He signed with the newly formed Team Sky in 2010, and in 2011 claimed his first victory in a major stage race in the Critérium du Dauphiné, as well as finishing third, later promoted to second, in the Vuelta a España. In 2012, Wiggins won the Paris–Nice, the Tour de Romandie, the Critérium du Dauphiné, and became the first British cyclist to win the Tour de France and the time trial at the 2012 Summer Olympics. Wiggins won Vélo d'Or award for best rider in 2012, the BBC Sports Personality of the Year Award and a knighthood as part of the 2013 New Year Honours. In 2014, he won gold in the time trial at the road world championships, and founded the WIGGINS cycling team. Wiggins returned to the track at the 2014 Commonwealth Games, and in 2015 he set a new hour record with a distance of 54.526 km (33.881 mi). In 2016, he won a further world championship in the madison, and gold in the team pursuit at the Olympics, his fifth successive medal winning appearance at the Games. He retired from all forms of professional cycling in 2016.

During his career and afterwards he faced allegations that he exploited a loophole in cycling's anti-doping regulations to use a performance-enhancing drug, injections of the powerful corticosteroid, triamcinolone. He did not receive any bans or suspensions in relation to doping during his career. In 2018, the British House of Commons Committee for Digital, Culture, Media and Sport concluded that Team Sky had used triamcinolone in 2012 under TUE (Therapeutic Use Exemption) "to prepare Bradley Wiggins, and possibly other riders supporting him, for the Tour de France. The purpose of this was not to treat medical need, but to improve his power to weight ratio ahead of the race."

== Early life and amateur career ==
Wiggins was born on 28 April 1980 in Ghent, Flanders, Belgium, to an Australian father, Gary Wiggins, and a British mother, Linda. His father lived in Belgium as a professional cyclist. His father left the family when Wiggins was two. Wiggins moved with his mother to her parents' house in Villiers Road, Willesden Green, northwest London, then to a Church Commissioners flat at Dibdin House estate in neighbouring Maida Vale. He was educated at St Augustine's junior school and then St Augustine's Church of England High School in Kilburn, where his mother was a secretary. He has a younger half-brother, Ryan, from his mother and her partner Brendan. Brendan and Linda separated when Wiggins was in his late teens.

Football was his first passion and he was an Arsenal fan, although he would watch rivals Tottenham Hotspur play because his friends supported them. He discovered cycling when his mother told him to watch the television coverage of the individual pursuit final of the 1992 Summer Olympics in Barcelona, which Briton Chris Boardman won. She explained it was one of the events at which his father had been successful. He watched the rest of the Olympics and fell in love with cycling and the Olympics itself.

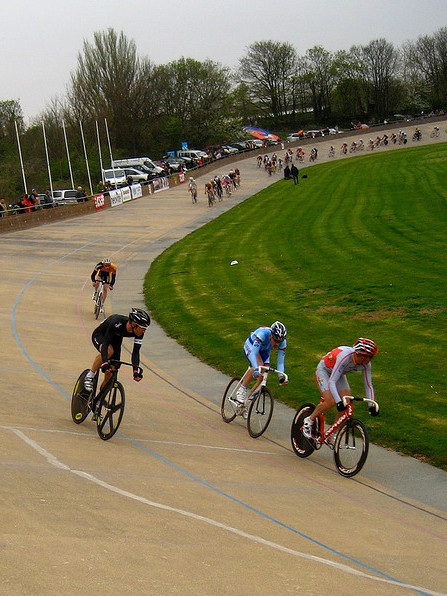
Wiggins began track cycling at the age of 12, at Herne Hill Velodrome, pictured in 2009.

In 1992, aged 12, he entered his first race, the West London Challenge 92, on the unopened A312 dual carriageway in Hayes, west London. Later that year he broke a collarbone in a road accident. He received £1,700 compensation for his injuries. He gave his mother £700 and used the rest to buy his first racing bicycle. "At 12", he recalled, "I told my art teacher, I'm going to be Olympic champion, I'm going to wear the yellow jersey in the Tour." He joined the Archer Road Club, where his father had been a member in the late 1970s. He raced at Herne Hill Velodrome and on the road around Crystal Palace National Sports Centre. He gained domestic sponsorship from Condor Cycles's Olympia Sport and then Team Brite. He represented Westminster in the London Youth Games as a teenager. In recognition of his early achievements, 2010 he was inducted into the London Youth Games Hall of Fame.

At 16, he won the 1 km (0.6 mi) time trial at the 1996 junior national track championships at Saffron Lane sports centre in Leicester. Selectors invited him to train at weekends at Manchester Velodrome. After leaving school he enrolled on a BTEC foundation course in business studies, but left due to cycling commitments. At the 1997 junior national track championships he won the one-kilometre time trial, 3 km (1.9 mi) individual pursuit, points race and scratch race. He was the only British competitor for the 1997 junior track world championships in Cape Town, coming 16th in the individual pursuit and fourth in the points race.

His breakthrough came in June 1998, winning the three-kilometre individual pursuit at the junior track world championships in Cuba, aged 18. The following week, he retained his titles at the junior national track championships in Manchester. He represented England at the Commonwealth Games in Kuala Lumpur, finishing fourth in the individual pursuit, and was a member of the team that won a silver medal in the team pursuit, his first senior medal. He became a full-time Lottery-funded athlete, with a grant of nearly £20,000 a year (equivalent to £39,000 in 2025).

In 1999, he began training with the Great Britain team pursuit squad and rode the PruTour – now known as the Tour of Britain, his first stage race at that level. In October he competed in the track world championships in Berlin, coming fifth in the team pursuit, and with partner Rob Hayles, came tenth in the Madison, securing qualification for the 2000 Summer Olympics in Sydney. At the Olympics he won a bronze medal in the team pursuit, beating France in the bronze medal match, and came fourth in the Madison with Hayles. In October 2000, he took silver in the team pursuit at the track world championships in Manchester, losing to Germany in the final by under half a second.

== Professional career ==
=== 2001–2004: Early years ===
In 2001, he signed for the Linda McCartney Racing Team, a British professional road cycling team, but it disbanded after internal problems. He was briefly seen in Sigma Sport colours after the collapse of the Linda McCartney team, but then secured further lottery funding, and began racing for the British national team. He came second in the prologue of the Tour of Rhodes, two seconds behind Fabian Cancellara of Mapei–Quick-Step, before winning the general classification in the Cinturón a Mallorca and Flèche du Sud. In September he crashed his bike, requiring two metal pins in his right wrist. Two weeks later he went to the track world championships in Antwerp, managing seventh place in the individual pursuit and consecutive silver in the team pursuit.

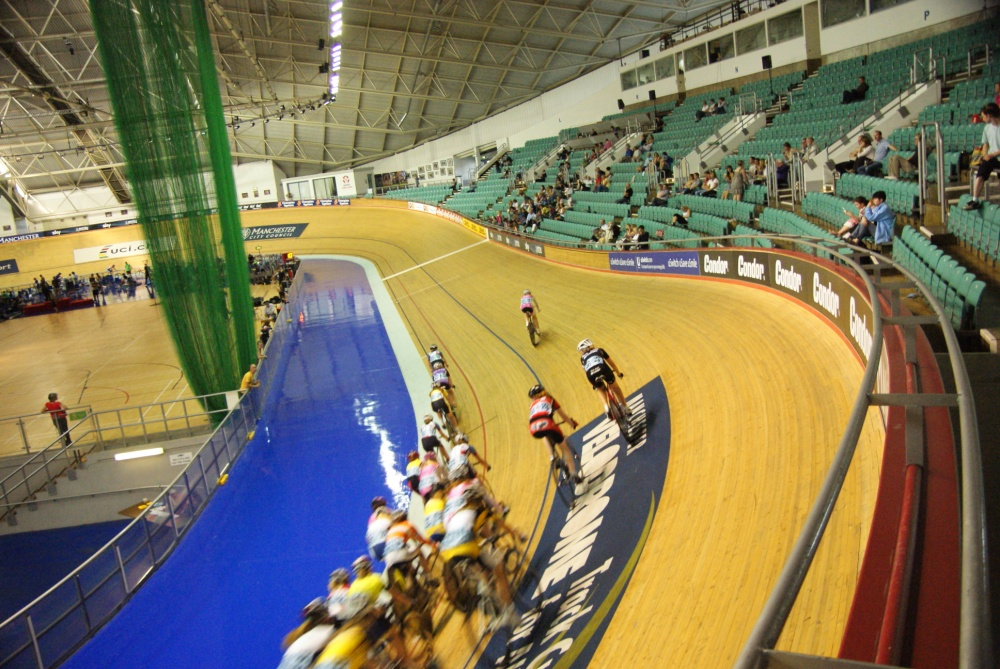
Manchester Velodrome, pictured in 2010, where Wiggins won two silver medals at the 2002 Commonwealth Games.

He joined the French team Française des Jeux in 2002, relocating to Nantes, and soon became homesick, finding it a huge contrast to the British Cycling set-up. At the Commonwealth Games in Manchester he won silver medals in the individual pursuit, losing to Française des Jeux teammate Bradley McGee (Australia) in the final, and team pursuit, beaten by Australia, who set a new world record with a time of three minutes and 59.583 seconds. At the track world championships in Copenhagen, he came fifth in the individual pursuit and won a bronze medal in the team pursuit. Wiggins was frustrated with his result in the individual pursuit at the world championships and became disillusioned with his future with Française des Jeux. British Cycling then enlisted the newly retired Chris Boardman as his mentor.

In May 2003, Wiggins made his Grand Tour debut at the Giro d'Italia. On the 18th stage he was eliminated from the race, finishing outside of the time limit in a group of 53 riders. In the summer he competed in the track world championships in Stuttgart, qualifying fastest in the individual pursuit, before beating Russia's Alexei Markov in the first round, setting up a place in the final against Australia's Luke Roberts. He beat Roberts by 0.736 seconds to win the gold medal, his first senior world title. He also came away with a silver medal in the team pursuit, beaten by Australia in the final, who broke their own world record with a time of three minutes and 57.280 seconds. In September, he won stage one of the Tour de l'Avenir, beating teammate Benoît Vaugrenard and Rabobank's Joost Posthuma by 14 seconds. In November, he won the Six Days of Ghent with Matthew Gilmore of Vlaanderen–T Interim.

At the 2004 Summer Olympics in Athens, Wiggins won a gold, silver and bronze medal in the Olympic Velodrome – becoming the first Briton to win three medals at one Games since Mary Rand in 1964.

Wiggins signed with Crédit Agricole for the 2004 season, advised by Boardman, who rode for them his entire professional road career. He began training for the 2004 Summer Olympics in Athens, at first struggling with illness and fitness, he arrived in peak form; he qualified for the individual pursuit with a time of four minutes and 15.165 seconds, an Olympic record and fifth fastest time in history. In the final, he beat McGee by over four seconds to win the gold medal. Wiggins was brought in to the team pursuit squad for the first round against France, replacing Bryan Steel, and advanced into the final, where the team were beaten by Australia, settling for the silver medal. Wiggins then partnered Rob Hayles in the Madison. With 90 laps left of the 200, Hayles crashed with Dutchman Robert Slippens, returning after a few laps. They lost a lap to their rivals, but with 30 to go Wiggins attacked, and they regained the lost lap, moving into second place. They lost points in the final sprint, moving them down to third, taking the bronze medal with 12 points, behind Switzerland on 15 and Australia on 22. Wiggins became the first British athlete in 40 years to win three medals at one Games, the last being Mary Rand at the 1964 Summer Olympics in Tokyo. On 31 December 2004, he was appointed an Officer of the Order of the British Empire (OBE) in the 2005 New Year Honours, for services to sport.

=== 2005–2007: On the road ===
In early 2005, he revealed his desire to compete in road cycling, and in April won the 16 km (9.9 mi) time trial around the town of Briey in northeastern France, on the second stage of the Circuit de Lorraine. In September he won his first race stage since 2001, stage eight of the Tour de l'Avenir; finishing with teammate Saul Raisin, with third-placed Steve Cummings (Landbouwkrediet–Colnago) coming in three minutes and 24 seconds later. Wiggins competed in the Giro d'Italia, finishing 123rd overall. He came seventh in the time trial at the road world championships in Madrid, one minute and 31 seconds down on winner Michael Rogers of Australia. He moved to Cofidis for the 2006 season, and was selected to ride in the Tour de France, finishing his first Tour in 124th place.

In March 2007, Wiggins returned to the track for the track world championships in Palma, Majorca, his first appearance at the championships since 2004. In the qualifying round for the individual pursuit, he set his second fastest time since his personal best at the Olympics in Athens, with a time of four minutes and 15.976 seconds; he beat Germany's Robert Bartko in the final to win the gold, catching him after 2750 m. He then went on to win gold in the team pursuit, beating Ukraine in the final. He finished in 13th place in the Madison, with Rob Hayles.

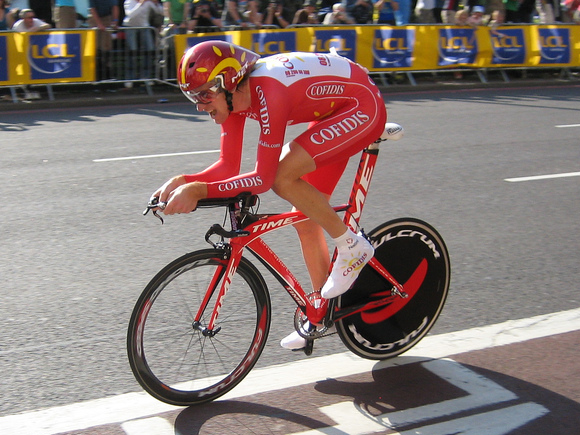
Wiggins finished fourth in the prologue of the 2007 Tour de France in London, riding in his second season for Cofidis.

On the road he won stage one of the Four Days of Dunkirk and the prologue of the Critérium du Dauphiné Libéré, before competing in the Tour de France and finishing fourth in the prologue in London. On stage six Wiggins launched a solo breakaway after 2 km (1.2 mi) of racing, leading the race for 190.5 km (118.4 mi), before being caught by the peloton with 7 km (4.3 mi) remaining. It was seen as a tribute to British rider Tom Simpson, on the 40th anniversary of his death in the 1967 Tour de France, but was a gift to his wife on her birthday, with Wiggins only finding out about the date's significance after the race. He received the stage's combativity award, for the most aggressive rider. Cofidis withdrew from the race before stage 16 after Cristian Moreni failed a doping test. Wiggins and his teammates were interviewed by police and had their hotel rooms searched. In the aftermath of the positive drug tests on Moreni and on race leader Alexander Vinokourov of Astana, Wiggins spoke out against dopers in the Tour and threw away his Cofidis kit in a bin in Pau Pyrénées Airport, vowing never to race for the team again.

Despite this, Wiggins continued racing for Cofidis, and in August he won the time trial on stage four of the Tour du Poitou-Charentes. In September, with teammate Michiel Elijzen, he won the Duo Normand, a two-man team time trial over a course of 53.4 km (33.2 mi). His season on the road ended riding for Great Britain at the road world championships in Stuttgart, coming tenth in the time trial, two minutes and ten seconds behind winner Cancellara of Switzerland; a result he was disappointed with, after hoping to finish on the podium.

In September, he signed for the T-Mobile Team – later known as Team High Road – for the 2008 season, joining compatriot Mark Cavendish, forming a partnership in the Madison. Their first race was the Six Days of Ghent in November, finishing in tenth place; Wiggins still riding for Cofidis. Wiggins then made his only appearance for the T-Mobile Track Team – which is separate from the road team – at the Beijing round of the 2007–08 Track World Cup Classics in December, winning gold in the individual pursuit and silver in the Madison with Cavendish.

=== 2008: Back to the track ===
For the 2008 season, Wiggins's focus was on the track and on the 2008 Summer Olympics in Beijing, deciding not to compete in the Tour de France. In February he travelled to the United States to train, and rode the Tour of California, coming second in the prologue, behind Cancellara (Team CSC).

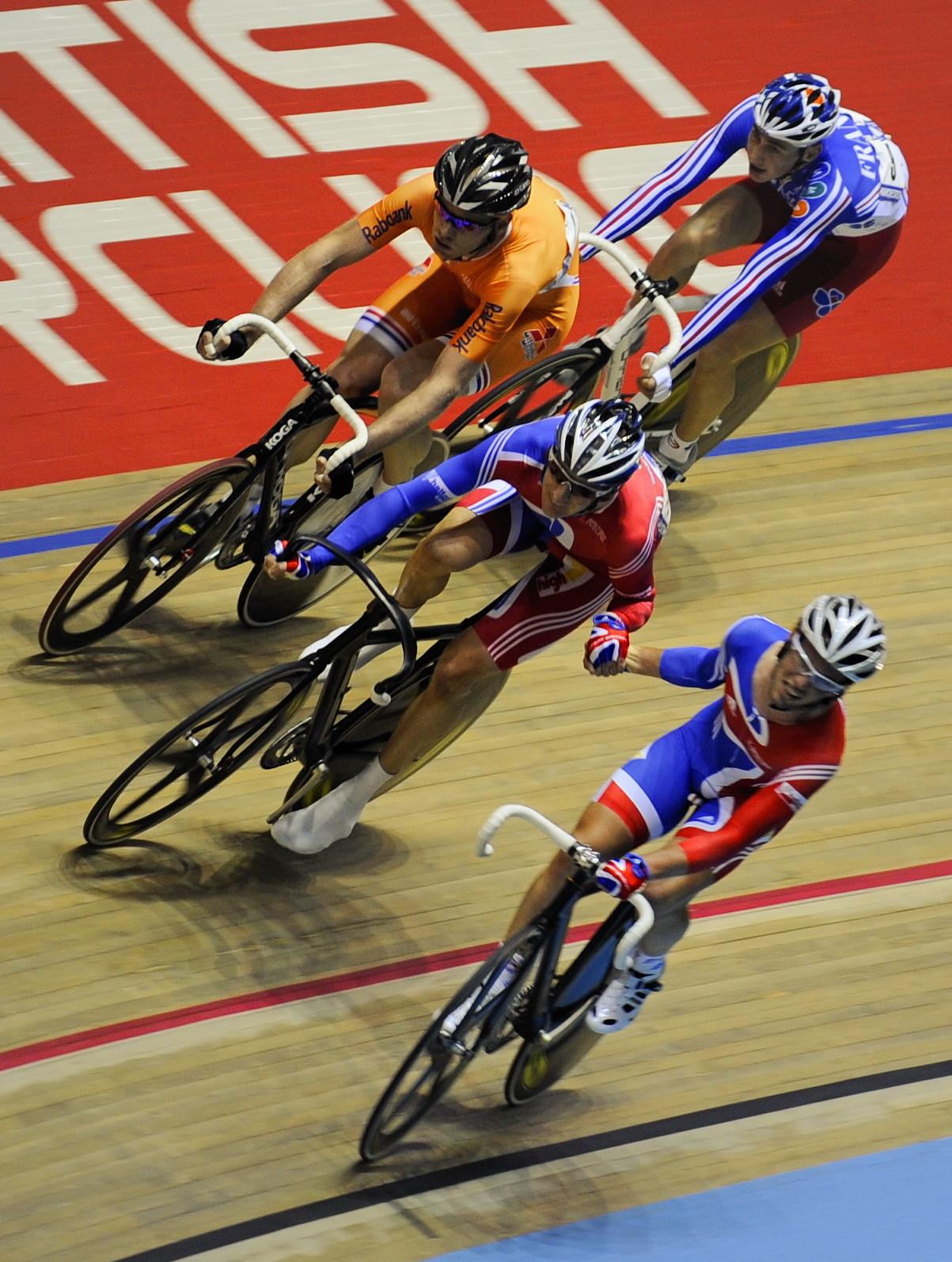
Mark Cavendish (foreground) handing over to Wiggins, on their way to winning gold in the Madison at the 2008 track world championships in Manchester.

In March, Wiggins competed in the track world championships in Manchester, defending his individual pursuit title by beating Dutchman Jenning Huizenga in the final, his third world title in the discipline. He then won the team pursuit, setting a new world record of three minutes and 56.322 seconds in the final against Denmark. Wiggins was due to partner with Hayles in the Madison, but Hayles failed a routine blood test, and was subsequently banned for two weeks. Cavendish was then brought in as his replacement. At around halfway through the race they appeared to be out of contention, with their closest rivals all gaining a lap; but with 35 laps left to race, Wiggins launched an attack which helped them reach the field ten laps later, taking the lead, due to their superior points they had collected in the sprints. They held on to win the gold medal, finishing with 19 points, ahead of Germany on 13.

Wiggins then rode the Tour de Romandie and the Giro d'Italia, as preparation for the Olympics in August. At the Giro, he was part of the lead-out train that helped Cavendish win two stages. Wiggins came fourth in the final stage's 28.5 km (17.7 mi)-long time trial in Milan, six seconds behind teammate Marco Pinotti, finishing the race in 134th place, three hours, one minute and 39 seconds down on overall winner Alberto Contador of Astana.

At the Olympics, he began the defence of his title in the individual pursuit, qualifying with a time of four minutes and 15.031 seconds, breaking his own Olympic record from 2004. In the semi-final he beat Russia's Alexander Serov, before taking gold in the final against Hayden Roulston of New Zealand, becoming the first rider to defend an Olympic pursuit title successfully. He was a member of the team pursuit that broke the world record in the heats with a time of three minutes and 55.202 seconds. The following day, the team won the gold medal, beating Denmark by 6.7 seconds with another new world record of three minutes and 53.314 seconds, averaging a speed of 61.719 km/h (38.4 mph). He paired with Cavendish in the Madison, and as the reigning world champions, they were favourites for the gold medal, but they only finished ninth. Cavendish felt that Wiggins had not performed to the best of his ability in the Madison.

In September, Wiggins joined the American team Garmin–Slipstream for the 2009 season. On 14 December, he came ninth in the BBC Sports Personality of the Year Award, with 5,633 votes, and was a member of the British cycling team that won the Team of the Year Award. On 31 December, he was appointed Commander of the Order of the British Empire (CBE) in the 2009 New Year Honours.

=== 2009: Tour de France breakthrough ===
Wiggins switched his focus to road and moved with his family to the city of Girona in north-east Spain, where Garmin–Slipstream were based. He started the season in February by helping the team win the opening team time trial of the Tour of Qatar, crossing the line first to take the leaders jersey. In March, he came second to Contador in the opening time trial of Paris–Nice, before riding Milan–San Remo and then placing second in the time trial at Critérium International. In April, he won the time trial on the final stage of the Three Days of De Panne, twenty seconds ahead of Vacansoleil rider Lieuwe Westra in second place, then had top-30 finishes in the Classics: Gent–Wevelgem and Paris–Roubaix. After finishing in 71st position in the Giro d'Italia and taking second place in the 14.4 km (8.9 mi)-long time trial on the final stage in Rome, he won the Beaumont Trophy, a domestic one-day race in Northumberland, using it as preparation for the Tour de France three weeks later.

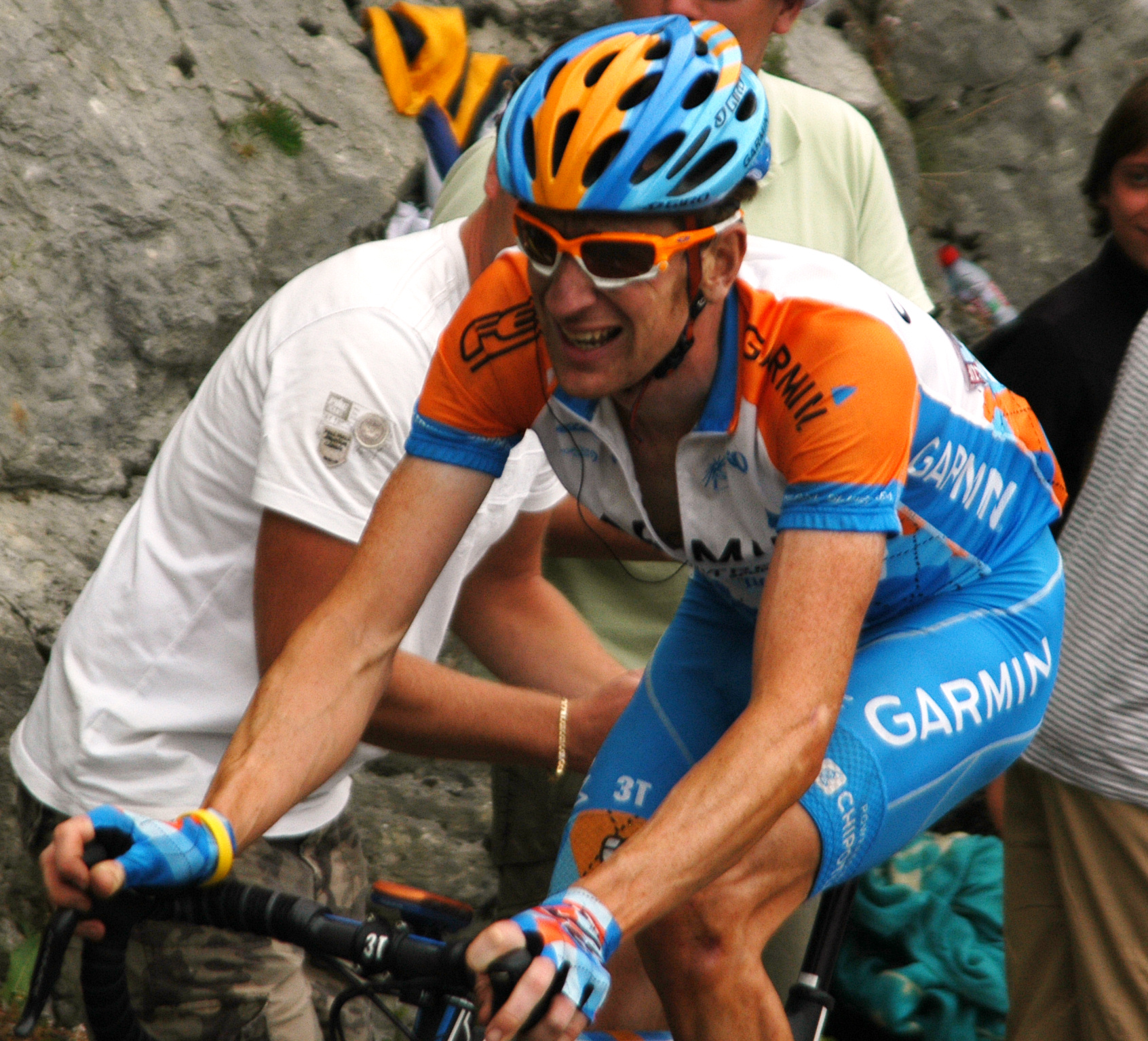
Wiggins finished fourth in the 2009 Tour de France (later promoted to third after Lance Armstrong's results were annulled in 2012), riding for Garmin–Slipstream. Pictured on stage 17, riding the Col de la Colombière.

Wiggins arrived at the Tour de France having lost 6 kg (13.2 lb), and was nicknamed "Twiggo", instead of the usual "Wiggo". He came third in the time trial on stage one in Monaco, 19 seconds behind Team Saxo Bank's Cancellara and one behind Contador. He then helped Garmin–Slipstream to second in stage four's team time trial, despite losing four riders. On stage seven he finished 12th in the first mountain finish and was in fifth place overall at the beginning of the second week. On stage fifteen in Verbier – the second mountain finish, Wiggins finished fifth, rising to third place overall. On stage 17 Contador, Andreas Klöden (Astana) and Team Saxo Bank riders Fränk and Andy Schleck attacked on the final climb – the Col de la Colombière, measuring 7.5 km (4.7 mi) at an average gradient of 8.5%, and was left with Astana's Lance Armstrong and Vincenzo Nibali of Liquigas, who let Wiggins do all the work before attacking one-kilometre from the summit. Wiggins failed to gain time on the descent and finished three minutes and seven seconds down on winner Fränk Schleck, dropping to sixth overall.

Wiggins moved back up to fourth, after finishing in second place in the time trial on stage 19, finishing in sixth place 42 seconds down on winner Contador. On stage 20 to Mont Ventoux, Wiggins was dropped by the yellow jersey group 1.4 km (0.9 mi) from the summit, finishing in tenth place and kept fourth overall, three seconds ahead of Fränk Schleck; he held that position in the final stage, equalling Robert Millar's highest ever finish by a British rider in the Tour. In October 2012, following the disqualification of Armstrong, who had originally placed third in the general classification, Wiggins was promoted to third place overall. This decision retroactively gave him the first podium finish by a British rider in Tour de France history.

In September, Wiggins won the national time trial championship in Buckinghamshire, and also in September at the road world championships in Mendrisio, Switzerland, was on course for a bronze medal in the time trial, until a mechanical problem and a delay getting a replacement bike ended with him finishing in 21st place. In October, he ended the season by winning the Herald Sun Tour in Victoria, Australia, after helping teammates for most of the race. He led the race after winning the time trial on stage five in Geelong, beating second-placed teammate Svein Tuft by fourteen seconds.

Wiggins had been contracted to ride for Garmin Slipstream again in 2010, but it was announced on 10 December that he was to leave to join Team Sky, having signed a four-year contract with the new British team.

=== 2010: Move to Team Sky ===
Wiggins began 2010 as a team leader for the first time and his main target was to win the Tour de France. In February, he was part of the team that won the opening team time trial of the Tour of Qatar, before taking second place in the time trial on stage four of the Vuelta a Andalucía, behind Alex Rasmussen of Team Saxo Bank. He then went on to finish third at the Vuelta a Murcia in March, behind winner František Raboň of Team HTC–Columbia and Rabobank rider Denis Menchov in second.

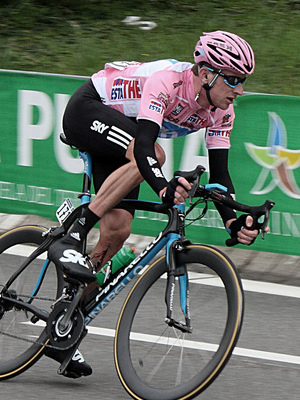
Wiggins wearing the leader's pink jersey, following his win in opening time trial of the 2010 Giro d'Italia – his first win in a Grand Tour, riding in his first season for Team Sky.

In May, Wiggins took his first Grand Tour victory on the wet streets of Amsterdam in the opening time trial of the Giro d'Italia, becoming the second Briton to wear the pink jersey after Cavendish in 2009. A series of crashes on the second stage put him 32 seconds behind in the general classification to the new leader Cadel Evans (BMC Racing Team). Another crash on stage three cost him a further three minutes and 58 seconds. He recovered time on stage 11, finishing fourth, from a group of 56 riders, and lay tenth overall. He faded quickly towards the end of the race, however, losing time in the final stages. He came seventh in the 15.3 km (9.5 mi) final time trial in Verona. He finished the race 40th overall, one hour, 47 minutes and 58 seconds behind overall winner Ivan Basso of Liquigas–Doimo. Throughout the race he told the press he was saving himself for the Tour de France, when asked about his form, but in fact felt physically unfit.

Wiggins then went to a training camp in the Alps, testing the mountain stages used for the Tour; he struggled to find his fitness. He made a poor start in the Tour, taking 77th place in the prologue after an early starting position left him exposed to poor conditions. He finished eighth on stage three, as cobblestones troubled a number of favourites, but on stage eight at Morzine-Avoriaz, the first mountain summit finish of the Tour, he could only manage 19th place, losing one minute and 45-second to stage winner Andy Schleck (Team Saxo Bank). The following day, he lost more time, coming 13th and losing four minutes and 55 seconds to the main contenders. He finished in 36th place on stage fourteen, falling to 18th overall, 11 minutes and 30 seconds behind race leader Andy Schleck; to the press he described his form as "consistently mediocre". On stage 19's time trial from Bordeaux to Pauillac, he finished in ninth place, three minutes and 33 seconds behind winner Cancellara. Wiggins finished the Tour in 24th place, 39 minutes and seven seconds down on winner Contador and seven places behind teammate Thomas Löfkvist. In February 2012, Contador was found guilty of doping and Wiggins's overall position was upgraded to 23rd.

He returned to racing in August, at the GP Ouest–France in Plouay. In September, he retained his title at the national time trial championships, around the 52.7 km (32.7 mi)-long course in South Wales, before finishing the season at the Tour of Britain. His season ended at the Giro di Lombardia, where he was forced to abandon following a crash. Over the winter he trained with the Great Britain squad at Manchester Velodrome.

=== 2011: Dauphiné and Vuelta ===
Wiggins was team leader of Team Sky again at the start of 2011. He opted not to enter the Giro d'Italia, concentrating instead on shorter events and the classics before undertaking altitude training to improve his climbing for the Tour de France. His season began at the Tour of Qatar in February, before winning the team pursuit at the Manchester round of the 2009–10 Track World Cup Classics, with a time of three minutes 55.438, the fifth-fastest time. He then came second in the 27 km (16.8 mi)-long time trial on the sixth stage of the Paris–Nice in March, 20 seconds behind Tony Martin of HTC–Highroad. He finished third overall, behind Martin and Team RadioShack rider Andreas Klöden. In April, he rode Paris–Roubaix, and then the Tour de Romandie, finishing third in time trial on stage and helped lead-out teammate Ben Swift to victory on the final stage. In March, he finished second in the time trial on the third stage of the Critérium International, four seconds down on Klöden. In May, he won the 26 km (16.2 mi)-long time trial on stage four of the Bayern Rundfahrt, beating Leopard Trek's Cancellara by 33 seconds, and finished the event in 14th place overall, while also helping teammate Geraint Thomas to win the event.

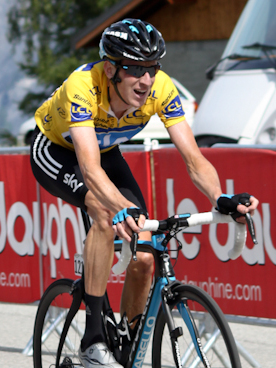
Wiggins in the yellow jersey, finishing the 2011 Critérium du Dauphiné, to take his first overall victory in a major stage race.

He then went for altitude training in the Alps, in preparation for the Tour. He took the overall lead in the Critérium du Dauphiné after finishing second in the time trial on stage three. On the final three mountain stages, Wiggins maintained his lead over second-placed Evans to win the race, at that time his biggest victory on the road. In June, Wiggins won the national road race championship in Northumberland. On the seventh stage of the Tour, a crash around 40 km (24.9 mi) from the finish in Châteauroux forced Wiggins to retire from the race with a broken collarbone.

After he had recovered from his injuries, Team Sky confirmed that Wiggins would ride in the Vuelta a España for the first time, as well as in the road world championships. Wiggins also confirmed that he would take part the Tour in 2012, even though the Olympics would follow soon after. The Vuelta and the world championships were seen as a dress rehearsal for 2012. He had a difficult start to the Vuelta, as Team Sky finished 42 seconds behind winners Leopard Trek in the opening team time trial in Benidorm, but a strong first week brought him back into contention, leaving him twentieth overall after stage eight. On stage nine, Wiggins and teammate Chris Froome attacked on the final climb to finish fourth and fifth respectively, gaining time on Team Katusha rider Joaquim Rodríguez, Michele Scarponi (Lampre–ISD) and other contenders. Wiggins was expected to take the overall lead in the time trial on the following day, but Froome confounded expectations by finishing second on the stage, and Wiggins only rose to third overall. He eventually took the lead after the rest day. Stage fourteen saw Wiggins and Froome gaining on most of their rivals. However, Wiggins lost the lead to Geox–TMC's Juan José Cobo on stage fifteen, when he finished fifth on the climb up the Angliru and dropped to third in the standings, behind Froome, who was second. Wiggins finished the Vuelta in third place – his first podium finish in a Grand Tour. In July 2019, Wiggins was retrospectively promoted to second place in the Vuelta after the UCI stripped Cobo of the win for an anti-doping violation.

In September, he competed in the road world championships in Copenhagen, he won the silver medal in the 46.3 km (28.8 mi) time trial, finishing one minute and fifteen seconds behind Germany's Martin, and four seconds ahead of reigning champion Cancellara (Switzerland) in third. Four days later, he was part of the Great Britain team that set up Cavendish's victory in the road race; Wiggins took over lead on the final lap of 17 around the 14 km (8.7 mi) circuit, setting a high pace to chase down the breakaway and stop attacks from developing.

=== 2012: Tour de France and Olympic gold ===
In 2012, Wiggins continued to focus on road racing. The individual pursuit was removed from the programme at the Olympics later in the year, and in December 2011 coach Rod Ellingworth told The Guardian, "The chances of him doing the team pursuit are really slim now". He began his 2012 season with third place in the Volta ao Algarve, including victory in the concluding time trial, edging out world champion Martin (Omega Pharma–Quick-Step) by less than a second.

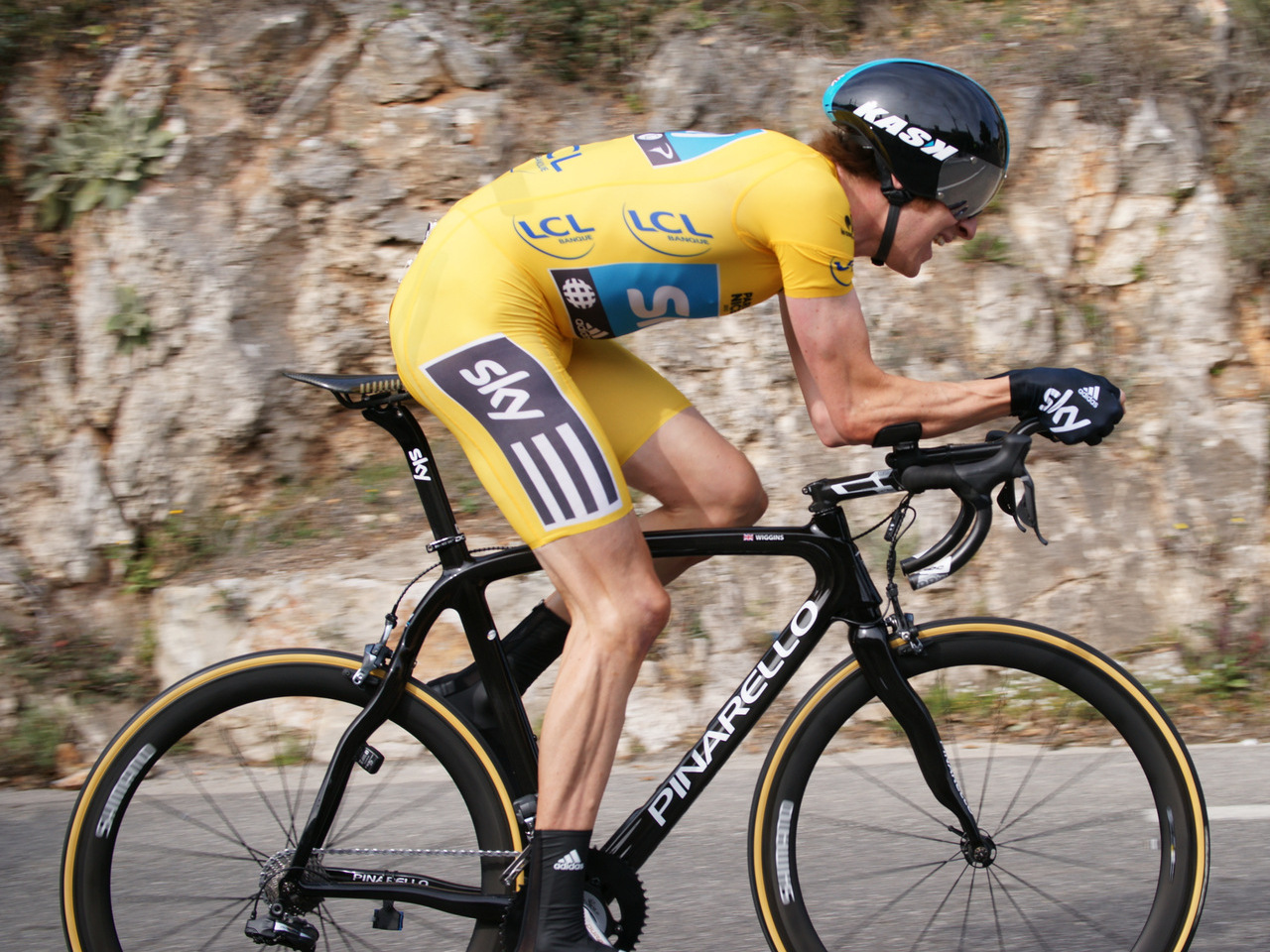
Wiggins riding the time trial on the final stage of the 2012 Paris–Nice, which he won, claiming the general classification.

In March, Wiggins finished second in the opening time trial of the Paris–Nice, one second behind Vacansoleil–DCM's Gustav Larsson, who avoided the wet conditions, unlike Wiggins and the other favourites that set off later in the day. The following day, he took the lead in the race after being part of a 30-man breakaway as the peloton split into echelons. He held the lead for the rest of the event, winning the final stage, a time-trial on the Col d'Èze, to win the race by eight seconds overall and become the first British rider to win the race since Tom Simpson in 1967. His final stage victory was also good enough to give him the points classification. Wiggins's time is the fastest time for the traditional time-trial on the Col d'Èze.

On the stage one of the Tour de Romandie in April, Wiggins took a rare sprint victory from a group of 59 riders. He lost the jersey to Rabobank rider Luis León Sánchez after Sánchez won two consecutive stages, but won the final time trial, despite suffering a dropped chain, to take the overall victory and become the first Briton to win the race in its 65-year history.

In June, Wiggins competed in the Critérium du Dauphiné, and began the defence of his title with a second-place finish in the prologue, one second behind Team Jayco–AlUla's Luke Durbridge. He took the overall lead the following day, after Durbridge was dropped on one of the stage's six climbs. Wiggins won the fourth stage of the race, a time trial over a course of 53.5 km (33.2 mi), 34 seconds ahead of Martin, his nearest rival, extending his lead over him to 38 seconds. He held the lead to the end, eventually winning by over a minute, with teammate Rogers in second place.

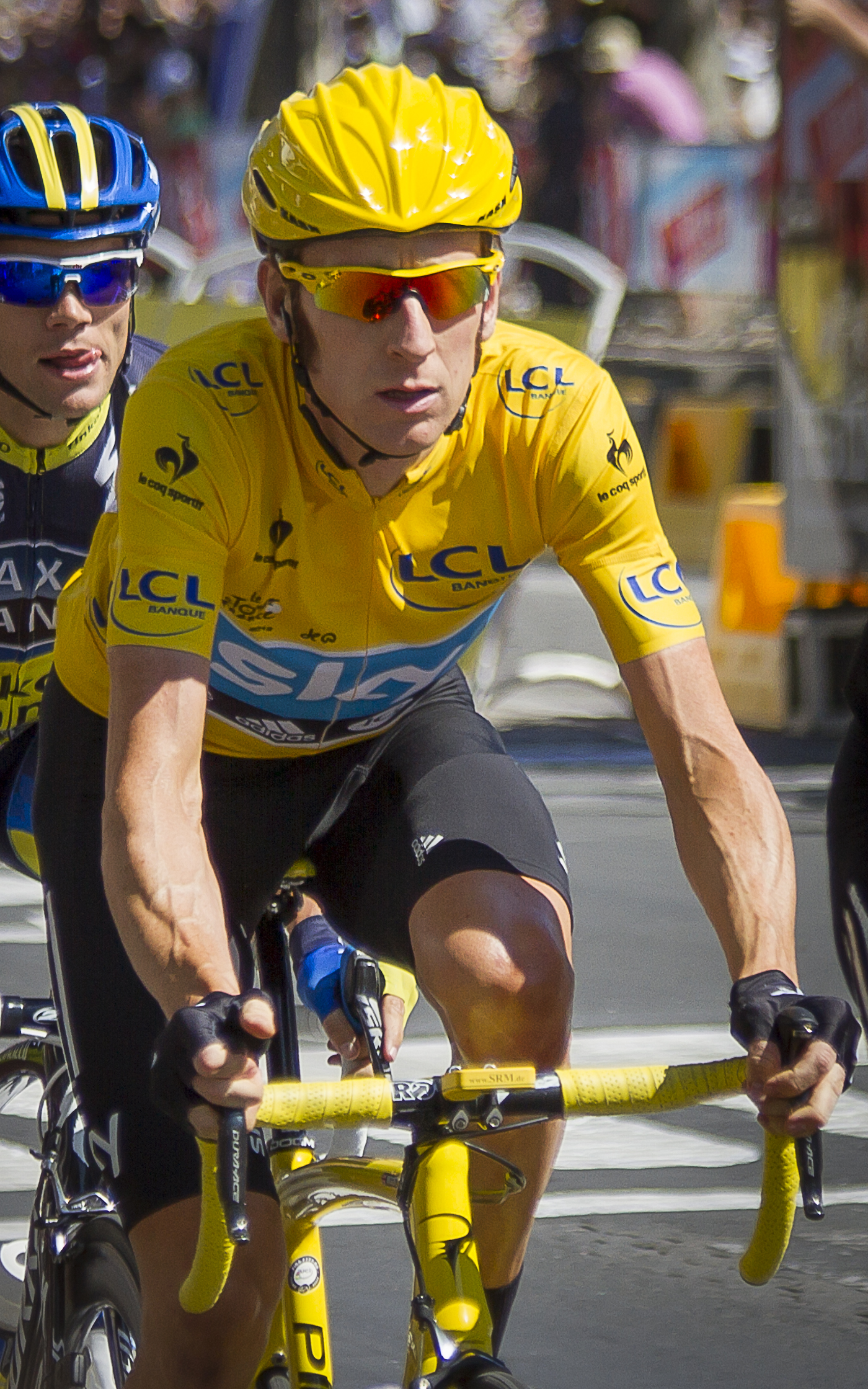
Wiggins in yellow, on his way to victory in the 2012 Tour de France in the ceremonial stage in Paris.

Wiggins entered the Tour de France as one of the favourites to win it. Wiggins began the Tour with second place in the prologue, behind Cancellara of RadioShack–Nissan. He took over the yellow jersey by finishing third on stage seven, the first mountaintop finish, becoming the fifth British rider to wear the jersey, and first since David Millar in 2000. Wiggins won the time trial on stage nine. On stage ten, he and his team staved off an attack by Nibali on the descent of the Col du Grand Colombier, with Nibali subsequently accusing Wiggins of disrespecting him: "According to Nibali, Wiggins taunted him at the finish. He turned, looked him in the face and waved". Wiggins extended his lead on stage 11 after Froome helped him to bridge across to his rivals, who had attacked on the finishing climb to La Toussuire. Froome accelerated about 4 kilometres (2.5 mi) from the finish, and was ordered via his team radio to wait for his leader.

During stage fourteen, a mountain stage, a spectator threw carpet tacks onto the narrow road at the top of the Mur de Péguère climb. Several riders suffered punctures, including Evans, the defending champion, who lost approximately two minutes while his team repaired his bicycle. Wiggins and his fellow members of Team Sky emerged without a puncture. Believing that a puncture resulting from an unfortunate incident should not determine the fate of a competitor, Wiggins then had his teammates and the rest of the peloton slow down to allow Evans and other affected cyclists to catch up. It was perceived as a generous act of sportsmanship and Wiggins was called "Le Gentleman" as a result. On stage 16, Wiggins and Froome were able to follow attacks by Nibali on the final climb of the day and finished with the same time as the Italian. On stage 17, the final mountain stage, Froome and Wiggins finished together in second and third place respectively, with Nibali coming in 19 seconds later. Wiggins won the time trial on stage 19, giving him a lead of three minutes and 21 seconds at the start of the final stage. On that stage, Wiggins helped teammate Cavendish achieve his fourth consecutive victory on the Champs-Élysées and confirmed his own overall victory in the process. Wiggins became the first, and is currently the only person in history to win the Paris–Nice, the Tour de Romandie, the Critérium du Dauphiné and the Tour de France in a single season.

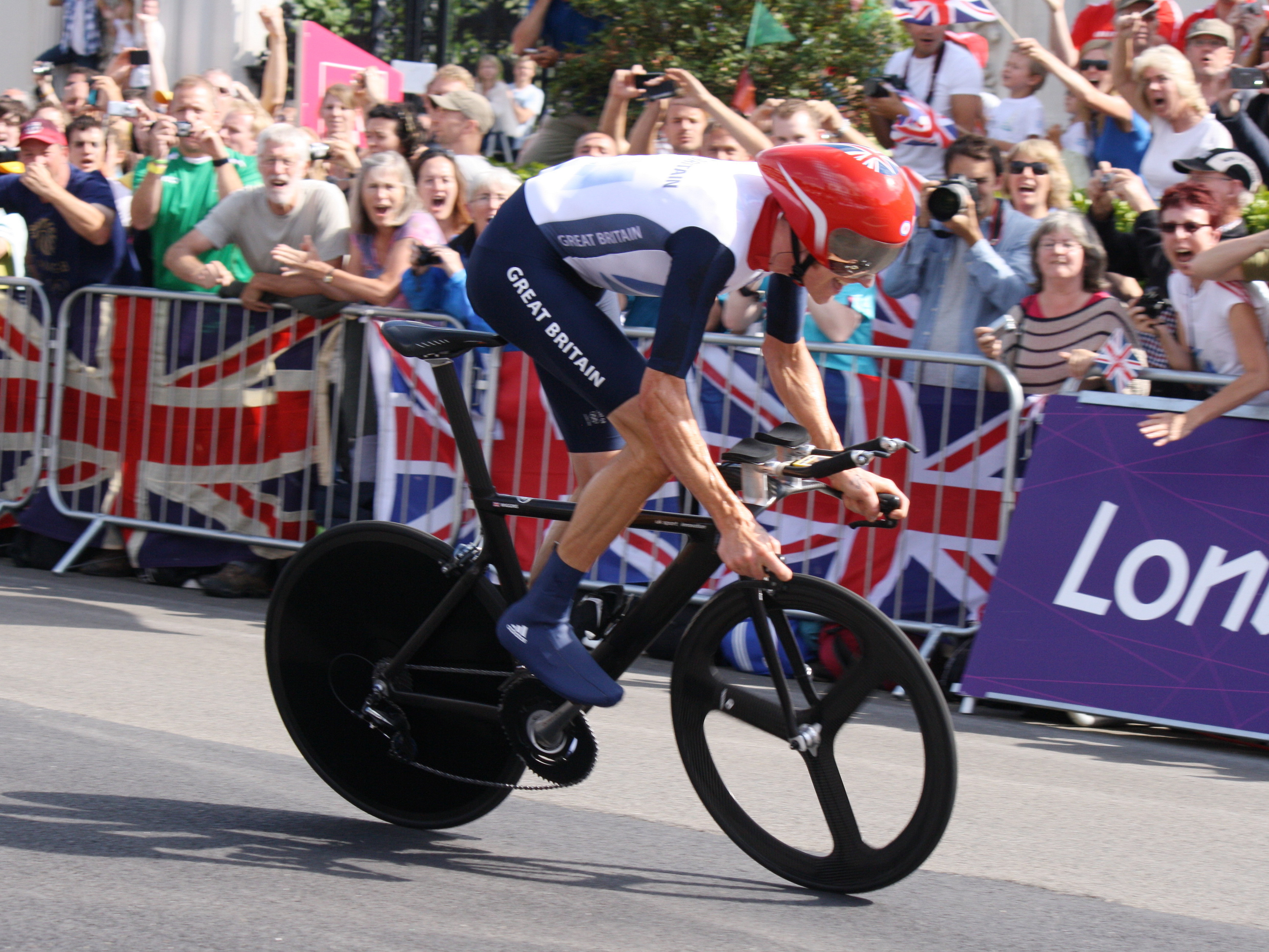
Wiggins won gold in the time trial at the 2012 Summer Olympics, becoming Great Britain's most decorated Olympian with seven medals – four of them gold.

Wiggins was selected to participate in two road cycling events at the 2012 Summer Olympics in London – the time trial and the road race. Wiggins finished 103rd in the road race. Wiggins won gold in the time trial ahead of Martin of Germany and Froome of Britain. By doing so he became the most decorated British Olympian, with seven medals, surpassing the six won by Sir Steve Redgrave. This record was soon shared with Sir Chris Hoy, who also obtained his seventh Olympic medal in 2012. Wiggins entered the Guinness World Records, becoming the first cyclist to win an Olympic gold medal and the Tour de France in the same year. Wiggins's boyhood idol Miguel Induráin won five consecutive Tours between 1991 and 1995, and won a gold medal at the 1996 Olympics in Atlanta.

Wiggins returned to racing at the Tour of Britain in September, pulling out on the sixth stage with a stomach bug. The road race at the road world championships in Limburg, Netherlands, was his last of the season. In October he was awarded the prestigious Vélo d'Or trophy in recognition of his achievements in 2012. In November he was involved in a road accident and taken to hospital with suspected broken ribs, but was released next day with only minor injuries. In December he won the BBC Sports Personality of the Year Award with 492,064 (30.25%) of the votes cast. Wiggins was knighted in the 2013 New Years Honours for services to cycling, although he claimed he would use the title for 'comedy purposes', stating that he felt "a little bit inferior" to others receiving knighthoods saying "I've won a bike race, you know, and I feel a little bit inferior to everyone", saying "I was just talking to some of the other people getting stuff, and asking them what they've been honoured for, and they're historic things, ground-breaking sciences or whatever". He was among the nominees for the Laureus World Sports Award for Sportsman of the Year, with Jamaican athlete Usain Bolt taking the prize.

=== 2013: Giro d'Italia and Tour of Britain ===
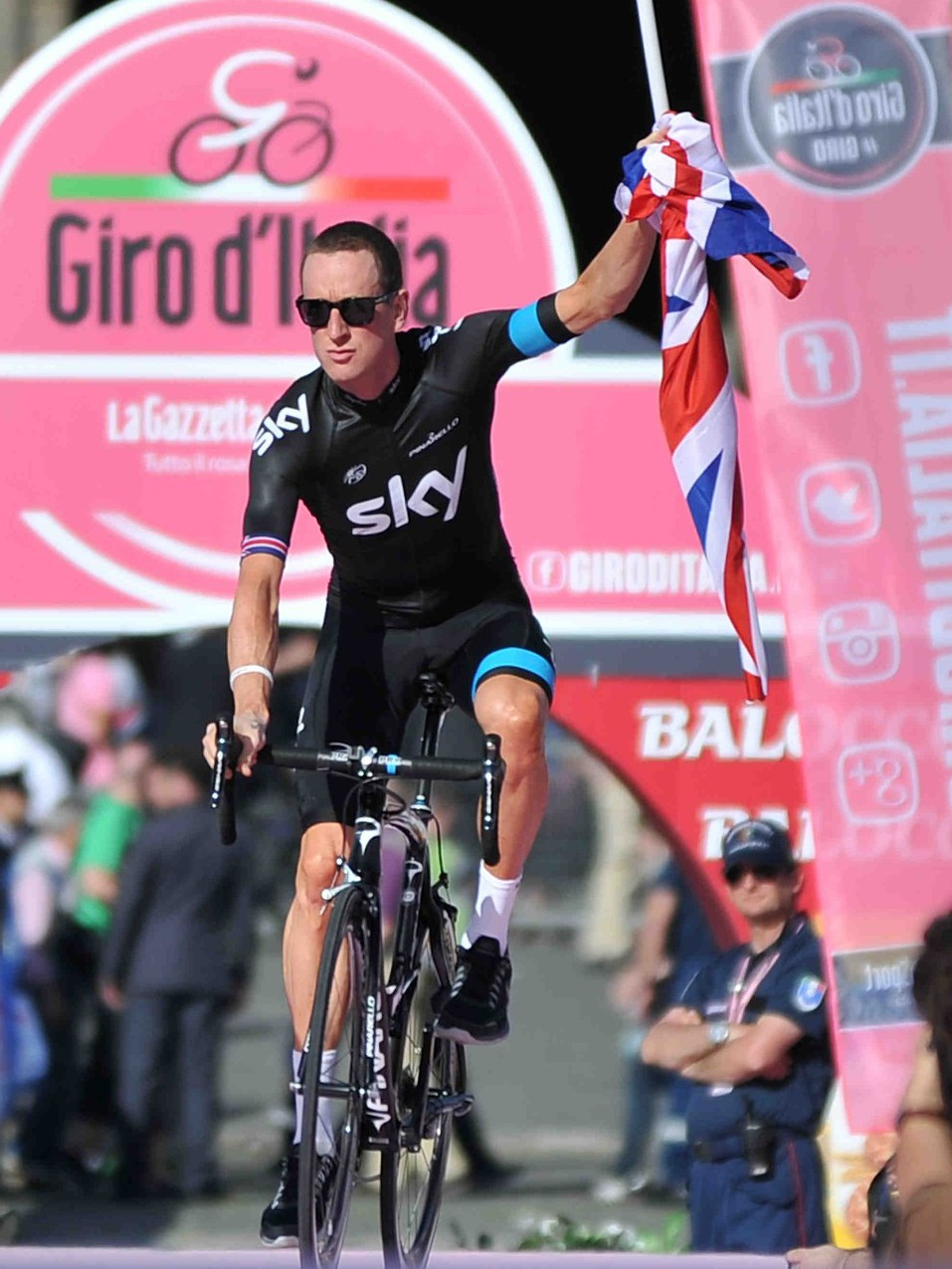
Wiggins at the 2013 Giro d'Italia team's presentation

It was widely expected that Wiggins would ride to retain his Tour de France title in 2013. However, in February he asserted that his focus for the season would be the Giro d'Italia, after which he would ride the Tour de France in support of teammate Froome. In April he let it be known that he desired to win another Tour, and had hopes of achieving the Tour and Giro double – a feat that has not been achieved since Marco Pantani in 1998.

Wiggins participated in a winter training camp in Mallorca. His first race of the season was the Tour of Oman in February. On the first stage he was caught behind a crash, the time delay pushing him back to the back of the field. For the remainder of the race Wiggins helped Froome, who won the overall classification. Wiggins opted not to defend his title at the Paris–Nice, or ride the Tirreno–Adriatico, instead participating in a training camp on Mount Teide in Tenerife. He returned to action at the Volta a Catalunya in March, finishing the race in fifth place overall, 54 seconds behind winner Dan Martin of Garmin–Sharp.

In April, Wiggins rode the four-day Giro del Trentino in Northern Italy as preparation for the Giro d'Italia. The first day's race schedule consisted of a road race followed by a team time trial. An unexpected breakaway in the road race caused Wiggins to lose over six minutes. However, he led the team to victory later in the day during the team time trial. On stage two, he cut his deficit to race leader Maxime Bouet of Ag2r–La Mondiale in half, lifting Wiggins into the top-five overall. On the fourth and final stage, Wiggins suffered a mechanical problem at the foot of the final 14.6 km (9.1 mi) climb. He ended up finishing the race in fifth place, one minute and 40 seconds down on winner Nibali (Astana).

Wiggins entered the Giro d'Italia as one of the favourites for the general classification. Team Sky won the stage two team time trial on the island of Ischia, covering the distance of 17.4 km (10.8 mi) 14 seconds quicker than Nibali's Astana squad. On stage four, Wiggins lost 17 seconds after being delayed by a crash within the final 3 km (1.9 mi), dropping him in the standings from second to sixth. A wet stage seven saw Wiggins crash while making a descent some 6 km (3.7 mi) from the finish, placing him in difficulty. Teammates Rigoberto Urán and Sergio Henao helped pace him back toward the leaders, but could not close the gap. Wiggins finished 90 seconds down on the race favourites, dropping him out of the race's top 20. In the following stage, a 54.8 km (34.1 mi) time trial, Wiggins placed second to compatriot Alex Dowsett of Movistar Team. A bike change compelled by a puncture cost Wiggins some time, and he ended up finishing the race ten seconds down on Dowsett. Wiggins struggled on the wet roads of stage nine, losing touch with the peloton on the descent of the Vallombrosa some 60 km (37.3 mi) from the finish. A group of teammates helped pace him back, and the gap was closed. Following stage 11 Wiggins revealed that he was suffering from a chest infection. He withdrew from the race the following day, after losing over three minutes on the day's stage.

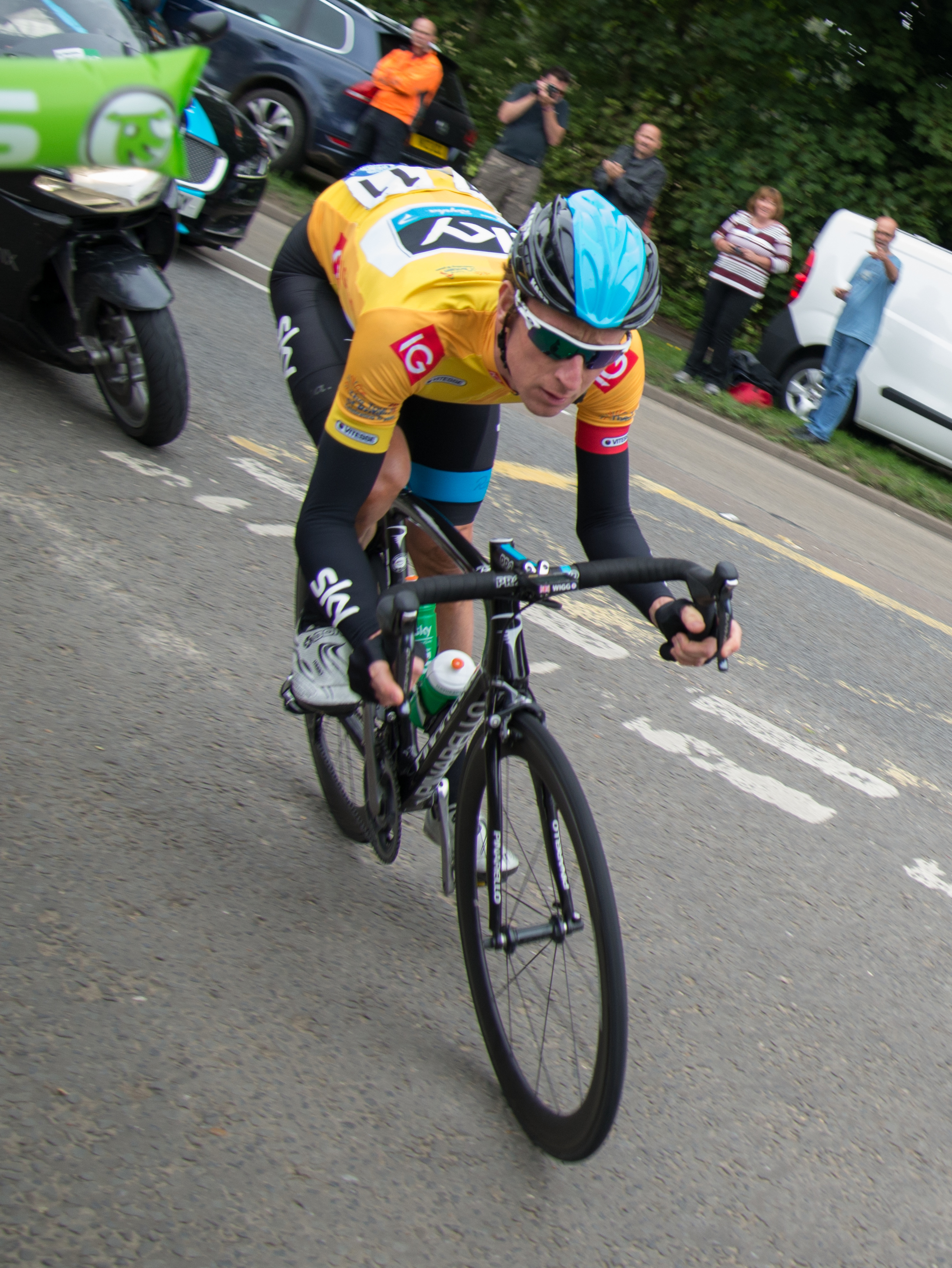
Wiggins wearing the leader's jersey at the 2013 Tour of Britain

The presence of a knee injury was disclosed to the public on 31 May, which forced Wiggins to forgo defending his title in the Tour de France. He subsequently suggested he may never ride the Tour again. He returned to racing at the Tour de Pologne, winning stage seven's 37 km (23.0 mi) time trial, 56 seconds ahead of second placed Cancellara.

In September, Wiggins led Team Sky at his home race, the Tour of Britain. He won the time trial on stage three on roads around Knowsley Safari Park, close to his home in Lancashire. He held the lead for the rest of the week to win the race for the first time, and take his first stage race victory of the season. The following week at the world championships, he took the silver medal in the time trial, behind winner Tony Martin and ahead of Cancellara in a repeat of the 2011 podium. Wiggins was also selected to ride the road race, but abandoned after one lap, and was soon followed by the other British riders as none finished the race.

=== 2014: World time trial champion and track return ===
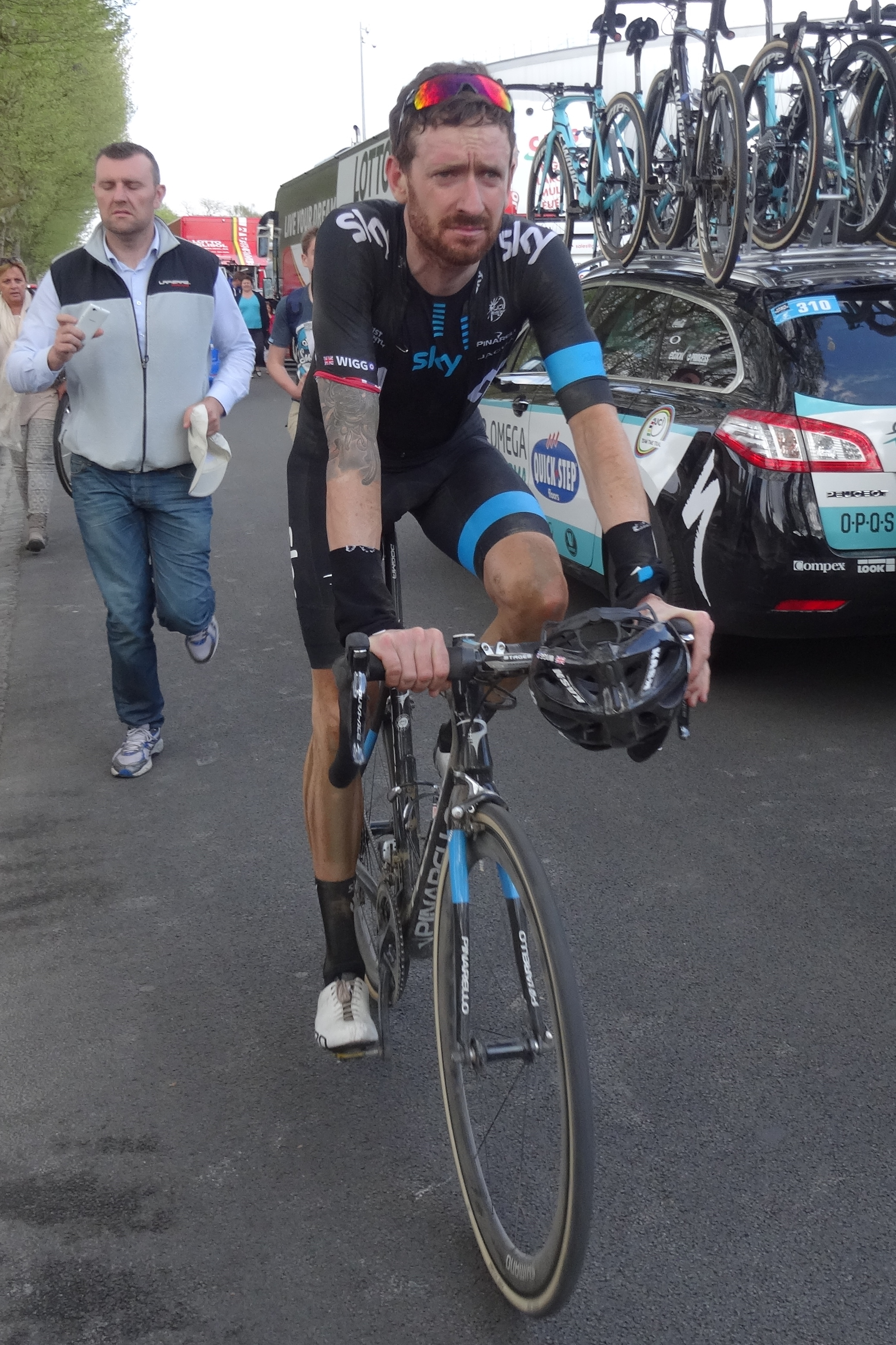
Wiggins after the 2014 Paris–Roubaix, where he placed ninth

Wiggins had stated that his main targets for 2014 were the Paris–Roubaix one day Classic, the Tour of California and the road world championships, as well as riding the Tour de France in support of Chris Froome.

Wiggins rode the Tour of Flanders as a replacement for the injured Ian Stannard, and finished 32nd, one minute 43 seconds behind the winner Fabian Cancellara, having helped Geraint Thomas on his way to eighth. Wiggins contested Paris–Roubaix for the first time since 2011, becoming the first former Tour de France winner to compete at the race since Greg LeMond in 1992, and secured ninth position, his only top ten finish in a monument as part of a group twenty seconds down on race winner Niki Terpstra.

At the Tour of California, Wiggins won the time trial on stage two by a margin of 40 seconds over second placed Rohan Dennis (Garmin–Sharp) to move into the overall lead which he would keep for the rest of the race. Despite that good result, Wiggins was not selected by his team to be riding the Tour de France, prompting his return to the track cycling team as preparation for the Commonwealth Games in Glasgow.

At the Commonwealth Games in July, Wiggins participated in the 4000m team pursuit with Steven Burke, Ed Clancy and Andy Tennant, managing to win the silver medal. The following day, Wiggins announced that he was "done with the road" and that he would likely never ride a grand tour again. He did not rule out some road events but wants to concentrate his training on preparation for the team pursuit at the 2016 Summer Olympics.

In September, Wiggins rode the Tour of Britain, winning the final 8.8 km (5.5 mi) time trial in London and ending the race in third overall behind the winner, Garmin–Sharp's Dylan van Baarle, and Michał Kwiatkowski (Omega Pharma–Quick-Step). Wiggins then won gold in the time trial at the world road championships in Ponferrada, Spain, with a winning margin of 26 seconds over Tony Martin over the 47.1 km (29.3 mi) course.

=== 2015: Paris–Roubaix, WIGGINS and hour record ===
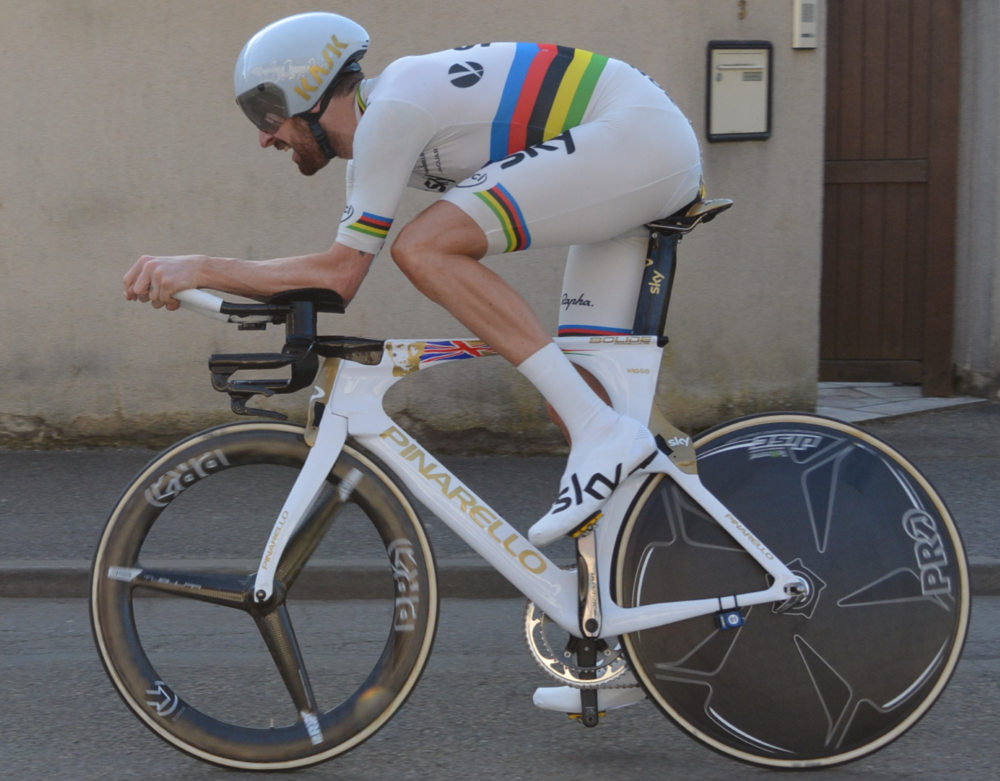
Wiggins in the world champions rainbow skinsuit at the 2015 Paris–Nice

In January 2015, it was confirmed that Wiggins had signed a contract extension with Team Sky to the end of April 2015, with a focus on attempting to win Paris–Roubaix, before transferring to his newly founded WIGGINS team in order to prepare alongside other members of the British track endurance squad for the team pursuit at the 2016 Summer Olympics. It was also confirmed that he would attempt to break the hour record in 2015. In March, he confirmed that he would make his debut with his eponymous team at the inaugural Tour de Yorkshire at the start of May.

Early in the season, Wiggins rode the Tour of Qatar, in which he lost out on contention for the general classification after being caught out by a split in the peloton and then finished third in the race's individual time trial stage behind Cancellara and Niki Terpstra, his first opportunity to wear his rainbow skinsuit. Wiggins then took part in the traditional opening race of the classics season, Omloop Het Nieuwsblad, finishing 44th as his teammate Ian Stannard took victory.

Wiggins returned to Paris–Nice, a race he had won in 2012. The race opened and closed with time-trials; Wiggins finished 12th in the prologue, did not feature in the following five stages, often riding at the back of the peloton, and then withdrew before the traditional mountain time-trial up the Col d'Èze, a stage for which Wiggins holds the fastest ever time, a legacy of his 2012 victory there. Again, his teammate Richie Porte was victorious in the race.

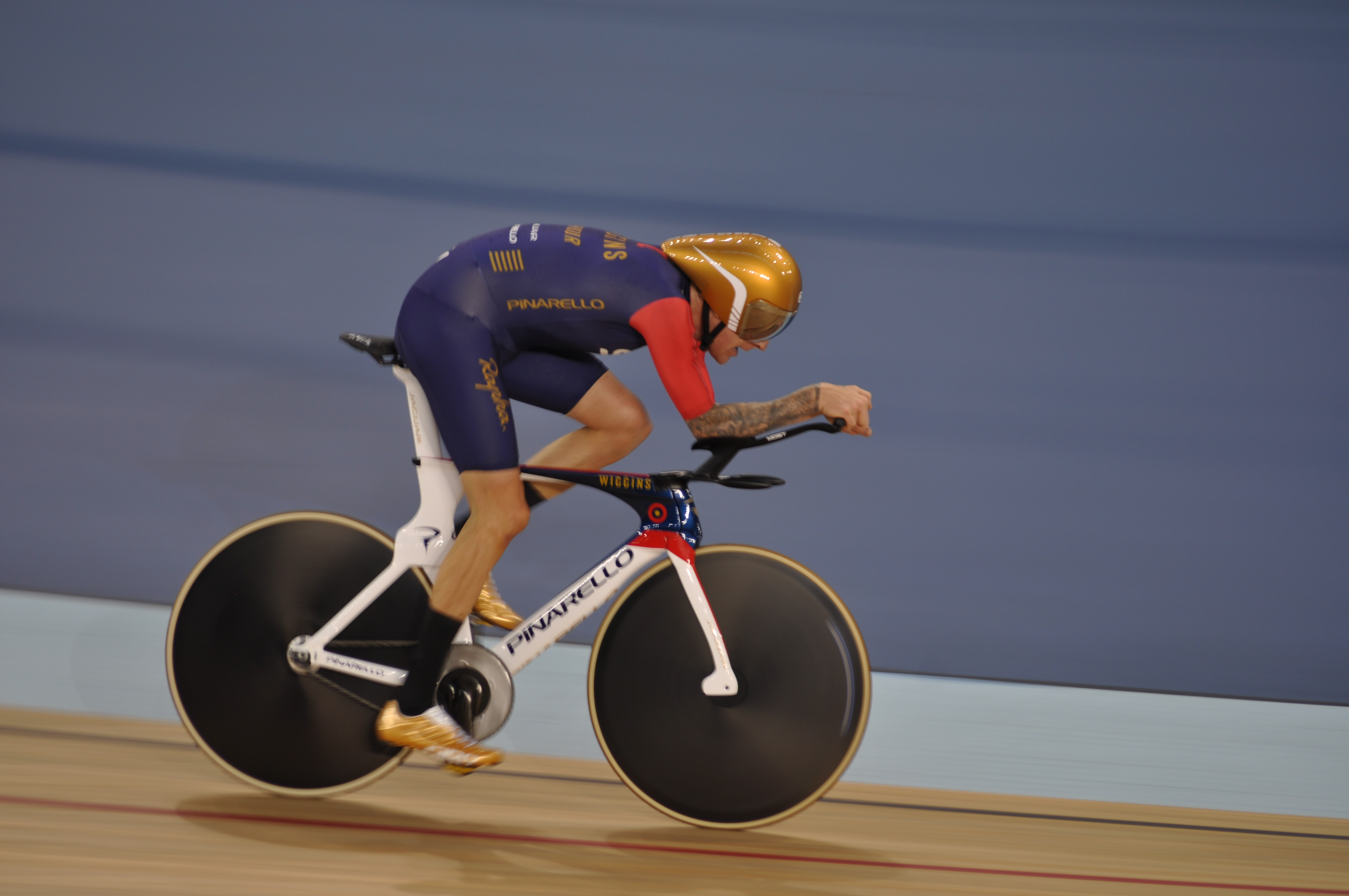
Wiggins during his successful hour record attempt on 7 June 2015

Wiggins was set to ride E3 Harelbeke in March, a return to the cobbled classics in the lead up to his main objective of Paris–Roubaix, but withdrew. Instead he rode Gent–Wevelgem two days later; however, he abandoned the race, which was hit by severe weather conditions with much heavy wind and rain, and only 39 riders finished the race. During the mid-week Three Days of De Panne, which began on 31 March, Wiggins acted as a lead-out man of Sky's sprinter, Elia Viviani, and then convincingly won the final stage's short time trial, expected to be his last in Sky colours, which also gave him 3rd place overall in the race.

At Paris–Roubaix, Wiggins's much publicised last race with Sky and primary goal of the early season, he finished in 18th position. He attacked with 30 km (18.6 mi) left to race, but was reabsorbed by the peloton. A few days after the race it was announced that Wiggins would make his bid to break the hour record on 7 June at Lee Valley VeloPark. He participated to the Tour de Yorkshire with WIGGINS Team, but did not register a significant result. A few weeks after leaving Team Sky, Wiggins said he felt "liberated" and "happier". On 7 June 2015, Wiggins broke the hour record, riding 54.526 km (33.881 mi), surpassing Dowsett's mark of 52.937 km (32.894 mi), set five weeks earlier, by more than 3%.

Roubaix, his first top-ten finish in a 'monument' classic, effectively marked the end of Wiggin's elite road career. That career was unusually brief by professional standard; his unexpectedly high finish in 2009 Tour de France led to his high-profile transfer to Team Sky for the following year, and a difficult first season. From 2011 through 2015, however, he had a remarkable run of successes including world and Olympic time trial titles, a Tour de France title and podium place in the Vuelta a Espana in 2011, and wins in almost all the major one week stage races between 2011 and 2013, including a Paris-Nice and two Criteriums du Dauphine, becoming the first man to win a treble of the Paris-Nice, the Dauphine and the Tour du Romandie, and the Tour de France in one season during his annus mirabilis in 2012. By 2014, however, he had already been eclipsed by his super -domestique Chris Froome in the Sky pecking order, incentivizing his return to the track in time for one last run at the Olympic Games and a fifth Olympic gold medal.

On 16 August, Wiggins joined Cavendish on the track for the first time since the 2008 Olympics, winning the Madison in the first round of the Revolution cycling series at the newly opened Derby Velodrome. In October, Wiggins took his first gold medal at the European track championships when he was part of the British squad that won the team pursuit.

=== 2016: Fifth Olympic gold and retirement ===
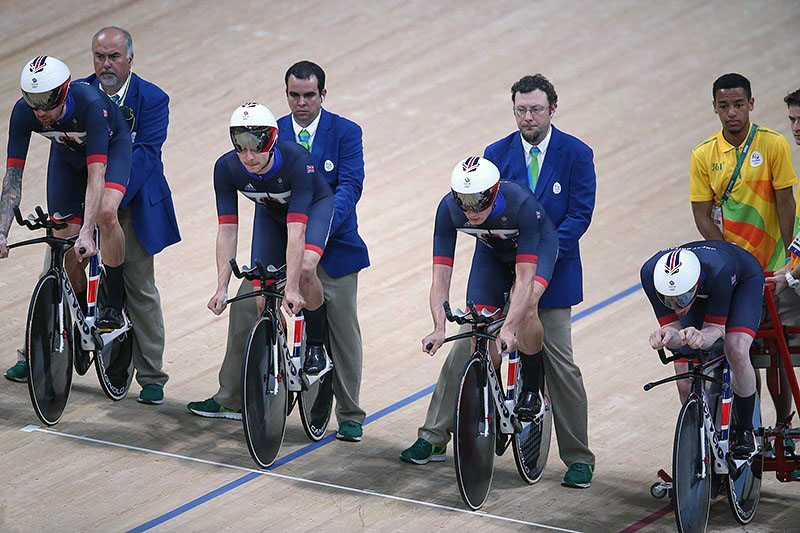
Wiggins (far left) with the British team pursuit squad at the 2016 Summer Olympics in Rio

Wiggins competed at the world championships in London, where he took two medals: in the team pursuit, he was part of the British squad that qualified for the final, where they took the silver behind Australia despite leading with 500 metres to go and going on to set the fastest time in competition by a British quartet since 2012. However Wiggins said that he was happy with his performance, stating "that (was) the strongest I've been in a team pursuit, so there's a bit of life left in me yet, and I've got another four or five months to get a bit better". Subsequently, he raced with Cavendish in the madison, where they clinched their second world title in the discipline as a pairing using similar tactics to their 2008 win: accumulating points in the sprints in the early stages of the race, before making up a one lap deficit on their French, Colombian and Swiss rivals by working with the Spanish pairing of Sebastián Mora and Albert Torres in a breakaway, taking the lead and holding on for the win despite Cavendish crashing with 11 laps to go.

Through the spring of 2016 Wiggins focused on training for the Olympics, limiting his road racing to a small number of events, finishing low down the placings in all of them. As part of a five-man squad for the team pursuit, Wiggins was reported to be breaking world records in Olympic training, despite apparent disagreements between Wiggins and Cavendish, who was nominated as the squad's fifth rider in order to allow him to enter the omnium at the games. The team pursuit squad achieved the fastest time in qualification for the tournament, before reaching the final with a world record time in a victory against New Zealand. In the final, Great Britain defeated Australia to bring Wiggins his eighth Olympic medal, and his fifth gold. Subsequently, Wiggins announced his plan to retire after the Six Days of Ghent in November. He plans to expand his activities in supporting and running Team Wiggins, including an aim to create a women's team. In his penultimate racing event, the Six Days of London, Wiggins placed second overall with Cavendish, before the pair won his final event, the Six Days of Ghent. After the event, Wiggins confirmed that this had been his last race as a team with Cavendish, but that he may go back on his decision to retire, in the right circumstances. However, on 28 December 2016, he announced that he was retiring from professional cycling saying "2016 is the end of the road for this chapter, onwards and upwards, 'feet on the ground, head in the clouds' kids from Kilburn don't win Olympic Golds and Tour de Frances! They do now."

== Controversy around therapeutic use exemptions ==
The leaking of his personal medical history by a group of hackers called Fancy Bear, in September 2016, raised questions about Wiggins's use of therapeutic use exemptions (TUEs), which allow athletes with certified medical conditions to take otherwise banned substances so as to allow them to compete with healthy athletes.

The leaked files show that he received six TUEs during his career for substances which are otherwise banned by WADA. In 2008, he was granted TUEs for salbutamol (which has since been legalised), formoterol and budesonide to treat asthma. Wiggins later received three intramuscular injections of the drug triamcinolone, a powerful corticosteroid. Triamcinolone is a banned substance because it allows riders to lose weight while maintaining power. The injections were administered to treat hayfever shortly before the 2011 and 2012 Tour de France races, and the 2013 Giro d'Italia.

Dr. Jeroen Swart, the South Africa-based exercise physiologist who oversaw Chris Froome's independent physiological testing, has suggested that the 2012 injection of triamcinolone ahead of Wiggins's historic Tour de France victory may have been administered as a preventive measure, rather than to treat existing symptoms, even though it is not a first-line therapy.

Whilst the use of banned performance-enhancing substances under TUEs is permitted by the sporting authorities provided the exemption was granted in terms of the WADA rules, questions have been raised about the in-competition use of such drugs. Dr Jeroen Swart questioned the choice of medication, the timing of the injections, the presence of disgraced doctor Geert Leinders on Wiggins's team at the time, and the fact that Wiggins said in his 2012 autobiography My Time that he had only ever received injections for immunisations and some drips.

Prentice Steffen, who was team doctor at Garmin–Slipstream when Wiggins rode for the team in 2009, said in a 2016 interview with the BBC that he was "surprised" that Wiggins was granted TUEs for the injection of triamcinolone immediately before three Grand Tours, that the decision by the team to apply for these TUEs was "questionable", and that he felt they should not have been granted. Wiggins has denied that Geert Leinders had any direct involvement in his taking of the TUE drugs.

=== Jiffy-bag scandal ===
UK Anti-Doping (UKAD), an independent body which is responsible for planning and implementing anti-doping programs in UK sport, began a 14-month investigation in 2016 into the contents of a padded mailing bag which was delivered to Team Sky at the 2011 Critérium du Dauphiné for Wiggins's use. In November 2017, it found that there was insufficient evidence to conclude that the bag had contained a banned substance. UKAD reached its conclusion because of insufficient and lost medical records within British Cycling and Team Sky.

The package was collected from British Cycling's office in Manchester by the British Cycling women's manager, Simon Cope, on the request of Shane Sutton, then the technical director for British Cycling. Cope carried the package on a flight to Geneva, after which he drove to meet Richard Freeman, the British Cycling doctor who administered the drug to Wiggins. Cope denied knowing what was in the package.

UKAD began its investigation in 2016 following a tip-off that the bag delivered to Wiggins contained the banned corticosteroid triamcinolone, which allows riders to lose weight while maintaining power. UKAD's investigation was hindered by Freeman, who was too ill to give evidence to the inquiry. Freeman had also failed to upload medical records as required, and later reported that his laptop had been stolen while on holiday. He had since resigned from British Cycling.

In December 2016, Sir Dave Brailsford, who ran British Cycling and Team Sky in 2011, informed the Digital, Culture, Media and Sport Select Committee that the package contained Fluimucil, a brand of legal expectorant, available over-the-counter at chemists in France without a prescription. Nigel Huddleston MP said it was "extraordinary" that a select committee was required for this simple fact to emerge, and he questioned "the transparency, communication and governance of UK cycling". The head of UKAD, Nicole Sapstead, had testified to parliament that there were no records of British Cycling purchasing Fluimucil in the UK. She told the MPs that British Cycling had however purchased significant amounts of triamcinolone, a corticosteroid generally banned in sport, which Wiggins is known to have used in other cases under a TUE.

UK Anti-Doping closed its investigation into the package after being unable to find evidence that it contained a banned substance. It released a statement which said that its investigation had been hampered by the lack of availability of detailed medical records. Parts of the investigation remain open, as UKAD has not yet been able to establish why products containing testosterone were delivered to the national cycling centre.

Damian Collins MP, the chairman of the select committee, said that the decision was "not an exoneration of anyone", and that "If Sky and British Cycling had kept proper medical records, this could have been wrapped up a lot sooner. It is unacceptable. A cloud now hangs over one of our greatest Olympians."

Wiggins has always denied any wrongdoing on his part, and has described the investigation as a "malicious witch-hunt".

The Digital, Culture, Media and Sport Committee made two major findings against Wiggins in a report released in March 2018. The committee believed Team Sky used the drug triamcinolone to "enhance the performances of riders and not just to treat medical need". The committee noted that there is no written evidence to substantiate a claim by Team Sky boss David Brailsford that the "jiffy-bag" contained Fluimucil. The committee stated that Team Sky doctor Richard Freeman, who had originally failed to record Wiggins's use of medical products, could no longer confirm that the contents of the bag were Fluimucil. It also noted that Freeman was "the only reported source of this information."

=== Report of the House of Commons Committee for Digital, Culture, Media and Sport ===
On 5 March 2018, the British House of Commons Digital, Culture, Media and Sport Committee published their report called "Combatting doping in sport". Their inquiry spanned the work of two committees, and started in August 2015. Among other things, the committee looked into doping in cycling, in response to the Fancy Bear hacking into the database of WADA and their publication of Therapeutic Use Exemption certificates (TUEs) issued to Bradley Wiggins in 2011, 2012 and 2013. They specifically inquired into the medication used at that time by Wiggins and Team Sky. In their conclusions, in paragraph 110, they state as follows:

From the evidence that has been received by the Committee regarding the use of triamcinolone at Team Sky during the period under investigation, and particularly in 2012, we believe that this powerful corticosteroid was being used to prepare Bradley Wiggins, and possibly other riders supporting him, for the Tour de France. The purpose of this was not to treat medical need, but to improve his power to weight ratio ahead of the race. The application for the TUE for the triamcinolone for Bradley Wiggins, ahead of the 2012 Tour de France, also meant that he benefited from the performance enhancing properties of this drug during the race. This does not constitute a violation of the WADA code, but it does cross the ethical line that David Brailsford says he himself drew for Team Sky. In this case, and contrary to the testimony of David Brailsford in front of the Committee, we believe that drugs were being used by Team Sky, within the WADA rules, to enhance the performance of riders, and not just to treat medical need.

The committee noted in its report that there is no written evidence to substantiate a claim by Team Sky boss David Brailsford that the "jiffy-bag" couriered to Team Sky at the 2011 Critérium du Dauphiné for Wiggins's use contained Fluimucil, a legal expectorant used for clearing mucus in case of chronic bronchitis, else as antidote in case of paracetamol overdose. The committee now says that Team Sky doctor Richard Freeman, who had failed to properly record Wiggins's use of medical products, can no longer confirm it was in fact Fluimucil. They also noted that Freeman was "the only reported source of this information."

The BBC called the report "A devastating blow to the reputations of some of the biggest names in British sport", and The Irish Times reported that Wiggins's Tour de France win is now in question. The Guardian wrote that: "It is only three months since we were last asking whether the latest crisis would signal the end for Team Sky. Now here we are again, wondering how much longer this organisation can continue when every scintilla of credibility they had as a completely clean team has been decimated by another inquiry."

Wiggins and Team Sky have continued to deny that any drugs were used without medical need.

== Personal life ==
=== Family ===
Wiggins was married to Catherine (née Cockram), whom he met during the 2002 Commonwealth Games, after first meeting as juniors in 1997; they have two children together, Ben and Isabella. Ben is also a racing cyclist, who has enjoyed success at the junior level, including winning the points race title at the 2022 European Track Championships and taking the silver medal in the time trial at the 2023 Road World Championships. Their family lived in Eccleston, Lancashire. In May 2020, it was announced that Wiggins and his wife had separated.

Bradley Wiggins endured a difficult relationship with his father Gary Wiggins, who made no effort to contact Bradley for 14 years, since leaving the family when Bradley was two years old. Bradley only knew his father had been a professional cyclist. Their first meeting was in 1999, when Bradley was at a training camp in Australia; also meeting his two half-sisters from relationships his father had in Australia before and after the one with his mother. They next met the following year, when Bradley was back in Australia training and had gone out three weeks in advance to stay with Gary. Bradley quickly became disillusioned at his father's alcohol and drug problems, and they never met again. Gary Wiggins died in Aberdeen, New South Wales in 2008, aged 55. Bradley did not attend the funeral.

=== Interests ===
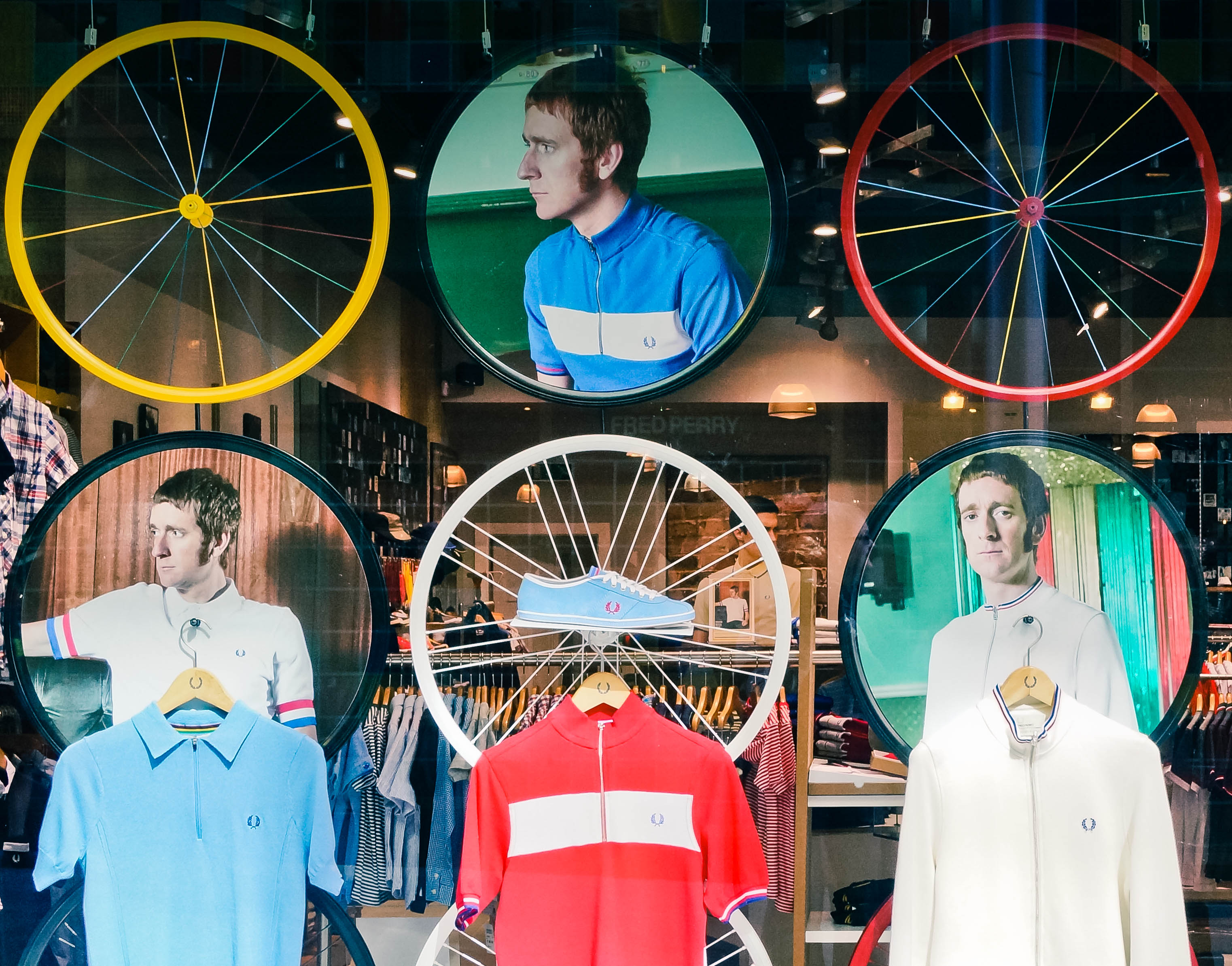
Wiggins has helped design a range of clothing with mod label Fred Perry.

Wiggins is a well-known mod and owns a collection of classic motor scooters and guitars from the 1960s and 1970s. He is a keen musician and guitarist and in December 2012, he made a surprise appearance at a Paul Weller charity concert, playing guitar on "That's Entertainment"; and together recorded a special for BBC Radio 6 Music discussing their love of music and mod culture, broadcast on Boxing Day. He supports Liverpool Football Club and Wigan Warriors rugby league club, and in 2012 the latter gave him a life membership, which he described as his highlight of the year. Wiggins presented the winner of the Super League's 2012 Man of Steel Award to the Warriors player Sam Tomkins.

In July 2012, it was announced that Wiggins would collaborate with the Fred Perry clothing label "to develop an authentic, non-technical range of cycle wear". The clothing range, known as the Bradley Wiggins X Fred Perry Collaboration, was launched in July 2012 under a six-year contract.

Also in 2012, Wiggins launched the Bradley Wiggins Foundation to draw people into sport and regular exercise. The foundation backed the professional women's team Wiggle–Honda, which launched for the 2013 season. However, in February 2015, Wiggins announced that the Foundation would be wound down in the run-up to the 2016 Olympics.

In August 2019, Wiggins announced his intention to become a social worker after enrolling for a degree at the Open University. He said that his upbringing, in Kilburn, London, gave him a "mental toughness" that would be helpful in supporting others. He also said that he doesn't "give a shit" about his cycling career and that he is "detached from it".

=== Personal and financial problems ===
In a period after the 2004 Olympics, Wiggins started to drink heavily as he struggled to cope with his newfound fame. He stopped when his son Ben was born.

In July 2020, the High Court in London dismissed a bankruptcy petition brought against Wiggins for unpaid tax by the HMRC, after Wiggins managed to make an agreement with HMRC representatives for payment of tax. In October 2020, it was reported that Wiggins had wound up his cycling team, Team Wiggins, with £1m-plus debts. Wiggins had invested a considerable amount of his personal wealth into the enterprise, but it proved unsustainable due to the lack of commercial partners. Although it was reported at the time that the winding up of Wiggins' cycling firms did not affect Wiggins' personal solvency, Wiggins' financial troubles started to attract media attention in the coming years.

In November 2023, it was reported that Wiggins was at risk of facing bankruptcy proceedings as the liquidators of his company revealed that a claim against him for nearly £1m has still not been paid. It later emerged that Wiggins had entered into an individual voluntary arrangement in 2020, to try to avoid bankruptcy. In January 2024, Wiggins failed his IVA, and bankruptcy proceedings were initiated against him.

Wiggins was declared bankrupt at Lancaster County Court on 3 June; Wiggins was reported to be 'homeless' and sleeping at various addresses, including his ex-wife's house. It was reported that Wiggins' dire financial situation may force him to sell his Olympic medals. Wiggins himself was reported to be 'embarrassed' by his financial predicament, and its becoming public. He revealed in 2025 that following his retirement from cycling, he had developed a cocaine addiction.

=== Other ===
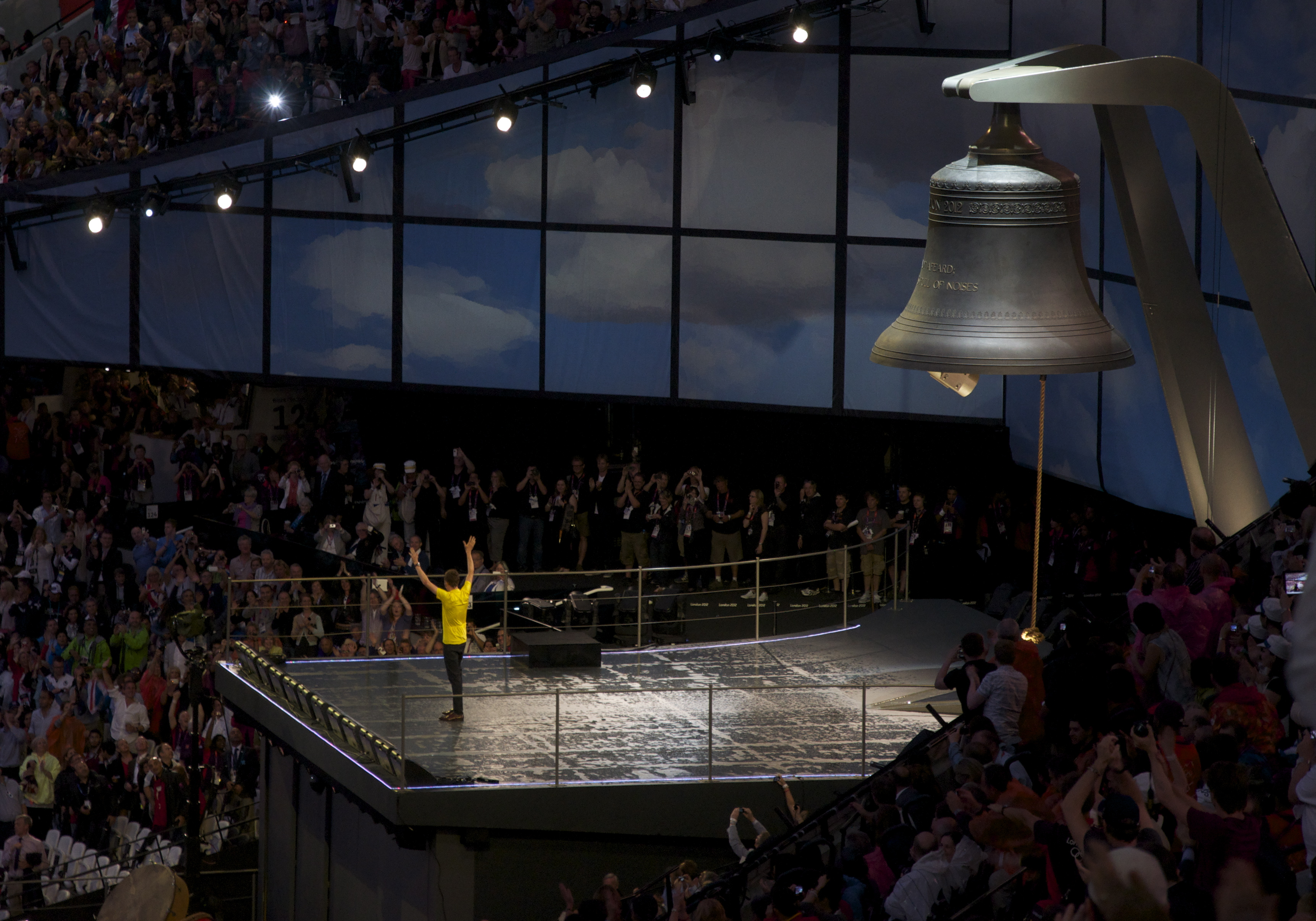
Wiggins rang the Olympic Bell to mark the start of the 2012 Summer Olympics opening ceremony.

At the 2012 Olympics, Wiggins rang the Olympic Bell to mark the start of the opening ceremony inside the Olympic Stadium.

Wiggins has written a number of books about his career. The first, entitled In Pursuit of Glory, was published in 2008 and covers his success as a track cyclist up to the Beijing Olympics. It was updated in 2009 to include his 2009 Tour de France fourth place (later updated to third). On Tour was published in 2010 and covers that year's Tour de France. Following his success at the 2012 Tour de France he published The Bradley Wiggins Opus. That same year he also published My Time which largely deals with the 2012 Tour de France and Olympics. My Story was published in 2013 and is an edited version of My Time for younger readers. In 2015, he added My Hour which tells of his successful attempt at the Hour record. In 2018, he added a seventh book, Icons, which details some of the riders who inspired him.

Wiggins's power output has been measured to be over 450 watts at anaerobic threshold.

In March 2014, Wiggins made an appearance as himself in an episode of BBC Radio 4's soap opera The Archers as part of the Sport Relief charitable appeal. Two years later he appeared in a comedy sketch filmed at the London Olympic Velodrome with Michael Crawford on Sport Relief 2016 where Crawford reprised his Some Mothers Do 'Ave 'Em character Frank Spencer.

A sculpture dedicated to and inspired by Wiggins was unveiled in 2014 at St Augustine's CE High School, his former school.

On 5 January 2017, it was announced that Wiggins would be a contestant on the Channel 4 winter sports reality television programme The Jump. However he was forced to withdraw from the show during the second week when he fractured his leg during training.

In June 2017, Wiggins revealed that he had taken up rowing on a serious basis after initially using it as a means to keep fit, with fellow Olympic champion James Cracknell as his coach. He stated that he was planning to compete in the British Indoor Rowing Championships in December of the same year with a view to competing at the 2020 Summer Olympics. He competed in the elite 2000m at the Championships, finishing 21st in a time of 6:22.5 after a slow start due to mistakenly believing that the race had false started.

In 2018, Wiggins launched The Bradley Wiggins Show, a cycle racing podcast produced in association with Eurosport, for a series of four episodes covering that year's Tour de France. The series received over a million downloads, and the show was renewed for a 20-episode run the following year, featuring discussion of the spring classics, Grand Tours and Road World Championships. He also took up punditry work for the channel in 2019, providing studio-based analysis for the Giro d'Italia before acting as a motorbike-mounted reporter for the Tour de France.

In July 2019, Comedy Central announced that it had approved the production of five episodes of Gods of the Game, a half-hour gameshow to be hosted by Wiggins featuring members of the public competing against elite sportspeople, including Mo Farah, Chris Hoy, Rebecca Adlington, Nicola Adams and Tim Henman, in "comedy versions" of their sports. Wiggins co-presented the programme with Tom Rosenthal. In a review of the show, Stuart Heritage of The Guardian wrote that "Gods of the Game is shooting for high-concept absurdity, but for the most part it falls short and only manages to be slightly diverting".

Wiggins said in an interview with Men's Health in 2022 that he had been groomed sexually by a cycling coach when he was 13. He said that he could not tell his stepfather about the abuse, because his stepfather was violent towards him. In May 2023, Wiggins revealed the name of the abuser.

== Career achievements ==
=== Major results ===
Sources:

=== Road ===
2000
7th Overall Circuit des Mines
2001
1st Overall Cinturón a Mallorca

1st Stages 1 (ITT) & 2

1st Overall Flèche du Sud

1st Stage 1

3rd Overall International Tour of Rhodes
9th Lincoln International GP
10th Overall Circuit des Mines
2003
1st Stage 1 (ITT) Tour de l'Avenir
5th Overall Tour du Poitou-Charentes
2005 (1 pro win)
1st Stage 8 Tour de l'Avenir
4th Overall Circuit de Lorraine

1st Stage 2 (ITT)

7th Time trial, UCI World Championships
7th LuK Challenge Chrono (with Christophe Moreau)
2007 (4)
1st Duo Normand (with Michiel Elijzen)
1st Prologue Critérium du Dauphiné Libéré
1st Stage 1 (ITT) Four Days of Dunkirk
1st Stage 4 (ITT) Tour du Poitou-Charentes
10th Time trial, UCI World Championships
Combativity award Stage 6 Tour de France
2009 (4)
1st Time trial, National Championships
1st Overall Herald Sun Tour

1st Stage 5 (ITT)

1st Beaumont Trophy
1st Stage 3b (ITT) Three Days of De Panne
1st Stage 1 (TTT) Tour of Qatar
3rd Overall Tour de France
2010 (2)
1st Time trial, National Championships
Giro d'Italia

1st Stage 1 (ITT)
Held after Stage 1

1st Stage 1 (TTT) Tour of Qatar
3rd Overall Vuelta a Murcia
2011 (3)
1st Road race, National Championships (Beaumont Trophy)
1st Overall Critérium du Dauphiné
1st Stage 4 (ITT) Bayern Rundfahrt
2nd Time trial, UCI World Championships
2nd Overall Vuelta a España

Held after Stages 11–15

3rd Overall Paris–Nice
9th UCI World Tour
2012 (12)
1st Time trial, Olympic Games
1st Overall Tour de France

1st Stages 9 (ITT) & 19 (ITT)

1st Overall Paris–Nice

1st Points classification
1st Stage 8 (ITT)

1st Overall Tour de Romandie

1st Stages 1 & 5 (ITT)

1st Overall Critérium du Dauphiné

1st Stage 4 (ITT)

2nd UCI World Tour
3rd Overall Volta ao Algarve

1st Stage 5 (ITT)

2013 (3)
1st Overall Tour of Britain

1st Stage 3 (ITT)

1st Stage 7 (ITT) Tour de Pologne
1st Stage 2 (TTT) Giro d'Italia
2nd Time trial, UCI World Championships
5th Overall Giro del Trentino

1st Stage 1b (TTT)

5th Overall Volta a Catalunya
2014 (5)
1st Time trial, UCI World Championships
1st Time trial, National Championships
1st Overall Tour of California

1st Stage 2 (ITT)

3rd Overall Tour of Britain

1st Stage 8a (ITT)

9th Paris–Roubaix
2015 (1)
3rd Overall Three Days of De Panne

1st Stage 3b (ITT)

==== General classification results timeline ====
Grand Tour general classification results timeline
Grand Tour	2003	2004	2005	2006	2007	2008	2009	2010	2011	2012	2013	2014	2015
Giro d'Italia	DNF	—	123	—	—	134	69	40	—	—	DNF	—	—
Tour de France	—	—	—	121	DNF	—	3	23	DNF	1	—	—	—
/ Vuelta a España	—	—	—	—	—	—	—	—	2	—	—	—	—
Major stage race general classification results timeline
Race	2003	2004	2005	2006	2007	2008	2009	2010	2011	2012	2013	2014	2015
Paris–Nice	80	DNF	DNF	71	—	—	DNF	—	3	1	—	—	DNF
/ Tirreno–Adriatico	—	—	—	—	—	—	—	—	—	—	—	53	—
Volta a Catalunya	—	—	—	—	138	—	—	—	—	DNF	5	—	—
Tour of the Basque Country	—	—	—	—	—	—	—	33	—	—	—	—	—
Tour de Romandie	DNF	—	—	—	—	105	—	—	62	1	—	—	—
Critérium du Dauphiné	—	—	—	85	95	—	—	—	1	1	—	—	—
Tour de Suisse	—	99	—	—	—	—	—	—	—	—	—	DNF	—

==== Monuments results timeline ====
Monument	2002	2003	2004	2005	2006	2007	2008	2009	2010	2011	2012	2013	2014	2015
Milan–San Remo	—	98	—	88	46	—	—	108	—	44	—	—	—	—
Tour of Flanders	DNF	50	DNF	81	DNF	—	—	—	—	—	—	—	32	87
Paris–Roubaix	—	DNF	DNF	DNF	49	—	—	25	—	90	—	—	9	18
Liège–Bastogne–Liège	—	—	—	—	—	—	—	—	71	—	—	—	—	—
Giro di Lombardia	—	—	—	—	—	—	—	—	DNF	—	—	—	—	—

=== Track ===
1998
1st Individual pursuit, UCI World Junior Championships
National Junior Championships

1st Points race
1st Scratch

2nd Team pursuit, Commonwealth Games
1999
1st Madison, National Championships (with Rob Hayles)
2000
2nd Team pursuit, UCI World Championships
3rd Team pursuit, Olympic Games
3rd Six Days of Grenoble (with Rob Hayles)
2001
1st Individual pursuit, UEC European Under-23 Championships
2nd Team pursuit, UCI World Championships
2002
Commonwealth Games

2nd Individual pursuit
2nd Team pursuit

2nd Six Days of Ghent (with Matthew Gilmore)
3rd Team pursuit, UCI World Championships
2003
UCI World Championships

1st Individual pursuit
2nd Team pursuit

1st Six Days of Ghent (with Matthew Gilmore)
2004
Olympic Games

1st Individual pursuit
2nd Team pursuit
3rd Madison (with Rob Hayles)

2007
UCI World Championships

1st Individual pursuit
1st Team pursuit

UCI World Cup Classics

1st Individual pursuit, Manchester
1st Team pursuit, Manchester
1st Team pursuit, Sydney
1st Individual pursuit, Beijing
2nd Madison, Beijing (with Mark Cavendish)

2008
Olympic Games

1st Individual pursuit
1st Team pursuit

UCI World Championships

1st Individual pursuit
1st Team pursuit
1st Madison (with Mark Cavendish)

2011
1st Team pursuit, UCI World Cup Classics, Manchester
2014
2nd Team pursuit, Commonwealth Games
2015
Hour record: 54.526 km
1st Team pursuit, UEC European Championships
Revolution Series, Derby

1st Team pursuit
1st Madison (with Mark Cavendish)

2016
1st Team pursuit, Olympic Games
UCI World Championships

1st Madison (with Mark Cavendish)
2nd Team pursuit

1st Six Days of Ghent (with Mark Cavendish)
2nd Six Days of London (with Mark Cavendish)

=== Major championships results timeline ===
Event		1999	2000	2001	2002	2003	2004	2005	2006	2007	2008	2009	2010	2011	2012	2013	2014	2015	2016
Olympic Games	Individual pursuit	NH	—	Not held			1	Not held			1	Not held			—	Not held			—
Olympic Games	Madison	NH	4	Not held			3	Not held			9	Not held			—	Not held			—
Olympic Games	Team pursuit	NH	3	Not held			2	Not held			1	Not held			—	Not held			1
Olympic Games	Road time trial	NH	—	Not held			—	Not held			—	Not held			1	Not held			—
Olympic Games	Road race	NH	—	Not held			—	Not held			—	Not held			103	Not held			—
World Championships	Individual pursuit	—	—	7	5	1	—	—	—	1	1	—	—	—	—	—	—	—	—
World Championships	Madison	10	—	—	—	—	—	—	—	—	1	—	—	—	—	—	—	—	1
World Championships	Team pursuit	5	2	2	3	2	—	—	—	1	1	—	—	—	—	—	—	—	2
World Championships	Road time trial	—	—	—	—	—	—	7	—	10	—	21	—	2	—	2	1	—	—
World Championships	Road race	—	—	—	—	—	—	112	—	—	—	—	—	108	DNF	DNF	—	—	—
National Championships	Time trial	—	7	—	—	—	—	—	—	—	—	1	1	—	—	—	1	—	—
National Championships	Road race	—	—	—	—	—	—	—	—	—	—	DNF	—	1	—	—	DNS	—	—

Legend
—	Did not compete
DNF	Did not finish
N/A	Race not held

=== World records ===
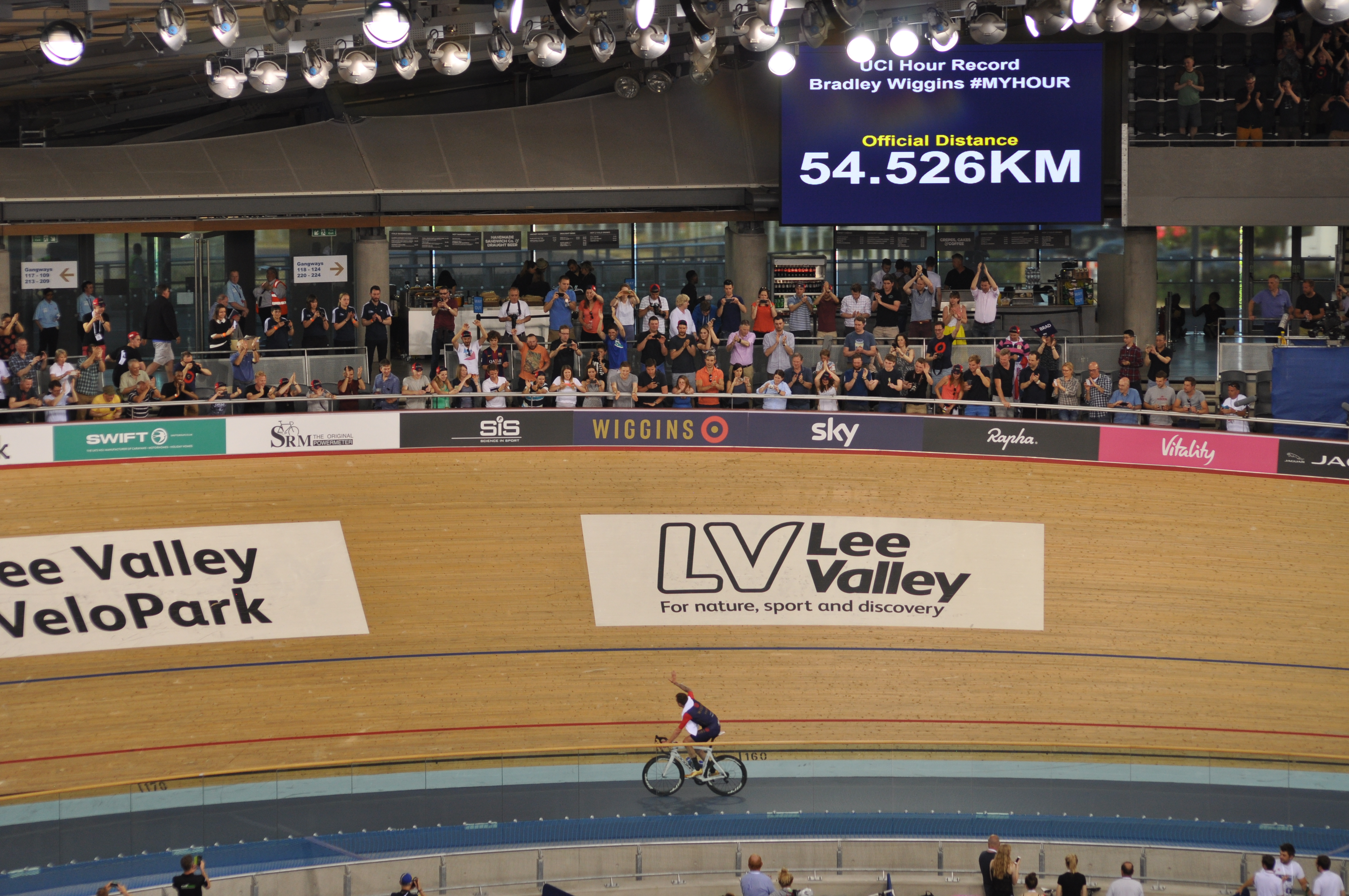
Wiggins celebrating his hour record of 54.526 km at London's Lee Valley VeloPark in June 2015

Discipline	Record	Date	Event	Velodrome	Ref
Team pursuit	3:56.322	27 March 2008	World Championships	Manchester	
Team pursuit	3:55.202	17 August 2008	Olympic Games	Laoshan (Beijing)	
Team pursuit	3:53.314	18 August 2008	Olympic Games	Laoshan (Beijing)	
Hour record	54.526 km	7 June 2015	—	Lee Valley (London)	
Team pursuit	3:50.570	12 August 2016	Olympic Games	Rio Olympic	
Team pursuit	3:50.265	12 August 2016	Olympic Games	Rio Olympic	

=== Awards and honours ===
- Cycling Weekly Cyclist of the Year: 2000
- Appointed Officer of the Order of the British Empire for services to sport: 2005 New Year Honours
- Appointed Commander of the Order of the British Empire for services to sport: 2009 New Year Honours
- London Youth Games Hall of Fame: 2010
- GQ Lifetime Achievement: 2012
- Vélo d'Or: 2012
- Sports Journalists' Association's Sportsman of the Year: 2012
- Cyclingnews.com Rider of the Year: 2012
- International Flandrien of the Year: 2012
- Bidlake Memorial Prize: 2012
- BBC Sports Personality of the Year: 2012
- Laureus World Sports Sportsman of the Year Award (nominated): 2013
- Appointed Knight Bachelor for services to cycling: 2013 New Year Honours

== See also ==
- 2012 Summer Olympics and Paralympics gold post boxes
- List of British cyclists
- List of British cyclists who have led the Tour de France general classification
- List of Grand Tour general classification winners
- List of multiple Olympic gold medalists at a single Games
- List of multiple Olympic gold medalists
- List of multiple Summer Olympic medalists
- List of Olympic medalists in cycling (men)
- List of people from Ghent
- List of sporting knights and dames
- World record progression track cycling – Men's team pursuit
- Yellow jersey statistics

== Sources ==
- Elrington, C. R. (1989). A History of the County of Middlesex: Volume IX: Hampstead and Paddington Parishes. Victoria County History. Woodbridge, Suffolk: Boydell & Brewer. ISBN 978-0-19-722772-5.
- Wiggins, Bradley (2012a). In Pursuit of Glory. London: Orion Publishing Group. ISBN 978-1-4091-2913-4.
- Wiggins, Bradley (2012b). Bradley Wiggins: My Time. London: Yellow Jersey Press. ISBN 978-1-4481-6139-3.

Preceded by Alex Dowsett	UCI hour record (54.526 km); 7 June 2015 – 16 April 2019	Succeeded by Victor Campenaerts
