= 2007 UCI Track Cycling World Championships – Men's individual pursuit =

Men's individual pursuit at the 2007 UCI Track Cycling World Championships
- Venue: Palma Arena
- Location: Palma de Mallorca, Spain
- Dates: 29 March 2007

Medalists
gold medal	Bradley Wiggins	Great Britain
silver medal	Robert Bartko	Germany
bronze medal	Sergi Escobar Roure	Spain

The Men's Individual Pursuit was one of the 10 men's events at the 2007 UCI Track World Championships, held in Palma de Mallorca, Spain on March 29.

Twenty-two cyclists from 14 countries participated in the contest. After the qualification, the two fastest riders advance to the final and the 3rd- and 4th-best results would race for the bronze medal.

The qualification took place on March 29 at 10:45 a.m. and the finals on the same day at 8:05 p.m.

== World record ==
World Record
WR	4:11.114	Chris Boardman (GBR)	Manchester (United Kingdom)	August 29, 1996

== Qualifying ==
Rank	Name	1000m	2000m	3000m	Time	Speed (km/h)	Q
Rank	Name	1000m	1000-2000	2000-3000	3000-4000	Speed (km/h)	Q
1	Bradley Wiggins (GBR)	1:08.994 (5)	2:11.340 (2)	3:13.553 (1)	4:15.976	56.255	QF
1	Bradley Wiggins (GBR)		1:02.346 (1)	1:02.213 (1)	1:02.423 (1)		
2	Robert Bartko (GER)	1:08.283 (1)	2:12.647 (3)	3:17.029 (3)	4:20.487	55.281	QF
2	Robert Bartko (GER)		1:04.364 (7)	1:04.382 (5)	1:03.458 (2)		
3	Sergi Escobar (ESP)	1:08.348 (2)	2:10.834 (1)	3:14.370 (2)	4:20.501	55.278	QB
3	Sergi Escobar (ESP)		1:02.486 (2)	1:03.536 (2)	1:06.131 (8)		
4	Antonio Tauler Llull (ESP)	1:10.034 (12)	2:14.184 (7)	3:18.273 (4)	4:22.795	54.795	QB
4	Antonio Tauler Llull (ESP)		1:04.150 (5)	1:04.089 (4)	1:04.522 (4)		
5	Jenning Huizenga (NED)	1:10.911 (17)	2:16.172 (15)	3:21.073 (10)	4:25.020	54.335	
5	Jenning Huizenga (NED)		1:05.261 (11)	1:04.901 (6)	1:03.947 (3)		
6	Jens Mouris (NED)	1:10.322 (16)	2:14.331 (9)	3:18.278 (5)	4:25.094	54.320	
6	Jens Mouris (NED)		1:04.009 (4)	1:03.947 (3)	1:06.816 (10)		
7	Robert Hayles (GBR)	1:08.969 (4)	2:13.659 (5)	3:18.740 (6)	4:25.669	54.202	
7	Robert Hayles (GBR)		1:04.690 (8)	1:05.081 (7)	1:06.929 (11)		
8	Mark Jamieson (AUS)	1:08.786 (3)	2:14.885 (11)	3:21.228 (11)	4:26.595	54.014	
8	Mark Jamieson (AUS)		1:06.099 (15)	1:06.343 (11)	1:05.367 (6)		
9	Alexander Serov (RUS)	1:10.138 (13)	2:14.328 (8)	3:21.040 (9)	4:27.222	53.887	
9	Alexander Serov (RUS)		1:04.190 (6)	1:06.712 (15)	1:06.182 (9)		
10	Fabien Sanchez (FRA)	1:10.259 (15)	2:16.374 (16)	3:22.349 (15)	4:27.614	53.808	
10	Fabien Sanchez (FRA)		1:06.115 (16)	1:05.975 (10)	1:05.265 (5)		
11	Daniel Becke (GER)	1:06.012 (6)	2:14.110 (6)	3:20.075 (8)	4:27.622	53.807	
11	Daniel Becke (GER)		1:05.098 (9)	1:05.965 (9)	1:07.547 (14)		
12	Volodymyr Dyudya (UKR)	1:09.307 (7)	2:12.987 (4)	3:19.588 (7)	4:28.919	53.547	
12	Volodymyr Dyudya (UKR)		1:03.680 (3)	1:06.601 (14)	1:09.331 (17)		
13	Dominique Cornu (BEL)	1:11.640 (19)	2:18.108 (19)	3:23.475 (17)	4:29.093	53.513	
13	Dominique Cornu (BEL)		1:06.468 (18)	1:05.367 (8)	1:05.618 (7)		
14	Vitaly Popkov (UKR)	1:09.468 (8)	2:14.643 (10)	3:21.670 (12)	4:29.175	53.496	
14	Vitaly Popkov (UKR)		1:05.175 (10)	1:07.027 (18)	1:07.505 (13)		
15	Carlos Alzate (COL)	1:10.184 (14)	2:15.464 (12)	3:22.059 (13)	4:29.256	53.480	
15	Carlos Alzate (COL)		1:05.280 (12)	1:06.595 (13)	1:07.197 (12)		
16	Zakkari Dempster (AUS)	1:10.004 (11)	2:15.647 (13)	3:22.092 (14)	4:30.125	53.308	
16	Zakkari Dempster (AUS)		1:05.643 (13)	1:06.445 (12)	1:08.033 (16)		
17	David O'Loughlin (IRL)	1:09.499 (9)	2:15.856 (14)	3:22.861 (16)	4:30.595	53.216	
17	David O'Loughlin (IRL)		1:06.357 (17)	1:07.005 (17)	1:07.734 (15)		
18	Zachary Bell (CAN)	1:12.083 (21)	2:18.822 (21)	3:25.614 (18)	4:34.956	52.372	
18	Zachary Bell (CAN)		1:06.739 (19)	1:06.792 (16)	1:09.342 (18)		
19	Giairo Ermeti (ITA)	1:11.279 (18)	2:17.364 (18)	3:25.958 (19)	4:35.572	52.254	
19	Giairo Ermeti (ITA)		1:06.085 (14)	1:08.594 (19)	1:09.614 (19)		
20	Valery Valynin (RUS)	1:11.702 (20)	2:18.718 (20)	3:27.972 (20)	4:38.360	51.731	
20	Valery Valynin (RUS)		1:07.016 (20)	1:098.254 (20)	1:10.388 (20)		
21	Sergejus Apionkinas (LTU)	1:09.521 (10)	2:17.342 (17)	3:28.898 (21)	4:40.908	51.262	
21	Sergejus Apionkinas (LTU)		1:07.821 (21)	1:11.556 (21)	1:12.010 (12)		

== Finals ==
Rank	Name	1000m	2000m	3000m	Time	Speed (km/h)
Rank	Name	1000m	1000-2000	2000-3000	3000-4000	Speed (km/h)
Gold Medal Race
	Bradley Wiggins (GBR)	1:09.013 (1)	2:12.029 (1)			
	Bradley Wiggins (GBR)		1:03.016 (1)			
	Robert Bartko (GER)	1:09.582 (2)	2:16.051 (2)		OVL	
	Robert Bartko (GER)		1:06.469 (2)			
Bronze Medal Race
	Sergi Escobar Roure (ESP)	1:09.270 (1)	2:12.755 (1)	3:16.747 (1)	4:23.417	54.666
	Sergi Escobar Roure (ESP)		1:03.485 (1)	1:03.992 (1)	1:06.670 (1)	
4	Antonio Tauler Llull (ESP)	1:09.971 (2)	2:14.963 (2)	3:21.424 (2)	4:29.536	53.425
4	Antonio Tauler Llull (ESP)		1:04.992 (2)	1:06.461 (2)	1:08.112 (2)	
