= Cycling at the 2004 Summer Olympics – Men's individual pursuit =

Cycling at the Olympics

Coordinates: 38°2′24.7″N 23°46′49.4″E

The men's individual pursuit event in cycling at the 2004 Summer Olympics consisted of matches between two cyclists. The riders would start at opposite ends of the track. Each had 16 laps (4 kilometres) in which to catch the other cyclist. If neither was caught before one had gone 16 laps, the times for the distance were used to determine the victor. In the thirteen matches of the 2004 event, no cyclist was lapped.

== Medalists ==
Gold	Silver	Bronze
Bradley Wiggins (GBR)	Brad McGee (AUS)	Sergi Escobar (ESP)

== Records ==
World Record	Christopher Boardman (GBR)	Manchester, United Kingdom	4:11.114	29 August 1996
Olympic Record	Robert Bartko (GER)	Sydney, Australia	4:18.515	17 September 2000

== Results ==
=== Qualifying round ===
20 August, 16:30

The sixteen riders raced against each other in matches of two. Qualification for the next round was not based on who won those matches, however. The cyclists with the eight fastest times advanced, regardless of whether they won or lost their match.

Heat	Name	Time	Rank
1	Yuriy Yuda (KAZ)	4:29.676	14
1	Hossein Askari (IRI)	4:39.302	15
2	Linas Balčiūnas (LTU)	4:22.392	9
2	Vasil Kiryienka (BLR)	4:29.005	13
3	Carlos Castaño (ESP)	4:27.871	12
3	Levi Heimans (NED)	DNS	—
4	Volodymyr Dyuda (UKR)	4:18.169 Q	5
4	Christian Lademann (GER)	4:26.760	11
5	Fabien Sanchez (FRA)	4:20.606 Q	8
5	Alexei Markov (RUS)	4:25.520	10
6	Bradley Wiggins (GBR)	4:15.165 Q	1
6	Luke Roberts (AUS)	4:19.353 Q	7
7	Rob Hayles (GBR)	4:17.930 Q	4
7	Robert Bartko (GER)	4:18.991 Q	6
8	Sergi Escobar (ESP)	4:16.862 Q	2
8	Brad McGee (AUS)	4:17.510 Q	3

=== Match round ===
In the first round of actual match competition, cyclists were seeded into matches based on their times from the qualifying round. The fastest cyclist faced the eighth-fastest, the second-fastest faced the third, and so forth. Winners advanced to the finals while losers in each match received a final ranking based on their time in the round.

Heat 1

Rob Hayles (GBR)	4:19.559 Q	(3rd)
Volodymyr Dyuda (UKR)	4:22.720	(7th)

Heat 2

Brad McGee (AUS)	4:17.978 Q	(2nd)
Robert Bartko (GER)	4:26.184	(8th)

Heat 3

Sergi Escobar (ESP)	4:19.581 Q	(4th)
Luke Roberts (AUS)	4:20.336	(5th)

Heat 4

Bradley Wiggins (GBR)	4:17.215 Q	(1st)
Fabien Sanchez (FRA)	4:21.235	(6th)

=== Medal round ===
Cyclists were again re-seeded, this time based on their times in the match round. The third- and fourth-fastest riders faced off in the bronze medal match, while the fastest two riders competed for the gold and silver medals.

Bronze medal match

Sergi Escobar (ESP)	4:17.947
Rob Hayles (GBR)	4:22.291

Gold medal match

In a reversal of the 2002 Commonwealth Games final, where McGee had caught Wiggins before the end, the Brit took the title to make up for the disappointment of his teammate losing the bronze medal match.

Bradley Wiggins (GBR)	4:16.304
Brad McGee (AUS)	4:20.436

== Final classification ==
The final results were

1. Bradley Wiggins (GBR)
2. Brad McGee (AUS)
3. Sergi Escobar (ESP)
4. Rob Hayles (GBR)
5. Luke Roberts (AUS)
6. Fabien Sanchez (FRA)
7. Volodymyr Dyuda (UKR)
8. Robert Bartko (GER)
9. Linas Balčiūnas (LTU)
10. Alexei Markov (RUS)
11. Christian Lademann (GER)
12. Carlos Castaño (ESP)
13. Vasil Kiryienka (BLR)
14. Yuriy Yuda (KAZ)
15. Hossein Askari (IRI)

Did not start: Levi Heimans (NED)
