= Sergi Escobar (cyclist) =

Spanish cyclist

Personal information
- Full name: Sergi Escobar Roure
- Born: 22 September 1974 (age 52) Lleida, Spain

Cycling career
- Sport: Cycling
- Disciplines: Track, Road
- Role: Rider
- Rider type: Pursuit

Professional teams
- 2005: Illes Balears–Banesto
- 2006–2007: Grupo Nicolás Mateos
- 2009: Andorra–Grandvalira
Medal record
Representing Spain
Men's track cycling
Olympic Games
Bronze medal – third place	2004 Athens	Individual pursuit
Bronze medal – third place	2004 Athens	Team pursuit
World Championships
Gold medal – first place	2004 Melbourne	Individual pursuit
Silver medal – second place	2005 Los Angeles	Individual pursuit
Bronze medal – third place	2003 Stuttgart	Individual pursuit
Bronze medal – third place	2004 Melbourne	Team pursuit
Bronze medal – third place	2007 Palma de Mallorca	Individual pursuit

Sergi Escobar Roure (born 22 September 1974) is a Spanish world champion track cyclist who specialises in individual and team pursuit.

He won his 1st medal at the World Cycling Championship in 2003 in Stuttgart, Germany

== Career highlights ==
2001
1st, Stage 6, Volta a Lleida
3rd, National Championship, Road, ITT, Elite, Spain, Leon (ESP)
1st, Mediterranean Games, Road, ITT, Elite
2002
1st, Overall, Cinturón Ciclista Internacional a Mallorca
2003
3rd, World Championship, Track, Pursuit, Elite, Stuttgart
2003 World Cup

1st, Pursuit, Moscow
3rd, Pursuit, Cape Town

1st, Stage 4, Vuelta a Alicante
2nd, Overall, Cinturón Ciclista Internacional a Mallorca

1st, Stage 1

1st, Stage 4, Vuelta a León
3rd, Overall, Volta Provincia Tarragona
National Track Championships, Valencia

1st, Pursuit

2004
World Championships, Melbourne

1st, Pursuit
3rd, Team Pursuit

2004 World Cup

1st, Pursuit, Aguascalientes
3rd, Team Pursuit, Aguascalientes
2nd, Pursuit, Manchester

3rd, Overall, Vuelta a Alicante

1st, Prologue

National Track Championships, Palma de Mallorca

1st, Pursuit
1st, Madison (with Antonio Miguel Parra)

1st, Stage 1, Cinturón Ciclista Internacional a Mallorca
1st, Stage 3, Vuelta a Avila
Olympic Games, Athens

3rd, Pursuit
3rd, Team Pursuit

2004–2005 World Cup

3rd, Pursuit, Los Angeles

2005
2nd, Clásica de Almería
World Championships, Los Angeles

2nd, Pursuit

2006
2005–2006 World Cup

1st, Pursuit, Los Angeles
3rd, Team Pursuit, Los Angeles

National Track Championships

1st, Pursuit
1st, Team Pursuit

1st, Overall, Vuelta a la Comunidad de Madrid

2007
National Track Championships

1st, Pursuit, Elite
1st, Team Pursuit
1st, Points race

World Championships, Palma de Mallorca

3rd, Pursuit

2008
2007–2008 World Cup

3rd, Los Angeles, Pursuit, Los Angeles
1st, Pursuit, Copenhagen

1st, Overall, Volta de Castello
