= 2002 Men's Hockey World Cup squads =

This article lists the confirmed squads for the 2002 Men's Hockey World Cup tournament to be held in Kuala Lumpur, Malaysia between 24 February and 9 March 2002.

== Pool A ==
=== Argentina ===
The following players were named for the Argentina team.

Head coach: Jorge Ruiz

1. Pablo Moreira (C, GK)
2. Juan Pablo Hourquebie
3. Maximiliano Caldas
4. Matías Vila
5. Ezequiel Paulón
6. Mariano Chao (GK)
7. Mario Almada
8. Carlos Retegui
9. Rodrigo Vila
10. Tomás MacCormik
11. Santiago Capurro
12. Marco Riccardi
13. Jorge Lombi
14. Fernando Zylberberg
15. Germán Orozco
16. Fernando Oscaris
17. Matías Paredes
18. Juan Eduardo Garreta

=== Belgium ===
The following players were named for the Belgium team.

Head coach: Giles Bonnet

1. Vincent Deneumostier (GK)
2. Gilles Petre
3. Xavier Reckinger
4. Thierry Renaer
5. Xavier-Charles Letier
6. Loic Vandeweghe
7. Joeri Beunen
8. Thomas van den Balck
9. Maxime Luycx
10. Fabian Berger
11. Vitali Kholopov
12. Xavier Brooke
13. Mick Beunen
14. Jean Willems (C)
15. Marc Coudron
16. Manu Leroy (GK)
17. Charles Vandeweghe
18. Robin Geens

=== Germany ===
The following players were named for the Germany team.

Head Coach: Bernhard Peters

1. Clemens Arnold (GK)
2. Christian Schulte (GK)
4. Philipp Crone
5. Jamilon Mülders
6. Christian Wein
7. Björn Michel
8. Sascha Reinelt
9. Oliver Domke
10. Christoph Eimer
11. Björn Emmerling
12. Sebastian Biederlack
13. Michael Green
14. Tibor Weißenborn
15. Florian Kunz (C)
16. Christian Mayerhöfer
17. Timo Weß
18. Christoph Bechmann
22. Matthias Witthaus

=== Netherlands ===
The following players were named for the Netherlands team.

Head coach: Joost Bellaart

1. Guus Vogels (GK)
2. Bram Lomans
3. Diederik van Weel
4. Erik Jazet
7. Sander van der Weide
8. Ronald Brouwer
9. Piet-Hein Geeris
11. Marten Eikelboom
12. Jeroen Delmee (C)
13. Josef Kramer (GK)
14. Teun de Nooijer
15. Remco van Wijk
16. Jaap-Derk Buma
19. Matthijs Brouwer
21. Karel Klaver
23. Rob Derikx
24. Taeke Taekema
25. Menno Booij

=== New Zealand ===
The following players were named for the New Zealand team.

Head Coach: Kevin Towns

1. Simon Towns (C)
2. Mitesh Patel
3. David Kosoof
4. Darren Smith
6. Dion Gosling
7. Blair Hopping
8. Dean Couzins
10. Ryan Archibald
11. Umesh Parag
12. Alphesh Puna
14. Bevan Hari
15. Michael Bevin (GK)
16. Paul Woolford (GK)
17. Ken Robinson
18. Phil Burrows
19. Hayden Shaw
20. Hymie Gill
23. Peter Stafford

=== Pakistan ===
The following players were named for the Pakistan team.

Head Coach: Abdul Khan

1. Muhammad Qasim (GK)
3. Tariq Imran
5. Sohail Abbas
7. Waseem Ahmed
9. Muhammad Usman
10. Muhammad Saqlain
11. Ali Raza
12. Salman Akbar (GK)
13. Dilawar Hussain
17. Ghazanfar Ali
18. Muhammad Nadeem
19. Muddasar Ali Khan
23. Muhammad Sarwar (C)
25. Kashif Jawad
27. Shahbaz Ahmed
28. Atif Bashir
29. Shabbir Muhammad
31. Khalid Saleem

=== South Africa ===
The following players were named for the South Africa team.

Head coach: Rob Pullen

1. Christopher Hibbert (GK)
4. Craig Jackson (C)
5. Craig Fulton
6. Bruce Jacobs
7. Gregg Clark
8. Gareth Murray
9. Emile Smith
10. Mike Cullen
11. Clyde Abrahams
12. Justin King
13. Greg Nicol
15. Kevin Chree
16. Brenton Key
18. Wayne Denne
20. David Viney
22. David Staniforth (GK)
26. Denzil Dolley
27. Marvin Bam

=== Spain ===
The following players were named for the Spain team.

Head coach: Toni Forrellat

1. Bernardino Herrera (GK)
4. Jordi Quintana
5. Francisco Fábregas Monegal
7. Juan Escarré
8. Jordi Casas
9. Pol Amat
10. Eduard Tubau
11. Javier Arnau (C)
12. Ramón Sala
13. Ramón Alegre
14. Josep Sánchez
15. Víctor Sojo
16. Xavier Ribas
17. Albert Sala
18. Rodrigo Garza
19. Eduardo Aguilar
21. Jaime Perez
22. Javier Bruses (GK)

== Pool B ==
=== Australia ===
The following players were named for the Australia team.

Head coach: Barry Dancer

1. Jamie Dwyer
2. Liam de Young
3. Adam Commens
4. Michael McCann
5. Troy Elder
8. Lachlan Dreher (GK)
9. Jeremy Hiskins
10. Paul Gaudoin (C)
12. Andrew Smith
14. Daniel Sproule
15. Bevan George
17. Craig Victory
19. Mark Hickman (GK)
20. Scott Webster
21. Aaron Hopkins
23. Matthew Wells
25. Brent Livermore
26. Dean Butler

=== Cuba ===
The following players were named for the Cuba team.

Head coach: Guillermo Stakeman

1. Yeol Gomez Aguilar (GK)
2. Eduardo Aroche (GK)
3. Yoandy Blanco
4. Yumai Oliva Alan
5. Rolando Larringa Perrez
6. Yuniel Villanueva Lorenzo
7. Diornis Garcia Almanza
8. Alain Bardaji (C)
9. Edel Beny Sayas Gonzalez
10. Juan Benavides Ojeda
11. Jose M Rodriguez Garcia
12. Diosmany Garces Aviles
13. Yoel Delis Mosquera Enriquez
14. Yuniel Rodriguez Hernandez
15. Joan Hernandez
16. Yuri Perez
17. Roberto Lemus
18. Alexander Abreu

=== England ===
The following players were named for the England team.

Head coach: Malcolm Wood

1. Jimi Lewis (GK)
2. Simon Mason (GK)
3. Jon Wyatt
5. Bill Waugh
6. Craig Parnham (C)
8. David Mathews
9. Mark Pearn
10. Jimmy Wallis
11. Brett Garrard
13. Danny Hall
14. Guy Fordham
16. Andy Humphrey
18. Jerome Goudie
19. Mike Johnson
23. Tom Bertram
25. Ben Sharpe
26. Robert Todd
28. Martin Jones

=== India ===
The following players were named for the India team.

Head coach: Cedric D'Souza

1. Devesh Chauhan (GK)
3. Ignace Tirkey
4. Baljit Singh Saini
6. Prabhjot Singh
7. Jugraj Singh
8. Dilip Tirkey
9. Dhanraj Pillay
10. Baljit Singh (C)
12. Jude Menezes (GK)
14. Sabu Varkey
16. Sukhbir Singh Gill
17. Lazarus Barla
18. Arjun Halappa
19. Deepak Thakur
22. Bipin Fernandez
24. Kanwalpreet Singh
25. Daljit Singh
27. Thirumal Valavan

=== Japan ===
The following players were named for the Japan team.

Head coach: Manabu Yamanaka

1. Takahiko Yamabori (C)
2. Naoya Iwadate
3. Kenji Asai
4. Makoto Karuo
5. Ryuji Furusato
6. Akira Takahashi
7. Kenichi Katayama
8. Naohiko Tobita
9. Kazuyuki Ozawa
10. Atsushi Takehara
11. Daisuke Hokaze
12. Akihiko Hirata
13. Takaya Fukuoka
14. Mitsuru Ito
15. Jun Takahashi (GK)
16. Yasuhiro Nobui (GK)
18. Ryuhei Harada
19. Yasuhiro Kikkawa

=== Malaysia ===
The following players were named for the Malaysia team.

Head coach: Paul Lissek

1. Roslan Jamaluddin (GK)
2. Maninderjit Singh Sidhu
3. Chua Boon Huat
4. Krishnamurthy Gobinathan
5. Kuhan Shanmuganathan
6. Bakar Nor Azlan
7. Zhairil Anwar Abd Aziz
8. Jiwa Mohan
9. Madzli Mohd Nor
10. Tajol Mohamed
11. Mohd Rodhanizam Mat Radzi
12. Raj Keevan
13. Mirnawan Nawawi (C)
14. Logan Raj Kali Kavandan
15. Shaiful Azli Abd Rahman
16. Nasihini Ibrahim (GK)
17. Mohd Fairuz Ramly
18. Shankar Shanmugam

=== Poland ===
The following players were named for the Poland team.

Head coach: Jerzy Joskowiak

1. Marcin Pobuta (GK)
2. Eugeniusz Gaczkowski
3. Mariusz Gromadzki
4. Dariusz Malecki
5. Tomasz Spalek
7. Robert Grzeszczak (C)
8. Zbigniew Juszczak
10. Robert Grotowski
11. Marcin Strykowski
12. Mariusz Chyla
13. Slawomir Choczaj
14. Tomasz Choczaj
16. Artur Mikuła
17. Marcin Wichlacz
18. Krysztof Witczak
21. Łukasz Wybieralski
22. Miroslaw Juszczak

=== South Korea ===
The following players were named for the South Korea team.

Head coach: Kim Young-kyu

1. Kang Keon-wook (C)
2. Shin Seok-kyo
3. Lim Jong-chun (GK)
5. Kim Yong-bae
6. Han Hyung-bae
7. Yeo Woon-kon
8. Kim Jung-chul
9. Song Seung-tae
10. Seo Jong-ho
11. Lee Jung-seon
12. Yoon Sung-hoon
14. Yoo Moon-ki
15. Kim Kyung-seok
16. Kim Yoon (GK)
18. Yang Soo-kyuk
19. Hwang Jong-hyun
20. Lim Jung-woo
21. Kim Chul
