= Argentina at the 2000 Summer Olympics =

- IOC code: ARG
- NOC: Argentine Olympic Committee
- Website: www.coarg.org.ar (in Spanish)

in Sydney
- Competitors: 143 (98 men and 45 women) in 21 sports
- Flag bearer: Carlos Espínola
- Medals Ranked 57th: Gold 0 Silver 2 Bronze 2 Total 4

Summer Olympics appearances (overview)
- 1900; 1904; 1908; 1912; 1920; 1924; 1928; 1932; 1936; 1948; 1952; 1956; 1960; 1964; 1968; 1972; 1976; 1980; 1984; 1988; 1992; 1996; 2000; 2004; 2008; 2012; 2016; 2020; 2024; 2028

Argentina competed at the 2000 Summer Olympics in Sydney, Australia. 143 competitors, 98 men and 45 women, took part in 98 events in 21 sports.

== Medalists ==
Medal	Name	Sport	Event	Date
Silver	Argentina national field hockey team: Magdalena Aicega; Mariela Antoniska; Inés Arrondo; Luciana Aymar; María Paz Ferrari; Anabel Gambero; Soledad García; María de la Paz Hernández; Laura Maiztegui; Mercedes Margalot; Karina Masotta; Vanina Oneto; Jorgelina Rimoldi; Cecilia Rognoni; Ayelén Stepnik; Paola Vukojicic	Field hockey	Women's tournament	29 September
Silver	Carlos Espínola	Sailing	Men's Mistral	24 September
Bronze	Serena Amato	Sailing	Women's Europe	29 September
Bronze	Javier Conte; Juan de la Fuente	Sailing	Men's 470	28 September

== Competitors ==
The following is the list of number of competitors in the Games.

Sport	Men	Women	Total
Athletics	6	5	11
Beach volleyball	4	0	4
Boxing	7	–	7
Canoeing	3	0	3
Cycling	7	1	8
Diving	0	1	1
Equestrian	1	0	1
Fencing	2	1	3
Field hockey	16	16	32
Gymnastics	0	1	1
Judo	7	2	9
Rowing	5	3	8
Sailing	8	3	11
Shooting	3	1	4
Swimming	7	6	13
Table tennis	2	0	2
Taekwondo	2	0	2
Tennis	4	4	8
Triathlon	1	0	1
Volleyball	12	0	12
Weightlifting	1	1	2
Total	98	45	143

== Athletics ==
Men

Athlete	Events	Heat		Quarterfinal		Semifinal		Final	
Athlete	Events	Result	Rank	Result	Rank	Result	Rank	Result	Rank
Gabriel Simon	100 m	10.56	5	Did not advance					
Carlos Gats	200 m	21.15	5	Did not advance					
Gustavo Aguirre	400 m	47.03	5	Did not advance					
Marcelo Pugliese	Discus	56.30	19	N/A				Did not advance	
Juan Ignacio Cerra	Hammer	72.86	15	N/A				Did not advance	
Oscar Cortínez	Marathon	N/A						2:25:01	58

Women

Athlete	Events	Heat		Quarterfinal		Semifinal		Final	
Athlete	Events	Result	Rank	Result	Rank	Result	Rank	Result	Rank
Elisa Cobañea	5000 m	16:16.58	14	N/A		Did not advance			
Verónica de Paoli	100 m hurdles	14.61	8	Did not advance					
Andrea Ávila	Long jump	6.11	16	N/A				Did not advance	
Solange Witteveen	High jump	1.89	10	N/A				Did not advance	
Alejandra García	Pole vault	4.15	9	N/A				Did not advance	

== Boxing ==
Athlete	Event	Round of 32	Round of 16	Quarterfinals	Semifinals	Final	
Athlete	Event	Opposition Result	Opposition Result	Opposition Result	Opposition Result	Opposition Result	Rank
Omar Andrés Narváez	Flyweight	Valcárcel (PUR); W	Sydorenko (UKR); L	Did not advance			
Ceferino Labarda	Bantamweight	Malakhbekov (RUS); L (RSC)	Did not advance				
Israel Héctor Perez	Featherweight	Bye	Simelane (SWZ); W (RSC)	Tamsamani (MAR); L	Did not advance		
Victor Hugo Castro	Light Welterweight	Huste (GER); L	Did not advance				
Guillermo Saputo	Welterweight	Dotsenko (UKR); L	Did not advance				
Mariano Natalio Carrera	Middleweight	Kuloglu (TUR); L (RSC)	Did not advance				
Hugo Garay	Light Heavyweight	Orazaliev (KAZ); L (RSC)	Did not advance				

Key:

- RSC – Referee stopped contest

== Canoeing ==
=== Flatwater ===
Athlete	Event	Heats		Semifinals		Final	
Athlete	Event	Time	Rank	Time	Rank	Time	Rank
Javier Correa	Men's K-1 500 m	1:41.557	1 Q	1:42.784	6	Did not advance	
Javier Correa	Men's K-1 1000 m	1:40.275	2 Q	3:37.975	1 Q	3:35.687	5
Fernando Martín Redondo, Abelardo Andres Sztrum	Men's K-2 1000 m	3:24.324	9	Did not advance			

== Cycling ==
=== Mountain bike ===
Athlete	Event	Time	Rank
Ignacio Gili	Men's cross-country	DNF	
Jimena Florit	Women's cross-country	2:00:49.05	20

=== Track ===
Pursuits

Athlete	Event	Qualifying		1st round		Finals	
Athlete	Event	Time	Rank	Opposition Time	Rank	Opposition Time	Rank
Walter Pérez	Men's individual pursuit	4:30.757	8	Did not advance			
Walter Pérez, Edgardo Simón, Gonzalo Martín García, Juan Guillermo Brunetta	Men's team pursuit	4:10.940	9	Did not advance			

Points races

Athlete	Event	Points	Rank
Juan Curuchet	Men's points race	8	14
Juan Curuchet, Gabriel Curuchet	Men's madison	9	7

== Diving ==
Athlete	Events	Preliminary		Semifinal		Final	
Athlete	Events	Points	Rank	Points	Rank	Points	Rank
Svetlana Ishkova	Women's 3 m springboard	185.61	40	Did not advance			

== Equestrian ==
Athlete	Horse	Event	Qualifying round 1		Qualifying round 2			Qualifying round 3			Final					
Athlete	Horse	Event	Qualifying round 1		Qualifying round 2			Qualifying round 3			Round A		Round B		Total	
Athlete	Horse	Event	Penalties	Rank	Penalties	Total	Rank	Penalties	Total	Rank	Penalties	Rank	Penalties	Rank	Penalties	Rank
Martín Dopazo	Calwaro	Show jumping	2.25	4	12.25	14.50	22	12.00	26.50	31 Q	12	=20 Q	17.50	=18	Did not advance	

== Fencing ==
Athlete	Event	Round of 64	Round of 32	Round of 16	Quarterfinals	Semifinals	Final
Athlete	Event	Opposition Result	Opposition Result	Opposition Result	Opposition Result	Opposition Result	Opposition Result
Diego Drajer	Men's individual sabre	Williams (GBR); L 13–15	Did not advance				
Leandro Marchetti	Men's individual foil	Guyart (FRA); L 6–15	Did not advance				
Alejandra Carbone	Women's individual foil	Shimada (JPN); W 15–13	Xiao (CHN); L 8–15	Did not advance			

== Field hockey ==
=== Men ===
Team roster and tournament statistics

Coach: Jorge Ruiz

No.	Player	GP	G	S	FG	PC	PS	Green card	Yellow card	Red card
1	Pablo Moreira (GK)	5	0	0						
2	Juan Pablo Hourquebie	7	0	2						
3	Máximo Pellegrino	7	0	0						
4	Matias Vila	7	1	3	1			1		
5	Ezequiel Paulón	6	0	0					1	
6	Mariano Chao	3	0	0						
7	Mario Almada	7	1	3	1					
8	Carlos Retegui	7	0	0				1	2	
9	Rodrigo Vila	7	0	4						
10	Tomás MacCormik	7	0	0				1		
11	Santiago Capurro	7	1	8		1				
12	Marcos Riccardi	7	0	0						
13	Jorge Lombi	7	13	10	4	9			1	
14	Fernando Zylberberg	7	0	0				2		
15	Germán Orozco	7	0	0				2		
16	Fernando Oscaris	6	0	1				1		
Team totals		7	16	31	6	10	0	8	4	0

Legend: GP – Games Played; G – Goals; S – Shots; FG – Field Goals; PC – Penalty Corners; PS – Penalty Strokes; Green Cards; (yellow card) Yellow Cards; (red card) Red Cards

Preliminary round (Pool B)

Team	Pld	W	D	L	GF	GA	Pts
Australia	5	3	2	0	12	6	11
South Korea	5	2	2	1	9	7	8
India	5	2	2	1	9	7	8
Argentina	5	1	2	2	13	13	5
Poland	5	1	2	2	12	14	5
Spain	5	0	2	3	7	15	2

Qualified for semifinals

17 September
10:30

Argentina	0 – 3	India
		Dad 25', 60'; Kumar 35'
Orozco 20'; Retegui 21'; Lombi 56'	≪ Discipline ≫	Thakur 67'

Umpires:
Amarjit Singh (MAS)
Richard Wolter (GER)

19 September
18:30

Argentina	2 – 2	South Korea
Lombi 5', 67'		Yeo 7'; Ji 63'
Retegui 22'; Zylberberg 41'; Retegui 54'	≪ Discipline ≫	Lim 42'

Umpires:
Sumesh Putra (CAN)
Richard Wolter (GER)

21 September
18:30

Argentina	5 – 5	Poland
Lombi 6', 23', 41', 63'; Capurro 66'		Wybieralski 31'; Mikula 45', 51'; Jakubiak 60'; Grotowski 67'
Zylberberg 46'	≪ Discipline ≫	Lim 42'

Umpires:
Jason MacCracken (NZL)
Sumesh Putra (CAN)

23 September
18:30

Australia	2 – 1	Argentina
Sproule 56'; Brennan 62'		Lombi 54'
Gaudoin 52'; Brennan 64'	≪ Discipline ≫	MacCormik 64'

Umpires:
Peter von Reth (NED)
Eric Denis (BEL)

25 September
8:30

Spain	1 – 5	Argentina
Ribas 5'		Lombi 23', 45', 66'; M. Vila 54'; Almada 57'
Malgosa 55'	≪ Discipline ≫	Orozco 34'

Umpires:
Ray O'Connor (IRL)
Amarjit Singh (MAS)

5th to 8th place classification

28 September
11:30

Germany	6 – 2	Argentina
Domke 40'; Emmerling 42'; Bechmann 44', 64'; Michel 66', 70'		Lombi 13', 14'
Bechmann 22'	≪ Discipline ≫	M. Vila 7'; Paulón 43'

Umpires:
Ray O'Connor (IRL)
Han Jin-Soo (KOR)

7th place match

29 September
11:30

India	3 – 1	Argentina
Thakur 30'; Gill 47'; Pillay 63'		Lombi 52'
Saini 14'; Dhillon 54', 66'	≪ Discipline ≫	Oscaris 18'

Umpires:
Richard Wolter (GER)
Murray Grime (GER)

=== Women ===
Team roster and tournament statistics

Coach: Sergio Vigil

No.	Player	GP	G	S	FG	PC	PS	Green card	Yellow card	Red card
1	Mariela Antoniska (GK)	8	0	0						
2	Soledad García	8	4	7	3	1				
3	Magdalena Aicega	8	0	0						
4	María Paz Ferrari	8	0	2				1		
5	Anabel Gambero	8	0	2						
6	Ayelén Stepnik	8	0	3						
7	Inés Arrondo	8	0	0					1	
8	Luciana Aymar	8	3	8	2	1				
9	Vanina Oneto	8	5	15	5			1		
10	Jorgelina Rimoldi	8	1	2	1			1		
11	Karina Masotta (C)	8	3	10	3			1		
12	Paola Vukojicic (GK)	1	0	0						
13	Laura Maiztegui	7	0	3						
14	Mercedes Margalot	8	0	0						
15	María de la Paz Hernández	8	0	0						
16	Cecilia Rognoni	8	1	2		1				
Team totals		8	18	54	15	3	0	4	1	0

Preliminary round (Pool C)

Team	Pld	W	D	L	GF	GA	Pts
Australia	4	3	1	0	9	3	10
Argentina	4	2	0	2	5	6	6
Spain	4	1	2	1	2	3	5
Great Britain	4	1	1	2	5	5	4
South Korea	4	0	2	2	4	8	2

Qualified for semifinals

16 September
8:30

South Korea	2–3	Argentina
Shin 20'; Cho 33'		Masotta 9'; Aymar 44'; Rimoldi 68'
Lee 8'; Kim 14'	≪ Discipline ≫	Masotta 47'

Umpires:
Gina Spitaleri (ITA)
Miriam van Gemert (NED)

18 September
18:30

Great Britain	0–1	Argentina
		Masotta 11'
Johnson 30'; Richardson 55'; Walsh 64'	≪ Discipline ≫	Arrondo 46'

Umpires:
Renee Cohen (NED)
Gina Spitaleri (ITA)

20 September
20:30

Australia	3–1	Argentina
Morris 25'; Starre 33'; Mitchell-Taverner 63'		García 66'

Umpires:
Renee Cohen (NED)
Miriam van Gemert (NED)

21 September
18:30

Argentina	0–1	Spain
		Goikoetxea 40'
Rimoldi 52'	≪ Discipline ≫	de Ignacio 34'

Umpires:
Marelize de Klerk (RSA)
Kazuko Yasueda (JPN)

Medal pool

Results from matches against Australia and Spain were carried over from the preliminary round.

Team	Pld	W	D	L	GF	GA	Pts
Australia	5	4	1	0	17	3	13
Argentina	5	3	0	2	13	7	9
Netherlands	5	2	0	3	8	14	6
Spain	5	1	3	1	5	5	6
China	5	1	1	3	4	10	4
New Zealand	5	1	1	3	8	16	4

Competed for the gold medal
Competed for the bronze medal

24 September
14:00

Argentina	3–1	Netherlands
Aymar 3'; García 26', 50'		Smabers 12'

Umpires:
Kazuko Yasueda (JPN)
Ute Conen (GER)

25 September
18:30

Argentina	2–1	China
Aymar 35'; García 52'		Tang 6'
	≪ Discipline ≫	Liu 27'; Huang 29'

Umpires:
Lyn Farrell (NZL)
Renee Cohen (NED)

27 September
16:30

Argentina	7–1	New Zealand
Rognoni 9', 47'; Oneto 12', 40', 42'; Masotta 31'		Bell-Kake 33'
Ferrari 5'	≪ Discipline ≫

Umpires:
Shin Jung-Hee (KOR)
Kazuko Yasueda (JPN)

Gold medal match

29 September
20:00

Australia	3–1	Argentina
Annan 10'; Haslam 26'; Morris 38'		Oneto 44'
	≪ Discipline ≫	Oneto 8'

Umpires:
Miriam van Gemert (NED)
Kazuko Yasueda (JPN)

== Gymnastics ==
=== Artistic ===
Athlete	Event	Apparatus				Qualification		Final	
Athlete	Event	Floor	Vault	Uneven bars	Balance beam	Total	Rank	Total	Rank
Melina Sirolli	All-around	9.162	9.256	9.037	8.950	36.405	48	Did not advance	
Melina Sirolli	Floor	9.162	N/A			9.162	49	Did not advance	
Melina Sirolli	Vault	N/A	9.256	N/A		9.256	38	Did not advance	
Melina Sirolli	Uneven bars	N/A		9.037	N/A	9.037	71	Did not advance	
Melina Sirolli	Balance beam	N/A			8.950	8.950	67	Did not advance	

== Judo ==
Men

Athlete	Event	Round of 32	Round of 16	Quarterfinals	Semifinals	Final	Repechage 1	Repechage 2	Repechage 3	Bronze
Athlete	Event	Opposition Result	Opposition Result	Opposition Result	Opposition Result	Opposition Result	Opposition Result	Opposition Result	Opposition Result	Opposition Result
Jorge Lencina	-60 kg	Smagulov (KGZ); L 0001–1001	Did not advance							
Martín Ríos	-66 kg	Matsiev (RUS); L 0000–0200	Did not advance							
Sebastián Alquati	-73 kg	Payne (BAR); W 1010–0010	Choi (KOR); L 0001–0110	Did not advance			Pedro (USA); L 0001–0202	Did not advance		
Dario García	-81 kg	Azizov (AZE)^{[a]} W 1000–0000; Echarte (ESP); W 0002–0001	Takimoto (JPN); L 0000–1000	Did not advance			Seilkhanov (KAZ); L 0111–1001	Did not advance		
Eduardo Costa	-90 kg	Monti (ITA); W 1010–0100	Yoo (KOR); W 1021–0100	Demontfaucon (FRA); L 0000–1000	Did not advance		Bye	Mashurenko (UKR); L 0001–1000	Did not advance	
Alejandro Bender	-100 kg	Paškevičius (LTU); L 0000–1000	Did not advance							
Orlando Baccino	+100 kg	Csösz (HUN); W 1000–0000	Pan (CHN); L 0010–1010	Did not advance						

- ^{a} As there were more than 32 qualifiers for the tournament, three first round matches were held to reduce the field to 32 judoka.

Women

Athlete	Event	Round of 32	Round of 16	Quarterfinals	Semifinals	Final	Repechage 1	Repechage 2	Repechage 3	Bronze
Athlete	Event	Opposition Result	Opposition Result	Opposition Result	Opposition Result	Opposition Result	Opposition Result	Opposition Result	Opposition Result	Opposition Result
Carolina Mariani	-52 kg	Bye	Shih (TPE); W 0001–0000	Verdecia (CUB); L	Did not advance			Bye	Leon (ESP); L 0002–1001	Did not advance
Daniela Krukower	-70 kg	Bah (GUI); W 1040–0000	Howey (GBR); L 0000–0201	Did not advance			Bye	Bosch (NED); L 0001–0001	Did not advance	

== Rowing ==
Men

Athlete(s)	Event	Heats		Repechage		Semifinals		Final	
Athlete(s)	Event	Time	Rank	Time	Rank	Time	Rank	Time	Rank
Sergio Fernández González	Single sculls	7:20.65	4	7:13.68	2	Did not advance			
Damián Ordás, Diego Aguirre	Lightweight double sculls	6:40.16	3	6:41.10	3	Did not advance			
Ulf Lienhard, Sebastián Massa	Coxless pair	6:55.74	4	6:52.38	4	Did not advance			

Women

Athlete(s)	Event	Heats		Repechage		Semifinals		Final	
Athlete(s)	Event	Time	Rank	Time	Rank	Time	Rank	Time	Rank
Paola López	Single sculls	8:06.65	4	8:03.83	3	Did not advance			
Paola López	Lightweight double sculls	7:30.74	5	7:28.19	4	Did not advance			

== Sailing ==
Eight men and three women competed in the Sailing competition for Argentina at the 2000 Olympic Games. They won one silver medal and two bronze medals.

Men

Athlete	Event	Race											Score	Rank
Athlete	Event	1	2	3	4	5	6	7	8	9	10	11	Score	Rank
Javier Conte, Juan de la Fuente	470	11	6	8	5	(30); OCS	6	3	7	1	(17)	10	57	Bronze
Carlos Espínola	Mistral	8	3	8	1	5	7	2	(26)	6	(11)	3	43	Silver
Eduardo Farré, Mariano Lucca	Star	10	(15)	14	15	(17); DNC	14	14	14	13	14	11	119	16
Santiago Lange, Mariano Parada	Tornado	6	13	10	3	8	5	6	(17)	(15); OCS	14	10	75	10
Diego Romero	Laser	21	25	23	10	13	21	18	(28)	(27)	27	4	162	23

Women

Athlete	Event	Race											Score	Rank
Athlete	Event	1	2	3	4	5	6	7	8	9	10	11	Score	Rank
Serena Amato	Europe	6	(15)	9	5	2	2	6	1	(14)	12	8	51	Bronze
Maria Fernanda Sesto, Paula Reinoso	470	10	6	(16)	8	(15)	8	13	1	7	6	13	72	12

Key

- OCS – On the course side of the starting line – A type of disqualification (scores one higher than the number of boats in the race)
- DNC – Did not come to starting area

== Shooting ==
Athlete	Event	Qualification		Final		Rank
Athlete	Event	Score	Rank	Score	Total	Rank
Pablo Álvarez	Men's 10 m air rifle	586	31	Did not advance		31
Pablo Álvarez	Men's 50 m rifle three positions	1150	=33	Did not advance		=33
Pablo Álvarez	Men's 50 m rifle prone	582	49	Did not advance		49
Daniel Felizia	Men's 25 m rapid fire pistol	571	18	Did not advance		18
Daniel Felizia	Men's trap	109	=23	Did not advance		=23
Amelia Fournel	Women's 10 m air rifle	390	=28	Did not advance		=28
Amelia Fournel	Women's 50 m rifle three positions	542	41	Did not advance		41

== Swimming ==
Argentina competed in 18 swimming events, 11 men and 7 women, but only advanced out of the preliminary heats in one event.

Men

Athlete	Events	Heat		Semifinal		Final	
Athlete	Events	Time	Rank	Time	Rank	Time	Rank
Pablo Abal	100 m butterfly	54.45	28	Did not advance			
Walter Arciprete	200 m individual medley	2:08.89	45	Did not advance			
Andrés Bicocca	200 m breaststroke	2:20.98	37	Did not advance			
Sergio Ferreyra	100 m backstroke	58.09	53	Did not advance			
Agustín Fiorilli	400 m freestyle	3:59.94	32	Did not advance			
Agustín Fiorilli	1500 m freestyle	15:52.69	35	Did not advance			
José Meolans	50 m freestyle	22.89	21	Did not advance			
José Meolans	100 m freestyle	49.75	12 Q	49.66	10	Did not advance	
Eduardo Otero	100 m backstroke	58.09	40	Did not advance			
Eduardo Otero	200 m backstroke	2:05.51	34	Did not advance			
Pablo Abal, Sergio Ferreyra, José Meolans, Eduardo Otero	4 × 100 m medley relay	3:43.61	18	N/A		Did not advance	

Women

Athlete	Events	Heat		Semifinal		Final	
Athlete	Events	Time	Rank	Time	Rank	Time	Rank
Ana Carolina Aguilera	200 m butterfly	2:21.23	35	Did not advance			
Georgina Bardach	400 m individual medley	4:54.31	21	N/A		Did not advance	
Cecilia Biagioli	800 m freestyle	9:04.02	26	N/A		Did not advance	
María Virginia Garrone	200 m individual medley	2:22.98	29	Did not advance			
Florencia Szigeti	100 m freestyle	57.20	23	Did not advance			
Florencia Szigeti	200 m freestyle	Disqualified					

== Table Tennis ==
Athlete	Event	Preliminary round	Round of 32	Round of 16	Quarterfinals	Semifinals	Final
Athlete	Event	Opposition Result	Opposition Result	Opposition Result	Opposition Result	Opposition Result	Opposition Result
Liu Song	Men's singles	Boll (GER); L 1–3; Al-Hammadi (QAT); W 3–1	Did not advance				
Liu Song, Pablo Tabachnik	Men's doubles	Huang – Liu (CAN); L 1–2; Eloi – Legout (FRA); L 0–2	N/A	Did not advance			

== Taekwondo ==
Athlete	Event	Round of 16	Quarterfinals	Semifinals	Repechage Quarterfinals	Repechage Semifinals	Final
Athlete	Event	Opposition Result	Opposition Result	Opposition Result	Opposition Result	Opposition Result	Opposition Result
Alejandro Hernando	Men's −68 kg	Bye	Saei (IRI); L 0–3	did not advance			
Gabriel Taraburelli	Men's −58 kg	Bye	Cruz (PHI); W 7–5	Mouroutsos (GRE); L 1–2	Bye	Sekkat (MAR); W 5–4	Bronze medal match Huang (TPE); L 0–3

== Tennis ==
Men

Athlete	Event	Round of 64	Round of 32	Round of 16	Quarterfinals	Semifinals	Final	
Athlete	Event	Opposition Score	Opposition Score	Opposition Score	Opposition Score	Opposition Score	Opposition Score	Rank
Juan Ignacio Chela	Singles	Escudé (FRA); W 6–7^{(5–7)}, 7–5, 6–1	Kafelnikov (RUS); L 6–7^{(4–7)}, 4–6	Did not advance				=17
Gastón Gaudio	Singles	Escudé (FRA); L 6–7^{(4–7)}, 6–4, 1–6	Did not advance					=33
Franco Squillari	Singles	Alami (MAR); L 4–6, 6–7^{(5–7)}	Did not advance					=33
Mariano Zabaleta	Singles	Ríos (CHI); W 6–7^{(8–10)}, 6–4, 7–5	Tarango (USA); W 6–2, 6–3	Mirnyi (BLR); L 6–7^{(4–7)}, 2–6	Did not advance			=9
Juan Ignacio Chela, Mariano Zabaleta	Doubles	N/A	Corretja (ESP); Costa (ESP); L 3–6, 4–6	Did not advance				=17

Women

Athlete	Event	Round of 64	Round of 32	Round of 16	Quarterfinals	Semifinals	Final	
Athlete	Event	Opposition Score	Opposition Score	Opposition Score	Opposition Score	Opposition Score	Opposition Score	Rank
Florencia Labat	Singles	Oremans (NED); L 2–6, 4–6	Did not advance					=33
María Emilia Salerni	Singles	Zvereva (BLR); W 6–3, 4–6, 6–2	Schett (AUT); L 6–7^{(5–7)}, 4–6	Did not advance				=17
Paola Suárez	Singles	Davenport (USA); L 2–6, 2–6	Did not advance					=33
Laura Montalvo, Paola Suárez	Doubles	N/A	Farina Elia (ITA); Grande (ITA); W 6–0, 6–0	Sequera (VEN); Vento (VEN); L 4–6, 1–6	Did not advance			=9

== Triathlon ==
Athlete	Event	Swim	T1	Cycle	T2	Run	Total time	Rank
Oscar Galíndez	Men's	18:28	0:23	58:59	0:21	32:48	1:50:59	28

== Volleyball ==
=== Beach ===
Athlete	Event	Preliminary round (3)	Round of 16	Quarterfinals	Semifinals	Final	Standing
Athlete	Event	Opposition Score	Opposition Score	Opposition Score	Opposition Score	Opposition Score	Standing
Mariano Baracetti; José Luis Salema	Men's	Grinlaubs – Slack (AUS); L 2 – 15	Did not advance				=19
Martín Conde; Esteban Martínez	Men's	Rafaelli – Pimponi (ITA)	Maia – Brenha (POR); L 3 – 15	Did not advance			=9

=== Indoor ===
Roster

Coach: Alberto Armoa

No.	Name	Date of birth
1	Marcos Milinkovic	22 December 1971
3	Christian Lares	18 January 1974
4	Leandro Maly	29 January 1976
5	Leonardo Patti	6 July 1978
6	Javier Weber	6 January 1966
7	Hugo Conte	14 April 1963
8	Juan Pablo Porello	27 June 1977
10	Alejandro Spajic	7 May 1976
11	Jerónimo Bidegain	16 January 1977
14	Sebastián Firpo	27 October 1976
15	Pablo Pereira	18 January 1974
17	Pablo Meana	10 June 1975

Group play

Pos	Team	Pld	W	L	Pts	SW	SL	SR	SPW	SPL	SPR	Qualification
1	Italy	5	5	0	10	15	4	3.750	482	421	1.145	Quarterfinals
2	Russia	5	4	1	9	13	7	1.857	465	443	1.050	Quarterfinals
3	FR Yugoslavia	5	3	2	8	12	9	1.333	489	461	1.061	Quarterfinals
4	Argentina	5	2	3	7	7	11	0.636	409	446	0.917	Quarterfinals
5	South Korea	5	1	4	6	8	14	0.571	491	504	0.974	
6	United States	5	0	5	5	5	15	0.333	417	478	0.872	

17 September 2000; 18:30	Argentina	3–1	United States	Sydney Entertainment Centre; Attendance: 8,519; Referees: Stoyan Stoyanov (Bulgaria), Wang Ching (China)
17 September 2000; 18:30	(24–26, 25–23, 25–21, 25–18)			Sydney Entertainment Centre; Attendance: 8,519; Referees: Stoyan Stoyanov (Bulgaria), Wang Ching (China)

19 September 2000; 10:00	Argentina	3–1	South Korea	Pavilion 4 Attendance: 4,442; Referees: Bela Hobor (Hungary), Mahmoud Abdel Megid (Egypt)
19 September 2000; 10:00	(25–23, 17–25, 30–28, 25–21)			Pavilion 4 Attendance: 4,442; Referees: Bela Hobor (Hungary), Mahmoud Abdel Megid (Egypt)

21 September 2000; 12:30	Italy	3–0	Argentina	Sydney Entertainment Centre; Attendance: 8,185; Referees: Fernando Nava (South Korea), Takashi Shimoyama (Japan)
21 September 2000; 12:30	(40–38, 25–18, 25–14)			Sydney Entertainment Centre; Attendance: 8,185; Referees: Fernando Nava (South Korea), Takashi Shimoyama (Japan)

23 September 2000; 10:00	Yugoslavia	3–1	Argentina	Pavilion 4 Attendance: 4,656; Referees: Wang Ning (China), Fernando Nava (Mexico)
23 September 2000; 10:00	(21–25, 25–15, 25–23, 25–22)			Pavilion 4 Attendance: 4,656; Referees: Wang Ning (China), Fernando Nava (Mexico)

25 September 2000; 10:00	Argentina	0–3	Russia	Pavilion 4 Attendance: 4,676; Referees: Songsak Chareonpong (Thailand), Takashi Shimoyama (Japan)
25 September 2000; 10:00	(23–25, 15–25, 20–25)			Pavilion 4 Attendance: 4,676; Referees: Songsak Chareonpong (Thailand), Takashi Shimoyama (Japan)

Quarterfinal

27 September 2000; 18:30	Brazil	1–3	Argentina	Sydney Entertainment Centre; Attendance: 8,381; Referees: Themistoklis Kalpaktsoglou (Greece), Stoyan Stoyanov (Bulgaria)
27 September 2000; 18:30	(25–17, 21–25, 19–25, 25–27)			Sydney Entertainment Centre; Attendance: 8,381; Referees: Themistoklis Kalpaktsoglou (Greece), Stoyan Stoyanov (Bulgaria)

Semifinal

29 September 2000; 18:30	Argentina	1–3	Russia	Sydney Entertainment Centre; Attendance: 8,177; Referees: José Perez Viento (Cuba), Wang Ching (China)
29 September 2000; 18:30	(25–27, 30–32, 25–21, 11–25)			Sydney Entertainment Centre; Attendance: 8,177; Referees: José Perez Viento (Cuba), Wang Ching (China)

Bronze medal match

1 October 2000; 12:30	Argentina	0–3	Italy	Sydney Entertainment Centre; Attendance: 8,743; Referees: Songsak Chareonpong (Thailand), Dean Turner (Australia)
1 October 2000; 12:30	(16–25, 15–25, 18–25)			Sydney Entertainment Centre; Attendance: 8,743; Referees: Songsak Chareonpong (Thailand), Dean Turner (Australia)

== Weightlifting ==
Women

Athlete	Event	Snatch			Clean & Jerk			Total	Rank
Athlete	Event	1	2	3	1	2	3	Total	Rank
Nora Koppel	– 63 kg	75.0	~~80.0~~	80.0	97.5	102.5	~~107.5~~	182.5	8

== See also ==
- Argentina at the 1999 Pan American Games

== Notes ==
- Wallechinsky, David (2004). The Complete Book of the Summer Olympics (Athens 2004 Edition). Toronto, Canada. ISBN 1-894963-32-6.
- International Olympic Committee (2001). The Results. Retrieved 12 November 2005.
- Sydney Organising Committee for the Olympic Games (2001). Official Report of the XXVII Olympiad Volume 1: Preparing for the Games. Retrieved 20 November 2005.
- Sydney Organising Committee for the Olympic Games (2001). Official Report of the XXVII Olympiad Volume 2: Celebrating the Games. Retrieved 20 November 2005.
- Sydney Organising Committee for the Olympic Games (2001). The Results. Retrieved 20 November 2005.
- International Olympic Committee Web Site
