= 2005 Men's EuroHockey Nations Championship squads =

This article lists the confirmed squads lists for 2005 Men's EuroHockey Nations Championship from August 28 to September 4, 2005 at the complex of hockeyclub ATV Leipzig in Leipzig, Germany.

== Group A ==
=== Belgium ===
Head coach: Giles Bonnet

No.	Player	Pos.	Age
1	Cédric Degreve	GK	26
2	Xavier Reckinger		22
3	Thierry Stumpe		26
4	Thierry Renaer (c)		29
6	Loic Vandeweghe		22
7	Jean-Philippe Brulé	DF	24
8	Thomas Van Den Balck		23
9	Maxime Luyckx		23
11	Charles Vandeweghe		23

No.	Player	Pos.	Age
13	Gilles Petre		24
14	Philippe Goldberg		26
15	Jérôme Dekeyser		22
17	Manu Leroy	GK	26
18	Patrice Houssein		28
23	John Goldberg		24
24	John-John Dohmen		17
27	Amaury De Cock		24
28	Jérôme Truyens		18

=== England ===
Head coach: Jason Lee

No.	Player	Pos.	Age
2	Andrew West	DF	24
3	Nick Brothers	GK	22
4	Glenn Kirkham	MF	22
5	Richard Alexander	DF	23
7	Jerome Goudie		28
8	James Stedman		22
10	Matt Daly	FW	22
11	Brett Garrard (c)	DF	28
12	Jonty Clarke	FW	24

No.	Player	Pos.	Age
13	Rob Moore	MF	24
14	Ben Hawes	MF	25
15	Scott Cordon	DF	25
17	Alastair Wilson	DF	21
18	Barry Middleton	MF	21
19	Jonathan Brown		19
20	James Tindall	FW	22
23	Jon Ebsworth	GK	27
24	Ben Marsden	DF	27

=== Germany ===
Head coach: Bernhard Peters

No.	Player	Pos.	Age
1	Christian Schulte	GK	30
2	Ulrich Bubolz	GK	24
4	Philipp Crone	DF	28
6	Eike Duckwitz	DF	25
7	Carlos Nevado	FW	23
10	Jan Marco Montag	DF	22
11	Björn Emmerling	DF	29
12	Sebastian Biederlack	MF	23
13	Justus Scharowsky	MF	25

No.	Player	Pos.	Age
14	Tibor Weissenborn	MF	24
16	Niklas Meinert	MF	24
17	Timo Wess (c)	DF	23
19	Christopher Zeller	FW	20
22	Matthias Witthaus	FW	22
23	Florian Keller	FW	23
26	Oliver Hentschel	FW	24
27	Oliver Markowsky	MF	21
29	Sebastian Draguhn	FW	21

=== Scotland ===
Head coach: Mathias Ahrens

No.	Player	Pos.	Age
2	David Mitchell		24
3	Michael Leonard (c)		31
4	Andy McBride		29
5	Niall Stott		24
6	John Christie		22
7	Andrew Sewnauth		23
8	Vishal Marwaha		29
9	Graham Moodie		24
10	Douglas Simpson		23

No.	Player	Pos.	Age
11	Mark Ralph		25
12	Michael Christie		18
13	Christopher Nelson		21
14	Craig Harper		22
16	Graham Dunlop		29
17	Kris Kane	GK	25
18	David Ralph		33
21	Alistair McGregor	GK	24
22	Stephen Dick		20

== Group B ==
=== France ===
Head coach: Bertrand Reynaud

No.	Player	Pos.	Age
1	Matthieu Durchon		24
2	Antoine Gouedard-Comte		22
3	Alexis Collon		22
4	Charles Verrier		27
5	Nicolas Monnier		26
6	Nicolas Muesgens		25
7	Christoph Muesgens		26
8	Florent Durchon		28
9	Julien Boyer	FW	27

No.	Player	Pos.	Age
10	Frédéric Soyez		27
11	Stéphane Jaquet	MF	32
14	Antoine Moreau (c)		28
15	Nicolas Gaillard		28
16	Arnoud Jansen		23
17	Gérôme Branquart		25
18	Frédéric Verrier		24
30	Julien Thamin	GK	25
31	Maxime Wilson	GK	21

=== Netherlands ===
Head coach: Roelant Oltmans

No.	Player	Pos.	Age
1	Guus Vogels	GK	30
3	Geert-Jan Derikx	DF	24
4	Karel Klaver	FW	26
5	Rob Derikx	MF	23
7	Sander van der Weide	DF	23
8	Ronald Brouwer	FW	26
10	Taeke Taekema	DF	25
12	Jeroen Delmee (c)	MF	32
13	Klaas Veering	GK	23

No.	Player	Pos.	Age
14	Teun de Nooijer	MF	29
16	Floris Evers	MF	22
18	Rob Reckers	FW	23
19	Matthijs Brouwer	FW	25
20	Jesse Mahieu	DF	27
21	Nick Meijer	FW
22	Roderick Weusthof	FW	23
23	Timme Hoyng	MF	29
24	Robert van der Horst	DF	20

=== Poland ===
Head coach: Maciej Matuszynski

No.	Player	Pos.	Age
1	Mariusz Chyla	GK	27
2	Tomasz Dutkiewicz		25
4	Dariusz Malecki		30
5	Miroslaw Kluczynski		25
6	Sebastian Wladysiak		22
7	Robert Grzeszczak		34
8	Zbigniew Juszczak		30
9	Dariusz Rachwalski		22
10	Rafal Grotowski		32

No.	Player	Pos.	Age
11	Tomasz Gorny		19
12	Arkadiusz Matuszak	GK
13	Slawomir Choczaj		31
14	Tomasz Choczaj		29
15	Piotr Mikula (c)		29
16	Artur Mikula		27
18	Marcin Grotowski		22
19	Tomasz Marcinkowski		24
20	Lukasz Wybieralski		30

=== Spain ===
Head coach: Maurits Hendriks

No.	Player	Pos.	Age
1	Bernardino Herrera	GK	27
2	Santi Freixa	FW	22
3	Miguel Delas
5	Francisco Fábregas		27
6	Andreu Enrich
7	Juan Escarré (c)
8	Alex Fábregas		24
9	Pablo Amat		27
10	Eduardo Tubau		24

No.	Player	Pos.	Age
13	Ramón Alegre	DF	24
15	Víctor Sojo	FW	21
16	Xavier Ribas	DF	29
17	Albert Sala	MF	24
18	Rodrigo Garza	DF	25
20	Sergi Enrique	DF	17
21	Eduard Arbos		22
22	Francisco Cortes	GK	22
23	David Alegre	MF	20
