= 2005 Men's Hockey Champions Challenge =

Sports season of a field hockey competition

Tournament details
- Host country: Egypt
- City: Alexandria
- Dates: 1 April – 9 April
- Teams: 6
- Venue: Smouha Club

Final positions
- Champions: Argentina (1st title)
- Runner-up: South Korea
- Third place: Belgium

Tournament statistics
- Matches played: 18
- Goals scored: 108 (6 per match)
- Top scorer(s): (Belgium) Jean-Philippe Brulé (South Korea) Lee Jung-Seon (14 goals)
- Best player: (Argentina) Germán Orozco

The 2005 Men's Hockey Champions Challenge took place in Alexandria, Egypt from April 1–9, 2005.

This was the third edition of the tournament under introduced in 2001 by the International Hockey Federation (FIH) to broaden hockey's competitive base globally.

Argentina earned a spot at the 2006 Champions Trophy in Terrassa, Spain after having defeated Korea in the final.

== Squads ==
Argentina

Head Coach: Jorge Ruiz

1. Juan Manuel Vivaldi (GK)
2. Juan Pablo Hourquebie
3. Pedro Ibarra
4. Matías Vila
5. Ezequiel Paulón
6. Mariano Chao (GK)
7. Mario Almada
8. Lucas Rey
9. Tomás Argento
10. Tomás MacCormik
11. Lucas Cammareri
12. Marcos Riccardi
13. Jorge Lombi
14. Fernando Zylberberg
15. Germán Orozco (c)
16. Fernando Oscaris
17. Matías Paredes
18. Facundo Callioni
Belgium

Head Coach: Giles Bonnet

2. Xavier Reckinger
3. Thierry Stumpe
4. Thierry Renaer (c)
6. Loïc Vandeweghe
7. Jean-Philippe Brulé
8. Thomas Van Den Balck
9. Maxime Luycx
11. Charles Vandeweghe
13. Gilles Petre
14. Phillippe Goldberg
17. Manu Leroy (GK)
18. Patrice Houssein
21. Quentin Walravens (GK)
22. Jeremy Schuermans
23. John Goldberg
24. John John Dohmen
27. Amaury De Cock
28. Jérôme Truyens
Egypt

Head Coach: Gerhard Rach

1. Osama Hassanen (GK)
2. Mahmoud Magdi
3. Ahmed Mandour
4. Mahmoud Badawy
5. Hosny El Sayed
6. Mohamed Ibrahim Samak
7. Yassri Abdel Monem (c)
8. Ahmed Wasfi
9. Amro El Sayed
10. Sameh Metwally
11. Sayed El Shahat
12. Karim Abdel Magid
13. Adnan El Sayed
14. Amir El Sayed
15. Tamer El Sayed
16. Tarek El Husseny (GK)
17. Mahmoud Farouk
18. Ahmed Maqsood
England

Head Coach: Jason Lee

2. Andy West
3. Nick Brothers (GK)
4. Glenn Kirkham
5. Richard Alexander
8. James Stedman
9. Mark Pearn
10. Matt Daly
11. Brett Garrard (c)
12. Jonty Clarke
13. Rob Moore
14. Ben Hawes
15. Scott Cordon
16. Matt Taylor
17. Ali Wilson
18. Barry Middleton
19. Jon Brown
20. James Tindall
23. Jon Ebsworth (GK)
South Africa

Head Coach: Paul Revington

1. David Staniforth (GK)
2. Roscoe Katz
3. Ryan Ravenscroft (c)
5. Austin Smith
7. Darryn Gallagher
8. Wayne Madsen
10. Jody Paul
11. Lyall Meyer
12. Gareth Carr
13. Steve Phillips
14. Eric Rose-Innes
15. Andrew Cronje
17. John Paul
19. Franci du Plessis (GK)
20. John McInroy
21. Lungile Tsolekile
22. Ian Symons
South Korea

Head Coach: Cho Myung-Jun

1. Koo Dong-Shik (GK)
2. Cha Jong-Bok
3. Kim Joung-Goo
4. Son Byung-Sik
5. Han Hyung-Bae (c)
6. Lee Nam-Yong
7. Seo Jong-Ho
8. Kang Seong-Jung
9. Yoon Sung-Hoon
10. You Hyo-Sik
11. Lee Jung-Seon
12. Kim Sam-Seok
13. Oh Dae-Keun
14. Kim Byung-Hoon
16. Shin Yong-Ho (GK)
17. Lee Sung-Min
18. Hwang In-Nam

== Umpires ==
Below is the eight umpires appointed by International Hockey Federation (FIH):

- Roberto Curti (ITA)
- Pete Elders (NED)
- Colin Hutchinson (IRL)
- Kim Hong-Lae (KOR)
- Satinder Kumar (IND)
- Nick Lockhart (ENG)
- Deon Nel (RSA)
- Syed Ab de Rady (EGY)

== Results ==
All times are Eastern European Time (UTC+02:00)

=== Pool ===
Pos	Team	Pld	W	D	L	GF	GA	GD	Pts	Qualification
1	South Korea	5	4	1	0	22	9	+13	13	Final
2	Argentina	5	3	2	0	20	11	+9	11	Final
3	Belgium	5	2	2	1	20	12	+8	8	Third Place Match
4	England	5	2	1	2	13	13	0	7	Third Place Match
5	South Africa	5	1	0	4	9	16	−7	3	Fifth Place Match
6	Egypt (H)	5	0	0	5	4	27	−23	0	Fifth Place Match

Source: FIH
Rules for classification: 1) points; 2) goal difference; 3) goals scored; 4) head-to-head result.
(H) Hosts

1 April 2005
16:00

South Korea	3–3	Argentina
Lee J. 32', 34'; Yoon 46'	Report	Almada 20', 54'; M. Vila 57'

Umpires:
Roberto Curti (ITA)
Nick Lockhart (ENG)

1 April 2005
18:15

South Africa	1–5	Belgium
Symons 18'	Report	C. Vandeweghe 2'; Brulé 9', 14'; L. Vandeweghe 23'; Truyens 26'

Umpires:
Peter Elders (NED)
Colin Hutchinson (IRL)

1 April 2005
20:30

Egypt	1–4	England
Metwally 46'	Report	Tindall 29'; Middleton 43'; Daly 55'; Kirkham 69'

Umpires:
Satinder Kumar (IND)
Deon Nel (RSA)

2 April 2005
16:15

Argentina	4–2	South Africa
Oscaris 38'; M. Vila 40'; Riccardi 54'; Hourquebie 56'	Report	McInroy 1'; Carr 65'

Umpires:
Nick Lockhart (ENG)
Satinder Kumar (IND)

2 April 2005
18:30

England	2–5	South Korea
Pearn 46'; Middleton 65'	Report	Lee J. 21', 45', 57'; Kang 50'; Son 66'

Umpires:
Peter Elders (NED)
Syed Ab del Rady (EGY)

2 April 2005
20:30

Belgium	7–0	Egypt
Reckinger 13', 45'; Luycx 17'; P. Goldberg 23'; Brulé 26', 40'; C. Vandeweghe 61'	Report

Umpires:
Roberto Curti (ITA)
Kim Hong-Lae (KOR)

4 April 2005
16:00

South Korea	6–3	Belgium
You 3'; Lee J. 6', 44', 46'; Yoon 8', 48'	Report	Brulé 2'; Truyens 18'; Luycx 65'

Umpires:
Deon Nel (RSA)
Nick Lockhart (ENG)

4 April 2005
18:15

England	2–3	Argentina
Tindall 8'; Kirkham 40'	Report	Paredes 6'; Lombi 13', 30'

Umpires:
Kim Hong-Lae (KOR)
Peter Elders (NED)

4 April 2005
18:15

South Africa	4–1	Egypt
Meyer 5'; Phillips 9'; Symons 26', 35'	Report	Magdi 44'

Umpires:
Roberto Curti (ITA)
Colin Hutchinson (IRL)

5 April 2005
16:00

Belgium	2–2	England
Brulé 31', 48'	Report	Tindall 20'; Daly 23'

Umpires:
Deon Nel (RSA)
Satinder Kumar (IND)

5 April 2005
18:15

South Korea	3–0	South Africa
Lee J. 32'; Yoon 39'; Kim J. 50'	Report

Umpires:
Syed Ab del Rady (EGY)
Nick Lockhart (ENG)

5 April 2005
20:30

Egypt	1–7	Argentina
Amr 28'	Report	Lombi 1', 11', 41'; M. Vila 33', 38'; Zylberberg 44'; Almada 60'

Umpires:
Peter Elders (NED)
Colin Hutchinson (IRL)

8 April 2005
16:00

England	3–2	South Africa
Daly 5', 8'; Moore 64'	Report	Meyer 31'; Symons 58'

Umpires:
Syed Ab del Rady (EGY)
Satinder Kumar (IND)

8 April 2005
18:15

Argentina	3–3	Belgium
Almada 10'; Lombi 28'; Paredes 39'	Report	Brulé 25', 61'; L. Vandeweghe 67'

Umpires:
Roberto Curti (ITA)
Kim Hong-Lae (KOR)

8 April 2005
20:30

Egypt	1–5	South Korea
Maqsood 36'	Report	Seo 7'; Lee J. 14', 53', 69'; Yoon 59'

Umpires:
Colin Hutchinson (IRL)
Deon Nel (RSA)

=== Classification ===
==== Fifth and sixth place ====
9 April 2005
15:30

South Africa	5–2	Egypt
Symons 16', 25'; Phillips 29', 40'; Tsolekile 49'	Report	Farouk 64'; Metwally 68'

Umpires:
Nick Lockhart (ENG)
Kim Hong-Lae (KOR)

==== Third and fourth place ====
9 April 2005
18:00

Belgium	6–5	England
Brulé 8', 31', 53', 61', 68'; Goldberg 13'	Report	Daly 23', 60'; Hawes 35'; Clarke 49'; Pearn 69'

Umpires:
Colin Hutchinson (IRL)
Deon Nel (RSA)

==== Final ====
9 April 2005
20:30

South Korea	2–5	Argentina
Lee J. 48', 60'	Report	Lombi 7', 15', 45', 59'; Orozco 65'

Umpires:
Roberto Curti (ITA)
Peter Elders (NED)

== Awards ==
- Top Scorers
  - (Belgium) Jean-Philippe Brulé
  - (South Korea) Lee Jung-Seon
- Player of the Tournament
  - (Argentina) Germán Orozco

== Final rankings ==
As per statistical convention in field hockey, matches decided in extra time are counted as wins and losses, while matches decided by penalty shoot-outs are counted as draws.

Pos	Team	Pld	W	D	L	GF	GA	GD	Pts	Qualification
1st place, gold medalist(s)	Argentina	6	4	2	0	25	13	+12	14	Qualified for 2006 Champions Trophy
2nd place, silver medalist(s)	South Korea	6	4	1	1	24	14	+10	13	
3rd place, bronze medalist(s)	Belgium	6	3	2	1	26	17	+9	11	
4	England	6	2	1	3	18	19	−1	7	
5	South Africa	6	2	0	4	14	18	−4	6	
6	Egypt (H)	6	0	0	6	6	32	−26	0	

Source: FIH
(H) Hosts

== Goalscorers ==
There were 113 goals scored in 18 matches, for an average of 6.28 goals per match.

14 goals

- (Belgium) Jean-Philippe Brulé
- (South Korea) Lee Jung-seon

10 goals

- (Argentina) Jorge Lombi

6 goals

- (England) Matthew Daly
- (South Africa) Ian Symons

5 goals

- (South Korea) Yoon Sung-hoon

4 goals

- (Argentina) Mario Almada
- (Argentina) Matías Vila

3 goals

- (England) James Tindall
- (South Africa) Steven Phillips

2 goals

- (Argentina) Matías Paredes
- (Belgium) Maxime Luycx
- (Belgium) Xavier Reckinger
- (Belgium) Jérôme Truyens
- (Belgium) Charles Vandeweghe
- (Belgium) Loic Vandeweghe
- (Egypt) Sameh Metwally
- (England) Glenn Kirkham
- (England) Barry Middleton
- (England) Mark Pearn
- (South Africa) Lyall Meyer

1 goal

- (Argentina) Juan Pablo Hourquebie
- (Argentina) Germán Orozco
- (Argentina) Fernando Oscaris
- (Argentina) Marcos Riccardi
- (Argentina) Fernando Zylberberg
- (Belgium) John Goldberg
- (Belgium) Philippe Goldberg
- (Egypt) Amr El Sayed
- (Egypt) Mahmoud Farouk
- (Egypt) Mahmoud Magdi
- (Egypt) Ahmed Maqsood
- (England) Jonathan Clarke
- (England) Benjamin Hawes
- (England) Robert Moore
- (South Africa) Gareth Carr
- (South Africa) John McInroy
- (South Africa) Lungile Tsolekile
- (South Korea) Kang Seong-jung
- (South Korea) Kim Joung-goo
- (South Korea) Seo Jong-ho
- (South Korea) Son Byung-sik
- (South Korea) You Hyo-sik
