= 2001 Men's Hockey Champions Challenge =

Field hockey tournament

Tournament details
- Host country: Malaysia
- City: Kuala Lumpur
- Dates: 7–15 December
- Teams: 6 (from 4 confederations)
- Venue: Malaysia National Hockey Stadium

Final positions
- Champions: India (1st title)
- Runner-up: South Africa
- Third place: Argentina

Tournament statistics
- Matches played: 18
- Goals scored: 64 (3.56 per match)
- Top scorer: (Argentina) Jorge Lombi (7 goals)
- Best player: (South Africa) Mike Cullen

The 2001 Men's Hockey Champions Challenge took place in Kuala Lumpur, Malaysia from 7 to 15 December 2001.

This was the inaugural tournament under introduced by the International Hockey Federation (FIH) to broaden hockey's competitive base globally.

Participating nations were Argentina, Belgium, host Malaysia, India, Japan, and South Africa. The winner earned a spot at the 2002 Champions Trophy in Cologne, Germany.

India defeated South Africa 2–1 in the final to win the competition.

== Squads ==
Argentina

Head Coach: Jorge Ruiz

1. Pablo Moreira (GK / C)
2. Juan Pablo Hourquebie
3. Maximiliano Caldas
4. Matias Vila
5. Ezequiel Paulón
7. Mario Almada
10. Tomás MacCormik
11. Santiago Capurro
12. Marcos Riccardi
13. Jorge Lombi
14. Fernando Zylberberg
15. Germán Orozco
16. Fernando Oscaris
17. Matias Paredes
19. Juan Manuel Vivaldi (GK)
23. Leonardo Deambarsi
Belgium
1. Vincent Deneumostier (GK)
2. Maxime Luycx
3. Jean-Philippe Brulé
4. Thierry Renaer
5. Xavier-Charles Letier
6. Xavier de Scheemaeker
7. Joeri Beunen
8. Thomas van den Balck
9. Xavier Brooke
10. Robin Geens
12. Christophe Moraux (GK)
15. Marc Coudron (C)
17. Fabian Bueger
20. Xavier Reckinger
22. Charles Vandeweghe
23. Phillippe Goldberg
India

Head Coach: Cedric d'Souza

1. Devesh Chauhan (GK)
5. Lazarus Barla
6. Thirumal Valavan
8. Sukhbir Singh Gill
9. Dhanraj Pillay
10. Baljit Singh Dhillon (C)
11. Prabhjot Singh
12. Jude Menezes (GK)
14. Jugraj Singh
15. Daljit Singh Dhillon
20. Kanwalpreet Singh
21. Arjun Halappa
22. Deepak Thakur
24. Bipin Fernandez
27. Vikram Pillay
32. Gagan Ajit Singh
Japan
1. Takahiko Yamabori (C)
2. Naoya Iwadate
5. Ryuji Furasato
6. Akira Takahashi
7. Kenichi Katayama
8. Naohiko Tobita
9. Kazuyuki Ozawa
10. Atsushi Takehara
11. Daisuke Hokaze
12. Akihiko Hirata
14. Mitsuru Ito
15. Jun Takahashi (GK)
16. Yasuhiro Nobui (GK)
18. Ryuhie Harada
20. Fumihiro Matsui
22. Toshiai Fukuda
Malaysia

Head Coach: Paul Lissek

1. Roslan Jamaluddin (GK)
2. Singh Maninderijt
3. Chua Boon Huat
4. Gobinathan Krishnamurthy
5. Kuhan Shanmuganathan
6. Nor Azlan Bakar
7. Chairil Anwar Abdul Aziz
9. Mohammed Madzli Ikmar
10. Tajol Rosli Mohamed
11. Mohamed Rodhanizam Radzi
12. Keevan Raj Kalikavandan
13. Mirnawan Nawawi
14. Logan Kali Kavandan
16. Ibrahim Mohd Nasihin Nubli
18. Shankar Shanmugam
South Africa

Head Coach: Rob Pullen

1. Chris Hibbert (GK)
3. Warren Bond
4. Craig Jackson (C)
5. Craig Fulton
6. Bruce Jacobs
8. Gareth Murray
10. Mike Cullen
11. Clyde Abrahams
12. Justin King
14. Ken Forbes
15. Kevin Chree
16. Brenton Key
17. Darryn Gallagher
22. David Staniforth (GK)
26. Denzil Dolley
27. Marvin Bam

== Results ==
=== Pool ===
Pos	Team	Pld	W	D	L	GF	GA	GD	Pts	Qualification
1	India	5	3	1	1	9	5	+4	10	Final
2	South Africa	5	3	1	1	9	7	+2	10	Final
3	Argentina	5	3	0	2	10	8	+2	9	Third place game
4	Malaysia (H)	5	3	0	2	6	4	+2	9	Third place game
5	Japan	5	2	0	3	10	10	0	6	Fifth place game
6	Belgium	5	0	0	5	3	13	−10	0	Fifth place game

Source: FIH
(H) Hosts

7 December 2001
16:05

South Africa	3 – 2	Argentina
King 16'; Cullen 69', 70'	Report	Lombi 11'; Almada 59'

Umpires:
Antonio Bustos (ESP)
Jason McCracken (NZL)

7 December 2001
18:05

India	1 – 0	Belgium
Pillay 47'	Report

Umpires:
Steve Graham (WAL)
Singh Ravinderpal (MAS)

7 December 2001
20:05

Malaysia	1 – 0	Japan
Raj 40'	Report

Umpires:
Satinder Kumar (IND)
Sumesh Putra (CAN)

8 December 2001
18:05

South Africa	2 – 2	India
King 11'; Fulton 60'	Report	J. Singh 9'; Thakur 17'

Umpires:
Sumesh Putra (CAN)
Singh Paramjit (MAS)

8 December 2001
20:05

Belgium	0 – 2	Malaysia

9 December 2001
18:05

Japan	1 – 2	Argentina

10 December 2001
16:05

Japan	3 – 2	South Africa
Furasato 25'; Yamabori 51'; Tobita 58'	Report	Cullen 8'; King 43'

Umpires:
Antonio Bustos (ESP)
Singh Ravinderpal (MAS)

10 December 2001
18:05

Argentina	3 – 1	Belgium
Almada 5', 51'; Capurro 11'	Report	Bueger 18'

Umpires:
Singh Paramjit (MAS)
Toschimichi Fujimura (JPN)

10 December 2001
20:05

Malaysia	2 – 1	India
Chua Boon Huat 47'; Raj 55'	Report	P. Singh 23'

Umpires:
Jason McCracken (NZL)
Steve Graham (WAL)

11 December 2001
18:05

Belgium	0 – 1	South Africa
	Report	Jacobs 51'

Umpires:
Jason McCracken (NZL)
Satinder Kumar (IND)

12 December 2001
18:05

India	3 – 0	Japan
Thakur 35', 62'; P. Singh 41'	Report

Umpires:
Singh Paramjit (MAS)
Antonio Bustos (ESP)

12 December 2001
20:05

Malaysia	1 – 2	Argentina
L. Raj 19'	Report	Lombi 46', 69'

Umpires:
Steve Graham (WAL)
Sumesh Putra (CAN)

13 December 2001
16:05

Japan	6 – 2	Belgium
Katayama 6'; Matsui 41'; Tobita 44', 60'; Furasato 49'; Iwadate 62'	Report	Brulé 8', 40'

Umpires:
Blalse Monteiro (IND)
Satinder Kumar (IND)

13 December 2001
18:05

India	2 – 1	Argentina
J. Singh 27'; G. Singh 32'	Report	MacCormik 15'

Umpires:
Steve Graham (WAL)
Singh Ravinderpal (MAS)

13 December 2001
20:05

South Africa	1 – 0	Malaysia
Cullen 41'	Report

Umpires:
Jason McCracken (NZL)
Sumesh Putra (CAN)

=== Classification ===
==== Fifth place game ====
15 December 2001
08:05

Japan	5 – 3	Belgium
Katayama 1'; Matsui 8', 37'; Yamabori 53'; Furasato 61'	Report	Reckinger 28'; Beunen 39'; Geens 42'

Umpires:
Blalse Monteiro (IND)
Singh Ravinderpal (MAS)

==== Third place game ====
15 December 2001
08:05

Argentina	4 – 2	Malaysia
Lombi 7', 24', 31', 59'	Report	Chairil 45'; Mohd Madzli Ikmar 50'

Umpires:
Toschimichi Fujimura (JPN)
Jason McCracken (NZL)

==== Final ====
15 December 2001
20:05

India	2 – 1	South Africa
Thakur 9'; Dillon 55'	Report	Dolley 58'

Umpires:
Steve Graham (WAL)
Sumesh Putra (CAN)

== Statistics ==
=== Final ranking ===
1. India
2. South Africa
3. Argentina
4. Malaysia
5. Japan
6. Belgium

=== Awards ===
Topscorer	Best Player	Fair Play Trophy
(Argentina) Jorge Lombi	(South Africa) Mike Cullen	Japan

== See also ==
- 2001 Men's Hockey Champions Trophy
