= 2004 Men's Pan American Cup =

International field hockey competition

Tournament details
- Host country: Canada
- City: London
- Dates: 12–23 May
- Teams: 11 (from 1 confederation)
- Venue: TD Waterhouse Stadium

Final positions
- Champions: Argentina (1st title)
- Runner-up: Canada
- Third place: Chile

Tournament statistics
- Matches played: 35
- Goals scored: 240 (6.86 per match)
- Top scorer: (Argentina) Jorge Lombi (26 goals)
- Best player: (Trinidad and Tobago) Kwandwane Browne

The 2004 Men's Pan American Cup was the second edition of the Men's Pan American Cup, the quadrennial men's international field hockey championship of the Americas organized by the Pan American Hockey Federation. It was held between 12 and 23 May 2004 in London, Ontario, Canada. The tournament doubled as the qualifier to the 2006 World Cup to be held in Mönchengladbach, Germany. The winner would qualify directly while the runner-up would have the chance to obtain one of five berths at the World Cup Qualifier in Changzhou, China.

Argentina won the tournament for the first time after defeating Canada 2–1 in the final, earning an automatic berth at the 2006 World Cup.

== Teams ==
- Argentina
- Brazil
- Canada
- Chile
- ~~Cuba~~ (withdrew)
- Mexico
- Netherlands Antilles
- Puerto Rico
- Trinidad and Tobago
- Uruguay
- United States
- Venezuela

== Umpires ==
Below are the 13 umpires appointed by the Pan American Hockey Federation:

- Gianluca Caredda (BRA)
- Roberto Curti (ITA)
- John Hrytsak (CAN)
- Anthony Kelleher (ENG)
- Jason King (BAR)
- Daniel López (URU)
- Andrew Mair (SCO)
- Albert Marcano (TRI)
- Javier Palomo (MEX)
- Daniel Santi (ARG)
- Steve Simpson (USA)
- Gus Soteriades (USA)
- Chris Wilson (CAN)

== Results ==
All times are Eastern Daylight Time (UTC−04:00)

=== First round ===
==== Pool A ====
Pos	Team	Pld	W	D	L	GF	GA	GD	Pts	Qualification
1	Argentina	5	5	0	0	58	1	+57	15	Semi-finals
2	Chile	5	4	0	1	30	5	+25	12	Semi-finals
3	United States	5	3	0	2	31	10	+21	9	5–8th place semi-finals
4	Puerto Rico	5	1	1	3	6	39	−33	4	5–8th place semi-finals
5	Brazil	5	1	1	3	5	42	−37	4	Ninth place game
6	Venezuela	5	0	0	5	5	38	−33	0	7–9th place semi-final

Source: PAHF

12 May 2004
08:00

Argentina	16–0	Venezuela
Garreta 2'; Lombi 8', 12', 21', 40', 43', 46', 48', 60', 63', 64'; Almada 20'; Zylberberg 31'; Rey 37'; R. Vila 44'; MacCormik 68'	Report

Umpires:
Anthony Kelleher (ENG)
Daniel López (URU)

12 May 2004
10:00

Chile	10–0	Puerto Rico
Montegu 1', 5', 43', 52'; Koppenberger 5'; Kühlenthal 14'; Rodríguez 55', 61'; Amoroso 57'; O'Rayn 70'	Report

Umpires:
Chris Wilson (CAN)
Javier Palomo (MEX)

12 May 2004
12:00

United States	10–1	Brazil
Scally 20'; Harris 22', 55'; Sandhu 25'; Nakamura 34', 42', 51', 57'; Martin 40'; Badhesha 67'	Report	O. Hock 32'

Umpires:
Albert Marcano (TRI)
John Hrytsak (CAN)

13 May 2004
08:00

Venezuela	1–6	Chile
J. I. Puzo 33'	Report	O'Rayn 5', 26'; Montegu 25', 62', 70'; Casellas 46'

Umpires:
Albert Marcano (TRI)
Jason King (BAR)

13 May 2004
10:00

Puerto Rico	1–11	United States
Lastra Serrano 40'	Report	Sandhu 6', 8'; Nakamura 15', 41', 47'; Kundi 20'; Martin 23', 37', 60'; Jordan 54'; Harris 55'

Umpires:
Andrew Mair (SCO)
Javier Palomo (MEX)

13 May 2004
12:00

Brazil	0–20	Argentina
	Report	Capurro 17', 49', 58', 60'; Lombi 22', 24', 41', 44', 54'; M. Vila 23', 34', 50'; Almada 36', 39', 53', 57'; Zylberberg 46'; R. Vila 52'; Garreta 62', 69'

Umpires:
Chris Wilson (CAN)
John Hrytsak (CAN)

15 May 2004
15:00

Argentina	2–0	Chile
Garreta 38'; Almada 61'	Report

Umpires:
Roberto Curti (ITA)
Albert Marcano (TRI)

15 May 2004
17:00

United States	8–0	Venezuela
Martin 13', 15'; Harris 18', 33', 58'; D. Kainth 46'; Cota 57'; Nakamura 70'	Report

Umpires:
Anthony Kelleher (ENG)
Jason King (BAR)

15 May 2004
19:00

Puerto Rico	0–0	Brazil
	Report

Umpires:
John Hrytsak (CAN)
Daniel López (URU)

16 May 2004
15:00

United States	1–6	Argentina
Harris 69'	Report	Lombi 9', 52'; M. Vila 25', 32'; Almada 28', 61'

Umpires:
John Hrytsak (CAN)
Andrew Mair (SCO)

16 May 2004
17:00

Chile	12–1	Brazil
O'Rayn 14', 59'; Wagner 17', 41', 44'; Casanova 21'; Koppenberger 23', 58'; Thiermann 28'; Kühlenthal 33'; Montegu 49', 67'	Report	Burton 5'

Umpires:
Chris Wilson (CAN)
Anthony Kelleher (ENG)

16 May 2004
19:00

Venezuela	4–5	Puerto Rico
Piccioli 17', 53', 64'; Pardi 35'	Report	Lastra Serrano 10', 29', 69'; Martínez Morales 31', 65'

Umpires:
Daniel Santi (ARG) ()
Javier Palomo (MEX)

18 May 2004
08:00

Chile	2–1	United States
Montegu 12'; Koppenberger 29'	Report	Harris 60'

Umpires:
Daniel Santi (ARG)
Andrew Mair (SCO)

18 May 2004
12:00

Brazil	3–0	Venezuela
Lemos 24'; G. Hock 39'; Berthold 43'	Report

Umpires:
Albert Marcano (TRI)
Javier Palomo (MEX)

18 May 2004
17:00

Argentina	14–0	Puerto Rico
MacCormik 2'; M. Vila 6', 8', 11', 46'; Lombi 19', 47', 70'; Almada 22'; Paredes 24'; Oscaris 33'; Capurro 40', 68'; Garreta 44'	Report

Umpires:
Gus Soteriades (USA)
Daniel López (URU)

==== Pool B ====
Pos	Team	Pld	W	D	L	GF	GA	GD	Pts	Qualification
1	Canada (H)	4	4	0	0	24	1	+23	12	Semi-finals
2	Trinidad and Tobago	4	3	0	1	18	7	+11	9	Semi-finals
3	Netherlands Antilles	4	2	0	2	8	12	−4	6	5–8th place semi-finals
4	Mexico	4	1	0	3	7	13	−6	3	5–8th place semi-finals
5	Uruguay	4	0	0	4	1	25	−24	0	7–9th place semi-final

Source: PAHF
(H) Hosts

12 May 2004
16:00

Canada	3–0	Trinidad and Tobago
R. Short 20', 41'; Grimes 29'	Report

Umpires:
Gus Soteriades (USA)
Gianluca Caredda (BRA)

12 May 2004
20:00

Mexico	0–2	Netherlands Antilles
	Report	Overgaauw 41', 49'

Umpires:
Andrew Mair (SCO)
Daniel Santi (ARG)

13 May 2004
18:00

Uruguay	0–5	Mexico
	Report	Moreno 10', 12'; Márquez 19'; Gómez 43'; Cuevas 47'

Umpires:
Anthony Kelleher (ENG)
Gus Soteriades (USA)

13 May 2004
20:00

Netherlands Antilles	1–8	Canada
Overgaauw 70'	Report	Grimes 16'; Jameson 21'; Kahlon 23'; R. Short 29', 36', 39', 69'; Fernandes 51'

Umpires:
Steve Simpson (USA)
Roberto Curti (ITA)

15 May 2004
09:00

Netherlands Antilles	4–0	Uruguay
Overgaauw 15', 23', 59' van Stapele 58'	Report

Umpires:
Andrew Mair (SCO)
Gianluca Caredda (BRA)

15 May 2004
11:30

Mexico	2–5	Trinidad and Tobago
Gómez 43'; Cuevas 49'	Report	Browne 13', 18', 21', 31'; Wren 43'

Umpires:
Santi Daniel (ARG)
Steve Simpson (USA)

16 May 2004
09:00

Trinidad and Tobago	9–1	Uruguay
Browne 7', 22', 32', 44', 58'; Whittington 23'; Quan Chan 28', 55'; Gilke 62'	Report	Castillo 60'

Umpires:
Gus Soteriades (USA)
Jason King (BAR)

16 May 2004
12:00

Canada	6–0	Mexico
R. Short 24'; Bath 29'; Jameson 35'; Fernandes 46'; Grimes 48', 58'	Report

Umpires:
Roberto Curti (ITA)
Gianluca Careda (BRA)

18 May 2004
10:00

Trinidad and Tobago	4–1	Netherlands Antilles
Quan Chan 27', 51'; Garcia 52', 62'	Report	van de Braak 64'

Umpires:
Roberto Curti (ITA)
Chris Wilson (CAN)

18 May 2004
19:00

Uruguay	0–7	Canada
	Report	Fernandes 6', 10', 11'; Wettlaufer 20'; Pereira 35'; Lee 58'; Grimes 69'

Umpires:
Steve Simpson (USA)
Jason King (BAR)

=== Ninth to eleventh place classification ===
7–9th place semi-final
20 May
Venezuela	1 (2)
Uruguay (p.s.)	1 (3)

Ninth place
22 May
Brazil	1 (2)
Uruguay (p.s.)	1 (4)

==== 7–9th place semi-final ====
20 May 2004
18:00

Venezuela	1–1	Uruguay
Piccioli 21'	Report	Cornalino 11'
Penalties
Figueroa (penalty shoot-out scored); Pardi (penalty shoot-out scored); J. I. Puzo (penalty shoot-out missed); W. Lehrmann (penalty shoot-out missed); Piccioli (penalty shoot-out missed)	2–3	(penalty shoot-out missed) N. Tixe; (penalty shoot-out scored) Golina; (penalty shoot-out scored) Segarde; (penalty shoot-out missed) Pérez; (penalty shoot-out scored) Castillo

Umpires:
Gianluca Caredda (ITA)
Jason King (BAR)

==== Ninth place game ====
22 May 2004
12:00

Brazil	1–1	Uruguay
Burton 63'	Report	Pérez 19'
Penalties
Réus (penalty shoot-out missed); Sauerbronn (penalty shoot-out missed) de Grandi (penalty shoot-out scored); O. Hock (penalty shoot-out scored)	2–4	(penalty shoot-out scored) Draper; (penalty shoot-out scored) Golina; (penalty shoot-out scored) Segarde; (penalty shoot-out scored) N. Tixe

Umpires:
John Hrytsak (CAN)
Gus Soteriades (USA)

=== Fifth to eighth place classification ===
5–8th place semi-finals
21 May
United States	0
Mexico	2
21 May
Puerto Rico	2
Netherlands Antilles	5

Fifth place
22 May
Mexico	0
Netherlands Antilles	2
Seventh place
22 May
United States	11
Puerto Rico	0

==== 5–8th place semi-finals ====
21 May 2004
10:00

United States	0–2	Mexico
	Report	Gómez 41'; Chávez 70+'

Umpires:
Chris Wilson (CAN)
Daniel López (URU)

21 May 2004
12:30

Puerto Rico	2–5	Netherlands Antilles
Rodríguez Cartagena 10', 48'	Report	Overgaauw 8', 30', 34'; Plantenga 53' de Gier 62'

Umpires:
Javier Palomo (MEX)
Daniel Santi (ARG)

==== Seventh place game ====
22 May 2004
15:00

United States	11–0	Puerto Rico
Harris 6', 46'; Martin 11', 14', 28'; Hindy 18'; Nakamura 32', 52'; Jordan 53'; Kundi 62'; Sandhu 70'	Report

Umpires:
Anthony Kelleher (ENG)
Javier Palomo (MEX)

==== Fifth place game ====
22 May 2004
17:30

Mexico	0–2	Netherlands Antilles
	Report	Overgaauw 28', 49'

Umpires:
Steve Simpson (USA)
Daniel López (URU)

=== First to fourth place classification ===
Semi-finals
21 May
Chile	2
Canada	4
21 May
Argentina	8
Trinidad and Tobago	1

Final
23 May
Canada	1
Argentina	2
Third place
23 May
Chile	2
Trinidad and Tobago	1

==== Semi-finals ====
21 May 2004
15:00

Chile	2–4	Canada
Kühlenthal 24'; Montegu 52'	Report	R. Short 14'; Grimes 28', 31'; Fernandes 48'

Umpires:
Roberto Curti (ITA)
Albert Marcano (TRI)

21 May 2004
17:30

Argentina	8–1	Trinidad and Tobago
Lombi 15', 24', 46', 51', 59'; Garreta 21'; M. Vila 66'; Paredes 69'	Report	Browne 70+'

Umpires:
Anthony Kelleher (ENG)
Gus Soteriades (USA)

==== Third place game ====
23 May 2004
10:00

Chile	2–1	Trinidad and Tobago
Montegu 26', 43'	Report	Browne 14'

Umpires:
Chris Wilson (CAN)
Daniel Santi (ARG)

==== Final ====
23 May 2004
12:30

Canada	1–2	Argentina
Grimes 69'	Report	Lombi 9'; MacCormik 34'

Umpires:
Andrew Mair (SCO)
Roberto Curti (ITA)

== Statistics ==
=== Final standings ===
Pos	Team	Qualification
1	Argentina	2006 World Cup
2	Canada (H)	2006 Intercontinental Cup
3	Chile	
4	Trinidad and Tobago	
5	Netherlands Antilles	
6	Mexico	
7	United States	
8	Puerto Rico	
9	Uruguay	
10	Brazil	
11	Venezuela	

Source: PAHF
(H) Host

=== Awards ===
Top Goalscorer	Player of the Tournament	Goalkeeper of the Tournament
(Argentina) Jorge Lombi	(Trinidad and Tobago) Kwandwane Browne	(Chile) Mathias Andwandter

=== Goalscorers ===
There were 240 goals scored in 35 matches, for an average of 6.86 goals per match.

26 goals

- (Argentina) Jorge Lombi

13 goals

- (Chile) Felipe Montegu

11 goals

- (Netherlands Antilles) Jaap Overgaauw
- (Trinidad and Tobago) Kwandwane Browne

10 goals

- (Argentina) Matías Vila
- (United States) Patrick Harris
- (United States) Shawn Nakamura

9 goals

- (Argentina) Mario Almada
- (United States) Jarred Martin

8 goals

- (Canada) Connor Grimes
- (Canada) Rob Short

6 goals

- (Argentina) Santiago Capurro
- (Argentina) Juan Eduardo Garreta
- (Canada) Wayne Fernandes

5 goals

- (Chile) Jorge O'Rayn

4 goals

- (Chile) Ian Koppenberger
- (Puerto Rico) Pedro Lastra Serrano
- (Trinidad and Tobago) Dwain Quan Chan
- (United States) Ramandeer Sandhu
- (Venezuela) Lucas Piccioli

3 goals

- (Argentina) Tomás MacCormik
- (Chile) Pablo Kühlenthal
- (Chile) Rodrigo Wagner
- (Mexico) Jorge Gomez

2 goals

- (Argentina) Matías Paredes
- (Argentina) Rodrigo Vila
- (Argentina) Fernando Zylberberg
- (Brazil) Hugo Burton
- (Canada) David Jameson
- (Chile) Cristobal Rodriguez
- (Mexico) Aaron Cuevas
- (Mexico) Pol Moreno
- (Puerto Rico) Jose Martinez Morales
- (Puerto Rico) Jaime Rodriguez Cartagena
- (Trinidad and Tobago) Brian Garcia
- (United States) Daniel Jordan
- (United States) Gurpal Kundi

1 goal

- (Argentina) Fernando Oscaris
- (Argentina) Lucas Rey
- (Brazil) Guillermo Berthold
- (Brazil) Guido Hock
- (Brazil) Oliver Hock
- (Brazil) Leonardo Lemos
- (Canada) Jeewanjot Bath
- (Canada) Ravi Kahlon
- (Canada) Michael Lee
- (Canada) Ken Pereira
- (Canada) Paul Wettlaufer
- (Chile) Matias Amoroso
- (Chile) Felipe Casanova
- (Chile) Esteban Krainz
- (Chile) Alfredo Thiermann
- (Mexico) Jaime Chavez
- (Mexico) Marcos Marquez
- (Netherlands Antilles) Tjerk van de Braak
- (Netherlands Antilles) Jasper de Gier
- (Netherlands Antilles) Wouter Plantenga
- (Netherlands Antilles) Dolph van Stapele
- (Trinidad and Tobago) Dilet Gilkes
- (Trinidad and Tobago) Atiba Whittington
- (Trinidad and Tobago) Nicolas Wren
- (Uruguay) Sebastien Castillo
- (Uruguay) Juan Cornalino
- (Uruguay) Jorge Perez
- (United States) Jang Badhesha
- (United States) Patrick Cota
- (United States) Shawn Hindy
- (United States) Daraspreet Kainth
- (United States) Ian Scally
- (Venezuela) Homero Pardi
- (Venezuela) José Ignacio Puzo

== See also ==
- 2004 Women's Pan American Cup
