= Juan Manuel Vivaldi =

Argentine field hockey player

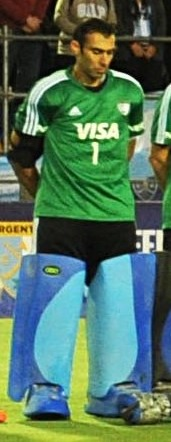

Personal information
- Born: 17 July 1979 (age 47) Buenos Aires, Argentina
- Height: 1.80 m (5 ft 11 in)
- Weight: 80 kg (176 lb)

Sport
- Sport: Field hockey
- Position: Goalkeeper
- Club: Banco Provincia
Senior career
| Years | Team | Caps | Goals |
| – | Banco Provincia | - | - |
National team
| Years | Team | Caps | Goals |
| 2001–2021 | Argentina | 288 | (0) |
Medal record
Olympic Games
| Gold medal – first place | 2016 Rio de Janeiro | Team |
World Cup
| Bronze medal – third place | 2014 The Hague |
Pan American Games
| Gold medal – first place | 2011 Guadalajara | Team |
| Gold medal – first place | 2015 Toronto | Team |
| Gold medal – first place | 2019 Lima | Team |
| Silver medal – second place | 2007 Rio de Janeiro | Team |
Pan American Cup
| Gold medal – first place | 2013 Brampton |
| Gold medal – first place | 2017 Lancaster |
Champions Trophy
| Bronze medal – third place | 2008 Rotterdam |
Champions Challenge
| Gold medal – first place | 2005 Alexandria |
| Gold medal – first place | 2007 Boom |
| Bronze medal – third place | 2001 Kuala Lumpur |
World League
| Silver medal – second place | 2016–17 Bhubaneswar | Team |
South American Games
| Gold medal – first place | 2014 Santiago | Team |

Juan Manuel Vivaldi (born 17 July 1979) is an Argentine field hockey goalkeeper who played club hockey for Club Banco de la Provincia de Buenos Aires. He was a member of the men's national team from 2001 to 2021 with over 300 caps.

He was the stand-in for first choice goalie Pablo Moreira at the 2004 Summer Olympics in Athens, where the South Americans finished in 11th position. Vivaldi was also on the side that ended up fifth at the 2003 Champions Trophy in Amstelveen and won the 2005 Champions Challenge tournament in Alexandria, Egypt.

He was part of the Argentine team that finished in 10th position at the 2012 Summer Olympics. He played for the Argentine team that won the bronze medal at the 2014 Men's Hockey World Cup, beating England in the bronze medal playoff.

He was the starting goalie in the 2016 Summer Olympics where he won the Gold medal after defeating Belgium 4–2 in the Final.

Juan Manuel has also won three medals at the Pan American Games and two Champions Challenge. In July 2019, he was selected in the Argentina squad for the 2019 Pan American Games. They won the gold medal by defeating Canada 5–2 in the final.
