= Zylberberg =

Zylberberg is a surname. Notable people with the surname include:

- Fernando Zylberberg (born 1977), Argentine field hockey player
- Julieta Zylberberg (born 1983), Argentine actress
- Régine Zylberberg (1929 - 2022), French singer
- Joel Hyatt Zylberberg (born 1950), American entrepreneur and politician
