= David Staniforth =

David Staniforth may refer to:

- David Staniforth (field hockey) (born 1976), South African hockey player
- David Staniforth (footballer) (born 1950), English footballer
