= Germán Orozco =

Argentine field hockey player

Personal information
- Born: 16 January 1976 (age 50) Buenos Aires, Argentina
- Height: 1.76 m (5 ft 9 in)
- Weight: 74 kg (163 lb)

Sport
- Sport: Field hockey
- Position: Defender
National team
Years	Team	Caps	Goals
1994–2007	Argentina		-
Medal record
Men's field hockey
Representing Argentina
Champions Challenge
Gold medal – first place	2005 Alexandria
Bronze medal – third place	2001 Kuala Lumpur
Pan American Games
Gold medal – first place	2003 Santo Domingo

Germán Mariano Orozco (born 16 January 1976) is an Argentine field hockey defender, who made his debut for the Argentina men's national field hockey team in 1994. He competed for his native country in the 2000 Summer Olympics and the 2004 Summer Olympics.

He studied kinesiology at the University of Salvador in Buenos Aires. Aged six, he started to play hockey at the Banco Nacional de Desarrollo Club. Orozco played club hockey, as of 2005, in Germany, at a club in Hamburg, named UHC Hamburg. In January 2006 he moved to Dutch champions Oranje Zwart from Eindhoven.

In early 2018 he was chosen as Carlos Retegui's replacement after he resigned as coach of the Argentina men's national field hockey team.
