= María Paz Ferrari =

Argentine field hockey player

Personal information
- Born: 12 September 1973 (age 52)
Medal record
Women's field hockey
Representing Argentina
Olympic Games
| Silver medal – second place | 2000 Sydney | Team |
World Cup
| Gold medal – first place | 2002 Perth | Team |
| Silver medal – second place | 1994 Dublin | Team |
Pan American Games
| Gold medal – first place | 1991 Havana | Team |
| Gold medal – first place | 2003 Santo Domingo | Team |
Champions Trophy
| Gold medal – first place | 2001 Amstelveen | Team |
| Silver medal – second place | 2002 Macau | Team |
| Bronze medal – third place | 2004 Rosario | Team |

María Paz Ferrari (born 12 September 1973) is a field hockey player from Argentina, who won the silver medal with the national women's hockey team at the 2000 Summer Olympics in Sydney, the Champions Trophy in 2001 and the World Cup in 2002.
