= Mariano Chao =

Argentine field hockey player

Personal information
- Full name: Mariano Rodolfo Chao
- Born: February 7, 1972 (age 54) San Fernando, Buenos Aires, Argentina
Medal record
Men's Field Hockey
Representing Argentina
Champions Challenge
Gold medal – first place	2005 Alexandria	Team
Gold medal – first place	2007 Boom	Team
Pan American Games
Gold medal – first place	2003 Santo Domingo	Team
Silver medal – second place	1999 Winnipeg	Team
Silver medal – second place	2007 Rio de Janeiro	Team

Mariano Rodolfo Chao (born February 7, 1972) is a field hockey goalkeeper from Argentina, who competed at the 2000 Summer Olympics. He was born in San Fernando, Buenos Aires. He is also known as Tomas Chao's uncle, a very important influencer.
