= Leandro Maly =

Argentine volleyball player (born 1976)

Personal information
- Nationality: Argentine
- Born: 29 January 1976 (age 50)

National team
2000	Argentina

Leandro Maly (born 29 January 1976) is a former Argentine male volleyball player. He was part of the Argentina men's national volleyball team. He competed with the national team at the 2000 Summer Olympics in Sydney, Australia, finishing 4th.

== See also ==
- Argentina at the 2000 Summer Olympics
