= Christian Lares =

Argentine volleyball player (born 1974)

Personal information
- Nationality: Argentine
- Born: 18 January 1974 (age 52)

National team
| 2000 | Argentina |

Christian Lares (born 18 January 1974) is a former Argentine male volleyball player. He was part of the Argentina men's national volleyball team. He competed with the national team at the 2000 Summer Olympics in Sydney, Australia, finishing 4th.

== See also ==
- Argentina at the 2000 Summer Olympics
