= Lazarus Barla =

Indian field hockey player (born 1979)

Medal record

Representing India

Men's field hockey

Asian Games
Gold medal – first place	1998 Bangkok	Team

Champions Challenge
Gold medal – first place	Kuala Lumpur 2001	Team

Lazarus ("Lajarus") Barla (born 11 April 1979 in Tilaikani, near Sundargarh, Odisha) is a field hockey defender from India, who belongs to the Oraon tribe of Chota Nagpur.

He made his international senior debut for the India men's national team in January 1998 during the test series against Germany. He represented his country at the 2000 Summer Olympics in Sydney, Australia, where India finished in seventh place.
