= Devesh Chauhan =

Indian field hockey player

Personal information
- Education: Jamia Millia Islamia

Sport
- Country: India
- Sport: Field hockey
Medal record
Men's field hockey
Representing India
Asian Games
Silver medal – second place	2002 Busan	Team
Asia Cup
Gold medal – first place	2003 Kuala Lumpur	Team
Champions Challenge
Gold medal – first place	2001 Kuala Lumpur	Team

Devesh Singh Chauhan (born 11 December 1981 in Village Silayta, Etawah, Uttar Pradesh) is a field hockey goalkeeper from India, who made his international debut for the Men's National Team in early 2000. Chauhan represented his native country twice at the Summer Olympics, in 2000 (Sydney, Australia) and in 2004 (Athens, Greece), where India finished in seventh place on both occasions. Chauhan got Arjuna award in 2003 by gov't to India and Lakshman award in 2001; Yash Bharti award in 2005 and Ahilyabai Hillary award in 2006 by gov't to Uttar Pradesh. Chauhan is an alumnus of Jamia Millia Islamia, New Delhi.
