= Juan Pablo Porello =

Argentine volleyball player (born 1977)

Personal information
- Nationality: Argentine
- Born: 27 June 1977 (age 49)

National team
2000	Argentina

Juan Pablo Porello (born 27 June 1977) is a former Argentine male volleyball player. He was part of the Argentina men's national volleyball team. He competed with the national team at the 2000 Summer Olympics in Sydney, Australia, finishing 4th.

== See also ==
- Argentina at the 2000 Summer Olympics
