= David Staniforth (field hockey) =

South African field hockey player

Personal information
- Born: 5 April 1976 (age 50) Durban, KwaZulu-Natal, South Africa
Medal record
Men's field hockey
Representing South Africa
Champions Challenge
Silver medal – second place	2001 Kuala Lumpur	Team
Bronze medal – third place	2003 Johannesburg	Team

David Staniforth (born 5 April 1976 in Durban) is a field hockey goalkeeper from South Africa, who was a member of the national squad that finished tenth at the 2004 Summer Olympics in Athens. The goalie plays for a provincial team called KwaZulu Natal Raiders.

Staniforth was named South African Hockey's Male Personality of the Year for 2002. He made the match-winning save from Belgian player, Jean-Philippe Brulé's flick in a penalty shoot-out to decide the final Olympic qualifying place for the 2004 Athens Games. Staniforth was substituted into the game specifically for the penalty shoot-out after the game had ended at 2-2 and the golden goal period remained scoreless.

He played for English side Fareham Hockey Club, in Hampshire and coaches the University of Southampton's male and female hockey teams.

He coaches Australian National keepers while based out of Western Australia, 2022

== International senior tournaments ==
- 2001 – Champions Challenge, Kuala Lumpur (2nd)
- 2002 – World Cup, Kuala Lumpur (13th)
- 2002 – Commonwealth Games, Manchester (4th)
- 2003 – All-Africa Games, Abuja (2nd)
- 2003 – Champions Challenge, Johannesburg (3rd)
- 2004 – Olympic Qualifier, Madrid (7th)
- 2004 – Summer Olympics, Athens (10th)
- 2005 – Champions Challenge, Alexandria (5th)
