= Lucas Rey =

Argentine field hockey player (born 1982)

Personal information
- Born: 11 October 1982 (age 43) Buenos Aires, Argentina
- Height: 1.77 m (5 ft 10 in)
- Weight: 74 kg (163 lb)

Sport
- Country: Argentina
- Sport: Field hockey
Medal record
Olympic Games
| Gold medal – first place | 2016 Rio de Janeiro | Team |
World Cup
| Bronze medal – third place | 2014 The Hague |
Champions Challenge
| Gold medal – first place | 2005 Alexandria |
| Gold medal – first place | 2007 Boom |
Pan American Games
| Gold medal – first place | 2011 Guadalajara | Team |
| Silver medal – second place | 2007 Rio de Janeiro | Team |

Lucas Rey (born 11 October 1982) is an Argentine field hockey midfielder, who plays club hockey in his native country for San Fernando. He is a member of the Men's National Team since 2002, and finished in 11th position at the 2004 Summer Olympics in Athens. Rey was also on the side ended up fifth at the 2003 Champions Trophy in Amstelveen, and won the 2005 Champions Challenge tournament in Alexandria, Egypt. Lucas has also won the bronze medal at the 2014 Men's Hockey World Cup, two medals at the Pan American Games and two Champions Challenge. He now works as a physical education teacher at Cardenal Pironio's school, in Nordelta, Buenos Aires.
