= Juan Pablo Hourquebie =

Argentine field hockey player

Personal information
- Born: 3 May 1976 (age 50)
Medal record
Men's field hockey
Representing Argentina
Champions Challenge
Gold medal – first place	2005 Alexandria	Team
Bronze medal – third place	2001 Kuala Lumpur	Team
Pan American Games
Gold medal – first place	2003 Santo Domingo	Team

Juan Pablo Hourquebie (born 3 May 1976 in Quilmes, Buenos Aires Province) is a field hockey defender from Argentina, who is nicknamed Juanpi. He is a member of the national squad since 1997, and competed in two Summer Olympics, starting in 2000. Hourquebie was on the side that won the golden medal at the 2003 Pan American Games in Santo Domingo, and won the 2005 Champions Challenge tournament in Alexandria, Egypt.
