= Ezequiel Paulón =

Argentine field hockey player

Personal information
- Born: January 4, 1976 (age 50)
Medal record
Men's field hockey
Representing Argentina
Champions Challenge
Gold medal – first place	2005 Alexandria	Team
Bronze medal – third place	2001 Kuala Lumpur	Team
Pan American Games
Gold medal – first place	2003 Santo Domingo	Team
Silver medal – second place	1999 Winnipeg	Team

Ezequiel Paulón (born January 4, 1976, in Puerto Deseado, Santa Cruz) is a field hockey defender from Argentina who twice represented his country in the Olympics, in 2000 and the 2004.
