= Marcos Riccardi =

Argentine field hockey player

Personal information
- Born: March 2, 1982 (age 44)
Medal record
Men's field hockey
Representing Argentina
Champions Challenge
Gold medal – first place	2005 Alexandria	Team
Bronze medal – third place	2001 Kuala Lumpur	Team
Pan American Games
Gold medal – first place	2003 Santo Domingo	Team

Marcos Alejandro Riccardi (born March 2, 1982) is a field hockey midfielder from Argentina. He was a member of the national squad at the 2006 Men's Hockey World Cup in Mönchengladbach where they finished 10th place overall. He was also a member of the Argentinian Olympic team that finished in 8th place at the 2000 Summer Olympics in Sydney, Australia.
