= Bruce Jacobs (field hockey) =

South African field hockey player

Personal information
- Born: March 27, 1975 (age 51) Cape Town, Western Cape, South Africa
Medal record
Men's field hockey
Representing South Africa
Champions Challenge
Silver medal – second place	2001 Kuala Lumpur	Team
Bronze medal – third place	2003 Johannesburg	Team

Bruce Jacobs (born March 27, 1975, in Cape Town, Western Cape) is a male field hockey player from South Africa, who was a member of the national squad that finished tenth at the 2004 Summer Olympics in Athens. Jacobs also represented his native country at the 2008 Summer Olympics in Beijing.

== International senior tournaments ==
- 2001 – Champions Challenge, Kuala Lumpur (2nd)
- 2002 – Commonwealth Games, Manchester (4th)
- 2003 – Champions Challenge, Johannesburg (3rd)
- 2004 – Olympic Qualifier, Madrid (7th)
- 2004 – Summer Olympics, Athens (10th)
- 2006 – Commonwealth Games, Melbourne (8th)
- 2006 – World Cup, Mönchengladbach (12th)
- 2008 – Summer Olympics, Beijing (12th)
