= Denzil Dolley =

South African field hockey player

Personal information
- Born: 22 July 1977 (age 48) Port Elizabeth, South Africa
Medal record
Men's field hockey
Representing South Africa
Champions Challenge
Silver medal – second place	2001 Kuala Lumpur	Team

Denzil Dolley (born 22 July 1977 in Port Elizabeth, Eastern Cape) is a field hockey player from South Africa, who was a member of the national squad that finished tenth at the 2004 Summer Olympics in Athens. He played for the University of Port Elizabeth and a provincial team called KwaZulu Natal Raiders. He has previously played for Holcombe Hockey Club - based in Rochester, Kent - in the UK National League, as well as coaching Sanderstead Hockey Club. He is now the 1st XI player/coach at Woking Hockey Club - based in Surrey.

== International senior tournaments ==
- 2001 – Champions Challenge, Kuala Lumpur (2nd)
- 2002 – World Cup, Kuala Lumpur (13th)
- 2002 – Commonwealth Games, Manchester (4th)
- 2003 – All-Africa Games, Abuja (2nd)
- 2004 – Summer Olympics, Athens (10th)
- 2006 – World Cup, Mönchengladbach (12th)
