= Mario Almada (field hockey) =

Argentine field hockey player

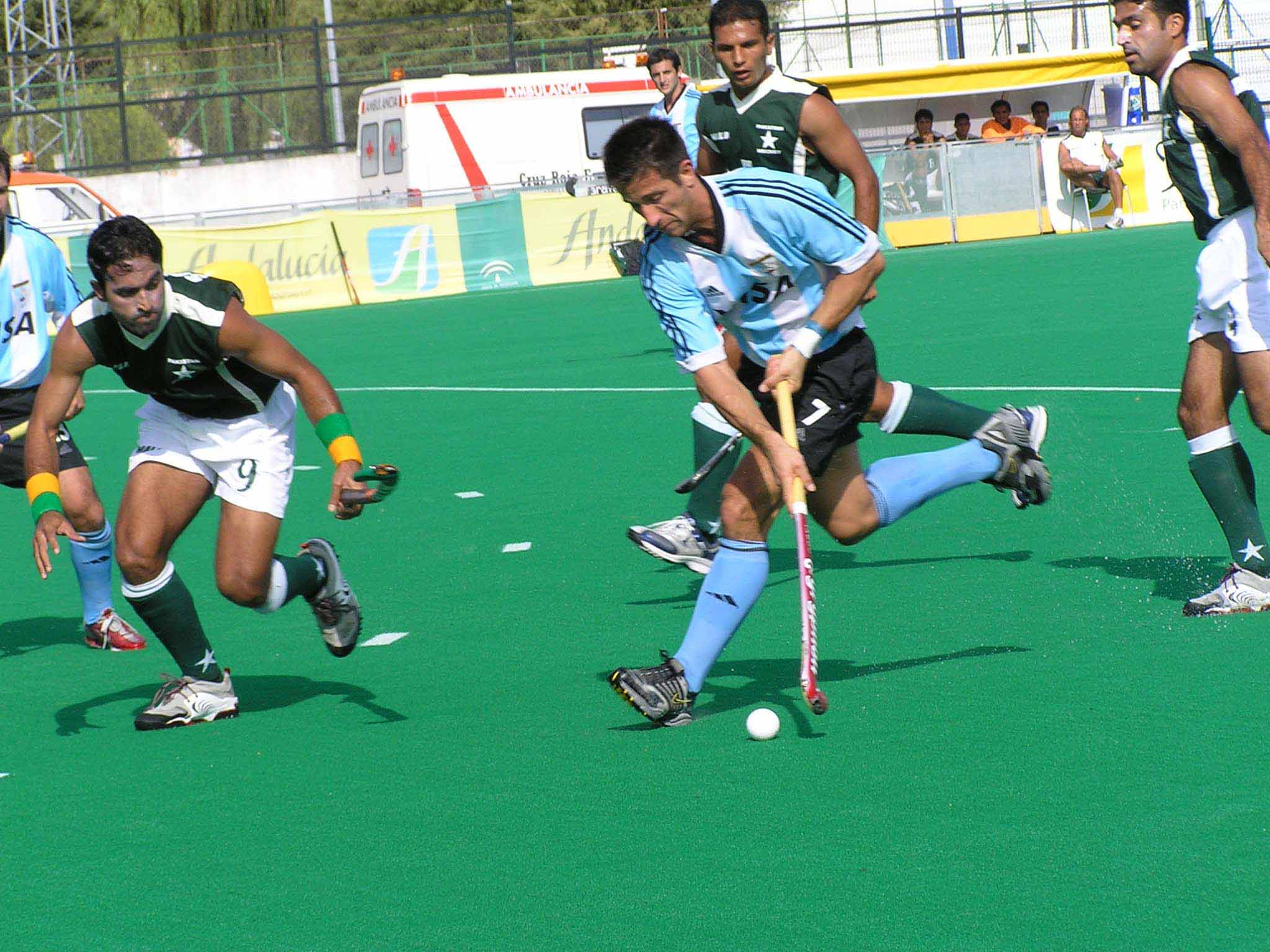
- Almada with the ball during a match between Argentina and Pakistan

Personal information
- Born: Mario Nicolás Almada; 20 May 1975 (age 51) Buenos Aires

Sport
- Country: Argentina
- Sport: Hockey
Medal record
Representing Argentina
Men's field hockey
Champions Challenge
Gold medal – first place	2005 Alexandria	Team
Gold medal – first place	2007 Boom	Team
Bronze medal – third place	2001 Kuala Lumpur	Team
Pan American Games
Gold medal – first place	2003 Santo Domingo	Team
Silver medal – second place	2007 Rio de Janeiro	Team

Mario Nicolás Almada (born 20 May 1975 in Buenos Aires) is a field hockey forward from Argentina.

Almada made his debut for the national squad in 1994, and competed in the 2000 Summer Olympics and the 2004 Summer Olympics. He has also been involved in coaching for the national team.

He has played club hockey in Spain with Club de Campo and Real Club de Polo de Barcelona; in the Netherlands for Laren; and in India in the Premier Hockey League for Orissa Steelers and then in the World Series Hockey for Pune Strykers.
