= Jody Paul =

South African field hockey player

Jody Paul (born 25 May 1976) is a South African former field hockey player who competed in the 2004 Summer Olympics.

On 25 January 2022 Paul was appointed as the Assistant Coach to the England and Great Britain senior women's squads.
