= Kris Kane =

Scottish field hockey player

Kris Kane (born 5 December 1980, in Glasgow) is a Scottish field hockey player, who was a member of the national squad that finished 8th in the 2003 European Nations Cup in Barcelona. The goalkeeper plays for Western Wildcats, and has won five Scottish National League titles and four Scottish Cups. Kane became player coach of Western Wildcats in 2007

Kris has 49 caps and has 31 under twenty one caps for the Scottish National team.

Kris was a youth player at Rangers F.C. before a broken leg forced him to abandon football as a career choice. His brother, Barry, was already a hockey player and Kris took up the sport as a result.

Described by many as having an un-conventional goalkeeping style, Kane was a member of the National team since 2001 but did not play for the national team between 2006 and 2008 after a public disagreement with then head coach Matthias Ahrens over his selection policies.

Shortly after Ahrens departure from his role as head coach it was announced that Kane had been selected for the Scottish national team once again. Kane works as a Solicitor for the Scottish Procurator Fiscal Office.
