= Matías Vila =

Argentine field hockey player

Personal information
- Born: 7 July 1979 (age 47)
Medal record
Men's field hockey
Representing Argentina
Champions Trophy
Bronze medal – third place	2008 Rotterdam	Team
Champions Challenge
Gold medal – first place	2005 Alexandria	Team
Bronze medal – third place	2001 Kuala Lumpur	Team
Pan American Games
Gold medal – first place	2003 Santo Domingo	Team
Gold medal – first place	2011 Guadalajara	Team
Silver medal – second place	1999 Winnipeg	Team
Silver medal – second place	2007 Rio de Janeiro	Team

Matías Damián Vila (born 7 July 1979 in Buenos Aires) is a field hockey midfielder from Argentina, who made his debut for the national squad in 1997, and competed for his native country in the 2000 Summer Olympics, 2004 Summer Olympics and 2012 Summer Olympics.

Vila started to play hockey aged seven. After the Athens Games he moved from Banco Provincia to Dutch club HC Tilburg, which had just been promoted to the top league in the Netherlands, together with fellow international Tomás MacCormik. His younger brothers Rodrigo and Lucas are also field hockey internationals for Argentina. With the national squad, Matías has won the bronze medal at the 2008 Men's Hockey Champions Trophy and four medals at the Pan American Games.
