= Tomás MacCormik =

Argentine field hockey player

Personal information
- Born: June 7, 1978 (age 48)
Medal record
Men's field hockey
Representing Argentina
Champions Challenge
Gold medal – first place	2005 Alexandria	Team
Bronze medal – third place	2001 Kuala Lumpur	Team
Pan American Games
Gold medal – first place	2003 Santo Domingo	Team
Silver medal – second place	1999 Winnipeg	Team

Tomás MacCormik (born June 7, 1978, in Buenos Aires) is a field hockey midfielder from Argentina. MacCormik began playing hockey at age seven. He made his debut for the national squad in 1996 (at which time his father Miguel was the head coach), and competed for his native country in the 2000 Summer Olympics and the 2004 Summer Olympics. After the Athens Games, MacCormik moved from Club San Fernando to top-level Dutch club HC Tilburg, together with fellow international Matias Vila.
