= James Stedman =

English politician (fl. 1659)

James Stedman (fl. 1659), was an English Member of Parliament (MP).

He was a Member of the Parliament of England for Chippenham in 1659.
