= Fernando Oscaris =

Argentine field hockey player

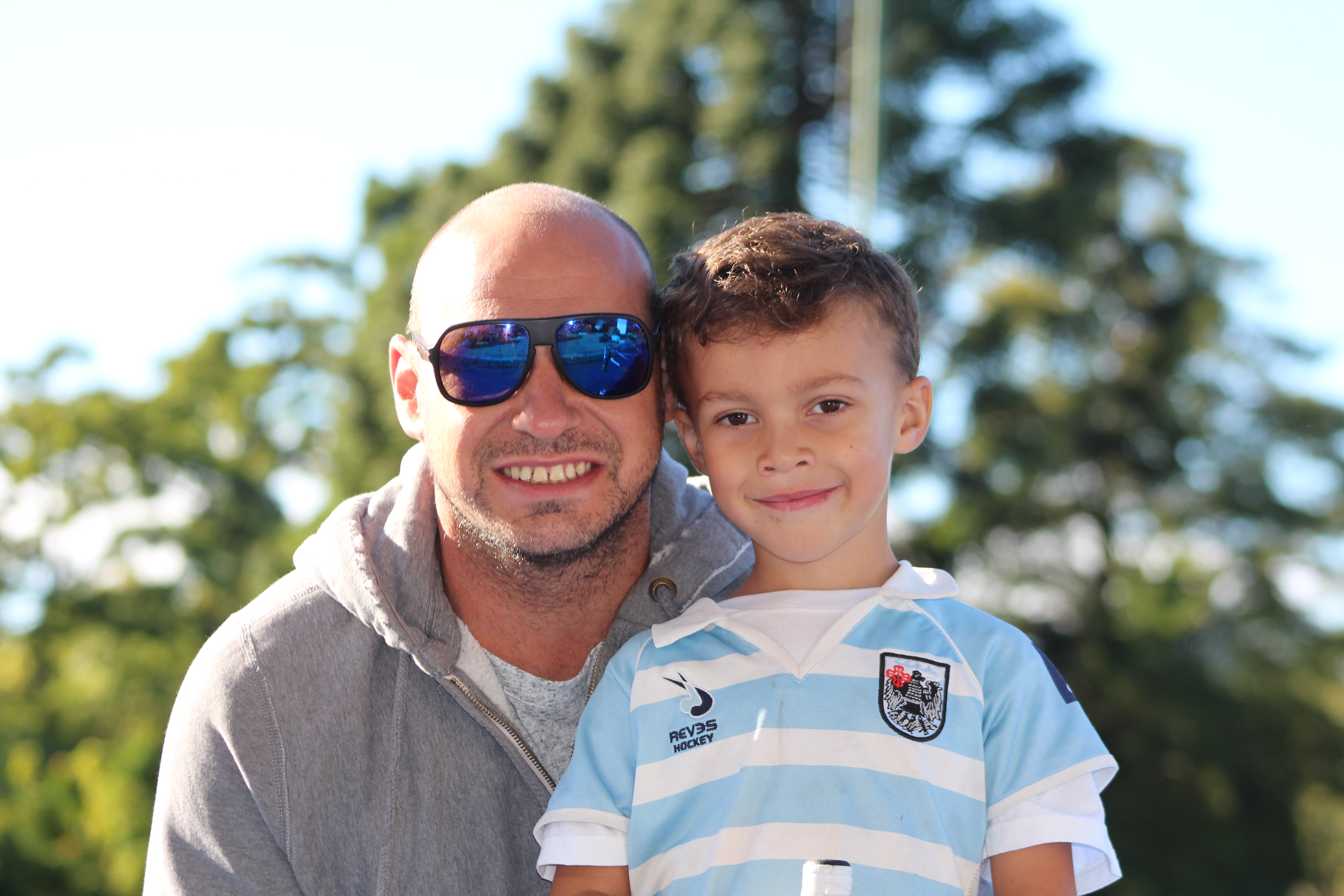

Personal information
- Born: December 11, 1979 (age 46) Buenos Aires, Argentina
Medal record
Men's field hockey
Representing Argentina
Champions Challenge
Gold medal – first place	2005 Alexandria	Team
Bronze medal – third place	2001 Kuala Lumpur	Team
Pan American Games
Gold medal – first place	2003 Santo Domingo	Team

Fernando Ezequiel Oscaris (born December 11, 1979, in Buenos Aires) is a field hockey defender from Argentina, who was a member of the national squad that competed in the 2000 Summer Olympics in Sydney, Australia. He was on the side that won the golden medal at the 2003 Pan American Games in Santo Domingo.
