= Michael Lee (field hockey) =

Canadian field hockey player

Michael Lee (born April 18, 1980 in North Vancouver, British Columbia) is a field hockey player from Canada.

Lee earned his first senior cap on July 10, 2001 against Belgium in Brussels (win 3-2). The defender is a resident of Tsawwassen, British Columbia, and plays for Victoria Selects.

== International senior competitions ==
- 2001 – World Cup Qualifier, Edinburgh (8th)
- 2002 – Commonwealth Games, Manchester (6th)
- 2003 – Pan American Games, Santo Domingo (2nd)
- 2004 – Pan Am Cup, London (2nd)
- 2006 – Commonwealth Games, Melbourne (9th)
