= Pablo Moreira =

Argentine field hockey player

Personal information
- Born: November 8, 1970 (age 56)
Medal record
Men's field hockey
Representing Argentina
Champions Challenge
Bronze medal – third place	2001 Kuala Lumpur	Team
Pan American Games
Gold medal – first place	1991 Havana	Team
Gold medal – first place	1995 Mar del Plata	Team
Gold medal – first place	2003 Santo Domingo	Team

Pablo Javier Moreira Virgini (born November 8, 1970, in Quilmes) is a field hockey goalkeeper from Argentina, who made his debut for the national squad in 1991 at the Pan American Games in Cuba. He played for Club Atlético Ducilo in Buenos Aires. Moreira competed for his native country at the 1992 Summer Olympics in Barcelona (11th place), the 2000 Summer Olympics in Sydney (8th place) and at the 2004 Summer Olympics in Athens (11th place).
