= Charles Vandeweghe =

Belgian field hockey player

Personal information
- Born: 14 October 1982 (age 43) Ghent, East Flanders
Medal record
Men's field hockey
Representing Belgium
Champions Challenge
| Bronze medal – third place | 2005 Alexandria | Team |

Charles Vandeweghe (born 14 October 1982 in Ghent, East Flanders) is a field hockey forward from Belgium, who was a member of the Men's National Team that missed qualification for the 2004 Summer Olympics in Athens.

Belgium finished in 8th place at the Olympic Qualifier Tournament in Madrid, in March 2004, after losing on penalty strokes against South Africa. Vandeweghe plays for a club in his native country called Waterloo Ducks. He competed at the 2008 Summer Olympics for his native country. His brother Loïc Vandeweghe was on the same team.
