= Javier Bruses =

Spanish field hockey player (born 1979)

Javier Bruses Manresa (born May 11, 1979 in Barcelona, Spain) is a field hockey goalkeeper from Spain, who was a member of the Men's National Team that finished fourth at the 2004 Summer Olympics in Athens, Greece. This goalie of Real Club de Polo won the title at the Champions Trophy tournament in Lahore (2004), and at the 2005 Men's Hockey European Nations Cup in Leipzig.

Currently playing in the third team of Real Club de Polo Barcelona as a striker, he received the golden medal of Real Club de Polo Barcelona for his hockey carrier representing his club.
