= Jorge Lombi =

Argentine field hockey player

Personal information
- Born: November 1, 1971 (age 54)
Medal record
Men's field hockey
Representing Argentina
Champions Challenge
Bronze medal – third place	2001 Kuala Lumpur	Team
Gold medal – first place	2005 Alexandria	Team
Gold medal – first place	2007 Boom	Team
Pan American Games
Gold medal – first place	1995 Mar del Plata	Team
Silver medal – second place	1999 Winnipeg	Team
Gold medal – first place	2003 Santo Domingo	Team
Silver medal – second place	2007 Rio de Janeiro	Team

Jorge Maximiliano Lombi Etulain (born November 1, 1971, in Buenos Aires) is a field hockey player from Argentina, who made his debut for the national squad in 1991 in a friendly against Spain.

Lombi also plays for the Hyderabad Sultans in the Indian Premier Hockey League. In the fall of 2008 he was dismissed from the national team.

== See also ==
- List of men's field hockey players with 100 or more international goals
