= Jean-Philippe Brulé =

Belgian field hockey player (born 1981)

Medal record

Representing Belgium

Men's field hockey

Champions Challenge
Bronze medal – third place	Alexandria 2005	Team

Jean-Philippe Brulé (born May 13, 1981) is a field hockey player from Belgium, who was a member of the national squad that missed qualification for the 2004 Summer Olympics in Athens. Belgium finished in 8th place at the Olympic Qualifier Tournament in Madrid, in March 2004, after losing on penalty strokes against South Africa. Brulé, a defender from a club called Pingouin, is famous for his penalty corner. His nickname is Zoulou.
