= Nick Brothers =

British field hockey player (born 1983)

Personal information
- Born: 19 August 1983 (age 42) Swindon, England

Sport
- Sport: Field hockey
- Position: Goalkeeper
Senior career
Years	Team	Caps	Goals
2002–2005	Firebrands	-	-
2004–2005	Schwarz-Weiß Neuss	-	-
2005–2012	Reading	-	-
National team
Years	Team	Caps	Goals
–	England		-
Medal record
Field hockey
Representing England
European Championship
Gold medal – first place	2009 Amsteveen	Team
Bronze medal – third place	2011 Mönchengladbach	Team
Champions Trophy
Silver medal – second place	2010 Mönchengladbach	Team

Nicholas Simon Brothers (born 19 August 1983) is a British former field hockey player who played for England.

== Biography ==
Brothers born in Swindon, England, was educated at Oakley Hall School in Cirencester and then Millfield where he was selected for the England U16 and U18 teams. He studied at the University of Exeter and also played in Germany's Bundesliga for Schwarz-Weiß Neuss for one season.

He played club hockey for Reading in the Men's England Hockey League after joining the team for the 2005/06 season.

While at Reading he participated in the 2006 Men's Hockey World Cup and 2010 Men's Hockey World Cup. Brothers a part time investment banker with Nomura in London, was a travelling reserve for the 2010 Commonwealth Games in Delhi. He was part of the silver medal-winning England team that competed at the 2010 Men's Hockey Champions Trophy in Mönchengladbach, Germany.

Brothers announced his retirement after the 2011/2012 season.
