= Fernando Zylberberg =

Argentine field hockey player

Personal information
- Born: June 30, 1977 (age 49)
Medal record
Men's field hockey
Representing Argentina
Champions Challenge
Gold medal – first place	2005 Alexandria	Team
Gold medal – first place	2007 Boom	Team
Bronze medal – third place	2001 Kuala Lumpur	Team
Pan American Games
Gold medal – first place	2003 Santo Domingo	Team
Gold medal – first place	2011 Guadalajara	Team
Silver medal – second place	1999 Winnipeg	Team
Silver medal – second place	2007 Rio de Janeiro	Team

Fernando Zylberberg (born June 30, 1977) is a retired field hockey player from Argentina.

== Biography ==
Zylberberg was born in Buenos Aires, Argentina. With the National team, he made his debut in 1997 and competed for his native country at the 2000 Summer Olympics and 2004 Summer Olympics. After a short spell at Dutch club Hurley, he played at Atlético San Sebastián, in Spain.

== Special participation on television ==
In May 2012, a television advertisement emerged by made by Young & Rubicam, an American advertisement agency owned by the British agency WPP plc and made on behalf of the Argentine Presidency, entitled Olympic Games 2012: Homage to the Fallen and the Veterans of the Malvinas, featured Zylberberg training in the Falkland Islands.

The video features Zylberberg outside the Globe Tavern, doing dips on benches, then running past a British red telephone box. He then carries out step-ups on the islands' Great War Memorial honouring British sailors who died battling the German fleet in 1914, and finally ends with the quote "Para competir en suelo inglés, entrenamos en suelo argentino" ("To compete on English soil, we are training on Argentine soil."). Zylberberg entered the Falkland Islands on the pretext that he would be taking part in a marathon on the island. Zylberberg stated that his feature in the video conveys his country's feelings over the islands, stating "The message is that to every Argentine the islands belong to Argentina. To me to be training in any other province or to do it over the islands is the same,". The clip was first aired on May 2, the 30th anniversary of the sinking of the ARA General Belgrano, involving the death of 323 troops, nearly half of Argentina's total 649 losses during the Falklands conflict.

The advert drew protest from the Falkland Islands government, the British Government and within Argentina, both for the film's political aspects, and also that Zylberberg climbed over a British World War I war memorial. On 4 May 2012, the advertising agency responsible issued a public apology. The International Olympic Committee criticised Argentina, stating that the Olympic games should not be used as a forum to raise political issues. The president of the Argentine Olympic Committee, Gerardo Werthein issued a statement: "Using the Olympic Games to make political gestures of any kind is not acceptable and we will conduct ourselves in the proper spirit of Olympism in all that we do in London and elsewhere".

It was revealed on May 9 that Zylberberg was to be dropped from the final Olympic warm-up event before the Olympic games and as a result, miss the games altogether. His absence from the squad was attributed by his coach, Pablo Rossi, to "sporting reasons," and that Zylberberg "had not been able to complete all the necessary steps in pre-season". However, there is speculation that Zylberberg was dropped to avoid adverse attention to the team and potential media frenzy when players land in London in July 2012. As a result of his involvement with the advertisement, Zylberberg was also the subject of online threats.
