= Philippe Goldberg =

Belgian hockey player

Personal information
- Nationality: Belgian
- Born: 10 May 1979 (age 46) Etterbeek, Belgium

Sport
- Sport: Field hockey

Philippe Goldberg (born 10 May 1979) is a Belgian former field hockey player. He competed in the men's tournament at the 2008 Summer Olympics.
