= Jon Ebsworth =

British field hockey player

Personal information
- Born: 15 August 1978 (age 47) England
- Height: 182 cm (6 ft 0 in)
- Weight: 80 kg (176 lb)

Sport
- Sport: Field hockey
- Position: Goalkeeper
Senior career
Years	Team	Caps	Goals
1997–2004	Teddington	-	-
2004–2006	Surbiton	-	-
National team
Years	Team	Caps	Goals
1998–2006	GB & England	50	-

Jonathan Ebsworth (born 15 August 1978) is a British former field hockey player.

== Biography ==
Ebsworth played club hockey for Teddington in the Men's England Hockey League during 1997, when he was voted goalkeeper of the World Junior Cup at Milton Keynes in 1997.

Ebsworth left Teddington to play for Surbiton for the 2004/05 season and while at Surbiton he represented England at the 2005 Men's EuroHockey Nations Championship and was named UK player of the year for 2005.

He was part of the England Commonwealth Games team at the 2006 Commonwealth Games in Melbourne.
