= Patrice Houssein =

Belgian hockey player

Personal information
- Nationality: Belgian
- Born: 14 September 1977 (age 48) Brussels, Belgium

Sport
- Sport: Field hockey

Patrice Houssein (born 14 September 1977) is a Belgian field hockey player. He competed in the men's tournament at the 2008 Summer Olympics.
