= Marvin Bam =

South African field hockey player

Marvin Bam (born 12 September 1977) is a South African field hockey player who competed in the 2008 Summer Olympics.
