= Thierry Renaer =

Belgian field hockey player

Personal information
- Born: 4 March 1976 (age 50)
Medal record
Men's field hockey
Representing Belgium
Champions Challenge
Bronze medal – third place	2005 Alexandria	Team

Thierry Renaer (born 4 March 1976 in Leuven, Flemish Brabant) is a field hockey defender from Belgium, who made his debut for the Men's National Team in 1993.

Renaer was a member of the squad, that missed qualification for the 2004 Summer Olympics in Athens. Belgium finished in 8th place at the Olympic Qualifier Tournament in Madrid, in March 2004, after losing on penalty strokes against South Africa. Renaer plays for a club called KHC Leuven in his native country. Renaer played for 15 years with the Belgian National Team and earned during that period three times the golden stick award in his country. This is the highest award a hockey player can get in Belgium. During that period there were 2 participations in a World cup and 4 participations in European Cups, on which Belgium ended three times on the 4th place in Europe. In 2008, Renaer was a member of the Olympic squad that finished 9th in the Olympic Games in Beijing. Also in that year, he won the Belgian Championship with his native club. It was the first time his club reached that momentum in its history.
