= Nor Azlan Bakar =

Malaysian field hockey player (born 1977)

Personal information
- Nationality: Malaysian
- Born: 14 December 1977 (age 48)

Sport
- Sport: Field hockey

Nor Azlan Bakar (born 14 December 1977) is a Malaysian field hockey player. He competed in the men's tournament at the 2000 Summer Olympics.
