= John Numbers =

American electronic sports player

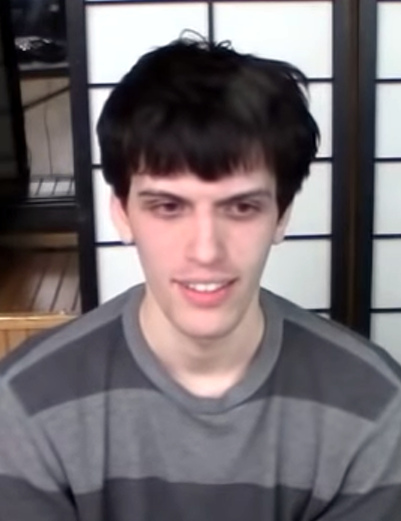
- Goldberg in 2018

Personal information
- Name: John Goldberg
- Born: April 10, 1992 (age 34); New York

Career information
- Playing career: 2015–present

John Goldberg, better known professionally as John Numbers, is an American gamer known for winning the 2015 Nintendo World Championship and being the runner-up at the 2017 Nintendo World Championship.

== Nintendo World Championship ==
Goldberg qualified for the 2015 Nintendo World Championships by receiving a score of 4.7 million on the NWC regional challenge at Best Buy in Long Island, NY. He returned for the 2017 NWC as one of the 13-and-older qualifiers after completing the GBA Bowser Castle 1 track in Mario Kart 7 with a time of 1:16.120. Goldberg received television coverage on Disney XD.
