= Jorge Ruiz (field hockey) =

Argentine field hockey player

Jorge Ruiz (born January 22, 1958, in San Andrés, in the province of Buenos Aires), is a former field hockey player from Argentina, who later became a coach in his sport and guided the Men's National Team – first as an assistant, later as head coach – at the 1992, 1996, 2000 and 2004 Summer Olympics. After the 2005 Men's Hockey Champions Challenge he resigned and was replaced by Argentina's women's head coach Sergio Vigil.
