= Xavier Reckinger =

Belgian field hockey player

Personal information
- Born: 20 December 1983 (age 42) Brussels, Belgium

Sport
- Sport: Field hockey
- Position: Defender
Youth career
- Years: Team
- 1990–1998: Herakles
Senior career
Years	Team	Caps	Goals
1998–2002	Herakles	-	-
2002–2003	New Zealand	-	-
2003–2005	Oranje Zwart	-	-
2005–2009	Dragons	-	-
2009–2016	Braxgata	-	-
2016–2017	Herakles	-	-
National team
Years	Team	Caps	Goals
2002–2014	Belgium	326	-
Medal record
Men's field hockey
Representing Belgium
EuroHockey Championship
Silver medal – second place	2013 Boom	Team

Xavier Reckinger (born 20 December 1983) is a Belgian international field hockey player and coach of the Germany women's national field hockey team.

He played for Braxgata in Boom and is a defender. Before he played with the KHC Dragons. At the 2012 Summer Olympics, with the national team, he finished fifth in the men's tournament. Reckinger became European vice-champion with Belgium at the 2013 European Championship on home ground in Boom.

In January 2015 Xavier Reckinger was added to the coaching staff of the Red panthers. He has coached many players at club level that have made the national teams such as Felix Denayer, Jeffrey Thijs, Barbara Nelen, Aline Fobe, Judith Vandermeiren, Emilie Sinia, who all made the Olympics too.

Reckinger is a Master in Trade Sciences (Lessius Hogeschool). He runs an own consultancy enterprise.
