= Maxime Luycx =

Belgian hockey player

Maxime Luycx (born 18 September 1982) is a Belgian field hockey player. At the 2008 and 2012 Summer Olympics, he competed for the national team in the men's tournament. He played as a midfielder for Belgian hockey club Waterloo Ducks.
