= Loïc Vandeweghe =

Belgian field hockey player

Personal information
- Nationality: Belgian
- Born: 23 September 1983 (age 42) Ghent, Belgium

Sport
- Sport: Field hockey

Loïc Vandeweghe (born 23 September 1983) is a Belgian field hockey player. He competed in the men's tournament at the 2008 Summer Olympics.
