= Thomas van den Balck =

Belgian hockey player (born 1982)

Personal information
- Nationality: Belgian
- Born: 31 August 1982 (age 43) Uccle, Belgium

Sport
- Sport: Field hockey

Thomas van den Balck (born 31 August 1982) is a Belgian field hockey player. He competed in the men's tournament at the 2008 Summer Olympics.
