= Field hockey at the 2003 Pan American Games =

- Venue: Parque del Este Hockey Stadium
- Dates: August 1 – 17
- Competitors: 256 from 9 nations

The field hockey tournament at the 2003 Pan American Games was held in the Parque del Este Hockey Stadium, Santo Domingo, Dominican Republic from August 1–17, 2003. It served as a qualification tournament for the 2004 Summer Olympics in Athens, Greece. First place received a ticket for the Olympic tournament. The men competed for the tenth time at the Pan Americans, the women for the fifth time.

== Medal summary ==
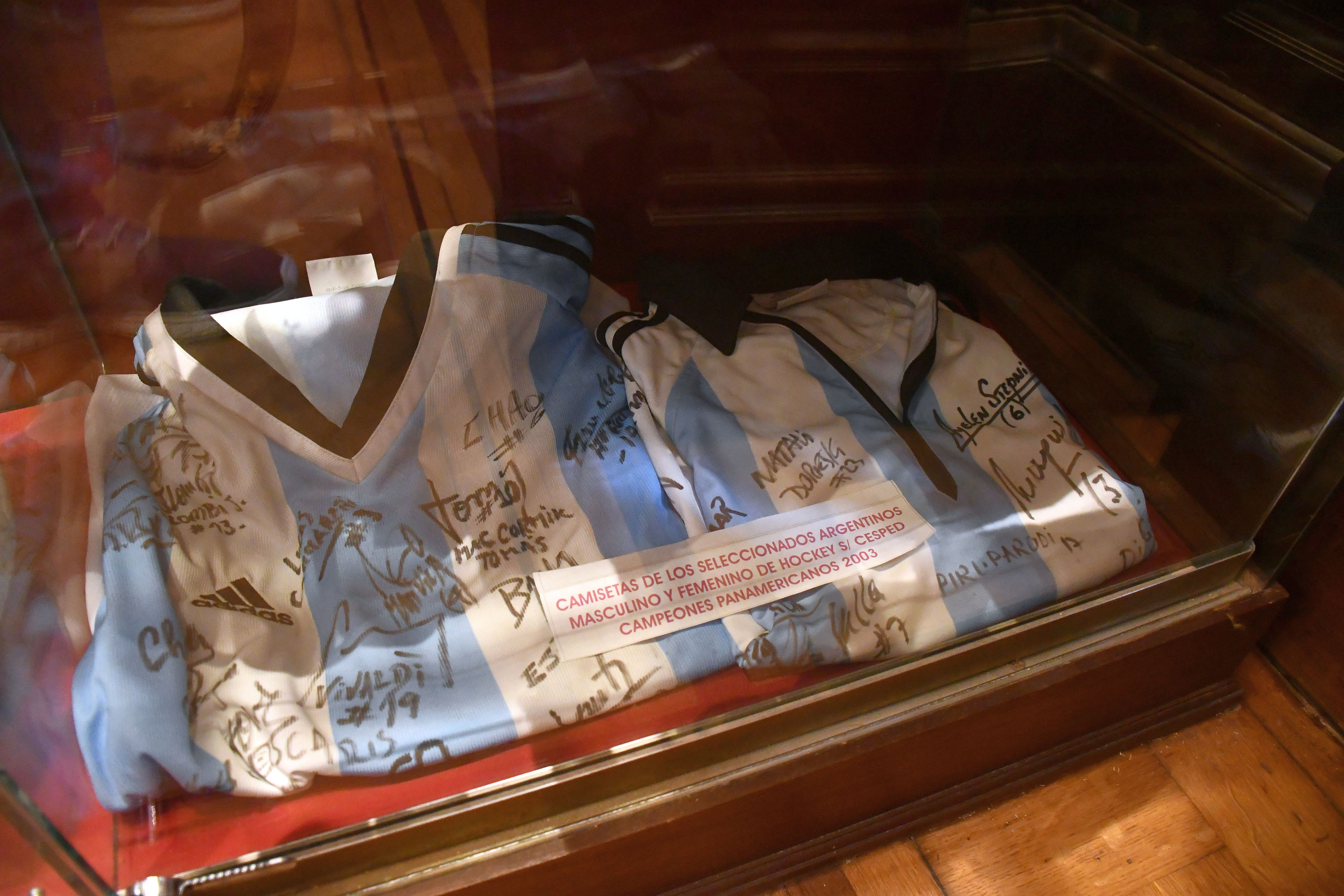
Argentine uniform signed by the gold medalist exhibited at the Argentine Olympic Committee museum.

=== Medal table ===
Rank	Nation	Gold	Silver	Bronze	Total
1	Argentina	2	0	0	2
2	Canada	0	1	0	1
2	United States	0	1	0	1
4	Cuba	0	0	1	1
4	Uruguay	0	0	1	1
Totals (5 entries)		2	2	2	6

=== Events ===
Event	Gold	Silver	Bronze
Men	Argentina	Canada	Cuba
Women	Argentina	United States	Uruguay

== Qualification ==
A total of eight men's and eight women's teams qualified to compete at the games. The eight quotas in both the men's and women's tournaments were the same, consisting of the following:

- Host nation.
- Defending champions.
- Top two placed teams at the Central American and Caribbean Games.
- Highest placed team at the men's and women's South American Championship, not already qualified.
- The three remaining quotas were awarded to the highest placed teams from the men's and women's Pan American Cups.

Each nation was entitled to enter 16 athletes per team, for a total of 256 athletes across both competitions.

=== Men's qualification ===
The qualification route for the men's tournament is as follows.

Dates	Event	Location	Qualifier(s)
Host nation			Dominican Republic
24 July – 4 August 1999	1999 Pan American Games	Winnipeg, Canada	Canada
22 June – 2 July 2000	2000 Pan American Cup	Havana, Cuba	Chile; Cuba; United States
23 November – 3 December 2002	2002 CAC Games	San Salvador, El Salvador	Barbados; Trinidad and Tobago
16–23 March 2003	2003 South American Championship	Santiago, Chile	Argentina

=== Women's qualification ===
The qualification route for the women's tournament is as follows.

Dates	Event	Location	Qualifier(s)
Host nation			Dominican Republic
24 July – 4 August 1999	1999 Pan American Games	Winnipeg, Canada	Argentina
8–18 March 2001	2001 Pan American Cup	Kingston, Jamaica	Canada; United States; Uruguay
23 November – 3 December 2002	2002 CAC Games	San Salvador, El Salvador	Jamaica; Trinidad and Tobago
16–23 March 2003	2003 South American Championship	Santiago, Chile	Chile

== Men's competition ==
The competition consisted of two stages; a preliminary round followed by a classification round.

=== Preliminary round ===
==== Pool A ====
Pos	Team	Pld	W	D	L	GF	GA	GD	Pts	Qualification
1	Argentina	3	3	0	0	35	0	+35	9	Semi-finals
2	Chile	3	1	1	1	25	1	+24	4	Semi-finals
3	United States	3	1	1	1	23	4	+19	4	
4	Dominican Republic (H)	3	0	0	3	0	78	−78	0	

Source: PAHF
Rules for classification: 1) points; 2) goal difference; 3) goals scored; 4) head-to-head result.
(H) Hosts

==== Pool B ====
Pos	Team	Pld	W	D	L	GF	GA	GD	Pts	Qualification
1	Canada	3	3	0	0	7	3	+4	9	Semi-finals
2	Cuba	3	2	0	1	12	3	+9	6	Semi-finals
3	Trinidad and Tobago	3	1	0	2	6	6	0	3	
4	Barbados	3	0	0	3	2	15	−13	0	

Source: PAHF
Rules for classification: 1) points; 2) goal difference; 3) goals scored; 4) head-to-head result.

=== Medal round ===
Semi-finals
9 August 2003
Argentina	5
Cuba	1
9 August 2003
Canada	3
Chile	1

Gold Medal Match
13 August 2003
Argentina	1
Canada	0
Bronze Medal Match
13 August 2003
Cuba	6
Chile	2

== Women's competition ==
The competition consisted of two stages; a preliminary round followed by a classification round.

=== Preliminary round ===
==== Pool A ====
Pos	Team	Pld	W	D	L	GF	GA	GD	Pts	Qualification
1	Argentina	3	3	0	0	47	1	+46	9	Semi-finals
2	Chile	3	2	0	1	24	14	+10	6	Semi-finals
3	Trinidad and Tobago	3	1	0	2	7	13	−6	3	
4	Dominican Republic (H)	3	0	0	3	1	51	−50	0	

Source: PAHF
Rules for classification: 1) points; 2) goal difference; 3) goals scored; 4) head-to-head result.
(H) Hosts

==== Pool B ====
Pos	Team	Pld	W	D	L	GF	GA	GD	Pts	Qualification
1	United States	3	3	0	0	13	0	+13	9	Semi-finals
2	Uruguay	3	1	1	1	6	6	0	4	Semi-finals
3	Canada	3	1	1	1	4	4	0	4	
4	Jamaica	3	0	0	3	0	13	−13	0	

Source: PAHF
Rules for classification: 1) points; 2) goal difference; 3) goals scored; 4) head-to-head result.

=== Medal round ===
Semi-finals
10 August 2003
Argentina	7
Uruguay	0
10 August 2003
United States	6
Chile	1

Gold Medal Match
13 August 2003
Argentina	3
United States	1
Bronze Medal Match
13 August 2003
Uruguay (pen.)	2 (5)
Chile	2 (4)
