= Men's Hockey Champions Challenge I =

Former men's field hockey tournament

- Most recent season or competition: 2014 Men's Hockey Champions Challenge I
- Formerly: Men's Hockey Champions Challenge
- Sport: Field hockey
- First season: 2001
- Folded: 2014
- Replaced by: Hockey World League
- No. of teams: 8
- Continent: International (FIH)
- Last champion: South Korea (1st title) (2014)
- Most titles: Argentina (3 titles)

The Men's Hockey Champions Challenge I was an international men's field hockey tournament, played every two years.

It was introduced in 2001 by the International Hockey Federation (FIH) in order to broaden hockey's competitive base at world level. Launched in 2001, the last tournament was held in 2014 in Malaysia and won by South Korea. The champions challenge was replaced by the FIH Hockey World League in 2014 after eight editions.

== Results ==
=== Summaries ===
Year	Host	Final			Third place game			Number of teams
Year	Host	Winner	Score	Runner-up	Third place	Score	Fourth place	Number of teams
2001; Details	Kuala Lumpur, Malaysia	India	2–1	South Africa	Argentina	4–2	Malaysia	6
2003; Details	Johannesburg, South Africa	Spain	7–3	South Korea	South Africa	2–2 (a.e.t.) (5–4 p.s.)	New Zealand	6
2005; Details	Alexandria, Egypt	Argentina	5–2	South Korea	Belgium	6–5	England	6
2007; Details	Boom, Belgium	Argentina	3–2 (a.e.t.)	New Zealand	India	4–3	England	6
2009; Details	Salta, Argentina	New Zealand	4–2	Pakistan	India	3–2	Argentina	8
2011; Details	Johannesburg, South Africa	Belgium	4–3	India	South Africa	3–1	Argentina	8
2012; Details	Quilmes, Argentina	Argentina	5–0	South Korea	Ireland	4–3 (a.e.t.)	Malaysia	8
2014; Details	Kuantan, Malaysia	South Korea	4–0	Canada	Malaysia	4–2	Ireland	8

=== Successful national teams ===
Team	Titles	Runners-up	Third places	Fourth places
Argentina	3 (2005, 2007, 2012*)		1 (2001)	2 (2009*, 2011)
South Korea	1 (2014)	3 (2003, 2005, 2012)		
India	1 (2001)	1 (2011)	2 (2007, 2009)	
New Zealand	1 (2009)	1 (2007)		1 (2003)
Belgium	1 (2011)		1 (2005)	
Spain	1 (2003)			
South Africa		1 (2001)	2 (2003*, 2011)	
Canada		1 (2014)		
Pakistan		1 (2009)		
Malaysia			1 (2014*)	2 (2001*, 2012)
Ireland			1 (2012)	1 (2014)
England				2 (2005, 2007)

* = host nation

=== Team appearances ===
Team	(Malaysia) 2001	(South Africa) 2003	(Egypt) 2005	(Belgium) 2007	(Argentina) 2009	(South Africa) 2011	(Argentina) 2012	(Malaysia) 2014	Total
Argentina	3rd	–	1st	1st	4th	4th	1st	–	6
Belgium	6th	–	3rd	6th	7th	1st	–	–	5
Canada	–	–	–	–	8th	8th	6th	2nd	4
China	–	–	–	–	6th	–	–	–	1
Egypt	–	–	6th	–	–	–	–	–	1
England	–	5th	4th	4th	–	–	–	–	3
France	–	–	–	–	–	–	–	6th	1
India	1st	–	–	3rd	3rd	2nd	–	–	4
Ireland	–	–	–	–	–	–	3rd	4th	2
Japan	5th	–	–	5th	–	7th	5th	7th	5
Malaysia	4th	6th	–	–	–	5th	4th	3rd	5
New Zealand	–	4th	–	2nd	1st	–	–	5th	4
Pakistan	–	–	–	–	2nd	–	–	–	1
Poland	–	–	–	–	–	6th	8th	8th	3
South Africa	2nd	3rd	5th	–	5th	3rd	7th	–	6
South Korea	–	2nd	2nd	–	–	–	2nd	1st	4
Spain	–	1st	–	–	–	–	–	–	1
Total	6	6	6	6	8	8	8	8	

== See also ==
- Women's Hockey Champions Challenge I
- Men's Hockey Champions Challenge II
- Hockey Champions Trophy
