= Arun Panchia =

New Zealand field hockey player

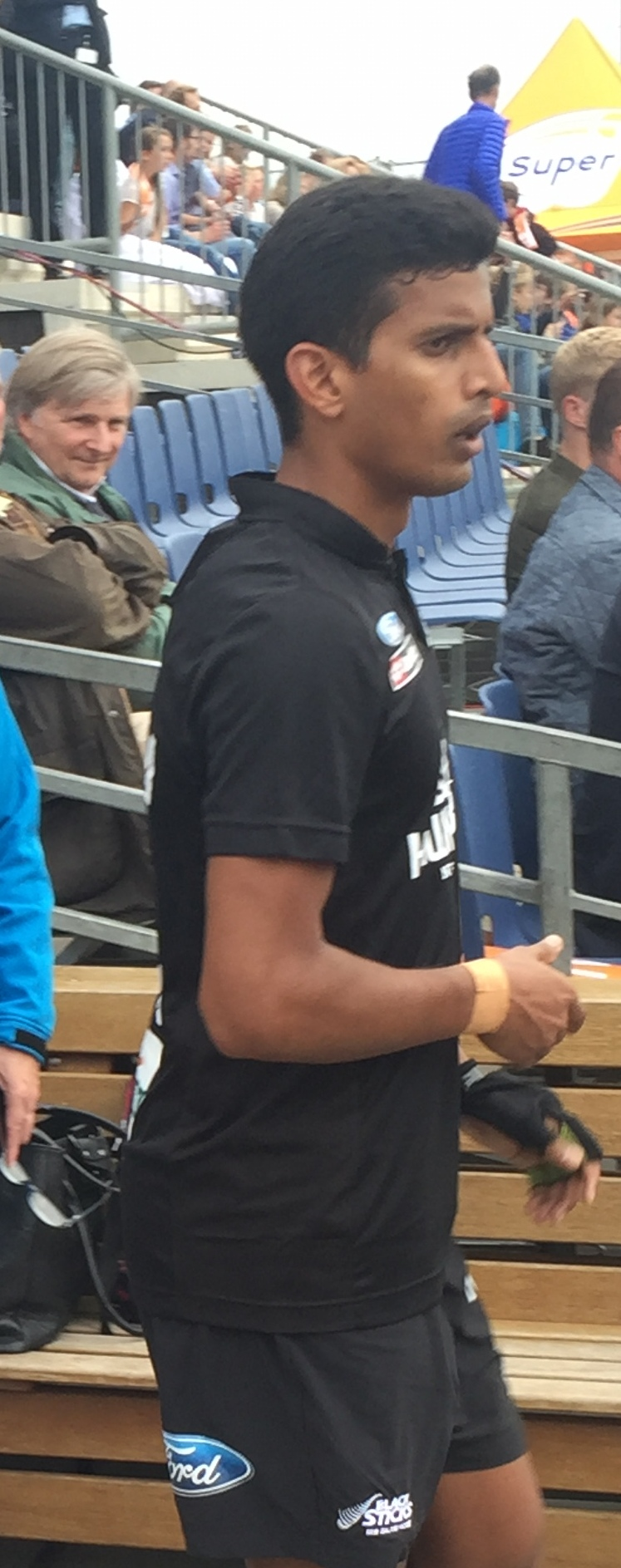
- Interland of the Netherlands against New Zealand on 22 June 2016 in Assen

Personal information
- Born: 22 April 1989 (age 37) Auckland, New Zealand
- Height: 1.80 m (5 ft 11 in)
- Weight: 73 kg (161 lb)

Sport
- Sport: Field hockey
- Position: Midfielder/Defender
- Club: Hauraki Mavericks
National team
Years	Team	Caps	Goals
2009–2020	New Zealand	287	-
Medal record
Representing New Zealand
Commonwealth Games
Bronze medal – third place	2010 Delhi	Team
Silver medal – second place	2018 Gold Coast	Team
Oceania Cup
Silver medal – second place	2013 Stratford
Silver medal – second place	2017 Sydney
Silver medal – second place	2019 Rockhampton

Arun Peter Panchia (born 22 April 1989) is a former New Zealand field hockey player. He earned his first cap for the New Zealand men's national field hockey team in 2009 against Pakistan and retired from international hockey in 2020.

== Playing career ==
Panchia's career spanned over eleven years amassing 287 international caps over his career, retiring as the fifth highest capped Men's Black Sticks player of all time. Panchia competed at the 2016 Summer Olympics in Rio de Janeiro, where the team finished seventh. He also competed at three Commonwealth Games and three Hockey World Cups, winning two Commonwealth Games medals, earning bronze at the 2010 Commonwealth Games in Delhi and silver at the 2018 Commonwealth Games in Gold Coast.

Panchia plays as a defensive midfielder for Auckland in the New Zealand National Hockey League and played in the Netherlands for a season at SCHC. Due to his commitments to the national team, Panchia returned to New Zealand missing the second half of the season.

== Personal life ==
Panchia was born on 22 April 1989 in Auckland to Peter and Ramila Panchia. Both his parents played field hockey at local level. Panchia's siblings are also field hockey players; he is the eldest of four who have played representative hockey. Jared Panchia, represented the national team and Daniel Panchia has represented the national junior team. He has a younger sister, Anjali, who has also taken up the sport. The Panchia family have Gujarati ancestry, with Panchia's great-grandfather emigrating from India to New Zealand in the 1920s.
