= Jamie Dwyer =

Australian field hockey player

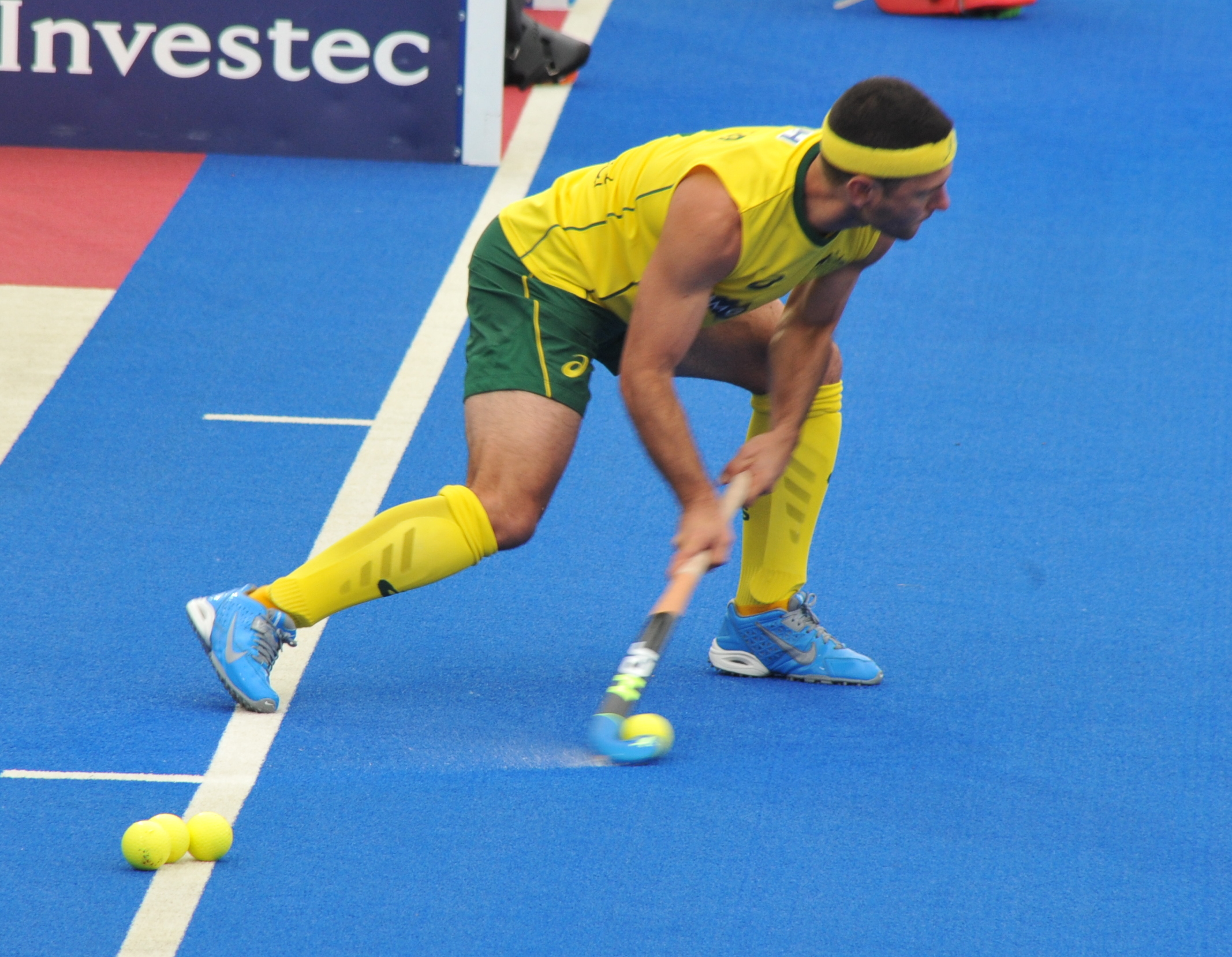

Personal information
- Born: 12 March 1979 (age 47) Rockhampton, Queensland, Australia
- Height: 172 cm (5 ft 8 in)

Sport
- Sport: Field hockey
- Position: Centre
- Club: easts in brisbane
Senior career
Years	Team	Caps	Goals
1998–2010	Queensland Blades	232	-
2009, 2012	Bloemendaal HC	350	-
2013–2015	Punjab Warriors	14	4
2016–2017	Uttar Pradesh Wizards	-	-
National team
Years	Team	Caps	Goals
2001–2016	Australia	365	(243)
Medal record
Men's field hockey
Representing Australia
Olympic Games
Gold medal – first place	2004 Athens	Team
Bronze medal – third place	2008 Beijing	Team
Bronze medal – third place	2012 London	Team
World Cup
Gold medal – first place	2010 New Delhi	Team
Gold medal – first place	2014 The Hague	Team
Silver medal – second place	2002 Kuala Lumpur	Team
Silver medal – second place	2006 Mönchengladbach	Team
Champions Trophy
Gold medal – first place	2005 Chennai	Team
Gold medal – first place	2008 Rotterdam	Team
Gold medal – first place	2009 Melbourne	Team
Gold medal – first place	2010 Mönchengladbach	Team
Gold medal – first place	2011 Auckland	Team
Gold medal – first place	2012 Melbourne	Team
Silver medal – second place	2001 Rotterdam	Team
Silver medal – second place	2003 Amstelveen	Team
Silver medal – second place	2007 Kuala Lumpur	Team
Oceania Cup
Gold medal – first place	2007 Buderim	Team
Gold medal – first place	2011 Hobart	Team
Commonwealth Games
Gold medal – first place	2002 Manchester	Team
Gold medal – first place	2006 Melbourne	Team
Gold medal – first place	2010 Delhi	Team
- Updated on 13 April 2015

Jamie Dwyer OAM (born 12 March 1979) is an Australian field hockey player. He currently plays for YMCC Coastal City Hockey Club in the Melville Toyota League in Perth, Western Australia. He previously played for the Queensland Blades in the Australian Hockey League. He debuted for Australia as a junior player in 1995, and for the senior side in 2001. He played over 365 matches for Australia and scored over 244 goals. He represented Australia at the 2004 Summer Olympics where he won a gold medal and the 2008 Summer Olympics and 2012 Summer Olympics where Australia won bronze medals. He has also represented Australia at the 2006 Commonwealth Games where he won a gold medal and the 2010 Commonwealth Games where he also won gold. He has won silver medals at the 2002 Men's Hockey World Cup and the 2006 Men's Hockey World Cup. He won a gold medal at the 2010 Men's Hockey World Cup and the 2014 Men's Hockey World Cup. He is widely regarded as one of the greatest players to ever play the game.

== Personal ==
Jamie Dwyer was born on 12 March 1979 in Rockhampton, Queensland. His nickname is Foetus. As a child, he played cricket. He is a long time Brisbane Lions fan. His cousin, Matthew Gohdes was a national team teammate when Dwyer played for them. He met his wife-to-be while playing professional hockey in the Netherlands; the couple now have two sons and a daughter.

== Field hockey ==
Jamie Dwyer is a midfielder/striker. In 1999, he had a scholarship with and played for the Australian Institute of Sport team.

=== Club hockey ===
Dwyer has played club hockey in Australia. In 1998, he played for the Easts club in the Brisbane-based competition. He currently plays in the top men's side at YMCC Coastal City Hockey Club in the Melville Toyota League. Since making his debut for the club in 2011, Jamie has played in 4 premierships.

=== Professional hockey ===
Dwyer also played professional hockey in Europe. In 2004, 2005 and 2006, he played professional hockey in the Netherlands, where the hockey season lasts seven months. In 2006, Jaime played for RC Polo Barcelona. In 2009, he played professional hockey in the Netherlands for Bloemendaal H.C. In 2008, he played for Laren in the Netherlands. In 2011, he played club hockey for Mannheim in Germany. In 2012, he played for the Bloemendaal H.C. in the Netherlands. Dwyer later played in India for the Punjab Warriors.

=== State team ===
Dwyer played for the Queensland Blades in the Australian Hockey League, and wore shirt number 1.

=== National team ===
In 1995, Dwyer made his junior national team debut on the U18 and U21 sides. He played for the junior national team in 1996, 1997 and 1998.

Since making his senior side national team debut in 2001, Dwyer played over 300 matches for Australia and scored over 200 goals. In 2001, he won a silver medal in the Champions Trophy competition. In 2002, he won a silver medal at the World Cup. That year, he also won a gold medal at the 2002 Commonwealth Games. His team finished fifth at the 2002 Champions Trophy tournament. In 2003, his team finished second in the Champions Trophy competition. He injured himself in the tournament when he tore the anterior cruciate ligament in his left knee. Going into the Athens Olympics, he was recovering from a knee injury. He scored an extra time goal in the final of the 2004 Olympics, which resulted in Australia winning the gold medal. In 2005, he earned a gold medal at the Champions Trophy competition. In 2006, he won a silver medal at the World Cup. His team finished fourth at the 2006 Champions Trophy tournament. He also won a gold medal at the 2006 Commonwealth Games. By March 2006, he had 122 caps and 79 goals for Australia. In 2007, his team finished second in the Champions Trophy. In December 2007, he was a member of the Kookaburras squad that competed in the Dutch series in Canberra. In 2008, his team finished first in the Champions Trophy competition. He won a bronze medal at the 2008 Summer Olympics. He was carried off the pitch with a hip injury in the middle of the game against Canada that Australia won 6–1. New national team coach Ric Charlesworth named him, a returning member, alongside fourteen total new players who had fewer than 10 national team caps to the squad before in April 2009 in a bid to ready the team for the 2010 Commonwealth Games. In 2009, he participated in two test matche against Spain in Perth in the lead up to the Champions Trophy. In 2009, he won a gold medal at the Men's Hockey Champions Trophy competition. He was a member of the national team in 2010. That year, he was a member of the team that finished first at the Hockey Champions Trophy. In 2010, he also represented Australia at the Commonwealth Games, and played in the game against Pakistan during the group stage. In the gold medal match against India that Australia won 8–0, he captained the side and scored a goal. He also won a gold medal at the World Cup and the Champions Trophy in 2010.

In December 2011, he was named as one of twenty-eight players to be on the 2012 Summer Olympics Australian men's national training squad. This squad will be narrowed in June 2012. He trained with the team from 18 January to mid-March in Perth, Western Australia. In February during the training camp, he played in a four nations test series with the teams being the Kookaburras, Australia A squad, the Netherlands and Argentina. He played for the Kookoaburras against Argentina in the second game of the series where his team won 3–1. He had a short break from training following the test series.

=== Coaching ===
Dwyer has coached field hockey. In 2011, he coached a junior boys team at the YMCC Coastal City Hockey Club. In February 2011, he ran two clinics for young hockey players at the Joondalup Lakers Hockey Club. In 2019, Jamie coached a junior 5/6 boys YMCC Coastal City Hockey Club team.

== International goals ==
No.	Date	Venue	Opponent	Score	Result	Competition
1.	10 May 2001	Melbourne, Australia	New Zealand	3–1	3–1	2001 Men's Oceania Cup
2.	12 May 2001	Melbourne, Australia	New Zealand	1–0	1–1	2001 Men's Oceania Cup
3.	27 February 2002	Kuala Lumpur, Malaysia	Poland	1–0	5–1	2002 Men's Hockey World Cup
3.	1 March 2002	Kuala Lumpur, Malaysia	Cuba	1–0	6–0	2002 Men's Hockey World Cup
4.	7 March 2002	Kuala Lumpur, Malaysia	Netherlands	2–0	4–1	2002 Men's Hockey World Cup
5.	7 March 2002	Kuala Lumpur, Malaysia	Netherlands	4–0	4–1	2002 Men's Hockey World Cup
3.	28 July 2002	Manchester, England	South Africa	2–0	4–1	2002 Commonwealth Games
4.	30 July 2002	Manchester, England	Barbados	6–0	20–1	2002 Commonwealth Games
5.	30 July 2002	Manchester, England	Barbados	8–0	20–1	2002 Commonwealth Games
6.	30 July 2002	Manchester, England	Barbados	19–1	20–1	2002 Commonwealth Games
7.	4 August 2002	Manchester, England	New Zealand	2–0	5–2	2002 Commonwealth Games
8.	4 August 2002	Manchester, England	New Zealand	4–0	5–2	2002 Commonwealth Games
9.	4 August 2002	Manchester, England	New Zealand	5–1	5–2	2002 Commonwealth Games
10.	15 August 2004	Athens, Greece	New Zealand	2–0	4–1	2004 Summer Olympics
11.	15 August 2004	Athens, Greece	New Zealand	3–0	4–1	2004 Summer Olympics
12.	15 August 2004	Athens, Greece	New Zealand	4–1	4–1	2004 Summer Olympics
13.	17 August 2004	Athens, Greece	Argentina	1–2	2–2	2004 Summer Olympics
14.	17 August 2004	Athens, Greece	Argentina	2–2	2–2	2004 Summer Olympics
15.	19 August 2004	Athens, Greece	India	2–1	4–3	2004 Summer Olympics
16.	27 August 2004	Athens, Greece	Netherlands	2–1	2–1 (a.e.t.)	2004 Summer Olympics
17.	17 November 2005	Suva, Fiji	Fiji	14–0	26–0	2005 Men's Oceania Cup
18.	17 November 2005	Suva, Fiji	Fiji	19–0	26–0	2005 Men's Oceania Cup
19.	17 November 2005	Suva, Fiji	Fiji	23–0	26–0	2005 Men's Oceania Cup
20.	17 November 2005	Suva, Fiji	Fiji	24–0	26–0	2005 Men's Oceania Cup
21.	17 November 2005	Suva, Fiji	Fiji	25–0	26–0	2005 Men's Oceania Cup
22.	17 November 2005	Suva, Fiji	Fiji	26–0	26–0	2005 Men's Oceania Cup
23.	22 March 2006	Birmingham, England	New Zealand	1–1	5–2	2006 Commonwealth Games
24.	24 March 2006	Birmingham, England	Malaysia	2–0	6–0	2006 Commonwealth Games
25.	26 March 2006	Birmingham, England	Pakistan	3–0	3–0	2006 Commonwealth Games
26.	12 September 2006	Mönchengladbach, Germany	New Zealand	1–0	7–1	2006 Men's Hockey World Cup
27.	12 September 2006	Mönchengladbach, Germany	New Zealand	6–1	7–1	2006 Men's Hockey World Cup
28.	13 September 2006	Mönchengladbach, Germany	Pakistan	2–0	3–0	2006 Men's Hockey World Cup
29.	15 September 2006	Mönchengladbach, Germany	South Korea	3–2	4––2	2006 Men's Hockey World Cup
30.	11 September 2007	Buderim, Australia	Papua New Guinea	5–0	35–0	2007 Men's Oceania Cup
31.	11 September 2007	Buderim, Australia	Papua New Guinea	7–0	35–0	2007 Men's Oceania Cup
32.	11 September 2007	Buderim, Australia	Papua New Guinea	12–0	35–0	2007 Men's Oceania Cup
33.	11 September 2007	Buderim, Australia	Papua New Guinea	13–0	35–0	2007 Men's Oceania Cup
34.	11 September 2007	Buderim, Australia	Papua New Guinea	14–0	35–0	2007 Men's Oceania Cup
35.	11 September 2007	Buderim, Australia	Papua New Guinea	24–0	35–0	2007 Men's Oceania Cup
36.	11 September 2007	Buderim, Australia	Papua New Guinea	27–0	35–0	2007 Men's Oceania Cup
37.	11 September 2007	Buderim, Australia	Papua New Guinea	29–0	35–0	2007 Men's Oceania Cup
38.	13 August 2008	Beijing, China	South Africa	1–0	10–0	2008 Summer Olympics
39.	13 August 2008	Beijing, China	South Africa	7–0	10–0	2008 Summer Olympics
40.	15 August 2008	Beijing, China	Pakistan	2–1	3–1	2008 Summer Olympics
41.	19 August 2008	Beijing, China	Great Britain	2–1	3–3	2008 Summer Olympics
42.	25 August 2009	Invercargill, New Zealand	Samoa	1–0	26–0	2009 Men's Oceania Cup
43.	25 August 2009	Invercargill, New Zealand	Samoa	10–0	26–0	2009 Men's Oceania Cup
44.	25 August 2009	Invercargill, New Zealand	Samoa	12–0	26–0	2009 Men's Oceania Cup
45.	25 August 2009	Invercargill, New Zealand	Samoa	13–0	26–0	2009 Men's Oceania Cup
46.	25 August 2009	Invercargill, New Zealand	Samoa	14–0	26–0	2009 Men's Oceania Cup
47.	26 August 2009	Invercargill, New Zealand	New Zealand	2–2	5–2	2009 Men's Oceania Cup
48.	26 August 2009	Invercargill, New Zealand	New Zealand	5–2	5–2	2009 Men's Oceania Cup
49.	29 August 2009	Invercargill, New Zealand	New Zealand	3–1	3–1	2009 Men's Oceania Cup
46.	14 October 2010	New Delhi, India	India	7–0	8–0	2010 Commonwealth Games
47.	25 October 2011	Hobart, Australia	New Zealand	2–1	3–3	2011 Men's Oceania Cup
48.	30 July 2012	London, United Kingdom	South Africa	1–0	6–0	2012 Summer Olympics
49.	30 July 2012	London, United Kingdom	South Africa	4–0	6–0	2012 Summer Olympics
50.	30 July 2012	London, United Kingdom	South Africa	5–0	6–0	2012 Summer Olympics
51.	3 August 2012	London, United Kingdom	Argentina	2–0	2–2	2012 Summer Olympics
52.	7 August 2012	London, United Kingdom	Pakistan	6–0	7–0	2012 Summer Olympics
53.	11 August 2012	London, United Kingdom	Great Britain	2–1	3–1	2012 Summer Olympics
54.	17 June 2013	Rotterdam, Netherlands	France	1–0	7–1	2012–13 Men's FIH Hockey World League Semifinals
55.	17 June 2013	Rotterdam, Netherlands	France	2–0	7–1	2012–13 Men's FIH Hockey World League Semifinals
56.	17 June 2013	Rotterdam, Netherlands	France	3–0	7–1	2012–13 Men's FIH Hockey World League Semifinals
57.	17 June 2013	Rotterdam, Netherlands	France	5–1	7–1	2012–13 Men's FIH Hockey World League Semifinals
58.	17 June 2013	Rotterdam, Netherlands	France	7–1	7–1	2012–13 Men's FIH Hockey World League Semifinals
59.	30 October 2013	Stratford, New Zealand	Samoa	4–0	32–0	2013 Men's Oceania Cup
60.	30 October 2013	Stratford, New Zealand	Samoa	11–0	32–0	2013 Men's Oceania Cup
61.	30 October 2013	Stratford, New Zealand	Samoa	20–0	32–0	2013 Men's Oceania Cup
62.	30 October 2013	Stratford, New Zealand	Samoa	26–0	32–0	2013 Men's Oceania Cup
63.	30 October 2013	Stratford, New Zealand	Samoa	30–0	32–0	2013 Men's Oceania Cup
64.	2 November 2013	Stratford, New Zealand	Papua New Guinea	7–0	16–0	2013 Men's Oceania Cup
65.	2 November 2013	Stratford, New Zealand	Papua New Guinea	11–0	16–0	2013 Men's Oceania Cup
66.	21 June 2015	Brasschaat, Belgium	France	3–0	10–0	2014–15 Men's FIH Hockey World League Semifinals
67.	24 June 2015	Brasschaat, Belgium	Pakistan	4–1	6–1	2014–15 Men's FIH Hockey World League Semifinals
68.	28 June 2015	Brasschaat, Belgium	India	2–0	6–2	2014–15 Men's FIH Hockey World League Semifinals
69.	1 July 2015	Brasschaat, Belgium	Ireland	2–0	4–1	2014–15 Men's FIH Hockey World League Semifinals
70.	21 October 2015	Stratford, New Zealand	Fiji	11–0	17–0	2015 Men's Oceania Cup
71.	21 October 2015	Stratford, New Zealand	Fiji	14–0	17–0	2015 Men's Oceania Cup
72.	22 October 2015	Stratford, New Zealand	New Zealand	1–0	3–1	2015 Men's Oceania Cup
73.	24 October 2015	Stratford, New Zealand	Samoa	6–0	36–0	2015 Men's Oceania Cup
74.	24 October 2015	Stratford, New Zealand	Samoa	14–0	36–0	2015 Men's Oceania Cup
75.	24 October 2015	Stratford, New Zealand	Samoa	20–0	36–0	2015 Men's Oceania Cup
76.	24 October 2015	Stratford, New Zealand	Samoa	26–0	36–0	2015 Men's Oceania Cup
77.	24 October 2015	Stratford, New Zealand	Samoa	28–0	36–0	2015 Men's Oceania Cup
78.	24 October 2015	Stratford, New Zealand	Samoa	33–0	36–0	2015 Men's Oceania Cup
79.	25 October 2015	Stratford, New Zealand	New Zealand	2–0	3–2	2015 Men's Oceania Cup
80.	28 November 2015	Raipur, India	Belgium	1–0	1–0	2014–15 Men's FIH Hockey World League Final
81.	2 December 2015	Raipur, India	Germany	2–0	4–1	2014–15 Men's FIH Hockey World League Final
82.	12 August 2016	Rio de Janeiro, Brazil	Brazil	1–0	9–0	2016 Summer Olympics
83.	12 August 2016	Rio de Janeiro, Brazil	Brazil	2–0	9–0	2016 Summer Olympics

== Recognition ==
In 2002, Dwyer was named the Young Hockey Player of the Year by the International Hockey Federation. In 2004 and 2007, he was named the IHF World Player of the Year. In the 2005 Australia Day Honours Dwyer was awarded the Medal of the Order of Australia (OAM). In 2007, he was named the Captain of the World Team. In 2011, he was named the international field hockey player of the year. In 2011, he was named in the World All-Star Team. In 2011, he was inducted into the Australian Institute of Sport 'Best of the Best'. On 18 June 2012, Jamie Dwyer was appointed to lead the number one Australian side in London Olympics. In 2021, Dwyer was inducted into the Sport Australia Hall of Fame.

Awards
Preceded by (Germany) Tibor Weißenborn	FIH Rising Star of the Year; 2002	Succeeded by (Australia) Grant Schubert
Preceded by (Netherlands) Teun de Nooijer	FIH Player of the Year; 2004	Succeeded by (Netherlands) Teun de Nooijer
Preceded by (Netherlands) Teun de Nooijer	FIH Player of the Year; 2007	Succeeded by (Spain) Pol Amat
Preceded by (Spain) Pol Amat	FIH Player of the Year; 2009–2011	Succeeded by (Germany) Moritz Fürste
