= Nick Ross (field hockey) =

New Zealand field hockey player

Personal information
- Full name: Nicholas William Ross
- Born: 26 July 1990 (age 36) Dunedin, New Zealand
- Height: 175 cm (5 ft 9 in)
- Weight: 77 kg (170 lb)

Sport
- Sport: Field hockey
- Position: Midfielder
- Club: Southern Alpiners
National team
Years	Team	Caps	Goals
2013–	New Zealand	133	(4)
Medal record
Men's field hockey
Representing New Zealand
Commonwealth Games
Silver medal – second place	2018 Gold Coast	Team
Oceania Cup
Silver medal – second place	2015 Stratford
Silver medal – second place	2017 Sydney
Silver medal – second place	2019 Rockhampton

Nicholas William Ross (born 26 July 1990) is a New Zealand field hockey player.

== Career ==
=== Club level ===
In the New Zealand National Hockey League, Ross plays hockey for Southern.

=== National team ===
Nick Ross made his debut for the Black Sticks in 2013, at the Sultan Azalan Shah Cup, in Ipoh, Malaysia.

Since his debut, Ross has been a regular inclusion in the Black Sticks side. During his career he has medalled three times, winning silver at the 2018 Commonwealth Games and the 2015 and 2017 Oceania Cups.

His most recent appearance for the national team was during the inaugural tournament of the FIH Pro League, where New Zealand finished in last place.

==== International goals ====
Goal	Date	Location	Opponent	Score	Result	Competition	Ref.
1	11 October 2015	Nga Puna Wai Hockey Stadium, Christchurch, New Zealand	India	1–0	1–1	Test Match	
2	26 November 2016	State Netball and Hockey Centre, Melbourne, Australia	India	1–1	3–2	2016 I.F.O.H.	
3	24 April 2017	Tun Razak Hockey Stadium, Bandar Tun Razak, Malaysia	Malaysia	3–2	3–3	Test Match	
4	14 October 2017	Sydney Olympic Park, Sydney, Australia	PNG	17–0	19–0	2017 Oceania Cup	
5	8 April 2018	Gold Coast Hockey Centre, Gold Coast, Australia	South Africa	6–0	6–0	2018 Commonwealth Games	
