= Field hockey at the 2016 Summer Olympics – Men's tournament =

Men's field hockey at the 2016 Summer Olympics

Tournament details
- Host country: Brazil
- City: Rio de Janeiro
- Dates: 6–18 August 2016
- Teams: 12
- Venue: Olympic Hockey Centre

Final positions
- Champions: Argentina (1st title)
- Runner-up: Belgium
- Third place: Germany

Tournament statistics
- Matches played: 38
- Goals scored: 189 (4.97 per match)
- Top scorer: (Argentina) Gonzalo Peillat (11 goals)

The men's field hockey tournament at the 2016 Summer Olympics was the 23rd edition of the field hockey event for men at the Summer Olympics. It took place over a thirteen-day period beginning on 6 August, and culminated with the medal finals on 18 August. All games were played at the Olympic Hockey Centre in Deodoro, Rio de Janeiro, Brazil.

Argentina won the gold medal for the first time after defeating Belgium 4–2 in the final. Defending champions Germany won the bronze medal by defeating the Netherlands 4–3 on a penalty shoot-out after a 1–1 draw.

The medals for the tournament were presented by René Fasel, Switzerland; Pierre-Olivier Beckers-Vieujant, Belgium; and Gerardo Werthein, Argentina; members of the International Olympic Committee.

== Competition schedule ==
The match schedule of the men's tournament was unveiled on 27 April 2016.

G	Group stage	¼	Quarter-finals	½	Semi-finals	B	Bronze medal match	F	Final

Sat 6	Sun 7	Mon 8	Tue 9	Wed 10	Thu 11	Fri 12	Sat 13	Sun 14	Mon 15	Tue 16	Wed 17	Thu 18	
G	G	G	G	G	G	G		¼		½		B	F

== Competition format ==
The twelve teams in the tournament were divided into two groups of six, with each team initially playing round-robin games within their group. Following the completion of the round-robin stage, the top four teams from each group advance to the quarter-finals. The two semi-final winners meet for the gold medal match, while the semi-final losers play in the bronze medal match.

== Qualification ==
Each of the Continental Champions from five confederations received an automatic berth. Brazil as the host nation qualified automatically but with a rider. Due to the standard of field hockey in Brazil, the International Hockey Federation (FIH) and the International Olympic Committee (IOC) required Brazil to place higher than thirtieth in the FIH World Rankings by the end of 2014 or finish no worse than sixth at the 2015 Pan American Games in order to qualify as host nation. They achieved this by beating the United States on a penalty shoot-out in the quarterfinal, ensuring a top four finish. In addition to the six highest placed teams at the Semifinals of the 2014–15 FIH Hockey World League not already qualified, the following twelve teams, shown with final pre-tournament rankings, will compete in this tournament.

Dates	Event	Location	Qualifier
20 September – 2 October 2014	2014 Asian Games	Incheon, South Korea	India
3–14 June 2015	2014–15 FIH Hockey World League Semifinals	Buenos Aires, Argentina	Germany
3–14 June 2015	2014–15 FIH Hockey World League Semifinals	Buenos Aires, Argentina	Canada
3–14 June 2015	2014–15 FIH Hockey World League Semifinals	Buenos Aires, Argentina	Spain
3–14 June 2015	2014–15 FIH Hockey World League Semifinals	Buenos Aires, Argentina	New Zealand
20 June – 5 July 2015	2014–15 FIH Hockey World League Semifinals	Antwerp, Belgium	Belgium
20 June – 5 July 2015	2014–15 FIH Hockey World League Semifinals	Antwerp, Belgium	Great Britain
20 June – 5 July 2015	2014–15 FIH Hockey World League Semifinals	Antwerp, Belgium	Ireland
21 July 2015	Host nation	Toronto, Canada	Brazil
14–25 July 2015	2015 Pan American Games	Toronto, Canada	Argentina
21–29 August 2015	2015 EuroHockey Nations Championship	(United Kingdom) London, England	Netherlands
21–25 October 2015	2015 Oceania Cup	Stratford, New Zealand	Australia
23 October – 1 November 2015	2015 African Qualifying Tournament	Randburg, South Africa	— (Note: South Africa won the continental qualifier however the team did not participate in the 2016 Olympics. South African Sports Confederation and Olympic Committee (SASCOC) and South African Hockey Association (SAHA) made an agreement on the Rio 2016 Olympics qualification criteria that the Continental Qualification route would not be considered. As a result, New Zealand, as the highest-ranked team from the 2014-15 Hockey World League Semifinals not already qualified, participated instead.)
Total			12

== Group stage ==
All times are local (UTC−3).

=== Group A ===
Pos	Team	Pld	W	D	L	GF	GA	GD	Pts	Qualification
1	Belgium	5	4	0	1	21	5	+16	12	Quarter-finals
2	Spain	5	3	1	1	13	6	+7	10	Quarter-finals
3	Australia	5	3	0	2	13	4	+9	9	Quarter-finals
4	New Zealand	5	2	1	2	17	8	+9	7	Quarter-finals
5	Great Britain	5	1	2	2	14	10	+4	5	
6	Brazil (H)	5	0	0	5	1	46	−45	0	

Source: Rio2016
Rules for classification: 1) Points; 2) Matches won; 3) Goal difference; 4) Goals for; 5) Head-to-head result.
(H) Hosts

6 August 2016
12:30

Belgium	4–1	Great Britain
Truyens 5'; Cosyns 32'; Gougnard 35'; Charlier 56'	Report	Catlin 27'

Umpires:
John Weight (RSA)
Coen van Bunge (NED)

6 August 2016
13:30

Australia	2–1	New Zealand
Ciriello 8'; Gohdes 23'	Report	Child 31'

Umpires:
Christian Blasch (GER)
Germán Montes de Oca (ARG)

6 August 2016
19:30

Spain	7–0	Brazil
Lleonart 16', 42'; Oliva 35'; Romeu 35', 52'; Ruiz 45'; Alegre 55'	Report

Umpires:
Marcin Grochal (POL)
Chen Dekang (CHN)

7 August 2016
17:00

Great Britain	2–2	New Zealand
Condon 2'; Middleton 25'	Report	Russell 14'; Phillips 19'

Umpires:
Marcin Grochal (POL)
Lim Hong Zhen (SIN)

7 August 2016
19:30

Brazil	0–12	Belgium
	Report	Van Aubel 12'; Van Doren 14', 54'; Cosyns 18', 53'; Denayer 25'; Truyens 28'; Boccard 33'; Briels 33'; Dockier 41'; Charlier 48'; Dohmen 51'

Umpires:
Germán Montes de Oca (ARG)
Javed Shaikh (IND)

7 August 2016
20:30

Australia	0–1	Spain
	Report	Casasayas 6'

Umpires:
Christian Blasch (GER)
Coen van Bunge (NED)

9 August 2016
10:00

New Zealand	2–3	Spain
Child 3', 30'	Report	Oliva 1'; Casasayas 10'; Lleonart 60'

Umpires:
Christian Blasch (GER)
Germán Montes de Oca (ARG)

9 August 2016
18:00

Brazil	1–9	Great Britain
Smith 4'	Report	Dixon 9'; Middleton 12', 54'; Jackson 27', 57'; Martin 37'; Ward 47', 59'; Gleghorne 56'

Umpires:
Chen Dekang (CHN)
Coen van Bunge (NED)

9 August 2016
20:30

Belgium	1–0	Australia
Cosyns 16'	Report

Umpires:
John Wright (RSA)
Marcin Grochal (POL)

10 August 2016
19:30

New Zealand	9–0	Brazil
Wilson 15', 19', 34', 41'; Shay 21'; Child 26'; Russell 30'; Jenness 45'; Woods 58'	Report

Umpires:
Javed Shaikh (IND)
Coen van Bunge (NED)

10 August 2016
20:30

Great Britain	1–2	Australia
Jackson 58'	Report	Zalewski 50'; Whetton 55'

Umpires:
Marcin Grochal (POL)
John Wright (RSA)

11 August 2016
13:30

Spain	1–3	Belgium
Quemada 41'	Report	Charlier 6'; Stockbroekx 16'; Charlier 21'

Umpires:
Christian Blasch (GER)
Germán Montes de Oca (ARG)

12 August 2016
17:00

Great Britain	1–1	Spain
Ward 15'	Report	Alegre 9'

Umpires:
Christian Blasch (GER)
Coen van Bunge (NED)

12 August 2016
18:00

Belgium	1–3	New Zealand
Van Aubel 58'	Report	Child 31'; Wilson 37'; Inglis 52'

Umpires:
Germán Montes de Oca (ARG)
John Wright (RSA)

12 August 2016
20:30

Australia	9–0	Brazil
Dwyer 7', 9'; Gohdes 11'; Turner 20', 24', 27'; Dawson 35'; Govers 45', 59'	Report

Umpires:
Javed Shaikh (IND)
Lim Hong Zhen (SIN)

=== Group B ===
Pos	Team	Pld	W	D	L	GF	GA	GD	Pts	Qualification
1	Germany	5	4	1	0	17	10	+7	13	Quarter-finals
2	Netherlands	5	3	1	1	18	6	+12	10	Quarter-finals
3	Argentina	5	2	2	1	14	12	+2	8	Quarter-finals
4	India	5	2	1	2	9	9	0	7	Quarter-finals
5	Ireland	5	1	0	4	10	16	−6	3	
6	Canada	5	0	1	4	7	22	−15	1	

Source: Rio2016
Rules for classification: 1) Points; 2) Matches won; 3) Goal difference; 4) Goals for; 5) Head-to-head result.

6 August 2016
10:00

Argentina	3–3	Netherlands
Vila 29', 49'; Paredes 54'	Report	Hertzberger 18'; Van der Weerden 36'; Van Ass 43'

Umpires:
Martin Madden (GBR)
Adam Kearns (AUS)

6 August 2016
11:00

India	3–2	Ireland
Raghunath 15+'; Ru. Singh 27', 49'	Report	Shimmins 45'; Harte 56'

Umpires:
Murray Grime (AUS)
Paco Vázquez (ESP)

6 August 2016
18:00

Canada	2–6	Germany
Pearson 11'; Pereira 39'	Report	Fürste 4', 33'; Wellen 6', 46'; Müller 14'; Butt 26'

Umpires:
Marcelo Servetto (ESP)
Simon Taylor (NZL)

7 August 2016
18:00

Netherlands	5–0	Ireland
van der Weerden 7', 40'; Croon 8'; Pruijser 42'; Hertzberger 60'	Report

Umpires:
Nathan Stagno (GBR)
Tim Pullman (AUS)

8 August 2016
11:00

Germany	2–1	India
Wellen 18'; Rühr 60'	Report	Ru. Singh 23'

Umpires:
Tim Pullman (AUS)
Martin Madden (GBR)

8 August 2016
12:30

Canada	1–3	Argentina
Tupper 55'	Report	Paredes 13'; Peillat 46', 51'

Umpires:
Adam Kearns (AUS)
Simon Taylor (NZL)

9 August 2016
11:00

Argentina	1–2	India
Peillat 49'	Report	C. Singh 8'; K. Singh 35'

Umpires:
Paco Vázquez (ESP)
Simon Taylor (NZL)

9 August 2016
12:30

Germany	3–2	Ireland
Fürste 13', 38'; Zwicker 42'	Report	Magee 26'; Darling 59'

Umpires:
Marcelo Servetto (ESP)
Lim Hong Zhen (SIN)

9 August 2016
13:30

Netherlands	7–0	Canada
Van Ass 9'; Van der Weerden 25', 52', 60'; Hertzberger 29', 36'; Kemperman 58'	Report

Umpires:
Murray Grime (AUS)
Nathan Stagno (GBR)

11 August 2016
10:00

Netherlands	2–1	India
Hofman 35'; Van der Weerden 54'	Report	Raghunath 38'

Umpires:
Murray Grime (AUS)
Martin Madden (GBR)

11 August 2016
11:00

Ireland	4–2	Canada
O'Donoghue 1', 28'; Caruth 29'; Darling 57'	Report	Tupper 37', 50'

Umpires:
Marcelo Servetto (ESP)
Nathan Stagno (GBR)

11 August 2016
12:30

Argentina	4–4	Germany
Vila 4'; P. Ibarra 29'; Peillat 48'; M. Rey 57'	Report	Herzbruch 15'; Wesley 24'; Grambusch 28'; Müller 60'

Umpires:
Adam Kearns (AUS)
Paco Vázquez (ESP)

12 August 2016
12:30

India	2–2	Canada
A. Singh 33'; Ra. Singh 41'	Report	Tupper 33', 52'

Umpires:
Nathan Stagno (GBR)
Adam Kearns (AUS)

12 August 2016
13:30

Germany	2–1	Netherlands
Fuchs 7'; Grambusch 33'	Report	Van As 44'

Umpires:
Murray Grime (AUS)
Marcelo Servetto (ESP)

12 August 2016
19:30

Ireland	2–3	Argentina
Jermyn 25'; O'Donoghue 51'	Report	Saladino 8'; Peillat 27', 51'

Umpires:
Simon Taylor (NZL)
Paco Vázquez (ESP)

== Knockout stage ==
=== Bracket ===
Quarter-finals
14 August
Belgium	3
India	1
14 August
Netherlands	4
Australia	0
14 August
Spain	1
Argentina	2
14 August
Germany	3
New Zealand	2

Semi-finals
16 August
Belgium	3
Netherlands	1
16 August
Argentina	5
Germany	2

Gold medal match
18 August
Belgium	2
Argentina	4
Bronze medal match
18 August
Netherlands	1 (3)
Germany (p.s.o.)	1 (4)

=== Quarter-finals ===
14 August 2016
10:00

Spain	1–2	Argentina
Quemada 57'	Report	Peillat 15'; Gilardi 59'

Umpires:
Martin Madden (GBR)
Adam Kearns (AUS)

14 August 2016
12:30

Belgium	3–1	India
Dockier 34', 45'; Boon 50'	Report	A. Singh 15'

Umpires:
Simon Taylor (NZL)
Nathan Stagno (GBR)

14 August 2016
18:00

Netherlands	4–0	Australia
Bakker 1'; De Voogd 28'; Verga 33'; Van der Weerden 49'	Report

Umpires:
Christian Blasch (GER)
Paco Vázquez (ESP)

14 August 2016
20:30

Germany	3–2	New Zealand
Fürste 56', 60'; Fuchs 60'	Report	Inglis 18'; McAleese 49'

Umpires:
Marcelo Servetto (ESP)
Murray Grime (AUS)

=== Semi-finals ===
16 August 2016
12:00

Argentina	5–2	Germany
Peillat 9', 12', 28'; Menini 36'; Vila 47'	Report	Fürste 51'; Rühr 58'

Umpires:
Marcin Grochal (POL)
John Wright (RSA)

16 August 2016
17:00

Belgium	3–1	Netherlands
Truyens 25'; Dohmen 29' van Aubel 46'	Report	van der Weerden 29'

Umpires:
Germán Montes de Oca (ARG)
Murray Grime (AUS)

=== Bronze medal match ===
18 August 2016
12:00

Netherlands	1–1	Germany
Croon 35'	Report	M. Grambusch 42'
Penalties
Bakker (penalty shoot-out missed); Kemperman (penalty shoot-out scored); Hertzberger (penalty shoot-out scored); Van Ass (penalty shoot-out scored); De Wijn (penalty shoot-out missed)	3–4	(penalty shoot-out scored) Hauke; (penalty shoot-out scored) M. Grambusch; (penalty shoot-out scored) Herzbruch; (penalty shoot-out scored) Butt

Umpires:
Marcelo Servetto (ESP)
Martin Madden (GBR)

=== Gold medal match ===
18 August 2016
17:00

Belgium	2–4	Argentina
Cosyns 3'; Boccard 45'	Report	P. Ibarra 12'; Ortiz 15'; Peillat 22'; Mazzilli 60'

Umpires:
John Wright (RSA)
Christian Blasch (GER)

Stadium: Olympic Hockey Centre
Attendance: 8,000

== Final ranking ==
As per statistical convention in field hockey, matches decided in regular time are counted as wins and losses, while matches decided by penalty shoot-outs are counted as draws.

Pos	Team	Pld	W	D	L	GF	GA	GD	Pts	Final result
1st place, gold medalist(s)	Argentina	8	5	2	1	25	17	+8	17	Gold Medal
2nd place, silver medalist(s)	Belgium	8	6	0	2	29	11	+18	18	Silver Medal
3rd place, bronze medalist(s)	Germany	8	5	2	1	23	18	+5	17	Bronze Medal
4	Netherlands	8	4	2	2	24	10	+14	14	Fourth place
5	Spain	6	3	1	2	14	8	+6	10	Eliminated in quarter-finals
6	Australia	6	3	0	3	13	8	+5	9	Eliminated in quarter-finals
7	New Zealand	6	2	1	3	19	11	+8	7	Eliminated in quarter-finals
8	India	6	2	1	3	10	12	−2	7	Eliminated in quarter-finals
9	Great Britain	5	1	2	2	14	10	+4	5	Eliminated in group stage
10	Ireland	5	1	0	4	10	16	−6	3	Eliminated in group stage
11	Canada	5	0	1	4	7	22	−15	1	Eliminated in group stage
12	Brazil (H)	5	0	0	5	1	46	−45	0	Eliminated in group stage

Source: Rio2016
(H) Hosts

== Goalscorers ==
There were 189 goals scored in 38 matches, for an average of 4.97 goals per match.

11 goals

- (Argentina) Gonzalo Peillat

9 goals

- (Netherlands) Mink van der Weerden

7 goals

- (Germany) Moritz Fürste

5 goals

- (Belgium) Tanguy Cosyns
- (Canada) Scott Tupper
- (New Zealand) Simon Child
- (New Zealand) Nick Wilson

4 goals

- (Argentina) Lucas Vila
- (Belgium) Cédric Charlier
- (Netherlands) Jeroen Hertzberger

3 goals

- (Australia) Glenn Turner
- (Belgium) Florent van Aubel
- (Belgium) Sébastien Dockier
- (Belgium) Jérôme Truyens
- (Germany) Mats Grambusch
- (Germany) Niklas Wellen
- (United Kingdom) Ashley Jackson
- (United Kingdom) Barry Middleton
- (United Kingdom) Samuel Ward
- (India) Rupinder Pal Singh
- (Republic of Ireland) Shane O'Donoghue
- (Netherlands) Seve van Ass
- (Spain) Xavi Lleonart

2 goals

- (Argentina) Pedro Ibarra
- (Argentina) Matías Paredes
- (Australia) Jamie Dwyer
- (Australia) Matthew Gohdes
- (Australia) Blake Govers
- (Belgium) Gauthier Boccard
- (Belgium) John-John Dohmen
- (Belgium) Arthur van Doren
- (Germany) Florian Fuchs
- (Germany) Mathias Müller
- (Germany) Christopher Rühr
- (India) V. R. Raghunath
- (India) Akashdeep Singh
- (Republic of Ireland) Michael Darling
- (Netherlands) Jorrit Croon
- (New Zealand) Hugo Inglis
- (New Zealand) Kane Russell
- (Spain) David Alegre
- (Spain) Álex Casasayas
- (Spain) Roc Oliva
- (Spain) Pau Quemada
- (Spain) Josep Romeu

1 goal

- (Argentina) Juan Ignacio Gilardi
- (Argentina) Agustín Mazzilli
- (Argentina) Joaquín Menini
- (Argentina) Ignacio Ortiz
- (Argentina) Matías Rey
- (Argentina) Juan Saladino
- (Australia) Chris Ciriello
- (Australia) Matthew Dawson
- (Australia) Jacob Whetton
- (Australia) Aran Zalewski
- (Belgium) Thomas Briels
- (Belgium) Tom Boon
- (Belgium) Félix Denayer
- (Belgium) Simon Gougnard
- (Belgium) Emmanuel Stockbroekx
- (Brazil) Stephane Smith
- (Canada) Mark Pearson
- (Canada) Keegan Pereira
- (Germany) Linus Butt
- (Germany) Timm Herzbruch
- (Germany) Christopher Wesley
- (Germany) Martin Zwicker
- (United Kingdom) Nicholas Catlin
- (United Kingdom) David Condon
- (United Kingdom) Adam Dixon
- (United Kingdom) Mark Gleghorne
- (United Kingdom) Harry Martin
- (India) Chinglensana Singh
- (India) Kothajit Singh
- (India) Ramandeep Singh
- (Republic of Ireland) Peter Caruth
- (Republic of Ireland) Conor Harte
- (Republic of Ireland) John Jermyn
- (Republic of Ireland) Eugene Magee
- (Republic of Ireland) Kirk Shimmins
- (Netherlands) Billy Bakker
- (Netherlands) Rogier Hofman
- (Netherlands) Robbert Kempermann
- (Netherlands) Mirco Pruijser
- (Netherlands) Valentin Verga
- (Netherlands) Bob de Voogd
- (New Zealand) Stephen Jenness
- (New Zealand) Shea McAleese
- (New Zealand) Shay Neal
- (New Zealand) Hayden Phillips
- (New Zealand) Nic Woods
- (Spain) Viçens Ruiz
