= Jared Panchia =

New Zealand field hockey player

Personal information
- Full name: Jared Kiran Panchia
- Born: 18 October 1993 (age 33) Auckland, New Zealand
- Height: 1.70 m (5 ft 7 in)

Sport
- Sport: Field hockey
- Position: Forward/Midfielder
- Club: Auckland
Senior career
| Years | Team | Caps | Goals |
| – | Auckland | - | - |
National team
| Years | Team | Caps | Goals |
| 2013–2014 | New Zealand U21 | 45 | - |
| 2013– | New Zealand | 139 | (26) |
Medal record
Men's field hockey
Representing New Zealand
Commonwealth Games
| Silver medal – second place | 2018 Gold Coast | Team |
Oceania Cup
| Silver medal – second place | 2013 Stratford |
| Silver medal – second place | 2017 Sydney |
| Silver medal – second place | 2019 Rockhampton |
- Updated on 24 July 2021

Jared Kiran Panchia (born 18 October 1993) is a New Zealand field hockey player who plays as a forward or midfielder for the New Zealand national team.

== Life and career ==
Panchia was born on 18 October 1993 in Auckland to Peter Panchia and Ramila. Both his parents played field hockey at local level. Panchia's siblings are also field hockey players; his elder brother Arun Panchia has captained the national side, while younger brother Daniel Panchia has represented the national junior team. He has a younger sister, Anjali, who has also taken up the sport. The Panchia family have Gujarati ancestry, with Panchia's great-grandfather emigrating from India to New Zealand in the 1920s.

Panchia was part of the New Zealand U21 squad that took part in the 2013 Men's Hockey Junior World Cup in New Delhi. He made his senior team debut the same year and was the youngest member of the national squad at the 2014 Men's Hockey World Cup in The Hague. Panchia was part of two Oceania Cup silver medal-winning teams: 2013 in Stratford and 2017 in Sydney.
