= 2007 Men's Oceania Cup =

Field hockey tournament

2007 Oceania Cup
Tournament details
- Host country: Australia
- City: Buderim
- Dates: 11–16 September
- Venue: Sunshine Coast Hockey Centre

Final positions
- Champions: Australia (5th title)
- Runner-up: Australia
- Third place: Papua New Guinea

Tournament statistics
- Matches played: 4
- Goals scored: 81 (20.25 per match)
- Top scorer: (New Zealand) Simon Child (11 goals)

The 2007 Men's Oceania Cup was the fifth edition of the men's field hockey tournament. It was held from 11 to 16 September in Buderim.

The tournament served as a qualifier for the 2008 Olympic Games.

Australia won the tournament for the fifth time, defeating New Zealand 3–1 in the final.

== Teams ==
- Australia
- New Zealand
- Papua New Guinea

== Results ==
All times are local (AEST).

=== Preliminary round ===
==== Pool ====
Pos	Team	Pld	W	D	L	GF	GA	GD	Pts	Qualification
1	Australia (H)	2	2	0	0	37	1	+36	6	Advanced to Final
2	New Zealand	2	1	0	1	40	2	+38	3	Advanced to Final
3	Papua New Guinea	2	0	0	2	0	74	−74	0	

Source: Hockey Australia
Rules for classification: 1) points; 2) goal difference; 3) goals scored; 4) head-to-head result.
(H) Hosts

==== Fixtures ====
11 September 2007
20:30

Australia	35–0	Papua New Guinea
Naylor 3', 13', 15', 53', 55', 60', 69'; Schubert 4', 11', 22'; Hopkins 8'; Knowles 9'; Dwyer 10', 13', 19', 20', 21', 42', 54', 56'; Smith 17', 18', 35', 57', 61'; Guest 24', 29', 39', 49'; Butler 25'; Brooks 33', 34'; Eglington 42', 59'; De Young 58'	Report

Umpires:
Nigel Iggo (NZL)
Satinder Kumar (IND)

12 September 2007
20:30

Papua New Guinea	0–39	New Zealand
	Report	McAleese 1'; Burrows 3', 8', 23', 27', 32', 44', 56', 69'; Kosoof 3', 39', 40'; Shaw 6', 14', 30', 32', 59', 61', 65'; Nation 6', 57'; Child 15', 33', 34', 35', 37', 43', 45', 48', 55', 64', 65'; Collier 20', 49'; Peterson 31', 38', 51'; Archibald 54'; Couzins 70'

Umpires:
David Leiper (SCO)
Timothy Pullman (AUS)

14 September 2007
20:30

New Zealand	1–2	Australia
Collins 37'	Report	Hopkins 22'; Brooks 66'

Umpires:
Satinder Kumar (IND)
David Leiper (SCO)

=== Classification round ===
==== Final ====
16 September 2007
14:00

Australia	3–1	New Zealand
Guest 17'; George 38'; Brooks 58'	Report	Kosoof 33'

Umpires:
David Leiper (SCO)
Satinder Kumar (IND)

== Statistics ==
=== Final standings ===
As per statistical convention in field hockey, matches decided in extra time are counted as wins and losses, while matches decided by penalty shoot-outs are counted as draws.

Pos	Team	Pld	W	D	L	GF	GA	GD	Pts	Status
1st place, gold medalist(s)	Australia (H)	3	3	0	0	40	2	+38	9	Qualified for 2008 Olympic Games
2nd place, silver medalist(s)	New Zealand	3	1	0	2	41	5	+36	3	Qualified for Olympic Qualifiers
3rd place, bronze medalist(s)	Papua New Guinea	2	0	0	2	0	74	−74	0	

Source: Hockey Australia
(H) Hosts

=== Goalscorers ===
There were 81 goals scored in 4 matches, for an average of 20.2 goals per match.

11 goals

- (New Zealand) Simon Child

8 goals

- (Australia) Jamie Dwyer
- (New Zealand) Phil Burrows

7 goals

- (Australia) Matthew Naylor
- (New Zealand) Hayden Shaw

5 goals

- (Australia) David Guest
- (Australia) Andrew Smith

4 goals

- (Australia) Travis Brooks
- (New Zealand) David Kosoof

3 goals

- (Australia) Grant Schubert
- (New Zealand) Jan Peterson

2 goals

- (Australia) Nathan Eglington
- (Australia) Aaron Hopkins
- (New Zealand) Benjamin Collier
- (New Zealand) James Nation

1 goal

- (Australia) Dean Butler
- (Australia) Bevan George
- (Australia) Mark Knowles
- (Australia) Liam de Young
- (New Zealand) Ryan Archibald
- (New Zealand) Bryce Collins
- (New Zealand) Dean Couzins
- (New Zealand) Shea McAleese

== See also ==
- 2007 Women's Oceania Cup
