= Blake Govers =

Australian field hockey player

- Govers in 2021

Personal information
- Born: 6 July 1996 (age 30) Wollongong, New South Wales, Australia
- Height: 186 cm (6 ft 1 in)
- Weight: 84 kg (185 lb)

Sport
- Sport: Field hockey
- Position: Forward
- Club: NSW Pride
Senior career
Years	Team	Caps	Goals
2014–2018	NSW Waratahs	25	34
2014–2015	Wimbledon	-	-
2016–2017	Bloemendaal	-	-
2019–	NSW Pride	5	12
National team
Years	Team	Caps	Goals
2012–2016	Australia U–21	27	(27)
2015–	Australia	185	(170)
Medal record
Men's field hockey
Representing Australia
Olympic Games
Silver medal – second place	2020 Tokyo	Team
World Cup
Bronze medal – third place	2018 Bhubaneswar
Commonwealth Games
Gold medal – first place	2022 Birmingham	Team
FIH Pro League
Gold medal – first place	2019 Amstelveen
Champions Trophy
Gold medal – first place	2016 London
Gold medal – first place	2018 Breda
Hockey World League
Gold medal – first place	2016–17 Bhubaneswar	Team
Oceania Cup
Gold medal – first place	2015 Stratford
Gold medal – first place	2017 Sydney
Gold medal – first place	2019 Rockhampton
Gold medal – first place	2023 Whangārei
Gold medal – first place	2025 Darwin

Blake Govers (born 6 July 1996) is an Australian field hockey player who plays as a forward for the NSW Pride in the Hockey One League and the Australian national team.

He is the younger brother of former international hockey player Kieran Govers. He coaches a group of young female athletes at the Southern River Hockey Club, based in the south of Perth, WA.

== International career ==
He competed in the men's field hockey tournament at the 2016 Summer Olympics and in the 2018 Men's Hockey World Cup. At the 2018 World Cup he was the joint-topscorer with seven goals. He was the topscorer of the 2019 FIH Pro League as he scored 12 goals in 14 matches for Australia. In December 2019, he was nominated for the FIH Rising Star of the Year Award.

Govers was selected in the Kookaburras Olympics squad for the Tokyo 2020 Olympics. The team reached the final for the first time since 2004 but couldn't achieve gold, beaten by Belgium in a shootout.

== Club career ==
During the 2014–15 season, Govers played for Wimbledon in England, where he scored five goals in the championship final. He also played in the Netherlands for Bloemendaal in the 2016–17 season.

== International goals ==
No.	Date	Venue	Opponent	Score	Result	Competition
1.	21 October 2015	Stratford, New Zealand	Fiji	1–0	17–0	2015 Men's Oceania Cup
2.	21 October 2015	Stratford, New Zealand	Fiji	5–0	17–0	2015 Men's Oceania Cup
3.	21 October 2015	Stratford, New Zealand	Fiji	16–0	17–0	2015 Men's Oceania Cup
4.	24 October 2015	Stratford, New Zealand	Samoa	19–0	36–0	2015 Men's Oceania Cup
5.	24 October 2015	Stratford, New Zealand	Samoa	31–0	36–0	2015 Men's Oceania Cup
86.	7 March 2020	Perth, Australia	Argentina	2–0	5–1	2020–21 Men's FIH Pro League
87.	7 March 2020	Perth, Australia	Argentina	3–0	5–1	2020–21 Men's FIH Pro League
88.	26 June 2021	Perth, Australia	New Zealand	4–2	7–3	2020–21 Men's FIH Pro League
89.	27 June 2021	Perth, Australia	New Zealand	2–0	2–0	2020–21 Men's FIH Pro League
90.	24 July 2021	Tokyo, Japan	Japan	3–3	5–3	2020 Summer Olympics
91.	25 July 2021	Tokyo, Japan	India	5–1	7–1	2020 Summer Olympics
92.	25 July 2021	Tokyo, Japan	India	6–1	7–1	2020 Summer Olympics
93.	27 July 2021	Tokyo, Japan	Argentina	1–1	5–2	2020 Summer Olympics
94.	27 July 2021	Tokyo, Japan	Argentina	3–1	5–2	2020 Summer Olympics
95.	28 July 2021	Tokyo, Japan	New Zealand	3–1	4–2	2020 Summer Olympics
96.	3 August 2021	Tokyo, Japan	Germany	2–1	3–1	2020 Summer Olympics
136.	11 February 2024	Bhubaneswar, India	Spain	3–0	4–3	2023–24 Men's FIH Pro League
137.	15 February 2024	Bhubaneswar, India	India	1–1	6–4	2023–24 Men's FIH Pro League
138.	15 February 2024	Bhubaneswar, India	India	2–1	6–4	2023–24 Men's FIH Pro League
139.	16 February 2024	Bhubaneswar, India	Netherlands	1–3	5–4	2023–24 Men's FIH Pro League
140.	16 February 2024	Bhubaneswar, India	Netherlands	4–3	5–4	2023–24 Men's FIH Pro League
141.	22 February 2024	Rourkela, India	Ireland	1–0	4–1	2023–24 Men's FIH Pro League
142.	22 February 2024	Rourkela, India	Ireland	3–1	4–1	2023–24 Men's FIH Pro League
143.	24 February 2024	Rourkela, India	India	1–1	2–2 (0–3 p)	2023–24 Men's FIH Pro League
144.	1 June 2024	Antwerp, Belgium	Argentina	4–3	4–3	2023–24 Men's FIH Pro League
145.	2 June 2024	Antwerp, Belgium	Belgium	1–0	4–4 (2–3 p)	2023–24 Men's FIH Pro League
146.	4 June 2024	London, Great Britain	Great Britain	1–1	3–2	2023–24 Men's FIH Pro League
147.	4 June 2024	London, Great Britain	Great Britain	3–2	3–2	2023–24 Men's FIH Pro League
148.	27 July 2024	Paris, France	Argentina	1–0	1–0	2024 Summer Olympics
149.	29 July 2024	Paris, France	Ireland	2–1	2–1	2024 Summer Olympics
150.	30 July 2024	Paris, France	Belgium	2–5	2–6	2024 Summer Olympics
151.	1 August 2024	Paris, France	New Zealand	2–0	5–0	2024 Summer Olympics
152.	1 August 2024	Paris, France	New Zealand	4–0	5–0	2024 Summer Olympics
153.	1 August 2024	Paris, France	New Zealand	5–0	5–0	2024 Summer Olympics
154.	2 August 2024	Paris, France	India	2–3	2–3	2024 Summer Olympics
