= James Coughlan (field hockey) =

New Zealand field hockey player

Personal information
- Born: 28 August 1990 (age 36)
- Height: 1.83 m (6 ft 0 in)

Sport
- Sport: Field hockey
National team
Years	Team	Caps	Goals
–	New Zealand		-
Medal record
Men's field hockey
Representing New Zealand
Oceania Cup
Silver medal – second place	2017 Sydney	Men's team

James Coughlan (born 28 August 1990) is a New Zealand field hockey player. He represented his country at the 2016 Summer Olympics in Rio de Janeiro, where the men's team came seventh.
