= 2014 Men's Hockey World Cup =

Field hockey tournament in The Hague, Netherlands

Wereldkampioenschap hockey mannen 2014

Tournament details
- Host country: Netherlands
- City: The Hague
- Dates: 31 May – 15 June
- Teams: 12 (from 5 confederations)
- Venue: Kyocera Stadion

Final positions
- Champions: Australia (3rd title)
- Runner-up: Netherlands
- Third place: Argentina

Tournament statistics
- Matches played: 38
- Goals scored: 162 (4.26 per match)
- Top scorer: (Argentina) Gonzalo Peillat (10 goals)
- Best player: (Australia) Mark Knowles

Location of the World Cup venue

The 2014 Men's Hockey World Cup was the 13th edition of the Hockey World Cup, the quadrennial world championship for men's national field hockey teams organized by the FIH. It was held from 31 May to 15 June 2014 at the Kyocera Stadion in The Hague, Netherlands. Simultaneously with the women's tournament. It was the third time that the Netherlands hosted the World Cup after 1973 and 1998.

Defending champions Australia won the tournament for the third time after defeating the Netherlands 6–1 in the final. A capacity crowd of 14,472 attended the final.

Argentina won the third place match by defeating England 2–0 to claim their first ever World Cup medal.

== Bidding ==
The host was announced on 11 November 2010 during the FIH Congress and Forum in Montreux, Switzerland after FIH received bids from The Hague and London.

== Qualification ==
Each of the continental champions from five confederations and the host nation received an automatic berth. In addition to the six highest placed teams at the Semifinals of the 2012–13 FIH Hockey World League not already qualified, the following twelve teams, shown with final pre-tournament rankings, will compete in this tournament.

| Dates | Event | Location | Quotas | Qualifier(s) |
|---|---|---|---|---|
| 11 November 2010 | Host nation | | 1 | Netherlands (3) |
| 13–23 June 2013 | 2012–13 Hockey World League Semifinals | Rotterdam, Netherlands | 4 | Belgium (5); New Zealand (6); Spain (10); India (8) |
| 29 June–7 July 2013 | 2012–13 Hockey World League Semifinals | Johor Bahru, Malaysia | 2 | England (4); Malaysia (13) |
| 10–17 August 2013 | 2013 Pan American Cup | Brampton, Canada | 1 | Argentina (11) |
| 17–25 August 2013 | 2013 EuroHockey Championship | Boom, Belgium | 1 | Germany (2) |
| 24 August–1 September 2013 | 2013 Asia Cup | Ipoh, Malaysia | 1 | South Korea (7) |
| 28 October–3 November 2013 | 2013 Oceania Cup | Stratford, New Zealand | 1 | Australia (1) |
| 18–23 November 2013 | 2013 Africa Cup of Nations | Nairobi, Kenya | 1 | South Africa (12) |
| Total | | | 12 | |

== Umpires ==
17 umpires were appointed by the FIH for this tournament.

- Christian Blasch (GER)
- Marcin Grochal (POL)
- Hamish Jamson (ENG)
- Adam Kearns (AUS)
- Kim Hong-lae (KOR)
- Martin Madden (SCO)
- Germán Montes de Oca (ARG)
- Tim Pullman (AUS)
- Raghu Prasad (IND)
- Javed Shaikh (IND)
- Gary Simmonds (RSA)
- Nathan Stagno (GIB)
- Simon Taylor (NZL)
- Roel van Eert (NED)
- Paco Vázquez (ESP)
- Roderick Wijsmuller (NED)
- John Wright (RSA)

== First round ==
All times are Central European Summer Time (UTC+02:00)

=== Pool A ===
| Pos | Team | Pld | W | D | L | GF | GA | GD | Pts | Qualification |
|---|---|---|---|---|---|---|---|---|---|---|
| 1 | Australia | 5 | 5 | 0 | 0 | 19 | 1 | +18 | 15 | Semi-finals |
| 2 | England | 5 | 3 | 1 | 1 | 8 | 9 | −1 | 10 | Semi-finals |
| 3 | Belgium | 5 | 3 | 0 | 2 | 17 | 12 | +5 | 9 | Fifth place game |
| 4 | Spain | 5 | 1 | 2 | 2 | 9 | 12 | −3 | 5 | Seventh place game |
| 5 | India | 5 | 1 | 1 | 3 | 7 | 12 | −5 | 4 | Ninth place game |
| 6 | Malaysia | 5 | 0 | 0 | 5 | 6 | 20 | −14 | 0 | Eleventh place game |

Source: FIH
Rules for classification: 1) points; 2) goal difference; 3) goals scored; 4) head-to-head result.

31 May 2014
10:30

| Australia | 4–0 | Malaysia |
|---|---|---|
| Turner 25', 54'; Ockenden 50'; Dwyer 52' | Report |

Kyocera Stadion
Umpires:
Roel van Eert (NED)
Kim Hong-lae (KOR)

31 May 2014
16:00

| Belgium | 3–2 | India |
|---|---|---|
| van Aubel 34'; Gougnard 56'; Dohmen 70' | Report | Mandeep 45'; Akashdeep 50' |

Kyocera Stadion
Umpires:
John Wright (RSA)
Nathan Stagno (GIB)

31 May 2014
17:30

| England | 1–1 | Spain |
|---|---|---|
| Brogdon 6' | Report | Tubau 37' |

GreenFields Stadium
Umpires:
Christian Blasch (GER)
Gary Simmonds (RSA)

2 June 2014
13:00

| Australia | 3–0 | Spain |
|---|---|---|
| Deavin 2'; Knowles 10'; Govers 33' | Report |

Kyocera Stadion
Umpires:
Simon Taylor (NZL)
Marcin Grochal (POL)

2 June 2014
16:00

| England | 2–1 | India |
|---|---|---|
| Gleghorne 27'; Mantell 70' | Report | Dharamvir 30' |

Kyocera Stadion
Umpires:
Martin Madden (SCO)
Germán Montes de Oca (ARG)

2 June 2014
17:30

| Malaysia | 2–6 | Belgium |
|---|---|---|
| Razie 5', 15' | Report | Boon 14', 23', 31', 45'; Cosyns 37'; Dohmen 56' |

GreenFields Stadium
Umpires:
Gary Simmonds (RSA)
Roderick Wijsmuller (NED)

5 June 2014
13:00

| Malaysia | 0–2 | England |
|---|---|---|
| | Report | Gleghorne 4'; Jackson 67' |

Kyocera Stadion
Umpires:
John Wright (RSA)
Kim Hong-lae (KOR)

5 June 2014
16:00

| Belgium | 1–3 | Australia |
|---|---|---|
| Dockier 46' | Report | Ciriello 7'; Whetton 9'; Ockenden 36' |

Kyocera Stadion
Umpires:
Christian Blasch (GER)
Germán Montes de Oca (ARG)

5 June 2014
17:30

| India | 1–1 | Spain |
|---|---|---|
| Rupinder 28' | Report | Ruiz 34' |

GreenFields Stadium
Umpires:
Roel van Eert (NED)
Simon Taylor (NZL)

7 June 2014
13:00

| Spain | 2–5 | Belgium |
|---|---|---|
| Tubau 58'; Freixa 66' | Report | Cosyns 13', 38' de Saedeleer 16'; Stockbroekx 34'; Dohmen 47' |

Kyocera Stadion
Umpires:
Christian Blasch (GER)
Germán Montes de Oca (ARG)

7 June 2014
14:30

| India | 3–2 | Malaysia |
|---|---|---|
| Jasjit 14'; Akashdeep 49', 51' | Report | Razie 46'; Marhan 61' |

GreenFields Stadium
Umpires:
Roderick Wijsmuller (NED)
Simon Taylor (NZL)

7 June 2014
16:00

| England | 0–5 | Australia |
|---|---|---|
| | Report | Gohdes 1' de Young 13'; Dwyer 29'; Govers 35'; Zalewski 38' |

Kyocera Stadion
Umpires:
Gary Simmond0s (RSA)
Roel van Eert (NED)

9 June 2014
13:00

| Australia | 4–0 | India |
|---|---|---|
| Govers 3'; Ciriello 16', 22'; Hayward 20' | Report |

Kyocera Stadion
Umpires:
John Wright (RSA)
Roderick Wijsmuller (NED)

9 June 2014
14:30

| Spain | 5–2 | Malaysia |
|---|---|---|
| Dabanch 13', 46'; Salles 33'; Freixa 37'; Enrique 69' | Report | Ahmad 24'; Fitri 51' |

GreenFields Stadium
Umpires:
Adam Kearns (AUS)
Kim Hong-lae (KOR)

9 June 2014
19:45

| Belgium | 2–3 | England |
|---|---|---|
| Briels 13'; Cosyns 63' | Report | Catlin 19'; Jackson 39'; Lewers 66' |

Kyocera Stadion
Umpires:
Christian Blasch (GER)
Simon Taylor (NZL)

=== Pool B ===
| Pos | Team | Pld | W | D | L | GF | GA | GD | Pts | Qualification |
|---|---|---|---|---|---|---|---|---|---|---|
| 1 | Netherlands (H) | 5 | 4 | 1 | 0 | 14 | 4 | +10 | 13 | Semi-finals |
| 2 | Argentina | 5 | 4 | 0 | 1 | 15 | 5 | +10 | 12 | Semi-finals |
| 3 | Germany | 5 | 3 | 0 | 2 | 15 | 6 | +9 | 9 | Fifth place game |
| 4 | New Zealand | 5 | 2 | 1 | 2 | 12 | 10 | +2 | 7 | Seventh place game |
| 5 | South Korea | 5 | 0 | 1 | 4 | 3 | 15 | −12 | 1 | Ninth place game |
| 6 | South Africa | 5 | 0 | 1 | 4 | 2 | 21 | −19 | 1 | Eleventh place game |

Source: FIH
Rules for classification: 1) points; 2) goal difference; 3) goals scored; 4) head-to-head result.
(H) Hosts

1 June 2014
10:30

| Germany | 4–0 | South Africa |
|---|---|---|
| Zeller 27'; Stralkowski 35'; Grambusch 56'; Korn 59' | Report |

Kyocera Stadion
Umpires:
Tim Pullman (AUS)
Raghu Prasad (IND)

1 June 2014
16:00

| Netherlands | 3–1 | Argentina |
|---|---|---|
| Verga 26' van der Weerden 40'; Hofman 50' | Report | Peillat 33' |

Kyocera Stadion
Umpires:
Hamish Jamson (ENG)
Adam Kearns (AUS)

1 June 2014
17:30

| New Zealand | 2–1 | South Korea |
|---|---|---|
| Edwards 1'; Burrows 69' | Report | Kim Seong-kyu 64' |

GreenFields Stadium
Umpires:
Javed Shaikh (IND)
Paco Vázquez (ESP)

3 June 2014
14:30

| South Africa | 0–5 | New Zealand |
|---|---|---|
| | Report | S. Child 4'; Hayward 15', 17', 54'; McAleese 52' |

GreenFields Stadium
Umpires:
Nathan Stagno (GIB)
Paco Vázquez (ESP)

3 June 2014
16:00

| Germany | 0–1 | Argentina |
|---|---|---|
| | Report | Brunet 31' |

Kyocera Stadion
Umpires:
Hamish Jamson (ENG)
Tim Pullman (AUS)

3 June 2014
19:45

| Netherlands | 2–1 | South Korea |
|---|---|---|
| Hertzberger 21'; Kemperman 69' | Report | Nam Hyun-woo 5' |

Kyocera Stadion
Umpires:
Martin Madden (SCO)
Raghu Prasad (IND)

6 June 2014
13:00

| New Zealand | 1–3 | Argentina |
|---|---|---|
| Jenness 49' | Report | Peillat 44', 51', 63' |

Kyocera Stadion
Umpires:
Martin Madden (SCO)
Marcin Grochal (POL)

6 June 2014
17:30

| South Korea | 0–0 | South Africa |
|---|---|---|
| | Report |

GreenFields Stadium
Umpires:
Javed Shaikh (IND)
Adam Kearns (AUS)

6 June 2014
19:45

| Germany | 0–1 | Netherlands |
|---|---|---|
| | Report | Hertzberger 19' |

Kyocera Stadion
Umpires:
Nathan Stagno (GIB)
John Wright (RSA)

8 June 2014
10:30

| New Zealand | 3–5 | Germany |
|---|---|---|
| Hayward 34', 67', 70' | Report | Fuchs 2'; Zwicker 31', 40'; Zeller 35'; Fürk 57' |

Kyocera Stadion
Umpires:
Marcin Grochal (POL)
Hamish Jamson (ENG)

8 June 2014
13:00

| South Korea | 0–5 | Argentina |
|---|---|---|
| | Report | Peillat 4', 7', 20'; L. Vila 12'; Schickendantz 54' |

Kyocera Stadion
Umpires:
Tim Pullman (AUS)
Martin Madden (SCO)

8 June 2014
19:45

| South Africa | 1–7 | Netherlands |
|---|---|---|
| Reid-Ross 62' | Report | van Ass 4'; Verga 10'; Hertzberger 23'; Kemperman 33', 38'; Bakker 41'; Baart 66' |

Kyocera Stadion
Umpires:
Paco Vázquez (ESP)
Javed Shaikh (IND)

10 June 2014
10:30

| Argentina | 5–1 | South Africa |
|---|---|---|
| Menini 20'; Peillat 25', 61'; L. Vila 49', 63' | Report | Panther 57' |

Kyocera Stadion
Umpires:
Marcin Grochal (POL)
Paco Vázquez (ESP)

10 June 2014
13:00

| Germany | 6–1 | South Korea |
|---|---|---|
| Wesley 19'; Fürk 22'; Zwicker 32'; Fuchs 60'; Korn 65'; Zeller 70' | Report | Nam Hyun-woo 51' |

Kyocera Stadion
Umpires:
Nathan Stagno (GIB)
Adam Kearns (AUS)

10 June 2014
19:45

| New Zealand | 1–1 | Netherlands |
|---|---|---|
| S. Child 63' | Report | Verga 8' |

Kyocera Stadion
Umpires:
Hamish Jamson (ENG)
Gary Simmonds (RSA)

== Fifth to twelfth place classification ==
=== Eleventh and twelfth place ===
12 June 2014
13:30

| Malaysia | 2–6 | South Africa |
|---|---|---|
| Firhan 26'; Shahrun 70' | Report | Reid-Ross 43', 45', 48'; Norris-Jones 50'; Smith 64' de Voux 69' |

Kyocera Stadion
Umpires:
Javed Shaikh (IND)
Roderick Wijsmuller (NED)

=== Ninth and tenth place ===
14 June 2014
08:30

| India | 3–0 | South Korea |
|---|---|---|
| Akashdeep 6', 50'; Rupinder 42' | Report |

Kyocera Stadion
Umpires:
Adam Kearns (AUS)
Roel van Eert (NED)

=== Seventh and eighth place ===
15 June 2014
08:00

| Spain | 1–1 | New Zealand |
|---|---|---|
| Lleonart 55' | Report | Russell 31' |
Penalties
| Freixa (penalty shoot-out scored); Alegre (penalty shoot-out missed); Oliva (penalty shoot-out missed) | 1–4 | (penalty shoot-out scored) Inglis; (penalty shoot-out scored) Hilton; (penalty shoot-out scored) Edwards; (penalty shoot-out scored) Child |

Kyocera Stadion
Umpires:
Tim Pullman (AUS)
Kim Hong-lae (KOR)

=== Fifth and sixth place ===
15 June 2014
10:15

| Belgium | 4–2 | Germany |
|---|---|---|
| Boon 25'; Cosyns 40' van Aubel 59'; Dockier 65' | Report | Zeller 18'; Fuchs 56' |

Kyocera Stadion
Umpires:
Germán Montes de Oca (ARG)
Paco Vázquez (ESP)

== First to fourth place classification ==
=== Bracket ===
Semi-finals
13 June
Australia | 5
Argentina | 1
13 June
Netherlands | 1
England | 0

Final
15 June
Australia | 6
Netherlands | 1
Third place
15 June
Argentina | 2
England | 0

=== Semi-finals ===
13 June 2014
15:15

| Netherlands | 1–0 | England |
|---|---|---|
| van der Weerden 31' | Report |

Kyocera Stadion
Umpires:
Christian Blasch (GER)
Simon Taylor (NZL)

13 June 2014
18:00

| Australia | 5–1 | Argentina |
|---|---|---|
| Govers 4'; Hayward 22', 55'; Whetton 33'; Ciriello 49' | Report | Peillat 58' |

Kyocera Stadion
Umpires:
Hamish Jamson (ENG)
Gary Simmonds (RSA)

=== Third and fourth place ===
15 June 2014
12:30

| Argentina | 2–0 | England |
|---|---|---|
| Paredes 55', 56' | Report |

Kyocera Stadion
Umpires:
Marcin Grochal (POL)
Martin Madden (SCO)

=== Final ===
15 June 2014
15:15

| Australia | 6–1 | Netherlands |
|---|---|---|
| Ciriello 20', 47', 53'; Govers 24'; Turner 37'; Dwyer 64' | Report | Hertzberger 14' |

Kyocera Stadion
Umpires:
John Wright (RSA)
Nathan Stagno (GIB)

== Statistics ==
=== Final standings ===
| Pos | Grp | Team | Pld | W | D | L | GF | GA | GD | Pts | Final standing |
|---|---|---|---|---|---|---|---|---|---|---|---|
| 1st place, gold medalist(s) | A | Australia | 7 | 7 | 0 | 0 | 30 | 3 | +27 | 21 | Gold medal |
| 2nd place, silver medalist(s) | B | Netherlands (H) | 7 | 5 | 1 | 1 | 16 | 10 | +6 | 16 | Silver medal |
| 3rd place, bronze medalist(s) | B | Argentina | 7 | 5 | 0 | 2 | 18 | 10 | +8 | 15 | Bronze medal |
| 4 | A | England | 7 | 3 | 1 | 3 | 8 | 12 | −4 | 10 | Fourth place |
| 5 | A | Belgium | 6 | 4 | 0 | 2 | 21 | 14 | +7 | 12 | Eliminated in group stage |
| 6 | B | Germany | 6 | 3 | 0 | 3 | 17 | 10 | +7 | 9 | Eliminated in group stage |
| 7 | B | New Zealand | 6 | 2 | 2 | 2 | 13 | 11 | +2 | 8 | Eliminated in group stage |
| 8 | A | Spain | 6 | 1 | 3 | 2 | 10 | 13 | −3 | 6 | Eliminated in group stage |
| 9 | A | India | 6 | 2 | 1 | 3 | 10 | 12 | −2 | 7 | Eliminated in group stage |
| 10 | B | South Korea | 6 | 0 | 1 | 5 | 3 | 18 | −15 | 1 | Eliminated in group stage |
| 11 | B | South Africa | 6 | 1 | 1 | 4 | 8 | 23 | −15 | 4 | Eliminated in group stage |
| 12 | A | Malaysia | 6 | 0 | 0 | 6 | 8 | 26 | −18 | 0 | Eliminated in group stage |

Source: FIH
(H) Hosts

=== Awards ===
| Top Goalscorer | Player of the Tournament | Goal of the Tournament | Goalkeeper of the Tournament | Young Player of the Tournament |
|---|---|---|---|---|
| (Argentina) Gonzalo Peillat | (Australia) Mark Knowles | (Belgium) Sébastien Dockier | (Netherlands) Jaap Stockmann | (Australia) Jeremy Hayward |

=== Goalscorers ===
There were 162 goals scored in 38 matches, for an average of 4.26 goals per match.

10 goals

- (Argentina) Gonzalo Peillat

7 goals

- (Australia) Chris Ciriello

6 goals

- (New Zealand) Andy Hayward

5 goals

- (Australia) Kieran Govers
- (Belgium) Tom Boon
- (Belgium) Tanguy Cosyns
- (India) Akashdeep Singh

4 goals

- (Germany) Christopher Zeller
- (Netherlands) Jeroen Hertzberger
- (South Africa) Justin Reid-Ross

3 goals

- (Argentina) Lucas Vila
- (Australia) Jamie Dwyer
- (Australia) Jeremy Hayward
- (Australia) Glenn Turner
- (Belgium) John-John Dohmen
- (Germany) Florian Fuchs
- (Germany) Martin Zwicker
- (Malaysia) Razie Rahim
- (Netherlands) Robbert Kempermann
- (Netherlands) Valentin Verga

2 goals

- (Argentina) Matias Paredes
- (Australia) Eddie Ockenden
- (Australia) Jake Whetton
- (Belgium) Sébastien Dockier
- (Belgium) Florent van Aubel
- (England) Mark Gleghorne
- (England) Ashley Jackson
- (Germany) Benedikt Fürk
- (Germany) Oliver Korn
- (India) Rupinder Pal Singh
- (Netherlands) Mink van der Weerden
- (New Zealand) Simon Child
- (South Korea) Nam Hyun-woo
- (Spain) Gabriel Dabanch
- (Spain) Santi Freixa
- (Spain) Eduard Tubau

1 goal

- (Argentina) Manuel Brunet
- (Argentina) Joaquín Menini
- (Argentina) Guillermo Schickendantz
- (Australia) Liam de Young
- (Australia) Tim Deavin
- (Australia) Matt Gohdes
- (Australia) Mark Knowles
- (Australia) Aran Zalewski
- (Belgium) Thomas Briels
- (Belgium) Alexandre de Saedeleer
- (Belgium) Simon Gougnard
- (Belgium) Emmanuel Stockbroekx
- (England) Alastair Brogdon
- (England) Nicholas Catlin
- (England) Iain Lewers
- (England) Simon Mantell
- (Germany) Mats Grambusch
- (Germany) Thilo Stralkowski
- (Germany) Christopher Wesley
- (India) Jasjit Singh Kular
- (India) Dharamvir Singh
- (India) Mandeep Singh
- (Malaysia) Shahrun Abdullah
- (Malaysia) Firhan Ashaari
- (Malaysia) Marhan Jalil
- (Malaysia) Fitri Saari
- (Malaysia) Tengku Tajuddin
- (Netherlands) Seve van Ass
- (Netherlands) Sander Baart
- (Netherlands) Billy Bakker
- (Netherlands) Rogier Hofman
- (New Zealand) Phil Burrows
- (New Zealand) Steve Edwards
- (New Zealand) Stephen Jenness
- (New Zealand) Shea McAleese
- (New Zealand) Kane Russell
- (South Africa) Jean-Pierre de Voux
- (South Africa) Lloyd Norris-Jones
- (South Africa) Clinton Panther
- (South Africa) Austin Smith
- (South Korea) Kim Seong-kyu
- (Spain) Sergi Enrique
- (Spain) Xavi Lleonart
- (Spain) Roc Oliva
- (Spain) Marc Salles

Source: FIH
