= Fiji Hockey Federation =

Governing body of field hockey in Fiji

- Sport: Field Hockey
- Jurisdiction: Fiji
- Abbreviation: FHF
- Affiliation: FIH
- Regional affiliation: OHF
- President: Emi NawaQetaki
- Chairman: Jone Tuiipelehaki
- (Fiji)

The Fiji Hockey Federation (FHF) is the governing body of field hockey in Fiji, Oceania. Its headquarters are in Suva, Fiji. It is affiliated to the International Hockey Federation (IHF) and the Oceania Hockey Federation (OCF).

Emi NawaQetaki is the president of Hockey Association of Fiji and Jone Tuiipelehaki is the general secretary.

== History ==
Field hockey has a long history in Fiji, with the sport introduced as early as 1916. The early competitions featured teams with notable figures like the Fijian chief and statesman Ratu Sir Lala Sukuna. For many years, the development of hockey was strongly influenced by ties with New Zealand, with Fiji's national teams making early international tours, including the men's team in 1939 and the women's team in 1936. The FHF is responsible for maintaining the sport's structure and supporting its growth at the grassroots level, including through the introduction of modified formats like Minkey (mini hockey) in the 1980s.

=== 2016 ===
Round 1 of 2016 Men Hockey World League Round and 2016 Women Hockey World League Round was held in Suva, Fiji from 27 June to 2 July 2016. Fiji took the top spot in men's as well as women's category. Dutta Leevan scored the maximum (23) goals in men's category and Dutta Tiara took the honors in the women's (27).

== Governance and Structure ==
The FHF operates under its constitution and is a member of the Fiji Association of Sports and National Olympic Committee (FASANOC). The FHF oversees the activities of several affiliated District associations, which organise local league competitions, including: Suva Hockey Association, Lautoka Hockey Association, Nadi Hockey Association

These districts host various local clubs, such as Ventures Hockey Club, Marist Hockey Club, and Stingers Hockey Club, which field both men's and women's teams. The FHF has also been actively engaged in updating its governance structure and developing a strategic plan for the sport's future growth.

== Notable Achievements ==
Fiji made a historic breakthrough in the shorter, five-a-side format of the game, Hockey5s.

- 2023 Oceania Cup: Both the Fiji men's and women's teams secured bronze medals at the inaugural Hockey5s Oceania Cup, which served as a qualifying tournament.
- 2024 FIH Hockey5s World Cup: This performance qualified both teams for the first-ever FIH Hockey5s World Cup, held in Muscat, Oman, in January 2024. This marked Fiji's first appearance in any Hockey World Cup across all formats.
  - The women's team finished in a commendable 12th place globally

The success of the Hockey5s teams has been a significant boost for the sport's visibility and development pathways in Fiji, attracting media attention and corporate sponsorship.

== Facilities ==
The primary high-performance venue for the sport is the National Hockey Centre in Suva, which features an FIH-certified hockey turf. The maintenance and optimal use of this facility are critical components of the FHF's development efforts.

== See also ==
- Fiji men's national field hockey team
- Oceania Hockey Federation
