= Jacob Whetton =

Australian field hockey player

Jake Whetton
Personal information
- Full name: Jacob Thomas Whetton
- Born: 15 June 1991 (age 35) Brisbane, Australia
- Height: 1.72 m (5 ft 8 in)
- Weight: 64 kg (141 lb)

Sport
- Sport: Field hockey
- Position: Forward
- Club: Brisbane Blaze
Youth career
- Team
- –: Eastern Suburbs Tigers
Senior career
Years	Team	Caps	Goals
–2018	Queensland Blades	-	-
2014–2017	Punjab Warriors	-	-
2019-2024	Brisbane Blaze	-	-
2024-present	NMHC Nijmegen	-	-
National team
Years	Team	Caps	Goals
2011–present	Australia	280	(70)
Medal record
Men's field hockey
Representing Australia
Olympic Games
Silver medal – second place	2020 Tokyo	Team
World Cup
Gold medal – first place	2014 The Hague
Bronze medal – third place	2018 Bhubaneswar
Oceania Cup
Gold medal – first place	2013 Stratford
Gold medal – first place	2017 Sydney
Gold medal – first place	2019 Rockhampton
Gold medal – first place	2023 Whangārei
FIH Pro League
Gold medal – first place	2019 Amstelveen
Commonwealth Games
Gold medal – first place	2014 Glasgow	Team
Gold medal – first place	2018 Gold Coast	Team
Gold medal – first place	2022 Birmingham	Team
Champions Trophy
Gold medal – first place	2012 Melbourne
Gold medal – first place	2018 Breda
Bronze medal – third place	2014 Bhubaneswar
World League
Gold medal – first place	2016–17 Bhubaneswar
Junior World Cup
Bronze medal – third place	2009 Johor Bahru–Singapore

Jacob Thomas Whetton (born 15 June 1991) is an Australian field hockey player who plays as a forward for the Australian national team.

== Personal life ==
Whetton is from Queensland and considers Brisbane his home town. He was born on 15 June 1991. He lives in Perth, Western Australia. His nickname is Whetty.

== Club career ==
Whetton plays for the Queensland Blades in the Australian Hockey League where he wears number 21. He played three seasons for the Punjab Warriors in the Hockey India League. In the inaugural Hockey One season in 2019 he played for the Brisbane Blaze. In February 2020 he signed a two-year contract at Oranje-Rood in the Dutch Hoofdklasse from the 2020–21 season onwards. After the postponement of the 2020 Summer Olympics to 2021 the transfer was cancelled.

== International career ==
In December 2011, Whetton was named as one of fourteen players to be on the 2012 Summer Olympics Australian men's national Olympic development squad. While this squad is not in the top twenty-eight and separate from the Olympic training coach, the Australian coach Ric Charlesworth did not rule out selecting from only the training squad, with players from the Olympic development having a chance at possibly being called up to represent Australia at the Olympics. He trained with the team from 18 January to mid-March in Perth, Western Australia. Since his debut in 2011 he has played 209 times for the Kookaburras.

Whetton was selected in the Kookaburras Olympics squad for the Tokyo 2020 Olympics. The team reached the final for the first time since 2004 but couldn't achieve gold, beaten by Belgium in a shootout.
