= 2019 Men's Oceania Cup =

Hockey competition

2019 Oceania Cup
Tournament details
- Host country: Australia
- City: Rockhampton
- Dates: 5–8 September
- Venue: Kalka Shades Hockey Fields

Final positions
- Champions: Australia (11th title)
- Runner-up: New Zealand

Tournament statistics
- Matches played: 3
- Goals scored: 11 (3.67 per match)
- Top scorer: (Australia) Blake Govers (4 goals)

The 2019 Men's Oceania Cup was the eleventh edition of the men's field hockey tournament. It was held from 5 to 8 September in Rockhampton.

The tournament served as a qualifier for the 2020 Summer Olympics.

Australia won the tournament for the eleventh time, finishing ahead of New Zealand at the conclusion of the pool stage.

== Background ==
Australia were the ten-time back-to-back defending champions. The winners of the Cup earned an automatic place at the 2020 Olympic Games.

The hosting announcement of the Rockhampton Hockey Association came as $5 million was being invested into the hockey centre to upgrade the facilities. In March 2019, Stirling Hinchliffe, MLA for Sandgate and Minister for Local Government, Racing and Multicultural Affairs announced that the Government of Queensland had invested $2.5 million into the Kalka Shades, the home of the Rockhampton Hockey Association.

== Teams ==
Australia

Head Coach: Colin Batch

2. Tom Craig
3. Corey Weyer
4. Jake Harvie
5. Tom Wickham
6. Matthew Dawson
9. Jacob Anderson
11. Eddie Ockenden (C)
12. Jacob Whetton
13. Blake Govers
16. Tim Howard
17. Aran Zalewski (C)
20. Matthew Swann
22. Flynn Ogilvie
23. Daniel Beale
24. Tyler Lovell (C)
29. Timothy Brand
30. Andrew Charter (GK)
32. Jeremy Hayward
New Zealand

Head Coach: Darren Smith

2. Cory Bennett
4. Dane Lett
7. Nick Ross
8. Richard Joyce (GK)
11. Jacob Smith
12. Sam Lane
13. Marcus Child
14. Jared Panchia
15. George Enersen (GK)
17. Nic Woods
21. Kane Russell
22. Blair Tarrant (C)
24. Arun Panchia
25. Shea McAleese
27. Stephen Jenness
29. Hugo Inglis
30. George Muir
31. Hayden Phillips

== Results ==
All times are local (AEST).

=== Pool ===
Pos	Team	Pld	W	D	L	GF	GA	GD	Pts	Qualification
1	Australia (H)	3	2	1	0	9	2	+7	7	2020 Summer Olympics
2	New Zealand	3	0	1	2	2	9	−7	1	

Source: FIH
Rules for classification: 1) points; 2) goal difference; 3) goals scored; 4) head-to-head result.
(H) Hosts

=== Fixtures ===
5 September 2019
16:00

Australia	4–0	New Zealand
Craig 5'; Brand 12'; Govers 36'; Ogilvie 40'	Report

Umpires:
Rawi Anbananthan (MAS)
Lim Hong Zhen (SGP)

7 September 2019
18:00

Australia	2–2	New Zealand
Govers 20'; Wickham 24'	Report	Smith 32'; Russell 41'

Umpires:
Lim Hong Zhen (SGP)
Rawi Anbananthan (MAS)

8 September 2019
18:15

Australia	3–0	New Zealand
Brand 11'; Govers 14', 58'	Report

Umpires:
Rawi Anbananthan (MAS)
Lim Hong Zhen (SGP)

== Statistics ==
=== Final standings ===
1. Australia
2. New Zealand

=== Goalscorers ===
There were 11 goals scored in 3 matches, for an average of 3.67 goals per match.

4 goals

- (Australia) Blake Govers

2 goals

- (Australia) Timothy Brand

1 goal

- (Australia) Thomas Craig
- (Australia) Flynn Ogilvie
- (Australia) Thomas Wickham
- (New Zealand) Kane Russell
- (New Zealand) Jacob Smith
