= Papua New Guinea Hockey Federation =

Governing body of field hockey in Papua New Guinea

The Papua New Guinea Hockey Federation is the governing body of field hockey in Papua New Guinea, Oceania. Its headquarters are in Boroko, NCD, Port Moresby. It is affiliated to IHF International Hockey Federation and OCF Oceania Hockey Federation.

Kaluwin Potuan is the President of Hockey Association of PNG and Thomas Kahai is the General Secretary.

== History ==
Papua New Guinea at the 2015 Pacific Games#Field hockey

=== 2016 ===
PNG hosted the World League Qualifier for the Hockey World Cup in its capital city of Port Moresby in July 2016.

=== 2017 ===
PNG Hockey Federation announced its men’s and women’s squads for the Oceania Cup championships in Sydney, Australia, in October-2017.

== See also ==
- Oceania Hockey Federation
