= Field hockey at the Pacific Games =

Sport introduced to the Games in 1979

Field hockey was introduced at the Pacific Games (formerly South Pacific Games) at the sixth edition in 1979 for men. The women's tournament was first contested at the twelfth edition in 2003. From the 2015 Games, the Hockey 5s format, a 5-a-side tournament played on a smaller-sized field, has been used.

Field hockey is currently an optional sport on the Pacific Games programme.

== Men's tournament ==
=== Summaries ===
Year	Host	Event	Gold Medal match			Bronze Medal match			Ref
Year	Host	Event	Champions	Score	Runners-up	3rd place	Score	4th place	Ref
1979; Details	Suva, Fiji	Field hockey	Fiji	2–1	Papua New Guinea	Western Samoa	3–1	Solomon Islands	
2015; Details	Port Moresby, Papua New Guinea	Hockey5s	Fiji	15–1	Vanuatu	Papua New Guinea	17–1	Solomon Islands	
2023; Details	Honiara, Solomon Islands	Hockey5s	Fiji	0–0 (3–2) (penalties)	Papua New Guinea	Vanuatu	2–1	Solomon Islands	

=== Team appearances ===
Team	1979	2015	2023
Fiji	1st	1st	1st
Papua New Guinea	2nd	3rd	2nd
Samoa	3rd	–	6th
Solomon Islands	4th	4th	4th
Tonga	–	5th	5th
Vanuatu	–	2nd	3rd

== Women's tournament ==
=== Summaries ===
Year	Host	Event	Gold Medal match			Bronze Medal match			Ref
Year	Host	Event	Champions	Score	Runners-up	3rd place	Score	4th place	Ref
2003; Details	Suva, Fiji	Field hockey	Fiji	3–1	Papua New Guinea	Samoa	3–0	Tonga	
2007; Details	Apia, Samoa	Field hockey	Fiji	3–2 (a.e.t)	Papua New Guinea	Samoa	2–2 (3–2) (penalties)	Tonga	
2015; Details	Port Moresby, Papua New Guinea	Hockey5s	Fiji	9–4	Papua New Guinea	Vanuatu	6–2	Tonga	
2023; Details	Honiara, Solomon Islands	Hockey5s	Fiji	2–0	Solomon Islands	Papua New Guinea	2–0	Tonga	

=== Team appearances ===
Team	2003	2007	2015	2023
American Samoa	5th	–	–	–
Fiji	1st	1st	1st	1st
Papua New Guinea	2nd	2nd	2nd	3rd
Samoa	3rd	3rd	–	6th
Solomon Islands	–	–	–	2nd
Tonga	4th	4th	4th	4th
Vanuatu	–	–	3rd	5th

== Medal table ==
Rank	PGA	Gold	Silver	Bronze	Total
1	Fiji	7	0	0	7
2	Papua New Guinea	0	5	2	7
3	Vanuatu	0	1	2	3
4	Solomon Islands	0	1	0	1
5	Samoa	0	0	3	3
Totals (5 entries)		7	7	7	21

== See also ==
- Oceania Cup
