= Aran Zalewski =

Australian field hockey player

Personal information
- Born: 21 March 1991 (age 35) Margaret River, Western Australia, Australia
- Height: 1.86 m (6 ft 1 in)
- Weight: 80 kg (176 lb)

Sport
- Sport: Field hockey
- Position: Midfielder
National team
Years	Team	Caps	Goals
2011–present	Australia	193	(25)
Medal record
Men's field hockey
Representing Australia
Olympic Games
Silver medal – second place	2020 Tokyo	Team
World Cup
Gold medal – first place	2014 The Hague
Bronze medal – third place	2018 Bhubaneswar
Oceania Cup
Gold medal – first place	2013 Stratford
Gold medal – first place	2015 Stratford
Gold medal – first place	2017 Sydney
Gold medal – first place	2019 Rockhampton
Gold medal – first place	2023 Whangārei
FIH Pro League
Gold medal – first place	2019 Amstelveen
Champions Trophy
Gold medal – first place	2016 London
Gold medal – first place	2018 Breda
World League
Gold medal – first place	2014–15 Raipur
Gold medal – first place	2016–17 Bhubaneswar
Commonwealth Games
Gold medal – first place	2014 Glasgow	Team
Gold medal – first place	2018 Gold Coast	Team
Gold medal – first place	2022 Birmingham	Team

Aran Zalewski (born 21 March 1991) is an Australian field hockey player who is the captain of the Australian national team.

== Personal ==
He is from Margaret River, Western Australia. he attended Aquinas College in Perth, Western Australia. As a 12- and 13-year-old, he played in the Margaret River South West League.

== Field hockey ==
He is a centre-half. He played junior hockey in Margaret River. As a 12- and 13-year-old, he played in the Margaret River South West League.

He made his state team debut when he was 15 years old.

=== National team ===
He participated in a training camp for the first time in October 2011. He had his first call up to the national team in October 2011 in a game against India at the Bunbury Hockey Stadium. He scored a goal in his debut in the 57th minute, a game Australia won 5–0.

In December 2011, he was named as one of fourteen players to be on the 2012 Summer Olympics Australian men's national Olympic development squad. While this squad is not in the top twenty-eight and separate from the Olympic training coach, the Australian coach Ric Charlesworth did not rule out selecting from only the training squad, with players from the Olympic development having a chance at possibly being called up to represent Australia at the Olympics. He trained with the team from 18 January to mid-March in Perth, Western Australia. He was named the best player of the 2019 FIH Pro League after Australia won the first edition of the FIH Pro League. In December 2019, he was nominated for the FIH Player of the Year Award.

Zalewski was selected in the Kookaburras Olympics squad for the Tokyo 2020 Olympics. The team reached the final for the first time since 2004 but couldn't achieve gold, beaten by Belgium in a shootout.
