= Hugo Inglis =

New Zealand field hockey player

Personal information
- Born: Hugo Reid Inglis; 18 January 1991 (age 35) Dunedin, New Zealand
- Height: 1.78 m (5 ft 10 in)
- Weight: 74 kg (163 lb)

Sport
- Sport: Field hockey
- Position: Forward
- Club: Southern Alpiners
Youth career
- Team
- –: Southern Dogs
Senior career
Years	Team	Caps	Goals
–2011	Southern Dogs	-	-
2012–2013	SCHC	-	-
2013	Southern Dogs	-	-
2014	Uttar Pradesh Wizards	-	-
2014–2015	Rotterdam	-	-
2015	Southern Dogs	-	-
2016–2019	Braxgata	-	-
2019–2020	Rotterdam	-	-
National team
Years	Team	Caps	Goals
2009–present	New Zealand	237	(66)
Medal record
Men's field hockey
Representing New Zealand
Commonwealth Games
Silver medal – second place	2018 Gold Coast	Team
Bronze medal – third place	2010 Delhi	Team
Oceania Cup
Silver medal – second place	2013 Stratford
Silver medal – second place	2015 Stratford
Silver medal – second place	2019 Rockhampton
Silver medal – second place	2023 Whangārei
Hockey World League
Silver medal – second place	2012–13 New Delhi	Team

Hugo Reid Inglis (born 18 January 1991) is a New Zealand field hockey player who plays as a forward for the New Zealand national team.

He played for the Southern Dogs in the New Zealand Hockey League and he played in Europe for SCHC, Braxgata and currently Rotterdam. He also represented the Uttar Pradesh Wizards in the Hockey India League.

== Club career ==
Inglis started playing hockey when he was five and he joined his local hockey club the Southern Dogs. He attended high school at John McGlashan College then Otago Boys' High School. At Otago Boys' he was a part of a team that reached the Rankin Cup (New Zealand secondary school boys' championship) final. In 2012 he signed a two-year contract at SCHC in the Netherlands. Due to his commitments to the national team, he would miss the preparation for the second half of the season so in January 2013 his contract at SCHC was annulled and he returned to New Zealand. In 2014 he joined Rotterdam where he played for one season. He returned to Europe in 2016 to play for Braxgata in Belgium. After three seasons with Braxgata, he returned to Rotterdam.

== International career ==
Inglis made his international team debut in 2009. At the 2012 Summer Olympics, he competed for the national team in the men's tournament. At the 2014 Commonwealth Games, he was one of the New Zealand players who scored in the penalty shoot-out to decide the bronze medal, but New Zealand still lost the match to England. He is one of three players from Dunedin to attend the 2016 Summer Olympics in Rio de Janeiro, where the men's team came seventh. In 2018, Inglis was part of the New Zealand team who won silver at the Commonwealth Games.
