= Fiji men's national field hockey team =

Fiji
- Association: OHF (Oceania)
- Confederation: Fiji Hockey Federation
- Head Coach: Louis Cockburn

FIH ranking
- Current: 70 ▼12 (9 March 2026)
- Highest: 44 (January 2017 – July 2017)
- Lowest: 73 (2008)

Oceania Cup
- Appearances: 2 (first in 2005)
- Best result: (bronze) 3rd (2005, 2015)
Medal record
Oceania Cup
Bronze medal – third place	2005 Suva
Bronze medal – third place	2015 Stratford

The Fiji men's national field hockey team represents Fiji in international field hockey competitions and is controlled by the Fiji Hockey Federation.

== Results ==
=== Oceania Cup ===
- 2005 – (bronze)
- 2015 – (bronze)

=== Hockey World League ===
Hockey World League record
Season	Position	Round	Pld	W	D *	L	GF	GA
2012–13	32nd of 33	Round 1	2	2	0	0	24	2
2012–13	32nd of 33	Round 2	5	0	0	5	8	48
2014–15	Unranked	Round 1	2	2	0	0	21	3
2014–15	Unranked	Round 2	Withdrew					
2016–17	36th of 36	Round 1	8	7	1	0	66	13
2016–17	36th of 36	Round 2	6	0	0	6	7	56
Total	32nd (1x)	Round 2 (2x)	23	11	1	11	126	122

*Draws include knockout matches decided on a penalty shoot-out.

=== Pacific Games ===
- 1979 - (gold)
- 2015 - (gold)

== See also ==
- Fiji women's national field hockey team
