= Simon Child =

New Zealand field hockey player

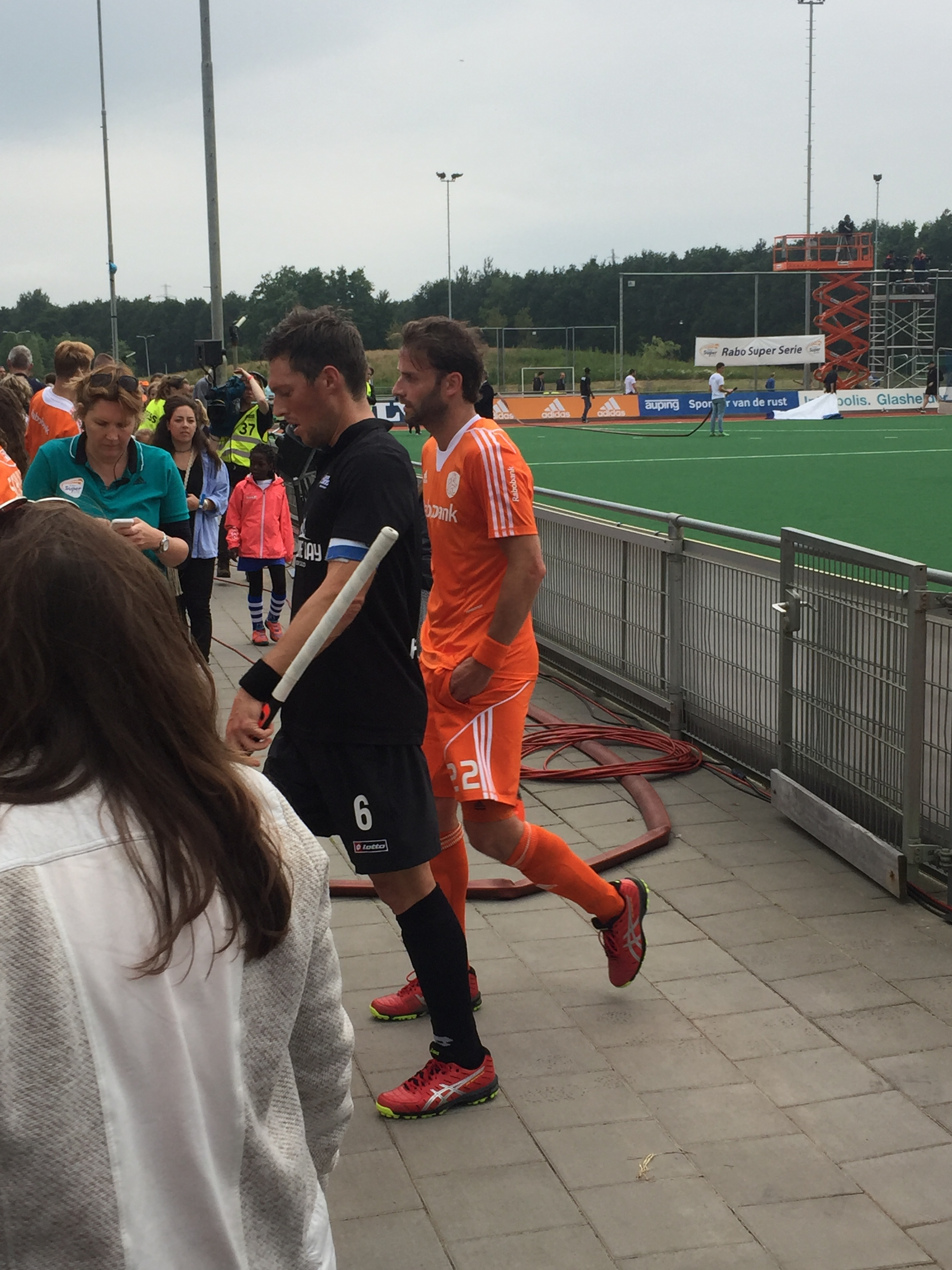
- Interland of the Netherlands against New Zealand on 22 June 2016 in Assen

Personal information
- Full name: Simon James Law Child
- Born: 16 April 1988 (age 38) Auckland, New Zealand
- Height: 186 cm (6 ft 1 in)
- Weight: 82 kg (181 lb)

Sport
- Sport: Field hockey
- Position: Forward
National team
Years	Team	Caps	Goals
2005–	New Zealand	274	(140)
Medal record
Men's field hockey
Representing New Zealand
Commonwealth Games
Bronze medal – third place	2010 New Delhi	Team
FIH World League
Silver medal – second place	2013–13 New Delhi	Team
Oceania Cup
Silver medal – second place	2013 Stratford
Silver medal – second place	2015 Stratford
Silver medal – second place	2023 Whangārei

Simon James Law Child (born 16 April 1988) is a New Zealand field hockey player, who earned his first cap for the national team, The Black Sticks, in 2005 against Malaysia.

== Personal life ==
Simon Child was born and raised in Auckland, New Zealand. He has a younger brother, Marcus, who also plays representative hockey for New Zealand.

== Career ==
=== Club Hockey ===
At club level, Child plays hockey for his home city of Auckland in the New Zealand National Hockey League.

In 2015, he relocated to India to represent the Delhi Waveriders in the Hockey India League.

=== National team ===
Following his debut in 2005, Child was a regular inclusion for the Black Sticks for over ten years.

His first major international tournament was the 2006 World Cup in Mönchengladbach, Germany. He followed this up with appearances at the 2008, 2012 and 2016 Summer Olympics. From 2014 to 2016, Child was captain of the national team.

He also played in three editions of the Commonwealth Games, in 2006, 2010 and 2014. In the bronze medal playoff against England at the 2014 tournament, Child scored twice but was one of the New Zealand players who missed in the penalty shoot-out after the game finished as a 3–3 draw. He played club hockey in the Netherlands for HC Rotterdam.

Following the 2016 Olympics, Child suffered a number of injuries forcing him out of competition for almost three years. In August 2019, he was named to make his return during the Ready Steady Tokyo Olympic Test event in Tokyo, Japan.

Child competed at the 2024 Summer Olympics.

==== International tournaments ====
- World Cup – 2006, 2014
- Commonwealth Games – 2006, 2010, 2014
- Sultan Azlan Shah Cup – 2006, 2018, 2009, 2011, 2012, 2015, 2016
- Champions Challenge I – 2007, 2009, 2014
- Olympic Games – 2008, 2012, 2016
- Champions Trophy – 2008, 2010, 2011, 2012
- FIH World League – 2012–13, 2014–15
