= Jan Peterson =

Scottish-Canadian writer, historian, artist and journalist

- Born: Janet Anderson Craig Peterson; May 3, 1937 (age 89); Strathaven, Scotland, United Kingdom
- Education: Kingston Business College
- Occupations: Non-fiction writer; historian; artist; journalist
- Years active: 1970s–present
- Spouse: Ray Peterson
- Children: 3

Janet Anderson Craig Peterson (born May 3, 1937, in Strathaven, Scotland) is a Scottish-Canadian non-fiction writer, historian, artist, and journalist. She has written books about Vancouver Island, including those about the cities of Nanaimo and Port Alberni. Peterson has been featured in the Times Colonist and Tofino-Ucluelet Westerly News.

== Early life ==
Peterson spent her early years on a farm in Scotland. She attended Strathaven Academy. She and her family immigrated to Kingston, Ontario, Canada in 1957, when she was 20. She attended Kingston Business College before taking a secretarial position at Queen's University. In 1963, she married Ray Peterson, and in 1965 the Petersons moved together across Canada to Vancouver, British Columbia. In 1972, the Peterson family—then with three children: Karen, John, and Craig—moved to Port Alberni on Vancouver Island.

== Career ==
After moving to the Alberni Valley, Peterson got involved in the local arts and culture scene. She exhibited her own paintings throughout the 1970ș and served as president of the Alberni Valley Community Arts Council. In 1977, Peterson oversaw the transformation of a heritage home into the Rollin Art Centre, a fine arts gallery, gift shop, classroom, and office dedicated to enriching the cultural environment of the Alberni Valley.

She served on the BC Arts Board from 1979–1981, and continued to participate in art shows and various exhibitions in the Alberni Valley, Nanaimo, and Victoria. During this time, Peterson was also writing about the arts. She produced press releases about local art events and published the Alberni Valley Community Arts Council's newsletters.

From 1981 to 1987, Peterson worked as a reporter for the Alberni Valley Times. While working at the newspaper, she won a Jack Wasserman Memorial Award for outstanding journalism. In 1987, a health issue pulled Peterson away from her work for a two-year period. It was during this time that she was inspired to begin researching and writing about the history of Vancouver Island.

In 1996, she retired to Nanaimo, continuing her research into the history of Vancouver Island. She completed a historical trilogy about her new home city, publishing Black Diamond City: Nanaimo in the Victorian Era (2002), Hub City: Nanaimo, 1886–1920 (2003), and Harbour City: Nanaimo in Transition, 1920–1967 (2006). The three books chart the city's foundation, growth, development, and citizens.

In 2004, Peterson self-published her first book about Scotland, Listen Tae Yer Granny. Primarily a collection of Scottish rhymes, proverbs, and folklore, the book also includes stories from her own family's history.

In 2008, Peterson worked with the Nanaimo Museum to publish A Place in Time: The Nanaimo Chronicles. She donated the book's proceeds to the museum.

Peterson's next book, Kilts on the Coast: The Scots Who Built BC, published in 2012, profiles Scottish settlers, including James Douglas, William Fraser Tolmie, and Robert Dunsmuir, who came to Vancouver Island in 1848–1854 primarily to work in the Hudson's Bay Company's fur trade and coal mining ventures.

Peterson returned to the Alberni Valley to write her 10th non-fiction book, Port Alberni: More Than Just a Mill Town, which was released in 2014.

In 2017, Peterson published Mark Bate: Nanaimo's First Mayor, her first historical biography. The book closely follows the life of Mark Bate, covering not only his years acting as the manager of Nanaimo's first coal mine but also his sixteen terms as city mayor. The book includes many excerpts from Bate's journals and letters, and it offers insight into the drama that arose among him and other prominent coal-men-turned-politicians (including the future premier of British Columbia, Robert Dunsmuir).

Peterson has worked with many community organizations that promote arts, culture, education, and history. These include the Nanaimo Historical Society, the Nanaimo District Museum Society, the Nanaimo Community Archives Society, the Friends of North Island College, the Alberni District Historical Society, the Alberni Valley Community Arts Council, the Alberni Valley Chamber of Commerce, and the Alberni Valley Museum Advisory Board. She holds honorary lifetime memberships in both the Alberni District Historical Society and the Alberni Valley Community Arts Council.

She has repeatedly been recognized for her community service and her contributions to the historical record of Vancouver Island, including 1997 and 1999 Certificates of Honor from the British Columbia Historical Federation; a Canada 125 medal for community service; a certificate of appreciation from the City of Port Alberni for historical research; and a Heritage Award from the Alberni Valley Museum & Heritage Commission. In 2018, the City of Nanaimo awarded her the inaugural Honor in Heritage Award, recognizing her outstanding support, advocacy, promotion, and interpretation of Nanaimo's heritage and history.

== Books ==
- The Alberinis: 1860–1922 (1992)
- Twin Cities: Alberni-Port Alberni (1994)
- Cathedral Grove: MacMillan Park (1996)
- Journeys Down the Alberni Canal to Barkley Sound (1999)
- Black Diamond City: Nanaimo – The Victorian Era (2002)
- Hub City: Nanaimo, 1886–1920 (2003)
- Listen Tae Yer Granny (2004)
- Harbour City: Nanaimo in Transition, 1920–1967 (2006)
- A Place in Time: Nanaimo Chronicles (2008)
- Kilts on the Coast: The Scots Who Built BC (2012)
- Port Alberni: More Than Just a Mill Town (2014)
- Mark Bate: Nanaimo's First Mayor (2017)
