= 2015 Men's Oceania Cup =

Field hockey tournament

2015 Oceania Cup
Tournament details
- Host country: New Zealand
- City: Stratford
- Dates: 21–25 October
- Venue: TET MultiSports Centre

Final positions
- Champions: Australia (9th title)
- Runner-up: New Zealand
- Third place: Fiji

Tournament statistics
- Matches played: 8
- Goals scored: 143 (17.88 per match)
- Top scorer: (Fiji) Leevan Dutta (12 goals)

The 2015 Men's Oceania Cup was the ninth edition of the men's field hockey tournament. It was held from 21 to 25 October in Stratford.

The tournament served as a qualifier for the 2016 Summer Olympics.

Australia won the tournament for the ninth time, defeating New Zealand 3–2 in the final.

== Teams ==
- Australia
- Fiji
- New Zealand
- Samoa

== Results ==
All times are local (NZDT).

=== Preliminary round ===
==== Pool ====
Pos	Team	Pld	W	D	L	GF	GA	GD	Pts	Qualification
1	Australia	3	3	0	0	56	1	+55	9	Advanced to Final
2	New Zealand (H)	3	2	0	1	50	3	+47	6	Advanced to Final
3	Fiji	3	1	0	2	20	29	−9	3	
4	Samoa	3	0	0	3	0	93	−93	0	

Source: FIH
Rules for classification: 1) points; 2) goal difference; 3) goals scored; 4) head-to-head result.
(H) Hosts

==== Fixtures ====
21 October 2015
11:30

Australia	17–0	Fiji
Govers 4', 15', 56'; Dawson 8'; Ciriello 10', 27'; Mitton 11', 37', 53'; Turner 18', 21', 33', 35'; Ogilvie 30'; Dwyer 33', 44'; Beltz 57'	Report

Umpires:
Kiran Parbhu (NZL)
John Wright (RSA)

21 October 2015
15:30

New Zealand	37–0	Samoa
Russell 3', 16', 60+'; Wilson 5', 5', 14', 15', 34', 41', 44'; Mitai-Wells 6', 18'; Coughlan 12', 14', 24', 35', 54'; Inglis 13', 31', 43', 55'; Woods 20'; Child 20', 31', 50'; Haig 25'; Jenness 29', 36', 39', 39', 41', 47', 60'; Archibald 46'; Muir 56'; Edwards 58', 59'	Report

Umpires:
Epeli Tukuca (FIJ)
Raghu Prasad (IND)

22 October 2015
15:30

Fiji	20–0	Samoa
Veitamana 3'; Ad. Smith 8', 16', 28', 34'; Al. Smith 11'; Saqacala 13', 30'; Fong 20', 24'; Dutta 26', 31', 41', 49', 52', 53', 55', 58'; Edwards 54', 55'	Report

Umpires:
James Unkles (AUS)
Kiran Parbhu (NZL)

22 October 2015
17:30

New Zealand	1–3	Australia
Inglis 55'	Report	Dwyer 1'; Craig 51'; Turner 57'

Umpires:
Raghu Prasad (IND)
John Wright (RSA)

24 October 2015
10:00

Australia	36–0	Samoa
Ockenden 2'; Ciriello 3'; Craig 7', 19', 37'; Ogilvie 9', 20', 32'; Deavin 12'; Dwyer 12', 28', 36', 44', 45', 54'; Mitton 17', 17', 45', 50'; Turner 19', 26', 31', 41'; Zalewski 22', 38'; Gohdes 29', 39', 51', 59', 60'; Kavanagh 32'; Govers 33', 51'; Carroll 43'; Beltz 53'; Dawson 60'	Report

Umpires:
Epeli Tukuca (FIJ)
John Wright (RSA)

24 October 2015
12:00

Fiji	0–12	New Zealand
	Report	Archibald 1', 25'; Child 10', 41'; Jenness 23'; Inglis 28', 39', 50'; Woods 33'; Russell 38', 44', 47'

Umpires:
James Unkles (AUS)
Kiran Prabhu (NZL)

=== Classification ===
==== Third and fourth place ====
25 October 2015
11:30

Fiji	11–1	Samoa
Dutta 9', 40', 42', 44'; Saqacala 14', 53'; Ad. Smith 18', 57', 58'; Edwards 23'; Al. Smith 31'	Report	Sega 54'

Umpires:
Kiran Prabhu (NZL)
James Unkles (AUS)

==== Final ====
25 October 2015
16:00

Australia	3–2	New Zealand
Turner 4'; Dwyer 6'; Mitton 44'	Report	Coughlan 20'; Russell 53'

Umpires:
Raghu Prasad (IND)
John Wright (RSA)

== Statistics ==
=== Final standings ===
As per statistical convention in field hockey, matches decided in extra time are counted as wins and losses, while matches decided by penalty shoot-outs are counted as draws.

Pos	Team	Pld	W	D	L	GF	GA	GD	Pts	Status
1st place, gold medalist(s)	Australia	4	4	0	0	59	3	+56	12	Qualified for 2016 Summer Olympics
2nd place, silver medalist(s)	New Zealand (H)	4	2	0	2	52	6	+46	6	
3	Fiji	4	2	0	2	31	30	+1	6	
3rd place, bronze medalist(s)	Samoa	4	0	0	4	1	104	−103	0	

Source: FIH
(H) Hosts

=== Goalscorers ===
There were 143 goals scored in 8 matches, for an average of 17.9 goals per match.

12 goals

- (Fiji) Leevan Dutta

10 goals

- (Australia) Jamie Dwyer
- (Australia) Glenn Turner

8 goals

- (Australia) Trent Mitton
- (New Zealand) Stephen Jenness
- (New Zealand) Hugo Inglis

7 goals

- (Fiji) Adrian Smith
- (New Zealand) Kane Russell
- (New Zealand) Nicholas Wilson

6 goals

- (New Zealand) James Coughlan

5 goals

- (Australia) Matthew Gohdes
- (Australia) Blake Govers
- (New Zealand) Simon Child

4 goals

- (Australia) Thomas Craig
- (Australia) Flynn Ogilvie
- (Fiji) James Saqacala

3 goals

- (Australia) Christopher Ciriello
- (Fiji) Jerome Edwards
- (New Zealand) Ryan Archibald

2 goals

- (Australia) Joshua Beltz
- (Australia) Matthew Dawson
- (Australia) Aran Zalewski
- (Fiji) Martin Fong
- (Fiji) Alsace Smith
- (New Zealand) Steven Edwards
- (New Zealand) Leo Mitai-Wells
- (New Zealand) Nicholas Woods

1 goal

- (Australia) Joel Carroll
- (Australia) Timothy Deavin
- (Australia) Fergus Kavanagh
- (Australia) Edward Ockenden
- (Fiji) Amenatave Veitamana
- (New Zealand) Nicholas Haig
- (New Zealand) George Muir
- (Samoa) Jonathan Sega
