= 2013 Men's Oceania Cup =

Field hockey tournament

2013 Oceania Cup
Tournament details
- Host country: New Zealand
- City: Stratford
- Dates: 30 October – 3 November
- Venue: TET MultiSports Centre

Final positions
- Champions: Australia (8th title)
- Runner-up: New Zealand
- Third place: Papua New Guinea

Tournament statistics
- Matches played: 8
- Goals scored: 110 (13.75 per match)
- Top scorer: (Australia) Russell Ford (9 goals)

The 2013 Men's Oceania Cup was the eighth edition of the men's field hockey tournament. It was held from 30 October to 3 November in Stratford.

The tournament served as a qualifier for the 2014 FIH World Cup.

Australia won the tournament for the eighth time, defeating New Zealand 5–2 in the final. Papua New Guinea finished in third place, defeating Samoa 3–0.

== Teams ==
- Australia
- New Zealand
- Papua New Guinea
- Samoa

== Results ==
All times are local (NZDT).

=== Preliminary round ===
==== Pool ====
Pos	Team	Pld	W	D	L	GF	GA	GD	Pts	Qualification
1	Australia	3	3	0	0	51	1	+50	9	Advanced to Final
2	New Zealand (H)	3	2	0	1	44	3	+41	6	Advanced to Final
3	Papua New Guinea	3	1	0	2	4	35	−31	3	
4	Samoa	3	0	0	3	1	61	−60	0	

Source: FIH
Rules for classification: 1) points; 2) goal difference; 3) goals scored; 4) head-to-head result.
(H) Hosts

==== Fixtures ====
30 October 2013
11:30

Australia	32–0	Samoa
Whetton 4', 52', 61'; Turner 4', 12', 21', 32', 45', 57'; Beale 6', 17', 70'; Dwyer 6', 19', 44', 56', 61'; Simpson 9', 40', 56'; Ciriello 14'; Zalewski 15'; Ford 15', 23', 24', 43', 68'; Wilson 30', 42'; Orchard 53'; Butturini 59'; Philpott 68'	Report

Umpires:
Epeli Tukuca (FIJ)
Zeke Newman (AUS)

30 October 2013
15:30

Papua New Guinea	0–18	New Zealand
	Report	Child 3'; Inglis 5', 19', 30'; Panchia 10', 49', 56'; Jenness 18', 28', 31', 33', 54', 62'; Hilton 20'; Bennett 26', 42'; Bartholomew 43'; Shaw 61'

Umpires:
Brendan Johnstone (NZL)
Ben de Young (AUS)

31 October 2013
15:30

Samoa	1–4	Papua New Guinea
T. Savaiinaea 66'	Report	Lowah 1'; Kanamon 34', 63'; S. Tapo 44'

Umpires:
Epeli Tukuca (FIJ)
Brendan Johnstone (NZL)

1 November 2013
11:00

New Zealand	1–3	Australia
Hilton 15'	Report	Wilson 16'; Ciriello 29'; Ford 33'

Umpires:
David Tomlinson (NZL)
Ben de Young (AUS)

2 November 2013
10:00

Australia	16–0	Papua New Guinea
Butturini 4', 21', 62'; Wilson 7'; Ford 10', 40'; Ciriello 14', 54'; Orchard 14', 42'; Dwyer 32', 52'; Whetton 43'; Ockenden 53'; Turner 63', 68'	Report

Umpires:
David Tomlinson (NZL)
Epeli Tukuca (FIJ)

2 November 2013
14:00

New Zealand	25–0	Samoa
Couzins 4', 51'; Burrows 7', 38', 66'; Inglis 13', 40'; Hilton 18', 26'; Edwards 19', 21'; S. Child 22', 28', 36'; Panchia 29', 33'; McAleese 35', 43'; Jenness 42', 53'; Bartholomew 48'; Bennett 56'; M. Child 58'; Tarrant 64'; Haig 68'	Report

Umpires:
Zeke Newman (AUS)
Brendan Johnstone (NZL)

=== Classification round ===
==== Third and fourth place ====
3 November 2013
11:30

Papua New Guinea	3–0	Samoa
D. Tapo 15', 67'; S. Tapo 48'	Report

Umpires:
Epeli Tukuca (FIJ)
Zeke Newman (AUS)

==== Final ====
3 November 2013
20:05

Australia	5–2	New Zealand
Wilson 26'; Whetton 32', 37'; Ford 58'; Simpson 62'	Report	Edwards 56'; Haig 69'

Umpires:
David Tomlinson (NZL)
Ben de Young (AUS)
