= 2017 Men's Oceania Cup =

Field hockey tournament

2017 Oceania Cup
Tournament details
- Host country: Australia
- City: Sydney
- Dates: 11–15 October
- Venue: Sydney Olympic Park

Final positions
- Champions: Australia (10th title)
- Runner-up: New Zealand
- Third place: Papua New Guinea

Tournament statistics
- Matches played: 4
- Goals scored: 61 (15.25 per match)
- Top scorer(s): (Australia) Thomas Wickham (Australia) Dylan Wotherspoon (7 goals)

The 2017 Men's Oceania Cup was the tenth edition of the men's field hockey tournament. It was held from 11 to 15 October in Sydney.

The tournament served as a qualifier for the 2018 FIH World Cup.

Australia won the tournament for the tenth time, defeating New Zealand 6–0 in the final.

== Teams ==
- Australia
- New Zealand
- Papua New Guinea

== Results ==
All times are local (AEDT).

=== Preliminary round ===
==== Pool ====
Pos	Team	Pld	W	D	L	GF	GA	GD	Pts	Qualification
1	Australia (H)	2	2	0	0	35	1	+34	6	Advanced to Final
2	New Zealand	2	1	0	1	20	5	+15	3	Advanced to Final
3	Papua New Guinea	2	0	0	2	0	49	−49	0	

Source: FIH
Rules for classification: 1) points; 2) goal difference; 3) goals scored; 4) head-to-head result.
(H) Hosts

==== Fixtures ====
11 October 2017
20:00

Australia	30–0	Papua New Guinea
Wotherspoon 4', 20', 30', 37', 60'; Beale 6', 20'; Mitton 9', 12', 12', 46'; Hayward 10', 13', 28'; Govers 15', 24', 32', 36', 49'; Wickham 19', 28', 33', 43', 43'; Knowles 19', 40'; Whetton 35'; Ockenden 38'; Beltz 54'; Dawson 59'	Report

Umpires:
Sam Doran (NZL)
Ben Grant (NZL)

12 October 2017
20:00

New Zealand	1–5	Australia
Harris 57'	Report	Hayward 14', 42'; Whetton 34'; Craig 56'; Wotherspoon 57'

Umpires:
Stephen Versteegh (AUS)
Ben Grant (NZL)

14 October 2017
15:00

Papua New Guinea	0–19	New Zealand
	Report	Bennett 3', 30'; Harris 8', 33', 45'; Phillips 14'; Panchia 16', 26', 38', 39'; Lane 18', 28', 60+'; Wilcox 20'; Coughlan 20'; Mitai-Wells 26'; Elder 42'; Ross 51'; Miskimmin 60'

Umpires:
Matthew Claxton (AUS)
Stephen Versteegh (AUS)

=== Classification ===
==== Final ====
15 October 2017
17:30

Australia	6–0	New Zealand
Wickham 3', 58'; Wotherspoon 5'; Whetton 17'; Zalewski 19', 45+'	Report

Umpires:
Stephen Versteegh (AUS)
Ben Grant (NZL)

== Statistics ==
=== Final standings ===
As per statistical convention in field hockey, matches decided in extra time are counted as wins and losses, while matches decided by penalty shoot-outs are counted as draws.

Pos	Team	Pld	W	D	L	GF	GA	GD	Pts	Status
1st place, gold medalist(s)	Australia (H)	3	3	0	0	41	1	+40	9	Qualified for 2018 FIH World Cup
2nd place, silver medalist(s)	New Zealand	3	1	0	2	20	11	+9	3	
3rd place, bronze medalist(s)	Papua New Guinea	2	0	0	2	0	49	−49	0	

Source: FIH
(H) Hosts

=== Goalscorers ===
There were 61 goals scored in 4 matches, for an average of 15.2 goals per match.

7 goals

- (Australia) Thomas Wickham
- (Australia) Dylan Wotherspoon

5 goals

- (Australia) Blake Govers
- (Australia) Jeremy Hayward

4 goals

- (Australia) Trent Mitton
- (New Zealand) Daniel Harris
- (New Zealand) Jared Panchia

3 goals

- (Australia) Jacob Whetton
- (New Zealand) Samuel Lane

2 goals

- (Australia) Daniel Beale
- (Australia) Mark Knowles
- (Australia) Aran Zalewski
- (New Zealand) Cory Bennett

1 goal

- (Australia) Joshua Beltz
- (Australia) Thomas Craig
- (Australia) Matthew Dawson
- (Australia) Edward Ockenden
- (New Zealand) James Coughlan
- (New Zealand) Nicholas Elder
- (New Zealand) Harrison Miskimmin
- (New Zealand) Leo Mitai-Wells
- (New Zealand) Hayden Phillips
- (New Zealand) Nicholas Ross
- (New Zealand) Mackenzie Wilcox
