= Hockey at the 2018 Commonwealth Games – Men's tournament =

2018 Commonwealth Games – Men's hockey
Tournament details
- Host country: Australia
- City: Gold Coast
- Dates: 5 – 14 April 2018
- Teams: 10
- Venue: Gold Coast Hockey Centre

Final positions
- Champions: Australia (6th title)
- Runner-up: New Zealand
- Third place: England

Tournament statistics
- Matches played: 27
- Goals scored: 117 (4.33 per match)
- Top scorer: (England) Sam Ward (9 goals)

The men's field hockey event at the 2018 Commonwealth Games was held at the Gold Coast Hockey Centre from 5 to 14 April 2018. Australia won the gold medal after defeating New Zealand 2–0 in the final, continuing their dominance in the event with a sixth consecutive gold medal, having won the men's tournament every time it has been held.

== Umpires ==
Twelve umpires for the men's event were appointed by the International Hockey Federation.

- Rawi Anbananthan (MAS)
- Tim Bond (NZL)
- Ben de Young (AUS)
- Jamie Hooper (WAL)
- Deepak Joshi (IND)
- Tyler Klenk (CAN)
- Eric Koh (MAS)
- Lim Hong Zhen (SGP)
- Sean Rapaport (RSA)
- David Sweetman (SCO)
- Paul Walker (ENG)
- Deon Nel (RSA)

== Results ==
All times are local (UTC+10)

=== Preliminary round ===
==== Pool A ====
Pos	Team	Pld	W	D	L	GF	GA	GD	Pts	Qualification
1	Australia (H)	4	4	0	0	16	2	+14	12	Advance to Semi-finals
2	New Zealand	4	3	0	1	18	6	+12	9	Advance to Semi-finals
3	Scotland	4	1	0	3	7	14	−7	3	5th–6th place match
4	Canada	4	1	0	3	3	12	−9	3	7th–8th place match
5	South Africa	4	1	0	3	4	14	−10	3	9th–10th place match

Source: FIH
Rules for classification: 1) points; 2) number of wins; 3) goal difference; 4) goals scored; 5) head-to-head results.
(H) Hosts

5 April 2018
21:30

South Africa	2–4	Scotland
Heyns 37'; Drummond 43'	Report	Harwood 6'; Bain 13', 46'; Forsyth 14'

Umpires:
Eric Koh (MAS)
Jamie Hooper (GBR)

6 April 2018
11:30

New Zealand	6–2	Canada
Russell 28'; Woods 31'; Muir 41'; Lett 42'; Jenness 42'; Inglis 60'	Report	Kirkpatrick 47'; Johnston 58'

Umpires:
Hong Zhen Lim (SGP)
Paul Walker (GBR)

7 April 2018
11:30

Canada	1–0	Scotland
Sarmento 11'	Report

Umpires:
Deepak Joshi (IND)
Paul Walker (ENG)

7 April 2018
16:30

Australia	4–0	South Africa
Mitton 30', 39'; Hayward 43'; Kleinschmidt 50'	Report

Umpires:
Anbananthan Rawi (MAS)
Tyler Klenk (CAN)

8 April 2018
16:30

New Zealand	6–0	South Africa
Russell 4', 25'; J. Panchia 26'; Woods 27'; Muir 50'; Ross 53'	Report

Umpires:
Jamie Hooper (WAL)
Paul Walker (ENG)

8 April 2018
21:30

Australia	6–1	Scotland
Zalewski 2'; Beale 2'; Wickham 13'; Wotherspoon 15'; Ogilvie 20'; Kleinschmidt 43'	Report	Harwood 23'

Umpires:
Eric Koh (MAS)
Anbananthan Rawi (MAS)

10 April 2018
11:30

New Zealand	5–2	Scotland
Russell 3', 30', 34'; J. Panchia 4'; Inglis 50'	Report	Forsyth 20', 53'

Umpires:
Anbananthan Rawi (MAS)
Deepak Joshi (IND)

10 April 2018
16:30

Australia	4–0	Canada
Wotherspoon 12', 14'; Hayward 15'; Mitton 54'	Report

Umpires:
David Sweetman (SCO)
Tim Bond (NZL)

11 April 2018
16:30

Australia	2–1	New Zealand
Whetton 20'; Mitton 57'	Report	Bennett 59'

Umpires:
David Sweetman (SCO)
Hong Zhen Lim (SGP)

11 April 2018
21:30

Canada	0–2	South Africa
	Report	Julius 31'; Rosenberg 60'

Umpires:
Jamie Hooper (WAL)
Tim Bond (NZL)

==== Pool B ====
Pos	Team	Pld	W	D	L	GF	GA	GD	Pts	Qualification
1	India	4	3	1	0	12	9	+3	10	Advance to Semi-finals
2	England	4	2	1	1	15	8	+7	7	Advance to Semi-finals
3	Malaysia	4	1	1	2	5	10	−5	4	5th–6th place match
4	Pakistan	4	0	4	0	6	6	0	4	7th–8th place match
5	Wales	4	0	1	3	6	11	−5	1	9th–10th place match

Source: FIH
Rules for classification: 1) points; 2) number of wins; 3) goal difference; 4) goals scored; 5) head-to-head results.

5 April 2018
19:30

Pakistan	1–1	Wales
Ali 39'	Report	Shipperley 33'

Umpires:
Sean Rapaport (RSA)
David Sweetman (GBR)

6 April 2018
09:30

England	7–0	Malaysia
Ward 14', 20'; Goodfield 21'; Gleghorne 27', 53'; Martin 49'; Roper 59'	Report

Umpires:
Tim Bond (NZL)
Ben de Young (AUS)

7 April 2018
09:30

Malaysia	3–0	Wales
Fitri 19' van Huizen 36'; Faizal 55'	Report

Umpires:
Tim Bond (NZL)
Sean Rapaport (RSA)

7 April 2018
14:30

India	2–2	Pakistan
D. Singh 13'; H. Singh 20'	Report	Md. Irfan Jr 39'; Ali 60'

Umpires:
Lim Hong Zhen (SGP)
David Sweetman (SCO)

8 April 2018
14:30

England	2–2	Pakistan
Gleghorne 34'; Ward 51'	Report	Md. Arslan 33'; Ali 57'

Umpires:
Ben de Young (AUS)
Sam Rapaport (RSA)

8 April 2018
19:30

India	4–3	Wales
D. Singh 16'; Mand. Singh 28'; H. Singh 57'; Sunil 59'	Report	Furlong 17', 45', 58'

Umpires:
David Sweetman (SCO)
Tyler Klenk (CAN)

10 April 2018
09:30

India	2–1	Malaysia
H. Singh 3', 44'	Report	Saari 16'

Umpires:
Lim Hong Zhen (SGP)
Tyler Klenk (CAN)

10 April 2018
14:30

England	3–2	Wales
Ward 38', 49', 57'	Report	Hawker 26'; Francis 30+'

Umpires:
Eric Koh (MAS)
Ben de Young (AUS)

11 April 2018
14:30

Malaysia	1–1	Pakistan
Ramadan 39'	Report	Shafqat 9'

Umpires:
Paul Walker (ENG)
Tyler Klenk (CAN)

11 April 2018
19:30

India	4–3	England
Manp. Singh 33'; R.P. Singh 51'; Kumar 59'; Mand. Singh 60'	Report	Condon 17'; Ansell 52'; Ward 56'

Umpires:
Sean Rapaport (RSA)
Rawi Anbananthan (MAS)

== Classification matches ==
=== Ninth and tenth place ===
13 April 2018
08:30

South Africa	2–3	Wales
Crowe 19'; Cassiem 46'	Report	Furlong 27'; Carson 27', 59'

Umpires:
Ben de Young (AUS)
Tyler Klenk (CAN)

=== Seventh and eighth place ===
13 April 2018
10:45

Canada	1–3	Pakistan
Kirkpatrick 12'	Report	Md. Arslan 34'; Ali 40'; Md. Irfan Jr. 57'

Umpires:
Eric Koh (MAS)
Tim Bond (NZ)

=== Fifth and sixth place ===
13 April 2018
16:15

Scotland	1–2	Malaysia
Forsyth 11'	Report	Shahril 21'; Amirol 39'

Umpires:
Deepak Joshi (IND)
Paul Walker (ENG)

== Medal round ==
Semi-finals
13 April 2018
Australia	2
England	1
13 April 2018
New Zealand	3
India	2

Gold-medal match
14 April 2018
Australia	2
New Zealand	0
Bronze-medal match
14 April 2018
England	2
India	1

=== Semi-finals ===
13 April 2018
19:30

Australia	2–1	England
Mitton 1', 49'	Report	Sloan 37'

Umpires:
Sean Rapaport (RSA)
David Sweetman (SCO)

13 April 2018
21:45

India	2–3	New Zealand
H. Singh 30', 56'	Report	Inglis 7'; Jenness 13'; Child 40'

Umpires:
Lim Hong Zhen (SGP)
Rawi Anbananthan (MAS)

=== Bronze-medal match ===
14 April 2018
19:00

England	2–1	India
Ward 7', 43'	Report	Kumar 27'

Umpires:
Rawi Anbananthan (MAS)
David Sweetman (SCO)

=== Gold-medal match ===
14 April 2018
21:15

Australia	2–0	New Zealand
Kleinschmidt 21'; Dawson 28'	Report

Umpires:
Sean Rapaport (RSA)
Lim Hong Zhen (SGP)

== Statistics ==
=== Final standings ===
As per statistical convention in field hockey, matches decided in extra time are counted as wins and losses, while matches decided by penalty shoot-outs are counted as draws.

Pos	Team	Pld	W	D	L	GF	GA	GD	Pts	Final result
1st place, gold medalist(s)	Australia (H)	6	6	0	0	20	3	+17	18	Gold Medal
2nd place, silver medalist(s)	New Zealand	6	4	0	2	21	10	+11	12	Silver Medal
3rd place, bronze medalist(s)	England	6	3	1	2	18	11	+7	10	Bronze Medal
4	India	6	3	1	2	15	14	+1	10	Fourth place
5	Malaysia	5	2	1	2	7	11	−4	7	Eliminated in group stage
6	Scotland	5	1	0	4	8	16	−8	3	Eliminated in group stage
7	Pakistan	5	1	4	0	9	7	+2	7	Eliminated in group stage
8	Canada	5	1	0	4	4	15	−11	3	Eliminated in group stage
9	Wales	5	1	1	3	9	13	−4	4	Eliminated in group stage
10	South Africa	5	1	0	4	6	17	−11	3	Eliminated in group stage

Source: FIH
(H) Hosts

=== Goalscorers ===
There were 117 goals scored in 27 matches, for an average of 4.33 goals per match.

9 goals

- (England) Samuel Ward

6 goals

- (Australia) Trent Mitton
- (India) Harmanpreet Singh
- (New Zealand) Kane Russell

4 goals

- (Pakistan) Ali Mubashar
- (Scotland) Alan Forsyth
- (Wales) Gareth Furlong

3 goals

- (Australia) Aaron Kleinschmidt
- (Australia) Dylan Wotherspoon
- (England) Mark Gleghorne
- (New Zealand) Hugo Inglis

2 goals

- (Australia) Jeremy Hayward
- (Canada) James Kirkpatrick
- (India) Varun Kumar
- (India) Dilpreet Singh
- (India) Mandeep Singh
- (Malaysia) Faizal Saari
- (New Zealand) Stephen Jenness
- (New Zealand) George Muir
- (New Zealand) Jared Panchia
- (New Zealand) Nic Woods
- (Pakistan) Mohammad Irfan Jr.
- (Pakistan) Arslan Qadir
- (Scotland) Kenneth Bain
- (Scotland) Robert Harwood
- (Wales) Tom Carson

1 goal

- (Australia) Daniel Beale
- (Australia) Matthew Dawson
- (Australia) Flynn Ogilvie
- (Australia) Jacob Whetton
- (Australia) Tom Wickham
- (Australia) Aran Zalewski
- (Canada) Gordon Johnston
- (Canada) Matthew Sarmento
- (England) Liam Ansell
- (England) David Condon
- (England) David Goodfield
- (England) Harry Martin
- (England) Phil Roper
- (England) Ian Sloan
- (India) Manpreet Singh
- (India) Rupinder Pal Singh
- (India) S.V. Sunil
- (Malaysia) Amirol Arshad
- (Malaysia) Ramadan Rosli
- (Malaysia) Shahril Saabah
- (Malaysia) Fitri Saari
- (Malaysia) Joel van Huizen
- (New Zealand) Cory Bennett
- (New Zealand) Marcus Child
- (New Zealand) Dane Lett
- (New Zealand) Nick Ross
- (Pakistan) Shafqat Rasool
- (South Africa) Dayaan Cassiem
- (South Africa) Ryan Crowe
- (South Africa) Timothy Drummond
- (South Africa) Gareth Heyns
- (South Africa) Ryan Julius
- (South Africa) Reza Rosenberg
- (Wales) Benjamin Francis
- (Wales) Luke Hawker
- (Wales) Rupert Shipperley

Source: FIH
