= Field hockey at the 2015 Pacific Games =

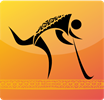
- Field hockey pictogram for the Games
- Venue: Sir John Guise Hockey Turf, Port Moresby
- Dates: 13–18 July
- Nations: 5

Field Hockey at the 2015 Pacific Games in Port Moresby, Papua New Guinea was held on July 13–18, 2015. The format was changed from the eleven-a-side hockey played at previous South Pacific Games to the five-a-side game.

== Medal summary ==
=== Medal table ===
Rank	Nation	Gold	Silver	Bronze	Total
1	Fiji	2	0	0	2
2	Papua New Guinea	0	1	1	2
2	Vanuatu	0	1	1	2
Totals (3 entries)		2	2	2	6

=== Medalists ===
Event	Gold	Silver	Bronze
Men	(Fiji) Fiji; Terence Corrie; James Edwards; Tevita King; Beniamino Lutua; Denzel Mock; Kristofer Mock; Adrian Smith; Hector Smith; Amenatave Veitamana	(Vanuatu) Vanuatu; Morres Aromalo; Henry Homry; Nalpinie Iasi; John Iawila; Michel John; John Johnas; Jerry Kalnangisu; Hiro Namu	(Papua New Guinea) Papua New Guinea; Eddie Gebo; Martin Kanamon; Milton Kisapai; Yahie Kusunan; Rex Loth; Hussein Lowah; MichaelPomat; Sapau Tapo; Nelson Tom
Women	(Fiji) Fiji; Tailah Ah Yuk; Maxine Browne; Lora Bukalidi; Tiara Dutta; Tessa-Maree Harman; Susana Mudunatagi; Melba Nautu; Lala Ravatu; Catherine Thaggard	(Papua New Guinea) Papua New Guinea; Alice Fred; Martina Dusty; Jessica Kevan; Terry Kiapin; Ruby Kisapai; Rosemary Miria; Carolyn Mulina; Vanessa Michael; Kari Raurela	(Vanuatu) Vanuatu; Roylani Apia; Anna Job; Kathleen Kalsav-Aru; Christina Kalsong; Evelyn Kalsong; Helen Kawiel; Belinda Nampas; Mary Siro; Jocelyn Toara

== See also ==
- Field hockey at the Pacific Games
