= Men's Oceania Cup =

International field hockey tournament

- Current season, competition or edition: 2025 Men's Oceania Cup
- Sport: Field hockey
- Founded: 1999; 27 years ago
- First season: 1999
- No. of teams: 2
- Confederation: OHF (Oceania)
- Most recent champion: Australia (13th title) (2025)
- Most titles: Australia (13 titles)

The Oceania Cup is an international men's field hockey competition organised by Oceania Hockey Federation (OHF). It is held every two years to determine which teams will receive an automatic berth to the Men's FIH Hockey World Cup and Summer Olympics.

Only Australia and New Zealand have reached the finals as of 2023. Australia has won all titles.

== Summaries ==
Year	Host	Final			Third place game		
Year	Host	Winner	Score	Runner-up	Third place	Score	Fourth place
1999; Details	Brisbane, Australia	Australia	Round-robin	New Zealand	Only two teams		
2001; Details	Melbourne, Australia	Australia	Round-robin	New Zealand	Only two teams		
2003; Details	Christchurch & Wellington, New Zealand	Australia	Round-robin	New Zealand	Only two teams		
2005; Details	Suva, Fiji	Australia	5–1	New Zealand	Fiji	Only three teams	
2007; Details	Buderim, Australia	Australia	3–1	New Zealand	Papua New Guinea	Only three teams	
2009; Details	Invercargill, New Zealand	Australia	3–1	New Zealand	Samoa	Only three teams	
2011; Details	Hobart, Australia	Australia	Round-robin	New Zealand	Only two teams		
2013; Details	Stratford, New Zealand	Australia	5–2	New Zealand	Papua New Guinea	3–0	Samoa
2015; Details	Stratford, New Zealand	Australia	3–2	New Zealand	Fiji	11–1	Samoa
2017; Details	Sydney, Australia	Australia	6–0	New Zealand	Papua New Guinea	Only three teams	
2019; Details	Rockhampton, Australia	Australia	Round-robin	New Zealand	Only two teams		
2023; Details	Whangārei, New Zealand	Australia	Round-robin	New Zealand	Only two teams		
2025; Details	Darwin, Australia	Australia	Round-robin	New Zealand	Only two teams		

== Medal table ==
Rank	Nation	Gold	Silver	Bronze	Total
1	Australia	13	0	0	13
2	New Zealand	0	13	0	13
3	Papua New Guinea	0	0	3	3
4	Fiji	0	0	2	2
5	Samoa	0	0	1	1
Totals (5 entries)		13	13	6	32

== Team appearances ==
Team	(Australia) 1999	(Australia) 2001	(New Zealand) 2003	(Fiji) 2005	(Australia) 2007	(New Zealand) 2009	(Australia) 2011	(New Zealand) 2013	(New Zealand) 2015	(Australia) 2017	(Australia) 2019	(New Zealand) 2023	(Australia) 2025	Total
Australia	1st	1st	1st	1st	1st	1st	1st	1st	1st	1st	1st	1st	1st	13
Fiji	–	–	–	3rd	–	–	–	–	3rd	–	–	–	–	2
New Zealand	2nd	2nd	2nd	2nd	2nd	2nd	2nd	2nd	2nd	2nd	2nd	2nd	2nd	13
Papua New Guinea	–	–	–	–	3rd	–	–	3rd	–	3rd	–	–	–	3
Samoa	–	–	–	–	–	3rd	–	4th	4th	–	–	–	–	3
Total	2	2	2	3	3	3	2	4	4	3	2	2	2	

== Statistics ==
=== All-Time Table ===
Table
Pos	Team	Pld	W	D	L	GF	GA	GD	Pts	PCT
1	Australia	38	32	3	3	324	46	+278	99	86.8
2	Fiji	6	2	0	4	31	71	–41	6	33.3
3	New Zealand	38	11	3	24	192	106	+86	36	31.6
4	Papua New Guinea	8	2	0	6	8	120	–112	6	25.0
5	Samoa	10	0	0	10	2	213	–211	0	0.0

== See also ==
- Field hockey at the Pacific Games
- Women's Oceania Cup
