= 2026 Women's Summer of Hockey Series =

Tournament details
- Host country: New Zealand
- City: Dunedin
- Dates: 21–25 January
- Teams: 4 (from 3 confederations)
- Venue: Alexander McMillan Hockey Centre

Final positions
- Champions: United States (1st title)
- Runner-up: New Zealand
- Third place: New Zealand A

Tournament statistics
- Matches played: 8
- Goals scored: 28 (3.5 per match)
- Top scorer(s): (New Zealand) Hannah Cotter (United States) Abigail Tamer (3 goals)

The 2026 Women's Summer of Hockey Series is an upcoming field hockey tournament hosted by the New Zealand Hockey Federation. The tournament will be held in Dunedin, New Zealand, from 21 to 25 January 2026.

The national teams of Japan, New Zealand and the United States will compete in the tournament, alongside a development team from New Zealand.

== Participating nations ==
Japan

Head Coach: Akira Takahashi

1. Akio Tanaka (GK)
2. Miyu Suzuki
3. Ikumi Matsu
4. Hanami Saito
5. Nanako Tateiwa
6. Emi Nishikori
7. Mayuri Horikawa
8. Shiho Kobayakawa
9. Mai Toriyama
10. Amiru Shimada (C)
11. Akari Nakagomi
13. Hiroka Murayama
16. Saki Tanaka
17. Miyu Hasegawa
18. Ku Yudo (GK)
19. Maho Ueno
20. Mei Matsunami
21. Rui Takashima
22. Ai Hiramatsu
32. Junon Kawai
New Zealand

Head Coach: Philip Burrows

2. Olivia Shannon (C)
3. Ella Hyatt Brown
6. Hope Ralph
8. Hannah Cotter
9. Emelia Surridge
11. Casey Crowley
12. Tessa Reid
13. Josephine Murray
15. Grace O'Hanlon (GK)
16. Elizabeth Thompson
18. Anna Crowley
23. Jessica Anderson
26. Kaitlin Cotter
27. Holly Pearson
28. Hannah Gravenall
31. Riana Pho
34. Julia Gluyas (GK)
38. Brittany Wang
40. Rebecca Baker
43. Emma Rainey
New Zealand A
2. Anna Willocks (C)
3. Isabella Ambrosius
4. Nina Murphy
5. Rose Tynan
6. Lucy Bannattyne
8. Sophie Hildesley
9. Ruby Baker
10. Madeline Harris
11. Lucy Russ
12. Madison Doar
14. Millie Calder
15. Tyla Goodsell-Matthews
16. Ruby Roberts
17. Isabella Story
19. Leah Hodges
20. Kaea Elliott
22. Katie Bond
39. Brodie Cochrane (GK)
40. Saasha Marsters (GK)
United States

Head Coach: (Republic of Ireland) David Passmore

1. Abigail Tamer
2. Meredith Sholder (C)
4. Sophia Gladieux
8. Madeleine Zimmer
9. Hope Rose
11. Katie Dixon
13. Ashley Hoffman
14. Sanne Caarls
16. Emma DeBerdine
17. Elizabeth Yeager
18. Claire Danahy
20. Leah Crouse
23. Caroline Ramsey
24. Kelee Lepage
26. Lucy Adams
27. Ryleigh Heck
29. Bethany Dykema
30. Kealsie Reeb (GK)
31. Kelsey Bing (GK)
34. Lauren Wadas
37. Makenna Webster

== Officials ==
The following umpires were appointed by the New Zealand Hockey Federation and the FIH to officiate the tournament:

- Erika Barbera (USA)
- Kelly-Anne Foskin (NZL)
- Kelly Hudson (NZL)
- Kristy Robertson (AUS)

== Results ==
All times are local (NZDT).

=== Preliminary round ===
==== Standings ====
Pos	Team	Pld	W	D	L	GF	GA	GD	Pts	Qualification
1	United States	3	3	0	0	10	2	+8	9	Final
2	New Zealand (H)	3	2	0	1	6	3	+3	6	Final
3	Japan	3	1	0	2	4	7	−3	3	
4	New Zealand A	3	0	0	3	4	12	−8	0	

Source: FIH
Rules for classification: 1) points; 2) matches won; 3) goal difference; 4) goals for; 5) head-to-head result; 6) field goals scored.
(H) Hosts

==== Fixtures ====
21 January 2026
16:30

Japan	4–2	New Zealand A
Takashima 6'; S. Tanaka 33'; Murayama 37'; Hasegawa 49'	Report	Willocks 13'; Baker 52'

Umpires:
Erika Barbera (USA)
Kelly-Anne Foskin (NZL)

21 January 2026
18:30

New Zealand	1–2	United States
H. Cotter 23'	Report	Ramsey 37'; Tamer 57'

Umpires:
Kelly Hudson (NZL)
Kristy Robertson (AUS)

22 January 2026
16:30

United States	4–0	Japan
Hoffman 13'; Sholder 40'; Heck 43'; Yeager 49'	Report

Umpires:
Kristy Robertson (AUS)
Kelly-Anne Foskin (NZL)

22 January 2026
18:30

New Zealand	4–1	New Zealand A
H. Cotter 33'; Shannon 42'; Surridge 52'; Pho 58'	Report	Willocks 6'

Umpires:
Kelly Hudson (NZL)
Erika Barbera (USA)

24 January 2026
14:00

United States	4–1	New Zealand A
Tamer 5'; DeBerdine 16'; Zimmer 17'; Yeager 25'	Report	Baker 60'

Umpires:
Kelly-Anne Foskin (NZL)
Kelly Hudson (NZL)

24 January 2026
16:00

New Zealand	1–0	Japan
Gravenall 53'	Report

Umpires:
Erika Barbera (USA)
Kristy Robertson (AUS)

=== Classification round ===
==== Third and fourth place ====
25 January 2026
14:00

Japan	0–1	New Zealand A
	Report	Bond 25'

Umpires:
Erika Barbera (USA)
Kelly-Anne Foskin (NZL)

==== Final ====
25 January 2026
16:00

United States	2–1	New Zealand
Tamer 29'; Gladieux 43'	Report	H. Cotter 32'

Umpires:
Kelly Hudson (NZL)
Kristy Robertson (AUS)

== Goalscorers ==
There were 28 goals scored in 8 matches, for an average of 3.5 goals per match.

3 goals

- (New Zealand) Hannah Cotter
- (United States) Abigail Tamer

2 goals

- (New Zealand) Ruby Baker (A)
- (New Zealand) Anna Willocks (A)
- (United States) Elizabeth Yeager

1 goal

- (Japan) Miyu Hasegawa
- (Japan) Hiroka Murayama
- (Japan) Rui Takashima
- (Japan) Saki Tanaka
- (New Zealand) Hannah Gravenall
- (New Zealand) Riana Pho
- (New Zealand) Olivia Shannon
- (New Zealand) Emelia Surridge
- (New Zealand) Katie Bond (A)
- (United States) Emma DeBerdine
- (United States) Sophia Gladieux
- (United States) Ryleigh Heck
- (United States) Ashley Hoffman
- (United States) Caroline Ramsey
- (United States) Meredith Sholder
- (United States) Madeleine Zimmer

Source: FIH, NZHF
