= 2022–23 Women's FIH Pro League squads =

This article lists the squads of all participating teams in the 2022–23 FIH Pro League. The nine national teams involved in the tournament were required to register a squad of up to 32 players.

== Argentina ==
The following is the Argentina squad for the 2022–23 FIH Pro League.

Head coach: Fernando Ferrara

2. Sofía Toccalino
3. Agustina Gorzelany
4. Valentina Raposo
5. Agostina Alonso (C)
6. Emilia Forcherio
7. Agustina Albertario
10. María José Granatto
11. Delfina Thome
13. Cristina Cosentino (GK)
14. Clara Barberi (GK)
15. Ana Luz Dodorico (GK)
16. Bárbara Dichiara
17. Rocío Sánchez Moccia (C)
18. Victoria Sauze (C)
19. Victoria Manuele
20. Sofía Cairó
21. Lucina von der Heyde
22. Eugenia Trinchinetti
24. Celina di Santo
25. Jimena Cedrés
26. Pilar Campoy
28. Julieta Jankunas
29. Victoria Miranda
30. Martina Triñanes
31. Valentina Marcucci
32. Valentina Costa Biondi
33. Gianella Palet
34. Lucía Sanguinetti
35. Bianca Donati
36. Magdalena Fernández Ladra
37. Inés Delpech
38. Constanza Cerundolo
39. Paula Ortiz
40. Juana Fajardo
41. Milagros Fernández Ladra
42. Guadalupe Adorno
43. Sol Pagella
44. Sol Lombardo
45. Catalina Andrade
46. Daiana Pacheco
47. Mariana Pineda
48. Lourdes Pérez Iturraspe (GK)
49. Alina Piccardo
50. Juana Castellaro

== Australia ==
The following is the Australia squad for the 2022–23 FIH Pro League.

Head coach: Katrina Powell

1. Claire Colwill
2. Ambrosia Malone
3. Brooke Peris (C)
4. Amy Lawton
5. Grace Young
6. Penny Squibb
7. Aleisha Power (GK)
8. Georgia Wilson
9. Shanea Tonkin
10. Madison Fitzpatrick
11. Meg Pearce
12. Greta Hayes
13. Harriet Shand
14. Stephanie Kershaw
15. Kaitlin Nobbs
16. Courtney Schonell
18. Jane Claxton (C)
19. Jocelyn Bartram (GK)
20. Karri Somerville
21. Renee Taylor
22. Tatum Stewart
24. Mariah Williams
28. Hannah Cullum-Sanders
29. Rebecca Greiner
30. Grace Stewart
33. Alice Arnott
35. Maddison Brooks
40. Phillipa Morgan
41. Zoe Newman (GK)
42. Maddison Smith
44. Abigail Wilson

== Belgium ==
The following is the Belgium squad for the 2022–23 FIH Pro League.

Head coach: (Netherlands) Raoul Ehren

3. Justine Rasir
5. Abigail Raye
6. Charlotte Englebert
7. Judith Vandermeiren
8. Emma Puvrez
9. Emily White
10. Louise Versavel
13. Alix Gerniers (C)
16. Tiphaine Duquesne
17. Michelle Struijk (C)
18. Shaunda Ikegwuonu
19. Barbara Nelen (C)
20. Pauline de Ryck (GK)
21. Aisling D'Hooghe (GK)
22. Stéphanie Vanden Borre
23. Elena Sotgiu (GK)
25. Pauline Leclef
26. Lien Hillewaert
27. Loes Palfliet
29. Elodie Picard (GK)
30. Ambre Ballenghien
31. Lucie Breyne
32. Delphine Marien
33. Alexia 't Serstevens
34. Vanessa Blockmans
35. Anne-Sophie Roels
36. Hélène Brasseur
37. France de Mot
40. Camille Belis
41. Astrid Bonami
42. Elizabeth Mommens

== China ==
The following is the China squad for the 2022–23 FIH Pro League.

Head coach: (Australia) Alyson Annan

1. Ye Jiao (GK)
2. Gu Bingfeng
3. Yang Liu
5. Li Jiaqi (C)
6. Zhang Ying
7. Cui Qiuxia
8. Gu Yangyan
9. Ma Ning
10. Zhang Xindan
11. Liang Meiyu
12. Zhu Liyu
13. Li Hong
15. Yuan Meng
16. Ou Zixia (C)
17. Dan Wen
18. Zou Meirong
19. Zhang Xiaoxue
20. He Jiangxin
21. Zheng Jiali
23. Fan Yunxia
24. Wang Na
25. Yang Haoting
26. Chen Yang
27. Xu Wenyu
28. Luo Tiantian
29. Liu Ping (GK)
30. Ouyang Huarui (GK)
31. Zhong Jiaqi
32. Li Xinhuan (GK)

== Germany ==
The following is the Germany squad for the 2022–23 FIH Pro League.

Head coach: Valentin Altenburg

1. Noelle Rother (GK)
2. Kira Horn
3. Amelie Wortmann
4. Nike Lorenz (C)
5. Selin Oruz
8. Anne Schröder
9. Elisa Gräve
10. Lisa Nolte
11. Lena Micheel
12. Charlotte Stapenhorst
13. Charlotte Gerstenhöfer
15. Nathalie Kubalski (GK)
16. Sonja Zimmermann (C)
17. Pauline Heinz
18. Lilly Stoffelsma
19. Maike Schaunig
20. Sara Strauss
21. Cécile Pieper
22. Emma Davidsmeyer
23. Pia Maertens
24. Viktoria Huse
25. Katharina Kiefer
28. Jette Fleschütz
29. Emma Boermans
30. Hanna Granitzki
31. Linnea Weidemann
33. Jule Bleuel
35. Benedetta Wenzel
40. Mali Wichmann (GK)
41. Lena Frerichs
44. Stine Kurz
50. Nele Aring
55. Felicia Wiedermann
71. Laura Saenger
99. Carlotta Sippel

== Great Britain ==
The following is the Great Britain squad for the 2022–23 FIH Pro League.

Head coach: (Scotland) David Ralph

1. Madeleine Hinch (GK)
2. Darcy Bourne
3. Amy Tennant (GK)
4. Laura Unsworth
6. Anna Toman
7. Hannah Martin
8. Sarah Jones
9. Amy Costello
10. Sarah Robertson
11. Holly Hunt
12. Charlotte Watson
13. Elena Rayer
14. Tessa Howard
15. Fiona Burnet
16. Isabelle Petter
18. Giselle Ansley
19. Olivia Hamilton
20. Hollie Pearne-Webb (C)
21. Fiona Crackles
22. Elizabeth Neal
23. Sophie Hamilton
24. Shona McCallin
25. Sabbie Heesh (GK)
26. Lily Owsley
27. Joanne Hunter
28. Flora Peel
29. Jennifer Eadie
30. Martha Taylor
31. Grace Balsdon
32. Kate Axford
40. Miriam Pritchard (GK)
41. Lily Walker
42. Alexandra Malzer

== Netherlands ==
The following is the Netherlands squad for the 2022–23 FIH Pro League.

Head coach: Paul van Ass

1. Anne Veenendaal (GK)
2. Luna Fokke
3. Rosa Fernig
4. Freeke Moes
5. Lisa Post
6. Laurien Leurink
7. Xan de Waard (C)
8. Yibbi Jansen
9. Renée van Laarhoven
10. Felice Albers
11. Maria Verschoor
12. Lidewij Welten
13. Sabine Plönissen
14. Sanne Koolen
15. Frédérique Matla
16. Joosje Burg
17. Marente Barentsen
18. Pien Sanders
19. Marijn Veen
20. Laura Nunnink
21. Pien Dicke
22. Josine Koning (GK)
23. Margot van Geffen
25. Kyra Fortuin
26. Elzemiek Zandee
27. Marleen Jochems
30. Julia Remmerswaal (GK)

== New Zealand ==
The following is the New Zealand squad for the 2022–23 FIH Pro League.

Head coach: Darren Smith

1. Tarryn Davey
2. Olivia Shannon
3. Alexandra Lukin
4. Olivia Merry (C)
5. Frances Davies
6. Hope Ralph
7. Aniwaka Haumaha
8. Hannah Cotter
9. Ella Hyatt Brown
10. Brooke Roberts (GK)
11. Casey Crowley
14. Tyler Lench
15. Grace O'Hanlon (GK)
16. Elizabeth Thompson
17. Stephanie Dickins
18. Anna Crowley
19. Tessa Jopp
20. Megan Hull (C)
21. Alia Jaques
22. Katie Doar
26. Kaitlin Cotter
27. Holly Pearson
29. Madison Doar
30. Louisa Tuilotolava
32. Rose Tynan
35. Kirsten Nation (GK)
37. Isabella Gill
41. Jessica Kelly
43. Rebecca Baker
44. Paige Blake
45. Kayla Reed
46. Brittany Wang

== United States ==
The following is the United States squad for the 2022–23 FIH Pro League.

Head coach: (Republic of Ireland) David Passmore

1. Abigail Tamer
2. Lauren Moyer
3. Ashley Sessa
4. Danielle Grega
5. Olivia Bent-Cole
6. Megan Rodgers
7. Jillian Wolgemuth
8. Brooke DeBerdine
9. Madeleine Zimmer
10. Emma DeBerdine
11. Julianna Tornetta
12. Amanda Golini (C)
13. Ashley Hoffman
14. Kelsey Farkas
15. Fusine Govaert
16. Linnea Gonzales
17. Elizabeth Yeager
18. Alia Marshall
19. Josie Hollamon
20. Leah Crouse
21. Alexandra Hammel
22. Jacqueline Sumfest
23. Mackenzie Allessie
24. Kelee Lepage
25. Karlie Kisha
26. Hope Rose
27. Charlotte de Vries
28. Mia Abello
29. Nathalie Friedman
30. Kealsie Robles (GK)
31. Kelsey Bing (GK)
32. Jennifer Rizzo (GK)
33. Ryleigh Heck
34. Paityn Worth
35. Sanne Caarls
36. Meredith Sholder
37. Caroline Ramsey
40. Natalie Konerth
