= Field hockey at the 2024 Summer Olympics – Women's team squads =

This article shows the squads of all participating teams at the women's field hockey tournament at the 2024 Summer Olympics in Paris.

Age, caps and club as of 27 July 2024.

== Group A ==
=== Belgium ===
The squad was announced on 17 June 2024.

Head coach: (Netherlands) Raoul Ehren

No.	Pos.	Player	Date of birth (age)	Caps	Club
3	FW	Justine Rasir	4 December 2001 (aged 22)	70	(Belgium) Racing
4	FW	Delphine Marien	27 March 2002 (aged 22)	37	(Belgium) Dragons
5		Abigail Raye	17 May 1991 (aged 33)	141	
6	FW	Charlotte Englebert	20 May 2001 (aged 23)	70	(Netherlands) Den Bosch
7	MF	Judith Vandermeiren	10 August 1994 (aged 29)	237	(Belgium) Braxgata
8	DF	Emma Puvrez	25 July 1997 (aged 27)	199	(Netherlands) Tilburg
9	FW	Emily White	20 September 2004 (aged 19)	22	(Belgium) Waterloo Ducks
13	MF	Alix Gerniers (Captain)	29 June 1993 (aged 31)	269	(Belgium) Gantoise
15	DF	Vanessa Blockmans	4 April 2002 (aged 22)	44	(Belgium) Waterloo Ducks
17	MF	Michelle Struijk	24 June 1998 (aged 26)	121	(Belgium) Gantoise
19	MF	Barbara Nelen (Captain)	20 August 1991 (aged 32)	324	(Belgium) Gantoise
21	GK	Aisling D'Hooghe	25 August 1994 (aged 29)	229	(Belgium) Waterloo Ducks
22	DF	Stéphanie Vanden Borre	14 September 1997 (aged 26)	186	(Belgium) Braxgata
26	DF	Lien Hillewaert	27 November 1997 (aged 26)	137	(Belgium) Braxgata
29	GK	Elodie Picard	8 September 1997 (aged 26)	49	(Belgium) Royal Antwerp
30	FW	Ambre Ballenghien	13 December 2000 (aged 23)	83	(Belgium) Gantoise
31	DF	Lucie Breyne	5 October 2000 (aged 23)	64	(Belgium) Waterloo Ducks
36	DF	Hélène Brasseur	4 January 2002 (aged 22)	59	(Belgium) Gantoise
40	MF	Camille Belis	23 October 2004 (aged 19)	33	(Belgium) Braxgata

=== China ===
Head coach: (Australia) Alyson Annan

No.	Pos.	Player	Date of birth (age)	Caps	Goals	Club
1	GK	Ye Jiao	21 October 1994 (aged 29)	108	0	(China) Sichuan
2	DF	Gu Bingfeng	24 January 1994 (aged 30)	174	107	(China) Liaoning
3	DF	Yang Liu	1 September 1998 (aged 25)	52	1	(China) Sichuan
6	MF	Zhang Ying	29 August 1998 (aged 25)	72	19	(China) Jiangsu
7	FW	Chen Yi	28 January 1997 (aged 27)	62	12	(China) Sichuan
9	MF	Ma Ning	29 September 2000 (aged 23)	73	9	(China) Jilin
13	MF	Li Hong	31 May 1999 (aged 25)	136	17	(China) Tianjin
16	DF	Ou Zixia (Captain)	24 September 1995 (aged 28)	167	14	(China) Sichuan
17	MF	Dan Wen	14 June 1999 (aged 25)	96	8	(China) Sichuan
18	MF	Zou Meirong	1 September 2000 (aged 23)	51	16	(China) Sichuan
20	MF	He Jiangxin	19 August 1997 (aged 26)	102	1	(China) Sichuan
23	MF	Fan Yunxia	7 December 2002 (aged 21)	24	1	(China) Jiangsu
26	MF	Chen Yang	15 February 1997 (aged 27)	116	14	(China) Liaoning
27	MF	Xu Wenyu	6 December 1995 (aged 28)	107	4	(China) Sichuan
31	FW	Zhong Jiaqi	23 September 1999 (aged 24)	119	45	(China) Guangdong
35	DF	Tan Jinzhuang	27 January 2003 (aged 21)	25	1	(China) Sichuan
58	FW	Yu Anhui	30 April 2001 (aged 23)	24		

Reserves:

- Liu Ping (GK)
- Zhou Yu

=== France ===
The squad was announced on 8 July 2024.

Head coach: Gaël Foulard

No.	Pos.	Player	Date of birth (age)	Caps	Goals	Club
3	DF	Catherine Clot	30 April 1997 (aged 27)	24	0	(Netherlands) Almeerse
4	MF	Emma Ponthieu (captain)	9 March 1996 (aged 28)	83	2	(Belgium) Racing
5	FW	Mickaela Lahlah	4 December 2001 (aged 22)	41	1	(France) Cambrai
7	FW	Paola Le Nindre	16 June 2006 (aged 18)	21	5	Racing Club de France
8	FW	Yohanna Lhopital	18 September 1999 (aged 24)	65	21	(Belgium) Waterloo Ducks
10	FW	Philippine Delemazure	10 September 2005 (aged 18)	20	6	(France) Lille
14	MF	Gabrielle Verrier	18 July 1997 (aged 27)	29	3	(Belgium) Royal Evere White Star
17	FW	Victoire Arnaud	26 December 2001 (aged 22)	41	4	(Belgium) Royal Wellington THC
18	DF	Guusje van Bolhuis	6 January 2001 (aged 23)	53	6	(Belgium) Leuven
19	DF	Mathilde Duffrène	19 March 2005 (aged 19)	24	6	(Belgium) Royal Pingouin
22	FW	Eve Verzura	2 April 2002 (aged 22)	45	11	(Belgium) Royal Léopold Club
23	MF	Inès Lardeur	26 March 1996 (aged 28)	93	12	(Belgium) Royal Léopold Club
24	GK	Lucie Ehrmann	31 January 1998 (aged 26)	26	0	(Netherlands) Den Bosch
25	MF	Albane Garot	6 July 1998 (aged 26)	53	1	(Germany) Harvestehuder THC
27	DF	Delfina Gaspari	30 April 1998 (aged 26)	62	6	(Belgium) La Gantoise
28	MF	Tessa-Margot Schubert	9 June 1996 (aged 28)	33	2	(Germany) Düsseldorfer HC
31	GK	Mathilde Petriaux	23 July 1997 (aged 27)	58	0	

Reserves:

- Alice Lesgourgues
- Marie Simon

=== Germany ===
The squad was announced on 13 June 2024.

Head coach: Valentin Altenburg

No.	Pos.	Player	Date of birth (age)	Caps	Goals	Club
2	DF	Kira Horn	12 February 1995 (aged 29)	87	3	(Germany) Club an der Alster
3	MF	Amelie Wortmann	21 October 1996 (aged 27)	108	5	(Germany) UHC Hamburg
4	MF	Nike Lorenz (Captain)	12 March 1997 (aged 27)	178	78	(Germany) Rot-Weiss Köln
5	MF	Selin Oruz	5 February 1997 (aged 27)	160	7	(Germany) Düsseldorfer HC
6	DF	Benedetta Wenzel	31 March 1997 (aged 27)	50	2	(Germany) Berliner HC
8	MF	Anne Schröder	11 September 1994 (aged 29)	207	31	(Germany) Club an der Alster
10	FW	Lisa Nolte	5 February 2001 (aged 23)	34	6	(Germany) Düsseldorfer HC
11	MF	Lena Micheel	29 April 1998 (aged 26)	108	20	(Germany) UHC Hamburg
12	FW	Charlotte Stapenhorst	15 June 1995 (aged 29)	169	84	(Germany) Zehlendorfer Wespen
15	GK	Nathalie Kubalski	3 September 1993 (aged 30)	49	0	(Netherlands) Nijmegen
16	MF	Sonja Zimmermann	15 June 1999 (aged 25)	98	27	(Netherlands) Amsterdam
22	MF	Cécile Pieper	31 August 1994 (aged 29)	191		
23		Emma Davidsmeyer	30 March 1999 (aged 25)	39		
25	DF	Viktoria Huse	24 October 1995 (aged 28)	117	20	(Germany) Club an der Alster
26	MF	Felicia Wiedermann	28 January 2002 (aged 22)	21	3	(Germany) Rot-Weiss Köln
27	DF	Stine Kurz	20 May 2000 (aged 24)	34	3	(Germany) Mannheimer HC
28	FW	Jette Fleschütz	23 October 2002 (aged 21)	60	18	(Germany) Großflottbeker THGC
31	DF	Linnea Weidemann	15 September 2003 (aged 20)	43	0	(Germany) Berliner HC

Reserves:

- Julia Sonntag (GK)

=== Japan ===
The squad was announced on 14 June 2024.

Head coach: (India) Jude Menezes

No.	Pos.	Player	Date of birth (age)	Caps	Goals	Club
1	GK	Eika Nakamura	4 March 1996 (aged 28)	54	0	(Japan) Coca–Cola Red Sparks
5	DF	Yu Asai	8 January 1996 (aged 28)	124	8	(Japan) Coca–Cola Red Sparks
7	DF	Miyu Suzuki	8 January 1999 (aged 25)	74	7	(Japan) Sony HC Bravia Ladies
9	FW	Yuri Nagai (Captain)	26 May 1992 (aged 32)	232	78	(Japan) Sony HC Bravia Ladies
10	MF	Hazuki Nagai	15 August 1994 (aged 29)	219	65	(Japan) Sakai Town
11	DF	Shihori Oikawa	12 March 1989 (aged 35)	186	55	(Japan) Tokyo Verdy Hockey Team
13	DF	Miki Kozuka	13 January 1996 (aged 28)	116	2	(Japan) GlaxoSmithKline Orange United
17	FW	Shiho Kobayakawa	12 April 1999 (aged 25)	49	11	(Japan) Coca–Cola Red Sparks
19	FW	Kanon Mori	1 May 1996 (aged 28)	62	22	(Japan) Coca–Cola Red Sparks
21	FW	Mai Toriyama	13 April 1995 (aged 29)	61	16	(Japan) Nanto Bank SHOOTING STARS
23	MF	Saki Tanaka	18 September 1998 (aged 25)	18	2	(Japan) GlaxoSmithKline Orange United
25	DF	Kana Urata	27 December 1998 (aged 25)	51	9	(Japan) Coca–Cola Red Sparks
26	MF	Amiru Shimada	23 June 1998 (aged 26)	50	7	(Japan) Nanto Bank SHOOTING STARS
29	MF	Sakurako Omoto	19 March 1998 (aged 26)	77	2	(Japan) Coca–Cola Red Sparks
36	FW	Miyu Hasegawa	20 November 2001 (aged 22)	28	9	(Japan) Sony HC Bravia Ladies
37	DF	Rika Ogawa	28 July 1994 (aged 29)	23	2	(Japan) Sony HC Bravia Ladies

Reserves:

- Chiko Fujibayashi
- Rui Takashima
- Akio Tanaka (GK)

=== Netherlands ===
The squad was announced on 28 May 2024.

Head Coach: Paul van Ass

No.	Pos.	Player	Date of birth (age)	Caps	Goals	Club
1	GK	Anne Veenendaal	7 September 1995 (aged 28)	118	0	(Netherlands) Amsterdam
2	MF	Luna Fokke	9 March 2001 (aged 23)	35	6	(Netherlands) Kampong
4	FW	Freeke Moes	29 November 1998 (aged 25)	62	21	(Netherlands) Amsterdam
5	DF	Lisa Post	27 January 1999 (aged 25)	44	0	(Netherlands) SCHC
7	MF	Xan de Waard (Captain)	8 November 1995 (aged 28)	209	20	(Netherlands) SCHC
8	MF	Yibbi Jansen	18 November 1999 (aged 24)	73	60	(Netherlands) SCHC
9	DF	Renée van Laarhoven	15 October 1997 (aged 26)	62	3	(Netherlands) SCHC
10	MF	Felice Albers	27 December 1999 (aged 24)	66	26	(Netherlands) Amsterdam
11	MF	Maria Verschoor	22 April 1994 (aged 30)	205	29	(Netherlands) Amsterdam
14	DF	Sanne Koolen	23 March 1996 (aged 28)	111	1	(Netherlands) Den Bosch
15	FW	Frédérique Matla	28 December 1996 (aged 27)	130	94	(Netherlands) Den Bosch
16	FW	Joosje Burg	29 July 1997 (aged 26)	42	22	(Netherlands) Den Bosch
17	DF	Marleen Jochems	24 January 2000 (aged 24)	21	0	(Netherlands) Hurley
18	DF	Pien Sanders	11 June 1998 (aged 26)	123	6	(Netherlands) Den Bosch
19	FW	Marijn Veen	18 November 1996 (aged 27)	48	23	(Netherlands) Amsterdam
20	MF	Laura Nunnink	26 January 1995 (aged 29)	188	2	(Netherlands) Den Bosch

Reserves:

- Pien Dicke
- Rosa Fernig
- Josine Koning (GK)

== Group B ==
=== Argentina ===
The squad was announced on 14 June 2024.

Head coach: Fernando Ferrara

No.	Pos.	Player	Date of birth (age)	Caps	Goals	Club
2	MF	Sofía Toccalino	20 March 1997 (aged 27)	168	12	(Argentina) St. Catherine's
3	DF	Agustina Gorzelany	11 March 1996 (aged 28)	116	70	(Argentina) San Martín
4	DF	Valentina Raposo	28 January 2003 (aged 21)	51	8	(Argentina) River Plate
5	MF	Agostina Alonso	1 October 1995 (aged 28)	157	7	(Argentina) Banco Nación
7	FW	Agustina Albertario	1 January 1993 (aged 31)	227	62	(Argentina) Lomas
10	FW	María Granatto	21 April 1995 (aged 29)	205	104	(Argentina) Santa Bárbara
13	GK	Cristina Cosentino	22 December 1997 (aged 26)	40	0	(Argentina) Banco Nación
17	MF	Rocío Sánchez Moccia (Captain)	2 August 1988 (aged 35)	320	20	(Argentina) Puerto Nizuc
18	MF	Victoria Sauze	21 July 1991 (aged 33)	147	4	(Argentina) River Plate
20	MF	Sofía Cairó	8 October 2002 (aged 21)	27	4	(Argentina) Mariano Moreno
22	FW	Eugenia Trinchinetti	17 July 1997 (aged 27)	179	38	(Argentina) San Fernando
23	FW	Lara Casas	22 June 2004 (aged 20)	9	1	(Argentina) Italiano
25	DF	Juana Castellaro	29 March 2005 (aged 19)	21	0	(Argentina) River Plate
26	MF	Pilar Campoy	6 October 1990 (aged 33)	96	24	(Argentina) Hacoaj
28	FW	Julieta Jankunas	20 January 1999 (aged 25)	170	65	(Argentina) Universitario de Córdoba
33	FW	Zoe Díaz	5 June 2006 (aged 18)	6	0	(Argentina) Italiano

Reserves:

- Clara Barberi (GK)
- Valentina Marcucci
- Victoria Miranda

=== Australia ===
The squad was announced on 1 July 2024.

Head coach: Katrina Powell

No.	Pos.	Player	Date of birth (age)	Caps	Goals	Club
1	DF	Claire Colwill	19 September 2003 (aged 20)	56	5	(Australia) Brisbane Blaze
3	MF	Brooke Peris	16 January 1993 (aged 31)	208	40	(Australia) Adelaide Fire
4	MF	Amy Lawton	19 January 2002 (aged 22)	79	4	(Netherlands) Hurley
5	MF	Grace Young	23 August 2002 (aged 21)	34	0	(Australia) NSW Pride
6	DF	Penny Squibb	9 February 1993 (aged 31)	56	6	(Australia) Perth Thundersticks
8	MF	Maddison Brooks	23 September 2004 (aged 19)	32	6	(Australia) OHA
11	FW	Alice Arnott	25 February 1998 (aged 26)	22		
13	DF	Hattie Shand	11 January 2000 (aged 24)	52		
14	MF	Stephanie Kershaw	19 April 1995 (aged 29)	120	21	(Australia) Brisbane Blaze
15	MF	Kaitlin Nobbs (captain)	24 September 1997 (aged 26)	135	10	(Australia) NSW Pride
18	MF	Jane Claxton (captain)	26 October 1992 (aged 31)	246	21	(Australia) Adelaide Fire
19	GK	Jocelyn Bartram	4 May 1993 (aged 31)	107	0	(Australia) NSW Pride
20	DF	Karri Somerville	7 April 1999 (aged 25)	53	0	(Australia) Perth Thundersticks
21	MF	Renee Taylor	28 September 1996 (aged 27)	132	15	(Australia) Brisbane Blaze
22	DF	Tatum Stewart	22 February 2002 (aged 22)	30	6	(Australia) Brisbane Blaze
24	MF	Mariah Williams	31 May 1995 (aged 29)	132	20	(Australia) NSW Pride
29	MF	Rebecca Greiner	13 June 1999 (aged 25)	74	9	(Australia) Brisbane Blaze
30	FW	Grace Stewart (captain)	28 April 1997 (aged 27)	124	36	(Australia) NSW Pride

Reserves:

- Aleisha Power (GK)

=== Great Britain ===
The squad was announced on 18 June 2024.

Head coach: (Scotland) David Ralph

No.	Pos.	Player	Date of birth (age)	Caps	Goals	Club
4	MF	(England) Laura Roper	8 March 1988 (aged 36)	350	22	(England) East Grinstead
6	DF	(England) Anna Toman	29 April 1993 (aged 31)	139	14	(England) Wimbledon
7	FW	(England) Hannah French	30 December 1994 (aged 29)	144	55	(England) Surbiton
8	FW	(Wales) Sarah Jones	25 June 1990 (aged 34)	178	30	(England) Wimbledon
9	DF	(Scotland) Amy Costello	14 January 1998 (aged 26)	134	19	(England) Surbiton
10	FW	(Scotland) Sarah Robertson	27 September 1993 (aged 30)	207	26	(England) Hampstead & Westminster
12	FW	(Scotland) Charlotte Watson	23 April 1998 (aged 26)	115	33	(England) Loughborough Students
14	FW	(England) Tessa Howard	6 January 1999 (aged 25)	91	35	(England) East Grinstead
16	MF	(England) Isabelle Petter	27 June 2000 (aged 24)	105	15	(England) Surbiton
18	DF	(England) Giselle Ansley	31 March 1992 (aged 32)	221	59	(England) Surbiton
20	DF	(England) Hollie Pearne-Webb (Captain)	19 September 1990 (aged 33)	264	20	(England) Wimbledon
21	MF	(England) Fiona Crackles	11 February 2000 (aged 24)	87	3	(England) Wimbledon
23	MF	(England) Sophie Hamilton	28 February 2001 (aged 23)	71	7	(England) Surbiton
26	MF	(England) Lily Owsley	10 December 1994 (aged 29)	235	79	(England) Hampstead & Westminster
28	MF	(England) Flora Peel	19 September 1996 (aged 27)	56	1	(England) Wimbledon
40	GK	(England) Miriam Pritchard	21 December 1998 (aged 25)	13	0	(England) Holcombe

Reserves:

- Grace Balsdon
- Jessica Buchanan
- Lily Walker

=== South Africa ===
The squad was announced on 19 June 2024.

Head coach: Giles Bonnet

No.	Pos.	Player	Date of birth (age)	Caps	Goals	Club
1	GK	Anelle Lloyd	6 December 1993 (aged 30)	48	0	(South Africa) Mpumalanga
3	FW	Celia Seerane	18 June 1990 (aged 34)	185	48	(South Africa) Tuks
4	DF	Stephanie Botha	30 December 1998 (aged 25)	30	2	(South Africa) Somerset West
5	MF	Edith Molikoe	23 May 2000 (aged 24)	34	0	(South Africa) Tuks
8	FW	Kristen Paton	21 December 1996 (aged 27)	72	8	(Netherlands) HGC
10	MF	Onthatile Zulu	14 March 2000 (aged 24)	56	0	(South Africa) WPCC beavers
12	FW	Dirkie Chamberlain	3 November 1986 (aged 37)	243	130	(South Africa) North West
13	DF	Paris-Gail Isaacs	25 August 2006 (aged 17)	7	1	(South Africa) Beaulieu
14	MF	Taheera Augousti	23 September 2005 (aged 18)	26	2	(South Africa) Central
16	DF	Erin Christie (Captain)	20 March 1992 (aged 32)	105	9	(South Africa) WPCC beavers
17	FW	Ntsopa Mokoena	17 August 2004 (aged 19)	26	7	(South Africa) Central Samurais
18	DF	Hannah Pearce	17 November 1998 (aged 25)	41	0	(England) Birmingham
21	FW	Ongeziwe Mali	21 May 1999 (aged 25)	30	3	(South Africa) Maties
25	DF	Marié Louw	9 February 1996 (aged 28)	26	3	(South Africa) Bohemian
27	FW	Kayla de Waal	11 June 2000 (aged 24)	20	2	(South Africa) WPCC beavers
28	FW	Quanita Bobbs (Captain)	3 September 1993 (aged 30)	184	37	(South Africa) Central
30	MF	Kayla Swarts	24 May 2003 (aged 21)	24	0	(South Africa) Central

Reserves:

- Aphiwe Dimba (GK)

=== Spain ===
The squad was announced on 29 June 2024.

Head coach: Carlos García Cuenca

No.	Pos.	Player	Date of birth (age)	Caps	Goals	Club
2	DF	Laura Barrios	4 September 2000 (aged 23)	54	6	(Spain) RC Polo
4	FW	Sara Barrios	4 September 2000 (aged 23)	42	7	(Spain) RC Polo
7	MF	Júlia Strappato	16 January 2000 (aged 24)	41	0	(Spain) Club de Campo
8	MF	Lucía Jiménez	8 January 1997 (aged 27)	179	23	(Germany) Mannheim
9	DF	María López (Captain)	16 February 1990 (aged 34)	249	43	(Spain) Club de Campo
10	FW	Belén Iglesias	6 July 1996 (aged 28)	105	23	(Spain) Club de Campo
11	FW	Marta Segú	22 June 1995 (aged 29)	115	37	(Spain) RC Polo
13	DF	Constanza Amundson	12 February 1998 (aged 26)	41	1	(Spain) RC Polo
14	FW	Blanca Pérez	17 September 2003 (aged 20)	10	0	(Spain) Club de Campo
17	DF	Lola Riera	25 June 1991 (aged 33)	205	146	(Spain) Sanse Complutense
19	FW	Begoña García	19 July 1995 (aged 29)	173	42	(Spain) Club de Campo
20	DF	Xantal Giné	23 September 1992 (aged 31)	202	15	(Spain) RC Polo
21	MF	Beatriz Pérez	4 May 1991 (aged 33)	261	53	(Spain) Club de Campo
24	MF	Alejandra Torres-Quevedo	30 September 1999 (aged 24)	93	7	(Spain) Club de Campo
26	GK	Clara Pérez	26 July 2001 (aged 23)	25	0	(Spain) Atlètic Terrassa
30	FW	Patricia Álvarez	4 March 1998 (aged 26)	39	7	(Spain) RC Polo

Reserves:

- Clara Badia
- María Tello (GK)
- Laia Vidosa

=== United States ===
The squad was announced on 12 June 2024.

Head coach: (Republic of Ireland) David Passmore

No.	Pos.	Player	Date of birth (age)	Caps	Goals	Club
1	FW	Abigail Tamer	9 July 2003 (aged 21)	31	10	(United States) Pinnacle
2	MF	Meredith Sholder	27 February 1999 (aged 25)	49	2	(United States) Firestyx
3	FW	Ashley Sessa	23 June 2004 (aged 20)	50	13	(United States) WC Eagles
6	FW	Megan Valzonis	5 March 1999 (aged 25)	35	4	(United States) RUSH Field Hockey
8	MF	Brooke DeBerdine	19 May 1999 (aged 25)	50	1	(United States) Nook Hockey
9	DF	Madeleine Zimmer	28 September 2001 (aged 22)	53	2	(United States) Alley Cats
12	MF	Amanda Golini (Captain)	28 March 1995 (aged 29)	154	14	(United States) Rapid Fire Elite
13	DF	Ashley Hoffman (Captain)	8 November 1996 (aged 27)	123	26	(United States) X–Calibur
17	FW	Elizabeth Yeager	17 June 2003 (aged 21)	53	11	(United States) WC Eagles
20	DF	Leah Crouse	22 February 2000 (aged 24)	48	3	(United States) TCOYO
21	DF	Alexandra Hammel	16 June 1996 (aged 28)	69	1	(United States) HTC Field Hockey
23	FW	Sophia Gladieux	14 June 2002 (aged 22)	5	1	(United States) X–Calibur
24	DF	Kelee Lepage	4 October 1997 (aged 26)	42	0	(United States) X–Calibur
25	MF	Karlie Kisha	25 September 1995 (aged 28)	68	1	(United States) Highstyx
27	MF	Emma DeBerdine	14 June 2001 (aged 23)	44	0	(United States) Nook Hockey
31	GK	Kelsey Bing	14 June 2001 (aged 23)	86	0	(United States) Texas Pride

Reserves:

- Sanne Caarls
- Jennifer Rizzo (GK)
- Jacqueline Sumfest
