= 2024–25 Women's FIH Hockey Nations Cup =

International field hockey tournament

Tournament details
- Host country: Chile
- City: Santiago
- Dates: 23 February–2 March
- Teams: 8 (from 4 confederations)
- Venue: Centro Deportivo de Hockey Césped Estadio Nacional

Final positions
- Champions: New Zealand (1st title)
- Runner-up: Ireland
- Third place: Chile

Tournament statistics
- Matches played: 20
- Goals scored: 66 (3.3 per match)
- Top scorer: (South Korea) Jeong Da-bin (4 goals)
- Best player: (New Zealand) Holly Pearson
- Best young player: (Ireland) Mikayla Power
- Best goalkeeper: (Chile) Natalia Salvador

The 2024–25 Women's FIH Hockey Nations Cup was the third edition of the Women's FIH Hockey Nations Cup, the annual qualification tournament for the FIH Pro League and relegation for the FIH Hockey Nations Cup 2 organised by the International Hockey Federation. The tournament was held in Santiago, Chile from 23 February to 2 March 2025.

New Zealand won their first tile with a finals win over Ireland.

== Teams ==
The eight highest ranked teams not participating in the 2024–25 Women's FIH Pro League participate in the tournament.

Canada

Head Coach: (South Africa) Sheldon Rostron

1. Thora Rae
2. Brooke McCusker
3. Anna Mollenhauer
4. Elise Wong
5. Kathleen Leahy
6. Kenzie Girgis
7. Sara Goodman
8. Karli Johansen (C)
9. Natalie Sourisseau (C)
10. Alexis de Armond
11. Audrey Sawers
12. Julia Ross
13. Nora Goddard-Despot
14. Danielle Husar
15. Allison Kuzyk
16. Mikayla Stelling
17. Rowan Harris (GK)
18. Marcia LaPlante (GK)
Chile

Head Coach: Cristóbal Rodríguez

1. Fernanda Villagrán
2. Doménica Ananías
3. Denise Rojas
4. Fernanda Flores
5. Sofía Filipek
6. Fernanda Arrieta
7. Manuela Urroz (C)
8. Beatriz Wirth (GK)
9. Francisca Tala
10. Constanza Palma
11. Laura Müller
12. Agustina Solano
13. Francisca Irazoqui
14. Paula Valdivia
15. María Maldonado
16. Natalia Salvador (GK)
17. Constanza Muñoz
18. Josefina Gutiérrez
Ireland

Head Coach: Gareth Grundie

1. Ayeisha McFerran (GK)
2. Elizabeth Murphy (GK)
3. Sarah McAuley
4. Michelle Carey
5. Róisín Upton
6. Niamh Carey
7. Sarah Hawkshaw (C)
8. Kathryn Mullan
9. Hannah McLoughlin
10. Sarah Torrans
11. Elena Neill
12. Naomi Carroll
13. Ellen Curran
14. Caoimhe Perdue
15. Charlotte Beggs
16. Christina Hamill
17. Mikayla Power
18. Emily Kealy
Japan

Head Coach: Kazuyuki Ozawa

1. Maho Ueno
2. Miyu Suzuki
3. Mayuri Horikawa
4. Mei Matsunami
5. Nanako Tateiwa
6. Haruka Kawaguchi
7. Hanami Saito
8. Nanami Kaneko
9. Mai Toriyama
10. Ai Hiramitsu
11. Amiru Shimada (C)
12. Akio Tanaka (GK)
13. Rui Takashima
14. Junon Kawai
15. Ikumi Matsu
16. Ku Yudo (GK)
17. Miyu Hasegawa
18. Hiroka Murayama
New Zealand

Head Coach: Phillip Burrows

1. Olivia Shannon (C)
2. Hannah Cotter
3. Emelia Surridge
4. Brooke Roberts (GK)
5. Casey Crowley
6. Grace O'Hanlon (GK)
7. Stephanie Dickins
8. Anna Crowley
9. Paige Blake
10. Kaitlin Cotter
11. Holly Pearson
12. Hannah Gravenall
13. Riana Pho
14. Anna Willocks
15. Emma Findlay
16. Brittany Wang
17. Rebecca Baker
18. Emma Rainey
Scotland

Head Coach: Chris Duncan

1. Jennifer Eadie
2. Amber Murray (GK)
3. Eve Pearson
4. Amy Costello (C)
5. Katie Birch
6. Charlotte Watson
7. Ruth Blaikie
8. Heather McEwan
9. Frances Longeran
10. Sarah Jamieson (C)
11. Millie Steiger (C)
12. Bronwyn Shields
13. Jessica Ross
14. Jessica Buchanan (GK)
15. Rebecca Birch
16. Fiona Burnet
17. Ellie Mackenzie
18. Ava Findlay
South Korea

Head Coach: Kim Yoon

1. Kim Eun-ji (b. 2000) (GK)
2. Jung Che-young
3. Oh You-min
4. Lee Yu-jin
5. An Su-jin
6. Kang Ji-na
7. Cheon Eun-bi (C)
8. Cho Hye-jin
9. Kim Eun-ji (b. 1999)
10. Jin Su-yeon
11. Lee Yu-ri
12. Park Seung-ae
13. Kim Jeong-ihn
14. Choi Ji-yun
15. Jeong Da-bin
16. Jung Sung-hee
17. Kim Min-jeong
18. Lee Seo-yeon (GK)
United States

Head Coach: (Republic of Ireland) David Passmore

1. Meredith Sholder
2. Sophia Gladieux
3. Madeleine Zimmer
4. Reese D'Ariano
5. Katie Dixon
6. Amanda Golini (C)
7. Sanne Caarls
8. Emma DeBerdine
9. Josie Hollamon
10. Leah Crouse
11. Alexandra Hammel (C)
12. Jacqueline Sumfest
13. Kelee Lepage
14. Lucy Adams
15. Kealsie Reeb (GK)
16. Jennifer Rizzo (GK)
17. Mia Schoenbeck
18. Jans Croon

== Preliminary round ==
=== Pool A ===
Pos	Team	Pld	W	D	L	GF	GA	GD	Pts	Qualification
1	Chile (H)	3	2	1	0	8	1	+7	7	Semi-finals
2	United States	3	2	0	1	7	5	+2	6	Semi-finals
3	Japan	3	1	1	1	4	5	−1	4	
4	Canada	3	0	0	3	1	9	−8	0	

Source: FIH
Rules for classification: 1) points; 2) matches won; 3) goal difference; 4) goals for; 5) head-to-head result; 6) field goals scored.
(H) Hosts

23 February 2025
19:00

Japan	0–0	Chile
	Report

Umpires:
Allison Mikelson (USA)
Steven Bakker (NED)

23 February 2025
21:00

United States	2–0	Canada
DeBerdine 15'; Sholder 28'	Report

Umpires:
Kim Yoon-seon (KOR)
Federico Silva (ARG)

25 February 2025
19:00

Chile	5–0	Canada
Valdivia 22'; Arrieta 40'; Urroz 47'; Müller 56'; Villagrán 60+'	Report

Umpires:
Federico Silva (ARG)
Cassidy Gallagher (AUS)

26 February 2025
11:00

United States	4–2	Japan
Dixon 7'; Lepage 15'; Zimmer 44'; Schoenbeck 53'	Report	Toriyama 12'; Saito 54'

Umpires:
Kim Yoon-seon (KOR)
Megan Robertson (CAN)

27 February 2025
19:00

Chile	3–1	United States
Rojas 25'; Urroz 38'; Maldonado 53'	Report	Zimmer 57'

Umpires:
Victoria Pazos (POR)
Lani Nichol (NZL)

27 February 2025
21:00

Japan	2–1	Canada
Suzuki 33'; Murayama 47'	Report	Leahy 35'

Umpires:
Kim Yoon-seon (KOR)
Steven Bakker (NED)

=== Pool B ===
Pos	Team	Pld	W	D	L	GF	GA	GD	Pts	Qualification
1	Ireland	3	3	0	0	6	0	+6	9	Semi-finals
2	New Zealand	3	2	0	1	8	6	+2	6	Semi-finals
3	Scotland	3	1	0	2	3	6	−3	3	
4	South Korea	3	0	0	3	4	9	−5	0	

Source: FIH
Rules for classification: 1) points; 2) matches won; 3) goal difference; 4) goals for; 5) head-to-head result; 6) field goals scored.

23 February 2025
15:00

New Zealand	5–4	South Korea
Willocks 9'; Rainey 28'; Pearson 42', 58'; Pho 55'	Report	Park 6'; Jeong 19', 27'; Cheon 40'

Umpires:
Zoe Hall (ENG)
Megan Robertson (CAN)

23 February 2025
17:00

Ireland	3–0	Scotland
Power 6'; N. Carey 30'; Mullan 58'	Report

Umpires:
Cassidy Gallagher (AUS)
Lani Nichol (NZL)

25 February 2025
15:00

South Korea	0–2	Scotland
	Report	Jamieson 21'; Burnet 43'

Umpires:
Victoria Pazos (POR)
Steven Bakker (NED)

25 February 2025
17:00

Ireland	1–0	New Zealand
Carroll 30'	Report

Umpires:
Melissa Taylor (RSA)
Allison Mikelson (USA)

27 February 2025
15:00

New Zealand	3–1	Scotland
K. Cotter 25'; Shannon 54'; Findlay 59'	Report	Watson 2'

Umpires:
Cassidy Gallagher (AUS)
Melissa Taylor (RSA)

27 February 2025
17:00

South Korea	0–2	Ireland
	Report	Torrans 25'; Power 51'

Umpires:
Allison Mikelson (USA)
Federico Silva (ARG)

== Classification round ==
=== Bracket ===
Crossovers
1 March
Japan	5
South Korea	4
1 March
Scotland	2
Canada	0

Fifth place
2 March
Japan	0
Scotland	2
Seventh place
2 March
South Korea	2
Canada	0

=== Crossovers ===
1 March 2025
11:00

Japan	5–4	South Korea
Takashima 12', 57'; Toriyama 40'; Hasegawa 42'; Murayama 55'	Report	Cho 5'; Jung S. 8'; Jeong 16'; Kim J. 41'

Umpires:
Megan Robertson (CAN)
Lani Nichol (NZL)

1 March 2025
13:30

Scotland	2–0	Canada
Jamieson 34'; Mackenzie 41'	Report

Umpires:
Victoria Pazos (POR)
Melissa Taylor (RSA)

=== Seventh and eighth place ===
2 March 2025
11:00

South Korea	2–0	Canada
Jeong 29'; Park 34'	Report

Umpires:
Steven Bakker (NED)
Melissa Taylor (RSA)

=== Fifth and sixth place ===
2 March 2025
13:30

Japan	0–2	Scotland
	Report	Costello 47'; Burnet 52'

Umpires:
Victoria Pazos (POR)
Federico Silva (ARG)

== First to fourth place classification ==
=== Bracket ===
Semi-finals
1 March
Chile	1 (1)
New Zealand (pen.)	1 (3)
1 March
Ireland	2
United States	1

Final
2 March
New Zealand (pen.)	1 (4)
Ireland	1 (2)
Third place
2 March
Chile	2
United States	1

=== Semifinals ===
1 March 2025
16:00

Ireland	2–1	United States
Upton 24'; Mullan 44'	Report	Zimmer 4'

Umpires:
Cassidy Gallagher (AUS)
Steven Bakker (NED)

1 March 2025
18:30

Chile	1–1	New Zealand
Villagrán 9'	Report	Willocks 8'
Penalties
Tala (penalty shoot-out missed); Ananías (penalty shoot-out missed); Gutiérrez (penalty shoot-out scored); Irazoqui (penalty shoot-out missed)	1–3	(penalty shoot-out missed) Willocks; (penalty shoot-out scored) Shannon; (penalty shoot-out scored) Pearson; (penalty shoot-out scored) Dickins

Umpires:
Kim Yoon-seon (KOR)
Allison Mikelson (USA)

=== Third place game ===
2 March 2025
16:00

Chile	2–1	United States
Maldonado 27'; Arrieta 54'	Report	Caarls 51'

Umpires:
Megan Robertson (CAN)
Cassidy Gallagher (AUS)

=== Final ===
2 March 2025
18:30

New Zealand	1–1	Ireland
Surridge 6'	Report	Mullan 57'
Penalties
Willocks (penalty shoot-out scored); Shannon (penalty shoot-out scored); Pearson (penalty shoot-out missed); Dickins (penalty shoot-out scored); H. Cotter (penalty shoot-out scored)	4–2	(penalty shoot-out missed) N. Carey; (penalty shoot-out scored) Power; (penalty shoot-out scored) Hawkshaw; (penalty shoot-out missed) M. Carey

Umpires:
Kim Yoon-seon (KOR)
Allison Mikelson (USA)'

== Statistics ==
=== Final standings ===
Pos	Team	Promotion or relegation
1	New Zealand	Promoted to the 2025–26 Women's FIH Pro League
2	Ireland	
3	Chile (H)	
4	United States	
5	Scotland	
6	Japan	
7	South Korea	
8	Canada	Relegated to 2025–26 FIH Nations Cup 2

Source: FIH
(H) Host

== Awards ==
The following individual awards were presented at the conclusion of the tournament on 2 March 2025.

Award	Recipient
Player of the Tournament	(New Zealand) Holly Pearson
Goalkeeper of the Tournament	(Chile) Natalia Salvador
Top Goalscorer	(South Korea) Jeong Da-bin
Best Junior Player	(Ireland) Mikayla Power

== Goalscorers ==
There were 66 goals scored in 20 matches, for an average of 3.3 goals per match.

4 goals

- (South Korea) Jeong Da-bin

3 goals

- (Ireland) Kathryn Mullan
- (United States) Madeleine Zimmer

2 goals

- (Chile) Fernanda Arrieta
- (Chile) María Maldonado
- (Chile) Manuela Urroz
- (Chile) Fernanda Villagrán
- (Ireland) Mikayla Power
- (Japan) Hiroka Murayama
- (Japan) Rui Takashima
- (Japan) Mai Toriyama
- (New Zealand) Holly Pearson
- (New Zealand) Anna Willocks
- (Scotland) Fiona Burnet
- (Scotland) Sarah Jamieson
- (South Korea) Park Seung-ae

1 goal

- (Canada) Kathleen Leahy
- (Chile) Laura Müller
- (Chile) Denise Rojas
- (Chile) Paula Valdivia
- (Ireland) Niamh Carey
- (Ireland) Naomi Carroll
- (Ireland) Sarah Torrans
- (Ireland) Róisín Upton
- (Japan) Miyu Hasegawa
- (Japan) Hanami Saito
- (Japan) Miyu Suzuki
- (New Zealand) Kaitlin Cotter
- (New Zealand) Emma Findlay
- (New Zealand) Riana Pho
- (New Zealand) Emma Rainey
- (New Zealand) Olivia Shannon
- (New Zealand) Emelia Surridge
- (Scotland) Amy Costello
- (Scotland) Ellie Mackenzie
- (Scotland) Charlotte Watson
- (South Korea) Cheon Eun-bi
- (South Korea) Cho Hye-jin
- (South Korea) Jung Sung-hee
- (South Korea) Kim Jeong-ihn
- (United States) Sanne Caarls
- (United States) Emma DeBerdine
- (United States) Katie Dixon
- (United States) Kelee Lepage
- (United States) Mia Schoenbeck
- (United States) Meredith Sholder

Source: FIH

== See also ==
- 2024–25 Men's FIH Hockey Nations Cup
- 2024–25 Women's FIH Hockey Nations Cup 2
