= 2024 Women's FIH Hockey Olympic Qualifiers squads =

This article lists the confirmed squads for the 2024 Women's FIH Hockey Olympic Qualifiers tournament, held in Ranchi, India and Valencia, Spain between 13 and 20 January 2024. The sixteen national teams were required to register a playing squad of eighteen players and two reserves.

== Tournament 1 ==
=== Chile ===
Head coach: (Argentina) Sergio Vigil

3. Fernanda Villagrán
4. Doménica Ananías
5. Denise Rojas
6. Fernanda Flores
10. Manuela Urroz
13. Camila Caram (C)
14. Francisca Tala
15. Fernanda Arrieta
16. Constanza Palma
17. Consuelo de las Heras
18. Valentina Cerda (GK)
19. Agustina Solano
22. Paula Valdivia
25. María Maldonado
28. Natalia Salvador (GK)
29. Simone Avelli
30. Josefina Khamis
36. Antonia Morales

=== Czech Republic ===
Head coach: (Republic of Ireland) Gareth Grundie

1. Anna Linková (GK)
2. Kateřina Laciná (C)
4. Kateřina Bašová
5. Lucie Duchková
8. Kamila Kopecká
10. Kateřina Topinková
13. Adéla Lehovcová
14. Zuzana Smerádová
15. Anna Kolářová
17. Linda Nedvĕdová
18. Anna Vorlová
19. Nikol Babická
20. Nela Tlamsová
21. Natálie Nováková
24. Natálie Hájková
27. Barbora Čecháková (GK)
28. Eliška Fousková
66. Veronika Decsoyová

=== Germany ===
Head coach: Valentin Altenburg

Germany announced their final squad on 22 December 2023.

2. Kira Horn
4. Nike Lorenz (C)
5. Selin Oruz
6. Benedetta Wenzel
8. Anne Schröder
10. Lisa Nolte
11. Lena Micheel
12. Charlotte Stapenhorst
15. Nathalie Kubalski (GK)
16. Sonja Zimmermann (C)
17. Pauline Heinz
20. Julia Sonntag (GK)
22. Cécile Pieper
23. Emma Davidsmeyer
25. Viktoria Huse
28. Jette Fleschütz
30. Hanna Granitzki
31. Linnea Weidemann

=== India ===
Head coach: (Netherlands) Janneke Schopman

India announced their final squad on 30 December 2023.

4. Monika Malik
5. Sonika Tandi
8. Nikki Pradhan
9. Bichu Devi Kharibam (GK)
11. Savita Punia (C, GK)
14. Sangita Kumari
15. Nisha Warsi
16. Vandana Katariya
18. Udita Duhan
19. Vaishnavi Phalke
20. Lalremsiami
24. Jyoti Rumawat
25. Navneet Kaur
30. Salima Tete
32. Neha Goyal
50. Ishika Chaudhary
52. Beauty Dungdung
55. Deepika Kumari

=== Italy ===
Head coach: (Argentina) Andrés Mondo

Italy announced their final squad on 22 December 2023.

3. Teresa Dalla Vittoria
5. Ailin Oviedo
7. Elettra Bormida
9. Emilia Munitis
11. Antonella Rinaldi
12. Lucía Inés Caruso (GK)
14. Antonella Bruni
18. Federica Carta (C)
21. Sara Puglisi (C)
25. Mercedes Pastor
26. Sofía Laurito
27. Lara Oviedo
28. Ivanna Pessina
30. Camila Machín
32. Augustina D'Ascola (GK)
33. Guadalupe Moras
34. Maria Inaudi
35. Maria Aleman

=== Japan ===
Head coach: (India) Jude Menezes

Japan announced their final squad on 26 December 2023.

1. Eika Nakamura (GK)
5. Yu Asai
7. Miyu Suzuki
9. Yuri Nagai (C)
10. Hazuki Nagai
11. Shihori Oikawa
13. Miki Kozuka
15. Chiko Fujibayashi
16. Akari Nakagomi
17. Shiho Kobayakawa
21. Mai Toriyama
25. Kana Urata
26. Amiru Shimada
27. Akio Tanaka (GK)
29. Sakurako Omoto
33. Aimi Kobayashi
36. Miyu Hasegawa
37. Rika Ogawa

=== New Zealand ===
Head coach: Phil Burrows

New Zealand announced their final squad on 21 December 2023.

1. Tarryn Davey
2. Olivia Shannon
4. Olivia Merry (C)
5. Frances Davies
6. Hope Ralph
8. Hannah Cotter
10. Brooke Roberts (GK)
11. Casey Crowley
13. Samantha Child
15. Grace O'Hanlon (GK)
16. Elizabeth Thompson
17. Stephanie Dickins
20. Megan Hull (C)
21. Alia Jaques
22. Katie Doar
28. Hannah Gravenall
32. Rose Tynan
33. Julia King

=== United States ===
Head coach: (Republic of Ireland) David Passmore

The United States announced their final squad on 21 December 2023.

1. Abigail Tamer
3. Ashley Sessa
4. Danielle Grega
7. Jillian Wolgemuth
8. Brooke DeBerdine
9. Madeleine Zimmer
12. Amanda Golini (C)
13. Ashley Hoffman
17. Elizabeth Yeager
20. Leah Crouse
21. Alexandra Hammel
24. Kelee LePage
25. Karlie Kisha
27. Emma DeBerdine
31. Kelsey Bing (GK)
32. Jennifer Rizzo (GK)
35. Sanne Caarls
36. Meredith Sholder

== Tournament 2 ==
=== Belgium ===
Head coach: (Netherlands) Raoul Ehren

Belgium announced their final squad on 23 December 2023.

3. Justine Rasir
4. Delphine Marien
5. Abigail Raye
6. Charlotte Englebert
7. Judith Vandermeiren
8. Emma Puvrez
10. Louise Versavel
13. Alix Gerniers (C)
15. Vanessa Blockmans
17. Michelle Struijk (C)
19. Barbara Nelen (C)
21. Aisling D'Hooghe (GK)
22. Stéphanie Vanden Borre
26. Lien Hillewaert
29. Elodie Picard (GK)
30. Ambre Ballenghien
36. Hélène Brasseur
40. Camille Belis

=== Canada ===
Head coach: (England) Daniel Kerry

Canada announced their final squad on 18 December 2023.

2. Chloe Walton
3. Thora Rae
4. Melanie Scholz
6. Jordyn Faiczak
7. Anna Mollenhauer
8. Elise Wong
9. Madison Thompson
10. Kathleen Leahy
11. Kenzie Girgis
12. Sara Goodman
14. Karli Johansen
15. Grace Delmotte
16. Natalie Sourisseau (C)
17. Sara McManus
19. Audrey Sawers
22. Danielle Husar
31. Rowan Harris (GK)
34. Marcia LaPlante (GK)

=== Great Britain ===
Head coach: David Ralph

4. Laura Roper
6. Anna Toman
7. Hannah French
8. Sarah Jones
9. Amy Costello
10. Sarah Robertson
13. Elena Rayer
14. Tessa Howard
16. Isabelle Petter
17. Katie Robertson
18. Giselle Ansley
20. Hollie Pearne-Webb (C)
21. Fiona Crackles
23. Sophie Hamilton
25. Sabbie Heesh (GK)
26. Lily Owsley
40. Miriam Pritchard (GK)
41. Lily Walker

=== Ireland ===
Head coach: (Australia) Sean Dancer

Ireland announced their final squad on 29 December 2023.

1. Ayeisha McFerran (GK)
2. Elizabeth Murphy (GK)
3. Sarah McAuley
5. Michelle Carey
6. Róisín Upton
7. Niamh Carey
8. Sarah Hawkshaw
9. Kathryn Mullan (C)
10. Hannah McLoughlin
11. Sarah Torrans
12. Elena Neill
13. Naomi Carroll
14. Ellen Curran
16. Charlotte Beggs
20. Chloe Watkins
21. Katie McKee
28. Deirdre Duke
31. Bethany Barr

=== Malaysia ===
Head coach: Nasihin Ibrahim

1. Siti Nasir (GK)
4. Siti Mohd
5. Dayang Abang
6. Norsharina Shabuddin
7. Azmyra Azhairy
8. Juliani Din (C)
10. Siti Mohd
11. Nur Azhar
17. Anith Humaira Baharudin
18. Nur Mohammed
19. Insyirah Effarizal
21. Fatin Sukri
24. Nurul Azman
26. Nuramirah Zulkifli
27. Nurmaizatul Syafi
29. Kirandeep Gurdip
32. Nur Zainal (GK)
33. Nur Yussaini

=== South Korea ===
Head coach: Han Jin-soo

1. Kim Eun-ji (GK)
5. Lee Yu-jin
6. Kim Hyo-bi
7. Seo Jung-eun
8. An Hyo-ju
9. Kang Ji-na
10. Cheon Eun-bi (C)
11. Cho Hye-jin
12. Kim Min-jeong
13. Cho Eun-ji
14. Lee Yu-ri
15. Park Seung-ae
16. Kim Jeong-ihn
17. Seo Su-young
20. Kim Eun-ji
22. An Su-jin
31. Lee Seo-yeon (GK)
32. Kwon So-yeong

=== Spain ===
Head coach: Carlos García Cuenca

Spain announced their final squad on 30 December 2023.

2. Laura Barrios
4. Sara Barrios
7. Júlia Strappato
8. Lucía Jiménez
9. María López
10. Belén Iglesias
11. Marta Segú
13. Constanza Amundson
14. Blanca Pérez
17. Lola Riera
19. Begoña García
20. Xantal Giné (C)
21. Beatriz Pérez
22. Laia Vidosa
24. Alejandra Torres-Quevedo
26. Clara Pérez (GK)
30. Patricia Álvarez
31. María Tello (GK)

=== Ukraine ===
Head coach: Svitlana Makaieva

2. Marharyta Mykhailiuk
4. Maryna Khilko
5. Yevheniia Moroz
6. Yevheniya Kernoz
8. Kateryna Shokalenko
9. Valeriia Rudychenko
10. Karyna Leonova
14. Valeriia Tyshchenko
15. Veronika Movchan
16. Alina Fadieieva (GK)
17. Veronika Korobkina
18. Anastasiia Voievoda
19. Valeriia Zaitseva
21. Anastasiia Shyshyna
23. Kateryna Popova
25. Anna Tanchenko
27. Tetiana Stepachenko (GK)
31. Yana Vorushylo (C)
