= Jung Da-bin =

Jung Da-bin may refer to:

- Jeong Da-bin (actress, born 1980)
- Jung Da-bin (actress, born 2000)
- Jeong Da-bin (field hockey)
