= Nina Murphy =

New Zealand field hockey player

Personal information
- Born: 15 June 2006 (age 20) Gold Coast, Australia

Sport
- Sport: Field hockey
- Position: Midfield
Senior career
Years	Team	Caps	Goals
2025–	Southern Alpiners	-	-
National team
Years	Team	Caps	Goals
2025–	New Zealand	1	(0)
2025–	New Zealand U–21	0	(0)
Medal record
Women's field hockey
Representing New Zealand

Nina Murphy (born 15 June 2006) is an Australian-born field hockey player from New Zealand.

== Personal life ==
Nina Murphy was born and raised in the Gold Coast, Queensland.

She is of Māori descent.

== Career ==
=== Domestic hockey ===
Throughout her youth, Murphy represented her home state, Queensland, in national championships hosted by Hockey Australia. During her junior career in Australia, Murphy impressed national selection panels, being included in the Australian futures squad in 2024.

Following her move to Dunedin in 2025, Murphy was selected in the Southern Alpiners squad to compete in the Junior Hockey League and Premier Hockey League.

=== Under–21 ===
Murphy is set to maker her debut for the national junior team in 2025. She was named in the squad for the FIH Junior World Cup in Santiago.

=== Black Sticks ===
In 2025, Murphy received her first call up to the Black Sticks. She made her senior international debut that year, earning her first cap during a test match against the United States in Charlotte.
