= Mia Schoenbeck =

Japanese field hockey player

Personal information
- Born: November 16, 2004 (age 21) La Grange, Kentucky, United States
- Height: 164 cm (5 ft 5 in)
- Weight: 57 kg (126 lb)

Sport
- Sport: Field hockey
- Position: Midfield
- Club: Demon Deacons
National team
Years	Team	Caps	Goals
2024–	United States U–21	7	(1)
2025–	United States	3	(1)
Medal record
Women's field hockey
Representing United States
Pan American Cup
Silver medal – second place	2025 Montevideo
Pan American Junior Championship
Silver medal – second place	2024 Surrey

Mia Schoenbeck (born November 16, 2004) is a field hockey player from the United States.

== Personal life ==
Mia Schoenbeck was born on 16 November 2004, in La Grange, Kentucky.

She is a student at Wake Forest University, and an alumnus of the Christian Academy of Louisville.

== Career ==
=== Under–21 ===
Schoenbeck made her junior international debut in 2024. She made her first appearances for the United States U–21 team during the Pan American Junior Championship in Surrey. At the tournament, she helped secure the team a silver medal, scoring once throughout the competition.

=== Senior national team ===
Following her successful junior debut in 2024, Schoenbeck received her first call–up to the senior national team, to participate in a training camp.

In 2025, Schoenbeck made her senior international debut. She travelled with the national team to Auckland, where she earned her first senior cap in a match against New Zealand. Following the series, she was named as a travelling reserve for the 2024–25 FIH Nations Cup in Santiago. During the tournament, an injury to a teammate propelled Schoenbeck into the competing squad. She scored her first international goal in her first match of the tournament against Japan.

== International goals ==
The following is a list of goals scored by Schoenbeck at international level.

Goal	Date	Location	Opponent	Score	Result	Competition	Ref.
1	26 February 2025	Centro Deportivo de Hockey Césped Estadio Nacional, Santiago, Chile	Japan	4–1	4–2	2024–25 FIH Nations Cup	
2	17 August 2026	Bellius Hockey Arena. Wavre, Belgium	Scotland	3–1	3–2	2026 Women's Hockey World Cup	
3	24 August 2026	Bellius Hockey Arena. Wavre, Belgium	Ireland	2–1	3–1	2026 Women's Hockey World Cup	
