= Lucy Adams =

American field hockey player

Personal information
- Born: March 29, 2003 (age 23) Andover, MA, United States

Sport
- Sport: Field hockey
- Position: Midfield
National team
Years	Team	Caps	Goals
2023–2024	United States U–21	17	(3)
2025–	United States	15	(0)
Medal record
Women's field hockey
Representing United States
Pan American Cup
Silver medal – second place	2025 Montevideo
Pan American Junior Championship
Gold medal – first place	2023 Bridgetown
Silver medal – second place	2024 Surrey

Lucy Adams (born March 29, 2003) is a field hockey player from the United States.

== Personal life ==
Lucy Adams was born in Andover, Massachusetts.

She is a student at Brown University.

== Career ==
=== Under–21 ===
In 2023, Adams made her first appearances for the United States U–21 team. She was a member of the gold medal-winning squad at the Pan American Junior Championship in Bridgetown. She then went on to represent the side at the FIH Junior World Cup in Santiago, finishing in tenth place.

She made her final appearances for the national junior team in 2024 at her second Pan American Junior Championship in Surrey, where she won a silver medal.

=== Senior national team ===
Adams made her senior international debut in 2025 during a test series against New Zealand in Auckland. She went on to represent the team at her first major tournament, appearing at the 2024–25 FIH Nations Cup in Santiago. She won her first medal with the senior squad later that year, taking home silver at the Pan American Cup.

In 2026 she was named in the squad for the Summer of Hockey Series in Dunedin.
