= 2018 Asian Youth Olympic Games Qualifier (girls' field hockey) =

Tournament details
- Host country: Thailand
- City: Bangkok
- Dates: 25 – 29 April 2018
- Teams: 9
- Venue: Queen Sirikit 60th Anniversary Stadium

Final positions
- Champions: China
- Runner-up: India
- Third place: Malaysia

Tournament statistics
- Matches played: 23
- Goals scored: 217 (9.43 per match)
- Top scorer: (Japan) Akari Nakagomi (14 goals)

The 2018 Asian Youth Olympic Games Qualifier for girls' field hockey event was held from the 25th to the 29th April 2018 in Bangkok, Thailand. Only the winner and runner-up qualified for the 2018 Youth Olympics.

== Qualified teams ==
- China
- Chinese Taipei
- Hong Kong
- India
- Japan
- South Korea
- Malaysia
- Thailand
- Singapore

== Format ==
The nine teams will be split into two groups of four and five teams. The top two teams of each pool advance to the semifinals to determine the winner in a knockout system. The 3rd placed teams from each pool will play for the 5th/6th place. The and 4th placed teams from each pool and the 5th placed team from pool A will play for the 7th/9th place.

== Results ==
All times are local (UTC+7).

=== First round ===
==== Pool A ====
Pos	Team	Pld	W	D	L	GF	GA	GD	Pts	Qualification
1	China	4	4	0	0	50	7	+43	12	Semifinals
2	Malaysia	4	3	0	1	24	13	+11	9	Semifinals
3	Japan	4	2	0	2	40	16	+24	6	Fifth place game
4	Hong Kong	4	1	0	3	7	47	−40	3	Seventh place game
5	Chinese Taipei	4	0	0	4	3	41	−38	0	Seventh to ninth place game

Source: FIH
Rules for classification: 1) points; 2) goal difference; 3) goals scored; 4) head-to-head result.

25 April 2018
09:00

Japan	14–0	Chinese Taipei
Saera 8', 25', 26'; Akari 9', 14', 17', 29'; Haruka 14'; Nishinaga 15', 23'; Kyoka 20'; Kawai 21', 28'; Airi 24'	Report

Umpires:
Shweta Patil (IND)
Ivy Chan (SGP)

25 April 2018
10:00

Malaysia	10–1	Hong Kong
Nornawawi 1', 23'; Hussain 4', 8', 18'; Shiek 4', 11', 29'; Mohd 18', 20'	Report	Khan 22'

Umpires:
Kim Sung-youn (KOR)
Magali Sergeant (BEL)

25 April 2018
16:00

China	15–1	Chinese Taipei
Zou 3'; Cai 4', 6', 11', 20'; Zhang H. 8'; Yu 15', 21', 23'; Gu 18', 19'; Liu 25', 27'; Zhang W. 28', 30'	Report	Cheng 10'

Umpires:
Yanisa Pimsan (THA)
Yukari Satake (JPN)

25 April 2018
17:00

Japan	20–1	Hong Kong
Akari 4', 7', 9', 9', 15', 16', 17', 23', 27'; Miki 4'; Kyoka 10', 28'; Kawai 18', 27'; Saera 19', 20', 20+'; Airi 21', 24'; Haruka 23'	Report	Khan 30'

Umpires:
Shweta Patil (IND)
Kim Sung-youn (KOR)

26 April 2018
09:00

Malaysia	1–9	China
Hussain 13'	Report	Ma 1', 3', 22', 25'; Zhang W. 4'; Gu 9'; Cai 18'; Zou 23'; Yu 26'

Umpires:
Katrina Woolf (NZL)
Yukari Satake (JPN)

26 April 2018
11:00

Hong Kong	3–2	Chinese Taipei
Khan 23'; Lee 25'; Chui 28'	Report	Hong 5'; Chen 28'

Umpires:
Kim Sung-youn (KOR)
Yanisa Pimsan (THA)

26 April 2018
15:00

Japan	3–11	China
Kawai 1'; Akari 15'; Saera 18'	Report	Ma 1', 15'; Liu 2'; Cai 8', 14'; Yu 13', 20'; Zou 22'; Gu 24', 30'; Zhang W. 26'

Umpires:
Shweta Patil (IND)
Katrina Woolf (NZL)

26 April 2018
17:00

Chinese Taipei	0–9	Malaysia
	Report	Mohd 2', 13', 20'; Hussain 7', 25', 26'; Shiek 10'; Elizaberth 27'; Azman 29'

Umpires:
Ivy Chan (SGP)
Yanisa Pimsan (THA)

27 April 2018
11:00

China	15–2	Hong Kong
Zou 2', 8', 17'; Cai 4', 5', 10'; Zhang W. 4'; Zhang H. 19', 20'; Yu 6', 11'; Ma 8'; Gu 16', 21', 28'	Report	Khan 7'; Sik 21'

Umpires:
Shweta Patil (IND)
Yanisa Pimsan (THA)

27 April 2018
12:00

Malaysia	4–3	Japan
Isahhidun 10'; Hussain 16'; Siti 22'; Elizaberth 25'	Report	Saera 1', 28'; Nishinaga 2'

Umpires:
Chen Mei-chen (TPE)
Ivy Chan (SGP)

==== Pool B ====
Pos	Team	Pld	W	D	L	GF	GA	GD	Pts	Qualification
1	India	3	3	0	0	33	0	+33	9	Semifinals
2	South Korea	3	2	0	1	16	14	+2	6	Semifinals
3	Thailand	3	1	0	2	4	19	−15	3	Fifth place game
4	Singapore	3	0	0	3	2	22	−20	0	Seventh to ninth place game

Source: FIH
Rules for classification: 1) points; 2) goal difference; 3) goals scored; 4) head-to-head result.

25 April 2018
16:00

India	14–0	Singapore
Kumari 2', 8', 15', 17', 21', 28'; Khan 5', 20'; Lalremsiami 7', 17', 21'; Chaudhary 8'; Deepika 11', 12'	Report

Umpires:
Katrina Woolf (NZL)
Yao Liu (CHN)

25 April 2018
17:00

South Korea	10–2	Thailand
Ji 3', 12'; Jeon 5'; Lee 6'; Choi 8', 21', 29', 30'; An 15'; Jeong 20'	Report	Todkaew 14'; Jangiaweçhai 24'

Umpires:
Chen Mei-chen (TPE)
Julia Lian (MAS)

26 April 2018
13:00

India	10–0	South Korea
Lalremsiami 1', 4', 21'; Kumari 10', 14', 29', 29'; Khan 11', 12'; Deepika 19'	Report

Umpires:
Magali Sergeant (BEL)
Yao Liu (CHN)

26 April 2018
17:00

Thailand	2–0	Singapore
Prasanpim 2'; Konthong 13'	Report

Umpires:
Yukari Satake (JPN)
Chen Mei-chen (TPE)

27 April 2018
15:00

South Korea	6–2	Singapore
Um 4'; An 10', 24'; Jeong 15'; Hwang 29'; Lee 30'	Report	Tanadika 14'; Sim 17'

Umpires:
Magali Sergeant (BEL)
Yao Liu (CHN)

27 April 2018
17:00

Thailand	0–9	India
	Report	Khan 3', 4', 14', 24'; Lalremsiami 4'; Deepika 12'; Kumari 14', 15'; Chaudhary 25'

Umpires:
Yukari Satake (JPN)
Julia Lian (MAS)

=== Second round ===
==== Fifth to ninth place classification ====
7–9th place bracket

7–9th place semifinals
28 April
Chinese Taipei	3
Singapore	1

Seventh place
29 April
Hong Kong	0
Chinese Taipei	3
Fifth place
29 April
Japan	4
Thailand	2

==== Crossover ====
28 April 2018
12:00

Chinese Taipei	3–1	Singapore
Cheng 1', 16', 27'	Report	Ng 4'

Umpires:
Yukari Satake (JPN)
Yanisa Pimsan (THA)

==== Seventh and eighth place ====
29 April 2018
11:00

Hong Kong	0–3	Chinese Taipei
	Report	Chen 1', 22'; Ko 5'

Umpires:
Julia Lian (MAS)
Ivy Chan (SGP)

==== Fifth and sixth place ====
28 April 2018
11:00

Japan	4–2	Thailand
Kawai 18'; Kyoka 24'; Airi 26', 27'	Report	Konthong 5'; Jangiawechai 23'

Umpires:
Kim Sung-youn (KOR)
Julia Lian (MAS)

==== First to fourth place classification ====
Semi-finals
28 April
China	6
South Korea	0
28 April
India	4
Malaysia	2

Final
29 April
China	4
India	1
Third place
29 April
South Korea	3
Malaysia	5

==== Semifinals ====
28 April 2018
15:00

China	6–0	South Korea
Ma 1', 25', 26'; Zou 4'; Yu 6'; Liu 8'	Report

Umpires:
Magali Sergeant (BEL)
Shweta Patil (IND)

28 April 2018
16:00

India	4–2	Malaysia
Chetna 6'; Chaudhary 14'; Tete 20'; Kumari 23'	Report	Isahhidun 9'; Hussain 27'

Umpires:
Katrina Woolf (NZL)
Yao Liu (CHN)

==== Third and fourth place ====
29 April 2018
14:00

South Korea	3–5	Malaysia
Um 4'; Ji 11'; Choi 18'	Report	Mohd 1'; Hussain 7', 30'; Nornawawi 14'; Elizaberth 25'

Umpires:
Shweta Patil (IND)
Yao Liu (CHN)

==== Final ====
29 April 2019
16:00

China	4–1	India
Liu 3', 4'; Zou 4'; Ma 8'	Report	Chetna 16'

Umpires:
Katrina Woolf (NZL)
Magali Sergeant (BEL)

== Final standings ==
Pos	Team	
1st place, gold medalist(s)	China	Qualified to the 2018 Youth Olympics
2nd place, silver medalist(s)	India	Qualified to the 2018 Youth Olympics
3rd place, bronze medalist(s)	Malaysia	
4	South Korea	
5	Japan	
6	Thailand	
7	Chinese Taipei	
8	Hong Kong	
9	Singapore	

Source: FIH
