= Hannah Gravenall =

New Zealand field hockey player

Personal information
- Born: 15 November 1988 (age 37) Melbourne, Victoria

Sport
- Sport: Field hockey
- Position: Midfield
Senior career
Years	Team	Caps	Goals
2008–	Hawthorn	310	-
2014–2018	Victorian Vipers	26	7
2019–	HC Melbourne	34	9
National team
Years	Team	Caps	Goals
2023–2026	New Zealand	34	(4)
Medal record
Women's field hockey
Representing New Zealand
FIH Nations Cup
Gold medal – first place	2024–25 Santiago
Silver medal – second place	2025–26 Auckland
Oceania Cup
Gold medal – first place	2025 Darwin

Hannah Gravenall (born 15 November 1988) is an Australian born field hockey player from New Zealand.

== Personal life ==
Hannah Gravenall was raised in Swan Reach, Victoria, Australia.

== Career ==
=== Domestic league ===
Hannah Gravenall plays domestically for Hawthorn in Hockey Victoria's Premier League competition.

In Hockey Australia's national league, Gravenall has represented both the Victorian Vipers in the former Australian Hockey League, and HC Melbourne in the JDH Hockey One. In 2022, she was named captain of the Melbourne side, following this up with co-captaincy in 2023.

=== Black Sticks ===
Due to Gravenall's dual Australian–New Zealand heritage, she was able to receive a call up the New Zealand national side. In 2023 she received her first call up to the represent the Black Sticks. She made her senior international debut during a test series against the United States in Charlotte.

In 2024, Gravenall was named in the Black Sticks official squad.

After three years in the national set up, Gravenall called time on her international career in 2026, making the decision to retire from international hockey.

==== International goals ====
Goal	Date	Location	Opponent	Score	Result	Competition	Ref.
1	10 December 2023	United States Performance Center, Charlotte, United States	United States	2–5	4–5	Test Match	
2	4 June 2024	Estadi Martí Colomer, Terrassa, Spain	Japan	2–2	2–2	2023–24 FIH Nations Cup	
3	24 January 2026	Alexander McMillan Hockey Centre, Dunedin, New Zealand	Japan	1–0	1–0	2026 Summer of Hockey	
4	15 June 2026	National Hockey Centre, Auckland, New Zealand	South Korea	2–1	3–1	2025–26 FIH Nations Cup	
