= Megan Valzonis =

American field hockey player

Personal information
- Born: March 15, 1999 (age 27) San Diego, California, U.S.

Sport
- Sport: Field hockey
- Position: Forward
- Club: RUSH
National team
| Years | Team | Caps | Goals |
| 2019 | United States U–21 | 2 | (0) |
| 2021– | United States | 35 | (4) |

Megan Valzonis (née Rodgers) is an American field hockey player.

In 2024, she will represent the United States at the XXXIII Olympic Games in France.

== Personal life ==
Megan Valzonis was born on March 15, 1999, in San Diego, California.

She is a former student of the University of California.

== Career ==
=== Under–21 ===
Valzonis made her junior international debut in 2019. She represented the American U–21 team during a test series against Germany in Viersen and Mönchengladbach.

=== National team ===
In 2021, Valzonis made her senior international debut. She earned her first senior cap during a test series against Canada in Chula Vista.

Since her debut, Valzonis has been a constant inclusion in the national squad. She has appeared in seasons three, four and five of the FIH Pro League, as well as various test series'. In 2024, she was named in the Team USA squad for the XXXIII Olympic Games in Paris.

=== International goals ===
| Goal | Date | Location | Opponent | Score | Result | Competition | Ref. |
|---|---|---|---|---|---|---|---|
| 1 | April 24, 2022 | Karen Shelton Stadium, Chapel Hill, United States | England | 1–0 | 2–2 | 2021–22 FIH Pro League | |
| 2 | June 18, 2022 | Hazelaarweg Stadion, Rotterdam, Netherlands | China | 2–3 | 2–3 | 2021–22 FIH Pro League | |
| 3 | June 20, 2023 | Lee Valley Hockey Stadium, London, England | Netherlands | 2–0 | 2–3 | 2022–23 FIH Pro League | |
| 4 | June 6, 2024 | Lee Valley Hockey Stadium, London, England | Great Britain | 1–1 | 3–1 | 2023–24 FIH Pro League | |
