= Anna Willocks =

New Zealand field hockey player (born 1996)

Personal information
- Full name: Anna Grace Willocks
- Born: 29 December 1996 (age 29) Palmerston North, New Zealand

Sport
- Sport: Field hockey
- Position: Forward
Senior career
Years	Team	Caps	Goals
2019–2024	Canterbury	-	-
2024–	Central Falcons	-	-
National team
Years	Team	Caps	Goals
2023–	New Zealand	19	(3)
Medal record
Women's field hockey
Representing New Zealand
FIH Nations Cup
Gold medal – first place	2024–25 Santiago

Anna Grace Willocks (born 29 December 1996) is an indoor and field hockey player from New Zealand.

== Early life ==
Anna Willocks grew up in Palmerston North, a city on New Zealand's North Island.

She is an alumna of Saint Joseph's University, graduating with a psychology major and an autism behaviour studies minor.

== Career ==
=== National league ===
In the Premier Hockey League, Willocks plays for the Central Falcons. She has also previously represented Canterbury in the Ford National Hockey Championship.

=== Black Sticks ===
Willocks made her senior international debut for the Black Sticks in 2023. She made her first appearances during the Christchurch Leg of the fourth season of the FIH Pro League. Later in the year she represented the team again during a test series against the United States in Charlotte.

In 2024 she appeared in her first major tournament, taking the field during the 2023–24 FIH Nations Cup in Terrassa.
