= Rui Takashima =

Japanese field hockey player

Personal information
- Born: 21 November 1999 (age 26) Oyabe, Japan
- Height: 165 cm (5 ft 5 in)
- Weight: 54 kg (119 lb)

Sport
- Sport: Field hockey
- Position: Forward
- Club: Sony HC Bravia Ladies
National team
Years	Team	Caps	Goals
2022–	Japan	21	(2)
Medal record
Women's field hockey
Representing Japan
FIH Nations Cup
Bronze medal – third place	2022–23 Valencia
Girls' Asia Cup
Silver medal – second place	2016 Bangkok

Rui Takashima (高島 瑠唯, born 21 November 1999) is a field hockey player from Japan.

== Personal life ==
Rui Takashima was born on 21 November 1999, in Oyabe, a city in the Toyama Prefecture.

She is a former student of Yamanashi Gakuin University.

== Career ==
=== Domestic league ===
In the Japanese national league, Takashima represents the Sony HC Bravia Ladies.

=== Cherry Blossoms ===
Takashima received her first call–up to the Cherry Blossoms in 2022. She was a reserve player for the squad at the FIH World Cup, held in Amsterdam and Terrassa. She made her senior international debut later that year at the FIH Nations Cup in Valencia, where she won a bronze medal.

She did not represent the national team again until 2024. She competed at the FIH Olympic Qualifiers in Ranchi, the International Festival of Hockey in Perth, and at the FIH Nations Cup in Terrassa. She was also named as a reserve player for the 2024 Summer Olympics in Paris.

In 2025 she was named in the squad for the FIH Nations Cup in Santiago.

== International goals ==
The following is a list of goals scored by Takashima at international level.

Goal	Date	Location	Opponent	Score	Result	Competition	Ref.
1	12 December 2022	Estadio Beteró, Valencia, Spain	India	1–2	1–2	2022–23 FIH Nations Cup	
2	16 July 2024	HC Zwolle, Zwolle, Netherlands	Netherlands	1–5	1–6	Test Match	
