= Emelia Surridge =

New Zealand field hockey player (born 2001)

Personal information
- Full name: Emelia Brigid Surridge
- Born: 23 September 2004 (age 21) Christchurch, New Zealand

Sport
- Sport: Field hockey
- Position: Forward
Senior career
Years	Team	Caps	Goals
2024–	Southern Alpiners	-	-
National team
Years	Team	Caps	Goals
2023–	New Zealand U–21	3	(1)
2025–	New Zealand	6	(1)
Medal record
Women's field hockey
Representing New Zealand
FIH Nations Cup
Gold medal – first place	2024–25 Santiago
Junior Oceania Cup
Silver medal – second place	2025 Auckland

Emelia 'Mezzy' Brigid Surridge (born 23 September 2004) is a field hockey player from New Zealand.

== Personal life ==
Emelia Surridge was born and raised in Christchurch, New Zealand. She is an alumna of St Margaret's College.

== Career ==
=== National league ===
In the Premier Hockey League, Surridge plays for the Southern Alpiners.

She has also previously represented Canterbury in the Ford National Hockey Championship.

=== Under–21 ===
Surridge has been a member of the Junior Black Sticks squad since 2023. She was a reserve player for the 2023 FIH Junior World Cup in Santiago.

In 2025 she was named in the squad to participate in the Junior Oceania Cup in Auckland.

=== Black Sticks ===
Surridge received her first call-up into the Black Sticks squad in 2024. She made her senior international debut in 2025, during a test series against the United States in Auckland.
