= Jeong Da-bin (field hockey) =

South Korean field hockey player (born 2000)

Personal information
- Born: 25 February 2000 (age 26) South Korea

Sport
- Sport: Field hockey
- Position: Defence
- Club: Pyeongtaek City Hall
National team
Years	Team	Caps	Goals
2018–2018	South Korea U–18	5	(1)
2025–	South Korea	13	(6)
Medal record
Women's field hockey
Representing South Korea

Jeong Da-bin (Korean: 정다빈, born 25 February 2000) is a field hockey player from South Korea, who plays as a defender.

== Career ==
=== Under–18 ===
Throughout 2018, Jeong represented the South Korean U–18 team. She was a member of the side at the Asian Youth Olympic Qualifiers in Bangkok.

=== Senior national team ===
Jeong made her senior international debut for South Korea in 2025. She earned her first senior international cap at the 2024–25 FIH Nations Cup in Santiago. At the tournament, she finished as the highest goalscorer, with four goals. Since her debut, she has appeared in a test series against Germany in Wiesbaden in 2025. Her most recent appearances came at the 2025 Asian Cup in Hangzhou.

== International goals ==
Goal	Date	Location	Opponent	Score	Result	Competition	Ref.
1	23 February 2025	Claudia Schüler Hockey Centre, Santiago, Chile	New Zealand	2–1	4–5	2024–25 FIH Nations Cup	
2	23 February 2025	Claudia Schüler Hockey Centre, Santiago, Chile	New Zealand	3–1	4–5	2024–25 FIH Nations Cup	
3	1 March 2025	Claudia Schüler Hockey Centre, Santiago, Chile	Japan	3–1	4–5	2024–25 FIH Nations Cup	
4	2 March 2025	Claudia Schüler Hockey Centre, Santiago, Chile	Canada	1–0	2–0	2024–25 FIH Nations Cup	
5	25 July 2025	Wiesbadener Tennis-und Hockeyclub, Wiesbaden, Germany	Germany	1–3	1–4	Test Match	
6	8 September 2025	Gongshu Canal Sports Park Stadium, Hangzhou, China	Malaysia	4–0	5–0	2025 Asian Cup	
