= Ishika Chaudhary =

Indian hockey player (born 2000)

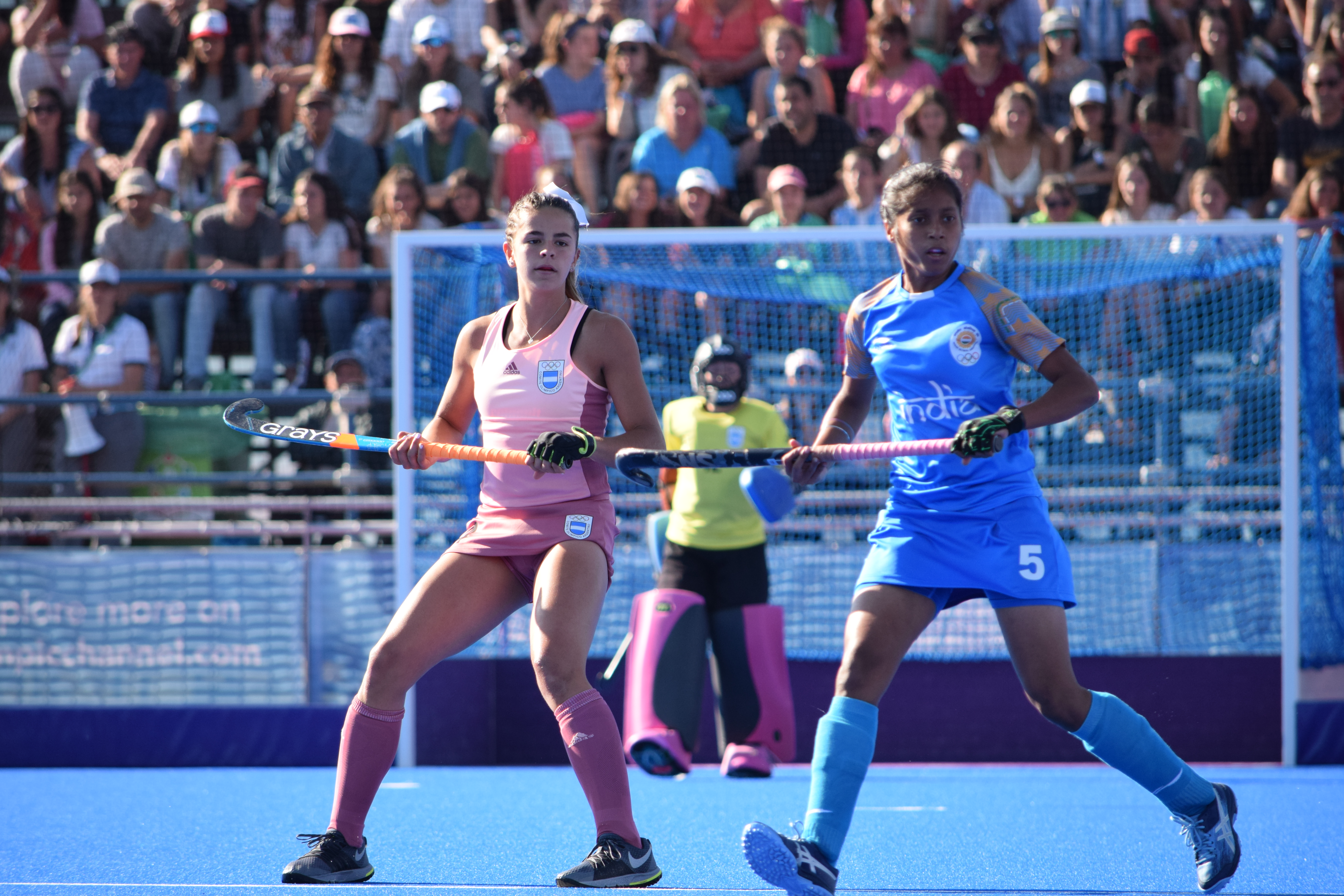
- María Cerundolo (L) and Ishika at the 2018 Summer Youth Olympics

Personal information
- Born: 15 April 2000 (age 26) Madhya Pradesh, India

Sport
- Sport: Field hockey
- Position: Defender
Senior career
Years	Team	Caps	Goals
–	Indian Oil Corporation Ltd	-	-
2025–	Odisha Warriors	-	-
National team
Years	Team	Caps	Goals
2018	India U18 Hockey5s	13	(5)
2019–2022	India U21	14	(0)
2022–	India	94	(1)
Medal record
Women's field hockey
Representing India
Asian Games
Gold medal – first place	2026 Aichi–Nagoya	Team
Bronze medal – third place	2022 Hangzhou	Team
Asia Cup
Silver medal – second place	2025 Hangzhou
Bronze medal – third place	2022 Muscat
Asian Champions Trophy
Gold medal – first place	2023 Ranchi
Gold medal – first place	2024 Rajgir
FIH Nations Cup
Gold medal – first place	2022 Spain
Youth Olympic Games
Silver medal – second place	2018 Buenos Aires	Team

Ishika Chaudhary (born 15 April 2000) is an Indian field hockey player and a member of Indian hockey team. She hails from Madhya Pradesh. She plays for Indian Oil Corporation Limited in the domestic hockey tournaments. She made her debut for the Senior India team in 2022. She plays as a defender.

== Early life ==
Ishika chaudhary was born in Gwalior, Madhya Pradesh, India.

== Hockey career ==
Ishika learnt her basics at the MP Women's Hockey Academy, Gwalior. She performed well for MP in the back-to-back Junior Nationals at Bhopal in 2016 and 2017 and was called for the National camp in 2017. She was part of the Indian Hockey team that won the silver medal at the 3rd Youth Olympic Games 2018 held at Buenos Aires, Argentina. She also took part in the qualifier for the Under-18 YOG held at Bangkok in April 2018 where she scored three goals. Later, she was part of the Indian team that took part in the FIH Hockey Women's Junior World Cup 2022, Potchefstroom, South Africa where India finished fourth.
