= Riana Pho =

New Zealand field hockey player

Personal information
- Born: 5 May 2005 (age 21) Sydney, Australia

Sport
- Sport: Field hockey
- Position: Defence
Senior career
Years	Team	Caps	Goals
2023–	Wellington	-	-
National team
Years	Team	Caps	Goals
2022–	New Zealand U–21	13	(4)
2023–	New Zealand	23	(1)
Medal record
Women's field hockey
Representing New Zealand
Oceania Cup
Gold medal – first place	2025 Darwin
FIH Nations Cup
Gold medal – first place	2024–25 Santiago
Junior Oceania Cup
Silver medal – second place	2022 Canberra
Silver medal – second place	2025 Auckland

Riana Pho (born 5 May 2005) is a field hockey player from New Zealand.

== Personal life ==
Pho was born and raised in Sydney, Australia. She moved to Wellington, New Zealand at the age of ten.

She is of Cambodian and Filipino descent.

== Career ==
=== Under–21 ===
Pho made her international debut for New Zealand at Under–21 level. She represented the junior squad at the 2022 Junior Oceania Cup in Canberra, where she won a silver medal.

In 2023 she was named in the squad again, also receiving a call–up for the FIH Junior World Cup in Santiago, Chile.

=== Black Sticks ===
In 2023, Pho received her first call up to the senior national team. She made her Black Sticks debut during season four of the FIH Pro League.

Pho scored her first international goal at the 2024-25 Nations Cup in Santiago during a 5–4 win over South Korea in the pool stage.
