= Katie Dixon =

American field hockey player (born 2002)

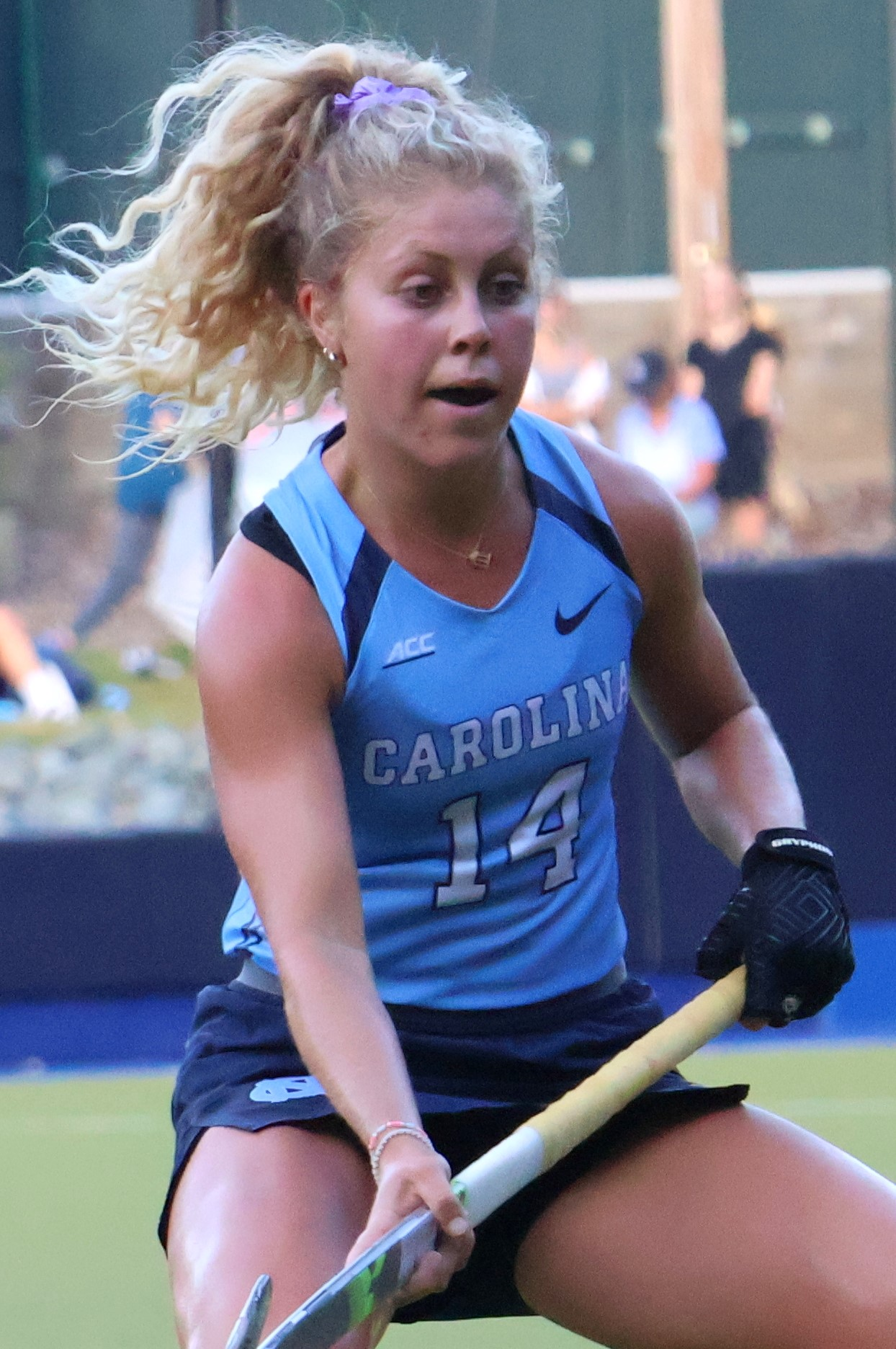
- Dixon with North Carolina in 2024

Personal information
- Born: June 18, 2002 (age 24)
- Height: 5 ft 5 in (165 cm)

Sport
- Sport: Field hockey
- Position: Midfielder
Senior career
Years	Team	Caps	Goals
2020–2024	North Carolina Tar Heels	-	-
National team
Years	Team	Caps	Goals
2023–	United States		-
Medal record
Pan American Cup
Silver medal – second place	2025 Montevideo

Katie Dixon (born June 18, 2002) is an American field hockey player. She played college field hockey for the North Carolina Tar Heels, where she won three national championships (2020, 2022, and 2023).

== Early life ==
Dixon grew up in Cary, North Carolina, and attended Cary Christian School. She grew up playing basketball, soccer, and field hockey before choosing the latter in high school. She won the North Carolina state championship as a freshman, earned all-state honors two times, and captained the team two years, even as she missed her junior season due to an ACL tear. She played club field hockey for the Carolina All-Stars.

== College career ==
Dixon played in all 20 games (10 starts) in her freshman season with the North Carolina Tar Heels in 2020. Her first career goal was the opening goal in a 3–0 win against Iowa in the semifinals of the NCAA tournament. She started every game of the tournament as North Carolina won its third consecutive national title (and ninth overall), beating Michigan 4–3 in the final. In her sophomore season, she appeared in 19 games (9 starts). She did not start in the last five games of the season, including North Carolina's first-round loss to Northwestern in the NCAA tournament. She appeared in every game off the bench in her junior season as North Carolina went 21–0, defeating Northwestern 2–1 in the 2022 national title game.

Dixon became one of North Carolina's captains in her senior season, the first year with her former teammate Erin Matson as head coach. She started all 21 games and scored a career-high 5 goals with 5 assists. She helped the team repeat as national champions, putting away her shot in the penalty shootout against Northwestern in the final. She returned for a fifth season, using her extra year of eligibility granted by the NCAA because of the COVID-19 pandemic. She started all 21 games, scored 3 goals, and added a career-high 9 assists, earning second-team All-ACC honors. North Carolina went undefeated all the way to the 2024 national semifinals, where they lost 2–1 to Saint Joseph's (Pennsylvania).

== International career ==
Dixon represented the United States junior national team at the 2022 and 2023 Women's FIH Hockey Junior World Cups and won gold at the 2023 Women's Junior Pan American Championship.

In 2023, Dixon was named to the senior national team for the first time. The following year, she played for the practice squad against the national team selected to the Paris Olympics.
