= Josie Hollamon =

American field hockey player (born 2005)

Personal information
- Born: January 7, 2005 (age 21) Delmar, Delaware, U.S.

Sport
- Sport: Field hockey
- Position: Defence
Senior career
Years	Team	Caps	Goals
2023–	University of Maryland	-	-
National team
Years	Team	Caps	Goals
2023–	United States	5	(0)
2023–	United States U–21	4	(0)
Medal record
Women's field hockey
Representing United States
Pan American Cup
Silver medal – second place	2025 Montevideo
Pan American Junior Championship
Gold medal – first place	2023 Saint Michael
Silver medal – second place	2024 Surrey

Josie Hollamon (born January 7, 2005) is an American field hockey defender who has played as part of the United States women's national field hockey team.

== Personal life ==
Josie Hollamon was born and raised in Delmar, Delaware. She is a student at the University of Maryland.

== Career ==
=== Under–21 ===
Hollamon made her debut for the United States U–21 team in 2023 at the Pan American Junior Championship in Saint Michael, where she won a gold medal. She was also named in the squad for the FIH Junior World Cup in Santiago later that year.

=== National team ===
In 2023, Hollamon made her senior international debut during season four of the FIH Pro League.
