= United States women's national field hockey team =

United States
- Association: USA Field Hockey
- Confederation: PAHF (Americas)
- Head Coach: David Passmore
- Assistant coach(es): Bert Remmerswaal
- Manager: Maddie Hinch; Krista Page
- Captain: Amanda Magadan
Home	Away

FIH ranking
- Current: 10 (October 3, 2026)

Olympic Games
- Appearances: 7 (first in 1984)
- Best result: (bronze) 3rd (1984)

World Cup
- Appearances: 10 (first in 1983)
- Best result: (bronze) 3rd (1994)

Pan American Games
- Appearances: 9 (first in 1987)
- Best result: (gold) 1st (2011, 2015)

Pan American Cup
- Appearances: 7 (first in 2001)
- Best result: (silver) 2nd (2001, 2004, 2009, 2013, 2025)
Medal record
Olympic Games
Bronze medal – third place	1984 Los Angeles	Team
World Cup
Bronze medal – third place	1994 Dublin
Pan American Games
Gold medal – first place	2011 Guadalajara	Team
Gold medal – first place	2015 Toronto	Team
Silver medal – second place	1987 Indianapolis	Team
Silver medal – second place	1995 Mar del Plata	Team
Silver medal – second place	1999 Winnipeg	Team
Silver medal – second place	2003 Santo Domingo	Team
Silver medal – second place	2007 Rio de Janeiro	Team
Silver medal – second place	2023 Santiago	Team
Bronze medal – third place	1991 Havana	Team
Bronze medal – third place	2019 Lima	Team
Pan American Cup
Silver medal – second place	2001 Kingston
Silver medal – second place	2004 Bridgetown
Silver medal – second place	2009 Hamilton
Silver medal – second place	2013 Mendoza
Silver medal – second place	2025 Montevideo
Bronze medal – third place	2017 Lancaster

The United States women's national field hockey team represents the United States in international field hockey. The team is currently coached by David Passmore. It made its first international appearance in 1920 when a touring team visited England, coached by Constance M.K. Applebee. The team made several international appearances in the early 20th century, leading to the United States hosting the 8th International Federation of Women's Hockey Associations Tournament in 1963. Once the IFWHA merged with its counterpart on the men's side, the United States' first appearance at an FIH-sanctioned tournament was the 1983 Women's Hockey World Cup in Kuala Lumpur, Malaysia, where the Americans ended up in sixth place. They have won bronze at the Los Angeles 1984 Summer Olympics and bronze at the 1994 World Cup.

== Olympics ==
=== Los Angeles 1984 Olympics ===
During the 1984 Summer Olympics, the team won their first international prize, a bronze medal. This happened after the Netherlands defeated Australia (2–0) in the final match of the round-robin tournament and Australia and the United States were left tied for third place with identical records: two wins, two losses, one draw, and nine goals scored and seven goals conceded. Following the Netherlands-Australia match, the United States players came down from the stands and competed with the Australians in a penalty shoot-out to decide the bronze medal. The U.S. won the shootout (10–5) to claim America's first Olympic medal in women's field hockey.

=== Beijing 2008 Olympics ===
The Olympic qualifying squad placed first in the second series of games during the 2008 Women's Hockey Olympic Qualifier. At the Olympics, the team finished fourth in pool B and lost the seventh/eight place play-off to Germany 2–4, finishing in eighth place.

=== London 2012 Olympics ===
The USWNT qualified for the London 2012 Summer Olympics after defeating Argentina 4–2 at the Pan American Games in Guadalajara, Mexico. The U.S. had high hopes of finishing their rocky 2012 Olympic campaign on a high note. Unfortunately, that did not happen for Team USA as the final match at Riverbank Arena in London's Olympic Park ended with a disappointing 2–1 loss to Belgium, leaving the U.S. with a last place finish in the tournament.

=== Rio 2016 Olympics ===
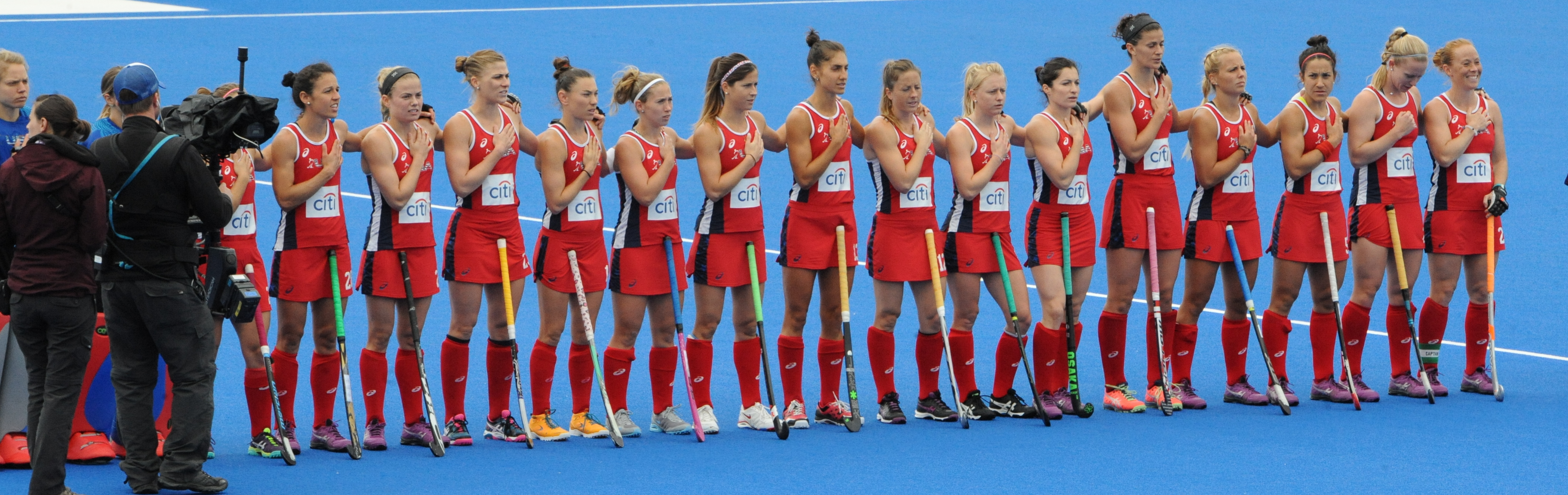
The team in 2016

In similar fashion to qualifying for the London 2012 Olympics, the USWNT defeated Argentina at the Pan American Games in Toronto, Canada to punch their ticket to the Rio 2016 Summer Olympics. In pool play the USWNT toppled both global hockey powerhouses Argentina (2nd FIH World Ranked) and Australia (3rd FIH World Ranked) with the same score of 2–1. Continuing in their preliminary schedule, the U.S. pushed past Japan (6–1) and India (3–0). The match in quarterfinal play with Great Britain blemished the undefeated record of USWNT and resulted in a loss, 2–1. They placed fifth.

== Tournament history ==
Olympic Games
Year	Host city	Position
1980	Moscow, Soviet Union	N/A
1984	Los Angeles, United States	3rd
1988	Seoul, South Korea	8th
1996	Atlanta, United States	5th
2008	Beijing, China	8th
2012	London, United Kingdom	12th
2016	Rio de Janeiro, Brazil	5th
2024	Paris, France	9th

FIH World Cup
Year	Host city	Position
1983	Kuala Lumpur, Malaysia	6th
1986	Amsterdam, Netherlands	9th
1990	Sydney, Australia	12th
1994	(Republic of Ireland) Dublin, Ireland	3rd
1998	Utrecht, Netherlands	8th
2002	Perth, Australia	9th
2006	Madrid, Spain	6th
2014	The Hague, Netherlands	4th
2018	London, England	14th
2026	Wavre, Belgium/ Amstelveen, Netherlands	10th

FIH World League
Year	Round	Host city	Position
2012–13	Round 2	Rio de Janeiro, Brazil	1st
2012–13	Semifinals	London, England	5th
2014–15	Semifinals	Valencia, Spain	5th
2016–17	Semifinals	Johannesburg, South Africa	1st
2016–17	Final	Auckland, New Zealand	7th

Pan American Games
Year	Host city	Position
1987	Indianapolis, United States	2nd
1991	Havana, Cuba	3rd
1995	Mar del Plata, Argentina	2nd
1999	Winnipeg, Canada	2nd
2003	Santo Domingo, Dominican Republic	2nd
2007	Rio de Janeiro, Brazil	2nd
2011	Guadalajara, Mexico	1st
2015	Toronto, Canada	1st
2019	Lima, Peru	3rd
2023	Santiago, Chile	2nd

Pan American Cup
Year	Host city	Position
2001	Kingston, Jamaica	2nd
2004	Bridgetown, Barbados	2nd
2009	Hamilton, Bermuda	2nd
2013	Mendoza, Argentina	2nd
2017	Lancaster, United States	3rd
2022	Santiago, Chile	4th
2025	Montevideo, Uruguay	2nd

Champions Trophy
Year	Host city	Position
1987–1993 Did not participate
1995	Mar del Plata, Argentina	3rd
1997	Berlin, Germany	6th
1999–2014 Did not participate
2016	London, United Kingdom	3rd

FIH Pro League
Year	Season	Position
2019	Season One	9th
2020–21	Season Two	9th
2021–22	Season Three	9th
2022–23	Season Four	9th
2023–24	Season Five	9th ▼

FIH Nations Cup
Year	Finals Host city	Position
2022–2024 Did not participate
2024–25	Santiago, Chile	4th
2025–26	Auckland, New Zealand	3rd

== Results and fixtures ==
The following is a list of match results in the last 12 months, as well as any future matches that have been scheduled.

Win Draw Loss Fixture

=== 2026 ===
21 January 2026 Summer Hockey Series Match 1	New Zealand	1–2	United States	Dunedin, New Zealand
18:30	H. Cotter 23'	Report	Ramsey 37'; Tamer 57'	Stadium: Alexander McMillan Hockey Centre

22 January 2026 Summer Hockey Series Match 2	United States	4–0	Japan	Dunedin, New Zealand
16:30	Hoffman 13'; Sholder 40'; Heck 43'; Yeager 49'	Report		Stadium: Alexander McMillan Hockey Centre

24 January 2026 Summer Hockey Series Match 3	United States	4–1	New Zealand A	Dunedin, New Zealand
14:00	H. Cotter 33'; Shannon 42'; Surridge 52'; Pho 58'	Report	Willocks 6'	Stadium: Alexander McMillan Hockey Centre

25 January 2026 Final	United States	2–1	New Zealand	Dunedin, New Zealand
16:00	Tamer 29'; Gladieux 43'	Report	H. Cotter 32'	Stadium: Alexander McMillan Hockey Centre

1 June 2026 Practice series Game 1	Australia	2–2	United States	Perth, Australia
14:45	Williams 12'; Arnott 20'	Report	Sessa 30+'; Dixon 44'

2 June 2026 Practice series Game 2	Australia	2–2	United States	Perth, Australia
14:45	Kershaw 13', 31'	Report	Adams 11'; Gladieux 42'

4 June 2026 Practice series Game 3	Australia	3–1	United States	Perth, Australia
10:45	Downes 23'; Mathison 44'; Young 59'	Report	24'

5 June 2026 Practice series Game 4	Australia	1–2	United States	Perth, Australia
10:45	47'	Report	11'; 50'

15 June 2026 Nations Cup Pool A	India	3–2	United States	Auckland, New Zealand
10:45	Deepika 17', 24'; Navneet 28'	Report	Sessa 4'; Zimmer 7'	Stadium: National Hockey Centre

16 June 2026 Nations Cup Pool A	United States	7–2	Uruguay	Auckland, New Zealand
10:45	Sessa 3'; Tamer 8', 17', 41', 47'; Yeager 12'; Heck 30'	Report	Curutchague 4'; Vilar 38'	Stadium: National Hockey Centre

18 June 2026 Nations Cup Pool A	United States	4–0	Japan	Auckland, New Zealand
13:00	Danahy 1'; Sessa 10', 32'; Zimmer 44'	Report		Stadium: National Hockey Centre

20 June 2026 Nations Cup Semi finals	New Zealand	1–1 (4–1 p)	United States	Auckland, New Zealand
18:30	Cotter 35'	Report	Hoffman 31'	Stadium: National Hockey Centre
	Penalties
	Shannon (penalty shoot-out scored); Cotter (penalty shoot-out scored); Pho (penalty shoot-out scored); Murray (penalty shoot-out scored)		(penalty shoot-out missed) Adams; (penalty shoot-out missed) Heck; (penalty shoot-out scored) Sessa

21 June 2026 3/4 Classification	Chile	2–3	United States	Auckland, New Zealand
16:00	Arrieta 26'; Maldonado 30'	Report	Sessa 12', 46'; Hoffman 34'	Stadium: National Hockey Centre

15 August 2026 World Cup Pool B	Argentina	1–1	United States	Wavre, Belgium
17:30	Bruggesser 11'	Report	DeBerdine 27'	Stadium: Belfius Hockey Arena

17 August 2026 World Cup Pool B	United States	3–2	Scotland	Wavre, Belgium
11:00	D'Ariano 4'; Gladieux 24'; Schoenbeck 39'	Report	Robertson 10'; Steiger 40'	Stadium: Belfius Hockey Arena

19 August 2026 World Cup Pool B	United States	1–3	Germany	Wavre, Belgium
14:00	Sessa 39'	Report	Fleschütz 21', 43'; Nolte 33'	Stadium: Belfius Hockey Arena

22 August 2026 World Cup Pool H	United States	1–1	New Zealand	Wavre, Belgium
14:30	Danahy 39'	Report	Surridge 8'	Stadium: Belfius Hockey Arena

24 August 2026 World Cup Pool H	Ireland	1–3	United States	Wavre, Belgium
14:00	Carey 13'	Report	Adams 27'; Schoenbeck 42'; Tamer 52'	Stadium: Belfius Hockey Arena

27 August 2026 World Cup 9th place match	England	3–1	United States	Wavre, Belgium
14:00	Neal 11'; Owsley 25'; Howard 55'	Report	Heck 20'	Stadium: Belfius Hockey Arena

== Team ==
=== Current squad ===
Roster for the 2026 Women's FIH Hockey World Cup.

Head coach: David Passmore

1. Abigail Tamer
2. Meredith Sholder (C)
3. Ashley Sessa
4. Sophia Gladieux
8. Madeleine Zimmer
10. Reese D'Ariano
11. Katie Dixon
13. Ashley Hoffman
14. Sanne Caarls
16. Emma DeBerdine
17. Elizabeth Yeager
18. Claire Danahy
20. Leah Crouse
21. Lauren Wadas
26. Lucy Adams
27. Ryleigh Heck
29. Bethany Dykema
31. Kelsey Bing (GK)
32. Jennifer Rizzo (GK)
36. Mia Schoenbeck

=== Notable players ===
- Beth Anders
- Katie Bam
- Kate Barber
- Beth Beglin
- Jackie Briggs
- Lauren Crandall
- Rachel Dawson
- Katelyn Falgowski
- Stefanie Fee
- Kris Fillat
- Tracey Fuchs
- Melissa González
- Sheryl Johnson
- Michelle Kasold
- Barbara Marois
- Charlene Morett-Curtiss
- Marcia Pankratz
- Elizabeth K. Ralph*
- Karen Shelton
- Amy Tran
- Michelle Vittese

=== Record by competition from 2020 on ===
Jersey #	Competitions											
Jersey #	2020	2021	2022		2023		2024		2025		2026	
Jersey #	PL	PL	PAC	PL	PAG	PL	OQ	OG	NC	PAC	NC	WC
1		Matson		Tamer						Tamer		
2	Moyer				Sholder			Sholder				
3	Jecko	Sessa									Sessa	
4	Grega								Gladieux			
5	Umstead			Bent-Cole								
6	Bramley	Rodgers		Rodgers		Valzonis		Valzonis			Valzonis	
7	Campbell	Wolgemuth										
8	Parker	DeBerdine B.		Deberdine B.		DeBerdine B.			Zimmer			
9	Rigg	Briddel		Zimmer								
10	Maguire	Randall		de Vries		de Vries			D'Ariano			
11	West	Tornetta							Dixon			
12	Golini											
13	Hoffman			Hoffman							Hoffman	
14					Caarls			Caarls		Caarls		Caarls
15		Gobaert		Gobaert		Gobaert						
16	Gonzales			Gonzales					DeBerdine E.			
17	Dessoye	Yeager								Yeager		
18	Barham	Marshall								Danahy		
19				Hollamon					Hollamon			
20		Crouse		Crouse								
21	Hammel											Wadas
22	Woods	Sumfest				Sumfest			Sumfest			
23						Gladieux		Gladieux	Ramsey			
24	Lepage					Lepage						
25	Kisha											
26		Rose							Adams			
27	Hurff	de Vries		DeBerdine E.						Heck		
28	Randall		Southam									
29											Dykema	
30	Reeb					Reeb			Reeb			
31	Bing									Bing		
32	Yeager	Rizzo		Rizzo		Rizzo			Rizzo			
33	Hanks											
34	Tornetta	Wirth				Wadas					Wadas	
35	Bacskai	Caarls		Caarls		Caarls						
36		Sholder		Sholder		Sholder					Schoenbeck	
37	Briddel	Zimmer										
38	Wolgemuth											
39		Bent-Cole							Croon			
40		Konerth										
HC	Nelson-Nichols; Farry	Drake	Farry	Passmore								
Result	9th		4th	9th	2nd place, silver medalist(s)	9th	2nd place, silver medalist(s)	9th	4th	2nd place, silver medalist(s)	3rd place, bronze medalist(s)	Q

== See also ==
- United States men's national field hockey team
- USA Field Hockey
- USA Field Hockey Hall of Fame
