= Brooke DeBerdine =

American field hockey player

Personal information
- Born: May 19, 1999 (age 27) Millersville, Pennsylvania, U.S.

Sport
- Sport: Field hockey
- Position: Midfield
Senior career
Years	Team	Caps	Goals
–	Nook Hockey	-	-
National team
Years	Team	Caps	Goals
2016–2019	United States U–21	8	(0)
2021–	United States	17	(0)
Medal record
Women's field hockey
Representing United States
FIH Olympic Qualifiers
Silver medal – second place	2024 Ranchi	Team

Brooke DeBerdine (/dəˈbɜːrdaɪn/ də-BUR-dyne; born May 19, 1999) is an American field hockey player, who plays as a midfielder.

== Personal life ==
Brooke DeBerdine was born and raised in Millersville, Pennsylvania. Her younger sister Emma also represents the United States in field hockey.

She studied her major in Supply Chain Management at the University of Maryland.

== Career ==
=== Domestic leagues ===
In 2022, DeBerdine travelled to Australia to play for the Tassie Tigers in the Sultana Bran Hockey One League.

=== National teams ===
==== Under–21 ====
Brooke DeBerdine made her debut for the United States U–21 team in 2016 at the FIH Junior World Cup in Santiago.

She represented the team again in 2019 during a test series against Germany, held in Mönchengladbach and Viersen.

==== National team ====
DeBerdine made her debut for the national team in 2021, during a test series against Canada in Chula Vista.

She has since gone on to appear in season three of the FIH Pro League.
