= Kealsie Reeb =

American field hockey player

Personal information
- Full name: Kealsie Robles Reeb
- Born: 28 February 1997 (age 29) Seaford, Virginia, United States
- Height: 173 cm (5 ft 8 in)

Sport
- Sport: Field hockey
- Position: Goalkeeper
National team
| Years | Team | Caps | Goals |
| 2018– | United States | 35 | (0) |
| 2023– | United States Hockey5s | 12 | (0) |
Medal record
Women's field hockey
Representing United States
Pan American Hockey5s Cup
| Gold medal – first place | 2023 Kingston |

Kealsie Robles Reeb (née Monique Robles, born 28 February 1997) is a field hockey goalkeeper from the United States.

== Personal life ==
Kealsie Reeb was born and raised in Seaford, Virginia.

She is an alumna of Old Dominion University. Reeb is currently the assistant field hockey coach at Queens University of Charlotte.

== Career ==
=== Senior national team ===
Reeb made her senior international debut in 2018. She was a member of the United States squad at the SOMPO Cup in Osaka.

Since her debut, Reeb has been consistently named in the national squad. She featured in the first five seasons of the FIH Pro League before the United States' relegation to the FIH Nations Cup in 2025. She was also the reserve goalkeeper for Team USA at the 2019 Pan American Games in Lima.

Her most recent selection in the national squad came in 2024. She was named to competed in a test series against New Zealand in Auckland in January 2025.

=== Hockey5s ===
She also represents the United States in the Hockey5s format. She was a member of the gold medal-winning squad at the 2023 Pan American Hockey5s Cup in Kingston, as well as the inaugural edition of the FIH Hockey5s World Cup in Muscat in 2024.
