= Sophia Gladieux =

American field hockey player

Phia Gladieux
Personal information
- Full name: Sophia Elizabeth Gladieux
- Born: June 14, 2002 (age 24) Oley, Pennsylvania, U.S.

Sport
- Sport: Field hockey
- Position: Forward
- Club: X–Calibur
National team
Years	Team	Caps	Goals
2024–	United States	5	(1)
Medal record
Women's field hockey
Representing United States
Pan American Cup
Silver medal – second place	2025 Montevideo

Sophia Elizabeth "Phia" Gladieux (/ˈɡlædioʊ/ GLAD-ee-oh; born June 14, 2002) is an American field hockey player.

In 2024, she represented the United States at the XXXIII Olympic Games in France.

== Personal life ==
Sophia Gladieux was born on June 14, 2002, in Oley, Pennsylvania.

She is a graduate of Penn State.

== Career ==
=== National team ===
Gladieux was elevated to the national squad in 2024. She made her international debut later that year, earning her first senior cap against Belgium during season five of the FIH Pro League. In June, she was named in the Team USA squad for the XXXIII Olympic Games in Paris.

=== International goals ===
Goal	Date	Location	Opponent	Score	Result	Competition	Ref.
1	June 1, 2024	Lee Valley Hockey Stadium, London, England	Great Britain	2–3	2–3	2023–24 FIH Pro League	

== See also ==
- List of Pennsylvania State University Olympians
