= Nathalie Kubalski =

German field hockey player

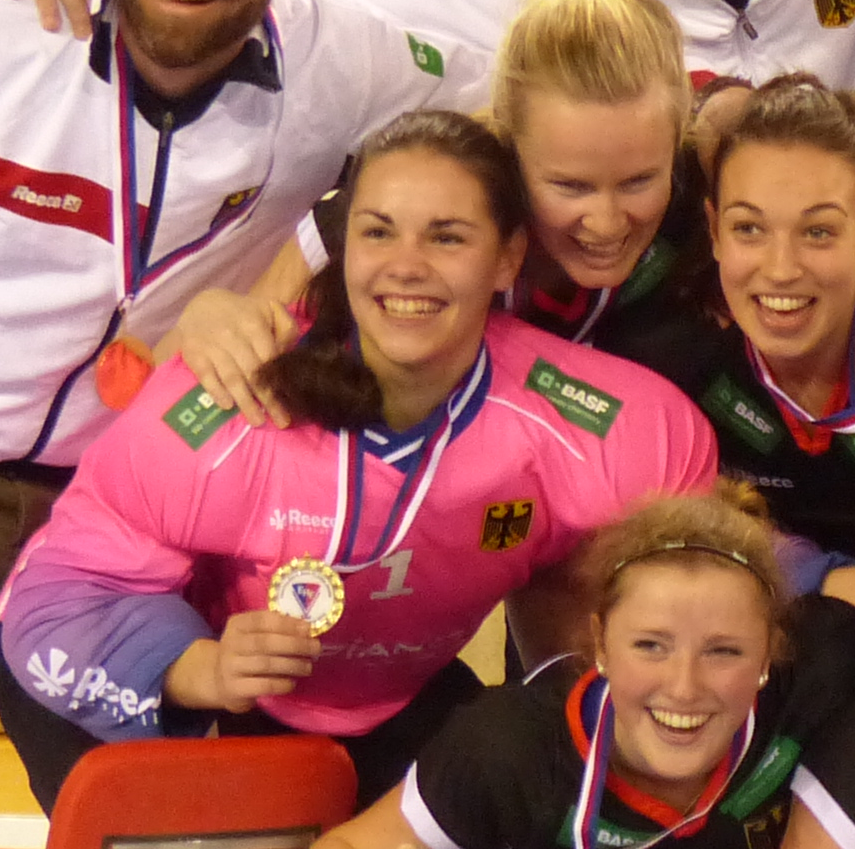
- The winning team 2018 Women's EuroHockey Indoor Nations Championship in Prague

Personal information
- Born: 3 September 1993 (age 33)

Sport
- Sport: Field hockey
- Position: Goalkeeper
- Club: Düsseldorfer HC
National team
Years	Team	Caps	Goals
2018–	Germany	7	(0)
Medal record
European Championship
Silver medal – second place	2019 Antwerp
Silver medal – second place	2021 Amstelveen
Silver medal – second place	2025 Mönchengladbach

Nathalie Kubalski (born 3 September 1993) is a German field hockey player for the German national team.

== Life ==
She participated at the 2018 Women's Hockey World Cup. Kubalski outed herself as a lesbian sportswoman.
