= Alexandra Hammel =

American field hockey player

Ally Hammel
Personal information
- Born: June 16, 1996 (age 30) Duxbury, Massachusetts, U.S.
- Height: 5 ft 4 in (163 cm)

Sport
- Sport: Field hockey
- Position: Defender
Senior career
Years	Team	Caps	Goals
2015–2018	Boston University Terriers	-	-
National team
Years	Team	Caps	Goals
2020–	United States	50	(1)
Medal record
Women's field hockey
Representing United States
Pan American Games
Silver medal – second place	2023 Santiago	Team
FIH Olympic Qualifiers
Silver medal – second place	2024 Ranchi	Team

Alexandra "Ally" Hammel (/ˈhæməl/ HAM-əl; born June 16, 1996) is an American field hockey player who plays as a defender with the United States women's national field hockey team.

== Personal life ==
Ally Hammel was born June 16, 1996 in Duxbury, Massachusetts to David and Jennifer Hammel. She has two brothers: Jon and Matt. She attended Duxbury High School and Loomis Chaffee School before attending Boston University, where she studied health science at Sargent College.

== Career ==
=== Collegiate career ===
While attending Boston University, Hammel played with the school's field hockey team. In October 2015, she was named the Patriot League's Rookie of the Week. She was named the league's Defensive Player of the Week three times in 2016, twice in 2017, and twice in 2018.

In 2017 and 2018, Hammel played on the Preseason All-Patriot League Team and was named the pre-season Defensive Player of the Year both years. In the main seasons, she was named to the Patriot League All-Tournament Team, All-Patriot League First Team, National Field Hockey Coaches Association (NFHCA) All-Northeast Region First Team, and NFHCA All-America First Team. She was honored as the Patriot League Defensive Player of the Year and NFHCA Northeast Region Player of the Year both years. In August 2018, she was named Longstreth/NFHCA Division I Defensive Player of the Week, as the Most Outstanding Player at the Patriot League Championship and NFHCA Senior Game.

=== National career ===
Hammel joined the U.S. Women's National Development Squad in 2018 for the Chile Tour and in 2019 for the Netherlands Tour. She joined the United States women's national field hockey team in May 2019 and was officially named to the team in January 2019.

=== International career ===
Hammel made her senior international debut with the United States women's national field hockey team in 2020 during season two of the FIH Pro League.

In 2023, she won her first medal with the national team, taking home silver at the 2023 Pan American Games in Santiago.

She has been named in the squad for the 2024 FIH Olympic Qualifiers in Ranchi.
