= Elizabeth Yeager =

American field hockey player

Beth Yeager
Personal information
- Full name: Elizabeth Doyle Yeager
- Born: June 17, 2003 (age 23) Greenwich, Connecticut, U.S.
- Height: 5 ft 8 in (173 cm)

Sport
- Sport: Field hockey
- Position: Midfield
- Club: WC Eagles
National team
Years	Team	Caps	Goals
2019–	United States Indoor	10	(7)
2021–	United States	4	(0)
Medal record
Women's field hockey
Representing United States
Pan American Cup
Silver medal – second place	2025 Montevideo
Women's indoor hockey
Indoor Pan American Cup
Gold medal – first place	2021 Spring City

Elizabeth Doyle "Beth" Yeager (born June 17, 2003) is an American indoor and field hockey player, who plays as a midfielder.

== Personal life ==
Yeager was born and raised in Greenwich, Connecticut. She attended Sacred Heart Greenwich for all of her school years, from 2008 to 2021.

She is a student at Princeton University.

== Career ==
=== Club hockey ===
Yeager is a current player for the WC Eagles hockey team.

=== Indoor ===
In 2019, Yeager made her first appearance for the United States Indoor team, during a test series against Croatia in Sveti Ivan Zelina. She then went on to represent the team at the Indoor Croatia Cup, where she won a gold medal.

Yeager won her second gold medal with the USA Indoor team in 2021, at the Indoor Pan American Cup in Spring City.

=== Senior national team ===
Yeager made her senior debut for the United States in 2021, during the 2020–21 FIH Pro League.
