= Meredith Sholder =

American field hockey player (born 1999)

Personal information
- Born: February 27, 1999 (age 27) Fleetwood, Pennsylvania, U.S.
- Height: 5 ft 8 in (172 cm)

Sport
- Sport: Field hockey
- Position: Midfield/Forward
National team
Years	Team	Caps	Goals
2022–	United States	44	(1)
Medal record
Women's field hockey
Representing United States
Pan American Games
Silver medal – second place	2023 Santiago	Team
Pan American Cup
Silver medal – second place	2025 Montevideo

Meredith Sholder (/ˈʃoʊldər/ SHOHL-dər; born February 27, 1999) is an American field hockey player, who plays as a midfielder and forward.

== Personal life ==
Meredith Sholder was born in Fleetwood, Pennsylvania and raised in Alburtis, Pennsylvania.

Sholder is a former student of the University of North Carolina.

== Career ==
=== Senior national team ===
Sholder made her senior international debut in 2022 during season three of the FIH Pro League.

In 2023 Sholder won her first medal with the national team, taking home silver at the 2023 Pan American Games in Santiago.

She has been named in the squad for the 2024 FIH Olympic Qualifiers in Ranchi.
