= Kelee Lepage =

American field hockey player

Personal information
- Born: October 4, 1997 (age 28)

Sport
- Sport: Field hockey
Medal record
Women's field hockey
Representing United States
FIH Olympic Qualifiers
Silver medal – second place	2024 Ranchi	Team

Kelee Lepage (/ˈkɛli/ KEL-ee; born October 4, 1997) is an American field hockey player. She represented the United States at the 2024 Summer Olympics.
