= Sanne Caarls =

American field hockey player

Personal information
- Full name: Sanne Margaret Elisabeth Caarls
- Born: March 16, 1998 (age 28) Nieuw-Vennep, Netherlands

Sport
- Sport: Field hockey
- Position: Midfielder
Senior career
Years	Team	Caps	Goals
–	HC Bloemendaal	-	-
National team
Years	Team	Caps	Goals
2022–	United States	51	(255)
Medal record
Women's field hockey
Representing United States
Pan American Games
Silver medal – second place	2023 Santiago	Team
Pan American Cup
Silver medal – second place	2025 Montevideo

Sanne Margaret Elisabeth Caarls (born March 16, 1998) is a Dutch born–American field hockey player.

== Personal life ==
Sanne Caarls was born in the Netherlands and grew up in the town Nieuw-Vennep. She was born to a Dutch father and an American mother.

== Career ==
=== National team ===
Following months of training with the Dutch development squad, Caarls made the move to the United States to represent her mother's home country. She made her debut for the national team during season three of the FIH Pro League against her home nation, the Netherlands.

In 2023 Caarls was officially added to the national squad, and named in the team for season four of the FIH Pro League.
