= Emma DeBerdine =

American field hockey player

Personal information
- Born: June 14, 2001 (age 25) Millersville, Pennsylvania, U.S.

Sport
- Sport: Field hockey
- Position: Midfield
National team
Years	Team	Caps	Goals
2021–2022	United States U–22	10	(0)
2023–	United States	24	(0)
Medal record
Women's field hockey
Representing United States
Pan American Games
Silver medal – second place	2023 Santiago	Team
Pan American Cup
Silver medal – second place	2025 Montevideo
Pan American Junior Championship
Bronze medal – third place	2021 Santiago

Emma DeBerdine (/dəˈbɜːrdaɪn/ də-BUR-dyne; born June 14, 2001) is an American field hockey player, who plays as a midfielder.

== Personal life ==
Emma DeBerdine was born in Millersville, Pennsylvania. Her sister, Brooke, also represents the US in field hockey.

DeBerdine is a student of the University of Maryland.

== Career ==
=== Under–22 ===
DeBerdine made her debut for the United States U–22 side at the 2021 Pan American Junior Championship in Santiago, where she won a bronze medal.

She also represented the team at the 2022 FIH Junior World Cup in Potchefstroom.

=== Senior national team ===
DeBerdine made her senior international debut in 2023 during season four of the FIH Pro League.

In 2023, DeBerdine won her first medal with the national team, taking home silver at the 2023 Pan American Games in Santiago.

She has been named in the squad for the 2024 FIH Olympic Qualifiers in Ranchi.
