= Madeleine Zimmer =

American field hockey player

Maddie Zimmer
Personal information
- Full name: Madeleine Zimmer
- Born: September 28, 2001 (age 25) Owatonna, Minnesota, U.S.
- Height: 5 ft 5 in (165 cm)

Sport
- Sport: Field hockey
- Position: Midfield / forward
Youth career
- Team
- –: Alley Cats
Senior career
Years	Team	Caps	Goals
2020–2025	Northwestern Wildcats	-	-
National team
Years	Team	Caps	Goals
2019	United States U–21	2	(2)
2019–	United States	86	(8)
Medal record
Women's field hockey
Representing United States
Pan American Cup
Silver medal – second place	2025 Montevideo

Madeleine "Maddie" Zimmer (born September 28, 2001) is an American field hockey player, who plays as a midfielder and forward. She competes for the United States women's national team.

She played for the United States at the 2024 Summer Olympics in Paris, where the team finished 9th.

At Northwestern University she won NCAA Division I championships in 2021, 2024 and 2025 and was named NCAA Tournament Most Outstanding Player in each of those seasons.

She was the National Field Hockey Coaches Association Division I National Player of the Year in 2024 and 2025 and won the Honda Sports Award for field hockey both years.

== Personal life ==
Zimmer was born in Owatonna, Minnesota and raised in Hershey, Pennsylvania. She attended Hershey High School, where she played field hockey and lacrosse. In 2018 she helped Hershey win the Pennsylvania Class 3A state championship. A torn anterior cruciate ligament in her left knee ended her senior year high school field hockey season in 2019. She was a three-time Pennsylvania all-state selection and a three-time Max Field Hockey All-American. She is the daughter of Scott and Erin Zimmer and has a brother, Ben. Her mother was an All-American in both field hockey and lacrosse at the College of William & Mary. Zimmer enrolled at Northwestern University in 2020 and later completed graduate study there.

== Career ==
=== Club hockey ===
Zimmer is a former player for the Alley Cats hockey team.

=== College ===
Zimmer played midfield for the Northwestern Wildcats from the 2020–21 season through 2025. She redshirted the 2023 season to train with the United States national team ahead of the 2024 Summer Olympics.

In 2020–21 she was named Big Ten Freshman of the Year and an NFHCA Third Team All-American after recording four goals and one assist.

In 2021 she recorded nine goals and three assists and was named to the All-Big Ten first team and NFHCA All-America first team. Northwestern won the 2021 NCAA Division I championship, and Zimmer was named the tournament's Most Outstanding Player.

In 2022 she started 23 games and recorded two goals and one assist. She repeated as a first-team All-American and first-team All-Big Ten selection as Northwestern reached the NCAA Division I Championship game.

She did not play a collegiate season in 2023 while training for the 2024 Summer Olympics.

In 2024 Zimmer served as team captain, started all 24 games, and recorded 10 goals and 12 assists for 32 points. Northwestern finished 23–1 and defeated Saint Joseph's 5–0 in the NCAA Division I championship game. Zimmer scored two goals in the final and was named the tournament's Most Outstanding Player for a second time. After the season she was named Big Ten Player of the Year, NFHCA West Region Player of the Year, NFHCA Division I Player of the Year, and the Honda Sport Award winner for field hockey.

In 2025, her graduate season, she played in all 23 games and recorded five goals and 17 assists for 27 points. Northwestern won the 2025 NCAA Division I Championship, defeating Princeton 2–1 in double overtime. Associated Press reported that Ilse Tromp scored the winning goal by deflecting a shot from Zimmer. Zimmer was named the tournament's Most Outstanding player for a third time. She repeated as Big Ten Player of the Year, NFHCA West Region Player of the Year, NFHCA Division I National Player of the Year, and Honda Sport Award Winner.

=== Junior national team ===
Zimmer made her debut for the United States U–21 team in 2019, during a test series against Germany, held in Viersen and Mönchengladbach.

She later played at the 2021 Pan American Junior Championship in Santiago, where the United States won the bronze medal.

She also represented the United States at the under-17 level in 2017 and 2018.

=== Senior national team ===
Following her debut for the junior national team, Zimmer made her senior debut later that year during a test series against Canada in Lancaster. She earned her first senior cap on September 27, 2019, against Canada.

She won a silver medal with the United States at the 2023 Pan American Games in Santiago.

USA Field Hockey listed her 50th cap on May 26, 2024, against Belgium.

At the 2024 FIH Hockey Olympic Qualifier in Ranchi, India, the United States finished second and qualified for the 2024 Summer Olympic Games.

She was named to the United States roster for the 2024 Summer Olympics and played in Paris. The United States finished ninth.

She won a silver medal at the 2025 Pan American Cup in Montevideo.

The United States finished fourth at the 2025 FIH Hockey Nations Cup in Santiago with Zimmer an active member of the squad.

In June 2026 she won a bronze medal with the United States at the FIH Hockey Nations Cup in Auckland.

She competed at the 2026 FIH Hockey World Cup in Belgium and the Netherlands, where the United States finished tenth.

As of August 27, 2026, the International Hockey Federation listed Zimmer with 86 senior caps and 8 goals.
