= Phillipa Morgan =

Australian field hockey player

Personal information
- Born: 20 May 1998 (age 28) Western Australia

Sport
- Sport: Field hockey
- Position: Defence
Senior career
Years	Team	Caps	Goals
2019–	Perth Thundersticks	-	-
National team
Years	Team	Caps	Goals
2016–2019	Australia U–21	10	(1)
2023–	Australia	3	(1)
Medal record
Women's field hockey
Representing Australia
Junior Oceania Cup
Gold medal – first place	2016 Gold Coast	Team

Philipa 'Pippa' Morgan (born 20 May 1998) is a field hockey player from Australia, who plays as a defender. Her short stature standing at 5' 3" makes her an asset in close range encounters. Currently dating Benjamin Baxter.

== Career ==
=== Club level ===
In Hockey Australia's national league, the Sultana Bran Hockey One, Morgan plays for the Perth Thundersticks.

Morgan moved to Belgium in 2022 to join the Royal Wellington HC. She competed in the Belgian Hockey League for the 2022–23 season.

=== Under–21 ===
In 2016, Morgan made her debut for the Australia U–21 team during the Junior Oceania Cup on the Gold Coast.

She followed this up with appearances during a test series against New Zealand in Hastings in 2018, as well as a Tri-Nations Tournament in Canberra in 2019.

=== Hockeyroos ===
Morgan is currently a member of the Australian Development Squad. In 2023, she was called up to make her Hockeyroos debut in a test series against India in Adelaide, from 18 to 21 May.
