= Emma Findlay =

New Zealand field hockey player

Personal information
- Born: 22 April 2004 (age 22) Napier, New Zealand

Sport
- Sport: Field hockey
- Position: Midfield
Senior career
Years	Team	Caps	Goals
2023–	Hawke's Bay	-	-
2024–	Reading	-	-
National team
Years	Team	Caps	Goals
2022–	New Zealand U–21	12	(1)
2023–	New Zealand	21	(1)
Medal record
Women's field hockey
Representing New Zealand
FIH Nations Cup
Gold medal – first place	2024–25 Santiago
Junior Oceania Cup
Silver medal – second place	2022 Canberra
Silver medal – second place	2025 Auckland

Emma Findlay (born 22 April 2004) is a field hockey player from New Zealand.

== Personal life ==
Findlay was born and raised in Napier, New Zealand, and was educated at Taradale High School. Her brother, Sean, also plays field hockey for New Zealand. His twins sister Greer and Hannah are also international hockey players at 2025 Junior Oceania Cup.

== Career ==
=== Under–21 ===
Findlay made her international debut for New Zealand at Under–21 level. She represented the junior squad at the 2022 Junior Oceania Cup in Canberra, where she won a silver medal.

In 2023 she was named in the squad again, also receiving a call–up for the FIH Junior World Cup in Santiago, Chile.

=== Black Sticks ===
In 2023, Findlay received her first call up to the senior national team. She made her Black Sticks debut during season four of the FIH Pro League.

At the end of the 2024 season, she joined Reading Hockey Club. During the 2024–25 Women's England Hockey League season she was part of the Reading team that won the league title.
