= Bianca Zurrer =

Australian field hockey player (born 2006)

Personal information
- Born: 22 January 2006 (age 20) Warragul, Australia

Sport
- Sport: Field hockey
- Position: Midfield
Senior career
Years	Team	Caps	Goals
2024–	HC Melbourne	8	0
National team
Years	Team	Caps	Goals
2025–	Australia U–21	22	(0)
2026–	Australia	3	(0)
Medal record
Women's field hockey
Representing Australia
Junior Oceania Cup
Gold medal – first place	2025 Auckland
Gold medal – first place	2026 Redcliffe

Bianca Zurrer (born 22 January 2006) is a field hockey player from Australia.

She was named in Hockey Australia's inaugural Talent Accelerator 2032, recognising her as one of the most promising junior players with a dedicated pathway to lead into the XXXV Summer Olympics in Brisbane.

== Personal life ==
Zurrer grew up in the Gippsland region of Victoria.

She is a scholarship holder at the VIS.

== Career ==
=== Domestic hockey ===
At domestic level, Zurrer competes in the ONE Active Hockey One League for HC Melbourne.

=== Under–21 ===
In 2025 Zurrer made her debut for the Australian U–21 team, the Jillaroos. She was a member of the gold medal winning squad at the Junior Oceania Cup in Auckland. She continued to represent the team throughout the year, travelling to Europe to play in a Four–Nations Tournament in Germany, appearing in a test series against India in Canberra, and competing at the FIH Junior World Cup in Santiago.

She appeared at her second Junior Oceania Cup in 2026 at the tournament held in Redcliffe, where she won a gold medal.

=== Hockeyroos ===
She made her senior international debut in 2026, being called into the national squad for the FIH Pro League. She earned her first cap in a match against Spain in Hobart.
