= Madeleine Murphy =

Australian field hockey player

Personal information
- Born: 30 July 1997 (age 29) Riana, Tasmania

Sport
- Sport: Field hockey
- Position: Midfield
National team
| Years | Team | Caps | Goals |
| 2015– | Australia Indoor | 12 | (4) |
| 2016 | Australia U–21 | 3 | (1) |
Medal record
Women's field hockey
Representing Australia
Junior Oceania Cup
| Gold medal – first place | 2016 Gold Coast | Team |

Madeleine Murphy (born 30 July 1997) is an indoor and field hockey player from Australia.

== Personal life ==
Madeleine Murphy was born and raised in Riana, Tasmania.

== Career ==
=== Indoor hockey ===
Murphy has represented the Australian indoor team on numerous occasions. She made her debut in 2015 during an invitational tournament in Durban. She also appeared at the FIH Indoor World Cup in Berlin.

In 2023 she was named in the Australian squad for her second FIH Indoor World Cup in Pretoria.

=== Field hockey ===
==== Domestic league ====
In Hockey Australia's domestic league, the Sultana Bran Hockey One, Murphy captains the Tassie Tigers.

==== Jillaroos ====
Murphy was a member of the Jillaroos squad that won gold at the 2016 Junior Oceania Cup on the Gold Coast.
