= Anna Crowley =

New Zealand field hockey player

Personal information
- Born: 8 February 2000 (age 26) New Plymouth, New Zealand
- Relatives: Kieran Crowley (uncle); Casey Crowley (cousin)
- Field hockey career
- Sport: Field hockey
- Position: Defence
Senior career
Years	Team	Caps	Goals
2022–	Wellington	-	-
2024–	Reading	-	-
National team
Years	Team	Caps	Goals
2022–	New Zealand U–21	3	(0)
2022–	New Zealand	23	(0)
Medal record
Women's field hockey
Representing New Zealand
FIH Nations Cup
Gold medal – first place	2024–25 Santiago

Anna Crowley (born 8 February 2000) is a New Zealand field hockey player.

== Personal life ==
Crowley was born on 8 February 2000 in New Plymouth, and grew up there. She is the daughter of Alan Crowley, who played representative rugby union for Taranaki, the niece of rugby union coach and former player Kieran Crowley, and the cousin of Casey Crowley, who is also a member of the Black Sticks.

== Career ==
=== Under–21 ===
Crowley made her international debut for New Zealand at Under–21 level. She represented the junior squad in a 2019 Tri–Nations Tournament in Canberra.

=== Black Sticks ===
In 2021, Crowley received her first call up to the national squad.

Due to the COVID-19 pandemic, Crowley was unable to make her debut for the national team in 2021. She was named in the national squad again in 2022, which eventually lead to her international debut. She made her first international appearance against Australia during the Trans–Tasman Series in Auckland. Following her debut, Crowley was named in the squads for the FIH World Cup in Terrassa and Amsterdam, as well as the Commonwealth Games in Birmingham.

Crowley continued representing the Black Sticks into 2023, appearing during season four of the FIH Pro League.

At the end of the 2024 season, she joined Reading Hockey Club. During the 2024–25 Women's England Hockey League season she was part of the Reading team that won the league title.
