= Casey Crowley =

New Zealand field hockey player

Personal information
- Born: 21 January 1998 (age 28) New Plymouth, New Zealand
- Height: 1.67 m (5 ft 6 in)
- Relatives: Kieran Crowley (father); Anna Crowley (cousin)
- Field hockey career
- Sport: Field hockey
- Position: Midfield
Senior career
Years	Team	Caps	Goals
–	North Harbour	-	-
National team
Years	Team	Caps	Goals
2019	New Zealand U–21	4	(0)
2022–	New Zealand	38	(0)
Medal record
Women's field hockey
Representing New Zealand
Oceania Cup
Silver medal – second place	2023 Whangārei
FIH Nations Cup
Gold medal – first place	2024–25 Santiago

Casey Crowley (born 21 January 1998) is a New Zealand field hockey player.

== Personal life ==
Crowley was born in New Plymouth on 21 January 1998, the daughter of rugby union coach and former player Kieran Crowley. Her cousin, Anna Crowley, is also a member of the Black Sticks.

She attended the University of Maine.

== Career ==
=== Under–21 ===
Crowley made her international debut for New Zealand at Under–21 level. She represented the junior squad at a 2019 Tri–Nations Tournament in Canberra.

=== Black Sticks ===
Due to the COVID-19 pandemic, Crowley did not make her senior international debut until 2022. She made her first appearance for the Black Sticks at the Trans–Tasman Series in Auckland.

Since her debut she has been a mainstay in the national squad. She made appearances in season three of the FIH Pro League and won a silver medal at the Oceania Cup in Whangārei.

She has been named in the squad for the 2024 FIH Olympic Qualifiers in Ranchi.
