= 2011 Women's Hockey Under-21 Four Nations Tournament =

Invitational women's under–21 field hockey competition

2011 Women's Hockey Under–21 Four Nations Tournament
Tournament details
- Host country: India
- City: New Delhi
- Dates: 8–12 November
- Teams: 4
- Venue: Major Dhyan Chand National Stadium

Final positions
- Champions: Germany
- Runner-up: New Zealand
- Third place: India

Tournament statistics
- Matches played: 8
- Goals scored: 35 (4.38 per match)
- Top scorer: (New Zealand) Sian Fremaux (5 goals)
- Best player: (New Zealand) Sian Fremaux

The 2011 Women's Hockey Under–21 Four Nations Tournament was an invitational women's under–21 field hockey competition, hosted by Hockey India. The tournament took place between 8–12 November 2011 in New Delhi, India. A total of four teams competed for the title.

Germany won the tournament, defeating New Zealand 3–2 during golden goal in the final. India finished in third place after a 3–2 win over Australia.

== Teams ==
Including India, 4 teams were invited by Hockey India to participate in the tournament.

- Australia
- Germany
- India (host nation)
- New Zealand

== Officials ==
The following umpires were appointed by the International Hockey Federation to officiate the tournament:

- Sarah Allanson (AUS)
- Vilma Bagdanskiene (LTU)
- Suman Leta Chumbak (IND)
- Amber Church (NZL)
- Sandra Wagner (GER)

== Results ==
All times are local (UTC+05:30).

=== Preliminary round ===
Pos	Team	Pld	W	D	L	GF	GA	GD	Pts	Qualification
1	New Zealand	3	2	0	1	11	7	+4	6	Advanced to Final
2	Germany	3	2	0	1	7	8	−1	6	Advanced to Final
3	India (H)	3	1	1	1	4	4	0	4	
4	Australia	3	0	1	2	3	6	−3	1	

Source: Deutscher Hockey-Bund
Rules for classification: 1) points; 2) goal difference; 3) games won; 4) head-to-head result.
(H) Hosts

==== Fixtures ====
8 November 2011
19:00

Australia	1–3	Germany
Padget 41'	Report	Grote 2', 46'; Keim 70'

Umpires:
Amber Church (NZL)
Suman Leta Chumbak (IND)

8 November 2011
21:00

India	3–2	New Zealand
Barla 8'; Anju 13'; Poonam 68'	Report	Fremaux 12'; Hall 43'

Umpires:
Sandra Wagner (GER)
Vilma Bagdanskiene (LTU)

9 November 2011
19:00

Germany	2–6	New Zealand
Krauss 4', 35'	Report	Hayward 7'; Fremaux 10', 13', 48'; Dennison 14'; Hall 65'

Umpires:
Sarah Allanson (AUS)
Suman Leta Chumbak (IND)

9 November 2011
21:00

Australia	0–0	India
	Report

Umpires:
Vilma Bagdanskiene (LTU)
Amber Church (NZL)

11 November 2011
19:00

New Zealand	3–2	Australia
Cotton 18', 19'; Fremaux 52'	Report	Peris 20'; Squibb 55'

Umpires:
Sandra Wagner (GER)
Vilma Bagdanskiene (LTU)

11 November 2011
21:00

India	1–2	Germany
Jaspreet 7'	Report	Saenger 35', 37'

Umpires:
Amber Church (NZL)
Sarah Allanson (AUS)

=== Classification round ===
==== Third and fourth place ====
12 November 2011
17:00

India	3–2	Australia
Poonam 37'; Anupa 42', 65'	Report	Peris 32'; Gilmore 41'

Umpires:
Vilma Bagdanskiene (LTU)
Sandra Wagner (GER)

==== Final ====
12 November 2011
19:30

New Zealand	2–3 (a.e.t.)	Germany
Hayward 33'; King 42'	Report	Scharf 10', 43'; Mayen 74'

Umpires:
Suman Leta Chumbak (IND)
Sarah Allanson (AUS)

== Awards ==
Player of the Tournament	Top Goalscorer	Player of the Final
(New Zealand) Sian Fremaux	(New Zealand) Sian Fremaux	(Germany) Sophie Mayen

== Statistics ==
=== Final standings ===
Pos	Team	Pld	W	D	L	GF	GA	GD	Pts	Result
1st place, gold medalist(s)	Germany	4	3	0	1	10	10	0	9	Tournament Champion
2nd place, silver medalist(s)	New Zealand	4	2	0	2	13	10	+3	6	
3rd place, bronze medalist(s)	India (H)	4	2	1	1	7	6	+1	7	
4	Australia	4	0	1	3	5	9	−4	1	

Source: Deutscher Hockey-Bund
(H) Hosts

=== Goalscorers ===
There were 35 goals scored in 8 matches, for an average of 4.38 goals per match.

5 goals

- (New Zealand) Sian Fremaux

3 goals

- (India) Anupa Barla

2 goals

- (Australia) Brooke Peris
- (Germany) Rebecca Grote
- (Germany) Marilena Krauss
- (Germany) Laura Saenger
- (Germany) Viola Scharf
- (India) Poonam Rani
- (New Zealand) Natasha Cotton
- (New Zealand) Tara Hall
- (New Zealand) Pippa Hayward

1 goal

- (Australia) Kate Gilmore
- (Australia) Hayley Padget
- (Australia) Penny Squibb
- (Germany) Lisa Keim
- (Germany) Sophie Mayen
- (India) Anju Dhiman
- (India) Jaspreet Kaur
- (New Zealand) Rhiannon Dennison
- (New Zealand) Julia King
