= 2008 Junior Oceania Cup =

Field hockey tournament in Australia

Tournament details
- Host country: Australia
- City: Brisbane
- Dates: 11–14 December
- Venue: Queensland Hockey Centre

The 2008 Junior Oceania Cup was an international field hockey tournament hosted by Australia. The quadrennial tournament serves as the Junior Championship of Oceania organized by the Oceania Hockey Federation. It was held in Brisbane, Queensland, Australia between 11 and 14 December 2008.

Australia and New Zealand were the only participating teams.

Australia won the tournament in both the men's and women's competitions. The tournament also served as a qualifier for the 2009 men's and women's Junior World Cups, with both Australia and New Zealand qualifying.

== Men's tournament ==
Men's Tournament
- Teams: 2 (from 1 confederation)

Final positions
- Champions: Australia (2nd title)
- Runner-up: New Zealand

Tournament statistics
- Matches played: 3
- Goals scored: 21 (7 per match)
- Top scorer: (Australia) Timothy Bates (5 goals)

=== Results ===
All times are local (UTC+10).

==== Pool ====
Pos	Team	Pld	W	D	L	GF	GA	GD	Pts	Qualification
1	Australia (H)	3	2	1	0	13	8	+5	7	Junior World Cup
2	New Zealand	3	0	1	2	8	13	−5	1	Junior World Cup

Source: Clearing House
Rules for classification: 1) points; 2) matches won; 3) goal difference; 4) goals for; 5) head-to-head result; 6) field goals scored.
(H) Hosts

==== Matches ====
11 December 2008
20:00

Australia	5–2	New Zealand
Ellis 17'; Govers 19'; T. Bates 28', 31', 68'	Report	Hilton 6'; Staples 39'

Umpires:
Satoshi Kondo (JPN)
Sagayanathan Ambrose (MAS)

13 December 2008
14:00

Australia	4–4	New Zealand
T. Bates 21', 39'; Kleinschmidt 23'; Pollard 45'	Report	Jenness 1', 41'; Child 37'; Hilton 53'

Umpires:
Sagayanathan Ambrose (MAS)
Satoshi Kondo (JPN)

14 December 2008
16:30

Australia	4–2	New Zealand
M. Bates 2', 40', 69'; Kleinschmidt 58'	Report	Hilton 32'; Child 58'

Umpires:
Satoshi Kondo (JPN)
Sagayanathan Ambrose (MAS)

== Women's tournament ==
Women's Tournament
- Teams: 2 (from 1 confederation)

Final positions
- Champions: Australia (3rd title)
- Runner-up: New Zealand

Tournament statistics
- Matches played: 3
- Goals scored: 14 (4.67 per match)
- Top scorer: (Australia) Jemma Buckley (4 goals)

=== Results ===
All times are local (UTC+10).

==== Pool ====
Pos	Team	Pld	W	D	L	GF	GA	GD	Pts	Qualification
1	Australia (H)	3	2	0	1	9	5	+4	6	Junior World Cup
2	New Zealand	3	1	0	2	5	9	−4	3	Junior World Cup

Source: Clearing House
Rules for classification: 1) points; 2) matches won; 3) goal difference; 4) goals for; 5) head-to-head result; 6) field goals scored.
(H) Hosts

==== Matches ====
11 December 2008
18:00

Australia	4–1	New Zealand
Hurtz 17'; Buckley 23', 61'; Bruce 56'	Report	Michelsen 45'

Umpires:
Hong Chen (CHN)
Sunita Pant (IND)

13 December 2008
16:00

Australia	2–3	New Zealand
Buckley 7'; Flanagan 50'	Report	Finlayson 16', 52'; Harrison 31'

Umpires:
Sunita Pant (IND)
Hong Chen (CHN)

14 December 2008
14:00

Australia	3–1	New Zealand
Ciallella 8', 70'; Buckley 51'	Report	Glynn 5'

Umpires:
Hong Chen (CHN)
Sunita Pant (IND)
