= Zoe Newman =

Australian field hockey player (born 1999)

Personal information
- Full name: Zoe Elizabeth Newman
- Born: 28 July 1999 (age 27) Gymea, Australia

Sport
- Sport: Field hockey
- Position: Goalkeeper
Senior career
Years	Team	Caps	Goals
2022–2022	NSW Pride	-	-
2023–	Adelaide Fire	-	-
National team
Years	Team	Caps	Goals
2023–	Australia	21	(0)
Medal record
Women's field hockey
Representing Australia
Oceania Cup
Gold medal – first place	2023 Whangārei	Team
Silver medal – second place	2025 Darwin	Team

Zoe Elizabeth Newman (born 28 July 1999) is a field hockey player from Australia, who plays as a goalkeeper.

== Personal life ==
Zoe Newman was born and raised in Gymea, New South Wales.

== Career ==
=== National ===
At a national level, Newman has represented her home state at junior and senior level. In 2022 she was a member of the championship winning NSW Pride squad in Season Two of the Hockey One.

Newman has since signed with the Adelaide Fire for Season Three.

=== International ===
Following her strong performances in the Hockey One, Newman was called up to make her Hockeyroos debut in 2023. She made her first international appearance during Season Four of the FIH Pro League. Throughout the 2023 season, Newman represented the national team a number of times, most notably winning a gold medal at the Oceania Cup in Whangārei.
