= American Samoa Field Hockey Association =

Governing body of field hockey in American Samoa

The American Samoa Field Hockey Association is the governing body of field hockey in American Samoa, Oceania. Its headquarters are in Pago Pago, American Samoa. It is affiliated to IHF International Hockey Federation and OCF Oceania Hockey Federation.

== See also ==
Oceania Hockey Federation
