= 2025 Women's Junior Oceania Cup =

Field hockey tournament

Tournament details
- Host country: New Zealand
- City: Auckland
- Dates: 30 January – 2 February
- Teams: 2 (from 1 confederation)
- Venue: Lloyd Elsmore Park

Final positions
- Champions: Australia (7th title)
- Runner-up: New Zealand

Tournament statistics
- Matches played: 3
- Goals scored: 14 (4.67 per match)
- Top scorer(s): (Australia) Makayla Jones (Australia) Evie Stansby (New Zealand) Hannah Donald (2 goals)

The 2025 Women's Junior Oceania Cup was the seventh edition of the Junior Oceania Cup for women. The event was held at Lloyd Elsmore Park in Auckland, New Zealand from 30 January to 2 February 2025. For the first time since its inception, the tournament was due to comprise three national teams, meaning a round–robin format will be used. Prior to the tournament however, the Solomon Islands withdrew.

The tournament served as the Oceania qualifier for the 2025 FIH Junior World Cup to be held in Santiago, Chile. As the Oceania Hockey Federation receives three qualification quotas, both participating nations gained automatic qualification to the FIH Junior World Cup.

Australia won the tournament for the seventh consecutive time. They finished ahead of New Zealand on all tiebreakers at the conclusion of the test matches.

== Participating nations ==
The following national associations will participate in the tournament.

Australia

Head Coach: Stacia Strain

1. Saysha Pillay
2. Mihaylia Howell
4. Karissa van der Wath
5. Lola Dorman
6. Madeline Kenny (C)
7. Makayla Jones (C)
8. Samantha Love
9. Charlotte Hodgson
10. Josie Lawton (C)
11. Camryn Mathison
13. Amalia Patterson
16. Lauren Yee
17. Georgia Hiskins
21. Georgina West
22. Evie Stansby
23. Bianca Zurrer
26. Summer Greenway (GK)
27. Alyssa Smith (GK)
New Zealand

Head Coach: Verity Sharland

2. Emma Findlay (C)
3. Georgie Shotter
5. Riana Pho (C)
7. Greer Findlay
8. Emelia Surridge
9. Charlie Wills
10. Hannah Findlay
11. Emma Irwin
15. Lily Rushworth
16. Jodie Kent
17. Cara Morrison
18. Ella Leighton
19. Kaea Elliott
20. Arabelle McGuckin
21. Holly Hilton-Jones
23. Jayda Pawhau (GK)
24. Kate Fraser (GK)
25. Hannah Donald
Solomon Islands

Head Coach: Esmie Belo

1. Jimaemah Tilley
2. Lao Lengi
3. Grace Wateha'a
4. Jahlindey Eke
5. Joylyn Nelson
6. Rolyn Osimae
7. Miriam Bobby
8. Marie Laubua
9. Jenail Oruna
10. Leanna Roscal
11. Julia Ramdollar
12. Jaysi Reni
13. Mary Ngangale (GK)
14. Florence Otoa
15. Faithia Aruhane
16. Starin Laubua
17. Everlyn Kii
18. Gylender Mapuru
19. Marie Vabo

== Results ==
=== Standings ===
Pos	Team	Pld	W	D	L	GF	GA	GD	Pts	Qualification
1	Australia (C)	3	2	1	0	9	5	+4	7	2025 Junior World Cup
2	New Zealand (H)	3	0	1	2	5	9	−4	1	2025 Junior World Cup
3	Solomon Islands (Note: Solomon Islands withdrew before the start of the tournament.)	0	0	0	0	0	0	0	0	Withdrawn

Source: FIH
Rules for classification: 1) points; 2) goal difference; 3) goals scored; 4) head-to-head result.
(C) Champions; (H) Hosts

==== Fixtures ====
30 January 2025
16:00

New Zealand	1–3	Australia
Surridge 38'	Report	Van der Wath 3'; Howell 20'; Lawton 23'

Umpires:
Lani Nichol (NZL)
Cassidy Gallagher (AUS)

1 February 2025
16:00

Australia	4–2	New Zealand
Jones 13', 54'; Stansby 18', 37'	Report	Pho 30'; E. Findlay 56'

Umpires:
Cassidy Gallagher (AUS)
Lani Nichol (NZL)

2 February 2025
16:00

New Zealand	2–2	Australia
Donald 48', 55'	Report	Kenny 28'; West 33'

Umpires:
Lani Nichol (NZL)
Cassidy Gallagher (AUS)

== Goalscorers ==
There were 14 goals scored in 3 matches, for an average of 4.67 goals per match.

2 goals

- (Australia) Makayla Jones
- (Australia) Evie Stansby
- (New Zealand) Hannah Donald

1 goal

- (Australia) Mihaylia Howell
- (Australia) Madeline Kenny
- (Australia) Josie Lawton
- (Australia) Karissa van der Wath
- (Australia) Georgina West
- (New Zealand) Emma Findlay
- (New Zealand) Riana Pho
- (New Zealand) Emelia Surridge

Source: FIH
