= 2000 Junior Oceania Cup =

International field hockey tournament hosted by Australia

Tournament details
- Host country: Australia
- City: Canberra
- Dates: 30 March – 2 April
- Teams: 2
- Venue: National Hockey Centre

Final positions
- Champions: Australia (1st title)
- Runner-up: New Zealand

Tournament statistics
- Matches played: 3
- Goals scored: 9 (3 per match)
- Top scorer(s): (Australia) Emily Halliday (Australia) Suzanne Faulkner (2 goals)

The 2000 Junior Oceania Cup was an international field hockey tournament hosted by Australia. The quadrennial tournament serves as the Junior Championship of Oceania, organized by the Oceania Hockey Federation. It was held in Canberra, Australia, between 30 March and 2 April 2000.

Australia won the tournament, finishing the pool stage with two wins and one draw. The win guaranteed the team qualification to the 2001 FIH Junior World Cup in Buenos Aires.

== Results ==
All times are local (AEDT).

=== Pool ===
Pos	Team	Pld	W	D	L	GF	GA	GD	Pts	Qualification
1	Australia (H)	3	2	1	0	6	3	+3	7	FIH Junior World Cup
2	New Zealand	3	0	1	2	3	6	−3	1	

Source: Clearing House
Rules for classification: 1) points; 2) matches won; 3) goal difference; 4) goals for; 5) head-to-head result; 6) field goals scored.
(H) Hosts

=== Fixtures ===
30 March 2000
18:30

Australia	0–0	New Zealand
	Report

Umpires:
Judith Barnesby (AUS)
Lyn Farrell (NZL)

1 April 2000
12:45

Australia	2–0	New Zealand
Alcorn 47'; Faulkner 60'	Report

Umpires:
Lyn Farrell (NZL)
Judith Barnesby (AUS)

2 April 2000
12:45

Australia	4–3	New Zealand
Halliday 3', 43'; Ballard 51'; Faulkner 58'	Report	Ross 8'; Walker 21'; Igasan 62'

Umpires:
Judith Barnesby (AUS)
Lyn Farrell (NZL)
