= 2013 Junior Oceania Cup =

Field hockey tournament

Tournament details
- Host country: Australia
- City: Gold Coast
- Dates: 27 February–3 March
- Venue: Keith Hunt Park

The 2013 Junior Oceania Cup was an international field hockey tournament hosted by Australia. The quadrennial tournament serves as the Junior Championship of Oceania organized by the Oceania Hockey Federation. It was held in Gold Coast, Queensland, Australia between 27 February and 3 March 2008.

Host nation Australia was joined by teams from, New Zealand, Papua New Guinea and Vanuatu.

Australia won the tournament in both the men's and women's competitions. The tournament also served as a qualifier for the 2013 men's and women's Junior World Cups, with both Australia and New Zealand qualifying to both.

== Men's tournament ==
Men's Tournament
- Teams: 4 (from 1 confederation)

Final positions
- Champions: Australia (3rd title)
- Runner-up: New Zealand
- Third place: Vanuatu

Tournament statistics
- Matches played: 6
- Goals scored: 62 (10.33 per match)
- Top scorer: (Australia) Justin Douglas (11 goals)

=== Results ===
All times are local (UTC+10).

==== Pool Stage ====
Pos	Team	Pld	W	D	L	GF	GA	GD	Pts	Qualification
1	Australia (H)	2	2	0	0	32	2	+30	6	Final and Junior World Cup
2	New Zealand	2	1	0	1	17	4	+13	3	Final and Junior World Cup
3	Papua New Guinea	2	1	0	1	3	16	−13	3	
4	Vanuatu	2	0	0	2	1	31	−30	0	

Source: Hockey Australia
Rules for classification: 1) points; 2) matches won; 3) goal difference; 4) goals for; 5) head-to-head result; 6) field goals scored.
(H) Hosts

27 February 2013
12:00

New Zealand	15–0	Papua New Guinea
Ritchie 3 goals' Creffier 1 goal' Van Woerkom 2 goals' Russell 4 goals' Woods 1 goal' Radovonich 2 goals' Muir 2 goals'	Report

Umpires:
Matthew Claxton (AUS)
Steve Rogers (AUS)

27 February 2013
14:00

Australia	28–0	Vanuatu
Douglas 10 goals' Govers 4 goals' Crowley 4 goals' Elliot 2 goals' Knee 1 goal' Lim 1 goal' Hayward 1 goal' Rintala 1 goal' Borger 1 goal' Posselt 1 goal' Randhawa 1 goal' Dawson 1 goal'	Report

Umpires:
David Tomlinson (NZL)
Epeli Tukuca (FIJ)

28 February 2013
14:00

Papua New Guinea	3–1	Vanuatu
	Report

Umpires:
Steve Rogers (AUS)
Epeli Tukuca (FIJ)

28 February 2013
16:00

New Zealand	2–4	Australia
Panchia 1 goal' Morris 1 goal'	Report	Govers 1 goal' Douglas 1 goal' Elliot 1 goal' Knee 1 goal'

Umpires:
Adam Barry (AUS)
David Tomlinson (NZL)

2 March 2013
12:00

New Zealand	Cancelled	Vanuatu
	Match cancelled due to weather

2 March 2013
14:00

Australia	Cancelled	Papua New Guinea
	Match cancelled due to weather

==== Classification Stage ====
===== Third and fourth place =====
3 March 2013
10:00

Papua New Guinea	1–2	Vanuatu
Lowah 21'	Report	Iasi 20', 24'

Umpires:
Adam Barry (AUS)
Matthew Claxton (AUS)

===== Final =====
3 March 2013
14:00

Australia	4–2	New Zealand
Govers 17', 47', 50'; Knee 57'	Report	Van Woerkom 12'; Russell 60'

Umpires:
Steve Rogers (AUS)
David Tomlinson (NZL)

== Women's tournament ==
Women's Tournament
- Teams: 2 (from 1 confederation)

Final positions
- Champions: Australia (4th title)
- Runner-up: New Zealand

Tournament statistics
- Matches played: 3
- Goals scored: 14 (4.67 per match)
- Top scorer(s): (Australia) Madison Fitzpatrick (Australia) Mariah Williams (3 goals)

=== Results ===
All times are local (UTC+10).

==== Pool ====
Pos	Team	Pld	W	D	L	GF	GA	GD	Pts	Qualification
1	Australia (H)	3	3	0	0	10	4	+6	9	Junior World Cup
2	New Zealand	3	0	0	3	4	10	−6	0	Junior World Cup

Source: Hockey Australia
Rules for classification: 1) points; 2) matches won; 3) goal difference; 4) goals for; 5) head-to-head result; 6) field goals scored.
(H) Hosts

==== Matches ====
27 February 2013
16:00

Australia	3–1	New Zealand
Williams 22'; Flanagan 51'; Fitzpatrick 64'	Report	Symes

Umpires:
Karen Bennett (NZL)
Dino Willox (WAL)

1 March 2013
16:00

New Zealand	1–4	Australia
Neal 67'	Report	Williams 20'; Nanscawen 37'; Allendorf 49'; Fitzpatrick 59'

Umpires:
Bernadette Pangrazio (AUS)
Karen Bennett (NZL)

3 March 2013
12:00

Australia	3–2	New Zealand
Fitzpatrick 10'; Williams 14'; Peris 53'	Report	Storey 2'; Reidy 51'

Umpires:
Dino Willox (WAL)
Bernadette Pangrazio (AUS)
