= 2026 Women's Junior Oceania Cup =

Field hockey tournament

Tournament details
- Host country: Australia
- City: Redcliffe
- Dates: 1–4 October
- Teams: 2 (from 1 confederation)
- Venue: Redcliffe Hockey Club

Final positions
- Champions: Australia (8th title)
- Runner-up: New Zealand

Tournament statistics
- Matches played: 3
- Goals scored: 13 (4.33 per match)
- Top scorer: (Australia) Kara Bradley (5 goals)

The 2026 Women's Junior Oceania Cup was the eighth edition of the Junior Oceania Cup for women. The event was held at Redcliffe Hockey Club in Redcliffe, Australia from 1–4 October 2026.

The tournament served as the Oceania qualifier for the 2027 FIH Junior World Cup. As the Oceania Hockey Federation received three qualification quotas, both participating nations gained automatic qualification.

== Results ==
=== Standings ===
Pos	Team	Pld	W	D	L	GF	GA	GD	Pts	Qualification
1	Australia (H)	3	3	0	0	11	2	+9	9	2027 Junior World Cup
2	New Zealand	3	0	0	3	2	11	−9	0	2027 Junior World Cup

Source: FIH
Rules for classification: 1) points; 2) goal difference; 3) goals scored; 4) head-to-head result.
(H) Hosts

==== Fixtures ====
1 October 2026
14:00

Australia	5–1	New Zealand
Bradley 1', 42'; Dorman 9'; Kovacevich 17'; Woodger 30'	Report	Findlay 26'

Umpires:
Kelly-Anne Marychurch (NZL)
Iris Milham (AUS)

3 October 2026
16:00

New Zealand	1–3	Australia
Brown 54'	Report	Bradley 4'; Nash 45'; Van der Wath 59'

Umpires:
Jayden Pearson (AUS)
Kelly-Anne Marychurch (NZL)

4 October 2026
14:00

Australia	3–0	New Zealand
Mathison 51'; Bradley 54', 57'	Report

Umpires:
Kelly-Anne Marychurch (NZL)
Iris Milham (AUS)

== Goalscorers ==
There were 13 goals scored in 3 matches, for an average of 4.33 goals per match.

5 goals

- (Australia) Kara Bradley

1 goal

- (Australia) Lola Dorman
- (Australia) Aurora Kovacevich
- (Australia) Camryn Mathison
- (Australia) Lucinda Nash
- (Australia) Karissa van der Wath
- (Australia) Lahni Woodger
- (New Zealand) Roimata Brown
- (New Zealand) Greer Findlay

Source: FIH

== See also ==
- 2026 Men's Junior Oceania Cup
