= New Zealand women's national under-21 field hockey team =

New Zealand
- Association: New Zealand Hockey Federation
- Confederation: OHF (Oceania)
- Head Coach: Danielle Cranston
- Assistant coach(es): Emily Hurtz
- Manager: Vanita Sukha

Junior Oceania Cup
- Appearances: 8 (first in 2000)
- Best result: (silver) 2nd (2000, 2004, 2008, 2013, 2016, 2022, 2025, 2026)

The New Zealand women's national under-21 field hockey team, represents New Zealand in international under-21 field hockey and at the Junior World Cup. The team is controlled by the governing body for field hockey in New Zealand, the New Zealand Hockey Federation, which is currently a member of the Oceania Hockey Federation (OHF) and the International Hockey Federation (FIH).

The team's first recorded appearance was at the 1989 Junior World Cup, where they finished in ninth place.

The team's last appearance was during a 2026 Women's Junior Oceania Cup in Redcliffe where they qualified for the 2027 Junior World Cup.

== History ==
=== Tournament records ===
FIH Junior World Cup
Year	Location	Position	Pld	W	D	L	GF	GA	GD	Pts
1989	Ottawa, Canada	9th	–	–	–	–	–	–	–	–
1993	Terrassa, Spain	Did not participate								
1997	Seongnam, South Korea	Did not participate								
2001	Buenos Aires, Argentina	5th	8	3	1	4	14	11	+3	10
2005	Santiago, Chile	Did not participate								
2009	Boston, United States	10th	7	3	1	3	13	14	–1	10
2013	Mönchengladbach, Germany	9th	6	4	1	1	26	10	+16	13
2016	Santiago, Chile	13th	5	2	1	2	27	10	+17	7
2023	Santiago, Chile	15th	6	1	1	4	12	22	−10	4
2025	Santiago, Chile	19th	6	2	2	2	18	15	+3	8
2027	TBD	Qualified								

Junior Oceania Cup
Year	Location	Position	Pld	W	D	L	GF	GA	GD	Pts
2000	Canberra, Australia	2nd	3	0	1	2	3	6	–3	1
2004	(Australia) Wellington, New Zealand	2nd	3	1	0	2	5	10	–5	3
2008	Brisbane, Australia	2nd	3	1	0	2	5	9	–4	3
2013	Gold Coast, Australia	2nd	3	0	0	3	4	10	–6	0
2016	Gold Coast, Australia	2nd	3	0	0	3	4	9	–5	0
2022	Canberra, Australia	2nd	3	0	1	2	4	9	–5	1
2025	Auckland, New Zealand	2nd	3	0	1	2	5	9	–4	1
2026	Redcliffe, Australia	2nd	3	0	0	3	2	11	–9	0

== Team ==
=== Current squad ===
The following 18 players were named in the squad for the 2019 Tri-Nations Tournament from 3–8 December, in Canberra, Australia.

No.	Pos.	Player	Date of birth (age)	Caps	Goals	Club
1	GK	Saasha Marsters	5 August 1999 (age 27)	5	0	(New Zealand Football) Canterbury
4	GK	Kelly Carline	6 May 2000 (age 26)	4	0	(New Zealand Football) Central
6	DF	Anna Crowley	2 August 2000 (age 26)	3	0	(New Zealand Football) Central
7	DF	Kate Ivory	18 January 1999 (age 27)	4	0	(New Zealand Football) North Harbour
9	DF	Millie Calder	31 March 1999 (age 27)	7	0	(New Zealand Football) Canterbury
14	DF	Eva Zijlstra	23 May 2000 (age 26)	4	0	(New Zealand Football) Midlands
22	DF	Katie Doar	11 September 2001 (age 25)	7	0	(New Zealand Football) Auckland
23	DF	Clodagh McCullough	24 May 1998 (age 28)	4	0	(New Zealand Football) Central
13	MF	Amelia Marlow	26 February 1998 (age 28)	7	0	(New Zealand Football) Auckland
15	MF	Casey Crowley	21 January 1998 (age 28)	4	0	(New Zealand Football) Central
18	MF	Jessie Anderson	29 September 1998 (age 28)	7	0	(New Zealand Football) Canterbury
27	MF	Holly Pearson	7 September 1998 (age 28)	7	3	(New Zealand Football) Central
29	MF	Madison Doar	29 June 1999 (age 27)	4	0	(New Zealand Football) Auckland
2	FW	Olivia Shannon	23 May 2001 (age 25)	4	3	(New Zealand Football) Central
11	FW	Emily Wium	2 August 1999 (age 27)	12	1	(New Zealand Football) Central
11	FW	Kaitlin Cotter	14 November 2001 (age 24)	7	0	(New Zealand Football) Central
17	FW	Hayley Cox	12 June 2000 (age 26)	2	0	(New Zealand Football) Canterbury
21	FW	Hope Ralph	14 April 2000 (age 26)	7	5	(New Zealand Football) Central

== Results ==
=== 2026 Junior Oceania Cup ===
1 October 2026 Match 1	Australia	5–1	New Zealand	Redcliffe, Australia
14:00 (AEST)	Bradley 1', 42'; Dorman 9'; Kovacevich 17'; Woodger 30'		Findlay 26'	Stadium: Redcliffe Hockey Club

3 October 2026 Match 2	New Zealand	1–3	Australia	Redcliffe, Australia
16:00 (AEST)	Brown 54'		Bradley 4'; Nash 45'; Van der Wath 59'	Stadium: Redcliffe Hockey Club

4 October 2026 Match 3	Australia	3–0	New Zealand	Redcliffe, Australia
14:00 (AEST)	Mathison 51'; Bradley 54', 57'			Stadium: Redcliffe Hockey Club

== See also ==
- New Zealand women's national field hockey team
- New Zealand men's national under-21 field hockey team
