= Mihaylia Howell =

Australian field hockey player (born 2006)

Personal information
- Born: 11 March 2006 (age 20) Brisbane, Australia

Sport
- Sport: Field hockey
- Position: Forward
Senior career
| Years | Team | Caps | Goals |
| 2023–2025 | Brisbane Blaze | - | - |
| 2025– | HC Melbourne | - | - |
National team
| Years | Team | Caps | Goals |
| 2025– | Australia U–21 | 19 | (7) |
| 2026– | Australia | 1 | (1) |
Medal record
Women's field hockey
Representing Australia
Junior Oceania Cup
| Gold medal – first place | 2025 Auckland |

Mihaylia Howell (born 11 March 2006) is a field hockey player from Australia.

== Personal life ==
Howell hails from Narangba, a suburb just north of Brisbane, Queensland.

She is a scholarship holder at the Queensland Academy of Sport.

== Career ==
=== Domestic ===
In Hockey Australia's premier domestic league, the One Active Hockey One, Howell represents HC Melbourne. She made the move to the Victorian side for the 2025 season, having previously been a squad member of her home state's representative team, the Brisbane Blaze.

=== Under 21 ===
Howell made her debut for the Australian U–21 side, the Jillaroos, in 2025. She made her first international appearances during the Junior Oceania Cup in Auckland, where she won a gold medal. She continued representing the side during the year, travelling to Europe for an international tour, as well as featuring in a test series against India in Canberra. She finished out 2025 with an appearance at the FIH Junior World Cup in Santiago, helping the Jillaroos to a seventh-place finish.

She remains a member of the national junior squad.

=== Hockeyroos ===
She made her international debut in 2026 during season seven of the FIH Pro League. She earned her first senior cap during a match against Spain in Hobart, scoring a goal on debut. Following a standout performance on debut, she was called into the squad for the 2026 FIH World Cup Qualifiers in Santiago.

== International goals ==
The table lists all international goals scored by Howell at senior level.

| Goal | Date | Location | Opponent | Score | Result | Competition | Ref. |
|---|---|---|---|---|---|---|---|
| 1 | 20 February 2025 | Tasmanian Hockey Centre, Hobart, Australia | Spain | 1–1 | 1–4 | 2025–26 FIH Pro League | |
