= Hayley Padget =

Australian field hockey player

Personal information
- Born: 30 September 1992 (age 33) Doncaster, Victoria

Sport
- Sport: Field hockey
- Position: Midfielder
- Club: Victorian Vipers
National team
Years	Team	Caps	Goals
2011–2013	Australia U–21	8	(1)
2018–2019	Australia	14	(1)
Medal record
Women's field hockey
Representing Australia
Champions Trophy
Silver medal – second place	2018 Changzhou	Team

Hayley Padget (born 30 September 1992) is an Australian field hockey player.

== Personal life ==
Hayley Padget was born in Doncaster, Victoria, and plays representative hockey for the Victorian Vipers.

Padget is also a scholarship holder at the Victorian Institute of Sport.

== Career ==
=== Junior National Team ===
Padget made her debut for the Australia U–21 team during a Four Nations Tournament in New Delhi.

In 2013, Padget was a member of the junior national team at the Australian Youth Olympic Festival, where the team won gold for the first time.

=== Senior National Team ===
Padget made her international debut at the 2018 Sompo Cup in Ibaraki, Japan, scoring a goal on debut.

As of May 2018, Padget is a member of the Australian women's national development squad.
