= 2004 Junior Oceania Cup =

International field hockey tournament hosted by New Zealand

Tournament details
- Host country: New Zealand
- City: Wellington
- Dates: 7–11 December
- Venue: National Hockey Stadium

The 2004 Junior Oceania Cup was an international field hockey tournament hosted by New Zealand. The quadrennial tournament serves as the Junior Championship of Oceania organized by the Oceania Hockey Federation. It was held in Wellington, New Zealand, between 7 and 11 December 2004.

Australia and New Zealand were the only participating teams.

Australia won the tournament in both the men's and women's competitions. The tournament also served as a qualifier for the 2005 men's and women's Junior World Cups, with Australia qualifying for both.

== Men's tournament ==
Men's Tournament
- Teams: 2 (from 1 confederation)

Final positions
- Champions: Australia (1st title)
- Runner-up: New Zealand

Tournament statistics
- Matches played: 3
- Goals scored: 26 (8.67 per match)
- Top scorer: (Australia) Steven Boyce (8 goals)

=== Results ===
All times are local (UTC+12).

==== Pool ====
Pos	Team	Pld	W	D	L	GF	GA	GD	Pts	Qualification
1	Australia	3	3	0	0	22	4	+18	9	Junior World Cup
2	New Zealand (H)	3	0	0	3	4	22	−18	0	

Source: Clearing House
Rules for classification: 1) points; 2) matches won; 3) goal difference; 4) goals for; 5) head-to-head result; 6) field goals scored.
(H) Hosts

==== Matches ====
7 December 2004
16:00

New Zealand	1–9	Australia
Hayward 20'	Report	Ford 7', 16', 44'; Boyce 14', 18', 37', 41'; Naylor 16'; Booth 69'

Stadium:
National Hockey Stadium, Wellington

9 December 2004
14:00

New Zealand	1–6	Australia
Brill 12'	Report	Boyce 11', 45'; Knowles 27'; Ford 51'; Paterson 54'; Mirecki 60'

Stadium:
National Hockey Stadium, Wellington

11 December 2004
16:00

New Zealand	2–7	Australia
Barnett 21', 55'	Report	Knowles 9', 14'; Matheson 18'; Paterson 21'; Abbott 26'; Boyce 29', 41'

Stadium:
National Hockey Stadium, Wellington

== Women's tournament ==
Women's Tournament
- Teams: 2 (from 1 confederation)

Final positions
- Champions: Australia (2nd title)
- Runner-up: New Zealand

Tournament statistics
- Matches played: 3
- Goals scored: 15 (5 per match)
- Top scorer: (Australia) Shannon Bain (3 goals)

=== Results ===
All times are local (UTC+12).

==== Pool ====
Pos	Team	Pld	W	D	L	GF	GA	GD	Pts	Qualification
1	Australia	3	2	0	1	10	5	+5	6	Junior World Cup
2	New Zealand (H)	3	1	0	2	5	10	−5	3	

Source: Clearing House
Rules for classification: 1) points; 2) matches won; 3) goal difference; 4) goals for; 5) head-to-head result; 6) field goals scored.
(H) Hosts

==== Matches ====
7 December 2004
14:00

New Zealand	3–2	Australia
Ryan 8', 48'; Sharland 16'	Report	Harris 2'; Mansell 61'

Stadium:
National Hockey Stadium, Wellington

9 December 2004
16:00

New Zealand	1–4	Australia
Kight 64'	Report	Bain 10', 55'; Lennon 16'; Blyth 30'

Stadium:
National Hockey Stadium, Wellington

11 December 2004
14:00

New Zealand	1–4	Australia
Carr 15'	Report	Pamenter 42'; Meyer 61', 64'; Bain 70'

Stadium:
National Hockey Stadium, Wellington
