= Shanea Tonkin =

Australian field hockey player

Personal information
- Born: 28 April 1997 (age 29) Perth, Western Australia

Sport
- Sport: Field hockey
- Position: Forward
Senior career
Years	Team	Caps	Goals
2017–2018	WA Diamonds	11	3
2019–	Perth Thundersticks	6	1
National team
Years	Team	Caps	Goals
2016	Australia U–21	3	(1)
2022–2023	Australia	14	(4)
Medal record
Women's field hockey
Representing Australia
Commonwealth Games
Silver medal – second place	2022 Birmingham
Junior Oceania Cup
Gold medal – first place	2016 Gold Coast

Shanea Tonkin (born 28 April 1997) is a field hockey player from Australia, who plays as a forward.

== Personal life ==
Shanea Tonkin was born and raised in Perth, Western Australia.

== Career ==
=== Domestic leagues ===
==== AHL ====
Tonkin made her Australian Hockey League debut in 2016 for the NT Stingers.

In 2017 and 2018, Tonkin represented her home state as a member of the WA Diamonds.

==== Hockey One ====
Following the dissolution of the AHL and subsequent introduction of the Sultana Bran Hockey One League, Tonkin was named in the newly formed Perth Thundersticks team. She represented the team in the inaugural season of the league, scoring once in the team's fifth-place finish.

=== National teams ===
==== Under–21 ====
In 2016, Tonkin made her debut for the Australia U–21 team at the Junior Oceania Cup in the Gold Coast.

==== Hockeyroos ====
After multiple years in the Australian development squad, Tonkin was named to the Hockeyroos squad for the first time in 2022.
