= Zandee =

Zandee is a surname. Notable people with the surname include:

- Elzemiek Zandee (born 2001), Dutch field hockey player
- Micah Zandee-Hart (born 1997), Canadian ice hockey player
