= Samoa men's national field hockey team =

Samoa
- Association: OHF (Oceania)
- Confederation: Western Samoa Hockey Association

FIH ranking
- Current: 72 ▲2 (4 October 2026)

Oceania Cup
- Appearances: 3 (first in 2009)
- Best result: (bronze) 3rd (2009)
Medal record
Oceania Cup
Bronze medal – third place	2009 Invercargill

The Samoa men's national field hockey team represents Samoa in international field hockey competitions and is controlled by the Western Samoa Hockey Association.

== Results ==
=== Oceania Cup ===
- 2009 – (bronze)
- 2013 – 4th
- 2015 – 4th

=== Hockey World League ===
- 2014–15 – First round

=== Pacific Games ===
- 1979 - (bronze)

== See also ==
- Samoa women's national field hockey team
