= 2011 Men's Hockey INSEP Challenge =

INSEP Challenge
Tournament details
- Host country: France
- City: Paris
- Teams: 5 (from 3 confederations)
- Venue(s): INSEP

Final positions
- Champions: Ireland (1st title)
- Runner-up: Australia
- Third place: South Korea

Tournament statistics
- Matches played: 10
- Goals scored: 53 (5.3 per match)
- Top scorer(s): (Ireland) Michael Watt (5 goals)

The 2011 Men's Hockey INSEP Challenge was the second edition of the INSEP Challenge, a men's field hockey tournament. It was held in Paris, France, from July 26 to 31, 2011, and featured five of the top nations in men's field hockey.

== Competition format ==
The tournament featured the national teams of Argentina, Australia, Ireland, South Korea, and the hosts, France, competing in a round-robin format, with each team playing each other once. Three points were awarded for a win, one for a draw, and none for a loss.

Country	December 2010 FIH Ranking	Best World Cup finish	Best Olympic Games finish
Argentina	10	Sixth Place (1986, 2002)	Fifth Place (1948)
Australia	1	Champions (1986, 2010)	Champions (2004)
France	17	Seventh Place (1971, 1990)	Fourth Place (1920, 1936)
Ireland	18	Twelfth Place (1978, 1990)	Runners-Up (1908)
South Korea	5	Fourth Place (2002, 2006)	Runners-Up (2000)

== Officials ==
The following umpires were appointed by the International Hockey Federation to officiate the tournament:

- Kim Jung-Yong (KOR)
- Adam Kearns (AUS)
- Eduardo Lizana (ESP)
- Benjamin Mauss (FRA)
- Warren McCully (IRE)
- Maximiliano Scala (ARG)

== Results ==
All times are local (Irish Standard Time).

=== Preliminary round ===
Pos	Team	Pld	W	D	L	GF	GA	GD	Pts	Qualification
1	Ireland	4	3	0	1	13	6	+7	9	Tournament Champion
2	Australia	4	2	1	1	16	11	+5	7	
3	South Korea	4	2	1	1	11	11	0	7	
4	Argentina	4	2	0	2	8	10	−2	6	
5	France (H)	4	0	0	4	5	15	−10	0	

Source: BBC
Rules for classification: 1) points; 2) goal difference; 3) goals scored; 4) head-to-head result.
(H) Hosts

==== Fixtures ====
26 July 2011
14:30

South Korea	1–5	Ireland
Nam 45'	Report	McCabe 4', 6'; Watt 29', 58'; McConnell 34'

Umpires:
Adam Kearns (AUS)
Benjamin Mauss (FRA)

26 July 2011
17:00

France	2–3	Argentina
Magner 52'; Lockwood 54'	Report	R. Vila 34'; Paredes 41'; Cammareri 46'

Umpires:
Eduardo Lizana (ESP)
Warren McCully (IRE)

27 July 2011
15:00

Australia	4–2	Ireland
Paterson 4'; Whetton 21'; Ciriello 37', 48'	Report	Watt 46'; Jermyn 70+'

Umpires:
Kim Jung-Yong (KOR)
Eduardo Lizana (ESP)

28 July 2011
14:30

Argentina	3–2	Australia
Bergner 27', 29', 54'	Report	Ciriello 20'; Butturini 56'

Umpires:
Benjamin Mauss (FRA)
Warren McCully (IRE)

28 July 2011
17:00

South Korea	4–1	France
You 9', 32'; Jang J. 25'; Cho 26'	Report	Magner 6'

Umpires:
Maximiliano Scala (ARG)
Adam Kearns (AUS)

29 July 2011
15:00

Ireland	4–1	Argentina
Watt 4', 70'; Jermyn 8'; Cockram 28'	Report	Ibarra 54'

Umpires:
Kim Jung-Yong (KOR)
Benjamin Mauss (FRA)

30 July 2011
14:00

Australia	4–4	South Korea
Ford 4'; Whetton 11'; Orchard 52'; Bates 63'	Report	Jang J. 8', 15'; Jang K. 43'; Nam 55'

Umpires:
Maximiliano Scala (ARG)
Eduardo Lizana (ESP)

30 July 2011
16:30

Ireland	2–0	France
Jermyn 35+'; Jackson 50'	Report

Umpires:
Adam Kearns (AUS)
Kim Jung-Yong (KOR)

31 July 2011
12:00

Argentina	1–2	South Korea
Rossi 47'	Report	Lee N. 3'; Kim Ju. 34'

Umpires:
Eduardo Lizana (ESP)
Adam Kearns (AUS)

31 July 2011
14:30

France	2–6	Australia
Schambert 54'; Magner 68'	Report	Wilson 17', 66'; Ciriello 31'; Whetton 38'; Ford 44'; Carroll 56'

Umpires:
Eduardo Lizana (ESP)
Adam Kearns (AUS)

== Statistics ==
=== Final standings ===
1. Ireland
2. Australia
3. South Korea
4. Argentina
5. France

=== Goalscorers ===
There were 53 goals scored in 10 matches, for an average of 5.3 goals per match.

5 goals

- (Ireland) Michael Watt

4 goals

- (Australia) Christopher Ciriello

3 goals

- (Argentina) Ignacio Bergner
- (Australia) Jacob Whetton
- (France) Fabien Magner
- (Ireland) Jonathan Jermyn
- (South Korea) Jang Jong-Hyun

2 goals

- (Australia) Russell Ford
- (Australia) Jason Wilson
- (Ireland) Geoffrey McCabe
- (South Korea) You Hyo-Sik
- (South Korea) Nam Hyun-Woo

1 goal

- (Argentina) Lucas Cammareri
- (Argentina) Pedro Ibarra
- (Argentina) Matías Paredes
- (Argentina) Lucas Rossi
- (Argentina) Rodrigo Vila
- (Australia) Timothy Bates
- (Australia) Matthew Butturini
- (Australia) Joel Carroll
- (Australia) Simon Orchard
- (Australia) Mark Paterson
- (France) Viktor Lockwood
- (France) Yannick Schambert
- (Ireland) Timothy Cockram
- (Ireland) Jonathan Jackson
- (Ireland) Andrew McConnell
- (South Korea) Kim Ju-Hun
- (South Korea) Jang Kyu-Yeob
- (South Korea) Lee Nam-Yong
- (South Korea) Cho Suk-Hoon
