= Emily White (field hockey) =

Belgian field hockey player

Personal information
- Born: 20 September 2004 (age 21) Braine-l'Alleud, Belgium

Sport
- Sport: Field hockey
- Position: Forward
Senior career
Years	Team	Caps	Goals
–	Waterloo Ducks	-	-
National team
Years	Team	Caps	Goals
2022–	Belgium U–21	6	(2)
2023–	Belgium	10	(7)
Medal record
Women's field hockey
Representing Belgium
EuroHockey Championship
Silver medal – second place	2023 Mönchengladbach
EuroHockey Junior Championship
Silver medal – second place	2022 Ghent

Emily White (born 20 September 2004) is a Belgian field hockey player.

== Career ==
=== Domestic hockey ===
In Belgium's domestic league, the ION Hockey League, White represents Waterloo Ducks.

=== Under–21 ===
In 2022, White was a member of the Belgium U–21 team that won silver at the EuroHockey Junior Championship in Ghent.

=== National team ===
White made her senior international debut in 2022, during season four of the FIH Pro League.

== International goals ==
No.	Date	Venue	Opponent	Score	Result	Competition
1.	27 May 2023	London, England	China	2–0	3–1	2022–23 Women's FIH Pro League
2.	28 May 2023	London, England	Great Britain	1–1	3–2	2022–23 Women's FIH Pro League
3.	28 May 2023	London, England	Great Britain	2–1	3–2	2022–23 Women's FIH Pro League
4.	3 June 2023	London, England	China	2–0	3–1	2022–23 Women's FIH Pro League
5.	18 June 2023	Antwerp, Belgium	New Zealand	5–0	7–0	2022–23 Women's FIH Pro League
6.	18 June 2023	Antwerp, Belgium	New Zealand	7–0	7–0	2022–23 Women's FIH Pro League
7.	21 June 2023	Antwerp, Belgium	New Zealand	2–0	2–1	2022–23 Women's FIH Pro League
8.	24 August 2023	Mönchengladbach, Germany	Germany	1–0	1–0	2023 Women's EuroHockey Championship
