= Kieran Crowley =

NZ rugby union coach

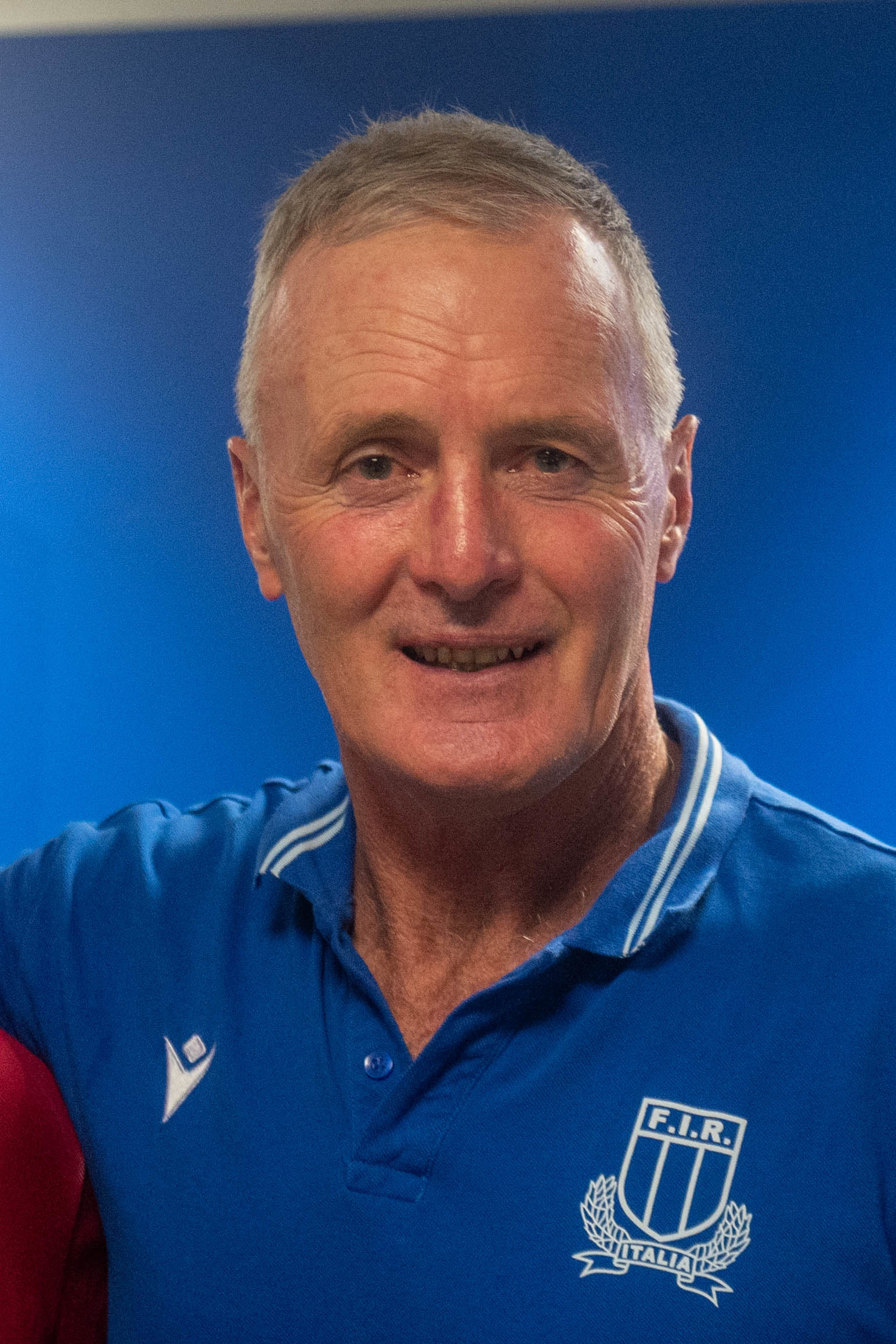
- Crowley, August 2023.
- Full name: Kieran James Crowley
- Born: 31 August 1961 (age 65) Kaponga, New Zealand
- Height: 184 cm (6 ft 0 in)
- Weight: 84 kg (185 lb; 13 st 3 lb)
- School: Sacred Heart College
- Notable relatives: Casey Crowley (daughter); Anna Crowley (niece)

Rugby union career
- Position(s): Fullback, Centre
Senior career
Years	Team	Apps	(Points)
1980–1994	Taranaki	199	(1,723)
- Correct as of 1 January 2024
International career
Years	Team	Apps	(Points)
1980–1982	New Zealand U21	9	(85)
1983–1991	New Zealand	19	(105)
1986	New Zealand Cavaliers	3	(4)
1989	ANZAC XV	1	(0)
- Correct as of 1 January 2024
Coaching career
- Years: Team
- 1998–2002: Taranaki (assistant)
- 2003–2007: Taranaki
- 2007: New Zealand U19
- 2008–2016: Canada
- 2016–2021: Benetton
- 2021–2023: Italy
- 2024–: Mie Honda Heat
- Correct as of 1 January 2024

Kieran James Crowley (born 31 August 1961) is a New Zealand rugby union coach and former player, who is the former head coach of Italy. He has also coached the New Zealand Under-19s in the 2007 World Championships as well as coaching provincial side Taranaki. He previously served as head coach of Canada. He also spent five seasons coaching Benetton Rugby.

He is a former member of the New Zealand All Blacks where he played as a fullback.

== Early life ==
Crowley was born in Kaponga, New Zealand. He first started playing rugby for his school, Sacred Heart College, in Auckland, where he was in the 1st XV in 1977, and in 1979, he was selected for the 1979 North Island Under-18 team.

== Playing career ==
Crowley made his Taranaki debut in 1980 as an 18-year-old, playing variously at fullback, wing, and second five eighth. He also appeared for the New Zealand Colts team in 1980, and again the following two seasons.

After a New Zealand trial in 1982 and playing for the North Island, in 1983 Crowley came into the All Black side for their 1983 British Isles tour. He was a late call up to the side, having replaced Allan Hewson who injured himself in training prior to the team's departure. He failed to make any appearance in the test side, but did play against South of Scotland team in Galashiels to make his first All Blacks appearance, winning 30–9. He made further two appearances, winning 18–15 and 18–6 against London Division and South and South-West Counties respectively. He gained his first taste of international opposition against Fiji on 27 October 1984, however the All Blacks fielded an All Blacks XV side, and did not award caps for the match. Crowley received his first international cap on 1 June 1985 against England in Christchurch, winning 18–13. He appeared in tests against Australia and Argentina that year, and against Australia and France in 1986.

In 1987, he was part of the 1987 World Cup winning side, included in the squad as a backup for fullback John Gallagher, and again he featured in the side for the 1991 World Cup, not as an original choice, but was called up after injury to Terry Wright, and played the semi-final against Australia, losing 16–6 in Dublin.

Crowley continued to play for Taranaki until 1994, becoming its leading points scorer and one of the few players to play 200 games for his Union. He was made a life member of the Taranaki RFU in 1993.

=== Honours ===
- Rugby World Cup
  - Winners: 1987
- Bledisloe Cup
  - Winners: 1985, 1990, 1991

== Cricket ==
Crowley also played cricket for Taranaki in the Hawke Cup and for Central Districts in one season of the Brabin Cup (Second XI) competition.

== Coaching career ==
Crowley was coach of the Taranaki provincial side from 1998 to 2007. From 2002 to 2003 he also acted as a selector for the All Blacks. In 2007, he coached the New Zealand Under 19s at the World Championships in Ireland, where they went undefeated, beating South Africa in the final 31–7, winning the competition for the first time since 2004.

=== Canada ===
In March 2008, Rugby Canada announced that Crowley would be replacing Ric Suggitt as head coach of the Canadian national team. On his announcement, he recognized that Canada was always recognized as a physical side, but Crowley wanted to put more of an emphasis on the development of skills and their attacking play. His first match in charge was against Scotland A in the 2008 Churchill Cup. Canada lost 24–10, then lost 17–16 to an Argentina XV side. His first official test match came on 21 June 2008 against the United States in Chicago, in the bowl final. On that occasion, Canada won 26–10. In November of that year, Crowley led Canada to a 4-match tour of Europe which included 3 tier 1 oppositions, the most Canada has ever faced on 1 tour. The first match of the tour, was a first ever encounter against Portugal, with Canada winning 21–13 in Lisbon. However, the final three match saw Canada score just 13 points, with Canada failing to score any points against Ireland (55–0), and Scotland (41–0). Though they did manage to push Wales at the Millennium Stadium, being just 4 points behind them at half time, 10–6. However, they were unable to stay in touch with the Six Nations Champions, with Warren Gatlands side running away with the match to win 34–13.

In 2009, Crowley had his first incoming tour from a European side, in the likes of Ireland and Wales. Canada lost both matches, 25–6 and 32–23. During the 2009 Churchill Cup, Crowley won just his third test match, winning 42–10 over Georgia. However, a defeat to Ireland Wolfhounds, saw Canada face the Argentina Jaguars in the Plate Final, losing 29–44. On 11 July 2009, Crowley guided Canada to qualification for the 2011 Rugby World Cup, beating the United States with an aggregate score of 47–30. They joined the World Cup in Pool A, which featured the hosts New Zealand. On 15 and 21 November, Canada faced Japan in a 2-test match series in Japan. Canada lost both matches, 46–8 and 27–6, which were Canada's first loss to Japan since 2004. A win a week later against Russia was in need, with Crowley coming under pressure. Then on 28 November, Canada beat Russia 22–6 at Swangard Stadium. In 2010, Crowley led Canada to their best ever season, losing just two matches all year. The season began with a 48–6 win over Uruguay and a 33–27 win over France A, to set up a Cup final against the England Saxons. However, Canada lost 38–18 to the England 'A' side. During their 2010 European tour, Crowley guided the team to Victories over Belgium, Spain and Portugal, where fans got to see what Crowley was trying to put together in terms of attack. The only loss came against Georgia, losing 22–15.

In 2011, Canada finished as runner-up for the second consecutive time in the Churchill Cup, before winning back to back tests against the United States. During the World Cup, Canada opened their campaign with a 25–20 win over Tonga, before losing 46–19 to France 4 days later. Canada drew with Japan 23–23, then lost to hosts New Zealand 79–15. They finished fourth in their pool, which meant not only would they not make the knock-out stages, but Canada would have to go through the qualification process to qualify for the 2015 Rugby World Cup.

From 2012, Canada would face tier 1 opposition at home every year, and their first opponent was Italy who won the match 25–16. In November 2012, Canada participated in the 2012 International Rugby Series in North Wales, where they faced Samoa, losing 42–12, and Russia winning 35–3. In 2013, Canada and the United States joined the World Rugby Pacific Nations Cup, which included the likes of Fiji, Samoa, Tonga and Japan. Their first match was against other newcomer the United States, where Canada won 16–9. Canada also defeated Fiji and Tonga 20–18 and 36–27 respectively, and were in pole position to win the tournament in their debut season. However, a week before their final match on 16 June, they faced Ireland at home, who won the match 40–14. The physical encounter at BMO Field was believed to have taken a lot of energy out of the player, and impacted the team greatly heading into the PNC decider against Japan on 19 June. Japan narrowly won the match 16–13, which meant Canada could only win the match should Fiji or Japan lose another match. Canada came second in their debut season. On 17 and 24 August, Crowley guided Canada to a 40–20 aggregate score over the United States to qualify for the 2015 Rugby World Cup. The first test included a 27–9 victory over the States in the away fixture for Canada. That meant USA needed to win by 19 points or more in Canada to qualify, which has never happened between the two teams.

On 3 November 2013, Crowley led Canada against the Māori All Blacks at home, with the Māori team out playing Canada, winning 40–15 at BMO Field. Canada then lost 2 consecutive matches against Georgia and Romania, before beating Portugal 52–8. In 2014, Canada narrowly lost to Scotland at home 19–17. A red card to Flanker Jebb Sinclair meant that Canada was down to 14 men for the final 5 minutes and Scotland's defence held strong to hold back any come back by the Canadians. In addition to this, Canada went winless during the 2014 IRB Pacific Nations Cup, losing to Japan 34–25 at home, despite leading Japan 25–9 at half time. Then on 21 June, they lost to the United States, 38–35, for the first time since July 2009. During their European tour, Crowley managed 1 win, narrowly beating Tier 3 side Namibia 17–13, but losing to Samoa 23–13 and Romania 18–9.

In August 2015, Crowley led Canada to last place in the 2015 World Rugby Pacific Nations Cup losing all four matches; 20–6 against Japan, 28–18 to Tonga and 21–20 to Samoa. That set-up a 5th Place play-off match against the United States, which saw a last minute drop goal, to secure the match for the States 15–13. Crowley later led Canada to a 41–23 loss to the States, which was a seventh loss in a row for Canada, and a third in a row against the States. Crowley ended the streak with a 19–12 victory over the Glasgow Warriors, though their test losing streak ended when Canada beat Georgia 16–15 in Esher, Surrey.

During the 2015 Rugby World Cup, Canada failed to win a single match, despite picking up 2 bonus points. Crowley led Canada to a 50–7 loss to Ireland, before narrowly losing to Italy 23–18. They lost to France 41–18, before losing to Romania 15–17, despite being 15–0 up with 20 minutes left in the match. A last minute penalty for Romania, saw them take the match in the closing seconds. Canada's poor form throughout 2015, saw Canada ultimately drop to 19th in the World Rugby Rankings by the end of 2015, Canada's worst ever position.

After the World Cup, a Rugby Canada Rugby World Cup review recommended extending the end date of Crowley's contract from mid-2016 to August 2017. On 22 December, Crowley accepted the extension which will see him coach Canada through to their 2019 Rugby World Cup qualification matches in August 2017. On 6 January 2016, Crowley stood down as Canadian head coach despite the re-signed contract.

=== Italy ===
On 13 January 2016, it was announced that Crowley would coach Benetton Treviso from the start of the 2016–17 season.

In May 2021, it was confirmed that Crowley would leave Benetton to take the role of head coach of Italy. During his tenure up to the beginning of the 2023 Rugby World Cup, Crowley totaled 1 victory and 2 losses in 2021, 5 victories (including one each against Australia and Wales) and 6 losses in 2022, and 2 victories and 7 losses in 2023, for a total of 8 victories and 15 losses, the best victory rate (34,78%) of any Italy head coach since Pierre Berbizier (40% in the period 2005-2007). His coaching had been widely praised for the marked improvements of Italy's discipline and offensive capabilities, and for his selection into the team of a new generation of promising young players.

On June 16, 2023 the Italian Rugby Federation officially announced that the Argentine Gonzalo Quesada had been selected as the new head coach of the Italy national rugby union team, replacing Crowley from January 1, 2024.

=== MIE Honda Heat ===
In November 2023, Crowley was appointed as new head coach of MIE Honda Heat in Japan’s League One.

=== Honours ===
- Churchill Cup
  - Runners-up: 2010, 2011
- World Rugby Pacific Nations Cup
  - Runners-up: 2013

Sporting positions
Preceded by (Canada) Ric Suggitt	Canada national rugby union team head coach 2008–2016	Succeeded by (France) Francois Ratier (Interim)
Preceded by (South Africa) Franco Smith	Italy national rugby union team head coach 2021–2023	Succeeded by (Argentina) Gonzalo Quesada
