= 2009 Men's Oceania Cup =

Field hockey tournament

2009 Oceania Cup
Tournament details
- Host country: New Zealand
- City: Invercargill
- Dates: 25–29 August
- Venue: Hockey Southland

Final positions
- Champions: Australia (6th title)
- Runner-up: New Zealand
- Third place: Samoa

Tournament statistics
- Matches played: 4
- Goals scored: 56 (14 per match)
- Top scorer: (Australia) Jamie Dwyer (8 goals)

The 2009 Men's Oceania Cup was the sixth edition of the men's field hockey tournament. It was held from 25 to 29 August in Invercargill.

The tournament served as a qualifier for the 2010 FIH World Cup.

Australia won the tournament for the sixth time, defeating New Zealand 3–1 in the final.

== Teams ==
- Australia
- New Zealand
- Samoa

== Results ==
All times are local (NZST).

=== Preliminary round ===
==== Pool ====
Pos	Team	Pld	W	D	L	GF	GA	GD	Pts	Qualification
1	Australia	2	2	0	0	31	2	+29	6	Advanced to Final
2	New Zealand (H)	2	1	0	1	21	5	+16	3	Advanced to Final
3	Samoa	2	0	0	2	0	45	−45	0	

Source: Hockey Australia
Rules for classification: 1) points; 2) goal difference; 3) goals scored; 4) head-to-head result.
(H) Hosts

==== Fixtures ====
25 August 2009
13:15

Australia	26–0	Samoa
Dwyer 1', 31', 33', 35', 44'; Orchard 7', 19', 52', 66'; Turner 8', 16', 32'; Butturini 12'; Knowles 15'; Schubert 21', 54', 55'; Abbott 30', 46', 69'; Doerner 49', 51', 70'; Kavanagh 54'; Ockenden 61'; Paterson 63'	Report

Umpires:
Amarjit Singh (MAS)
Satinder Kumar (IND)

26 August 2009
15:15

New Zealand	2–5	Australia
Burrows 19'; Panchia 31'	Report	Doerner 22', 49'; Dwyer 33', 69'; Abbott 43'

Umpires:
Satinder Kumar (IND)
Amarjit Singh (MAS)

27 August 2009
13:15

Samoa	0–19	New Zealand
	Report	Burrows (5 goals); Baker (3 goals); Child (1 goal); Petherick (1 goal); B. Shaw (1 goal); H. Shaw (2 goals); Wilson (6 goals)

Umpires:
Amarjit Singh (MAS)
Satinder Kumar (IND)

=== Classification ===
==== Final ====
29 August 2009
15:15

Australia	3–1	New Zealand
Schubert 9', 35'; Dwyer 70'	Report	Wilson 7'

Umpires:
Satinder Kumar (IND)
Amarjit Singh (MAS)

== Statistics ==
=== Final standings ===
As per statistical convention in field hockey, matches decided in extra time are counted as wins and losses, while matches decided by penalty shoot-outs are counted as draws.

Pos	Team	Pld	W	D	L	GF	GA	GD	Pts	Status
1st place, gold medalist(s)	Australia	3	3	0	0	34	3	+31	9	Qualified for 2010 FIH World Cup
2nd place, silver medalist(s)	New Zealand (H)	3	1	0	2	22	8	+14	3	
3rd place, bronze medalist(s)	Samoa	2	0	0	2	0	45	−45	0	

Source: Hockey Australia
(H) Hosts
