= Vanuatu Hockey Federation =

Governing body of field hockey in Vanuatu

The Vanuatu Hockey Federation is the governing body of field hockey in Vanuatu, Oceania. Its headquarters were earlier in St. Tusmore, South Australia, Australia, but now have been moved to Port Vila, Vanuatu. It is affiliated to IHF International Hockey Federation and Oceania Hockey Federation.

Peter Robinson is the President of Hockey Association of Vanuatu and Lolyne Kalsrap is the General Secretary.

In the International Hockey Federation's 2014 Congress Awards, Vanuatu won the Etienne Glichitch Award. This recognised hockey as the fastest growing sport in Vanuatu, as identified by their Olympic Games Committee.

== See also ==
- Oceania Hockey Federation
