= Tonga Hockey Federation =

Governing body of field hockey in Tonga

The Tonga Hockey Federation (THF) is the governing body of field hockey in Tonga, Oceania. Its headquarters are in Nuku'Alofa, Tonga. It is affiliated to the International Hockey Federation and the Oceania Hockey Federation.

Rev. Dr Tevita Mohenoa Puloka is the President of Hockey Association of Tonga and Rev. Ikani Taliai Tolu is the General Secretary.
