= 2016 Junior Oceania Cup =

Field hockey tournament

Tournament details
- Host country: Australia
- City: Gold Coast
- Dates: 21–24 January
- Teams: 2 (from 1 confederation)
- Venue: Gold Coast Hockey Centre

The 2016 Junior Oceania Cup was a field hockey tournament held in Gold Coast, Australia. The tournament served as a qualifier for the 2016 Men's and Women's Junior Hockey World Cups.

Both the Australian men's and women's teams finished the tournament undefeated, qualifying directly to the Junior World Cups. As Oceania is allocated two qualification places in the tournaments, both New Zealand teams also qualified for the Junior World Cups.

== Teams ==
As the tournament was a qualifier for the Hockey Junior World Cups, only players under the age of 21 were eligible to play. While the Oceania Hockey Federation comprises multiple teams, only two participated in both the men's and women's tournaments.

Men's tournament

- Australia
- New Zealand

Women's tournament

- Australia
- New Zealand

== Men's tournament ==
Men's Tournament
Final positions
- Champions: Australia (4th title)
- Runner-up: New Zealand

Tournament statistics
- Matches played: 3
- Goals scored: 12 (4 per match)
- Top scorer: (Australia) Max Hendry (3 goals)

=== Results ===
Pos	Team	Pld	W	D	L	GF	GA	GD	Pts	Qualification
1	Australia (H)	3	3	0	0	10	2	+8	9	Junior World Cup
2	New Zealand	3	0	0	3	2	10	−8	0	Junior World Cup

Source: Hockey Australia
Rules for classification: 1) points; 2) goal difference; 3) goals scored; 4) head-to-head result.
(H) Hosts

21 January 2016
17:00

Australia	3–0	New Zealand
Gerrard 10'; Craig 13'; Scanlon 32'	Report

Umpires:
Bevan Nichol (NZL)
Tim Pullman (AUS)

22 January 2016
17:00

New Zealand	1–5	Australia
Sarikaya 40'	Report	Hendry 23', 25', 44'; Farmilo 34'; Brand 49'

Umpires:
Tim Pullman (AUS)
Bevan Nichol (NZL)

24 January 2016
11:00

Australia	2–1	New Zealand
Gerrard 3'; Beltz 38'	Report	Sarikaya 13'

Umpires:
Bevan Nichol (NZL)
Tim Pullman (AUS)

== Women's tournament ==
Women's Tournament
Final positions
- Champions: Australia (5th title)
- Runner-up: New Zealand

Tournament statistics
- Matches played: 3
- Goals scored: 13 (4.33 per match)
- Top scorer: (Australia) Madeleine Ratcliffe (4 goals)

=== Results ===
Pos	Team	Pld	W	D	L	GF	GA	GD	Pts	Qualification
1	Australia (H)	3	3	0	0	9	4	+5	9	Junior World Cup
2	New Zealand	3	0	0	3	4	9	−5	0	Junior World Cup

Source: Hockey Australia
Rules for classification: 1) points; 2) goal difference; 3) goals scored; 4) head-to-head result.
(H) Hosts

21 January 2016
19:00

Australia	2–1	New Zealand
Wilson 3'; Ratcliffe 37'	Report	Jaques 8'

Keith Hunt Park
Umpires:
Kelly Hudson (NZL)
Janelle Bond (AUS)

22 January 2016
19:00

New Zealand	2–3	Australia
Ritchie 50'; Robinson 70+'	Report	Fitzpatrick 14'; Ratcliffe 32', 66'

Keith Hunt Park
Umpires:
Janelle Bond (AUS)
Kelly Hudson (NZL)

24 January 2016
09:00

Australia	4–1	New Zealand
Murphy 12'; Tonkin 27'; Patterson 49'; Ratcliffe 67'	Report	Steele 46'

Keith Hunt Park
Umpires:
Kelly Hudson (NZL)
Janelle Bond (AUS)

== Statistics ==
=== Final standings ===
Men's tournament

1. Australia
2. New Zealand

Women's tournament

1. Australia
2. New Zealand

=== Goalscorers ===
==== Men's Scorers ====
3 Goals

- (Australia) Max Hendry

2 Goals

- (Australia) Frazer Gerrard
- (New Zealand) Aidan Sarikaya

1 Goal

- (Australia) Joshua Beltz
- (Australia) Tim Brand
- (Australia) Tom Craig
- (Australia) Isaac Farmilo
- (Australia) Andrew Scanlon

==== Women's Scorers ====
4 Goals

- (Australia) Madi Ratcliffe

1 Goal

- (Australia) Madeleine Murphy
- (Australia) Shanea Tonkin
- (Australia) Georgia Wilson
- (Australia) Savannah Fitzpatrick
- (Australia) Mikaela Patterson
- (New Zealand) Alia Jaques
- (New Zealand) Deanna Ritchie
- (New Zealand) Amy Robinson
- (New Zealand) Phoebe Steele
