= Solomon Islands Hockey Association =

Governing body of field hockey in the Solomon Islands

The Solomon Islands Hockey Association is the governing body of field hockey in Solomon Islands, Oceania. Its headquarters are in Honiara, Solomon Islands. It is affiliated to IHF International Hockey Federation and OCF Oceania Hockey Federation.

Nihal Seneviratne is the President of Solomon Islands Hockey Association and Mr Joe Vasuni is the General Secretary.

== History ==
Hockey Solomons visited Fiji for the first time in 37 years, when their men's and women's teams visited Fiji in June-July, 2016. The women's team will be visiting Malaysia in January, 2017 and Bangladesh in May 2017.

== See also ==
- Oceania Hockey Federation
