= Hannah Cullum-Sanders =

Australian field hockey player

Hannah Cullum Sanders
Personal information
- Born: 30 July 2003 (age 23) Maryborough, Queensland

Sport
- Sport: Field hockey
- Position: Forward
Senior career
Years	Team	Caps	Goals
2022–	Brisbane Blaze	-	-
National team
Years	Team	Caps	Goals
2022–	Australia	25	(2)
2023–2023	Australia U–21	6	(3)
Medal record
Women's field hockey
Representing Australia
FIH World Cup
Bronze medal – third place	2022 Terrassa–Amstelveen	Team
FIH Pro League
Bronze medal – third place	Season Four	Team

Hannah Cullum-Sanders (born 30 July 2003) is a field hockey player from Australia, who plays as a forward.

== Personal life ==
Hannah Cullum-Sanders was born and raised in Maryborough, Queensland. She graduated from Aldridge State High School in 2021.

== Career ==
=== Domestic hockey ===
Cullum-Sanders has represented her home state, Queensland, at junior level on numerous occasions. She also plays for Redcliffe in the Brisbane Hockey League.

=== Hockeyroos ===
In 2022, Cullum-Sanders was named in the Australian Development Squad for the first time. In May of that year, she was named in the Hockeyroos squad for the 2022 Trans-Tasman Series in Auckland, where she made her international debut.

== International goals ==
The following is a list of international goals scored by Cullum-Sanders.

Goal	Date	Location	Opponent	Score	Result	Competition	Ref.
1	28 February 2023	Tasmanian Hockey Centre, Hobart, Tasmania	Argentina	1–0	2–0	2022–23 FIH Pro League	
2	22 February 2026	Tasmanian Hockey Centre, Hobart, Tasmania	China	1–3	1–3	2025–26 FIH Pro League	
