= 2019 Women's Under–21 Tri Nations Hockey Tournament =

2019 Under–21 Tri Nations Hockey Tournament
Tournament details
- Host country: Australia
- City: Canberra
- Dates: 3–8 December
- Teams: 3
- Venue: National Hockey Centre

Final positions
- Champions: India
- Runner-up: Australia
- Third place: New Zealand

Tournament statistics
- Matches played: 6
- Goals scored: 20 (3.33 per match)
- Top scorer: (New Zealand) Olivia Shannon (3 goals)

The 2019 Women's Under–21 Tri Nations Hockey Tournament was an invitational women's under–21 field hockey competition, hosted by Hockey Australia. The tournament took place between 3–8 December 2019 in Canberra, Australia. A total of three teams competed for the title.

India won the tournament, finishing top of the pool after the round-robin stage. Australia and New Zealand finished second and third, respectively.

== Teams ==
Including Australia, 3 teams were invited by Hockey Australia to participate in the tournament.

- Australia (host nation)
- India
- New Zealand

== Results ==
All times are local (UTC+11:00).

=== Pool ===
Pos	Team	Pld	W	D	L	GF	GA	GD	Pts	Result
1	India	4	2	1	1	8	4	+4	7	Tournament Champion
2	Australia (H)	4	2	1	1	7	6	+1	7	
3	New Zealand	4	1	0	3	5	10	−5	3	

Source: FIH
Rules for classification: 1) points; 2) goal difference; 3) games won; 4) head-to-head result.
(H) Hosts

=== Fixtures ===
3 December 2019
18:00

Australia	1–3	New Zealand
Utri 50'	Report	Shannon 3'; Ralph 47', 52'

Umpires:
Nicola Brown (AUS)
Rachel Murphy (NZL)

4 December 2019
18:00

New Zealand	0–2	India
	Report	Lalrindiki 15'; Prabhleen 60'

Umpires:
Lalremruati Khiangte (IND)
Nicola Brown (AUS)

5 December 2019
18:00

India	1–1	Australia
Gagandeep 52'	Report	Schonell 25'

Umpires:
Rachel Murphy (NZL)
Lalremruati Khiangte (IND)

6 December 2019
18:00

New Zealand	1–3	Australia
Shannon 53'	Report	Utri 19'; Arnott 40'; Morgan 57'

Umpires:
Nicola Brown (AUS)
Rachel Murphy (NZL)

7 December 2019
14:00

India	4–1	New Zealand
Sharmila 12', 43'; Dungdung 27'; Lalrindiki 48'	Report	Shannon 4'

Umpires:
Lalremruati Khiangte (IND)
Rachel Murphy (NZL)

8 December 2019
10:00

Australia	2–1	India
Wilson 15', 56'	Report	Gagandeep 53'

Umpires:
Nicola Brown (AUS)
Rachel Murphy (NZL)

== Statistics ==
=== Final standings ===
1. India
2. Australia
3. New Zealand

=== Goalscorers ===
There were 20 goals scored in 6 matches, for an average of 3.33 goals per match.

3 goals

- (New Zealand) Olivia Shannon

2 goals

- (Australia) Aisling Utri
- (Australia) Abigail Wilson
- (India) Sharmila Devi
- (India) Gagandeep Kaur
- (India) Lalrindiki
- (New Zealand) Hope Ralph

1 goal

- (Australia) Alice Arnott
- (Australia) Phillipa Morgan
- (Australia) Courtney Schonell
- (India) Beauty Dungdung
- (India) Prabhleen Kaur

Source: FIH
