= 1993 Women's Hockey Junior World Cup =

Second edition of the Women's Hockey Junior World Cup

Tournament details
- Host country: Spain
- City: Terrassa
- Dates: 7–18 September
- Teams: 12 (from 5 confederations)
- Venue: Atlètic Terrassa Hockey Club

Final positions
- Champions: Argentina (1st title)
- Runner-up: Australia
- Third place: Germany

Tournament statistics
- Matches played: 42
- Goals scored: 163 (3.88 per match)

The 1993 Women's Hockey Junior World Cup was the second edition of the Women's Hockey Junior World Cup, the quadrennial women's under-21 field hockey world championship organized by the International Hockey Federation. It was held at Atlètic Terrassa Hockey Club in Terrassa, Spain from 7 to 18 September 1993.

Argentina won the tournament for the first time by defeating Australia 2–1 in the final. The defending champions Germany won the bronze medal by defeating South Korea 3–2 after penalty strokes.

== Preliminary round ==
=== Pool A ===
Pos	Team	Pld	W	D	L	GF	GA	GD	Pts	Qualification
1	Germany	5	5	0	0	16	5	+11	10	Semi-finals
2	Argentina	5	3	1	1	8	5	+3	7	Semi-finals
3	China	5	2	2	1	14	7	+7	6	
4	Spain (H)	5	2	1	2	8	7	+1	5	
5	England	5	0	1	4	5	15	−10	1	
6	Kenya	5	0	1	4	4	16	−12	1	

Source: FIH
(H) Hosts

7 September 1993
16:00

Germany	4–1	Kenya

7 September 1993
17:30

China	2–2	Argentina

7 September 1993
19:00

England	0–2	Spain

8 September 1993
20:00

England	2–2	Kenya

9 September 1993
16:30

Argentina	0–3	Germany

9 September 1993
19:00

China	2–2	Spain

10 September 1993
16:30

Germany	4–2	England

10 September 1993
17:30

Spain	2–1	Kenya

11 September 1993
17:30

Kenya	0–4	China

11 September 1993
20:00

Argentina	1–0	England

12 September 1993
17:30

Germany	2–0	China

12 September 1993
19:00

Spain	0–1	Argentina

14 September 1993
17:30

England	1–6	China

14 September 1993
19:00

Spain	2–3	Germany

14 September 1993
20:00

Kenya	0–4	Argentina

=== Pool B ===
Pos	Team	Pld	W	D	L	GF	GA	GD	Pts	Qualification
1	South Korea	5	5	0	0	22	3	+19	10	Semi-finals
2	Australia	5	4	0	1	24	4	+20	8	Semi-finals
3	Netherlands	5	3	0	2	21	5	+16	6	
4	Canada	5	2	0	3	4	13	−9	4	
5	Trinidad and Tobago	5	1	0	4	3	26	−23	2	
6	Scotland	5	0	0	5	1	24	−23	0	

Source: FIH

7 September 1993
10:00

Trinidad and Tobago	0–8	Australia

7 September 1993
12:30

Netherlands	7–0	Scotland

8 September 1993
11:30

Trinidad and Tobago	0–6	Netherlands

8 September 1993
13:30

South Korea	4–1	Canada

9 September 1993
12:30

Scotland	0–9	Australia

10 September 1993
10:00

Netherlands	1–2	South Korea

10 September 1993
11:30

Australia	4–0	Canada

11 September 1993
11:30

Canada	2–0	Trinidad and Tobago

11 September 1993
13:30

South Korea	5–0	Scotland

12 September 1993
13:30

Australia	3–2	Netherlands
Morris 17', 45'; Annan 59'	Report	Appels 35'; Van den Boogaard 59'

13 September 1993
10:00

Canada	1–0	Scotland

13 September 1993
13:30

South Korea	9–1	Trinidad and Tobago

14 September 1993
11:30

Netherlands	5–0	Canada
Vinke 10', 41'; Donners 25'; Boomgaardt 29'; Smabers 56'	Report

14 September 1993
12:30

Scotland	1–2	Trinidad and Tobago

14 September 1993
16:30

Australia	0–2	South Korea

== Second round ==
=== Ninth to twelfth place classification ===
Semi-finals
17 September
England	2
Scotland	1
17 September
Kenya	2
Trinidad and Tobago	1

Ninth place
18 September
England	1
Kenya	0
11th place
18 September
Scotland	3
Trinidad and Tobago	1

=== Fifth to eighth place classification ===
Semi-finals
16 September
China	2
Canada	0
16 September
Spain	0
Netherlands	4

Fifth place
17 September
China	0
Netherlands	1
Seventh place
17 September
Canada	0
Spain	1

=== First to fourth place classification ===
Semi-finals
16 September
Germany	2 (4)
Australia (p.s.)	2 (5)
16 September
Argentina	2
South Korea	1

Final
18 September
Australia	1
Argentina	2
Third place
18 September
Germany (p.s.)	2 (3)
South Korea	2 (2)

==== Semi-finals ====
16 September 1993
16:30

Germany	2–2 (a.e.t.)	Australia
Penalties
	4–5

16 September 1993
19:00

Argentina	2–1	South Korea

==== Third and fourth place ====
18 September 1993
16:30

Germany	2–2 (a.e.t.)	South Korea
Penalties
	3–2

==== Final ====
18 September 1993
19:00

Australia	1–2	Argentina

== Final standings ==
1. Argentina
2. Australia
3. Germany
4. South Korea
5. Netherlands
6. China
7. Spain
8. Canada
9. England
10. Kenya
11. Scotland
12. Trinidad and Tobago

== See also ==
- 1993 Men's Hockey Junior World Cup
