= Karissa van der Wath =

Australian field hockey player (born 2006)

Personal information
- Born: 7 July 2006 (age 20)

Sport
- Sport: Field hockey
- Position: Midfield
Senior career
Years	Team	Caps	Goals
2024–	Brisbane Blaze	-	-
National team
Years	Team	Caps	Goals
2023–	Australia U–21	9	(1)
2025–	Australia	0	(0)
Medal record
Women's field hockey
Representing Australia
Junior Oceania Cup
Gold medal – first place	2025 Auckland

Karissa van der Wath (born 7 July 2006) is a field hockey player from Australia.

== Personal life ==
Karissa van der Wath was born in Sydney, and grew up in the suburb of Baulkham Hills. Her family later relocated to Brisbane.

She is a current scholarship holder at the Queensland Academy of Sport.

== Career ==
=== Domestic ===
In Hockey Australia's premier domestic league, the Liberty Hockey One, Van der Wath represents her home state as a member of the Brisbane Blaze. She also represents Queensland in at junior level, having won multiple national championships with the state side.

=== Under 21 ===
Van der Wath made her debut for the Australian U–21 side, the Jillaroos, in 2023. She made her first appearances for the team at the FIH Junior World Cup in Santiago.

In 2025 she won a gold medal with the team at the Junior Oceania Cup in Auckland.

=== Hockeyroos ===
Following an outstanding appearance at the Junior Oceania Cup, Van der Wath received her first call–up to the Hockeyroos in 2025. She will make her senior international debut during the Santiago del Estero leg of the 2024–25 FIH Pro League.
