= Elzemiek Zandee =

Dutch field hockey player

Personal information
- Full name: Elzemiek Maria Zandee
- Born: 24 June 2001 (age 25) Netherlands

Sport
- Sport: Field hockey
- Position: Midfield
Senior career
Years	Team	Caps	Goals
–	SCHC	-	-
National team
Years	Team	Caps	Goals
2022–	Netherlands U–21	5	(0)
2022–	Netherlands	11	(2)
Medal record
Women's field hockey
Representing Netherlands
FIH Pro League
Gold medal – first place	Season Four	Team
EuroHockey Junior Championships
Bronze medal – third place	2022 Ghent	Team

Elzemiek Maria Zandee (born 24 June 2001) is a field hockey player from the Netherlands.

== Career ==
=== Domestic hockey ===
In the Netherlands' domestic league, the Hoofdklasse, Zandee represents SCHC.

=== Under–21 ===
In 2022, Zandee was a member of the Netherlands U–21 team that won bronze at the EuroHockey Junior Championship in Ghent.

=== National team ===
Zandee made her senior international debut in 2022 during season three of the FIH Pro League.

In 2023, she made her way into the national squad for the first time. She was a member of the gold medal-winning squad during season four of the FIH Pro League.

==== International goals ====
Goal	Date	Location	Opponent	Score	Result	Competition	Ref.
1	27 June 2023	Wagener Stadium, Amsterdam, Netherlands	New Zealand	4–1	2–1	2022–23 FIH Pro League	
2	27 June 2023	Wagener Stadium, Amsterdam, Netherlands	New Zealand	6–1	2–1	2022–23 FIH Pro League	
