= Samoa Hockey Association =

Governing body of field hockey in Samoa

The Samoa Hockey Association is the governing body for field hockey in Samoa, located in Oceania. Its headquarters are in Apia, Samoa. The association is affiliated with the International Hockey Federation (IHF) and Oceania Hockey Federation (OCF).

Faamausili Taiva Ah Young is the president of Hockey Association of Samoa and Mitimiti Falesii is the general secretary.

== See also ==
- Oceania Hockey Federation
