= Tim Bates =

Australian field hockey player

Personal information
- Full name: Timothy Bates
- Born: 9 May 1988 (age 38) Queensland, Australia

Sport
- Sport: Field hockey
- Position: Forward
National team
Years	Team	Caps	Goals
2008–2009	Australia U–21	12	(9)
2010–2013	Australia	9	(2)
Medal record
Men's field hockey
Representing Australia
FIH Junior World Cup
Bronze medal – third place	2009 Malaysia/Singapore	Team

Timothy Bates is an Australian field hockey player. He is from Queensland.

== Field hockey ==
Bates plays for the Queensland Blades in the Australian Hockey League. He played for the team in the first found of the 2011 season.

=== National team ===
In July 2011, Bates was a member of the Kookaburras team at the INSEP Challenge in Paris.

In December 2011, he was named as one of fourteen players to be on the 2012 Summer Olympics Australian men's national Olympic development squad. While this squad is not in the top twenty-eight and separate from the Olympic training coach, the Australian coach Ric Charlesworth did not rule out selecting from only the training squad, with players from the Olympic development having a chance at possibly being called up to represent Australia at the Olympics. He trained with the team from 18 January to mid-March in Perth, Western Australia.
