= Linnea Weidemann =

German field hockey player

Personal information
- Born: 15 September 2003 (age 23) Germany

Sport
- Sport: Field hockey
- Position: Defence
Senior career
Years	Team	Caps	Goals
–	HC Berliner	-	-
National team
Years	Team	Caps	Goals
2021–2022	Germany U–21	11	(0)
2022–	Germany	30	(0)
Medal record
Women's field hockey
Representing Germany
EuroHockey Championship
Silver medal – second place	2025 Mönchengladbach
Bronze medal – third place	2023 Mönchengladbach
FIH Junior World Cup
Silver medal – second place	2022 Potchefstoom

Linnea Weidemann (born 15 September 2003) is a German field hockey player.

== Personal life ==
Weidemann was born on 15 September 2003.

== Career ==
=== Domestic league ===
In the German Bundesliga, Weidemann represents HC Berliner.

=== Under–21 ===
Weidemann made her debut for the German U–21 team in 2021 during a test series against Chile in Seville.

In 2022 she won a silver medal at the FIH Junior World Cup in Potchefstroom.

=== Die Danas ===
Weidemann made her senior international debut for Die Danas in 2022 during season three of the FIH Pro League. Following her debut, she made her first appearance at a major tournament, representing Germany at the FIH World Cup in Amsterdam and Terrassa.

In 2023 Weidemann won her first medal with the national team, taking home bronze at the EuroHockey Championship in Mönchengladbach.

She has been named in the squad for the 2024 FIH Olympic Qualifiers in Ranchi.
