= 2022–23 Women's FIH Pro League =

- Dates: 4 November 2022 – 5 July 2023
- Teams: 9 (from 4 confederations)

Final positions
- Champions: Netherlands (3rd title)
- Runner-up: Argentina
- Third place: Australia

Tournament statistics
- Matches played: 72
- Goals scored: 271 (3.76 per match)
- Top scorer: (Netherlands) Yibbi Jansen (14 goals)

The 2022–23 Women's FIH Pro League was the fourth edition of the Women's FIH Pro League, a field hockey championship for women's national teams. The tournament began in November 2022 and finished in July 2023.

The Netherlands won their third title.

== Format ==
The home and away principle was kept, however the season was divided into date blocks. To assist with competition planning, international and national, several teams gathered in one venue to contest “mini-tournaments," wherein they each played two matches against one another.

If one of the two matches played between two teams was cancelled, the winner of the other match received double points.

== Teams ==
Following their withdrawal in the 2021–22 season due to COVID-19 related travel requirements, the national teams of Australia and New Zealand will rejoin for the new season.

- Argentina
- Australia
- Belgium
- China
- Germany
- Great Britain
- Netherlands
- New Zealand
- United States

== Results ==
=== Standings ===
Pos	Team	Pld	W	SOW	SOL	L	GF	GA	GD	Pts	Relegation
1st place, gold medalist(s)	Netherlands (C)	16	15	0	1	0	62	15	+47	46	
2nd place, silver medalist(s)	Argentina	16	10	0	2	4	30	17	+13	32	
3rd place, bronze medalist(s)	Australia	16	7	4	2	3	28	23	+5	31	
4	Belgium	16	8	2	2	4	35	20	+15	30	
5	Germany	16	7	3	2	4	38	29	+9	29	
6	Great Britain	16	7	0	0	9	25	34	−9	21	
7	China	16	2	1	2	11	23	37	−14	10	
8	New Zealand	16	2	1	2	11	17	48	−31	10	
9	United States (R)	16	1	2	0	13	13	48	−35	7	Relegated to 2023 FIH Nations Cup

Source: FIH
Rules for classification: 1) points; 2) matches won; 3) goal difference; 4) goals for; 5) head-to-head result; 6) field goals scored.
(C) Champion; (R) Relegated

=== Fixtures ===
All times are local.

4 November 2022
19:10

Belgium	3–3	Germany
Puvrez 1'; Raye 41'; Englebert 48'	Report	Lorenz 3'; Heinz 22'; Micheel 23'
Penalties
Versavel (penalty shoot-out missed); Englebert (penalty shoot-out scored); Ballenghien (penalty shoot-out scored); Struijk (penalty shoot-out missed); Duquesne (penalty shoot-out scored); Englebert (penalty shoot-out scored)	4–3	(penalty shoot-out scored) Strauss; (penalty shoot-out missed) Heinz; (penalty shoot-out missed) Zimmermann; (penalty shoot-out scored) Lorenz; (penalty shoot-out scored) Oruz; (penalty shoot-out missed) Strauss

Estadio Mendocino de Hockey, Mendoza
Umpires:
Catalina Montesino (CHI)
Rachel Williams (ENG)

5 November 2022
19:10

Argentina	4–2	Germany
Granatto 1', 33'; Toccalino 41'; Trinchinetti 55'	Report	Lorenz 4'; Stapenhorst 35'

Estadio Mendocino de Hockey, Mendoza
Umpires:
Catalina Montesino (CHI)
Tyler Klenk (CAN)

6 November 2022
19:10

Argentina	1–0	Belgium
Costa Biondi 28'	Report

Estadio Mendocino de Hockey, Mendoza
Umpires:
Federico García (URU)
Tyler Klenk (CAN)

7 November 2022
19:10

Germany	2–2	Belgium
Saenger 14'; Strauss 33'	Report	Versavel 10'; Ballenghien 59'
Penalties
Stoffelsma (penalty shoot-out missed); Lorenz (penalty shoot-out scored); Strauss (penalty shoot-out scored); Weidemann (penalty shoot-out scored)	3–2	(penalty shoot-out missed) Nelen; (penalty shoot-out scored) Ballenghien; (penalty shoot-out scored) Versavel; (penalty shoot-out missed) Englebert; (penalty shoot-out missed) Struijk

Estadio Mendocino de Hockey, Mendoza
Umpires:
Rachel Williams (ENG)
Bruce Bale (ENG)

8 November 2022
19:10

Argentina	2–2	Germany
Jankunas 47', 53'	Report	Stapenhorst 9'; Maertens 55'
Penalties
Ma. Fernández (penalty shoot-out missed); Andrade (penalty shoot-out missed); Thome (penalty shoot-out missed)	0–3	(penalty shoot-out missed) Oruz; (penalty shoot-out scored) Lorenz; (penalty shoot-out scored) Strauss; (penalty shoot-out scored) Weidemann

Estadio Mendocino de Hockey, Mendoza
Umpires:
Federico García (URU)
Tyler Klenk (CAN)

9 November 2022
19:10

Argentina	2–2	Belgium
Costa Biondi 29'; Jankunas 44'	Report	Struijk 32'; Ballenghien 47'
Penalties
Von der Heyde (penalty shoot-out missed); Sánchez (penalty shoot-out scored); Granatto (penalty shoot-out missed); Jankunas (penalty shoot-out missed); Albertarrio (penalty shoot-out missed)	1–2	(penalty shoot-out scored) Versavel; (penalty shoot-out missed) Ballenghien; (penalty shoot-out missed) Englebert; (penalty shoot-out scored) Breyne

Estadio Mendocino de Hockey, Mendoza
Umpires:
Federico García (URU)
Rachel Williams (ENG)

13 December 2022
19:10

Great Britain	1–2	Netherlands
Petter 12'	Report	Moes 8'; Jansen 18'

Polideportivo Provincial, Santiago del Estero
Umpires:
Laurine Delforge (BEL)
Maggie Giddens (USA)

14 December 2022
19:10

Argentina	1–3	Netherlands
Gorzelany 29'	Report	Dicke 5'; Burg 9'; Jansen 20'

Polideportivo Provincial, Santiago del Estero
Umpires:
Laurine Delforge (BEL)
Ayanna McClean (TTO)

15 December 2022
19:10

Argentina	3–0	Great Britain
Gorzelany 31'; Granatto 33'; Campoy 39'	Report

Polideportivo Provincial, Santiago del Estero
Umpires:
Federico García (URU)
Ayanna McClean (TTO)

16 December 2022
19:10

Netherlands	6–0	Great Britain
Veen 11', 52'; Albers 17'; Sanders 25'; Barentsen 46'; Welten 54'	Report

Polideportivo Provincial, Santiago del Estero
Umpires:
Ayanna McClean (TTO)
Maggie Giddens (USA)

17 December 2022
19:10

Argentina	0–2	Netherlands
	Report	Moes 31'; Jansen 58'

Polideportivo Provincial, Santiago del Estero
Umpires:
Maggie Giddens (USA)
Laurine Delforge (BEL)

18 December 2022
19:10

Argentina	1–0	Great Britain
Jankunas 2'	Report

Polideportivo Provincial, Santiago del Estero
Umpires:
Sean Rapaport (RSA)
Maggie Giddens (USA)

10 February 2023
18:40

Australia	1–1	China
Malone 29'	Report	Zhang Xin. 23'
Penalties
Colwill (penalty shoot-out scored); Williams (penalty shoot-out scored); Greiner (penalty shoot-out missed); G. Stewart (penalty shoot-out scored)	3–1	(penalty shoot-out scored) Ma N. (penalty shoot-out missed) He; (penalty shoot-out missed) Chen Y. (penalty shoot-out missed) Zou

Sydney Olympic Park Hockey Centre, Sydney
Umpires:
Kelly Hudson (NZL)
Junko Wagatsuma (JPN)

11 February 2023
16:40

China	1–2	Germany
Zhong 17'	Report	Lorenz 11'; Fleschütz 25'

Sydney Olympic Park Hockey Centre, Sydney
Umpires:
Aleisha Neumann (AUS)
Kristy Robertson (AUS)

12 February 2023
16:40

Australia	3–0	Germany
Malone 24', 24'; G. Stewart 58'	Report

Sydney Olympic Park Hockey Centre, Sydney
Umpires:
Junko Wagatsuma (JPN)
Kelly Hudson (NZL)

13 February 2023
18:40

Australia	2–2	China
Claxton 52'; Peris 57'	Report	Zhong 37'; Gu B. 48'
Penalties
Schonell (penalty shoot-out scored); Malone (penalty shoot-out missed); Peris (penalty shoot-out scored); Nobbs (penalty shoot-out scored); Lawton (penalty shoot-out scored)	4–3	(penalty shoot-out scored) Liang; (penalty shoot-out scored) Zhong; (penalty shoot-out missed) Li H. (penalty shoot-out scored) Zou; (penalty shoot-out missed) Liu C.

Sydney Olympic Park Hockey Centre, Sydney
Umpires:
Kelly Hudson (NZL)
Kristy Robertson (AUS)

14 February 2023
18:40

Germany	3–0	China
Horn 49'; Stapenhorst 53'; Lorenz 54'	Report

Sydney Olympic Park Hockey Centre, Sydney
Umpires:
Kristy Robertson (AUS)
Aleisha Neumann (AUS)

15 February 2023
18:40

Australia	3–3	Germany
Fitzpatrick 1'; Peris 22'; Kershaw 54'	Report	Pieper 8'; Fleschütz 46'; Strauss 57'
Penalties
Schonell (penalty shoot-out missed); Kershaw (penalty shoot-out missed); Malone (penalty shoot-out scored); Nobbs (penalty shoot-out missed); Peris (penalty shoot-out missed)	1–2	(penalty shoot-out missed) Weidemann; (penalty shoot-out scored) Lorenz; (penalty shoot-out missed) Strauss; (penalty shoot-out scored) Schröder; (penalty shoot-out missed) Huse

Sydney Olympic Park Hockey Centre, Sydney
Umpires:
Junko Wagatsuma (JPN)
Aleisha Neumann (AUS)

18 February 2023
15:10

New Zealand	1–1	United States
Dickins 60'	Report	Caarls 21'
Penalties
Doar (penalty shoot-out missed); Ralph (penalty shoot-out missed); Tynan (penalty shoot-out missed); Hull (penalty shoot-out missed)	0–2	(penalty shoot-out missed) Lepage; (penalty shoot-out scored) Crouse; (penalty shoot-out scored) Sessa; (penalty shoot-out missed) Yeager

National Hockey Stadium, Wellington
Umpires:
Junko Wagatsuma (JPN)
Cookie Tan (SGP)

19 February 2023
15:10

New Zealand	1–1	China
Shannon 33'	Report	Xu Y. 33'
Penalties
Doar (penalty shoot-out missed); Ralph (penalty shoot-out missed); Merry (penalty shoot-out missed); Hull (penalty shoot-out missed); Jaques (penalty shoot-out scored)	1–2	(penalty shoot-out missed) Chen Y. (penalty shoot-out missed) Zhong; (penalty shoot-out scored) Zou; (penalty shoot-out missed) Zhang Xia. (penalty shoot-out scored) He

National Hockey Stadium, Wellington
Umpires:
Amber Church (NZL)
Cookie Tan (SGP)

20 February 2023
16:10

China	4–1	United States
Gu Y. 11'; Gu B. 33', 57', 59'	Report	Golini 53'

National Hockey Stadium, Wellington
Umpires:
Amber Church (NZL)
Junko Wagatsuma (JPN)

24 February 2023
16:10

United States	2–0	China
Caarls 28'; Golini 33'	Report

National Hockey Stadium, Wellington
Umpires:
Rachel Williams (ENG)
Cookie Tan (SGP)

25 February 2023
15:10

New Zealand	4–1	United States
Hull 5', 57'; Shannon 33'; H. Cotter 55'	Report	Crouse 20'

National Hockey Stadium, Wellington
Umpires:
Rachel Williams (ENG)
Junko Wagatsuma (JPN)

26 February 2023
15:10

New Zealand	2–5	China
Merry 21'; H. Cotter 43'	Report	Gu B. 9'; Zhang Xia. 23'; Chen 27', 53'; Liang 55'

National Hockey Stadium, Wellington
Umpires:
David Tomlinson (NZL)
Cookie Tan (SGP)

28 February 2023
17:10

Australia	2–0	Argentina
Cullum-Sanders 2'; Taylor 18'	Report

Tasmanian Hockey Centre, Hobart
Umpires:
Rachel Williams (ENG)
Cookie Tan (SGP)

1 March 2023
17:10

Australia	0–0	United States
	Report
Penalties
Cullum-Sanders (penalty shoot-out scored); A. Wilson (penalty shoot-out missed); Tonkin (penalty shoot-out missed); Young (penalty shoot-out missed)	1–3	(penalty shoot-out missed) Lepage; (penalty shoot-out missed) Golini; (penalty shoot-out scored) Crouse; (penalty shoot-out scored) Sessa; (penalty shoot-out scored) De Vries

Tasmanian Hockey Centre, Hobart
Umpires:
Rachel Williams (ENG)
Cookie Tan (SGP)

2 March 2023
17:10

Argentina	3–0	United States
Gorzelany 10'; Cairó 23'; Granatto 45'	Report

Tasmanian Hockey Centre, Hobart
Umpires:
Rachel Williams (ENG)
Cookie Tan (SGP)

3 March 2023
19:10

Australia	0–1	Argentina
	Report	Von der Heyde 48'

Tasmanian Hockey Centre, Hobart
Umpires:
Cookie Tan (SGP)
Raghu Prasad (IND)

4 March 2023
19:10

Australia	2–1	United States
Colwill 4'; Lawton 58'	Report	Hoffman 22'

Tasmanian Hockey Centre, Hobart
Umpires:
Rachel Williams (ENG)
Javed Shaikh (IND)

5 March 2023
19:10

United States	0–3	Argentina
	Report	Granatto 18', 56'; Thome Gustavino 40'

Tasmanian Hockey Centre, Hobart
Umpires:
Rachel Williams (ENG)
Cookie Tan (SGP)

22 April 2023
14:10

Australia	0–1	Great Britain
	Report	Ansley 13'

Ngā Puna Wai Sports Hub, Christchurch
Umpires:
Emi Yamada (JPN)
Amber Church (NZL)

23 April 2023
16:40

New Zealand	0–2	Great Britain
	Report	Howard 9', 23'

Ngā Puna Wai Sports Hub, Christchurch
Umpires:
Aleisha Neumann (AUS)
Emi Yamada (JPN)

25 April 2023
14:10

New Zealand	1–2	Australia
Shannon 6'	Report	Brooks 49'; A. Wilson 58'

Ngā Puna Wai Sports Hub, Christchurch
Umpires:
Amber Church (NZL)
Aleisha Neumann (AUS)

28 April 2023
17:10

Great Britain	1–3	Australia
Howard 10'	Report	Greiner 30', 55'; Taylor 36'

Ngā Puna Wai Sports Hub, Christchurch
Umpires:
Emi Yamada (JPN)
Amber Church (NZL)

29 April 2023
14:10

New Zealand	1–6	Great Britain
K. Cotter 28'	Report	Petter 2'; Bourne 4'; Balsdon 20'; Howard 51'; Martin 55'; Ansley 60'

Ngā Puna Wai Sports Hub, Christchurch
Umpires:
Aleisha Neumann (AUS)
Emi Yamada (JPN)

30 April 2023
16:40

New Zealand	1–2	Australia
Merry 14'	Report	Schonell 45', 50'

Ngā Puna Wai Sports Hub, Christchurch
Umpires:
Amber Church (NZL)
Aleisha Neumann (AUS)

26 May 2023
17:10

Great Britain	1–0	China
Martin 39'	Report

Lee Valley Hockey Stadium, London
Umpires:
Ayanna McClean (TTO)
Wanri Venter (RSA)

27 May 2023
15:10

Belgium	3–1	China
Blockmans 11'; White 19'; Versavel 48'	Report	Gu B. 42'

Lee Valley Hockey Stadium, London
Umpires:
Lim Hong-Zhen (SGP)
Wanri Venter (RSA)

28 May 2023
15:10

Great Britain	2–3	Belgium
Balsdon 8'; Ansley 48'	Report	White 23', 25'; Bonami 34'

Lee Valley Hockey Stadium, London
Umpires:
Ahmed El-Sayed (EGY)
Wanri Venter (RSA)

2 June 2023
17:10

Great Britain	4–3	China
Owsley 2'; Martin 5', 40'; Robertson 20'	Report	Gu B. 10'; Zhang Xin. 50'; Zou 51'

Lee Valley Hockey Stadium, London
Umpires:
Ahmed El-Sayed (EGY)
Ayanna McClean (TTO)

3 June 2023
15:10

China	1–3	Belgium
Liu C. 52'	Report	Rasir 12'; White 26'; Vanden Borre 54'

Lee Valley Hockey Stadium, London
Umpires:
Ayanna McClean (TTO)
Sean Rapaport (RSA)

4 June 2023
15:10

Great Britain	0–3	Belgium
	Report	Gerniers 48'; Englebert 52', 54'

Lee Valley Hockey Stadium, London
Umpires:
Ayanna McClean (TTO)
Wanri Venter (RSA)

7 June 2023
16:10

Netherlands	4–0	China
Albers 3'; Fokke 4'; Veen 43'; Burg 45'	Report

HC Oranje-Rood, Eindhoven
Umpires:
Hannah Harrison (ENG)
Sarah Wilson (SCO)

8 June 2023
20:40

Netherlands	7–2	Australia
Jansen 12', 22', 58'; Matla 16', 49'; Dicke 21', 48'	Report	Malone 4', 40'

HC Oranje-Rood, Eindhoven
Umpires:
Laurine Delforge (BEL)
Céline Martin-Schmets (BEL)

9 June 2023
18:10

Argentina	2–1	China
Thome 37'; Raposo 60'	Report	Zhang X. 52'

HC Oranje-Rood, Eindhoven
Umpires:
Hannah Harrison (ENG)
Céline Martin-Schmets (BEL)

10 June 2023
17:40

Netherlands	4–2	China
Dicke 19'; Jansen 25', 53'; Matla 42'	Report	He 19'; Zao 34'

HC Oranje-Rood, Eindhoven
Umpires:
Laurine Delforge (BEL)
Sarah Wilson (SCO)

11 June 2023
17:40

Netherlands	3–3	Australia
Verschoor 6'; Jansen 20'; Albers 29'	Report	Peris 15'; Malone 22'; Brooks 28'
Penalties
Matla (penalty shoot-out missed); De Waard (penalty shoot-out scored); Veen (penalty shoot-out missed); Moes (penalty shoot-out missed); Verschoor (penalty shoot-out missed)	1–2	(penalty shoot-out missed) Schonell; (penalty shoot-out scored) Malone; (penalty shoot-out scored) Kershaw; (penalty shoot-out missed) Nobbs

HC Oranje-Rood, Eindhoven
Umpires:
Ben Göntgen (GER)
Céline Martin-Schmets (BEL)

12 June 2023
18:10

China	1–2	Argentina
Zhang Y. 26'	Report	Piccardo 21'; Costa Biondi 58'

HC Oranje-Rood, Eindhoven
Umpires:
Hannah Harrison (ENG)
Sarah Wilson (SCO)

16 June 2023
12:40

Great Britain	0–2	Germany
	Report	Wenzel 51'; Heinz 56'

Lee Valley Hockey Stadium, London
Umpires:
Alison Keogh (IRL)
Céline Martin-Schmets (BEL)

16 June 2023
20:10

Belgium	0–2	Australia
	Report	Schonell 8'; Malone 35'

Wilrijkse Plein, Antwerp
Umpires:
Annelize Rostron (RSA)
Liu Xiaoying (CHN)

17 June 2023
12:40

Netherlands	6–0	United States
Dicke 7', 50'; Burg 20'; Van Laarhoven 49'; Veen 54'; Fokke 58'	Report

Lee Valley Hockey Stadium, London
Umpires:
Céline Martin-Schmets (BEL)
Tyler Klenk (CAN)

17 June 2023
14:10

Argentina	1–2	New Zealand
Costa Biondi 20'	Report	Shannon 11'; Ralph 44'

Wilrijkse Plein, Antwerp
Umpires:
Liu Xiaoying (CHN)
Michelle Meister (GER)

18 June 2023
12:40

Great Britain	4–2	United States
Crackles 4'; Hamilton 10'; Watson 23', 29'	Report	Tamer 25'; Sessa 27'

Lee Valley Hockey Stadium, London
Umpires:
Alison Keogh (IRL)
Germán Montes de Oca (ARG)

18 June 2023
14:10

Belgium	7–0	New Zealand
Marien 6', 47'; Vanden Borre 7'; Englebert 42'; White 54', 58'; Versavel 56'	Report

Wilrijkse Plein, Antwerp
Umpires:
Coen van Bunge (NED)
Annelize Rostron (RSA)

19 June 2023
20:10

Great Britain	1–4	Germany
Rayer 23'	Report	Granitzki 1'; Fleschütz 6'; Huse 33'; Heinz 58'

Lee Valley Hockey Stadium, London
Umpires:
Germán Montes de Oca (ARG)
Céline Martin-Schmets (BEL)

19 June 2023
20:40

Belgium	1–1	Australia
Vanden Borre 27'	Report	Kershaw 10'
Penalties
Englebert (penalty shoot-out missed); Versavel (penalty shoot-out scored); Rasir (penalty shoot-out scored); Breyne (penalty shoot-out missed); Blockmans (penalty shoot-out missed); Rasir (penalty shoot-out missed)	2–3	(penalty shoot-out missed) Kershaw; (penalty shoot-out scored) Malone; (penalty shoot-out scored) Lawton; (penalty shoot-out missed) Nobbs; (penalty shoot-out missed) Peris; (penalty shoot-out scored) Nobbs

Wilrijkse Plein, Antwerp
Umpires:
Annelize Rostron (RSA)
Michelle Meister (GER)

20 June 2023
14:40

United States	2–3	Netherlands
Tamer 2'; Rodgers 36'	Report	Burg 39', 42'; Van Laarhoven 56'

Lee Valley Hockey Stadium, London
Umpires:
Alison Keogh (IRL)
Céline Martin-Schmets (BEL)

20 June 2023
18:10

New Zealand	0–4	Argentina
	Report	Alonso 15'; Albertario 42'; Toccalino 50'; Costa Biondi 56'

Wilrijkse Plein, Antwerp
Umpires:
Liu Xiaoying (CHN)
Annelize Rostron (RSA)

21 June 2023
18:10

Belgium	2–1	New Zealand
Vanden Borre 1'; White 16'	Report	White 57'

Wilrijkse Plein, Antwerp
Umpires:
Michelle Meister (GER)
Liu Xiaoying (CHN)

21 June 2023
20:10

Great Britain	2–1	United States
Hamilton 22'; Owsley 58'	Report	Caarls 45'

Lee Valley Hockey Stadium, London
Umpires:
Tyler Klenk (CAN)
Céline Martin-Schmets (BEL)

23 June 2023
19:40

Netherlands	5–0	Germany
Matla 9'; Jansen 18', 23'; Burg 55', 55'	Report

Wagener Stadium, Amsterdam
Umpires:
Annelize Rostron (RSA)
Liu Xiaoying (CHN)

24 June 2023
15:10

Netherlands	4–1	New Zealand
Matla 2'; Dicke 17'; Barentsen 20'; Veen 41'	Report	H. Cotter 56'

Wagener Stadium, Amsterdam
Umpires:
Liu Xiaoying (CHN)
Irene Presenqui (ARG)

25 June 2023
17:40

Germany	3–1	New Zealand
Granitzki 2'; Zimmermann 41'; Micheel 50'	Report	H. Cotter 34'

Wagener Stadium, Amsterdam
Umpires:
Gabriel Labate (ARG)
Annelize Rostron (RSA)

26 June 2023
19:40

Netherlands	2–1	Germany
Sanders 45'; Dicke 55'	Report	Huse 58'

Wagener Stadium, Amsterdam
Umpires:
Irene Presenqui (ARG)
Annelize Rostron (RSA)

27 June 2023
17:10

Netherlands	7–1	New Zealand
Jansen 3'; De Waard 5'; Burg 8'; Zandee 37', 51'; Matla 40', 59'	Report	Merry 31'

Wagener Stadium, Amsterdam
Umpires:
Jonas van't Hek (NED)
Liu Xiaoying (CHN)

28 June 2023
17:10

New Zealand	0–0	Germany
	Report
Penalties
Merry (penalty shoot-out scored); Ralph (penalty shoot-out missed); Hull (penalty shoot-out scored); Tynan (penalty shoot-out scored)	3–1	(penalty shoot-out missed) Heinz; (penalty shoot-out missed) Micheel; (penalty shoot-out missed) Strauss; (penalty shoot-out scored) Zimmermann

Wagener Stadium, Amsterdam
Umpires:
Liu Xiaoying (CHN)
Irene Presenqui (ARG)

30 June 2023
18:10

Germany	6–0	United States
Nolte 1'; Wiedermann 9', 59'; Oruz 26'; Stapenhorst 28', 42'	Report

Wilrijkse Plein, Antwerp
Umpires:
Sarah Wilson (SCO)
Irene Presenqui (ARG)

1 July 2023
14:10

Belgium	0–2	Netherlands
	Report	De Waard 53'; Matla 60'

Wilrijkse Plein, Antwerp
Umpires:
Irene Presenqui (ARG)
Alison Keogh (IRL)

2 July 2023
16:40

Belgium	4–0	United States
Vanden Borre 5', 51'; Marien 24'; Englebert 55'	Report

Wilrijkse Plein, Antwerp
Umpires:
Sarah Wilson (SCO)
Alison Keogh (IRL)

3 July 2023
18:10

United States	2–5	Germany
Golini 48'; Grega 57'	Report	Heinz 5'; Stapenhorst 6'; Micheel 42'; Fleschütz 47'; Strauss 60'

Wilrijkse Plein, Antwerp
Umpires:
Irene Presenqui (ARG)
Michiel Otten (NED)

4 July 2023
18:10

Belgium	1–2	Netherlands
Marien 41'	Report	Jansen 45', 52'

Wilrijkse Plein, Antwerp
Umpires:
Alison Keogh (IRL)
Michiel Otten (NED)

5 July 2023
20:40

Belgium	1–0	United States
Bonami 22'	Report

Wilrijkse Plein, Antwerp
Umpires:
Irene Presenqui (ARG)
Sarah Wilson (SCO)

== Goalscorers ==
There were 271 goals scored in 72 matches, for an average of 3.76 goals per match.

14 goals

- (Netherlands) Yibbi Jansen

8 goals

- (Netherlands) Pien Dicke
- (Netherlands) Joosje Burg
- (Netherlands) Frédérique Matla

7 goals

- (Australia) Ambrosia Malone
- (Belgium) Emily White
- (China) Gu Bingfeng

6 goals

- (Argentina) María Granatto
- (Belgium) Stéphanie Vanden Borre
- (Germany) Charlotte Stapenhorst

5 goals

- (Argentina) Valentina Costa Biondi
- (Belgium) Charlotte Englebert
- (Netherlands) Marijn Veen

4 goals

- (Argentina) Julieta Jankunas
- (Belgium) Delphine Marien
- (Germany) Jette Fleschütz
- (Germany) Pauline Heinz
- (Germany) Nike Lorenz
- (United Kingdom) Tessa Howard
- (United Kingdom) Hannah Martin
- (New Zealand) Hannah Cotter
- (New Zealand) Olivia Shannon

3 goals

- (Argentina) Agustina Gorzelany
- (Australia) Brooke Peris
- (Australia) Courtney Schonell
- (Belgium) Louise Versavel
- (Germany) Lena Micheel
- (Germany) Sara Strauss
- (United Kingdom) Giselle Ansley
- (Netherlands) Felice Albers
- (New Zealand) Olivia Merry
- (United States) Sanne Caarls
- (United States) Amanda Golini

2 goals

- (Argentina) Delfina Thome
- (Argentina) Sofia Toccalino
- (Australia) Maddison Brooks
- (Australia) Rebecca Greiner
- (Australia) Stephanie Kershaw
- (Australia) Renee Taylor
- (Belgium) Ambre Ballenghien
- (Belgium) Astrid Bonami
- (China) Chen Yang
- (China) Zhang Xiaoxue
- (China) Zhang Xindan
- (China) Zhong Jiaqi
- (China) Zou Meirong
- (Germany) Hanna Granitzki
- (Germany) Viktoria Huse
- (Germany) Felicia Wiedermann
- (United Kingdom) Grace Balsdon
- (United Kingdom) Sophie Hamilton
- (United Kingdom) Lily Owsley
- (United Kingdom) Isabelle Petter
- (United Kingdom) Charlotte Watson
- (Netherlands) Marente Barentsen
- (Netherlands) Luna Fokke
- (Netherlands) Renée van Laarhoven
- (Netherlands) Freeke Moes
- (Netherlands) Pien Sanders
- (Netherlands) Xan de Waard
- (Netherlands) Elzemiek Zandee
- (New Zealand) Megan Hull
- (United States) Abigail Tamer

1 goal

- (Argentina) Agustina Albertario
- (Argentina) Agostina Alonso
- (Argentina) Sofía Cairó
- (Argentina) Pilar Campoy
- (Argentina) Lucina von der Heyde
- (Argentina) Alina Piccardo
- (Argentina) Eugenia Trinchinetti
- (Argentina) Valentina Raposo
- (Australia) Jane Claxton
- (Australia) Claire Colwill
- (Australia) Hannah Cullum-Sanders
- (Australia) Madison Fitzpatrick
- (Australia) Amy Lawton
- (Australia) Grace Stewart
- (Australia) Abigail Wilson
- (Belgium) Vanessa Blockmans
- (Belgium) Alix Gerniers
- (Belgium) Emma Puvrez
- (Belgium) Justine Rasir
- (Belgium) Abigail Raye
- (Belgium) Michelle Struijk
- (China) Gu Yangyan
- (China) He Jiangxin
- (China) Liang Meiyu
- (China) Liu Chencheng
- (China) Xu Yanan
- (China) Zhang Ying
- (Germany) Kira Horn
- (Germany) Pia Maertens
- (Germany) Lisa Nolte
- (Germany) Selin Oruz
- (Germany) Cécile Pieper
- (Germany) Laura Saenger
- (Germany) Benedetta Wenzel
- (Germany) Sonja Zimmermann
- (United Kingdom) Darcy Bourne
- (United Kingdom) Fiona Crackles
- (United Kingdom) Elena Rayer
- (United Kingdom) Sarah Robertson
- (Netherlands) Maria Verschoor
- (Netherlands) Lidewij Welten
- (New Zealand) Kaitlin Cotter
- (New Zealand) Stephanie Dickins
- (New Zealand) Hope Ralph
- (New Zealand) Tayla White
- (United States) Leah Crouse
- (United States) Danielle Grega
- (United States) Ashley Hoffman
- (United States) Megan Rodgers
- (United States) Ashley Sessa

Source: FIH

== See also ==
- 2022–23 Men's FIH Pro League
