= Australia women's national under-21 field hockey team =

Australia
- Nickname(s): Jillaroos
- Association: Hockey Australia
- Confederation: OHF (Oceania)
- Head Coach: Stacia Strain
- Assistant coach(es): Mark Hager
- Manager: Joanne Banning; Angela Lambert
- Captain: Claire Colwill

FIH ranking
- Current: 5

Junior World Cup
- Appearances: 9 (first in 1993)
- Best result: (silver) 2nd (1993, 1997)
Medal record
Junior World Cup
Silver medal – second place	1993 Terrassa
Silver medal – second place	1997 Seongnam
Bronze medal – third place	2001 Buenos Aires
Bronze medal – third place	2016 Santiago

The Australia women's national under-21 field hockey team, represents Australia in international under-21 field hockey and at the Junior World Cup. The team is controlled by the governing body for field hockey in Australia, Hockey Australia, which is currently a member of the Oceania Hockey Federation (OHF) and the International Hockey Federation (FIH). The team's official nickname is the Jillaroos.

The team's first recorded appearance was at the 1993 Junior World Cup, where the team won a silver medal.

The team's last appearance was at the 2026 Women's Junior Oceania Cup against New Zealand in Redcliffe from 1–4 October 2026.

== History ==
=== Tournament Records ===
Junior World Cup
Year	Location	Position	Pld	W	D	L	GF	GA	GD	Pts
1989	Ottawa, Canada	Did not participate								
1993	Terrassa, Spain	2nd	7	4	1	2	27	8	+19	9
1997	Seongnam, South Korea	2nd	7	6	0	1	24	10	+14	18
2001	Buenos Aires, Argentina	3rd	7	6	0	1	12	4	+8	18
2005	Santiago, Chile	4th	8	4	1	3	14	9	+5	13
2009	Boston, United States	5th	7	5	1	1	22	9	+13	16
2013	Mönchengladbach, Germany	6th	6	3	1	2	19	7	+12	10
2016	Santiago, Chile	3rd	6	3	2	1	20	9	+11	11
2022	Potchefstroom, South Africa	Did not participate								
2023	Santiago, Chile	5th	6	4	1	1	12	5	+7	13
2025	Santiago, Chile	7th	6	4	0	2	19	11	+8	12
2027	TBD	Qualified								

Junior Oceania Cup
Year	Location	Position	Pld	W	D	L	GF	GA	GD	Pts
2000	Canberra, Australia	1st	3	2	1	0	6	3	+3	7
2004	(Australia) Wellington, New Zealand	1st	3	2	0	1	10	5	+5	6
2008	Brisbane, Australia	1st	3	2	0	1	9	5	+4	6
2013	Gold Coast, Australia	1st	3	3	0	0	10	4	+6	9
2016	Gold Coast, Australia	1st	3	3	0	0	9	4	+5	9
2022	Canberra, Australia	1st	3	2	1	0	9	4	+5	7
2025	Auckland, New Zealand	1st	3	2	1	0	9	5	+4	7
2026	Redcliffe, Australia	1st	3	3	0	0	11	2	+9	9

== Team ==
=== Current squad ===
The following players were named in the squad for the 2023 FIH Junior World Cup in Santiago.

No.	Pos.	Player	Date of birth (age)	Caps	Goals	Club
26	GK	Jordan Bliss	8 September 2003 (age 23)	6	0	(Queensland) Brisbane Blaze
27	GK	Bridget Laurance	16 November 2002 (age 23)	7	0	(Tasmania) HC Melbourne
4	DF	Karissa van der Wath	7 July 2006 (age 20)	6	0	Hockey Queensland
8	DF	Alana Kavanagh	24 March 2003 (age 23)	12	0	(New South Wales) NSW Pride
12	DF	Emily Hamilton-Smith	19 March 2002 (age 24)	13	0	(Victoria (state)) HC Melbourne
13	DF	Jade Reid	9 July 2002 (age 24)	10	0	(Western Australia) Perth Thundersticks
17	DF	Lucy Sharman	24 May 2003 (age 23)	10	0	(South Australia) Adelaide Fire
22	DF	Tatum Stewart	22 February 2002 (age 24)	9	8	(Queensland) Brisbane Blaze
2	MF	Grace Young	23 August 2002 (age 24)	6	1	(New South Wales) NSW Pride
3	MF	Maddison Brooks	23 September 2004 (age 22)	8	1	(Tasmania) Tassie Tigers
5	MF	Claire Colwill	19 September 2003 (age 23)	9	0	(Queensland) Brisbane Blaze
9	MF	Amy Lawton	19 January 2002 (age 24)	9	3	(Victoria (state)) HC Melbourne
10	MF	Josie Lawton	5 October 2004 (age 22)	12	1	(Victoria (state)) HC Melbourne
1	FW	Hannah Cullum-Sanders	30 July 2003 (age 23)	6	3	(Queensland) Brisbane Blaze
6	FW	Madeline Kenny	6 February 2004 (age 22)	9	1	(Queensland) Brisbane Blaze
7	FW	Makayla Jones	20 July 2004 (age 22)	13	4	(New South Wales) NSW Pride
18	FW	Katie Sharkey	22 December 2004 (age 21)	10	0	(South Australia) Adelaide Fire
21	FW	Lily Neilson	12 May 2002 (age 24)	6	0	(New South Wales) Hockey NSW

=== Recent call-ups ===
The following players have received call-ups to the team in the last 12 months.

Pos.	Player	Date of birth (age)	Caps	Goals	Club	Latest call-up
GK	Evie Dalton	30 November 2001 (age 24)	3	0	(Tasmania) Tassie Tigers	vs. New Zealand; 11 December 2022
DF	Hannah Kable	19 March 2001 (age 25)	3	0	(New South Wales) NSW Pride	vs. New Zealand; 11 December 2022
DF	Jolie Sertorio	25 December 2001 (age 24)	6	0	(Western Australia) Perth Thundersticks	vs. New Zealand; 11 December 2022
MF	Gracie Geddis	30 October 2001 (age 24)	3	0	(Victoria (state)) HC Melbourne	vs. New Zealand; 11 December 2022
FW	Jade Smith	16 February 2001 (age 25)	3	0	(Queensland) Brisbane Blaze	vs. New Zealand; 11 December 2022
FW	Ruby Harris	24 June 2001 (age 25)	3	2	(Queensland) Brisbane Blaze	vs. New Zealand; 11 December 2022
FW	Georgina West	15 June 2004 (age 22)	3	0	(Western Australia) Perth Thundersticks	vs. New Zealand; 11 December 2022
FW	Neasa Flynn	13 August 2001 (age 25)	3	1	(Western Australia) Perth Thundersticks	vs. New Zealand; 11 December 2022
FW	Ciara Utri	6 April 2001 (age 25)	3	0	(Victoria (state)) HC Melbourne	vs. New Zealand; 11 December 2022

== Results ==
=== Latest Results ===
==== FIH Junior World Cup ====
2 December 2025 Pool E	Australia	6–1	Canada	Santiago, Chile
13:30	Lawton 5'; Mathison 15'; Jones 16', 60'; Howell 25'; Surha 34'	Report	Girgis 42'	Stadium: Centro Deportivo de Hockey Césped

4 December 2025 Pool E	Spain	2–4	Australia	Santiago, Chile
18:00	Zubizarreta 40'; Vilanova 47'	Report	Surha 15+'; Jones 18'; Kenny 26'; Howell 39'	Stadium: Centro Deportivo de Hockey Césped

6 December 2025 Pool E	Australia	3–0	Scotland	Santiago, Chile
13:30	Surha 11'; Stansby 15'; Kenny 49'	Report		Stadium: Centro Deportivo de Hockey Césped

8 December 2025 Quarter-final	Australia	3–5	China	Santiago, Chile
18:00	Kenny 4'; Jones 52', 55'	Report	Wang L. 4', 28', 31'; Nie 31'; Zuo 42'	Stadium: Centro Deportivo de Hockey Césped

10 December 2025 Crossover	Germany	1–0	Australia	Santiago, Chile
15:45	Haid 11'	Report		Stadium: Centro Deportivo de Hockey Césped

12 December 2025 Seventh Place Match	England	2–3	Australia	Santiago, Chile
13:30	Dyson 28'; Boss 42'	Report	Howell 38', 40'; Love 41'	Stadium: Centro Deportivo de Hockey Césped

==== Junior Oceania Cup ====
1 October 2026 Match 1	Australia	5–1	New Zealand	Redcliffe, Australia
14:00	Bradley 1', 42'; Dorman 9'; Kovacevich 17'; Woodger 30'		Findlay 26'	Stadium: Redcliffe Hockey Club

3 October 2026 Match 2	Australia	1–3	New Zealand	Redcliffe, Australia
16:00	Brown 54'		Bradley 4'; Nash 45'; Van der Wath 59'	Stadium: Redcliffe Hockey Club

4 October 2026 Match 3	Australia	3–0	New Zealand	Redcliffe, Australia
14:00	Mathison 51'; Bradley 54', 57'			Stadium: Redcliffe Hockey Club
