= Junior Oceania Cup =

International field hockey competition

- Sport: Field hockey
- Founded: 2000; 26 years ago
- No. of teams: 2–4
- Continent: OHF (Oceania)
- Most recent champions: M: Australia (7th title); W: Australia (8th title)
- Most titles: M: Australia (7 titles); W: Australia (8 titles)

The Junior Oceania Cup is an international men's and women's under-21 field hockey competition organised by the Oceania Hockey Federation (OHF). It is held quadrennially to determine which teams will receive an automatic berth to the men's and women's Junior World Cups.

Australia are the most recent champions in both the men's and women's tournaments, defeating the national under-21 sides from New Zealand in each division.

== Men's tournament ==
=== Summaries ===
Year	Final host	Final			Third place match		
Year	Final host	Champions	Score	Runners-up	Third place	Score	Fourth place
2004; Details	Wellington, New Zealand	Australia	Round Robin	New Zealand	Only Two Teams		
2008; Details	Brisbane, Australia	Australia	Round Robin	New Zealand	Only Two Teams		
2013; Details	Gold Coast, Australia	Australia	4–2	New Zealand	Vanuatu	2–1	Papua New Guinea
2016; Details	Gold Coast, Australia	Australia	Round Robin	New Zealand	Only Two Teams		
2022; Details	Canberra, Australia	Australia	Round Robin	New Zealand	Only Two Teams		
2025; Details	Auckland, New Zealand	Australia	Round Robin	New Zealand	Only Two Teams		
2026; Details	Redcliffe, Australia	Australia	Round Robin	New Zealand	Only Two Teams		

== Women's tournament ==
=== Summaries ===
Year	Final host	Final			Third place match		
Year	Final host	Champions	Score	Runners-up	Third place	Score	Fourth place
2000; Details	Canberra, Australia	Australia	Round Robin	New Zealand	Only two teams		
2004; Details	Wellington, New Zealand	Australia	Round Robin	New Zealand	Only two teams		
2008; Details	Brisbane, Australia	Australia	Round Robin	New Zealand	Only two teams		
2013; Details	Gold Coast, Australia	Australia	Round Robin	New Zealand	Only two teams		
2016; Details	Gold Coast, Australia	Australia	Round Robin	New Zealand	Only two teams		
2022; Details	Canberra, Australia	Australia	Round Robin	New Zealand	Only two teams		
2025; Details	Auckland, New Zealand	Australia	Round Robin	New Zealand	Only two teams		
2026; Details	Redcliffe, Australia	Australia	Round Robin	New Zealand	Only two teams		
