= Oceania Hockey Federation =

Governing body for field hockey in Oceania

- Abbreviation: OHF
- Formation: 1954; 72 years ago
- Type: Sports federation
- Headquarters: Barwon Heads, Victoria
- Region served: Oceania
- Members: 8 member associations
- President: (Australia) Cameron Vale
- Parent organisation: International Hockey Federation
- Website: oceaniahockey.com

The Oceania Hockey Federation is the governing body for the sport of field hockey in Oceania. It organises the Men's Oceania Cup and Women's Oceania Cup. It is affiliated with the International Hockey Federation (FIH).

== Member associations ==
- Australia
- Fiji
- New Zealand
- Papua New Guinea
- Samoa
- Solomon Islands
- Tonga
- Vanuatu

== National team rankings ==
Men's FIH Rankings as of 18 June 2026
OHF	FIH	Change	Team	Points
1	4	▼1	Australia	3349.18
2	11	Steady	New Zealand	2633.37
3	59	Steady	Papua New Guinea	1316
4	64	Steady	Solomon Islands	1284
5	65	▲1	Tonga	1275
6	66	▲1	Vanuatu	1274
7	69	▲1	Fiji	1264
8	76	▲1	Samoa	1248
Change from 9 March 2026

Women's FIH Rankings as of 11 June 2026
OHF	FIH	Change	Team	Points
1	8	Steady	Australia	2711.9
2	10	Steady	New Zealand	2590.77
3	47	▲1	Fiji	1222.5
4	52	▼1	Papua New Guinea	1196.25
5	54	▼3	Solomon Islands	1191.5
6	56	▼3	Tonga	1179.5
7	64	▼3	Samoa	1133.75
8	65	▼1	Vanuatu	1130
Change from 10 March 2026
