= 2024–25 Men's FIH Hockey Nations Cup =

Hockey tournament in Kuala Lumpur

Tournament details
- Host country: Malaysia
- City: Kuala Lumpur
- Dates: 15–21 June 2025
- Teams: 8 (from 4 confederations)
- Venue: Malaysia National Hockey Stadium

Final positions
- Champions: New Zealand (2nd title)
- Runner-up: Pakistan
- Third place: France

Tournament statistics
- Matches played: 20
- Goals scored: 113 (5.65 per match)
- Top scorer: (France) Victor Charlet (7 goals)
- Best player: (New Zealand) Nic Woods
- Best young player: (Pakistan) Sufyan Khan
- Best goalkeeper: (New Zealand) Dominic Dixon

The 2024–25 Men's FIH Hockey Nations Cup was the third edition of the Men's FIH Hockey Nations Cup, the annual qualification tournament for the Men's FIH Pro League organised by the International Hockey Federation. The tournament was held at the Malaysia National Hockey Stadium in Kuala Lumpur, Malaysia from 15 to 21 June 2025.

The defending champions New Zealand won their second title by defeating Pakistan 6–2 in the final. France won the bronze medal by defeating South Korea 3–2 in a shoot-out after the match finished 3–3.

== Teams ==
The eight highest ranked teams not participating in the Men's FIH Pro League participated in the tournament.

France

Head Coach: (Belgium) John-John Dohmen

1. Edgar Reynaud (GK)
3. Mattéo Desgouillons
4. Brieuc Delemazure
6. Corentin Sellier
7. Lucas Montécot
8. Xavier Esmenjaud
10. Viktor Lockwood (C)
11. Noé Jouin
12. Gaspard Xavier
16. François Goyet
18. Eliot Curty
19. Jules Verrier
21. Etienne Tynevez
24. Amaury Bellenger
26. Victor Saint-Martin
30. Tassilo Sura
31. Corentin Saunier (GK)
95. Louis Haertelmeyer
Japan

Head Coach: Yoshihiro Anai

1. Koji Yamasaki
2. Shota Yamada
4. Yamato Kawahara
5. Seren Tanaka
7. Jun Watanabe
11. Kazumasa Matsumoto
12. Yuma Nagai
13. Manabu Yamashita
14. Raiki Fujishima (C)
19. Ryoma Ooka
22. Kaito Tanaka
23. Yusuke Kawamura
24. Kosei Kawabe
30. Takashi Yoshikawa (GK)
31. Kisho Kuroda (GK)
34. Keita Watanabe
35. Ryosuke Shinohara
38. Hyota Yamada
Malaysia

Head Coach: Sarjit Kundan

1. Syed Cholan
5. Mughni Kamal
6. Marhan Jalil (C)
7. Fitri Saari
8. Syarman Mat
10. Andywalfian Jeffrynus
11. Akhimullah Anuar
13. Alfarico Liau
15. Shello Silverius
16. Rafaizul Saini (GK)
17. Arif Ishak
18. Faiz Jali
21. Hafizuddin Othman (GK)
22. Norsyafiq Sumantri
23. Abu Kamal Azrai
24. Aiman Rozemi
26. Muhajir Abdu Rauf
27. Shafiq Hassan
29. Amirul Azahar
30. Faris Harizan
New Zealand

Head Coach: (South Africa) Greg Nicol

1. Dominic Dixon (GK)
2. Scott Boyde
5. Louis Beckert (GK)
8. Charlie Morrison
9. Sam Hiha
12. Sam Lane (C)
13. Simon Yorston
17. Nic Woods
18. Bradley Read
24. Sean Findlay
27. Scott Cosslett
29. Gus Nelson
30. Finn Ward
31. Hayden Phillips
32. George Baker
33. Jonty Elmes
34. Malachi Buschl
38. Benjamin Culhane
Pakistan

Head Coach: Tahir Zaman

1. Abdullah Ishtiaq Khan (GK)
2. Muhammad Abdullah
4. Muhib Ullah
5. Sufyan Khan
7. Moin Shakeel
8. Waheed Rana
9. Hannan Shahid
10. Zikriya Hayat
11. Arshad Liaqat
14. Ahmad Nadeem
15. Ghazanfar Ali
16. Ammad Butt (C)
17. Muhammad Hammadudin
18. Abdul Rehman
21. Afraz Hakeem
22. Waleed Rana
32. Abdul Mannan
56. Muneeb Ur-Rehman (GK)
77. Salman Razzaq
99. Junaid Manzoor
South Africa

Head Coach: Devon van der Merwe

1. Hendrik Kriek (GK)
3. Andrew Hobson
4. Calvin Davis
5. Senzwesihle Ngubane
6. Jacques van Tonder
7. Jaydon Brooker
8. Nduduzo Lembethe
10. Trevor de Lora
12. Marvin Simons
13. Angelo Walstoom
15. Carlon Mentoor
16. Matthew de Sousa
17. Jamie Seale
18. Reuben Sendzul
21. Zenani Kraai
22. Daniel Bell
29. Samkelo Mvimbi (C)
32. Gowan Jones (GK)
South Korea

Head Coach: Min Tae-seok

2. Jang Daehan (GK)
4. Kim Kyubeom
6. Yang Ji-hun
7. Park Cheoleon
8. Rim Jin-kang
9. Son Da-in
11. Lee Jung-jun (C)
13. Seo In-woo
14. Bae Jong-suk
15. Lim Do-hyun
19. Sim Jae-won
20. Baek Sung-hyun
23. Kim Hyeong-jin
24. Bae Soung Min
26. Kim Jae-han (GK)
27. Jin Geonhyo
32. Cheon Min-su
51. Lee Hye-seung
Wales

Head Coach: Daniel Newcomb

3. Daniel Kyriakides
5. Alf Dinnie
6. Jacob Draper
7. Gareth Griffiths
9. Rupert Shipperley (C)
13. Dale Hutchinson
14. Owen Sutton
15. Rhys Bradshaw
16. Sam Welsh
17. Fred Newbold
18. Gareth Furlong
20. Jolyon Morgan
23. Jack Pritchard
24. Hywel Jones
25. Benjamin Francis (C)
33. Rhys Payne (GK)
50. Toby Reynolds-Cotterill (GK)
61. John Bennett

== Preliminary round ==
All times are (UTC+8).

=== Pool A ===
Pos	Team	Pld	W	D	L	GF	GA	GD	Pts	Qualification
1	France	3	2	1	0	12	10	+2	7	Semi-finals
2	South Korea	3	2	0	1	9	8	+1	6	Semi-finals
3	Wales	3	0	2	1	8	9	−1	2	
4	South Africa	3	0	1	2	7	9	−2	1	

Source: FIH
Rules for classification: 1) points; 2) matches won; 3) goal difference; 4) goals for; 5) head-to-head result; 6) field goals scored.

15 June 2025
14:00

France	6–5	South Korea
Esmenjaud 9', 47', 58'; Charlet 56', 59'; Haertelmeyer 60'	Report	Lee J. 3'; Yang 21', 44'; Lim D. 25'; Park C. 36'

Umpires:
Ilanggo Kanabathu (MAS)
Peter Kabaso (KEN)

15 June 2025
16:00

South Africa	4–4	Wales
De Lora 35'; Walstroom 37'; Mvimbi 50'; Davis 59'	Report	Pritchard 5', 24', 26'; Morgan 22'

Umpires:
Ben Grant (NZL)
Nick Saunders (NZL)

16 June 2025
14:00

South Korea	3–2	Wales
Yang 44'; Lee J. 45'; Lim D. 57'	Report	Furlong 30'; Bradshaw 59'

Umpires:
Liu Xiaoying (CHN)
Ridge Bair (USA)

16 June 2025
16:00

South Africa	3–4	France
Brooker 2', 59'; Simons 59'	Report	Charlet 1', 35', 44'; Esmenjaud 58'

Umpires:
Timothy Sheahan (AUS)
Nick Saunders (NZL)

18 June 2025
14:00

South Korea	1–0	South Africa
Lim D. 29'	Report

Umpires:
Zeke Newman (AUS)
Ben Grant (NZL)

18 June 2025
16:00

France	2–2	Wales
Haertelmeyer 14'; Bellenger 54'	Report	Newbold 22'; Pritchard 45'

Umpires:
Lim Hong-Zhen (SGP)
Ilanggo Kanabathu (MAS)

=== Pool B ===
Pos	Team	Pld	W	D	L	GF	GA	GD	Pts	Qualification
1	New Zealand	3	3	0	0	10	7	+3	9	Semi-finals
2	Pakistan	3	1	1	1	9	9	0	4	Semi-finals
3	Malaysia (H)	3	1	1	1	8	8	0	4	
4	Japan	3	0	0	3	4	7	−3	0	

Source: FIH
Rules for classification: 1) points; 2) matches won; 3) goal difference; 4) goals for; 5) head-to-head result; 6) field goals scored.
(H) Hosts

15 June 2025
18:00

New Zealand	2–1	Japan
Hiha 6'; Thomas 56'	Report	Shinohara 5'

Umpires:
Timothy Sheahan (AUS)
Ridge Bair (USA)

15 June 2025
20:00

Malaysia	3–3	Pakistan
Fitri 49'; Cholan 52', 56'	Report	Nadeem 6'; Rehman 9'; Rana 54'

Umpires:
Zeke Newman (AUS)
Wanri Venter (RSA)

16 June 2025
18:00

Japan	2–3	Pakistan
Matsumoto 9'; Yamasaki 11'	Report	Ali 8'; Rana 34'; Khan 52'

Umpires:
Ben Grant (NZL)
Ilanggo Kanabathu (MAS)

16 June 2025
20:00

Malaysia	3–4	New Zealand
Akhimullah 18'; Fitri 38'; Azrai 39'	Report	F. Ward 44', 52'; Yorston 45'; Findlay 46'

Umpires:
Lim Hong-Zhen (SGP)
Peter Kabaso (KEN)

18 June 2025
18:00

New Zealand	4–3	Pakistan
Woods 7'; Cosslett 43', 45', 52'	Report	Rehman 13', 14'; Rana 28'

Umpires:
Wanri Venter (RSA)
Peter Kabaso (KEN)

18 June 2025
20:00

Japan	1–2	Malaysia
Yamasaki 56'	Report	Sumantri 5'; Azrai 26'

Umpires:
Liu Xiaoying (CHN)
Timothy Sheahan (AUS)

== Classification round ==
=== Bracket ===
Crossovers
20 June
Wales	6
Japan	4
20 June
Malaysia	4
South Africa	2

Fifth place
21 June
Wales	2
Malaysia	1
Seventh place
21 June
Japan	2
South Africa	1

=== Crossovers ===
20 June 2025
13:30

Wales	6–4	Japan
Newbold 9'; Morgan 21', 34', 45'; Welsh 34'; Furlong 59'	Report	Ooka 20'; Yamasaki 30'; Matsumoto 32'; Kawabe 60'

Umpires:
Wanri Venter (RSA)
Nick Saunders (NZL)

20 June 2025
16:00

Malaysia	4–2	South Africa
Cholan 15'; Hassan 37'; Akhimullah 40'; Fitri 53'	Report	Walstroom 30'; Mentoor 51'

Umpires:
Zeke Newman (AUS)
Lim Hong-Zhen (SGP)

=== Seventh and eighth place ===
21 June 2025
13:30

Japan	2–1	South Africa
Shinohara 35'; Kawabe 42'	Report	Davis 7'

Umpires:
Hong-Zhen Lim (SGP)
Liu Xiaoying (CHN)

=== Fifth and sixth place ===
21 June 2025
16:00

Wales	2–1	Malaysia
Bradshaw 42'; Furlong 50'	Report	Cholan 20'

Umpires:
Ridge Bair (USA)
Timothy Sheahan (AUS)

== Medal round ==
=== Bracket ===
Semi-finals
20 June
France	3 (2)
Pakistan (p.s.o.)	3 (3)
20 June
New Zealand (p.s.o.)	2 (4)
South Korea	2 (3)

Final
21 June
Pakistan	2
New Zealand	6
Third place
21 June
France (p.s.o.)	3 (3)
South Korea	3 (2)

=== Semi-finals ===
20 June 2025
18:30

France	3–3	Pakistan
Esmenjaud 25'; Charlet 34', 58'	Report	Afraz 38'; Khan 42'; Hammadudin 43'
Penalties
Montecot (penalty shoot-out scored); Lockwood (penalty shoot-out missed); Tynevez (penalty shoot-out missed); Sellier (penalty shoot-out scored); Esmenjaud (penalty shoot-out missed)	2–3	(penalty shoot-out scored) Afraz; (penalty shoot-out missed) Rehman; (penalty shoot-out scored) Shahid; (penalty shoot-out scored) Rana

Umpires:
Ben Grant (NZL)
Timothy Sheahan (AUS)

20 June 2025
21:00

New Zealand	2–2	South Korea
Elmes 10'; Thomas 19'	Report	Lim D. 25'; Yang 37'
Penalties
Boyde (penalty shoot-out missed); Findlay (penalty shoot-out scored); Phillips (penalty shoot-out scored); Yorston (penalty shoot-out scored); Woods (penalty shoot-out scored)	4–3	(penalty shoot-out missed) Bae; (penalty shoot-out missed) Lee H. (penalty shoot-out scored) Cheon; (penalty shoot-out scored) Lee J. (penalty shoot-out scored) Bae

Umpires:
Peter Kabaso (KEN)
Liu Xiaoying (CHN)

=== Third and fourth place ===
21 June 2025
18:30

France	3–3	South Korea
Marqué 15'; Esmenjaud 26'; Sellier 50'	Report	Yang 18', 49'; Lim D. 45'
Penalties
Montecot (penalty shoot-out scored); Jouin (penalty shoot-out scored); Lockwood (penalty shoot-out missed); Sellier (penalty shoot-out missed); Charlet (penalty shoot-out scored)	3–2	(penalty shoot-out missed) Kim; (penalty shoot-out missed) Cheon; (penalty shoot-out scored) Bae; (penalty shoot-out scored) Yang; (penalty shoot-out missed) Jin

Umpires:
Ilanggo Kanabathu (MAS)
Nick Saunders (NZL)

=== Final ===
21 June 2025
21:00

Pakistan	2–6	New Zealand
Hayat 36'; Khan 59'	Report	Cosslett 6', 58'; Hiha 15'; Thomas 17'; Findlay 18'; Boyde 27'

Umpires:
Wanri Venter (RSA)
Zeke Newman (AUS)

== Statistics ==
=== Final standings ===
Pos	Team	Promotion or relegation
1	New Zealand	
2	Pakistan	Promoted to the 2025–26 Men's FIH Pro League
3	France	
4	South Korea	
5	Wales	
6	Malaysia (H)	
7	Japan	
8	South Africa	Relegated to 2025–26 FIH Nations Cup 2

Source: FIH
(H) Host

=== Awards ===
The awards were announced on 21 June 2025.

Award	Player
Player of the tournament	(New Zealand) Nic Woods
Goalkeeper of the tournament	(New Zealand) Dominic Dixon
Best junior player	(Pakistan) Sufyan Khan

=== Goalscorers ===
There were 113 goals scored in 20 matches, for an average of 5.65 goals per match.

7 goals

- (France) Victor Charlet

6 goals

- (France) Xavier Esmenjaud
- (South Korea) Yang Ji-hun

5 goals

- (New Zealand) Scott Cosslett
- (South Korea) Lim Do-hyun

4 goals

- (Malaysia) Syed Cholan
- (Wales) Jolyon Morgan
- (Wales) Jack Pritchard

3 goals

- (Japan) Koji Yamasaki
- (Malaysia) Fitri Saari
- (New Zealand) Dylan Thomas
- (Pakistan) Sufyan Khan
- (Pakistan) Waheed Rana
- (Pakistan) Abdul Rehman
- (Wales) Gareth Furlong

2 goals

- (France) Louis Haertelmeyer
- (Japan) Kosei Kawabe
- (Japan) Kazumasa Matsumoto
- (Japan) Ryosuke Shinohara
- (Malaysia) Akhimullah Anuar
- (Malaysia) Abu Kamal Azrai
- (New Zealand) Sean Findlay
- (New Zealand) Sam Hiha
- (New Zealand) Finn Ward
- (South Africa) Jaydon Brooker
- (South Africa) Calvin Davis
- (South Africa) Angelo Walstroom
- (South Korea) Lee Jung-jun
- (Wales) Rhys Bradshaw
- (Wales) Fred Newbold

1 goal

- (France) Amaury Bellenger
- (France) Benjamin Marqué
- (France) Corentin Sellier
- (Japan) Ryoma Ooka
- (Malaysia) Shafiq Hassan
- (Malaysia) Norsyafiq Sumantri
- (New Zealand) Scott Boyde
- (New Zealand) Jonty Elmes
- (New Zealand) Nic Woods
- (New Zealand) Simon Yorston
- (Pakistan) Ghazanfar Ali
- (Pakistan) Afraz Hakeem
- (Pakistan) Muhammad Hammadudin
- (Pakistan) Zikriya Hayat
- (Pakistan) Ahmad Nadeem
- (South Africa) Trevor de Lora
- (South Africa) Carlon Mentoor
- (South Africa) Samkelo Mvimbi
- (South Africa) Marvin Simons
- (South Korea) Park Cheoleon
- (Wales) Sam Welsh

Source: FIH

== See also ==
- 2024–25 Women's FIH Hockey Nations Cup
- 2024–25 Men's FIH Pro League
- 2024–25 Men's FIH Hockey Nations Cup 2
