= 2015 Men's Hockey Under-21 Invitational Tournament =

2015 Men's Hockey Under–21 Invitational Tournament
Tournament details
- Host country: Netherlands
- City: Breda
- Dates: 18–25 July
- Teams: 6
- Venue: BH & BC Breda

Final positions
- Champions: Belgium
- Runner-up: Germany
- Third place: England

Tournament statistics
- Matches played: 18
- Goals scored: 71 (3.94 per match)
- Top scorer: (England) Luke Taylor (6 goals)

The 2015 Men's Hockey Under–21 Invitational Tournament was an invitational women's under–21 field hockey competition, hosted by Hockey Netherlands. The tournament took place between 18 and 25 July 2015 in Breda, Netherlands. A total of six teams competed for the title. It was held alongside a women's tournament.

Belgium won the tournament, defeating Germany 2–1 in the final. England defeated India 3–0 in the third place match.

== Teams ==
Including the Netherlands, 5 teams were invited by Hockey Netherlands to participate in the tournament. The team from England however, comprised players up to 23 years of age.

- Belgium
- England
- Germany
- India
- Netherlands (host nation)
- New Zealand

== Officials ==
The following umpires were appointed by the International Hockey Federation to officiate the tournament:

- Fraser Bell (SCO)
- Jens Brieschke (GER)
- Michael Dutrieux (BEL)
- Sherif El-Amari (EGY)
- Deepak Joshi (IND)
- Jasper Nagtzaam (NED)
- Bevan Nichol (NZL)
- Paul Walker (ENG)

== Results ==
=== Preliminary round ===
Pos	Team	Pld	W	D	L	GF	GA	GD	Pts	Qualification
1	Belgium	5	3	1	1	13	11	+2	10	Advanced to Final
2	Germany	5	3	0	2	13	11	+2	9	Advanced to Final
3	India	5	2	1	2	9	6	+3	7	
4	England	5	1	3	1	11	8	+3	6	
5	Netherlands (H)	5	1	3	1	6	8	−2	6	
6	New Zealand	5	0	2	3	7	15	−8	2	

Source: FIH
Rules for classification: 1) points; 2) goal difference; 3) games won; 4) head-to-head result.
(H) Hosts

==== Fixtures ====
18 July 2015
15:00

Germany	0–3	India
	Report	Armaan 29'; Harjeet 46'; Harmanpreet 52'

Umpires:
Sherif El-Amari (EGY)
Jasper Nagtzaam (NED)

18 July 2015
15:15

Belgium	0–4	England
	Report	Taylor 37', 65', 70'; Albery 45'

Umpires:
Bevan Nichol (NZL)
Fraser Bell (SCO)

18 July 2015
17:00

Netherlands	0–0	New Zealand
	Report

Umpires:
Michael Dutrieux (BEL)
Deepak Joshi (IND)

19 July 2015
15:00

Belgium	3–3	Netherlands
Kina 18'; Van Lierde 59'; Daelemans 62'	Report	Luijkx 5'; Pieters 28'; Schoenaker 34'

Umpires:
Paul Walker (ENG)
Sherif El-Amari (EGY)

19 July 2015
17:15

New Zealand	0–3	India
	Report	Harmanpreet 6', 41'; Simranjeet 29'

Umpires:
Fraser Bell (SCO)
Jens Brieschke (GER)

19 July 2015
19:00

England	2–3	Germany
Taylor 10'; Calnan 21'	Report	Grünenwald 31'; Nguyen 34'; Godau 37'

Umpires:
Deepak Joshi (IND)
Bevan Nichol (NZL)

21 July 2015
13:00

Germany	5–3	New Zealand
Willemsen 8'; Böckel 14'; Weinke 15'; Proske 39', 40'	Report	Lane 47'; Brydon 59'; Read 65'

Umpires:
Jasper Nagtzaam (NED)
Michael Dutrieux (BEL)

21 July 2015
15:00

Netherlands	1–1	England
Van Groesen 15'	Report	Taylor 3'

Umpires:
Jens Brieschke (GER)
Deepak Joshi (IND)

21 July 2015
17:00

Belgium	3–1	India
Degroote 42'; Zimmer 55'; Deruyttere 62'	Report	Harmanpreet 48'

Umpires:
Fraser Bell (SCO)
Paul Walker (ENG)

22 July 2015
11:00

England	3–3	New Zealand
Goodfield 10'; Clee 46'; Horler 50'	Report	Read 5'; Lane 27'; Thomas 55'

Umpires:
Sherif El-Amari (EGY)
Jens Brieschke (GER)

22 July 2015
13:00

India	1–2	Netherlands
Armaan 59'	Report	Van Groesen 18', 57'

Umpires:
Paul Walker (ENG)
Michael Dutrieux (BEL)

22 July 2015
15:00

Germany	2–3	Belgium
Willemsen 52'; Grambusch 65'	Report	Kina 10', 55'; Degroote 60'

Umpires:
Bevan Nichol (NZL)
Jasper Nagtzaam (NED)

24 July 2015
15:00

New Zealand	1–4	Belgium
Lane 42'	Report	Van Linthoudt 8'; Daelemans 19', 62'; Van Lierde 68'

Umpires:
Jasper Nagtzaam (NED)
Deepak Joshi (IND)

24 July 2015
17:00

India	1–1	England
Nilakanta 11'	Report	Taylor 11'

Umpires:
Jens Brieschke (GER)
Fraser Bell (SCO)

24 July 2015
19:00

Netherlands	0–3	Germany
	Report	Grambusch 8'; Schmid 9'; Hüttermann 52'

Umpires:
Paul Walker (ENG)
Sherif El-Amari (EGY)

=== Classification matches ===
==== Fifth and sixth place ====
25 July 2015
13:00

Netherlands	4–2	New Zealand
Burkhardt 16', 51'; Pieters 33'; Warmerdam 66'	Report	Wilcox 29', 58'

Umpires:
Deepak Joshi (IND)
Paul Walker (ENG)

==== Third and fourth place ====
25 July 2015
15:15

India	0–3	England
	Report	Horler 7', 47'; Hatherley 68'

Umpires:
Michael Detrieux (BEL)
Bevan Nichol (NZL)

==== Final ====
25 July 2015
17:30

Belgium	2–1	Germany
Cuvelier 33'; Zimmer 49'	Report	Willemsen 14'

Umpires:
Sherif El-Amari (EGY)
Fraser Bell (SCO)

== Statistics ==
=== Final standings ===
Pos	Team	Pld	W	D	L	GF	GA	GD	Pts	Result
1st place, gold medalist(s)	Belgium	6	4	1	1	15	12	+3	13	Tournament Champion
2nd place, silver medalist(s)	Germany	6	3	0	3	14	13	+1	9	
3rd place, bronze medalist(s)	England	6	2	3	1	14	8	+6	9	
4	India	6	2	1	3	9	9	0	7	
5	Netherlands (H)	6	2	3	1	10	10	0	9	
6	New Zealand	6	0	2	4	9	19	−10	2	

Source: FIH
(H) Hosts

=== Goalscorers ===
There were 71 goals scored in 18 matches, for an average of 3.94 goals per match.

6 goals

- (England) Luke Taylor

4 goals

- (India) Harmanpreet Singh

3 goals

- (Belgium) Alexander Daelemans
- (Belgium) Antoine Kina
- (England) Edward Horler
- (Germany) Leon Willemsen
- (Netherlands) Bram van Groesen
- (New Zealand) Samuel Lane

2 goals

- (Belgium) Tom Degroote
- (Belgium) Quentin van Lierde
- (Belgium) Tanguy Zimmer
- (Germany) Tom Grambusch
- (Germany) Nicolas Proske
- (India) Armaan Qureshi
- (Netherlands) Boris Burkhardt
- (Netherlands) Terrance Pieters
- (New Zealand) Bradley Read
- (New Zealand) Mackenzie Wilcox

1 goal

- (Belgium) Dimitri Cuvelier
- (Belgium) Xavier Deruyttere
- (Belgium) Alexandre van Linthoudt
- (England) James Albery
- (England) William Calnan
- (England) Jonathan Clee
- (England) David Goodfield
- (England) Samuel Hatherley
- (Germany) Anton Böckel
- (Germany) Nils Grünenwald
- (Germany) Maximilan Godau
- (Germany) Henning Hüttermann
- (Germany) Tino Nguyen
- (Germany) Philip Schmid
- (Germany) Ferdinand Weinke
- (India) Nilakanta Sharma
- (India) Harjeet Singh
- (India) Simranjeet Singh
- (Netherlands) Jasper Luijkx
- (Netherlands) Noud Schoenaker
- (Netherlands) Dennis Warmerdam
- (New Zealand) David Brydon
- (New Zealand) Dylan Thomas
