= 2022 Men's Trans-Tasman Hockey Series =

International field hockey competition

2022 Men's Trans–Tasman Hockey Series
Tournament details
- City: Auckland, New Zealand
- Dates: 31 May–5 June
- Teams: 2 (from 1 confederation)
- Venue: National Hockey Centre

Final positions
- Champions: Australia
- Runner-up: New Zealand

Tournament statistics
- Matches played: 4
- Goals scored: 22 (5.5 per match)
- Top scorer(s): (Australia) Nathan Ephraums (Australia) Blake Govers (5 goals)

The 2022 Trans–Tasman Hockey Series was a men's field hockey series, comprising four test matches between the national teams of Australia and New Zealand. The series was held at the National Hockey Centre in Auckland, from 31 May to 5 June.

Due to the ongoing impacts of the COVID-19 pandemic, the series was the first time the New Zealand side competed in an international match since July 2021 at the Olympic Games. The series was scheduled to be held alongside the women's event, however it was postponed due to COVID related issues.

== Squads ==
Australia

Head coach: Colin Batch

1. Lachlan Sharp
2. Thomas Craig
3. Corey Weyer
4. Jake Harvie
5. Thomas Wickham
6. Matthew Dawson
7. Nathan Ephraums
8. Johan Durst (GK)
9. Jacob Anderson
10. Joshua Beltz
11. Edward Ockenden (C)
12. Jacob Whetton
13. Blake Govers
14. Dylan Martin
15. Joshua Simmonds
16. Timothy Howard
17. Aran Zalewski (C)
18. Benjamin Rennie (GK)
19. Craig Marais
20. Ky Willott
21. Jack Welch
22. Flynn Ogilvie
23. Daniel Beale
26. James Collins
29. Timothy Brand
30. Andrew Charter (GK)
32. Jeremy Hayward
New Zealand

Head coach: (South Africa) Gregory Nicol

1. Dominic Dixon (GK)
2. Oliver MacIntyre
3. David Brydon
4. Dane Lett
5. Harry Miskimmin
9. Samuel Hiha
10. Kim Kingstone
11. Jacob Smith (C)
12. Samuel Lane
13. Simon Yorston
15. George Enersen (GK)
16. Aidan Sarikaya
18. Bradley Read
19. Joseph Morrison
20. Leon Hayward (GK)
23. Dylan Thomas
24. Sean Findlay
25. Jordan Cohen
26. Connor Greentree
31. Hayden Phillips
35. Charl Ulrich
36. Timothy Nield

== Results ==
All times are local (NZST).

=== Standings ===
Pos	Team	Pld	W	D	L	GF	GA	GD	Pts
1	Australia	4	4	0	0	19	3	+16	12
2	New Zealand (H)	4	0	0	4	3	19	−16	0

Source: FIH
Rules for classification: 1) points; 2) goal difference; 3) games won; 4) head-to-head result.
(H) Hosts

=== Fixtures ===
31 May 2022
19:05

New Zealand	1–8	Australia
Brydon 18'	Report	Ephraums 20', 28', 44'; Ogilvie 22'; Govers 31', 45'; Wickham 39'; Anderson 52'

Umpires:
Gareth Greenfield (NZL)
Zeke Newman (AUS)

2 June 2022
19:05

New Zealand	0–4	Australia
	Report	Hayward 4', 31'; Ephraums 11'; Govers 42'

Umpires:
Timothy Bond (NZL)
Gareth Greenfield (NZL)

4 June 2022
13:35

New Zealand	1–4	Australia
Lane 33'	Report	Govers 22'; Willott 30', 37'; Ephraums 56'

Umpires:
Zeke Newman (AUS)
Timothy Bond (NZL)

5 June 2022
13:35

New Zealand	1–3	Australia
Phillips 25'	Report	Govers 11'; Wickham 18'; Hayward 19'

Umpires:
Gareth Greenfield (NZL)
Zeke Newman (AUS)

== Goalscorers ==
There were 22 goals scored in 4 matches, for an average of 5.5 goals per match.

5 goals

- (Australia) Nathan Ephraums
- (Australia) Blake Govers

3 goals

- (Australia) Jeremy Hayward

2 goals

- (Australia) Thomas Wickham
- (Australia) Ky Willott

1 goal

- (Australia) Jacob Anderson
- (Australia) Flynn Ogilvie
- (New Zealand) David Brydon
- (New Zealand) Samuel Lane
- (New Zealand) Hayden Phillips

Source: FIH
