= Tevin Kok =

South African field hockey player

Personal information
- Full name: Tevin Michael Kok
- Born: 20 October 1996 (age 29) Kokstad, South Africa

Sport
- Sport: Field hockey
- Position: Forward
- Club: Pembroke Wanderers
National team
Years	Team	Caps	Goals
2014	South Africa u18 Hockey5s	10	(6)
2016	South Africa u21	18	(4)
2016–present	South Africa	74	(15)
Medal record
Men's field hockey
Representing South Africa
Junior African Cup
Silver medal – second place	2016 Windhoek
- Updated on 6 November 2025

Tevin Michael Kok (born 20 October 1996) is a South African field hockey player who plays as a forward. He competed in the 2020 Summer Olympics.

== Career ==
=== Under–18 ===
Kok made hem debut for the South Africa U–18 in 2014 at the Youth Olympic Games in Nanjing.

=== Under–21 ===
Kok made hem debut for the South Africa U–21 in 2016 at the Junior Africa Cup and Junior World Cup.

=== National team ===
Kok was a part of the South African squad which the 2016 Hartleyvale Summer Series, which he debut against Ireland.
