= 2016 Men's Ford National Hockey League =

Tournament details
- Host country: New Zealand
- Dates: 27 August – 17 September
- Teams: 8
- Venue(s): 7 (in 6 host cities)

Final positions
- Champions: –– Midlands (2nd title)
- Runner-up: –– Canterbury
- Third place: –– Central

Tournament statistics
- Matches played: 24
- Goals scored: 134 (5.58 per match)
- Top scorer(s): –– Martin Atkinson (10 goals)
- Best player: –– David Brydon

The 2016 Men's Ford National Hockey League was the 18th edition of the men's field hockey tournament. The competition was held in various cities across New Zealand, from 27 August to 17 September.

Midlands won the title for the second time, defeating Canterbury 3–1 in the final. Central finished in third place defeating North Harbour 3–2 in penalties following a 3–3 draw.

== Participating teams ==
The following eight teams competed for the title:

- –– Auckland
- –– Canterbury
- –– Capital
- –– Central
- –– Midlands
- –– Northland
- –– North Harbour

== Results ==
All times are local (NZST).

=== Preliminary round ===
Pos	Team	Pld	W	WD	LD	L	GF	GA	GD	Pts	Qualification
1	–– Canterbury	6	4	0	0	2	20	8	+12	16	Advanced to Final
2	–– Midlands	6	4	0	0	2	18	16	+2	16	Advanced to Final
3	–– North Harbour	6	3	2	0	1	20	8	+12	16	Advanced to Third Place Match
4	–– Central	6	3	1	1	1	23	10	+13	15	Advanced to Third Place Match
5	–– Capital	6	3	0	1	2	22	11	+11	13	
6	–– Auckland	6	1	0	1	4	8	17	−9	5	
7	–– Northland	6	0	0	0	6	3	44	−41	0	

Source: Hockey New Zealand
Rules for classification: 1) points; 2) matches won; 3) goal difference; 4) goals for; 5) head-to-head result; 6) field goals scored.

==== Fixtures ====
27 August 2016
15:00

Auckland ––	1–1	–– North Harbour
Poole 46'	Report	Reckers 2'
Penalties
Jujhar (penalty shoot-out scored); Kingstone (penalty shoot-out scored); Keaney (penalty shoot-out missed); O'Connor (penalty shoot-out scored); Panchia (penalty shoot-out missed)	3–4	(penalty shoot-out missed) Reckers; (penalty shoot-out scored) Bennett; (penalty shoot-out scored) Muir; (penalty shoot-out scored) Capizzi; (penalty shoot-out scored) Elder

Lloyd Elsmore Hockey Stadium, Auckland
Umpires:
Benjamin Wilson (NZL)
Bevan Nichol (NZL)

3 September 2016
14:00

Canterbury ––	3–1	–– Capital
Lane 5'; Bain 33'; Brydon 51'	Report	Lett 36'

Marist Hockey Club, Christchurch
Umpires:
Gareth Greenfield (NZL)
Mark Rippin (NZL)

3 September 2016
15:00

Central ––	4–1	–– Midlands
Stewart 16'; Atkinson 33', 55', 56'	Report	Ross 48'

Park Island Hockey Stadium, Napier
Umpires:
David Tomlinson (NZL)
Lee Erskine (NZL)

4 September 2016
14:00

North Harbour ––	7–0	–– Northland
Bennett 4', 11'; Capizzi 8', 31', 44'; Coughlan 44'; Reckers 46'	Report

North Harbour Hockey Stadium, Auckland
Umpires:
Andrew Spence (NZL)
Simon Taylor (NZL)

4 September 2016
14:00

Capital ––	2–2	–– Central
Roper 51'; Jenness 60'	Report	Thomas 35'; Atkinson 59'
Penalties
Jenness (penalty shoot-out scored); Logan (penalty shoot-out missed); Roper (penalty shoot-out scored); Lett (penalty shoot-out missed); Van Woerkom (penalty shoot-out missed)	2–3	(penalty shoot-out missed) Wilcox; (penalty shoot-out scored) Phillips; (penalty shoot-out scored) Thomas; (penalty shoot-out missed) Smith; (penalty shoot-out scored) Atkinson

National Hockey Stadium, Wellington
Umpires:
David Tomlinson (NZL)
Benjamin Grant (NZL)

4 September 2016
15:00

Midlands ––	3–2	–– Auckland
Stolk 12'; Lyons 20'; Mitai-Wells 45'	Report	Jimmieson 4'; Panchia 42'

Hickling Park, Taupō
Umpires:
Bevan Nichol (NZL)
Benjamin Wilson (NZL)

10 September 2016
13:30

Midlands ––	1–6	–– North Harbour
Ross 36'	Report	Jones 4', 53'; Capizzi 22', 26', 39'; Bennett 32'

Northland Hockey Association, Whangārei
Umpires:
Gareth Greenfield (NZL)
David Tomlinson (NZL)

10 September 2016
15:30

Canterbury ––	3–1	–– Central
Mouldey 9'; Lane 57'; Bain 58'	Report	Thorn 58'

Northland Hockey Association, Whangārei
Umpires:
Simon Taylor (NZL)
Benjamin Wilson (NZL)

10 September 2016
17:30

Northland ––	0–2	–– Auckland
	Report	Borren 40'; Keaney 54'

Northland Hockey Association, Whangārei
Umpires:
Mark Rippin (NZL)
Andrew Spence (NZL)

11 September 2016
14:00

Central ––	3–3	–– North Harbour
Young 40'; Alexander-Parker 49'; Atkinson 60'	Report	Bennett 7', 49'; Capizzi 57'
Penalties
Young (penalty shoot-out scored); Wilcox (penalty shoot-out missed); Thomas (penalty shoot-out missed); Hanks (penalty shoot-out missed); Atkinson (penalty shoot-out missed)	1–2	(penalty shoot-out missed) Coughlan; (penalty shoot-out scored) Reckers; (penalty shoot-out missed) Bennett; (penalty shoot-out scored) Muir; (penalty shoot-out missed) Elder

Northland Hockey Association, Whangārei
Umpires:
Bevan Nichol (NZL)
Gareth Greenfield (NZL)

11 September 2016
16:00

Auckland ––	1–7	–– Capital
Bell-Kake 27'	Report	Lett 17', 29', 34'; Roper 30', 51', 57', 59'

Northland Hockey Association, Whangārei
Umpires:
Benjamin Grant (NZL)
Mark Rippin (NZL)

11 September 2016
18:00

Northland ––	0–8	–– Canterbury
	Report	Lane 18', 32', 33'; Haig 20'; Niles 31'; W. Hayde 34', 36'; C. Hayde 56'

Northland Hockey Association, Whangārei
Umpires:
Simon Taylor (NZL)
David Tomlinson (NZL)

13 September 2016
13:30

Central ––	10–0	–– Northland
Atkinson 2', 8', 35'; Alexander-Parker 12', 55'; Young 27', 49'; Thomas 36', 39'; Phillips 52'	Report

Northland Hockey Association, Whangārei
Umpires:
Benjamin Grant (NZL)
Bevan Nichol (NZL)

13 September 2016
15:30

North Harbour ––	2–1	–– Canterbury
Bennett 43'; Capizzi 59'	Report	Lane 28'

Northland Hockey Association, Whangārei
Umpires:
Andrew Spence (NZL)
Benjamin Wilson (NZL)

13 September 2016
17:30

Capital ––	1–2	–– Midlands
Jenness 15'	Report	Mitai-Wells 4'; Woods 9'

Northland Hockey Association, Whangārei
Umpires:
David Tomlinson (NZL)
Gareth Greenfield (NZL)

14 September 2016
14:00

North Harbour ––	1–2	–– Capital
Capizzi 47'	Report	Van Woerkom 35'; Yeo 50'

Northland Hockey Association, Whangārei
Umpires:
Gareth Greenfield (NZL)
Mark Rippin (NZL)

14 September 2016
16:00

Canterbury ––	3–1	–– Auckland
Davidson 15'; Bain 40'; Haig 59'	Report	Bilkey 59'

Northland Hockey Association, Whangārei
Umpires:
Simon Taylor (NZL)
Andrew Spence (NZL)

14 September 2016
18:00

Northland ––	1–8	–– Midlands
McKechnie 22'	Report	Sarikaya 4', 60'; Mitai-Wells 17', 27'; Woods 23'; Stolk 30'; Ho-García 47'; Lyons 55'

Northland Hockey Association, Whangārei
Umpires:
Benjamin Wilson (NZL)
Benjamin Grant (NZL)

16 September 2016
12:30

Midlands ––	3–2	–– Canterbury
Stolk 3', 47'; Lyons 41'	Report	Newman 44'; Haig 47'

Northland Hockey Association, Whangārei
Umpires:
David Tomlinson (NZL)
Simon Taylor (NZL)

16 September 2016
14:00

Capital ––	9–2	–– Northland
Van Liemt 22'; Jenness 25'; Jones 35', 55'; MacIntyre 39'; Crossett 39'; Logan 40'; Van Woerkom 41'; Roper 46'	Report	Smith 48'; Cronin 58'

Northland Hockey Association, Whangārei
Umpires:
Benjamin Grant (NZL)
Benjamin Wilson (NZL)

16 September 2016
13:00

Auckland ––	1–3	–– Central
Panchia 52'	Report	Atkinson 6'; Young 15', 39'

Northland Hockey Association, Whangārei
Umpires:
Bevan Nichol (NZL)
Gareth Greenfield (NZL)

=== Classification round ===
==== Fifth and sixth place ====
17 September 2016
11:00

Capital ––	6–4	–– Auckland
Jenness 5', 33', 56'; Yeo 7'; Roper 21', 46'	Report	Crooks 37', 47'; O'Connor 44'; Keaney 53'

Northland Hockey Association, Whangārei
Umpires:
Andrew Spence (NZL)
Benjamin Wilson (NZL)

==== Third and fourth place ====
17 September 2016
11:15

North Harbour ––	3–3	–– Central
Reckers 5'; Bennett 47', 58'	Report	Atkinson 7'; Wilcox 39'; Stewart 45'
Penalties
Hanham (penalty shoot-out scored); Reckers (penalty shoot-out scored); Bennett (penalty shoot-out missed); Muir (penalty shoot-out missed); Elder (penalty shoot-out missed)	2–3	(penalty shoot-out scored) Young; (penalty shoot-out missed) Phillips; (penalty shoot-out scored) Creffier; (penalty shoot-out scored) Wilcox

Northland Hockey Association, Whangārei
Umpires:
Mark Rippin (NZL)
David Tomlinson (NZL)

==== Final ====
17 September 2016
15:00

Canterbury ––	1–3	–– Midlands
Haig 24'	Report	Lyons 9'; Herewini 44', 58'

Northland Hockey Association, Whangārei
Umpires:
Simon Taylor (NZL)
Gareth Greenfield (NZL)

== Statistics ==
=== Final standings ===
Pos	Team	Pld	W	WD	LD	L	GF	GA	GD	Pts	Qualification
1st place, gold medalist(s)	–– Midlands	7	5	0	0	2	21	17	+4	20	Gold Medal
2nd place, silver medalist(s)	–– Canterbury	7	4	0	0	3	21	11	+10	16	Silver Medal
3rd place, bronze medalist(s)	–– Central	7	3	2	1	1	26	13	+13	17	Bronze Medal
4	–– North Harbour	7	3	2	1	1	23	11	+12	17	
5	–– Capital	7	4	0	1	2	28	15	+13	17	
6	–– Auckland	7	1	0	1	5	12	23	−11	5	
7	–– Northland	6	0	0	0	6	3	44	−41	0	

Source: Hockey New Zealand

=== Goalscorers ===
There were 134 goals scored in 24 matches, for an average of 5.58 goals per match.

10 goals

- –– Martin Atkinson

9 goals

- –– Robert Capizzi

8 goals

- –– Phillip Roper
- –– Cory Bennett

6 goals

- –– Samuel Lane
- –– Stephen Jenness

5 goals

- –– Matthew Young

4 goals

- –– Nicholas Haig
- –– Dane Lett
- –– Joseph Lyons
- –– Leo Mitai-Wells
- –– Adriaan Stolk

3 goals

- –– Richard Bain
- –– Brennan Alexander-Parker
- –– Dylan Thomas
- –– Rob Reckers

2 goals

- –– Joseph Crooks
- –– Jonathan Keaney
- –– Daniel Panchia
- –– William Hayde
- –– Jared Jones
- –– Benedict van Woerkom
- –– Rowan Yeo
- –– Oscar Stewart
- –– Connor Herewini
- –– Nicholas Ross
- –– Aidan Sarikaya
- –– Zachary Woods
- –– Craig Jones

1 goal

- –– Mark Bell-Kake
- –– Jonathon Bilkey
- –– Guy Borren
- –– Samuel Jimmieson
- –– Kieran O'Connor
- –– Benjamin Poole
- –– David Brydon
- –– William Davidson
- –– Cameron Hayde
- –– Thomas Mouldey
- –– Dominic Newman
- –– Jason Niles
- –– Steven Crosset
- –– Oliver Logan
- –– Oliver MacIntyre
- –– Martin van Liemt
- –– Hayden Phillips
- –– Jonathan Thorn
- –– Mackenzie Wilcox
- –– Gabriel Ho-García
- –– Luther Cronin
- –– Hamish McKechnie
- –– Sanjay Smith
- –– James Coughlan

Source: Hockey New Zealand
