= 2024 Men's Hockey Junior Africa Cup =

International field hockey competition

2024 Men's Junior Africa Cup

Tournament details
- Host country: Windhoek
- City: Namibia
- Dates: 18–25 April 2025
- Teams: 6 (from 1 confederation)
- Venue: Windhoek High School

Final positions
- Champions: South Africa (6th title)
- Runner-up: Namibia
- Third place: Egypt

Tournament statistics
- Matches played: 17
- Goals scored: 95 (5.59 per match)
- Top scorer: (South Africa) Jaydon Brooker (16 goals)
- Best player: (South Africa) Jaydon Brooker
- Best goalkeeper: (South Africa) Dan Dillion
- Fair play award: Namibia

The 2024 Men's Hockey Junior Africa Cup was the 13th edition of the Men's Junior Africa Cup, the men's international under-21 field hockey championship of Africa, organized by the African Hockey Federation. It was held alongside the women's tournament at Windhoek High School in Windhoek, Namibia from 18 to 25 April 2025.

The defending champions South Africa won their sixth title after defeating the hosts Namibia 5–0 in the final. Egypt won the bronze medal after defeating Kenya 4–2 in a shoot-out after the match finished 2–2. The tournament served as a direct qualifier for the 2025 Junior World Cup, with the top three teams qualifying.

== Qualified teams ==
The following teams have qualified for the tournament. Ghana and Nigeria withdrew from the tournament due to financial challenges.

Egypt

Head coach: Ahmed Zakaria

1. Mohamed Geneidy (GK)
3. Omar Nasr
4. Mohamed Hosni
7. Ahmed Fahmy
8. Gamal Ali
9. Ahmed El-Hadi
10. Said Kamal (C)
11. Basel Abdelmonem
13. Mohamed Hassanein
14. Mohamed Ghanem
17. Bassem Mokhtar
21. Ahmed Soliman
22. Ahmed Fouda
27. Abdelrahman Kasem
29. Ebraheem Arafaat (GK)
~~Ghana~~
Kenya

Head coach: Griffin Amakulie

2. Hillary Kwalimwa
3. Alex Ondego
5. Samuel Mboche
6. Brian Indimuli
7. Vincent Wesonga
10. Gideon Mungai
12. Kit Garner
14. Victor Sam
17. Matthew Momanyi
18. Noel Lormotum
20. Paul Odero
22. Fredrick Ochieng
23. Isaac Wanjawa
25. Charles Ashihundu
41. Josephat Otieno (GK)
42. Mathias Omwaka (C)
84. Arnold Nyakango (GK)
Namibia

Head Coach: Johann Weyhe

1. Rylan Bombosch (GK)
2. Krynauw Weber
3. Giovane Handura
4. Sean Irwin
5. Anton Myburgh
6. Thomas Theron
7. Ludwig van Rooyen
8. John-Paul Britz (C)
9. Gerhard Myburgh
10. Christian du Raan
11. Zach Philander
12. Jack Fourie
13. Mathew Lassen
14. Darren Enslin
15. Owen Hatton
16. James de Jager
17. Abraham Graham
19. Lyle Bruys (GK)
~~Nigeria~~
South Africa

Head coach: Guy Elliott

3. Viwe Mbata
4. Thabang Jeyi
5. Jamie Seale
7. Jaydon Brooker
8. Daniel Neuhoff (C)
10. Carlon Mentoor
11. Brett Horn
13. Ross Montgomery
15. Damian Knott
16. Litha Kraai
18. Daniel Dillon (GK)
20. Sachin Padayachee
25. Matthew de Oliveira
27. Gianluca Virissimo (GK)
29. Ozair Pillai
44. Daniel den Bakker
Zambia

Head coach: Floyd Chomba

1. Robson Kunda (C, GK)
2. Jeremiah Mwansa
3. Manjanja Tembo
4. Richard Banda
5. Alex Mwansa
6. Amos Silavwe
7. Enock Kaluba
8. Ntanda Maimbo
9. Isaac Mutale
10. Christopher Steinemann
11. George Jere (C)
12. Abraham Tagwireyi
13. Nicholas Mwaba
14. Justin Mpande
15. Andrew Tembo
16. Jackson Chilata (GK)
17. David Kalunga
18. Oliver Gale (GK)
Zimbabwe

Head coach: Prince Mwale

1. Tochukwu Nnam (GK)
2. Dayle Nichole
3. Nathan Davies
4. Emmanuel Mushosho
5. Takunda Muchacha
6. Daniel Erasmus
7. Tadiwanashe Chigumira
8. Dhiren Ramabhai
9. Dhaneel Goven
10. Justin Steyn
11. Ngonidzashe Ndadzibaya
12. Joseph Ncube
13. Matipa Mawere
14. John-Mark Benadie
16. Takudzwa Makudo
17. Tinashe Munyenyiwa
18. Shawn Mugavha (GK)
28. Mutsawashe Kanyangarara (C)

== Preliminary round ==
All times are local (UTC+2).

=== Standings ===
Pos	Team	Pld	W	D	L	GF	GA	GD	Pts	Qualification
1	South Africa	5	5	0	0	34	5	+29	15	Final and 2025 Junior World Cup
2	Namibia (H)	5	4	0	1	20	14	+6	12	Final and 2025 Junior World Cup
3	Egypt	5	2	1	2	10	14	−4	7	Third place match
4	Kenya	5	1	2	2	11	16	−5	5	Third place match
5	Zimbabwe	5	1	1	3	4	12	−8	4	
6	Zambia	5	0	0	5	6	24	−18	0	

Source: FIH
Rules for classification: 1) points; 2) matches won; 3) goal difference; 4) goals for; 5) head-to-head result; 6) field goals for.
(H) Hosts

=== Matches ===
18 April 2025
13:00

Zimbabwe	0–0	Kenya
	Report

Umpires:
Peter Caulder (RSA)
Siyabonga Martins (NAM)

18 April 2025
17:00

Egypt	1–3	Namibia
Abdelmonem 36'	Report	Britz 53', 58'; Hatton 58'

Umpires:
Bryn Lowe (ZIM)
Munashe Mashoko (ZIM)

18 April 2025
19:00

South Africa	12–3	Zambia
Montgomery 5', 15', 55'; Mentoor 8', 27', 41', 57'; Seale 8'; Kraai 19', 57'; Mbata 37'; Brooker 48'	Report	Tagwireyi 13', 40'; Mpande 47'

Umpires:
Haitham Selim (EGY)
Siyabonga Martins (NAM)

19 April 2025
11:00

Zambia	1–2	Zimbabwe
Banda 26'	Report	Goven 32'; Benadie 60'

Umpires:
Siyabonga Martins (NAM)
Evason Liyayi (KEN)

19 April 2025
13:00

Egypt	4–4	Kenya
Kasem 12'; Hegab 35'; Abdelmonem 57'; Salem 59'	Report	Omwaka 7'; Ochieng 48'; Mungai 51'; Ashihundu 55'

Umpires:
Bryn Lowe (ZIM)
Peter Caulder (RSA)

19 April 2025
15:00

South Africa	8–0	Namibia
Horn 8'; Brooker 14', 24', 25', 26', 33', 35'; Kraai 49'	Report

Umpires:
Munashe Mashoko (ZIM)
Haitham Selim (EGY)

21 April 2025
11:00

Zambia	1–3	Egypt
A. Mwansa 57'	Report	Kasem 12', 51'; Hosni 44'

Umpires:
Bryn Lowe (ZIM)
Peter Caulder (RSA)

21 April 2025
13:00

Zimbabwe	1–7	South Africa
Mawere 59'	Report	Brooker 1', 16', 18', 40', 48'; Jeyi 52'; Kraai 58'

Umpires:
Siyabonga Martins (NAM)
Evason Liyayi (KEN)

21 April 2025
17:00

Kenya	3–5	Namibia
Lormotum 6'; Wesonga 29'; Mudher 46'	Report	Britz 7', 53'; De Jager 15'; Fourie 24'; Graham 45'

Umpires:
Munashe Mashoko (ZIM)
Haitham Selim (EGY)

22 April 2025
11:00

Egypt	0–5	South Africa
	Report	Kraai 6', 49'; Horn 10'; Brooker 24', 43'

Umpires:
Bryn Lowe (ZIM)
Siyabonga Martins (NAM)

22 April 2025
13:00

Kenya	2–1	Zambia
Ashihundu 31'; Omwaka 43'	Report	Tagwireyi 22'

Umpires:
Peter Caulder (RSA)
Munashe Mashoko (ZIM)

22 April 2025
17:00

Namibia	4–1	Zimbabwe
Hatton 2', 19', 32'; Handura 48'	Report	Mawere 18'

Umpires:
Evason Liyayi (KEN)
Haitham Selim (EGY)

24 April 2025
11:00

Zimbabwe	1–2	Egypt
M. Kanyangarara 24'	Report	Fouda 20'; Hosni 60+'

Umpires:
Peter Caulder (RSA)
Evason Liyayi (KEN)

24 April 2025
17:00

Namibia	8–1	Zambia
Hatton 9'; Van Rooyen 11'; Du Raan 25', 52'; Handura 38'; J. Britz 47'; Lassen 59'; Fourie 60'	Report	Mutale 16'

Umpires:
Bryn Lowe (ZIM)
Haitham Selim (EGY)

24 April 2025
19:00

South Africa	2–1	Kenya
Mentoor 12'; Montgomery 56'	Report	Bhamra 10'

Umpires:
Siyabonga Martins (Nam)
Munashe Mashoko (Zim)

== Classification round ==
=== Third and fourth place ===
25 April 2025
14:30

Egypt	2–2	Kenya
El-Hadi 23'; Hegab 51'	Report	Ashihundu 45', 52'
Penalties
Kamal (penalty shoot-out scored); Hassanein (penalty shoot-out scored); Hosni (penalty shoot-out scored); Mokhtar (penalty shoot-out scored)	4–2	(penalty shoot-out scored) Ashihundu; (penalty shoot-out scored) Omwaka; (penalty shoot-out missed) Momanyi; (penalty shoot-out missed) Indimuli

Umpires:
Bryn Lowe (ZIM)
Peter Caulder (RSA)

=== Final ===
25 April 2025
19:00

South Africa	5–0	Namibia
Sendzul 5'; Brooker 13', 24'; Montgomery 39'; Mbata 56'	Report

Umpires:
Haitham Selim (EGY)
Munashe Mashoko (ZIM)

== Statistics ==
=== Final standings ===
Pos	Team	Qualification
1st place, gold medalist(s)	South Africa	2025 Junior World Cup
2nd place, silver medalist(s)	Namibia (H)	2025 Junior World Cup
3rd place, bronze medalist(s)	Egypt	2025 Junior World Cup
4	Kenya	
5	Zimbabwe	
6	Zambia	

Source: FIH
(H) Host

=== Awards ===
The following awards were given at the conclusion of the tournament.

Top Goalscorer	Player of the Tournament	Goalkeeper of the Tournament
(South Africa) Jaydon Brooker	(South Africa) Jaydon Brooker	(South Africa) Dan Dillion

=== Goalscorers ===
There were 95 goals scored in 17 matches, for an average of 5.59 goals per match.

16 goals

- (South Africa) Jaydon Brooker

6 goals

- (South Africa) Litha Kraai

5 goals

- (Namibia) John-Paul Britz
- (Namibia) Owen Hatton
- (South Africa) Carlon Mentoor
- (South Africa) Ross Montgomery

4 goals

- (Kenya) Charles Ashihundu

3 goals

- (Egypt) Abdelrahman Kasem
- (Zambia) Abraham Tagwireyi

2 goals

- (Egypt) Basel Abdelmonem
- (Egypt) Mohab Hegab
- (Egypt) Mohamed Hosni
- (Kenya) Mathias Omwaka
- (Namibia) Christian du Raan
- (Namibia) Jack Fourie
- (Namibia) Giovane Handura
- (South Africa) Brett Horn
- (South Africa) Viwe Mbata
- (Zimbabwe) Matipa Mawere

1 goal

- (Egypt) Ahmed El-Hadi
- (Egypt) Ahmed Fouda
- (Egypt) Ziad Salem
- (Kenya) Tarankabir Bhamra
- (Kenya) Noel Lormotum
- (Kenya) Nirmaan Mudher
- (Kenya) Gideon Mungai
- (Kenya) Fredrick Ochieng
- (Kenya) Vincent Wesonga
- (Namibia) James de Jager
- (Namibia) Abraham Graham
- (Namibia) Mathew Lassen
- (Namibia) Ludwig van Rooyen
- (South Africa) Thabang Jeyi
- (South Africa) Jamie Seale
- (South Africa) Reuben Sendzul
- (Zambia) Richard Banda
- (Zambia) Justin Mpande
- (Zambia) Isaac Mutale
- (Zambia) Alex Mwansa
- (Zimbabwe) John-Mark Benadie
- (Zimbabwe) Dhaneel Goven
- (Zimbabwe) Mutsawashe Kanyangarara

Source: FIH

== See also ==
- 2024 Women's Hockey Junior Africa Cup
