= Nduduzo Lembethe =

South African field hockey player

Personal information
- Full name: Nduduzo Peabo Lembethe
- Born: 13 January 1996 (age 30) Pietermaritzburg, South Africa

Sport
- Sport: Field hockey
- Position: Midfielder
- Club: YMCA Hockey Club
Senior career
Years	Team	Caps	Goals
-2020	University of Pretoria	-	-
2020-present	YMCA Hockey Club	-	-
National team
Years	Team	Caps	Goals
2016	South Africa under-21	11	(0)
2018–present	South Africa	42	(0)
Medal record
Men's field hockey
Representing South Africa
Africa Cup of Nations
Gold medal – first place	2022 Accra
Gold medal – first place	2025 Ismailia
Junior Africa Cup
Silver medal – second place	2016 Windhoek
- Updated on 24 January 2022

Nduduzo Peabo Lembethe (born 13 January 1996) is a South African field hockey player. He competed in the 2020 Summer Olympics.
