= 2023 Men's Oceania Cup =

Field hockey tournament

Tournament details
- Host country: New Zealand
- City: Whangārei
- Dates: 10–13 August
- Teams: 2 (from 1 confederation)
- Venue: Northland Hockey Association

Final positions
- Champions: Australia (12th title)
- Runner-up: New Zealand

Tournament statistics
- Matches played: 3
- Goals scored: 14 (4.67 per match)
- Top scorer(s): (Australia) Jeremy Hayward (Australia) Jacob Whetton (New Zealand) Sam Lane (2 goals)

The 2023 Men's Oceania Cup was the twelfth edition of the Men's Oceania Cup after the cancellation of the 2022 edition due to the COVID-19 pandemic, the biennial international men's field hockey championship of Oceania organised by the Oceania Hockey Federation. It was held from 10 to 13 August 2023.

Australia were the defending champions, having won all previous editions. The event consisted of a three match series between defending champions Australia and series hosts, New Zealand. Australia, as the winner, qualified for the 2024 Summer Olympics.

== Squads ==
Australia

Head coach: Colin Batch

1. Thomas Craig
4. Jake Harvie
6. Matt Dawson
7. Nathan Ephraums
8. Johan Durst (GK)
10. Joshua Beltz
11. Eddie Ockenden (C)
12. Jacob Whetton
13. Blake Govers
15. Jayden Atkinson
16. Tim Howard
17. Aran Zalewski (C)
18. Benjamin Rennie (GK)
20. Ky Willott
21. Jack Welch
22. Flynn Ogilvie
23. Daniel Beale
32. Jeremy Hayward
New Zealand

Head coach: (South Africa) Gregory Nicol

2. Scott Boyde
4. Dane Lett
6. Simon Child
8. Charles Morrison
9. Sam Hiha
12. Sam Lane (C)
13. Simon Yorston
15. George Enersen (GK)
16. Aidan Sarikaya
17. Nic Woods (C)
20. Leon Hayward (GK)
21. Kane Russell
22. Blair Tarrant
24. Sean Findlay
29. Hugo Inglis
31. Hayden Phillips
32. George Baker
34. Malachi Buschl

== Officials ==
The following umpires were appointed by the FIH to officiate the tournament:

- Amber Church (NZL)
- Gareth Greenfield (NZL)
- Aleisha Neumann (AUS)
- Steve Rogers (AUS)
- David Tomlinson (NZL)

== Results ==
=== Standings ===
Pos	Team	Pld	W	D	L	GF	GA	GD	Pts	Qualification
1	Australia	3	2	0	1	8	6	+2	6	2024 Summer Olympics
2	New Zealand (H)	3	1	0	2	6	8	−2	3	2024 FIH Hockey Olympic Qualifiers

Source: FIH
Rules for classification: 1) points; 2) matches won; 3) goal difference; 4) goals for; 5) head-to-head result; 6) field goals for.
(H) Hosts

All times are local (UTC+12).

=== Fixtures ===
10 August 2023
19:05

New Zealand	1–3	Australia
Lane 14'	Report	Whetton 1'; Govers 8'; Craig 56'

Umpires:
Steve Rogers (AUS)
David Tomlinson (NZL)

12 August 2023
14:05

New Zealand	4–2	Australia
Lane 5'; Russell 7'; Woods 13'; Findlay 29'	Report	Whetton 19'; Hayward 34'

Umpires:
Gareth Greenfield (NZL)
Steve Rogers (AUS)

13 August 2023
14:05

New Zealand	1–3	Australia
Phillips 27'	Report	Willott 5'; Hayward 13'; Welch 55'

Umpires:
Steve Rogers (AUS)
David Tomlinson (NZL)

== Goalscorers ==
There were 14 goals scored in 3 matches, for an average of 4.67 goals per match.

2 goals

- (Australia) Jeremy Hayward
- (Australia) Jacob Whetton
- (New Zealand) Sam Lane

1 goal

- (Australia) Tom Craig
- (Australia) Blake Govers
- (Australia) Jack Welch
- (Australia) Ky Willott
- (New Zealand) Sean Findlay
- (New Zealand) Hayden Philips
- (New Zealand) Kane Russell
- (New Zealand) Nic Woods

Source: FIH

== See also ==
- 2023 Women's Oceania Cup
