= Joe Morrison (field hockey) =

New Zealand field hockey player

Personal information
- Full name: Joseph Grant Morrison
- Born: 4 October 2001 (age 24) Christchurch, New Zealand

Sport
- Sport: Field hockey
- Position: Midfield
Senior career
Years	Team	Caps	Goals
–	Canterbury	-	-
National team
Years	Team	Caps	Goals
2023–	New Zealand	19	(1)
Medal record
Men's field hockey
Representing New Zealand
Oceania Cup
Silver medal – second place	2025 Darwin	Team
FIH Olympic Qualifiers
Bronze medal – third place	2024 Muscat	Team

Joseph Grant Morrison (born 4 October 2001) is a field hockey player from New Zealand.

== Life ==
Morrison was born in Christchurch, New Zealand, on 4 October 2001. His younger brother, Charlie, is also a member of the Black Sticks squad.

== Field hockey ==
=== Domestic league ===
In the Ford National Hockey Championship, Morrison represents Canterbury.

=== Black Sticks ===
Morrison was first called into the Black Sticks squad in 2022. He made his debut that year during the Trans–Tasman Series in Auckland. He went on to make further appearances that year, during a test series against the Netherlands in Eindhoven, as well as season four of the FIH Pro League.

In 2023 he was a member of the squad at the FIH World Cup in Bhubaneswar and Rourkela.

He competed at the 2024 FIH Olympic Qualifiers in Muscat, winning a bronze medal.
