= 2023 Men's Hockey Junior Africa Cup =

International field hockey competition

2023 Men's Junior Africa Cup
Tournament details
- Host country: Egypt
- City: Ismailia
- Dates: 12–16 March
- Teams: 4 (from 1 confederation)
- Venue(s): Suez Canal Authority Stadium

Final positions
- Champions: South Africa (5th title)
- Runner-up: Egypt
- Third place: Kenya

Tournament statistics
- Matches played: 8
- Goals scored: 32 (4 per match)
- Top scorer(s): (South Africa) James Flint (5 goals)
- Best player: (Egypt) Hossameldin Ragab
- Best goalkeeper: (South Africa) Reece Govender

The 2023 Junior Africa Cup was an international field hockey competition held from 12 to 16 March 2023 in Ismailia, Egypt.

The tournament served as a direct qualifier for the 2023 Junior World Cup, with the winner and runner-up qualifying.

South Africa won their fifth title after defeating the defending champions and hosts Egypt in the final 4–3 in a shoot-out after the match finished 2–2 in regular time.

== Qualified teams ==
The following teams have qualified for the tournament.

- South Africa
- Egypt
- ~~Ghana~~
- ~~Nigeria~~
- Zimbabwe
- Kenya

== Preliminary round ==
=== Standings ===
Pos	Team	Pld	W	D	L	GF	GA	GD	Pts	Qualification
1	South Africa	3	3	0	0	15	1	+14	9	Final
2	Egypt (H)	3	2	0	1	4	4	0	6	Final
3	Kenya	3	1	0	2	4	8	−4	3	Third place match
4	Zimbabwe	3	0	0	3	2	12	−10	0	Third place match

Source: FIH
Rules for classification: 1) points; 2) goal difference; 3) goals scored; 4) head-to-head result.
(H) Hosts

=== Matches ===
12 March 2023
15:00

Egypt	1–0	Kenya
Adel 2'	Report

Umpires:
Jonathan von Hoesslin (RSA)
Munashe Mashoko (ZIM)

12 March 2023
17:00

South Africa	6–0	Zimbabwe
Maseko 17'; Davis 25'; Flint 31', 39', 48'; Mbata 41'	Report

Umpires:
Carren Koloni (KEN)
Hisham Moaaz (EGY)

13 March 2023
15:00

Egypt	0–3	South Africa
	Report	Mentoor 5'; Maseko 30'; Neethling 55'

Umpires:
Titus Ngolia (KEN)
Munashe Mashoko (ZIM)

13 March 2023
17:00

Zimbabwe	1–2	Kenya
Ncube 60'	Report	Omwaka 16'; Momanyi 32'; Wandera 59'

Umpires:
Haroon Rashid (PAK)
Hisham Moaaz (EGY)

15 March 2023
15:00

Zimbabwe	1–3	Egypt
Shumba 58'	Report	Mokhtar 6'; Adel 57'; Elhadi 59'

Umpires:
Titus Ngolia (KEN)
Jonathan von Hoesslin (RSA)

15 March 2023
17:00

South Africa	6–1	Kenya
Mbata 7'; Montgomery 14'; Flint 28'; Davis 45'; Ansell 47'; Neethling 47'	Report	Kimtai 11'

Umpires:
Munashe Mashoko (ZIM)
Haroon Rashid (PAK)

== Final round ==
=== Third place match ===
16 March 2023
12:30

Kenya	2–1	Zimbabwe
Momanyi 3'; Omwaka 26'	Report	Sibanda 22'

Umpires:
Haroon Rashid (PAK)
Hisham Moaaz (EGY)

=== Final ===
16 March 2023
16:30

South Africa	2–2	Egypt
Flint 12'; Ditlhakanyane 42'	Report	Ali 51'; Adel 55'
Penalties
Le Forestier (penalty shoot-out missed); Neethling (penalty shoot-out scored); Mthalane (penalty shoot-out missed); Kahder (penalty shoot-out scored); Knott (penalty shoot-out scored); Neethling (penalty shoot-out scored)	4–3	(penalty shoot-out missed) Adel; (penalty shoot-out missed) Bakr; (penalty shoot-out scored) Ragab; (penalty shoot-out scored) Ali; (penalty shoot-out scored) Mokhtar; (penalty shoot-out missed) Adel

Umpires:
Munashe Mashoko (ZIM)
Titus Ngolia (KEN)

== Awards ==
The following awards were given at the conclusion of the tournament.

Top Goalscorer	Player of the Tournament	Goalkeeper of the Tournament
(South Africa) James Flint	(Egypt) Hossameldin Ragab	(South Africa) Reece Govender

== Final standings ==
Pos	Team	Qualification
1	South Africa	2023 Junior World Cup
2	Egypt (H)	2023 Junior World Cup
3	Kenya	
4	Zimbabwe	

Source: FIH
(H) Host

== Goalscorers ==
There were 32 goals scored in 8 matches, for an average of 4 goals per match.

5 goals

- (South Africa) James Flint

3 goals

- (Egypt) Ziad Adel

2 goals

- (Kenya) Matthew Momanyi
- (Kenya) Mathias Omwaka
- (South Africa) Calvin Davis
- (South Africa) Tebogo Maseko
- (South Africa) Viwe Mbata
- (South Africa) Hans Neethling

1 goal

- (Egypt) Abdalla Ali
- (Egypt) Ahmed Elhadi
- (Egypt) Bassem Mokhtar
- (Kenya) Sheldon Kimtai
- (Kenya) Job Wandera
- (South Africa) Nathan Ansell
- (South Africa) Leruo Ditlhakanyane
- (South Africa) Carlon Mentoor
- (South Africa) Ross Montgomery
- (Zimbabwe) Joseph Ncube
- (Zimbabwe) Onward Shumba
- (Zimbabwe) Ray-Royce Sibanda

Source: FIH

== See also ==
- 2023 Women's Hockey Junior Africa Cup
