= 2015 Women's Hockey Under-21 Invitational Tournament =

2015 Women's Hockey Under–21 Invitational Tournament
Tournament details
- Host country: Netherlands
- City: Breda
- Dates: 19–26 July
- Teams: 6
- Venue: BH & BC Breda

Final positions
- Champions: Netherlands
- Runner-up: China
- Third place: India

Tournament statistics
- Matches played: 18
- Goals scored: 65 (3.61 per match)
- Top scorer: 8 Players (3 goals)

The 2015 Women's Hockey Under-21 Invitational Tournament was an invitational women's under-21 field hockey competition, hosted by Hockey Netherlands. The tournament took place between 19 and 25 July 2015 in Breda, Netherlands. A total of five teams competed for the title. It was held alongside a men's tournament.

The Netherlands won the tournament, defeating China 5–1 in the final. India defeated England 1–0 in penalties, after the third place match finished 1–1.

== Teams ==
Including the Netherlands, 5 teams were invited by Hockey Netherlands to participate in the tournament. The team from England however, comprised players up to 23 years of age.

- China
- England
- Germany
- India
- Netherlands (host nation)
- New Zealand

== Officials ==
The following umpires were appointed by the International Hockey Federation to officiate the tournament:

- Fanneke Alkemade (NED)
- Vilma Bagdanskiene (LTU)
- Durga Devi (IND)
- Maggie Giddens (USA)
- Emma Shelbourn (ENG)
- Sandra Wagner (GER)
- Katrina Woolf (NZL)
- Ju Xiaoyu (CHN)

== Results ==
=== Preliminary round ===
Pos	Team	Pld	W	D	L	GF	GA	GD	Pts	Qualification
1	China	5	5	0	0	14	4	+10	15	Advanced to Final
2	Netherlands (H)	5	3	1	1	9	3	+6	10	Advanced to Final
3	England	5	1	2	2	4	11	−7	5	
4	India	5	1	1	3	12	11	+1	4	
5	New Zealand	5	1	1	3	7	14	−7	4	
6	Germany	5	0	3	2	8	11	−3	3	

Source: FIH
Rules for classification: 1) points; 2) goal difference; 3) games won; 4) head-to-head result.
(H) Hosts

=== Fixtures ===
19 July 2015
13:00

Netherlands	1–0	India
Wijsman 33'	Report

Umpires:
Maggie Giddens (USA)
Sandra Wagner (GER)

19 July 2015
15:15

England	2–2	New Zealand
Martin 41'; Van Berkel 57'	Report	Robinson 15'; Smith 66'

Umpires:
Ju Xiaoyu (CHN)
Fanneke Alkemade (NED)

19 July 2015
17:00

Germany	1–3	China
Huse 59'	Report	Gu 7'; Zhong 38', 68'

Umpires:
Katrina Woolf (NZL)
Vilma Bagdanskiene (LTU)

21 July 2015
17:15

India	4–4	Germany
Renuka 14'; Anupa 17'; Jaspreet 41'; Lilima 56'	Report	Gräve 10'; Horn 10'; Schubert 54'; Winter 68'

Umpires:
Emma Shelbourn (ENG)
Katrina Woolf (NZL)

21 July 2015
19:00

China	3–1	New Zealand
Ou 22'; Cong 49'; Guo 52'	Report	Norman 57'

Umpires:
Fanneke Alkemade (NED)
Sandra Wagner (GER)

21 July 2015
19:15

Netherlands	5–0	England
Van Wijk 4'; Van der Plas 23'; Matla 32', 60', 65'	Report

Umpires:
Maggie Giddens (USA)
Durga Devi (IND)

22 July 2015
17:00

Germany	1–1	England
Gräve 2'	Report	Turner 65'

Umpires:
Vilma Bagdanskiene (LTU)
Ju Xiaoyu (CHN)

22 July 2015
17:15

New Zealand	1–2	Netherlands
Robinson 47'	Report	Veen 35'; Van Ramshorst 54'

Umpires:
Emma Shelbourn (ENG)
Durga Devi (IND)

22 July 2015
19:00

India	2–4	China
Punam 9'; Anupa 66'	Report	Yuan 16', 70'; Zhong 20'; Ou 51'

Umpires:
Katrina Woolf (NZL)
Fanneke Alkemade (NED)

24 July 2015
13:15

England	0–3	China
	Report	Guo 16'; Cong 23'; Gu 54'

Umpires:
Durga Devi (IND)
Sandra Wagner (GER)

24 July 2015
15:15

New Zealand	1–6	India
Norman 53'	Report	Rani 5', 30', 40'; Navneet 9'; Anupa 46'; Mayengbam 70+'

Umpires:
Maggie Giddens (USA)
Fanneke Alkemade (NED)

24 July 2015
17:15

Netherlands	1–1	Germany
De Lange 58'	Report	Hessler 28'

Umpires:
Ju Xiaoyu (CHN)
Emma Shelbourn (ENG)

25 July 2015
13:15

England	1–0	India
Holmes 47'	Report

Umpires:
Ju Xiaoyu (CHN)
Sandra Wagner (GER)

25 July 2015
15:30

China	1–0	Netherlands
Cong 68'	Report

Umpires:
Maggie Giddens (USA)
Katrina Woolf (NZL)

25 July 2015
17:45

Germany	1–2	New Zealand
Winter 50'	Report	Smith 54'; Tinning 69'

Umpires:
Emma Shelbourn (ENG)
Vilma Bagdanskiene (LTU)

=== Classification round ===
==== Fifth and sixth place ====
26 July 2015
11:15

New Zealand	2–1	Germany
Winterbottom 20'; Norman 68'	Report	Winter 14'

Umpires:
Vilma Bagdanskiene (LTU)
Durga Devi (IND)

==== Third and fourth place ====
26 July 2015
13:00

England	1–1	India
Martin 68'	Report	Punam 31'
Penalties
Petty (penalty shoot-out missed); Holmes (penalty shoot-out missed); Rayer (penalty shoot-out missed); Martin (penalty shoot-out missed); Crowson (penalty shoot-out missed)	0–1	(penalty shoot-out missed) Anupa; (penalty shoot-out scored) Grace; (penalty shoot-out missed) Lilima; (penalty shoot-out missed) Rani; (penalty shoot-out missed) Navneet

Umpires:
Katrina Woolf (NZL)
Fanneke Alkemade (NED)

==== Final ====
26 July 2015
13:30

China	1–5	Netherlands
Gu 5'	Report	Leurink 16'; Adegeest 35'; Van Ramshorst 37'; Stam 53'; Van Wijk 67'

Umpires:
Maggie Giddens (USA)
Sandra Wagner (GER)

== Statistics ==
=== Final standings ===
Pos	Team	Pld	W	D	L	GF	GA	GD	Pts	Result
1st place, gold medalist(s)	Netherlands (H)	6	4	1	1	14	4	+10	13	Tournament Champion
2nd place, silver medalist(s)	China	6	5	0	1	15	9	+6	15	
3rd place, bronze medalist(s)	India	6	1	2	3	13	12	+1	5	
4	England	6	1	3	2	5	12	−7	6	
5	New Zealand	6	2	1	3	9	15	−6	7	
6	Germany	6	0	3	3	9	13	−4	3	

Source: FIH
(H) Hosts

=== Goalscorers ===
There were 65 goals scored in 18 matches, for an average of 3.61 goals per match.

3 goals

- (China) Gu Bingfeng
- (China) Zhong Mengling
- (China) Cong Zengyu
- (Germany) Anne Winter
- (India) Anupa Barla
- (India) Rani Rampal
- (Netherlands) Frédérique Matla
- (New Zealand) Pippa Norman

2 goals

- (China) Yuan Meng
- (China) Guo Qiu
- (China) Ou Zixia
- (England) Hannah Martin
- (Germany) Elisa Gräve
- (India) Punam Barla
- (Netherlands) Theresa van Ramshorst
- (Netherlands) Kiki van Wijk
- (New Zealand) Amy Robinson
- (New Zealand) Kelsey Smith

1 goal

- (England) Rebecca van Berkel
- (England) Katherine Holmes
- (England) Hayley Turner
- (Germany) Emma Hessler
- (Germany) Kira Horn
- (Germany) Viktoria Huse
- (Germany) Tessa-Margot Schubert
- (India) Jaspreet Kaur
- (India) Navneet Kaur
- (India) Lily Mayengbam
- (India) Lilima Minz
- (India) Renuka Yadav
- (Netherlands) Charlotte Adegeest
- (Netherlands) Lisanne de Lange
- (Netherlands) Laurien Leurink
- (Netherlands) Pleun van der Plas
- (Netherlands) Lauren Stam
- (Netherlands) Marijn Veen
- (Netherlands) Carmen Wijsman
- (New Zealand) Catherine Tinning
- (New Zealand) Courtney Winterbottom
