= Finn Ward =

New Zealand field hockey player

Personal information
- Full name: Finn Mcleod Ward
- Born: 21 September 2000 (age 25) Dunedin, New Zealand

Sport
- Sport: Field hockey
- Position: Midfield
Senior career
Years	Team	Caps	Goals
–	Southern Alpiners	-	-
National team
Years	Team	Caps	Goals
2019–2021	New Zealand U–21	6	(0)
2025–	New Zealand	5	(1)
Medal record
Men's field hockey
Representing New Zealand
Oceania Cup
Silver medal – second place	2025 Darwin
FIH Nations Cup
Gold medal – first place	2024–25 Kuala Lumpur

Finn Mcleod Ward (born 21 September 2000) is a field hockey player from New Zealand.

== Life ==
Finn Ward grew up in Dunedin, New Zealand. His brothers, Jordan and Patrick also play field hockey.

He is a former student of King's High School.

== Career ==
=== Domestic league ===
Ward plays domestically in his home country of New Zealand. In the Premier Hockey League he represents the Southern Alpiners. He also plays in the Ford National Hockey Championship, where he represents his home region of Otago.

=== Under–21 ===
Ward made his international debut at under–21 level. He represented the New Zealand U–21 team at the 2019 Sultan of Johor Cup in Johor Bahru.

=== Black Sticks ===
After four years out of the national set-up, Ward received his first call-up to the Black Sticks in 2025. He made his senior international debut during the FIH Nations Cup in Kuala Lumpur. At the tournament, he won a gold medal and scored his first international goal. He has since been named in the squad for the 2025 Oceania Cup in Darwin.
