= 2012 Men's Junior Africa Cup for Nations =

Junior hockey competition

2012 Men's Hockey Junior Africa Cup for Nations
Tournament details
- Host country: South Africa
- City: Johannesburg
- Dates: 13–20 October
- Teams: 5 (from 1 confederation)
- Venue: Randburg Hockey Stadium

Final positions
- Champions: South Africa (4th title)
- Runner-up: Egypt
- Third place: Ghana

The 2012 Junior Africa Cup for Nations for Nations was the 10 edition of the Men's Africa Cup for Nations, was an international field hockey competition held from 13 to 20 October 2012 in Randburg Hockey Stadium, Johannesburg, South Africa.

The tournament served as a direct qualifier for the 2013 Junior World Cup, with the winner and runner-up qualifying.

== Qualified teams ==
- Egypt
- Ghana
- Kenya
- South Africa
- Zimbabwe

== Results ==
=== Pool Stage ===
| Pos | Team | Pld | W | D | L | GF | GA | GD | Pts | Qualification |
|---|---|---|---|---|---|---|---|---|---|---|
| 1 | South Africa (H) | 4 | 4 | 0 | 0 | 22 | 0 | +22 | 12 | Medal Round |
| 2 | Egypt | 4 | 3 | 0 | 1 | 29 | 3 | +26 | 9 | Medal Round |
| 3 | Ghana | 4 | 2 | 0 | 2 | 16 | 12 | +4 | 6 | Medal Round |
| 4 | Kenya | 4 | 1 | 0 | 3 | 5 | 19 | −14 | 3 | Medal Round |
| 5 | Zimbabwe | 4 | 0 | 0 | 4 | 1 | 19 | −18 | 0 | |

Source: Men Junior Field Hockey 10th Africa Cup 2012 Randburg (RSA)
Rules for classification: 1) points; 2) goal difference; 3) goals scored; 4) head-to-head result.
(H) Hosts

==== Matches ====
13 October 2012
10:00

| Ghana | 6–0 | Kenya |

Randburg Hockey Stadium

13 October 2012
16:00

| Egypt | 14–1 | Zimbabwe |

Randburg Hockey Stadium

14 October 2012
12:00

| Egypt | 9–0 | Kenya |

Randburg Hockey Stadium

14 October 2012
16:00

| South Africa | 11–0 | Zimbabwe |

Randburg Hockey Stadium

16 October 2012
12:00

| Kenya | 5–0 | Zimbabwe |

Randburg Hockey Stadium

16 October 2012
16:00

| South Africa | 6–0 | Ghana |

Randburg Hockey Stadium

17 October 2012
12:00

| Ghana | 5–0 | Kenya |

Randburg Hockey Stadium

17 October 2012
16:00

| South Africa | 1–0 | Egypt |

Randburg Hockey Stadium

19 October 2012
14:00

| Egypt | 6–5 | Ghana |

Randburg Hockey Stadium

19 October 2012
16:00

| South Africa | 4–0 | Kenya |

Randburg Hockey Stadium

=== Classification Stage ===
==== Third and fourth place ====
20 October 2012
11:30

| Ghana | 4–2 | Kenya |

Randburg Hockey Stadium

==== Final ====
20 October 2012
16:30

| South Africa | 1–1 | Egypt |
Penalties
| | 4–2 |

Randburg Hockey Stadium

== Statistics ==
=== Final standings ===
| Pos | Team | Qualification |
|---|---|---|
| 1st place, gold medalist(s) | South Africa (H) | 2013 Junior World Cup |
| 2nd place, silver medalist(s) | Egypt | 2013 Junior World Cup |
| 3rd place, bronze medalist(s) | Ghana | |
| 4 | Kenya | |
| 5 | Zimbabwe | |

Source: Men Junior Field Hockey 10th Africa Cup 2012 Randburg (RSA)
(H) Host

== See also ==
- 2012 Women's Junior Africa cup for Nations

== See also ==
- FIH 2016 Junior African Cup
