= Malachi Buschl =

New Zealand field hockey player

Personal information
- Born: 15 October 1999 (age 26) Tauranga, New Zealand
- Height: 174 cm (5 ft 9 in)

Sport
- Sport: Field hockey
- Position: Defence
Senior career
Years	Team	Caps	Goals
2020–	Southern Alpiners	-	-
National team
Years	Team	Caps	Goals
2018–	New Zealand	50	(0)
2018–2019	New Zealand U–21	12	(0)
Medal record
Men's field hockey
Representing New Zealand
Oceania Cup
Silver medal – second place	2023 Whangārei
Silver medal – second place	2025 Darwin
FIH Nations Cup
Gold medal – first place	2023–24 Gniezno
Gold medal – first place	2024–25 Kuala Lumpur
Sultan Azlan Shah Cup
Bronze medal – third place	2024 Ipoh

Malachi Buschl (born 15 October 1999) is a field hockey player from New Zealand.

== Life ==
Malachi Buschl was born in Tauranga, and grew up in Dunedin, New Zealand.

He is a former student of King's High School.

== Career ==
=== Domestic league ===
Buschl plays domestically in his home country of New Zealand. In the Premier Hockey League he represents the Southern Alpiners. He also plays in the Ford National Hockey Championship, where he represents his home region of Otago.

=== Under–21 ===
He represented the New Zealand U–21 team at the 2018 and 2019 editions of the Sultan of Johor Cup in Johor Bahru.

=== Black Sticks ===
Buschl made his senior international debut for the Black Sticks in 2018. He earned his first senior cap during a test match against India in Bengaluru. He also made more appearances later that year during a test series against Canada in Auckland.

He did not represent the national team again until 2023, when he returned to the side for the 2022–23 FIH Pro League. Since his return, Buschl has been a regular member in the national squad, going on to win numerous medals with the national team. He won silver at the 2023 Oceania Cup in Whangārei, bronze at the 2024 Sultan of Johor Cup in Ipoh, and gold at the 2023–24 and 2024–25 editions of the FIH Nations Cup in Gniezno and Kuala Lumpur, respectively.

In 2024 he became an Olympian, representing Team New Zealand at the XXXIII Olympic Games in Paris.

He has most recently been named in the squad for the 2025 Oceania Cup in Darwin.
