= Nic Woods =

New Zealand field hockey player

Personal information
- Full name: Nicholas James Woods
- Born: 26 August 1995 (age 31) Hamilton, New Zealand
- Height: 1.80 m (5 ft 11 in)
- Weight: 90 kg (198 lb)

Sport
- Sport: Field hockey
- Position: Midfielder
- Club: Hamburger Polo Club
Senior career
Years	Team	Caps	Goals
2014–2015	Midlands	-	-
2016–2018	Daring	-	-
2018–2020	Racing Bruxelles	-	-
2020–present	Hamburger Polo Club	-	-
National team
Years	Team	Caps	Goals
2013–2016	New Zealand U21	41	-
2014–present	New Zealand	131	(21)
Medal record
Men's field hockey
Commonwealth Games
Silver medal – second place	2018 Gold Coast	Team
Oceania Cup
Silver medal – second place	2015 Stratford
Silver medal – second place	2019 Rockhampton
Silver medal – second place	2023 Whangārei

Nicholas James Woods (born 26 August 1995) is a New Zealand field hockey player who plays as a midfielder for German club Hamburger Polo Club and the New Zealand national team.

He represented his country at the 2016 Summer Olympics in Rio de Janeiro, where the men's team came seventh.

== Club career ==
Woods played for the Midlands in the New Zealand National Hockey League. He joined Royal Daring in the Belgian Hockey League in 2016. After two seasons he left Daring for Racing Club de Bruxelles. Before the 2020–21 season his contract was not extended and he left Belgium for the Hambuger Polo Club in Germany.
