= 2016 Men's Hockey Junior Africa Cup =

Junior hockey competition

2016 Men's Junior Africa Cup
Tournament details
- Host country: Namibia
- City: Windhoek
- Dates: 18–28 March
- Teams: 5 (from 1 confederation)
- Venue: Windhoek High School

Final positions
- Champions: Egypt (4th title)
- Runner-up: South Africa
- Third place: Zimbabwe

Tournament statistics
- Top scorer(s): (Egypt) Ahmed El-Ganaini (South Africa) Nqobile Ntuli (14 goals)

The 2016 Junior Africa Cup for Nations was an international field hockey competition held from 18 to 28 March 2016 in Windhoek, Namibia.

The tournament served as a direct qualifier for the 2016 Junior World Cup, with the winner and runner-up qualifying.

== Qualified teams ==
- Namibia
- South Africa
- Tanzania
- Zimbabwe
- Egypt

== Results ==
=== Pool Stage ===
Pos	Team	Pld	W	D	L	GF	GA	GD	Pts	Qualification
1	South Africa	4	4	0	0	47	0	+47	12	Semi-finals
2	Egypt	4	3	0	1	44	3	+41	9	Semi-finals
3	Namibia (H)	4	1	0	3	41	22	+19	3	Semi-finals
4	Zimbabwe	4	2	0	2	13	21	−8	6	Semi-finals
5	Tanzania	4	0	0	4	1	100	−99	0	

Source: FIH
Rules for classification: 1) points; 2) goal difference; 3) goals scored; 4) head-to-head result.
(H) Hosts

==== Matches ====
18 Mar 2016
15:30

Zimbabwe	10-1	Tanzania
Ashley 3', 19', 50'; Makuvise 13'; Muzamwese 30'; Machaya 30'; Motsi 41'; Ncube 50'; Mufandaeza 65'; Chomunorwa 68'	Report	Gohil 66'

18 Mar 2016
17:30

Egypt	8-0	Namibia
Gadelkarim 21'; Ali 30'; Kasem 31', 57'; Adel 39'; Ragab 47'; Elganaini 48', 51'	Report

20 Mar 2016
15:00

Egypt	28-0	Tanzania
Adel 1', 21', 27', 39', 49', 51', 54', 59'; Elganaini 5', 18', 23', 37', 40', 57', 60'; Salah 10', 24'; Basha 20', 28'; Gadelkarim 23', 41'; Nasr 30', 62', 68'; Zaki 32'; Ali 44', 45'; Arafa 65'	Report

20 Mar 2016
17:00

South Africa	12-0	Namibia
Kok 17', 51'; Crowe 19', 54'; Lion-Cachet 31', 32'; Stewart 39'; Letuka 43'; Bowren 45'; Ntuli 50', 69'; Halle 53'	Report

21 Mar 2016
18:00

Zimbabwe	0-11	South Africa
	Report	Mokale 10'; Lion-Cachet 12', 67'; Halle 21'; Bowren 27'; Ntuli 35', 42', 57'; Letuka 45'; Crowe 47'; Julius 58'

20 Mar 2016
19:00

Tanzania	0-23	Namibia
	Report	Finch 2', 6', 7', 35', 42', 43', 44'; Jeffery 11', 16', 25', 34', 38', 53', 57', 57', 59', 67'; Grobbelaar 26', 0'; Jacobs 27', 50' le Roux 30'; Calitz 66'

23 Mar 2016
15:00

Egypt	0-2	South Africa
	Report	Pfaff 47'; Lion-Cachet 56'

23 Mar 2016
17:00

Namibia	1-2	Zimbabwe
Jeffery 43'	Report	Ashley 6'; Chomunorwa 67'

24 Mar 2016
17:00

South Africa	22-0	Tanzania
Halle 2'; Ntuli 2', 5', 18', 34', 38'; Julius 8', 16'; Lion-Cachet 10', 56' de Sousa 14', 40'; Letuka 19', 42', 67'; Mokale 25', 26'; Crowe 30', 52', 56'; Lembethe 62'; Bowren 66'	Report

24 Mar 2016
17:00

Zimbabwe	1-8	Egypt
Motsi 60'	Report	Adel 13', 20'; Gadelkarim 31', 48'; Elganaini 37'; Ali 44'; Arafa 47'; Nasr 69'

== First to fourth place classification ==
25 Mar 2016
17:00

Namibia	17-0	Tanzania
Calitz 11', 25', 62'; Karigub 16'; Jacobs 17', 35', 68', 68' le Roux 18', 40'; Strydom 27', 29', 54', 60'; Grobbelaar 36', 45'; Jacobs 51'	Report

=== Classification Stage ===
Semi-finals
26 March
South Africa	11
Namibia	1
26 March
Egypt	12
Zimbabwe	2

Final
28 March
South Africa	2
Egypt	3
Third place
27 March
Namibia	3
Zimbabwe	5

==== Semi-finals ====
27 March 2016
13:00

South Africa	11–1	Namibia
Lion-Cachet 16', 50', 54'; Hallen 21', 25'; Julius 32'; Ntuli 38', 40'; Letuka 42'; Dlungwana 59'; Crowe 64'	Report	Finch 61'

Umpires:
Bryn Lowe(ZIM)
Michiel Otten(NED)

27 March 2016
15:30

Egypt	12–2	Zimbabwe
Elganaini 17', 25', 35', 39'; Arafa 17', 39', 40', 69'; Basha 36'; Gadelkarim 53', 59'; Ghonein 60'	Report	Mufandaeza 10'; Machaya 66'

Umpires:
Siyabonga Martins(NAM)
Bruce Bale(ENG)

==== Third and fourth place ====
28 March 2016
11:30

Namibia	3–5	Zimbabwe
Adkins 24', 60'; Jeffery 29'	Report	Makuvise 20'; Ashley 23'; Machaya 46', 49'; Motsi 58'

Umpires:
Bryn Lowe(ZIM)
Jonathan von Hoesslin(RSA)

==== Final ====
29 March 2016
14:00

South Africa	2–3	Egypt
Ntuli 32', 39'	Report	Ali 14'; Arafa 22'; Nash 55'

Umpires:
Siyabonga Martins(NAM)
Bruce Bale(ENG)

== Statistics ==
=== Final standings ===
Rank	Team
1st place, gold medalist(s)	Egypt
2nd place, silver medalist(s)	South Africa
3rd place, bronze medalist(s)	Zimbabwe
4	Namibia
5	Tanzania

=== Goalscorers ===
There have been 185 goals scored in 15 matches, for an average of 12.3 goals per match.

14 goals

- (Egypt) Ahmed Elganaini
- (South Africa) Nqobile Ntuli

12 goals

- (Namibia) Wayne Jeffery

11 goals

- (Egypt) Mohamed Adel

10 goals

- (South Africa) Kyle Lion-Cachet

8 goals

- (Namibia) Dylan Finch

7 goals

- (Egypt) Ahmed Arafa
- (Egypt) Mohamed Gadelkarim
- (South Africa) Ryan Crowe

6 goals

- (Namibia) Pieter Jacobs
- (South Africa) Amkelwe Letuka

5 goals

- (Egypt) Mohamed Ali
- (Egypt) Mohamed Nasr
- (South Africa) Courtney Halle
- (Zimbabwe) Dominic Ashley

4 goals

- (Namibia) Schalk Grobbelaar
- (Namibia) Wiehan Strydom
- (South Africa) Ryan Julius
- (Zimbabwe) Phillip Machaya

3 goals

- (Egypt) Ahmed Basha
- (Namibia) Riaan Calitz
- (Namibia) Pieter Le Roux
- (South Africa) Charlie Bowren
- (South Africa) Khumo Mokale
- (Zimbabwe) Forbes Motsi

2 goals

- (Egypt) Abdelrahman Kasem
- (Egypt) Ibrahim Salah
- (Namibia) Tyler Adkins
- (South Africa) Matthew De Sousa
- (South Africa) Tevin Kok
- (Zimbabwe) Gift Chomunorwa
- (Zimbabwe) Alexander Makuvise
- (Zimbabwe) Eau Mufandaeza

1 goal

- (Egypt) Mohamed Ghoneim
- (Egypt) Mostafa Ragab
- (Egypt) Mahmoud Zaki
- (Namibia) Stephan Calitz
- (Namibia) Nicolaas Jacobs
- (Namibia) Baggio Karigub
- (South Africa) Tyson Dlungwana
- (South Africa) Nduduzo Lembethe
- (South Africa) Walter Pfaff
- (South Africa) Alex Stewart
- (Tanzania) Mihir Gohil
- (Zimbabwe) Tinotendaishe Muzamwese
- (Zimbabwe) Batsirai Ncube

Source: FIH

== See also ==
- 2016 Women's Junior Africa cup for Nations

== See also ==
- FIH 2016 Junior African Cup
