= Charlie Morrison (field hockey) =

New Zealand field hockey player

Personal information
- Full name: Charlie Ryan Morrison
- Born: 20 July 2003 (age 23) Christchurch, New Zealand

Sport
- Sport: Field hockey
- Position: Defence
Senior career
Years	Team	Caps	Goals
–	Canterbury	-	-
National team
Years	Team	Caps	Goals
2022–	New Zealand U–21	3	(0)
2023–	New Zealand	23	(0)
Medal record
Men's field hockey
Representing New Zealand
Oceania Cup
Silver medal – second place	2023 Whangārei
Silver medal – second place	2025 Darwin

Charlie Ryan Morrison (born 20 July 2003) is a field hockey player from New Zealand.

== Life ==
Morrison was born in Christchurch, New Zealand, on 20 July 2003. His older brother, Joseph, is also a member of the Black Sticks squad.

He currently studies at Lincoln University.

== Field hockey ==
=== Domestic league ===
In the Ford National Hockey Championship, Morrison represents Canterbury.

=== Under–21 ===
Morrison made his debut for the New Zealand U–21 team in 2022 during the Junior Oceania Cup in Canberra.

In 2023 he was named to the junior squad again.

=== Senior national team ===
Following a successful junior debut, Morrison made his first senior appearance in 2023. He made his debut at the FIH World Cup in Bhubaneswar and Rourkela. Throughout the year he continued to represent the national side, making appearances in season four of the FIH Pro League and the Oceania Cup in Whangārei, winning silver at the latter.

He competed at the 2024 FIH Olympic Qualifiers in Muscat. At the tournament he was named as the best junior player.
