= Mackenzie Wilcox =

New Zealand field hockey player

Personal information
- Full name: Mackenzie Brian Wilcox
- Born: 7 August 1996 (age 29) Tolaga Bay, New Zealand

Sport
- Sport: Field hockey
- Position: Forward
Senior career
| Years | Team | Caps | Goals |
| 2015–2019 | Central | 36 | 2 |
| 2020–2024 | Central Falcons | 7 | 1 |
National team
| Years | Team | Caps | Goals |
| 2016 | New Zealand U–21 | 14 | (4) |
| 2017–2019 | New Zealand | 28 | (3) |
Medal record
Men's field hockey
Representing New Zealand
Oceania Cup
| Silver medal – second place | 2017 Sydney | Team |

Mackenzie 'Mac' Brian Wilcox (born 7 August 1996) is a field hockey player from New Zealand, who plays as a forward.

== Personal life ==
Mackenzie Wilcox was born and raised in Tolaga Bay, New Zealand.

== Career ==
=== Domestic competitions ===
==== Ford NHL ====
Mackenzie Wilcox was a member of the Central Mavericks in the Ford National Hockey League (NHL), representing the team from 2015 to 2019. During his time with the team, Wilcox won a bronze medal in the 2016 edition of the tournament.

==== Premier Hockey League ====
Following the overhaul of the NHL and subsequent introduction of the Premier Hockey League, Wilcox was named in the Central Falcons. The league's inaugural edition was held in 2020, with the team taking home a gold medal. Wilcox was also a part of the 2024 squad that won the silver medal.

=== National teams ===
==== Under–21 ====
Wilcox debuted for the New Zealand U–21 team in 2016 at the Junior Oceania Cup. Following this, he appeared at the Sultan of Johor Cup in Johor Bahru, followed by the FIH Junior World Cup in Lucknow.

==== Black Sticks ====
In 2017, Wilcox debuted for the Black Sticks during a test series against Pakistan in Wellington. Following his debut, he went on to win a silver medal at the Oceania Cup in Sydney.

Following a major hip surgery, Wilcox was forced to miss a year of hockey during his recovery.

Wilcox was also a member of the Black Sticks in the inaugural season of the FIH Pro League.

=== International goals ===
| Goal | Date | Location | Opponent | Score | Result | Competition | Ref. |
|---|---|---|---|---|---|---|---|
| 1 | 18 March 2017 | National Hockey Stadium, Wellington, New Zealand | Pakistan | 2–0 | 2–2 | Test Match | |
| 2 | 14 October 2017 | Sydney Olympic Park, Sydney, Australia | Papua New Guinea | 7–0 | 19–0 | 2017 Oceania Cup | |
| 3 | 25 April 2019 | North Harbour Hockey Stadium, Auckland, New Zealand | Australia | 3–4 | 3–4 | 2019 FIH Pro League | |
