= Calvin Davis (field hockey) =

South African field hockey player

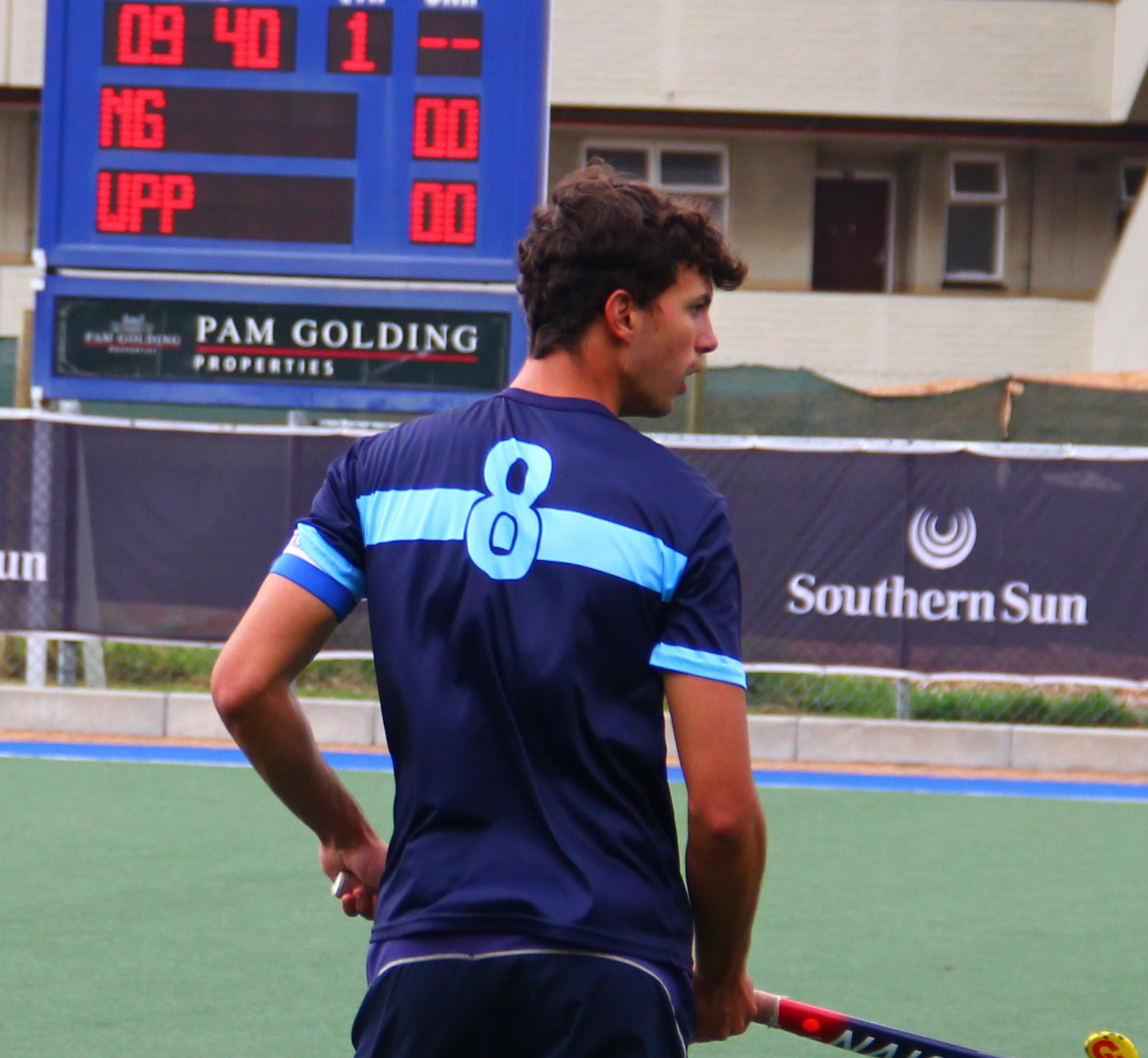
- 2024 U21 IPT men's Northern Blues v WP Peninsula

Personal information
- Born: 22 November 2003 (age 22)

Sport
- Sport: Field hockey
- Club: Tuks
National team
| Years | Team | Caps | Goals |
| 2023–present | South Africa U21 | 16 | (5) |
| 2024–present | South Africa | 1 | (0) |
Medal record
Representing South Africa
Men's field hockey
Africa Cup of Nations
| Gold medal – first place | 2025 Ismailia |
Junior Africa Cup
| Gold medal – first place | 2023 Ismailia |
- Updated on 22 June 2024

Calvin Davis (born 22 November 2003) is a South African field hockey player who plays for the South African national team. He competed in the 2024 Summer Olympics.

== Early life ==
He attended Kearsney College and studied at the University of Pretoria.

== Career ==
=== Under–21 ===
Davis made his debut for the 2023 Sultan of Johor Cup. He made the 2023 Junior Africa Cup in Ismailia and 2023 FIH Hockey Junior World Cup in Kuala Lumpur.

=== Senior national team ===
Davis made his debut for the Test Match India.
