= Simon Yorston =

New Zealand field hockey player

Personal information
- Full name: Simon William Yorston
- Born: 7 March 2000 (age 26) Chertsey, England

Sport
- Sport: Field hockey
- Position: Defence
Senior career
| Years | Team | Caps | Goals |
| 2019– | Canterbury | - | - |
| 2020 | Southern Alpiners | - | - |
National team
| Years | Team | Caps | Goals |
| 2022– | New Zealand | 23 | (0) |
Medal record
Men's field hockey
Representing New Zealand
Oceania Cup
| Silver medal – second place | 2023 Whangārei |
| Silver medal – second place | 2025 Darwin |

Simon William Yorston (born 7 March 2000) is a field hockey player from New Zealand, who plays as a defender.

== Personal life ==
Simon Yorston was born in Chertsey, England, and grew up in Christchurch, New Zealand.

Yorston is an alumnus of Christchurch Boys' High School.

== Career ==
=== National level ===
In national level competitions, Yorston represents his home association, Canterbury.

=== Black Sticks ===
Yorston received his first call up to the national squad in 2022. He made his debut later that year during the Trans–Tasman Series in Auckland. He was later named in the Black Sticks squad for the 2022 Commonwealth Games in Birmingham, however did not make an appearance during the competition.

In 2023, he was a member of the Black Sticks squad at the FIH World Cup in Bhubaneswar and Rourkela. He followed this up with appearances in the FIH Pro League, as well as the Oceania Cup in Whangārei, winning a silver medal at the latter.
