= Jaydon Brooker =

South African field hockey and cricket player (born 2005)

Personal information
- Born: 3 April 2005 (age 21) Kimberley, South Africa

Sport
- Sport: Field hockey
- Club: North-West University
Senior career
Years	Team	Caps	Goals
2024–present	North-West University	-	-
National team
Years	Team	Caps	Goals
2023–present	South Africa U21	12	(19)
2025–present	South Africa	11	(2)
Medal record
Representing South Africa
Men's field hockey
Africa Cup of Nations
Gold medal – first place	2025 Ismailia
Junior Africa Cup
Gold medal – first place	2024 Windhoek
- Updated on 19 November 2025

Jaydon Brooker (birth 3 April 2005) is a South African field hockey and cricket player who plays hockey for South Africa.

== International career ==
=== Under–21 ===
Brooker made his debut for the 2023 FIH Hockey Junior World Cup in Kuala Lumpur, and 2025 FIH Hockey Junior World Cup in India.

=== Senior national team ===
Brooker made his debut for the 2025 Men's Hockey Africa Cup of Nations. He made the 2025 Hockey Africa Cup of Nations in Ismailia, Egypt.

== Personal life ==
Brooker attended Jeppe High School for Boys and studied at the North-West University.

== Honours ==
=== South Africa U21 ===
- 2024 Hockey Junior Africa Cup – Top Goalscore and Player of the Tournament.
