= Men's Junior Africa Cup =

Under-21 field hockey tournament organised by AHF

Men's Hockey Junior Africa Cup
- Most recent season or competition: 2024 Men's Hockey Junior Africa Cup
- Formerly: Junior Africa Cup of Nations
- Sport: Field hockey
- Founded: 1978; 48 years ago
- No. of teams: 6
- Confederation: AfHF (Africa)
- Most recent champion: South Africa (6th title) (2024)
- Most titles: South Africa (6 titles)

The Men's Junior Africa Cup (JAC), formerly known as the Junior Africa Cup of Nations, is a men's international under-21 field hockey tournament organised by the African Hockey Federation. The tournament has been held since 1988 and serves as a qualification tournament for the Men's FIH Hockey Junior World Cup. Competitors must be under the age of 21 as of 31 December in the year before the tournament is held.

The tournament has been won by four different teams, South Africa has the most titles with six followed by Egypt with five titles. Ghana and Kenya both have one title.

== Results ==
| Year | Host | Final | | | Third place match | | | Number of teams |
| Year | Host | Winner | Score | Runner-up | Third place | Score | Fourth place | Number of teams |
|---|---|---|---|---|---|---|---|---|
| 1978 | Ibadan, Nigeria | Ghana | | Kenya | Nigeria | Only three teams. | | 3 |
| 1982 | Nairobi, Kenya | Kenya | | Zimbabwe | Only two teams. | | | 2 |
| 1984 | Cairo, Egypt | Egypt | | Zimbabwe | Kenya | Only three teams. | | 3 |
| 1989 | Morocco | Egypt | | Zimbabwe | Kenya | | Morocco | 4 |
| 1993 | Harare, Zimbabwe | Egypt | | Kenya | Zimbabwe | Only three teams. | | 3 |
| 1997 | Harare, Zimbabwe | Egypt | | South Africa | Zimbabwe | | Kenya | 4 |
| 2001 | Johannesburg, South Africa | South Africa | | Egypt | Zimbabwe | | Nigeria | 4 |
| 2004 | Cairo, Egypt | South Africa | | Egypt | Ghana | | Nigeria | 6 |
| 2008 | Cairo, Egypt | South Africa | | Egypt | Ghana | | Sudan | 6 |
| 2012; Details | Randburg, South Africa | South Africa | 1–1 (4–2 p.s.o.) | Egypt | Ghana | 4–2 | Kenya | 5 |
| 2016; Details | Windhoek, Namibia | Egypt | 3–2 | South Africa | Zimbabwe | 5–3 | Namibia | 5 |
| 2021 | Windhoek, Namibia | Cancelled due to the COVID-19 pandemic. | | | Cancelled | | | 5 |
| 2023; Details | Ismailia, Egypt | South Africa | 2–2 (4–3 p.s.o.) | Egypt | Kenya | 2–1 | Zimbabwe | 4 |
| 2024; Details | Windhoek, Namibia | South Africa | 5–0 | Namibia | Egypt | 2–2 (4–2 p.s.o.) | Kenya | 6 |
| 2027; Details | Nairobi, Kenya | | | | | | | |

=== Summary ===
| Team | Winners | Runners-up | Third place | Fourth place |
|---|---|---|---|---|
| South Africa | 6 (2001*, 2004, 2008, 2012*, 2023, 2024) | 2 (1997, 2016) | | |
| Egypt | 5 (1984*, 1989, 1993, 1997, 2016) | 5 (2001, 2004*, 2008*, 2012, 2023*) | 1 (2024) | |
| Kenya | 1 (1982*) | 2 (1978, 1993) | 3 (1984, 1989, 2023) | 3 (1997, 2012, 2024) |
| Ghana | 1 (1978) | | 3 (2004, 2008, 2012) | |
| Zimbabwe | | 3 (1982, 1984, 1989) | 4 (1993*, 1997*, 2001, 2016) | 1 (2023) |
| Namibia | | 1 (2024*) | | |
| Nigeria | | | 1 (1978*) | 2 (2001, 2004) |
| Namibia | | | | 1 (2016*) |
| Sudan | | | | 1 (2008) |
| Morocco | | | | 1 (1989*) |

* = host nation

=== Team appearances ===
| Team | (Nigeria) 1978 | (Kenya) 1982 | (Egypt) 1984 | (Morocco) 1989 | (Zimbabwe) 1993 | (Zimbabwe) 1997 | (South Africa) 2001 | (Egypt) 2004 | (Egypt) 2008 | (South Africa) 2012 | (Namibia) 2016 | (Egypt) 2023 | (Namibia) 2024 | Total |
|---|---|---|---|---|---|---|---|---|---|---|---|---|---|---|
| Egypt | – | – | 1st | 1st | 1st | 1st | 2nd | 2nd | 2nd | 2nd | 1st | 2nd | 3rd | 11 |
| Ghana | 1st | – | – | – | – | – | – | 3rd | 3rd | 3rd | – | WD | WD | 4 |
| Kenya | 2nd | 1st | 3rd | 3rd | 2nd | 4th | – | 5th | 6th | 4th | – | 3rd | 4th | 10 |
| Libya | – | – | – | – | – | – | – | – | 5th | – | – | – | – | 1 |
| Morocco | – | – | – | 4th | – | – | – | – | – | – | – | – | – | 1 |
| Namibia | – | – | – | – | – | – | – | – | – | – | 4th | – | 2nd | 2 |
| Nigeria | 3rd | – | – | – | – | – | 4th | 4th | – | – | – | WD | WD | 3 |
| South Africa | – | – | – | – | – | 2nd | 1st | 1st | 1st | 1st | 2nd | 1st | 1st | 7 |
| Sudan | – | – | – | – | – | – | – | – | 4th | – | – | – | – | 1 |
| Tanzania | – | – | – | – | – | – | – | – | – | – | 5th | – | – | 1 |
| Zambia | – | – | – | – | – | – | – | – | – | – | – | – | 6th | 1 |
| Zimbabwe | – | 2nd | 2nd | 2nd | 3rd | 3rd | 3rd | 6th | – | 5th | 3rd | 4th | 5th | 10 |
| Total | 3 | 2 | 3 | 4 | 3 | 4 | 4 | 6 | 6 | 5 | 5 | 4 | 6 | |

== See also ==
- Men's Hockey Africa Cup of Nations
- Women's Junior Africa Cup
