= South Africa men's national under-21 field hockey team =

South African under-21 field hockey team

South Africa
- Association: South African Hockey Association
- Confederation: AfHF (Africa)
- Head Coach: Guy Elliott
Home	Away

Junior World Cup
- Appearances: 7 (first in 2001)
- Best result: 9th (2021)

Junior Africa Cup
- Appearances: 7 (first in 1997)
- Best result: (gold) 1st (2001, 2004, 2008, 2012, 2023)
Medal record
Junior Africa Cup
Gold medal – first place	2001 Johannesburg
Gold medal – first place	2004 Cairo
Gold medal – first place	2008 Cairo
Gold medal – first place	2012 Randburg
Gold medal – first place	2023 Ismailia
Gold medal – first place	2024 Windhoek
Silver medal – second place	1997 Harare
Silver medal – second place	2016 Windhoek

The South Africa men's national under-21 field hockey team represents South Africa at international field hockey matches and tournaments.

== Tournament record ==
=== Junior World Cup ===
Junior World Cup record
Year	Host	Round	Pos	Pld	W	D	L	GF	GA	Squad
1979	Versailles, France	Banned (Note: South Africa was banned from international Hockey from 1964 onwards. South Africa was allowed to take part in international competitions from 1993 onwards.)								
1982	Kuala Lumpur, Malaysia	Banned								
1985	Vancouver, Canada	Banned								
1989	Ipoh, Malaysia	Banned								
1993	Terrassa, Spain	Did not qualify								
1997	Milton Keynes, England	Did not qualify								
2001	Hobart, Australia	Group stage	11th	8	2	3	3	17	20	
2005	Rotterdam, Netherlands	Group stage	13th	7	4	0	3	30	13	
2009	Johor Bahru, Malaysia; Singapore	Group stage	15th	8	1	3	4	16	20	
2013	New Delhi, India	Group stage	12th	5	1	0	4	4	12	
2016	Lucknow, India	Group stage	10th	5	2	0	3	11	13	Squad
2021	Bhubaneswar, India	Group stage	9th	6	3	1	2	23	16	Squad
2023	Kuala Lumpur, Malaysia	Group stage	10th	6	3	0	3	19	18	Squad
2025	Tamil Nadu, India	Group stage	12th	6	3	0	3	18	14	Squad
Total		9th	7/13	51	19	7	25	138	126	

=== Junior Africa Cup ===
- 1997 – (silver)
- 2001 – (gold)
- 2004 – (gold)
- 2008 – (gold)
- 2012 – (gold)
- 2016 – (silver)
- 2021 - Cancelled
- 2023 – (gold)
- 2024 – (gold)

=== Sultan of Johor Cup ===
- 2022 – 5th
- 2023 – 8th

== Current squad ==
=== FIH Hockey Junior World Cup Current squad ===
The squad was announced on 13 November 2023.

Head coach: Guy Elliott

No.	Pos.	Player	Date of birth (age)	Caps	Club
4		Nathan Ansell (Captain)	15 March 2002 (aged 20)	14	(South Africa) UCT Ikey Rangers
5		James Flint	6 April 2004 (aged 18)	9	(South Africa) Maties
6		Daniel Neuhoff	3 October 2004 (aged 18)	5	(South Africa) Maties
7		Hans Neethling	13 July 2002 (aged 20)	15	(South Africa) Maties
9		Cameron Le Forestier	4 September 2002 (aged 20)	21	(South Africa) UP Tuks
10		Ross Breytenbach	1 June 2004 (aged 18)	11	(South Africa) Jeppe
11		Damian Knott	15 April 2003 (aged 19)	15	(South Africa) WPCC
12		Sian Maart	30 March 2004 (aged 18)	4	(South Africa) UP Tuks
14		Caleb Oliphant	21 May 2002 (aged 20)	10	(South Africa) Maties
16		Thabang Jeyi	21 May 2003 (aged 19)	5	(South Africa) Langa
17		Ayakha Mthalane	5 June 2003 (aged 19)	15	(South Africa) UP Tuks
19	MF	Leruo Ditlhakanyane	20 July 2005 (aged 17)	4	(South Africa) D.H.S
21		Fawaaz Kahder	20 November 2002 (aged 20)	15	(South Africa) Beaulieu
22		Calvin Davis	22 November 2003 (aged 19)	10	(South Africa) UP Tuks
24	GK	Reece Govender	17 December 2002 (aged 20)	10	(South Africa) Wits
27	GK	Gianluca Virissimo	2 October 2003 (aged 19)	5	(South Africa) UCT Ikey Rangers
31		David Tshebi	21 December 2003 (aged 19)	4	(South Africa) Varsity
34		Jaydon Brooker	3 April 2005 (aged 17)	0	(South Africa) Jeppe

=== Junior Africa Hockey Cup Current squad ===
The squad was announced on 2 October February 2024.

Head coach: Guy Elliott

1. Brett Horn
2. Carlon Mentoor
3. Damian Knott
4. Daniel Den Bakker
5. Daniel Dillon (GK)
6. Daniel Neuhoff
7. Gianluca Virissimo (GK)
8. Jamie Seale
9. Jaydon Brooker
10. Kenton Melville
11. Leruo Dithlakanyane
12. Litha Kraai
13. Thabang Jeyi
14. Matthew De Oliveira
15. Reuben Sendzul
16. Sachin Padayache
17. Sian Maart
18. Viwe Mbata

== See also ==
- South Africa men's national field hockey team
- South Africa women's national under-21 field hockey team
