= Dylan Thomas (field hockey) =

New Zealand field hockey player (born 1996)

Personal information
- Full name: Dylan James Thomas
- Born: 14 February 1996 (age 30) Tokoroa, New Zealand
- Height: 1.93 m (6 ft 4 in)

Sport
- Sport: Field hockey
- Position: Forward
- Club: Central Falcons
Senior career
Years	Team	Caps	Goals
2015–2019	Central	36	24
2020–	Central Falcons	7	0
National team
Years	Team	Caps	Goals
2016	New Zealand U–21	10	(3)
2014–	New Zealand	32	(2)
Medal record
Men's field hockey
Representing New Zealand
Oceania Cup
Silver medal – second place	2025 Darwin
FIH Nations Cup
Gold medal – first place	2023–24 Gniezno

Dylan James Thomas (born 14 February 1996) is a New Zealand field hockey player, who plays as a forward.

== Personal life ==
Dylan Thomas was born and raised in Tokoroa, New Zealand.

In his youth, Thomas moved to Hastings, where he was a student at Hastings Boys' High School.

== Career ==
=== Domestic competitions ===
==== Ford NHL ====
Dylan Thomas was a member of the Central Mavericks in the Ford National Hockey League (NHL), representing the team from 2015 to 2019. During his time with the team, Thomas won bronze medal in the 2016 edition of the tournament.

==== Premier Hockey League ====
Following the overhaul of the NHL and subsequent introduction of the Premier Hockey League, Thomas was named in the Central Falcons. The league's inaugural edition was held in 2020, with the team taking home a gold medal.

=== National teams ===
==== Under-21 ====
In 2016, Thomas made two appearances for the New Zealand U-21 team. His first was at the Sultan of Johor Cup in Johor Bahru, followed by the FIH Junior World Cup in Lucknow.

==== Black Sticks ====
Thomas made his official debut for the Black Sticks in 2018, during a test series against Japan in Maibara.

Following his debut, Thomas was named in the Black Sticks squad on a permanent basis. His first major tournament with the team was the 2019 FIH Pro League. He followed this up with appearances in a test series against Japan in Stratford, as well as the FIH Olympic Qualifiers.

In 2020, Thomas was named in the Black Sticks squad for the 2021 Olympic Year.

=== International goals ===
Goal	Date	Location	Opponent	Score	Result	Competition	Ref.
1	8 March 2019	North Harbour Hockey Stadium, Auckland, New Zealand	Spain	3–3	3–1	2019 FIH Pro League	
2	28 February 2020	Ngā Puna Wai Sports Hub, Christchurch, New Zealand	Argentina	5–3	2–1	2020–21 FIH Pro League	
