= Hayden Phillips (field hockey) =

New Zealand field hockey player

Personal information
- Full name: Hayden Brian Phillips
- Born: 6 February 1998 (age 28) Palmerston North, New Zealand
- Height: 1.80 m (5 ft 11 in)
- Weight: 78 kg (172 lb)

Sport
- Sport: Field hockey
- Position: Midfielder
- Club: Holcombe
Senior career
Years	Team	Caps	Goals
2016–2018	Central	20	7
2019–present	Holcombe	-	-
National team
Years	Team	Caps	Goals
2016	New Zealand U21	3	-
2016–present	New Zealand	109	(9)
Medal record
Men's field hockey
Representing New Zealand
Commonwealth Games
Silver medal – second place	2018 Gold Coast	Team
Oceania Cup
Silver medal – second place	2017 Sydney
Silver medal – second place	2019 Rockhampton
Silver medal – second place	2023 Whangārei

Hayden Brian Phillips (born 6 February 1998) is a New Zealand field hockey player who plays as a midfielder for English club Holcombe.

== Early life ==
Phillips was born in Palmerston North in 1998. He went to school at Palmerston North Boys' High and lives 50 kilometres (31 mi) southwest in Levin.

== Playing career ==
Phillips played in the 2014 Summer Youth Olympics. He then made his senior debut in March 2016 and went on to represent New Zealand in the 2016 Sultan Azlan Shah Cup and 2016 Summer Olympics. Phillips moved to England in January 2020 to play for Holcombe alongside Barry Middleton. After taking a break from international hockey, Phillips returned to the Blacksticks Squad in 2022 playing against Australia in the Trans Tasman Series.
