= Sam Lane (field hockey) =

New Zealand field hockey player

Personal information
- Full name: Sam Garrett Lane
- Born: 30 April 1997 (age 29) Temuka, New Zealand
- Height: 1.83 m (6 ft 0 in)

Sport
- Sport: Field hockey
- Position: Forward
- Club: HC Oranje-Rood
National team
Years	Team	Caps	Goals
2016–	New Zealand	119	(42)
Medal record
Men's field hockey
Representing New Zealand
Oceania Cup
Silver medal – second place	2017 Sydney
Silver medal – second place	2019 Rockhampton
Silver medal – second place	2023 Whangārei
Silver medal – second place	2025 Darwin

Sam Garrett Lane (born 30 April 1997) is a New Zealand field hockey player.

== Personal life ==
Sam Lane was born in Christchurch, New Zealand and raised in Temuka, New Zealand. He started playing hockey when he was 3 years old. In early 2019, Lane tragically lost his mother, Margaret, after a long battle with cancer. Sam now works at Forsyth Barr, alongside playing for the Black Sticks Men's Hockey team.

== Career ==
=== Club level ===
In the New Zealand National Hockey League Lane plays for Canterbury.

In 2021, Lane signed for Belgium Hockey Club KHC Leuven for one season before joining the Dutch League representing HC Oranje-Rood for two seasons.

Lane returned to New Zealand in early 2024 after a foot injury cleared him from the remainder of his contract period.

Lane also competed in the 2025 Hockey India League. He was bought in the auction for 27Lakh by the Shrachi Rarh Bengal Tigers. The team went on to win the title, with Lane scoring the winning goal in the gold medal match.

=== National team ===
Sam Lane made his senior debut for the Black Sticks in 2016 during the Trans–Tasman Trophy against Australia. Since then, Lane has competed in both the Tokyo Olympics in 2021 and the Paris Olympics 2024.

During his career, Lane has medalled four times with the national side, at the 2024 Oceania Cup held in Darwin, Australia.

Since his debut in 2016, injuries have affected Lanes consistent flow of selection within the team. In 2017, Lane had an osteochondral break in his left knee, requiring two surgeries. This ruled Lane out for the 2018 Commonwealth Games held in Gold Coast, Australia. In 2024, Lane also suffered from a Jones fracture on his right foot, resulting in surgery 100 days out from the Paris Olympics.

==== International goals ====
Goal	Date	Location	Opponent	Score	Result	Competition	Ref.
1	20 November 2016	Lloyd Elsmore Hockey Stadium, Auckland, New Zealand	Australia	2–0	2–1	2016 Trans-Tasman Trophy	
2	17 March 2017	National Hockey Stadium, Wellington, New Zealand	Pakistan	1–0	3–2	Test Match	
3	18 March 2017	National Hockey Stadium, Wellington, New Zealand	Pakistan	1–0	2–2	Test Match	
4	23 March 2017	National Hockey Stadium, Wellington, New Zealand	Pakistan	1–1	1–1	Test Match	
5	23 April 2017	Tun Razak Hockey Stadium, Bandar Tun Razak, Malaysia	Malaysia	2–7	2–8	Test Match	
6	24 April 2017	Tun Razak Hockey Stadium, Bandar Tun Razak, Malaysia	Malaysia	1–0	3–3	Test Match	
7	2 May 2017	Azlan Shah Stadium, Ipoh, Malaysia	Japan	3–1	3–2	2017 Sultan Azlan Shah Cup	
8	26 June 2017	Stade Fallon, Brussels, Belgium	Belgium	1–2	2–3	Test Match	
9	14 October 2017	Sydney Olympic Park, Sydney, Australia	PNG	5–0	19–0	2017 Oceania Cup	
10	14 October 2017	Sydney Olympic Park, Sydney, Australia	PNG	10–0	19–0	2017 Oceania Cup	
11	14 October 2017	Sydney Olympic Park, Sydney, Australia	PNG	19–0	19–0	2017 Oceania Cup	
12	13 April 2019	Estadio Mundialista Luciana Aymar, Rosario, Argentina	Argentina	1–3	3–4	2019 FIH Pro League	
13	13 April 2019	Estadio Mundialista Luciana Aymar, Rosario, Argentina	Argentina	2–3	3–4	2019 FIH Pro League	
14	9 June 2019	Gerd-Wellen-Hockeystadion, Krefeld, Germany	Germany	3–2	3–3	2019 FIH Pro League	
