= 2017 Men's Pan American Cup (field hockey) =

International field hockey competition

Tournament details
- Host country: United States
- City: Lancaster
- Dates: 4–12 August
- Teams: 8 (from 1 confederation)
- Venue: Spooky Nook Sports

Final positions
- Champions: Argentina (3rd title)
- Runner-up: Canada
- Third place: United States

Tournament statistics
- Matches played: 20
- Goals scored: 103 (5.15 per match)
- Top scorer(s): (Argentina) Matías Paredes (Argentina) Gonzalo Peillat (7 goals)
- Best player: (Argentina) Matías Paredes

The 2017 Men's Pan American Cup was the fifth edition of the Men's Pan American Cup, the quadrennial men's international field hockey championship of the Americas organized by the Pan American Hockey Federation. It was held between 4 and 12 August 2017 in Lancaster, Pennsylvania, United States, simultaneously with the women's tournament.

The tournament doubled as the qualifier for two major international tournaments: the winner qualified directly to the 2018 World Cup, and the two teams not qualifying through the 2018 South American Games or the 2018 Central American and Caribbean Games qualified for the 2019 Pan American Games in Lima, Peru. Also, the top 6 teams qualified for the next Pan American Cup, while the bottom two need to compete in the Pan American Challenge.

Argentina won the tournament for the third time after defeating Canada 2–0 in the final. As they had already secured an automatic berth at the 2018 World Cup thanks to a second-place finish at the World League Semifinal in London, England, their quota was immediately awarded to first reserve team New Zealand.

== Qualification ==
The top six nations at the 2013 Pan American Cup qualified directly with the remaining two spots were assigned to the first and second-placed team at the 2015 Pan American Challenge, which was held in Chiclayo, Peru.

| Dates | Event | Location | Quotas | Qualifiers |
|---|---|---|---|---|
| 10–17 August 2013 | 2013 Men's Pan American Cup | Brampton, Canada | 6 | Argentina (1); Canada (11); Chile (27); Mexico (41); Trinidad and Tobago (33); United States (26) |
| 3–11 October 2015 | 2015 Pan American Challenge | Chiclayo, Peru | 2 | Brazil (29); Venezuela (48) |
| Total | | | 8 | |

== Results ==
All times are Eastern Daylight Time, (UTC−04:00)

=== First round ===
==== Pool A ====
| Pos | Team | Pld | W | D | L | GF | GA | GD | Pts | Qualification |
|---|---|---|---|---|---|---|---|---|---|---|
| 1 | Argentina | 3 | 3 | 0 | 0 | 27 | 2 | +25 | 9 | Semi-finals |
| 2 | United States (H) | 3 | 2 | 0 | 1 | 8 | 7 | +1 | 6 | Semi-finals |
| 3 | Chile | 3 | 1 | 0 | 2 | 9 | 12 | −3 | 3 | 5–8th place semi-finals |
| 4 | Venezuela | 3 | 0 | 0 | 3 | 0 | 23 | −23 | 0 | 5–8th place semi-finals |

Source: PAHF
Rules for classification: 1) points; 2) goal difference; 3) goals scored; 4) head-to-head result.
(H) Hosts

4 August 2017
10:00

| Chile | 6–0 | Venezuela |
|---|---|---|
| Becerra 25', 55'; Hurtado 32', 50'; Rodríguez 44', 48' | Report |

Umpires:
Peter Wright (RSA)
Oliver Hock (BRA)

4 August 2017
19:00

| Argentina | 6–0 | United States |
|---|---|---|
| Paredes 17', 30'; Peillat 21'; Merino 25', 60'; Gilardi 50' | Report |

Umpires:
Nazmi Kamarudin (MAS)
Tyler Klenk (CAN)

6 August 2017
17:00

| Chile | 2–9 | Argentina |
|---|---|---|
| Goñi 13'; Martín 54' | Report | Parades 6'; Peillat 7', 23', 29', 60'; Vila 21', 36'; Ganly 45'; Ortiz 58' |

Umpires:
Peter Wright (RSA)
Kevin George (TRI)

6 August 2017
19:00

| United States | 5–0 | Venezuela |
|---|---|---|
| Khokhar 13'; Cicchi 23'; Grassi 38'; Käppeler 44'; Sundeen 52' | Report |

Umpires:
Nazmi Kamarudin (MAS)
Oliver Hock (BRA)

8 August 2017
12:00

| Argentina | 12–0 | Venezuela |
|---|---|---|
| Peillat 11'; Mazzilli 13', 17', 59'; Menini 39'; Paredes 44'; Ibarra 45'; Casella 46', 53'; Ganly 50', 55'; Tarazona 60' | Report |

Umpires:
Gus Soteriades (USA)
Kevin George (TRI)

8 August 2017
19:00

| United States | 3–1 | Chile |
|---|---|---|
| Huisman 3'; Grassi 12'; Käppeler 19' | Report | Purcell 49' |

Umpires:
Peter Wright (RSA)
Tyler Klenk (CAN)

==== Pool B ====
| Pos | Team | Pld | W | D | L | GF | GA | GD | Pts | Qualification |
|---|---|---|---|---|---|---|---|---|---|---|
| 1 | Canada | 3 | 3 | 0 | 0 | 12 | 0 | +12 | 9 | Semi-finals |
| 2 | Trinidad and Tobago | 3 | 2 | 0 | 1 | 5 | 7 | −2 | 6 | Semi-finals |
| 3 | Brazil | 3 | 1 | 0 | 2 | 4 | 5 | −1 | 3 | 5–8th place semi-finals |
| 4 | Mexico | 3 | 0 | 0 | 3 | 3 | 12 | −9 | 0 | 5–8th place semi-finals |

Source: Panamhockey
Rules for classification: 1) points; 2) goal difference; 3) goals scored; 4) head-to-head result.

4 August 2017
12:00

| Canada | 4–0 | Trinidad and Tobago |
|---|---|---|
| Tupper 8'; Sarmento 23'; Johnston 29'; Smythe 51' | Report |

Umpires:
Diego Barbas (ARG)
Matias Barbosa (CHI)

4 August 2017
17:00

| Brazil | 3–1 | Mexico |
|---|---|---|
| López 7'; Vehrle-Smith 42'; Paixão 59' | Report | Chávez 57' |

Umpires:
Gus Soteriades (USA)
Manuel Sierra (VEN)

6 August 2017
10:00

| Brazil | 0–2 | Canada |
|---|---|---|
| | Report | van Son 38'; Pereira 51' |

Umpires:
Diego Barbas (ARG)
Ridge Bair (USA)

6 August 2017
12:00

| Trinidad and Tobago | 3–2 | Mexico |
|---|---|---|
| Emmanuel 14'; Byer 38'; Toussaint 57' | Report | Chavez 35'; Pedraza 52' |

Umpires:
Gus Soteriades (USA)
Matias Barbosa (CHI)

8 August 2017
10:00

| Trinidad and Tobago | 2–1 | Brazil |
|---|---|---|
| Pascal 6'; Marcano 47' | Report | Sousa 41' |

Umpires:
Diego Barbas (ARG)
Manuel Sierra (VEN)

8 August 2017
17:00

| Canada | 6–0 | Mexico |
|---|---|---|
| B. Panesar 22'; Tupper 24'; Johnston 42', 50' van Son 43'; Pereria 55' | Report |

Umpires:
Ridge Blair (USA)
Nazmi Kamarudin (MAS)

=== Fifth to eighth place classification ===
5–8th place semi-finals
11 August
Chile | 8
Mexico | 1
11 August
Venezuela | 1
Brazil | 4

Fifth place
12 August
Chile | 1 (2)
Brazil (p.s.o.) | 2 (4)
Seventh place
12 August
Mexico | 1
Venezuela | 0

==== 5–8th place semi-finals ====
11 August 2017
09:15

| Chile | 8–1 | Mexico |
|---|---|---|
| Martín 21'; Richter 22', 45'; Hurtado 40'; Contardo 43'; Rodríguez 56', 58'; Becerra 60' | Report | Mendez 37' |

Umpires:
Manuel Sierra (VEN)
Oliver Hock (BRA)

11 August 2017
11:30

| Venezuela | 1–4 | Brazil |
|---|---|---|
| Escobar 60' | Report | Y. van der Heijden 7'; Lopez 48'; Sousa 54'; Paixão 59' |

Umpires:
Kevin George (TRI)
Tyler Klenk (CAN)

==== Seventh place game ====
12 August 2017
10:00

| Mexico | 1–0 | Venezuela |
|---|---|---|
| Mendez 17' | Report |

Umpires:
Oliver Hock (BRA)
Matias Barbosa (CHI)

==== Fifth place game ====
12 August 2017
12:15

| Chile | 2–2 | Brazil |
|---|---|---|
| Rodríguez 20', 51' | Report | Lopez 10'; Paixão 37' |
Penalties
| Pizarro (penalty shoot-out missed); Hurtado (penalty shoot-out scored); Becerra (penalty shoot-out scored); Esparza (penalty shoot-out missed) | 2–4 | (penalty shoot-out scored) Borges; (penalty shoot-out scored) Imer; (penalty shoot-out missed) P. van der Heijden; (penalty shoot-out scored) Y. van der Heijden; (penalty shoot-out scored) Paixão |

Umpires:
Ridge Bair (USA)
Manuel Sierra (VEN)

=== First to fourth place classification ===
Semi-finals
10 August
Argentina | 8
Trinidad and Tobago | 1
10 August
United States | 1 (3)
Canada (p.s.o.) | 1 (4)

Final
12 August
Argentina | 2
Canada | 0
Third place
12 August
Trinidad and Tobago | 0
United States | 3

==== Semi-finals ====
10 August 2017
17:00

| Argentina | 8–1 | Trinidad and Tobago |
|---|---|---|
| Paredes 3', 4', 5'; Ortiz 8'; Peillat 10'; Tarazona 27', 47'; Ganly 41' | Report | Toussaint 38' |

Umpires:
Nazmi Kamarudin (MAS)
Gus Soteriades (USA)

10 August 2017
19:15

| Canada | 1–1 | United States |
|---|---|---|
| Johnston 8' | Report | Singh 14' |
Penalties
| Johnston (penalty shoot-out scored); Pereira (penalty shoot-out scored); S. Panesar (penalty shoot-out missed); B. Panesar (penalty shoot-out scored) van Son (penalty shoot-out scored) | 4–3 | (penalty shoot-out scored) Harris; (penalty shoot-out missed) Huisman; (penalty shoot-out missed) Dhadwal; (penalty shoot-out scored) Sundeen; (penalty shoot-out scored) Käppeler |

Umpires:
Peter Wright (RSA)
Diego Barbas (ARG)

==== Third place game ====
12 August 2017
15:30

| Trinidad and Tobago | 0–3 | United States |
|---|---|---|
| | Report | Sundeen 19'; Cicchi 22'; Holt 60' |

Umpires:
Diego Barbas (ARG)
Tyler Klenk (CAN)

==== Final ====
12 August 2017
17:45

| Argentina | 2–0 | Canada |
|---|---|---|
| Ortiz 5'; Vila 25' | Report |

Umpires:
Peter Wright (RSA)
Nazmi Kamarudin (MAS)

== Statistics ==
=== Final standings ===
| Rank | Team |
|---|---|
| 1 | Argentina |
| 2 | Canada |
| 3 | United States |
| 4 | Trinidad and Tobago |
| 5 | Brazil |
| 6 | Chile |
| 7 | Mexico |
| 8 | Venezuela |

=== Awards ===
| Top Goalscorer | Player of the Tournament | Goalkeeper of the Tournament | Young Player of the Tournament |
|---|---|---|---|
| (Argentina) Matías Paredes (Argentina) Gonzalo Peillat | (Argentina) Matías Paredes | (Canada) David Carter | (Trinidad and Tobago) Tariq Marcano |

== See also ==
- 2017 Women's Pan American Cup
