= 2025 Men's Pan American Cup =

International field hockey competition

Tournament details
- Host country: Uruguay
- City: Montevideo
- Dates: 24 July – 3 August
- Teams: 8 (from 1 confederation)
- Venue: Cancha Celeste

Final positions
- Champions: Argentina (5th title)
- Runner-up: United States
- Third place: Canada

Tournament statistics
- Matches played: 15
- Goals scored: 91 (6.07 per match)
- Top scorer: (Argentina) Tomás Domene (13 goals)
- Best player: (Argentina) Tomás Domene
- Best goalkeeper: (United States) Jonathan Klages

The 2025 Men's Pan American Cup was the seventh edition of the Men's Pan American Cup, the quadrennial international men's field hockey championship of the Americas organised by the Pan American Hockey Federation. The tournament was held alongside the women's tournament at the Cancha Celeste in Montevideo, Uruguay from 24 July to 3 August 2025.

Argentina were the three-time defending champions and defended their title with a win over the United States. As a result, they qualified for the 2026 Men's FIH Hockey World Cup in the Netherlands and Belgium. The next three best ranked teams qualified for the 2026 World Cup Qualifiers.

== Qualification ==
The tournament included eight teams: the six highest ranked teams from the 2022 Pan American Cup, the host country if not already qualified, and the winner from the 2024 Pan American Challenge.

Argentina, Brazil, Canada, Chile, Mexico and the United States qualified from the 2022 Pan American Cup. Uruguay qualified as host country as they did not qualify via the Pan American Cup. Finally, Trinidad and Tobago qualified as the winners from the 2024 Pan American Challenge.

Dates	Event	Location	Quotas	Qualifier(s)
20–30 January 2022	2022 Pan American Cup	Santiago, Chile	6	Argentina; Brazil; Canada; Chile; Mexico; United States
—N/a	Host country	—N/a	1	Uruguay
6–14 September 2024	2024 Pan American Challenge	Lima, Peru	1	Trinidad and Tobago
Total			8	

== Squads ==
Argentina

Head coach: Lucas Rey

1. Tomás Santiago (GK)
5. Facundo Zárate
7. Nicolás Keenan
9. Maico Casella
10. Nicolás Della Torre
11. Lucas Toscani
15. Tomás Ruiz
16. Joaquín Toscani
20. Matías Andreotti
21. Tomás Domene
22. Matías Rey (C)
23. Lucas Martínez
26. Nicolás Cicileo
27. Tadeo Marcucci
29. Thomas Habif
31. Bautista Capurro
33. Lucio Méndez
42. Gonzalo Yanello (GK)
Brazil

Head coach: Cláudio Rocha

1. Daniel Tatara (GK)
2. Bruno Mendonça
3. Matheus Nascimento
4. Matheus de Oliveira
5. Mateus Santos
6. Adam Imer
7. André Patrocínio (C)
8. Yuri van der Heijden
9. Stéphane Smith
10. Joaquín López
11. Lucas Varela
12. Arthur Giro
13. Lucas Lemos
14. Patrick van der Heijden
18. Gustavo Felinto
19. Vinícius Vaz
28. Fábio Assis
32. Bento Caria (GK)
Canada

Head coach: (South Africa) Patrick Tshutshani

4. Roopkanwar Dhillon
5. Devohn Noronha-Teixeira
6. Avjot Buttar
7. Matthew Sarmento (C)
9. Robin Thind
10. Jude Nicholson
11. Balraj Panesar
13. Brendan Guraliuk
14. Manveer Jhamat
15. Sean Davis
18. Rowan Childs
19. Gavin Bains
24. Flynn McCulloch
25. Harbir Sidhu
26. Samuel Cabral
30. Ethan McTavish (GK)
33. Thomson Harris
34. Kiefer McNaughton (GK)
Chile

Head coach: Emiliano Monteleone

1. Agustín Araya (GK)
2. Agustín Amoroso
5. Adrián Henríquez (GK)
6. Vicente Goñi (C)
8. Alexei de Witt
9. José Maldonado
11. Kay Gesswein
13. Andrés Pizarro (C)
14. Juan Amoroso
15. José Hurtado
20. Raimundo Valenzuela
25. Agustín Valenzuela
27. Sebastián Wolansky
28. Nils Strabucchi (C)
29. Luis Valenzuela
30. Álvaro García
36. Tomás Hasson
40. Felipé Duisberg
Mexico
United States

Head coach: Allan Law

1. Jonathan Klages (GK)
2. Sekayi Charasika
5. Patrick Harris
7. Finlay Quaile
8. Jatin Sharma
10. Alberto Montilla
11. Marius Leser
12. Ajai Dhadwal (C)
14. Aki Käppeler
15. Kei Käppeler
17. Christian DeAngelis
23. Kai Kokolakis
27. Gerald Cutone
29. Emil Collins (GK)
30. Michael Mendoza
32. Mehtab Grewal
33. Jack Heldens
34. Wyatt Kormos-Katz
Uruguay

== Preliminary round ==
All times are local (UTC−3).

=== Pool A ===
Pos	Team	Pld	W	D	L	GF	GA	GD	Pts	Qualification
1	Argentina	3	3	0	0	28	0	+28	9	Semi-finals
2	United States	3	2	0	1	7	4	+3	6	Semi-finals
3	Brazil	3	1	0	2	2	15	−13	3	Crossovers
4	Uruguay (H)	3	0	0	3	2	20	−18	0	Crossovers

Source: FIH
Rules for classification: 1) points; 2) matches won; 3) goal difference; 4) goals for; 5) head-to-head result; 6) field goals scored.
(H) Hosts

25 July 2025
11:30

Argentina	13–0	Brazil
Casella 18'; Della Torre 19', 38', 42'; Domene 24', 26', 32', 33', 43'; Capurro 36'; Martínez 51', 53'; L. Toscani 59'	Report

Umpires:
Guillermo Poblete (CHI)
Alex Miles (CAN)

25 July 2025
19:30

United States	6–1	Uruguay
Kormos-Katz 4'; Grewal 10'; A. Käppeler 22', 46'; Charasika 37'; Leser 41'	Report	Casal 57'

Umpires:
Tyler Klenk (CAN)
Juan Rodríguez (ARG)

27 July 2025
11:30

United States	0–3	Argentina
	Report	Casella 24', 54'; Della Torre 39'

Umpires:
Shane Lewis (BAR)
Tyler Klenk (CAN)

27 July 2025
19:30

Brazil	2–1	Uruguay
Patrocínio 18'; Imer 36'	Report	Martinoni 24'

Umpires:
Benjamin Peters (USA)
Rawi Anbananthan (MAS)

29 July 2025
11:30

Brazil	0–1	United States
	Report	Leser 28'

Umpires:
Irene Presenqui (ARG)
Guillermo Poblete (CHI)

29 July 2025
19:30

Argentina	12–0	Uruguay
L. Toscani 4', 51'; Domene 12', 31'; Capurro 29'; Méndez 30', 38'; Della Torre 51', 52'; Ruiz 53'; J. Toscani 59'; Marcucci 60'	Report

Umpires:
Ayanna McClean (TTO)
Jonathan Altamirano (MEX)

=== Pool B ===
Pos	Team	Pld	W	D	L	GF	GA	GD	Pts	Qualification
1	Chile	3	3	0	0	14	0	+14	9	Semi-finals
2	Canada	3	2	0	1	13	3	+10	6	Semi-finals
3	Mexico	3	1	0	2	6	15	−9	3	Crossovers
4	Trinidad and Tobago (Note: Trinidad & Tobago withdrew due to not receiving funds to travel.)	3	0	0	3	0	15	−15	0	Crossovers

Source: FIH
Rules for classification: 1) points; 2) matches won; 3) goal difference; 4) goals for; 5) head-to-head result; 6) field goals scored.
Notes:

24 July 2025
09:30

Canada	8–1	Mexico
Sarmento 23'; Childs 25'; Nicholson 30', 53'; Thind 38', 39', 59'; Guraliuk 47'	Report	Gómez 20'

Umpires:
Benjamin Peters (USA)
Shane Lewis (BAR)

24 July 2025
17:30

Chile	5–0 (Note: The match resulted in a walkover, after the Trinidad & Tobago team arrived late and did not made it in time for the game.)	Trinidad and Tobago
	Report

26 July 2025
09:30

Mexico	5–0	Trinidad and Tobago
	Report

26 July 2025
17:30

Chile	2–0	Canada
Maldonado 7'; Pizarro 45'	Report

Umpires:
Irene Presenqui (ARG)
Jonathan Altamirano (MEX)

28 July 2025
09:30

Canada	5–0	Trinidad and Tobago
	Report

28 July 2025
17:30

Mexico	0–7	Chile
	Report	Hurtado 27'; J. Amoroso 30', 34', 48'; A. Amoroso 40'; Wolansky 44'; Strabucchi 46'

Umpires:
Alex Miles (CAN)
Juan Rodríguez (ARG)

== Classification round ==
=== Bracket ===
Crossover
31 July
Brazil	5
Trinidad and Tobago	0
31 July
Mexico	4
Uruguay	1

Fifth place
2 August
Brazil	2 (0)
Mexico (p.s.o.)	2 (3)
Seventh place
2 August
Trinidad and Tobago	0
Uruguay	5

=== Crossovers ===
31 July 2025
09:30

Brazil	5–0	Trinidad and Tobago
	Report

31 July 2025
17:00

Uruguay	1–4	Mexico
Periero 57'	Report	Sandoval 6', 59'; Gómez 20'; Hernández 60'

Umpires:
Alex Miles (CAN)
Juan Rodríguez (ARG)

=== Seventh and eighth place ===
2 August 2025
09:30

Trinidad and Tobago	0–5	Uruguay
	Report

=== Fifth and sixth place ===
2 August 2025
16:00

Brazil	2–2	Mexico
Lopez 15'; Varela 41'	Report	Gómez 4'; Sandoval 19'
Penalties
Smith (penalty shoot-out missed); Assis (penalty shoot-out missed); Santos (penalty shoot-out missed)	0–3	(penalty shoot-out scored) Villegas; (penalty shoot-out missed) Estrada; (penalty shoot-out scored) Castillo; (penalty shoot-out scored) Gómez

Umpires:
Guillermo Poblete (CHI)
Juan Rodríguez (ARG)

== Medal round ==
=== Bracket ===
Crossover
1 August
Argentina	9
Canada	1
1 August
Chile	1 (1)
United States (p.s.o.)	1 (3)

Final
3 August
Argentina	10
United States	0
Third place
3 August
Canada	2
Chile	1

=== Semi-finals ===
1 August 2025
09:30

Argentina	9–1	Canada
Domene 5', 12', 35', 41'; Della Torre 13', 44', 60'; Keenan 15'; L. Toscani 40'	Report	Nicholson 4'

Umpires:
Rawi Anbananthan (MAS)
Benjamin Peters (USA)

1 August 2025
17:00

Chile	1–1	United States
Strabucchi 20'	Report	Kormos-Katz 9'
Penalties
Hurtado (penalty shoot-out missed); García (penalty shoot-out missed); Amoroso (penalty shoot-out missed); Gesswein (penalty shoot-out scored)	1–3	(penalty shoot-out missed) K. Käppeler; (penalty shoot-out scored) Heldens; (penalty shoot-out scored) Charasika; (penalty shoot-out scored) Leser

Umpires:
Tyler Klenk (CAN)
Shane Lewis (BAR)

=== Third and fourth place ===
3 August 2025
10:00

Canada	2–1	Chile
Davis 8'; Sarmento 47'	Report	J. Amoroso 54'

Umpires:
Benjamin Peters (USA)
Jonathan Altamirano (MEX)

=== Final ===
3 August 2025
15:00

Argentina	10–0	United States
Domene 14', 56'; Capurro 18', 51'; L. Toscani 26'; Della Torre 29'; Méndez 41'; Marcucci 45+', 59'; Martínez 53'	Report

Umpires:
Tyler Klenk (CAN)
Shane Lewis (BAR)

== Final standings ==
Pos	Team	Qualification
1st place, gold medalist(s)	Argentina	2026 FIH Hockey World Cup
2nd place, silver medalist(s)	United States	2026 World Cup Qualifiers
3rd place, bronze medalist(s)	Canada	2026 World Cup Qualifiers
4	Chile	2026 World Cup Qualifiers
5	Mexico	
6	Brazil	
7	Uruguay (H)	
WD	Trinidad and Tobago	Withdrew

Source: FIH
(H) Host

== Goalscorers ==
There were 91 goals scored in 15 matches, for an average of 6.07 goals per match.

13 goals

- (Argentina) Tomás Domene

10 goals

- (Argentina) Nicolás Della Torre

6 goals

- (Argentina) Lucas Toscani

4 goals

- (Argentina) Bautista Capurro
- (Chile) Juan Amoroso

3 goals

- (Argentina) Maico Casella
- (Argentina) Lucas Martínez
- (Argentina) Tadeo Marcucci
- (Argentina) Lucio Méndez
- (Canada) Jude Nicholson
- (Canada) Robin Thind
- (Mexico) Jorge Gómez
- (Mexico) Alexander Sandoval

2 goals

- (Canada) Matthew Sarmento
- (Chile) Nils Strabucchi
- (United States) Aki Käppeler
- (United States) Wyatt Kormos-Katz
- (United States) Marius Leser

1 goal

- (Argentina) Nicolás Keenan
- (Argentina) Tomás Ruiz
- (Argentina) Joaquín Toscani
- (Brazil) Adam Imer
- (Brazil) Joaquín Lopez
- (Brazil) André Patrocínio
- (Brazil) Lucas Varela
- (Canada) Rowan Childs
- (Canada) Sean Davis
- (Canada) Brendan Guraliuk
- (Chile) Agustín Amoroso
- (Chile) José Hurtado
- (Chile) José Maldonado
- (Chile) Andrés Pizarro
- (Chile) Sebastián Wolansky
- (Mexico) Erick Hernánde
- (United States) Sekayi Charasika
- (United States) Mehtab Grewal
- (Uruguay) Juan Casal
- (Uruguay) Gonzalo Martinoni
- (Uruguay) Matias Periero

Source: FIH

== See also ==
- 2025 Women's Pan American Cup
- 2024 Men's Pan American Challenge
