= Field hockey at the 2023 Pan American Games – Men's tournament =

Men's field hockey at the 2023 Pan American Games

Tournament details
- Host country: Chile
- City: Santiago
- Dates: 25 October – 3 November
- Teams: 8 (from 1 confederation)
- Venue(s): Centro Deportivo de Hockey Césped

Final positions
- Champions: Argentina (11th title)
- Runner-up: Chile
- Third place: Canada

Tournament statistics
- Matches played: 20
- Goals scored: 129 (6.45 per match)
- Top scorer(s): (Argentina) Tomas Domene (14 goals)

The men's field hockey tournament at the 2023 Pan American Games was the 15th edition of the field hockey event for men at the Pan American Games. It took place over a ten-day period beginning on 25 October, and culminating with the medal finals on 3 November.

Three-time defending champions Argentina won their 11th gold medal by defeating the hosts Chile 3–1 in the final, who reached the final for the first time. Canada won the bronze medal by defeating the United States 3–2. As winners Argentina qualified directly for the 2024 Summer Olympics in Paris, France.

== Qualification ==
A total of eight teams qualified to compete at the games. As host nation, Chile were given automatic qualification. The top two teams at both the 2022 South American Games and 2023 Central American and Caribbean Games also qualified. The remaining qualification quotas came from the 2022 Pan American Cup. As Chile finished in the top two at the 2022 South American Games, their qualification quota was added to the 2022 Pan American Cup, meaning four teams qualified from the tournament. If Canada and/or the United States had still not qualified, a play-off between the nations and the third ranked at the Pan American Cups would have taken place. As both nations qualified, the play-off was not necessary and the next best placed team at each Pan American Cup (that has not already qualified) qualified. On 13 July 2023, the Pan American Hockey Federation announced the qualified teams and pools for the event.

=== Qualified teams ===
Qualification	Date	Host	Quota(s)	Qualified team
Host country	—		~~1~~	—
2022 Pan American Cup	20–30 January	(Chile) Santiago	~~2~~ 4	Canada; United States; Brazil; Peru
2022 South American Games	3–11 October	(Paraguay) Asunción	2	Argentina; Chile
2023 Central American and Caribbean Games	28 June – 6 July	(Dominican Republic) Santo Domingo	2	Mexico; Trinidad and Tobago
Total			8	

- Chile finished in the top two at the 2022 South American Games, meaning the host nation quota was reallocated as an additional quota through the 2022 Pan American Cup.
- Since Canada and the USA qualified through the Pan American Cup, an additional spot was available through the event.

== Preliminary round ==
All times are local (UTC−4).

=== Pool A ===
Pos	Team	Pld	W	D	L	GF	GA	GD	Pts	Qualification
1	Argentina	3	3	0	0	35	2	+33	9	Semi-finals
2	Chile (H)	3	2	0	1	21	3	+18	6	Semi-finals
3	Mexico	3	1	0	2	7	16	−9	3	5th–8th classification
4	Peru	3	0	0	3	1	43	−42	0	5th–8th classification

Source: FIH
Rules for classification: 1) points; 2) matches won; 3) goal difference; 4) goals for; 5) head-to-head result; 6) field goals for.
(H) Hosts

25 October 2023
17:30

Argentina	10–1	Mexico
Domene 7', 12', 27', 48'; Mazzilli 13'; Toscani 29'; Keenan 35'; Casella 54'; Della Torre 55', 58'	Report	Guzmán 20'

Umpires:
Tyler Klenk (CAN)
Reinier Diaz (CUB)

25 October 2023
19:30

Chile	15–0	Peru
Hurtado 3'; Fel. Renz 5', 12'; Fer. Renz 10', 45'; Troncoso 16'; Richter 22'; Pizarro 35', 55'; Amoroso 44', 54'; Becerra 48'; Maldonado 48'; Valenzuela 50'; Wolansky 53'	Report

Umpires:
Ilanggo Kanabathu (MAS)
Benjamin Peters (USA)

27 October 2023
17:30

Mexico	6–1	Peru
Estrada 15'; Sosa 30'; Villegas 34'; Muñoz 35'; Leon 57', 59'	Report	Contreras 26'

Umpires:
Oliver Höck (BRA)
Federico Silva (ARG)

27 October 2023
19:30

Chile	1–3	Argentina
Amoroso 60'	Report	Casella 16'; Domene 20', 48'

Umpires:
Tyler Klenk (CAN)
Benjamin Peters (USA)

29 October 2023
11:30

Argentina	22–0	Peru
Domene 3', 7', 9', 24', 27', 32', 41', 48'; Keenan 8', 24', 34'; Casella 15', 21'; Mazzilli 18'; Martínez 18', 49'; Toscani 37', 42', 44', 58'; Monja 53', 55'	Report

Umpires:
Jonathan Altamirano (MEX)
Reinier Diaz (CUB)

29 October 2023
19:30

Mexico	0–5	Chile
	Report	Gesswein 9'; Strabucchi 13'; Amoroso 33'; Hurtado 39'; Becerra 56'

Umpires:
Oliver Höck (BRA)
Ilanggo Kanabathu (MAS)

=== Pool B ===
Pos	Team	Pld	W	D	L	GF	GA	GD	Pts	Qualification
1	Canada	3	3	0	0	8	1	+7	9	Semi-finals
2	United States	3	2	0	1	12	4	+8	6	Semi-finals
3	Brazil	3	1	0	2	3	8	−5	3	5th–8th classification
4	Trinidad and Tobago	3	0	0	3	2	12	−10	0	5th–8th classification

Source: FIH
Rules for classification: 1) points; 2) matches won; 3) goal difference; 4) goals for; 5) head-to-head result; 6) field goals for.

25 October 2023
09:30

Canada	2–0	Brazil
Johnston 19'; Scholfield 41'	Report

Umpires:
Federico Silva (ARG)
Jonathan Altamirano (MEX)

25 October 2023
11:30

United States	6–1	Trinidad and Tobago
A. Käppeler 2'; Harris 13'; Heldens 28'; Kokolakis 43'; Leser 50'; Quaile 51'	Report	Te. Marcano 55'

Umpires:
Gabriel Labate (ARG)
Guillermo Poblete Luna (CHI)

27 October 2023
09:30

Brazil	2–1	Trinidad and Tobago
Patrocínio 2'; Vehrle-Smith 6'	Report	Pierre 33'

Umpires:
Reinier Díaz (CUB)
Hugo Romero (PAR)

27 October 2023
11:30

United States	1–2	Canada
A. Käppeler 10'	Report	Van Son 28'; Johnston 41'

Umpires:
Gabriel Labate (ARG)
Ilanggo Kanabathu (MAS)

29 October 2023
09:30

Canada	4–0	Trinidad and Tobago
Sarmiento 7'; Davis 30'; Johnston 31'; Kirkpatrick 44'	Report

Umpires:
Guillermo Poblete Luna (CHI)
Fabián Romero (PAR)

29 October 2023
17:30

Brazil	1–5	United States
Lopez 43'	Report	Kokolakis 11'; A. Käppeler 13', 28', 30', 34'

Umpires:
Tyler Klenk (CAN)
Federico Silva (ARG)

== Fifth to eight place classification ==
=== Bracket ===
Cross-overs
1 November
Mexico	3 (2)
Trinidad and Tobago	3 (0)
1 November
Brazil	8
Peru	1

Fifth place
3 November
Mexico	0
Brazil	2
Seventh place
3 November
Trinidad and Tobago	10
Peru	0

=== Cross-overs ===
1 November 2023
13:30

Mexico	3–3	Trinidad and Tobago
Hernández 24', 53'; Amador 30'	Report	Te. Marcano 8'; Ta. Marcano 38'; Pierre 40'
Penalties
Villegas (penalty shoot-out missed); Hernández (penalty shoot-out missed); Estrada (penalty shoot-out scored); Benedith (penalty shoot-out missed); Castillo (penalty shoot-out scored)	2–0	(penalty shoot-out missed) Te. Marcano; (penalty shoot-out missed) Pierre; (penalty shoot-out missed) Vieira; (penalty shoot-out missed) Ta. Marcano

Umpires:
Oliver Höck (BRA)
Reinier Diaz (CUB)

1 November 2023
15:45

Brazil	8–1	Peru
Patrocínio 5'; Paixão 16', 36'; Martins 25'; Vehrle-Smith 29'; Luduena 41'; Lopez 45'; Imer 51'	Report	Rehder 5'

Umpires:
Guillermo Poblete Luna (CHI)
Jonathan Altamirano (MEX)

=== Seventh and eighth place ===
3 November 2023
09:30

Trinidad and Tobago	10–0	Peru
Daniel 6'; Te. Marcano 8', 11', 19', 43', 43', 56'; Ta. Marcano 13', 25'; Phillip 51'	Report

Umpires:
Oliver Höck (BRA)
Jonathan Altamirano (MEX)

=== Fifth and sixth place ===
3 November 2023
11:45

Mexico	0–2	Brazil
	Report	Vehrle-Smith 26', 28'

Umpires:
Benjamin Peters (USA)
Fabián Romero (PAR)

== Medal round ==
=== Bracket ===
Semi-finals
1 November
Argentina	2
United States	0
1 November
Canada	1 (2)
Chile	1 (3)

Gold medal match
3 November
Argentina	3
Chile	1
Bronze medal match
3 November
United States	2
Canada	3

=== Semi-finals ===
1 November 2023
18:00

Argentina	2–0	United States
Martínez 22'; Tarazona 34'	Report

Umpires:
Tyler Klenk (CAN)
Ilanggo Kanabathu (MAS)

1 November 2023
20:15

Canada	1–1	Chile
Johnston 25'	Report	Becerra 52'
Penalties
Johnston (penalty shoot-out missed); Panesar (penalty shoot-out missed); Van Son (penalty shoot-out scored); Pereira (penalty shoot-out scored); Guraliuk (penalty shoot-out missed)	2–3	(penalty shoot-out scored) Hurtado; (penalty shoot-out missed) Rodríguez; (penalty shoot-out scored) Becerra; (penalty shoot-out missed) Gesswein; (penalty shoot-out scored) Amoroso

Umpires:
Gabriel Labate (ARG)
Benjamin Peters (USA)

=== Bronze medal match ===
3 November 2023
17:30

United States	2–3	Canada (bronze)
De Angelis 29'; A. Käppeler 54'	Report	Guraliuk 11'; Boothroyd 39'; Scholfield 51'

Umpires:
Gabriel Labate (ARG)
Federico Silva (ARG)

=== Gold medal match ===
3 November 2023
19:45

(gold) Argentina	3–1	Chile (silver)
Martínez 8', 51'; Bugallo 59'	Report	Richter 45'

Umpires:
Tyler Klenk (CAN)
Ilanggo Kanabathu (MAS)

== Statistics ==
=== Final standings ===
Pos	Team	Qualification
1st place, gold medalist(s)	Argentina	2024 Summer Olympics
2nd place, silver medalist(s)	Chile (H)	2024 FIH Hockey Olympic Qualifiers
3rd place, bronze medalist(s)	Canada	2024 FIH Hockey Olympic Qualifiers
4	United States	
5	Brazil	
6	Mexico	
7	Trinidad and Tobago	
8	Peru	

Source: FIH
(H) Host

=== Goalscorers ===
There were 129 goals scored in 20 matches, for an average of 6.45 goals per match.

14 goals

- (Argentina) Tomas Domene

8 goals

- (Trinidad and Tobago) Teague Marcano

7 goals

- (United States) Aki Käppeler

5 goals

- (Argentina) Lucas Martínez
- (Argentina) Lucas Toscani

4 goals

- (Argentina) Maico Casella
- (Argentina) Nicolás Keenan
- (Brazil) Stéphane Vehrle-Smith
- (Canada) Gordon Johnston
- (Chile) Juan Amoroso

3 goals

- (Chile) Franco Becerra
- (Trinidad and Tobago) Tariq Marcano

2 goals

- (Argentina) Nicolás Della Torre
- (Argentina) Agustín Mazzilli
- (Argentina) Federico Monja
- (Brazil) Joaquín Lopez
- (Brazil) Lucas Paixão
- (Brazil) André Patrocínio
- (Canada) Oliver Scholfield
- (Chile) José Hurtado
- (Chile) Andrés Pizarro
- (Chile) Felipe Renz
- (Chile) Fernando Renz
- (Chile) Axel Richter
- (Mexico) Erick Hernández
- (Mexico) Miguel Leon
- (Trinidad and Tobago) Mickel Pierre
- (United States) Kai Kokolakis

1 goal

- (Argentina) Agustín Bugallo
- (Argentina) Santiago Tarazona
- (Brazil) Adam Imer
- (Brazil) Eduardo Luduena
- (Brazil) Gabriel Martins
- (Canada) Fin Boothroyd
- (Canada) Sean Michael Davis
- (Canada) Branden Guraliuk
- (Canada) James Kirkpatrick
- (Canada) Matthew Sarmento
- (Canada) Floris van Son
- (Chile) Kay Gesswein
- (Chile) José Maldonado
- (Chile) Nils Stabucchi
- (Chile) Axel Troncoso
- (Chile) Raimundo Valenzuela
- (Chile) Sebastián Wolansky
- (Mexico) Kevin Amador
- (Mexico) Jorge Estrada
- (Mexico) Matías Guzman
- (Mexico) Pablo Muñoz
- (Mexico) Juan Sosa
- (Mexico) Luis Villegas
- (Peru) Angelov Contreras
- (Peru) Daniel Rehder
- (Trinidad and Tobago) Joel Daniel
- (Trinidad and Tobago) Shawn Phillip
- (United States) Christian De Angelis
- (United States) Patrick Harris
- (United States) Jack Heldens
- (United States) Marius Leser
- (United States) Finlay Quaile

Source: FIH
