= 2013 Men's Pan American Cup =

International field hockey competition

- Official logo of the competition.

Tournament details
- Host country: Canada
- City: Brampton
- Dates: 10–17 August
- Teams: 8 (from 1 confederation)
- Venue: Cassie Campbell Community Centre

Final positions
- Champions: Argentina (2nd title)
- Runner-up: Canada
- Third place: Trinidad and Tobago

Tournament statistics
- Matches played: 20
- Goals scored: 151 (7.55 per match)
- Top scorer: (Argentina) Facundo Callioni (10 goals)
- Best player: (Trinidad and Tobago) Kwan Browne

The 2013 Men's Pan American Cup was the fourth edition of the Men's Pan American Cup, the quadrennial men's international field hockey championship of the Americas organized by the Pan American Hockey Federation. It was held between 10 and 17 August 2013 in Brampton, Canada.

The tournament doubled as the qualifier for two major international tournaments: the winner qualified directly to the 2014 World Cup, and the three teams not qualifying through the 2014 South American Games or the 2014 Central American and Caribbean Games qualified for the 2015 Pan American Games to be held in Toronto, Canada. Also, the top 6 teams qualified for the next Pan American Cup, while the bottom two will need to compete in the Pan American Challenge.

Argentina won the tournament for the second time after defeating Canada 4–0 in the final. As they had already secured an automatic berth at the 2014 World Cup thanks to a second-place finish at the World League Semifinal in Johor Bahru, Malaysia, their quota was immediately awarded to first reserve team Korea.

== Qualification ==
In early 2011 the Pan American Hockey Federation (PAHF) announced a new qualification system for the Men's Pan American Cups, recognizing the differences in team strength of the top playing nations and the remaining associations. The top six nations at the 2009 Pan American Cup now will qualify directly with the remaining two spots being taken at the newly created Pan American Challenge, which was held in 2011 in Rio de Janeiro, Brazil.

Dates	Event	Location	Quotas	Qualifiers
7–15 March 2009	2009 Pan American Cup	Santiago, Chile	6	Argentina; Canada; Chile; Mexico; Trinidad and Tobago; United States
31 July–7 August 2011	2011 Pan American Challenge	Rio de Janeiro, Brazil	2	Brazil; Uruguay
Total			8	

== Umpires ==
Below are the 11 umpires appointed by the Pan American Hockey Federation:

- Daniel Basto Rivero (MEX)
- Sebastián Bustamante (CHI)
- Gavin Caldecott (CAN)
- Nku Davis (TRI)
- Federico García (URU)
- Duvaughn Henlon (JAM)
- Grant Hundley (USA)
- Ilanggo Kanabathu (MAS)
- Andrés Ledesma (ARG)
- Raghu Prasad (IND)
- Donovan Simmons (BER)

== Results ==
All times are Eastern Daylight Time (UTC−04:00)

Pools were based on FIH Men's Outdoor Rankings as of 13 August 2012.

=== First round ===
Uruguay and Trinidad and Tobago faced traveling hurdles that required to alter the competition schedule. Both teams' opening matches were moved to Monday 12 August, while the remainder of the schedule was moved down a day.

==== Pool A ====
Pos	Team	Pld	W	D	L	GF	GA	GD	Pts	Qualification
1	Argentina	3	3	0	0	50	2	+48	9	Semi-finals
2	United States	3	2	0	1	15	10	+5	6	Semi-finals
3	Mexico	3	1	0	2	6	17	−11	3	5–8th place semi-finals
4	Uruguay	3	0	0	3	1	43	−42	0	5–8th place semi-finals

Source: FIH

10 August 2013
09:00

Argentina	13–2	Mexico
Paredes 1', 33'; Callioni 3', 4', 4', 56'; Barreiros 21', 68'; Vila 22', 64'; Schickendantz 33'; 50'; Tolini 67'	Report	Vásquez García 52'; Bobadilla Rosales 59'

Umpires:
Ilanggo Kanabathu (MAS)
Gavin Caldecott (CAN)

11 August 2013
09:00

Mexico	2–1	Uruguay
Pedraza 56'; Valdez 62'	Report	Tixe 64'

Umpires:
Sebastián Bustamante (CHI)
Donovan Simmons (BER)

11 August 2013
11:00

United States	0–8	Argentina
	Report	Callioni 5'; Vila 9'; Schickendantz 17', 50'; Paredes 30'; López 42'; M. Rey 56'; Ibarra 65'

Umpires:
Raghu Prasad (IND)
Nku Davis (TRI)

12 August 2013
15:00

United States	12–0	Uruguay
Linney 3', 4', 18', 36', 40'; Barber 24', 27'; Harris 37', 47', 59', 63'; Singh 43'	Report

Umpires:
Nku Davis (TRI)
Duvaughn Henlon (JAM)

14 August 2013
11:00

Mexico	2–3	United States
Aguilar 17', 39'	Report	Harris 33', 58', 70'

Umpires:
Sebastian Bustamente (CHI)
Gavin Caldecott (CAN)

14 August 2013
17:00

Argentina	29–0	Uruguay
Callioni 2', 20', 57', 58', 70'; Peillat 6'; Mazzilli 7', 18', 66', 70'; Barreiros 13', 48', 51', 63'; Schickendantz 16', 35+', 61', 68'; Vila 17', 28', 41', 44', 51'; Ibarra 25', 46'; Agulleiro 29'; L. Rey 33'; López 42'; Paredes 45'	Report

Umpires:
Ilanggo Kanabathu (MAS)
Daniel Basto Rivero (MEX)

==== Pool B ====
Pos	Team	Pld	W	D	L	GF	GA	GD	Pts	Qualification
1	Canada (H)	3	2	1	0	8	4	+4	7	Semi-finals
2	Trinidad and Tobago	3	2	0	1	11	6	+5	6	Semi-finals
3	Chile	3	1	1	1	8	7	+1	4	5–8th place semi-finals
4	Brazil	3	0	0	3	3	13	−10	0	5–8th place semi-finals

Source: FIH
(H) Hosts

10 August 2013
17:00

Canada	3–1	Brazil
Jameson 30'; Guest 49'; Pereira 55'	Report	Borges 43'

Umpires:
Federico García (URU)
Andrés Ledesma (ARG)

11 August 2013
15:00

Brazil	2–5	Trinidad and Tobago
Paes 45'; Vehrle-Smith 70+'	Report	Quan Chan 3'; Browne 29'; Legerton 54'; Murray 59'; Gilkes 66'

Umpires:
Daniel Basto Rivero (MEX)
Duvaughn Henlon (JAM)

11 August 2013
17:00

Chile	2–2	Canada
Richter 54'; Zirpel 56'	Report	Guest 21'; Sarmento 27'

Umpires:
Ilanggo Kanabathu (MAS)
Grant Hundley (USA)

12 August 2013
17:00

Chile	1–5	Trinidad and Tobago
J. Berczely 59'	Report	Toussaint 12', 28'; Pierre 14'; Quan Chan 43'; Legerton 47'

Umpires:
Raghu Prasad (IND)
Federico Garcia (URU)

14 August 2013
09:00

Brazil	0–5	Chile
	Report	Rodríguez 18'; Eggers 41'; A. Berczely 44'; J. Zarhi 50'; Krussig 53'

Umpires:
Grant Hundley (USA)
Donovan Simmons (BER)

14 August 2013
19:00

Canada	3–1	Trinidad and Tobago
Smythe 21'; Tupper 33'; Sarmento 34'	Report	7'

Umpires:
Raghu Prasad (IND)
Andres Ledesma (ARG)

=== Fifth to eighth place classification ===
5–8th place semi-finals
15 August
Chile	14
Uruguay	0
15 August
Mexico	3
Brazil	2

Fifth place
17 August
Chile	6
Mexico	3
Seventh place
17 August
Uruguay	2 (0)
Brazil (p.s.o.)	2 (2)

==== 5–8th place semi-finals ====
15 August 2013
09:00

Mexico	3–2	Brazil
Aguilar 46', 64', 67'	Report	Borges 20', 28'

Umpires:
Nku Davis (TRI)
Donovan Simmons (BER)

15 August 2013
11:30

Chile	14–0	Uruguay
Rodríguez 6', 33', 46'; Martín 19', 37', 50'; Zarhi 20'; Berczely 28', 61'; Renz 42'; Valenzuela 50'; Richter 56'; Krussig 65', 70'	Report

Umpires:
Daniel Basto Rivero (MEX)
Andrés Ledesma (ARG)

==== Seventh place game ====
17 August 2013
09:00

Uruguay	2–2	Brazil
Tixe 18'; Canessa 65'	Report	Paixão 7'; Rost Onnes 52'
Penalties
Laborde (penalty shoot-out missed); Canessa (penalty shoot-out missed); Colina (penalty shoot-out missed); Tixe (penalty shoot-out missed)	0–2	(penalty shoot-out missed) van der Heijden; (penalty shoot-out scored) Borges; (penalty shoot-out scored) Reus

Umpires:
Gavin Caldecott (CAN)
Duvaughn Henlon (JAM)

==== Fifth place game ====
17 August 2013
11:30

Chile	6–3	Mexico
Rodríguez 15', 18'; Martín 41'; Fernández 47'; Zarhi 62'; Berczely 70'	Report	Pedraza 10'; Aguilar 34', 54'

Umpires:
Nku Davis (TRI)
Federico García (URU)

=== First to fourth place classification ===
Semi-finals
15 August
Argentina	8
Trinidad and Tobago	0
15 August
Canada	1
United States	0

Final
17 August
Argentina	4
Canada	0
Third place
17 August
Trinidad and Tobago	3
United States	1

==== Semi-finals ====
15 August 2013
17:00

Argentina	8–0	Trinidad and Tobago
Peillat 29', 34', 63'; L. Rey 39'; Vila 45'; Schickendantz 52'; Agulleiro 52'; Tolini 55'	Report

Umpires:
Grant Hundley (USA)
Gavin Caldecott (CAN)

15 August 2013
19:30

Canada	1–0	United States
Panesar 10'	Report

Umpires:
Federico García (URU)
Sebastián Bustamante (CHI)

==== Third place game ====
17 August 2013
16:30

Trinidad and Tobago	3–1	United States
Legerton 22'; Pierre 43'; Browne 61'	Report	Käppeler 12'

Umpires:
Andrés Ledesma (ARG)
Ilanggo Kanabathu (MAS)

==== Final ====
17 August 2013
19:00

Argentina	4–0	Canada
Peillat 38', 41', 48', 57'	Report

Umpires:
Raghu Prasad (IND)
Grant Hundley (USA)

== Statistics ==
=== Final standings ===
Rank	Team
1st place, gold medalist(s)	Argentina
2nd place, silver medalist(s)	Canada
3rd place, bronze medalist(s)	Trinidad and Tobago
4	United States
5	Chile
6	Mexico
7	Brazil
8	Uruguay

=== Awards ===
Top Goalscorer	Player of the Tournament	Goalkeeper of the Tournament
(Argentina) Facundo Callioni	(Trinidad and Tobago) Kwan Browne	(Brazil) Hubertus Reinbach

== See also ==
- 2013 Women's Pan American Cup
