= Uruguay men's national field hockey team =

Uruguay
- Association: Uruguayan Field Hockey Federation (Federacion Uruguaya de Hockey sobre Cesped)
- Confederation: PAHF (Americas)

FIH ranking
- Current: 51 ▲5 (4 October 2026)
- Highest: 40 (2006)
- Lowest: 64 (2003)

Pan American Cup
- Appearances: 4 (first in 2004)
- Best result: 7th (2025)
Medal record
South American Championship
Bronze medal – third place	2008 Montevideo
Bronze medal – third place	2010 Rio de Janeiro
Bronze medal – third place	2016 Chiclayo

The Uruguay men's national field hockey team represents Uruguay in men's international field hockey competitions. It is controlled by the Uruguayan Field Hockey Federation.

Uruguay won their first medal at the South American Games by winning bronze at the 2026 ODESUR.

== Tournament record ==
=== Pan American Cup ===
- 2004 – 9th place
- 2009 – 8th place
- 2013 – 8th place
- 2025 – 7th place

=== South American Games ===
- 2006 – 4th place
- 2014 – 5th place
- 2018 – 6th place
- 2022 – 5th place
- 2026 – (bronze)

=== South American Championship ===
- 2003 – 4th place
- 2008 – (bronze)
- 2010 – (bronze)
- 2013 – 5th place
- 2016 – (bronze)

=== Pan American Challenge ===
- 2011 – (gold)
- 2015 – (bronze)

=== Hockey World League ===
- 2016–17 – Round 1

=== FIH Hockey Series ===
- 2018–19 – First round

== Current squad ==
This is the list of players announced for the ODESUR 2026.

Head coach: Gonzalo Ferrer

2. Francisco García Genta
4. Ignacio Machado
5. Federico Galindo
7. Lucas Cantaro
8. Gonzalo Martinoni
9. Tomas Lopez
10. Joaquin Rodriguez (C)
11. Marcello Diconca
12. Juan Casal
13. May Moria
14. Matias Pereiro
18. Jenaro Bentancur
19. Ezequiel Bauza
22. Diego Laborde (C)
24. Mateo Pereiro
28. Rodrigo Castro (GK)

== Results and fixtures ==
The following is a list of match results in the last 12 months, as well as any future matches that have been scheduled.

Win Draw Loss Fixture

=== 2026 ===
13 September 2026 2026 ODESUR Pool A	Brazil	3–2	Uruguay	Santa Fe, Argentina
15:00	Patrocínio 8'; Smith 9'; Lopez 56'	Report	Moria 44'; Pereiro 56'	Stadium: Estadio Asociacion Santafesina de Hockey

15 September 2026 2026 ODESUR Pool A	Chile	6–0	Uruguay	Santa Fe, Argentina
12:00	Contardo 12', 24'; Strabucchi 33', 44'; Stein 52'; Acevedo 54'	Report		Stadium: Estadio Asociacion Santafesina de Hockey

16 September 2026 2026 ODESUR Pool A	Uruguay	2–1	Peru	Santa Fe, Argentina
14:00	Cantaro 12'; Pereiro 22'	Report	Curo 14'	Stadium: Estadio Asociacion Santafesina de Hockey

20 September 2026 2026 ODESUR Pool A	Argentina	7–0	Uruguay	Santa Fe, Argentina
12:00	Rodriguez 7'; Serrano 13'; Costa 19', 40'; Torrigiani 46'; Dulor 53'; Cicileo 57'	Report		Stadium: Estadio Asociacion Santafesina de Hockey

22 September 2026 2026 ODESUR Bronze medal match	Brazil	1–1 (2–3 p)	Uruguay	Santa Fe, Argentina
09:00	Patrocínio 40'	Report	Galindo 59'	Stadium: Estadio Asociacion Santafesina de Hockey
	Penalties
	Heijden (penalty shoot-out missed); J. Lopez (penalty shoot-out missed); Patrocínio (penalty shoot-out missed); Imer (penalty shoot-out scored); Smith (penalty shoot-out scored)		(penalty shoot-out missed) Cantaro; (penalty shoot-out missed) Moria; (penalty shoot-out scored) T. Lopez; (penalty shoot-out scored) Martinoni; (penalty shoot-out scored) Pereiro

== See also ==
- Uruguay women's national field hockey team
