= 2011 Men's Pan American Challenge =

International field hockey competition

Tournament details
- Host country: Brazil
- City: Rio de Janeiro
- Dates: 31 July – 7 August 2011
- Teams: 3 (from 1 confederation)
- Venue: Deodoro Stadium

Final positions
- Champions: Uruguay (1st title)
- Runner-up: Brazil
- Third place: Paraguay

Tournament statistics
- Matches played: 6
- Goals scored: 38 (6.33 per match)
- Top scorer: (Brazil) Augusto de Paula Felipe (5 goals)
- Best player: (Brazil) Augusto de Paula Felipe
- Best goalkeeper: (Brazil) Daniel Tatara

The 2011 Men's Pan American Challenge was the first edition of the Men's Pan American Challenge. It was held between 31 July and 7 August 2011 in Rio de Janeiro, Brazil, simultaneously with the women's tournament.

Three teams competed in a double round-robin tournament. Uruguay won the tournament for the first time, finishing top of the pool above Brazil and Paraguay who won silver and bronze respectively.

== Participating nations ==
A total of three teams competed for the title:

- Brazil (host nation)
- Paraguay
- Uruguay

== Results ==
=== Pool ===
Pos	Team	Pld	W	D	L	GF	GA	GD	Pts
1st place, gold medalist(s)	Uruguay	4	3	1	0	19	2	+17	10
2nd place, silver medalist(s)	Brazil	4	2	1	1	18	3	+15	7
3rd place, bronze medalist(s)	Paraguay	4	0	0	4	1	33	−32	0

Source: Panamhockey

31 July 2011
14:45

Brazil	6–0	Paraguay
da Veiga Pacheco 16', 44'; Sousa 19'; Borges Ferreira 31'; P. van der Heijden 48' de Paulo Felipe 56'	Report

Umpires:
German Montes de Oca (ARG)
Donovan Simmons (BER)

1 August 2011
14:45

Uruguay	0–0	Brazil
	Report

Umpires:
German Montes de Oca (ARG)
Lance Sarabia (USA)

3 August 2011
14:30

Paraguay	0–10	Uruguay
	Report	Peri 5'; Matias Pereiro 9'; Mateo Pereiro 16', 32'; Castillo 30'; Costas 33'; Iglesias 43', 52'; M. Tixe 62'; P. Draper 69'

Umpires:
Donovan Simmons (BER)
Oliver Hock (BRA)

4 August 2011
14:30

Paraguay	0–11	Brazil
	Report	de Paulo Felipe 18', 33', 41', 59'; Y. van der Heijden 26', 53', 65', 67'; De Sousa 40'; Patrocínio Couto 61'; P. van der Heijden 63'

Umpires:
German Montes de Oca (ARG)
Lance Sarabia (USA)

6 August 2011
10:00

Uruguay	6–1	Paraguay
Canessa 7', 57', 70'; Mateo Pereiro 13'; Iglesias 17'; M. Tixe 46'	Report	Russo Pedro 2'

Umpires:
Lance Sarabia (USA)
Oliver Hock (BRA)

7 August 2011
10:00

Brazil	1–3	Uruguay
Borges Ferreira 48'	Report	Castillo 26'; Costas 47'; Canessa 69'

Umpires:
German Montes de Oca (ARG)
Donovan Simmons (BER)

== Final standings ==
1. Uruguay
2. Brazil
3. Paraguay
