= Lucas Martínez (field hockey) =

Argentine field hockey player

Personal information
- Full name: Lucas Martínez Ruiz
- Born: 17 November 1993 (age 32) Buenos Aires, Argentina
- Height: 1.74 m (5 ft 9 in)

Sport
- Sport: Field hockey
- Position: Forward
- Club: Dragons
Senior career
Years	Team	Caps	Goals
–2015	Mitre	-	-
2015–2016	Club de Campo	-	-
2016–2018	HGC	-	-
2018–2020	Oranje-Rood	-	-
2020–present	Dragons	-	-
National team
Years	Team	Caps	Goals
2012–2013	Argentina U21	17	-
2014–present	Argentina	106	(23)
Medal record
Men's field hockey
Representing Argentina
World Cup
Bronze medal – third place	2014 The Hague
Bronze medal – third place	2026 Wavre/Amstelveen
Pan American Games
Gold medal – first place	2019 Lima	Team
Gold medal – first place	2023 Santiago	Team
Pan American Cup
Gold medal – first place	2022 Santiago
Gold medal – first place	2025 Montevideo
South American Games
Gold medal – first place	2014 Santiago	Team
Pan American Junior Championship
Gold medal – first place	2012 Guadalajara
- Updated on 3 January 2022

Lucas Martínez Ruiz (born 17 November 1993) is an Argentine field hockey player who plays as a forward for Belgian club Dragons and the Argentine national team.

== Club career ==
Martínez played for Club Ferrocarril Mitre in Argentina before he moved to Europe to play for Club de Campo in Madrid, Spain. The forward scored eight goals in his first season in Europe. He left the Madrid-based club in 2016 to play for HGC in the Netherlands. After two seasons with HGC, he transferred to HC Oranje-Rood from Eindhoven to replace his fellow-countrymen Agustín Mazzilli. With Oranje-Rood he made his debut in the Euro Hockey League. It was announced in May 2020 that he would join Dragons in Belgium for the 2020–21 season.

== International career ==
Martínez played with the Argentina U21 squad at the 2012 Pan American Junior Championship, the 2013 Sultan of Johor Cup, and the 2013 Junior World Cup before he made his debut for the main squad in 2014 at the 2014 South American Games. He won the gold medal at that tournament and made four goals. He was also part of the Argentina squad which won the bronze medal at the 2014 World Cup, which was his first World Cup. In 2018 he was selected for the 2018 World Cup, where he scored two goals in four matches. In July 2019, he was selected in the Argentina squad for the 2019 Pan American Games. They won the gold medal by defeating Canada 5–2 in the final.
