= 2015 Men's Pan American Challenge =

International field hockey competition

Tournament details
- Host country: Peru
- City: Chiclayo
- Dates: 3–11 October
- Teams: 8
- Venue(s): San Jose National College

Final positions
- Champions: Brazil (1st title)
- Runner-up: Venezuela
- Third place: Uruguay

Tournament statistics
- Matches played: 20
- Goals scored: 162 (8.1 per match)
- Top scorer(s): (Venezuela) Cristian Vargas (11 goals)
- Best player: (Venezuela) José Oropeza

The 2015 Men's Pan American Challenge was the second edition of the Men's Pan American Challenge. It was held between 3 and 11 October 2015 in Chiclayo, Peru, simultaneously with the women's tournament.

Brazil won the tournament for the first time after defeating Venezuela 1–0 in the final. Uruguay won the bronze medal by defeating Guyana 3–2 in a penalty shoot-out following a 2–2 draw. The top two teams also qualified for the 2017 Pan American Cup.

== Participating nations ==
A total of eight teams competed for the title:

- Brazil
- Ecuador
- Guyana
- Panama
- Peru
- Puerto Rico
- Uruguay
- Venezuela

== Results ==
All times are local (UTC-5).

=== First round ===
==== Pool A ====
Pos	Team	Pld	W	D	L	GF	GA	GD	Pts	Qualification
1	Brazil	3	2	1	0	25	3	+22	7	Semi-finals
2	Guyana	3	1	2	0	18	4	+14	5	Semi-finals
3	Puerto Rico	3	1	1	1	15	7	+8	4	
4	Panama	3	0	0	3	0	44	−44	0	

Source: FIH
Rules for classification: 1) points; 2) goal difference; 3) goals scored; 4) head-to-head result.

3 October 2015
09:00

Brazil	18–0	Panama
Mendonça 1', 8', 34'; Y. van der Heijden 2', 51'; Paixão 4'; Pasin 9', 42'; Borges 17', 36', 45+', 48'; Batista 21'; Bitencourt 24', 43'; Smith 25'; Reus 52'; Sousa 58'	Report

Umpires:
(Argentina) Maximiliano Scala
(Guyana) Devin Hooper

3 October 2015
11:00

Puerto Rico	2–2	Guyana
Agosto 12'; Monserrate 23'	Report	Branford 35', 40'

Umpires:
(Argentina) Gabriel Labate
(Venezuela) Manuel Sierra Centeno

5 October 2015
09:00

Panama	0–14	Guyana
	Report	Samuels 1'; Branford 4', 35', 51', 60'; Sargeant 13', 43'; Assanah 20', 51'; France 32', 38'; Semple 36', 49'; Xavier 40'

Umpires:
(Ecuador) Granda Roger
(Venezuela) Manuel Sierra Centeno

5 October 2015
11:00

Puerto Rico	1–5	Brazil
Torres Grilo 18'	Report	Smith 6', 9'; Paixão 15'; P. van der Heijden 33'; Y. van der Heijden 45'

Umpires:
(Panama) Marcial Nuñez
(Guyana) Devin Hooper

6 October 2015
12:00

Brazil	2–2	Guyana
Smith 42'; Paixão 43'	Report	Branford 12', 51'

Umpires:
(Argentina) Gabriel Labate
(Paraguay) Hugo Romero Chamorro

6 October 2015
14:00

Panama	0–12	Puerto Rico
	Report	Monserrate 2', 21', 23', 42', 54'; Feliciano 15'; Colon 17', 21', 45', 56'; Rodriguez 31'; Agosto 39'

Umpires:
(Peru) Rodrigo Rivadeneira
(Ecuador) Roger Granda

==== Pool B ====
Pos	Team	Pld	W	D	L	GF	GA	GD	Pts	Qualification
1	Venezuela	3	3	0	0	28	1	+27	9	Semi-finals
2	Uruguay	3	1	1	1	25	7	+18	4	Semi-finals
3	Peru (H)	3	1	1	1	15	8	+7	4	
4	Ecuador	3	0	0	3	1	53	−52	0	

Source: FIH
Rules for classification: 1) points; 2) goal difference; 3) goals scored; 4) head-to-head result.
(H) Hosts

4 October 2015
09:00

Uruguay	3-3	Peru
Laborde 30+'; Canessa 52'; A. Lopez 53'	Report	Diaz Espinosa 5', 51'; Rivera 39'

Umpires:
(Barbados) Shane Lewis
(Paraguay) Hugo Romero Chamorro

4 October 2015
11:00

Venezuela	20-0	Ecuador
Vargas 9', 18', 22', 33', 38', 39', 43', 48'; Laya 13', 14', 19'; Bracamonte 17', 22'; Rojas 24', 38'; Ochoa 43'; Simanca 44'; Adrian 49', 58'; Ramos 60'	Report

Umpires:
(Peru) Rodrigo Rivadeneira
(Puerto Rico) Vladimir Llopiz Crespo

6 October 2015
08:00

Peru	11-0	Ecuador
Corno 4', 12', 21', 24', 29'; Dennison 12'; Piazza 14'; Diaz Espinosa 31'; Rangel 36' de Martis 41'; Vera 50'	Report

Umpires:
(Barbados) Shane Lewis
(Puerto Rico) Vladimir Llopiz Crespo

6 October 2015
10:00

Venezuela	3-0	Uruguay
Vargas 2'; Adrian 7'; Escobar 54'	Report

Umpires:
(Argentina) Maximilliano Scala
(Panama) Marcial Nuñez

7 October 2015
09:00

Uruguay	22-1	Ecuador
Costas 5', 13', 15', 33', 51'; Iglesias 6', 35', 53'; Vasquez 9'; Rivero 12', 55'; Canessa 15'; G. Lopez 18', 24'; A. Lopez 20', 29', 53'; Cantaro 26', 52', 57'; Rodriguez 38'; Romano 49'	Report	Soria 2'

Umpires:
(Peru) Rodrigo Rivadeneira
(Puerto Rico) Vladimir Llopiz Crespo

7 October 2015
11:00

Peru	1-5	Venezuela
Castro 1'; Adrian 29', 36', 60'; Vargas 52'	Report	Lopez 14'

Umpires:
(Argentina) Maximilliano Scala
(Argentina) Gabriel Labate

=== Second round ===
==== Fifth to eighth place classification ====
Crossover
9 October 2015
Puerto Rico	8
Ecuador	1
9 October 2015
Peru	6
Panama	0

Fifth place
10 October 2015
Puerto Rico	1 (1)
Peru (p.s.o.)	1 (2)
Seventh place
10 October 2015
Ecuador	1
Panama	2

===== Crossover =====
9 October 2015
08:30

Puerto Rico	8-1	Ecuador
Agosto 8'; Motta 13', 54'; Colon 38', 59'; Monserrate 46'; Feliciano 49'; Rivera 58'	Report	Lopez 52'

Umpires:
(Barbados) Shane Lewis
(Panama) Marcial Nuñez

9 October 2015
15:15

Peru	6-0	Panama
Rivera 4', 41', 56'; Morales 23'; Corno 38'; Dennison 48'	Report

Umpires:
(Guyana) Devin Hooper
(Venezuela) Manuel Sierra Centeno

===== Seventh and eighth place =====
10 October 2015
13:30

Ecuador	1-2	Panama
Vasquez 9'	Report	Correa 21'; Boodie 34'

Umpires:
(Venezuela) Manuel Sierra Centeno
(Peru) Rodrigo Rivadeneira

===== Fifth and sixth place =====
10 October 2015
15:45

Puerto Rico	1-1	Peru
Feliciano 27'	Report	Dennison 20'
Penalties
J. Rodriguez (penalty shoot-out missed); K. Rodriguez (penalty shoot-out scored); Feliciano (penalty shoot-out missed); Motta (penalty shoot-out missed); Colon (penalty shoot-out missed)	1-2	(penalty shoot-out scored) Dennison; (penalty shoot-out missed) Rivera; (penalty shoot-out scored) Corno; (penalty shoot-out missed) de Martis

Umpires:
(Panama) Marcial Nuñez
(Guyana) Devin Hooper

==== First to fourth place classification ====
Semi-finals
9 October 2015
Brazil	4
Uruguay	0
9 October 2015
Venezuela (p.s.o.)	3 (5)
Guyana	3 (4)

Final
11 October 2015
Brazil	1
Venezuela	0
Third place
11 October 2015
Uruguay (p.s.o.)	2 (3)
Guyana	2 (2)

===== Semi-finals =====
9 October 2015
10:45

Brazil	4–0	Uruguay
Paixão 27'; Borges 21', 56'; Patrocínio 50'	Report

Umpires:
(Argentina) Maximilliano Scala
(Peru) Rodrigo Rivadeneira

9 October 2015
13:00

Venezuela	3–3	Guyana
Adrian 2'; Vargas 21'; Simanca 54'	Report	France 9', 31'; Branford 35'
Penalties
Vargas (penalty shoot-out missed); Adrian (penalty shoot-out missed); Bracamonte (penalty shoot-out scored); Oropeza (penalty shoot-out scored); Abreu (penalty shoot-out scored); Vargas (penalty shoot-out scored); Oropeza (penalty shoot-out scored)	5–4	(penalty shoot-out scored) Branford; (penalty shoot-out scored) Assanah; (penalty shoot-out missed) McKenzie; (penalty shoot-out missed) Semple; (penalty shoot-out scored) Dannett; (penalty shoot-out scored) Branford; (penalty shoot-out missed) Assanah

Umpires:
(Argentina) Gabriel Labate
(Paraguay) Hugo Romero Chamorro

===== Third and fourth place =====
11 October 2015
09:00

Uruguay	2–2	Guyana
Canessa 22'; Rodríguez 23'	Report	Dannett 5'; France 40'
Penalties
Canessa (penalty shoot-out missed); Martinoni (penalty shoot-out missed); Laborde (penalty shoot-out scored); A. Lopez (penalty shoot-out scored); Costas (penalty shoot-out scored)	3–2	(penalty shoot-out scored) Branford; (penalty shoot-out missed) France; (penalty shoot-out scored) Dannett; (penalty shoot-out missed) Assanah; (penalty shoot-out missed) Stewart

Umpires:
(Barbados) Shane Lewis
(Paraguay) Hugo Romero Chamorro

===== Final =====
11 October 2015
15:45

Brazil	1–0	Venezuela
Borges 15'	Report

Umpires:
(Argentina) Maximilliano Scala
(Argentina) Gabriel Labate

== Final standings ==
Rank	Team
Gold medal	Brazil
Silver medal	Venezuela
Bronze medal	Uruguay
4	Guyana
5	Peru
6	Puerto Rico
7	Panama
8	Ecuador

== See also ==
- 2015 Women's Pan American Challenge
