= Pedro Ibarra =

Argentine field hockey player

Personal information
- Born: 11 September 1985 (age 40) San Fernando, Buenos Aires
- Height: 1.76 m (5 ft 9 in)
- Weight: 79 kg (174 lb)

Sport
- Sport: Field hockey
- Position: Defender
National team
Years	Team	Caps	Goals
2004–2021	Argentina	316	(6)
Medal record
Olympic Games
Gold medal – first place	2016 Rio de Janeiro	Team
World Cup
Bronze medal – third place	2014 The Hague
Pan American Games
Gold medal – first place	2011 Guadalajara	Team
Gold medal – first place	2015 Toronto	Team
Gold medal – first place	2019 Lima	Team
Silver medal – second place	2007 Rio de Janeiro	Team
Pan American Cup
Gold medal – first place	2013 Brampton
Gold medal – first place	2017 Lancaster
South American Games
Gold medal – first place	2014 Santiago	Team
Junior World Cup
Gold medal – first place	2005 Rotterdam

Pedro Ibarra (born 11 September 1985) is an Argentine former field hockey player who played as a defender. He represented the Argentine national team from 2004 to 2021.

== Career ==
He made his debut for the national squad in 2004, after having played the Junior World Cup in Rotterdam, Netherlands. He finished in tenth place with his national team at the 2006 Men's Hockey World Cup in Mönchengladbach, and in tenth at the 2012 Summer Olympics. Pedro won the bronze medal at the 2014 Men's Hockey World Cup and three gold medals at the Pan American Games. He played in Spain for Real Club de Polo de Barcelona. In July 2019, he was selected in the Argentina squad for the 2019 Pan American Games. They won the gold medal by defeating Canada 5–2 in the final. He retired after the 2020 Summer Olympics having played for 17 years for the national team.
