= Nicolás Keenan =

Argentine field hockey player (born 1997)

Personal information
- Full name: Nicolás Santiago Keenan
- Born: 6 May 1997 (age 29) Buenos Aires, Argentina
- Height: 1.84 m (6 ft 0 in)
- Weight: 76 kg (168 lb)

Sport
- Sport: Field hockey
- Position: Midfielder / Forward
- Club: Klein Zwitserland
Youth career
- Years: Team
- 2009–2015: Club Egara
Senior career
Years	Team	Caps	Goals
2017–present	Klein Zwitserland	-	-
National team
Years	Team	Caps	Goals
2015–2016	Argentina U21	17	(7)
2019–present	Argentina	82	(21)
Medal record
Men's field hockey
Representing Argentina
World Cup
Bronze medal – third place	2026 Wavre/Amstelveen
Pan American Games
Gold medal – first place	2019 Lima	Team
Gold medal – first place	2023 Santiago	Team
Pan American Cup
Gold medal – first place	2025 Montevideo
Pan American Junior Championship
Gold medal – first place	2016 Toronto
- Updated on 22 August 2024

Nicolás Santiago Keenan (born 6 May 1997) is an Argentine field hockey player who plays as a midfielder or forward for Dutch Hoofdklasse club Klein Zwitserland and the Argentina national team.

== Early life ==
Keenan was born in Buenos Aires, Argentina, and grew up in Spain and Italy. He is of Irish descent through his paternal grandfather.

== Career ==
=== Club career ===
Keenan played for Club Egara in Spain from age 12 till he was 18. After the 2016 Junior World Cup in Lucknow, he moved to The Hague, Netherlands to play for HC Klein Zwitserland.

=== International career ===
Keenan had the opportunity to represent Spain as a junior, but he chose to play internationally for Argentina. He made his debut for the senior national team in the 2019 FIH Pro League. In July 2019, he was selected in the Argentina squad for the 2019 Pan American Games. They won the gold medal by defeating Canada 5–2 in the final. On 25 June 2021, he was chosen to represent Argentina at the 2020 Summer Olympics. He made his World Cup debut at the 2023 Men's FIH Hockey World Cup. He appeared again at the 2024 Summer Olympics in Paris, initially as a reserve but later called up into the Argentinian squad which reached the quarter-finals.

== Personal life ==
Keenan is bisexual and has been in a relationship with Dutch politician Rob Jetten since 2022. They announced their engagement in November 2024. Jetten became prime minister of the Netherlands in February 2026. In October 2026, Keenan and Jetten announced they were expecting a child born via surrogacy.

== Honours ==
=== Club ===
Klein Zwitserland

- Gold Cup: 2021–22

=== International ===
Argentina U21

- Pan American Junior Championship: 2016

Argentina

- Pan American Games gold medal: 2019, 2023

== International goals ==
No.	Date	Venue	Opponent	Score	Result	Competition
1.	3 August 2019	Lima, Peru	Cuba	7–0	9–0	2019 Pan American Games
2.	25 July 2021	Tokyo, Japan	Japan	2–1	2–1	2020 Summer Olympics
3.	30 July 2021	Tokyo, Japan	New Zealand	4–1	4–1	2020 Summer Olympics
4.	19 March 2022	Bhubaneswar, India	India	2–1	2–2 (3–1 p)	2021–22 Men's FIH Pro League
5.	21 May 2022	Berlin, Germany	Germany	1–0	3–5	2021–22 Men's FIH Pro League
6.	20 January 2023	Rourkela, India	France	1–0	5–5	2023 Men's FIH Hockey World Cup
7.	23 January 2023	Bhubaneswar, India	South Korea	2–1	5–5 (2–3 p)	2023 Men's FIH Hockey World Cup
8.	23 January 2023	Bhubaneswar, India	South Korea	5–3	5–5 (2–3 p)	2023 Men's FIH Hockey World Cup
9.	26 January 2023	Rourkela, India	Chile	6–0	8–0	2023 Men's FIH Hockey World Cup
10.	25 October 2023	Santiago, Chile	Mexico	6–1	10–1	2023 Pan American Games
11.	29 October 2023	Santiago, Chile	Peru	3–0	22–0	2023 Pan American Games
12.	29 October 2023	Santiago, Chile	Peru	9–0	22–0	2023 Pan American Games
13.	29 October 2023	Santiago, Chile	Peru	13–0	22–0	2023 Pan American Games
14.	14 February 2024	Santiago del Estero, Argentina	Belgium	1–0	4–1	2023–24 Men's FIH Pro League
15.	14 February 2024	Santiago del Estero, Argentina	Belgium	4–1	4–1	2023–24 Men's FIH Pro League
16.	25 May 2024	Antwerp, Belgium	Ireland	3–2	4–3	2023–24 Men's FIH Pro League
17.	26 May 2024	Antwerp, Belgium	India	2–1	4–5	2023–24 Men's FIH Pro League
18.	15 June 2025	Amsterdam, Netherlands	Netherlands	1–1	1–1	2024–25 Men's FIH Pro League
19.	22 June 2025	Berlin, Germany	Germany	1–0	3–4	2024–25 Men's FIH Pro League
20.	1 August 2025	Montevideo, Uruguay	Canada	4–1	9–1	2025 Men's Pan American Cup
