= Field hockey at the 2014 South American Games =

- Venue: Club Deportivo Manquehue
- Location: Santiago, Chile
- Dates: 8–16 March
- Nations: 7
- Teams: 12

The men's and women's field hockey competitions at the 2014 South American Games were the second inclusion of hockey at the South American Games. Both tournaments were held in conjunction with one another between 8 and 16 March 2014 at Club Deportivo Manquehue in Santiago, Chile.

In the men's tournament, Argentina won the gold medal for the second time by defeating Chile 8–1 in the final. Venezuela won the bronze medal by defeating Brazil 3–2 in the bronze-medal match.

In the women's tournament, Argentina won the gold medal for the second time by defeating Chile 3–1 in the final. Uruguay won the bronze medal by defeating Brazil 3–0 in the bronze-medal match.

The top two teams in the men's tournament, Argentina and Chile, and the top two teams in the women's tournament, Argentina and Chile all qualified to compete at the 2015 Pan American Games in Toronto, Ontario, Canada.

== Participating nations ==
=== Men's tournament ===
- Argentina
- Brazil
- Chile
- Peru
- Uruguay
- Venezuela

=== Women's tournament ===
- Argentina
- Brazil
- Chile
- Paraguay
- Uruguay
- Venezuela

== Medal summary ==
Event	Gold	Silver	Bronze
Men	Argentina	Chile	Venezuela
Women	Argentina	Chile	Uruguay

=== Medal table ===
* Host nation (Chile)

Rank	Nation	Gold	Silver	Bronze	Total
1	Argentina (ARG)	2	0	0	2
2	Chile (CHI)*	0	2	0	2
3	Uruguay (URU)	0	0	1	1
3	Venezuela (VEN)	0	0	1	1
Totals (4 entries)		2	2	2	6

== Men's tournament ==
Men's field hockey at the 2014 South American Games
Tournament details
- Host country: Chile
- City: Santiago
- Dates: 8–16 March
- Teams: 6 (from 1 confederation)
- Venue(s): Club Deportivo Manquehue

Final positions
- Champions: Argentina (2nd title)
- Runner-up: Chile
- Third place: Venezuela

Tournament statistics
- Matches played: 18
- Goals scored: 144 (8 per match)
- Top scorer(s): (Argentina) Gonzalo Peillat (16 goals)

=== Round robin ===
Pos	Team	Pld	W	D	L	GF	GA	GD	Pts	Qualification
1	Argentina	5	5	0	0	58	7	+51	15	Final
2	Chile (H)	5	4	0	1	20	8	+12	12	Final
3	Brazil	5	3	0	2	16	12	+4	9	Third place game
4	Venezuela	5	2	0	3	20	17	+3	6	Third place game
5	Uruguay	5	1	0	4	10	19	−9	3	Fifth-place game
6	Peru	5	0	0	5	1	62	−61	0	Fifth-place game

Source: PanAmHockey
Rules for classification: 1) points; 2) goal difference; 3) goals scored; 4) head-to-head result.
(H) Hosts

8 March 2014
14:00

Argentina	27–0	Peru
Barreiros 11', 48'; Peillat 13', 23', 39', 45', 53', 64', 70+'; Schickendantz 15', 32', 34', 56', 67', 69'; Andino 18', 58'; Ortiz 19'; Gilardi 31', 34'; Menini 32', 42', 57', 60'; Mazzilli 40'; Agulleiro 47'; Martinez 68'	Report

Umpires:
Federico Garcia (URU)
Matias Barbosa (CHL)

8 March 2014
16:00

Brazil	2–1	Uruguay
Paixão 24'; Patrocínio 28'	Report	A. Lopez 29'

Umpires:
Gus Soteriades (USA)
Sebastian Bustamante (CHL)

8 March 2014
18:00

Chile	2–0	Venezuela
Eggers 15', 54'	Report

Umpires:
Arturo Vazquez Serrano (MEX)
Oliver Höck (BRA)

9 March 2014
14:00

Peru	1–8	Brazil
Banda Ramos 4'	Report	Borges 9'; Smith 15', 42', 58'; Rost-Onnes 28', 55'; Rickenbach 34'; Paixão 61'

Umpires:
Manuel Sierra Senteno (VEN)
Arturo Vazquez Serrano (MEX)

9 March 2014
16:00

Argentina	10–3	Venezuela
Peillat 11', 25'; Martinez 13'; Ibarra 33'; Menini 36'; Schickendantz 43', 61', 68'; Gilardi 47', 51'	Report	Adrian Ferrera 4'; Malave Marquez 65'; Bracamonte Osorio 67'

Umpires:
Daniel Gonzalez Alvizuri (PER)
Federico Garcia (UR)

9 March 2014
18:00

Chile	2–0	Uruguay
Martín 48'; Renz 68'	Report

Umpires:
Maximiliano Scala (ARG)
Gus Soteriades (USA)

11 March 2014
14:00

Uruguay	1–7	Venezuela
Colina 49'	Report	Simanco Mendoza 3'; Bracamonte Osorio 8'; Vargas 17'; Adrian Ferrera 19', 45'; Laya Hernandez 42', 52'

Umpires:
Maximiliano Scala (ARG)
Arturo Vazquez Serrano (MEX)

11 March 2014
16:00

Brazil	1–6	Argentina
Paixão 57'	Report	Peillat 11', 17'; Mazzilli 21'; Andino 36'; Agulleiro 51'; Schickendantz 66'

Umpires:
Matias Barbosa (CHL)
Sebastian Bustamante (CHL)

11 March 2014
18:00

Peru	0–10	Chile
	Report	Martín 17', 34'; Zarhi 17', 19', 61'; Fernández 21'; Kapsch 29'; Rodríguez 35', 63'; Renz 57'

12 March 2014
14:00

Venezuela	1–4	Brazil
Adrian Ferrera 7'	Report	Smith 18', 60'; Borges 31'; Paes 70'

Umpires:
Maximiliano Scala (ARG)
Daniel Gonzalez Alvizuri (PER)

12 March 2014
16:00

Uruguay	8–0	Peru
Tixe 8'; Draper 16'; Pereiro 17'; Laborde 40'; Lopez 46', 50'; Canessa 54', 60'	Report

Umpires:
Sebastian Bustamante (CHL)
Matias Barbosa (CHL)

12 March 2014
18:00

Chile	3–7	Argentina
Martín 45', 47'; Rodríguez 70'	Report	Schickendantz 26'; Martinez 28'; Agulleiro 44', 62'; Peillat 54', 58'; Ibarra 69'

Umpires:
Gus Soteriades (USA)
Federico Garcia (URU)

14 March 2014
16:00

Venezuela	9–0	Peru
Vargas 4'; Adrian Ferrera 28', 30', 54', 64'; Oropeza Baez 41'; Castro Osorio 52'; Malarve Marquez 57', 70'	Report

Umpires:
Federico Garcia (URU)
Oliver Höck (BRA)

14 March 2014
18:00

Argentina	8–0	Uruguay
Andino 9'; Ortiz 20'; Barreiros 21', 48'; Schickendantz 27'; Menini 29'; Peillat 33'; Ibarra 57'	Report

Umpires:
Arturo Vazquez Serrano (MEX)
Manuel Sierra Centeno (VEN)

14 March 2014
20:00

Brazil	1–3	Chile
Mendonça 69'	Report	Maldonado 10'; Renz 39'; Rodríguez 61'

Umpires:
Gus Soteriades (USA)
Maximiliano Scala (ARG)

=== Classification round ===
==== Fifth and sixth place ====
16 March 2014
09:15

Uruguay	5 - 0	Peru
Canessa 4'; Lopez 17', 23', 28'; Tixe 41'	Report

Umpires:
Sebastian Bustamante (CHL)
Matias Barbosa (CHL)

==== Bronze-medal match ====
16 March 2014
16:00

Brazil	2 – 3	Venezuela
Smith 19'; Y. van der Heijden 37'	Report	Adrian Herrera 54', 70'; Vargas 59'

Umpires:
Arturo Vazquez Serrano (MEX)
Maximiliano Scala (ARG)

==== Gold-medal match ====
16 March 2014
20:30

Argentina	8 – 1	Chile
Ortiz 12', 53'; Peillat 33', 46'; Andino 38', 52'; Schickendantz 51'; Martinez 58'	Report	Martín 70'

Umpires:
Federico Garcia (URU)
Gus Soteriades (USA)

=== Final standings ===
Rank	Team
1st place, gold medalist(s)	Argentina
2nd place, silver medalist(s)	Chile
3rd place, bronze medalist(s)	Venezuela
4	Brazil
5	Uruguay
6	Peru

Qualified for the 2015 Pan American Games

=== Goalscorers ===
There were 144 goals scored in 18 matches, for an average of 8 goals per match.

16 goals

- (Argentina) Gonzalo Peillat

13 goals

- (Argentina) Guillermo Schickendantz

10 goals

- (Venezuela) Andy Adrian

6 goals

- (Argentina) Alan Andino
- (Argentina) Joaquín Menini
- (Brazil) Stephane Smith
- (Chile) Vicente Martín
- (Uruguay) Alexis López

4 goals

- (Argentina) Juan Agulleiro
- (Argentina) Guido Barreiros
- (Argentina) Juan Ignacio Gilardi
- (Argentina) Lucas Martínez
- (Argentina) Ignacio Ortiz
- (Chile) Martín Rodríguez

3 goals

- (Argentina) Pedro Ibarra
- (Brazil) Lucas Paixão
- (Chile) Nicolás Renz
- (Chile) Jaime Zarhi
- (Uruguay) Juan Manuel Canessa
- (Venezuela) Reymer Malavé
- (Venezuela) Cristian Vargas

2 goals

- (Argentina) Agustín Mazzilli
- (Brazil) Matheus Borges
- (Brazil) Ernst Rost-Onnes
- (Chile) Felipe Eggers
- (Uruguay) Maximiliano Tixe
- (Venezuela) Wilber Bracamonte

1 goal

- (Brazil) Bruno Mendonça
- (Brazil) Bruno Paes
- (Brazil) André Patrocínio
- (Brazil) Fabien Rickenbach
- (Brazil) Yuri Van der Heijden
- (Chile) Fernando Fernández
- (Chile) Sebastián Kaspch
- (Chile) José Maldonado
- (Peru) Jeanpol Banda Ramos
- (Uruguay) Rafael Colina
- (Uruguay) Patricio Draper
- (Uruguay) Diego Laborde
- (Uruguay) Matías Pereiro
- (Venezuela) Yordano Castro
- (Venezuela) Adán Laya
- (Venezuela) José Oropeza
- (Venezuela) Raudín Simanco

Source: FIH

== Women's tournament ==
The competition consisted of two stages; a preliminary round followed by a classification round.

=== Participating nations ===
- Argentina
- Brazil
- Chile
- Paraguay
- Uruguay
- Venezuela

=== Preliminary round ===
Pos	Team	Pld	W	D	L	GF	GA	GD	Pts	Qualification
1	Argentina	5	5	0	0	39	1	+38	15	Gold-medal match
2	Chile (H)	5	4	0	1	25	5	+20	12	Gold-medal match
3	Uruguay	5	3	0	2	24	9	+15	9	Bronze-medal match
4	Brazil	5	2	0	3	5	26	−21	6	Bronze-medal match
5	Venezuela	5	1	0	4	5	30	−25	3	
6	Paraguay	5	0	0	5	4	31	−27	0	

Source: PanAmHockey
(H) Hosts

=== Classification matches ===
==== Bronze-medal match ====
16 March 2014
13:45
v

Uruguay	3–0	Brazil
	Report

Umpires:
María Locatelli (ARG)
Beatriz Mongelos (PAR)

==== Gold-medal match ====
16 March 2014
18:15
v

Argentina	3–1	Chile
	Report

Umpires:
Suzanne Sutton (USA)
Ayanna McClean (TTO)

=== Final standings ===
Rank	Team
1st place, gold medalist(s)	Argentina
2nd place, silver medalist(s)	Chile
3rd place, bronze medalist(s)	Uruguay
4	Brazil
5	Paraguay
6	Venezuela
