= Joaquín Menini =

Spanish field hockey player (born 1991)

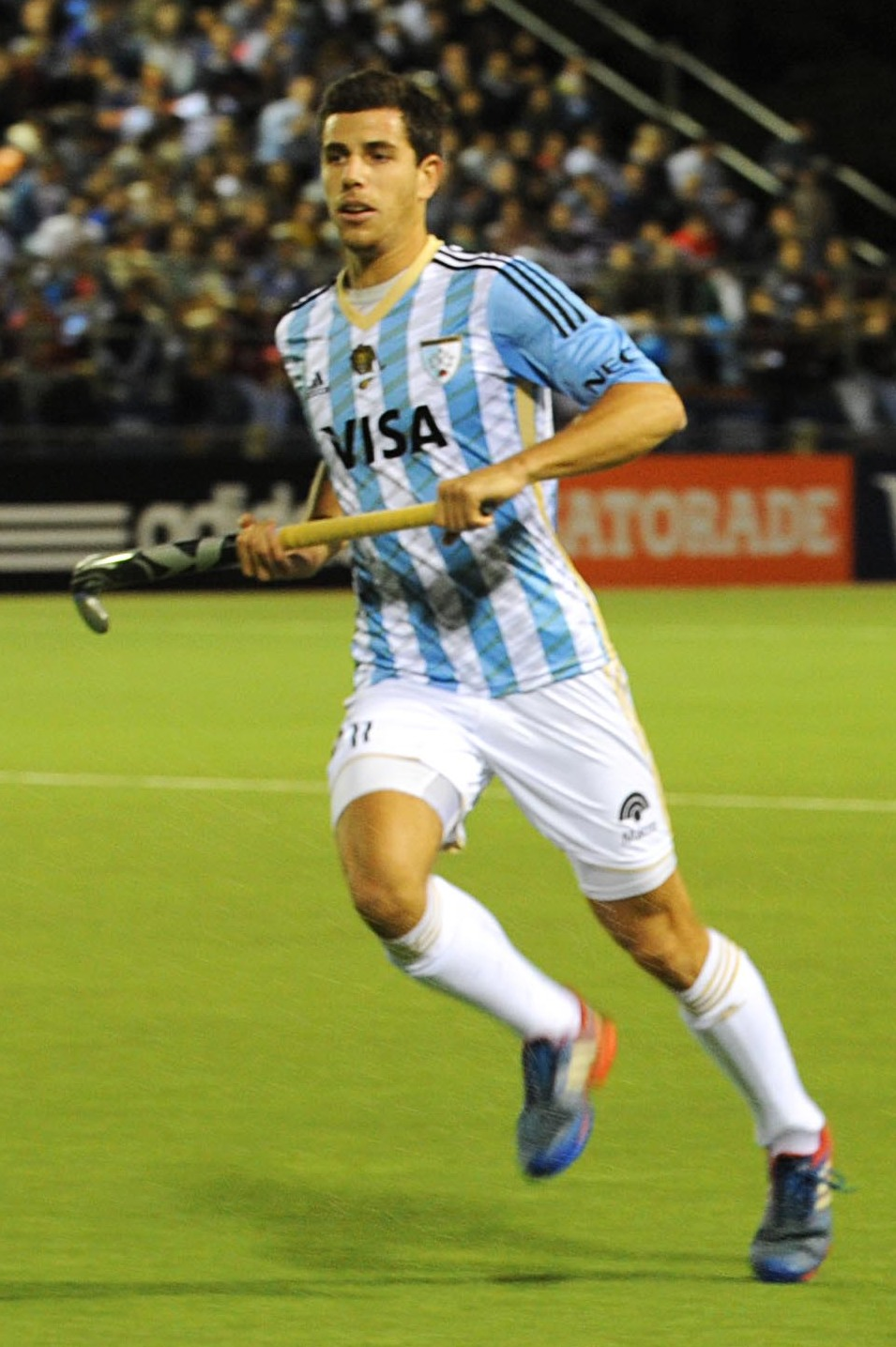
- Menini with Argentina in 2015

Personal information
- Full name: Joaquín Raúl Menini Suero
- Born: Joaquín Raúl Menini; 18 August 1991 (age 35) Buenos Aires, Argentina
- Height: 1.82 m (6 ft 0 in)
- Weight: 76 kg (168 lb)

Sport
- Sport: Field hockey
- Position: Forward
- Club: Rotterdam
Senior career
Years	Team	Caps	Goals
–2014	Mitre	-	-
2014–2016	Club de Campo	-	-
2016–2017	HGC	-	-
2017–2020	Den Bosch	-	-
2020–present	Rotterdam	-	-
National team
Years	Team	Caps	Goals
2014–2019	Argentina	110	-
2022–	Spain	33	(9)
Medal record
Men's field hockey
Representing Argentina
Olympic Games
Gold medal – first place	2016 Rio de Janeiro	Team
World Cup
Silver medal – second place	2026 Wavre/Amstelveen
Bronze medal – third place	2014 The Hague
Pan American Games
Gold medal – first place	2015 Toronto	Team
Pan American Cup
Gold medal – first place	2017 Lancaster
South American Games
Gold medal – first place	2014 Santiago	Team
Pan American Junior Championship
Gold medal – first place	2012 Guadalajara
Representing Spain
EuroHockey Championships
Bronze medal – third place	2025 Mönchengladbach
- Updated on 1 February 2023

Joaquín Raúl Menini Suero (born 18 August 1991) is a field hockey player who plays as a forward for Dutch Hoofdklasse club Rotterdam. Born in Argentina, he represents Spain at international level. He previously played for his country of birth national team.

He was part of the Argentine team that won gold in men's field hockey at the 2016 Summer Olympics in Rio de Janeiro.

== International career ==
=== Argentina ===
He made his debut for the Argentina national team in 2011 in a Champions Challenge's tournament played in South Africa. He won his first gold medal in 2014 South American Games. Menini was part of the Argentina squad that won the bronze medal 2014 World Cup, he also played at the 2018 World Cup.

=== Spain ===
Due to having a Spanish passport alongside his Argentinian one he was eligible to play for Spain in February 2022 after not having played for Argentina for three years. He made his debut for Spain against England on 4 February 2022.

== Club career ==
Menini played in Argentina for Club Ferrocarril Mitre before he moved to Europe in 2014 to play for Club de Campo in Madrid, Spain. He played there until 2016, when he moved to the Netherlands to play for HGC in Wassenaar. After having played one year for them he transferred to another Dutch club, HC Den Bosch where he signed a contract extension in 2018. In July 2020 it was announced he signed for Rotterdam for the 2020–21 season.
