= Brazil men's national field hockey team =

Brazil
- Nickname(s): Samba Boys
- Association: Confederação Brasileira de Hóquei sobre a Grama e Indoor (CBHG)
- Confederation: PAHF
- Head Coach: Cláudio Rocha
- Assistant coach(es): Ronald Stein
- Manager: Luciano Teixeira
- Captain: André Patrocínio
| Home | Away |

FIH ranking
- Current: 34 (4 October 2026)

Olympic Games
- Appearances: 1 (first in 2016)
- Best result: 12th (2016)

Pan American Games
- Appearances: 3 (first in 2007)
- Best result: 4th (2015)

Pan American Cup
- Appearances: 6 (first in 2004)
- Best result: 5th (2017)
Medal record
| Event | 1st | 2nd | 3rd |
|---|---|---|---|
| Pan American Challenge | 1 | 1 | 0 |
| South American Games | 0 | 0 | 2 |
| South American Championship | 0 | 0 | 1 |
| Total | 1 | 1 | 3 |
Pan American Challenge
| Gold medal – first place | 2015 Chiclayo | Team |
| Silver medal – second place | 2011 Rio de Janeiro | Team |
South American Games
| Bronze medal – third place | 2018 Cochabamba | Team |
| Bronze medal – third place | 2022 Asunción | Team |
South American Championship
| Bronze medal – third place | 2013 Santiago | Team |

The Brazil men's national field hockey team (Portuguese: Seleção Brasileira de Hóquei sobre a Grama Masculino) represents Brazil in international men's field hockey competitions.

== Tournament record ==
=== Olympic Games ===
Olympic Games record
| Year | Host | Position | Pld | W | D | L | GF | GA | Squad |
|---|---|---|---|---|---|---|---|---|---|
| 1908 to 1988 | | did not participate | | | | | | | |
| 1992 to 2012 | | did not qualify | | | | | | | |
| 2016 | Rio de Janeiro, Brazil | 12th | 5 | 0 | 0 | 5 | 1 | 46 | Squad |
| 2020 | Tokyo, Japan | did not qualify | | | | | | | |
| 2024 | Paris, France | did not qualify | | | | | | | |
| 2028 | Los Angeles, United States | to be determined | | | | | | | |
| 2032 | Brisbane, Australia | to be determined | | | | | | | |
| Total | | 1/25 | 5 | 0 | 0 | 5 | 1 | 46 | |

=== Pan American Games ===
Pan American Games record
| Year | Host | Position | Pld | W | D | L | GF | GA |
|---|---|---|---|---|---|---|---|---|
| 1967 to 1995 | | did not participate | | | | | | |
| 1999 | Winnipeg, Canada | did not qualify | | | | | | |
| 2003 | Santo Domingo, Dominican Republic | did not qualify | | | | | | |
| 2007 | Rio de Janeiro, Brazil | 8th | 5 | 0 | 0 | 5 | 1 | 57 |
| 2011 | Guadalajara, Mexico | did not qualify | | | | | | |
| 2015 | Toronto, Canada | 4th | 6 | 1 | 2 | 3 | 5 | 17 |
| 2019 | Lima, Peru | did not qualify | | | | | | |
| 2023 | Santiago, Chile | 5th | 5 | 3 | 0 | 2 | 13 | 9 |
| 2027 | Lima, Peru | did not qualify | | | | | | |
| Total | | 4th place | 16 | 4 | 2 | 10 | 19 | 83 |

=== Pan American Cup ===
Pan American Cup record
| Year | Host | Position | Pld | W | D | L | GF | GA |
|---|---|---|---|---|---|---|---|---|
| 2000 | Havana, Cuba | did not participate | | | | | | |
| 2004 | London, Canada | 10th | 6 | 1 | 2 | 3 | 6 | 43 |
| 2009 | Santiago, Chile | 7th | 5 | 1 | 0 | 4 | 5 | 38 |
| 2013 | Brampton, Canada | 7th | 5 | 0 | 1 | 4 | 7 | 18 |
| 2017 | Lancaster, United States | 5th | 5 | 2 | 1 | 2 | 10 | 8 |
| 2022 | Santiago, Chile | 6th | 4 | 0 | 0 | 4 | 1 | 23 |
| 2025 | Montevideo, Uruguay | 6th | 5 | 2 | 1 | 2 | 9 | 17 |
| Total | | 5th place | 30 | 6 | 5 | 19 | 38 | 147 |

=== South American Games ===
South American Games record
| Year | Host | Position | Pld | W | D | L | GF | GA |
|---|---|---|---|---|---|---|---|---|
| 2006 | Buenos Aires, Argentina | 5th | 4 | 0 | 0 | 4 | 3 | 30 |
| 2014 | Santiago, Chile | 4th | 6 | 3 | 0 | 3 | 18 | 15 |
| 2018 | Cochabamba, Bolivia | 3rd | 5 | 2 | 1 | 2 | 9 | 12 |
| 2022 | Asunción, Paraguay | 3rd | 5 | 3 | 0 | 2 | 23 | 21 |
| 2026 | Santa Fe, Argentina | 4th | 5 | 2 | 1 | 2 | 10 | 12 |
| Total | | 1st place | 25 | 10 | 2 | 13 | 63 | 90 |

=== South American Championship ===
South American Championship
| Year | Position | Pld | W | D* | L | GF | GA |
|---|---|---|---|---|---|---|---|
| (Chile) 2003 | 5th | 5 | 1 | 0 | 4 | 7 | 41 |
| (Uruguay) 2008 | 4th | 6 | 3 | 0 | 3 | 10 | 16 |
| (Brazil) 2010 | 4th | 6 | 2 | 0 | 4 | 10 | 23 |
| (Chile) 2013 | 3rd | 6 | 2 | 1 | 3 | 12 | 17 |
| (Peru) 2016 | did not participate | | | | | | |
| Total | 4/5 | 23 | 8 | 1 | 14 | 39 | 97 |

=== Pan American Challenge ===
Pan American Challenge record
| Year | Position | Pld | W | D* | L | GF | GA |
|---|---|---|---|---|---|---|---|
| (Brazil) 2011 | 2nd | 4 | 2 | 1 | 1 | 18 | 3 |
| (Peru) 2015 | 1st | 5 | 4 | 1 | 0 | 30 | 3 |
| (Peru) 2021 | did not participate | | | | | | |
| Total | 2/3 | 9 | 6 | 2 | 1 | 48 | 6 |

=== Hockey World League ===
Hockey World League record
| Season | Position | Pld | W | D* | L | GF | GA |
|---|---|---|---|---|---|---|---|
| 2012–13 | 31st | 5 | 0 | 0 | 5 | 3 | 33 |
| 2014–15 | —N/a | 3 | 1 | 1 | 1 | 10 | 4 |
| 2016–17 | did not participate | | | | | | |
| Total | 2/3 | 8 | 1 | 1 | 6 | 13 | 37 |

== Current squad ==
The following 19 players were named on 19 January 2022 for the 2022 Men's Pan American Cup in Santiago, Chile.

Caps updated as of 28 January 2022, after the match against Mexico.

| No. | Pos. | Player | Date of birth (age) | Caps | Club |
|---|---|---|---|---|---|
| 2 | | Bruno Mendonça | 7 January 1984 (age 42) | 81 | (Brazil) Rio |
| 5 | | Joaquín Lopez | 12 February 1990 (age 36) | 34 | (Spain) Castelldefels |
| 6 | GK | Matheus Medeiros | 22 March 2000 (age 26) | 0 | (Brazil) SESI |
| 7 | | André Patrocínio (Captain) | 20 February 1990 (age 36) | 97 | (Brazil) Rio |
| 8 | | Yuri van der Heijden | 20 July 1990 (age 36) | 109 | (England) Hampstead & Westminster |
| 9 | | Gabriel Martins | 5 May 2000 (age 26) | 7 | (Brazil) São José |
| 10 | | Lucas Paixão | 2 September 1994 (age 32) | 80 | (Brazil) Florianópolis |
| 11 | | Lucas Varela | 7 June 2004 (age 22) | 4 | (Brazil) SESI |
| 12 | | Arthur Giro | 29 December 2003 (age 22) | 4 | (Brazil) Sociedade Germânia |
| 13 | | Bruno Paes | 24 June 1993 (age 33) | 85 | (Brazil) Florianópolis |
| 14 | | Lucas Lemos | 11 February 2001 (age 25) | 7 | (Brazil) Desterro |
| 15 | | Patrick van der Heijden | 19 September 1992 (age 34) | 82 | (Netherlands) Voordaan |
| 17 | | Paulo Rigueira | 22 March 2000 (age 26) | 23 | (Brazil) Deodoro |
| 19 | | Vinicius Vaz | 6 December 2001 (age 24) | 18 | (Brazil) Desterro |
| 21 | | Marcos Pasin | 27 May 1993 (age 33) | 52 | (Brazil) Florianópolis |
| 27 | | Paulo Batista | 27 January 1993 (age 33) | 49 | (Brazil) Desterro |
| 28 | | Lucas de Moraes | 28 August 2000 (age 26) | 0 | (Brazil) Rio |
| 31 | GK | Rodrigo Faustino (Captain) | 6 January 1987 (age 39) | 73 | (Brazil) Florianópolis |
| 50 | | Mateus Santos | 12 December 1999 (age 26) | 4 | (Brazil) Rio |

== Results and fixtures ==
The following is a list of match results in the last 12 months, as well as any future matches that have been scheduled.

Win Draw Loss Fixture

=== 2026 ===
| 13 September 2026 2026 ODESUR Pool A | Brazil | 3–2 | Uruguay | Santa Fe, Argentina |
| 15:00 | Patrocínio 8'; Smith 9'; Lopez 56' | Report | Moria 44'; Pereiro 56' | Stadium: Estadio Asociacion Santafesina de Hockey |

| 16 September 2026 2026 ODESUR Pool A | Brazil | 1–4 | Argentina | Santa Fe, Argentina |
| 10:00 | Imer 26' | Report | Agostini 4', 13'; Kovalivker 17'; Fernandez 20' | Stadium: Estadio Asociacion Santafesina de Hockey |

| 18 September 2026 2026 ODESUR Pool A | Peru | 1–4 | Brazil | Santa Fe, Argentina |
| 10:00 | Diaz Espinosa 49' | Report | Lopez 45'; Imer 49' van der Heijden 55'; Martins 60' | Stadium: Estadio Asociacion Santafesina de Hockey |

| 19 September 2026 2026 ODESUR Pool A | Brazil | 1–4 | Chile | Santa Fe, Argentina |
| 12:00 | van der Heijden 5' | Report | Wolansky 15'; Valenzuela 23'; Contardo 30' de Witt 55' | Stadium: Estadio Asociacion Santafesina de Hockey |

| 22 September 2026 2026 ODESUR Bronze medal match | Brazil | 1–1 (2–3 p) | Uruguay | Santa Fe, Argentina |
| 09:00 | Patrocínio 40' | Report | Galindo 59' | Stadium: Estadio Asociacion Santafesina de Hockey |
| | Penalties |
| | Heijden (penalty shoot-out missed); J. Lopez (penalty shoot-out missed); Patrocínio (penalty shoot-out missed); Imer (penalty shoot-out scored); Smith (penalty shoot-out scored) | | (penalty shoot-out missed) Cantaro; (penalty shoot-out missed) Moria; (penalty shoot-out scored) T. Lopez; (penalty shoot-out scored) Martinoni; (penalty shoot-out scored) Pereiro |

== See also ==
- Brazil women's national field hockey team
