= Nicolás Della Torre =

Argentine field hockey player

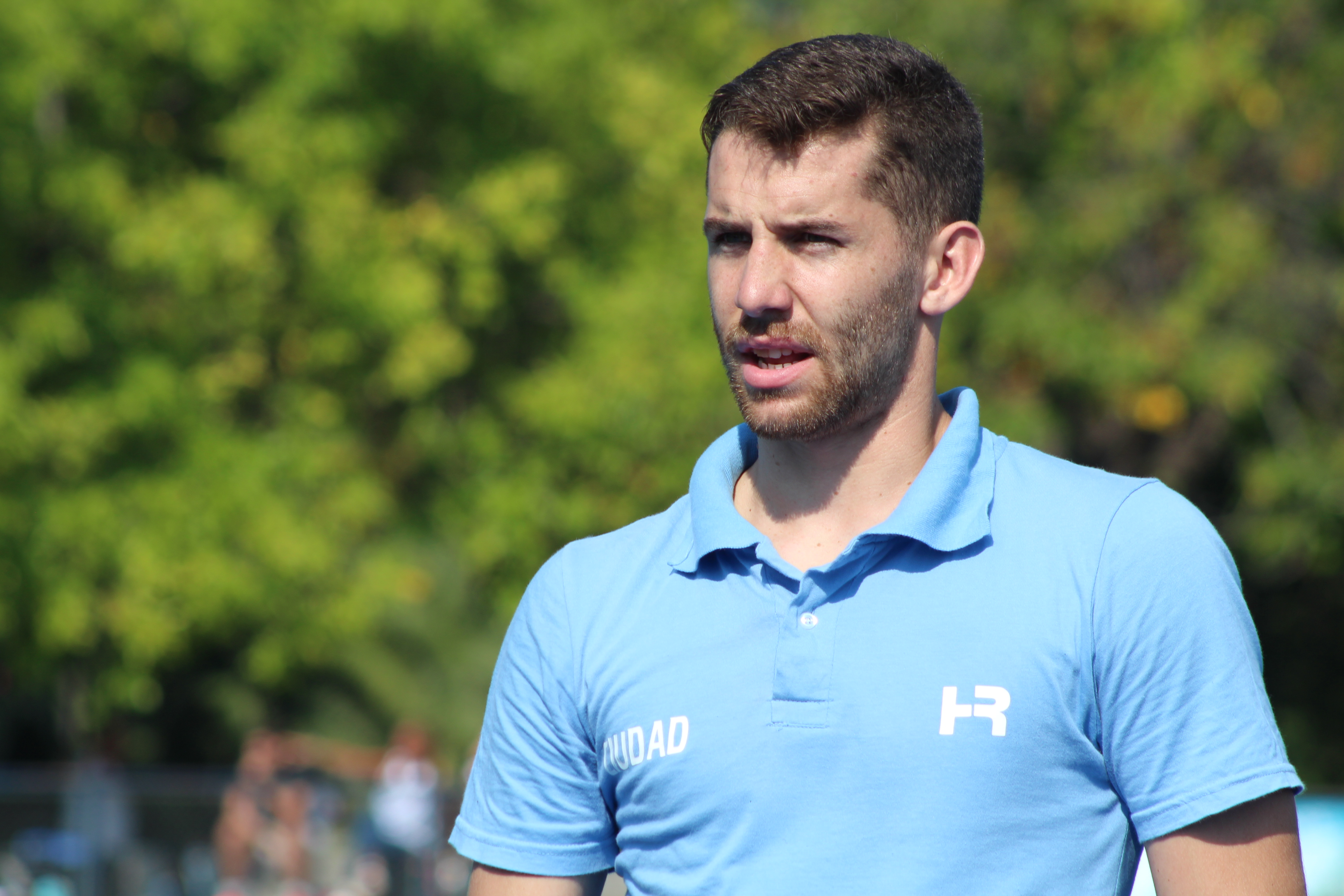
- Nicolás Della Torre

Personal information
- Full name: Nicolás Enrique Della Torre
- Born: 1 March 1990 (age 36) Buenos Aires, Argentina

Sport
- Sport: Field hockey
- Position: Midfielder / Forward
- Club: Dragons
Senior career
Years	Team	Caps	Goals
–2017	Ciudad de Buenos Aires	-	-
2017–2019	Den Bosch	-	-
2017	→ Terengganu	-	-
2019–2020	Leuven	-	-
2020–present	Dragons	-	-
National team
Years	Team	Caps	Goals
2013–present	Argentina	77	(26)
Medal record
Men's field hockey
Representing Argentina
World Cup
Bronze medal – third place	2026 Wavre/Amstelveen
Pan American Games
Gold medal – first place	2015 Toronto	Team
Gold medal – first place	2023 Santiago	Team
Pan American Cup
Gold medal – first place	2022 Santiago
Gold medal – first place	2025 Montevideo
South American Championship
Gold medal – first place	2013 Santiago
- Updated on 5 February 2023

Nicolás Enrique Della Torre (born 1 March 1990) is an Argentine field hockey player who plays as a midfielder or forward for Belgian Hockey League club Dragons and the Argentina national team.

== Club career ==
Della Torre played in Argentina for Ciudad de Buenos Aires. When he became the top scorer of the Argentinian league in 2017, he transferred to the Netherlands to play for Den Bosch. Due to problems with getting an Italian passport to be eligible to play in the Netherlands, he could not play for Den Bosch in the first half of the 2017–18 season. He played in Malaysia Hockey League for Terengganu during the 2017 Dutch winter break. In April 2019, he agreed to play for Leuven from the 2019–20 season onwards. In his final season for Den Bosch he scored 13 goals which made him the seventh highest top scorer of the season. After one season he left Leuven for Dragons. In his first season he won the Belgian league title.

== International career ==
Della Torre won his first medal with the national team at the 2013 South American Championship. In June 2015 he was selected for the 2015 Pan American Games, where they won the gold medal. He made his World Cup debut at the 2023 Men's FIH Hockey World Cup.

== Honours ==
=== International ===
Argentina

- Pan American Games gold medal: 2015
- Pan American Cup: 2022
- South American Championship: 2013

=== Club ===
Terengganu

- TNB Cup: 2017

Dragons

- Belgian Hockey League: 2020–21
