= 2013 Men's South American Hockey Championship =

Field hockey tournament

Tournament details
- Host country: Chile
- City: Santiago
- Dates: 26 January – 2 February
- Teams: 6 (from 1 confederation)

Final positions
- Champions: Argentina (4th title)
- Runner-up: Chile
- Third place: Brazil

Tournament statistics
- Matches played: 18
- Goals scored: 142 (7.89 per match)
- Top scorer: (Argentina) Lucas Vila (15 goals)
- Best player: (Argentina) Guillermo Schickendantz

The 2013 Men's South American Hockey Championship was the fourth edition of the Men's South American Hockey Championship and the sixth if you count the South American Games. It was held from 26 January until 2 February 2013 in Santiago, Chile.

Argentina won the tournament for the fourth time in a row by defeating Chile 4–3 in the final.

== Results ==
All times are local, CLST (UTC–3).

=== Pool ===
Pos	Team	Pld	W	D	L	GF	GA	GD	Pts	Qualification
1	Argentina	5	5	0	0	65	2	+63	15	Final
2	Chile (H)	5	4	0	1	42	7	+35	12	Final
3	Peru	5	2	1	2	7	34	−27	7	Third place game
4	Brazil	5	1	1	3	8	16	−8	4	Third place game
5	Uruguay	5	1	1	3	3	22	−19	4	Fifth place game
6	Paraguay	5	0	1	4	2	46	−44	1	Fifth place game

Source: FIH
Rules for classification: 1) Points; 2) matches won; 3) goal difference; 4) goals for; 5) head-to-head result.
(H) Hosts

26 January 2013
09:00

Argentina	19–0	Peru
Schickendantz 11', 31', 35+', 47', 53'; Vila 14', 26', 41'; Della Torre 18', 54', 56', 65', 68'; Peillat 21', 39'; Montelli 25', 50'; Rossi 37'; Brunet 70'	Report

Umpires:
Sebastian Bustamente (CHI)
Matias Barbosa (CHI)

26 January 2013
10:45

Brazil	1–2	Uruguay
Da Veiga Pacheco 45'	Report	Pereiro 55', 68'

Umpires:
Saleem Aaron (USA))
Andres Ledesma (ARG)

26 January 2013
12:30

Chile	17–0	Paraguay
Rodriguez 9', 56'; Zarhi 12'; J. Richter 14', 24', 32', 45', 64', 70'; Ovalle 19'; Eggers 22'; A. Berczely 26', 34', 62'; J. Berczely 27', 53'; Zirpel 51'	Report

Umpires:
Federico Garcia (URU)
Reinier Diaz Garcia (CUB)

27 January 2013
09:00

Peru	1–1	Brazil
Morales 31'	Report	De Oliveira 12'

Umpires:
Sebastian Bustamente (CHI)
Reinier Diaz Garcia (CUB)

27 January 2013
10:45

Argentina	19–1	Paraguay
Bergner 4'; Peillat 9', 14', 40', 42', 44'; Brunet 11'; Vila 12', 23', 33', 58', 61', 70'; Lopez 17'; Schickendantz 19'; Agulleiro 20'; Montelli 55'; Own goal 63'; Paredes 67'	Report	Alvarez 70'

Umpires:
Oliver Hockey (BRA)
Federico Garcia (URU)

27 January 2013
12:30

Chile	8–0	Uruguay
Eggers 4'; Purcell 34', 66'; S. Richter 37'; Rodriguez 38'; A. Berczely 47', 69'; Valenzuela 53'	Report

Umpires:
Saleem Aaron (USA)
Andres Ledesma (ARG)

29 January 2013
13:30

Peru	1–14	Chile
Diaz Espinosa 27'	Report	Valenzuela 9'; J. Richter 12'; Purcell 15', 21'; Zirpel 16'; A. Berczely 22'; J. Berczely 23', 25', 35'; Rodriguez 33', 57'; S. Richter 51'; Kapsch 64'; F. Eggers 68'

Umpires:
Federico Garcia (URU)
Oliver Hock (BRA)

29 January 2013
15:15

Uruguay	1–1	Paraguay
A. Lopez 63'	Report	Russo 35'

Umpires:
Andres Ledesma (ARG)
Sebastian Bustamante (CHI)

29 January 2013
17:00

Brazil	1–10	Argentina
Paixão 49'	Report	Montelli 8'; Rossi 12'; Ortiz 25'; Vila 29', 40', 70'; Peillat 34'; Schickendantz 55', 61', 62'

Umpires:
Saleem Aaron (USA)
Matias Barbosa (CHI)

30 January 2013
13:15

Uruguay	0–1	Peru
	Report	Marquez Veaizan 23'

Umpires:
Oliver Hock (BRA)
Sebastian Bustamante (CHI)

30 January 2013
16:45

Chile	0–6	Argentina
	Report	Vila 27'; Schickendantz 42', 44'; Bergner 52'; Della Torre 53'; Agulleiro 62'

Umpires:
Saleem Aaron (USA)
Federico Garcia (URU)

30 January 2013
18:30

Paraguay	0–5	Brazil
	Report	De Oliveira 8', 13'; Patrocínio 17'; De Paula 37'; Paixão 69'

Umpires:
Andres Ledesma (ARG)
Reinier Diaz Garcia (CUB)

1 February 2013
08:15

Paraguay	0–4	Peru
	Report	Ruiz Sessarego 6'; Marquez Veaizan 15', 31'; Lopez 63'

Umpires:
Federico Garcia (URU)
Matias Barbosa (CHI)

1 February 2013
10:00

Argentina	11–0	Uruguay
Della Torre 4', 8'; Peillat 19'; Mazzilli 22', 37', 50'; Brunet 24'; Salis 39'; Schickendantz 41'; López 48'; Vila 65'	Report

Umpires:
Oliver Hock (BRA)
Saleem Aaron (USA)

1 February 2013
11:45

Brazil	0–3	Chile
	Report	J. Richter 6'; Purcell 49'; Kapsch 54'

Umpires:
Andres Ledesma (ARG)
Reinier Diaz Garcia (CUB)

=== Classification ===
==== Fifth and sixth place ====
2 February 2013
08:30

Uruguay	2–1	Paraguay
Iglesias 46'; Laborde 63'	Report	Zambrini 47'

Umpires:
Oliver Hock (BRA)
Reinier Diaz Garcia (CUB)

==== Third and fourth place ====
2 February 2013
10:30

Peru	1–4	Brazil
Own goal 67'	Report	Paixão 5', 38'; Patrocínio 15'; Vehrle-Smith 51'

Umpires:
Andres Ledesma (ARG)
Sebastian Bustamante (CHI)

==== Final ====
2 February 2013
18:30

Argentina	4–3	Chile
Vila 11'; Own goal 35'; Rossi 39'; Peillat 69'	Report	Richter 8'; Zarhi 45'; Purcell 70+'

Umpires:
Federico Garcia (URU)
Saleem Aaron (USA)

== Statistics ==
=== Final standings ===
1. Argentina
2. Chile
3. Brazil
4. Peru
5. Uruguay
6. Paraguay

=== Awards ===
The following awards were given at the conclusion of the tournament.

Player of the tournament	Goalkeeper of the tournament	Top Scorer of the tournament	Fair play award
(Argentina) Guillermo Schickendantz	(Peru) Felix Maferetti Gutierrez	(Argentina) Lucas Vila	Peru

=== Goalscorers ===
There were 142 goals scored in 18 matches, for an average of 7.89 goals per match.

15 goals

- (Argentina) Lucas Vila

12 goals

- (Argentina) Guillermo Schickendantz

10 goals

- (Argentina) Gonzalo Peillat

8 goals

- (Argentina) Nicolás della Torre
- (Chile) Jan Richter

6 goals

- (Chile) Alexis Berczely
- (Chile) Pablo Purcell

5 goals

- (Chile) Jan Berczely
- (Chile) Martin Rodriguez

4 goals

- (Argentina) Santiago Montelli
- (Brazil) Lucas Paixão

3 goals

- (Argentina) Manuel Brunet
- (Argentina) Agustín Mazzilli
- (Argentina) Lucas Rossi
- (Brazil) Eduardo de Oliveira
- (Chile) Felipe Eggers
- (Chile) Sven Richter
- (Peru) Arturo Jose Marquez Veaizan

2 goals

- (Argentina) Juan Agulleiro
- (Argentina) Ignacio Bergner
- (Argentina) Juan Martín López
- (Brazil) André Patrocínio
- (Chile) Sebastián Kapsch
- (Chile) Raimundo Valenzuela
- (Chile) Jaime Zarhi
- (Chile) Jose Zirpel
- (Uruguay) Matias Pereiro

1 goal

- (Argentina) Ignacio Ortiz
- (Argentina) Matías Paredes
- (Argentina) Nahuel Salis
- (Brazil) Augusto de Paula
- (Brazil) Thiago da Veiga Pacheco
- (Brazil) Stephane Vehrle-Smith
- (Chile) Andres Ovalle
- (Paraguay) Jorge Alvarez
- (Paraguay) Julio Russo
- (Paraguay) Pablo Zambrini
- (Peru) Rodrigo Diaz Espinosa
- (Peru) Fernando Lopez
- (Peru) Carlos Morales
- (Peru) David Eugenio Sergio Ruiz Sessarego
- (Uruguay) Federico Iglesias
- (Uruguay) Diego Laborde
- (Uruguay) Alexis Lopez

1 own goal

- Brazil (against Peru)
- Chile (against Argentina)
- Paraguay (against Argentina)

Source: FIH

== See also ==
- 2013 Women's South American Hockey Championship
