= Men's Pan American Cup =

Men's Pan American Cup may refer to

- Men's Pan American Cup (field hockey)
- Men's Pan American Cup (volleyball)
