= Uruguay national field hockey team =

Uruguay national field hockey team may refer to:

- Uruguay men's national field hockey team
- Uruguay women's national field hockey team
