= Agustín Mazzilli =

Argentine field hockey player (born 1989)

Personal information
- Full name: Agustín Alejandro Mazzilli
- Born: 20 June 1989 (age 37) Lanús, Argentina
- Height: 1.72 m (5 ft 8 in)
- Weight: 76 kg (168 lb)

Sport
- Sport: Field hockey
- Position: Midfielder / Forward
- Club: Lomas
Senior career
Years	Team	Caps	Goals
–2010	Lomas	-	-
2010–2012	Leuven	-	-
2012–2013	Léopold	-	-
2013–2014	Lomas	-	-
2014–2016	Léopold	-	-
2016–2018	Oranje-Rood	-	-
2018–2021	Pinoké	-	-
2021–2023	Braxgata	-	-
2023–present	Lomas	-	-
National team
Years	Team	Caps	Goals
2009–present	Argentina	251	(85)
Medal record
Men's field hockey
Representing Argentina
Olympic Games
Gold medal – first place	2016 Rio de Janeiro	Team
World Cup
Bronze medal – third place	2014 The Hague
Pan American Games
Gold medal – first place	2011 Guadalajara	Team
Gold medal – first place	2015 Toronto	Team
Gold medal – first place	2019 Lima	Team
Gold medal – first place	2023 Santiago	Team
Pan American Cup
Gold medal – first place	2013 Brampton
Gold medal – first place	2017 Lancaster
South American Games
Gold medal – first place	2014 Santiago	Team
South American Championship
Gold medal – first place	2010 Rio de Janeiro
Gold medal – first place	2013 Santiago
Hockey World League
Silver medal – second place	2016–17 Bhubaneswar	Team
Pan American Junior Championship
Gold medal – first place	2008 Port of Spain
- Updated on 5 September 2023

Agustín Alejandro Mazzilli (born 20 June 1989) is an Argentine field hockey player who plays as a midfielder or forward for Lomas and the Argentine national team.

== Club career ==
In Argentina, Mazzilli played for Lomas Athletic Club. His first club in Europe was KHC Leuven from Belgium. After two seasons with Leuven, he went to another Belgian club Royal Léopold, where he played for three seasons. In 2016 he transferred to HC Oranje-Rood in the Netherlands, where he signed a contract for two years. When his contract expired, he signed a 2-year contract for Pinoké from Amstelveen. After the 2020 Summer Olympics he returned to Belgium to play for Braxgata. He ended his career in Europe in 2023 and played for Lomas again.

== International career ==
Mazzilli was a part of Argentina's gold medal-winning team at the 2016 Olympics. At the 2012 Summer Olympics, he competed for the national team in the men's tournament. He has won the bronze medal at the 2014 Men's Hockey World Cup. In July 2019, he was selected in the Argentina squad for the 2019 Pan American Games. They won the gold medal by defeating Canada 5–2 in the final.

== Honours ==
=== International ===
Argentina

- Olympic Gold medal: 2016
- Pan American Games: 2011, 2015, 2019
- Pan American Cup: 2013, 2017
- South American Games: 2014
- South American Championship: 2010, 2013

Argentina U21

- Pan American Junior Championship: 2008

=== Individual ===
- Pan American Elite Team: 2017, 2019
