= Paraguay national field hockey team =

Paraguay national field hockey team may refer to:

- Paraguay men's national field hockey team
- Paraguay women's national field hockey team
