= Paraguay men's national field hockey team =

Paraguay
- Nickname(s): Los Aguará
- Association: Asociación Paraguaya de Hockey
- Confederation: PAHF (Americas)

FIH ranking
- Current: 91 (4 October 2026)
- Highest: 59 (2014)
- Lowest: 94 (June 2019)

Pan American Games
- Appearances: 1 (first in 1995)
- Best result: 7th (1995)

The Paraguay men's national field hockey team represents Paraguay in international field hockey competitions, that are organized by the Pan American Hockey Federation (PAHF), the International Hockey Federation (FIH) and the International Olympic Committee (IOC), and is governed by the Asociación Paraguaya de Hockey.

Paraguay participates regularly in the South American Championships and had participated in the 1995 Pan American games in Mar del Plata, Argentina. The country opened its first synthetic hockey pitch in 2013.

== Tournament History ==
=== Pan American Games ===
Pan American Games record
Year	Round	Position	Pld	W	D	L	GF	GA
(Canada) 1967 until (Cuba) 1991	Did not participate							
(Argentina) 1995	Group stage	7th	6	0	0	6	1	73
(Canada) 1999 until (Peru) 2019	Did not qualify							
Total	7th (1x)	1/14	6	0	0	6	1	73

=== World League ===
FIH Hockey World League record
Season	Position	Round	Pld	W	D *	L	GF	GA
2012–13	Did not participate							
2014–15	Did not participate							
2016–17	Unranked	Round 1	5	1	1	3	13	20
Total	–	Round 1 (1x)	5	1	1	3	13	20

*Draws include matches decided on a penalty shoot-out.

=== Pan American Challenge ===
Pan American Challenge record
Year	Round	Position	Pld	W	D	L	GF	GA
(Brazil) 2011	Group stage	3rd	4	0	0	4	1	33
(Peru) 2015	Did not participate							
(Peru) 2021	Did not participate							
(Peru) 2024	3rd place game	3rd	7	1	0	6	4	35
Total	Best: 3rd	2/4	11	1	0	10	5	68

=== South American Games ===
South American Games record
Year	Round	Position	Pld	W	D	L	GF	GA
(Argentina) 2006	Did not participate							
(Chile) 2014	Did not participate							
(Bolivia) 2018	7th place game	7th	5	1	1	3	6	17
(Paraguay) 2022	5th place game	6th	4	1	0	3	9	18
Total	Best: 5th	2/4	9	2	1	6	15	35

=== South American Championships ===
South American Championships
Year	Position
(Chile) 2003	6th
(Uruguay) 2008	7th
(Brazil) 2010	6th
(Chile) 2013	6th
(Peru) 2016	4th
Best result: 4th (1x)

== See also ==
- Paraguay women's national field hockey team
