= Peru men's national field hockey team =

Peru
- Association: Federación Deportiva Peruana de Hockey
- Confederation: PAHF (Americas)
- Head Coach: Carlos 'Litros' Morales
- Manager: Felix Maffereti
- Captain: Vincenzo Mendez; Rodrigo Diaz Espinosa
Home	Away

FIH ranking
- Current: 79 ▼6 (4 October 2026)

Pan American Games
- Appearances: 3 (first in 1987)
- Best result: 8th (2019, 2023)

Pan American Cup
- Appearances: 1 (first in 2000)
- Best result: 8th (2000)
Medal record
South American Games
Bronze medal – third place	2006 Buenos Aires	Team
South American Championship
Bronze medal – third place	2003 Santiago

The Peru men's national field hockey team represents Peru in men's international field hockey and is organized by the Federación Deportiva Peruana de Hockey, the governing body of field hockey in Peru.

Peru has never qualified for the Summer Olympics or the World Cup. They have appeared once in the Pan American Games and the Pan American Cup until 2018 but they played their second Pan American Games in 2019.

== Tournament record ==
=== Pan American Games ===
- 1987 – 10th place
- 2019 – 8th place
- 2023 – 8th place

=== Pan American Cup ===
- 2000 – 8th place
- 2022 – Withdrawn

=== Pan American Challenge ===
- 2015 – 5th place
- 2021 – (silver)
- 2024 – (silver)

=== South American Games ===
- 2006 – (bronze)
- 2014 – 6th place
- 2018 – 5th place
- 2022 – 4th place
- 2026 – 5th place

=== South American Championship ===
- 2003 – (bronze)
- 2008 – 5th place
- 2013 – 4th place
- 2016 – 5th place

=== Hockey World League ===
- 2016–17 – Round 1

=== FIH Hockey Series ===
- 2018–19 – First round

=== Bolivarian Games ===
- 2013 – 4th place

== Results and fixtures ==
The following is a list of match results in the last 12 months, as well as any future matches that have been scheduled.

Win Draw Loss Fixture

=== 2026 ===
13 September 2026 2026 ODESUR Pool A	Chile	7–0	Peru	Santa Fe, Argentina
11:00	Valenzuela 5'; Contardo 19'; Amoroso 21'; Hurtado 25'; Acevedo 39'; Wolansky 41'; Gesswein 58'	Report		Stadium: Estadio Asociacion Santafesina de Hockey

14 September 2026 2026 ODESUR Pool A	Argentina	22–0	Peru	Santa Fe, Argentina
12:00	Agostini 4', 12', 15', 36', 45'; Kovalivker 11', 39'; Torrigiani 11', 26', 43', 51'; Tarazona 19', 31', 58'; Dulor 42'; Ruiz 44'; Serrano 45'; Costa 46', 47'; Rodriguez 54'; Habif 54'; Ferreiro 57'	Report		Stadium: Estadio Asociacion Santafesina de Hockey

16 September 2026 2026 ODESUR Pool A	Uruguay	2–1	Peru	Santa Fe, Argentina
14:00	Cantaro 12'; Pereiro 22'	Report	Curo 14'	Stadium: Estadio Asociacion Santafesina de Hockey

18 September 2026 2026 ODESUR Pool A	Peru	1–4	Brazil	Santa Fe, Argentina
10:00	Diaz Espinosa 49'	Report	Lopez 45'; Imer 49' van der Heijden 55'; Martins 60'	Stadium: Estadio Asociacion Santafesina de Hockey

== See also ==
- Peru women's national field hockey team
