= Men's Pan American Challenge =

International men's field hockey competition

- Most recent season or competition: 2024 Men's Pan American Challenge
- Sport: Field hockey
- Founded: 2011; 15 years ago
- First season: 2011
- No. of teams: 4
- Confederation: PAHF (Americas)
- Most recent champion: Trinidad and Tobago (1st title) (2024)
- Most titles: Brazil; Mexico; Trinidad and Tobago; Uruguay (1 title each)

The Men's Pan American Challenge is a quadrennial international men's field hockey competition in the Americas organized by the Pan American Hockey Federation. The tournament serves as the qualification tournament for the next Men's Pan American Cup.

The tournament was created in 2011 when the PAHF created a tiered system with the Pan American Challenge as the second tier below the Pan American Cup. The first edition was held in Rio de Janeiro, Brazil.

== Results ==
Year	Host	Final			Third place match			Number of teams
Year	Host	Winner	Score	Runner-up	Third place	Score	Fourth place	Number of teams
2011; Details	Rio de Janeiro, Brazil	Uruguay	Round-robin	Brazil	Paraguay	Only three teams		3
2015; Details	Chiclayo, Peru	Brazil	1–0	Venezuela	Uruguay	2–2 (3–2 s.o.)	Guyana	8
2021; Details	Lima, Peru	Mexico	Round-robin	Peru	Ecuador	Only three teams		3
2024; Details	Lima, Peru	Trinidad and Tobago	6–0	Peru	Paraguay	2–1	Guatemala	4

=== Summary ===
Team	Winners	Runners-up	Third place	Fourth place
Brazil	1 (2015)	1 (2011*)		
Uruguay	1 (2011)		1 (2015)	
Mexico	1 (2021)			
Trinidad and Tobago	1 (2024)			
Peru		2 (2021*, 2024*)		
Venezuela		1 (2015)		
Paraguay			2 (2011, 2024)	
Ecuador			1 (2021)	
Guyana				1 (2015)
Guatemala				1 (2024)

* = hosts

=== Team appearances ===
Nation	(Brazil) 2011	(Peru) 2015	(Peru) 2021	(Peru) 2024	Total
Brazil	2nd	1st	–	–	2
Ecuador	–	8th	3rd	–	2
Guatemala	–	–	–	4th	1
Guyana	–	4th	–	–	1
Mexico	–	–	1st	–	1
Panama	–	7th	–	–	1
Paraguay	3rd	–	–	3rd	2
Peru	–	5th	2nd	2nd	3
Puerto Rico	–	6th	–	–	1
Trinidad and Tobago	–	–	–	1st	1
Uruguay	1st	3rd	–	–	2
Venezuela	–	2nd	–	–	1
Total	3	8	3	4	

== See also ==
- Men's Pan American Cup
- Women's Pan American Challenge
