= Maico Casella =

Argentine field hockey player

Personal information
- Full name: Maico Casella Schuth
- Born: 5 June 1997 (age 29) Buenos Aires, Argentina
- Height: 1.77 m (5 ft 10 in)
- Weight: 73 kg (161 lb)

Sport
- Sport: Field hockey
- Position: Forward
- Club: Gantoise
Youth career
- Team
- –: San Fernando
Senior career
| Years | Team | Caps | Goals |
| –2019 | San Fernando | - | - |
| 2019–2021 | HGC | - | - |
| 2021–2022 | Tilburg | - | - |
| 2022–2023 | HGC | - | - |
| 2023–2024 | San Fernando | - | - |
| 2024–present | Gantoise | - | - |
National team
| Years | Team | Caps | Goals |
| 2016 | Argentina U21 | 18 | (25) |
| 2018–present | Argentina | 144 | (99) |
Medal record
Men's field hockey
Representing Argentina
World Cup
| Bronze medal – third place | 2026 Wavre/Amstelveen |
Pan American Games
| Gold medal – first place | 2019 Lima | Team |
| Gold medal – first place | 2023 Santiago | Team |
Pan American Cup
| Gold medal – first place | 2017 Lancaster |
| Gold medal – first place | 2022 Santiago |
| Gold medal – first place | 2025 Montevideo |
Hockey World League
| Silver medal – second place | 2016–17 Bhubaneswar | Team |
Pan American Junior Championship
| Gold medal – first place | 2016 Toronto |
- Updated on 22 April 2025

Maico Casella Schuth (Note: In this Spanish name, the first or paternal surname is Casella and the second or maternal family name is Schuth.) (born 5 June 1997) is an Argentine field hockey player who plays as a forward for Belgian Hockey League club Gantoise and the Argentina national team.

== Club career ==
Casella started playing hockey at age six in Argentina for San Fernando. In July 2019, he signed for HGC in the Netherlands. He scored 27 goals in two seasons for HGC and he left them in 2021 for another Dutch club HC Tilburg, where he signed for two seasons. In his first season at Tilburg they were relegated and he did not stay in Tilburg for his second season. On 8 July 2022 it was announced he would return to HGC. Due to personal reasons he returned to Argentina in the middle of the 2022–23 season. After the 2024 Summer Olympics, he returned to Europe to play for Gantoise in Belgium.

== International career ==
=== Junior national team ===
In 2014, Casella made his debut for Argentina, representing the Under 18 national team at a qualifier for the 2014 Summer Youth Olympics. At the tournament, Argentina finished in first place, with Casella scoring 18 goals. He represented the junior national team at the Pan American Junior Championship in Toronto, Canada. At the tournament he scored 18 goals, helping Argentina to a gold medal and qualification to the Junior World Cup. Casella again represented Argentina at the Junior World Cup in Lucknow, India, where the team finished 5th.

=== Senior national team ===
Casella debuted for the senior national team in 2015, in a test series against the United States, in Boston. He was selected for the 2018 World Cup, where he played in all four games. In July 2019, he was selected in the Argentina squad for the 2019 Pan American Games. They won the gold medal by defeating Canada 5–2 in the final. He was the joint-topscorer of the competition with ten goals together with Leandro Tolini. In December 2019, he was nominated for the FIH Rising Star of the Year Award. On 25 June 2021, he was chosen to represent Argentina at the 2020 Summer Olympics.

== Honours ==
Gantoise

- Euro Hockey League: 2024–25

Argentina U21

- Pan American Junior Championship: 2016

Argentina

- Pan American Games gold medal: 2019, 2023
- Pan American Cup: 2017, 2022
