= Sebastian Castillo =

- Born: Caracas, Venezuela
- Citizenship: Venezuela, United States
- Education: Temple University (MFA), Manhattan College (BA)
- Occupations: poet; novelist
- Employer(s): Temple University, University of the Arts, Philadelphia, University of Pennsylvania
- Website: https://sebastian-castillo.com/

Sebastian Castillo is a Venezuelan and American writer and teacher. His 2025 novel Fresh, Green Life was the 2025 Los Angeles Review of Books Summer Book Club Pick.

== Early life and education ==
Castillo was born in Caracas, Venezuela, before his family emigrated to the United States. He grew up in Mount Vernon, New York, and later moved to Philadelphia.

Castillo studied English and Philosophy as an undergraduate at Manhattan College and then earned a MFA in Fiction from Temple University. He now teaches, or has taught at, Temple University, the University of Pennsylvania, University of the Arts, and Moore College of Art and Design.

== Career ==
Castillo has written for publications such as Electric Literature, JOYLAND, the New York Tyrant, and The New York Times. He was shortlisted for BOMB's Fiction Contest. Castillo's work has been described as autofictional and surrealist.

In The Oxonian Review, Marie Ungar describes Fresh, Green Life as a "parody of and love letter to academic life" grappling with the "worth of writing and thinking" given economic alienation and existential absurdity.

In 2025, his first book, 49 Venezuelan Novels, was translated into Spanish by the Mexican writer Elisa Díaz Castelo, for La barba metafísica.

== Works ==
- 49 Venezuelan Novels. Bottlecap Press, 2017.
- Not I. Word West, 2020.
- SALMON. Shabby Doll House, 2023.
- The Zoo of Thinking. Smooth Friend, 2024.
- Fresh, Green Life. Soft Skull, 2025.
