= Ernst Rost-Onnes =

Brazilian field hockey player (born 1985)

Ernst Rost Onnes
Personal information
- Born: 5 December 1985 (age 40) Amsterdam, Netherlands

Sport
- Country: Brazil
- Sport: Field hockey

Ernst Rost Onnes (born 5 December 1985) is a Dutch-born Brazilian field hockey player. He competed in the men's field hockey tournament at the 2016 Summer Olympics.
