= Joaquín Lopez (field hockey) =

Brazilian field hockey player (born 1990)

Personal information
- Full name: Joaquín Eduardo Lopez
- Born: 12 February 1990 (age 36) Neuquén, Argentina
- Height: 1.70 m (5 ft 7 in)
- Weight: 76 kg (168 lb)

Sport
- Sport: Field hockey
National team
| Years | Team | Caps | Goals |
| 2016–present | Brazil | 34 | - |
Medal record
Men's field hockey
Representing Brazil
South American Games
| Bronze medal – third place | 2018 Cochabamba | Team |

Joaquín Eduardo Lopez (born February 12, 1990) is a Brazilian field hockey player. He competed for the Brazil men's national field hockey team at the 2016 Summer Olympics.
