= Lucas Paixão =

Brazilian field hockey player (born 1994)

Personal information
- Full name: Lucas Moreira Duarte Paixão
- Born: 2 September 1994 (age 31)

Sport
- Sport: Field hockey
National team
Years	Team	Caps	Goals
2013–	Brazil	73	-
Medal record
Men's field hockey
Representing Brazil
South American Games
Bronze medal – third place	2018 Cochabamba	Team
South American Championship
Bronze medal – third place	2013 Santiago
- Updated on 26 March 2019

Lucas Moreira Duarte Paixão (born 2 September 1994) is a Brazilian field hockey player. He competed in the men's field hockey tournament at the 2016 Summer Olympics.
