= Adam Imer =

Brazilian field hockey player (born 1989)

Personal information
- Born: 18 August 1989 (age 36) Sydney, Australia
- Height: 1.82 m (6 ft 0 in)
- Weight: 88 kg (194 lb)

Sport
- Sport: Field hockey
National team
Years	Team	Caps	Goals
2016–2019	Brazil	26	-

Adam Imer (born 18 August 1989) is a Brazilian field hockey player. He competed in the men's field hockey tournament at the 2016 Summer Olympics.
