= André Patrocínio =

Brazilian field hockey player (born 1990)

Personal information
- Full name: André Luiz Patrocínio Couto
- Born: 20 February 1990 (age 36) Rio de Janeiro, Brazil
- Height: 1.73 m (5 ft 8 in)
- Weight: 74 kg (163 lb)

Sport
- Sport: Field hockey
Senior career
Years	Team	Caps	Goals
–	Rio	-	-
National team
Years	Team	Caps	Goals
–	Brazil	97	-
Medal record
Men's field hockey
Representing Brazil
South American Games
Bronze medal – third place	2018 Cochabamba	Team
South American Championship
Bronze medal – third place	2013 Santiago

André Patrocínio (born 20 February 1990) is a Brazilian field hockey player. He competed in the men's field hockey tournament at the 2016 Summer Olympics.
