= Patrick van der Heijden =

Brazilian field hockey player (born 1992)

Personal information
- Born: 19 September 1992 (age 33)

Sport
- Country: Brazil
- Sport: Field hockey

Patrick van der Heijden (born 19 September 1992) is a Brazilian field hockey player. He competed in the men's field hockey tournament at the 2016 Summer Olympics.
