= Stéphane Vehrle-Smith =

Brazilian field hockey player (born 1989)

Personal information
- Born: 15 May 1989 (age 37) Recife, Pernambuco, Brazil
- Height: 173 cm (5 ft 8 in)
- Weight: 70 kg (154 lb)

Sport
- Sport: Field hockey
National team
Years	Team	Caps	Goals
2013–present	Brazil		-
Medal record
Men's field hockey
Representing Brazil
South American Hockey Championship
Bronze medal – third place	2013 Santiago	Team
Pan American Challenge
Bronze medal – third place	2015 Chiclayo	Team

Stéphane Vehrle-Smith (born 15 May 1989) is a Brazilian field hockey player. He competed in the men's field hockey tournament at the 2016 Summer Olympics, 2017 Pan American Cup, 2015 Pan American Games, 2014 South American Games, 2014 World Hockey League, 2013 Pan American Cup and 2013 South American Championship.

== Results ==
Year	Event
2017	Pan American Cup
2016	Olympic Games
2015	Pan American Games
2014	South American Games
2014	World Hockey League
2013	Pan American Cup
2013	South American Championship
