= Field hockey at the South American Games =

- Upcoming season or competition: Field hockey at the 2026 South American Games
- Sport: Field hockey
- Founded: 2006; 20 years ago
- First season: 2006
- No. of teams: 8
- Continent: South America (PAHF)
- Most recent champions: M: Argentina (5th title); W: Argentina (4th title)
- Most titles: M: Argentina (5 titles); W: Argentina (4 titles)

Field hockey at the South American Games was first introduced to the South American Games as a men's and women's tournament at the 2006 Games.

After being introduced in the 2006 South American Games, the field hockey tournament was absent at the 2010 South American Games, but returned in 2014. The tournament often serves as a qualification tournament for the field hockey event at the Pan American Games.

In the men's competition, Argentina are the most successful national team, having won gold at every edition of the tournament. The Argentine women's team is also the most successful national team in the women's competition, also having won gold at every edition until 2022, when Chile became the first nation other than Argentina to win the gold medal.

== Men's tournament ==
=== Results ===
Year	Host	Gold medal match			Bronze medal match			Number of teams
Year	Host	Gold medal	Score	Silver medal	Bronze medal	Score	Fourth place	Number of teams
2006; Details	Buenos Aires, Argentina	Argentina	6–0	Chile	Peru	0–0 (3–0 s.o.)	Uruguay	5
2014; Details	Santiago, Chile	Argentina	8–1	Chile	Venezuela	3–2	Brazil	6
2018; Details	Cochabamba, Bolivia	Argentina	1–0	Chile	Brazil	2–2 (4–3 s.o.)	Venezuela	8
2022; Details	Asunción, Paraguay	Argentina	3–1	Chile	Brazil	5–0	Peru	7
2026; Details	Santa Fe, Argentina	Argentina	3–1	Chile	Uruguay	1–1 (3–2 s.o.)	Brazil	5

=== Summary ===
Team	Gold medal	Silver medal	Bronze medal	Fourth place
Argentina	5 (2006*, 2014, 2018, 2022, 2026*)			
Chile		5 (2006, 2014*, 2018, 2022, 2026)		
Brazil			2 (2018, 2022)	2 (2014, 2026)
Venezuela			1 (2014)	1 (2018)
Peru			1 (2006)	1 (2022)
Uruguay			1 (2026)	1 (2006)

* = hosts

=== Team appearances ===
Team	(Argentina) 2006	(Chile) 2014	(Bolivia) 2018	(Paraguay) 2022	(Argentina) 2026	Total
Argentina	1st	1st	1st	1st	1st	5
Bolivia	–	–	8th	7th	–	2
Brazil	5th	4th	3rd	3rd	4th	5
Chile	2nd	2nd	2nd	2nd	2nd	5
Paraguay	–	–	7th	6th	–	2
Peru	3rd	6th	5th	4th	5th	5
Uruguay	4th	5th	6th	5th	3rd	5
Venezuela	–	3rd	4th	–	–	3
Total	5	6	8	7	5	

== Women's tournament ==
=== Results ===
Year	Host	Gold medal match			Bronze medal match			Number of teams
Year	Host	Gold medal	Score	Silver medal	Bronze medal	Score	Fourth place	Number of teams
2006; Details	Buenos Aires, Argentina	Argentina	4–0	Chile	Uruguay	4–0	Brazil	4
2014; Details	Santiago, Chile	Argentina	3–1	Chile	Uruguay	3–0	Brazil	6
2018; Details	Cochabamba, Bolivia	Argentina	8–0	Uruguay	Chile	7–0	Brazil	7
2022; Details	Asunción, Paraguay	Chile	0–0 (3–2 s.o.)	Argentina	Uruguay	7–0	Paraguay	5
2026; Details	Santa Fe, Argentina	Argentina	5–0	Chile	Uruguay	9–0	Paraguay	5

=== Summary ===
Team	Gold medal	Silver medal	Bronze medal	Fourth place
Argentina	4 (2006*, 2014, 2018, 2026*)	1 (2022)		
Chile	1 (2022)	3 (2006, 2014*, 2026)	1 (2018)	
Uruguay		1 (2018)	4 (2006, 2014, 2022, 2026)	
Brazil				3 (2006, 2014, 2018)
Paraguay				2 (2022*, 2026)

* = hosts

=== Team appearances ===
Team	(Argentina) 2006	(Chile) 2014	(Bolivia) 2018	(Paraguay) 2022	(Argentina) 2026	Total
Argentina	1st	1st	1st	2nd	1st	5
Bolivia	–	–	6th	–	–	1
Brazil	4th	4th	4th	–	–	3
Chile	2nd	2nd	3rd	1st	2nd	5
Paraguay	–	5th	5th	4th	4th	4
Peru	–	–	7th	5th	5th	3
Uruguay	3rd	3rd	2nd	3rd	3rd	5
Venezuela	–	6th	–	–	–	1
Total	4	6	7	5	5	

== Medal table ==
=== Total ===
Rank	Nation	Gold	Silver	Bronze	Total
1	Argentina (ARG)	9	1	0	10
2	Chile (CHI)	1	8	1	10
3	Uruguay (URU)	0	1	5	6
4	Brazil (BRA)	0	0	2	2
5	Peru (PER)	0	0	1	1
5	Venezuela (VEN)	0	0	1	1
Totals (6 entries)		10	10	10	30

=== Men ===
Rank	Nation	Gold	Silver	Bronze	Total
1	Argentina	5	0	0	5
2	Chile	0	5	0	5
3	Brazil	0	0	2	2
4	Peru	0	0	1	1
4	Uruguay	0	0	1	1
4	Venezuela	0	0	1	1
Totals (6 entries)		5	5	5	15

=== Women ===
Rank	Nation	Gold	Silver	Bronze	Total
1	Argentina	4	1	0	5
2	Chile	1	3	1	5
3	Uruguay	0	1	4	5
Totals (3 entries)		5	5	5	15

== See also ==
- Men's South American Hockey Championship
- Women's South American Hockey Championship
