= Men's Pan American Cup (field hockey) =

International field hockey competition

- Current season, competition or edition: 2025 Men's Pan American Cup
- Sport: Field hockey
- Founded: 2000; 26 years ago
- First season: 2000
- No. of teams: 8
- Confederation: PAHF (Americas)
- Most recent champion: Argentina (5th title) (2025)
- Most titles: Argentina (5 titles)
- Qualification: Pan American Challenge
- Related competitions: Pan American Games

The Men's Pan American Cup is a men's international field hockey competition organised by the Pan American Hockey Federation. The winning team becomes the champion of the Americas and qualifies for the FIH Hockey World Cup.

Argentina has won the tournament four times. Canada and Cuba have both won the tournament once.

The hosts together with six highest-ranked teams from the previous edition are qualified directly for the tournament, they are joined by the top team from the Men's Pan American Challenge or the top two teams if the host is already qualified.

== Results ==
| Year | Host | Final | | | Third place match | | | Number of teams |
| Year | Host | Winner | Score | Runner-up | Third place | Score | Fourth place | Number of teams |
|---|---|---|---|---|---|---|---|---|
| 2000; Details | Havana, Cuba | Cuba | 2–1 | Canada | Argentina | 8–0 | Chile | 11 |
| 2004; Details | London, Canada | Argentina | 2–1 | Canada | Chile | 2–1 | Trinidad and Tobago | 11 |
| 2009; Details | Santiago, Chile | Canada | 2–1 (a.e.t.) | United States | Argentina | 4–0 | Chile | 8 |
| 2013; Details | Brampton, Canada | Argentina | 4–0 | Canada | Trinidad and Tobago | 3–1 | United States | 8 |
| 2017; Details | Lancaster, United States | Argentina | 2–0 | Canada | United States | 3–0 | Trinidad and Tobago | 8 |
| 2022; Details | Santiago, Chile | Argentina | 5–1 | Chile | Canada | 3–1 | United States | 7 |
| 2025; Details | Montevideo, Uruguay | Argentina | 10–0 | United States | Canada | 2–1 | Chile | 8 |

=== Summary ===
| Team | Winners | Runners-up | Third place | Fourth place |
|---|---|---|---|---|
| Argentina | 5 (2004, 2013, 2017, 2022, 2025) | | 2 (2000, 2009) | |
| Canada | 1 (2009) | 4 (2000, 2004*, 2013*, 2017) | 2 (2022, 2025) | |
| Cuba | 1 (2000*) | | | |
| United States | | 2 (2009, 2025) | 1 (2017*) | 2 (2013, 2022) |
| Chile | | 1 (2022*) | 1 (2004) | 3 (2000, 2009*, 2025) |
| Trinidad and Tobago | | | 1 (2013) | 2 (2004, 2017) |

* = hosts

=== Team appearances ===
| Nation | (Cuba) 2000 | (Canada) 2004 | (Chile) 2009 | (Canada) 2013 | (United States) 2017 | (Chile) 2022 | (Uruguay) 2025 | Total |
|---|---|---|---|---|---|---|---|---|
| Argentina | 3rd | 1st | 3rd | 1st | 1st | 1st | 1st | 7 |
| Barbados | 9th | – | – | – | – | – | – | 1 |
| Brazil | – | 10th | 7th | 7th | 5th | 6th | 6th | 6 |
| Canada | 2nd | 2nd | 1st | 2nd | 2nd | 3rd | 3rd | 7 |
| Chile | 4th | 3rd | 4th | 5th | 6th | 2nd | 4th | 7 |
| Cuba | 1st | – | – | – | – | – | – | 1 |
| Jamaica | 11th | – | – | – | – | – | – | 1 |
| Mexico | 7th | 6th | 6th | 6th | 7th | 5th | 5th | 7 |
| Netherlands Antilles | – | 5th | – | Defunct | | | | 1 |
| Peru | 8th | – | – | – | – | WD | – | 1 |
| Puerto Rico | 6th | 8th | – | – | – | – | – | 2 |
| Trinidad and Tobago | – | 4th | 5th | 3rd | 4th | 7th | WD | 5 |
| United States | 5th | 7th | 2nd | 4th | 3rd | 4th | 2nd | 7 |
| Uruguay | – | 9th | 8th | 8th | – | – | 7th | 4 |
| Venezuela | 10th | 11th | – | – | 8th | – | – | 3 |
| Total | 11 | 11 | 8 | 8 | 8 | 7 | 8 | |

== See also ==
- Field hockey at the Pan American Games
- Men's Indoor Pan American Cup
- Men's Pan American Challenge
- Men's Junior Pan American Cup
- Women's Pan American Cup
