= Yuri van der Heijden =

Brazilian field hockey player (born 1990)

Personal information
- Nicknames: Yurinho, De Natte, JeWeetWelWie
- Nationality: Dutch / Brazilian
- Born: 20 July 1990 (age 36)
- Height: 1.76
- Weight: 77

Sport
- Country: Brazil
- Sport: Field hockey
- Club: Royal Victory Hockey Club (Antwerp, Belgium)

Yuri van der Heijden (born 20 July 1990) is a Brazilian field hockey player. He competed in the men's field hockey tournament at the 2016 Summer Olympics.
