= Field hockey at the 2015 Pan American Games – Men's team rosters =

This article shows the rosters of all participating teams at the men's field hockey tournament at the 2015 Pan American Games in Toronto. Rosters can have a maximum of 16 athletes.

== Pool A ==
=== Argentina ===
The following is Argentina's men's field hockey squad for the 2015 Pan American Games.

Head Coach: Carlos Retegui

1. Juan Manuel Vivaldi
2. Gonzalo Peillat
4. Juan Gilardi
5. Pedro Ibarra
7. Facundo Callioni
10. Matías Paredes
11. Joaquin Menini
12. Lucas Vila
16. Ignacio Ortiz
17. Juan Martín López
19. Nicolas Della Torre
20. Isidoro Ibarra
22. Matias Rey
24. Manuel Brunet
26. Agustin Mazzili
27. Lucas Rossi

=== Cuba ===
Head Coach: Guillermo Stakeman

1. Leordan Hernandez (GK)
2. Yendry Delgado (GK)
3. Alexander Abreu
4. Dani Alonso
7. Vladimir Prado
8. Darian Valero
9. Reynaldo Gonzalez
11. Yoandy Blanco
12. Maikel Tritzant
13. Raidel Ortiz
14. Yoel Veitia
15. Minel Mrado
16. Roger Aguilera (c)
17. Adrian Molina
18. Marcos Martinez
20. Yasmany Gutierrez

=== Trinidad and Tobago ===
The following is Trinidad and Tobago's men's field hockey squad for the 2015 Pan American Games.

Head Coach: Glen Francis

3. Christopher Scipio
4. Aidan de Gannes
5. Kiel Murray
6. Solomon Eccles
8. Stefan Mouttet
9. Akim Toussaint
11. Dillet Gilkes
12. Ishmael Campbell
14. Darren Cowie
18. Mickel Pierre
19. Shaquille Daniel
20. Jordan Reynos
21. Tariq Marcano
22. Kristien Emmanuel
23. Andrey Rocke
24. Dominic Young

=== United States ===
Head Coach: Chris Clements

3. Michael Barminski
4. Tyler Sundeen
5. Patrick Harris (c)
6. Alex Grassi
9. Adam Miller
11. William Holt (c)
12. Ajai Dhadwal
14. Tom Barratt
17. Christian Linney
19. Moritz Runzi
21. Ranjot Sangha
22. Johnny Orozco
25. Alexander Cunningham
26. Mohan Gandhi
29. Aki Kaeppeler
30. Christopher Rea (GK)

== Pool B ==
=== Brazil ===
Brazil announced their squad on June 15, 2015.

- André Luiz Couto
- Bruno Paes
- Bruno Mendonça
- Bruno Sousa
- Christopher McPherson
- Lucas Paixão
- Luis Felipe Réus
- Marcos Pasin
- Matheus Ferreira
- Patrick Van der Heijden
- Paul Duncker
- Paulo Roberto Junior
- Rodrigo Faustino
- Stephane Smith
- Thiago Dantas
- Yuri Van der Heijden

=== Canada ===
Canada announced their squad on June 25, 2015.

- Brenden Bissett
- David Carter
- Taylor Curran
- Adam Froese
- Matthew Guest
- Gabriel Ho-Garcia
- David Jameson
- Gordon Johnston
- Ben Martin
- Devohn Noronha-Teixeira
- Sukhi Panesar
- Mark Pearson
- Matthew Sarmento
- Iain Smythe
- Scott Tupper
- Paul Wharton

=== Chile ===
- Richardo Achondo
- Prada A. Berczely
- Fernando Binder Wiener
- Felipe Eggers
- Andres Fuenzalida
- Ignacio Gajardo
- Adrian Henriquez
- Thomas Kannegiesser
- Seba Kapsch
- Vicente Martin Tarud
- Fernando Renz
- Nicolas Renz
- Sven Richter
- Martin Rodriguez Ducaud
- Raimundo Valenzuela
- Jaime Zarhi

=== Mexico ===
- Francisco Aguilar
- Edgar Borquez Silva
- Alexis Campillo Lopez
- Daniel Castillo Ortiz
- Irvin Chavez Gomez
- Edgar Garcia Lopez
- Roberto Garcia Lopez
- Ricardo Garcia Miranda
- Jose Hernandez
- Ruben Martinez Munive
- Pol Moreno Quiroz
- Miguel Othon Moreno
- Guillermo Pedraza Saenz
- Bruno Peraza Garcia
- Moises Vargas Garcia
- Argenis Vasquez Garcia
