= 2018–19 Men's Hockey Series Open =

International field hockey competition

Tournament details
- Dates: 5 June – 22 December 2018
- Teams: 46 (from 5 confederations)
- Venue: 9 (in 9 host cities)

Tournament statistics
- Matches played: 103
- Goals scored: 819 (7.95 per match)
- Top scorer: (Mexico) Francisco Aguilar (16 goals)

The 2018–19 Men's Hockey Series Open was an international field hockey competition, serving as the first stage of the 2018–19 edition of the Hockey Series. It was held from June to December 2018.

== Salamanca ==
Hockey Series Open Salamanca
Tournament details
- Host country: Mexico
- City: Salamanca
- Dates: 5–10 June
- Teams: 5
- Venue: Cancha de Hockey Siglo XXI

Final positions
- Champions: United States
- Runner-up: Mexico
- Third place: Puerto Rico

Tournament statistics
- Matches played: 10
- Goals scored: 115 (11.5 per match)
- Top scorer: (Mexico) Francisco Aguilar (16 goals)

=== Pool ===
Pos	Team	Pld	W	D	L	GF	GA	GD	Pts	Qualification
1	United States	4	3	1	0	54	5	+49	10	Hockey Series Finals
2	Mexico (H)	4	3	1	0	48	6	+42	10	Hockey Series Finals
3	Puerto Rico	4	2	0	2	11	22	−11	6	
4	Panama	4	1	0	3	2	37	−35	3	
5	Costa Rica	4	0	0	4	0	45	−45	0	

Source: FIH
Rules for classification: 1) points; 2) matches won; 3) goal difference; 4) goals for; 5) head-to-head result; 6) field goals for.
(H) Hosts

All times are local (UTC−6).

=== Results ===
5 June 2018
10:30

Puerto Rico	4–0	Panama
Rodríguez 9'; Monserrate 24'; Cabrera 44'; Melendez 58'	Report

Umpires:
Andrés Ledesma (ARG)
Andrey Umana (CRC)

5 June 2018
12:30

Mexico	18–0	Costa Rica
Palma 9', 49', 56'; Aguilar 13', 15', 27', 28', 35', 45', 52'; Villegas 20'; M. Méndez 25'; Rangel 27', 34'; Pedraza 29'; Y. Méndez 33', 46'; García 33'	Report

Umpires:
Gabriel Labate (ARG)
Nathaniel Fuentes (PAN)

6 June 2018
11:00

United States	19–0	Costa Rica
Sundeen 3', 7'; Käppeler 11', 45+', 46', 49'; Dhadwal 12', 37'; Grassi 13', 17', 50'; Holt 19', 36'; Huisman 27', 38', 44'; Orozco 35'; Kentwell 39'; DeAngelis 51'	Report

Umpires:
Eduardo Islas (MEX)
Nathaniel Fuentes (PAN)

6 June 2018
13:00

Mexico	11–0	Panama
Pedraza 4', 59'; Terminel 12'; Aguilar 23', 41'; Rangel 29'; Villegas 32'; Martínez 33'; García 44'; Y. Méndez 50'; M. Méndez 52'	Report

Umpires:
Ridge Bair (USA)
Andrey Umana (CRC)

7 June 2018
15:00

Puerto Rico	0–8	United States
	Report	Käppeler 6', 44'; DeAngelis 10'; Kentwell 32', 60'; Huisman 34'; Grassi 35'; Orozco 57'

Umpires:
Gabriel Labate (ARG)
Andrés Ledesma (ARG)

8 June 2018
15:00

Panama	2–0	Costa Rica
Martínez 34'; Correa 50'	Report

Umpires:
Ridge Bair (USA)
Eduardo Islas (MEX)

9 June 2018
15:00

Costa Rica	0–6	Puerto Rico
	Report	Melendez 11', 40'; Rodríguez 24', 38'; Monserrate 33'; Agosto 49'

Umpires:
Ridge Bair (USA)
Eduardo Islas (MEX)

9 June 2018
17:00

Mexico	5–5	United States
Aguilar 10', 21', 35'; García 12'; Villegas 33'	Report	Huisman 15'; Grassi 25'; Kentwell 35'; Dhadwal 39'; Holt 40'

Umpires:
Gabriel Labate (ARG)
Andrés Ledesma (ARG)

10 June 2018
15:00

United States	22–0	Panama
Käppeler 2', 4', 17', 18', 23', 27', 41'; Singh 4', 13', 20', 25', 31', 54'; Huisman 26', 30', 58'; Dhadwal 30'; Grassi 36', 50'; Sundeen 42'; DeAngelis 48'; Barratt 54'	Report

Umpires:
Andrey Umana (CRC)
Gabriel Labate (ARG)

10 June 2018
17:00

Puerto Rico	1–14	Mexico
Agosto 13'	Report	Aguilar 4', 17', 37', 53'; Martínez 6'; García 13'; Villegas 16', 51'; Pedraza 20', 28', 45'; Rangel 25'; González 56', 60'

Umpires:
Ridge Bair (USA)
Andrés Ledesma (ARG)

== Singapore ==
Hockey Series Open Singapore
Tournament details
- Host country: Singapore
- Dates: 23 June–1 July
- Teams: 6
- Venue: Seng Kang Sports Club

Final positions
- Champions: Singapore
- Runner-up: Thailand
- Third place: Chinese Taipei

Tournament statistics
- Matches played: 18
- Goals scored: 119 (6.61 per match)
- Top scorer(s): (Singapore) Ahmad Johari (Thailand) Thanakrit Boon-Art (8 goals)

=== Pool ===
Pos	Team	Pld	W	D	L	GF	GA	GD	Pts	Qualification
1	Singapore (H)	5	5	0	0	23	3	+20	15	Final
2	Thailand	5	4	0	1	19	9	+10	12	Final
3	Chinese Taipei	5	3	0	2	20	13	+7	9	Third place game
4	Myanmar	5	2	0	3	20	14	+6	6	Third place game
5	Hong Kong	5	1	0	4	10	22	−12	3	Fifth place game
6	Indonesia	5	0	0	5	1	32	−31	0	Fifth place game

Source: FIH
Rules for classification: 1) points; 2) matches won; 3) goal difference; 4) goals for; 5) head-to-head result; 6) field goals for.
(H) Hosts

All times are local (UTC+8).

=== Results ===
23 June 2018
16:30

Hong Kong	2–6	Myanmar
Iu 16'; Chan A. 24'	Report	Sa 19'; Htwe 19', 39', 50'; Tun 34'; Lin 57'

Umpires:
Hari Manikandan (IND)
Saifulnizam Seftu (SGP)

23 June 2018
18:30

Thailand	3–1	Chinese Taipei
Kampanthong 27'; Yosiri 43'; Boon-Art 58'	Report	Hsieh T. 11'

Umpires:
Kamran Hussain (PAK)
Khaeriva Hasani (INA)

23 June 2018
19:00

Singapore	7–0	Indonesia
Vijayan 9', 53', 55'; Zul'Kepli 15+', 33', 48'; Noor Shah 26'	Report

Umpires:
Khalil Al-Balushi (OMA)
Puvalagan Paskaran (MAS)

24 June 2018
17:30

Hong Kong	2–5	Chinese Taipei
Ho 32'; Yu 49'	Report	Huang P. 13'; Lu 15'; Hsieh T. 23'; Chang Chia-w. 46'; Yu Ch. 51'

Umpires:
Narongtuch Subboonsong (THA)
Khaeriva Hasani (INA)

24 June 2018
19:00

Singapore	2–0	Myanmar
Johari 6', 51'	Report

Umpires:
Puvalagan Paskaran (MAS)
Hari Manikandan (IND)

24 June 2018
19:30

Indonesia	0–6	Thailand
	Report	Boon-Art 8', 12'; Samoechai 11'; Yosiri 38'; Khamkong 57'; Harapan 57'

Umpires:
Ravdeep Sethi (HKG)
Kamran Hussain (PAK)

26 June 2018
15:30

Indonesia	0–3	Hong Kong
	Report	Iu 29', 40'; Tsoi 59'

Umpires:
Hari Manikandan (IND)
Zarni Aung (MYA)

26 June 2018
16:00

Chinese Taipei	5–4	Myanmar
Huang P. 6'; Lu 7'; Chang Che. 9'; Chang Chia-w. 14'; Shih 59'	Report	Aung N. 5', 45'; Ni 32'; Htwe 36'

Umpires:
Saifulnizam Seftu (SGP)
Puvalagan Paskaran (MAS)

26 June 2018
18:00

Thailand	1–4	Singapore
Samoechai 35'	Report	Vijayan 6'; Johari 17', 32'; Teo 57'

Umpires:
Kamran Hussain (PAK)
Ravdeep Sethi (HKG)

27 June 2018
15:30

Chinese Taipei	9–0	Indonesia
Chang Che. 7', 24'; Li 27'; Huang T. 31', 48', 56'; Lu 43'; Hsieh T. 47'; Shih 48'	Report

Umpires:
Zarni Aung (MYA)
Narongtuch Subboonsong (THA)

27 June 2018
16:00

Myanmar	3–4	Thailand
Aung T. 38'; Shane 42'; Ni 47'	Report	Juntakian 12'; Boon-Art 18', 24'; Yosiri 30+'

Umpires:
Kamran Hussain (PAK)
Ravdeep Sethi (HKG)

27 June 2018
18:00

Hong Kong	2–6	Singapore
Shepherdson 31'; Monthong 39'	Report	Kahar 19'; Noor Shah 28', 43', 60'; Johari 32', 37'

Umpires:
Puvalagan Paskaran (MAS)
Hari Manikandan (IND)

29 June 2018
17:30

Myanmar	7–1	Indonesia
Htwe 10', 50'; Tun 16'; Sa 24', 26'; Ni 47'; Wai 52'	Report	Kastalani 51'

Umpires:
Kamran Hussain (PAK)
Puvalagan Paskaran (MAS)

29 June 2018
19:30

Thailand	5–1	Hong Kong
Yosiri 5'; Samoechai 34'; Boon-Art 35', 52'; Boonmee 53'	Report	Yu 22'

Umpires:
Khaeriva Hasani (INA)
Saifulnizam Seftu (SGP)

29 June 2018
20:00

Singapore	4–0	Chinese Taipei
Zul'Kepli 9'; Noor Shah 22'; Teo 29'; Kahar 39'	Report

Umpires:
Ravdeep Sethi (HKG)
Narongtuch Subboonsong (THA)

==== Fifth place game ====
1 July 2018
17:30

Hong Kong	13–0	Indonesia
Yu 1', 19', 19', 20'; Ho 8'; Iu 22'; Chan A. 22', 49'; Tsoi 25'; Tsang 40'; Monthong 41'; Shepherdson 44', 58'	Report

Umpires:
Narongtuch Subboonsong (THA)
Hari Manikandan (IND)

==== Third place game ====
30 June 2018
19:00

Chinese Taipei	6–2	Myanmar
Chang Chia-m. 9'; Lu 32', 38'; Huang P. 41'; Li 55'; Yu Chu. 59'	Report	Aung N. 36'; Shane 60'

Umpires:
Kamran Hussain (PAK)
Saifulnizam Seftu (SGP)

==== Final ====
1 July 2018
18:00

Singapore	4–1	Thailand
Zul'Kepli 7'; Johari 17', 33'; Teo 51'	Report	Boon-Art 40'

Umpires:
Ravdeep Sethi (HKG)
Puvalagan Paskaran (MAS)

=== Final ranking ===
Qualified for the Hockey Series Finals

Rank	Team
1	Singapore
2	Thailand
3	Chinese Taipei
4	Myanmar
5	Hong Kong
6	Indonesia

== Zagreb ==
Hockey Series Open Zagreb
Tournament details
- Host country: Croatia
- City: Zagreb
- Dates: 25–30 June
- Teams: 5
- Venue: Sports Park Mladost

Final positions
- Champions: Austria
- Runner-up: Wales
- Third place: Croatia

Tournament statistics
- Matches played: 10
- Goals scored: 68 (6.8 per match)
- Top scorer: (Austria) Michael Körper (10 goals)

=== Pool ===
Pos	Team	Pld	W	D	L	GF	GA	GD	Pts	Qualification
1	Austria	4	4	0	0	29	3	+26	12	Hockey Series Finals
2	Wales	4	3	0	1	22	5	+17	9	Hockey Series Finals
3	Croatia (H)	4	2	0	2	10	13	−3	6	
4	Switzerland	4	1	0	3	3	18	−15	3	
5	Slovakia	4	0	0	4	4	29	−25	0	

Source: FIH
Rules for classification: 1) points; 2) matches won; 3) goal difference; 4) goals for; 5) head-to-head result; 6) field goals for.
(H) Hosts

All times are local (UTC+2).

=== Results ===
25 June 2018
17:30

Wales	6–1	Slovakia
Furlong 6', 44'; Draper 10'; Francis 22'; Bradshaw 39'; Shipperley 50'	Report	Romanec 48'

Umpires:
Łukasz Zwierzchowski (POL)
Ivan Grgurev (CRO)

25 June 2018
19:30

Switzerland	0–2	Croatia
	Report	Ilinović 12', 36'

Umpires:
Michal Pivko (SVK)
Kevin Roberts (WAL)

26 June 2018
17:30

Slovakia	1–2	Switzerland
Romanec 55'	Report	Landtwing 35'; Knabenhans 45'

Umpires:
Friedrich Weiland (AUT)
Ivan Grgurev (CRO)

26 June 2018
19:30

Austria	3–0	Wales
Uher 15'; Körper 42', 55'	Report

Umpires:
Michal Pivko (SVK)
Łukasz Zwierzchowski (POL)

27 June 2018
19:30

Austria	3–2	Croatia
Körper 21', 34'; Bele 26'	Report	Bachmann 38'; Krleža 41'

Umpires:
Kevin Roberts (WAL)
Michal Pivko (SVK)

28 June 2018
19:30

Switzerland	1–7	Wales
Knabenhans 6'	Report	Francis 2', 35', 58'; Furlong 39', 43', 49'; Dolan-Gray 49'

Umpires:
Friedrich Weiland (AUT)
Łukasz Zwierzchowski (POL)

29 June 2018
19:00

Switzerland	0–8	Austria
	Report	Podpera 8'; Körper 21', 56'; Thörnblom 30', 57'; Binder 39'; Lindengrün 43', 43'

Umpires:
Ivan Grgurev (CRO)
Michal Pivko (SVK)

29 June 2018
21:00

Croatia	6–1	Slovakia
Mucić 10'; Bachmann 23', 54'; Krleža 33', 48'; Žlimen 36'	Report	Orolin 45'

Umpires:
Kevin Roberts (WAL)
Friedrich Weiland (AUT)

30 June 2018
16:35

Austria	15–1	Slovakia
Stanzl 7', 33', 50', 52'; Unterkircher 8', 10', 40'; Körper 19', 33', 38', 46'; Eitenberger 48'; Minar 57'; Uher 58'; Podpera 58'	Report	Petráš 55'

Umpires:
Kevin Roberts (WAL)
Ivan Grgurev (CRO)

30 June 2018
18:30

Wales	9–0	Croatia
Furlong 3', 19', 38', 44'; Dolan-Gray 6', 40'; Francis 40', 48'; Bradshaw 54'	Report

Umpires:
Łukasz Zwierzchowski (POL)
Friedrich Weiland (AUT)

== Port Vila ==
Hockey Series Open Port Vila
Tournament details
- Host country: Vanuatu
- City: Port Vila
- Dates: 15–18 August
- Teams: 4
- Venue: Port Vila Hockey

Final positions
- Champions: Vanuatu
- Runner-up: Fiji
- Third place: Solomon Islands

Tournament statistics
- Matches played: 8
- Goals scored: 80 (10 per match)
- Top scorer: (Fiji) Krristofer Mock (14 goals)

Matches were played in a Hockey5s format.

=== Pool ===
Pos	Team	Pld	W	D	L	GF	GA	GD	Pts	Qualification
1	Vanuatu (H)	3	3	0	0	26	8	+18	9	Final
2	Fiji	3	2	0	1	28	9	+19	6	Final
3	Solomon Islands	3	1	0	2	11	18	−7	3	Third place game
4	Tonga	3	0	0	3	1	31	−30	0	Third place game

Source: FIH
Rules for classification: 1) points; 2) matches won; 3) goal difference; 4) goals for; 5) head-to-head result; 6) field goals for.
(H) Hosts

All times are local (UTC+11).

=== Results ===
15 August 2018
09:00

Tonga	1–6	Solomon Islands
Vatuvei 15'	Report	Levo 5', 8', 18', 27'; Suimae 16'; Fula'au 19'

Umpires:
Frank Vira (VAN)
Malkom Mayoho (VAN)

15 August 2018
15:00

Vanuatu	8–3	Solomon Islands
Sam 9'; Namu 15', 27'; Kawel 18', 28'; Job 19'; Iasi 24'; Johnas 29'	Report	Fula'au 11', 22', 25'

Umpires:
Harry Heritage (FIJ)
Catherine Thaggard (FIJ)

16 August 2018
11:00

Tonga	0–14	Fiji
	Report	Veitamana 1', 7', 21', 27', 28'; Morris 3', 20'; Underwood 10'; Mock 12', 12', 13', 20', 25', 26'

Umpires:
Nick Saunders (NZL)
Frank Vira (VAN)

16 August 2018
16:00

Vanuatu	7–5	Fiji
Kawel 1'; Namu 4', 29'; Iasi 10', 12'; Johnas 15'; Sam 19'	Report	Veitamana 2', 18', 26'; Morris 25'; Mock 29'

Umpires:
Nick Saunders (NZL)
Samson Auga (SOL)

17 August 2018
09:00

Fiji	9–2	Solomon Islands
Mock 2', 4', 12', 21'; Ratubuli 8'; Veitamana 14', 23'; Vatubuli 16'; Morris 26'	Report	Fula'Au 10'; Masae 14'

Umpires:
Frank Vira (VAN)
Malkom Mayoho (VAN)

17 August 2018
10:00

Tonga	0–11	Vanuatu
	Report	Iasi 3', 8', 14'; Kawel 4', 30'; Johnas 17', 19', 29'; Sam 24', 28'; Job 30'

Umpires:
Nick Saunders (NZL)
Harry Heritage (FIJ)

==== Third place game ====
18 August 2018
13:00

Solomon Islands	4–0	Tonga
Fula'au 12'; Levo 18'; Masae 20'; Luiramo 25'	Report

Umpires:
Harry Heritage (FIJ)
Malkom Mayoho (VAN)

==== Final ====
18 August 2018
14:00

Vanuatu	6–4	Fiji
Sam 9', 22'; Namu 10', 30'; Kawel 13'; Iasi 23'	Report	Mock 5', 9', 18'; Rokotakala 27'

Umpires:
Nick Saunders (NZL)
Samson Auga (SOL)

=== Final ranking ===
Qualified for the Hockey Series Finals

Rank	Team
1	Vanuatu
2	Fiji
3	Solomon Islands
4	Tonga

== Gniezno ==
Hockey Series Open Gniezno
Tournament details
- Host country: Poland
- City: Gniezno
- Dates: 28 August–2 September
- Teams: 6
- Venue: Alfonsa Flinika Hockey Stadium

Final positions
- Champions: Poland
- Runner-up: Italy
- Third place: Ukraine

Tournament statistics
- Matches played: 15
- Goals scored: 127 (8.47 per match)
- Top scorer: (Ukraine) Viacheslav Paziuk (9 goals)

=== Pool ===
Pos	Team	Pld	W	D	L	GF	GA	GD	Pts	Qualification
1	Poland (H)	5	4	1	0	32	0	+32	13	Hockey Series Finals
2	Italy	5	3	2	0	30	4	+26	11	Hockey Series Finals
3	Ukraine	5	3	1	1	42	6	+36	10	
4	Czech Republic	5	2	0	3	20	15	+5	6	
5	Lithuania	5	1	0	4	3	37	−34	3	
6	Cyprus	5	0	0	5	0	65	−65	0	

Source: FIH
Rules for classification: 1) points; 2) matches won; 3) goal difference; 4) goals for; 5) head-to-head result; 6) field goals for.
(H) Hosts

All times are local (UTC+2).

=== Results ===
28 August 2018
15:00

Czech Republic	3–4	Italy
Procházka 10'; Železný 26'; Uhliŕ 57'	Report	Nunez 2'; Lago 7', 39'; Da Gai 42'

Umpires:
Gavin Cruickshanks (SCO)
Jaroslav Suchocki (LTU)

28 August 2018
17:00

Ukraine	11–1	Lithuania
Kalinchuk 1'; Onofriiuk 3', 36'; Kovalenko 20'; Shevchuk 24'; Paziuk 31'; Dzekukh 32'; Polishchuk 45', 52', 53'; Yakovenko 53'	Report	Varnas 50'

Umpires:
Michael Pontus (BEL)
Alexandr Tóth (CZE)

28 August 2018
19:00

Poland	17–0	Cyprus
Bratkowski 2', 31'; Janiszewski 3', 52'; Hillyer 4'; Gumny 8', 26', 49'; Hulbój 10', 27', 53'; Pawlak 13'; Kurowski 28'; Kotulski 30', 44'; Kasprzyk 41'; Żywiczka 50'	Report

Umpires:
Maksym Perepelytsya (UKR)
Antonio Ilgrande (ITA)

29 August 2018
15:00

Ukraine	1–1	Italy
Onofriiuk 35'	Report	Amorosini 30'

Umpires:
Alexandr Tóth (CZE)
Łukasz Zwierzchowski (POL)

29 August 2018
17:00

Cyprus	0–10	Czech Republic
	Report	Tomeš 10'; Bodnár 13'; Seeman 15', 21'; Vohnický 18', 30', 34'; Plochý 19'; Bárta 49'; Uhlíř 58'

Umpires:
Gavin Cruickshanks (SCO)
Maksym Perepelytsya (UKR)

29 August 2018
19:00

Lithuania	0–11	Poland
	Report	Bratkowski 3', 24'; Krokosz 8'; Kotulski 10', 39', 43', 51'; Janiszewski 29', 50'; Pawlak 34'; Kurowski 55'

Umpires:
Antonio Ilgrande (ITA)
Michael Pontus (BEL)

30 August 2018
15:00

Cyprus	0–21	Ukraine
	Report	Kovalenko 3', 11'; Paziuk 5', 21', 25', 25', 26', 44', 52'; Shevchuk 11', 45'; Kalinchuk 12', 27', 29', 40'; Onofriiuk 14', 29'; Yasinskyi 20'; Polishchuk 32', 50'; Zinevych 49'

Umpires:
Jaroslav Suchocki (LTU)
Alexandr Tóth (CZE)

30 August 2018
17:00

Italy	10–0	Lithuania
Keenan 1', 13', 57'; Lago 7'; Corsi 34', 42'; Amorosini 34'; Montone 40'; Sior 41'; Nunez 54'	Report

Umpires:
Gavin Cruickshanks (SCO)
Łukasz Zwierzchowski (POL)

30 August 2018
19:00

Czech Republic	0–2	Poland
	Report	Bratkowski 11'; Kotulski 53'

Umpires:
Maksym Perepelytsya (UKR)
Michael Pontus (BEL)

1 September 2018
15:00

Lithuania	0–5	Czech Republic
	Report	Bárta 15', 55'; Plochý 36'; Vohnický 50'; Hanus 55'

Umpires:
Michael Pontus (BEL)
Łukasz Zwierzchowski (POL)

1 September 2018
17:00

Italy	15–0	Cyprus
Nunez 2', 18', 26', 48', 49', 54'; Lago 3'; Sior 10'; Montone 13', 42', 42', 45'; Ortega 16'; Amorosini 25'; Keenan 60'	Report

Umpires:
Jaroslav Suchocki (LTU)
Alexandr Tóth (CZE)

1 September 2018
19:00

Ukraine	0–2	Poland
	Report	Bratkowski 12'; Hulbój 48'

Umpires:
Antonio Ilgrande (ITA)
Gavin Cruickshanks (SCO)

2 September 2018
15:00

Lithuania	2–0	Cyprus
Bubnelis 28', 59'	Report

Umpires:
Gavin Cruickshanks (SCO)
Maksym Perepelytsya (UKR)

2 September 2018
17:00

Czech Republic	2–9	Ukraine
Železný 21'; Bodnár 45'	Report	Paziuk 11'; Kovalenko 12', 41', 59'; Onofriiuk 27', 33', 33'; Nosenko 31'; Shevchuk 35'

Umpires:
Antonio Ilgrande (ITA)
Łukasz Zwierzchowski (POL)

2 September 2018
19:00

Poland	0–0	Italy
	Report

Umpires:
Michael Pontus (BEL)
Jaroslav Suchocki (LTU)

== Lousada ==
Hockey Series Open Lousada
Tournament details
- Host country: Portugal
- City: Lousada
- Dates: 4–9 September
- Teams: 6
- Venue: AD Lousada

Final positions
- Champions: Russia
- Runner-up: Scotland
- Third place: Belarus

Tournament statistics
- Matches played: 15
- Goals scored: 99 (6.6 per match)
- Top scorer: (Russia) Marat Khairullin (8 goals)

=== Pool ===
Pos	Team	Pld	W	D	L	GF	GA	GD	Pts	Qualification
1	Russia	5	4	1	0	41	5	+36	13	Hockey Series Finals
2	Scotland	5	4	0	1	16	6	+10	12	Hockey Series Finals
3	Belarus	5	3	1	1	15	11	+4	10	
4	Gibraltar	5	1	1	3	8	15	−7	4	
5	Portugal (H)	5	1	1	3	9	23	−14	4	
6	Turkey	5	0	0	5	10	39	−29	0	

Source: FIH
Rules for classification: 1) points; 2) matches won; 3) goal difference; 4) goals for; 5) head-to-head result; 6) field goals for.
(H) Hosts

All times are local (UTC+1).

=== Results ===
4 September 2018
12:30

Russia	5–0	Gibraltar
Golubev 18'; Matkovskiy 34'; Shchipachev 50'; Gilev 55'; Zamalutdinov 59'	Report

Umpires:
Sean Edwards (ENG)
Sinan Acar (TUR)

4 September 2018
14:30

Scotland	7–2	Turkey
Golden 3', 4', 36'; White 19', 33', 50'; Duke 40'	Report	Demirel 45'; Karakuş 53'

Umpires:
Paul van den Assum (NED)
Paulo Lima (POR)

4 September 2018
16:30

Belarus	2–1	Portugal
Belavusau 20'; Lutsevich 60'	Report	Marques 24'

Umpires:
Lewis White (SCO)
Anton Kochin (RUS)

5 September 2018
12:30

Russia	17–1	Turkey
Matkovskiy 4', 25', 28'; Khairullin 7', 30'; Shchipachev 19', 41'; Laptev 19', 30'; Kornilov 23', 52', 60'; Gilev 39'; Zheleznyakov 43'; Golubev 44'; Kuraev 56'; Proskuriakov 59'	Report	Erman 47'

Umpires:
Andrei Saroka (BLR)
Lewis White (SCO)

5 September 2018
14:30

Gibraltar	3–4	Belarus
Ramagee 22'; Henwood 33', 47'	Report	Mikheichyk 4'; Lukashik 10'; Kisialevich 44', 59'

Umpires:
Paul van den Assum (NED)
Sinan Acar (TUR)

5 September 2018
16:30

Scotland	2–0	Portugal
White 36'; Harwood 57'	Report

Umpires:
Sean Edwards (ENG)
Anton Kochin (RUS)

6 September 2018
12:30

Belarus	2–2	Russia
Lutsevich 38'; Stsepanets 48'	Report	Loginov 4'; Shchipachev 27'

Umpires:
Sean Edwards (ENG)
Paulo Lima (POR)

6 September 2018
14:30

Gibraltar	0–2	Scotland
	Report	Golden 3'; Harwood 34'

Umpires:
Anton Kochin (RUS)
Andrei Saroka (BLR)

6 September 2018
16:30

Portugal	5–4	Turkey
Gonçalves 12'; Caramalho 17', 28'; Marques 36'; Mourão 46'	Report	Ataş 21'; Demirel 26'; Erman 38'; Karakuş 45'

Umpires:
Paul van den Assum (NED)
Lewis White (SCO)

8 September 2018
12:30

Turkey	1–7	Belarus
Ataş 57'	Report	Belavusau 3'; Lukashik 7'; Stsepanets 29'; Mikheichyk 31'; Hancharou 39'; Liakh 43'; Korsik 54'

Umpires:
Anton Kochin (RUS)
Lewis White (SCO)

8 September 2018
14:30

Scotland	1–4	Russia
Cranney 38'	Report	Golubev 11'; Matkovskiy 19', 50'; Khairullin 56'

Umpires:
Sean Edwards (ENG)
Paulo Lima (POR)

8 September 2018
16:30

Portugal	2–2	Gibraltar
Ribeiro 44'; Rodrigues 55'	Report	López 48'; Cerisola 54'

Umpires:
Andrei Saroka (BLR)
Paul van den Assum (NED)

9 September 2018
12:30

Belarus	0–4	Scotland
	Report	Forsyth 19'; Golden 21', 34'; Harwood 23'

Umpires:
Paul van den Assum (NED)
Anton Kochin (RUS)

9 September 2018
14:30

Turkey	2–3	Gibraltar
Demirel 9', 48'	Report	López 12'; Henwood 24'; Carisola 46'

Umpires:
Paulo Lima (POR)
Andrei Saroka (BLR)

9 September 2018
16:30

Russia	13–1	Portugal
Khairullin 2', 19', 38', 39', 48'; Kuraev 8'; Iurinov 22'; Gilev 25'; Golubev 37'; Maiorov 41'; Zheleznyakov 42', 60'; Zamalutdinov 60'	Report	Rodrigues 25'

Umpires:
Sinan Acar (TUR)
Sean Edwards (ENG)

== Santiago ==
Hockey Series Open Santiago
Tournament details
- Host country: Chile
- City: Santiago
- Dates: 18–23 September
- Teams: 6
- Venue: Prince of Wales Country Club

Final positions
- Champions: Chile
- Runner-up: Brazil
- Third place: Venezuela

Tournament statistics
- Matches played: 15
- Goals scored: 113 (7.53 per match)
- Top scorer: (Brazil) Lucas Paixão (14 goals)

=== Pool ===
Pos	Team	Pld	W	D	L	GF	GA	GD	Pts	Qualification
1	Chile (H)	5	4	1	0	44	2	+42	13	Hockey Series Finals
2	Brazil	5	4	0	1	39	5	+34	12	Hockey Series Finals
3	Venezuela	5	3	0	2	20	10	+10	9	
4	Uruguay	5	2	1	2	8	5	+3	7	
5	Peru	5	1	0	4	5	21	−16	3	
6	Bolivia	5	0	0	5	0	73	−73	0	

Source: FIH
Rules for classification: 1) points; 2) matches won; 3) goal difference; 4) goals for; 5) head-to-head result; 6) field goals for.
(H) Hosts

All times are local (UTC−4).

=== Results ===
18 September 2018
14:00

Brazil	22–0	Bolivia
Paixão 3', 4', 20', 25', 32', 42', 58'; Imer 6', 27'; Borges 9', 11', 23', 26', 43'; P. Van der Heijden 18'; Bitencourt 33', 58'; Lopez 35', 36'; Vaz 52'; Y. Van der Heijden 55'; Assis 57'	Report

Umpires:
Donovan Simmons (BER)
Rodrigo Rivadeneira (PER)

18 September 2018
16:00

Venezuela	2–0	Uruguay
Adrian 19'; Vargas 29'	Report

Umpires:
Federico Silva (ARG)
Rafael Mendonça (BRA)

18 September 2018
18:00

Chile	7–0	Peru
Becerra 19', 44'; Maldonado 33'; N. Renz 36'; Goni 43'; Purcell 54'; Richter 58'	Report

Umpires:
Daniel López (URU)
Andrey Umana (CRC)

19 September 2018
14:00

Bolivia	0–14	Venezuela
	Report	Adrian 10', 36', 38', 40', 58'; Laya 15', 23'; Vargas 20', 26', 33', 59', 60'; Escobar 24'; Castro 32'

Umpires:
Daniel López (URU)
Alfonso Mery (CHI)

19 September 2018
16:00

Brazil	9–0	Peru
Bitencourt 3', 58'; Paixão 22', 34', 44', 52'; Lopez 27', 39', 41'; Duncker 60'	Report

Umpires:
Federico Silva (ARG)
Manuel Sierra (VEN)

19 September 2018
18:00

Chile	0–0	Uruguay
	Report

Umpires:
Donovan Simmons (BER)
Andrey Umana (CRC)

20 September 2018
14:00

Venezuela	1–3	Brazil
Bracamonte 37'	Report	López 36'; Borges 40'; Paixão 60'

Umpires:
Daniel López (URU)
Donovan Simmons (BER)

20 September 2018
16:00

Uruguay	2–0	Peru
López 22', 50'	Report

Umpires:
Federico Silva (ARG)
Alfonso Mery (CHI)

20 September 2018
18:00

Bolivia	0–27	Chile
	Report	Becerra 3', 4', 24', 34'; Troncoso 6', 14'; Purcell 13'; Rodríguez 14', 21', 25', 42', 43', 45'; N. Renz 20', 39', 47', 50'; Amoroso 26', 41'; Maldonado 32', 57'; Richter 33'; Strabucchi 33'; Hurtado 49', 51'; Esparza 53'; F. Renz 57'

Umpires:
Rodrigo Rivadeneira (PER)
Rafael Mendonça (BRA)

22 September 2018
14:00

Peru	5–0	Bolivia
Corno 3', 8', 21'; Dennison 17', 58'	Report

Umpires:
Andrey Umana (CRC)
Rafael Mendonça (BRA)

22 September 2018
16:00

Brazil	3–1	Uruguay
Lopez 5'; Borges 8', 21'	Report	Martinoni 52'

Umpires:
Donovan Simmons (BER)
Manuel Sierra (VEN)

22 September 2018
18:00

Venezuela	0–7	Chile
	Report	Maldonado 21'; Strabucchi 29'; N. Renz 31'; F. Renz 36', 44'; Gesswein 50'; Richter 56'

Umpires:
Federico Silva (ARG)
Rodrigo Rivadeneira (PER)

23 September 2018
14:00

Uruguay	5–0	Bolivia
Ferreira 9'; Salmini 25'; Rivero 39'; Martinoni 52'; Castro 53'	Report

Umpires:
Manuel Sierra (VEN)
Rodrigo Rivadeneira (PER)

23 September 2018
16:00

Peru	0–3	Venezuela
	Report	Adrian 23'; Salazar 40'; Vargas 60'

Umpires:
Alfonso Mery (CHI)
Rafael Mendonça (BRA)

23 September 2018
18:00

Chile	3–2	Brazil
Richter 11'; N. Renz 44'; Becerra 55'	Report	Paixão 49', 51'

Umpires:
Daniel López (URU)
Federico Silva (ARG)

== Bulawayo ==
Hockey Series Open Bulawayo
Tournament details
- Host country: Zimbabwe
- City: Bulawayo
- Dates: 7–9 December
- Teams: 4
- Venue: Khumalo Hockey Stadium

Final positions
- Champions: Egypt
- Runner-up: Zimbabwe
- Third place: Zambia

Tournament statistics
- Matches played: 6
- Goals scored: 54 (9 per match)
- Top scorer: (Egypt) Ahmed El-Ganaini (10 goals)

=== Pool ===
Pos	Team	Pld	W	D	L	GF	GA	GD	Pts	Qualification
1	Egypt	3	3	0	0	34	2	+32	9	Hockey Series Finals
2	Zimbabwe (H)	3	0	2	1	6	9	−3	2	
3	Zambia	3	0	2	1	6	19	−13	2	
4	Namibia	3	0	2	1	8	24	−16	2	

Source: FIH
Rules for classification: 1) points; 2) matches won; 3) goal difference; 4) goals for; 5) head-to-head result; 6) field goals for.
(H) Hosts

All times are local (UTC+2).

=== Results ===
7 December 2018
14:00

Egypt	17–1	Namibia
Adel 4', 6', 20', 43'; Elhady 8', 12', 14'; Mansour 10'; Gamal 24'; El-Ganaini 34', 37', 39', 55'; Metwalli 38'; El-Naggar 41'; Atef 47'	Report	Britz 56'

Umpires:
Ayden Shrives (RSA)
Munashe Mashoko (ZIM)

7 December 2018
16:00

Zimbabwe	2–2	Zambia
Kanyangarara 7', 55'	Report	Katele 35'; Mpande 37'

Umpires:
Mohamed Hassan (EGY)
Peter Caulder (RSA)

8 December 2018
14:00

Namibia	4–4	Zambia
Hermanus 29', 30'; Martins 60'; Jacobs 60'	Report	Moyo 8'; Bwali 13', 37'; Mbulo 54'

Umpires:
Munashe Mashoko (ZIM)
Mohamed Hassan (EGY)

8 December 2018
16:00

Egypt	4–1	Zimbabwe
Adel 3'; El-Ganaini 33', 43'; Ibrahim 35'	Report	Kanyangarara 31'

Umpires:
Elvis Bwalya (ZAM)
Ayden Shrives (RSA)

9 December 2018
14:00

Egypt	13–0	Zambia
Adel 1', 10', 41'; Ibrahim 8'; El-Ganaini 9', 15', 24', 35'; Mamdouh 17'; El-Naggar 29', 48'; Metwalli 34'; Mansour 60'	Report

Umpires:
Munashe Mashoko (ZIM)
Peter Caulder (RSA)

9 December 2018
16:00

Namibia	3–3	Zimbabwe
Van der Merve 17', 24'; Hermanus 59'	Report	Mpofu 14'; Machaya 32', 40'

Umpires:
Elvis Bwalya (ZAM)
Ayden Shrives (RSA)

== Lahore ==
Hockey Series Open Lahore
Tournament details
- Host country: Pakistan
- City: Lahore
- Dates: 17–22 December
- Teams: 4
- Venue: National Hockey Stadium

Final positions
- Champions: Uzbekistan
- Runner-up: Kazakhstan
- Third place: Nepal

Tournament statistics
- Matches played: 6
- Goals scored: 44 (7.33 per match)
- Top scorer: (Uzbekistan) Karimov Ruslan (7 goals)

The tournament was scheduled earlier but cancelled because the invited teams did not wanted to travel to Pakistan.

=== Pool ===
Pos	Team	Pld	W	D	L	GF	GA	GD	Pts	Qualification
1	Uzbekistan	3	3	0	0	23	3	+20	9	Hockey Series Finals
2	Kazakhstan	3	2	0	1	16	6	+10	6	
3	Nepal	3	1	0	2	5	12	−7	3	
4	Afghanistan	3	0	0	3	0	23	−23	0	

Source: FIH
Rules for classification: 1) points; 2) matches won; 3) goal difference; 4) goals for; 5) head-to-head result; 6) field goals for.

All times are local (UTC+5).

=== Results ===
17 December 2018
12:00

Afghanistan	0–11	Uzbekistan
	Report	Khaytboev 6'; Khakimov 7', 14'; Sultonov 9'; Mirzakarimov 11'; Kalandarov 22', 23', 28'; Ruslan 33', 36', 38'

Umpires:
Hafiz Latif (PAK)
Makhsudbek Urmanov (KAZ)

18 December 2018
12:00

Kazakhstan	6–0	Nepal
Tashkeyev 15', 25', 53', 59'; Kozhym 18'; Uzbek 39'	Report

Umpires:
Hafiz Latif (PAK)
Sohail Janjua (PAK)

19 December 2018
14:00

Afghanistan	0–8	Kazakhstan
	Report	Yelubayev 4', 41', 46'; Urmanov 12', 26'; Kozhym 30+'; Uzbek 39'; Tashkeyev 43'

Umpires:
Hafiz Latif (PAK)
Yasir Khurshid (PAK)

20 December 2018
14:00

Uzbekistan	6–1	Nepal
Khakimov 23'; Khaytboev 36'; Sultonov 50'; Ruslan 52', 53'; Kalandarov 60+'	Report	Rana 41'

Umpires:
Sohail Janjua (PAK)
Waqas Butt (AZE)

21 December 2018
12:00

Nepal	4–0	Afghanistan
Rana 3'; Acharya 28', 32'; Karki 58'	Report

Umpires:
Yasir Khurshid (PAK)
Makhsudbek Zrmanov (KAZ)

22 December 2018
14:00

Kazakhstan	2–6	Uzbekistan
Kozhym 18'; Uzbek 39'	Report	Khakimov 19'; Ruslan 27', 34'; Khaytboev 36'; Nazarov 41', 56'

Umpires:
Sohail Janjua (PAK)
Yasir Khurshid (PAK)
