= Federico Monja =

Argentine field hockey player

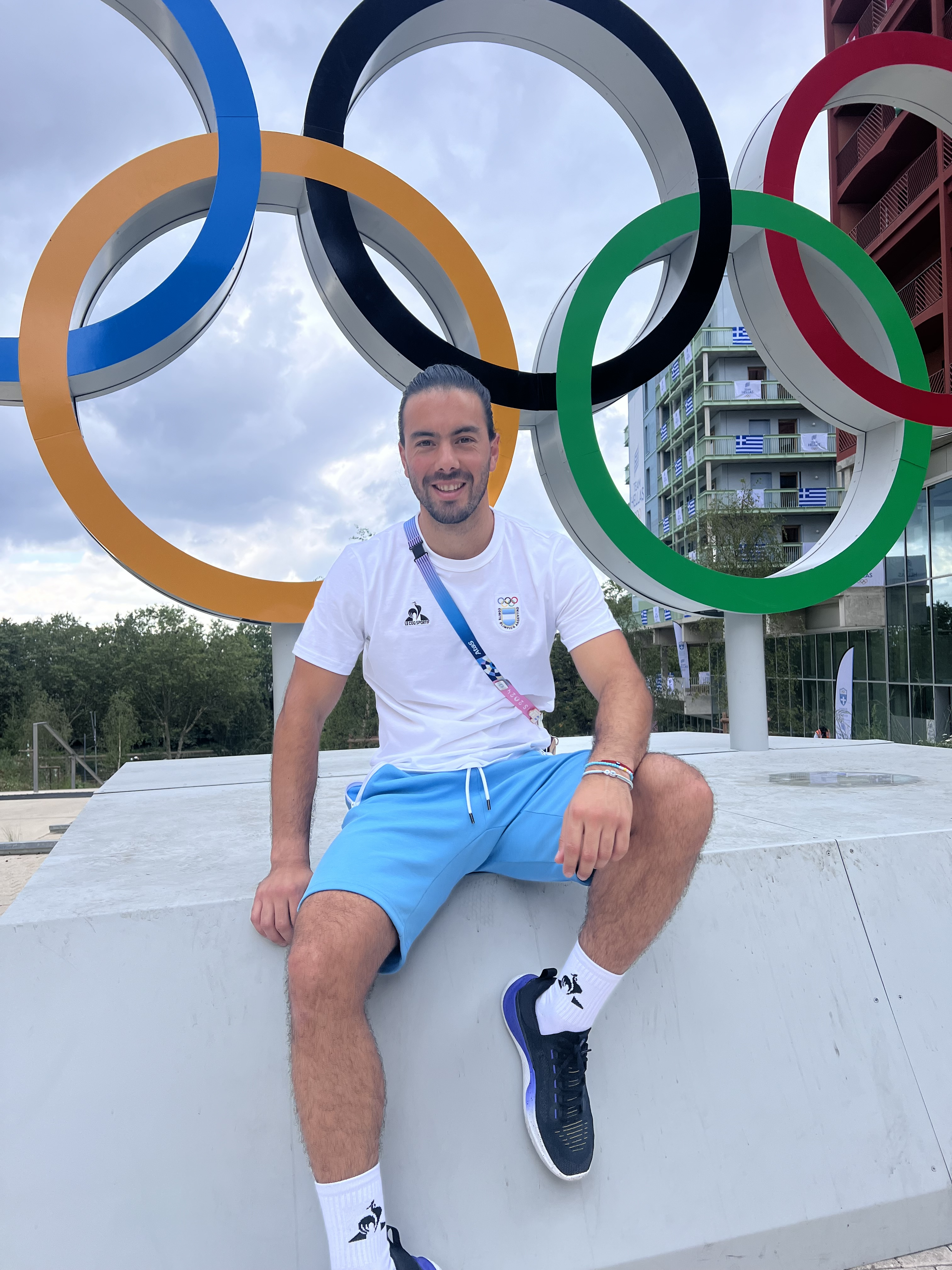
- Monja at the 2024 Summer Olympics in Paris

Personal information
- Full name: Federico Lionel Monja
- Born: 12 September 1993 (age 32) Buenos Aires, Argentina
- Height: 1.75 m (5 ft 9 in)
- Weight: 71 kg (157 lb)

Sport
- Sport: Field hockey
- Position: Defender
Senior career
Years	Team	Caps	Goals
2012–2019	Banco Provincia	-	-
2021–2022	Royal Léopold Club	-	-
2022–2024	Paris Jean-Bouin	-	-
2024–present	Atlètic Terrassa Hockey Club	-	-
National team
Years	Team	Caps	Goals
2012–2013	Argentina U–21	17	(2)
2018–present	Argentina	85	(5)
Medal record
Men's field hockey
Representing Argentina
Pan American Games
Gold medal – first place	2023 Santiago	Team
Pan American Cup
Gold medal – first place	2022 Santiago	Team
Pan American Junior Championship
Gold medal – first place	2012 Guadalajara	Team
Sultan of Johor Cup
Bronze medal – third place	2013 Johor Bahru	Team

Federico Lionel Monja (born 12 September 1993) is an Argentine field hockey player who plays as a defender for Spanish club Atlètic Terrassa Hockey Club and the Argentina men's national field hockey team.

Monja represented Argentina at the 2024 Summer Olympics in Paris.

== Club career ==
=== Banco Provincia ===
Monja developed as a hockey player in the youth ranks of Banco Provincia, making his senior debut in 2012. During his eight seasons with the first team (2012–2019), he established himself as a core defender during one of the most successful eras in the club's history, capturing six Torneo Metropolitano championships (2012, 2013, 2015, 2016, 2018, and 2019).

=== European career ===
In 2021, Monja made his transition to European field hockey by signing with Belgian Men's Hockey League powerhouse Royal Léopold Club in Brussels for the 2021–22 campaign.

Following his season in Belgium, he moved to France in 2022 to join Paris Jean-Bouin, competing in the top division of French field hockey until 2024.

In the summer of 2024, Monja signed with historic Spanish side Atlètic Terrassa Hockey Club to compete in Spain's División de Honor.

== International career ==
=== Junior national team ===
Monja made his international debut for the Argentina under-21 team in 2012. He was part of the national squad that won the gold medal at the Pan American Junior Championship in Guadalajara, Mexico.

In 2013, he continued to feature with the junior side, winning a bronze medal at the 2013 Sultan of Johor Cup in Johor Bahru, Malaysia, and later competing in the 2013 Men's Hockey Junior World Cup in New Delhi, India.

=== Senior national team (Los Leones) ===
In 2018, Monja received his first call-up to the senior national team, Los Leones, making his senior international debut during a test series against Malaysia in Buenos Aires.

He subsequently became a regular defensive fixture in the national setup, appearing across multiple seasons of the Men's FIH Pro League. Ahead of the 2020 Summer Olympics in Tokyo, Monja was selected as an alternate athlete for the national squad.

In 2022, Monja won a gold medal with Los Leones at the 2022 Men's Pan American Cup in Santiago, Chile. In 2023, he represented Argentina at the 2023 Men's FIH Hockey World Cup held in Bhubaneswar and Rourkela, India. Later that year, he secured another continental title by winning the gold medal at the 2023 Pan American Games in Santiago.

In 2024, Monja was named in the final 16-player Argentine roster for the 2024 Summer Olympics in Paris. He competed in all matches during the tournament at the Stade Yves-du-Manoir, helping Argentina reach the quarter-finals.

==== International goals ====
Goal	Date	Location	Opponent	Score	Result	Competition	Ref.
1	19 February 2022	CeNARD, Buenos Aires, Argentina	England	2–0	2–0	2021–22 FIH Pro League	
2	23 April 2022	CeNARD, Buenos Aires, Argentina	South Africa	1–0	4–3	2021–22 FIH Pro League	
3	29 October 2023	Centro Deportivo de Hockey Césped, Santiago, Chile	Peru	20–0	22–0	2023 Pan American Games	
4	29 October 2023	Centro Deportivo de Hockey Césped, Santiago, Chile	Peru	21–0	22–0	2023 Pan American Games	
5	26 May 2024	Wilrijkse Plein, Antwerp, Belgium	India	1–0	4–5	2023–24 FIH Pro League	

== Honours ==
=== Club ===
Banco Provincia

- Torneo Metropolitano: 2012, 2013, 2015, 2016, 2018, 2019

=== International ===
Argentina U–21

- Pan American Junior Championship: 2012
- Sultan of Johor Cup Bronze Medal: 2013

Argentina

- Pan American Games: 2023
- Pan American Cup: 2022

== Club career ==
Monja developed as a senior player at Banco Provincia in Argentina, where he competed between 2012 and 2019. During this spell, he was an integral part of the squad that dominated the local league, securing six Torneo Metropolitano titles (2012, 2013, 2015, 2016, 2018, and 2019).

In 2021, Monja made his transition to European club hockey by signing with Belgian top-flight club Royal Léopold Club in Brussels for the 2021–22 season. In 2022, he moved to France to join Paris Jean-Bouin, competing in the French elite division through 2024. In the summer of 2024, Monja signed with the historic Spanish team Atlètic Terrassa Hockey Club in the División de Honor.

== International career ==
=== Junior national team ===
Monja made his international debut for the under-21 team in 2012. He was part of the squad that won the gold medal at the Pan American Junior Championship in Guadalajara, Mexico.

In 2013, he continued to represent the junior team, winning a bronze medal at the 2013 Sultan of Johor Cup in Malaysia and later participating in the 2013 Men's Hockey Junior World Cup held in New Delhi, India.

=== Senior national team (Los Leones) ===
In 2018, Monja received his first call-up to the senior national team, Los Leones, debuting during a test series against Malaysia in Buenos Aires.

He subsequently established himself as a regular fixture in the national team defense, earning 85 international caps and regularly competing across multiple seasons of the Men's FIH Pro League.

In 2022, Monja was a member of the Argentine squad that claimed the gold medal at the 2022 Men's Pan American Cup in Santiago, Chile. The following year, he represented Argentina at the 2023 Men's FIH Hockey World Cup in Bhubaneswar and Rourkela, India. Later in 2023, he won another gold medal with Los Leones at the 2023 Pan American Games in Santiago.

In 2024, Monja was selected to represent Argentina at the 2024 Summer Olympics in Paris.

==== International goals ====
Goal	Date	Location	Opponent	Score	Result	Competition	Ref.
1	19 February 2022	CeNARD, Buenos Aires, Argentina	England	2–0	2–0	2021–22 FIH Pro League	
2	23 April 2022	CeNARD, Buenos Aires, Argentina	South Africa	1–0	4–3	2021–22 FIH Pro League	
3	29 October 2023	Centro Deportivo de Hockey Césped, Santiago, Chile	Peru	20–0	22–0	2023 Pan American Games	
4	29 October 2023	Centro Deportivo de Hockey Césped, Santiago, Chile	Peru	21–0	22–0	2023 Pan American Games	
5	26 May 2024	Wilrijkse Plein, Antwerp, Belgium	India	1–0	4–5	2023–24 FIH Pro League	

== Honours ==
=== Club ===
Banco Provincia

- Torneo Metropolitano: 2012, 2013, 2015, 2016, 2018, 2019

=== International ===
Argentina U–21

- Pan American Junior Championship: 2012
- Sultan of Johor Cup Bronze Medal: 2013

Argentina

- Pan American Games: 2023
- Pan American Cup: 2022
