= Field hockey at the 2019 Pan American Games – Men's tournament =

Men's field hockey at the 2019 Pan American Games
Tournament details
- Host country: Peru
- City: Lima
- Dates: 30 July – 10 August
- Teams: 8 (from 1 confederation)

Final positions
- Champions: Argentina (10th title)
- Runner-up: Canada
- Third place: United States

Tournament statistics
- Matches played: 24
- Goals scored: 157 (6.54 per match)
- Top scorer(s): (Argentina) Maico Casella (Argentina) Leandro Tolini (10 goals)

The men's field hockey tournament at the 2019 Pan American Games was the 14th edition of the field hockey event for men at the Pan American Games. It took place over a twelve-day period beginning on 30 July, and culminated with the medal finals on 10 August.

The winner of the tournament qualified for the 2020 Summer Olympics in Tokyo, Japan.

== Qualification ==
A total of eight men's teams qualified to compete at the games. The host nation (Peru) received automatic qualification. The top two teams at the 2018 Central American and Caribbean Games and 2018 South American Games also qualified. The top two teams not yet qualified from the 2017 Pan American Cup (after the results from the above two tournaments are taken into account) also qualified. If Canada and/or the United States have not qualified still, a playoff between the nations and the third-ranked at the Pan American Cups will take place. If both nations do qualify, the playoff will be not necessary and the third placed team at each Pan American Cup will qualify. The Pan American Hockey Federation (PAHF) officially announced the qualified teams on 10 September 2018.

=== Summary ===
Event	Dates	Location	Quotas	Qualified
Host Nation	—N/a	—N/a	1	Peru
2018 South American Games	29 May – 6 June	(Bolivia) Cochabamba	2	Argentina; Chile
2018 Central American and Caribbean Games	21–29 July	(Colombia) Barranquilla	2	Cuba; Mexico
2017 Men's Pan American Cup	4–12 August	(United States) Lancaster	3	Canada; United States; Trinidad and Tobago
Total			8	

- A playoff was not necessary, as Canada and the United States were the top two teams not qualified from the 2017 Men's Pan American Cup.

== Results ==
The official schedule was revealed on 10 January 2019.

All times are local (UTC−5).

=== Preliminary round ===
==== Pool A ====
Pos	Team	Pld	W	D	L	GF	GA	GD	Pts	Qualification
1	Argentina	3	3	0	0	20	1	+19	9	Quarter-finals
2	Chile	3	2	0	1	7	5	+2	6	Quarter-finals
3	Cuba	3	1	0	2	3	15	−12	3	Quarter-finals
4	Trinidad and Tobago	3	0	0	3	2	11	−9	0	Quarter-finals

Source: FIH

30 July 2019
10:00

Argentina	5–1	Chile
Tolini 4', 5'; Ferreiro 8'; Martínez 26'; Vila 30'	Report	Becerra 31'

Umpires:
Peter Wright (RSA)
Gus Soteriades (USA)

30 July 2019
12:00

Trinidad and Tobago	2–3	Cuba
Browne 19'; Pierre 48'	Report	Consuegra 22', 50'; Aguliera 51'

Umpires:
Tyler Klenk (CAN)
Benjamin Peters (USA)

1 August 2019
14:00

Chile	4–0	Cuba
Becerra 14', 17'; Richter 36'; Fer. Renz 60'	Report

Umpires:
Gus Soteriades (USA)
Jonathan Altamirano (MEX)

1 August 2019
16:00

Trinidad and Tobago	0–6	Argentina
	Report	Tolini 3'; Mazzilli 25', 45'; Paredes 29'; Casella 41'; Martínez 49'

Umpires:
Deepak Joshi (IND)
Rodrigo Rivadeneira (PER)

3 August 2019
10:00

Chile	2–0	Trinidad and Tobago
Rodriguez 15'; Amoroso 37'	Report

Umpires:
Tyler Klenk (CAN)
Jonathan Altamirano (MEX)

3 August 2019
14:00

Argentina	9–0	Cuba
Tolini 11', 46'; Martínez 15', 42'; Fernandez 40'; Mazzilli 51'; Keenan 53'; Casella 53', 58'	Report

Umpires:
Gus Soteriades (USA)
Benjamin Peters {USA}

==== Pool B ====
Pos	Team	Pld	W	D	L	GF	GA	GD	Pts	Qualification
1	Canada	3	3	0	0	23	2	+21	9	Quarter-finals
2	United States	3	2	0	1	21	5	+16	6	Quarter-finals
3	Mexico	3	1	0	2	10	12	−2	3	Quarter-finals
4	Peru (H)	3	0	0	3	3	38	−35	0	Quarter-finals

Source: FIH
(H) Hosts

30 July 2019
14:00

Canada	5–1	Mexico
Scholfield 7', 39'; Pearson 28', 30'; Pereira 54'	Report	Aguilar 34'

Umpires:
Frederico Silva (ARG)
Hugo Romero (PAR)

30 July 2019
16:00

United States	16–0	Peru
K. Kaeppler 2', 51'; Harris 2'; Huisman 3', 10', 11', 47', 55'; Cicchi 6', 26'; Montilla 7', 39'; Singh 31', 45'; Orozco 47'; Barratt 49'	Report

Umpires:
Deepak Joshi (IND)
Reinier Diaz (CUB)

1 August 2019
10:00

Mexico	8–2	Peru
Sosa 3', 54'; Aguilar 30+', 33'; Villegas 41', 57'; Sandoval 54'; Estrada 60'	Report	Vilakivi 49'; Dias Espinosa 55'

Umpires:
Reinier Diaz (CUB)
Hugo Romero (PAR)

1 August 2019
12:00

United States	0–4	Canada
	Report	Johnston 5', 11'; Pearson 18'; Kirkpatrick 38'

Umpires:
Peter Wright (RSA)
Federico Silva (ARG)

3 August 2019
12:00

Mexico	1–5	United States
Terminel 41'	Report	Montilla 26', 55'; Sundeen 41'; Harris 43'; A. Käppeler 54'

Umpires:
Peter Wright (RSA)
Reinier Diaz (CUB)

3 August 2019
16:00

Canada	14–1	Peru
I. Smythe 3'; Johnston 4'; Wallace 4', 36'; Tupper 14', 57'; Panesar 22'; Pereira 26', 55'; Scholfield 27', 41', 44'; Pearson 33', 42'	Report	Diaz Espinosa 8'

Umpires:
Deepak Joshi (IND)
Federico Silva (ARG)

=== Classification round ===
==== Bracket ====
Quarter-finals
5 August
Argentina	14
Peru	1
5 August
Cuba	1
United States	5
5 August
Chile	2
Mexico	0
5 August
Trinidad and Tobago	1
Canada	5

Semi-finals
8 August
Argentina	5
United States	0
8 August
Chile	2
Canada	3

Gold medal match
10 August
Argentina	5
Canada	2
Bronze medal match
10 August
United States	2
Chile	1

==== Quarter-finals ====
5 August 2019
13:30

Argentina	14–1	Peru
Tolini 2', 35', 57'; Rey 6'; Ferreiro 13', 60'; Martínez 19'; Paredes 20', 49'; Casella 21', 25', 39', 43', 47'	Report	Diaz Espinosa 30'

Umpires:
Jonathan Altamirano (MEX)
Benjamin Peters (USA)

5 August 2019
15:45

Chile	2–0	Mexico
Fel. Renz 22'; Richter 54'	Report

Umpires:
Peter Wright (RSA)
Hugo Romero (PAR)

5 August 2019
18:00

Cuba	1–5	United States
Consuegra 38'	Report	Harris 36'; A. Käppeler 40'; Huisman 41', 51'; Singh 51'

Umpires:
Tyler Klenk (CAN)
Federico Silva (ARG)

5 August 2019
20:15

Trinidad and Tobago	1–5	Canada
Browne 6'	Report	I. Smythe 2'; Pearson 10'; Bissett 47'; Tupper 49', 56'

Umpires:
Deepak Joshi (IND)
Gus Soteriades (USA)

==== Fifth to eighth place classification ====
Cross-overs
8 August
Peru	0
Cuba	7
8 August
Mexico	0
Trinidad and Tobago	3

Fifth place
10 August
Cuba	1
Trinidad and Tobago	2
Seventh place
10 August
Peru	0
Mexico	6

===== Cross-overs =====
8 August 2019
09:30

Peru	0–7	Cuba
	Report	Lopez 27'; Aguilera 38'; Somonte 44'; Consuegra 48', 54'; Tratzant 50'; Calderon 53'

Umpires:
Peter Wright (RSA)
Jonathan Altamiano (MEX)

8 August 2019
11:45

Mexico	0–3	Trinidad and Tobago
	Report	Te. Marcano 43', 47'; Ta. Marcano 47'

Umpires:
Benjamin Peters (USA)
Reinier Diaz (CUB)

===== Seventh and eighth place =====
10 August 2019
09:30

Peru	0–6	Mexico
	Report	Mendez 21', 22', 51'; Castillo 30'; Aguilar 49'; Hernández 58'

Umpires:
Benjamin Peters (USA)
Reinier Diaz (CUB)

===== Fifth and sixth place =====
10 August 2019
11:45

Cuba	1–2	Trinidad and Tobago
Calderon 22'	Report	James 10'; Te. Mercano 17'

Umpires:
Deepak Joshi (IND)
Hugo Romero (PAR)

==== Semi-finals ====
8 August 2019
15:00

Argentina	5–0	United States
Paredes 5'; Vila 14'; Mazzilli 20'; Casella 45'; Martínez 59'	Report

Umpires:
Tyler Klenk (CAN)
Hugo Romero (PAR)

8 August 2019
17:15

Chile	2–3	Canada
Rodriguez 23', 54'	Report	Tupper 19', 55'; Johnston 43'

Umpires:
Deepak Joshi (IND)
Gus Soteriades (USA)

==== Bronze medal match ====
10 August 2019
15:00

United States	2–1	Chile
Huisman 2'; A. Käppeler 38'	Report	Renz 50'

Umpires:
Federico Silva (ARG)
Tyler Klenk (CAN)

==== Gold medal match ====
10 August 2019
17:15

(gold) Argentina	5–2	Canada (silver)
Tolini 17', 19'; Ferreiro 27'; Casella 40'; Martínez 53'	Report	Tupper 16'; Johnston 60'

Umpires:
Peter Wright (RSA)
Gus Soteriades (USA)

== Statistics ==
=== Final standings ===
Pos	Team	Qualification
1	Argentina	2020 Summer Olympics
2	Canada	
3	United States	
4	Chile	
5	Trinidad and Tobago	
6	Cuba	
7	Mexico	
8	Peru (H)	

Source: FIH
(H) Host

=== Goalscorers ===
There were 157 goals scored in 24 matches, for an average of 6.54 goals per match.

10 goals

- (Argentina) Maico Casella
- (Argentina) Leandro Tolini

8 goals

- (United States) Deegan Huisman

7 goals

- (Argentina) Lucas Martínez
- (Canada) Scott Tupper

6 goals

- (Canada) Mark Pearson

5 goals

- (Canada) Gordon Johnston
- (Canada) Oliver Scholfield

4 goals

- (Argentina) Martín Ferreiro
- (Argentina) Agustín Mazzilli
- (Argentina) Matías Paredes
- (Cuba) Carlos Consuegra
- (Mexico) Francisco Aguilar
- (United States) Alberto Montilla

3 goals

- (Canada) Keegan Pereira
- (Chile) Martin Rodriguez
- (Mexico) Alejandro Mendez
- (Peru) Rodrigo Diaz Espinosa
- (Trinidad and Tobago) Teague Marcano
- (United States) Patrick Harris
- (United States) Aki Käppeler
- (United States) Paul Singh

2 goals

- (Argentina) Lucas Vila
- (Canada) Iain Smythe
- (Canada) James Wallace
- (Chile) Felipe Renz
- (Chile) Nicolas Renz
- (Chile) Sven Richter
- (Cuba) Roger Aguliera
- (Cuba) Iraidys Calderon
- (Mexico) Juan Sosa
- (Mexico) Luis Villegas
- (Trinidad and Tobago) Kwan Browne
- (United States) Sean Cicchi
- (United States) Kei Käppeler

1 goal

- (Argentina) Federico Fernández
- (Argentina) Nicolás Keenan
- (Argentina) Matías Rey
- (Canada) Brenden Bissett
- (Canada) James Kirkpatrick
- (Canada) Sukhi Panesar
- (Chile) Juan Amoroso
- (Chile) Franco Becerra
- (Chile) Fernando Renz
- (Cuba) Juan Lopez
- (Cuba) Wilfredo Sanchez
- (Cuba) Richard Somonte
- (Cuba) Maikel Tritzant
- (Mexico) Daniel Castillo
- (Mexico) Jorge Estrada
- (Mexico) Erik Hernández
- (Mexico) Alexander Sandoval
- (Mexico) David Terminel
- (Peru) Johannes Vilakivi
- (Trinidad and Tobago) Marcus James
- (Trinidad and Tobago) Tariq Marcano
- (Trinidad and Tobago) Mickel Pierre
- (United States) Tom Barratt
- (United States) Jonathan Orozco
- (United States) Tyler Sundeen

Source: FIH
