= 2010 Pan American Youth Championship (boys' field hockey) =

Tournament details
- Host country: Mexico
- City: Hermosillo
- Dates: 7–13 February
- Teams: 5

Final positions
- Champions: Argentina (1st title)
- Runner-up: United States
- Third place: Chile

Tournament statistics
- Matches played: 12
- Goals scored: 49 (4.08 per match)
- Top scorer(s): (Argentina) Nicolás Cicileo (Chile) Vicente Martín (4 goals)
- Best player: (Argentina) Nicolás Cicileo

The 2010 Pan American Youth Championship was the first edition of the Pan American Youth Championship, an international under–18 field hockey competition. The boys' tournament was held in Hermosillo, Mexico, from 7–13 February.

The tournament also served as a direct qualifier for the 2010 Summer Youth Olympics. Argentina defeated the United States 2–1 in the final to become champions, while Chile won the third-place playoff against Canada 5–1.

== Qualified teams ==
- Argentina
- Canada
- Chile
- Mexico
- United States

== Umpires ==
The following umpires were appointed by the Pan American Hockey Federation to officiate the tournament:

- Albert Marcano (TTO)
- Arturo Vázquez (MEX)
- Daniel Basto (MEX)
- Gavin Caldecott (CAN)
- Jamar Springer (BAR)
- Javier Loza (ARG)
- Lance Sarabia (USA)

== Results ==
=== Preliminary round ===
Pos	Team	Pld	W	D	L	GF	GA	GD	Pts	Qualification
1	Argentina	4	4	0	0	15	2	+13	12	Advanced to Final
2	United States	4	3	0	1	8	6	+2	9	Advanced to Final
3	Canada	4	2	0	2	6	7	−1	6	
4	Chile	4	0	1	3	6	12	−6	1	
5	Mexico	4	0	1	3	5	13	−8	1	

Source: PAHF
Rules for classification: 1) points; 2) goal difference; 3) goals scored; 4) head-to-head result.

==== Fixtures ====
7 February 2010
12:00

Chile	1–3	United States
Purcell 48'	Report	Linney 28'; Kundi 56'; Beatty 62'

Umpires:
Arturo Vázquez (MEX)
Jamar Springer (BAR)

7 February 2010
15:00

Canada	1–0	Mexico
Dhaliwal 66'	Report

Umpires:
Albert Marcano (TTO)
Lance Sarabia (USA)

8 February 2010
14:00

Mexico	0–6	Argentina
	Report	Pérez 12'; Fernández 28', 30'; Cicileo 34', 69'; Trezza 50'

Umpires:
Gavin Caldecott (CAN)
Albert Marcano (TTO)

8 February 2010
16:30

Canada	3–1	Chile
Roydhouse 39'; Ho-García 41', 47'	Report	Martín 68'

Umpires:
Daniel Basto (MEX)
Javier Loza (ARG)

9 February 2010
14:00

Chile	4–4	Mexico
Martín 1'; Purcell 37'; Köster 60'; Hamilton 70'	Report	Campillo 11', 52'; Trillas 35'; Figueroa 68'

Umpires:
Jamar Springer (BAR)
Lance Sarabia (USA)

9 February 2010
16:30

United States	1–3	Argentina
Linney 64'	Report	Sueiro 18'; Serrano 26'; Casini 45'

Umpires:
Gavin Caldecott (CAN)
Arturo Vázquez (MEX)

11 February 2010
10:00

Argentina	4–1	Canada
Castronovo 1', 33'; Cicileo 6', 64'	Report	Johnston 26'

Umpires:
Albert Marcano (TTO)
Daniel Basto (MEX)

11 February 2010
12:30

Mexico	1–2	United States
Chávez 28'	Report	Ajaypal 38'; Linney 47'

Umpires:
Jamar Springer (BAR)
Javier Loza (ARG)

12 February 2010
10:00

Argentina	2–0	Chile
Sueiro 38'; Serrano 39'	Report

Umpires:
Lance Sarabia (USA)
Gavin Caldecott (CAN)

12 February 2010
12:30

United States	2–1	Canada
Orozco 26'; Zepeda 55'	Report	Curran 45'

Umpires:
Javier Loza (ARG)
Arturo Vázquez (MEX)

=== Classification round ===
==== Third and fourth place ====
13 February 2010
11:00

Canada	1–5	Chile
Johnston 29'	Report	I. Contardo 17'; Köster 22'; Martín 44', 52'; Purcell 68'

Umpires:
Arturo Vázquez (MEX)
Daniel Basto (MEX)

==== Final ====
13 February 2010
13:30

Argentina	2–1	United States
Sacchetti 43'; Sueiro 69'	Report	Kundi 62'

Umpires:
Albert Marcano (TTO)
Gavin Caldecott (CAN)

== Statistics ==
=== Final standings ===
Pos	Team	Pld	W	D	L	GF	GA	GD	Pts
1st place, gold medalist(s)	Argentina	5	5	0	0	17	3	+14	15
2nd place, silver medalist(s)	United States	5	3	0	2	9	8	+1	9
3rd place, bronze medalist(s)	Chile	5	1	1	3	11	13	−2	4
4	Canada	5	2	0	3	7	12	−5	6
5	Mexico	4	0	1	3	5	13	−8	1

Source: PAHF

=== Goalscorers ===
There were 49 goals scored in 10 matches, for an average of 4.9 goals per match.

4 goals

- (Argentina) Nicolás Cicileo
- (Chile) Vicente Martín

3 goals

- (United States) Christian Linney
- (Argentina) Felipe Sueiro
- (Chile) Pablo Purcell

2 goals

- (Mexico) Alexis Campillo
- (Canada) Gabriel Ho-García
- (Canada) Gordon Johnston
- (Argentina) Leonardo Castronovo
- (Argentina) Matías Fernández
- (Chile) Matías Köster
- (United States) Ranveer Kundi
- (Argentina) Santiago Serrano

1 goal

- (United States) Ajaypal Singh
- (Chile) Alan Hamilton
- (United States) Amrit Beatty
- (Canada) Christopher Roydhouse
- (Chile) Ignacio Contardo
- (Argentina) Joaquín Trezza
- (United States) Jonathan Orozco
- (Mexico) Jordy Chávez
- (Canada) Justin Dhaliwal
- (Argentina) Lucas Pérez
- (Mexico) Luís Trillas
- (Argentina) Nicolás Sacchetti
- (United States) Pedro Zepeda
- (Mexico) Ricardo Figueroa
- (Argentina) Sebastián Casini
- (Canada) Spencer Curran
