= 2012 Men's Pan-Am Junior Championship =

Field hockey tournament

2012 Men's Pan American Junior Championship

Tournament details
- Host country: Mexico
- City: Guadalajara
- Dates: 10–23 September
- Teams: 13 (from 1 confederation)
- Venue: Pan American Hockey Stadium

Final positions
- Champions: Argentina (10th title)
- Runner-up: Canada
- Third place: Chile

Tournament statistics
- Matches played: 43
- Goals scored: 318 (7.4 per match)
- Top scorer: (Argentina) Gonzalo Peillat (15 goals)
- Best player: (Argentina) Gonzalo Peillat
- Best goalkeeper: (Canada) Kevin Pereira

The 2012 Men's Pan American Junior Championship was the tenth edition of the men's Pan American Junior Championship. The tournament was held between 10 and 23 September 2012 at the Pan American Hockey Stadium in Guadalajara, Mexico.

The tournament served as a qualifier for the 2013 Junior World Cup, held in New Delhi, India in December 2013.

Argentina won the tournament for the 10th time, defeating Canada 3–2 in the final. Chile won the bronze medal by defeating the United States 3–2 in the third and fourth place playoff.

== Participating nations ==
A total of thirteen teams competed in the tournament:

- Argentina (defending champions)
- Barbados
- Brazil
- Canada
- Chile
- Guatemala
- Jamaica
- Mexico
- Puerto Rico
- Trinidad and Tobago
- United States
- Uruguay
- Venezuela

== Results ==
=== Preliminary round ===
==== Pool A ====
Pos	Team	Pld	W	D	L	GF	GA	GD	Pts	Qualification
1	Argentina	4	4	0	0	46	0	+46	12	Medal Round
2	Trinidad and Tobago	4	3	0	1	30	10	+20	9	Medal Round
3	Brazil	4	1	1	2	7	11	−4	4	
4	Jamaica	4	1	1	2	10	17	−7	4	
5	Guatemala	4	0	0	4	2	57	−55	0	

Source: PAHF

10 September 2012
09:00

Argentina	24–0	Guatemala
Peillat 2', 4', 46', 65'; Martinez 9', 38', 57', 58', 69', 69'; Díaz 12', 49', 56'; Coelho 17', 37', 40'; Ibarra 21', 35'; Monja 30'; Paz 39'; Menini 44', 48', 50'; Sachetti 60'	Report

Umpires:
Donovan Simmons (BER)
Arturo Vasquez Serrano (MEX)

11 September 2012
12:30

Trinidad and Tobago	8–1	Jamaica
Vieira 7', 14', 64'; Grant 10', 35'; Daniel 31', 70'; Marcano 50'	Report	Mitchell 49'

Umpires:
Daniel Lopez Ramos (URU)
Gavin Caldecott (CAN)

12 September 2012
12:30

Argentina	8–0	Jamaica
Peillat 9', 11', 63'; Díaz 21'; Paz 47'; Menini 49'; Fernández 62'; Ruíz 67'	Report

Umpires:
Etma Cerpa (VEN)
Donny Gobinsingh (TTO)

12 September 2012
14:15

Trinidad and Tobago	5–0	Brazil
Campbell 6'; Clarke 17'; Butler 26'; Jaikaransingh 44'; Joseph 48'	Report

Umpires:
David Sweetman (SCO)
Federico Garcia (URU)

13 September 2012
17:45

Brazil	7–1	Guatemala
Paes 2'; Espindola 12'; Borges 15', 69'; Rickenbach 46', 63'; Souza 70'	Report	Velasquez Letona 43'

Umpires:
Nku Davis (TTO)
Ben Peters (USA)

14 September 2012
14:15

Argentina	9–0	Trinidad and Tobago
Sachetti 3', 19'; Peillat 7', 10', 16'; Menini 21'; Fernández 41', 70'; Díaz 67'	Report

Umpires:
Constantine Soteriades (USA)
Gavin Caldecott (CAN)

15 September 2012
16:00

Brazil	0–0	Jamaica
	Report

Umpires:
Arturo Vasquez Serrano (MEX)
Ben Peters (USA)

16 September 2012
09:00

Trinidad and Tobago	17–0	Guatemala
Joseph 7'; Campbell 8', 32'; Daniel 9', 20', 64', 66'; Clarke 11', 41'; Vieira 14', 24', 45', 67'; Marcano 42', 68'; Grant 48'; Pedro 56'	Report

Umpires:
Etmar Cerpa (VEN)
Daniel Basto Rivero (MEX)

16 September 2012
14:15

Argentina	5–0	Brazil
Fernández 3'; Peillat 16', 34'; Coelho 56'; Menini 64'	Report

Umpires:
Duvaughan Henlon (JAM)
Gavin Caldecott (CAN)

17 September 2012
09:00

Jamaica	9–1	Guatemala
Mitchell 3', 15', 18', 37'; Waugh 10', 22'; Dawson 29', 57'; Douglas 43'	Report	Paiz Borrayo 44'

Umpires:
Etmar Cerpa (VEN)
Nku Davis (TTO)

==== Pool B ====
Pos	Team	Pld	W	D	L	GF	GA	GD	Pts	Qualification
1	Canada	3	3	0	0	21	1	+20	9	Medal Round
2	Mexico (H)	3	2	0	1	20	3	+17	6	Medal Round
3	Uruguay	3	1	0	2	3	11	−8	3	
4	Puerto Rico	3	0	0	3	1	30	−29	0	

Source: PAHF
(H) Hosts

10 September 2012
14:15

Canada	12–0	Puerto Rico
Pereira 8', 20', 29'; M. Bissett 12'; Kanerva 14'; Johnston 26'; Ho-Garcia 41', 54'; B. Bissett 55'; Sarmento 59', 66'; Kirkpatrick 60'	Report

Umpires:
Diego Barbas (ARG)
Andres Ledesma (ARG)

11 September 2012
14:15

Mexico	4–0	Uruguay
Rangel 7'; Silva 10', 60'; Pedraza 54'	Report

Umpires:
Donny Gobinsingh (TTO)
Ben Peters (USA)

12 September 2012
16:00

Canada	6–0	Uruguay
Pereira 4'; B. Bissett 14'; Sarmento 37', 49', 67'; Froese 44'	Report

Umpires:
Duvaughan Henlon (JAM)
Diego Barbas (ARG)

13 September 2012
09:00

Mexico	15–0	Puerto Rico
Rangel 5', 10', 58', 63'; Islas 6'; Silva 16'; Trillas 23'; Díaz 24', 34', 59'; Ramírez 27'; Pérez 33'; Pedraza 62', 64', 65'	Report

Umpires:
Duvaughan Henlon (JAM)
Donovan Simmons (BER)

14 September 2012
12:30

Canada	3–1	Mexico
Jones 5'; Ho-Garcia 47'; M. Bissett 57'	Report	Monraz 64'

Umpires:
Nku Davis (TTO)
Diego Barbas (ARG)

14 September 2012
12:30

Uruguay	3–1	Puerto Rico
Matí. Pereiro 19', 32'; Rojas 37'	Report	Nina 56'

Umpires:
Donny Gobinsingh (TTO)
Andres Ledesma (ARG)

==== Pool C ====
Pos	Team	Pld	W	D	L	GF	GA	GD	Pts	Qualification
1	United States	3	3	0	0	12	5	+7	9	Medal Round
2	Chile	3	1	1	1	8	5	+3	4	Medal Round
3	Barbados	3	1	0	2	9	12	−3	3	
4	Venezuela	3	0	1	2	4	11	−7	1	

Source: PAHF

10 September 2012
19:30

United States	5–1	Venezuela
Käppeler 5'; Groeneveld 21', 50'; Sundeen 45'; Linney 62'	Report	Castro 66'

Umpires:
David Sweetman (SCO)
Nku Davis (TTO)

11 September 2012
16:00

Barbados	1–6	Chile
Catlin 14'	Report	I. Contardo 16'; Berczely 31', 66'; Dummer 39'; F. Renz 57'; Purcell 70'

Umpires:
Constantine Soteriades (USA)
Daniel Bastó Rivera (MEX)

13 September 2012
10:45

United States	5–4	Barbados
Käppeler 9', 48'; Kundi 12'; Barminski 22'; Groeneveld 30'	Report	Rudder 6'; Warner 43', 49'; Catlin 70'

Umpires:
Andrés Ledesma (ARG)
Daniel Bastó Rivera (MEX)

13 September 2012
16:00

Chile	2–2	Venezuela
Tapia 32'; F. Renz 68'	Report	Álvarez 7'; C. Vargas 67'

Umpires:
Arturo Vásquez Serrano (MEX)
Federico García (URU)

14 September 2012
16:00

Chile	0–2	United States
	Report	Linney 32'; Pruijs 59'

Umpires:
Daniel López Ramos (URU)
David Sweetman (SCO)

15 September 2012
14:15

Barbados	4–1	Venezuela
Walcott 44'; Rudder 47'; Warner 54'; Catlin 59'	Report	C. Vargas 7'

Umpires:
Donovan Simmons (BER)
Federico García (URU)

=== Medal round ===
==== Pool D ====
Pos	Team	Pld	W	D	L	GF	GA	GD	Pts	Qualification
1	Argentina	2	2	0	0	18	2	+16	6	Final
2	United States	2	1	0	1	7	10	−3	3	Third place game
3	Mexico (H)	2	0	0	2	3	16	−13	0	Fifth place game

Source: PAHF
(H) Hosts

18 September 2012
09:00

Argentina	10–1	Mexico
Ibarra 22', 42'; Sacchetti 38', 39', 42', 55'; Coelho 43', 66'; Peillat 58'; Menini 67'	Report	Monraz 51'

Umpires:
Donny Gobinsingh (TTO)
Nku Davis (TTO)

19 September 2012
09:00

Mexico	2–6	United States
Pérez 28'; Rangel 48'	Report	Linney 9', 12'; Groeneveld 18'; Kentwell 43'; Käppeler 57'; Orozco 70+'

Umpires:
Federico Garcia (URU)
Daniel Lopez Ramos (MEX)

20 September 2012
12:45

Argentina	8–1	United States
Menini 8', 43'; Coelho 10', 60'; Ibarra 24'; Peillat 30'; Fernández 41'; Monja 69'	Report	Käppeler 49'

Umpires:
David Sweetman (SCO)
Gavin Caldecott (CAN)

==== Pool E ====
Pos	Team	Pld	W	D	L	GF	GA	GD	Pts	Qualification
1	Canada	2	2	0	0	13	1	+12	6	Final
2	Chile	2	1	0	1	3	9	−6	3	Third place game
3	Trinidad and Tobago	2	0	0	2	1	7	−6	0	Fifth place game

Source: PAHF

18 September 2012
10:45

Trinidad and Tobago	0–5	Canada
	Report	Pereira 12', 22'; Kanerva 30', 65'; Johnston 42'

Umpires:
Daniel Basto Rivera (MEX)
Andres Ledesma (ARG)

19 September 2012
14:45

Canada	8–1	Chile
Johnston 27', 57', 59'; M. Bissett 40'; Kanerva 41', 48'; Bissett 47'; Froese 58'	Report	Purcell 5'

Umpires:
David Sweetman (SCO)
Diego Barbas (ARG)

20 September 2012
14:30

Trinidad and Tobago	1–2	Chile
Vieira 57'	Report	Purcell 34', 65'

Umpires:
Constantine Soteriades (SCO)
Arturo Vazquez Serrano (MEX)

=== Non-medal round ===
==== Pool F ====
Pos	Team	Pld	W	D	L	GF	GA	GD	Pts
1	Barbados	2	2	0	0	10	5	+5	6
2	Brazil	2	1	0	1	11	5	+6	3
3	Puerto Rico	2	0	0	2	3	14	−11	0

Source: PAHF

17 September 2012
16:00

Puerto Rico	2–6	Barbados
G. Rodríguez 37'; Márquez 59'	Report	Rudder 3', 44'; Warner 45', 52', 56', 67'

Umpires:
Donovan Simmons (BER)
Diego Barbas (ARG)

19 September 2012
18:15

Brazil	8–1	Puerto Rico
Borges 10', 12', 20', 35', 51', 65'; Rickenbach 41'; Roberto Jr. 47'	Report	G. Rodríguez 19'

Umpires:
Donovan Simmons (BER)
Duvaughan Henlon (JAM)

20 September 2012
16:15

Brazil	3–4	Barbados
Espindola 11'; Borges 41', 70'	Report	Rudder 8'; Bovell 28', 52'; Wharton 54'

Umpires:
Benjamin Peters (USA)
Daniel Basto Rivero (MEX)

==== Pool G ====
Pos	Team	Pld	W	D	L	GF	GA	GD	Pts
1	Uruguay	3	3	0	0	13	2	+11	9
2	Venezuela	3	1	1	1	19	8	+11	4
3	Jamaica	3	1	1	1	11	8	+3	4
4	Guatemala	3	0	0	3	1	26	−25	0

Source: PAHF

17 September 2012
17:45

Uruguay	4–1	Venezuela
A. López 16', 42', 51'; Rodríguez 58'	Report	Álvarez 63'

Umpires:
Constantine Soteriades (USA)
Duvaughan Henlon (JAM)

18 September 2012
17:45

Jamaica	4–4	Venezuela
Mitchell 30', 46', 59'; Clarke 32'	Report	C. Vargas 27', 60'; Oropeza 33'; Bracamonte 67'

Umpires:
Arturo Vázquez Serrano (MEX)
Gavin Caldecott (CAN)

18 September 2012
19:30

Uruguay	6–0	Guatemala
Matí. Pereiro 2', 30', 38', 60'; A. López 7'; Maz 69'	Report

Umpires:
Benjamin Peters (USA)
Donovan Simmons (BER)

19 September 2012
16:30

Jamaica	6–1	Guatemala
Mitchell 15', 23', 65'; Waugh 17'; Hendricks 55'; Thomas 57'	Report	Ávila 69'

Umpires:
Donny Gobinsingh (TTO)
Arturo Vázquez Serrano (MEX)

21 September 2012
14:45

Jamaica	1–3	Uruguay
Campbell 55'	Report	A. López 19'; Mate. Pereiro 62', 64'

Umpires:
Donovan Simmons (BER)
Nku Davis (TTO)

21 September 2012
16:30

Venezuela	14–0	Guatemala
Álvarez 2', 29', 48', 61'; Bracamonte 5', 12', 15'; C. Vargas 20', 39', 62'; Oropeza 34', 44'; Perdomo 47'; Simanca 49'	Report

Umpires:
Arturo Vázquez Serrano (MEX)
Gavin Caldecott (CAN)

=== Classification matches ===
==== Eleventh and twelfth place ====
22 September 2012
09:00

Puerto Rico	1–3	Jamaica
G. Rodríguez 45'	Report	Mitchell 14', 50'; Campbell 37'

Umpires:
David Sweetman (SCO)
Nku Davis (TTO)

==== Ninth and tenth place ====
22 September 2012
11:00

Brazil	3–2 (a.e.t.)	Venezuela
Paes 18'; Guest 60'; Paixão 73'	Report	Castro 49', 66'

Umpires:
Constantine Soteriades (USA)
Benjamin Peters (USA)

==== Seventh and eighth place ====
22 September 2012
13:00

Barbados	3–3	Uruguay
Warner 34', 42'; Bovell 47'	Report	A. López 2', 35'; Mate. Pereiro 51'
Penalties
Rudder (penalty shoot-out scored); Catlin (penalty shoot-out scored); Taylor (penalty shoot-out missed); Callender (penalty shoot-out missed); Warner (penalty shoot-out scored)	3–2	(penalty shoot-out scored) Canessa; (penalty shoot-out scored) Matí. Pereiro; (penalty shoot-out missed) Mate. Pereiro; (penalty shoot-out missed) A. Lopez; (penalty shoot-out missed) Rodríguez

Umpires:
Donny Gobinsingh (TTO)
Duvaughan Henlon (JAM)

==== Fifth and sixth place ====
22 September 2012
15:00

Mexico	3–4 (a.e.t.)	Trinidad and Tobago
Rangel 21', 61'; Pedraza 44'	Report	Daniel 6', 66'; Clarke 14'; Vieira 72'

Umpires:
Daniel Lopez Ramos (URU)
Andres Ledesma (ARG)

==== Third and fourth place ====
23 September 2012
09:00

United States	2–3 (a.e.t.)	Chile
Käppeler 57'; Sundeen 68'	Report	Purcell 39', 60'; Martín 76'

Umpires:
Gavin Caldecott (CAN)
Arturo Vazquez Serrano (MEX)

==== Final ====
23 September 2012
11:00

Argentina	3–2	Canada
Menini 35'; Peillat 45'; Coelho 50'	Report	Johnston 15'; Kirkpatrick 36'

Umpires:
Federico Garcia (URU)
Daniel Basto Rivero (MEX)

== Final standings ==
Pos	Team	Pld	W	D	L	GF	GA	GD	Pts	Qualification
1st place, gold medalist(s)	Argentina	7	7	0	0	67	4	+63	21	2013 FIH Junior World Cup
2nd place, silver medalist(s)	Canada	6	5	0	1	36	5	+31	15	2013 FIH Junior World Cup
3rd place, bronze medalist(s)	Chile	6	3	1	2	14	16	−2	10	
4	United States	6	4	0	2	21	18	+3	12	
5	Trinidad and Tobago	7	4	0	3	35	20	+15	12	
6	Mexico (H)	6	2	0	4	26	23	+3	6	
7	Barbados	6	3	1	2	22	20	+2	10	
8	Uruguay	7	4	1	2	19	16	+3	13	
9	Brazil	7	3	1	3	21	18	+3	10	
10	Venezuela	7	1	2	4	25	22	+3	5	
11	Jamaica	8	3	2	3	24	26	−2	11	
12	Puerto Rico	6	0	0	6	5	47	−42	0	
13	Guatemala	7	0	0	7	3	83	−80	0	

Source: PAHF
(H) Hosts

== Goalscorers ==
There were 318 goals scored in 43 matches, for an average of 7.4 goals per match.

15 goals

- (Argentina) Gonzalo Peillat

13 goals

- (Jamaica) Kemar Mitchell

10 goals

- (Argentina) Joaquín Menini
- (Brazil) Matheus Borges

9 goals

- (Argentina) Joaquín Coelho
- (Barbados) Ché Warner
- (Trinidad and Tobago) Andrew Vieira

8 goals

- (Mexico) Andrés Rangel
- (Trinidad and Tobago) Shaquille Daniel

7 goals

- (Argentina) Nicolás Sachetti
- (Uruguay) Alexis López
- (Venezuela) Christian Vargas

6 goals

- (Argentina) Lucas Martínez
- (Canada) Gordon Johnston
- (Canada) Keegan Pereira
- (Chile) Pablo Purcell
- (United States) Aki Käppeler
- (Uruguay) Matías Pereiro
- (Venezuela) Nelson Álvarez

5 goals

- (Argentina) Lautaro Díaz
- (Argentina) Federico Fernández
- (Argentina) Isidoro Ibarra
- (Barbados) Akeem Rudder
- (Canada) Andrew Kanerva
- (Canada) Matthew Sarmento
- (Mexico) Guillermo Pedraza

4 goals

- (Trinidad and Tobago) Quinn Clarke
- (United States) Austin Groeneveld
- (United States) Christian Linney
- (Venezuela) Wilber Bracamonté

3 goals

- (Barbados) Kamar Bovell
- (Barbados) Justin Catlin
- (Brazil) Fabien Rickenbach
- (Canada) Matthew Bissett
- (Canada) Gabriel Ho-Garcia
- (Jamaica) Leon Waugh
- (Mexico) José Díaz
- (Mexico) Jesús Silva
- (Puerto Rico) Gabriel Rodríguez
- (Trinidad and Tobago) Ishmael Campbell
- (Trinidad and Tobago) Nicholas Grant
- (Trinidad and Tobago) Tariq Marcano
- (Uruguay) Mateo Pereiro
- (Venezuela) Yordano Castro
- (Venezuela) José Oropeza

2 goals

- (Argentina) Federico Monja
- (Argentina) Diego Paz
- (Brazil) Ralf Espindola
- (Brazil) Bruno Paes
- (Canada) Brenden Bissett
- (Canada) Adam Froese
- (Canada) James Kirkpatrick
- (Chile) Jan Berczely
- (Chile) Fernando Renz
- (Jamaica) Giovanne Campbell
- (Jamaica) Phillip Dawson
- (Mexico) Roberto Monraz
- (Mexico) Jaime Pérez
- (Trinidad and Tobago) Shakiel Joseph
- (United States) Tyler Sundeen

1 goal

- (Argentina) Federico Ruíz
- (Barbados) Jabari Walcott
- (Barbados) Shonkeel Wharton
- (Brazil) Matthew Guest
- (Brazil) Lucas Paixão
- (Brazil) Paulo Roberto Jr.
- (Brazil) Murilo Souza
- (Canada) Stephen Bissett
- (Canada) Samuel Jones
- (Chile) Ignacio Contardo
- (Chile) Mathias Drummer
- (Chile) Vicente Martín
- (Chile) Felipé Tapia
- (Guatemala) Erik Ávila
- (Guatemala) Kristhian Velásquez
- (Guatemala) César Paíz
- (Jamaica) Brandon Clarke
- (Jamaica) Clive Douglas
- (Jamaica) Xavier Hendricks
- (Jamaica) Oshane Thomas
- (Mexico) José Islas
- (Mexico) Luis Ramírez
- (Mexico) Luis Trillas
- (Puerto Rico) Bryan Márquez
- (Puerto Rico) Fitzgerald Niña
- (Trinidad and Tobago) Cogie Butler
- (Trinidad and Tobago) Dominic Jaikaransingh
- (Trinidad and Tobago) Chad Pedro
- (United States) Michael Barminski Jr.
- (United States) Jaja Kentwell
- (United States) Ranveer Kundi
- (United States) Jonathan Orozco
- (United States) Rutger Pruijs
- (Uruguay) Gabriel Maz
- (Uruguay) Joaquín Rodríguez
- (Uruguay) Gonzalo Rojas
- (Venezuela) Darwin Perdomo
- (Venezuela) Raudin Simanca

Source: PAHF
