= Nicolás Renz =

Chilean field hockey player

Personal information
- Full name: Nicolás Renz Boher
- Born: 7 April 1995 (age 31) Santiago, Chile
- Height: 178 cm (5 ft 10 in)
- Weight: 69 kg (152 lb)

Sport
- Sport: Field hockey
- Position: Midfield
- Club: Club Manquehue
National team
Years	Team	Caps	Goals
2012–2016	Chile U–21	49	(12)
2012–	Chile	80	(30)
Medal record
Men's field hockey
Representing Chile
Pan American Games
Bronze medal – third place	2015 Toronto	Team
South American Games
Silver medal – second place	2014 Santiago	Team
Silver medal – second place	2018 Cochabamba	Team
Pan American Junior Championship
Bronze medal – third place	2012 Guadalajara	Team
Bronze medal – third place	2016 Toronto	Team

Nicolás Renz Boher (born 7 April 1995) is a Chilean field hockey player.

== Personal life ==
Nicolás Renz is the middle child, with brothers Fernando and Felipe also representing Chile.

Renz studied at the Pontificia Universidad Católica de Chile.

== Career ==
=== Junior national team ===
In 2012 Renz made his debut for the Chilean U–21 team at the Pan American Junior Championship in Guadalajara, where he won a bronze medal.

He went on to represent the team numerous times. In 2016, he won a second bronze medal with the team at his second Pan American Junior Championship in Toronto.

=== Los Diablos ===
Nicolás Renz made his debut for Los Diablos in 2012, during the inaugural edition of the FIH World League.

In 2014, Renz won his first medal with the national team, at the South American Games in Santiago. The following year, he won bronze at the 2015 Pan American Games in Toronto. He won his second South American Games medal in 2018, taking silver at the tournament.

Renz was also a member of the national team at the 2019 Pan American Games in Lima.
