= James Kirkpatrick (field hockey) =

Canadian field hockey player (born 1991)

Personal information
- Full name: James Alexander Paget Kirkpatrick
- Born: March 29, 1991 (age 35) Victoria, British Columbia, Canada
- Height: 1.74 m (5 ft 9 in)

Sport
- Sport: Field hockey
- Position: Midfielder / Forward
- Club: West Vancouver
National team
Years	Team	Caps	Goals
2010–present	Canada	199	(8)
Medal record
Men's field hockey
Representing Canada
Pan American Games
Silver medal – second place	2019 Lima	Team
Pan American Cup
Bronze medal – third place	2022 Santiago
Pan American Junior Championship
Silver medal – second place	2012 Guadalajara
- Updated on 24 July 2021

James Alexander Paget Kirkpatrick (born March 29, 1991) is a Canadian field hockey player who plays as a midfielder or forward for West Vancouver and the Canadian national team.

He also played club hockey in France for Racing Club de France.

== International career ==
Kirkpatrick represented Canada at the 2018 World Cup, where he played all four games. In June 2019, he was selected in the Canada squad for the 2019 Pan American Games. They won the silver medal as they lost 5–2 to Argentina in the final.

In June 2021, Kirkpatrick was named to Canada's 2020 Summer Olympics team.
