= Brenden Bissett =

Canadian field hockey player (born 1993)

Brenden Bisset
Personal information
- Full name: Brenden David Nelson Bissett
- Born: 28 January 1993 (age 33) Vancouver, British Columbia, Canada
- Height: 1.78 m (5 ft 10 in)
- Weight: 73 kg (161 lb)

Sport
- Sport: Field hockey
- Position: Midfielder / Forward
- Club: Vancouver Hawks
Senior career
Years	Team	Caps	Goals
2017–2018	Nijmegen	-	-
2018–	Vancouver Hawks	-	-
National team
Years	Team	Caps	Goals
2014–	Canada	139	(11)
Medal record
Men's field hockey
Representing Canada
Pan American Games
Silver medal – second place	2015 Toronto	Team
Silver medal – second place	2019 Lima	Team
Pan American Cup
Silver medal – second place	2017 Lancaster
Bronze medal – third place	2022 Santiago
Pan American Junior Championship
Silver medal – second place	2012 Guadalajara
- Updated on 24 July 2021

Brenden David Nelson Bissett (born January 28, 1993) is a Canadian field hockey player who plays as a midfielder or forward for the Vancouver Hawks and the Canadian national team.

== Club career ==
Since 2017, he played club hockey in the Netherlands for NMHC Nijmegen. After one season he returned to Canada to the Vancouver Hawks.

== International career ==
He competed at the 2015 Pan American Games and won a silver medal. In 2016, he was named to Canada's Olympic team. He was selected for the 2018 World Cup, where he played all four games. In June 2019, he was selected in the Canada squad for the 2019 Pan American Games. They won the silver medal as they lost 5–2 to Argentina in the final.

In June 2021, Bissett was named to Canada's 2020 Summer Olympics team.
