= José Maldonado (field hockey) =

Chilean field hockey player (born 1994)

Personal information
- Full name: José Pedro Maldonado Maira
- Born: 4 November 1994 (age 31) Chile

Sport
- Sport: Field hockey
- Position: Midfielder
- Club: Toorak East Malvern HC
National team
Years	Team	Caps	Goals
2013–	Chile	67	(25)
Medal record
Men's field hockey
Representing Chile
Pan American Cup
Silver medal – second place	2022 Santiago
South American Games
Silver medal – second place	2014 Santiago	Team

José Pedro Maldonado Maira (born 4 November 1994) is a Chilean field hockey player.

== Personal life ==
José Maldonado comes from a hockey family, with his sister María also being a Chile international.

== Career ==
=== Junior National Team ===
Maldonado was a member of the Chile Under 18 side at the 2010 Youth Olympics in Singapore.

=== Senior National Team ===
Maldonado made his senior international debut in 2013, in a Tri-Nations tournament in Elektrostal, Russia.

Since his debut, Maldonado has been a regular inclusion in the national team. His most notable performance was as a member of the team that won the Hockey Series Open in Santiago in September 2018.
