= Vicente Martín =

Chilean field hockey player

Personal information
- Full name: Vicente Martín Tarud
- Born: 18 December 1993 (age 32) Chile
- Height: 184 cm (6 ft 0 in)
- Weight: 68 kg (150 lb)

Sport
- Sport: Field hockey
- Position: Defence
- Club: Club Manquehue
National team
Years	Team	Caps	Goals
2010	Chile U–18	11	(7)
2012	Chile U–21	6	(1)
2013–	Chile	57	(30)
Medal record
Men's field hockey
Representing Chile
Pan American Games
Bronze medal – third place	2015 Toronto	Team
South American Games
Silver medal – second place	2014 Santiago	Team
Silver medal – second place	2018 Cochabamba	Team
Pan American Junior Championship
Bronze medal – third place	2012 Guadalajara	Team

Vicente Martín Tarud (born 18 December 1993) is a Chilean field hockey player.

== Career ==
=== Club level ===
Vicente Martín currently plays for Club Manquehue in the Chilean national competition.

During his career, he has also represented English club, Beeston HC.

=== Junior national teams ===
==== Under–18 ====
Martín made his first appearance for Chile in 2010, for the national U–18 team at the Pan American Youth Championship in Hermosillo. He followed this up with an appearance at the Youth Olympic Games in Singapore.

==== Under–21 ====
In 2012 Martín made his debut for the Chilean U–21 team at the Pan American Junior Championship in Guadalajara, where he won a bronze medal.

=== Los Diablos ===
Martín made his debut for Los Diablos in 2013 at the Pan American Cup in Brampton.

He has medalled three times in his senior career. He has won two silver medals at the South American Games, at the 2014 and 2018 editions in Santiago and Cochabamba, respectively. In 2015 he took won a bronze medal at the Pan American Games in Toronto.
