= Field hockey at the 2015 Pan American Games – Men's tournament =

Men's field hockey at the 2015 Pan American Games
Tournament details
- Host country: Canada
- City: Toronto
- Dates: 14–25 July
- Teams: 8 (from 1 confederation)
- Venue(s): Pan Am / Parapan Am Fields

Final positions
- Champions: Argentina (9th title)
- Runner-up: Canada
- Third place: Chile

Tournament statistics
- Matches played: 24
- Goals scored: 136 (5.67 per match)
- Top scorer(s): (Argentina) Gonzalo Peillat (14 goals)

The men's field hockey tournament at the 2015 Pan American Games was held in Toronto, Canada at the Pan Am / Parapan Am Fields from July 14 to 25.

For these Games, the men competed in an 8-team tournament. The teams were grouped into two pools of four teams each for a round-robin preliminary round. All teams will advance to an eight team single elimination bracket.

Argentina were the defending champions from the 2011 Pan American Games in Guadalajara, defeating Canada, 3–1 in the final.

The winner of this tournament, if not already qualified, qualified for the 2016 Summer Olympics in Rio de Janeiro.

== Qualification ==
A total of eight men's teams qualified to compete at the games. The top two teams at the South American and Central American and Caribbean Games qualified for the tournament. The host nation (Canada) automatically qualified as well. The remaining three spots were given to the three best teams from the 2013 Pan American Cup that had not qualified yet. This happened after the two qualification tournaments in 2014 were played. Each nation may enter one team (16 athletes per team).

=== Summary ===
Event	Date	Location	Quotas	Qualifier(s)
Host	—	—	1	Canada
2013 Pan American Cup	10–17 August 2013	(Canada) Brampton	3	United States; Mexico; Brazil
2014 South American Games	8–16 March 2014	(Chile) Santiago	2	Argentina; Chile
2014 Central American and Caribbean Games	16–24 November 2014	(Mexico) Veracruz	2	Cuba; Trinidad and Tobago
Total			8	

== Pools ==
Pools were based on the world rankings as of January 21, 2015. Teams were placed into pools using the serpentine system. Teams ranked 1, 4, 5 and 8 would be in Pool A, while teams ranked 2, 3, 6 and 7 would be in Pool B.

Rankings are listed in parentheses.

Pool A	Pool B
Argentina (6); United States (27); Trinidad and Tobago (30); Cuba (48)	Canada (16); Chile (25); Brazil (33); Mexico (36)

== Rosters ==
At the start of the tournament, all eight participating countries had up to 16 players on their rosters.

- Argentina
- Brazil
- Canada
- Chile
- Cuba
- Mexico
- Trinidad and Tobago
- United States

== Competition format ==
In the first round of the competition, teams were divided into two pools of four teams, and play followed round robin format with each of the teams playing all other teams in the pool once. Teams were awarded three points for a win, one point for a draw and zero points for a loss.

Following the completion of the pool games, all eight teams advanced to a single elimination round consisting of four quarterfinal games, two semifinal games, and the bronze and gold medal matches. Losing teams competed in classification matches to determine their ranking in the tournament. A penalty stroke competition took place, if a classification match ended in a draw, to determine a winner.

All games were played in four 15 minute quarters.

== Medalists ==
Event	Gold	Silver	Bronze
Men's tournament	Argentina; Juan Manuel Vivaldi; Gonzalo Peillat; Juan Gilardi; Pedro Ibarra; Facundo Callioni; Matías Paredes; Joaquin Menini; Lucas Vila; Ignacio Ortiz; Juan Martín López; Nicolas Della Torre; Isidoro Ibarra; Matias Rey; Manuel Brunet; Agustin Mazzili; Lucas Rossi	Canada; Brenden Bissett; David Carter; Taylor Curran; Adam Froese; Matthew Guest; Gabriel Ho-Garcia; David Jameson; Gordon Johnston; Ben Martin; Devohn Noronha-Teixeira; Sukhi Panesar; Mark Pearson; Matthew Sarmento; Iain Smythe; Scott Tupper; Paul Wharton	Chile; Richardo Achondo; Prada A. Berczely; Fernando Binder Wiener; Felipe Eggers; Andrés Fuenzalida; Ignacio Gajardo; Adrián Henríquez; Thomás Kannegiesser; Sebastián Kapsch; Vicente Martín Tarud; Fernando Renz; Nicolás Renz; Sven Richter; Martín Rodríguez; Raimundo Valenzuela; Jaime Zarhi

== Results ==
The official schedule was revealed on February 18, 2015.

All times are Eastern Daylight Time (UTC−4)

=== Preliminary round ===
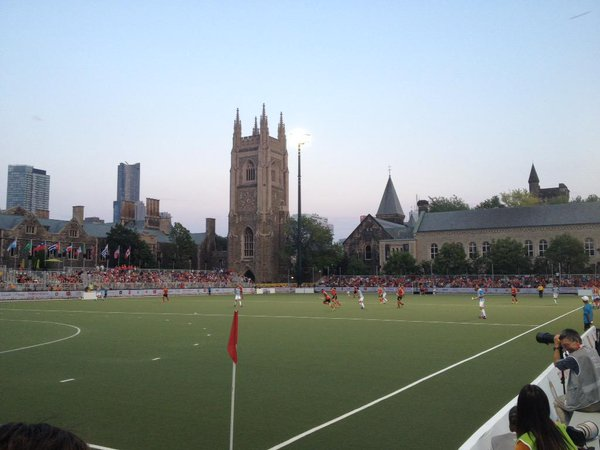
The Pan Am / Parapan Am Fields at the University of Toronto's back campus, was the venue for the men's field hockey tournament

==== Pool A ====
Pos	Team	Pld	W	D	L	GF	GA	GD	Pts	Qualification
1	Argentina	3	3	0	0	22	4	+18	9	Quarter-finals
2	United States	3	1	1	1	5	10	−5	4	Quarter-finals
3	Cuba	3	0	2	1	9	10	−1	2	Quarter-finals
4	Trinidad and Tobago	3	0	1	2	3	15	−12	1	Quarter-finals

Source: FIH
Rules for classification: 1) points; 2) matches won; 3) goal difference; 4) goals for; 5) head-to-head result.

14 July 2015
09:00

Argentina	11–0	Trinidad and Tobago
Peillat 26', 57'; Vila 29', 30', 34'; Paredes 37'; Della Torre 42'; Mazzili 56'; Callioni 57', 60'; Menini 59'	Report

Umpires:
You Suolong (CHN)
Federico Garcia (URU)

14 July 2015
11:00

United States	3–3	Cuba
Runzi 9'; Käppeler 24'; Holt 28'	Report	Tritzant 32'; Blanco 51', 59'

Umpires:
Matias Barbosa (CHI)
David Sweetman (GBR)

16 July 2015
09:00

Trinidad and Tobago	2–2	Cuba
Toussaint 51'; Eccles 59'	Report	Blanco 22', 53'

Umpires:
Daniel Basto Rivero (MEX)
Grant Hundley (USA)

16 July 2015
11:00

United States	0–6	Argentina
	Report	Mazzili 15'; Brunet 19'; Peillat 38', 47'; Callioni 41'; Della Torre 54'

Umpires:
Francisco Vázquez (ESP)
Gavin Caldecott (CAN)

18 July 2015
09:00

Argentina	5–4	Cuba
Vila 18'; Peillat 28', 37', 55'; Menini 29'	Report	Blanco 21'; Veitia 47', 57'; Aguilera 52'

Umpires:
Gavin Caldecott (CAN)
Matias Barbosa (CHI)

18 July 2015
11:00

Trinidad and Tobago	1–2	United States
Campbell 14'	Report	Holt 6'; Grassi 13'

Umpires:
Francisco Vázquez (ESP)
You Suolong (CHN)

==== Pool B ====
Pos	Team	Pld	W	D	L	GF	GA	GD	Pts	Qualification
1	Canada (H)	3	3	0	0	18	2	+16	9	Quarter-finals
2	Chile	3	2	0	1	6	4	+2	6	Quarter-finals
3	Brazil	3	1	0	2	3	12	−9	3	Quarter-finals
4	Mexico	3	0	0	3	3	12	−9	0	Quarter-finals

Source: FIH
Rules for classification: 1) points; 2) matches won; 3) goal difference; 4) goals for; 5) head-to-head result.
(H) Hosts

14 July 2015
17:00

Chile	3–2	Mexico
Richter 25'; Martín 34'; Rodríguez 56'	Report	Campillo 2'; Pedraza 55'

Umpires:
Grant Hundley (USA)
Donny Gobinsingh (TTO)

14 July 2015
19:00

Canada	9–1	Brazil
Bissett 8'; Tupper 17'; Pearson 28', 35'; Ho-Garcia 31'; Froese 34'; Guest 39', 44'; Wharton 50'	Report	Borges 9'

Umpires:
Andres Ledesma (ARG)
Francisco Vázquez (ESP)

16 July 2015
17:00

Brazil	1–0	Mexico
Paixao 44'	Report

Umpires:
You Suolong (CHN)
Donny Gobinsingh (TTO)

16 July 2015
19:00

Chile	0–1	Canada
	Report	Pearson 6'

Umpires:
Federico Garcia (URU)
Saleem Aaron (USA)

18 July 2015
17:00

Brazil	1–3	Chile
Borges 42'	Report	N. Renz 11'; Richter 14'; Rodríguez 40'

Umpires:
Saleem Aaron (USA)
Grant Hundley (USA)

18 July 2015
19:00

Canada	8–1	Mexico
Ho-Garcia 6', 14', 52', 54'; Sarmento 31', 47'; Guest 38'; Wharton 55'	Report	Campillo 36'

Umpires:
Federico Garcia (URU)
Andres Ledesma (ARG)

=== Classification round ===
Quarter-finals
21 July
Argentina	12
Mexico	0
21 July
Chile	6
Cuba	2
21 July
United States	1 (1)
Brazil (s.o.)	1 (3)
21 July
Canada	3
Trinidad and Tobago	0

Semi-finals
23 July
Argentina	6
Chile	0
23 July
Brazil	0 (3)
Canada (s.o.)	0 (5)

Gold medal match
25 July
Argentina	3
Canada	0
Bronze medal match
25 July
Chile	4
Brazil	1

==== Quarter-finals ====
21 July 2015
09:00

Argentina	12–0	Mexico
Brunet 2'; Peillat 7', 28', 30', 59'; Paredes 18', 39'; Vila 20', 31', 51'; Gilardi 39'; Mazzili 56'	Report

Umpires:
Saleem Aaron (USA)
Matias Barbosa (CHI)

21 July 2015
11:30

Chile	6–2	Cuba
Prada 38'; Richter 43'; F. Renz 46'; Martín 47', 60'; Rodríguez 57'	Report	Blanco 15'; Tritzant 51'

Umpires:
You Suolong (CHN)
Andres Ledesma (ARG)

21 July 2015
17:00

United States	1–1	Brazil
Sundeen 57'	Report; Penalties	Borges 34'
Penalties
Harris (penalty shoot-out missed); Runzi (penalty shoot-out missed); Linney (penalty shoot-out scored); Cunningham (penalty shoot-out missed)	1–3	(penalty shoot-out scored) Paixão; (penalty shoot-out scored) Y. van der Heijden; (penalty shoot-out scored) Sousa; (penalty shoot-out missed) P. van der Heijden

Umpires:
Federico Garcia (URU)
Gavin Caldecott (CAN)

21 July 2015
19:30

Canada	3–0	Trinidad and Tobago
Smythe 3'; Sarmento 29'; Tupper 50'	Report

Umpires:
Francisco Vázquez (ESP)
Grant Hundley (USA)

==== Fifth to eighth place classification ====
Cross-overs
23 July
Mexico	3
Cuba	1
23 July
United States	2
Trinidad and Tobago	1

Fifth place
25 July
Mexico	2
United States	6
Seventh place
25 July
Cuba	0
Trinidad and Tobago	13

===== Cross-overs =====
23 July 2015
09:00

Mexico	3–1	Cuba
Campillo Lopez 29'; Pedraza Saenz 32'; García Miranda 50'	Report	Gutierrez 43'

Umpires:
Donny Gobinsingh (TTO)
Francisco Vázquez (ESP)

23 July 2015
11:00

United States	2–1	Trinidad and Tobago
Holt 27'; Sundeen 38'	Report	Marcano 36'

Umpires:
Gavin Caldecott (CAN)
Matias Barbosa (CHI)

===== Seventh and eighth place =====
25 July 2015
09:00

Cuba	0–13	Trinidad and Tobago
	Report	Pierre 5', 13', 26'; Reynos 6', 47'; Murray 20', 35', 46'; Emmanuel 28'; Gilkes 31', 33'; Campbell 43'; Mouttet 44'

Umpires:
Matias Barbosa (CHI)
Saleem Aaron (USA)

===== Fifth and sixth place =====
25 July 2015
11:00

Mexico	2–6	United States
Garcia Lopez 19'; Borquez Silva 30'	Report	Holt 3', 11', 17'; Barminski 22'; Harris 45'; Sundeen 51'

Umpires:
Gavin Caldecott (CAN)
Donny Gobinsingh (TTO)

==== Semi-finals ====
23 July 2015
17:00

Argentina	6–0	Chile
Vila 6'; Peillat 30', 42', 44'; Paredes 44'; Brunet 60'	Report

Umpires:
Suolong You (CHN)
Federico Garcia (URU)

23 July 2015
19:00

Brazil	0–0	Canada
	Report; Penalties
Penalties
Y. van der Heijden (penalty shoot-out scored); P. van der Heijden (penalty shoot-out scored); Felipe Réus (penalty shoot-out missed); Smith (penalty shoot-out scored)	3–5	(penalty shoot-out scored) Pearson; (penalty shoot-out scored) Noronha-Teixeira; (penalty shoot-out scored) Panesar; (penalty shoot-out scored) Johnston; (penalty shoot-out scored) Froese

Umpires:
Andres Ledesma (ARG)
Saleem Aaron (USA)

==== Bronze medal match ====
25 July 2015
17:00

(bronze) Chile	4–1	Brazil
N. Renz 5', 32'; Kannegiesser 19'; Martín 20'	Report	Smith 60'

Umpires:
Andres Ledesma (ARG)
Grant Hundley (USA)

==== Gold medal match ====
25 July 2015
19:00

(gold) Argentina	3–0	Canada (silver)
Ibarra 25'; Vila 33'; Brunet 47'	Report

Umpires:
Francisco Vázquez (ESP)
Federico Garcia (URU)

== Final standings ==
As per statistical convention in field hockey, matches decided in extra time are counted as wins and losses, while matches decided by penalty shoot-outs are counted as draws.

Pos	Grp	Team	Pld	W	D	L	GF	GA	GD	Pts	Final result
1st place, gold medalist(s)	A	Argentina	6	6	0	0	43	4	+39	18	Gold medal
2nd place, silver medalist(s)	B	Canada (H)	6	4	1	1	21	5	+16	13	Silver medal
3rd place, bronze medalist(s)	B	Chile	6	4	0	2	16	13	+3	12	Bronze medal
4	B	Brazil	6	1	2	3	5	17	−12	5	Fourth place
5	A	United States	6	3	2	1	14	14	0	11	Eliminated in quarterfinals
6	B	Mexico	6	1	0	5	8	31	−23	3	Eliminated in quarterfinals
7	A	Trinidad and Tobago	6	1	1	4	17	20	−3	4	Eliminated in quarterfinals
8	A	Cuba	6	0	2	4	12	32	−20	2	Eliminated in quarterfinals

Source: FIH
(H) Hosts

== Goalscorers ==
There were 136 goals scored in 24 matches, for an average of 5.67 goals per match.

14 goals

- (Argentina) Gonzalo Peillat

9 goals

- (Argentina) Lucas Vila

6 goals

- (Cuba) Yoandy Blancó
- (United States) William Holt

5 goals

- (Canada) Gabriel Ho-Garcia

4 goals

- (Argentina) Manuel Brunet
- (Argentina) Matías Paredes
- (Chile) Vicente Martín

3 goals

- (Argentina) Facundo Callioni
- (Argentina) Agustín Mazzilli
- (Brazil) Matheus Borges
- (Canada) Matthew Guest
- (Canada) Mark Pearson
- (Canada) Matthew Sarmento
- (Chile) Sven Richter
- (Chile) Nicolás Renz
- (Chile) Martín Rodríguez
- (Mexico) Alexis Campillo
- (Trinidad and Tobago) Kiel Murray
- (Trinidad and Tobago) Mickel Pierre
- (United States) Tyler Sundeen

2 goals

- (Argentina) Nicolás Della Torre
- (Argentina) Joaquín Menini
- (Canada) Scott Tupper
- (Canada) Paul Wharton
- (Cuba) Maikel Tritzant
- (Cuba) Yoel Veitia
- (Mexico) Guillermo Pedraza
- (Trinidad and Tobago) Ishmael Campbell
- (Trinidad and Tobago) Dillet Gilkes
- (Trinidad and Tobago) Jordan Reynos

1 goal

- (Argentina) Juan Ignacio Gilardi
- (Argentina) Pedro Ibarra
- (Brazil) Lucas Paixão
- (Brazil) Stephane Vehrle-Smith
- (Canada) Brenden Bissett
- (Canada) Adam Froese
- (Canada) Iain Smythe
- (Chile) Thomás Kannegiesser
- (Chile) Alexis Prada
- (Chile) Felipe Renz
- (Cuba) Roger Aguilera
- (Mexico) Edgar Borqúez
- (Mexico) Edgar García
- (Mexico) Ricardo García
- (Mexico) Yasmany Gutiérrez
- (Trinidad and Tobago) Solomon Eccles
- (Trinidad and Tobago) Kristien Emmanuel
- (Trinidad and Tobago) Tariq Marcano
- (Trinidad and Tobago) Stefan Mouttet
- (Trinidad and Tobago) Akim Toussaint
- (United States) Michael Barminski
- (United States) Alex Grassi
- (United States) Patrick Harris
- (United States) Aki Käppeler
- (United States) Moritz Runzi

== See also ==
- Field hockey at the 2016 Summer Olympics – Men's tournament
