= Keegan Pereira (field hockey) =

Canadian field hockey player (born 1991)

Personal information
- Full name: Keegan Reginald Pereira
- Born: September 8, 1991 (age 34) Mumbai, India
- Height: 1.66 m (5 ft 5 in)
- Weight: 59 kg (130 lb)

Sport
- Sport: Field hockey
- Position: Midfielder / Forward
Senior career
Years	Team	Caps	Goals
–	Victoria Vikes	-	-
–	UBC Thunderbirds	-	-
–2016	Royal Wellington	-	-
2016–2019	Uhlenhorst Mülheim	-	-
National team
Years	Team	Caps	Goals
2009–present	Canada	195	(36)
Medal record
Men's field hockey
Representing Canada
Pan American Games
Silver medal – second place	2011 Guadalajara	Team
Silver medal – second place	2019 Lima	Team
Bronze medal – third place	2023 Santiago	Team
Pan American Cup
Silver medal – second place	2013 Brampton
Silver medal – second place	2017 Lancaster
Bronze medal – third place	2022 Santiago
Pan American Junior Championship
Silver medal – second place	2012 Guadalajara
- Updated on 1 February 2022

Keegan Reginald Pereira (born September 8, 1991) is an Indian-born Canadian field hockey player, who plays as a midfielder or forward for the Canadian national team.

== Club career ==
Pereira played for the Victoria Vikes and UBC Thunderbirds before he moved to Europe to play for Royal Wellington in Belgium. In 2016, he moved to Germany to play for Uhlenhorst Mülheim, with whom he won two Bundesliga titles.

== International career ==
He competed at the 2014 Commonwealth Games. In 2016, he was named to Canada's Olympic team. Pereira has played in two World Cups, in 2010 and 2018. In June 2019, he was selected in the Canada squad for the 2019 Pan American Games. They won the silver medal as they lost 5–2 to Argentina in the final.

In June 2021, Pereira was named to Canada's 2020 Summer Olympics team.
