= Fernando Renz =

Chilean field hockey player

Personal information
- Full name: Fernando Andrés Renz Boher
- Born: 15 February 1994 (age 32) Santiago, Chile
- Height: 176 cm (5 ft 9 in)
- Weight: 65 kg (143 lb)

Sport
- Sport: Field hockey
- Position: Midfield/Forward
- Club: Club Manquehue
National team
Years	Team	Caps	Goals
2010	Chile U–18	11	(0)
2012	Chile U–21	6	(2)
2014–	Chile	64	-
Medal record
Men's field hockey
Representing Chile
Pan American Games
Bronze medal – third place	2015 Toronto	Team
Pan American Cup
Silver medal – second place	2022 Santiago
South American Games
Silver medal – second place	2018 Cochabamba	Team
Pan American Junior Championship
Bronze medal – third place	2012 Guadalajara

Fernando Andrés Renz Boher (Note: In this Spanish name, the first or paternal surname is Renz and the second or maternal family name is Boher.) (born 15 February 1994) is a Chilean field hockey player.

== Personal life ==
Fernando Renz is the oldest of three brothers, with siblings Nicolás and Felipe also representing Chile.

Renz studied at the Universidad de Chile.

== Career ==
=== Junior national teams ===
==== Under–18 ====
Fernando Renz made his appearance for Chile in 2010, for the national U–18 team at the Pan American Youth Championship in Hermosillo. He followed this up with an appearance at the Youth Olympic Games in Singapore.

==== Under–21 ====
In 2012 Renz made his debut for the Chilean U–21 team at the Pan American Junior Championship in Guadalajara, where he won a bronze medal.

=== Los Diablos ===
Fernando Renz made his debut for Los Diablos in 2014, during a test series against the United States in Chula Vista.

In 2015 he won his first medal with the national team, winning bronze at the 2015 Pan American Games in Toronto.

He won his first South American Games medal in 2018, taking silver at the tournament. In 2019, he was also a member of the national team at the 2019 Pan American Games in Lima. He also competed at the 2022 South American Games held in Asunción, Paraguay. He was one of the flag bearers for Chile during the opening ceremony of the 2022 South American Games.
