= Adam Froese =

Canadian field hockey player (born 1991)

Personal information
- Full name: Adam Frank Froese
- Born: 13 August 1991 (age 34) Subang Jaya, Malaysia

Sport
- Sport: Field hockey
- Position: Defender / Midfielder
- Club: India Club
National team
Years	Team	Caps	Goals
2010–	Canada	189	-
Medal record
Men's field hockey
Representing Canada
Pan American Games
Silver medal – second place	2011 Guadalajara	Team
Silver medal – second place	2015 Toronto	Team
Silver medal – second place	2019 Lima	Team
Pan American Cup
Silver medal – second place	2013 Brampton
Pan American Junior Championship
Silver medal – second place	2012 Guadalajara
- Updated on 12 August 2019

Adam Frank Froese (born August 13, 1991) is a Canadian field hockey player who plays as a defender or midfielder for India Club and the Canadian national team.

== International career ==
Froese played for the Canada national field hockey team at the 2015 Pan American Games and won a silver medal. In 2016, he was named to Canada's Olympic team. In June 2019, he was selected in the Canada squad for the 2019 Pan American Games, which will be his third Pan American Games. They won the silver medal as they lost 5–2 to Argentina in the final.
