= Isidoro Ibarra =

Argentine field hockey player

Personal information
- Full name: Isidoro Carlos Ibarra
- Born: 2 October 1992 (age 33) Victoria, Buenos Aires, Argentina

Sport
- Sport: Field hockey
- Position: Defender / Midfielder
- Club: San Fernando
Senior career
| Years | Team | Caps | Goals |
| – | San Fernando | - | - |
| –2017 | Beerschot | - | - |
| 2017–2018 | Leuven | - | - |
| 2018–2019 | San Fernando | - | - |
| 2019–2020 | Antwerp | - | - |
| 2020–present | San Fernando | - | - |
National team
| Years | Team | Caps | Goals |
| 2015–present | Argentina | 51 | - |
Medal record
Men's field hockey
Representing Argentina
Olympic Games
| Gold medal – first place | 2016 Rio de Janeiro | Team |
Pan American Games
| Gold medal – first place | 2015 Toronto | Team |
Pan American Junior Championship
| Gold medal – first place | 2012 Guadalajara |
- Updated on 17 March 2021

Isidoro Carlos Ibarra (born 2 October 1992) is an Argentine field hockey player who plays as a defender or midfielder for San Fernando and the Argentine national team.

He has played 51 caps for the Argentine national team. He competed in the field hockey competition at the 2016 Summer Olympics, where he won the gold medal.

== Club career ==
Ibarra played for San Fernando in Argentina and then for Royal Beerschot in Belgium until 2017 when he transferred to another Belgian club, Leuven. In 2018 he returned to San Fernando. After one season in Argentina, he went back to Belgium to play for Royal Antwerp.
