= Benjamin Martin (field hockey) =

Canadian field hockey player

Personal information
- Born: April 18, 1987 (age 39) Vancouver, British Columbia
- Height: 182 cm (5 ft 11 1/2 in)
- Weight: 75 kg (165 lb)

Sport
- Country: Canada
- Sport: Field hockey
Medal record
Men's field hockey
Representing Canada
Pan American Games
Silver medal – second place	2015 Toronto	Team

Benjamin Martin (born April 18, 1987, in Vancouver, British Columbia) is a male field hockey player, who played for the Canada national field hockey team at the 2015 Pan American Games and won a silver medal.

In 2016, he was named to Canada's Olympic team.
