= Mark Pearson (field hockey) =

Canadian field hockey player

Personal information
- Full name: Mark Alistair John Pearson
- Born: June 18, 1987 (age 39) Vancouver, British Columbia, Canada
- Height: 1.75 m (5 ft 9 in)
- Weight: 78 kg (172 lb)

Sport
- Sport: Field hockey
- Position: Forward
National team
Years	Team	Caps	Goals
2005–2021	Canada	284	(71)
Medal record
Men's field hockey
Representing Canada
Pan American Games
Silver medal – second place	2011 Guadalajara	Team
Silver medal – second place	2015 Toronto	Team
Silver medal – second place	2019 Lima	Team
Pan American Cup
Silver medal – second place	2013 Brampton

Mark Alistair John Pearson (born June 18, 1987) is a Canadian retired field hockey player. He has represented Canada in three Summer Olympics and two World Cups.

From 2009, he played for Der Club an der Alster, Hamburg, Germany.

== International career ==
In 2016, he was named to Canada's Olympic team. In June 2019, he was selected in the Canada squad for the 2019 Pan American Games. They won the silver medal as they lost 5–2 to Argentina in the final.

In June 2021, Pearson was named to Canada's 2020 Summer Olympics team. He announced his retirement from the national team in December 2021.
