= Scott Tupper =

Canadian field hockey player

Personal information
- Full name: Scott William Martin Tupper
- Born: December 16, 1986 (age 39) Vancouver, British Columbia, Canada
- Height: 1.79 m (5 ft 10 in)
- Weight: 79 kg (174 lb)

Sport
- Sport: Field hockey
- Position: Defender
National team
Years	Team	Caps	Goals
2005–2021	Canada	322	(126)
Medal record
Pan American Games
Gold medal – first place	2007 Rio de Janeiro	Team
Silver medal – second place	2011 Guadalajara	Team
Silver medal – second place	2015 Toronto	Team
Silver medal – second place	2019 Lima	Team
Pan American Cup
Silver medal – second place	2013 Brampton
Silver medal – second place	2017 Lancaster

Scott William Martin Tupper (born December 16, 1986) is a Canadian former field hockey player who played as a defender.

== Club career ==
Born in Vancouver, British Columbia, Tupper first started playing with the Vancouver Hawks Field Hockey Club at the age of eight. Scott Tupper is known for his deadly drag flicks and short corners. Vancouver's one and only Field Hockey Iron Man. In the last few years, he's played mainly as a Central Defender, capable of launching 50-yard aerial passes to his forwards. His home club is the West Vancouver Field Hockey Club. He's also played semi-professionally in Europe with ZSV Schaerweijde, Der Club an der Alster and Racing Bruxelles.

== International career ==
In 2016, he was named to Canada's Olympic team. In June 2019, he was selected in the Canada squad for the 2019 Pan American Games. They won the silver medal as they lost 5–2 to Argentina in the final.

In June 2021, Tupper was named to Canada's 2020 Summer Olympics team. After the 2020 Summer Olympics he retired from the national program as the top goalscorer with 126 goals.
