= Matías Rey =

Argentine field hockey player (born 1984)

Personal information
- Full name: Matías Alejandro Rey
- Born: 1 December 1984 (age 41) Buenos Aires, Argentina
- Height: 1.79 m (5 ft 10 in)
- Weight: 73 kg (161 lb)

Sport
- Sport: Field hockey
- Position: Defender
- Club: San Fernando
Senior career
Years	Team	Caps	Goals
–2005	San Fernando	-	-
2005–2020	Real Club de Polo	-	-
2020–present	San Fernando	-	-
National team
Years	Team	Caps	Goals
2006–present	Argentina	259	-
Medal record
Men's field hockey
Representing Argentina
Olympic Games
Gold medal – first place	2016 Rio de Janeiro	Team
World Cup
Bronze medal – third place	2014 The Hague
Bronze medal – third place	2026 Wavre/Amstelveen
Pan American Games
Gold medal – first place	2015 Toronto	Team
Gold medal – first place	2019 Lima	Team
Gold medal – first place	2023 Santiago	Team
Silver medal – second place	2007 Rio de Janeiro	Team
Pan American Cup
Gold medal – first place	2013 Brampton
Gold medal – first place	2017 Lancaster
Gold medal – first place	2022 Santiago
Gold medal – first place	2025 Montevideo
South American Games
Gold medal – first place	2022 Asunción	Team
Champions Trophy
Bronze medal – third place	2008 Rotterdam
Hockey World League
Silver medal – second place	2016–17 Bhubaneswar	Team
- Updated on 6 February 2023

Matías Alejandro Rey (born 1 December 1984) is an Argentine field hockey player who plays as a defender for the Argentine national team.

Rey joined Real Club de Polo in Spain in 2005 and after fifteen consecutive seasons, he will return to Argentina at the end of 2020.

== International career ==
He competed in the field hockey competition at the 2016 Summer Olympics, where he won the gold medal. In July 2019, he was selected in the Argentina squad for the 2019 Pan American Games. They won the gold medal by defeating Canada 5–2 in the final. He was named the Player of the Tournament at the 2022 Men's Pan American Cup where he won his third Pan American Cup with the national team.
