= Pablo Purcell =

Chilean field hockey player (born 1993)

Personal information
- Full name: Juan Pablo Purcell Salas
- Born: 23 June 1993 (age 33) Chile

Sport
- Sport: Field hockey
- Position: Defence
Senior career
Years	Team	Caps	Goals
–	Prince of Wales Country Club	-	-
National team
Years	Team	Caps	Goals
2012	Chile U–21	6	(6)
2013–	Chile	80	(16)
Medal record
Men's field hockey
Representing Chile
Pan American Cup
Silver medal – second place	2022 Santiago	Team
South American Games
Silver medal – second place	2018 Cochabamba	Team
Pan American Junior Championship
Bronze medal – third place	2012 Guadalajara	Team

Juan Pablo Purcell Salas (born 23 June 1993) is a field hockey player from Chile.

== Career ==
=== Junior national team ===
Pablo Purcell made his debut for the Chile U–21 team in 2012 at the Pan American Junior Championship. He was Chile's top scorer of the tournament, scoring six in their bronze medal-winning campaign.

=== Los Diablos ===
Purcell made his senior debut for Chile in 2013 at the South American Championship in Santiago.

Since his debut, Purcell has been a regular inclusion in the national squad. He has medalled with the team on numerous occasions, including silver at the South American Games in 2018, as well as the 2022 Pan American Cup.

In 2019 he was a member of the team at the Pan American Games in Lima.
