= Matthew Sarmento =

Canadian field hockey player (born 1991)

Personal information
- Full name: Matthew Brandon Sarmento
- Born: June 23, 1991 (age 35) Vancouver, British Columbia, Canada
- Height: 1.74 m (5 ft 9 in)
- Weight: 76 kg (168 lb)

Sport
- Sport: Field hockey
- Position: Forward
Senior career
Years	Team	Caps	Goals
–	Victoria Vikes	-	-
–	UBC Thunderbirds	-	-
2017–2018	Leuven	-	-
National team
Years	Team	Caps	Goals
2013–present	Canada	134	(27)
Medal record
Men's field hockey
Representing Canada
Pan American Games
Silver medal – second place	2015 Toronto	Team
Pan American Cup
Silver medal – second place	2013 Brampton
Silver medal – second place	2017 Lancaster
Bronze medal – third place	2022 Santiago
Bronze medal – third place	2025 Montevideo
Pan American Junior Championship
Silver medal – second place	2012 Guadalajara
- Updated on 24 July 2021

Matthew Brandon Sarmento (born June 23, 1991) is a Canadian field hockey player, who plays as a forward for the Canadian national team.

== Club career ==
Sarmento played in Canada for the Victoria Vikes and the UBC Thunderbirds. In 2017 he went to Europe to play for KHC Leuven in Belgium.

== International career ==
Sarmento competed at the 2015 Pan American Games and won a silver medal.

In 2016, he was named to Canada's Olympic team. He made his World Cup debut at the 2018 World Cup, where he played in all four games.

In June 2021, Sarmento was named to Canada's 2020 Summer Olympics team.
