= Daniel Castillo =

Chilean footballer

Personal information
- Full name: Daniel Alexis Castillo Lavín
- Date of birth: 23 October 1990 (age 36)
- Place of birth: Concepción, Chile
- Height: 1.84 m (6 ft 0 in)
- Position: Goalkeeper

Team information
- Current team: Deportes Iquique
- Number: 12

Youth career
- Universidad de Concepción

Senior career*
Years	Team	Apps	(Gls)
2009–2018	Universidad de Concepción	4	(0)
2012	→ Lota Schwager (loan)	4	(0)
2013–2014	→ Malleco Unido (loan)	22	(0)
2014–2015	→ Lota Schwager (loan)	31	(0)
2019–2021	Deportes Puerto Montt	50	(0)
2021–	Deportes Iquique	105	(0)
- * Club domestic league appearances and goals as of 1 September 2025

Daniel Alexis Castillo Lavín (born 23 October 1990) is a Chilean footballer who plays as a goalkeeper for Chilean Primera División side Deportes Iquique.

== Club career ==
Born in Concepción, Chile, Castillo was trained at Universidad de Concepción and promoted to the first team by Jorge Pellicer in 2009 after Federico Elduayen injured.

After having no chances to play as the third goalkeeper, he was loaned out to Lota Schwager and Malleco Unido between 2012 and 2015. Back to Universidad de Concepción, he made his debut with them in the 2016 Torneo Apertura.

In 2019, Castillo moved to Deportes Puerto Montt and left them at the end of the 2020 season. On 1 March 2021, he switched to Deportes Iquique, getting promotion to the 2024 Chilean Primera División. The main starting goalkeeper during 2024, he renewed with them for the 2025 season.
