= Gordon Johnston (field hockey) =

Canadian field hockey player (born 1993)

Personal information
- Full name: Gordon MacKenzie Johnston
- Born: January 30, 1993 (age 33) Vancouver, Canada
- Height: 1.87 m (6 ft 2 in)
- Weight: 88 kg (194 lb)

Sport
- Sport: Field hockey
- Position: Defender
Senior career
Years	Team	Caps	Goals
–	Royal Wellington	-	-
–2021	Vancouver Hawks	-	-
2021–2022	HGC	-	-
National team
Years	Team	Caps	Goals
2011–present	Canada	201	(123)
Medal record
Men's field hockey
Representing Canada
Pan American Games
Silver medal – second place	2015 Toronto	Team
Silver medal – second place	2019 Lima	Team
Bronze medal – third place	2023 Santiago	Team
Pan American Cup
Silver medal – second place	2017 Lancaster
Bronze medal – third place	2022 Santiago
Pan American Junior Championship
Silver medal – second place	2012 Guadalajara
- Updated on 31 October 2023

Gordon MacKenzie Johnston (born January 30, 1993) is a Canadian field hockey player, who plays as a defender for the Canadian national team.

== Club career ==
Johnston joined HGC in the Dutch Hoofdklasse in 2021 after the 2020 Summer Olympics after having played for the Vancouver Hawks. He played one season at HGC.

== International career ==
He was part of the Canadian squad that competed at the 2015 Pan American Games and won a silver medal. In 2016, he was named to Canada's Olympic team. He was selected for the 2018 World Cup, where he played all four games. In June 2019, he was selected in the Canada squad for the 2019 Pan American Games. They won the silver medal as they lost 5–2 to Argentina in the final.

In June 2021, Johnston was named to Canada's 2020 Summer Olympics team. He was the top goalscorer at the 2022 Men's Pan American Cup with ten goals as Canada won the bronze medal.
