= Matheus Borges =

Brazilian field hockey player (born 1993)

Personal information
- Born: 20 July 1993 (age 33)

Sport
- Country: Brazil
- Sport: Field hockey

Matheus Borges (born 20 July 1993) is a Brazilian field hockey player. He competed in the men's field hockey tournament at the 2016 Summer Olympics.
