= Bruno Paes (field hockey) =

Brazilian field hockey player (born 1993)

Personal information
- Full name: Bruno Bitencourt Paes
- Born: 24 June 1993 (age 33)

Sport
- Sport: Field hockey
- Club: Florianópolis
National team
| Years | Team | Caps | Goals |
| 2013– | Brazil | 79 | - |
Medal record
Men's field hockey
Representing Brazil
South American Games
| Bronze medal – third place | 2018 Cochabamba | Team |
South American Championship
| Bronze medal – third place | 2013 Santiago |

Bruno Bitencourt Paes (born 24 June 1993) is a Brazilian field hockey player.

Paes competed in the men's field hockey tournament at the 2016 Summer Olympics.
