= 2022 Men's Pan American Cup (field hockey) =

International field hockey competition

Tournament details
- Host country: Chile
- City: Santiago
- Dates: 20–30 January
- Teams: 7 (from 1 confederation)
- Venue: Prince of Wales Country Club

Final positions
- Champions: Argentina (4th title)
- Runner-up: Chile
- Third place: Canada

Tournament statistics
- Matches played: 16
- Goals scored: 93 (5.81 per match)
- Top scorer: (Canada) Gordon Johnston (10 goals)
- Best player: (Argentina) Matías Rey
- Best goalkeeper: (Mexico) Gonzalo Segura

The 2022 Men's Pan American Cup was the sixth edition of the Men's Pan American Cup, the quadrennial international men's field hockey championship of the Americas organised by the Pan American Hockey Federation.

It was planned to be held alongside the women's tournament from 7 to 22 August 2021 in Tacarigua, Trinidad and Tobago. However, following the postponement of the 2020 Summer Olympics to July and August 2021 because of the COVID-19 pandemic the tournament was rescheduled and on 4 September 2020 the hosts Trinidad and Tobago withdrew from hosting the tournament. In November 2020, Pan American Hockey Federation announced that the cup was going to be held from 20 to 30 January 2022 in Santiago, Chile.

Argentina were the defending champions, winning the 2017 edition. They defended their title as they won the tournament for the fourth time by defeating the hosts Chile 5–1 in the final. As finalists the two teams qualified for the 2023 FIH Hockey World Cup.

== Qualification ==
The top six teams from the previous Pan American Cup, the host if not already qualified and the winner of the 2021 Pan American Challenge qualified for the tournament.

| Dates | Event | Location | Quotas | Qualifier(s) |
|---|---|---|---|---|
| —N/a | Host | —N/a | 0 | – (Note: Chile already qualified by finishing in the top six at the 2017 Pan American Cup so that quota was added to the 2021 Pan American Challenge.) |
| 4–12 August 2017 | 2017 Pan American Cup | Lancaster, United States | 6 | Argentina; Brazil; Canada; Chile; Trinidad and Tobago; United States |
| 26 September – 2 October 2021 | 2021 Pan American Challenge | Lima, Peru | 1 | Mexico; ~~Peru~~ |
| Total | | | 7 | |

Peru withdrew before the tournament, due to several positive COVID-19 tests in their team.

== Preliminary round ==
All times are local (UTC−4).

=== Pool A ===
| Pos | Team | Pld | W | D | L | GF | GA | GD | Pts | Qualification |
|---|---|---|---|---|---|---|---|---|---|---|
| 1 | Argentina | 2 | 2 | 0 | 0 | 13 | 2 | +11 | 6 | Semi-finals |
| 2 | Chile (H) | 2 | 1 | 0 | 1 | 7 | 3 | +4 | 3 | Cross-overs |
| 3 | Brazil | 2 | 0 | 0 | 2 | 0 | 15 | −15 | 0 | Cross-overs |
| 4 | Peru (Note: Peru withdrew before the start of the tournament.) | 0 | 0 | 0 | 0 | 0 | 0 | 0 | 0 | Withdrawn |

Source: FIH
Rules for classification: 1) points; 2) matches won; 3) goal difference; 4) goals for; 5) head-to-head result; 6) field goals scored.
(H) Hosts
Notes:

20 January 2022
18:30

| Argentina | 10–0 | Brazil |
|---|---|---|
| Casella 4', 24', 29', 43'; Tolini 9'; Martínez 20'; Della Torre 26'; Domene 28'; Tarazona 35'; Bugallo 59' | Report |

Umpires:
Renier Díaz (CUB)
Kevin George (TTO)

22 January 2022
18:30

| Chile | 2–3 | Argentina |
|---|---|---|
| Becerra 4'; Contardo 19' | Report | Martínez 34', 53'; Casella 59' |

Umpires:
Benjamin Peters (USA)
Jonathan Altamirano (MEX)

24 January 2022
18:30

| Brazil | 0–5 | Chile |
|---|---|---|
| | Report | Contardo 4'; Enos 11'; Hurtardo 20'; Amoroso 30', 42' |

Umpires:
Benjamin Peters (USA)
Jonathan Altamirano (MEX)

=== Pool B ===
| Pos | Team | Pld | W | D | L | GF | GA | GD | Pts | Qualification |
|---|---|---|---|---|---|---|---|---|---|---|
| 1 | United States | 3 | 3 | 0 | 0 | 13 | 5 | +8 | 9 | Semi-finals |
| 2 | Canada | 3 | 2 | 0 | 1 | 17 | 5 | +12 | 6 | Cross-overs |
| 3 | Mexico | 3 | 1 | 0 | 2 | 6 | 20 | −14 | 3 | Cross-overs |
| 4 | Trinidad and Tobago | 3 | 0 | 0 | 3 | 7 | 13 | −6 | 0 | |

Source: FIH
Rules for classification: 1) points; 2) matches won; 3) goal difference; 4) goals for; 5) head-to-head result; 6) field goals scored.

20 January 2022
14:00

| Canada | 11–1 | Mexico |
|---|---|---|
| Van Son 11', 44'; Johnston 17', 33', 48'; Boothroyd 19'; Pereira 22'; Scholfield 26'; Kirkpatrick 40'; Sarmento 40'; Guraliuk 55' | Report | J. Aguilar 52' |

Umpires:
Guillermo Poblete (CHI)
Oliver Höck (BRA)

20 January 2022
16:15

| United States | 4–3 | Trinidad and Tobago |
|---|---|---|
| K. Käppeler 12'; Heller 42'; A. Käppeler 45+', 54' | Report | Vieiera 15'; Ta. Marcano 44'; Daniel 45' |

Umpires:
Gabriel Labate (ARG)
Hugo Romero (PAR)

22 January 2022
14:00

| Mexico | 4–2 | Trinidad and Tobago |
|---|---|---|
| Gómez 6', 37', 56'; González 59' | Report | Te. Marcano 16'; Daniel 60' |

Umpires:
Hugo Romero (PAR)
Oliver Höck (BRA)

22 January 2022
16:15

| United States | 2–1 | Canada |
|---|---|---|
| Heldens 27'; Kokolakis 50' | Report | Johnston 51' |

Umpires:
Federico Silva (ARG)
Renier Díaz (CUB)

24 January 2022
14:00

| Canada | 5–2 | Trinidad and Tobago |
|---|---|---|
| Scholfield 5'; Johnston 12', 36', 44'; Barnett 40' | Report | Toussaint 17', 26' |

Umpires:
Federico Silva (ARG)
Guillermo Poblete (CHI)

24 January 2022
16:15

| Mexico | 1–7 | United States |
|---|---|---|
| F. Aguilar | Report | Montilla 26', 39'; K. Käppeler 42', 55'; De Angelis 48'; Kokolakis 48'; Heller 50' |

Umpires:
Gabriel Labate (ARG)
Kevin George (TTO)

== Classification round ==
=== Bracket ===
Cross-overs
26 January
Canada | 4
Brazil | 0
26 January
Chile | 3
Mexico | 1

Semi-finals
28 January
Argentina | 5
Canada | 2
28 January
United States | 0 (1)
Chile (p.s.o.) | 0 (3)

Final
30 January
Argentina | 5
Chile | 1
Third place
30 January
Canada | 3
United States | 1

=== Cross-overs ===
26 January 2022
17:00

| Canada | 4–0 | Brazil |
|---|---|---|
| Johnston 11', 59'; Boothroyd 28'; Pereira 32' | Report |

Umpires:
Hugo Romero (PAR)
Kevin George (TTO)

26 January 2022
19:30

| Chile | 3–1 | Mexico |
|---|---|---|
| Amoroso 36'; Hurtado 40'; Maldonado 59' | Report | Sosa 20' |

Umpires:
Renier Díaz (CUB)
Oliver Höck (BRA)

=== Fifth and sixth place ===
28 January 2022
14:30

| Brazil | 1–4 | Mexico |
|---|---|---|
| Patrocínio 48' | Report | F. Aguilar 28'; Castillo 33'; González 40'; Amador 42' |

Umpires:
Hugo Romero (PAR)
Guillermo Poblete (CHI)

=== Semi-finals ===
28 January 2022
17:00

| Argentina | 5–2 | Canada |
|---|---|---|
| Tolini 20', 40'; Fernandez 41'; Domene 52'; Casella 60' | Report | Noronha 55'; Sarmento 55' |

Umpires:
Benjamin Peters (USA)
Jonathan Altamirano (MEX)

28 January 2022
18:30

| United States | 0–0 | Chile |
|---|---|---|
| | Report |
Penalties
| K. Käppeler (penalty shoot-out scored); Dhadwal (penalty shoot-out missed); Harris (penalty shoot-out missed); Montilla (penalty shoot-out missed) | 1–3 | (penalty shoot-out scored) Amoroso; (penalty shoot-out missed) Pizarro; (penalty shoot-out scored) Becerra; (penalty shoot-out scored) Gesswein |

Umpires:
Gabriel Labate (ARG)
Federico Silva (ARG)

=== Third and fourth place ===
30 January 2022
14:30

| Canada | 3–1 | United States |
|---|---|---|
| Boothroyd 34'; Johnston 41'; Barnett 44' | Report | Heldens 17' |

Umpires:
Federico Silva (ARG)
Renier Díaz (CUB)

=== Final ===
30 January 2022
17:00

| Argentina | 5–1 | Chile |
|---|---|---|
| Tarazona 33'; Casella 34', 60'; Tolini 53'; Ferreiro 56' | Report | Fel. Renz 41' |

Umpires:
Benjamin Peters (USA)
Jonathan Altamirano (MEX)

== Statistics ==
=== Final standings ===
| Pos | Team | Qualification |
|---|---|---|
| 1st place, gold medalist(s) | Argentina | 2023 FIH Hockey World Cup |
| 2nd place, silver medalist(s) | Chile (H) | 2023 FIH Hockey World Cup |
| 3rd place, bronze medalist(s) | Canada | |
| 4 | United States | |
| 5 | Mexico | |
| 6 | Brazil | |
| 7 | Trinidad and Tobago | |

Source: FIH
(H) Host

=== Awards ===
| Top goalscorer | Player of the tournament | Goalkeeper of the tournament |
|---|---|---|
| (Canada) Gordon Johnston | (Argentina) Matías Rey | (Mexico) Gonzalo Segura |

=== Goalscorers ===
There were 93 goals scored in 16 matches, for an average of 5.81 goals per match.

10 goals

- (Canada) Gordon Johnston

8 goals

- (Argentina) Maico Casella

4 goals

- (Argentina) Leandro Tolini

3 goals

- (Argentina) Lucas Martínez
- (Canada) Fin Boothroyd
- (Chile) Juan Amoroso
- (Mexico) Jorge Gómez
- (United States) Kei Käppeler

2 goals

- (Argentina) Tomas Domene
- (Argentina) Santiago Tarazona
- (Canada) Matthew Barnett
- (Canada) Keegan Pereira
- (Canada) Matthew Sarmento
- (Canada) Oliver Scholfield
- (Canada) Floris van Son
- (Chile) Ignacio Contardo
- (Chile) Jose Hurtado
- (Mexico) Francisco Aguilar
- (Mexico) Guillermo González
- (Trinidad and Tobago) Joel Daniel
- (Trinidad and Tobago) Akim Toussaint
- (United States) Jack Heldens
- (United States) Vincent Heller
- (United States) Aki Käppeler
- (United States) Kai Kokolakis
- (United States) Alberto Montilla

1 goal

- (Argentina) Agustín Bugallo
- (Argentina) Nicolás Della Torre
- (Argentina) Federico Fernandez
- (Argentina) Martín Ferreiro
- (Brazil) André Patrocínio
- (Canada) Brendan Guraliuk
- (Canada) James Kirkpatrick
- (Canada) Devohn Noronha-Teixeira
- (Chile) Franco Becera
- (Chile) William Enos
- (Chile) Jose Maldonado
- (Chile) Felipe Renz
- (Mexico) Jorge Aguilar
- (Mexico) Kevin Amador
- (Mexico) Daniel Castillo
- (Mexico) Juan Sosa
- (Trinidad and Tobago) Tariq Marcano
- (Trinidad and Tobago) Teague Marcano
- (Trinidad and Tobago) Jordan Vieira
- (United States) Christian de Angelis

Source: FIH

== See also ==
- 2022 Women's Pan American Cup
