= 2012–13 Men's FIH Hockey World League Final =

Field hockey tournament

Tournament details
- Host country: India
- City: New Delhi
- Teams: 8
- Venue: Dhyan Chand National Stadium

Final positions
- Champions: Netherlands (1st title)
- Runner-up: New Zealand
- Third place: England

Tournament statistics
- Matches played: 24
- Goals scored: 114 (4.75 per match)
- Top scorer: (Australia) Kieran Govers (6 goals)
- Best player: (Netherlands) Robbert Kemperman

The 2012–13 Men's FIH Hockey World League Final took place between 10–18 January 2014 in New Delhi, India.

The Netherlands won the tournament for the first time after defeating New Zealand 7–2 in the final. England won the third place match by defeating Australia 2–1.

== Qualification ==
The host nation qualified automatically in addition to 7 teams qualified from the Semifinals. The following eight teams, shown with final pre-tournament rankings, competed in this round of the tournament.

Dates	Event	Location	Quotas	Qualifier(s)
	Host nation		1	India (10)
13–23 June 2013	2012–13 FIH Hockey World League Semifinals	Rotterdam, Netherlands	4	Belgium (5); Australia (2); Netherlands (3); New Zealand (7)
29 June–7 July 2013	2012–13 FIH Hockey World League Semifinals	Johor Bahru, Malaysia	3	Germany (1); Argentina (11); England (4)
Total			8	

== Umpires ==
Below are the 10 umpires appointed by the International Hockey Federation:

- Murray Grime (AUS)
- Marcin Grochal (POL)
- Andrew Kennedy (ENG)
- Kim Hong-lae (KOR)
- Satoshi Kondo (JAP)
- Germán Montes de Oca (ARG)
- Raghu Prasad (IND)
- Gary Simmonds (RSA)
- Gregory Uyttenhove (BEL)
- Roel van Eert (NED)

== Results ==
All times are Indian Standard Time (UTC+05:30)

=== First round ===
==== Pool A ====
Pos	Team	Pld	W	D	L	GF	GA	GD	Pts
1	England	3	3	0	0	9	2	+7	9
2	Germany	3	1	1	1	10	6	+4	4
3	New Zealand	3	1	0	2	5	12	−7	3
4	India	3	0	1	2	4	8	−4	1

Source: FIH
Rules for classification: 1) points; 2) goal difference; 3) goals scored; 4) head-to-head result.

10 January 2014
18:00

Germany	6–1	New Zealand
Wesley 1'; Stralkowski 11', 44'; Fuchs 31'; Hauke 45'; Rabente 48'	Report	Russell 5'

Umpires:
Murray Grime (AUS)
Marcin Grochal (POL)

10 January 2014
20:00

England	2–0	India
Dixon 28', 45'	Report

Umpires:
Gary Simmonds (RSA)
German Montes de Oca (ARG)

11 January 2014
18:00

England	2–1	Germany
Carson 4'; Jackson 21'	Report	Miltkau 11'

Umpires:
Kim Hong-Lae (KOR)
Roel van Eert (NED)

11 January 2014
20:00

New Zealand	3–1	India
McAleese 1'; Jenness 40', 57'	Report	Mandeep 68'

Umpires:
Satoshi Kondo (JPN)
Andrew Kennedy (ENG)

13 January 2014
14:00

New Zealand	1–5	England
Inglis 57'	Report	Jackson 30', 44'; Gleghorne 50'; Carson 67'; Middleton 70'

Umpires:
Gary Simminds (RSA)
Raghu Prasad (IND)

13 January 2014
20:00

Germany	3–3	India
Korn 18'; 41'; Stralkowski 68'	Report	19'; Rupinder Pal 33'; Dharamvir 52'

Umpires:
Marcin Grochal (POL)
Satoshi Kondo (JPN)

==== Pool B ====
Pos	Team	Pld	W	D	L	GF	GA	GD	Pts
1	Australia	3	2	0	1	9	4	+5	6
2	Argentina	3	2	0	1	9	10	−1	6
3	Netherlands	3	1	1	1	5	7	−2	4
4	Belgium	3	0	1	2	6	8	−2	1

Source: FIH
Rules for classification: 1) points; 2) goal difference; 3) goals scored; 4) head-to-head result.

10 January 2014
14:00

Australia	3–2	Belgium
Govers 33', 48'; Whetton 69'	Report	Boon 33'; Briels 53'

Umpires:
Roel van Eert (NED)
Kim Hong-Lae (KOR)

10 January 2014
16:00

Netherlands	2–5	Argentina
Van der Weerden 5'; Van Ass 50'	Report	Peillat 2'; Callioni 8'; Ibarra 56'; Barreiros 60'; Gilardi 67'

Umpires:
Andrew Kennedy (ENG)
Gregory Uyttenhove (BEL)

11 January 2014
14:00

Belgium	2–3	Argentina
Boon 6', 34'	Report	Ibarra 22'; Paredes 50'; Callioni 61'

Umpires:
Murray Grime (AUS)
Gary Simmonds (RSA)

11 January 2014
16:00

Netherlands	1–0	Australia
Bakker 38'	Report

Umpires:
Marcin Grochal (POL)
German Montes de Oca (ARG)

13 January 2014
16:00

Australia	6–1	Argentina
Beale 3'; Knowles 11'; Govers 14', 35'; Ford 44'; Wilson 48'	Report	Callioni 32'

Umpires:
Roel van Eert (NED)
Gregory Uyttenhove (BEL)

13 January 2014
18:00

Netherlands	2–2	Belgium
Jonker 31'; Hertzberger 66'	Report	Boon 34'; Denayer 52'

Umpires:
German Montes de Oca (ARG)
Andrew Kennedy (ENG)

=== Second round ===
Quarter-finals
15 January 2014
England	1
Belgium	0
15 January 2014
Argentina	1 (3)
New Zealand (p.s.o)	1 (4)
15 January 2014
Germany	1
Netherlands	2
15 January 2014
Australia	7
India	2

Semi-finals
17 January 2014
England	3 (6)
New Zealand (p.s.o)	3 (7)
17 January 2014
Netherlands	4
Australia	3

Final
18 January 2014
New Zealand	2
Netherlands	7
Third place
18 January 2014
England	2
Australia	1

==== Quarterfinals ====
15 January 2014
13:15

England	1–0	Belgium
Carson 47'	Report

Umpires:
Roel van Eert (NED)
German Montes de Oca (ARG)

15 January 2014
15:30

Germany	1–2	Netherlands
Korn 38'	Report	Van der Weerden 1'; Van Ass 6'

Umpires:
Murray Grime (AUS)
Kim Hong-Lae (KOR)

15 January 2014
17:45

Argentina	1–1	New Zealand
Paredes 59'	Report	Russell 8'
Penalties
Ibarra (penalty shoot-out missed); Callioni (penalty shoot-out missed); Mazzilli (penalty shoot-out scored); Vila (penalty shoot-out missed); M. Rey (penalty shoot-out scored); Mazzilli (penalty shoot-out scored); Vila (penalty shoot-out missed)	3–4	(penalty shoot-out missed) Inglis; (penalty shoot-out scored) Hilton; (penalty shoot-out missed) Child; (penalty shoot-out missed) Burrows; (penalty shoot-out scored) Edwards; (penalty shoot-out scored) Inglis; (penalty shoot-out scored) Hilton

Umpires:
Gary Simmonds (RSA)
Marcin Grochal (POL)

15 January 2014
20:00

Australia	7–2	India
Budgeon 24'; Wilson 29'; Turner 35'; Ford 41', 47'; Orchard 45'; Whetton 65'	Report	Lakra 6'; Walmiki 11'

Umpires:
Andrew Kennedy (ENG)
Gregory Uyttenhove (BEL)

==== Fifth to eighth place classification ====
Crossover
17 January 2014
Belgium	1 (3)
Argentina	1 (1)
17 January 2014
Germany	4
India	5

Fifth place
18 January 2014
Belgium	2
India	1
Seventh place
18 January 2014
Argentina	1
Germany	2

===== Crossover =====
17 January 2014
13:15

Belgium	1–1	Argentina
56'	Report	M. Rey 31'
Penalties
Gougnard (penalty shoot-out scored); Boon (penalty shoot-out scored); Luypaert (penalty shoot-out missed); Boon (penalty shoot-out scored)	3–1	(penalty shoot-out missed) Mazzilli; (penalty shoot-out missed) Rossi; (penalty shoot-out scored) Paredes; (penalty shoot-out missed) Agulleiro

Umpires:
Andrew Kennedy (ENG)
Raghu Prasad (IND)

17 January 2014
15:30

Germany	4–5	India
Korn 4'; Stralkowski 6'; Weß 27'; Häner 55'	Report	Mandeep 18', 41', 53'; Rupinder Pal 39', 70'

Umpires:
Gregory Uyttenhove (BEL)
Satoshi Kondo (JPN)

===== Seventh and eighth place =====
18 January 2014
13:15

Argentina	1–2	Germany
Callioni 16'	Report	Weß 22'; Matania 60'

Umpires:
Gregory Uyttenhove (BEL)
Raghu Prasad (IND)

===== Fifth and sixth place =====
18 January 2014
15:30

Belgium	2–1	India
Van Aubel 67'; Boon 68'	Report	Thimmaiah 59'

Umpires:
Satoshi Kondo (JPN)
Murray Grime (AUS)

==== First to fourth place classification ====
===== Semifinals =====
17 January 2014
17:45

England	3–3	New Zealand
Martin 23'; Gleghorne 49'; Jackson 64'	Report	M. Child 12'; Jenness 61'; Inglis 62'
Penalties
Catlin (penalty shoot-out missed); Martin (penalty shoot-out missed); Jackson (penalty shoot-out scored); Carson (penalty shoot-out scored); Middleton (penalty shoot-out scored); Jackson (penalty shoot-out scored); Middleton (penalty shoot-out missed); Carson (penalty shoot-out scored); Catlin (penalty shoot-out scored); Martin (penalty shoot-out missed)	6–7	(penalty shoot-out missed) Inglis; (penalty shoot-out scored) Hilton; (penalty shoot-out scored) S. Child; (penalty shoot-out missed) Edwards; (penalty shoot-out scored) Burrows; (penalty shoot-out scored) Inglis; (penalty shoot-out missed) Hilton; (penalty shoot-out scored) S. Child; (penalty shoot-out scored) Edwards; (penalty shoot-out scored) Burrows

Umpires:
Murray Grime (AUS)
German Montes de Oca (ARG)

17 January 2014
20:00

Netherlands	4–3	Australia
Jonker 12'; Van der Weerden 20', 66'; Hertzberger 62'	Report	Govers 42', 55'; Ford 47'

Umpires:
Marcin Grochal (POL)
Kim Hong-Lae (KOR)

===== Third and fourth place =====
18 January 2014
17:45

England	2–1	Australia
Carson 13'; Middleton 54'	Report	Turner 16'

Umpires:
Roel van Eert (NED)
Kim Hong-Lae (KOR)

===== Final =====
18 January 2014
20:00

New Zealand	2–7	Netherlands
Edwards 37', 52'	Report	Jonker 17', 35', 61'; Bakker 23', 59'; De Voogd 36'; Hofman 45'

Umpires:
Gary Simmonds (RSA)
German Montes de Oca (ARG)

== Awards ==
Player of the Tournament	Top Goalscorer	Goalkeeper of the Tournament	Young Player of the Tournament
(Netherlands) Robbert Kemperman	(Australia) Kieran Govers	(England) George Pinner	(India) Mandeep Singh

== Statistics ==
=== Final standings ===
1. Netherlands
2. New Zealand
3. England
4. Australia
5. Belgium
6. India
7. Germany
8. Argentina

=== Goalscorers ===
There were 114 goals scored in 24 matches, for an average of 4.75 goals per match.

6 goals

- (Australia) Kieran Govers

5 goals

- (Belgium) Tom Boon
- (Netherlands) Constantijn Jonker

4 goals

- (Argentina) Facundo Callioni
- (Australia) Russell Ford
- (England) Tom Carson
- (England) Ashley Jackson
- (Germany) Thilo Stralkowski
- (India) Mandeep Singh
- (Netherlands) Mink van der Weerden

3 goals

- (Germany) Oliver Korn
- (India) Rupinder Pal Singh
- (Netherlands) Billy Bakker
- (New Zealand) Stephen Jenness

2 goals

- (Argentina) Pedro Ibarra
- (Argentina) Matías Paredes
- (Australia) Glenn Turner
- (Australia) Jacob Whetton
- (Australia) Jason Wilson
- (England) Adam Dixon
- (England) Mark Gleghorne
- (England) Barry Middleton
- (Germany) Benjamin Weß
- (Netherlands) Seve van Ass
- (Netherlands) Jeroen Hertzberger
- (New Zealand) Steve Edwards
- (New Zealand) Hugo Inglis
- (New Zealand) Kane Russell

1 goal

- (Argentina) Guido Barreiros
- (Argentina) Juan Ignacio Gilardi
- (Argentina) Gonzalo Peillat
- (Argentina) Matías Rey
- (Australia) Daniel Beale
- (Australia) Nicholas Budgeon
- (Australia) Mark Knowles
- (Australia) Simon Orchard
- (Belgium) Florent van Aubel
- (Belgium) Thomas Briels
- (Belgium) Félix Denayer
- (England) Harry Martin
- (Germany) Florian Fuchs
- (Germany) Tobias Hauke
- (Germany) Martin Häner
- (Germany) Tobias Matania
- (Germany) Marco Miltkau
- (Germany) Jan-Philipp Rabente
- (Germany) Christopher Wesley
- (India) Birendra Lakra
- (India) Dharamvir Singh
- (India) Chandanda Thimmaiah
- (India) Yuvraj Walmiki
- (Netherlands) Rogier Hofman
- (Netherlands) Bob de Voogd
- (New Zealand) Marcus Child
- (New Zealand) Shea McAleese

1 own goal

- Argentina (against Belgium)
- Germany (against India)
- India (against Germany)

Source: FIH
