= 2009 Men's Hockey Junior World Cup =

9th edition of the Men's Hockey Junior World Cup

Tournament details
- Host countries: Malaysia; Singapore
- Teams: 20
- Venue: 2 (in 2 host cities)

Final positions
- Champions: Germany (5th title)
- Runner-up: Netherlands
- Third place: Australia

Tournament statistics
- Matches played: 82
- Goals scored: 415 (5.06 per match)
- Top scorer: (Netherlands) Mink van der Weerden (13 goals)
- Best player: (New Zealand) Simon Child

The 2009 Hockey Junior World Cup was the ninth tournament of the Hockey Junior World Cup. The tournament was co-hosted in both Johor Bahru, Malaysia and Singapore from June 7 to June 21, 2009. It was contested by 20 teams with Germany defeating Netherlands in the final to claim their fifth Junior World Cup title.

== Teams ==
The teams were announced by the International Hockey Federation on November 12, 2008. The teams listed are sorted by the ranking obtained in each qualification tournament. The FIH released the pools on January 26, 2009, and the schedule on February 2, 2009.

Dates	Event	Location	Quotas	Qualifier(s)
—N/a	Hosts	—N/a	2	Malaysia; Singapore
11–18 July 2008	2008 Junior Asia Cup	Hyderabad, India	4	India; South Korea; Pakistan; Japan
11–19 July 2008	2008 Junior Africa Cup	Cairo, Egypt	2	South Africa; Egypt
20–26 July 2008	2008 EuroHockey Junior Championship	San Sebastián, Spain	6	Spain; Netherlands; Germany; Belgium; England; Poland
	2008 EuroHockey Junior Nations Trophy	Bra, Italy	1	Russia
17–26 October 2008	2008 Pan American Junior Championship	Port of Spain, Trinidad and Tobago	3	Argentina; Chile; United States
11–14 December 2008	2008 Junior Oceania Cup	Brisbane, Australia	2	Australia; New Zealand
Total			20	

== Results ==
All times are Malaysia Time and Singapore Time (UTC+08:00)

=== Preliminary round ===
==== Pool A ====
Pos	Team	Pld	W	D	L	GF	GA	GD	Pts	Qualification
1	Argentina	4	3	0	1	17	7	+10	9	Advance to medal round
2	Pakistan	4	3	0	1	14	6	+8	9	Advance to medal round
3	Belgium	4	3	0	1	13	6	+7	9	
4	Egypt	4	1	0	3	5	11	−6	3	
5	Russia	4	0	0	4	6	25	−19	0	

Source: FIH
Rules for classification: 1) points; 2) goal difference; 3) goals scored; 4) head-to-head result.

7 June 2009
17:00

Belgium	5–1	Egypt
Peeters 24', 67', 69'; Pangrazio 36'; Paeuw 70'		Ghabran 41'

Johor Bahru, Malaysia
Umpires:
Raghu Prasad (IND)
Hichem Azaiez (FRA)

7 June 2009
17:30

Pakistan	7–2	Russia
Khan 6', 49', 66'; Rasool 21'; Zubair 53'; Ali 56', 70'		Mayorov 28'; Yankun 52'

Johor Bahru, Malaysia
Umpires:
Kanaisan Kanapathy (MAS)
Daniel López (URU)

8 June 2009
17:30

Egypt	0–3	Pakistan
		Khan 46', 54'; Ali 50'

Johor Bahru, Malaysia
Umpires:
Chris Wilson (CAN)
Jang Jung-Min (KOR)

8 June 2009
19:00

Russia	3–9	Argentina
Mayorov 33'; Yankun 61', 70'		Salis 9'; Barreiros López 14', 30', 31', 66'; Tolini 23'; Mazzilli 26', 49'; Agulleiro 63'

Johor Bahru, Malaysia
Umpires:
Satoshi Kondo (JPN)
Ayden Shrives (RSA)

9 June 2009
17:30

Argentina	3–0	Belgium
Mazzilli 40'; Andino 53', 69'

Johor Bahru, Malaysia
Umpires:
Nigel Iggo (NZL)
Adam Kearns (AUS)

10 June 2009
17:30

Russia	0–3	Egypt
		Basha 32'; Shestawy 58'; Hamde 62'

Johor Bahru, Malaysia
Umpires:
Lim Hong Zhen (SIN)
Haider Rasool (PAK)

11 June 2009
17:00

Belgium	6–1	Russia
Thys 13'; Denayer 46'; Peeters 52'; Herbert 63', 65'; Pangrazio 68'		Mayorov 34'

Johor Bahru, Malaysia
Umpires:
German Montes de Oca (ARG)
Marcin Grochal (POL)

11 June 2009
19:30

Pakistan	3–2	Argentina
Haider 35'; Irfan 64'; Zubair 66'		Tolini 7'; Montelli 56'

Johor Bahru, Malaysia
Umpires:
Warren McCully (IRL)
Raghu Prasad (IND)

12 June 2009
17:30

Egypt	1–3	Argentina
Ghabran 27'		Montelli 21', 39'; Tolini 49'

Johor Bahru, Malaysia
Umpires:
Jang Jun-Min (KOR)
Richmond Attipoe (GHA)

12 June 2009
19:00

Belgium	2–1	Pakistan
Denayer 41'; Boon 65'		Khan 35'

Johor Bahru, Malaysia
Umpires:
Satoshi Kondo (JPN)
Roderick Wijsmuller (NED)

==== Pool B ====
Pos	Team	Pld	W	D	L	GF	GA	GD	Pts	Qualification
1	Australia	4	3	1	0	13	2	+11	10	Advance to medal round
2	Germany	4	3	1	0	13	2	+11	10	Advance to medal round
3	South Africa	4	1	1	2	7	8	−1	4	
4	Japan	4	1	1	2	6	11	−5	4	
5	Chile	4	0	0	4	2	18	−16	0	

Source: FIH
Rules for classification: 1) points; 2) goal difference; 3) goals scored; 4) head-to-head result.

7 June 2009
17:00

Japan	1–1	South Africa
K. Tanaka 35'		Vervoort 17'

Singapore
Umpires:
Daniel Barstow (ENG)
Chris Wilson (CAN)

7 June 2009
19:30

Germany	5–0	Chile
Matania 1'; Schacht 16'; Fuhrmann 34'; Fleckhaus 39'; Grell 67'

Singapore
Umpires:
Lim Hong Zhen (SIN)
Vincent Loos (BEL)

8 June 2009
19:00

South Africa	0–4	Germany
		Fuhrmann 7'; Fuchs 17'; Miltkau 33'; Matania 36'

Singapore
Umpires:
Hichem Zaziez (FRA)
Marcelo Servetto (ESP)

8 June 2009
17:30

Chile	0–4	Australia
		T. Bates 2'; Whetton 30'; Govers 43'; Kleinschmidt 58'

Singapore
Umpires:
Richard Attipoe (GHA)
Marcin Grochal (POL)

9 June 2009
19:30

Australia	6–1	Japan
T. Bates 22'; T. White 25'; Bausor 32'; Whetton 37'; Pollard 56'; M. Bates 67'		Asakura 7'

Singapore
Umpires:
Jang Jung-Min (KOR)
Saleem Aaron (USA)

10 June 2009
17:30

Chile	1–6	South Africa
Richter 54'		Vervoort 7', 20'; Paton 13'; Panther 35' van Helsdingen 42'; Khanyile 57'

Singapore
Umpires:
Roderick Wijsmuller (NED)
Kanapathy Kanaisan (MAS)

11 June 2009
17:00

Japan	3–1	Chile
Asakura 22'; Yoshikawa 31'; Tanaka 67'		Binder 26'

Singapore
Umpires:
Richmond Attipoe (GHA)
Kanaisan Kanapathy (MAS)

11 June 2009
19:00

Germany	1–1	Australia
Miltkau 65'		Gohdes 21'

Singapore
Umpires:
Roderick Wijsmuller (NED)
Marcelo Servetto (ESP)

12 June 2009
17:00

Australia	2–0	South Africa
M. Bates 11'; Kleinschmidt 18'

Singapore
Umpires:
Ahmed Youssef (EGY)
Nigel Iggo (NZL)

12 June 2009
17:30

Germany	3–1	Japan
Schacht 5', 57'; Klein 10'		Kubo 22'

Singapore
Umpires:
Haider Rasool (PAK)
German Montes de Oca (ARG)

12 June 2009
21:00

Australia	v	Germany
Penalties
Govers (penalty shoot-out scored); T. Bates (penalty shoot-out scored); Gohdes (penalty shoot-out scored); Kleinschmidt (penalty shoot-out missed); T. White (penalty shoot-out scored)	4–3	(penalty shoot-out scored) Häner; (penalty shoot-out scored) Schacht; (penalty shoot-out missed) Mantania; (penalty shoot-out scored) Klein; (penalty shoot-out missed) Hablawetz

Singapore

==== Pool C ====
Pos	Team	Pld	W	D	L	GF	GA	GD	Pts	Qualification
1	South Korea	4	3	1	0	12	2	+10	10	Advance to medal round
2	Spain	4	2	1	1	14	5	+9	7	Advance to medal round
3	Malaysia	4	2	1	1	9	7	+2	7	
4	England	4	1	1	2	7	5	+2	4	
5	United States	4	0	0	4	2	25	−23	0	

Source: FIH
Rules for classification: 1) points; 2) goal difference; 3) goals scored; 4) head-to-head result.

7 June 2009
19:00

South Korea	7–0	United States
Lee W. 9', 25', 29'; Kang Moon-Ky. 18'; Kang Moon-Kw. 44'; Lee D. 47'; Kim J. 58'

Johor Bahru, Malaysia
Umpires:
Ahmed Youssef (EGY)
Marcin Grochal (POL)

7 June 2009
19:30

England	0–1	Malaysia
		Faizal 29'

Johor Bahru, Malaysia
Umpires:
Roderick Wijsmuller (NED)
Adam Kearns (AUS)

8 June 2009
17:00

United States	0–9	Spain
		García 21'; Piera 23', 52'; Arana 28'; Oliva 43'; Dabanch 47', 69', 70'; Lleonart 61'

Johor Bahru, Malaysia
Umpires:
Nigel Iggo (NZL)
Lim Hong Zhen (SIN)

8 June 2009
19:30

Malaysia	0–2	South Korea
		Kang Moon-Ky. 5'; Jeong 55'

Johor Bahru, Malaysia
Umpires:
Warren McCully (IRL)
German Montes de Oca (ARG)

9 June 2009
19:30

Spain	2–1	England
Piera 13'; Lleonart 35'		Edmonstone 69'

Johor Bahru, Malaysia
Umpires:
Daniel López Ramos (URU)
Raghu Prasad (IND)

10 June 2009
19:30

Malaysia	5–2	United States
Izzat 2'; Marhan 8'; Faizal 10', 65'; Shafiq 11'		Szoke 29'; Cunningham 58'

Johor Bahru, Malaysia
Umpires:
Satoshi Kondo (JPN)
Richmond Attipoe (GHA)

11 June 2009
17:30

England	4–0	United States
Weir 24'; Kinder 36', 38'; Gregg 51'

Johor Bahru, Malaysia
Umpires:
Vincent Loos (BEL)
Chen Dekang (CHN)

11 June 2009
19:00

South Korea	1–0	Spain
Seo 49'

Johor Bahru, Malaysia
Umpires:
Ayden Shrives (RSA)
Hichem Azaiez (FRA)

12 June 2009
17:00

South Korea	2–2	England
Kang Moon-Kw. 52'; Lee D. 63'		Gregg 6'; Beckett 56'

Johor Bahru, Malaysia
Umpires:
Warren McCully (IRL)
Chris Wilson (CAN)

12 June 2009
19:30

Spain	3–3	Malaysia
Oliva 20'; García 22'; Lleonart 50'		Faizal 10', 62'; Izwan 55'

Johor Bahru, Malaysia
Umpires:
Vincent Loos (BEL)
Raghu Prasad (IND)

==== Pool D ====
Pos	Team	Pld	W	D	L	GF	GA	GD	Pts	Qualification
1	Netherlands	4	3	1	0	20	6	+14	10	Advance to medal round
2	New Zealand	4	2	2	0	15	6	+9	8	Advance to medal round
3	India	4	2	1	1	18	7	+11	7	
4	Poland	4	1	0	3	7	20	−13	3	
5	Singapore	4	0	0	4	2	23	−21	0	

Source: FIH
Rules for classification: 1) points; 2) goal difference; 3) goals scored; 4) head-to-head result.

7 June 2009
17:30

Netherlands	8–0	Singapore
Kempermann 10'; Van der Weerden 17', 20'; De Voogd 26', 49', 55'; Siebinga 47'; Musters 69'

Singapore
Umpires:
Ayden Shrives (USA)
Warren McCully (IRL)

7 June 2009
19:00

New Zealand	8–1	Poland
S. Child 9', 16', 26', 66'; Bartholomew 46'; Neal 52'; Inglis 53'; Panchia 69'		Raciniewski 33'

Singapore
Umpires:
Salemm Aaron (USA)
German Montes de Oca (GER)

8 June 2009
17:00

Poland	2–7	Netherlands
Siejkowski 14'; Nowakowski 48'		Van der Weerden 16', 24'; Pruijser 28'; Brasem 35'; De Voogd 36'; Bakker 49'; Kempermann 60'

Singapore
Umpires:
Chen Dekang (CHN)
Vincent Loos (BEL)

8 June 2009
19:30

Singapore	0–10	India
		Mujtaba 5', 51', 55'; Diwakar 15', 18', 29', 66'; D. Singh 26'; Antil 29'; Vivek 47'

Singapore
Umpires:
Haider Rasool (PAK)
Daniel Barstow (ENG)

9 June 2009
17:30

India	2–2	New Zealand
Diwakar 13'; Kumar 36'		S. Child 10'; M. Child 32'

Singapore
Umpires:
Chen Dekang (CHN)
Marcelo Servetto (ESP)

10 June 2009
19:30

Singapore	1–2	Poland
Tan Yi Ru 62'		Kozlowski 52'; Makowski 70'

Singapore
Umpires:
Ahmed Essmat Youssef (EGY)
Chris Wilson (CAN)

11 June 2009
17:30

Netherlands	3–2	India
Van der Weerden 10', 13', 51'		Antil 5'; I. Kullu 53'

Singapore
Umpires:
Adam Kearns (AUS)
Daniel Barstow (ENG)

11 June 2009
19:30

New Zealand	3–1	Singapore
S. Child 9', 43'; Clark 49'		Anbalagan 56'

Singapore
Umpires:
Daniel López Ramos (URU)
Saleem Aaron (USA)

12 June 2009
19:00

Netherlands	2–2	New Zealand
Verga 27'; Van der Weerden 44'		Inglis 52'; S. Child 61'

Singapore
Umpires:
Marcin Grochal (POL)
Ayden Shrives (RSA)

12 June 2009
19:30

India	4–2	Poland
Khan 25'; Kumar 29'; Diwakar 50'; Kshetrimayum 70'		Makowski 41'; Kozlowski 44'

Singapore
Umpires:
Lim Hong Zhen (SIN)
Hichem Azaiez (FRA)

=== Medal round ===
==== Pool E ====
Pos	Team	Pld	W	D	L	GF	GA	GD	Pts	Qualification
1	Netherlands	3	2	1	0	7	2	+5	7	Advance to Semi-finals
2	Germany	3	2	1	0	9	5	+4	7	Advance to Semi-finals
3	Argentina	3	1	0	2	6	7	−1	3	
4	Spain	3	0	0	3	4	12	−8	0	

Source: FIH
Rules for classification: 1) points; 2) goal difference; 3) goals scored; 4) head-to-head result.

14 June 2009
17:30

Netherlands	3–0	Spain
Vermeulen 12'; Van der Weerden 33'; Verga 58'

Singapore
Umpires:
Nigel Iggo (NZL)
Jang Jung-Min (KOR)

14 June 2009
19:30

Germany	3–1	Argentina
Häner 34'; Oldhafer 63'; Schmidt 69'		Mazzilli 28'

Singapore
Umpires:
Marcin Grochal (POL)
Adam Kearns (AUS)

15 June 2009
17:30

Argentina	1–3	Netherlands
Barreiros López 30'		Buissant 21'; Van der Weerden 47'; Vermeulen 49'

Johor Bahru, Malaysia
Umpires:
Warren McCully (IRL)
Ayden Shrives (RSA)

15 June 2009
19:30

Spain	3–5	Germany
Dabanch ?', 45'; Arana 27'		Häner 2', 11'; Oldhafer 18'; Matania 42'; Miltkau 65'

Johor Bahru, Malaysia
Umpires:
Daniel Barstow (ENG)
Adam Kearns (AUS)

17 June 2009
17:30

Spain	1–4	Argentina
Dabanch 3'		Agulleiro 40'; Salis 42'; Gebhardt 49'; Tolini 56'

Johor Bahru, Malaysia
Umpires:
Richmond Attipoe (GHA)
Vincent Loos (BEL)

17 June 2009
17:30

Netherlands	1–1	Germany
Buissant 38'		Fleckhaus 12'

Singapore
Umpires:
Raghu Prasad (IND)
Nigel Iggo (NZL)

==== Pool F ====
Pos	Team	Pld	W	D	L	GF	GA	GD	Pts	Qualification
1	Australia	3	3	0	0	11	2	+9	9	Advance to Semi-finals
2	New Zealand	3	1	1	1	7	7	0	4	Advance to Semi-finals
3	Pakistan	3	1	0	2	8	11	−3	3	
4	South Korea	3	0	1	2	5	11	−6	1	

Source: FIH
Rules for classification: 1) points; 2) goal difference; 3) goals scored; 4) head-to-head result.

14 June 2009
17:30

South Korea	3–3	New Zealand
Jeong 28', 63'; Kang Moon-Kw. 56'		S. Child 19'; Jenness 25'; Bartholomew 66'

Johor Bahru, Malaysia
Umpires:
German Montes De Oca (ARG)
Daniel López Ramos (URU)

14 June 2009
19:30

Pakistan	1–6	Australia
Khan 1'		M. Bates 13'; Govers 17', 41'; J. White 21'; Gohdes 60'; Whetton 67'

Johor Bahru, Malaysia
Umpires:
Daniel Barstow (ENG)
Ayden Shrives (RSA)

15 June 2009
17:30

New Zealand	4–2	Pakistan
Wilson 8'; Jenness 12'; Inglis 47'; S. Child 62'		Rizwan 12'; Waqas 15'

Singapore
Umpires:
Richmond Attipoe (GHA)
Marcelo Servetto (ESP)

15 June 2009
19:30

Australia	3–1	South Korea
Gohdes 6', 14'; T. Bates 54'		Jeon 70'

Singapore
Umpires:
Raghu Prasad (IND)
Roderick Wijsmuller (NED)^{+}
^{+} Replaced at half time by Marcin Grochal (POL) due to injury

17 June 2009
19:30

South Korea	1–5	Pakistan
Kang Moon-Ky. 70'		Haider 3'; Zubair 13', 42'; Khan 28', 68'

Johor Bahru, Malaysia
Umpires:
Adam Kearns (AUS)
Hichem Azaiez (FRA)

17 June 2009
19:30

Australia	2–0	New Zealand
Pollard 26'; Kleinschmidt 34'

Singapore
Umpires:
Chris Wilson (CAN)
German Montes De Oca (ARG)

=== Non-medal round ===
==== Pool G ====
Pos	Team	Pld	W	D	L	GF	GA	GD	Pts
1	India	3	3	0	0	20	2	+18	9
2	Belgium	3	2	0	1	8	6	+2	6
3	Japan	3	1	0	2	6	14	−8	3
4	England	3	0	0	3	1	13	−12	0

Source: FIH
Rules for classification: 1) points; 2) goal difference; 3) goals scored; 4) head-to-head result.

14 June 2009
08:30

Belgium	2–0	England
Boon 13'; Keusters 22'

Johor Bahru, Malaysia
Umpires:
Marcelo Servetto (ESP)
Hichem Azaiez (FRA)

14 June 2009
19:00

India	7–2	Japan
Diwakar 11'; Antil 18', 24'; Khan 52', 70'; Kshetrimayum 58', 62'		Fujiyoshi 41'; K. Tanaka 65'

Singapore
Umpires:
Warren McCully (IRL)
Ahmed Youseef (EGY)

15 June 2009
17:00

England	1–2	Japan
Griffiths 42'		R. Kubo 1', 58'

Johor Bahru, Malaysia
Umpires:
Lim Hong Zhen (SIN)
Saleem Aaron (USA)

15 June 2009
17:00

India	4–0	Belgium
Diwakar 25'; Mujtaba 27'; Kshetrimayum 40'; Jay 59'

Singapore
Umpires:
Daniel López Ramos (URU)
Jang Jung-Min (KOR)

17 June 2009
08:30

Belgium	6–2	Japan
Peeters 21', 58'; Denayer 30', 70'; Boon 65', 69'		R. Kubo 8'; Fujiyoshi 31'

Johor Bahru, Malaysia
Umpires:
Kanaisan Kanapathy (MAS)
Ahmed Youssef (EGY)

17 June 2009
08:30

India	9–0	England
Mujtaba 1', 20'; Jay 7'; Diwakar 23', 48', 67'; Kshetrimayum 32'; Antil 52'; I. Kullu 63'

Singapore
Umpires:
Lim Hong Zhen (SIN)
Ayden Shrives (RSA)

==== Pool H ====
Pos	Team	Pld	W	D	L	GF	GA	GD	Pts
1	Poland	3	2	1	0	8	6	+2	7
2	Malaysia	3	1	1	1	6	5	+1	4
3	Egypt	3	0	3	0	5	5	0	3
4	South Africa	3	0	1	2	7	10	−3	1

Source: FIH
Rules for classification: 1) points; 2) goal difference; 3) goals scored; 4) head-to-head result.

14 June 2009
17:00

Egypt	2–2	South Africa
Abdelhakeem 52'; Edris 70'		Vervoort 21'; Panther 47'

Johor Bahru, Malaysia
Umpires:
Raghu Prasad (IND)
Lim Hong Zhen (SIN)

14 June 2009
19:00

Malaysia	1–2	Poland
Faizal 33'		Baniewicz 28'; Oszykczyk 65'

Johor Bahru, Malaysia
Umpires:
Chen Dekang (CHN)
Saleem Arron (USA)

15 June 2009
19:00

Malaysia	3–1	South Africa
Faizal 19'; Hafiq 63'; Izwan 67'		Vervoort 16'

Johor Bahru, Malaysia
Umpires:
German Montes De Oca (GER)
Hichem Azaiez (FRA)

15 June 2009
19:00

Poland	1–1	Egypt
Kozłowski 46'		Ghabran 33'

Singapore
Umpires:
Chris Wilson (CAN)
Nigel Iggo (NZL)

17 June 2009
08:30

South Africa	4–5	Poland
Vervoort 15', 27'; Phillips 42', 55'		Makowski 2'; Kozłowski 31', 33'; Nowakowski 52'; Oszyjczyk 58'

Singapore
Umpires:
Chen Dekang (CHN)
Saleem Arron (USA)

17 June 2009
21:00

Malaysia	2–2	Egypt
Fiazal 25'; Hafiq 47'		Abdelhakim 28'; Atef 69'

Johor Bahru, Malaysia
Umpires:
Haider Rasool (PAK)
Daniel López Ramos (URU)

==== Pool I ====
Pos	Team	Pld	W	D	L	GF	GA	GD	Pts
1	Russia	3	2	0	1	11	9	+2	6
2	Chile	3	2	0	1	9	8	+1	6
3	United States	3	2	0	1	8	7	+1	6
4	Singapore	3	0	0	3	8	12	−4	0

Source: FIH
Rules for classification: 1) points; 2) goal difference; 3) goals scored; 4) head-to-head result.

14 June 2009
08:00

United States	4–3	Russia
Pelle 18'; Padhiar 24', 52'; Ginolfi 26'		Mayorov 10'; Komarov 43'; Yankun 63'

Johor Bahru, Malaysia
Umpires:
Vincent Loos (BEL)
Kanaisan Kanapathy (MAS)

14 June 2009
17:00

Chile	5–3	Singapore
Krussg 20'; Fuenzalida 33'; Thiermann 35'; Rodríguez 65', 68'		Marican 7'; Sivalingam 38'; Yuhari 53'

Singapore
Umpires:
Satoshi Kondo (JPN)
Haider Rasool (PAK)

16 June 2009
17:30

Russia	4–2	Chile
Mayorov 12', 70'; Komarov 13'; Golubev 38'		Rodríguez 5'; Achondo 45'

Singapore
Umpires:
Marcin Grochal (POL)
Chen Dekang (CHN)

16 June 2009
19:30

Singapore	2–3	United States
Tan 25'; Yuhari 67'		Szoke 30'; Holt 47', 70'

Singapore
Umpires:
Ahmed Youssef (EGY)
Daniel López Ramos (URU)

17 June 2009
17:00

United States	1–2	Chile
Ginolfi 63'		Richter 11'; Rodríguez 30'

Johor Bahru, Malaysia
Umpires:
Daniel Barstow (ENG)
Jang Jung-Min (KOR)

17 June 2009
19:00

Singapore	3–4	Russia
Ibrahim 15'; Anbalagan 26'; Marican 41'		Bolshakov 16'; Mayorov 35', 45'; Golubev 50'

Singapore
Umpires:
Satoshi Kondo (JPN)
Marcelo Servetto (ESP)

=== Fifth to twentieth place classification ===
==== Nineteenth and twentieth place ====
20 June 2009
17:30

United States	1–3	Singapore
Ginolfi 60'		Sivalingam 29', 58'; Marican 40'

Singapore
Umpires:
Kanaisan Kanapathy (MAS)
Hichem Azaiez (FRA)

==== Seventeenth and eighteenth place ====
20 June 2009
20:00

Russia	3–5	Chile
Bolshakov 27'; Larikov 44'; Pozdnyakov 59'		Theirmann 33'; Siebert 48', 50'; Rodríguez 59', 68'

Johor Bahru, Malaysia
Umpires:
Ahmed Youseef (EGY)
Saleem Aaron (USA)

==== Fifteenth and sixteenth place ====
19 June 2009
17:00

South Africa	2–2 (a.e.t.)	England
Edmonstone 31', 51'		Grobler 53'; Phillips 66'
Penalties
Vervoort (penalty shoot-out scored); Pretorius (penalty shoot-out scored); Van Helsdingen (penalty shoot-out scored); Phillips (penalty shoot-out scored); Paton (penalty shoot-out scored) --- Vervoort (penalty shoot-out scored)	6–5	(penalty shoot-out scored) Catlin; (penalty shoot-out scored) Kinder; (penalty shoot-out scored) Beckett; (penalty shoot-out scored) Griffiths; (penalty shoot-out scored) Edwards --- (penalty shoot-out missed) Catlin

Singapore
Umpires:
Haider Rasool (PAK)
Satoshi Kondo (JPN)

==== Thirteenth and fourteenth place ====
20 June 2009
17:00

Japan	2–1	Egypt
R. Kubo 9'; Kitazato 66'		Atef 5'

Singapore
Umpires:
Vincent Loos (BEL)
Chen Dekang (CHN)

==== Eleventh and twelfth place ====
20 June 2009
17:30

Belgium	3–2	Malaysia
Denayer 26'; Gougnard 35'; Keusters 39'		Izwan 43'; Nadesh 70'

Johor Bahru, Malaysia
Umpires:
Raghu Prasad (IND)
Marcelo Servetto (ESP)

==== Ninth and tenth place ====
20 June 2009
20:00

India	4–0	Poland
Khan 18'; Jay 35'; Mujtaba 45'; Lakra 58'

Singapore
Umpires:
Daniel López Ramos (URU)
Chris Wilson (CAN)

==== Seventh and eighth place ====
19 June 2009
17:30

Spain	3–4	South Korea
Casasayas 6'; García 9'; Arana 28'		Kang 29', 67'; Lee D. 49'; Jeon 69'

Johor Bahru, Malaysia
Umpires:
Richmond Attipoe (GHA)
Nigel Iggo (NZL)

==== Fifth and sixth place ====
19 June 2009
17:30

Argentina	1–4	Pakistan
Barreiros López 16'		Shahzad 9'; Rasool 45', 63'; Haider 65'

Singapore
Umpires:
Jang Jung-Min (KOR)
Marcin Grochal (POL)

=== First to fourth place classification ===
Semi-finals
19 June 2009
Australia	2
Germany (a.e.t)	3
19 June 2009
Netherlands	4
New Zealand	1

Final
21 June 2009
Germany	3
Netherlands	1
Third place
21 June 2009
Australia	4
New Zealand	1

==== Semi-finals ====
19 June 2009
20:00

Australia	2–3 (a.e.t.)	Germany
Kleinschmidt 34'; Gohdes 44'		Fuchs 18', 75'; Schmidt 27'

Johor Bahru, Malaysia
Umpires:
Ayden Shrives (RSA)
German Montes de Oca (ARG)

19 June 2009
20:00

Netherlands	4–1	New Zealand
Buissant 39'; Van der Weerden 60', 62'; Kempermann 65'		S. Child 24'

Singapore
Umpires:
Adam Kearns (AUS)
Daniel Barstow (ENG)

==== Third and fourth place ====
21 June 2009
17:00

Australia	4–1	New Zealand
T. Bates 14', 27'; M. Bates 24'; Lockley 69'		Bartholomew 47'

Johor Bahru, Malaysia
Umpires:
Jang Jung-Min (KOR)
Warren McCully (IRL)

==== Final ====
21 June 2009
19:30

Germany	3–1	Netherlands
Miltkau 24'; Fuchs 56'; Fleckhaus 61'		Van der Weerden 22'

Johor Bahru, Malaysia
Umpires:
Raghu Prasad (IND)
Marcelo Servetto (ESP)

== Awards ==
Player of the Tournament	Goalkeeper of the Tournament	Topscorer	Fair Play
(New Zealand) Simon Child	(Germany) Niklas Sakowsky	(Netherlands) Mink van der Weerden	Germany

== Statistics ==
=== Final standings ===
As per statistical convention in field hockey, matches decided in extra time are counted as wins and losses, while matches decided by penalty shoot-outs are counted as draws.

Pos	Grp	Team	Pld	W	D	L	GF	GA	GD	Pts	Final result
1st place, gold medalist(s)	B	Germany	9	7	2	0	28	10	+18	23	Gold medal
2nd place, silver medalist(s)	D	Netherlands	9	6	2	1	32	12	+20	20	Silver medal
3rd place, bronze medalist(s)	B	Australia	9	7	1	1	30	7	+23	22	Bronze medal
4	D	New Zealand	9	3	3	3	24	21	+3	12	Fourth place
5	A	Pakistan	8	5	0	3	26	18	+8	15	Eliminated in medal round
6	A	Argentina	8	4	0	4	24	18	+6	12	Eliminated in medal round
7	C	South Korea	8	4	2	2	21	16	+5	14	Eliminated in medal round
8	C	Spain	8	2	1	5	21	21	0	7	Eliminated in medal round
9	D	India	8	6	1	1	42	9	+33	19	Eliminated in group stage
10	D	Poland	8	3	1	4	15	30	−15	10	Eliminated in group stage
11	A	Belgium	8	6	0	2	24	14	+10	18	Eliminated in group stage
12	C	Malaysia	8	3	2	3	17	15	+2	11	Eliminated in group stage
13	B	Japan	8	3	1	4	14	26	−12	10	Eliminated in group stage
14	A	Egypt	8	1	3	4	11	18	−7	6	Eliminated in group stage
15	B	South Africa	8	1	3	4	16	20	−4	6	Eliminated in group stage
16	C	England	8	1	2	5	10	20	−10	5	Eliminated in group stage
17	B	Chile	8	3	0	5	16	29	−13	9	Eliminated in group stage
18	A	Russia	8	2	0	6	20	39	−19	6	Eliminated in group stage
19	D	Singapore	8	1	0	7	13	36	−23	3	Eliminated in group stage
20	C	United States	8	2	0	6	11	35	−24	6	Eliminated in group stage

Source: FIH

=== Goalscorers ===
There were 415 goals scored in 82 matches, for an average of 5.06 goals per match.

13 goals

- (Netherlands) Mink van der Weerden

11 goals

- (India) Diwakar Ram
- (New Zealand) Simon Child

9 goals

- (Pakistan) Abdul Haseem Khan

8 goals

- (Malaysia) Faizal Saari
- (Russia) Alexey Mayorov

7 goals

- (India) Danish Mujtaba
- (South Africa) Antony Vervoort

6 goals

- (Argentina) Guido Barreiros López
- (Belgium) Maximilien Peeters
- (Chile) Martín Rodríguez
- (Spain) Gabriel Dabanch

5 goals

- (Australia) Timothy Bates
- (Australia) Matthew Gohdes
- (Belgium) Félix Denayer
- (India) Mandeep Antil
- (India) Victo Singh Kshetrimayum
- (Japan) Ryota Kubo
- (Poland) Piotr Kozłowski
- (South Korea) Kang Moon-Kweon

4 goals

- (Argentina) Agustín Mazzilli
- (Argentina) Leandro Tolini
- (Australia) Michael Bates
- (Australia) Aaron Kleinschmidt
- (Belgium) Tom Boon
- (Germany) Florian Fuchs
- (Germany) Marco Miltkau
- (India) Mohammad Amir Khan
- (Netherlands) Bob de Voogd
- (Pakistan) Muhammad Zubair
- (Russia) Nikolay Yankun

3 goals

- (Argentina) Santiago Montelli
- (Australia) Kieran Govers
- (Australia) Jacob Whetton
- (Egypt) Houssam Ghabran
- (England) Alex Edmonstone
- (Germany) Jan Fleckhaus
- (Germany) Martin Häner
- (Germany) Tobias Matania
- (Germany) Georg Schacht
- (India) Karan Jay
- (Japan) Kenta Tanaka
- (Malaysia) Izwan Tajuddin
- (Netherlands) Jan-Willem Buissant
- (Netherlands) Robbert Kempermann
- (New Zealand) Joseph Bartholomew
- (New Zealand) Hugo Inglis
- (Pakistan) Kashif Ali
- (Pakistan) Abbas Haider
- (Pakistan) Shafqat Rasool
- (Poland) Krystian Makowski
- (Singapore) Enrico Marican
- (Singapore) Johnson Sivalingam
- (South Africa) Dalan Phillips
- (South Korea) Lee Dong-Hyun
- (South Korea) Kang Moon-Kyu
- (South Korea) Lee Woo-Geun
- (South Korea) Jeong Yun-Sang
- (Spain) Diego Arana
- (Spain) Javier García
- (Spain) Xavi Lleonart
- (Spain) Salvador Piera
- (United States) Jonathan Ginolfi

2 goals

- (Argentina) Juan Agulleiro
- (Argentina) Alan Andino
- (Argentina) Nahuel Salis
- (Australia) Joshua Pollard
- (Belgium) Nicolas Herbert
- (Belgium) Amaury Keusters
- (Belgium) Renaud Pangrazio
- (Chile) Sven Richter
- (Chile) Pablo Siebert
- (Chile) Pablo Thiermann
- (Egypt) Ahmed Abdelhakeem
- (Egypt) Hamada Atef
- (England) Chris Gregg
- (England) John Kinder
- (Germany) Moritz Fuhrmann
- (Germany) Felix Oldhafer
- (Germany) Patrick Schmidt
- (India) Innocent Kullu
- (India) Pramod Kumar
- (Japan) Ken Asakura
- (Japan) Harayuki Fujiyoshi
- (Malaysia) Hafiq Gaffar
- (Netherlands) Valentin Verga
- (Netherlands) Klaas Vermeulen
- (New Zealand) Stephen Jenness
- (Poland) Michał Nowakowski
- (Poland) Szymon Oszykczyk
- (Russia) Sergey Bolshakov
- (Russia) Pavel Golubev
- (Russia) Nikolay Komarov
- (Singapore) Prashan Anbalagan
- (Singapore) Tan Yi Ru
- (Singapore) Muhammad Sabri Yuhari
- (South Africa) Brandon Panther
- (South Korea) Jeon Byung-Jin
- (Spain) Roc Oliva
- (United States) William Holt
- (United States) Viren Padhiar
- (United States) Nicholas Szoke

1 goal

- (Argentina) Martín Gebhardt
- (Australia) Chris Bausor
- (Australia) Adrian Lockley
- (Australia) Joshua White
- (Australia) Tristan White
- (Belgium) Alexandre de Paeuw
- (Belgium) Simon Gougnard
- (Belgium) Jeffrey Thys
- (Chile) Ricardo Achondo
- (Chile) Fernando Binder
- (Chile) Andres Fuenzalida
- (Chile) Thomás Krussig
- (Egypt) Eslam Basha
- (Egypt) Mohamed Edris
- (Egypt) Mahmoud Hamde
- (Egypt) Ahmed Shestawy
- (England) David Beckett
- (England) Chris Griffiths
- (England) Henry Weir
- (Germany) Niklas Grell
- (Germany) Felix Klein
- (India) Birendra Lakra
- (India) Dharamvir Singh
- (India) Vivek
- (Japan) Kenji Kitazato
- (Japan) Ken Yoshikawa
- (Malaysia) Marhan Jalil
- (Malaysia) Izzat Rahim
- (Malaysia) Nadesh Ramanthan
- (Malaysia) Shafiq Zain
- (Netherlands) Billy Bakker
- (Netherlands) Wouter Brasem
- (Netherlands) Roderick Musters
- (Netherlands) Mirco Pruijser
- (Netherlands) Lukas Siebinga
- (New Zealand) Marcus Child
- (New Zealand) Ricky Clark
- (New Zealand) Shay Neal
- (New Zealand) Arun Panchia
- (New Zealand) Nick Wilson
- (Pakistan) Muhammad Irfan
- (Pakistan) Muhammad Rizwan
- (Pakistan) Aamir Shahzad
- (Pakistan) Muhammad Waqas
- (Poland) Piotr Baniewicz
- (Poland) Michał Raciniewski
- (Poland) Bartosz Siejkowski
- (Russia) Ilya Larikov
- (Russia) Alexey Pozdnyakov
- (Singapore) Muhammad Aidal Ibrahim
- (South Africa) Warren Grobler
- (South Africa) Nduduzo Khanyile
- (South Africa) Taine Paton
- (South Africa) Simon van Helsdingen
- (South Korea) Seo Jin-Su
- (South Korea) Kim Ju-Hun
- (Spain) Álex Casasayas
- (United States) Jedidiah Cunningham
- (United States) Derk Pelle

Source: FIH
