= Martín Rodríguez (field hockey) =

Chilean field hockey player

Martín
Personal information
- Full name: Martín Hernán Rodríguez Ducaud
- Born: 26 March 1990 (age 36) Santiago, Chile
- Height: 174 cm (5 ft 9 in)
- Weight: 74 kg (163 lb)

Sport
- Sport: Field hockey
- Position: Forward
- Club: Sport Francés
National team
Years	Team	Caps	Goals
2008–	Chile	146	(91)
2008–2009	Chile U–21	15	(11)
Medal record
Men's field hockey
Representing Chile
Pan American Games
Bronze medal – third place	2011 Guadalajara	Team
Bronze medal – third place	2015 Toronto	Team
South American Games
Silver medal – second place	2014 Santiago	Team
Silver medal – second place	2018 Cochabamba	Team
Pan American Junior Championship
Silver medal – second place	2008 Port of Spain	Team

Martín Hernán Rodríguez Ducaud (born 26 March 1990) is a Chilean field hockey player.

== Career ==
=== Junior national team ===
In 2008, Rodríguez debuted for the Chile U–21 team at the Pan American Junior Championship in Port of Spain, winning a silver medal.

After qualifying for the 2009 FIH Junior World Cup, Rodríguez again represented the junior national team at the tournament.

=== Los Diablos ===
Rodríguez made his senior international debut in 2008, at the South American Championship in Montevideo.

Since his debut, Rodríguez has been a constant fixture in the Los Diablos team.

During his career, Rodríguez has medalled twice at the Pan American Games, winning bronze at both the 2011 and 2015 games, in Guadalajara and Toronto respectively. He also won silver at the 2014 and 2018 South American Games, in Santiago and Cochabamba respectively.

In 2019, he represented Chile at the Pan American Games in Lima and the 2018–19 FIH Series Finals in Le Touquet.
