= Nahuel Salis =

Argentine field hockey player

Personal information
- Born: 6 August 1989 (age 36) San Martín, Buenos Aires, Argentina

Sport
- Sport: Field hockey
- Position: Midfielder / Forward
- Club: Zürich
Senior career
Years	Team	Caps	Goals
–2010	Mitre	-	-
2010–2011	Leuven	-	-
2011–2017	Mitre	-	-
2017–2020	Gantoise	-	-
2020–2023	Daring	-	-
National team
Years	Team	Caps	Goals
2010–2021	Argentina	87	(10)
Medal record
Men's field hockey
Representing Argentina
Pan American Cup
Gold medal – first place	2013 Brampton
South American Championship
Gold medal – first place	2010 Rio de Janeiro
Gold medal – first place	2013 Santiago
Hockey World League
Silver medal – second place	2016–17 Bhubaneswar	Team
Pan American Junior Championship
Gold medal – first place	2008 Port of Spain
- Updated on 5 September 2023

Nahuel Salis (born 6 August 1989) is an Argentine field hockey player who plays as a midfielder or forward for Swiss club Zürich. He played a total of 87 times for the Argentine national team from 2010 until 2021.

He competed in the 2020 Summer Olympics.

== Club career ==
Salis played for Mitre in Argentina before moving to Europe to play for Leuven in Belgium for one season. In 2017 he returned to Belgium to play for Gantoise. The season prior to the 2020 Olympics he moved to another Belgian club Royal Daring. In 2023 he left Belgium to play for Zürich in Switzerland.
