= Leandro Tolini =

Argentine field hockey player

Personal information
- Full name: José Leandro Tolini
- Born: 14 March 1990 (age 36) Buenos Aires, Argentina

Sport
- Sport: Field hockey
- Position: Defender
- Club: TSV Mannheim
Youth career
- Team
- –: Ba. Na. De.
Senior career
Years	Team	Caps	Goals
–2010	Ba. Na. De.	-	-
2010–2011	Waterloo Ducks	-	-
2011–2012	Taburiente	-	-
2012–2014	Ba. Na. De.	-	-
2014–2018	Club de Campo	-	-
2018–2021	Gantoise	-	-
2021–2022	Tilburg	-	-
2022–present	TSV Mannheim	-	-
National team
Years	Team	Caps	Goals
2010–present	Argentina	94	(48)
Medal record
Men's field hockey
Representing Argentina
Pan American Games
Gold medal – first place	2019 Lima	Team
Pan American Cup
Gold medal – first place	2013 Brampton
Gold medal – first place	2022 Santiago
South American Championship
Gold medal – first place	2010 Rio de Janeiro
Pan American Junior Championship
Gold medal – first place	2008 Port of Spain
- Updated on 29 June 2022

José Leandro Tolini (born 14 March 1990) is an Argentine field hockey player who plays as a defender for German Bundesliga club TSV Mannheim and the Argentina national team.

== Club career ==
In 2010, Tolini moved to Belgium to play for the Waterloo Ducks. After one season, he moved to Spain to play for Taburiente who he also left after one season to return to Argentina to play for Ba. Na. De. For the 2014–15 season he moved back to Europe to play for Club de Campo. After four seasons in Spain, he moved back to Belgium to play for Gantoise. In April 2013, his contract at Gantoise was terminated early because he participated in the FIH Pro League for his national team and he couldn't return in time to play enough matches at the end of the Belgian Hockey League season. In April 2021 he signed for two years for Dutch Hoofdklasse club Tilburg. He scored 14 goals in his first season in Tilburg. Even though he had signed for two season he only stayed for one year because Tilburg were relegated from the Hoofdklasse. He joined German Bundesliga club TSV Mannheim in June 2022.

== International career ==
Tolini was a part of the Argentina squad which won the 2013 Pan American Cup. In July 2019, he was selected in the Argentina squad for the 2019 Pan American Games. They won the gold medal by defeating Canada 5–2 in the final. He was the joint-topscorer of the competition with ten goals together with Maico Casella.
