= Matías Paredes =

Argentine field hockey player

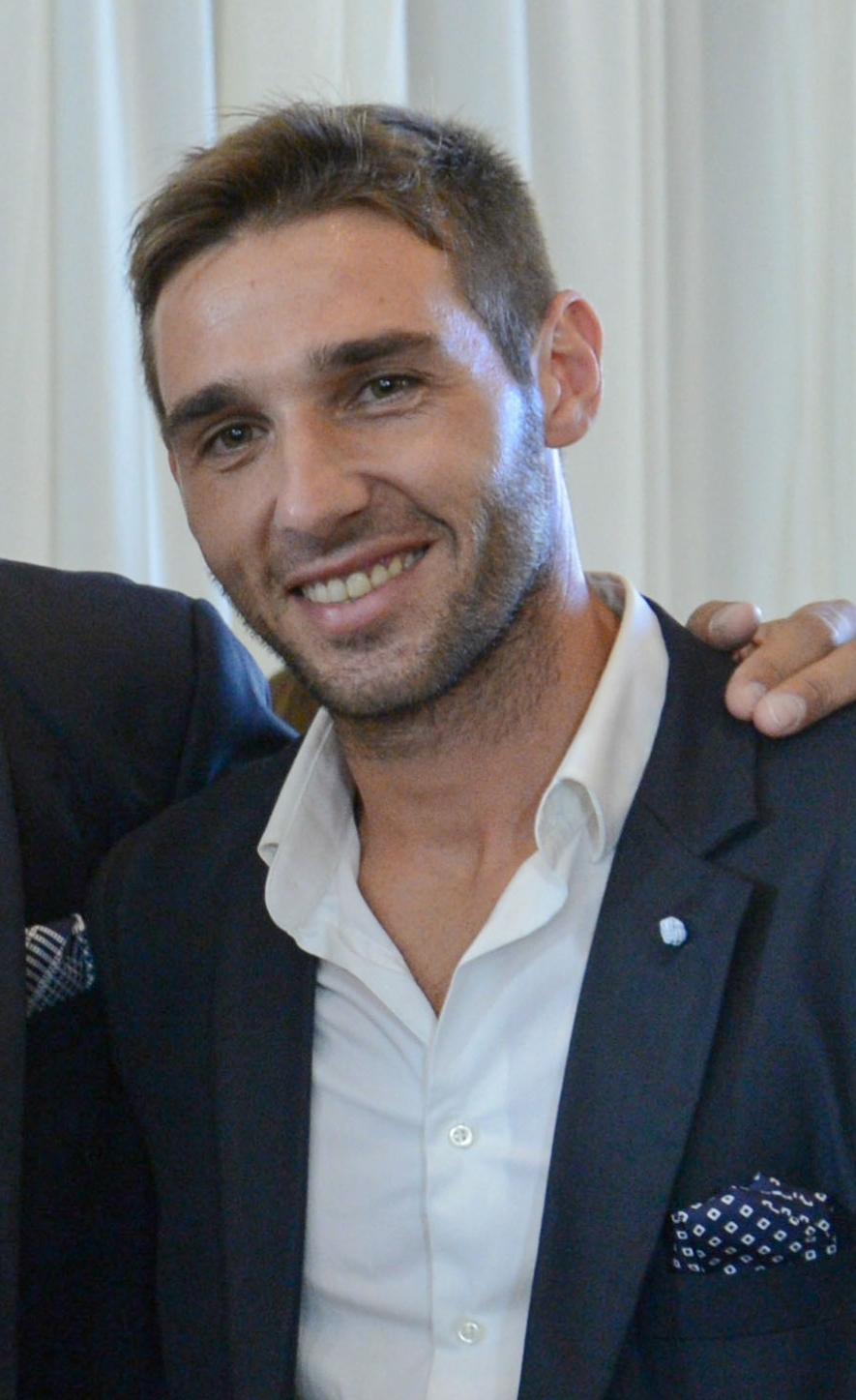

Personal information
- Full name: Matías Enrique Paredes
- Born: 1 February 1982 (age 44) Quilmes, Argentina
- Height: 1.76 m (5 ft 9 in)
- Weight: 73 kg (161 lb)

Sport
- Sport: Field hockey
- Position: Midfielder / Forward
- Club: Ducilo
Youth career
- Team
- –: Ducilo
Senior career
Years	Team	Caps	Goals
–2002	Ducilo	-	-
2002–2003	UHC Hamburg	-	-
–	Laren	-	-
–	SCHC	-	-
–	Ducilo	-	-
National team
Years	Team	Caps	Goals
2001–2019	Argentina	356	(101)
Medal record
Men's field hockey
Representing Argentina
Olympic Games
Gold medal – first place	2016 Rio de Janeiro	Team
World Cup
Bronze medal – third place	2014 The Hague
Pan American Games
Gold medal – first place	2003 Santo Domingo	Team
Gold medal – first place	2011 Guadalajara	Team
Gold medal – first place	2015 Toronto	Team
Gold medal – first place	2019 Lima	Team
Silver medal – second place	2007 Rio de Janeiro	Team
Pan American Cup
Gold medal – first place	2013 Toronto
Gold medal – first place	2017 Lancaster
Bronze medal – third place	2009 Santiago
South American Games
Gold medal – first place	2014 Santiago	Team
South American Championship
Gold medal – first place	2013 Santiago
Junior World Cup
Silver medal – second place	2001 Hobart
Pan American Junior Championship
Gold medal – first place	2000 Santiago
- Updated on 2 November 2019

Matías Enrique Paredes (born 1 February 1982) is an Argentine field hockey player who plays as a midfielder or forward for Ducilo and the Argentine national team.

== Club career ==
Paredes started his club career with Ducilo at age four in his native Argentina, before moving to Germany to play with UHC Hamburg in 2002. He then moved on to the Netherlands to play for Laren. He also played for SCHC in Bilthoven, Netherlands.

== International career ==
Paredes made his debut for the national squad in 2001, and competed for his native country in the 2004 Summer Olympics and 2012 Summer Olympics. With his national squad, Matías has won the bronze medal at the 2014 Men's Hockey World Cup and four gold medals at the Pan American Games (2003, 2011, 2015 and 2019). He has twice been named as one of the top 10 young players in the world by the International Field Hockey Council. In 2003 he was awarded the Silver Olimpia for the Best Argentine Hockey Player.
