= 2008 Men's Pan American Junior Championship =

Field hockey tournament

Men's Pan American Junior Championship
Tournament details
- Host country: Trinidad and Tobago
- City: Port of Spain
- Dates: 17–26 October
- Teams: 11 (from 1 confederation)

Final positions
- Champions: Argentina (9th title)
- Runner-up: Chile
- Third place: United States

Tournament statistics
- Matches played: 35
- Goals scored: 251 (7.17 per match)
- Top scorer: (Argentina) Leandro Tolini (17 goals)
- Best player: (Argentina) Leandro Tolini

The 2008 Men's Pan American Junior Championship was the 9th edition of the Pan American Junior Championship for men. It was held from 17 to 26 October 2008 in Port of Spain. Cuba.

The tournament served as a qualifier for the 2009 Junior World Cup, held in Singapore and Johor Bahru, Malaysia in June 2009.

Argentina won the tournament for the 9th time, defeating Chile 3–0 in the final. The United States won the bronze medal by defeating Canada 7–6 in penalties following a 2–2 draw.

== Participating nations ==
A total of eleven teams participated in the tournament:

- Argentina
- Barbados
- Brazil
- Canada
- Chile
- Guyana
- Jamaica
- Mexico
- Puerto Rico
- Trinidad and Tobago
- United States

== Results ==
=== Preliminary round ===
==== Pool A ====
Pos	Team	Pld	W	D	L	GF	GA	GD	Pts	Qualification
1	Argentina	4	4	0	0	41	2	+39	12	Advanced to Semi-finals
2	United States	4	3	0	1	14	11	+3	9	Advanced to Semi-finals
3	Trinidad and Tobago (H)	4	2	0	2	11	12	−1	6	
4	Puerto Rico	4	1	0	3	8	16	−8	3	
5	Jamaica	4	0	0	4	0	33	−33	0	

Source: Pan American Hockey Federation
Rules for classification: 1) points; 2) goal difference; 3) goals scored; 4) head-to-head result.
(H) Hosts

17 October 2008
19:45

Trinidad and Tobago	3–1	Puerto Rico
Toussaint 6'; Tang Nian 31'; Butler 61'	Report	Jó. Agosto 52'

Umpires:
Arturo Vásquez Serrano (MEX)
Jamar Springer (BAR)

17 October 2008
21:45

Argentina	15–0	Jamaica
Tolini 3', 7', 12', 21', 34', 51', 58'; Aldino 35'; Agulleiro 42', 46', 47', 65'; Salis 60'; Montelli 61'; Camacho 67'	Report

Umpires:
Devin Hooper (GUY)
Ayden Shrives (RSA)

18 October 2008
19:30

United States	7–0	Jamaica
Ginolfi 4'; Holt 15', 44', 50', 64', 67'; Martínez 19'	Report

Umpires:
Fernando Gómez (ARG)
Coen van Bunge (NED)

18 October 2008
21:30

Puerto Rico	1–9	Argentina
Colón 39'	Report	Tolini 12'; Mazzilli 18'; Barreiros 21', 56', 66'; Camacho 31'; Aldino 38', 57'; Colombo 50'

Umpires:
Haider Rasool (PAK)
Arturo Vásquez Serrano (MEX)

20 October 2008
10:30

Argentina	9–0	United States
Aldino 12', 67'; Salas 5'; Tolini 18', 30', 35'; Agulleiro 58', 60'; Mazzilli 62'	Report

Umpires:
Coen van Bunge (NED)
Ayden Shrives (RSA)

20 October 2008
14:00

Jamaica	0–6	Trinidad and Tobago
	Report	Toussaint 32'; Jaikaransingh 37'; Vieira 43', 58'; Q. Clarke 47'; Butler 64'

Umpires:
Diego Barbas (ARG)
Haider Rasool (PAK)

21 October 2008
10:30

Puerto Rico	1–4	United States
Colón 32'	Report	Holt 17', 40', 55'; Szoke 30'

Umpires:
Donny Gobinsingh (TTO)
Devin Hooper (GUY)

21 October 2008
14:00

Trinidad and Tobago	1–8	Argentina
Pierre 31'	Report	Tolini 8', 18', 65'; Barreiros 11'; Mazzilli 20', 42'; Zocchi 56'; Oleastro 69'

Umpires:
Haider Rasool (PAK)
Grant Hundley (USA)

23 October 2008
18:00

Jamaica	0–5	Puerto Rico
	Report	Feliciano 2', 53'; Jó. Agosto 17'; Colón 24', 30'

Umpires:
Jamar Springer (BAR)
Jonathan Stoller (CAN)

23 October 2008
20:00

United States	3–1	Trinidad and Tobago
Holt 11'; Szoke 18'; Walsh 19'	Report	Lum Kit 56'

Umpires:
Ayden Shrives (RSA)
Coen van Bunge (NED)

==== Pool B ====
Pos	Team	Pld	W	D	L	GF	GA	GD	Pts	Qualification
1	Chile	5	4	0	1	37	2	+35	12	Advanced to Semi-finals
2	Canada	5	4	0	1	27	4	+23	12	Advanced to Semi-finals
3	Mexico	5	4	0	1	29	9	+20	12	
4	Barbados	5	2	0	3	23	17	+6	6	
5	Brazil	5	1	0	4	2	30	−28	3	
6	Guyana	5	0	0	5	1	57	−56	0	

Source: Pan American Hockey Federation
Rules for classification: 1) points; 2) goal difference; 3) goals scored; 4) head-to-head result.

17 October 2008
10:00

Canada	15–0	Guyana
Stewart 1'; Noronha-Teixeira 5'; Watson 11', 67', 70'; Norton 12', 65', 66'; Currie 17'; Erickson 31'; Meakin 42', 43'; Paget 51'; Wiggins 54'; Self 62'	Report

Umpires:
Diego Barbas (ARG)
Grant Hundley (USA)

17 October 2008
14:30

Barbados	0–6	Chile
	Report	S. Richter 25'; Kapsch 28'; Achondo 30'; Rodríguez 40'; J. Richter 46', 65'

Umpires:
Coen van Bunge (NED)
Jonathan Stoller (CAN)

17 October 2008
17:30

Mexico	8–0	Brazil
Aguilar 8', 21', 50'; Vásquez 17', 18', 25'; Cabrera 40'; León 45'	Report

Umpires:
Donny Gobinsingh (TTO)
Fernando Gómez (ARG)

18 October 2008
13:30

Canada	3–2	Barbados
Pereira 22'; Meakin 39'; Bissett 67'	Report	Clarke 35'; Warner 49'

Umpires:
Ayden Shrives (RSA)
Diego Barbas (ARG)

18 October 2008
15:30

Chile	6–0	Brazil
J. Richter 11', 39', 44'; Rodríguez 28'; Fuenzalida 31'; Achondo 53'	Report

Umpires:
Devin Hooper (GUY)
Donny Gobinsingh (TTO)

18 October 2008
17:30

Guyana	0–13	Mexico
	Report	Aguilar 4', 35', 37', 39', 51', 70'; Bórquez 5', 10', 33'; Vásquez 10'; Cárdenas 27'; Galván 29'; Pedraza 48'

Umpires:
Grant Hundley (USA)
Jamar Springer (BAR)

20 October 2008
16:00

Brazil	0–9	Barbados
	Report	Walcott 15'; Warner 25'; Leacock 30', 61'; Small 38'; Clarke 43'; Jordan 53', 66'; Lewis 64'

Umpires:
Jonathan Stoller (CAN)
Arturo Vásquez Serrano (MEX)

20 October 2008
18:00

Chile	19–0	Guyana
Rodríguez 8', 9'; S. Richter 13', 20'; Cortés 23'; J. Richter 29', 43', 45', 58', 62'; Fuenzalida 33'; T. Tegtmeier 35'; Kapsch 38'; Soruco 50'; A. Tegtmeier 51', 67'; Krussig 65', 66'; Eggers de Juán 70'	Report

Umpires:
Donny Gobinsingh (TTO)
Jamar Springer (BAR)

20 October 2008
20:00

Mexico	1–0	Canada
Aguilar 52'	Report

Umpires:
Fernando Gómez (ARG)
Grant Hundley (USA)

21 October 2008
16:00

Brazil	2–0	Guyana
P. Van der Heijden 21'; Y. Van der Heijden 37'	Report

Umpires:
Arturo Vásquez Serrano (MEX)
Jonathan Stoller (CAN)

21 October 2008
18:00

Barbados	4–7	Mexico
Warner 43', 48', 57'; Jordan 47'	Report	Cabrera 4'; Vásquez 6', 22', 65'; Bórquez 33'; Aguilar 43', 51'

Umpires:
Diego Barbas (ARG)
Ayden Shrives (RSA)

21 October 2008
20:00

Chile	1–2	Canada
J. Richter 13'	Report	Erickson 33'; Bissett 63'

Umpires:
Coen van Bunge (NED)
Fernando Gómez (ARG)

23 October 2008
10:30

Guyana	1–8	Barbados
Gill 68'	Report	Warner 13', 16', 18', 38'; Harper 29'; Wharton 42', 64'; Jordan 47'

Umpires:
Haider Rasool (PAK)
Arturo Vásquez Serrano (MEX)

23 October 2008
14:00

Mexico	0–5	Chile
	Report	Fuenzalida 12'; T. Tegtmeier 28'; S. Richter 29', 69'; Kapsch 42'

Umpires:
Diego Barbas (ARG)
Fernando Gómez (ARG)

23 October 2008
16:00

Canada	7–0	Brazil
Meakin 6'; Erickson 14', 47'; Norton 39'; Watson 41'; Pereira 64', 66'	Report

Umpires:
Donny Gobinsingh (TTO)
Grant Hundley (USA)

=== Classification round ===
==== Ninth to eleventh place classification ====
Crossover
24 October
Jamaica	7
Guyana	0

Ninth place
26 October
Brazil	3
Jamaica	0

===== Crossover =====
24 October 2008
11:00

Jamaica	7–0	Guyana
Burton 19', 28', 47'; Gordon 21'; Hicks 32'; Rowe 40'; Davis 58'	Report

Umpires:
Arturo Vásquez Serrano (MEX)
Jonathan Stoller (CAN)

===== Ninth and tenth place =====
26 October 2008
08:00

Brazil	3–0	Jamaica
P. Van der Heijden 40'; Y. Van der Heijden 42'; Cantarino 51'	Report

Umpires:
Jamar Springer (BAR)
Devin Hooper (GUY)

==== Fifth to eighth place classification ====
Crossover
24 October
Trinidad and Tobago	3
Barbados	8
25 October
Mexico	3
Puerto Rico	1

Fifth Place
26 October
Barbados	2
Mexico	4
Seventh Place
26 October
Trinidad and Tobago	6
Puerto Rico	1

===== Crossover =====
24 October 2008
13:30

Trinidad and Tobago	3–8	Barbados
Tang Nian 34', 54'; Vieira 70'	Report	Jordan 11', 64'; Warner 17', 19', 44'; Small 24'; Wharton 29'; Davis 45'

Umpires:
Devin Hooper (GUY)
Ayden Shrives (RSA)

25 October 2008
09:00

Mexico	3–1	Puerto Rico
Aguilar 19', 48'; Cabrera 22'	Report	Feliciano 35'

Umpires:
Haider Rasool (PAK)
Donny Gobinsingh (TTO)

===== Seventh and eighth place =====
26 October 2008
10:30

Trinidad and Tobago	6–1	Puerto Rico
Pierre 16', 21', 47'; Butler 41'; Toussaint 54'; Farrell 58'	Report	Colón 8'

Umpires:
Arturo Vásquez Serrano (MEX)
Haider Rasool (PAK)

===== Fifth and sixth place =====
26 October 2008
14:00

Barbados	2–4	Mexico
Jordan 5', 21'	Report	Vásquez 2', 15'; Aguilar 14', 42'

Umpires:
Donny Gobinsingh (TTO)
Fernando Gómez (ARG)

==== First to fourth place classification ====
Semi-finals
24 October
Argentina	6
Canada	1
24 October
Chile	6
United States	0

Final
26 October
Argentina	3
Chile	0
Third Place
26 October
Canada	2 (6)
United States (pen.)	2 (7)

===== Semi-finals =====
24 October 2008
18:30

Argentina	6–1	Canada
Tolini 17', 34', 35'; Agulleiro 20'; Gebhardt 67'; Aldino 69'	Report	Noronha-Teixeira 24'

Umpires:
Coen van Bunge (NED)
Grant Hundley (USA)

24 October 2008
21:00

Chile	6–0	United States
Krussig 3'; J. Richter 25', 41', 56'; Rodríguez 57'; S. Richter 61'	Report

Umpires:
Fernando Gómez (ARG)
Diego Barbas (ARG)

===== Third and fourth place =====
26 October 2008
16:30

Canada	2–2	United States
Self 13'; Norton 67'	Report	Holt 18', 66'
Penalties
	6–7

Umpires:
Diego Barbas (ARG)
Coen van Bunge (NED)

===== Final =====
26 October 2008
19:00

Argentina	3–0	Chile
Mazzilli 29', 66'; Montelli 31'	Report

Umpires:
Grant Hundley (USA)
Ayden Shrives (RSA)

== Awards ==
Top Goalscorer	Player of the Tournament	Goalkeeper of the Tournament
(Argentina) Leandro Tolini	(Argentina) Leandro Tolini	(United States) Kevin Segeren

== Final rankings ==
Pos	Team	Pld	W	D	L	GF	GA	GD	Pts	Qualification
1st place, gold medalist(s)	Argentina	6	6	0	0	50	3	+47	18	2009 FIH Junior World Cup
2nd place, silver medalist(s)	Chile	7	5	0	2	43	5	+38	15	2009 FIH Junior World Cup
3rd place, bronze medalist(s)	United States	6	3	1	2	16	19	−3	10	2009 FIH Junior World Cup
4	Canada	7	4	1	2	30	12	+18	13	
5	Mexico	7	6	0	1	36	12	+24	18	
6	Barbados	7	3	0	4	33	24	+9	9	
7	Trinidad and Tobago (H)	6	3	0	3	20	21	−1	9	
8	Puerto Rico	6	1	0	5	10	25	−15	3	
9	Brazil	6	2	0	4	5	30	−25	6	
10	Jamaica	6	1	0	5	7	36	−29	3	
11	Guyana	6	0	0	6	1	64	−63	0	

Source: Pan American Hockey Federation
(H) Hosts

== Goalscorers ==
There were 251 goals scored in 35 matches, for an average of 7.17 goals per match.

17 goals

- (Argentina) Leandro Tolini

16 goals

- (Mexico) Francisco Aguilar

14 goals

- (Chile) Jan Richter

12 goals

- (Barbados) Ché Warner

11 goals

- (United States) William Holt

9 goals

- (Mexico) Ismael Vásquez

8 goals

- (Barbados) Dario Jordan

7 goals

- (Argentina) Juán Crúz Agulleiro

6 goals

- (Argentina) Alan Aldino
- (Argentina) Agustín Mazzilli
- (Chile) Sven Richter

5 goals

- (Canada) Derrick Norton
- (Chile) Martín Rodríguez
- (Puerto Rico) Manuel Colón

4 goals

- (Argentina) Guido Barreiros
- (Canada) Mark Erickson
- (Canada) Connor Meakin
- (Canada) Jesse Watson
- (Mexico) Edgard Bórquez
- (Trinidad and Tobago) Mickel Pierre

3 goals

- (Barbados) Shonkeel Wharton
- (Canada) Keegan Pereira
- (Chile) Andrés Fuenzalida
- (Chile) Sebastián Kapsch
- (Chile) Thomás Krussig
- (Jamaica) Charles Burton
- (Mexico) Eduardo Cabrera
- (Puerto Rico) Ottus Feliciano
- (Trinidad and Tobago) Cogie Butler
- (Trinidad and Tobago) Matthew Tang Nian
- (Trinidad and Tobago) Akim Toussaint
- (Trinidad and Tobago) Andrew Vieira

2 goals

- (Argentina) Santiago Camacho
- (Argentina) Santiago Montelli
- (Barbados) Errol Clarke
- (Barbados) Ramón Leacock
- (Barbados) Jemar Small
- (Brazil) Patrick van der Heijden
- (Brazil) Yuri van der Heijden
- (Canada) Stephen Bissett
- (Canada) Devohn Noronha-Teixeira
- (Canada) Taylor Self
- (Chile) Ricardo Achondo
- (Chile) Antonio Tegtmeier
- (Chile) Thomás Tegtmeier
- (Puerto Rico) Jóseph Agosto
- (United States) Nicholas Szoke

1 goal

- (Argentina) Lucás Colombo
- (Argentina) Martín Gebhardt
- (Argentina) Felipé Oleastro
- (Argentina) Ignacio Salas
- (Argentina) Nahuel Salis
- (Argentina) Sebastián Zocchi
- (Barbados) Laurando Davis
- (Barbados) Deron Harper
- (Barbados) Dario Lewis
- (Barbados) Jabari Walcott
- (Brazil) Rogerio Cantarino
- (Canada) Bruce Currie
- (Canada) Stephen Paget
- (Canada) Hudson Stewart
- (Canada) Graham Wiggins
- (Chile) Estebán Cortés
- (Chile) Felipé Eggers de Juán
- (Chile) Ishmael Soruco
- (Guyana) Shaka Gill
- (Jamaica) Jerome Davis
- (Jamaica) Giovanni Gordon
- (Jamaica) Orville Hicks
- (Jamaica) Gerren Rowe
- (Mexico) Oscár Cárdenas
- (Mexico) Oscár Galván
- (Mexico) Míguel León
- (Mexico) Guillermo Pedraza
- (Trinidad and Tobago) Quinn Clarke
- (Trinidad and Tobago) Evan Farrell
- (Trinidad and Tobago) Dominic Jaikaransingh
- (Trinidad and Tobago) Dev Lum Kit
- (United States) Jonathan Ginolfi
- (United States) Manuel Martínez
- (United States) Liam Walsh
