= Lucas Rossi =

Argentine field hockey player

Personal information
- Full name: Lucas Rafael Rossi
- Born: 2 June 1985 (age 41) Buenos Aires, Argentina

Sport
- Sport: Field hockey
- Position: Midfielder
- Club: Beerschot
Senior career
Years	Team	Caps	Goals
–2005	Banco Provincia	-	-
2005–2006	Harvestehude	-	-
2006–2007	Banco Provincia	-	-
2007–2010	Orée	-	-
2010–2011	Léopold	-	-
2011–2012	Banco Provincia	-	-
2012–2014	Léopold	-	-
2014–2015	Banco Provincia	-	-
2015–2021	Beerschot	-	-
2021–2023	Braxgata	-	-
2023–present	Beerschot	-	-
National team
Years	Team	Caps	Goals
2006–2021	Argentina	217	(24)
Medal record
Men's field hockey
Representing Argentina
Olympic Games
Gold medal – first place	2016 Rio de Janeiro	Team
World Cup
Bronze medal – third place	2014 The Hague
Pan American Games
Gold medal – first place	2011 Guadalajara	Team
Gold medal – first place	2015 Toronto	Team
Silver medal – second place	2007 Rio de Janeiro	Team
Pan American Cup
Gold medal – first place	2017 Lancaster
South American Games
Gold medal – first place	2006 Buenos Aires	Team
South American Championship
Gold medal – first place	2013 Santiago
Hockey World League
Silver medal – second place	2016–17 Bhubaneswar	Team
Junior World Cup
Gold medal – first place	2005 Rotterdam
Pan American Junior Championship
Gold medal – first place	2005 Havana
- Updated on 5 September 2023

Lucas Rafael Rossi (born 2 June 1985) is an Argentine field hockey player who plays as a midfielder for Belgian club Beerschot. He played a total of 247 times for the Argentina national team from 2006 until 2021.

== Club career ==
Rossi played for Banco Provincia in Argentina. During the 2005–06 season, he played for Harvestehude in the German Bundesliga. He returned to Europe for the 2007–08 season when he signed for Orée in Belgium. He left Orée in 2010 for Léopold. After one season at Léopold he returned to Argentina to focus on the national team in preparation for the 2012 Summer Olympics. After the 2012 Olympics he returned to Léopold. Since 2015, he has played for Royal Beerschot. It was announced in March 2021 that he would join Braxgata for the 2021–22 season. After two seasons at Braxgata, he returned to Beerschot as they play in the Belgian second division.

== International career ==
At the 2012 Summer Olympics, Rossi competed for the national team in the men's tournament. He was a part of the Argentina squad which won the gold medal at the 2016 Summer Olympics. Rossi has won the bronze medal at the 2014 Men's Hockey World Cup and two gold medals at the Pan American Games. He retired from international hockey after the 2018 World Cup to spend more time with his family. In October 2019, he returned in the national team as he was called up for the October 2019 Europe tour.
