= 2005 Men's Pan American Junior Championship =

Field hockey tournament

Men's Junior Pan-Am Championship
Tournament details
- Host country: Cuba
- City: Havana
- Dates: 16–27 February
- Teams: 11 (from 1 confederation)

Final positions
- Champions: Argentina (8th title)
- Runner-up: Chile
- Third place: Mexico

Tournament statistics
- Matches played: 35
- Goals scored: 320 (9.14 per match)
- Top scorer: (Argentina) Pedro Ibarra (18 goals)
- Best player: (United States) Patrick Harris

The 2005 Men's Junior Pan-Am Championship was the 8th edition of the Pan American Junior Championship for men. It was held from 16 to 27 February 2005 in Havana. Cuba.

The tournament served as a qualifier for the 2005 Junior World Cup, held in Rotterdam, Netherlands in June and July 2005.

Argentina won the tournament for the 8th time, defeating Chile 7–0 in the final. Mexico won the bronze medal by defeating the United States 4–0 in the third and fourth place playoff.

== Participating nations ==
A total of eleven teams participated in the tournament:

- Argentina
- Barbados
- Canada
- Chile
- Cuba
- ~~Dominican Republic~~ ^{WITHDREW}
- Jamaica
- Mexico
- Puerto Rico
- Trinidad and Tobago
- United States
- Venezuela

== Results ==
=== First round ===
==== Pool A ====
Pos	Team	Pld	W	D	L	GF	GA	GD	Pts	Qualification
1	Argentina	4	4	0	0	53	4	+49	12	Semi-finals
2	United States	4	3	0	1	12	12	0	9	Semi-finals
3	Cuba (H)	4	2	0	2	11	17	−6	6	
4	Barbados	4	1	0	3	10	23	−13	3	
5	Jamaica	4	0	0	4	1	31	−30	0	

Source: PanAmHockey
Rules for classification: 1) points; 2) goal difference; 3) goals scored; 4) head-to-head result.
(H) Hosts

16 February 2005
09:00

Argentina	17–1	Jamaica
Callioni 8', 11', 55'; T. Argento 9', 48'; Ibarra 14', 27', 29'; Vila 20', 63'; Corradini 22', 51'; Saladino 31', 35', 42'; Rossi 56'; Brunet 66'	Report	Davis 25'

Umpires:
Michiel Bruning (NED)
Albert Marcano (TTO)

16 February 2005
14:00

Barbados	1–5	United States
Forde 41'	Report	P. Harris 16', 22', 37', 60'; D. Jordan 25'

Umpires:
Daniel López (URU)
Thomas Gantz (CHL)

17 February 2005
14:00

United States	2–10	Argentina
P. Harris 67', 67'	Report	Alonso 2'; Callioni 5'; Vila 10', 65'; L. Argento 18'; Ibarra 38', 55', 62'; T. Argento 42'; Rossi 59'

Umpires:
Marc Knule (FRA)
Javier Palomo (MEX)

18 February 2005
09:00

Jamaica	0–6	Cuba
	Report	Aguilera 16'; Makenci 30', 52', 60'; Quirola 43'; J. González 69'

Umpires:
Sukh Bajwa (CAN)
Thomas Gantz (CHL)

19 February 2005
11:00

Barbados	5–0	Jamaica
Franklin 34', 54'; Harding 49'; Griffith 59'; Forde 68'	Report

Umpires:
Luis Villa (CUB)
German Montes de Oca (ARG)

19 February 2005
14:00

Cuba	0–12	Argentina
	Report	T. Argento 2', 46', 58', 67'; Alonso 15', 63'; Ibarra 16', 18', 44'; Saladino 33'; Brunet 49'; Vila 55'

Umpires:
Marc Knule (FRA)
Gus Soteriades (USA)

21 February 2005
09:00

Barbados	3–4	Cuba
Jules 5'; Davis 11'; Small 40'	Report	Díaz 45'; Olivares 50'; Aguilera 57'; Quirola 65'

Umpires:
Javier Palomo (MEX)
Daniel Gonzáles (PER)

21 February 2005
11:00

Jamaica	0–3	United States
	Report	P. Harris 14', 41'; S. Harris 20'

Umpires:
Armando Bajares (VEN)
Sukh Bajwa (CAN)

22 February 2005
11:00

Cuba	1–2	United States
Quirola 34'	Report	D. Jordan 4'; P. Harris 41'

Umpires:
Thomas Gantz (CHL)
German Montes de Oca (ARG)

22 February 2005
16:00

Argentina	14–1	Barbados
Ibarra 5', 9', 12', 38'; Saladino 10', 57'; Callioni 19', 48'; Vila 21'; Tisera 30'; Alonso 33', 41', 51', 68'	Report	Small 59'

Umpires:
Gus Soteriades (USA)
Marc Kunle (FRA)

==== Pool B ====
Pos	Team	Pld	W	D	L	GF	GA	GD	Pts	Qualification
1	Chile	5	5	0	0	64	2	+62	15	Semi-finals
2	Mexico	5	4	0	1	41	10	+31	12	Semi-finals
3	Canada	5	3	0	2	42	9	+33	9	
4	Trinidad and Tobago	5	2	0	3	32	11	+21	6	
5	Puerto Rico	5	1	0	4	6	60	−54	3	
6	Venezuela	5	0	0	5	0	93	−93	0	

Source: PanAmHockey
Rules for classification: 1) points; 2) goal difference; 3) goals scored; 4) head-to-head result.

16 February 2005
16:00

Puerto Rico	5–0	Venezuela
	Report

Umpires:
Marc Knule (FRA)
Kim Hong-lae (KOR)

17 February 2005
09:00

Chile	5–0	Trinidad and Tobago
	Report

Umpires:
Gus Soteriades (USA)
Luis Villa (CUB)

17 February 2005
11:00

Canada	2–3	Mexico
Pearson 12'; Roberts 32'	Report	Martínez 46'; Galvan 56'; Gómez 66'

Umpires:
Armando Bajares (VEN)
German Montes de Oca (ARG)

18 February 2005
11:00

Trinidad and Tobago	10–0	Puerto Rico
	Report

Umpires:
Daniel Gonzáles (PER)
Daniel López (URU)

18 February 2005
14:00

Venezuela	0–23	Canada
	Report	Roberts 3', 33', 41', 58', 65'; Hildreth 5', 63'; Tupper 9'; Jameson 11', 19', 29', 30', 44', 67'; J. Virdi 14', 42'; H. Virdi 21'; Pearson 28'; Wright 49', 55', 68'; Hobkirk 60', 64'

Umpires:
Roger Broomes (BAR)
Albert Marcano (TTO)

18 February 2005
16:00

Mexico	0–5	Chile
	Report

Umpires:
Michiel Bruning (NED)
Kim Hong-lae (KOR)

20 February 2005
09:00

Venezuela	0–20	Mexico
	Report

Umpires:
Sukh Bajwa (CAN)
Daniel Gonzáles (PER)

20 February 2005
11:00

Chile	23–0	Puerto Rico
	Report

Umpires:
Armando Bajares (VEN)
Roger Broomes (BAR)

20 February 2005
14:00

Canada	2–0	Trinidad and Tobago
Wright 7'; Pearson 47'	Report

Umpires:
Javier Palomo (MEX)
Michiel Bruning (NED)

21 February 2005
14:00

Puerto Rico	0–14	Mexico
	Report

Umpires:
Kim Hong-lae (KOR)
Roger Broomes (BAR)

21 February 2005
16:00

Trinidad and Tobago	19–0	Venezuela
	Report

Umpires:
Luis Villa (CUB)
Daniel López (URU)

22 February 2005
09:00

Canada	2–5	Chile
Hildreth 30'; Pearson 37'	Report	Berczely 24', 39', 61'; Zarhi 66'; Kapsch 68'

Umpires:
Albert Marcano (TTO)
Michiel Bruning (NED)

23 February 2005
09:00

Puerto Rico	1–13	Canada
Márquez 15'	Report	Roberts 4', 9'; Hildreth 11', 48'; Wright 28'; Pearson 36', 38'; Joseph 46'; H. Virdi 50', 52', 56', 58', 66'

Umpires:
Luis Villa (CUB)
Daniel Gonzáles (PER)

23 February 2005
11:00

Mexico	4–3	Trinidad and Tobago
	Report

Umpires:
German Montes de Oca (ARG)
Daniel López (URU)

23 February 2005
14:00

Chile	26–0	Venezuela
	Report

Umpires:
Sukh Bajwa (CAN)
Roger Broomes (BAR)

=== Ninth to eleventh place classification ===
Cross-over
25 February
Jamaica	3
Venezuela	0

Fifth place
26 February
Puerto Rico	0
Jamaica	5

==== Cross-over ====
25 February 2005
08:30

Jamaica	3–0	Venezuela
Davis 7'; East 13'; Gardiner 43'	Report

Umpires:
Roger Broomes (JAM)
Daniel Gonzáles (PER)

==== Ninth and tenth place ====
26 February 2005
13:30

Puerto Rico	0–5	Jamaica
	Report	Beach 10', 30', 46'; Kelly 25'; Davis 51'

Umpires:
Luis Villa (CUB)
Daniel Gonzáles (PER)

=== Fifth to eighth place classification ===
Cross-overs
25 February
Cuba	3
Trinidad and Tobago	0
25 February
Canada	5
Barbados	3

Fifth place
27 February
Cuba	1
Canada	2
Seventh place
26 February
Trinidad and Tobago	1
Barbados	4

==== Cross-overs ====
25 February 2005
13:30

Cuba	3–0	Trinidad and Tobago
Díaz 10'; Makenci 26'; Díeguez 40'	Report

Umpires:
Javier Palomo (MEX)
German Montes de Oca (ARG)

25 February 2005
16:00

Canada	5–3	Barbados
Tupper 10'; Wright 14', 47'; Pearson 15'; Roberts 27'	Report	Forde 44', 62'; Harding 52'

Umpires:
Armando Bajares (VEN)
Kim Hong-lae (KOR)

==== Seventh and eighth place ====
26 February 2005
16:00

Trinidad and Tobago	1–4	Barbados
Murray 9'	Report	Franklin 23', 61', 69'; Harding 32'

Umpires:
Thomas Gantz (CHL)
Gus Soteriades (USA)

==== Fifth and sixth place ====
27 February 2005
09:00

Cuba	1–2	Canada
Risquet 64'	Report	Pearson 27'; Virdi 52'

Umpires:
Javier Palomo (MEX)
Daniel López (URU)

=== First to fourth place classification ===
Semi-finals
26 February
Argentina	5
Mexico	0
26 February
Chile (a.e.t)	3
United States	2

Final
27 February
Argentina	7
Chile	0
Third place
27 February
Mexico	4
United States	0

==== Semi-finals ====
26 February 2005
08:30

Argentina	5–0	Mexico
Ibarra 9', 23'; Alonso 21'; T. Argento 40'; Rossi 61'	Report

Umpires:
Marc Knule (FRA)
Sukh Bajwa (CAN)

26 February 2005
11:00

Chile	3–2 (a.e.t.)	United States
Berczely 40', 42', 77'	Report	Jordan 6'; P. Harris 68'

Umpires:
Michiel Bruning (NED)
Albert Marcano (TTO)

==== Third and fourth place ====
27 February 2005
11:30

Mexico	4–0	United States
García 7'; Gómez 11', 25'; Aguayo 15'	Report

Umpires:
Michiel Bruning (NED)
Thomas Gantz (CHL)

==== Final ====
27 February 2005
14:00

Argentina	7–0	Chile
Ibarra 25', 34', 53'; T. Argento 27', 70'; Vila 28', 67'	Report

Umpires:
Kim Hong-lae (KOR)
Gus Soteriades (USA)

== Statistics ==
=== Final standings ===
1. Argentina
2. Chile
3. Mexico
4. United States
5. Canada
6. Cuba
7. Barbados
8. Trinidad and Tobago
9. Jamaica
10. Puerto Rico
11. Venezuela

=== Awards ===
Top Goalscorer	Player of the Tournament	Goalkeeper of the Tournament
(Argentina) Pedro Ibarra	(United States) Patrick Harris	(Jamaica) Donovan Shakespeare
