= Lucas Vila =

Argentine field hockey player (born 1986)

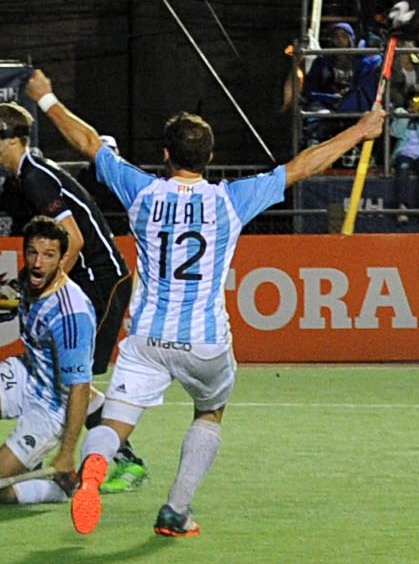

Personal information
- Full name: Lucas Martín Vila
- Born: 23 August 1986 (age 39) Buenos Aires, Argentina
- Height: 1.72 m (5 ft 8 in)
- Weight: 75 kg (165 lb)

Sport
- Sport: Field hockey
- Position: Forward
Senior career
Years	Team	Caps	Goals
–2005	Banco Provincia	-	-
2005–2006	Harvestehude	-	-
2006–2007	Banco Provincia	-	-
2007–2010	Tilburg	-	-
2010–2012	HGC	-	-
2012–2013	Orée	-	-
2013–2014	Den Bosch	-	-
2014–2015	Kalinga Lancers	-	-
2014–2015	Club de Campo	-	-
2015–2017	Real Club de Polo	-	-
2017–2020	Mannheimer HC	-	-
2020–2021	Leuven	-	-
2021–2022	Benalmádena	-	-
National team
Years	Team	Caps	Goals
2005–2023	Argentina	274	(87)
Medal record
Men's field hockey
Representing Argentina
Olympic Games
Gold medal – first place	2016 Rio de Janeiro	Team
World Cup
Bronze medal – third place	2014 The Hague
Pan American Games
Gold medal – first place	2011 Guadalajara	Team
Gold medal – first place	2015 Toronto	Team
Gold medal – first place	2019 Lima	Team
Silver medal – second place	2007 Rio de Janeiro	Team
Pan American Cup
Gold medal – first place	2013 Brampton
Gold medal – first place	2017 Lancaster
Bronze medal – third place	2009 Santiago
Champions Trophy
Bronze medal – third place	2008 Rotterdam
South American Games
Gold medal – first place	2022 Asunción	Team
South American Championship
Gold medal – first place	2013 Santiago
World League
Silver medal – second place	2016–17 Bhubaneswar	Team
Junior World Cup
Gold medal – first place	2005 Rotterdam
Pan American Junior Championship
Gold medal – first place	2005 Havana

Lucas Martín Vila (born 23 August 1986) is an Argentine former field hockey player who played as a forward.

He made his debut for the national squad in 2005, after having played the Junior World Cup in Rotterdam, Netherlands. He played a total of 274 times for the Argentina national team until 2023. His older brothers Matías and Rodrigo were also field hockey players for Argentina.

== International career ==
At the 2012 Summer Olympics, Vila competed for Argentina in the men's tournament. Lucas won the bronze medal at the 2014 Men's Hockey World Cup and three medals at the Pan American Games. He was part of the Argentinian squad, which won the gold medal at the 2016 Summer Olympics. In 2018 he was selected for the 2018 World Cup which means he has played in four consecutive World Cups. He scored 1 goal in four matches in that tournament. In July 2019, he was selected in the Argentina squad for the 2019 Pan American Games. They won the gold medal by defeating Canada 5–2 in the final. In December 2019, he was nominated for the FIH Player of the Year Award. After the 2023 Men's FIH Hockey World Cup he retired from the national team.

== Club career ==
Vila started his career in Argentina at Banco Provincia. In the 2005–06 season he played for Harvestehude in the German Bundesliga. In 2007 he moved to the Netherlands to play for TMHC Tilburg, which he left in 2010 to play for HGC. He missed a big part of his first season at HGC because of a knee injury. After two seasons with HGC he went to Belgium to play for Royal Orée before coming back to the Netherlands after one year to play for HC Den Bosch. After one season with Den Bosch he went to Spain to play for Club de Campo. He left the club from Madrid also after one season to play for Real Club de Polo. With Real Club de Polo, he played in the Euro Hockey League. In 2017 Vila transferred to his current club Mannheimer HC in Germany. After three seasons in Mannheim he made a move to Leuven. On 20 August 2021, it was announced he would leave Belgium to play for Spanish second division side Benalmádena.

== Honours ==
=== Club ===
HGC

- Euro Hockey League: 2010–11

Real Club de Polo

- Copa del Rey: 2015–16, 2016–17

=== International ===
Argentina

- Summer Olympics: 2016
- Pan American Games: 2011, 2015, 2019
- Pan American Cup: 2013, 2017
- Champions Challenge: 2007
- South American Games: 2022
- South American Championship: 2013

Argentina U21

- Junior World Cup: 2005
- Pan American Junior Championship: 2005

=== Individual ===
- South American Championship leading goalscorer: 2013
- Junior World Cup Best player: 2005
