= Agustín Corradini =

Argentine field hockey player

Personal information
- Full name: Agustín Esteban Corradini
- Born: 31 July 1984 (age 42) Buenos Aires, Argentina

Sport
- Sport: Field hockey
- Club: Uccle Sport (Head coach)
Medal record
Men's field hockey
Representing Argentina
Champions Trophy
| Gold medal – first place | 2008 Rotterdam |
Pan American Cup
| Bronze medal – third place | 2009 Santiago |
South American Games
| Gold medal – first place | 2006 Buenos Aires | Team |
Junior World Cup
| Gold medal – first place | 2005 Rotterdam |
Pan American Junior Championship
| Gold medal – first place | 2005 Havana |

Agustín Esteban Corradini (born 31 July 1984) is an Argentine retired field hockey player. He was a member of the national team and in May 2017, after coaching the junior team to a gold medal at the 2016 Women's Hockey Junior World Cup, he was appointed head coach of the Argentina women's national field hockey team. He became the head coach of the Belgian club Léopold first men's team in the summer of 2021.
