= Argentina men's national under-21 field hockey team =

Argentina
- Nickname(s): Los Leoncitos (The Little Lions)
- Association: Argentine Hockey Confederation (Confederación Argentina de Hockey)
- Confederation: PAHF (Americas)
- Head Coach: Juan Ignacio Gilardi
- Assistant coach(es): Ignacio Ortiz
- Manager: Guido Barreiros
- Captain: Tomás Ruiz
Home	Away

FIH Hockey Junior World Cup
- Appearances: 13 (first in 1979)
- Best result: (gold) 1st (2005, 2021)

Pan American Junior Championship
- Appearances: 15 (first in 1978)
- Best result: 1st (1978, 1981, 1985, 1988, 1992, 1996, 2000, 2005, 2008, 2012, 2016, 2023, 2024, 2026)
Medal record
FIH Junior World Cup
Gold medal – first place	2005 Rotterdam
Gold medal – first place	2021 Bhubaneswar
Silver medal – second place	2001 Hobart
Pan American Junior Championship
Gold medal – first place	1978 Mexico City
Gold medal – first place	1981 Santiago
Gold medal – first place	1985 Orlando
Gold medal – first place	1988 Port of Spain
Gold medal – first place	1992 Havana
Gold medal – first place	1996 Bridgetown
Gold medal – first place	2000 Santiago
Gold medal – first place	2005 Havana
Gold medal – first place	2008 Port of Spain
Gold medal – first place	2012 Guadalajara
Gold medal – first place	2016 Toronto
Gold medal – first place	2023 St Michael
Gold medal – first place	2024 Surrey
Gold medal – first place	2026 Santiago
Silver medal – second place	2021 Santiago

The Argentina men's national under-21 field hockey team represents Argentina in men's international under-21 field hockey competitions and is controlled by the Argentine Hockey Confederation, the governing body for field hockey in Argentina.

The team competes in the Pan American Junior Championship which they have won a record 14 times. They have qualified for all Junior World Cups which they have won twice.

== Tournament record ==
=== Junior World Cup ===
Junior World Cup record
Year	Host	Round	Pos	Pld	W	D	L	GF	GA	Squad
1979	Versailles, France	Group stage	6th	7	4	0	3	13	18	
1982	Kuala Lumpur, Malaysia	Withdrew								
1985	Vancouver, Canada	Group stage	7th	8	3	2	3	23	16	
1989	Ipoh, Malaysia	Group stage	5th	7	4	1	2	16	15	
1993	Terrassa, Spain	Group stage	6th	7	3	1	3	10	14	
1997	Milton Keynes, England	Group stage	6th	7	3	2	2	17	16	
2001	Hobart, Australia	Final	2nd	8	5	1	2	20	14	
2005	Rotterdam, Netherlands	Final	1st	8	6	2	0	13	6	
2009	Johor Bahru, Malaysia; Singapore	Group stage	6th	8	4	0	4	24	18	
2013	New Delhi, India	Group stage	11th	5	2	0	3	11	13	
2016	Lucknow, India	Quarter-finals	5th	6	3	2	1	13	6	Squad
2021	Bhubaneswar, India	Final	1st	6	4	1	1	26	9	Squad
2023	Kuala Lumpur, Malaysia	7th	6	4	0	2	20	6	12	Squad
2025	Chennai and Madurai, India	4th	6	3	1	2	14	11	3	Squad
2027	TBD	Qualified								
Total		2 titles	12/13	83	44	13	26	200	156	

=== Junior Pan American Championship ===
Pan American Junior Championship
Year	Host city	Position
1978	Mexico City, Mexico	1st
1981	Santiago, Chile	1st
1985	Orlando, United States	1st
1988	Port of Spain, Trinidad and Tobago	1st
1992	Havana, Cuba	1st
1996	Bridgetown, Barbados	1st
2000	Santiago, Chile	1st
2005	Havana, Cuba	1st
2008	Port of Spain, Trinidad and Tobago	1st
2012	Guadalajara, Mexico	1st
2016	Toronto, Canada	1st
2021	Santiago, Chile	2nd
2023	Saint Michael, Barbados	1st
2024	Surrey, Canada	1st
2026	Santiago, Chile	1st

=== Junior Pan American Games ===
Junior Pan American Games
Year	Host city	Position
2025	Asunción, Paraguay	1st

== Current squad ==
The following 18 players were named on 29 October 2021 for the 2021 Men's FIH Hockey Junior World Cup in Bhubaneswar, India.

Caps updated as of 5 December 2021, after the match against Germany.

No.	Pos.	Player	Date of birth (age)	Caps	Club
1	GK	Nehuen Hernando	23 June 2000 (age 26)	6	(Argentina) Ducilo
12	GK	Agustín Cabaña	3 June 2000 (age 26)	1	(Argentina) Murialdo
2	DF	Facundo Zárate (Captain)	31 July 2000 (age 26)	6	(Argentina) Jockey Club Córdoba
3	DF	Bruno Stellato	17 January 2000 (age 26)	6	(Argentina) Ciudad de Buenos Aires
6	DF	Mateo Fernández	12 July 2002 (age 24)	6	(Argentina) Banco Provincia
8	DF	Lautaro Domene	24 July 2001 (age 25)	6	(Belgium) Ombrage
13	DF	Tadeo Mahon	21 January 2000 (age 26)	5	(Argentina) Banco Provincia
4	MF	Tadeo Marcucci	3 May 2001 (age 25)	6	(Argentina) Lomas
5	MF	Joaquín Krüger	29 May 2001 (age 25)	6	(Belgium) Daring
10	MF	Ignacio Ibarra	7 May 2000 (age 26)	6	(Argentina) Ducilo
11	MF	Joaquín Toscani	25 February 2002 (age 24)	6	(Argentina) Banco Provincia
14	MF	Ignacio Nardolillo	18 February 2003 (age 23)	6	(Argentina) San Martín de Tucumán
15	MF	Facundo Sarto	3 November 2000 (age 26)	6	(Argentina) Ciudad de Buenos Aires
7	FW	Franco Agostini	8 March 2000 (age 26)	6	(Argentina) Lomas
9	FW	Gaspar Garrone	1 August 2000 (age 26)	6	(Argentina) Jockey Club Córdoba
17	FW	Francisco Ruiz	10 October 2001 (age 25)	6	(Argentina) Mitre
18	FW	Lucio Mendez	20 August 2000 (age 26)	6	(Argentina) Lomas
20	FW	Bautista Capurro	22 October 2003 (age 23)	6	(Argentina) Ciudad de Buenos Aires

== Youth team ==
=== Tournament records ===
Youth Olympic Games
Year	Host city	Position
2010	Singapore	DNP
2014	Nanjing, China	DNP
2018	Buenos Aires, Argentina	3rd
2026	Dakar, Senegal	TBD

South American Youth Games
Year	Host city	Position
2022	Rosario, Argentina	1st

Pan American Youth Championship
Year	Host city	Position
2010	Montevideo, Uruguay	1st
2014	Montevideo, Uruguay	1st
2018	Guadalajara, Mexico	1st

=== Youth squad ===
The following players were listed on the roster for the 2022 events:

Head Coach: Juan Gilardi.

No.	Pos.	Player	Date of birth (age)	Caps	Club
1	GK	Joaquín Ruiz Saporiti	6 May 2004 (age 22) – Buenos Aires	5	(Argentina) Hockey Mitre
2		Simón Casiello	11 October 2005 (age 21) – Santa Fe	5	(Argentina) JCR
3		Jeremías Bralo	26 March 2005 (age 21) - Tucumán	5	(Argentina) Huirapuca
4		Cirilo Cipitelli	5 March 2004 (age 22) – (Buenos Aires Province)	5	(Argentina) Hurling
5		Nicolás Rodríguez	7 November 2005 (age 21) – Córdoba	5	(Argentina) CAC
6		Juan Fernández	24 July 2004 (age 22) – (Buenos Aires Province)	5	(Argentina) Santa Bárbara
7		Facundo Guerra (Captain)	9 April 2004 (age 22) – Buenos Aires	5	(Argentina) Muni
8		Thiago Zalazar	8 December 2004 (age 21) - Buenos Aires	5	(Argentina) SAG
9		Tomás Ruiz Saporiti	5 May 2004 (age 22) – Buenos Aires	5	(Argentina) Hockey Mitre

== See also ==
- Argentina women's national under-21 field hockey team
