= 2026 Men's Junior Pan American Cup =

Field hockey championship

Tournament details
- Host country: Chile
- City: Santiago
- Dates: 6–18 April
- Teams: 7 (from 1 confederation)
- Venue(s): Centro Deportivo de Hockey Césped, Estadio Nacional

Final positions
- Champions: Argentina (14th title)
- Runner-up: Canada
- Third place: Chile

Tournament statistics
- Matches played: 27
- Goals scored: 188 (6.96 per match)
- Top scorer: (Argentina) Nicolás Rodríguez (29 goals)
- Best player: (United States) Sekayi Charasika
- Best goalkeeper: (Canada) Morgan Garside

The 2026 Men's Junior Pan American Cup was the 15th edition of the Men's Junior Pan American Cup, the biennial men's international under-21 field hockey championship of the Americas, organised by the Pan American Hockey Federation. It was being held alongside the women's tournament from 6 to 18 April 2026 at the Centro Deportivo de Hockey Césped, Estadio Nacional in Santiago, Chile.

The tournament also served as a qualification for the 2027 Men's FIH Hockey Junior World Cup, with the top three teams qualifying. The two-time defending champions Argentina won a record-extending 14th title by defeating Canada 4–0 in the final. The hosts Chile won the bronze medal by defeating the United States 2–0.

== Teams ==
- Argentina
- Brazil
- Canada
- Chile
- Mexico
- United States
- Venezuela

== Preliminary round ==
All times are local (UTC−7)

=== Standings ===
Pos	Team	Pld	W	D	L	GF	GA	GD	Pts	Qualification
1	Argentina	6	6	0	0	66	2	+64	18	Semi-finals
2	Canada	6	5	0	1	33	12	+21	15	Semi-finals
3	United States	6	3	1	2	28	14	+14	10	Semi-finals
4	Chile (H)	6	3	1	2	21	8	+13	10	Semi-finals
5	Mexico	6	1	1	4	10	33	−23	4	
6	Venezuela	6	1	1	4	3	53	−50	4	
7	Brazil	6	0	0	6	1	40	−39	0	

Source: FIH
Rules for classification: 1) points; 2) matches won; 3) goal difference; 4) goals for; 5) head-to-head result; 6) field goals for.
(H) Hosts

=== Matches ===
6 April 2026
11:00

United States	12–0	Brazil
Charasika 2', 4', 11', 19', 45', 47', 48', 56', 57'; Grewal 19', 37', 49'	Report

Umpires:
Fabian Romero (PAR)
Eduardo Islas (MEX)

6 April 2026
13:00

Canada	12–0	Venezuela
Chandi 11', 16', 22'; Hundal 25'; R. Thind 26', 42', 49', 58', 59'; De Souza 28', 30'; Campbell 40'	Report

Umpires:
Gabriel Labate (ARG)
Brian Tyson (USA)

6 April 2026
19:00

Chile	2–0	Mexico
Wilhelmy 24'; Fariña 39'	Report

Umpires:
Pambavasan Manikandan (CAN)
Basilio Canale (ARG)

7 April 2026
14:00

Argentina	19–0	Venezuela
Fernández 5', 13', 32'; Rodríguez 7', 15', 30', 35', 37'; Costa 14', 45', 57'; Kovalivker 24'; Serrano 27', 33'; Casiello 29', 48'; Ballini 46'; Rivarola 52'; Barrena 57'	Report

Umpires:
Pedro Hernandez (CHI)
Eduardo Islas (MEX)

7 April 2026
16:00

Canada	8–4	Mexico
Yogeshwaran 10'; Campbell 10'; Chandi 17', 25', 29'; De Souza 33'; R. Thind 43', 46'	Report	Cuate 2', 42'; Vazquez 27'; Francis 54'

Umpires:
Manuel Sierra Centeno (VEN)
Basilio Canale (ARG)

7 April 2026
20:00

Chile	3–0	Brazil
Fosalba 1'; Richard 18'; Fariña 60'	Report

Umpires:
Gabriel Labate (ARG)
Fabian Romero (PAR)

9 April 2026
14:00

Argentina	16–0	Mexico
Costa 9'; Casiello 8', 37'; Fernández 12', 49', 54'; Serrano 21', 45'; Rodríguez 31', 34', 43', 51', 58'; Kovalivker 36', 52'; Barberis 45'	Report

Umpires:
Brian Tyson (USA)
Manuel Sierra Centeno (VEN)

9 April 2026
16:00

Canada	7–0	Brazil
R. Thind 7', 28', 32', 45'; Bhullar 15'; Chandi 29'; Campbell 56'	Report

Umpires:
Pedro Hernandez (CHI)
Gabriel Labate (ARG)

9 April 2026
20:00

Chile	2–2	United States
Duisberg 48'; Stein 58'	Report	Charasika 28', 56'

Umpires:
Pambavasan Manikandan (CAN)
Fabian Romero (PAR)

10 April 2026
13:00

Mexico	2–2	Venezuela
Cuate 28'; Santillan 39'	Report	Lopez 44'; Gómez 57'

Umpires:
Pambavasan Manikandan (CAN)
Brian Tyson (USA)

10 April 2026
15:00

Argentina	14–0	Brazil
Casiello 7', 37'; Rodríguez 15', 19', 34', 49', 54', 55'; Hanselmann 21'; Fernández 23'; Costa 34'; Somaini 37'; Dulor 39'; Orozco 48'	Report

Umpires:
Manuel Sierra Centeno (VEN)
Eduardo Islas (MEX)

10 April 2026
19:00

Canada	3–2	United States
Campbell 8'; Sandhu 15'; Hundal 54'	Report	Charasika 32'; Nobereit 45'

Umpires:
Gabriel Labate (ARG)
Basilio Canale (ARG)

12 April 2026
15:00

Brazil	1–3	Mexico
Larrubia 21'	Report	Santillan 5', 23'; Rodríguez 35'

Umpires:
Pambavasan Manikandan (CAN)
Manuel Sierra Centeno (VEN)

12 April 2026
17:00

United States	8–0	Venezuela
Charasika 14', 48', 51', 59'; Pouw 32'; Grewal 32'; Shindler 41'; Bleeker 54'	Report

Umpires:
Pedro Hernández (CHI)
Basilio Canale (ARG)

12 April 2026
19:00

Argentina	4–1	Chile
Fernández 5', 21'; Barrena 13'; Casiello 57'	Report	Wilhelmy 47'

Umpires:
Fabian Romero (PAR)
Brian Tyson (USA)

13 April 2026
16:00

Argentina	5–1	Canada
Kovalivker 16'; Rodríguez 31', 31'; Torrigiani 34'; Costa 59'	Report	Chandi 59'

Umpires:
Fabian Romero (PAR)
Brian Tyson (USA)

13 April 2026
18:00

Chile	12–0	Venezuela
Wilhelmy 24'; Fosalba 30', 33', 52', 57'; Fariña 39'; Hasson 43', 46'; Loehnert 50'; De Witt 55', 60'; Rodríguez 58'	Report

Umpires:
Macarena Dieni (ARG)
Gabriel Labate (ARG)

14 April 2026
13:00

United States	4–1	Mexico
Charasika 3', 49'; Grewal 27', 58'	Report	Santillan 47'

Umpires:
Pedro Hernandez (CHI)
Pambavasan Manikandan (CAN)

15 April 2026
15:00

Brazil	0–1	Venezuela
	Report	León 52'

Umpires:
Eduardo Islas (MEX)
Gabriel Labate (ARG)

15 April 2026
17:00

Argentina	8–0	United States
Rodríguez 6', 15+', 18', 21', 51'; Ballini 29'; Casiello 43'; Serrano 59'	Report

Umpires:
Fabian Romero (PAR)
Pambavasan Manikandan (CAN)

15 April 2026
19:00

Canada	2–1	Chile
De Souza 27', 54'	Report	Fosalba 37'

Umpires:
Brian Tyson (USA)
Basilio Canale (ARG)

== Fifth to seventh place classification ==
=== Bracket ===
Cross-over
17 April
Venezuela	2
Brazil	3

Fifth place
18 April
Mexico	2
Brazil	1

=== Cross-over ===
17 April 2026
10:00

Venezuela	2–3	Brazil
Lopez 29'; Salazar 50'	Report	Da Silva 8'; Figueira 57'; Martins 59'

Umpires:
Eduardo Islas (MEX)
Pambavasan Manikandan (CAN)

=== Fifth and sixth place ===
18 April 2026
08:00

Mexico	2–1	Brazil
Vazquez 28'; Ramírez 45'	Report	Figueira 57'

Umpires:
Manuel Sierra Centeno (VEN)
Pambavasan Manikandan (CAN)

== First to fourth place classification ==
=== Bracket ===
Semi-finals
17 April
Argentina	5
Chile	1
17 April
Canada (s.o.)	3 (4)
United States	3 (2)

Final
18 April
Argentina	4
Canada	0
Third place
18 April
Chile	2
United States	0

=== Semi-finals ===
17 April 2026
14:30

Argentina	5–1	Chile
Rodríguez 11', 26', 50', 51'; Casiello 53'	Report	Richard 9'

Umpires:
Fabian Romero (PAR)
Brian Tyson (USA)

17 April 2026
12:15

Canada	3–3	United States
Fitch 28'; De Souza 45'; Hundal 54'	Report	Charasika 31', 56'; Kim 32'
Penalties
R. Thind (penalty shoot-out scored); Chandi (penalty shoot-out scored); Bhullar (penalty shoot-out scored); Callewart (penalty shoot-out scored)	4–2	(penalty shoot-out missed) Shindler; (penalty shoot-out scored) Charasika; (penalty shoot-out missed) Grewal; (penalty shoot-out scored) Pouw

Umpires:
Basilio Canale (ARG)
Gabriel Labate (ARG)

=== Third and fourth place ===
18 April 2026
12:30

Chile	2–0	United States
Duisberg 19'; Fosalba 45'	Report

Umpires:
Basilio Canale (ARG)
Gabriel Labate (ARG)

=== Final ===
18 April 2026
17:00

Argentina	4–0	Canada
Rodríguez 25', 29'; Serrano 28', 57'	Report

Umpires:
Brian Tyson (USA)
Fabian Romero (PAR)

== Statistics ==
=== Final standings ===
Pos	Team	Qualification
1st place, gold medalist(s)	Argentina	2027 FIH Hockey Junior World Cup
2nd place, silver medalist(s)	Canada	2027 FIH Hockey Junior World Cup
3rd place, bronze medalist(s)	Chile (H)	2027 FIH Hockey Junior World Cup
4	United States	
5	Mexico	
6	Brazil	
7	Venezuela	

Source: FIH
(H) Host

=== Goalscorers ===
There were 188 goals scored in 27 matches, for an average of 6.96 goals per match.

29 goals

- (Argentina) Nicolás Rodríguez

20 goals

- (United States) Sekayi Charasika

11 goals

- (Canada) Robin Thind

9 goals

- (Argentina) Simon Casiello
- (Argentina) Santiago Fernández

8 goals

- (Canada) Navdip Chandi

7 goals

- (Argentina) Mateo Serrano
- (Chile) Gaspar Fosalba

6 goals

- (Argentina) Joaquín Costa
- (Canada) Leighton De Souza
- (United States) Mehtab Grewal

4 goals

- (Argentina) Yaco Kovalivker
- (Canada) Josiah Campbell
- (Mexico) Isidro Santillan

3 goals

- (Canada) Paramdev Hundal
- (Chile) Ignacio Fariña
- (Chile) Vicente Wilhelmy
- (Mexico) Jesahel Cuate

2 goals

- (Argentina) Tomas Ballini
- (Argentina) Teo Barrena
- (Brazil) Henrique Figueira
- (Chile) Rafael De Witt
- (Chile) Felipe Duisberg
- (Chile) Tomás Hasson
- (Chile) Felipé Richard
- (Mexico) Azriel Vazquez
- (Venezuela) Yeiver Lopez

1 goal

- (Argentina) Joaquín Barberis
- (Argentina) Luca Dulor
- (Argentina) Federico Hanselmann
- (Argentina) Juan Orozco
- (Argentina) Mateo Rivarola
- (Argentina) Lorenzo Somaini
- (Argentina) Mateo Torrigiani
- (Brazil) Henrique da Silva
- (Brazil) Rafael Larrubia
- (Brazil) Luiz Martins
- (Canada) Gurnoor Bhullar
- (Canada) Caleb Fitch
- (Canada) Karam Sandhu
- (Canada) Abiram Yogeshwaran
- (Chile) Sebastian Loehnert
- (Chile) Tomás Rodríguez
- (Chile) Axel Stein
- (Mexico) Erick Francis
- (Mexico) Óscar Ramírez
- (Mexico) Brandon Rodríguez
- (United States) Rory Bleeker
- (United States) Tyler Kim
- (United States) Bennet Nobereit
- (United States) Willem Pouw
- (United States) Oliver Shindler
- (Venezuela) Cristian Gómez
- (Venezuela) Jorge León
- (Venezuela) Rafael Salazar

Source: FIH

== See also ==
- 2026 Women's Junior Pan American Cup
