= 2008 Men's South American Hockey Championship =

Field hockey tournament

Tournament details
- Host country: Uruguay
- City: Montevideo
- Dates: 29 March – 6 April
- Teams: 7 (from 1 confederation)

Final positions
- Champions: Argentina (2nd title)
- Runner-up: Chile
- Third place: Uruguay

Tournament statistics
- Matches played: 111
- Goals scored: 21 (0.19 per match)
- Top scorer: (Argentina) Pascal Lineaux (12 goals)
- Best player: (Argentina) Walter Conna

The 2008 Men's South American Hockey Championship was the second edition of the Men's South American Hockey Championship, the South American championship for men's national field hockey teams, organized by the PAHF. It was held from 29 March to 6 April 2008 in Montevideo, Uruguay.

Argentina were the defending champions, having won the first edition. They won their second title in a row by finishing first in the round-robin tournament.

== Tournament ==
=== Pool ===
Pos	Team	Pld	W	D	L	GF	GA	GD	Pts
1st place, gold medalist(s)	Argentina (C)	6	6	0	0	41	1	+40	18
2nd place, silver medalist(s)	Chile	6	5	0	1	27	4	+23	15
3rd place, bronze medalist(s)	Uruguay (H)	6	3	0	3	13	12	+1	9
4	Brazil	6	3	0	3	10	16	−6	9
5	Peru	6	1	1	4	6	22	−16	4
6	Venezuela	6	1	1	4	5	29	−24	4
7	Paraguay	6	1	0	5	9	27	−18	3

Source: PAHF
(C) Champions; (H) Hosts

=== Results ===
29 March 2008
16:00

Chile	10–0	Venezuela
	Report

29 March 2008
18:00

Brazil	5–3	Paraguay
	Report

29 March 2008
20:00

Uruguay	4–0	Peru
	Report

30 March 2008
16:30

Chile	5–0	Brazil
	Report

30 March 2008
18:30

Paraguay	2–3	Peru
	Report

30 March 2008
20:30

Argentina	4–0	Uruguay
	Report

1 April 2008
10:00

Argentina	12–0	Venezuela
	Report

1 April 2008
12:00

Peru	1–2	Brazil
	Report

1 April 2008
14:00

Chile	4–0	Paraguay
	Report

2 April 2008
11:00

Brazil	1–2	Venezuela
	Report

2 April 2008
13:00

Argentina	8–0	Peru
	Report

2 April 2008
21:00

Chile	3–1	Uruguay
	Report

3 April 2008
11:00

Venezuela	2–2	Peru
	Report

3 April 2008
13:00

Argentina	4–0	Brazil
	Report

3 April 2008
19:00

Uruguay	5–2	Paraguay
	Report

5 April 2008
08:00

Chile	4–0	Peru
	Report

5 April 2008
12:00

Uruguay	2–1	Venezuela
	Report

5 April 2008
16:00

Argentina	10–0	Paraguay
	Report

6 April 2008
10:30

Uruguay	1–2	Brazil
	Report

6 April 2008
15:00

Venezuela	0–2	Paraguay
	Report

6 April 2008
19:30

Argentina	3–1	Chile
	Report
