= Facundo Callioni =

Argentine field hockey player

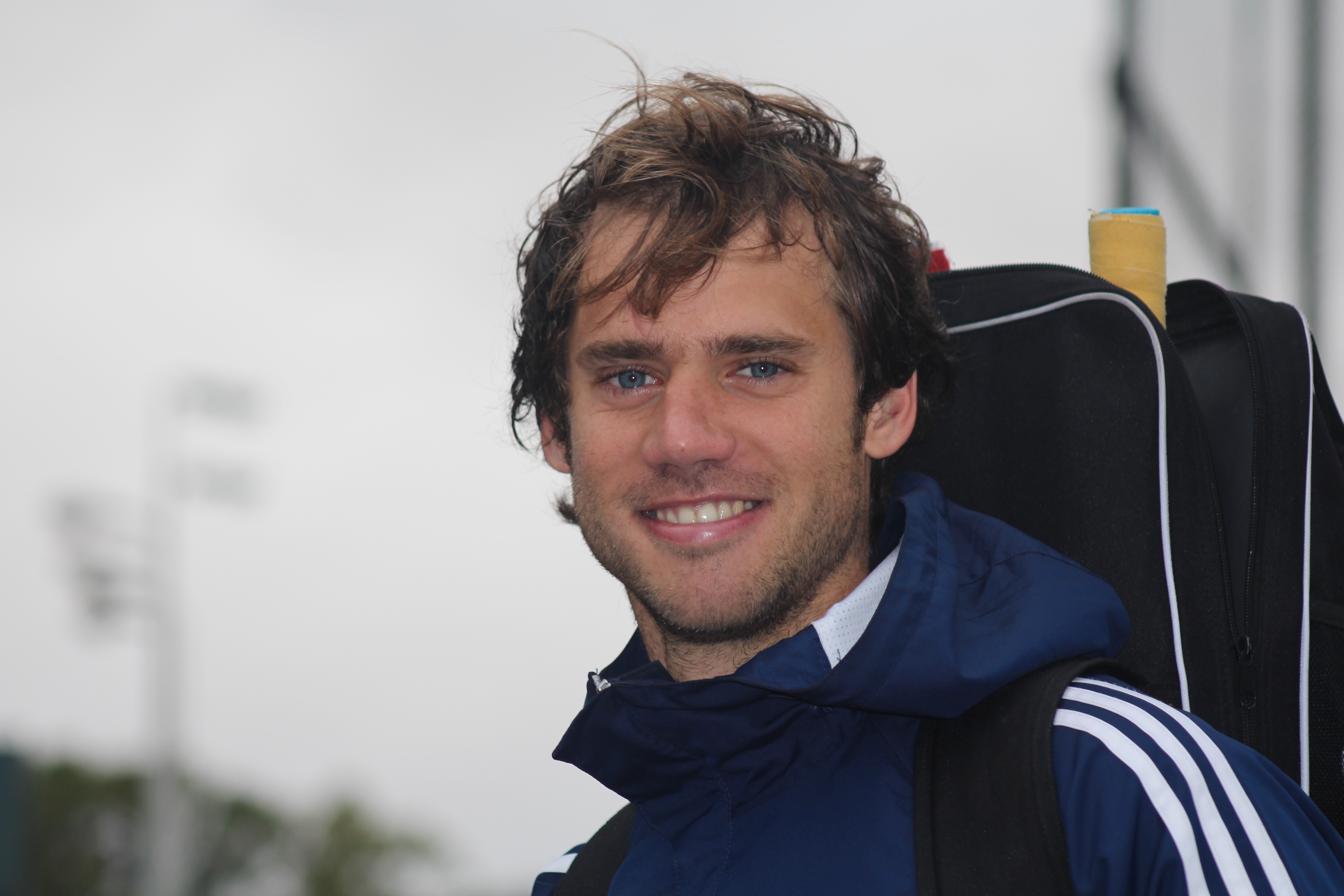

Personal information
- Born: 9 October 1985 (age 40) Buenos Aires, Argentina
- Height: 1.83 m (6 ft 0 in)
- Weight: 77 kg (170 lb)

Sport
- Sport: Field hockey
- Position: Forward
Youth career
- Team
- –: Ciudad
Senior career
Years	Team	Caps	Goals
–2008	Ciudad	-	-
2008–2010	Orée	-	-
2010–2011	?	-	-
2011–2013	Antwerp	-	-
2013–2021	Orée	-	-
National team
Years	Team	Caps	Goals
–	Argentina		-
Medal record
Olympic Games
Gold medal – first place	2016 Rio de Janeiro	Team
Pan American Games
Gold medal – first place	2015 Toronto	Team
Pan American Cup
Gold medal – first place	2013 Brampton
Bronze medal – third place	2009 Santiago
Champions Trophy
Bronze medal – third place	2008 Rotterdam
Junior World Cup
Gold medal – first place	2005 Rotterdam
Pan American Junior Championship
Gold medal – first place	2005 Havana
- Updated on 11 May 2021

Facundo Callioni (born 9 October 1985) is an Argentine field hockey player. At the 2012 Summer Olympics, he competed for the national team in the men's tournament. Facundo won the bronze medal at the 2014 Men's Hockey World Cup and the gold medal at the 2015 Pan American Games, in Toronto, Ontario, Canada.

He won a gold medal in the 2016 Summer Olympics in Rio de Janeiro, where the Argentina men's national field hockey team defeated Belgium 4–2 in the final match.

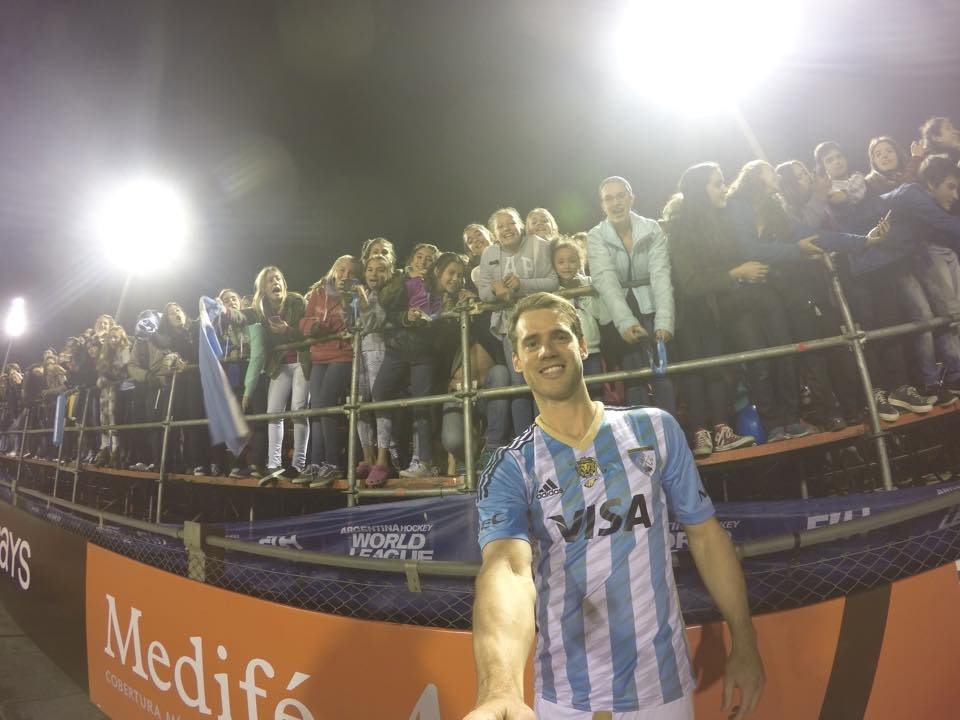
Facundo Callioni #HWL2015 en BsAs
