= Santiago Montelli =

Argentine field hockey player (born 1988)

Personal information
- Full name: Santiago Miguel Montelli
- Born: 3 May 1988 (age 38) Adrogué, Argentina
- Height: 1.65 m (5 ft 5 in)
- Weight: 71 kg (157 lb)

Sport
- Sport: Field hockey
- Position: Forward
- Club: Daring
Senior career
Years	Team	Caps	Goals
–2010	Lomas	-	-
2010–2011	Waterloo Ducks	-	-
2011–2014	Lomas	-	-
2014–2016	Taburiente	-	-
2016–2017	Lomas	-	-
2017–2019	Tenis	-	-
2019–2020	Leuven	-	-
2020–2021	Linia 22	-	-
2021–present	Daring	-	-
National team
Years	Team	Caps	Goals
–2014	Argentina		-
Medal record
Men's field hockey
Representing Argentina
South American Championship
Gold medal – first place	2013 Santiago
- Updated on 5 April 2022

Santiago Miguel Montelli (born 3 May 1988) is an Argentine field hockey player who plays as a forward for Belgian Hockey League club Royal Daring.

At the 2012 Summer Olympics, he competed for the national team in the men's tournament.

== Club career ==
Montelli played in Argentina for Lomas. On 7 July 2010, it was announced he would join the Waterloo Ducks in the Belgian Hockey League for the 2010–11 season. He left the Waterloo Ducks after one season. From 2014 until 2016 he played for Taburiente in Spain. In 2017 he returned to Spain to play for Tenis. He left Tenis in 2019 to play for Leuven in Belgium. After one season at Leuven he returned for one year to Spain to play for Linia 22. In 2021 he returned to Belgium and joined Royal Daring.
