= Juan Manuel Saladino =

Argentine field hockey player

Juan Saladino
Personal information
- Nationality: Argentine
- Born: 28 September 1987 (age 38)
- Height: 1.74 m (5 ft 9 in)
- Weight: 73 kg (161 lb)

Sport
- Country: Argentina
- Sport: Field hockey
Medal record
Olympic Games
Gold medal – first place	2016 Rio de Janeiro	Team

Juan Manuel Saladino (born 28 September 1987) is an Argentine field hockey player. He represented his country at the 2016 Summer Olympics, where he won the gold medal.
