= 2003 Men's South American Hockey Championship =

Tournament details
- Host country: Chile
- City: Santiago
- Dates: 16–23 March
- Teams: 6 (from 1 confederation)

Final positions
- Champions: Argentina (1st title)
- Runner-up: Chile
- Third place: Peru

Tournament statistics
- Matches played: 15
- Goals scored: 162 (10.8 per match)

The 2003 Men's South American Hockey Championship was the first edition of the Men's South American Hockey Championship, the South American championship for men's national field hockey teams, organized by the PAHF. It was held from 16 until 23 March 2003 in Santiago, Chile.

Argentina won the first edition by finishing first in the round-robin tournament. As winners, Argentina qualified for the 2003 Pan American Games in Santo Domingo, Dominican Republic.

== Tournament ==
=== Pool ===
| Pos | Team | Pld | W | D | L | GF | GA | GD | Pts | Qualification |
|---|---|---|---|---|---|---|---|---|---|---|
| 1st place, gold medalist(s) | Argentina (C) | 5 | 5 | 0 | 0 | 71 | 4 | +67 | 15 | 2003 Pan American Games |
| 2nd place, silver medalist(s) | Chile (H) | 5 | 4 | 0 | 1 | 62 | 3 | +59 | 12 | |
| 3rd place, bronze medalist(s) | Peru | 5 | 2 | 1 | 2 | 11 | 28 | −17 | 7 | |
| 4 | Uruguay | 5 | 2 | 1 | 2 | 8 | 26 | −18 | 7 | |
| 5 | Brazil | 5 | 1 | 0 | 4 | 7 | 41 | −34 | 3 | |
| 6 | Paraguay | 5 | 0 | 0 | 5 | 3 | 60 | −57 | 0 | |

Source: PAHF
(C) Champions; (H) Hosts

=== Results ===
All times are local, CLST (UTC-3).

16 March 2003
08:00

| Uruguay | 2–0 | Paraguay |

16 March 2003
10:00

| Brazil | 1–17 | Argentina |

16 March 2003
12:00

| Chile | 12–0 | Peru |

17 March 2003
10:00

| Argentina | 13–0 | Peru |

17 March 2003
12:00

| Brazil | 2–3 | Uruguay |

18 March 2003
17:00

| Paraguay | 0–21 | Chile |

19 March 2003
08:00

| Peru | 1–0 | Brazil |

19 March 2003
12:00

| Uruguay | 1–13 | Argentina |

20 March 2003
10:00

| Chile | 9–0 | Uruguay |

20 March 2003
12:00

| Paraguay | 2–4 | Brazil |

21 March 2003
17:00

| Argentina | 25–0 | Paraguay |

22 March 2003
10:00

| Uruguay | 2–2 | Peru |

22 March 2003
17:00

| Brazil | 0–18 | Chile |

23 March 2003
08:00

| Paraguay | 1–8 | Peru |

23 March 2003
17:00

| Chile | 2–3 | Argentina |
