= Club Atlético Ducilo =

Ducilo
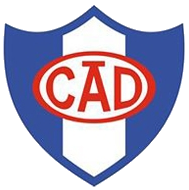
- Full name: Club Atlético Ducilo
- Nickname(s): Tricolor
- League: Metropolitano
- Founded: November 18, 1938; 87 years ago
- Home ground: 151 and 5 streets, Berazategui

Personnel
- Chairman: Pablo "Tierno" Moreira
Home

Club Atlético Ducilo is a sports club based in Berazategui, Greater Buenos Aires. The club is mostly known for its field hockey teams, with the women's squad currently participating of the Metropolitano championship organised by the Buenos Aires Hockey Association.

Apart from hockey, other sports practised at the club are rugby union and football.

== History ==
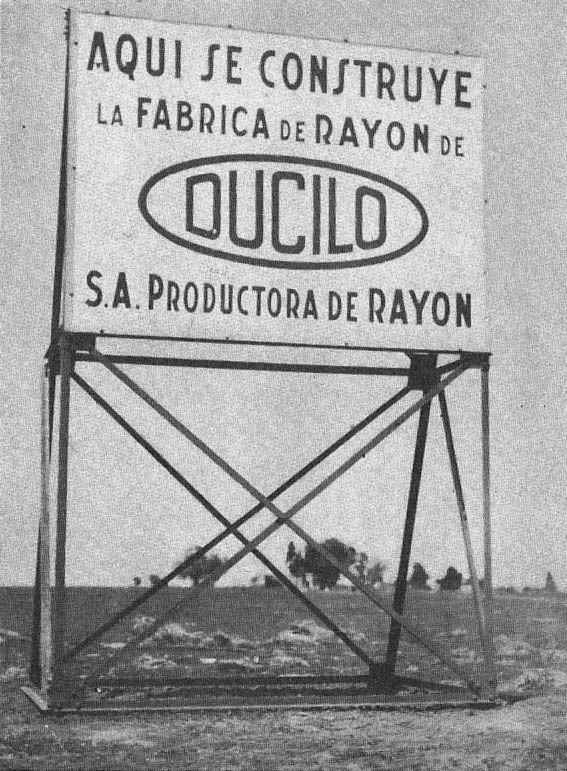
Signage announcing the construction of the Ducilo industrial plant in Berazategui, c. 1935.

The DuPont textile manufacturing company opened its first industrial plant in Argentina in 1937, after acquiring a farm to the Stanfield family of Berazategui. As the plant would produce threads ("hilo" in Spanish) the company thought of a name related. After rejecting some ideas (like "Duhilo"), finally the name "Ducilo" was adopted to start the company's activities in the country.

One year later, the company founded "Club Atlético Ducilo", a sports club for its employees and relatives exclusively, although the club would expand its rules of admission through the years.

Ducilo affiliated to the Hockey Association of Buenos Aires in 1962.

In 2007, the Municipality of Berazategui took over the club's headquarters.

In 2015, the Municipality expanded the Ducilo's facilities, adding two rugby union and two football fields.
