= 2010 Men's South American Hockey Championship =

Field hockey tournament

2010 Men's South American Championship
Tournament details
- Host country: Brazil
- City: Rio de Janeiro
- Dates: 3–11 April
- Teams: 6 (from 1 confederation)

Final positions
- Champions: Argentina (3rd title)
- Runner-up: Chile
- Third place: Uruguay

Tournament statistics
- Matches played: 18
- Goals scored: 131 (7.28 per match)
- Top scorer: (Chile) Alexis Berczely (12 goals)
- Best player: (Chile) Esteban Krainz

The 2010 Men's South American Hockey Championship was the third edition of the Men's South American Hockey Championship, the South American championship for men's national field hockey teams, organized by the PAHF. It was held from 3 to 11 April 2010 in Rio de Janeiro, Brazil.

The finalists, Argentina and Chile qualified for the 2011 Pan American Games. Argentina, the defending champions, won their third title in a row by defeating Chile 3–0 in the final.

== Results ==
=== Pool ===
Pos	Team	Pld	W	D	L	GF	GA	GD	Pts	Qualification
1	Argentina	5	5	0	0	53	1	+52	15	Final
2	Chile	5	4	0	1	35	7	+28	12	Final
3	Uruguay	5	3	0	2	11	16	−5	9	Third place game
4	Brazil (H)	5	2	0	3	10	22	−12	6	Third place game
5	Venezuela	5	1	0	4	4	32	−28	3	Fifth place game
6	Paraguay	5	0	0	5	3	38	−35	0	Fifth place game

Source: PAHF
(H) Hosts

3 April 2010
07:30

Chile	13–0	Paraguay
	Report

3 April 2010
11:00

Uruguay	5–0	Venezuela
	Report

3 April 2010
14:30

Brazil	0–12	Argentina
	Report

4 April 2010
07:30

Chile	6–1	Uruguay
	Report

4 April 2010
11:00

Argentina	15–1	Venezuela
	Report

4 April 2010
14:30

Paraguay	0–5	Brazil
	Report

7 April 2010
09:15

Argentina	14–0	Paraguay
	Report

7 April 2010
12:45

Chile	8–0	Venezuela
	Report

7 April 2010
16:15

Brazil	0–2	Uruguay
	Report

8 April 2010
09:15

Argentina	4–0	Chile
	Report

8 April 2010
12:45

Uruguay	3–2	Paraguay
	Report

8 April 2010
16:15

Venezuela	0–3	Brazil
	Report

9 April 2010
09:15

Argentina	8–0	Uruguay
	Report

9 April 2010
12:45

Venezuela	3–1	Paraguay
	Report

9 April 2010
16:15

Brazil	2–8	Chile
	Report

=== Classification ===
==== Fifth and sixth place ====
11 April 2010
09:30

Venezuela	7–4	Paraguay
	Report

==== Third and fourth place ====
11 April 2010
12:00

Uruguay	1–0 (a.e.t.)	Brazil
	Report

==== Final ====
11 April 2010
14:30

Argentina	3–0	Chile
	Report

== Statistics ==
=== Final standings ===
Rank	Team
Gold medal	Argentina
Silver medal	Chile
Bronze medal	Uruguay
4	Brazil
5	Venezuela
6	Paraguay

Qualified for the 2011 Pan American Games

=== Awards ===
The following awards were given at the conclusion of the tournament.

Best Player	Best Goalkeeper	Top Scorer	Fair Play
(Chile) Esteban Krainz	(Brazil) Daniel Tatara	(Chile) Alexis Berczely (12 goals)	Argentina
