= Men's South American Hockey Championship =

Field hockey tournament

- Most recent season or competition: 2016 Men's South American Hockey Championship
- Sport: Field hockey
- Most recent champion: Chile (1st title)
- Most titles: Argentina (4 titles)
- Related competitions: South American Games

The Men's South American Hockey Championship is together with the field hockey event at the South American Games the official competition for senior men's national field hockey teams of South America. The tournament is held every four years and every two years when there is no field hockey at the South American Games. In 2016 the tournament also was a 2016–17 Men's FIH Hockey World League Round 1 event.

== Results ==
=== Summaries ===
Year	Host	Final			Third place match			Number of teams
Year	Host	Winner	Score	Runner-up	Third place	Score	Fourth place	Number of teams
2003; Details	Santiago, Chile	Argentina	Round-robin	Chile	Peru	Round-robin	Uruguay	6
2008; Details	Montevideo, Uruguay	Argentina	Round-robin	Chile	Uruguay	Round-robin	Brazil	7
2010; Details	Rio de Janeiro, Brazil	Argentina	3–0	Chile	Uruguay	1–0 (a.e.t.)	Brazil	6
2013; Details	Santiago, Chile	Argentina	4–3	Chile	Brazil	4–1	Peru	6
2016; Details	Chiclayo, Peru	Chile	Round-robin	Venezuela	Uruguay	Round-robin	Paraguay	6
2021	Lima, Peru	Cancelled			Cancelled			–

=== Top four statistics ===
Team	Winners	Runners-up	Third place	Fourth place
Argentina	4 (2003, 2008, 2010, 2013)			
Chile	1 (2016)	4 (2003*, 2008, 2010, 2013*)		
Venezuela		1 (2016)		
Uruguay			3 (2008*, 2010, 2016)	1 (2003)
Brazil			1 (2013)	2 (2008, 2010*)
Peru			1 (2003)	1 (2013)
Paraguay				1 (2016)

* = host nation

=== Team appearances ===
Nation	(Chile) 2003	(Uruguay) 2008	(Brazil) 2010	(Chile) 2013	(Peru) 2016	Total
Argentina	1st	1st	1st	1st	–	4
Brazil	5th	4th	4th	3rd	–	4
Chile	2nd	2nd	2nd	2nd	1st	5
Ecuador	–	–	–	–	6th	1
Paraguay	6th	7th	6th	6th	4th	5
Peru	3rd	5th	–	4th	5th	5
Uruguay	4th	3rd	3rd	5th	3rd	5
Venezuela	–	6th	5th	–	2nd	3
Total	6	7	6	6	6	Source

== See also ==
- Women's South American Hockey Championship
- Field hockey at the South American Games
