= Men's Junior Pan American Cup =

International field hockey tournament

- Most recent season or competition: 2026 Men's Junior Pan American Cup
- Formerly: Junior Pan American Championship
- Sport: Field hockey
- Founded: 1978; 48 years ago
- First season: 1978
- No. of teams: 7
- Confederation: PAHF (Americas)
- Most recent champion: Argentina (14th title) (2026)
- Most titles: Argentina (14 titles)

The Men's Pan American Junior Cup is a men's international under-21 field hockey tournament organized by the Pan American Hockey Federation. The tournament has been held since 1978 and serves as a qualification tournament for the Junior World Cup.

Argentina has won every single tournament until 2021, when Chile became the first other nation to win the tournament.

== Results ==
Year	Host	Final			Third place match			Number of teams
Year	Host	Winner	Score	Runner-up	Third place	Score	Fourth place	Number of teams
1978	Mexico City, Mexico	Argentina		Chile	Canada		Mexico	6
1981	Santiago, Chile	Argentina		Canada	Chile		United States	6
1985	Orlando, United States	Argentina		Canada	Chile		Chile	6
1988	Port of Spain, Trinidad and Tobago	Argentina		Cuba	Canada		Chile	6
1992	Havana, Cuba	Argentina		Cuba	Canada		United States	6
1996	Bridgetown, Barbados	Argentina	2–1	Cuba	Canada	8–1	Chile	10
2000	Santiago, Chile	Argentina	1–0	Chile	Canada	4–1	United States	10
2005; Details	Havana, Cuba	Argentina	7–0	Chile	Mexico	4–0	United States	11
2008; Details	Port of Spain, Trinidad and Tobago	Argentina	3–0	Chile	United States	2–2 (a.e.t.) (7–6 p.s.)	Canada	11
2012; Details	Guadalajara, Mexico	Argentina	3–2	Canada	Chile	3–2 (a.e.t.)	United States	13
2016; Details	Toronto, Canada	Argentina	5–0	Canada	Chile	4–1	United States	8
2021; Details	Santiago, Chile	Chile	1–1 (3–2 s.o.)	Argentina	United States	1–1 (4–3 s.o.)	Canada	7
2023; Details	Bridgetown, Barbados	Argentina	6–1	Canada	Chile	4–1	United States	7
2024; Details	Surrey, Canada	Argentina	10–0	Canada	Chile	1–1 (3–2 s.o.)	United States	6
2026; Details	Santiago, Chile	Argentina	4–0	Canada	Chile	2–0	United States	7

=== Successful national teams ===
Team	Titles	Runners-up	Third places	Fourth places
Argentina	14 (1978, 1981, 1985, 1988, 1992, 1996, 2000, 2005, 2008, 2012, 2016, 2023, 2024, 2026)	1 (2021)		
Chile	1 (2021*)	4 (1978, 2000*, 2005, 2008)	7 (1981*, 1985, 2012, 2016, 2023, 2024, 2026*)	2 (1988, 1996)
Canada		7 (1981, 1985, 2012, 2016*, 2023, 2024*, 2026)	5 (1978, 1988, 1992, 1996, 2000)	2 (2008, 2021)
Cuba		3 (1988, 1992*, 1996)		
United States			2 (2008, 2021)	10 (1981, 1985*, 1992, 2000, 2005, 2012, 2016, 2023, 2024, 2026)
Mexico			1 (2005)	1 (1978*)

* = host nation

=== Team appearances ===
Team	(Mexico) 1978	(Chile) 1981	(United States) 1985	(Trinidad and Tobago) 1988	(Cuba) 1992	(Barbados) 1996	(Chile) 2000	(Cuba) 2005	(Trinidad and Tobago) 2008	(Mexico) 2012	(Canada) 2016	(Chile) 2021	(Barbados) 2023	(Canada) 2024	(Chile) 2026	Total
Argentina	1st	1st	1st	1st	1st	1st	1st	1st	1st	1st	1st	2nd	1st	1st	1st	15
Barbados	–	–	–	–	–	7th	5th	7th	6th	7th	–	–	7th	–	–	6
Brazil	–	–	–	–	–	–	–	–	9th	9th	–	7th	6th	6th	6th	5
Canada	3rd	2nd	2nd	3rd	3rd	3rd	3rd	5th	4th	2nd	2nd	4th	2nd	2nd	2nd	15
Chile	2nd	3rd	3rd	4th	5th	4th	2nd	2nd	2nd	3rd	3rd	1st	3rd	3rd	3rd	15
Cuba	5th	–	–	2nd	2nd	2nd	–	6th	–	–	–	–	–	–	–	5
Guatemala	–	–	–	–	–	–	–	–	–	13th	–	–	–	–	–	1
Guyana	–	–	–	6th	–	10th	–	–	11th	–	7th	–	5th	–	–	5
Jamaica	6th	–	–	–	–	–	–	9th	10th	11th	–	–	–	–	–	4
Mexico	4th	5th	6th	–	6th	5th	6th	3rd	5th	6th	6th	5th	–	5th	5th	12
Paraguay	–	–	–	–	–	–	9th	–	–	–	–	–	–	–	–	1
Puerto Rico	–	–	–	–	–	–	10th	10th	8th	12th	8th	–	–	–	–	5
Trinidad and Tobago	–	6th	5th	–	–	6th	7th	8th	7th	5th	5th	6th	–	–	–	9
United States	–	4th	4th	5th	4th	9th	4th	4th	3rd	4th	4th	3rd	4th	4th	4th	13
Uruguay	–	–	–	–	–	–	–	–	–	8th	–	–	–	–	–	1
Venezuela	–	–	–	–	–	8th	8th	11th	–	10th	–	–	–	–	7th	4
Total	6	6	6	6	6	10	10	11	11	13	8	7	7	6	7	

== See also ==
- Men's Pan American Cup
- Women's Pan American Junior Championship
