= Argentina men's national field hockey squad records =

The Argentina men's national field hockey squad records are the results for men's international field hockey competitions. The sport is controlled by the Argentine Hockey Confederation, the governing body for field hockey in Argentina.

== Senior squad ==
Technical Staff:

- Head Coach: Mariano Ronconi
- Team Manager: Martín Elli
- Assistant Coaches: Ezequiel Paulón and Matías Vila
- Medical Doctor: Javier Blanco, Mauricio Ciladi, Luciano Mizdraji, Marcelo Montrasi and Juan Paunovich
- Physiotherapist: Mariano Arias, Francisco Ferrario and Sergio Lemos
- Physical Trainer: Leonardo Romagnoli
- Video Technitian: Lucas Peña
- Team captain: Matías Rey

=== 2023 squad ===
Players, caps and goals updated as of 7 May 2023.

No.	Pos.	Player	Date of birth (age)	Caps	Goals	Club
1	GK	Tomás Santiago	15 June 1992 (age 34)	52		(Royal Belgian Football Association) Gantoise
32	GK	Emiliano Bosso	3 December 1995 (age 30)	15		(Argentine Football Association) GEBA
24	GK	Nehuén Hernando	23 June 2000 (age 26)	11		(Argentine Football Association) Ducilo
17	DF	Santiago Tarazona	31 May 1996 (age 30)	102	9	(Royal Spanish Football Federation) Real Club de Polo
16	DF	Nicolás Cicileo	1 October 1993 (age 33)	93	0	(Royal Belgian Football Association) Daring
14	DF	Nicolás della Torre	1 March 1990 (age 36)	77	37	(Royal Belgian Football Association) Dragons
4	DF	Juan Catán	5 October 1995 (age 31)	55	7	(Royal Spanish Football Federation) Junior
18	DF	Federico Monja	12 September 1993 (age 33)	54	2	(Royal Belgian Football Association) Léopold
5	DF	Facundo Zárate	31 July 2000 (age 26)	21	0	(Argentine Football Association) Jockey (Córdoba)
2	DF	Agustín Machelett	31 January 1995 (age 31)	15	0	(Royal Spanish Football Federation) Tenis
63	DF	Lautaro Ferrero	20 May 1999 (age 27)	12	11	(Argentine Football Association) San Fernando
22	MF	Matías Rey	1 December 1984 (age 41)	263	13	(Argentine Football Association) San Fernando
30	MF	Agustín Bugallo	23 April 1995 (age 31)	114	6	(Royal Belgian Football Association) Gantoise
29	MF	Thomas Habif	27 May 1996 (age 30)	51	1	(German Football Association) Harvestehuder THC
25	MF	Nicolás Acosta	7 July 1996 (age 30)	29	5	(German Football Association) Crefelder HTC
20	MF	Ladislao Gencarelli	27 June 1997 (age 29)	16	0	(Royal Dutch Football Association) Tilburg
34	MF	Tobías Martins	14 July 1998 (age 28)	15	10	(Argentine Football Association) Ducilo
8	MF	Ignacio Nepote	30 June 1997 (age 29)	14	0	(Royal Belgian Football Association) Herakles
27	MF	Tadeo Marcucci	3 May 2001 (age 25)	10	0	(Argentine Football Association) Lomas
26	FW	Agustín Mazzilli	20 June 1989 (age 37)	247	43	(Royal Belgian Football Association) Braxgata
9	FW	Maico Casella	6 May 1997 (age 29)	111	55	(Argentine Football Association) San Fernando
23	FW	Lucas Martínez	17 November 1993 (age 33)	106	30	(Royal Belgian Football Association) Dragons
10	FW	Martín Ferreiro	21 October 1997 (age 29)	85	37	(Royal Belgian Football Association) Gantoise
7	FW	Nicolás Keenan	6 May 1997 (age 29)	58	12	(Royal Dutch Football Association) Klein Zwitserland
21	FW	Tomás Domene	4 September 1997 (age 29)	52	13	(Royal Belgian Football Association) Orée
11	FW	Lucas Toscani	22 November 1999 (age 26)	38	6	(German Football Association) Uhlenhorst Mülheim
31	FW	Bautista Capurro	22 October 2003 (age 23)	18	7	(Argentine Football Association) Ciudad de Buenos Aires
^{INA} Inactive^{INJ} Injured^{INV} Invitational

=== Changes from 2022 call-ups ===
Changes from last year call-ups and throughout the current year. Caps and goals updated as of 7 May 2023

Pos.	Player	Date of birth (age)	Caps	Goals	Club	Latest call-up
GK	Gaspar Dubarry ▼	18 June 2002 (age 24)	0		(Argentina) Banco Provincia	Never played an official match
DF	Leandro Tolini ▼	14 March 1990 (age 36)	87	38	(Netherlands) Tilburg	30 January 2022, v. Chile
MF	Nahuel Salis ▼	6 August 1989 (age 37)	87	5	(Belgium) Daring	1 August 2021, v. Germany
MF	Federico Fernández ▼	28 February 1992 (age 34)	62	5	(Netherlands) Tilburg	2 March 2023, v. Spain
MF	Diego Paz ▼	10 August 1992 (age 34)	55	1	(France) Lille	30 January 2022, v. Chile
MF	Facundo Sarto ▼	3 November 2000 (age 26)	9	2	(Argentina) Ciudad de Buenos Aires	5 March 2023, v. Spain
MF	Joaquín Puglisi ▼	23 October 1995 (age 31)	7	0	(Spain) Club de Campo	2 July 2022, v. Netherlands
MF	Joaquín Coelho ▼	2 June 1992 (age 34)	6	0	(Belgium) Daring	24 April 2022, v. South Africa
MF	Ignacio Ibarra ▼	7 May 2000 (age 26)	4	6	(Argentina) Ducilo	11 October 2022, v. Chile
MF	Joaquín Toscani ▼	25 February 2002 (age 24)	0	0	(Argentina) Banco Provincia	Never played an official match
FW	Lucas Vila ▼ ^{RETIRED IN FEBRUARY}	23 August 1986 (age 40)	274	97	(Germany) Mannheimer HC	23 January 2023, v. South Korea
FW	Santiago Binaghi ▼	6 March 1999 (age 27)	2	0	(Argentina) GEBA	17 April 2022, v. France
FW	Tobías Silvetti ▼	27 October 1998 (age 28)	2	0	(Argentina) Mitre	17 April 2022, v. France
FW	Franco Agostini ▼	8 March 2000 (age 26)	1	1	(Argentina) Lomas	24 April 2022, v. South Africa
FW	Gaspar Garrone ▼	1 August 2000 (age 26)	0		(Argentina) Universitario de Córdoba	Never played an official match

== Annual results ==
2020

25 January 2020 Test match	Chile	1–4	Argentina	Santiago, Chile
18:30 CLST (UTC−3)	Becerra 35'	Report	Ferreiro 24'; Casella 45'; Mazzilli 47'; Domene 52'	Stadium: Club Sport Francés

26 January 2020 Test match	Argentina	4–2	Canada	Santiago, Chile
17:30 CLST (UTC−3)	Tolini 21', 29', 53'; Ibarra 43'	Report	Pereira 13'; Johnston 60+'	Stadium: Prince of Wales Country Club

28 January 2020 Test match	Chile	1–4	Argentina	Santiago, Chile
20:00 CLST (UTC−3)	Pizarro 16'	Report	Vila 10', 17'; Ferreiro 14'; Tolini 47'	Stadium: Club Manquehue

29 January 2020 Test match	Argentina	4–1	Canada	Santiago, Chile
11:30 CLST (UTC−3)	Martínez 19'; Fernández 28'; Tolini 37', 60'	Report	Johnston 12'	Stadium: Prince of Wales Country Club

7 February 2020 2020 FIH Pro League	Argentina	3–4	Spain	Buenos Aires, Argentina
20:30 ART (UTC−3)	Casella 5', 26'; Tolini 41'	Report	Iglesias 13'; Quemada 29', 59'; Ruiz 55'	Stadium: CeNARD

8 February 2020 2020 FIH Pro League	Argentina	5–1	Spain	Buenos Aires, Argentina
20:30 ART (UTC−3)	Ferreiro 9'; Vila 32'; Tolini 38'; Martínez 42', 46'	Report	Quemada 22'	Stadium: CeNARD

15 February 2020 2020 FIH Pro League	Argentina	2–2 (1–3 p)	Netherlands	Buenos Aires, Argentina
18:00 ART (UTC−3)	Martínez 12'; Tolini 51'	Report	Pruyser 5'; Bakker 12'	Stadium: CeNARD
	Penalties
	Keenan (penalty shoot-out missed); Domene (penalty shoot-out scored); Ferreiro (penalty shoot-out missed); Mazzilli (penalty shoot-out missed)		(penalty shoot-out scored) Hertzberger; (penalty shoot-out scored) Schuurman; (penalty shoot-out scored) De Geus

16 February 2020 2020 FIH Pro League	Argentina	2–2 (3–4 p)	Netherlands	Buenos Aires, Argentina
18:00 ART (UTC−3)	Vila 3'; Mazzilli 21'	Report	Pruyser 30'; Kemperman 56'	Stadium: CeNARD
	Penalties
	Ortiz (penalty shoot-out scored); Vila (penalty shoot-out scored); Rey (penalty shoot-out missed); Martínez (penalty shoot-out missed); Mazzilli (penalty shoot-out missed)		(penalty shoot-out scored) Hertzberger; (penalty shoot-out scored) Van Ass; (penalty shoot-out missed) De Geus; (penalty shoot-out scored) Van Dam; (penalty shoot-out scored) Pruyser

28 February 2020 2020 FIH Pro League	New Zealand	5–3	Argentina	Christchurch, New Zealand
17:30 NZDT (UTC+13)	Lane 5'; Thomas 32'; J. Panchia 48'; Bennett 51'; Newman 55'	Report	Casella 9'; Tolini 33', 49'	Stadium: Nga Puna Wai Hockey Stadium

1 March 2020 2020 FIH Pro League	New Zealand	2–3	Argentina	Christchurch, New Zealand
15:00 NZDT (UTC+13)	Lane 20', 49'	Report	Tolini 5'; Ortiz 37'; Casella 44'	Stadium: Nga Puna Wai Hockey Stadium

6 March 2020 2020 FIH Pro League	Australia	3–3 (1–3 p)	Argentina	Perth, Australia
20:30 AWST (UTC+8)	Hayward 4'; Wickham 8'; Welch 52'	Report	Ferreiro 11'; Tolini 20'; Martínez 39'	Stadium: Perth Hockey Stadium
	Penalties
	Ogilvie (penalty shoot-out scored); Wickham (penalty shoot-out missed); Simmonds (penalty shoot-out missed); Swann (penalty shoot-out missed)		(penalty shoot-out scored) Ibarra; (penalty shoot-out scored) Vila; (penalty shoot-out scored) Ortiz

7 March 2020 2020 FIH Pro League	Australia	5–1	Argentina	Perth, Australia
18:30 AWST (UTC+8)	Simmonds 10'; Govers 24', 30'; Wickham 44'; Mitton 49'	Report	Tolini 57'	Stadium: Perth Hockey Stadium

16 May 2020 2020 FIH Pro League	Great Britain	Postponed	Argentina	London, Great Britain
16:30 BST (UTC+1)		Report		Stadium: Twickenham Stoop

17 May 2020 2020 FIH Pro League	Great Britain	Postponed	Argentina	London, Great Britain
15:30 BST (UTC+1)		Report		Stadium: Twickenham Stoop

21 May 2020 2020 FIH Pro League	Belgium	Postponed	Argentina	Antwerp, Belgium
20:30 CEST (UTC+2)		Report		Stadium: Wilrijkse Plein

23 May 2020 2020 FIH Pro League	Belgium	Postponed	Argentina	Antwerp, Belgium
20:30 CEST (UTC+2)		Report		Stadium: Wilrijkse Plein

30 May 2020 2020 FIH Pro League	Argentina	Postponed	Germany	San Miguel de Tucumán, Argentina
14:30 ART (UTC−3)		Report		Stadium: Club Natación y Gimnasia

31 May 2020 2020 FIH Pro League	Argentina	Postponed	Germany	San Miguel de Tucumán, Argentina
14:30 ART (UTC−3)		Report		Stadium: Club Natación y Gimnasia

5 June 2020 2020 FIH Pro League	Argentina	Postponed	India	San Miguel de Tucumán, Argentina
17:00 ART (UTC−3)		Report		Stadium: Club Natación y Gimnasia

6 June 2020 2020 FIH Pro League	Argentina	Postponed	India	San Miguel de Tucumán, Argentina
17:00 ART (UTC−3)		Report		Stadium: Club Natación y Gimnasia

25 July 2020 2020 Summer Olympics	Argentina	Postponed	Spain	Tokyo, Japan
12:15 JST (UTC+9)				Stadium: Oi Hockey Stadium

26 July 2020 2020 Summer Olympics	Japan	Postponed	Argentina	Tokyo, Japan
19:00 JST (UTC+9)				Stadium: Oi Hockey Stadium

28 July 2020 2020 Summer Olympics	Argentina	Postponed	Australia	Tokyo, Japan
09:30 JST (UTC+9)				Stadium: Oi Hockey Stadium

30 July 2020 2020 Summer Olympics	India	Postponed	Argentina	Tokyo, Japan
09:30 JST (UTC+9)				Stadium: Oi Hockey Stadium

31 July 2020 2020 Summer Olympics	Argentina	Postponed	New Zealand	Tokyo, Japan
19:00 JST (UTC+9)				Stadium: Oi Hockey Stadium

=== 2020 goalscoring Table ===
Player	Goals
Leandro Tolini	13
Maico Casella	5
Lucas Martínez	5
Martín Ferreiro	4
Lucas Vila	3
Agustín Mazzilli	2
Tomás Domene	1
Federico Fernández	1
Pedro Ibarra	1
Ignacio Ortiz	1

== Annual call-ups ==
2019

Coach: Germán Orozco

- Nicolás Acosta (25)
- Tomás Bettaglio (19)
- Emiliano Bosso (3)
- Agustín Bugallo (30)
- Maico Casella (9)
- Juan Catán (4)
- Nicolás Cicileo (24)
- Nicolás della Torre (14)
- Tomás Domene (15)
- Federico Fernández (28)
- Martín Ferreiro (32)
- Thomas Habif (29)
- Isidoro Ibarra (20)
- Pedro Ibarra (5)
- Nicolás Keenan (7)
- Juan Martín López (17)
- Lucas Martínez (23)
- Agustín Mazzilli (26)
- Joaquín Menini (11)
- Federico Monja (18)
- Federico Moreschi (8)
- Ignacio Ortiz (16)
- Matías Paredes (10)
- Gonzalo Peillat (2)
- Matías Rey (22)
- Lucas Rossi (27)
- Tomás Santiago (21)
- Santiago Tarazona (6)
- Leandro Tolini (13)
- Lucas Toscani (31)
- Lucas Vila (12)
- Juan Manuel Vivaldi (1)
2020

Coach: Germán Orozco—January

- Tomás Bettaglio (19)
- Emiliano Bosso (3)
- Agustín Bugallo (30)
- Facundo Callioni (14) ▲
- Maico Casella (9)
- Juan Catán (4)
- Nicolás Cicileo (24)
- Mauro Coria (31) ▲
- Tomás Domene (15)
- Federico Fernández (28)
- Martín Ferreiro (32)
- Pedro Ibarra (5)
- Nicolás Keenan (7)
- Juan Martín López (17)
- Lucas Martínez (23)
- Agustín Mazzilli (26)
- Federico Monja (18)
- Ignacio Ortiz (16)
- Matías Rey (22)
- Lucas Rossi (27)
- Tomás Santiago (21)
- Santiago Tarazona (6)
- Leandro Tolini (13)
- Lucas Vila (12)
- Juan Manuel Vivaldi (1)

Coach: Mariano Ronconi—October

- Nicolás Acosta ▲
- Emiliano Bosso (3)
- Agustín Bugallo (30)
- Maico Casella (9)
- Juan Catán (4)
- Nicolás Cicileo (24)
- Federico Fernández (28)
- Martín Ferreiro (32)
- Thomas Habif ▲
- Nehuen Hernando ▲
- Pedro Ibarra (5)
- Isidoro Ibarra ▲
- Nicolás Keenan (7)
- Juan Martín López (17)
- Lucas Martínez (23)
- Agustín Mazzilli (26)
- Federico Monja (18)
- Federico Moreschi ▲
- Ignacio Nepote ▲
- Ignacio Ortiz (16)
- Matías Rey (22)
- Tomás Santiago (21)
- Santiago Tarazona (6)
- Leandro Tolini (13)
- Lucas Toscani ▲
- Diego Paz ▲
- Lucas Vila (12)
- Juan Manuel Vivaldi (1)
2021

Coach: Mariano Ronconi—January

- Nicolás Acosta (25)
- Emiliano Bosso (3)
- Agustín Bugallo (30)
- Maico Casella (9)
- Juan Catán (4)
- Nicolás Cicileo (24)
- Thomas Habif (29)
- Nehuén Hernando (2)
- Isidoro Ibarra (20)
- Pedro Ibarra (5)
- Federico Fernández (28)
- Martín Ferreiro (32)
- Nicolás Keenan (7)
- Juan Martín López (17)
- Lucas Martínez (23)
- Agustín Mazzilli (26)
- Federico Monja (18)
- Ignacio Nepote (19)
- Ignacio Ortiz (16)
- Diego Paz (15)
- Joaquín Puglisi (11) ▲
- Matías Rey (22)
- Tomás Santiago (21)
- Santiago Tarazona (6)
- Leandro Tolini (13)
- Lucas Toscani (31)
- Lucas Vila (12)
- Juan Manuel Vivaldi (1)

Added in March:

- Gaspar Garrone (33) ▲
- Facundo Zárate (34) ▲

Added in April:

- Nahuel Salis (8) ▲

Added in June:

- Lucas Rossi (27) ▲

Coach: Mariano Ronconi—November

- Nicolás Acosta (25)
- Emiliano Bosso (3)
- Agustín Bugallo (30)
- Maico Casella (9)
- Juan Catán (4)
- Nicolás Cicileo (24)
- Nicolás della Torre (14) ▲
- Thomas Habif (29)
- Nehuén Hernando (2)
- Federico Fernández (28)
- Martín Ferreiro (32)
- Ladislao Gencarelli ▲
- Nicolás Keenan (7)
- Agustín Machelett ▲
- Lucas Martínez (23)
- Tobías Martins ▲
- Agustín Mazzilli (26)
- Federico Monja (18)
- Ignacio Nepote (19)
- Ignacio Ortiz (16)
- Diego Paz (15)
- Joaquín Puglisi (11)
- Matías Rey (22)
- Nahuel Salis (8)
- Tomás Santiago (1)
- Santiago Tarazona (6)
- Leandro Tolini (13)
- Lucas Toscani (31)
- Lucas Vila (12)
- Facundo Zárate (34)

Added in December:

- Tomás Domene (21) ▲
2022

Coach: Mariano Ronconi—January

- Nicolás Acosta (25)
- Emiliano Bosso (3)
- Agustín Bugallo (30)
- Maico Casella (9)
- Juan Catán (4)
- Nicolás Cicileo (24)
- Joaquín Coelho (33) ▲
- Nicolás della Torre (14)
- Tomás Domene (21)
- Gaspar Dubarry (35) ▲
- Federico Fernández (28)
- Martín Ferreiro (32)
- Ladislao Gencarelli (20)
- Thomas Habif (29)
- Nehuén Hernando (2)
- Nicolás Keenan (7)
- Agustín Machelett (27)
- Lucas Martínez (23)
- Tobías Martins (34)
- Agustín Mazzilli (26)
- Federico Monja (18)
- Ignacio Nepote (19)
- ~~Ignacio Ortiz~~
- Diego Paz (15)
- Joaquín Puglisi (11)
- Matías Rey (22)
- Nahuel Salis (8)
- Tomás Santiago (1)
- Santiago Tarazona (6)
- Leandro Tolini (13)
- Lucas Toscani (31)
- ~~Lucas Vila~~
- Facundo Zárate (5)

Added in March:

- Franco Agostini (43) ▲
- Eugenio Balboa (42) ▲
- Santiago Binaghi (53) ▲
- Bautista Capurro (41) ▲
- Gonzalo Driemel (45) ▲
- Francisco Druziuk (56) ▲
- Lautaro Ferrero (50) ▲
- Ignacio Ibarra (44) ▲
- Máximo Kiernan (49) ▲
- Tadeo Marcucci (46) ▲
- Felipe Merlini (55) ▲
- Juan Ronconi (40) ▲
- Facundo Sarto (48) ▲
- Tobías Silvetti (54) ▲
- Jaime Terzi (47) ▲
- Santiago Torrigiani (52) ▲
- Joaquín Toscani (51) ▲
2023

Coach: Mariano Ronconi—July

- Agustín Bugallo (30)
- Bautista Capurro (31)
- Maico Casella (9)
- Juan Catán (4)
- Nicolás Cicileo (24)
- Nicolás della Torre (14)
- Juan Ignacio Díaz ▲
- Tomás Domene (21)
- Martín Ferreiro (32)
- Lautaro Ferrero (63)
- Ladislao Gencarelli (20)
- Thomas Habif (29)
- Nehuén Hernando (24)
- Nicolás Keenan (7)
- Juaquín Krüger ▲
- Agustín Machelett (2)
- Lucas Martínez (23)
- Tobías Martins (34)
- Agustín Mazzilli (26)
- Lucio Méndez Pin
- Federico Monja (18)
- Ignacio Nepote (8)
- Matías Rey (22)
- Tomás Santiago (1)
- Santiago Tarazona (6)
- Lucas Toscani (31)
- Gonzalo Yanello ▲
- Facundo Zárate (5)
2024

Coach: Mariano Ronconi—January

- Agustín Bonano ▲
- Agustín Bugallo (30)
- Bautista Capurro (31)
- Maico Casella (9)
- Juan Catán (4)
- Nicolás della Torre (14)
- Tomás Domene (21)
- Thomas Habif (29)
- Nehuén Hernando (24)
- Nicolás Keenan (7)
- Agustín Machelett (2)
- Tadeo Marcucci (27)
- Lucas Martínez (23)
- Tobías Martins (34)
- Agustín Mazzilli (26)
- Felipe Merlini (55) ▲
- Lucio Méndez Pin (33)
- Iñaki Minadeo ▲
- Federico Monja (18)
- Matías Rey (22)
- Tomás Santiago (1)
- Santiago Tarazona (6)
- Joaquín Toscani ▲
- Lucas Toscani (31)
- Gonzalo Yanello (35)
- Facundo Zárate (5)

Coach: Lucas Rey—August

- Nicolás Acosta ▲
- Franco Agostini ▲
- Matías Andreotti ▲
- Agustín Bonanno ▲
- Agustín Bugallo (30)
- Bautista Capurro (31)
- Bruno Correa ▲
- Maico Casella (9)
- Juan Catán (4)
- Nicolás della Torre (14)
- Tomás Domene (21)
- Juan Fernández ▲
- Matteo Fernández (6)
- Thomas Habif (29)
- Ignacio Ibarra ▲
- Nicolás Keenan (7)
- Agustín Machelett (2)
- Tadeo Marcucci (27)
- Lucas Martínez (23)
- Tobías Martins (34)
- Felipe Merlini (55)
- Iñaki Minadeo (41)
- Federico Monja (18)
- Ignacio Nardolillo ▲
- Matías Rey (22)
- Nicolás Rodríguez ▲
- Tomás Ruiz ▲
- Francisco Ruiz ▲
- Joaquín Ruiz ▲
- Tomás Santiago (1)
- Santiago Tarazona (6)
- Joaquín Toscani
- Lucas Toscani (31)
- Gonzalo Yanello (35)
- Facundo Zárate (5)
2025

Coach: Lucas Rey—January

- Franco Agostini
- Matías Andreotti (20)
- Agustín Bonanno (38)
- Santiago Binaghi (44) ▲
- ~~Agustín Bugallo (30)~~
- Bautista Capurro (31)
- Bruno Correa (32)
- Maico Casella (9)
- Juan Catán (4)
- Nicolás Cicileo (26) ▲
- Nicolás della Torre (10)
- Lautaro Domene (19) ▲
- Tomás Domene (21)
- Matteo Fernández (6)
- Thomas Habif (29)
- Nehuén Hernando (12) ▲
- Ignacio Ibarra (28)
- Nicolás Keenan (7)
- Joaquín Kruger (24) ▲
- Agustín Machelett (2)
- Tadeo Marcucci (27)
- Lucas Martínez (23)
- Tobías Martins (8)
- Lucio Méndez Pin (33) ▲
- Felipe Merlini (55)
- Santos Milito (46) ▲
- Iñaki Minadeo (41)
- Ignacio Nardolillo (35)
- Joaquín Puglisi (43) ▲
- Matías Rey (22)
- Nicolás Rodríguez (3)
- Tomás Ruiz (15)
- Joaquín Ruiz (25)
- Tomás Santiago (1)
- Facundo Sarto (18) ▲
- Santiago Tarazona (6)
- Jaime Terzi ▲
- Joaquín Toscani (16)
- Lucas Toscani (11)
- Gonzalo Yanello (42)
- Facundo Zárate (5)

Coach: Lucas Rey—December

- Franco Agostini (39)
- Matías Andreotti (20)
- Agustín Bonanno (38)
- Santiago Binaghi (44)
- Bautista Capurro (31)
- Bruno Correa (32)
- Maico Casella (9)
- Juan Catán (4)
- Nicolás Cicileo (26)
- Nicolás della Torre (10)
- Lautaro Domene (19)
- Tomás Domene (21)
- Matteo Fernández (6)
- Martín Ferreiro (30) ▲
- Thomas Habif (29)
- Nehuén Hernando (12)
- Ignacio Ibarra (28)
- Nicolás Keenan (7)
- Joaquín Kruger (24)
- Tadeo Marcucci (27)
- Lucas Martínez (23)
- Tobías Martins (8)
- Lucio Méndez Pin (33)
- Felipe Merlini (55)
- Santos Milito (46)
- Iñaki Minadeo (41)
- Ignacio Nardolillo (14)
- Lucas Redondo (36) ▲
- Matías Rey (22)
- Nicolás Rodríguez (3)
- Francisco Ruiz (40) ▲
- Joaquín Ruiz (25)
- Tomás Ruiz (15)
- Tomás Santiago (1)
- Facundo Sarto (18)
- Tomás Suárez (39) ▲
- Santiago Tarazona (17)
- Jaime Terzi (34)
- Joaquín Toscani (16)
- Lucas Toscani (11)
- Facundo Zárate (5)

^1: Players overlined were initially called-up but quit or got retired before any competition of that year.
^2: Players in italic are part of a projection group or invitational.

== Squad records in official competitions ==
2001-2010

Jersey #	Competitions															
Jersey #	2001	2002	2003		2004		2005	2006			2007		2008	2009		2010
Jersey #	CC	WC	PAG	CT	PAC	OG	CC	CT	WC	SAG	CC	PAG	CT	PAC	CC	WC
1	Moreira						Vivaldi									
2	Hourquebie								Hourquebie	Encinas	Gilardi					
3	Caldas		Cammareri L.			Caldas	Ibarra	López					López	Bergner		
4	Vila M.												Vila M.			
5	Paulón											Ibarra		Ibarra		
6		Chao					Chao				Chao			Argento L.		
7	Almada										Almada					Almada
8		Retegui				Retegui	Rey L.			Corradini	Rey L.					
9		Vila R.	Esparis		Vila R.		Argento T.	Vila R.								
10	MacCormik												Paredes			
11	Capurro		Paredes	Ávila	Capurro		Cammareri L.						Cammareri L.			
12	Riccardi						Riccardi				Vila L.					
13	Lombi									Saliva	Lombi		Garreta			
14	Zylberberg										Zylberberg			González J.	Zylberberg	
15	Orozco														González J.	
16	Oscaris			Esparis			Oscaris		Oscaris							
17	Paredes			Paredes								Paredes		López		
18		Garreta		Rey L.	Garreta		Callioni				Garreta					
19	Vivaldi			Vivaldi				Cammareri M.							Montelli	
20				Garreta	Ávila			Argento T.								
21					García González			Vila L.								
22					Rey L.			Rey M.			Rey M.					Rey M.
23	Deambarsi					Cammareri L.				Espinosa					Espinosa	
24										Argento L.					Brunet	
25															Oleastro	
26								Ibarra			Ibarra		González J.		Mazzilli	
27										Rossi					Rossi	
28													Callioni			
29											Corradini		Corradini			
30										Saladino					González M.	Vila M.
31										Bergner						
32										González M.						
HC	Jorge Ruiz							Sergio Vigil					Carlos Retegui		Pablo Lombi	
Result	3rd place, bronze medalist(s)	6th	1st place, gold medalist(s)	5th	1st place, gold medalist(s)	11th	1st place, gold medalist(s)	6th	10th	1st place, gold medalist(s)		2nd place, silver medalist(s)	3rd place, bronze medalist(s)	3rd place, bronze medalist(s)	4th	7th

2011-2020

Jersey #	Competitions																								
Jersey #	2011		2012		2013				2014				2015			2016	2017			2018			2019		2020
Jersey #	PAG	CCI	OG	CCI	SAG	WLR2	WLS	PAC	WLF	SAG	WC	CT	WLS	PAG	WLF	OG	WLS	PAC	WLF	SAG	CT	WC	PL	PAG	PL
1	Vivaldi					Vivaldi															Vivaldi				
2		Pacheco		Peillat																	Peillat				
3	Bergner				Bergner				Bergner	Martínez								Tarazona		Catán			Bosso		Bosso
4	Vila M.		Vila M.			Vila M.	Gilardi											Gilardi		Rothbart	Gilardi		Catán		Catán
5	Ibarra P.					Ibarra P.															Ibarra P.				
6	Argento							Tolini				Cicileo					Tolini		Tarazona	Bugallo	Tarazona		Tarazona		Tarazona
7			Callioni			Callioni						Callioni				Callioni			Andino				Keenan		
8	Rey L.					Rey L.									Rey L.				Salis				Moreschi		
9	Vila R.					Vila R.	Andino			Andino	Trevisán						Casella			Acosta	Casella				
10	Paredes		Paredes		Paredes																Paredes				
11	Cammareri									Menini										Moreschi	Menini				
12	Vila L.										Vila L.										Vila L.				
13							Garreta				Martínez				Sabaz		Sabaz			Sacchetti			Tolini		
14	Zylberberg			Schickendantz						Schickendantz		Trevisán			Masso					Ferreiro					
15		Salis		Salis				Salis							Paz		Paz		Paz						Domene
16		Menini		Ortíz				Ortíz				Ortíz									Ortíz				
17	López										López										López				
18			Montelli		Montelli		Barreiros													Santiago	della Torre		Monja		Monja
19				Agulleiro				Agulleiro					della Torre			Saladino				Bettaglio		Bettaglio			Bettaglio
20										González			Ibarra I.			Ibarra I.					Ibarra I.		Ibarra I.		
21					Camacho				Camacho						Oleastro					Rodríguez	Santiago				
22							Rey M.				Rey M.										Rey M.				
23				Espinosa																	Martínez				
24	Brunet										Brunet									Garrone	Cicileo				
25	Bermejillo				Bermejillo													Ganly					Acosta		
26	Mazzilli																					Mazzilli			
27	Rossi								Rossi		Rossi							Rossi				Rossi			
28		Peillat			della Torre													Merino		Merino			Fernández		
29																							Habif		
30		González		González			Berthold				Abratte		Berthold				Bugallo				Bugallo				
31																		Abratte		Gómez			Toscani		Coria
32																				Córdoba			Ferreiro		
HC	Pablo Lombi			Franco Nicola			Carlos Retegui														Germán Orozco				
Result	1st place, gold medalist(s)	4th	7th	1st place, gold medalist(s)		Adv		1st place, gold medalist(s)	8th	1st place, gold medalist(s)	3rd place, bronze medalist(s)	6th	Adv	1st place, gold medalist(s)	5th	1st place, gold medalist(s)	Adv	1st place, gold medalist(s)	2nd place, silver medalist(s)	1st place, gold medalist(s)	4th	7th	5th	1st place, gold medalist(s)	Interrupted

*All competitions scheduled to be held in 2020, were interrupted because of the COVID-19 pandemic and rescheduled for the following year.

=== 2021– ===
Jersey #	Competitions																
Jersey #	2021		2022				2023		2024		2025		2026			2027	
Jersey #	PL*	OG	PAC	PL	SAG	PL	WC	PAG	PL	OG	PL	PAC	PL	WC	SAG	PL	PAG
1	Vivaldi		Santiago			Santiago										Santiago	
2	Hernando			Hernando	Machelett			Machelett			Machelett						
3	Bosso		Bosso												Kovalivker		
4	Catán			Catán									Catán		Dulor		
5	Ibarra P.			Zárate					Zárate		Zárate					Zárate	
6	Tarazona								Fernández M.		Fernández M.				Fernández M.		
7	Keenan			Keenan		Keenan										Keenan	
8		Salis				Nepote			Nepote	Martins			Martins			Martins	
9	Casella					Casella									Costa	Casella	
10						Ferreiro				della Torre						della Torre	
11				Puglisi		Toscani L.									Serrano	Toscani L.	
12	Vila				Vila						Hernando		Hernando			Hernando	
13	Tolini																
14			della Torre			della Torre							Nardolillo			Nardolillo	
15	Paz										Ruiz T.						
16	Ortiz					Cicileo					Toscani J.					Toscani J.	
17	López				Tarazona								Tarazona		Tarazona		
18	Monja		Monja			Monja					Sarto		Sarto		Torrigiani	Sarto	
19				Nepote							Domene L.		Domene L.				
20	Ibarra Is.			Gencarelli		Gencarelli					Andreotti					Andreotti	
21			Domene T.			Domene T.										Domene T.	
22	Rey																
23	Martínez					Martínez		Martínez									
24		Cicileo			Hernando				Hernando		Kruger				Fernández J.	Serrano	
25				Acosta					Toscani J.		Ruiz J.				Ruiz J.		
26		Mazzilli		Mazzilli		Mazzilli					Cicileo						
27		Rossi	Machelett		Marcucci			Marcucci								Marcucci	
28	Fernández F.		Fernández F.			Fernández F.					Ibarra Ig.		Ibarra Ig.			Ibarra Ig.	
29	Habif																
30	Bugallo					Bugallo							Rodríguez		Rodríguez		
31	Toscani L.		Toscani L.		Capurro				Capurro						Bártoli	Capurro	
32	Ferreiro		Ferreiro			Bosso					Correa		Ferreiro				
33				Coelho		Mendez Pin			Mendez Pin		Mendez Pin					Mendez Pin	
34				Martins					Martins								
35						Nardolillo									Bonanno F.		
38											Bonanno A.		Bonanno A.			Bonanno A.	
39															Agostini		
40				Ronconi													
41				Capurro					Minadeo				Minadeo		Minadeo		
42									Ruiz T.		Yanello						
43				Agostini													
44				Ibarra Ig.					Ibarra Ig.								
46				Marcucci													
48				Sarto													
49				Kiernan													
50				Ferrero													
53				Binaghi													
54				Silvetti													
55				Merlini		Merlini			Merlini		Merlini						
56				Druziuk													
63					Ferrero												
HC	Mariano Ronconi	Carlos Retegui	Mariano Ronconi								Lucas Rey				Juan Vivaldi	Lucas Rey	
Result	7th		1st place, gold medalist(s)	5th	1st place, gold medalist(s)	8th	9th	1st place, gold medalist(s)	4th	8th	6th	1st place, gold medalist(s)	5th	3rd place, bronze medalist(s)	1st place, gold medalist(s)	Qualified	

* The Men's FIH Pro League since its second edition, takes place between the second half of a year and the first half of the following. The only exception is the second edition, which it was planned to be held from January to June 2020, but it was interrupted because of the COVID-19 pandemic and changed its schedule since.

Current player

== See also ==
- Argentina men's national under-21 field hockey team
- Argentina women's national field hockey squad records
