= 2022–23 Men's FIH Pro League squads =

This article lists the squads of all participating teams in the 2022–23 FIH Pro League. The nine national teams involved in the tournament were required to register a squad of up to 32 players.

== Argentina ==
The following is the Argentina squad for the 2022–23 FIH Pro League.

Head coach: Mariano Ronconi

1. Tomás Santiago (GK)
2. Agustin Machelett
4. Juan Catán
5. Facundo Zárate
7. Nicolás Keenan
8. Ignacio Nepote
9. Maico Casella
10. Martín Ferreiro
11. Lucas Toscani
12. Lucas Vila
13. José Tolini
14. Nicolás Della Torre
15. Diego Paz
16. Nicolás Cicileo
17. Santiago Tarazona
18. Federico Monja
19. Joaquín Puglisi
20. Ladislao Gencarelli
21. Tomás Domene
22. Matías Rey (C)
23. Lucas Martínez
24. Nehuen Hernando
25. Nicolás Acosta
26. Agustín Mazzilli
27. Tadeo Marcucci
28. Federico Fernández
29. Thomas Habif
30. Agustín Bugallo
31. Bautista Capurro
32. Emiliano Bosso (GK)
34. Tobias Martins
40. Juan Ronconi
48. Facundo Sarto
63. Lautaro Ferrero

== Australia ==
The following is the Australia squad for the 2022–23 FIH Pro League.

Head coach: Colin Batch

1. Lachlan Sharp
2. Tom Craig
3. Corey Weyer
4. Jake Harvie
5. Thomas Wickham
6. Matthew Dawson
7. Nathan Ephraums
8. Johan Durst (GK)
9. Jacob Anderson
10. Joshua Beltz
11. Edward Ockenden (C)
12. Jacob Whetton
13. Blake Govers
14. Dylan Martin
15. Joshua Simmonds
16. Tim Howard
17. Aran Zalewski (C)
18. Benjamin Rennie (GK)
19. Craig Marais
20. Ky Willott
21. Jack Welch
22. Flynn Ogilvie
23. Daniel Beale
24. Jayden Atkinson
26. James Collins
27. Joel Rintala
29. Tim Brand
30. Andrew Charter (GK)
32. Jeremy Hayward

== Belgium ==
The following is the Belgium squad for the 2022–23 FIH Pro League.

Head coach: (Netherlands) Michel van den Heuvel

1. Simon Vandenbroucke (GK)
2. Loic van Doren (GK)
3. Thibeau Stockbroekx
4. Arthur van Doren
5. Nicolas Poncelet
7. John-John Dohmen
8. Florent van Aubel
9. Sébastien Dockier
10. Cédric Charlier
11. Tommy Willems
12. Gauthier Boccard
13. Nicolas de Kerpel
15. Emmanuel Stockbroekx
16. Alexander Hendrickx
17. Guillermo Hainaut
19. Félix Denayer (C)
20. William Ghislain
21. Vincent Vanasch (GK)
22. Simon Gougnard
23. Arthur de Sloover
24. Antoine Kina
25. Loïck Luypaert
26. Victor Wegnez
27. Tom Boon
28. Tobias Biekens
29. Maxime van Oost
30. Nelson Onana
31. Arno van Dessel
32. Tanguy Cosyns
33. Jeremy Wilbers
34. Augustin Raemdonck
35. Dylan Englebert
40. Roman Duvekot
41. Guillaume van Marcke
42. Pierre de Gratie (GK)
43. Boris Feldheim (GK)
44. Thomas Crols

== Germany ==
The following is the Germany squad for the 2022–23 FIH Pro League.

Head coach: André Henning

1. Alexander Stadler (GK)
2. Mathias Müller
3. Mats Grambusch (C)
4. Lukas Windfeder
5. Linus Müller
6. Raphael Hartkopf
7. Jonas Gomoll
9. Niklas Wellen
10. Johannes Große
11. Constantin Staib
12. Timm Herzbruch
13. Paul-Philipp Kaufmann
14. Teo Hinrichs
15. Tom Grambusch
16. Gonzalo Peillat
17. Christopher Rühr
19. Justus Weigand
20. Niklas Bosserhoff
21. Michel Struthoff
22. Marco Miltkau
23. Martin Zwicker
25. Hannes Müller
27. Timur Oruz
28. Moritz Rothländer
29. Malte Hellwig
30. Thies Prinz
32. Niklas Garst (GK)
33. Moritz Trompertz
39. Joshua Onyekwue Nnaji (GK)
44. Moritz Ludwig
74. Jean-Paul Danneberg (GK)

== Great Britain ==
The following is the Great Britain squad for the 2022–23 FIH Pro League.

Head coach: Paul Revington

2. Nicholas Park
3. Jack Waller
4. Edward Way
5. David Ames
6. Jacob Draper
7. Zachary Wallace
8. Rupert Shipperley
9. Harrison Martin (C)
10. Christopher Griffiths
11. Ian Sloan
12. James Gall
13. Samuel Ward
14. James Albery
15. Philip Roper
16. James Mazarelo (GK)
17. Stuart Rushmere
18. Brendan Creed
19. David Goodfield
20. Oliver Payne (GK)
21. Liam Ansell
22. David Condon
23. Nicholas Bandurak
24. James Oates
25. Duncan Scott
27. Liam Sanford
28. Lee Morton
29. Thomas Sorsby
30. Rhys Smith
31. William Calnan
32. Peter Scott
33. Toby Reynolds-Cotterill (GK)
40. Jack Turner
41. Timothy Nurse
46. Samuel Taylor
80. Matthew Ramshaw

Dilpreet singh Jarmanpreet singh Abhishek Manpreet singh Hardik singh Harmanpreet singh(C) Neelam Sanjeep Xess Ravindran sreejesh(GK) Sumit Samsher sign Raj kumar pal Rabichandra Moirangthem Jugraj singh Vivek sugar prasad Sulhjeet singh Karthi selvam Pawan(GK)

Coach- John Devid

== Netherlands ==
The following is the Netherlands squad for the 2022–23 FIH Pro League.

Head coach: Jeroen Delmee

1. Maurits Visser (GK)
4. Lars Balk
5. Tim Swaen
6. Jonas de Geus
7. Thijs van Dam
8. Thierry Brinkman (C)
9. Seve van Ass
10. Jorrit Croon
11. Terrance Pieters
13. Dennis Warmerdam
16. Floris Wortelboer
17. Jelle Galema
18. Teun Beins
19. Tjep Hoedemakers
20. Derk Meijer
22. Koen Bijen
23. Joep de Mol
24. Steijn van Hiejningen
26. Pirmin Blaak (GK)
27. Jip Janssen
29. Tijmen Reyenga
31. Jasper Brinkman
32. Justen Blok
34. Derck de Vilder
32. Jaïr van der Horst

== New Zealand ==
The following is the New Zealand squad for the 2022–23 FIH Pro League.

Head coach: (South Africa) Greg Nicol

1. Dominic Dixon (GK)
2. Scott Boyde
3. David Brydon
4. Dane Lett
6. Simon Child
8. Charlie Morrison
9. Samuel Hiha
10. Kim Kingstone
11. Jacob Smith
12. Samuel Lane
13. Simon Yorston
14. Jared Panchia
15. George Eneresen (GK)
16. Aidan Sarikaya
17. Nicholas Woods (C)
18. Bradley Read
19. Joseph Morrison
20. Leon Hayward (GK)
21. Kane Russell
22. Blair Tarrant
23. Dylan Thomas
24. Sean Findlay
25. Jordan Cohen
26. Connor Greentree
28. Timothy Nield
31. Hayden Phillips
32. George Baker
34. Malachi Buschl
35. Charl Ulrich
36. Patrick Ward
37. Isaac Houlbrooke
38. Benjamin Culhane

== Spain ==
The following is the Spain squad for the 2022–23 FIH Pro League.

Head coach: (Argentina) Maximiliano Caldas

1. Mario Garín (GK)
2. Alejandro Alonso
3. Enrique Zorita
4. Ricardo Sánchez
6. Xavier Gispert
7. Enrique González
8. Marc Recasens
9. Álvaro Iglesias (C)
10. José Basterra
11. Llorenç Piera
12. Marc Reyné
13. Joan Tarrés
14. Marc Miralles (C)
15. Jordi Bonastre
16. Rafael Álvarez (GK)
17. Pepe Cunill
18. Joaquín Menini
19. Marc Escudé
20. Pau Cunill
21. Adrián Rafi (GK)
23. Marc Vizcaino
24. Ignacio Rodríguez
25. Eduard de Ignacio-Simó
26. César Curiel
28. Oriol Salvador
29. Gerard Clapés
30. Antonio Sanz
31. Alejandro Dávila
32. Andreas Rafi
35. Pere Amat
37. Gonzalo Quijano
42. Luis Calzado (GK)
61. Bruno Font
62. Ignacio Cobos
90. Borja Lacalle
99. Rafael Vilallonga
