= Field hockey at the 2024 Summer Olympics – Men's team squads =

This article shows the squads of all participating teams at the men's field hockey tournament at the 2024 Summer Olympics in Paris.

Age, caps and club as of 27 July 2024.

== Group A ==
=== France ===
France announced their squad on 8 July 2024.

Head coach: Fred Soyez

No.	Pos.	Player	Date of birth (age)	Caps	Club
1	GK	Arthur Thieffry	15 September 1989 (aged 34)	117	(France) Lille
2	DF	Gaspard Xavier	10 May 2002 (aged 22)	38	(Belgium) Racing Club de Bruxelles
3	DF	Mattéo Desgouillons	21 January 2000 (aged 24)	13	(France) CA Montrouge
7	MF	Lucas Montécot	4 September 2001 (aged 22)	12	(France) CA Montrouge
8	MF	Simon Martin-Brisac	20 November 1992 (aged 31)	148	Racing Club de France
9	FW	Blaise Rogeau	26 November 1994 (aged 29)	108	(Belgium) Waterloo Ducks
10	DF	Viktor Lockwood (Captain)	29 March 1992 (aged 32)	162	(France) Lille
11	FW	Noé Jouin	2 August 2002 (aged 21)	19	(France) Saint Germain
12	DF	Amaury Bellenger	14 August 1998 (aged 25)	70	(Belgium) Uccle Sport
14	MF	Gaspard Baumgarten	3 August 1992 (aged 31)	174	(Belgium) Léopold
16	MF	François Goyet	4 November 1994 (aged 29)	153	(Belgium) Gantoise
17	DF	Christophe Peters-Deutz	17 November 1995 (aged 28)	106	Racing Club de France
18	MF	Eliot Curty	18 September 1998 (aged 25)	65	(Belgium) Waterloo Ducks
21	FW	Etienne Tynevez	13 February 1999 (aged 25)	115	(Belgium) Gantoise
22	DF	Victor Charlet	19 November 1993 (aged 30)	158	(Belgium) Waterloo Ducks
24	MF	Charles Masson	13 April 1992 (aged 32)	143	(Belgium) Gantoise
28	FW	Timothée Clément	8 April 2000 (aged 24)	65	(Belgium) Gantoise
30	DF	Brieuc Delemazure	2 April 2002 (aged 22)	28	(France) Lille

Reserves:

- Edgar Reynaud (GK)

=== Germany ===
Germany announced their squad on 14 June 2024.

Head coach: André Henning

No.	Pos.	Player	Date of birth (age)	Caps	Club
2	DF	Mathias Müller	3 April 1992 (aged 32)	175	(Germany) Hamburger Polo Club
3	MF	Mats Grambusch (Captain)	4 November 1992 (aged 31)	205	(Germany) Rot-Weiss Köln
4	DF	Lukas Windfeder	11 May 1995 (aged 29)	157	(Germany) Uhlenhorst Mülheim
9	FW	Niklas Wellen	14 December 1994 (aged 29)	205	(Germany) Crefelder HTC
10	DF	Johannes Große	7 January 1997 (aged 27)	114	(Germany) Rot-Weiss Köln
11	FW	Thies Prinz	7 July 1998 (aged 26)	74	(Germany) Rot-Weiss Köln
13	MF	Paul-Philipp Kaufmann	21 June 1996 (aged 28)	50	(Netherlands) Den Bosch
14	DF	Teo Hinrichs	17 September 1999 (aged 24)	65	(Germany) Mannheimer HC
15	DF	Tom Grambusch	4 August 1995 (aged 28)	118	(Germany) Rot-Weiss Köln
16	DF	Gonzalo Peillat	12 August 1992 (aged 31)	52	(Germany) Mannheimer HC
17	FW	Christopher Rühr	19 December 1993 (aged 30)	189	(Germany) Rot-Weiss Köln
19	FW	Justus Weigand	20 April 2000 (aged 24)	54	(Germany) Mannheimer HC
22	FW	Marco Miltkau	18 August 1990 (aged 33)	148	(Netherlands) Klein Zwitserland
23	MF	Martin Zwicker	27 February 1987 (aged 37)	318	(Germany) Berliner HC
25	MF	Hannes Müller	18 May 2000 (aged 24)	56	(Germany) UHC Hamburg
29	FW	Malte Hellwig	23 October 1997 (aged 26)	54	(Germany) Uhlenhorst Mülheim
44	DF	Moritz Ludwig	14 September 2001 (aged 22)	50	(Germany) Uhlenhorst Mülheim
74	GK	Jean Danneberg	8 November 2002 (aged 21)	28	(Germany) Rot-Weiss Köln

Reserves:

- Alexander Stadler (GK)

=== Great Britain ===
Great Britain announced their squad on 18 June 2024.

Head coach: (South Africa) Paul Revington

No.	Pos.	Player	Date of birth (age)	Caps	Club
2	DF	Nick Park	8 April 1999 (aged 25)	39	(England) Surbiton
3	MF	Jack Waller	28 January 1997 (aged 27)	116	(England) Wimbledon
5	DF	David Ames (Captain)	25 June 1989 (aged 35)	232	(England) Holcombe
6	MF	Jacob Draper	24 July 1998 (aged 26)	138	(Netherlands) Pinoké
7	MF	Zachary Wallace	29 September 1999 (aged 24)	118	(Netherlands) Bloemendaal
8	MF	Rupert Shipperley	21 November 1992 (aged 31)	177	(England) Hampstead & Westminster
13	FW	Sam Ward	24 December 1990 (aged 33)	258	(England) Old Georgians
14	DF	James Albery	2 October 1995 (aged 28)	71	(England) Old Georgians
15	FW	Phil Roper	24 January 1992 (aged 32)	254	(England) Holcombe
19	MF	David Goodfield	15 June 1993 (aged 31)	110	(England) Surbiton
20	GK	Ollie Payne	6 April 1999 (aged 25)	73	(England) Holcombe
27	DF	Liam Sanford	14 March 1996 (aged 28)	109	(England) Old Georgians
28	MF	Lee Morton	23 May 1995 (aged 29)	121	(England) Old Georgians
29	MF	Tom Sorsby	28 October 1996 (aged 27)	109	(England) Sheffield
30	DF	Conor Williamson	20 December 2001 (aged 22)	18	(England) Surbiton
31	FW	Will Calnan	17 April 1996 (aged 28)	103	(England) Southgate
33	MF	Tim Nurse	11 May 1999 (aged 25)	40	(England) Bournemouth
38	DF	Gareth Furlong	10 May 1992 (aged 32)	159	(England) Surbiton

Reserves:

- James Mazarelo (GK)

=== Netherlands ===
Netherlands announced their squad on 19 June 2024.

Head coach: Jeroen Delmee

No.	Pos.	Player	Date of birth (age)	Caps	Club
2	DF	Jip Janssen	14 October 1997 (aged 26)	108	(Netherlands) Kampong
4	DF	Lars Balk	26 February 1996 (aged 28)	134	(Netherlands) Kampong
6	MF	Jonas de Geus	29 April 1998 (aged 26)	139	(Netherlands) Kampong
7	FW	Thijs van Dam	5 January 1997 (aged 27)	107	(Netherlands) Rotterdam
8	FW	Thierry Brinkman (Captain)	19 March 1995 (aged 29)	176	(Netherlands) Bloemendaal
9	MF	Seve van Ass	10 April 1992 (aged 32)	228	(Netherlands) HGC
10	MF	Jorrit Croon	9 August 1998 (aged 25)	144	(Netherlands) Bloemendaal
12	DF	Justen Blok	27 September 2000 (aged 23)	67	(Netherlands) Rotterdam
14	MF	Derck de Vilder	23 November 1998 (aged 25)	63	(Netherlands) Kampong
16	DF	Floris Wortelboer	4 August 1996 (aged 27)	110	(Netherlands) Bloemendaal
19	FW	Tjep Hoedemakers	14 October 1999 (aged 24)	48	(Netherlands) Rotterdam
22	FW	Koen Bijen	27 July 1998 (aged 26)	58	(Netherlands) Den Bosch
23	DF	Joep de Mol	10 December 1995 (aged 28)	149	(Netherlands) Oranje-Rood
26	GK	Pirmin Blaak	8 March 1988 (aged 36)	146	(Netherlands) Oranje-Rood
29	DF	Tijmen Reyenga	10 October 1999 (aged 24)	46	(Netherlands) Oranje-Rood
51	FW	Duco Telgenkamp	17 July 2002 (aged 22)	21	(Netherlands) Kampong
77	FW	Floris Middendorp	4 June 2001 (aged 23)	31	(Netherlands) Amsterdam

Reserves:

- Steijn van Heijningen
- Derk Meijer (GK)

=== South Africa ===
South Africa announced their squad on 19 June 2024.

Head coach: Cheslyn Gie

No.	Pos.	Player	Date of birth (age)	Caps	Club
2	MF	Mustapha Cassiem	19 March 2002 (aged 22)	54	(Netherlands) HDM
3	DF	Andrew Hobson	20 March 1998 (aged 26)	31	(South Africa) Central
5	DF	Jacques van Tonder	11 April 2000 (aged 24)	27	(South Africa) WPCC Badgers
7	FW	Dayaan Cassiem (Captain)	1 December 1998 (aged 25)	77	(Netherlands) HDM
9	FW	Bradley Sherwood	28 May 1999 (aged 25)	42	(England) Oxted
10	FW	Keenan Horne	17 June 1992 (aged 32)	119	(France) Paris Jean-Bouin
11	FW	Tevin Kok	20 October 1996 (aged 27)	69	(Ireland) Pembroke Wanderers
13	DF	Matthew Guise-Brown	13 September 1991 (aged 32)	67	(England) Hampstead & Westminster
19	MF	Ryan Julius	19 June 1995 (aged 29)	81	(South Africa) Central
22	DF	Daniel Bell	28 September 1994 (aged 29)	106	(Belgium) Daring
23	MF	Nicholas Spooner	28 August 1991 (aged 32)	71	(Germany) Harvestehuder THC
24	MF	Zenani Kraai	5 November 2000 (aged 23)	18	(South Africa) Langa
27	FW	Nqobile Ntuli	15 January 1996 (aged 28)	103	(Germany) Harvestehuder THC
29	MF	Samkelo Mvimbi	23 January 1999 (aged 25)	58	(South Africa) WPCC Badgers
32	GK	Gowan Jones	24 June 1989 (aged 35)	90	(South Africa) Riverside
46	DF	Calvin Davis	22 November 2003 (aged 20)	1	(South Africa) Tuks

Reserves:

- Hendrik Kriek (GK)
- Nduduzo Lembethe

=== Spain ===
Spain announced their squad on 13 June 2024.

Head coach: (Argentina) Maximiliano Caldas

No.	Pos.	Player	Date of birth (age)	Caps	Club
2	DF	Alejandro Alonso	14 February 1999 (aged 25)	93	(Spain) Tenis
5	DF	Jordi Bonastre	7 August 2000 (aged 23)	73	(Spain) Atlètic Terrassa
6	DF	Xavier Gispert	1 April 1999 (aged 25)	77	(Spain) Club Egara
7	FW	Rafael Vilallonga	28 November 2001 (aged 22)	48	(Spain) Club de Campo
8	MF	Pepe Cunill	9 July 2001 (aged 23)	60	(Spain) Atlètic Terrassa
9	FW	Álvaro Iglesias (Captain)	1 March 1993 (aged 31)	231	(Spain) Club de Campo
10	FW	José Basterra	3 January 1997 (aged 27)	73	(Spain) Club de Campo
11	MF	Gerard Clapés	13 September 2000 (aged 23)	67	(Netherlands) Oranje-Rood
12	FW	Marc Reyné	18 May 1999 (aged 25)	65	(Spain) Real Club de Polo
14	MF	Marc Miralles	14 November 1997 (aged 26)	115	(Netherlands) Bloemendaal
15	GK	Luis Calzado	15 November 2000 (aged 23)	41	(Spain) Real Club de Polo
17	DF	Marc Recasens	13 September 1999 (aged 24)	90	(Spain) Real Club de Polo
18	MF	Joaquín Menini	18 August 1991 (aged 32)	63	(Netherlands) Rotterdam
19		Marc Vizcaino	30 April 1999 (aged 25)	21	(Spain) Atlètic Terrassa
21	FW	Borja Lacalle	21 May 2001 (aged 23)	56	(Spain) Club de Campo
23	MF	Eduard de Ignacio-Simó	3 March 2000 (aged 24)	27	(Spain) CD Terrassa
24	DF	Ignacio Rodríguez	12 June 1996 (aged 28)	120	(Spain) Club de Campo
26	FW	Bruno Font	15 November 2004 (aged 19)	25	(Spain) Junior FC

Reserves:

- Rafael Revilla (GK)

== Group B ==
=== Argentina ===
Argentina announced their final squad on 7 June 2024.

Head coach: Mariano Ronconi

No.	Pos.	Player	Date of birth (age)	Caps	Club
1	GK	Tomás Santiago	15 June 1992 (aged 32)	79	(Belgium) Herakles
4	DF	Juan Catán	5 October 1995 (aged 28)	79	(Argentina) Hurling
7	MF	Nicolás Keenan	6 May 1997 (aged 27)	75	(Netherlands) Klein Zwitserland
9	FW	Maico Casella	5 June 1997 (aged 27)	134	(Argentina) San Fernando
10	DF	Nicolás Della Torre	1 March 1990 (aged 34)	108	(Belgium) Dragons
11	MF	Lucas Toscani	22 September 1999 (aged 24)	60	(Netherlands) Laren
17	MF	Santiago Tarazona	31 May 1996 (aged 28)	120	(Argentina) GEBA
18	DF	Federico Monja	12 September 1993 (aged 30)	79	(Argentina) Banco Provincia
21	FW	Tomas Domene	4 September 1997 (aged 26)	77	(Belgium) Orée
22	MF	Matías Rey (Captain)	1 December 1984 (aged 39)	286	(Argentina) San Fernando
23	FW	Lucas Martínez	17 November 1993 (aged 30)	132	(Belgium) Dragons
26	FW	Agustín Mazzilli	20 June 1989 (aged 35)	270	(Argentina) Lomas
27	DF	Tadeo Marcucci	3 May 2001 (aged 23)	32	(Argentina) Lomas
29	MF	Thomas Habif	27 May 1996 (aged 28)	75	(Germany) Harvestehuder THC
30	MF	Agustín Bugallo	23 April 1995 (aged 29)	131	(Argentina) Mitre
31	FW	Bautista Capurro	22 October 2003 (aged 20)	28	(Argentina) Ciudad
41	DF	Iñaki Minadeo	9 June 2003 (aged 21)	8	(Argentina) Banco Provincia

Reserves:

- Nehuén Hernando (GK)
- Tobías Martins

=== Australia ===
Australia announced their squad on 8 July 2024.

Head coach: Colin Batch

No.	Pos.	Player	Date of birth (age)	Caps	Goals	Club
1	MF	Lachlan Sharp	2 July 1997 (aged 27)	101	20	(Australia) Zig Zag
2	FW	Thomas Craig	3 September 1995 (aged 28)	136	45	(Australia) Ryde Hunters Hill
3	DF	Corey Weyer	28 March 1996 (aged 28)	63	3	(Australia) Labrador
4	DF	Jake Harvie	5 March 1998 (aged 26)	139	5	(Australia) West Side Wolves
5	FW	Tom Wickham	26 May 1990 (aged 34)	108	49	(Australia) Waikerie
6	DF	Matthew Dawson	27 April 1994 (aged 30)	209	13	(Australia) Norths
7	FW	Nathan Ephraums	9 June 1999 (aged 25)	71	33	(Australia) Southern United
10	DF	Joshua Beltz	24 April 1995 (aged 29)	119	5	(Australia) Diamond Backs
11	DF	Eddie Ockenden	3 April 1987 (aged 37)	445	73	(Australia) North West Grads
12	MF	Jacob Whetton	16 May 1991 (aged 33)	277	80	(Australia) Brisbane Blaze
13	FW	Blake Govers	6 July 1996 (aged 28)	161	147	(Australia) Reds
17	MF	Aran Zalewski (Captain)	21 March 1991 (aged 33)	261	35	(Australia) Reds
20	MF	Ky Willott	15 March 2001 (aged 23)	51	14	(Australia) North Newcastle
22	MF	Flynn Ogilvie	17 September 1993 (aged 30)	169	29	(Australia) University of Wollongong
29	FW	Tim Brand	29 November 1998 (aged 25)	97	35	(Australia) Ryde Hunters Hill
30	GK	Andrew Charter	30 March 1987 (aged 37)	245	0	(Australia) Central
32	DF	Jeremy Hayward	3 March 1993 (aged 31)	227	120	(Australia) Waratahs

Reserves:

- Tim Howard
- Johan Durst (GK)

=== Belgium ===
Belgium announced their squad on 6 July 2024.

Head coach: (Netherlands) Michel van den Heuvel

No.	Pos.	Player	Date of birth (age)	Caps	Club
2	GK	Loic Van Doren	14 September 1996 (aged 27)	58	(Belgium) Dragons
3	FW	Thibeau Stockbroekx	20 July 2000 (aged 24)	39	(Netherlands) Oranje-Rood
4	DF	Arthur Van Doren	1 October 1994 (aged 29)	241	(Netherlands) Bloemendaal
7	MF	John-John Dohmen	24 January 1988 (aged 36)	475	(Belgium) Orée
8	FW	Florent van Aubel	25 October 1991 (aged 32)	295	(Netherlands) Pinoké
10	FW	Cédric Charlier	27 November 1987 (aged 36)	380	(Belgium) Racing
12	DF	Gauthier Boccard	26 August 1991 (aged 32)	298	(Belgium) Léopold
13	FW	Nicolas De Kerpel	23 March 1993 (aged 31)	124	(Belgium) Herakles
16	DF	Alexander Hendrickx	6 August 1993 (aged 30)	192	(Netherlands) Pinoké
19	MF	Félix Denayer (Captain)	31 January 1990 (aged 34)	396	(Belgium) Dragons
21	GK	Vincent Vanasch	21 December 1987 (aged 36)	283	(Belgium) Orée
23	DF	Arthur De Sloover	3 May 1997 (aged 27)	161	(Netherlands) Oranje-Rood
24	MF	Antoine Kina	13 February 1996 (aged 28)	120	(Belgium) Gantoise
25	DF	Loïck Luypaert	19 August 1991 (aged 32)	309	(Belgium) Braxgata
26	MF	Victor Wegnez	25 December 1995 (aged 28)	169	(Belgium) Racing
27	FW	Tom Boon	25 January 1990 (aged 34)	348	(Belgium) Léopold
29	DF	Maxime Van Oost	2 December 1999 (aged 24)	45	(Belgium) Waterloo Ducks
30	FW	Nelson Onana	1 March 2000 (aged 24)	35	(Belgium) Braxgata
31	MF	Arno Van Dessel	3 July 2003 (aged 21)	34	(Belgium) Herakles

=== India ===
India announced their squad on 26 June 2024.

Head coach: (South Africa) Craig Fulton

No.	Pos.	Player	Date of birth (age)	Caps	Club
4	DF	Jarmanpreet Singh	18 July 1996 (aged 28)	106	(India) Income Tax
5	FW	Abhishek Nain	15 August 1999 (aged 24)	74	(India) Punjab National Bank
7	MF	Manpreet Singh	26 June 1992 (aged 32)	370	(India) Punjab Armed Police
8	MF	Hardik Singh	23 September 1998 (aged 25)	134	(India) Punjab Civil Secretariat
9	FW	Gurjant Singh	26 January 1995 (aged 29)	116	(India) Punjab Civil Secretariat
10	DF	Sanjay Rana	5 May 2001 (aged 23)	35	(India) Hockey Haryana
11	FW	Mandeep Singh	25 January 1995 (aged 29)	244	(India) Punjab Armed Police
13	DF	Harmanpreet Singh (Captain)	6 January 1996 (aged 28)	219	(India) Punjab Armed Police
14	FW	Lalit Upadhyay	1 December 1993 (aged 30)	168	(India) Uttar Pradesh Police
16	GK	P. R. Sreejesh	8 May 1988 (aged 36)	328	(India) Physical Education & Sports, Kerala
17	DF	Sumit Walmiki	20 December 1996 (aged 27)	134	(India) ONGC
21	MF	Shamsher Singh	29 July 1997 (aged 26)	95	(India) Punjab Armed Police
25	MF	Raj Kumar Pal	1 May 1998 (aged 26)	54	(India) CAGI
30	DF	Amit Rohidas	10 May 1993 (aged 31)	184	(India) Railway Sports Promotion Board
32	MF	Vivek Prasad	25 February 2000 (aged 24)	143	(India) Madhya Pradesh Police
34	FW	Sukhjeet Singh	5 December 1996 (aged 27)	70	(India) Punjab National Bank

Reserves:

- Nilakanta Sharma
- Jugraj Singh
- Krishan Pathak (GK)

=== Ireland ===
Ireland announced their squad on 24 June 2024.

Head coach: Mark Tumilty

No.	Pos.	Player	Date of birth (age)	Caps	Goals	Club
1	GK	David Harte	3 April 1988 (aged 36)	242	0	(Netherlands) SV Kampong
7	DF	Tim Cross	26 January 1991 (aged 33)	61	3	(England) Hampstead & Westminster
8	FW	John McKee	22 December 1996 (aged 27)	102	43	(Ireland) Banbridge
9	FW	Matthew Nelson	14 April 1998 (aged 26)	87	20	(Ireland) Lisnagarvey
10	DF	Daragh Walsh	27 August 1997 (aged 26)	104	8	(Belgium) Braxgata
15	DF	Kyle Marshall	10 July 1998 (aged 26)	52	0	(England) Old Georgians
16	DF	Shane O’Donoghue	24 November 1992 (aged 31)	234	222	(Ireland) Glennane
17	MF	Sean Murray (Captain)	5 May 1997 (aged 27)	140	37	(Belgium) Gantoise
19	DF	Peter McKibbin	19 March 1997 (aged 27)	48	0	(Ireland) Lisnagarvey
20	FW	Jeremy Duncan	2 August 1994 (aged 29)	117	26	(Ireland) Monkstown
22	MF	Michael Robson	18 April 1995 (aged 29)	162	17	(Ireland) Annadale
24	FW	Benjamin Walker	13 July 1999 (aged 25)	92	34	(Belgium) La Gantoise
25		Jonathan Lynch	4 May 2001 (aged 23)	42		
26	MF	Peter Brown	7 July 1994 (aged 30)	43	4	(Ireland) Banbridge
29	DF	Lee Cole	21 February 1995 (aged 29)	124	32	(Ireland) Monkstown
40	FW	Ben Johnson	1 August 2000 (aged 23)	38	10	(Ireland) Three Rock Rovers
45	DF	Nicholas Page	28 May 1997 (aged 27)	53	0	(England) Oxted

Reserves:

- Alistair Empey
- Jamie Carr (GK)

=== New Zealand ===
New Zealand announced their final squad on 18 June 2024.

Head coach: (South Africa) Greg Nicol

No.	Pos.	Player	Date of birth (age)	Caps	Goals	Club
1	GK	Dominic Dixon	7 August 1996 (aged 27)	35	0	(England) Oxted
2	FW	Scott Boyde	5 August 1994 (aged 29)	29	7	(Australia) Eastern Suburbs
4	DF	Dane Lett	29 August 1990 (aged 33)	128	5	(New Zealand) Wellington
6	FW	Simon Child	16 April 1988 (aged 36)	306	146	(New Zealand) Auckland
8	DF	Charlie Morrison	20 July 2003 (aged 21)	23	0	(New Zealand) Marist
11	FW	Jacob Smith	3 April 1991 (aged 33)	126	34	(New Zealand) AISC
12	FW	Samuel Lane	30 April 1997 (aged 27)	110	39	(Netherlands) Oranje-Rood
13	DF	Simon Yorston	7 March 2000 (aged 24)	25	0	(New Zealand) Hornby
17	MF	Nicholas Woods (captain)	26 August 1995 (aged 28)	173	24	(Germany) Hamburg
18		Bradley Read	4 February 1995 (aged 29)	62	0	(New Zealand)
19	MF	Joseph Morrison	4 October 2001 (aged 22)	31	1	(New Zealand) Marist
21	DF	Kane Russell	22 April 1992 (aged 32)	210	89	(Germany) Hamburg
22	DF	Blair Tarrant	11 May 1990 (aged 34)	266	6	(New Zealand) Howick
24	MF	Sean Findlay	5 December 2001 (aged 22)	47	5	(Netherlands) Oranje-Rood
29	FW	Hugo Inglis	18 January 1991 (aged 33)	260	75	(Germany) Hamburg
31	MF	Hayden Phillips	6 February 1998 (aged 26)	133	12	(England) Holcombe
34	DF	Malachi Buschl	15 October 1999 (aged 24)	34		(Germany) Hamburg
37	MF	Isaac Houlbrooke	6 September 2001 (aged 22)	28	5	(New Zealand) ABC

Reserves:

- Leon Hayward (GK)
