= 2018 Men's International Hockey Open =

Tournament details
- Host country: Australia
- City: Darwin
- Dates: 18 – 22 September 2018
- Teams: 4
- Venue: Marrara Hockey Centre

Final positions
- Champions: Argentina (1st title)
- Runner-up: Australia
- Third place: Malaysia

Tournament statistics
- Matches played: 8
- Goals scored: 33 (4.13 per match)
- Top scorer: (Australia) Dylan Wotherspoon (4 goals)

The 2018 Men's International Hockey Open was a men's field hockey tournament which took place from 18 to 22 September 2018 in the Marrara Hockey Centre in Darwin, Australia. A total of four teams competed for the title.

== Teams ==
A total of four teams competed for the title:

Argentina

Head coach: Germán Orozco

1. Juan Manuel Vivaldi (GK)
4. Juan Ignacio Gilardi
5. Pedro Ibarra (C)
8. Nahuel Salis
9. Maico Casella
10. Matías Paredes
13. Leandro Tolini
16. Ignacio Ortíz
17. Juan Martín López
20. Isidoro Ibarra
21. Tomás Santiago (GK)
22. Matías Rey
24. Nicolás Cicileo
26. Agustín Mazzilli
27. Lucas Rossi
29. Tomás Domene
30. Agustín Bugallo
32. Martín Ferreiro
Australia

Head coach: Colin Batch

2. Thomas Craig
3. Corey Weyer
4. Jake Harvie
6. Matthew Dawson
9. Jacob Anderson
10. Joshua Beltz
11. Edward Ockenden (C)
15. Joshua Simmonds
16. Timothy Howard
17. Aran Zalewski (C)
20. Matthew Swann
21. Jack Welch
22. Flynn Ogilvie
23. Daniel Beale
24. Tyler Lovell (GK)
26. Dylan Wotherspoon
27. Kieran Govers
29. Timothy Brand
30. Andrew Charter (GK)
32. Jeremy Hayward
Japan

Head coach: Siegfried Aikman

1. Koji Yamasaki
2. Riku Tamura
3. Miyu Tanimitsu
4. Genki Mitani
5. Seren Tanaka
7. Kazuma Murata
11. Kenji Kitazato
13. Manabu Yamashita (C)
16. Kota Ozawa
18. Yuri Arnould (GK)
19. Kazumasa Matsumoto
21. Hirotaka Wakuri
22. Kazuki Yoneda
25. Shota Yamada
26. Wataru Matsumoto
29. Hirotaka Zendana
30. Takashi Yoshikawa (GK)
32. Yoshiki Kirishita
Malaysia

Head coach: Amin Rahim

1. Haziq Samsul
2. Najib Hassan
3. Norsyafiq Sumantri
7. Fitri Saari
8. Ashran Hamsani
9. Joel van Huizen
11. Syed Cholan
13. Firhan Ashari
14. Amirol Arshad
17. Razie Rahim (C)
18. Faiz Jali
19. Azri Hassan
20. Azuan Hasan
21. Hafizuddin Othman (GK)
24. Aizman Rozemi
26. Shahril Saabah
29. Hairi Rahman (GK)

== Results ==
=== Pool matches ===
Pos	Team	Pld	W	D	L	GF	GA	GD	Pts	Qualification
1	Argentina	3	3	0	0	7	3	+4	9	Final
2	Australia (H)	3	2	0	1	8	4	+4	6	Final
3	Malaysia	3	0	1	2	7	11	−4	1	
4	Japan	3	0	1	2	4	8	−4	1	

Source: FIH
Rules for classification: 1) points; 2) goal difference; 3) goals scored; 4) head-to-head result.
(H) Hosts

18 September 2018
17:00

Argentina	2–1	Japan
Casella 2'; Ferreiro 56'	Report	Yamasaki 58'

Marrara Hockey Centre
Umpires:
Raghu Prasad (IND)
Nor Azhar Abiddin (MAS)

18 September 2018
19:00

Australia	5–2	Malaysia
Wotherspoon 8'; Craig 11'; Anderson 32'; Welch 34'; Brand 60'	Report	Haziq 18'; Firhan 54'

Marrara Hockey Centre
Umpires:
Hideyuki Takahashi (JPN)
Diego Barbas (ARG)

19 September 2018
17:00

Malaysia	3–3	Japan
Razie 15', 21'; Fitri 27'	Report	Murata 11'; Tanaka 45'; Yamada 59'

Marrara Hockey Centre
Umpires:
Diego Barbas (ARG)
Adam Kearns (AUS)

19 September 2018
19:00

Argentina	2–0	Australia
Casella 44'; Mazzilli 45'	Report

Marrara Hockey Centre
Umpires:
Raghu Prasad (IND)
Nor Azhar Abiddin (MAS)

21 September 2018
17:00

Malaysia	2–3	Argentina
Haziq 9'; Fitri 51'	Report	Domene 33'; Ferreiro 52'; P. Ibarra 60'

Marrara Hockey Centre
Umpires:
Adam Kearns (AUS)
Hideyuki Takahashi (JPN)

21 September 2018
19:00

Australia	3–0	Japan
Wotherspoon 9', 30', 47'	Report

Marrara Hockey Centre
Umpires:
Diego Barbas (ARG)
Nor Azhar Abiddin (MAS)

=== Classification matches ===
==== Third and fourth place ====
22 September 2018
17:00

Malaysia	4–0	Japan
Shahril 15'; Azri 37'; Haziq 37'; Razie 44'	Report

Marrara Hockey Centre
Umpires:
Diego Barbas (ARG)
Adam Kearns (AUS)

==== Final ====
22 September 2018
19:30

Argentina	2–1	Australia
Paredes 24'; P. Ibarra 37'	Report	Govers 19'

Marrara Hockey Centre
Umpires:
Raghu Prasad (IND)
Hideyuki Takahashi (JPN)

== Statistics ==
=== Final standings ===
As per statistical convention in field hockey, matches decided in extra time are counted as wins and losses, while matches decided by penalty shoot-outs are counted as draws.

Pos	Team	Pld	W	D	L	GF	GA	GD	Pts	Final Result
1st place, gold medalist(s)	Argentina	4	4	0	0	9	4	+5	12	Gold Medal
2nd place, silver medalist(s)	Australia	4	2	0	2	9	6	+3	6	Silver Medal
3rd place, bronze medalist(s)	Malaysia	4	1	1	2	11	11	0	4	Bronze Medal
4	Japan	4	0	1	3	4	12	−8	1	

Source: FIH

=== Goalscorers ===
There were 33 goals scored in 8 matches, for an average of 4.12 goals per match.

4 goals

- (Australia) Dylan Wotherspoon

3 goals

- (Malaysia) Razie Rahim
- (Malaysia) Haziq Samsul

2 goals

- (Argentina) Maico Casella
- (Argentina) Martín Ferreiro
- (Argentina) Pedro Ibarra
- (Malaysia) Fitri Saari

1 goal

- (Argentina) Tomás Domene
- (Argentina) Agustín Mazzilli
- (Argentina) Matías Paredes
- (Australia) Jacob Anderson
- (Australia) Timothy Brand
- (Australia) Thomas Craig
- (Australia) Kieran Govers
- (Australia) Jack Welch
- (Japan) Kazuma Murata
- (Japan) Seren Tanaka
- (Japan) Shota Yamada
- (Japan) Koji Yamasaki
- (Malaysia) Firhan Ashaari
- (Malaysia) Azri Hassan
- (Malaysia) Shahril Saabah

Source: FIH

== See also ==
- Hockey Australia
- International Hockey Federation
