= Catalina Labake =

Argentine field hockey player

Personal information
- Born: 5 June 1998 (age 28) Buenos Aires, Argentina
- Height: 166 cm (5 ft 5 in)
- Weight: 61 kg (134 lb)

Sport
- Sport: Field hockey
- Position: Defender/Midfielder
- Club: GEBA
National team
Years	Team	Caps	Goals
2018-2019	Argentina	4	-
Medal record
South American Games
Gold medal – first place	2018 Cochabamba

Catalina Labake (born 5 June 1998) is an Argentinian field hockey player.

== Hockey career ==
In 2018, Labake took part of the team that won the 2018 South American Games.
