= Bugallo =

Bugallo is a Galician surname.

Notable people with the surname include:

- Agustín Bugallo (born 1995), Argentine field hockey player
- Celso Bugallo (1947–2025), Spanish actor
