= Habif =

Habif is a surname. Notable people with the surname include:

- Agustina Habif (born 1992), Argentine field hockey player
- Florencia Habif (born 1993), Argentine field hockey player
- Thomas Habif (born 1996), Argentine field hockey player
