= Tomás Bettaglio =

Argentine field hockey player

Personal information
- Born: 23 September 1991 (age 34) Buenos Aires, Argentina
- Height: 1.75 m (5 ft 9 in)
- Weight: 75 kg (165 lb)

Sport
- Sport: Field hockey
- Position: Forward
- Club: Banco Provincia
National team
Years	Team	Caps	Goals
2014–	Argentina	24	-
Medal record
Men's field hockey
Representing Argentina
South American Games
Gold medal – first place	2018 Cochabamaba	Team
- Updated on 11 June 2019

Tomás Bettaglio (born 23 September 1991) is an Argentine field hockey player for who plays as a forward for Banco Provincia and the Argentine national team.

He represented Argentina at the 2018 Men's Hockey World Cup.
