= Diego Paz =

Argentine field hockey player

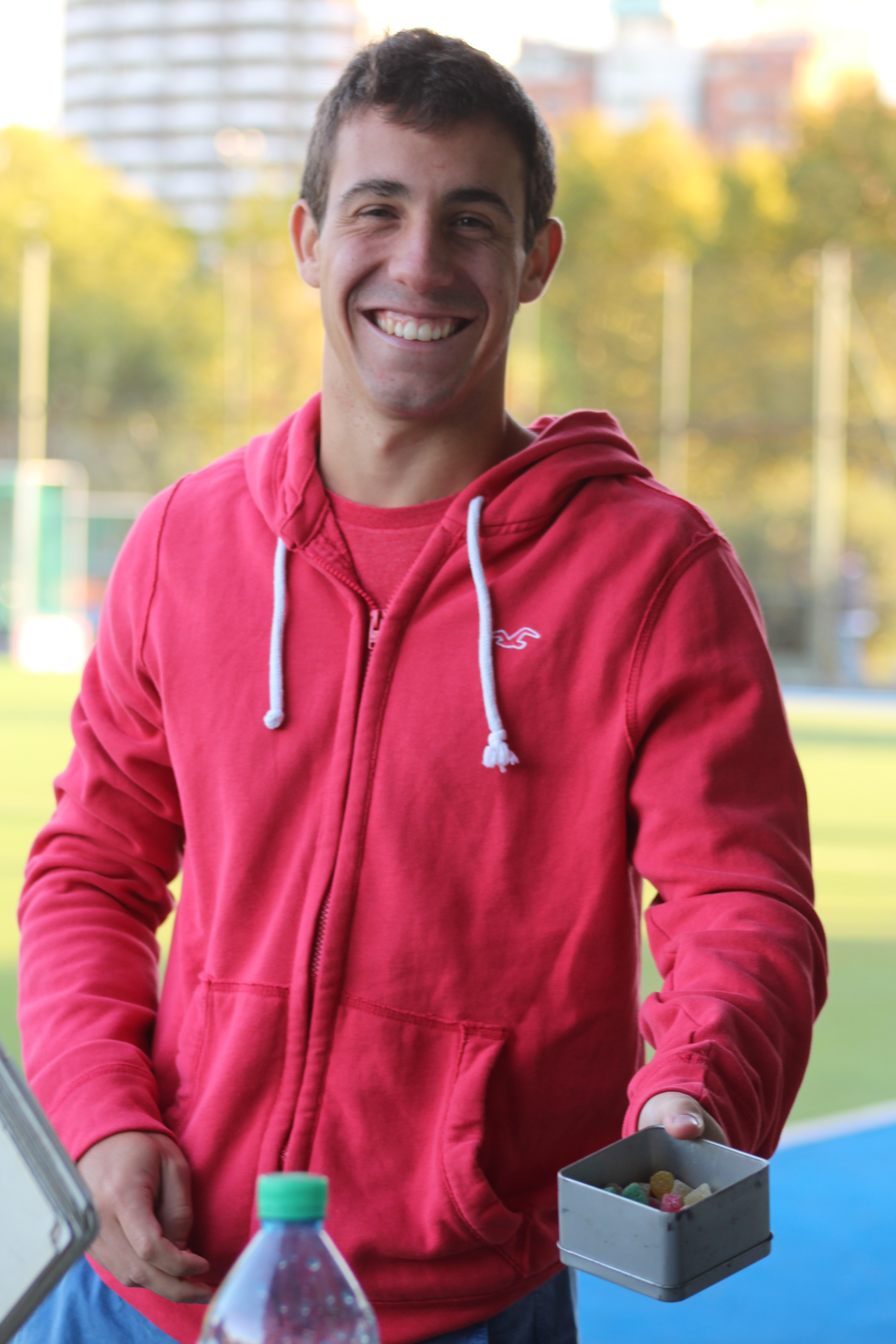

Personal information
- Full name: Diego Ignacio Paz
- Born: 10 August 1992 (age 33)
- Height: 1.70 m (5 ft 7 in)
- Weight: 69 kg (152 lb)

Sport
- Sport: Field hockey
- Position: Midfielder
- Club: Lille
Senior career
Years	Team	Caps	Goals
–2019	Ciudad	-	-
2019–2020	Klein Zwitserland	-	-
2020–2021	Ciudad	-	-
2021–present	Lille	-	-
National team
Years	Team	Caps	Goals
2014–present	Argentina	39	(1)
Medal record
Men's field hockey
Representing Argentina
Pan American Cup
Gold medal – first place	2022 Santiago
Hockey World League
Silver medal – second place	2016–17 Bhubaneswar	Team
Pan American Junior Championship
Gold medal – first place	2012 Guadalajara
- Updated on 23 October 2021

Diego Ignacio Paz (born 10 August 1992) is an Argentine field hockey player who plays as a midfielder for French Club Lille and the Argentine national team.

He represented Argentina at the 2020 Summer Olympics.

== Club career ==
During the 2019–20 season he played for Klein Zwitserland in the Dutch Hoofdklasse. After the 2020 Summer Olympics he joined French club Lille.
