= 2016–17 Men's FIH Hockey World League Final =

Field hockey tournament in Bhubaneswar, India

Tournament details
- Host country: India
- City: Bhubaneswar
- Dates: 1–10 December
- Teams: 8 (from 4 confederations)
- Venue: Kalinga Stadium

Final positions
- Champions: Australia (2nd title)
- Runner-up: Argentina
- Third place: India

Tournament statistics
- Matches played: 22
- Goals scored: 80 (3.64 per match)
- Top scorer: (Belgium) Loïck Luypaert (8 goals)
- Best player: (Germany) Mats Grambusch

The 2016–17 Men's FIH Hockey World League Final was the final stage of the 2016–17 edition of the Men's FIH Hockey World League. It took place between 1 and 10 December 2017 in Bhubaneswar, India.

Australia won the tournament for a record second time after defeating Argentina 2–1 in the final match. India won the third place match by defeating Germany 2–1.

== Qualification ==
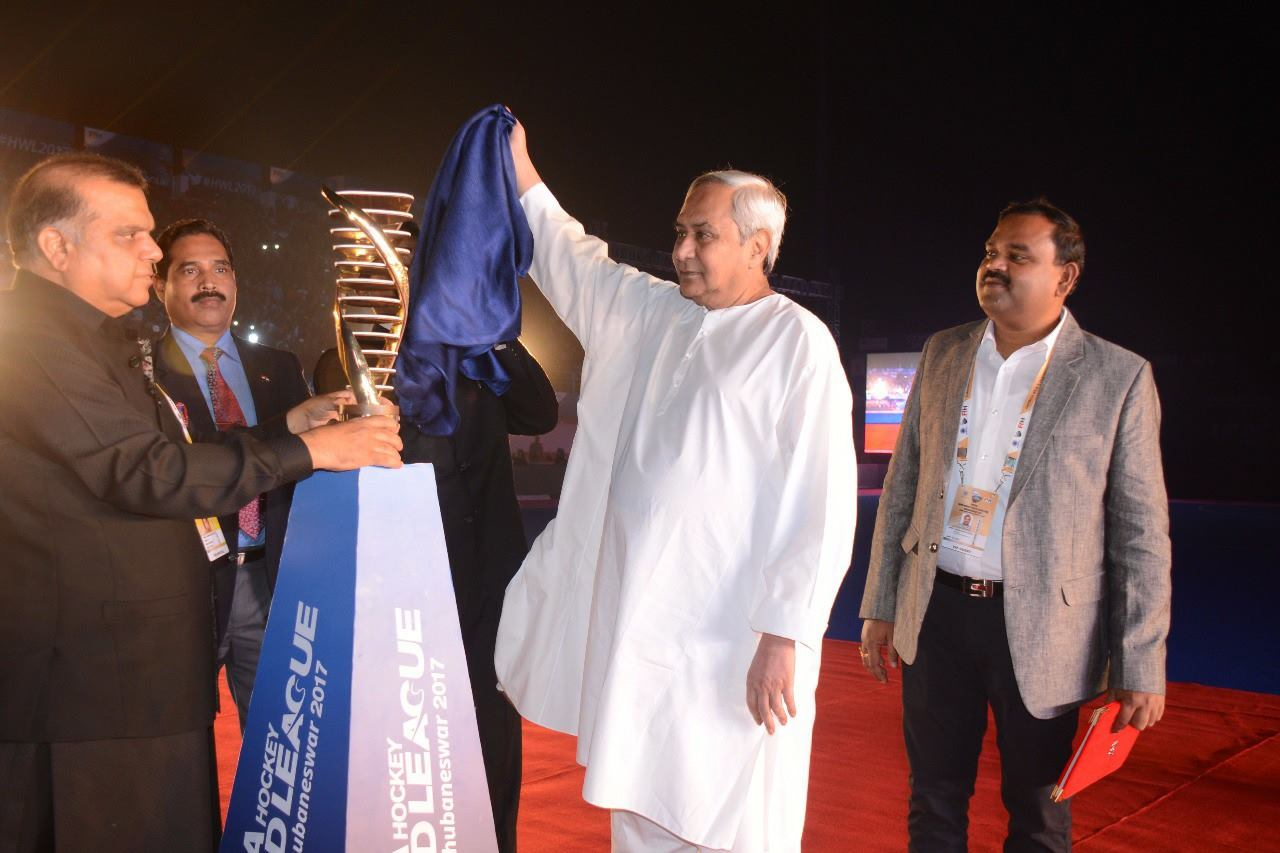
Odisha's Chief Minister Naveen Patnaik Unveiling the Trophy

The host nation qualified automatically in addition to seven teams qualified from the Semifinals. The following eight teams, shown with final pre-tournament rankings, competed in this round of the tournament.

Dates	Event	Location	Quotas	Qualifier(s)
	Host nation		1	India (6)
15–25 June 2017	2016–17 FIH Hockey World League Semifinals	London, England	7	Netherlands (4); Argentina (1); England (7)
8–23 July 2017	2016–17 FIH Hockey World League Semifinals	Johannesburg, South Africa	7	Belgium (3); Germany (5); Australia (2); Spain (9)
Total			8	

== Results ==
All times are local (UTC+5:30).

=== First round ===
==== Pool A ====
Pos	Team	Pld	W	D	L	GF	GA	GD	Pts	Qualification
1	Belgium	3	3	0	0	11	2	+9	9	Quarter-finals
2	Spain	3	2	0	1	5	8	−3	6	Quarter-finals
3	Argentina	3	0	1	2	6	8	−2	1	Quarter-finals
4	Netherlands	3	0	1	2	5	9	−4	1	Quarter-finals

Source: FIH
Rules for classification: 1) points; 2) goal difference; 3) goals scored; 4) head-to-head result.

2 December 2017
12:00

Argentina	2–3	Belgium
Casella 52'; Peillat 57'	Report	Luypaert 9'; Keusters 51'; Boon 56'

Umpires:
Dan Barstow (ENG)
Ben de Young (AUS)

2 December 2017
14:00

Netherlands	2–3	Spain
Balk 37'; Pruyser 55'	Report	Quemada 15+'; González 35'; Arana 39'

Umpires:
Javed Shaikh (IND)
Ben Göntgen (GER)

3 December 2017
17:30

Belgium	5–0	Spain
Van Aubel 3'; Luypaert 38', 57', 59'; Charlier 58'	Report

Umpires:
Marcin Grochal (POL)
Rana Anbanathan (MAS)

3 December 2017
19:30

Netherlands	3–3	Argentina
Brinkman 12'; Verga 37'; Pruyser 55'	Report	Rey 45'; Vila 50'; Peillat 59'

Umpires:
Martin Madden (SCO)
Chen Dekang (CHN)

5 December 2017
17:30

Argentina	1–2	Spain
Paredes 21'	Report	Quemada 50'; Romeu 59'

Umpires:
Ben de Young (AUS)
Ben Göntgen (GER)

5 December 2017
19:30

Belgium	3–0	Netherlands
Luypaert 19', 30+'; Boon 32'	Report

Umpires:
Javed Shaikh (IND)
Dan Barstow (ENG)

==== Pool B ====
Pos	Team	Pld	W	D	L	GF	GA	GD	Pts	Qualification
1	Germany	3	2	1	0	6	2	+4	7	Quarter-finals
2	England	3	1	1	1	5	6	−1	4	Quarter-finals
3	Australia	3	0	3	0	5	5	0	3	Quarter-finals
4	India (H)	3	0	1	2	3	6	−3	1	Quarter-finals

Source: FIH
Rules for classification: 1) points; 2) goal difference; 3) goals scored; 4) head-to-head result.
(H) Hosts

1 December 2017
16:45

Germany	2–0	England
Grambusch 19'; Rühr 25'	Report

Umpires:
Rana Anbanathan (MAS)
Eduardo Lizana (ESP)

1 December 2017
19:30

Australia	1–1	India
Hayward 21'	Report	Mandeep 20'

Umpires:
Marcin Grochal (POL)
Diego Barbas (ARG)

2 December 2017
17:30

Germany	2–2	Australia
Miltkau 7'; Häner 58'	Report	Govers 39'; Kleinschmidt 49'

Umpires:
Sean Rapaport (RSA)
Martin Madden (SCO)

2 December 2017
19:30

India	2–3	England
Akashdeep 47'; Rupinder 50'	Report	Goodfield 25'; Ward 43', 57'

Umpires:
Diego Barbas (ARG)
Chen Dekang (CHN)

4 December 2017
17:30

Australia	2–2	England
Wotherspoon 33'; Govers 41'	Report	Ansell 4'; Roper 54'

Umpires:
Marcin Grochal (POL)
Sean Rapaport (RSA)

4 December 2017
19:30

India	0–2	Germany
	Report	Häner 17'; Grambusch 20'

Umpires:
Eduardo Lizana (ESP)
Martin Madden (SCO)

=== Second round ===
Quarter-finals
6 December
Belgium	3 (2)
India (p.s.o.)	3 (3)
7 December
England	2
Argentina	3
6 December
Spain	1
Australia	4
7 December
Germany (p.s.o.)	3 (4)
Netherlands	3 (3)

Semi-finals
8 December
India	0
Argentina	1
9 December
Australia	3
Germany	0

Final
10 December
Argentina	1
Australia	2
Third place
10 December
India	2
Germany	1

==== Quarter-finals ====
6 December 2017
17:15

Spain	1–4	Australia
Garcia 20'	Report	Hayward 28'; Kleinschmidt 48'; Govers 50', 50'

Umpires:
Diego Barbas (ARG)
Chen Dekang (CHN)

6 December 2017
19:30

Belgium	3–3	India
Luypaert 39', 46'; Keusters 53'	Report	Gurjant 31'; Harmanpreet 35'; Rupinder 46'
Penalties
Boccard (penalty shoot-out missed); Stockbroekx (penalty shoot-out missed); Wegnez (penalty shoot-out missed); Van Doren (penalty shoot-out scored); Van Aubel (penalty shoot-out scored); Van Doren (penalty shoot-out missed)	2–3	(penalty shoot-out missed) Harmanpreet; (penalty shoot-out scored) Lalit; (penalty shoot-out scored) Rupinder; (penalty shoot-out missed) Sumit; (penalty shoot-out missed) Akashdeep; (penalty shoot-out scored) Harmanpreet

Umpires:
Ben Göntgen (GER)
Rana Anbanathan (MAS)

7 December 2017
17:15

England	2–3	Argentina
Condon 29'; Dixon 60'	Report	Vila 21'; Paredes 29'; Gilardi 34'

Umpires:
Javed Shaikh (IND)
Eduardo Lizana (ESP)

7 December 2017
19:30

Germany	3–3	Netherlands
Meyer 12'; Fuchs 34'; Staib 41'	Report	Pruyser 21', 60'; Kellerman 27'
Penalties
Fuchs (penalty shoot-out missed); Grambusch (penalty shoot-out scored); Miltkau (penalty shoot-out scored); Linnekogel (penalty shoot-out scored); Rühr (penalty shoot-out scored)	4–3	(penalty shoot-out missed) Bakker; (penalty shoot-out scored) Pruyser; (penalty shoot-out missed) Kemperman; (penalty shoot-out scored) Van Ass; (penalty shoot-out scored) Kellerman

Umpires:
Marcin Grochal (POL)
Dan Barstow (ENG)

==== Fifth to eighth place classification ====
The losing quarterfinalists are ranked according to their first-round results to determine the fixtures for the fifth to eighth place classification matches.

Pos	Team	Pld	W	D	L	GF	GA	GD	Pts
1	Belgium	3	3	0	0	11	2	+9	9
2	Spain	3	2	0	1	5	8	−3	6
3	England	3	1	1	1	5	5	0	4
4	Netherlands	3	0	1	2	5	9	−4	1

Rules for classification: 1) points; 2) goal difference; 3) goals scored.

===== Seventh place game =====
8 December 2017
17:15

England	0–1	Netherlands
	Report	Pruyser 42'

Umpires:
Sean Rapaport (RSA)
Chen Dekang (CHN)

===== Fifth place game =====
9 December 2017
17:15

Belgium	1–0	Spain
Dockier 4'	Report

Umpires:
Ben de Young (AUS)
Javed Shaikh (IND)

==== First to fourth place classification ====
===== Semi-finals =====
8 December 2017
19:30

India	0–1	Argentina
	Report	Peillat 17'

Umpires:
Rana Anbanathan (MAS)
Ben Göntgen (GER)

9 December 2017
19:30

Australia	3–0	Germany
Wothersoon 42'; Hayward 48'; Wickham 60'	Report

Umpires:
Martin Madden (SCO)
Diego Barbas (ARG)

===== Third place game =====
10 December 2017
17:15

India	2–1	Germany
Sunil 21'; Harmanpreet 54'	Report	Appel 36'

Umpires:
Dan Barstow (ENG)
Eduardo Lizana (ESP)

===== Final =====
10 December 2017
19:30

Argentina	1–2	Australia
Bugallo 17'	Report	Hayward 17'; Govers 58'

Umpires:
Martin Madden (SCO)
Marcin Grochal (POL)

== Statistics ==
=== Final ranking ===
Rank	Team
1st place, gold medalist(s)	Australia
2nd place, silver medalist(s)	Argentina
3rd place, bronze medalist(s)	India
4	Germany
5	Belgium
6	Spain
7	Netherlands
8	England

=== Awards ===
The following individual awards were given at the conclusion of the tournament.

Top Goalscorer	Player of the Tournament	Goalkeeper of the Tournament	Young Player of the Tournament
(Belgium) Loïck Luypaert	(Germany) Mats Grambusch	(Argentina) Juan Manuel Vivaldi	(Belgium) Victor Wegnez

=== Goalscorers ===
There were 80 goals scored in 22 matches, for an average of 3.64 goals per match.

8 goals

- (Belgium) Loïck Luypaert

5 goals

- (Australia) Blake Govers
- (Netherlands) Mirco Pruyser

4 goals

- (Australia) Jeremy Hayward

3 goals

- (Argentina) Gonzalo Peillat

2 goals

- (Argentina) Matías Paredes
- (Argentina) Lucas Vila
- (Australia) Dylan Wotherspoon
- (Australia) Aaron Kleinschmidt
- (Belgium) Tom Boon
- (Belgium) Amaury Keusters
- (England) Samuel Ward
- (Germany) Mats Grambusch
- (Germany) Martin Häner
- (India) Rupinder Pal Singh
- (India) Harmanpreet Singh
- (Spain) Pau Quemada

1 goal

- (Argentina) Agustín Bugallo
- (Argentina) Maico Casella
- (Argentina) Juan Ignacio Gilardi
- (Argentina) Matías Rey
- (Australia) Tom Wickham
- (Belgium) Cédric Charlier
- (Belgium) Sébastien Dockier
- (Belgium) Florent van Aubel
- (England) Liam Ansell
- (England) David Condon
- (England) Adam Dixon
- (England) David Goodfield
- (England) Phil Roper
- (Germany) Mark Appel
- (Germany) Florian Fuchs
- (Germany) Julius Meyer
- (Germany) Marco Miltkau
- (Germany) Christopher Rühr
- (Germany) Constantin Staib
- (India) Akashdeep Singh
- (India) Gurjant Singh
- (India) S.V. Sunil
- (India) Mandeep Singh
- (Netherlands) Lars Balk
- (Netherlands) Thierry Brinkman
- (Netherlands) Bjorn Kellerman
- (Netherlands) Valentin Verga
- (Spain) Diego Arana
- (Spain) Marc Garcia
- (Spain) Enrique González
- (Spain) Josep Romeu

Source: FIH

== See also ==
- 2016–17 Women's FIH Hockey World League Final
