= Tobías Martins =

Argentine field hockey player

Personal information
- Full name: Tobías Jesús Martins
- Born: 14 July 1998 (age 28) Buenos Aires, Argentina

Sport
- Sport: Field hockey
- Position: Forward
Senior career
Years	Team	Caps	Goals
–	Uhlenhorster	-	-
National team
Years	Team	Caps	Goals
2022–	Argentina	27	(10)
Medal record
Men's field hockey
Representing Argentina
South American Games
Gold medal – first place	2022 Asunción	Team

Tobías Jesús Martins (born July 14, 1998) is an Argentine field hockey player.

== Early life ==
Tobías Martins was born on 14 July 1998, in Buenos Aires, Argentina.

== Career ==
=== Domestic league ===
In the German Bundesliga, Martins represents Uhlenhorster.

=== Los Leones ===
Martins received his first call-up to the Los Leones squad in 2022. He made his senior international debut at during season three of the FIH Pro League

Since his debut, Martins has been a constant inclusion in the national program. He has appeared in three seasons of the FIH Pro League, as well as being a reserve player at the 2022 Pan American Cup in Santiago. In 2022 he won his first medal at a major tournament, taking home gold at the South American Games in Asunción.

On 7 June 2024, he was named as a travelling reserve for the XXXIII Summer Olympics in Paris.

==== International goals ====
Goal	Date	Location	Opponent	Score	Result	Competition	Ref.
1	16 April 2022	CeNARD, Buenos Aires, Argentina	France	1–0	4–2	2021–22 FIH Pro League	
2	16 April 2022	CeNARD, Buenos Aires, Argentina	France	4–2	4–2	2021–22 FIH Pro League	
3	3 October 2022	Parque Olímpico, Asunción, Paraguay	Uruguay	6–0	17–0	2022 South American Games	
4	3 October 2022	Parque Olímpico, Asunción, Paraguay	Uruguay	9–0	17–0	2022 South American Games	
5	5 October 2022	Parque Olímpico, Asunción, Paraguay	Peru	2–0	17–0	2022 South American Games	
6	5 October 2022	Parque Olímpico, Asunción, Paraguay	Peru	13–0	17–0	2022 South American Games	
7	5 October 2022	Parque Olímpico, Asunción, Paraguay	Peru	16–0	17–0	2022 South American Games	
8	9 October 2022	Parque Olímpico, Asunción, Paraguay	Brazil	6–0	12–0	2022 South American Games	
9	9 October 2022	Parque Olímpico, Asunción, Paraguay	Brazil	11–0	12–0	2022 South American Games	
10	28 February 2023	Tasmanian Hockey Centre, Hobart, Australia	Australia	2–2	2–2	2022–23 FIH Pro League	
