= Juan Ignacio Gilardi =

Argentine field hockey player

Personal information
- Born: 14 November 1981 (age 44) San Fernando, Argentina
- Height: 1.87 m (6 ft 2 in)
- Weight: 91 kg (201 lb)

Sport
- Sport: Field hockey
- Position: Defender
Senior career
Years	Team	Caps	Goals
–	San Fernando	-	-
National team
Years	Team	Caps	Goals
2007–2018	Argentina	174	-
Coaching career
- 2023–present: Argentina under-21
Medal record
Men's field hockey
Representing Argentina
Olympic Games
Gold medal – first place	2016 Rio de Janeiro	Team
World Cup
Bronze medal – third place	2014 The Hague
Pan American Games
Gold medal – first place	2015 Toronto	Team
Silver medal – second place	2007 Rio de Janeiro	Team
Pan American Cup
Gold medal – first place	2013 Brampton
Gold medal – first place	2017 Lancaster
Bronze medal – third place	2009 Santiago
Champions Trophy
Bronze medal – third place	2008 Rotterdam
Hockey World League
Silver medal – second place	2016–17 Bhubaneswar	Team
South American Games
Gold medal – first place	2014 Santiago	Team
Junior World Cup
Silver medal – second place	2001 Hobart

Juan Ignacio Gilardi (born 14 November 1981) is an Argentine retired field hockey player who played as a defender for the Argentine national team.

He was part of the Argentine team that won gold in men's field hockey at the 2016 Summer Olympics in Rio de Janeiro. Although Gilardi would have liked to have continued playing for the national team in 2019, the head coach Germán Orozco, told him he would not be selected for the national team anymore. So the 2018 World Cup was his last tournament for the national team.
