= Paul Revington =

South African field hockey coach

Paul Revington (born 6 September 1973) is a South African field hockey coach. He coached the South Africa national team at the 2004 Summer Olympics

He led England to a silver medal at the 2023 Men's EuroHockey Championship in Mönchengladbach and managed the Great Britain national team at the 2024 Summer Olympics. Revington quit his job as England and Great Britain men's coach in September 2024.
