= Santiago Tarazona =

Argentine field hockey player

Personal information
- Full name: Santiago Tomás Tarazona
- Born: 31 May 1996 (age 30) Buenos Aires, Argentina
- Height: 1.84 m (6 ft 0 in)
- Weight: 74 kg (163 lb)

Sport
- Sport: Field hockey
- Position: Defender / Midfielder
- Club: TSV Mannheim
Senior career
Years	Team	Caps	Goals
–2021	GEBA	-	-
2021–2022	Real Club de Polo	-	-
2022–2024	GEBA	-	-
2024–present	TSV Mannheim	-	-
National team
Years	Team	Caps	Goals
2015–2016	Argentina U21	18	(2)
2017–present	Argentina	125	(14)
Medal record
Men's field hockey
Representing Argentina
Pan American Games
Gold medal – first place	2023 Santiago	Team
Pan American Cup
Gold medal – first place	2017 Lancaster
Gold medal – first place	2022 Santiago
South American Games
Gold medal – first place	2022 Asunción	Team
Hockey World League
Silver medal – second place	2016–17 Bhubaneswar	Team
Pan American Junior Championship
Gold medal – first place	2016 Toronto
- Updated on 19 August 2024

Santiago Tomás Tarazona (born 31 May 1996) is an Argentine field hockey player who plays as a defender or midfielder for German Bundesliga club TSV Mannheim and the Argentine national team.

He represented Argentina at the 2020 and 2024 Summer Olympics.

== Club career ==
Tarazona started playing hockey at age eight. He played for GEBA until the 2020 Olympics when he joined Spanish División de Honor club Real Club de Polo in the summer of 2021. After one season, he returned to Argentina to prepare for the 2023 Men's FIH Hockey World Cup. He returned to Europe after the 2024 Summer Olympics to play for TSV Mannheim in the German Bundesliga.

== Honours ==
Argentina U21

- Pan American Junior Championship: 2016

Argentina

- Pan American Games gold medal: 2023
- Pan American Cup: 2017, 2022
- South American Games gold medal: 2022
