= Joshua Simmonds =

Australian field hockey player (born 1995)

Personal information
- Born: 4 October 1995 (age 30) Ringwood, Victoria, Australia

Sport
- Sport: Field hockey
- Position: Defender
- Club: Kew-Boxhill Hockey Club
Senior career
Years	Team	Caps	Goals
2014	NT Stingers	6	0
2015–2018	VIC Vikings	16	7
2019–	HC Melbourne	2	2
National team
Years	Team	Caps	Goals
2015–2016	Australia U–21	17	(2)
2018–	Australia	50	(4)
Medal record
Men's field hockey
Representing Australia
Olympic Games
Silver medal – second place	2020 Tokyo	Team
Commonwealth Games
Gold medal – first place	2022 Birmingham	Team
FIH Pro League
Gold medal – first place	2019 Amstelveen

Joshua Simmonds (born 4 October 1995) is a field hockey player from Australia.

== Personal life ==
Joshua Simmonds was born and raised in Ringwood, Victoria.

He is a member of the Victorian Institute of Sport, and has referenced Floyd Mayweather as his sporting hero.

== Career ==
=== Club level ===
At club level, Joshua Simmonds plays hockey for KBH Brumbies in the Victorian Premier League. He has also played for YMCA Coastal City Hockey Club in the Western Australia Premier Competition.

=== State level ===
Throughout his youth, Joshua Simmonds represented his home state, Victoria, in all domestic competitions.

In 2014, Simmonds was recruited by the NT Stingers in the Australian Hockey League as an import player. Following his AHL debut for the Northern Territory, Simmonds returned to play for the VIC Vikings from 2015 onwards. This included winning the championship at the 2016 edition.

Following the overhaul of the AHL in 2018, Simmonds was selected to represent HC Melbourne in Hockey Australia's new domestic league, Hockey One, in 2019.

=== National teams ===
==== Under–21 ====
Joshua Simmonds made his junior international debut for the Australia U–21 side in 2015, at the Sultan of Johor Cup, where the team finished fifth.

In 2016, Simmonds went on to represent the side again; at the Sultan of Johor Cup and Junior World Cup.

==== Kookaburras ====
Following two years in the national development squad, Simmonds made his senior international debut for the Kookaburras in 2018 during a test match against Argentina in Darwin, Northern Territory. He then went on the represent the team during the International Hockey Open. In November 2018, Simmonds was named in the Kookaburras squad for the 2019 calendar year.

Simmonds started 2019 in the Kookaburras team during the FIH Pro League in Melbourne, Victoria. Simmonds continued to represent the team during the Pro League, culminating with a gold medal in Amstelveen, following a 3–2 win over Belgium.

Simmonds was selected in the Kookaburras Olympics squad for the Tokyo 2020 Olympics. The team reached the final for the first time since 2004 but couldn't achieve gold, beaten by Belgium in a shootout.
