= Nicolás Acosta =

Argentine field hockey player (born 1996)

Personal information
- Full name: Nicolás Santiago Acosta
- Born: 7 July 1996 (age 30) Rosario, Argentina

Sport
- Sport: Field hockey
- Position: Midfield
Senior career
Years	Team	Caps	Goals
–	Jockey Club	-	-
National team
Years	Team	Caps	Goals
2016	Argentina U–21	12	(8)
2018–	Argentina	30	(6)
Medal record
Men's field hockey
Representing Argentina
South American Games
Gold medal – first place	2018 Cochabamba	Team
Gold medal – first place	2022 Asunción	Team
Pan American Junior Championship
Gold medal – first place	2016 Toronto	Team

Nicolás Santiago Acosta is an Argentine field hockey player.

== Early life ==
Nicolás Acosta was born on 7 July 1996, in Rosario, Santa Fe.

== Career ==
=== Under–21 ===
Acosta made his international debut at under-21 level, making his first appearance in 2016. He was a member of the gold medal-winning squad at the Pan American Junior Championship in Toronto. Later in the year he represented the team again at the FIH Junior World Cup in Lucknow.

=== Los Leones ===
Acosta received his first call-up to the Los Leones squad in 2018. He was a member of the squad that won gold at the South American Games in Cochabamba.

Since his debut, Acosta has regularly been included in international squads, appearing in three seasons of the FIH Pro League. In 2022 he won his second medal at a major tournament, taking home gold at his second South American Games from the tournament in Asunción.

==== International goals ====
Goal	Date	Location	Opponent	Score	Result	Competition	Ref.
1	2 June 2018	Estadio Félix Capriles, Cochabamba, Bolivia	Bolivia	3–0	12–0	2018 South American Games	
2	19 March 2022	Kalinga Stadium, Bhubaneswar, India	India	1–1	2–2	2021–22 FIH Pro League	
3	3 October 2022	Parque Olímpico, Asunción, Paraguay	Uruguay	5–0	17–0	2022 South American Games	
4	5 October 2022	Parque Olímpico, Asunción, Paraguay	Peru	7–0	17–0	2022 South American Games	
5	9 October 2022	Parque Olímpico, Asunción, Paraguay	Brazil	3–0	12–0	2022 South American Games	
6	9 October 2022	Parque Olímpico, Asunción, Paraguay	Brazil	7–0	12–0	2022 South American Games	
