= Tomás Santiago =

Argentine field hockey player

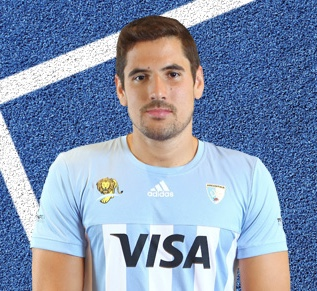

Personal information
- Full name: Tomás Matias Santiago
- Born: 15 June 1992 (age 34)
- Height: 1.82 m (6 ft 0 in)
- Weight: 86 kg (190 lb)

Sport
- Sport: Field hockey
- Position: Goalkeeper
- Club: Royal Herakles
Youth career
- Team
- –: Córdoba Athletic
Senior career
| Years | Team | Caps | Goals |
| –2017 | Club Ferrocarril Mitre | - | - |
| 2017–2023 | La Gantoise HC | - | - |
| 2023-present | Royal Herakles | - | - |
| 2024–present | Delhi SG Pipers | - | - |
National team
| Years | Team | Caps | Goals |
| 2014–present | Argentina | 57 | (0) |
Medal record
Men's field hockey
Representing Argentina
World Cup
| Bronze medal – third place | 2026 Wavre/Amstelveen |
Pan American Games
| Gold medal – first place | 2023 Santiago | Team |
Pan American Cup
| Gold medal – first place | 2022 Santiago |
| Gold medal – first place | 2025 Montevideo |
South American Games
| Gold medal – first place | 2018 Cochabamaba | Team |
Pan American Junior Championship
| Gold medal – first place | 2012 Guadalajara |
- Updated on 4 February 2023

Tomás Matias Santiago (born 15 June 1992) is an Argentine field hockey player who plays as a goalkeeper for Belgian Hockey League club Royal Herakles and the Argentina national team.

== Club career ==
Santiago started playing hockey at Córdoba Athletic and later emigrated to Buenos Aires and joined the ranks of Mitre. In 2016 he moved to Europe, he played for Havant Hockey Club in the England hockey league. MHC Malaysian Hockey League and after it he started playing for La Gantoise in Belgium. On 2023, He was Belgian champion with the Gantoise

== International career ==
He represented Argentina at the 2018 Men's Hockey World Cup and on the Hockey World Cup 2023 in India . And also he was reserve goalkeeper in the Olympic Games Rio 2016, where Argentine won the gold medal. He was also reserve goalkeeper in the Panamerican Games in Toronto 2015 and reserve goalkeeper in Panamerican Games in Lima 2019.
