= Lars Balk =

Dutch field hockey player

Personal information
- Born: 26 February 1996 (age 30) Vianen, Netherlands

Sport
- Sport: Field hockey
- Position: Defender / Midfielder
- Club: Kampong
Youth career
- Years: Team
- 2001–2008: MHC Vianen
- 2008–2014: Kampong
Senior career
Years	Team	Caps	Goals
2014–	Kampong	-	-
National team
Years	Team	Caps	Goals
2014–2017	Netherlands U21	15	(0)
2015	Netherlands (indoor)	12	(1)
2016–present	Netherlands	122	(3)
Medal record
Men's field hockey
Representing the Netherlands
Olympic Games
Gold medal – first place	2024 Paris	Team
World Cup
Silver medal – second place	2018 Bhubaneswar
Bronze medal – third place	2023 Bhubaneswar/Rourkela
European Championship
Gold medal – first place	2021 Amstelveen
Gold medal – first place	2023 Mönchengladbach
Silver medal – second place	2025 Mönchengladbach
Bronze medal – third place	2019 Antwerp
Champions Trophy
Bronze medal – third place	2018 Breda
EuroHockey Junior Championship
Gold medal – first place	2014 Waterloo
Gold medal – first place	2017 Valencia
Men's indoor hockey
Indoor World Cup
Gold medal – first place	2015 Leipzig

Lars Balk (Dutch pronunciation: [ˈlɑrz ˈbɑl(ə)k]; born 26 February 1996) is a Dutch professional field hockey player who plays as a defender or midfielder for Kampong and the Dutch national team.

== Club career ==
Balk started playing hockey at the age of five at his local hockey club MHC Vianen. When he was 12 years old and wanted to play on a higher level, he switched to Kampong. He made his debut for the first team of Kampong when he was 17 years old. Balk played in all four matches in the 2014–15 Euro Hockey League, where they were eliminated in the quarter-final. In his second Euro Hockey League, they reached the final and won the tournament.

== International career ==
Before Balk made his debut for the outdoor senior team, he played for the indoor team in the 2015 Indoor World Cup, where they won the gold medal. He made his debut for the senior national team in January 2016 in a test match against Argentina. After he was not selected in the 2017 EuroHockey Championship squad for the senior team, he played in the 2017 EuroHockey Junior Championship. Balk played in all seven matches in the 2018 World Cup and scored one goal. They eventually reached the final, where they lost to Belgium. In June 2019, he was selected in the Netherlands squad for the 2019 EuroHockey Championship. They won the bronze medal by defeating Germany 4–0.
