= Maximiliano Caldas =

Argentine field hockey player

Max Caldas
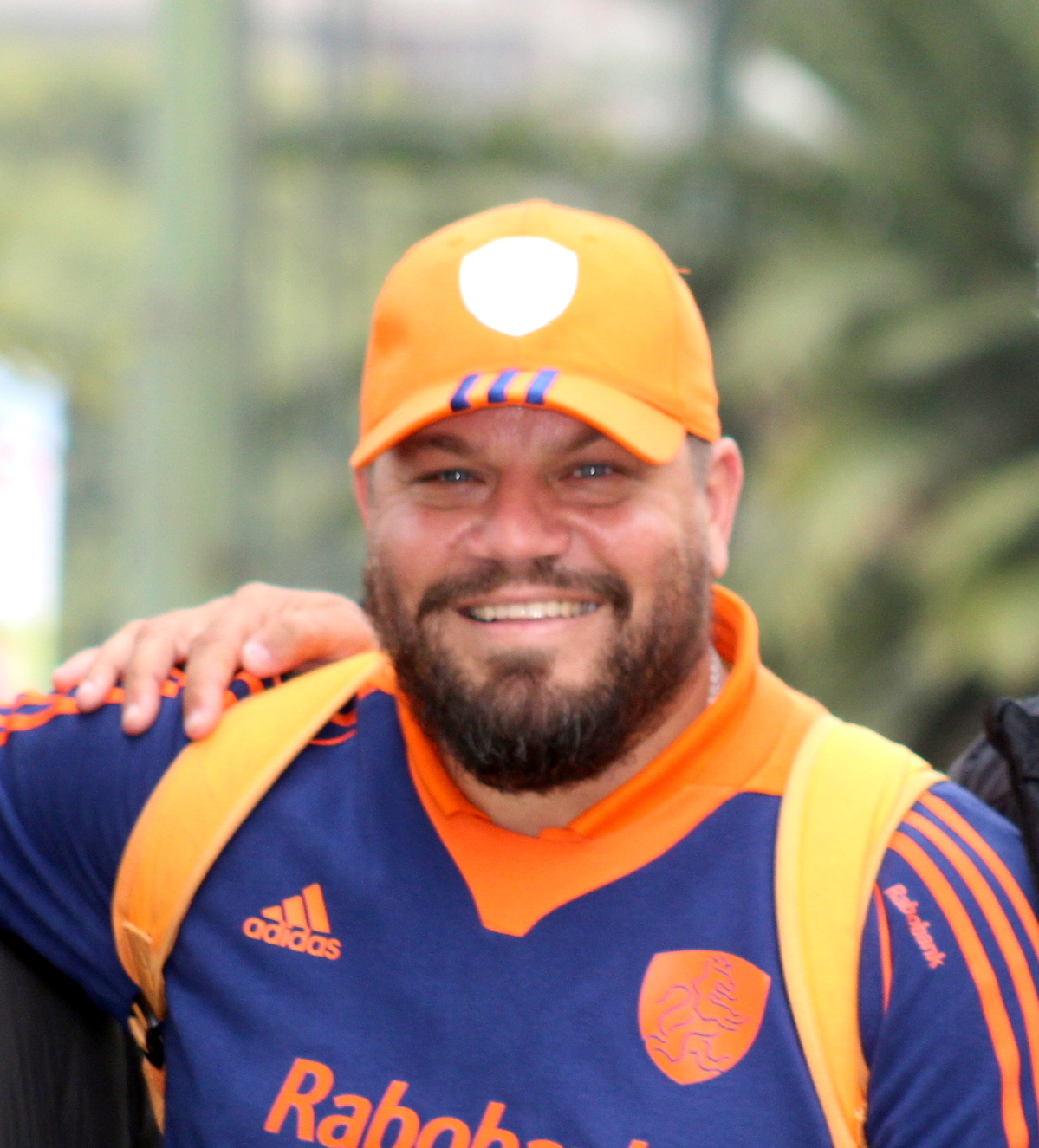

Personal information
- Full name: Maximiliano Jorge Caldas
- Born: 9 March 1973 (age 53) San Isidro, Buenos Aires, Argentina
- Height: 1.80 m (5 ft 11 in)
- Weight: 92 kg (203 lb)

Sport
- Country: Argentina
- Sport: Field hockey
- Team: Spain (coach)
Medal record
Champions Challenge
Bronze medal – third place	2001 Kuala Lumpur
Pan American Games
Gold medal – first place	1995 Mar del Plata	Team

Maximiliano Jorge "Max" Caldas (born 9 March 1973) is an Argentine field hockey defender, who made his debut for the national squad in 1994, and competed for his native country in the 1996 and 2004 Summer Olympics.

Caldas, the former husband of Australian field hockey Olympian Alyson Annan, played for four years in the Netherlands, at HC Klein Zwitserland, before retiring due to injury. He then started a career as a hockey coach. The first team he coached was Leiden Heren 1 (Men); he finished second in the Dutch 'eerste klasse' (1st class). Caldas coaches Amsterdam Dames 1 (Women) in the Dutch 'Hoofdklasse' (highest league) since the summer of 2006. Caldas was the assistant coach of the Dutch women's national team that became world champion on 8 October 2006 and captured the gold medal at the 2008 Summer Olympics in Beijing, China. Since 2010, Maximiliano Caldas is the Dutch women's national team coach. On the 2012 Olympics he won gold as a coach with the Dutch women's. They also grabbed the gold at the first edition of the Hockey World League in 2013. In June 2014 he won his third gold with the Dutch women at the Hockey World Cup in The Hague. He is now in charge of the Spanish men's hockey team.
