= Juan Catán =

Argentine field hockey player

Personal information
- Full name: Juan Ignacio Catán
- Born: 5 October 1995 (age 30) Buenos Aires, Argentina
- Height: 186 cm (6 ft 1 in)
- Weight: 83 kg (183 lb)

Sport
- Sport: Field hockey
- Position: Defence
Senior career
Years	Team	Caps	Goals
–	Hurling	-	-
National team
Years	Team	Caps	Goals
2015–2016	Argentina U–21	12	(0)
2018–	Argentina	79	(7)
Medal record
Men's field hockey
Representing Argentina
Pan American Games
Gold medal – first place	2023 Santiago	Team
South American Games
Gold medal – first place	2018 Cochabamba	Team
Gold medal – first place	2022 Asunción	Team
Pan American Junior Championship
Gold medal – first place	2016 Toronto	Team

Juan Ignacio Catán (born 5 October 1995) is an Argentine field hockey player.

In 2024 he will represent Argentina at the XXXIII Summer Olympics in France.

== Early life ==
Juan Catán was born on 5 October 1995, in Buenos Aires, Argentina.

== Career ==
=== Under–21 ===
Catán made his international debut at under-21 level, making his first appearance in 2015. He made his debut for the Argentine U–21 team at the Sultan of Johor Cup in Johor Bahru, where the team finished fourth.

The following year he represented the junior national team again, winning gold at the Pan American Junior Championship in Toronto.

=== Los Leones ===
Catán received his first call-up to the Los Leones squad in 2018. He made his senior international debut at the South American Games in Cochabamba, where he won a gold medal.

Throughout his career, Catán has been a regular inclusion in national squads. He has appeared in all five seasons of the FIH Pro League. In 2023 he was a member of the squad at the FIH World Cup in Bhubaneswar and Rourkela. He has also won gold medals at the 2022 South American Games in Asunción, and the 2023 Pan American Games in Santiago.

On 7 June 2024, he was named in the national squad for the XXXIII Summer Olympics in Paris.

==== International goals ====
Goal	Date	Location	Opponent	Score	Result	Competition	Ref.
1	29 May 2018	Estadio Félix Capriles, Cochabamba, Bolivia	Uruguay	2–0	5–1	2018 South American Games	
2	29 May 2018	Estadio Félix Capriles, Cochabamba, Bolivia	Uruguay	3–0	5–1	2018 South American Games	
3	29 May 2018	Estadio Félix Capriles, Cochabamba, Bolivia	Uruguay	4–0	5–1	2018 South American Games	
4	4 June 2018	Estadio Félix Capriles, Cochabamba, Bolivia	Brazil	1–0	5–0	2018 South American Games	
5	16 March 2019	Sydney Olympic Park, Sydney, Australia	Australia	2–3	2–3	2019 FIH Pro League	
6	3 October 2022	Parque Olímpico, Asunción, Paraguay	Uruguay	4–0	17–0	2022 South American Games	
7	3 October 2022	Parque Olímpico, Asunción, Paraguay	Uruguay	8–0	17–0	2022 South American Games	
