= Lucas Toscani =

Argentine field hockey player

Personal information
- Born: 22 September 1999 (age 26) Buenos Aires, Argentina

Sport
- Sport: Field hockey
- Position: Forward
- Club: Klein Zwitserland
Youth career
- Team
- –: Banco Provincia
Senior career
Years	Team	Caps	Goals
–2021	Banco Provincia	-	-
2021–2023	Uhlenhorst Mülheim	-	-
2023–2024	Laren	-	-
2024–present	Klein Zwitserland	-	-
National team
Years	Team	Caps	Goals
2019–present	Argentina	65	(14)
Medal record
Men's field hockey
Representing Argentina
World Cup
Bronze medal – third place	2026 Wavre/Amstelveen
Pan American Games
Gold medal – first place	2023 Santiago	Team
Pan American Cup
Gold medal – first place	2022 Santiago
Gold medal – first place	2025 Montevideo

Lucas Toscani (born 22 September 1999) is an Argentine field hockey player who plays as a forward for Dutch Hoofdklasse club Klein Zwitserland and the Argentina national team.

In 2024, he represented Argentina at the XXXIII Summer Olympics in France.

== Club career ==
Toscani played in Argentina for Banco Provincia until 2021 when he moved to Europe where he first played for Uhlenhorst Mülheim in Germany who he represented in the Euro Hockey League. In 2023 he followed fellow Argentinian Lucas Rey to Laren who Rey coached. Laren was relegated at the end of the season and Toscani left them to play for Klein Zwitserland.

== International career ==
Toscani received his first call-up to the Los Leones squad in 2019. He made his senior international debut during season one of the FIH Pro League.

In 2022, Toscani won his first medal with the national team. He won gold at the Pan American Cup in Santiago.

Throughout 2023 Toscani was a regular inclusion in national squads. In January he was represented Los Leones at the FIH World Cup in Bhubaneswar and Rourkela. Later in the year he won his second medal with the national team, taking home gold at the Pan American Games in Santiago.

On 7 June 2024, he was named in the national squad for the XXXIII Summer Olympics in Paris.
