= Nicolás Cicileo =

Argentine field hockey player

Nico Cicileo
Personal information
- Born: 1 October 1993 (age 32) Buenos Aires, Argentina
- Height: 1.75 m (5 ft 9 in)
- Weight: 70 kg (154 lb)

Sport
- Sport: Field hockey
- Position: Defender
- Club: Herakles
Senior career
| Years | Team | Caps | Goals |
| –2015 | Ciudad de Buenos Aires | - | - |
| 2015–2018 | Club de Campo | - | - |
| 2015 | → Terengganu | - | - |
| 2018–2020 | Klein Zwitserland | - | - |
| 2020–2022 | Daring | - | - |
| 2022–present | Herakles | - | - |
National team
| Years | Team | Caps | Goals |
| 2014–present | Argentina | 93 | - |
Medal record
Men's field hockey
Representing Argentina
World Cup
| Bronze medal – third place | 2026 Wavre/Amstelveen |
Pan American Games
| Gold medal – first place | 2019 Lima | Team |
Pan American Cup
| Gold medal – first place | 2022 Santiago |
| Gold medal – first place | 2025 Montevideo |
Pan American Junior Championship
| Gold medal – first place | 2012 Guadalajara |
- Updated on 6 February 2023

Nicolás Cicileo (born 1 October 1993) is an Argentine field hockey player who plays as a defender for the Belgian Hockey League club Herakles and the Argentine national team.

== Club career ==
Cicileo played for Ciudad de Buenos Aires in Argentina until 2015, when he moved to Europe to play for Club de Campo in Spain. During the 2015–16 Spanish winter break, he played for Terengganu in the Malaysia Hockey League. He played three seasons for Club de Campo. After those three seasons he moved to the Netherlands to play for Klein Zwitserland. In April 2020, it was announced that he would join Daring in Belgium for the 2020–21 season. After two seasons in Brussels he left Daring for Herakles.

== International career ==
He represented Argentina at the 2018 Men's Hockey World Cup. In July 2019, he was selected in the Argentina squad for the 2019 Pan American Games. They won the gold medal by defeating Canada 5–2 in the final.
