= Martín Ferreiro =

Argentine field hockey player (born 1997)

Personal information
- Full name: Martín Ignacio Ferreiro
- Born: 21 October 1997 (age 28)

Sport
- Sport: Field hockey
- Position: Forward
- Club: Crefelder HTC
Senior career
Years	Team	Caps	Goals
–2019	Lomas	-	-
2019–2021	Pinoké	-	-
2021–2022	Gantoise	-	-
2022–present	Crefelder HTC	-	-
National team
Years	Team	Caps	Goals
2016	Argentina U21	12	(8)
2018–present	Argentina	81	(24)
Medal record
Men's field hockey
Representing Argentina
World Cup
Bronze medal – third place	2026 Wavre/Amstelveen
Pan American Games
Gold medal – first place	2019 Lima	Team
Pan American Cup
Gold medal – first place	2022 Santiago
South American Games
Gold medal – first place	2018 Cochabamba	Team
Pan American Junior Championship
Gold medal – first place	2016 Toronto
- Updated on 4 February 2023

Martín Ignacio Ferreiro (born 21 October 1997) is an Argentine field hockey player who plays as a forward for German Bundesliga club Crefelder HTC and the Argentine national team.

== Club career ==
Ferreiro played for Lomas in Argentina until 2019. He joined Pinoké in the Dutch Hoofdklasse for the 2019–20 season. After two season in the Netherlands he moved to Belgium to play for Gantoise in Ghent. He only stayed there for one season as he moved to Germany to play for Crefelder HTC in the summer of 2022.

== International career ==
Ferreiro made his debut for the senior national team at the 2018 South American Games. In July 2019, he was selected in the Argentina squad for the 2019 Pan American Games. They won the gold medal by defeating Canada 5–2 in the final. He made his World Cup debut at the 2023 Men's FIH Hockey World Cup.

== Honours ==
Argentina U21

- Pan American Junior Championship: 2016

Argentina

- Pan American Games gold medal: 2019
- Pan American Cup: 2022
- South American Games gold medal: 2018
