= Field hockey at the 2018 South American Games =

- Venue: Estadio Félix Capriles
- Location: Cochabamba, Bolivia
- Dates: 29 May – 7 June
- Nations: 8

Champions
- Men: Argentina
- Women: Argentina

Both the men's and the women's field hockey competitions at the 2018 South American Games were the third inclusion of hockey at the South American Games. Both tournaments were held in conjunction with one another between 29 May – 7 June 2018 at Estadio Félix Capriles in Cochabamba, Bolivia.

The top two teams in each tournament will qualify for the 2019 Pan American Games in Lima, Peru.

== Participating nations ==
=== Men's tournament ===
- Argentina
- Bolivia
- Brazil
- Chile
- Paraguay
- Peru
- Uruguay
- Venezuela

=== Women's tournament ===
- Argentina
- Bolivia
- Brazil
- Chile
- Paraguay
- Uruguay
- Venezuela

=== Medal summary ===
Event	Gold	Silver	Bronze
Men	Argentina	Chile	Brazil
Women	Argentina	Uruguay	Chile

=== Medal table ===
Rank	Nation	Gold	Silver	Bronze	Total
1	Argentina (ARG)	2	0	0	2
2	Chile (CHL)	0	1	1	2
3	Uruguay (URU)	0	1	0	1
4	Brazil (BRA)	0	0	1	1
Totals (4 entries)		2	2	2	6

== Men's tournament ==
Men's field hockey at the 2018 South American Games
Tournament details
- Host country: Bolivia
- City: Cochabamba
- Dates: 29 May – 6 June
- Teams: 8 (from 1 confederation)
- Venue: Estadio Felix Capriles

Final positions
- Champions: Argentina (3rd title)
- Runner-up: Chile
- Third place: Brazil

Tournament statistics
- Matches played: 20
- Goals scored: 96 (4.8 per match)
- Top scorer: (Venezuela) Andy Adrian (7 goals)

=== Preliminary round ===
==== Pool A ====
Pos	Team	Pld	W	D	L	GF	GA	GD	Pts	Qualification
1	Argentina	3	3	0	0	20	2	+18	9	Semi-finals
2	Venezuela	3	2	0	1	16	5	+11	6	Semi-finals
3	Uruguay	3	1	0	2	7	8	−1	3	
4	Bolivia (H)	3	0	0	3	0	28	−28	0	

Source: FIH
Rules for classification: 1) points; 2) goal difference; 3) goals scored; 4) head-to-head result.
(H) Hosts

29 May 2018
09:00

Argentina	5–1	Uruguay
Ferreiro 20'; Catán 28', 34', 35'; Ganly 55'	Report	Rivero 47'

Umpires:
Reinier Díaz (CUB)
Fabian Romero (PAR)

29 May 2018
15:00

Venezuela	12–0	Bolivia
Bracamonte 5', 60'; Rojas 21', 45', 55'; Adrian 25', 39', 53', 56'; Laya 26', 43'; Escobar 51'	Report

Umpires:
Oliver Hock (BRA)
Federico Silva (ARG)

31 May 2018
13:00

Uruguay	4–0	Bolivia
Ferreira 17'; Laborde 21'; Rivero 24'; Iglesias 52'	Report

Umpires:
Reinier Díaz (CUB)
Manuel Sierra (VEN)

31 May 2018
15:00

Venezuela	1–3	Argentina
Adrian 53'	Report	Ferreiro 20'; Andino 23'; Bettaglio 36'

Umpires:
Benjamin Peters (USA)
Daniel López (URU)

2 June 2018
11:00

Argentina	12–0	Bolivia
Ferreiro 2', 2', 29'; Acosta 6'; Ganly 9', 18', 43', 45'; Moreschi 11'; Gómez 22'; Andino 33'; Merino 55'	Report

Umpires:
Fabian Romero (PAR)
Manuel Sierra (VEN)

2 June 2018
15:00

Uruguay	2–3	Venezuela
Ferreira 8'; Rodríguez 59'	Report	Adrian 43', 53'; Abreu 50'

Umpires:
Guillermo Poblete (CHI)
Oliver Hock (BRA)

==== Pool B ====
Pos	Team	Pld	W	D	L	GF	GA	GD	Pts	Qualification
1	Chile	3	3	0	0	18	0	+18	9	Semi-finals
2	Brazil	3	2	0	1	7	5	+2	6	Semi-finals
3	Peru	3	0	1	2	2	10	−8	1	
4	Paraguay	3	0	1	2	2	14	−12	1	

Source: FIH
Rules for classification: 1) points; 2) goal difference; 3) goals scored; 4) head-to-head result.

29 May 2018
11:00

Brazil	2–1	Peru
Borges 53'; Paixão 54'	Report	Dennison 43'

Umpires:
Daniel López (URU)
Manuel Sierra (VEN)

29 May 2018
13:00

Chile	8–0	Paraguay
Rodríguez 1', 43', 45', 60'; Fer. Renz 10'; Esparza 12'; Purcell 18'; Troncoso 54'	Report

Umpires:
Benjamin Peters (USA)
Luca Ollino (ITA)

31 May 2018
09:00

Peru	1–1	Paraguay
Dennison 58'	Report	Ruetalo 53'

Umpires:
Guillermo Poblete (CHI)
Frederico Silva (BRA)

31 May 2018
11:00

Chile	3–0	Brazil
Fer. Renz 14'; Troncoso 39', 41'	Report

Umpires:
Fabian Romero (PAR)
Luca Ollino (ITA)

2 June 2018
09:00

Brazil	5–1	Paraguay
Paixão 17', 56'; Borges 23', 39'; Vaz 48'	Report	Laneri 26'

Umpires:
Luca Ollino (ITA)
Daniel López (URU)

2 June 2018
13:00

Peru	0–7	Chile
	Report	Hurtado 6'; Fel. Renz 8'; Troncoso 26', 58'; Amoroso 27'; Richter 27'; Martín 52'

Umpires:
Reinier Díaz (CUB)
Federico Silva (ARG)

=== Fifth to eighth place classification ===
5–8th place semi-finals
4 June
Uruguay	2
Paraguay	0
4 June
Peru	2
Bolivia	1

Fifth place
6 June
Uruguay	0 (2)
Peru (s.o)	0 (3)
Seventh place
6 June
Paraguay	4
Bolivia	1

==== 5–8th place semi-finals ====
4 June 2018
13:00

Uruguay	2–0	Paraguay
Rivero 14'; Iglesias 45'	Report

Umpires:
Manuel Sierra (VEN)
Federico Silva (ARG)

4 June 2018
15:30

Peru	2–1	Bolivia
Dennison 13', 21'	Report	Yevara 58'

Umpires:
Daniel López (URU)
Oliver Hock (BRA)

==== 7th & 8th place ====
6 June 2018
08:00

Paraguay	4–1	Bolivia
Samudio 4'; Vera 6', 43'; Pereira 46'	Report	Torres 38'

Umpires:
Benjamin Peters (USA)
Guillermo Poblete (CHI)

==== 5th & 6th place ====
6 June 2018
10:30

Uruguay	0–0	Peru
	Report
Penalties
A. López (penalty shoot-out missed); Laborde (penalty shoot-out scored); Tixe (penalty shoot-out scored); Rivero (penalty shoot-out missed); Ferreira (penalty shoot-out missed)	2–3	(penalty shoot-out scored) De Martis; (penalty shoot-out scored) López; (penalty shoot-out missed) Dennison; (penalty shoot-out scored) Díaz

Umpires:
Luca Ollino (ITA)
Oliver Hock (BRA)

=== Medal round ===
Semi-finals
4 June
Argentina	5
Brazil	0
4 June
Chile	4
Venezuela	0

Gold medal match
6 June
Argentina	1
Chile	0
Bronze medal match
6 June
Brazil (s.o)	2 (4)
Venezuela	2 (3)

==== Semi-finals ====
4 June 2018
08:00

Argentina	5–0	Brazil
Catán 7'; Rothbart 30'; Ferreiro 43'; Bugallo 45'; Ganly 54'	Report

Umpires:
Guillermo Poblete (CHI)
Benjamin Peters (USA)

4 June 2018
10:30

Chile	4–0	Venezuela
Amoroso 8'; Zarhi 42'; Fel. Renz 49'; Richter 52'	Report

Umpires:
Reinier Díaz (CUB)
Fabian Romero (PAR)

==== Bronze medal match ====
6 June 2018
13:00

Brazil	2–2	Venezuela
Borges 3'; Paixão 39'	Report	Rojas 39'; Velesquez 54'
Penalties
Y. van der Heijden (penalty shoot-out scored); Bitencourt (penalty shoot-out scored); Lopez (penalty shoot-out scored); P. van der Heijden (penalty shoot-out missed); Paixão (penalty shoot-out missed); Y. van der Heijden (penalty shoot-out scored)	4–3	(penalty shoot-out scored) Oropeza; (penalty shoot-out scored) Bracamonte; (penalty shoot-out scored) Alvarez; (penalty shoot-out missed) Castro; (penalty shoot-out missed) Abreu; (penalty shoot-out missed) Oropeza

Umpires:
Reiner Diaz Garcia (CUB)
Federico Silva (ARG)

==== Gold medal match ====
6 June 2018
15:30

Argentina	1–0	Chile
Merino 40'	Report

Umpires:
Daniel Lopez Ramos (URU)
Fabian Romero (PAR)

=== Final standings ===
Pos	Team	Qualification
1	Argentina	2019 Pan American Games
2	Chile	2019 Pan American Games
3	Brazil	
4	Venezuela	
5	Peru	
6	Uruguay	
7	Paraguay	
8	Bolivia (H)	

Source: FIH
(H) Host

== Women's tournament ==
Women's field hockey at the 2018 South American Games
Tournament details
- Host country: Bolivia
- City: Cochabamba
- Dates: 30 May – 7 June
- Teams: 7 (from 1 confederation)
- Venue: Estadio Felix Capriles

Final positions
- Champions: Argentina (3rd title)
- Runner-up: Uruguay
- Third place: Chile

Tournament statistics
- Matches played: 15
- Goals scored: 96 (6.4 per match)
- Top scorer: (Argentina) Maria Campoy (8 goals)

=== Preliminary round ===
==== Pool A ====
Pos	Team	Pld	W	D	L	GF	GA	GD	Pts	Qualification
1	Argentina	2	2	0	0	34	0	+34	6	Semi-finals
2	Brazil	2	1	0	1	1	13	−12	3	Semi-finals
3	Peru	2	0	0	2	0	22	−22	0	

Source: FIH
Rules for classification: 1) points; 2) goal difference; 3) goals scored; 4) head-to-head result.

30 May 2018
13:00

Argentina	21–0	Peru
Campoy 1', 8', 11', 16', 53', 57'; Jardel 15', 30'; Alonso 19'; Mi. Fernández Ladra 24', 30', 45', 54'; Albertario 34', 34', 48'; Gorzelany 49'; Jankunas 50', 54', 59'; Toccalino 59'	Report

Umpires:
Claudia Montino (CHI)
Victoria Pazos (PAR)

1 June 2018
13:00

Brazil	0–13	Argentina
	Report	Gorzelany 2', 54'; Mi. Fernández Ladra 11', 24'; Jankunas 14', 22'; Campoy 30'; Jardel 30', 39'; Toccalino 38', 48'; Sauze 49'; Dichiara 60'

Umpires:
Carolina Kappes (CHI)
Claudia Montino (CHI)

3 June 2018
11:00

Peru	0–1	Brazil
	Report	Sluis 41'

Umpires:
Natalia Lodeiro (URU)
Claudia Montino (CHI)

==== Pool B ====
Pos	Team	Pld	W	D	L	GF	GA	GD	Pts	Qualification
1	Uruguay	3	2	1	0	13	1	+12	7	Semi-finals
2	Chile	3	2	1	0	12	1	+11	7	Semi-finals
3	Bolivia (H)	3	1	0	2	4	13	−9	3	
4	Paraguay	3	0	0	3	1	15	−14	0	

Source: FIH
Rules for classification: 1) points; 2) goal difference; 3) goals scored; 4) head-to-head result.
(H) Hosts

30 May 2018
11:00

Chile	5–0	Paraguay
Solano 11'; Caram 25'; Urroz 27', 56'; Jacob 58'	Report

Umpires:
Ayanna McClean (TTO)
María Locatelli (ARG)

30 May 2018
15:00

Uruguay	6–0	Bolivia
Olave 4', 60'; Casarotti 12'; Viana 40', 44'; Villar 6'	Report

Umpires:
Carolina Kappes (CHI)
Veronica Villafañe (ARG))

1 June 2018
11:00

Paraguay	1–4	Bolivia
Ruiz 34'	Report	Pardo 10', 36'; Carballo 49'; Villarroel 57'

Umpires:
Natalia Lodeiro (URU)
Veronica Villafañe (ARG)

1 June 2018
15:00

Uruguay	1–1	Chile
Lamberti 15+'	Report	Jacob 15'

Umpires:
Maggie Giddens (USA)
Victoria Pazos (PAR)

3 June 2018
13:00

Chile	6–0	Bolivia
Tala 6'; Valdivia 26'; Krimerman 30'; Salas 30+'; Jacob 32', 43'	Report

Umpires:
María Locatelli (ARG)
Ayanna McClean (TTO)

3 June 2018
15:00

Paraguay	0–6	Uruguay
	Report	García 7'; Castro 10'; Algorta 34'; Dall'Orso 44'; Olave 53'; Villar 58'

Umpires:
Veronica Villafañe (ARG)
Maggie Giddens (USA)

=== Fifth to seventh place classification ===
5–7th place semifinal
5 June
Peru	1
Paraguay	4

5th place
7 June
Bolivia	1
Paraguay	2

5 June 2018
10:30

Peru	1–4	Paraguay
Álvarez 29'	Report	Vera 17'; Catebra 21'; Sánchez 44'; Ruiz 54'

Umpires:
Carolina Kappes (CHI)
Natalia Lodeiro (URU)

7 June 2018
10:30

Bolivia	1–2	Paraguay
Pardo 28'	Report	Cacace 25'; Sánchez 30'

Umpires:
María Locatelli (ARG)
Claudia Montino (CHI)

=== First to fourth place classification ===
Semi-finals
5 June
Argentina	2
Chile	0
5 June
Uruguay	6
Brazil	0

Gold medal match
7 June
Argentina	8
Uruguay	0
Bronze medal match
7 June
Chile	7
Brazil	0

==== Semi-finals ====
5 June 2018
13:00

Argentina	2–0	Chile
Jardel 53'; Toccalino 56'	Report

Umpires:
Maggie Giddens (USA)
Ayanna McClean (TTO)

5 June 2018
15:30

Uruguay	6–0	Brazil
Lamberti 5'; Viana 18'; Olave 30'; Algorta 45'; García 47'; Dall'Orso 50'	Report

Umpires:
Veronica Villafañe (ARG)
María Locatelli (ARG)

==== Bronze medal match ====
7 June 2018
13:00

Chile	7–0	Brazil
Flores 21', 57'; Valdivia 26'; Jacob 32'; Tala 43'; Villalabeitia 44'; Krimerman 53'	Report

Umpires:
Natalia Lodeiro (URU)
Maggie Giddens (USA)

==== Gold medal match ====
7 June 2018
15:30

Argentina	8–0	Uruguay
Campoy 7'; Gorzelany 11', 18'; Albertario 15', 55'; Mi. Fernández Ladra 30'; Jankunas 57', 58'	Report

Umpires:
Ayanna McLean (TTO)
Victoria Pazos (PAR)

=== Final standings ===
Pos	Team	Qualification
1	Argentina	2019 Pan American Games
2	Uruguay	2019 Pan American Games
3	Chile	
4	Brazil	
5	Paraguay	
6	Bolivia (H)	
7	Peru	

Source: FIH
(H) Host
