= Thomas Habif =

Argentine field hockey player

Personal information
- Full name: Thomas Ezequiel Habif
- Born: 27 May 1996 (age 30) Buenos Aires, Argentina
- Height: 1.74 m (5 ft 9 in)
- Weight: 68 kg (150 lb)

Sport
- Sport: Field hockey
- Position: Midfielder
- Club: Mannheimer HC
Senior career
| Years | Team | Caps | Goals |
| –2021 | GEBA | - | - |
| 2021–2024 | Harvestehuder THC | - | - |
| 2024–present | Mannheimer HC | - | - |
National team
| Years | Team | Caps | Goals |
| 2016 | Argentina U21 | 81 | (2) |
| 2019–present | Argentina | 48 | (1) |
Medal record
Men's field hockey
Representing Argentina
World Cup
| Bronze medal – third place | 2026 Wavre/Amstelveen |
Pan American Games
| Gold medal – first place | 2023 Santiago | Team |
Pan American Cup
| Gold medal – first place | 2022 Santiago |
| Gold medal – first place | 2025 Montevideo |
South American Games
| Gold medal – first place | 2022 Asunción | Team |
Pan American Junior Championship
| Gold medal – first place | 2016 Toronto |
- Updated on 8 December 2024

Thomas Ezequiel Habif (born 27 May 1996) is an Argentine field hockey player who plays as a midfielder for German Bundesliga club Mannheimer HC and the Argentine national team.

His sisters Florencia and Agustina have also respresented Argentina in hockey.

== Club career ==
Habif played for GEBA in Argentina until the 2020 Summer Olympics. After the Olympics he joined Bundesliga club Harvestehuder THC in Hamburg. After the next Olympics in 2024 he moved to Mannheimer HC, the clubs where his two sisters also play.

== International career ==
He competed in the 2020 Summer Olympics. He made his World Cup debut at the 2023 Men's FIH Hockey World Cup.
