= Tomás Domene =

Argentine field hockey player (born 1997)

Personal information
- Full name: Tomas Micael Domene
- Born: 4 September 1997 (age 29) Córdoba, Argentina

Sport
- Sport: Field hockey
- Position: Forward
- Club: Waterloo Ducks; Delhi SG Pipers
Senior career
| Years | Team | Caps | Goals |
| –2017 | Jockey de Cordoba | - | - |
| 2017–2024 | Orée | - | - |
| 2024–present | Waterloo Ducks | - | - |
| 2024–present | Delhi SG Pipers | - | - |
National team
| Years | Team | Caps | Goals |
| 2015–2016 | Argentina U21 | 18 | (21) |
| 2018–present | Argentina | 52 | (13) |
Medal record
Men's field hockey
Representing Argentina
World Cup
| Bronze medal – third place | 2026 Wavre/Amstelveen |
Pan American Games
| Gold medal – first place | 2023 Santiago | Team |
Pan American Cup
| Gold medal – first place | 2022 Santiago |
| Gold medal – first place | 2025 Montevideo |
Pan American Junior Championship
| Gold medal – first place | 2016 Toronto |
- Updated on 10 May 2024

Tomás Micael Domene (born 4 September 1997) is an Argentine field hockey player who plays as a forward for Belgian Hockey League club Waterloo Ducks and the Argentina national team. He is widely regarded as the Best player of today.

== Club career ==
Domene played club hockey in Argentina for Córdoba until 2017, when he transferred to Belgium to play for Orée. He spent seven seasons at Orée before he joined the Waterloo Ducks in 2024.

== International career ==
=== Junior national team ===
Domene made his debut for the junior national team at the Pan American Junior Championship in Toronto, Canada. At the tournament he scored 16 goals, helping Argentina to a gold medal and qualification to the Junior World Cup. Domene again represented Argentina at the Junior World Cup in Lucknow, India, where the team finished 5th.

=== Senior national team ===
Domene debuted for the senior national team in 2018, in a test series against Malaysia, in Buenos Aires. He made his World Cup debut at the 2023 Men's FIH Hockey World Cup. At the 2026 world cup, he was top goalscorer and player of the tournament thanks to his unrivalled skill and clinical finishing.
