= Agustín Bugallo =

Argentine field hockey player (born 1995)

Personal information
- Full name: Agustín Fernando Bugallo
- Born: 23 April 1995 (age 31) San Juan, Argentina
- Height: 1.80 m (5 ft 11 in)
- Weight: 75 kg (165 lb)

Sport
- Sport: Field hockey
- Position: Midfielder
- Club: Mitre
Senior career
Years	Team	Caps	Goals
–2012	BHC	-	-
2013–2019	Mitre	-	-
2019–2020	Pinoké	-	-
2020–2021	HGC	-	-
2021–2022	Gantoise	-	-
2022–2023	Club de Campo	-	-
2023–present	Mitre	-	-
National team
Years	Team	Caps	Goals
2015–2016	Argentina U21	18	(1)
2017–present	Argentina	116	(10)
Medal record
Men's field hockey
Representing Argentina
Pan American Games
Gold medal – first place	2019 Lima	Team
Gold medal – first place	2023 Santiago	Team
Pan American Cup
Gold medal – first place	2017 Lancaster
Gold medal – first place	2022 Santiago
Hockey World League
Silver medal – second place	2016–17 Bhubaneswar	Team
South American Games
Gold medal – first place	2018 Cochabamba	Team
Pan American Junior Championship
Gold medal – first place	2016 Toronto
- Updated on 18 September 2023

Agustín Fernando Bugallo (born 23 April 1995) is an Argentine field hockey player for who plays as a midfielder for Mitre and the Argentine national team.

== Club career ==
Bugallo played for BHC and Mitre in Argentina until 2019. In July 2019, it was announced he would play for Pinoké in the Netherlands for the 2019–20 season. He joined HGC in the summer of 2020 after one season with Pinoké. He left the Netherlands after two seasons for Belgium to play for Gantoise in Ghent. After one season he left Gantoise for Club de Campo in Spain. He won the Copa del Rey and the División de Honor.

== International career ==
Bugallo represented Argentina at the 2018 Men's Hockey World Cup. In July 2019, he was selected in the Argentina squad for the 2019 Pan American Games. They won the gold medal by defeating Canada 5–2 in the final. Bugallo also competed at the 2024 Summer Olympics.
