= United States at the 2011 Pan American Games =

- IOC code: USA
- NOC: United States Olympic Committee
- Website: www.teamusa.org

in Guadalajara 14–30 October 2011
- Competitors: 627 in 36 sports
- Flag bearers: Jason Read (opening); Tony Azevedo (closing)
- Medals Ranked 1st: Gold 92 Silver 79 Bronze 65 Total 236

Pan American Games appearances (overview)
- 1951; 1955; 1959; 1963; 1967; 1971; 1975; 1979; 1983; 1987; 1991; 1995; 1999; 2003; 2007; 2011; 2015; 2019; 2023; 2027

The United States competed at the 2011 Pan American Games in Guadalajara, Mexico, from October 14 to October 30, 2011.

The chef de mission for the United States for these Pan American Games was Alan Ashley, the USOC's Chief of Sport Performance. The city of Houston, Texas, served as the processing center for athletes participating in the 2011 Pan American Games.

== Medalists ==
Medals by sport
Sport	1st place, gold medalist(s)	2nd place, silver medalist(s)	3rd place, bronze medalist(s)	Total
Swimming	18	19	9	46
Fencing	11	3	0	14
Shooting	10	4	4	18
Gymnastics	9	5	4	18
Water skiing	6	0	1	7
Wrestling	5	5	2	12
Equestrian	5	3	2	10
Athletics	4	8	5	17
Rowing	4	2	2	8
Bowling	3	1	0	4
Cycling	2	3	2	7
Archery	2	2	0	4
Canoeing	2	0	2	4
Water polo	2	0	0	2
Racquetball	1	4	2	7
Badminton	1	3	2	6
Judo	1	1	5	7
Tennis	1	1	2	4
Karate	1	1	0	2
Triathlon	1	1	0	2
Field hockey	1	0	0	1
Modern pentathlon	1	0	0	1
Softball	1	0	0	1
Sailing	0	4	2	6
Basque pelota	0	2	1	3
Diving	0	2	1	3
Synchronized swimming	0	2	0	2
Taekwondo	0	1	5	6
Squash	0	1	3	4
Baseball	0	1	0	1
Table tennis	0	0	3	3
Weightlifting	0	0	3	3
Basketball	0	0	1	1
Rugby sevens	0	0	1	1
Volleyball	0	0	1	1
Total	92	79	65	236

Medal	Name	Sport	Event	Date
Gold	Heather Irmiger	Cycling	Women's cross-country	October 15
Gold	Julie Zetlin	Gymnastics	Women's rhythmic individual all-around	October 15
Gold	Margaux Isaksen	Modern pentathlon	Women's tournament	October 15
Gold	Charlie Houchin	Swimming	Men's 400 metre freestyle	October 15
Gold	Claire Donahue	Swimming	Women's 100 metre butterfly	October 15
Gold	Julia Smit	Swimming	Women's 400 metre individual medley	October 15
Gold	Erika Erndl; Amanda Kendall; Madison Kennedy; Elizabeth Pelton	Swimming	Women's 4 × 100 metre freestyle relay	October 15
Gold	Heather Blitz; Marisa Festerling; Cesar Parra; Steffen Peters	Equestrian	Team dressage	October 16
Gold	Daryl Szarenski	Shooting	Men's 10 metre air pistol	October 16
Gold	Rachel Bootsma	Swimming	Women's 100 metre backstroke	October 16
Gold	Catherine Breed	Swimming	Women's 200 metre freestyle	October 16
Gold	Julie Zetlin	Gymnastics	Women's rhythmic individual ball	October 17
Gold	Matt Rawlings	Shooting	Men's 10 metre air rifle	October 17
Gold	Emily Caruso	Shooting	Women's 10 metre air rifle	October 17
Gold	Gillian Ryan	Swimming	Women's 400 metre freestyle	October 17
Gold	Ann Chandler	Swimming	Women's 100 metre breaststroke	October 17
Gold	Julie Zetlin	Gymnastics	Women's individual ribbon	October 18
Gold	Mike Gennaro; Ty Otto	Rowing	Men's coxless pair	October 18
Gold	Margot Shumway	Rowing	Women's single sculls	October 18
Gold	Miranda Wilder	Shooting	Women's trap	October 18
Gold	Arthur Frayler	Swimming	Men's 1500 metre freestyle	October 18
Gold	Sean Mahoney	Swimming	Men's 200 metre breaststroke	October 18
Gold	Julia Smit	Swimming	Women's 200 metre individual medley	October 18
Gold	Catherine Breed; Amanda Kendall; Chelsea Nauta; Elizabeth Pelton; Erika Erndl^{*} Kim Vandenberg^{*}	Swimming	Women's 4 × 200 metre freestyle relay	October 18
Gold	Howard Bach; Tony Gunawan	Badminton	Men's doubles	October 19
Gold	Steffen Peters	Equestrian	Individual dressage	October 19
Gold	Marcus McElhenney; Matt Wheeler; Joe Spencer; Steve Kasprzyk; Jason Read; Mike Gennaro; Ty Otto; Blaise Didier; Derek Johnson	Rowing	Men's eight	October 19
Gold	Jennifer Goldsack	Rowing	Women's lightweight single sculls	October 19
Gold	Jason Parker	Shooting	Men's 50 metre rifle prone	October 19
Gold	Conor Dwyer; Eugene Godsoe; Douglas Robison; Marcus Titus; David Russell^{*} Robert Savulich^{*} Kevin Swander^{*}	Swimming	Men's 4 × 200 metre freestyle relay	October 19
Gold	Amanda Kendall	Swimming	Women's 100 metre freestyle	October 19
Gold	Kim Vandenberg	Swimming	Women's 200 metre butterfly	October 19
Gold	Glen Eller	Shooting	Men's double trap	October 20
Gold	Elizabeth Pelton	Swimming	Women's 200 metre backstroke	October 20
Gold	Brady Ellison; Joe Fanchin; Jake Kaminski	Archery	Men's team	October 21
Gold	Connor Fields	Cycling	Men's BMX	October 21
Gold	Jason Parker	Shooting	Men's 50 metre rifle three positions	October 21
Gold	Kim Rhode	Shooting	Women's skeet	October 21
Gold	Lara Jackson	Swimming	Women's 50 metre freestyle	October 21
Gold	Rachel Bootsma; Ann Chandler; Claire Donahue; Amanda Kendall; Elaine Breeden^{*} Erika Erndl^{*} Elizabeth Pelton^{*} Ashley Wanland^{*}	Swimming	Women's 4 × 100 metre medley relay	October 21
Gold	Irina Falconi	Tennis	Women's singles	October 21
Gold	Brady Ellison	Archery	Men's individual	October 22
Gold	Rocky Carson	Racquetball	Men's singles	October 22
Gold	Emil Milev	Shooting	Men's 25 m rapid fire pistol	October 22
Gold	Vincent Hancock	Shooting	Men's skeet	October 22
Gold	Andrew Adkinson	Water skiing	Men's wakeboard	October 22
Gold	Regina Jacuqess	Water skiing	Women's overall	October 22
Gold	Helen Maroulis	Wrestling	Women's Freestyle 55kg	October 22
Gold	Hannah Burnett; Bruce Davidson Jr. Shannon Lilley; Michael Pollard; Lynn Symansky	Equestrian	Team eventing	October 23
Gold	United States women's national softball team: Valerie Arioto; Whitney Canion; Kaitlin Cochrane; Lauren Gibson; Kelley Grieve; Taylor Hoagland; Ashley Holcombe; Molly Johnson; Stacy May-Johnson; Megan Langerfeld; Jenae Leles; Michelle Moultrie; Christine Orgeron; Keilani Ricketts; Brittany Schute; Jordan Taylor; Rhea Taylor; Chelsea Thomas	Softball	Women's tournament	October 23
Gold	Sarah Haskins	Triathlon	Women's race	October 23
Gold	Frederick Krueger IV	Water Skiing	Men's jump	October 23
Gold	Jonathan Travers	Water Skiing	Men's slalom	October 23
Gold	Regina Jacuqess	Water Skiing	Women's jump	October 23
Gold	Regina Jacuqess	Water skiing	Women's slalom	October 23
Gold	Jake Herbert	Wrestling	Men's freestyle 84 kg	October 23
Gold	Tervel Dlagnev	Wrestling	Men's freestyle 120 kg	October 23
Gold	Seth Kelsey	Fencing	Men's individual épée	October 24
Gold	Lee Kiefer	Fencing	Women's individual foil	October 24
Gold	Bridgette Caquatto; Jessie DeZiel; Brandie Jay; Shawn Johnson; Grace McLaughlin; Bridget Sloan	Gymnastics	Women's artistic team all-around	October 24
Gold	Jordan Burroughs	Wrestling	Men's freestyle 74 kg	October 24
Gold	Jake Varner	Wrestling	Men's freestyle 96 kg	October 24
Gold	Bill O'Neill; Chris Barnes	Bowling	Men's pairs	October 25
Gold	Kelly Kulick; Liz Johnson	Bowling	Women's pairs	October 25
Gold	Alexander Massialas	Fencing	Men's individual foil	October 25
Gold	Mariel Zagunis	Fencing	Women's individual sabre	October 25
Gold	Kibwe Johnson	Athletics	Men's hammer throw	October 26
Gold	Yvette Lewis	Athletics	Women's 100 m hurdles	October 26
Gold	Bridgette Caquatto	Gymnastics	Women's artistic individual all-around	October 26
Gold	Kelley Hurley	Fencing	Women's individual épée	October 26
Gold	Alicia Deshasier	Athletics	Women's javelin throw	October 27
Gold	Liz Johnson	Bowling	Women's individual	October 27
Gold	Elizabeth Madden; Christine McCrea; Mclain Ward; Kent Farrington	Equestrian	Team jumping	October 27
Gold	Seth Kelsey; Soren Thompson; Cody Mattern	Fencing	Men's team épée	October 27
Gold	Lee Kiefer; Doris Willette; Nzingha Prescod	Fencing	Women's team foil	October 27
Gold	Brandon Wynn	Gymnastics	Men's individual rings	October 27
Gold	Bridgette Caquatto	Gymnsatics	Women's individual uneven bars	October 27
Gold	Brandie Jay	Gymnsatics	Women's individual vault	October 27
Gold	Kayla Harrison	Judo	Women's +78 kg	October 27
Gold	Sara Hall	Athletics	Women's 3000 metres steeplechase	October 28
Gold	Carrie Johnson	Canoeing	Women's K-1 500 metres	October 28
Gold	Miles Chamley-Watson; Alexander Massialas; Gerek Meinhardt	Fencing	Men's team foil	October 28
Gold	Ibtihaj Muhammad; Mariel Zagunis; Dagmara Wozniak	Fencing	Women's team sabre	October 28
Gold	United States women's national field hockey team: Kayla Bashore-Smedley; Michelle Cesan; Lauren Crandall; Rachel Dawson; Katelyn Falgowski; Melissa Gonzalez; Michelle Kasold; Claire Laubach; Caroline Nichols; Katie O'Donnell; Julia Reinprecht; Katie Reinprecht; Paige Selenski; Amy Swensen; Shannon Taylor; Michelle Vittese	Field hockey	Women's tournament	October 28
Gold	Paul Ruggeri	Gymnastics	Men's horizontal bar	October 28
Gold	United States women's national water polo team: Elizabeth Armstrong; Heather Petri; Melissa Seidemann; Brenda Villa; Lauren Wenger; Margaret Steffens; Courtney Mathewson; Jessica Steffens; Elsie Windes; Kelly Rulon; Annika Dries; Kami Craig; Tumuaialii Anae	Water polo	Women's tournament	October 28
Gold	Carrie Johnson	Canoeing	Women's K-1 200 metres	October 29
Gold	Christine McCrea	Equestrian	Individual jumping	October 29
Gold	Ben Igoe; Tim Morehouse; James Williams	Fencing	Men's team sabre	October 29
Gold	Lindsay Campbell; Courtney Hurley; Kelly Hurley	Fencing	Women's team épée	October 29
Gold	Shannon Nishi	Karate	Women's 55 kg	October 29
Gold	United States men's national water polo team: Merrill Moses; Peter Varellas; Peter Hudnut; Ryan Bailey; Tony Azevedo; Jeff Powers; Layne Beaubien; Adam Wright; Tim Hutten; Jesse Smith; Brian Alexander; J. W. Krumpholz; Chay Lapin	Water polo	Men's tournament	October 29
Silver	Matthew Patton	Swimming	Men's 400 metre freestyle	October 15
Silver	Conor Dwyer	Swimming	Men's 400 metre individual medley	October 15
Silver	Elizabeth Pelton	Swimming	Women's 100 metre backstroke	October 16
Silver	Christopher Brady; William Copeland; Douglas Robison; Robert Savulich; Connor Dwyer^{*} Eugene Godsoe^{*}	Swimming	Men's 4 × 100 metre freestyle relay	October 16
Silver	Chelsea Nauta	Swimming	Women's 200 metre freestyle	October 16
Silver	Michael Blacthford; Dean Tracy; Jimmy Watkins	Cycling	Men's team sprint	October 17
Silver	Julie Zetlin	Gymnastics	Women's rhythmic individual hoop	October 17
Silver	Jessica Bogdanov; Megan Frolich; Aimee Gupta; Michelle Pryzbylo; Sofya Roytburg; Sydney Sachs	Gymnastics	Women's rhythmic group 5 balls	October 17
Silver	Catherine Reddick; Megan Walsh	Rowing	Women's double sculls	October 17
Silver	Megan Smith; Monica George	Rowing	Women's coxless pair	October 17
Silver	Jonathan Hall	Shooting	Men's 10 metre air rifle	October 17
Silver	Christopher Gordon; Julian Illingworth	Squash	Men's doubles	October 17
Silver	Eugene Godsoe	Swimming	Men's 100 metre backstroke	October 17
Silver	Daniel Madwed	Swimming	Men's 200 metre butterfly	October 17
Silver	Ashely Wanland	Swimming	Women's 100 metre breaststroke	October 17
Silver	Paige McPherson	Taekwondo	Women's 67 kg	October 17
Silver	Dakota Earnest	Gymnastics	Women's trampoline	October 18
Silver	Daryl Szarenski	Shooting	Men's 50 metre pistol	October 18
Silver	Ryan Feeley	Swimming	Men's 1500 metre freestyle	October 18
Silver	Clark Burckle	Swimming	Men's 200 metre breaststroke	October 18
Silver	Halim Ho; Sattawat Pongnairat	Badminton	Men's doubles	October 19
Silver	Iris Wang; Rena Wang	Badminton	Women's doubles	October 19
Silver	Heather Blitz	Equestrian	Individual dressage	October 19
Silver	Sandra Uptagrafft	Shooting	Women's 25 metre pistol	October 19
Silver	Conor Dywer	Swimming	Men's 200 metre individual medley	October 19
Silver	Erika Erndl	Swimming	Women's 100 metre freestyle	October 19
Silver	Ashley Twichell	Swimming	Women's 800 metre freestyle	October 19
Silver	Lyndsay DePaul	Swimming	Women's 200 metre butterfly	October 19
Silver	Halim Ho; Eva Lee	Badminton	Mixed doubles	October 20
Silver	Eugene Godsoe	Swimming	Men's 100 metre butterfly	October 20
Silver	Bonnie Brandon	Swimming	Women's 200 metre backstroke	October 20
Silver	Haley Spencer	Swimming	Women's 200 metre breaststroke	October 20
Silver	Mary Killman; Maria Koroleva	Synchronized swimming	Women's duet	October 20
Silver	Miranda Leek; Khatuna Lorig; Heather Koehl	Archery	Women's team	October 21
Silver	Nic Long	Cycling	Men's BMX	October 21
Silver	Arielle Martin	Cycling	Women's BMX	October 21
Silver	Matt Wallace	Shooting	Men's 50 metre rifle three positions	October 21
Silver	Christopher Brady; Eugene Godsoe; Douglas Robison; Marcus Titus; David Russell^{*} Robert Savulich^{*} Kevin Swander^{*}	Swimming	Men's 4 × 100 metre medley relay	October 21
Silver	Morgan Fuller; Megan Hansley; Mary Killman; Maria Koroleva; Michelle Moore; Leah Pinette; Lyssa Wallace; Katy Wiita; Alison Williams	Synchronized swimming	Women's team	October 21
Silver	Irina Falconi; Christina McHale	Tennis	Women's doubles	October 21
Silver	Joe Betterman	Wrestling	Men's Greco-Roman 60 kg	October 21
Silver	Ben Provisor	Wrestling	Men's Greco-Roman 74 kg	October 21
Silver	Miranda Leek	Archery	Women's individual	October 22
Silver	Rhonda Rajsich	Racquetball	Women's singles	October 22
Silver	Rhonda Rajsich; Aimee Ruiz	Racquetball	Women's doubles	October 22
Silver	Arthur Frayler	Swimming	Men's 10 kilometre marathon	October 22
Silver	Clarissa Chun	Wrestling	Women's Freestyle 48kg	October 22
Silver	Elena Pirozhkova	Wrestling	Women's Freestyle 63 kg	October 22
Silver	Hannah Burnett	Equestrian	Individual eventing	October 23
Silver	John Mollicone; Geoffry Becker; Daniel Rabin; George Paul Abdullah	Sailing	J/24 class	October 23
Silver	Jody Lutz; Jay Lutz; Derek Gauger	Sailing	Lightning class	October 23
Silver	Augie Diaz; Kathleen Tocke	Sailing	Snipe class	October 23
Silver	Paul Foerster	Sailing	Sunfish class	October 23
Silver	Manuel Huerta	Triathlon	Men's race	October 23
Silver	Obenson Blanc	Wrestling	Men's freestyle 55 kg	October 23
Silver	Jarred Rome	Athletics	Men's discus throw	October 24
Silver	Nzingha Prescod	Fencing	Women's individual foil	October 24
Silver	Barbara Pierre	Athletics	Women's 100 m	October 25
Silver	United States national baseball team: Pete Andrelczyk; Jeff Beliveau; Brett Carroll; Justin Cassell; Matt Clark; Jordan Danks; Chuckie Fick; Jim Gallagher; Andrew Garcia; Tuffy Gosewisch; Brett Jackson; Jeff Marquez; James McCann; Tommy Mendonca; Jordy Mercer; Scott Patterson; A. J. Pollock; Todd Redmond; Matt Shoemaker; Drew Smyly; Joe Thurston; Chad Tracy; Andy Van Hekken; Randy Williams	Baseball	Men's tournament	October 25
Silver	Alex Ackerman; Rocky Carson; Christopher Crowther; Shane Vanderson	Racquetball	Men's team	October 25
Silver	Rhonda Rajsich; Amiee Ruiz; Cheryl Gudinas	Racquetball	Women's team	October 25
Silver	Michael Mai	Athletics	Men's hammer throw	October 26
Silver	Shameka Marshall	Athletics	Women's long jump	October 26
Silver	Troy Dumais; Kristian Ipsen	Diving	Men's 3 m synchronized springboard	October 26
Silver	Courtney Hurley	Fencing	Women's individual épée	October 26
Silver	Tim Morehouse	Fencing	Men's individual sabre	October 26
Silver	Roberto Huarte	Basque pelota	Men's mano singles 36m fronton	October 27
Silver	Tony Huarte; Jose Huarte	Basque pelota	Men's mano doubles 36m fronton	October 27
Silver	Chris Barnes	Bowling	Men's individual	October 27
Silver	Shawn Johnson	Gymnastics	Women's individual uneven bars	October 27
Silver	Jeremy Scott	Athletics	Men's pole vault	October 28
Silver	Cyrus Hostetler	Athletics	Men's javelin throw	October 28
Silver	Kenyanna Wilson; Barbara Pierre; Yvette Lewis; Chastity Riggien	Athletics	Women's 4 × 100 metres relay	October 28
Silver	Aretha Thurmond	Athletics	Women's discus throw	October 28
Silver	Cassidy Krug	Diving	Women's 3 metre springboard	October 28
Silver	Paul Ruggeri	Gymnastics	Men's parallel bars	October 28
Silver	Kenny Hashimoto	Judo	Men's 66 kg	October 28
Silver	Elizabeth Madden	Equestrian	Individual jumping	October 29
Silver	Thomas Scott	Karate	Men's 75 kg	October 29
Bronze	Jeremiah Bishop	Cycling	Men's cross-country	October 15
Bronze	Elaine Breeden	Swimming	Women's 100 metre butterfly	October 15
Bronze	Robert Margalis Jr.	Swimming	Men's 400 metre individual medley	October 15
Bronze	Allysa Vavra	Swimming	Women's 400 metre individual medley	October 15
Bronze	Deireanne Morales	Taekwondo	Women's 49 kg	October 15
Bronze	Sandra Uptagrafft	Shooting	Women's 10 metre air pistol	October 16
Bronze	Olivia Blatchford; Maria Ubina	Squash	Women's doubles	October 16
Bronze	Marcus Titus	Swimming	Men's 100 metre breaststroke	October 16
Bronze	Ariel Hsing; Lily Zhang; Erica Wu	Table Tennis	Women's team	October 16
Bronze	Terrence Jennings	Taekwondo	Men's 68 kg	October 16
Bronze	Nicole Palma	Taekwondo	Women's 57 kg	October 16
Bronze	Eva Lee; Paula Lynn Obañana	Badminton	Women's doubles	October 18
Bronze	Howard Bach; Paula Lynn Obañana	Badminton	Mixed doubles	October 18
Bronze	Jessica Bogdanov; Megan Frolich; Aimee Gupta; Michelle Pryzbylo; Sofya Roytburg; Sydney Sachs	Gymnastics	Women's rhythmic group 3 ribbons + 2 hoops	October 18
Bronze	Alaina Williams	Gymnastics	Women's trampoline	October 18
Bronze	Chelsea Smith; Michelle Sescher	Rowing	Women's lightweight double sculls	October 18
Bronze	Kayle Browning	Shooting	Women's trap	October 18
Bronze	Stephen Lambdin	Taekwondo	Men's +80 kg	October 18
Bronze	Lauren Cahoon	Taekwondo	Women's +67 kg	October 18
Bronze	Marisa Festerling	Equestrian	Individual dressage	October 19
Bronze	Catherine Reddick; Megan Walsh; Chelsea Smith; Michelle Sescher	Rowing	Women's quadruple sculls	October 19
Bronze	Michale McPhail	Shooting	Men's 50 metre rifle prone	October 19
Bronze	Dana Feiss	Cycling	Women's keirin	October 20
Bronze	Graham Bassett; Christopher Gordon; Julian Illingworth	Squash	Men's team	October 20
Bronze	Olivia Blatchford; Maria Ubina	Squash	Women's team	October 20
Bronze	Christopher Brady	Swimming	Men's 100 metre butterfly	October 20
Bronze	Michelle McKeehan	Swimming	Women's 200 metre breaststroke	October 20
Bronze	Ariel Hsing	Table Tennis	Women's singles	October 20
Bronze	Lily Zhang	Table Tennis	Women's singles	October 20
Bronze	United States women's national volleyball team: Keao Burdine; Angela Forsett; Cynthia Barboza; Alexandra Klineman; Regan Hood; Cassidy Litchman; Lauren Gibbermeyer; Jessica Jones; Carli Lloyd; Courtney Thompson; Kayla Banwart; Tamari Miyashiro	Volleyball	Women's tournament	October 20
Bronze	Glenn Garrison	Wrestling	Men's Greco-Roman 66 kg	October 20
Bronze	Christopher Crowther; Shane Vanderson	Racquetball	Men's doubles	October 21
Bronze	Rhonda Rajsich	Racquetball	Women's singles	October 21
Bronze	Ryan Murphy	Swimming	Men's 200 metre backstroke	October 21
Bronze	Madison Kennedy	Swimming	Women's 50 metre freestyle	October 21
Bronze	Christina McHale	Tennis	Women's singles	October 21
Bronze	Sarah Beard	Shooting	Women's 50 metre rifle three positions	October 22
Bronze	Christine Jennings	Swimming	Women's 10 kilometre marathon	October 22
Bronze	Nicholas Monroe; Greg Ouelette	Tennis	Men's doubles	October 22
Bronze	Bruce Davidson Jr.	Equestrian	Individual eventing	October 23
Bronze	Farrah Hall	Sailing	Women's sailboard	October 23
Bronze	Paige Railey	Sailing	Women's Laser Radial class	October 23
Bronze	Regina Jacuqess	Water skiing	Women's tricks	October 23
Bronze	Teyon Ware	Wrestling	Men's freestyle 66 kg	October 23
Bronze	Becky Holliday	Athletics	Women's pole vault	October 24
Bronze	Amber Campbell	Athletics	Women's hammer throw	October 24
Bronze	Jeremy Hicks	Athletics	Men's long jump	October 25
Bronze	Donothan Bailey; C. J. Maestas; Tyler Mizoguchi; Sho Nakamori; Paul Ruggeri; Brandon Wynn	Gymnastics	Men's artistic team all-around	October 25
Bronze	Chad Vaughn	Weightlifting	Men's 77 kg	October 25
Bronze	Kendrick Farris	Weightlifting	Men's 85 kg	October 25
Bronze	Roger Etchevers	Basque pelota	Men's mano singles trinkete	October 26
Bronze	Anthony Turner	Judo	Men's +100 kg	October 26
Bronze	Michelle Carter	Athletics	Women's shot put	October 27
Bronze	C. J. Maestas	Gymnastics	Men's individual rings	October 27
Bronze	Donny Shankle	Weightlifting	Men's 105 kg	October 27
Bronze	Calesio Newman; Jeremy Dodson; Rubin Williams; Monzavous Edwards; Perrisan White^{*}	Athletics	Men's 4 × 100 metres relay	October 28
Bronze	Hana Carmichael	Judo	Women's 57 kg	October 28
Bronze	Christal Ransom	Judo	Women's 63 kg	October 28
Bronze	Margaret Hogan; Kaitlyn McElroy	Canoeing	Women's K-2 500 metres	October 29
Bronze	Ryan Dolan	Canoeing	Men's K-1 200 metres	October 29
Bronze	Kassidy Cook; Cassidy Krug	Diving	Women's 3 m synchronized springboard	October 29
Bronze	Aaron Kunihiro	Judo	Men's 60 kg	October 29
Bronze	Angelica Delgado	Judo	Women's 52 kg	October 29
Bronze	Angela Woolsey	Judo	Women's 48 kg	October 29
Bronze	United States men's national basketball team: Blake Ahearn; Brian Butch; Justin Dentmon; Jerome Dyson; Moses Ehambe; Marcus Lewis; Leo Lyons; Renaldo Major; Donald Sloan; Gregory Stiemsma; Curtis Sumpter; Lance Thomas	Basketball	Men's tournament	October 30
Bronze	United States national rugby sevens team: Mark Bokhoven; Colin Hawley; Rocco Mauer; Folau Niua; Milemote Pulu; Nu'u Punimuta; Blaine Scully; Roland Suniula; Shalom Suniula; Zachary Test; Peter Tiberio; Maka Unufe	Rugby sevens	Men's tournament	October 30

== Archery ==
The United States has qualified a team of 6 athletes, 3 male and 3 female. The representatives were selected at a qualification event at the National Target Championships.

Men

Athlete	Event	Ranking round		Round of 32	Round of 16	Quarterfinals	Semifinals	Final	Rank
Athlete	Event	Score	Seed	Opposition Score	Opposition Score	Opposition Score	Opposition Score	Opposition Score	Rank
Brady Ellison	Men's individual	1356 PR	1	Ramos (ECU); W 7–1	Ticas (ESA); W 6–0	Malave (VEN); W 6–0	Serrano (MEX); W 6–2	Duenas (CAN); W 6–4	1st place, gold medalist(s)
Joe Fanchin	Men's individual	1324	5	Vilchez (VEN); L 4–6	Did not advance				
Jake Kaminski	Men's individual	1305	10	Emilio (BRA); W 6–0	Lyon (CAN); W 7–3	Duenas (CAN); L 0–6	Did not advance		
Brady Ellison; Joe Fanchin; Jake Kaminski	Men's team	3985 PR	1	—N/a	Bye	El Salvador; W 224–220	Cuba; W 227 PR–215	Mexico; W 220–210	1st place, gold medalist(s)

Women

Athlete	Event	Ranking round		Round of 32	Round of 16	Quarterfinals	Semifinals	Final	Rank
Athlete	Event	Score	Seed	Opposition Score	Opposition Score	Opposition Score	Opposition Score	Opposition Score	Rank
Miranda Leek	Women's individual	1361	2	Moraga (CHI); W 6–0	Ruiz (PUR); W 7–1	Vrakking (CAN); W 6–2	Román (MEX); W 6–2	Alejandra (MEX); L 2–6	2nd place, silver medalist(s)
Khatuna Lorig	Women's individual	1326	4	Echavarria (COL); W 6–2	Ramirez (COL); L 5–6	Did not advance			
Heather Koehl	Women's individual	1269	10	Deschamps (CHI); W 6–5	Vrakking (CAN); L 4–6	Did not advance			
Miranda Leek; Khatuna Lorig; Heather Koehl	Women's team	3956	2	—N/a	Bye	Chile; W 202–201	Venezuela; W 211–204	Mexico; L 204–215	2nd place, silver medalist(s)

== Athletics ==
The United States will be represented in the athletics competition.

Men
Track and road events

Athlete	Event	Preliminaries		Semifinal		Final	
Athlete	Event	Time	Rank	Time	Rank	Time	Rank
Monzavous Edwards	100 m	10.53	4	Did not advance			
Calesio Newman	100 m	10.30	2 Q	10.42	4 Q	10.13	6
Calesio Newman	200 m	20.86	2 Q	20.80	4	Did not advance	
Perrisan White	200 m	21.05	5 Q	20.78	6	Did not advance	
Joshua Scott	400 m	—N/a		46.09	4	Did not advance	
Tyler Mulder	800 m	—N/a		1:49.65	1 Q	1:46.46	4
Mark Wieczorek	800 m	—N/a		1:48.32	2 Q	1:47.75	5
Andrew Acosta	1500 m	—N/a				3:55.27	5
William Leer	1500 m	—N/a				4:04.13	14
Brandon Bethke	5000 m	—N/a				14:17.31	5
Stephen Furst	5000 m	—N/a				14:21.94	8
James Strang	10,000 m	—N/a				29:51.93	4
Ryan Vail	10,000 m	—N/a				29:52.04	5
Dominic Berger	110 m hurdles	—N/a		13.62	2 Q	13.65	7
Jeffery Porter	110 m hurdles	—N/a		13.47	3 Q	13.45	4
Reuben McCoy	400 m hurdles	—N/a		50.60	3 Q	50.18	7
Lee Moore	400 m hurdles	—N/a		50.58	3 Q	51.10	8
Donald Cowart	3000 m steeplechase	—N/a				8:49.97	4
Derek Scott	3000 m steeplechase	—N/a				8:55.03	6
Calesio Newman; Jeremy Dodson; Rubin Williams; Monzavous Edwards; Perrisan White^{*}	4 × 100 m relay	—N/a		39.19	1 Q	39.17	3rd place, bronze medalist(s)
Joshua Scott; Reuben McCoy; Bryan Miller; Lee Moore; Jeremy Dodson^{*} Perrisan White^{*}	4 × 400 m relay	—N/a		3:07.57	3 Q	3:03.91	4
Jeffrey Eggleston	Marathon	—N/a				DNF	
Patrick Rizzo	Marathon	—N/a				2:21:58	8
Michael Mannozzi	20 km walk	—N/a				1:41.33	12
John Nunn	20 km walk	—N/a				1:26.30	8
Benjamin Shorey	50 km walk	—N/a				4:3:35	9
David Talcott	50 km walk	—N/a				DSQ	

^{*}-Indicates athletes that participated in the preliminaries but not the finals

Field events

Athlete	Event	Preliminaries		Final	
Athlete	Event	Result	Rank	Result	Rank
Jim Dilling	High jump	—N/a		2.21	7
Jamie Nieto	High jump	—N/a		2.21	6
Jeremy Scott	Pole vault	—N/a		5.60	2nd place, silver medalist(s)
Nick Mossberg	Pole vault	—N/a		NM	–
Randall Flimmons	Long jump	7.69	6 Q	7.71	7
Jeremy Hicks	Long jump	7.53	5 Q	7.83	(bronze) ^{*}
Chris Carter	Triple jump	—N/a		16.21	6
Zedric Thomas	Triple jump	—N/a		16.19	8
Noah Bryant	Shot put	—N/a		19.23	6
Russell Winger	Shot put	—N/a		19.11	8
Jarred Rome	Discus throw	—N/a		61.71	2nd place, silver medalist(s)
Jason Young	Discus throw	—N/a		60.91	5
Michael Mai	Hammer throw	—N/a		72.71	2nd place, silver medalist(s)
Kibwe Johnson	Hammer throw	—N/a		79.63 PR	1st place, gold medalist(s)
Sean Furey	Javelin throw	—N/a		77.05	4
Cyrus Hostetler	Javelin throw	—N/a		82.24	2nd place, silver medalist(s)

^{*} – Hicks finished 4th in the competition but the original gold medalist, Víctor Castillo of Venezuela, was disqualified on November 9, 2011, after he tested positive for performance-enhancing drugs.

Combined events – Decathlon

Athlete	Event	100 m	LJ	SP	HJ	400 m	110H	DT	PV	JT	1500 m	Final	Rank
Mark Jellison	Result	11.42	7.30	13.80	1.96	53.17	14.49	38.69	NM	51.31	4:56.52	6550	11
Mark Jellison	Points	769	886	716	767	674	912	638	0	608	580	6550	11
Matthew Johnson	Result	10.68	7.28	13.23	NM	48.80	14.77	41.48	4.30	59.20	4:59.60	6929	10
Matthew Johnson	Points	940	881	681	0	871	878	695	702	726	562	6929	10

Women
Track and road events

Athlete	Event	Preliminaries		Semifinal		Final	
Athlete	Event	Result	Rank	Result	Rank	Result	Rank
Barbara Pierre	100 m	—N/a		11.37	1 Q	11.25	2nd place, silver medalist(s)
Kenyanna Wilson	100 m	—N/a		11.74	3	Did not advance	
Leslie Cole	200 m	—N/a		23.55	4 Q	23.46	7
Consuella Moore	200 m	—N/a		24.23	6	Did not advance	
Leslie Cole	400 m	—N/a		53.38	7	Did not advance	
Jessica Cousins	400 m	—N/a		54.38	6	Did not advance	
Heather Kampf	800 m	—N/a				2:07.11	6
Christina Rodgers	800 m	—N/a				2:08.29	7
Jacqueline Areson	1500 m	—N/a				4:34.23	11
Annick Lamar	1500 m	—N/a				4:32.57	10
Kim Conley	5000 m	—N/a				17:00.90	7
Neely Spence	5000 m	—N/a				17:01.11	8
Annie Bersagel	10000 m	—N/a				35:23.31	4
Cassie Ficken Slade	10000 m	—N/a				36:14.96	7
Yvette Lewis	100 m hurdles	—N/a		12.88	1 Q	12.82	1st place, gold medalist(s)
Mackenzie Hill	400 m hurdles	—N/a		57.82	2 Q	58.08	7
Takecia Jameson	400 m hurdles	—N/a		58.68	3 Q	57.89	6
Mason Cathey	3000 m steeplechase	—N/a				10:19.10	4
Sara Hall	3000 m steeplechase	—N/a				10:03.16	1st place, gold medalist(s)
Kenyanna Wilson; Barbara Pierre; Yvette Lewis; Chastity Riggien	4 × 100 m relay	—N/a				43.10	2nd place, silver medalist(s)
Ciara Short; Leslie Cole; Takecia Jameson; Mackenzie Hill	4 × 400 m relay	—N/a				3:33.42	4
Brett Ely	Marathon	—N/a				DNF	
Camille Herron	Marathon	—N/a				2:51:29	9
Lauren Forgues	20 km walk	—N/a				DNF	
Maria Michta	20 km walk	—N/a				1:38.47	10

Field events

Athlete	Event	Final	
Athlete	Event	Result	Rank
Deirdre Mullen	High jump	1.84	4
Becky Holliday	Pole vault	4.30	3rd place, bronze medalist(s)
Shameka Marshall	Long jump	6.73	2nd place, silver medalist(s)
Tori Polk	Long jump	6.34	7
Yvette Lewis	Triple jump	13.17	7
Crystal Manning	Triple jump	13.53	6
Michelle Carter	Shot put	18.09	3rd place, bronze medalist(s)
Alyssa Hasslen	Shot put	16.56	7
Gia Lewis-Smallwood	Discus throw	57.34	4
Aretha Thurmond	Discus throw	59.53	2nd place, silver medalist(s)
Amber Campbell	Hammer throw	69.93	3rd place, bronze medalist(s)
Keelin Godsey	Hammer throw	67.84	5
Avione Allgood	Javelin throw	50.37	10
Alicia Deshasier	Javelin throw	58.01	1st place, gold medalist(s)

Combined events – Heptathlon

Athlete	Event	100H	HJ	SP	200 m	LJ	JT	800 m	Final	Rank
Bridgette Ingram	Result	14.75	1.65	11.95	27.18	5.38	31.52	2:36.47	4809	11
Bridgette Ingram	Points	875	795	658	697	665	505	614	4809	11

== Badminton ==
The United States has qualified four male and four female athletes. USA Badminton submitted a list of prospective nominees to represent the United States at the Pan American Games, which were subject to approval by the USOC: The final nominees are subject to final approval and include all prospective nominees except Cee Ketpura, who withdrew for personal reasons.

Men

Athlete	Event	Round of 64	Round of 32	Round of 16	Quarterfinals	Semifinals	Final	
Athlete	Event	Opposition Score	Opposition Score	Opposition Score	Opposition Score	Opposition Score	Opposition Score	Rank
Sattawat Pongnairat	Singles	Bye	Valentín (PUR); W 21–12, 21–12	Yang (GUA); L 14–21, 21–13, 16–21	Did not advance			
Howard Bach; Tony Gunawan	Doubles	—N/a		Henry / Pyne (JAM); W 21–12, 21–5	Guerrero / Toledo (CUB); W 21–9, 21–14	López / Muñoz (MEX); W 21–12, 21–12	Ho / Pongnairat (USA); W 21–10, 21–14	1st place, gold medalist(s)
Halim Ho; Sattawat Pongnairat	Doubles	—N/a		De Vinatea / Del Valle (PER); W 17–21, 21–15, 21–13	Arthuso / Paiola (BRA); W 21–17, 21–15	Liu / Ng (CAN); W 22–20, 21–14	Bach / Gunawan (USA); L 10–21, 14–21	2nd place, silver medalist(s)

Women

Athlete	Event	Round of 64	Round of 32	Round of 16	Quarterfinals	Semifinals	Final	
Athlete	Event	Opposition Score	Opposition Score	Opposition Score	Opposition Score	Opposition Score	Opposition Score	Rank
Iris Wang	Singles	Bye	Saravia (GUA); W 21–13, 21–11	Leefmans (SUR); W 21–10, 21–10	Li (CAN); L 15–21, 16–21	Did not advance		
Rena Wang	Singles	Bye	Chaviano (CUB); W 21–10, 21–11	Vicente (BRA); W 21–18, 21–8	Rivero (PER); L 15–21, 19–21	Did not advance		
Iris Wang; Rena Wang	Doubles	—N/a		Saravia / Sotomayor (GUA); W 21–7, 21–6	González / Montero (MEX); W 21–15, 21–10	Gao / Ko (CAN); W 21–10, 10–21, 21–12	Bruce / Li (CAN); L 15–21, 15–21	2nd place, silver medalist(s)
Eva Lee; Paula Lynn Obañana	Doubles	—N/a		Vicente / Vicente (BRA); W 21–7, 21–11	Aicardi / Rivero (PER); W 21–6, 21–11	Bruce / Li (CAN); L 21–12, 16–21, 19–21	Did not advance	3rd place, bronze medalist(s)

Mixed

Athlete	Event	Round of 32	Round of 16	Quarterfinals	Semifinals	Final	
Athlete	Event	Opposition Score	Opposition Score	Opposition Score	Opposition Score	Opposition Score	Rank
Howard Bach; Paula Lynn Obañana	Doubles	Loza / Terán (ECU); W 21–10, 21–5	Javier / Vibieca (DOM); W 21–7, 21–5	Henry / Haldane (JAM); W 21–9, 21–11	Gao / Ng (CAN); L 11–21, 21–19, 14–21	Did not advance	3rd place, bronze medalist(s)
Halim Ho; Eva Lee	Doubles	Bye	Ng / Bruce (CAN); W 21–17, 21–9	Guerrero / Hernández (CUB); W 21–15, 21–13	Pacheco / Rivero (PER); W 21–13, 21–19	Gao / Ng (CAN); L 13–21, 21–9, 17–21	2nd place, silver medalist(s)

== Baseball ==
The United States has qualified a baseball team of twenty athletes to participate. The team will compete in Group A.

=== Team ===
The United States Pan American Games baseball team, which will also be sent to the 2011 IBAF Baseball World Cup, was announced in September. The team is as follows:

Pos.	No.	Player	Date of birth (age)	Bats	Throws	Club
P	17	Pete Andrelczyk	November 10, 1985 (age 40)			(United States) Florida Marlins (AAA)
P	23	Jeff Beliveau	January 17, 1987 (age 39)			(United States) Chicago Cubs (AA)
OF	24	Brett Carroll	October 3, 1982 (age 44)			(United States) Boston Red Sox (AAA)
P	14	Justin Cassel	September 25, 1984 (age 42)			(United States) Chicago White Sox (AAA)
OF	46	Matt Clark	December 10, 1986 (age 39)			(United States) San Diego Padres (AAA)
OF	15	Jordan Danks	August 7, 1986 (age 40)			(United States) Chicago White Sox (AAA)
P	18	Chuckie Fick	November 20, 1985 (age 40)			(United States) St. Louis Cardinals (AAA)
IF	48	Jim Gallagher	September 3, 1985 (age 41)			(United States) Chicago White Sox (AAA)
IF	2	Andrew Garcia	April 22, 1986 (age 40)			(United States) Chicago White Sox (AAA)
C	7	Tuffy Gosewisch	August 17, 1983 (age 43)			(United States) Philadelphia Phillies (AA)
OF	6	Brett Jackson	August 2, 1988 (age 38)			(United States) Chicago Cubs (AAA)
P	35	Jeff Marquez	August 10, 1984 (age 42)			(United States) New York Yankees (AAA)
C	16	James McCann	June 13, 1990 (age 36)			(United States) Detroit Tigers (A)
IF	26	Tommy Mendonca	April 12, 1988 (age 38)			(United States) Texas Rangers (AA)
IF	4	Jordy Mercer	August 27, 1986 (age 40)			(United States) Pittsburgh Pirates (AAA)
P	49	Scott Patterson	June 20, 1979 (age 47)			(United States) Seattle Mariners (AAA)
OF	25	A. J. Pollock	December 5, 1987 (age 38)			(United States) Arizona Diamondbacks (AA)
P	34	Todd Redmond	May 17, 1985 (age 41)			(United States) Atlanta Braves (AAA)
P	29	Matt Shoemaker	September 27, 1986 (age 40)			(United States) Los Angeles Angels (AA)
P	38	Drew Smyly	June 13, 1989 (age 37)			(United States) Detroit Tigers (AA)
IF	30	Joe Thurston	September 29, 1979 (age 47)			(United States) Florida Marlins (AAA)
IF	28	Chad Tracy	July 4, 1985 (age 41)			(United States) Texas Rangers (AAA)
P	45	Andy Van Hekken	July 31, 1979 (age 47)			(United States) Houston Astros (AAA)
P	47	Randy Williams	September 18, 1975 (age 51)			(United States) Boston Red Sox (AAA)

General Manager: Eric Campbell
Manager: Ernie Young
Coaches: Kirk Champion – Pitching Coach; Leon Durham – Hitting Coach; Jay Bell, Roly de Armas – Assistant Coaches
Head Athletic Trainer: John Fierro; Assistant Athletic Trainer: Christopher Gebeck; Team Physicians: Fred Dicke, Angelo Mattalino

=== Standings ===
Pos	Team	W	L	RF	RA	RD	PCT	GB	Qualification
1	Mexico (H)	3	0	8	5	+3	1.000	—	Advance to Semifinals
2	United States	2	1	33	5	+28	.667	1	Advance to Semifinals
3	Dominican Republic	1	2	12	29	−17	.333	2	
4	Panama	0	3	7	21	−14	.000	3	

(H) Hosts

=== Results ===
==== Preliminary round ====
Team	1	2	3	4	5	6	7	8	R	H	E
Dominican Republic	0	0	0	0	0	0	2	0	2	6	2
United States ◄	2	0	0	2	4	0	2	10	20	19	3
WP: Andrew van Hekken (1–0) LP: Mario Alvarez Ysabel (0–1) Sv: None; Home runs: DOM: None; USA: Jordan Danks (1), James Gosewisch (1), Brett Carroll (1), James Gallagher (1) http://200.57.183.69/ENG/BB/BBR173A_BBM40040010100002ENG.htm

Team	1	2	3	4	5	6	7	R	H	E
United States ◄	2	0	0	6	1	2	X	11	10	0
Panama	0	0	0	0	0	0	0	0	5	1
WP: Drew Smyly (1–0) LP: Eliecer Navarro (0–1) Sv: None; Home runs: USA: Brett Carroll (1), Tommy Mendonca (1); PAN: None; Boxscore

Team	1	2	3	4	5	6	7	8	9	R	H	E
Mexico ◄	0	0	2	1	0	0	0	0	X	3	5	0
United States	0	0	1	0	0	0	1	0	0	2	5	0
WP: Rolando Valdez (1–0) LP: Jeffrey Marquez (0–1) Sv: Alan Guerrero (2); Home runs: MEX: Román Solís (1); USA: None http://200.57.183.69/ENG/BB/BBR173A_BBM40040010100006ENG.htm

==== Semifinal ====
Team	1	2	3	4	5	6	7	8	9	R	H	E
Cuba	0	0	2	2	0	2	1	3	0	10	15	1
United States ◄	0	5	2	5	0	0	0	0	0	12	11	1
WP: Randy Williams (1–0) LP: Freddy Álvarez (0–1) Sv: Scott Patterson (1); Home runs: CUB: Rudy Reyes (1); USA: None; Boxscore

==== Final ====
Team	1	2	3	4	5	6	7	8	9	R	H	E
Canada ◄	0	0	0	0	0	2	0	0	0	2	7	0
United States	1	0	0	0	0	0	0	0	0	1	6	0
WP: Andrew Albers (1–0) LP: Andrew Van Hekken (1–1) Sv: Scott Richmond (1); Home runs: CAN: None; USA: None http://200.57.183.69/ENG/BB/BBR173A_BBM40040040100001ENG.htm

Final rank: (silver)

== Basketball ==
Both the men's and women's teams of the United States qualified for the basketball tournament automatically.

=== Men ===
Instead of sending college-level basketball players to represent the United States, USA Basketball has decided to work with the NBA Development League (NBA D-League), the minor league of the NBA, to send D-League players to represent the United States in the men's tournament. The men's team will be headed by coach Nate Tibbetts, the head coach of the Tulsa 66ers.

The men's basketball team will compete in Group B.

==== Team ====
The roster of the men's basketball team is as follows:

United States National Basketball Team roster
Players
Coaches

Pos.	No.	Name	Age – Date of birth	Height	Club	Ctr.
G		Blake Ahearn	27 – May 27, 1984	6 ft 2 in (1.88 m)	Erie BayHawks	(United States)
C		Brian Butch	26 – December 22, 1984	6 ft 11 in (2.11 m)		(United States)
G		Justin Dentmon	26 – September 5, 1985	6 ft 0 in (1.83 m)	Texas Legends	(United States)
G		Jerome Dyson	24 – May 1, 1987	6 ft 3 in (1.91 m)	Tulsa 66ers	(United States)
G		Moses Ehambe	25 – May 22, 1986	6 ft 6 in (1.98 m)	Iowa Energy	(United States)
F		Marcus Lewis	25 – September 5, 1986	6 ft 8 in (2.03 m)	Tulsa 66ers	(United States)
F		Leo Lyons	24 – May 6, 1987	6 ft 9 in (2.06 m)	Austin Toros	(United States)
F		Renaldo Major	29 – May 7, 1982	6 ft 6 in (1.98 m)	Dakota Wizards	(United States)
G		Donald Sloan	26 – January 15, 1985	6 ft 3 in (1.91 m)	Reno Bighorns	(United States)
C		Gregory Stiemsma	26 – September 26, 1985	6 ft 11 in (2.11 m)	Sokhumi Tbilisi	(Georgia (country))
F		Curtis Sumpter	27 – January 30, 1984	6 ft 7 in (2.01 m)	Maroussi BC	(Greece)
F		Lance Thomas	23 – August 24, 1988	6 ft 8 in (2.03 m)	Austin Toros	(United States)

Head coach

- (United States) Nate Tibbetts

Assistant coaches

- (United States) Jermaine Byrd
- (United States) Dale Osbourne

Athletic trainer

- (United States) Tony Katzenmeier

Team physician

- (United States) Stephen Foley

Legend

- nat field describes country of
  last club before the tournament
- Age field is age on October 12, 2011

==== Standings ====
Pos	Team	Pld	W	L	PF	PA	PD	Pts	Qualification
1	United States	3	2	1	231	206	+25	5 (Note: United States 77–76 Dominican Republic)	Advance to Semifinals
2	Dominican Republic	3	2	1	231	194	+37	5	Advance to Semifinals
3	Brazil	3	1	2	206	238	−32	4 (Note: Brazil 80–71 Uruguay)	
4	Uruguay	3	1	2	214	244	−30	4	

==== Preliminary round results ====
26 October
17:30

Report

United States	77–76	Dominican Republic
Scoring by quarter: 20–20, 9–17, 25–20, 23–19
Pts: Thomas 15; Rebs: Thomas 16; Asts: Thomas, Dentmon 3		Pts: Martinez 31; Rebs: Martinez 10; Asts: Soliver 5

CODE Dome, Guadalajara
Referees: Arnoldo Dorame (MEX), Reid Kenyon (CAN), Carlos Dueñas (COL)

27 October
20:00

Report

United States	88–77	Brazil
Scoring by quarter: 19–18, 13–20, 24–23, 32–16
Pts: Ahearn 21; Rebs: Thomas 12; Asts: Dentmon 6		Pts: Santos 16; Rebs: da Rosa, Giovannoni 7 Asts: Santos 7

CODE Dome, Guadalajara
Referees: Juan Jose Fernandez (ARG), Arnoldo Dorame (MEX), Neil Donnelly (CAN)

28 October
17:30

Report

United States	80–82	Uruguay
Scoring by quarter: 29–20, 24–22, 11–20, 16–20
Pts: Dyson 19; Rebs: Lyons 6 Asts: Sloan 3		Pts: Osimani 23; Rebs: Borsellino 8 Asts: Osimani 6

CODE Dome, Guadalajara
Referees: Neil Donnelly (CAN), Carlos Dueñas (COL), Armando Ramos (MEX)

==== Semifinals ====
29 October
13:00

Report

United States	55–71	Mexico
Scoring by quarter: 15–11, 14–23, 12–13, 14–24
Pts: Lyons 13; Rebs: Sloan 8 Asts: Dyson, Sloan 2		Pts: Harris 15; Rebs: Real 9 Asts: Stoll, Harris 4

CODE Dome, Guadalajara
Referees: Mario Aluz (ARG), Americo Rodriguez (VEN), Reid Kenyon (CAN)

==== Bronze medal match ====
29 October
13:00

Report

Dominican Republic	92–94	United States
Scoring by quarter: 28–30, 17–21, 23–17, 24–26
Pts: Garcia 25; Rebs: Garcia, Martinez 9 Asts: Liz 7		Pts: Thomas 14; Rebs: Lewis 7 Asts: Dentmon 5

CODE Dome, Guadalajara
Referees: Roberto Vasquez (PUR), Adrian Vasquez (URU), Arnoldo Dorame (MEX)

Final rank: (bronze)

=== Women ===
The women's basketball team will compete in Group A.

==== Team ====
The roster of the women's basketball team is as follows:

United States National Basketball Team roster
Players
Coaches

Pos.	No.	Name	Age – Date of birth	Height	Club	Ctr.
F		Shante Evans	20 – July 8, 1991	6 ft 0 in (1.83 m)	Hofstra	(United States)
F		Christine Flores	21 – July 27, 1990	6 ft 3 in (1.91 m)	Missouri	(United States)
G		Tavelyn James	21 – February 2, 1990	5 ft 7 in (1.7 m)	Eastern Michigan	(United States)
G		Emilie Johnson	21 – March 19, 1990	5 ft 6 in (1.68 m)	UC Santa Barbara	(United States)
G		Marissa Kastanek	21 – May 31, 1990	5 ft 9 in (1.75 m)	NC State	(United States)
G		Kevi Luper	21 – July 6, 1990	5 ft 10 in (1.78 m)	Oral Roberts	(United States)
G		Valencia McFarland	19 – October 21, 1991	5 ft 4 in (1.63 m)	Mississippi	(United States)
G/F		Katelan Redmon	23 – October 11, 1988	6 ft 1 in (1.85 m)	Gonzaga	(United States)
F		Kayla Standish	21 – November 19, 1989	6 ft 2 in (1.88 m)	Gonzaga	(United States)
F/C		Breanna Stewart	17 – August 27, 1994	6 ft 4 in (1.93 m)	Connecticut	(United States)
G/F		April Sykes	21 – July 30, 1990	6 ft 1 in (1.85 m)	Rutgers	(United States)
C		Averly Warley	24 – May 17, 1987	6 ft 3 in (1.91 m)	Liberty	(United States)

Head coach

- (United States) Ceal Barry

Assistant coaches

- (United States) Jennifer Gillom
- (United States) Debbie Ryan

Athletic trainer

- (United States) Ed Ryan

Team physician

- (United States) Stephen Foley

Legend

- nat field describes country of
  last club before the tournament
- Age field is age on October 12, 2011

==== Preliminary round ====
Pos	Team	Pld	W	L	PF	PA	PD	Pts	Qualification
1	Mexico (H)	3	2	1	192	218	−26	5 (Note: Mexico 76–74 Puerto Rico)	Advance to Semifinals
2	Puerto Rico	3	2	1	222	216	+6	5	Advance to Semifinals
3	Argentina	3	1	2	185	186	−1	4 (Note: Argentina 58–55 United States)	
4	United States	3	1	2	212	191	+21	4	

(H) Hosts
Notes:

21 October
13:00

Report

United States	55–58	Argentina
Scoring by quarter: 19–5, 5–15, 13–22, 18–16
Pts: Stewart 18; Rebs: Stewart 21; Asts: James 2		Pts: Gretter 21; Rebs: Burani 7 Asts: Gretter 5

CODE Dome, Guadalajara
Referees: Neil Donnelly (CAN)
Luz Espinoza (ECU)
Yuliet Mendez (CUB)

22 October
17:30

Report

United States	70–75	Puerto Rico
Scoring by quarter: 25–14, 8–19, 18–16, 19–26
Pts: Stewart 14; Rebs: Stewart, Evans 11; Asts: Redmon 3		Pts: Sepulveda 21; Rebs: Sepulveda, Placido 6 Asts: Cortijo 5

CODE Dome, Guadalajara
Referees: Reid Kenyon (CAN)
Adrián Fernández (CUB)
Vanesa Williams (LCA)

23 October
20:00

Report

United States	87–58	Mexico
Scoring by quarter: 10–14, 17–16, 35–15, 25–13
Pts: Stewart 17; Rebs: Redmon 10; Asts: Johnson, Stewart, Luper 3		Pts: Gomez 17; Rebs: Gutierrez 6 Asts: Garcia 5

CODE Dome, Guadalajara
Referees: Adrian Vazquez (URU)
Americo Rodriguez (VEN)
Karla Diniz (BRA)

==== Seventh place game ====
24 October
10:30

Report

United States	87–41	Jamaica
Scoring by quarter: 24–11, 28–6, 19–15, 16–9
Pts: James 19; Rebs: Evans, Warley 10; Asts: James, Kastanek 5		Pts: Jackson 19; Rebs: Jackson 10; Asts: Lamonth 3

CODE Dome, Guadalajara
Referees: Armando Ramos (MEX)
Luz Espinosa (ECU)
Carlos Dueñas (COL)

Final rank: 7

== Basque pelota ==
The United States has qualified a total of six athletes for four of the ten basque pelota events.

Men

Athlete	Event	Preliminary round				Finals	
Athlete	Event	Match 1	Match 2	Match 3	Match 4	Finals	
Athlete	Event	Opposition Score	Opposition Score	Opposition Score	Opposition Score	Opposition Score	Rank
Roger Etchevers	Mano singles trinkete	Maidana (ARG); W 15–2, 15–7	Lopez (MEX); L 2–15, 3–15	Povea (CUB); L 9–15, 12–15	—N/a	Bronze final Maidana (ARG); W 15–1, 15–1	3rd place, bronze medalist(s)
Roberto Huarte	Mano singles 36m fronton	Comas (ARG); W 10–1, 10–1	Medina (MEX); L 0–10, 0–10	Urcelay (VEN); W 10–0, 10–3	—N/a	Medina (MEX); L 2–10, 2–10	2nd place, silver medalist(s)
Tony Huarte; Jose Huarte	Mano doubles 36m fronton	Mikkan / Varrone (ARG); W 10–1, 10–1	Alcantara / Diaz (MEX); L 4–10, 2–10	Leiva / Moya (CUB); W 9–10, 10–7, 5–2	—N/a	Alcantara / Diaz (MEX); W 4–10, 3–10	2nd place, silver medalist(s)
Aaron Tejeda; Daniel Delgado	Frontenis pairs 30m fronton	Alonso / Arocha (CUB); L 6–12, 12–11, 0–5	Alberdi / Clementin (ARG); W 12–6, 12–10	Rodriguez / Rodriguez (MEX); L 2–12, 4–12	Trucco / Versluys (CHI); W 12–5, 12–9	Bronze final Alberdi / Clementin (ARG); L 12–8, 11–12, 1–5	4

== Beach volleyball ==
The United States has qualified one pair of athletes each for the men's and women's tournaments.

Men

Athlete	Event	Preliminary round (3)		Elimination rounds			
Athlete	Event	Preliminary round (3)		Quarterfinals	Semifinals	Final	Standing
Athlete	Event	Opposition Score	Rank	Opposition Score	Opposition Score	Opposition Score	Standing
Mark Van Zwieten; Andrew Fuller	Doubles	Hernández – Mussa (VEN); L 1 – 2 Medrano – Vargas (ESA); W 2 – 0 Grimalt – Grimalt (CHI); W 2 – 0	2	Etchgaray – Suarez (ARG); L 0 – 2	Did not advance		

Women

Athlete	Event	Preliminary round (3)		Elimination rounds			
Athlete	Event	Preliminary round (3)		Quarterfinals	Semifinals	Final	Standing
Athlete	Event	Opposition Score	Rank	Opposition Score	Opposition Score	Opposition Score	Standing
Emily Day; Heather Hughes	Doubles	Rivas – Pazlivek (CHI); W 2 – 0 Orellana – Ramírez (GUA); W 2 – 1 Galindo – Galindo (COL); W 2 – 0	1	Gómez – Guigou (URU); W 2 – 0	Candelas – García (MEX); L 0 – 2	Bronze final Santiago – Yantin (PUR); L 1–2	4

== Bowling ==
The United States has qualified four bowlers, two male and two female. The representatives will be chosen based on their performances at the USBC Masters/USBC Queens, at the US Open of Bowling, and at the Pan American Games bowling trials.

=== Men ===
Bill O'Neill and Chris Barnes were the top competitors at the qualification trials and had excellent performances at the USBC Masters and the US Open of Bowling. Based on these performances, they were the top two qualified athletes in the qualification system. They will represent the United States at these Pan American Games in men's bowling.

Individual

Athlete	Event	Qualification															Eighth finals	Quarterfinals	Semifinals	Finals	
Athlete	Event	Block 1 (games 1–6)						Block 2 (games 7–12)						Total	Average	Rank	Eighth finals	Quarterfinals	Semifinals	Finals	
Athlete	Event	1	2	3	4	5	6	7	8	9	10	11	12	Total	Average	Rank	Opposition Scores	Opposition Scores	Opposition Scores	Opposition Scores	Rank
Bill O'Neill	Men's individual	215	276	246	246	290	238	177	213	266	205	222	169	2763	230.3	2	Sebelen (DOM); W 718–561	Mejía (COL); L 589–711	Did not advance		
Chris Barnes	Men's individual	227	243	246	255	290	237	204	204	244	249	203	247	2849	237.4	1	Oliver (CAN); W 655–587	Valverde (CRC); W 760–535	Fernandez (DOM); W 227–235, 191–144, 233–177	Mejía (COL); L 171–189, 193–205	2nd place, silver medalist(s)

Pairs

Athlete	Event	Block 1 (games 1–6)								Block 2 (games 7–12)								Grand total	Final rank
Athlete	Event	1	2	3	4	5	6	Total	Average	7	8	9	10	11	12	Total	Average	Grand total	Final rank
Bill O'Neill; Chris Barnes	Men's pairs	188	210	256	245	173	237	1309	218.2	236	212	205	149	236	166	2513	209.4	5211	1st place, gold medalist(s)
Bill O'Neill; Chris Barnes	Men's pairs	211	202	245	234	227	179	1298	216.3	279	202	213	248	212	246	2698	224.8	5211	1st place, gold medalist(s)

=== Women ===
The United States will be represented by Kelly Kulick and Liz Johnson in the women's bowling competition. The qualification was based on the competitors' performances at the USBC Queens and the US Women's Open of Bowling and on performances at the women's bowling qualification event held during May 2–3. Kulick and Johnson were announced as the representatives following the US Women's Open's conclusion.

Individual

Athlete	Event	Qualification															Eighth finals	Quarterfinals	Semifinals	Finals	
Athlete	Event	Block 1 (games 1–6)						Block 2 (games 7–12)						Total	Average	Rank	Eighth finals	Quarterfinals	Semifinals	Finals	
Athlete	Event	1	2	3	4	5	6	7	8	9	10	11	12	Total	Average	Rank	Opposition Scores	Opposition Scores	Opposition Scores	Opposition Scores	Rank
Kelly Kulick	Women's individual	206	225	216	226	248	255	258	215	171	220	210	194	2644	220.3	1	Martins (BRA); L 587–630	Did not advance			
Liz Johnson	Women's individual	237	249	248	206	222	190	215	204	214	236	205	210	2636	219.7	2	Leon (PUR); W 676–626	Scheer (BRA); W 648–515	Marcano (VEN); W 249–206, 254–203	Park (CAN); W 232–196, 235–190	1st place, gold medalist(s)

Pairs

Athlete	Event	Block 1 (games 1–6)								Block 2 (games 7–12)								Grand total	Final rank
Athlete	Event	1	2	3	4	5	6	Total	Average	7	8	9	10	11	12	Total	Average	Grand total	Final rank
Kelly Kulick; Liz Johnson	Women's pairs	228	202	196	236	206	224	1292	215.3	193	209	247	270	223	190	2624	218.7	5257	1st place, gold medalist(s)
Kelly Kulick; Liz Johnson	Women's pairs	213	203	225	248	194	211	1294	215.7	279	203	208	214	222	213	2633	219.4	5257	1st place, gold medalist(s)

== Boxing ==
The United States has qualified a total of eight athletes to compete in Guadalajara. In the first qualifier, the United States qualified one athlete in the men's super heavyweight category. In the second qualifier, the United States qualified one athlete in the men's light heavyweight category, one athlete in the women's light welterweight category, and one athlete in the women's light heavyweight category. In the third qualifier, the United States qualified four athletes in the men's flyweight, lightweight, welterweight, and middleweight categories.

Men

Athlete	Event	Preliminaries	Quarterfinals	Semifinals	Final	
Athlete	Event	Opposition Result	Opposition Result	Opposition Result	Opposition Result	Rank
John Franklin	Flyweight (-52 kg)	Bye	Ramírez (CUB); L RSC (3–16)	Did not advance		
Toka Kahn-Clary	Lightweight (-60 kg)	Bye	Da Conceicao (BRA); L 6–21	Did not advance		
Damarias Russell	Middleweight (-75 kg)	Correa (CUB); L 4–27	Did not advance			
Jeffrey Spencer	Light heavyweight (-81 kg)	—N/a	La Cruz (CUB); L 2–19	Did not advance		
Danny Kelly	Super Heavyweight (+91 kg)	—N/a	Mena (COL); L 11–13	Did not advance		

Women

Athlete	Event	Quarterfinals	Semifinals	Final	
Athlete	Event	Opposition Result	Opposition Result	Opposition Result	Rank
Christina Cruz	Flyweight (-51 kg)	Valencia (COL); L 4–4 (24–26)	Did not advance		
Quanitta Underwood	Light welterweight (-60 kg)	Tapia (PUR); L 17-17 (41-48)	Did not advance		
Franchon Crews	Light heavyweight (-75 kg)	Spencer (CAN); L 7–17	Did not advance		

== Canoeing ==
The United States has qualified a total of five boats to compete in the K-1 200, K-2 100, K-1 200 women, K-1 500 women, and the K-2 500 women's competition.

Men

Athlete(s)	Event	Heats		Semifinals		Final	
Athlete(s)	Event	Time	Rank	Time	Rank	Time	Rank
Robert Finlayson	C-1 200 m	43.931	5 Q	43.078	2 QF	44.239	8
Robert Finlayson	C-1 1000 m	—N/a				4:34.301	6
Ryan Dolan	K-1 200 m	36.397	2 QF	Bye		36.547	3rd place, bronze medalist(s)
William House	K-1 1000 m	—N/a				3:48.065	6
Ryan Dolan; Timothy Hornsby	K-2 200 m	32.891	2 QF	Bye		33.403	5
Jacob Michael; Luke Michael	K-2 1000 m	—N/a				3:30.577	7
Patrick Dolan; William House; Jacob Michael; Luke Michael	K-4 1000 m	—N/a				3:09.127	7

Women

Athlete(s)	Event	Heats		Semifinals		Final	
Athlete(s)	Event	Time	Rank	Time	Rank	Time	Rank
Carrie Johnson	K-1 200 m	41.827	1 QF	Bye		41.803	1st place, gold medalist(s)
Carrie Johnson	K-1 500 m	1:59.353	1 QF	Bye		1:54.243	1st place, gold medalist(s)
Margaret Hogan; Kaitlyn McElroy	K-2 500 m	1:49.517	1 QF	Bye		1:48.718	3rd place, bronze medalist(s)

== Cycling ==
The United States has qualified sixteen athletes to compete at the cycling competition.

=== Road cycling ===
The United States has qualified three female athletes to compete in the road cycling competition.

Women

Athlete	Event	Time	Rank
Robin Farina	Road race	2:18:23	9
Robin Farina	Time trial	28:25.23	4
Alison Starnes	Time trial	28:26.47	5

=== Track cycling ===
The United States has qualified one team of male athletes to compete in the team sprint track cycling competition.

Sprints

Athlete	Event	Qualifying		1/8 finals (repechage)	Quarterfinals	Semifinals	Final	
Athlete	Event	Time Speed (km/h)	Rank	Opposition Time Speed	Opposition Time Speed	Opposition Time Speed	Opposition Time Speed	Rank
Michael Blatchford	Men's Sprint	9.983; 72.122	2 Q	Horta (MEX); L ( Gatto (ARG); Cipriano (BRA); W 10.449; 68.906)	Phillip (TRI); L	Did not advance	Classification 5-8; 3	7
Jimmy Watkins	Men's Sprint	10.058; 71.584	5 Q	Cipriano (BRA); W 10.549; 68.252	Canelón (VEN); L	Did not advance	Classification 5-8; W 10.637; 67.688	5
Michael Blatchford; Dean Tracy; Jimmy Watkins	Men's team sprint	44.227; 61.048	2 Q	—N/a			Venezuela; L 44.036; 61.313	2nd place, silver medalist(s)
Dana Feiss	Women's sprint	11.503; 62.592	7 Q	—N/a	Guerra (CUB); L	Did not advance	Classification 5-8; 2	6
Elizabeth Carlson; Dana Feiss; Madalyn Godby	Women's team sprint	34.788; 51.741	4 Q	—N/a			Mexico; L 34.993; 51.438	4

Keirin

Athlete	Event	1st round	Repechage	Final
Athlete	Event	Rank	Rank	Rank
Jimmy Watkins	Men's keirin	1 Q	Bye	4
Dana Feiss	Women's keirin	—N/a		3rd place, bronze medalist(s)

=== Mountain biking ===
The United States qualified three athletes, two male and one female, to compete in the mountain biking cycling competition.

Athlete	Event	Time	Rank
Jeremiah Bishop	Men's cross-country	1:32:41	3rd place, bronze medalist(s)
Stephen Ettinger	Men's cross-country	1:44:55	13
Heather Irmiger	Women's cross-country	1:34:09	1st place, gold medalist(s)

=== BMX ===
The United States qualified four athletes, two male and two female, to compete in the BMX cycling competition.

Athlete	Event	Qualification								Semifinals		Final	
Athlete	Event	Race 1		Race 2		Race 3		Total points	Qual. rank	Time	Rank	Time	Rank
Athlete	Event	Time	Points	Time	Points	Time	Points	Total points	Qual. rank	Time	Rank	Time	Rank
Connor Fields	Men's BMX	35.139	1	1:47.577	6	35.286	1	8	3 Q	34.648	1 Q	34.245	1st place, gold medalist(s)
Nic Long	Men's BMX	36.095	1	35.394	1	35.265	1	3	1 Q	35.874	3 Q	34.907	2nd place, silver medalist(s)
Arielle Martin	Women's BMX	43.835	1	43.339	1	41.816	1	3	1 Q	—N/a		42.659	2nd place, silver medalist(s)
Amanda Carr	Women's BMX	45.290	3	44.912	3	44.270	2	8	3 Q	—N/a		2:58.670	8

== Diving ==
The United States will be sending divers to compete in the diving competition.

Men

Athlete(s)	Event	Preliminary		Final	
Athlete(s)	Event	Points	Rank	Points	Rank
Thomas Finchum	10 m platform	472.00	2 Q	451.95	5
Kristian Ipsen	3 m springboard	434.50	7 Q	429.20	6
Drew Livingston	3 m springboard	442.45	4 Q	391.70	10
Thomas Finchum; Drew Livingston	10 m synchronized platform	—N/a		391.92	4
Troy Dumais; Kristian Ipsen	3 m synchronized springboard	—N/a		411.99	2nd place, silver medalist(s)

Women

Athlete(s)	Event	Preliminary		Final	
Athlete(s)	Event	Points	Rank	Points	Rank
Amelia Cozad	10 m platform	279.30	7 Q	260.60	10
Amy Korthauer	10 m platform	309.05	4 Q	262.00	9
Kassidy Cook	3 m springboard	274.70	7 Q	348.90	4
Cassidy Krug	3 m springboard	345.60	1 Q	372.65	2nd place, silver medalist(s)
Kassidy Cook; Cassidy Krug	3 m synchronized springboard	—N/a		319.50	3rd place, bronze medalist(s)
Amelia Cozad; Amy Korthauer	10 m synchronized platform	—N/a		257.16	4

== Equestrian ==
The United States will be sending an equestrian team to compete. The United States Equestrian Federation (USEF) released a short list of riders nominated to represent the United States. The final squad was named and sent to the USOC, IOC and FEI on September 12.

Following is the short list released by the USEF on July 27, including substitutes:

Short List
Athlete	Age	Hometown	Horse	Age	Breed	Sex
Emily Beshear	34	Somerset, Virginia	Here's to You	11	Thoroughbred	F
Hannah Sue Burnett	25	Ocala, Florida	Harbour Pilot	8	Irish Sport Horse	F
William Coleman III	28	Gordonsville, Virginia	Oboe O'Reilly	8	Irish Sport Horse	F
Anna Collier	35	Vancouver, Washington	Upper Crust D	10	KWPN	F
Bruce Davidson Jr.	35	Ocala, Florida	Absolute Liberty	8	Thoroughbred	M
Jonathan Holling	34	Ocala, Florida	Downtown Harrison	7	Trakehner-Thoroughbred Cross	F
Boyd Martin	32	Cochranville, Pennsylvania	Cold Harbor	11	Canadian Sport Horse	F
Maxance McManamy	19	Templeton, California	Project Runway	7	Trakehner	F
Michael Pollard	30	Dalton, Georgia	Schoensgreen Hanni	8	German Sport Horse	M
Kristin Schmolze	28	Califon, New Jersey	Ballylaffin Bracken	11	Irish Sport Horse	F
Alexandra Slusher	24	Auburn, California	Last Call	12	Mecklenberg	M
Tamra Smith	36	Murietta, California	Mar de Amor	11	Selle Français	F
Lynn Symansky	28	Middleburg, Virginia	Donner	8	Thoroughbred	F
Jolie Wentworth	30	Martinez, California,	Good Knight	9	Canadian Sport Horse	
Sharon White	37	Summit Point, West Virginia	Rafferty's Rules	13	AUS WB	
Substitutes
Shannon Lilley	32	Gilroy, California	Ballingowan Pizzaz	9	Irish Sport Horse	F
Alexandra Slusher	24	Auburn, California	Pierre	10	Hanoverian	F
Kevin Keane	56	Kennett Square, Pennsylvania	Fernhill Flutter	9	Irish Sport Horse	F
Jennifer Taxay Kelly	47	Agua Dulce, California	Taboo	7	Thoroughbred	M
Matt Flynn	27	Potomac, Maryland	Breakthrough	7	Irish Sport Horse	F

Following is a list of the final nomination of the USEF and the official entries into the Pan American Games:

Final list (dressage)
Athlete	Horse
Steffen Peters	Weltino's Magic
Heather Blitz	Paragon
Cesar Parra	Grandioso
Marisa Festerling	Big Tyme
Substitutes
Endel Ots	Toscano
Shawna Harding	Rigo
Heather Mason	Warsteiner
Lisa Wilcox	Pikko del Cerro HU

Dressage

Athlete	Horse	Event	Grand Prix		Grand Prix Special		Grand Prix Freestyle		Final score^{1}	Rank
Athlete	Horse	Event	Score	Rank	Score	Rank	Score	Rank	Final score^{1}	Rank
Heather Blitz	Paragon	Individual	75.105	2 Q	77.184	2 Q	86.650	2	81.917	2nd place, silver medalist(s)
Marisa Festerling	Big Tyme	Individual	72.026	4 Q	74.316	3 Q	80.775	3	77.545	3rd place, bronze medalist(s)
Cesar Parra	Grandioso	Individual	69.526	10 Q	72.000	6 Q	DNS	16	–	–
Steffen Peters	Weltino's Magic	Individual	80.132	1 Q	78.079	1 Q	87.300	1	82.690	1st place, gold medalist(s)
Heather Blitz; Marisa Festerling; Cesar Parra; Steffen Peters	as above	Team	74.421	1	—N/a				74.421	1st place, gold medalist(s)

^1 The final score is based on the Grand Prix for the team event and the Grand Prix Special and Grand Prix Freestyle for the individual event.

Final List (Eventing)
Athlete	Horse
Hannah Sue Burnett	Harbour Pilot
Bruce Davidson Jr.	Absolute Liberty
Shannon Lilley	Ballingowan Pizzaz
Michael Pollard	Schoensgreen Hanni
Lynn Symansky	Donner

Eventing

Athlete	Horse	Event	Dressage		Cross-country		Jumping				Total	
Athlete	Horse	Event	Dressage		Cross-country		Qualifier		Final		Total	
Athlete	Horse	Event	Penalties	Rank	Penalties	Rank	Penalties	Rank	Penalties	Rank	Penalties	Rank
Hannah Sue Burnett	Harbour Pilot	Individual	45.20	3	0	1	0	1	0	1	45.20	2nd place, silver medalist(s)
Bruce Davidson Jr.	Absolute Liberty	Individual	48.90	4	0	1	0	1	0	1	48.90	3rd place, bronze medalist(s)
Shannon Lilley	Ballingowan Pizzaz	Individual	49.30	5	0	1	0	1	Did not advance		49.30	20
Michael Pollard	Schoensgreen Hanni	Individual	44.50	2	0	1	0	1	8	14	52.20	4
Lynn Symansky	Donner	Individual	52.20	10	0	1	0	1	Did not advance		52.20	21
Hannah Sue Burnett; Bruce Davidson Jr. Shannon Lilley; Michael Pollard; Lynn Symansky	as above	Team	138.60	1	0	1	0	1	—N/a		138.6	1st place, gold medalist(s)

Individual jumping

Athlete	Horse	Event	Ind. 1st qualifier		Ind. 2nd qualifier			Ind. 3rd qualifier			Ind. Final					
Athlete	Horse	Event	Ind. 1st qualifier		Ind. 2nd qualifier			Ind. 3rd qualifier			Round A		Round B		Total	
Athlete	Horse	Event	Penalties	Rank	Penalties	Total	Rank	Penalties	Total	Rank	Penalties	Rank	Penalties	Rank	Penalties	Rank
Elizabeth Madden	Coral Reef Via Volo	Individual	0.00	1	0.00	0.00	1	0.00	0.00	1	0.00	1	1.00	3	1.00	2nd place, silver medalist(s)
Christine McCrea	Romantovich Take One	Individual	0.88	2	0.00	0.88	2	0.00	0.88	2	0.00	1	0.00	1	0.88	1st place, gold medalist(s)
Mclain Ward	Antares F	Individual	2.02	7	0.00	2.02	4	0.00	2.02	3	0.00	1	4.00	7	6.02	4
Kent Farrington	Uceko	Individual	3.90	15	0.00	3.90	9	0.00	3.90	8	DNS				3.90	27

Team jumping

Athlete	Horse	Event	Qualification round		Final					
Athlete	Horse	Event	Qualification round		Round 1		Round 2		Total	
Athlete	Horse	Event	Penalties	Rank	Penalties	Rank	Penalties	Rank	Penalties	Rank
Elizabeth Madden; Christine McCrea; Mclain Ward; Kent Farrington	as above	Team	2.90	1	0.00	1	0.00	1	2.90	1st place, gold medalist(s)

== Fencing ==
The United States has qualified a total of sixteen athletes, eight male and eight female athletes, to compete in the individual and team events for the épée, foil, and sabre of each gender. The fencers who will be representing the United States are as follows:

Men

Athlete	Event	Round of poules		Round of 16	Quarterfinals	Semifinals	Final	
Athlete	Event	Result	Seed	Opposition Score	Opposition Score	Opposition Score	Opposition Score	Rank
Seth Kelsey	Individual épée	3V – 2D	3	Dominguez (ARG); W 15–8	Inostroza (CHI); W 12–8	Henriquez (CUB); W 13–10	Limardo (VEN); W 12–10	1st place, gold medalist(s)
Soren Thompson	Individual épée	4V – 1D	2	Nickel (CHI); W 15–9	Limardo (VEN); L 11–15	Did not advance		
Seth Kelsey; Cody Mattern; Soren Thompson	Team épée	—N/a			El Salvador; W 45–27	Chile; W 45–26	Venezuela; W 42–25	1st place, gold medalist(s)
Miles Chamley-Watson	Individual foil	5V – 0D	1	Toldo (BRA); L 13–15	Did not advance			
Alexander Massialas	Individual foil	3V – 2D	5	Justiniano (PUR); W 15–4	Arizaga (MEX); W 15–6	Toldo (BRA); W 15–7	Alvear (CHI); W 15–5	1st place, gold medalist(s)
Miles Chamley-Watson; Alexander Massialas; Gerek Meinhardt	Team foil	—N/a			Cuba; W 45–28	Mexico; W 45–37	Canada; W 45–35	1st place, gold medalist(s)
Tim Morehouse	Individual sabre	4V – 1D	3	Contreras (CHI); W 15–10	Iriarte (CUB); W 15–6	Polossifakis (CAN); W 15–9	Beaudry (CAN); L 14–15	2nd place, silver medalist(s)
James Williams	Individual sabre	3V – 2D	2	Beaudry (CAN); L 14–15	Did not advance			
Ben Igoe; Tim Morehouse; James Williams	Team sabre	—N/a			Cuba; W 45–36	Brazil; W 45-36	Canada; W 45–35	1st place, gold medalist(s)

=== Women ===
Athlete	Event	Round of poules		Round of 16	Quarterfinals	Semifinals	Final	
Athlete	Event	Result	Seed	Opposition Score	Opposition Score	Opposition Score	Opposition Score	Rank
Courtney Hurley	Individual épée	4V – 1D	1	di Tella (ARG); W 15–10	Switzer (CAN); W 15–10	Rodriguez (CUB); W 13–12	K. Hurley (USA); L 13–15	2nd place, silver medalist(s)
Kelley Hurley	Individual épée	4V – 1D	2	de Oliveira (BRA); W 15–6	Millan (MEX); W 15–12	Aguero (ARG); W 15–4	C. Hurley (USA); W 15–13	1st place, gold medalist(s)
Lindsay Campbell; Courtney Hurley; Kelley Hurley	Team épée	—N/a			Cuba; W 45–35	Argentina; W 45–17	Canada; W 45–36	1st place, gold medalist(s)
Lee Kiefer	Individual foil	5V – 0D	1	Garcia (CHI); W 15–9	Hernandez (MEX); W 15–7	Michel (MEX); W 15–7	Prescod (USA); W 15–9	1st place, gold medalist(s)
Nzingha Prescod	Individual foil	3V – 2D	2	Silva (CHI); W 15–10	Gonzalez (VEN); W 15–13	Peterson (CAN); W 15–6	Kiefer (USA); L 9–15	2nd place, silver medalist(s)
Lee Kiefer; Nzingha Prescod; Doris Willette	Team foil	—N/a			Bye	Chile; W 45–21	Canada; W 45–24	1st place, gold medalist(s)
Ibtihaj Muhammad	Individual sabre	3V – 2D	5	Larios (MEX); W 15–4	Zagunis (USA); L 4–15	Did not advance		
Mariel Zagunis	Individual sabre	4V – 1D	4	Salazar (CUB); W 15–11	Muhammad (USA); W 15–4	Goulet (CUB); W 15–7	Benítez (VEN); W 15–13	1st place, gold medalist(s)
Ibtihaj Muhammad; Dagmara Wozniak; Mariel Zagunis	Team sabre	—N/a			Cuba; W 45–36	Dominican Republic; W 45–12	Mexico; W 45–29	1st place, gold medalist(s)

== Field hockey ==
The United States has qualified a men's and women's field hockey team to compete in their respective tournaments.

=== Men ===
==== Team ====
The United States men's field hockey team is as follows:

- Kevin Barber
- Pat Cota
- Ajai Dhadwal
- Michiel Dijxhoorn
- John Ginolfi
- Sean Harris
- Will Holt
- Steve Mann
- Jarred Martin
- Shawn Nakamura
- Moritz Runzi
- Ian Scully
- Rob Schilling
- Andy Sheridan
- Tom Sheridan
- Tyler Sundeen

==== Results ====
The United States men's team will compete in Pool B of the men's group.

Pos	Team	Pld	W	D	L	GF	GA	GD	Pts	Qualification
1	Argentina	3	3	0	0	20	1	+19	9	Semi-finals
2	Cuba	3	2	0	1	7	13	−6	6	Semi-finals
3	Mexico (H)	3	1	0	2	4	12	−8	3	
4	United States	3	0	0	3	4	9	−5	0	

Source: PAHF
(H) Hosts

20 October 2011
16:00

United States	2 – 4	Cuba
Holt 35' 38'	Report	Sarduy 19' 49'; Blanco 53'; Perez 56'
Schilling 8'	≪ Discipline ≫	Rojas 31'; Garcia 15'

Umpires:
Arthur John Wright (RSA), Lim Hong Zhen (SIN)

22 October 2011
11:00

United States	0 – 2	Argentina
	Report	Bergner 34'; López 52'
Barber 46'	≪ Discipline ≫

Umpires:
Christopher Wilson (CAN), Arthur John Wright (RSA)

24 October 2011
16:00

Mexico	3 – 2	United States
Aguilar 7'; Aguayo 18'; Campillo 20'	Report	Dijxhoorn 3'; Barber 29'
Campillo 52'; Pedraza 65'; Aguayo 69'	≪ Discipline ≫

Umpires:
Devin Hooper (GUY), Daniel Lopez (URU)

==== 5th-8th semifinal ====
27 October 2011
19:30

Trinidad and Tobago	0 – 2	United States
	Report	Sundeen 33' 63'
	≪ Discipline ≫	Harris 31'; Scally 68'; Mann 70'

Umpires:
Jamar Springer (BAR), Maximiliano Scala (ARG)

==== 5th place match ====
29 October 2011
11:30

United States	6 – 0	Mexico
Holt 2' 43'; Runzi 12'; Sundeen 29'; Martin 45'; Harris 64'	Report
Mann 48'	≪ Discipline ≫	Aguilar 11'; Garcia 48'

Umpires:
Maximiliano Scala (ARG), Lim Hong Zhen (SIN)

Final rank: 5

=== Women ===
==== Team ====
The United States women's field hockey team is as follows:

- Kayla Bashore-Smedley
- Michelle Cesan
- Lauren Crandall
- Rachel Dawson
- Katelyn Falgowski
- Melissa Gonzalez
- Michelle Kasold
- Claire Laubach
- Caroline Nichols
- Katie O'Donnell
- Julia Reinprecht
- Katie Reinprecht
- Paige Selenski
- Amy Swensen
- Shannon Taylor
- Michelle Vittese

==== Results ====
The United States women's team will compete in Pool B of the women's group.

Team	Pld	W	D	L	GF	GA	GD	Pts
United States (A)	3	3	0	0	16	1	+15	9
Chile (A)	3	2	0	1	8	2	+6	6
Cuba	3	1	0	2	3	16	−13	3
Mexico	3	0	0	3	1	9	−8	0

(A) Advanced to the semifinals

October 19, 2011
14:00

United States	5 – 0	Mexico
Reinprecht 9' 11'; Taylor 31'; Laubach 37'; O'Donnell 52'	Report
	≪ Discipline ≫	Paredes 48'; Correa 65'

Pan American Hockey Stadium
Umpires:
Huyton (GBR), Villafañe (ARG)

21 October 2011
11:00

Chile	1 – 2	United States
Caram 46'	Report	Taylor 41'; Nichols 42'
Caram 23' 69'; Villagra 69'	≪ Discipline ≫	Falgowski 16'

Pan American Hockey Stadium
Umpires:
De La Fuente (ARG), Perez (USA)

23 October 2011
14:00

United States	9 – 0	Cuba
O'Donnell 2' 44'; Laubach 15' 17'; Nichols 21' 33'; Falgowski 26'; Kasold 46'; Selenski 55'	Report
	≪ Discipline ≫	Duquernes 33'

Pan American Hockey Stadium
Umpires:
Hudson (NZL), Villafañe (ARG)

==== Semifinals ====
26 October 2011
15:00

United States	4 – 2	Canada
Laubach 9' 43'; Cesan 21'; Kasold 58'	Report	Stairs 7' 45'
Gey 33'; Vittese 38'	≪ Discipline ≫	Wishart 18'

Pan American Hockey Stadium

==== Gold medal match ====
28 October 2011
15:00

Argentina	2 – 4	United States
Barrionuevo 19' 42'	Report	Selenski 14'; Taylor 16'; O'Donnell 25'; Vittese 66'
D'Elia 35'	≪ Discipline ≫	Crandall 26'; Kasold 47'

Pan American Hockey Stadium

Final rank: (gold)

2011 Pan American Games Gold Medal

United States

== Gymnastics ==
The United States has qualified a total of 24 athletes in 3 events.

=== Artistic ===
The United States has qualified six male and six female athletes in artistic gymnastics.

Men
Team

Athlete	Apparatus						All-around	
Athlete	Vault	Floor	Pommel horse	Rings	Parallel bars	Horizontal bar	Total	Rank
Donothan Bailey	14.950	14.550	13.900	13.450	—N/a	12.200	69.050	35
C. J. Maestas	15.200	13.050	12.450	14.800 Q	13.700	14.350 Q	83.550 Q	9
Tyler Mizoguchi	15.800	14.550 Q	13.250	14.000	12.500	—N/a	70.100	33
Sho Nakamori	—N/a	—N/a	12.750	13.600	14.600 Q	14.050	55.00	43
Paul Ruggeri	16.100 Q	14.550 Q	—N/a	—N/a	14.450 Q	15.200 Q	60.300	39
Brandon Wynn	14.500	11.55	12.500	14.900 Q	13.000	14.200	80.650 Q	20
Team totals	62.050	56.700	52.400	57.300	55.750	57.800	342.000	3rd place, bronze medalist(s)

Individual

Athlete	Event	Final							
Athlete	Event	Floor	Pommel horse	Rings	Vault	Parallel bars	Horizontal bar	Total	Rank
C. J. Maestas	Individual all-around	14.650	13.200	14.850	15.100	13.850	13.650	85.300	4
C. J. Maestas	Individual rings	—N/a		15.550	—N/a			15.550	3rd place, bronze medalist(s)
C. J. Maestas	Individual horizontal bar	—N/a					14.175	14.175	7
Brandon Wynn	Individual all-around	12.500	12.250	15.200	15.250	13.350	14.100	82.650	8
Brandon Wynn	Individual rings	—N/a		15.625	—N/a			15.625	1st place, gold medalist(s)
Tyler Mizoguchi	Individual floor	14.125	—N/a					14.125	7
Paul Ruggeri	Individual floor	11.400	—N/a					11.400	8
Paul Ruggeri	Individual vault	—N/a			14.862	—N/a		14.862	7
Paul Ruggeri	Individual parallel bars	—N/a				14.825	—N/a	14.825	2nd place, silver medalist(s)
Paul Ruggeri	Individual horizontal bar	—N/a					15.650	15.650	1st place, gold medalist(s)
Sho Nakamori	Individual parallel bars	—N/a				13.475	—N/a	13.475	8

Women
Team

Athlete	Apparatus				All-around	
Athlete	Vault	Uneven bars	Balance beam	Floor	Total	Rank
Bridgette Caquatto	13.925	14.625 Q	12.975	12.775	54.300	4 Q
Jessie DeZiel	15.125	—N/a	13.275	13.150 Q	41.550	43
Brandie Jay	14.925 Q	13.725	13.125	12.375	54.150	5 Q
Shawn Johnson	14.925	14.400 Q	12.875	—N/a	42.200	41
Grace McLaughlin	14.225	13.350	13.250	11.675	52.500	16
Bridget Sloan	—N/a	13.850	—N/a	13.025	26.875	50
Team totals	59.200	56.600	52.625	51.325	219.750	1st place, gold medalist(s)

Individual

Athlete	Event	Final					
Athlete	Event	Vault	Uneven bars	Balance beam	Floor	Total	Rank
Bridgette Caquatto	Individual all-around	14.075	14.725	13.675	13.400	55.875	1st place, gold medalist(s)
Bridgette Caquatto	Individual uneven bars	—N/a	14.525	—N/a		14.525	1st place, gold medalist(s)
Brandie Jay	Individual all-around	14.825	13.975	12.850	12.700	54.350	6
Brandie Jay	Individual vault	14.337	—N/a			14.337	1st place, gold medalist(s)
Shawn Johnson	Individual uneven bars	—N/a	14.500	—N/a		14.500	2nd place, silver medalist(s)
Jessie DeZiel	Individual floor	—N/a			13.325	13.325	6

=== Rhythmic ===
The United States has qualified two athletes to compete in the individual tournament and six athletes to compete in the group tournament.

Women

Individual

Athlete	Event	Final					
Athlete	Event	Hoop	Ball	Clubs	Ribbon	Total	Rank
Shelby Kisiel	Individual all-around	22.225	22.925 Q	24.800 Q	22.550	92.500	7
Shelby Kisiel	Ball	—N/a	24.300	—N/a		24.300	5
Shelby Kisiel	Clubs	—N/a		23.300	—N/a	23.300	7
Julie Zetlin	Individual all-around	25.400 Q	24.925 Q	25.300 Q	25.225 Q	100.85	1st place, gold medalist(s)
Julie Zetlin	Hoop	25.500	—N/a			25.500	2nd place, silver medalist(s)
Julie Zetlin	Ball	—N/a	24.950	—N/a		24.950	1st place, gold medalist(s)
Julie Zetlin	Clubs	—N/a		24.075	—N/a	24.075	5
Julie Zetlin	Ribbon	—N/a			25.775	25.775	1st place, gold medalist(s)

Group

Athletes	Event	Final			
Athletes	Event	5 balls	3 ribbons & 2 hoops	Total	Rank
Jessica Bogdanov; Megan Frohlich; Aimee Gupta; Michelle Przybylo; Sofya Roytburg; Sydney Sachs	Group all-around	23.600 Q	23.225 Q	46.825	4
Jessica Bogdanov; Megan Frohlich; Aimee Gupta; Michelle Przybylo; Sofya Roytburg; Sydney Sachs	5 balls	24.850	—N/a	24.850	2nd place, silver medalist(s)
Jessica Bogdanov; Megan Frohlich; Aimee Gupta; Michelle Przybylo; Sofya Roytburg; Sydney Sachs	3 ribbons + 2 hoops	—N/a	24.625	24.625	3rd place, bronze medalist(s)

=== Trampoline ===
The United States qualified two male and female athletes in trampoline gymnastics.

Athlete	Event	Qualification		Final	
Athlete	Event	Score	Rank	Score	Rank
Jeffrey Gluckstein	Men's trampoline	46.500	7 Q	17.010	4
Steven Gluckstein	Men's trampoline	79.260	6 Q	12.035	6
Dakota Earnest	Women's trampoline	98.850	3 Q	51.060	2nd place, silver medalist(s)
Alaina Williams	Women's trampoline	92.885	5 Q	48.380	3rd place, bronze medalist(s)

== Handball ==
The United States has qualified a men's and women's handball team. The women's handball team qualified after defeating Canada in the Canada versus United States Series. The men's handball team qualified in a last chance qualifying tournament in Guatemala City after drawing with Uruguay and defeating Guatemala.

=== Men ===
The men's handball team will compete in Group B.

==== Team ====
The team that will be representing the United States in the men's tournament is as follows:

USA Men's National Handball Team roster
Players
Coaches

Pos.	#	Name	Age	Ht.	Weight	Club
G		Capparelli, Danny	37 – 24 September 1974	–	–	NYAC	(United States)
G		Thompson, David	31 – 15 March 1980	–	–	ATH United	(United States)
RB		Axelsson, Martin Clemons	30 – 21 October 1980	–	–	Lilestrom	(Sweden)
RW		Badr, Karim	29 – 20 February 1982	–	–	GSC	(Egypt)
RW		Chun, Carsen	24 – 21 June 1987	–	–	SG Nußloch / Air Force Academy	(Germany)
RB		El Zoghby, Adam	25 – 13 April 1986	–	–	Al-Ahly	(Egypt)
P		Fithian, Jordan	25 – 13 December 1985	–	–	TV Gelnhausen	(Germany)
LB		Hines, Gary	27 – 21 March 1984	–	–	HSC Bad Neustadt	(Germany)
LW		Key, Justin	24 – 6 March 1987	–	–	Army	(United States)
P		Kimmich, Danny	26 – 5 September 1985	–	–	TV Ramstein / Air Force Academy	(Germany)
CB		Lamour, Joe	28 – 7 August 1983	–	–	ATH United	(United States)
CB		Ortega, Mark (C)	33 – 25 July 1978	–	–	CDE Sinfin	(Spain)
LW		Self, Hans	24 – 13 September 1987	–	–	SG Bruchköbel	(Germany)
LB		Srsen, Domagoj	20 – 31 December 1990	–	–	RK Bjelovar	(Croatia)
CB		Williams, Michael	18 – 7 April 1993	–	–	SG Flensburg	(Germany)
G		Goodreau, Gabe (alt.)	-	–	–
G		Ignjatovic, Ivan (alt.)	-	–	–
CB		Acevedo, Guillermo (alt.)	-	–	–
RW		Mullin, Alex (alt.)	-	–	–

Head coach

- (United States) Darrick Heath

Assistant coach

- (United States) Wade Sutton

Team Leader

- (United States) Jim Thome

Legend

- Club denotes current club;
  nationality is of (first) club listed
- alt. denotes alternates
- Positions:
  - G: Goalkeeper
  - P: Pivot
  - CB: Centre Back
  - LW: Left Wing
  - RW: Right Wing
  - LB: Left Back
  - RB: Right Back

==== Preliminary round ====
Pos	Team	Pld	W	D	L	GF	GA	GD	Pts	Qualification
1	Argentina	3	3	0	0	95	55	+40	6	Semifinals
2	Dominican Republic	3	2	0	1	77	79	−2	4	Semifinals
3	Mexico (H)	3	1	0	2	78	93	−15	2	5th–8th place semifinals
4	United States	3	0	0	3	73	96	−23	0	5th–8th place semifinals

Source: Guadalajara 2011
Rules for classification: 1) points; 2) head-to-head points; 3) head-to-head goal difference; 4) head-to-head goals scored; 5) goal difference; 6) goals scored; 7) draw.
(H) Hosts

16 October; 18:00	Dominican Republic	27–22	United States	San Rafael Gymnasium; Referees: Pascal Martin, Luc Pellerin (CAN)
16 October; 18:00	2 players, 7	Report	Axelsson, 8	San Rafael Gymnasium; Referees: Pascal Martin, Luc Pellerin (CAN)

18 October; 15:00	United States	19–36	Argentina	San Rafael Gymnasium; Referees: Pascal Martin, Luc Pellerin (CAN)
18 October; 15:00	Hines, 6	Report	Pizarro, 8	San Rafael Gymnasium; Referees: Pascal Martin, Luc Pellerin (CAN)

20 October; 20:00	United States	32–33	Mexico	San Rafael Gymnasium; Referees: Carlos Maria Marina, Dario Leonel Minore (ARG)
20 October; 20:00	Hines 9	Report	Bermudez 9	San Rafael Gymnasium; Referees: Carlos Maria Marina, Dario Leonel Minore (ARG)

==== 5th-8th place semifinal ====
22 October; 12:30	Canada	26–25	United States	San Rafael Gymnasium; Referees: Enrique Perez (PUR), Jose Guzman (PUR)
22 October; 12:30	Walder 5	Report	El Zoghby 5	San Rafael Gymnasium; Referees: Enrique Perez (PUR), Jose Guzman (PUR)

==== 7th-8th place match ====
24 October; 10:00	United States	39–35	Venezuela	San Rafael Gymnasium; Referees: Clodoaldo Paz, Sergio Ricardo de Souza (BRA)
24 October; 10:00	El Zoghby 7	Report	Silva 9	San Rafael Gymnasium; Referees: Clodoaldo Paz, Sergio Ricardo de Souza (BRA)

Final rank: 7th

=== Women ===
The women's handball team will compete in Group B.

==== Team ====
The team that will be representing the United States in the women's tournament is as follows:

USA Women's National Handball Team roster
Players
Coaches

Pos.	#	Name	Age	Ht.	Weight	Club
G		Bandi, Jennifer	22 – 20 May 1989	–	–	Air Force Academy	(United States)
G		Fasold, Sophie	17 – 2 January 1994	–	–	Dynamo HC	(United States)
G		Messel, Jacque	-	–	–	Chicago Inter	(United States)
		Borg, Anja	17 – 10 October 1994	–	–	Vollen Ungdomslag	(Norway)
		Borg, Karoline (C)	21 – 15 September 1990	–	–	SK Njard	(Norway)
		Coulter, Anne	27 – 28 December 1983	–	–	Boston HC	(United States)
		Darling, Kathy	30 – 24 August 1981	–	–	Chicago Inter / AZS-AWF Warsawa	(United States)
		Haubrich, Jennifer	27 – 24 April 1984	–	–	FSV Mainz	(Germany)
		Gascon, Sarah	29 – 12 January 1982	–	–	Dynamo HC / AZS-AWF Warsawa	(United States)
		Lowey, Tabitha	26 – 29 October 1984	–	–	Chicago Inter	(United States)
		Hesser, Stephanie	17 – 22 November 1993	–	–	Dynamo HC	(United States)
		Sayer, Julia	24 – 27 May 1987	–	–	TSV Hahlen	(Germany)
		Stilwell, Gabriela	32 – 27 April 1979	–	–	Chicago Inter	(United States)
		Thorkelstdottir, Morgan	16 – 25 July 1995	–	–	Valur	(Iceland)
		Turner, Amber	17 – 24 February 1994	–	–	Dynamo HC	(United States)
		Hoddersen, Lynn (alt.)	-	–	–		(United States)
		Kizer, Erin (alt.)	-	–	–		(United States)
		Louthan, Kate (alt.)	-	–	–		(United States)
		Proctor, Taylor (alt.)	-	–	–		(United States)

Head coach

- (United States) Chris Cappelmann

Assistant coach

- (United States) Anca Stevens

Trainer

- (United States) Kim Moncel

Team Leader

- (United States) Dave Gascon

Legend

- Club denotes current club;
  nationality is of (first) club listed
- alt. denotes alternates
- Positions:
  - G: Goalkeeper
  - P: Pivot
  - CB: Centre Back
  - LW: Left Wing
  - RW: Right Wing
  - LB: Left Back
  - RB: Right Back

==== Preliminary round ====
Pos	Team	Pld	W	D	L	GF	GA	GD	Pts	Qualification
1	Brazil	3	3	0	0	125	43	+82	6	Semifinals
2	Dominican Republic	3	1	1	1	75	82	−7	3	Semifinals
3	Uruguay	3	1	1	1	75	91	−16	3	5th–8th place semifinals
4	United States	3	0	0	3	60	119	−59	0	5th–8th place semifinals

Source: Guadalajara 2011
Rules for classification: 1) points; 2) head-to-head points; 3) head-to-head goal difference; 4) head-to-head goals scored; 5) goal difference; 6) goals scored; 7) draw.

15 October; 13:00	Brazil	50–10	United States	San Rafael Gymnasium; Referees: Duran, Guzman (MEX)
15 October; 13:00	Da Silva 10	Report	Sayer 3	San Rafael Gymnasium; Referees: Duran, Guzman (MEX)

17 October; 13:00	United States	26–33	Dominican Republic	San Rafael Gymnasium; Referees: Pellerin, Martin (CAN)
17 October; 13:00	Borg 10	Report	Granado 10	San Rafael Gymnasium; Referees: Pellerin, Martin (CAN)

19 October; 18:00	United States	24–36	Uruguay	San Rafael Gymnasium; Referees: Perez, Guzman (PUR)
19 October; 18:00	Two players 5	Report	Castro 10	San Rafael Gymnasium; Referees: Perez, Guzman (PUR)

==== 5th-8th place semifinal ====
21 October; 10:00	Puerto Rico	29–27	United States	San Rafael Gymnasium; Referees: Gonzalez, Prieto (URU)
21 October; 10:00	Hiraldo 10	Report	Two players 5	San Rafael Gymnasium; Referees: Gonzalez, Prieto (URU)

==== 7th place match ====
23 October; 10:00	United States	23–30	Uruguay	San Rafael Gymnasium; Referees: Martin, Pellerin (CAN)
23 October; 10:00	Two players 5	Report	Palla 9	San Rafael Gymnasium; Referees: Martin, Pellerin (CAN)

Final rank: 8th

== Judo ==
The United States has qualified fourteen athletes, seven male and female athletes, to compete in all men's and women's judo competitions.

Men

Athlete	Event	Round of 16	Quarterfinals	Semifinals	Final
Athlete	Event	Opposition Result	Opposition Result	Opposition Result	Opposition Result
Aaron Kunihiro	-60 kg	Bye	Romero (ECU); W 110–001	Kitadai (BRA); L 000–100	Did not advance (to repechage round)
Kenny Hashimoto	-66 kg	Zuñiga (CHI); W 100–000	Verdugo (ECU); W 101–000	Valderrama (COL); W 010–001	da Cunha (BRA); L 000–121 (silver)
Michael Eldred	-73 kg	Castro (COL); W 110–000	Tritton (CAN); L 000–100	Did not advance (to repechage round)	
Harry St. Leger	-81 kg	Rodriguez (VEN); L 000–120	Did not advance (to repechage round)		
Jacob Larsen	-90 kg	Bye	Campos (ARG); W 100–010	González (CUB); L 000–121	Did not advance (to repechage round)
Kyle Vashkulat	-100 kg	Bye	Corrêa (BRA); L 010–110	Did not advance (to repechage round)	
Anthony Turner	+100 kg	da Silva (BRA); L 100–001	Did not advance (to repechage round)		

Repechage rounds

Athlete	Event	First repechage round	Repechage quarterfinals	Repechage semifinals	Bronze final
Athlete	Event	Opposition Result	Opposition Result	Opposition Result	Opposition Result
Aaron Kunihiro	-60 kg	Bye			Will (CAN); W 003–000 (bronze)
Michael Eldred	-73 kg	Bye		Salazar (CHI); W 001–000	Girones (CUB); L 000–001
Harry St. Leger	-81 kg	Aliva (MEX); L 000–001	Did not advance		
Jacob Larsen	-90 kg	Bye			Emond (CAN); L 000–100
Kyle Vashkulat	-100 kg	Bye	Santiago (PUR); L 000–100	Did not advance	
Anthony Turner	+100 kg	Bye		Baccino (ARG); W 102–000	Salazar (COL); W 010–000 (bronze)

Women

Athlete	Event	Round of 16	Quarterfinals	Semifinals	Final
Athlete	Event	Opposition Result	Opposition Result	Opposition Result	Opposition Result
Angela Woosley	-48 kg	Bye	Menezes (BRA); L 000–100	Did not advance (to repechage round)	
Angelica Delgado	-52 kg	Desravine (HAI); W 100–000	Sánchez (COL); W 001–000	Bermoy (CUB); L 000–100	Did not advance (to repechage round)
Hana Carmichael	-57 kg	Velazquez (VEN); W 001–000	Rodriguez (ARG); L 000–100	Did not advance (to repechage round)	
Christal Ransom	-63 kg	Bye	Acosta (MEX); L 000–001	Did not advance (to repechage round)	
Katie Sell	-70 kg	Bye	Cortés (CUB); L 000–100	Did not advance (to repechage round)	
Molly O'Rourke	-78 kg	Bye	Ortiz (CUB); L 000–100	Did not advance (to repechage round)	
Kayla Harrison	+78 kg	—N/a	da Silva (BRA); W 001–000	Castillo (CUB); W 002–001	Roberge (CAN); W 011–001 (gold)

Repechage rounds

Athlete	Event	First repechage round	Repechage semifinals	Repechage finals	Bronze final
Athlete	Event	Opposition Result	Opposition Result	Opposition Result	Opposition Result
Angela Woosley	-48 kg	Bye		Cobos (ECU); W 100–000	Carrillo (MEX); W 011–002 (bronze)
Angelica Delgado	-52 kg	Bye			Wiltshire (CAN); W 001-000 (bronze)
Hana Carmichael	-57 kg	Bye		Achurra (CHI); W 120-000	Amaris (COL); W 010-000 (bronze)
Christal Ransom	-63 kg	Bye		Garcia (PUR); W 100-001	Velasco (COL); W 002 H-002 (bronze)
Katie Sell	-70 kg	Bye		Leon (MEX); W 121–000	Mazzoleni (BRA); L 000–101
Molly O'Rourke	-78 kg	Bye		Kessler (ARG); W 101–000	Altheman (BRA); L 000–100

== Karate ==
The United States has qualified three athletes in the 60 kg, 67 kg, and 75 kg men's categories and three athletes in the 50 kg, 55 kg, and 68 kg women's categories.

Men

Athlete	Event	Round robin (pool A/B)			Semifinals	Final	
Athlete	Event	Match 1	Match 2	Match 3	Semifinals	Final	
Athlete	Event	Opposition Result	Opposition Result	Opposition Result	Opposition Result	Opposition Result	Rank
Adam Brozer	-60 kg	Perez (ESA); L 0–0 KIK	Soffia (CHI); L 3–7	Rendón (COL); L 0–5	Did not advance		
Brian Mertel	-67 kg	Novo (CUB); D 0–0	Ferreras (DOM); W 2–0	Viveros (ECU); D 1–1	Did not advance		
Tom Scott	-75 kg	Perez (ESA); W 1–0	Espinoza (ECU); W 1–0	Gustavo (DOM); D 0–0	Zamora (CUB); W 2–1	Gustavo (DOM); L 2–2	2nd place, silver medalist(s)

Women

Athlete	Event	Round robin (pool A/B)			Semifinals	Final	
Athlete	Event	Match 1	Match 2	Match 3	Semifinals	Final	
Athlete	Event	Opposition Result	Opposition Result	Opposition Result	Opposition Result	Opposition Result	Rank
Tyler Wolfe	-50 kg	Bruna (CHI); D 0–0	Candido (BRA); D 0–0	Ruiz (COL); D 1–1	Did not advance		
Shannon Nishi	-55 kg	Micheo (GUA); W 3–2	Reyes (CHI); D 0–0	Mendoza (MEX); W 2–0	Kumizaki (BRA); W 3–1	Diaz (DOM); W 1–1	1st place, gold medalist(s)
Cheryl Murphy	-68 kg	Guillen (VEN); W 1–0	Mateo (DOM); L 1–2	Lira (MEX); L 0–1	Did not advance		

== Modern pentathlon ==
The United States qualified two male and two female pentathletes.

Athlete	Event	Fencing (épée one touch)			Swimming (200 m freestyle)			Riding (show jumping)			Combined: shooting (10 m laser pistol), running (3000 m)				Total points	Final rank
Athlete	Event	Results	Rank	MP points	Time	Rank	MP points	Penalties	Rank	MP points	Shooting Rank	Time	Rank	Combined MP points	Total points	Final rank
Dennis Bowsher	Men's	12W 12L	12	820	2:03.84	1	1316	0	3	1200	4	11:12.01	4	2308	5644	4
Sam Sacksen	Men's	11W 13L	14	784	2:08.91	4	1256	80	17	1120	1	10:47.36	1	2408	5568	6
Margaux Isaksen	Women's	25W 7L	1	1084	2:19.23	3	1124	20	4	1180	1	12:38.39	1	1968	5356	1st place, gold medalist(s)
Suzanne Stettinius	Women's	16W 16L	9	832	2:27.23	10	1036	136	13	1064	3	13:06.81	3	1856	4788	7

== Racquetball ==
The United States qualified four male and four female racquetball players.

Men

Athlete	Event	Round robin			Round of 32	Round of 16	Quarterfinals	Semifinals	Final	
Athlete	Event	Match 1	Match 2	Match 3	Round of 32	Round of 16	Quarterfinals	Semifinals	Final	
Athlete	Event	Opposition Score	Opposition Score	Opposition Score	Opposition Score	Opposition Score	Opposition Score	Opposition Score	Opposition Score	Rank
Alex Ackerman	Singles	Rios (ECU); L 4–15, 12–15	Cruz (HON); W 15–3, 15–6	Mejia (MEX); L 11–15, 6–15	Banegas (HON); W 15–12, 15–5	Keller (BOL); L 7–15, 6–15	Did not advance			
Rocky Carson	Singles	Ugalde (ECU); W 15–5, 15–2	Camacho (CRC); W 15–8, 15–7	Monroy (BOL); W 15–12, 15–7	Bye	Herrera (COL); W 15–11, 15–6	Keller (BOL); W 15–11, 15–0	Beltran (MEX); W 15–12, 15–12	Mejia (MEX); W 15–1, 15–13	1st place, gold medalist(s)
Christopher Crowther; Shane Vanderson	Doubles	Monroy / Keller (BOL); W 15–7, 15–13	Camacho / Fumero (CRC); L 15–9, 12–15, 7–11	Gomez / Torres (COL); W 15–4, 15–9	—N/a	Bye	Maggi / Manzuri (ARG); W 15–9, 15–6	Beltrán / Moreno (MEX); L 15–9, 1–15, 4–11	Did not advance	3rd place, bronze medalist(s)
Alex Ackerman; Ro Carson III; Christopher Crowther; Shane Vanderson	Team	—N/a				Bye	Bolivia; W 2–0, 2–0	Ecuador; W 2–0, 2–0	Mexico; L 2–0, 0–2, 1–2	2nd place, silver medalist(s)

Women

Athlete	Event	Round robin			Round of 32	Round of 16	Quarterfinals	Semifinals	Final	
Athlete	Event	Match 1	Match 2	Match 3	Round of 32	Round of 16	Quarterfinals	Semifinals	Final	
Athlete	Event	Opposition Score	Opposition Score	Opposition Score	Opposition Score	Opposition Score	Opposition Score	Opposition Score	Opposition Score	Rank
Cheryl Gudinas	Singles	Gomar (GUA); W 15–3, 15–1	Garcia (DOM); W 15–11, 14–15, 11–2	Vargas (BOL); W 15–2, 15–13	Bye	Amaya (COL); W 15–12, 15–6	Grisar (CHI); W 13–15, 15–4, 11–1	Longoria (MEX); L 7–15, 10–15	Did not advance	3rd place, bronze medalist(s)
Rhonda Rajsich	Singles	Cordova (ECU); W 15–6, 15–3	Grisar (CHI); W walkover	—N/a	Bye	Tobon (VEN); W 15–6, 15–5	Muñoz (ECU); W 15–13, 15–6	Vargas (BOL); W 15–6, 15–7	Longoria (MEX); L 15–12, 10–15, 9–11	2nd place, silver medalist(s)
Rhonda Rajsich; Aimee Ruiz	Doubles	Paredes / Tobon (VEN); W 15–7, 15–7	Cordova / Muñoz (ECU); W 15–6, 15–3	—N/a		Bye	García / Portes (DOM); W 15–2, 15–6	Cordova / Muñoz (ECU); W 15–8, 15–5	Longoria / Salas (MEX); L 12–15, 15–5, 5–11	2nd place, silver medalist(s)
Cheryl Gudinas; Rhonda Rajsich; Aimee Ruiz	Team	—N/a				Bye	Dominican Republic; W 2–0, 2–0	Bolivia; W 2–0, 2–0	Mexico; L 1–2, 0–2	2nd place, silver medalist(s)

== Roller skating ==
The United States qualified three male and three female roller skaters.

Track skating

Athlete	Event	Qualification		Final	
Athlete	Event	Result	Rank	Result	Rank
Keith Carroll	Men's 300 m time trial	—N/a		26.322	7
Keith Carroll	Men's 1000 m	1:28.051	3 Q	1:26.612	5
Jake Powers	Men's 10,000 m	—N/a		eliminated	–
Sara Sayasane	Men's 300 m time trial	—N/a		27.734	5
Sara Sayasane	Women's 1000 m	1:38.943	3 Q	DNF	
Samantha Goetz	Women's 10,000 m	—N/a		DNF	

Free skating

Athlete	Event	Short program		Long program		Total score	Final rank
Athlete	Event	Score	Rank	Score	Rank	Total score	Final rank
John Burchfield	Men's free skating	118.80	4	122.40	4	486.00	4
Brittany Pricer	Women's free skating	114.70	7	109.10	9	442.00	8

== Rugby sevens ==
The United States qualified a team to participate in rugby sevens. It consisted of 12 athletes.

=== Team ===
- Mark Bokhoven
- Colin Hawley
- Rocco Mauer
- Folau Niua
- Milemote Pulu
- Nu'u Punimata
- Blaine Scully
- Roland Suniula
- Shalom Suniula
- Zachary Test
- Peter Tiberio
- Maka Unufe

=== Results ===
==== Preliminary round ====
All times are Central Standard Time (UTC−6)

Team	Pld	W	D	L	PF	PA	PD	Pts
Canada	3	3	0	0	109	28	+81	12
United States	3	1	1	1	54	55	−1	7
Brazil	3	1	1	1	33	71	−38	7
Chile	3	0	0	3	21	63	−42	3

October 29, 2011
11:00

United States	14 – 7	Chile
Tries: Unufe, Mauer; Con: Niua (2/2)	Report	Tries: Ianiszeswcki; Con: Herrera (1/1)

Tlaquepaque Stadium, Guadalajara

October 29, 2011
13:10

United States	19 – 19	Brazil
Tries: Unufe (2), Pulu; Con: Niua (2/3)	Report	Tries: Portugal, Cogliandro, Silva; Con: Duque (2/3)

Tlaquepaque Stadium, Guadalajara

October 29, 2011
15:15

United States	21 – 29	Canada
Tries: Bokhoven, Pulu, Niua; Con: Niua (3/3)	Report	Tries: Dala, Duke (2), Mack, Hearn; Con: Hirayama (2/5)

Tlaquepaque Stadium, Guadalajara

==== Quarterfinal ====
October 30, 2011
9:50

Guyana	12 – 24	United States
Tries:McKenzie, Gonsalves; Cons:Gonsalves (1/2)	Report	Tries:Scully, Niua (2), Mauer; Cons:Niua (2/4)

Tlaquepaque Stadium, Guadalajara

==== Semifinal ====
October 30, 2011
12:25

United States	19 – 21	Canada
Tries: Scully, Unufe, Suniula; Cons: Niua (2/3)	Report	Tries: Duke, Mack, Hearn; Cons: Hirayama (3/3)

Tlaquepaque Stadium, Guadalajara

==== Bronze medal match ====
October 30, 2011
14:30

Uruguay	17 – 19	United States
Tries: Ormaechea (2); Cons: Berchesi (1/2)	Report	Tries: Pulu, Punimata, Unufe; Cons: Niua (2/2)

Tlaquepaque Stadium, Guadalajara

2011 Pan American Games Bronze Medal

United States

== Rowing ==
The United States will send representatives to participate all fourteen events of the rowing competition. The finalized list of crews chosen to represent the United States was announced on September 27.

Men

Athlete(s)	Event	Heats		Repechage		Final	
Athlete(s)	Event	Time	Rank	Time	Rank	Time	Rank
Ken Jurkowski	Single sculls (M1×)	7:28.27	4 R	7:20.52	1 FA	7:20.55	6
Andrew Quinn; Dan Urevick-Ackelsberg	Double sculls (M2×)	6:45.59	1 FA	—N/a		6:39.40	4
Tom Paradisio; Bob Duff	Lightweight double sculls (LM2×)	6:45.14	2 R	6:44.44	1 FA	6:30.85	4
Andrew Quinn; Dan Urevick-Ackelsberg; Tom Paradisio; Bob Duff	Quadruple sculls (M4×)	6:31.46	5 FA	—N/a		6:10.88	6
Mike Gennaro; Ty Otto	Coxless pair (M2-)	6:45.85	1 FA	Bye		6:47.07	1st place, gold medalist(s)
Matt Wheeler; Joe Spencer; Steve Kasprzyk; Jason Read	Coxless four (M4-)	6:07.43	2 R	6:20.27	2 FA	6:07.85	5
Ryan Kirlin; Josh Gautreau; Frank Petrucci; Rob Milam	Lightweight coxless four (LM4-)	6:33.93	4 R	6:27.79	3 FB	6:18.62	(1) 7
Marcus McElhenney; Matt Wheeler; Joe Spencer; Steve Kasprzyk; Jason Read; Mike Gennaro; Ty Otto; Blaise Didier; Derek Johnson	Coxed eight (M8+)	6:02.21	1 FA	—N/a		5:39.32	1st place, gold medalist(s)

Women

Athlete(s)	Event	Heats		Repechage		Final	
Athlete(s)	Event	Time	Rank	Time	Rank	Time	Rank
Margot Shumway	Single sculls (W1×)	7:57.97	3 R	8:02.93	1 FA	7:53.05	1st place, gold medalist(s)
Jennifer Goldsack	Lightweight single sculls (LW1×)	8:25.32	2 R	8:02.48	1 FA	7:48.77	1st place, gold medalist(s)
Catherine Reddick; Megan Walsh	Double sculls (W2×)	7:24.97	2 R	7:23.52	1 FA	7:14.34	2nd place, silver medalist(s)
Chelsea Smith; Michelle Sescher	Lightweight double sculls (LW2×)	7:23.67	1 FA	—N/a		7:18.88	3rd place, bronze medalist(s)
Catherine Reddick; Megan Walsh; Chelsea Smith; Michelle Sescher	Quadruple sculls (W4×)	7:02.71	3 FA	—N/a		6:39.36	3rd place, bronze medalist(s)
Megan Smith; Monica George	Coxless pair (W2-)	7:31.72	1 FA	—N/a		7:29.05	2nd place, silver medalist(s)

== Sailing ==
The United States qualified nine boats and sixteen athletes to compete in all tournaments. The team was announced on April 18 by the US Sailing Olympic Selection Committee.

Men

Athlete	Event	Race											Net points	Final rank
Athlete	Event	1	2	3	4	5	6	7	8	9	10	M	Net points	Final rank
Bob Willis	Windsurfer (RS:X)	~~9~~	5	5	7	8	8	6	6	8	9	EL	61	7
Clay Johnson	Single-handed Dinghy (Laser)	8	5	1	5	6	~~8~~	5	7	2	5	EL	43	6

Women

Athlete	Event	Race											Net points	Final rank
Athlete	Event	1	2	3	4	5	6	7	8	9	10	M	Net points	Final rank
Farrah Hall	Windsurfer (RS:X)	3	2	5	2	3	2	3	5	4	~~DSQ~~	5	36	3rd place, bronze medalist(s)
Paige Railey	Single-handed Dinghy (Laser Radial)	5	1	~~11~~	3	9	1	1	1	3	1	5	35	3rd place, bronze medalist(s)

Open

Athlete	Event	Race											Net points	Final rank
Athlete	Event	1	2	3	4	5	6	7	8	9	10	M	Net points	Final rank
Greg Thomas; John Williams	Multihull (Hobie 16)	3	7	3	~~DNF~~	3	3	6	5	6	7	EL	43	6
John Mollicone; Geoffrey Becker; Daniel Rabin; George Paul Abdullah	Keelboat (J/24)	1	1	2	3	1	3	2	~~5~~	2	2	5	27	2nd place, silver medalist(s)
Jody Lutz; Jay Lutz; Derek Gauger	Multi-crewed Dinghy (Lightning)	1	3	1	~~6~~	4	2	4	2	2	3	5	32	2nd place, silver medalist(s)
Augie Diaz; Kathleen Tocke	Double-handed Dinghy (Snipe)	2	4	1	2	~~7~~	5	2	1	5	4	4	34	2nd place, silver medalist(s)
Paul Foerster	Single-handed Dinghy (Sunfish)	1	2	2	3	8	5	2	4	~~11~~	2	2	33	2nd place, silver medalist(s)

== Shooting ==
The United States will send 25 athletes to compete in the shooting competition. The team is as follows:

Men

Athlete	Event	Qualification		Final	
Athlete	Event	Score	Rank	Score	Rank
Will Brown	10 m air pistol	575	4 Q	672.4	5
Daryl Szarenski	10 m air pistol	583 PR	1 Q	681.7 PR	1st place, gold medalist(s)
Jonathan Hall	10 m air rifle	594	2 Q	696.6	2nd place, silver medalist(s)
Matt Rawlings	10 m air rifle	595 PR	1 Q	696.7 PR	1st place, gold medalist(s)
Emil Milev	25 m rapid fire pistol	578	1 Q	603 PR	1st place, gold medalist(s)
Nick Mowrer	50 m pistol	545	4 Q	634.4	6
Daryl Szarenski	50 m pistol	548	3 Q	640	2nd place, silver medalist(s)
Jason Parker	50 m rifle 3 positions	1155	1 Q	1249.1	1st place, gold medalist(s)
Matt Wallace	50 m rifle 3 positions	1150	3 Q	1247.0	2nd place, silver medalist(s)
Michale McPhail	50 m rifle prone	591	1 Q	693.2	1st place, gold medalist(s)
Jason Parker	50 m rifle prone	588	5 Q	690.8	3rd place, bronze medalist(s)
Glenn Eller	Double trap	147 PR	1 Q	195 PR	1st place, gold medalist(s)
Jeffrey Holguin	Double trap	DSQ		Did not advance	
Vincent Hancock	Skeet	122	1 Q	147 PR	1st place, gold medalist(s)
Frank Thompson	Skeet	118 +3	10	Did not advance	
Matt Gossett	Trap	121	3 Q	142	4
Jake Turner	Trap	118	8	Did not advance	

Women

Athlete	Event	Qualification		Final	
Athlete	Event	Score	Rank	Score	Rank
Teresa Meyer	10 m air pistol	371	9	Did not advance	
Sandra Uptagrafft	10 m air pistol	379	3 Q	476.3	3rd place, bronze medalist(s)
Emily Caruso	10 m air rifle	396 PR	1 Q	497.8 PR	1st place, gold medalist(s)
Meghann Morrill	10 m air rifle	391	5 Q	492.6	4
Teresa Meyer	25 m pistol	570	2 Q	765.6	5
Sandra Uptagrafft	25 m pistol	570	4 Q	769.8	2nd place, silver medalist(s)
Sarah Beard	50 m rifle 3 positions	571	2 Q	571	3rd place, bronze medalist(s)
Kim Rhode	Skeet	73 PR	1 Q	98 PR	1st place, gold medalist(s)
Kayle Browning	Trap	68 PR	1 Q	85	3rd place, bronze medalist(s)
Miranda Wilder	Trap	66	2 Q	87 PR	1st place, gold medalist(s)

== Softball ==
The United States has qualified a softball team.

=== Team ===
Following is the 2011 USA national softball team roster:

- Valerie Arioto
- Whitney Canion
- Kaitlin Cochran
- Lauren Gibson
- Kelly Grieve
- Taylor Hoagland
- Ashley Holcombe
- Molly Johnson
- Stacy Johnson
- Megan Langenfeld
- Jenae Leles
- Michelle Moultrie
- Christine Orgeron
- Keilani Ricketts
- Brittany Schutte
- Jordan Taylor
- Rhea Taylor
- Chelsea Thomas
- Jessica Shults (alternate)

=== Standings ===
Qualified for the semifinals
Eliminated

All times are Central Daylight Time (UTC−5)

Rank	Team	W	L	RS	RA
1	United States	7	0	54	6
2	Cuba	5	2	28	13
3	Venezuela	5	2	31	20
4	Canada	5	2	46	23
5	Dominican Republic	2	5	22	37
6	Mexico	2	5	18	37
7	Puerto Rico	2	5	27	42
8	Argentina	0	7	4	59

=== Results ===
Team	1	2	3	4	R	H	E
United States ◄	0	2	2	6	10	10	1
Venezuela	0	0	0	0	0	0	0
WP: Jordan Taylor (1–0) LP: Anyibell Ramirez (0–1) Sv: None; Home runs: USA: Amelia Leles (1); VEN: None http://200.57.183.69/ENG/SO/SOR173A_SOW40040010100021ENG.htm

Team	1	2	3	4	5	6	7	R	H	E
United States ◄	6	0	0	4				10	5	0
Dominican Republic	0	0	0	0	0	0	0	0	2	1
WP: Chelsea Thomas (1–0) LP: Dharianna Famlia (1–1) Sv: None; Home runs: USA: None; DOM: None http://200.57.183.69/ENG/SO/SOR173A_SOW40040010100006ENG.htm

Team	1	2	3	4	5	R	H	E
Mexico	0	0	0	0	0	0	1	3
United States ◄	4	1	1	0	1	7	8	0
WP: Kaitlin Cochran (1–0) LP: Adriana Bojorquez (0–1) Sv: None; Home runs: MEX: None; USA: None http://200.57.183.69/ENG/SO/SOR173A_SOW40040010100017ENG.htm

Team	1	2	3	4	5	6	7	R	H	E
Cuba	0	0	0	0	0	0	0	0	4	0
United States ◄	0	0	2	0	0	1	x	3	6	1
WP: Whitney Canion (1–0) LP: Marlen Bubaire (0–2) Sv: None; Home runs: CUB: None; USA: None http://200.57.183.69/ENG/SO/SOR173A_SOW40040010100026ENG.htm

Team	1	2	3	4	5	6	7	R	H	E
Puerto Rico	0	0	0	0	0	0	1	1	4	2
United States ◄	1	0	0	2	0	1	x	4	8	1
WP: Chelsea Thomas (2–0) LP: Kaylyn Camacho (1–1) Sv: None; Home runs: PUR: None; USA: None http://200.57.183.69/ENG/SO/SOR173A_SOW40040010100012ENG.htm

Team	1	2	3	4	5	R	H	E
United States ◄	0	5	3	1	3	12	13	0
Canada	5	0	0	0	0	5	8	0
WP: Whitney Canion (2–0) LP: Ashley Lanz (0–1); Home runs: USA: Stacy Johnson (4); CAN: Melanie Matthews (1) http://200.57.183.69/ENG/SO/SOR173A_SOW40040010100028ENG.htm

Team	1	2	3	4	5	6	R	H	E
Argentina	0	0	0	0	0	0	0	1	3
United States ◄	0	2	1	0	3	2	8	11	1
WP: Whitney Canion (3–0) LP: Virginia Sciuto Sv: None; Home runs: ARG: None; USA: Stacey Johnson (2), Christine Orgeron (1) http://200.57.183.69/ENG/SO/SOR173A_SOW40040010100024ENG.htm

==== Semifinal ====
Team	1	2	3	4	5	R	H	E
Cuba	0	0	1	0	0	1	1	0
United States ◄	0	4	1	1	7	13	15	2
WP: Keilani Ricketts LP: Anisley Lopez Sv: None; Home runs: CUB: None; USA: Christine Orgeron (2) http://200.57.183.69/ENG/SO/SOR173A_SOW40040030100001ENG.htm

==== Final ====
Team	1	2	3	4	R	H	E
Canada	0	1	0	0	1	3	2
United States ◄	1	2	4	4	11	12	0
WP: Jordan Taylor LP: Ashley Lanz Sv: None; Home runs: CAN: None; USA: Laruen Gibson (1) http://200.57.183.69/ENG/SO/SOR173A_SOW40040050100001ENG.htm

Final rank: (gold)

== Squash ==
The United States qualified three male and three female athletes to compete in the individual and team tournaments.

Men

Athlete	Event	Preliminary round		Round of 32	Round of 16	Quarterfinals	Semifinals	Final	
Athlete	Event	Match 1	Match 2	Round of 32	Round of 16	Quarterfinals	Semifinals	Final	
Athlete	Event	Opposition Score	Opposition Score	Opposition Score	Opposition Score	Opposition Score	Opposition Score	Opposition Score	Rank
Graham Bassett	Singles	—N/a		Weisskopf (ESA); W 7–11, 11–7, 11–2, 5–11, 11–3	Razik (CAN); L 5–11, 5–11, 5–11	Did not advance			
Christopher Gordon	Singles	—N/a		Bye	Binnie (JAM); W 11–7, 11–5, 11–5	Salazar (MEX); L 12–10, 4–11, 5–11, 10–12	Did not advance		
Christopher Gordon; Julian Illingworth	Doubles	—N/a			Bye	Weisskopf / Garcia (ESA); W 11–8, 11–9	Casarino / Caballero (PAR); W 11–8, 11–10	Salazar / Gálvez (MEX); L 7–11, 9–11	2nd place, silver medalist(s)
Graham Bassett; Christopher Gordon; Julian Illingworth	Team	El Salvador; W 3–1, 3–1, 3–0	Mexico; L 0–3, 0–3, 3–0	—N/a		Argentina; W 2–0, 3-3, 3-0	Canada; L 0–2, 0–1, 2-3	Did not advance	3rd place, bronze medalist(s)

Women

Athlete	Event	Preliminary round			Round of 32	Round of 16	Quarterfinals	Semifinals	Final	
Athlete	Event	Match 1	Match 2	Match 3	Round of 32	Round of 16	Quarterfinals	Semifinals	Final	
Athlete	Event	Opposition Score	Opposition Score	Opposition Score	Opposition Score	Opposition Score	Opposition Score	Opposition Score	Opposition Score	Rank
Olivia Blatchford	Singles	—N/a			Bye	Salazar (MEX); W 6–11, 11–8, 12–10, 6–11, 11–3	Cornett (CAN); L 7–11, 9–11, 11–8, 6–11	Did not advance		
Lily Lorentzen	Singles	—N/a			Bye	Serafini (BRA); L 9–11, 11–7, 4–11, 5–11	Did not advance			
Olivia Blatchford; Maria Ubina	Doubles	—N/a					Anckerman / Bonilla (GUA); W 10–11, 11–7, 11–7	Fernandez / Terán (MEX); L 4–11, 5–11	Did not advance	3rd place, bronze medalist(s)
Olivia Blatchford; Maria Ubina	Team	Brazil; W 0–3, 2–1, 3–0	Argentina; W 3–1, 3–0, 2–3	Mexico; W 3–2, 1–3, 3–0	—N/a			Colombia; L 3–0, 1–3, 0-3	Did not advance	3rd place, bronze medalist(s)

== Swimming ==
The United States has qualified athletes to participate in the various swimming competitions. The United States will send a team to Guadalajara based on performances at the 2011 ConocoPhillips USA Swimming National Championships in Palo Alto, California, serving as the official selection meet for the 2011 Pan American Games United States swimming team. The National Championships were held in early August and USA Swimming announced the representatives.

Men

Athlete	Event	Heats		Final	
Athlete	Event	Time	Position	Time	Position
William Copeland	50 m freestyle	22.75	2 Q	22.30	4
Bryan Lundquist	50 m freestyle	22.77	2 Q	22.67	6
Douglas Robison	100 m freestyle	49.09	1 Q	48.98	4
Robert Savulich	100 m freestyle	49.58	2 Q	49.62	6
Matthew Patton	200 m freestyle	1:50.09	1 Q	4:48.64	4
Douglas Robison	200 m freestyle	1:51.29	3 Q	1:48.71	5
Charlie Houchin	400 m freestyle	3:57.98	1 Q	3:50.95	1st place, gold medalist(s)
Matthew Patton	400 m freestyle	3:54.70	1 Q	3:51.25	2nd place, silver medalist(s)
Ryan Feeley	1500 m freestyle	15:32.86	1 Q	15:22.19	2nd place, silver medalist(s)
Arthur Frayler	1500 m freestyle	15:34.34	1 Q	15:19.59	1st place, gold medalist(s)
Eugene Godsoe	100 m backstroke	55.04	1 Q	54.61	2nd place, silver medalist(s)
David Russell	100 m backstroke	55.57	1 Q	54.87	4
Ryan Murphy	200 m backstroke	2:03.89	2 Q	1:58.50	3rd place, bronze medalist(s)
Rexford Tullius	200 m backstroke	2:03.82	1 Q	1:59.23	4
Kevin Swander	100 m breaststroke	1:01.38	1 Q	1:01.17	4
Marcus Titus	100 m breaststroke	1:01.28	2 Q	1:01.12	3rd place, bronze medalist(s)
Clark Burckle	200 m breaststroke	2:15.76	1 Q	2:12.60	2nd place, silver medalist(s)
Sean Mahoney	200 m breaststroke	2:14.20	1 Q	2:11.62 PR	1st place, gold medalist(s)
Christopher Brady	100 m butterfly	53.67	1 Q	52.95	3rd place, bronze medalist(s)
Eugene Godsoe	100 m butterfly	54.21	2 Q	52.67	2nd place, silver medalist(s)
Daniel Madwed	200 m butterfly	1:59.99	1 Q	1:58.52	2nd place, silver medalist(s)
Robert Margalis Jr.	200 m butterfly	2:04.64	4 Q	2:01.59	6
Conor Dwyer	200 m individual medley	2:04.56	1 Q	1:58.64	2nd place, silver medalist(s)
William Tyler Harris	200 m individual medley	2:07.74	4 Q	2:08.25	8
Conor Dwyer	400 m individual medley	4:24.98	1 Q	4:18.22	2nd place, silver medalist(s)
Robert Margalis Jr.	400 m individual medley	4:29.70	1 Q	4:24.88	3rd place, bronze medalist(s)
Christopher Brady; William Copeland; Douglas Robison; Robert Savulich; Connor Dwyer^{*} Eugene Godsoe^{*}	4 × 100 m freestyle relay	3:17.57	1 Q	3:15.62	2nd place, silver medalist(s)
Conor Dwyer; Charlie Houchin; Matthew Patton; Douglas Robison; Ryan Feeley^{*} Daniel Madwed^{*} Robert Margalis Jr.^{*} Rexford Tullius^{*}	4 × 200 m freestyle relay	7:27.09	1 Q	7:15.07	1st place, gold medalist(s)
Christopher Brady; Eugene Godsoe; Douglas Robison; Marcus Titus; David Russell^{*} Robert Savulich^{*} Kevin Swander^{*}	4 × 100 m medley relay	3:38.37	1 Q	3:37.17	2nd place, silver medalist(s)
Arthur Frayler	10 km marathon	—N/a		1:57:31.3	2nd place, silver medalist(s)

^{*}-Indicates athletes that participated in the preliminaries but not finals

Women

Athlete	Event	Heats		Final	
Athlete	Event	Time	Position	Time	Position
Lara Jackson	50 m freestyle	25.39	1 Q	25.09 PR	1st place, gold medalist(s)
Madison Kennedy	50 m freestyle	25.40	1 Q	25.24	3rd place, bronze medalist(s)
Erika Erndl	100 m freestyle	55.98	1 Q	55.04	2nd place, silver medalist(s)
Amanda Kendall	100 m freestyle	54.82	1 Q	54.75	1st place, gold medalist(s)
Catherine Breed	200 m freestyle	2:00.81	1 Q	2:00.08	1st place, gold medalist(s)
Chelsea Nauta	200 m freestyle	2:01.81	1 Q	2:00.62	2nd place, silver medalist(s)
Gillian Ryan	400 m freestyle	4:16.51	1 Q	4:11.58	1st place, gold medalist(s)
Ashley Steenvoorden	400 m freestyle	4:19.16	2 Q	4:20.51	8
Gillian Ryan	800 m freestyle	DNS		Did not advance	
Ashley Twichell	800 m freestyle	8:47.21	1 Q	8:38.38	2nd place, silver medalist(s)
Rachel Bootsma	100 m backstroke	1:01.75	1 Q	1:00.37 PR	1st place, gold medalist(s)
Elizabeth Pelton	100 m backstroke	1:01.57 PR	1 Q	1:01.12	2nd place, silver medalist(s)
Bonnie Brandon	200 m backstroke	2:13.87	1 Q	2:12.57	2nd place, silver medalist(s)
Elizabeth Pelton	200 m backstroke	2:10.66	1 Q	2:08.99 PR	1st place, gold medalist(s)
Ann Chandler	100 m breaststroke	1:09.57	2 Q	1:07.90	1st place, gold medalist(s)
Ashley Wanland	100 m breaststroke	1:09.26	1 Q	1:08.55	2nd place, silver medalist(s)
Michelle McKeehan	200 m breaststroke	2:32.68	2 Q	2:30.51	3rd place, bronze medalist(s)
Haley Spencer	200 m breaststroke	2:29.51	2 Q	2:29.30	2nd place, silver medalist(s)
Elaine Breeden	100 m butterfly	59.23	1 Q	59.81	3rd place, bronze medalist(s)
Claire Donahue	100 m butterfly	58.59 PR	1 Q	58.73	1st place, gold medalist(s)
Lyndsay DePaul	200 m butterfly	2:14.17	1 Q	2:12.34	2nd place, silver medalist(s)
Kim Vandenberg	200 m butterfly	2:12.04	1 Q	2:10.54	1st place, gold medalist(s)
Whitney Myers	200 m individual medley	2:20.62	2 Q	2:15.23	4
Julia Smit	200 m individual medley	2:15.52	1 Q	2:13.73	1st place, gold medalist(s)
Julia Smit	400 m individual medley	4:51.78	1 Q	4:46.15	1st place, gold medalist(s)
Allysa Vavra	400 m individual medley	4:53.76	1 Q	4:48.05	3rd place, bronze medalist(s)
Erika Erndl; Amanda Kendall; Madison Kennedy; Elizabeth Pelton	4 × 100 m freestyle	3:40.85 PR	1 Q	3:40.66 PR	1st place, gold medalist(s)
Catherine Breed; Amanda Kendall; Chelsea Nauta; Elizabeth Pelton; Erika Erndl^{*} Kim Vandenberg^{*}	4 × 200 m freestyle	8:05.64	1 Q	8:01.18 PR	1st place, gold medalist(s)
Rachel Bootsma; Ann Chandler; Claire Donahue; Amanda Kendall; Elaine Breeden^{*} Erika Erndl^{*} Elizabeth Pelton^{*} Ashley Wanland^{*}	4 × 100 m medley	4:04.52 PR	1 Q	4:01.00 PR	1st place, gold medalist(s)
Eva Fabian	10 km marathon	—N/a		2:05:54.8	4
Christine Jennings	10 km marathon	—N/a		2:05:52.2	3rd place, bronze medalist(s)

^{*}-Indicates athletes that participated in the preliminaries but not the finals.

== Synchronized swimming ==
The United States has qualified a team and a duet to participate in the synchronized swimming competition.

Athlete	Event	Technical routine		Free routine (final)			
Athlete	Event	Points	Rank	Points	Rank	Total points	Rank
Mary Killman; Maria Koroleva	Women's duet	90.125	2	89.338	2	179.463	2nd place, silver medalist(s)
Morgan Fuller; Megan Hansley; Mary Killman; Maria Koroleva; Michelle Moore; Leah Pinette; Lyssa Wallace; Katy Wiita; Alison Williams	Women's team	89.750	2	89.838	2	179.588	2nd place, silver medalist(s)

== Table tennis ==
The United States has qualified a men's and women's team of table tennis athletes, made of three athletes per team. The United States can qualify individual men's athletes through a special qualification tournament.

Men

Athlete	Event	Round robin			Eighthfinals	Quarterfinals	Semifinals	Final
Athlete	Event	Match 1	Match 2	Match 3	Eighthfinals	Quarterfinals	Semifinals	Final
Athlete	Event	Opposition Result	Opposition Result	Opposition Result	Opposition Result	Opposition Result	Opposition Result	Opposition Result
Mark Hazinski	Singles	Lin (DOM); L 2–11, 7–11, 7–11, 11–9, 7–11	Mejía (ESA); W 11–6, 11–2, 11–3, 11–2	Oxamendi (CUB); W 7–11, 11–4, 11–6, 3–11, 12–10, 11–4	St. Louis (TRI); L 4–11, 9–11, 7–11, 12–10, 6–11	Did not advance		
Yiyong Fan	Singles	Santos (DOM); W 11–8, 11–2, 11–5, 11–7	Pereira (CUB); L 12–10, 3–11, 11–13, 8–11, 12–10, 12–14	Okoh (MEX); W 11–9, 13–11, 11–13, 11–5, 11–7	Navas (VEN); L 2–11, 11–13, 8–11, 12–10, 11–8, 5–11	Did not advance		
Timothy Wang	Singles	Mino (ECU); L 11–13, 8–11, 8–11, 11–6, 10–12	Munoz (MEX); L 6–11, 8–11, 11–5, 9–11, 5–11	Peter (CAN); W 3–11, 7–11, 4–11, 12–10, 11–8, 11–4, 11–7	Did not advance			
Mark Hazinski; Yiyong Fan; Timothy Wang	Team	Argentina; L 0–3, 3–1, 3–2, 0–3, 2–3	Chile; W 3–1, 3–1, 3–2	—N/a	Brazil; L 0–3, 0–3, 1–3	Did not advance		

Women

Athlete	Event	Round robin			Eighthfinals	Quarterfinals	Semifinals	Final
Athlete	Event	Match 1	Match 2	Match 3	Eighthfinals	Quarterfinals	Semifinals	Final
Athlete	Event	Opposition Result	Opposition Result	Opposition Result	Opposition Result	Opposition Result	Opposition Result	Opposition Result
Ariel Hsing	Singles	Chung (TRI); W 10–12, 10–12, 11–6, 11–8, 11–1, 11–8	Ezzeddine (VEN); W 11–6, 11–5, 11–3, 11–4	Lopez (GUA); W 11–6, 11–6, 11–6, 11–4	Yamada (BRA); W 11–5, 7–11, 11–6, 3–11, 12–10, 7–11, 12–10	Silva (BRA); W 7–11, 9–11, 12–10, 6–11, 12–10, 13–11, 11–8	Wu (DOM); L 6–11, 6–11, 5–11, 11–5, 10–12	Did not advance (bronze)
Lily Zhang	Singles	Vargas (PER); W 9–11, 11–7, 11–7, 11–9, 11–4	Castillo (CUB); W 11–9, 11–8, 11–7, 11–5	Perez (ESA); W 11–5, 11–4, 11–3, 11–7	Luo (CAN); W 8–11, 11–7, 11–5, 11–6, 11–7	Ramos (VEN); W 11–6, 11–4,11–9, 11–8	Zhang (CAN); L 4–11, 11–4, 6–11, 7–11, 6–11	Did not advance (bronze)
Erica Wu	Singles	Madrid (MEX); L 11–9, 8–11, 11–7, 11–13, 9–11, 9–11	Wu (DOM); L 1–11, 5–11, 2–11, 11–9, 8–11	Jimenez (CUB); L 11–6, 5–11, 12–10, 6–11, 4–11, 11–8, 8–11	Did not advance			
Ariel Hsing; Lily Zhang; Erica Wu	Team	Peru; W 3–1, 3–1, 3–1	Dominican Republic; W 0–3, 3–0, 3–1, 0–3, 3–0	—N/a		Chile; W 3–0, 3–1, 1–3, 3–0	Venezuela; L 3–0, 0–3, 1–3, 3–1, 0–3	Did not advance (bronze)

== Taekwondo ==
The United States qualified eight athletes to compete in all taekwondo events.

Men

Athlete	Event	Round of 16	Quarterfinals	Semifinals	Final	
Athlete	Event	Opposition Result	Opposition Result	Opposition Result	Opposition Result	Rank
Olie Burton III	-58 kg	Mejia (GUA); L 11–15	Did not advance			
Terrence Jennings	-68 kg	Miranda (VEN); W 13–11	DaSilva (BRA); W 6–4	Bartermi (DOM); L 7–9	Did not advance	3rd place, bronze medalist(s)
T.J. Curry	-80 kg	Marcelino (BRA); W 8–5	Adriano (MEX); L 13–20	Did not advance		
Stephen Lambdin	+80 kg	Cañas (COL); W 4–0	Pérez (MEX); W 4–3	Diaz (VEN); L 3–7	Did not advance	3rd place, bronze medalist(s)

Women

Athlete	Event	Round of 16	Quarterfinals	Semifinals	Final	
Athlete	Event	Opposition Result	Opposition Result	Opposition Result	Opposition Result	Rank
Deireanne Morales	-49 kg	Zamora (GUA); W 6–5	Arakaki (BRA); W 10–3	Gonda (CAN); L 3–8	Did not advance	3rd place, bronze medalist(s)
Nicole Palma	-57 kg)	Contreras (DOM); W 8–7	Vasquez (ESA); W 9–4	Contrearas (MEX); L 7–9	Did not advance	3rd place, bronze medalist(s)
Paige McPherson	-67 kg	Bye	Dumar (COL); W 16–2	Castellanos (CUB); W 4–1	Pagnotta (CAN); L 6–7	2nd place, silver medalist(s)
Lauren Cahoon	+67 kg	Bye	Silva (BRA); W 1–1	Hernández (CUB); L 1–4	Did not advance	3rd place, bronze medalist(s)

== Tennis ==
The United States was represented by five tennis players, three male and two female.

Men

Athlete	Event	Round of 64	Round of 32	Round of 16	Quarterfinals	Semifinals	Final	
Athlete	Event	Opposition Score	Opposition Score	Opposition Score	Opposition Score	Opposition Score	Opposition Score	Rank
Nicholas Monroe	Singles	Bye	Massú (CHI); L 4–6, 4–6	Did not advance				
Greg Ouellette	Singles	Bye	Beretta (PER); W 0–6, 6–2, 6–4	Dutra da Silva (BRA); L 4–6, 5–7	Did not advance			
Denis Kudla	Singles	Bye	Galeano (PAR); W 6–1, 6–4	Farah (COL); L 4–6, 4–6	Did not advance			
Nicholas Monroe; Greg Ouelette	Doubles	—N/a		Echazú (Peru) Miranda (PER); W 6–3, 6–4	Arévalo (El Salvador) Arévalo (ESA); W walkover	Cabal (Colombia) Farah (COL); L 6–7^{(4–7)}, 6–7^{(7–9)}	Bronze final King (Barbados) Lewis (BAR); W 6–7^{(9–11)}, 6–2, [10–7]	3rd place, bronze medalist(s)

Women

Athlete	Event	Round of 32	Round of 16	Quarterfinals	Semifinals	Final	
Athlete	Event	Opposition Score	Opposition Score	Opposition Score	Opposition Score	Opposition Score	Rank
Christina McHale	Singles	Bye	Koch Benvenuto (CHI); W 6–4, 6–2	Cepede Royg (PAR); W 7–5, 6–3	Puig (PUR); L 6–7^{(2–7)}, 4–6	Bronze final Molinero (ARG); W 6–1, 6–1	3rd place, bronze medalist(s)
Irina Falconi	Singles	Gámiz (VEN); W 6–3, 6–3	Dabrowski (CAN); W 6–2, 6–0	Botto (PER); W 6–4, 6–0	Molinero (ARG); W 6–3, 6–4	Puig (PUR); W 6–3, 6–2	1st place, gold medalist(s)
Irina Falconi; Christina McHale	Doubles	—N/a	Bye	Kú Flores (Peru) Siles-Luna (PER); W 6–0, 6–0	Pereira (Brazil) Segnini (BRA); W 6–2, 2–6, [10–6]	Irigoyen (Argentina) Molinero (ARG); L 4–6, 6–2, [6–10]	2nd place, silver medalist(s)

== Triathlon ==
The United States qualified three male and three female triathletes.

Men

Athlete	Event	Swim (1.5 km)	Trans 1	Bike (40 km)	Trans 2	Run (10 km)	Total	Rank
Matt Chrabot	Individual	18:19	0:26	57:19	0:18	34:34	1:50:58	10
Mark Fretta	Individual	18:23	0:25	1:16:02	0:18	39:47	1:56:08	23
Manuel Huerta	Individual	18:24	0:26	57:12	0:16	31:50	1:48:09	2nd place, silver medalist(s)

Women

Athlete	Event	Swim (1.5 km)	Trans 1	Bike (40 km)	Trans 2	Run (10 km)	Total	Rank
Sarah Haskins	Individual	18:54	0:27	1:01:01	0:19	36:53	1:57:37	1st place, gold medalist(s)
Gwen Jorgensen	Individual	20:08	0:28	1:03:43	0:17	36:16	2:00:54	4
Sara McLarty	Individual	18:52	0:30	1:01:02	0:20	45:03	2:05:49	13

== Volleyball ==
The United States has qualified a men's and women's volleyball team.

=== Men ===
The men's team will compete in Group B.

==== Team ====
The men's indoor volleyball team is as follows:

- Outside hitters
  - Tony Ciarelli
  - Eric Vance
  - Tri Bourne
  - Matt Stork
  - Jordan DuFault
- Opposite hitters
  - Evan Patak
- Middle blockers
  - Nick Vogel
  - Matt Rawson
  - Cody Loe
- Setters
  - Kyle Cadwell
- Libero
  - Kirk Francis
- Coaches
  - John Speraw – Head Coach
  - Chris Jackson – Team Manager
  - Jeff Nygaard – Assistant Coach
  - Charlie Sullivan, Aimee Miyazawa – Trainers

==== Results summary ====
Preliminary		Quarterfinal	Semifinal	Final	Rank
Group B	Rank	Quarterfinal	Semifinal	Final	Rank
Puerto Rico; W 3–2	3	Argentina; L 2–3	Did not advance		
Canada; L 2–3	3	Argentina; L 2–3	Did not advance		
Brazil; L 1–3	3	Argentina; L 2–3	Did not advance		

Fifth-eighth classification	Classification final	Final rank
Venezuela; W 3–2	Canada; W 3–2	5

==== Preliminary round results ====
Pos	Team	Pld	W	L	Pts	SPW	SPL	SPR	SW	SL	SR	Qualification
1	Brazil	3	3	0	14	243	171	1.421	9	1	9.000	Semifinals
2	Puerto Rico	3	1	2	7	227	244	0.930	5	6	0.833	Quarterfinals
3	United States	3	1	2	6	313	324	0.966	6	8	0.750	Quarterfinals
4	Canada	3	1	2	3	238	282	0.844	3	8	0.375	

24 October 2011; 13:00	United States	3–2	Puerto Rico	Pan American Volleyball Complex; Attendance: 2,400; Referees: Marcelo Pierobon (ARG), Daniel Gonzalez (MEX)
24 October 2011; 13:00	(22–25, 25–19, 20–25, 25–16, 15–13); Report			Pan American Volleyball Complex; Attendance: 2,400; Referees: Marcelo Pierobon (ARG), Daniel Gonzalez (MEX)

25 October 2011; 18:00	United States	2–3	Canada	Pan American Volleyball Complex; Attendance: 3,500; Referees: Carlos Gimenez (VEN), Marcelo Pierobon (ARG)
25 October 2011; 18:00	(25–21, 23–25, 39–37, 33–35, 12–15); Report			Pan American Volleyball Complex; Attendance: 3,500; Referees: Carlos Gimenez (VEN), Marcelo Pierobon (ARG)

26 October 2011; 20:00	Brazil	3–1	United States	Pan American Volleyball Complex; Attendance: 3,011; Referees: Omelio Castillo (CUB), Carlos Gimenez (VEN)
26 October 2011; 20:00	(18–25, 25–17, 25–14, 25–18); Report			Pan American Volleyball Complex; Attendance: 3,011; Referees: Omelio Castillo (CUB), Carlos Gimenez (VEN)

==== Quarterfinals ====
27 October 2011; 18:00	Argentina	3–2	United States	Pan American Volleyball Complex; Attendance: 3,400; Referees: Yury Ramirez (DOM), Carlos Gimenez (VEN)
27 October 2011; 18:00	(25–17, 19–25, 25–18, 17–25, 15–11); Report			Pan American Volleyball Complex; Attendance: 3,400; Referees: Yury Ramirez (DOM), Carlos Gimenez (VEN)

==== Fifth-eighth classification ====
28 October 2011; 12:00	Venezuela	2–3	United States	Pan American Volleyball Complex; Attendance: 3,100; Referees: Daniel Gonzalez (MEX), Silvio Silveira (BRA)
28 October 2011; 12:00	(25–21, 17–25, 25–21, 18–25, 13–15); Report			Pan American Volleyball Complex; Attendance: 3,100; Referees: Daniel Gonzalez (MEX), Silvio Silveira (BRA)

==== Fifth place game ====
29 October 2011; 15:00	United States	3–2	Canada	Pan American Volleyball Complex; Referees: Daniel Gonzalez (MEX), Amaldo Piñero (PUR)
29 October 2011; 15:00	(22–25, 25–15, 25–19, 21–25, 19–17); Report			Pan American Volleyball Complex; Referees: Daniel Gonzalez (MEX), Amaldo Piñero (PUR)

Final rank: 5

=== Women ===
The women's team will compete in Group B.

==== Team ====
The women's indoor volleyball team is as follows:

- Outside hitters
  - Keao Burdine
  - Angela Forsett
  - Cynthia Barboza
  - Alexandra Klineman
- Opposite hitters
  - Regan Hood
  - Cassidy Lichtman
- Middle blockers
  - Lauren Gibbemeyer
  - Jessica Jones
- Setters
  - Carli Lloyd
  - Courtney Thompson
- Libero
  - Kayla Banwart
  - Tamari Miyashiro
- Coaches
  - Andy Banachowski – Head Coach
  - Mike Hebert, Jay Hosack – Assistant Coaches
  - Jenni Hirneisen – Technical Coordinator
  - Ken Sullivan – Team Leader

==== Results summary ====
Preliminary		Quarterfinals	Semifinals	Final	Rank
Group B	Rank	Quarterfinals	Semifinals	Final	Rank
Puerto Rico; W 3–0	1	Bye	Cuba; L 1–3	Bronze final Dominican Republic; W 3–1	3rd place, bronze medalist(s)
Peru; W 3–0	1	Bye	Cuba; L 1–3	Bronze final Dominican Republic; W 3–1	3rd place, bronze medalist(s)
Mexico; W 3–0	1	Bye	Cuba; L 1–3	Bronze final Dominican Republic; W 3–1	3rd place, bronze medalist(s)

==== Preliminary round results ====
Pos	Team	Pld	W	L	Pts	SPW	SPL	SPR	SW	SL	SR	Qualification
1	United States	3	3	0	15	231	161	1.435	9	0	MAX	Semifinals
2	Puerto Rico	3	2	1	8	245	231	1.061	6	5	1.200	Quarterfinals
3	Peru	3	1	2	5	225	262	0.859	4	7	0.571	Quarterfinals
4	Mexico	3	0	3	2	224	271	0.827	2	9	0.222	

15 October 2011; 13:00	United States	3–0	Puerto Rico	Pan American Volleyball Complex; Attendance: 3,600; Referees: Marcelo Siqueira (BRA), Andrew Cameron (CAN)
15 October 2011; 13:00	(25–17, 25–18, 25–14); Report			Pan American Volleyball Complex; Attendance: 3,600; Referees: Marcelo Siqueira (BRA), Andrew Cameron (CAN)

16 October 2011; 13:00	United States	3–0	Peru	Pan American Volleyball Complex; Attendance: 3,000; Referees: Andrew Cameron (CAN), Denny Cespedes (DOM)
16 October 2011; 13:00	(25–19, 25–15, 25–19); Report			Pan American Volleyball Complex; Attendance: 3,000; Referees: Andrew Cameron (CAN), Denny Cespedes (DOM)

17 October 2011; 19:00	United States	3–0	Mexico	Pan American Volleyball Complex; Attendance: 4,000; Referees: Marcelo Siqueira (BRA), Denny Cespedes (DOM)
17 October 2011; 19:00	(25–14, 25–16, 31–29); Report			Pan American Volleyball Complex; Attendance: 4,000; Referees: Marcelo Siqueira (BRA), Denny Cespedes (DOM)

==== Semifinals ====
19 October 2011; 15:00	United States	1–3	Cuba	Pan American Volleyball Complex; Attendance: 3,300; Referees: Brian Charles (TRI), Maria del Carmen Duran (MEX)
19 October 2011; 15:00	(17–25, 16–25, 27–25, 21–25); Report			Pan American Volleyball Complex; Attendance: 3,300; Referees: Brian Charles (TRI), Maria del Carmen Duran (MEX)

==== Bronze medal match ====
20 October 2011; 18:00	United States	3–1	Dominican Republic	Pan American Volleyball Complex; Attendance: 4,000; Referees: Brian Charles (TRI), Jose Velez (PUR)
20 October 2011; 18:00	(23–25, 25–16, 25–20, 25–19); Report			Pan American Volleyball Complex; Attendance: 4,000; Referees: Brian Charles (TRI), Jose Velez (PUR)

Final rank
(bronze) Bronze

== Water polo ==
The United States has qualified a men's and women's water polo team.

=== Men ===
==== Team ====
The men's water polo team is as follows:

Name	Pos.	Club
Merrill Moses	GK	The New York Athletic Club
Peter Varellas	A	Olympic Club Water Polo
Peter Hudnut	D	The New York Athletic Club
Ryan Bailey	C	Newport Water Polo Federation
Tony Azevedo	A	The New York Athletic Club
Jeff Powers	D/C	Newport Water Polo Federation
Layne Beaubien	D	The New York Athletic Club
Adam Wright	A	The New York Athletic Club
Tim Hutten	D	Newport Water Polo Federation
Jesse Smith	D	The New York Athletic Club
Brian Alexander	D	Olympic Club Water Polo
J. W. Krumpholz	C	The New York Athletic Club
Chay Lapin	GK	Shore Aquatics

==== Results ====
The men's team will be participating in Group B.

===== Preliminary round =====
All times are local Central Standard Time (UTC−6)

Qualified for the quarterfinals

Team	GP	W	D	L	GF	GA	GD	Pts
United States	3	3	0	0	37	15	+22	6
Brazil	3	2	0	1	34	26	+8	4
Argentina	3	1	0	2	23	30	-7	2
Venezuela	3	0	0	3	20	43	-23	0

October 23, 2011; 14:30	Report	United States	16–3	Venezuela	Scotiabank Aquatics Center, Guadalajara; Referees: Ricardo Callejas (MEX), Mikhail Dykman (CAN)
October 23, 2011; 14:30	Report	Score by quarters: 7–0, 5–2, 3–1, 1–0			Scotiabank Aquatics Center, Guadalajara; Referees: Ricardo Callejas (MEX), Mikhail Dykman (CAN)
October 23, 2011; 14:30	Report	Hutten 4	Goals	Three players 3	Scotiabank Aquatics Center, Guadalajara; Referees: Ricardo Callejas (MEX), Mikhail Dykman (CAN)

October 24, 2011; 14:30	Report	United States	8–5	Brazil	Scotiabank Aquatics Center, Guadalajara; Referees: Juan Menendez (CUB), Frank Bohm (AHO)
October 24, 2011; 14:30	Report	Score by quarters: 2–0, 2–2, 1–2, 3–1			Scotiabank Aquatics Center, Guadalajara; Referees: Juan Menendez (CUB), Frank Bohm (AHO)
October 24, 2011; 14:30	Report	Bailey, Hutten 3	Goals	Five players 1	Scotiabank Aquatics Center, Guadalajara; Referees: Juan Menendez (CUB), Frank Bohm (AHO)

October 25, 2011; 14:30	Report	United States	13–7	Argentina	Scotiabank Aquatics Center, Guadalajara; Referees: Del Valle (PUR), Madera (CUB)
October 25, 2011; 14:30	Report	Score by quarters: 3–2, 3–2, 4–2, 3–1			Scotiabank Aquatics Center, Guadalajara; Referees: Del Valle (PUR), Madera (CUB)
October 25, 2011; 14:30	Report	Powers 4	Goals	Two players 2	Scotiabank Aquatics Center, Guadalajara; Referees: Del Valle (PUR), Madera (CUB)

==== Semifinals ====
October 27, 2011; 15:30	Report	United States	12–2	Cuba	Scotiabank Aquatics Center, Guadalajara; Referees: Stampalija (CRO), Bohm (ANO)
October 27, 2011; 15:30	Report	Score by quarters: 4–0, 2–0, 2–2, 4–0			Scotiabank Aquatics Center, Guadalajara; Referees: Stampalija (CRO), Bohm (ANO)
October 27, 2011; 15:30	Report	Powers 3	Goals	Jimenez 2	Scotiabank Aquatics Center, Guadalajara; Referees: Stampalija (CRO), Bohm (ANO)

===== Gold medal match =====
October 29, 2011; 17:00	Report	United States	7–3	Canada	Scotiabank Aquatics Center, Guadalajara; Referees: Dragan Stampalija (CRO), Jose Werner (BRA)
October 29, 2011; 17:00	Report	Score by quarters: 2–1, 2–1, 1–0, 2–1			Scotiabank Aquatics Center, Guadalajara; Referees: Dragan Stampalija (CRO), Jose Werner (BRA)
October 29, 2011; 17:00	Report	Azevedo 3	Goals	Graham 2	Scotiabank Aquatics Center, Guadalajara; Referees: Dragan Stampalija (CRO), Jose Werner (BRA)

Final rank: (gold)

=== Women ===
==== Team ====
The women's water polo team is as follows:

Name	Pos.	Club
Elizabeth Armstrong	GK	The New York Athletic Club
Heather Petri	A	The New York Athletic Club
Melissa Seidemann	D	Stanford University
Brenda Villa	A	Olympic Club Water Polo
Lauren Wenger	AA	The New York Athletic Club
Margaret Steffens	D	Diablo Water Polo Club
Courtney Mathewson	A	The New York Athletic Club
Jessica Steffens	D	The New York Athletic Club
Elsie Windes	D	Tualatin Hills Water Polo Club
Kelly Rulon	A	The New York Athletic Club
Annika Dries	C	SET Water Polo Club
Kami Craig	C	Santa Barbara Water Polo Federation
Tumuaialii Anae	GK	SoCal Water Polo Club
Lolo Silver (alt.)	A	The New York Athletic Club

==== Results ====
The women's team will be participating in Group B.

===== Preliminary round =====
All times are local Central Standard Time (UTC−6)

Qualified for the quarterfinals

Team	GP	W	D	L	GF	GA	GD	Pts
United States	3	3	0	0	63	7	+56	6
Cuba	3	2	0	1	22	36	-12	4
Puerto Rico	3	1	0	2	28	43	-15	2
Argentina	3	0	0	3	11	38	-27	0

October 23, 2011; 8:30	Report	Argentina	0–20	United States	Scotiabank Aquatics Center, Guadalajara; Referees: Antonio Mejia (MEX), Andre Dester (BRA)
October 23, 2011; 8:30	Report	Score by quarters: 0–4, 0–6, 0–3, 0–7			Scotiabank Aquatics Center, Guadalajara; Referees: Antonio Mejia (MEX), Andre Dester (BRA)
October 23, 2011; 8:30	Report		Goals	Dries 4	Scotiabank Aquatics Center, Guadalajara; Referees: Antonio Mejia (MEX), Andre Dester (BRA)

October 24, 2011; 12:15	Report	Puerto Rico	4–24	United States	Scotiabank Aquatics Center, Guadalajara; Referees: Camilo Lopez (COL), Jose Werner (BRA)
October 24, 2011; 12:15	Report	Score by quarters: 0–8, 2–7, 1–7, 1–2			Scotiabank Aquatics Center, Guadalajara; Referees: Camilo Lopez (COL), Jose Werner (BRA)
October 24, 2011; 12:15	Report	García, Ralat 2	Goals	Craig 4	Scotiabank Aquatics Center, Guadalajara; Referees: Camilo Lopez (COL), Jose Werner (BRA)

October 25, 2011; 10:50	Report	United States	19–3	Cuba	Scotiabank Aquatics Center, Guadalajara; Referees: Lopez (COL), Paredes (VEN)
October 25, 2011; 10:50	Report	Score by quarters: 5–0, 4–1, 3–1, 7–1			Scotiabank Aquatics Center, Guadalajara; Referees: Lopez (COL), Paredes (VEN)
October 25, 2011; 10:50	Report	Seidemann 5	Goals	Three players 1	Scotiabank Aquatics Center, Guadalajara; Referees: Lopez (COL), Paredes (VEN)

===== Semifinals =====
October 26, 2011; 15:30	Report	Brazil	1–13	United States	Scotiabank Aquatics Center, Guadalajara; Referees: Hugo Parades (VEN), Dragan Stampalija (CRO)
October 26, 2011; 15:30	Report	Score by quarters: 0–3, 0–1, 0–3, 1–6			Scotiabank Aquatics Center, Guadalajara; Referees: Hugo Parades (VEN), Dragan Stampalija (CRO)
October 26, 2011; 15:30	Report	Canetti 1	Goals	Mathewson 5	Scotiabank Aquatics Center, Guadalajara; Referees: Hugo Parades (VEN), Dragan Stampalija (CRO)

===== Gold medal match =====
October 28, 2011; 17:00	Archived 2011-11-02 at the Wayback Machine	United States	27–26 (OT, PSO)	Canada	Scotiabank Aquatics Center, Guadalajara; Referees: Stampalija (CRO), Menendez (CUB)
October 28, 2011; 17:00	Archived 2011-11-02 at the Wayback Machine	Score by quarters: 1–1, 1–4, 2–2, 4–1 OT: 0–0 PSO: 19–18			Scotiabank Aquatics Center, Guadalajara; Referees: Stampalija (CRO), Menendez (CUB)
October 28, 2011; 17:00	Archived 2011-11-02 at the Wayback Machine	Mathewson 4	Goals	Csikos 5	Scotiabank Aquatics Center, Guadalajara; Referees: Stampalija (CRO), Menendez (CUB)

Final rank: (gold)

== Water skiing ==
The United States has qualified five male and female athletes to compete.

Athlete	Event	Preliminary/semifinal		Final	
Athlete	Event	Points	Rank	Points	Rank
Frederick Krueger IV	Men's jump	67.40	1 Q	64.90	1st place, gold medalist(s)
Jonathan Travers	Men's slalom	37.50	4 Q	44.00	1st place, gold medalist(s)
Russell Gay	Men's tricks	8560	3 Q	9040	4
Andrew Adkison	Men's wakeboard	54.45	1 Q	80.00	1st place, gold medalist(s)
Regina Jaquess	Women's jump	47.70	1 Q	50.60	1st place, gold medalist(s)
Regina Jaquess	Women's slalom	43.00	1 Q	39.00	1st place, gold medalist(s)
Regina Jaquess	Women's tricks	7060	2 Q	6090	3rd place, bronze medalist(s)
Regina Jaquess	Women's overall	—N/a		2955.7	1st place, gold medalist(s)

== Weightlifting ==
The United States has qualified six male and five female weightlifters.

Men

Athlete	Event	Snatch			Clean & jerk			Total	Rank
Athlete	Event	Attempt 1	Attempt 2	Attempt 3	Attempt 1	Attempt 2	Attempt 3	Total	Rank
Chad Vaughn	77 kg	142	145	147	174	179	~~190~~	326	3rd place, bronze medalist(s)
Kendrick Farris	85 kg	~~153~~	153	157	~~190~~	191	~~198~~	348	3rd place, bronze medalist(s)
Jared Fleming	94 kg	150	155	~~159~~	~~180~~	180	~~190~~	335	5
Jonathan North	94 kg	150	155	~~158~~	178	183	~~190~~	338	4
Donny Shankle	105 kg	157	162	165	195	203	~~206~~	368	3rd place, bronze medalist(s)
Patrick Mendes	+105 kg	170	175	~~178~~	205	~~210~~	~~213~~	380	8

Women

Athlete	Event	Snatch			Clean & jerk			Total	Rank
Athlete	Event	Attempt 1	Attempt 2	Attempt 3	Attempt 1	Attempt 2	Attempt 3	Total	Rank
Kelly Rexroad-Williams	48 kg	68	~~70~~	~~70~~	82	~~84~~	~~84~~	150	7
Hilary Katzenmeier	53 kg	75	~~78~~	~~78~~	93	97	100	175	5
Danica Rue	69 kg	~~86~~	86	88	107	112	115	203	5
Sarah Robles	+75 kg	104	109	112	~~135~~	~~135~~	~~135~~	DNF	
Chioma Amaechi	+75 kg	~~97~~	~~97~~	~~100~~	Did not advance			DNF	

== Wrestling ==
The United States has qualified a total of fifteen athletes to compete in wrestling. The United States qualified six male athletes to compete in the 55 kg, 66 kg, 74 kg, 84 kg, 96 kg, and 120 kg freestyle wrestling competitions, six male athletes to compete in the 60 kg, 66 kg, 74 kg, 84 kg, 96 kg, and 120 kg Greco-Roman wrestling competitions, and three female athletes to compete in the 48 kg, 55 kg, and 63 kg freestyle wrestling competitions based on performances at the Pan American Wrestling Championship.

Men

Athlete	Event	Round of 16	Quarterfinals	Semifinals	Finals / BM	
Athlete	Event	Opposition Result	Opposition Result	Opposition Result	Opposition Result	Rank
Obenson Blanc	Freestyle 55 kg	—N/a	Bye	Takahashi (CAN); W 3–0	Ramírez Beltré (DOM); L 1–3	2nd place, silver medalist(s)
Teyon Ware	Freestyle 66 kg	Bye	Lue (CAN); W 3–1	López (CUB); L 1–3	Bronze final Hurtado (COL); W 3–1	3rd place, bronze medalist(s)
Jordan Burroughs	Freestyle 74 kg	—N/a	Mercado (ECU); W 4–0ST	Roberty (VEN); W 3–1^{PP}	Blanco (CUB); W 3–1^{PP}	1st place, gold medalist(s)
Jake Herbert	Freestyle 84 kg	—N/a	Espinal (PUR); W 3–1	Diaz (VEN); W 3–1	Arencibia (CUB); W 3–1	1st place, gold medalist(s)
Jake Varner	Freestyle 96 kg	—N/a	Silva (MEX); W 3–0^{PO}	Pliev (CAN); W 4–0ST	Vivenes (VEN); W 3–0^{PO}	1st place, gold medalist(s)
Tervel Dlagnev	Freestyle 120 kg	—N/a	Delgado (ECU); W 4–0	Rodriguez (CUB); W 3–0	Dhinsa (CAN); W 3–0	1st place, gold medalist(s)
Joe Betterman	Greco-Roman 60 kg	—N/a	Lopez (MEX); W 3–1	Ramírez (DOM); W 3–0	Liendo (VEN); L 0–3	2nd place, silver medalist(s)
Glenn Garrison	Greco-Roman 66 kg	Bye	Duque (COL); W 3–1	Mulens (CUB); L 0–3	Bronze final Huacon (ECU); W 3–1	3rd place, bronze medalist(s)
Ben Provisor	Greco-Roman 74 kg	—N/a	Brown (PAN); W 3–0	Mercedes (DOM); W 3–0	Alvarez (CUB); L 1–3	2nd place, silver medalist(s)
Cheney Haight	Greco-Roman 84 kg	—N/a	Arias (DOM); L 1–3	Did not advance		
Pete Gounaridis	Greco-Roman 96 kg	—N/a	Lopez (MEX); W 3–0	Estrada (CUB); L 0–3	Bronze final Caraballo (VEN); L 0–3	
Tim Taylor	Greco-Roman 120 kg	—N/a	García (DOM); L 0–5	Did not advance		

Women

Athlete	Event	Round of 16	Quarterfinal	Semifinal	Final / BM	
Athlete	Event	Opposition Result	Opposition Result	Opposition Result	Opposition Result	Rank
Clarissa Chun	48 kg	Bye	Perez (MEX); W 3–0	Castillo (COL); W 3–1	Huynh (CAN); L 0–5	2nd place, silver medalist(s)
Helen Maroulis	55 kg	—N/a	Da Silva (BRA); W 5–0	Andrades (COL); W 3–0	Verbeek (CAN); W 3–1	1st place, gold medalist(s)
Elena Pirozhkova	63 kg	—N/a	Zavala (VEN); W 5–0	Roa (COL); W 3–1	Vidiaux (CUB); L 0–5	2nd place, silver medalist(s)
