= Field hockey at the 2015 Pan American Games – Women's team rosters =

This article shows the rosters of all participating teams at the women's field hockey tournament at the 2015 Pan American Games in Toronto. Rosters can have a maximum of 16 athletes.

== Argentina ==
The Argentine field hockey women's team that will compete at the 2015 Pan American Games:

- Belén Succi
- Macarena Rodríguez
- Jimena Cedrés
- Martina Cavallero
- Delfina Merino
- Agustina Habif
- Florencia Habif
- Rocío Sánchez Moccia
- Agustina Albertario
- Luciana Molina
- Pilar Romang
- Paula Ortiz
- Noel Barrionuevo
- Julia Gomes Fantasia
- Josefina Sruoga
- Florencia Mutio

== Canada ==
Canada announced their squad on June 25, 2015.

- Thea Culley
- Kate Gillis
- Hannah Haughn
- Danielle Hennig
- Karli Johansen
- Shanlee Johnston
- Sara McManus
- Stephanie Norlander
- Abigail Raye
- Maddie Secco
- Natalie Sourisseau
- Brienne Stairs
- Holly Stewart
- Alex Thicke
- Kaitlyn Williams
- Amanda Woodcroft

== Chile ==
The Chile field hockey women's team that will compete at the 2015 Pan American Games:

Head Coach: Ronald Stein

1. Claudia Schüler (GK)
2. Sofía Walbaum
4. Javiera Villagra
5. Francisca Pizarro
7. Sofía Filipek
8. Carolina García
9. Francisca Vidaurre
10. Manuela Urroz
13. Camila Caram (C)
14. Francisca Tala
15. Daniela Caram
16. Constanza Palma
17. María Bastías
18. Denise Krimerman
20. Agustina Venegas
21. Josefa Villalabeitia

== Cuba ==
The Cuba field hockey women's team that will compete at the 2015 Pan American Games:

- Yailyn Abrahan
- Mileysi Argentel
- Yusnaidy Betancourt
- Helec Carta
- Heidy González
- Roseli Harrys
- Ismary Hernández
- Tahimi Licea
- Yunia Milanés
- Sunaylis Nikle
- Yaniuska Paso
- Brizaida Ramos
- Annelis Reyna
- Marisbel Sierra
- Damnay Solis
- Yuraima Vera

== Dominican Republic ==
The Dominican Republic field hockey women's team that will compete at the 2015 Pan American Games:

- Agustina Birocho
- Yarinet de la Cruz
- Cindy de la Rosa
- Teresa de la Rosa
- Soledad del Pino
- María Disanti
- Yenny León
- Albania Marte
- Benifer Moronta
- Lucía Navamuel
- Cecilia Oflaherti
- Magalys Ortega
- Nayrobi Pichardo
- Daneiry Rivas
- Julieta Roncati
- Norma Sánchez

== Mexico ==
The Mexico field hockey women's team that will compete at the 2015 Pan American Games:

- Maribel Acosta
- Mireya Bianchi
- Ahide Castillo
- Cindy Correa
- María Correa
- Marlet Correa
- Eliana Cota
- Arlette Estrada
- María Hinojosa
- Montserrat Inguanzo
- Ana Juarez
- Michel Navarro
- Karen Orozco
- Fernanda Oviedo
- Jéssica Sánchez
- Jennifer Valdes

== United States ==
The United States field hockey women's team that will compete at the 2015 Pan American Games:

- Jaclyn Briggs
- Lauren Crandall
- Rachel Dawson
- Katelyn Falgowski
- Stefanie Fee
- Melissa González
- Michelle Kasold
- Kelsey Kolojejchick
- Alyssa Manley
- Kathleen O'Donnell
- Julia Reinprecht
- Katherine Reinprecht
- Paige Selenski
- Michelle Vittese
- Jill Witmer
- Emily Wold

== Uruguay ==
Uruguay announced their squad on July 7, 2015.

- Constanza Barrandeguy
- Cecilia Casarotti
- Mercedes Coates
- Kaisuami Dallorso
- Federika Kempner
- Matilde Kliche
- Lucía Laborde
- Lucía Lamberti
- Sofía Mora
- Agustina Nieto
- Florencia Norbis
- Anastasia Olave
- Rossana Paselle
- Janine Stanley
- Manuela Vilar del Valle
- Soledad Villar
