= Field hockey at the 2015 Pan American Games =

- Field hockey pictogram for the games
- Venue: Pan Am / Parapan Am Fields
- Date: July 13–25
- No. of events: 2 (1 men, 1 women)
- Competitors: 256 from 10 nations

Field hockey competitions at the 2015 Pan American Games in Toronto were held from 13 to 25 July 2015, at the Pan Am / Parapan Am Fields, which are located on the back campus of the University of Toronto. A total of eight men's and women's teams will compete in each respective tournament.

The winners of the two tournaments qualified for the 2016 Summer Olympics in Rio de Janeiro, granted they were not already qualified as a host or via the 2014–15 Hockey World League Semifinals.

== Competition schedule ==
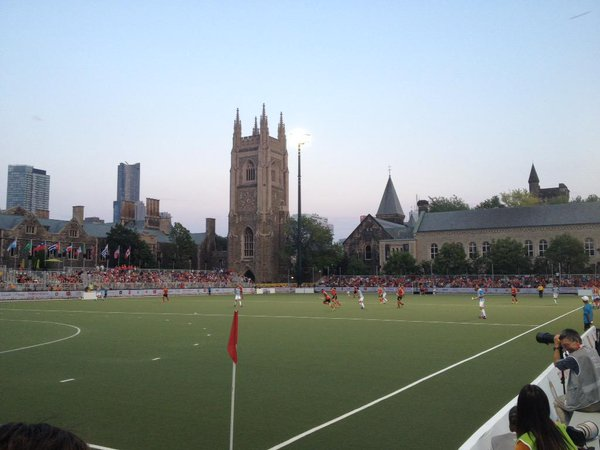
The Pan Am / Parapan Am Fields at the University of Toronto's back campus, was the venue for the field hockey competitions.

The following is the competition schedule for the field hockey competitions:

P	Preliminaries	¼	Quarterfinals	½	Semifinals	B	3rd place play-off	F	Final

Event↓/Date →	Mon 13	Tue 14	Wed 15	Thu 16	Fri 17	Sat 18	Mon 20	Tue 21	Wed 22	Thu 23	Fri 24		Sat 25	
Men		P		P		P		¼		½			B	F
Women	P		P		P		¼		½		B	F		

== Participating nations ==
A total of ten countries qualified field hockey teams.

- Argentina (32)
- Brazil (16)
- Canada (32)
- Chile (32)
- Cuba (32)
- Dominican Republic (16)
- Mexico (32)
- Trinidad and Tobago (16)
- United States (32)
- Uruguay (16)

== Qualification ==
A total of eight men's teams and eight women's teams will qualify to compete at the games. The top two teams at the South American and Central American and Caribbean Games will qualify for each respective tournament. The host nation (Canada) automatically qualifies teams in both events. The remaining three spots in each tournament will be given to the three best teams from the respective 2013 Pan American Cup that have yet to qualify. This will happen after the two qualification tournaments in 2014 are played. Each nation may enter one team in each tournament (16 athletes per team) for a maximum total of 32 athletes.

=== Men ===
Event	Date	Location	Quotas	Qualifier(s)
Host	—N/a	—N/a	1	Canada
2013 Pan American Cup	10–17 August 2013	(Canada) Brampton	3	United States; Mexico; Brazil
2014 South American Games	8–16 March 2014	(Chile) Santiago	2	Argentina; Chile
2014 Central American and Caribbean Games	16–24 November 2014	(Mexico) Veracruz	2	Cuba; Trinidad and Tobago
Total			8	

=== Women ===
Event	Date	Location	Quotas	Qualifier(s)
Host	—N/a	—N/a	1	Canada
2013 Pan American Cup	21–28 September 2013	(Argentina) Mendoza	3	United States; Mexico; Uruguay
2014 South American Games	9–16 March 2014	(Chile) Santiago	2	Argentina; Chile
2014 Central American and Caribbean Games	15–23 November 2014	(Mexico) Veracruz	2	Cuba; Dominican Republic
Total			8	

== Medal summary ==
=== Medal table ===
* Host nation (Canada)

Rank	Nation	Gold	Silver	Bronze	Total
1	Argentina	1	1	0	2
2	United States	1	0	0	1
3	Canada*	0	1	1	2
4	Chile	0	0	1	1
Totals (4 entries)		2	2	2	6

=== Medalists ===
Event	Gold	Silver	Bronze
Men's tournament	Argentina; Juan Manuel Vivaldi; Gonzalo Peillat; Juan Gilardi; Pedro Ibarra; Facundo Callioni; Matías Paredes; Joaquin Menini; Lucas Vila; Ignacio Ortiz; Juan Martín López; Nicolas Della Torre; Isidoro Ibarra; Matias Rey; Manuel Brunet; Agustin Mazzili; Lucas Rossi	Canada; Brenden Bissett; David Carter; Taylor Curran; Adam Froese; Matthew Guest; Gabriel Ho-Garcia; David Jameson; Gordon Johnston; Ben Martin; Devohn Noronha-Teixeira; Sukhi Panesar; Mark Pearson; Matthew Sarmento; Iain Smythe; Scott Tupper; Paul Wharton	Chile; Richardo Achondo; Prada A. Berczely; Fernando Binder Wiener; Felipe Eggers; Andres Fuenzalida; Ignacio Gajardo; Adrian Henriquez; Thomas Kannegiesser; Seba Kapsch; Vicente Martin Tarud; Fernando Renz; Nicolas Renz; Sven Richter; Martin Rodriguez Ducaud; Raimundo Valenzuela; Jaime Zarhi
Women's tournament	United States; Jaclyn Briggs; Lauren Crandall; Rachel Dawson; Katelyn Falgowski; Stefanie Fee; Melissa Gonzalez; Michelle Kasold; Kelsey Kolojejchick; Alyssa Manley; Kathleen O'Donnell; Julia Reinprecht; Katherine Reinprecht; Paige Selenski; Michelle Vittese; Jill Witmer; Emily Wold	Argentina; Belén Succi; Macarena Rodríguez; Jimena Cedrés; Martina Cavallero; Delfina Merino; Agustina Habif; Florencia Habif; Rocío Sánchez Moccia; Agustina Albertario; Luciana Molina; Pilar Romang; Paula Ortiz; Noel Barrionuevo; Julia Gomes Fantasia; Josefina Sruoga; Florencia Mutio	Canada; Thea Culley; Kate Gillis; Hannah Haughn; Danielle Hennig; Karli Johansen; Shanlee Johnston; Sara McManus; Stephanie Norlander; Abigail Raye; Madeline Secco; Natalie Sourisseau; Brienne Stairs; Holly Stewart; Alex Thicke; Kaitlyn Williams; Amanda Woodcroft

== Men's tournament ==
=== Preliminary round ===
==== Pool A ====
Pos	Team	Pld	W	D	L	GF	GA	GD	Pts	Qualification
1	Argentina	3	3	0	0	22	4	+18	9	Quarter-finals
2	United States	3	1	1	1	5	10	−5	4	Quarter-finals
3	Cuba	3	0	2	1	9	10	−1	2	Quarter-finals
4	Trinidad and Tobago	3	0	1	2	3	15	−12	1	Quarter-finals

Source: FIH
Rules for classification: 1) points; 2) matches won; 3) goal difference; 4) goals for; 5) head-to-head result.

==== Pool B ====
Pos	Team	Pld	W	D	L	GF	GA	GD	Pts	Qualification
1	Canada (H)	3	3	0	0	18	2	+16	9	Quarter-finals
2	Chile	3	2	0	1	6	4	+2	6	Quarter-finals
3	Brazil	3	1	0	2	3	12	−9	3	Quarter-finals
4	Mexico	3	0	0	3	3	12	−9	0	Quarter-finals

Source: FIH
Rules for classification: 1) points; 2) matches won; 3) goal difference; 4) goals for; 5) head-to-head result.
(H) Hosts

=== Medal round ===
Quarter-finals
21 July
Argentina	12
Mexico	0
21 July
Chile	6
Cuba	2
21 July
United States	1 (1)
Brazil (s.o.)	1 (3)
21 July
Canada	3
Trinidad and Tobago	0

Semi-finals
23 July
Argentina	6
Chile	0
23 July
Brazil	0 (3)
Canada (s.o.)	0 (5)

Gold medal match
25 July
Argentina	3
Canada	0
Bronze medal match
25 July
Chile	4
Brazil	1

== Women's tournament ==
=== Preliminary round ===
==== Pool A ====
Pos	Team	Pld	W	D	L	GF	GA	GD	Pts	Qualification
1	Argentina	3	3	0	0	26	0	+26	9	Quarterfinals
2	Canada	3	2	0	1	16	6	+10	6	Quarterfinals
3	Mexico	3	0	1	2	1	14	−13	1	Quarterfinals
4	Dominican Republic	3	0	1	2	2	25	−23	1	Quarterfinals

Source: FIH
Rules for classification: 1) points; 2) goal difference; 3) goals scored; 4) head-to-head result.

==== Pool B ====
Pos	Team	Pld	W	D	L	GF	GA	GD	Pts	Qualification
1	United States	3	3	0	0	19	0	+19	9	Quarterfinals
2	Chile	3	2	0	1	10	4	+6	6	Quarterfinals
3	Uruguay	3	1	0	2	3	10	−7	3	Quarterfinals
4	Cuba	3	0	0	3	4	22	−18	0	Quarterfinals

Source: FIH
Rules for classification: 1) points; 2) goal difference; 3) goals scored; 4) head-to-head result.

=== Medal round ===
Quarter-finals
20 July
Argentina	10
Cuba	0
20 July
Chile	7
Mexico	0
20 July
Canada	2
Uruguay	0
20 July
United States	15
Dominican Republic	0

Semi-finals
22 July
Argentina	5
Chile	0
22 July
Canada	0
United States	3

Gold-medal match
24 July
Argentina	1
United States	2
Bronze-medal match
24 July
Chile	0
Canada	1
