= Field hockey at the 2015 Pan American Games – Women's tournament =

Women's field hockey at the 2015 Pan American Games
Tournament details
- Host country: Canada
- City: Toronto
- Dates: July 13–24
- Teams: 8
- Venue: Pan Am / Parapan Am Fields

Final positions
- Champions: United States (2nd title)
- Runner-up: Argentina
- Third place: Canada

Tournament statistics
- Matches played: 24
- Goals scored: 141 (5.88 per match)
- Top scorer: (Argentina) Noel Barrionuevo (9 goals)

The women's field hockey tournament at the 2015 Pan American Games was held in Toronto, Canada at the Pan Am / Parapan Am Fields from July 13 to 24.

For these Games, the women competed in an 8-team tournament. The teams were grouped into two pools of four teams each for a round-robin preliminary round. All teams will advance to an eight team single elimination bracket.

The United States are the defending champions from the 2011 Pan American Games in Guadalajara, defeating Argentina, 4–2 in the final.

The winner of this tournament will qualify for the 2016 Summer Olympics in Rio de Janeiro.

== Qualification ==
A total of eight women's teams qualified to compete at the games. The top two teams at the South American and Central American and Caribbean Games qualified for the tournament. The host nation (Canada) automatically qualified as well. The remaining three spots were e given to the three best teams from the 2013 Pan American Cup that had not qualified yet. This happened after the two qualification tournaments in 2014 were played. Each nation may enter one team (16 athletes per team).

=== Summary ===
Event	Date	Location	Quotas	Qualifier(s)
Host	—N/a	—N/a	1	Canada
2013 Pan American Cup	21–28 September 2013	(Argentina) Mendoza	3	United States; Mexico; Uruguay
2014 South American Games	9–16 March 2014	(Chile) Santiago	2	Argentina; Chile
2014 Central American and Caribbean Games	15–23 November 2014	(Mexico) Veracruz	2	Cuba; Dominican Republic
Total			8	

== Pools ==
Pools were based on the world rankings as of January 21, 2015. Teams were placed into pools using the serpentine system. Teams ranked 1, 4, 5 and 8 would be in Pool A, while teams ranked 2, 3, 6 and 7 would be in Pool B.

Rankings are listed in parentheses.

Pool A	Pool B
Argentina (3); Canada (22); Mexico (28); Dominican Republic (52)	United States (8); Chile (20); Uruguay (30); Cuba (44)

== Rosters ==
At the start of tournament, all eight participating countries had up to 16 players on their rosters.

- Argentina
- Canada
- Chile
- Cuba
- Dominican Republic
- Mexico
- United States
- Uruguay

== Competition format ==
In the first round of the competition, teams were divided into two pools of four teams, and play followed round robin format with each of the teams playing all other teams in the pool once. Teams were awarded three points for a win, one point for a draw and zero points for a loss.

Following the completion of the pool games, all eight teams advanced to a single elimination round consisting of four quarterfinal games, two semifinal games, and the bronze and gold-medal matches. Losing teams competed in classification matches to determine their ranking in the tournament. A penalty stroke competition took place, if a classification match ended in a draw, to determine a winner.

All games were played in four 15 minute quarters.

== Medalists ==
Event	Gold	Silver	Bronze
Women's tournament	United States; Jaclyn Briggs; Lauren Crandall; Rachel Dawson; Katelyn Falgowski; Stefanie Fee; Melissa Gonzalez; Michelle Kasold; Kelsey Kolojejchick; Alyssa Manley; Kathleen O'Donnell; Julia Reinprecht; Katherine Reinprecht; Paige Selenski; Michelle Vittese; Jill Witmer; Emily Wold	Argentina; Belén Succi; Macarena Rodríguez; Jimena Cedrés; Martina Cavallero; Delfina Merino; Agustina Habif; Florencia Habif; Rocío Sánchez Moccia; Agustina Albertario; Luciana Molina; Pilar Romang; Paula Ortiz; Noel Barrionuevo; Julia Gomes Fantasia; Josefina Sruoga; Florencia Mutio	Canada; Thea Culley; Kate Gillis; Hannah Haughn; Danielle Hennig; Karli Johansen; Shanlee Johnston; Sara McManus; Stephanie Norlander; Abigail Raye; Madeline Secco; Natalie Sourisseau; Brienne Stairs; Holly Stewart; Alex Thicke; Kaitlyn Williams; Amanda Woodcroft

== Results ==
The official schedule was revealed on February 18, 2015.

All times are Eastern Daylight Time (UTC−4)

=== Preliminary round ===
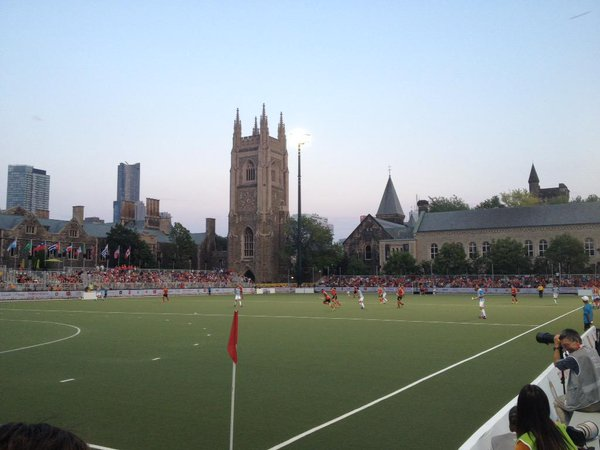
The Pan Am / Parapan Am Fields at the University of Toronto's back campus, was the venue for the women's field hockey tournament

==== Pool A ====
Pos	Team	Pld	W	D	L	GF	GA	GD	Pts	Qualification
1	Argentina	3	3	0	0	26	0	+26	9	Quarterfinals
2	Canada	3	2	0	1	16	6	+10	6	Quarterfinals
3	Mexico	3	0	1	2	1	14	−13	1	Quarterfinals
4	Dominican Republic	3	0	1	2	2	25	−23	1	Quarterfinals

Source: FIH
Rules for classification: 1) points; 2) goal difference; 3) goals scored; 4) head-to-head result.

13 July 2015
17:00

Argentina	9–0	Mexico
Merino 7', 22'; Ortiz 10'; Barrionuevo 21', 35'; Albertarrio 24', 26'; Habif 36'; Rodríguez 58'	Report

Umpires:
Suzi Sutton (USA)
Aleesha Unka (NZL)

13 July 2015
19:00

Canada	12–1	Dominican Republic
Norlander 10', 18', 51'; Gillis 11', 26', 40'; Johansen 14', 43'; Secco 22'; Hennig 38', 55'; Culley 53'	Report	Moronta Perez 26'

Umpires:
Michelle Joubert (RSA)
Nur Hafizah Azman (MAS)

15 July 2015
17:00

Mexico	1–1	Dominican Republic
Sánchez 35'	Report	Oflaherti Paganini 26'

Umpires:
Meghan McLennan (CAN)
Soledad Iparraguirre (ARG)

15 July 2015
19:00

Canada	0–5	Argentina
	Report	Barrionuevo 8'; Gomes Fantasia 24'; F. Habif 29'; Albertarrio 38'; Merino 51'

Umpires:
Aleesha Unka (NZL)
Ayanna McClean (TTO)

17 July 2015
17:00

Argentina	12–0	Dominican Republic
Barrionuevo 4', 12'; Albertarrio 15'; Romang 18', 29'; Sánchez Moccia 19', 48'; Rodríguez 24'; Merino 27'; Ortiz 31'; Gomes Fantasia 32'; Molina 59'	Report

Umpires:
Camila Cabargas (CHI)
Stephanie Judefind (USA)

17 July 2015
19:00

Mexico	0–4	Canada
	Report	Johansen 17'; Culley 26'; Haughn 30', 56'

Umpires:
Verónica Villafañe (ARG)
Nur Hafizah Azman (MAS)

==== Pool B ====
Pos	Team	Pld	W	D	L	GF	GA	GD	Pts	Qualification
1	United States	3	3	0	0	19	0	+19	9	Quarterfinals
2	Chile	3	2	0	1	10	4	+6	6	Quarterfinals
3	Uruguay	3	1	0	2	3	10	−7	3	Quarterfinals
4	Cuba	3	0	0	3	4	22	−18	0	Quarterfinals

Source: FIH
Rules for classification: 1) points; 2) goal difference; 3) goals scored; 4) head-to-head result.

13 July 2015
09:00

Chile	7–2	Cuba
D. Caram 6', 16'; Villagra 27'; García 44'; Pizarro 47'; Filipek 47'; C. Caram 58'	Report	Sierra 24', 27'

Umpires:
Megan Robertson (CAN)
Stephanie Judefind (USA)

13 July 2015
11:00

United States	5–0	Uruguay
K. Reinprecht 2'; Kasold 18'; Vittese 28'; Falgowski 36'; Kolojejchick 56'	Report

Umpires:
Soledad Iparraguirre (ARG)
Camila Cabargas (CHI)

15 July 2015
09:00

Chile	0–2	United States
	Report	Witmer 7'; Selenski 13'

Umpires:
Verónica Villafañe (ARG)
Michelle Joubert (RSA)

15 July 2015
11:00

Uruguay	3–2	Cuba
Barrandeguy 10'; Vilar del Valle 29'; Olave Solari 47'	Report	Vera 22'; Paso 32'

Umpires:
Stephanie Judefind (USA)
Suzi Sutton (USA)

17 July 2015
09:00

United States	12–0	Cuba
O'Donnell 2', 25'; Selenski 15'; González 17', 50'; Dawson 21'; Witmer 27', 54'; Vittese 35'; K. Reinprecht 36'; Falgowski 47'; Kasold 48'	Report

Umpires:
Meghan McLennan (CAN)
Ayanna McClean (TTO)

17 July 2015
11:00

Uruguay	0–3	Chile
	Report	García 6'; Urroz 7'; C. Caram 49'

Umpires:
Megan Robertson (CAN)
Soledad Iparraguirre (ARG)

=== Classification round ===
Quarter-finals
20 July
Argentina	10
Cuba	0
20 July
Chile	7
Mexico	0
20 July
Canada	2
Uruguay	0
20 July
United States	15
Dominican Republic	0

Semi-finals
22 July
Argentina	5
Chile	0
22 July
Canada	0
United States	3

Gold-medal match
24 July
Argentina	1
United States	2
Bronze-medal match
24 July
Chile	0
Canada	1

==== Quarter-finals ====
20 July 2015
09:00

Argentina	10–0	Cuba
Sánchez Moccia 5', 52'; Barrionuevo 15', 17', 22', 43', 51'; Romang 20'; F. Habif 24'; Molina 25'	Report

Umpires:
Suzi Sutton (USA)
Meghan McLennan (CAN)

20 July 2015
11:30

Chile	7–0	Mexico
García 1'; Villagra 11'; Urroz 24', 34', 44'; Vidaurre 37'; Venegas 40'	Report

Umpires:
Aleesha Unka (NZL)
Ayanna McClean (TTO)

20 July 2015
17:00

United States	15–0	Dominican Republic
Selenski 9'; Kasold 15'; Kolojejchick 18', 28', 32', 36'; Witmer 20', 55'; O'Donnell 26', 60'; K. Reinprecht 33'; Dawson 35'; Fee 40'; González 43'; Falgowski 46'	Report

Umpires:
Verónica Villafañe (ARG)
Megan Robertson (CAN)

20 July 2015
19:30

Canada	2–0	Uruguay
Raye 37'; Johansen 50'	Report

Umpires:
Michelle Joubert (RSA)
Camila Cabargas (CHI)

==== Fifth to eighth place classification ====
Crossover
July 22 — Toronto
Cuba	0
Mexico	1
July 22 — Toronto
Uruguay	7
Dominican Republic	1

Fifth place
July 24 — Toronto
Mexico	1 (2)
Uruguay	1 (3)
Seventh place
July 24 — Toronto
Cuba	1
Dominican Republic	2

===== Crossover =====
22 July 2015
09:00

Cuba	0–1	Mexico
	Report	C. Correa 10'

Umpires:
Camila Cabargas (CHI)
Nur Hafizah Azman (MAS)

22 July 2015
11:30

Uruguay	7–1	Dominican Republic
Norbis 13', 20'; Casarotti 31'; Coates 36'; Vilar del Valle 48', 50'; Stanley 49'	Report	Ortega Mateo 17'

Umpires:
Stephanie Judefind (USA)
Megan Robertson (CAN)

===== Seventh and eighth place =====
24 July 2015
09:00

Cuba	1–2	Dominican Republic
Vera 59'	Report	Ortega Mateo 19'; Oflaherti Paganini 34'

Umpires:
Nur Hafizah Azman (MAS)
Verónica Villafañe (ARG)

===== Fifth and sixth place =====
24 July 2015
11:30

Mexico	1–1	Uruguay
Marlet Correa 24'	Report	Casarotti 44'
Penalties
Orozco (penalty shoot-out missed); María Correa (penalty shoot-out missed); Marlet Correa (penalty shoot-out scored); Oviedo (penalty shoot-out scored); Navarro (penalty shoot-out missed)	2–3	Vilar del Valle (penalty shoot-out scored); Norbis (penalty shoot-out scored); Lamberti (penalty shoot-out scored); Villar (penalty shoot-out missed)

Umpires:
Meghan McLennan (CAN)
Megan Robertson (CAN)

==== First to fourth place classification ====
===== Semi-finals =====
22 July 2015
17:00

Argentina	5–0	Chile
Cavallero 6', 8'; Albertarrio 37'; Merino 44', 48'	Report

Umpires:
Michelle Joubert (RSA)
Suzi Sutton (USA)

22 July 2015
19:30

Canada	0–3	United States
	Report	Kolojejchick 9', 47'; Manley 58'

Umpires:
Soledad Iparraguirre (ARG)
Verónica Villafañe (ARG)

===== Bronze-medal match =====
24 July 2015
17:00

Chile	0–1	Canada (bronze)
	Report	Stairs 51'

Umpires:
Stephanie Judefind (USA)
Suzi Sutton (USA)

===== Gold medal match =====
24 July 2015
19:30

(silver) Argentina	1–2	United States (gold)
F. Habif 58'	Report	K. Reinprecht 34'; Vittese 40'

Umpires:
Aleesha Unka (NZL)
Ayanna McClean (TTO)

Team details

Argentina
United States

GK	1	Belén Succi
DF	14	Agustina Habif
DF	27	Noel Barrionuevo
DF	29	Julia Gomes Fantasia
MF	16	Florencia Habif
MF	17	Rocío Sánchez Moccia	12'
MF	24	Pilar Romang
FW	7	Martina Cavallero
FW	12	Delfina Merino	(yellow card) 60'
FW	19	Agustina Albertario
FW	30	Josefina Sruoga
Substitutions:
DF	5	Macarena Rodríguez		(substituted on) 14'
MF	6	Jimena Cedrés		(substituted on) 10'
FW	20	Luciana Molina		(substituted on) 8'
MF	26	Paula Ortiz		(substituted on) 12'
Manager:
(Argentina) Santiago Capurro

GK	31	Jackie Briggs
DF	8	Rachel Dawson
DF	12	Julia Reinprecht
DF	23	Katelyn Falgowski
DF	27	Lauren Crandall (c)
MF	5	Melissa González
MF	7	Kelsey Kolojejchick
MF	14	Katie Reinprecht
MF	18	Michelle Kasold
FW	16	Katie O'Donnell
FW	21	Paige Selenski
Substitutions:
DF	2	Stefanie Fee		(substituted on) 8'
MF	9	Michelle Vittese	37'		(substituted on) 3'
FW	10	Jill Witmer		(substituted on) 4'
MF	13	Emily Wold		(substituted on) 8'
DF	29	Alyssa Manley		(substituted on) 8'
Manager:
(England) Craig Parnham

== Statistics ==
=== Final standings ===
As per statistical convention in field hockey, matches decided in extra time are counted as wins and losses, while matches decided by penalty shoot-outs are counted as draws.

Pos	Grp	Team	Pld	W	D	L	GF	GA	GD	Pts	Final result
1st place, gold medalist(s)	B	United States	6	6	0	0	39	1	+38	18	Gold medal
2nd place, silver medalist(s)	A	Argentina	6	5	0	1	42	2	+40	15	Silver medal
3rd place, bronze medalist(s)	A	Canada (H)	6	4	0	2	19	9	+10	12	Bronze medal
4	B	Chile	6	3	0	3	17	10	+7	9	Fourth place
5	B	Uruguay	6	2	1	3	11	14	−3	7	Eliminated in quarterfinals
6	A	Mexico	6	1	2	3	3	22	−19	5	Eliminated in quarterfinals
7	A	Dominican Republic	6	1	1	4	5	48	−43	4	Eliminated in quarterfinals
8	B	Cuba	6	0	0	6	5	35	−30	0	Eliminated in quarterfinals

Source: FIH
(H) Hosts

=== Goalscorers ===
There were 141 goals scored in 24 matches, for an average of 5.88 goals per match.

9 goals

- (Argentina) Noel Barrionuevo

7 goals

- (United States) Kelsey Kolojejchick

6 goals

- (Argentina) Delfina Merino

5 goals

- (Argentina) Agustina Albertario
- (Argentina) Rocío Sánchez
- (United States) Jill Witmer

4 goals

- (Argentina) Florencia Habif
- (Canada) Karli Johansen
- (Chile) Manuela Urroz
- (United States) Katie Reinprecht
- (United States) Katie O'Donnell

3 goals

- (Argentina) Pilar Romang
- (Canada) Kate Gillis
- (Canada) Stephanie Norlander
- (Chile) Carolina García
- (United States) Katelyn Falgowski
- (United States) Melissa González
- (United States) Michelle Kasold
- (United States) Paige Selenski
- (United States) Michelle Vittese
- (Uruguay) Manuela Vilar del Valle

2 goals

- (Argentina) Martina Cavallero
- (Argentina) Julia Gomes
- (Argentina) Paula Ortíz
- (Argentina) Luciana Molina
- (Argentina) Macarena Rodríguez
- (Canada) Thea Culley
- (Canada) Hannah Haughn
- (Canada) Danielle Hennig
- (Chile) Camila Caram
- (Chile) Daniela Caram
- (Chile) Javiera Villagra
- (Cuba) Marisbel Sierra
- (Cuba) Yuraima Vera Rojas
- (Dominican Republic) Cecilia O'Flaherti
- (Dominican Republic) Magalys Ortega
- (United States) Rachel Dawson
- (Uruguay) Cecilia Casarotti
- (Uruguay) Florencia Norbis

1 goal

- (Canada) Abigail Raye
- (Canada) Madeline Secco
- (Canada) Brienne Stairs
- (Chile) Sofía Filipek
- (Chile) Francisca Pizarro
- (Chile) Agustina Venegas
- (Chile) Francisca Vidaurre
- (Cuba) Yaniuska Paso
- (Dominican Republic) Benifer Moronta
- (Mexico) Cindy Correa
- (Mexico) Marlet Correa
- (Mexico) Jessica Sánchez
- (United States) Stefanie Fee
- (United States) Alyssa Manley
- (Uruguay) Constanza Barrandeguy
- (Uruguay) Mercedes Coates
- (Uruguay) Anastasia Olave
- (Uruguay) Janine Stanley

== See also ==
- Field hockey at the 2016 Summer Olympics – Women's tournament
