= 2018–19 Women's Belgian Hockey League =

Belgian Hockey League
- Season: 2018–19
- Dates: 2 September 2018 – 12 May 2019
- Champions: Antwerp
- Regular season: Antwerp (19th title)
- Matches played: 127

The 2018–19 Women's Belgian Hockey League was the 94th season of the Women's Belgian Hockey League, the top women's Belgian field hockey league.

The season started on 2 September 2018 and concluded on 12 May 2019 with the second match of the championship final.

== Format ==
The season was played with a total of twelve teams. Two pools of six were formed, based on rankings from the previous season.

Pool A: 1, 4, 5, 8, 9, National 1 (Team 2)
Pool B: 2, 3, 6, 7, 10, National 1 (Team 1)

Teams in each pool played each other twice throughout the season, while playing teams from the other pool once. At the conclusion of the pool stage, the top four teams from each pool advanced to the play–offs, while the remaining teams moved forward to the relegation matches.

== Teams ==
2018–19 Women's Belgian Hockey League teams
Location of Brussels teams in the 2018–19 Women's Belgian Hockey League

Team	Location	Province
Antwerp	Sint-Job-in-'t-Goor	Antwerp
Braxgata	Boom	Antwerp
Dragons	Brasschaat	Antwerp
Gantoise	Ghent	East Flanders
Léopold	Uccle	Brussels
Leuven	Heverlee	Flemish Brabant
Namur	Namur	Namur
Racing	Uccle	Brussels
Victory	Edegem	Antwerp
Waterloo Ducks	Waterloo	Walloon Brabant
Wellington	Uccle	Brussels
White Star	Evere	Brussels

=== Number of teams by provinces ===
Province	Number of teams	Team(s)
Antwerp	4	Antwerp, Braxgata, Dragons, Victory
Brussels	4	Léopold, Racing, Wellington, White Star
East Flanders	1	Gantoise
Flemish Brabant	1	Leuven
Namur	1	Namur
Walloon Brabant	1	Waterloo Ducks
Total	12	

== Regular season ==
=== Pool A ===
Pos	Team	Pld	W	D	L	GF	GA	GD	Pts	Qualification	GAN	WAT	DRA	VIC	WHI	NAM
1	Gantoise	16	15	1	0	53	13	+40	46	Advanced to Play–offs	—	1–0	3–1	6–0	8–3	1–0
2	Waterloo Ducks	16	9	5	2	35	18	+17	32	Advanced to Play–offs	1–1	—	3–0	2–1	2–0	3–1
3	Dragons	16	5	5	6	34	34	0	20	Advanced to Play–offs	0–1	3–1	—	1–2	4–4	4–1
4	Victory	16	5	5	6	22	29	−7	20	Advanced to Play–offs	1–2	1–3	2–2	—	1–1	4–2
5	White Star	16	2	5	9	25	46	−21	11	Play–downs	0–3	1–3	2–2	2–3	—	3–1
6	Namur	16	0	0	16	10	75	−65	0	Play–downs	0–8	0–4	0–7	1–2	2–3	—

Source: OKEY
Rules for classification: 1) points; 2) matches won; 3) goal difference; 4) goals for; 5) head-to-head result.

=== Pool B ===
Pos	Team	Pld	W	D	L	GF	GA	GD	Pts	Qualification	BRA	LEU	RAC	ANT	WEL	LÉO
1	Braxgata	16	9	5	2	48	18	+30	32	Advanced to Play–offs	—	3–3	0–1	0–0	1–0	6–2
2	Leuven	16	9	3	4	35	26	+9	30	Advanced to Play–offs	1–3	—	2–1	1–2	5–2	3–1
3	Racing	16	7	3	6	28	18	+10	24	Advanced to Play–offs	1–2	0–1	—	3–1	1–0	2–0
4	Antwerp	16	5	6	5	23	14	+9	21	Advanced to Play–offs	0–1	0–1	1–1	—	0–0	0–0
5	Wellington	16	3	4	9	19	30	−11	13	Play–downs	0–0	3–4	2–1	0–4	—	0–1
6	Léopold	16	5	2	9	18	29	−11	17	Play–downs	0–3	0–1	1–2	1–0	2–3	—

Source: OKEY
Rules for classification: 1) points; 2) matches won; 3) goal difference; 4) goals for; 5) head-to-head result.

=== Results ===
The following results represent the crossover matches between pools A and B.

Home \ Away	ANT	BRA	DRA	GAN	LÉO	LEU	NAM	RAC	VIC	WAT	WEL	WHI
Antwerp	—						6–0			1–1		3–0
Braxgata		—					13–0			4–4		3–2
Dragons	1–1	0–6	—					3–2				
Gantoise	4–2	3–2		—				2–1				
Léopold			3–2	0–3	—				1–2			
Leuven			2–2	2–5		—			1–0			
Namur					1–3	0–5	—				0–4	
Racing							5–1	—		1–1		5–0
Victory	0–2	1–1						1–1	—			
Waterloo Ducks					1–1	2–1				—	4–1	
Wellington			1–2	0–2					1–1		—	
White Star					0–2	2–2					2–2	—

Source: OKEY
Legend: Blue = home team win; Yellow = draw; Red = away team win.

== Play–downs ==
Pos	Team	Pld	W	D	L	GF	GA	GD	Pts	Qualification	WHI	LÉO	WEL	NAM
1	White Star	6	3	3	0	10	4	+6	12		—	1–1	1–1	3–1
2	Léopold	6	3	2	1	10	4	+6	11		0–0	—	1–0	2–0
3	Wellington	6	3	1	2	15	5	+10	10	Relegated to National 1	0–1	3–2	—	7–0
4	Namur	6	0	0	6	2	24	−22	0	Relegated to National 1	1–4	0–4	0–4	—

Source: OKEY
Rules for classification: 1) points; 2) matches won; 3) goal difference; 4) goals for; 5) head-to-head result.

== Play–offs ==
=== Bracket ===
Quarter-finals
14–28 April
Gantoise	1	3	4
Antwerp (s.o.)	1	3	4
14–28 April
Leuven	2	2	4
Dragons	1	0	1
14–28 April
Waterloo Ducks	0	3	3
Racing (s.o.)	1	2	3
14–28 April
Braxgata	4	0	4
Victory	2	1	3

Semi-finals
1–5 May
Antwerp (s.o.)	1	2	3
Leuven	2	1	3
1–5 May
Racing	4	1	5
Braxgata	1	2	3

Final
11–12 May
Antwerp	2	3	5
Racing	1	1	2
Third place
12 May
Leuven	3
Braxgata	0

=== Quarter-finals ===
14 April 2019
12:00

Antwerp	1–1	Gantoise
Neal 61'	Report	Granatto 49'

Royal Antwerp HC, Antwerp
Umpires:
Thimothy Hennes (BEL)
Didier van den Eede (BEL)

28 April 2019
12:00

Gantoise	3–3	Antwerp
Gerniers 2'; Granatto 49', 50'	Report	Berends 35'; Wisniewska 43'; Delforge 51'
Penalties
S. Vanden Borre (penalty shoot-out missed); A. Vanden Borre (penalty shoot-out missed); Johnston (penalty shoot-out missed)	0–3	(penalty shoot-out scored) M. Struijk; (penalty shoot-out scored) Gloyn; (penalty shoot-out scored) Urroz

La Gantoise HC, Ghent
Umpires:
Eric Denis (BEL)
Florian Haine (BEL)

Antwerp won the series 3–0 in a shoot-out, following a 4–4 tie on aggregate.

14 April 2019
12:00

Dragons	1–2	Leuven
Jakus 20'	Report	Van Dieren 3'; Stairs 6'

KHC Dragons, Braschaat
Umpires:
Céline Martin-Schmets (BEL)
Lucien Vanderborght (BEL)

28 April 2019
12:00

Leuven	2–0	Dragons
Scheers 10'; Stairs 55'	Report

KHC Leuven, Leuven
Umpires:
Michael Bourg (BEL)
Anne van den Bosch (BEL)

Leuven won the series 2–0.

14 April 2019
12:00

Racing	1–0	Waterloo Ducks
Boon 63'	Report

Racing Club de Bruxelles, Uccle
Umpires:
Christophe Pontus (BEL)
Magali Sergeant (BEL)

28 April 2019
12:00

Waterloo Ducks	3–2	Racing
Ronquetti 1', 58'; De Mot 33'	Report	Patriarche 24'; Boon 36'
Penalties
Ronguetti (penalty shoot-out missed); Blockmans (penalty shoot-out scored); Peeters (penalty shoot-out missed); Gose (penalty shoot-out scored)	2–3	(penalty shoot-out missed) A. Willems; (penalty shoot-out scored) Raes; (penalty shoot-out scored) Boon; (penalty shoot-out scored) Englebert; (penalty shoot-out scored) Patriarche

Waterloo Ducks HC, Waterloo
Umpires:
Thomas Dagnelie (BEL)
Didier van den Eede (BEL)

Racing won the series 3–2 in a shoot-out, following a 3–3 tie on aggregate.

14 April 2019
12:00

Victory	2–4	Braxgata
Contardi 3'; Secco 41'	Report	Leclef 7'; Versavel 19', 46'; Meyvis 63'

Royal Victory HC, Edegem
Umpires:
Alexandra Mahieu (BEL)
Corentin Hardy (BEL)

28 April 2019
12:00

Braxgata	0–1	Victory
	Report	Secco 49'

Braxgata HC, Boom
Umpires:
Virginie Hermans (BEL)
Corentin HArdy (BEL)

Braxgata won the series 4–3 on aggregate.

==== Fifth to eighth place classification ====
Crossover
1 May
Gantoise	4
Dragons	2
1 May
Waterloo Ducks	3 (4)
Victory (pen.)	3 (5)

Fifth Place
5 May
Gantoise	1
Victory	0
Seventh Place
5 May
Dragons	4 (2)
Waterloo Ducks (pen.)	4 (3)

===== Crossover =====
1 May 2019
13:30

Gantoise	4–2	Dragons
Granatto 6'; Johnston 42'; Gerniers 64'; S. Vanden Borre 68'	Report	Jakus 24'; D. Marien 59'

La Gantoise HC, Edegem

1 May 2019
13:30

Waterloo Ducks	3–3	Victory
Sinia 49'; Ronquetti 58'; Peeters 69'	Report	Contardi 17'; Secco 55'; Hennig 63'
Penalties
	4–5

Waterloo Ducks HC, Waterloo

===== Seventh and eighth place =====
5 May 2019
16:00

Dragons	4–4	Waterloo Ducks
De Groof 23'; A. Marien 52'; Struyf 54', 62'	Report	Gose 19', 41'; Peeters 40', 45'
Penalties
	2–3

KHC Dragons, Braschaat

===== Fifth and sixth place =====
5 May 2019
16:00

Gantoise	1–0	Victory
A. Vanden Borre 33'	Report

La Gantoise HC, Edegem

==== First to fourth place classification ====
===== Semi-finals =====
1 May 2019
13:30

Antwerp	1–2	Leuven
Wisniewska 35+'	Report	Van Dieren 53'; Chardome 64'

Royal Antwerp HC, Antwerp
Umpires:
Magali Sergeant (BEL)
Anne van den Bosch (BEL)

5 May 2019
12:00

Leuven	1–2	Antwerp
Wright 69'	Report	Puvrez 27', 56'
Penalties
	3–4

KHC Leuven, Leuven
Umpires:
Eric Denis (BEL)
Michael Bourg (BEL)

Antwerp won the series 4–3 in a shoot-out, following a 3–3 tie on aggregate.

1 May 2019
13:30

Racing	4–1	Braxgata
López 4'; Boon 21'; Englebert 32'; Patriarche 69'	Report	J. Vandermeiren 48'

Racing Club de Bruxelles, Uccle
Umpires:
Christophe Pontus (BEL)
Didier van den Eede (BEL)

5 May 2019
12:00

Braxgata	2–1	Racing
Nelen 6'; Fobe 58'	Report	Boon 48'

Braxgata HC, Boom
Umpires:
Céline Martin-Schmets (BEL)
Virginie Hermans (BEL)

Racing won the series 5–3 on aggregate.

===== Third and fourth place =====
12 May 2019
10:00

Leuven	3–0	Braxgata
McManus 39'; Norlander 42'; Chardome 53'	Report

Royal Herakles HC, Lier
Umpires:
Anne van den Bosch (BEL)
Virginie Hermans (BEL)

===== Final =====
11 May 2019
16:00

Racing	1–2	Antwerp
Letor 31'	Report	Neal 55'; Delforge 60'

Royal Herakles HC, Lier
Umpires:
Didier van den Eede (BEL)
Eric Denis (BEL)

12 May 2019
16:00

Antwerp	3–1	Racing
Puvrez 16'; Neal 24'; Urroz 67'	Report	Meulemans 47'

Royal Herakles HC, Lier
Umpires:
Céline Martin-Schmets (BEL)
Magali Sergeant (BEL)

Antwerp won the series 2–0, claiming the national title.
