= 2013 Women's Pan American Cup =

Tournament details
- Host country: Argentina
- City: Mendoza
- Dates: 21–28 September
- Teams: 8 (from 1 confederation)
- Venue: Estadio Mendocino de Hockey

Final positions
- Champions: Argentina (4th title)
- Runner-up: United States
- Third place: Canada

Tournament statistics
- Matches played: 20
- Goals scored: 120 (6 per match)
- Top scorer: (Argentina) Carla Rebecchi (10 goals)
- Best player: (Argentina) Luciana Aymar
- Best goalkeeper: (Chile) Claudia Schüler

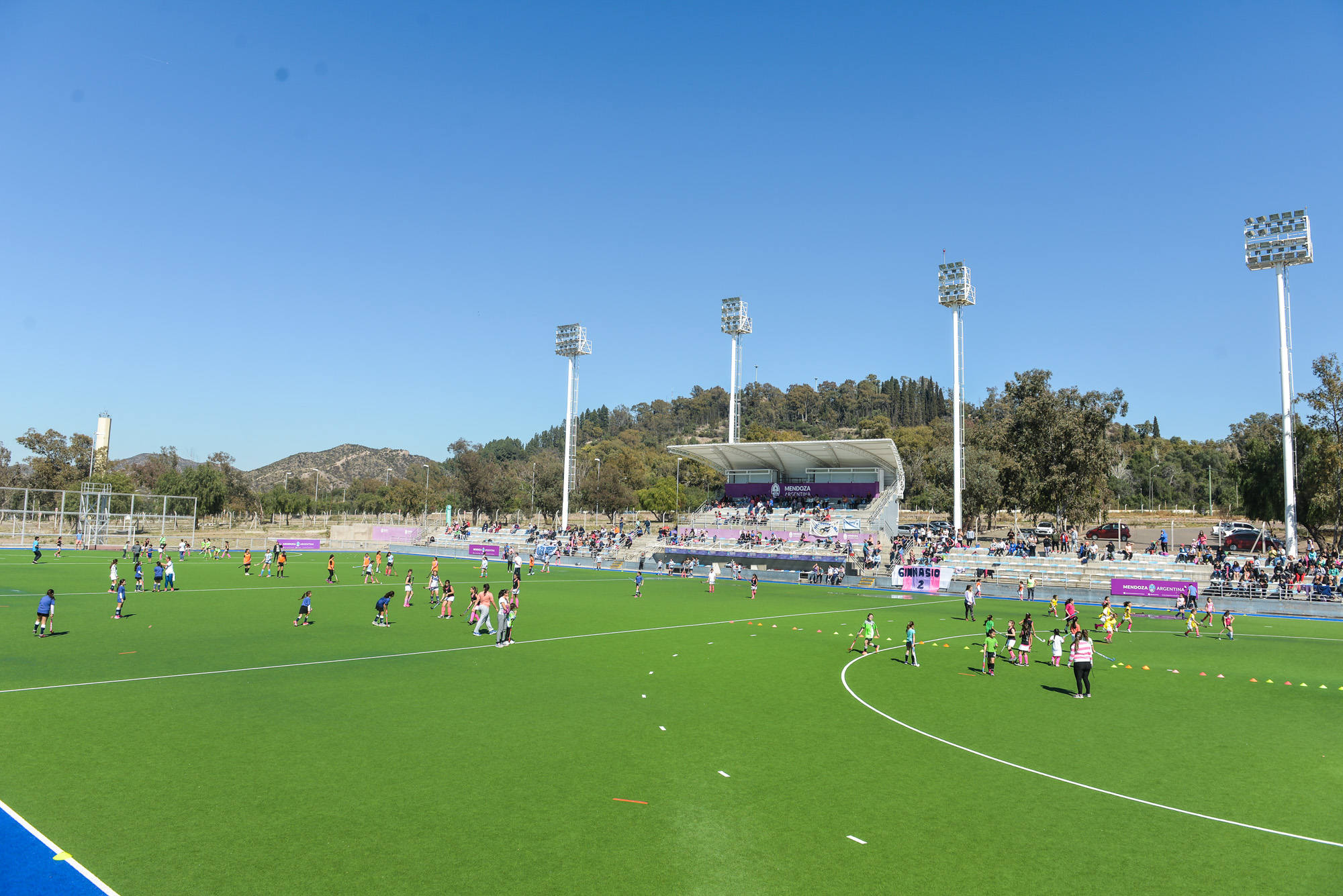
Estadio Mendocino de Hockey, venue

The 2013 Women's Pan American Cup was the fourth edition of the Women's Pan American Cup, the quadrennial international women's field hockey championship of the Americas organised by the Pan American Hockey Federation. It was held between 21 and 28 September 2013 in Mendoza, Argentina.

The tournament doubled as the qualifier for two major international tournaments: the winner would qualify directly to the 2014 Hockey World Cup, and the three teams not qualifying through the 2014 South American Championship or the 2014 Central American and Caribbean Games would qualify for the 2015 Pan American Games to be held in Toronto, Canada.

Argentina won the tournament for the fourth consecutive time after defeating the United States 1–0 in the final. As they had already secured an automatic berth at the 2014 Hockey World Cup to defend their title obtained in 2010 thanks to a third-place finish at the World League Semifinal in London, England, their quota was immediately awarded to third reserve team, the United States.

== Qualification ==
In early 2011 the Pan American Hockey Federation (PAHF) announced a new qualification system for Pan American Cup, recognizing the differences in team strength of the top playing nations and the remaining associations. The top six nations at the 2009 Pan American Cup now will qualify directly with the remaining two spots being taken at the newly created Pan American Challenge, which was held in 2011 in Rio de Janeiro, Brazil.

| Dates | Event | Location | Quotas | Qualifiers |
|---|---|---|---|---|
| 7–15 February 2009 | 2009 Pan American Cup | Hamilton, Bermuda | 6 | Argentina; United States; Chile; Trinidad and Tobago; Canada; Mexico |
| 31 July – 7 August 2011 | 2011 Pan American Challenge | Rio de Janeiro, Brazil | 2 | Uruguay; Guyana |
| Total | | | 8 | |

== Umpires ==
Below are the 10 umpires appointed by the Pan American Hockey Federation:

- Frances Block (ENG)
- Mary Driscoll (USA)
- Ayanna McClean (TRI)
- Meghan McLennan (CAN)
- Maritza Pérez Castro (URU)
- Megan Robertson (CAN)
- Maricel Sánchez (ARG)
- Leila Sacre (CAN)
- Suzie Sutton (USA)
- Verónica Villafañe (ARG)

== Results ==
All times are Argentina Time (UTC−03:00)

=== First round ===
Advanced to semi-finals

==== Pool A ====
| Team | Pld | W | D | L | GF | GA | GD | Pts |
|---|---|---|---|---|---|---|---|---|
| Argentina | 3 | 3 | 0 | 0 | 40 | 0 | +40 | 9 |
| Canada | 3 | 2 | 0 | 1 | 13 | 6 | +7 | 6 |
| Trinidad and Tobago | 3 | 1 | 0 | 2 | 1 | 17 | −16 | 3 |
| Guyana | 3 | 0 | 0 | 3 | 0 | 31 | −31 | 0 |

21 September 2013
18:30

| Canada | 8–0 | Guyana |
|---|---|---|
| Haughn 5'; Culley 15', 53'; Raye 20'; Barnett 32'; Karringten 43'; Stairs 55'; Norlander 67' | Report |

Umpires:
Suzi Sutton (USA)
Maritza Pérez Castro (URU)

21 September 2013
21:00

| Argentina | 12–0 | Trinidad and Tobago |
|---|---|---|
| Rebecchi 7', 36', 55', 60'; Cavallero 14', 49', 52'; Aymar 25', 51', 70'; Merino 29'; Barrionuevo 58' | Report |

Umpires:
Meghan McLennan (CAN)
Megan Robertson (CAN)

22 September 2013
18:30

| Trinidad and Tobago | 1–0 | Guyana |
|---|---|---|
| 4' | Report |

Umpires:
Maricel Sanchéz (ARG)
Mary Driscoll (USA)

22 September 2013
21:00

| Canada | 0–6 | Argentina |
|---|---|---|
| | Report | Aymar 16'; Rebecchi 20', 46'; Albertario 32'; Barrionuevo 59', 60' |

Umpires:
Frances Block (ENG)
Ayanna McClean (TRI)

24 September 2013
18:30

| Trinidad and Tobago | 0–5 | Canada |
|---|---|---|
| | Report | Haughn 27'; Norlander 61'; Stairs 64'; Karringten 69'; Culley 70' |

Umpires:
Maritza Pérez Castro (URU)
Suzi Sutton (USA)

24 September 2013
21:00

| Argentina | 22–0 | Guyana |
|---|---|---|
| Cavallero 2', 8', 16'; Rebecchi 6', 24', 37', 41'; Sruoga 12', 27'; Merino 17', 30'; Luchetti 21', 58', 63'; Barrionuevo 35+', 70+'; Aymar 45', 47', 51', 61'; Albertario 53'; D'Elía 69' | Report |

Umpires:
Lelia Sacre (CAN)
Megan McLennan (CAN)

==== Pool B ====
| Team | Pld | W | D | L | GF | GA | GD | Pts |
|---|---|---|---|---|---|---|---|---|
| United States | 3 | 3 | 0 | 0 | 17 | 2 | +15 | 9 |
| Chile | 3 | 1 | 1 | 1 | 10 | 5 | +5 | 4 |
| Uruguay | 3 | 1 | 1 | 1 | 5 | 6 | −1 | 4 |
| Mexico | 3 | 0 | 0 | 3 | 0 | 19 | −19 | 0 |

21 September 2013
13:30

| United States | 6–0 | Mexico |
|---|---|---|
| Falgowski 8'; Montgomery 11'; O'Donnell 25'; Reinprecht 39', 52'; Selenski 67' | Report |

Umpires:
Maricel Sanchéz (ARG)
Lelia Sacre (CAN)

21 September 2013
16:00

| Chile | 0–0 | Uruguay |
|---|---|---|
| | Report |

Umpires:
Frances Block (ENG)
Mary Driscoll (USA)

22 September 2013
13:30

| Chile | 1–5 | United States |
|---|---|---|
| Urroz 7' | Report | Sharkey 9'; Kasold 22'; Gonzalez 41'; Crandall 50'; Selenski 65' |

Umpires:
Maritza Pérez Castro (URU)
Megan Robertson (CAN)

22 September 2013
16:00

| Mexico | 0–4 | Uruguay |
|---|---|---|
| | Report | Vilar del Valle 12'; Stanley 16'; Coates 29'; Vega 68' |

Umpires:
Suzi Sutton (USA)
Meghan McLennan (CAN)

24 September 2013
13:30

| Mexico | 0–9 | Chile |
|---|---|---|
| | Report | 4'; Urroz 21'; Vidaurre 26', 31'; D. Caram 34', 67'; C. Caram 44', 47', 63' |

Umpires:
Ayanna McClean (TRI)
Megan Robertson (CAN)

24 September 2013
16:00

| United States | 6–1 | Uruguay |
|---|---|---|
| Dawson 6'; Kolojejchick 16'; Taylor 24'; Sharkey 35'; Selenski 38'; Reinprecht 68' | Report | Taborda 64' |

Umpires:
Frances Block (ENG)
Maricel Sanchéz (ARG)

=== Fifth to eighth place classification ===
Cross-overs
26 September
Uruguay | 6
Guyana | 0
26 September
Trinidad & Tobago | 4 (2)
Mexico (p.s.o.) | 4 (3)

Fifth place
28 September
Uruguay | 1 (3)
Mexico (p.s.o.) | 1 (4)
Seventh place
28 September
Guyana | 2
Trinidad & Tobago | 3

==== Cross-overs ====
26 September 2013
11:30

| Uruguay | 6–0 | Guyana |
|---|---|---|
| Lamberti 2', 61'; Villar 23'; Dall Orso 32'; Coates 47'; Kliche 55' | Report |

Umpires:
Ayanna McClean (TRI)
Meghan McLennan (CAN)

26 September 2013
14:00

| Trinidad and Tobago | 4–4 | Mexico |
|---|---|---|
| Thompson 23'; Wynne 32', 70'; Henry 51' | Report | Navarro 17'; Mari. Correa 35'; Salazar 40'; Rivera 65' |
Penalties
| Wynne (penalty shoot-out scored); Govia (penalty shoot-out missed); Lewis (penalty shoot-out missed); Thompson (penalty shoot-out scored); Hingh (penalty shoot-out missed) | 2–3 | (penalty shoot-out missed) Salazar; (penalty shoot-out scored) Mari. Correa; (penalty shoot-out missed) Marl. Correa; (penalty shoot-out scored) Oviedo; (penalty shoot-out scored) Navarro |

Umpires:
Mary Driscoll (USA)
Lelia Sacre (CAN)

==== Seventh and eighth place ====
28 September 2013
11:30

| Guyana | 2–3 | Trinidad and Tobago |
|---|---|---|
| Woodroffe 35'; Gordon 43' | Report | Lewis 58' de Gannes 63'; Wynne 65' |

Umpires:
Meghan McLennan (CAN)
Mary Driscoll (USA)

==== Fifth and sixth place ====
28 September 2013
14:00

| Uruguay | 1–1 | Mexico |
|---|---|---|
| Vilar del Valle 10' | Report | Salazar 17' |
Penalties
| Vilar del Valle (penalty shoot-out scored); Mora (penalty shoot-out scored); Stanley (penalty shoot-out missed); Lamberti (penalty shoot-out scored); Olave (penalty shoot-out missed) | 3–4 | (penalty shoot-out scored) Salazar; (penalty shoot-out scored) Carmona; (penalty shoot-out scored) Marl. Correa; (penalty shoot-out scored) Oviedo; (penalty shoot-out missed) Mari. Correa |

Umpires:
Maricel Sánchez (ARG)
Leila Sacre (CAN)

=== First to fourth place classification ===
Semi-finals
26 September
United States | 4
Canada | 0
26 September
Argentina | 5
Chile | 0

Final
28 September
United States | 0
Argentina | 1
Third place
28 September
Canada | 2
Chile | 1

==== Semi-finals ====
26 September 2013
18:30

| United States | 4–0 | Canada |
|---|---|---|
| Reinprecht 42'; Sharkey 48'; Taylor 59'; Dawson 67' | Report |

Umpires:
Maritza Pérez Castro (URU)
Maricel Sanchéz (ARG)

26 September 2013
21:00

| Argentina | 5–0 | Chile |
|---|---|---|
| D'Elía 7'; Sruoga 47'; Albertario 57', 66'; Aymar 64' | Report |

Umpires:
Megan Robertson (CAN)
Suzi Sutton (USA)

==== Third and fourth place ====
28 September 2013
18:30

| Canada | 2–1 | Chile |
|---|---|---|
| Culley 9', 38' | Report | Vidaurre 33' |

Umpires:
Suzi Sutton (USA)
Maritza Pérez Castro (URU)

==== Final ====
28 September 2013
21:00

| United States | 0–1 | Argentina |
|---|---|---|
| | Report | Merino 55' |

Umpires:
Frances Block (ENG)
Ayanna McClean (TRI)

Team details

United States
Argentina

| GK | 6 | Alesha Widdall |
| DF | 2 | Stefanie Fee |
| DF | 27 | Lauren Crandall (c) |
| DF | 32 | Jamie Montgomery |
| MF | 5 | Melissa González |
| MF | 8 | Rachel Dawson | (yellow card) 50' |
| MF | 14 | Katie Reinprecht | 39 |
| MF | 18 | Michelle Kasold |
| MF | 23 | Katelyn Falgowski |
| FW | 16 | Katie O'Donnell Bam |
| FW | 21 | Paige Selenski |
Substitutions:
| MF | 7 | Kelsey Kolojejchick | | (substituted on) 13' |
| | 11 | Shannon Taylor | | (substituted on) 7' |
| DF | 15 | Meghan Beamesderfer | | (substituted on) 14' |
| FW | 17 | Jill Witmer | | (substituted on) 6' |
| MF | 24 | Kathleen Sharkey | | (substituted on) 11' |
| DF | 28 | Caitlin Van Sickle | | (substituted on) 20' |
Coach:
(England) Craig Parnham

| GK | 28 | Belén Succi |
| DF | 2 | Mariana Rossi |
| DF | 5 | Macarena Rodríguez |
| DF | 25 | Silvina D'Elía |
| DF | 27 | Noel Barrionuevo |
| MF | 4 | Rosario Luchetti | 16 | (yellow card) 35' |
| MF | 16 | Florencia Habif |
| MF | 18 | Daniela Sruoga | (yellow card) 45' |
| MF | 8 | Luciana Aymar (c) |
| FW | 7 | Martina Cavallero |
| FW | 11 | Carla Rebecchi |
Substitutions:
| FW | 17 | Rocío Sánchez Moccia | | (substituted on) 12' |
| FW | 12 | Delfina Merino | | (substituted on) 12' |
| FW | 19 | Agustina Albertario | | (substituted on) 22' |
Coach:
(Argentina) Emanuel Roggero

== Statistics ==
=== Final standings ===
| Rank | Team |
|---|---|
| 1st place, gold medalist(s) | Argentina |
| 2nd place, silver medalist(s) | United States |
| 3rd place, bronze medalist(s) | Canada |
| 4 | Chile |
| 5 | Mexico |
| 6 | Uruguay |
| 7 | Trinidad and Tobago |
| 8 | Guyana |

=== Awards ===
| Top Goalscorer | Player of the Tournament | Goalkeeper of the Tournament | Fair Play Trophy |
|---|---|---|---|
| (Argentina) Carla Rebecchi | (Argentina) Luciana Aymar | (Chile) Claudia Schüler | Guyana |

== See also ==
- 2013 Men's Pan American Cup
