= Kathleen Sharkey =

American field hockey player

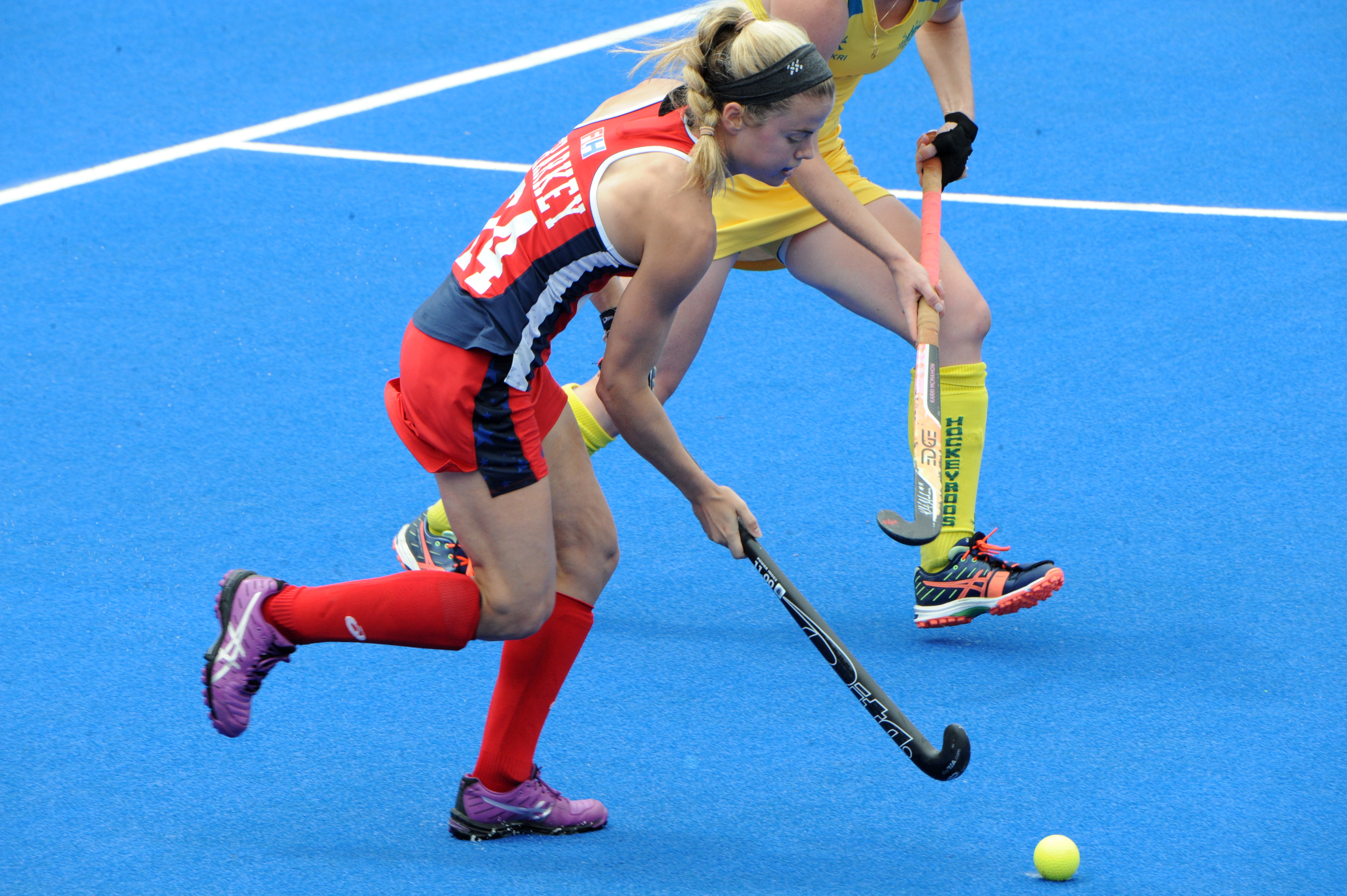
- Sharkey in 2016

Personal information
- Born: April 30, 1990 (age 36) Kingston, Pennsylvania, U.S.
- Height: 5 ft 4 in (163 cm)
- Weight: 128 lb (58 kg)

Sport
- Sport: Field hockey
- Position: Midfield/Forward
- Club: Valley Styx
National team
Years	Team	Caps	Goals
2011–	United States	176	-
Medal record
Pan American Cup
Silver medal – second place	2013 Mendoza	Team
Bronze medal – third place	2017 Lancaster	Team
Pan American Games
Bronze medal – third place	2019 Lima	Team

Kathleen Sharkey (born April 30, 1990) is an American field hockey player. In 2016, she was named to the United States women's national field hockey team for the Summer Olympics in Rio de Janeiro.

== Early life ==
Kathleen Sharkey was born on April 30, 1990. She grew up in Moosic, Pennsylvania with three siblings, including an older sister. Watching her older sister, Laura, play field hockey sparked Sharkey's interest in the sport. She went on to play field hockey at Wyoming Seminary.

== Collegiate field hockey player ==
Playing as a striker for Princeton University, Sharkey set multiple all-time school field hockey records including career points (245), points in a season (85), goals in a career (107), goals in a season (38), most total goals and assists in a career (138), most goals in a game (6) and most points in a game (12). Sharkey led all of Division I women's field hockey in goals scored for 2010 and 2012. Sharkey finished her career with an average of 3.13 points per game, 7th all time. Sharkey led all of Division I women's field hockey in goals scored for 2010 and 2012. Sharkey was named two time Ivy League offensive player of the year. She was a 2010–2011 Honda Sports Award nominee for field hockey. In 2012, Sharkey was part of the team that won Princeton field hockey's first NCAA tournament.

== United States women's national field hockey player ==
Sharkey began training with the United States women's national field hockey team in 2011 while she was still in college. After graduating from Princeton, Sharkey moved to Lancaster, Pennsylvania to continue training with the national team. As part of the U.S. team, Sharkey was reunited with Princeton teammates Julia and Katie Reinprecht and Wyoming Seminary teammate Kelsey Kolojejchick. In the summer of 2015, Sharkey broke her ankle. She returned to the team in December 2015. On July 1, 2016 Sharkey was named to the United States team for the 2016 Summer Olympics in Rio de Janeiro.

In 2019, Sharkey was chosen as the flag bearer for the United States at the Pan American Games opening ceremonies. She was also the U.S. women's field hockey team captain for the tournament.

== Personal life ==
Sharkey is married to professional lacrosse player Tom Schreiber. The couple have a daughter, Lillian.
