= Mount Saint Joseph Academy (Flourtown, Pennsylvania) =

- Mount Saint Joseph Academy School Seal

Location
- 120 West Wissahickon Avenue; Flourtown, (Montgomery County), Pennsylvania 19031; United States; 40°5′43″N 75°13′2″W

Information
- Type: Private, Day, College-prep
- Motto: Spes Messis In Semine (The Hope Of The Harvest Is In The Seed)
- Religious affiliation: Roman Catholic
- Patron saint: Saint Joseph
- Established: 1858
- Founder: Sisters of St. Joseph of Philadelphia
- President: Sr. Charlene Diorka, SSJ
- Principal: Dr. Melissa Sullivan
- Grades: 9-12
- Gender: Girls
- Campus: The Mount
- Campus size: 78 acres
- Campus type: suburb
- Colors: Purple, White and Gold
- Slogan: "On the education of women largely depends the future of society."
- Athletics conference: PIAA
- Mascot: Magic
- Team name: Magic
- Accreditation: Middle States Association of Colleges and Schools
- National ranking: National Blue Ribbon School Top Catholic College Preparatory School - Education Insider
- Publication: The Muse (literary & art magazine)
- Newspaper: The Campanile
- Yearbook: The Sheaf
- Affiliation: Sisters of Saint Joseph
- Website: www.msjacad.org

Mount Saint Joseph Academy, commonly called The Mount, in Flourtown, Pennsylvania, is a Philadelphia-area all-female, Catholic, college preparatory school within the Archdiocese of Philadelphia. It was founded in 1858 by the Sisters of Saint Joseph. The academy was originally located in Philadelphia on the grounds of what is now Chestnut Hill College. Originally a boarding school, the academy began accepting day students in 1911. In 1928, this all girls high school was the first Catholic school to be approved by the Middle States Association accrediting agency. In response to the growth of the school and evolving educational needs, the Mount moved in 1961 to its present site, just outside the community of Chestnut Hill near Philadelphia. Since relocation to the new campus, the school has grown significantly.

== Academic program ==
After beginning with 20 students in 1858, the Mount has a present-day student body of 500. A private day school for girls in grades nine through twelve, the Mount offers a college preparatory education in a Catholic context. The Mount adopted intensive (block) scheduling in 1997. Students now take three or four credits per term (instead of six or seven) for a total of seven or eight credits per school year. Each class period is 80 minutes long and traditional year-long courses last for 16 weeks (September to January or January to June).

== Facilities ==
The school building, which was constructed during the 1960s, offers classrooms, a cafeteria, 600-seat auditorium, gymnasium, chapel, and choir room. In 1997 a new wing was completed, featuring a library/media center with computer, telecommunications and video capabilities; six classrooms; a computer/writing center, a guidance suite, and faculty areas which allow space for interdisciplinary projects and class preparations. In 2003 the art and theater rooms were renovated with additional space to become a painting and drawing room; a computer classroom with 25 computer graphics systems; separate rooms for ceramics and a kiln; and a classroom for theater arts. At the same time, the gym locker area was renovated to include a new locker room, a health class area, and a fitness center. On the campus grounds are an enclosed courtyard and playing fields. In the Fall 2004 a track field surrounding a soccer field was completed, along with two new softball fields. In 2013, a full renovation of the STEM (Science, Technology, Engineering and Math) Wing was completed and air conditioning was added to the academic wings. The school's celebrated crew team rows out of a Conshohocken boathouse along the Schuylkill River.

== Notable alumni ==
- Rose Hemingway (née Szczesniak), performer, 2011 Broadway musical revival of How to Succeed in Business Without Really Trying.
- Katie Reinprecht and Julia Reinprecht, members of the United States women's national field hockey team in the 2012 Summer Olympics
- Chierika Ukogu, Olympic rower for Nigeria in the 2016 Olympic Games

== The Mount Musicals ==
Besides the various talent shows, concerts and events scattered across the school year, The Mount puts on one musical a year in the fall semester. The most recent shows were Singin' in the Rain (Fall 2025), Roald Dahl's Matilda The Musical (Fall 2024), The Wizard of Oz (Fall 2023), Freaky Friday (Fall 2022), Godspell (Fall 2021), Little Women (Spring 2021), Mamma Mia! (Fall 2019), Grease (Fall 2018), Les Misérables School Edition (Fall 2017), Footloose (Fall 2016), Nice Work If You Can Get It (Fall 2015), West Side Story (Fall 2014), Legally Blonde The Musical (Fall 2013), Once Upon A Mattress (Fall 2012), Fame The Musical (Fall 2011), Hairspray (Fall 2010), Anything Goes (Fall 2009), 42d Street (Fall 2008), Me and My Girl (Fall 2007), Crazy For You (Fall 2006), Rodgers & Hammerstein's The King and I (Fall 2005), Annie (Fall 2004), Les Misérables (Fall 2003), Rodgers & Hammerstein's Cinderella (Fall 2002), Brigadoon (Fall 2001) Bye Bye Birdie (Fall 2000), and Meet Me In St. Louis (Fall 1999).
