= Belén Succi =

Argentine field hockey player

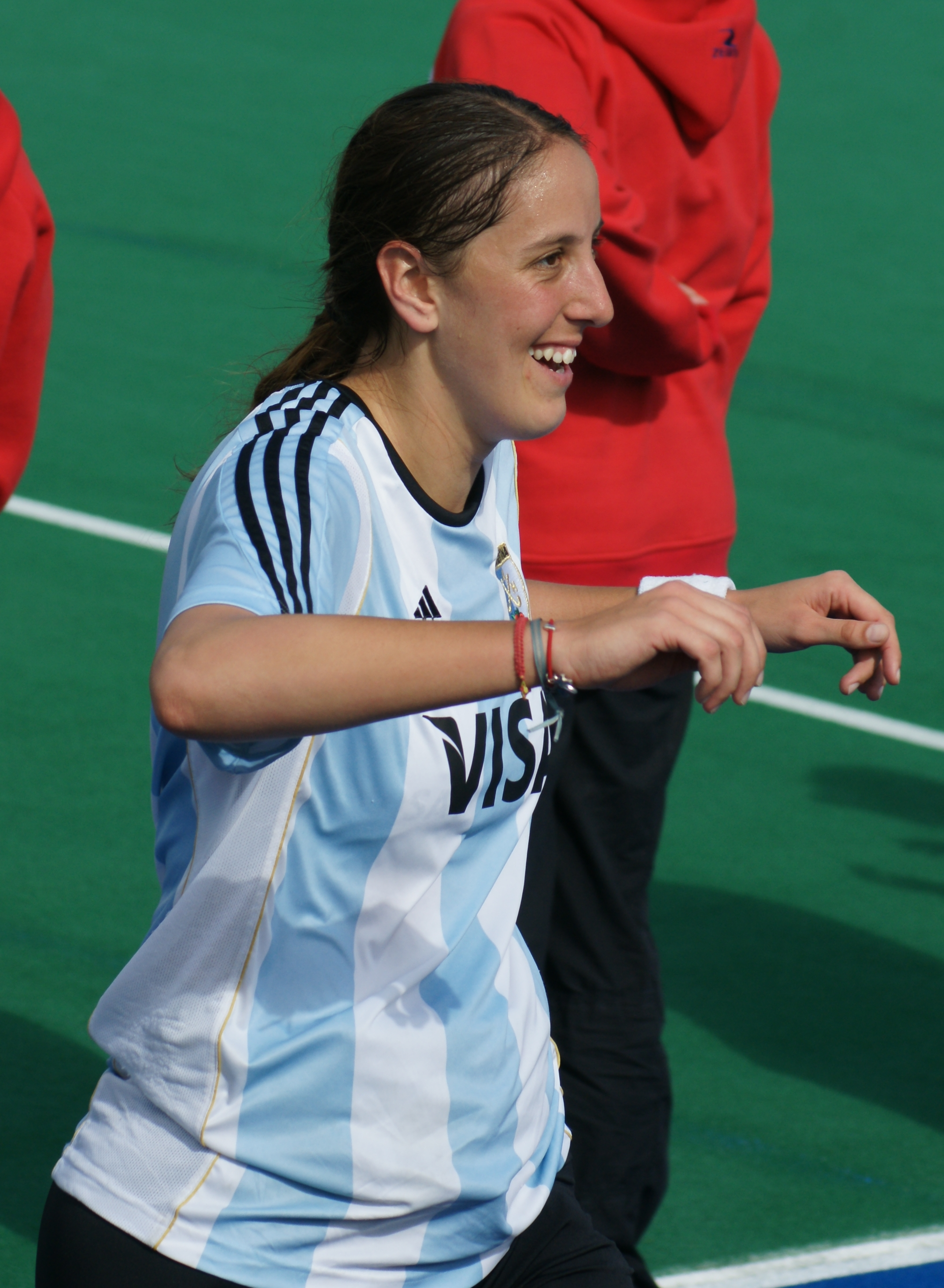
- Succi in 2009

Personal information
- Full name: María Belén Succi
- Born: 16 October 1985 (age 41) Buenos Aires, Argentina
- Height: 1.77 m (5 ft 10 in)
- Weight: 75 kg (165 lb)

Sport
- Sport: Field hockey
- Position: Goalkeeper
- Club: Club Atlético San Isidro
Senior career
Years	Team	Caps	Goals
–2021	CASI	-	-
2022	River Plate	-	-
2026	CASI	-	-
National team
Years	Team	Caps	Goals
2005	Argentina U21		-
2006–2022	Argentina	269	-
Medal record
Women's field hockey
Representing Argentina
Olympic Games
Silver medal – second place	2020 Tokyo	Team
Bronze medal – third place	2008 Beijing	Team
World Cup
Gold medal – first place	2010 Rosario
Silver medal – second place	2022 Terrassa/Amstelveen
Bronze medal – third place	2014 The Hague
World League
Gold medal – first place	2014-15 Rosario
Champions Trophy
Gold medal – first place	2008 Mönchengladbach
Gold medal – first place	2009 Sydney
Gold medal – first place	2010 Nottingham
Gold medal – first place	2012 Rosario
Gold medal – first place	2014 Mendoza
Gold medal – first place	2016 London
Silver medal – second place	2007 Quilmes
Silver medal – second place	2011 Amstelveen
Bronze medal – third place	2018 Changzhou
Pan American Games
Gold medal – first place	2007 Rio de Janeiro	Team
Gold medal – first place	2019 Lima	Team
Silver medal – second place	2011 Guadalajara	Team
Silver medal – second place	2015 Toronto	Team
Pan American Cup
Gold medal – first place	2009 Hamilton
Gold medal – first place	2013 Mendoza
Gold medal – first place	2017 Lancaster
Gold medal – first place	2022 Santiago

María Belén Succi (born 16 October 1985) is an Argentine field hockey goalkeeper. She plays with the Argentina national field hockey team, winning the bronze medal at the 2008 Summer Olympics in Beijing, and silver medal at the 2020 Summer Olympics.

== Career ==
She won the gold medal at the 2007 Pan American Games and 2019 Pan American Games, silver medal in 2015 Pan American Games and 2011 Pan American Games.

Belén also won the 2010 World Cup in Rosario, Argentina, six Champions Trophy, the World League 2014-15 and four Pan American Cups.
