= Delfina Merino =

Argentine Olympic field hockey player

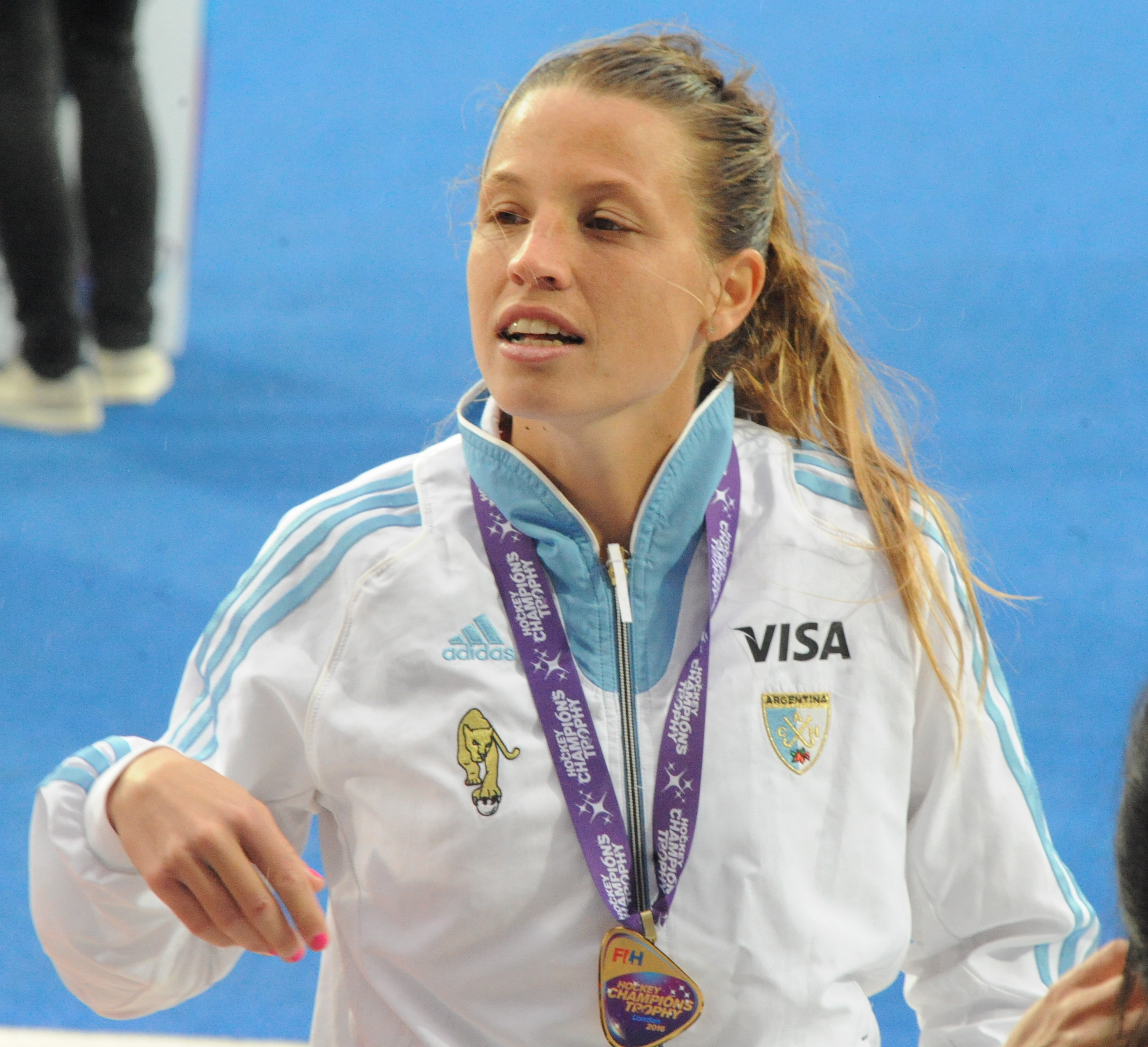
- Merino in 2016

Personal information
- Born: 15 October 1989 (age 36) Vicente López, Argentina
- Height: 1.68 m (5 ft 6 in)
- Weight: 59 kg (130 lb)

Sport
- Sport: Field hockey
- Position: Forward
- Club: Banco Provincia
Youth career
- Team
- –: Banco Provincia
Senior career
Years	Team	Caps	Goals
–2010	Banco Provincia	-	-
2010–2011	SCHC	-	-
2011–2016	Banco Provincia	-	-
2016–2017	SCHC	-	-
2018	Banco Provincia	-	-
2018–2019	SCHC	-	-
2019–2020	Banco Provincia	-	-
2021–	Léopold	-	-
National team
Years	Team	Caps	Goals
2008–2009	Argentina U21		-
2009–	Argentina	304	(87)
Medal record
Women's field hockey
Representing Argentina
Olympic Games
Silver medal – second place	2012 London	Team
Silver medal – second place	2020 Tokyo	Team
World Cup
Gold medal – first place	2010 Rosario
Bronze medal – third place	2014 The Hague
World League
Gold medal – first place	2014-15 Rosario
Champions Trophy
Gold medal – first place	2009 Sydney
Gold medal – first place	2010 Nottingham
Gold medal – first place	2012 Rosario
Gold medal – first place	2014 Mendoza
Gold medal – first place	2016 London
Silver medal – second place	2011 Amstelveen
Bronze medal – third place	2018 Changzhou
Pan American Games
Silver medal – second place	2011 Guadalajara	Team
Silver medal – second place	2015 Toronto	Team
Pan American Cup
Gold medal – first place	2009 Hamilton
Gold medal – first place	2013 Mendoza
Gold medal – first place	2017 Lancaster
Junior World Cup
Silver medal – second place	2009 Boston

Delfina Merino (born 15 October 1989) is an Argentine field hockey player. At the 2012 Summer Olympics, she competed for the Argentina national field hockey team and the team achieved the silver medal; at the 2020 Summer Olympics, she was part of the team that won the silver medal.

== Career ==
Delfina also won the 2010 World Cup in Rosario, Argentina, five Champions Trophy, the World League 2014–15 and three Pan American Cups. She was part of the 2016 Olympic squad.

In February 2018, she was elected as the best player in the world by the International Hockey Federation.

Preceded by Naomi van As	FIH Player of the Year; 2017	Succeeded by Eva de Goede
