= Back Campus Fields =

Canadian field hockey facility

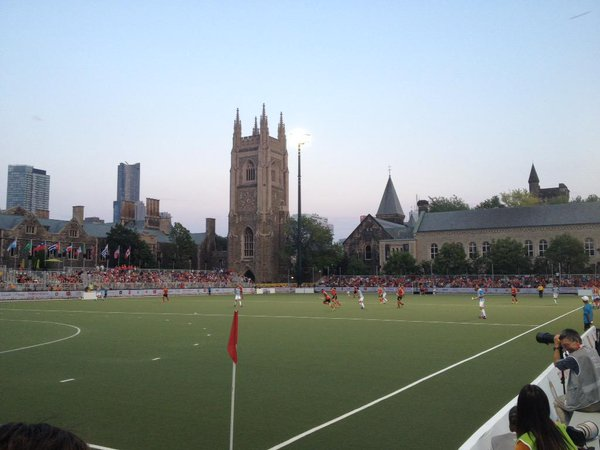
- The fields during the 2015 Pan American Games
- Interactive map of Back Campus Fields
- Location: University of Toronto St. George, Toronto, Ontario, Canada
- Coordinates: 43°39′49.9″N 79°23′46.8″W
- Owner: University of Toronto
- Capacity: 2,000 (temporary)
- Public transit: Toronto subway: at Museum at St. George TTC buses: 5A/B Avenue Road; 94A Wellesley; 142 Downtown/Avenue Rd Express

Construction
- Built: 2013–2014
- Opened: 2014

Tenants
- 2015 Pan American Games; 2015 Parapan American Games; Toronto Varsity Blues

The Back Campus Fields is a field hockey facility on the St. George campus of the University of Toronto in Toronto, Ontario, Canada. The facility is the home to the school's Toronto Varsity Blues field hockey team. The facility was built for the 2015 Pan American Games and hosted the field hockey competition for the games. The facility also hosted 5 and 7-a-side football competitions during the 2015 Parapan American Games. The facility was referred to as the Pan Am/Parapan Am Fields during the games.

== Development ==
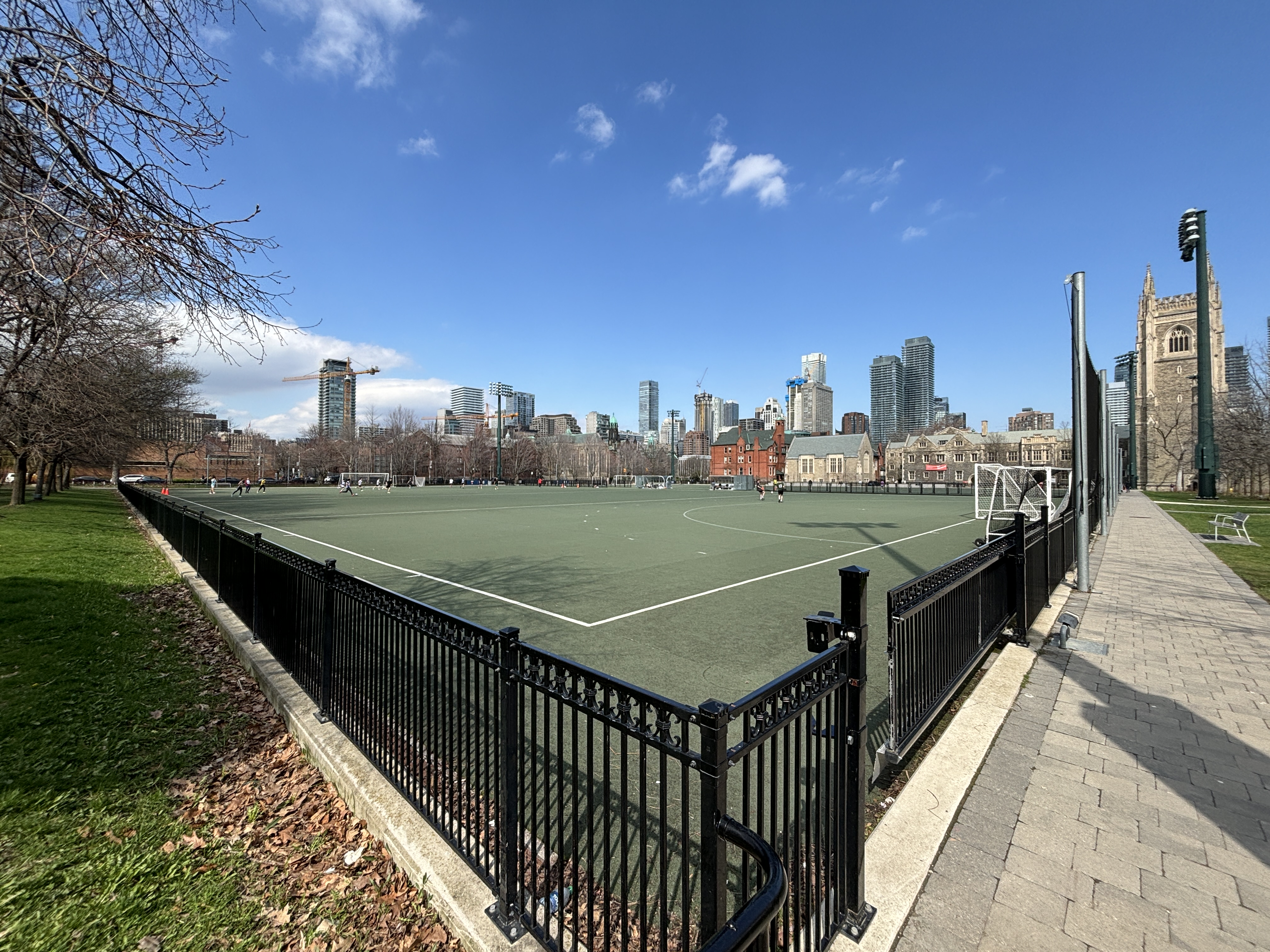
The Back Campus Fields in 2024

Re-construction of the fields began in July 2013 and was completed in 2014, one year before the games were scheduled to start. The complex was built on the existing back campus grass rugby pitch between University College and Hoskin Avenue.

The facility consists of two International Hockey Federation (FIH) Global Class 1 fields; one being used for practices and warm-ups during the games while the other was used for competition matches. Temporary seating for 2,000 spectators was also installed for the games.

The facility cost $9.5 million, which includes $6.25 million to build and finance the project. "The remainder comprises capital expenditures for equipment, transaction fees, project management and other ancillary costs".

== Major competitions hosted ==
Year	Event	Level
2014	CIS Women’s Field Hockey Championship	National
2015	2015 Pan American Games	International
2015	2015 Parapan American Games	International
2015	OUA Field Hockey Championship	Provincial
2016	Men's Pan American Junior Championship	International
2016	CIS Women’s Field Hockey Championship	National
2018	Field Hockey Canada National Championships	National

== See also ==
- Venues of the 2015 Pan American and Parapan American Games
