= Agustina Albertario =

Argentine field hockey player (born 1993)

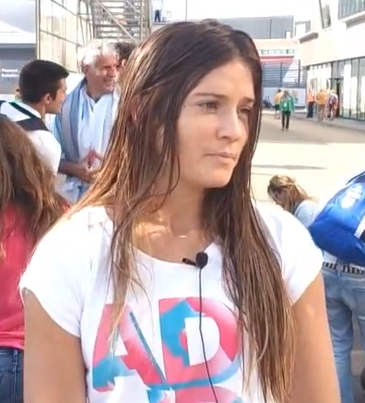
- Albertario in 2014

Personal information
- Born: 1 January 1993 (age 33) Adrogué, Argentina
- Height: 1.73 m (5 ft 8 in)
- Weight: 65 kg (143 lb)

Sport
- Sport: Field hockey
- Position: Forward
- Club: Lomas
Senior career
Years	Team	Caps	Goals
–2016	Lomas	-	-
2016–2017	Leuven	-	-
2017–	Lomas	-	-
2021–	Léopold	-	-
National team
Years	Team	Caps	Goals
2009–2010	Argentina U17		-
2011–2013	Argentina U21		-
2011–	Argentina	166	-
Medal record
Women's field hockey
Representing Argentina
Olympic Games
Silver medal – second place	2020 Tokyo	Team
Bronze medal – third place	2024 Paris	Team
World Cup
Silver medal – second place	2022 Terrassa/Amstelveen
Bronze medal – third place	2014 The Hague
World League
Gold medal – first place	2014-15 Rosario
Pan American Games
Gold medal – first place	2019 Lima	Team
Silver medal – second place	2015 Toronto	Team
Pan American Cup
Gold medal – first place	2013 Mendoza
Gold medal – first place	2022 Santiago
Junior World Cup
Silver medal – second place	2013 Mönchengladbach
Pan American Junior Championship
Gold medal – first place	2012 Guadalajara
Summer Youth Olympics
Silver medal – second place	2010 Singapore	Team

Agustina Albertario (born 1 January 1993) is an Argentine field hockey player. She plays with the Argentina national field hockey team, winning silver medal at the 2020 Summer Olympics.

== Career ==
At the 2013 Pan American Cup she won her first gold medal with the Argentina national field hockey team in an international tournament. Agustina also won the World League 2014–15 and the bronze medal at the 2014 World Cup. She was part of the team that won the gold medal at the 2019 Pan American Games.

She was part of the national squad that won the 2022 Pan American Cup. In 2022 she also won the 2021-22 Hockey Pro League and the silver medal at the 2022 World Cup.

Agustina was chosen to represent all of the Americas at the Santiago 2023 Pan American Games as a member of the new Team Panam Sports.

In 2024, she won the bronze medal with Las Leonas at the 2024 Paris Summer Olympics.
