= Florencia Mutio =

Argentine field hockey player (born 1984)

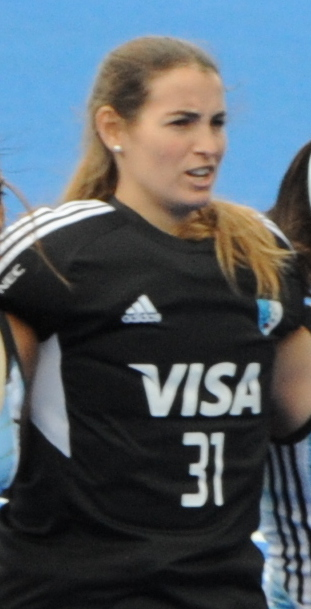
- Mutio in 2016

Personal information
- Full name: María Florencia Mutio
- Born: 20 November 1984 (age 41) Paraná, Argentina
- Height: 1.71 m (5 ft 7 in)
- Weight: 68 kg (150 lb)

Sport
- Sport: Field hockey
- Position: Goalkeeper
- Club: San Fernando
Youth career
- Team
- –: Estudiantes de Paraná
Senior career
Years	Team	Caps	Goals
–2009	Atlético del Rosario	-	-
2010–2011	Unión Deportiva Taburiente	-	-
2011	CUS Catania	-	-
2012–	San Fernando	-	-
National team
Years	Team	Caps	Goals
2004–2005	Argentina U21		-
2012–	Argentina	64	-
Medal record
Summer Olympics
Silver medal – second place	2012 London	Team
World Cup
Bronze medal – third place	2014 The Hague
Champions Trophy
Gold medal – first place	2016 London
Bronze medal – third place	2018 Changzhou
Pan American Games
Silver medal – second place	2015 Toronto	Team
Pan American Cup
Gold medal – first place	2013 Mendoza
Gold medal – first place	2017 Lancaster

María Florencia Mutio (born 20 November 1984) is an Argentine field hockey player. At the 2012 Summer Olympics, she competed for the Argentina field hockey team where the team achieved the silver medal. Florencia also won one Champions Trophy, the bronze medal at the 2014 World Cup and two Pan American Cups.
