= Pilar Romang =

Argentine field hockey player

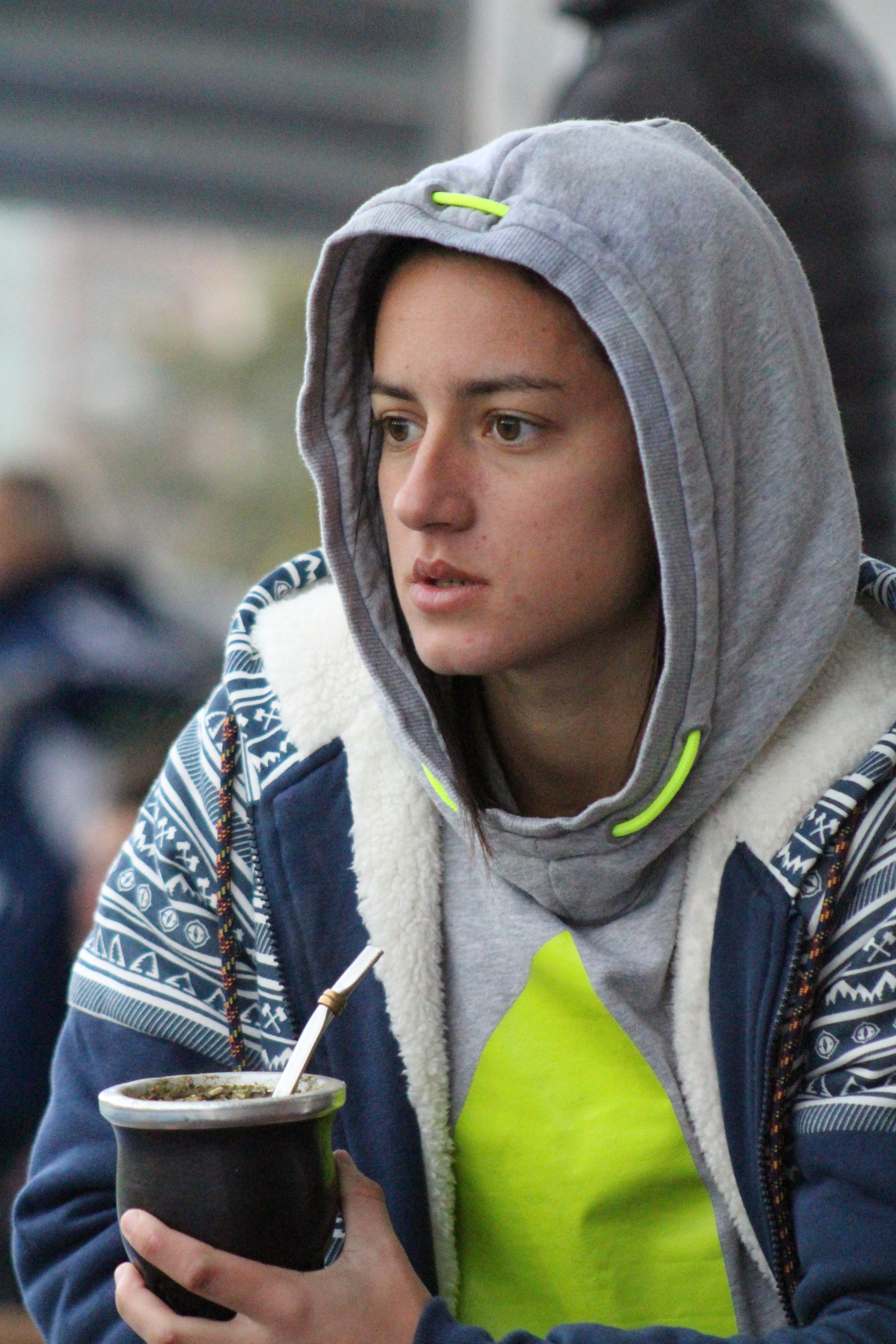

Personal information
- Full name: María del Pilar Romang
- Born: 9 July 1992 (age 34) Buenos Aires, Argentina

Sport
- Sport: Field hockey
- Position: Midfielder/Forward
- Club: SV Kampong
Senior career
Years	Team	Caps	Goals
???–2016	Ciudad	-	-
2016–2019	HC Bloemendaal	-	-
2020–	SV Kampong	-	-
National team
Years	Team	Caps	Goals
2013–2016	Argentina	89	-
Medal record
Women's Field hockey
Representing Argentina
World League
Gold medal – first place	2014–15 Rosario	Team
Champions Trophy
Gold medal – first place	2014 Mendoza	Team
Gold medal – first place	2016 London	Team
Pan American Games
Silver medal – second place	2015 Toronto	Team
Junior World Cup
Silver medal – second place	2013 Mönchengladbach	Team
Pan American Junior Championship
Gold medal – first place	2012 Guadalajara	Team
- Updated on 8 December 2017

María del Pilar Romang (born 9 July 1992) is an Argentine field hockey player. At the 2014 Champions Trophy she won her first gold medal with the Argentina national team in an international tournament. Pilar also won the 2014–2015 World League and the 2016 Champions Trophy.
