= Agustina Habif =

Argentine field hockey player (born 1992)

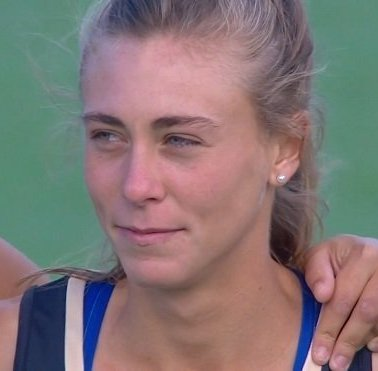

Personal information
- Full name: Agustina Paula Habif
- Born: 8 March 1992 (age 34) Buenos Aires, Argentina
- Height: 1.68 m (5 ft 6 in)
- Weight: 53 kg (117 lb)

Sport
- Sport: Field hockey
- Position: Defender
- Club: GEBA
National team
Years	Team	Caps	Goals
2014–	Argentina	133	-
Medal record
World League
Gold medal – first place	2014-15 Rosario
Champions Trophy
Gold medal – first place	2014 Mendoza
Gold medal – first place	2016 London
Bronze medal – third place	2018 Changzhou
Pan American Games
Silver medal – second place	2015 Toronto	Team
Pan American Cup
Gold medal – first place	2017 Lancaster
Junior World Cup
Silver medal – second place	2013 Mönchengladbach

Agustina Paula Habif (born 8 March 1992) is an Argentine field hockey player. At the 2014 Champions Trophy she won her first gold medal with the Argentina national team in an international tournament. Agustina also won the 2014–2015 World League and the 2016 Champions Trophy.
