= Natalie Sourisseau =

Canadian field hockey player

Personal information
- Born: 5 December 1992 (age 33) Kelowna, British Columbia, Canada

Sport
- Sport: Field hockey
National team
Years	Team	Caps	Goals
2011–	Canada		-
Medal record
Women's field hockey
Representing Canada
Pan American Games
Silver medal – second place	2019 Lima	Team
Bronze medal – third place	2015 Toronto	Team
Pan American Cup
Bronze medal – third place	2013 Mendoza
Bronze medal – third place	2022 Santiago

Natalie Sourisseau (born 5 December 1992) is a Canadian field hockey player.

Sourisseau made her debut for the national team in 2011.

She represented Canada at the 2011 Pan American Games where the team came fourth, the 2015 Pan American Games where they won a bronze medal and at the 2019 Pan American Games where they won a silver medal. She competed at the 2013 Women's Pan American Cup where the team won another bronze medal.

She also competed in the 2018 Commonwealth Games where the Canadian team came in 5th place.
