= Paula Ortiz (field hockey) =

Argentine field hockey player

Personal information
- Full name: María Paula Ortiz
- Born: 16 April 1997 (age 29) Pablo Podestá, Argentina
- Height: 1.66 m (5 ft 5 in)
- Weight: 53 kg (117 lb)

Sport
- Sport: Field hockey
- Position: Defender/Midfielder
- Club: Taburiente
Senior career
| Years | Team | Caps | Goals |
| – | San Martín | - | - |
| 2020– | Taburiente | - | - |
National team
| Years | Team | Caps | Goals |
| 2015– | Argentina | 106 | (15) |
Medal record
World Cup
| Gold medal – first place | 2026 Wavre/Amstelveen |
Champions Trophy
| Bronze medal – third place | 2018 Changzhou |
Pan American Games
| Silver medal – second place | 2015 Toronto | Team |
Pan American Cup
| Gold medal – first place | 2017 Lancaster |
| Gold medal – first place | 2025 Montevideo |
Junior World Cup
| Gold medal – first place | 2016 Santiago |
Youth Olympic Games
| Bronze medal – third place | 2014 Nanjing | Team |

María Paula Ortiz (born 16 April 1997) is an Argentine field hockey player and part of the Argentina national team.

== Awards ==
- Young Player of the Tournament in 2017 Women's Pan American Cup.
