= Danielle Hennig =

Canadian field hockey player

Personal information
- Born: December 23, 1990 (age 35) Kelowna, British Columbia
- Height: 1.71 m (5 ft 7 1/2 in)

Sport
- Country: Canada
- Sport: Field hockey
Medal record
Women's field hockey
Representing Canada
Pan American Games
| Silver medal – second place | 2019 Lima | Team |
| Bronze medal – third place | 2015 Toronto | Team |

Danielle Hennig (born December 23, 1990, in Kelowna, British Columbia) is a female field hockey player, who played for the Canada national field hockey team as a defender at the 2011 Pan American Games, 2013 Women's Pan American Cup, and 2014 Commonwealth Games, and the 2015 Pan American Games, 2018 Commonwealth games, and 2019 Pan American games where the team won a historic silver medal. After just narrowly missing out on qualifying for the 2020 Olympics, Danielle retired in December 2021, at the time being the second highest capped female player ever for Canada having played 200 official international matches over her career.
