= Macarena Rodríguez =

Argentine field hockey player (born 1978)

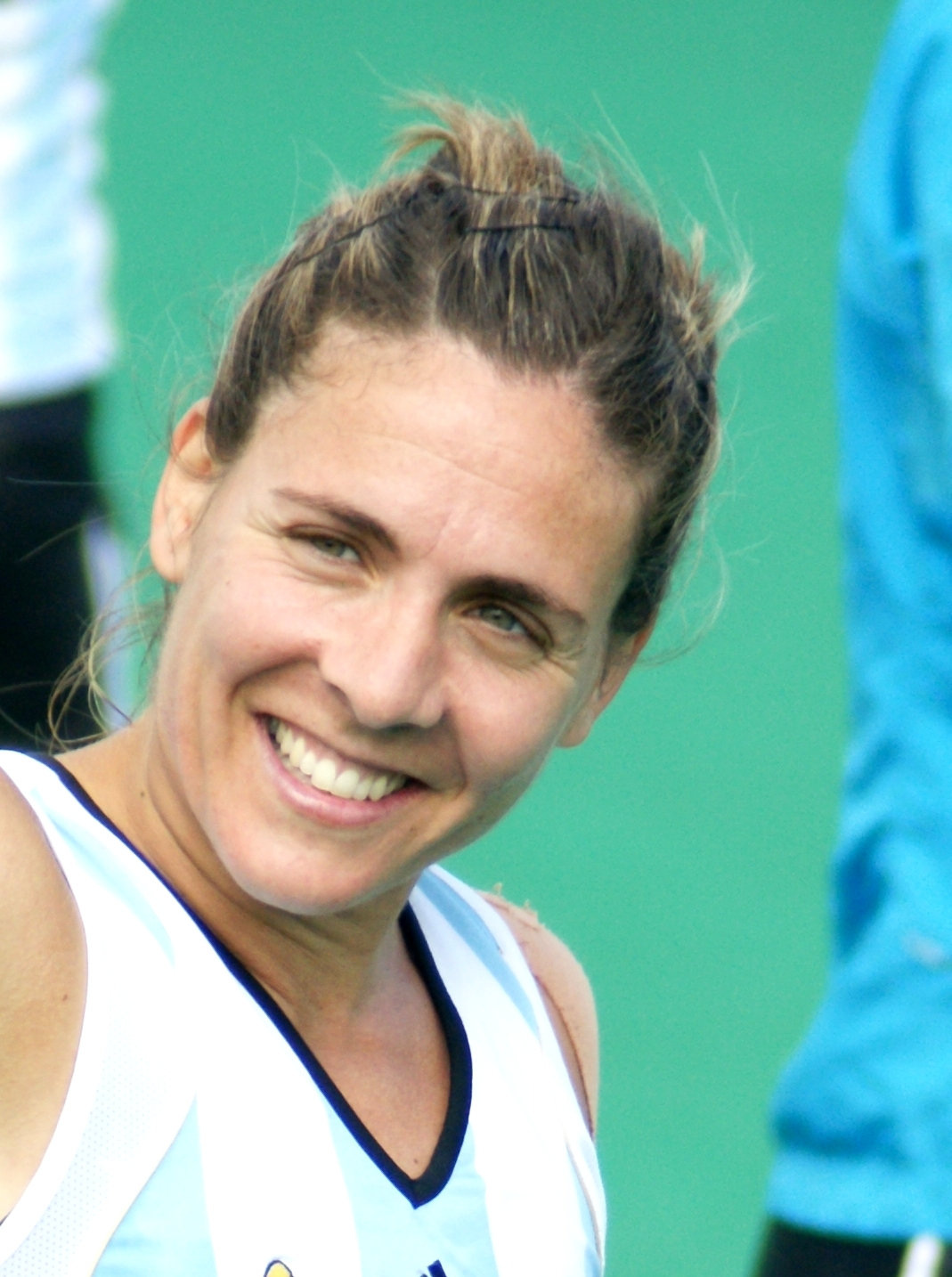

Personal information
- Full name: Ana Macarena Rodríguez Pérez
- Born: June 10, 1978 (age 48) Mendoza, Argentina
- Height: 1.55 m (5 ft 1 in)

Sport
- Sport: Field hockey
- Position: Defender
- Club: River Plate
Senior career
Years	Team	Caps	Goals
???–2012	Andino	-	-
2012–Present	River Plate	-	-
National team
Years	Team	Caps	Goals
2001–2015	Argentina	203	(3)
Medal record
Women's Field hockey
Representing Argentina
Summer Olympics
Silver medal – second place	2012 London	Team
World Cup
Gold medal – first place	2010 Rosario	Team
Bronze medal – third place	2014 The Hague	Team
Champions Trophy
Gold medal – first place	2010 Nottingham	Team
Gold medal – first place	2012 Rosario	Team
Gold medal – first place	2014 Mendoza	Team
Silver medal – second place	2011 Amstelveen	Team
Pan American Games
Silver medal – second place	2011 Guadalajara	Team
Silver medal – second place	2015 Toronto	Team
Pan American Cup
Gold medal – first place	2004 Bridgetown	Team
Gold medal – first place	2013 Mendoza	Team

Ana Macarena Rodríguez Pérez (born 10 June 1978 in Mendoza, Argentina) is an Argentine field hockey player. She competed for the Argentina national field hockey team for the first time in counted matches during Sergio Vigil's coaching years, but returned to the team with Carlos Retegui in 2010, winning the 2010 World Cup and the silver medal at the 2012 Summer Olympics. Macarena also won three Champions Trophy (2010, 2012 and 2014) and two Pan American Cups.

In 2014, Macarena was chosen as the new team's captain as soon as Santiago Capurro started as coach, succeeding 8-time FIH Player of the Year winner Luciana Aymar, who decided to retire after the 2014 Women's Hockey Champions Trophy.
