= Luciana Molina =

Argentine field hockey player

Luciana Ángeles Molina
Personal information
- Born: 20 September 1994 (age 31) Mendoza, Argentina
- Height: 168 cm (5 ft 6 in)
- Weight: 55 kg (121 lb)

Sport
- Sport: Field hockey
- Position: Forward
- Club: River Plate
National team
Years	Team	Caps	Goals
2015	Argentina	36	-
2025-Present	Spain	0	-
Medal record
Women's field hockey
Representing Argentina
Pan American Games
Silver medal – second place	2015 Toronto	Team
EuroHockey Championship
Bronze medal – third place	2025 Mönchengladbach
Junior World Cup
Silver medal – second place	2013 Mönchengladbach

Luciana Ángeles Molina (born 20 September 1994) is a former Argentine field hockey player and currently playing for Spain.

== Hockey career ==
Molina was part of the Argentina Junior National Team at the 2013 Junior World Cup where the team won the silver medal.

In 2015, Molina took part of the team that earned a silver medal at the 2015 Pan American Games.
