= Abigail Raye =

Canadian field hockey player

Personal information
- Born: 17 May 1991 (age 35) Epsom, England

Sport
- Sport: Field hockey
National team
Years	Team	Caps	Goals
–	Canada	155	-
2019–present	Belgium	26	(4)
Medal record
Women's field hockey
Representing Canada
Pan American Games
Bronze medal – third place	2015 Toronto
Pan American Cup
Bronze medal – third place	2013 Mendoza
Representing Belgium
European Championship
Silver medal – second place	2023 Mönchengladbach
Bronze medal – third place	2021 Amstelveen

Abigail Raye (born 17 May 1991) is a British-born Belgian field hockey player. She has represented Canada and Belgium at international level.

== Career ==
Raye won bronze medals at the 2013 Women's Pan American Cup and at the 2015 Pan American Games. She also participated at the 2009 Women's Pan American Cup, the 2011 Pan American Games, the 2010 and 2014 Commonwealth Games She later moved to Belgium and represented them since the 2019 Women's EuroHockey Nations Championship.

== Personal life ==
Raye became a Canadian citizen in 2009 after emigrating from the United Kingdom in December 2005.
