= Madeline Secco =

Canadian field hockey player

Personal information
- Full name: Madeline Rose Secco
- Born: 15 March 1994 (age 32) Victoria, British Columbia
- Height: 163 cm (5 ft 4 in)
- Weight: 60 kg (132 lb)

Sport
- Sport: Field hockey
- Position: Attacker
National team
Years	Team	Caps	Goals
2011–	Canada	107	-
Medal record
Women's field hockey
Representing Canada
Pan American Games
Silver medal – second place	2019 Lima	Team
Bronze medal – third place	2015 Toronto	Team
Pan American Cup
Bronze medal – third place	2013 Mendoza
Bronze medal – third place	2022 Santiago

Madeline Secco (born 15 March 1994) is a Canadian women's field hockey player.

Secco first represented Canada in 2011, and has become a mainstay in the national team since. She has competed at one Pan American Games and two Pan American Cups, taking home a bronze medal from each.

In 2018, Secco represented Canada at the 2018 Commonwealth Games in Gold Coast, Australia. The Canadian team finished in 5th place, and Secco scored two goals at the tournament.
