= Jackie Briggs (field hockey) =

American field hockey player

Jaclyn Briggs
Personal information
- Born: Jaclyn Kintzer; May 23, 1988 (age 38) Reading, PA, United States
- Height: 5 ft 6 in (168 cm)
- Weight: 140 lb (64 kg)

Sport
- Sport: Field hockey
- Position: Goalkeeper
- Club: High Styx
National team
Years	Team	Caps	Goals
2010–2018	United States	184	(0)
Medal record
Women's field hockey
Pan American Games
Gold medal – first place	2015 Toronto
Pan American Cup
Bronze medal – third place	2017 Lancaster

Jaclyn Briggs (née Kintzer; born May 23, 1988) is an American field hockey player. She was born in Reading, Pennsylvania and graduated from Conrad Weiser High School in 2006. She went on to attend the University of North Carolina where she helped lead the team to two NCAA national championships. Briggs studied studio art with a concentration in painting at UNC. Briggs joined the U.S. National team in 2010. At the 2012 Summer Olympics, she competed for the United States women's national field hockey team in the women's event. Briggs helped Team USA defeat Argentina to win its first Pan American Games gold medal and earn a berth in the 2012 Olympics in London. Briggs was a member of the gold medal Champions Challenge squad and a part of the U.S. squad that stunned the world with a fourth place finish at the 2014 Rabobank Hockey World Cup. Briggs recently competed in the 2016 Rio Summer Olympics. Briggs is currently the assistant field hockey coach at Wake Forest University.

== Personal life ==
Briggs is the daughter of Dean and Roxanne Kintzer, wife of Michael Briggs and has dogs named London & Blue. Jackie's husband Michael played football at the University of North Carolina. Jackie currently beasts workouts at Orangetheory Fitness West Cary, NC for fun.
