= Shanlee Johnston =

Canadian field hockey player (born 1990)

Personal information
- Full name: Shanlee Elizabeth Johnston
- Born: 5 February 1990 (age 36) London, Ontario
- Height: 172 cm (5 ft 8 in)
- Weight: 72 kg (159 lb)

Sport
- Sport: Field hockey
- Position: Defender
National team
Years	Team	Caps	Goals
2012–	Canada	133	(9)
Medal record
Representing Canada
Women's field hockey
Pan American Games
Silver medal – second place	2019 Lima	Team
Bronze medal – third place	2015 Toronto	Team
Pan American Cup
Bronze medal – third place	2013 Mendoza	Team
Bronze medal – third place	2022 Santiago	Team
FIH Hockey Series
Silver medal – second place	2018–19 Valencia	Team

Shanlee Elizabeth Johnston (born 5 February 1990) is a field hockey player from Canada.

== Personal life ==
Shanlee Johnston was born in London, Ontario, and grew up in Vancouver, British Columbia.

She has a younger brother, Gordon, who also plays field hockey for Canada.

== Career ==
=== National team ===
Johnston debuted for the national team in 2012 during a test series against the United States. Later that year she competed in her first international tournament during Round 1 of the FIH World League.

She won her first medal with the team in 2013, taking home bronze at the Pan American Cup in Mendoza.

In 2018 Johnston was a member of the national team at the XXI Commonwealth Games in the Gold Coast.

Johnston has also medalled twice at the Pan American Games, winning bronze and silver at the 2015 and 2019 editions, respectively. She won her second Pan American Cup medal in 2022, taking home bronze in Santiago.

=== International goals ===
Goal	Date	Location	Opponent	Score	Result	Competition	Ref.
1	12 November 2012	Eddie Hart Savannah, Port of Spain, Trinidad and Tobago	Guyana	9–0	10–0	2012–13 FIH World League	
2	8 April 2017	West Vancouver HC, Vancouver, Canada	Trinidad and Tobago	5–0	8–0	2016–17 FIH World League	
3	5 August 2017	Spooky Nook Sports, Lancaster, United States	Brazil	6–0	9–0	2017 Pan American Cup	
4	13 April 2018	Gold Coast Hockey Centre, Gold Coast, Australia	South Africa	1–0	3–1	XXI Commonwealth Games	
5	7 June 2018	Cancha Hockey Siglo XI, Salamanca, Mexico	Puerto Rico	9–1	18–2	2018–19 FIH Series Open	
6	7 June 2018	Cancha Hockey Siglo XI, Salamanca, Mexico	Puerto Rico	16–2	18–2	2018–19 FIH Series Open	
7	22 June 2018	Düsseldorfer HC, Düsseldorf, Germany	Germany	1–1	1–1	Test Match	
8	18 May 2019	Glasgow National Hockey Centre, Glasgow, Scotland	Scotland	3–1	4–1	Test Match	
8	24 May 2019	La Gantoise HC, Ghent, Belgium	France	4–0	6–0	Test Match	
