= Stephanie Norlander =

Canadian field hockey player

Personal information
- Full name: Stephanie Emma Norlander
- Born: 20 December 1995 (age 30) North Vancouver, Canada

Sport
- Sport: Field hockey
- Position: Attacker
National team
Years	Team	Caps	Goals
2012–	Canada	79	-
Medal record
Women's field hockey
Representing Canada
Pan American Games
Silver medal – second place	2019 Lima	Team
Bronze medal – third place	2015 Toronto	Team
Pan American Cup
Bronze medal – third place	2013 Mendoza	Team

Stephanie Emma Norlander (born 22 December 1995) is field hockey player from Canada. Norlander plays as a striker in the Canada national team. Norlander made her international debut as a teenager in 2012.

== Playing career ==
=== Senior National Team ===
In 2013, Norlander was a member of the Canada squad at the 2013 Pan American Cup in Mendoza, Argentina, where the team won bronze. Norlander also scored her first international goal at the tournament, in a match against Guyana.

Norlander was a member of the bronze medal-winning Canada team at the 2015 Pan American Games. This was Canada's first medal in the event since 1999. She was also a member of the team at the 2019 Pan American Games where they won a silver medal.

=== Junior National Team ===
Norlander has also represented Canada's junior national team, including at the 2013 Junior World Cup in Mönchengladbach, Germany, where the team finished in fourteenth place.
