= Sara McManus (field hockey) =

Canadian field hockey player

Personal information
- Born: 14 August 1993 (age 32) Tsawwassen, British Columbia, Canada
- Height: 168 cm (5 ft 6 in)
- Weight: 63 kg (139 lb)

Sport
- Sport: Field hockey
- Position: Defender
National team
Years	Team	Caps	Goals
2011–	Canada	206	(65)
2012–2013	Canada U–21	12	(0)
Medal record
Representing Canada
Women's field hockey
Pan American Games
Silver medal – second place	2019 Lima	Team
Bronze medal – third place	2015 Toronto	Team
Pan American Cup
Bronze medal – third place	2013 Mendoza	Team
Bronze medal – third place	2022 Santiago	Team
FIH Hockey Series
Silver medal – second place	2018–19 Valencia	Team
Pan American Junior Championship
Silver medal – second place	2012 Guadalajara	Team

Sara McManus (born 14 August 1993) is a Canadian field hockey player.

== Personal life ==
Sara McManus was born and raised in Tsawwassen, British Columbia. She studied kinesiology at the University of British Columbia.

McManus is sponsored by Ritual Hockey.

== Career ==
=== Under–21 ===
McManus made her debut for the Canada U–21 in 2012 at the Pan American Junior Championship in Guadalajara.

In 2013, she captained the team at the FIH Junior World Cup in Mönchengladbach.

=== National team ===
McManus made her debut for the national team in 2011.

Throughout her career, McManus has medalled multiple times. She won bronze and silver medals at the 2015 and 2019 editions of the Pan American Games, respectively. She has also won bronze twice at the 2013 and 2022 Pan American Cups.

She also represented Canada at the XX and XXI Commonwealth Games.

When she retired, with 216 international appearances under her belt, McManus was the second most capped woman in Canadian hockey history.
