= Hannah Haughn =

Canadian field hockey player

Personal information
- Full name: Hannah Lynn Haughn
- Born: September 4, 1994 (age 31) Vancouver, British Columbia
- Height: 1.56 m (5 ft 1 1/2 in)
- Weight: 49 kg (108 lb)

Sport
- Country: Canada
- Sport: Field hockey
Medal record
Women's field hockey
Representing Canada
Pan American Games
Silver medal – second place	2019 Lima	Team
Bronze medal – third place	2015 Toronto	Team

Hannah Lynn Haughn (born September 4, 1994, in Vancouver, British Columbia) is a female field hockey player, who played for the Canada national field hockey team as a midfielder at the 2014 Commonwealth Games.

Haughn represented Canada at the 2015 Pan American Games where the team won a bronze medal. She was also a member of the silver medal-winning Canadian team at the 2019 Pan American Games.
