= Melissa González (field hockey) =

American field hockey player (born 1989)

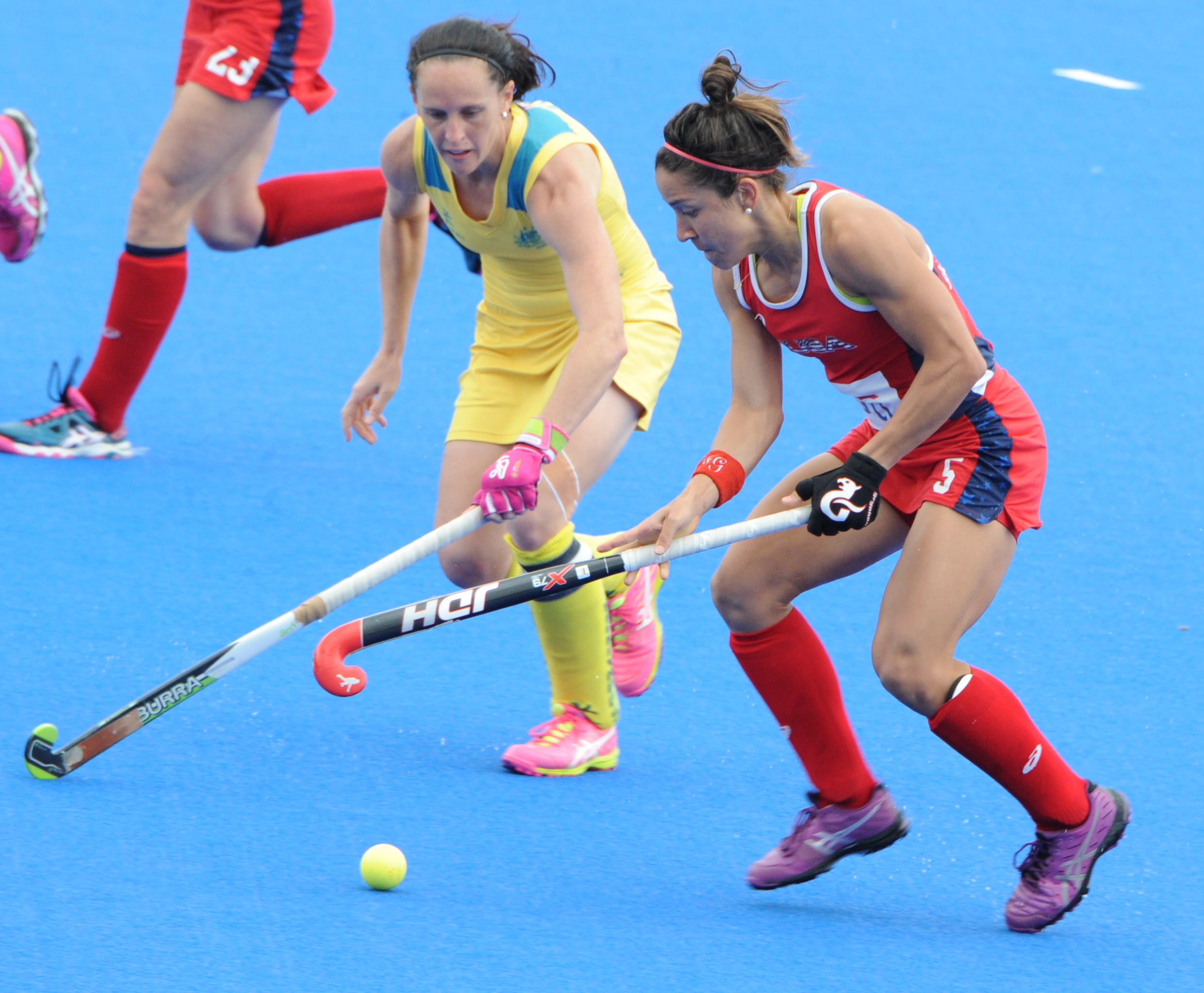
- González in 2016

Personal information
- Born: January 24, 1989 (age 37) Cortlandt, New York, United States
- Height: 5 ft 3 in (160 cm)
- Weight: 128 lb (58 kg)

Sport
- Sport: Field hockey
- Position: Midfielder
Senior career
Years	Team	Caps	Goals
–	Connecticut Huskies	-	-
National team
Years	Team	Caps	Goals
2008–2018	United States	234	-
Medal record
Women's field hockey
Representing the United States
Pan American Games
Gold medal – first place	2011 Guadalajara	Team
Gold medal – first place	2015 Toronto	Team
Pan American Cup
Bronze medal – third place	2017 Lancaster
Champions Trophy
Bronze medal – third place	2016 London

Melissa González (born January 24, 1989) is an American field hockey player. At the 2012 and 2016 Summer Olympics, she competed for the national team. She was born in Peekskill, New York. She attended Lakeland High School. González completed her collegiate field hockey career at the University of Connecticut. She gained multiple awards during her collegiate career including First Team All-American and Big East Conference Defensive Player of the Year. González has competed in World Championship games since 2014. She was named Best Player of the Tournament at the 2017 World League Semifinals in Johannesburg, South Africa. González's Olympic experience includes the 2012 Olympic Games in London, England, and the 2016 Olympic Games in Rio de Janeiro, Brazil. In addition to playing, she has been a volunteer assistant coach at UConn, Yale and the University of Massachusetts.
