= Thea Culley =

Canadian field hockey player (born 1986)

Personal information
- Born: January 2, 1986 (age 40) Trail, British Columbia, Canada
- Height: 1.68 m (5 ft 6 in)
- Weight: 63 kg (139 lb)

Sport
- Country: Canada
- Sport: Field hockey
Medal record
Women's field hockey
Representing Canada
Pan American Games
Bronze medal – third place	2015 Toronto	Team

Thea Culley (born January 2, 1986, in Trail, British Columbia) is a female field hockey player, who played for the Canada national field hockey team as a forward at the 2014 Commonwealth Games.

Culley represented Canada at the 2015 Pan American Games where the team won a bronze medal.
