= Brienne Stairs =

Canadian field hockey player

Personal information
- Full name: Brienne Stairs
- Born: 22 December 1989 (age 36) Kitchener, Ontario
- Height: 170 cm (5 ft 7 in)
- Weight: 62 kg (137 lb)

Sport
- Sport: Field hockey
- Position: Attacker
National team
Years	Team	Caps	Goals
2011–	Canada	175	-
Medal record
Women's field hockey
Representing Canada
Pan American Games
Silver medal – second place	2019 Lima	Team
Bronze medal – third place	2015 Toronto	Team
Pan American Cup
Bronze medal – third place	2013 Mendoza
Bronze medal – third place	2022 Santiago

Brienne Stairs (born 22 December 1989) is a Canadian women's field hockey player.

Stairs first represented Canada in 2011, and has become a mainstay in the national team since. She has competed at two Pan American Games and two Pan American Cup's taking home a bronze medal from each.

Following the 2017 Pan American Cup, Stairs was named in the 2017 Pan American Elite Team by the Pan American Hockey Federation.
