= Paige Selenski =

American field hockey player (born 1990)

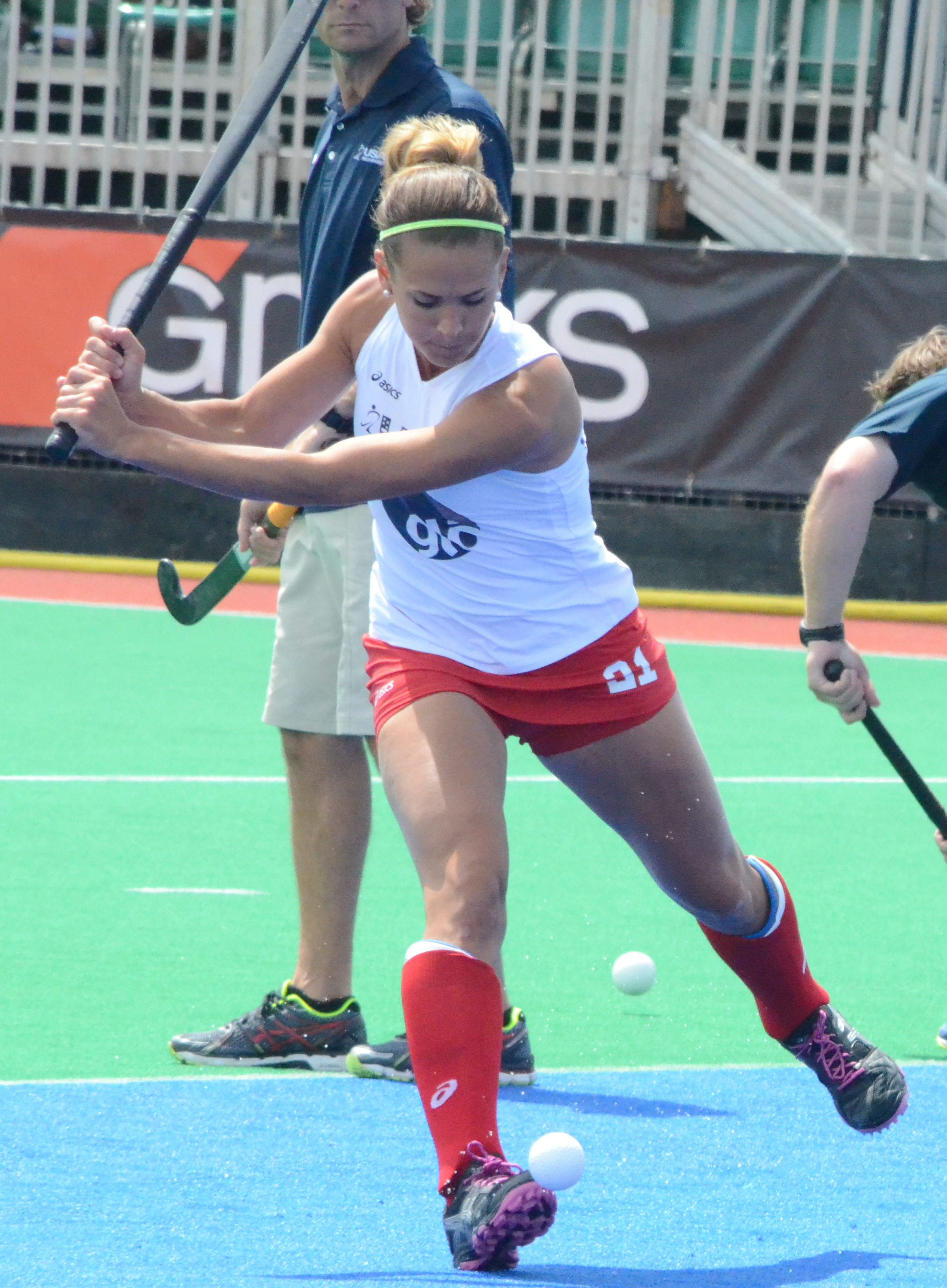
- Selenski in 2013

Personal information
- Born: Paige Selenski; 30 June 1990 (age 36) Kingston, Pennsylvania, U.S.
- Height: 1.70 m (5 ft 7 in)
- Weight: 64 kg (141 lb)

Sport
- Sport: Field hockey
- Position: Forward
National team
Years	Team	Caps	Goals
2010–2016	USA	142	-
Medal record
Women's field hockey
Representing United States
Pan American Games
Gold medal – first place	2011 Guadalajara	Team
Gold medal – first place	2015 Toronto	Team

Paige Selenski-Stem (born 30 June 1990) is an American former field hockey player. At the 2012 Summer Olympics, she competed for the United States women's national field hockey team in the women's event.

Selenski was born in Kingston, Pennsylvania. She graduated from Dallas High School in Dallas, Pennsylvania in 2008 and went on to attend the University of Virginia where she majored in English. In 2015, she appeared nude at ESPN's The Body Issue magazine.

She is married to surgeon Jonathan Stem and she gave birth to a son in 2025.
