= Michelle Vittese =

American field hockey player (born 1989)

Personal information
- Born: December 6, 1989 (age 36) Camden, NJ, United States
- Height: 5 ft 3 in (160 cm)
- Weight: 126 lb (57 kg)

Sport
- Sport: Field hockey
- Position: Midfielder
- Club: Spirit of USA
National team
Years	Team	Caps	Goals
2011–	United States	211	-
Medal record
Women's field hockey
Representing the United States
Pan American Games
Gold medal – first place	2011 Guadalajara	Team
Pan American Cup
Bronze medal – third place	2017 Lancaster

Michelle Vittese (born December 6, 1989) is an American field hockey player. At the 2012 and 2016 Summer Olympics, she competed for the United States women's national field hockey team in the women's event. She was born in Philadelphia.

== Background ==
Vittese grew up in Cherry Hill, New Jersey, and graduated from Camden Catholic High School in 2008. She played field hockey for the University of Virginia and graduated with a major in history. In June 2016, she was part of the USA women's national team that finished with a bronze medal at the 2016 Champion's Trophy in London. Vittese led her team to win the bronze medal in the Pan American Cup against Canada in August 2017.
