= Julia Reinprecht =

American field hockey player (born 1991)

Medal record

Women's field hockey

Representing United States

Pan American Games
| Gold medal – first place | 2011 Guadalajara | Team |
| Gold medal – first place | 2015 Toronto | Team |

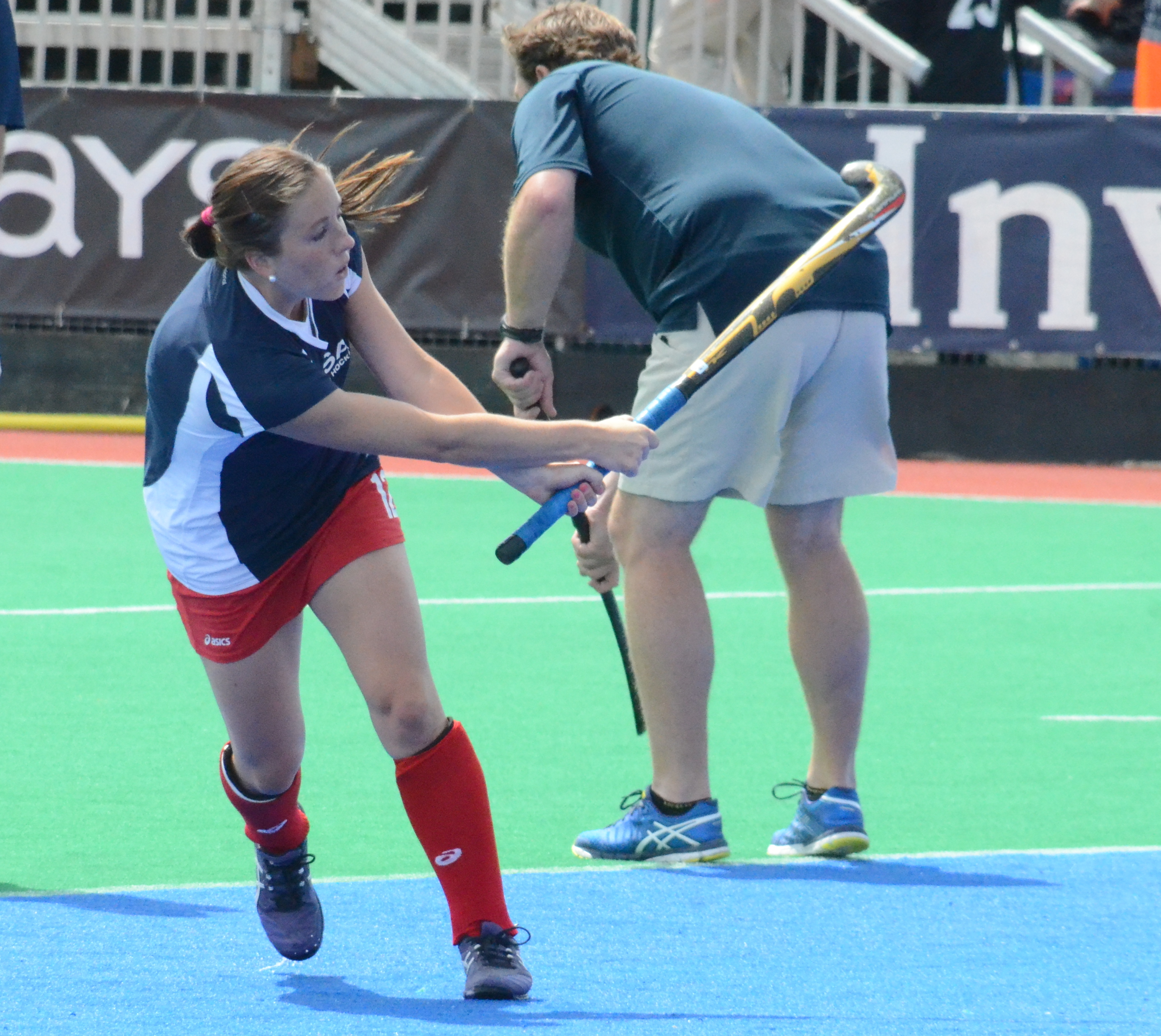

Julia Reinprecht (born July 12, 1991) is an American field hockey player, who plays in defence. At the 2012 and 2016 Summer Olympics, she competed for the United States women's national field hockey team in the women's event. She was also part of the US teams that won gold at the 2011 and 2015 Pan American Games. She retired from the US team in 2016.

== Biography ==
She was born in Philadelphia, and attended Princeton University. In her last college game, Reinprecht broke her skull. Her sister Katie has also represented the USA in field hockey and attended Princeton. They announced their retirement together.

== See also ==
- List of Princeton University Olympians
