= Jill Witmer =

American field hockey player (born 1991)

Personal information
- Born: October 1, 1991 (age 34) Lancaster, United States
- Height: 5 ft 2 in (157 cm)
- Weight: 115 lb (52 kg)

Sport
- Sport: Field hockey
- Position: Forward
- Club: Penn Lanco
2010–2013	Maryland Terrapins	-	-
National team
Years	Team	Caps	Goals
2013–	United States	143	-
Medal record
Pan American Cup
Bronze medal – third place	2017 Lancaster

Jill Witmer (born October 1, 1991) is an American field hockey player. Witmer was named to the U.S. National Team in 2013 and was named to the U.S. Olympic Team in 2016.

== Early life ==
Witmer was born on October 1, 1991, to parents Lew and Judy Witmer. Witmer grew up in Lancaster, Pennsylvania, with four siblings. She began playing field hockey at the urging of her parents. The Witmer family had built a gym for field hockey on their farm, nicknamed "the Coop." Witmer joined her first field hockey team in eighth grade. She then played for the local high school field hockey team Penn Manor even though she was home schooled. The Penn Manor team won the state championship Jill's junior year of high school.

== College player ==
Witmer attended the University of Maryland where she played field hockey from 2010 to 2013. During her time at Maryland, the team won two national titles, in 2010 and 2011. Witmer was personally honored as a four-time NFHCA All-American and the 2013 ACC Player of the year. Witmer is among the highest scorers in the school's history, as of 2016 she is No. 4 in points with 163 and is No. 5 in goals at 67.

== U.S. National Team ==
Witmer was named to the U.S. National Field Hockey team in the summer of 2013 while still a student at University of Maryland. Shortly after signing with the team, Witmer signed a sponsorship deal with STX, a sporting good company that sells field hockey equipment. She was part of the 2016 U.S. National Field Hockey team when the team placed third at the Champion's Trophy in London. She was then named to the U.S. Olympic team for the 2016 Rio de Janeiro Olympic games.
