= Michelle Kasold =

American field hockey player (born 1987)

Medal record

Women's field hockey

Representing United States

Pan American Games
Gold medal – first place	2011 Guadalajara	Team

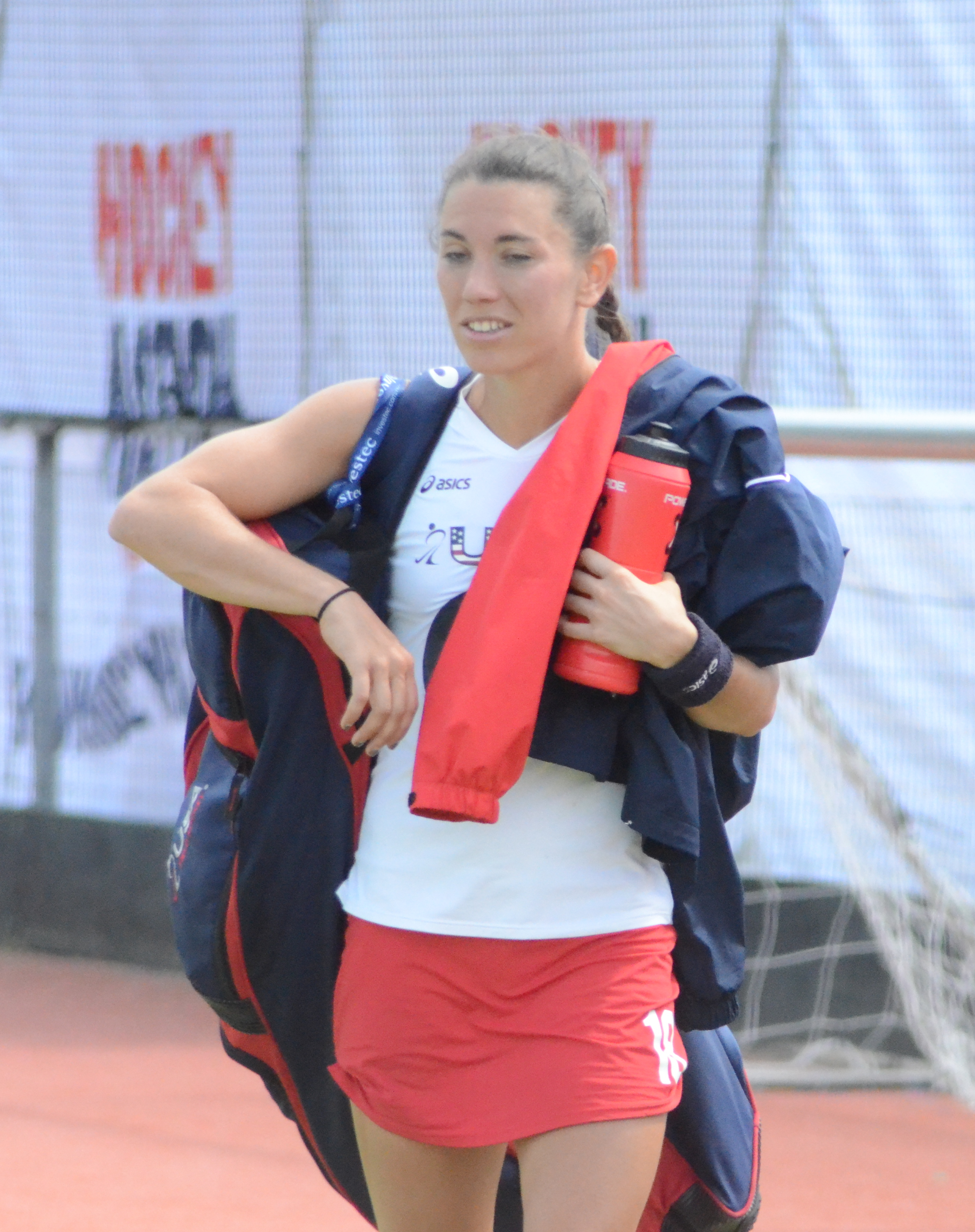

Michelle Kasold (born May 26, 1987) is an American field hockey player. Kasold was on the team that won the field hockey tournament at the 2011 Pan American Games. She also made the U.S. team for the 2012 Summer Olympics.

Kasold was born in San Jose, California. She graduated from East Chapel Hill High School in 2005 and Wake Forest University in 2009.
