= Kelsey Kolojejchick =

American field hockey player

Personal information
- National team: United States
- Born: October 2, 1991 (age 34) Kingston, Pennsylvania
- Education: University of North Carolina

Sport
- Sport: field hockey
- Position: midfield, forward
- Updated on July 30, 2016

Kelsey Kolojejchick (/ˌkoʊləˈdʒeɪtʃɪk/ koh-lə-JAY-chik; born October 2, 1991) is an American field hockey player. In 2016, she was named to the United States Olympic field hockey team for 2016 Olympics in Rio de Janeiro.

== Early life ==
Kolojejchick was on October 2, 1991, in Kingston, Pennsylvania. She grew up in Larksville, Pennsylvania. As a child, Kolojejchick played soccer and took up field hockey at the suggestion of a soccer teammate's parent. She attended Wyoming Seminary high school with future United States National Field Hockey teammate Kathleen Sharkey. Throughout high school, Kolojejchick was a standout athlete, playing soccer, softball, gymnastics, track, swimming, and field hockey. While Kolojejchick was on the Wyoming Seminary field hockey team, the team won two Pennsylvania state championships and were undefeated for an entire season.

== College field hockey player ==
Kolojejchick attended the University of North Carolina (UNC) where she was a midfielder on the school field hockey team. Kolojejchick's older brother, Matt Kolojejchick, transferred to play football at UNC after Kolojejchick helped get his highlight tape in the hands of head coach Butch Davis. The field hockey team reached the national championship finals each year of Kolojejckick's college career, winning the tournament her first year on the team. Kolojejchich was named First Team All-American all four years, a first for a UNC player. She finished her collegiate career in 2012 with 68 career goals and 43 assists.

== United States national field hockey team ==
Kolojejchick was first named to the United States national field hockey team in 2012. On the way to a fourth-place finish for the U.S. team at the 2014 Women's Hockey World Cup, Kolojejchick scored five goals in the tournament.

Prior to 2015, Kolojejchick was primarily a midfielder. Injuries on the U.S. national team prior to the 2015 Pan American Games led to Kolojejchick rotating between forward and midfield positions. The U.S. won the tournament, clinching its place in the 2016 Summer Olympics. Kolojejchick scored seven goals for the team.

On July 1, 2016, Kolojejcick was named to the United States team for the 2016 Olympics.

Kolojejchick played a "key role" in the United States' fifth-place finish, its best in 20 years.
