= Katelyn Falgowski =

American field hockey player

Medal record

Women's field hockey

Representing United States

Pan American Games
| Gold medal – first place | 2011 Guadalajara | Team |

Katelyn Falgowski (born October 23, 1988) is an American field hockey player. She was born in Wilmington, Delaware.

She is a midfielder, and has played more than 200 international games. At the 2008, 2012, and 2016 Summer Olympics, she competed for the United States women's national field hockey team in the women's event.

She was inducted into the Delaware Sports Hall of Fame in 2022.
