= Stefanie Fee =

American field hockey player

Personal information
- Born: March 11, 1990 (age 36) Virginia Beach, United States
- Height: 5 ft 6 in (168 cm)
- Weight: 139 lb (63 kg)

Sport
- Sport: Field hockey
- Position: Defender
- Club: Beach Premier
National team
Years	Team	Caps	Goals
2012–	United States	114	-

Stefanie Fee (born March 11, 1990) is an American field hockey player. She began playing in 2002, at the age of 12. She studied at Duke University and graduated in 2012. Her major was psychology with a double minor in Education and Cultural Anthropology. Her parents are Harry Fee and Charlotte Martz. She participated at the 2018 Women's Hockey World Cup.
