= FIH Hockey World League =

FIH Hockey World League may refer to:

- Men's FIH Hockey World League
- Women's FIH Hockey World League
