= Katie Reinprecht =

American field hockey player (born 1989)

Personal information
- Full name: Katherine Reinprecht
- Born: November 1, 1989 (age 36) Philadelphia, Pennsylvania
- Height: 5 ft 4 in (1.63 m)
- Weight: 123 lb (56 kg)

Sport
- Sport: Field hockey
- Position: Midfield
Youth career
- Years: Team
- 2009–2012: Princeton Tigers
Senior career
| Years | Team | Caps | Goals |
| – | Mystx Field Hockey | - | - |
National team
| Years | Team | Caps | Goals |
| – | United States | | - |
Medal record
Women's field hockey
Representing United States
Pan American Games
| Gold medal – first place | 2011 Guadalajara | Team |

Katherine "Katie" Reinprecht (born November 1, 1989) is an American field hockey player who participated in the 2012 and 2016 Summer Olympics. She competed for the United States women's national field hockey team in the 2012 and 2016 field hockey events.

== Career ==
Reinprecht was born in Philadelphia. She graduated from Mount Saint Joseph Academy high school in 2008 and went on to attend Princeton University. She took a year off from her college education to train for the 2012 Summer Olympics. When she returned to school, she helped lead the Tigers to their first-ever NCAA Field Hockey National Championship, and then was awarded the Honda Sports Award for field hockey. Her younger sister, Julia, also played field hockey for Princeton and the 2012 and 2016 U.S. Olympic field hockey teams.

She is currently sponsored by Ritual Hockey.

== Personal life ==
In June 2018, she married her husband, ice hockey player Taylor Fedun.

== See also ==
- List of Princeton University Olympians
