= Field hockey at the 2014 South American Games – Women's tournament =

Women's field hockey at the 2014 South American Games
Tournament details
- Host country: Chile
- City: Santiago
- Dates: 9–16 March
- Teams: 6
- Venue: Prince of Wales Country Club

Final positions
- Champions: Argentina (2nd title)
- Runner-up: Chile
- Third place: Uruguay

Tournament statistics
- Matches played: 18
- Goals scored: 112 (6.22 per match)
- Top scorer(s): (Argentina) Julia Gomes Fantasia (Chile) Camila Caram (8 goals)

The women's field hockey tournament at the 2014 South American Games was the 2nd edition of the field hockey event for women at the South American Games. It was held over an eight-day period beginning on 9 March, and culminating with the medal finals on 16 March. All games were played at the Prince of Wales Country Club in Santiago, Chile.

Argentina won the tournament for the second time after defeating Chile 3–1 in the final. Uruguay finished in third place, defeating Brazil 3–0.

The tournament served as a qualifier for the 2015 Pan American Games in Toronto, Canada.

== Teams ==
Including the host nation, who received an automatic berth, six teams participated in the tournament.

- Argentina
- Brazil
- Chile
- Paraguay
- Uruguay
- Venezuela

== Results ==
All times are local (ART).

=== Preliminary round ===
Pos	Team	Pld	W	D	L	GF	GA	GD	Pts	Qualification
1	Argentina	5	5	0	0	39	1	+38	15	Gold Medal Match
2	Chile (H)	5	4	0	1	25	5	+20	12	Gold Medal Match
3	Uruguay	5	3	0	2	24	9	+15	9	Bronze Medal Match
4	Brazil	5	2	0	3	5	26	−21	6	Bronze Medal Match
5	Venezuela	5	1	0	4	5	30	−25	3	
6	Paraguay	5	0	0	5	4	31	−27	0	

Source: FIH
(H) Hosts

==== Fixtures ====
9 March 2014
10:00

Argentina	14–0	Venezuela
Romang 1'; Dupuy 4', 67'; Gomes Fantasia 6', 13'; Albertario 28', 35', 40', 49'; Cavallero 31', 33', 42', 43', 55'	Report

Umpires:
Beatriz Mongelos (PAR)
Catalina Montesino (CHL)

9 March 2014
12:00

Brazil	0–7	Uruguay
	Report	Vilar 2'; Lamberti 3', 42'; Kliché 7'; Bisignano 23'; Carvalho 24'; Nieto 35+'

Umpires:
Mercedes Sánchez (ARG)
Suzanne Sutton (USA)

9 March 2014
18:00

Chile	8–1	Paraguay
Filipek 2', 35'; Caram 21', 30', 40', 43'; Villagra 20'; Urroz 33'	Report	Cacace 55'

Umpires:
Ayanna McClean (TTO)
Yhonailen Domínguez (VEN)

10 March 2014
16:00

Uruguay	6–0	Venezuela
Lamberti 15', 35'; Coates 38'; Carvalho 57'; Nieto 62'; Vilar 66'	Report

Umpires:
Catalina Montesino (CHL)
Camila Cabargas (CHL)

10 March 2014
18:00

Paraguay	0–8	Argentina
	Report	Romang 9'; Gomes Fantasia 13', 38', 40'; López 18'; Albertario 22'; A. Habif 28'; Cedrés 57'

Umpires:
Suzanne Sutton (USA)
Yhonailen Domínguez (VEN)

10 March 2014
20:00

Chile	5–0	Brazil
Krimerman 43', 67'; Caram 51', 58'; Saieh 54'	Report

Umpires:
María Locatelli (ARG)
Beatriz Mongelos (PAR)

12 March 2014
10:00

Paraguay	1–3	Brazil
Zambrini 45'	Report	Bernadino 19'; Boos 21'; Gelbcke 70'

Umpires:
Yhonailen Domínguez (VEN)
Camila Cabargas (CHL)

12 March 2014
12:00

Argentina	3–1	Uruguay
Gomes Fantasia 11', 34'; F. Habif 41'	Report	Carvalho 44'

Umpires:
Beatriz Mongelos (PAR)
Ayanna McClean (TTO)

12 March 2014
18:00

Venezuela	1–7	Chile
Pargas 23'	Report	Venegas 17'; Filipek 19', 48', 51'; Villalabeitia 45'; Caram 46'; Urroz 69'

Umpires:
Mercedes Sánchez (ARG)
María Locatelli (ARG)

13 March 2014
16:00

Uruguay	9–1	Paraguay
Vilar 3', 52'; Mora 20'; Stanley 24'; Vega 25', 31'; Dall'Orso 44'; Lamberti 49'; Bisignano 61'	Report	Servián 4'

Umpires:
Catalina Montesino (CHL)
Mercedes Sánchez (ARG)

13 March 2014
18:00

Brazil	2–1	Venezuela
Boos 13', 17'	Report	González 64'

Umpires:
Camila Cabargas (CHL)
María Locatelli (ARG)

13 March 2014
20:00

Chile	0–2	Argentina
	Report	Romang 35'; Juárez 40'

Umpires:
Suzanne Sutton (USA)
Ayanna McClean (TTO)

15 March 2014
09:15

Venezuela	3–1	Paraguay
J. Sánchez 52', 54'; Hernández 60'	Report	I. Romero 31'

Umpires:
Catalina Montesino (CHL)
Suzanne Sutton (USA)

15 March 2014
11:15

Argentina	12–0	Brazil
F. Habif 13'; Gomes Fantasia 24'; Dupuy 28', 35', 39', 68'; Ludueña 35'; Juárez 37', 44', 45'; Albertario 55'; Cesanelli 63'	Report

Umpires:
Yhonailen Domínguez (VEN)
Beatriz Mongelos (PAR)

15 March 2014
15:45

Uruguay	1–5	Chile
Mora 33'	Report	Caram 2'; Urroz 9'; Salas 18'; Venegas 30'; Villagra 57'

Umpires:
María Locatelli (ARG)
Mercedes Sánchez (ARG)

=== Classification round ===
==== Fifth place match ====
16 March 2014
11:30

Venezuela	1–2	Paraguay
González 14'	Report	I. Romero 19'; Rodríguez 31'

Umpires:
Mercedes Sánchez (ARG)
Catalina Montesino (CHL)

==== Bronze medal match ====
16 March 2014
13:45

Uruguay	3–0	Brazil
Kliché 55'; Bisignano 58'; Vilar 65'	Report

Umpires:
María Locatelli (ARG)
Beatriz Mongelos (PAR)

==== Gold medal match ====
16 March 2014
18:15

Argentina	3–1	Chile
Barrionuevo 10', 60'; Juárez 40'	Report	Villalabeitia 70'

Umpires:
Suzanne Sutton (USA)
Ayanna McClean (TTO)

== Statistics ==
=== Final standings ===
Pos	Team	Pld	W	D	L	GF	GA	GD	Pts	Qualification
1st place, gold medalist(s)	Argentina	6	6	0	0	42	2	+40	18	Qualified for 2015 Pan American Games
2nd place, silver medalist(s)	Chile (H)	6	4	0	2	26	8	+18	12	Qualified for 2015 Pan American Games
3rd place, bronze medalist(s)	Uruguay	6	4	0	2	27	9	+18	12	
4	Brazil	6	2	0	4	5	29	−24	6	
5	Paraguay	6	1	0	5	6	32	−26	3	
6	Venezuela	6	1	0	5	6	32	−26	3	

Source: FIH
(H) Hosts

=== Goalscorers ===
There were 112 goals scored in 18 matches, for an average of 6.22 goals per match.

8 goals

- (Argentina) Julia Gomes Fantasia
- (Chile) Camila Caram

6 goals

- (Argentina) Agustina Albertario
- (Argentina) Carla Dupuy

5 goals

- (Argentina) Martina Cavallero
- (Argentina) Giselle Juárez
- (Chile) Sofía Filipek
- (Uruguay) Lucía Lamberti
- (Uruguay) Manuela Vilar

3 goals

- (Argentina) Pilar Romang
- (Brazil) Patrícia Boos
- (Chile) Manuela Urroz
- (Uruguay) Karina Bisignano
- (Uruguay) Paula Carvalho

2 goals

- (Argentina) Noel Barrionuevo
- (Argentina) Florencia Habif
- (Chile) Denise Krimerman
- (Chile) Agustina Venegas
- (Chile) Javiera Villagra
- (Chile) Josefa Villalabeitia
- (Paraguay) Ivanna Romero
- (Uruguay) Matilde Kliché
- (Uruguay) Sofía Mora
- (Uruguay) Agustina Nieto
- (Uruguay) Carolina Vega
- (Venezuela) Stéphanie González
- (Venezuela) Johandri Sánchez

1 goal

- (Argentina) Jimena Cedrés
- (Argentina) Sofía Cesanelli
- (Argentina) Agustina Habif
- (Argentina) Ana López
- (Argentina) Gabriela Ludueña
- (Brazil) Laís Bernadino
- (Brazil) Juliana Gelbcke
- (Chile) Paula Saieh
- (Chile) Josefa Salas
- (Paraguay) Carolina Cacace
- (Paraguay) Sara Rodríguez
- (Paraguay) María Servián
- (Paraguay) Gianinna Zambrini
- (Uruguay) Mercedes Coates
- (Uruguay) Kaisuami Dall'Orso
- (Uruguay) Janine Stanley
- (Venezuela) Maholy Hernández
- (Venezuela) Yamileth Pargas

Source: FIH
