= Field hockey at the 2025 Bolivarian Games =

- Venue: Andrés Avelino Cáceres Complex
- Location: Lima, Peru
- Dates: 22–28 November
- Nations: 6

Champions
- Men: Chile
- Women: Chile

The field hockey competition at the 2025 Bolivarian Games, will be the second edition of the event at the Bolivarian Games. It will take place from 22–28 November at the Andrés Avelino Cáceres Complex in Lima, Peru.

== Medal summary ==
=== Medalists ===
Event	Gold	Silver	Bronze
Men	Chile; Agustin Araya; Agustín Amoroso; Sebastian Alarcón; Vicente Goñi; Alexei De Witt; José Maldonado; Kay Gesswein; Juan Amoroso; Jose Hurtado; Vicente Gabilondo; Julián Villanueva; Agustin Valenzuela; Nils Strabucchi; Luis Valenzuela; Álvaro García; José Marchant Cerda	Venezuela; Heliber Lopez; Gilber Aguilar; Dixon Abreu; Anderson Antique; Cristian Vargas; Rafael Salazar; Jesus Salazar; Nelson Alvarez; Andy Adrian; Raudin Simanca; Yanier Velasquez; Elian Jimenez; Cristian Gómez; Yeiver Lopez; Jhonny de la Torre; Simón Carrera	Peru; Diego Santiago Chipana Savero; Renzo Huacchillo; Angelov Contreras; Manuel Barco; Angel Delgado; Darwin Chavez; Gianfranco Curo; Irvin Cekani; Fernando Aldana; Rodrigo Diaz Espinosa; Sebastian Dennison; Daniel Huanca; Jefferson Arcos; Camilo Cotrina; Matias Caceres; Juan Altamirano; Abel Romero
Women	Chile; Fernanda Villagrán; Denise Rojas; Fernanda Flores; Sofía Filipek; Fernanda Arrieta; Manuela Urroz; Beatriz Wirth; Constanza Palma; Consuelo de las Heras; Paula Valdivia; Antonia Saez; Constanza Muñoz; Valentina Pérez; Antonia Orchard; Maria-Emilia Miranda; María Valenzuela	Paraguay; Sofia Caballero; Micaela Gomez; Pamela Benitez; Victoria Penayo; Maria Florentin; Ximena Doldan; Larissa Barreto; Bella Lopez; Valeria Diaz; Paula Pistilli; Astrid Duarte; Vianca Maciel; Abril Sanabria; Mia Barreto; Bianca Lagraña; Agustina Ramos	Venezuela; Deilymar González; Yurami Navas; Mariannys González; Maria Artigas; Luismar Báez; Stephanie Gonzalez; Patricia Mujica; Johandri Sanchez; Abril Marin; Yhorlayni Rojas; Mery Rodriguez; Julie Artigas; Victoria Torres; Maholy Hernandez; Eva Montes; Marioska Peralta

=== Medal table ===
* Host nation (Peru)

Rank	Nation	Gold	Silver	Bronze	Total
1	Chile (CHI)	2	0	0	2
2	Venezuela (VEN)	0	1	1	2
3	Paraguay (PAR)	0	1	0	1
4	Peru (PER)*	0	0	1	1
Totals (4 entries)		2	2	2	6

== Men's tournament ==
Men's field hockey at the 2025 Bolivarian Games
Tournament details
- Dates: 22–28 November
- Teams: 5 (from 1 confederation)
- Venue: Complejo Panamericano de Villa Maria del Triunfo

Final positions
- Champions: Chile (1st title)
- Runner-up: Venezuela
- Third place: Peru

Tournament statistics
- Matches played: 12
- Goals scored: 140 (11.67 per match)
- Top scorer: (Chile) Juan Amoroso (19 goals)

Chile won their first Bolivarian Games gold medal in field hockey by defeating the defending champions Venezuela 6–0 in the final. The hosts Peru won the bronze medal by defeating the Dominican Republic 3–2 in a shoot-out after the match finished 3–3.

=== Participating nations ===
Five nations participated in the men's tournament.

- Bolivia
- Chile
- Dominican Republic
- Peru
- Venezuela

=== Preliminary round ===
==== Standings ====
Pos	Team	Pld	W	D	L	GF	GA	GD	Pts	Qualification
1	Chile	4	4	0	0	54	2	+52	12	Gold medal match
2	Venezuela	4	3	0	1	32	6	+26	9	Gold medal match
3	Dominican Republic	4	2	0	2	31	12	+19	6	Bronze medal match
4	Peru (H)	4	1	0	3	11	11	0	3	Bronze medal match
5	Bolivia	4	0	0	4	0	97	−97	0	

Source: FIH
Rules for classification: 1) points; 2) matches won; 3) goal difference; 4) goals for; 5) head-to-head result; 6) field goals scored.
(H) Hosts

==== Fixtures ====
22 November 2025
10:40

Venezuela	25–0	Bolivia
Velásquez 3', 9', 21'; Vargas 6', 20', 28', 30', 34', 42', 43', 57'; Gómez 8'; Adrian 12', 19', 37', 45', 47', 49'; López 15', 33', 39', 58'; J. Salazar 23'; Álvarez 28'; Jiménez 32'	Report

Umpires:
Pedro Hernández (CHI)
Valentina Grau (CHI)

22 November 2025
14:40

Dominican Republic	1–0	Peru
Mora 57'	Report

Umpires:
Joaquín Morini (ARG)
Pedro Hernández (CHI)

23 November 2025
12:00

Chile	35–0	Bolivia
J. Amoroso 1', 14', 22', 24', 32', 52', 55', 60'; Strabucchi 3', 6', 54'; Hurtado 7', 36', 60'; Gabilondo 10', 39'; Marchant Cerda 12', 13'; García 14'; A. Valenzuela 14', 40'; Alarcón 17', 26', 46', 50'; A. Amoroso 18', 19', 56'; Gesswein 30', 38', 40', 44'; Goñi 50'; De Witt 51'; Maldonado 52'	Report

Umpires:
Claudio Martínez (URU)
Fabian Martínez (PAR)

24 November 2025
11:00

Dominican Republic	2–6	Chile
B. Quezada 51'; García 59'	Report	Marchant Cerda 7'; J. Amoroso 9', 17', 25', 40'; A. Amoroso 58'

Umpires:
Alan Álvarez (PER)
Claudio Martínez (URU)

24 November 2025
15:00

Venezuela	1–0	Peru
Jiménez 58'	Report

Umpires:
Joaquín Morini (ARG)
Pedro Hernández (CHI)

25 November 2025
11:00

Bolivia	0–26	Dominican Republic
	Report	Cabrera 2', 16', 38', 56'; Monción 2', 7', 25', 52', 54'; Mora 6', 15', 32', 37'; Mata 8'; B. Quezada 17', 30', 48', 60'; García 19', 41', 48'; Anton 23'; Domínguez 29', 40', 50'; Emiliano 38'

Umpires:
Eduardo Islas (MEX)
Pedro Hernández (CHI)

25 November 2025
15:00

Venezuela	0–4	Chile
	Report	J. Amoroso 9', 32'; Gabilondo 40'; Maldonado 42'

Umpires:
Fabian Romero (PAR)
Alan Álvarez (PER)

26 November 2025
15:00

Peru	11–0	Bolivia
Curo 5', 9'; Chávez 6'; Cotrina 12'; Barco 13', 29', 52', 57'; Huanca 30', 43'; Díaz Espinosa 35'	Report

Umpires:
Fabian Romero (PAR)
Valentina Grau (CHI)

27 November 2025
11:00

Dominican Republic	2–6	Venezuela
García 12', 60'	Report	Vargas 7', 23'; Adrian 31', 46', 50'; Álvarez 45'

Umpires:
Joaquín Morini (ARG)
Alan Álvarez (PER)

27 November 2025
15:00

Chile	9–0	Peru
Alarcón 1'; Hurtado 2'; Strabucchi 21', 39'; Maldonado 29', 55'; J. Amoroso 48', 60', 60'	Report

Umpires:
Fabian Romero (PAR)
Claudio Martínez (URU)

=== Medal round ===
==== Bronze medal match ====
28 November 2025
11:00

Dominican Republic	3–3	Peru
García 6', 40'; B. Quezada 46'	Report	Cotrina 4'; Huanca 14'; Díaz Espinosa 24'
Penalties
Domínguez (penalty shoot-out scored); Monción (penalty shoot-out scored); García (penalty shoot-out missed); A. Quezada (penalty shoot-out missed); Mora (penalty shoot-out missed)	2–3	(penalty shoot-out missed) Chávez; (penalty shoot-out missed) Aldana; (penalty shoot-out scored) Huanca; (penalty shoot-out scored) Díaz Espinosa; (penalty shoot-out scored) Dennison

Umpires:
Eduardo Islas (MEX)
Pedro Hernández (CHI)

==== Gold medal match ====
28 November 2025
16:00

Chile	6–0	Venezuela
J. Amoroso 7', 32'; Strabucchi 17', 50'; Gesswein 29'; García 58'	Report

Umpires:
Fabian Romero (PAR)
Joaquín Morini (ARG)

=== Final standings ===
1. Chile
2. Venezuela
3. Peru
4. Dominican Republic
5. Bolivia

=== Goalscorers ===
There were 140 goals scored in 12 matches, for an average of 11.7 goals per match.

19 goals

- (Chile) Juan Amoroso

10 goals

- (Venezuela) Cristian Vargas

9 goals

- (Venezuela) Andy Adrian

8 goals

- (Dominican Republic) Francisco García

7 goals

- (Chile) Nils Strabucchi

6 goals

- (Dominican Republic) Bladis Quezada

5 goals

- (Chile) Sebastián Alarcón
- (Chile) Kay Gesswein
- (Dominican Republic) Jeffrey Monción
- (Dominican Republic) Luis Mora

4 goals

- (Chile) Agustín Amoroso
- (Chile) José Hurtado
- (Chile) José Maldonado
- (Dominican Republic) Argeny Cabrera
- (Peru) Manuel Barco
- (Venezuela) Yeiver López

3 goals

- (Chile) Vicente Gabilondo
- (Chile) José Marchant Cerda
- (Dominican Republic) Ramón Domínguez
- (Peru) Daniel Huanca
- (Venezuela) Yanier Velásquez

2 goals

- (Chile) Álvaro García
- (Chile) Agustín Valenzuela
- (Peru) Camilo Cotrina
- (Peru) Gianfranco Curo
- (Peru) Rodrigo Díaz Espinosa
- (Venezuela) Nelson Álvarez
- (Venezuela) Elian Jiménez

1 goal

- (Chile) Vicente Goñi
- (Chile) Alexei de Witt
- (Dominican Republic) Yermi Anton
- (Dominican Republic) Braulin Emiliano
- (Dominican Republic) Yohan Mata
- (Peru) Darwin Chávez
- (Venezuela) Cristian Gómez
- (Venezuela) Jesús Salazar

Source: FIH

== Women's tournament ==
Women's field hockey at the 2025 Bolivarian Games
Tournament details
- Dates: 22–28 November
- Teams: 4 (from 1 confederation)
- Venue: Complejo Panamericano de Villa Maria del Triunfo

Final positions
- Champions: Chile (1st title)
- Runner-up: Paraguay
- Third place: Venezuela

Tournament statistics
- Matches played: 10
- Goals scored: 73 (7.3 per match)
- Top scorer: (Chile) Manuela Urroz (10 goals)

Chile won their first field hockey gold medal at the Bolivarian Games by defeating Paraguay 9–0 in the final. The defending champions Venezuela won the bronze medal by defeating the hosts Peru 5–2.

=== Participating nations ===
Four nations participated in the women's tournament.

- Chile
- Paraguay
- Peru
- Venezuela

=== Preliminary round ===
==== Standings ====
Pos	Team	Pld	W	D	L	GF	GA	GD	Pts	Qualification
1	Chile	3	3	0	0	31	1	+30	9	Semi-finals
2	Paraguay	3	2	0	1	7	10	−3	6	Semi-finals
3	Venezuela	3	1	0	2	6	13	−7	3	Semi-finals
4	Peru (H)	3	0	0	3	2	22	−20	0	Semi-finals

Source: FIH
Rules for classification: 1) points; 2) matches won; 3) goal difference; 4) goals for; 5) head-to-head result; 6) field goals scored.
(H) Hosts

==== Fixtures ====
22 November 2025
10:00

Paraguay	0–7	Chile
	Report	Rojas 3'; Palma 5', 32'; De las Heras 35'; Valdivia 35'; Arrieta 44', 48'

Umpires:
Joaquín Morini (ARG)
Alan Álvarez (PER)

22 November 2025
13:10

Peru	1–3	Venezuela
Ramírez 39'	Report	Rodríguez 25'; S. González 45'; M. González 53'

Umpires:
Alan Álvarez (PER)
Valentina Grau (CHI)

23 November 2025
10:00

Venezuela	2–5	Paraguay
Mujica 20'; Sánchez 54'	Report	M. Barreto 17'; Duarte 35'; Doldán 42', 43'; Maciel 49'

Umpires:
Yailyn Abrahan (CUB)
Valentina Grau (CHI)

23 November 2025
14:00

Peru	0–17	Chile
	Report	Rojas 1'; Valdivia 1', 47'; De las Heras 2'; Villagrán 3', 28', 60'; Arrieta 6', 39', 52', 54'; Muñoz 7'; Urroz 21', 29', 34', 60+'; Palma 50'

Umpires:
Alejandra Pasillas (MEX)
Eduardo Islas (MEX)

25 November 2025
09:00

Chile	7–1	Venezuela
Urroz 8', 14', 56'; Arrieta 9'; Rojas 35'; De las Heras 44'; Villagrán 55'	Report	M. González 50'

Umpires:
Alejandra Pasillas (MEX)
Yailyn Abrahan (CUB)

25 November 2025
13:00

Peru	1–2	Paraguay
Arnau 36'	Report	Doldán 23'; Gómez 60'

Umpires:
Valentina Grau (CHI)
Joaquín Morini (ARG)

=== Medal round ===
==== Bracket ====
Semi-finals
26 November
Chile	8
Peru	0
26 November
Paraguay	2
Venezuela	1

Gold medal
28 November
Chile	9
Paraguay	0
Bronze medal
28 November
Peru	2
Venezuela	5

==== Semi-finals ====
26 November 2025
11:00

Paraguay	2–1	Venezuela
Doldán 34'; L. Barreto 43'	Report	Sánchez 50'

Umpires:
Claudio Martínez (URU)
Alan Álvarez (PER)

26 November 2025
13:00

Chile	8–0	Peru
De las Heras 5', 59'; Filipek 9', 42'; Urroz 15', 29'; Villagrán 22'; Miranda 46'	Report

Umpires:
Eduardo Islas (MEX)
Yailyn Abrahan (CUB)

==== Bronze medal match ====
28 November 2025
08:30

Peru	2–5	Venezuela
Méndez 15'; Cueva 60'	Report	Mujica 6'; Marín 14'; M. González 39', 54'; Rodríguez 53'

Umpires:
Valentia Grau (CHI)
Claudio Martínez (URU)

==== Gold medal match ====
28 November 2025
13:30

Chile	9–0	Paraguay
Arrieta 2', 47'; Filipek 6'; Miranda 16'; Pérez 20'; De las Heras 23', 25'; Villagrán 27'; Urroz 55'	Report

Umpires:
Yailyn Abrahan (CUB)
Alan Álvarez (PER)

=== Final standings ===
1. Chile
2. Paraguay
3. Venezuela
4. Peru

=== Goalscorers ===
There were 73 goals scored in 10 matches, for an average of 7.3 goals per match.

10 goals

- (Chile) Manuela Urroz

9 goals

- (Chile) Fernanda Arrieta

7 goals

- (Chile) Consuelo de las Heras

6 goals

- (Chile) Fernanda Villagrán

4 goals

- (Paraguay) Ximena Doldán
- (Venezuela) Mariannys González

3 goals

- (Chile) Sofía Filipek
- (Chile) Constanza Palma
- (Chile) Denise Rojas
- (Chile) Paula Valdivia

2 goals

- (Chile) María-Emilia Miranda
- (Venezuela) Patricia Mujica
- (Venezuela) Mery Rodríguez
- (Venezuela) Johandri Sánchez

1 goal

- (Chile) Constanza Muñoz
- (Chile) Valentina Pérez
- (Paraguay) Larissa Barreto
- (Paraguay) Mia Barreto
- (Paraguay) Astrid Duarte
- (Paraguay) Micaela Gómez
- (Paraguay) Vianca Maciel
- (Peru) Fabiana Arnau
- (Peru) Nicole Cueva
- (Peru) Camila Méndez
- (Peru) Daniela Ramírez
- (Venezuela) Stephanie González
- (Venezuela) Abril Marín

Source: FIH
