= 2008 Women's Pan-Am Junior Championship =

Women's field hockey tournament in Mexico City, Mexico

Women's Junior Pan-Am Championship

Tournament details
- Host country: Mexico
- City: Mexico City
- Dates: 6–12 October
- Teams: 8 (from 1 confederation)

Final positions
- Champions: United States (1st title)
- Runner-up: Chile
- Third place: Argentina

Tournament statistics
- Matches played: 20
- Goals scored: 139 (6.95 per match)
- Top scorer: (United States) Katie O'Donnell (8 goals)
- Best player: (Chile) Cristine Fingerhuth
- Best goalkeeper: (Chile) Claudia Schüler

The 2008 Women's Junior Pan-Am Championship was the 6th edition of the Women's Pan American Junior Championship. It was held from 6 to 12 October 2008 in Mexico City, Mexico.

The tournament served as a qualifier for the 2009 Women's Hockey Junior World Cup, held in Boston, United States in August 2009.

The United States won the tournament for the 1st time, defeating Chile 2–1 in the final. Argentina won the bronze medal by defeating Mexico 8–0 in the third and fourth place playoff.

== Participating nations ==
A total of eight teams participated in the tournament:

- Argentina
- Barbados
- Bermuda
- Chile
- Mexico
- Trinidad and Tobago
- United States
- Uruguay

== Results ==
=== First round ===
==== Pool A ====
Pos	Team	Pld	W	D	L	GF	GA	GD	Pts	Qualification
1	Argentina	3	3	0	0	16	1	+15	9	Semi-finals
2	Mexico	3	2	0	1	9	5	+4	6	Semi-finals
3	Uruguay	3	1	0	2	6	8	−2	3	
4	Barbados	3	0	0	3	0	17	−17	0	

Source: Panamhockey
Rules for classification: 1) points; 2) goal difference; 3) goals scored; 4) head-to-head result.

6 October 2008
15:00

Argentina	6–0	Barbados
M. Rojas 28'; Kakazu 47'; Bertarini 57'; Campoy 60'; Sánchez Moccia 62'; Y. Rojas 64'	Report

Umpires:
Erica Chambers (JAM)
Claudia Videla (CHL)

6 October 2008
17:30

Uruguay	1–2	Mexico
Sanguinetti 41'	Report	Castillo 26', 44'

Umpires:
Stephanie Judefind (USA)
Claudia Videla (CHL)

7 October 2008
15:30

Barbados	0–4	Uruguay
	Report	Olaso 6'; Olave 22', 46'; De María 67'

Umpires:
Erica Chambers (JAM)
Claudia Videla (CHL)

7 October 2008
17:40

Argentina	4–0	Mexico
Y. Rojas 9', 17'; Zuloaga 14'; Román 69'	Report

Umpires:
Jenille Carrington (TTO)
Stephanie Judefind (USA)

9 October 2008
09:00

Barbados	0–7	Mexico
		Castillo 7', 23', 25'; Navarro 17', 32', 39'; Hernández 18'

Umpires:
Erica Chambers (JAM)
Emma Simmons (BER)

9 October 2008
11:00

Uruguay	1–6	Argentina
Olaso 5'	Report	Zuloaga 3', 19'; Sánchez Moccia 16'; Román 53'; Merino 55', 65'

Umpires:
Stephanie Judefind (USA)
Claudia Videla (CHL)

==== Pool B ====
Pos	Team	Pld	W	D	L	GF	GA	GD	Pts	Qualification
1	United States	3	2	1	0	29	2	+27	7	Semi-finals
2	Chile	3	2	1	0	20	2	+18	7	Semi-finals
3	Trinidad and Tobago	3	1	0	2	11	12	−1	3	
4	Bermuda	3	0	0	3	0	44	−44	0	

Source: Panamhockey
Rules for classification: 1) points; 2) goal difference; 3) goals scored; 4) head-to-head result.

6 October 2008
09:00

Chile	5–1	Trinidad and Tobago
Urroz 5'; Fingerhuth 11', 44'; Villalabeitia 60'; Sclabos 69'	Report	Lewis 47'

Umpires:
Michelle Joubert (RSA)
Maritza Perez (URU)

6 October 2008
11:00

United States	21–0	Bermuda
Drazdowski 1', 10', 44'; O'Donnell 3', 12', 38'; Gonzalez 7', 21'; Cesan 20'; Malmberg 28'; Perrelle 35', 42', 64', 70'; Ghandi 47', 51'; Puffenberger 48', 54'; K. Reinprecht 56'; Pappas 62'; Sharkey 65'	Report

Umpires:
Arely Castellanos (MEX)
Erica Chambers (JAM)

7 October 2008
09:00

Bermuda	0–14	Chile
	Report	Fingerhuth 3', 47', 52'; MacKenna 13'; Greene 15', 19', 32', 46'; Wagner 24'; Caram 31'; Sclabos 34', 53'; Urroz 41'; Cruz 55'

Umpires:
Kim Hoyte (BAR)
Maritza Perez (URU)

7 October 2008
13:30

United States	7–1	Trinidad and Tobago
Drazdowski 25', 32'; Malmberg 36'; Selenski 43', 55', 70'; O'Donnell 52'	Report	Ramchand-Du Quesnay 48'

Umpires:
Irene Presenqui (ARG)
Michelle Joubert (RSA)

9 October 2008
14:30

Bermuda	0–9	Trinidad and Tobago
	Report	James 10', 18', 62'; Lezama 32'; Ellis 35'; Lewis 40'; Ramchand-Du Quesnay 45', 50', 57'

Umpires:
Arely Castellanos (MEX)
Maritza Perez (URU)

9 October 2008
16:30

Chile	1–1	United States
Wagner 28'	Report	Kolojejchick 54'

Umpires:
Michelle Joubert (RSA)
Irene Presenqui (ARG)

=== Second round ===
==== Fifth to eighth place classification ====
Crossover
10 October 2008
Uruguay	13
Bermuda	0
10 October 2008
Trinidad and Tobago	3
Barbados	1

Fifth place
12 October 2008
Uruguay	3
Trinidad and Tobago	2
Seventh place
12 October 2008
Bermuda	0
Barbados	4

===== Crossover =====
10 October 2008
09:00

Uruguay	13–0	Bermuda
Bóca 6', 35'; Mora 7', 18', 36'; Olaso 21', 55'; Coates 22', 25'; Nieto 26', 52'; Zas 33'; Stanley 38'	Report

Umpires:
Kim Hoyte (BAR)
Jenielle Carrington (TTO)

10 October 2008
11:30

Trinidad and Tobago	3–1	Barbados
Lewis 14'; Ramchand-Du Quesnay 49', 55'	Report	King 68'

Umpires:
Emma Simmons (BER)
Arely Castellanos (MEX)

===== Seventh and eighth place =====
12 October 2008
08:00

Bermuda	0–4	Barbados
	Report	King 16'; Oxley 25'; Squires 29'; Alkins 31'

Umpires:
Claudia Videla (CHL)
Arely Castellanos (MEX)

===== Fifth and sixth place =====
12 October 2008
10:30

Uruguay	3–2	Trinidad and Tobago
Olaso 18', 47'; Mora 66'	Report	James 2'; Ramchand-Du Quesnay 60'

Umpires:
Erica Chambers (JAM)
Kim Hoyte (BAR)

==== First to fourth place classification ====
Semi-finals
10 October 2008
Argentina	1
Chile	3
10 October 2008
United States	6
Mexico	1

Final
12 October 2008
Chile	1
United States (a.e.t)	2
Third place
12 October 2008
Argentina	8
Mexico	0

===== Semi-finals =====
10 October 2008
14:00

Argentina	1–3	Chile
M. Rojas 36'	Report	Fingerhuth 19'; Walbaum 48'; Caram 66'

Umpires:
Michelle Joubert (RSA)
Stephanie Judefind (USA)

10 October 2008
16:30

United States	6–1	Mexico
Gonzalez 13'; O'Donnell 17', 27', 56', 59'; Drazdowski 43'	Report	Castillo 1'

Umpires:
Maritza Pérez (URU)
Irene Presenqui (ARG)

===== Third and fourth place =====
12 October 2008
13:00

Argentina	8–0	Mexico
Roman 17'; Zuloaga 27'; Merino 30'; D. Sruoga 66'; Y. Rojas 48'; Bertarini 52'; Del Frari 58'; Villalba 70'	Report

Umpires:
Maritza Pérez (URU)
Emma Simmons (BER)

===== Final =====
12 October 2008
15:30

Chile	1–2 (a.e.t.)	United States
Fingerhuth 26'	Report	Gonzalez 45'; Ghandi 72'

Umpires:
Michelle Joubert (RSA)
Irene Presenqui (ARG)

== Awards ==
Top Goalscorer	Player of the Tournament	Goalkeeper of the Tournament
(United States) Katie O'Donnell	(Chile) Cristine Fingerhuth	(Chile) Claudia Schüler

== Statistics ==
=== Final standings ===
- Note: as the United States qualified for the 2009 Junior World Cup as the host nation, Argentina took the remaining entry quota as the next highest ranked team.

Pos	Team	Pld	W	D	L	GF	GA	GD	Pts	Qualification
1	United States	5	4	1	0	37	4	+33	13	
2	Chile	5	3	1	1	24	5	+19	10	2009 Junior World Cup
3	Argentina	5	4	0	1	25	4	+21	12	2009 Junior World Cup
4	Mexico	5	2	0	3	10	19	−9	6	
5	Uruguay	5	3	0	2	22	10	+12	9	
6	Trinidad and Tobago	5	2	0	3	16	16	0	6	
7	Barbados	5	1	0	4	5	20	−15	3	
8	Bermuda	5	0	0	5	0	61	−61	0	

Source: PanamHockey

=== Goalscorers ===
There were 139 goals scored in 20 matches, for an average of 6.95 goals per match.

8 goals

- (United States) Kathleen O'Donnell

7 goals

- (Chile) Christine Fingerhuth
- (Trinidad and Tobago) Arielle Ramchand-Du Quesnay

6 goals

- (Mexico) Ahidee Castillo
- (United States) Elizabeth Drazdowski
- (Uruguay) Isábel Olaso

4 goals

- (Argentina) Yanina Rojas
- (Argentina) Victoria Zuloaga
- (Chile) Andrea Greene
- (Trinidad and Tobago) Tonya James
- (United States) Melissa González
- (United States) Kaitlyn Perrelle
- (Uruguay) Sofía Mora

3 goals

- (Argentina) Delfina Merino
- (Argentina) Sofía Román
- (Chile) Catalina Sclabos
- (Mexico) Michel Navarro
- (Trinidad and Tobago) Alanna Lewis
- (United States) Camille Ghandi
- (United States) Paige Selenski

2 goals

- (Argentina) Aná Bertarini
- (Argentina) Macarena Rojas
- (Argentina) Rocío Sánchez Moccia
- (Barbados) Cher King
- (Chile) Camila Caram
- (Chile) Manuela Urroz
- (Chile) Cristina Wagner
- (United States) Marta Malmberg
- (United States) Tara Puffenberger
- (Uruguay) Bettina Bóca
- (Uruguay) Mercedes Coates
- (Uruguay) Agustina Nieto
- (Uruguay) Anastásia Olave

1 goal

- (Argentina) Pilar Campoy
- (Argentina) Natalía del Frari
- (Argentina) Yosi Kakazu
- (Argentina) Daniela Sruoga
- (Argentina) Victoria Villalba
- (Barbados) Katrina Alkins
- (Barbados) Shakira Oxley
- (Barbados) Jill-Marie Squires
- (Chile) Valentina Crúz
- (Chile) Javiera MacKenna
- (Chile) Josefa Villalabeitia
- (Chile) Sofía Walbaum
- (Mexico) Alexandra Hernández
- (Trinidad and Tobago) Chemika Ellis
- (Trinidad and Tobago) Terésa Lezama
- (United States) Michelle Cesan
- (United States) Kelsey Kolojejchick
- (United States) Alexis Pappas
- (United States) Katherine Reinprecht
- (United States) Kathleen Sharkey
- (Uruguay) Camila de María
- (Uruguay) Sofía Sanguinetti
- (Uruguay) Janine Stanley
- (Uruguay) Macarena Zas
