= 2010 Women's Indoor Pan American Cup =

International indoor hockey competition

Tournament details
- City: Barquisimeto, Venezuela
- Dates: 9–15 August
- Teams: 8 (from 1 confederation)

Final positions
- Champions: Argentina (2nd title)
- Runner-up: Uruguay
- Third place: United States

Tournament statistics
- Matches played: 18
- Goals scored: 100 (5.56 per match)
- Top scorer(s): (Chile) Karin Gudenschwager (Uruguay) Anastásia Olave (7 goals)
- Best player: (Uruguay) Carolina Mutilva

The 2010 Women's Indoor Pan American Cup was the 5th edition of the Indoor Pan American Cup, an indoor hockey competition. The tournament was held in Barquisimeto, Venezuela, from 9–15 August.

Defending champions Argentina won the tournament for the second time, defeating Uruguay 1–0 in penalties, after the final finished as a 1–1 draw. The United States won the bronze medal after defeating Trinidad and Tobago 2–1.

== Teams ==
The following eight teams competed for the title:

- Argentina
- Canada
- Chile
- Peru
- United States
- Uruguay
- Trinidad and Tobago
- Venezuela

== Results ==
=== Preliminary round ===
==== Pool A ====
Pos	Team	Pld	W	D	L	GF	GA	GD	Pts	Qualification
1	Uruguay	3	3	0	0	19	4	+15	9	Advanced to Semi-Finals
2	Trinidad and Tobago	3	2	0	1	10	9	+1	6	Advanced to Semi-Finals
3	Canada	3	1	0	2	9	8	+1	3	
4	Peru	3	0	0	3	1	18	−17	0	

Source: Pan American Hockey Federation
Rules for classification: 1) points; 2) goal difference; 3) games won; 4) head-to-head result.

9 August 2010
10:05

Canada	4–0	Peru
Buttinger 10', 33'; Woodcroft 21'; Lancaster 29'	Report

Umpires:
Irene Clelland (SCO)
Catalina Montesino Wenzel (CHL)

9 August 2010
13:20

Trinidad and Tobago	1–6	Uruguay
Siu-Butt 5'	Report	Olave 9', 15'; Mutilva 16', 36'; C. De María 22'; Nieto 28'

Umpires:
Romina Costanzo (ARG)
Stephanie Judefind (USA)

11 August 2010
10:00

Uruguay	10–1	Peru
Olave 6', 10', 11', 32'; Nieto 9', 11', 13'; Olaso 23'; Matalonga 29', 34'	Report	Vidal 23'

Umpires:
Catalina Montesino Wenzel (CHL)
Michelle Meister (GER)

11 August 2010
14:20

Canada	3–5	Trinidad and Tobago
Shier 4'; Lancaster 34'; Buttinger 36'	Report	Nieves 13'; Wynne 14', 40'; Siu-Butt 17'; Luces 24'

Umpires:
Stephanie Judefind (USA)
Romina Costanzo (ARG)

13 August 2010
09:00

Uruguay	3–2	Canada
C. De María 17'; Olaso 30'; Mutilva 33'	Report	Shier 8'; Buttinger 22'

Umpires:
Catalina Montesino Wenzel (CHL)
Irene Clelland (SCO)

13 August 2010
12:15

Trinidad and Tobago	4–0	Peru
Wynne 1'; Nieves 8'; Jones 18'; Luces 33'	Report

Umpires:
Romina Costanzo (ARG)
Stephanie Judefind (USA)

==== Pool B ====
Pos	Team	Pld	W	D	L	GF	GA	GD	Pts	Qualification
1	Argentina	3	3	0	0	17	0	+17	9	Advanced to Semi-Finals
2	United States	3	2	0	1	14	2	+12	6	Advanced to Semi-Finals
3	Venezuela (H)	3	0	1	2	2	12	−10	1	
4	Chile	3	0	1	2	2	21	−19	1	

Source: Pan American Hockey Federation
Rules for classification: 1) points; 2) goal difference; 3) games won; 4) head-to-head result.
(H) Hosts

9 August 2010
12:15

Argentina	10–0	Chile
Yanzi 8', 33', 37'; Nimo 12'; Méndez 14'; C. González 17'; A. González 21', 27', 30'; Gomes Fantasia 23'	Report

Umpires:
Michelle Meister (GER)
Wendy Stewart (CAN)

9 August 2010
15:30

Venezuela	0–5	United States
	Report	McEvoy 10'; Gerzabek 23', 25', 27'; Mathis 29'

Umpires:
Irene Clelland (SCO)
Liselle Parris (TTO)

11 August 2010
12:10

Venezuela	2–2	Chile
Cottin 8'; Aranguren 35'	Report	Gudenschwager 6', 16'

Umpires:
Liselle Parris (TTO)
Irene Clelland (SCO)

11 August 2010
15:25

United States	0–2	Argentina
	Report	Méndez 16', 30'

Umpires:
Wendy Stewart (CAN)
Michelle Meister (GER)

13 August 2010
11:10

United States	9–0	Chile
Blankmeyer 7'; Mathis 13', 34'; McEvoy 23', 27'; Gerzabek 28', 29', 39'; DiCroce 30'	Report

Umpires:
Michelle Meister (GER)
Wendy Stewart (CAN)

13 August 2010
15:25

Argentina	5–0	Venezuela
A. González 7', 24'; Yanzi 9'; Gomes Fantasia 27'; Paz 34'	Report

Umpires:
Liselle Parris (TTO)
Wendy Stewart (CAN)

=== Classification round ===
==== Fifth to eighth place classification ====
===== Seventh and eighth place =====
14 August 2010
10:15

Peru	4–5	Chile
Ardiles 18'; Delgado 25'; Jordán 33'; Vidal 39'	Report	Gudenschwager 1', 7', 10', 11', 31'

Umpires:
Liselle Parris (TTO)
Stephanie Judefind (USA)

===== Fifth and sixth place =====
14 August 2010
17:45

Canada	3–0	Venezuela
Woodcroft 17', 20'; Lancaster 28'	Report

Umpires:
Romina Costanzo (ARG)
Stephanie Judefind (USA)

==== First to fourth place classification ====
Semi-finals
14 August 2010
Uruguay	3
United States	2
14 August 2010
Argentina	4
Trinidad and Tobago	2

Final
15 August 2010
Uruguay	0 (0)
Argentina (pen.)	0 (1)
Third Place
15 August 2010
United States	2
Trinidad and Tobago	1

===== Semi-finals =====
14 August 2010
12:45

Uruguay	3–2 (a.e.t.)	United States
Olave 2'; Campos 14'; Mutilva 47'	Report	McEvoy 20', 37'

Umpires:
Irene Clelland (SCO)
Wendy Stewart (CAN)

14 August 2010
15:15

Argentina	4–2	Trinidad and Tobago
Gomes Fantasia 11'; Méndez 14'; Paz 21', 33'	Report	Abreu-Cockburn 4'; Luces 12'

Umpires:
Michelle Meister (GER)
Catalina Montesino Wenzel (CHL)

===== Third and fourth place =====
15 August 2010
09:00

United States	2–1	Trinidad and Tobago
Allaband 35'; McEvoy 36'	Report	Siu-Butt 31'

Umpires:
Wendy Stewart (CAN)
Catalina Montesino Wenzel (CHL)

===== Final =====
15 August 2010
11:30

Uruguay	0–0	Argentina
	Report
Penalties
C. De María (penalty shoot-out missed); Olave (penalty shoot-out missed); Mutilva (penalty shoot-out missed); Campos (penalty shoot-out missed); Matalonga (penalty shoot-out missed)	0–1	(penalty shoot-out scored) Yanzi; (penalty shoot-out missed) Nimo; (penalty shoot-out missed) Gomes Fantasia; (penalty shoot-out missed) Paz; (penalty shoot-out missed) A. González

Umpires:
Irene Clelland (SCO)
Michelle Meister (GER)

== Awards ==
Player of the Tournament	Top Goalscorers	Goalkeeper of the Tournament
(Uruguay) Carolina Mutilva	(Chile) Karin Gudenschwager (Uruguay) Anastásia Olave	(United States) Donna Chung

== Statistics ==
=== Final standings ===
Pos	Team	Pld	W	D	L	GF	GA	GD	Pts	Qualification
1st place, gold medalist(s)	Argentina	5	4	1	0	21	2	+19	13	Qualified to 2011 FIH Indoor World Cup
2nd place, silver medalist(s)	Uruguay	5	4	1	0	22	6	+16	13	
3rd place, bronze medalist(s)	United States	5	3	0	2	18	6	+12	9	
4	Trinidad and Tobago	5	2	0	3	13	15	−2	6	
5	Canada	4	2	0	2	12	8	+4	6	
6	Venezuela (H)	4	0	1	3	2	15	−13	1	
7	Chile	4	1	1	2	7	25	−18	4	
8	Peru	4	0	0	4	5	23	−18	0	

Source: Pan American Hockey Federation
(H) Hosts

=== Goalscorers ===
There were 100 goals scored in 18 matches, for an average of 5.56 goals per match.

7 goals

- (Chile) Karin Gudenschwager
- (Uruguay) Anastásia Olave

6 goals

- (United States) Katherine Gerzabek
- (United States) Alison McEvoy

5 goals

- (Argentina) Agustina González Mínguez

4 goals

- (Argentina) Agostina Méndez
- (Argentina) Emma Yanzi
- (Canada) Jessica Buttinger
- (Uruguay) Carolina Mutilva
- (Uruguay) Agustina Nieto

3 goals

- (Argentina) Julia Gomes Fantasia
- (Argentina) María Mercedes Paz
- (Canada) Angela Lancaster
- (Canada) Amanda Woodcroft
- (United States) Jennifer Mathis
- (Trinidad and Tobago) Yesenia Luces
- (Trinidad and Tobago) Stacey-Ann Siu-Butt
- (Trinidad and Tobago) Blair Wynne

2 goals

- (Canada) Kristen Shier
- (Peru) Nancy Vidal
- (Uruguay) Camila de María
- (Uruguay) Carolina Matalonga
- (Uruguay) Isabel Olaso
- (Trinidad and Tobago) Gayle-Ann Nieves

1 goal

- (Argentina) Carolina González Mínguez
- (Argentina) Eugenia Nimo
- (Peru) Ximena Ardiles
- (Peru) María Delgado
- (Peru) María José Jordán
- (United States) Dana Allaband
- (United States) Alison Blankmeyer
- (United States) Deanna DiCroce
- (Uruguay) Patrícia Campos
- (Trinidad and Tobago) Cristina Abreu-Cockburn
- (Trinidad and Tobago) Kecia Jones
- (Venezuela) Luisana Aranguren
- (Venezuela) María Rebeca Cottin
