= 2017 Women's Indoor Pan American Cup =

International indoor hockey competition

Tournament details
- Host country: Guyana
- City: Georgetown
- Dates: 16–21 October
- Teams: 7 (from 1 confederation)
- Venue(s): Cliff Anderson Sports Hall

Final positions
- Champions: United States (1st title)
- Runner-up: Argentina
- Third place: Uruguay

Tournament statistics
- Matches played: 25
- Goals scored: 156 (6.24 per match)
- Top scorer(s): (United States) Alison Campbell (19 goals)
- Best player: (United States) Alison Campbell

The 2014 Women's Indoor Pan American Cup was the 7th edition of the Indoor Pan American Cup, an indoor hockey competition. The tournament was held in Georgetown, Guyana, from 16–21 October.

The United States won the tournament for the first time, defeating Argentina 2–1 in the final. Uruguay won the bronze medal after defeating Canada 3–2 in the third place match.

== Teams ==
The following seven teams competed for the title:

- Argentina
- Barbados
- Canada
- Guyana
- Trinidad and Tobago
- United States
- Uruguay

== Results ==
=== Preliminary round ===
Pos	Team	Pld	W	D	L	GF	GA	GD	Pts	Qualification
1	United States	6	6	0	0	35	7	+28	18	Final
2	Argentina	6	5	0	1	28	8	+20	15	Final
3	Canada	6	4	0	2	14	8	+6	12	Third Place Match
4	Uruguay	6	3	0	3	24	11	+13	9	Third Place Match
5	Trinidad and Tobago	6	2	0	4	19	25	−6	6	
6	Guyana (H)	6	1	0	5	12	23	−11	3	
7	Barbados	6	0	0	6	7	57	−50	0	

Source: FIH
Rules for classification: 1) points; 2) goal difference; 3) games won; 4) head-to-head result.
(H) Hosts

==== Fixtures ====
16 October 2017
10:00

Barbados	1–14	Argentina
Small 34'	Report	Guzmán 1', 2', 3', 7'; Castañeda 9', 12'; Narváez 15', 23'; Nimo 20+', 26'; Paz 27'; Amaya 30'; Ríos 31', 37'

Umpires:
Karine Alves (FRA)
Ashley Hahn (USA)

16 October 2017
11:15

Uruguay	4–3	Guyana
Nieto 4'; Viana 15'; Algorta 22'; Barrandeguy 39'	Report	Woodroofe 13'; Gordon 23'; Eastman 38'

Umpires:
Vanessa Williamson (CAN)
Diana Fuentes Casteló (MEX)

16 October 2017
12:30

United States	7–2	Trinidad and Tobago
Barham 27', 29'; Popper 32', 34'; Campbell 33', 40'; Orobono 37'	Report	Wynne 2'; Henry 26'

Umpires:
Richanne Gaskin (BAR)
Rachel Williams (ENG)

16 October 2017
16:15

Canada	5–1	Barbados
Lee 8', 13'; Lancaster 18', 18', 40'	Report	Small 14'

Umpires:
Melina Illanes (ARG)
Natalia Lodeiro (URU)

16 October 2017
18:00

Argentina	3–0	Guyana
Luna 12'; Narváez 13'; Castañeda 34'	Report

Umpires:
Rachel Williams (ENG)
Ashley Hahn (USA)

16 October 2017
20:30

Trinidad and Tobago	0–4	Uruguay
	Report	Viana 20'; Nieto 25'; De María 38'; Barrandeguy 39'

Umpires:
Diana Fuentes Casteló (MEX)
Karine Alves (FRA)

17 October 2017
13:00

Guyana	0–2	Canada
	Report	Weber 6'; Leahy 15'

Umpires:
Richanne Gaskin (BAR)
Karine Alves (FRA)

17 October 2017
15:30

Trinidad and Tobago	0–4	Argentina
	Report	Guzmán 1'; Ríos 8'; Yanzi 21', 26'

17 October 2017
18:00

United States	3–1	Uruguay
Popper 2', 29'; Campbell 27'	Report	De María 22'

Umpires:
Melina Illanes (ARG)
Rachel Williams (ENG)

18 October 2017
14:00

Canada	3–0	Trinidad and Tobago
Leahy 20+', 31'; Pereira 32'	Report

Umpires:
Natalia Lodeiro (URU)
Diana Fuentes Casteló (MEX)

18 October 2017
16:30

Argentina	2–4	United States
Luna 35'; Yanzi 39'	Report	Campbell 10', 18', 22', 31'

Umpires:
Vanessa Williamson (CAN)
Karine Alves (FRA)

18 October 2017
19:00

Guyana	5–1	Barbados
G. Xavier 5', 14'; K. Fernandes 15'; Eastman 24'; Fiedtkou 32'	Report	King 19'

Umpires:
Ashley Hahn (USA)
Melina Illanes (ARG)

19 October 2017
11:30

Canada	2–1	Uruguay
Lee 27', 40+'	Report	Viana 31'

Umpires:
Diana Fuentes Casteló (MEX)
Rachel Williams (ENG)

19 October 2017
12:45

Barbados	0–10	United States
	Report	Popper 1', 21', 35'; Campbell 7', 9', 12', 36'; Wirth 18'; Barham 38'; Orobono 40'

Umpires:
Natalia Lodeiro (URU)
Melina Illanes (ARG)

19 October 2017
14:00

Trinidad and Tobago	6–3	Guyana
Williams 2'; Layne 5', 36'; Wynne 22', 40'; Lewis 37'	Report	Eastman 6'; Fiedtkou 18', 20+'

Umpires:
Karine Alves (FRA)
Richanne Gaskin (BAR)

19 October 2017
16:30

Argentina	2–1	Canada
Nimo 20'; Paz 34'	Report	Lancaster 30'

Umpires:
Rachel Williams (ENG)
Natalia Lodeiro (URU)

19 October 2017
17:45

Uruguay	12–0	Barbados
Nieto 4', 37'; Viana 5', 35'; Algorta 13'; De María 23', 27', 28', 37', 40'; Mutilva 24'; Mingroni 29'	Report

Umpires:
Vanessa Williamson (CAN)
Ashley Hahn (USA)

19 October 2017
19:00

Guyana	1–7	United States
Fiedtkou 36'	Report	Campbell 5', 19', 38', 39'; Popper 6'; Barham 17', 31'

Umpires:
Melina Illanes (ARG)
Richanne Gaskin (BAR)

20 October 2017
12:00

Uruguay	2–3	Argentina
Viana 2'; De María 25'	Report	Guzmán 4'; Narváez 8'; Yanzi 20'

Umpires:
Diana Fuentes Casteló (MEX)
Karine Alves (FRA)

20 October 2017
13:15

Barbados	4–11	Trinidad and Tobago
Wilson 2'; King 24'; Small 28'; Downes 28'	Report	Thompson 4'; Layne 9', 18'; Sa. De Freitas 11'; Hingh 12', 23'; Henry 14'; Williams 20', 30'; Sh. De Freitas 34'; Wynne 37'

Umpires:
Vanessa Williamson (CAN)
Natalia Lodeiro (URU)

20 October 2017
14:30

United States	4–1	Canada
Campbell 15', 20+', 31'; Barham 38'	Report	Lee 18'

Umpires:
Rachel Williams (ENG)
Melina Illanes (ARG)

=== Classification round ===
==== Fifth to seventh place classification ====
Crossover
20 October 2017
Guyana	4
Barbados	1

Fifth Place
21 October 2017
Trinidad and Tobago	3
Guyana	1

===== Crossover =====
20 October 2017
19:30

Guyana	4–1	Barbados
Fiedtkou 12', 20'; C. Fernandes 37'; Woodroofe 40+'	Report	Prescod 18'

Umpires:
Ashley Hahn (USA)
Vanessa Williamson (CAN)

===== Fifth and Sixth place =====
21 October 2017
11:55

Trinidad and Tobago	3–1	Guyana
Lewis 10'; Williams 23'; Wynne 39'	Report	Fiedtkou 26'

Umpires:
Natalia Lodeiro (URU)
Richanne Gaskin (BAR)

==== Third and fourth place ====
21 October 2017
14:45

Canada	2–3	Uruguay
Leahy 12'; Lee 15'	Report	Viana 4'; De María 6', 34'

Umpires:
Melina Illanes (ARG)
Diana Fuentes Casteló (MEX)

==== Final ====
21 October 2017
17:35

United States	2–1	Argentina
Gerzabek 31'; Campbell 35'	Report	Yanzi 34'

Umpires:
Karine Alves (FRA)
Rachel Williams (ENG)

== Awards ==
Player of the Tournament	Top Goalscorer	Goalkeeper of the Tournament	Young Player of the Tournament
(United States) Alison Campbell	(United States) Alison Campbell	(Canada) Kathryn Williams	(United States) Samantha Popper

== Statistics ==
=== Final standings ===
Pos	Team	Pld	W	D	L	GF	GA	GD	Pts	Qualification
1st place, gold medalist(s)	United States	7	7	0	0	37	8	+29	21	Qualified to 2018 FIH Indoor World Cup
2nd place, silver medalist(s)	Argentina	7	5	0	2	29	10	+19	15	
3rd place, bronze medalist(s)	Uruguay	7	4	0	3	27	13	+14	12	
4	Canada	7	4	0	3	16	11	+5	12	
5	Trinidad and Tobago	7	3	0	4	22	26	−4	9	
6	Guyana (H)	8	2	0	6	17	27	−10	6	
7	Barbados	7	0	0	7	8	61	−53	0	

Source: FIH
(H) Hosts

=== Goalscorers ===
There were 156 goals scored in 25 matches, for an average of 6.24 goals per match.

19 goals

- (United States) Alison Campbell

10 goals

- (Uruguay) Camila de María

8 goals

- (United States) Samantha Popper

7 goals

- (Guyana) Marzana Fiedtkou
- (Uruguay) Teresa Viana

6 goals

- (Argentina) Carina Guzmán
- (Canada) Alison Lee
- (United States) Mary Barham

5 goals

- (Argentina) Emma Yanzi
- (Trinidad and Tobago) Blair Wynne

4 goals

- (Argentina) María Narváez
- (Canada) Angela Lancaster
- (Canada) Kathleen Leahy
- (Trinidad and Tobago) Krizia Layne
- (Trinidad and Tobago) Arielle Williams
- (Uruguay) Agustina Nieto

3 goals

- (Argentina) Josefina Castañeda
- (Argentina) María Nimo
- (Argentina) Juliana Ríos Ferreyra
- (Barbados) Tammisha Small
- (Guyana) Nicole Eastman

2 goals

- (Argentina) Julieta Luna
- (Argentina) María Mercedes Paz
- (Barbados) Cher King
- (Guyana) Trisha Woodroofe
- (Guyana) Gabriella Xavier
- (Trinidad and Tobago) Zene Henry
- (Trinidad and Tobago) Brittney Hingh
- (Trinidad and Tobago) Alanna Lewis
- (United States) Madison Orobono
- (Uruguay) Milagros Algorta
- (Uruguay) Constanza Barrandeguy

1 goal

- (Argentina) Victoria Amaya
- (Barbados) Katrina Downes
- (Barbados) Jada Prescod
- (Barbados) Ayanna Wilson
- (Canada) Shannon Pereira
- (Canada) Michelle Weber
- (Guyana) Chantelle Fernandes
- (Guyana) Kerensa Fernandes
- (Guyana) Aliyah Gordon
- (Trinidad and Tobago) Savannah de Freitas
- (Trinidad and Tobago) Shaniah de Freitas
- (Trinidad and Tobago) Kristin Thompson
- (United States) Katherine Gerzabek
- (United States) Paityn Wirth
- (Uruguay) Luciana Mingroni
- (Uruguay) Carolina Mutilva
