= Madison Thompson =

Madison Thompson may refer to:

- Madison Thompson (actress)
- Madison Thompson (field hockey)
