= Amanda Woodcroft =

Uruguayan field and indoor hockey player

Personal information
- Full name: Amanda Zarine Woodcroft
- Born: 9 October 1993 (age 33) Kitchener, Ontario
- Height: 160 cm (5 ft 3 in)
- Weight: 50 kg (110 lb)

Sport
- Sport: Field hockey
- Position: Midfield
National team
Years	Team	Caps	Goals
2010–2014	Canada Indoor	15	(9)
2011–	Canada	127	(8)
Medal record
Representing Canada
Women's field hockey
Pan American Games
Silver medal – second place	2019 Lima	Team
Bronze medal – third place	2015 Toronto	Team
Pan American Cup
Bronze medal – third place	2013 Mendoza
Bronze medal – third place	2022 Santiago
Women's indoor hockey
Indoor Pan American Cup
Gold medal – first place	2014 Montevideo

Amanda Zarine Woodcroft (born 9 October 1993) is an indoor and field hockey player from Canada.

== Personal life ==
Amanda Woodcroft was born in Kitchener, Ontario, and grew up in the neighbouring city of Waterloo. She graduated from Sir John A. Macdonald Secondary School (now LHSS).

Woodcroft has a younger sister, Nicole, who also represents Canada in field hockey.

== Career ==
=== Indoor hockey ===
In 2010, Woodcroft made her debut for the Canadian indoor team at the Indoor Pan American Cup in Barquisimeto.

She represented the team again in 2014 in a number of tournaments. Most notably, Woodcroft was awarded Player of the Tournament at the Indoor Pan American Cup in Montevideo where she also won a gold medal.

=== Field hockey ===
==== Under 21 ====
After appearances with the senior national team, Woodcroft represented the Canada U–21 side at the 2013 FIH Junior World Cup in Mönchengladbach.

==== Senior national team ====
Woodcroft made her debut for the senior national team in 2011.

Following her debut, Woodcroft has gone on to represent the Canadian team at a number of tournaments and amassed over 100 caps.

She has medalled with the national team a number of times, winning silver at the 2018–19 FIH Series Finals in Valencia and the 2019 Pan American Games in Lima. In addition, she has won bronze at the 2013 Pan American Cup in Mendoza and the 2015 Pan American Games in Toronto.

In 2018, she was a member of the national team at the 2018 Commonwealth Games on the Gold Coast.
