= Milagros Algorta =

Uruguayan field hockey player

Personal information
- Full name: Milagros Algorta Ferrari
- Born: 11 April 1997 (age 29) Montevideo, Uruguay
- Height: 165 cm (5 ft 5 in)
- Weight: 64 kg (141 lb)

Sport
- Sport: Field hockey
- Position: Forward
National team
Years	Team	Caps	Goals
2014	Uruguay U–18	15	(3)
2015–	Uruguay	45	(34)
2017–2021	Uruguay Indoor	12	(5)
Medal record
Representing Uruguay
Women's field hockey
South American Games
Silver medal – second place	2018 Cochabamba	Team
Bronze medal – third place	2022 Asunción	Team
Women's indoor hockey
Indoor Pan American Cup
Bronze medal – third place	2017 Georgetown	Team

Milagros Algorta Ferrari (born 11 April 1997) is a Uruguayan field hockey player, who plays as a midfielder.

== Career ==
=== Indoor hockey ===
Milagros Algorta has competed at two Indoor Pan American Cups. She represented Uruguay at the 2017 and 2021 editions, winning bronze at the former.

=== Field hockey ===
==== Under–18 ====
In 2014, Algorta was a member of the Uruguay U–18 team at the Youth Olympic Games in Nanjing.

==== Las Cimarronas ====
Algorta made her senior international debut for Las Cimarronas in 2015, during the FIH World League in Valencia.

Since her debut, Algorta has been a constant member in the national team. She won silver and bronze at the 2018 and 2022 editions of the South American Games, respectively.

In 2023, she was named in the squad for the Pan American Games in Santiago.
