= Poulakis =

Poulakis (Greek: Πουλάκης) is a Greek surname. People with the surname include:

- Nicole Poulakis (born 2004), Canadian field and indoor hockey player
- Theodore Poulakis (1622–1692), Greek painter
