= Teresa Viana =

Uruguayan field and indoor hockey player

Personal information
- Full name: María Teresa Viana Aché
- Born: 26 March 1993 (age 33) Montevideo, Uruguay
- Height: 174 cm (5 ft 9 in)

Sport
- Sport: Field hockey
- Position: Forward
- Club: Carrasco Polo Club
National team
Years	Team	Caps	Goals
2012–	Uruguay	46	(25)
2017–	Uruguay Indoor	11	(10)
Medal record
Representing Uruguay
Women's field hockey
Pan American Cup
Bronze medal – third place	2025 Montevideo
South American Games
Silver medal – second place	2018 Cochabamba	Team
Women's indoor hockey
Indoor Pan American Cup
Bronze medal – third place	2017 Georgetown	Team

María Teresa Viana Aché (born 26 March 1993) is an indoor and field hockey player from Uruguay.

== Personal life ==
Teresa Viana comes from a large family, being one of twelve siblings.

== Career ==
=== Indoor ===
Teresa Viana made her debut for the Uruguayan indoor team at the 2017 Indoor Pan American Cup in Georgetown, where she won a bronze medal.

She went on to represent the team again at the 2021 Indoor Pan American Cup in Spring City, Pennsylvania.

=== Field hockey ===
Viana made her debut for the national team in 2012 during the inaugural season of the FIH World League.

She was a member of the team at the 2017 Pan American Cup in Lancaster. The following year she won a silver medal at the 2018 South American Games in Cochabamba.

In 2019, she appeared at the FIH Series Finals in Hiroshima, and the Pan American Games in Lima.
