= Kathleen Leahy =

Canadian field hockey player

Personal information
- Born: 29 October 1993 (age 33) Victoria, British Columbia
- Height: 165 cm (5 ft 5 in)
- Weight: 65 kg (143 lb)

Sport
- Sport: Field hockey
- Position: Defender
National team
Years	Team	Caps	Goals
2013–	Canada	104	(4)
2017–	Canada Indoor	21	(10)
Medal record
Representing Canada
Women's field hockey
Pan American Cup
Bronze medal – third place	2022 Santiago	Team
Women's indoor hockey
Indoor Pan American Cup
Silver medal – second place	2021 Spring City	Team

Kathleen Leahy (born 29 October 1993) is an indoor and outdoor field hockey player from Canada.

== Personal life ==
Kathleen Leahy was born and raised in Victoria, British Columbia.

== Career ==
=== Indoor hockey ===
Leahy made her debut for the Canadian Indoor team in 2017, at the Indoor Pan American Cup in Georgetown.

Four years later she represented the team again, winning a silver medal at her second Indoor Pan American Cup in Spring City.

==== Field hockey ====
Kathleen Leahy debuted for the national team in 2013 during an international tour to Europe.

Leahy has competed in many international tournaments including the XXI Commonwealth Games in the Gold Coast, the 2022 Pan American Cup in Santiago, Chile, and the 2022 FIH World Cup in Terassa, Spain.

She won her first medal in 2022, taking home bronze at the Pan American Cup in Santiago.
