= Constanza Barrandeguy =

Uruguayan field hockey player

Personal information
- Full name: Constanza Barrandeguy Fernández
- Born: 7 April 1996 (age 30) Montevideo, Uruguay
- Height: 173 cm (5 ft 8 in)
- Weight: 64 kg (141 lb)

Sport
- Sport: Field hockey
- Position: Midfield
National team
Years	Team	Caps	Goals
2013–	Uruguay	57	(17)
2017–2021	Uruguay Indoor	8	(8)
Medal record
Representing Uruguay
Women's field hockey
Pan American Cup
Bronze medal – third place	2025 Montevideo
South American Games
Bronze medal – third place	2022 Asunción	Team
Women's indoor hockey
Indoor Pan American Cup
Bronze medal – third place	2017 Georgetown

Constanza Barrandeguy Fernández (born 7 April 1996) is a Uruguayan field hockey player, who plays as a midfielder.

== Career ==
=== Indoor hockey ===
Constanza Barrandeguy has competed at two Indoor Pan American Cups. She represented Uruguay at the 2017 and 2021 editions, winning bronze at the former.

=== Field hockey ===
==== Under–18 ====
In 2014, Barrandeguy was a member of the Uruguay U–18 team at the Youth Olympic Games in Nanjing.

==== Las Cimarronas ====
Barrandeguy made her senior international debut for Las Cimarronas in 2013, at the Pan American Cup in Mendoza.

Since her debut, Barrandeguy has been a constant member in the national team. In 2022, she was named co-captain of the team, leading the squad to a bronze medal at the South American Games in Asunción.

In 2023, she was named in the squad for the Pan American Games in Santiago.
