= Agustina Nieto =

Uruguayan field and indoor hockey player

Personal information
- Full name: María Agustina Nieto Serra
- Born: 15 May 1989 (age 37) Montevideo, Uruguay
- Height: 175 cm (5 ft 9 in)

Sport
- Sport: Field hockey
- Position: Defence
National team
Years	Team	Caps	Goals
2008–	Uruguay	98	(9)
2010–2017	Uruguay Indoor	23	(11)
Medal record
Representing Uruguay
Women's field hockey
South American Games
Silver medal – second place	2018 Cochabamba	Team
Bronze medal – third place	2014 Santiago	Team
Women's indoor hockey
Indoor Pan American Cup
Silver medal – second place	2010 Barquisimeto	Team
Bronze medal – third place	2017 Georgetown	Team

María Agustina Nieto Serra (born 15 May 1989) is an indoor and field hockey player from Uruguay.

== Personal life ==
Agustina Nieto was born and raised in Montevideo, Uruguay. She is one of five siblings, having four brothers.

== Career ==
=== Field hockey ===
Nieto made her debut for Las Cimarronas in 2008, at the South American Championship in Montevideo. Since her debut, Nieto has gone on the represent the national team in multiple major tournaments, and in 2016 became captain of the national team.

She has won two medals at the South American Games, bronze at the 2014 edition in Santiago and silver at the 2018 edition in Cochabamba.

In 2019, she was a member of the team at the Pan American Games in Lima.

=== Indoor ===
Agustina Nieto made her debut for the Uruguayan indoor team at the 2010 Indoor Pan American Cup, where she won a silver medal.

She went on to represent the team again at the 2011 Indoor World Cup in Poznań, as well as the 2014 and 2017 Indoor Pan American Cups in Montevideo and Georgetown respectively.
