= Field hockey at the 2013 Bolivarian Games =

- Venue: Estadio de Hockey Sobre Césped
- Location: Chiclayo, Peru
- Dates: 23–30 November
- Nations: 6

Champions
- Men: Venezuela
- Women: Venezuela

Field hockey, for the 2013 Bolivarian Games, took place from 23 November to 30 November 2013.

== Medal summary ==
=== Medalists ===
Event	Gold	Silver	Bronze
Men	Venezuela; Dixson Abreu; Andy Adrian; Anderson Antique; Junior Benitez; Wilmer Bracamonte; Yordano Castro; Manuel Samuel Garcia Rodriguez; Reymer Malave; Retsell Marcano; Antony Mendoza; Jose Oropeza; Frederick Rodriguez; Simon Rojas; Raudin Simancas; Wilmer Vargas; Cristian Vargas	Chile; Nicolas Alfredo Bravo Nallar; Joaquín Cifuentes Kretschme; Ignacio Contardo Schmidt; Cristobal Contardo Schmidt; Rodrigo David Acevedo; William Oscar Enos Lira; Luis Matias Esparza Cancino; Carlos Alberto Lagos Salgado; Jose Tomas Lopez Molinet; José Pedro Maldonado Maira; Tomas Maluk Ramirez; Joaquin Arturo Olavarria Yuraszeck; Diego Ordoñez Grass; Andres Guillermo Ovalle Rodriguez; Martin Rodriguez Ducaud; Esteban Andres Tapia Bravo	Dominican Republic; Francisco Antonio Blanco Melenciano; Argeny Cabrera Figueroa; Hugo Enrique Cruz Linares; Luis Manuel de los Santos Rijo; Braulin Emiliano de la Rosa; Michael Alexander Lopez; José Rafael López; Víctor Manuel Medina Araujo; Joel Antonio Moncion Maleno; Jeffrey Antonio Monción Maleno; Yafre Reyes; Yafre Reyes Casilla; Wander Rodriguez Figueroa; Alberto Ruiz Mata; Cleudys Arabel Soler
Women	Venezuela; Jessica Barrios; Gisel Caquimbo; Sthephanie Gonzalez; Maholy Hernandez; Eddy Lozada; Loreis Mencia; Lady Mendoza; Eva Montes; Carolina Pargas; Mery Rodriguez; Leidy Rubio; Derly Sanchez; Johandry Sanchez; Genesis Sanz; Damaisa Toro; Tania Yepez	Peru; Marianella Alvarez Raygada; Claudia Maria Ardiles Parra; Ximena Ardiles Parra; Chiara Fiorentina Conetta Fassioli; Alejandra Cecilia Dancuart Zimmermann; Natsumi Diaz Muñoz; Maria Jose Fermi Blanco; Anaid Gonzales Finseth; Valeria Simonetta León Kropf; Maira Camilla Loaiza Soracco; Camila Carolina Mendez Kahn; Maria Adelaida Danie Olaechea Olaechea; Yurandi Hilaine Quino Rios; Leyla Elizabeth Rojas Soto; Giannisa Jimena Vecco Reynafarge; Monica Velezmoro de Peralta	Dominican Republic; Yanirys Caraballo Ramos; Mayerlin Adalgiza Cedeño del Rosario; Yaniret de la Cruz Lara; Rosa Andreina de la Rosa Acevedo; Teresa de la Rosa Joaquin; Cindy Luandy de la Rosa Joaquin; Benifer Moronta Perez; Albania Marte Mabreaux; Paola Martes Tejeda; Lucia Navanuel Miceli; Magalys del Carmen Ortega Mateo; Sabrely Deyalit Reyes Arias; Daneiry Rivas Javier; Julieta Roncati Lizarraga; Norma Cristina Sanchez Castillo; Yenny Yan León

=== Medal table ===
* Host nation (Peru)

Rank	Nation	Gold	Silver	Bronze	Total
1	Venezuela (VEN)	2	0	0	2
2	Chile (CHI)	0	1	0	1
2	Peru (PER)*	0	1	0	1
4	Dominican Republic (DOM)	0	0	2	2
Totals (4 entries)		2	2	2	6

== Men's tournament ==
Men's field hockey at the 2013 Bolivarian Games
Tournament details
- Host country: Peru
- City: Chiclayo
- Dates: 23–30 November
- Teams: 6 (from 1 confederation)

Final positions
- Champions: Venezuela
- Runner-up: Chile
- Third place: Dominican Republic

Tournament statistics
- Matches played: 18
- Goals scored: 146 (8.11 per match)
- Top scorer: (Chile) Martin Rodriguez (15 goals)

=== Round-robin ===
Pos	Team	Pld	W	D	L	GF	GA	GD	Pts	Qualification
1	Venezuela	5	5	0	0	32	4	+28	15	Gold medal match
2	Chile	5	4	0	1	50	4	+46	12	Gold medal match
3	Dominican Republic	5	3	0	2	31	9	+22	9	Bronze medal match
4	Peru (H)	5	2	0	3	16	15	+1	6	Bronze medal match
5	Guatemala	5	1	0	4	7	26	−19	3	Fifth place game
6	Ecuador	5	0	0	5	1	79	−78	0	Fifth place game

Source: FIH
(H) Hosts

23 November 2019
12:00

Chile	28–0	Ecuador
	Report

23 November 2019
14:00

Dominican Republic	6–0	Guatemala
	Report

23 November 2019
16:00

Venezuela	2–0	Peru
	Report

24 November 2019
10:00

Ecuador	0–18	Dominican Republic
	Report

24 November 2019
14:00

Venezuela	6–0	Guatemala
	Report

24 November 2019
16:00

Chile	8–0	Peru
	Report

26 November 2019
10:00

Ecuador	0–18	Venezuela
	Report

26 November 2019
12:00

Dominican Republic	1–4	Chile
	Report

26 November 2019
16:00

Guatemala	1–5	Peru
	Report

27 November 2019
10:00

Venezuela	3–2	Chile
	Report

27 November 2019
14:00

Guatemala	6–1	Ecuador
	Report

27 November 2019
16:00

Peru	2–4	Dominican Republic
	Report

29 November 2019
12:00

Dominican Republic	2–3	Venezuela
	Report

29 November 2019
14:00

Chile	8–0	Guatemala
	Report

29 November 2019
16:00

Peru	9–0	Ecuador
	Report

=== Classification round ===
==== Fifth and sixth place ====
30 November 2019
11:00

Guatemala	3–0	Ecuador
	Report

==== Bronze medal match ====
30 November 2019
13:30

Dominican Republic	2–0	Peru
	Report

==== Gold medal match ====
30 November 2019
16:00

Venezuela	3–2	Chile
	Report

=== Final standings ===
1. Venezuela
2. Chile
3. Dominican Republic
4. Peru
5. Guatemala
6. Ecuador

== Women's tournament ==
Women's field hockey at the 2013 Bolivarian Games
Tournament details
- Host country: Peru
- City: Chiclayo
- Dates: 23–30 November
- Teams: 3 (from 1 confederation)

Final positions
- Champions: Venezuela
- Runner-up: Peru
- Third place: Dominican Republic

Tournament statistics
- Matches played: 6
- Goals scored: 28 (4.67 per match)
- Top scorer: (Venezuela) Yamileth Pargas (6 goals)

=== Pool ===
Pos	Team	Pld	W	D	L	GF	GA	GD	Pts
1st place, gold medalist(s)	Venezuela	4	4	0	0	19	3	+16	12
2nd place, silver medalist(s)	Peru (H)	4	0	2	2	5	13	−8	2
3rd place, bronze medalist(s)	Dominican Republic	4	0	2	2	4	12	−8	2

Source: FIH
(H) Hosts

=== Fixtures ===
23 November 2019
10:00

Venezuela	3–2	Dominican Republic
	Report

24 November 2019
12:00

Peru	2–6	Venezuela
	Report

26 November 2019
14:00

Dominican Republic	2–2	Peru
	Report

27 November 2019
12:00

Dominican Republic	0–6	Venezuela
	Report

29 November 2019
10:00

Venezuela	4–0	Peru
	Report

30 November 2019
09:00

Peru	1–1	Dominican Republic
	Report
