= Chile national field hockey team =

Chile national field hockey team may refer to:

- Chile men's national field hockey team
- Chile women's national field hockey team
