= Corinne Zanolli =

American field hockey player

Personal information
- Born: August 21, 1998 (age 27) Pittsburgh, Pa., United States
- Height: 5 ft 6 in (168 cm)

Sport
- Sport: Field hockey
- Position: Striker
- Club: Surbiton
National team
| Years | Team | Caps | Goals |
| 2014– | United States | | - |
Medal record
Indoor Pan American Cup
| Gold medal – first place | 2021 Spring City |

Corinne Zanolli is an American women's field hockey player, and a member of the indoor and outdoor national teams. She has playing experience in the Pan American cups and Berlin Indoor FIH World Cup.

She also plays for Stanford University in California, where she attends college, where she set two records in season points scored.
