= Camila de María =

Uruguayan field and indoor hockey player

Personal information
- Full name: Camila de María Mulet
- Born: 30 April 1991 (age 35) Uruguay
- Height: 154 cm (5 ft 1 in)

Sport
- Sport: Field hockey
- Position: Forward
National team
| Years | Team | Caps | Goals |
| 2010– | Uruguay Indoor | 17 | (15) |
| 2018– | Uruguay | 16 | (1) |
Medal record
Representing Uruguay
Women's field hockey
Pan American Cup
| Bronze medal – third place | 2025 Montevideo |
South American Games
| Silver medal – second place | 2018 Cochabamba | Team |
Women's indoor hockey
Indoor Pan American Cup
| Silver medal – second place | 2010 Barquisimeto |
| Bronze medal – third place | 2017 Georgetown |

Camila de María Mulet (born 30 April 1991) is an indoor and field hockey player from Uruguay.

== Career ==
=== Indoor ===
Camila de María made her debut for the Uruguayan indoor team at the 2010 Indoor Pan American Cup, where she won a silver medal.

She went on to represent the team again at the 2017 and 2021 Indoor Pan American Cups, winning bronze at the former.

=== Field hockey ===
Following her appearances with the national indoor team, De María went on to debut for the national team in 2018 at the South American Games, where she won a silver medal.

In 2019, she appeared at the FIH Series Finals in Hiroshima, and the Pan American Games in Lima.
