= 2021 Women's Indoor Pan American Cup =

Indoor hockey tournament

Tournament details
- Host country: United States
- City: Spring City
- Dates: June 25–27
- Teams: 5 (from 1 confederation)

Final positions
- Champions: United States (2nd title)
- Runner-up: Canada
- Third place: Argentina

Tournament statistics
- Matches played: 12
- Goals scored: 96 (8 per match)
- Top scorer: (United States) Hope Rose (13 goals)
- Best player: (United States) Ashley Sessa

The 2021 Women's Indoor Pan American Cup was the eighth edition of the Women's Indoor Pan American Cup, the quadrennial international women's indoor hockey championship of the Americas organized by the Pan American Hockey Federation. It was held alongside the men's tournament in Spring City, Pennsylvania, United States from June 25 to 27, 2021.

The winners, United States, qualified for the 2022 Women's FIH Indoor Hockey World Cup in Liège, Belgium.

== Results ==
=== Round-robin ===
Pos	Team	Pld	W	D	L	GF	GA	GD	Pts	Qualification
1	United States (H)	4	3	1	0	30	10	+20	10	Final
2	Canada	4	2	1	1	20	7	+13	7	Final
3	Argentina	4	1	2	1	20	7	+13	5	Third place game
4	Uruguay	4	1	2	1	11	6	+5	5	Third place game
5	Guyana	4	0	0	4	3	54	−51	0	
6	Trinidad and Tobago	0	0	0	0	0	0	0	0	Withdrew

Source: FIH
Rules for classification: 1) points; 2) matches won; 3) goal difference; 4) goals for; 5) head-to-head result; 6) field goals scored.
(H) Hosts

June 25, 2021
09:00

Canada	1–1	Uruguay
Leahy 19'	Report	Viana 2'

Umpires:
Melina Illanes (ARG)
Judy Yurkofsky (USA)

June 25, 2021
11:30

Guyana	2–20	United States
Cadogan 28', 31'	Report	Rose 1', 14', 16', 17', 23', 39', 40+'; Heck 7', 15'; Zanolli 8', 19'; Sessa 12', 18', 18', 30+', 38'; Orobono 24'; Yeager 27', 29', 39'

Umpires:
Natalia Lodeiro (URU)
Alex Miles (CAN)

June 25, 2021
13:30

Argentina	2–2	Uruguay
Guzmán 13'; Agudo 32'	Report	Algorta 6'; Viana 26'

Umpires:
Judy Yurkofsky (USA)
Ridge Bair (USA)

June 25, 2021
16:00

Canada	4–5	United States
Thompson 20', 23'; Lee 35'; Leahy 37'	Report	Zanolli 10'; Sessa 12'; Tapman 14'; Rose 17', 19'

Umpires:
Melina Illanes (ARG)
Diego Barbas (ARG)

June 25, 2021
18:00

Guyana	0–14	Argentina
	Report	Guzmán 2', 28'; Zanni 3', 9'; Gomes 8', 8', 20', 20+'; Nimo 12'; Irianni 28'; Berola 29'; Agudo 33', 39'; Rios 35'

Umpires:
Natalia Lodeiro (URU)
Donny Gobinsingh (TTO)

June 26, 2021
09:00

United States	2–1	Uruguay
Rose 32'; Sessa 33'	Report	De María 34'

Umpires:
Melina Illanes (ARG)
Devin Hooper (GUY)

June 26, 2021
11:30

Canada	13–0	Guyana
Carvalho 10+', 31'; Lee 14', 19', 20'; Thompson 15', 37'; Leahy 21', 27', 30', 40'; Poulakis 22'; Lancaster 40'	Report

Umpires:
Judy Yurkofsky (USA)
Natalia Lodeiro (URU)

June 26, 2021
13:30

United States	3–3	Argentina
Campbell 4'; Rose 15'; Yeager 24'	Report	Gomes 20'; Nimo 35'; Agudo 40+'

Umpires:
Donny Gobinsingh (TTO)
Alex Miles (CAN)

June 26, 2021
16:00

Uruguay	7–1	Guyana
Barrandeguy 3', 29', 36'; Piazza 6', 40'; De María 27'; Correa 38'	Report	Fiedtkou 24'

Umpires:
Melina Illanes (ARG)
Judy Yurkofsky (USA)

June 26, 2021
18:00

Argentina	1–2	Canada
Gomes 37'	Report	Lee 31', 39'

Umpires:
Natalia Lodeiro (URU)
Ridge Bair (USA)

=== Classification round ===
==== Third place game ====
June 27, 2021
12:00

Argentina	5–4	Uruguay
Guzmán 12'; Coccaro 16', 33', 35'; Gomes 29'	Report	Viana 21'; Mutilva 23'; Barrandeguy 30'; De María 33'

Umpires:
Ridge Bair (USA)
Alex Miles (CAN)

==== Final ====
June 27, 2021
15:00

United States	3–0	Canada
Sessa 4'; Rose 6', 40'	Report

Umpires:
Diego Barbas (ARG)
Melina Illanes (ARG)

== Statistics ==
=== Final standings ===
Qualified for the 2022 World Cup

Rank	Team
1st place, gold medalist(s)	United States
2nd place, silver medalist(s)	Canada
3rd place, bronze medalist(s)	Argentina
4	Uruguay
5	Guyana

=== Awards ===
The following awards were given at the conclusion of the tournament.

Top goalscorer	Player of the tournament	Goalkeeper of the tournament
(United States) Hope Rose	(United States) Ashley Sessa	(Canada) Kathryn Williams

=== Goalscorers ===
There were 96 goals scored in 12 matches, for an average of 8 goals per match.

13 goals

- (United States) Hope Rose

8 goals

- (United States) Ashley Sessa

7 goals

- (Argentina) Julia Gomes Fantasia

6 goals

- (Canada) Kathleen Leahy
- (Canada) Alison Lee

4 goals

- (Argentina) Luciana Agudo
- (Argentina) Carina Guzmán
- (Canada) Madison Thompson
- (Uruguay) Constanza Barrandeguy
- (United States) Elizabeth Yeager

3 goals

- (Argentina) Lucia Coccaro
- (Uruguay) Camila de María
- (Uruguay) Teresa Viana
- (United States) Corinne Zanolli

2 goals

- (Argentina) María Nimo
- (Argentina) Romina Zanni
- (Canada) Rebecca Carvalho
- (Guyana) Abosaide Cadogan
- (United States) Ryleigh Heck
- (Uruguay) Camila Piazza

1 goal

- (Argentina) María Berola
- (Argentina) Lara Irianni
- (Argentina) Juliana Rios
- (Canada) Angela Lancaster
- (Canada) Nicole Poulakis
- (Guyana) Marzana Fiedtkou
- (United States) Ali Campbell
- (United States) Madison Orobono
- (United States) Kasey Tapman
- (Uruguay) Milagros Algorta
- (Uruguay) María Correa
- (Uruguay) Carolina Mutilva

Source: FIH

== See also ==
- 2021 Men's Indoor Pan American Cup
