= Madison Thompson (field hockey) =

Australian field hockey player (born 1994)

Personal information
- Born: 11 August 1994 (age 31) Waterloo, Canada

Sport
- Sport: Field hockey
- Position: Attacker
National team
Years	Team	Caps	Goals
2013–	Canada Indoor	33	(16)
2021–	Canada	18	(5)
Medal record
Women's field hockey
Representing Canada
Pan American Cup
Bronze medal – third place	2022 Santiago	Team
Women's field hockey
Indoor Pan American Cup
Gold medal – first place	2014 Montevideo	Team
Silver medal – second place	2021 Spring City	Team

Madison Thompson (born 11 August 1994) is an indoor and field hockey player from Canada, who plays as an attacker.

== Personal life ==
Madison Thompson was born and raised in Waterloo, Ontario.

Thompson was a student-athlete at Kent State University where she won 4 Mid-American Conference Regular Season titles, 3 Mid-American Conference Tournament titles and 3 NCAA appearances. She was named Mid-American Tournament Most Valuable Player in 2016.

== Career ==
=== Indoor hockey ===
Thompson made her debut for the Canada Indoor team in 2013 in a test series against the United States in Feasterville.

During her indoor career, Thompson has won gold and silver medals at the 2014 and 2021 editions of the Indoor Pan American Cup, respectively.

=== Field hockey ===
Following years in the indoor program, Thompson made her senior international debut in 2021 during a test series against the United States in Chula Vista.

In 2022 she represented the Canada at the Pan American Cup in Santiago, where she won a bronze medal that helped Canada qualify for the FIH Women's World Cup for the first time since 1994. She was a member of both the 2022 FIH World Cup and 2022 Commonwealth Games.
