= 2014 Women's Indoor Pan American Cup =

International indoor hockey competition

Tournament details
- City: Montevideo, Uruguay
- Dates: 7–12 April
- Teams: 8 (from 1 confederation)
- Venue: The British Schools

Final positions
- Champions: Canada (2nd title)
- Runner-up: Argentina
- Third place: United States

Tournament statistics
- Matches played: 10
- Goals scored: 40 (4 per match)
- Top scorer: (Uruguay) Isabel Olaso (5 goals)
- Best player: (Canada) Amanda Woodcroft

The 2014 Women's Indoor Pan American Cup was the 6th edition of the Indoor Pan American Cup, an indoor hockey competition. The tournament was held in Montevideo, Uruguay, from 7–12 April.

Canada won the tournament for the second time, defeating Argentina 3–1 in the final. The United States won the bronze medal after defeating Uruguay 2–1 in penalties following a 1–1 draw.

== Teams ==
The following four teams competed for the title:

- Argentina
- Canada
- United States
- Uruguay

== Results ==
=== Preliminary round ===
Pos	Team	Pld	W	D	L	GF	GA	GD	Pts
1	Uruguay (H)	3	2	0	1	10	5	+5	6
2	Canada	3	1	1	1	12	4	+8	4
3	United States	3	1	1	1	4	5	−1	4
4	Argentina	3	1	0	2	3	15	−12	3

Source: FIH
Rules for classification: 1) points; 2) goal difference; 3) games won; 4) head-to-head result.
(H) Hosts

==== Fixtures ====
7 April 2014
19:30

Argentina	0–10	Canada
	Report	Woodcroft 2', 5', 20+'; Thompson 7', 31'; Thicke 18'; Mitchell 24'; Shier 25'; O'Neale 33'; Pereira 38'

Umpires:
Ana Faias (POR)
Stephanie Judefind (USA)

7 April 2014
22:00

Uruguay	2–3	United States
Mora 14'; Lamberti 24'	Report	Ciufo 29', 32'; Matson 40+'

Umpires:
Keely Dunn (CAN)
Melina Illanes (ARG)

8 April 2014
19:30

Canada	0–0	United States
	Report

Umpires:
Melina Illanes (ARG)
Maritza Pérez (URU)

8 April 2014
22:00

Uruguay	4–0	Argentina
Nieto 6'; Lamberti 20'; Olaso 22', 29'	Report

Umpires:
Lisa Hernández (TTO)
Keely Dunn (CAN)

9 April 2014
19:30

Argentina	3–1	United States
Ríos 12'; Yanzi 21'; Eichler 38'	Report	Fleischut 15'

Umpires:
Maritza Pérez (URU)
Ana Faias (POR)

9 April 2014
22:00

Canada	2–4	Uruguay
Lee 29'; Watson 33'	Report	Olaso 2', 7', 23'; Mutilva 12'

Umpires:
Stephanie Judefind (USA)
Lisa Hernández (TTO)

=== Classification round ===
Semi-finals
10 April 2014
Uruguay	0 (0)
Argentina (pen.)	0 (1)
10 April 2014
Canada	5
United States	0

Final
12 April 2014
Argentina	1
Canada	3
Third Place
12 April 2014
Uruguay	1 (1)
United States (pen.)	1 (2)

==== Semi-finals ====
10 April 2014
20:45

Canada	5–0	United States
Lee 5', 37'; O'Neale 18'; Thompson 35'; Watson 40+'	Report

Umpires:
Ana Faias (POR)
Melina Illanes (ARG)

10 April 2014
22:15

Uruguay	0–0	Argentina
	Report
Penalties
Mora (penalty shoot-out missed); Mutilva (penalty shoot-out missed); Olaso (penalty shoot-out missed)	0–1	(penalty shoot-out missed) Zanni; (penalty shoot-out scored) Ríos

Umpires:
Keely Dunn (CAN)
Stephanie Judefind (USA)

==== Third and fourth place ====
12 April 2014
14:00

Uruguay	1–1	United States
Nieto 23'	Report	Fleischut 12'
Penalties
Mora (penalty shoot-out missed); Lamberti (penalty shoot-out missed); Mutilva (penalty shoot-out scored)	1–2	(penalty shoot-out missed) Milne; (penalty shoot-out scored) Ciufo; (penalty shoot-out scored) Matson

Umpires:
Melina Illanes (ARG)
Keely Dunn (CAN)

==== Final ====
12 April 2014
15:30

Argentina	1–3	Canada
Ríos 7'	Report	Lee 11'; Thompson 27'; Shier 34'

Umpires:
Stephanie Judefind (USA)
Ana Faias (POR)

== Awards ==
Player of the Tournament	Top Goalscorers	Goalkeeper of the Tournament
(Canada) Amanda Woodcroft	(Uruguay) Isabel Olaso	(Argentina) Laura del Colle

== Statistics ==
=== Final standings ===
Pos	Team	Pld	W	D	L	GF	GA	GD	Pts	Qualification
1st place, gold medalist(s)	Canada	5	3	1	1	20	5	+15	10	Qualified to 2015 FIH Indoor World Cup
2nd place, silver medalist(s)	Argentina	5	1	1	3	4	18	−14	4	
3rd place, bronze medalist(s)	United States	5	1	2	2	5	11	−6	5	
4	Uruguay (H)	5	2	2	1	11	6	+5	8	

Source: FIH
(H) Hosts

=== Goalscorers ===
There were 40 goals scored in 10 matches, for an average of 4 goals per match.

5 goals

- (Uruguay) Isabel Olaso

4 goals

- (Canada) Alison Lee
- (Canada) Madison Thompson

3 goals

- (Canada) Amanda Woodcroft

2 goals

- (Argentina) Juliana Ríos
- (Canada) Kyesia O'Neale
- (Canada) Kristen Shier
- (Canada) Kaelan Watson
- (United States) Susan Ciufo
- (United States) Amanda Fleischut
- (Uruguay) Lucía Lamberti
- (Uruguay) Agustina Nieto

1 goal

- (Argentina) Sofía Eichler
- (Argentina) Emma Yanzi
- (Canada) Jocelyn Mitchell
- (Canada) Shannon Pereira
- (Canada) Alexandra Thicke
- (United States) Erin Matson
- (Uruguay) Sofía Mora
- (Uruguay) Carolina Mutilva
