= 2008 Women's Indoor Pan American Cup =

International indoor hockey competition

Tournament details
- City: San Juan, Argentina
- Dates: 19–23 November
- Teams: 6 (from 1 confederation)

Final positions
- Champions: Argentina (1st title)
- Runner-up: United States
- Third place: Mexico

Tournament statistics
- Matches played: 20
- Goals scored: 93 (4.65 per match)
- Top scorer: (United States) Jennifer Mathis (16 goals)
- Best player: (Argentina) Vilma Bustos

The 2008 Women's Indoor Pan American Cup was the 4th edition of the Indoor Pan American Cup, an indoor hockey competition. The tournament was held in San Juan, Argentina, from 19–23 November.

Argentina won the tournament for the first time, defeating the United States 4–2 in the final. Mexico won the bronze medal after defeating Peru 1–0 in the third place match.

== Teams ==
The following eight teams competed for the title:

- Argentina
- Chile
- Mexico
- Paraguay
- Peru
- United States

== Results ==
=== Preliminary round ===
Pos	Team	Pld	W	D	L	GF	GA	GD	Pts	Qualification
1	United States	5	5	0	0	31	2	+29	15	Advanced to Semi-Finals
2	Argentina (H)	5	3	1	1	19	5	+14	10	Advanced to Semi-Finals
3	Mexico	5	2	2	1	11	17	−6	8	Advanced to Semi-Finals
4	Peru	5	1	2	2	5	13	−8	5	Advanced to Semi-Finals
5	Paraguay	5	1	0	4	5	24	−19	3	
6	Chile	5	0	1	4	6	16	−10	1	

Source: PAHF
Rules for classification: 1) points; 2) goal difference; 3) games won; 4) head-to-head result.
(H) Hosts

==== Fixtures ====
19 November 2008
16:00

United States	11–0	Mexico
Mathis 3', 11', 19', 27', 40'; McEvoy 8', 18', 26'; Zelenak 9'; Bloemker 31'; Ford 38'	Report

Umpires:
Wendy Stewart (CAN)
Cinthia Mellí (ARG)

19 November 2008
17:00

Chile	2–2	Peru
T. Merino 16'; Carballo 20'	Report	Ardiles 8'; Vidal 24'

Umpires:
Arely Castellanos (MEX)
Beatrice Mongelos (PAR)

19 November 2008
20:00

Argentina	8–1	Paraguay
Paz 4', 9', 13', 17'; González 30', 33', 36'; Yanzi 39'	Report	Ruíz 27'

Umpires:
Wendy Stewart (CAN)
Arely Castellanos (MEX)

20 November 2008
09:00

Mexico	5–2	Chile
Correa 3', 8'; Cota 18'; Solís 37', 40'	Report	T. Merino 14'; Gudenschwager 22'

Umpires:
Beatrice Mongelos (PAR)
Wendy Stewart (CAN)

20 November 2008
10:00

Paraguay	1–11	United States
O. Spiridonoff Arrom 11'	Report	Mathis 1', 24', 27', 34'; McEvoy 7', 26'; Hood 11'; Randall 29'; Peisch 35', 39'; McConville 37'

Umpires:
Carlos García (MEX)
Arely Castellanos (MEX)

20 November 2008
11:00

Peru	0–3	Argentina
	Report	Yanzi 15'; Paz 15', 26'

Umpires:
Beatrice Mongelos (PAR)
Carlos García (MEX)

20 November 2008
16:00

Paraguay	1–0	Chile
O. Spiridonoff Arrom 35'	Report

Umpires:
Arely Castellanos (MEX)
Wendy Stewart (CAN)

20 November 2008
17:00

Mexico	1–1	Peru
Chávez 28'	Report	Gaete 18'

Umpires:
Cinthia Mellí (ARG)
Beatrice Mongelos (PAR)

20 November 2008
20:00

Argentina	0–1	United States
	Report	Mathis 22'

Umpires:
Carlos García (MEX)
Arely Castellanos (MEX)

21 November 2008
09:00

United States	6–0	Peru
Mathis 13', 14'; Valeo 17'; McEvoy 25', 37'; Zelenak 40'	Report

Umpires:
Beatrice Mongelos (PAR)
Diego Barbas (ARG)

21 November 2008
10:00

Mexico	3–1	Paraguay
Cota 13'; Chávez 20'; Calderón 36'	Report	T. Spiridonoff Arrom 32'

Umpires:
Wendy Stewart (CAN)
Cinthia Mellí (ARG)

21 November 2008
11:00

Chile	1–6	Argentina
T. Merino 12'	Report	Alonso 9'; J. Bustos 14'; Vena 15'; González 22'; Paz 26'; Yanzi 32'

Umpires:
Arely Castellanos (MEX)
John Hrystak (CAN)

21 November 2008
15:00

Peru	2–1	Paraguay
Vidal 3', 23'	Report	O. Spiridonoff Arrom 31'

Umpires:
Cinthia Mellí (ARG)
Arely Castellanos (MEX)

21 November 2008
16:00

United States	2–1	Chile
Mathis 4'; McConville 33'	Report	Gudenschwager 37'

Umpires:
Beatrice Mongelos (PAR)
Ruben Vargas (ARG)

21 November 2008
19:00

Argentina	2–2	Mexico
Alonso 20'; González 36'	Report	Chávez 4'; Cota 37'

Umpires:
Wendy Stewart (CAN)
Beatrice Mongelos (PAR)

=== Classification round ===
==== Fifth and sixth place ====
23 November 2008
09:15

Paraguay	1–2	Chile
Ruíz 23'	Report	Carballo 30'; Gudenschwager 37'

Umpires:
Carlos García (MEX)
Ruben Vargas (ARG)

==== First to fourth place classification ====
Semi-finals
22 November 2008
United States	2
Peru	0
22 November 2008
Argentina	3
Mexico	1

Final
23 November 2008
United States	2
Argentina	4
Third Place
23 November 2008
Peru	0
Mexico	1

===== Semi-finals =====
22 November 2008
15:00

Argentina	3–1	Mexico
González 2', 8'; Yanzi 20'	Report	Correa 15'

Umpires:
Wendy Stewart (CAN)
Beatrice Mongelos (PAR)

22 November 2008
17:30

United States	2–0	Peru
Mathis 2', 23'	Report

Umpires:
Cinthia Mellí (ARG)
Arely Castellanos (MEX)

===== Third and fourth place =====
23 November 2008
10:30

Peru	0–1 (a.e.t.)	Mexico
	Report	Chávez 41'

Umpires:
Beatrice Mongelos (PAR)
Cinthia Mellí (ARG)

===== Final =====
23 November 2008
13:00

United States	2–4	Argentina
Mathis 13'; McEvoy 28'	Report	Paz 18'; González 20'; Alonso 22'; Yanzi 32'

Umpires:
Arely Castellanos (MEX)
Wendy Stewart (CAN)

== Awards ==
Player of the Tournament	Top Goalscorers	Goalkeeper of the Tournament
(Argentina) Vilma Bustos	(United States) Jennifer Mathis	(Mexico) Alícia Takeda

== Statistics ==
=== Final standings ===
Pos	Team	Pld	W	D	L	GF	GA	GD	Pts	Qualification
1st place, gold medalist(s)	Argentina (H)	7	5	1	1	26	8	+18	16	Tournament Champion
2nd place, silver medalist(s)	United States	7	6	0	1	35	6	+29	18	
3rd place, bronze medalist(s)	Mexico	7	3	2	2	13	20	−7	11	
4	Peru	7	1	2	4	5	16	−11	5	
5	Chile	6	1	1	4	8	17	−9	4	
6	Paraguay	6	1	0	5	6	26	−20	3	

Source: Pan American Hockey Federation
(H) Hosts

=== Goalscorers ===
There were 93 goals scored in 20 matches, for an average of 4.65 goals per match.

16 goals

- (United States) Jennifer Mathis

8 goals

- (Argentina) María Mercedes Paz
- (Argentina) Agustina González Mínguez
- (United States) Alison McEvoy

5 goals

- (Argentina) Emma Yanzi

4 goals

- (Mexico) Sally Chávez Cota

3 goals

- (Argentina) Julieta Alonso
- (Chile) Karin Gudenschwager
- (Chile) Trinidad Merino
- (Mexico) Cindy Correa
- (Mexico) Eliana Cota Felipé
- (Paraguay) Olga Spiridonoff Arrom
- (Peru) Nancy Vidal

2 goals

- (Chile) Valentina Carballo
- (Mexico) Silvia Solís Alvarado
- (Paraguay) María Ruíz Díaz
- (United States) Corrine McConville
- (United States) Virginia Peisch
- (United States) Denise Zelenak

1 goal

- (Argentina) Jessica Bustos
- (Argentina) Milagros Vena
- (Mexico) Blanca Calderón Villafuerte
- (Paraguay) Tamara Spiridonoff Arrom
- (Peru) Ximena Ardiles
- (Peru) Jennifer Gaete
- (United States) Rachael Bloemker
- (United States) Maren Ford
- (United States) Kelly Hood
- (United States) Meredith Randall
- (United States) Emily Valeo
