= Nicole Poulakis =

Canadian field hockey player

Personal information
- Born: 25 June 2004 (age 22) Toronto, Canada
- Height: 160 cm (5 ft 3 in)
- Weight: 50 kg (110 lb)

Sport
- Sport: Field hockey
- Position: Forward
- Club: University of New Hampshire
National team
Years	Team	Caps	Goals
2023–	Canada U–21	17	(1)
2025–	Canada	0	(0)
Medal record
Women's indoor hockey
Representing Canada
Indoor Pan American Cup
Silver medal – second place	2021 Spring City

Nicole Poulakis (born 25 June 2004) is a field and indoor hockey player from Canada.

== Personal life ==
Poulakis grew up in Ajax, a town in the Durham Region of Southern Ontario, Canada.

She is a student at the University of New Hampshire.

== Field hockey ==
=== Domestic league ===
Poulakis currently competes in the intercollegiate competition in the United States hosted by the National Collegiate Athletic Association. In the league, she represents the Wildcats of the University of New Hampshire. She previously represented Dolphins Hockey Club in the domestic league of Field Hockey Ontario.

=== Under–21 ===
Since 2023, Poulakis has been a member of the Canada U–21 squad. She made her debut for the team at the 2023 Pan American Junior Championship in Saint Michael, where they finished in fourth place. Later that year she represented the team again at the 2023 FIH Junior World Cup in Santiago.

In 2024 she continued representing the national under–21 squad, appearing at the Pan American Junior Championship in Surrey.

=== Senior national team ===
Poulakis received her first call-up to the senior national squad in 2024. She was named as a travelling reserve for the squad at the 2023–24 FIH Nations Cup in Terrassa.

In 2025, she was again named as a travelling reserve, this time for the 2024–25 FIH Nations Cup in Santiago. Despite not earning any international caps at either of the FIH Nations Cups, Poulakis is set to make her senior international debut during the 2025 Pan American Cup in Montevideo.

== Indoor hockey ==
In addition to field hockey, Poulakis has also represented the Canada Indoor team. She won a silver medal with the team at the 2021 Indoor Pan American Cup in Spring City.
