= Camila Caram =

Chilean field hockey player

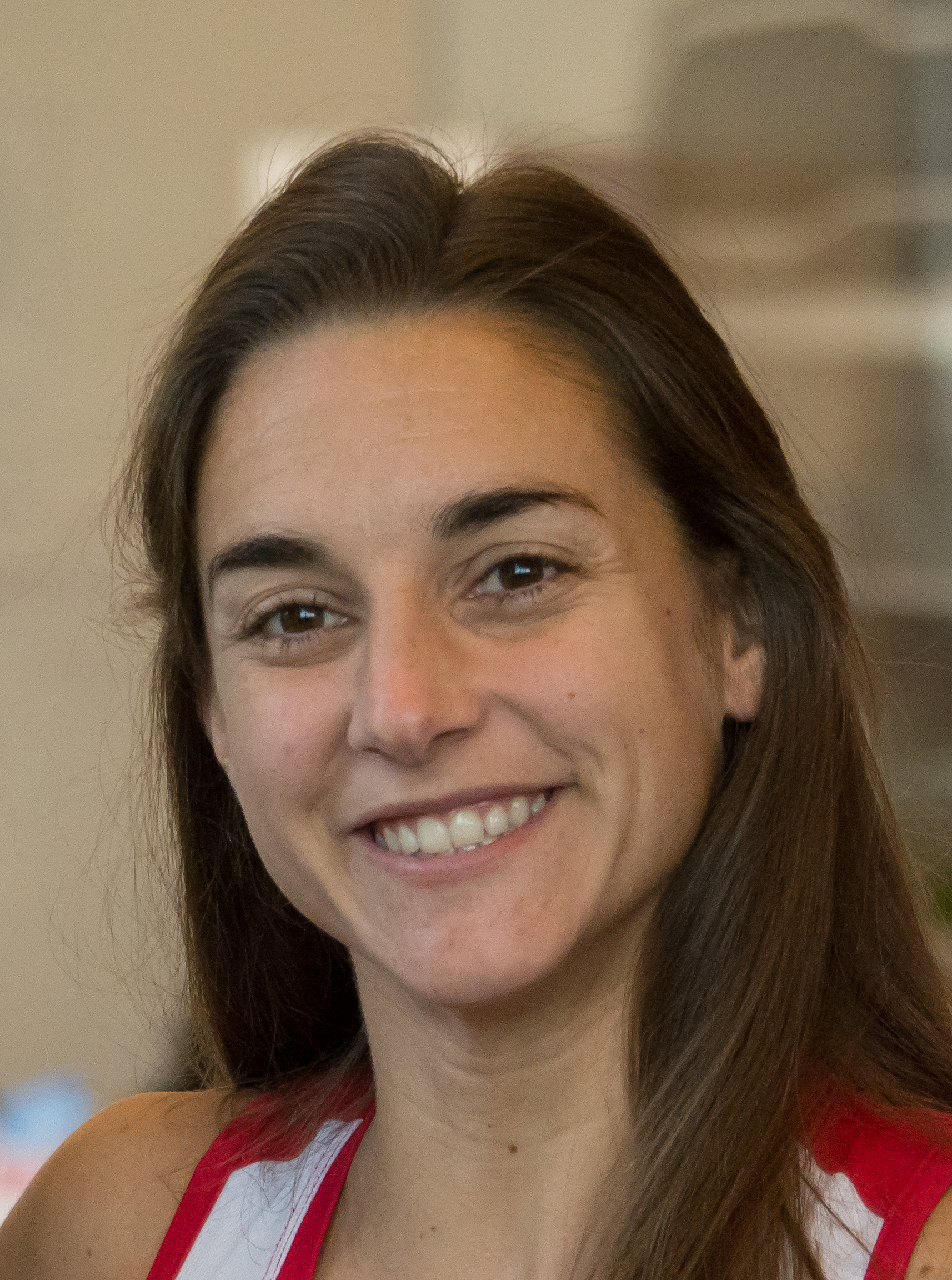

Personal information
- Full name: Camila Caram
- Born: 22 April 1989 (age 37) Chile

Sport
- Sport: Field hockey
- Position: Defender
- Club: PWCC
National team
Years	Team	Caps	Goals
2006–2024	Chile	276	(49)
2008–2009	Chile U–21	12	(3)
Medal record
Women's field hockey
Representing Chile
Pan American Games
Bronze medal – third place	2023 Santiago	Team
Bronze medal – third place	2011 Guadalajara	Team
Pan American Cup
Silver medal – second place	2022 Santiago
Silver medal – second place	2017 Lancaster
Bronze medal – third place	2009 Hamilton
FIH Nations Cup
Bronze medal – third place	2023–24 Terrassa	Team
South American Games
Gold medal – first place	2022 Asunción	Team
Bronze medal – third place	2018 Cochabamba	Team
Silver medal – second place	2014 Santiago	Team
Silver medal – second place	2006 Buenos Aires	Team
Pan American Junior Championship
Silver medal – second place	2008 Mexico City	Team

Camila Caram Walbaum (born 22 April 1989) is a former Chilean field hockey player and player for Prince of Wales Country Club.

One of the most recognized field hockey player in Chile, historic captain and part of "Las Diablas" for 18 years.

Caram made her debut for the Chile women's national field hockey team in 2006, and retired June 2024 with her last tournament being the Nations Cup in Terrassa, Spain .

== Club career ==
Since 1994 until the present day she has played for Prince of Wales Country Club (PWCC)

Only in 2014-2016 she went to play abroad to Mannheimer Hockey Club.

== International career ==
She began playing hockey at the age of 5 in PWCC following Daniela, her older sister's steps. She made her full international debut in 2006, but missed out on a place in the Chilean squad for the 2007 Panamerican Games in Rio de Janeiro. After this, she was selected for every tournament in the Chilean squad.

2008 she participated of the Junior Panam Cup in Ciudad de Mexico, where they made history beating Argentina on the semi finals for the first time, and obtaining a silver medal.

She obtained the first bronze medal for Chile in the 2009 Pan American Cup and in 2011 the first bronze medal in the Pan American Games in Guadalajara.

Her first appearance as captain of the National Team, was in 2013 playing the Pan American Cup in Mendoza, but then assumed the rol fully from 2015.

In 2017 she obtained historical silver medal in the Pan American Cup in Lancaster, USA. This same year she was elected as Captain of Team Chile, the Chilean squad of all sports.

In 2022 she obtained silver medal in the Pan American Cup in Santiago, which gave the team the first historical qualification to the World Cup in Netherlands and Spain ending up in 13th place. This same year, she participated in the South American Games, winning in shootouts over Argentina in the final, obtaining a gold medal and making history once again as the first time Chile beat Argentina.

The 2023 Pan American Games were held in Santiago, Chile where she obtained the 2nd bronze medal for the country in the history of Pan American Games.

Her final tournament was the 2024 Nation's Cup in Terrassa, Spain finishing in third place which was a great way to end her hockey career.

In her retirement of international hockey, she will prioritize her family and her Foundation called Impúlsate, which is dedicated to teach socio-emotional skills to underprivileged children through hockey.

She has been participating in the Athletes Committee of the FIH since she was elected in 2020, and this year the committee voted for her to be the president, and represent de athletes in the board of the FIH until 2028.

== Education ==
Caram went to The Grange School from 1995 to 2007.

She has a degree in structural civil engineering in Pontificia Universidad Católica obtained in 2014.

== Recognitions and Prizes ==
She was elected best hockey player in 2014, 2015, 2016 and 2018 by the prestigious "Circulo de Periodistas Deportivos de Chile". In 2017 Caram was recognized as one of the 100 women leaders in Chile and one of the 100 young leaders in the country.

Caram was named in the 2022 Pan American Elite Team for the sixth time by the Pan American Hockey Federation holding a record with Pat Harris also selected 6 times.
