= Juan Amoroso =

Chilean field hockey player

Personal information
- Full name: Juan Ignacio Amoroso Zirpel
- Born: 8 July 1997 (age 29) Chile

Sport
- Sport: Field hockey
- Position: Defence
Senior career
Years	Team	Caps	Goals
2021–	Royal Uccle	-	-
National team
Years	Team	Caps	Goals
2015–	Chile	68	(36)
2015–2016	Chile U–21	10	(6)
Medal record
Men's field hockey
Representing Chile
Pan American Cup
Silver medal – second place	2022 Santiago	Team
South American Games
Silver medal – second place	2018 Cochabamba	Team
Silver medal – second place	2022 Asunción	Team
Pan American Junior Championship
Bronze medal – third place	2016 Toronto	Team

Juan Ignacio Amoroso Zirpel (born 8 July 1997) is a field hockey player from Chile.

== Personal life ==
Amoroso has a younger cousin, Agustín, who has also represented Chile in field hockey.

== Career ==
=== Los Diablos ===
Amoroso made his senior debut for Chile in 2015 during a test event for the Summer Olympics in Rio de Janeiro.

Since his debut, Amoroso has been a regular inclusion in the national squad. He has medalled with the team on numerous occasions, including silver at the South American Games in 2018 and 2022, as well as the 2022 Pan American Cup.

In 2022, he was named in the PAHF's Elite Team for the first time.

=== Junior national team ===
Juan Amoroso made his debut for the Chile U–21 team in 2015. The following year he won a bronze medal with the team at the Pan American Junior Championship in Toronto.
