= Josefa Villalabeitia =

Chilean field hockey player (born 1990)

Personal information
- Full name: Josefa Andrea Villalabeitia Ford
- Born: 12 October 1990 (age 35) Chile
- Height: 165 cm (5 ft 5 in)
- Weight: 57 kg (126 lb)

Sport
- Sport: Field hockey
- Position: Attacker
National team
Years	Team	Caps	Goals
–	Chile	146	-
Medal record
Women's field hockey
Representing Chile
Pan American Cup
Silver medal – second place	2017 Lancaster	Team
South American Games
Silver medal – second place	2014 Santiago	Team
Bronze medal – third place	2018 Cochabamba	Team

Josefa Villalabeitia Ford (born 12 October 1990) is a Chilean field hockey player.

Villalabeitia has represented Chile at both junior and senior levels. She made her junior debut at the 2008 Pan-Am Junior Championship, and her senior debut at the 2013 South American Championship in Santiago.

Villalabeitia has represented Chile at two South American Games, in Santiago 2014 and Cochabamba 2018. The team medalled at both evens, winning silver in 2014 and bronze in 2018.

Villalabeitia was a member of the Chile team at the 2017 Pan American Cup. The team won a silver medal, after a historic semi-final victory over the United States progressed the team to the final. The team ultimately lost to Argentina 4–1 in the final.
