= Venezuela women's national field hockey team =

Venezuela
- Association: Venezuelan Field Hockey Federation (Federación Venezolana de Hockey sobre Cesped)
- Confederation: PAHF (Americas)

FIH ranking
- Current: 80 ▲2 (4 August 2026)

Pan American Cup
- Appearances: 1 (first in 2001)
- Best result: 7th (2001)
Medal record
Bolivarian Games
Gold medal – first place	2013 Chiclayo	Team
Central American and Caribbean Games
Bronze medal – third place	2026 Santo Domingo	Team

The Venezuela women's national field hockey team represents Venezuela in women's international field hockey competitions. The team is controlled by the Venezuelan Field Hockey Federation, the governing body for field hockey in Venezuela. Venezuela won its first medal at the Central American and Caribbean Games, by securing bronze at the 2026 edition.

== Tournament record ==
=== Pan American Cup ===
- 2001 – 7th place

=== Central American and Caribbean Games ===
- 1998 – 6th place
- 2026 – (bronze)

=== South American Games ===
- 2014 – 6th place

=== South American Championship ===
- 2008 – 5th place
- 2010 – 6th place

=== Bolivarian Games ===
- 2013 – (gold)

== Results and fixtures ==
The following is a list of match results in the last 12 months, as well as any future matches that have been scheduled.

Win Draw Loss Fixture

=== 2026 ===
==== 2026 CAC Games ====
26 July 2026 Pool A	Puerto Rico	1–4	Venezuela	Santo Domingo, Dominican Republic
14:00	Vazquez 14'	Report	González 46', 58'; Mujica 49'; Rodriguez 54'	Stadium: Parque del Este Hockey Stadium

28 July 2026 Pool A	Dominican Republic	3–6	Venezuela	Santo Domingo, Dominican Republic
16:00	Birocho 2'; Ortega 17'; Gonzalez 51'	Report	González 12', 58'; Sanchez 25', 55'; Navas 26', 59'	Stadium: Parque del Este Hockey Stadium

30 July 2026 Pool A	Mexico	6–2	Venezuela	Santo Domingo, Dominican Republic
12:00	Estrada 22'; Espinoza 28', 32'; Pérez 52'; Aguilera 54'; Lacheno 56'	Report	Beltran 14'; Mujica 18'	Stadium: Parque del Este Hockey Stadium

1 August 2026 Semi final	Cuba	6–0	Venezuela	Santo Domingo, Dominican Republic
14:45	Vera 9', 20'; Martinez 24'; Tamayo 37'; Darias 44', 49'	Report		Stadium: Parque del Este Hockey Stadium

3 August 2026 Bronze medal match	Barbados	1–4	Venezuela	Santo Domingo, Dominican Republic
12:30	Downes 19'	Report	Sanchez 10'; Rodriguez 11'; Artigas 14'; Mujica 49'	Stadium: Parque del Este Hockey Stadium

== See also ==
- Venezuela men's national field hockey team
