= Julia Gomes Fantasia =

Argentine field hockey player

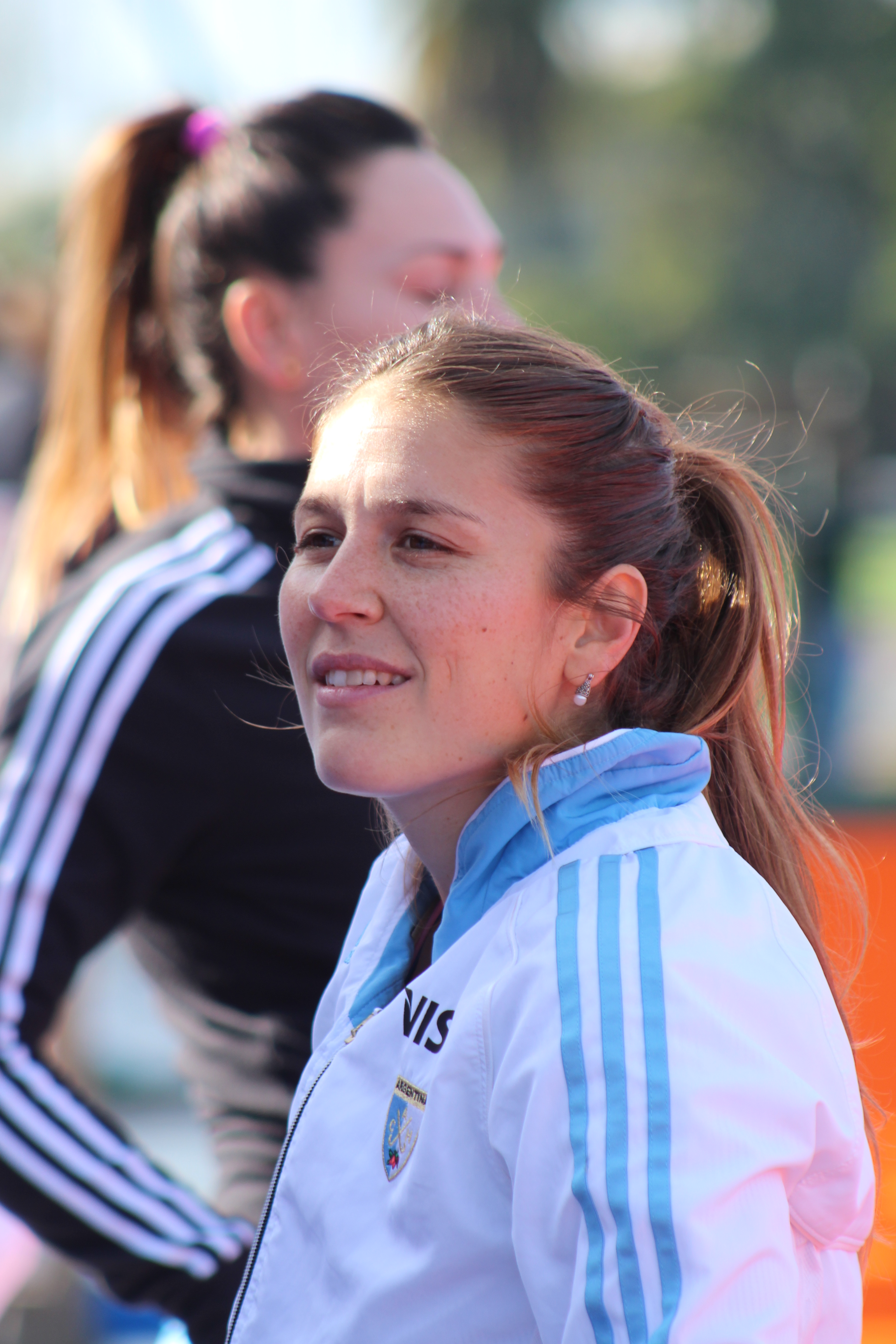

Personal information
- Full name: Julia Mailén Gomes Fantasia
- Born: 30 April 1992 (age 34) Puerto Madryn, Argentina
- Height: 1.61 m (5 ft 3 in)
- Weight: 59 kg (130 lb)

Sport
- Sport: Field hockey
- Position: Defender
- Club: GEBA
Youth career
- Team
- –: Club Náutico Atlántico Sud
- –: Club Cultural y Deportivo Alumni
Senior career
Years	Team	Caps	Goals
–	Deportivo Madryn	-	-
–	GEBA	-	-
2019–	Atlètic Terrassa Hockey Club	-	-
National team
Years	Team	Caps	Goals
2011–2013	Argentina U21		-
2012–	Argentina	157	(38)
2021–	Argentina indoor	10	(15)
Medal record
Champions Trophy
Gold medal – first place	2014 Mendoza
Gold medal – first place	2016 London
Bronze medal – third place	2018 Changzhou
Pan American Games
Silver medal – second place	2015 Toronto	Team
Pan American Cup
Gold medal – first place	2013 Mendoza
Gold medal – first place	2017 Lancaster
Junior World Cup
Silver medal – second place	2013 Mönchengladbach
Pan American Junior Championship
Gold medal – first place	2012 Guadalajara
Indoor Pan American Cup
Gold medal – first place	2010 Barquisimeto
Bronze medal – third place	2021 Spring City

Julia Mailén Gomes Fantasia (born 30 April 1992) is an Argentine field hockey player.

== Career ==
At the 2013 Pan American Cup she won her first gold medal with the Argentina national team in an international tournament. Julia also won two Champions Trophy and the World League 2014–15. She was part of the Argentine team at the 2016 Summer Olympics in Rio de Janeiro.
