= Ali Campbell (field hockey) =

United States field and indoor hockey player

Ali McEvoy
Personal information
- Full name: Ali McEvoy
- Born: 13 October 1991 (age 34) Bryn Mawr, United States

Sport
- Sport: Field hockey
- Position: Defense
- Club: X–Calibur
National team
Years	Team	Caps	Goals
2013–	United States Indoor	37	(51)
2014–	United States	38	(3)
Medal record
Women's indoor hockey
Representing United States
Indoor Pan American Cup
Gold medal – first place	2017 Georgetown	Team
Gold medal – first place	2021 Spring City	Team
Silver medal – second place	2008 San Juan	Team
Bronze medal – third place	2010 Barquisimeto	Team

Ali McEvoy (born 13 October 1991) is an indoor and field hockey player from the United States.

== Personal life ==
Ali McEvoy was born and raised in Bryn Mawr, Pennsylvania.

In 2013, McEvoy completed a bachelor's degree in family sciences at the University of Maryland.

== College ==
McEvoy was a four-year starter at the University of Maryland and helped lead the Terrapins to two NCAA National Championships and two ACC Championships. She was an NFHCA First Team All-American, an NFHCA All-Rookie Team member, and a 2013 womensfieldhockey.com First Team All-American. Additionally, she was named to the All-ACC Team as a sophomore and was the 2013 ACC Defensive Player of the Year.

== Career ==
=== Indoor ===
In 2008, McEvoy became the youngest player at the time to join the Indoor team and made her competitive debut for the United States Indoor team at the 2008 Indoor Pan American Cup in San Juan.

Throughout her indoor career, McEvoy has medaled with the team at four Indoor Pan American Cups, winning gold in 2017 and 2021, silver in 2008 and bronze in 2010. In 2017, she named the Pan American Games Top Goal Scorer and Tournament MVP. In 2021 she became captain of the team.

McEvoy was also a member of the team at the 2018 Indoor World Cup in Berlin.

=== Field hockey ===
As well as indoor hockey, McEvoy also played field hockey for the United States national team. She debuted in 2014, and has gone on to represent the team in 37 international games.

Her most notable performance with the team was during season two of the FIH Pro League.

She holds the distinction of the youngest player to ever compete on the indoor team and was the first player to represent the USA on two national field hockey teams simultaneously.
