= Manuela Urroz =

Chilean field hockey player (born 1991)

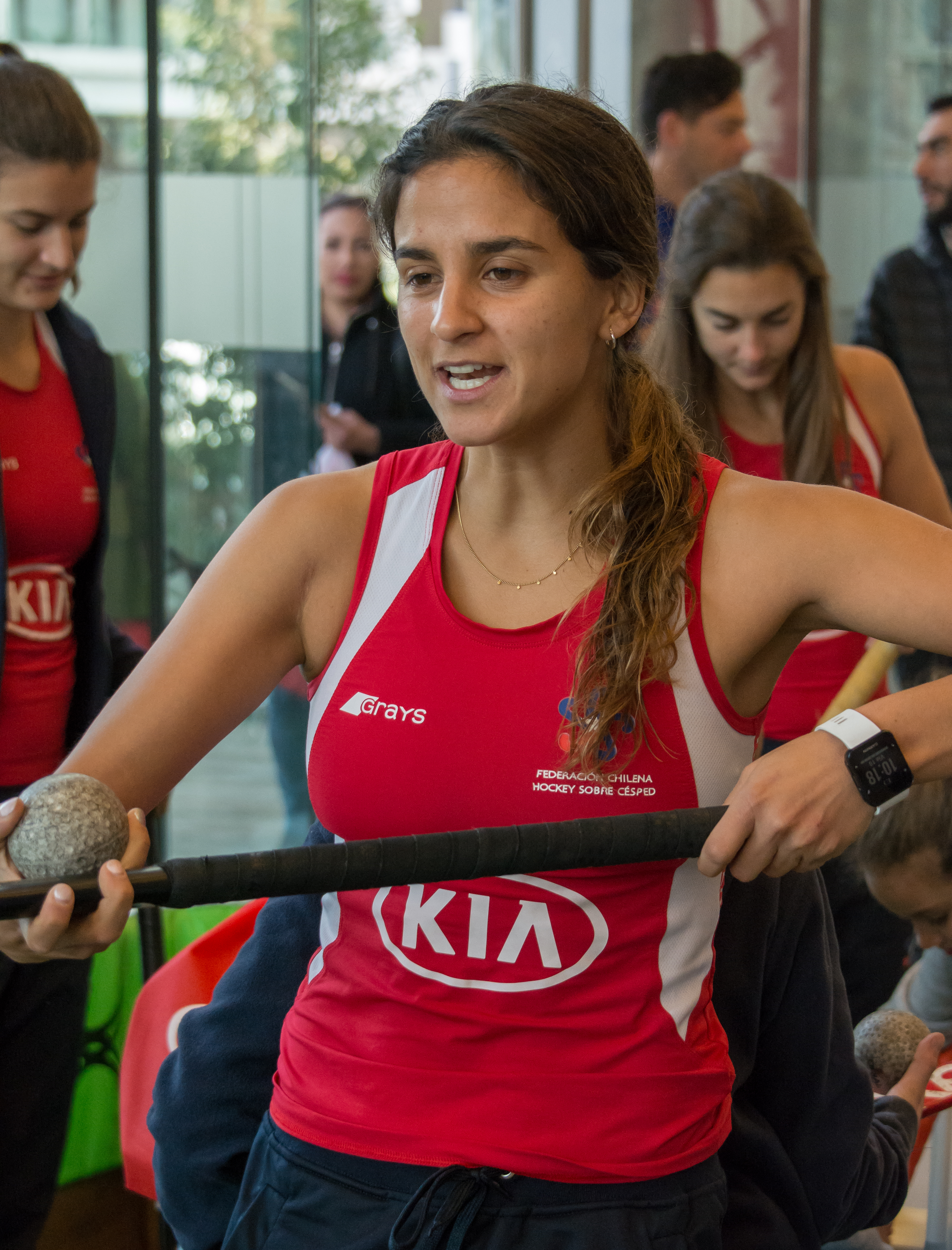

Personal information
- Full name: Manuela Urroz
- Born: 24 September 1991 (age 34) Chile

Sport
- Sport: Field hockey
- Position: Attacker
- Club: Royal Antwerp
National team
Years	Team	Caps	Goals
2009–	Chile	172	-
Medal record
Women's field hockey
Representing Chile
Pan American Games
Bronze medal – third place	2011 Guadalajara	Team
Bronze medal – third place	2023 Santiago	Team
Pan American Cup
Silver medal – second place	2017 Lancaster
Silver medal – second place	2022 Santiago
FIH Nations Cup
Bronze medal – third place	2023–24 Terrassa	Team
South American Games
Gold medal – first place	2022 Asunción	Team
Silver medal – second place	2014 Santiago	Team
Bronze medal – third place	2018 Cochabamba	Team

Manuela Urroz (born 24 September 1991) is a Chilean field hockey player.

Urroz has been part of both the Chile junior and senior national teams. She made her junior debut at the 2008 Pan-Am Junior Championship, and her senior debut just a year later at the 2009 Champions Challenge.
