= Women's Indoor Pan American Cup =

International indoor hockey competition

- Current season, competition or edition: 2024 Women's Indoor Pan American Cup
- Sport: Indoor hockey
- Founded: 2002; 24 years ago
- First season: 2002
- No. of teams: 5
- Confederation: PAHF (Americas)
- Most recent champion: United States (3rd title) (2024)
- Most titles: United States (3 titles)

The Women's Indoor Pan American Cup is an international women's indoor hockey competition organized by the Pan American Hockey Federation. The winning team becomes the champion of the Americas. The tournament serves as a qualification tournament for the Women's Indoor Hockey World Cup.

The tournament has been won by five different teams: the United States, Argentina and Canada all have won the tournament twice. Trinidad and Tobago and Cuba only have won one title. The most recent edition was held in Spring City, Pennsylvania, United States and was won by the United States.

== Results ==
| Year | Host | Final | | | Third place match | | | Number of teams |
| Year | Host | Winner | Score | Runner-up | Third place | Score | Fourth place | Number of teams |
|---|---|---|---|---|---|---|---|---|
| 2002; Details | Rockville, United States | Trinidad and Tobago | Round-robin | Mexico | United States | Round-robin | Venezuela | 4 |
| 2004; Details | Valencia, Venezuela | Cuba | Round-robin | Venezuela | Only two teams | | | 2 |
| 2005; Details | Kitchener, Canada | Canada | 2–1 | United States | Trinidad and Tobago | 8–0 | Venezuela | 4 |
| 2008; Details | San Juan, Argentina | Argentina | 4–2 | United States | Mexico | 1–0 | Peru | 6 |
| 2010; Details | Barquisimeto, Venezuela | Argentina | 0–0 (0–1 p.s.o.) | Uruguay | United States | 2–1 | Trinidad and Tobago | 8 |
| 2012 | Puerto Montt, Chile | Cancelled | | | Cancelled | | | |
| 2014; Details | Montevideo, Uruguay | Canada | 3–1 | Argentina | United States | 1–1 (2–1 p.s.o) | Uruguay | 4 |
| 2017; Details | Georgetown, Guyana | United States | 2–1 | Argentina | Uruguay | 3–2 | Canada | 7 |
| 2021; Details | Spring City, United States | United States | 3–0 | Canada | Argentina | 5–4 | Uruguay | 5 |
| 2024; Details | Calgary, Canada | United States | 5–5 (3–2 s.o.) | Argentina | Uruguay | 3–1 | Canada | 4 |

=== Successful national teams ===
| Team | Titles | Runners-up | Third places | Fourth places |
|---|---|---|---|---|
| United States | 3 (2017, 2021*, 2024) | 2 (2005, 2008) | 3 (2002*, 2010, 2014) | |
| Argentina | 2 (2008*, 2010) | 3 (2014, 2017, 2024) | 1 (2021) | |
| Canada | 2 (2005*,2014) | 1 (2021) | | 2 (2017, 2024) |
| Trinidad and Tobago | 1 (2002) | | 1 (2005) | 1 (2010) |
| Cuba | 1 (2004) | | | |
| Uruguay | | 1 (2010) | 2 (2017, 2024) | 2 (2014*, 2021) |
| Mexico | | 1 (2002) | 1 (2008) | |
| Venezuela | | 1 (2004*) | | 2 (2002, 2005) |
| Peru | | | | 1 (2008) |

* = host nation

=== Team appearances ===
| Team | (United States) 2002 | (Venezuela) 2004 | (Canada) 2005 | (Argentina) 2008 | (Venezuela) 2010 | (Uruguay) 2014 | (Guyana) 2017 | (United States) 2021 | (Canada) 2024 | Total |
|---|---|---|---|---|---|---|---|---|---|---|
| Argentina | – | – | – | 1st | 1st | 2nd | 2nd | 3rd | 2nd | 6 |
| Barbados | – | – | – | – | – | – | 7th | – | – | 1 |
| Canada | – | – | 1st | – | 5th | 1st | 4th | 2nd | 4th | 6 |
| Chile | – | – | – | 5th | 7th | – | – | – | – | 2 |
| Cuba | – | 1st | – | – | – | – | – | – | – | 1 |
| Guyana | – | – | – | – | – | – | 6th | 5th | – | 3 |
| Mexico | 2nd | – | – | 3rd | – | – | – | – | – | 2 |
| Paraguay | – | – | – | 6th | – | – | – | – | – | 1 |
| Peru | – | – | – | 4th | 8th | – | – | – | – | 2 |
| Trinidad and Tobago | 1st | – | 3rd | – | 4th | 5th | 5th | – | – | 5 |
| United States | 3rd | – | 2nd | 2nd | 3rd | 3rd | 1st | 1st | 1st | 8 |
| Uruguay | – | – | – | – | 2nd | 4th | 3rd | 4th | 3rd | 5 |
| Venezuela | 4th | 2nd | 4th | – | 6th | – | – | – | – | 4 |
| Total | 4 | 2 | 4 | 6 | 8 | 4 | 7 | 5 | 4 | |

== See also ==
- Men's Indoor Pan American Cup
- Women's Pan American Cup
