= 2010 Pan American Youth Championship (girls' field hockey) =

Tournament details
- Host country: Mexico
- City: Hermosillo
- Dates: 13 – 20 March 2010
- Teams: 8

Final positions
- Champions: Argentina (1st title)
- Runner-up: Canada
- Third place: United States

Tournament statistics
- Matches played: 20
- Goals scored: 149 (7.45 per match)
- Top scorer: 4 Players (see list below) (7 goals)

The 2010 Pan American Youth Championship was the first edition of the Pan American Youth Championship, an international field hockey competition held in Hermosillo, Mexico. The girls' field hockey tournament was help from 13 – 20 March 2010.

The tournament also served as a direct qualifier for the 2010 Summer Youth Olympics, with the winner qualifying.

== Qualified teams ==
- Argentina
- Bermuda
- Canada
- Chile
- Mexico
- Paraguay
- United States
- Uruguay

== Results ==
=== Preliminary round ===
==== Pool A ====
Pos	Team	Pld	W	D	L	GF	GA	GD	Pts	Qualification
1	Argentina	3	3	0	0	29	1	+28	9	Semi-finals
2	Canada	3	2	0	1	25	6	+19	6	Semi-finals
3	Mexico	3	1	0	2	3	25	−22	3	
4	Paraguay	3	0	0	3	0	25	−25	0	

Source: PAHF
Rules for classification: 1) points; 2) goal difference; 3) goals scored; 4) head-to-head result.

13 March 2010
12:05

Argentina	13–0	Mexico
Albertario 1', 21', 50', 67', 68', 70'; Bustos 14'; Habif 39'; Fernández 41'; Garraffo 43'; Gómez 48'; Mama 52'; Cabut 62'	Report

Umpires:
Emma Simmons (BER)
Ayanna McClean (TTO)

13 March 2010
14:05

Canada	12–0	Paraguay
Secco 7'; Cherold 13', 30'; McCawley 15', 44', 64'; Annable 25'; Plasteras 25'; Keglowitsch 32'; Haughn 41', 61'; McManus 67'	Report

Umpires:
Veronica Villafañe (ARG)
Stephanie Judefind (USA)

14 March 2010
12:05

Mexico	2–0	Paraguay
Ortíz 27', 45'	Report

Umpires:
Sofía Mora Forni (URU)
Gillian Batey (CAN)

14 March 2010
14:05

Canada	1–5	Argentina
McManus 11'	Report	Bustos 13', 33'; Garraffo 27'; Habif 45'; Álvarez 59'

Umpires:
Stephanie Judefind (USA)
Ayanna McClean (TTO)

16 March 2010
13:05

Argentina	11–0	Paraguay
Mama 7'; Habif 19'; Bustos 24', 45'; Fernández 28', 42', 64'; Gómez 29'; Álvarez 48'; De Iure 56', 61'	Report

Umpires:
Emma Simmons (BER)
Sofía Mora Forni (URU)

16 March 2010
15:05

Mexico	1–12	Canada
Ortíz 7'	Report	Plasteras 4', 19', 22', 63'; McManus 16'; Keglowitsch 21'; Hamilton 27', 58'; Annable 28', 39'; Secco 54'; Haughn 63'

Umpires:
Beatriz Mongelos (PAR)
Romina Costanzo (ARG)

==== Pool B ====
Pos	Team	Pld	W	D	L	GF	GA	GD	Pts	Qualification
1	Chile	3	2	0	1	19	3	+16	6	Semi-finals
2	United States	3	2	0	1	14	4	+10	6	Semi-finals
3	Uruguay	3	2	0	1	13	3	+10	6	
4	Bermuda	3	0	0	3	0	36	−36	0	

Source: PAHF
Rules for classification: 1) points; 2) goal difference; 3) goals scored; 4) head-to-head result.

13 March 2010
16:05

United States	11–0	Bermuda
Gerzabek 4', 30'; Evans 7', 57', 66'; Johnson 8'; Gebhart 9'; Bernardi 35', 60'; Boyce 68', 69'	Report

Umpires:
Beatriz Mongelos (PAR)
Romina Costanzo (ARG)

13 March 2010
18:05

Chile	0–3	Uruguay
	Report	Piazza 18', 43'; De María 36'

Umpires:
Gillian Batey (CAN)
Arely Castellanos (MEX)

14 March 2010
16:05

Chile	2–0	United States
Retamales 5'; Sanz 53'	Report

Umpires:
Emma Simmons (BER)
Veronica Villafañe (ARG)

14 March 2010
18:05

Bermuda	0–8	Uruguay
	Report	Viana 2'; Latour 15'; Piazza 22', 69'; Lucía 25'; Taborda 28', 38'; Dall'Orso 29'

Umpires:
Romina Costanzo (ARG)
Arely Castellanos (MEX)

16 March 2010
17:05

Bermuda	0–17	Chile
	Report	Venegas 3', 40', 45', 46', 55', 69'; García 14'; Khamis 29'; Arestizabel 32', 47', 57'; Retamales 43', 51', 62'; Tala 60'; Molinairi 64'; Filipek 70'

Umpires:
Stephanie Judefind (USA)
Gillian Batey (CAN)

16 March 2010
19:05

United States	3–2	Uruguay
Wold 5'; Evans 44'; Gebhart 56'	Report	Piazza 54'; Viana 64'

Umpires:
Ayanna McClean (TTO)
Veronica Villafañe (ARG)

=== Classification round ===
==== Fifth to eighth place classification ====
Crossover
18 March 2010
Mexico	10
Bermuda	1
18 March 2010
Uruguay	6
Paraguay	0

Fifth place
20 March 2010
Mexico	0
Uruguay	3
Seventh Place
20 March 2010
Bermuda	1 (1)
Paraguay (p.s.o)	1 (4)

===== Crossover =====
18 March 2010
11:35

Mexico	10–1	Bermuda
Ugalde 13'; Orozco 23', 46'; Salazar 28'; Gamboa 30'; Correa 33', 56'; Ortíz 42', 50'; Sámano 69'	Report	Masters 48'

Umpires:
Sofía Mori Forni (URU)
Beatriz Mongelos (USA)

18 March 2010
14:05

Uruguay	6–0	Paraguay
Dall'Orso 13'; Viana 31', 45'; Taborda 47'; López 59'; Piazza 67'	Report

Umpires:
Gillian Batey (CAN)
Romina Costanzo (PAR)

===== Seventh and eighth place =====
20 March 2010
09:05

Bermuda	1–1	Paraguay
Bardgett 28'	Report	Ruíz 5'
Penalties
Bardgett (penalty shoot-out missed); Chadderton (penalty shoot-out missed); Masters (penalty shoot-out scored)	1–4	(penalty shoot-out scored) Ruíz; (penalty shoot-out scored) Cardozo; (penalty shoot-out scored) Catebra; (penalty shoot-out scored) Cacace

Umpires:
Gillian Batey (CAN)
Romina Costanzo (PAR)

===== Fifth and sixth place =====
20 March 2010
11:35

Mexico	0–3	Uruguay
	Report	Latour 8', 21'; Piazza 53'

Umpires:
Ayanna McClean (TTO)
Beatriz Mongelos (PAR)

==== First to fourth place classification ====
Semi-finals
18 March 2010
Argentina	3
United States	1
18 March 2010
Chile	1
Canada	4

Final
20 March 2010
Argentina	6
Canada	1
Third Place
20 March 2010
United States	7
Chile	1

===== Semi-finals =====
18 March 2010
16:35

Chile	1–4	Canada
García 40'	Report	Plasteras 29', 36'; McManus 50'; Secco 59'

Umpires:
Stephanie Judefind (USA)
Veronicea Villafañe (USA)

18 March 2010
19:05

Argentina	3–1	United States
Bustos 8'; Mama 50'; Cedrés 51'	Report	Wold 22'

Umpires:
Arely Castellanos (MEX)
Ayanna McClean (TTO)

===== Third and fourth place =====
20 March 2010
14:05

United States	7–1	Chile
Page 8'; Johnson 14'; Beltrani 29'; Evans 32'; Fluharty 46', 55'; Gerzabek 60'	Report	Molinairi 54'

Umpires:
Emma Simmons (VER)
Veronicea Villafañe (USA)

===== Final =====
20 March 2010
16:35

Argentina	6–1	Canada
Leiva 13'; Bustos 13'; Broccoli 17'; Albertario 19'; Cedrés 35'; Garraffo 65'	Report	McManus 14'

Umpires:
Arely Castellanos (MEX)
Stephanie Judefind (USA)

== Statistics ==
=== Final standings ===
As per statistical convention in field hockey, matches decided in extra time are counted as wins and losses, while matches decided by penalty shoot-outs are counted as draws.

Pos	Team	Pld	W	D	L	GF	GA	GD	Pts	Final standing
1st place, gold medalist(s)	Argentina	5	5	0	0	38	3	+35	15	Gold Medal
2nd place, silver medalist(s)	Canada	5	3	0	2	30	13	+17	9	Silver Medal
3rd place, bronze medalist(s)	United States	5	3	0	2	22	8	+14	9	Bronze Medal
4	Chile	5	2	0	3	21	14	+7	6	Fourth place
5	Uruguay	5	4	0	1	22	3	+19	12	Eliminated in Group Stage
6	Mexico	5	2	0	3	13	29	−16	6	Eliminated in Group Stage
7	Paraguay	5	0	1	4	1	31	−30	1	Eliminated in Group Stage
8	Bermuda	5	0	1	4	2	47	−45	1	Eliminated in Group Stage

Source: FIH
