= Field hockey at the 2011 Pan American Games =

- Venue: Pan American Hockey Stadium
- Dates: October 19 – October 29
- Competitors: 256 from 8 nations

Field hockey at the 2011 Pan American Games in Guadalajara was held over an eleven-day period beginning on October 19 and culminating with the medal finals on October 28 and October 29. All games were played at the Pan American Hockey Stadium. Each team was allowed to enter a maximum of sixteen athletes. The winner of each tournament qualified to compete at the 2012 Summer Olympics in London, Great Britain.

Canada, Trinidad and Tobago and Barbados were drawn into the same group for both tournaments, as well as Cuba, Mexico and the United States. Only Argentina and Chile swapped groups.

== Medal summary ==
=== Medal table ===
Rank	Nation	Gold	Silver	Bronze	Total
1	Argentina	1	1	0	2
2	United States	1	0	0	1
3	Canada	0	1	0	1
4	Chile	0	0	2	2
Totals (4 entries)		2	2	2	6

=== Events ===
Event	Gold	Silver	Bronze
Men	Argentina; Juan Manuel Vivaldi; Ignacio Bergner; Matias Vila; Pedro Ibarra; Lucas Argento; Lucas Rey; Rodrigo Vila; Matías Paredes; Lucas Cammareri; Lucas Vila; Fernando Zylberberg; Juan Martin Lopez; Manuel Brunet; Federico Bermejillo; Agustín Mazzilli; Lucas Rossi	Canada; Philip Wright; Scott Tupper; Jesse Watson; Richard Hildreth; Ken Pereira; Keegan Pereira; Jagdish Gill; David Jameson; Rob Short; Adam Froese; Mark Pearson; Iain Smythe; Gabbar Singh; Matthew Guest; David Carter; Antoni Kindler	Chile; Mathias Anwandter; Andrés Fuenzalida; Jose Zirpel; Adrián Henríquez; Jaime Zarhi; Esteban Krainz; Juan Cristobal Rodriguez; Thomas Kannegiesser; Martin Hernan Rodriguez; Alexis Berczely; Sebastián Kapsch; Fernando Fernández; Fernando Binder; Raúl Garcés; Jan Christian Richter; Sven Richter
Women	United States; Kayla Bashore-Smedley; Michelle Cesan; Lauren Crandall; Rachel Dawson; Katelyn Falgowski; Melissa Gonzalez; Michelle Kasold; Claire Laubach; Caroline Nichols; Katie O'Donnell; Julia Reinprecht; Katie Reinprecht; Paige Selenski; Amy Swensen; Shannon Taylor; Michelle Vittese	Argentina; Laura Aladro; Luciana Aymar; Noel Barrionuevo; Silvina D'Elía; Soledad García; Rosario Luchetti; Sofía Maccari; Delfina Merino; Carla Rebecchi; Macarena Rodríguez; Rocío Sánchez Moccia; Mariela Scarone; Daniela Sruoga; Josefina Sruoga; Belén Succi; Victoria Zuloaga	Chile; Catalina Cabach; Camila Caram; Daniela Caram; María Fernández; Christine Fingerhuth; Carolina García; Daniela Infante; Denise Infante; Paula Infante; Josefina Khamis; Claudia Schüler; Catalina Thiermann; Manuela Urroz; Javiera Villagra; Sofia Walbaum; Michelle Wilson

== Competition format ==
Eight teams competed in both the men's and women's Pan American Games hockey tournaments with the competition consisting of two rounds. In the first round, teams were divided into two pools of four teams, and play followed round robin format with each of the teams playing all other teams in the pool once. Teams were awarded three points for a win, one point for a draw and zero points for a loss.

Following the completion of the pool games, teams placing first and second in each pool advanced to a single elimination round consisting of two semifinal games, and the bronze and gold medal games. Remaining teams competed in classification matches to determine their ranking in the tournament. During these matches, extra time of 7.5 minutes per half was played if teams were tied at the end of regulation time. During extra time, play followed golden goal rules with the first team to score declared the winner. If no goals were scored during extra time, a penalty stroke competition took place.

== Men ==
=== Participating nations ===
Pools were based on the current world rankings (January 4, 2011). Teams ranked 1, 4, 5 and 8 would be in Pool A, while teams ranked 2, 3, 6 and 7 would be in Pool B.

Pool A

- Barbados
- Canada
- Chile
- Trinidad and Tobago

Pool B

- Argentina
- Cuba
- Mexico
- United States

== Women ==
=== Participating nations ===
Pools were based on the current world rankings (January 4, 2011). Teams ranked 1, 4, 5 and 8 would be in Pool A, while teams ranked 2, 3, 6 and 7 would be in Pool B.

Pool A

- Argentina
- Barbados
- Canada
- Trinidad and Tobago

Pool B

- Chile
- Cuba
- Mexico
- United States

== Schedule ==
The competition will be spread out across ten days, with the men and women competing on alternating dates.

Preliminary round	Semifinals	M	Event finals

October	19th Wed	20th Thu	21st Fri	22nd Sat	23rd Sun	24th Mon	25th Tue	26th Wed	27th Thu	28th Fri	29th Sat	Gold medals
Men											M	1
Women										M		1
