= Lauren Crandall =

American field hockey player

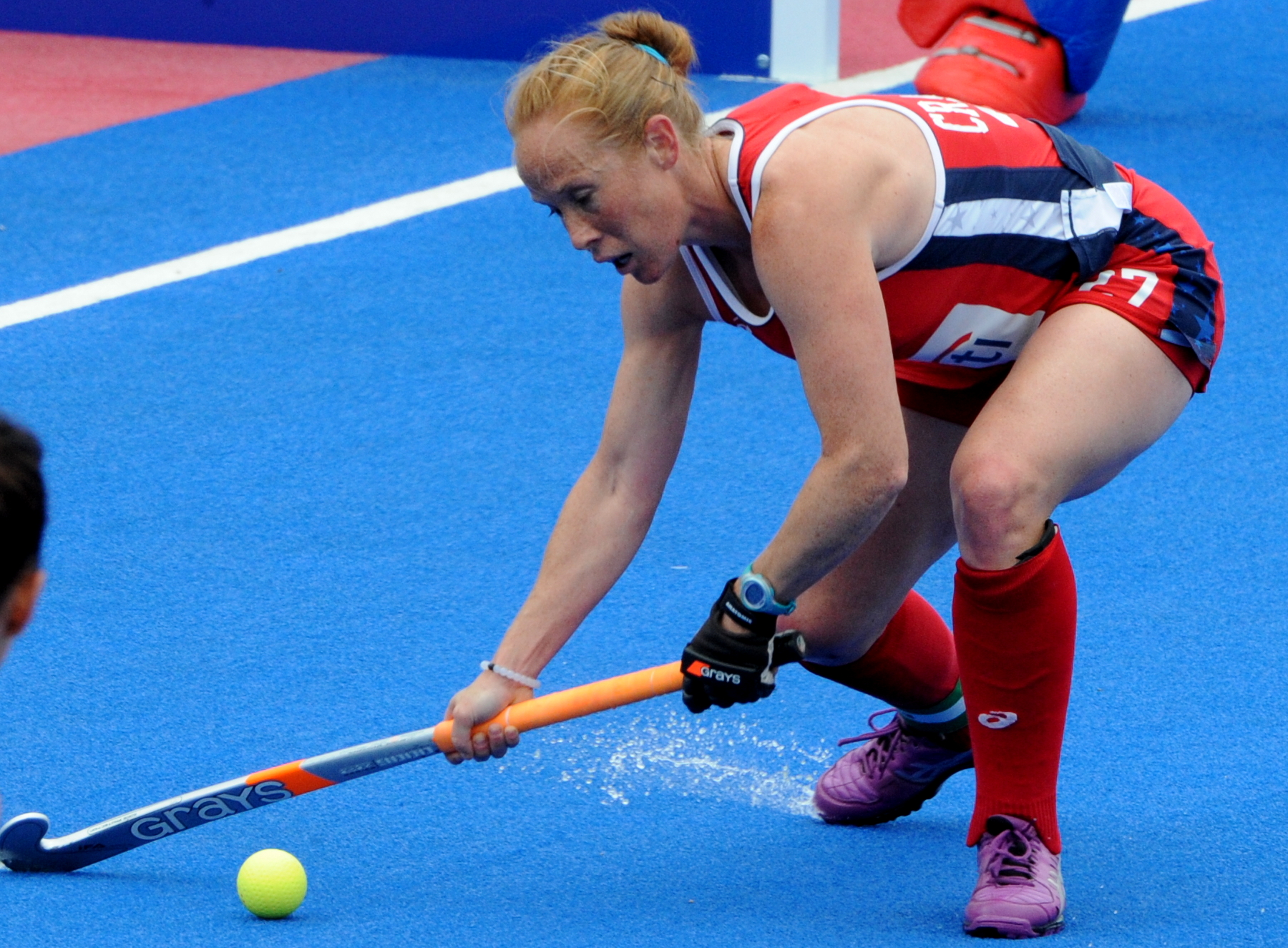
- Crandall in 2016

Personal information
- Born: March 17, 1985 (age 41) Pittsburgh, Pennsylvania

Sport
- Sport: Field hockey
- Position: Defender
National team
Years	Team	Caps	Goals
2005–2016	United States	279	-
Medal record
Women's field hockey
Representing United States
Pan American Games
Gold medal – first place	2011 Guadalajara	Team
Gold medal – first place	2015 Toronto	Team
Hockey Champions Trophy
Bronze medal – third place	2016 London	Team

Lauren Crandall (born March 17, 1985) is an American field hockey player. At the 2008, 2012, and 2016 Summer Olympics, she competed for the United States women's national field hockey team in the women's event, serving as team captain in 2012 and 2016. She played for the national team from 2005 through 2016. Before joining the national team she played field hockey for Wake Forest University, winning the NCAA field hockey championship twice.

== Early life ==
Crandall was born in Pittsburgh and grew up in Doylestown, Pennsylvania, with 3 siblings. She attended Holicong middle school from 1997 to 2000. She began playing field hockey in 1998. She began attending Central Bucks East High School in 1999, playing both field hockey and soccer for the school. Crandall was named team captain of the field hockey and soccer team two times for each sport. As a high school senior, her team won the Pennsylvania Interscholastic Athletic Association field hockey State Championship. That same year, Crandall was selected as an All-American player and named Southeastern Pennsylvania Field Hockey Player of the Year. She was named her school's top female athlete in 2003, the year she graduated.

== College ==
Crandall attended Wake Forest University, where she played on the field hockey team as a midfielder. She was named Division I All-American from 2004 to 2006. She was named team captain in 2005 and again in 2006. She was a Honda Award Finalist in 2006. During her time at Wake Forest, the team won the NCAA field hockey championship twice, in 2003 and 2004.

She graduated from Wake Forest in 2007 magna cum laude with a communication major and a minor in international studies. She went on to earn a graduate degree from DeVry University Keller Graduate School of Management.

== United States women's national field hockey team ==
As part of the USA Junior World team, she scored 10 goals in the 2005 World Cup, leading the team to its best ever finish of seventh place. Crandall joined the United States women's national field hockey team in 2005. She played defense for the team. A broken hand in 2006 forced Crandall to sit out the 2006 World Cup. The 2008 Summer Olympics in Beijing marked Crandall's Olympic debut. The team finished the Olympic tournament in 8th place. At the 2011 Pan American Games, the team won gold, defeating then reigning World Cup champions Argentina.

By 2012, Crandall was named team captain. The team finished a disappointed 12th place out of 12 teams at the 2012 Summer Olympics in London. Crandall scored a goal against Germany in the team's opening game. Having failed to qualify for the 2010 World Cup, the team finished fourth in the 2014 World Cup. Crandall was part of the US Team that repeated as gold medal champion at the 2015 Pan American games and won the bronze medal at the 2016 Champions Trophy. The team went into the 2016 Summer Olympics ranked fifth in the world, the highest ever ranking for the program. Crandall was again part of the U.S. team for the 2016 Summer Olympics in Rio de Janeiro, her third Olympic games with the team. The team placed 5th overall.

Over the course of her field hockey career, Crandall played 279 games with the Us National team. She announced her retirement in November 2016. Upon her retirement, US women's head coach Craig Parnham praised Crandall as an "international powerhouse." In June 2014, Crandall was inducted into the Holicong Hall of Fame.
