= 2012 Women's Pan-Am Junior Championship =

Field hockey tournament

Women's Junior Pan-Am Championship

Tournament details
- Host country: Mexico
- City: Guadalajara
- Dates: 10–23 September
- Teams: 11 (from 1 confederation)
- Venue: Estadio Panamericano de Hockey

Final positions
- Champions: Argentina (6th title)
- Runner-up: Canada
- Third place: United States

Tournament statistics
- Matches played: 36
- Goals scored: 203 (5.64 per match)
- Top scorer: (Chile) Manuela Urroz (10 goals)
- Best player: (Argentina) Florencia Habif
- Best goalkeeper: (Argentina) Sofia Belin Monserrat

The 2012 Women's Junior Pan-Am Championship was the 7th edition of the Women's Pan American Junior Championship. It was held from 10 – 23 September 2012 in Guadalajara, Mexico.

The tournament served as a qualifier for the 2013 Women's Hockey Junior World Cup, held in Mönchengladbach, Germany in July/August 2013.

Argentina won the tournament for the 6th time, defeating Canada 2–1 in the final. The United States won the bronze medal by defeating Chile 2–1 in the third and fourth place playoff.

== Officials ==
The following are the umpires appointed by the Pan American Hockey Federation to officiate the tournament.

- Mercedes Sanchez (ARG)
- Luciana Suarez (ARG)
- Victoria Villafañe (ARG)
- Emma Simmons (BER)
- Megan Robertson (CAN)
- Camila Cabargas (CHI)
- Arely Castellanos (MEX)
- Catalina Montesino Wenzel (MEX)
- Ana K. Vasquez Escalante (MEX)
- Amber Church (NZL)
- Lisa Marcano (TTO)
- Ayanna McClean (TTO)
- Mary Driscoll (USA)
- Suzzie Sutton (USA)
- Mercedes Coates (URU)

== Participating nations ==
- Argentina
- Brazil
- Canada
- Chile
- Jamaica
- Mexico (host nation)
- Paraguay
- Trinidad and Tobago
- United States
- Uruguay
- Venezuela

== Results ==
=== Preliminary round ===
==== Pool A ====
Pos	Team	Pld	W	D	L	GF	GA	GD	Pts	Qualification
1	Argentina	4	4	0	0	28	1	+27	12	Semi-finals
2	Canada	4	2	1	1	14	8	+6	7	Semi-finals
3	Uruguay	4	2	1	1	12	6	+6	7	
4	Mexico	4	1	0	3	3	16	−13	3	
5	Brazil	4	0	0	4	0	26	−26	0	

Source: PAHF
Rules for classification: 1) points; 2) goal difference; 3) goals scored; 4) head-to-head result.

10 September 2012
10:45

Canada	7–0	Brazil
Karringten 6', 25'; Secco 22'; Buttinger 30'; Stewart 39'; Kristen 43'; Raye 68'	Report

Umpires:
Mercedes Coates (URU)
Victoria Villafañe (ARG)

10 September 2012
12:30

Mexico	0–3	Uruguay
	Report	Villar 37'; Vilar del Valle 54'; Lamberti 69'

Umpires:
Catalina Montesino Wenzel (CHI)
Emma Simmons (BER)

11 September 2012
10:45

Argentina	10–0	Brazil
Juárez 10', 37'; F. Habif 40'; Correa 42', 45'; Acosta 55', 62'; Cedrés 65'; Zapulla 66'; Villarroya 69'	Report

Umpires:
Lisa Hernandez (TTO)
Megan Robertson (CAN)

11 September 2012
17:45

Canada	2–2	Uruguay
Secco 22', 70'	Report	Stanley 19'; De María 46'

Umpires:
Amber Church (NZL)
Arely Castellanos (MEX)

12 September 2012
17:45

Mexico	0–8	Argentina
	Report	Gomes Fantasia 7', 59'; Albertario 19', 46'; Zapulla 22'; Correa 55'; Bustos 64'; Juárez 66'

Umpires:
Megan Robertson (CAN)
Camila Cabargas (CHI)

13 September 2012
12:30

Uruguay	6–0	Brazil
Stanley 11', 42'; Vilar del Valle 12'; Kliche 21'; Taborda 53'; Algorta 60'	Report

Umpires:
Catalina Montesino Wenzel (CHI)
Arely Castellanos (MEX)

14 September 2012
17:45

Canada	0–6	Argentina
	Report	Juárez 7'; Romang 10', 18'; Correa 13'; Zapulla 36'; Albertario 48'

Umpires:
Ayanna McClean (TTO)
Suzzie Sutton (USA)

14 September 2012
19:30

Brazil	0–3	Mexico
	Report	Sanchez Revilla 37'; Salazar Miranda 47'; Morales Vazquez 54'

Umpires:
Lisa Hernandez (TTO)
Camila Cabargas (CHI)

16 September 2012
12:30

Argentina	4–1	Uruguay
Zapulla 4'; Gomes Fantasia 43'; Juárez 54'; Villarroya 62'	Report	Vilar del Valle 62'

Umpires:
Ayanna McClean (TTO)
Suzzie Sutton (USA)

16 September 2012
16:00

Mexico	0–5	Canada
	Report	Karringten 17', 47', 52', 57'; Buttinger 53'

Umpires:
Amber Church (NZL)
Catalina Montesino Wenzel (CHI)

==== Pool B ====
Pos	Team	Pld	W	D	L	GF	GA	GD	Pts	Qualification
1	Chile	5	5	0	0	39	3	+36	15	Semi-finals
2	United States	5	4	0	1	35	3	+32	12	Semi-finals
3	Venezuela	5	3	0	2	10	23	−13	9	
4	Trinidad and Tobago	5	1	0	4	10	23	−13	3	
5	Paraguay	5	1	0	4	5	24	−19	3	
6	Jamaica	5	1	0	4	2	25	−23	3	

Source: PAHF
Rules for classification: 1) points; 2) goal difference; 3) goals scored; 4) head-to-head result.

10 September 2012
16:00

United States	9–0	Venezuela
Parsley 2', 30'; Kirby 6', 58'; Chillano 15'; Bozek 18', 64'; Morris 37'; Johnson 44'	Report

Umpires:
Amber Church (NZL)
Camila Cabargas (CHI)

10 September 2012
17:45

Chile	9–0	Paraguay
Flores 11', 26'; Khamis 22', 47'; Urroz 34', 57'; Vidaurre 45'; MacKenna 49'; Krimerman 68'	Report

Umpires:
Suzi Sutton (USA)
Ana K. Vasquez Escalante (MEX)

11 September 2012
09:00

Trinidad and Tobago	3–0	Jamaica
O'Brien 24'; Govia 42' de Gannes 57'	Report

Umpires:
Mary Driscoll (USA)
Emma Simmons (BER)

11 September 2012
19:30

United States	8–0	Paraguay
Bozek 10', 49'; Parsley 20', 29', 66'; Morris 23'; Harbin 43'; Gerzabek 59'	Report

Umpires:
Luciana Suarez (ARG)
Ayanna McClean (TTO)

12 September 2012
09:00

Chile	10–0	Jamaica
Vidaurre 10'; Urroz 17', 70'; C. Salas 32', 66'; MacKenna 35', 43'; Flores 60'; J. Salas 63'; Tala 67'	Report

Umpires:
Luciana Suarez (ARG)
Mercedes Coates (URU)

12 September 2012
10:45

Venezuela	3–2	Trinidad and Tobago
Gonzalez 3'; Mujica 21'; Padrón 24'	Report	Govia 26'; Henry 48'

Umpires:
Ana K. Vasquez Escalante (MEX)
Mary Driscoll (USA)

13 September 2012
14:15

Venezuela	1–11	Chile
Gonzalez 27'	Report	Krimerman 3'; Khamis 14', 42', 67'; MacKenna 16', 37'; Urroz 43', 66'; Venegas 58'; Vidaurre 60'; Flores 69'

Umpires:
Veronica Villafañe (ARG)
Suzi Sutton (USA)

14 September 2012
09:00

Jamaica	2–0	Paraguay
Knight 50'; Nicholson 70'	Report

Umpires:
Luciana Suarez (ARG)
Emma Simmons (BER)

14 September 2012
10:45

Trinidad and Tobago	1–9	United States
de Gannes 22'	Report	Beltrani 9'; Fulharty 25', 32'; Parsley 27'; Chillano 37'; Johnson 39'; Morris 42', 48', 55'

Umpires:
Ana K. Vasquez Escalante (MEX)
Amber Church (NZL)

15 September 2012
09:00

Jamaica	0–4	Venezuela
	Report	Rodriguez 5'; Padrón 21'; Mujica 35'; Sánchez 68'

Umpires:
Mary Driscoll (USA)
Catalina Montesino Wenzel (CHI)

15 September 2012
10:45

Chile	2–1	United States
Urroz 41', 62'	Report	Harbin 60'

Umpires:
Veronica Villafañe (ARG)
Megan Robertson (CAN)

16 September 2012
10:45

Paraguay	4–3	Trinidad and Tobago
Servian Giosa 4', 40', 55'; Cardozo Servin 5'	Report	Hingh 13', 33'; Govia 19'

Umpires:
Camila Cabargas (CHI)
Arely Castellanos (MEX)

17 September 2012
10:45

United States	8–0	Jamaica
Wold 5', 23'; Beltrani 8'; Morris 11'; Malmberg 27'; McEvoy 33'; Chillano 45'; Harbin 70+'	Report

Umpires:
Emma Simmons (BER)
Mercedes Coates (URU)

17 September 2012
12:30

Paraguay	1–2	Venezuela
Servian Giosa 59'	Report	Sánchez 51', 55'

Umpires:
Luciana Suarez (ARG)
Lisa Hernandez (TTO)

17 September 2012
14:15

Trinidad and Tobago	1–7	Chile
Govia 57'	Report	Urroz 7', 43'; Flores 6', 70'; Venegas 37', 48'; Khamis 52'

Umpires:
Mary Driscoll (USA)
Ana K. Vasquez Escalante (MEX)

=== Classification round ===
==== Ninth to eleventh place classification ====
Crossover 1
18 September 2012
Paraguay (a.e.t)	1
Brazil	0

Crossover 2
20 September 2012
Brazil	1
Jamaica	2

Tenth Place
21 September 2012
Paraguay	3
Jamaica	0

===== Crossover =====
18 September 2012
12:45

Paraguay	1–0 (a.e.t.)	Brazil
Servian 84'	Report

Umpires:
Arely Castellanos (MEX)
Mercedes Coates (URU)

20 September 2012
10:45

Brazil	1–2	Jamaica
De Aguiar 40'	Report	Knight 13'; Airey 34'

Umpires:
Ana Vázquez Escalante (MEX)
Luciana Suárez (ARG)

===== Ninth and tenth place =====
21 September 2012
10:45

Paraguay	3–0	Jamaica
Servian 8', 41'; Romero 58'	Report

Umpires:
Mercedes Coates (URU)
Emma Simmons (BER)

==== Fifth to eighth place classification ====
Crossover
19 September
Uruguay	5
Trinidad and Tobago	1
18 September
Venezuela (a.e.t)	3
Mexico	2

Fifth place
21 September
Uruguay	9
Venezuela	0
Seventh Place
21 September
Trinidad and Tobago	0
Mexico	2

===== Crossover =====
18 September 2012
15:45

Venezuela	3–2 (a.e.t.)	Mexico
González 5'; Beltrán 33'; Sánchez 81'	Report	T. Salazar 3'; Gutiérrez 64'

Umpires:
Lisa Hernández (TTO)
Mary Driscoll (USA)

19 September 2012
10:45

Uruguay	5–1	Trinidad and Tobago
Taborda 11', 24'; Carvalho 7'; Norbis 34'; Dall'Orso 51'	Report	Govia 48'

Umpires:
Ana Vázquez Escalante (MEX)
Suzi Sutton (USA)

===== Seventh and eighth place =====
21 September 2012
12:45

Trinidad and Tobago	0–2	Mexico
	Report	J. Salazar 27'; Correa 61'

Umpires:
Mary Dricscoll (USA)
Luciana Suárez (ARG)

===== Fifth and sixth place =====
21 September 2012
18:15

Uruguay	9–0	Venezuela
Taborda 4', 13', 33'; Dall'Orso 10'; Lamberti 18', 50'; Vilar del Valle 59', 61'; Norbis 60'	Report

Umpires:
Megan Robertson (CAN)
Arely Castellanos (MEX)

==== First to fourth place classification ====
Semi-Finals
19 September
Argentina	6
United States	0
19 September
Chile	1
Canada	3

Final
22 September
Argentina	2
Canada	1
Third Place
22 September
United States	2
Chile	1

===== Semi-finals =====
19 September 2012
12:45

Chile	1–3	Canada
Khamis 18'	Report	Stewart 13'; Buttinger 37'; Karringten 56'

Umpires:
Ayanna McClean (TTO)
Victoria Villafañe (ARG)

19 September 2012
20:00

Argentina	6–0	United States
Villarroya 4'; Gomes Fantasia 8'; Werthein 20'; Juárez 31'; Romang 38'; Albertario 59'	Report

Umpires:
Amber Church (NZL)
Megan Robertson (CAN)

===== Third and fourth place =====
22 September 2012
17:00

United States	2–1	Chile
Parsley 19', 64'	Report	Vidaurre 33'

Umpires:
Amber Church (NZL)
Victoria Villafañe (ARG)

===== Final =====
22 September 2012
19:00

Argentina	2–1	Canada
Gomes Fantasia 43', 54'	Report	Johansen 66'

Umpires:
Suzzie Sutton (USA)
Ayanna McClean (TTO)

== Statistics ==
=== Final standings ===
Pos	Team	Pld	W	D	L	GF	GA	GD	Pts	Qualification
1st place, gold medalist(s)	Argentina	6	6	0	0	36	2	+34	18	Qualified to 2013 FIH Junior World Cup
2nd place, silver medalist(s)	Canada	6	3	1	2	18	11	+7	10	Qualified to 2013 FIH Junior World Cup
3rd place, bronze medalist(s)	United States	7	5	0	2	37	10	+27	15	Qualified to 2013 FIH Junior World Cup
4	Chile	7	5	0	2	41	8	+33	15	
5	Uruguay	6	4	1	1	26	7	+19	13	
6	Venezuela	7	4	0	3	13	34	−21	12	
7	Mexico	6	2	0	4	7	19	−12	6	
8	Trinidad and Tobago	7	1	0	6	11	30	−19	3	
9	Paraguay	7	3	0	4	9	24	−15	9	
10	Jamaica	7	2	0	5	4	29	−25	6	
11	Brazil	6	0	0	6	1	29	−28	0	

Source: PAHF

=== Goalscorers ===
There were 203 goals scored in 36 matches, for an average of 5.64 goals per match.

10 goals

- (Chile) Manuela Urroz

8 goals

- (United States) Nicole Parsley

7 goals

- (Canada) Caashia Karringten
- (Chile) Josefina Khamis
- (Paraguay) María Servian

6 goals

- (Argentina) Julia Gomes Fantasia
- (Argentina) Gisele Juárez
- (Chile) Fernanda Flores
- (United States) Heather Morris
- (Uruguay) Agustina Taborda

5 goals

- (Chile) María José MacKenna
- (Trinidad and Tobago) Brianna Govia
- (Uruguay) Manuela Vilar del Valle

4 goals

- (Argentina) Agustina Albertario
- (Argentina) María Correa
- (Argentina) Florencia Zapulla
- (Chile) Francisca Vidaurre
- (United States) Emma Bozek
- (Venezuela) Johandri Sánchez

3 goals

- (Argentina) Pilar Romang
- (Argentina) Sofía Villaroya
- (Canada) Jessica Buttinger
- (Canada) Madeline Secco
- (Chile) Agustina Venegas
- (United States) Alyssa Chillano
- (United States) Kelsey Harbin
- (Uruguay) Lucía Lamberti
- (Uruguay) Janine Stanley
- (Venezuela) Stephanie González

2 goals

- (Argentina) Julieta Acosta
- (Canada) Holly Stewart
- (Chile) Denise Krimerman
- (Chile) Catalina Salas
- (Jamaica) Trudy-Ann Knight
- (Mexico) Jazel Salazar
- (Trinidad and Tobago) Dana de Gannes
- (Trinidad and Tobago) Brittney Hingh
- (United States) Abby Beltrani
- (United States) Maxine Fulharty
- (United States) Aileen Johnson
- (United States) Sydney Kirby
- (United States) Emily Wold
- (Uruguay) Kaisuami Dall'Orso
- (Uruguay) Florencia Norbis
- (Venezuela) Patrícia Mujíca
- (Venezuela) Esther Padrón

1 goal

- (Argentina) Fatima Bustos
- (Argentina) Jimena Cedrés
- (Argentina) Florencia Habif
- (Argentina) Roberta Werthein
- (Brazil) Camila de Aguiar
- (Canada) Karli Johansen
- (Canada) Ashley Kristen
- (Canada) Abigail Raye
- (Chile) Josefa Salas
- (Chile) Francisca Tala
- (Jamaica) Chakira Airey
- (Jamaica) Demi Nicholson
- (Mexico) María Correa
- (Mexico) Karen Gutiérrez
- (Mexico) Aleexis Morales
- (Mexico) Jazel Salazar
- (Mexico) Jéssica Sánchez
- (Paraguay) Andrea Cardozo
- (Paraguay) Ivanna Romero
- (Trinidad and Tobago) Zene Henry
- (Trinidad and Tobago) Kelli O'Brien
- (United States) Katherine Gerzabek
- (United States) Marta Malmberg
- (United States) Alison McEvoy
- (Uruguay) Milagros Algorta
- (Uruguay) Paula Carvalho
- (Uruguay) Matilde Kliche
- (Uruguay) Camila de María
- (Uruguay) Soledad Villar
- (Venezuela) Lady Beltrán
- (Venezuela) Mery Rodríguez
