= 2016 Hockey Champions Trophy =

2016 Hockey Champions Trophy may refer to:

- 2016 Men's Hockey Champions Trophy
- 2016 Women's Hockey Champions Trophy
