= Field hockey at the 2011 Pan American Games – Men's tournament =

Men's field hockey at the 2011 Pan American Games
- Field hockey

Tournament details
- Host country: Mexico
- City: Guadalajara
- Dates: 20–29 October
- Teams: 8 (from 1 confederation)
- Venue: Estadio Panamericano de Hockey

Final positions
- Champions: Argentina (8th title)
- Runner-up: Canada
- Third place: Chile

Tournament statistics
- Matches played: 20
- Goals scored: 136 (6.8 per match)
- Top scorer(s): (Mexico) Francisco Montoya (Argentina) Ignacio Bergner (Canada) Scott Tupper (9 goals)

The men's field hockey tournament at the 2011 Pan American Games was held in Guadalajara, Mexico at the Pan American Hockey Stadium from October 20–29.

Argentina won their eighth gold medal by defeating the defending champions Canada 3–1 in the final. Chile won the bronze medal by defeating Cuba 4–3.

== Qualification ==
A National Olympic Committee may enter one men's team for the field hockey competition. Mexico, the host nation along with seven other countries qualified through regional competitions.

Dates	Event	Location	Quotas	Qualified
Host nation			1	Mexico
3–11 April 2010	2010 South American Championship	Rio de Janeiro, Brazil	2	Argentina; Chile
22–31 July 2010	2010 Central American and Caribbean Games	Caguas, Puerto Rico	2	Trinidad and Tobago; Barbados
7–15 March 2009	2009 Pan American Cup	Santiago, Chile	2	Canada; United States
3–6 February 2011	Qualifier for 2011 Pan American Games	Rio de Janeiro, Brazil	1	Cuba
Total			8	

- Cuba played a three match series against the men's country that would have qualified as the eighth country (Brazil, who finished in the third qualifying position from the 2009 Pan American Cup), as Cuba did not enter the Central American and Caribbean Games.

== Pools ==
Pools were based on the current world rankings (January 4, 2011). Teams ranked 1, 4, 5 and 8 would be in Pool A, while teams ranked 2, 3, 6 and 7 would be in Pool B.

Pool A	Pool B
Canada (10); Chile (25); Trinidad and Tobago (29); Barbados (58)	Argentina (11); United States (20); Mexico (31); Cuba (45)

== Umpires ==
Twelve officials were appointed by Pan American Hockey Federation to officiate matches.

- John Wright (RSA)
- Lim Hong Zhen (SIN)
- Diego Barbas (ARG)
- Jamar Springer (BAR)
- Chris Wilson (CAN)
- Martín Vatter (CHI)
- Daniel López Ramos (URU)
- Arturo Vázquez Serrano (MEX)
- Grant Hundley (USA)
- Constantine Soteriades (USA)
- Maximiliano Scala (ARG)
- Devin Hooper (GUY)

== Competition format ==
Eight teams competed in both the men's and women's Pan American Games hockey tournaments with the competition consisting of two rounds. In the first round, teams were divided into two pools of four teams, and play followed round robin format with each of the teams playing all other teams in the pool once. Teams were awarded three points for a win, one point for a draw and zero points for a loss.

Following the completion of the pool games, teams placing first and second in each pool advanced to a single elimination round consisting of two semifinal games, and the bronze and gold medal games. Remaining teams competed in classification matches to determine their ranking in the tournament. During these matches, extra time of 7½ minutes per half was played if teams were tied at the end of regulation time. During extra time, play followed golden goal rules with the first team to score declared the winner. If no goals were scored during extra time, a penalty stroke competition took place.

== Results ==
All times are Central Daylight Time (UTC−5)

=== Preliminary round ===
==== Pool A ====
Pos	Team	Pld	W	D	L	GF	GA	GD	Pts	Qualification
1	Canada	3	3	0	0	21	2	+19	9	Semi-finals
2	Chile	3	2	0	1	12	6	+6	6	Semi-finals
3	Trinidad and Tobago	3	1	0	2	14	11	+3	3	
4	Barbados	3	0	0	3	2	30	−28	0	

Source: PAHF

20 October 2011
09:00

Canada	7–2	Trinidad and Tobago
Guest 2', 37', 46'; Tupper 26'; Smythe 29', 30'; Wright 62'	Report	Scipio 1'; Browne 35'

Umpires:
Constantine Soteriades (USA)
Diego Barbas (ARG)

20 October 2011
11:00

Chile	9–1	Barbados
J. Richter 3', 13', 22', 50'; Rodríguez 8'; Krainz 51', 67'; S. Richter 53'; Berczely 68'	Report	Forde 42'

Umpires:
Maximiliano Scala (ARG)
Arturo Vazquez Serrano (MEX)

22 October 2011
14:00

Trinidad and Tobago	11–1	Barbados
Browne 3', 16'; Pierre 6', 36'; Chan 23', 68'; Scipio 27', 42'; Whittington 37' de Gannes 39'; Toussaint 60'	Report	Holder 9'

Umpires:
Grant Hundley (USA)
Devin Hooper (GUY)

22 October 2011
16:00

Chile	0–4	Canada
	Report	Tupper 15', 49', 56'; Short 61'

Umpires:
Daniel Lopez Ramos (URU)
Diego Barbas (ARG)

24 October 2011
09:00

Canada	10–0	Barbados
Froese 3'; Pereira 7'; Guest 10', 16', 62'; Tupper 25', 35', 46'; Pearson 49'; Short 54'	Report

Umpires:
Constantine Soteriades (USA)
Maximiliano Scala (ARG)

24 October 2011
11:00

Trinidad and Tobago	1–3	Chile
Whittington 36'	Report	J. Richter 15'; S. Richter 51'; Rodríguez 65'

Umpires:
Grant Hundley (USA)
John Wright (RSA)

==== Pool B ====
Pos	Team	Pld	W	D	L	GF	GA	GD	Pts	Qualification
1	Argentina	3	3	0	0	20	1	+19	9	Semi-finals
2	Cuba	3	2	0	1	7	13	−6	6	Semi-finals
3	Mexico (H)	3	1	0	2	4	12	−8	3	
4	United States	3	0	0	3	4	9	−5	0	

Source: PAHF
(H) Hosts

20 October 2011
14:00

Argentina	8–0	Mexico
Paredes 4', 53'; Cammareri 29'; Bergner 35', 48', 51'; L. Vila 52'; López 58'	Report

Umpires:
Chris Wilson (CAN)
Daniel Lopez Ramos (URU)

20 October 2011
16:00

United States	2–4	Cuba
Holt 35+', 38'	Report	Sardut Gomez 19', 49'; Blanco Hernandez 53'; Perez Perez 56'

Umpires:
John Wright (RSA)
Lim Hong Zhen (SIN)

22 October 2011
09:00

Mexico	1–2	Cuba
Aguilar Montoya 53'	Report	Valero Camejo 61'; Sardut Gomez 63'

Umpires:
Jamar Springer (BAR)
Martin Vatter (CHI)

22 October 2011
11:00

United States	0–2	Argentina
	Report	Bergner 34'; López 52'

Umpires:
Chris Wilson (CAN)
John Wright (RSA)

24 October 2011
02:00

Argentina	10–1	Cuba
Bergner 23', 27', 34'; Ibarra 25', 50', 62', 63'; Rossi 37'; R. Vila 67'; M. Vila 69'	Report	Blanco Hernandez 13'

Umpires:
Martin Vatter (CHI)
Lim Hong Zhen (SIN)

24 October 2011
16:00

Mexico	3–2	United States
Aguilar Montoya 7'; Aguayo Olguin 18'; Campillo Lopez 20'	Report	Dijxhoorn 3'; Barber 29'

Umpires:
Devin Hooper (GUY)
Daniel Lopez Ramos (URU)

=== Fifth to eighth place classification ===
5–8th place semi-finals
27 October
Mexico	10
Barbados	0
27 October
Trinidad and Tobago	0
United States	2

Fifth place
29 October
Mexico	0
United States	6
Seventh place
29 October
Barbados	1
Trinidad and Tobago	9

==== 5–8th place semi-finals ====
27 October 2011
17:30

Mexico	10–0	Barbados
Aguilar Montoya 16', 22', 40', 42', 45', 49', 56'; Rios Benitez 20'; Aguayo Olguin 46'; Galvan Nieves 66'	Report

Umpires:
Davin Hooper (GUY)
Constantine Soteriades (USA)

27 October 2011
19:30

Trinidad and Tobago	0–2	United States
	Report	Sundeen 33', 63'

Umpires:
Jamar Springer (BAR)
Maximiliano Scala (ARG)

==== Seventh and eighth place ====
29 October 2011
09:00

Barbados	1–9	Trinidad and Tobago
Small 45'	Report	Toussaint 8', 20', 52', 67', 69'; Scipio 13', 39', 68'; Browne 16'

Umpires:
Daniel Lopez Ramos (URU)
Arturo Vazquez Serrano (MEX)

==== Fifth and sixth place ====
29 October 2011
11:30

Mexico	0–6	United States
	Report	Holt 2', 43'; Runzi 12'; Sundeen 29'; Martin 45'; Harris 64'

Umpires:
Maximiliano Scala (ARG)
Lim Hong Zhen (SIN)

=== Medal round ===
Semi-finals
27 October
Canada	3
Cuba	2
27 October
Argentina	7
Chile	1

Gold medal match
29 October
Canada	1
Argentina	3
Bronze medal match
29 October
Cuba	3
Chile	4

==== Semi-finals ====
27 October 2011
11:30

Canada	3–2	Cuba
Guest 1'; Tupper 6'; Singh 21'	Report	Blanco Hernandez 14'; Lemus Dominguez 49'

Umpires:
Grant Hundley (USA)
Diego Barbas (ARG)

27 October 2011
15:00

Argentina	7–1	Chile
Bergner 7'; L. Vila 27', 65'; Rey 33'; Ibarra 34'; M. Vila 49', 69'	Report	Berczely 60'

Umpires:
Chris Wilson (CAN)
Lim Hong Zhen (SIN)

==== Bronze medal match ====
29 October 2011
15:00

Cuba	3–4	Chile
Sarduy Gomez 9'; Blanco Hernandez 52', 55'	Report	Zarhi 19'; Zirpel 23'; Richter 32'; Berczely 69'

Umpires:
Diego Barbas (ARG)
Constantine Soteriades (USA)

==== Gold medal match ====
29 October 2011
17:30

Canada	1–3	Argentina
Tupper 25'	Report	Bergner 45'; Ibarra 49'; L. Vila 53'

Umpires:
John Wright (RSA)
Grant Hundley (USA)

== Final standings ==
1. Argentina
2. Canada
3. Chile
4. Cuba
5. United States
6. Mexico
7. Trinidad and Tobago
8. Barbados

== Medalists ==
Event	Gold	Silver	Bronze
Men	Argentina; Juan Manuel Vivaldi; Ignacio Bergner; Matías Vila; Pedro Ibarra; Lucas Argento; Lucas Rey; Rodrigo Vila; Matías Paredes; Lucas Cammareri; Lucas Vila; Fernando Zylberberg; Juan Martín López; Manuel Brunet; Federico Bermejillo; Agustín Mazzilli; Lucas Rossi	Canada; Philip Wright; Scott Tupper; Jesse Watson; Richard Hildreth; Ken Pereira; Keegan Pereira; Jagdish Gill; David Jameson; Rob Short; Adam Froese; Mark Pearson; Iain Smythe; Gabbar Singh; Matthew Guests; David Carter; Antoni Kindler	Chile; Mathias Anwandter; Andrés Fuenzalida; Jose Zirpel; Adrián Henríquez; Jaime Zarhi; Esteban Krainz; Juan Cristobal Rodriguez; Thomas Kannegiesser; Martín Rodríguez; Alexis Berczely; Sebastián Kapsch; Fernando Fernández; Fernando Binder; Raúl Garcés; Jan Christian Richter; Sven Richter
