= Field hockey at the 2011 Pan American Games – Men's Qualifier =

2011 Pan American Games Men's Field Hockey Qualifier
Tournament details
- Host country: Brazil
- City: Rio de Janeiro
- Teams: 2 (from 1 confederation)
- Venue(s): Deodoro Hockey Complex

Final positions
- Champions: Cuba
- Runner-up: Brazil

Tournament statistics
- Matches played: 3
- Goals scored: 27 (9 per match)

The Men's Field Hockey Qualifier for the 2011 Pan American Games was a field hockey series between Cuba and Brazil to determine the last entry into the field hockey competition at the 2011 Pan American Games for men. All games were played in Rio de Janeiro, Brazil from February 3–6, 2011.

This series became necessary because Cuba decided to skip the 2010 Central American and Caribbean Games. Brazil would have qualified under the old qualifying system (third qualifying position from the 2009 Pan American Cup).

== Results ==
=== Pool A ===
Pos	Team	Pld	W	D	L	GF	GA	GD	Pts	Qualification
1	Cuba	3	3	0	0	24	3	+21	9	2011 Pan American Games
2	Brazil (H)	3	0	0	3	3	24	−21	0	

Source: PAHF
(H) Hosts

3 February 2011
12:00

Brazil	1 – 7	Cuba
	Report

5 February 2011
12:00

Brazil	1 – 8	Cuba
	Report

6 February 2011
12:00

Brazil	1 – 9	Cuba
	Report

== See also ==
- Field hockey at the 2011 Pan American Games – Women's Qualifier
