= Denise Rojas =

Chilean field hockey player (born 1995)

Denise Rojas Losada
Personal information
- Full name: Denise Rojas Losada
- Born: 4 July 1995 (age 31) Argentina

Sport
- Sport: Field hockey
- Position: Defender
- Club: Universidad Católica
Senior career
Years	Team	Caps	Goals
–2022	Universidad Católica	-	-
2022–2024	HTHC	-	-
2024–	Universidad Católica	-	-
National team
Years	Team	Caps	Goals
2012–2016	Chile U21	19	(11)
2013–	Chile	193	(64)
Medal record
Women's field hockey
Representing Chile
Pan American Games
Bronze medal – third place	2023 Santiago	Team
Pan American Cup
Silver medal – second place	2017 Lancaster
Silver medal – second place	2022 Santiago
FIH Nations Cup
Bronze medal – third place	2023–24 Terrassa	Team
Bronze medal – third place	2024–25 Santiago	Team
South American Games
Silver medal – second place	2014 Santiago	Team
Bronze medal – third place	2018 Cochabamba	Team

Denise Rojas Losada (née Krimerman) is an Argentine born field hockey player from Chile.

== Career ==
=== Club hockey ===
A player of Universidad Católica, Rojas joined German club Harvestehuder THC in 2022.

She returned to Universidad Católica in 2024.

=== National team ===
Rojas has represented Chile at both junior and senior levels. She made her junior debut at the 2012 Pan-Am Junior Championship, and her senior debut one year later at the 2013 South American Championship.

Rojas was instrumental in Chile's success at the 2017 Pan American Cup. She scored 2 goals in her team's historic semi-final victory over the United States, including the winner in the last minute. The team ultimately lost to Argentina 4–1 in the final.

Following the Pan American Cup, Rojas was named the captain of the 2017 Pan American Elite Team by the Pan American Hockey Federation.

== Personal life ==
Rojas was born on 4 July 1995 in Argentina, to an Argentine mother and Chilean father. She moved to Santiago, Chile, when she was two years old.

She is a former student of the Universidad del Desarrollo.
