= Field hockey at the 2011 Pan American Games – Women's tournament =

Women's field hockey at the 2011 Pan American Games
Tournament details
- Host country: Mexico
- City: Guadalajara
- Teams: 8
- Venue: Estadio Panamericano de Hockey

Final positions
- Champions: United States (1st title)
- Runner-up: Argentina
- Third place: Chile

Tournament statistics
- Matches played: 20
- Goals scored: 122 (6.1 per match)
- Top scorer: (Argentina) Noel Barrionuevo (10 goals)

The women's field hockey tournament at the 2011 Pan American Games was held between 19–28 October 2011 in Guadalajara, Mexico. The tournament doubled as the qualification to the 2012 Summer Olympics to be held in London, Great Britain.

The United States won the tournament after defeating Argentina 4–2 in the final, obtaining their first title and ending Argentina's streak of six consecutive titles since the women's tournament was included in the Pan American Games in 1987.

== Qualification ==
Every country in the Pan American Hockey Federation had the opportunity to qualify through a regional tournament except the two North American countries as they did not participate in them. Taking that into consideration, it was decided to allow two teams not already qualified through regional tournaments to qualify for the Pan American Games based on final rankings in the 2009 Pan American Cup. Along with the automatically qualified host nation, the eighth participating country was decided in a three test-match series between Cuba (who did not participate in the 2010 Central American and Caribbean Games) and Jamaica (who would have qualified in the third qualifying position from the 2009 Pan American Cup)

Date	Event	Location	Quotas	Qualifier(s)
Host nation			1	Mexico
3–11 April 2010	2010 South American Championship	Rio de Janeiro, Brazil	2	Argentina; Chile
22–30 July 2010	2010 Central American and Caribbean Games	Mayagüez, Puerto Rico	2	Trinidad and Tobago; Barbados
28–31 October 2010	Qualifier	Kingston, Jamaica	1	Cuba
7–15 February 2009	2009 Pan American Cup	Hamilton, Bermuda	2	United States; Canada
Total			8	

== Competition format ==
Eight teams competed in both the men's and women's Pan American Games hockey tournaments with the competition consisting of two rounds. In the first round, teams were divided into two pools of four teams, and play followed round robin format with each of the teams playing all other teams in the pool once. Teams were awarded three points for a win, one point for a draw and zero points for a loss.

Following the completion of the pool games, teams placing first and second in each pool advanced to a single elimination round consisting of two semifinal games, and the bronze and gold medal games. Remaining teams competed in classification matches to determine their ranking in the tournament. During these matches, extra time of 7½ minutes per half was played if teams were tied at the end of regulation time. During extra time, play followed golden goal rules with the first team to score declared the winner. If no goals were scored during extra time, a penalty stroke competition took place.

== Umpires ==
Below are the 12 umpires appointed by the Pan American Hockey Federation:

- Arely Castellanos (MEX)
- Cheng Hong (TPE)
- Carolina de la Fuente (ARG)
- Kelly Hudson (NZL)
- Stephanie Judefind (USA)
- Ayanna McClean (TTO)
- Carol Metchette (IRL)
- Catalina Montesino Wenzel (CHI)
- Maritza Pérez Castro (URU)
- Wendy Stewart (CAN)
- Suzzane Sutton (USA)
- Carolina Villafañe (ARG)

== Results ==
All times are Central Daylight Time (UTC−05:00)

=== First round ===
==== Pool A ====
Team	Pld	W	D	L	GF	GA	GD	Pts
Argentina (A)	3	3	0	0	37	3	+34	9
Canada (A)	3	2	0	1	15	8	+7	6
Barbados	3	1	0	2	4	31	−27	3
Trinidad and Tobago	3	0	0	3	3	17	−14	0

(A) Advanced to the semifinals

19 October 2011
09:00

Argentina	11–0	Trinidad and Tobago
García 2', 22'; Rebecchi 6', 61'; Luchetti 14'; Barrionuevo 21', 37', 39', 58'; Merino 29', 65'	Report

Umpires:
Carol Metchette (IRL)
Suzzane Sutton (USA)

19 October 2011
11:00

Canada	10–0	Barbados
Stairs 5', 26', 45'; Baker 16'; Culley 20', 68'; Gillis 30'; Haughn 31'; Roemer 37'; Raye 61'	Report

Umpires:
Stephanie Judefind (USA)
Maritza Pérez Castro(URU)

21 October 2011
14:00

Trinidad and Tobago	2–4	Barbados
Thompson 17'; Quesnay 37'	Report	King 9'; Clarke 15'; Warner 32'; Sealy 61'

Umpires:
Arely Castellanos (MEX)
Cheng Hong (TPE)

21 October 2011
16:00

Canada	3–7	Argentina
Culley 6'; Haughn 30'; Gillis 35'	Report	García 15', 25'; Aymar 16', 23'; Barrionuevo 41', 53'; Rebecchi 63'

Umpires:
Carol Metchette (IRL)
Catalina Montesino Wenzel (CHI)

23 October 2011
09:00

Argentina	19–0	Barbados
Rebecchi 2', 24', 53'; Aymar 4', 19', 61'; Barrionuevo 13', 65'; Merino 15'; J. Sruoga 20'; Sánchez Moccia 22'; García 23', 48', 50', 58'; Luchetti 31', 62'; D'Elía 42'; Maccari 56'	Report

Umpires:
Suzzane Sutton (USA)
Catalina Montesino Wenzel (CHI)

23 October 2011
11:00

Trinidad and Tobago	1–2	Canada
Quesnay 7'	Report	Stairs 61'; Wright 68'

Umpires:
Stephanie Judefind (USA)
Arely Castellanos (MEX)

==== Pool B ====
Team	Pld	W	D	L	GF	GA	GD	Pts
United States (A)	3	3	0	0	16	1	+15	9
Chile (A)	3	2	0	1	8	2	+6	6
Cuba	3	1	0	2	3	16	−13	3
Mexico	3	0	0	3	1	9	−8	0

(A) Advanced to the semifinals

19 October 2011
14:00

United States	5–0	Mexico
Reinprecht 9', 11'; Taylor 31'; Laubach 37'; O'Donnell 52'	Report

Umpires:
Wendy Stewart (CAN)
Verónica Villafañe (ARG)

19 October 2011
16:00

Chile	6–0	Cuba
Urroz 5'; Fernández 16'; De. Infante 23'; Villagra 41', 56'; Fingerhuth 58'	Report

Umpires:
Carolina de la Fuente (ARG)
Ayanna McClean (TRI)

21 October 2011
09:00

Mexico	1–3	Cuba
Navarro 70'	Report	Vera 4', 13'; Sierra 61'

Umpires:
Kelly Hudson (NZL)
Ayanna McClean (TRI)

21 October 2011
11:00

Chile	1–2	United States
C. Caram 46'	Report	Taylor 41'; Nichols 42'

Umpires:
Carolina de la Fuente (ARG)
Maritza Pérez Castro (URU)

23 October 2011
14:00

United States	9–0	Cuba
O'Donnell 2', 44'; Laubach 15', 17'; Nichols 21', 33'; Falgowski 26'; Kasold 46'; Selenski 55'	Report

Umpires:
Kelly Hudson (NZL)
Verónica Villafañe (ARG)

23 October 2011
16:00

Mexico	0–1	Chile
	Report	Khamis 63'

Umpires:
Wendy Stewart (CAN)
Cheng Hong(TPE)

=== Classification ===
Crossover
26 October 2011
Barbados	1
Mexico	3
26 October 2011
Cuba	2
Trinidad & Tobago	1

Fifth place
28 October 2011
Cuba	3
Mexico	2
Seventh place
28 October 2011
Barbados	1
Trinidad & Tobago	3

==== Crossover ====
26 October 2011
09:00

Barbados	1–3	Mexico
King 13'	Report	Navarro 38'; Castillo 42'; Martinez 64'

Umpires:
Ayanna McClean (TRI)
Suzzane Sutton (USA)

26 October 2011
17:30

Cuba	2–1	Trinidad and Tobago
Carmenate 32'; Argentel 62'	Report	Wynne 8'

Umpires:
Carol Metchette (IRL)
Arely Castellanos (MEX)

==== Seventh and eighth place ====
28 October 2011
09:00

Barbados	1–3	Trinidad and Tobago
Warner 25'	Report	Wynne 24', 33'; Thompson 29'

Umpires:
Catalina Montesino Wenzel (CHI)
Chenge Hong (TPE)

==== Fifth and sixth place ====
28 October 2011
11:30

Cuba	3–2	Mexico
Vera 28'; Sierra 35', 65'	Report	Navarro 23', 45'

Umpires:
Stephanie Judefind (USA)
Verónica Villafañe (ARG)

=== Medal round ===
Semi-finals
26 October 2011
Argentina	4
Chile	0
26 October 2011
United States	4
Canada	2

Final
28 October 2011
Argentina	2
United States	4
Third place
28 October 2011
Chile	3
Canada	0

==== Semi-finals ====
26 October 2011
11:00

Argentina	4–0	Chile
Luchetti 5'; García 22'; Aymar 47'; Merino 56'	Report

Umpires:
Wendy Stewart (CAN)
Kelly Hudson (NZL)

26 October 2011
15:00

United States	4–2	Canada
Laubach 9', 43'; Cesan 21'; Kasold 58'	Report	Stairs 7', 45'

Umpires:
Carolina de la Fuente (ARG)
Maritza Pérez Castro (URU)

==== Bronze medal match ====
28 October 2011
15:00

Chile	3–0	Canada
Urroz 27'; D. Caram 42'; De. Infante 67'	Report

Umpires:
Carolina de la Fuente (ARG)
Kelly Hudson (NZL)

==== Gold medal match ====
28 October 2011
17:30

Argentina	2–4	United States
Barrionuevo 19', 42'	Report	Selenski 14'; Taylor 16'; O'Donnell 35'; Vittese 66'

Umpires:
Carol Metchette (IRL)
Wendy Stewart (CAN)

Team details

Argentina
United States

GK	28	Belén Succi		(substituted off) 36'
DF	5	Macarena Rodríguez
DF	21	Mariela Scarone
DF	25	Silvina D'Elia	35
DF	27	Noel Barrionuevo
MF	4	Rosario Luchetti
MF	8	Luciana Aymar
MF	19	Sofía Maccari
MF	18	Daniela Sruoga
FW	10	Soledad García
FW	11	Carla Rebecchi
Substitutions:
GK	13	Laura Aladro		(substituted on) 36'
FW	12	Delfina Merino		(substituted on) 15'
MF	17	Rocío Sánchez Moccia		(substituted on) 16'
FW	30	Josefina Sruoga		(substituted on) 53'
Manager:
(Argentina) Lucía Caride

GK	31	Jackie Kintzer
DF	8	Rachel Dawson
DF	12	Julia Reinprecht
DF	21	Claire Laubach
DF	26	Kayla Bashore
DF	27	Lauren Crandall (c)	26'
MF	9	Michelle Vittese
MF	14	Katie Reinprecht
MF	18	Michelle Kasold	(yellow card) 47'
FW	16	Katie O'Donnell
FW	20	Paige Selenski
Substitutions:
MF	5	Melissa González		(substituted on) 8'
MF	7	Jesse Gey		(substituted on) 6'
FW	10	Michelle Cesan		(substituted on) 7'
FW	11	Shannon Taylor		(substituted on) 5'
DF	19	Caroline Nichols		(substituted on) 6'
Manager:
(Australia) Lee Bodimeade

== Final standings ==
As per statistical convention in field hockey, matches decided in extra time are counted as wins and losses, while matches decided by penalty shoot-outs are counted as draws.

Pos	Team	Pld	W	D	L	GF	GA	GD	Pts	Status
1st place, gold medalist(s)	United States	5	5	0	0	24	5	+19	15	Qualified for 2012 Summer Olympics
2nd place, silver medalist(s)	Argentina	5	4	0	1	43	7	+36	12	
3rd place, bronze medalist(s)	Chile	5	3	0	2	11	6	+5	9	
4	Canada	5	2	0	3	17	15	+2	6	
5	Cuba	5	3	0	2	8	19	−11	9	
6	Mexico	5	1	0	4	6	13	−7	3	
7	Trinidad and Tobago	5	1	0	4	7	20	−13	3	
8	Barbados	5	1	0	4	6	37	−31	3	

Source: PAHF

== Goalscorers ==
There were 122 goals scored in 20 matches, for an average of 6.1 goals per match.

10 goals

- (Argentina) Noel Barrionuevo

9 goals

- (Argentina) Soledad García

6 goals

- (Argentina) Luciana Aymar
- (Argentina) Carla Rebecchi
- (Canada) Brienne Stairs

5 goals

- (United States) Claire Laubach

4 goals

- (Argentina) Rosario Luchetti
- (Argentina) Delfina Merino
- (Mexico) Michel Navarro
- (United States) Kathleen O'Donnell

3 goals

- (Canada) Thea Culley
- (Canada) Katherine Gillis
- (Cuba) Marisbel Sierra
- (Cuba) Yuraima Vera
- (Trinidad and Tobago) Blair Wynne
- (United States) Caroline Nichols
- (United States) Shannon Taylor

2 goals

- (Barbados) Cher King
- (Barbados) Charlia Warner
- (Canada) Hannah Haughn
- (Chile) Denise Infante
- (Chile) Manuela Urroz
- (Chile) Javiera Villagra
- (Trinidad and Tobago) Arielle Ramchand-Du Quesnay
- (Trinidad and Tobago) Kristin Thompson
- (United States) Michelle Kasold
- (United States) Katherine Reinprecht
- (United States) Paige Selenski

1 goal

- (Argentina) Silvina D'Elía
- (Argentina) Sofía Maccari
- (Argentina) Rocío Sánchez Moccia
- (Argentina) Josefina Sruoga
- (Barbados) Dionne Clarke
- (Barbados) Maria Sealy
- (Canada) Katie Baker
- (Canada) Abigail Raye
- (Canada) Diana Roemer
- (Chile) Camila Caram
- (Chile) Daniela Caram
- (Chile) María José Fernández
- (Chile) Christine Fingerhuth
- (Chile) Josefina Khamis
- (Cuba) Odeliasi Carmenate
- (Cuba) Mileysis Argentel
- (Mexico) Jesús Castillo
- (Mexico) Guadalupe Martínez
- (United States) Michelle Cesan
- (United States) Katelyn Falgowski
- (United States) Michelle Vittese

== Medalists ==
Event	Gold	Silver	Bronze
Women	United States; Kayla Bashore-Smedley; Michelle Cesan; Lauren Crandall; Rachel Dawson; Katelyn Falgowski; Melissa Gonzalez; Michelle Kasold; Claire Laubach; Caroline Nichols; Katie O'Donnell; Julia Reinprecht; Katie Reinprecht; Paige Selenski; Amy Swensen; Shannon Taylor; Michelle Vittese	Argentina; Laura Aladro; Luciana Aymar; Noel Barrionuevo; Silvina D'Elia; Soledad García; Rosario Luchetti; Sofía Maccari; Delfina Merino; Carla Rebecchi; Macarena Rodríguez; Rocío Sánchez Moccia; Mariela Scarone; Daniela Sruoga; María Josefina Sruoga; Belén Succi; Victoria Zuloaga	Chile; Catalina Cabach; Camila Caram; Daniela Caram; María Fernández; Christine Fingerhuth; Carolina García; Daniela Infante; Denise Infante; Paula Infante; Josefina Khamis; Claudia Schüler; Catalina Thiermann; Manuela Urroz; Javiera Villagra; Sofia Walbaum; Michelle Wilson
