= Jimena Cedrés =

Argentine field hockey player

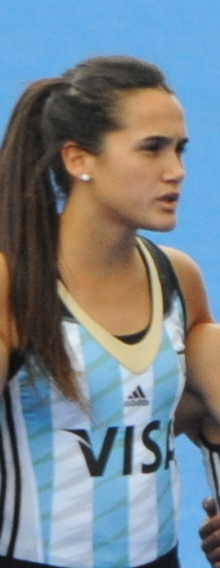
- Jimena Cedrés in 2016

Personal information
- Full name: María Jimena Cedrés
- Born: 12 January 1993 (age 33) Buenos Aires, Argentina

Sport
- Sport: Field hockey
- Position: Midfielder
- Club: Dragons
Senior career
Years	Team	Caps	Goals
???–2016	San Fernando	-	-
2016–2018	HC Rotterdam	-	-
2018–2020	Oranje-Rood	-	-
2020–present	Dragons	-	-
National team
Years	Team	Caps	Goals
2009–2010	Argentina U17		-
2011–2013	Argentina U21		-
2010–2016, 2020-	Argentina	96	-
Medal record
Women's field hockey
Representing Argentina
World Cup
Silver medal – second place	2022 Terrassa/Amstelveen
World League
Gold medal – first place	2014-15 Rosario
Champions Trophy
Gold medal – first place	2014 Mendoza
Gold medal – first place	2016 London
Pan American Games
Silver medal – second place	2015 Toronto	Team
Pan American Cup
Gold medal – first place	2022 Santiago
Junior World Cup
Silver medal – second place	2013 Mönchengladbach
Pan American Junior Championship
Gold medal – first place	2012 Guadalajara
Youth Olympic Games
Silver medal – second place	2010 Singapore	Team
- Updated on 12 February 2022

María Jimena Cedrés Lobbosco (born 30 April 1992) is an Argentine field hockey player. At the 2014 Champions Trophy she won her first gold medal with the Argentina national team in an international tournament. Jimena also won the 2014–2015 World League and the 2016 Champions Trophy.
