= Giselle Juárez =

Giselle Juárez may refer to:

- Giselle Juárez (field hockey)
- Giselle Juarez (softball)
