= Field hockey at the 2010 Summer Youth Olympics – Girls' tournament =

2010 Summer Youth Olympics
Tournament details
- Host country: Singapore
- City: Singapore
- Dates: 16–24 August
- Teams: 6
- Venue: Sengkang Hockey Stadium

Final positions
- Champions: Netherlands (1st title)
- Runner-up: Argentina
- Third place: New Zealand

Tournament statistics
- Matches played: 18
- Goals scored: 82 (4.56 per match)
- Top scorer: (New Zealand) Rhiannon Dennison (7 goals)

Field hockey tournament at the 2010 Summer Youth Olympics was held at the Sengkang Hockey Stadium in Sengkang New Town, Singapore. Netherlands won the gold by defeating Argentina in the final.

== Medalists ==
Gold	Silver	Bronze
Netherlands	Argentina	New Zealand

== Round-robin ==
Pos	Team	Pld	W	D	L	GF	GA	GD	Pts	Qualification
1	Argentina	5	4	1	0	17	3	+14	13	Gold medal match
2	Netherlands	5	3	2	0	21	5	+16	11	Gold medal match
3	New Zealand	5	3	0	2	10	6	+4	9	Bronze medal match
4	South Korea	5	2	1	2	11	12	−1	7	Bronze medal match
5	Ireland	5	1	0	4	6	12	−6	3	
6	South Africa	5	0	0	5	1	28	−27	0	

Source: FIH
Rules for classification: 1) points; 2) goal difference; 3) goals scored; 4) head-to-head result.

16 August 2010
16:00

Netherlands	3–1	Ireland
Plokker 22'; Broek 43'; Derkx 63'		Beatty 42'

Umpires:
Hannah Sanders (GBR)
Sarah Bennett (ZIM)

16 August 2010
18:00

Argentina	7–0	South Africa
Álvarez 18'; Garraffo 23', 64'; Bustos 31', 46'; Albertario 34'; Fernández 39'	Report

Umpires:
Chen Hong (CHN)
Miskarmalia Mohd Ariffin (SIN)

16 August 2010
20:00

New Zealand	3–2	South Korea
Curtis 56'; Dalziel 58', 61'	Report	Baek 28'; Nam 47'

Umpires:
Ayanna McClean (TRI)
Maritza Perez Castro (URU)

17 August 2010
16:30

Netherlands	13–0	South Africa
Derkx 7', 17', 41'; Dell'Anna 14'; Van Wijk 24', 32', 35'; Hotting 44', 50'; De Ruiter 51'; Broek 55', 58'; De Lange 63'	Report

Umpires:
Angela Street (AUS)
Ayanna McClean (IRI)

17 August 2010
18:30

Ireland	2–3	New Zealand
Mullan 22'; Barry 66'	Report	Dennison 7', 64'; Millner 69'

Umpires:
Maritza Perez Castro (URU)
Chen Hong (CHN)

17 August 2010
20:00

South Korea	1–4	Argentina
Baek Ee-seul 52'	Report	Albertario 29'; Habif 35'; Fernández 49'; Álvarez 61'

Umpires:
Hannah Sanders (GBR)
Celine Martin-Schmets (BEL)

19 August 2010
16:00

South Korea	3–1	South Africa
Nam 8'; Kim S. 21'; Park J. 32'	Report	Jubb 58'

Umpires:
Sarah Bennett (ZIM)
Maritza Perez Castro (URU)

19 August 2010
18:00

Ireland	0–3	Argentina
	Report	Álvarez 25'; Broccoli 44'; Garraffo 70'

Umpires:
Angela Street (AUS)
Celine Martin-Schmets (BEL)

19 August 2010
20:00

Netherlands	1–0	New Zealand
Keetels 59'	Report

Umpires:
Hannah Sanders (GBR)
Miskarmalia Mohd Ariffin (SIN)

20 August 2010
16:30

South Korea	3–2	Ireland
Lee Y. 10', 30'; Kim S. 69'	Report	Brown 11'; Orr 16'

Umpires:
Ayanna McClean (TRI)
Miskarmalia Mohd Ariffin (SIN)

20 August 2010
18:00

South Africa	0–4	New Zealand
	Report	Dennison 17', 37'; Curtis 23', 25'

Umpires:
Sarah Bennett (ZIM)
Maritza Perez Castro (URU)

20 August 2010
20:00

Argentina	2–2	Netherlands
Garraffo 1'; Álvarez 55'	Report	Dell'Anna 57'; Broek 70'

Umpires:
Angela Street (AUS)
Chen Hong (CHN)

22 August 2010
16:00

New Zealand	0–1	Argentina
	Report	Broccoli 61'

Umpires:
Angela Street (AUS)
Hannah Sanders (GBR)

22 August 2010
18:00

Netherlands	2–2	South Korea
Derkx 39', 44'	Report	Choi 46'; Nam 67'

Umpires:
Chen Hong (CHN)
Miskarmalia Mohd Ariffin (SIN)

22 August 2010
20:00

South Africa	0–1	Ireland
	Report	McKee 27'

Umpires:
Celine Martin-Schmets (BEL)
Ayanna McClean (TRI)

=== Classification ===
==== Fifth place match ====
24 August 2010
15:00

Ireland	3–1	South Africa
Mullan 5', 15'; Ewart 56'	Report	Jubb 21'

Umpires:
Miskarmalia Mohd Ariffin (SIN)
Ayanna McLean (TRI)

== Bronze medal match ==
24 August 2010
17:30

(bronze) New Zealand	5–4 (a.e.t.)	South Korea
Dennison 15', 17', 47'; McCaw 25'; Curtis 73'	Report	Park E. 6'; Kang 58', 69'; Nam 63'

Umpires:
Hannah Sanders (GBR)
Chen Hong (CHN)

== Gold medal match ==
24 August 2010
20:00

(silver) Argentina	1–2 (a.e.t.)	Netherlands (gold)
Albertario 24'	Report	Van Wijk 47', 78'

Umpires:
Angela Street (GBR)
Maritza Perez Castro (URU)

== Goalscorers ==
There have been 82 goals scored in 18 matches, for an average of 4.56 goals per match.

7 goals

- (New Zealand) Rhiannon Dennison

6 goals

- (Netherlands) Frederique Derkx

5 goals

- (Netherlands) Lieke van Wijk

4 goals

- (Argentina) Agustina Álvarez
- (Argentina) Eugenia Garraffo
- (Netherlands) Roos Broek
- (New Zealand) Michaela Curtis
- (South Korea) Nam So-ri

3 goals

- (Argentina) Agustina Albertario
- (Ireland) Kathryn Mullan

2 goals

- (Argentina) Rocío Broccoli
- (Argentina) Camila Bustos
- (Argentina) Sol Fernández
- (Netherlands) Lara Dell'anna
- (Netherlands) Mathilde Hotting
- (New Zealand) Samara Dalziel
- (South Africa) Jacinta Jubb
- (South Korea) Baek Ee-seul
- (South Korea) Kang Ji-na
- (South Korea) Kim Sol
- (South Korea) Lee Yu-ri

1 goal

- (Argentina) Florencia Habif
- (Ireland) Rebecca Barry
- (Ireland) Emily Beatty
- (Ireland) Chloe Brown
- (Ireland) Leah Ewart
- (Ireland) Lucy Mckee
- (Ireland) Joanne Orr
- (Netherlands) Macey de Ruiter
- (Netherlands) Marloes Keetels
- (Netherlands) Floortje Plokker
- (Netherlands) Lisanne de Lange
- (New Zealand) Elley Miller
- (New Zealand) Kate McCaw
- (South Korea) Choi Su-ji
- (South Korea) Park Eun-jung
- (South Korea) Park Ju-hui

Source: FIH
