= Florencia Habif =

Argentine field hockey player

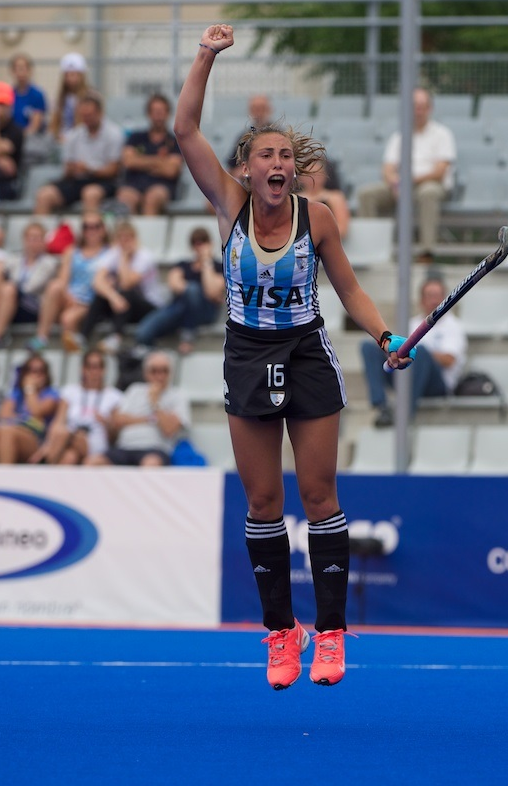

Personal information
- Full name: Florencia Martina Habif
- Born: 22 August 1993 (age 32) Buenos Aires, Argentina
- Height: 1.61 m (5 ft 3 in)
- Weight: 55 kg (121 lb)

Sport
- Sport: Field hockey
- Position: Midfielder
- Club: Mannheimer HC
Senior career
Years	Team	Caps	Goals
1997–2015	GEBA	-	-
2015–2016	Pinoké	-	-
2016–	Mannheimer HC	-	-
National team
Years	Team	Caps	Goals
2009–2010	Argentina U17		-
2011–2013	Argentina U21		-
2010–2019	Argentina	192	(21)
Medal record
Women's field hockey
Representing Argentina
Olympic Games
Silver medal – second place	2012 London	Team
World Cup
Bronze medal – third place	2014 The Hague
World League
Gold medal – first place	2014-15 Rosario
Champions Trophy
Gold medal – first place	2012 Rosario
Gold medal – first place	2014 Mendoza
Gold medal – first place	2016 London
Silver medal – second place	2011 Amsterdam
Bronze medal – third place	2018 Changzhou
Pan American Games
Silver medal – second place	2015 Toronto	Team
Pan American Cup
Gold medal – first place	2013 Mendoza
Gold medal – first place	2017 Lancaster
Junior World Cup
Silver medal – second place	2013 Mönchengladbach
Pan American Junior Championship
Gold medal – first place	2012 Guadalajara
Youth Olympic Games
Silver medal – second place	2010 Singapore	Team

Florencia Martina Habif (born 22 August 1993) is an Argentine field hockey player. Being part of Argentina's junior national team "Las Leoncitas" ("The Baby Lionesses") since 2009 and of the national team Las Leonas ("The Lionesses") since 2010, she has competed in several tournaments, including the 2012 Summer Olympics in London, where the team achieved the silver medal, being the team's youngest player. In 2014, she was named the Best Young Player in the world by the International Hockey Federation and has been nominated 4 times.

Florencia is also a player in the club Gimnasia y Esgrima de Buenos Aires (GEBA) since she was 4 years old. Habif is part of the so-called New Generation of Argentina's Women's Field Hockey.

== Sports career ==
Florencia started to play field hockey at GEBA and then joined Argentina's junior national team at the age of 17, achieving the gold medal at the 2010 Pan American Youth Championship Tournament in Montevideo, Uruguay, then qualifying and earning the silver medal at the 2010 Summer Youth Olympics in Singapore.

With the senior national team, Florencia earned three Champions Trophy, the World League 2014-15, the bronze medal at the 2014 World Cup and two Pan American Cups.

She played in the Visa International Invitational Hockey Tournament at London before her first Olympic Games at the age of 19 at the 2012 Summer Olympics in London.

== Sponsorship ==
=== Ritual ===
Florencia is sponsored by Ritual Hockey, joining many other top athletes from around the world.

=== Nike ===
Florencia Habif is provided with Nike clothes.

=== Red Bull ===
Habif is also sponsored by Red Bull along with some of the best athletes from Argentina and the world.

== Awards ==
- Player of the Tournament at the 2012 Pan American Junior Championship held at Guadalajara, Mexico.
- Revelación de Oro (Gold Revelation) on 2012, at the Fiesta del Deporte ("Party of the Sports") sponsored by Clarín, one of Argentina's main newspapers, due to her performance with the National Team.
- Nominated to the Terna Olímpica 2012 at the Premios Olimpia, an award organized by the Círculo de Periodistas de Buenos Aires (Circle of Journalists of Buenos Aires).
- 2014 - FIH Young Women Player of the Year.
