= 2016 Women's Hockey Champions Trophy =

Tournament details
- Host country: United Kingdom
- City: London
- Dates: 18–26 June
- Teams: 6
- Venue: Lee Valley Hockey and Tennis Centre

Final positions
- Champions: Argentina (7th title)
- Runner-up: Netherlands
- Third place: United States

Tournament statistics
- Matches played: 18
- Goals scored: 70 (3.89 per match)
- Top scorer: (Argentina) Carla Rebecchi (7 goals)
- Best player: (Argentina) Carla Rebecchi
- Best goalkeeper: (Netherlands) Joyce Sombroek

The 2016 Women's Hockey Champions Trophy was the 22nd edition of the Hockey Champions Trophy for women. It was held between 18 and 26 June 2016 in London, United Kingdom.

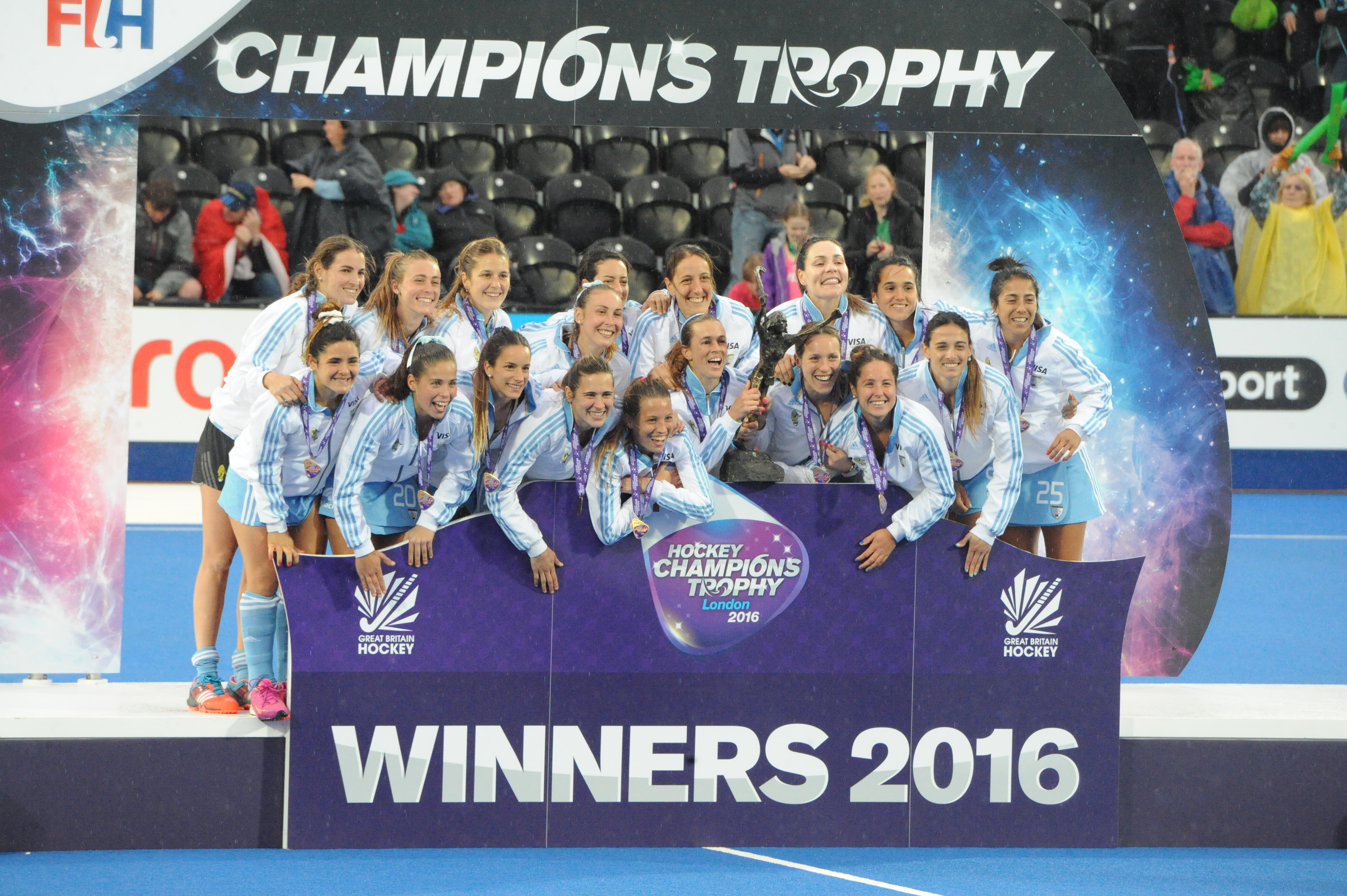
Argentina, champions

Argentina won the tournament for a record seventh time after defeating the Netherlands 2–1 in the final.

== Format ==
After three editions with two different formats, it was decided to go back to the same one used until the 2010 edition which consisted of a six-team, round robin tournament.

== Qualification ==
A change in the qualification process was decided, similar to the one used until 2010. Alongside the host nation, the last Olympic, World Cup and World League champions qualify automatically as well as the winner of the 2014 Champions Challenge I. The remaining spot will be nominated by the FIH Executive Board, making a total of 6 competing teams. If teams qualify under more than once criteria, the additional teams will be invited by the FIH Executive Board as well.

- Great Britain (Host nation)
- Netherlands (Champions of the 2012 Summer Olympics and the 2014 World Cup)
- Argentina (Champions of the 2014–15 World League)
- United States (Winner of 2014 Champions Challenge I)
- Australia (Invited by the FIH Executive Board)
- New Zealand (Invited by the FIH Executive Board)

== Umpires ==
Below are the umpires appointed by the International Hockey Federation:

- Claire Adenot (FRA)
- Frances Block (GBR)
- Elena Eskina (RUS)
- Kelly Hudson (NZL)
- Michelle Joubert (RSA)
- Stephanie Judefind (USA)
- Kylie Seymour (AUS)
- Emi Yamada (JPN)
- Carolina de la Fuente (ARG)
- Video Umpire: Dino Willox (AUS)

== Results ==
All times are local (UTC+1).

=== Pool ===
Pos	Team	Pld	W	D	L	GF	GA	GD	Pts	Qualification
1	Netherlands	5	5	0	0	16	4	+12	15	Final
2	Argentina	5	3	1	1	12	8	+4	10	Final
3	Australia	5	2	1	2	11	8	+3	7	Third place game
4	United States	5	1	2	2	7	11	−4	5	Third place game
5	New Zealand	5	1	1	3	7	14	−7	4	Fifth place game
6	Great Britain	5	0	1	4	3	11	−8	1	Fifth place game

Source: FIH
Rules for classification: 1) points; 2) goal difference; 3) goals scored; 4) head-to-head result.

18 June 2016
12:00

United States	2–2	Australia
Witmer 19'; Van Sickle 47'	Report	Slattery 13'; Stewart 33'

Umpires:
Claire Adenot (FRA)
Frances Block (GBR)

18 June 2016
14:00

Argentina	2–2	Great Britain
Granatto 7'; Rebecchi 47'	Report	H. Richardson-Walsh 31', 54'

Umpires:
Kelly Hudson (NZL)
Michelle Joubert (RSA)

18 June 2016
16:00

Netherlands	6–2	New Zealand
Paumen 11', 24', 49', 58'; Jonker 40', 55'	Report	Harrison 29'; Michelsen 36'

Umpires:
Elena Eskina (RUS)
Kylie Seymour (AUS)

19 June 2016
12:00

United States	1–4	Argentina
Wold 24'	Report	Rebecchi 17', 22', 57'; Granatto 25'

Umpires:
Kelly Hudson (NZL)
Emi Yamada (JPN)

19 June 2016
14:00

Netherlands	2–0	Great Britain
Welten 17'; Paumen 53'	Report

Umpires:
Carolina de la Fuente (ARG)
Claire Adenot (FRA)

19 June 2016
16:00

Australia	3–1	New Zealand
Smith 3'; Kenny 18'; Stewart 40'	Report	McLaren 3'

Umpires:
Frances Block (GBR)
Stephanie Judefind (USA)

21 June 2016
14:30

Australia	1–2	Argentina
Slattery 56'	Report	Barrionuevo 41'; Rebecchi 53'

Umpires:
Stephanie Judefind (USA)
Elena Eskina (RUS)

21 June 2016
18:00

Netherlands	4–1	United States
Van Male 4'; Dirkse van den Heuvel 10'; Welten 28', 43'	Report	Kolojejchick 24'

Umpires:
Emi Yamada (JPN)
Michelle Joubert (RSA)

21 June 2016
20:00

New Zealand	1–0	Great Britain
Michelsen 1'	Report

Umpires:
Kylie Seymour (AUS)
Carolina de la Fuente (ARG)

23 June 2016
14:30

Argentina	4–2	New Zealand
F. Habif 10'; Rebecchi 23', 33'; Granatto 47'	Report	Cocks 37'; Merry 56'

Umpires:
Elena Eskina (RUS)
Emi Yamada (JPN)

23 June 2016
18:00

Australia	1–2	Netherlands
Slattery 51'	Report	Van der Pols 6'; Paumen 31'

Umpires:
Frances Block (GBR)
Kelly Hudson (NZL)

23 June 2016
20:00

Great Britain	0–2	United States
	Report	Wold 39'; Sharkey 41'

Umpires:
Claire Adenot (FRA)
Michelle Joubert (RSA)

25 June 2016
12:00

Argentina	0–2	Netherlands
	Report	Welten 29'; Jonker 58'

Umpires:
Claire Adenot (FRA)
Emi Yamada (JPN)

25 June 2016
14:00

New Zealand	1–1	United States
Merry 36'	Report	Kolojejchick 10'

Umpires:
Carolina de la Fuente (ARG)
Kylie Seymour (AUS)

25 June 2016
16:00

Great Britain	1–4	Australia
Bray 16'	Report	Slattery 5'; Parker 6'; Smith 33'; Kenny 38'

Umpires:
Stephanie Judefind (USA)
Elena Eskina (RUS)

=== Classification ===
==== Fifth and sixth place ====
26 June 2016
14:00

New Zealand	3–4	Great Britain
McLaren 22'; Merry 39'; Smith 47'	Report	Danson 10', 33', 52'; Owsley 26'

Umpires:
Stephanie Judefind (USA)
Kylie Seymour (AUS)

==== Third and fourth place ====
26 June 2016
16:15

Australia	2–2	United States
Williams 15'; Stewart 34'	Report	Bam 42', 57'
Penalties
Nanscawen (penalty shoot-out missed); Blyth (penalty shoot-out missed); Parker (penalty shoot-out missed); Williams (penalty shoot-out missed); Sablowski (penalty shoot-out missed)	0–1	(penalty shoot-out scored) Gonzalez; (penalty shoot-out missed) Falgowski; (penalty shoot-out missed) Dawson; (penalty shoot-out missed) Kolojejchick; (penalty shoot-out missed) Dawson

Umpires:
Frances Block (GBR)
Carolina de la Fuente (ARG)

==== Final ====
26 June 2016
18:30

Netherlands	1–2	Argentina
De Goede 33'	Report	Cavallero 10'; Barrionuevo 14'

Umpires:
Kelly Hudson (NZL)
Michelle Joubert (RSA)

Team details

Netherlands
Argentina

GK	1	Joyce Sombroek
DF	7	Willemijn Bos
DF	13	Caia van Maasakker
DF	23	Margot van Geffen
MF	9	Carlien van den Heuvel
MF	18	Naomi van As (c)
MF	19	Ellen Hoog
MF	24	Eva de Goede
FW	4	Kitty van Male
FW	10	Kelly Jonker	36'
FW	12	Lidewij Welten
Substitutions:
MF	3	Xan de Waard		(substituted on) 4'
MF	8	Marloes Keetels		(substituted on) 3'
	11	Maria Verschoor		(substituted on) 4'
MF	14	Jacky Schoenaker		(substituted on) 4'
MF	16	Michelle van der Pols	18'	(substituted on) 6'
Manager:
(Australia) Alyson Annan

GK	1	Belén Succi
DF	27	Noel Barrionuevo
DF	29	Julia Gomes Fantasia	36'
MF	14	Agustina Habif
MF	16	Florencia Habif
MF	17	Rocío Sánchez Moccia
MF	20	Lucina von der Heyde
MF	25	Gabriela Aguirre
FW	15	María José Granatto
FW	11	Carla Rebecchi (c)
FW	12	Delfina Merino
Substitutions:
DF	3	Victoria Zuloaga		(substituted on) 25'
MF	6	Jimena Cedrés		(substituted on) 29'
FW	7	Martina Cavallero		(substituted on) 7'
FW	18	Pilar Romang		(substituted on) 12'
MF	23	Pilar Campoy		(substituted on) 8'
Manager:
(Argentina) Gabriel Minadeo

== Awards ==
Top Goalscorer	Player of the Tournament	Goalkeeper of the Tournament	Young Player of the Tournament
(Argentina) Carla Rebecchi	(Argentina) Carla Rebecchi	(Netherlands) Joyce Sombroek	(Argentina) María José Granatto

== Statistics ==
=== Final standings ===
1. Argentina
2. Netherlands
3. United States
4. Australia
5. Great Britain
6. New Zealand

=== Goalscorers ===
There were 70 goals scored in 18 matches, for an average of 3.89 goals per match.

7 goals

- (Argentina) Carla Rebecchi

6 goals

- (Netherlands) Maartje Paumen

4 goals

- (Australia) Kathryn Slattery
- (Netherlands) Lidewij Welten

3 goals

- (Argentina) María Granatto
- (Australia) Grace Stewart
- (United Kingdom) Alex Danson
- (Netherlands) Kelly Jonker
- (New Zealand) Olivia Merry

2 goals

- (Argentina) Noel Barrionuevo
- (Australia) Jodie Kenny
- (Australia) Emily Smith
- (United Kingdom) Helen Richardson-Walsh
- (New Zealand) Anita McLaren
- (New Zealand) Stacey Michelsen
- (United States) Katie Bam
- (United States) Kelsey Kolojejchick
- (United States) Emily Wold

1 goal

- (Argentina) Martina Cavallero
- (Argentina) Florencia Habif
- (Australia) Georgie Parker
- (Australia) Mariah Williams
- (United Kingdom) Sophie Bray
- (United Kingdom) Lily Owsley
- (Netherlands) Eva de Goede
- (Netherlands) Carlien Dirkse van den Heuvel
- (Netherlands) Michelle van der Pols
- (Netherlands) Kitty van Male
- (New Zealand) Sophie Cocks
- (New Zealand) Charlotte Harrison
- (New Zealand) Kelsey Smith
- (United States) Kathleen Sharkey
- (United States) Caitlin van Sickle
- (United States) Jill Witmer

Source: FIH
