= Emily Wold =

American field hockey player

Personal information
- Born: September 26, 1994 (age 31) Englewood, New Jersey

Sport
- Sport: Field hockey
- Position: Midfielder
- Club: Jersey Intensity
National team
Years	Team	Caps	Goals
2013–2016	United States	51	(7)
Medal record
Women's field hockey
Representing United States
Pan American Games
Gold medal – first place	2015 Toronto	Team
Champions Trophy
Bronze medal – third place	2016 London	Team
Champions Challenge I
Gold medal – first place	2014 Glasgow	Team

Emily Wold (born September 26, 1994) is a former American field hockey player, who played as a midfielder.

== Personal life ==
Wold was born in Englewood, New Jersey to Mark and Kathleen Wold. Raised in Freehold Township, New Jersey, she began playing hockey at 12 years old in 2006 and attended Freehold High School, from which she graduated in 2012.

She was a student at the University of North Carolina and majored in communication studies.

== Career ==
=== Junior National Team ===
In 2012, Wold was a member of the United States U–21 team at the Junior Pan American Cup in Guadalajara, Mexico where the team won bronze. At the tournament, Wold was captain of the team.

=== Senior National Team ===
Wold made her senior international debut in 2013, at the FIH World League Round 2 in Rio de Janeiro, Brazil.

Following her debut, Wold was a mainstay in the national team for three years until her retirement in 2016. During her career, Wold medalled with the team three times, gold at the 2014 Champions Challenge I and 2015 Pan American Games, as well as bronze at the 2016 Champions Trophy.

Wold announced her retirement from the national team in 2016, after she failed to gain selection for the 2016 Olympic Games.

==== International goals ====
Goal	Date	Location	Opponent	Score	Result	Competition	Ref.
1	6 March 2013	Deodoro Stadium, Rio de Janeiro, Brazil	Uruguay	3–0	3–0	2012–13 FIH World League Round 2	
2	9 March 2013	Deodoro Stadium, Rio de Janeiro, Brazil	Chile	1–0	2–1	2012–13 FIH World League Round 2	
3	9 February 2016	U.S. Olympic Training Center, Chula Vista, United States	Canada	3–0	5–0	Test Match	
4	14 May 2016	Spooky Nook Sports, Lancaster, United States	Chile	1–0	2–0	Test Match	
5	17 May 2016	Spooky Nook Sports, Lancaster, United States	Chile	1–0	2–0	Test Match	
6	19 June 2016	Lee Valley Hockey and Tennis Centre, London, England	Argentina	1–2	1–4	2016 Champions Trophy	
7	23 June 2016	Lee Valley Hockey and Tennis Centre, London, England	Great Britain	1–0	2–0	2016 Champions Trophy	
