= Sofía Villarroya =

Argentine field hockey player

Sofía Denise Villarroya
Personal information
- Born: 10 July 1992 (age 34) Rosario, Argentina
- Height: 160 cm (5 ft 3 in)
- Weight: 52 kg (115 lb)

Sport
- Sport: Field hockey
- Position: Midfielder
- Club: Club Atlético Provincial
National team
Years	Team	Caps	Goals
2014-2015	Argentina	10	-
Medal record
Women's field hockey
Representing Argentina
Junior World Cup
Silver medal – second place	2013 Mönchengladbach	Team

Sofía Denise Villarroya (born 10 July 1992) is an Argentine field hockey player.

== Hockey career ==
Villarroya was part of the Argentina Junior National Team at the 2013 Junior World Cup where the team won the silver medal.

In 2014, Villarroya took part of the senior national team.
