= Jordan Page =

Musician

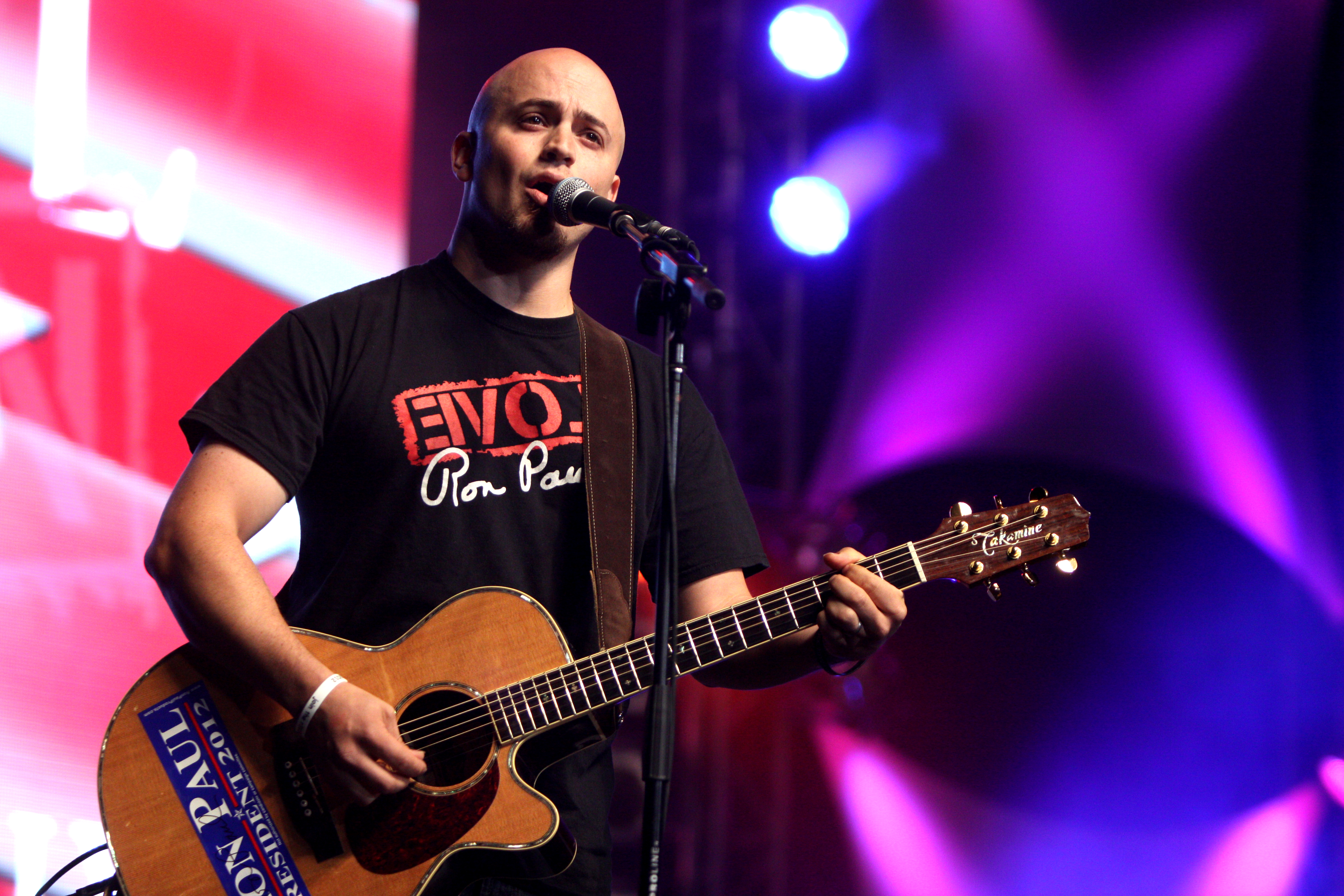
- Jordan Page performing at Ron Paul's "We Are the Future" rally.

Background information
- Born: June 13, 1979 (age 47)
- Genres: Rock, folk, country rock, soft rock
- Occupations: Singer-songwriter, musician, political activist
- Instruments: Vocals, guitar
- Years active: 2006–present
- Website: jordanpagemusic.com

Jordan Page (born June 13, 1979) is an American singer-songwriter and musician. He began writing music with a political bent during the Bush administration, in December 2006. Some of his early music is critical of United States foreign policy, especially the interventionism of the Bush administration. Page's music instead advocates a policy of peace and non-interventionism. His song "War Machine" specifically alludes to the military–industrial complex. Page's music also supports civil liberties, which are viewed in some of his songs as threatened and eroding. Page and his music have been embraced by libertarians, and Page has performed at many libertarian and liberty-oriented events, including some in support of Ron Paul's 2008 presidential campaign and 2012 presidential campaign.

== Career ==
Page has centered his career on creating music similar in style and purpose to late-20th century folk musicians before him. Page's song "Song for Bob Dylan" identifies some of the similarities between himself and other musicians who have sought political change through music. The song specifically mentions his and Bob Dylan's shared view that war is evil. Page has followed Congressman Ron Paul since late 2007 and started writing songs about the views of the congressman shortly afterwards. He also performed in support of Pat McGeehan's campaign for a seat in the West Virginia Senate and at events associated with the Free State Project, such as the Porcupine Freedom Festival.
