= Agustina Taborda =

Uruguayan field hockey player

Personal information
- Full name: María Agustina Taborda Pérez
- Born: 27 December 1994 (age 31) Uruguay
- Height: 158 cm (5 ft 2 in)

Sport
- Sport: Field hockey
- Position: Forward
National team
Years	Team	Caps	Goals
2012	Uruguay U–21	6	(6)
2013–	Uruguay	40	(18)
Medal record
Representing Uruguay
Women's field hockey
South American Games
Silver medal – second place	2018 Cochabamba	Team

María Agustina Taborda Pérez (born 27 December 1994) is a Uruguayan field hockey player, who plays as a forward.

== Career ==
=== Under–21 ===
Agustina Taborda made her debut for the Uruguay U–21 at the 2012 Pan American Junior Championship in Guadalajara.

=== Las Cimarronas ===
Taborda made her senior international debut for Las Cimarronas in 2013 at the Pan American Cup in Mendoza.

In 2018, she won her first medal with the team, taking home silver at the South American Games in Cochabamba.

Following a five-year hiatus from the national team, she was renamed in the squad in 2023. She will appear at her second Pan American Games in Santiago.
