= Ignacio Bergner =

Argentine field hockey player

Personal information
- Full name: Ignacio Ricardo Bergner
- Born: 26 August 1984 (age 41) Vicente López, Buenos Aires
- Height: 191 cm (6 ft 3 in)
- Weight: 86 kg (190 lb)

Sport
- Sport: Field hockey
Medal record
Men's field hockey
Representing Argentina
Pan American Games
Gold medal – first place	2011 Guadalajara	Team
- Updated on 26 June 2015

Ignacio Bergner (born 26 August 1984) is an Argentine field hockey player. Has a sister in Mendoza Ingrid Bergner. Cuñado del kayakista Sebastián Lujan. At the 2012 Summer Olympics, he competed for the national team in the men's tournament. Bergner plays in Royal Orée Hockey Club in Brussels.

Bergner played for the Argentina national team in the 2007 Men's Hockey Champions Challenge. He then represented Argentina in the 2007 Pan American Games, winning the silver medal. Ignacio has also won the gold medal at the 2011 Pan American Games.
