= Antoni Kindler =

Canadian field hockey player

Personal information
- Full name: Antoni Pawel Kindler
- Born: May 16, 1988 (age 38) Urbana, Illinois, U.S.
- Height: 1.88 m (6 ft 2 in)
- Weight: 85 kg (187 lb)

Sport
- Sport: Field hockey
- Position: Goalkeeper
- Club: West Vancouver
National team
Years	Team	Caps	Goals
–	Canada	112	(0)
Medal record
Representing Canada
Pan American Games
Silver medal – second place	2011 Guadalajara
Pan American Cup
Gold medal – first place	2009 Santiago
Silver medal – second place	2013 Brampton
Bronze medal – third place	2022 Santiago

Antoni Kindler (born May 16, 1988) is a Canadian field hockey player, in the goalkeeper position. Kindler has competed internationally for Canada since 2011. Kindler resides in Vancouver, British Columbia.

== Career ==
Kindler competed for Canada at the 2011 Pan American Games in Guadalajara. The team finished with the silver medal. In 2018, Kindler competed for Canada at the 2018 Commonwealth Games in the Gold Coast, Australia. The team finished in 8th.

=== Olympics ===
Kindler represented Canada at the Tokyo 2020 Summer Olympics.
