= Matthew Guest =

Australian field hockey player

Personal information
- Born: April 26, 1985 (age 41) Shepparton, Australia
- Height: 190 cm (6 ft 3 in)
- Weight: 90 kg (198 lb)

Sport
- Country: Canada
- Sport: Field hockey
Medal record
Men's field hockey
Representing Canada
Pan American Games
Silver medal – second place	2015 Toronto	Team
Silver medal – second place	2011 Guadalajara	Team

Matthew Guest (born April 26, 1985, in Shepparton, Australia) is a male field hockey player, who played for the Canada national field hockey team at the 2015 Pan American Games and won a silver medal.

In 2016, he was named to Canada's Olympic team.
