= Michelle Cesan =

American field hockey player

Personal information
- Born: March 18, 1991 (age 35) Harding Township, New Jersey, U.S.
- Height: 5 ft 8 in (173 cm)
- Weight: 146 lb (66 kg)

Sport
- Sport: Field hockey
Medal record
Women's field hockey
Representing United States
Pan American Games
Gold medal – first place	2011 Guadalajara	Team

Michelle Cesan (born March 18, 1991, in Harding Township, New Jersey) is an American field hockey player. At the 2012 Summer Olympics, she competed for the United States women's national field hockey team in the women's event. She attended Princeton University and was named an NFHCA All-American for two seasons.
