= Kaisuami Dall'Orso =

Uruguayan field hockey player

Personal information
- Full name: Kaisuami Dall'Orso Ramírez
- Born: 1 June 1993 (age 33) Montevideo, Uruguay
- Height: 165 cm (5 ft 5 in)
- Weight: 60 kg (132 lb)

Sport
- Sport: Field hockey
- Position: Midfield
National team
Years	Team	Caps	Goals
2012	Uruguay U–21	6	(2)
2013–	Uruguay	71	(18)
Medal record
Representing Uruguay
Women's field hockey
Pan American Cup
Bronze medal – third place	2025 Montevideo
South American Games
Silver medal – second place	2018 Cochabamba	Team
Bronze medal – third place	2022 Asunción	Team

Kaisuami Dall'Orso Ramírez (born 1 June 1993) is a Uruguayan field hockey player, who plays as a midfielder.

== Career ==
=== Under–21 ===
In 2012, Dall'Orso was a member of the Uruguay U–21 team at the Pan American Junior Championships in Guadalajara.

=== Las Cimarronas ===
Dall'Orso made her senior international debut for Las Cimarronas in 2013, at the Pan American Cup in Mendoza.

Since her debut, Dall'Orso has been a constant member in the national team. She won silver and bronze at the 2018 and 2022 editions of the South American Games, respectively.

In 2023, she was named in the squad for the Pan American Games in Santiago.

In 2025, after competing at the Pan American Cup she retired from the national squad in front of a homecrowd.
