= Field hockey at the 2011 Pan American Games – Women's Qualifier =

2011 Pan American Games Women's Field Hockey Qualifier
Tournament details
- Host country: Jamaica
- City: Kingston
- Teams: 2
- Venue(s): Mona Hockey Field

Final positions
- Champions: Cuba
- Runner-up: Jamaica

Tournament statistics
- Matches played: 3
- Goals scored: 11 (3.67 per match)
- Top scorer(s): (Cuba) Marisbel Sierra Rosello (3 goals)

The Women's Field Hockey Qualifier for the 2011 Pan American Games was a field hockey series between Cuba and Jamaica to determine the last entry into the field hockey competition at the 2011 Pan American Games for women. All games were played in Mona Hockey Field, Kingston, Jamaica from October 28–31, 2010.

Cuba won the series 3–0 and as a result advanced to the 2011 Pan American Games.

This series became necessary, because Cuba decided to skip the 2010 Central American and Caribbean Games. Jamaica would have qualified under the old qualifying system (third qualifying position from the 2009 Pan American Cup).

== Results ==
=== Pool A ===
Team	Pts	Pld	W	D	L	GF	GA	GD
Cuba	9	3	3	0	0	10	1	+9
Jamaica	0	3	0	0	3	1	10	–9

28 October 2010
16:00

Jamaica	0 – 3	Cuba
	Report	Vera Rojas 36'; Sierra Rosello 36' 36'

Umpires:
Emma Simmons (BER)
Stephanie Judefind (USA)

30 October 2010
16:00

Jamaica	1 – 2	Cuba
Elliott 60'	Report	Alvarez Guerra 21' 53'

Umpires:
Stephanie Judefind (USA)
Suzanne Sutton (USA)

31 October 2010
16:00

Jamaica	0 – 5	Cuba
	Report	Sierra Rosello 3' 29'; Paso Flor 61'; Alvarez Guerra 62'; Vera Rojas 65'

Umpires:
Suzanne Sutton (USA)
Emma Simmons (BER)
