= Mariela Scarone =

Argentine field hockey player (born 1986)

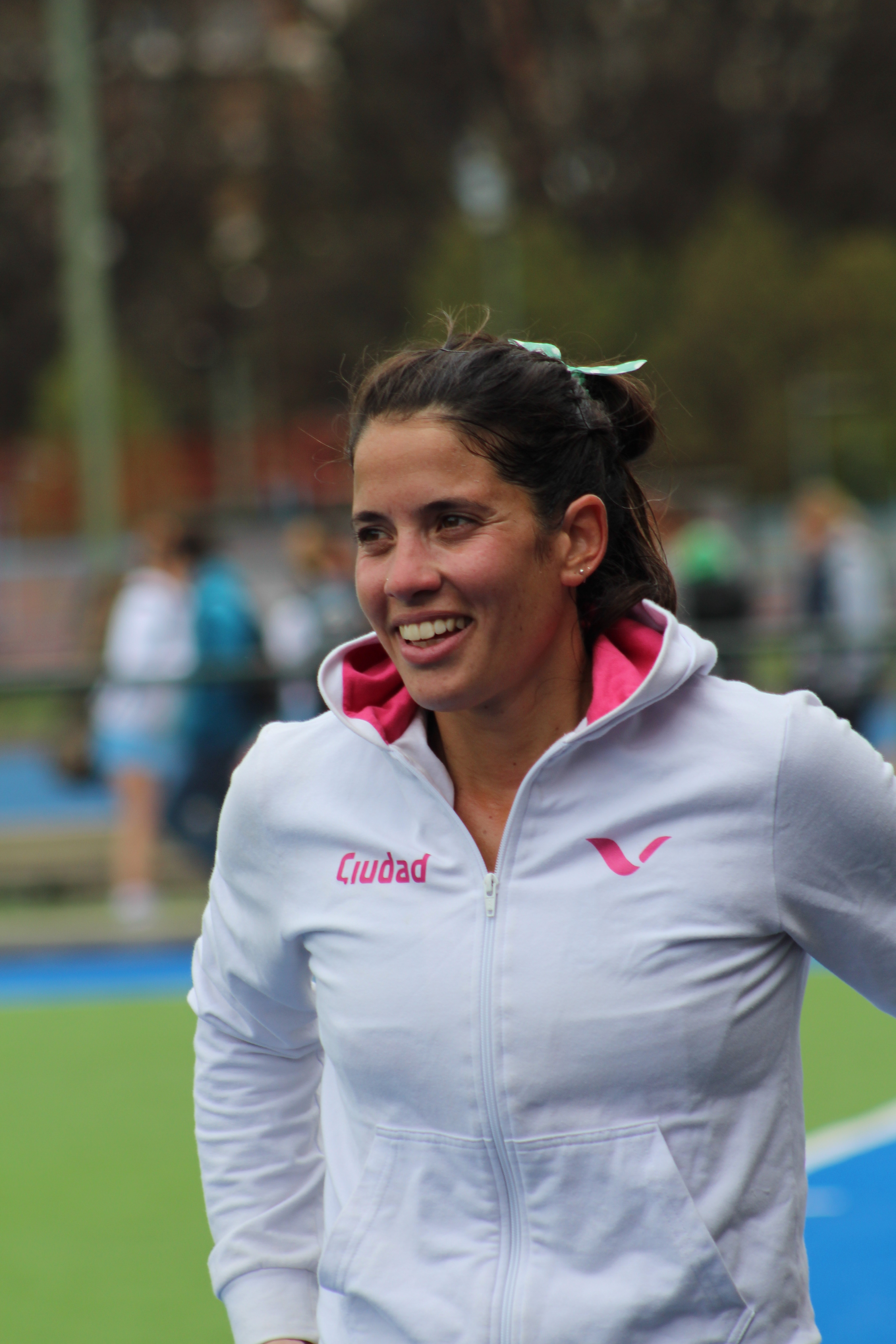

Personal information
- Full name: Mariela Carla Scarone
- Born: 4 October 1986 (age 39) Buenos Aires, Argentina
- Height: 1.63 m (5 ft 4 in)

Sport
- Sport: Field hockey
- Position: Defender
- Club: Ciudad de Buenos Aires
Senior career
Years	Team	Caps	Goals
2003–Present	Ciudad de Buenos Aires	-	-
National team
Years	Team	Caps	Goals
2009–2015	Argentina	182	-
Medal record
Women's Field hockey
Representing Argentina
Summer Olympics
Silver medal – second place	2012 London	Team
World Cup
Gold medal – first place	2010 Rosario	Team
Bronze medal – third place	2014 The Hague	Team
Champions Trophy
Gold medal – first place	2009 Sydney	Team
Gold medal – first place	2010 Nottingham	Team
Gold medal – first place	2012 Rosario	Team
Gold medal – first place	2014 Mendoza	Team
Silver medal – second place	2011 Amstelveen	Team
Pan American Games
Silver medal – second place	2011 Guadalajara	Team
Pan American Cup
Gold medal – first place	2013 Mendoza	Team

Mariela Carla Scarone (born 4 October 1986) is an Argentine field hockey player. At the 2012 Summer Olympics, she competed for the Argentina women's national field hockey team in the women's event and won the silver medal. Mariela has also won the World Cup in 2010, the bronze medal in the World Cup 2014, four Champions Trophy (2009, 2010, 2012, 2014), silver medal in 2011, the silver medal at the 2011 Pan American Games and the gold medal at the Pan American Cup in 2013.
