= Caroline Nichols =

American field hockey player

Personal information
- Born: December 15, 1984 (age 41) Hamilton, Bermuda
- Education: Old Dominion University
- Height: 5 ft 4 in (1.63 m)

Sport
- Position: right midfielder
- Team: USA National Squad
Medal record
Women's field hockey
Representing United States
Pan American Games
Gold medal – first place	2011 Guadalajara	Team

Caroline Nelson-Nichols (born December 15, 1984) is an American field hockey player. She is a member of the 2008 U.S. Olympic Team for Women’s Field Hockey and the 2012 US Olympic team. Before serving as the interim head coach of the US Women's National Team from January 2020 to June 2020, Nichols was the head coach of Columbia Field Hockey between 2015 and 2019. Nichols now is a performance coach on the staff of Saint Joseph's University's field hockey team.

== Early life and education ==
Nichols was born in Hamilton, Bermuda. She grew up in Virginia Beach, Virginia, playing both soccer and field hockey in school. She dropped soccer to concentrate on hockey before graduating from Salem High School in 2003. She graduated from Old Dominion University in 2007, with a major in biology.

== Amateur athletic career ==
Nichols played varsity field hockey on the Lady Monarchs for four years at Old Dominion University. She was an Academic All-Americann and First String All-American and a member of the Colonial Athletic Association championship team in 2005.

On June 23, 2008, USA Field Hockey nominated Nichols to the 2008 U.S. Olympic Team for Women’s Field Hockey.

== Coaching ==
Nichols was the head coach of the Columbia Field Hockey Team from 2015 to 2019 where she amassed a win percentage of 0.4875. From January to June 2020, Nichols was the interim head coach of the United States women's national field hockey team.
