= Laura Aladro =

Argentine field hockey player

Personal information
- Full name: María Laura Aladro
- Born: January 17, 1983 (age 43) Tandil, Argentina

Sport
- Sport: Field hockey
- Position: Goalkeeper
- Club: River Plate
Senior career
Years	Team	Caps	Goals
–	Independiente de Tandil	-	-
2006–present	River Plate	-	-
National team
Years	Team	Caps	Goals
2001–2003	Argentina U21		-
2005–2016	Argentina	74	-
Medal record
Women's field hockey
Representing Argentina
World Cup
Gold medal – first place	2010 Rosario
World League
Gold medal – first place	2014–15 Rosario
Champions Trophy
Gold medal – first place	2009 Sydney
Gold medal – first place	2010 Nottingham
Gold medal – first place	2014 Mendoza
Silver medal – second place	2011 Amstelveen
Pan American Games
Silver medal – second place	2011 Guadalajara	Team
Pan American Cup
Gold medal – first place	2009 Hamilton
Junior World Cup
Silver medal – second place	2001 Buenos Aires
- Updated on January 26, 2016

María Laura Aladro (born 17 January 1983) is an Argentine field hockey player who plays as a goalkeeper.

She won the 2010 World Cup with the Argentina national team. Laura also won three Champions Trophy (2009, 2010, 2014), the World League 2014–15 and the Pan American Cup in 2009.
