= Josefina Khamis =

Chilean field hockey player

Personal information
- Full name: Josefina Khamis Jadue
- Born: 26 September 1993 (age 32) Chile

Sport
- Sport: Field hockey
- Position: Forward
National team
| Years | Team | Caps | Goals |
| 2010– | Chile | 50 | (2) |
| 2012 | Chile U21 | 7 | (7) |
Medal record
Women's field hockey
Representing Chile
Pan American Games
| Bronze medal – third place | 2011 Guadalajara | Team |
South American Games
| Gold medal – first place | 2022 Asunción | Team |

Josefina Khamis Jadue (born 26 September 1993) is a field hockey player from Chile.

== Personal life ==
Josefina Khamis is of Palestinian descent, and works as a commercial engineer.

== Career ==
=== Junior national team ===
In 2012, Khamis was a member of the Chile U21 team at the Pan American Junior Championship in Guadalajara. Chile finished fourth at the tournament, with Khamis scoring seven goals.

=== Las Diablas ===
Josefina Khamis made her debut for Las Diablas in 2010. The following year she won a bronze medal with the team at the 2011 Pan American Games in Guadalajara.

In 2012, she appeared at the qualifying tournament for the 2012 Summer Olympics held in Kakamigahara.

Following a ten-year hiatus from the national team, Khamis made her return in 2022 when she was named in the squad for the FIH World Cup in Terrassa and Amsterdam.
