= Eugenia Garraffo =

Italian-Argentine field hockey player (born 1993)

Personal information
- Born: Eugenia Maria Garraffo; 29 July 1993 (age 33) Buenos Aires, Argentina

Sport
- Sport: Field hockey
- Position: Forward
- Club: Ciudad
National team
Years	Team	Caps	Goals
–	Italy	49	-

Eugenia Maria Garraffo (born 29 July 1993) is an Italian-Argentine field hockey player for the Italian national team. She is the daughter of former Argentinian hockey player Marcelo Garraffo.

== Career ==
Garraffo represented Argentina at the 2010 Summer Youth Olympics. She received her first national team callup for Argentina in 2011.

She represented Italy in the 2018 Women's Hockey World Cup.
