= Rachel Dawson =

American field hockey player

Medal record

Women's field hockey

Representing United States

Pan American Games
Gold medal – first place	2011 Guadalajara	Team

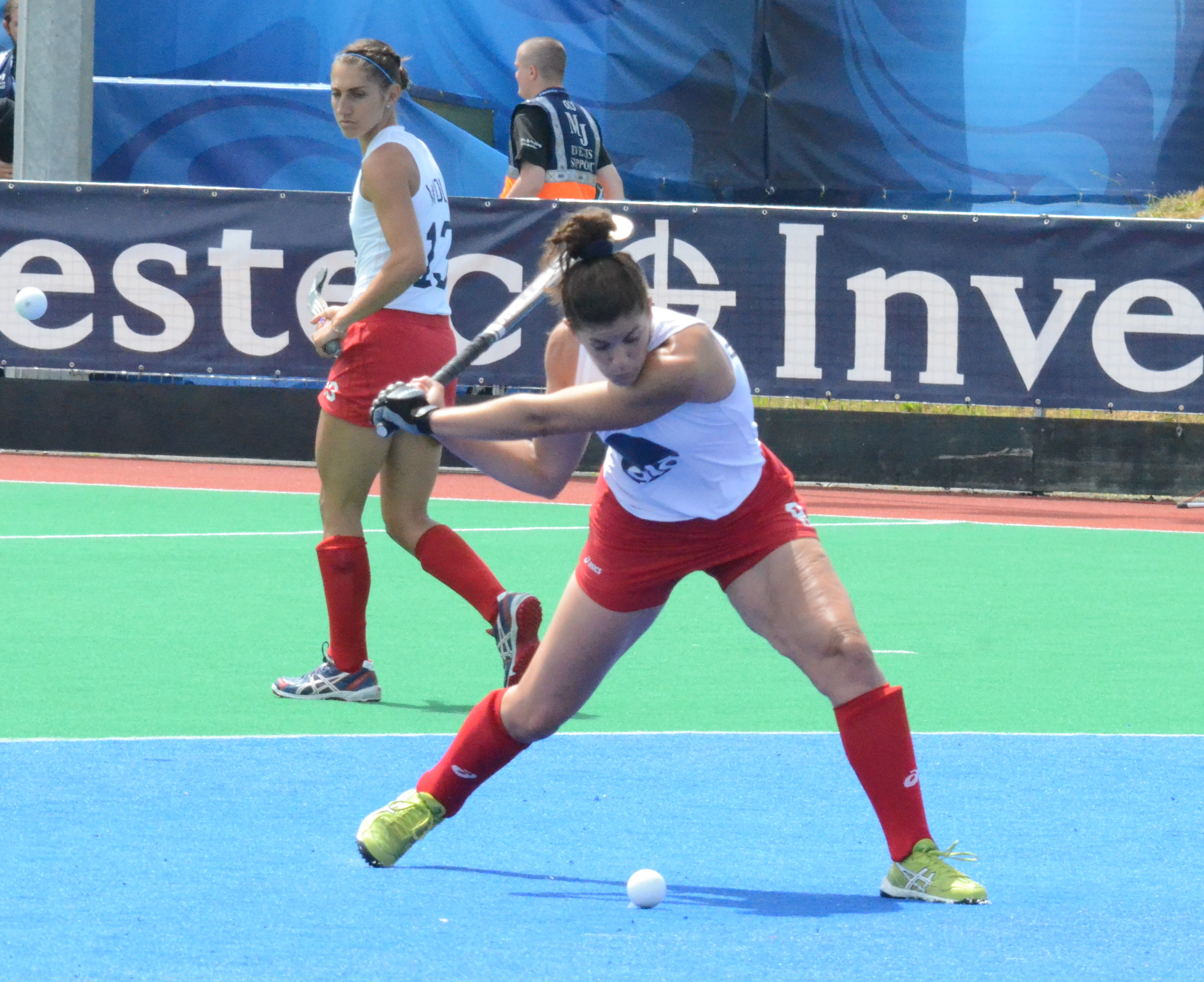

Rachel Dawson (born August 2, 1985) is an American field hockey player. A midfielder / back, she earned her first senior career cap vs Australia on June 5, 2005. Dawson was named to the U.S. field hockey team for the 2008 Summer Olympics and 2012 Summer Olympics, with the team finishing in 8th and 12th respectively.

Dawson was born in Camden, New Jersey, one of eight children and grew up in Berlin, New Jersey, and attended Eastern Regional High School, where she graduated in 2003. She graduated from the University of North Carolina at Chapel Hill in 2007 and resides in North Carolina.

== College ==
In 2008, while at North Carolina, Dawson won the Honda Sports Award as the nation's best female field hockey player.

== International senior competitions ==
- 2006 – World Cup Qualifier, Rome (4th)
