= Copa Centenario Revolución de Mayo squads =

The following are the squads of the national teams that played in the Copa Centenario Revolución de Mayo, held in 1910 in Argentina. The participating countries were Argentina, Chile and Uruguay. The teams plays in a single round-robin tournament, earning two points for a win, one point for a draw, and zero points for a loss.

== Argentina ==
Head Coach: n/i (Note: The first appointed coach of an Argentina national team was Ángel Vásquez in 1924.)

No.	Pos.	Player	Date of birth (age)	Caps	Goals	Club
—	DF	Ernesto Brown	7 January 1885 (aged 25)	5	1	(Argentine Football Association) Alumni
—	DF	Jorge Brown (c)	3 April 1880 (aged 30)	11	4	(Argentine Football Association) Alumni
—	DF	Juan Domingo Brown	20 June 1888 (aged 21)	9	0	(Argentine Football Association) Alumni
—	DF	Arturo Chiappe		13	0	(Argentine Football Association) River Plate
—	FW	Elías Fernández	1 January 1891 (aged 19)	16	1	(Argentine Football Association) River Plate
—	MF	Armando Ginocchio		2	0	(Argentine Football Association) Newell's Old Boys
—	FW	Manuel Paulino González	22 June 1889 (aged 20)	1	0	(Argentine Football Association) Newell's Old Boys
—	MF	Haroldo Grant		2	0	(Argentine Football Association) Belgrano A.C.
—	DF	Santiago Pío Gallino		0	0	(Argentine Football Association) Gimnasia y Esgrima (BA)
—	FW	Juan Enrique Hayes	20 January 1891 (aged 19)	1	1	(Argentine Football Association) Rosario Central
—	MF	Arturo Jacobs	9 December 1884 (aged 25)	5	0	(Argentine Football Association) Alumni
—	FW	Ricardo Malbrán	20 July 1889 (aged 20)	1	2	(Argentine Football Association) San Isidro
—	GK	Enrique Rojo		1	0	(Argentine Football Association) Estudiantes (BA)
—	FW	Maximiliano Susán	19 June 1888 (aged 21)	7	2	(Argentine Football Association) Estudiantes (BA)
—	DF	Luis Amadeo Vernet		2	0	(Argentine Football Association) Gimnasia y Esgrima (BA)
—	FW	José Viale	1 February 1890 (aged 20)	5	2	(Argentine Football Association) Newell's Old Boys
—	FW	Arnold Watson Hutton	20 August 1886 (aged 23)	6	3	(Argentine Football Association) Alumni
—	MF	Gottlob Weiss	11 January 1886 (aged 24)	6	0	(Argentine Football Association) Alumni
—	GK	Carlos Tomás Wilson	1 January 1889 (aged 21)	7	0	(Argentine Football Association) San Isidro

  - They did not play in said tournament although they were called:**Abelardo Vazquez GK / /18 San Lorenzo de Almagro (Argentina), ** Jose Gorena DF / /18 San Lorenzo de Almagro, **Atilio Badaracco DF 19/06/1887 River Plate (Argentina),** Francisco Carlos Olazar DF/ MF 10/07/1885 Racing Club (Argentina) ** Emilio Bonatti MF 16/08/1889 Rosario Central (Argentina).

== Chile ==
Head Coach:

No.	Pos.	Player	Date of birth (age)	Caps	Goals	Club
—	MF	Arturo Acuña	26 February 1881 (aged 29)	1	0	(Football Federation of Chile) Santiago Wanderers
—	DF	Henry Allen (c)		1	0	(Football Federation of Chile) Unión Santiago
—	DF	E.F. Ashe		0	0	(Football Federation of Chile) Bádminton
—	DF	Luis Barriga		1	0	(Football Federation of Chile) Santiago National
—	MF	Colin Campbell	10 February 1883 (aged 27)	1	0	(Football Federation of Chile) Santiago National
—	FW	J. P. Davidson		1	0	(Football Federation of Chile) Bádminton
—	GK	Leonard Gibson	31 July 1881 (aged 28)	1	0	(Football Federation of Chile) Old Valparaíso
—	MF	Próspero González	30 September 1886 (aged 23)	1	0	(Football Federation of Chile) Arco Iris
—	FW	Juan Hamilton		1	0	(Football Federation of Chile) Old Valparaíso
—	DF	Carlos Hormazábal	4 August 1884 (aged 25)	1	0	(Football Federation of Chile) Magallanes
—	DF	Andrés Hoyl		1	0	(Football Federation of Chile) Bádminton
—	DF	J. MacWilliams		0	0	(Football Federation of Chile) Bádminton
—	MF	Joseph "Joe" Robson		0	0	(Football Federation of Chile) English FC
—	MF	Frank Simmons	12 November 1884 (aged 25)	1	1	(Football Federation of Chile) Bádminton
—	FW	Heriberto Sturgess		0	0	(Football Federation of Chile) Rangers de Talca

They did not play in said tournament although they were called: **Luis Carlos Fanta GK 21/08/1890 Santiago National (Chile), **Juan Henry Livigstone FW 07/04/1889 Santiago National (Chile), **Enrique Abraham Teuche MF 16/03/1894 Cinco de Abril F.C. (Chile), **Pablo Woitas Salgado GK 21/08/1887 Santiago Wanderers (Chile) **Primedio Brito MF/ FW / /18 La Cruz Valparaiso (Chile), ** Harold Dean MF / /18 Old Valparaiso (Chile) **Agustin Elgueta MF / /18 Eleuterio Ramirez F.C. (Chile) ** Carlos Gonzalez DF / /18 Santiago Wanderers (Chile).

== Uruguay ==
Head Coach:

No.	Pos.	Player	Date of birth (age)	Caps	Goals	Club
—	DF	Martín Aphesteguy	22 September 1888 (aged 21)	1	0	(Uruguayan Football Association) Montevideo Wanderers
—	MF	José Benincasa	16 June 1891 (aged 18)	0	0	(Uruguayan Football Association) River Plate
—	DF	Juan Carlos Bertone (c)		8	1	(Uruguayan Football Association) Montevideo Wanderers
—	FW	José Brachi	26 December 1892 (aged 17)	5	2	(Uruguayan Football Association) Dublin
—	FW	Robert Sidney Buck	c. 1885	1	1	(Uruguayan Football Association) Montevideo Wanderers
—	DF	Federico Crocker		1	0	(Uruguayan Football Association) Dublin
—	FW	Pablo Dacal	30 June 1886 (aged 23)	4	0	(Uruguayan Football Association) River Plate
—	MF	Juan Harley	5 March 1886 (aged 24)	1	0	(Uruguayan Football Association) CURCC
—	DF	Vicente Módena		4	0	(Uruguayan Football Association) River Plate
—	FW	Juan Pena	13 August 1882 (aged 27)	7	0	(Uruguayan Football Association) Nacional
—	FW	José Piendibene	5 June 1890 (aged 19)	1	0	(Uruguayan Football Association) CURCC
—	FW	Santiago Raymonda		2	2	(Uruguayan Football Association) River Plate
—	GK	Cayetano Saporiti	14 January 1887 (aged 23)	8	0	(Uruguayan Football Association) Montevideo Wanderers
—	FW	Carlos Scarone	11 November 1888 (aged 21)	1	0	(Uruguayan Football Association) CURCC
—	DF	Pedro Zuazú		6	0	(Uruguayan Football Association) Nacional

They did not play in said tournament although they were called:** Leonard Crossley GK / /1883 CURCC Peñarol (Uruguay), **Felipe Canavessi FW / /18 CURCC Peñarol (Uruguay) **Santiago Demarchi GK / /18 Club Nacional de Football (Uruguay) ** Juan Manuel Fernandez de la Sierra DF / /18 Montevideo Wanderers (Uruguay) **Florencio Ygartua Fliho DF 11/09/1892 Internacional Porto Alegre (Brazil) **Luis Piñeyro Carve MF / /18 Montevideo Wanderers (Uruguay) **Felix Lourtet MF / /18 (Uruguay) **Abdon Porta MF / /18 Colon F.C. (Uruguay.
