= List of Argentina national rugby union team test match results =

A list of all international Test matches played by Los Pumas.

== Legend ==
| Win | Loss | Draw |

== 1910s ==
| Date | Opponent | F | A | Venue | City | Winner |
|---|---|---|---|---|---|---|
| 1910-06-12 | British Lions | 3 | 28 | Sociedad Sportiva Argentina | Buenos Aires | British Lions |

== 1920s ==
| Date | Opponent | F | A | Venue | City | Winner |
|---|---|---|---|---|---|---|
| 1927-07-31 | British Lions | 0 | 37 | Gimnasia y Esgrima | Buenos Aires | British Lions |
| 1927-08-07 | British Lions | 0 | 46 | Gimnasia y Esgrima | Buenos Aires | British Lions |
| 1927-08-14 | British Lions | 3 | 34 | Gimnasia y Esgrima | Buenos Aires | British Lions |
| 1927-08-21 | British Lions | 0 | 43 | Gimnasia y Esgrima | Buenos Aires | British Lions |

== 1930s ==
| Date | Opponent | F | A | Venue | City | Winner |
|---|---|---|---|---|---|---|
| 1932-07-16 | Junior Springboks | 0 | 42 | Ferrocarrill Oeste | Buenos Aires | (South Africa) Junior Springboks |
| 1932-07-23 | Junior Springboks | 3 | 34 | Ferrocarrill Oeste | Buenos Aires | (South Africa) Junior Springboks |
| 1936-08-16 | British Lions | 0 | 23 | Gimnasia y Esgrima | Buenos Aires | British Lions |
| 1936-09-20 | Chile | 29 | 0 | Playa Ancha | Valparaíso | Argentina |
| 1936-09-27 | Chile | 31 | 3 | Playa Ancha | Valparaíso | Argentina |
| 1938-08-21 | Chile | 33 | 3 | Gimnasia y Esgrima | Buenos Aires | Argentina |

== 1940s ==
| Date | Opponent | F | A | Venue | City | Winner |
|---|---|---|---|---|---|---|
| 1948-08-29 | Oxford and Cambridge | 0 | 17 | Gimnasia y Esgrima | Buenos Aires | Oxford and Cambridge |
| 1948-09-05 | Oxford and Cambridge | 0 | 39 | Gimnasia y Esgrima | Buenos Aires | Oxford and Cambridge |
| 1949-08-28 | France | 0 | 5 | Gimnasia y Esgrima | Buenos Aires | France |
| 1949-09-04 | France | 3 | 12 | Gimnasia y Esgrima | Buenos Aires | France |

== 1950s ==
| Date | Opponent | F | A | Venue | City | Winner |
|---|---|---|---|---|---|---|
| 1951-09-09 | Uruguay | 62 | 0 | Gimnasia y Esgrima | Buenos Aires | Argentina |
| 1951-09-13 | Brazil | 72 | 0 | Gimnasia y Esgrima | Buenos Aires | Argentina |
| 1951-09-16 | Chile | 13 | 3 | Gimnasia y Esgrima | Buenos Aires | Argentina |
| 1952-08-24 | Ireland | 3 | 3 | Gimnasia y Esgrima | Buenos Aires | Draw |
| 1952-08-31 | Ireland | 0 | 6 | Gimnasia y Esgrima | Buenos Aires | Ireland |
| 1954-08-29 | France | 8 | 22 | Gimnasia y Esgrima | Buenos Aires | France |
| 1954-09-12 | France | 3 | 30 | Gimnasia y Esgrima | Buenos Aires | France |
| 1956-08-26 | Oxford and Cambridge | 6 | 25 | Gimnasia y Esgrima | Buenos Aires | Oxford and Cambridge |
| 1956-09-16 | Oxford and Cambridge | 3 | 11 | Gimnasia y Esgrima | Buenos Aires | Oxford and Cambridge |
| 1958-10-11 | Peru | 44 | 0 | Prince of Wales Country Club | Santiago | Argentina |
| 1958-10-15 | Uruguay | 50 | 3 | Estadio Sausalito | Viña del Mar | Argentina |
| 1958-10-18 | Chile | 14 | 0 | Prince of Wales Country Club | Santiago | Argentina |
| 1959-09-12 | Junior Springboks | 6 | 14 | Gimnasia y Esgrima | Buenos Aires | (South Africa) Junior Springboks |
| 1959-10-03 | Junior Springboks | 6 | 20 | Gimnasia y Esgrima | Buenos Aires | (South Africa) Junior Springboks |

== 1960s ==
| Date | Opponent | F | A | Venue | City | Winner |
|---|---|---|---|---|---|---|
| 1960-07-23 | France | 3 | 37 | Gimnasia y Esgrima | Buenos Aires | France |
| 1960-08-06 | France | 3 | 12 | Gimnasia y Esgrima | Buenos Aires | France |
| 1960-08-12 | France | 6 | 29 | Gimnasia y Esgrima | Buenos Aires | France |
| 1961-10-07 | Chile | 11 | 3 | Carrasco Polo Club | Montevideo | Argentina |
| 1961-10-12 | Brazil | 60 | 0 | Carrasco Polo Club | Montevideo | Argentina |
| 1961-10-14 | Uruguay | 36 | 3 | Carrasco Polo Club | Montevideo | Argentina |
| 1964-08-15 | Uruguay | 25 | 6 | São Paulo Athletic Club | São Paulo | Argentina |
| 1964-08-19 | Brazil | 30 | 8 | São Paulo Athletic Club | São Paulo | Argentina |
| 1964-08-22 | Chile | 30 | 8 | São Paulo Athletic Club | São Paulo | Argentina |
| 1965-06-19 | Junior Springboks | 11 | 6 | Ellis Park | Johannesburg | Argentina |
| 1965-09-11 | Oxford and Cambridge | 19 | 19 | Gimnasia y Esgrima | Buenos Aires | Draw |
| 1965-09-18 | Oxford and Cambridge | 3 | 9 | Gimnasia y Esgrima | Buenos Aires | Oxford and Cambridge |
| 1965-09-26 | Chile | 23 | 11 | Stade Francais | Santiago | Argentina |
| 1966-09-24 | SA Gazelles | 3 | 9 | Gimnasia y Esgrima | Buenos Aires | (South Africa) SA Gazelles |
| 1966-10-01 | SA Gazelles | 15 | 20 | Gimnasia y Esgrima | Buenos Aires | (South Africa) SA Gazelles |
| 1967-09-27 | Uruguay | 38 | 6 | CA San Isidro | San Isidro | Argentina |
| 1967-10-30 | Chile | 18 | 0 | CA San Isidro | San Isidro | Argentina |
| 1968-09-14 | Wales | 9 | 5 | Gimnasia y Esgrima | Buenos Aires | Argentina |
| 1968-09-28 | Wales | 9 | 9 | Gimnasia y Esgrima | Buenos Aires | Draw |
| 1969-09-13 | Scotland | 20 | 3 | Gimnasia y Esgrima | Buenos Aires | Argentina |
| 1969-09-27 | Scotland | 3 | 6 | Gimnasia y Esgrima | Buenos Aires | Scotland |
| 1969-10-04 | Uruguay | 41 | 6 | Prince of Wales Country Club | Santiago | Argentina |
| 1969-10-11 | Chile | 54 | 0 | Prince of Wales Country Club | Santiago | Argentina |

== 1970s ==
| Date | Opponent | F | A | Venue | City | Winner |
|---|---|---|---|---|---|---|
| 1970-09-13 | Ireland | 8 | 3 | Ferrocarrill Oeste | Buenos Aires | Argentina |
| 1970-09-20 | Ireland | 6 | 3 | Ferrocarrill Oeste | Buenos Aires | Argentina |
| 1971-07-17 | SA Gazelles | 12 | 6 | | Port Elizabeth | Argentina |
| 1971-08-07 | SA Gazelles | 0 | 12 | | Pretoria | (South Africa) SA Gazelles |
| 1971-08-28 | Oxford and Cambridge | 11 | 3 | Gimnasia y Esgrima | Buenos Aires | Argentina |
| 1971-09-04 | Oxford and Cambridge | 6 | 3 | Gimnasia y Esgrima | Buenos Aires | Argentina |
| 1971-10-10 | Chile | 20 | 3 | Carrasco Polo Club | Montevideo | Argentina |
| 1971-10-12 | Brazil | 50 | 3 | Carrasco Polo Club | Montevideo | Argentina |
| 1971-10-16 | Paraguay | 61 | 0 | Carrasco Polo Club | Montevideo | Argentina |
| 1971-10-17 | Uruguay | 55 | 6 | Carrasco Polo Club | Montevideo | Argentina |
| 1972-10-21 | SA Gazelles | 6 | 14 | Ferrocarrill Oeste | Buenos Aires | (South Africa) SA Gazelles |
| 1972-11-04 | SA Gazelles | 18 | 16 | Ferrocarrill Oeste | Buenos Aires | Argentina |
| 1973-09-08 | Romania | 15 | 9 | Ferrocarrill Oeste | Buenos Aires | Argentina |
| 1973-09-15 | Romania | 24 | 3 | Ferrocarrill Oeste | Buenos Aires | Argentina |
| 1973-10-14 | Paraguay | 98 | 3 | São Paulo Athletic Club | São Paulo | Argentina |
| 1973-10-16 | Uruguay | 55 | 0 | São Paulo Athletic Club | São Paulo | Argentina |
| 1973-10-20 | Brazil | 96 | 0 | São Paulo Athletic Club | São Paulo | Argentina |
| 1973-10-21 | Chile | 60 | 3 | São Paulo Athletic Club | São Paulo | Argentina |
| 1973-11-10 | Ireland | 8 | 21 | Lansdowne Road | Dublin | Ireland |
| 1973-11-24 | Scotland | 11 | 12 | Murrayfield | Edinburgh | Scotland |
| 1974-06-20 | France | 15 | 20 | Ferrocarrill Oeste | Buenos Aires | France |
| 1974-06-29 | France | 27 | 31 | Ferrocarrill Oeste | Buenos Aires | France |
| 1975-09-21 | Uruguay | 30 | 15 | Colegio San José | Asunción | Argentina |
| 1975-09-25 | Paraguay | 93 | 0 | Colegio San José | Asunción | Argentina |
| 1975-09-27 | Brazil | 64 | 6 | Colegio San José | Asunción | Argentina |
| 1975-09-28 | Chile | 45 | 3 | Colegio San José | Asunción | Argentina |
| 1975-10-19 | France | 6 | 29 | Stade de Gerland | Lyon | France |
| 1975-10-25 | France | 21 | 36 | Parc des Princes | Paris | France |
| 1976-10-16 | Wales | 19 | 20 | Arms Park | Cardiff | Wales |
| 1976-10-30 | New Zealand | 9 | 21 | Ferrocarrill Oeste | Buenos Aires | New Zealand |
| 1976-11-06 | New Zealand | 6 | 26 | Ferrocarrill Oeste | Buenos Aires | New Zealand |
| 1977-06-25 | France | 3 | 26 | Ferrocarrill Oeste | Buenos Aires | France |
| 1977-07-02 | France | 18 | 18 | Ferrocarrill Oeste | Buenos Aires | Draw |
| 1977-10-25 | Brazil | 78 | 6 | Estadio Monumental José Fierro | Tucumán | Argentina |
| 1977-10-28 | Uruguay | 70 | 0 | Estadio Monumental José Fierro | Tucumán | Argentina |
| 1977-10-29 | Paraguay | 77 | 3 | Estadio Monumental José Fierro | Tucumán | Argentina |
| 1977-10-30 | Chile | 25 | 10 | Estadio Monumental José Fierro | Tucumán | Argentina |
| 1978-10-14 | England | 13 | 13 | Twickenham | London | Draw |
| 1978-10-24 | Italy | 6 | 19 | Stadio Comunale Mario Battaglini | Rovigo | Italy |
| 1979-09-08 | New Zealand | 9 | 18 | Carisbrook | Dunedin | New Zealand |
| 1979-09-15 | New Zealand | 6 | 15 | Athletic Park | Wellington | New Zealand |
| 1979-10-04 | Uruguay | 19 | 16 | Stade Francais | Santiago | Argentina |
| 1979-10-06 | Chile | 34 | 15 | Stade Francais | Santiago | Argentina |
| 1979-10-07 | Paraguay | 76 | 13 | Estadio Sausalito | Viña del Mar | Argentina |
| 1979-10-09 | Brazil | 109 | 3 | Stade Francais | Santiago | Argentina |
| 1979-10-27 | Australia | 24 | 13 | Ferrocarrill Oeste | Buenos Aires | Argentina |
| 1979-11-03 | Australia | 12 | 17 | Ferrocarrill Oeste | Buenos Aires | Australia |

== 1980s ==
| Date | Opponent | F | A | Venue | City | Winner |
|---|---|---|---|---|---|---|
| 1980-08-09 | World XV | 36 | 22 | Ferrocarrill Oeste | Buenos Aires | Argentina |
| 1980-11-01 | Fiji | 34 | 22 | Ferrocarrill Oeste | Buenos Aires | Argentina |
| 1980-11-08 | Fiji | 38 | 16 | Ferrocarrill Oeste | Buenos Aires | Argentina |
| 1981-05-30 | England | 19 | 19 | Ferrocarrill Oeste | Buenos Aires | Draw |
| 1981-06-06 | England | 6 | 12 | Ferrocarrill Oeste | Buenos Aires | England |
| 1981-10-03 | Canada | 35 | 0 | Gimnasia y Esgrima | Buenos Aires | Argentina |
| 1982-11-14 | France | 12 | 25 | Stade de Toulouse | Toulouse | France |
| 1982-11-20 | France | 6 | 13 | Parc des Princes | Paris | France |
| 1982-11-23 | Spain | 28 | 19 | Campo Universitario | Madrid | Argentina |
| 1983-06-25 | World XV | 28 | 20 | Atlanta Stadium | Buenos Aires | Argentina |
| 1983-07-16 | Chile | 46 | 6 | CA San Isidro | San Isidro | Argentina |
| 1983-07-20 | Paraguay | 43 | 3 | CA San Isidro | San Isidro | Argentina |
| 1983-07-23 | Uruguay | 29 | 6 | CA San Isidro | San Isidro | Argentina |
| 1983-07-31 | Australia | 18 | 3 | Ballymore Stadium | Brisbane | Argentina |
| 1983-08-07 | Australia | 13 | 29 | Sydney Cricket Ground | Sydney | Australia |
| 1985-06-22 | France | 24 | 16 | Ferrocarrill Oeste | Buenos Aires | Argentina |
| 1985-06-29 | France | 15 | 23 | Ferrocarrill Oeste | Buenos Aires | France |
| 1985-09-17 | Uruguay | 63 | 16 | Estadio General Pablo Rojas | Asunción | Argentina |
| 1985-09-19 | Chile | 59 | 6 | Estadio General Pablo Rojas | Asunción | Argentina |
| 1985-09-21 | Paraguay | 102 | 3 | Estadio General Pablo Rojas | Asunción | Argentina |
| 1985-10-26 | New Zealand | 20 | 33 | Ferrocarrill Oeste | Buenos Aires | New Zealand |
| 1985-11-02 | New Zealand | 21 | 21 | Ferrocarrill Oeste | Buenos Aires | Draw |
| 1986-05-31 | France | 15 | 13 | José Amalfitani Stadium | Buenos Aires | Argentina |
| 1986-06-07 | France | 9 | 22 | José Amalfitani Stadium | Buenos Aires | France |
| 1986-07-06 | Australia | 19 | 39 | Ballymore Stadium | Brisbane | Australia |
| 1986-07-12 | Australia | 0 | 26 | Sydney Cricket Ground | Sydney | Australia |
| 1987-05-03 | Uruguay | 38 | 3 | Estadio Gran Parque Central | Montevideo | Argentina |
| 1987-05-24 | Fiji | 9 | 28 | Rugby Park | Hamilton | Fiji |
| 1987-05-28 | Italy | 25 | 16 | Lancaster Park | Christchurch | Argentina |
| 1987-06-01 | New Zealand | 15 | 46 | Athletic Park | Wellington | New Zealand |
| 1987-08-17 | Spain | 40 | 12 | Estadio José María Minella | Mar del Plata | Argentina |
| 1987-09-27 | Uruguay | 41 | 21 | Stade Francais | Santiago | Argentina |
| 1987-09-30 | Paraguay | 62 | 4 | Stade Francais | Santiago | Argentina |
| 1987-10-03 | Chile | 47 | 9 | Stade Francais | Santiago | Argentina |
| 1987-10-31 | Australia | 19 | 19 | José Amalfitani Stadium | Buenos Aires | Draw |
| 1987-11-07 | Australia | 27 | 19 | José Amalfitani Stadium | Buenos Aires | Argentina |
| 1988-06-18 | France | 15 | 18 | José Amalfitani Stadium | Buenos Aires | Argentina |
| 1988-06-25 | France | 18 | 6 | José Amalfitani Stadium | Buenos Aires | Argentina |
| 1988-11-05 | France | 9 | 29 | La Beaujoire | Nantes | France |
| 1988-11-11 | France | 18 | 28 | Métropole | Lille | France |
| 1989-06-24 | Italy | 21 | 16 | José Amalfitani Stadium | Buenos Aires | Argentina |
| 1989-07-15 | New Zealand | 9 | 60 | Carisbrook | Dunedin | New Zealand |
| 1989-07-29 | New Zealand | 12 | 49 | Athletic Park | Wellington | New Zealand |
| 1989-10-08 | Brazil | 103 | 9 | Estadio Charrúa | Montevideo | Argentina |
| 1989-10-10 | Chile | 36 | 9 | Estadio Charrúa | Montevideo | Argentina |
| 1989-10-12 | Paraguay | 75 | 7 | Estadio Charrúa | Montevideo | Argentina |
| 1989-10-14 | Uruguay | 34 | 14 | Estadio Charrúa | Montevideo | Argentina |
| 1989-11-08 | United States | 23 | 6 | José Amalfitani Stadium | Buenos Aires | Argentina |

== 1990s ==
| Date | Opponent | F | A | Venue | City | Winner |
|---|---|---|---|---|---|---|
| 1990-03-30 | Canada | 6 | 15 | Burnaby Lake Sports Complex | Burnaby | Canada |
| 1990-04-07 | United States | 13 | 6 | | Santa Barbara | Argentina |
| 1990-06-16 | Canada | 15 | 19 | José Amalfitani Stadium | Buenos Aires | Canada |
| 1990-07-28 | England | 12 | 25 | José Amalfitani Stadium | Buenos Aires | England |
| 1990-08-04 | England | 15 | 13 | José Amalfitani Stadium | Buenos Aires | Argentina |
| 1990-10-27 | Ireland | 18 | 20 | Lansdowne Road | Dublin | Ireland |
| 1990-11-03 | England | 0 | 51 | Twickenham Stadium | London | England |
| 1990-11-10 | Scotland | 3 | 49 | Murrayfield Stadium | Edinburgh | Scotland |
| 1990-11-17 | Barbarians | 34 | 22 | Arms Park | Cardiff | Argentina |
| 1991-07-06 | New Zealand | 14 | 28 | José Amalfitani Stadium | Buenos Aires | New Zealand |
| 1991-07-13 | New Zealand | 6 | 36 | José Amalfitani Stadium | Buenos Aires | New Zealand |
| 1991-08-15 | Chile | 41 | 6 | Prince of Wales Country Club | Santiago | Argentina |
| 1991-09-21 | Uruguay | 23 | 9 | CA San Isidro | San Isidro | Argentina |
| 1991-09-28 | Paraguay | 37 | 10 | Colegio San José | Asunción | Argentina |
| 1991-10-01 | Brazil | 84 | 6 | Belgrano Athletic Club | Buenos Aires | Argentina |
| 1991-10-04 | Australia | 19 | 32 | Stradey Park | Llanelli | Australia |
| 1991-10-09 | Wales | 7 | 16 | Cardiff Arms Park | Cardiff | Wales |
| 1991-10-13 | Samoa | 12 | 35 | Sardis Road | Pontypridd | Samoa |
| 1992-07-04 | France | 12 | 27 | José Amalfitani Stadium | Buenos Aires | France |
| 1992-07-11 | France | 9 | 33 | José Amalfitani Stadium | Buenos Aires | France |
| 1992-09-26 | Spain | 38 | 10 | José Amalfitani Stadium | Buenos Aires | Argentina |
| 1992-10-24 | Spain | 43 | 34 | Ciudad Universitaria | Madrid | Argentina |
| 1992-10-31 | Romania | 21 | 18 | Stadionul Dinamo | Bucharest | Argentina |
| 1992-11-14 | France | 24 | 20 | Stade Marcel Saupin | Nantes | Argentina |
| 1993-05-15 | Japan | 30 | 27 | Estadio Monumental José Fierro | Tucumán | Argentina |
| 1993-05-22 | Japan | 45 | 20 | Ferrocarrill Oeste | Buenos Aires | Argentina |
| 1993-10-02 | Brazil | 114 | 3 | São Paulo Athletic Club | São Paulo | Argentina |
| 1993-10-11 | Chile | 70 | 7 | Gimnasia y Esgrima | Buenos Aires | Argentina |
| 1993-10-16 | Paraguay | 51 | 3 | Gimnasia y Esgrima | Buenos Aires | Argentina |
| 1993-10-23 | Uruguay | 19 | 10 | Estadio Gran Parque Central | Montevideo | Argentina |
| 1993-11-06 | South Africa | 26 | 29 | Ferrocarrill Oeste | Buenos Aires | South Africa |
| 1993-11-13 | South Africa | 23 | 52 | Ferrocarrill Oeste | Buenos Aires | South Africa |
| 1994-05-28 | United States | 28 | 22 | George Allen Field | Long Beach | Argentina |
| 1994-06-04 | Scotland | 16 | 15 | Ferrocarrill Oeste | Buenos Aires | Argentina |
| 1994-06-11 | Scotland | 19 | 17 | Ferrocarrill Oeste | Buenos Aires | Argentina |
| 1994-06-20 | United States | 16 | 11 | Ferrocarrill Oeste | Buenos Aires | Argentina |
| 1994-10-08 | South Africa | 22 | 42 | EPRU Stadium | Port Elizabeth | South Africa |
| 1994-10-15 | South Africa | 26 | 46 | Ellis Park Stadium | Johannesburg | South Africa |
| 1995-03-04 | Uruguay | 44 | 3 | Ferrocarrill Oeste | Buenos Aires | Argentina |
| 1995-03-10 | Canada | 29 | 26 | Ferrocarrill Oeste | Buenos Aires | Argentina |
| 1995-04-30 | Australia | 7 | 53 | Ballymore Stadium | Brisbane | Australia |
| 1995-05-06 | Australia | 13 | 30 | Sydney Football Stadium | Sydney | Australia |
| 1995-05-27 | England | 18 | 24 | Kings Park Stadium | Durban | England |
| 1995-05-30 | Samoa | 26 | 32 | Buffalo City Stadium | East London | Samoa |
| 1995-06-04 | Italy | 25 | 31 | Buffalo City Stadium | East London | Italy |
| 1995-09-24 | Paraguay | 103 | 9 | Estadio de la Fuerzas | Asunción | Argentina |
| 1995-09-30 | Chile | 78 | 3 | Prince of Wales Country Club | Santiago | Argentina |
| 1995-10-08 | Uruguay | 52 | 37 | Tucarù Social Club | Posadas | Argentina |
| 1995-10-14 | Romania | 51 | 16 | Ferrocarrill Oeste | Buenos Aires | Argentina |
| 1995-10-17 | Italy | 26 | 6 | Estadio Monumental José Fierro | Tucumán | Argentina |
| 1995-10-21 | France | 12 | 47 | Ferrocarrill Oeste | Buenos Aires | France |
| 1996-06-08 | Uruguay | 37 | 18 | Carrasco Polo Club | Montevideo | Argentina |
| 1996-06-22 | France | 27 | 34 | Ferrocarrill Oeste | Buenos Aires | France |
| 1996-06-29 | France | 15 | 34 | Ferrocarrill Oeste | Buenos Aires | France |
| 1996-09-14 | United States | 29 | 26 | Twin Elm Rugby Park | Nepean | Argentina |
| 1996-09-18 | Uruguay | 54 | 20 | Mohawk Sports Park | Hamilton | Argentina |
| 1996-09-21 | Canada | 41 | 21 | Fletcher's Fields | Markham | Argentina |
| 1996-11-09 | South Africa | 15 | 46 | Ferrocarrill Oeste | Buenos Aires | South Africa |
| 1996-11-16 | South Africa | 21 | 44 | Ferrocarrill Oeste | Buenos Aires | South Africa |
| 1996-12-14 | England | 18 | 20 | Twickenham Stadium | London | England |
| 1997-05-31 | England | 20 | 46 | Ferrocarrill Oeste | Buenos Aires | England |
| 1997-06-07 | England | 33 | 13 | Ferrocarrill Oeste | Buenos Aires | Argentina |
| 1997-06-21 | New Zealand | 8 | 93 | Athletic Park | Wellington | New Zealand |
| 1997-06-28 | New Zealand | 10 | 62 | Rugby Park | Hamilton | New Zealand |
| 1997-09-13 | Paraguay | 78 | 0 | Aranduroga Rugby Club | Corrientes | Argentina |
| 1997-09-27 | Uruguay | 56 | 17 | Carrasco Polo Club | Montevideo | Argentina |
| 1997-10-04 | Chile | 50 | 10 | Marista Rugby Club | Mendoza | Argentina |
| 1997-10-18 | Romania | 45 | 18 | Stade du Moulias | Auch | Argentina |
| 1997-10-22 | Italy | 18 | 18 | Stade Antoine-Beguere | Lourdes | Draw |
| 1997-10-26 | France | 27 | 32 | Stade Maurice Trélut | Tarbes | France |
| 1997-11-01 | Australia | 15 | 23 | Ferrocarrill Oeste | Buenos Aires | Australia |
| 1997-11-08 | Australia | 18 | 16 | Ferrocarrill Oeste | Buenos Aires | Argentina |
| 1998-06-13 | France | 18 | 35 | José Amalfitani Stadium | Buenos Aires | France |
| 1998-06-20 | France | 12 | 37 | José Amalfitani Stadium | Buenos Aires | France |
| 1998-08-08 | Romania | 68 | 22 | Centro Cordoba | Rosario | Argentina |
| 1998-08-15 | United States | 52 | 24 | Buenos Aires Cricket & Rugby Club | Buenos Aires | Argentina |
| 1998-08-18 | Uruguay | 55 | 0 | CA San Isidro | San Isidro | Argentina |
| 1998-08-22 | Canada | 54 | 28 | Buenos Aires Cricket & Rugby Club | Buenos Aires | Argentina |
| 1998-09-15 | Japan | 29 | 44 | Chichibunomiya Rugby Stadium | Tokyo | Japan |
| 1998-10-03 | Paraguay | 59 | 0 | Colegio San José | Asunción | Argentina |
| 1998-10-10 | Chile | 25 | 17 | Prince of Wales Country Club | Santiago | Argentina |
| 1998-10-17 | Uruguay | 30 | 14 | CA San Isidro | San Isidro | Argentina |
| 1998-11-07 | Italy | 19 | 23 | Stadio Comunale Beltrametti | Piacenza | Italy |
| 1998-11-14 | France | 14 | 34 | Stade Marcel Saupin | Nantes | France |
| 1998-11-21 | Wales | 30 | 43 | Stradey Park | Llanelli | Wales |
| 1999-04-17 | World XV | 49 | 31 | Atlanta Stadium | Buenos Aires | Argentina |
| 1999-06-05 | Wales | 26 | 36 | Ferrocarrill Oeste | Buenos Aires | Wales |
| 1999-06-12 | Wales | 16 | 23 | Ferrocarrill Oeste | Buenos Aires | Wales |
| 1999-08-21 | Scotland | 31 | 22 | Murrayfield Stadium | Edinburgh | Argentina |
| 1999-08-28 | Ireland | 24 | 32 | Lansdowne Road | Dublin | Ireland |
| 1999-10-01 | Wales | 18 | 23 | Millennium Stadium | Cardiff | Wales |
| 1999-10-10 | Samoa | 32 | 16 | Stradey Park | Llanelli | Argentina |
| 1999-10-16 | Japan | 33 | 12 | Millennium Stadium | Cardiff | Argentina |
| 1999-10-20 | Ireland | 28 | 24 | Stade Bollaert-Delelis | Lens | Argentina |
| 1999-10-24 | France | 26 | 47 | Lansdowne Road | Dublin | France |

== 2000s ==
| Date | Opponent | F | A | Venue | City | Winner |
|---|---|---|---|---|---|---|
| 2000-06-03 | Ireland | 34 | 23 | Ferrocarrill Oeste | Buenos Aires | Argentina |
| 2000-06-17 | Australia | 6 | 53 | Ballymore Stadium | Brisbane | Australia |
| 2000-06-24 | Australia | 25 | 32 | Canberra Stadium | Canberra | Australia |
| 2000-11-12 | South Africa | 33 | 37 | Estadio Monumental Antonio Vespucio Liberti | Buenos Aires | South Africa |
| 2000-11-25 | England | 0 | 19 | Twickenham Stadium | London | England |
| 2001-05-19 | Uruguay | 32 | 27 | Richardson Stadium | Kingston | Argentina |
| 2001-05-23 | United States | 44 | 16 | Mohawk Sports Park | Hamilton | Argentina |
| 2001-05-26 | Canada | 20 | 6 | Fletcher's Fields | Markham | Argentina |
| 2001-06-23 | New Zealand | 19 | 67 | Lancaster Park | Christchurch | New Zealand |
| 2001-07-14 | Italy | 38 | 17 | Ferrocarrill Oeste | Buenos Aires | Argentina |
| 2001-11-10 | Wales | 30 | 16 | Millennium Stadium | Cardiff | Argentina |
| 2001-11-18 | Scotland | 25 | 16 | Murrayfield Stadium | Edinburgh | Argentina |
| 2001-12-01 | New Zealand | 20 | 24 | Estadio Monumental Antonio Vespucio Liberti | Buenos Aires | New Zealand |
| 2002-04-28 | Uruguay | 35 | 21 | Marista Rugby Club | Mendoza | Argentina |
| 2002-05-01 | Paraguay | 152 | 0 | Marista Rugby Club | Mendoza | Argentina |
| 2002-05-04 | Chile | 57 | 13 | Marista Rugby Club | Mendoza | Argentina |
| 2002-06-15 | France | 28 | 27 | José Amalfitani Stadium | Buenos Aires | Argentina |
| 2002-06-22 | England | 18 | 26 | José Amalfitani Stadium | Buenos Aires | England |
| 2002-06-29 | South Africa | 29 | 49 | PAM Brink Stadium | Springs | South Africa |
| 2002-11-02 | Australia | 6 | 17 | Estadio Monumental Antonio Vespucio Liberti | Buenos Aires | Australia |
| 2002-11-16 | Italy | 36 | 6 | Stadio Flaminio | Rome | Argentina |
| 2002-11-23 | Ireland | 7 | 16 | Lansdowne Road | Dublin | Ireland |
| 2003-04-27 | Paraguay | 144 | 0 | Estadio Luis Franzini | Montevideo | Argentina |
| 2003-04-30 | Chile | 49 | 3 | Estadio Luis Franzini | Montevideo | Argentina |
| 2003-05-03 | Uruguay | 32 | 0 | Estadio Luis Franzini | Montevideo | Argentina |
| 2003-06-14 | France | 10 | 6 | José Amalfitani Stadium | Buenos Aires | Argentina |
| 2003-06-20 | France | 33 | 32 | José Amalfitani Stadium | Buenos Aires | Argentina |
| 2003-06-28 | South Africa | 25 | 26 | EPRU Stadium | Port Elizabeth | South Africa |
| 2003-08-18 | Fiji | 49 | 30 | Estadio Mario Alberto Kempes | Córdoba | Argentina |
| 2003-08-23 | United States | 42 | 8 | Buenos Aires Cricket & Rugby Club | Buenos Aires | Argentina |
| 2003-08-27 | Uruguay | 57 | 0 | CA San Isidro | San Isidro | Argentina |
| 2003-08-30 | Canada | 62 | 22 | Buenos Aires Cricket & Rugby Club | Buenos Aires | Argentina |
| 2003-10-10 | Australia | 8 | 24 | Stadium Australia | Sydney | Australia |
| 2003-10-14 | Namibia | 67 | 14 | Central Coast Stadium | Gosford | Argentina |
| 2003-10-22 | Romania | 50 | 3 | Sydney Football Stadium | Sydney | Argentina |
| 2003-10-26 | Ireland | 15 | 16 | Adelaide Oval | Adelaide | Ireland |
| 2004-04-25 | Chile | 45 | 3 | Prince of Wales Country Club | Santiago | Argentina |
| 2004-04-28 | Uruguay | 69 | 10 | Prince of Wales Country Club | Santiago | Argentina |
| 2004-05-01 | Venezuela | 147 | 7 | Prince of Wales Country Club | Santiago | Argentina |
| 2004-06-12 | Wales | 50 | 44 | Estadio Monumental José Fierro | Tucumán | Argentina |
| 2004-06-19 | Wales | 20 | 35 | José Amalfitani Stadium | Buenos Aires | Wales |
| 2004-06-26 | New Zealand | 7 | 41 | Waikato Stadium | Hamilton | New Zealand |
| 2004-11-20 | France | 24 | 14 | Stade Vélodrome | Marseille | Argentina |
| 2004-11-27 | Ireland | 19 | 21 | Lansdowne Road | Dublin | Ireland |
| 2004-12-04 | South Africa | 7 | 39 | José Amalfitani Stadium | Buenos Aires | South Africa |
| 2005-04-23 | Japan | 68 | 36 | Buenos Aires Cricket & Rugby Club | Buenos Aires | Argentina |
| 2005-05-08 | Chile | 48 | 13 | Club Monte Grande | Buenos Aires | Argentina |
| 2005-05-15 | Uruguay | 27 | 21 | Club Los Materos | Buenos Aires | Argentina |
| 2005-05-23 | British and Irish Lions | 25 | 25 | Millennium Stadium | Cardiff | Draw |
| 2005-06-11 | Italy | 35 | 21 | Estadio Padre Ernesto Martearena | Salta | Argentina |
| 2005-06-17 | Italy | 29 | 30 | Estadio Mario Alberto Kempes | Córdoba | Italy |
| 2005-11-05 | South Africa | 23 | 34 | José Amalfitani Stadium | Buenos Aires | South Africa |
| 2005-11-12 | Scotland | 23 | 19 | Murrayfield Stadium | Edinburgh | Argentina |
| 2005-11-19 | Italy | 39 | 22 | Stadio Luigi Ferraris | Genoa | Argentina |
| 2005-12-03 | Samoa | 12 | 28 | Buenos Aires Cricket & Rugby Club | Buenos Aires | Samoa |
| 2006-06-11 | Wales | 27 | 25 | Estadio Raúl Conti | Puerto Madryn | Argentina |
| 2006-06-17 | Wales | 45 | 27 | José Amalfitani Stadium | Buenos Aires | Argentina |
| 2006-06-24 | New Zealand | 19 | 25 | Ferrocarrill Oeste | Buenos Aires | New Zealand |
| 2006-07-01 | Chile | 60 | 13 | Prince of Wales Country Club | Santiago | Argentina |
| 2006-07-08 | Uruguay | 26 | 0 | CA San Isidro | San Isidro | Argentina |
| 2006-11-11 | England | 25 | 18 | Twickenham Stadium | London | Argentina |
| 2006-11-18 | Italy | 23 | 16 | Stadio Flaminio | Rome | Argentina |
| 2006-11-25 | France | 26 | 27 | Stade de France | Saint-Denis | France |
| 2007-05-26 | Ireland | 22 | 20 | Estadio Brigadier General Estanislao López | Santa Fe | Argentina |
| 2007-06-02 | Ireland | 16 | 0 | José Amalfitani Stadium | Buenos Aires | Argentina |
| 2007-06-09 | Italy | 24 | 6 | Estadio Malvinas Argentinas | Mendoza | Argentina |
| 2007-08-18 | Wales | 20 | 27 | Millennium Stadium | Cardiff | Wales |
| 2007-08-25 | Belgium | 36 | 8 | Stade Roi Baudouin | Brussels | Argentina |
| 2007-09-07 | France | 17 | 12 | Stade de France | Saint-Denis | Argentina |
| 2007-09-11 | Georgia | 33 | 3 | Stade de Gerland | Lyon | Argentina |
| 2007-09-22 | Namibia | 63 | 3 | Stade Vélodrome | Marseille | Argentina |
| 2007-09-30 | Ireland | 30 | 15 | Parc des Princes | Paris | Argentina |
| 2007-10-07 | Scotland | 19 | 13 | Stade de France | Saint-Denis | Argentina |
| 2007-10-14 | South Africa | 13 | 37 | Stade de France | Saint-Denis | South Africa |
| 2007-10-19 | France | 34 | 10 | Parc des Princes | Paris | Argentina |
| 2007-12-15 | Chile | 79 | 8 | Estadio de San Juan | San Juan | Argentina |
| 2008-05-31 | Uruguay | 43 | 8 | Estadio Charrúa | Montevideo | Argentina |
| 2008-06-07 | Scotland | 21 | 15 | Estadio Gigante de Arroyito | Rosario | Argentina |
| 2008-06-14 | Scotland | 14 | 26 | José Amalfitani Stadium | Buenos Aires | Scotland |
| 2008-06-28 | Italy | 12 | 13 | Estadio Mario Alberto Kempes | Córdoba | Italy |
| 2008-08-09 | South Africa | 9 | 63 | Ellis Park Stadium | Johannesburg | South Africa |
| 2008-11-08 | Chile | 71 | 3 | Prince of Wales Country Club | Santiago | Argentina |
| 2008-11-08 | France | 6 | 12 | Stade Vélodrome | Marseille | France |
| 2008-11-15 | Italy | 22 | 14 | Stadio Olimpico Grande Torino | Turin | Argentina |
| 2008-11-22 | Ireland | 3 | 17 | Croke Park | Dublin | Ireland |
| 2009-06-06 | England | 15 | 37 | Old Trafford | Manchester | England |
| 2009-06-13 | England | 24 | 22 | Estadio Padre Ernesto Martearena | Salta | Argentina |
| 2009-11-14 | England | 9 | 16 | Twickenham Stadium | London | England |
| 2009-11-21 | Wales | 16 | 33 | Millennium Stadium | Cardiff | Wales |
| 2009-11-28 | Scotland | 9 | 6 | Murrayfield Stadium | Edinburgh | Argentina |

== 2010s ==
| Date | Opponent | F | A | Venue | City | Winner |
|---|---|---|---|---|---|---|
| 2010-05-21 | Uruguay | 38 | 0 | Mahuida Parque Reina | Santiago | Argentina |
| 2010-05-23 | Chile | 48 | 9 | Mahuida Parque Reina | Santiago | Argentina |
| 2010-06-12 | Scotland | 16 | 24 | Estadio Monumental José Fierro | Tucumán | Scotland |
| 2010-06-19 | Scotland | 9 | 13 | Estadio José María Minella | Mar del Plata | Scotland |
| 2010-06-26 | France | 41 | 13 | José Amalfitani Stadium | Buenos Aires | Argentina |
| 2010-11-13 | Italy | 22 | 16 | Stadio Marcantonio Bentegodi | Verona | Argentina |
| 2010-11-20 | France | 9 | 15 | Stade de la Mosson | Montpellier | France |
| 2010-11-28 | Ireland | 9 | 29 | Aviva Stadium | Dublin | Ireland |
| 2011-05-22 | Chile | 61 | 6 | Cataratas Rugby Club | Puerto Iguazú | Argentina |
| 2011-05-25 | Uruguay | 75 | 14 | Club Capri | Posadas | Argentina |
| 2011-08-20 | Wales | 13 | 28 | Millennium Stadium | Cardiff | Wales |
| 2011-09-10 | England | 9 | 13 | Forsyth Barr Stadium | Dunedin | England |
| 2011-09-17 | Romania | 43 | 8 | Rugby Park Stadium | Invercargill | Argentina |
| 2011-09-25 | Scotland | 13 | 12 | Wellington Regional Stadium | Wellington | Argentina |
| 2011-10-02 | Georgia | 25 | 7 | FMG Stadium | Palmerston North | Argentina |
| 2011-10-09 | New Zealand | 10 | 33 | Eden Park | Auckland | New Zealand |
| 2012-05-20 | Uruguay | 40 | 5 | Mahuida Parque Reina | Santiago | Argentina |
| 2012-05-23 | Brazil | 111 | 0 | Mahuida Parque Reina | Santiago | Argentina |
| 2012-05-26 | Chile | 59 | 6 | Mahuida Parque Reina | Santiago | Argentina |
| 2012-06-09 | Italy | 37 | 22 | Estadio San Juan del Bicentenario | San Juan | Argentina |
| 2012-06-16 | France | 23 | 20 | Estadio Mario Alberto Kempes | Córdoba | Argentina |
| 2012-06-23 | France | 10 | 49 | Estadio Monumental José Fierro | Tucumán | France |
| 2012-08-18 | South Africa | 6 | 27 | Newlands Stadium | Cape Town | South Africa |
| 2012-08-25 | South Africa | 16 | 16 | Estadio Malvinas Argentinas | Mendoza | Draw |
| 2012-09-08 | New Zealand | 5 | 21 | Wellington Regional Stadium | Wellington | New Zealand |
| 2012-09-15 | Australia | 19 | 23 | Robina Stadium | Gold Coast | Australia |
| 2012-09-29 | New Zealand | 15 | 54 | Estadio Ciudad de La Plata | La Plata | New Zealand |
| 2012-10-06 | Australia | 19 | 25 | Estadio Gigante de Arroyito | Rosario | Australia |
| 2012-11-10 | Wales | 26 | 12 | Millennium Stadium | Cardiff | Argentina |
| 2012-11-17 | France | 22 | 39 | Stade Pierre-Mauroy | Lille | France |
| 2012-11-24 | Ireland | 24 | 46 | Aviva Stadium | Dublin | Ireland |
| 2013-04-27 | Uruguay | 29 | 18 | Estadio Charrúa | Montevideo | Argentina |
| 2013-05-01 | Chile | 85 | 10 | Estadio Charrúa | Montevideo | Argentina |
| 2013-05-04 | Brazil | 83 | 0 | Estadio Charrúa | Montevideo | Argentina |
| 2013-06-08 | England | 3 | 32 | Estadio Padre Ernesto Martearena | Salta | England |
| 2013-06-15 | England | 26 | 51 | José Amalfitani Stadium | Buenos Aires | England |
| 2013-06-22 | Georgia | 29 | 18 | Estadio San Juan del Bicentenario | San Juan | Argentina |
| 2013-08-17 | South Africa | 13 | 73 | FNB Stadium | Johannesburg | South Africa |
| 2013-08-24 | South Africa | 17 | 22 | Estadio Malvinas Argentinas | Mendoza | South Africa |
| 2013-09-07 | New Zealand | 13 | 28 | Waikato Stadium | Hamilton | New Zealand |
| 2013-09-14 | Australia | 13 | 14 | Subiaco Oval | Perth | Australia |
| 2013-09-28 | New Zealand | 15 | 33 | Estadio Ciudad de La Plata | La Plata | New Zealand |
| 2013-10-05 | Australia | 17 | 54 | Estadio Gigante de Arroyito | Rosario | Australia |
| 2013-11-09 | England | 12 | 31 | Twickenham Stadium | London | England |
| 2013-11-16 | Wales | 6 | 40 | Millennium Stadium | Cardiff | Wales |
| 2013-11-23 | Italy | 19 | 14 | Stadio Olimpico | Rome | Argentina |
| 2014-05-17 | Uruguay | 65 | 9 | Estadio Parque Artigas | Paysandú | Argentina |
| 2014-05-25 | Chile | 73 | 12 | Estadio San Carlos de Apoquindo | Santiago | Argentina |
| 2014-06-07 | Ireland | 17 | 29 | Estadio Centenario | Resistencia | Ireland |
| 2014-06-14 | Ireland | 17 | 23 | Estadio Monumental José Fierro | Tucumán | Ireland |
| 2014-06-20 | Scotland | 19 | 21 | Estadio Mario Alberto Kempes | Córdoba | Scotland |
| 2014-08-16 | South Africa | 6 | 13 | Loftus Versfeld Stadium | Pretoria | South Africa |
| 2014-08-23 | South Africa | 31 | 33 | Estadio Padre Ernesto Martearena | Salta | South Africa |
| 2014-09-06 | New Zealand | 9 | 28 | McLean Park | Napier | New Zealand |
| 2014-09-13 | Australia | 25 | 32 | Robina Stadium | Gold Coast | Australia |
| 2014-09-27 | New Zealand | 13 | 34 | Estadio Ciudad de La Plata | La Plata | New Zealand |
| 2014-10-04 | Australia | 21 | 17 | Estadio Malvinas Argentinas | Mendoza | Argentina |
| 2014-11-08 | Scotland | 31 | 41 | Murrayfield Stadium | Edinburgh | Scotland |
| 2014-11-14 | Italy | 20 | 18 | Stadio Luigi Ferraris | Genoa | Argentina |
| 2014-11-22 | France | 18 | 13 | Stade de France | Saint-Denis | Argentina |
| 2015-05-16 | Uruguay | 36 | 14 | Estadio Charrúa | Montevideo | Argentina |
| 2015-05-23 | Paraguay | 71 | 7 | Estadio Héroes de Curupayty | Asunción | Argentina |
| 2015-07-17 | New Zealand | 18 | 39 | Rugby League Park | Christchurch | New Zealand |
| 2015-07-25 | Australia | 9 | 34 | Estadio Malvinas Argentinas | Mendoza | Australia |
| 2015-08-08 | South Africa | 37 | 25 | Kings Park Stadium | Durban | Argentina |
| 2015-08-15 | South Africa | 12 | 26 | José Amalfitani Stadium | Buenos Aires | South Africa |
| 2015-09-20 | New Zealand | 16 | 26 | Wembley Stadium | London | New Zealand |
| 2015-09-25 | Georgia | 54 | 9 | Kingsholm Stadium | Gloucester | Argentina |
| 2015-10-04 | Tonga | 45 | 16 | King Power Stadium | Leicester | Argentina |
| 2015-10-11 | Namibia | 64 | 19 | King Power Stadium | Leicester | Argentina |
| 2015-10-18 | Ireland | 43 | 20 | Millennium Stadium | Cardiff | Argentina |
| 2015-10-25 | Australia | 15 | 29 | Twickenham Stadium | London | Australia |
| 2015-10-30 | South Africa | 13 | 24 | London Stadium | London | South Africa |
| 2015-11-21 | Barbarians F.C. | 49 | 31 | Twickenham | London | Argentina |
| 2016-06-11 | Italy | 30 | 24 | Estadio Brigadier General Estanislao López | Santa Fe | Argentina |
| 2016-06-19 | France | 30 | 19 | Estadio Monumental José Fierro | Tucumán | Argentina |
| 2016-06-25 | France | 0 | 27 | Estadio Monumental José Fierro | Tucumán | France |
| 2016-08-20 | South Africa | 23 | 30 | Mbombela Stadium | Mbombela | South Africa |
| 2016-08-27 | South Africa | 26 | 24 | Estadio Padre Ernesto Martearena | Salta | Argentina |
| 2016-09-10 | New Zealand | 22 | 57 | Waikato Stadium | Hamilton | New Zealand |
| 2016-09-17 | Australia | 20 | 36 | Perth Oval | Perth | Australia |
| 2016-10-01 | New Zealand | 17 | 36 | José Amalfitani Stadium | Buenos Aires | New Zealand |
| 2016-10-08 | Australia | 21 | 33 | Twickenham Stadium | London | Australia |
| 2016-11-05 | Japan | 54 | 20 | Chichibunomiya Rugby Stadium | Tokyo | Argentina |
| 2016-11-12 | Wales | 20 | 24 | Millennium Stadium | Cardiff | Wales |
| 2016-11-19 | Scotland | 16 | 19 | Murrayfield Stadium | Edinburgh | Scotland |
| 2016-11-26 | England | 14 | 27 | Twickenham Stadium | London | England |
| 2017-06-10 | England | 34 | 38 | Estadio San Juan del Bicentenario | San Juan | England |
| 2017-06-17 | England | 25 | 35 | Estadio Brigadier General Estanislao López | Santa Fe | England |
| 2017-06-24 | Georgia | 45 | 29 | Estadio 23 de Agosto | San Salvador de Jujuy | Argentina |
| 2017-08-19 | South Africa | 15 | 37 | Nelson Mandela Bay Stadium | Port Elizabeth | South Africa |
| 2017-08-26 | South Africa | 23 | 41 | Estadio Padre Ernesto Martearena | Salta | South Africa |
| 2017-09-09 | New Zealand | 22 | 39 | Yarrow Stadium | New Plymouth | New Zealand |
| 2017-09-16 | Australia | 20 | 45 | Canberra Stadium | Canberra | Australia |
| 2017-09-30 | New Zealand | 10 | 36 | José Amalfitani Stadium | Buenos Aires | New Zealand |
| 2017-10-07 | Australia | 20 | 37 | Estadio Malvinas Argentinas | Mendoza | Australia |
| 2017-11-11 | England | 8 | 21 | Twickenham Stadium | London | England |
| 2017-11-18 | Italy | 31 | 15 | Stadio Artemio Franchi | Florence | Argentina |
| 2017-11-25 | Ireland | 19 | 28 | Aviva Stadium | Dublin | Ireland |
| 2018-06-09 | Wales | 10 | 23 | Estadio San Juan del Bicentenario | San Juan | Wales |
| 2018-06-16 | Wales | 12 | 30 | Estadio Brigadier General Estanislao López | Santa Fe | Wales |
| 2018-06-23 | Scotland | 15 | 44 | Estadio Centenario | Resistencia | Scotland |
| 2018-08-18 | South Africa | 21 | 34 | Kings Park Stadium | Durban | South Africa |
| 2018-08-25 | South Africa | 32 | 19 | Estadio Malvinas Argentinas | Mendoza | Argentina |
| 2018-09-08 | New Zealand | 24 | 46 | Trafalgar Park | Nelson | New Zealand |
| 2018-09-15 | Australia | 23 | 19 | Robina Stadium | Gold Coast | Argentina |
| 2018-09-29 | New Zealand | 17 | 35 | José Amalfitani Stadium | Buenos Aires | New Zealand |
| 2018-10-06 | Australia | 34 | 45 | Estadio Padre Ernesto Martearena | Salta | Australia |
| 2018-11-10 | Ireland | 17 | 28 | Aviva Stadium | Dublin | Ireland |
| 2018-11-17 | France | 13 | 28 | Stade Pierre-Mauroy | Lille | France |
| 2018-11-24 | Scotland | 9 | 14 | Murrayfield Stadium | Edinburgh | Scotland |
| 2018-12-01 | Barbarians F.C. | 35 | 38 | Twickenham | London | Barbarians F.C. |
| 2019-07-20 | New Zealand | 16 | 20 | José Amalfitani Stadium | Buenos Aires | New Zealand |
| 2019-07-27 | Australia | 10 | 16 | Lang Park | Brisbane | Australia |
| 2019-08-10 | South Africa | 13 | 46 | Estadio Padre Ernesto Martearena | Salta | South Africa |
| 2019-08-17 | South Africa | 18 | 24 | Loftus Versfeld Stadium | Pretoria | South Africa |
| 2019-09-21 | France | 21 | 23 | Ajinomoto Stadium | Tokyo | France |
| 2019-09-28 | Tonga | 28 | 12 | Hanazono Rugby Stadium | Osaka | Argentina |
| 2019-10-05 | England | 10 | 39 | Ajinomoto Stadium | Tokyo | England |
| 2019-10-09 | United States | 47 | 17 | Kumagaya Rugby Ground | Kumagaya | Argentina |

== 2020s ==
| Date | Opponent | F | A | Venue | City | Winner |
|---|---|---|---|---|---|---|
| 2020-11-14 | New Zealand | 25 | 15 | Western Sydney Stadium | Sydney | Argentina |
| 2020-11-21 | Australia | 15 | 15 | Newcastle International Sports Centre | Newcastle | Draw |
| 2020-11-28 | New Zealand | 0 | 38 | Newcastle International Sports Centre | Newcastle | New Zealand |
| 2020-12-05 | Australia | 16 | 16 | Western Sydney Stadium | Sydney | Draw |
| 2021-07-03 | Romania | 24 | 17 | Stadionul Arcul de Triumf | Bucharest | Argentina |
| 2021-07-10 | Wales | 20 | 20 | Millennium Stadium | Cardiff | Draw |
| 2021-07-17 | Wales | 33 | 11 | Millennium Stadium | Cardiff | Argentina |
| 2021-08-14 | South Africa | 12 | 32 | Nelson Mandela Bay Stadium | Port Elizabeth | South Africa |
| 2021-08-21 | South Africa | 10 | 29 | Nelson Mandela Bay Stadium | Port Elizabeth | South Africa |
| 2021-09-12 | New Zealand | 0 | 39 | Robina Stadium | Gold Coast | New Zealand |
| 2021-09-18 | New Zealand | 13 | 36 | Lang Park | Brisbane | New Zealand |
| 2021-09-25 | Australia | 8 | 27 | North Queensland Stadium | Townsville | Australia |
| 2021-10-02 | Australia | 17 | 32 | Robina Stadium | Gold Coast | Australia |
| 2021-11-06 | France | 20 | 29 | Stade de France | Saint-Denis | France |
| 2021-11-13 | Italy | 37 | 16 | Stadio Comunale di Monigo | Treviso | Argentina |
| 2021-11-21 | Ireland | 7 | 53 | Aviva Stadium | Dublin | Ireland |
| 2022-07-02 | Scotland | 26 | 18 | Estadio 23 de Agosto | San Salvador de Jujuy | Argentina |
| 2022-07-09 | Scotland | 6 | 29 | Estadio Padre Ernesto Martearena | Salta | Scotland |
| 2022-07-16 | Scotland | 34 | 31 | Estadio Único Madre de Ciudades | Santiago del Estero | Argentina |
| 2022-08-06 | Australia | 26 | 41 | Estadio Malvinas Argentinas | Mendoza | Australia |
| 2022-08-13 | Australia | 48 | 17 | Estadio San Juan del Bicentenario | San Juan | Argentina |
| 2022-08-27 | New Zealand | 25 | 18 | Orangetheory Stadium | Christchurch | Argentina |
| 2022-09-03 | New Zealand | 3 | 53 | Waikato Stadium | Hamilton | New Zealand |
| 2022-09-17 | South Africa | 20 | 36 | José Amalfitani Stadium | Buenos Aires | South Africa |
| 2022-09-24 | South Africa | 21 | 38 | Kings Park Stadium | Durban | South Africa |
| 2022-11-06 | England | 30 | 29 | Twickenham Stadium | London | Argentina |
| 2022-11-12 | Wales | 13 | 20 | Principality Stadium | Cardiff | Wales |
| 2022-11-19 | Scotland | 29 | 52 | Murrayfield Stadium | Edinburgh | Scotland |
| 2023-07-08 | New Zealand | 12 | 41 | Estadio Malvinas Argentinas | Mendoza | New Zealand |
| 2023-07-15 | Australia | 34 | 31 | Western Sydney Stadium | Sydney | Argentina |
| 2023-07-29 | South Africa | 21 | 22 | Ellis Park Stadium | Johannesburg | South Africa |
| 2023-08-05 | South Africa | 13 | 24 | José Amalfitani Stadium | Buenos Aires | South Africa |
| 2023-08-26 | Spain | 62 | 3 | Estadio Metropolitano | Madrid | Argentina |
| 2023-09-09 | England | 10 | 27 | Stade Vélodrome | Marseille | England |
| 2023-09-22 | Samoa | 19 | 10 | Stade Geoffroy-Guichard | Saint-Étienne | Argentina |
| 2023-09-30 | Chile | 59 | 5 | Stade de la Beaujoire | Nantes | Argentina |
| 2023-10-08 | Japan | 39 | 27 | Stade de la Beaujoire | Nantes | Argentina |
| 2023-10-14 | Wales | 29 | 17 | Stade Vélodrome | Marseille | Argentina |
| 2023-10-20 | New Zealand | 6 | 44 | Stade de France | Saint-Denis | New Zealand |
| 2023-10-27 | England | 23 | 26 | Stade de France | Saint-Denis | England |
| 2024-07-06 | France | 13 | 28 | Estadio Malvinas Argentinas | Mendoza | France |
| 2024-07-13 | France | 33 | 25 | Estadio José Amalfitani | Buenos Aires | Argentina |
| 2024-07-20 | Uruguay | 79 | 5 | Estadio Domingo Burgueño | Punta del Este | Argentina |
| 2024-08-10 | New Zealand | 38 | 30 | Wellington Regional Stadium | Wellington | Argentina |
| 2024-08-17 | New Zealand | 10 | 42 | Eden Park | Auckland | New Zealand |
| 2024-08-31 | Australia | 19 | 20 | Estadio Jorge Luis Hirschi | La Plata | Australia |
| 2024-09-07 | Australia | 67 | 27 | Estadio Brigadier General Estanislao López | Santa Fe | Argentina |
| 2024-09-21 | South Africa | 29 | 28 | Estadio Único Madre de Ciudades | Santiago del Estero | Argentina |
| 2024-09-28 | South Africa | 7 | 48 | Mbombela Stadium | Mbombela | South Africa |
| 2024-11-09 | Italy | 50 | 18 | Stadio Friuli | Udine | Argentina |
| 2024-11-15 | Ireland | 19 | 22 | Aviva Stadium | Dublin | Ireland |
| 2024-11-22 | France | 23 | 37 | Stade de France | Saint-Denis | France |
| 2025-06-20 | British & Irish Lions | 28 | 24 | Aviva Stadium | Dublin | Argentina |
| 2025-07-05 | England | 12 | 35 | Estadio Jorge Luis Hirschi | La Plata | England |
| 2025-07-12 | England | 17 | 22 | Estadio San Juan del Bicentenario | San Juan | England |
| 2025-07-19 | Uruguay | 52 | 17 | Estadio Padre Ernesto Martearena | Salta | Argentina |
| 2025-08-16 | New Zealand | 24 | 41 | Estadio Mario Alberto Kempes | Córdoba | New Zealand |
| 2025-08-23 | New Zealand | 29 | 23 | Estadio José Amalfitani | Buenos Aires | Argentina |
| 2025-09-06 | Australia | 24 | 28 | Queensland Country Bank Stadium | Townsville | Australia |
| 2025-09-13 | Australia | 28 | 26 | Allianz Stadium | Sydney | Argentina |
| 2025-09-27 | South Africa | 30 | 67 | Kings Park Stadium | Durban | South Africa |
| 2025-10-04 | South Africa | 27 | 29 | Twickenham Stadium | London | South Africa |
| 2025-11-09 | Wales | 52 | 28 | Millennium Stadium | Cardiff | Argentina |
| 2025-11-16 | Scotland | 33 | 24 | Murrayfield Stadium | Edinburgh | Argentina |
| 2025-11-23 | England | 23 | 27 | Twickenham Stadium | London | England |
| 2026-07-04 | Scotland | 38 | 47 | Estadio Mario Alberto Kempes | Cordoba | Scotland |
| 2026-07-11 | Wales | 35 | 21 | Estadio Bicentenario | San Juan | Argentina |
| 2026-07-18 | England | 24 | 31 | Estadio Único Madre de Ciudades | Santiago del Estero | England |
| 2026-08-08 | South Africa | 10 | 17 | Estadio José Amalfitani | Buenos Aires | South Africa |
| 2026-08-29 | Australia | 21 | 27 | Estadio 23 de Agosto | San Salvador de Jujuy | Australia |
| 2026-09-05 | Australia | 28 | 28 | Estadio Malvinas Argentinas | Mendoza | Draw |
| 2026-11-06 | Ireland | | | Aviva Stadium | Dublin | |
| 2026-11-14 | Italy | | | Stadio Luigi Ferraris | Genoa | |
| 2026-11-21 | France | | | Stade de France | Saint-Denis | |
| 2027-07-10 | Australia | | | Sydney Football Stadium | Sydney | |
| 2027-07-17 | Australia | | | North Queensland Stadium | Townsville | |
| 2027-07-31 | South Africa | | | | | |
| 2027-08 | South Africa | | | | | |
| 2027-08 | New Zealand | | | | | |
| 2027-08 | New Zealand | | | | | |
| 2027-10-04 | Canada | | | Lang Park | Brisbane | |
| 2027-10-10 | Spain | | | Docklands Stadium | Melbourne | |
| 2027-10-16 | Fiji | | | Adelaide Oval | Adelaide | |
