= 2012 in rugby union =

== International competitions ==
- June 4 – June 22: 2012 IRB Junior World Championship in Cape Town and Stellenbosch, South Africa
  - (gold) South Africa
  - (silver) New Zealand
  - (bronze) Wales
  - 4th: Argentina
    - South Africa claim their first title, also marking the first time in the tournament's five-year history that New Zealand fail to win the title.
- June 18 – June 30: 2012 IRB Junior World Rugby Trophy in Salt Lake City, United States
  - (gold) United States
  - (silver) Japan
  - (bronze) Tonga
  - 4th: Georgia
    - The USA win their first title, and are promoted to the 2013 Junior World Championship at the expense of Italy.
- February 4 – 17 March: Six Nations Championship
  - Wales win the championship for the 25th time, also claiming their 11th Grand Slam and 20th Triple Crown.
- May 18: Amlin Challenge Cup Final at The Stoop, London:
  - (France) Biarritz defeat (France) Toulon 21–18 to claim their first Challenge Cup title and first European trophy.
- May 19: Heineken Cup Final at Twickenham, London
  - (Ireland) Leinster crush (Ireland) Ulster 42–14 for their third Heineken Cup, becoming only the second club to successfully defend a Heineken Cup title and the first ever to win the Cup three times in four years.
- 25 November 2011 – 13 May 2012: IRB Sevens World Series:
  - (gold) New Zealand, (silver) Fiji and (bronze) England. New Zealand claim their second consecutive series crown and tenth overall.
- August 4: Super Rugby Final at Waikato Stadium, Hamilton:
  - The (New Zealand) Chiefs crush the (South Africa) Sharks 37–6 to claim their first-ever title.
- August 18 – October 6: The Rugby Championship
  - New Zealand win the title with a clean sweep in the first season of the newly renamed competition, now including Argentina. Including the competition's previous history as the Tri Nations, this is the All Blacks' 11th series win.
- 2012 mid-year rugby test series 5 weeks: 27 May - 24 June
- 2012 end of year rugby union tests 5 weeks: 20 October - 1 December
- 2012 South American Rugby Championship "A"
  - (gold) Argentina
  - (silver) Uruguay
  - (bronze) Chile
  - 4th: Brazil

== Domestic competitions ==
- (England) English Premiership Final, May 26 at Twickenham:
  - Harlequins defeat Leicester Tigers 30–23 to claim their first Premiership title. Quins had also finished atop the league table.
- RFU Championship Final, May 23 and May 30:
  - London Welsh defeat Cornish Pirates 66–41 on aggregate to claim the title. London Welsh were initially denied a place in the Premiership due largely to stadium issues, but successfully appealed the denial, placing them in the Premiership for 2012–13 at the expense of bottom finisher Newcastle Falcons.
- Top 14 Final, June 9 at Stade de France, Saint-Denis:
  - Toulouse defeat Toulon 18–12 and lift the Bouclier de Brennus for the 19th time.
- Rugby Pro D2 — Grenoble automatically promoted to Top 14 as champion. Mont-de-Marsan defeat Pau 29–20 in the playoff final to claim the second promotion place. These teams replace Brive and Lyon, which finished on the bottom of the Top 14 table.
- (Ireland) (Italy) (Scotland) (Wales) Pro12 Final, May 27 at RDS Arena, Dublin:
  - (Wales) Ospreys defeat (Ireland) Leinster 31–30 to claim their fourth Celtic League/Pro12 title.
- (England) (Wales) LV Cup (Anglo-Welsh Cup) – Leicester Tigers
- (New Zealand) ITM Cup
  - Premiership Final, October 27 at Rugby League Park, Christchurch: Canterbury defeat Auckland 31–18 for their fifth consecutive provincial title.
  - Championship Final, October 26 at ECOLight Stadium, Pukekohe: Counties Manukau defeat Otago 41–16 to claim their first title at any level of provincial rugby in 32 years. The Steelers are promoted to the 2013 ITM Premiership, replacing bottom-placed Hawke's Bay.
- (South Africa) Currie Cup Final, October 27 at Mr Price Kings Park, Durban:
  - Western Province defeat Sharks 25–18 to claim their first Currie Cup title since 2001.

== Other news ==
- IRB Hall of Fame Class of 2012:
  - Gordon Tietjens, New Zealand (inducted 13 May at Twickenham, London shortly after the London Sevens)
  - Ian Campbell and Donald Campbell, Chile (inducted 26 May in Santiago on the final day of the South American Championship)
  - Yoshihiro "Demi" Sakata, Japan (inducted 5 June at halftime of the Japan–Fiji Pacific Nations Cup match at Mizuho Rugby Stadium, Nagoya)
  - 1924 Romania Olympic rugby team, Romania (inducted 6 June at Stadionul Arcul de Triumf, Bucharest)
  - 1920 and 1924 USA Olympic rugby teams, United States (inducted 30 June at halftime of the Junior World Rugby Trophy Final at Murray Rugby Park Stadium, Salt Lake City)
  - Richard Tsimba and Kennedy Tsimba, Zimbabwe (inducted 25 October in Johannesburg)

== See also ==
- 2012 in sports
