= Andrés Pizarro =

Chilean field hockey player

Personal information
- Full name: Andrés Felipe Pizarro Lemonci
- Born: 7 December 1999 (age 26) Santiago, Chile

Sport
- Sport: Field hockey
- Position: Defence
- Club: Prince of Wales Country Club
National team
Years	Team	Caps	Goals
2017–	Chile	26	(1)
2021	Chile U–21	5	(7)
Medal record
Men's field hockey
Representing Chile
Pan American Cup
Silver medal – second place	2022 Santiago
Pan American Junior Championship
Gold medal – first place	2021 Santiago

Andrés Felipe Pizarro Lemonci (born 7 December 1999) is a Chilean field hockey player.

== Career ==
=== Junior national team ===
In 2021 Pizarro made his debut for the Chilean U–21 team. He captained the team to a gold medal at the Pan American Junior Championship in Santiago, where he was also the top goalscorer.

=== Los Diablos ===
Andrés Pizarro made his debut for Los Diablos in 2017, at the Pan American Cup in Lancaster.

He has gone on to represent the team at many major tournaments since, most notably the 2019 Pan American Games in Lima.

==== International goals ====
Goal	Date	Location	Opponent	Score	Result	Competition	Ref.
1	28 January 2020	Prince of Wales Country Club, Santiago, Chile	Argentina	1–2	1–4	Test Match	
