= Sebastián Wolansky =

Chilean field hockey player

Personal information
- Full name: Sebastián Alejandro Wolansky Valck
- Born: 11 March 2003 (age 23) Villarrica, Chile

Sport
- Sport: Field hockey
- Position: Defence
Senior career
Years	Team	Caps	Goals
–	Club Manquehue	-	-
National team
Years	Team	Caps	Goals
2021–2024	Chile U–21	25	(10)
2021–	Chile	15	(2)
Medal record
Men's field hockey
Representing Chile
Pan American Games
Silver medal – second place	2023 Santiago	Team
Pan American Junior Championship
Gold medal – first place	2021 Santiago	Team
Bronze medal – third place	2023 St. Michael	Team
Bronze medal – third place	2024 Surrey	Team

Sebastián Alejandro Wolansky Valck is a Chilean field hockey player.

== Early life ==
Sebastián Wolansky was born on 11 March 2003, in Penco, Chile.

== Career ==
=== Under–21 ===
Wolansky made his international debut at under-21 level, making his first appearance in 2015. He was a member of the historic gold medal-winning Chilean team at the Pan American Junior Championship in Santiago. Later that year he went on to represent the team again at the FIH Junior World Cup in Bhubaneswar.

In 2023, Wolansky was promoted to captain of the national junior team. He led the Chilean U–21 side to a bronze medal at his second Pan American Junior Championship, held in St. Michael. He also later competed at a second FIH Junior World Cup in Kuala Lumpur.

He also captained the team at the 2024 Pan American Junior Championship in Surrey.

=== Los Diablos ===
Wolansky received his first call-up to the Chilean squad in 2021. He made his senior international debut during a test series against France in Wattignies.

After not receiving a call-up in 2022, Wolansky returned to the national team in 2023. That same year he won his first medal at a major tournament, taking home silver at the Pan American Games in Santiago.

==== International goals ====
Goal	Date	Location	Opponent	Score	Result	Competition	Ref.
1	30 July 2023	Prater Hockeystadion, Vienna, Austria	Austria	2–1	2–3	Test Match	
2	25 October 2023	Centro Deportivo de Hockey Césped, Santiago, Chile	Peru	13–0	15–0	2023 Pan American Games	
