= Field hockey at the 2022 South American Youth Games =

Field Hockey at the 2022 South American Youth Games was held from 5 to 8 May. The events took place at the Hipódromo de Rosario in Rosario, Argentina. The format for this event was Hockey 5s, a 5-a-side tournament that is played on a smaller field size.

== Medal summary ==
=== Medal table ===
The results were as follows:

* Host nation (Argentina)

| Rank | Nation | Gold | Silver | Bronze | Total |
|---|---|---|---|---|---|
| 1 | Argentina (ARG)* | 2 | 0 | 0 | 2 |
| 2 | Brazil (BRA) | 0 | 1 | 0 | 1 |
| 2 | Uruguay (URU) | 0 | 1 | 0 | 1 |
| 4 | Chile (CHI) | 0 | 0 | 2 | 2 |
| Totals (4 entries) | | 2 | 2 | 2 | 6 |

=== Medalists ===
| Event | Gold | Silver | Bronze |
|---|---|---|---|
| Boys | Argentina; Antonio Bralo; Simon Casiello; Cirilo Cippitelli; Juan Pedro Fernández; Facundo Guerra; Nicolás Rodríguez; Joaquín Ruiz; Tomás Ruiz; Thiago Zalazar | Brazil; João Pedro Baptista; Victor De Godoy; Frederico Filgueiras; Luigi Lunardi; Gustavo Padovan; Pedro Santana; Leonardo Santos; Jose Vitor Rodrigues; Lucas Varela | Chile; Tomás Aldunate; Felipe Duisberg; Sebastian Loehnert; Diego Obanos; Mateo Perret; Felipe Richard; León Taladriz; Javier Vargas; Vicente Wilhelmy |
| Girls | Argentina; Catalina Bustillo; Juana Castellaro; Ambar Caucigh; Lourdes Estigarria; Victoria Falasco; Carolina Lardies; Renata Leszczynski; Pilar Robles; Valentina Rebesberger | Uruguay; Justina Arregui; Guillermina Carassale; Carolina Curcio; Chiara Curcio; Jacinta Curutchague; Sol Martínez; Sol Myszka; María Eugenia Rodríguez; Manuela Servetto | Chile; Montserrat Araya; Florencia Barrios; Trinidad Barrios; Josefina Gutiérrez; Ignacia Mella; Laura Müller; Ignacia Orellana; Laura Salamanca; Nicole Tarp-Hansen |
