= Ian Campbell (rugby union) =

Chilean rugby union player (1928–2022)

- Born: 15 May 1928 Santiago, Chile
- Died: 11 November 2022 (aged 94)

Rugby union career
- Position(s): Fly-half, Centre
International career
Years	Team	Apps	(Points)
1948–1961	Chile		
- Father: Colin Campbell
- Relatives: Donald Campbell (brother)

Ian Campbell (15 May 1928 – 11 November 2022) was a Chilean rugby union footballer, of Scottish descent. He played as a fly-half and a centre. He is considered one of the best Chilean rugby players of all time, and was inducted into the IRB Hall of Fame in 2012.

== Early life ==
His father, Colin Campbell, was a Scottish-born emigrant, businessman, and amateur football player, who had played for Chile in the 1910 South American Championship.

== Career ==
Campbell followed in the rugby footsteps of his older brother Donald Campbell, a Chile international who had been killed in action in 1944 while serving with the Royal Air Force. The younger Campbell began playing rugby at the Saint Peter's School, in Valparaíso. He went to play for Prince of Wales Country Club, where he was also the captain.

Campbell was capped for the first time for Chile, on 5 September 1948 in a historical 21–3 win over Uruguay, in Buenos Aires. In fact, he never lost to the "Teros", when he played in the Chilean side, for the next 13 years. Campbell's best results were the runners-up title at the South American Championship three times, in 1951, 1958 and 1961. This last time, Chile lost narrowly to arch-rivals Argentina by 11–6, with Campbell missing five penalties. Campbell was then called "the most skilful player in South America".

Campbell left the National team the same year, but still played until the 1970s. After that, he became a coach.

Campbell's grandson, Santiago Fuenzalida, was a member of Chilean U-20 team for 2008 IRB Junior World Rugby Trophy. He was killed in a car accident.

In 2012, Campbell was inducted into the IRB Hall of Fame along with his brother Donald.
