= Felipe Duisberg =

Chilean field hockey player

Personal information
- Full name: Felipe Duisberg Krebs
- Born: 22 March 2006 (age 20) Chile

Sport
- Sport: Field hockey
- Position: Midfield
National team
Years	Team	Caps	Goals
2021–	Chile U–21	35	(8)
2025–	Chile	7	(0)
Medal record
Men's field hockey
Representing Chile
Junior Pan American Games
Bronze medal – third place	2025 Asunción	Team
Pan American Junior Championship
Bronze medal – third place	2023 St. Michael	Team
Bronze medal – third place	2024 Surrey	Team
Bronze medal – third place	2026 Santiago	Team

Felipe Duisberg Krebs (born 22 March 2006) is an international field hockey player from Chile.

== Education ==
He is a student at the Universidad de Chile.

== Field hockey ==
=== Under–21 ===
Duisberg made his international debut at just 15-years-old, at under–21 level. He was a member of the Chilean U–21 team at the FIH Junior World Cup in Bhubaneswar, where the team finished in fourteenth place.

Since his debut, he has been a constant inclusion in the junior national team. He has appeared at three editions of the Junior Pan American Cup, winning bronze at each. These medals came at the 2023 edition in Saint Michael, the 2024 edition in Surrey and the 2026 edition in Santiago.

He has also appeared at two more editions of the FIH Junior World Cup. The first was the 2023 tournament in Kuala Lumpur, followed by the 2025 tournament held in Tamil Nadu.

In 2025 he won a bronze medal at the II Junior Pan American Games in Asunción.

=== Senior national team ===
He received his first call-up into the senior national team in 2025, when he was named in the squad for the 2025 Pan American Cup in Montevideo. He earned his first senior cap during the tournament in Chile's opening match against Canada.

In 2026 he competed at the FIH World Cup Qualifiers in Santiago.
