= Chiara Curcio =

Australian field hockey player (born 2005)

Personal information
- Full name: Chiara Curcio Caballero
- Born: 28 February 2006 (age 20) Montevideo, Uruguay

Sport
- Sport: Field hockey
- Position: Midfield
Senior career
Years	Team	Caps	Goals
–	Club Náutico	-	-
National team
Years	Team	Caps	Goals
2024–	Uruguay U–21	12	(2)
2025–	Uruguay	5	(0)
Medal record
Women's field hockey
Representing Uruguay
Pan American Cup
Bronze medal – third place	2025 Montevideo	Team
Pan American Junior Championship
Bronze medal – third place	2026 Santiago	Team
South American Youth Games
Silver medal – second place	2022 Rosario	Team

Chiara Curcio Caballero (born 28 February 2006) is a field hockey and Hockey5s player from Uruguay.

== Field hockey ==
=== Under–21 ===
In 2024, she made her debut for the Uruguayan U–21 team. She represented the team at the Pan American Junior Championship in Surrey.

Following her debut in 2024, Curcio was named captain of the national junior squad in 2025. She led the team at the Junior Pan American Games in Asunción, finishing the tournament in fourth place. She has since been named in the squad for the FIH Junior World Cup in Santiago.

=== Las Cimmaronas ===
She made her senior international debut in 2025 at the Pan American Cup in Montevideo, where she won a bronze medal.

== Hockey5s ==
=== Under–18 ===
Curcio made her international debut at under–18 level in the Hockey5s format. She was a member of the national youth squad at the 2022 South American Youth Games in Rosario. At the tournament, she won a silver medal.

=== Senior national team ===
She won silver at the 2023 Pan American Hockey5s Championship in Kingston.
