= 2024 Men's Junior Pan American Championship =

Field hockey championship

Tournament details
- Host country: Canada
- City: Surrey
- Dates: 3–12 July
- Teams: 6 (from 1 confederation)
- Venue: Tamanawis Park

Final positions
- Champions: Argentina (13th title)
- Runner-up: Canada
- Third place: Chile

Tournament statistics
- Matches played: 20
- Goals scored: 108 (5.4 per match)
- Top scorer: (Argentina) Marco Aguirre Gómez Corta (13 goals)
- Best player: (Canada) Robin Thind
- Best goalkeeper: (United States) Amar Singh

The 2024 Men's Junior Pan American Championship was the 14th edition of the Men's Pan American Junior Championship, the biennial men's international under-21 field hockey championship of the Americas, organised by the Pan American Hockey Federation. It was held alongside the women's tournament from 3 to 12 July 2024 at Tamanawis Park in Surrey, British Columbia, Canada.

Argentina were the defending champions, they defended their title by defeating the hosts Canada 10–0 in the final. Chile won the bronze medal by defeating the United States 3–2 in a shoot-out after the match finished 1–1. The tournament served as a direct qualifier for the 2025 Junior World Cup, with the top three teams, Argentina, Canada and Chile, qualifying. It also served as a qualifier for the 2025 Junior Pan American Games for the top five teams.

== Teams ==
- Argentina
- Brazil
- Canada
- Chile
- Mexico
- United States

== Preliminary round ==
All times are local (All times are local (UTC-7)

=== Standings ===
Pos	Team	Pld	W	D	L	GF	GA	GD	Pts	Qualification
1	Argentina	5	5	0	0	44	0	+44	15	Semi-finals and 2025 Junior; Pan American Games
2	Canada (H)	5	3	1	1	19	7	+12	10	Semi-finals and 2025 Junior; Pan American Games
3	Chile	5	3	0	2	8	10	−2	9	Semi-finals and 2025 Junior; Pan American Games
4	United States	5	2	1	2	10	16	−6	7	Semi-finals and 2025 Junior; Pan American Games
5	Brazil	5	1	0	4	3	22	−19	3	
6	Mexico	5	0	0	5	2	31	−29	0	

Source: FIH
Rules for classification: 1) points; 2) matches won; 3) goal difference; 4) goals for; 5) head-to-head result; 6) field goals for.
(H) Hosts

=== Matches ===
3 July 2024
12:00

Argentina	9–0	Mexico
Somaini 6', 15'; Aguirre Gómez Corta 20', 32'; Serrano 36', 49'; Martínez 41'; Nardolillo 45'; S. Fernández 58'	Report

Umpires:
Guillermo Poblete (CHI)
Brian Tyson (USA)

3 July 2024
16:00

Chile	2–1	United States
Aguirre 47'; Duisberg 59'	Report	Grewal 48'

Umpires:
Juan Rodríguez (ARG)
Pambavasan Manikandan (CAN)

3 July 2024
20:00

Canada	6–0	Brazil
Thind 25', 34', 55'; Nicholson 36', 58'; Robinson 43'	Report

Umpires:
Jonathan Altamirano (MEX)
Ana Vázquez Escalante (MEX)

4 July 2024
12:00

Mexico	1–5	Chile
Silva 53'	Report	Wolansky 42', 45', 45'; Hasson 56'; Stein 58'

Umpires:
Juan Rodríguez (ARG)
Nora Struchtrup (CAN)

4 July 2024
16:00

Argentina	12–0	Brazil
Rodríguez 2', 29', 60'; Correa 3'; Somaini 7', 26'; Aguirre Gómez Corta 10', 20', 23'; Cippitelli 34'; Martínez 43'; Rey 50'	Report

Umpires:
Pambavasan Manikandan (CAN)
Jonathan Altamirano (MEX)

4 July 2024
20:00

Canada	0–0	United States
	Report

Umpires:
Fabián Romero (PAR)
Guillermo Poblete (CHI)

6 July 2024
12:00

Chile	0–5	Argentina
	Report	Aguirre Gómez Corta 12', 28'; Serrano 40'; Rey 42'; Somaini 60'

Umpires:
Brian Tyson (USA)
Pambavasan Manikandan (CAN)

6 July 2024
16:00

United States	3–2	Brazil
Charasika 2', 25'; Grewal 60'	Report	Sauerbronn 10'; Varela 49'

Umpires:
Juan Rodríguez (ARG)
Fabian Romero (PAR)

6 July 2024
20:00

Mexico	1–10	Canada
Benedith 42'	Report	Thind 10', 11', 40', 48'; Dhadda 26'; Gill 30'; Miranda 32', 36'; Chandi 55'; Simpson 57'

Umpires:
Pedro Fortes (BRA)
Guillermo Poblete (CHI)

7 July 2024
12:00

Brazil	0–1	Chile
	Report	Richard 51'

Umpires:
Brian Tyson (USA)
Juan Rodríguez (ARG)

7 July 2024
16:00

United States	6–0	Mexico
Charasika 25', 30', 32', 44'; Grewal 33', 46'	Report

Umpires:
Pedro Fortes (BRA)
Pambavasan Manikandan (CAN)

7 July 2024
20:00

Canada	0–6	Argentina
	Report	Somaini 2'; Correa 8'; Andreotti 14'; Martínez 17', 56'; Zalazar 45+'

Umpires:
Jonathan Altamirano (MEX)
Fabián Romero (PAR)

9 July 2024
12:00

Brazil	1–0	Mexico
Lunardi 3'	Report

Umpires:
Guillermo Poblete (CHI)
Pambavasan Manikandan (CAN)

9 July 2024
16:00

Argentina	12–0	United States
J. Fernández 11', 12', 35'; Aguirre Gómez Corta 13', 20', 37', 52'; Cippitelli 19'; Zalazar 50'; Serrano 57'; T. Ruiz 60'; Rodríguez 60'	Report

Umpires:
Fabian Romero (PAR)
Jonathan Altamirano (MEX)

9 July 2024
20:00

Chile	0–3	Canada
	Report	Thind 3', 31'; Robinson 39'

Umpires:
Juan Rodriguez (ARG)
Brian Tyson (USA)

== Classification round ==
=== Fifth and sixth place ===
10 July 2024
11:15

Brazil	1–1	Mexico
Lunardi 9'	Report	Benedith 13'
Penalties
Godoy (penalty shoot-out missed); Batista (penalty shoot-out missed); Giro (penalty shoot-out missed)	0–3	(penalty shoot-out scored) Benedith; (penalty shoot-out scored) González; (penalty shoot-out scored) Camacho

Umpires:
Pambavasan Manikandan (CAN)
Fabian Romero (PAR)

== First to fourth place classification ==
=== Bracket ===
Semi-finals
10 July
Argentina	3
United States	0
10 July
Canada	3
Chile	2

Final
12 July
Argentina	10
Canada	0
Third place
12 July
United States	1 (2)
Chile (p.s.o.)	1 (3)

=== Semi-finals ===
10 July 2024
13:30

Argentina	3–0	United States
T. Ruiz 16'; Somaini 22'; Fernández 60'	Report

Umpires:
Jonathan Altamirano (MEX)
Guillermo Poblete (CHI)

10 July 2024
20:15

Canada	3–2	Chile
Thind 18', 32'; Loh 59'	Report	Wolansky 23'; Richard 59'

Umpires:
Juan Rodriguez (ARG)
Brian Tyson (USA)

=== Third and fourth place ===
12 July 2024
14:45

United States	1–1	Chile
Charasika 18'	Report	Duisberg 35'
Penalties
Charasika (penalty shoot-out missed); Bleeker (penalty shoot-out scored); Katz (penalty shoot-out missed); Grewal (penalty shoot-out missed); Nobereit (penalty shoot-out scored); Charasika (penalty shoot-out missed)	2–3	(penalty shoot-out scored) Taladriz; (penalty shoot-out missed) De Witt; (penalty shoot-out missed) Richard; (penalty shoot-out scored) Hasson; (penalty shoot-out missed) Wolansky; (penalty shoot-out scored) Taladriz

Umpires:
Juan Rodriguez (ARG)
Fabian Romero (PAR)

=== Final ===
12 July 2024
19:15

Argentina	10–0	Canada
T. Ruiz 7', 13'; S. Fernández 8'; Rodríguez 19', 25'; Aguirre Gómez Corta 20', 58'; J. Fernández 30'; Serrano 47'; Zalazar 51'	Report

Umpires:
Brian Tyson (USA)
Guillermo Poblete (CHI)

== Statistics ==
=== Final standings ===
Pos	Team	Qualification
1st place, gold medalist(s)	Argentina	2025 Junior World Cup and 2025 Junior Pan American Games
2nd place, silver medalist(s)	Canada (H)	2025 Junior World Cup and 2025 Junior Pan American Games
3rd place, bronze medalist(s)	Chile	2025 Junior World Cup and 2025 Junior Pan American Games
4	United States	2025 Junior Pan American Games
5	Mexico	2025 Junior Pan American Games
6	Brazil	

Source: FIH
(H) Host

=== Goalscorers ===
There were 108 goals scored in 20 matches, for an average of 5.4 goals per match.

13 goals

- (Argentina) Marco Aguirre Gómez Corta

11 goals

- (Canada) Robin Thind

7 goals

- (Argentina) Lorenzo Somaini
- (United States) Sekayi Charasika

6 goals

- (Argentina) Nicolás Rodríguez

5 goals

- (Argentina) Mateo Serrano

4 goals

- (Argentina) Juan Fernández
- (Argentina) Lautaro Martínez
- (Argentina) Tomás Ruiz
- (Chile) Sebastián Wolansky
- (United States) Mehtab Grewal

3 goals

- (Argentina) Santiago Fernández
- (Argentina) Thiago Zalazar

2 goals

- (Argentina) Cirilo Cippitelli
- (Argentina) Bruno Correa
- (Argentina) Matías Rey
- (Brazil) Luigi Lunardi
- (Canada) Joshua Miranda
- (Canada) Jude Nicholson
- (Canada) Kirin Robinson
- (Chile) Felipe Duisberg
- (Chile) Felipé Richard
- (Mexico) Andre Benedith

1 goal

- (Argentina) Matías Andreotti
- (Argentina) Ignacio Nardolillo
- (Brazil) Frederico Sauerbronn
- (Brazil) Lucas Varela
- (Canada) Navdip Chandi
- (Canada) Satpreet Dhadda
- (Canada) Ravpreet Gill
- (Canada) Hudson Loh
- (Canada) Grant Simpson
- (Chile) Fernando Aguirre
- (Chile) Tomás Hasson
- (Chile) Axel Stein
- (Mexico) Rodrigo Silva

Source: FIH
