= Iñaki Minadeo =

Argentine field hockey player

Personal information
- Born: 9 June 2003 (age 23) Argentina

Sport
- Sport: Field hockey
- Position: Defence
Senior career
Years	Team	Caps	Goals
–	Banco Provincia	-	-
National team
Years	Team	Caps	Goals
2023–	Argentina U–21	10	(8)
2024–	Argentina	8	(0)
Medal record
Men's field hockey
Representing Argentina
Pan American Junior Championship
Gold medal – first place	2023 St. Michael

Iñaki Minadeo (born 9 June 2003) is an Argentine field hockey player.

In 2024 he will represent Argentina at the XXXIII Summer Olympics in France.

== Career ==
=== Under–21 ===
Iñaki Minadeo made his international debut at under-21 level, making his first appearance in 2023. He debuted for the Argentine U–21 team at the Pan American Junior Championship in St. Michael. At the tournament, he captained the team to a gold medal, also finishing as highest goalscorer. He also captained the team again later in the year at the FIH Junior World Cup in Kuala Lumpur.

=== Los Leones ===
In 2024, Minadeo was selected in the Los Leones squad for the first time. He made his senior international debut during the home leg of season five of the FIH Pro League in Santiago del Estero. On 7 June 2024, he was named in the national squad for the XXXIII Summer Olympics in Paris.
