= Hudson Loh =

Canadian field hockey player

Personal information
- Full name: Hudson Loh
- Born: July 24, 2003 (age 23) Vancouver, Canada

Sport
- Sport: Field hockey
- Position: Forward
- Club: Vancouver Hawks
National team
Years	Team	Caps	Goals
2023–2024	Canada U–21	18	(5)
2024–	Canada	14	(2)
Medal record
Men's field hockey
Representing Canada
Pan American Junior Championship
Silver medal – second place	2023 St. Michael	Team
Silver medal – second place	2024 Surrey	Team

Hudson Loh (born July 24, 2003) is a Canadian field hockey player who plays as a forward for the Canadian national team.

== Field hockey ==
=== Club career ===
Loh grew up playing in Hong Kong before playing club hockey for the Vancouver Hawks in Canada.

=== Under–21 ===
Loh made his international debut at the under–21 level as a member of the Canada U–21 squad at the 2023 Men's Junior Pan American Championship in Bridgetown, Barbados. Later in the year he represented the team again at the FIH Junior World Cup in Kuala Lumpur.

In 2024 Loh was named to the Canada U–21 squad at the 2024 Men's Junior Pan American Championship in Surrey, British Columbia.

=== Senior team ===
In 2024, Loh received his first cap with the Canada men's national field hockey team at the 2023–24 FIH Nations Cup in Gniezno. He scored his first international goal against Austria and was named player of the match. He helped the team to a fifth-place finish, jumping three slots from their last Nations Cup appearance.

== Personal ==
Loh attended St. George's School (Vancouver) in Canada. He now attends Colgate University in Hamilton, New York.

Loh, previously played ice hockey. He competed twice at the Quebec International Pee-Wee Hockey Tournament and played academy hockey in the Canadian Sport School Hockey League. He then moved onto playing Junior ice hockey for the Burnaby Steelers in the Pacific Junior Hockey League.
