= Field hockey at the 2025 Junior Pan American Games – Men's tournament =

Men's field hockey at the 2025 Junior Pan American Games
Tournament details
- Host country: Paraguay
- City: Luque
- Dates: 10–18 August
- Teams: 8 (from 1 confederation)
- Venue: Olympic Park

Final positions
- Champions: Argentina (1st title)
- Runner-up: Canada
- Third place: Chile

Tournament statistics
- Matches played: 20
- Goals scored: 121 (6.05 per match)
- Top scorer: (Argentina) Bruno Correa (12 goals)

The men's field hockey tournament at the 2025 Junior Pan American Games was the first edition of the men's field hockey event at the Junior Pan American Games. It was held from 10 to 18 August 2025 alongside the women's tournament at the National Hockey Center, located in the Olympic Park in Luque, Paraguay.

Argentina won the first edition as they beat Canada 4–2 in the final. Chile won the bronze medal as they defeated the United States 4–2. As winners Argentina qualified with their senior team for the 2027 Pan American Games.

== Qualification ==
Qualification	Date	Host/Country	Berths	Qualified team
Host country	—N/a		1	Paraguay
2024 Junior Pan American Championship	3–12 July 2024	Surrey	5	Argentina; Canada; Chile; Mexico; United States
2025 Junior Pan American Challenge	8–16 March 2025	Bridgetown	2	Brazil; Trinidad and Tobago
Total			8	

== Preliminary round ==
All times are local (UTC−3).

=== Pool A ===
Pos	Team	Pld	W	D	L	GF	GA	GD	Pts	Qualification
1	Argentina	3	3	0	0	39	0	+39	9	Semi-finals
2	United States	3	2	0	1	9	11	−2	6	Semi-finals
3	Brazil	3	0	1	2	3	15	−12	1	
4	Paraguay (H)	3	0	1	2	2	27	−25	1	

Source: FIH
Rules for classification: 1) points; 2) matches won; 3) goal difference; 4) goals for; 5) head-to-head result; 6) field goals for.
(H) Hosts

10 August 2025
17:30

Argentina	11–0	Brazil
Serrano 2'; Boretti 9'; Martínez 11'; S. Fernández 37', 53'; Costa 44'; Torrigiani 45'; Correa 49', 50'; Rodríguez 52'; J. Fernández 56'	Report

Umpires:
Fabian Romero (PAR)
Claudio Martinez (URU)

10 August 2025
19:30

United States	6–1	Paraguay
Nobereit 24', 60'; Schoenfelder 25'; Bleeker 32'; Beauduin 41'; Grewal 49'	Report	Velazquez 29'

Umpires:
Andrey Umana (CRC)
Adrian Cross (JAM)

12 August 2025
17:30

United States	0–8	Argentina
	Report	Rodríguez 12', 23'; Torrigiani 26'; Boretti 30+'; S. Fernández 34'; Correa 38', 56'; T. Ruiz 60'

Umpires:
Fabian Romero (PAR)
Andrey Umana (CRC)

12 August 2025
19:30

Brazil	1–1	Paraguay
Lunardi 1'	Report	González 58'

Umpires:
Claudio Martinez (URU)
Pambavasan Manikandan (CAN)

14 August 2025
17:30

Brazil	2–3	United States
Moreira 15' da Silva 27'	Report	Bertelsmeier 2'; Grewal 7', 32'

Umpires:
Claudio Martinez (URU)
Ricardo Albertz (CHI)

14 August 2025
19:30

Argentina	20–0	Paraguay
Rodríguez 6', 11'; S. Fernández 15', 33', 37', 54', 56'; Torrigiani 19', 29', 49', 57'; Correa 23', 29', 30', 48', 50'; Barberis 26'; Costa 38'; Serrano 40'; T. Ruiz 44'	Report

Umpires:
Erika Barbera (USA)
Nora Struchtrup (CAN)

=== Pool B ===
Pos	Team	Pld	W	D	L	GF	GA	GD	Pts	Qualification
1	Canada	3	2	0	1	11	5	+6	6	Semi-finals
2	Chile	3	2	0	1	7	3	+4	6	Semi-finals
3	Mexico	3	1	0	2	5	8	−3	3	
4	Trinidad and Tobago	3	1	0	2	4	11	−7	3	

Source: FIH
Rules for classification: 1) points; 2) matches won; 3) goal difference; 4) goals for; 5) head-to-head result; 6) field goals for.

10 August 2025
09:30

Canada	3–4	Mexico
De Souza 19'; Simonson 20'; Campbell 47'	Report	Francis 3'; Cuate 21'; Rodríguez 50'; Santillan 54'

Umpires:
Basilio Canale (ARG)
Kevin George (TTO)

10 August 2025
11:30

Chile	4–1	Trinidad and Tobago
Hasson 9', 36'; Fosalba 48'; Vargas 56'	Report	Siu Butt 45'

Umpires:
Pambavasan Manikandan (CAN)
Brian Tyson (USA)

12 August 2025
09:30

Mexico	1–2	Trinidad and Tobago
Cuate 30'	Report	Wyatt 35'; Rowe 48'

Umpires:
Basilio Canale (ARG)
Ricardo Albertz (CHI)

12 August 2025
11:30

Chile	0–2	Canada
	Report	Robinson 19'; Simonson 39'

Umpires:
Kevin George (TTO)
Brian Tyson (USA)

14 August 2025
09:30

Canada	6–1	Trinidad and Tobago
Robinson 8', 19'; Ross 13'; Dhadda 20'; Chandi 43'; De Souza 58'	Report	Adamson 40'

Umpires:
Fabian Romero (PAR)
Adrian Cross (JAM)

14 August 2025
11:30

Mexico	0–3	Chile
	Report	Duisberg 16'; Vargas 56'; Loehnert 59'

Umpires:
Pambavasan Manikandan (CAN)
Kevin George (TTO)

== Fifth to eighth place classification ==
=== Bracket ===
Cross-overs
16 August
Brazil	5
Trinidad and Tobago	4
16 August
Paraguay	0
Mexico	5

Fifth place
18 August
Brazil	0
Mexico	4
Seventh place
18 August
Trinidad and Tobago	4
Paraguay	1

=== Cross-overs ===
16 August 2025
09:30

Brazil	5–4	Trinidad and Tobago
Moreira 4', 35'; Xavier 7' da Silva 30'; Buzatto 36'	Report	Siu Butt 36'; Edwards 37'; Nieves 46', 51'

Umpires:
Ricardo Albertz (CHI)
Adrian Cross (JAM)

16 August 2025
11:45

Paraguay	0–5	Mexico
	Report	Santillan 19', 36'; Rodríguez 21'; González 49'; Cuate 56'

Umpires:
Claudio Martinez (URU)
Andrey Umana (CRC)

=== Seventh and eighth place ===
18 August 2025
09:30

Trinidad and Tobago	4–1	Paraguay
Whiteman 5'; Wyatt 14', 50'; Edwards 55'	Report	Villagra 53'

Umpires:
Claudio Martinez (URU)
Pambavasan Manikandan (CAN)

=== Fifth and sixth place ===
18 August 2025
11:45

Brazil	0–4	Mexico
	Report	Estrada 40'; Santillan 42'; Cuate 57'; Francis 60'

Umpires:
Brian Tyson (USA)
Fabian Romero (PAR)

== Medal round ==
=== Bracket ===
Semi-finals
16 August
Argentina	5
Chile	0
16 August
United States	0
Canada	1

Final
18 August
Argentina	4
Canada	2
Third place
18 August
Chile	4
United States	2

=== Semi-finals ===
16 August 2025
17:30

Argentina	5–0	Chile
Correa 1', 60'; J. Fernández 23'; Rodríguez 25'; Boretti 41'	Report

Umpires:
Brian Tyson (USA)
Pambavasan Manikandan (CAN)

16 August 2025
19:45

United States	0–1	Canada
	Report	Dhadda 57'

Umpires:
Alberto Chamorro (PAR)
Fabian Romero (PAR)

=== Bronze medal match ===
18 August 2025
17:30

Chile	4–2	United States
Hasson 8'; Wilhelmy 16'; Vargas 55'; Duisberg 59'	Report	Grewal 33'; Webb 59'

Umpires:
Basilio Canale (ARG)
Adrian Cross (JAM)

=== Gold medal match ===
18 August 2025
19:45

Argentina	4–2	Canada
Torrigiani 14'; T. Ruiz 27'; Rodríguez 36'; Correa 45'	Report	De Souza 53', 60'

Umpires:
Kevin George (TTO)
Ricardo Albertz (CHI)

== Statistics ==
=== Final standings ===
Pos	Team	Qualification
1st place, gold medalist(s)	Argentina	2027 Pan American Games
2nd place, silver medalist(s)	Canada	
3rd place, bronze medalist(s)	Chile	
4	United States	
5	Mexico	
6	Brazil	
7	Trinidad and Tobago	
8	Paraguay (H)	

Source: FIH
(H) Host

=== Goalscorers ===
There were 121 goals scored in 20 matches, for an average of 6.05 goals per match.

12 goals

- (Argentina) Bruno Correa

8 goals

- (Argentina) Santiago Fernández

7 goals

- (Argentina) Nicolás Rodríguez
- (Argentina) Mateo Torrigiani

4 goals

- (Canada) Leighton De Souza
- (Mexico) Jesahel Cuate
- (Mexico) Isidro Santillan
- (United States) Mehtab Grewal

3 goals

- (Argentina) Juan Boretti
- (Argentina) Tomás Ruiz
- (Brazil) Gabriel Luiz Moreira
- (Canada) Kirin Robinson
- (Chile) Tomás Hasson
- (Chile) Javier Vargas
- (Trinidad and Tobago) Adam Wyatt

2 goals

- (Argentina) Joaquín Costa
- (Argentina) Juan Fernández
- (Argentina) Mateo Serrano
- (Brazil) Henrique da Silva
- (Canada) Satpreet Dhadda
- (Canada) Kale Simonson
- (Chile) Felipé Duisberg
- (Mexico) Erick Francis
- (Mexico) Brandon Rodríguez
- (Trinidad and Tobago) Wayne Edwards
- (Trinidad and Tobago) Alexander Nieves
- (Trinidad and Tobago) Nicholas Siu Butt
- (United States) Bennet Nobereit

1 goal

- (Argentina) Joaquin Barberis
- (Argentina) Lautaro Martínez
- (Brazil) Francisco Buzatto
- (Brazil) Luigi Lunardi
- (Brazil) Murilo Xavier
- (Canada) Josiah Campbell
- (Canada) Navdip Chandi
- (Canada) Sawyer Ross
- (Chile) Gaspar Fosalba
- (Chile) Sebastian Loehnert
- (Chile) Vicente Wilhelmy
- (Mexico) Tonatihu Estrada
- (Mexico) Yael González
- (Paraguay) Tobías González
- (Paraguay) Jesus Velazquez
- (Paraguay) David Villagra
- (Trinidad and Tobago) Camron Adamson
- (Trinidad and Tobago) Alexander Rowe
- (Trinidad and Tobago) Nicholas Whiteman
- (United States) Alexandre Beauduin
- (United States) Matti Bertelsmeier
- (United States) Rory Bleeker
- (United States) Max Schoenfelder
- (United States) Charles Webb

Source: FIH
