= Robin Thind =

Canadian field hockey player

Personal information
- Full name: Robin Singh Thind
- Born: 8 May 2006 (age 20) Surrey, BC, Canada

Sport
- Sport: Field hockey
- Position: Forward
- Club: Surinder Lions
National team
Years	Team	Caps	Goals
2023–	Canada U–21	31	(34)
2025–	Canada	12	(6)
Medal record
Men's field hockey
Representing Canada
Pan American Cup
Bronze medal – third place	2025 Montevideo
Junior Pan American Cup
Silver medal – second place	2023 St. Michael
Silver medal – second place	2024 Surrey
Silver medal – second place	2026 Santiago

Robin Singh Thind (born 8 May 2006) is an international field hockey player from Canada.

== Personal life ==
Thind grew up in Surrey, BC, Canada.

== Career ==
=== Domestic ===
In his home province of British Columbia, Thind plays in the local league for the Surinder Lions FHC.

=== Under-21 ===
Thind made his international debut at under–21 level. His first appearances for the Canada U–21 team in 2023 at the Junior Pan American Cup in St. Michael, where he won a silver medal. He represented the team again later that year at the FIH Junior World Cup in Kuala Lumpur.

In 2024 he won his second silver at his second Junior Pan American Cup, held in his home town of Surrey. At the conclusion of the competition, he was named Player of the Tournament.

He appeared at his second FIH Junior World Cup in 2025, held in Madurai and Chennai. Where he scored 6 goals in 6 appearances

=== Senior national team ===
He made his senior international debut in 2025. He earned his first senior international cap in the opening match of the Pan American Cup in Montevideo. In his debut match Thind scored 3 goals. The team finished in third place, claiming the bronze medal with a 2–1 win over Chile.

In 2025 he represented the team at the 2026 FIH World Cup Qualifiers in Santiago.
