= 2021 Men's Junior Pan American Championship =

12th edition of the Men's Pan American Junior Championship hockey competition

Tournament details
- Host country: Chile
- City: Santiago
- Dates: 21–28 August
- Teams: 7 (from 1 confederation)
- Venue: Prince of Wales Country Club

Final positions
- Champions: Chile (1st title)
- Runner-up: Argentina
- Third place: United States

Tournament statistics
- Matches played: 15
- Goals scored: 69 (4.6 per match)
- Top scorer: (Chile) Andrés Pizarro (7 goals)
- Best player: (Trinidad and Tobago) Teague Marcano

The 2021 Men's Junior Pan American Championship was the 12th edition of the Men's Pan American Junior Championship, the men's international under-21 field hockey championship of the Americas organized by the Pan American Hockey Federation.

The tournament was held alongside the women's tournament at the Prince of Wales Country Club in Santiago, Chile and was originally scheduled to take place from 30 November to 13 December 2020. On 29 May 2020 the Pan American Hockey Federation announced that the tournament was rescheduled and would take place from 12 to 25 April 2021. Later on 15 January, it was announced that the competition would take place from 21 to 28 August 2021.

Argentina were the defending champions, winning the 2016 edition. This tournament served as the Pan American qualifier for the 2021 FIH Junior World Cup, with the finalists qualifying.

== Preliminary round ==
=== Pool A ===
Pos	Team	Pld	W	D	L	GF	GA	GD	Pts	Qualification
1	Argentina	2	2	0	0	11	1	+10	6	Semi-finals
2	United States	2	1	0	1	3	4	−1	3	Semi-finals
3	Trinidad and Tobago	2	0	0	2	3	12	−9	0	

Source: FIH
Rules for classification: 1) points; 2) matches won; 3) goal difference; 4) goals for; 5) head-to-head result; 6) field goals for.

23 August 2021
14:00

United States	0–2	Argentina
	Report	Fernández 4'; Stellato 48'

Umpires:
Tyler Klenk (CAN)
Yamil Dominguez (MEX)

24 August 2021
14:00

Trinidad and Tobago	2–3	United States
T. Marcano 12'; Daniel 30'	Report	Sharma 21'; Grewal 30'; Eisner 55'

Umpires:
Oliver Hock (BRA)
Guillermo Poblete (CHI)

25 August 2021
15:00

Argentina	9–1	Trinidad and Tobago
Ibarra 13'; Gomez 21', 55'; Stellato 24'; Garcia 25', 35', 49'; Toscani 32', 56'	Report	T. Marcano 35'

Umpires:
Ridge Bair (USA)
Shane Lewis (BAR)

=== Pool B ===
Pos	Team	Pld	W	D	L	GF	GA	GD	Pts	Qualification
1	Chile (H)	3	3	0	0	10	2	+8	9	Semi-finals
2	Canada	3	2	0	1	7	4	+3	6	Semi-finals
3	Mexico	3	1	0	2	8	9	−1	3	
4	Brazil	3	0	0	3	1	11	−10	0	

Source: FIH
Rules for classification: 1) points; 2) matches won; 3) goal difference; 4) goals for; 5) head-to-head result; 6) field goals for.
(H) Hosts

21 August 2021
14:00

Canada	3–1	Mexico
Davis 9'; Jacoby 44', 53'	Report	Méndez 42'

Umpires:
Oliver Hock (BRA)
Shane Lewis (BAR)

21 August 2021
16:00

Chile	2–0	Brazil
Koster 14'; Pizarro 17'	Report

Umpires:
Tyler Klenk (CAN)
Richard Harris (JAM)

22 August 2021
14:00

Mexico	6–1	Brazil
Sandoval 7', 37', 60'; Benedith 29'; Méndez 49'; Hernández 55'	Report	Oliveira 13'

Umpires:
Guillermo Poblete (CHI)
Ricardo Albertz (CHI)

22 August 2021
16:00

Chile	3–1	Canada
Pizarro 7'; Strabucchi 45+'; Hurtado 60'	Report	Singh 39'

Umpires:
Ridge Bair (USA)
Joaquín Morini del Castillo (ARG)

24 August 2021
10:00

Canada	3–0	Brazil
Davis 7'; Singh 40', 58'	Report

Umpires:
Yamil Dominguez (MEX)
Ricardo Albertz (CHI)

24 August 2021
16:00

Mexico	1–5	Chile
Méndez 28'	Report	Pizarro 5', 36'; Koster 16'; J. Echenique 23'; Valdivia 37'

Umpires:
Joaquín Morini del Castillo (ARG)
Richard Harris (JAM)

== Fifth to seventh place classification ==
=== Bracket ===
Seventh place
27 August
Trinidad and Tobago	4
Brazil	2

Fifth place
28 August
Trinidad and Tobago	4
Mexico	5

=== Seventh place match ===
27 August 2021
10:00

Trinidad and Tobago	4–2	Brazil
T. Marcano 1'; A. Marcano 3', 20'; Elcock 56'	Report	Rigueira 30', 32'

Umpires:
Ricardo Albertz (CHI)
Yamil Dominguez (MEX)

=== Fifth place match ===
28 August 2021
08:00

Trinidad and Tobago	4–5	Mexico
T. Marcano 5', 51', 52'; Daniel 17'	Report	Hernández 28'; Benedith 36'; Rangel 39'; Sandoval 44', 58'

Umpires:
Guilermo Poblete (CHI)
Oliver Hock (BRA)

== First to fourth place classification ==
=== Bracket ===
Semi-finals
27 August
Argentina	2
Canada	1
27 August
Chile	4
United States	0

Final
28 August
Argentina	1 (2)
Chile (s.o.)	1 (3)
Third place
28 August
Canada	1 (3)
United States (s.o.)	1 (4)

=== Semi-finals ===
27 August 2021
14:00

Argentina	2–1	Canada
Stellato 5', 55'	Report	Foong 58'

Umpires:
Ridge Bair (USA)
Shane Lewis (BAR)

27 August 2021
16:00

Chile	4–0	United States
Pizarro 9', 45'; R. Valenzuela 51'; Cerda 58'	Report

Umpires:
Joaquín Morini del Castillo (ARG)
Tyler Klenk (CAN)

=== Third place match ===
28 August 2021
14:00

Canada	1–1	United States
Singh 9'	Report	Sharma 36'
Penalties
Jacoby (penalty shoot-out scored); Bishop (penalty shoot-out scored); Buttar (penalty shoot-out missed); Dhillon (penalty shoot-out missed); Childs (penalty shoot-out scored)	3–4	(penalty shoot-out scored) Kloen; (penalty shoot-out scored) DeAngelis; (penalty shoot-out scored) Cutone; (penalty shoot-out missed) Khokhar; (penalty shoot-out scored) Sharma

Umpires:
Joaquin Morini del CAstillo (ARG)
Shane Lewis (BAR)

=== Final ===
28 August 2021
16:00

Argentina	1–1	Chile
Viviant 58'	Report	Pizarro 45+'
Penalties
Gomez (penalty shoot-out missed); Ibarra (penalty shoot-out scored); Tarquini (penalty shoot-out missed); Toscani (penalty shoot-out scored); Martin (penalty shoot-out missed)	2–3	(penalty shoot-out missed) R. Valenzuela; (penalty shoot-out scored) Cerda; (penalty shoot-out scored) Koster; (penalty shoot-out scored) Gesswein; (penalty shoot-out missed) Strabucchi

Umpires:
Tyler Klenk (CAN)
Richard Harris (JAM)

== Statistics ==
=== Final standings ===
Pos	Team	Qualification
1st place, gold medalist(s)	Chile (H)	2021 Junior World Cup
2nd place, silver medalist(s)	Argentina	2021 Junior World Cup
3rd place, bronze medalist(s)	United States	
4	Canada	
5	Mexico	
6	Trinidad and Tobago	
7	Brazil	

Source: FIH
(H) Host

=== Awards ===
The following awards were given at the conclusion of the tournament.

Player of the tournament	Goalkeeper of the tournament	Top goalscorer
(Trinidad and Tobago) Teague Marcano	(Chile) Agustin Araya	(Chile) Andrés Pizarro

=== Goalscorers ===
There were 69 goals scored in 15 matches, for an average of 4.6 goals per match.

7 goals

- (Chile) Andrés Pizarro

6 goals

- (Trinidad and Tobago) Teague Marcano

5 goals

- (Mexico) Alexander Sandoval

4 goals

- (Argentina) Bruno Stellato
- (Canada) Jagpreet Singh

3 goals

- (Argentina) Nazareno Garcia
- (Mexico) Yamil Méndez

2 goals

- (Argentina) Nahuel Gomez
- (Argentina) Joaquín Toscani
- (Brazil) Paulo Rigueira
- (Canada) Sean Davis
- (Canada) John Jacoby
- (Chile) Benjamín Koster
- (Mexico) Andre Benedith
- (Mexico) Erick Hernández
- (Trinidad and Tobago) Joel Daniel
- (Trinidad and Tobago) Aidan Marcano
- (United States) Jatin Sharma

1 goal

- (Argentina) Martín Fernandez
- (Argentina) Gregorio Ibarra
- (Argentina) Tobías Viviant
- (Brazil) Matheus Oliveira
- (Canada) Aaron Foong
- (Chile) Francisco Cerda
- (Chile) Jose Echenique
- (Chile) José Hurtado
- (Chile) Nils Strabucchi
- (Chile) Francisco Valdivia
- (Chile) Raimundo Valenzuela
- (Mexico) Brian Rangel
- (Trinidad and Tobago) Ghardel Elcock
- (United States) Brett Eisner
- (United States) Mehtab Grewal

Source: FIH

== See also ==
- 2021 Women's Junior Pan American Championship
