= Raimundo Valenzuela (field hockey) =

Chilean field hockey player

Personal information
- Full name: Raimundo Tomás Valenzuela
- Born: 10 May 2002 (age 24) Santiago, Chile

Sport
- Sport: Field hockey
- Position: Midfield
National team
Years	Team	Caps	Goals
2021–2023	Chile U–21	21	(2)
2021–	Chile	46	(9)
Medal record
Men's field hockey
Representing Chile
Pan American Games
Silver medal – second place	2023 Santiago	Team
Pan American Cup
Silver medal – second place	2022 Santiago	Team
South American Games
Silver medal – second place	2022 Asunción	Team
Pan American Junior Championship
Gold medal – first place	2021 Santiago	Team
Bronze medal – third place	2023 St. Michael	Team

Raimundo Tomás Valenzuela (born 10 May 2002) is a Chilean field hockey player.

== Early life ==
Raimundo Valenzuela was born and raised in Santiago, Chile.

== Career ==
=== Under–21 ===
Valenzuela made his international debut at under-21 level, making his first appearance in 2021. He was a member of the historic gold medal-winning Chilean team at the Pan American Junior Championship in Santiago. Later that year he went on to represent the team again at the FIH Junior World Cup in Bhubaneswar.

In 2023, Valenzuela won his second medal with the Chilean U–21 side, taking home a bronze medal at his second Pan American Junior Championship, held in St. Michael. He also later competed at a second FIH Junior World Cup in Kuala Lumpur.

=== Los Diablos ===
He received his first call-up to the Chilean senior squad in 2021. He made his senior international debut during a test series against France in Wattignies.

Throughout 2022 and 2023, Valenzuela had a series of call-ups during major international tournaments. He won silver medals on three occasions, at the 2022 Pan American Cup in Santiago, the XII South American Games in Asunción, and finally the XIX Pan American Games, also in Santiago. He also represented the side at the 2023 FIH World Cup, held in Bhubaneswar and Rourkela.
