= Tomás Ruiz (field hockey) =

Argentine field hockey player

Personal information
- Full name: Tomás Ruiz Saporti
- Born: 6 May 2004 (age 22) Argentina

Sport
- Sport: Field hockey
- Position: Midfield
National team
Years	Team	Caps	Goals
2023–	Argentina U–21	22	(10)
2024–	Argentina	18	(1)
Medal record
Men's field hockey
Representing Argentina
World Cup
Bronze medal – third place	2026 Wavre/Amstelveen
Pan American Cup
Gold medal – first place	2025 Montevideo	Team
Pan American Junior Championship
Gold medal – first place	2023 St. Michael	Team
Gold medal – first place	2024 Surrey	Team
South American Youth Games
Gold medal – first place	2022 Rosario	Team
Junior Pan American Games
Gold medal – first place	2025 Asunción	Team

Tomás Ruiz Saporti (born 6 May 2004) is an international field hockey player from Argentina.

== Personal life ==
Ruiz has a twin brother, Joaquín, who also plays international field hockey as a goalkeeper.

== Field hockey ==
=== Under–18 ===
In 2022, Ruiz made his debut for the Argentina U–18 team. He was a member of the squad at the III South American Youth Games in Rosario. At the tournament, played in a Hockey5s format, he helped the side to a gold medal.

=== Under–21 ===
Since 2023, Ruiz has been a member of the Argentina U–21 squad. He made his first appearance with the team at the 2023 Pan American Junior Championship in Saint Michael. At the tournament he won a gold medal. He then went on the represent the team at the 2023 FIH Junior World Cup in Kuala Lumpur.

He was named captain of the national junior team in 2024, leading them to a gold medal at the 2024 Pan American Junior Championship in Surrey.

In 2025 he was named in the squad for the II Junior Pan American Games in Asunción.

=== Senior national team ===
Ruiz received hist first call-up to Los Leones in 2024. He was named in the squad to tour Europe during season five of the FIH Pro League. He earned his first senior international cap during an FIH Pro League match against Ireland in Antwerp.

In 2025 he appeared in the sixth season of the FIH Pro League, and was named in the squad for the 2025 Pan American Cup in Montevideo.
