= Donald Campbell (rugby union) =

Chilean rugby union footballer (1919–1944)

Donald Campbell (1919 – 12 September 1944) was a Chilean rugby union player. He played as a centre. Of Scottish descent, his father, Colin played football for Chile while his younger brother Ian also played rugby for Chile.

He played, like his brother, for Prince of Wales Country Club, from Santiago. He was an international player for Chile in two matches. The first took place on 12 August 1938 against Argentina in Buenos Aires. Chile lost 3-33. It was Chile's third international.

A dual British and Chilean citizen, he joined the Royal Air Force, in 1941. While raiding a synthetic oil plant at Wanne-Eickel, Nazi Germany on 12 September 1944, Campbell's Avro Lancaster crashed at Gelsenkirchen, killing all on board.

He was inducted at the IRB Hall of Fame in May 2012, among his brother Ian Campbell, who was present. Donald was represented by his son, Colin. Ian Campbell said:

This is a huge honour for me and I couldn't be more pleased at the fact that Donald has been included in this induction as well. He was my sporting hero. So much so that as a young boy all I wanted was to be able someday to play rugby, cricket or hockey (at all of which he excelled) with him when I grew up.
