= Copa Centenario Revolución de Mayo =

Tournament details
- Host country: Argentina
- City: Buenos Aires
- Dates: 29 May – 12 June 1910
- Teams: 3 (from 3 confederations)
- Venue(s): 2 (in 1 host city)

Final positions
- Champions: Argentina
- Runners-up: Uruguay
- Third place: Chile

Tournament statistics
- Matches played: 3
- Goals scored: 14 (4.67 per match)
- Attendance: 16,500 (5,500 per match)
- Top scorer(s): (Argentina) Harry Hayes

The Copa Centenario Revolución de Mayo was an international football tournament, held in Argentina from 29 May to 12 June 1910, and organized by the Argentine Football Association. It was the first international tournament in South America where more than two football nations participated. The "Copa Centenario" is considered a predecessor to the South American Championship, later renamed "Copa América".

This contest was held in honor of the 100th anniversary of the May Revolution. Previous to that, the only international competitions in South America had been contested by the national teams of Uruguay and Argentina only. Those competitions included Copa Newton, Copa Lipton, Copa Premier Honor Argentino, and Copa Premier Honor Uruguayo.

Because of having featured three of the subsequent four founding members of CONMEBOL, the Copa Centenario Revolución de Mayo was sometimes called "the first Copa América". However, CONMEBOL recognizes the 1916 South American Championship as the first edition of the competition.

The tournament was contested in a round-robin format between the national teams of Argentina, Chile and Uruguay. All three games were played in Buenos Aires, the first in Club Colegiales Stadium (Note: The first stadium of C.A. Colegiales was located on Blandengues (current Avenida del Libertador) and Manzanares in the Núñez district.) and the rest in Gimnasia y Esgrima Stadium.

== Squads ==
For a complete list of participating squads see: Copa Centenario Revolución de Mayo squads

== Standings ==
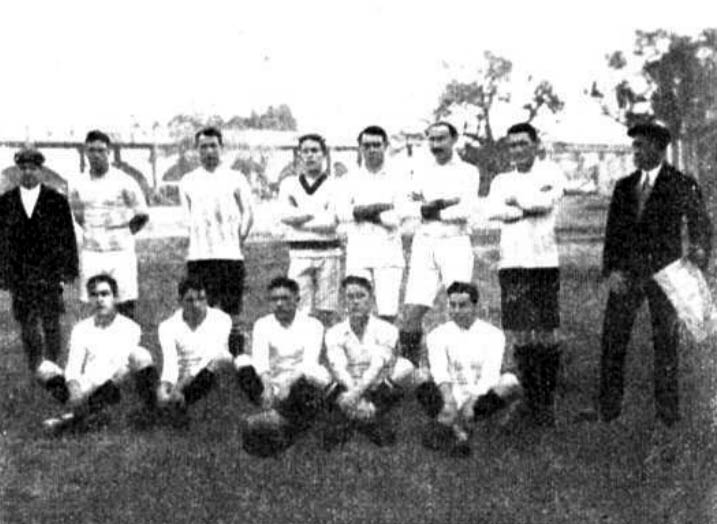
The Argentina team won the competition

Team	Pld	W	D	L	GF	GA	GD	Pts
Argentina	2	2	0	0	9	2	+7	4
Uruguay	2	1	0	1	4	4	0	2
Chile	2	0	0	2	1	8	−7	0

== Matches ==
29 May 1910

Uruguay	3–0	Chile
Piendibene 6'; Bracchi 75'; Buck 85'

Colegiales Stadium, Buenos Aires
Attendance: 6,000
Referee: José Susán (Argentina)

5 June 1910

Argentina	5–1	Chile
Viale 16'; Hayes 26', 40'; Weiss 66'; Susán 82'	Report	Campbell 50'

Gimnasia y Esgrima, Buenos Aires
Attendance: 2,500
Referee: León Peyrou (Uruguay)

12 June 1910

Argentina	4–1	Uruguay
Viale 15'; Hayes 43'; Watson Hutton 50'; Susán 64'	Report	Piendibene 58'

Gimnasia y Esgrima, Buenos Aires
Attendance: 8,000
Referee: Armando Bergalli (Chile)

== Goalscorers ==
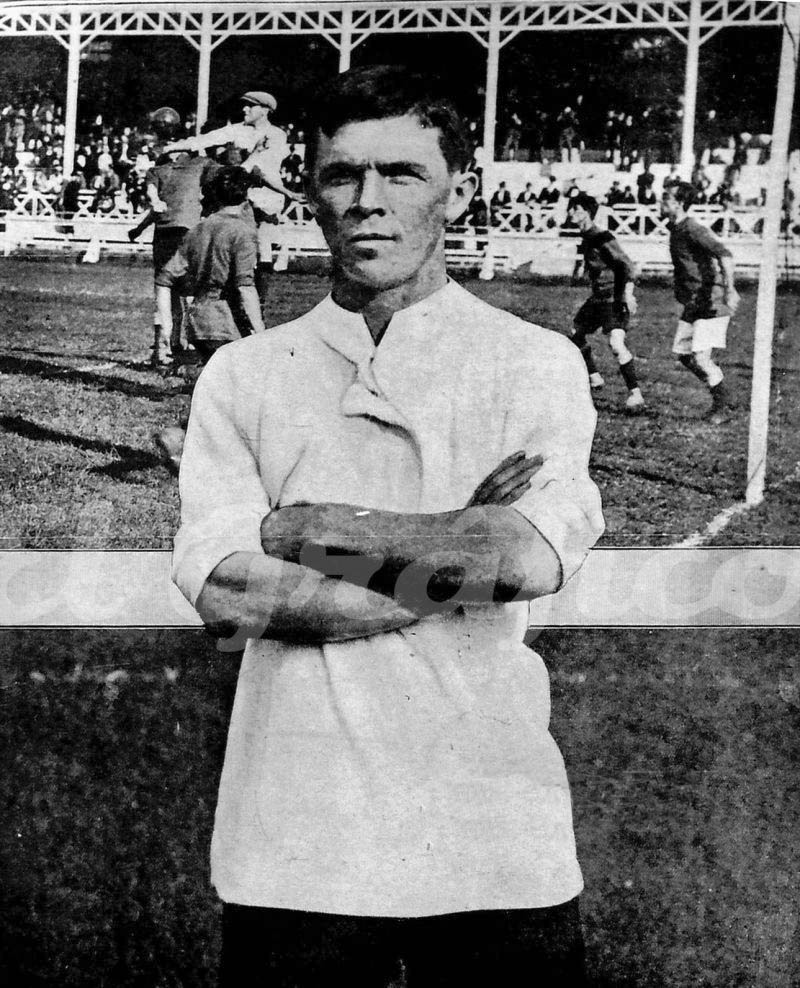
Argentine Harry Hayes, top scorer of the competition

There were 14 goals scored in 3 matches, for an average of 4.67 goals per match.

3 goals

- (Argentina) Harry Hayes

2 goals

- (Argentina) Maximiliano Susán
- (Argentina) José N. Viale
- (Uruguay) José Piendibene

1 goal

- (Argentina) Arnold Watson Hutton
- (Argentina) Gottlob E. Weiss
- (Chile) Colin Campbell
- (Uruguay) José Bracchi
- (Uruguay) Robert Sidney Buck

Source: RSSSF

== See also ==
- Copa América
- Argentina Centennial
