= Robert Sidney Buck =

Argentine footballer (1884-1960)

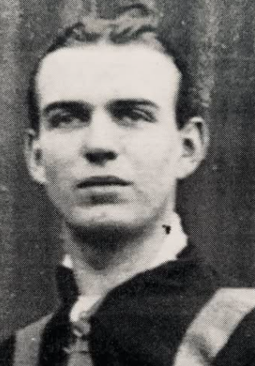

Personal information
- Full name: Robert Sidney Buck
- Date of birth: 27 November 1884
- Date of death: 15 May 1960 (aged 75)
- Position: Right winger

Senior career*
Years	Team	Apps	(Gls)
- Montevideo Wanderers
- Quilmes

International career
1909–1910	Uruguay	3	(3)
1912	Argentina	1	(0)
- * Club domestic league appearances and goals

Robert Sidney Buck (27 November 1884 – 15 May 1960) was a footballer who played international football for both Argentina and Uruguay.

== Club career ==
Buck played for Montevideo Wanderers F.C. and Quilmes Atlético Club.

== International career ==
Buck made his debut for Uruguay against Argentina in a Copa Newton match in Montevideo. He later represented Uruguay at the unofficial 1910 Copa América where he scored one goal for the tournament.

In 1912 Buck played one match for Argentina against Uruguay in Montevideo.
