= Colin Campbell (footballer, born 1883) =

Chilean-Argentine footballer (1883–1972)

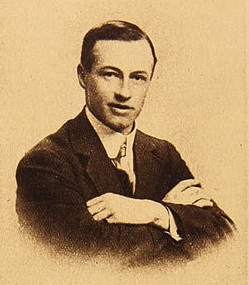
- Campbell in 1926

Personal information
- Full name: Colin Campbell Lazonby
- Date of birth: 20 February 1883
- Place of birth: Callao, Peru
- Date of death: 23 May 1972 (aged 84)
- Position: Inside right

Senior career*
Years	Team	Apps	(Gls)
- Estudiantes
- Santiago National
1922–1927	English FC		

International career
1907	Argentina	1	(0)
1910	Chile	4	(1)
- * Club domestic league appearances and goals

Colin Campbell Lazonby (20 February 1883 – 23 May 1972) was a footballer who played international football for both Argentina and Chile. Campbell played club football for Santiago National and was a Chilean squad member at the Copa Centenario Revolución de Mayo in 1910.

== Personal life ==
Campbell was born in Callao, Peru, to Scottish parents. Later, he moved to Valparaíso, Chile, and married Margaret McLaen.

His sons Donald and Ian both played rugby for Chile.
