= Oxford and Cambridge Club =

London club

Coordinates: 51.5056°N 0.1365°W

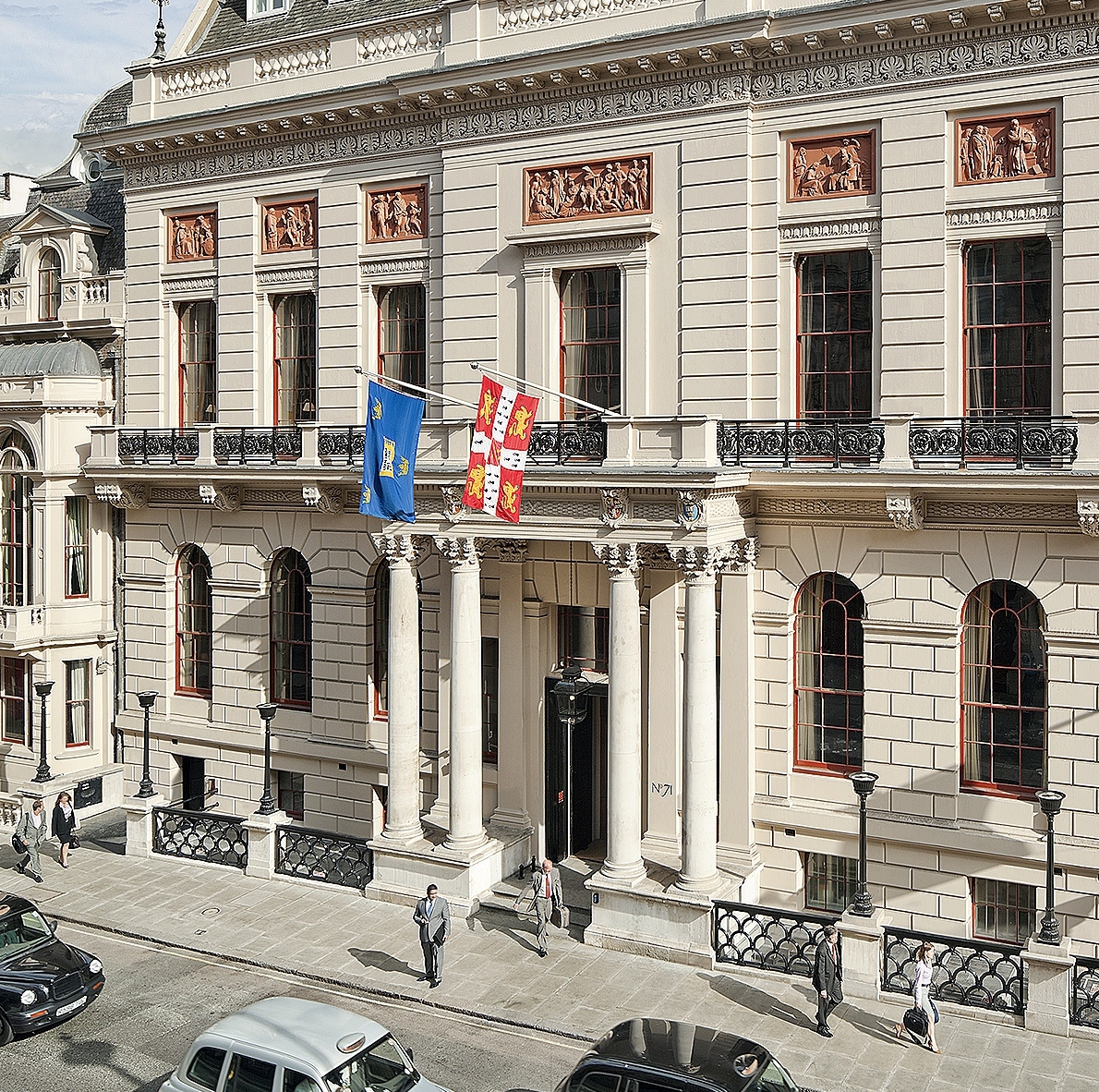
- The Club house
- Interactive map of the Oxford and Cambridge Club area
- Former names: The United University Club (1821), The Oxford and Cambridge University Club (1830)

General information
- Location: 71–77 Pall Mall, London, England
- Opened: 1838

Technical details
- Floor count: 4

Design and construction
- Architect: Sir Robert Smirke

Other information
- Number of rooms: 44
- Number of suites: 3

Website
- Official website

The Oxford and Cambridge Club is a traditional London club. Membership is largely restricted to those who are members of the universities of Oxford and Cambridge, including men and women who have a degree from or who are current students of either university.

The club is the result of a number of amalgamations of university clubs, most recently that of 1972 between the United University Club, founded in 1821, and the Oxford and Cambridge University Club, founded in 1830. From 1972 until 2001 the club was known as the United Oxford and Cambridge University Club. Women have been admitted as full members since 1997.

The club is based at 71–77 Pall Mall, in a purpose-built, Grade II* listed club house designed by Sir Robert Smirke.

== History ==
The present-day Oxford and Cambridge Club is the result of the 1972 merger of the United University Club and of the Oxford and Cambridge University Club. The United University Club was founded in 1821 for members of the Universities of Oxford and Cambridge. As a result of its lengthy waiting list, in 1830 the Oxford and Cambridge University Club was founded.

After the Second World War, both clubs, along with much of Clubland, fell into financial difficulties. In 1967, in an attempt to improve its financial position, the Oxford and Cambridge University Club began to admit to its membership graduates of any university in the world, while the United University Club rejected the idea. In March 1972, the two clubs merged, and membership was restricted once again to members of Oxford and Cambridge. Initially the new club, known as the United Oxford and Cambridge University Club, was based at the United University Club club house at 1 Suffolk Street. In 1973 the club was moved to the premises of the former United University Club on Pall Mall, which it still occupies today. In 2001, it changed its name to the Oxford and Cambridge Club.

Originally, women were only admitted as associate members. The club's membership policy came under attack in the mid-1990s. In February 1995, a statement signed by the heads of more than 70 Oxford and Cambridge colleges, two vice chancellors, and Oxford's chancellor, declared that the two universities were disassociating from the club "because of what they call[ed] its 'offensive' and 'discriminatory' policies to women". Dr Peter North, the vice chancellor of Oxford, stated at the time that the "'university council has asked the law department to consider our legal position in relation to the use of the universities' names and our coats of arms'". Four months later, the club voted to allow lady associate members "access to the main staircase and the library", provided they pay an extra fee of £100. In February 1996, members of the club voted to admit women as full members. Queen Margrethe II of Denmark became the club's first Honorary Lady Member in 1997. In June 2017 the club elected its first female chair.

== Membership ==
Membership, which is by election, is open to men and women who have received a degree or honorary degree from either the University of Oxford or the University of Cambridge, have been granted MA status or have been admitted as a full member of a college or hall in either university, or are members of the Congregation of the University of Oxford or the Regent House of the University of Cambridge. New members must be proposed and seconded by two current club members. One of the ways in which the club fosters its relationship with the two universities is by offering honorary membership for their terms of office to the vice chancellors and heads of house.

== Club house and facilities ==
The club house, a Grade II* listed building, was designed for the Oxford and Cambridge University Club by Sir Robert Smirke (perhaps best known for the British Museum). It opened to members in 1838. The facade is an important example of the Greek Revival style with which Smirke was particularly associated. In 1952 the club extended its premises to incorporate the neighbouring house, 77 Pall Mall, formerly the home of Princess Marie Louise, a granddaughter of Queen Victoria.

Facilities available to members include bedrooms, an opulent 'coffee room' (the traditional name for the principal dining room), serving breakfast, lunch, and dinner seven days a week, two bars, two squash courts, a billiard room, a well-maintained library of over 20,000 books with its own librarian, a roof terrace, and a small business area. The club arranges social, literary and sporting events. Members may also hire the club's function rooms for social or business purposes.

== Data theft ==
In November 2017, a backup computer drive containing the personal details of 5000 of the club's members, among them Stephen Fry and Lord Rees, was stolen from a locked room inside the premises. The information stored on it is said to include names, home addresses, phone numbers, and some bank details.

== Notable members ==
- Martin Amis
- Clement Attlee
- Lord Blake
- Benazir Bhutto
- Iftikhar Bukhari
- Anthony Bull
- Sir Henry Campbell-Bannerman
- George Canning
- Sir Raymond Carr
- Lord Casey
- William Cavendish, 7th Duke of Devonshire
- Sir J. E. Eardley-Wilmot, Bart
- Edward VII
- T. S. Eliot
- Stephen Fry
- William Ewart Gladstone
- Charles Grey, 2nd Earl Grey
- General Sir John Hackett
- William Harcourt
- Harold Macmillan
- Lord Melbourne
- Lord Houghton
- Roy Jenkins (honorary member)
- Anthony Kelly
- Granville Leveson-Gower
- Queen Margrethe II of Denmark (honorary member)
- Sir John Mowbray, 1st Baronet
- Chris Patten (honorary member)
- Prince Philip, Duke of Edinburgh (honorary member)
- Stuart Piggott
- Martin Rees, Baron Rees of Ludlow
- Henry Temple, 3rd Viscount Palmerston
- Antony Armstrong-Jones, 1st Earl of Snowdon
- William Makepeace Thackeray
- Arthur Wellesley, 1st Duke of Wellington (honorary member)
- Prince William Frederick, Duke of Gloucester and Edinburgh
- Lord Wolfenden
- Charles Wordsworth

== See also ==
- List of London's gentlemen's clubs
