= 2023 Men's Junior Pan American Championship =

Field hockey tournament

Tournament details
- Host country: Barbados
- City: Bridgetown
- Dates: 10–17 April
- Teams: 7 (from 1 confederation)
- Venue: Wildey Hockey Centre

Final positions
- Champions: Argentina (12th title)
- Runner-up: Canada
- Third place: Chile

Tournament statistics
- Matches played: 15
- Goals scored: 70 (4.67 per match)
- Top scorer: (Argentina) Iñaki Minadeo (6 goals)
- Best player: (Argentina) Joaquín Toscani
- Best goalkeeper: (Canada) Armaan Bagri

The 2023 Men's Junior Pan American Championship was the 13th edition of the Men's Pan American Junior Championship, the men's international under-21 field hockey championship of the Americas organized by the Pan American Hockey Federation.

The tournament was held alongside the women's tournament at the Wildey Hockey Centre in Bridgetown, Barbados and took take place from 10 to 17 April 2023. The tournament served as a direct qualifier for the 2023 Junior World Cup, with the three best placed teams qualifying.

Argentina won their 12th title by defeating Canada 6–1 in the final. The defending champions Chile won the bronze medal by defeating the United States 4–1.

== Preliminary round ==
=== Pool A ===
Pos	Team	Pld	W	D	L	GF	GA	GD	Pts	Qualification
1	Argentina	2	2	0	0	18	0	+18	6	Semi-finals
2	Chile	2	1	0	1	2	7	−5	3	Semi-finals
3	Brazil	2	0	0	2	0	13	−13	0	

Source: FIH
Rules for classification: 1) points; 2) matches won; 3) goal difference; 4) goals for; 5) head-to-head result; 6) field goals for.

10 April 2023
09:00

Argentina	11–0	Brazil
Bonanno 2'; Infanzón 7', 48'; Rodríguez 25'; Minadeo 34', 47'; Fernández 39'; Montrasi 39', 40', 55'; T. Ruiz 54'	Report

Umpires:
Pambavasan Manikandan (CAN)
Shane Lewis (BAR)

11 April 2023
13:30

Chile	0–7	Argentina
	Report	Bahl 15'; Capurro 23'; Aguirre Gómez Corta 34'; Infanzón 40'; Fortes 41'; Bonanno 46'; Toscani 54'

Umpires:
Pambavasan Manikandan (CAN)
Brian Tyson (USA)

12 April 2023
15:30

Brazil	0–2	Chile
	Report	Wolansky 2', 27'

Umpires:
Shane Lewis (BAR)
Brian Tyson (USA)

=== Pool B ===
Pos	Team	Pld	W	D	L	GF	GA	GD	Pts	Qualification
1	Canada	3	3	0	0	15	0	+15	9	Semi-finals
2	United States	3	2	0	1	6	4	+2	6	Semi-finals
3	Guyana	3	1	0	2	1	8	−7	3	
4	Barbados (H)	3	0	0	3	0	10	−10	0	

Source: FIH
Rules for classification: 1) points; 2) matches won; 3) goal difference; 4) goals for; 5) head-to-head result; 6) field goals for.
(H) Hosts

10 April 2023
11:00

United States	3–0	Guyana
Katz 2', 50'; Grewal 17'	Report

Umpires:
Kevin George (TTO)
Ricardo Albertz (CHI)

10 April 2023
13:30

Canada	6–0	Barbados
Loh 7', 21'; Thind 50', 51', 52', 53'	Report

Umpires:
Reinier Diaz (CUB)
Juan Rodriguez (ARG)

11 April 2023
15:30

Barbados	0–1	Guyana
	Report	Favorite 14'

Umpires:
Ricardo Albertz (CHI)
Kevin George (TTO)

12 April 2023
09:00

United States	0–4	Canada
	Report	Gill 12'; Aranha 22'; Loh 37'; Sidhu 54'

Umpires:
Reinier Diaz (CUB)
Juan Rodriguez (ARG)

13 April 2023
13:30

Canada	5–0	Guyana
De Souza 30'; Nicholson 34'; Loh 36'; Sidhu 39'; Aranha 45'	Report

Umpires:
Ricardo Albertz (CHI)
Reinier Diaz (CUB)

13 April 2023
15:30

Barbados	0–3	United States
	Report	Civetta 6'; Johal 9', 32'

Umpires:
Kevin George (TTO)
Juan Rodriguez (ARG)

== Fifth to seventh place classification ==
=== Bracket ===
Cross-over
15 April
Brazil	2
Barbados	1

Fifth place
17 April
Guyana (p.s.o.)	2 (3)
Brazil	2 (2)

=== Cross-over ===
15 April 2023
09:45

Brazil	2–1	Barbados
Sauerbronn 12'; Varela 49'	Report	Wharton 28'

Umpires:
Juan Rodriguez (ARG)
Kevin George (TTO)

=== Fifth place game ===
17 April 2023
09:45

Guyana	2–2	Brazil
Favorite 27'; Williams 35'	Report	Varela 29'; Santoro 34'
Penalties
Woodroffe (penalty shoot-out scored); Savory (penalty shoot-out scored); Garnett (penalty shoot-out missed); Williams (penalty shoot-out scored)	3–2	(penalty shoot-out scored) Godoy; (penalty shoot-out scored) Giro; (penalty shoot-out missed) Ludueña; (penalty shoot-out missed) Varela; (penalty shoot-out missed) Cursino

Umpires:
Juan Rodriguez (ARG)
Pambavasan Manikandan (CAN)

== First to fourth place classification ==
=== Bracket ===
Semi-finals
15 April
Argentina	7
United States	0
15 April
Chile	1 (1)
Canada (p.s.o.)	1 (3)

Final
17 April
Argentina	6
Canada	1
Third place
17 April
United States	1
Chile	4

=== Semi-finals ===
15 April 2023
12:00

Argentina	7–0	United States
Minadeo 10', 29', 38'; Poletti 12', 57'; Fortes 30'; Infanzón 42'	Report

Umpires:
Reinier Diaz (CUB)
Pambavasan Manikandan (CAN)

15 April 2023
15:30

Chile	1–1	Canada
Wolansky 43'	Report	Dhadda 47'
Penalties
Cerda (penalty shoot-out missed); Wolansky (penalty shoot-out scored); Valenzuela (penalty shoot-out missed); Richard (penalty shoot-out missed)	1–3	(penalty shoot-out missed) Miranda; (penalty shoot-out scored) J. Sidhu; (penalty shoot-out scored) M. Sidhu; (penalty shoot-out scored) Loh

Umpires:
Brian Tyson (USA)
Shane Lewis (BAR)

=== Third place game ===
17 April 2023
12:30

United States	1–4	Chile
Eisner 44'	Report	Loehnert Baeza 3', 33'; Acevedo 24'; De Witt 26'

Umpires:
Shane Lewis (BAR)
Kevin George (TTO)

=== Final ===
17 April 2023
15:30

Argentina	6–1	Canada
Capurro 2', 24', 28', 38'; Poletti 19'; Minadeo 53'	Report	Sidhu 34'

Umpires:
Ricardo Albertz (CHI),
Brian Tyson (USA)

== Statistics ==
=== Final standings ===
Pos	Team	Qualification
1st place, gold medalist(s)	Argentina	2023 Junior World Cup
2nd place, silver medalist(s)	Canada	2023 Junior World Cup
3rd place, bronze medalist(s)	Chile	2023 Junior World Cup
4	United States	
5	Guyana	
6	Brazil	
7	Barbados (H)	

Source: FIH
(H) Host

=== Goalscorers ===
There were 70 goals scored in 15 matches, for an average of 4.67 goals per match.

6 goals

- (Argentina) Iñaki Minadeo

5 goals

- (Argentina) Bautista Capurro

4 goals

- (Argentina) Ramiro Infanzón
- (Canada) Hudson Loh
- (Canada) Robin Thind

3 goals

- (Argentina) Juan Montrasi
- (Argentina) Bautista Poletti
- (Chile) Sebastián Wolansky

2 goals

- (Argentina) Agustín Bonanno
- (Argentina) Bautista Fortes
- (Brazil) Lucas Varela
- (Canada) Brooklyn Aranha
- (Canada) Jyothswaroop Sidhu
- (Chile) Sebastian Loehnert Baeza
- (Guyana) Shaquon Favorite
- (United States) Gurcharan Johal
- (United States) Wyatt Katz

1 goal

- (Argentina) Marco Aguirre Gómez Corta
- (Argentina) Francisco Bahl
- (Argentina) Juan Fernández
- (Argentina) Nicolás Rodríguez
- (Argentina) Tomás Ruiz
- (Argentina) Joaquín Toscani
- (Barbados) Kanye Wharton
- (Brazil) Luiz Santoro
- (Brazil) Frederico Sauerbronn
- (Canada) Leighton De Souza
- (Canada) Satpreet Dhadda
- (Canada) Ravpreet Gill
- (Canada) Jude Nicholson
- (Canada) Maansarovar Sidhu
- (Chile) Joaquin Acevedo
- (Chile) Alexei De Witt
- (Guyana) Warren Williams
- (United States) Luca Civetta
- (United States) Brett Eisner
- (United States) Mehtab Grewal

Source: FIH

== See also ==
- 2023 Women's Junior Pan American Championship
