= Prince of Wales Country Club =

Recreation club in Santiago, Chile

Coordinates: 33°26′10″S 70°34′21″W

Prince of Wales Country Club is a Chilean country club founded in 1925, taking its name from the then Prince of Wales, later to be King Edward VIII who opened the club. Originally it was located in Tobalaba and is now situated in Francisco Bilbao Avenue. The club provides multiple sports facilities including golf, rugby union, field hockey, tennis, football, squash and padel. It also has gymnasia, fitness classes and hosts cultural and social events. A cricket ground is also located there with a capacity for 800 spectators. The cricket ground has hosted touring sides such as the MCC.

The Prince of Wales Country Club rugby team holds seven titles of the National Championship of Chile, two of which were tied. Their first win was in 1948, the inaugural season of the championship, and they won it seven times between then and 1971. They won it again after 43 years, beating Craighouse Old Boys in the National Final of 2015. The rugby ground has hosted international matches such as the 2004 Latin Cup match between Chile and Portugal. Notable players include the brothers Donald and Ian Campbell who both played for Chile, although Donald was killed while serving in the Royal Air Force during World War II.

The club also hosted the qualifying tournament for field hockey for the 2008 Olympic Games in Beijing from which Great Britain qualified at India's expense. This was the first time India had failed to qualify for the Olympic hockey tournament since 1928. In addition, the Prince of Wales Country Club has played host to international golf tournaments.
