= 2024–25 Men's FIH Pro League squads =

This article lists the squads of all participating teams in the 2024–25 Men's FIH Pro League.

== Argentina ==
The following is the Argentina squad for the 2024–25 FIH Pro League.

Head coach: Lucas Rey

1. Tomás Santiago (GK)
2. Agustín Machelett
3. Nicolás Rodríguez
4. Juan Catán
5. Facundo Zárate
6. Matteo Fernández
7. Nicolás Keenan
8. Tobías Martins
9. Maico Casella
10. Nicolás Della Torre
11. Lucas Toscani
12. Neheun Hernando (GK)
15. Tomás Ruíz
16. Joaquín Toscani
17. Santiago Tarazona
18. Facundo Sarto
19. Lautaro Domene
20. Matías Andreotti
21. Tomás Domene
22. Matías Rey (C)
23. Lucas Martínez
24. Joaquín Ruíz (GK)
27. Tadeo Marcucci
28. Ignacio Ibarra
29. Thomas Habif
30. Agustín Bugallo
31. Bautista Capurro
32. Bruno Correa
33. Lucío Méndez
35. Ignacio Nardolillo
38. Agustín Bonanno
41. Iñaki Minadeo
42. Gonzalo Yanello (GK)
45. Iñaki Suárez
55. Felipe Merlini

== Australia ==
The following is the Australia squad for the 2024–25 FIH Pro League.

Head coach: Mark Hager

1. Lachlan Sharp
2. Thomas Craig
3. Corey Weyer
4. Jake Harvie
5. Cooper Burns
6. Anand Gupte
7. Nathan Ephraums
9. Liam Henderson
10. Joshua Beltz
12. Jed Snowden (GK)
13. Blake Govers
16. Timothy Howard (C)
17. Thomas Harvie
19. Craig Marais
20. Ky Willott
21. Jack Welch
23. Hayden Beltz
24. Cambell Geddes
25. Nathan Czinner
26. James Collins
27. Joel Rintala
28. Ashleigh Thomas (GK)
29. Timothy Brand
32. Jeremy Hayward

The remainder of the squad is as follows:

15. Jayden Atkinson
45. Christian Starkie (GK)
46. Hayden Pease
48. Davis Atkin
56. Connar Otterbach
58. Oliver Higgns (GK)
60. Mitchell Nicholson (GK)
61. Benjamin White
64. Dylan Downey
72. Nye Roberts-Campello
74. Daykin Stanger
75. Oliver Stebbings
77. Max Freedman
82. Dylan Brick

== Belgium ==
The following is the Belgium squad for the 2024–25 FIH Pro League.

Head coach: Shane McLeod

1. Simon Vandenbroucke (GK)
4. Arthur Van Doren (C)
5. Arno van Dessel
6. Lucas Balthazar
7. Thibeau Stockbroekx
9. Maxime van Oost
10. William Ghislain
11. Tommy Willems
12. Gauthier Boccard
13. Nicolas de Kerpel
14. Loic Van Doren (GK)
16. Alexander Hendrickx
17. Guillaume Hellin
18. Roman Duvekot
21. Vincent Vanasch (GK)
22. Victor Foubert
23. Arthur de Sloover (C)
24. Antoine Kina
26. Victor Wegnez
27. Tom Boon
28. Tobias Biekens
30. Nelson Onana
33. Hugo Labouchere
34. Olivier Biekens
37. Thomas Crols
43. Boris Feldheim (GK)
53. Charles Langendries
58. Jack Vloeberghs
61. Alexis van Havere (GK)

The remainder of the squad is as follows:

17. Guillermo Hainaut
35. Dylan Englebert
36. Emile Esquelin

== England ==
The following is the England squad for the 2024–25 FIH Pro League.

Head coach: Zak Jones

2. Nicholas Park
3. Jack Waller
4. Rohan Bhuhi
5. David Ames
7. Zachary Wallace
8. Jacob Payton
9. Henry Croft
11. Ian Sloan
12. Jack Turner
13. Samuel Ward (C)
14. James Albery
15. Phillip Roper
16. James Mazarelo (GK)
17. Stuart Rushmere
18. Timothy Nurse (C)
19. David Goodfield
20. Oliver Payne (GK)
22. David Condon
23. Nicholas Bandurak
24. James Oates
26. James Gall
27. Liam Sanford
29. Thomas Sorsby
30. Conor Williamson (C)
31. William Calnan
32. James Carleton (GK)
33. Samuel Hooper
45. George Pinner (GK)
46. Samuel Taylor
47. Benjamin Fox
48. Rory Penrose
49. Ellis Robson
77. Matthew Ramshaw

== Germany ==
The following is the Germany squad for the 2024–25 FIH Pro League.

Head coach: André Henning

1. Alexander Stadler (GK)
2. Mathias Müller
3. Mats Grambusch
4. Lukas Windfeder (C)
5. Linus Müller
6. Raphael Hartkopf
7. Thies Prinz (C)
8. Benedikt Schwarzhaupt
10. Johannes Große
11. Constantin Staib
12. Timm Herzbruch
13. Paul-Philipp Kaufmann
14. Teo Hinrichs (C)
15. Tom Grambusch
16. Gonzalo Peillat
17. Christopher Rühr
18. Mario Schachner
19. Justus Weigand
20. Niklas Bosserhoff
21. Michel Struthoff
23. Martin Zwicker
24. Erik Kleinlein
25. Hannes Müller
26. Paul Smith
28. Moritz Rothländer
29. Malte Hellwig
30. Henrik Mertgens
31. Adrian Lehmann-Richter
32. Niklas Garst (GK)
33. Luca Wolff
34. Jakob Brilla
35. Hugo von Montgelas
38. Antheus Barry
39. Joshua Onyekwue-Nnaji (GK)
40. Ben Hasbach
41. Matteo Poljaric
42. Paul Glander
44. Moritz Ludwig
62. Elian Mazkour
65. Phillip Holzmüller
74. Jean-Paul Danneberg (GK)
77. Jasper Ditzer (GK)
97. Florian Sperling

== India ==
The following is the India squad for the 2024–25 FIH Pro League.

Head coach: (South Africa) Craig Fulton

2. Dilpreet Singh
3. Varun Kumar
4. Jarmanpreet Singh
6. Surender Kumar
7. Manpreet Singh
8. Hardik Singh
9. Gurjant Singh
10. Simranjeet Singh
11. Mandeep Singh
12. Krishan Pathak (GK)
13. Harmanpreet Singh (C)
14. Lalit Upadhyay
15. Nilam Xess
17. Sumit Walmiki
18. Nilakanta Sharma
19. Akash Soreng
20. Sundaram Rajawat
21. Shamsher Singh
22. Talem Priyobarta
23. Gurinder Singh
24. S. V. Sunil
25. Raj Kumar Pal
26. Mukesh Toppo
27. Akashdeep Singh
28. Ritik Kujur
29. Rabichandra Moirangthem
30. Amit Rohidas
31. Jugraj Singh
32. Vivek Prasad
33. Ashok Hettur
34. Sukhjeet Singh
35. Mohammed Raheel
36. Boby Singh Dhami
37. Sunit Lakra
38. Arshdeep Singh
39. Maninder Singh
40. Vishnukant Singh
42. Aditya Lalage
43. Uttam Singh
44. Mandeep Mor
47. Yashdeep Siwach
48. Dipsan Tirkey
49. Manjeet
50. Abhishek Nain
52. Pawan Rajbhar
70. Sanjay Rana
71. Pawan Malik (GK)
77. Suraj Karkera (GK)
78. Sourabh Anand Kushwaha
79. Sharda Nand Tiwari
82. Gurjot Singh
84. Amir Ali
95. Rajinder Singh
96. Araijeet Singh Hundal
97. Angad Bir Singh
98. Sudeep Chirmako
99. Shilanand Lakra

== Ireland ==
The following is the Ireland squad for the 2024–25 FIH Pro League.

Head coach: Mark Tumilty

1. David Harte (GK)
2. James Carr (GK)
3. Charlie Rowe
4. Luke Witherow
6. Luke Madeley
7. Timothy Cross
8. Jonathan McKee
9. Matthew Nelson
10. Daragh Walsh
11. Callum Robson
12. Kevin O'Dea
15. Kyle Marshall (C)
17. Sean Murray (C)
18. Mark McNellis
19. Peter McKibbin
20. Jeremy Duncan
21. James Milliken (GK)
22. Michael Robson
23. Benjamin Pasley
24. Benjamin Walker
25. Jonathan Lynch
26. Peter Brown
28. Benjamin Nelson
29. Lee Cole
30. Louis Rowe
31. Mark Ingram
32. Adam Walker
33. Matthew Walker
34. Rex Dunlop
35. Conor Empey
36. Samuel Hyland
37. Oliver Kidd
38. James Clark
39. Fergus Gibson
40. Benjamin Johnson
41. Benjamin Ryder
43. Luke Roleston (GK)
44. Mark Samuel
45. Nicholas Page
49. Alistair Empey
50. Mark Collins
51. Matthew McKee

== Netherlands ==
The following is the Netherlands squad for the 2024–25 FIH Pro League.

Head coach: Jeroen Delmee

1. Maurits Visser (GK)
2. Jip Janssen
4. Lars Balk
5. Bram van Battum
6. Jonas de Geus
7. Thijs van Dam
8. Thierry Brinkman (C)
9. Koen Bijen
10. Jorrit Croon
11. Terrance Pieters
12. Justen Blok
13. Joep Troost
14. Derck de Vilder
15. David Huussen
16. Floris Wortelboer
17. Teun Beins
18. Oliver Hortensius
19. Tjep Hoedemakers
20. Derk Meijer (GK)
21. Guus Jansen
22. Pepijn van der Heijden
23. Joep de Mol
24. Steijn van Heijningen
25. Max de Bie
27. Timo Boers
28. Lucas Veen
29. Tijmen Reyenga
32. Hidde Brink (GK)
33. Miles Bukkens
34. Daan Bonhof
35. Casper van der Veen
36. Boris Aardenburg
37. Menmo Boeren
38. Boris Burkhardt
39. Tim Knappen
40. Luke Dommershuijzen
41. Sheldon Schouten
42. Jasper Tukkers
45. Pepijn Reyenga
51. Duco Telgenkamp
77. Floris Middendorp

== Spain ==
The following is the Spain squad for the 2024–25 FIH Pro League.

Head coach: (Argentina) Maximiliano Caldas

1. Adrian Rafi (GK)
2. Alejandro Alonso (C)
3. Enrique Zorita
4. Álvaro Portugal
5. Jordi Bonastre
6. Xavier Gispert
7. Rafael Vilallonga
8. Marc Recasens
9. Álvaro Iglesias
10. José Basterra
11. Gerard Clapés
12. Marc Reyné
13. Eduard de Ignacio-Simó
14. Marc Miralles (C)
15. Luis Calzado (GK)
16. Rafael Revilla (GK)
17. Pepe Cunill
18. Joaquín Menini
19. César Curiel
20. Pau Cunill
21. Borja Lacalle
22. Pol Cabré-Verdiell
23. Marc Vizcaíno
24. Manuel Rodríguez
25. Pau Petchamé
26. Bruno Font
27. Pere Amat
28. Nicolás Álvarez
29. Aleix Bozal
30. Antonio Sánz
31. Gonzalo Quijano
32. Ignacio Álvarez
34. Ignacio Abajo
35. Iñaky Zaldúa
37. Andreas Rafi
62. Ignacio Cobos
66. Jan Capellades (GK)
67. Bruno Ávila
71. Oriol Bozal
80. Enric Miralles
87. Pablo Román
88. Xavier Barutell
