= 2023 Men's FIH Hockey Junior World Cup squads =

This article lists the confirmed squads for the 2023 Men's FIH Hockey Junior World Cup tournament held in Kuala Lumpur, Malaysia between 5 and 16 December 2023.

A flag is included for coaches that are of a different nationality than their own national team. Those marked in bold have been capped at full international level.

== Pool A ==
=== Argentina ===
The squad was announced on 7 November 2023.

Head coach: Juan Gilardi

1. Agustin Magdalena (GK)
5. Tomás Ruiz
6. Mateo Fernandez
8. Agustín Bonanno
9. Marco Aguirre Gómez Corta
10. Joaquín Toscani
11. Ramiro Infanzón
15. Joaquin Ruiz (GK)
16. Matías Rey
17. Guido Nobili
18. Lucas Redondo
19. Bautista Poletti
21. Bruno Correa
23. Matías Andreotti
24. Juan Fernández
29. Ignacio Persoglio
30. Nicolás Rodríguez
31. Bautista Capurro
35. Ignacio Nardolillo
41. Iñaki Minadeo (C)

=== Australia ===
The squad was announced on 17 November 2023.

Head coach: Jay Stacy

No.	Pos.	Player	Date of birth (age)	Caps	Goals	Club
27	GK	Oliver Higgins	13 October 2002 (aged 20)	4	0	(Australia) Suburban Lions
28	GK	Max Larkin	16 May 2003 (aged 19)	5	0	(Australia) Tassie Tigers
1	DF	Nye Roberts	24 January 2003 (aged 19)	5	0	(Australia) HC Melbourne
12	DF	Angus Adamson	2 July 2003 (aged 19)	5	0	(Australia) YMCC
13	DF	Dylan Downey	26 January 2005 (aged 17)	5	2	(Australia) NSW Pride
23	DF	Cambell Geddes	18 June 2002 (aged 20)	14	7	(Australia) Perth Thundersticks
25	DF	Michael Taylor	19 January 2002 (aged 20)	5	0	(Australia) Brisbane Blaze
2	MF	William Mathison	12 June 2002 (aged 20)	5	1	(Australia) Brisbane Blaze
6	MF	Liam Henderson	28 August 2003 (aged 19)	14	0	(Australia) HC Melbourne
7	MF	Lachlan Rogers	24 August 2004 (aged 18)	5	0	(Australia) Tassie Tigers
8	MF	Toby Mallon	20 July 2005 (aged 17)	9	0	(Australia) Briars
11	MF	Max Freedman	19 March 2003 (aged 19)	8	0	(Australia) YMCC
16	MF	Nathan Czinner	19 March 2002 (aged 20)	14	0	(Australia) NSW Pride
5	FW	Jake Lambeth	30 August 2002 (aged 20)	6	2	(Australia) Royals
9	FW	Diarmid Chappell	14 November 2003 (aged 19)	5	1	(Australia) Brisbane Blaze
19	FW	Craig Marais (C)	28 May 2002 (aged 20)	8	3	(Australia) HC Melbourne
21	FW	Cooper Burns	6 March 2002 (aged 20)	14	12	(Australia) HC Melbourne
24	FW	Brodee Foster	21 June 2002 (aged 20)	13	7	(Australia) Perth Thundersticks

=== Chile ===
Head coach: Matías Amoroso

1. Joaquin Acevedo
7. Francisco Cerda
8. Alexei De Witt
9. Felipe Duisberg
14. Sebastian Loehnert Baeza
15. Joaquín Muñoz
16. Felipe Richard
19. Axel Stein
20. Raimundo Valenzuela
23. Javier Vargas
24. Julián Villanueva (GK)
25. Vicente Wilhelmy
26. Sebastián Wolansky (C)
33. Gaspar Fosalba
34. Mateo Perret
35. Bruno Acevedo
36. Tomas Hasson
37. Teodoro Sinning (GK)

== Pool B ==
=== Egypt ===
Head coach: Moustafa Khalil

1. Ali Abdalla
3. Hesham Omar
4. Hosni Mohamed
5. Bakr Youssef
6. Fathalla Ziad
7. Fahmy Ahmed
9. Elhadi Ahmed
10. Ragab Hossameldin (C)
11. Adel Ziad
12. Reda Mohamed
13. Hassanein Mohamed
14. Mohamady Amro
15. Mokhtar Bassem
16. Hussin Mahmoud (GK)
17. Awad Hussein
20. Fouda Ahmed
22. Kamal Said
24. Abdelmonem Basel
26. Geneidy Mohamed (GK)
27. Taha Saber

=== France ===
Head coach: Frederic Soyez

1. Louis Haertelmeyer
2. Gaëtan Larnicol
3. Jules Bournac
4. Brieuc Delemazure
5. Stanislas Branicki
6. Tassilo Sura
7. Jules Verrier
8. Thibault Fouquet
9. Mathis Clément
10. Hugo Verrier
11. Noé Jouin
12. Gaspard Xavier
14. Gaspard Denis
15. Tom Gaillard
16. Rafael Stab
18. Victor Saint-Martin
20. Arthur Morcette
23. Marius Clément (GK)
28. Thomas Assoignon
31. Antoine Robert (GK)

=== Germany ===
Head coach: (Netherlands) Rein van Eijk

3. Ben Hasbach
4. Christian Franz
7. Fabio Seitz
8. Jan Cordes
10. Luis Hoechemer (C)
11. Hugo von Montgelas
12. Tom Schmidt-Didlaukies
14. Peer Hinrichs
15. Nikas Berendts
16. Antheus Barry
20. Florian Sperling
21. Matteo Poljaric (C)
23. Jakob Brilla
24. Liam Holdermann
25. Michel Struthoff
26. Aron Flatten
27. Paul Glander
29. Joshua Onyekwue Nnaji (GK)
35. Florian Simon (GK)
43. Leon Lindemann

=== South Africa ===
The squad was announced on 13 November 2023.

Head coach: Guy Elliott

No.	Pos.	Player	Date of birth (age)	Caps	Club
4		Nathan Ansell (Captain)	15 March 2002 (aged 20)	14	(South Africa) UCT Ikey Rangers
5		James Flint	6 April 2004 (aged 18)	9	(South Africa) Maties
6		Daniel Neuhoff	3 October 2004 (aged 18)	5	(South Africa) Maties
7		Hans Neethling	13 July 2002 (aged 20)	15	(South Africa) Maties
9		Cameron Le Forestier	4 September 2002 (aged 20)	21	(South Africa) UP Tuks
10		Ross Breytenbach	1 June 2004 (aged 18)	11	(South Africa) Jeppe
11		Damian Knott	15 April 2003 (aged 19)	15	(South Africa) WPCC
12		Sian Maart	30 March 2004 (aged 18)	4	(South Africa) UP Tuks
14		Caleb Oliphant	21 May 2002 (aged 20)	10	(South Africa) Maties
16		Thabang Jeyi	21 May 2003 (aged 19)	5	(South Africa) Langa
17		Ayakha Mthalane	5 June 2003 (aged 19)	15	(South Africa) UP Tuks
19	MF	Leruo Ditlhakanyane	20 July 2005 (aged 17)	4	(South Africa) D.H.S
21		Fawaaz Kahder	20 November 2002 (aged 20)	15	(South Africa) Beaulieu
22		Calvin Davis	22 November 2003 (aged 19)	10	(South Africa) UP Tuks
24	GK	Reece Govender	17 December 2002 (aged 20)	10	(South Africa) Wits
27	GK	Gianluca Virissimo	2 October 2003 (aged 19)	5	(South Africa) UCT Ikey Rangers
31		David Tshebi	21 December 2003 (aged 19)	4	(South Africa) Varsity
34		Jaydon Brooker	3 April 2005 (aged 17)	0	(South Africa) Jeppe

== Pool C ==
=== Canada ===
Canada announced their squad on 28 October 2023.

Head coach: Geoffrey Matthews

No.	Pos.	Player	Date of birth (age)	Caps	Club
1	MF	Callan McCulloch	6 February 2005 (aged 18)	5	
2	DF	Joshua Miranda	7 February 2004 (aged 19)	5	
4	DF	Grant Simpson	27 April 2004 (aged 19)	5	
5	DF	Satpreet Dhadda	9 September 2004 (aged 19)	5	
6	FW	Hudson Loh	24 July 2003 (aged 20)	5	
7	FW	Kirin Robinson	1 August 2004 (aged 19)	5	
8	MF	Noah Louie	18 March 2005 (aged 18)	5	
9	FW	Robin Thind	8 May 2006 (aged 17)	5	
10	MF	Leighton De Souza	4 September 2005 (aged 18)	5	
13	DF	Arjun Cheema	18 September 2003 (aged 20)	0	
14	MF	Julius D'Souza (Captain)	2 July 2002 (aged 21)	8	
15	FW	Ravpreet Gill	24 December 2004 (aged 18)	4	
17	MF	Jude Nicholson	14 May 2006 (aged 17)	5	
18	MF	Arshmit Pannu	18 September 2003 (aged 20)	0	
21	DF	Maansarovar Sidhu	19 July 2002 (aged 21)	5	
22	MF	Jyothswaroop Sidhu	19 July 2002 (aged 21)	11	
28	GK	Armaan Bagri	8 June 2003 (aged 20)	5	
30	GK	Guarav Ghai	26 September 2004 (aged 19)	5	

=== India ===
Head coach: C.R. Kumar

The final squad was announced on 14 November 2023.

No.	Pos.	Player	Date of birth (age)	Caps	Club
1	DF	Sharda Nand Tiwari	7 January 2004 (aged 18)	28	(India) Uttar Pradesh
3	MF	Sunit Lakra	2 June 2002 (aged 20)	15	
4	DF	Amandeep Lakra	26 May 2002 (aged 20)	21	(India) RSPB/Hockey Association of Odisha
5	MF	Poovanna CB	5 October 2002 (aged 20)	21	(India) Karnataka
6	DF	Amir Ali	2 May 2004 (aged 18)	20	(India) Uttar Pradesh
9	FW	Sudeep Chirmako	5 December 2002 (aged 20)	33	(India) Odisha
10	MF	Amandeep	20 December 2002 (aged 20)	21	(India) Chandigarh
11	FW	Boby Singh Dhami	1 July 2002 (aged 20)	19	Food Corporation of India/Haryana
12	FW	Sourabh Anand Kushwaha	16 September 2005 (aged 17)	4	(India) Uttar Pradesh
13	GK	Ranvijay Singh Yadav	10 July 2003 (aged 19)	4	(India) NCE, Sonipat
14	MF	Vishnukant Singh	10 August 2002 (aged 20)	44	(India) Uttar Pradesh
16	FW	Uttam Singh (Captain)	10 December 2002 (aged 20)	29	(India) Uttar Pradesh Hockey Academy
20	DF	Sunil JoJo	14 December 2002 (aged 20)	11	(India) RSPB/Jharkhand
27	GK	Mohit H.S.	27 February 2002 (aged 20)	21	(India) Karnataka
29	MF	Rabichandra Singh Moirangthem	3 August 2001 (aged 21)	23	(India) Petroleum Sports Promotion Board
30	FW	Aditya Lalage	15 January 2003 (aged 19)	11	(India) Maharashtra
32	DF	Rohit	23 March 2004 (aged 18)	21	(India) RSPB/Chandigarh
49	MF	Aditya Singh	1 December 2002 (aged 20)	0	(India) RSPB/NCE, Delhi
50	DF	Sukhvinder	14 May 2006 (aged 16)	5	(India) NCE, Sonipat
78	MF	Rajinder Singh	12 December 2002 (aged 20)	21	
90	FW	Araijeet Singh Hundal (Vice-captain)	21 January 2004 (aged 18)	22	(India) Punjab and Sind Bank

=== South Korea ===
Head coach: Jang Young

1. Choi Ji-ho
2. Hwang Keonyeol
6. Lee Sung-min
7. Kong Yoonho (C)
8. Cho Ghu-hyeong
9. Kim Min-kwon
10. Kim Jae-ho
11. Lee Seung-hwan
13. Kim Dae-hyun
14. Kim Yu-bin
15. Song Jeong-seob
17. Lim Jun-yeol
20. Park Geon-woo
21. Kim Se-yeon (GK)
25. Lim Do-hyun
26. Kim Sookyo (GK)
30. Park Hyun
99. Yoo Seung-ho

=== Spain ===
The squad was announced on 16 November 2023.

Head coach: Oriol Torras Puig

No.	Pos.	Player	Date of birth (age)	Caps	Club
1	GK	Jan Capellades	24 March 2004 (aged 19)	6	(Spain) Club Egara
2		Matias Barón	17 July 2006 (aged 17)	0	(Spain) Real Club de Polo
3		Aleix Bozal	29 June 2004 (aged 19)	4	(Spain) Junior FC
4		Guiu Corominas	6 June 2004 (aged 19)	4	(Spain) Atlètic Terrassa
5		Iñaky Zaldúa	26 February 2003 (aged 20)	9	(Spain) Real Club de Polo
6		Bruno Font	15 November 2004 (aged 19)	9	(Spain) Junior FC
7		Oriol Bozal	10 July 2002 (aged 21)	15	(Spain) Junior FC
8		Pere Amat	17 September 2004 (aged 19)	9	(Spain) Club Egara
9		Pol Cabré-Verdiell	22 April 2003 (aged 20)	15	(Spain) Atlètic Terrassa
10		Enric Miralles	8 June 2002 (aged 21)	9	(Spain) CD Terrassa
11		Pau Petchamé	21 January 2003 (aged 20)	9	(Spain) CD Terrassa
12		Ton Moran	11 January 2006 (aged 17)	0	(Spain) Club Egara
14		Nicolás Álvarez	4 January 2003 (aged 20)	4	(Spain) RS Tenis
17		Andreas Rafi (C)	24 April 2002 (aged 21)	9	(Germany) Mannheimer HC
19		Pablo Espino	28 March 2003 (aged 20)	4	(Spain) Junior FC
21		Ton Borràs	10 October 2003 (aged 20)	9	(Spain) Real Club de Polo
22		Xavier Barutell	5 June 2003 (aged 20)	15	(Spain) Atlètic Terrassa
25	GK	Fernando Díaz	20 February 2002 (aged 21)	4	(Spain) Complutense

== Pool D ==
=== Belgium ===
Belgium announced their squad on 26 October 2023.

Head coach: Jeroen Baart

No.	Pos.	Player	Date of birth (age)	Caps	Club
4	MF	Lucas Putters	25 January 2002 (aged 21)	10	(Belgium) Dragons
5	DF	Hugo Labouchere	7 February 2004 (aged 19)	0	(Belgium) Orée
6	FW	Diego Hainaut	19 November 2004 (aged 19)	0	(Belgium) Uccle Sport
7	MF	Victor Foubert	12 October 2002 (aged 21)	5	(Belgium) Dragons
8	MF	Nicolas Bogaerts	15 January 2004 (aged 19)	0	(Belgium) Orée
9	MF	Louis De Backer	27 February 2002 (aged 21)	5	(Belgium) Léopold
10	MF	Maximilian Langer	5 August 2006 (aged 17)	0	(Belgium) Orée
11	FW	Jack Vloeberghs	15 October 2003 (aged 20)	0	(Belgium) Herakles
12	FW	Max Luyten	5 November 2002 (aged 21)	5	(Belgium) Dragons
13	FW	Louis Depelsenaire	13 September 2002 (aged 21)	5	(Belgium) Waterloo Ducks
14	FW	Thomas Crols	11 September 2002 (aged 21)	5	(Belgium) Dragons
17	MF	Guillermo Hainaut	8 June 2002 (aged 21)	11	(Belgium) Uccle Sport
21	GK	Julien Le Maire	30 July 2002 (aged 21)	0	(Belgium) Herakles
23	DF	Lucas Balthazar	8 January 2006 (aged 17)	0	(Belgium) Uccle Sport
24	DF	Thomas Joye	24 February 2003 (aged 20)	5	(Belgium) Uccle Sport
26	MF	Charles Langendries	26 April 2006 (aged 17)	0	(Belgium) Waterloo Ducks
30	DF	Brieuc Petit	5 October 2003 (aged 20)	0	(Belgium) Waterloo Ducks
43	GK	Boris Feldheim	1 April 2002 (aged 21)	11	(Belgium) Daring

=== Netherlands ===
The Netherlands announced their squad on 2 November 2023.

Head coach: Jesse Mahieu

No.	Pos.	Player	Date of birth (age)	Caps	Club
1	GK	Nieki Verbeek	7 October 2004 (aged 19)	0	(Netherlands) Oranje-Rood
2		Pepijn van der Heijden	22 April 2003 (aged 20)	5	(Netherlands) Rotterdam
3		Mees Kurvers	24 October 2002 (aged 21)	0	(Netherlands) Den Bosch
4	DF	Timo Boers	10 October 2003 (aged 20)	0	(Netherlands) Den Bosch
7		Boris Aardenburg	6 February 2003 (aged 20)	5	(Netherlands) Pinoké
8	MF	Menno Boeren	12 May 2002 (aged 21)	11	(Netherlands) Rotterdam
9		Olivier Hortensius	4 September 2002 (aged 21)	11	(Netherlands) Rotterdam
10	MF	Guus Jansen	7 March 2002 (aged 21)	11	(Netherlands) Rotterdam
11	FW	Casper van der Veen	29 June 2004 (aged 19)	11	(Netherlands) Bloemendaal
12		Bouwe Buitenhuis	30 April 2002 (aged 21)	0	(Netherlands) Klein Zwitserland
14	FW	Duco Telgenkamp	17 July 2002 (aged 21)	5	(Netherlands) Kampong
15		Luke Dommershuijzen	11 April 2002 (aged 21)	10	(Netherlands) Amsterdam
16		Casper Berkman	8 April 2003 (aged 20)	5	(Netherlands) HGC
17	FW	Jan van 't Land	7 April 2005 (aged 18)	0	(Netherlands) HGC
18	MF	Gijs ter Braak	22 September 2004 (aged 19)	0	(Netherlands) Bloemendaal
20		Dylan Lucieer	4 April 2004 (aged 19)	0	(Netherlands) Rotterdam
22	GK	Daan Taphoorn	11 February 2003 (aged 20)	0	(Netherlands) HGC
23	MF	Lucas Veen	23 November 2003 (aged 20)	0	(Netherlands) HGC

=== New Zealand ===
Head coach: Aaron Ford

1. Ryan Parr
3. Matthew Wilson
5. James Hickson
6. Aidan Fraser
7. Joshua Irwin
8. Scott Cosslett
9. Patrick Ward
11. Daniel Torr
12. Benjamin Culhane (C)
13. Sam Lints
14. Luke Aldred
15. James Nicolson
16. Jordan Whittleston
17. Luke Elmes (GK)
18. Hayden Ganley (GK)
19. Jonty Elmes
20. Aiden Bax
21. Gus Nelson
