= 2021 Boys' EuroHockey U18 Championship =

Tournament details
- Host country: Spain
- City: Valencia
- Dates: 19–24 July
- Teams: 5 (from 1 confederation)
- Venue(s): Estadio Beteró

Final positions
- Champions: Germany (4th title)
- Runner-up: Netherlands
- Third place: Spain

Tournament statistics
- Matches played: 10
- Goals scored: 55 (5.5 per match)
- Top scorer(s): (Netherlands) Casper van der Veen (6 goals)

The 2021 Boys' EuroHockey U18 Championship was the 11th edition of the Boys' EuroHockey U18 Championship, the biennial international men's under-18 field hockey championship of Europe organized by the European Hockey Federation. It was held from 19 to 24 July 2021 at the Estadio Beteró in Valencia, Spain.

Germany won their fourth title, finishing top of the pool at the conclusion of the tournament.

== Qualified teams ==
| Dates | Event | Location | Quotas | Qualifier(s) |
|---|---|---|---|---|
| – | Host | | 1 | Spain |
| 15–21 July 2018 | 2018 EuroHockey Youth Championship | Santander, Spain | 5 | Belgium; ~~England~~^{[a]} Germany; Netherlands; ~~Ireland~~^{[a]} |
| 22–28 July 2018 | 2018 EuroHockey Youth Championship II | Cardiff, Wales | 2 | ~~Scotland~~^{[a]} Russia |
| Total | | | 8 | |

^[a] – Due to COVID-19 related travel restrictions, England, Ireland and Scotland all withdrew prior to the tournament.

== Standings ==
| Pos | Team | Pld | W | D | L | GF | GA | GD | Pts |
|---|---|---|---|---|---|---|---|---|---|
| 1st place, gold medalist(s) | Germany (C) | 4 | 4 | 0 | 0 | 16 | 4 | +12 | 12 |
| 2nd place, silver medalist(s) | Netherlands | 4 | 2 | 0 | 2 | 17 | 10 | +7 | 6 |
| 3rd place, bronze medalist(s) | Spain (H) | 4 | 2 | 0 | 2 | 9 | 9 | 0 | 6 |
| 4 | Belgium | 4 | 1 | 1 | 2 | 10 | 14 | −4 | 4 |
| 5 | Russia | 4 | 0 | 1 | 3 | 3 | 18 | −15 | 1 |

Source: EuroHockey
Rules for classification: 1) points; 2) goal difference; 3) goals scored; 4) head-to-head result.
(C) Champions; (H) Hosts

== Fixtures ==
All times are local (UTC+2).

19 July 2021
09:00

| Netherlands | 8–0 | Russia |
|---|---|---|
| Van Bijnen 13', 51'; Van der Veen 15', 32'; Meijer 19'; Schulpen 40'; Telgenkamp 42'; Bukkens 53' | Report |

Umpires:
Ines El Hajem (FRA)
Corentin Hardy (BEL)

19 July 2021
11:15

| Germany | 5–1 | Belgium |
|---|---|---|
| Sperling 19', 58'; Holdermann 22'; Struthoff 40'; Poljaric 55' | Report | Labouchere 33' |

Umpires:
Alejandro Amarillas (ESP)
Luka Zupancič (AUT)

20 July 2021
09:00

| Netherlands | 4–5 | Belgium |
|---|---|---|
| Weterings 36'; Trieling 40'; Van der Veen 41'; Veen 60' | Report | Putters 2'; Delavignette 8'; Vloeberghs 28'; Depelsenaire 30'; Malherbe 60' |

Umpires:
Ines El Hajem (FRA)
Thomas Hinsken (GER)

20 July 2021
11:15

| Spain | 4–0 | Russia |
|---|---|---|
| Rafi 1'; Petchamé 21'; Albert 41'; Casas 59' | Report |

Umpires:
Lizelotte Wolter (NED)
Corentin Hardy (BEL)

21 July 2021
20:00

| Germany | 4–0 | Spain |
|---|---|---|
| Sperling 12'; Berendts 30'; Nyström 40'; Hinrichs 51' | Report |

Umpires:
Daniël van der Nat (NED)
Luka Zupancič (AUT)

22 July 2021
09:00

| Belgium | 2–2 | Russia |
|---|---|---|
| Depelsenaire 47'; Malherbe 50' | Report | Maniapov 43'; M. Birkin 44' |

Umpires:
Noelia Blanco (ESP)
Raphaël Adrian (GER)

23 July 2021
17:45

| Russia | 1–4 | Germany |
|---|---|---|
| Bereza 29' | Report | Sperling 3'; Berendts 13', 51'; Nyström 39' |

Umpires:
Daniël van der Nat (NED)
Thalia Bellemans (BEL)

23 July 2021
20:00

| Netherlands | 3–2 | Spain |
|---|---|---|
| Van der Veen 4', 29'; Van Bijnen 17' | Report | Casas 25'; Rafi 55' |

Umpires:
Raphaël Adrian (GER)
Thomas Hinsken (GER)

24 July 2021
16:45

| Germany | 3–2 | Netherlands |
|---|---|---|
| Struthoff 24'; Berendts 34'; Poljaric 44' | Report | Van der Veen 20'; Bukkens 44' |

Umpires:
Alejandro Amarillas (ESP)
Luka Zupancič (AUT)

24 July 2021
19:15

| Spain | 3–2 | Belgium |
|---|---|---|
| Rafi 2'; Clapés 32'; Espino 47' | Report | Delavignette 1'; Vloeberghs 13' |

Umpires:
Daniël van der Nat (NED)
Raphaël Adrian (GER)

== Goalscorers ==
There were 55 goals scored in 10 matches, for an average of 5.5 goals per match.

6 goals

- (Netherlands) Casper van der Veen

4 goals

- (Germany) Nikas Berendts
- (Germany) Florian Sperling

3 goals

- (Netherlands) Finn van Bijnen
- (Spain) Andreas Rafi

2 goals

- (Belgium) Hippolyte Delavignette
- (Belgium) Louis Depelsenaire
- (Belgium) Samuel Malherbe
- (Belgium) Jack Vloeberghs
- (Germany) Frederik Nyström
- (Germany) Matteo Poljaric
- (Germany) Michel Struthoff
- (Netherlands) Miles Bukkens
- (Spain) Maximiliano Casas

1 goal

- (Belgium) Hugo Labouchere
- (Belgium) Ralph Putters
- (Germany) Peer Hinrichs
- (Germany) Liam Holdermann
- (Netherlands) Timo Meijer
- (Netherlands) Pieter Schulpen
- (Netherlands) Duco Telgenkamp
- (Netherlands) Danilo Trieling
- (Netherlands) Lucas Veen
- (Netherlands) Alex Weterings
- (Russia) Dmitry Bereza
- (Russia) Marat Birkin
- (Russia) Marat Maniapov
- (Spain) Grau Albert
- (Spain) Jan Clapés
- (Spain) Pablo Espino
- (Spain) Pau Petchame

Source: EuroHockey
