= Pere Amat =

Spanish field hockey player (born 2004)

Personal information
- Full name: Pere Amat Casellas
- Born: 17 September 2004 (age 22) Terrassa, Spain

Sport
- Sport: Field hockey
- Position: Midfielder / Forward
- Club: Bloemendaal
Youth career
- Years: Team
- –2021: Club Egara
Senior career
Years	Team	Caps	Goals
2021–2026	Club Egara	-	-
2026–present	Bloemendaal	-	-
National team
Years	Team	Caps	Goals
2022–present	Spain U21	26	(4)
2022–present	Spain	34	(4)
Medal record
Representing Spain
Men's field hockey
FIH Hockey Junior World Cup
Silver medal – second place	2025 Tamil Nadu
Bronze medal – third place	2023 Kuala Lumpur
EuroHockey U21 Championship
Gold medal – first place	2024 Terrassa
EuroHockey U18 Championship
Bronze medal – third place	2021 Valencia
Men's indoor hockey
EuroHockey Indoor Championship
Bronze medal – third place	2026 Heidelberg

Pere Amat Casellas (born 17 September 2004) is a Spanish field hockey player who plays as a midfielder or forward for Dutch Hoofdklasse club Bloemendaal and the Spain national team.

== Personal life ==
Pere Amat was born and raised in Terrassa, Spain.

He comes from a hockey playing family. His grandfather, Pedro, great uncles, Francisco, Jaime and Juan, and second cousins Pol and Jaume all having represented the Spanish national team in international hockey.

== Club career ==
Amat started playing hockey when he was three years old at Club Egara, and he played for five seasons for the first team in the División de Honor. In 2026 he moved to the Netherlands to play for Bloemendaal.

== International career ==
=== Under–21 ===
Amat debuted for the Spanish U–21 side in 2022. He made his first appearances during the EuroHockey U–21 Championship in Ghent.

In 2023 he continued to represent the national junior squad. He made his first appearances for the year at Four–Nations Tournament in Düsseldorf. He went on to represent the team again later that year at the FIH Junior World Cup in Kuala Lumpur. At the tournament, he helped secure the side a bronze medal.

He won a second medal with the junior team in 2024, taking home gold at the EuroHockey U21 Championship in his home city of Terrassa.

=== Red Sticks ===
Following his junior debut, Amat received his first call up to the senior national squad. He made his senior international debut for the Red Sticks during the fourth season of the FIH Pro League. His first appearance came during a match against New Zealand in Bhubaneswar.
