= 2023 Boys' EuroHockey U18 Championship =

Tournament details
- Host country: Germany
- City: Krefeld
- Dates: 8–16 July
- Teams: 9 (from 1 confederation)
- Venue(s): Crefelder Hockey and Tennis Club 1890

Final positions
- Champions: Germany (5th title)
- Runner-up: Belgium
- Third place: Netherlands

Tournament statistics
- Matches played: 23
- Goals scored: 134 (5.83 per match)
- Top scorer(s): (Belgium) Charlie Langendries (Germany) Ben Hasbach (8 goals)
- Best player: (Belgium) Charlie Langendries
- Best goalkeeper: (Scotland) Calum Douglas

The 2023 Boys' EuroHockey U18 Championship was the 12th edition of the Boys' EuroHockey U18 Championship, the biennial international men's under-18 field hockey championship of Europe organized by the European Hockey Federation. It was held alongside the girls' tournament from 8 to 16 July 2023 in Krefeld, Germany at the Crefelder Hockey and Tennis Club 1890.

The hosts and defending champions Germany defended their title by defeating Belgium 3–2 in the final. The Netherlands won the bronze medal by defeating Spain 4–3.

== Qualified teams ==
Dates	Event	Location	Quotas	Qualifier(s)
19–24 July 2021	2021 EuroHockey U18 Championship	Valencia, Spain	7	Belgium; England; Germany; Ireland; Netherlands; ~~Russia~~ (Note: Russia were excluded from the tournament due to their involvement in the 2022 Russian invasion of Ukraine.); Scotland; Spain
18–24 July 2021	2021 EuroHockey U18 Championship II	Vienna, Austria	2	Austria; Poland
Total			9	

== Format ==
The nine teams were split into two groups of five and four teams. The top two teams advanced to the semi-finals to determine the winner in a knockout system. The bottom two teams of each pool competed for a spot in the 7th place game, whilst the fourth-placed team in pool A automatically moved onto this game. The third placed teams in each pool competed for 5th place. The last three teams were relegated to the U18 Championship II.

== Preliminary round ==
All times are local (UTC+2).

=== Pool A ===
Pos	Team	Pld	W	D	L	GF	GA	GD	Pts	Qualification or relegation
1	Belgium	4	4	0	0	21	3	+18	12	Qualification for the semi-finals
2	Germany (H)	4	3	0	1	22	3	+19	9	Qualification for the semi-finals
3	Scotland	4	1	0	3	5	14	−9	3	
4	Austria (R)	4	1	0	3	4	17	−13	3	Relegation to the U18 Championship II
5	Ireland (R)	4	1	0	3	4	19	−15	3	Relegation to the U18 Championship II

Source: EHF
Rules for classification: 1) points; 2) matches won; 3) goal difference; 4) goals for; 5) head-to-head result; 6) field goals for.
(H) Hosts; (R) Relegated

8 July 2023
10:00

Belgium	8–1	Scotland
Callewaert 13' van Heel 20'; Balthazar 27'; Fauchey 32', 37'; Langendries 36', 55'; Leeuw 42'	Report	Marsland 16'

Umpires:
Amy Jones (IRL)
Raphaël Adrien (GER)

8 July 2023
14:30

Austria	3–1	Ireland
Schiesser 29'; Morawec 54'; Meisel 58'	Report	Evans 22'

Umpires:
Lena McCrae (SCO)
Daniël van der Nat (NED)

9 July 2023
11:30

Belgium	8–0	Ireland
Langendries 10', 43', 57'; Cloetens 11'; Balthazar 15', 37'; Fauchey 30'; Hawaux 40'	Report

Umpires:
Bernhard Hajos (AUT)
Kevin Roberts (WAL)

9 July 2023
16:15

Germany	2–0	Scotland
Kossel 26'; Hasbach 45'	Report

Umpires:
Kamile Mockaityte (LTU)
Lucien van der Borght (BEL)

10 July 2023
17:45

Austria	0–12	Germany
	Report	Kossel 2', 52'; Warweg 14'; Berendts 23'; Hasbach 24', 26', 33', 40'; Scholz 40'; Stahl 56'; Muhle 58' von Gersum 60'

Umpires:
Zoe Hall (ENG)
Francesc Tormo (ESP)

11 July 2023
11:15

Ireland	3–2	Scotland
Evans 24', 56'; Mckee 55'	Report	Griffiths 10'; Bradley 21'

Umpires:
Raphaël Adrien (GER)
Pauline Cuypers (BEL)

12 July 2023
11:00

Scotland	2–1	Austria
Lobb 50'; Wilson 52'	Report	Meisel 59'

Umpires:
Kamile Mockaityte (LTU)
Amar Chudasama (ENG)

12 July 2023
17:45

Belgium	3–2	Germany
van Heel 34'; Cloetens 57'; Molenaar 60'	Report	Kossel 23', 55'

Umpires:
Kevin Roberts (WAL)
Bernhard Hajos (AUT)

13 July 2023
15:30

Germany	6–0	Ireland
Cofalla 15', 17'; Berendts 33'; Hasbach 38'; Kossel 54'; Warweg 58'	Report

Umpires:
Pauline Cuypers (BEL)
Daniël van der Nat (NED)

13 July 2023
15:45

Austria	0–2	Belgium
	Report	Hawaux 2', 50'

Umpires:
Ana Ortega (ESP)
Lewis White (SCO)

=== Pool B ===
Pos	Team	Pld	W	D	L	GF	GA	GD	Pts	Qualification or relegation
1	Spain	3	2	1	0	10	2	+8	7	Qualification for the semi-finals
2	Netherlands	3	2	0	1	11	6	+5	6	Qualification for the semi-finals
3	England	3	1	1	1	13	6	+7	4	
4	Poland (R)	3	0	0	3	0	20	−20	0	Relegation to the U18 Championship II

Source: EHF
Rules for classification: 1) points; 2) matches won; 3) goal difference; 4) goals for; 5) head-to-head result; 6) field goals for.
(R) Relegated

10 July 2023
11:15

Spain	2–2	England
Medina 47'; Rodriguez 58'	Report	Webb 22'; Dibiase 53'

Umpires:
Lorijn de Kraker (NED)
Lewis White (SCO)

10 July 2023
13:15

Netherlands	7–0	Poland
Tolboom 4', 9' van den Boezem 21' van der Weijden 35' van Hout 52'; Spanjaart 53' van 't Land 59'	Report

Umpires:
Alexandra Pollex (GER)
Amar Chudasama (ENG)

11 July 2023
15:30

Spain	3–0	Netherlands
Mustaros 19'; Elies 42', 59'	Report

Umpires:
Calre Barwood (WAL)
Lucien van der Borght (BEL)

11 July 2023
17:45

Poland	0–8	England
	Report	Dibiase 8', 51'; Eldridge 15'; Dowds 18', 30'; Webb 33'; Sturch-Hibbitt 40'; Javaid 53'

Umpires:
Gary O'Connor (IRL)
Miriam Gerö (AUT)

13 July 2023
11:00

Poland	0–5	Spain
	Report	Hernandez 37'; Elies 39'; De Elias 54'; Mustaros 56'; Martin 58'

Umpires:
Zoe Hall (ENG)
Gary O'Connor (IRL)

13 July 2023
11:15

Netherlands	4–3	England
van den Boezem 32' van Hout 51'; Spanjaart 54' van der Weijden 60'	Report	Dowds 17', 49'; Eldridge 21'

Umpires:
Raphaël Adrien (GER)
Francesc Tormo (ESP)

== Fifth to ninth place classification ==
=== Bracket ===
Cross-over
15 July
Ireland	6
Poland	1

Seventh place
16 July
Austria	1
Ireland	2

=== Cross-over ===
15 July 2023
10:00

Ireland	6–1	Poland
Olden 22', 43'; Mckee 28', 32', 52'; Dale 59'	Report	Witczak 47'

Umpires:
Bernhard Hajos (AUT)
Kevin Roberts (WAL)

=== Seventh and eighth place ===
16 July 2023
09:00

Austria	1–2	Ireland
Fink 13'	Report	Caulwell 4'; Pasley 14'

Umpires:
Zoe Hall (ENG)
Lewis White (SCO)

=== Fifth and sixth place ===
16 July 2023
11:15

Scotland	2–2	England
Edwards 1'; Webb 12'	Report	Hunt 42'; Bradley 60'
Penalties
Hunt (penalty shoot-out missed); Wilson (penalty shoot-out missed); Green (penalty shoot-out scored); Lobb (penalty shoot-out missed); Adams (penalty shoot-out missed)	1–2	(penalty shoot-out scored) Gladman; (penalty shoot-out scored) Dowds; (penalty shoot-out missed) Neave; (penalty shoot-out missed) Stone

Umpires:
Bernhard Hajos (AUT)
Pauline Cuypers (BEL)

== First to fourth place classification ==
=== Bracket ===
Semi-finals
15 July
Belgium (p.s.o.)	2 (3)
Netherlands	2 (2)
15 July
Spain	6
Germany	8

Final
14 July
Belgium	2
Germany	3
Third place
14 July
Netherlands	4
Spain	3

=== Semi-finals ===
15 July 2023
09:30

Belgium	2–2	Netherlands
Langendries 41', 50'	Report	van Hout 22', 48'
Penalties
Langendries (penalty shoot-out missed); Kinnen (penalty shoot-out scored); Hawaux (penalty shoot-out missed); Balthazar (penalty shoot-out missed); Molenaar (penalty shoot-out scored); Molenaar (penalty shoot-out scored)	3–2	(penalty shoot-out missed) Veen; (penalty shoot-out missed) Visscher; (penalty shoot-out scored) van Hout; (penalty shoot-out missed) Knapper; (penalty shoot-out scored) van 't Land; (penalty shoot-out missed) van 't Land

Umpires:
Raphaël Adrien (GER)
Lewis White (SCO)

15 July 2023
10:00

Spain	6–8	Germany
Medina 1', 52'; Moran 44'; Elies 49', 59'; Gesti Soler 55'	Report	Warweg 15', 52'; Muhle 17', 43'; Hansen 24' von Gersum 33'; Geyer 47'; Hasbach 58'

Umpires:
Lucien van der Borght (BEL)
Daniël van der Nat (NED)

=== Third place game ===
16 July 2023
10:00

Netherlands	4–3	Spain
Veen 1' van 't Land 34', 45'; Jozefzoon 47'	Report	Martin 8'; Hernandez 21'; Duran 43'

Umpires:
Gary O'Connor (IRL)
Amar Chudasama (ENG)

=== Final ===
16 July 2023
14:30

Belgium	2–3	Germany
Langendries 22'; Fauchey 58'	Report	Kossel 16'; Hasbach 41'; Wex 53'

Umpires:
Clare Barwood (WAL)
Kevin Roberts (WAL)

== Statistics ==
=== Final standings ===
Pos	Team	Relegation
1st place, gold medalist(s)	Germany (C, H)	
2nd place, silver medalist(s)	Belgium	
3rd place, bronze medalist(s)	Netherlands	
4	Spain	
5	England	
6	Scotland	
7	Ireland (R)	EuroHockey U18 Championship II
8	Austria (R)	EuroHockey U18 Championship II
9	Poland (R)	EuroHockey U18 Championship II

Source: EHF
(C) Champion; (H) Host; (R) Relegated

=== Goalscorers ===
There were 134 goals scored in 123 matches, for an average of 1.09 goals per match.

8 goals

- (Belgium) Charlie Langendries
- (Germany) Ben Hasbach

7 goals

- (Germany) Lukas Kossel

5 goals

- (Spain) Ernest Elies

4 goals

- (Belgium) Larry Fauchey
- (England) Sammy Dowds
- (Germany) Justus Warweg
- (Republic of Ireland) Matthew Mckee
- (Netherlands) Jacky van Hout

3 goals

- (Belgium) Lucas Balthazar
- (Belgium) Guerlain Hawaux
- (England) Will Dibiase
- (England) Jack Henry Webb
- (Germany) George Muhle
- (Republic of Ireland) James Evans
- (Netherlands) Jan van 't Land
- (Spain) Andrés Medina

2 goals

- (Austria) Benedikt Meisel
- (Belgium) Jean Cloetens
- (Belgium) Marin van Heel
- (England) Mikey Eldridge
- (Germany) Morten Berendts
- (Germany) Jonas Cofalla
- (Germany) Jonas von Gersum
- (Republic of Ireland) Robert Olden
- (Netherlands) Guus van der Boezem
- (Netherlands) Rein Spanjaart
- (Netherlands) Joost Tolboom
- (Netherlands) Sam van der Weijden
- (Spain) Javier Hernandez
- (Spain) Josep Martin
- (Spain) Nicolau Mustaros

1 goal

- (Austria) Adrian Fink
- (Austria) Theodor Morawec
- (Austria) Erik Schiesser
- (Belgium) Antoine Callewaert
- (Belgium) Nathan Leeuw
- (Belgium) Hugues Molenaar
- (England) Taheem Javaid
- (England) Jonny Sturch-Hibbitt
- (England) Sam Hunt
- (Germany) Benedikt Geyer
- (Germany) Nicolaus Hansen
- (Germany) Vincent Scholz
- (Germany) Tom Stahl
- (Germany) Titus Wex
- (Republic of Ireland) Max Caulwell
- (Republic of Ireland) Samuel Dale
- (Republic of Ireland) Ben Pasley
- (Netherlands) Isaac Jozefzoon
- (Netherlands) Peppe Veen
- (Poland) Emil Witczak
- (Scotland) Johnny Bradley
- (Scotland) Jake Edwards
- (Scotland) Murray Griffiths
- (Scotland) Andrew Lobb
- (Scotland) Alexander Marsland
- (Scotland) Jack Alexander Webb
- (Scotland) Olivier Wilson
- (Spain) Alex Duran
- (Spain) Lucas De Elias
- (Spain) Pau Gesti Soler
- (Spain) Ton Moran
- (Spain) David Rodriguez

Source: EHF
