= Lucas Veen =

Dutch field hockey player (born 2003)

Personal information
- Born: 23 November 2003 (age 22) Zeist, Netherlands

Sport
- Sport: Field hockey
- Position: Midfielder
- Club: Bloemendaal
Youth career
- Years: Team
- –2021: Schaerweijde
Senior career
Years	Team	Caps	Goals
2021–2024	HGC	-	-
2024–present	Bloemendaal	-	-
National team
Years	Team	Caps	Goals
2023–2024	Netherlands U21	11	(1)
2024–present	Netherlands	10	(1)
Medal record
Men's field hockey
Representing Netherlands
EuroHockey U21 Championship
Silver medal – second place	2024 Terrassa
EuroHockey U18 Championship
Silver medal – second place	2021 Valencia

Lucas Veen (born 23 November 2003) is a Dutch field hockey player who plays as a midfielder for Hoofdklasse club Bloemendaal and the Netherlands national team.

== Personal life ==
Lucas Veen was born and raised in Zeist, Netherlands. He comes from a hockey playing family, with his mother and father, Suzan and Stephan all playing international field hockey for the Netherlands.

He is sponsored by Ritual Hockey.

== Club career ==
Veen spent his entire youth career at Schaerweijde. In 2021, he switched to HGC and started playing in the Hoofdklasse. After three years, when HGC was relegated from the Hoofdklasse, he moved to Bloemendaal.

== International career ==
=== Under–21 ===
Veen made his international debut at under–21 level. He made his first appearances for the Netherlands U–21 team in 2023, at the FIH Junior World Cup in Kuala Lumpur. During the tournament he scored once, helping the team to a fifth-place finish.

In 2024 he won his first and only medal with the squad, taking home silver at the EuroHockey U–21 Championship in Terrassa.

=== Oranje ===
Veen received his first call–up to the Oranje in 2024. He earned his first senior international cap during a match against Belgium in Amsterdam, during the sixth season of the FIH Pro League.
