= Matteo Poljaric =

German field hockey player (born 2002)

Personal information
- Born: 11 February 2002 (age 24) Berlin, Germany

Sport
- Sport: Field hockey
- Position: Midfield
Senior career
Years	Team	Caps	Goals
–2024	Berliner HC	-	-
2024–	Mannheimer HC	-	-
National team
Years	Team	Caps	Goals
2021–2023	Germany U–21	26	(5)
2024–	Germany	25	(4)
Medal record
Men's field hockey
Representing Germany
FIH Junior World Cup
Gold medal – first place	2023 Kuala Lumpur	Team
Silver medal – second place	2021 Bhubaneswar	Team
EuroHockey U–21 Championship
Silver medal – second place	2022 Ghent	Team
Sultan of Johor Cup
Gold medal – first place	2023 Johor Bahru	Team
EuroHockey U–18 Championship
Gold medal – first place	2021 Valencia	Team

Matteo Poljaric (born 11 February 2002) is a field hockey player from Germany.

== Personal life ==
Matteo Poljaric was born on 11 February 2002, in Berlin, Germany.

== Career ==
=== Domestic league ===
In the German national league, the Bundesliga, Poljaric represents Mannheimer HC. He also previously represented Berliner HC.

=== Under–21 ===
Poljaric made his debut for the German U–21 side in 2021. He was a member of the silver medal-winning squad at the FIH Junior World Cup in Bhubaneswar.

He won his second medal with the national junior team in 2022, taking home silver at the EuroHockey U–21 Championship in Ghent.

At the beginning of the 2023 season, he was appointed as captain of then national junior team. He made his first appearances of the year during a Four–Nations Tournament in Düsseldorf. He then led the team to a gold medal at the Sultan of Johor Cup in Johor Bahru. He concluded his junior career at the FIH Junior World Cup in Kuala Lumpur, where he led the team to another gold medal for the year.

=== Honamas ===
Following his junior international debut, Poljaric received his first call–up to the Honamas in 2023. He earned his first senior international cap during a match against Spain in Antwerp, during the fourth season of the FIH Pro League.

Since his debut, Poljaric has appeared in a test series against India in New Delhi, and the sixth season of the FIH Pro League.
