= Hugo von Montgelas =

German field hockey player (born 2004)

Personal information
- Full name: Hugo Maximilian Maria von Montgelas
- Born: 17 April 2004 (age 22) Frankfurt, Germany

Sport
- Sport: Field hockey
- Position: Midfield
Senior career
| Years | Team | Caps | Goals |
| –2022 | SC 1880 Frankfurt | - | - |
| 2022– | Mannheimer HC | - | - |
National team
| Years | Team | Caps | Goals |
| 2022– | Germany | 13 | (0) |
| 2022– | Germany U–21 | 25 | (4) |
Medal record
Men's field hockey
Representing Germany
World Cup
| Gold medal – first place | 2026 Wavre/Amstelveen |
FIH Junior World Cup
| Gold medal – first place | 2023 Kuala Lumpur |
EuroHockey U–21 Championship
| Silver medal – second place | 2022 Ghent |
Sultan of Johor Cup
| Gold medal – first place | 2023 Johor Bahru |
EuroHockey U–18 Championship
| Gold medal – first place | 2021 Valencia |

Hugo Maximilian Maria von Montgelas (born 17 April 2004) is a field hockey player from Germany.

== Personal life ==
Hugo von Montgelas was born on 17 April 2004, in Frankfurt, Germany.

He is a student at the University of Mannheim.

== Career ==
=== Domestic league ===
In the German national league, the Bundesliga, von Montgelas represents Mannheimer HC. He also previously represented SC 1880 Frankfurt.

=== Under–21 ===
Von Montgelas made his debut for the German U–21 side in 2022. He made his first appearances for the national junior team at the EuroHockey U–21 Championship in Ghent, where he won a silver medal.

He continued to represent the national junior squad in throughout 2023. He made his first appearances during a Four–Nations Tournament in Düsseldorf. He then went on to held the team secure a gold medal at the Sultan of Johor Cup in Johor Bahru. He concluded his junior career at the FIH Junior World Cup in Kuala Lumpur, where he won a gold medal.

In 2024 he competed at the EuroHockey U21 Championship in Terrassa.

=== Honamas ===
Prior to making his junior international debut, von Montgelas received his first call–up to the Honamas in 2022. He earned his first senior international cap during a match against India in Bhubaneswar, during the third season of the FIH Pro League.

Since his debut, von Montgelas has appeared in the fourth, fifth and sixth seasons of the FIH Pro League.
