= Ben Hasbach =

German field hockey player (born 2005)

Personal information
- Born: 22 June 2005 (age 21) Bremen, Germany

Sport
- Sport: Field hockey
- Position: Forward
- Club: Mannheimer HC
National team
Years	Team	Caps	Goals
2023–	Germany U–21	19	(19)
2024–	Germany	2	(0)
2025–	Germany Indoor	6	(16)
Medal record
Men's field hockey
Representing Germany
FIH Junior World Cup
Gold medal – first place	2023 Kuala Lumpur	Team
Gold medal – first place	2025 Tamil Nadu	Team
Sultan of Johor Cup
Gold medal – first place	2023 Johor Bahru	Team
EuroHockey U–18 Championship
Gold medal – first place	2023 Krefeld	Team
Men's indoor hockey
FIH Indoor World Cup
Gold medal – first place	2025 Poreč	Team

Ben Hasbach (born 22 June 2005) is a field and indoor hockey player from Germany.

== Personal life ==
Ben Hasbach was born and raised in Bremen, Germany.

He is a student at the University of Mannheim.

== Field hockey ==
=== Domestic league ===
In the German national league, the Bundesliga, Hasbach represents Mannheimer HC. He has also previously represented Harvestehuder THC.

=== Under–18 ===
Hasbach debuted on the international scene at under–18 level. He made his debut for the national U–18 side at the 2023 EuroHockey U–18 Championship in Krefeld. At the tournament, he finished as highest goalscorer and won a gold medal.

=== Under–21 ===
The month after making his under–18 debut, Hasbach was included in the German U–21 side for the first time in 2023. He made his first appearances for the team during a Four–Nations Tournament in Düsseldorf. He then went on to held the team secure a gold medals at both the Sultan of Johor Cup in Johor Bahru, and the FIH Junior World Cup in Kuala Lumpur.

In 2024 he competed at the EuroHockey U–21 Championship in Terrassa.

=== Honamas ===
Hasbach made his senior international debut in 2024, during a test series against India in New Delhi.

== Indoor hockey ==
In addition to field hockey, Hasbach also represent the German Indoor team in international competitions. He made his debut for the side at the 2025 FIH Indoor World Cup in Poreč, where he won a gold medal. At the conclusion of the tournament, he was awarded as the best young player.
