= Bruno Ávila =

Spanish field hockey player (born 2004)

Personal information
- Full name: Bruno Ávila Gran
- Born: 21 January 2004 (age 22) Terrassa, Spain

Sport
- Sport: Field hockey
- Position: Defence
- Club: Club Ègara
National team
Years	Team	Caps	Goals
2024–	Spain U–21	5	(5)
2025–	Spain	6	(1)
Medal record
Men's field hockey
Representing Spain
FIH Junior World Cup
Silver medal – second place	2025 Tamil Nadu	Team
EuroHockey U–21 Championship
Gold medal – first place	2024 Terrassa

Bruno Ávila Gran (born 17 September 2004) is a field hockey player from Spain.

== Personal life ==
Bruno Ávila was born and raised in Terrassa, Spain.

== Field hockey ==
=== Domestic league ===
In the Spanish national league, the Liga Iberdrola, Ávila represents Club Ègara.

=== Under–21 ===
Ávila made his debut for the Spanish U–21 side in 2024. He made his first appearances during the EuroHockey U–21 Championship. The tournament was played in Ávila's hometown, Terrassa, with the team clinching a gold medal.

=== Red Sticks ===
Following his junior debut in 2024, Ávila received his first call up to the senior national squad. He made his senior international debut for the Red Sticks during the sixth season of the FIH Pro League. His first appearance came during a match against the Netherlands in Sydney.

== International goals ==
The following is a list of goals scored by Ávila at international level.

Goal	Date	Location	Opponent	Score	Result	Competition	Ref.
1	15 February 2025	Kalinga Stadium, Bhubaneswar, India	India	3–1	3–1	2024–25 FIH Pro League	
