= Pepijn van der Heijden =

Dutch field hockey player (born 2003)

Personal information
- Full name: Pepijn Hubobé van der Heijden
- Born: 22 April 2003 (age 23) Rotterdam, Netherlands

Sport
- Sport: Field hockey
- Position: Defence
- Club: HC Rotterdam
National team
| Years | Team | Caps | Goals |
| 2022–2024 | Netherlands U–21 | 16 | (3) |
| 2024– | Netherlands | 6 | (3) |
Medal record
Men's field hockey
Representing Netherlands
EuroHockey U21 Championship
| Gold medal – first place | 2022 Ghent |
| Silver medal – second place | 2024 Terrassa |

Pepijn Hubobé van der Heijden (born 22 April 2003) is a Dutch field hockey player.

== Personal life ==
Pepijn van der Heijden was born and raised in Rotterdam, Netherlands.

== Field hockey ==
=== Domestic league ===
In the Dutch national league, the Hoofdklasse, Van der Heijden represents HC Rotterdam.

=== Under–21 ===
Van der Heijden made his debut for the Dutch U–21 side in 2022. He made his first appearances during the EuroHockey U–21 Championship in Ghent, where he won a gold medal.

He continued to represent the national junior squad until 2024, during which he competed at two major tournaments. The first was the 2023 FIH Junior World Cup in Kuala Lumpur, followed by the 2024 EuroHockey U–21 Championship in Terrassa, winning a silver medal at the latter.

=== Oranje ===
Van der Heijden made his senior international debut for Oranje during the sixth season of the FIH Pro League. His earned his first cap during a match against Belgium in Amsterdam.

== International goals ==
The following is a list of goals scored by Van der Heijden at international level.

| Goal | Date | Location | Opponent | Score | Result | Competition | Ref. |
|---|---|---|---|---|---|---|---|
| 1 | 7 February 2025 | Sydney Olympic Park, Sydney, Australia | Spain | 1–0 | 2–1 | 2024–25 FIH Pro League | |
| 2 | 9 February 2025 | Sydney Olympic Park, Sydney, Australia | Australia | 2–4 | 4–4 | 2024–25 FIH Pro League | |
| 3 | 9 February 2025 | Sydney Olympic Park, Sydney, Australia | Australia | 4–4 | 4–4 | 2024–25 FIH Pro League | |
