= 2024 Men's EuroHockey U21 Championship =

Hockey tournament

Tournament details
- Host country: Spain
- City: Terrassa
- Dates: 14–20 July
- Teams: 8 (from 1 confederation)
- Venue: Can Salas

Final positions
- Champions: Spain (4th title)
- Runner-up: Netherlands
- Third place: Belgium

Tournament statistics
- Matches played: 20
- Goals scored: 138 (6.9 per match)
- Top scorer: (Germany) Ben Hasbach (11 goals)
- Best player: (Germany) Jakob Brilla
- Best goalkeeper: (Spain) Jan Capellades

The 2024 Men's EuroHockey U21 Championship was the 21st edition of the Men's EuroHockey U21 Championship, the biennial international men's under-21 field hockey championship of Europe organised by the European Hockey Federation.

It was hosted by Atlètic Terrassa Hockey Club at Can Salas in Terrassa, Spain alongside the women's tournament from 14 to 20 July 2024. The top six teams qualified for the 2025 Men's FIH Hockey Junior World Cup.

The Netherlands were the defending champions, winning their tenth title by defeating the defending champions Germany 3–1 in the 2022 final. They could not keep their title this time as the hosts Spain defeated the Netherlands 3–1 in final to win their fourth title. Belgium won the bronze medal by defeating Germany 4–3.

== Qualified teams ==
Participating nations qualified based on their final ranking from the 2022 competition.

| Dates | Event | Location | Quotas | Qualifier(s) |
|---|---|---|---|---|
| 24–30 July 2022 | 2022 EuroHockey Junior Championship | Ghent, Belgium | 6 | Belgium; England; France; Germany; Netherlands; Spain |
| 24–30 July 2022 | 2022 EuroHockey Junior Championship II | Plzeň, Czech Republic | 2 | Ireland; Turkey |
| Total | | | 8 | |

== Preliminary round ==
=== Pool A ===
| Pos | Team | Pld | W | D | L | GF | GA | GD | Pts | Qualification |
|---|---|---|---|---|---|---|---|---|---|---|
| 1 | Belgium | 3 | 2 | 1 | 0 | 14 | 6 | +8 | 7 | Semi-finals and 2025 Junior World Cup |
| 2 | Germany | 3 | 1 | 2 | 0 | 22 | 8 | +14 | 5 | Semi-finals and 2025 Junior World Cup |
| 3 | France | 3 | 1 | 1 | 1 | 19 | 8 | +11 | 4 | |
| 4 | Turkey | 3 | 0 | 0 | 3 | 3 | 36 | −33 | 0 | |

Source: FIH
Rules for classification: 1) points; 2) matches won; 3) goal difference; 4) goals for; 5) head-to-head result; 6) field goals for.

14 July 2024
09:45

| France | 13–1 | Turkey |
|---|---|---|
| Tchakonte 9', 11'; Segretain 21'; Saint-Martin 21', 43', 50'; Michaelis 33'; Piole 36', 50', 57'; Liddiard 37'; Gaillard 45', 60' | Report | Taşar 18' |

Umpires:
Manouk Bakker (NED)
Marius Cuadrat (ESP)

14 July 2024
12:15

| Germany | 3–3 | Belgium |
|---|---|---|
| Hasbach 6'; Brilla 7', 59' | Report | Labouchere 26'; Balthazar 43'; Rogge 55' |

Umpires:
Alex Fedenczuk (SCO)
Ana Ortega (ESP)

15 July 2024
10:00

| Belgium | 8–1 | Turkey |
|---|---|---|
| Labouchere 7', 39'; Cloetens 9', 34'; Malherbe 15', 52'; Vanderkeilen 23'; Crols 56' | Report | O. Polat 10' |

Umpires:
Berry van Bentum (NED)
Ellie Duffy (IRL)

15 July 2024
12:15

| France | 4–4 | Germany |
|---|---|---|
| Gaillard 11'; Saint-Martin 32'; Liddiard 39'; Brodt 60' | Report | Hasbach 8', 16', 29'; Lindemann 15' |

Umpires:
Mahmut Çilkiz (TUR)
Manouk Bakker (NED)

17 July 2024
09:45

| Germany | 15–1 | Turkey |
|---|---|---|
| Hasbach 8', 21', 27', 40', 46'; Brilla 17', 32'; Seitz 24', 30', 57'; Holdermann 36', 38'; Lindemann 43'; Von Montgelas 45'; Geyer 51' | Report | Aydin 35' |

Umpires:
Amar Chudasama (ENG)
Berry van Bentum (NED)

17 July 2024
10:00

| Belgium | 3–2 | France |
|---|---|---|
| Labouchere 15', 21', 49' | Report | Saint-Martin 28', 47' |

Umpires:
Zoe Hall (ENG)
Ole Ingwersen (GER)

=== Pool B ===
| Pos | Team | Pld | W | D | L | GF | GA | GD | Pts | Qualification |
|---|---|---|---|---|---|---|---|---|---|---|
| 1 | Netherlands | 3 | 2 | 1 | 0 | 10 | 6 | +4 | 7 | Semi-finals and 2025 Junior World Cup |
| 2 | Spain (H) | 3 | 0 | 3 | 0 | 9 | 9 | 0 | 3 | Semi-finals and 2025 Junior World Cup |
| 3 | England | 3 | 0 | 2 | 1 | 6 | 7 | −1 | 2 | |
| 4 | Ireland | 3 | 0 | 2 | 1 | 5 | 8 | −3 | 2 | |

Source: FIH
Rules for classification: 1) points; 2) matches won; 3) goal difference; 4) goals for; 5) head-to-head result; 6) field goals for.
(H) Hosts

14 July 2024
17:45

| Netherlands | 3–2 | England |
|---|---|---|
| Van der Veen 24'; Trieling 28'; Boers 52' | Report | Penrose 30'; Stone 37' |

Umpires:
Russell Donaldson (IRL)
Ole Ingwersen (GER)

14 July 2024
20:15

| Spain | 3–3 | Ireland |
|---|---|---|
| Serrahima 16', 48'; Ávila 24' | Report | Cunningham 21'; A. McKee 23', 55' |

Umpires:
Clare Barwood (WAL)
Anatole Platel (FRA)

16 July 2024
17:00

| England | 1–1 | Ireland |
|---|---|---|
| Penrose 41' | Report | A. McKee 50' |

Umpires:
Michal Pivko (SVK)
Tommy Croese (BEL)

16 July 2024
19:15

| Spain | 3–3 | Netherlands |
|---|---|---|
| Amat 43', 45'; Ávila 56' | Report | Van der Veen 2'; Boers 19'; Trieling 21' |

Umpires:
Teresa Lipsky (GER)
Alex Fedenczuk (SCO)

17 July 2024
17:45

| Netherlands | 4–1 | Ireland |
|---|---|---|
| Boers 1'; Van Bijnen 6'; Bukkens 42'; Lucieer 46' | Report | Collins 38' |

Umpires:
Marius Cuadrat (ESP)
Mahmut Çilkiz (TUR)

17 July 2024
18:00

| England | 3–3 | Spain |
|---|---|---|
| Sturch-Hibbitt 35'; Wilcher 38'; Hughson 57' | Report | Cabré-Verdiell 1'; Espino 6'; Álvarez 42' |

Umpires:
Clare Barwood (WAL)
Thalia Bellemans (BEL)

== Fifth to eighth place classification ==
The points obtained in the preliminary round against the other team are taken over.

=== Pool C ===
| Pos | Team | Pld | W | D | L | GF | GA | GD | Pts | Qualification or relegation |
|---|---|---|---|---|---|---|---|---|---|---|
| 5 | England | 3 | 2 | 1 | 0 | 14 | 3 | +11 | 7 | Qualification for the 2025 Junior World Cup |
| 6 | France | 3 | 2 | 0 | 1 | 19 | 6 | +13 | 6 | Qualification for the 2025 Junior World Cup |
| 7 | Ireland (R) | 3 | 1 | 1 | 1 | 8 | 8 | 0 | 4 | Relegation to the U21 Championship II |
| 8 | Turkey (R) | 3 | 0 | 0 | 3 | 4 | 28 | −24 | 0 | Relegation to the U21 Championship II |

Source: FIH
Rules for classification: 1) points; 2) matches won; 3) goal difference; 4) goals for; 5) head-to-head result; 6) field goals for.
(R) Relegated

19 July 2024
16:30

| France | 2–4 | England |
|---|---|---|
| Michaelis 42'; Verrier 60' | Report | Markham 10', 52'; Penrose 39'; Wilcher 45' |

Umpires:
Clare Barwood (WAL)
Berry van Bentum (NED)

19 July 2024
18:45

| Turkey | 3–6 | Ireland |
|---|---|---|
| Aydin 24', 50'; Alperen 53' | Report | Clark 14', 31'; Rowe 26'; Cunningham 45+', 58'; A. Mckee 60+' |

Umpires:
Tommy Croese (BEL)
Anatole Platel (FRA)

20 July 2024
15:45

| France | 4–1 | Ireland |
|---|---|---|
| Verrier 38'; Saint-Martin 45'; Plauche 51'; Gaillard 60' | Report | M. Mckee 40' |

Umpires:
Manouk Bakker (NED)
Berry van Bentum (NED)

20 July 2024
18:00

| England | 9–0 | Turkey |
|---|---|---|
| Penrose 7', 59'; Markham 15', 15', 23', 35'; Graves 24'; Wilcher 25'; Rose 44' | Report |

Umpires:
Michal Pivko (SVK)
Thalia Bellemans (BEL)

== First to fourth place classification ==
=== Bracket ===
Semi-finals
19 July
Belgium | 2
Spain | 3
19 July
Netherlands | 3
Germany | 2

Final
20 July
Spain | 3
Netherlands | 1
Third place
20 July
Belgium | 4
Germany | 3

=== Semi-finals ===
19 July 2024
16:45

| Belgium | 2–3 | Spain |
|---|---|---|
| Decruyenaere 23'; Labouchere 59' | Report | Cabré-Verdiell 10'; Ávila 24', 58' |

Umpires:
Manouk Bakker (NED)
Ole Ingwersen (GER)

19 July 2024
19:00

| Netherlands | 3–2 | Germany |
|---|---|---|
| Van der Heijden 36'; Boers 42', 59' | Report | Hasbach 34'; Glander 45' |

Umpires:
Alex Fedenczuk (SCO)
Zoe Hall (ENG)

=== Third place match ===
20 July 2024
15:30

| Belgium | 4–3 | Germany |
|---|---|---|
| Balthazar 24'; Labouchere 35'; Malherbe 40'; Bogaerts 60' | Report | Hinrichs 5'; Hasbach 10'; Glander 31' |

Umpires:
Ana Ortega (ESP)
Marius Cuadrat (ESP)

=== Final ===
20 July 2024
20:00

| Spain | 3–1 | Netherlands |
|---|---|---|
| Ávila 29'; Amat 38'; Álvarez 53' | Report | Van der Heijden 4' |

Umpires:
Ole Ingwersen (GER)
Alex Fedenczuk (SCO)

== Statistics ==
=== Final standings ===
| Pos | Team | Qualification or relegation |
|---|---|---|
| 1st place, gold medalist(s) | Spain (H) | Qualification for the 2025 Junior World Cup |
| 2nd place, silver medalist(s) | Netherlands | Qualification for the 2025 Junior World Cup |
| 3rd place, bronze medalist(s) | Belgium | Qualification for the 2025 Junior World Cup |
| 4 | Germany | Qualification for the 2025 Junior World Cup |
| 5 | England | Qualification for the 2025 Junior World Cup |
| 6 | France | Qualification for the 2025 Junior World Cup |
| 7 | Ireland (R) | Relegation to the U21 Championship II |
| 8 | Turkey (R) | Relegation to the U21 Championship II |

Source: FIH
(H) Host; (R) Relegated

=== Goalscorers ===
There were 138 goals scored in 20 matches, for an average of 6.9 goals per match.

11 goals

- (Germany) Ben Hasbach

8 goals

- (Belgium) Hugo Labouchere

7 goals

- (France) Victor Saint-Martin

6 goals

- (England) Henry Markham

5 goals

- (England) Rory Penrose
- (Netherlands) Timo Boers
- (Spain) Bruno Ávila

4 goals

- (France) Tom Gaillard
- (Germany) Jakob Brilla
- (Ireland) Adam McKee

3 goals

- (Belgium) Samuel Malherbe
- (England) Lewis Wilcher
- (France) Gabriel Piole
- (Germany) Fabio Seitz
- (Ireland) John Cunningham
- (Spain) Pere Amat
- (Turkey) Mehmet Aydin

2 goals

- (Belgium) Lucas Balthazar
- (Belgium) Jean Cloetens
- (France) James Liddiard
- (France) Aristide Michaelis
- (France) Nathan Tchakonte
- (France) Hugo Verrier
- (Germany) Paul Glander
- (Germany) Liam Holdermann
- (Germany) Leon Lindemann
- (Ireland) James Clark
- (Netherlands) Danilo Trieling
- (Netherlands) Pepijn van der Heijden
- (Netherlands) Casper van der Veen
- (Spain) Nicolás Álvarez
- (Spain) Pol Cabré-Verdiell
- (Spain) Anton Serrahima

1 goal

- (Belgium) Nicolas Bogaerts
- (Belgium) Thomas Crols
- (Belgium) Jules Decruyenaere
- (Belgium) Nathan Rogge
- (Belgium) Oliver Vanderkeilen
- (England) Ted Graves
- (England) Matthew Hughson
- (England) Patrick Rose
- (England) Harrison Stone
- (England) Jonny Sturch-Hibbitt
- (France) Erwan Brodt
- (France) Arthur Plauche
- (France) Paul Segretain
- (Germany) Benedikt Geyer
- (Germany) Peer Henrichs
- (Germany) Hugo von Montgelas
- (Ireland) Mark Collins
- (Ireland) Matthew McKee
- (Ireland) Louis Rowe
- (Netherlands) Finn van Bijnen
- (Netherlands) Miles Bukkens
- (Netherlands) Dylan Lucieer
- (Spain) Pablo Espino
- (Turkey) Ataş Alperen
- (Turkey) Orhan Polat
- (Turkey) Hakim Taşar

Source: FIH

== See also ==
- 2024 Men's EuroHockey U21 Championship II
