= Duco Telgenkamp =

Dutch field hockey player

Personal information
- Full name: Duco Valentijn Telgenkamp
- Born: 17 July 2002 (age 24) The Hague, Netherlands

Sport
- Sport: Field hockey
- Position: Forward
- Club: Amsterdam
Youth career
- Years: Team
- 2008–2014: HGC
- 2014–2020: HDM
Senior career
Years	Team	Caps	Goals
2020–2022	HDM	-	-
2022–2026	Kampong	-	-
2026–present	Amsterdam	-	-
National team
Years	Team	Caps	Goals
2022–2023	Netherlands U21	6	(4)
2023–present	Netherlands	35	(23)
Medal record
Men's field hockey
Representing Netherlands
Olympic Games
Gold medal – first place	2024 Paris	Team
EuroHockey Championship
Gold medal – first place	2023 Mönchengladbach
EuroHockey Junior Championship
Gold medal – first place	2022 Ghent

Duco Valentijn Telgenkamp (born 17 July 2002) is a Dutch field hockey player who plays as a forward for Hoofdklasse club Amsterdam and the Netherlands national team.

== Club career ==
Telgenkamp started playing hockey aged six at HGC, when he was 12 years old, he switched to HDM. After two years in the Promotieklasse with HDM, he moved to Kampong in 2022. He scored two goals in his debut for Kampong. In January 2026 it was announced he would join Amsterdam from the 2026–27 season onwards.

== International career ==
=== Under–21 ===
Telgenkamp made his international debut for the Netherlands at under–21 level. He was a member of the gold medal-winning team at the 2022 EuroHockey Junior Championship in Ghent.

In 2023, Telgenkamp was named in the squad for the FIH Junior World Cup in Kuala Lumpur.

=== Oranje ===
Following his junior debut, Telgenkamp was called up to make his senior international debut in 2023. He made his first appearance for the senior national team during season four of the FIH Pro League. He later represented the team again at the EuroHockey Championship in Mönchengladbach. At the tournament, he won a gold medal and was named Young Player of the Tournament.

== Controversy at the 2024 Summer Olympics ==
During the men's field hockey final at the 2024 Summer Olympics, Duco Telgenkamp became the center of a significant controversy following the Netherlands' victory over Germany. After a tense match that ended in a 1–1 draw, the Dutch team won 3–1 in a penalty shootout, with Telgenkamp scoring the decisive goal against German goalkeeper Jean-Paul Danneberg.

Following the goal Telgenkamp mocked Danneberg by making a shushing gesture, which sparked a physical altercation on the field. This incident drew widespread media attention and led to discussions about sportsmanship at the Olympic level.

== Honours ==
=== Club ===
Kampong

- Hoofdklasse: 2023–24
- Gold Cup: 2023–24
- Euro Hockey League: 2025–26

=== International ===
Netherlands U21

- EuroHockey Junior Championship: 2022

Netherlands

- Summer Olympics gold medal: 2024
- EuroHockey Championship: 2023
- FIH Pro League: 2022–23

=== Individual ===
- EuroHockey Championship leading goalscorer: 2023
- EuroHockey Championship young player of the tournament: 2023
