= Florian Sperling =

German field hockey player (born 2002)

Personal information
- Full name: Florian Otto Elvis Sperling
- Born: 24 August 2002 (age 23) Germany

Sport
- Sport: Field hockey
- Position: Forward
- Club: Uhlenhorster HC
National team
Years	Team	Caps	Goals
2022–	Germany	10	(4)
2022–2023	Germany U–21	19	(10)
Medal record
Men's field hockey
Representing Germany
FIH Junior World Cup
Gold medal – first place	2023 Kuala Lumpur	Team
EuroHockey U–21 Championship
Silver medal – second place	2022 Ghent	Team
Sultan of Johor Cup
Gold medal – first place	2023 Johor Bahru	Team
EuroHockey U–18 Championship
Gold medal – first place	2021 Valencia	Team

Florian Otto Elvis Sperling (born 24 August 2002) is a field hockey player from Germany.

== Career ==
=== Domestic league ===
In the German national league, the Bundesliga, Sperling represents Uhlenhorster HC. He also previously represented Berliner HC.

=== Under–21 ===
Sperling made his debut for the German U–21 side in 2022. He made his first appearances for the national junior team at the EuroHockey U–21 Championship in Ghent, where he won a silver medal.

He continued to represent the national junior squad in throughout 2023. He made his first appearances during a Four–Nations Tournament in Düsseldorf. He then went on to held the team secure a gold medal at the Sultan of Johor Cup in Johor Bahru. He concluded his junior career at the FIH Junior World Cup in Kuala Lumpur, where he won a gold medal.

=== Honamas ===
Prior to making his junior international debut, Sperling received his first call–up to the Honamas in 2022. He earned his first senior international cap during a match against India in Bhubaneswar, during the third season of the FIH Pro League.

Since his debut, Sperling has appeared in the fourth and sixth seasons of the FIH Pro League.

== International goals ==
The following is a list of goals scored by Sperling at international level.

Goal	Date	Location	Opponent	Score	Result	Competition	Ref.
1	2 July 2023	Wilrijkse Plein, Antwerp, Belgium	Spain	1–1	1–3	2022–23 FIH Pro League	
2	5 July 2023	Wilrijkse Plein, Antwerp, Belgium	Spain	2–1	3–4	2022–23 FIH Pro League	
3	2 December 2024	Wagener Stadium, Amsterdam, Netherlands	Belgium	2–4	3–4	2024–25 FIH Pro League	
4	18 February 2025	Kalinga Stadium, Bhubaneswar, India	India	1–0	4–1	2024–25 FIH Pro League	
