= Michel Struthoff =

German field hockey player (born 2002)

Personal information
- Born: 19 April 2003 (age 23) Germany

Sport
- Sport: Field hockey
- Position: Forward
- Club: Rot-Weiss Köln
National team
Years	Team	Caps	Goals
2021–2024	Germany U–21	26	(6)
2022–	Germany	25	(4)
2022–	Germany Indoor	6	(4)
Medal record
Men's field hockey
Representing Germany
World Cup
Gold medal – first place	2026 Wavre/Amstelveen
EuroHockey Championships
Gold medal – first place	2025 Mönchengladbach
FIH Junior World Cup
Gold medal – first place	2023 Kuala Lumpur
Silver medal – second place	2021 Bhubaneswar
Sultan of Johor Cup
Gold medal – first place	2023 Johor Bahru
EuroHockey U–18 Championship
Gold medal – first place	2021 Valencia
Men's indoor hockey
EuroHockey Indoor Championship
Silver medal – second place	2022 Hamburg

Michel Struthoff (born 19 April 2003) is a field and indoor hockey player from Germany.

== Field hockey ==
=== Domestic league ===
In the German national league, the Bundesliga, Struthoff represents Rot-Weiss Köln. He also previously represented Uhlenhorster HC.

=== Under–21 ===
Struthoff made his debut for the German U–21 side in 2021. He made his first and only appearances for the national junior team at the FIH Junior World Cup in Bhubaneswar. At the tournament, he won a silver medal.

He didn't represent the team again until 2023. His first appearances came during a Four–Nations Tournament in Düsseldorf. He finished out the year with gold medals at the Sultan of Johor Cup in Johor Bahru and the FIH Junior World Cup in Kuala Lumpur.

In 2024, he made his final appearances for the national junior team at the EuroHockey U–21 Championship held in Terrassa.

=== Honamas ===
Following his junior international debut, Struthoff received his first call–up to the Honamas in 2022. He earned his first senior international cap during a match against India in Bhubaneswar, during the third season of the FIH Pro League.

Since his debut, Struthoff has appeared in the fourth, fifth and sixth seasons of the FIH Pro League.

== International goals ==
The following is a list of field hockey goals scored by Struthoff at international level.

Goal	Date	Location	Opponent	Score	Result	Competition	Ref.
1	10 March 2023	Birsa Munda International Hockey Stadium, Rourkela, India	India	2–3	2–3	2022–23 FIH Pro League	
2	18 February 2025	Kalinga Stadium, Bhubaneswar, India	India	3–1	4–1	2024–25 FIH Pro League	
3	24 February 2025	Kalinga Stadium, Bhubaneswar, India	Ireland	2–0	8–2	2024–25 FIH Pro League	
4	24 February 2025	Kalinga Stadium, Bhubaneswar, India	Ireland	8–2	8–2	2024–25 FIH Pro League	

== Indoor hockey ==
In addition to field hockey, Struthoff has represented the German Indoor squad. He became European runner–up in 2022, taking home a silver medal from the EuroHockey Indoor Championship in Hamburg.
