= Casper van der Veen =

Dutch field hockey player (born 2004)

Personal information
- Born: 29 June 2004 (age 22) Heemstede, Netherlands

Sport
- Sport: Field hockey
- Position: Forward
- Club: HC Bloemendaal
National team
| Years | Team | Caps | Goals |
| 2021– | Netherlands U–21 | 22 | (12) |
| 2024– | Netherlands | 4 | (1) |
Medal record
Men's field hockey
Representing Netherlands
EuroHockey U–21 Championship
| Gold medal – first place | 2022 Ghent |
| Silver medal – second place | 2024 Terrassa |
EuroHockey U–18 Championship
| Silver medal – second place | 2021 Valencia |

Casper van der Veen (born 29 June 2004) is a field hockey player from the Netherlands.

== Personal life ==
Capser van der Veen was born and raised in Heemstede, Netherlands.

== Career ==
=== Domestic league ===
In the Dutch national league, the Hoofdklasse, van der Veen represents Bloemendaal.

=== Under–21 ===
Van der Veen made his international debut at under–21 level. He made his first appearances for the Netherlands U–21 team in 2021, at the FIH Junior World Cup in Bhubaneswar.

Since his debut, van der Veen has been a notable inclusion in the national junior team. During his junior career, he has medalled with the national team twice. He has won gold and silver medals at the 2022 and 2024 editions of the EuroHockey Junior Championship, respectively.

In 2023 he competed at his second FIH Junior World Cup, held in Kuala Lumpur.

=== Oranje ===
Van der Veen received his first call–up to the Oranje in 2024. He earned his first senior international cap during a match against Belgium in Amsterdam, during the sixth season of the FIH Pro League.

== International goals ==
The following is a list of goals scored by van der Veen at international level.

| Goal | Date | Location | Opponent | Score | Result | Competition | Ref. |
|---|---|---|---|---|---|---|---|
| 1 | 8 December 2024 | Wagener Stadium, Amsterdam, Netherlands | Belgium | 2–2 | 3–3 | 2024–25 FIH Pro League | |
