= Miles Bukkens =

Dutch field hockey player

Personal information
- Born: 15 February 2003 (age 23) Badhoevedorp, Netherlands

Sport
- Sport: Field hockey
- Position: Forward
Youth career
- Years: Team
- 2009–2012: Kikkers
- 2012–2014: Reigers
- 2014–2020: Pinoké
Senior career
Years	Team	Caps	Goals
2020–present	Pinoké	-	-
National team
Years	Team	Caps	Goals
2021–present	Netherlands U21	11	(23)
2023–present	Netherlands	11	(4)
Medal record
Men's field hockey
Representing Netherlands
EuroHockey U21 Championship
Gold medal – first place	2022 Ghent
Silver medal – second place	2024 Terrassa

Miles Bukkens (born 15 February 2003) is a Dutch field hockey player who plays as a forward for Hoofdklasse club Pinoké and the Dutch national team.

== Personal life ==
Miles Bukkens was born and raised in Badhoevedorp, Netherlands.

== Club career ==
In the Netherlands' domestic league, the Hoofdklasse, Bukkens represents Pinoké. Before he joined the youth ranks of Pinoké he played for the Kikkers and Reigers.

Bukkens currently holds Pinoké's all-time scoring record for their Heren 1, with 27. He achieved this in the 2024/25 season.

== International career ==
=== Under–21 ===
Miles Bukkens made his debut for the Netherlands under-21 team at the 2021 FIH Junior World Cup in Bhubaneswar. He finished the tournament as the highest scorer, with 18 goals.

In 2022, Bukkens was a member of the gold medal-winning squad at the EuroHockey Junior Championship in Ghent.

=== National team ===
Bukkens made his senior international debut in 2022 during season four of the FIH Pro League.
