= Jean Danneberg =

German field hockey player

Personal information
- Full name: Jean-Paul Danneberg
- Born: 8 November 2002 (age 23) Germany

Sport
- Sport: Field hockey
- Position: Goalkeeper
- Club: Rot-Weiss Köln
Youth career
- Team
- –: TEC Darmstadt
- –: Mannheimer HC
Senior career
Years	Team	Caps	Goals
–2022	Mannheimer HC	-	-
2022–present	Rot-Weiss Köln	-	-
National team
Years	Team	Caps	Goals
2021–2022	Germany U21	7	(0)
2022–present	Germany	32	(0)
Medal record
Men's field hockey
Representing Germany
Olympic Games
Silver medal – second place	2024 Paris	Team
World Cup
Gold medal – first place	2023 Bhubaneswar–Rourkela
Gold medal – first place	2026 Wavre/Amstelveen
EuroHockey Championships
Gold medal – first place	2025 Mönchengladbach
Junior World Cup
Silver medal – second place	2021 Bhubaneswar
EuroHockey Junior Championship
Silver medal – second place	2022 Ghent

Jean-Paul Danneberg (born 8 November 2002) is a German field hockey player who plays as a goalkeeper for Bundesliga club Rot-Weiss Köln and the German national team. He represented Germany at the 2024 Summer Olympics.

== Club career ==
Danneberg started playing hockey at TEC Darmstadt, at the age of nine he moved to Mannheimer HC. In the summer of 2022 he moved to Rot-Weiss Köln, where he first was second goalkeeper to Vincent Vanasch. When Vanasch left in 2023 he became the team's first-choice goalkeeper.

== Honours ==
=== Club ===
Rot-Weiss Köln

- Bundesliga: 2022–23

=== International ===
Germany

- World Cup: 2023

=== Individual ===
- EuroHockey Junior Championship Goalkeeper of the Tournament: 2022
- EuroHockey Championship Goalkeeper of the Tournament: 2023
