= Timo Boers =

Dutch field hockey player (born 2003)

Personal information
- Born: 10 October 2003 (age 22) 's-Hertogenbosch, Netherlands

Sport
- Sport: Field hockey
- Position: Defender
- Club: Den Bosch
National team
Years	Team	Caps	Goals
2023–2024	Netherlands U21	11	(8)
2023–present	Netherlands	8	(2)
Medal record
Men's field hockey
Representing Netherlands
EuroHockey U21 Championship
Silver medal – second place	2024 Terrassa

Timo Boers (born 10 October 2003) is a Dutch field hockey player who plays as a defender for Hoofdklasse club Den Bosch and the Netherlands national team.

== Personal life ==
Timo Boers was born and raised in 's-Hertogenbosch, Netherlands.

== Club career ==
In the Dutch national league, the Hoofdklasse, Boers represents Den Bosch. In the 2024–25 season he won the Gold Cup for the second time with Den Bosch. He also became the top goalscorer of the Hoofdklasse for the first time with 28 goals.

== International career ==
=== Under–21 ===
Boers made his international debut at under–21 level. He made his first appearances for the Netherlands U–21 team in 2023, at the FIH Junior World Cup in Kuala Lumpur. During the tournament he scored three goals, helping the team to a fifth-place finish. In 2024 he won his first and only medal with the squad, taking home silver at the EuroHockey U21 Championship in Terrassa.

=== Oranje ===
Prior to making his junior international debut, Boers received his first call–up to the Oranje squad. He earned his first senior international cap in June 2023, during a match against India in Eindhoven, during the fourth season of the FIH Pro League. In 2024 he was officially raised into the senior national squad for the first time.

== Honours ==
Den Bosch

- Gold Cup: 2022–23, 2024–25

Netherlands

- FIH Pro League: 2022–23

Individual

- Hoofdklasse top goalscorer: 2024–25
