= Andreas Rafi =

Spanish field hockey player (born 2002)

Personal information
- Full name: Andreas Rafi Dvořáček
- Born: 24 April 2002 (age 24)

Sport
- Sport: Field hockey
- Position: Midfielder
Senior career
Years	Team	Caps	Goals
2023–	Mannheimer HC	-	-
National team
Years	Team	Caps	Goals
2022–	Spain	22	(0)
2022–2023	Spain U–21	15	(5)
Medal record
Men's field hockey
Representing Spain
Junior World Cup
Bronze medal – third place	2023 Kuala Lumpur	Team

Andreas Rafi Dvořáček (born 24 April 2002) is a Spanish field hockey player, who plays as a midfielder.

== Career ==
=== Domestic hockey ===
In 2023, Rafi joined Mannheimer in the German Bundesliga.

=== National teams ===
==== Under–21 ====
Rafi made his debut for the Junior Red Sticks in 2022, at the EuroHockey Junior Championship in Ghent.

In 2023 Rafi was named captain of the junior national team. He led the team at a Four–Nations tournament in Düsseldorf, as well as the FIH Junior World Cup in Kuala Lumpur.

==== Red Sticks ====
Rafi made his senior international debut for the Red Sticks in 2022, during season three of the FIH Pro League.

He is currently a member of the national squad.
