= Pol Cabré-Verdiell =

Spanish field hockey player (born 2003)

Personal information
- Full name: Pol Cabré-Verdiell Badia
- Born: 22 April 2003 (age 23)

Sport
- Sport: Field hockey
- Position: Midfielder / Forward
- Club: Oranje-Rood
Senior career
Years	Team	Caps	Goals
–2025	Atlètic Terrassa	-	-
2025–present	Oranje-Rood	-	-
National team
Years	Team	Caps	Goals
2021–2024	Spain U21	26	(14)
2024–present	Spain	23	(6)
Medal record
Men's field hockey
Representing Spain
World Cup
Silver medal – second place	2026 Wavre/Amstelveen
EuroHockey Championship
Bronze medal – third place	2025 Mönchengladbach
FIH Hockey Junior World Cup
Bronze medal – third place	2023 Kuala Lumpur
EuroHockey U21 Championship
Gold medal – first place	2024 Terrassa

Pol Cabré-Verdiell Badia (born 22 April 2003) is a Spanish field hockey who plays as a midfielder or forward for Dutch Hoofdklasse club Oranje-Rood and the Spain national team.

== Club career ==
Cabré-Verdiell is a product of the Atlètic Terrassa youth academy. He played in the first team of Atlètic Terrassa until 2025, when he moved to the Netherlands to play for Oranje-Rood, where he signed for two seasons.

== International career ==
=== Under–21 ===
Cabré-Verdiell made his international debut at under–21 level in 2021. He represented the Spanish U–21 team at the FIH Junior World Cup in Bhubaneswar.

He followed this up with another appearance at the 2022 EuroHockey Junior Championship in Ghent. In 2023, he won his first medal with the junior team, taking home bronze at the FIH Junior World Cup in Kuala Lumpur. He also made appearances during a four–nations tournament in Düsseldorf earlier in the year.

=== Senior national teams ===
Cabré-Verdiell was called up to the national squad for the first time in 2024. He made his debut for the Red Sticks during season five of the FIH Pro League.
