= 2023 Men's FIH Hockey Junior World Cup =

13th edition of the Men's FIH Hockey Junior World Cup

Tournament details
- Host country: Malaysia
- City: Kuala Lumpur
- Dates: 5–16 December
- Teams: 16 (from 5 confederations)
- Venue: Malaysia National Hockey Stadium

Final positions
- Champions: Germany (7th title)
- Runner-up: France
- Third place: Spain

Tournament statistics
- Matches played: 48
- Goals scored: 270 (5.63 per match)
- Top scorer: (Belgium) Hugo Labouchere (9 goals)
- Best player: (France) Gaspard Xavier
- Best goalkeeper: (Germany) Joshua Onyekwue

The 2023 Men's FIH Hockey Junior World Cup was the 13th edition of the Men's FIH Hockey Junior World Cup, the biennial men's under-21 field hockey world championship organized by the International Hockey Federation. It was held at the Malaysia National Hockey Stadium in Kuala Lumpur, Malaysia from 5 to 16 December 2023.

Germany won a record-extending seventh title by defeating France 2–1 in the final. They also eliminated the defending champions Argentina in the quarter-final. Spain won their second bronze medal at the Junior World Cup as they defeated India 3–1.

== Qualification ==
Alongside the hosts, Malaysia, the 15 other teams qualified via the continental championships.

Dates	Event	Location	Quotas	Qualifier(s)
2 July 2021	Hosts	—N/a	1	Malaysia
24–30 July 2022	2022 EuroHockey Junior Championship	Ghent, Belgium	5	Netherlands; Germany; Belgium; Spain; France
8–11 December 2022	2022 Junior Oceania Cup	Canberra, Australia	2	Australia; New Zealand
12–16 March 2023	2023 Junior Africa Cup	Ismailia, Egypt	2	South Africa; Egypt
10–17 April 2023	2023 Junior Pan American Championship	Bridgetown, Barbados	3	Argentina; Canada; Chile
23 May – 1 June 2023	2023 Junior Asia Cup	Salalah, Oman	3	India; Pakistan; South Korea
Total			16	

== Squads ==
Players born on or after 1 January 2002 were eligible to compete in the tournament.

== Preliminary round ==
Pools and fixtures were established on the basis of the FIH Junior World Rankings, introduced in 2023.

All times are local (UTC+08:00).

=== Pool A ===
Pos	Team	Pld	W	D	L	GF	GA	GD	Pts	Qualification
1	Argentina	3	3	0	0	13	0	+13	9	Quarter–finals
2	Australia	3	2	0	1	12	4	+8	6	Quarter–finals
3	Malaysia (H)	3	1	0	2	9	10	−1	3	
4	Chile	3	0	0	3	2	22	−20	0	

Source: FIH
Rules for classification: 1) points; 2) matches won; 3) goal difference; 4) goals for; 5) head-to-head result; 6) field goals scored.
(H) Hosts

5 December 2023
16:00

Argentina	1–0	Australia
Nardolillo 58'	Report

Umpires:
Nick Bennett (ENG)
You Hyo-sik (KOR)

5 December 2023
20:00

Malaysia	7–1	Chile
Osman 13'; Aiman 23'; Jeffrynus 36'; Misron 39'; Shamsul 41'; Shahmie 47', 55'	Report	Wolansky 34'

Umpires:
Benjamin Peters (USA)
Łukasz Zwierzchowski (POL)

6 December 2023
18:00

Australia	7–1	Chile
Burns 11'; Foster 17'; Marais 20', 52', 53'; Geddes 30'; Mathison 47'	Report	Muñoz 14'

Umpires:
Rajput Sourabh (IND)
Antonio Ilgrande (ITA)

6 December 2023
20:00

Malaysia	0–4	Argentina
	Report	Capurro 20'; Aguirre Gómez Corta 28'; Minadeo 44'; Fernández 48'

Umpires:
Bevan Nichol (NZL)
Tim Meissner (GER)

8 December 2023
18:00

Argentina	8–0	Chile
Nardolillo 17'; Rey 21'; Capurro 33', 49', 50'; Minadeo 55'; Rodríguez 56'; Aguirre Gómez Corta 60'	Report

Umpires:
Antonio Ilgrande (ITA)
Jonathan von Hoesslin (RSA)

8 December 2023
20:00

Australia	5–2	Malaysia
Burns 2'; Lambeth 6', 28'; Geddes 15', 45'	Report	Osman 21'; Daniel 44'

Umpires:
Bruce Bale (ENG)
Tim Meissner (GER)

=== Pool B ===
Pos	Team	Pld	W	D	L	GF	GA	GD	Pts	Qualification
1	France	3	3	0	0	10	5	+5	9	Quarter–finals
2	Germany	3	2	0	1	15	5	+10	6	Quarter–finals
3	South Africa	3	1	0	2	10	12	−2	3	
4	Egypt	3	0	0	3	3	16	−13	0	

Source: FIH
Rules for classification: 1) points; 2) matches won; 3) goal difference; 4) goals for; 5) head-to-head result; 6) field goals scored.

5 December 2023
09:00

France	3–1	Egypt
Morcrette 21'; Mat. Clément 25'; Denis 38'	Report	El-Hadi 49'

Umpires:
Nazmi Kamaruddin (MAS)
Bevan Nichol (NZL)

5 December 2023
11:00

Germany	5–3	South Africa
Glander 5'; Sperling 10'; Holdermann 24'; Poljaric 41'; Hasbach 59'	Report	Tshebi 24'; Brooker 39'; Neethling 53'

Umpires:
Zeke Newman (AUS)
Rajput Sourabh (IND)

6 December 2023
14:00

South Africa	3–2	Egypt
Le Forestier 11'; Davis 14'; Brooker 26'	Report	Ragab 22', 38'

Umpires:
Łukasz Zwierzchowski (POL)
Nick Bennett (ENG)

6 December 2023
16:00

France	2–0	Germany
J. Verrier 10', 40'	Report

Umpires:
Benjamin Peters (USA)
James Unkles (AUS)

8 December 2023
09:00

South Africa	4–5	France
Neethling 14'; Oliphant 15'; Le Forestier 21', 25'	Report	J. Verrier 1'; Branicki 4'; Denis 15'; Mat. Clément 22'; Haertelmeyer 27'

Umpires:
Łukasz Zwierzchowski (POL)
Zeke Newman (AUS)

8 December 2023
11:00

Germany	10–0	Egypt
Sperling 10', 25'; Berendts 14', 50', 58'; Holdermann 17', 22'; Brilla 19'; Struthoff 32'; Glander 42'	Report

Umpires:
You Hyo-sik (KOR)
Rajput Sourabh (IND)

=== Pool C ===
Pos	Team	Pld	W	D	L	GF	GA	GD	Pts	Qualification
1	Spain	3	3	0	0	19	3	+16	9	Quarter–finals
2	India	3	2	0	1	15	7	+8	6	Quarter–finals
3	South Korea	3	1	0	2	8	13	−5	3	
4	Canada	3	0	0	3	2	21	−19	0	

Source: FIH
Rules for classification: 1) points; 2) matches won; 3) goal difference; 4) goals for; 5) head-to-head result; 6) field goals scored.

5 December 2023
14:00

Spain	7–0	Canada
Álvarez 2'; Cabré-Verdiell 11'; Rafi 18'; Bozal 44', 45'; Barutell 52'; Font 55'	Report

Umpires:
Tim Meissner (GER)
Jonathan von Hoesslin (RSA)

5 December 2023
18:00

India	4–2	South Korea
Araijeet 11', 16', 41'; Amandeep 30'	Report	Lim D. 38'; Kim M. 45'

Umpires:
James Unkles (AUS)
Antonio Ilgrande (ITA)

7 December 2023
09:00

South Korea	4–1	Canada
Lim D. 37', 38', 42', 46'	Report	Thind 24'

Umpires:
Hideki Kinoshita (JPN)
Nick Bennett (ENG)

7 December 2023
20:00

Spain	4–1	India
Cabré-Verdiell 1', 41'; Rafi 18', 60'	Report	Rohit 33'

Umpires:
Bevan Nichol (NZL)
Bruce Bale (ENG)

9 December 2023
09:00

South Korea	2–8	Spain
Lee S. 29'; Park G. 58'	Report	Cabré-Verdiell 5', 6'; Miralles 14'; Font 16'; Álvarez 18', 26'; Espino 32', 35'

Umpires:
Nick Bennett (ENG)
James Unkles (AUS)

9 December 2023
18:00

India	10–1	Canada
Aditya 8', 43'; Rohit 12', 55'; Amandeep 23', 51'; Vishnukant 42'; Rajinder 42'; Sourabh Anand 51'; Uttam 58'	Report	Nicholson 20'

Umpires:
Benjamin Peters (USA)
Bevan Nichol (NZL)

=== Pool D ===
Pos	Team	Pld	W	D	L	GF	GA	GD	Pts	Qualification
1	Netherlands	3	2	1	0	11	7	+4	7	Quarter–finals
2	Pakistan	3	1	2	0	8	4	+4	5	Quarter–finals
3	Belgium	3	1	1	1	8	6	+2	4	
4	New Zealand	3	0	0	3	1	11	−10	0	

Source: FIH
Rules for classification: 1) points; 2) matches won; 3) goal difference; 4) goals for; 5) head-to-head result; 6) field goals scored.

6 December 2023
09:00

Netherlands	3–3	Pakistan
Aardenburg 21'; Van der Veen 30'; Hortensius 47'	Report	Liaqat 32'; Khan 36'; Ahmad 55'

Umpires:
Bruce Bale (ENG)
You Hyo-sik (KOR)

6 December 2023
11:00

Belgium	4–0	New Zealand
Labouchere 18'; Vloeberghs 18'; Depelsenaire 21'; Crols 34'	Report

Umpires:
Hideki Kinoshita (JPN)
Zeke Newman (AUS)

7 December 2023
11:00

Pakistan	4–0	New Zealand
Liaqat 19', 30', 54'; Shahid 32'	Report

Umpires:
Jonathan von Hoesslin (RSA)
James Unkles (AUS)

7 December 2023
18:00

Belgium	3–5	Netherlands
Labouchere 10', 35'; Langer 12'	Report	Boers 9', 60'; Van der Veen 18'; Veen 40'; Boeren 53'

Umpires:
Nazmi Kamaruddin (MAS)
Benjamin Peters (USA)

9 December 2023
11:00

Netherlands	3–1	New Zealand
Hortensius 19', 31'; Van der Veen 22'	Report	Nicolson 33'

Umpires:
Hideki Kinoshita (JPN)
Tim Meissner (GER)

9 December 2023
20:00

Pakistan	1–1	Belgium
Ahmad 42'	Report	Vloeberghs 3'

Umpires:
Zeke Newman (AUS)
Nazmi Kamaruddin (MAS)

== Classification round ==
=== Bracket ===
Ninth to sixteenth
11 December
Malaysia	4
Egypt	1
11 December
Belgium	12
Canada	0
11 December
South Africa	5
Chile	1
11 December
South Korea	2
New Zealand	3

Cross-overs
13 December
Malaysia	2 (3)
Belgium (p.s.o.)	2 (5)
13 December
South Africa (p.s.o.)	3 (4)
New Zealand	3 (3)

Ninth place
15 December
Belgium	2
South Africa	1
Eleventh place
15 December
Malaysia	2 (3)
New Zealand (p.s.o.)	2 (4)

=== Ninth to sixteenth place quarter-finals ===
11 December 2023
09:00

Malaysia	4–1	Egypt
Osman 8'; Harizan 16'; Aiman 44'; Che 50'	Report	Abdelmonem 59'

Umpires:
Hideki Kinoshita (JPN)
You Hyo-sik (KOR)

11 December 2023
11:15

Belgium	12–0	Canada
Luyten 2', 4', 10', 56'; Balthazar 20', 38', 58'; Labouchere 34', 35', 42', 52'; Crols 53'	Report

Umpires:
Bruce Bale (ENG)
Jonathan von Hoesslin (RSA)

11 December 2023
15:45

South Africa	5–1	Chile
Ditlhakanyane 3 ' Tshebi 12'; Neethling 32', 37'; Ansell 53'	Report	Acevedo 59'

Umpires:
Nazmi Kamaruddin (MAS)
Rajput Sourabh (IND)

11 December 2023
18:00

South Korea	2–3	New Zealand
Lim J. 10'; Lim D. 38'	Report	J. Elmes 27'; Hickson 37'; Cosslett 48'

Umpires:
Antonio Ilgrande (ITA)
Łukasz Zwierzchowski (POL)

=== Thirteenth to sixteenth place classification ===
Cross-overs
13 December
Egypt (p.s.o.)	1 (3)
Canada	1 (2)
13 December
Chile	1
South Korea	2

Thirteenth place
15 December
Egypt	3
South Korea	4
Fifteenth place
15 December
Canada	1
Chile	4

==== Cross-overs ====
13 December 2023
09:00

Egypt	1–1	Canada
Awad 31'	Report	Sidhu 12'
Penalties
Abdelmonem (penalty shoot-out missed); Ali (penalty shoot-out scored); Awad (penalty shoot-out missed); Kamal (penalty shoot-out scored); Ragab (penalty shoot-out scored)	3–2	(penalty shoot-out scored) Nicholson; (penalty shoot-out missed) Sidhu; (penalty shoot-out scored) Sidhu; (penalty shoot-out missed) De Souza; (penalty shoot-out missed) Thind

Umpires:
Jonathan von Hoesslin (RSA)
Antonio Ilgrande (ITA)

13 December 2023
11:15

Chile	1–2	South Korea
Muñoz 25'	Report	Seo 52'; Kim D. 54'

Umpires:
Łukasz Zwierzchowski (POL)
Benjamin Peters (USA)

==== Fifteenth and sixteenth place ====
15 December 2023
09:00

Canada	1–4	Chile
Thind 28'	Report	Wolansky 13', 57'; Muñoz 18'; Richard 55'

Umpires:
Łukasz Zwierzchowski (POL)
Hideki Kinoshita (JPN)

==== Thirteenth and fourteenth place ====
15 December 2023
11:15

Egypt	3–4	South Korea
Kamal 26'; Ragab 38'; Mokhtar 51'	Report	Choi J. 28'; Ryu 29'; Lim D. 36', 59'

Umpires:
Tim Meissner (GER)
Antonio Ilgrande (ITA)

=== Ninth to twelfth place classification ===
==== Cross-overs ====
13 December 2023
15:00

Malaysia	2–2	Belgium
Ashraf 37', 51'	Report	Luyten 28'; Labouchere 36'
Penalties
Suhaimi (penalty shoot-out scored); Kamal (penalty shoot-out scored); Harizan (penalty shoot-out scored); Liau (penalty shoot-out missed)	3–5	(penalty shoot-out scored) Bogaerts; (penalty shoot-out scored) Feldheim; (penalty shoot-out scored) Foubert; (penalty shoot-out scored) Putters; (penalty shoot-out scored) Hainaut

Umpires:
Zeke Newman (AUS)
Hideki Kinoshita (JPN)

13 December 2023
17:15

South Africa	3–3	New Zealand
Neethling 34', 49'; Mthalane 40'	Report	Bax 11'; Lints 13'; Hickson 34'
Penalties
Neethling (penalty shoot-out scored); Le Forestier (penalty shoot-out scored); Neuhoff (penalty shoot-out scored); Kahder (penalty shoot-out missed); Knott (penalty shoot-out missed); Neethling (penalty shoot-out scored)	4–3	(penalty shoot-out scored) Irwin; (penalty shoot-out scored) J. Elmes; (penalty shoot-out missed) Torr; (penalty shoot-out missed) Lints; (penalty shoot-out scored) Ward; (penalty shoot-out missed) J. Elmes

Umpires:
Nick Bennett (ENG)
Rajput Sourabh (IND)

==== Eleventh and twelfth place ====
15 December 2023
15:00

Malaysia	2–2	New Zealand
Ashraf 6'; Shamsul 57'	Report	Aldred 4'; Lints 9'
Penalties
Najmie (penalty shoot-out scored); Kamal (penalty shoot-out missed); Ashraf (penalty shoot-out missed); Osman (penalty shoot-out scored); Harizan (penalty shoot-out scored); Osman (penalty shoot-out missed)	3–4	(penalty shoot-out scored) Irwin; (penalty shoot-out scored) J. Elmes; (penalty shoot-out missed) Torr; (penalty shoot-out missed) Lints; (penalty shoot-out scored) Ward; (penalty shoot-out scored) Irwin

Umpires:
Rajput Sourabh (IND)
You Hyosik (KOR)

==== Ninth and tenth place ====
15 December 2023
17:15

Belgium	2–1	South Africa
Labouchere 26'; De Backer 28'	Report	Brooker 36'

Umpires:
Bevan Nichol (NZL)
James Unkles (AUS)

== Medal round ==
=== Bracket ===
Quarter-finals
12 December
Argentina	1
Germany	2
12 December
Netherlands	3
India	4
12 December
France	3
Australia	2
12 December
Spain	4
Pakistan	2

Semi-finals
14 December
Germany	4
India	1
14 December
France	3
Spain	1

Final
16 December
Germany	2
France	1
Third place
16 December
India	1
Spain	3

=== Quarter-finals ===
12 December 2023
09:00

Argentina	1–2	Germany
Bonanno 48'	Report	Von Montgelas 32'; Brilla 39'

Umpires:
James Unkles (AUS)
Nazmi Kamaruddin (MAS)

12 December 2023
11:15

Netherlands	3–4	India
Boers 5'; Van der Heijden 16'; Hortensius 44'	Report	Aditya 34'; Araijeet 35'; Sourabh 52'; Uttam 57'

Umpires:
Nick Bennett (ENG)
Benjamin Peters (USA)

12 December 2023
15:45

France	3–2	Australia
Jouin 17', 43'; Denis 21'	Report	Burns 43', 48'

Umpires:
Bevan Nichol (NZL)
Tim Meissner (GER)

12 December 2023
18:00

Spain	4–2	Pakistan
Cabré-Verdiell 37', 45'; Bozal 38'; Espino 41'	Report	Shahid 12'; Khan 43'

Umpires:
Antonio Ilgrande (ITA)
Bruce Bale (ENG)

=== Fifth to eighth place classification ===
Cross-overs
14 December
Argentina	0
Netherlands	1
14 December
Australia	7
Pakistan	5

Fifth place
16 December
Netherlands	2
Australia	1
Seventh place
16 December
Argentina	6
Pakistan	3

==== Cross-overs ====
14 December 2023
09:00

Argentina	0–1	Netherlands
	Report	Lucieer 36'

Umpires:
Hideki Kinoshita (JPN)
Bevan Nichol (NZL)

14 December 2023
11:15

Australia	7–5	Pakistan
Czinner 3', 41'; Geddes 29', 37', 40'; Foster 32', 46'	Report	Qayyum 14', 57'; Mustafa 34'; Aslam 48'; Khan 60'

Umpires:
Benjamin Peters (USA)
Jonathan von Hoesslin (RSA)

==== Seventh and eighth place ====
16 December 2023
09:00

Argentina	6–3	Pakistan
T. Ruiz 6', 21'; Infanzón 39'; Capurro 44'; Persoglio 50'; Fernández 56'	Report	Ahmad 12', 26', 49'

Umpires:
Tim Meissner (GER)
Lukasz Zwierzchowski (POL)

==== Fifth and sixth place ====
16 December 2023
11:15

Netherlands	2–1	Australia
Lucieer 23'; Van der Veen 45'	Report	Burns 58'

Umpires:
Nazmi Kamaruddin (MAS)
Jonathan von Hoesslin (RSA)

=== First to fourth place classification ===
==== Semi-finals ====
14 December 2023
18:00

Germany	4–1	India
Hasbach 8', 30'; Glander 41'; Sperling 58'	Report	Sudeep 11'

Umpires:
Zeke Newman (AUS)
Nick Bennett (ENG)

14 December 2023
20:30

France	3–1	Spain
Delemazure 2'; Branicki 33'; Haertelmeyer 42'	Report	Bozal 15'

Umpires:
You Hyo-sik (KOR)
Nazmi Kamaruddin (MAS)

==== Third and fourth place ====
16 December 2023
18:00

India	1–3	Spain
Sunil 28'	Report	Álvarez 25', 51'; Petchamé 40'

Umpires:
James Unkles (AUS)
You Hyo-sik (KOR)

==== Final ====
16 December 2023
20:30

Germany	2–1	France
Cordes 32'; Holdermann 40'	Report	J. Verrier 17'

Umpires:
Bruce Bale (ENG)
Zeke Newman (AUS)

== Statistics ==
=== Final standings ===
As per statistical convention in field hockey, matches decided in extra time are counted as wins and losses, while matches decided by penalty shoot-outs are counted as draws.

Pos	Grp	Team	Pld	W	D	L	GF	GA	GD	Pts	Final result
1	B	Germany	6	5	0	1	23	8	+15	15	Gold medal
2	B	France	6	5	0	1	17	10	+7	15	Silver medal
3	C	Spain	6	5	0	1	27	9	+18	15	Bronze medal
4	C	India	6	3	0	3	21	17	+4	9	
5	D	Netherlands	6	4	1	1	17	12	+5	13	Losing quarter-finalists
6	A	Australia	6	3	0	3	22	14	+8	9	Losing quarter-finalists
7	A	Argentina	6	4	0	2	20	6	+14	12	Losing quarter-finalists
8	D	Pakistan	6	1	2	3	18	21	−3	5	Losing quarter-finalists
9	D	Belgium	6	3	2	1	24	9	+15	11	Crossover winners
10	B	South Africa	6	2	1	3	19	18	+1	7	Crossover winners
11	D	New Zealand	6	1	2	3	9	18	−9	5	Crossover winners
12	A	Malaysia (H)	6	2	2	2	17	15	+2	8	Crossover winners
13	C	South Korea	6	3	0	3	16	20	−4	9	Crossover losers
14	B	Egypt	6	0	1	5	8	25	−17	1	Crossover losers
15	A	Chile	6	1	0	5	8	30	−22	3	Crossover losers
16	C	Canada	6	0	1	5	4	38	−34	1	Crossover losers

Source: FIH
(H) Hosts

=== Goalscorers ===
There were 270 goals scored in 48 matches, for an average of 5.62 goals per match.

9 goals

- (Belgium) Hugo Labouchere

8 goals

- (South Korea) Lim Do-hyun

7 goals

- (Spain) Pol Cabré-Verdiell

6 goals

- (Australia) Cambell Geddes
- (South Africa) Hans Neethling

5 goals

- (Argentina) Bautista Capurro
- (Australia) Cooper Burns
- (Belgium) Max Luyten
- (Pakistan) Arbaz Ahmad
- (Spain) Nicolás Álvarez

4 goals

- (France) Jules Verrier
- (Germany) Liam Holdermann
- (Germany) Florian Sperling
- (India) Araijeet Singh Hundal
- (Netherlands) Olivier Hortensius
- (Netherlands) Casper van der Veen
- (Pakistan) Arshad Liaqat

3 goals

- (Australia) Brodee Foster
- (Australia) Craig Marais
- (Belgium) Lucas Balthazar
- (Chile) Joaquín Muñoz
- (Chile) Sebastián Wolansky
- (Egypt) Hossameldin Ragab
- (France) Gaspard Denis
- (Germany) Nikas Berendts
- (Germany) Paul Glander
- (Germany) Ben Hasbach
- (India) Aditya Lalage
- (India) Rohit
- (Malaysia) Adam Ashraf
- (Malaysia) Harris Osman
- (Netherlands) Timo Boers
- (Pakistan) Sufyan Khan
- (South Africa) Jaydon Brooker
- (South Africa) Cameron Le Forestier
- (Spain) Pablo Espino
- (Spain) Andreas Rafi

2 goals

- (Argentina) Marco Aguirre Gómez Corta
- (Argentina) Juan Fernández
- (Argentina) Iñaki Minadeo
- (Argentina) Ignacio Nardolillo
- (Argentina) Tomás Ruiz
- (Australia) Nathan Czinner
- (Australia) Jake Lambeth
- (Belgium) Thomas Crols
- (Belgium) Jack Vloeberghs
- (Canada) Robin Thind
- (France) Stanislas Branicki
- (France) Mathis Clément
- (France) Louis Haertelmeyer
- (France) Noé Jouin
- (Germany) Jakob Brilla
- (India) Sourabh Anand Kushwaha
- (India) Amandeep Lakra
- (India) Uttam Singh
- (Malaysia) Danish Aiman Muhammad
- (Malaysia) Shamir Shamsul
- (Malaysia) Shahmie Irfan Suhaimi
- (Netherlands) Dylan Lucieer
- (New Zealand) James Hickson
- (New Zealand) Sam Lints
- (Pakistan) Abdul Qayyum
- (Pakistan) Hannan Shahid
- (South Africa) David Tshebi
- (Spain) Aleix Bozal
- (Spain) Oriol Bozal
- (Spain) Bruno Font

1 goal

- (Argentina) Agustín Bonanno
- (Argentina) Ramiro Infanzón
- (Argentina) Ignacio Persoglio
- (Argentina) Matías Rey
- (Argentina) Nicolás Rodríguez
- (Australia) William Mathison
- (Belgium) Louis de Backer
- (Belgium) Louis Depelsenaire
- (Belgium) Maximilian Langer
- (Canada) Jude Nicholson
- (Canada) Maansarovar Sidhu
- (Chile) Alexei De Witt
- (Chile) Felipe Richard
- (Egypt) Basel Abdelmonem
- (Egypt) Hussein Awad
- (Egypt) Ahmed El-Hadi
- (Egypt) Said Kamal
- (Egypt) Bassem Mokhtar
- (France) Brieuc Delemazure
- (France) Arthur Morcrette
- (Germany) Jan Cordes
- (Germany) Matteo Poljaric
- (Germany) Michel Struthoff
- (Germany) Hugo von Montgelas
- (India) Amandeep
- (India) Sudeep Chirmako
- (India) Sunil Jojo
- (India) Rajinder Singh
- (India) Vishnukant Singh
- (Malaysia) Nur Aqilrullah Che
- (Malaysia) Faris Harizan
- (Malaysia) Andywalfian Jeffrynus
- (Malaysia) Azmilmuizzuddin Misron
- (Malaysia) Shafiq Ikhmal Daniel
- (Netherlands) Boris Aardenburg
- (Netherlands) Menno Boeren
- (Netherlands) Pepijn van der Heijden
- (Netherlands) Lucas Veen
- (New Zealand) Luke Aldred
- (New Zealand) Aiden Bax
- (New Zealand) Scott Cosslett
- (New Zealand) Jonty Elmes
- (New Zealand) James Nicolson
- (Pakistan) Ahtisham Aslam
- (Pakistan) Umar Mustafa
- (South Africa) Nathan Ansell
- (South Africa) Calvin Davis
- (South Africa) Leruo Ditlhakanyane
- (South Africa) Ayakha Mthalane
- (South Africa) Caleb Oliphant
- (South Korea) Choi Ji-ho
- (South Korea) Kim Dae-hyun
- (South Korea) Kim Min-kwon
- (South Korea) Lee Seung-hwan
- (South Korea) Lim Jun-yeol
- (South Korea) Park Geon-woo
- (South Korea) Ryu Hoyun
- (South Korea) Seo Tae-won
- (Spain) Xavier Barutell
- (Spain) Enric Miralles
- (Spain) Pau Petchamé

Source: FIH

== Broadcasters ==
Region	Network	Ref.
Various	Watch.Hockey	
India	JioCinema, and Viacom Sports18	
Malaysia	Radio Televisyen Malaysia	

== See also ==
- 2023 Men's FIH Hockey World Cup
- 2023 Women's FIH Hockey Junior World Cup
