= Hugo Labouchere =

Dutch field hockey player (born 2003)

Personal information
- Born: 7 February 2004 (age 22) London, UK

Sport
- Sport: Field hockey
- Position: Defence
- Club: Royal Orée
National team
Years	Team	Caps	Goals
2023–	Belgium U–21	11	(17)
2025–	Belgium	2	(1)
Medal record
Men's field hockey
Representing Belgium
EuroHockey U–21 Championship
Bronze medal – third place	2024 Terrassa

Hugo Labouchere (born 7 February 2004) is a field hockey player from Belgium.

== Personal life ==
Hugo Labouchere was born in London and raised in Brussels, Belgium.

== Career ==
=== Domestic league ===
In the Belgian national league, the Carlsberg 0.0 Hockey League, Labouchere represents Royal Orée.

=== Under–21 ===
Labouchere made his international debut at under–21 level. He made his first appearances for the Belgian U–21 team in 2023, at the FIH Junior World Cup in Kuala Lumpur. During the tournament he scored nine times, finishing as leading goalscorer and helping the team to a ninth-place finish.

In 2024 he won his first medal with the junior squad, taking home bronze at the EuroHockey U–21 Championship in Terrassa.

=== Red Lions ===
Labouchere received his first call–up to the Red Lions in 2025. He earned his first senior international cap during a match against Argentina in Santiago del Estero, during the sixth season of the FIH Pro League.
