= 2022 Men's EuroHockey Junior Championship =

Hockey tournament

Tournament details
- Host country: Belgium
- City: Ghent
- Dates: 24–30 July
- Teams: 8 (from 1 confederation)
- Venue: La Gantoise HC

Final positions
- Champions: Netherlands (10th title)
- Runner-up: Germany
- Third place: Belgium

Tournament statistics
- Matches played: 20
- Goals scored: 92 (4.6 per match)
- Top scorer: (Germany) Benedikt Schwarzhaupt (6 goals)
- Best player: (Spain) Rafael Vilallonga
- Best goalkeeper: (Germany) Jean Danneberg

The 2022 Men's EuroHockey Junior Championship was the 20th edition of the Men's EuroHockey Junior Championship, the biennial international men's under-21 field hockey championship of Europe organised by the European Hockey Federation. The top five teams qualified for the 2023 Men's FIH Hockey Junior World Cup.

It was held alongside the women's tournament in Ghent, Belgium from 24 to 30 July 2022. The tournament was originally scheduled to be held in Wavre but a venue change was required due to the initial venue not being ready in time due to flooding.

The Netherlands won a record-extending tenth title by defeating the defending champions Germany 3–1 in the final. The hosts Belgium won the bronze medal by defeating Spain 3–1.

== Qualified teams ==
Participating nations qualified based on their final ranking from the 2019 competition.

| Dates | Event | Location | Quotas | Qualifier(s) |
|---|---|---|---|---|
| 15–21 July 2019 | 2019 EuroHockey Junior Championship | Valencia, Spain | 7 | Austria; Belgium; England; France; Germany; Netherlands; Spain |
| 14–20 July 2019 | 2019 EuroHockey Junior Championship II | Plzeň, Czech Republic | 1 | Scotland; ~~Russia~~ (Note: Russia was excluded due to the 2022 Russian invasion of Ukraine and were replaced by Austria.) |
| Total | | | 8 | |

== Preliminary round ==
=== Pool A ===
| Pos | Team | Pld | W | D | L | GF | GA | GD | Pts | Qualification |
|---|---|---|---|---|---|---|---|---|---|---|
| 1 | Spain | 3 | 3 | 0 | 0 | 16 | 4 | +12 | 9 | Semi-finals and 2023 Junior World Cup |
| 2 | Belgium (H) | 3 | 2 | 0 | 1 | 9 | 5 | +4 | 6 | Semi-finals and 2023 Junior World Cup |
| 3 | England | 3 | 1 | 0 | 2 | 5 | 7 | −2 | 3 | Pool C |
| 4 | Scotland | 3 | 0 | 0 | 3 | 2 | 16 | −14 | 0 | Pool C |

Source: FIH
Rules for classification: 1) points; 2) matches won; 3) goal difference; 4) goals for; 5) head-to-head result; 6) field goals for.
(H) Hosts

24 July 2022
15:30

| England | 2–1 | Scotland |
|---|---|---|
| Williamson 29'; Taylor 44' | Report | Caughey 18' |

Umpires:
Michael Dutrieux (BEL)
Ilaria Amorosini (ITA)

24 July 2022
17:45

| Belgium | 1–4 | Spain |
|---|---|---|
| Biekens 18' | Report | Rafi 12'; Font 32', 48'; Rodríguez 58' |

Umpires:
Shane O'Donnell (IRL)
Steven Bakker (NED)

26 July 2022
16:30

| Spain | 8–1 | Scotland |
|---|---|---|
| Vilallonga 4'; Bozal 9', 24', 51'; Fite 11'; Miralles 35'; Cabré-Verdiell 48'; Cunill 52' | Report | Smith 39' |

Umpires:
Oliver Tarnoczi (AUT)
Pauline Cuypers (BEL)

26 July 2022
18:45

| England | 1–2 | Belgium |
|---|---|---|
| Robson 12' | Report | Depelsenaire 33'; Foubert 55' |

Umpires:
Raphael Adrien (GER)
Steven Bakker (NED)

27 July 2022
15:30

| Belgium | 6–0 | Scotland |
|---|---|---|
| Crols 2', 14'; Hellin 6', 19', 26'; Depelsenaire 53' | Report |

Umpires:
Sandra Adell (ESP)
Jake Charles (ENG)

27 July 2022
15:30

| Spain | 4–2 | England |
|---|---|---|
| Rodríguez 2'; Petchame 14', 60'; Bozal 31' | Report | Penrose 39'; Pendle 44' |

Umpires:
Raphael Adrien (GER)
Pauline Cuypers (BEL)

=== Pool B ===
| Pos | Team | Pld | W | D | L | GF | GA | GD | Pts | Qualification |
|---|---|---|---|---|---|---|---|---|---|---|
| 1 | Germany | 3 | 2 | 1 | 0 | 12 | 3 | +9 | 7 | Semi-finals and 2023 Junior World Cup |
| 2 | Netherlands | 3 | 2 | 1 | 0 | 13 | 5 | +8 | 7 | Semi-finals and 2023 Junior World Cup |
| 3 | France | 3 | 0 | 1 | 2 | 3 | 6 | −3 | 1 | Pool C |
| 4 | Austria | 3 | 0 | 1 | 2 | 1 | 15 | −14 | 1 | Pool C |

Source: FIH
Rules for classification: 1) points; 2) matches won; 3) goal difference; 4) goals for; 5) head-to-head result; 6) field goals for.

24 July 2022
11:00

| Germany | 8–1 | Austria |
|---|---|---|
| Mazkour 3', 53'; Schwarzhaupt 7', 18', 24', 40'; Ludwig 27'; Himmler 43' | Report | Hackl 22' |

Umpires:
Jorge Ocaña (ESP)
Jake Charles (ENG)

24 July 2022
13:15

| Netherlands | 4–3 | France |
|---|---|---|
| Schouten 9'; Van der Veen 22'; Bukkens 35'; Jansen 37' | Report | Haertelmeyer 7'; Delemazure 59', 60' |

Umpires:
Sandra Adell (ESP)
Raphael Adrien (GER)

25 July 2022
12:00

| France | 0–0 | Austria |
|---|---|---|
| | Report |

Umpires:
Jamie Telfer (SCO)
Zoe Hall (ENG)

25 July 2022
14:15

| Germany | 2–2 | Netherlands |
|---|---|---|
| Ludwig 52'; Schwarzhaupt 58' | Report | Bukkens 4'; Hortensius 36' |

Umpires:
Jake Charles (ENG)
Michael Dutrieux (BEL)

27 July 2022
11:00

| France | 0–2 | Germany |
|---|---|---|
| | Report | Schwarzhaupt 12'; Sperling 31' |

Umpires:
Steven Bakker (NED)
Jamie Telfer (SCO)

27 July 2022
11:00

| Netherlands | 7–0 | Austria |
|---|---|---|
| Bukkens 6', 36'; Telgenkamp 12', 23', 30'; Middendorp 31'; Hortensius 48' | Report |

Umpires:
Shane O'Donnell (IRL)
Toni-Lee Lambert (WAL)

== Fifth to eighth place classification ==
The points obtained in the preliminary round against the other team are taken over.

=== Pool C ===
| Pos | Team | Pld | W | D | L | GF | GA | GD | Pts | Qualification or relegation |
|---|---|---|---|---|---|---|---|---|---|---|
| 5 | France | 3 | 2 | 1 | 0 | 8 | 2 | +6 | 7 | Qualification for the 2023 Junior World Cup |
| 6 | England | 3 | 2 | 0 | 1 | 7 | 5 | +2 | 6 | |
| 7 | Austria (R) | 3 | 0 | 2 | 1 | 2 | 5 | −3 | 2 | Relegation to the Junior Championship II |
| 8 | Scotland (R) | 3 | 0 | 1 | 2 | 3 | 8 | −5 | 1 | Relegation to the Junior Championship II |

Source: FIH
Rules for classification: 1) points; 2) matches won; 3) goal difference; 4) goals for; 5) head-to-head result; 6) field goals for.
(R) Relegated

29 July 2022
14:30

| England | 1–3 | France |
|---|---|---|
| Penrose 28' | Report | Verrier 20'; Sellier 31'; Haertelmeyer 45' |

Umpires:
Oliver Tarnoczi (AUT)
Jamie Telfer (SCO)

29 July 2022
16:45

| Scotland | 1–1 | Austria |
|---|---|---|
| McFadden 40' | Report | Mar. Nyckowiak 18' |

Umpires:
Shane O'Donnell (IRL)
Anatole Platel (FRA)

30 July 2022
11:30

| England | 4–1 | Austria |
|---|---|---|
| Williamson 11'; Kentwell 22'; Penrose 26'; Taylor 51' | Report | Hackl 44' |

Umpires:
Anatole PLatel (FRA)
Raphaël Adrien (GER)

30 July 2022
13:45

| France | 5–1 | Scotland |
|---|---|---|
| Sellier 2'; Verrier 3', 18', 54'; Bournac 25' | Report | Robb 21' |

Umpires:
Pauline Cuypers (BEL)
Michael Dutrieux (BEL)

== First to fourth place classification ==
=== Bracket ===
Semi-finals
29 July
Spain | 0
Netherlands | 3
29 July
Germany | 3
Belgium | 0

Final
30 July
Netherlands | 3
Germany | 1
Third place
30 July
Spain | 1
Belgium | 3

=== Semi-finals ===
29 July 2022
14:30

| Spain | 0–3 | Netherlands |
|---|---|---|
| | Report | Bukkens 15'; Jansen 23'; Schouten 27' |

Umpires:
Raphaël Adrien (GER)
Michael Dutrieux (BEL)

29 July 2022
16:45

| Germany | 3–0 | Belgium |
|---|---|---|
| Schachner 18'; Berendts 27'; Mazkour 33' | Report |

Umpires:
Jake Charles (ENG)
Steven Bakker (NED)

=== Third place match ===
30 July 2022
13:30

| Spain | 1–3 | Belgium |
|---|---|---|
| Cunill 5' | Report | Luyten 3', 8'; Geers 37' |

Umpires:
Jamie Telfer (SCO)
Oliver Tarnoczi (AUT)

=== Final ===
30 July 2022
18:00

| Netherlands | 3–1 | Germany |
|---|---|---|
| Middendorp 30'; Telgenkamp 38'; Dommershuijzen 49' | Report | Holzmüller 52' |

Umpires:
Shane O'Donnell (IRL)
Jake Charles (ENG)

== Final standings ==
| Pos | Team | Qualification or relegation |
|---|---|---|
| 1st place, gold medalist(s) | Netherlands | Qualification for the 2023 Junior World Cup |
| 2nd place, silver medalist(s) | Germany | Qualification for the 2023 Junior World Cup |
| 3rd place, bronze medalist(s) | Belgium (H) | Qualification for the 2023 Junior World Cup |
| 4 | Spain | Qualification for the 2023 Junior World Cup |
| 5 | France | Qualification for the 2023 Junior World Cup |
| 6 | England | |
| 7 | Austria (R) | Relegation to the Junior Championship II |
| 8 | Scotland (R) | Relegation to the Junior Championship II |

Source: FIH
(H) Host; (R) Relegated

== Goalscorers ==
There were 92 goals scored in 20 matches, for an average of 4.6 goals per match.

6 goals

- (Germany) Benedikt Schwarzhaupt

5 goals

- (Netherlands) Miles Bukkens

4 goals

- (France) Jules Verrier
- (Netherlands) Duco Telgenkamp
- (Spain) Oriol Bozal

3 goals

- (Belgium) Guillaume Hellin
- (England) Rory Penrose
- (Germany) Elian Mazkour

2 goals

- (Austria) Florian Hackl
- (Belgium) Thomas Crols
- (Belgium) Louis Depelsenaire
- (Belgium) Max Luyten
- (England) Sam Taylor
- (England) Conor Williamson
- (France) Brieuc Delemazure
- (France) Louis Haertelmeyer
- (France) Corentin Sellier
- (Germany) Moritz Ludwig
- (Netherlands) Olivier Hortensius
- (Netherlands) Guus Jansen
- (Netherlands) Floris Middendorp
- (Netherlands) Sheldon Schouten
- (Spain) Pepe Cunill
- (Spain) Bruno Font
- (Spain) Pau Petchame
- (Spain) Manuel Rodríguez

1 goal

- (Austria) Marcin Nyckowiak
- (Belgium) Tobias Biekens
- (Belgium) Victor Foubert
- (Belgium) Sebastiaan Geers
- (England) Stuart Kentwell
- (England) Alex Pendle
- (England) Ellis Robson
- (France) Jules Bournac
- (Germany) Nikas Berendts
- (Germany) Moritz Himmler
- (Germany) Phillip Holzmüller
- (Germany) Mario Schachner
- (Germany) Florian Sperling
- (Netherlands) Luke Dommershuijzen
- (Netherlands) Casper van der Veen
- (Scotland) Pete Caughey
- (Scotland) Iain McFadden
- (Scotland) Keir Robb
- (Scotland) Dominic Smith
- (Spain) Pol Cabré-Verdiell
- (Spain) Pol Fité
- (Spain) Enric Miralles
- (Spain) Andreas Rafi
- (Spain) Rafael Vilallonga

Source: FIH

== See also ==
- 2022 Men's EuroHockey Junior Championship II
- 2022 Women's EuroHockey Junior Championship
