= Boys' EuroHockey U18 Championship =

International field hockey competition

- Most recent season or competition: 2025 Boys' EuroHockey U18 Championship
- Formerly: Boys' EuroHockey Youth Championships
- Sport: Field hockey
- Founded: 2002; 24 years ago
- No. of teams: 8
- Confederation: EHF (Europe)
- Most recent champion: Germany (6th title) (2025)
- Most titles: Germany (6 titles)
- Level on pyramid: 1
- Relegation to: EuroHockey U18 Championship II

The EuroHockey Youth Championship is an international boys' and girls' under–18 field hockey competition organised by the European Hockey Federation (EHF). It is held biannually and is the top level Youth Championship for the under–18 age group.

Spain boys' and the Netherlands girls' teams are the current champions.

== Results ==
Year	Host	Final			Third place match			Number of teams
Year	Host	Winner	Score	Runner-up	Third place	Score	Fourth place	Number of teams
2002	Rotterdam, Netherlands	Ireland	–	Germany	Netherlands	–	Belgium	8
2003	Barcelona, Spain	Netherlands	–	Ireland	Spain	–	Belgium	8
2005	Gniezno, Poland	Netherlands	–	Belgium	England	–	Ireland	8
2007	Edinburgh, Scotland	Germany	–	Netherlands	Belgium	–	England	8
2009	Nivelles, Belgium	Belgium	–	Germany	Netherlands	–	England	8
2011	Utrecht, Netherlands	Belgium	–	Spain	Germany	–	Netherlands	8
2013; Details	Vienna, Austria	Spain	5–2	Germany	Netherlands	3–2	England	8
2015; Details	Santander, Spain	Germany	7–1	Netherlands	Spain	1–1 (3–1 s.o.)	Belgium	8
2016; Details	Cork, Ireland	Germany	4–3	Netherlands	Belgium	2–2 (2–1 s.o.)	England	8
2018; Details	Santander, Spain	Spain	2–1	Netherlands	Germany	1–0	Belgium	8
2020; Details	Kazan, Russia	Cancelled due to the COVID-19 pandemic.			Cancelled			8
2021; Details	Valencia, Spain	Germany	Round-robin tournament	Netherlands	Spain	Round-robin tournament	Belgium	5
2023; Details	Krefeld, Germany	Germany	3–2	Belgium	Netherlands	4–3	Spain	9
2025; Details	Lille, France	Germany	1–1 (3–2 s.o.)	France	Belgium	1–1 (3–0 s.o.)	Spain	8
2027; Details	Wavre, Belgium							8

=== Summary ===
Team	Winners	Runners-up	Third place	Fourth place
Germany	6 (2007, 2015, 2016, 2021, 2023, 2025)	3 (2002, 2009 2013)	2 (2011, 2018)	
Netherlands	2 (2003, 2005)	5 (2007, 2015, 2016, 2018, 2021)	4 (2002*, 2009, 2013, 2023)	1 (2011*)
Belgium	2 (2009*, 2011)	2 (2005, 2023)	3 (2007, 2016, 2025)	5 (2002, 2003, 2015, 2018, 2021)
Spain	2 (2013, 2018*)	1 (2011)	3 (2003*, 2015*, 2021*)	2 (2023, 2025)
Ireland	1 (2002)	1 (2003)		1 (2005)
France		1 (2025*)		
England			1 (2005)	4 (2007, 2009, 2013, 2016)

* = hosts

=== Team appearances ===
Team	(Netherlands) 2002	(Spain) 2003	(Poland) 2005	(Scotland) 2007	(Belgium) 2009	(Netherlands) 2011	(Austria) 2013	(Spain) 2015	(Republic of Ireland) 2016	(Spain) 2018	(Spain) 2021	(Germany) 2023	(France) 2025	(Belgium) 2027	Total
Austria	–	–	–	–	–	–	8th	–	–	–	–	8th	–	–	2
Belgium	4th	4th	2nd	3rd	1st	1st	5th	4th	3rd	4th	4th	2nd	3rd	Q	14
Czech Republic	–	–	–	–	–	–	–	–	8th	–	–	–	8th	–	2
England	7th	–	3rd	4th	4th	5th	4th	6th	4th	5th	–	5th	6th	Q	12
France	5th	7th	–	7th	–	6th	7th	–	–	7th	–	–	2nd	Q	8
Germany	2nd	5th	5th	1st	2nd	3rd	2nd	1st	1st	3rd	1st	1st	1st	Q	14
Ireland	1st	2nd	4th	8th	–	7th	–	5th	6th	6th	–	7th	–	Q	10
Italy	–	–	–	–	–	–	–	–	7th	–	–	–	–	Q	2
Netherlands	3rd	1st	1st	2nd	3rd	4th	3rd	2nd	2nd	2nd	2nd	3rd	5th	Q	14
Poland	8th	–	8th	–	8th	–	–	–	–	8th	–	9th	–	–	5
Russia	–	8th	–	6th	6th	8th	–	8th	–	–	5th	–	–	–	6
Scotland	–	6th	6th	5th	7th	–	6th	7th	–	–	–	6th	7th	–	8
Spain	6th	3rd	7th	–	5th	2nd	1st	3rd	5th	1st	3rd	4th	4th	Q	13
Total	8	8	8	8	8	8	8	8	8	8	5	9	8	8	

== See also ==
- Girls' EuroHockey U18 Championship
- Men's EuroHockey U21 Championship
