= Alexander Stadler =

German field hockey player

Personal information
- Born: 16 October 1999 (age 27) Heidelberg, Germany
- Height: 1.84 m (6 ft 0 in)

Sport
- Sport: Field hockey
- Position: Goalkeeper
- Club: Den Bosch
Youth career
- Team
- –: Heidelberg
Senior career
Years	Team	Caps	Goals
2016–2022	TSV Mannheim	-	-
2022–present	Den Bosch	-	-
National team
Years	Team	Caps	Goals
2017–2019	Germany U21	14	(0)
2018–present	Germany (indoor)	1	(0)
2020–present	Germany	29	(0)
Medal record
Representing Germany
Men's field hockey
World Cup
Gold medal – first place	2023 Bhubaneswar/Rourkela
EuroHockey Championships
Gold medal – first place	2025 Mönchengladbach
Silver medal – second place	2021 Amstelveen
EuroHockey Junior Championship
Gold medal – first place	2019 Valencia
Bronze medal – third place	2017 Valencia
Men's indoor hockey
EuroHockey Indoor Championship
Bronze medal – third place	2018 Antwerp

Alexander Stadler (born 16 October 1999) is a German field hockey player who plays as a goalkeeper for Dutch Hoofdklasse club Den Bosch and the German national team.

He competed in the 2020 Summer Olympics.

== Club career ==
Stadler played the first part of his senior career for TSV Mannheim. In 2022 he left Germany to play in the Dutch Hoofdklasse for Den Bosch.

== International career ==
Stadler was part of the under-21 Germany squad which won the 2019 Men's EuroHockey Junior Championship, he was named the best goalkeeper at the tournament. On 28 May 2021, he was named as the first goalkeeper in the senior squad for the 2021 EuroHockey Championship and the 2020 Summer Olympics. He won the silver medal at the 2021 EuroHockey Championship as they lost the final to the Netherlands after a shoot-out.

== Honours ==
=== Club ===
Den Bosch

- Gold Cup: 2022–23

=== International ===
Germany U21

- EuroHockey Junior Championship: 2019

Germany

- FIH Hockey World Cup: 2023

=== Individual ===
- EuroHockey Junior Championship Best Goalkeeper: 2019
