= 2022 Men's EuroHockey Indoor Championship II =

Tournament details
- Host country: Portugal
- City: Paredes
- Dates: 14–16 January
- Teams: 7 (from 1 confederation)
- Venue: Pavilhão Rota dos Móveis

Final positions
- Champions: Spain (1st title)
- Runner-up: Poland
- Third place: Croatia

Tournament statistics
- Matches played: 21
- Goals scored: 198 (9.43 per match)
- Top scorer: (Croatia) Mario Mucić (15 goals)

The 2022 Men's EuroHockey Indoor Championship II was the thirteenth edition of the Men's EuroHockey Indoor Championship II, the second level of the men's European indoor hockey championships organized by the European Hockey Federation. It took place from 14 to 16 January 2022 at the Pavilhão Rota dos Móveis in Paredes, Portugal.

Spain won their first Men's EuroHockey Indoor Championship II title by finishing top of the round-robin pool and were promoted to the Men's EuroHockey Indoor Championship in 2024 together with Poland, Croatia and Ukraine.

== Qualified teams ==
Participating nations have qualified based on their final ranking from the 2020 competition.

Dates	Event	Location	Quotas	Qualifiers
17–19 January 2020	2020 EuroHockey Indoor Championship	Berlin, Germany	2	Poland; Ukraine
17–19 January 2020	2020 EuroHockey Indoor Championship II	Lucerne, Switzerland	4	Croatia; ~~Italy~~; Portugal; Slovakia; Turkey
17–19 January 2020	2020 EuroHockey Indoor Championship III	Santander, Spain	1	Spain
Total			7	

== Umpires ==
The following 10 umpires were chosen for the tournament.

- Pieter Hembrecht (NED)
- David Sweetman (SCO)
- Daniel Veerman (NED)
- Duran Bayram (TUR)
- Lubos Kamendy (SVK)
- Paulo Lima (POR)
- Jorge Ocaña (ESP)
- Lukas Orzeł (POL)
- Maksym Perepelytsya (UKR)
- Enrico Zero (ITA)

== Standings ==
Pos	Team	Pld	W	D	L	GF	GA	GD	Pts	Promotion
1	Spain (P)	6	4	1	1	31	14	+17	13	EuroHockey Indoor Championship
2	Poland (P)	6	4	1	1	28	18	+10	13	EuroHockey Indoor Championship
3	Croatia (P)	6	4	0	2	49	33	+16	12	EuroHockey Indoor Championship
4	Ukraine (P)	6	3	2	1	26	26	0	11	EuroHockey Indoor Championship
5	Portugal (H)	6	1	2	3	20	28	−8	5	
6	Turkey	6	0	3	3	24	33	−9	3	
7	Slovakia	6	0	1	5	20	46	−26	1	
8	Italy	0	0	0	0	0	0	0	0	Withdrew

Source: FIH
Rules for classification: 1) points; 2) matches won; 3) goal difference; 4) goals for; 5) head-to-head result; 6) field goals scored.
(H) Hosts; (P) Promoted

== Results ==
All times are local (UTC+0).

14 January 2022
11:00

Spain	1–1	Ukraine
Prol 12'	Report	Kalinchuk 4'

Umpires:
Lukasz Orzeł (POL)
Daniel Veerman (NED)

14 January 2022
12:15

Slovakia	5–6	Portugal
Kovačevič 3'; Petráš 6', 13', 34'; Jelačić 28'	Report	Franco 5', 14', 30'; Ribeiro 14', 37'; Santos 20'

Umpires:
Duran Bayram (TUR)
Pieter Hembrecht (NED)

14 January 2022
13:30

Poland	4–3	Turkey
Pawlak 18'; Gumny 21'; Kurowski 31'; Koperski 36'	Report	Öztürk 8'; Aydin 33', 37'

Umpires:
Lubos Kamendy (SVK)
Maksym Perepelytsya (UKR)

14 January 2022
15:00

Croatia	4–7	Spain
Zlimen 5'; A. Fujs 15'; Bachmann 17'; G. Fujs 29'	Report	Compta 5', 29'; Cid 8', 13', 13'; Rafi 21'; Curiel 39'

Umpires:
Paulo Lima (POR)
Pieter Hembrecht (NED)

14 January 2022
17:00

Portugal	2–3	Ukraine
Franco 10', 36'	Report	Luppa 6'; Shevchuk 21', 28'

Umpires:
Jorge Ocaña (ESP)
Lubos Kamendy (SVK)

14 January 2022
18:15

Turkey	5–5	Slovakia
Elagöz 2', 7', 22'; Aydin 31'; Ataş 32'	Report	Petráš 13', 27'; Jelačić 15'; Augustinič 22'; Kovačevič 38'

Umpires:
Lukas Orzeł (POL)
Maksym Perepelytsya (UKR)

14 January 2022
19:30

Poland	8–4	Croatia
Kurowski 23', 29'; Kasprzyk 25', 26'; Chumeńczuk 32'; P. Pawlak 33'; Gumny 34'; R. Pawlak 37'	Report	A. Fujs 11'; Mucić 13', 19'; Mesarić 38'

Umpires:
Duran Bayram (TUR)
David Sweetman (SCO)

15 January 2022
10:00

Turkey	5–8	Croatia
Aydin 18', 21'; Elagöz 23', 27', 30'	Report	Bachmann 2', 17', 34', 39'; A. Fujs 6'; Mucić 19', 34', 38'

Umpires:
David Sweetman (SCO)
Jorge Ocaña (ESP)

15 January 2022
11:15

Slovakia	2–9	Ukraine
Jelačić 7', 27'	Report	Onofriiuk 7', 32', 39'; Kalinchuk 13', 36'; Luppa 19'; Shevchuk 29', 34'; Kovalenko 37'

Umpires:
Daniel Veerman (NED)
Paulo Lima (POR)

15 January 2022
12:30

Spain	4–5	Poland
Muñoz 10', 12'; Cid 17'; Prol 34'	Report	Kurowski 3', 28'; Gumny 4'; Kasprzyk 23'; Nowakowski 26'

Umpires:
Duran Bayram (TUR)
Maksym Perepelytsya (UKR)

15 January 2022
14:00

Turkey	4–4	Portugal
Aydin 9', 15'; Elagöz 22', 32'	Report	Franco 8'; Castro 17'; Ribeiro 30', 33'

Umpires:
Pieter Hembrecht (NED)
Jorge Ocaña (ESP)

15 January 2022
16:00

Ukraine	4–13	Croatia
Koshelenko 27', 39'; Kalinchuk 28', 37'	Report	Bachmann 3', 40'; G. Fujs 5', 23'; A. Fujs 17', 18', 32'; Mucić 23', 39'; Krleža 25', 29'; Žlimen 37', 37'

Umpires:
Lubos Kamendy (SVK)
Lukasz Orzeł (POL)

15 January 2022
17:15

Slovakia	1–6	Poland
Bogar 29'	Report	Kurowski 5', 27'; Kasprzyk 6'; Sudoł 14', 25'; Gumny 27'

Umpires:
David Sweetman (SCO)
Paulo Lima (POR)

15 January 2022
18:30

Spain	5–2	Portugal
Prol 5', 40'; Clapes 5'; Compta 28'; Muñoz 31'	Report	Rodrigues 20+', 25'

Umpires:
Pieter Hembrecht (NED)
Daniel Veerman (NED)

16 January 2022
08:15

Poland	2–3	Ukraine
P. Pawlak 10'; R. Pawlak 11'	Report	Moroz 15'; Luppa 27'; Kovalenko 39'

Umpires:
Jorge Ocaña (ESP)
Daniel Veerman (NED)

16 January 2022
09:30

Turkey	1–6	Spain
Aydin 23'	Report	Curiel 5'; Cid 11', 18', 20', 31'; Cobos 40'

Umpires:
David Sweetman (SCO)
Lubos Kamendy (SVK)

16 January 2022
10:45

Croatia	12–6	Slovakia
G. Fujs 9'; Krleža 11'; Mucić 15', 24', 29', 32', 39'; A. Fujs 17', 23', 35'; Zec 40'; Mesarić 40'	Report	Petráš 3'; Kovačevič 10', 25', 35'; Bogar 21'; Garaj 39'

Umpires:
Pieter Hembrecht (NED)
Paulo Lima (POR)

16 January 2022
12:00

Poland	3–3	Portugal
Sudoł 20+', 26'; Kurowski 30'	Report	Ribeiro 22'; Franco 36'; Santos 39'

Umpires:
Duran Bayram (TUR)
Maksym Perepelytsya (UKR)

16 January 2022
13:15

Turkey	6–6	Ukraine
Özkiliç 2', 27'; Elagöz 10', 16'; Ataş 20', 31'	Report	Kalinchuk 2', 17', 32'; Diachuk 14'; Kovalenko 24'; Yasinskyi 30'

Umpires:
David Sweetman (SCO)
Lukasz Orzeł (POL)

16 January 2022
14:30

Slovakia	1–8	Spain
Krampl 18'	Report	Cobos 1', 35'; Zorita 10'; Compta 11', 40'; Muñoz 12', 35'; Alvarez-Villabol 39'

Umpires:
Daniel Veerman (NED)
Duran Bayram (TUR)

16 January 2022
15:45

Portugal	3–8	Croatia
Pinheiro 2'; Teixeira 7'; Almeida 19'	Report	Bachmann 4', 17'; A. Fujs 12'; Mucić 14', 34', 34'; G. Fujs 16'; Žlimen 30'

Umpires:
Lukasz Orzeł (POL)
Jorge Ocaña (ESP)

== Goalscorers ==
There were 198 goals scored in 21 matches, for an average of 9.43 goals per match.

15 goals

- (Croatia) Mario Mucić

10 goals

- (Croatia) Anže Fujs
- (Turkey) Müslüm Elagöz

9 goals

- (Croatia) Lucas Maximilian Bachmann

8 goals

- (Poland) Jacek Kurowski
- (Spain) Xurxo Cid
- (Ukraine) Vitalii Kalinchuk

7 goals

- (Portugal) David Franco
- (Turkey) Celal Aydin

6 goals

- (Slovakia) Daniel Petráš

5 goals

- (Croatia) Gregor Fujs
- (Portugal) Vasco Ribeiro
- (Slovakia) Zdenko Kovačevič
- (Spain) Pol Compta
- (Spain) Juan Muñoz

4 goals

- (Croatia) Filip Zlimen
- (Poland) Mikolaj Gumny
- (Poland) Michal Kasprzyk
- (Poland) Krystian Sudoł
- (Slovakia) Matej Jelačič
- (Spain) Manuel Prol
- (Ukraine) Vitalii Shevchuk

3 goals

- (Croatia) Josip Krleža
- (Poland) Patryk Pawlak
- (Spain) Ignacio Cobos
- (Turkey) Furkan Ataş
- (Ukraine) Bohdan Kovalenko
- (Ukraine) Dmytro Luppa
- (Ukraine) Maksym Onofriiuk

2 goals

- (Croatia) Luka Mesarić
- (Poland) Robert Pawlak
- (Portugal) Miguel Rodrigues
- (Portugal) José Santos
- (Slovakia) Juraj Bogar
- (Spain) Cesar Curiel
- (Turkey) Ali Akin Özkiliç
- (Ukraine) Andrii Koshelenko

1 goal

- (Croatia) Christopher Zec
- (Poland) Jakub Chumeńczuk
- (Poland) Maksymilian Koperski
- (Poland) Mateusz Nowakowski
- (Portugal) Rodrigo Castro
- (Slovakia) Adrian Augustinič
- (Slovakia) Richard Garaj
- (Slovakia) Matej Krampl
- (Spain) David Alvarez-Villabol
- (Spain) Gerard Clapes
- (Spain) Andreas Rafi
- (Spain) Enrique Zorita
- (Turkey) Furkan Özkiliç
- (Turkey) Halil Öztürk
- (Ukraine) Sergii Diachuk
- (Ukraine) Iurii Moroz
- (Ukraine) Mykhailo Yasinskyi

Source: FIH

== See also ==
- 2022 Men's EuroHockey Indoor Championship
- 2022 Men's EuroHockey Indoor Championship III
- 2022 Women's EuroHockey Indoor Championship II
