= Paul Dösch =

German field hockey player (born 1998)

Personal information
- Born: 11 May 1998 (age 28) Germany

Sport
- Sport: Field hockey
- Position: Defender
- Club: Berliner HC
Youth career
- Years: Team
- –2010: Berliner HC
- 2010–2014: Blau-Weiss Berlin
Senior career
Years	Team	Caps	Goals
2014–2019	Blau-Weiss Berlin	-	-
2019–present	Berliner HC	-	-
National team
Years	Team	Caps	Goals
2017–2019	Germany U21	17	-
2018–present	Germany (indoor)	16	(16)
2021–present	Germany	12	(1)
Medal record
Representing Germany
Men's field hockey
EuroHockey Junior Championship
Gold medal – first place	2019 Valencia
Bronze medal – third place	2017 Valencia
Men's indoor hockey
FIH Indoor World Cup
Gold medal – first place	2025 Poreč
EuroHockey Indoor Championship
Gold medal – first place	2020 Berlin
Gold medal – first place	2024 Leuven
Silver medal – second place	2022 Hamburg
Bronze medal – third place	2018 Antwerp

Paul Dösch (born 11 May 1998) is a German field hockey player who plays as a defender for Bundesliga club Berliner HC and the Germany national team.

== Club career ==
Dösch played in the youth ranks of Berliner HC until 2010, when he switched to Blau-Weiss Berlin. In 2019 he returned to Berliner HC.

== International career ==
=== Junior national team ===
Dösch made his debut for the German under-21 team in 2017. His first appearance was during a test series against the Netherlands in Mönchengladbach, Germany. Later that year he won a bronze medal with the junior team at the EuroHockey Junior Championship in Valencia, Spain.

His final year with the junior team was 2019. He made multiple appearances throughout the year, competing in numerous test matched and at an eight-nations tournament in Madrid, Spain. He finished his junior career on a high, winning gold at the EuroHockey Junior Championship in Valencia, Spain.

=== Die Honamas ===
Dösch made his debut for Die Honamas in 2021, during season two of the FIH Pro League.
