= Paul-Philipp Kaufmann =

German field hockey player

Personal information
- Born: 21 June 1996 (age 30) Mannheim, Germany
- Height: 1.79 m (5 ft 10 in)

Sport
- Sport: Field hockey
- Position: Midfielder
- Club: Hamburger Polo Club
Senior career
Years	Team	Caps	Goals
–2024	TSV Mannheim	-	-
2021–2024	Den Bosch	-	-
2024–present	Hamburger Polo Club	-	-
National team
Years	Team	Caps	Goals
2014–2017	Germany U21	16	(2)
2020–present	Germany	59	(6)
2024–present	Germany (indoor)	6	(2)
Medal record
Representing Germany
Men's field hockey
Olympic Games
Silver medal – second place	2024 Paris	Team
World Cup
Gold medal – first place	2026 Wavre/Amstelveen
EuroHockey Championships
Gold medal – first place	2025 Mönchengladbach
Silver medal – second place	2021 Amstelveen
EuroHockey Junior Championship
Bronze medal – third place	2017 Valencia
Men's indoor hockey
EuroHockey Indoor Championship
Gold medal – first place	2024 Leuven

Paul-Philipp Kaufmann (born 21 Juny 1996) is a German field hockey player who plays as a midfielder for Bundesliga club Hamburger Polo Club and the German national team.

== Club career ==
Kaufmann played for TSV Mannheim before he joined Den Bosch in the Netherlands for the 2021–22 season. After three years he returned to Germany to play for Hamburger Polo Club.
