= 2016 Men's EuroHockey Indoor Championship =

2016 Men's EuroHockey Indoor Nations Championship
Tournament details
- Host country: Czech Republic
- City: Prague
- Dates: 15–17 January
- Teams: 8 (from 1 confederation)
- Venue: Arena Sparta

Final positions
- Champions: Germany (15th title)
- Runner-up: Austria
- Third place: Russia

Tournament statistics
- Matches played: 20
- Goals scored: 129 (6.45 per match)
- Top scorer(s): (Germany) Timm Herzbruch (Austria) Michael Körper (11 goals)
- Best player: (Germany) Timm Herzbruch
- Best goalkeeper: (Germany) Andreas Späck

The 2016 Men's EuroHockey Indoor Championship was the eighteenth edition of the Men's EuroHockey Indoor Championship, the biennial international men's indoor hockey championship of Europe organized by the European Hockey Federation. It took place from 15 to 17 January 2016 in Prague, Czech Republic.

The two-time defending champions Germany won their 15th title by defeating Austria 3–2 in the final. Russia won the bronze medal by defeating the hosts the Czech Republic 4–3.

== Qualified teams ==
Dates	Event	Location	Quotas	Qualifiers
17–19 January 2014	2014 EuroHockey Indoor Championship	Vienna, Austria	7	Austria; Czech Republic; Germany; Netherlands; Poland; Russia; Sweden
17–19 January 2014	2014 EuroHockey Indoor Championship II	Bern, Switzerland	1	Switzerland
Total			8	

== Results ==
All times are local (UTC+1).

=== Preliminary round ===
==== Pool A ====
Pos	Team	Pld	W	D	L	GF	GA	GD	Pts	Qualification
1	Germany	3	3	0	0	19	8	+11	9	Semi-finals
2	Russia	3	2	0	1	12	10	+2	6	Semi-finals
3	Poland	3	1	0	2	5	9	−4	3	Relegation pool
4	Switzerland	3	0	0	3	5	14	−9	0	Relegation pool

Source: FIH

15 January 2016
10:00

Germany	4–1	Poland
Woesch 3'; Herzbruch 18', 25'; Schmid 36'	Report	Górny 38'

Umpires:
Lee Barron (ENG)
Jonas van't Hek (NED)

15 January 2016
11:10

Russia	4–1	Switzerland
Azarov 31'; Loginov 35'; Lykov 36'; Proskuriakov 38'	Report	Keller 22'

Umpires:
Nicklas Stenberg (SWE)
Oliver Tarnoczi (AUT)

15 January 2016
16:00

Poland	3–1	Switzerland
Górny 4', 36'; Makowski 14'	Report	Schwehr 7'

Umpires:
Jonas van't Hek (NED)
Nicklas Stenberg (SWE)

15 January 2016
17:10

Russia	4–8	Germany
Zhirkov 8'; Nikitin 12'; Mokrousov 23'; Lykov 39'	Report	Herzbruch 9', 11', 28', 36'; Schulz-Linkolt 25'; Schmid 30', 39'; Lietz 39'

Umpires:
Michael Soukup (CZE)
Oliver Tarnoczi (AUT)

16 January 2016
09:00

Germany	7–3	Switzerland
Weinke 9'; Herzbruch 10', 20'; Schulz-Linkolt 14'; Woesch 25'; Pehlke 29'; Ress 35'	Report	Greder 5'; Reinhard 29'; Wullschleger 37'

Umpires:
Oliver Tarnoczi (AUT)
Łukasz Zwierzchowski (POL)

16 January 2016
10:10

Poland	1–4	Russia
Majchrzak 18'	Report	Spichkovskii 10', 38'; Zhirkov 15'; Nikitin 40+'

Umpires:
Nicklas Stenberg (SWE)
Michael Soukup (CZE)

==== Pool B ====
Pos	Team	Pld	W	D	L	GF	GA	GD	Pts	Qualification
1	Austria	3	3	0	0	10	4	+6	9	Semi-finals
2	Czech Republic	3	2	0	1	8	6	+2	6	Semi-finals
3	Netherlands	3	1	0	2	7	6	+1	3	Relegation pool
4	Sweden	3	0	0	3	8	17	−9	0	Relegation pool

Source: FIH

15 January 2016
12:20

Netherlands	6–2	Sweden
Burkhardt 9', 25', 36'; Van Dam 17'; Kranstauber 34'; Tigges 39'	Report	Björkman 6'; A. Strøbye 10'

Umpires:
Mikhail Golovanov (RUS)
Joachim Wimmer (SUI)

15 January 2016
13:30

Austria	2–1	Czech Republic
Hasun 10'; Uher 36'	Report	Vacek 22'

Umpires:
Gregory Uyttenhove (BEL)
Johannes Berneth (GER)

15 January 2016
18:20

Netherlands	0–2	Austria
	Report	Körper 16', 40'

Umpires:
Lee Barron (ENG)
Łukasz Zwierzchowski (POL)

15 January 2016
19:30

Czech Republic	5–3	Sweden
Plochý 4'; Vudmaska 7'; Procházka 10'; Bernátek 23'; Kindl 26'	Report	Hemvik 17', 40'; A. Strøbye 28'

Umpires:
Joachim Wimmer (SUI)
Johannes Berneth (GER)

16 January 2016
11:20

Austria	6–3	Sweden
Körper 14', 18', 34', 36'; Uher 17'; Minar 26'	Report	Melander 13'; Rydborn 28'; Hellstrand 33'

Umpires:
Johannes Berneth (GER)
Mikhail Golovanov (RUS)

16 January 2016
12:30

Czech Republic	2–1	Netherlands
Bernátek 25'; Procházka 40+'	Report	Kranstauber 40'

Umpires:
Joachim Wimmer (SUI)
Gregory Uyttenhove (BEL)

=== Fifth to eighth place classification ===
==== Pool C ====
The points obtained in the preliminary round against the other team are taken over.

Pos	Team	Pld	W	D	L	GF	GA	GD	Pts	Relegation
5	Poland	3	2	1	0	16	5	+11	7	
6	Switzerland	3	2	0	1	8	7	+1	6	
7	Netherlands	3	1	1	1	8	7	+1	4	EuroHockey Indoor Championship II
8	Sweden	3	0	0	3	6	21	−15	0	EuroHockey Indoor Championship II

Source: FIH

16 January 2016
15:30

Switzerland	4–2	Sweden
Schwehr 9'; Keller 13'; Feller 19'; Greder 40'	Report	E. Strøbye 3'; Hemvik 30'

Umpires:
Mikhail Golovanov (RUS)
Łukasz Zwierzchowski (POL)

16 January 2016
16:40

Poland	2–2	Netherlands
Makowski 16', 37'	Report	Van Dam 11'; Wortelboer 33'

Umpires:
Johannes Berneth (GER)
Nicklas Stenberg (SWE)

17 January 2016
10:00

Netherlands	2–3	Switzerland
Bakker 5'; Tigges 40'	Report	Müller 11'; Keller 17'; Richner 37'

Umpires:
Oliver Tarnoczi (AUT)
Michael Soukup (CZE)

17 January 2016
11:10

Poland	11–2	Sweden
Górny 4', 17', 36'; Zimnicki 5'; Makowski 7', 12', 20+', 31', 39'; Majchrzak 26'; Bratkowski 29'	Report	Lundqvist 25'; A. Strøbye 34'

Umpires:
Joachim Wimmer (SUI)
Mikhail Golovanov (RUS)

=== First to fourth place classification ===
Semi-finals
16 January
Germany	5
Czech Republic	0
16 January
Austria (s.o.)	5 (3)
Russia	5 (1)

Final
17 January
Germany	3
Austria	2
Third place
17 January
Czech Republic	3
Russia	4

=== Semi-finals ===
16 January 2016
17:50

Austria	5–5	Russia
Minar 10'; Körper 20+', 33', 34'; Heimanns 25'	Report	Lykov 3'; Proskuriakov 18'; Azarov 27', 31'; Spichkovskii 30'
Penalties
Eitenberger (penalty shoot-out scored); Rudovsky (penalty shoot-out scored); Körper (penalty shoot-out scored)	3–1	(penalty shoot-out scored) Azarov; (penalty shoot-out missed) Spichkovskii

Umpires:
Michael Soukup (CZE)
Gregory Uyttenhove (BEL)

16 January 2016
19:15

Germany	5–0	Czech Republic
Woesch 28'; Herzbruch 31', 33'; Pehlke 39', 39'	Report

Umpires:
Lee Barron (ENG)
Jonas van't Hek (NED)

=== Third place game ===
17 January 2016
13:00

Russia	4–3	Czech Republic
Lykov 6'; Azarov 20'; Proskuriakov 36'; Zhirkov 39'	Report	Procházka 18'; Vacek 28', 33'

Umpires:
Łukasz Zwierzchowski (POL)
Gregory Uyttenhove (BEL)

=== Final ===
17 January 2016
14:30

Austria	2–3	Germany
Körper 16', 40+'	Report	Woesch 3'; Herzbruch 22'; Butt 24'

Umpires:
Lee Barron (ENG)
Jonas van't Hek (NED)

== Final standings ==
Pos	Team	Relegation
1	Germany	
2	Austria (H)	
3	Russia	
4	Czech Republic	
5	Poland	
6	Switzerland	
7	Netherlands	EuroHockey Indoor Championship II
8	Sweden	EuroHockey Indoor Championship II

Source: FIH
(H) Host
