= Hannes Müller =

German field hockey player

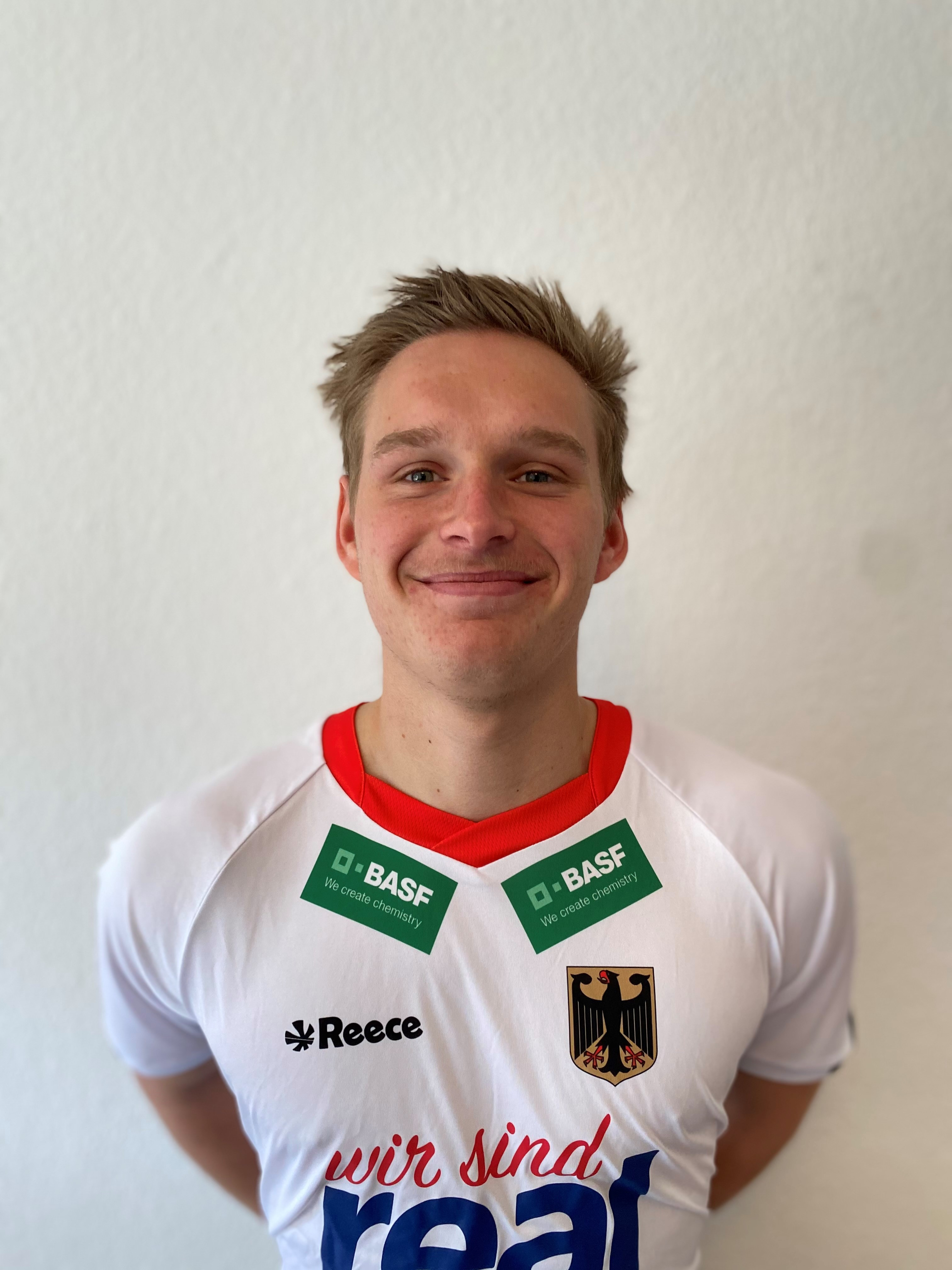
- Müller in 2021

Personal information
- Full name: Hannes Wulf Müller
- Born: 18 May 2000 (age 26) Köthen, Germany

Sport
- Sport: Field hockey
- Position: Midfield
- Club: Uhlenhorster HC
National team
Years	Team	Caps	Goals
2017–2021	Germany U21	23	(5)
2018–present	Germany	74	(3)
2018–present	Germany (indoor)	10	(10)
Medal record
Representing Germany
Men's field hockey
Olympic Games
Silver medal – second place	2024 Paris	Team
World Cup
Gold medal – first place	2023 Bhubaneswar/Rourkela
Gold medal – first place	2026 Wavre/Amstelveen
EuroHockey Championships
Gold medal – first place	2025 Mönchengladbach
Junior World Cup
Silver medal – second place	2021 Bhubaneswar
EuroHockey Junior Championship
Gold medal – first place	2019 Valencia
Bronze medal – third place	2017 Valencia
Men's indoor hockey
EuroHockey Indoor Championship
Gold medal – first place	2020 Berlin
Bronze medal – third place	2018 Antwerp
- Updated on 12:26, 24 June 2025 (UTC)

Hannes Wulf Müller (born 18 May 2000) is a German field hockey player.

== Career ==
=== Club level ===
In club competition, Müller plays for Uhlenhorster HC in the German Bundesliga.

=== Junior national team ===
Hannes Müller made his debut for the German U–21 team in 2017. His first appearance was during a test series against Russia in Frankfurt. He went on to win a bronze medal at the EuroHockey Junior Championship in Valencia later that year.

Müller represented the side again in 2019 at an invitational tournament in Madrid, as well as the EuroHockey Junior Championship in Valencia, where he won a gold medal.

In 2021, alongside Benedikt Schwarzhaupt, Müller captained the team at the FIH Junior World Cup in Bhubaneswar. At the tournament, Germany won a silver medal.

=== Die Honamas ===
Hannes Müller made his debut for Die Honamas in 2018 during a test series against Ireland in Dublin.

He returned to the senior squad in 2021 during season two of the FIH Pro League.
