= 2022 Men's EuroHockey Indoor Championship =

Tournament details
- Host country: Germany
- City: Hamburg
- Dates: 8–11 December
- Teams: 6 (from 1 confederation)
- Venue: Alsterdorfer Sporthalle

Final positions
- Champions: Austria (3rd title)
- Runner-up: Germany
- Third place: Netherlands

Tournament statistics
- Matches played: 18
- Goals scored: 191 (10.61 per match)
- Top scorer: (Belgium) Philippe Simar (20 goals)

The 2022 Men's EuroHockey Indoor Championship was the twentieth edition of the Men's EuroHockey Indoor Championship, the biennial international men's indoor hockey championship of Europe organized by the European Hockey Federation.

It was originally planned to be held alongside the women's tournament from 12 to 16 January 2022 at the Alsterdorfer Sporthalle in Hamburg, Germany. However on 22 December 2021, the tournament was postponed to 8 to 11 December 2022 due to the COVID-19 pandemic in Europe.

Austria won their third title by defeating the hosts and defending champions Germany 2–1 in the final. The Netherlands won the bronze medal after defeating Switzerland 10–3.

== Qualified teams ==
Participating nations have qualified based on their final ranking from the 2020 competition.

Dates	Event	Location	Quotas	Qualifiers
17–19 January 2020	2020 EuroHockey Indoor Championship	Berlin, Germany	5	Austria; Belgium; Czech Republic; Germany; Netherlands; ~~Russia~~ (Note: Belarus and Russia are excluded from the tournament due to their involvement in the 2022 Russian invasion of Ukraine.)
17–19 January 2020	2020 EuroHockey Indoor Championship II	Lucerne, Switzerland	1	~~Belarus~~; Switzerland
Total			6	

== Preliminary round ==
=== Pool ===
Pos	Team	Pld	W	D	L	GF	GA	GD	Pts	Qualification
1	Austria	5	4	0	1	30	22	+8	12	Final
2	Germany (H)	5	3	1	1	38	25	+13	10	Final
3	Netherlands	5	3	1	1	35	24	+11	10	Third place game
4	Switzerland	5	1	2	2	26	34	−8	5	Third place game
5	Belgium	5	1	1	3	18	25	−7	4	Fifth place game
6	Czech Republic	5	0	1	4	12	29	−17	1	Fifth place game

Source: FIH
Rules for classification: 1) points; 2) matches won; 3) goal difference; 4) goals for; 5) head-to-head result; 6) field goals scored.
(H) Hosts

8 December 2022
09:30

Czech Republic	2–8	Netherlands
Plochý 10'; Seemann 32'	Report	Campbell 2'; Sweering 12', 19'; Schut 17', 36'; Bakker 30', 30'; Burkhardt 39'

Umpires:
Sean Edwards (ENG)
Ole Ingwersen (GER)

8 December 2022
10:45

Austria	9–5	Switzerland
Binder 7', 12', 32'; Körper 13', 19', 20', 23', 39'; Unterkircher 35'	Report	Stomps 2', 39'; Y. Morard 10', 39'; Greder 40'

Umpires:
Antonio Ilgrande (ITA)
Laurent Dooms (BEL)

8 December 2022
12:00

Germany	4–4	Belgium
Bruns 10'; Schmid 33'; Dösch 35'; Mertgens 39'	Report	G. Dykmans 5'; Simar 11', 12', 20'

Umpires:
Jakub Mejzlik (CZE)
Benjamin Messerli (SUI)

8 December 2022
17:00

Switzerland	5–5	Czech Republic
Y. Morard 13'; Gassner 31'; Wyss-Chodat 36'; M. Morard 38'; Greder 40'	Report	Procházka 16', 25'; Plochý 18', 24', 37'

Umpires:
Pieter Hembrecht (NED)
Antonio Ilgrande (ITA)

8 December 2022
18:15

Austria	6–2	Belgium
Körper 9', 16'; Unterkircher 23', 29', 31'; Eitenberger 28'	Report	A. Dykmans 18'; Simar 24'

Umpires:
Sean Edwards (ENG)
Benjamin Messerli (SUI)

8 December 2022
19:30

Germany	6–5	Netherlands
Bruns 8'; Mertgens 12'; Dösch 21', 34', 40'; Struthoff 29'	Report	Bakker 4'; Middendorp 26'; Hertzberger 37'; Campbell 39'; Burkhardt 39'

Umpires:
Jakub Mejzlik (CZE)
Laurent Dooms (BEL)

9 December 2022
13:15

Switzerland	8–13	Germany
Marelli 1'; Y. Morard 4', 30', 38'; Wyss-Chodat 8'; Greder 10', 32'; Gassner 35'	Report	Bruns 4', 25', 34'; Mertgens 13'; Schmid 16', 24'; Struthoff 20', 30+'; Dösch 22', 39'; Holste 26'; Lehmann-Richter 34'; Boeckel 40'

Umpires:
Pieter Hembrecht (NED)
Jakub Mejzlik (CZE)

9 December 2022
14:30

Netherlands	10–7	Belgium
Sweering 14', 27', 35'; Van Battum 22'; Burkhardt 30', 40'; Hertzberger 33'; Tukkers 34'; Bakker 38', 40'	Report	Simar 4', 11', 18', 21', 29'; G. Dykmans 13', 40'

Umpires:
Antonio Ilgrande (ITA)
Sean Edwards (ENG)

9 December 2022
15:45

Czech Republic	2–4	Austria
Trejbal 3'; Seeman 32'	Report	Körper 1', 10', 26'; Binder 9'

Umpires:
Ole Ingwersen (GER)
Benjamin Messerli (SUI)

10 December 2022
09:00

Netherlands	5–5	Switzerland
Schut 15'; Bakker 20', 30'; Sweering 26'; Burkhardt 33'	Report	Greder 6'; Brönnimann 7'; Gassner 25'; Wyss-Chodat 35'; M. Morard 38'

Umpires:
Laurent Dooms (BEL)
Jakub Mejzlik (CZE)

10 December 2022
10:15

Belgium	3–2	Czech Republic
Simar 12', 13', 19'	Report	Plochý 13'; Klaban 35'

Umpires:
Benjamin Messerli (SUI)
Ole Ingwersen (GER)

10 December 2022
11:30

Germany	6–7	Austria
Dösch 1'; Mertgens 16', 27', 29'; Schmid 25'; Bruns 39'	Report	Unterkircher 8', 38'; Körper 13', 36', 39', 40'; Frey 16'

Umpires:
Pieter Hembrecht (NED)
Seab Edwards (ENG)

10 December 2022
18:15

Czech Republic	1–9	Germany
Plochý 34'	Report	Mertgens 7'; Bruns 8', 36'; Schmid 10'; Holste 12', 33'; Dösch 13'; Lehmann-Richter 27'; Struthoff 29'

Umpires:
Laurent Dooms (BEL)
Antonio Ilgrande (ITA)

10 December 2022
19:30

Austria	4–7	Netherlands
Eitenberger 13', 17'; Thörnblom 32'; Unterkircher 38'	Report	Burkhardt 7', 39'; Bakker 9', 15', 17'; Campbell 26'; Hertzberger 35'

Umpires:
Jakub Mejzlik (CZE)
Ole Ingwersen (GER)

10 December 2022
20:45

Belgium	2–3	Switzerland
Magnant 17'; Simar 38'	Report	Stomps 9', 21'; Greder 26'

Umpires:
Pieter Hembrecht (NED)
Sean Edwards (ENG)

== Classification round ==
=== Fifth place game ===
11 December 2022
11:00

Belgium	9–7	Czech Republic
Simar 2', 12', 20', 28', 32', 38', 40'; Magnant 16'; Englebert 33'	Report	Plochý 5', 21', 36', 40'; Klaban 15'; O. Soukup 26'; Vacek 27'

Umpires:
Pieter Hembrecht (NED)
Benjamin Messerli (SUI)

=== Third place game ===
11 December 2022
12:30

Netherlands	10–3	Switzerland
Burkhardt 7', 27'; Schut 14'; Bakker 15', 33'; Sweering 16', 25', 30'; Leijs 17'; Tukkers 29'	Report	Greder 18'; Reinhard 23'; M. Morard 32'

Umpires:
Ole Ingwersen (GER)
Laurent Dooms (BEL)

=== Final ===
11 December 2022
14:00

Austria	2–1	Germany
Unterkircher 18', 39'	Report	Dösch 10'

Umpires:
Sean Edwards (ENG)
Antonio Ilgrande (ITA)

== Statistics ==
=== Final standings ===
1. Austria
2. Germany
3. Netherlands
4. Switzerland
5. Belgium
6. Czech Republic

=== Goalscorers ===
There were 191 goals scored in 18 matches, for an average of 10.6 goals per match.

20 goals

- (Belgium) Philippe Simar

14 goals

- (Austria) Michael Körper

12 goals

- (Netherlands) Jochem Bakker

10 goals

- (Czech Republic) Lukas Plochý

9 goals

- (Austria) Fabian Unterkircher
- (Germany) Paul Dösch
- (Netherlands) Boris Burkhardt
- (Netherlands) Max Sweering

8 goals

- (Germany) Niklas Bruns

7 goals

- (Germany) Henrik Mertgens
- (Switzerland) Martin Greder

6 goals

- (Switzerland) Yves Morard

5 goals

- (Germany) Philip Schmid

4 goals

- (Austria) Oliver Binder
- (Germany) Michel Struthoff
- (Netherlands) Wiegert Schut
- (Switzerland) Boris Stomps

3 goals

- (Austria) Sebastian Eitenberger
- (Belgium) Gaetan Dykmans
- (Germany) Luis Holste
- (Netherlands) Jeroen Hertzberger
- (Switzerland) Lorenz Gassner
- (Switzerland) Michel Morard
- (Switzerland) Gaël Wyss-Chodat

2 goals

- (Belgium) Mallory Magnant
- (Czech Republic) Štěpán Klaban
- (Czech Republic) Tomas Procházka
- (Czech Republic) Martin Seeman
- (Germany) Adrian Lehmann-Richter
- (Netherlands) Jasper Tukkers

1 goal

- (Austria) Moritz Frey
- (Austria) Leon Thörnblom
- (Belgium) Arnaud Dykmans
- (Belgium) Dylan Englebert
- (Czech Republic) Ondrej Soukup
- (Czech Republic) Josef Trejbal
- (Czech Republic) David Vacek
- (Germany) Anton Boeckel
- (Netherlands) Nicki Leijs
- (Netherlands) Lucas Middendorp
- (Netherlands) Bram van Battum
- (Switzerland) Elias Brönnimann
- (Switzerland) Fabio Reinhard
- (Switzerland) Fabio Marelli

Source: FIH

== See also ==
- 2022 Men's EuroHockey Indoor Championship II
- 2022 Women's EuroHockey Indoor Championship
