= 2024 Men's EuroHockey Indoor Championship =

Indoor hockey championship in Belgium

Tournament details
- Host country: Belgium
- City: Leuven
- Dates: 1–4 February
- Teams: 10 (from 1 confederation)
- Venue: Sportoase

Final positions
- Champions: Germany (17th title)
- Runner-up: Poland
- Third place: Belgium

Tournament statistics
- Matches played: 29
- Goals scored: 271 (9.34 per match)
- Top scorer(s): (Austria) Fülöp Losonci (Spain) Ignacio Abajo (12 goals)
- Best player: (Croatia) Anže Fujs
- Best goalkeeper: (Belgium) Matteo Gryspeerdt

The 2024 Men's EuroHockey Indoor Championship was the 21st edition of the Men's EuroHockey Indoor Championship, the biennial international indoor hockey championship of Europe for men organized by the European Hockey Federation.

The tournament was held from 1 to 4 February 2024 at the Sportoase in Leuven, Belgium. This was the first edition with ten teams. The top four teams qualified for the 2025 Men's FIH Indoor Hockey World Cup.

Germany won a record-extending 17th title by defeating Poland 5–2 in the final. The hosts Belgium won the bronze medal by defeating the defending champions Austria 7–6.

== Qualified teams ==
Participating nations qualified based on their final ranking from the 2022 competition.

Dates	Event	Location	Quotas	Qualifiers
8–11 December 2023	2022 EuroHockey Indoor Championship	Hamburg, Germany	5	Austria; Belgium; Czech Republic; Germany; ~~Netherlands~~ (Note: The Netherlands withdrew on 29 September 2023 because of the overcrowded international hockey calendar.); Switzerland
14–16 January 2022	2022 EuroHockey Indoor Championship II	Paredes, Portugal	5	Croatia; Poland; Portugal; Spain; Ukraine
Total			10	

== Preliminary round ==
All times are local (UTC+1).

=== Pool A ===
Pos	Team	Pld	W	D	L	GF	GA	GD	Pts	Qualification or relegation
1	Austria	4	3	1	0	23	17	+6	10	Qualification for the semi-finals and the 2025 Indoor World Cup
2	Germany	4	2	1	1	23	19	+4	7	Qualification for the semi-finals and the 2025 Indoor World Cup
3	Spain	4	2	0	2	22	23	−1	6	
4	Switzerland	4	2	0	2	19	22	−3	6	
5	Croatia (R)	4	0	0	4	23	29	−6	0	Relegation to the Indoor Championship II

Source: FIH
Rules for classification: 1) points; 2) matches won; 3) goal difference; 4) goals for; 5) head-to-head result; 6) field goals for.
(R) Relegated

1 February 2024
10:00

Austria	6–4	Croatia
Unterkircher 14', 29', 33'; Stanzl 19'; Eitenberger 25'; Losonci 36'	Report	Bachmann 7', 34', 38'; Mucić 35'

Umpires:
Ben Goentgen (GER)
Daniel Rodriguez (ESP)

1 February 2024
11:15

Germany	6–2	Spain
Mazkour 4', 9', 33'; Mertgens 10', 12'; Kaufmann 30'	Report	Cobos 16'; Prol 24'

Umpires:
Antonio Ilgrande (ITA)
Alex Fedenczuk (SCO)

1 February 2024
16:00

Spain	8–6	Croatia
Abajo 3', 19', 25', 40'; Curiel 13'; Muñoz 15'; Cobos 18'; Sanz 34'	Report	A. Fujs 6'; Bachmann 9', 19'; Mucić 16'; G. Fujs 27', 30'

Umpires:
Michael Pontus (BEL)
Michelle Meister (GER)

1 February 2024
17:15

Switzerland	2–4	Austria
Stomps 32'; Hengartner 39'	Report	Losonci 3', 19'; Kelner 33'; Stanzl 36'

Umpires:
Ben Goentgen (GER)
Jakub Mejzlik (CZE)

2 February 2024
10:00

Switzerland	3–6	Spain
Reinhard 11'; Stomps 18'; Morard 26'	Report	Muñoz 8'; Abajo 10', 12'; Cobos 20'; Zorita 29', 35'

Umpires:
Jakub Mejzlik (CZE)
Céline Martin-Schmets (BEL)

2 February 2024
11:15

Germany	7–6	Croatia
Staib 4', 15', 23', 34'; Mertgens 18'; Lehmann-Richter 28'; Mazkour 31'	Report	Bachmann 3'; Jazbec 4', 39'; A. Fujs 8'; Mucić 13', 29'

Umpires:
Pieter Hembrecht (NED)
Alex Fedenczuk (SCO)

2 February 2024
16:00

Croatia	7–8	Switzerland
A. Fujs 7'; Bachmann 8', 37', 39'; Mucić 11', 12'; Krleža 38'	Report	Grandchamp 20', 22'; Stomps 20', 27', 29', 40'; Hengartner 24'; Reinhard 37'

Umpires:
Daniel Rodriguez (ESP)
Alex Fedenczuk (SCO)

2 February 2024
17:15

Germany	5–5	Austria
Staib 1'; Kleinlein 3'; Dösch 17'; Mertgens 22'; Kaufmann 36'	Report	Stanzl 17', 28', 30'; Unterkircher 31'; Fröhlich 39'

Umpires:
Antonio Ilgrande (ITA)
Jakub Mejzlik (CZE)

3 February 2024
09:00

Switzerland	6–5	Germany
Reinhard 3'; Landtwing 4'; Stomps 7', 18'; Grandchamp 25', 39'	Report	Kleinlein 1'; Mertgens 5', 32'; Dösch 8'; Mazkour 33'

Umpires:
Daniel Rodriguez (ESP)
Céline Martin-Schmets (BEL)

3 February 2024
10:15

Austria	8–6	Spain
Unterkircher 2', 13', 37'; Losonci 11', 19', 22', 27', 35'	Report	Rodriguez 5', 33'; Abajo 29', 39', 40'; Muñoz 33'

Umpires:
Vilma Bagdanskiene (LTU)
Antonio Ilgrande (ITA)

=== Pool B ===
Pos	Team	Pld	W	D	L	GF	GA	GD	Pts	Qualification or relegation
1	Belgium (H)	4	3	0	1	22	11	+11	9	Qualification for the semi-finals and the 2025 Indoor World Cup
2	Poland	4	2	0	2	17	16	+1	6	Qualification for the semi-finals and the 2025 Indoor World Cup
3	Portugal	4	2	0	2	14	20	−6	6	
4	Czech Republic	4	1	1	2	19	18	+1	4	
5	Ukraine (R)	4	1	1	2	13	20	−7	4	Relegation to the Indoor Championship II

Source: FIH
Rules for classification: 1) points; 2) matches won; 3) goal difference; 4) goals for; 5) head-to-head result; 6) field goals for.
(H) Hosts; (R) Relegated

1 February 2024
12:30

Czech Republic	4–4	Ukraine
Uhlíř 18'; Plochý 36', 38'; Seemann 38'	Report	Kalinchuk 1', 34'; Kovalenko 13'; Luppa 37'

Umpires:
Vilma Bagdanskiene (LTU)
Michael Pontus (BEL)

1 February 2024
13:45

Belgium	4–2	Portugal
Simar 14', 23', 30'; Magnant 33'	Report	Santos 15'; L. Halfmann 23'

Umpires:
Jakub Mejzlik (CZE)
Pieter Hembrecht (NED)

1 February 2024
18:30

Ukraine	1–4	Portugal
Zhmereniuk 15'	Report	Castro 10', 40'; L. Halfmann 14', 16'

Umpires:
Céline Martin-Schmets (BEL)
Pieter Hembrecht (NED)

1 February 2024
19:45

Poland	4–2	Belgium
Jarzyński 9', 10', 16', 40'	Report	Simar 3'; Hermans 17'

Umpires:
Vilma Bagdanskiene (LTU)
Antonio Ilgrande (ITA)

2 February 2024
12:30

Czech Republic	10–2	Portugal
V. Soukup 10', 30', 39'; Seemann 16', 38'; Plochý 16', 18', 20'; Toms 19', 40'	Report	L. Halfmann 13'; Santos 35'

Umpires:
Michael Pontus (BEL)
Daniel Rodriguez (ESP)

2 February 2024
13:45

Poland	4–5	Ukraine
Gumny 6'; Hulboj 9'; Jarzyński 13'; P. Pawlak 18'	Report	Kalinchuk 11', 20', 37'; Koshelenko 30'; Kovalenko 36'

Umpires:
Michelle Meister (GER)
Vilma Bagdanskiene (LTU)

2 February 2024
18:30

Portugal	6–5	Poland
Ribeiro 14', 16'; Q. Halfmann 17', 19'; Santos 34'; Castro 40'	Report	Gumny 27'; Hulboj 29'; P. Pawlak 33'; Jarzyński 38'; Kurowski 39'

Umpires:
Ben Goentgen (GER)
Céline Martin-Schmets (BEL)

2 February 2024
19:45

Czech Republic	2–8	Belgium
Toms 2'; V. Soukup 11'	Report	Simar 13', 19', 20', 23', 30', 39'; Hermans 36'; Magnant 40'

Umpires:
Michelle Meister (GER)
Pieter Hembrecht (NED)

3 February 2024
11:30

Poland	4–3	Czech Republic
Hulboj 5', 33'; Jarzyński 20', 39'	Report	Tomeš 8'; Kolar 28'; V. Soukup 40'

Umpires:
Michael Pontus (BEL)
Ben Goentgen (GER)

3 February 2024
12:45

Belgium	8–3	Ukraine
Langer 6', 22'; Dykmans 24', 34', 36'; Magnant 33', 39'; Hawaux 40'	Report	Kalinchuk 8', 14'; Luppa 40'

Umpires:
Alex Fedenczuk (SCO)
Michelle Meister (GER)

== Ninth to tenth place classification ==
=== Ninth and tenth place ===
3 February 2024
21:25

Croatia	6–4	Ukraine
Bachmann 9', 17'; Mucić 19'; Jazbec 20'; A. Fujs 32'; Žlimen 36'	Report	Kalinchuk 10', 30'; Koshelenko 13'; Kovalenko 25'

Umpires:
Daniel Rodriguez (ESP)
Vilma Bagdanskiene (LTU)

== Fifth to eighth place classification ==
=== Bracket ===
Semi-finals
3 February
Spain (s.o.)	3 (2)
Czech Republic	3 (0)
3 February
Portugal	5 (2)
Switzerland (s.o.)	5 (3)

Fifth place
4 February
Spain	3
Switzerland	1
Seventh place
4 February
Czech Republic	5
Portugal	10

=== Semi-finals ===
3 February 2024
15:45

Spain	3–3	Czech Republic
Abajo 11', 20'; Prol 33'	Report	Seemann 9'; Toms 23'; Uhlíř 40'
Penalties
Abajo (penalty shoot-out scored); Rodriguez (penalty shoot-out scored)	2–0	(penalty shoot-out missed) Seemann; (penalty shoot-out missed) Plochý

Umpires:
Pieter Hembrecht (NED)
Michael Pontus (BEL)

3 February 2024
17:10

Portugal	5–5	Switzerland
Santos 5'; Franco 6'; L. Halfmann 10'; Ribeiro 15'; Q. Halfmann 23'	Report	Grandchamp 3', 16', 36'; Stomps 26'; Morard 29'
Penalties
Q. Halfmann (penalty shoot-out scored); L. Halfmann (penalty shoot-out missed); Franco (penalty shoot-out scored); L. Halfmann (penalty shoot-out missed); Franco (penalty shoot-out missed); Q. Halfmann (penalty shoot-out missed)	2–3	(penalty shoot-out scored) Stomps; (penalty shoot-out missed) Grandchamp; (penalty shoot-out scored) Morard; (penalty shoot-out missed) Stomps; (penalty shoot-out missed) Morard; (penalty shoot-out scored) Grandchamp

Umpires:
Céline Martin-Schmets (BEL)
Alex Fedenczuk (SCO)

=== Seventh and eighth place ===
4 February 2024
09:30

Czech Republic	5–10	Portugal
Plochý 27', 31'; Toms 36'; V. Soukup 38'; Seemann 40'	Report	Ribeiro 2', 30'; Franco 4', 9', 23', 34'; L. Halfmann 10'; Castro 13', 19', 31'

Umpires:
Céline Martin-Schmets (BEL)
Antonio Ilgrande (ITA)

=== Fifth and sixth place ===
4 February 2024
11:00

Spain	3–1	Switzerland
Prol 12'; Muñoz 27'; Abajo 29'	Report	Morard 31'

Umpires:
Michelle Meister (GER)
Jakub Mejzlik (CZE)

== First to fourth place classification ==
=== Bracket ===
Semi-finals
3 February
Austria	1 (2)
Poland (s.o.)	1 (3)
3 February
Belgium	4
Germany	5

Final
4 February
Poland	2
Germany	5
Third place
4 February
Austria	6
Belgium	7

=== Semi-finals ===
3 February 2024
18:35

Belgium	4–5	Germany
Dykmans 4'; Hawaux 26'; Langer 27'; Magnant 30'	Report	Staib 6', 20'; Lehmann-Richter 29'; Kleinlein 33'; Mertgens 40'

Umpires:
Ben Goentgen (GER)
Michelle Meister (GER)

3 February 2024
20:00

Austria	1–1	Poland
Losonci 13'	Report	Lewartowski 36'
Penalties
Losonci (penalty shoot-out scored); Unterkircher (penalty shoot-out missed); Eitenberger (penalty shoot-out scored); Losonci (penalty shoot-out missed)	2–3	(penalty shoot-out missed) P. Pawlak; (penalty shoot-out scored) R. Pawlak; (penalty shoot-out scored) Jarzyński; (penalty shoot-out scored) R. Pawlak

Umpires:
Antonio Ilgrande (ITA)
Jakub Mejzlik (CZR)

=== Third and fourth place ===
4 February 2024
12:30

Austria	6–7	Belgium (bronze)
Losonci 3', 39', 40'; Unterkircher 5', 26', 28'	Report	Langer 8', 20', 34', 39'; Dykmans 23', 30'; Bogaerts 28'

Umpires:
Ben Goentgen (GER)
Alex Fedenczuk (SCO)

=== Final ===
4 February 2024
14:00

(silver) Poland	2–5	Germany (gold)
Jarzyński 20'; P. Pawlak 22'	Report	Dösch 14', 27'; Mazkour 20', 25'; Mertgens 31'

Umpires:
Pieter Hembrecht (NED)
Michael Pontus (BEL)

== Statistics ==
=== Final standings ===
Pos	Team	Qualification or relegation
1st place, gold medalist(s)	Germany	Qualification for the 2025 Indoor World Cup
2nd place, silver medalist(s)	Poland	Qualification for the 2025 Indoor World Cup
3rd place, bronze medalist(s)	Belgium (H)	Qualification for the 2025 Indoor World Cup
4	Austria	Qualification for the 2025 Indoor World Cup
5	Spain	
6	Switzerland	
7	Portugal	
8	Czech Republic	
9	Croatia (R)	Relegation to the Indoor Championship II
10	Ukraine (R)	Relegation to the Indoor Championship II

Source: FIH
(H) Host; (R) Relegated

=== Goalscorers ===
There were 271 goals scored in 29 matches, for an average of 9.34 goals per match.

12 goals

- (Austria) Fülöp Losonci
- (Spain) Ignacio Abajo

11 goals

- (Croatia) Lucas Maximilian Bachmann

10 goals

- (Austria) Fabian Unterkircher
- (Belgium) Philippe Simar

9 goals

- (Poland) Gracjan Jarzyński
- (Switzerland) Boris Stomps
- (Ukraine) Vitalii Kalinchuk

8 goals

- (Germany) Henrik Mertgens

7 goals

- (Belgium) Maximilian Langer
- (Croatia) Mario Mucić
- (Czech Republic) Lukas Plochý
- (Germany) Elian Mazkour
- (Germany) Constantin Staib
- (Switzerland) Loris Grandchamp

6 goals

- (Belgium) Gaetan Dykmans
- (Czech Republic) Vít Soukup
- (Portugal) Rodrigo Castro
- (Portugal) Laurens Halfmann

5 goals

- (Austria) Benjamin Stanzl
- (Belgium) Mallory Magnant
- (Czech Republic) Martin Seemann
- (Czech Republic) Josef Toms
- (Portugal) David Franco
- (Portugal) Vasco Ribeiro

4 goals

- (Croatia) Anže Fujs
- (Germany) Paul Dösch
- (Poland) Mateusz Hulboj
- (Portugal) José Santos
- (Spain) Juan Muñoz

3 goals

- (Croatia) Josip Jazbec
- (Germany) Erik Kleinlein
- (Poland) Patryk Pawlak
- (Portugal) Quentin Halfmann
- (Spain) Ignacio Cobos
- (Spain) Manuel Prol
- (Switzerland) Michel Morard
- (Switzerland) Fabio Reinhard
- (Ukraine) Bohdan Kovalenko

2 goals

- (Belgium) Guerlain Hawaux
- (Belgium) Cyril Hermans
- (Croatia) Gregor Fujs
- (Czech Republic) Adam Uhlíř
- (Germany) Paul-Philipp Kaufmann
- (Germany) Adrian Lehmann-Richter
- (Poland) Mikolaj Gumny
- (Spain) Manuel Rodriguez
- (Spain) Enrique Zorita
- (Switzerland) Lukas Hengartner
- (Ukraine) Andrii Koshelenko
- (Ukraine) Dmytro Luppa

1 goal

- (Austria) Sebastian Eitenberger
- (Austria) Daniel Fröhlich
- (Austria) Maximilian Kelner
- (Belgium) Nicolas Bogaerts
- (Croatia) Josip Krleža
- (Croatia) Filip Žlimen
- (Czech Republic) Vojtech Kolar
- (Czech Republic) Denis Tomeš
- (Poland) Jacek Kurowski
- (Poland) Marcin Lewartowski
- (Spain) Cesar Curiel
- (Spain) Antonio Sanz
- (Switzerland) Fabio Landtwing
- (Ukraine) Volodymyr Zhmereniuk

Source: FIH

== See also ==
- 2024 Men's EuroHockey Indoor Club Cup
- 2024 Women's EuroHockey Indoor Championship
