= 2020 Men's EuroHockey Indoor Championship =

Tournament details
- Host country: Germany
- City: Berlin
- Dates: 17–19 January
- Teams: 8 (from 1 confederation)
- Venue(s): Horst-Korber-Sportzentrum

Final positions
- Champions: Germany (16th title)
- Runner-up: Austria
- Third place: Netherlands

Tournament statistics
- Matches played: 20
- Goals scored: 183 (9.15 per match)
- Top scorer(s): (Netherlands) Boris Burkhardt (Austria) Michael Körper (11 goals)

The 2020 Men's EuroHockey Indoor Championship was the nineteenth edition of the Men's EuroHockey Indoor Championship, the biennial international men's indoor hockey championship of Europe organized by the European Hockey Federation. It took place from 17 to 19 January 2020 in Berlin, Germany.

The hosts Germany won their sixteenth title by defeating the defending champions Austria 6–3 in the final. The Netherlands won the bronze medal by defeating Russia 11–3.

== Qualified teams ==
Dates	Event	Location	Quotas	Qualifiers
12–14 January 2018	2018 EuroHockey Indoor Championship	Antwerp, Belgium	6	Austria (1); Belgium (7); Czech Republic (3); Germany (2); Poland (5); Russia (6)
12–14 January 2018	2018 EuroHockey Indoor Championship II	Alanya, Turkey	2	Netherlands (9); Ukraine (19)
Total			8	

== Format ==
The eight teams will be split into two groups of four teams. The top two teams advance to the semifinals to determine the winner in a knockout system. The bottom two teams play in a new group with the teams they did not play against in the group stage. The last two teams will be relegated to the EuroHockey Indoor Nations Championship II.

== Results ==
All times are local (UTC+1).

=== Preliminary round ===
The Pools were decided in summer 2019 following the FIH Indoor World Ranking.

==== Pool A ====
Pos	Team	Pld	W	D	L	GF	GA	GD	Pts	Qualification
1	Austria	3	3	0	0	16	7	+9	9	Semi-finals
2	Russia	3	2	0	1	13	12	+1	6	Semi-finals
3	Poland	3	1	0	2	12	14	−2	3	Relegation pool
4	Ukraine	3	0	0	3	8	16	−8	0	Relegation pool

Source: FIH

17 January 2020
10:00

Poland	5–4	Ukraine
Kasprzyk 5', 13'; Hulboj 8', 10', 32'	Report	Kalinchuk 4', 5'; Diachuk 17'; Koshlenko 31'

Umpires:
Ben Goentgen (GER)
Fraser Bell (SCO)

17 January 2020
11:15

Austria	5–3	Russia
Unterkircher 7', 31'; Körper 22'; Stanzl 26'; Bele 37'	Report	Kuraev 2'; Arusiia 9'; Khairullin 16'

Umpires:
Michael Pontus (BEL)
Antonio Ilgrande (ITA)

17 January 2020
16:00

Russia	5–3	Ukraine
Artemov 3'; Kuraev 15'; Nadyrshin 20', 31'; Khairullin 28'	Report	Kalinchuk 4', 8'; Yasinskyi 17'

Umpires:
Sean Edwards (ENG)
Lukasz Zwierzchowski (POL)

17 January 2020
17:15

Poland	3–5	Austria
Hulboj 10', 25'; Kasprzyk 37'	Report	Hasun 2'; Körper 25', 27', 40'; Bele 26'

Umpires:
Lee Barron (ENG)
Andres Ortiz (ESP)

18 January 2020
09:00

Austria	6–1	Ukraine
Körper 10', 15'; Bele 25', 31', 37'; Fröhlich 35'	Report	Kalinchuk 3'

Umpires:
Antonio Ilgrande (ITA)
Fraser Bell (SCO)

18 January 2020
10:15

Russia	5–4	Poland
Arusiia 9', 13', 20'; Khairullin 14'; Nadyrshin 33'	Report	Hulboj 2'; Kurowski 4'; Kasprzyk 16', 17'

Umpires:
Ben Goentgen (GER)
Paul van den Assum (NED)

==== Pool B ====
Pos	Team	Pld	W	D	L	GF	GA	GD	Pts	Qualification
1	Germany (H)	3	3	0	0	31	9	+22	9	Semi-finals
2	Netherlands	3	2	0	1	19	13	+6	6	Semi-finals
3	Czech Republic	3	1	0	2	8	21	−13	3	Relegation pool
4	Belgium	3	0	0	3	8	23	−15	0	Relegation pool

Source: FIH
(H) Hosts

17 January 2020
12:30

Czech Republic	2–6	Netherlands
Trejbal 10'; Železný 39'	Report	Burkhardt 13', 31', 40'; Leijs 22'; Bakker 33', 36'

Umpires:
ANdres Ortiz (ESP)
Lukasz Zwiercchowski (POL)

17 January 2020
13:45

Germany	12–1	Belgium
Müller 3'; Kamlade 14', 26'; Hartkopf 19', 38'; Schiffer 21', 22', 28', 30'; Prinz 32'; Doesch 36'; Schmid 40'	Report	Degroote 20'

Umpires:
Lee Barron (ENG)
Sean Edwards (ENG)

17 January 2020
18:30

Belgium	4–7	Netherlands
Simar 8', 38'; Truyens 10'; Degroote 19'	Report	Bakker 1'; Burkhardt 8', 27', 34'; Leijs 13', 35'; Sweering 40'

Umpires:
Ben Goentgen (GER)
Antonio Ilgrande (ITA)

17 January 2020
19:45

Czech Republic	2–12	Germany
Železný 10'; Seeman 27'	Report	Hartkopf 6', 19', 29'; Pöhling 6'; Müller 10', 16'; Doesch 12'; Prinz 13', 36'; Schmid 15'; Schiffer 21'; Rabente 27'

Umpires:
Michael Pontus (BEL)
Paul van den Assum (NED)

18 January 2020
11:30

Belgium	3–4	Czech Republic
Degroote 4', 30'; Zimmer 5'	Report	Železný 16'; Trejbal 19'; Seeman 37'; Jahoda 40'

Umpires:
Lukasz Zwiercchowski (POL)
Lee Barron (ENG)

18 January 2020
12:45

Germany	7–6	Netherlands
Schiffer 1', 17'; Doesch 10'; Pöhling 27'; Müller 30', 30'; Hartkopf 40'	Report	Goor 4'; Sweering 13', 20'; Bakker 16'; Leijs 21'; Burkhardt 29'

Umpires:
Andres Ortiz (ESP)
Sean Edwards (ENG)

=== Fifth to eighth place classification ===
==== Pool C ====
The points obtained in the preliminary round against the other team are taken over.

Pos	Team	Pld	W	D	L	GF	GA	GD	Pts	Relegation
5	Czech Republic	3	2	1	0	10	8	+2	7	
6	Belgium	3	2	0	1	20	15	+5	6	
7	Poland	3	1	1	1	12	14	−2	4	EuroHockey Indoor Championship II
8	Ukraine	3	0	0	3	13	18	−5	0	EuroHockey Indoor Championship II

Source: FIH

18 January 2020
16:45

Ukraine	7–10	Belgium
B. Kovalenko 4', 6', 29'; Diachenko 6'; Yasinskyi 14'; Kalinchuk 22'; Luppa 31'	Report	Dykmans 8', 21', 39'; Simar 10', 16', 16', 40'; Degroote 30'; Zimmer 36'; Maraite 37'

Umpires:
Lee Barron (ENG)
Fraser Bell (SCO)

18 January 2020
18:00

Poland	3–3	Czech Republic
Jarzyński 5'; Pavlak 14'; Nowakowski 34'	Report	Soukup 29', 37'; Jahoda 39'

Umpires:
Michael Pontus (BEL)
Andres Ortiz (ESP)

19 January 2020
10:00

Poland	4–7	Belgium
Kasprzyk 11', 26'; Kurowski 30'; Hulboj 32'	Report	Simar 9', 12', 33', 37'; Maraite 19'; Dykmans 34', 40'

Umpires:
Ben Goentgen (GER)
Fraser Bell (SCO)

19 January 2020
11:15

Czech Republic	3–2	Ukraine
Jahoda 3'; Trejbal 10'; Železný 39'	Report	Luppa 17', 37'

Umpires:
Lukasz Zwierzchowski (POL)
Paul van den Assum (NED)

=== First to fourth place classification ===
Semi-finals
18 January
Austria	5
Netherlands	3
18 January
Germany	6
Russia	1

Final
19 January
Austria	3
Germany	6
Third place
19 January
Netherlands	11
Russia	3

==== Semifinals ====
18 January 2020
19:15

Austria	5–3	Netherlands
Körper 1', 29', 37'; Bele 25', 34'	Report	Bakker 11'; Goor 26'; Leijs 40'

Umpires:
Ben Goentgen (GER)
Sean Edwards (ENG)

18 January 2020
20:45

Germany	6–1	Russia
Schiffer 10'; Hartkopf 12'; Doesch 17', 34'; Prinz 21', 28'	Report	Borisov 38'

Umpires:
Antonio Ilgrande (ITA)
Paul van den Assum (NED)

==== Third place game ====
19 January 2020
13:00

Netherlands	11–3	Russia
Leijs 3', 23'; Sweering 4'; Rohof 12'; Burkhardt 14', 27', 35', 40'; Bakker 20', 31'; Dekker 26'	Report	Khairullin 9'; Proskuriakov 15'; Nadyrshin 31'

Umpires:
Michael Pontus (BEL)
Andres Ortiz (ESP)

==== Final ====
19 January 2020
14:30

Austria	3–6	Germany
Körper 1', 25'; Unterkircher 32'	Report	Doesch 6', 32'; Schmid 16'; Prinz 25'; Hartkopf 31'; Schiffer 35'

Umpires:
Lee Barron (ENG)
Sean Edwards (ENG)

== Final standings ==
Pos	Team	Qualification or relegation
1	Germany (H)	Qualification for the 2022 Indoor World Cup
2	Austria	Qualification for the 2022 Indoor World Cup
3	Netherlands	Qualification for the 2022 Indoor World Cup
4	Russia	Qualification for the 2022 Indoor World Cup
5	Czech Republic	Qualification for the 2022 Indoor World Cup
6	Belgium	Qualification for the 2022 Indoor World Cup as hosts
7	Poland	Relegation to the EuroHockey Indoor Championship II
8	Ukraine	Relegation to the EuroHockey Indoor Championship II

Source: FIH
(H) Host

== See also ==
- 2020 Men's EuroHockey Indoor Championship II
- 2020 Women's EuroHockey Indoor Championship
