= 2014 Men's EuroHockey Indoor Championship =

2014 Men's EuroHockey Indoor Nations Championship
Tournament details
- Host country: Austria
- City: Vienna
- Dates: 17–19 January
- Teams: 8 (from 1 confederation)

Final positions
- Champions: Germany (14th title)
- Runner-up: Austria
- Third place: Russia

Tournament statistics
- Matches played: 20
- Goals scored: 202 (10.1 per match)
- Top scorer(s): (Germany) Moritz Fürste (Sweden) Johan Björkman (15 goals)

The 2014 Men's EuroHockey Indoor Championship was the seventeenth edition of the Men's EuroHockey Indoor Championship, the biennial international men's indoor hockey championship of Europe, organised by the European Hockey Federation. It took place from 17 to 19 January 2014 in Vienna, Austria.

Defending champions, Germany, won their 14th title by defeating Austria 4–3 on penalties, after the final finished 5–5. Russia won the bronze medal by defeating Poland 4–3.

== Qualified teams ==
Dates	Event	Location	Quotas	Qualifiers
January 2012	2012 EuroHockey Indoor Championship	Leipzig, Germany	6	Austria; Czech Republic; Germany; England; Netherlands; Russia
January 2012	2012 EuroHockey Indoor Championship II	Lignano, Italy	2	Poland; Sweden
Total			8	

== Results ==
All times are local (UTC+1).

=== Preliminary round ===
==== Pool A ====
Pos	Team	Pld	W	D	L	GF	GA	GD	Pts	Qualification
1	Germany	3	2	1	0	22	18	+4	7	Semi-finals
2	Russia	3	1	1	1	13	13	0	4	Semi-finals
3	Netherlands	3	1	1	1	17	18	−1	4	Pool C
4	England	3	0	1	2	17	20	−3	1	Pool C

Source: FIH

17 January 2014
10:00

Germany	6–4	Russia
Fürste 14', 24', 40'; Knoblauch 18'; Nevado 27'; Von Drachenfels 38'	Report	Lykov 8', 14'; Loginov 19'; Spichkovskii 31'

Umpires:
Pawel Linkowski (POL)
David Sweetman (SCO)

17 January 2014
11:10

Netherlands	7–6	England
Pruijser 12', 16', 26', 35'; Turkstra 15'; Kranstauber 28', 36'	Report	Ward 3', 34'; Cheesman 7'; Arnold 20'; Egerton 35'; Beckett 40'

Umpires:
Michael Soukup (CZE)
Nicklas Stenberg (SWE)

17 January 2014
15:30

Russia	3–3	England
Nikitin 2'; Zhirkov 7'; Azarov 16'	Report	Griffiths 24'; Beckett 32'; Ward 40+'

Umpires:
Oliver Tarnoczi (AUT)
Nicklas Stenberg (SWE)

17 January 2014
16:40

Netherlands	6–6	Germany
Kranstauber 17', 30'; Turkstra 25'; Tigges 37'; Pruijser 39', 40'	Report	Nevado 6', 13'; Fürste 7', 24', 34'; Von Drachenfels 26'

Umpires:
Pawel Linkowski (POL)
Michael Soukup (CZE)

18 January 2014
09:00

Germany	10–8	England
Fürste 10', 13', 16', 39', 40'; Staib 11'; Nevado 21', 25', 36'; Von Drachenfels 35'	Report	Ward 5', 9', 23', 33'; Griffiths 13'; Egerton 28', 34'; Beckett 37'

Umpires:
Oliver Tarnoczi (AUT)
David Sweetman (SCO)

18 January 2014
11:20

Russia	6–4	Netherlands
Zhirkov 5'; Lykov 9', 16', 26', 34'; Volkov 20+'	Report	Pruijser 7'; Kranstauber 7'; Tigges 32', 38'

Umpires:
Moritz Meissner (GER)
Michael Soukup (CZE)

==== Pool B ====
Pos	Team	Pld	W	D	L	GF	GA	GD	Pts	Qualification
1	Austria (H)	3	2	1	0	16	11	+5	7	Semi-finals
2	Poland	3	1	2	0	15	14	+1	5	Semi-finals
3	Czech Republic	3	1	1	1	14	13	+1	4	Pool C
4	Sweden	3	0	0	3	14	21	−7	0	Pool C

Source: FIH
(H) Hosts

17 January 2014
12:20

Czech Republic	4–4	Poland
Vacek 10', 14'; Bernátek 17'; Procházka 20'	Report	Rachwalski 8', 22', 29'; Makowski 24'

Umpires:
Andrés Ortíz (ESP)
Moritz Meissner (GER)

17 January 2014
13:30

Austria	7–4	Sweden
Minar 19'; Monghy 26'; Körper 28', 29', 33'; Greutter 35'; Stanzl 37'	Report	Hellstrand 12'; Joh. Björkman 16'; Eriksson 16'; Hemvik 40'

Umpires:
Coen van Bunge (NED)
Mikhail Golovanov (RUS)

17 January 2014
17:50

Poland	7–6	Sweden
Rachwalski 16', 18', 28', 32'; Raciniewski 21', 38'; Makowski 37'	Report	Joh. Björkman 3', 20+'; Hellstrand 5'; Mattsson 9', 11', 12'

Umpires:
Mikhail Golovanov (RUS)
David Sweetman (SCO)

17 January 2014
19:00

Austria	5–3	Czech Republic
Minar 12'; Schmidt 20'; Eitenberger 24'; Podpera 32'; Körper 37'	Report	Piterák 8'; Capouch 26'; Vudmaska 28'

Umpires:
Timothy Benford (ENG)
Andrés Ortíz (ESP)

18 January 2014
10:10

Czech Republic	7–4	Sweden
Procházka 14'; Piterák 16'; Vacek 18', 30'; Vudmaska 23'; Bernátek 36', 37'	Report	Joh. Björkman 5', 22'; Joa. Björkman 17'; Hemvik 40+'

Umpires:
Timothy Benford (ENG)
Mikhail Golovanov (RUS)

18 January 2014
12:30

Poland	4–4	Austria
Górny 2'; Rachwalski 8'; Lewartowski 14'; Majchrzak 25'	Report	Monghy 11'; Stanzl 13'; Körper 27'; Eitenberger 29'

Umpires:
Coen van Bunge (NED)
Nicklas Stenberg (SWE)

=== Classification round ===
==== Pool C ====
Pos	Team	Pld	W	D	L	GF	GA	GD	Pts	Relegation
1	Netherlands	3	3	0	0	20	11	+9	9	
2	Czech Republic	3	2	0	1	11	12	−1	6	
3	Sweden	3	1	0	2	15	20	−5	3	2014 EuroHockey Indoor Championship II
4	England	3	0	0	3	14	17	−3	0	2014 EuroHockey Indoor Championship II

Source: FIH

18 January 2014
15:30

England	6–7	Sweden
Griffiths 13'; Arnold 14', 18'; Ward 23', 37'; Beckett 36'	Report	Joh. Björkman 2', 9', 15', 18', 32', 37', 39'

Umpires:
Pawel Linkowski (POL)
Oliver Tarnoczi (AUT)

18 January 2014
16:40

Netherlands	6–1	Czech Republic
Pruijser 12', 33'; Kranstauber 13', 14'; Rohof 18', 27'	Report	Bernátek 37'

Umpires:
Timothy Benford (ENG)
Nicklas Stenberg (SWE)

19 January 2014
10:00

England	2–3	Czech Republic
Griffiths 7'; Egerton 21'	Report	Vacek 25'; Bernátek 33'; Vudmaska 36'

Umpires:
Mikhail Golovanov (RUS)
Coen van Bunge (NED)

19 January 2014
11:10

Netherlands	7–4	Sweden
Tigges 5', 40', 40'; Pruijser 15', 18', 22', 37'	Report	Mattsson 1'; Joh. Björkman 14', 30', 34'

Umpires:
Oliver Tarnoczi (AUT)
Michael Soukup (CZE)

=== Medal round ===
Semi-finals
18 January
Germany	10
Poland	2
18 January
Austria	5
Russia	4

Final
19 January
Germany (pen.)	5 (4)
Austria	5 (3)
Third place
19 January
Poland	3
Russia	4

==== Semi-finals ====
18 January 2014
17:50

Austria	5–4	Russia
Eitenberger 6', 18'; Stanzl 19'; Körper 26'; Monghy 38'	Report	Lykov 1'; Zhirkov 22'; Plesetskii 37'; Azarov 31'

Umpires:
Moritz Meissner (GER)
David Sweetman (SCO)

18 January 2014
19:15

Germany	10–2	Poland
Nevado 1', 13', 15'; Von Drachenfels 6'; Staib 20', 28', 35'; Knobloch 29', 38'; Fürste 32'	Report	Rachwalski 10', 25'

Umpires:
Coen van Bunge (NED)
Andrés Ortíz (ESP)

==== Third and fourth place ====
19 January 2014
13:00

Poland	3–4	Russia
Rachwalski 6', 39'; Makowski 20'	Report	Zhirkov 7'; Mokrousov 16'; Lykov 32', 38'

Umpires:
Timothy Benford (ENG)
Moritz Meissner (GER)

==== Final ====
19 January 2014
14:30

Germany	5–5	Austria
Fürste 2', 17', 18'; Nevado 25'; Staib 37'	Report	Körper 5', 13', 39', 40+'; Eitenberger 19'
Penalties
Von Drachenfels (penalty shoot-out scored); Nevado (penalty shoot-out scored); Fürste (penalty shoot-out scored); Fürste (penalty shoot-out scored)	4–3	(penalty shoot-out scored) Stanzl; (penalty shoot-out scored) Monghy; (penalty shoot-out scored) Körper; (penalty shoot-out missed) Stanzl

Umpires:
Pawel Linkowski (POL)
Andrés Ortíz (ESP)

== Final standings ==
As per statistical convention in indoor hockey, matches decided in extra time are counted as wins and losses, while matches decided by penalty shoot-outs are counted as draws.

Pos	Grp	Team	Pld	W	D	L	GF	GA	GD	Pts	Relegation
1st place, gold medalist(s)	A	Germany	5	3	2	0	37	25	+12	11	
2nd place, silver medalist(s)	B	Austria (H)	5	3	2	0	26	20	+6	11	
3rd place, bronze medalist(s)	A	Russia	5	2	1	2	21	21	0	7	
4	B	Poland	5	1	2	2	20	28	−8	5	
5	A	Netherlands	5	3	1	1	30	23	+7	10	
6	B	Czech Republic	5	2	1	2	18	21	−3	7	
7	B	Sweden	5	1	0	4	25	34	−9	3	Relegated to 2016 EuroHockey Indoor Championship II
8	A	England	5	0	1	4	25	30	−5	1	Relegated to 2016 EuroHockey Indoor Championship II

Source: FIH
(H) Hosts

== Goalscorers ==
There were 202 goals scored in 20 matches, for an average of 10.1 goals per match.

15 goals

- (Germany) Moritz Fürste
- (Sweden) Johan Björkman

13 goals

- (Netherlands) Mirco Pruijser

12 goals

- (Poland) Dariusz Rachwalski

10 goals

- (Austria) Michael Körper
- (Germany) Richardo Nevado

9 goals

- (England) Samuel Ward
- (Russia) Alexander Lykov

7 goals

- (Netherlands) Timmo Kranstauber

6 goals

- (Netherlands) Robbert Tigges

5 goals

- (Austria) Sebastian Eitenberger
- (Czech Republic) Štepan Bernátek
- (Czech Republic) David Vacek
- (Germany) Constantin Staib

4 goals

- (England) David Beckett
- (England) Simon Egerton
- (England) Christopher Griffiths
- (Germany) Daniel von Drachenfels
- (Russia) Alexander Zhirkov
- (Sweden) Magnus Mattsson

3 goals

- (Austria) Dominik Monghy
- (Austria) Benjamin Stanzl
- (Czech Republic) Ondrej Vudmaska
- (England) Benjamin Arnold
- (Germany) Felix Knoblauch
- (Poland) Krystian Makowski

2 goals

- (Austria) Michael Minar
- (Czech Republic) Daniel Piterák
- (Czech Republic) Tomás Procházka
- (Netherlands) Teun Rohof
- (Netherlands) Hidde Turkstra
- (Poland) Michal Raciniewski
- (Russia) Dmitrii Azarov
- (Sweden) Christopher Hellstrand
- (Sweden) Karl Kemvik

1 goal

- (Austria) Phillip Greutter
- (Austria) Mathias Podpera
- (Austria) Patrick Schmidt
- (Czech Republic) Martin Capouch
- (England) Darren Cheesman
- (Poland) Tomasz Górny
- (Poland) Marcin Lewartowski
- (Poland) Karol Majchrzak
- (Russia) Iaroslav Loginov
- (Russia) Evgenii Mokrousov
- (Russia) Dmitry Nikitin
- (Russia) Pavel Plesetskii
- (Russia) Sergei Spichkovskii
- (Russia) Dmitry Volkov
- (Sweden) Joakim Björkman
- (Sweden) Henry Eriksson

Source: FIH
