= Boris Burkhardt =

Dutch field hockey player (born 1996)

Personal information
- Born: 2 September 1996 (age 29) The Hague, Netherlands

Sport
- Sport: Field hockey
- Position: Forward
- Club: Amsterdam
National team
Years	Team	Caps	Goals
2015–2017	Netherlands U–21	8	(11)
2016–	Netherlands Indoor	29	(42)
2023–	Netherlands	12	(4)
Medal record
Men's field hockey
Representing Netherlands
FIH Pro League
Gold medal – first place	Season Four
Silver medal – second place	Season Five
EuroHockey U–21 Championship
Gold medal – first place	2017 Valencia
EuroHockey U–18 Championship
Bronze medal – third place	2013 Vienna
Men's indoor hockey
FIH Indoor World Cup
Silver medal – second place	2023 Pretoria
EuroHockey Indoor Championship
Bronze medal – third place	2020 Prague
Bronze medal – third place	2022 Hamburg

Boris Burkhardt (born 2 September 1996) is a Dutch field and indoor hockey player.

== Personal life ==
Boris Burkhardt on 2 September 1996. He was born and raised in The Hague, Netherlands.

== Career ==
=== Domestic league ===
In the Dutch national league, the Hoofdklasse, Burkhardt represents Amsterdam.

=== Under–21 ===
Burkhardt made his international debut at under–21 level. He made his first appearances for the Netherlands U–21 team in 2015, during a test series against India and Germany in Breda.

He didn't represent the national junior team again until 2017. He first appeared during a test match against Germany in Mönchengladbach, followed by the EuroHockey U–21 Championship in Valencia, where he won a gold medal.

=== Oranje ===
Burkhardt did not receive a call–up to the Oranje until 2023. He earned his first senior international cap during a match against India in Eindhoven, during the fourth season of the FIH Pro League.

Since his debut, he has gone on to compete in the fifth and sixth seasons of the FIH Pro League.

== International goals ==
The following is a list of field hockey goals scored by Burkhardt at international level.

Goal	Date	Location	Opponent	Score	Result	Competition	Ref.
1	7 June 2023	HC Oranje-Rood, Eindhoven, Netherlands	India	2–1	4–1	2022–23 FIH Pro League	
2	10 June 2023	HC Oranje-Rood, Eindhoven, Netherlands	India	2–1	3–2	2022–23 FIH Pro League	
3	4 July 2023	Wilrijkse Plein, Antwerp, Belgium	Belgium	4–2	4–2	2022–23 FIH Pro League	
4	28 July 2023	Estadi Martí Colomer, Terrassa, Spain	Spain	2–0	3–3	Test Match	

== Indoor hockey ==
In addition to field hockey, Burkhardt also represents the Netherlands Indoor team.

He has medalled with the national indoor team on three occasions. He took home bronze medals at the 2020 and 2022 iterations of the EuroHockey Indoor Championship, as well as a silver medal at the 2023 FIH Indoor World Cup, held in Pretoria.
