= 2018 Men's EuroHockey Indoor Championship =

Tournament details
- Host country: Belgium
- City: Antwerp
- Dates: 12–14 January
- Teams: 8 (from 1 confederation)
- Venue: Lotto Arena

Final positions
- Champions: Austria (2nd title)
- Runner-up: Belgium
- Third place: Germany

Tournament statistics
- Matches played: 20
- Goals scored: 153 (7.65 per match)
- Top scorer: (Germany) Moritz Fürste (11 goals)

The 2018 Men's EuroHockey Indoor Championship was the eighteenth edition of the Men's EuroHockey Indoor Championship, the biennial international men's indoor hockey championship of Europe organized by the European Hockey Federation. It took place from 12 to 14 January 2018 in Antwerp, Belgium.

Austria won their second title by defeating the hosts Belgium 2–1 in a shoot-out after being tied 4–4 after regular time. Three-time defending champions Germany won the bronze medal by defeating Poland 9–8.

== Qualified teams ==
Dates	Event	Location	Quotas	Qualifiers
15–17 January 2016	2016 EuroHockey Indoor Championship	Prague, Czech Republic	6	Austria (2); Czech Republic (6); Germany (1); Poland (5); Russia (4); Switzerland (8)
15–17 January 2016	2016 EuroHockey Indoor Championship II	Espinho, Portugal	2	Belgium (16); Denmark (19)
Total			8	

== Umpires ==
- Lee Barron (ENG)
- Coen van Bunge (NED)
- Johannes Berneth (GER)
- Martin Bucher (SUI)
- Daniel Denta (DEN)
- Michael Eilmer (AUT)
- Ben Goentgen (GER)
- Michael Pontus (BEL)
- Michael Soukup (CZE)
- Lukas Zwierchowski (POL)

== Results ==
All times are local (UTC+1).

=== Preliminary round ===
==== Pool A ====
Pos	Team	Pld	W	D	L	GF	GA	GD	Pts	Qualification
1	Germany	3	3	0	0	23	3	+20	9	Semi-finals
2	Poland	3	2	0	1	14	13	+1	6	Semi-finals
3	Czech Republic	3	1	0	2	12	12	0	3	Relegation pool
4	Denmark	3	0	0	3	5	26	−21	0	Relegation pool

Source: FIH
Rules for classification: 1) points; 2) goal difference; 3) goals scored; 4) head-to-head result.

12 January 2018
10:00

Poland	10–3	Denmark
Mikula 13', 35'; Makowski 15'; Górny 23', 34', 40'; Majchrzak 25'; Bratkowski 31', 32'; Zywiczka 38'	Report	Christensen 6'; Grand 19'; Nielsen 37'

Umpires:
Ben Goentgen (GER)
Martin Bucher (SUI)

12 January 2018
11:10

Germany	8–1	Czech Republic
Furste 9', 35'; Müller 9'; Kamlade 12', 21', 24', 32'; Boeckel 39'	Report	Plochý 31'

Umpires:
Michael Eilmer (AUT)
Michael Pontus (BEL)

12 January 2018
17:10

Czech Republic	9–1	Denmark
Kyndl 2', 9'; Plochý 3', 11', 26'; Perinka 7'; Jahoda 21'; Vacek 36'; Capouch 38'	Report	Jonasson 23'

Umpires:
Lee Barron (ENG)
Michael Pontus (BEL)

12 January 2018
18:20

Poland	1–8	Germany
Bratkowski 23'	Report	Boeckel 6', 17'; Schmid 11'; Furste 14', 24', 35'; Müller 21'; Kamlade 40+'

Umpires:
Coen van Bunge (NED)
Martin Bucher (SUI)

13 January 2018
09:00

Germany	7–1	Denmark
Müller 2'; Schmid 9'; Kamlade 15', 25'; Furste 18', 23'; Boeckel 26'	Report	Grand 5'

Umpires:
Michael Soukup (CZE)
Martin Bucher (SUI)

13 January 2018
10:10

Czech Republic	2–3	Poland
Plochý 21'; Vacek 39'	Report	Mikula 10'; Makowski 14', 28'

Umpires:
Lee Barron (ENG)
Michael Eilmer (AUT)

==== Pool B ====
Pos	Team	Pld	W	D	L	GF	GA	GD	Pts	Qualification
1	Belgium (H)	3	2	1	0	10	5	+5	7	Semi-finals
2	Austria	3	1	2	0	10	5	+5	5	Semi-finals
3	Russia	3	1	1	1	7	10	−3	4	Relegation pool
4	Switzerland	3	0	0	3	4	11	−7	0	Relegation pool

Source: FIH
Rules for classification: 1) points; 2) goal difference; 3) goals scored; 4) head-to-head result.
(H) Hosts

12 January 2018
12:20

Austria	5–0	Switzerland
Körper 9'; Stanzl 13'; Eitenberger 29', 32'; Uher 40'	Report

Umpires:
Johannes Berneth (GER)
Lukas Zwierchowski (POL)

12 January 2018
13:30

Russia	1–5	Belgium
Zhirkov 14'	Report	Zimmer 11', 40'; Dykmans 16'; Plennevaux 36'; Pangrazio 39'

Umpires:
Michael Soukup (CZE)
Daniel Denta (DEN)

12 January 2018
18:20

Russia	2–2	Austria
Vakhmistrov 30'; Khairullin 35'	Report	Hasun 31'; Körper 40'

Umpires:
Michael Soukup (CZE)
Lukas Zwierchowski (POL)

12 January 2018
19:30

Switzerland	1–2	Belgium
Keller 5'	Report	Maraite 10'; Dykmans 16'

Umpires:
Johannes Berneth (GER)
Daniel Denta (DEN)

13 January 2018
11:20

Switzerland	3–4	Russia
Müller 20+'; Morard 22'; Feller 28'	Report	Agafontsev 2'; Zhirkov 8'; Proskuriakov 12'; Golubev 29'

Umpires:
Coen van Bunge (NED)
Daniel Denta (DEN)

13 January 2018
12:30

Austria	3–3	Belgium
Körper 3'; Stanzl 9'; Hasun 13'	Report	Pokorny 10'; Cornillie 16'; Vandiest 32'

Umpires:
Ben Goentgen (GER)
Johannes Berneth (GER)

=== Fifth to eighth place classification ===
==== Pool C ====
The points obtained in the preliminary round against the other team are taken over.

Pos	Team	Pld	W	D	L	GF	GA	GD	Pts	Relegation
5	Czech Republic	3	3	0	0	17	6	+11	9	
6	Russia	3	2	0	1	12	9	+3	6	
7	Switzerland	3	1	0	2	11	11	0	3	EuroHockey Indoor Championship II
8	Denmark	3	0	0	3	6	20	−14	0	EuroHockey Indoor Championship II

Source: FIH
Rules for classification: 1) points; 2) goal difference; 3) goals scored; 4) head-to-head result.

13 January 2018
16:30

Denmark	3–6	Switzerland
Jonasson 4'; Trzepacz 9'; Grand 18'	Report	Morard 9', 25', 40'; Greder 11', 22'; Feller 30'

Umpires:
Johannes Berneth (GER)
Michael Eilmer (AUT)

13 January 2018
17:40

Czech Republic	4–3	Russia
Vacek 11', 31'; Kyndl 23', 29'	Report	Lepeshkin 4'; Agafontsev 8'; Zhirkov 15'

Umpires:
Lee Barron (ENG)
Daniel Denta (DEN)

14 January 2018
10:00

Russia	5–2	Denmark
Agafontsev 2'; Proskuriakov 7', 34', 36'; Khairullin 27'	Report	Grand 18'; Jonasson 29'

Umpires:
Michael Pontus (BEL)
Martin Bucher (SUI)

14 January 2018
11:10

Czech Republic	4–2	Switzerland
Jahoda 2'; Vacek 10', 11'; Kyndl 26'	Report	Greder 5'; Morard 30'

Umpires:
Coen van Bunge (NED)
Lukas Zwierchowski (POL)

=== First to fourth place classification ===
Semi-finals
13 January
Belgium	7
Poland	3
13 January
Germany	2 (3)
Austria (s.o.)	2 (4)

Final
14 January
Belgium	4 (1)
Austria (s.o.)	4 (2)
Third place
14 January
Poland	8
Germany	9

==== Semi-finals ====
13 January 2018
18:50

Belgium	7–3	Poland
Dykmans 2'; Plennevaux 4', 31'; Zimmer 16', 21'; Maraite 27'; Vandiest 36'	Report	Makowski 36', 40'; Mikula 39'

Umpires:
Ben Goentgen (GER)
Coen van Bunge (NED)

13 January 2018
20:15

Germany	2–2	Austria
Müller 15'; Kamlade 20'	Report	Körper 3'; Schmidt 5'
Penalties
Müller (penalty shoot-out missed); Kamlade (penalty shoot-out scored); Furste (penalty shoot-out missed); Furste (penalty shoot-out scored); Müller (penalty shoot-out scored); Kamlade (penalty shoot-out missed); Furste (penalty shoot-out missed); Müller (penalty shoot-out missed)	3–4	(penalty shoot-out scored) Eitenberger; (penalty shoot-out missed) Unterkircher; (penalty shoot-out missed) Körper; (penalty shoot-out scored) Eitenberger; (penalty shoot-out scored) Unterkircher; (penalty shoot-out missed) Körper; (penalty shoot-out missed) Eitenberger; (penalty shoot-out scored) Unterkircher

Umpires:
Michael Pontus (BEL)
Lukas Zwierchowski (POL)

==== Third place game ====
14 January 2018
13:00

Poland	8–9	Germany
Makowski 15', 31', 33'; Weide 21'; Kasprzyk 23'; Majchrzak 26', 36'; Mikula 34'	Report	Furste 2', 5', 29', 37'; Boeckel 18', 19', 20'; Müller 31'; Grünenwald 38'

Umpires:
Michael Eilmer (AUT)
Michael Soukup (CZE)

==== Final ====
14 January 2018
14:30

Belgium	4–4	Austria
Vandiest 20+'; Maraite 26'; De Groote 29'; Plennevaux 35'	Report	Stanzl 5', 8'; Eitenberger 10'; Schmidt 33'
Penalties
De Groote (penalty shoot-out scored); Zimmer (penalty shoot-out missed); Plennevaux (penalty shoot-out missed)	1–2	(penalty shoot-out missed) Eitenberger; (penalty shoot-out scored) Unterkircher; (penalty shoot-out scored) Körper

Umpires:
Lee Barron (ENG)
Ben Goentgen (GER)

== Final standings ==
Pos	Team	Relegation
1st place, gold medalist(s)	Austria	
2nd place, silver medalist(s)	Belgium (H)	
3rd place, bronze medalist(s)	Germany	
4	Poland	
5	Czech Republic	
6	Russia	
7	Switzerland	EuroHockey Indoor Championship II
8	Denmark	EuroHockey Indoor Championship II

Source: FIH
(H) Host

== See also ==
- 2018 Men's EuroHockey Indoor Championship II
- 2018 Women's EuroHockey Indoor Championship
