= Hidde Turkstra =

Dutch field hockey player

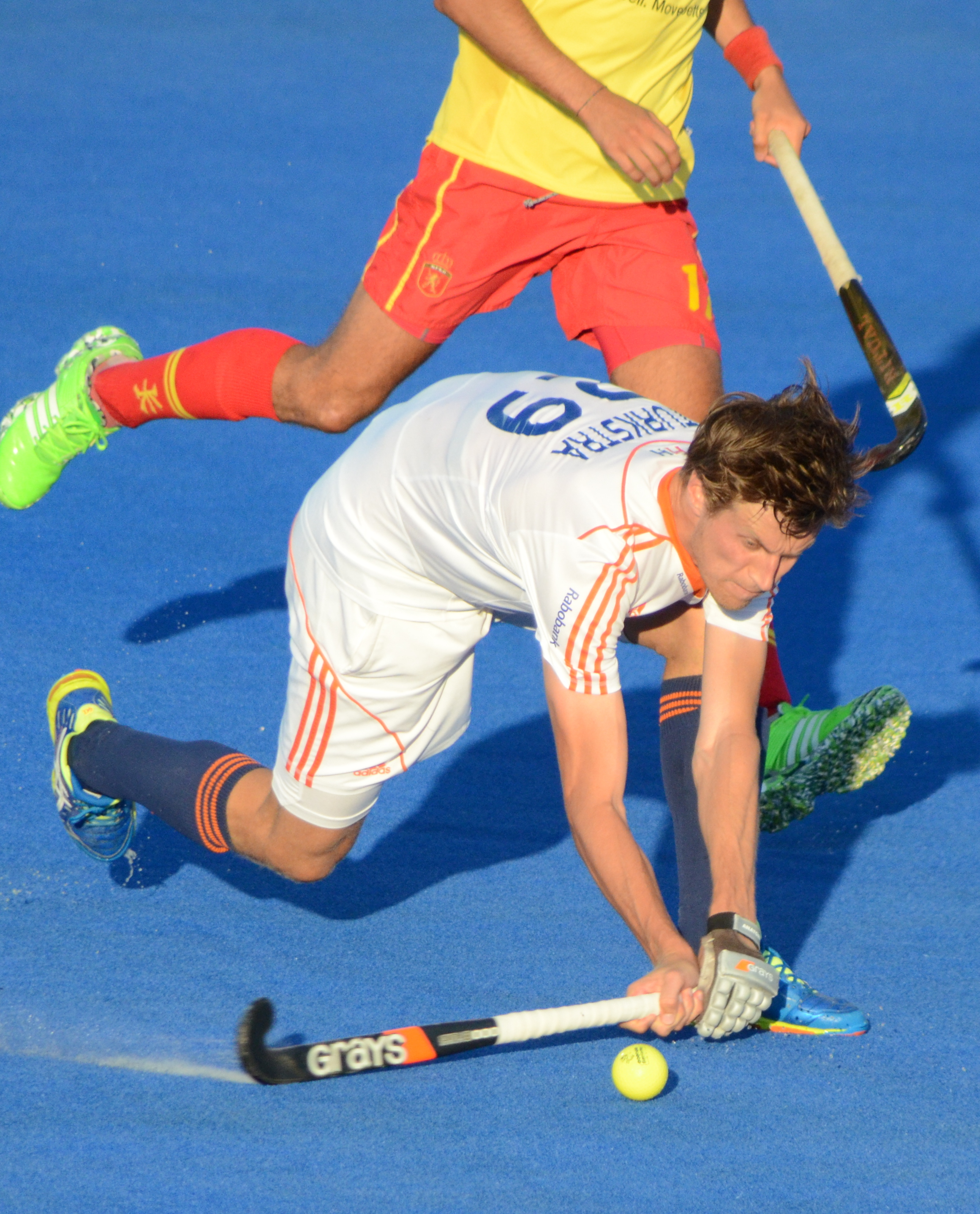

Personal information
- Born: 5 March 1988 (age 38) Rotterdam, Netherlands

Sport
- Sport: Field hockey
- Position: Defender
Youth career
- Years: Team
- –2005: Rotterdam
- 2005–2006: Victoria
Senior career
Years	Team	Caps	Goals
2006–2009	Victoria	-	-
2009–2019	Rotterdam	-	-
National team
Years	Team	Caps	Goals
2013–2016	Netherlands	44	-
2014	Netherlands (indoor)	5	-
Medal record
Men's field hockey
Representing the Netherlands
EuroHockey Championship
Gold medal – first place	2015 London

Hidde Turkstra (Dutch pronunciation: [ˈɦɪdə ˈtʏr(ə)kstraː]; born 5 March 1988) is a Dutch former field hockey player who played as a defender for the Dutch national team.

He participated at the 2016 Summer Olympics. and he played club hockey in the Netherlands for Rotterdam and Victoria.

== Club career ==
Turkstra started playing hockey at Rotterdam and in 2005 he switched to Victoria. Where he made his debut in the senior team. In 2009 he returned to Rotterdam, where he played for ten seasons until he retired in 2019.

== International career ==
Turkstra made his debut for the national team on 5 June 2013. He was a part of the Dutch squad which won the 2015 European Championship. After he played in the 2016 Summer Olympics he announced his retirement from the national team.
