= 2017 Men's EuroHockey Junior Championship =

Hockey tournament

Tournament details
- Host country: Spain
- City: Valencia
- Dates: 28 August – 3 September
- Teams: 8
- Venue: Estadio Betero

Final positions
- Champions: Netherlands (9th title)
- Runner-up: Belgium
- Third place: Germany

Tournament statistics
- Matches played: 20
- Goals scored: 118 (5.9 per match)
- Top scorer(s): (England) Will Calnan (Netherlands) Boris Burkhardt (11 goals)

The 2017 Men's EuroHockey Junior Championship was the 18th edition of the men's EuroHockey Junior Championship, the biennial international men's under-21 field hockey championship of Europe organized by the European Hockey Federation. It was held alongside the women's tournament in Valencia, Spain between 28 August and 3 September 2017.

The defending champions, the Netherlands won the tournament for the 9th time by defeating Belgium 5–3 in a shoot-out after the final finished in a 2–2 draw. The third-place match between Germany and Spain was cancelled due to illness.

== Qualified teams ==
The following eight teams qualified based on their final positions in the 2014 EuroHockey Junior Championships.

Dates	Event	Location	Quotas	Qualifiers
20–26 July 2014	2014 EuroHockey Junior Championship	Waterloo, Belgium	6	Netherlands; Germany; England; Belgium; Spain; Austria
13–19 July 2014	2014 EuroHockey Junior Championship II	Lousada, Portugal	2	Ireland; Portugal
Total			8	

== Results ==
=== Preliminary round ===
==== Pool A ====
Pos	Team	Pld	W	D	L	GF	GA	GD	Pts	Qualification
1	Spain (H)	3	1	2	0	17	5	+12	5	Semi-finals
2	Netherlands	3	1	2	0	15	5	+10	5	Semi-finals
3	England	3	1	2	0	12	4	+8	5	
4	Portugal	3	0	0	3	0	30	−30	0	

Source: FIH
(H) Hosts

28 August 2017
15:30

England	8–0	Portugal
Calnan 3', 21', 33', 46', 47'; D. Scott 23'; Clee 34'; P. Scott 45'	Report

Umpires:
Luka Zupancic (AUT)
Michael Pontus (BEL)

28 August 2017
20:00

Netherlands	3–3	Spain
Burkhardt 15', 54'; Beins 50'	Report	Cobos 17'; García Alcalde 39'; Miralles 49'

Umpires:
Federico García (URU)
Tim Meissner (GER)

30 August 2017
17:45

England	2–2	Netherlands
Calnan 24'; D. Scott 43'	Report	Beins 8'; Schoenaker 45'

Umpires:
Pietro Galligani (ITA)
Tim Meissner (GER)

30 August 2017
20:00

Spain	12–0	Portugal
Bordas 3', 18', 34', 48'; Lara 11'; Gispert 11', 58'; García Alcalde 28'; Cabot 49'; Miralles 59'; Basterra 59'; Parrilla 60'	Report

Umpires:
Rob Abbott (IRE)
Luka Zupancic (AUT)

31 August 2017
18:00

Netherlands	10–0	Portugal
M. De Vilder 4'; Burkhardt 8', 14', 22', 33', 42', 48', 53'; Pieters 49'; Van Dam 58'	Report

Umpires:
Tim Meissner (GER)
Rob Abbott (IRE)

31 August 2017
20:00

Spain	2–2	England
Escudé 8'; Gispert 27'	Report	Calnan 14'; Sorsby 48'

Umpires:
Pietro Galligani (ITA)
Michael Pontus (BEL)

==== Pool B ====
Pos	Team	Pld	W	D	L	GF	GA	GD	Pts	Qualification
1	Germany	3	3	0	0	10	3	+7	9	Semi-finals
2	Belgium	3	2	0	1	9	4	+5	6	Semi-finals
3	Ireland	3	0	1	2	7	11	−4	1	
4	Austria	3	0	1	2	5	13	−8	1	

Source: FIH

28 August 2017
09:00

Germany	4–2	Ireland
Bosserhoff 1'; Schiffer 21'; Rothländer 39'; Prinz 43'	Report	Wolfe 14'; Madeley 39'

Umpires:
Paul van den Assum (NED)
Sean Edwards (ENG)

28 August 2017
09:00

Belgium	5–1	Austria
Stockbroekx 10', 20', 34'; Capelle 47'; Willems 54'	Report	Steyrer 43'

Umpires:
Daniel Rodríguez (ESP)
Rob Abbott (IRE)

30 August 2017
09:00

Ireland	4–4	Austria
Dale 9', 56'; O'Hare 13'; Madeley 17'	Report	Wellan 14'; Steyrer 20', 43'; Binder 54'

Umpires:
Paul van den Assum (NED)
Pedro Santos (POR)

30 August 2017
11:15

Belgium	1–2	Germany
Kina 28'	Report	Hartkopf 9'; H. Müller 59'

Umpires:
Federico García (URU)
Daniel Rodríguez (ESP)

31 August 2017
11:15

Germany	4–0	Austria
Große 23'; Pfaff 36'; Dösch 40'; Werner 60'	Report

Umpires:
Federico García (URU)
Pedro Santos (POR)

31 August 2017
11:15

Ireland	1–3	Belgium
Cole 44'	Report	Raes 8', 44'; Lemaire 22'

Umpires:
Sean Edwards (ENG)
Daniel Rodríguez (ESP)

=== Fifth to eighth place classification ===
The points obtained in the preliminary round against the other team are taken over.

==== Pool C ====
Pos	Team	Pld	W	D	L	GF	GA	GD	Pts	Relegation
5	England	3	3	0	0	16	1	+15	9	
6	Austria	3	1	1	1	17	5	+12	4	
7	Ireland	3	1	1	1	16	13	+3	4	Relegation to Junior Championship II
8	Portugal	3	0	0	3	2	32	−30	0	Relegation to Junior Championship II

Source: FIH

2 September 2017
09:00

Portugal	0–13	Austria
	Report	Puchhammer 2', 3', 4', 27'; Binder 7', 53'; Schippan 16', 19', 34', 47'; Kaltenböck 25'; Unterkircher 41'; Wellan 58'

Umpires:
Tim Meissner (GER)
Rob Abbott (IRE)

2 September 2017
11:30

England	7–1	Ireland
Calnan 2', 35', 47', 54'; Page 15'; Way 39'; P. Scott 53'	Report	Grace 60'

Umpires:
Federico García (URU)
Luka Zupancic (AUT)

3 September 2017
09:15

England	1–0	Austria
Sorsby 29'	Report

Umpires:
Pietro Galligani (ITA)
Pedro Santos (POR)

3 September 2017
10:30

Ireland	11–2	Portugal
Wolfe 3', 4'; Mullins 20'; Madeley 21', 33', 48', 48', 57'; Empey 27'; Cole 46'; Dale 60'	Report	Basilio 22'; Ribeiro 44'

Umpires:
Michael Pontus (BEL)
Paul van den Assum (NED)

=== First to fourth place classification ===
Semi-finals
2 September 2017
Germany	1
Netherlands	2
2 September 2017
Spain	0
Belgium	1

Final
3 September 2017
Netherlands (s.o)	2 (5)
Belgium	2 (3)
Third place
3 September 2017
Germany	0
Spain	0

==== Semi-finals ====
2 September 2017
09:00

Germany	1–2	Netherlands
Michler 35'	Report	Schoenaker 23'; Burkhardt 43'

Umpires:
Sean Edwards (ENG)
Michael Pontus (BEL)

2 September 2017
17:30

Spain	0–1	Belgium
	Report	Lemaire 37'

Umpires:
Paul van den Assum (NED)
Pietro Galligani (ITA)

==== Third and fourth place ====
3 September 2017
11:30

Germany	Cancelled	Spain
	Report; Match cancelled due to illness.

==== Final ====
3 September 2017
17:30

Netherlands	2–2	Belgium
Schoenaker 7'; Burkhardt 35'	Report	Lemaire 8'; Stockbroekx 57'
Penalties
Van Dam (penalty shoot-out scored); Bakker (penalty shoot-out scored); Van Heijningen (penalty shoot-out scored); Pieters (penalty shoot-out scored); Burkhardt (penalty shoot-out scored)	5–3	(penalty shoot-out scored) Stockbroekx; (penalty shoot-out missed) Raes; (penalty shoot-out scored) Lemaire; (penalty shoot-out scored) Poncelet

Umpires:
Federico García (URU)
Daniel Rodríguez (ESP)

== Statistics ==
=== Final standings ===
Rank	Team
Gold medal	Netherlands
Silver medal	Belgium
Bronze medal	Germany
4	Spain
5	England
6	Austria
7	Ireland
8	Portugal

Relegated to the EuroHockey Junior Championship II

=== Goalscorers ===
There were 118 goals scored in 20 matches, for an average of 5.9 goals per match.

11 goals

- (England) Will Calnan
- (Netherlands) Boris Burkhardt

7 goals

- (Ireland) Luke Madeley

4 goals

- (Austria) Jakob Puchhammer
- (Austria) Phillip Schippan
- (Belgium) Gregory Stockbroekx
- (Spain) Manuel Bordas

3 goals

- (Austria) Oliver Binder
- (Austria) Florian Steyrer
- (Belgium) Alexis Lemaire
- (Ireland) Julian Dale
- (Ireland) Simon Wolfe
- (Netherlands) Noud Schoenaker
- (Spain) Xavi Gispert

2 goals

- (Austria) Nikolas Wellan
- (Belgium) Henri Raes
- (England) Peter Scott
- (England) Tom Sorsby
- (Ireland) Geoffrey Cole
- (Netherlands) Teun Beins
- (Spain) Lucas Garcia Alcalde
- (Spain) Marc Miralles

1 goal

- (Austria) Peter Kaltenböck
- (Austria) Fabian Unterkircher
- (Belgium) Louis Capelle
- (Belgium) Antoine Kina
- (Belgium) Tommy Willems
- (England) Jack Clee
- (England) Nick Page
- (England) Edward Way
- (Germany) Niklas Bosserhoff
- (Germany) Paul Doesch
- (Germany) Johannes Große
- (Germany) Raphael Hartkopf
- (Germany) Linus Michler
- (Germany) Hannes Müller
- (Germany) Lukas Pfaff
- (Germany) Thies Prinz
- (Germany) Moritz Rothländer
- (Germany) Jan Schiffer
- (Germany) Maximilian Werner
- (Ireland) Conor Empey
- (Ireland) Samuel Grace
- (Ireland) John Mullins
- (Ireland) Keith Ohare
- (Netherlands) Thijs van Dam
- (Netherlands) Terrance Pieters
- (Netherlands) Morris de Vilder
- (Portugal) Joao Basilio
- (Portugal) Vasco Ribeiro
- (Spain) José Basterra
- (Spain) Javier Cabot
- (Spain) Ignacio Cobos
- (Spain) Marc Escudé
- (Spain) Jan Lara
- (Spain) Pol Parrilla

Source: FIH

== See also ==
- 2017 Men's EuroHockey Nations Championship
- 2017 Women's EuroHockey Junior Championship
