= 2020 Men's EuroHockey Indoor Championship II =

2020 Indoor Championship II
Tournament details
- Host country: Switzerland
- City: Lucerne
- Dates: 17-19 January 2020
- Teams: 8 (from 1 confederation)
- Venue(s): Maihof Halle

Final positions
- Champions: Switzerland (1st title)
- Runner-up: Belarus
- Third place: Portugal

Tournament statistics
- Matches played: 20
- Goals scored: 148 (7.4 per match)
- Top scorer(s): (Portugal) David Franco (Portugal) Vasco Ribeiro (10 goals)
All statistics are correct as of 23 January 2020


The 2020 Eurohockey Indoor Championship II was the 7th edition of the tournament. It took take place from 17 to 19 January 2020 in Lucerne, Switzerland.

== Qualified Teams ==
- Belarus
- Croatia
- Denmark
- Italy
- Portugal
- Slovakia
- Switzerland
- Turkey

Sweden finished 3rd in the previous tournament, but did not take part in 2020. Instead Turkey, which as 7th placed team in 2018 were originally relegated, took part.

== Format ==
The eight teams are split into two groups of four teams. The bottom two teams from pool A and B, play in a new group, pool C, against the teams they did not play against in the group stage. The top two teams from pool A and B, will also play in a new group, pool D, where they play the teams they did not play against in the group stage to determine the winner. All points from pools A and B will be taken over in pools C and D. The top two teams will be promoted to the 2022 Men's EuroHockey Indoor Nations Championship. The last two teams will be relegated to the 2022 Eurohockey Indoor Championship III.

== Results ==
All times are local (UTC+1).

=== Preliminary round ===
==== Pool A ====
Pos	Team	Pld	W	D	L	GF	GA	GD	Pts	Qualification or relegation
1	Switzerland	3	2	1	0	15	6	+9	7	Advance to Pool D
2	Croatia	3	1	1	1	7	6	+1	4	Advance to Pool D
3	Slovakia	3	1	1	1	10	13	−3	4	Transfer to Pool C
4	Italy	3	0	1	2	8	15	−7	1	Transfer to Pool C

Source: FIH
Rules for classification: 1) points; 2) goal difference; 3) goals scored; 4) head-to-head result.

17 January 2020
12:30

Croatia	2—3	Slovakia
Premilovac 3', 14'	Report	Petráš 2'; Hruska 16'; Jelačič 40'

Umpires:
Siarhei Mishevich (BLR)
Hüseyin Emin (TUR)

17 January 2020
13:45

Switzerland	7—2	Italy
Stomps 1', 5', 6', 38'; Greder 24'; Brönnimann 29', 29'	Report	Lago 11'; Garbaccio 32'

Umpires:
Kevin Roberts (WAL)
Bruno Santos (POR)

17 January 2020
18:30

Italy	5—5	Slovakia
Lago 14', 16', 23', 32'; Dallons 39'	Report	Jelačič 3', 20', 40'; Petráš 33'; Romanec 36'

Umpires:
Siarhei Mischevich (BLR)
Bruno Santos (POR)

17 January 2020
19:45

Croatia	2—2	Switzerland
Posavec 14'; Zec 24'	Report	Stomps 1', 35'

Umpires:
Maarten Boxma (NED)
Hüseyin Emin (TUR)

18 January 2020
11:30

Italy	1—3	Croatia
Dallons 37'	Report	A. Fujs 22'; Posavec 26'; G. Fujs 31'

Umpires:
Kevin Roberts (WAL)
Siarhei Mischevich (BLR)

18 January 2020
12:45

Switzerland	6—2	Slovakia
Marelli 2'; Stomps 4', 38'; Landtwing 6'; Brönnimann 16'; Knabenhans 26'	Report	Petráš 29'; Kovačevič 30'

Umpires:
Bruno Santos (POR)
Hüseyin Emin (TUR)

==== Pool B ====
Pos	Team	Pld	W	D	L	GF	GA	GD	Pts	Qualification or relegation
1	Belarus	3	2	1	0	18	10	+8	7	Advance to Pool D
2	Portugal	3	2	0	1	17	11	+6	6	Advance to Pool D
3	Turkey	3	1	1	1	15	15	0	4	Transfer to Pool C
4	Denmark	3	0	0	3	7	21	−14	0	Transfer to Pool C

Source: FIH
Rules for classification: 1) points; 2) goal difference; 3) goals scored; 4) head-to-head result.

17 January 2020
10:00

Denmark	3—7	Turkey
Giessing 32'; Riisom 38'; Fich 40'	Report	Çeker 12'; Acikgoz 23', 28', 38'; Aydin 27', 39'; Elagöz 31'; Ataş 38'

Umpires:
Maarten Boxma (NED)
Michal Pivko (SVK)

17 January 2020
11:15

Portugal	4—5	Belarus
Franco 7'; Ribeiro 15', 22'; Tavares 38'	Report	Khatyliou 9'; Belavusau 13', 13'; Stsepanets 23'; Hancharou 40'

Umpires:
Benjamin Messerli (SUI)
Ivan Grgurev (CRO)

17 January 2020
16:00

Turkey	5—5	Belarus
Ataş 3'; Acikgoz 7'; Cengiz 24'; Aydin 32'; Elagöz 36'	Report	Hancharou 2', 36', 38'; Stsepanets 15'; Mikheichyk 30'

Umpires:
Jorge Ocaña (ESP)
Kamaal Khan (ITA)

17 January 2020
17:15

Portugal	6—3	Denmark
Franco 5', 26', 39'; Mourão 8'; Ribeiro 31', 31'	Report	Pedersen 20+'; Fich 27'; Grand 30'

Umpires:
Benjamin Messerli (SUI)
Michal Pivko (SVK)

18 January 2020
09:00

Denmark	1—8	Belarus
Grand 34'	Report	Yahoshchankau 3', 31'; Hancharou 8', 12'; Mikheichyk 13'; Kadran 14'; Belavusau 20'; Korsik 27'

Umpires:
Kamaal Khan (ITA)
Benjamin Messerli (SUI)

18 January 2020
10:15

Turkey	3—7	Portugal
Elagöz 1'; Ataş 8'; Acikgoz 39'	Report	Ribeiro 19', 24', 25', 32'; Teixeira 26'; Moreira 34'; Franco 36'

Umpires:
Jorge Ocaña (ESP)
Ivan Grgurev (CRO)

=== Fifth to eighth place classification ===
==== Pool C ====
The points obtained in the preliminary round against the other team are taken over.

Pos	Team	Pld	W	D	L	GF	GA	GD	Pts	Relegation
1	Turkey	3	2	1	0	16	8	+8	7	
2	Italy	3	1	2	0	14	11	+3	5	
3	Slovakia	3	1	1	1	12	11	+1	4	Relegated to EuroHockey Indoor Nations Championship III
4	Denmark	3	0	0	3	6	18	−12	0	Relegated to EuroHockey Indoor Nations Championship III

Source: FIH
Rules for classification: 1) points; 2) goal difference; 3) goals scored; 4) head-to-head result.

18 January 2020
16:45

Italy	5—2	Denmark
Lago 1', 32'; Amorosini 33', 37', 40+'	Report	Grand 17', 34'

Umpires:
Jorge Ocaña (ESP)
Bruno Santos (POR)

18 January 2020
18:00

Slovakia	1—5	Turkey
Petráš 12'	Report	Ekinci 16'; Elagöz 21', 28', 32', 35'

Umpires:
Kamaal Khan (ITA)
Ivan Grgurev (CRO)

19 January 2020
10:00

Slovakia	6—1	Denmark
Romanec 18', 35'; Petráš 18', 27', 38'; Kovačevič 37'	Report	Grand 17'

Umpires:
Siarhei Mishevich (BLR)
Benjamin Messerli (SUI)

19 January 2020
11:30

Turkey	4—4	Italy
Ataş 22'; Elagöz 30', 40'; Çeker 31'	Report	Lago 24'; Dallons 33'; Amorosini 34'; Melato 39'

Umpires:
Ivan Grgurev (CRO)
Jorge Ocaña (ESP)

==== Pool D ====
The points obtained in the preliminary round against the other team are taken over.

Pos	Team	Pld	W	D	L	GF	GA	GD	Pts	Relegation
1	Switzerland	3	2	1	0	7	5	+2	7	Promoted to 2022 Indoor Nations Championship
2	Belarus	3	2	0	1	10	9	+1	6	Promoted to 2022 Indoor Nations Championship
3	Portugal	3	1	0	2	11	11	0	3	
4	Croatia	3	0	1	2	8	11	−3	1	

Source: FIH
Rules for classification: 1) points; 2) goal difference; 3) goals scored; 4) head-to-head result.

18 January 2020
19:15

Croatia	4—6	Portugal
Zec 9'; G. Fujs 17', 20', 32'	Report	Franco 4', 16', 26', 37'; Ribeiro 10+', 15'

Umpires:
Maarten Boxma (NED)
Siarhei Mishevich (BLR)

18 January 2020
20:30

Switzerland	3—2	Belarus
Brönnimann 10'; Knabenhans 14'; Morard 35'	Report	Korsik 15'; Mikheichyk 16'

Umpires:
Kevin Roberts (WAL)
Michal Pivko (SVK)

19 January 2020
13:00

Belarus	3—2	Croatia
Stsepanets 30'; Belavusau 39'; Kochkin 40'	Report	Hršak 2'; Zec 28'

Umpires:
Maarten Boxma (NED)
Hüseyin Emin (TUR)

19 January 2020
14:30

Switzerland	2—1	Portugal
Knabenhans 30'; Stomps 40'	Report	Franco 29'

Umpires:
Kevin Roberts (WAL)
Michal Pivko (SVK)

== Final standings ==
Rank	Team
Gold medal	Switzerland
Silver medal	Belarus
Bronze medal	Portugal
4	Croatia
5	Turkey
6	Italy
7	Slovakia
8	Denmark
