= Men's EuroHockey Indoor Championship =

Men's indoor hockey competition

- Most recent season or competition: 2026 Men's EuroHockey Indoor Championship
- Sport: Indoor hockey
- Founded: 1974; 52 years ago
- No. of teams: 10
- Confederation: EHF (Europe)
- Most recent champion: Austria (4th title) (2026)
- Most titles: Germany (17 titles)
- Level on pyramid: 1
- Relegation to: EuroHockey Indoor Championship II

The Men's EuroHockey Indoor Championship is an international men's indoor hockey competition organized by the European Hockey Federation. The winning team becomes the champion of Europe. The tournament serves as a qualification tournament for the Indoor Hockey World Cup.

The tournament is part of the EuroHockey Indoor Championships and is the highest level in the men's competition. The lowest two teams each year are relegated to the EuroHockey Indoor Championship II and replaced by the highest two teams from that competition. From 2024 onwards the tournament will be played with ten instead of eight teams.

The tournament has been won by three different teams: Germany has the most titles with seventeen, Austria has four titles and Russia has won the tournament once. The most recent edition was held in Heidelberg, Germany and was won by Austria.

== Results ==
Year	Host	Final			Third place match			Number of teams
Year	Host	Winner	Score	Runner-up	Third place	Score	Fourth place	Number of teams
1974	Berlin, West Germany	West Germany	Round-robin	Netherlands	Switzerland	Round-robin	Scotland	6
1976	Arnhem, Netherlands	West Germany	Round-robin	Belgium	Netherlands	Round-robin	Scotland	6
1980	Zürich, Switzerland	West Germany	Round-robin	Netherlands	Scotland	Round-robin	England	7
1984	Edinburgh, Scotland	West Germany	Round-robin	England	Netherlands	Round-robin	Scotland	6
1988	Vienna, Austria	West Germany	Round-robin	France	Austria	Round-robin	Scotland	6
1991	Birmingham, England	Germany	7–3	England	Scotland		Poland	8
1994	Bonn, Germany	Germany	9–2	England	Czech Republic	7–6	Austria	8
1997	Liévin, France	Germany	10–5	Czech Republic	Denmark	8–6	Russia	8
1999	Slagelse, Denmark	Germany	9–6	Poland	Switzerland	7–5	Spain	8
2001	Lucerne, Switzerland	Germany	9–2	Spain	Poland	5–4	France	8
2003	Santander, Spain	Germany	6–1	Spain	Switzerland	3–2	Czech Republic	8
2006	Eindhoven, Netherlands	Germany	4–3	Poland	Spain	4–3	Switzerland	8
2008	Yekaterinburg, Russia	Russia	3–2	Germany	Austria	3–0	Spain	8
2010	Almere, Netherlands	Austria	4–3 (a.e.t.)	Russia	Netherlands	5–2	Spain	8
2012	Leipzig, Germany	Germany	4–0	Czech Republic	Austria	5–3	Netherlands	8
2014; Details	Vienna, Austria	Germany	5–5 (4–3 s.o.)	Austria	Russia	4–3	Poland	8
2016; Details	Prague, Czech Republic	Germany	3–2	Austria	Russia	4–3	Czech Republic	8
2018; Details	Antwerp, Belgium	Austria	4–4 (2–1 s.o.)	Belgium	Germany	9–8	Poland	8
2020; Details	Berlin, Germany	Germany	6–3	Austria	Netherlands	11–3	Russia	8
2022; Details	Hamburg, Germany	Austria	2–1	Germany	Netherlands	10–3	Switzerland	6
2024; Details	Leuven, Belgium	Germany	5–2	Poland	Belgium	7–6	Austria	10
2026; Details	Heidelberg, Germany	Austria	3–3 (3–2 s.o.)	Poland	Spain	6–5	Germany	10
2028; Details	Gniezno, Poland							10
2030; Details	Brussels, Belgium							10

=== Summary ===
Team	Winners	Runners-up	Third place	Fourth place
Germany	17 (1974*, 1976, 1980, 1984, 1988, 1991, 1994*, 1997, 1999, 2001, 2003, 2006, 2012*, 2014, 2016, 2020*, 2024)	2 (2008, 2022*)	1 (2018)	1 (2026*)
Austria	4 (2010, 2018, 2022, 2026)	3 (2014*, 2016, 2020)	3 (1988*, 2008, 2012)	2 (1994, 2024)
Russia	1 (2008*)	1 (2010)	2 (2014, 2016)	2 (1997, 2020)
Poland		4 (1999, 2006, 2024, 2026)	1 (2001)	3 (1991, 2014, 2018)
England		3 (1984, 1991*, 1994)		1 (1980)
Netherlands		2 (1974, 1980)	5 (1976*, 1984, 2010*, 2020, 2022)	1 (2012)
Spain		2 (2001, 2003*)	2 (2006, 2026)	3 (1999, 2008, 2010)
Czech Republic		2 (1997, 2012)	1 (1994)	2 (2003, 2016*)
Belgium		2 (1976, 2018*)	1 (2024*)	
France		1 (1988)		1 (2001)
Switzerland			3 (1974, 1999, 2003)	2 (2006, 2022)
Scotland			2 (1980, 1991)	4 (1974, 1976, 1984*, 1988)
Denmark			1 (1997)	

* = hosts

=== Team appearances ===
Team	(West Germany) 1974	(Netherlands) 1976	(Switzerland) 1980	(Scotland) 1984	(Austria) 1988	(England) 1991	(Germany) 1994	(France) 1997	(Denmark) 1999	(Switzerland) 2001	(Spain) 2003	(Netherlands) 2006	(Russia) 2008	(Netherlands) 2010	(Germany) 2012	(Austria) 2014	(Czech Republic) 2016	(Belgium) 2018	(Germany) 2020	(Germany) 2022	(Belgium) 2024	(Germany) 2026	(Poland) 2028	(Belgium) 2030	Total
Austria	6th	5th	6th	–	3rd	5th	4th	5th	7th	–	–	5th	3rd	1st	3rd	2nd	2nd	1st	2nd	1st	4th	1st	Q		20
Belgium	5th	2nd	–	–	–	–	–	–	–	–	–	–	–	–	–	–	–	2nd	6th	5th	3rd	5th	Q	Q	9
Croatia	Part of Yugoslavia						–	–	–	–	–	–	–	–	–	–	–	–	–	–	9th	–	Q		2
Czech Republic	Part of Czechoslovakia						3rd	2nd	6th	5th	4th	6th	6th	6th	2nd	6th	4th	5th	5th	6th	8th	8th	Q		17
Denmark	–	–	–	–	–	–	7th	3rd	5th	7th	–	8th	–	8th	–	–	–	8th	–	–	–	–	–		7
England	–	–	4th	2nd	–	2nd	2nd	–	–	–	–	–	–	–	7th	8th	–	–	–	–	–	–	–		6
France	–	6th	–	5th	2nd	6th	6th	7th	–	4th	7th	–	–	–	–	–	–	–	–	–	–	–	–		8
Germany	1st	1st	1st	1st	1st	1st	1st	1st	1st	1st	1st	1st	2nd	5th	1st	1st	1st	3rd	1st	2nd	1st	4th	Q		23
Ireland	–	–	–	–	–	–	–	–	–	–	–	–	–	–	–	–	–	–	–	–	–	10th	–		1
Italy	–	–	–	6th	–	–	–	–	–	–	–	–	5th	7th	–	–	–	–	–	–	–	–	Q		4
Netherlands	2nd	3rd	2nd	3rd	–	–	–	–	–	–	6th	7th	–	3rd	4th	5th	7th	–	3rd	3rd	–	–	–		12
Poland	–	–	–	–	5th	4th	–	–	2nd	3rd	5th	2nd	8th	–	–	4th	5th	4th	7th	–	2nd	2nd	Q		14
Portugal	–	–	–	–	–	–	–	–	–	8th	–	–	–	–	–	–	–	–	–	–	7th	7th	Q		4
Russia	Part of the Soviet Union						8th	4th	8th	–	8th	–	1st	2nd	6th	3rd	3rd	6th	4th	DSQ	–	–	–		11
Scotland	4th	4th	3rd	4th	4th	3rd	–	8th	–	–	–	–	–	–	–	–	–	–	–	–	–	–	–		7
Spain	–	–	5th	–	6th	7th	5th	6th	4th	2nd	2nd	3rd	4th	4th	5th	–	–	–	–	–	5th	3rd	Q		15
Sweden	–	–	–	–	–	–	–	–	–	–	–	–	–	–	–	7th	8th	–	–	–	–	–	–		2
Switzerland	3rd	–	7th	–	–	8th	–	–	3rd	6th	3rd	4th	7th	–	8th	–	6th	7th	–	4th	6th	6th	Q		15
Turkey	–	–	–	–	–	–	–	–	–	–	–	–	–	–	–	–	–	–	–	–	–	9th	–		1
Ukraine	Part of the Soviet Union						–	–	–	–	–	–	–	–	–	–	–	–	8th	–	10th	–	–		2
Total	6	6	7	6	6	8	8	8	8	8	8	8	8	8	8	8	8	8	8	6	10	10	10	10	

== See also ==
- Men's EuroHockey Championship
- EuroHockey Indoor Championships
- Women's EuroHockey Indoor Championship
- Men's EuroHockey Indoor Club Cup
