= 2026 Men's EuroHockey U21 Championship II =

Tournament details
- Host countries: Poland; Czechia
- Dates: 27 July–1 August
- Teams: 10 (from 1 confederation)
- Venue: 2 (in 2 host cities)

The 2026 Men's EuroHockey U21 Championship II was the 14th edition of the Men's EuroHockey U21 Championship II, the second level of the men's European under-21 field hockey championships organised by the European Hockey Federation. There were two Championship II's held, namely Championship II-A and Championship II-B. Championship II-A was held in Poznań, Poland from 27 July to 1 August 2026, while Championship II-B was held in Plzen Litice, Czechia from 28 July to 1 August 2026.

The winners of both tournaments, Ireland and Scotland qualified for the 2028 EuroHockey U21 Championship and the 2027 FIH Hockey Junior World Cup.

== Qualification ==
Dates	Event	Location	Quotas	Qualifier(s)
14–20 July 2024	2024 EuroHockey U21 Championship	Terrassa, Spain	2	Ireland; Turkey
15–20 July 2024	2024 EuroHockey U21 Championship II	Wałcz, Poland	7	Italy; Lithuania; Poland; Ukraine; ~~Luxembourg~~; Croatia
15–20 July 2024	2024 EuroHockey U21 Championship II	Lausanne, Switzerland	7	Czech Republic; Scotland; Wales
Total			9	

== Championship II-A ==
2026 Men's EuroHockey U21 Championship II-A
Tournament details
- Host country: Poland
- City: Poznań
- Dates: 27 July – 1 August 2026
- Teams: 6 (from 1 confederation)
- Venue: AZS Politechnika Pocztowiec Poznań

Final positions
- Champions: Ireland (4th title)
- Runner-up: Italy
- Third place: Poland

Tournament statistics
- Matches played: 15
- Goals scored: 103 (6.87 per match)
- Top scorer: (Ireland) Toby O'Connell (10 goals)
- Best player: (Italy) Francesco Atzori
- Best goalkeeper: (Poland) Maksymilian Pawlak

The Championship II-A was held at AZS Politechnika Pocztowiec Poznań in Poznań, Poland from 27 July to 1 August 2026. Ireland finished first in the round-robin tournament to win their fourth EuroHockey U21 Championship II title and qualified for the 2028 EuroHockey U21 Championship and 2027 FIH Hockey Junior World Cup.

=== Standings ===
Pos	Team	Pld	W	D	L	GF	GA	GD	Pts	Qualification
1	Ireland	5	5	0	0	37	2	+35	15	2027 World Cup and 2028 Championship
2	Italy	5	4	0	1	32	7	+25	12	
3	Poland (H)	5	3	0	2	17	7	+10	9	
4	Croatia	5	2	0	3	10	25	−15	6	
5	Ukraine	5	0	1	4	3	22	−19	1	
6	Lithuania	5	0	1	4	4	40	−36	1	

Source: FIH
Rules for classification: 1) points; 2) matches won; 3) goal difference; 4) goals for; 5) head-to-head result; 6) field goals for.
(H) Hosts

=== Matches ===
All times are local (UTC+1)

27 July 2026
09:00

Ireland	11–1	Croatia
O'Connell 2', 3', 45'; Dale 9', 23', 38'; Williams 15+', 56', 57'; Thompson 26'; Mulvey 31'	Report	Hercigonja 47'

Umpires:
Marius Cuadrat (ESP)
Karolis Donculas (LTU)

27 July 2026
11:15

Italy	10–0	Ukraine
Palombi 7'; Iossa 13', 19', 38'; Faggian 15'; Carelli 15', 32', 33'; Biocca 16'; Atzori 19'	Report

Umpires:
Aaron Saunders (IRL)
Ignacy Blacha (POL)

27 July 2026
13:30

Poland	11–0	Lithuania
Sikorski 5'; Zieliński 11'; Juszczak 14', 47'; Bogalski 24'; Gumny 26'; Witczak 28', 41'; Rymer 33', 55'; Wolsztyński 44'	Report

Umpires:
Yevhen Stupachenko (UKR)
Thomas Hinsken (GER)

28 July 2026
14:30

Croatia	1–8	Italy
Matošević 24'	Report	Atzori 11', 48'; Carelli 11'; Faggian 13', 32', 50'; Palombi 16'; Biocca 26'

Umpires:
Marius Cuadrat (ESP)
Yevhen Stupachenko (UKR)

28 July 2026
16:45

Ireland	14–0	Lithuania
Cunningham 5', 26', 35'; O'Connell 10', 16', 39', 52'; Dale 17'; Archbold 31'; Walker 42'; McKee 58'; Thompson 59'; Fulton 60'; Dobson 60'	Report

Umpires:
Max Davidson (ENG)
Ignacy Blacha (POL)

28 July 2026
19:00

Poland	2–1	Ukraine
Gumny 40'; Juszczak 51'	Report	Riabchuk 42'

Umpires:
Aaron Saunders (IRL)
Karolis Donculas (LTU)

29 July 2026
14:30

Italy	1–4	Ireland
Faggian 11'	Report	O'Connell 8'; Le Quesne 34'; Ben Walker 37'; Dobson 58'

Umpires:
Thomas Hinsken (GER)
Max Davidson (ENG)

29 July 2026
16:45

Ukraine	1–1	Lithuania
Smaliukh 19'	Report	Sinkevičius 51'

Umpires:
Ignacy Blacha (POL)
Marius Cuadrat (ESP)

29 July 2026
19:00

Croatia	0–2	Poland
	Report	Witczak 45'; Gumny 60'

Umpires:
Yevhen Stupachenko (UKR)
Aaron Saunders (IRL)

31 July 2026
11:00

Ukraine	1–2	Croatia
Boiko 8'	Report	Matošević 49'; Hercigonja 54'

Umpires:
Karolis Donculas (LTU)
Ignacy Blacha (POL)

31 July 2026
13:15

Lithuania	0–8	Italy
	Report	Biocca 19', 26', 40', 58', 60'; Iossa 28', 42'; Bonimelli 30'

Umpires:
Aaron Saunders (IRL)
Maxwell Davidson (ENG)

31 July 2026
15:30

Poland	0–1	Ireland
	Report	Thompson 50'

Umpires:
Marius Cuadrat (ESP)
Thomas Hinsken (GER)

1 August 2026
09:15

Lithuania	3–6	Croatia
Vaikenas 1', 20'; Burkot 24'	Report	Prlić 9'; Acinger 13', 59'; Zidanić 18', 51', 51'

Umpires:
Thomas Hinsken (GER)
Yevhen Stupachenko (UKR)

1 August 2026
11:30

Ireland	7–0	Ukraine
Dale 19', 28', 37'; Fulton 28'; O'Connell 51', 59'; McKee 58'	Report

Umpires:
Maxwell Davidson (ENG)
Marius Cuadrat (ESP)

1 August 2026
13:45

Italy	5–2	Poland
Iossa 7'; Carelli 9', 38'; Palombi 15'; Faggian 31'	Report	Juszczak 45', 56'

Umpires:
Aaron Saunders (IRL)
Karolis Donculas (LTU)

== Championship II-B ==
2026 Men's EuroHockey U21 Championship II-B
Tournament details
- Host country: Czechia
- City: Plzeň
- Dates: 28 July – 1 August
- Teams: 4 (from 1 confederation)

Final positions
- Champions: Scotland (4th title)
- Runner-up: Czechia
- Third place: Wales

Tournament statistics
- Matches played: 8
- Goals scored: 46 (5.75 per match)
- Top scorer: (Wales) James Niven (5 goals)
- Best player: (Scotland) Jamie Green
- Best goalkeeper: (Scotland) Calum Douglas

The Championship II-B was held in Plzeň, Czechia from 28 July to 1 August 2026.

=== Preliminary round ===
==== Pool A ====
Pos	Team	Pld	W	D	L	GF	GA	GD	Pts	Qualification
1	Scotland	3	3	0	0	16	5	+11	9	Final
2	Czechia (H)	3	2	0	1	9	7	+2	6	Final
3	Wales	3	1	0	2	7	13	−6	3	Third place match
4	Turkey	3	0	0	3	5	12	−7	0	Third place match

Source: FIH
Rules for classification: 1) points; 2) matches won; 3) goal difference; 4) goals for; 5) head-to-head result; 6) field goals for.
(H) Hosts

All times are local (UTC+2)

28 July 2026
16:00

Scotland	7–1	Wales
Green 3', 57'; Hunt 14'; Austin 26'; Wilson 27', 39'; Love 41'	Report	Niven 13'

Umpires:
Tobias Chladek (CZE)
Neset Turhan (TUR)

28 July 2026
18:15

Turkey	1–3	Czechia
Keleş 35'	Report	Toms 33'; Hána 46'; Mušinský 49'

Umpires:
Ben Burton (SCO)
Jonathan Goold (WAL)

29 July 2026
16:00

Turkey	2–5	Scotland
Şahin 25'; Aydin 37'	Report	Austin 3', 16'; Duncan 17'; Stephen 27'; Flockhart 52'

Umpires:
Steven Bakker (NED)
Tobias Chladek (CZE)

29 July 2026
18:15

Wales	2–4	Czechia
Niven 9'; Lazarevic 20'	Report	Mušinský 15'; Hána 19'; Toms 35'; Holík 53'

Umpires:
Ben Burton (SCO)
Neset Turhan (TUR)

31 July 2026
10:00

Scotland	4–2	Czechia
Green 3', 20'; Love 25'; Millar 44'	Report	Šmíd 4'; Hána 49'

Umpires:
Jonathan Goold (WAL)
Neset Turhan (TUR)

31 July 2026
12:15

Wales	4–2	Turkey
Davies 10'; Niven 18'; Jones 54'; Rothwell 55'	Report	Aydin 20'; Öz 26'

Umpires:
Steven Bakker (NED)
Ben Burton (SCO)

=== Third place match ===
1 August 2026
10:00

Wales	4–2	Turkey
Cradden 7', 56'; Niven 38', 48'	Report	Ercan 6'; Koyuncu 30'

Umpires:
Ben Burton (SCO)
Tobias Chladek (CZE)

=== Final ===
1 August 2026
12:15

Scotland	3–0	Czechia
Love 13', 48'; Hunt 22'	Report

Umpires:
Steven Bakker (NED)
Jonathan Goold (WAL)

=== Final standings ===
Pos	Team	Qualification
1	Scotland (P)	2027 World Cup and 2028 Championship
2	Czechia	
3	Wales	
4	Turkey	

Source: FIH
(P) Promoted

== See also ==
- 2026 Women's EuroHockey U21 Championship II
- 2026 Men's EuroHockey U21 Championship
- 2026 Women's EuroHockey U21 Championship
