= 2019 Men's EuroHockey Junior Championship II =

Tournament details
- Host country: Czech Republic
- City: Plzeň
- Dates: 14–20 July
- Teams: 8 (from 1 confederation)
- Venue(s): TJ Litice

Final positions
- Champions: Scotland (3rd title)
- Runner-up: Russia
- Third place: Ireland

Tournament statistics
- Matches played: 20
- Goals scored: 131 (6.55 per match)
- Top scorer(s): (Italy) Manuel Mondo (9 goals)

The 2019 Men's EuroHockey Junior Championship II was the 11th edition of the Men's EuroHockey Junior Championship II, the second level of the men's European under-21 field hockey championships organized by the European Hockey Federation. It was held from 14 to 20 July 2019 in Plzeň, Czech Republic.

Scotland won their third EuroHockey Junior Championship II title and were promoted to the 2022 Men's EuroHockey Junior Championship together with the other finalists Russia.

== Qualified teams ==
The participating teams have qualified based on their final ranking from the 2017 competition.

Dates	Event	Location	Quotas	Qualifier(s)
28 August – 3 September 2017	2017 EuroHockey Junior Championship	Valencia, Spain	2	Ireland; Portugal
16–22 July 2017	2017 EuroHockey Junior Championship II	Saint Petersburg, Russia	5	Czech Republic; Italy; Russia; Scotland; Turkey
Decided by draw			1	Belarus
Total			8	

== Results ==
=== Preliminary round ===
==== Pool A ====
Pos	Team	Pld	W	D	L	GF	GA	GD	Pts	Qualification
1	Ireland	3	3	0	0	18	2	+16	9	Semi-finals
2	Turkey	3	2	0	1	8	8	0	6	Semi-finals
3	Belarus	3	1	0	2	5	9	−4	3	Relegation pool
4	Czech Republic (H)	3	0	0	3	3	15	−12	0	Relegation pool

Source: FIH
Rules for classification: 1) points; 2) matches won; 3) goal difference; 4) goals for; 5) head-to-head result; 6) field goals for.
(H) Hosts

14 July 2019
15:45

Ireland	3–1	Belarus
C. Empey 11'; Robson 21'; Crookshanks 26'	Report	Bandarchuk 18'

Umpires:
Greig Cunningham (SCO)
Jorge Santos (POR)

14 July 2019
18:00

Czech Republic	1–3	Turkey
Gerlický 38'	Report	Ataş 10'; Elagöz 41', 51'

Umpires:
Marc Knulle (FRA)
Nikita Yuklyaevskikh (RUS)

16 July 2019
15:45

Belarus	0–4	Turkey
	Report	Ataş 3'; Demirel 35'; Elagöz 40', 42'

Umpires:
Greig Cunningham (SCO)
Nikita Yuklyaevskikh (RUS)

16 July 2019
18:00

Czech Republic	0–8	Ireland
	Report	Flynn 11'; Samuel 17'; C. Empey 19', 50'; Robson 21'; Johnson 26'; Crookshanks 55'; Sarratt 57'

Umpires:
Andrei Saroka (BLR)
Jorge Santos (POR)

17 July 2019
15:45

Ireland	7–1	Turkey
Mawhinney 1'; Sarratt 3', 19', 50'; Robson 14'; A. Empey 24'; Johnson 55'	Report	Taşkaya 18'

Umpires:
Maarten Boxma (NED)
Enrico Zero (ITA)

17 July 2019
18:00

Belarus	4–2	Czech Republic
Tsaluika 19', 24'; Krot 37'; Belavusau 45'	Report	Gerlický 25'; Zuna 32'

Umpires:
Jorge Santos (POR)
Nikita Yuklyaevskikh (RUS)

==== Pool B ====
Pos	Team	Pld	W	D	L	GF	GA	GD	Pts	Qualification
1	Russia	3	2	0	1	15	8	+7	6	Semi-finals
2	Scotland	3	2	0	1	13	6	+7	6	Semi-finals
3	Italy	3	2	0	1	11	6	+5	6	Relegation pool
4	Portugal	3	0	0	3	2	21	−19	0	Relegation pool

Source: FIH
Rules for classification: 1) points; 2) matches won; 3) goal difference; 4) goals for; 5) head-to-head result; 6) field goals for.

14 July 2019
11:15

Scotland	6–1	Portugal
J. Golden 10'; Nairn 14'; C. Golden 38', 57', 59'; Walker 50'	Report	Ribeiro 6'

Umpires:
Maarten Boxma (NED)
Andrei Saroka (BLR)

14 July 2019
13:30

Russia	4–2	Italy
Ataev 28'; Arusiia 38'; Sobolevskiy 42', 49'	Report	Mondo 30+', 47'

Umpires:
Hakan Kanipek (TUR)
Ian Strange (IRE)

15 July 2019
15:45

Portugal	0–6	Italy
	Report	Mondo 8', 23'; Sior 16', 33', 39'; Lago 55'

Umpires:
Petr Větrovsky (CZE)
Hakan Kanipek (TUR)

15 July 2019
18:00

Russia	2–5	Scotland
Sobolevskiy 38', 59'	Report	C. Golden 21', 34'; J. Golden 55'; Nairn 56'; McConnell 59'

Umpires:
Enrico Zero (ITA)
Ian Strange (IRE)

17 July 2019
11:15

Scotland	2–3	Italy
C. Golden 44', 54'	Report	Mondo 5', 13'; Lago 19'

Umpires:
Marc Knulle (FRA)
Petr Větrovsky (CZE)

17 July 2019
13:30

Portugal	1–9	Russia
Caramalho 49'	Report	Kotkov 3', 58'; Sobolevskiy 6', 30', 57'; Arusiia 17', 39'; Starienko 35'; Agafontsev 56'

Umpires:
Hakan Kanipek (TUR)
Andrei Saroka (BLR)

=== Fifth to eighth place classification ===
==== Pool C ====
The points obtained in the preliminary round against the other team are taken over.

Pos	Team	Pld	W	D	L	GF	GA	GD	Pts	Relegation
5	Italy	3	3	0	0	13	0	+13	9	
6	Belarus	3	2	0	1	17	6	+11	6	
7	Czech Republic (H)	3	0	1	2	7	14	−7	1	
8	Portugal	3	0	1	2	7	24	−17	1	EuroHockey Junior Championship III

Source: FIH
Rules for classification: 1) points; 2) matches won; 3) goal difference; 4) goals for; 5) head-to-head result; 6) field goals for.
(H) Hosts

19 July 2019
10:15

Belarus	0–2	Italy
	Report	Mondo 32', 57'

Umpires:
Hakan Kanipek (TUR)
Petr Větrovsky (CZE)

19 July 2019
12:30

Czech Republic	5–5	Portugal
Griebl 27'; Gerlický 34', 41'; Sochor 49', 57'	Report	Ribeiro 5', 25'; Marques 12'; Castro 50'; Caramalho 52'

Umpires:
Marc Knulle (FRA)
Ian Strange (IRE)

20 July 2019
09:15

Belarus	13–2	Portugal
Mykush 7', 52'; Tsaluika 15', 30', 58'; Belavusau 19', 22'; Khatyliou 23', 30', 49'; Kochkin 25'; Trafimchuk 44', 45'	Report	Ribeiro 33', 42'

20 July 2019
11:30

Italy	5–0	Czech Republic
Mondo 6'; Brocco 10'; Ughetto 18'; Lago 19'; Garbaccio 59'	Report

Umpires:
Greig Cunningham (SCO)
Nikita Yuklyaevskikh (RUS)

=== First to fourth place classification ===
Semi-finals
19 July
Ireland	0
Scotland	1
19 July
Russia	5
Turkey	4

Final
20 July
Scotland	9
Russia	0
Third place
20 July
Ireland	4
Turkey	1

==== Semi-finals ====
19 July 2019
14:45

Ireland	0–1	Scotland
	Report	Roberts 8'

Umpires:
Maarten Boxma (NED)
Nikita Yuklyaevskikh (RUS)

19 July 2019
17:00

Russia	5–4	Turkey
Arusiia 3', 39', 46'; Sobolevskiy 14'; Starienko 21'	Report	Demirel 4', 15+', 50'; Elagöz 17'

Umpires:
Greig Cunningham (SCO)
Enrico Zero (ITA)

==== Third place game ====
20 July 2019
13:45

Ireland	4–1	Turkey
Sarratt 9', 60'; Robson 50'; A. Empey 52'	Report	Elagöz 29'

Umpires:
Jorge Santos (POR)
Petr Větrovsky (CZE)

==== Final ====
20 July 2019
16:00

Scotland	9–0	Russia
Roberts 2'; Walker 33'; J. Golden 38', 43', 47'; Jamieson 39'; Knoll 45+'; Nairn 56'; McConnell 60+'	Report

Umpires:
Maarten Boxma (NED)
Ian Strange (IRE)

== Final standings ==
Pos	Team	Pld	W	D	L	GF	GA	GD	Pts	Promotion or relegation
1	Scotland	5	4	0	1	23	6	+17	12	Promotion to the EuroHockey Junior Championship
2	Russia	5	3	0	2	20	21	−1	9	Promotion to the EuroHockey Junior Championship
3	Ireland	5	4	0	1	22	4	+18	12	
4	Turkey	5	2	0	3	13	17	−4	6	
5	Italy	5	4	0	1	18	6	+12	12	
6	Belarus	5	2	0	3	18	13	+5	6	
7	Czech Republic (H)	5	0	1	4	8	25	−17	1	
8	Portugal	5	0	1	4	9	39	−30	1	Relegation to the EuroHockey Junior Championship III

Source: FIH
(H) Hosts

== Goalscorers ==
There were 131 goals scored in 20 matches, for an average of 6.55 goals per match.

9 goals

- (Italy) Manuel Mondo

8 goals

- (Russia) Alexey Sobolevskiy

7 goals

- (Scotland) Cameron Golden

6 goals

- (Ireland) Guy Sarratt
- (Russia) Georgii Arusiia
- (Turkey) Müslüm Elagöz

5 goals

- (Belarus) Dzianis Tsaluika
- (Portugal) Vasco Ribeiro
- (Scotland) Jamie Golden

4 goals

- (Czech Republic) Eduard Gerlický
- (Ireland) Callum Robson
- (Turkey) Mehmet Demirel

3 goals

- (Belarus) Andrei Belavusau
- (Belarus) Dzianis Khatyliou
- (Ireland) Conor Empey
- (Italy) Pietro Lago
- (Italy) François Sior
- (Scotland) David Nairn

2 goals

- (Belarus) Aliaksandr Mykush
- (Belarus) Aliaksei Trafimchuk
- (Czech Republic) Ondřej Sochor
- (Ireland) Matthew Crookshanks
- (Ireland) Alistair Empey
- (Ireland) Benjamin Johnson
- (Portugal) Afonso Caramalho
- (Russia) Oleg Kotkov
- (Russia) Denis Starienko
- (Scotland) Andrew McConnell
- (Scotland) Hamish Roberts
- (Scotland) Struan Walker
- (Turkey) Furkan Ataş

1 goal

- (Belarus) Vadzim Bandarchuk
- (Belarus) Uladzislau Kochkin
- (Belarus) Dzmitry Krot
- (Czech Republic) Jakub Griebl
- (Czech Republic) Čenĕk Zuna
- (Ireland) Alex Flynn
- (Ireland) David Mawhinney
- (Ireland) Mark Samuel
- (Italy) Claudio Brocco
- (Italy) Marco Garbaccio
- (Italy) Alberto Ughetto
- (Portugal) Rodrigo Castro
- (Portugal) José Marques
- (Russia) Aleksandr Agafontsev
- (Russia) Artur Ataev
- (Scotland) Jack Jamieson
- (Scotland) Robert Knoll
- (Turkey) Mert Taşkaya

Source: FIH

== See also ==
- 2019 Men's EuroHockey Championship II
- 2019 Men's EuroHockey Junior Championship
- 2019 Men's EuroHockey Junior Championship III
- 2019 Women's EuroHockey Junior Championship II
