= 2026 Men's EuroHockey U21 Championship =

International field hockey competition

Tournament details
- Host country: Spain
- City: Valencia
- Dates: 26 July – 1 August
- Teams: 8 (from 1 confederation)

Final positions
- Champions: Netherlands (11th title)
- Runner-up: Germany
- Third place: Spain

Tournament statistics
- Matches played: 20
- Goals scored: 126 (6.3 per match)
- Top scorer(s): (Germany) Ben Hasbach (7 goals)
- Best player: (Netherlands) Joppe Wolbert
- Best goalkeeper: (Spain) Diego Palomero

The 2026 Men's EuroHockey U21 Championship was the 22nd edition of the Men's EuroHockey U21 Championship, the biennial international men's under-21 field hockey championship of Europe organised by the European Hockey Federation.

It was held alongside the women's tournament in Valencia, Spain from 26 July to 1 August 2026. It was the eighth time the tournament held in Spain and for the third time for Valencia. It was hosted at the newly opened Tarongers hockey field.

The hosts Spain were the defending champions. The top 6 teams qualified for the 2027 Junior World Cup. Netherlands won the title, beating Germany 4–1 and Spain ended with the bronze medal finish.

== Qualification ==
Participating nations qualified based on their final ranking from the 2024 competition.

Dates	Event	Location	Quotas	Qualifier(s)
14–20 July 2024	2024 EuroHockey U21 Championship	Terrassa, Spain	6	Belgium; England; France; Germany; Netherlands; Spain
15–20 July 2024	2024 EuroHockey U21 Championship II	Wałcz, Poland	1	Austria
15–20 July 2024	2024 EuroHockey U21 Championship II	Lausanne, Switzerland	1	Switzerland
Total			8	

== Preliminary round ==
=== Pool A ===
Pos	Team	Pld	W	D	L	GF	GA	GD	Pts	Qualification
1	Germany	3	3	0	0	15	2	+13	9	Semi-finals
2	Belgium	3	2	0	1	15	3	+12	6	Semi-finals
3	France	3	1	0	2	8	6	+2	3	Pool C
4	Switzerland	3	0	0	3	0	27	−27	0	Pool C

Source: FIH
Rules for classification: 1) points; 2) matches won; 3) goal difference; 4) goals for; 5) head-to-head result; 6) field goals for.

All times are local (UTC+1).

26 July 2026
09:40

France	6–0	Switzerland
Michaelis 2', 38'; Denis 10'; Delacroix 21', 22'; Piole 30'	Report

Umpires:
Lukasz Orzeł (POL)
Alia Raude (GER)

26 July 2026
12:20

Germany	2–1	Belgium
Glander 34'; Sanda 52'	Report	Langer 47'

Umpires:
Russell Donaldson (IRI)
Mark Becholz (NED)

27 July 2026
10:00

Belgium	12–0	Switzerland
Langer 8', 54' de Cleene 12', 19'; Lauwers 13', 53'; Francois 30', 44'; Langendries 37', 43', 52'; Dewitte 60'	Report

Umpires:
Mahmut Çilkiz (TUR)
Samuel Church (ENG)

27 July 2026
12:15

France	1–4	Germany
Plauche 16'	Report	Dammertz 8'; Hasbach 13'; Sanda 19', 40'

Umpires:
Benjamin Messerli (SUI)
Jesus Medinilla (ESP)

29 July 2026
09:40

Germany	9–0	Switzerland
Hasbach 6', 33', 42'; Scholz 20'; Geyer 23', 58'; Steinebach 27'; Duncker 28'; Sanda 32'	Report

Umpires:
Jesus Medinilla (ESP)
Emilia Lozano (ESP)

29 July 2026
10:00

Belgium	2–1	France
Hawaux 10', 60'	Report	Morcrette 9'

Umpires:
Samuel Church (ENG)
Mark Becholz (NED)

=== Pool B ===
Pos	Team	Pld	W	D	L	GF	GA	GD	Pts	Qualification
1	Netherlands	3	2	1	0	20	4	+16	7	Semi-finals
2	Spain (H)	3	2	0	1	13	7	+6	6	Semi-finals
3	England	3	0	2	1	8	10	−2	2	Pool C
4	Austria	3	0	1	2	2	22	−20	1	Pool C

Source: FIH
Rules for classification: 1) points; 2) matches won; 3) goal difference; 4) goals for; 5) head-to-head result; 6) field goals for.
(H) Hosts

All times are local (UTC+1).

26 July 2026
17:40

Netherlands	13–0	Austria
Van de Putte 6', 29'; Van der Valk 14', 44', 45'; Van der Heijden 18'; Thij. Bakker 22', 54'; Thie. Bakker 27', 51'; Veen 50'; Wolbert 58'; Corstens 58'	Report

Umpires:
Viv Carveth (ENG)
Ole Ingwersen (GER)

26 July 2026
20:20

Spain	5–3	England
Medina 4', 52'; Mena 8'; Gestí 25'; Martin 58'	Report	Draysey 28'; Bennett 33', 50'

Umpires:
Lucien Vanderborght (BEL)
Thalia Bellemans (BEL)

28 July 2026
18:00

England	2–2	Austria
Stamp 24'; Bennett 54'	Report	Anhaus 11'; Meisel 58'

Umpires:
Ales Vetrovsky (CZE)
Arlette Bloks (NED)

28 July 2026
20:15

Netherlands	4–1	Spain
Wolbert 18' van't Land 37' van de Putte 42'; Aalderen 43'	Report	Mena 15+'

Umpires:
Ole Ingwersen (GER)
Russell Donaldson (IRI)

29 July 2026
17:40

England	3–3	Netherlands
Dowds 5', 50'; Walker 52'	Report	Reyenga 24'; Wolbert 38', 50'

Umpires:
Ole Ingwersen (GER)
Lucien Vanderborght (BEL)

29 July 2026
18:00

Spain	7–0	Austria
Mustaros 6'; Serrahima 7'; Medina 27', 56'; Gesti 35', 51'; Martin 47'	Report

Umpires:
Sarah Craig (IRL)
Mahmut Çilkiz (TUR)

== Classification round ==
=== Pool C ===
Pos	Team	Pld	W	D	L	GF	GA	GD	Pts	Relegation
1	France	3	2	1	0	12	2	+10	7	
2	England	3	1	2	0	12	3	+9	5	
3	Austria	3	1	1	1	6	9	−3	4	Relegation to 2028 EuroHockey Junior Championship II
4	Switzerland	3	0	0	3	2	18	−16	0	Relegation to 2028 EuroHockey Junior Championship II

Source: FIH
Rules for classification: 1) points; 2) matches won; 3) goal difference; 4) goals for; 5) head-to-head result; 6) field goals for.

31 July 2026
09:40

Switzerland	2–3	Austria
Kraxner 2', 34'	Report	Meisel 16'; Kaiser 36'; Fink 55'

Umpires:
Samuel Church (ENG)
Ales Vetrovsky (CZE)

31 July 2026
12:00

France	1–1	England
Piole 26'	Report	Draysey 56'

Umpires:
Jesus Medinilla (ESP)
Russell Donaldson (IRI)

1 August 2026
09:30

France	5–1	Austria
Liddiard 3'; Denis 14'; Delacroix 30'; Plauche 50' van der Stok 60'	Report	Meisel 16'

Umpires:
Mark Becholz (NED)
Jesus Medinilla (ESP)

1 August 2026
09:50

England	9–0	Switzerland
Walker 5', 22'; Draysey 11', 15'; Lee 16'; Sturch-Hibbitt 30'; Smart 35'; Day 37'; Dowds 53'	Report

Umpires:
Mahmut Çilkiz (TUR)
Lucien Vanderborght (BEL)

== Medal round ==
=== Bracket ===
Semi-finals
31 July
Germany (p.s.o)	3 (2)
Spain	3 (1)
31 July
Netherlands	2
Belgium	1

Final
1 August
Germany	1
Netherlands	4
Third place
1 August
Spain	5
Belgium	4

=== Semi-finals ===
31 July 2026
10:00

Netherlands	2–1	Belgium
Corstens 15'; Wolbert 43'	Report	de Cleene 34'

Umpires:
Benjamin Messerli (SUI)
Ole Ingwersen (GER)

31 July 2026
12:20

Germany	3–3	Spain
Hasbach 7', 35', 54'	Report	Medina 18'; Martín 55'; Gesti 60'
Penalties
Stahmann (penalty shoot-out missed); Babic (penalty shoot-out missed); Geyer (penalty shoot-out missed); Duncker (penalty shoot-out missed); Hasbach (penalty shoot-out scored); Hasbach (penalty shoot-out scored)	2–1	(penalty shoot-out missed) Serrahima; (penalty shoot-out missed) Medina; (penalty shoot-out scored) Vilallonga; (penalty shoot-out missed) Trujillo; (penalty shoot-out missed) Mustaros; (penalty shoot-out missed) Serrahima

Umpires:
Lucien Vanderborght (BEL)
Mark Becholz (NED)

=== Third and fourth place ===
1 August 2026
11:50

Spain	5–4	Belgium
Mustaros 15'; Serrahima 25', 47'; Gesti 37', 60'	Report	Dewitte 29', 48'; Poels 44'; Kinnen 53'

Umpires:
Russell Donaldson (IRI)
Lukasz Orzeł (POL)

=== Final ===
1 August 2026
17:40

Germany	1–4	Netherlands
Babic 26'	Report	Veen 2'; Bakker 22'; Valk 44'; Putte 60'

Umpires:
Samuel Church (ENG)
Benjamin Messerli (SUI)

== Final standings ==
Pos	Team	Qualification or relegation
1st place, gold medalist(s)	Netherlands	Qualification for the 2027 Junior World Cup
2nd place, silver medalist(s)	Germany	Qualification for the 2027 Junior World Cup
3rd place, bronze medalist(s)	Spain (H)	Qualification for the 2027 Junior World Cup
4	Belgium	Qualification for the 2027 Junior World Cup
5	France	Qualification for the 2027 Junior World Cup
6	England	Qualification for the 2027 Junior World Cup
7	Austria (Q, R)	Qualification for the 2027 Junior World Cup & Relegation to the U21 Championship II
8	Switzerland (R)	Relegation to the U21 Championship II

Source: FIH
(H) Host; (Q) Qualified to the phase indicated; (R) Relegated

== See also ==
- 2026 Women's EuroHockey U21 Championship
- 2026 Men's EuroHockey U21 Championship II
- 2026 Women's EuroHockey U21 Championship II
