= 2024 Men's EuroHockey U21 Championship II =

Tournament details
- Host countries: Poland; Switzerland
- Dates: 15–20 July
- Teams: 11 (from 1 confederation)
- Venue: 2 (in 2 host cities)

Tournament statistics
- Matches played: 25
- Goals scored: 192 (7.68 per match)
- Top scorer: (Austria) Maximilian Kelner (11 goals)

The 2024 Men's EuroHockey U21 Championship II was the 13th edition of the Men's EuroHockey U21 Championship II, the second level of the men's European under-21 field hockey championships organised by the European Hockey Federation. This year there were two Championship II's held, namely Championship II-A and Championship II-B. Championship II-A was held in Wałcz, Poland from 15 to 24 July 2024, while Championship II-B was held in Lausanne, Switzerland at the same time.

The winners of both tournaments qualified for the 2026 EuroHockey U21 Championship and the 2025 FIH Hockey Junior World Cup.

== Qualified teams ==
Participating nations qualified based on their final ranking from the 2022 competition.

Dates	Event	Location	Quotas	Qualifier(s)
24–30 July 2022	2022 EuroHockey Junior Championship	Ghent, Belgium	2	Austria; Scotland
24–30 July 2022	2022 EuroHockey Junior Championship II	Plzeň, Czech Republic	4	Czech Republic; Italy; Poland; Wales
26–30 July 2022	2022 EuroHockey Junior Championship III	Helsinki, Finland	4	Finland; Lithuania; Switzerland; Ukraine
—N/a	New entry	—N/a	1	Luxembourg
Total			11	

== Championship II-A ==
2024 Men's EuroHockey U21 Championship II-A
Tournament details
- Host country: Poland
- City: Wałcz
- Dates: 15–20 July
- Teams: 6 (from 1 confederation)

Final positions
- Champions: Austria (2nd title)
- Runner-up: Poland
- Third place: Italy

Tournament statistics
- Matches played: 15
- Goals scored: 124 (8.27 per match)
- Top scorer: (Austria) Maximilian Kelner (11 goals)

The Championship II-A was held in Wałcz, Poland from 15 to 20 July 2024. Austria finished first in the round-robin tournament to win their second EuroHockey U21 Championship II title and qualified for the 2026 EuroHockey U21 Championship and 2025 Junior World Cup.

=== Standings ===
Pos	Team	Pld	W	D	L	GF	GA	GD	Pts	Qualification
1	Austria	5	5	0	0	36	10	+26	15	2026 Championship and 2025 World Cup
2	Poland (H)	5	3	1	1	34	14	+20	10	
3	Italy	5	3	1	1	19	12	+7	10	
4	Ukraine	5	2	0	3	14	13	+1	6	
5	Lithuania	5	1	0	4	17	34	−17	3	
6	Luxembourg	5	0	0	5	4	41	−37	0	

Source: FIH
Rules for classification: 1) points; 2) matches won; 3) goal difference; 4) goals for; 5) head-to-head result; 6) field goals for.
(H) Hosts

=== Matches ===
15 July 2024
09:00

Austria	13–0	Luxembourg
M. Kelner 2', 39'; J. Winkler 3'; Kaiser 6', 29'; B. Kelner 14', 29', 59'; Meisel 21', 36'; Schiesser 22'; Bauer 27'; Bräutigam 27'	Report

Umpires:
Maarten Boxma (NED)
Lukasz Orzeł (POL)

15 July 2024
11:15

Italy	1–0	Ukraine
Guiducci 57'	Report

Umpires:
Sarah Craig (IRL)
Bernhard Hajos (AUT)

15 July 2024
13:30

Poland	14–5	Lithuania
Gumny 2', 48'; Pawlak 14', 25', 34'; Cyprych 19', 32', 58'; Hołosyniuk 26', 51', 56'; Dąbrowski 42'; Kuźba 50'; Witczak 56'	Report	Sinkevičius 1', 35', 37', 45'; Milevič 9'

Umpires:
Alessio Fiorenza (ITA)
Vladyslav Mikhailiuk (UKR)

16 July 2024
14:30

Austria	6–1	Lithuania
Schiesser 22'; M. Kelner 25'; Winkler 29', 58'; Meisel 36', 48'	Report	Sinkevičius 44'

Umpires:
Maarten Boxma (NED)
Vladyslav Mikhailiuk (UKR)

16 July 2024
16:45

Luxembourg	0–4	Italy
	Report	Carelli 11', 57'; Iossa 19'; Palombi 29'

Umpires:
Lukasz Orzeł (POL)
Bernhard Hajos (AUT)

16 July 2024
19:00

Poland	3–2	Ukraine
Hołosyniuk 11'; Kuźba 17'; Wolsztyński 26'	Report	Hrubyi 37'; Cherniuk 60'

Umpires:
Sarah Craig (IRL)
Karolis Conculas (LTU)

17 July 2024
14:30

Italy	5–6	Austria
Arzenton 3'; Vici 29', 55'; Cavallini 30'; Iossa 59'	Report	Fink 1'; M. Kelner 25', 35', 44'; Scheiderbauer 50'; Winkler 57'

Umpires:
Karolis Donculas (LTU)
Maarten Boxma (NED)

17 July 2024
16:45

Ukraine	5–1	Lithuania
Hrubyi 14'; Cherniuk 31', 59'; Petrenko 45'; Boiko 50'	Report	Petkevič 23'

Umpires:
ALessio Fiorenza (ITA)
Lukasz Orzeł (POL)

17 July 2024
19:00

Luxembourg	1–13	Poland
Haesaerts 32'	Report	Hołosyniuk 11', 44', 58'; Pawlak 13', 35', 42', 56'; Mikołajczak 15'; Cyprych 21', 49'; Dąbrowski 38'; Gumny 41'; Kuźba 54'

Umpires:
Sarah Craig (IRL)
Vladyslav Mikhailiuk (UKR)

19 July 2024
09:00

Ukraine	5–1	Luxembourg
Petrenko 16'; Val 21'; Boiko 35', 56', 58'	Report	Clarinval 37'

Umpires:
Karolis Donculas (LTU)
Bernhard Hajos (AUT)

19 July 2024
11:15

Lithuania	4–7	Italy
Sinkevičius 29', 37', 49'; Petkevič 50'	Report	Palumbo 5'; Vici 25', 40'; Carelli 33', 46'; Cavallini 36'; Morbioni 59'

Umpires:
Lukasz Orzeł (POL)
Maarten Boxma (NED)

19 July 2024
13:30

Poland	2–4	Austria
Hołosyniuk 4'; Pawlak 59'	Report	M. Kelner 1', 5'; Nyckowiak 42'; Fink 48'

Umpires:
Sarah Craig (IRL)
Alessio Fiorenza (ITA)

20 July 2024
09:00

Lithuania	6–2	Luxembourg
Dikšas 4'; Vaikenas 10'; Stankevič 30'; Burkot 35'; Sinkevičius 42'; Petkevič 60'	Report	Singh 12'; Haesaerts 18'

Umpires:
Valdyslav Mikhailiuk (UKR)
Alessio Fiorenza (ITA)

20 July 2024
11:15

Austria	7–2	Ukraine
M. Kelner 5', 10', 42'; Schiesser 6'; Kaiser 13', 53'; Meisel 24'	Report	Tsymbaliuk 29'; Semeniushko 47'

Umpires:
Sarah Craig (IRL)
Karolis Donculas (LTU)

20 July 2024
13:30

Italy	2–2	Poland
Carelli 9'; Guiducci 19'	Report	Gumny 53'; Pawlak 56'

Umpires:
Maarten Boxma (NED)
Bernhard Hajos (AUT)

== Championship II-B ==
2024 Men's EuroHockey U21 Championship II-B
Tournament details
- Host country: Switzerland
- City: Lausanne
- Dates: 15–20 July
- Teams: 5 (from 1 confederation)

Final positions
- Champions: Switzerland (1st title)
- Runner-up: Scotland
- Third place: Czech Republic

Tournament statistics
- Matches played: 10
- Goals scored: 68 (6.8 per match)
- Top scorer: (Switzerland) Loris Grandchamp (10 goals)

The Championship II-B was held in Lausanne, Switzerland from 15 to 20 July 2024. The hosts Switzerland finished first in the round-robin tournament to win their first EuroHockey U21 Championship II title and qualified for the 2026 EuroHockey U21 Championship and 2025 Junior World Cup.

=== Standings ===
Pos	Team	Pld	W	D	L	GF	GA	GD	Pts	Qualification
1	Switzerland (H)	4	3	1	0	24	7	+17	10	2026 Championship and 2025 World Cup
2	Scotland	4	2	2	0	18	7	+11	8	
3	Czech Republic	4	2	0	2	13	15	−2	6	
4	Wales	4	1	1	2	12	12	0	4	
5	Finland	4	0	0	4	1	27	−26	0	

Source: FIH
Rules for classification: 1) points; 2) matches won; 3) goal difference; 4) goals for; 5) head-to-head result; 6) field goals for.
(H) Hosts

=== Matches ===
15 July 2024
15:45

Czech Republic	6–0	Finland
Homolka 5'; Lupač 33'; Janů 34'; Trejbal 39'; Papírek 40'; Plachý 50'	Report

Umpires:
Jake Charles (ENG)
Aidan Hankins (SUI)

15 July 2024
18:00

Wales	2–6	Switzerland
Wall 24'; Johnson 26'	Report	Grandchamp 21', 35', 48', 50'; Hug 57', 60'

Umpires:
Jamie Telfer (SCO)
Ales Vetrovsky (CZE)

16 July 2024
15:45

Scotland	4–0	Finland
Adams 24'; Galloway 35'; Campbell 43'; Austin 53'	Report

Umpires:
Jake Charles (ENG)
Ales Vetrovsky (CZE)

16 July 2024
18:00

Czech Republic	3–5	Switzerland
Janů 4'; Trebal 29'; Toms 44'	Report	Grandchamp 34', 39'; Flück 35'; Kraxner 46'; Gasser 50'

Umpires:
Kevin Roberts (WAL)
Christian Gibson (FIN)

17 July 2024
18:00

Wales	3–3	Scotland
Cradden 10'; Wall 25'; Bennett 42'	Report	Cahalin 3'; Douglas 49'; Galloway 58'

Umpires:
Jake Charles (ENG)
Christian Gibson (FIN)

18 July 2024
16:30

Switzerland	11–0	Finland
Gasser 6', 22'; Kraxner 13'; Grandchamp 26', 46', 54'; Fischbach 28'; Baumbach 32'; Hug 39'; Thijs 40', 57'	Report

Umpires:
Jamie Telfer (SCO)
Kevin Roberts (WAL)

19 July 2024
11:15

Czech Republic	2–9	Scotland
Homolka 41'; Janů 44'	Report	Galloway 4', 14', 20', 29'; Douglas 17'; Campbell 23'; Austin 30', 60'; Marsland 53'

Umpires:
Aidan Hankins (SUI)
Kevin Roberts (WAL)

19 July 2024
13:30

Finland	1–6	Wales
Könönen 32'	Report	Johnson 8'; Sutton 17'; Dyer 41'; George 48'; Bennett 49', 50'

Umpires:
Jake Charles (ENG)
Ales Vetrovsky (CZE)

20 July 2024
10:15

Wales	1–2	Czech Republic
Bennett 2'	Report	Šesták 50'; Plachý 60'

Umpires:
Jamie Telfer (SCO)
Aidan Hankins (SUI)

20 July 2024
12:30

Scotland	2–2	Switzerland
Caughey 30+'; Jack 47'	Report	Grandchamp 17'; Mohrhauer 41'

Umpires:
Jake Charles (ENG)
Ales Vetrovsky (CZE)

== See also ==
- 2024 Men's EuroHockey U21 Championship
- 2024 Women's EuroHockey U21 Championship II
