= Time in Spain =

Time in Europe: Light Blue / Western European Time / Greenwich Mean Time (UTC); Blue / Western European Time / Greenwich Mean Time (UTC); Blue / Western European Summer Time / British Summer Time / Irish Standard Time (UTC+1); Red / Central European Time (UTC+1); Red / Central European Summer Time (UTC+2); Yellow / Eastern European Time / Kaliningrad Time (UTC+2); Ochre / Eastern European Time (UTC+2); Ochre / Eastern European Summer Time (UTC+3); Green / Moscow Time / Turkey Time (UTC+3); Turquoise / Armenia Time / Azerbaijan Time / Georgia Time / Samara Time (UTC+4); Pink / Kazakhstan Time / Yekaterinburg Time (UTC+5); ▉▉▉▉ Pale hues: Standard time observed all year ▉▉▉ Dark hues: Daylight saving time

Time in Spain has two time zones. Spain mainly uses Central European Time (UTC+01:00) in Peninsular Spain, the Balearic Islands, Ceuta, and Melilla. In the Canary Islands, the time zone is Western European Time (UTC±00:00). In both territories, Daylight saving time is observed during summer months, meaning that mainland Spain uses Central European Summer Time (UTC+02:00), while the Canary Islands uses Western European Summer Time (UTC+01:00) between the last Sunday in March and the last Sunday in October.

Most of Spain used GMT (UTC±00:00) before the Second World War (with the Canary Islands using UTC−01:00). However, Spain adopted Central European Time in 1940 and continues to use it, with sunrise and sunset falling an hour later than GMT. Some observers believe that this time zone shift plays a role in the country's more unique daily schedule (late meals and sleep times) as compared with its European neighbors.

== History ==
=== Standard time adoption ===
Spain, like other parts of the world, used local mean time until 31 December 1900. In San Sebastián on 22 July 1900, the president of the Council of Ministers, Francisco Silvela, proposed to the regent of Spain, María Cristina, a royal decree to standardise the time in Spain; thus setting Greenwich Mean Time (UTC±00:00) as the standard time in peninsular Spain, the Balearic Islands and Ceuta and Melilla from 1 January 1901 onwards. The royal decree was sanctioned by María Cristina on 26 July 1900 in San Sebastián, the place where she resided during summer.

=== The Canary Islands exception ===
Before 1 March 1922, the Canary Islands still used mean solar time until it was discovered that the royal decree of 1900 applied only to the Peninsula and Balearic Islands. The Canary Islands then used a time 1 hour behind the rest of Spain; UTC−01:00, until 16 March 1940, and since then, they have used Western European Time (UTC±00:00).

It is very popular in Spanish national media, mainly on the radio and television, to mention the phrase "una hora menos en Canarias" (English: "one hour less in the Canary Islands") when the local time is mentioned. Usage of the phrase dates back to 1969 with the radio program Protagonistas, airing on Radio Nacional de España.

The natural time zone for the Canary Islands is UTC−01:00.

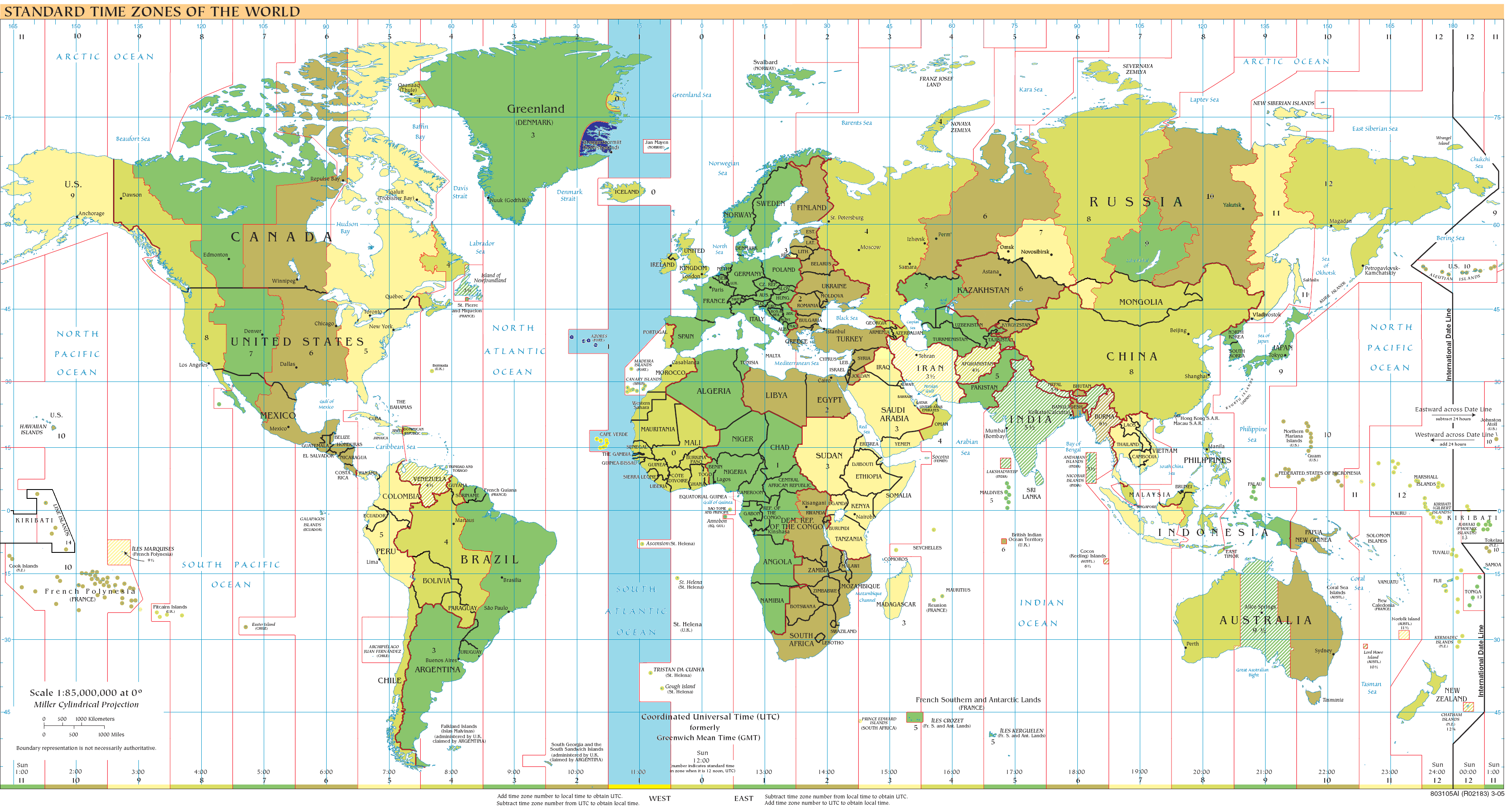
Canary Islands are located just in the middle of UTC−01:00 time zone.

=== Central European Time ===
In 1940, Francisco Franco changed the time zone by changing 16 March 1940 23:00 Greenwich Mean Time to 17 March 1940 00:00 Central European Time during World War II. This was made permanent in 1942 in order to be in line with German-occupied Europe. Several western European countries, including France, Belgium, and the Netherlands stayed on German time after the war in addition to Spain.

=== Criticism of the use of Central European Time ===
A Spanish advertisement offering breakfasts until 13:00 and meriendas (tea) from 17:00 to 20:00. It shows Spain's habit of late meals.

According to the original 24-hour division of the world, the nearest mean solar time zone is Greenwich Mean Time for all of mainland Spain – except the westernmost parts of the autonomous communities of Galicia (about three-quarters of the community), Extremadura and Andalusia – which corresponds with the UTC time zone. However, all of mainland Spain has used Central European Time (UTC+01:00) since 1940. At the time it was considered a temporary wartime decision that would be revoked a few years later, but the revocation never happened.

Some activists believe that the mismatch between Spain's clock time and solar time contributes to the country's unusual daily schedule. They believe that the relatively late sunrises and sunsets shift the average Spaniard's day later than it otherwise would be, and that a return to its original time zone would help boost productivity and bring family and work rhythms into better balance.

Some scientists, such as Jorge Mira of the University of Santiago de Compostela, argue against changing the time zone because it is likely that work schedules will also be regressed by one hour to align with solar time, resulting in no net effect in the long term; they fear disruption in the short term as Spaniards acclimatize to Greenwich time. Other countries at the same latitude as Spain, such as Japan, have similar time uses despite being closer to solar time; while countries in Northern Europe experience fewer hours of daylight and have shorter workdays.

In September 2013, the "Subcommittee to Study the Rationalisation of Hours, the Reconciliation of Personal, Family Life and Professional Life and Responsibility" (subcomisión para el estudio de la Racionalización de Horarios, la Conciliación de la Vida Personal, Familiar y Laboral y la Corresponsabilidad) of the Congress of Deputies made a report to the government of Spain proposing, among other things, a return to Greenwich Mean Time. The subcommittee considered that this time zone change would have a favourable effect, allowing more time for family, training, personal life, leisure, and avoiding downtime during the workday. The proposals are aimed at improving Spanish labour productivity as well as better adjusting schedules to family and work life.

=== The Galicia problem ===
In Galicia, the westernmost region of mainland Spain, the difference between the official local time and the mean solar time is about two and a half hours during summer time. There have been political pushes to change the official time so that, as in Portugal, it is one hour in advance of the zone standard time. This would involve switching to WET and making the time similar to that in Portugal, with which it shares the same longitude. For example, in Vigo (located 35 time minutes west of Greenwich), at the summer solstice (june 21st), noon is at around 14:40 and sunset is around 22:15 local time, while in Menorca sunset is around 21:20.

== IANA time zone database ==
The IANA time zone database contains 3 zones for Spain. Columns marked with * are from the file zone.tab from the database.

c.c.*	coordinates*	TZ*	comments*	UTC offset	UTC DST offset	Notes
ES	+4024−00341	Europe/Madrid	Spain (mainland)	+01:00	+02:00	and Balearic Islands
ES	+3553−00519	Africa/Ceuta	Ceuta, Melilla	+01:00	+02:00	and plazas de soberanía
ES	+2806−01524	Atlantic/Canary	Canary Islands	+00:00	+01:00	

== Differences with neighbouring countries ==
Spain has borders with four countries: Portugal, France, Andorra, and Morocco; as well as with the British Overseas Territory of Gibraltar. As Portugal, unlike Spain, uses WET (UTC±00:00) (WEST (UTC+01:00) during the summer), clocks need to be set 1 hour earlier after crossing the borders from Spain into Portugal.

== See also ==
- Catalan time system
- List of time zones
