= 2022 Men's EuroHockey Junior Championship II =

Tournament details
- Host country: Czech Republic
- City: Plzeň
- Dates: 24–30 July
- Teams: 6 (from 1 confederation)
- Venue: TJ Plzeň Litice

Final positions
- Champions: Ireland (3rd title)
- Runner-up: Turkey
- Third place: Wales

Tournament statistics
- Matches played: 15
- Goals scored: 54 (3.6 per match)
- Top scorer: (Ireland) Adam Walker (5 goals)
- Best player: (Turkey) Müslüm Ekinci
- Best goalkeeper: (Czech Republic) Vojtěch Pažitka

The 2022 Men's EuroHockey Junior Championship II was the 12th edition of the Men's EuroHockey Junior Championship II, the second level of the men's European under-21 field hockey championships organised by the European Hockey Federation. It was held in Plzeň, Czech Republic from 24 to 30 July 2022. The tournament was originally scheduled to be held in Rakovník but a venue change was required due construction works at the initial venue.

== Qualified teams ==
Participating nations qualified based on their final ranking from the 2019 competition.

Dates	Event	Location	Quotas	Qualifiers
15–21 July 2019	2019 EuroHockey Junior Championship	Valencia, Spain	1	Poland
14–20 July 2019	2019 EuroHockey Junior Championship II	Plzeň, Czech Republic	4	~~Belarus~~ (Note: Belarus was excluded due to their involvement in the 2022 Russian invasion of Ukraine); Czech Republic; Ireland; Italy; Turkey
18–21 July 2019	2019 EuroHockey Junior Championship III	Vilnius, Lithuania	1	Wales
Total			6	

== Results ==
=== Standings ===
Pos	Team	Pld	W	D	L	GF	GA	GD	Pts	Promotion
1	Ireland (P)	5	3	2	0	16	6	+10	11	EuroHockey Junior Championship
2	Turkey (P)	5	2	2	1	7	7	0	8	EuroHockey Junior Championship
3	Wales	5	2	1	2	9	7	+2	7	
4	Poland	5	2	0	3	6	14	−8	6	
5	Italy	5	1	2	2	8	9	−1	5	
6	Czech Republic (H)	5	1	1	3	8	11	−3	4	

Source: FIH
Rules for classification: 1) points; 2) matches won; 3) goal difference; 4) goals for; 5) head-to-head result; 6) field goals for.
(H) Hosts; (P) Promoted

=== Matches ===
24 July 2022
11:30

Ireland	2–2	Turkey
Duggan 37'; Filgas 41'	Report	Kayar 42', 51'

Umpires:
Mariusz Orzeł (POL)
Luke Rees (WAL)

24 July 2022
13:45

Poland	0–2	Italy
	Report	Muzzioli 6'; C. Brocco 44'

Umpires:
Rob Argent (IRL)
Luka Zupancic (AUT)

24 July 2022
16:00

Wales	3–1	Czech Republic
Collins 22'; Newbold 41'; Lloyd 58'	Report	Vitošek 27'

Umpires:
Mahmut Çilkiz (TUR)
Kamaal Khan (ITA)

25 July 2022
13:30

Turkey	0–2	Poland
	Report	Blaszkiewicz 38'; Zaworski 59'

Umpires:
Rob Argent (IRL)
Luke Rees (WAL)

25 July 2022
15:45

Wales	3–1	Italy
Bennett 27', 38'; Newbold 40'	Report	Cavallini 50'

Umpires:
Luka Zupancic (AUT)
Petr Větrovsky (CZE)

25 July 2022
18:00

Ireland	3–2	Czech Republic
Rowe 6'; Walker 10', 39'	Report	Trejbal 8'; Branšovský 50'

Umpires:
Kamaal Khan (ITA)
Mariusz Orzeł (POL)

27 July 2022
13:30

Turkey	2–1	Wales
Ekinci 40', 43'	Report	Collins 47'

Umpires:
Luka Zupancic (AUT)
Kamaal Khan (ITA)

27 July 2022
15:45

Poland	0–8	Ireland
	Report	Walker 5', 11'; Kidd 25', 38', 42'; Rowe 39', 60'; Jennings 48'

Umpires:
Luke Rees (WAL)
Petr Větrovsky (CZE)

27 July 2022
18:00

Italy	2–2	Czech Republic
C. Brocco 2'; Arosio 14'	Report	Brzák 49'; Bystřický 59'

Umpires:
Mahmut Çilkiz (TUR)
Rob Argent (IRL)

29 July 2022
10:30

Italy	2–2	Turkey
Muzzioli 2', 14'	Report	Kayar 34'; Ekinci 57'

Umpires:
Rob Argent (IRL)
Mariusz Orzeł (POL)

29 July 2022
12:45

Wales	1–1	Ireland
Lloyd 32'	Report	Walker 45'

Umpires:
Luka Zupancic (AUT)
Petr Větrovsky (CZE)

29 July 2022
16:00

Czech Republic	3–2	Poland
Plachý 11', 11'; Soukup 50'	Report	Blaszkiewicz 15'; Zaworski 16'

Umpires:
Mahmut Çilkiz (TUR)
Kamaal Khan (ITA)

30 July 2022
10:00

Ireland	2–1	Italy
Kidd 7'; Ruttle 59'	Report	Dionisi Vici 23'

Umpires:
Mariusz Orzeł (POL)
Mahmut Çilkiz (TUR)

30 July 2022
12:15

Czech Republic	0–1	Turkey
	Report	Kayar 50'

Umpires:
Luka Zupancic (AUT)
Luke Rees (WAL)

30 July 2022
14:30

Poland	2–1	Wales
Zaworski 37'; Jaroszewski 52'	Report	Welsh 44'

Umpires:
Rob Argent (IRL)
Petr Větrovsky (CZE)

== Statistics ==
=== Goalscorers ===
There have been 54 goals scored in 15 matches, for an average of 3.6 goals per match.

5 goals

- (Ireland) Adam Walker

4 goals

- (Ireland) Oliver Kidd
- (Turkey) Ramazan Kayar

3 goals

- (Ireland) Louis Rowe
- (Italy) Alessandro Muzzioli
- (Poland) Bartosz Zaworski
- (Turkey) Müslüm Ekinci

2 goals

- (Czech Republic) Martin Plachý
- (Italy) Claudio Brocco
- (Poland) Julian Blaszkiewicz
- (Wales) Billy Collins
- (Wales) Fred Newbold
- (Wales) Owen Lloyd
- (Wales) John Bennett

1 goal

- (Czech Republic) Tomáš Branšovský
- (Czech Republic) Jan Brzák
- (Czech Republic) Dominik Bystřický
- (Czech Republic) Vít Soukup
- (Czech Republic) Josef Trejbal
- (Czech Republic) Jan Vitošek
- (Ireland) Mark Duggan
- (Ireland) Josh Filgas
- (Ireland) Evan Jennings
- (Italy) Davide Arosio
- (Italy) Daniele Cavallini
- (Italy) Felix Dionisi Vici
- (Poland) Oskar Jaroszewski
- (Wales) Sam Welsh

Source: FIH

== See also ==
- 2022 Men's EuroHockey Junior Championship
- 2022 Men's EuroHockey Junior Championship III
- 2022 Women's EuroHockey Junior Championship II
