= 2022 Men's EuroHockey Junior Championship III =

Tournament details
- Host country: Finland
- City: Helsinki
- Dates: 26–30 July
- Teams: 4 (from 1 confederation)
- Venue: Helsinki Velodrome

Final positions
- Champions: Switzerland (2nd title)
- Runner-up: Ukraine
- Third place: Lithuania

Tournament statistics
- Matches played: 8
- Goals scored: 54 (6.75 per match)
- Top scorer: (Lithuania) Rafael Stankevič (7 goals)

The 2022 Men's EuroHockey Junior Championship III was the 11th edition of the Men's EuroHockey Junior Championship III, the third level of the men's European under-21 field hockey championships organized by the European Hockey Federation. It was held at the Helsinki Velodrome in Helsinki, Finland from 26 to 30 July 2022.

Switzerland won their second Men's EuroHockey Junior Championship III title by defeating Ukraine 3–2 in the final and were promoted to the EuroHockey Junior Championship II in 2024. Lithuania won the bronze medal by defeating the hosts Finland 12–2.

== Preliminary round ==
=== Pool A ===
Pos	Team	Pld	W	D	L	GF	GA	GD	Pts	Qualification
1	Ukraine	3	2	1	0	13	2	+11	7	Final
2	Switzerland	3	2	1	0	13	2	+11	7	Final
3	Lithuania	3	1	0	2	9	7	+2	3	Third place match
4	Finland (H)	3	0	0	3	0	24	−24	0	Third place match

Source: FIH
Rules for classification: 1) points; 2) matches won; 3) goal difference; 4) goals for; 5) head-to-head result; 6) field goals for.
(H) Hosts

26 July 2022
15:45

Ukraine	4–1	Lithuania
Popov 22'; Tsybulia 27'; Zhmereniuk 28'; Kostechko 38'	Report	Stankevič 34'

Umpires:
Christian Gibson (FIN)
Simo Makela (FIN)

26 July 2022
18:00

Switzerland	9–0	Finland
Flück 7'; Grandchamp 12', 21', 44'; Hug 17'; Mohrhauer 26'; Brunold 31'; Kraxner 37'; Gloor 46'	Report

Umpires:
Lubos Kamendy (SVK)
Maksym Perepelytsya (UKR)

27 July 2022
15:45

Switzerland	1–1	Ukraine
Grandchamp 36'	Report	Berhilevych 33'

Umpires:
Lubos Kamendy (SVK)
Simo Makela (FIN)

27 July 2022
18:00

Lithuania	7–0	Finland
Sinkevičius 8'; Stankevič 12', 60'; Burkot 23'; Blažys 32'; Vaikenas 41'; Ridlauskas 57'	Report

Umpires:
Maksym Perepelytsya (UKR)
Christian Gibson (FIN)

29 July 2022
11:15

Lithuania	1–3	Switzerland
Ridlauskas 8'	Report	Grandchamp 2'; Flück 26'; Kraxner 52'

Umpires:
Simo Makelo (FIN)
Maksym Perepelytsya (UKR)

29 July 2022
13:30

Ukraine	8–0	Finland
Popov 2'; Berhilevych 6'; Cherniuk 14', 57'; Hrubyi 31', 48'; Riabchuk 32'; Tsybulia 58'	Report

Umpires:
Christian Gibson (FIN)
Lubos Kamendy (SVK)

== Classification round ==
=== Third place match ===
30 July 2022
10:15

Lithuania	12–2	Finland
Ridlauskas 6'; Sinkevičius 7', 59'; Stankevič 29', 40', 49', 57'; Burkot 33', 60'; Ustinovičius 44'; Kazragis 55'; Buzys 56'	Report	Määtänen 27'; Taipale 56'

Umpires:
Simo Makelo (FIN)
Maksym Perepelytsya (UKR)

=== Final ===
30 July 2022
12:30

Ukraine	2–3	Switzerland
Hrubyi 28'; Cherniuk 60'	Report	Grandchamp 2'; Flück 37'; Mohrhauer 39'

Umpires:
Christian Gibson (FIN)
Lubos Kamendy (SVK)

== Statistics ==
=== Final standings ===
Pos	Team	Promotion
1	Switzerland (P)	EuroHockey Junior Championship II
2	Ukraine	
3	Lithuania	
4	Finland (H)	

Source: FIH
(H) Host; (P) Promoted

=== Goalscorers ===
There were 54 goals scored in 8 matches, for an average of 6.75 goals per match.

7 goals

- (Lithuania) Rafal Stankevič

6 goals

- (Switzerland) Loris Grandchamp

3 goals

- (Lithuania) Andžej Burkot
- (Lithuania) Arnas Ridlauskas
- (Lithuania) Povilas Sinkevičius
- (Switzerland) Jens Flück
- (Ukraine) Vladyslav Cherniuk
- (Ukraine) Dmytro Hrubyi

2 goals

- (Switzerland) Léonard Kraxner
- (Switzerland) Matthias Mohrhauer
- (Ukraine) Yaroslav Berhilevych
- (Ukraine) Oleksii Popov
- (Ukraine) Vladyslav Tsybulia

1 goal

- (Finland) Santeri Määtänen
- (Finland) Otto Taipale
- (Lithuania) Justinas Blažys
- (Lithuania) Martynas Buzys
- (Lithuania) Renaldas Kazragis
- (Lithuania) Ernestas Ustinovičius
- (Lithuania) Dominykas Vaikenas
- (Switzerland) Alessio Brunold
- (Switzerland) Valentin Gloor
- (Switzerland) Yannick Hug
- (Ukraine) Volodymyr Kostechko
- (Ukraine) Serhii Riabchuk
- (Ukraine) Volodymyr Zhmereniuk

Source: FIH

== See also ==
- 2022 Men's EuroHockey Junior Championship II
- 2022 Women's EuroHockey Junior Championship III
