= Men's EuroHockey U21 Championship =

EHF international field hockey competition

- Current season, competition or edition: 2026 Men's EuroHockey U21 Championship
- Formerly: Men's EuroHockey Junior Championship
- Sport: Field hockey
- Founded: 1976; 50 years ago
- First season: 1976
- No. of teams: 8
- Confederation: EHF (Europe)
- Most recent champion: Netherlands (11th title) (2026)
- Most titles: Netherlands (11 titles)
- Level on pyramid: 1
- Relegation to: EuroHockey U21 Championship II

The Men's EuroHockey U21 Championship is a men's international under-21 field hockey tournament organized by the European Hockey Federation. The tournament has been held since 1977 and serves as a qualification tournament for the Men's FIH Hockey Junior World Cup.

In June 2023, the tournament was renamed from the Men's EuroHockey Junior Championship to the Men's EuroHockey U21 Championship.

== Competition format ==
The tournament usually comprises 8 teams, while some editions have featured more and less.

Teams are split into two pools, playing in a round-robin format. The top two teams in each pool move forward to contest the medal matches, while the bottom two (or more) teams playoff to avoid relegation to the EuroHockey Junior Championship II.

== Championship I ==
=== Results ===
Year	Host	Final			Third place match			Number of teams
Year	Host	Winner	Score	Runner-up	Third place	Score	Fourth place	Number of teams
1976; Details	Hamburg, West Germany	Netherlands	2–0	Spain	West Germany	2–1	Poland	8
1977; Details	Folkestone, England	West Germany	4–3	Netherlands	Spain	1–0	England	8
1978; Details	Dublin, Ireland	Netherlands	6–2	Ireland	West Germany		France	8
1981; Details	Barcelona, Spain	West Germany	2–1	Belgium	Netherlands	4–2	Spain	8
1984; Details	Rome, Italy	West Germany	3–2	Netherlands	France	2–1	Belgium	8
1988; Details	Santander, Spain	West Germany	3–0	England	Netherlands	2–1	Spain	8
1992; Details	Vught, Netherlands	Netherlands		Spain	Germany		England	8
1996; Details	Vejle, Denmark	Netherlands	3–2	Germany	England	2–2 (a.e.t.) (6–4 p.s.)	Spain	8
1998; Details	Poznań, Poland	Germany	3–2	England	Netherlands	3–3 (a.e.t.) (4–2 p.s.)	Spain	8
2000; Details	Madrid, Spain	Spain	4–4 (a.e.t.) (4–3 p.s.)	Germany	Netherlands	7–2	England	8
2002; Details	Lausanne, Switzerland	Netherlands		Germany	Spain		England	8
2004; Details	Nivelles, Belgium	Spain		Germany	Netherlands		England	8
2006; Details	Prague, Czech Republic	Netherlands		Germany	Belgium		Spain	8
2008; Details	San Sebastián, Spain	Spain	1–0 (a.e.t.)	Netherlands	Germany	4–3	Belgium	8
2010; Details	Siemianowice Śląskie, Poland	Netherlands	4–1	Belgium	Germany	4–3	England	8
2012; Details	's-Hertogenbosch, Netherlands	Belgium	2–2 (3–2 s.o.)	Netherlands	Germany	8–0	France	8
2014; Details	Waterloo, Belgium	Netherlands	5–2	Germany	England	1–1 (4–3 s.o.)	Belgium	8
2017; Details	Valencia, Spain	Netherlands	2–2 (5–3 s.o.)	Belgium	Germany	Match cancelled	Spain	8
2019; Details	Valencia, Spain	Germany	5–3	England	Netherlands	3–1	Spain	8
2022; Details	Ghent, Belgium	Netherlands	3–1	Germany	Belgium	3–1	Spain	8
2024; Details	Terrassa, Spain	Spain	3–1	Netherlands	Belgium	4–3	Germany	8
2026; Details	Valencia, Spain	Netherlands	4–1	Germany	Spain	5–4	Belgium	8

=== Summary ===
Team	Winners	Runners-up	Third place	Fourth place
Netherlands	11 (1976, 1978, 1992*, 1996, 2002, 2006, 2010, 2014, 2017, 2022, 2026)	5 (1977, 1984, 2008, 2012*, 2024)	6 (1981, 1988, 1998, 2000, 2004, 2019)	
Germany (Note: Includes results representing West Germany between 1976 and 1988)	6 (1977, 1981, 1984, 1988, 1998, 2019)	8 (1996, 2000, 2002, 2004, 2006, 2014, 2022, 2026)	7 (1976*, 1978, 1992, 2008, 2010, 2012, 2017)	1 (2024)
Spain	4 (2000*, 2004, 2008*, 2024*)	2 (1976, 1992)	3 (1977, 2002, 2026*)	8 (1981*, 1988*, 1996, 1998, 2006, 2017*, 2019*, 2022)
Belgium	1 (2012)	3 (1981, 2010, 2017)	3 (2006, 2022*, 2024)	4 (1984, 2008, 2014*, 2026)
England		3 (1988, 1998, 2019)	2 (1996, 2014)	6 (1977*, 1992, 2000, 2002, 2004, 2010)
Ireland		1 (1978*)		
France			1 (1984)	2 (1978, 2012)
Poland				1 (1976)

* = hosts

=== Team appearances ===
Team	(West Germany) 1976	(England) 1977	(Ireland) 1978	(Spain) 1981	(Italy) 1984	(Spain) 1988	(Netherlands) 1992	(Denmark) 1996	(Poland) 1998	(Spain) 2000	(Switzerland) 2002	(Belgium) 2004	(Czech Republic) 2006	(Spain) 2008	(Poland) 2010	(Netherlands) 2012	(Belgium) 2014	(Spain) 2017	(Spain) 2019	(Belgium) 2022	(Spain) 2024	(Spain) 2026	Total
Austria	–	–	–	–	–	7th	–	–	8th	–	–	–	–	8th	–	–	6th	6th	8th	7th	–	7th	8
Belgium	5th	–	6th	2nd	4th	–	–	5th	6th	–	6th	5th	3rd	4th	2nd	1st	4th	2nd	5th	3rd	3rd	4th	18
Czech Republic	Part of Czechoslovakia						8th	7th	–	–	7th	–	7th	–	–	–	–	–	–	–	–	–	4
Denmark	–	–	–	–	–	–	–	8th	–	–	–	–	–	–	–	–	–	–	–	–	–	–	1
England	–	4th	7th	7th	5th	2nd	4th	3rd	2nd	4th	4th	4th	5th	5th	4th	5th	3rd	5th	2nd	6th	5th	6th	21
France	7th	–	4th	8th	3rd	–	–	–	–	6th	–	–	–	–	5th	4th	7th	–	6th	5th	6th	5th	12
Germany	3rd	1st	3rd	1st	1st	1st	3rd	2nd	1st	2nd	2nd	2nd	2nd	3rd	3rd	3rd	2nd	3rd	1st	2nd	4th	2nd	22
Gibraltar	–	–	–	–	8th	–	–	–	–	–	–	–	–	–	–	–	–	–	–	–	–	–	1
Italy	–	–	–	–	6th	–	–	6th	–	8th	–	–	–	–	–	–	–	–	–	–	–	–	3
Ireland	6th	8th	2nd	5th	7th	–	–	–	–	7th	–	8th	–	–	–	–	–	7th	–	–	7th	–	9
Netherlands	1st	2nd	1st	3rd	2nd	3rd	1st	1st	3rd	3rd	1st	3rd	1st	2nd	1st	2nd	1st	1st	3rd	1st	2nd	1st	22
Poland	4th	–	–	–	–	6th	–	–	7th	–	–	6th	6th	6th	8th	–	8th	–	7th	–	–	–	9
Portugal	–	6th	–	–	–	–	–	–	–	–	–	–	–	–	–	–	–	8th	–	–	–	–	2
Russia	Part of the Soviet Union							–	–	–	–	–	8th	–	7th	–	–	–	–	DSQ	–	–	2
Scotland	–	7th	–	–	–	8th	5th	–	5th	5th	5th	7th	–	7th	–	7th	–	–	–	8th	–	–	10
Soviet Union	–	5th	8th	6th	–	5th	–	Defunct															4
Spain	2nd	3rd	5th	4th	–	4th	2nd	4th	4th	1st	3rd	1st	4th	1st	6th	6th	5th	4th	4th	4th	1st	3rd	21
Switzerland	–	–	–	–	–	–	7th	–	–	–	8th	–	–	–	–	–	–	–	–	–	–	8th	3
Turkey	–	–	–	–	–	–	–	–	–	–	–	–	–	–	–	–	–	–	–	–	8th	–	1
Wales	8th	–	–	–	–	–	6th	–	–	–	–	–	–	–	–	8th	–	–	–	–	–	–	3
Total	8	8	8	8	8	8	8	8	8	8	8	8	8	8	8	8	8	8	8	8	8	8	

== Championship II ==
The Men's EuroHockey U21 Championship II is the second level of the Men's EuroHockey U21 Championships. The format changed in 2024 and means that there is no U21 Championship II with 8 teams and a U21 Championship III with the remaining teams anymore. These 2 events are combined into a U21 Championship II-A and II-B, which are effectively played at the same level. From both events the winner are promoted to the U21 Championship.

=== Results ===
Year	Host	Final			Third place match			Number of teams
Year	Host	Winner	Score	Runner-up	Third place	Score	Fourth place	Number of teams
1998; Details	Padua, Italy	Ireland		France	Italy		Wales	8
2000; Details	Vienna, Austria	Belgium		Czech Republic	Switzerland		Austria	8
2002; Details	Cagliari, Italy	Poland		Ireland	France		Italy	7
2004; Details	Lousada, Portugal	Czech Republic		Russia	France		Switzerland	8
2006; Details	Gibraltar	Scotland		Austria	France		Wales	8
2008; Details	Bra, Italy	Russia		France	Belarus		Italy	10
2010; Details	Vienna, Austria	Scotland		Wales	Austria		Czech Republic	8
2012; Details	Cernusco sul Naviglio, Italy	Austria	4–2	Poland	Russia	6–1	Ukraine	8
2014; Details	Lousada, Portugal	Ireland	Round-robin	Portugal	Scotland	Round-robin	Italy	7
2017; Details	Saint Petersburg, Russia	France	3–0	Poland	Scotland	4–3	Czech Republic	8
2019; Details	Plzeň, Czech Republic	Scotland	9–0	Russia	Ireland	4–1	Turkey	8
2022; Details	Plzeň, Czech Republic	Ireland	Round-robin	Turkey	Wales	Round-robin	Poland	6
2024; Details	Wałcz, Poland	Austria	Round-robin	Poland	Italy	Round-robin	Ukraine	6
2024; Details	Lausanne, Switzerland	Switzerland	Round-robin	Scotland	Czech Republic	Round-robin	Wales	5
2026; Details	Poznań, Poland	Ireland	Round-robin	Italy	Poland	Round-robin	Croatia	6
2026; Details	Plzeň, Czech Republic	Scotland	3–0	Czech Republic	Wales	4–2	Turkey	4

=== Summary ===
Team	Winners	Runners-up	Third place	Fourth place
Scotland	4 (2006, 2010, 2019, 2026 B)	1 (2024 B)	2 (2014, 2017)	
Ireland	4 (1998, 2014, 2022, 2026 A)	1 (2002)	1 (2019)	
Austria	2 (2012, 2024 A)	1 (2006)	1 (2010*)	1 (2000*)
Poland	1 (2002)	3 (2012, 2017, 2024 A*)	1 (2026 A*)	1 (2022)
France	1 (2017)	2 (1998, 2008)	3 (2002, 2004, 2006)	
Czech Republic	1 (2004)	2 (2000, 2026 B*)	1 (2024 B)	2 (2010, 2017)
Russia	1 (2008)	2 (2004, 2019)	1 (2012)	
Switzerland	1 (2024 B*)		1 (2000)	1 (2004)
Belgium	1 (2000)			
Wales		1 (2010)	2 (2022, 2026 B)	3 (1998, 2006, 2024 B)
Italy		1 (2026 A)	2 (1998*, 2024 A)	3 (2002*, 2008*, 2014)
Turkey		1 (2022)		2 (2019, 2026 B)
Portugal		1 (2014*)		
Belarus			1 (2008)	
Ukraine				2 (2012, 2024 A)
Croatia				1 (2026 A)

* = hosts

=== Team appearances ===
Team	(Italy) 1998	(Austria) 2000	(Italy) 2002	(Portugal) 2004	(Gibraltar) 2006	(Italy) 2008	(Austria) 2010	(Italy) 2012	(Portugal) 2014	(Russia) 2017	(Czech Republic) 2019	(Czech Republic) 2022	(Poland) (Switzerland) 2024	(Poland) (Czech Republic) 2026	Total
Austria	–	4th	–	–	2nd	–	3rd	1st	–	–	–	–	1st	–	4
Azerbaijan	–	–	–	–	–	9th	8th	–	–	–	–	–	–	–	2
Belarus	–	–	–	–	–	3rd	6th	7th	7th	–	6th	DSQ	–	–	5
Belgium	–	1st	–	–	–	–	–	–	–	–	–	–	–	–	1
Croatia	–	–	5th	7th	–	–	–	–	–	–	–	–	–	4th	3
Czech Republic	5th	2nd	–	1st	–	8th	4th	8th	–	4th	7th	6th	3rd	2nd	11
Denmark	6th	–	–	–	–	–	–	–	–	–	–	–	–	–	1
Finland	–	–	–	–	–	–	–	–	–	–	–	–	5th	–	1
France	2nd	–	3rd	3rd	3rd	2nd	–	–	–	1st	–	–	–	–	6
Gibraltar	8th	–	–	–	7th	–	–	–	–	–	–	–	–	–	2
Ireland	1st	–	2nd	–	–	–	–	–	1st	–	3rd	1st	–	1st	6
Italy	3rd	–	4th	6th	5th	4th	7th	5th	4th	5th	5th	5th	3rd	2nd	13
Lithuania	–	–	–	–	–	–	–	–	–	–	–	–	5th	6th	2
Luxembourg	–	–	–	–	–	–	–	–	–	–	–	–	6th	–	1
Poland	–	6th	1st	–	–	–	–	2nd	–	2nd	–	4th	2nd	3rd	6
Portugal	7th	–	7th	8th	8th	–	–	–	2nd	–	8th	–	–	–	6
Russia	–	8th	–	2nd	–	1st	–	3rd	5th	6th	2nd	–	–	–	7
Scotland	–	–	–	–	1st	–	1st	–	3rd	3rd	1st	–	2nd	1st	7
Switzerland	–	3rd	–	4th	6th	7th	–	6th	–	–	–	–	1st	–	6
Turkey	–	–	–	–	–	10th	–	–	–	7th	4th	2nd	–	4th	5
Ukraine	–	7th	–	–	–	6th	5th	4th	6th	8th	–	–	4th	5th	7
Wales	4th	5th	6th	5th	4th	5th	2nd	–	–	–	–	3rd	4th	3rd	10
Total	8	8	7	8	8	10	8	8	7	8	8	6	11	10	

== Championship III ==
=== Results ===
Year	Host	Final			Third place match			Number of teams
Year	Host	Winner	Score	Runner-up	Third place	Score	Fourth place	Number of teams
1998; Details	Moscow, Russia	Russia		Switzerland	Ukraine		Belarus	6
2000; Details	Porto, Portugal	Portugal		Croatia	Denmark		Gibraltar	5
2002; Details	Elektrostal, Russia	Russia		Belarus	Ukraine		Azerbaijan	5
2004; Details	Brest, Belarus	Austria		Gibraltar	Ukraine		Azerbaijan	6
2006; Details	Bratislava, Slovakia	Ukraine		Belarus	Azerbaijan		Greece	10
2010; Details	Athens, Greece	Switzerland		Greece	Slovakia		Bulgaria	4
2012; Details	Lisbon, Portugal	Portugal	Round-robin	Turkey	Greece	Round-robin	Gibraltar	6
2012; Details	Bratislava, Slovakia	Ireland	14–0	Slovakia	Lithuania	4–3	Bulgaria	4
2014; Details	Hradec Králové, Czech Republic	Turkey	Round-robin	Czech Republic	Slovakia	Round-robin	Azerbaijan	6
2017	Lucerne, Switzerland	Cancelled			Cancelled			
2019; Details	Vilnius, Lithuania	Wales	4–3	Ukraine	Lithuania	Only three teams		3
2022; Details	Helsinki, Finland	Switzerland	3–2	Ukraine	Lithuania	12–2	Finland	4

=== Summary ===
Team	Winners	Runners-up	Third place	Fourth place
Switzerland	2 (2010, 2022)	1 (1998)		
Portugal	2 (2000*, 2012 A*)			
Russia	2 (1998*, 2002*)			
Ukraine	1 (2006)	2 (2019, 2022)	3 (1998, 2002, 2004)	
Turkey	1 (2014)	1 (2012 A)		
Austria	1 (2004)			
Ireland	1 (2012 B)			
Wales	1 (2019)			
Belarus		2 (2002, 2006)		1 (1998)
Slovakia		1 (2012 B*)	2 (2010, 2014)	
Greece		1 (2010*)	1 (2012 A)	1 (2006)
Gibraltar		1 (2004)		2 (2000, 2012 A)
Croatia		1 (2000)		
Czech Republic		1 (2014*)		
Lithuania			3 (2012 B, 2019*, 2022)	
Azerbaijan			1 (2006)	3 (2002, 2004, 2014)
Denmark			1 (2000)	
Bulgaria				2 (2010, 2012 B)
Finland				1 (2022*)

* = hosts

=== Team appearances ===
Team	(Russia) 1998	(Portugal) 2000	(Russia) 2002	(Belarus) 2004	(Slovakia) 2006	(Greece) 2010	(Portugal) (Slovakia) 2012	(Czech Republic) 2014	(Lithuania) 2019	(Finland) 2022	Total
Austria	–	–	–	1st	–	–	–	–	–	–	1
Azerbaijan	–	–	4th	4th	3rd	–	5th	4th	–	–	5
Belarus	4th	–	2nd	5th	2nd	–	–	–	–	–	4
Bulgaria	5th	–	–	–	5th	4th	4th	–	–	–	4
Croatia	–	2nd	–	–	8th	–	–	–	–	–	2
Cyprus	–	–	–	–	–	–	6th	–	–	–	1
Czech Republic	–	–	–	–	–	–	–	2nd	–	–	1
Denmark	–	3rd	–	–	–	–	–	–	–	–	1
Finland	–	–	–	–	–	–	–	–	–	4th	1
Georgia	6th	–	–	–	–	–	–	–	–	–	1
Gibraltar	–	4th	–	2nd	–	–	4th	5th	–	WD	4
Greece	–	5th	5th	–	4th	2nd	3rd	–	–	–	5
Ireland	–	–	–	–	–	–	1st	–	–	–	1
Lithuania	–	–	–	–	7th	–	3rd	6th	3rd	3rd	5
Portugal	–	1st	–	–	–	–	1st	–	–	WD	2
Romania	–	–	–	–	10th	–	–	–	–	–	1
Russia	1st	–	1st	–	–	–	–	–	–	–	2
Slovakia	–	–	–	–	6th	3rd	2nd	3rd	–	WD	4
Switzerland	2nd	–	–	–	–	1st	–	–	–	1st	3
Turkey	–	–	–	6th	9th	–	2nd	1st	–	–	4
Ukraine	3rd	–	3rd	3rd	1st	–	–	–	2nd	2nd	6
Wales	–	–	–	–	–	–	–	–	1st	–	1
Total	6	5	5	6	10	4	10	6	3	4	

== See also ==
- Boys' EuroHockey U18 Championship
- Men's EuroHockey Championship
- Women's EuroHockey U21 Championship
