= 2017 Men's EuroHockey Junior Championship II =

Tenth edition of the Men's EuroHockey Junior Championship II

Tournament details
- Host country: Russia
- City: Saint Petersburg
- Dates: 16–22 July
- Teams: 8 (from 1 confederation)

Final positions
- Champions: France (1st title)
- Runner-up: Poland
- Third place: Scotland

Tournament statistics
- Matches played: 20
- Goals scored: 110 (5.5 per match)
- Top scorer: (France) Adrien Coffigniez (8 goals)

The 2017 Men's EuroHockey Junior Championship II was the tenth edition of the Men's EuroHockey Junior Championship II, the second level of the men's European under-21 field hockey championships organized by the European Hockey Federation. It was held from 16 to 22 July 2017 in Saint Petersburg, Russia.

France won their first EuroHockey Junior Championship II title and were promoted to the 2019 Men's EuroHockey Junior Championship together with the other finalists Poland.

== Qualified teams ==
The participating teams have qualified based on their final ranking from the 2014 competition.

Dates	Event	Location	Quotas	Qualifier(s)
20–26 July 2014	2014 EuroHockey Junior Championship	Waterloo, Belgium	2	France; Poland
13–19 July 2014	2014 EuroHockey Junior Championship II	Lousada, Portugal	4	Italy; Russia; Scotland; Ukraine
20–26 July 2014	2014 EuroHockey Junior Championship III	Hradec Králové, Czech Republic	2	Czech Republic; Turkey
Total			8	

== Results ==
=== Preliminary round ===
==== Pool A ====
Pos	Team	Pld	W	D	L	GF	GA	GD	Pts	Qualification
1	France	3	3	0	0	15	5	+10	9	Semi-finals
2	Czech Republic	3	1	1	1	8	7	+1	4	Semi-finals
3	Ukraine	3	0	2	1	7	9	−2	2	Relegation pool
4	Turkey	3	0	1	2	6	15	−9	1	Relegation pool

Source: FIH
Rules for classification: 1) points; 2) matches won; 3) goal difference; 4) goals for; 5) head-to-head result; 6) field goals for.

16 July 2017
12:30

Czech Republic	5–1	Turkey
	Report

16 July 2017
19:00

France	4–2	Ukraine
	Report

17 July 2017
15:45

Ukraine	3–3	Turkey
	Report

17 July 2017
18:00

Czech Republic	1–4	France
	Report

19 July 2017
10:15

France	7–2	Turkey
	Report

19 July 2017
12:30

Ukraine	2–2	Czech Republic
	Report

==== Pool B ====
Pos	Team	Pld	W	D	L	GF	GA	GD	Pts	Qualification
1	Poland	3	3	0	0	11	0	+11	9	Semi-finals
2	Scotland	3	2	0	1	9	6	+3	6	Semi-finals
3	Italy	3	1	0	2	4	13	−9	3	Relegation pool
4	Russia (H)	3	0	0	3	4	9	−5	0	Relegation pool

Source: FIH
Rules for classification: 1) points; 2) matches won; 3) goal difference; 4) goals for; 5) head-to-head result; 6) field goals for.
(H) Hosts

16 July 2017
14:45

Poland	3–0	Scotland
	Report

16 July 2017
17:00

Russia	2–3	Italy
	Report

18 July 2017
15:15

Scotland	5–1	Italy
	Report

18 July 2017
17:15

Russia	0–2	Poland
	Report

19 July 2017
14:45

Poland	6–0	Italy
	Report

19 July 2017
17:00

Scotland	4–2	Russia
	Report

=== Fifth to eighth place classification ===
==== Pool C ====
The points obtained in the preliminary round against the other team are taken over.

Pos	Team	Pld	W	D	L	GF	GA	GD	Pts	Relegation
5	Italy	3	2	1	0	9	5	+4	7	
6	Russia (H)	3	2	0	1	16	6	+10	6	
7	Turkey	3	0	2	1	6	12	−6	2	
8	Ukraine	3	0	1	2	6	14	−8	1	EuroHockey Junior Championship III

Source: FIH
Rules for classification: 1) points; 2) matches won; 3) goal difference; 4) goals for; 5) head-to-head result; 6) field goals for.
(H) Hosts

21 July 2017
10:00

Turkey	1–7	Russia
	Report

21 July 2017
12:15

Ukraine	1–4	Italy
	Report

22 July 2017
09:00

Italy	2–2	Turkey
	Report

22 July 2017
11:15

Ukraine	2–7	Russia
	Report

=== First to fourth place classification ===
Semi-finals
21 July
Poland	4
Czech Republic	1
21 July
France	3
Scotland	2

Final
22 July
Poland	0
France	3
Third place
22 July
Czech Republic	3
Scotland	4

==== Semi-finals ====
21 July 2017
14:30

Poland	4–1	Czech Republic
	Report

21 July 2017
17:00

France	3–2	Scotland
	Report

==== Third place game ====
22 July 2017
13:45

Czech Republic	3–4	Scotland
	Report

==== Final ====
22 July 2017
16:15

Poland	0–3	France
	Report

== Statistics ==
=== Final standings ===
Pos	Team	Promotion or relegation
1	France	Promotion to the EuroHockey Junior Championship
2	Poland	Promotion to the EuroHockey Junior Championship
3	Scotland	
4	Czech Republic	
5	Italy	
6	Russia (H)	
7	Turkey	
8	Ukraine	Relegation to the EuroHockey Junior Championship III

Source: FIH
(H) Host

== See also ==
- 2017 Men's EuroHockey Championship II
- 2017 Men's EuroHockey Junior Championship
