= 2014 Men's EuroHockey Junior Championship III =

Tournament details
- Host country: Czech Republic
- City: Hradec Králové
- Dates: 20–26 July
- Teams: 6 (from 1 confederation)

Final positions
- Champions: Turkey (1st title)
- Runner-up: Czech Republic
- Third place: Slovakia

Tournament statistics
- Matches played: 15
- Goals scored: 77 (5.13 per match)
- Top scorer(s): (Turkey) Onur Acikgoz (9 goals)

The 2014 Men's EuroHockey Junior Championship III was the ninth edition of the Men's EuroHockey Junior Championship III, the third level of the men's European under-21 field hockey championships organized by the European Hockey Federation. It was held from 20 to 26 July 2014 in Hradec Králové, Czech Republic.

Turkey won their first EuroHockey Junior Championship III title and were promoted to the 2017 Men's EuroHockey Junior Championship II together with the runners-up and hosts the Czech Republic.

== Results ==
=== Standings ===
Pos	Team	Pld	W	D	L	GF	GA	GD	Pts	Promotion
1	Turkey	5	4	1	0	16	5	+11	13	EuroHockey Junior Championship II
2	Czech Republic (H)	5	4	0	1	17	9	+8	12	EuroHockey Junior Championship II
3	Slovakia	5	2	1	2	12	12	0	7	
4	Azerbaijan	5	2	0	3	11	19	−8	6	
5	Gibraltar	5	1	2	2	15	13	+2	5	
6	Lithuania	5	0	0	5	6	19	−13	0	

Source: FIH
(H) Hosts

=== Matches ===
21 July 2014
14:00

Lithuania	1–2	Slovakia
	Report

21 July 2014
16:00

Gibraltar	2–2	Turkey
	Report

21 July 2014
18:00

Czech Republic	4–1	Azerbaijan
	Report

22 July 2014
14:00

Slovakia	2–2	Gibraltar
	Report

22 July 2014
16:00

Azerbaijan	1–3	Turkey
	Report

22 July 2014
18:00

Czech Republic	4–1	Lithuania
	Report

23 July 2014
14:00

Turkey	2–1	Slovakia
	Report

23 July 2014
16:00

Lithuania	2–3	Azerbaijan
	Report

23 July 2014
18:00

Czech Republic	4–3	Gibraltar
	Report

25 July 2014
14:00

Slovakia	7–2	Azerbaijan
	Report

25 July 2014
16:00

Lithuania	1–5	Gibraltar
	Report

25 July 2014
18:00

Czech Republic	0–4	Turkey
	Report

26 July 2014
10:00

Gibraltar	3–4	Azerbaijan
	Report

26 July 2014
12:00

Turkey	5–1	Lithuania
	Report

26 July 2014
14:00

Czech Republic	5–0	Slovakia
	Report

== See also ==
- 2014 Men's EuroHockey Junior Championship II
