= Catalan time system =

Traditional manner of telling time in Catalan

The Catalan time system is the traditional manner in which to tell time in Catalan. Telling the time through this system works by dividing it in fractions of a quarter and half a quarter of an hour. Hour-fractions refer to the starting hour, taking into account that when a clock reaches a whole hour (e.g. three o'clock) it actually indicates its end.

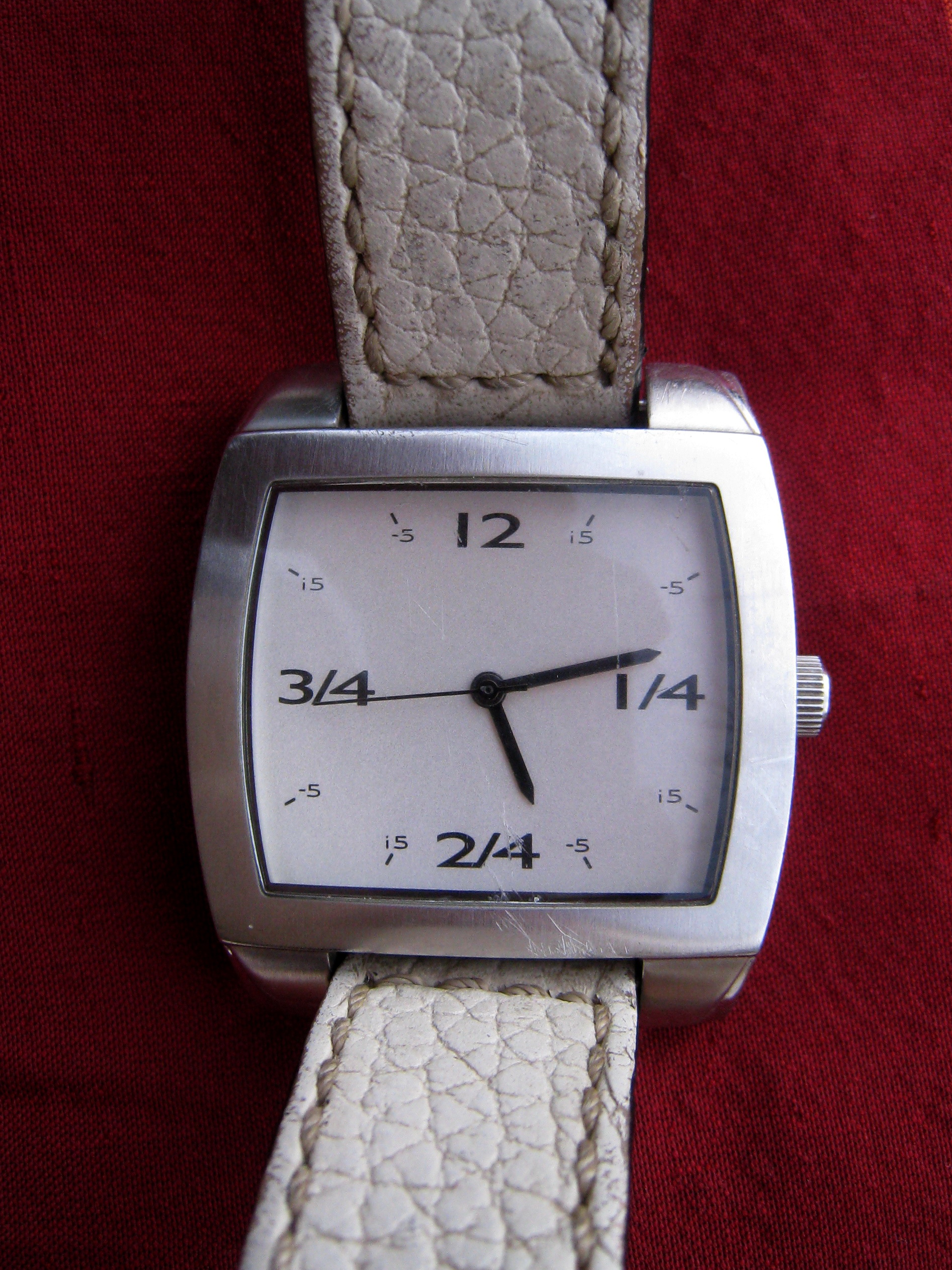
Catalan-system watch telling the time

The order is quarts-minuts-hora posterior (quarters-minutes-next hour). Hence, for example, 10:15 h would be un quart d'onze ("a quarter of eleven"); 12:30 h, dos quarts d'una ("two quarters of one"), and 19:52 h would be tres quarts i set minuts de vuit ("three quarters and seven minutes of eight"). Additionally, there are little variations by which the expression dos quarts ("two quarters") is shortened to just quarts ("quarters"); also, mig quart ("half a quarter") is used as an approximation in place of the too specific set minuts i mig ("seven minutes and a half").

== Notation examples ==
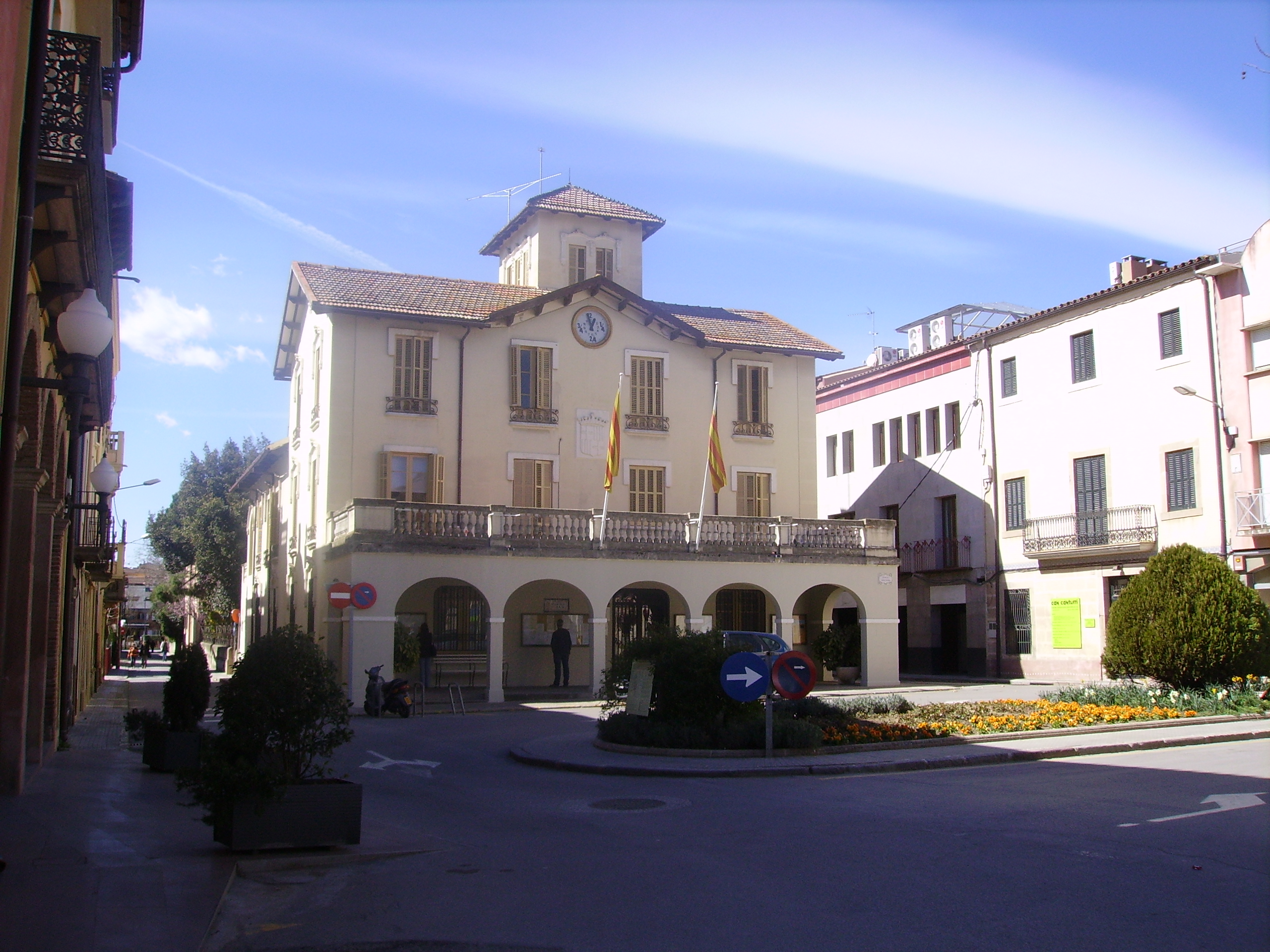
Cardedeu's town council has a Catalan-system clock on its façade, telling the time in quarters.

- "Quarters" (quarts) examples:

01:15 un quart de dues ("a quarter of two")
01:30 dos quarts de dues ("two quarters of two")
01:45 tres quarts de dues ("three quarters of two")

- Whenever it's clear that you are referring specifically to the time (for example, when someone's asking it), you can give the time by leaving out the quarts ("quarters"), thus shortening the notation as follows:

07:45 tres de vuit ("three [quarters] of eight")
16:30 dos de cinc ("two [quarters] of five")

- "Half a quarter" (mig quart) examples:

02:07:30 mig quart de tres (half a quarter of three)
02:22:30 un quart i mig de tres (a quarter and a half of three)
02:37:30 dos quarts i mig de tres (two quarters and a half of three)
02:52:30 tres quarts i mig de tres (three quarters and a half of three)

The Catalan time system is restricted to 12-hour clocks; if necessary, one can specify if it's an hour of the morning (matinada or matí), noon (migdia), afternoon (tarda or vesprada), evening (vespre) or night (nit).
