= 2019 Men's EuroHockey Junior Championship III =

Tournament details
- Host country: Lithuania
- City: Vilnius
- Dates: 18–21 July
- Teams: 3 (from 1 confederation)
- Venue: Zemyna Gymnasium stadium

Final positions
- Champions: Wales
- Runner-up: Ukraine
- Third place: Lithuania

Tournament statistics
- Matches played: 4
- Goals scored: 28 (7 per match)
- Top scorer: (Wales) Ioan Wall (5 goals)

The 2019 Men's EuroHockey Junior Championship III was the tenth edition of the Men's EuroHockey Junior Championship III, the third level of the men's European under-21 field hockey championships organized by the European Hockey Federation. It was held from 18 to 21 July 2019 in Vilnius, Lithuania.

Wales won their first EuroHockey Junior Championship III title and were promoted to the 2022 Men's EuroHockey Junior Championship II.

== Results ==
=== Preliminary round ===
Pos	Team	Pld	W	D	L	GF	GA	GD	Pts	Qualification
1	Wales	2	2	0	0	11	3	+8	6	Final
2	Ukraine	2	1	0	1	9	5	+4	3	Final
3	Lithuania (H)	2	0	0	2	1	13	−12	0	

Source: FIH
Rules for classification: 1) points; 2) matches won; 3) goal difference; 4) goals for; 5) head-to-head result; 6) field goals for.
(H) Hosts

18 July 2019
18:00

Wales	6–1	Lithuania
I. Wall 29'; Newbold 30'; Bradshaw 32'; B. Wall 45'; Draper 51'; Riley 58'	Report	Lakstauskas 45'

Umpires:
Jasper Nagtzaam (NED)
Rob Abbott (IRL)

19 July 2019
17:00

Ukraine	2–5	Wales
Bielozerov 22'; Hyrenko 60'	Report	Bradshaw 13'; Wheeler 18'; I. Wall 21', 56'; Margetson 37'

Umpires:
Jasper Nagtzaam (NED)
Jaroslav Suchocki (LTU)

20 July 2019
15:00

Lithuania	0–7	Ukraine
	Report	Bielozerov 6', 46', 48'; Popov 8'; Hyrenko 14', 53'; Rudnitskyi 22'

Umpires:
Rob Abbott (IRL)
Kevin Roberts (WAL)

=== Final ===
21 July 2019
12:00

Wales	4–3	Ukraine
I. Wall 13', 13'; Bradshaw 54', 60'	Report	Solomianyi 24', 40'; Dzemukh 50'

Umpires:
Jasper Nagtzaam (NED)
Rob Abbott (IRL)

== Statistics ==
=== Final standings ===
Pos	Team	Promotion
1	Wales	EuroHockey Junior Championship II
2	Ukraine	
3	Lithuania (H)	

Source: FIH
(H) Host

== Goalscorers ==
There were 28 goals scored in 4 matches, for an average of 7 goals per match.

5 goals

- (Wales) Ioan Wall

4 goals

- (Ukraine) Oleksii Bielozerov
- (Wales) Rhys Bradshaw

3 goals

- (Ukraine) Roman Hyrenko

2 goals

- (Ukraine) Oleksandr Solomianyi

1 goal

- (Lithuania) Povilas Lakstauskas
- (Ukraine) Yurii Dzemukh
- (Ukraine) Oleksii Popov
- (Ukraine) Vadym Rudnitskyi
- (Wales) Jacob Draper
- (Wales) Miles Margetson
- (Wales) Fred Newbold
- (Wales) William Riley
- (Wales) Benjamin Wall
- (Wales) Oliver Wheeler

Source: FIH

== See also ==
- 2019 Men's EuroHockey Championship III
- 2019 Men's EuroHockey Junior Championship II
