= Switzerland men's national under-21 field hockey team =

Switzerland
- Association: Swiss Hockey Federation
- Confederation: EHF (Europe)
- Head Coach: Jaïr Levie
- Assistant coach(es): Nastasjia Erasmus; Thierry Grandchamp

FIH Hockey Junior World Cup
- Appearances: 1 (first in 2025)
- Best result: 16th (2025)

EuroHockey U21 Championship
- Appearances: 3 (first in 1992)
- Best result: 7th (1992)

The Switzerland men's national under-21 field hockey team represents Switzerland in men's international under-21 field hockey competitions and is controlled by the Swiss Hockey Association, the governing body for field hockey in Switzerland.

The team competes in the EuroHockey Junior Championships and have qualified for the Men's FIH hockey Junior World Cup jointly hosted by Madurai and Chennai in Tamil Nadu, India and made their debut in the Junior World Cup against Oman at the Mayor Radhakrishnan Hockey Stadium in Chennai.

== Tournament record ==
=== FIH Hockey Junior World Cup ===
Junior World Cup record
Year	Host	Position	Pld	W	D	L	GF	GA	Squad
1979 to 2023		did not qualify							
2025	Tamil Nadu, India	16th	6	2	0	5	13	21	Squad
2027	TBD								
Total		16th place	6	2	0	5	13	21	

=== EuroHockey U21 Championship ===
EuroHockey U21 Championship record
Year	Host	Position
1992	Vught, Netherlands	7th
2002	Lausanne, Switzerland	8th
2026	Valencia, Spain	8th
Best result		7th

=== EuroHockey U21 Championship II ===
EuroHockey U21 Championship II record
Year	Host	Position
2000	Vienna, Austria	3rd
2002	Lousada, Portugal	4th
2006	Gibraltar	6th
2009	Bra, Italy	7th
2012	Cernusco sul Naviglio, Italy	6th
2024 B	Lausanne, Switzerland	1st
Best result		1st

== Current squad ==
Head coach: Jaïr Levie

1. Clemént Thijs
2. Maurizio Ribaudo
3. Louis Thijs
4. Léonard Kraxner
5. Jens Flück (C)
6. Frederik von Strantz
7. Jonathan Baumbach
8. Ben Gasser
9. Yannick Hug (C)
10. Lionel Krneta (GK)
11. Pascal Gremlich
12. Fritz Eickhoff
13. Alessio Brunold
14. Timo Graf (GK)
15. Victor Herzog
16. Mattia Ribaudo
17. Jonathan Kleschin
18. Max Fischbach
19. Corsin Rauch
20. Cedrix Eichenberger

== See also ==
- Switzerland men's national field hockey team
