= Josef Toms =

Czech basketball player

Personal information
- Nationality: Czech
- Born: 26 January 1922
- Died: 6 April 2016 (aged 94)

Sport
- Sport: Basketball

Josef Toms (26 January 1922 – 6 April 2016) was a Czech basketball player. He competed in the men's tournament at the 1948 Summer Olympics.
