= 2011 Girls' EuroHockey Youth Championships =

Tournament details
- Host country: Netherlands
- City: Utrecht
- Dates: 12–17 July
- Teams: 8 (from 1 confederation)
- Venue: De Klapperboom

Final positions
- Champions: Netherlands (4th title)
- Runner-up: Germany
- Third place: England

Tournament statistics
- Matches played: 20
- Goals scored: 92 (4.6 per match)
- Top scorer: (Germany) Laura Saenger (9 goals)
- Best player: (Netherlands) Lisa Scheerlinck

The 2011 Girls' EuroHockey Youth Championship was the 6th edition of the Girls' EuroHockey Youth Championships, the biennial international women's under-18 field hockey championship of Europe organized by the European Hockey Federation. The tournament was held from 12 to 17 July 2011 in Utrecht, Netherlands at the De Klapperboom.

Netherlands won the tournament for the fourth time after defeating Germany 4–1 in the final.

== Format ==
The eight teams were split into two groups of four teams. The top two teams advanced to the semifinals to determine the winner in a knockout system. The bottom two teams played in a new group with the teams they did not play against in the group stage. The bottom two teams were relegated to the EuroHockey Youth Championship II.

== Qualified teams ==
The following teams participated in the 2011 EuroHockey Youth Championship:

Dates	Event	Location	Quotas	Qualifier(s)
–	Host		1	Netherlands
7–12 July 2011	2009 EuroHockey Youth Championship	Nivelles, Belgium	5	Belgium; England; France; Germany; Ireland
7–12 July 2011	2009 EuroHockey Youth Championship II	Madrid, Spain	2	Scotland; Spain
Total			8	

== Officials ==
The following umpires were appointed by the EHF and FIH to officiate the tournament:

- Ana Faias (POR)
- Ines El Hajem (FRA)
- Heike Holthausen (GER)
- Alison Keogh (IRE)
- Adrienne Lijs (NED)
- Hanneke Menting (NED)
- Sylvie Petitjean (FRA)
- Brigitta Sedy (AUT)
- Montserrat Solózano (ESP)
- Alwine Sterk (NED)
- Kerri Target (SCO)
- Lia Waine (ENG)
- Nicole Wajer (NED)
- Nicole de Winter (NED)

== Preliminary round ==
=== Pool A ===
Pos	Team	Pld	W	D	L	GF	GA	GD	Pts	Qualification
1	Netherlands (H)	3	3	0	0	26	1	+25	9	Semi-finals
2	Ireland	3	2	0	1	4	5	−1	6	Semi-finals
3	Belgium	3	1	0	2	3	12	−9	3	
4	Scotland	3	0	0	3	2	17	−15	0	

Source: Deutscher Hockey-Bund
Rules for classification: 1) points; 2) goal difference; 3) goals scored; 4) head-to-head result.
(H) Hosts

12 July 2011
15:05

Netherlands	4–0	Ireland
Scheerlinck 8'; L. van Wijk 28', 34'; Nix 57'	Report

Umpires:
Ana Faias (POR)
Montserrat Solózano (ESP)

12 July 2011
17:00

Belgium	3–0	Scotland
Gerniers 42', 64'; Wouters 45'	Report

Umpires:
Lia Waine (ENG)
Brigitta Sedy (AUT)

13 July 2011
15:00

Ireland	3–1	Scotland
Froeling 2', 20'; Beattie 65'	Report	Robertson 27'

Umpires:
Nicole de Winter (NED)
Sylvie Petitjean (FRA)

13 July 2011
17:05

Belgium	0–11	Netherlands
	Report	Plokker 8'; Nix 12', 60'; Scheerlinck 14'; L. van Wijk 23', 29', 38'; Keil 25'; De Lange 45', 48'; Derkx 65'

Umpires:
Heike Holthausen (GER)
Ines El Hajem (FRA)

15 July 2011
15:05

Netherlands	11–1	Scotland
Derkx 3', 24'; Scheerlinck 7', 14', 18', 61'; Keil 23'; Verschoor 26', 43'; Nix 58', 59'	Report	Hill 42'

Umpires:
Ines El Hajem (FRA)
Brigitta Sedy (AUT)

15 July 2011
17:00

Ireland	1–0	Belgium
Mullan 1'	Report

Umpires:
Lia Waine (ENG)
Adrienne Lijs (NED)

=== Pool B ===
Pos	Team	Pld	W	D	L	GF	GA	GD	Pts	Qualification
1	Germany	3	3	0	0	13	2	+11	9	Semi-finals
2	England	3	2	0	1	6	4	+2	6	Semi-finals
3	France	3	1	0	2	3	10	−7	3	
4	Spain	3	0	0	3	4	10	−6	0	

Source: Deutscher Hockey-Bund
Rules for classification: 1) points; 2) goal difference; 3) goals scored; 4) head-to-head result.

12 July 2011
11:05

Germany	6–0	France
Saenger 16', 34', 48', 61'; Knüpfer 41'; Willems 57'	Report

Umpires:
Kerri Target (SCO)
Alwine Sterk (NED)

12 July 2011
13:00

England	3–1	Spain
Crosley 11', 44'; Curran 55'	Report	Pons 40'

Umpires:
Alison Keogh (IRE)
Nicole Wajer (NED)

13 July 2011
11:00

England	1–3	Germany
Curran 48'	Report	Saenger 4', 40'; Stöckel 62'

Umpires:
Adrienne Lijs (NED)
Kerri Target (SCO)

13 July 2011
13:05

France	3–2	Spain
Billore 24', 51'; Huvelle 33'	Report	Heras 7'; Tost 19'

Umpires:
Hanneke Menting (NED)
Nicole Wajer (NED)

14 July 2011
11:05

Germany	4–1	Spain
Saenger 6'; Stöckel 25'; Krätsch 30'; Hayn 34'	Report	Magaz 58'

Umpires:
Alwine Sterk (NED)
Ana Faias (POR)

15 July 2011
13:00

France	0–2	England
	Report	Cox 52'; Crosley 54'

Umpires:
Montserrat Solózano (ESP)
Alison Keogh (IRE)

== Fifth to eighth place classification ==
Points from the preliminary round were carried over to Pool C to determine group standings.

=== Pool C ===
Pos	Team	Pld	W	D	L	GF	GA	GD	Pts	Relegation
1	France	3	3	0	0	7	4	+3	9	
2	Belgium	3	2	0	1	7	4	+3	6	
3	Scotland (R)	3	1	0	2	3	6	−3	3	EuroHockey Youth Championship II
4	Spain (R)	3	0	0	3	5	8	−3	0	EuroHockey Youth Championship II

Source: Deutscher Hockey-Bund
Rules for classification: 1) points; 2) goal difference; 3) goals scored; 4) head-to-head result.
(R) Relegated

16 July 2011
09:00

Scotland	2–1	Spain
Lang 28'; Hill 42'	Report	Ca. Salvatella 8'

Umpires:
Kerri Targett (SCO)
Ines El Hajem (FRA)

16 July 2011
09:05

Belgium	1–2	France
Beernaert 37'	Report	Billore 11', 59'

Umpires:
Heike Holthausen (GER)
Nicole Wajer (NED)

17 July 2011
08:00

France	2–1	Scotland
Preney 15'; Billore 33'	Report	Robertson 22'

Umpires:
Hanneke Menting (NED)
Montserrat Solózano (ESP)

17 July 2011
08:05

Belgium	3–2	Spain
Vandermeiren 7'; Fobe 32'; Gerniers 37'	Report	Ca. Salvatella 55'; Tost 64'

Umpires:
Lia Waine (ENG)
Sylvie Petitjean (FRA)

== First to fourth place classification ==
=== Bracket ===
Semi-finals
16 July
Netherlands	2
England	0
16 July
Germany	4
Ireland	1

Final
17 July
Netherlands	4
Germany	1
Third place
17 July
England	4
Ireland	1

=== Semi-finals ===
16 July 2011
13:05

Germany	4–1	Ireland
Saenger 3', 27'; Knüpfer 30'; Mayen 38'	Report	Mullan 13'

Umpires:
Lia Waine (ENG)
Ana Faias (POR)

16 July 2011
15:30

Netherlands	2–0	England
L. van Wijk 14'; Verschoor 55'	Report

Umpires:
Alison Keogh (IRE)
Montserrat Solózano (ESP)

=== Third and fourth place ===
17 July 2011
12:15

England	4–1	Ireland
Owsley 34'; Martin 39', 45'; Crosley 58'	Report	McKee 57'

Umpires:
Nicole de Winter (NED)
Kerri Targett (SCO)

=== Final ===
17 July 2011
12:45

Netherlands	4–1	Germany
De Lange 9'; Verschoor 32'; Plokker 43'; Scheerlinck 68'	Report	Stöckel 15'

Umpires:
Alison Keogh (IRE)
Ana Faias (POR)

== Statistics ==
=== Final standings ===
Pos	Team	Relegation
1st place, gold medalist(s)	Netherlands (H, C)	
2nd place, silver medalist(s)	Germany	
3rd place, bronze medalist(s)	England	
4	Ireland	
5	France	
6	Belgium	
7	Scotland (R)	EuroHockey Youth Championship II
8	Spain (R)	EuroHockey Youth Championship II

Source: Deutscher Hockey-Bund
(C) Champion; (H) Host; (R) Relegated

=== Awards ===
The following awards were presented at the conclusion of the tournament:

Player of the Tournament	Top Goalscorer	Goalkeeper of the Tournament
(Netherlands) Lisa Scheerlinck	(Germany) Laura Saenger	(France) Isabelle Gerz

=== Goalscorers ===
There were 92 goals scored in 20 matches, for an average of 4.6 goals per match.

9 goals

- (Germany) Laura Saenger

7 goals

- (Netherlands) Lisa Scheerlinck

6 goals

- (Netherlands) Lieke van Wijk

5 goals

- (France) Marie Billore
- (Netherlands) Elsie Nix

4 goals

- (England) Sophie Crosley
- (Netherlands) Maria Verschoor

3 goals

- (Belgium) Alix Gerniers
- (Germany) Lea Stöckel
- (Netherlands) Frederique Derkx
- (Netherlands) Lisanne de Lange

2 goals

- (England) Faye Curran
- (England) Hannah Martin
- (Germany) Sabine Knüpfer
- (Ireland) Kate Froeling
- (Ireland) Kathryn Mullan
- (Netherlands) Sian Keil
- (Netherlands) Floortje Plokker
- (Scotland) Kirsty Hill
- (Scotland) Sarah Robertson
- (Spain) Carola Salvatella
- (Spain) María Tost

1 goal

- (Belgium) Maureen Beernaert
- (Belgium) Aliné Fobe
- (Belgium) Judith Vandermeiren
- (Belgium) Axelle Wouters
- (England) Charlotte Cox
- (England) Lily Owsley
- (France) Morgane Huvelle
- (France) Marie Preney
- (Germany) Mieketine Hayn
- (Germany) Nathalie Krätsch
- (Germany) Sophie Mayen
- (Germany) Louisa Willems
- (Ireland) Emily Beattie
- (Ireland) Lucy McKee
- (Scotland) Heather Lang
- (Spain) Mariona Heras
- (Spain) Alicia Magaz
- (Spain) Júlia Pons
