= 2025 Girls' EuroHockey U18 Championship =

Field hockey championship edition

Tournament details
- Host country: France
- City: Lille
- Dates: 13–19 July
- Teams: 8 (from 1 confederation)
- Venue: Lille MHC

Final positions
- Champions: Netherlands (9th title)
- Runner-up: Belgium
- Third place: Spain

Tournament statistics
- Matches played: 12
- Goals scored: 74 (6.17 per match)
- Top scorer: (Belgium) Emilie Verhees (7 goals)

The 2025 Girls' EuroHockey U18 Championship was the 13th edition of the Girls' EuroHockey U18 Championship, the biennial international women's under-18 field hockey championship of Europe organized by the European Hockey Federation.

The tournament was held alongside the boys' tournament at Lille MHC in Lille, France from 13 to 19 July 2025. Germany were the defending champions.

== Qualification ==
Participating nations qualified based on their final ranking from the 2023 competition.

Dates	Event	Location	Quotas	Qualifier(s)
8–16 July 2023	2023 EuroHockey U18 Championship	Krefeld, Germany	6	Belgium; England; France; Germany; Netherlands; Spain
9–14 July 2023	2023 EuroHockey U18 Championship II	Swansea, Wales	1	Poland
10–15 July 2023	2023 EuroHockey U18 Championship II	Zagreb, Croatia	1	Italy
Total			8	

== Preliminary round ==
=== Pool A ===
Pos	Team	Pld	W	D	L	GF	GA	GD	Pts	Qualification
1	Netherlands	3	2	1	0	13	1	+12	7	Semi-finals
2	Germany	3	2	1	0	12	1	+11	7	Semi-finals
3	England	3	1	0	2	12	8	+4	3	
4	Italy	3	0	0	3	0	27	−27	0	

Source: EHF
Rules for classification: 1) points; 2) matches won; 3) goal difference; 4) goals for; 5) head-to-head result; 6) field goals for.

13 July 2025
11:00

England	12–0	Italy
Carter 14'; Mills 14', 22', 26', 35', 40', 60'; Barrett 28'; Baggett 36'; Gardens 41'; Grindal 55'; Younger 59'	Report

Pitch 2
Umpires:
Arlette Bloks (NED)
Tim Hart (SCO)

13 July 2025
11:20

Germany	1–1	Netherlands
Pabsch 39'	Report	Alkemade 15'

Pitch 1
Umpires:
Charly Cordeau (FRA)
Noemi Di Bella (ITA)

15 July 2025
10:15

Netherlands	8–0	Italy
Akkerman 3', 24'; Huisman 8'; De Leeuw 18'; Boere 29', 52'; Ruts 31', 42'	Report

Pitch 1
Umpires:
Enzo Saleine (FRA)
Paula Slawinska (POL)

15 July 2025
12:30

England	0–4	Germany
	Report	Dreyer 5'; Pabsch 49'; Zich 53'; Knörndel 57'

Pitch 1
Umpires:
Miriam Gerö (AUT)
Thalia Bellemans (BEL)

16 July 2025
12:30

Germany	7–0	Italy
Käske 15+'; Pabsch 35', 53'; Kunze 44', 56'; Buddenberg 45'; Zich 57'	Report

Pitch 2
Umpires:
Sam Church (ENG)
Tobiáš Chládek (CZE)

16 July 2025
12:50

Netherlands	4–0	England
Akkerman 1', 59'; Visser 32'; Ruts 44'	Report

Pitch 1
Umpires:
Benjamin Messerli (SUI)
Charly Cordeau (FRA)

=== Pool B ===
Pos	Team	Pld	W	D	L	GF	GA	GD	Pts	Qualification
1	Belgium	3	3	0	0	20	1	+19	9	Semi-finals
2	Spain	3	2	0	1	15	3	+12	6	Semi-finals
3	Poland	3	1	0	2	1	17	−16	3	
4	France (H)	3	0	0	3	1	16	−15	0	

Source: EHF
Rules for classification: 1) points; 2) matches won; 3) goal difference; 4) goals for; 5) head-to-head result; 6) field goals for.
(H) Hosts

13 July 2025
13:15

Spain	7–0	Poland
De La Llama 11'; Hofmeister 13'; Aurell 17', 32', 50'; Vidal 34'; Borràs 38'	Report

Pitch 2
Umpires:
Tanya Sargeant (ENG)
Louis De Clerq (BEL)

13 July 2025
13:35

Belgium	7–1	France
Verhees 2', 47'; Van Heel 29'; Favart 32', 34'; Van Herendael 44'; Van Remortel 51'	Report	Gaillard 57'

Pitch 1
Umpires:
Maya Antia-Frese (GER)
Paula Slawinska (POL)

14 July 2025
11:15

Spain	0–3	Belgium
	Report	Verhees 20'; Van Herendael 33', 34'

Pitch 1
Umpires:
Thomas Hinsken (GER)
Noemi Di Bella (ITA)

14 July 2025
15:45

France	0–1	Poland
	Report	Arciszewska 60'

Pitch 1
Umpires:
Tobiáš Chládek (CZE)
Emilia Lozano (ESP)

16 July 2025
19:15

Belgium	10–0	Poland
Van Remortel 5'; Van Heel 7', 15'; Van Herendael 22'; Favart 41'; Verhees 48', 51', 58', 58'; Herzeele 49'	Report

Pitch 2
Umpires:
Tim Hart (SCO)
Xabier Lopez (ESP)

16 July 2025
19:35

France	0–8	Spain
	Report	Mallagaray 7'; Escudero 12', 28'; Aurell 13', 51'; Marquès 21', 54'; Borràs 34'

Pitch 1
Umpires:
Paula Slawinska (POL)
Arlette Bloks (NED)

== Fifth to eighth place classification ==
The points obtained in the preliminary round against the other team were carried over.

=== Pool C ===
Pos	Team	Pld	W	D	L	GF	GA	GD	Pts	Relegation
1	England	3	3	0	0	25	0	+25	9	
2	Poland	3	2	0	1	7	9	−2	6	
3	France (H)	3	1	0	2	2	6	−4	3	EuroHockey U18 Championship II
4	Italy	3	0	0	3	1	20	−19	0	EuroHockey U18 Championship II

Updated to match(es) played on 16 July 2025. Source: EHF
Rules for classification: 1) points; 2) matches won; 3) goal difference; 4) goals for; 5) head-to-head result; 6) field goals for.
(H) Hosts

18 July 2025
14:30

Italy	1–2	France
Pericoli 31'	Report	Mekki 17'; Watine 24'

Pitch 2
Umpires:
Tim Hart (SCO)
Tanya Sargeant (ENG)

18 July 2025
16:45

England	9–0	Poland
Kaur 19'; Barrett 22', 55', 55', 55'; Younger 26'; Baggett 32', 47'; Key 52'	Report

Pitch 2
Umpires:
Charly Cordeau (FRA)
Mriam Gerö (AUT)

19 July 2025
12:35

Poland	6–0	Italy
Gorski 16', 48', 58'; Tujdowska 28'; Heuvel 51'; Wochna 56'	Report

Pitch 2
Umpires:
Tobiáš Chládek (CZE)
Tanya Sargeant (ENG)

19 July 2025
14:50

England	4–0	France
Mills 45', 53', 59'; Barrett 49'	Report

Pitch 2
Umpires:
Paula Slawinska (POL)
Maya Antia-Frese (GER)

== First to fourth place classification ==
=== Bracket ===
Semi-finals
18 July
Netherlands	2
Spain	0
18 July
Belgium	3
Germany	1

Final
19 July
Netherlands	3
Belgium	2
Third place
19 July
Spain	3
Germany	1

=== Semi-finals ===
18 July 2025
14:50

Netherlands	2–0	Spain
Huisman 42'; Visser 59'	Report

Pitch 1
Umpires:
Maya Antia-Frese (GER)
Thalia Bellemans (BEL)

18 July 2025
17:05

Belgium	3–1	Germany
Boey 2'; Van Heel 22', 33'	Report	Green 41'

Pitch 1
Umpires:
Emilia Lozano (ESP)
Marc van Tuijl (NED)

=== Third and fourth place ===
19 July 2025
14:30

Spain	3–1	Germany
Grisolìa 3'; Escudero 29'; Holfmeister 33'	Report	Buddenberg 15'

Pitch 1
Umpires:
Noemi Di Bella (ITA)
Thalia Bellemans (BEL)

=== Final ===
19 July 2025
19:00

Netherlands	3–2	Belgium
Boere 28', 44'; Huisman 46'	Report	Van den Abeele 53', 55'

Pitch 1
Umpires:
Miriam Gerö (AUT)
Emilia Lozano (ESP)

== Statistics ==
=== Goalscorers ===
There were 74 goals scored in 12 matches, for an average of 6.17 goals per match (as of 16 July 2025).

7 goals

- (Belgium) Emlie Verhees

6 goals

- (England) Biba Mills

5 goals

- (Spain) Paula Aurell

4 goals

- (Belgium) Louise Van Herendael
- (Germany) Franzsika Pabsch
- (Netherlands) Yara Akkerman

3 goals

- (Belgium) Agathe Favart
- (Belgium) Famke Van Heel
- (Netherlands) Lotte Ruts

2 goals

- (Belgium) Alexi Van Remortel
- (Germany) Rosa Kunze
- (Germany) Lucy Zich
- (Netherlands) Isabel Boere
- (Spain) Anna Borràs
- (Spain) Claudia Escudero
- (Spain) Anna Marquès

1 goal

- (Belgium) Emma Herzeele
- (England) Elena Baggett
- (England) Emily Barrett
- (England) Amelie Carter
- (England) Beth Gardens
- (England) Evie Grindal
- (England) Evie Younger
- (France) Zoé Gaillard
- (Germany) Marie Buddenberg
- (Germany) Janne Dreyer
- (Germany) Emma Knörndel
- (Germany) Victoria Käske
- (Netherlands) Roos Alkemade
- (Netherlands) Olivia Huisman
- (Netherlands) Imme de Leeuw
- (Netherlands) Ellemeike Visser
- (Poland) Jagoda Arciszewska
- (Spain) Alejandra De La Llama
- (Spain) Raquel Hofmeister
- (Spain) Victoria Mallagaray
- (Spain) Maria Vidal

Source: EHF

== See also ==
- 2025 Boys' EuroHockey U18 Championship
