= Girls' EuroHockey U18 Championship =

- Most recent season or competition: 2025 Girls' EuroHockey U18 Championship
- Formerly: Girls' EuroHockey Youth Championship
- Sport: Field hockey
- Founded: 2002; 24 years ago
- No. of teams: 8
- Confederation: EHF (Europe)
- Most recent champion: Netherlands (9th title) (2025)
- Most titles: Netherlands (9 titles)
- Level on pyramid: 1
- Relegation to: EuroHockey U18 Championship II

The Girls' EuroHockey U18 Championship is a biennial European field hockey competition for girls' under-18 national teams organized by the European Hockey Federation.

The Championship sees the eight highest-ranked teams contesting the title. The competition take place every two years in the odd-numbered years. Teams ranked 9th to 16th will compete in Championship II, the next level competes in Championship III.

Germany and the Netherlands are the only two countries to have won the title.

== Results ==
Year	Host	Final			Third place match			Number of teams
Year	Host	Winner	Score	Runner-up	Third place	Score	Fourth place	Number of teams
2002	Rotterdam, Netherlands	Germany		Netherlands	Spain		England	8
2003	Dublin, Ireland	Netherlands		Germany	England		Spain	8
2005	Siemianowice Śląskie, Poland	Netherlands		Germany	Spain		Ireland	8
2007	Edinburgh, Scotland	Germany		Netherlands	Belgium		England	8
2009	Nivelles, Belgium	Netherlands		Germany	England		Belgium	8
2011; Details	Utrecht, Netherlands	Netherlands	4–1	Germany	England	4–1	Ireland	8
2013; Details	Dublin, Ireland	Netherlands	1–0	Germany	England	1–1 (3–1 s.o.)	France	8
2015; Details	Santander, Spain	Netherlands	6–1	Germany	England	2–0	Belgium	8
2016; Details	Cork, Ireland	Netherlands	2–0	Germany	England	1–1 (3–2 s.o.)	Belgium	8
2018; Details	Santander, Spain	Netherlands	5–0	Belgium	England	2–1	Germany	8
2020; Details	Kazan, Russia	Cancelled due to the COVID-19 pandemic.			Cancelled.			8
2021; Details	Valencia, Spain	Germany	Round-robin tournament	Spain	Netherlands	Round-robin tournament	Belgium	5
2023; Details	Krefeld, Germany	Germany	0–0 (3–2 s.o.)	Belgium	Spain	1–0	England	9
2025; Details	Lille, France	Netherlands	3–2	Belgium	Spain	3–1	Germany	8
2027; Details	Wavre, Belgium							8

=== Summary ===
Team	Winners	Runners-up	Third place	Fourth place
Netherlands	9 (2003, 2005, 2009, 2011*, 2013, 2015, 2016, 2018, 2025)	2 (2002*, 2007)	1 (2021)	
Germany	4 (2002, 2007, 2021, 2023*)	7 (2003, 2005, 2009, 2011, 2013, 2015, 2016)		2 (2018, 2025)
Belgium		3 (2018, 2023, 2025)	1 (2007)	4 (2009*, 2015, 2016, 2021)
Spain		1 (2021*)	4 (2002, 2005, 2023, 2025)	1 (2003)
England			7 (2003, 2009, 2011, 2013, 2015, 2016, 2018)	3 (2002, 2007, 2023)
Ireland				2 (2005, 2011)
France				1 (2013)

* = hosts

=== Team appearances ===
Team	(Netherlands) 2002	(Republic of Ireland) 2003	(Poland) 2005	(Scotland) 2007	(Belgium) 2009	(Netherlands) 2011	(Republic of Ireland) 2013	(Spain) 2015	(Republic of Ireland) 2016	(Spain) 2018	(Spain) 2021	(Germany) 2023	(France) 2025	(Belgium) 2027	Total
Austria	–	–	–	–	–	–	–	–	–	–	–	9th	–	–	1
Belarus	–	–	–	–	–	–	–	–	–	7th	–	–	–	–	1
Belgium	7th	–	5th	3rd	4th	6th	5th	4th	4th	2nd	4th	2nd	2nd	Q	13
England	4th	3rd	6th	4th	3rd	3rd	3rd	3rd	3rd	3rd	–	4th	5th	Q	13
France	5th	8th	–	7th	6th	5th	4th	7th	–	8th	–	6th	7th	–	10
Germany	1st	2nd	2nd	1st	2nd	2nd	2nd	2nd	2nd	4th	1st	1st	4th	Q	14
Ireland	6th	6th	4th	8th	5th	4th	7th	–	6th	6th	–	8th	–	Q	11
Italy	–	–	–	–	–	–	–	–	–	–	–	–	8th	–	1
Lithuania	–	–	–	–	8th	–	–	–	–	–	–	–	–	–	1
Netherlands	2nd	1st	1st	2nd	1st	1st	1st	1st	1st	1st	3rd	5th	1st	Q	14
Poland	8th	–	8th	–	–	–	–	–	8th	–	–	–	6th	Q	5
Russia	–	–	–	6th	7th	–	6th	6th	7th	–	5th	–	–	–	6
Scotland	–	7th	–	5th	–	7th	–	8th	–	–	–	7th	–	Q	6
Spain	3rd	4th	3rd	–	–	8th	–	5th	5th	5th	2nd	3rd	3rd	Q	11
Ukraine	–	5th	7th	–	–	–	–	–	–	–	–	–	–	–	2
Wales	–	–	–	–	–	–	8th	–	–	–	–	–	–	–	1
Total	8	8	8	8	8	8	8	8	8	8	5	9	8	8	

== See also ==
- Boys' EuroHockey U18 Championship
- Women's EuroHockey U21 Championship
