= 2025 Boys' EuroHockey U18 Championship =

European hockey contest

Tournament details
- Host country: France
- City: Lille
- Dates: 13–19 July
- Teams: 8 (from 1 confederation)
- Venue: Lille MHC

Final positions
- Champions: Germany (6th title)
- Runner-up: France
- Third place: Belgium

Tournament statistics
- Matches played: 20
- Goals scored: 115 (5.75 per match)
- Top scorer: (Germany) John Dammertz (8 goals)

The 2025 Boys' EuroHockey U18 Championship was the 13th edition of the Boys' EuroHockey U18 Championship, the biennial international men's under-18 field hockey championship of Europe organized by the European Hockey Federation.

The tournament was held alongside the girls' tournament at Lille MHC in Lille, France from 13 to 19 July 2025. Germany were the two-time defending champions. They defended their title by defeating the hosts France 3–2 in a shoot-out after the final finished 1–1. It was a record-extending sixth title for Germany, while France won their first U18 Championship medal as they advanced from the preliminary round for the first time. Belgium won the bronze medal by defeating Spain 3–0 in a shoot-out after the match finished 1–1.

== Qualification ==
Participating nations qualified based on their final ranking from the 2023 competition.

Dates	Event	Location	Quotas	Qualifier(s)
8–16 July 2023	2023 EuroHockey U18 Championship	Krefeld, Germany	6	Belgium; England; Germany; Netherlands; Scotland; Spain
9–15 July 2023	2023 EuroHockey U18 Championship II	Swansea, Wales	1	Czech Republic
10–15 July 2023	2023 EuroHockey U18 Championship II	Alanya, Turkey	1	France
Total			8	

== Preliminary round ==
=== Pool A ===
Pos	Team	Pld	W	D	L	GF	GA	GD	Pts	Qualification
1	Spain	3	2	1	0	10	0	+10	7	Semi-finals
2	Germany	3	1	2	0	22	3	+19	5	Semi-finals
3	England	3	1	1	1	7	8	−1	4	
4	Czech Republic	3	0	0	3	1	29	−28	0	

Source: EHF
Rules for classification: 1) points; 2) matches won; 3) goal difference; 4) goals for; 5) head-to-head result; 6) field goals for.

13 July 2025
17:45

Spain	6–0	Czech Republic
Vidosa 13'; M. Garcia 17', 36'; Fanlo 41'; Coral 49'; Bulta 56'	Report

Pitch 2
Umpires:
Benjamin Messerli (SUI)
Sam Church (ENG)

13 July 2025
18:05

Germany	3–3	England
Von Falck 26'; Möltgen 36'; Dammertz 60'	Report	Sumner 11'; Barber 15'; Davies 49'

Pitch 1
Umpires:
Thalia Bellemans (BEL)
Enzo Saleine (FRA)

15 July 2025
14:45

England	4–1	Czech Republic
Barber 23'; Hippe 26'; Mead 30'; Horsler 40'	Report	Míka 18'

Pitch 1
Umpires:
Charly Cordeau (FRA)
Tim Hart (SCO)

15 July 2025
17:00

Spain	0–0	Germany
	Report

Pitch 1
Umpires:
Arlette Bloks (NED)
Benjamin Messerli (SUI)

16 July 2025
14:45

Germany	19–0	Czech Republic
Dammertz 9', 12', 29', 32', 39', 52', 60'; Stauder 9', 24', 34', 43'; Von Falck 14'; Möntgen 16', 33', 57'; Reissinger 22'; Warweg 35', 37'; Von Strantz 38'	Report

Pitch 2
Umpires:
Louis De Clerq (BEL)
Miriam Gerö (AUT)

16 July 2025
15:05

England	0–4	Spain
	Report	Fanlo 7', 58'; M. Garcia 12'; Trujillo 23'

Pitch 1
Umpires:
Thomas Hinsken (GER)
Thalia Bellemans (BEL)

=== Pool B ===
Pos	Team	Pld	W	D	L	GF	GA	GD	Pts	Qualification
1	Belgium	3	3	0	0	13	3	+10	9	Semi-finals
2	France (H)	3	2	0	1	9	4	+5	6	Semi-finals
3	Netherlands	3	1	0	2	5	4	+1	3	
4	Scotland	3	0	0	3	2	18	−16	0	

Source: EHF
Rules for classification: 1) points; 2) matches won; 3) goal difference; 4) goals for; 5) head-to-head result; 6) field goals for.
(H) Hosts

13 July 2025
15:30

Belgium	9–1	Scotland
Poels 18', 44'; De Wagheneire 24'; Mourabit 28', 41', 55'; Lamalle 32'; Goisse 53'; Leeuw 59'	Report	Leiper 47'

Pitch 2
Umpires:
Miriam Gerö (AUT)
Tobiáš Chládek (CZE)

13 July 2025
15:50

Netherlands	1–2	France
Wehmeyer 52'	Report	Barbier 24'; Crepy-Gueniot 36'

Pitch 1
Umpires:
Thomas Hinsken (GER)
Emilia Lozano (ESP)

14 July 2025
13:30

Netherlands	1–2	Belgium
Houben 19'	Report	Leeuw 22'; Poels 54'

Pitch 1
Umpires:
Xabier Lopez (ESP)
Sam Church (ENG)

14 July 2025
18:00

Scotland	1–6	France
Moulson 30'	Report	Scholz 13'; Loussif 15'; Crepy-Gueniot 29'; Martinache 36'; J. Michaelis 44'; Metzke 50'

Pitch 1
Umpires:
Marc van Tuijl (NED)
Maya Antia-Frese (GER)

16 July 2025
17:00

Scotland	0–3	Netherlands
	Report	Van Aalderen 3'; Rap 24'; Krop 47'

Pitch 2
Umpires:
Tanya Sargeant (ENG)
Enzo Saleine (FRA)

16 July 2025
17:20

Belgium	2–1	France
De Wagheneire 24'; Hanquet 33'	Report	Barbier 39'

Pitch 1
Umpires:
Marc van Tuijl (NED)
Emilia Lozano (ESP)

== Fifth to eighth place classification ==
The points obtained in the preliminary round against the other team were carried over.

=== Pool C ===
Pos	Team	Pld	W	D	L	GF	GA	GD	Pts	Relegation
1	Netherlands	3	3	0	0	20	3	+17	9	
2	England	3	1	1	1	6	6	0	4	
3	Scotland (R)	3	1	1	1	5	7	−2	4	EuroHockey U18 Championship II
4	Czech Republic (R)	3	0	0	3	6	21	−15	0	EuroHockey U18 Championship II

Source: EHF
Rules for classification: 1) points; 2) matches won; 3) goal difference; 4) goals for; 5) head-to-head result; 6) field goals for.
(R) Relegated

18 July 2025
10:00

Czech Republic	3–4	Scotland
Kirschnek 39'; Smysl 39', 54'	Report	Leiper 5'; Millar 23'; McGrane 46'; Calder 51'

Pitch 2
Umpires:
Noemi Di Bella (ITA)
Benjamin Messerli (SUI)

18 July 2025
12:15

England	1–4	Netherlands
Bennett 28'	Report	Uffen 21'; Schoofs 34'; Bunte 46'; Krop 51'

Pitch 2
Umpires:
Louis De Clerq (BEL)
Enzo Cordeau (FRA)

19 July 2025
10:00

Netherlands	13–2	Czech Republic
Van Aalderen 17', 39', 48'; Uffen 19', 56'; Rap 22', 60'; Houben 30'; Krop 36', 51'; Kummer 43'; Bunte 50'; Corstens 58'	Report	Toms 29'; Chadima 60'

Pitch 1
Umpires:
Xabier Lopez (ESP)
Tim Hart (SCO)

19 July 2025
10:20

England	1–1	Scotland
Bennett 13'	Report	Leiper 49'

Pitch 2
Umpires:
Thomas Hinsken (GER)
Arlette Bloks (NED)

== First to fourth place classification ==
=== Bracket ===
Semi-finals
18 July
Spain	2
France	3
18 July
Belgium	3
Germany	5

Final
19 July
France	1 (2)
Germany (s.o.)	1 (3)
Third place
19 July
Spain	1 (0)
Belgium (s.o.)	1 (3)

=== Semi-finals ===
18 July 2025
10:20

Belgium	3–5	Germany
Poels 38'; Lamalle 50'; Leeuw 54'	Report	Warweg 3'; Scholz 21'; Von Falck 26', 43'; Von Stranz 30'

Pitch 1
Umpires:
Xabier Lopez (ESP)
Arlette Bloks (NED)

18 July 2025
12:35

Spain	2–3	France
Alvarez 9'; Fanlo 41'	Report	J. Michaelis 3'; Crepy-Gueniot 33'; Chiarelli 45'

Pitch 1
Umpires:
Thomas Hinsken (GER)
Sam Church (ENG)

=== Third and fourth place ===
19 July 2025
12:15

Spain	1–1	Belgium
Alvarez 12'	Report	François 51'
Penalties
Trujillo (penalty shoot-out missed); Vidosa (penalty shoot-out missed); Serrano (penalty shoot-out missed)	0–3	(penalty shoot-out scored) Winners; (penalty shoot-out scored) François; (penalty shoot-out scored) De Wagheneire

Pitch 1
Umpires:
Sam Church (ENG)
Enzo Saleine (FRA)

=== Final ===
19 July 2025
16:45

France	1–1	Germany
Scholz 10'	Report	Möntgen 34'
Penalties
A. Michaelis (penalty shoot-out scored); J. Michaelis (penalty shoot-out missed); Martinache (penalty shoot-out scored); Gellens (penalty shoot-out missed); Crepy-Gueniot (penalty shoot-out missed); A. Michaelis (penalty shoot-out missed)	2–3	(penalty shoot-out scored) Warweg; (penalty shoot-out missed) Stauder; (penalty shoot-out scored) Von Strantz; (penalty shoot-out missed) Dammertz; (penalty shoot-out missed) Holland; (penalty shoot-out scored) Warweg

Pitch 1
Umpires:
Benjamin Messerli (SUI)
Marc van Tuijl (NED)

== Statistics ==
=== Final standings ===
Pos	Team	Relegation
1st place, gold medalist(s)	Germany (C)	
2nd place, silver medalist(s)	France (H)	
3rd place, bronze medalist(s)	Belgium	
4	Spain	
5	Netherlands	
6	England	
7	Scotland (R)	EuroHockey U18 Championship II
8	Czech Republic (R)	EuroHockey U18 Championship II

Source: EHF
(C) Champion; (H) Host; (R) Relegated

=== Goalscorers ===
There were 115 goals scored in 20 matches, for an average of 5.75 goals per match.

8 goals

- (Germany) John Dammertz

5 goals

- (Germany) Carl Möltgen

4 goals

- (Belgium) Jayd Poels
- (Germany) Julius von Falck
- (Germany) Julius Stauder
- (Netherlands) Teun van Aalderen
- (Netherlands) Juup Krop
- (Spain) Enrique Fanlo

3 goals

- (Belgium) Félix Leeuw
- (Belgium) Yu-Jin Mourabit
- (France) Dimitri Crepy-Gueniot
- (Germany) Caius Warweg
- (Netherlands) Floris Rap
- (Netherlands) Olivier Uffen
- (Scotland) Matthew Leiper
- (Spain) Mario Garcia

2 goals

- (Belgium) Gabriel De Wagheneire
- (Belgium) Tomi Lamalle
- (Czech Republic) Antonín Smysl
- (England) William Barber
- (England) Olly Bennett
- (France) Paul Barbier
- (France) Luca Scholz
- (France) Joseph Michaelis
- (Germany) Carl von Stranz
- (Netherlands) Jurre Bunte
- (Netherlands) Boaz Houben
- (Spain) Gonzalo Alvarez

1 goal

- (Belgium) Mathias François
- (Belgium) Léopold Goisse
- (Belgium) Tom Hanquet
- (Czech Republic) Petr Chadima
- (Czech Republic) Timon Kirschnek
- (Czech Republic) Štĕpán Míka
- (Czech Republic) František Toms
- (England) Freddie Davies
- (England) Moritz Hippe
- (England) Oliver Horsler
- (England) Thomas Mead
- (England) Nathan Sumner
- (France) Martin Chiarelli
- (France) Achille Loussif
- (France) Malo Martinache
- (France) Noah Metzke
- (Germany) Hans Reissinger
- (Germany) Vincent Scholz
- (Netherlands) Lucas Corstens
- (Netherlands) Jimi Kummer
- (Netherlands) Olivier Schoofs
- (Netherlands) Mees Wehmeyer
- (Scotland) Finlay Calder
- (Scotland) Andrew McGrane
- (Scotland) Angus Millar
- (Scotland) Ben Moulson
- (Spain) Carlos Bulta
- (Spain) Quim Coral
- (Spain) Jan Trujillo
- (Spain) Arnau Vidosa

Source: EHF

== See also ==
- 2025 Girls' EuroHockey U18 Championship
