= 2013 Boys' EuroHockey Youth Championships =

Tournament details
- Host country: Austria
- City: Vienna
- Dates: 22–28 July
- Teams: 8
- Venue: HC Wien

Final positions
- Champions: Spain (1st title)
- Runner-up: Germany
- Third place: Netherlands

Tournament statistics
- Matches played: 20
- Goals scored: 93 (4.65 per match)
- Top scorer: (Germany) Tom Grambusch (5 goals)
- Best player: (Germany) Tom Grambusch

The 2015 Boys' EuroHockey Youth Championships was the 7th edition of the Boys' EuroHockey Youth Championships. It was held from 22 to 28 July 2013 in Vienna, Austria at HC Wien.

Belgium were the defending champions. Austria and Scotland were promoted from the Youth Championship II.

== Qualified teams ==
- Austria ▲
- Belgium
- England
- France
- Germany
- Netherlands
- Scotland ▲
- Spain

== Format ==
The eight teams will be split into two groups of four teams. The top two teams advance to the semifinals to determine the winner in a knockout system. The bottom two teams play in a new group with the teams they did not play against in the group stage. The last two teams will be relegated to the Youth Championship II.

== Results ==
All times are local (UTC+2).

=== Preliminary round ===
==== Pool A ====
Pos	Team	Pld	W	D	L	GF	GA	GD	Pts	Qualification
1	England	3	2	0	1	7	3	+4	6	Semifinals
2	Netherlands	3	2	0	1	7	5	+2	6	Semifinals
3	Austria (H)	3	1	0	2	5	7	−2	3	
4	Belgium	3	1	0	2	3	7	−4	3	

Source: EHF
Rules for classification: 1) points; 2) goal difference; 3) goals scored; 4) head-to-head result.
(H) Hosts

22 July 2013
15:00

Belgium	0–3	England
	Report	Griffiths 14'; Albery 32', 56'

Umpires:
Ben Göntgen (GER)
Antoine Duhem (FRA)

22 July 2013
17:00

Netherlands	3–2	Austria
Do. Aarts 5'; Burkhardt 23'; Prins 50'	Report	Binder 39'; Steyrer 50'

Umpires:
Ignasi Petanas (ESP)
Alexander Fedenczuk (SCO)

24 July 2013
15:00

Netherlands	3–0	Belgium
	Report

Umpires:
Alexander Fedenczuk (SCO)
Ben Göntgen (GER)

24 July 2013
17:00

England	1–2	Austria
Simpson 69'	Report	Thörnblom 22'; Schmidt 50'

Umpires:
Antoine Duhem (FRA)
Ignasi Petanas (ESP)

25 July 2013
15:00

England	3–1	Netherlands
	Report

Umpires:
Ben Göntgen (GER)
Ignasi Petanas (ESP)

25 July 2013
17:00

Belgium	3–1	Austria
	Report

Umpires:
Vincenzo Ilgrande (ITA)
Alexander Fedenczuk (SCO)

==== Pool B ====
Pos	Team	Pld	W	D	L	GF	GA	GD	Pts	Qualification
1	Germany	3	3	0	0	18	2	+16	9	Semifinals
2	Spain	3	2	0	1	9	7	+2	6	Semifinals
3	Scotland	3	1	0	2	5	17	−12	3	
4	France	3	0	0	3	5	11	−6	0	

Source: EHF
Rules for classification: 1) points; 2) goal difference; 3) goals scored; 4) head-to-head result.

22 July 2013
11:00

Spain	3–1	France
Coll 3'; Lara 12'; Tarrés 55'	Report	Bainvel 26'

Umpires:
Vincenzo Ilgrande (ITA)
Pieter Hembrecht (NED)

22 July 2013
13:00

Germany	9–0	Scotland
Trompertz 3', 55'; Staib 7', 19'; Grünenwald 13', 32'; Grambusch 24'; Kaufmann 27'; Weinke 66'	Report

Umpires:
Nicholas Bennett (ENG)
Friedrich Weiland (AUT)

23 July 2013
15:00

France	3–4	Scotland
Pacheco 4'; Delobelle 25'; Peters-Deutz 59'	Report	McKenzie 5'; McCrossan 16'; Sandison 37'; Robb 68'

Umpires:
Pieter Hembrecht (NED)
Nathan Stenier (BEL)

23 July 2013
17:00

Germany	5–1	Spain
Windfeder 8', 49', 55'; Willemsen 29'; Schmiedel 34'	Report	Lara 15'

Umpires:
Nicholas Bennett (ENG)
Vincenzo Ilgrande (ITA)

25 July 2013
11:00

Spain	5–1	Scotland
Coll 28', 35+'; Puente 36', 54'; L. García 43'	Report	Cain 33'

Umpires:
Nathan Stenier (BEL)
Nicholas Bennett (ENG)

25 July 2013
13:00

France	1–4	Germany
Dominik 50'	Report	Grambusch 20', 23'; Schmiedel 46'; Sweering 68'

Umpires:
Friedrich Weiland (AUT)
Pieter Hembrecht (NED)

=== Classification round ===
==== Fifth to eighth place classification ====
===== Pool C =====
Pos	Team	Pld	W	D	L	GF	GA	GD	Pts	Relegation
1	Belgium	3	3	0	0	14	2	+12	9	
2	Scotland	3	1	1	1	5	9	−4	4	
3	France	3	1	0	2	5	10	−5	3	Relegated to 2015 EuroHockey Youth Championship II
4	Austria (H)	3	0	1	2	2	5	−3	1	Relegated to 2015 EuroHockey Youth Championship II

Source: EHF
Rules for classification: 1) points; 2) goal difference; 3) goals scored; 4) head-to-head result.
(H) Hosts

27 July 2013
11:00

Belgium	6–1	France
	Report

Umpires:
Alexander Fedenczuk (SCO)
Friedrich Weiland (AUT)

27 July 2013
13:00

Austria	1–1	Scotland
Lindengrün 18'	Report	Sandison 5'

Umpires:
Ben Göntgen (GER)
Nathan Stenier (BEL)

28 July 2013
10:30

Austria	0–1	France
	Report	Dominik 56'

Umpires:
Nathan Stenier (BEL)
Alexander Fedenczuk (SCO)

28 July 2013
12:30

Scotland	0–5	Belgium
	Report	Van Lindhoudt 22', 52', 59'; Struyf 39', 57'

Umpires:
Antoine Duhem (FRA)
Ignasi Petanas (ESP)

==== First to fourth place classification ====
Semi-finals
27 July 2013
England	1
Spain	3
27 July 2013
Germany	3
Netherlands	0

Final
28 July 2013
Spain	5
Germany	2
Third place
28 July 2013
England	2
Netherlands	3

===== Semi-finals =====
27 July 2013
15:00

Germany	3–0	Netherlands
Windfeder 34'; Staib 53'; Grambusch 70'	Report

Umpires:
Ignasi Petanas (ESP)
Nicholas Bennett (ENG)

27 July 2013
17:30

England	1–3	Spain
Ruíz 53'	Report	18'; Lara 29', 46'

Umpires:
Pieter Hembrecht (NED)
Vincenzo Ilgrande (ITA)

===== Third and fourth place =====
28 July 2013
15:00

England	2–3	Netherlands
Poustie 48'; Albery 57'	Report	Den Boer 14'; J. Luijkx 51'; Burkhardt 69'

Umpires:
Vincenzo Ilgrande (ITA)
Ben Göntgen (GER)

===== Final =====
28 July 2013
17:30

Spain	5–2	Germany
Sanz 5', 48'; E. González 42'; X. González 62'; Coll 63'	Report	Grambusch 19'; Willemsen 69'

Umpires:
Nicholas Bennett (ENG)
Pieter Hembrecht (NED)

== Statistics ==
=== Final standings ===
As per statistical convention in field hockey, matches decided in extra time are counted as wins and losses, while matches decided by penalty shoot-outs are counted as draws.

Pos	Team	Pld	W	D	L	GF	GA	GD	Pts	Status
1st place, gold medalist(s)	Spain	5	4	0	1	17	10	+7	12	Tournament Champion
2nd place, silver medalist(s)	Germany	5	4	0	1	23	7	+16	12	
3rd place, bronze medalist(s)	Netherlands	5	3	0	2	10	10	0	9	
4	England	5	2	0	3	10	9	+1	6	
5	Belgium	5	3	0	2	14	8	+6	9	
6	Scotland	5	1	1	3	6	23	−17	4	
7	France	5	1	0	4	7	17	−10	3	Relegated to 2015 EuroHockey Youth Championship II
8	Austria (H)	5	1	1	3	6	9	−3	4	Relegated to 2015 EuroHockey Youth Championship II

Source: EHF
(H) Hosts
