= Field hockey at the Central American and Caribbean Games =

- Most recent season or competition: Field hockey at the 2026 Central American and Caribbean Games
- Sport: Field hockey
- Founded: 1982; 44 years ago
- First season: 1982
- No. of teams: 8
- Region: Central American; Caribbean
- Confederation: PAHF
- Most recent champions: M: Cuba (9th title); W: Cuba (6th title) (2026)
- Most titles: M: Cuba (9 titles); W: Cuba (6 titles)

The Field hockey competition at the Central American and Caribbean Games is an international field hockey event organized by the Central American and Caribbean Sports Organization (CACSO) as part of the Central American and Caribbean Games. The men's competition was introduced in 1982, and women's field hockey competition was first organized during the 1986 games. The winning teams qualify for the next Pan American Games.

== Men's tournament ==
=== Results ===
Year	Host	Gold medal match			Bronze medal match			Number of teams
Year	Host	Gold medal	Score	Silver medal	Bronze medal	Score	Fourth place	Number of teams
1982; Details	Havana, Cuba	Cuba	3–1	Mexico	Barbados	0–0 (a.e.t.) (21–20 p.s.)	Trinidad and Tobago	6
1986; Details	Santiago, Dominican Republic	Cuba	2–1	Mexico	Trinidad and Tobago	2–0	Barbados	6
1990; Details	Mexico City, Mexico	Cuba	?–?	Venezuela	Mexico	?–?	Trinidad and Tobago	6
1993; Details	Ponce, Puerto Rico	Cuba	?–?	Trinidad and Tobago	Mexico	?–?	Barbados	8
1998; Details	Caracas, Venezuela	Cuba	2–0	Mexico	Trinidad and Tobago	0–0 (a.e.t.) (?–? p.s.)	Barbados	7
2002; Details	Puerto Rico	Trinidad and Tobago	3–2	Barbados	Mexico	2–1	Venezuela	6
2006; Details	Santo Domingo, Dominican Republic	Cuba	2–2 (a.e.t.) (4–3 p.s.)	Trinidad and Tobago	Netherlands Antilles	4–3 (a.e.t.)	Mexico	8
2010; Details	Mayagüez, Puerto Rico	Mexico	3–2	Trinidad and Tobago	Barbados	3–0	Netherlands Antilles	8
2014; Details	Veracruz, Mexico	Cuba	5–1	Trinidad and Tobago	Mexico	1–1 (5–4 s.o.)	Barbados	7
2018; Details	Barranquilla, Colombia	Cuba	2–0	Mexico	Trinidad and Tobago	5–0	Guyana	8
2023; Details	Santo Domingo, Dominican Republic	Mexico	5–1	Trinidad and Tobago	Cuba	4–2	Barbados	8
2026; Details	Santo Domingo, Dominican Republic	Cuba	2–2 (2–1 s.o.)	Trinidad and Tobago	Mexico	5–1	Venezuela	8

=== Summary ===
Team	Gold medal	Silver medal	Bronze medal	Fourth place
Cuba	9 (1982*, 1986, 1990, 1993, 1998, 2006, 2014, 2018, 2026)		1 (2023)	
Mexico	2 (2010, 2023)	4 (1982, 1986, 1998, 2018)	5 (1990*, 1993, 2002, 2014*, 2026)	1 (2006)
Trinidad and Tobago	1 (2002)	6 (1993, 2006, 2010, 2014, 2023, 2026)	3 (1986, 1998, 2018)	2 (1982, 1990)
Barbados		1 (2002)	2 (1982, 2010)	5 (1986, 1993, 1998, 2014, 2023)
Venezuela		1 (1990)		2 (2002, 2026)
Netherlands Antilles			1 (2006)	1 (2010)
Guyana				1 (2018)

* = hosts

=== Team appearances ===
Team	(Cuba) 1982	(Dominican Republic) 1986	(Mexico) 1990	(Puerto Rico) 1993	(Venezuela) 1998	(Puerto Rico) 2002	(Dominican Republic) 2006	(Puerto Rico) 2010	(Mexico) 2014	(Colombia) 2018	(Dominican Republic) 2023	(Dominican Republic) 2026	Total
Barbados	3rd	4th	–	4th	4th	2nd	5th	3rd	4th	5th	4th	7th	11
Bermuda	–	5th	6th	8th	–	–	–	–	–	–	–	–	3
Cuba	1st	1st	1st	1st	1st	–	1st	–	1st	1st	3rd	1st	10
Dominican Republic	–	–	–	–	–	–	8th	5th	5th	8th	5th	5th	6
El Salvador	–	–	–	–	–	–	–	–	–	–	8th	–	1
Guatemala	–	–	–	–	–	–	–	–	7th	7th	–	8th	3
Guyana	–	–	–	5th	–	–	–	–	–	4th	7th	–	3
Jamaica	5th	–	5th	–	6th	6th	–	7th	6th	6th	6th	6th	9
Mexico	2nd	2nd	3rd	3rd	2nd	3rd	4th	1st	3rd	2nd	1st	3rd	12
Netherlands Antilles	–	–	–	–	–	–	3rd	4th	Defunct				2
Panama	–	–	–	–	–	–	–	8th	–	–	–	–	1
Puerto Rico	6th	6th	–	7th	5th	5th	7th	6th	–	–	–	–	7
Trinidad and Tobago	4th	3rd	4th	2nd	3rd	1st	2nd	2nd	2nd	3rd	2nd	2nd	12
Venezuela	–	–	2nd	6th	7th	4th	6th	–	–	–	–	4th	6
Total	6	6	6	8	7	6	8	8	7	8	8	8	

== Women's tournament ==
=== Results ===
Year	Host	Gold medal match			Bronze medal match			Number of teams
Year	Host	Gold medal	Score	Silver medal	Bronze medal	Score	Fourth place	Number of teams
1986; Details	Santiago, Dominican Republic	Trinidad and Tobago	1–0	Jamaica	Barbados	2–0	Mexico	7
1990; Details	Mexico City, Mexico	Jamaica	?–?	Mexico	Trinidad and Tobago	?–?	Cuba	5
1993; Details	Ponce, Puerto Rico	Cuba	?–?	Jamaica	Trinidad and Tobago	?–?	Barbados	6
1998; Details	Caracas, Venezuela	Cuba	?–?	Mexico	Jamaica	?–?	Barbados	6
2002; Details	Puerto Rico	Trinidad and Tobago	3–1	Jamaica	Barbados	6–1	Mexico	6
2006; Details	Santo Domingo, Dominican Republic	Cuba	3–2	Netherlands Antilles	Barbados	4–2	Trinidad and Tobago	8
2010; Details	Mayagüez, Puerto Rico	Trinidad and Tobago	4–0	Mexico	Barbados	3–1	Dominican Republic	8
2014; Details	Veracruz, Mexico	Cuba	3–3 (4–3 s.o.)	Dominican Republic	Mexico	2–1	Trinidad and Tobago	8
2018; Details	Barranquilla, Colombia	Cuba	1–0	Mexico	Trinidad and Tobago	2–0	Barbados	8
2023; Details	Santo Domingo, Dominican Republic	Mexico	1–1 (3–2 s.o.)	Cuba	Barbados	2–2 (4–2 s.o.)	Dominican Republic	8
2026; Details	Santo Domingo, Dominican Republic	Cuba	0–0 (2–0 s.o.)	Mexico	Venezuela	4–1	Barbados	8

=== Summary ===
Team	Gold medal	Silver medal	Bronze medal	Fourth place
Cuba	6 (1993, 1998, 2006, 2014, 2018, 2026)	1 (2023)		1 (1990)
Trinidad and Tobago	3 (1986, 2002, 2010)		3 (1990, 1993, 2018)	2 (2006, 2014)
Mexico	1 (2023)	5 (1990*, 1998, 2010, 2018, 2026)	1 (2014*)	2 (1986, 2002)
Jamaica	1 (2010)	3 (1986, 1993, 2002)	1 (1998)	
Dominican Republic		1 (2014)		2 (2010, 2023*)
Netherlands Antilles		1 (2006)		
Barbados			5 (1986, 2002, 2006, 2010, 2023)	4 (1993, 1998, 2018, 2026)
Venezuela			1 (2026)	

* = hosts

=== Team appearances ===
Team	(Dominican Republic) 1986	(Mexico) 1990	(Puerto Rico) 1993	(Venezuela) 1998	(Puerto Rico) 2002	(Dominican Republic) 2006	(Puerto Rico) 2010	(Mexico) 2014	(Colombia) 2018	(Dominican Republic) 2023	(Dominican Republic) 2026	Total
Bahamas	6th	–	–	–	–	–	–	–	–	–	–	1
Barbados	3rd	–	4th	4th	3rd	3rd	3rd	5th	4th	3rd	4th	10
Bermuda	7th	5th	6th	5th	6th	7th	8th	8th	–	8th	8th	10
Cuba	5th	4th	1st	1st	–	1st	–	1st	1st	2nd	1st	9
Dominican Republic	–	–	–	–	–	8th	4th	2nd	5th	4th	5th	6
Guatemala	–	–	–	–	–	–	–	–	8th	–	–	1
Guyana	–	–	–	–	–	–	5th	6th	7th	–	–	3
Jamaica	2nd	1st	2nd	3rd	2nd	5th	6th	7th	6th	5th	7th	11
Mexico	4th	2nd	5th	2nd	4th	6th	2nd	3rd	2nd	1st	2nd	11
Netherlands Antilles	–	–	–	–	–	2nd	–	Defunct				1
Puerto Rico	–	–	–	–	5th	–	7th	–	–	7th	6th	4
Trinidad and Tobago	1st	3rd	3rd	–	1st	4th	1st	4th	3rd	6th	–	9
Venezuela	–	–	–	6th	–	–	–	–	–	–	3rd	2
Total	7	5	6	6	6	8	8	8	8	8	8	

== Medal table ==
=== Total ===
Rank	Nation	Gold	Silver	Bronze	Total
1	Cuba (CUB)	15	1	1	17
2	Trinidad and Tobago (TTO)	4	6	6	16
3	Mexico (MEX)	3	9	6	18
4	Jamaica (JAM)	1	3	1	5
5	Barbados (BAR)	0	1	7	8
6	Netherlands Antilles (AHO)	0	1	1	2
6	Venezuela (VEN)	0	1	1	2
8	Dominican Republic (DOM)	0	1	0	1
Totals (8 entries)		23	23	23	69

=== Men ===
Rank	Nation	Gold	Silver	Bronze	Total
1	Cuba	9	0	1	10
2	Mexico	2	4	5	11
3	Trinidad and Tobago	1	6	3	10
4	Barbados	0	1	2	3
5	Venezuela	0	1	0	1
6	Netherlands Antilles	0	0	1	1
Totals (6 entries)		12	12	12	36

=== Women ===
Rank	Nation	Gold	Silver	Bronze	Total
1	Cuba	6	1	0	7
2	Trinidad and Tobago	3	0	3	6
3	Mexico	1	5	1	7
4	Jamaica	1	3	1	5
5	Dominican Republic	0	1	0	1
5	Netherlands Antilles	0	1	0	1
7	Barbados	0	0	5	5
8	Venezuela	0	0	1	1
Totals (8 entries)		11	11	11	33
