= 2014–15 Women's FIH Hockey World League Round 1 =

Hockey League

The 2014–15 Women's FIH Hockey World League Round 1 was held from June to December 2014. A total of 31 teams competing in 7 events were part in this round of the tournament playing for 15 berths in the Round 2, played in February and March 2015.

== Teams ==
Each national association member of the International Hockey Federation (FIH) had the opportunity to compete in the tournament. Teams ranked 21st and lower in the FIH World Rankings current at the time of seeking entries for the competition at early 2013 were allocated to one of the Round 1 events. The following 31 teams, shown with final pre-tournament rankings, competed in this round of the tournament.

- Austria (29)
- Barbados (41)
- Belarus (21)
- Canada (23)
- Czech Republic (37)
- Dominican Republic (51)
- Fiji (59)
- France (25)
- Guatemala
- Hong Kong (47)
- Kazakhstan (33)
- Kenya (43)
- Jamaica (39)
- Lithuania (34)
- Malaysia (22)
- Mexico (30)
- Myanmar
- Papua New Guinea (61)
- Peru
- Poland (28)
- Puerto Rico (62)
- Samoa (60)
- Singapore (49)
- Sri Lanka (53)
- Tanzania
- Thailand (36)
- Trinidad and Tobago (27)
- Turkey (42)
- Ukraine (24)
- Vanuatu
- Zimbabwe (45)

The teams were split into regional tournaments. Asian teams played at Singapore, Africans played in Kenya, and Oceanians played in Fiji. European teams were split into Lithuania and Czech Republic. Caribbean teams played in Jamaica, and the remaining American teams played in Mexico.

== Singapore ==
- Singapore, 21–26 June 2014.

All times are Singapore Standard Time (UTC+08:00)

=== First round ===
==== Pool A ====
Team	Pld	W	D	L	GF	GA	GD	Pts
Malaysia (A)	2	2	0	0	24	0	+24	6
Singapore (A)	2	1	0	1	4	10	−6	3
Sri Lanka	2	0	0	2	0	18	−18	0

(A) Advanced to semifinals

21 June 2014
19:15

Malaysia	14–0	Sri Lanka
Mohamed 7', 15', 46'; Rashid 8', 23', 28', 44'; Ruhani 10'; Sumantri 17'; Ali 21'; Mat Isa 26'; Onn 31', 33'; Hashim 62'	Report

Umpires:
Amina Dyussembekova (KAZ)
Tang Shi Him (HKG)

22 June 2014
19:15

Singapore	0–10	Malaysia
	Report	Rashid 5'; Mohamad 18'; Hashim 21'; Mohamed 40'; Ali 41', 69'; Sylvester 56', 61', 67'; Sumantri 58'

Umpires:
Kim Yoon-seon (KOR)
Liu Xiaoying (CHN)

23 June 2014
19:15

Sri Lanka	0–4	Singapore
	Report	Tan Laura 7'; Ong Tiffany 17'; Sanip 20'; Chan Ivy 37'

Umpires:
Thanittha Chuangmanichot (THA)
Liu Xiaoying (CHN)

==== Pool B ====
Team	Pld	W	D	L	GF	GA	GD	Pts
Kazakhstan (A)	3	3	0	0	13	0	+13	9
Thailand (A)	3	2	0	1	7	2	+5	6
Hong Kong	3	1	0	2	4	12	−8	3
Myanmar	3	0	0	3	0	10	−10	0

(A) Advanced to semifinals

21 June 2014
14:45

Kazakhstan	2–0	Thailand
Domashneva 44'; Bauyrzhanova 69'	Report

Umpires:
Kim Yoon-seon (KOR)
Annie Thomas (MAS)

21 June 2014
17:00

Hong Kong	4–0	Myanmar
Yii Sui Suet 2'; Law Ka Mun Melissa 16'; Chow Wing Man 33'; Chan Yin Ching Tiffany 40'	Report

Umpires:
Liu Xiaoying (CHN)
Tan Koon Kim (SIN)

22 June 2014
14:45

Thailand	4–0	Myanmar
Samanso 28'; Sakunpithak 53'; Duangurai 61'; Sanpoung 70'	Report

Umpires:
Tang Shi Him (HKG)
Tan Koon Kim (SIN)

22 June 2014
17:00

Hong Kong	0–9	Kazakhstan
	Report	Sazontova 3', 45'; Domashneva 24', 25', 51'; Gataulina 42'; Bauyrzhanova 56', 66'; Imangaliyeva 61'

Umpires:
Shiroma Athurupana (SRI)
Thanittha Chuangmanichot (THA)

23 June 2014
14:45

Kazakhstan	2–0	Myanmar
Gataulina 49'; Domashneva 63'	Report

Umpires:
Kim Yoon-seon (KOR)
Shiroma Athurupana (SRI)

23 June 2014
17:00

Thailand	3–0	Hong Kong
Sakunpithak 34'; Yungyuen 43', 55'	Report

Umpires:
Amina Dyussembekova (KAZ)
Annie Thomas (MAS)

=== Fifth to seventh place classification ===
==== Seventh place ====
25 June 2014
14:45

Sri Lanka	4–0	Myanmar
Battagodage 27', 33'; Weerabahu 57'; Wijesooriya 69'	Report

Umpires:
Amina Dyussembekova (KAZ)
Tan Koon Kim (SIN)

==== Fifth and sixth place ====
26 June 2014
14:45

Sri Lanka	7–0	Hong Kong
Wijesooriya 35', 39', 52'; Battagodage 42', 63', 70'; Konnasingha 61'	Report

Umpires:
Thanittha Chuangmanichot (THA)
Amina Dyussembekova (KAZ)

=== First to fourth place classification ===
Semifinals
25 June 2014
Thailand	0
Malaysia	8
25 June 2014
Kazakhstan	5
Singapore	1

Final
Malaysia	5
Kazakhstan	0
Third place game
Thailand	4
Singapore	1

==== Semifinals ====
25 June 2014
17:00

Thailand	0–8	Malaysia
	Report	Sumantri 2', 31'; Rahman 7', 38'; Hashim 22'; Din 49'; Rashid 50', 63'

Umpires:
Liu Xiaoying (CHN)
Kim Yoon-seon (KOR)

25 June 2014
19:15

Kazakhstan	5–1	Singapore
Domashneva 28', 40'; Makhanova 34'; Mukasheva 41'; Gataulina 63'	Report	Ong Tiffany 46'

Umpires:
Annie Thomas (MAS)
Tang Shi Him (HKG)

==== Third and fourth place ====
26 June 2014
17:00

Thailand	4–1	Singapore
Samanso 15'; Sakunpithak 25'; Yungyuen 39'; Duangurai 50'	Report	Ong Tiffany 70'

Umpires:
Shiroma Athurupana (SRI)
Annie Thomas (MAS)

==== Final ====
26 June 2014
19:15

Malaysia	5–0	Kazakhstan
Ali 5', 29'; Rashid 8'; Rahman 32'; Mohamed 64'	Report

Umpires:
Liu Xiaoying (CHN)
Kim Yoon-seon (KOR)

== Šiauliai ==
- Šiauliai, Lithuania, 27–29 June 2014.

=== Pool ===
All times are Eastern European Summer Time (UTC+03:00)

Team	Pld	W	D	L	GF	GA	GD	Pts
Belarus (A)	3	3	0	0	14	5	+9	9
Ukraine (A)	3	2	0	1	5	4	+1	6
Lithuania (A)	3	1	0	2	5	10	−5	3
Poland (A)	3	0	0	3	2	7	−5	0

(A) Advanced to Round 2

27 June 2014
15:00

Belarus	4–1	Poland
Mikheichyk 8', 33', 41'; Silitskaya 58'	Report	Zagajska 53'

Umpires:
Olena Klymenko (UKR)
Dovile Lidaite (LTU)

27 June 2014
17:15

Ukraine	2–1	Lithuania
Samokhodchenko 29'; Khilko 54'	Report	Malyseva 21'

Umpires:
Ivona Makar (CRO)
Karolina Pawlowska (POL)

28 June 2014
14:00

Ukraine	2–3	Belarus
Vynohradova 55', 68'	Report	Mikheichyk 43', 44'; Pakhanava 70'

Umpires:
Karolina Pawlowska (POL)
Ivona Makar (CRO)

28 June 2014
16:15

Poland	1–2	Lithuania
Walasek 54'	Report	Malyseva 23'; Grigiene 50'

Umpires:
Olena Klymenko (UKR)
Liudmila Aleinikoviene (BLR)

29 June 2014
13:30

Poland	0–1	Ukraine
	Report	Shatokhina 31'

Umpires:
Liudmila Aleinikoviene (BLR)
Dovile Lidaite (LTU)

29 June 2014
15:45

Belarus	7–2	Lithuania
Belavusava 6'; Shyntar 24'; Bahushevich 34', 40', 41'; Mikheichyk 52'; Papkova 70'	Report	Kukliene 61'; Grigiene 68'

Umpires:
Ivona Makar (CRO)
Olena Klymenko (UKR)

== Hradec Králové ==
- Hradec Králové, Czech Republic, 5–7 September 2014.

=== Pool ===
All times are Central European Summer Time (UTC+02:00)

Team	Pld	W	SOW	SOL	L	GF	GA	GD	Pts
France (A)	3	2	0	1	0	11	5	+6	7
Austria (A)	3	2	0	0	1	2	2	0	6
Czech Republic (A)	3	1	1	0	1	8	6	+2	5
Turkey	3	0	0	0	3	2	10	−8	0

(A) Advanced to Round 2

5 September 2014
15:30

Austria	1–0	Turkey
Pultar 69'	Report

Umpires:
Celine Martin-Schmets (BEL)
Martina Venclová (CZE)

5 September 2014
17:45

France	4–4	Czech Republic
Sansonetti 6'; Rogeau 8'; Lardeur 33', 65'	Report	Kolářová 3'; Haklová 39'; Bížová 43', 49'
Penalties
Plocque (penalty shoot-out missed); Billore (penalty shoot-out missed); Rogeau (penalty shoot-out missed); Munch (penalty shoot-out scored); Huvelle (penalty shoot-out missed)	1–2	(penalty shoot-out scored) Hráchová; (penalty shoot-out missed) Reinosová; (penalty shoot-out scored) Laciná; (penalty shoot-out missed) Bížová

Umpires:
Esin Öztürk (TUR)
Xenia Ulrich (AUT)

6 September 2014
15:15

Austria	0–2	France
	Report	Billore 5' de Galzain 40'

Umpires:
Celine Martin-Schmets (BEL)
Esin Öztürk (TUR)

6 September 2014
17:30

Czech Republic	4–1	Turkey
Bížová 29'; Haklová 58'; Nováková 63'; Kolářová 66'	Report	Köksal 21'

Umpires:
Yolande Lanzas (FRA)
Xenia Ulrich (AUT)

7 September 2014
13:00

France	5–1	Turkey
Billore 2'; Perrocheau 15', 66'; Rogeau 20', 43'	Report	Köksal 31'

Umpires:
Xenia Ulrich (AUT)
Martina Venclová (CZE)

7 September 2014
17:30

Czech Republic	0–1	Austria
	Report	Schrodt 11'

Umpires:
Yolande Lanzas (FRA)
Celine Martin-Schmets (BEL)

== Nairobi ==
- Nairobi, Kenya, 5–7 September 2014.

=== Pool ===
All times are East Africa Time (UTC+03:00)

Team	Pld	W	D	L	GF	GA	GD	Pts
Kenya (A)	2	2	0	0	23	0	+23	6
Ghana	2	1	0	1	17	1	+16	3
Tanzania	2	0	0	2	0	39	−39	0

(A) Advanced to Round 2

5 September 2014
14:00

Ghana	17–0	Tanzania
Boakye 2', 13', 60'; Amoako 5'; Darko 12'; Bamfo 16', 62'; Mills 27', 41'; Opoku 31', 63'; Aggrey 32', 37', 45', 57'; Sarfoa 36', 47'	Report

Umpires:
Caren Ouma (KEN)
Deborah Agunda (KEN)

6 September 2014
14:00

Kenya	1–0	Ghana
Jowwangeci 26'	Report

Umpires:
Wanri Venter (RSA)
Saleem Hisam (EGY)

7 September 2014
11:00

Tanzania	0–22	Kenya
	Report	Aura 3', 59'; Ommala 7', 18'; Naise 10', 14', 37', 39', 45', 54', 57'; Agunda 20', 44'; Nekesa 22'; Karanja 24', 38', 40'; Mutiva 29'; Namasake 42'; Rotich 61'; Jowwangeci 66', 70'

Umpires:
Cynthia Clement (GHA)
Wanri Venter (RSA)

== Guadalajara ==
- Guadalajara, Mexico, 11–14 September 2014.

=== Pool ===
All times are Central Daylight Time (UTC−06:00)

Team	Pld	W	D	L	GF	GA	GD	Pts
Canada (A)	3	3	0	0	63	0	+63	9
Mexico (A)	3	2	0	1	26	6	+20	6
Peru	3	1	0	2	6	28	−22	3
Guatemala	3	0	0	3	0	61	−61	0

(A) Advanced to Round 2

11 September 2014
14:00

Canada	34–0	Guatemala
B. Stairs 2', 17', 26', 29', 58', 67'; McManus 5'; Raye 7', 32', 33', 54', 63'; Secco 8', 25'; Johansen 11'; Culley 14', 23', 39', 60'; Sandhu 17', 53'; Stewart 18'; Gillis 21', 36', 45', 47'; T. Stairs 31', 49'; Watson 34'; Haughn 42', 50', 55'; Hennig 66'; Sourisseau 70'	Report

Umpires:
Nancy Altamirano (MEX)
Aura Sanchéz (MEX)

11 September 2014
16:15

Mexico	5–0	Peru
M. Correa 6'; Orozco 39'; Campos 49'; Valdes 56'; Morales 69'	Report

Umpires:
Gillian Horgan (CAN)
Suzi Sutton (USA)

13 September 2014
09:30

Mexico	0–6	Canada
	Report	Culley 3', 19'; Johansen 23'; T. Stairs 29'; B. Stairs 47'; McManus 66'

Umpires:
Suzi Sutton (USA)
Devin Hooper (GUY)

13 September 2014
11:45

Guatemala	0–6	Peru
	Report	Ardiles 7', 52'; Moccagatta 11', 29'; Devoto 35'; López 66'

Umpires:
Eugenia Padron (MEX)
Aura Sanchéz (MEX)

14 September 2014
09:30

Canada	23–0	Peru
Johansen 2', 8'; Haughn 4', 4', 31'; Raye 10'; B. Stairs 11', 19', 25', 45', 59', 66'; Stewart 13', 27'; Hennig 22'; McManus 23'; Sandhu 24'; Culley 51'; Gillis 54'; T. Stairs 54', 61', 65'; Barnett 69'	Report

Umpires:
Nancy Altamirano (MEX)
Eugenia Padron (MEX)

14 September 2014
11:45

Guatemala	0–21	Mexico
	Report	Navarro 3', 6', 16', 54', 58', 65', 66'; Bianchi 5'; M. Correa 17', 69'; Orozco 18', 35'; Morales 29', 39'; Valdes 30'; Oviedo 32', 33'; Cota 38'; Juarez 44', 64'; C. Correa 49'

Umpires:
Gillian Horgan (CAN)
Suzi Sutton (USA)

== Kingston ==
- Kingston, Jamaica, 30 September–5 October 2014.

=== Pool ===
All times are Eastern Standard Time (UTC−05:00)

Team	Pld	W	SOW	SOL	L	GF	GA	GD	Pts
Trinidad and Tobago (A)	4	4	0	0	0	12	2	+10	12
Dominican Republic (A)	4	3	0	0	1	16	4	+12	9
Barbados	4	2	0	0	2	6	6	0	6
Puerto Rico	4	0	1	0	3	4	20	−16	2
Jamaica	4	0	0	1	3	2	8	−6	1

(A) Advanced to Round 2

30 September 2014
14:00

Trinidad and Tobago	5–1	Puerto Rico
Lewis 15', 60'; Wynne 51', 69'; Wright-Alexis 57'	Report	J. Delgado 27'

Umpires:
Ana Vázquez (MEX)
Maggie Befort (USA)

30 September 2014
16:30

Dominican Republic	3–0	Jamaica
De la Cruz 25'; Navamuel 38', 61'	Report

Umpires:
Mary Driscoll (USA)
Kecia Jones (TRI)

1 October 2014
11:30

Puerto Rico	1–4	Barbados
J. Delgado 7'	Report	Downes 12'; Brathwaite 29'; King 43'; Moore 55'

Umpires:
Dahianna Lazil (DOM)
Maggie Befort (USA)

1 October 2014
14:00

Dominican Republic	1–3	Trinidad and Tobago
Birocho 17'	Report	Wynne 18'; Govia 34'; Trotman 66'

Umpires:
Ana Vázquez (MEX)
Erica May (JAM)

2 October 2014
14:00

Dominican Republic	2–0	Barbados
Ofla 52'; Birocho 57'	Report

Umpires:
Maggie Befort (USA)
Kecia Jones (TRI)

2 October 2014
16:00

Trinidad and Tobago	2–0	Jamaica
Roach 25'; Wright-Alexis 48'	Report

Umpires:
Mary Driscoll (USA)
Ana Vázquez (MEX)

4 October 2014
09:00

Barbados	0–2	Trinidad and Tobago
	Report	Lewis 24'; Trotman 28'

Umpires:
Ana Vázquez (MEX)
Erica May (JAM)

4 October 2014
16:00

Jamaica	1–1	Puerto Rico
Airey 15'	Report	P. Delgado 53'
Penalties
Griffiths (penalty shoot-out scored); White (penalty shoot-out missed); Cooper (penalty shoot-out missed); Airey (penalty shoot-out missed); Knight (penalty shoot-out missed)	1–2	(penalty shoot-out missed) J. Delgado; (penalty shoot-out scored) Romero; (penalty shoot-out scored) P. Delgado; (penalty shoot-out missed) Rivera

Umpires:
Cara Briggs (BAR)
Mary Driscoll (USA)

5 October 2014
09:00

Puerto Rico	1–10	Dominican Republic
Stewart-Hill 5'	Report	Birocho 2', 10', 15', 54'; Del Pino 17'; De la Cruz 30'; Navamuel 32', 70'; Ortega 50'; Ofla 59'

Umpires:
Kecia Jones (TRI)
Cara Briggs (BAR)

5 October 2014
14:00

Barbados	2–1	Jamaica
King 6'; Wilson 49'	Report	Knight 13'

Umpires:
Mary Driscoll (USA)
Maggie Befort (USA)

== Suva ==
- Suva, Fiji, 6–11 December 2014.

=== Pool ===
All times are Fiji Summer Time (UTC+12:00)

Team	Pld	W	D	L	GF	GA	GD	Pts
Fiji (A)	3	3	0	0	22	1	+21	9
Papua New Guinea	3	2	0	1	9	6	+3	6
Vanuatu	3	1	0	2	3	13	−10	3
Samoa	3	0	0	3	1	15	−14	0

(A) Advanced to Round 2

6 December 2014
14:30

Fiji	10–0	Vanuatu
Fabiano 11', 48'; Dutta 20', 27', 29'; Nautu 38', 50'; Young 45'; Blake 67'; Browne 70'	Report

Umpires:
Lucy Townend (NZL)
Morgan Leeder (AUS)

7 December 2014
16:30

Samoa	1–5	Papua New Guinea
Fagalilo 70'	Report	Terrence 21'; Kiapin 48'; Perry 52', 64'; Fred 58'

Umpires:
Lucy Townend (NZL)
Aleisha Neumann (AUS)

8 December 2014
12:30

Fiji	9–0	Samoa
Blake 8', 61'; Pickering 16'; Fabiano 19'; Young 30'; Ah 35'; Dutta 41', 47'; Nautu 43'	Report

Umpires:
Lucy Townend (NZL)
Aleisha Neumann (AUS)

8 December 2014
16:30

Papua New Guinea	3–2	Vanuatu
Raurela 4'; Perry 15'; Fred 17'	Report	Kalsav 8'; Siro 67'

Umpires:
Harry Heritage (FIJ)
Ateca Fatufago (FIJ)

10 December 2014
16:30

Samoa	0–1	Vanuatu
	Report	Kalsav 68'

Umpires:
Lucy Townend (NZL)
Vincent Ulimpui (PNG)

11 December 2014
18:30

Fiji	3–1	Papua New Guinea
Browne 23'; Nautu 25'; Fabiano 53'	Report	Raurela 13'

Umpires:
Aleisha Neumann (AUS)
Morgan Leeder (AUS)
