= Field hockey at the 2003 Pan American Games – Men's tournament =

Men's field hockey at the 2003 Pan American Games
Tournament details
- Host country: Dominican Republic
- City: Santo Domingo
- Dates: 2 – 13 August 2003
- Teams: 8 (from 1 confederation)
- Venue(s): Santo Domingo Stadium

Final positions
- Champions: Argentina (7th title)
- Runner-up: Canada
- Third place: Cuba

Tournament statistics
- Matches played: 20
- Goals scored: 172 (8.6 per match)
- Top scorer(s): (Trinidad and Tobago) Kwandwane Browne (17 goals)

The men's field hockey tournament at the 2003 Pan American Games was held between 2–13 August 2003 in Santo Domingo, Dominican Republic. The tournament doubled as the qualification to the 2004 Summer Olympics to be held in Athens, Greece.

Argentina won the tournament for the seven time after defeating Canada 1–0. Cuba won the bronze medal after defeating Chile 6–2 in the third place playoff.

== Qualification ==
Event	Date	Location	Vacancies	Qualified
Host Nation	—	—	1	Dominican Republic
Defending Champion	—	—	1	Canada
2000 Men's Pan American Cup	June 22–July 2	Havana, Cuba	3	Cuba; Chile; United States
2003 South American Championship	March 16–23	Santiago, Chile	1	Argentina
2002 Central American and Caribbean Games	November 22–December 8	San Salvador, El Salvador	2	Trinidad and Tobago; Barbados
Total			8	

== Umpires ==
Below are the 11 umpires appointed by the Pan American Hockey Federation:

- Enzo Caraveta (ARG)
- Tomas Gantz (CHI)
- Donny Gobinsingh (TRI)
- Jason King (BAR)
- Felix Manuel Lora (DOM)
- Marcello Servetto (ARG)
- Gus Soteriades (USA)
- Luis Villa (CUB)
- Chris Wilson (CAN)
- Philip Schellekens (NED)
- Nathan Stagno (GIB)

== Preliminary round ==
=== Pool A ===
Pos	Team	Pld	W	D	L	GF	GA	GD	Pts	Qualification
1	Argentina	3	3	0	0	35	0	+35	9	Semi-finals
2	Chile	3	1	1	1	25	1	+24	4	Semi-finals
3	United States	3	1	1	1	23	4	+19	4	
4	Dominican Republic (H)	3	0	0	3	0	78	−78	0	

Source: PAHF
Rules for classification: 1) points; 2) goal difference; 3) goals scored; 4) head-to-head result.
(H) Hosts

2 August 2003
09:35

Chile	0–0	United States
	Report

Umpires:
Donny Gobinsingh (TRI)
Chris Wilson (CAN)

2 August 2003
15:30

Argentina	30–0	Dominican Republic
Hourquebie 1', 15'; Vila 3', 18', 29', 65'; Lombi 6', 9', 34', 40', 42', 53', 57', 66', 68'; Almada 8', 46'; Esraris 21', 60', 63', 70'; MacCormik 22'; Retegui 24', 36', 45'; Paredes 25', 50'; Cammareri 39', 51', 54'	Report

Umpires:
Philip Schellekens (NED)
Jason King (BAR)

4 August 2003
17:30

United States	0–4	Argentina
	Report	Vila 24'; Retegui 47'; Almada 60', 69'

Umpires:
Nathan Stagno (GIB)
Donny Gobinsingh (TRI)

4 August 2003
19:30

Dominican Republic	0–25	Chile
	Report	F. Montegu 1', 21', 28', 38', 48', 61', 64', 69'; Stein 2', 44', 54', 56', 60'; O'Ryan 4', 15', 40', 43'; Kuhlenthal 5', 11', 14', 35'; Vogel 50'; Casanova 55', 59', 69'

Umpires:
Luis Villa (CUB)
Chris Wilson (CAN)

6 August 2003
08:30

Argentina	1–0	Chile
Paredes 51'	Report

Umpires:
Philip Schellekens (NED)
Chris Wilson (CAN)

6 August 2003
17:30

United States	23–0	Dominican Republic
Martin 10', 33', 38', 50'; Hindy 14', 22', 39', 44', 46', 59'; Harris 16', 25', 42', 53', 57', 60', 61', 66'; Cota 18'; Nakamura 24', 34'; D. Kainth 52', 55'	Report

Umpires:
Luis Villa (CUB)
Jason King (BAR)

=== Pool B ===
Pos	Team	Pld	W	D	L	GF	GA	GD	Pts	Qualification
1	Canada	3	3	0	0	7	3	+4	9	Semi-finals
2	Cuba	3	2	0	1	12	3	+9	6	Semi-finals
3	Trinidad and Tobago	3	1	0	2	6	6	0	3	
4	Barbados	3	0	0	3	2	15	−13	0	

Source: PAHF
Rules for classification: 1) points; 2) goal difference; 3) goals scored; 4) head-to-head result.

2 August 2003
17:30

Canada	3–2	Barbados
Fernandes 24'; Kahlon 31'; Oliver 50'	Report	Parris 33'; Leggal 57'

Umpires:
Marcello Servetto (ARG)
Felix Manuel Lora (DOM)

2 August 2003
19:30

Trinidad and Tobago	2–3	Cuba
Browne 16', 51'	Report	Rodriguez 13'; Blanco 22', 37'

Umpires:
Nathan Stagno (GIB)
Gus Soteriades (USA)

4 August 2003
08:30

Canada	3–1	Trinidad and Tobago
Short 51'; Fernandes 57', 60'	Report	Whittington 30'

Umpires:
Enzo Caraveta (ARG)
Philip Schellenkens (NED)

4 August 2003
15:30

Barbados	0–9	Cuba
	Report	Blanco 7', 26', 35', 49', 50'; Rojas 27'; Lemos 36'; Perez 39'; Larrondo 52'

Umpires:
Marcello Servetoo (ARG)
Tomas Gantz (CHI)

6 August 2003
15:30

Cuba	0–1	Canada
	Report	Fernandes 67'

Umpires:
Nathan Stagno (GIB)
Marcello Servetto (ARG)

6 August 2003
19:30

Trinidad and Tobago	3–0	Barbados
Browne 16', 29', 40'	Report

Umpires:
Enzo Caraveta (ARG)
Gus Soteriades (USA)

== Fifth to eighth place classification ==
=== Bracket ===
Cross-overs
9 August
Dominican Republic	0
Trinidad and Tobago	22
9 August
United States	2
Barbados	1

Fifth place
12 August
Trinidad and Tobago	2
United States	3
Seventh place
12 August
Dominican Republic	1
Barbados	13

=== Cross-overs ===
9 August 2003
08:30

Dominican Republic	0–22	Trinidad and Tobago
	Report	Browne 6', 19', 20', 25', 33', 40', 45', 49', 51', 54'; Garcia 9', 67'; Gilkes 11', 42', 62'; Noreiga 34', 53'; Legerton 44'; Wren 56', 58'; Cowie 63', 65'

Umpires:
Tomas Gantz (CHI)
Jason King (BAR)

9 August 2003
15:00

United States	2–1	Barbados
Martin 47', 53'	Report	Murray 30'

Umpires:
Donny Gobinsingh (TRI)
Marcello Servetto (ARG)

=== Seventh and eighth place ===
12 August 2003
17:30

Dominican Republic	0–13	Barbados
	Report	Mayers 3', 58'; Trotman 6'; Murray 9', 42', 46'; Thomas 18', 31'; Owen 38'; Cumberbatch 43', 54'; Hill 53'; Webb 63'

Umpires:
Gus Soteriades (USA)
Luis Villa (CUB)

=== Fifth and sixth place ===
12 August 2003
20:00

Trinidad and Tobago	2–3 (a.e.t.)	United States
Browne 45', 67'	Report	Kainth 20'; Harris 61'; Nakamura 85'

Umpires:
Tomas Gantz (CHI)
Chris Wilson (CAN)

== First to fourth place classification ==
=== Bracket ===
Semi-finals
9 August 2003
Argentina	5
Cuba	1
9 August 2003
Canada	3
Chile	1

Gold medal match
13 August 2003
Argentina	1
Canada	0
Bronze medal match
13 August 2003
Cuba	6
Chile	2

=== Semi-finals ===
9 August 2003
08:30

Canada	3–1	Chile
Fernandes 10'; Deol 18'; Wettlaufer 20'	Report	Thiermann 53'

Umpires:
Philip Schellekens (NED)
Enzo Caraveta (ARG)

9 August 2003
20:00

Argentina	5–1	Cuba
Lombi 9', 12', 57', 59'; Cammareri 60'	Report	Sayas 53'

Umpires:
Nathan Stagno (GIB)
Gus Soteriades (USA)

=== Bronze medal match ===
13 August 2003
15:00

Cuba	6–2	Chile
Lemos 6', 55'; Blanco 15', 22', 26', 70'	Report	F. Montegú 18'; Gantz 42'

Umpires:
Marcello Servetto (ARG)
Enzo Caraveta (ARG)

=== Gold medal match ===
13 August 2003
20:00

Argentina	1–0	Canada
Paredes 39'	Report

Umpires:
Philip Schellekens (NED)
Nathan Stagno (GIB)

2003 Pan American Games winners

Argentina
Seventh title

== Final standings ==
Rank	Team
Gold medal	Argentina
Silver medal	Canada
Bronze medal	Cuba
4	Chile
5	United States
6	Trinidad and Tobago
7	Barbados
8	Dominican Republic

Qualified for the Summer Olympics

== Medalists ==
Event	Gold	Silver	Bronze
Men	Argentina	Canada	Cuba
