= Dominican Republic national field hockey team =

Dominican Republic national field hockey team may refer to:

- Dominican Republic men's national field hockey team
- Dominican Republic women's national field hockey team
