= Field hockey at the 2010 Central American and Caribbean Games =

- Venue: Yldefonso Sola Morales Stadium
- Location: Caguas, Puerto Rico
- Dates: 22–31 July
- Nations: 10

Champions
- Men: Mexico
- Women: Trinidad and Tobago

The field Hockey competition at the 2010 Central American and Caribbean Games was held in Mayagüez, Puerto Rico. The men's tournament was scheduled to be held from July 22–31, 2010, with the women's tournament finishing one day earlier, at the Parque Yldefonso Solá Morales in Caguas. The top two teams in each tournament qualified to compete at the 2011 Pan American Games in Guadalajara, Mexico.

== Medal summary ==
=== Medalists ===
Event	Gold	Silver	Bronze
Men	Mexico	Trinidad and Tobago	Barbados
Women	Trinidad and Tobago	Mexico	Barbados

=== Medal table ===
Rank	Nation	Gold	Silver	Bronze	Total
1	Mexico (MEX)	1	1	0	2
1	Trinidad and Tobago (TRI)	1	1	0	2
3	Barbados (BAR)	0	0	2	2
Totals (3 entries)		2	2	2	6

== Men's tournament ==
Men's field hockey at the 2010 Central American and Caribbean Games

Tournament details
- Host country: Puerto Rico
- City: Caguas
- Dates: 23–31 July
- Teams: 8 (from 1 confederation)
- Venue(s): Yldefonso Sola Morales Stadium

Final positions
- Champions: Mexico (1st title)
- Runner-up: Trinidad and Tobago
- Third place: Barbados

Tournament statistics
- Matches played: 20
- Goals scored: 176 (8.8 per match)

Mexico won their first gold medal by defeating Trinidad and Tobago 3–2 in the final. Barbados won the bronze medal by defeating the Netherlands Antilles 3–0. The top two teams in each tournament qualified to compete at the 2011 Guadalajara Pan American Games.

=== Preliminary round ===
==== Pool A ====
Pos	Team	Pld	W	D	L	GF	GA	GD	Pts	Qualification
1	Trinidad and Tobago	3	3	0	0	27	1	+26	9	Semi-finals
2	Barbados	3	2	0	1	17	5	+12	6	Semi-finals
3	Puerto Rico (H)	3	1	0	2	13	13	0	3	
4	Panama	3	0	0	3	0	38	−38	0	

Source: PAHF
(H) Hosts

23 July 2010
13:00

Barbados	12–0	Panama
Clarke 8'; Thomas 12', 65', 69'; Jordan 20'; Franklin 24', 29', 38', 63'; Lashley 35', 69'; Holder 58'	Report

Umpires:
Geert Huisman (AHO)
Lingam Karupusamy (MAS)

23 July 2010
17:00

Trinidad and Tobago	9–0	Puerto Rico
Quan Chan 7', 24', 42'; Legerton 38', 58', 64'; Gilkes 50'; Whittington 61'; James 69'	Report

Umpires:
Saleem Aaron (USA)
Daniel Basto Rivero (MEX)

25 July 2010
15:00

Barbados	1–3	Trinidad and Tobago
Franklin 46'	Report	Whittington 15'; Pierre 19'; Legerton 37'

Umpires:
Fernando Gomez (ARG)
Grant Hundley (USA)

25 July 2010
17:00

Puerto Rico	11–0	Panama
Rodriguez Linera 22'; Figueras Torres 34', 35', 48'; Torres Grilo 21'; Feliciano Santiago 46', 60'; Lastra Serrano 49', 56'; Colon Fernandez 62'; Romero Melendez 67'	Report

Umpires:
Daniel Gonzalez Alvizuri (PER)
Lingam Karupusamy (MAS)

27 July 2010
11:00

Trinidad and Tobago	15–0	Panama
Toussaint 7'; Legerton 9', 24', 27', 35', 54', 56'; Browne 11'; Whittington 16', 25', 63'; Pierre 17', 48'; Gilkes 29'; Quan Chan 46'	Report

Umpires:
Geert Huisman (AHO)
Brian Burrowes (BAR)

27 July 2010
17:00

Puerto Rico	2–4	Barbados
Lastra Serrano 9'; Feliciano Santiago 43'	Report	Jordan 5'; Franklin 7', 63'; Thomas 50'

Umpires:
Daniel Basto Rivero (MEX)
Maximiliano Scala (ARG)

==== Pool B ====
Pos	Team	Pld	W	D	L	GF	GA	GD	Pts	Qualification
1	Mexico	3	3	0	0	20	1	+19	9	Semi-finals
2	Netherlands Antilles	3	1	1	1	2	3	−1	4	Semi-finals
3	Dominican Republic	3	1	0	2	4	11	−7	3	
4	Jamaica	3	0	1	2	2	13	−11	1	

Source: PAHF

23 July 2010
11:00

Netherlands Antilles	0–0	Jamaica
	Report

Umpires:
Grant Hundley (USA)
Maximiliano Scala (ARG)

23 July 2010
15:00

Mexico	8–0	Dominican Republic
Moreno Quiroz 16', 44', 51'; Aguilar Montoya 26', 31', 47', 55'; Ríos Benítez 39'	Report

Umpires:
Fernando Gomez (ARG)
Brian Burrowes (BAR)

25 July 2010
11:00

Dominican Republic	4–2	Jamaica
Moncion Maleno 8'; Suero Acevedo 27', 54'; Guzman 40'	Report	Beach 20'; Smith 70+'

Umpires:
Saleem Aaron (USA)
Donny Gobinsingh (TRI)

25 July 2010
13:00

Netherlands Antilles	1–3	Mexico
Peeters 55'	Report	Aguilar Montoya 10', 50'; Galvǎn Nieves 27'

Umpires:
Maximiliano Scala (ARG)
Devin Hooper (GUY)

27 July 2010
13:00

Mexico	9–0	Jamaica
Aguilar Montoya 1', 20', 34', 47', 49', 54', 62'; Moreno Quiroz 3'; Ríos Benítez 67'	Report

Umpires:
Saleem Aaron (USA)
Devin Hooper (GUY)

27 July 2010
15:00

Dominican Republic	0–1	Netherlands Antilles
	Report	Van der Meer 41'

Umpires:
Fernando Gomez (ARG)
Lingam Karupusamy (MAS)

=== Fifth to eighth place classification ===
5–8th place semi-finals
29 July
Puerto Rico	3
Jamaica	1
29 July
Dominican Republic	8
Panama	1

Fifth place
31 July
Puerto Rico	4 (1)
Dominican Republic (p.s.)	4 (3)
Seventh place
31 July
Jamaica	13
Panama	0

==== 5–8th place semi-finals ====
29 July 2010
09:00

Puerto Rico	3–1	Jamaica
	Report

29 July 2010
11:30

Dominican Republic	8–1	Panama
	Report

==== Seventh place game ====
31 July 2010
09:00

Jamaica	13–0	Panama
	Report

==== Fifth place game ====
31 July 2010
11:30

Puerto Rico	4–4 (a.e.t.)	Dominican Republic
	Report
Penalties
	1–3

=== Medal round ===
Semi-finals
29 July
Trinidad and Tobago	5
Netherlands Antilles	0
29 July
Mexico	3
Barbados	1

Gold medal match
31 July
Trinidad and Tobago	2
Mexico	3
Bronze medal match
31 July
Netherlands Antilles	0
Barbados	3

==== Semi-finals ====
29 July 2010
14:00

Trinidad and Tobago	5–0	Netherlands Antilles
	Report

29 July 2010
16:30

Mexico	3–1	Barbados
	Report

==== Bronze medal match ====
31 July 2010
14:00

Netherlands Antilles	0–3	Barbados
	Report

==== Gold medal match ====
31 July 2010
16:30

Trinidad and Tobago	2–3	Mexico
	Report

=== Final standings ===
Pos	Team	Qualification
1	Mexico	2011 Pan American Games as hosts
2	Trinidad and Tobago	2011 Pan American Games
3	Barbados	2011 Pan American Games
4	Netherlands Antilles	
5	Dominican Republic	
6	Puerto Rico (H)	
7	Jamaica	
8	Panama	

Source: PAHF
(H) Host

== Women's tournament ==
Women's field hockey at the 2010 Central American and Caribbean Games

Tournament details
- Host country: Puerto Rico
- City: Caguas
- Dates: 22–30 July
- Teams: 8 (from 1 confederation)
- Venue(s): Yldefonso Sola Morales Stadium

Final positions
- Champions: Trinidad and Tobago (3rd title)
- Runner-up: Mexico
- Third place: Barbados

Tournament statistics
- Matches played: 20
- Goals scored: 57 (2.85 per match)

Trinidad and Tobago won their third gold medal by defeating Mexico 4–0 in the final. Barbados won the bronze medal by defeating the Dominican Republic 3–1. The top two teams in each tournament qualified to compete at the 2011 Guadalajara Pan American Games.

=== Preliminary round ===
==== Pool A ====
Pos	Team	Pld	W	D	L	GF	GA	GD	Pts	Qualification
1	Trinidad and Tobago	3	3	0	0	12	1	+11	9	Semi-finals
2	Barbados	3	1	1	1	2	4	−2	4	Semi-finals
3	Guyana	3	0	2	1	2	6	−4	2	
4	Bermuda	3	0	1	2	0	5	−5	1	

Source: PAHF

22 July 2010

Trinidad and Tobago	3 – 0	Barbados

22 July 2010

Bermuda	0 – 0	Guyana

24 July 2010

Bermuda	0 – 4	Trinidad and Tobago

24 July 2010

Barbados	1 – 1	Guyana

26 July 2010

Trinidad and Tobago	5 – 1	Guyana

26 July 2010

Barbados	1 – 0	Bermuda

==== Pool B ====
Pos	Team	Pld	W	D	L	GF	GA	GD	Pts	Qualification
1	Mexico	3	3	0	0	11	0	+11	9	Semi-finals
2	Dominican Republic	3	2	0	1	4	7	−3	6	Semi-finals
3	Jamaica	3	1	0	2	3	4	−1	3	
4	Puerto Rico (H)	3	0	0	3	2	9	−7	0	

Source: PAHF
(H) Hosts

22 July 2010

Mexico	6 – 0	Dominican Republic

22 July 2010

Jamaica	3 – 1	Puerto Rico

24 July 2010

Jamaica	0 – 2	Mexico

24 July 2010

Dominican Republic	3 – 1	Puerto Rico

26 July 2010

Dominican Republic	1 – 0	Jamaica

26 July 2010

Mexico	3 – 0	Puerto Rico

=== Fifth to eighth place classification ===
5–8th place semi-finals
28 July
Guyana	1
Puerto Rico	0
28 July
Jamaica	1
Bermuda	0

Fifth place
30 July
Guyana	0
Jamaica	1
Seventh place
30 July
Puerto Rico	1
Bermuda	0

=== Medal round ===
Semi-finals
28 July
Trinidad and Tobago	6
Dominican Republic	1
28 July
Mexico	2
Barbados	0

Gold medal match
30 July
Trinidad and Tobago	4
Mexico	0
Bronze medal match
30 July
Dominican Republic	1
Barbados	3

=== Final standings ===
Pos	Team	Qualification
1	Trinidad and Tobago	2011 Pan American Games
2	Mexico	2011 Pan American Games as hosts
3	Barbados	2011 Pan American Games
4	Dominican Republic	
5	Jamaica	
6	Guyana	
7	Puerto Rico (H)	
8	Bermuda	

Source: PAHF
(H) Host
