= Venezuela men's national field hockey team =

Venezuela
- Association: Venezuelan Field Hockey Federation (Federación Venezolana de Hockey sobre Cesped)
- Confederation: PAHF (Americas)

FIH ranking
- Current: 41 (4 October 2026)
- Highest: 35 (2003)
- Lowest: 65 (March – July 2015)

Pan American Games
- Appearances: 2 (first in 1983)
- Best result: 8th (1983, 1991

Pan American Cup
- Appearances: 3 (first in 2000)
- Best result: 8th (2017)
Medal record
Central American and Caribbean Games
Silver medal – second place	1990 Mexico City	Team
South American Games
Bronze medal – third place	2014 Santiago	Team
South American Championship
Silver medal – second place	2016 Chiclayo
Bolivarian Games
Gold medal – first place	2013 Chiclayo	Team

The Venezuela men's national field hockey team represents Venezuela in men's international field hockey competitions. The team is controlled by the Venezuelan Field Hockey Federation, the governing body for field hockey in Venezuela.

== Tournament record ==
=== Pan American Games ===
- 1983 – 8th place
- 1991 – 8th place

=== Pan American Cup ===
- 2000 – 10th place
- 2004 – 11th place
- 2017 – 8th place

=== Central American and Caribbean Games ===
- 1990 – (silver)
- 1994 – 6th place
- 1998 – 7th place
- 2002 – 4th place
- 2006 – 6th place
- 2026 – 4th place

=== South American Games ===
- 2014 – (bronze)
- 2018 – 4th place

=== South American Championship ===
- 2008 – 6th place
- 2010 – 5th place
- 2016 – (silver)

=== Pan American Challenge ===
- 2015 – (silver)
- 2021 – Withdrew

=== Hockey World League ===
- 2012–13 – Round 1
- 2016–17 – Round 1

=== FIH Hockey Series ===
- 2018–19 – First round

=== Bolivarian Games ===
- 2013 – (gold)

=== Alba Games ===
- 2007 – 6th place

== Results and fixtures ==
The following is a list of match results in the last 12 months, as well as any future matches that have been scheduled.

Win Draw Loss Fixture

=== 2026 ===
==== 2026 CAC Games ====
27 July 2026 Pool B	Venezuela	0–0	Dominican Republic	Santo Domingo, Dominican Republic
16:00		Report		Stadium: Parque del Este Hockey Stadium

29 July 2026 Pool B	Cuba	4–0	Venezuela	Santo Domingo, Dominican Republic
14:00	Calderón 5', 23'; Neninger 31', 38'	Report		Stadium: Parque del Este Hockey Stadium

31 July 2026 Pool B	Venezuela	5–0	Jamaica	Santo Domingo, Dominican Republic
12:00	Alvarez 12'; Simanca 17'; Adrian 38', 51'; Velasquez 44'	Report		Stadium: Parque del Este Hockey Stadium

2 August 2026 Semi final	Trinidad and Tobago	2–1	Venezuela	Santo Domingo, Dominican Republic
12:30	Marcano 3', 18'	Report	Adrian 13'	Stadium: Parque del Este Hockey Stadium

4 August 2026 Bronze medal match	Venezuela	1–5	Mexico	Santo Domingo, Dominican Republic
12:30	Andrian 9'	Report	Guzman 5'; Sosa 32'; Sandoval 49', 50'; Gomez 55'	Stadium: Parque del Este Hockey Stadium

== See also ==
- Venezuela women's national field hockey team
