= Field hockey at the 2023 Central American and Caribbean Games =

- Venue: Estadio de Hockey del Parque del Este
- Location: (Dominican Republic) Santo Domingo Este
- Dates: 23 June – 8 July

Champions
- Men: Mexico
- Women: Mexico

Field hockey at the 2023 Central American and Caribbean Games was held from 23 June to 8 July 2023 at Estadio de Hockey del Parque del Este in Santo Domingo Este, Dominican Republic. Due to infrastructure and calendar issues, the field hockey event was relocated from San Salvador, El Salvador to Santo Domingo Este in the Dominican Republic.

The top two teams in each tournament qualified for the 2023 Pan American Games. Cuba and Mexico qualified for the women's teams.

== Qualification ==
The host country, the top five teams from the previous edition of the Central American and Caribbean Games and the top two teams from the qualifying competition qualified for the 2023 edition.

=== Men's qualification ===
Dates	Event	Location	Quotas	Qualifier(s)
—N/a	Host country	—N/a	1	Dominican Republic
21–30 July 2018	2018 Central American and Caribbean Games	Barranquilla, Colombia	5	Barbados; Cuba; Guyana; Mexico; Trinidad and Tobago
13–17 July 2022	2022 CAC Games Qualifier	Hamilton, Bermuda	1	Jamaica; ~~Puerto Rico~~
—N/a	Reallocation	—N/a	1	El Salvador
Total			8	

=== Women's qualification ===
Dates	Event	Location	Quotas	Qualifier(s)
—N/a	Host country	—N/a	1	Dominican Republic
20–28 July 2018	2018 Central American and Caribbean Games	Barranquilla, Colombia	4	Barbados; Cuba; Mexico; Trinidad and Tobago
14–17 July 2022	2022 CAC Games Qualifier	Hamilton, Bermuda	3	Bermuda; Jamaica; Puerto Rico
Total			8	

== Medal summary ==
=== Medal table ===
* Host nation (Dominican Republic)

Rank	Nation	Gold	Silver	Bronze	Total
1	Mexico (MEX)	2	0	0	2
2	Cuba (CUB)	0	1	1	2
3	Trinidad and Tobago (TTO)	0	1	0	1
4	Barbados (BAR)	0	0	1	1
Totals (4 entries)		2	2	2	6

=== Medalists ===
Event	Gold	Silver	Bronze
Men's tournament	Mexico (MEX); Alexander Sandoval; Juan Sosa; Erick Hernandez; Jorge Estrada; Miguel Leon; Luis Villegas; Andre Benedith; Guillermo Gonzalez; Kevin Amador; Daniel Castillo; Alberto Rangel; Jorge Gomez; Matias Guzman; Pablo Munoz; Oscar Copado; Luis Ortiz	Trinidad and Tobago (TTO); Teague Marcano; Ethan Reynos; Akim Toussaint; Andrey Rocke; Shaquille Daniel; Mickell Pierre; Dylan Francis; Aidan De Gannes; Lyndell Byer; Caleb Guiseppi; Joel Daniel; Tariq Marcano; Jovan Wren; Jordan Vieira; Nicholas Grant; Jordan Reynos	Cuba (CUB); Yasmany Gutierrez; Freddy Duany; Liodisbel Cervante; Moise Torres; Pedro Viera; Carlos Consuegra; Dairon Luis; Denis Rodriguez; Richard Somonte; Marcos Martinez; Jeanny Vera; Felix Mena; Geovanny Neninger; Iraidys Calderon; Ignacio Aroche; Darian Valero
Women's tournament	Mexico (MEX); Jesus Castillo; Katerine Rivera; Arlette Estrada; Naomi Cardiel; Itzel Garcia; Maribel Acosta; Grecia Mendoza; Dafne Gutierrez; Valeria Espinoza; Sofia Perez; Cindy Correa; Dariana Cardiel; Dayana Cuevas; Maria Perez; Fernanda Oviedo; Mitzi Aguilera	Cuba (CUB); Alexyane Ramirez; Geidy Morales; Cheila Darias; Yunia Milanes; Tahimi Licea; Yakira Guillen; Helec Carta; Marbelis Torres; Jennifer Martinez; Arlettis Tirse; Meily Cost; Suramis Cordero; Yurismakis Garcia; Yuraima Vera; Sunaylis Nikle; Lismary Gonzalez	Barbados (BAR); Ayanna Wilson; Reiann Stoute; Camille Pounder; D'jamila Edwards; Kristina Hinds; Nakira Downes; Aliyah Griffith; Iana Strickland; Tiffany Browne; Kenya Alleyne; Sterre De Koning; Anya Alleyne-Germain; Prescod Jada; Nakisha Downes; Takirsha Cambridge; Katrina Downes

== Men's tournament ==

Tournament details
- Host country: Dominican Republic
- City: Santo Domingo
- Dates: 28 June – 6 July
- Teams: 8 (from 1 confederation)
- Venue: Estadio del Parque del Este

Final positions
- Champions: Mexico (2nd title)
- Runner-up: Trinidad and Tobago
- Third place: Cuba

Tournament statistics
- Matches played: 20
- Goals scored: 131 (6.55 per match)
- Top scorer: (Trinidad and Tobago) Teague Marcano (11 goals)

Mexico won their second title by defeating Trinidad and Tobago 5–1 in the final. The defending champions Cuba won the bronze medal by defeating Barbados 4–2.

=== Preliminary round ===
==== Pool A ====
Pos	Team	Pld	W	D	L	GF	GA	GD	Pts	Qualification
1	Barbados	3	3	0	0	19	2	+17	9	Semi-finals
2	Mexico	3	2	0	1	14	1	+13	6	Semi-finals
3	Jamaica	3	1	0	2	5	7	−2	3	
4	El Salvador	3	0	0	3	0	28	−28	0	

Source: FIH
Rules for classification: 1) points; 2) matches won; 3) goal difference; 4) goals for; 5) head-to-head result; 6) field goals for.

28 June 2023
10:00

Mexico	3–0	Jamaica
Muñoz 14'; Gomez 15'; Amador 45'	Report

Umpires:
Megan Robertson (CAN)
Kevin George (TTO)

28 June 2023
12:00

Barbados	14–0	El Salvador
Rudder 6', 20', 22', 41'; Holder 14', 54'; Roach 23', 45'; Gibson 26', 37'; Catlin 35', 60'; Warner 40'; Franklin 56'	Report

Umpires:
Reinier Diaz (CUB)
Adrian Cross (JAM)

30 June 2023
14:00

Jamaica	3–0	El Salvador
Vernon 21'; Graham 40'; Gordon 60'	Report

Umpires:
Nathaniel Fuentes (PAN)
Shane Lewis (BAR)

30 June 2023
16:00

Barbados	1–0	Mexico
Catlin 39'	Report

Umpires:
Kevin George (TTO)
Reinier Diaz (CUB)

2 July 2023
10:00

Mexico	11–0	El Salvador
Castillo 5'; Villegas 7', 43'; Gomez 9'; Estrada 26', 30'; Leon 22'; Sandoval 36', 55'; Hernández 38', 60'	Report

2 July 2023
14:00

Jamaica	2–4	Barbados
McCarthy 8'; Gordon 59'	Report	Catlin 6'; Wharton 26'; Gibson 28'; Holder 56'

Umpires:
Ayanna McClean (TTO)
Macarena Dieni (ARG)

==== Pool B ====
Pos	Team	Pld	W	D	L	GF	GA	GD	Pts	Qualification
1	Cuba	3	3	0	0	15	7	+8	9	Semi-finals
2	Trinidad and Tobago	3	2	0	1	16	7	+9	6	Semi-finals
3	Dominican Republic (H)	3	1	0	2	4	15	−11	3	
4	Guyana	3	0	0	3	6	12	−6	0	

Source: FIH
Rules for classification: 1) points; 2) matches won; 3) goal difference; 4) goals for; 5) head-to-head result; 6) field goals for.
(H) Hosts

28 June 2023
14:00

Trinidad and Tobago	4–1	Guyana
Te. Marcano 16', 29', 32', 42'; Wren 20'	Report	Stewart 37'

Umpires:
Maximilliano Scala (ARG)
Nathaniel Fuentes (PAN)

28 June 2023
16:00

Cuba	4–1	Dominican Republic
Calderon 21', 22'; Neninger 26'; Consuegra 42'	Report	Quezada 37'

Umpires:
Shane Lewis (BAR)
Andrey Umana (CRC)

30 June 2023
10:00

Guyana	2–3	Dominican Republic
France 18'; Assanah 27'	Report	Cabrera 23'; Mora 29'; Lopez 33'

Umpires:
Ayanna McClean (TTO)
Andrey Umana (CRC)

30 June 2023
12:00

Cuba	6–3	Trinidad and Tobago
Martinez 2'; Calderon 8', 15', 45'; Consuegra 14'; Cervante 26'	Report	Francis 18'; Ta. Marcano 59'; Te. Marcano 60'

Umpires:
Maximilliano Scala (ARG)
Megan Robertson (CAN)

2 July 2023
12:00

Trinidad and Tobago	9–0	Dominican Republic
Te. Marcano 16', 45', 55'; Pierre 27'; Daniel 38', 50'; Ta. Marcano 57'; Toussaint 59'	Report

Umpires:
Reinier Diaz (CUB)
Andrey Umana (CRC)

2 July 2023
16:00

Guyana	3–5	Cuba
Assanah 10'; Moore 14'; Stewart 40'	Report	Consuegra 3', 28', 29'; Duanny 22'; Calderon 24'

Umpires:
Kevin George (TTO)
Nathaniel Fuentes (PAN)

=== Fifth to eighth place classification ===
==== Bracket ====
Cross-overs
4 July
Jamaica	4
Guyana	3
4 July
El Salvador	0
Dominican Republic	4

Fifth place
6 July
Jamaica	1
Dominican Republic	3
Seventh place
6 July
Guyana	7
El Salvador	0

==== Cross-overs ====
4 July 2023
08:00

Jamaica	4–3	Guyana
Reid 13', 40', 46'; Gordon 21'	Report	Stewart 9'; France 53'; Sargeant 56'

Umpires:
Megan Robertson (CAN)
Andrey Umana (CRC)

4 July 2023
10:15

El Salvador	0–4	Dominican Republic
	Report	Moncion 35'; Dominguez 46'; Lopez 55'; Medina 60'

Umpires:
Ayanna McClean (TTO)
Diana Fuentes Castelo (MEX)

==== Seventh and eighth place ====
6 July 2023
08:00

Guyana	7–0	El Salvador
France 9'; Fausette 14'; Moore 17', 29'; Sargeant 18', 28'; Savory 23'	Report

Umpires:
Adrian Cross (JAM)
Nathaniel Fuentes (PAN)

==== Fifth and sixth place ====
6 July 2023
10:15

Jamaica	1–3	Dominican Republic
Clarke 57'	Report	Lopez 6', 41'; Emiliano 27'

Umpires:
Andrey Umana (CRC)
Reinier Diaz (CUB)

=== First to fourth place classification ===
==== Bracket ====
Semi-finals
5 July
Barbados	2
Trinidad and Tobago	8
4 July
Mexico	5
Cuba	3

Final
6 July
Trinidad and Tobago	1
Mexico	5
Third place
6 July
Barbados	2
Cuba	4

==== Semi-finals ====
5 July 2023
08:00

Barbados	2–8	Trinidad and Tobago
Warner 43'; Godding 52'	Report	Ta. Marcano 7', 46'; Vieira 22', 40'; Daniel 25'; Te. Marcano 33', 49', 59'

Umpires:
Maximilliano Scala (ARG)
Reinier Diaz (CUB)

4 July 2023
14:45

Mexico	5–3	Cuba
Sandoval 20'; Castillo 21', 37', 58', 60'	Report	Calderon 5'; Consuegra 29'; Valero 54'

Umpires:
Kevin George (TTO)
Shane Lewis (BAR)

==== Third and fourth place ====
6 July 2023
12:30

Barbados	2–4	Cuba
Warner 40'; Rudder 58'	Report	Vera 12'; Consuegra 36', 44'; Calderon 58'

Umpires:
Kevin George (TTO)
Ayanna McClean (TTO)

==== Final ====
6 July 2023
14:45

Trinidad and Tobago	1–5	Mexico
Toussaint 55'	Report	Hernández 29'; Benedith 36'; Villegas 39'; Sandoval 45', 58'

Umpires:
Maximilliano Scala (ARG)
Shane Lewis (BAR)

=== Final standings ===
Pos	Team	Qualification
1	Mexico	2023 Pan American Games
2	Trinidad and Tobago	2023 Pan American Games
3	Cuba	
4	Barbados	
5	Dominican Republic (H)	
6	Jamaica	
7	Guyana	
8	El Salvador	

Source: FIH
(H) Host

== Women's tournament ==

Tournament details
- Host country: Dominican Republic
- City: Santo Domingo
- Dates: 27 June – 5 July
- Teams: 8 (from 1 confederation)
- Venue: Estadio del Parque del Este

Final positions
- Champions: Mexico (1st title)
- Runner-up: Cuba
- Third place: Barbados

Tournament statistics
- Matches played: 20
- Goals scored: 78 (3.9 per match)
- Top scorer(s): (Cuba) Cheila Darias (Cuba) Yunia Milanes (6 goals)

Mexico won their first gold medal in women's field hockey at the Central American and Caribbean Games by defeating the defending champions Cuba 3–2 in a shoot-out after the match finished 1–1. Barbados won the bronze medal by defeating the hosts the Dominican Republic 4–2 in a shoot-out after the match finished 2–2.

=== Preliminary round ===
==== Pool A ====
Pos	Team	Pld	W	D	L	GF	GA	GD	Pts	Qualification
1	Cuba	3	2	1	0	12	3	+9	7	Semi-finals
2	Mexico	3	2	1	0	10	3	+7	7	Semi-finals
3	Trinidad and Tobago	3	1	0	2	6	7	−1	3	
4	Jamaica	3	0	0	3	0	15	−15	0	

Source: FIH
Rules for classification: 1) points; 2) matches won; 3) goal difference; 4) goals for; 5) head-to-head result; 6) field goals for.

27 June 2023
10:00

Mexico	2–2	Cuba
Cuevas 34'; S. Pérez 59'	Report	Milanes 15+'; Darias 46'

Umpires:
Macarena Dieni (ARG)
Shane Lewis (BAR)

27 June 2023
12:00

Trinidad and Tobago	4–0	Jamaica
King 3', 40'; Sh. de Freitas 13'; Saa. Olton 38'	Report

Umpires:
Megan Robertson (CAN)
Diana Borrayo (GUY)

29 June 2023
14:00

Cuba	6–0	Jamaica
Darias 2'; Milanes 20', 32', 41'; Vera 48'; Martinez 52'	Report

Umpires:
Ayanna McClean (TTO)
Diana Fuentes Castelo (MEX)

29 June 2023
16:00

Trinidad and Tobago	1–3	Mexico
Dey 58'	Report	Pérez 10'; Estrada 38'; Acosta 51'

Umpires:
Megan Robertson (CAN)
Richanne Gaskin (BAR)

1 July 2023
10:00

Mexico	5–0	Jamaica
Estrada 4'; Pérez 17'; Rivera 26'; Cuevas 29'; Mendoza 33'	Report

Umpires:
Richanne Gaskin (BAR)
Kevin George (TTO)

1 July 2023
14:00

Cuba	4–1	Trinidad and Tobago
Darias 15', 19'; Martinez 34'; Carta 55'	Report	Henry 60'

Umpires:
Macarena Dieni (ARG)
Shane Lewis (BAR)

==== Pool B ====
Pos	Team	Pld	W	D	L	GF	GA	GD	Pts	Qualification
1	Dominican Republic (H)	3	2	1	0	9	4	+5	7	Semi-finals
2	Barbados	3	1	2	0	9	4	+5	5	Semi-finals
3	Bermuda	3	1	0	2	7	8	−1	3	
4	Puerto Rico	2	0	1	1	2	7	−5	1	

Source: FIH
Rules for classification: 1) points; 2) matches won; 3) goal difference; 4) goals for; 5) head-to-head result; 6) field goals for.
(H) Hosts

27 June 2023
14:00

Barbados	3–2	Bermuda
Nakir. Downes 3', 34'; Wilson 52'	Report	Chisnall 4'; Osborne 60'

Umpires:
Diana Fuentes Castelo (MEX)
Jennifer Rojas (CRC)

27 June 2023
16:00

Puerto Rico	1–2	Dominican Republic
Morales 9'	Report	Oflaherti 49'; Williams 55'

Umpires:
Ayanna McClean (TTO)
Richanne Gaskin (BAR)

29 June 2023
10:00

Bermuda	1–5	Dominican Republic
Towlson 45'	Report	Marte 6'; Williams 26', 37'; Oflaherti 36', 41'

Umpires:
Jennifer Rojas (CRC)
Maximiliano Scala (ARG)

29 June 2023
12:00

Puerto Rico	1–1	Barbados
Pianetti 45'	Report	Wilson 57'

Umpires:
Macarena Dieni (ARG)
Diana Borrayo (GUY)

1 July 2023
12:00

Barbados	2–2	Dominican Republic
Nakir. Downes 5', 38'	Report	Oflaherti 21'; Agustina Birocho 35'

Umpires:
Diana Fuentes Castelo (MEX)
Reinier Diaz (CUB)

1 July 2023
16:00

Bermuda	4–0	Puerto Rico
Osborne 29'; Clarke 44'; Harris 47'; De Silva 51'	Report

Umpires:
Diana Borrayo (GUA)
Adrian Cross (JAM)

=== Fifth to eighth place classification ===
==== Bracket ====
Cross-overs
3 July
Trinidad and Tobago	2
Puerto Rico	0
3 July
Jamaica (p.s.o.)	0 (2)
Bermuda	0 (0)

Fifth place
5 July
Trinidad and Tobago	1 (1)
Jamaica (p.s.o.)	1 (2)
Seventh place
5 July
Puerto Rico	4
Bermuda	2

==== Cross-overs ====
3 July 2023
08:00

Trinidad and Tobago	2–0	Puerto Rico
Sam. Olton 8', 20'	Report

Umpires:
Maximilliano Scala (ARG)
Diana Borrayo (GUA)

3 July 2023
10:15

Jamaica	0–0	Bermuda
	Report
Penalties
Nicholson (penalty shoot-out scored); Griffiths (penalty shoot-out missed); James (penalty shoot-out missed); Witter (penalty shoot-out scored)	2–0	(penalty shoot-out missed) Hollis; (penalty shoot-out missed) Hollis; (penalty shoot-out missed) Troake; (penalty shoot-out missed) Cardwell

Umpires:
Richanne Gaskin (BAR)
Reinier Diaz (CUB)

==== Seventh and eighth place ====
5 July 2023
16:00

Puerto Rico	4–2	Bermuda
Morales 13'; Oyola 18'; Pianetti 25'; Harris 27'	Report	Osborne 10'; Norton 31'

Umpires:
Diana Borrayo (GUA)
Nathaniel Fuentes (PAN)

==== Fifth and sixth place ====
5 July 2023
10:00

Trinidad and Tobago	1–1	Jamaica
Olton 44'	Report	Tullonge 9'
Penalties
Sh. de Freitas (penalty shoot-out missed); Sa. de Freitas (penalty shoot-out missed); Henry (penalty shoot-out scored); King (penalty shoot-out missed); Sh. de Freitas (penalty shoot-out missed)	1–2	(penalty shoot-out scored) Nicholson; (penalty shoot-out missed) Linton; (penalty shoot-out scored) Griffiths; (penalty shoot-out missed) Witter

Umpires:
Richanne Gaskin (BAR)
Andrey Umana (CRC)

=== First to fourth place classification ===
==== Bracket ====
Semi-finals
3 July
Cuba	8
Barbados	1
3 July
Mexico	1
Dominican Republic	0

Final
5 July
Cuba	1 (2)
Mexico (p.s.o.)	1 (3)
Third place
5 July
Barbados (p.s.o.)	2 (4)
Dominican Republic	2 (2)

==== Semi-finals ====
3 July 2023
12:30

Cuba	8–1	Barbados
Darias 2', 38'; Milanes 16', 40'; Martinez 20', 41'; Morales 33'; Vera 50'	Report	Edwards 15'

Umpires:
Macarena Dieni (ARG)
Diana Fuentes Castelo (MEX)

3 July 2023
14:45

Mexico	1–0	Dominican Republic
Correa 35'	Report

Umpires:
Ayanna McClean (TTO)
Megan Robertson (CAN)

==== Third and fourth place ====
5 July 2023
12:00

Barbados	2–2	Dominican Republic
Edwards 60'; Wilson 60+'	Report	Oflaherti 10'; Williams 48'
Penalties
Downes (penalty shoot-out scored); Wilson (penalty shoot-out scored) de Koning (penalty shoot-out scored); Downs (penalty shoot-out scored)	4–2	(penalty shoot-out missed) Oflaherti; (penalty shoot-out scored) Navamuel; (penalty shoot-out scored) Disanti; (penalty shoot-out missed) Leon

Umpires:
Macarena Dieni (ARG)
Diana Fuentes Castelo (MEX)

==== Final ====
5 July 2023
14:00

Cuba	1–1	Mexico
Nikle 34'	Report	Pérez 57'
Penalties
Milanes (penalty shoot-out scored); Vera (penalty shoot-out missed); Carta (penalty shoot-out missed); Martinez (penalty shoot-out scored); Nikle (penalty shoot-out missed)	2–3	(penalty shoot-out scored) Mendoza; (penalty shoot-out missed) Estrada; (penalty shoot-out scored) Oviedo; (penalty shoot-out missed) Cuevas; (penalty shoot-out scored) Rivera

Umpires:
Ayanna McClean (TTO)
Megan Robertson (CAN)

=== Final standings ===
Pos	Team	Qualification
1	Mexico	2023 Pan American Games
2	Cuba	2023 Pan American Games
3	Barbados	
4	Dominican Republic (H)	
5	Jamaica	
6	Trinidad and Tobago	
7	Puerto Rico	
8	Bermuda	

Source: FIH
(H) Host
