= Field hockey at the 2026 Central American and Caribbean Games =

- Venue: Parque del Este Hockey Stadium
- Location: (Dominican Republic) Santo Domingo Este
- Dates: 26 July – 4 August

Champions
- Men: Cuba
- Women: Cuba

Field hockey at the 2026 Central American and Caribbean Games was held from 26 July to 4 August 2026 at Parque del Este Hockey Stadium in Santo Domingo Este, Dominican Republic.

The top two teams in each tournament qualified for the 2027 Pan American games in Lima, Peru.

== Venue ==
(Dominican Republic) Santo Domingo Este
Parque del Este Hockey Stadium
Capacity: 200

== Qualification ==
The host country, the top five teams from the previous edition of the Central American and Caribbean Games and the top two teams from the qualifying competition qualified for the 2026 edition.

=== Men's qualification ===
Dates	Event	Location	Quotas	Qualifier(s)
—N/a	Host country	—N/a	1	Dominican Republic
23 June – 8 July 2023	2023 Central American and Caribbean Games	Santo Domingo Este, Dominican Republic	5	Mexico; Trinidad and Tobago; Cuba; Barbados; Jamaica
3–11 May 2025	2026 CAC Games Qualifier	Guanajuato, Mexico	2	Venezuela; Guatemala
Total			8	

=== Women's qualification ===
Dates	Event	Location	Quotas	Qualifier(s)
—N/a	Host country	—N/a	1	Dominican Republic
27 June – 5 July 2023	2023 Central American and Caribbean Games	Santo Domingo Este, Dominican Republic	5	Mexico; Cuba; Barbados; Jamaica; Puerto Rico
3–11 May 2025	2026 CAC Games Qualifier	Guanajuato, Mexico	2	Venezuela; Bermuda
Total			8	

== Medal table ==
* Host nation (Dominican Republic)

Rank	Nation	Gold	Silver	Bronze	Total
1	Cuba (CUB)	2	0	0	2
2	Mexico (MEX)	0	1	1	2
3	Trinidad and Tobago (TTO)	0	1	0	1
4	Venezuela (VEN)	0	0	1	1
Totals (4 entries)		2	2	2	6

== Medal summary ==
Event	Gold	Silver	Bronze
Men's tournament	Cuba; Ignacio Aroche; Denis Rodríguez; Liodisbel Cervante; Geovanny Neninger; Víctor Nazco; Pedro Viera; Félix Mena; Iraidys Calderón; Yoandy Blanco; Kevin Mestre; Michael Batista; Marlon Sánchez; Richard Somonte; Alejandro Echevarría; Dairon Louis	Trinidad and Tobago; Malcolm Baptiste; Joel Daniel; Jabari Perez; Dylan Francis; Rene Mohammed; Teague Marcano; Tarell Singh; Nicholas Siu; Nicholas Whiteman; Mickell Pierre; Shaquille Daniel; Jordan Reynos; Caleb Guiseppi; Ethan Reynos; Tariq Singh; Sheldon De Lisle	Mexico; Alberto Rangel; Pablo Muñoz; Luis Ortiz; Daniel Castillo; Matías Guzmán; André Benedith; Alexander Sandoval; Kevin Amador; Santiago Camacho; Juan Medina; Edgar Espinoza; Luis Villegas; Jorge Gómez; Juan Sosa; Jorge Estrada; Ángel González
Women's tournament	Cuba; Yurismailis García; Amanda Serrano; Tahimi Licea; Sunaylis Nikle; Yadira Puente; Eliudilay Figueroa; Suramis Cordero; Arlettis Tirse; Alexyane Ramírez; Cheila Darias; Yulitza Martínez; Yolaini Tamayo; Yuraima Vera; Alina Palacio; Diana Lores; Aglays Serrano	Mexico; Jesús Castillo; Maribel Acosta; Mayra Lacheño; Dariana Cardiel; Mitzi Aguilera; Dayana Cuevas; Katerine Rivera; Naomi Cardiel; Valeria Espinoza; Mariana Agraz; Arlette Estrada; Fernanda Oviedo; Alejandra García; Grecia Mendoza; Sofía Pérez; Itzel García	Venezuela; Deilymar González; Yamileth Pargas; Mariannys González; Victoria Torres; Luismar Báez; Zaidymar Montero; Patricia Mujica; Johandri Sánchez; Yurami Navas; María Artigas; Mery Rodríguez; Maholy Hernández; Stephanie González; Marioska Peralta; Carla Beltrán; Jessica Meléndez

== Men's tournament ==
Tournament details
- Host country: Dominican Republic
- City: Santo Domingo Este
- Dates: 26 July – 4 August
- Teams: 8 (from 1 confederation)
- Venue: Estadio del Parque del Este

Final positions
- Champions: Cuba (9th title)
- Runner-up: Trinidad and Tobago
- Third place: Mexico

Tournament statistics
- Matches played: 20
- Goals scored: 93 (4.65 per match)
- Top scorer(s): (Cuba) Iraidys Calderón (Trinidad and Tobago) Teague Marcano (8 goals)

The winners Cuba and the runners-up Trinidad and Tobago secured their places in the 2027 Pan American games.

=== Preliminary round ===
All times are local (UTC–4)

==== Pool A ====
Pos	Team	Pld	W	D	L	GF	GA	GD	Pts	Qualification
1	Trinidad and Tobago	3	3	0	0	20	1	+19	9	Semi-finals
2	Mexico	3	2	0	1	9	5	+4	6	Semi-finals
3	Barbados	3	1	0	2	4	10	−6	3	
4	Guatemala	3	0	0	3	2	19	−17	0	

Source: FIH
Rules for classification: 1) points; 2) matches won; 3) goal difference; 4) goals for; 5) head-to-head result; 6) field goals for.

27 July 2026
10:00

Mexico	1–5	Trinidad and Tobago
Sosa 44'	Report	Marcano 5', 14', 26'; Daniel 38'; Reynos 50'

Umpires:
Yeung Ming Chor (HKG)
Andrey Umana (CRC)

27 July 2026
12:00

Guatemala	2–4	Barbados
Mendez 28'; Calderón 39'	Report	Wharton 7', 28'; Gibson 56'; Springer 57'

Umpires:
Manuel Sierra Centeno (VEN)
Adrian Cross (JAM)

29 July 2026
10:00

Trinidad and Tobago	5–0	Barbados
Guiseppi 12'; Reynes 15+'; Whiteman 27'; Siu Butt 34', 59'	Report

Umpires:
Joaquin Morini del Castillo (ARG)
Yeung Ming Chor (HKG)

29 July 2026
12:00

Guatemala	0–5	Mexico
	Report	Estrada 34'; Villegas 41'; Sandoval 57', 58'; Benedith 60'

Umpires:
Andrey Umana (CRC)
Manuel Sierra Centeno (VEN)

31 July 2026
10:00

Mexico	3–0	Barbados
Benedith 40'; Sosa 41'; Sandoval 48'	Report

Umpires:
Yeung Ming Chor (HKG)
Shahiela Johari (MAS)

31 July 2026
14:00

Trinidad and Tobago	10–0	Guatemala
Tariq 2'; Marcano 6', 35', 58'; Tarell 7', 15'; Daniel 14', 55'; Siu Butt 39'; Whiteman 46'	Report

Umpires:
Jonathan Altamirano (MEX)
Erika Barbera (USA)

==== Pool B ====
Pos	Team	Pld	W	D	L	GF	GA	GD	Pts	Qualification
1	Cuba	3	3	0	0	12	5	+7	9	Semi-finals
2	Venezuela	3	1	1	1	5	4	+1	4	Semi-finals
3	Dominican Republic	3	1	1	1	7	8	−1	4	
4	Jamaica	3	0	0	3	1	8	−7	0	

Source: FIH
Rules for classification: 1) points; 2) matches won; 3) goal difference; 4) goals for; 5) head-to-head result; 6) field goals for.

27 July 2026
14:00

Cuba	1–0	Jamaica
Calderón 17'	Report

Umpires:
Joaquin Morini del Castillo (ARG)
Shane Lewis (BAR)

27 July 2026
16:00

Venezuela	0–0	Dominican Republic
	Report

Umpires:
Jonathan Altamirano (MEX)
Paul Inniss (BAR)

29 July 2026
14:00

Cuba	4–0	Venezuela
Calderón 5', 23'; Neninger 31', 38'	Report

Umpires:
Shane Lewis (BAR)
Adrian Cross (JAM)

29 July 2026
16:00

Dominican Republic	2–1	Jamaica
Cabrera 26', 47'	Report	Stephenson 48'

Umpires:
Jonathan Altamirano (MEX)
Lyndell Byer (TTO)

31 July 2026
12:00

Venezuela	5–0	Jamaica
Alvarez 12'; Simanca 17'; Adrian 38', 51'; Velasquez 44'	Report

Umpires:
Shane Lewis (BAR)
Lyndell Byer (TTO)

31 July 2026
16:00

Dominican Republic	5–7	Cuba
Cabrera 9'; Anton 17'; Moncion 28', 51'; Nivar 43'	Report	Batista 2'; Viera 3'; Calderón 8', 22', 57'; Neninger 38'; Echevarría 51'

Umpires:
Joaquin Morini del Castillo (ARG)
Manuel Sierra Centeno (VEN)

=== Fifth to eighth place classification ===
==== Bracket ====
Cross-overs
2 August
Barbados	0
Jamaica	2
2 August
Dominican Republic	4
Guatemala	1

Fifth place
4 August
Jamaica	1
Dominican Republic	4
Seventh place
4 August
Barbados	3
Guatemala	0

==== Cross-overs ====
2 August 2026
08:00

Barbados	0–2	Jamaica
	Report	Stephenson 5'; Powell 45'

Umpires:
Andrey Umana (CRC)
Yeung Ming Chor (HKG)

2 August 2026
10:15

Dominican Republic	4–1	Guatemala
Cruz L 53'; Lopez 53'; Moncion 58'; Emiliano 60'	Report	González 20'

Umpires:
Paul Inniss (BAR)
Lyndell Byer (TTO)

==== Seventh and eighth place ====
4 August 2026
08:00

Barbados	3–0	Guatemala
Toppin 41'; Yarde-Deane 54'; Phillips 55'	Report

Umpires:
Andrey Umana (CRC)
Adrian Cross (JAM)

==== Fifth and sixth place ====
4 August 2026
10:15

Jamaica	1–4	Dominican Republic
Powell 43'	Report	Lopez 5'; Dominguez 22'; Quezada 37'; Cabrera 51'

Umpires:
Lyndell Byer (TTO)
Paul Inniss (BAR)

=== First to fourth place classification ===
==== Bracket ====
Semi-finals
2 August
Trinidad and Tobago	2
Venezuela	1
2 August
Cuba	3
Mexico	2

Final
4 August
Trinidad and Tobago	2 (1)
Cuba (p.s.o)	2 (2)
Third place
4 August
Venezuela	1
Mexico	5

==== Semi-finals ====
2 August 2026
12:30

Trinidad and Tobago	2–1	Venezuela
Marcano 3', 18'	Report	Adrian 13'

Umpires:
Jonathan Altamirano (MEX)
Erika Barbera (USA)

2 August 2026
14:45

Cuba	3–2	Mexico
Batista 26', 49'; Calderón 50'	Report	Gomez 8'; Sandoval 32'

Umpires:
Joaquin Morini (ARG)
Manuel Sierra Centeno (VEN)

==== Bronze medal match ====
4 August 2026
12:30

Venezuela	1–5	Mexico
Andrian 9'	Report	Guzman 5'; Sosa 32'; Sandoval 49', 50'; Gomez 55'

Umpires:
Shane Lewis (BAR)
Shahiela Johari (MAS)

==== Gold medal match ====
4 August 2026
14:45

Trinidad and Tobago	2–2	Cuba
Pierre 45'; Francis 58'	Report	Calderón 13'; Sánchez 40'
Penalties
Siu Butt (penalty shoot-out missed); Marcano (penalty shoot-out scored); Pierre (penalty shoot-out missed); J. Daniel (penalty shoot-out missed); S. Daniel (penalty shoot-out missed)	1–2	(penalty shoot-out scored) Calderón; (penalty shoot-out missed) Mena; (penalty shoot-out missed) Batista; (penalty shoot-out missed) Echevarría; (penalty shoot-out scored) Calderón

Umpires:
Manuel Sierra Centeno (VEN)
Jonathan Altamirano (MEX)

2026 Central American and Caribbean Games
Men's field hockey tournament winners

Cuba
9th title

=== Final standings ===
Pos	Team	Qualification
1st place, gold medalist(s)	Cuba	2027 Pan American Games
2nd place, silver medalist(s)	Trinidad and Tobago	2027 Pan American Games
3rd place, bronze medalist(s)	Mexico	
4	Venezuela	
5	Dominican Republic (H)	
6	Jamaica	
7	Barbados	
8	Guatemala	

Source: FIH
(H) Host

=== Goalscorers ===
There were 93 goals scored in 20 matches, for an average of 4.65 goals per match.

8 goals

- (Cuba) Iraidys Calderón
- (Trinidad and Tobago) Teague Marcano

7 goals

- (Mexico) Alexander Sandoval

4 goals

- (Dominican Republic) Argeny Cabrera
- (Venezuela) Andy Adrian

3 goals

- (Cuba) Michael Batista
- (Cuba) Geovanny Neninger
- (Dominican Republic) Jeffrey Moncion
- (Mexico) Juan Sosa
- (Trinidad and Tobago) Joel Daniel
- (Trinidad and Tobago) Nicholas Siu Butt

2 goals

- (Barbados) Kanye Wharton
- (Dominican Republic) Jose Lopez
- (Jamaica) Daniel Powell
- (Jamaica) Nickoy Stephenson
- (Mexico) Andre Benedith
- (Mexico) Jorge Gomez
- (Trinidad and Tobago) Jordan Reynos
- (Trinidad and Tobago) Tarell Singh
- (Trinidad and Tobago) Nicholas Whiteman

1 goal

- (Barbados) Khodi Gibson
- (Barbados) Taurean Phillips
- (Barbados) Ahijah Springer
- (Barbados) Dominic Toppin
- (Barbados) Raghnall Yarde-Deane
- (Cuba) Alejandro Echevarría
- (Cuba) Marlon Sánchez
- (Cuba) Pedro Viera
- (Dominican Republic) Yermi Anton
- (Dominican Republic) Hugo E Cruz L
- (Dominican Republic) Ramon Dominguez
- (Dominican Republic) Braulin Emiliano
- (Dominican Republic) Jorge Nivar
- (Dominican Republic) Bladis Quezada
- (Guatemala) Abel Calderón
- (Guatemala) Edwin González
- (Guatemala) José Mendez
- (Mexico) Jorge Estrada
- (Mexico) Luis Villegas
- (Trinidad and Tobago) Dylan Francis
- (Trinidad and Tobago) Caleb Guiseppi
- (Trinidad and Tobago) Mickell Pierre
- (Trinidad and Tobago) Tariq Singh
- (Venezuela) Nelson Alvarez
- (Venezuela) Raudin Simanca
- (Venezuela) Yanier Velasquez

Source: FIH

== Women's tournament ==
Tournament details
- Host country: Dominican Republic
- City: Santo Domingo Este
- Dates: 26 July – 4 August
- Teams: 8 (from 1 confederation)
- Venue: Estadio del Parque del Este

Final positions
- Champions: Cuba (6th title)
- Runner-up: Mexico
- Third place: Venezuela

Tournament statistics
- Matches played: 20
- Goals scored: 90 (4.5 per match)
- Top scorer: (Cuba) Yuraima Vera (8 goals)

The winners Cuba and the runners-up Mexico secured their places in the 2027 Pan American games.

=== Preliminary round ===
All times are local (UTC–4)

==== Pool A ====
Pos	Team	Pld	W	D	L	GF	GA	GD	Pts	Qualification
1	Mexico	3	3	0	0	13	4	+9	9	Semi-finals
2	Venezuela	3	2	0	1	12	10	+2	6	Semi-finals
3	Dominican Republic	3	0	1	2	5	9	−4	1	
4	Puerto Rico	3	0	1	2	3	10	−7	1	

Source: FIH
Rules for classification: 1) points; 2) matches won; 3) goal difference; 4) goals for; 5) head-to-head result; 6) field goals for.

26 July 2026
14:00

Puerto Rico	1–4	Venezuela
Vazquez 14'	Report	González 46', 58'; Mujica 49'; Rodriguez 54'

Umpires:
Alejandra Pasillas (MEX)
Angela de Silva (BER)

26 July 2026
16:00

Mexico	2–1	Dominican Republic
Lacheno 20'; Estrada 57'	Report	Birocho 13'

Umpires:
Erika Barbera (USA)
Yailyn Abrahan (CUB)

28 July 2026
14:00

Puerto Rico	1–5	Mexico
Dukes 23'	Report	Rivera 14', 27'; Lacheno 15+', 54'; Mendoza 34'

Umpires:
Yailyn Abrahan (CUB)
Shahiela Johari (MAS)

28 July 2026
16:00

Dominican Republic	3–6	Venezuela
Birocho 2'; Ortega 17'; Gonzalez 51'	Report	González 12', 58'; Sanchez 25', 55'; Navas 26', 59'

Umpires:
Marisa Miro (PUR)
Felicia King (TTO)

30 July 2026
12:00

Mexico	6–2	Venezuela
Estrada 22'; Espinoza 28', 32'; Pérez 52'; Aguilera 54'; Lacheno 56'	Report	Beltran 14'; Mujica 18'

Umpires:
Yailyn Abrahan (CUB)
Diana Borrayo (GUA)

30 July 2026
16:00

Dominican Republic	1–1	Puerto Rico
Gonzalez 52'	Report	Landis 41'

Umpires:
Alejandra Pasillas (MEX)
Felicia King (TTO)

==== Pool B ====
Pos	Team	Pld	W	D	L	GF	GA	GD	Pts	Qualification
1	Cuba	3	3	0	0	23	1	+22	9	Semi-finals
2	Barbados	3	2	0	1	7	10	−3	6	Semi-finals
3	Bermuda	3	1	0	2	3	12	−9	3	
4	Jamaica	3	0	0	3	1	11	−10	0	

Source: FIH
Rules for classification: 1) points; 2) matches won; 3) goal difference; 4) goals for; 5) head-to-head result; 6) field goals for.

26 July 2026
10:00

Cuba	7–0	Jamaica
Darias 1'; Vera 7', 53'; Tamayo 20', 45', 49'; Nikle 33'	Report

Umpires:
Shahiela Johari (MAS)
Felicia King (TTO)

26 July 2026
12:00

Barbados	3–2	Bermuda
Wilson 43', 57'; Downes 55'	Report	Stempel 10'; Davidson 14'

Umpires:
Marisa Miro (PUR)
Diana Borrayo (GUA)

28 July 2026
10:00

Jamaica	0–1	Bermuda
	Report	Smith 60'

Umpires:
Erika Barbera (USA)
Whitney Doyle (BAR)

28 July 2026
12:00

Barbados	1–7	Cuba
Downes 9'	Report	Nikle 1'; Darius 5', 49'; Vera 6', 17'; Tirse 40'; Cordero 48'

Umpires:
Alejandra Pasillas (MEX)
Diana Borrayo (GUA)

30 July 2026
10:00

Cuba	9–0	Bermuda
Tamayo 5'; Darias 9', 17'; Ramirez 13'; Martinez 18', 49'; Vera 30', 58'; Serrano 54'	Report

Umpires:
Whitney Doyle (BAR)
Shane Lewis (BAR)

30 July 2026
14:00

Jamaica	1–3	Barbados
Griffiths- Harris 60+'	Report	Prescod 48'; Edwards 51'; Wilson 58'

Umpires:
Lyndell Byer (TTO)
Angela de Silva (BER)

=== Fifth to eighth place classification ===
==== Bracket ====
Cross-overs
1 August
Dominican Republic	1
Jamaica	0
1 August
Bermuda	1 (1)
Puerto Rico (p s.o)	1 (3)

Fifth place
3 August
Dominican Republic	2
Puerto Rico	1
Seventh place
3 August
Jamaica	1
Bermuda	0

==== Cross-overs ====
1 August 2026
08:00

Dominican Republic	1–0	Jamaica
Oflaherti 43'	Report

Umpires:
Marisa Miro (PUR)
Angela de Silva (BER)

1 August 2026
10:15

Bermuda	1–1	Puerto Rico
Brewer 18'	Report	Yazzetti 11'
Penalties
de Silva (penalty shoot-out scored); Brewer (penalty shoot-out missed); Hollis (penalty shoot-out missed); Stewart (penalty shoot-out missed)	1–3	(penalty shoot-out scored) Morales; (penalty shoot-out missed) Woods; (penalty shoot-out scored) Ruiz; (penalty shoot-out scored) Aponte

Umpires:
Adrian Cross (JAM)
Paul Inniss (BAR)

==== Seventh and eighth place ====
3 August 2026
08:00

Jamaica	1–0	Bermuda
Packham 9'	Report

Umpires:
Whitney Doyle (BAR)
Alejandra Pasillas (MEX)

==== Fifth and sixth place ====
3 August 2026
10:15

Dominican Republic	2–1	Puerto Rico
Birocho 27', 51'	Report	Leon 5'

Umpires:
Diana Borrayo (GUA)
Angela de Silva (BER)

=== First to fourth place classification ===
==== Bracket ====
Semi-finals
1 August
Mexico	5
Barbados	0
1 August
Cuba	6
Venezuela	0

Final
3 August
Mexico	0 (0)
Cuba (p.s.o)	0 (2)
Third place
3 August
Barbados	1
Venezuela	4

==== Semi-finals ====
1 August 2026
12:30

Mexico	5–0	Barbados
Pérez 9', 60'; Espinoza 29'; Rivera 38', 51'	Report

Umpires:
Felicia King (TTO)
Andrey Umana (CRC)

1 August 2026
14:45

Cuba	6–0	Venezuela
Vera 9', 20'; Martinez 24'; Tamayo 37'; Darias 44', 49'	Report

Umpires:
Alejandra Pasillas (MEX)
Shahiela Johari (MAS)

==== Bronze medal match ====
3 August 2026
12:30

Barbados	1–4	Venezuela
Downes 19'	Report	Sanchez 10'; Rodriguez 11'; Artigas 14'; Mujica 49'

Umpires:
Yailyn Abrahan (CUB)
Marisa Miro (PUR)

==== Gold medal match ====
3 August 2026
14:45

Mexico	0–0	Cuba
	Report
Penalties
Mendoza (penalty shoot-out missed); Lacheno (penalty shoot-out missed); Estrada (penalty shoot-out missed); Espinoza (penalty shoot-out missed)	0–2	(penalty shoot-out scored) Licea; (penalty shoot-out missed) Ramirez; (penalty shoot-out scored) Nikle

Umpires:
Felicia King (TTO)
Erika Barbera (USA)

2026 Central American and Caribbean Games
Women's field hockey tournament winners

Cuba
6th title

=== Final standings ===
Pos	Team	Qualification
1st place, gold medalist(s)	Cuba	2027 Pan American Games
2nd place, silver medalist(s)	Mexico	2027 Pan American Games
3rd place, bronze medalist(s)	Venezuela	
4	Barbados	
5	Dominican Republic (H)	
6	Puerto Rico	
7	Jamaica	
8	Bermuda	

Source: FIH
(H) Host

=== Goalscorers ===
There were 90 goals scored in 20 matches, for an average of 4.5 goals per match.

8 goals

- (Cuba) Yuraima Vera

7 goals

- (Cuba) Cheila Darias

5 goals

- (Cuba) Yolaini Tamayo

4 goals

- (Dominican Republic) Agustina Birocho
- (Mexico) Mayra Lacheno
- (Mexico) Katerine Rivera
- (Venezuela) Mariannys González

3 goals

- (Barbados) Nakira Downes
- (Barbados) Ayanna Wilson
- (Cuba) Yulitza Martinez
- (Mexico) Valeria Espinoza
- (Mexico) Sofia Pérez
- (Venezuela) Patricia Mujica
- (Venezuela) Johandri Sanchez

2 goals

- (Cuba) Sunaylis Nikle
- (Dominican Republic) Marian Gonzalez
- (Mexico) Arlette Estrada
- (Venezuela) Yurami Navas
- (Venezuela) Mery Rodriguez

1 goal

- (Barbados) D'Jamila Edwards
- (Barbados) Jada Prescod
- (Bermuda) Abigail Brewer
- (Bermuda) Elizabeth Davidson
- (Bermuda) Chrysda Smith
- (Bermuda) Robin Stempel
- (Cuba) Suramis Cordero
- (Cuba) Alexyane Ramirez
- (Cuba) Aglays Serrano
- (Cuba) Arlettis Tirse
- (Dominican Republic) Cecilia Oflaherti
- (Dominican Republic) Magalys Ortega
- (Jamaica) Kamille Griffiths- Harris
- (Jamaica) Talia Packham
- (Mexico) Mitzi Aguilera
- (Mexico) Grecia Mendoza
- (Puerto Rico) Layla Dukes
- (Puerto Rico) Belyse Landis
- (Puerto Rico) Lyneishka Leon
- (Puerto Rico) Sheila Vazquez
- (Puerto Rico) Emily Yazzetti
- (Venezuela) Maria Artigas
- (Venezuela) Carla Beltran

Source: FIH
