= Field hockey at the 1979 Pan American Games =

- Start date: 6 July 1979
- End date: 14 July 1979
- Teams: 10

Medalists
Gold medal	Argentina (4th title)
Silver medal	Canada
Bronze medal	Mexico

The field hockey tournament at the 1979 Pan American Games was the fourth edition of the field hockey event at the Pan American Games. It took place in San Juan, Puerto Rico from 6 to 14 July 1979.

The three-time defending champions Argentina won their fourth gold medal in a row by defeating Canada 3–0 in the final. Mexico took the bronze medal by defeating Cuba 5–3 after extra time.

Event	Gold	Silver	Bronze
Men's field hockey	Argentina	Canada	Mexico

== Results ==
=== Group stage ===
==== Group A ====
Pos	Team	Pld	W	D	L	GF	GA	GD	Pts	Qualification
1	Argentina	4	4	0	0	26	2	+24	8	Semi-finals
2	Cuba	4	2	1	1	6	12	−6	5	Semi-finals
3	United States	4	2	1	1	7	9	−2	5	5–8th place semi-finals
4	Jamaica	4	0	1	3	3	9	−6	1	5–8th place semi-finals
5	Trinidad and Tobago	4	0	1	3	1	11	−10	1	Ninth place game

Source: todor66.com

5 July 1979

United States	2–1	Jamaica

5 July 1979

Cuba	2–0	Trinidad and Tobago

6 July 1979

Jamaica	1–1	Trinidad and Tobago

6 July 1979

Argentina	5–1	United States

7 July 1979

Cuba	1–0	Jamaica

7 July 1979

Argentina	7–0	Trinidad and Tobago

9 July 1979

United States	1–0	Trinidad and Tobago

9 July 1979

Argentina	9–0	Cuba

10 July 1979

Cuba	3–3	United States

10 July 1979

Argentina	5–1	Jamaica

==== Group B ====
Pos	Team	Pld	W	D	L	GF	GA	GD	Pts	Qualification
1	Canada	4	4	0	0	24	2	+22	8	Semi-finals
2	Mexico	4	3	0	1	15	11	+4	6	Semi-finals
3	Chile	4	1	1	2	7	8	−1	3	5–8th place semi-finals
4	Barbados	4	1	1	2	7	9	−2	3	5–8th place semi-finals
5	Puerto Rico (H)	4	0	0	4	2	25	−23	0	Ninth place game

Source: todor66.com
(H) Hosts

5 July 1979

Mexico	2–1	Barbados

5 July 1979

Canada	4–1	Chile

6 July 1979

Chile	1–1	Barbados

6 July 1979

Mexico	10–1	Puerto Rico

7 July 1979

Chile	3–0	Puerto Rico

7 July 1979

Canada	5–1	Barbados

9 July 1979

Mexico	3–2	Chile

9 July 1979

Canada	8–0	Puerto Rico

10 July 1979

Barbados	4–1	Puerto Rico

10 July 1979

Canada	7–0	Mexico

=== Ninth to tenth place classification ===
13 July 1979

Trinidad and Tobago	3–1	Puerto Rico

=== Fifth to eighth place classification ===
5–8th place semi-finals
12 July
Chile	1
Jamaica	0
12 July
United States	3
Barbados	2

Fifth place
14 July
Chile (a.e.t.)	3
United States	2
Seventh place
13 July
Barbados	3
Jamaica	2

==== 5–8th place semi-finals ====
12 July 1979

Chile	1–0	Jamaica

12 July 1979

United States	3–2	Barbados

==== Seventh place game ====
13 July 1979

Barbados	3–2	Jamaica

==== Fifth place game ====
14 July 1979

Chile	3–2 (a.e.t.)	United States

=== Medal round ===
Semi-finals
12 July
Argentina	? (Note: Unknown score but Argentina advanced)
Mexico	?
12 July
Canada	9
Cuba	1

Gold medal match
14 July
Argentina	3
Canada	0
Bronze medal match
14 July
Mexico (a.e.t.)	5
Cuba	3

==== Semi-finals ====
12 July 1979

Argentina	?–?	Mexico

12 July 1979

Canada	9–1	Cuba

==== Bronze medal match ====
14 July 1979

Mexico	5–3 (a.e.t.)	Cuba

==== Gold medal match ====
14 July 1979

Argentina	3–0	Canada

== Final standings ==
1. Argentina
2. Canada
3. Mexico
4. Cuba
5. Chile
6. United States
7. Barbados
8. Jamaica
9. Trinidad and Tobago
10. Puerto Rico
