= Jamaica men's national field hockey team =

Jamaica
- Association: PAHF (Americas)
- Confederation: Jamaica Hockey Federation

FIH ranking
- Current: 49 ▲1 (5 August 2026)
- Highest: 57 (March 2015)
- Lowest: 88 (June 2019)

Pan American Games
- Appearances: 6 (first in 1967)
- Best result: 4th (1975)

Pan American Cup
- Appearances: 1 (first in 2000)
- Best result: 11th (2000)

The Jamaica men's national field hockey team represents Jamaica in international field hockey competitions.

== Tournament history ==
=== Pan American Games ===
- 1967 – 5th place
- 1971 – 6th place
- 1975 – 4th place
- 1979 – 8th place
- 1987 – 9th place
- 1991 – 9th place

=== Pan American Cup ===
- 2000 – 11th place

=== Central American and Caribbean Games ===
- 1982 – 5th place
- 1990 – 5th place
- 1998 – 6th place
- 2002 – 6th place
- 2010 – 7th place
- 2014 – 6th place
- 2018 – 6th place
- 2023 – 6th place
- 2026 – 6th place

=== Hockey World League ===
- 2014–15 – Did Not Rank

=== Hockey 5’s World Cup ===
- 2024 – 16th place

== Results and fixtures ==
The following is a list of match results in the last 12 months, as well as any future matches that have been scheduled.

Win Draw Loss Fixture

=== 2026 ===
==== 2026 CAC Games ====
27 July 2026 Pool B	Cuba	1–0	Jamaica	Santo Domingo, Dominican Republic
14:00	Calderón 17'	Report		Stadium: Parque del Este Hockey Stadium

29 July 2026 Pool B	Dominican Republic	2–1	Jamaica	Santo Domingo, Dominican Republic
16:00	Cabrera 26', 47'	Report	Stephenson 48'	Stadium: Parque del Este Hockey Stadium

31 July 2026 Pool B	Venezuela	5–0	Jamaica	Santo Domingo, Dominican Republic
12:00	Alvarez 12'; Simanca 17'; Adrian 38', 51'; Velasquez 44'	Report		Stadium: Parque del Este Hockey Stadium

2 August 2026 5/8 Classification	Barbados	0–2	Jamaica	Santo Domingo, Dominican Republic
08:00		Report	Stephenson 5'; Powell 45'	Stadium: Parque del Este Hockey Stadium

4 August 2026 5/6 Classification	Jamaica	1–4	Dominican Republic	Santo Domingo, Dominican Republic
10:15	Powell 43'	Report	Lopez 5'; Dominguez 22'; Quezada 37'; Cabrera 51'	Stadium: Parque del Este Hockey Stadium

== See also ==
- Jamaica women's national field hockey team
