= Cuba women's national field hockey team =

Cuba
- Association: Cuban Hockey Federation (Federacion Cubana de Hockey)
- Confederation: PAHF (Americas)
Home	Away

FIH ranking
- Current: 37 ▲3 (4 August 2026)

Pan American Games
- Appearances: 8 (first in 1991)
- Best result: 4th (1995)

The Cuba women's national field hockey team represents Cuba in women's international field hockey competitions. They are the Central American and Caribbean Games Champions.

== Tournament History ==
=== Pan American Games ===
- 1991 - 6th place
- 1995 – 4th place
- 1999 – 5th place
- 2007 – 6th place
- 2011 – 5th place
- 2015 – 8th place
- 2019 – 8th place
- 2023 – 6th place

=== Central American and Caribbean Games ===
- 1986 – 5th place
- 1990 – 4th place
- 1993 – (gold)
- 1998 – (gold)
- 2006 – (gold)
- 2014 – (gold)
- 2018 – (gold)
- 2023 – (silver)
- 2026 – (gold)

== Results and fixtures ==
The following is a list of match results in the last 12 months, as well as any future matches that have been scheduled.

Win Draw Loss Fixture

=== 2026 ===
==== 2026 CAC Games ====
26 July 2026 Pool B	Cuba	7–0	Jamaica	Santo Domingo, Dominican Republic
10:00	Darias 1'; Vera 7', 53'; Tamayo 20', 45', 49'; Nikle 33'	Report		Stadium: Parque del Este Hockey Stadium

28 July 2026 Pool B	Barbados	1–7	Cuba	Santo Domingo, Dominican Republic
12:00	Downes 9'	Report	Nikle 1'; Darius 5', 49'; Vera 6', 17'; Tirse 40'; Cordero 48'	Stadium: Parque del Este Hockey Stadium

30 July 2026 Pool B	Cuba	9–0	Bermuda	Santo Domingo, Dominican Republic
10:00	Tamayo 5'; Darias 9', 17'; Ramirez 13'; Martinez 18', 49'; Vera 30', 58'; Serrano 54'	Report		Stadium: Parque del Este Hockey Stadium

1 August 2026 Semi final	Cuba	6–0	Venezuela	Santo Domingo, Dominican Republic
14:45	Vera 9', 20'; Martinez 24'; Tamayo 37'; Darias 44', 49'	Report		Stadium: Parque del Este Hockey Stadium

3 August 2026 Gold medal match	Mexico	0–0 (0–2 p)	Cuba	Santo Domingo, Dominican Republic
14:45		Report		Stadium: Parque del Este Hockey Stadium
	Penalties
	Mendoza (penalty shoot-out missed); Lacheno (penalty shoot-out missed); Estrada (penalty shoot-out missed); Espinoza (penalty shoot-out missed)		(penalty shoot-out scored) Licea; (penalty shoot-out missed) Ramirez; (penalty shoot-out scored) Nikle

== See also ==
- Cuba men's national field hockey team
