= Jamaica women's national field hockey team =

Jamaica
- Association: Jamaica Hockey Federation
- Confederation: PAHF (Americas)
- Head Coach: Michelle Holt
- Assistant coach(es): Nicole Bradshaw
- Manager: Kameisha Erskine

FIH ranking
- Current: 73 ▼7 (4 August 2026)

Pan American Games
- Appearances: 4 (first in 1987)
- Best result: 5th (1991)

Pan American Cup
- Appearances: 2 (first in 2001)
- Best result: 5th (2001)
Medal record
Central American and Caribbean Games
Gold medal – first place	1990 Mexico City	Team
Silver medal – second place	1986 Santiago	Team
Silver medal – second place	1993 Ponce	Team
Silver medal – second place	2002 Puerto Rico	Team
Bronze medal – third place	1998 Caracas	Team

The Jamaica women's national field hockey team represents Jamaica in women's international field hockey competitions and is controlled by the Jamaica Hockey Federation, the governing body for field hockey in Jamaica.

== Tournament record ==
=== Pan American Games ===
- 1987 – 6th place
- 1991 – 5th place
- 1995 – 6th place
- 2003 – 7th place

=== Pan American Cup ===
- 2001 – 5th place
- 2009 – 7th place

=== Central American and Caribbean Games ===
- 1986 – (silver)
- 1990 – (gold)
- 1993 – (silver)
- 1998 – (bronze)
- 2002 – (silver)
- 2006 – 5th place
- 2010 – 6th place
- 2014 – 7th place
- 2018 – 6th place
- 2023 – 5th place
- 2026 – 7th place

=== Commonwealth Games ===
- 1998 – 8th place

=== Hockey World League ===
- 2014–15 – Round 1

== Results and fixtures ==
The following is a list of match results in the last 12 months, as well as any future matches that have been scheduled.

Win Draw Loss Fixture

=== 2026 ===
==== 2026 CAC Games ====
26 July 2026 Pool B	Cuba	7–0	Jamaica	Santo Domingo, Dominican Republic
10:00	Darias 1'; Vera 7', 53'; Tamayo 20', 45', 49'; Nikle 33'	Report		Stadium: Parque del Este Hockey Stadium

28 July 2026 Pool B	Jamaica	0–1	Bermuda	Santo Domingo, Dominican Republic
10:00		Report	Smith 60'	Stadium: Parque del Este Hockey Stadium

30 July 2026 Pool B	Jamaica	1–3	Barbados	Santo Domingo, Dominican Republic
14:00	Griffiths- Harris 60+'	Report	Prescod 48'; Edwards 51'; Wilson 58'	Stadium: Parque del Este Hockey Stadium

1 August 2026 5/8 Classification	Dominican Republic	1–0	Jamaica	Santo Domingo, Dominican Republic
08:00	Oflaherti 43'	Report		Stadium: Parque del Este Hockey Stadium

3 August 2026 7/8 Classification	Jamaica	1–0	Bermuda	Santo Domingo, Dominican Republic
08:00	Packham 9'	Report		Stadium: Parque del Este Hockey Stadium

== See also ==
- Jamaica men's national field hockey team
