= Puerto Rico men's national field hockey team =

Puerto Rico
- Association: Puerto Rican Hockey Federation (Federacion Puertorriquena de Hockey)
- Confederation: PAHF (Americas)

FIH ranking
- Current: 60 ▲1 (4 October 2026)
- Highest: 31 (2006)
- Lowest: 67 (June 2014 – July 2015)

Pan American Games
- Appearances: 1 (first in 1979)
- Best result: 10th (1979)

Pan American Cup
- Appearances: 2 (first in 2000)
- Best result: 6th (2000)

The Puerto Rico men's national field hockey team represents Puerto Rico in men's international field hockey competitions and is controlled by the Puerto Rican Hockey Federation, the governing body for field hockey in Puerto Rico.

They have participated once at the Pan American Games in 1979 when they finished in last and tenth place.

== Tournament record ==
=== Pan American Games ===
- 1979 – 10th place

=== Pan American Cup ===
- 2000 – 6th place
- 2004 – 8th place

=== Central American and Caribbean Games ===
- 1982 – 6th place
- 1986 – 6th place
- 1993 – 7th place
- 1998 – 5th place
- 2002 – 5th place
- 2006 – 7th place
- 2010 – 6th place
- 2023 – Withdrew

=== Pan American Challenge ===
- 2015 – 6th place

=== FIH Hockey Series ===
- 2018–19 – First round

=== Alba Games ===
- 2007 – (bronze)

== See also ==
- Puerto Rico women's national field hockey team
