= Barbados women's national field hockey team =

Women's national field hockey team

Barbados
- Association: PAHF (Americas)
- Confederation: Barbados Hockey Federation

FIH ranking
- Current: 48 ▼6 (4 August 2026)

Pan American Games
- Appearances: 3 (first in 1987)
- Best result: 5th (1987)

Pan American Cup
- Appearances: 1 (first in 2004)
- Best result: 6th (2004)
Medal record
Central American and Caribbean Games
Bronze medal – third place	1986 Santiago	Team
Bronze medal – third place	2002 Puerto Rico	Team
Bronze medal – third place	2006 Santo Domingo	Team
Bronze medal – third place	2010 Mayagüez	Team

The Barbados women's national field hockey team represents Barbados in women's international field hockey competitions.

== Tournament history ==
=== Pan American Games ===
- 1987 – 5th place
- 1991 – 8th place
- 2011 – 8th place

=== Pan American Cup ===
- 2004 – 6th place
- 2017 – Withdrew

=== Commonwealth Games ===
- 2006 - 9th place

=== Central American and Caribbean Games ===
- 1986 – (bronze)
- 1993 – 4th place
- 1998 – 4th place
- 2002 – (bronze)
- 2006 – (bronze)
- 2010 – (bronze)
- 2014 – 5th place
- 2018 – 4th place
- 2023 – (bronze)
- 2026 – 4th place

=== Pan American Challenge ===
- 2015 – (silver)

== Results and fixtures ==
The following is a list of match results in the last 12 months, as well as any future matches that have been scheduled.

Win Draw Loss Fixture

=== 2026 ===
==== 2026 CAC Games ====
26 July 2026 Pool B	Barbados	3–2	Bermuda	Santo Domingo, Dominican Republic
12:00	Wilson 43', 57'; Downes 55'	Report	Stempel 10'; Davidson 14'	Stadium: Parque del Este Hockey Stadium

28 July 2026 Pool B	Barbados	1–7	Cuba	Santo Domingo, Dominican Republic
12:00	Downes 9'	Report	Nikle 1'; Darius 5', 49'; Vera 6', 17'; Tirse 40'; Cordero 48'	Stadium: Parque del Este Hockey Stadium

30 July 2026 Pool B	Jamaica	1–3	Barbados	Santo Domingo, Dominican Republic
14:00	Griffiths- Harris 60+'	Report	Prescod 48'; Edwards 51'; Wilson 58'	Stadium: Parque del Este Hockey Stadium

1 August 2026 Semi final	Mexico	5–0	Barbados	Santo Domingo, Dominican Republic
12:30	Pérez 9', 60'; Espinoza 29'; Rivera 38', 51'	Report		Stadium: Parque del Este Hockey Stadium

3 August 2026 Bronze medal match	Barbados	1–4	Venezuela	Santo Domingo, Dominican Republic
12:30	Downes 19'	Report	Sanchez 10'; Rodriguez 11'; Artigas 14'; Mujica 49'	Stadium: Parque del Este Hockey Stadium

== See also ==
- Barbados men's national field hockey team
