= 2000 Men's Pan American Cup =

International field hockey competition

Tournament details
- Host country: Cuba
- City: Havana
- Dates: 22 June – 2 July
- Teams: 11 (from 1 confederation)

Final positions
- Champions: Cuba (1st title)
- Runner-up: Canada
- Third place: Argentina

Tournament statistics
- Matches played: 35
- Goals scored: 243 (6.94 per match)

The 2000 Men's Pan American Cup was the first edition of the Men's Pan American Cup, the quadrennial men's international field hockey championship of the Americas organized by the Pan American Hockey Federation. It was held from 22 June to 2 July 2000 in Havana, Cuba. The tournament doubled as the qualifier to the 2002 Hockey World Cup to be held in Kuala Lumpur, Malaysia. The winner would qualify directly while the teams ranked between 2nd and 5th would have the chance to obtain one of seven berths at the World Cup Qualifier in Edinburgh, Scotland.

Cuba won the tournament for the first time after defeating Canada 2–1 in the final, earning an automatic berth at the 2002 Hockey World Cup.

== Teams ==
- Argentina
- Barbados
- Canada
- Chile
- Cuba
- Jamaica
- Mexico
- Peru
- Puerto Rico
- United States
- Venezuela

== Results ==
All times are Cuba Daylight Time (UTC-04:00)

=== First round ===
==== Pool A ====
Pos	Team	Pld	W	D	L	GF	GA	GD	Pts	Qualification
1	Cuba (H)	5	5	0	0	51	1	+50	15	Semi-finals
2	Argentina	5	4	0	1	58	3	+55	12	Semi-finals
3	Puerto Rico	5	3	0	2	7	26	−19	9	
4	Peru	5	1	1	3	5	40	−35	4	
5	Venezuela	5	0	2	3	3	28	−25	2	
6	Barbados	5	0	1	4	1	27	−26	1	

Source: PAHF
(H) Hosts

22 June 2000
08:30

Puerto Rico	3 – 0	Barbados

22 June 2000
15:00

Argentina	1 – 3	Cuba

22 June 2000
17:00

Peru	2 – 2	Venezuela

23 June 2000
15:00

Venezuela	0 – 0	Barbados

23 June 2000
17:00

Argentina	14 – 0	Puerto Rico

24 June 2000
08:30

Cuba	14 – 0	Peru

25 June 2000
08:30

Puerto Rico	2 – 1	Venezuela

25 June 2000
15:00

Argentina	21 – 0	Peru

25 June 2000
17:00

Barbados	0 – 14	Cuba

26 June 2000
17:00

Barbados	0 – 8	Argentina

27 June 2000
08:30

Cuba	10 – 0	Venezuela

27 June 2000
10:30

Peru	1 – 2	Puerto Rico

28 June 2000
08:30

Peru	2 – 1	Barbados

28 June 2000
10:30

Venezuela	0 – 14	Argentina

28 June 2000
15:00

Cuba	10-0	Puerto Rico

==== Pool B ====
Pos	Team	Pld	W	D	L	GF	GA	GD	Pts	Qualification
1	Canada	4	4	0	0	29	2	+27	12	Semi-finals
2	Chile	4	3	0	1	27	3	+24	9	Semi-finals
3	United States	4	2	0	2	11	7	+4	6	
4	Mexico	4	1	0	3	4	29	−25	3	
5	Jamaica	4	0	0	4	1	31	−30	0	

Source: PAHF

22 June 2000
10:30

Canada	9–0	Jamaica

23 June 2000
08:30

United States	6–0	Mexico
Hindy 15', 41'; Nakamura 26', 56'; Harris 34'; K. Kainth 53'	Report

23 June 2000
10:30

Canada	3–2	Chile

24 June 2000
15:00

Mexico	0–9	Chile

24 June 2000
17:00

Jamaica	0–5	United States
	Report	Hindy 9'; D. Kainth 16', 51'; Shanafelt 17'; Reed 34'

26 June 2000
08:30

United States	0–4	Canada
	Report	Short 4'; Brahmst 5'; Mosher 22'; Kullar

26 June 2000
10:30

Jamaica	1–4	Mexico

27 June 2000
15:00

Mexico	0–13	Canada

27 June 2000
17:00

Chile	13–0	Jamaica

28 June 2000
17:00

Chile	3–0	United States

=== Ninth to eleventh place classification ===
7–9th place semi-final
1 July
Barbados	1
Jamaica	0

Ninth place
2 July
Venezuela	0
Barbados	3

==== 7–9th place semi-final ====
1 July 2000
12:00

Barbados	1 – 0	Jamaica

==== Ninth place game ====
2 July 2000
12:00

Venezuela	0 – 3	Barbados

=== Fifth to eighth place classification ===
5–8th place semi-finals
30 June
Puerto Rico	3
Mexico	0
30 June
Peru	1
United States	3

Fifth place
1 July
Puerto Rico	3
United States	5
Seventh place
1 July
Mexico	3
Peru	1

==== 5–8th place semi-finals ====
30 June 2000
08:30

Puerto Rico	3 – 0	Mexico

30 June 2000
11:00

Peru	1 – 3	United States
	Report

==== Seventh place game ====
1 July 2000
14:30

Mexico	3 – 1	Peru

==== Fifth place game ====
1 July 2000
17:00

Puerto Rico	3 – 5	United States

=== First to fourth place classification ===
Semi-finals
30 June
Cuba	8
Chile	0
30 June
Argentina	2 (0)
Canada (p.s.)	2 (3)

Final
2 July
Cuba	2
Canada	1
Third place
2 July
Chile	0
Argentina	8

==== Semi-finals ====
30 June 2000
14:30

Cuba	8 – 0	Chile

30 June 2000
17:00

Argentina	2 – 2 (a.e.t.)	Canada
Penalties
	0 – 3

==== Third place game ====
2 July 2000
08:00

Chile	0 – 8	Argentina

==== Final ====
2 July 2000
10:30

Canada	1 – 2	Cuba

2000 Men's Pan American Cup winners

Cuba
First title

== Final standings ==
Rank	Team
1st place, gold medalist(s)	Cuba
2nd place, silver medalist(s)	Canada
3rd place, bronze medalist(s)	Argentina
4	Chile
5	United States
6	Puerto Rico
7	Mexico
8	Peru
9	Barbados
10	Venezuela
11	Jamaica

Qualified for the 2002 World Cup

Qualified for the 2001 World Cup Qualifier
