= Field hockey at the 2018 Central American and Caribbean Games =

- Location: Barranquilla, Colombia
- Dates: 20–29 July
- Nations: 8

Champions
- Men: Cuba
- Women: Cuba

Both the men's and the women's field hockey competitions at the 2018 Central American and Caribbean Games was held in conjunction with one another between 20 – 30 July 2018 in Barranquilla, Colombia.

The top two teams in each tournament qualified for the 2019 Pan American Games in Lima, Peru.

== Medal summary ==
=== Medalists ===
Event	Gold	Silver	Bronze
Men	Cuba	Mexico	Trinidad and Tobago
Women	Cuba	Mexico	Trinidad and Tobago

=== Medal table ===
Rank	Nation	Gold	Silver	Bronze	Total
1	Cuba (CUB)	2	0	0	2
2	Mexico (MEX)	0	2	0	2
3	Trinidad and Tobago (TTO)	0	0	2	2
Totals (3 entries)		2	2	2	6

== Qualification ==
=== Men's qualification ===
Means of qualification	Date	Venue	Vacancies	Qualifier
Host country	11 June 2014	(Mexico) Veracruz	~~1~~	~~Colombia~~
2014 CAC Games	16–24 November 2014	(Mexico) Veracruz	5	Cuba; Trinidad and Tobago; Mexico; Barbados; Dominican Republic
CAC Games Qualifier	5–12 November 2017	(Jamaica) Kingston	2	Jamaica; Guyana
Wildcard			1	Guatemala
Total			8	

=== Women's qualification ===
Means of qualification	Date	Venue	Vacancies	Qualifier
Host country	11 June 2014	(Mexico) Veracruz	~~1~~	~~Colombia~~
2014 CAC Games	15–23 November 2014	(Mexico) Veracruz	5	Cuba; Dominican Republic; Mexico; Trinidad and Tobago; Barbados
CAC Games Qualifier	5–12 November 2017	(Jamaica) Kingston	2	Guyana; Jamaica
Wildcard			1	Guatemala
Total			8	

== Men's tournament ==
Men's field hockey at the 2018 Central American and Caribbean Games

Tournament details
- Host country: Colombia
- City: Barranquilla
- Dates: 21–29 July
- Teams: 8

Final positions
- Champions: Cuba (8th title)
- Runner-up: Mexico
- Third place: Trinidad and Tobago

Tournament statistics
- Matches played: 19
- Goals scored: 61 (3.21 per match)
- Top scorer: (Mexico) Francisco Aguilar (8 goals)

=== Preliminary round ===
All times are local (UTC –5).

==== Pool A ====
Pos	Team	Pld	W	D	L	GF	GA	GD	Pts	Qualification
1	Cuba	3	2	0	1	10	4	+6	6	Semifinals
2	Trinidad and Tobago	3	2	0	1	6	3	+3	6	Semifinals
3	Barbados	3	2	0	1	5	5	0	6	5–8th place semifinals
4	Jamaica	3	0	0	3	0	9	−9	0	5–8th place semifinals

Source: FIH
Rules for classification: 1) points; 2) goal difference; 3) goals scored; 4) head-to-head result.

21 July 2018
10:00

Trinidad and Tobago	2–1	Cuba
Te. Marcano 13'; Pierre 50'	Report	Sánchez 37'

Umpires:
Maximiliano Scala (ARG)
Gus Soteriades (USA)

21 July 2018
12:00

Barbados	1–0	Jamaica
Sho. Wharton 12'	Report

Umpires:
Jonathan Altamirano (MEX)
Devin Hooper (GUY)

23 July 2018
14:00

Cuba	5–0	Jamaica
Valero 10'; Sarduy 33', 35'; Sánchez 37'; Martínez 42'	Report

Umpires:
Gus Soteriades (USA)
Jonathan Altamirano (MEX)

23 July 2018
16:00

Barbados	2–1	Trinidad and Tobago
Warner 25'; Rudder 32'	Report	Ta. Marcano 6'

Umpires:
Ridge Bair (USA)
Maximiliano Scala (ARG)

25 July 2018
12:00

Trinidad and Tobago	3–0	Jamaica
Toussaint 25', 55'; Te. Marcano 47'	Report

Umpires:
Gus Soteriades (USA)
Jonathan Altamirano (MEX)

25 July 2018
16:00

Cuba	4–2	Barbados
Calderon 13', 24', 60'; Aguilera 41'	Report	Warner 36'; Rudder 47'

Umpires:
Maximiliano Scala (ARG)
Devin Hooper (GUY)

==== Pool B ====
Pos	Team	Pld	W	D	L	GF	GA	GD	Pts	Qualification
1	Mexico	3	3	0	0	9	1	+8	9	Semifinals
2	Guyana	3	2	0	1	11	4	+7	6	Semifinals
3	Dominican Republic	3	1	0	2	5	7	−2	3	5–8th place semifinals
4	Guatemala	3	0	0	3	1	14	−13	0	5–8th place semifinals

Source: FIH
Rules for classification: 1) points; 2) goal difference; 3) goals scored; 4) head-to-head result.

21 July 2018
14:00

Guyana	3–1	Dominican Republic
A. Branford 39'; Dannett 49'; Assanah 50'	Report	García 2'

Umpires:
Kevin George (TTO)
Austin Paquette (CAN)

21 July 2018
16:00

Mexico	3–0	Guatemala
Villegas 34'; F. Aguilar 54'; Y. Méndez 58'	Report

Umpires:
Richard Harris (JAM)
Ridge Bair (USA)

23 July 2018
10:00

Guatemala	1–3	Dominican Republic
Leiva 13'	Report	Nivar 10'; Jo. Moncion 34'; García 57'

Umpires:
Shane Lewis (BAR)
Richard Harris (JAM)

23 July 2018
12:00

Guyana	0–3	Mexico
	Report	F. Aguilar 24', 31', 52'

Umpires:
Reinier Díaz (CUB)
Austin Paquette (CAN)

25 July 2018
10:00

Mexico	3–1	Dominican Republic
F. Aguilar 47', 56', 60'	Report	J. López 30'

Umpires:
Reinier Díaz (CUB)
Shane Lewis (BAR)

25 July 2018
14:00

Guatemala	0–8	Guyana
	Report	Me. Sargeant 15'; Hope 22'; Bell 31', 46', 52'; A. Branford 44'; France 59', 60'

Umpires:
Kevin George (TTO)
Austin Paquette (CAN)

=== Fifth to eighth place classification ===
5–8th place semifinals
27 July
Barbados	4
Guatemala	0
27 July
Dominican Republic (s.o.)	0 (1)
Jamaica	0 (0)

5th place
29 July
Barbados	5
Dominican Republic	0
7th place
29 July
Guatemala	0 (0)
Jamaica (s.o.)	0 (3)

==== 5–8th place semifinals ====
27 July 2018
09:45

Barbados	4–0	Guatemala
Warner 21', 28', 59'; Gibson 49'	Report

Umpires:
Ridge Bair (USA)
Richard Harris (JAM)

27 July 2018
11:30

Dominican Republic	0–0	Jamaica
	Report
Penalties
	1–0

Umpires:
Devin Hooper (GUY)
Kevin George (TTO)

==== 7th & 8th place ====
29 July 2018
09:45

Guatemala	0–0	Jamaica
	Report
Penalties
	0–3

Umpires:
Ridge Bair (USA)
Reinier Díaz (CUB)

==== 5th & 6th place ====
29 July 2018
12:00

Barbados	5–0 Forfeit	Dominican Republic
	Report

=== First to fourth place classification ===
Semi-finals
27 July
Cuba	1
Guyana	0
27 July
Mexico (PSO)	1 (4)
Trinidad and Tobago	1 (2)

Final
29 July
Cuba	2
Mexico	0
Third place
29 July
Guyana	0
Trinidad and Tobago	5

==== Semifinals ====
27 July 2018
13:45

Cuba	1–0	Guyana
Consuegra 17'	Report

Umpires:
Maximiliano Scala (ARG)
Shane Lewis (BAR)

27 July 2018
16:00

Mexico	1–1	Trinidad and Tobago
F. Aguilar 5'	Report	Pierre 19'
Penalties
	4–2

Umpires:
Gus Soteriades (USA)
Reinier Díaz (CUB)

==== Third and fourth place ====
29 July 2018
14:15

Guyana	0–5	Trinidad and Tobago
	Report	Ta. Marcano 2'; Browne 8', 52'; Pierre 51'; Daniel 56'

Umpires:
Richard Harris (JAM)
Shane Lewis (BAR)

==== Final ====
29 July 2018
16:30

Cuba	2–0	Mexico
Sarduy 28'; Sánchez 44'	Report

Umpires:
Maximiliano Scala (ARG)
Gus Soteriades (USA)

=== Final standings ===
Rank	Team
1st place, gold medalist(s)	Cuba
2nd place, silver medalist(s)	Mexico
3rd place, bronze medalist(s)	Trinidad and Tobago
4	Guyana
5	Barbados
6	Jamaica
7	Guatemala
8	Dominican Republic

Team qualified to the 2019 Pan American Games

== Women's tournament ==
Women's field hockey at the 2018 Central American and Caribbean Games

Tournament details
- Host country: Colombia
- City: Barranquilla
- Dates: 20–28 July
- Teams: 8

Final positions
- Champions: Cuba (5th title)
- Runner-up: Mexico
- Third place: Trinidad and Tobago

Tournament statistics
- Matches played: 20
- Goals scored: 70 (3.5 per match)
- Top scorer(s): (Dominican Republic) Agustina Birocho (Trinidad and Tobago) Shaniah De Freitas (7 goals)

=== Preliminary round ===
All times are local (UTC –5).

==== Pool A ====
Pos	Team	Pld	W	D	L	GF	GA	GD	Pts	Qualification
1	Mexico	3	3	0	0	6	0	+6	9	Semifinals
2	Cuba	3	2	0	1	5	5	0	6	Semifinals
3	Dominican Republic	3	1	0	2	6	4	+2	3	5–8th place semifinals
4	Guyana	3	0	0	3	0	8	−8	0	5–8th place semifinals

Source: FIH
Rules for classification: 1) points; 2) goal difference; 3) goals scored; 4) head-to-head result.

20 July 2018
10:00

Mexico	3–0	Cuba
Estrada 45', 57'; Navarro 60'	Report

Umpires:
Catalina Montesino Wenzel (CHI)
Morgan Ames (USA)

20 July 2018
12:00

Dominican Republic	4–0	Guyana
González 40'; O'Flaherty 43'; Williams 55'; Birocho 57'	Report

Umpires:
Erin de Sousa (CAN)
Tracy Lee (TTO)

22 July 2018
14:00

Cuba	2–0	Guyana
Milanés 38'; Nikle 50'	Report

Umpires:
Meghan McLennan (CAN)
Diana Fuentes Castelo (MEX)

22 July 2018
16:00

Dominican Republic	0–1	Mexico
	Report	Navarro 38'

Umpires:
Mercedes Sanchez (ARG)
Richanne Gaskin (BAR)

24 July 2018
12:00

Mexico	2–0	Guyana
Oviedo 5'; Navarro 31'	Report

Umpires:
Tracy Lee (TTO)
Morgan Ames (USA)

24 July 2018
16:00

Cuba	3–2	Dominican Republic
Vera 23', 30'; Paso 34'	Report	Navamuel 5'; Moronta 37'

Umpires:
Ana Vázquez (MEX)
Meghan McLennan (CAN)

==== Pool B ====
Pos	Team	Pld	W	D	L	GF	GA	GD	Pts	Qualification
1	Trinidad and Tobago	3	3	0	0	15	1	+14	9	Semifinals
2	Barbados	3	2	0	1	12	3	+9	6	Semifinals
3	Jamaica	3	1	0	2	5	2	+3	3	5–8th place semifinals
4	Guatemala	3	0	0	3	1	27	−26	0	5–8th place semifinals

Source: FIH
Rules for classification: 1) points; 2) goal difference; 3) goals scored; 4) head-to-head result.

20 July 2018
14:00

Trinidad and Tobago	12–0	Guatemala
De Gannes 1', 3', 33', 60'; Govia 6', 32'; Young 17'; King 32'; Thompson 37', 55'; Sh. De Freitas 41', 54'	Report

Umpires:
Diana Fuentes Castelo (MEX)
Richanne Gaskin (BAR)

20 July 2018
16:00

Barbados	1–0	Jamaica
Nakir. Downes 44'	Report

Umpires:
Mercedes Sanchez (ARG)
Escalante Ana Vazquez (MEX)

22 July 2018
10:00

Jamaica	5–0	Guatemala
Nicholson 36'; Elliott 38', 43'; Knight 50'; Griffiths 51'	Report

Umpires:
Morgan Ames (USA)
Erin de Sousa (CAN)

22 July 2018
12:00

Trinidad and Tobago	2–1	Barbados
Sh. De Freitas 22', 58'	Report	Boyce 17'

Umpires:
Catalina Montesino Wenzel (CHI)
Stephanie Adams (JAM)

24 July 2018
10:00

Barbados	10–1	Guatemala
Wilson 1', 59'; Boyce 8', 49'; Rock 11', 14'; Nakis. Downes 29'; Krysten Mayers 30'; Edwards 34'; Small 46'	Report	Bernardo 27'

Umpires:
Erin de Sousa (CAN)
Stephanie Adams (JAM)

24 July 2018
14:00

Jamaica	0–1	Trinidad and Tobago
	Report	Sh. De Freitas 34'

Umpires:
Mercedes Sánchez (ARG)
Diana Fuentes (MEX)

=== Fifth to eighth place classification ===
5–8th place semifinals
26 July
Dominican Republic	7
Guatemala	0
26 July
Jamaica (PSO)	0 (3)
Guyana	0 (0)

5th place
28 July
Dominican Republic	4
Jamaica	1
7th place
28 July
Guatemala	0
Guyana	1

==== 5–8th place semifinals ====
26 July 2018
09:45

Dominican Republic	7–0	Guatemala
Moronta 9'; Disanti 22'; Birocho 28', 30', 33', 50', 60'	Report

Umpires:
Tracy Lee (TTO)
Stephanie Adams (JAM)

26 July 2018
11:45

Jamaica	0–0	Guyana
	Report
Penalties
	3–0

Umpires:
Ana Vázquez (MEX)
Richanne Gaskin (BAR)

==== 7th & 8th place ====
28 July 2018
09:45

Guatemala	0–1	Guyana
	Report	G. Xavier 6'

Umpires:
Morgan Ames (USA)
Stephanie Adams (JAM)

==== 5th & 6th place ====
28 July 2018
12:00

Dominican Republic	4–1	Jamaica
O'Flaherty 42', 43'; Birocho 53'; Navamuel 60+'	Report	Knight 58'

Umpires:
Richanne Gaskin (BAR)
Tracy Lee (TTO)

=== First to fourth place classification ===
Semi-finals
26 July
Mexico	1
Barbados	0
26 July
Trinidad and Tobago	0
Cuba	3

Final
28 July
Mexico	0
Cuba	1
Third place
28 July
Barbados	0
Trinidad and Tobago	2

==== Semifinals ====
26 July 2018
13:45

Mexico	1–0	Barbados
Valdes 58'	Report

Umpires:
Meghan McLennan (CAN)
Catalina Montesino (CHI)

26 July 2018
16:00

Trinidad and Tobago	0–3	Cuba
	Report	Vera 19'; Milanés 29'; Ramos 58'

Umpires:
Mercedes Sánchez (ARG)
Diana Fuentes (MEX)

==== Third and fourth place ====
28 July 2018
14:15

Barbados	0–2	Trinidad and Tobago
	Report	Sh. De Freitas 13', 59'

Umpires:
Ana Vázquez (MEX)
Erin de Sousa (CAN)

==== Final ====
28 July 2018
16:30

Mexico	0–1	Cuba
	Report	Nikle 37'

Umpires:
Catalina Montesino (CHI)
Meghan McLennan (CAN)

=== Final standings ===
Rank	Team
1st place, gold medalist(s)	Cuba
2nd place, silver medalist(s)	Mexico
3rd place, bronze medalist(s)	Trinidad and Tobago
4	Barbados
5	Dominican Republic
6	Jamaica
7	Guyana
8	Guatemala

Team qualified to the 2019 Pan American Games
