= Puerto Rico women's national field hockey team =

Puerto Rico
- Association: Puerto Rican Hockey Federation (Federacion Puertorriquena de Hockey)
- Confederation: PAHF (Americas)

FIH ranking
- Current: 57 ▼14 (4 August 2026)

The Puerto Rico Women’s National Field Hockey Team represents Puerto Rico in women's international field hockey competitions and is controlled by the Puerto Rican Hockey Federation, the governing body for field hockey in Puerto Rico.

They have never participated at the Pan American Games or in the Pan American Cup.

== Tournament Record Senior Team ==
=== Central American and Caribbean Games Qualifier ===
- 2025 – (bronze)

=== Central American and Caribbean Games ===
- 2002 – 5th place
- 2010 – 7th place
- 2023 – 7th place
- 2026 – 6th place

=== Pan American Challenge ===
- 2015 – 4th place

=== FIH Hockey Series ===
- 2018–19 – First round

=== Hockey World League ===
- 2014–15 – Round 1

== Tournament Record Junior Team ==
- 2025 Junior Pan American Challenge – (silver)
- 2025 Junior Pan American Games – DNP

== Results and fixtures ==
The following is a list of match results in the last 12 months, as well as any future matches that have been scheduled.

Win Draw Loss Fixture

=== 2026 ===
==== 2026 CAC Games ====
26 July 2026 Pool A	Puerto Rico	1–4	Venezuela	Santo Domingo, Dominican Republic
14:00	Vazquez 14'	Report	González 46', 58'; Mujica 49'; Rodriguez 54'	Stadium: Parque del Este Hockey Stadium

28 July 2026 Pool A	Puerto Rico	1–5	Mexico	Santo Domingo, Dominican Republic
14:00	Dukes 23'	Report	Rivera 14', 27'; Lacheno 15+', 54'; Mendoza 34'	Stadium: Parque del Este Hockey Stadium

30 July 2026 Pool A	Dominican Republic	1–1	Puerto Rico	Santo Domingo, Dominican Republic
16:00	Gonzalez 52'	Report	Landis 41'	Stadium: Parque del Este Hockey Stadium

1 August 2026 5/8 Classification	Bermuda	1–1 (1–3 p)	Puerto Rico	Santo Domingo, Dominican Republic
10:15	Brewer 18'	Report	Yazzetti 11'	Stadium: Parque del Este Hockey Stadium
	Penalties
	de Silva (penalty shoot-out scored); Brewer (penalty shoot-out missed); Hollis (penalty shoot-out missed); Stewart (penalty shoot-out missed)		(penalty shoot-out scored) Morales; (penalty shoot-out missed) Woods; (penalty shoot-out scored) Ruiz; (penalty shoot-out scored) Aponte

3 August 2026 5/6 Classification	Dominican Republic	2–1	Puerto Rico	Santo Domingo, Dominican Republic
10:15	Birocho 27', 51'	Report	Leon 5'	Stadium: Parque del Este Hockey Stadium

== See also ==
- Puerto Rico men's national field hockey team
