= Dominican Republic men's national field hockey team =

Dominican Republic
- Association: Dominican Hockey Federation (Federación Dominicana de Hockey)
- Confederation: PAHF (Americas)

FIH ranking
- Current: 48 ▲1 (5 August 2026)
- Highest: 55 (November 2015 – August 2016)
- Lowest: 86 (June 2019)

Pan American Games
- Appearances: 1 (first in 2003)
- Best result: 8th (2003)
Medal record
Bolivarian Games
Bronze medal – third place	2013 Chicalyo	Team

The Dominican Republic men's national field hockey team represents the Dominican Republic in international men's field hockey and is controlled by the Dominican Hockey Federation. The team are a member of the Pan American Hockey Federation, the governing body for field hockey in the Americas.

The Dominican Republic has never qualified for the Summer Olympics or the World Cup.

== Tournament record ==
=== Pan American Games ===
- 2003 – 8th place

=== Central American and Caribbean Games ===
- 2006 – 8th place
- 2010 – 5th place
- 2014 – 5th place
- 2018 – 8th place
- 2023 – 5th place
- 2026 – 5th place

=== Bolivarian Games ===
- 2013 – (bronze)
- 2025 – 4th place

== Results and fixtures ==
The following is a list of match results in the last 12 months, as well as any future matches that have been scheduled.

Win Draw Loss Fixture

=== 2026 ===
==== 2026 CAC Games ====
27 July 2026 Pool B	Venezuela	0–0	Dominican Republic	Santo Domingo, Dominican Republic
16:00		Report		Stadium: Parque del Este Hockey Stadium

29 July 2026 Pool B	Dominican Republic	2–1	Jamaica	Santo Domingo, Dominican Republic
16:00	Cabrera 26', 47'	Report	Stephenson 48'	Stadium: Parque del Este Hockey Stadium

31 July 2026 Pool B	Dominican Republic	5–7	Cuba	Santo Domingo, Dominican Republic
16:00	Cabrera 9'; Anton 17'; Moncion 28', 51'; Nivar 43'	Report	Batista 2'; Viera 3'; Calderón 8', 22', 57'; Neninger 38'; Echevarría 51'	Stadium: Parque del Este Hockey Stadium

2 August 2026 5/8 Classification	Dominican Republic	4–1	Guatemala	Santo Domingo, Dominican Republic
10:15	Cruz L 53'; Lopez 53'; Moncion 58'; Emiliano 60'	Report	González 20'	Stadium: Parque del Este Hockey Stadium

4 August 2026 5/6 Classification	Jamaica	1–4	Dominican Republic	Santo Domingo, Dominican Republic
10:15	Powell 43'	Report	Lopez 5'; Dominguez 22'; Quezada 37'; Cabrera 51'	Stadium: Parque del Este Hockey Stadium

== See also ==
- Dominican Republic women's national field hockey team
