= Barbados men's national field hockey team =

Barbados
- Association: PAHF (Americas)
- Confederation: Barbados Hockey Association
- Head Coach: Dominic Hill
- Manager: Alain Hinds
- Captain: Andre Boyce

FIH ranking
- Current: 56 ▼1 (6 November 2026)
- Highest: 30 (2003)
- Lowest: 68 (2006)

Pan American Games
- Appearances: 6 (first in 1979)
- Best result: 4th (1991)

Pan American Cup
- Appearances: 1 (first in 2000)
- Best result: 9th (2000)
Medal record
Central American and Caribbean Games
Silver medal – second place	2002 Puerto Rico	Team
Bronze medal – third place	1982 Havana	Team
Bronze medal – third place	2010 Mayagüez	Team

The Barbados men's national field hockey team represents Barbados in international field hockey competitions.

== Tournament history ==
=== Pan American Games ===
- 1979 – 7th place
- 1983 – 9th place
- 1987 – 6th place
- 1991 – 4th place
- 2003 – 7th place
- 2011 – 8th place

=== Pan American Cup ===
- 2000 – 9th place

=== Central American and Caribbean Games ===
- 1982 – (bronze)
- 1986 – 4th place
- 1993 – 4th place
- 1998 – 4th place
- 2002 – (silver)
- 2006 – 5th place
- 2010 – (bronze)
- 2014 – 4th place
- 2018 – 5th place
- 2026 – 7th

=== Commonwealth Games ===
- 2002 – 8th place

=== Hockey World League ===
- 2012–13 – Unranked
- 2014–15 – Unranked
- 2016–17 – 34th place

== Results and fixtures ==
The following is a list of match results in the last 12 months, as well as any future matches that have been scheduled.

Win Draw Loss Fixture

=== 2026 ===
==== 2026 CAC Games ====
27 July 2026 Pool A	Guatemala	2–4	Barbados	Santo Domingo, Dominican Republic
12:00	Mendez 28'; Calderón 39'	Report	Wharton 7', 28'; Gibson 56'; Springer 57'	Stadium: Parque del Este Hockey Stadium

29 July 2026 Pool A	Trinidad and Tobago	5–0	Barbados	Santo Domingo, Dominican Republic
10:00	Guiseppi 12'; Reynes 15+'; Whiteman 27'; Siu Butt 34', 59'	Report		Stadium: Parque del Este Hockey Stadium

31 July 2026 Pool A	Mexico	3–0	Barbados	Santo Domingo, Dominican Republic
10:00	Benedith 40'; Sosa 41'; Sandoval 48'	Report		Stadium: Parque del Este Hockey Stadium

2 August 2026 5/8 Classification	Barbados	0–2	Jamaica	Santo Domingo, Dominican Republic
08:00		Report	Stephenson 5'; Powell 45'	Stadium: Parque del Este Hockey Stadium

4 August 2026 7/8 Classification	Barbados	3–0	Guatemala	Santo Domingo, Dominican Republic
08:00	Toppin 41'; Yarde-Deane 54'; Phillips 55'	Report		Stadium: Parque del Este Hockey Stadium

== See also ==
- Barbados women's national field hockey team
