= Dominican Republic women's national field hockey team =

Hockey Competition

Dominican Republic
- Association: Dominican Republic Hockey Federation (Federación Dominicana de Hockey)
- Confederation: PAHF (Americas)
| Home | Away |

FIH ranking
- Current: 49 (4 August 2026)

Pan American Games
- Appearances: 2 (first in 2003)
- Best result: 7th (2015)
Medal record
Central American and Caribbean Games
| Silver medal – second place | 2014 Veracruz | Team |
Bolivarian Games
| Bronze medal – third place | 2013 Chiclayo | Team |

The Dominican Republic women's national field hockey team represents the Dominican Republic in women's international field hockey competitions. The team won the silver medal at the 2014 Central American and Caribbean Games in Veracruz, Mexico.

== Tournament record ==
=== Pan American Games ===
- 2003 – 8th place
- 2015 – 7th place

=== Central American and Caribbean Games ===
- 2006 – 8th place
- 2010 – 4th place
- 2014 – (silver)
- 2018 – 5th place
- 2023 – 4th place
- 2026 – 5th place

=== Hockey World League ===
- 2014–15 – 33rd place

=== Bolivarian Games ===
- 2013 – (bronze)

== Results and fixtures ==
The following is a list of match results in the last 12 months, as well as any future matches that have been scheduled.

Win Draw Loss Fixture

=== 2026 ===
==== 2026 CAC Games ====
| 26 July 2026 Pool A | Mexico | 2–1 | Dominican Republic | Santo Domingo, Dominican Republic |
| 16:00 | Lacheno 20'; Estrada 57' | Report | Birocho 13' | Stadium: Parque del Este Hockey Stadium |

| 28 July 2026 Pool A | Dominican Republic | 3–6 | Venezuela | Santo Domingo, Dominican Republic |
| 16:00 | Birocho 2'; Ortega 17'; Gonzalez 51' | Report | González 12', 58'; Sanchez 25', 55'; Navas 26', 59' | Stadium: Parque del Este Hockey Stadium |

| 30 July 2026 Pool A | Dominican Republic | 1–1 | Puerto Rico | Santo Domingo, Dominican Republic |
| 16:00 | Gonzalez 52' | Report | Landis 41' | Stadium: Parque del Este Hockey Stadium |

| 1 August 2026 5/8 Classification | Dominican Republic | 1–0 | Jamaica | Santo Domingo, Dominican Republic |
| 08:00 | Oflaherti 43' | Report | | Stadium: Parque del Este Hockey Stadium |

| 3 August 2026 5/6 Classification | Dominican Republic | 2–1 | Puerto Rico | Santo Domingo, Dominican Republic |
| 10:15 | Birocho 27', 51' | Report | Leon 5' | Stadium: Parque del Este Hockey Stadium |

== See also ==
- Dominican Republic men's national field hockey team
