= Kwandwane Browne =

England field hockey player

Kwan Browne
Personal information
- Full name: Kwandwane Mark Browne
- Born: 11 December 1977 (age 48) Belmont, Port of Spain, Trinidad and Tobago

Sport
- Sport: Field hockey
- Position: Defender
- Club: Hampstead & Westminster
Senior career
Years	Team	Caps	Goals
2002–2003	Canterbury	-	-
2003–2006	East Grinstead	-	-
2009–2016	Canterbury	-	-
2016–present	Hampstead & Westminster	-	-
National team
Years	Team	Caps	Goals
1992-2019	Trinidad and Tobago	324	-
Medal record
Men's field hockey
Representing Trinidad and Tobago
- Updated on 28 October 2020

Kwandwane "Kwan" Browne (born 11 December 1977 in Belmont, Trinidad and Tobago) is a Trinidadian field hockey player.

He has represented Trinidad and Tobago internationally at the Commonwealth Games, Pan American Games and Pan American Cup.

Browne has played club hockey for Hampstead and Westminster as a player/coach,Canterbury and East Grinstead.

On 24 September 2019, it was announced that Browne had been appointed as Assistant Coach for the Great Britain national team. In 2024 Browne became Director of hockey at Holcombe where he is the head coach of the men's first xi.
