= Noel Barrionuevo =

Argentine field hockey player

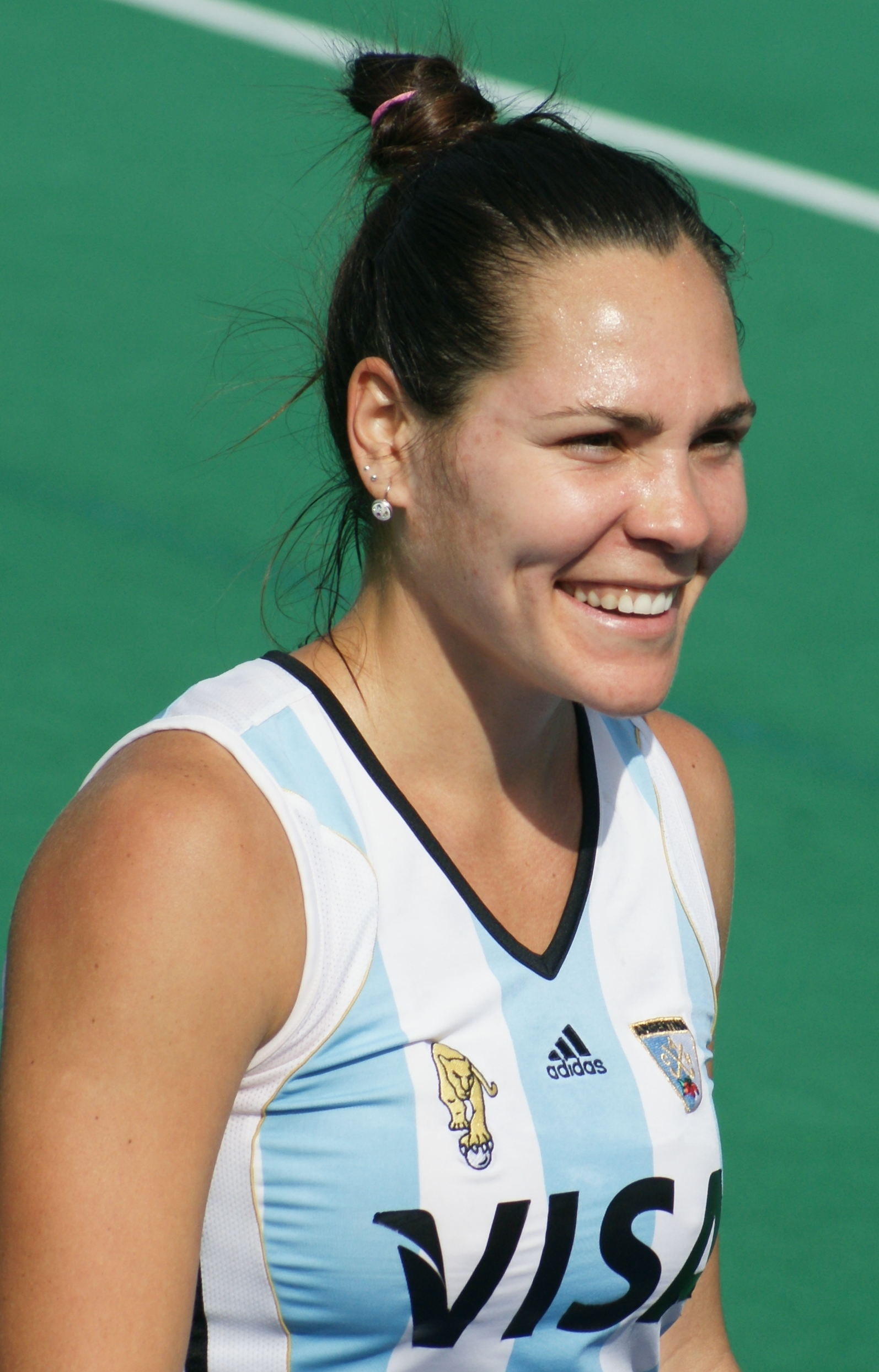
- Barrionuevo in 2009

Personal information
- Full name: María Noel Barrionuevo
- Born: 16 May 1984 (age 42) Martínez, Argentina
- Height: 1.68 m (5 ft 6 in)
- Weight: 66 kg (146 lb)

Sport
- Sport: Field hockey
- Position: Defender
- Club: Club Newman
Senior career
| Years | Team | Caps | Goals |
| – | Banade | - | - |
| –1996 | Universidad Belgrano | - | - |
| 1997–2016 | Ciudad de Buenos Aires | - | - |
| 2019 | Club Newman | - | - |
National team
| Years | Team | Caps | Goals |
| 2005 | Argentina U21 | | - |
| 2006– | Argentina | 320 | (167) |
Medal record
Women's field hockey
Representing Argentina
Summer Olympics
| Silver medal – second place | 2012 London | Team |
| Silver medal – second place | 2020 Tokyo | Team |
| Bronze medal – third place | 2008 Beijing | Team |
World Cup
| Gold medal – first place | 2010 Rosario |
| Bronze medal – third place | 2014 The Hague |
Champions Trophy
| Gold medal – first place | 2008 Mönchengladbach |
| Gold medal – first place | 2009 Sydney |
| Gold medal – first place | 2010 Nottingham |
| Gold medal – first place | 2012 Rosario |
| Gold medal – first place | 2014 Mendoza |
| Gold medal – first place | 2016 London |
| Silver medal – second place | 2007 Quilmes |
| Silver medal – second place | 2011 Amstelveen |
Pan American Games
| Gold medal – first place | 2007 Rio de Janeiro | Team |
| Gold medal – first place | 2019 Lima | Team |
| Silver medal – second place | 2011 Guadalajara | Team |
| Silver medal – second place | 2015 Toronto | Team |
Pan American Cup
| Gold medal – first place | 2009 Hamilton |
| Gold medal – first place | 2013 Mendoza |
| Gold medal – first place | 2017 Lancaster |

María Noel Barrionuevo (born 16 May 1984) is an Argentine field hockey player.

She won the bronze medal at the 2008 Summer Olympics in Beijing, the silver medal at the 2012 Summer Olympics in London, and another silver medal at the 2020 Summer Olympics in Tokyo, with the Argentina women's national field hockey team.

== Career ==
Barrionuevo also won the 2010 World Cup in Rosario, Argentina, six Champions Trophy, the World League 2014–15, the gold medal at the 2007 Pan American Games and three Pan American Cups.

== International goals ==
| No. | Date | Venue | Opponent | Score | Result | Competition |
|---|---|---|---|---|---|---|
| 1. | 14 November 2006 | Buenos Aires, Argentina | Chile | 5–0 | 6–0 | 2006 South American Games |
| 2. | 13 January 2007 | Quilmes, Argentina | Germany | 1–0 | 2–0 | 2007 Women's Hockey Champions Trophy |
| 3. | 14 January 2007 | Quilmes, Argentina | Spain | 2–0 | 4–1 | 2007 Women's Hockey Champions Trophy |
| 4. | 14 January 2007 | Quilmes, Argentina | Spain | 4–1 | 4–1 | 2007 Women's Hockey Champions Trophy |
| 5. | 18 January 2007 | Quilmes, Argentina | Japan | 1–0 | 3–1 | 2007 Women's Hockey Champions Trophy |
| 6. | 20 January 2007 | Quilmes, Argentina | Australia | 1–0 | 3–0 | 2007 Women's Hockey Champions Trophy |
| 7. | 15 July 2007 | Rio de Janeiro, Brazil | Brazil | 4–0 | 21–0 | 2007 Pan American Games |
| 8. | 17 July 2007 | Rio de Janeiro, Brazil | Uruguay | 2–0 | 6–0 | 2007 Pan American Games |
| 9. | 17 July 2007 | Rio de Janeiro, Brazil | Uruguay | 6–0 | 6–0 | 2007 Pan American Games |
| 10. | 21 July 2007 | Rio de Janeiro, Brazil | Netherlands Antilles | 3–0 | 3–0 | 2007 Pan American Games |
| 11. | 17 May 2008 | Mönchengladbach, Germany | China | 1–1 | 1–2 | 2008 Women's Hockey Champions Trophy |
| 12. | 20 May 2008 | Mönchengladbach, Germany | Australia | 1–0 | 2–1 | 2008 Women's Hockey Champions Trophy |
| 13. | 22 August 2008 | Beijing, China | Germany | 3–1 | 3–1 | 2008 Summer Olympics |
| 14. | 7 February 2009 | Hamilton, Bermuda | Trinidad and Tobago | 2–0 | 7–1 | 2009 Women's Pan American Cup |
| 15. | 7 February 2009 | Hamilton, Bermuda | Trinidad and Tobago | 3–1 | 7–1 | 2009 Women's Pan American Cup |
| 16. | 7 February 2009 | Hamilton, Bermuda | Trinidad and Tobago | 6–1 | 7–1 | 2009 Women's Pan American Cup |
| 17. | 8 February 2009 | Hamilton, Bermuda | Canada | 1–0 | 4–0 | 2009 Women's Pan American Cup |
| 18. | 8 February 2009 | Hamilton, Bermuda | Canada | 2–0 | 4–0 | 2009 Women's Pan American Cup |
| 19. | 11 February 2009 | Hamilton, Bermuda | Bermuda | 4–0 | 25–0 | 2009 Women's Pan American Cup |
| 20. | 11 February 2009 | Hamilton, Bermuda | Bermuda | 13–0 | 25–0 | 2009 Women's Pan American Cup |
| 21. | 11 February 2009 | Hamilton, Bermuda | Bermuda | 15–0 | 25–0 | 2009 Women's Pan American Cup |
| 22. | 11 February 2009 | Hamilton, Bermuda | Bermuda | 20–0 | 25–0 | 2009 Women's Pan American Cup |
| 23. | 11 February 2009 | Hamilton, Bermuda | Bermuda | 21–0 | 25–0 | 2009 Women's Pan American Cup |
| 24. | 11 July 2009 | Sydney, Australia | China | 2–1 | 2–1 | 2009 Women's Hockey Champions Trophy |
| 25. | 15 July 2009 | Sydney, Australia | England | 3–1 | 3–1 | 2009 Women's Hockey Champions Trophy |
| 26. | 16 July 2009 | Sydney, Australia | Netherlands | 1–0 | 2–2 | 2009 Women's Hockey Champions Trophy |
| 27. | 16 July 2009 | Sydney, Australia | Netherlands | 2–2 | 2–2 | 2009 Women's Hockey Champions Trophy |
| 28. | 11 October 2009 | Mendoza, Argentina | Australia | 1–0 | 2–3 | Test match |
| 29. | 14 October 2009 | Mendoza, Argentina | Australia | 1–0 | 2–0 | Test match |
| 30. | 24 March 2010 | Townsville, Australia | Australia | 2–1 | 2–1 | Test match |
| 31. | 25 March 2010 | Townsville, Australia | Australia | 1–0 | 2–1 | Test match |
| 32. | 25 March 2010 | Townsville, Australia | Australia | 2–0 | 2–1 | Test match |
| 33. | 10 July 2010 | Nottingham, England | England | 1–2 | 1–2 | 2010 Women's Hockey Champions Trophy |
| 34. | 11 July 2010 | Nottingham, England | Germany | 2–1 | 2–2 | 2010 Women's Hockey Champions Trophy |
| 35. | 13 July 2010 | Nottingham, England | New Zealand | 2–0 | 4–0 | 2010 Women's Hockey Champions Trophy |
| 36. | 15 July 2010 | Nottingham, England | Netherlands | 1–0 | 4–2 | 2010 Women's Hockey Champions Trophy |
| 37. | 17 July 2010 | Nottingham, England | China | 4–3 | 4–3 | 2010 Women's Hockey Champions Trophy |
| 38. | 18 July 2010 | Nottingham, England | Netherlands | 1–0 | 4–2 | 2010 Women's Hockey Champions Trophy |
| 39. | 18 July 2010 | Nottingham, England | Netherlands | 3–1 | 4–2 | 2010 Women's Hockey Champions Trophy |
| 40. | 18 July 2010 | Nottingham, England | Netherlands | 4–2 | 4–2 | 2010 Women's Hockey Champions Trophy |
| 41. | 29 August 2010 | Rosario, Argentina | South Africa | 1–0 | 5–2 | 2010 Women's Hockey World Cup |
| 42. | 3 September 2010 | Rosario, Argentina | Spain | 1–0 | 4–0 | 2010 Women's Hockey World Cup |
| 43. | 3 September 2010 | Rosario, Argentina | Spain | 4–0 | 4–0 | 2010 Women's Hockey World Cup |
| 44. | 4 September 2010 | Rosario, Argentina | China | 1–0 | 2–0 | 2010 Women's Hockey World Cup |
| 45. | 6 September 2010 | Rosario, Argentina | England | 1–0 | 2–0 | 2010 Women's Hockey World Cup |
| 46. | 11 September 2010 | Rosario, Argentina | Netherlands | 2–0 | 3–1 | 2010 Women's Hockey World Cup |
| 47. | 9 February 2011 | Mendoza, Argentina | United States | 1–0 | 5–0 | 2011 Women's Four Nations Hockey Tournament |
| 48. | 10 February 2011 | Mendoza, Argentina | Germany | 1–0 | 2–0 | 2011 Women's Four Nations Hockey Tournament |
| 49. | 12 February 2011 | Mendoza, Argentina | Australia | 1–1 | 1–1 | 2011 Women's Four Nations Hockey Tournament |
| 50. | 17 February 2011 | Rosario, Argentina | United States | 4–0 | 4–1 | 2011 Women's Four Nations Hockey Tournament |
| 51. | 19 February 2011 | Rosario, Argentina | Germany | 1–0 | 3–2 | 2011 Women's Four Nations Hockey Tournament |
| 52. | 20 February 2011 | Rosario, Argentina | United States | 1–1 | 3–2 | 2011 Women's Four Nations Hockey Tournament |
| 53. | 20 February 2011 | Rosario, Argentina | United States | 2–1 | 3–2 | 2011 Women's Four Nations Hockey Tournament |
| 54. | 5 April 2011 | Canberra, Australia | Australia | 2–2 | 3–2 | Test match |
| 55. | 16 June 2011 | Berlin, Germany | Australia | 3–3 | 3–3 | 2011 Women's Four Nations Cup |
| 56. | 26 June 2011 | Amstelveen, Netherlands | China | 1–0 | 4–1 | 2011 Women's Hockey Champions Trophy |
| 57. | 19 October 2011 | Guadalajara, Mexico | Trinidad and Tobago | 4–0 | 11–0 | 2011 Pan American Games |
| 58. | 19 October 2011 | Guadalajara, Mexico | Trinidad and Tobago | 7–0 | 11–0 | 2011 Pan American Games |
| 59. | 19 October 2011 | Guadalajara, Mexico | Trinidad and Tobago | 8–0 | 11–0 | 2011 Pan American Games |
| 60. | 19 October 2011 | Guadalajara, Mexico | Trinidad and Tobago | 9–0 | 11–0 | 2011 Pan American Games |
| 61. | 21 October 2011 | Guadalajara, Mexico | Canada | 5–3 | 7–3 | 2011 Pan American Games |
| 62. | 21 October 2011 | Guadalajara, Mexico | Canada | 6–3 | 7–3 | 2011 Pan American Games |
| 63. | 23 October 2011 | Guadalajara, Mexico | Barbados | 3–0 | 19–0 | 2011 Pan American Games |
| 64. | 23 October 2011 | Guadalajara, Mexico | Barbados | 19–0 | 19–0 | 2011 Pan American Games |
| 65. | 28 October 2011 | Guadalajara, Mexico | United States | 1–2 | 2–4 | 2011 Pan American Games |
| 66. | 28 October 2011 | Guadalajara, Mexico | United States | 2–3 | 2–4 | 2011 Pan American Games |
| 67. | 18 January 2012 | Córdoba, Argentina | New Zealand | 3–2 | 7–3 | 2012 Women's Four Nations Hockey Tournament |
| 68. | 18 January 2012 | Córdoba, Argentina | New Zealand | 4–3 | 7–3 | 2012 Women's Four Nations Hockey Tournament |
| 69. | 18 January 2012 | Córdoba, Argentina | New Zealand | 5–3 | 7–3 | 2012 Women's Four Nations Hockey Tournament |
| 70. | 18 January 2012 | Córdoba, Argentina | New Zealand | 6–3 | 7–3 | 2012 Women's Four Nations Hockey Tournament |
| 71. | 21 January 2012 | Córdoba, Argentina | South Korea | 1–4 | 1–5 | 2012 Women's Four Nations Hockey Tournament |
| 72. | 29 January 2012 | Rosario, Argentina | Germany | 2–0 | 4–2 | 2012 Women's Hockey Champions Trophy |
| 73. | 31 January 2012 | Rosario, Argentina | South Korea | 1–1 | 2–2 | 2012 Women's Hockey Champions Trophy |
| 74. | 2 February 2012 | Rosario, Argentina | China | 1–0 | 3–2 | 2012 Women's Hockey Champions Trophy |
| 75. | 4 February 2012 | Rosario, Argentina | Netherlands | 2–2 | 2–2 (a.e.t.) (2–0 p) | 2012 Women's Hockey Champions Trophy |
| 76. | 29 July 2012 | London, United Kingdom | South Africa | 6–1 | 7–1 | 2012 Summer Olympics |
| 77. | 8 August 2012 | London, United Kingdom | Great Britain | 1–0 | 2–1 | 2012 Summer Olympics |
| 78. | 21 September 2013 | Mendoza, Argentina | Trinidad and Tobago | 10–0 | 12–0 | 2013 Women's Pan American Cup |
| 79. | 22 September 2013 | Mendoza, Argentina | Canada | 5–0 | 6–0 | 2013 Women's Pan American Cup |
| 80. | 22 September 2013 | Mendoza, Argentina | Canada | 6–0 | 6–0 | 2013 Women's Pan American Cup |
| 81. | 24 September 2013 | Mendoza, Argentina | Guyana | 9–0 | 22–0 | 2013 Women's Pan American Cup |
| 82. | 24 September 2013 | Mendoza, Argentina | Guyana | 22–0 | 22–0 | 2013 Women's Pan American Cup |
| 83. | 12 October 2013 | Perth, Australia | Australia | 1–0 | 1–0 | Test match |
| 84. | 5 December 2013 | San Miguel de Tucumán, Argentina | South Korea | 2–1 | 3–1 | 2012–13 Women's FIH Hockey World League Final |
| 85. | 1 June 2014 | The Hague, Netherlands | South Africa | 3–0 | 4–1 | 2014 Women's Hockey World Cup |
| 86. | 6 June 2014 | The Hague, Netherlands | Germany | 2–0 | 3–0 | 2014 Women's Hockey World Cup |
| 87. | 4 December 2014 | Mendoza, Argentina | China | 1–0 | 7–2 | 2014 Women's Hockey Champions Trophy |
| 88. | 4 December 2014 | Mendoza, Argentina | China | 7–1 | 7–2 | 2014 Women's Hockey Champions Trophy |
| 89. | 18 April 2015 | Hastings, New Zealand | Japan | 2–1 | 3–2 | 2015 Hawke's Bay Cup |
| 90. | 11 June 2015 | Valencia, Spain | Canada | 3–0 | 6–0 | 2014–15 Women's FIH Hockey World League Semifinals |
| 91. | 18 June 2015 | Valencia, Spain | United States | 3–0 | 3–0 | 2014–15 Women's FIH Hockey World League Semifinals |
| 92. | 13 July 2015 | Toronto, Canada | Mexico | 3–0 | 9–0 | 2015 Pan American Games |
| 93. | 13 July 2015 | Toronto, Canada | Mexico | 7–0 | 9–0 | 2015 Pan American Games |
| 94. | 15 July 2015 | Toronto, Canada | Canada | 1–0 | 5–0 | 2015 Pan American Games |
| 95. | 17 July 2015 | Toronto, Canada | Dominican Republic | 1–0 | 12–0 | 2015 Pan American Games |
| 96. | 17 July 2015 | Toronto, Canada | Dominican Republic | 2–0 | 12–0 | 2015 Pan American Games |
| 97. | 20 July 2015 | Toronto, Canada | Cuba | 2–0 | 10–0 | 2015 Pan American Games |
| 98. | 20 July 2015 | Toronto, Canada | Cuba | 5–0 | 10–0 | 2015 Pan American Games |
| 99. | 20 July 2015 | Toronto, Canada | Cuba | 8–0 | 10–0 | 2015 Pan American Games |
| 100. | 20 July 2015 | Toronto, Canada | Cuba | 9–0 | 10–0 | 2015 Pan American Games |
| 101. | 8 December 2015 | Rosario, Argentina | China | 1–1 | 1–3 | 2014–15 Women's FIH Hockey World League Final |
| 102. | 13 December 2015 | Rosario, Argentina | New Zealand | 4–1 | 5–1 | 2014–15 Women's FIH Hockey World League Final |
| 103. | 8 August 2016 | Rio de Janeiro, Brazil | Japan | 1–0 | 4–0 | 2016 Summer Olympics |
| 104. | 8 August 2016 | Rio de Janeiro, Brazil | Japan | 2–0 | 4–0 | 2016 Summer Olympics |
| 105. | 7 August 2017 | Lancaster, United States | Uruguay | 3–0 | 6–0 | 2017 Women's Pan American Cup |
| 106. | 7 August 2017 | Lancaster, United States | Uruguay | 6–0 | 6–0 | 2017 Women's Pan American Cup |
| 107. | 11 August 2017 | Lancaster, United States | Canada | 2–0 | 4–1 | 2017 Women's Pan American Cup |
| 108. | 11 August 2017 | Lancaster, United States | Canada | 4–1 | 4–1 | 2017 Women's Pan American Cup |
| 109. | 13 August 2017 | Lancaster, United States | Chile | 4–1 | 4–1 | 2017 Women's Pan American Cup |
| 110. | 31 July 2019 | Lima, Peru | Canada | 3–0 | 3–0 | 2019 Pan American Games |
| 111. | 2 August 2019 | Lima, Peru | Cuba | 3–0 | 13–1 | 2019 Pan American Games |
| 112. | 2 August 2019 | Lima, Peru | Cuba | 5–0 | 13–1 | 2019 Pan American Games |
| 113. | 2 August 2019 | Lima, Peru | Cuba | 12–1 | 13–1 | 2019 Pan American Games |
| 114. | 2 August 2019 | Lima, Peru | Cuba | 13–1 | 13–1 | 2019 Pan American Games |
| 183. | 26 July 2021 | Tokyo, Japan | Spain | 3–0 | 3–0 | 2020 Summer Olympics |
| 184. | 4 August 2021 | Tokyo, Japan | India | 1–1 | 2–1 | 2020 Summer Olympics |
| 185. | 4 August 2021 | Tokyo, Japan | India | 2–1 | 2–1 | 2020 Summer Olympics |
