= Women's Pan American Challenge =

- Most recent season or competition: 2024 Women's Pan American Challenge
- Sport: Field hockey
- Founded: 2011; 15 years ago
- First season: 2011
- No. of teams: 4
- Confederation: PAHF (Americas)
- Most recent champion: Mexico (1st title) (2024)
- Most titles: Brazil; Mexico; Peru; Uruguay (1 title each)

The Women's Pan American Challenge is a quadrennial international women's field hockey competition in the Americas organized by the Pan American Hockey Federation. The tournament serves as the qualification tournament for the next Women's Pan American Cup.

The tournament was created in 2011 when the PAHF created a tiered system with the Pan American Challenge as the second tier below the Pan American Cup. The first edition was held in Rio de Janeiro, Brazil.

== Results ==
Year	Host	Final			Third place match			Number of teams
Year	Host	Winner	Score	Runner-up	Third place	Score	Fourth place	Number of teams
2011; Details	Rio de Janeiro, Brazil	Uruguay	6–0	Guyana	Brazil	2–1	Paraguay	5
2015; Details	Chiclayo, Peru	Brazil	3–1	Barbados	Peru	2–1	Puerto Rico	5
2021; Details	Lima, Peru	Peru	2–0	Trinidad and Tobago	Paraguay	3–1	Brazil	4
2024; Details	Hamilton, Bermuda	Mexico	2–2 (4–2 s.o.)	Paraguay	Guyana	2–1	Bermuda	5

=== Summary ===
Team	Winners	Runners-up	Third place	Fourth place
Brazil	1 (2015)		1 (2011*)	1 (2021)
Peru	1 (2021*)		1 (2015*)	
Uruguay	1 (2011)			
Mexico	1 (2024)			
Paraguay		1 (2024)	1 (2021)	1 (2011)
Guyana		1 (2011)	1 (2024)	
Barbados		1 (2015)		
Trinidad and Tobago		1 (2021)		
Puerto Rico				1 (2015)
Bermuda				1 (2024*)

* = hosts

=== Team appearances ===
Nation	(Brazil) 2011	(Peru) 2015	(Peru) 2021	(Bermuda) 2024	Total
Barbados	–	2nd	–	–	1
Bermuda	5th	–	–	4th	2
Brazil	3rd	1st	4th	5th	4
Guyana	2nd	–	–	3rd	2
Mexico	–	–	–	1st	1
Panama	–	5th	–	–	1
Paraguay	4th	–	3rd	2nd	3
Peru	–	3rd	1st	WD	2
Puerto Rico	–	4th	–	–	1
Trinidad and Tobago	–	–	2nd	–	1
Uruguay	1st	–	–	–	1
Total	5	5	4	6	

== See also ==
- Men's Pan American Challenge
- Women's Pan American Cup
