= Trinidad and Tobago national field hockey team =

Trinidad and Tobago national field hockey team may refer to:

- Trinidad and Tobago men's national field hockey team
- Trinidad and Tobago women's national field hockey team
