= Mexico national field hockey team =

Mexico national field hockey team may refer to:

- Mexico men's national field hockey team
- Mexico women's national field hockey team
