= Cuba men's national field hockey team =

Cuba
- Association: Cuban Hockey Federation
- Confederation: PAHF (Americas)
- Head Coach: Alain Bardaji
- Manager: Nelson Ginorio Vega
- Captain: Roger Aguilera

FIH ranking
- Current: 37 ▲6 (5 August 2026)
- Highest: 18 (2003)
- Lowest: 70 (January 2019)

Olympic Games
- Appearances: 1 (first in 1980)
- Best result: 5th (1980)

World Cup
- Appearances: 1 (first in 2002)
- Best result: 16th (2002)

Pan American Games
- Appearances: 10 (first in 1979)
- Best result: 3rd (1999, 2002)

Pan American Cup
- Appearances: 1 (first in 2000)
- Best result: 1st (2000)
Medal record
Event	1st	2nd	3rd
Pan American Games	0	0	2
Pan American Cup	1	0	0
CAC Games	9	0	1
Total	10	0	3
Pan American Games
Bronze medal – third place	1999 Winnipeg	Team
Bronze medal – third place	2003 Santo Domingo	Team
Pan American Cup
Gold medal – first place	2000 Havana	
Central American and Caribbean Games
Gold medal – first place	1982 Havana	Team
Gold medal – first place	1986 Santiago	Team
Gold medal – first place	1990 Mexico City	Team
Gold medal – first place	1993 Ponce	Team
Gold medal – first place	1998 Caracas	Team
Gold medal – first place	2006 Santo Domingo	Team
Gold medal – first place	2014 Veracruz	Team
Gold medal – first place	2018 Barranquilla	Team
Gold medal – first place	2026 Santo Domingo	Team
Bronze medal – third place	2023 Santo Domingo	Team

The Cuba men's national field hockey team represent Cuba in international field hockey competitions.

== Tournament record ==
=== Summer Olympics ===
- 1980 – 5th place

=== World Cup ===
- 2002 – 16th place

=== Pan American Games ===
- 1979 – 4th place
- 1983 – 6th place
- 1991 – 6th place
- 1995 – 4th place
- 1999 – (bronze)
- 2003 – (bronze)
- 2007 – 5th place
- 2011 – 4th place
- 2015 – 8th place
- 2019 – 6th place

=== Pan American Cup ===
- 2000 – (gold)
- 2004 – Withdrew

=== Central American and Caribbean Games ===
- 1982 – (gold)
- 1986 – (gold)
- 1990 – (gold)
- 1993 – (gold)
- 1998 – (gold)
- 2006 – (gold)
- 2014 – (gold)
- 2018 – (gold)
- 2023 – (bronze)
- 2026 – (gold)

=== Friendship Games ===
- 1984 – 5th place

=== Alba Games ===
- 2007 – (gold)

== Results and fixtures ==
The following is a list of match results in the last 12 months, as well as any future matches that have been scheduled.

Win Draw Loss Fixture

=== 2026 ===
==== 2026 CAC Games ====
27 July 2026 Pool B	Cuba	1–0	Jamaica	Santo Domingo, Dominican Republic
14:00	Calderón 17'	Report		Stadium: Parque del Este Hockey Stadium

29 July 2026 Pool B	Cuba	4–0	Venezuela	Santo Domingo, Dominican Republic
14:00	Calderón 5', 23'; Neninger 31', 38'	Report		Stadium: Parque del Este Hockey Stadium

31 July 2026 Pool B	Dominican Republic	5–7	Cuba	Santo Domingo, Dominican Republic
16:00	Cabrera 9'; Anton 17'; Moncion 28', 51'; Nivar 43'	Report	Batista 2'; Viera 3'; Calderón 8', 22', 57'; Neninger 38'; Echevarría 51'	Stadium: Parque del Este Hockey Stadium

2 August 2026 Semi final	Cuba	3–2	Mexico	Santo Domingo, Dominican Republic
14:45	Batista 26', 49'; Calderón 50'	Report	Gomez 8'; Sandoval 32'	Stadium: Parque del Este Hockey Stadium

4 August 2026 Gold medal match	Trinidad and Tobago	2–2 (1–2 p)	Cuba	Santo Domingo, Dominican Republic
14:45	Pierre 45'; Francis 58'	Report	Calderón 13'; Sánchez 40'	Stadium: Parque del Este Hockey Stadium
	Penalties
	Siu Butt (penalty shoot-out missed); Marcano (penalty shoot-out scored); Pierre (penalty shoot-out missed); J. Daniel (penalty shoot-out missed); S. Daniel (penalty shoot-out missed)		(penalty shoot-out scored) Calderón; (penalty shoot-out missed) Mena; (penalty shoot-out missed) Batista; (penalty shoot-out missed) Echevarría; (penalty shoot-out scored) Calderón

== See also ==
- Cuba women's national field hockey team
