= 2021 Women's Pan American Challenge =

Tournament details
- Host country: Peru
- City: Lima
- Dates: 26 September – 2 October
- Teams: 4 (from 1 confederation)
- Venue: Complejo Panamericano de Villa Maria del Triunfo

Final positions
- Champions: Peru (1st title)
- Runner-up: Trinidad and Tobago
- Third place: Paraguay

Tournament statistics
- Matches played: 10
- Goals scored: 24 (2.4 per match)
- Top scorer: (Peru) Marina Montes (4 goals)

The 2021 Women's Pan American Challenge was the third edition of the Women's Pan American Challenge, the quadrennial qualification tournament for the Women's Pan American Cup organized by the Pan American Hockey Federation.

The tournament was held alongside the men's tournament in Lima, Peru from 26 September to 2 October 2021. The tournament was originally scheduled to be held from 27 June to 5 July 2020. Due to the COVID-19 pandemic, the tournament was postponed and on 4 February 2021 the current dates were announced. The finalists qualified for the 2022 Women's Pan American Cup.

== Preliminary round ==
=== Pool ===
Pos	Team	Pld	W	D	L	GF	GA	GD	Pts
1	Peru (H)	3	2	0	1	3	2	+1	6
2	Trinidad and Tobago	3	1	2	0	4	3	+1	5
3	Paraguay	3	1	1	1	5	5	0	4
4	Brazil	3	0	1	2	2	4	−2	1

Source: FIH
Rules for classification: 1) points; 2) matches won; 3) goal difference; 4) goals for; 5) head-to-head result; 6) field goals for.
(H) Hosts

=== Matches ===
26 September 2021
11:00

Brazil	1–2	Paraguay
Queiroz 25'	Report	Samudio 23'; Acuna 39'

Umpires:
Rodrigo Rivadeneira (PER)
Daniel Gonzalez Alvizuri (PER)

26 September 2021
13:00

Peru	0–1	Trinidad and Tobago
	Report	Govia 60'

Umpires:
Oscar Lares (MEX)
Victoria Pazos (PAR)

28 September 2021
11:00

Trinidad and Tobago	2–2	Paraguay
Hingh 41'; Henry 60'	Report	Roa 45'; Duarte 54'

Umpires:
Rodrigo Rivadeneira (PER)
Reinier Diaz (CUB)

28 September 2021
13:00

Brazil	0–1	Peru
	Report	M. Montes 4'

Umpires:
Victoria Pazos (PAR)
Luis Cardona (GUA)

29 September 2021
11:00

Trinidad and Tobago	1–1	Brazil
Henry 46'	Report	Fedrizzi 32'

Umpires:
Victoria {azos (PAR)
Rodrigo Rivadeneira (PER)

29 September 2021
13:00

Peru	2–1	Paraguay
M. Montes 9'; V. Montes 45+'	Report	Catebra 43'

Umpires:
Mary Driscoll (USA)
Luis Cardona (GUA)

== Classification round ==
=== Bracket ===
Semi-finals
1 October
Peru	2
Brazil	0
1 October
Paraguay	2 (3)
Trinidad and Tobago (s.o.)	2 (4)

Final
2 October
Peru	2
Trinidad and Tobago	0
Third place
2 October
Brazil	1
Paraguay	3

=== Semi-finals ===
1 October 2021
11:00

Peru	2–0	Brazil
Moccagatta 10'; M. Montes 37'	Report

Umpires:
Oscar Lares (MEX)
Mary Driscoll (USA)

1 October 2021
13:00

Paraguay	1–1	Trinidad and Tobago
Catebra 51'	Report	Sh. de Freitas 37'
Penalties
Zambrini (penalty shoot-out scored); Sanchez (penalty shoot-out scored); Samudio (penalty shoot-out missed); Cacace (penalty shoot-out missed); Romero (penalty shoot-out scored); Cacace (penalty shoot-out missed)	3–4	(penalty shoot-out scored) Sa. de Freitas; (penalty shoot-out missed) Olton; (penalty shoot-out scored) Govia; (penalty shoot-out scored) Henry; (penalty shoot-out missed) Hingh; (penalty shoot-out scored) Govia

Umpires:
Rodrigo Rivadeneira (PER)
Reinier Diaz (CUB)

=== Third place game ===
2 October 2021
11:00

Brazil	1–3	Paraguay
Schlemper 50'	Report	Samudio 4'; Sanchez 24'; Catebra 55'

Umpires:
Daniel Gonzalez Alvizuri (PER)
Rodrigo Rivadeneira (PER)

=== Final ===
2 October 2021
15:00

Peru	2–0	Trinidad and Tobago
Alonso 26'; M.Montes 44'	Report

Umpires:
Oscar Lares (MEX)
Luis Cardona (GUA)

== Statistics ==
=== Final standings ===
Pos	Team	Qualification
1	Peru (H)	2022 Pan American Cup
2	Trinidad and Tobago	2022 Pan American Cup
3	Paraguay	
4	Brazil	

Source: FIH
(H) Host

=== Goalscorers ===
There were 24 goals scored in 10 matches, for an average of 2.4 goals per match.

4 goals

- (Peru) Marina Montes

3 goals

- (Paraguay) María Catebra

2 goals

- (Paraguay) Ana Samudio
- (Trinidad and Tobago) Zene Henry

1 goal

- (Brazil) Mayara Fedrizzi
- (Brazil) Alice Queiroz
- (Brazil) Gabriela Schlemper
- (Paraguay) Lilian Acuna
- (Paraguay) Astrid Duarte
- (Paraguay) Veronica Roa
- (Paraguay) Agustina Sanchez
- (Peru) Solange Alonso
- (Peru) Ana Moccagatta
- (Peru) Victoria Montes
- (Trinidad and Tobago) Shaniah de Freitas
- (Trinidad and Tobago) Brianna Govia
- (Trinidad and Tobago) Brittney Hingh

Source: FIH

== See also ==
- 2021 Men's Pan American Challenge
