= 2009 Women's Pan American Cup =

Tournament details
- Host country: Bermuda
- City: Hamilton
- Teams: 8 (from 1 confederation)
- Venue: National Sports Center

Final positions
- Champions: Argentina (3rd title)
- Runner-up: United States
- Third place: Chile

Tournament statistics
- Matches played: 20
- Goals scored: 125 (6.25 per match)
- Top scorer: (Argentina) Noel Barrionuevo (10 goals)
- Best player: (Argentina) Carla Rebecchi

The 2009 Women's Pan American Cup was the 3rd edition of the Women's Pan American Cup, the quadrennial international women's field hockey championship of the Americas organised by the Pan American Hockey Federation. It was held between 7 and 15 February 2009 in Hamilton, Bermuda.

The tournament doubled as the qualifier to the 2010 World Cup to be held in Rosario, Argentina. The winner would qualify directly while teams ranked between second and sixth would have the chance to obtain one of three berths at the World Cup Qualifiers. The top six teams also qualified for the 2013 Women's Pan American Cup.

Argentina won the tournament for the third consecutive time after defeating the United States 7–6 in the final on penalty strokes after a 2–2 draw. The United States made a protest against the result of the sudden death penalty stroke alleging irregularities before the shot performed by Noel Barrionuevo but were overruled by the tournament director. After submitting an appeal to the said decision, it was overruled by the Jury of Appeal. As the protest was made right after the match finished, only the bronze medals were given to the players. The trophy and gold and silver medals were awarded at the airport, just before both teams took their flights returning to their countries.

As future hosts of the 2010 World Cup, Argentina had a berth to participate at it regardless of their ranking in this tournament. By winning it, the European confederation received an extra quota.

== Umpires ==
Below are the 10 umpires appointed by the Pan American Hockey Federation:

- Frances Block (ENG)
- Arely Castellanos (MEX)
- Jean Duncan (SCO)
- Amy Hassick (USA)
- Kang Hyun-young (KOR)
- Ayanna McClean (TRI)
- Irene Presenqui (ARG)
- Emma Simmons (BER)
- Wendy Stewart (CAN)
- Claudia Videla (CHI)

== Results ==
All times are Atlantic Standard Time (UTC−04:00)

=== First round ===
==== Pool A ====
Team	Pld	W	D	L	GF	GA	GD	Pts
Argentina	3	3	0	0	36	1	+35	9
Trinidad and Tobago	3	2	0	1	11	9	+2	6
Canada	3	1	0	2	12	7	+5	3
Bermuda	3	0	0	3	0	42	−42	0

Advanced to semifinals

7 February 2009
14:00

Argentina	7–1	Trinidad and Tobago
Luchetti 6', 29'; Barrionuevo 14', 24', 68'; Sruoga 49', 70'	Report	Wynne 20'

Umpires:
Wendy Stewart (CAN)
Amy Hassick (USA)

7 February 2009
16:00

Canada	10–0	Bermuda
Rushton 10'; Nesbitt 15', 35', 55'; Roemer 22'; O'Hara 31'; Walkey 36'; Jameson 39'; Michaluk 48'; Culley 66'	Report

Umpires:
Claudia Videla (CHI)
Kang Hyun-Young (KOR)

8 February 2009
14:30

Trinidad and Tobago	7–0	Bermuda
Siu Butt 24', 45'; Wynne 29'; Aming 52', 55', 67'; James 60'	Report

Umpires:
Arely Castellanos (MEX)
Irene Presenqui (ARG)

8 February 2009
16:30

Argentina	4–0	Canada
Barrionuevo 13', 18'; Sruoga 50'; Rojas 68'	Report

Umpires:
Jean Duncan (SCO)
Frances Block (ENG)

11 February 2009
16:00

Trinidad and Tobago	3–2	Canada
Siu Butt 7', 62'; Layne 24'	Report	Walkey 45', 65'

Umpires:
Arely Castellanos (MEX)
Jean Duncan (SCO)

11 February 2009
18:00

Argentina	25–0	Bermuda
Villalba 4'; Rojas 7', 61'; Kañevsky 9'; Barrionuevo 14', 43', 46', 55', 58'; Rebecchi 17', 29', 47', 52', 53', 67'; Merino 20'; Abente 32', 33', 38', 45', 60'; Luchetti 35'; Zuloaga 39'; Arrondo 50'; D'Elía 63'	Report

Umpires:
Ayanna McLean (TRI)
Frances Block (ENG)

==== Pool B ====
Team	Pld	W	D	L	GF	GA	GD	Pts
United States	3	3	0	0	18	0	+18	9
Chile	3	2	0	1	8	3	+5	6
Mexico	3	1	0	2	5	13	−8	3
Jamaica	3	0	0	3	1	16	−15	0

Advanced to semifinals

7 February 2009
09:30

United States	10–0	Jamaica
Crandall 10', 25'; Smith 18'; Gey 26'; Rizzo 34'; S. Dawson 41'; R. Dawson 45', 53'; Lingo 56'; Reinprecht 68'	Report

Umpires:
Jean Duncan (SCO)
Irene Presenqui (ARG)

7 February 2009
11:30

Chile	6–1	Mexico
D. Infante 19', 30'; Villagra 21'; D. Caram 29'; Thiermann 68'; Wilson 69'	Report	Cota Felipe 70'

Umpires:
Frances Block (ENG)
Emma Simmons (BER)

8 February 2009
10:30

Jamaica	1–4	Mexico
Grant 31'	Report	Castillo Marín 35', 65'; Navarro Hernández 57'; Paredes Rodríguez 60'

Umpires:
Ayanna McClean (TRI)
Claudia Videla (CHI)

8 February 2009
12:30

United States	2–0	Chile
Smith 21'; Lingo 34'	Report

Umpires:
Wendy Stewart (CAN)
Kang Hyun-Young (KOR)

10 February 2009
16:00

Jamaica	0–2	Chile
	Report	D. Infante 17'; D. Caram 18'

Umpires:
Amy Hassick (USA)
Arely Castellanos (MEX)

10 February 2009
18:00

United States	6–0	Mexico
Snow 3', 47', 55'; Powley 27'; R. Dawson 43'; Smith 52'	Report

Umpires:
Emma Simmons (BER)
Irene Presenqui (ARG)

=== Fifth to eighth place classification ===
Cross-overs
13 February
Canada (a.e.t.)	1
Jamaica	0
13 February
Bermuda	0
Mexico	5

Fifth place
15 February
Canada	10
Mexico	1
Seventh place
15 February
Jamaica	2
Bermuda	0

==== Cross-overs ====
13 February 2009
15:30

Canada	1–0 (a.e.t.)	Jamaica
Jameson 80'	Report

Umpires:
Arely Castellanos (MEX)
Kang Hyun-Young (KOR)

13 February 2009
18:00

Bermuda	0–5	Mexico
	Report	Paredes Rodríguez 11'; Flores Hernández 24'; Castillo Marín 28', 32'; Navarro Hernández 56'

Umpires:
Ayanna McClean (TRI)
Claudia Videla (CHI)

==== Seventh and eighth place ====
15 February 2009
09:00

Jamaica	2–0	Bermuda
Reid 28'; Russell 38'	Report

Umpires:
Claudia Videla (CHI)
Kang Hyun-Young (KOR)

==== Fifth and sixth place ====
15 February 2009
11:00

Canada	10–1	Mexico
Baker 4'; O'Hara 10'; Culley 13', 17', 26', 40'; Wise 23'; Elmitt 30', 35+'; Walkey 65'	Report	Navarro Hernández 56'

Umpires:
Emma Simmons (BER)
Amy Hassick (USA)

=== First to fourth place classification ===
Semi-finals
14 February
Argentina	1
Chile	0
14 February
Trinidad and Tobago	0
United States	7

Final
15 February
Argentina (p.s.)	2 (7)
United States	2 (6)
Third place
15 February
Chile	2
Trinidad and Tobago	1

==== Semi-finals ====
14 February 2009
12:00

Argentina	1–0	Chile
Sruoga 56'	Report

Umpires:
Wendy Stewart (CAN)
Amy Hassick (USA)

14 February 2009
14:30

Trinidad and Tobago	0–7	United States
	Report	Snow 6'; Reinprecht 12'; Lingo 37', 59'; Bashore 44'; S. Dawson 64'; Evans 68'

Umpires:
Frances Block (ENG)
Emma Simmons (BER)

==== Third and fourth place ====
15 February 2009
14:00

Chile	2–1	Trinidad and Tobago
Rodríguez 37'; D. Infante 49'	Report	Wynne 3'

Umpires:
Wendy Stewart (CAN)
Irene Presenqui (ARG)

==== Final ====
15 February 2009
16:30

Argentina	2–2 (a.e.t.)	United States
Rebecchi 9'; Luchetti 39'	Report	Lingo 29', 64'
Penalties
Barrionuevo (penalty shoot-out scored); Luchetti (penalty shoot-out missed); Arrondo (penalty shoot-out scored); Aguirre (penalty shoot-out scored); Rebecchi (penalty shoot-out scored); Barrionuevo (penalty shoot-out scored); Luchetti (penalty shoot-out scored); Arrondo (penalty shoot-out scored)	7–6	(penalty shoot-out missed) Rizzo; (penalty shoot-out scored) Bashore; (penalty shoot-out scored) R. Dawson; (penalty shoot-out scored) Nichols; (penalty shoot-out scored) Snow; (penalty shoot-out scored) Nichols; (penalty shoot-out scored) Snow; (penalty shoot-out missed) R. Dawson

Umpires:
Jean Duncan (SCO)
Frances Block (ENG)

Team details

Argentina
United States

GK	13	Laura Aladro
DF	6	Sol Parral
DF	25	Silvina D'Elía
DF	26	Giselle Kañevsky	30
DF	27	Noel Barrionuevo	(yellow card) 85'
MF	4	Rosario Luchetti (c)
MF	18	Daniela Sruoga
MF	22	Gabriela Aguirre
FW	2	Delfina Merino	(yellow card) 57'
FW	11	Carla Rebecchi
FW	21	Inés Arrondo
Substitutions:
FW	5	Rocío Sánchez Moccia		(substituted on) 20'
FW	15	Macarena Abente		(substituted on) 14'
	17	Victoria Villalba		(substituted on) 20'
Coach:
(Argentina) Gabriel Minadeo

GK	25	Amy Tran
DF	19	Caroline Nichols
DF	26	Kayla Bashore Smedley
DF	27	Lauren Crandall
MF	7	Jesse Gey
MF	8	Rachel Dawson
MF	17	Carrie Lingo (c)
MF	32	Katie Reinprecht
FW	9	Sarah Dawson	10
FW	10	Tiffany Snow
FW	13	Kelly Smith
Substitutions:
MF	6	Katie Evans	33	(substituted on) 26'
DF	11	Sara Silvetti		(substituted on) 20'
	21	Claire Laubach		(substituted on) 51'
	24	Dina Rizzo		(substituted on) 13'
MF	28	Lauren Powley		(substituted on) 29'
Coach:
(Australia) Lee Bodimeade

== Statistics ==
=== Final standings ===
1. Argentina
2. United States
3. Chile
4. Trinidad and Tobago
5. Canada
6. Mexico
7. Jamaica
8. Bermuda

=== Awards ===
Top Goalscorer	Player of the Tournament	Goalkeeper of the Tournament
(Argentina) Noel Barrionuevo	(Argentina) Carla Rebecchi	(Chile) Claudia Schüler

=== Goalscorers ===
10 goals

- (Argentina) Noel Barrionuevo

7 goals

- (Argentina) Carla Rebecchi

6 goals

- (United States) Carrie Lingo

5 goals

- (Argentina) Macarena Abente
- (Canada) Thea Culley

4 goals

- (Argentina) Rosario Luchetti
- (Argentina) Daniela Sruoga
- (Canada) Jessalyn Walkey
- (Chile) Denise Infante
- (Mexico) Jesús Aide Castillo Marín
- (Trinidad and Tobago) Stacey Siu Butt
- (United States) Tiffany Snow

3 goals

- (Argentina) Yanina Rojas
- (Canada) Stephanie Nesbitt
- (Mexico) Michel Navarro Hernández
- (Trinidad and Tobago) Nicole Aming
- (Trinidad and Tobago) Blair Wynne
- (United States) Rachel Dawson
- (United States) Keli Smith

2 goals

- (Canada) Shannon Elmitt
- (Canada) Stephanie Jameson
- (Canada) Caillie O'Hara
- (Chile) Daniela Caram
- (Mexico) Margarita Paredes Rodríguez
- (United States) Lauren Crandall
- (United States) Sarah Dawson
- (United States) Katherine Reinprecht

1 goal

- (Argentina) Inés Arrondo
- (Argentina) Silvina D'Elía
- (Argentina) Giselle Kañevsky
- (Argentina) Delfina Merino
- (Argentina) Victoria Villalba
- (Argentina) Victoria Zuloaga
- (Canada) Katie Begley Baker
- (Canada) Tiffany Michaluk
- (Canada) Diana Roemer
- (Canada) Katie Rushton
- (Canada) Natalie Wise
- (Chile) Fernanda Rodríguez
- (Chile) Catalina Thiermann
- (Chile) Javiera Villagra
- (Chile) Michelle Wilson
- (Jamaica) Nicole Grant
- (Jamaica) Krystal Reid
- (Jamaica) Sharee Russell
- (Mexico) Eliana Cota Felipe
- (Mexico) Lilia Flores Hernández
- (Trinidad and Tobago) Tonia-Marie James
- (Trinidad and Tobago) Krizia Layne
- (United States) Kayla Bashore
- (United States) Kathryn Evans
- (United States) Jesse Gey
- (United States) Lauren Powley
- (United States) Dina Rizzo

== See also ==
- 2009 Men's Pan American Cup
