= 2021 Men's Pan American Challenge =

International field hockey competition

Tournament details
- Host country: Peru
- City: Lima
- Dates: 26 September – 2 October
- Teams: 3 (from 1 confederation)
- Venue(s): Complejo Panamericano de Villa Maria del Triunfo

Final positions
- Champions: Mexico (1st title)
- Runner-up: Peru
- Third place: Ecuador

Tournament statistics
- Matches played: 6
- Goals scored: 55 (9.17 per match)
- Top scorer(s): (Mexico) Francisco Aguilar (Mexico) Luis Villegas (7 goals)

The 2021 Men's Pan American Challenge was the third edition of the Men's Pan American Challenge, the quadrennial qualification tournament for the Men's Pan American Cup organized by the Pan American Hockey Federation.

The tournament was held alongside the women's tournament in Lima, Peru from 26 September to 2 October 2021. The tournament was originally scheduled to be held from 27 June to 5 July 2020. Due to the COVID-19 pandemic, the tournament was postponed and on 4 February 2021 the current dates were announced. The top two teams qualified for the 2022 Men's Pan American Cup.

== Results ==
=== Standings ===
Pos	Team	Pld	W	D	L	GF	GA	GD	Pts	Qualification
1	Mexico	4	4	0	0	45	0	+45	12	2022 Pan American Cup
2	Peru (H)	4	2	0	2	10	14	−4	6	2022 Pan American Cup
3	Ecuador	4	0	0	4	0	41	−41	0	
4	Venezuela	0	0	0	0	0	0	0	0	Withdrew

Source: FIH
Rules for classification: 1) points; 2) matches won; 3) goal difference; 4) goals for; 5) head-to-head result; 6) field goals for.
(H) Hosts

=== Matches ===
26 September 2021
15:00

Ecuador	0–15	Mexico
	Report	Muñoz 3', 55'; F. Aguilar 3', 47'; Rangel 9'; J. Aguilar 10', 35'; Villegas 12', 29', 39'; Sandoval 13', 17'; Gomez 21', 34'; Hernández 54'

Umpires:
Luis Cardona (GUA)
Reinier Diaz (CUB)

27 September 2021
16:00

Peru	0–7	Mexico
	Report	F. Aguilar 8'; Rangel 9', 56'; Hernández 26'; Gomez 48'; Muñoz 57'; Sosa 60'

Umpires:
Mary Driscoll (USA)
Renier Diaz (CUB)

28 September 2021
15:00

Peru	5–0	Ecuador
Diaz Espinosa 7'; Schouller 26'; Corno 35'; Huanca 47', 48'	Report

Umpires:
Mary Driscoll (USA)
Oscar Lares (MEX)

29 September 2021
15:00

Mexico	16–0	Ecuador
F. Aguilar 5', 14', 40', 44'; Gomez 9', 10', 19'; Rangel 14', 55'; Mendez 19'; Muñoz 23'; Villegas 26', 51'; Sandoval 48'; Sosa 50'; G. Gonzalez 52'	Report

Umpires:
Reinier Diaz (CUB)
Daniel Gonzalez Alvizuri (PER)

1 October 2021
15:00

Ecuador	0–5	Peru
	Report	Huanca 12'; Lopez 28'; Schouller 34', 43'; De Martis 50'

Umpires:
Victoria Pazos (PAR)
Luis Cardona (GUA)

2 October 2021
13:00

Mexico	7–0	Peru
Sandoval 4'; Hernández 10', 56'; Villegas 25', 47'; Muñoz 46'; J. Aguilar 55'	Report

Umpires:
Mary Driscoll (USA)
Victoria Pazos (PAR)

== Statistics ==
=== Final standings ===
Pos	Team	Qualification
1	Mexico	2022 Pan American Cup
2	Peru (H)	2022 Pan American Cup
3	Ecuador	

Source: FIH
(H) Host

=== Goalscorers ===
There were 55 goals scored in 6 matches, for an average of 9.17 goals per match.

7 goals

- (Mexico) Francisco Aguilar
- (Mexico) Luis Villegas

6 goals

- (Mexico) Jorge Gomez

5 goals

- (Mexico) Pablo Muñoz
- (Mexico) Daniel Rangel

4 goals

- (Mexico) Erick Hernández
- (Mexico) Alexander Sandoval

3 goals

- (Mexico) Jorge Aguilar
- (Peru) Daniel Huanca
- (Peru) León Schouller

2 goals

- (Mexico) Juan Sosa

1 goal

- (Mexico) Guillermo Gonzalez
- (Mexico) Yamil Mendez
- (Peru) Fabrizio Corno
- (Peru) Vincenzo De Martis
- (Peru) Rodrigo Diaz Espinosa
- (Peru) Fernando Lopez

Source: FIH

== See also ==
- 2021 Women's Pan American Challenge
