= 2024 Women's Pan American Challenge =

Tournament details
- Host country: Bermuda
- City: Hamilton
- Dates: 21–28 September
- Teams: 5 (from 1 confederation)
- Venue: National Sports Centre

Final positions
- Champions: Mexico (1st title)
- Runner-up: Paraguay
- Third place: Guyana

Tournament statistics
- Matches played: 10
- Goals scored: 25 (2.5 per match)
- Top scorer: (Mexico) Grecia Mendoza (6 goals)
- Best player: (Mexico) Arlette Estrada
- Best goalkeeper: (Guyana) Alysa Xavier

The 2024 Women's Pan American Challenge was the fourth edition of the Women's Pan American Challenge, the quadrennial qualification tournament for the Women's Pan American Cup organized by the Pan American Hockey Federation.

The tournament is held in Hamilton, Bermuda from 21 to 28 September. The winner qualify for the 2025 Women's Pan American Cup.

== Teams ==
- Bermuda
- Brazil
- Guyana
- Mexico
- Paraguay

== Preliminary round ==
All times are Atlantic Standard Time (UTC−04:00)

=== Standings ===
Pos	Team	Pld	W	D	L	GF	GA	GD	Pts	Qualification
1	Mexico	4	4	0	0	15	2	+13	12	Final
2	Paraguay	4	1	2	1	3	3	0	5	Final
3	Guyana	4	1	2	1	2	5	−3	5	Third place match
4	Bermuda (H)	4	1	1	2	3	9	−6	4	Third place match
5	Brazil	4	0	1	3	2	6	−4	1	

Source: FIH
Rules for classification: 1) points; 2) matches won; 3) goal difference; 4) goals for; 5) head-to-head result; 6) field goals for.
(H) Hosts

=== Matches ===
21 September 2024
15:45

Brazil	0–1	Guyana
	Report	Poole 58'

Umpires:
Victoria Pazos (PAR)
Claudia Montino (CHI)

21 September 2024
18:00

Paraguay	2–0	Bermuda
Lopez 8'; Sanabria 10'	Report

Umpires:
Mariana Reydo (ARG)
Erika Barbera (USA)

22 September 2024
15:45

Paraguay	0–0	Guyana
	Report

Umpires:
Diana Fuentes Castelo (MEX)
Angela De Silva (BER)

22 September 2024
18:00

Mexico	5–0	Bermuda
Mendoza 16', 39', 40'; Cardiel 27'; Estrada 32'	Report

Umpires:
Victoria Pazos (PAR)
Marisa Miro (PUR)

23 September 2024
18:00

Brazil	1–3	Mexico
Eiko 30'	Report	Acosta 5'; Mendoza 43'; Cardiel 57'

Umpires:
Mariana Reydo (ARG)
Angela De Silva (BER)

24 September 2024
15:45

Brazil	0–0	Paraguay
	Report

Umpires:
Claudia Montino (CHI)
Marisa Miro (PUR)

24 September 2024
18:00

Guyana	1–1	Bermuda
Klautky 10'	Report	Harris 30'

Umpires:
Diana Fuentes Castelo (MEX)
Erika Barbera (USA)

25 September 2024
18:00

Mexico	3–1	Paraguay
Cardiel 10'; Estrada 35'; Mendoza 60'	Report	Sanabria 37'

Umpires:
Mariana Reydo (ARG)
Marisa Miro (PUR)

27 September 2024
15:45

Mexico	4–0	Guyana
Noria 12'; Mendoza 42'; Estrada 54'; Nava 59'	Report

Umpires:
Victoria Pazos (PAR)
Angela De Silva (BER)

27 September 2024
18:00

Bermuda	2–1	Brazil
Towlson 38'; Hollis 46'	Report	Eiko 18'

Umpires:
Claudia Montino (CHI)
Diana Fuentes Castelo (MEX)

== Classification round ==
=== Third and fourth place ===
28 September 2024
15:30

Guyana	2–1	Bermuda
Fernandes 32'; Cadogan 51'	Report	Harris 23'

Umpires:
Erika Barbera (USA)
Marisa Miro (PUR)

=== Final ===
28 September 2024
18:00

Mexico	2–2	Paraguay
Acosta 14', 15'	Report	Pistilli 13'; Catebra 29'
Penalties
Mendoza (penalty shoot-out scored); Nava (penalty shoot-out missed); Oviedo (penalty shoot-out scored); Estrada (penalty shoot-out scored); Rivera (penalty shoot-out scored)	4–2	(penalty shoot-out scored) Catebra; (penalty shoot-out scored) Benitez; (penalty shoot-out missed) Duarte; (penalty shoot-out missed) Barreto

Umpires:
Marianav Reydo (ARG)
Claudia Montino (CHI)

== Statistics ==
=== Final standings ===
Pos	Team	Qualification
1	Mexico	2025 Pan American Cup
2	Paraguay	
3	Guyana	
4	Bermuda (H)	
5	Brazil	

Source: FIH
(H) Host

=== Goalscorers ===
There were 32 goals scored in 12 matches, for an average of 2.67 goals per match.

6 goals

- (Mexico) Grecia Mendoza

3 goals

- (Mexico) Maribel Acosta
- (Mexico) Dariana Cardiel
- (Mexico) Arlette Estrada

2 goals

- (Bermuda) Georgia Harris
- (Brazil) Mayara Eiko
- (Paraguay) Abril Sanabria

1 goal

- (Bermuda) Jessica Hollis
- (Bermuda) Mallory Towlson
- (Guyana) Abosaide Cadogan
- (Guyana) Madison Fernandes
- (Guyana) Sarah Klautky
- (Guyana) Makaylah Poole
- (Mexico) Nathalia Nava
- (Mexico) Ximena Noria
- (Paraguay) María Catebra
- (Paraguay) Bella Lopez
- (Paraguay) Paula Pistilli

Source: FIH

== See also ==
- 2024 Men's Pan American Challenge
