= Trinidad and Tobago men's national field hockey team =

National Hockey Team of Trinidad and Tobago

Trinidad and Tobago
- Nickname(s): Calypso Stickmen
- Association: PAHF (Americas)
- Confederation: Trinidad and Tobago Hockey Board
- Head Coach: Darren Cowie
- Manager: Chemika Ellis
- Captain: Jordan Viera; Mickell Pierre

FIH ranking
- Current: 36 ▲4 (5 August 2026)

Pan American Games
- Appearances: 14 (first in 1967)
- Best result: 2nd (1967)

Pan American Cup
- Appearances: 5 (first in 2004)
- Best result: 3rd (2013)
Medal record
Event	1st	2nd	3rd
Pan American Games	0	1	0
Pan American Cup	0	0	1
CAC Games	1	6	3
Total	1	7	4
Pan American Games
Silver medal – second place	1967 Winnipeg	Team
Pan American Cup
Bronze medal – third place	2013 Brampton	
Central American and Caribbean Games
Gold medal – first place	2002 Puerto Rico	Team
Silver medal – second place	1993 Ponce	Team
Silver medal – second place	2006 Santo Domingo	Team
Silver medal – second place	2010 Mayagüez	Team
Silver medal – second place	2014 Veracruz	Team
Silver medal – second place	2023 Santo Domingo	Team
Silver medal – second place	2026 Santo Domingo	Team
Bronze medal – third place	1986 Santiago	Team
Bronze medal – third place	1998 Caracas	Team
Bronze medal – third place	2018 Barranquilla	Team

The Trinidad and Tobago men's national field hockey team represents Trinidad and Tobago in men's international field hockey competitions.

== Tournament record ==
=== Pan American Games ===
- 1967 – (silver)
- 1971 – 7th place
- 1979 – 9th place
- 1983 – 7th place
- 1987 – 5th place
- 1991 – 7th place
- 1995 – 5th place
- 1999 – 6th place
- 2003 – 6th place
- 2007 – 4th place
- 2011 – 7th place
- 2015 – 7th place
- 2019 – 5th place
- 2023 – 7th place

=== Pan American Cup ===
- 2004 – 4th place
- 2009 – 5th place
- 2013 – (bronze)
- 2017 – 4th place
- 2022 – 7th place
- 2025 – Withdrew

=== Pan American Challenge ===
- 2024 – (gold)

=== Commonwealth Games ===
- 1998 – 8th place
- 2006 – 10th place
- 2010 – 10th place
- 2014 – 10th place

=== Central American and Caribbean Games ===
- 1982 – 4th place
- 1986 – (bronze)
- 1990 – 4th place
- 1993 – (silver)
- 1998 – (bronze)
- 2002 – (gold)
- 2006 – (silver)
- 2010 – (silver)
- 2014 – (silver)
- 2018 – (bronze)
- 2023 – (silver)
- 2026 – (silver)

=== Hockey World League ===
- 2012–13 – 26th place
- 2014–15 – 34th place
- 2016–17 – 26th place

== Results and fixtures ==
The following is a list of match results in the last 12 months, as well as any future matches that have been scheduled.

Win Draw Loss Fixture

=== 2026 ===
==== 2026 CAC Games ====
27 July 2026 Pool A	Mexico	1–5	Trinidad and Tobago	Santo Domingo, Dominican Republic
10:00	Sosa 44'	Report	Marcano 5', 14', 26'; Daniel 38'; Reynos 50'	Stadium: Parque del Este Hockey Stadium

29 July 2026 Pool A	Trinidad and Tobago	5–0	Barbados	Santo Domingo, Dominican Republic
10:00	Guiseppi 12'; Reynes 15+'; Whiteman 27'; Siu Butt 34', 59'	Report		Stadium: Parque del Este Hockey Stadium

31 July 2026 Pool A	Trinidad and Tobago	10–0	Guatemala	Santo Domingo, Dominican Republic
14:00	Tariq 2'; Marcano 6', 35', 58'; Tarell 7', 15'; Daniel 14', 55'; Siu Butt 39'; Whiteman 46'	Report		Stadium: Parque del Este Hockey Stadium

2 August 2026 Semi final	Trinidad and Tobago	2–1	Venezuela	Santo Domingo, Dominican Republic
12:30	Marcano 3', 18'	Report	Adrian 13'	Stadium: Parque del Este Hockey Stadium

4 August 2026 Gold medal match	Trinidad and Tobago	2–2 (1–2 p)	Cuba	Santo Domingo, Dominican Republic
14:45	Pierre 45'; Francis 58'	Report	Calderón 13'; Sánchez 40'	Stadium: Parque del Este Hockey Stadium
	Penalties
	Siu Butt (penalty shoot-out missed); Marcano (penalty shoot-out scored); Pierre (penalty shoot-out missed); J. Daniel (penalty shoot-out missed); S. Daniel (penalty shoot-out missed)		(penalty shoot-out scored) Calderón; (penalty shoot-out missed) Mena; (penalty shoot-out missed) Batista; (penalty shoot-out missed) Echevarría; (penalty shoot-out scored) Calderón

== See also ==
- Trinidad and Tobago women's national field hockey team
