= Field hockey at the 1987 Pan American Games =

- Start date: 9 August 1987
- End date: 19 August 1987
- Teams: 17

Field hockey at the 1987 Pan American Games in Indianapolis, United States took place from 8 to 19 August 1987.

== Medal summary ==
Event	Gold	Silver	Bronze
Men's field hockey	Canada	Argentina	United States
Women's field hockey	Argentina	United States	Canada

=== Medal table ===
* Host nation (United States)

Rank	Nation	Gold	Silver	Bronze	Total
1	Argentina	1	1	0	2
2	Canada	1	0	1	2
3	United States*	0	1	1	2
Totals (3 entries)		2	2	2	6

== Men's tournament ==
Men's field hockey at the 1987 Pan American Games
Tournament details
- Host country: United States
- City: Indianapolis
- Dates: 9–19 August
- Teams: 10 (from 1 confederation)

Final positions
- Champions: Canada (2nd title)
- Runner-up: Argentina
- Third place: United States

Tournament statistics
- Matches played: 29
- Goals scored: 146 (5.03 per match)

=== Group stage ===
==== Group A ====
Pos	Team	Pld	W	D	L	GF	GA	GD	Pts	Qualification
1	Canada	4	4	0	0	37	2	+35	8	Semi-finals
2	United States (H)	4	3	0	1	12	3	+9	6	Semi-finals
3	Mexico	4	2	0	2	12	18	−6	4	5th–8th place classification
4	Bermuda	4	1	0	3	2	21	−19	2	5th–8th place classification
5	Jamaica	4	0	0	4	4	23	−19	0	Ninth place game

Source: TheSports.org
(H) Hosts

9 August 1987

United States	3–0	Bermuda

9 August 1987

Canada	12–1	Mexico

10 August 1987

United States	6–1	Jamaica

10 August 1987

Canada	12–0	Bermuda

12 August 1987

Bermuda	1–0	Jamaica

12 August 1987

United States	2–0	Mexico

13 August 1987

Mexico	6–1	Bermuda

13 August 1987

Canada	11–0	Jamaica

15 August 1987

Canada	2–1	United States

15 August 1987

Mexico	5–3	Jamaica

==== Group B ====
Pos	Team	Pld	W	D	L	GF	GA	GD	Pts	Qualification
1	Argentina	4	4	0	0	17	0	+17	8	Semi-finals
2	Chile	4	3	0	1	8	7	+1	6	Semi-finals
3	Trinidad and Tobago	4	2	0	2	6	9	−3	4	5th–8th place classification
4	Barbados	4	1	0	3	2	9	−7	2	5th–8th place classification
5	Peru	4	0	0	4	1	9	−8	0	Ninth place game

Source: TheSports.org

9 August 1987

Chile	3–1	Peru

9 August 1987

Argentina	4–0	Trinidad and Tobago

11 August 1987

Chile	1–0	Barbados

11 August 1987

Argentina	3–0	Peru

12 August 1987

Barbados	1–0	Peru

12 August 1987

Chile	4–1	Trinidad and Tobago

13 August 1987

Trinidad and Tobago	2–0	Peru

13 August 1987

Argentina	5–0	Barbados

15 August 1987

Trinidad and Tobago	3–1	Barbados

15 August 1987

Argentina	5–0	Chile

=== Ninth to tenth place classification ===
16 August 1987

Jamaica	2–1	Peru

=== Fifth to eighth place classification ===
Cross-overs
16 August
Trinidad and Tobago	8
Bermuda	1
16 August
Barbados	2
Mexico	1

Fifth place
18 August
Trinidad and Tobago (a.e.t.)	2
Barbados	0
Seventh place
18 August
Mexico (a.e.t.)	4
Bermuda	3

==== Cross-overs ====
16 August 1987

Barbados	2–1	Mexico

16 August 1987

Trinidad and Tobago	8–1	Bermuda

==== Seventh and eighth place ====
18 August 1987

Mexico	4–3 (a.e.t.)	Bermuda

==== Fifth and sixth place ====
18 August 1987

Trinidad and Tobago	2–0 (a.e.t.)	Barbados

=== Medal round ===
Semi-finals
17 August
Canada (p.s.)	2 (4)
Chile	2 (2)
17 August
Argentina	6
United States	1

Gold medal match
19 August
Canada	3
Argentina	1
Bronze medal match
19 August
United States	4
Chile	2

==== Semi-finals ====
17 August 1987

Canada	2–2 (a.e.t.)	Chile
Penalties
	4–2

17 August 1987

Argentina	6–1	United States

==== Bronze medal match ====
19 August 1987

United States	4–2	Chile

==== Gold medal match ====
19 August 1987

Canada	3–1	Argentina

=== Final standings ===
1. Canada
2. Argentina
3. United States
4. Chile
5. Trinidad and Tobago
6. Barbados
7. Mexico
8. Bermuda
9. Jamaica
10. Peru

== Women's tournament ==
Women's field hockey at the 1987 Pan American Games
Tournament details
- Host country: United States
- City: Indianapolis
- Dates: 9–19 August
- Teams: 7

Final positions
- Champions: Argentina (1st title)
- Runner-up: United States
- Third place: Canada

Tournament statistics
- Matches played: 15
- Goals scored: 80 (5.33 per match)

=== Group stage ===
==== Group A ====
Pos	Team	Pld	W	D	L	GF	GA	GD	Pts	Qualification
1	Canada	2	2	0	0	13	0	+13	4	Semi-finals
2	Trinidad and Tobago	2	1	0	1	2	7	−5	2	Semi-finals
3	Jamaica	2	0	0	2	1	9	−8	0	Cross-over
4	Mexico	0	0	0	0	0	0	0	0	DNF

Source: TheSports.org

9 August 1987

Canada	7–0	Jamaica

11 August 1987

Trinidad and Tobago	2–1	Jamaica

15 August 1987

Canada	6–0	Trinidad and Tobago

==== Group B ====
Pos	Team	Pld	W	D	L	GF	GA	GD	Pts	Qualification
1	United States (H)	3	3	0	0	22	1	+21	6	Semi-finals
2	Argentina	2	2	0	0	11	4	+7	4	Semi-finals
3	Barbados	3	1	0	2	5	15	−10	2	Fifth place game
4	Bermuda	3	0	0	3	0	18	−18	0	Cross-over

Source: TheSports.org
(H) Hosts

10 August 1987

Argentina	5–0	Barbados

10 August 1987

United States	8–0	Bermuda

12 August 1987

Argentina	5–0	Bermuda

12 August 1987

United States	10–0	Barbados

14 August 1987

United States	4–1	Argentina

14 August 1987

Barbados	5–0	Bermuda

=== Fifth to seventh place classification ===
5th–7th place semifinal
17 August
Jamaica	7
Bermuda	0

Fifth place
18 August
Barbados	2
Jamaica	1

==== Cross-over ====
17 August 1987

Jamaica	7–0	Bermuda

==== Fifth and sixth place ====
18 August 1987

Barbados	2–1	Jamaica

=== Medal round ===
Semi-finals
16 August
Argentina	1
Canada	0
16 August
United States	5
Trinidad and Tobago	0

Gold medal match
19 August
Argentina	3
United States	2
Bronze medal match
19 August
Canada	5
Trinidad and Tobago	0

==== Semi-finals ====
16 August 1987

Argentina	1–0	Canada

16 August 1987

United States	5–0	Trinidad and Tobago

==== Bronze medal match ====
19 August 1987

Canada	5–0	Trinidad and Tobago

==== Gold medal match ====
19 August 1987

Argentina	3–2	United States

=== Final standings ===
1. Argentina
2. United States
3. Canada
4. Trinidad and Tobago
5. Barbados
6. Jamaica
7. Bermuda
