= Mexico men's national field hockey team =

Mexico
- Association: Federación Mexicana de Hockey (FMH)
- Confederation: PAHF
- Head Coach: Pol Moreno
- Manager: Hector Chavira
- Captain: Roberto García

FIH ranking
- Current: 30 ▲1 (4 October 2026)

Olympic Games
- Appearances: 2 (first in 1968)
- Best result: 16th (1968, 1972)

Pan American Games
- Appearances: 11 (first in 1967)
- Best result: 2nd (1971)

Pan American Cup
- Appearances: 7 (first in 2000)
- Best result: 5th (2022)
Medal record
Event	1st	2nd	3rd
Pan American Games	0	1	2
Pan American Challenge	1	0	0
Central American and Caribbean Games	2	4	5
Total	3	5	7
Pan American Games
Silver medal – second place	1971 Cali	Team
Bronze medal – third place	1975 Mexico City	Team
Bronze medal – third place	1979 San Juan	Team
Pan American Challenge
Gold medal – first place	2021 Lima	Team
Central American and Caribbean Games
Gold medal – first place	2010 Mayagüez	Team
Gold medal – first place	2023 Santo Domingo	Team
Silver medal – second place	1982 Havana	Team
Silver medal – second place	1986 Santiago	Team
Silver medal – second place	1998 Caracas	Team
Silver medal – second place	2018 Barranquilla	Team
Bronze medal – third place	1990 Mexico City	Team
Bronze medal – third place	1993 Ponce	Team
Bronze medal – third place	2002 Puerto Rico	Team
Bronze medal – third place	2014 Veracruz	Team
Bronze medal – third place	2026 Santo Domingo	Team

The Mexico men's national field hockey team represents Mexico in international field hockey competitions.

== Tournament history ==
=== Olympic Games ===
- 1968 – 16th
- 1972 – 16th

=== Pan American Games ===
- 1967 – 6th
- 1971 – (silver)
- 1975 – (bronze)
- 1979 – (bronze)
- 1983 – 5th
- 1987 – 7th
- 1999 – 7th
- 2011 – 6th
- 2015 – 6th
- 2019 – 7th
- 2023 – 6th

=== Pan American Cup ===
Pan American Cup record
Year	Host	Position	Pld	W	D*	L	GF	GA
2000	Havana, Cuba	7th	6	2	0	4	7	33
2004	London, Canada	6th	6	2	0	4	9	15
2009	Santiago, Chile	6th	5	2	0	3	26	20
2013	Brampton, Canada	6th	5	2	0	3	12	25
2017	Lancaster, United States	7th	5	1	0	4	5	20
2022	Santiago, Chile	5th	5	2	0	3	11	24
2025	Montevideo, Uruguay	5th	5	3	0	2	12	18
Total		5th place	37	14	0	23	82	155

=== Central American and Caribbean Games ===
- 1982 – (silver)
- 1986 – (silver)
- 1990 – (bronze)
- 1993 – (bronze)
- 1998 – (silver)
- 2002 – (bronze)
- 2006 – 4th
- 2010 – (gold)
- 2014 – (bronze)
- 2018 – (silver)
- 2023 – (gold)
- 2026 – (bronze)

=== Pan American Challenge ===
- 2021 – (gold)

=== Hockey World League ===
- 2012–13 – Round1
- 2014–15 – 35th
- 2016–17 – Round 1

=== FIH Hockey Series ===
- 2018–19 – Round 2

== Results and fixtures ==
The following is a list of match results in the last 12 months, as well as any future matches that have been scheduled.

Win Draw Loss Fixture

=== 2026 ===
==== 2026 CAC Games ====
27 July 2026 Pool A	Mexico	1–5	Trinidad and Tobago	Santo Domingo, Dominican Republic
10:00	Sosa 44'	Report	Marcano 5', 14', 26'; Daniel 38'; Reynos 50'	Stadium: Parque del Este Hockey Stadium

29 July 2026 Pool A	Guatemala	0–5	Mexico	Santo Domingo, Dominican Republic
12:00		Report	Estrada 34'; Villegas 41'; Sandoval 57', 58'; Benedith 60'	Stadium: Parque del Este Hockey Stadium

31 July 2026 Pool A	Mexico	3–0	Barbados	Santo Domingo, Dominican Republic
10:00	Benedith 40'; Sosa 41'; Sandoval 48'	Report		Stadium: Parque del Este Hockey Stadium

2 August 2026 Semi final	Cuba	3–2	Mexico	Santo Domingo, Dominican Republic
14:45	Batista 26', 49'; Calderón 50'	Report	Gomez 8'; Sandoval 32'	Stadium: Parque del Este Hockey Stadium

4 August 2026 Bronze medal match	Venezuela	1–5	Mexico	Santo Domingo, Dominican Republic
12:30	Andrian 9'	Report	Guzman 5'; Sosa 32'; Sandoval 49', 50'; Gomez 55'	Stadium: Parque del Este Hockey Stadium

== See also ==
- Mexico women's national field hockey team
