= El Salvador men's national field hockey team =

El Salvador
- Association: Federación Salvadoreña de Hockey (FESA)
- Confederation: PAHF
- Head Coach: Gerson Suarez
- Manager: Gerson Hernández Suárez
- Captain: Jonathon Presa

FIH ranking
- Current: 94 ▲8 (18 June 2026)

Olympic Games
- Appearances: 0 (first in 0)
- Best result: N/A

Pan American Games
- Appearances: 0 (first in 1967)
- Best result: N/A

Pan American Cup
- Appearances: 0 (first in N/A)
- Best result: N/A (TBD)

The El Salvador men's national field hockey team represents El Salvador in international field hockey competitions.

== Central American and Caribbean Games ==
- 2023 - 8th

== Central American Games ==
- 2025 – (bronze)

== Players ==
=== Current squad ===
No.	Pos.	Player	Date of birth (age)	Caps	Club
1	GK	Roberto Mendez	29 October 1999 (age 26)		(El Salvador) TBD
20	GK	Josue Arucha	29 October 1999 (age 26)		(El Salvador) TBD
		Caleb Hernandez	29 October 1999 (age 26)		(El Salvador) TBD
		Heber Alvarez	29 October 1999 (age 26)		(El Salvador) TBD
		Daniel Hernandez	29 October 1999 (age 26)		(El Salvador) TBD
		Carlos Vidal	29 October 1999 (age 26)		(El Salvador) TBD
		Jonathon Presa	29 October 1999 (age 26)		(El Salvador) TBD
		Luis Mejia	29 October 1999 (age 26)		(El Salvador) TBD
		Kevin Rodriguez	29 October 1999 (age 26)		(El Salvador) TBD
		Ronald Hernandez	29 October 1999 (age 26)		(El Salvador) TBD

== See also ==
- El Salvador women's national field hockey team
