= 2015 Women's Pan American Challenge =

Tournament details
- Host country: Peru
- City: Chiclayo
- Dates: 3 – 11 October 2015
- Teams: 5
- Venue: San Jose National College

Final positions
- Champions: Brazil (1st title)
- Runner-up: Barbados
- Third place: Peru

Tournament statistics
- Matches played: 13
- Goals scored: 61 (4.69 per match)
- Top scorer: (Brazil) Mayara Fedrizzi (7 goals)

The 2015 Women's Pan American Challenge was the second edition of the Women's Pan American Challenge. It was held between 3 and 11 October 2015 in Chiclayo, Peru, simultaneously with the men's tournament.

Brazil won the tournament for the first time by defeating Barbados 3–1 in the final. Peru won the bronze medal by defeating Puerto Rico 2–1 in the third place playoff.

== Participating nations ==
A total of five teams competed for the title:

- Barbados
- Brazil
- Panama
- Peru (host nation)
- Puerto Rico

== Results ==
=== Pool matches ===
Pos	Team	Pld	W	D	L	GF	GA	GD	Pts	Qualification
1	Barbados	4	2	2	0	18	3	+15	8	Final
2	Brazil	4	2	2	0	15	2	+13	8	Final
3	Peru (H)	4	2	2	0	13	3	+10	8	3rd-place match
4	Puerto Rico	4	1	0	3	4	14	−10	3	
5	Panama	4	0	0	4	0	28	−28	0	

Source: Panamhockey
Rules for classification: 1) points; 2) goal difference; 3) goals scored; 4) head-to-head result.
(H) Hosts

3 October 2015
13:00

Brazil	7–0	Panama
Beljon 3', 54'; Fedrizzi 5', 32', 34'; Noronha Machado 21'; Rodriguez 40'	Report

Umpires:
Carolina de la Fuente (ARG)
Natalia Lodeiro (URU)

3 October 2015
15:00

Puerto Rico	0–3	Peru
	Report	Moccagatta 5'; Devoto 32'; Mendez 58'

Umpires:
Cara Briggs (BAR)
Mary Driscoll (USA)

4 October 2015
13:00

Barbados	10–0	Panama
Jordan 2'; Wilson 10', 56'; Small 21', 47', 51'; Edwards 22'; Brathwaite 24', 50'; Greaves 25'	Report

Umpires:
Mary Driscoll (USA)
Maira Loaiza (PER)

4 October 2015
15:00

Brazil	1–1	Peru
Noronha Machado 13'	Report	Devoto 45'

Umpires:
Carolina de la Fuente (ARG)
Mercedes Selles (PAN)

5 October 2015
13:00

Puerto Rico	0–5	Barbados
	Report	Brathwaite 6', 55'; Prescod 9'; Jordan 37'; Small 53'

Umpires:
Maira Loaiza (PER)
Mercedes Selles (PAN)

6 October 2015
16:00

Peru	7–0	Panama
Qunio 18'; Mendez 23', 44'; Leon 24', 58'; Alvarez 33'; Ardiles 59'	Report

Umpires:
Cara Briggs (BAR)
Natalia Lodeiro (URU)

7 October 2015
13:00

Brazil	1–1	Barbados
Carvalho 18'	Report	Jordan 56'

Umpires:
Mary Driscoll (USA)
Natalia Lodeiro (URU)

7 October 2015
15:00

Panama	0–4	Puerto Rico
	Report	Torres 2'; Delgado 8', 47'; Ramos 10'

Umpires:
Carolina de la Fuente (ARG)
Cara Briggs (BAR)

8 October 2015
13:00

Puerto Rico	0–6	Brazil
	Report	Fedrizzi 4', 30'; Peyloubet 10', 28'; Beljon 56'; Rodriguez 59'

Umpires:
Carolina de la Fuente (ARG)
Maira Loaiza (PER)

8 October 2015
15:00

Barbados	2–2	Peru
Greaves 4'; Wilson 37'	Report	Ardiles 14'; Alvarez 37'

Umpires:
Mary Driscoll (USA)
Mercedes Selles (PAN)

=== Classification matches ===
==== Third to fifth place classification ====
Crossover
11 August 2017
Puerto Rico	4
Panama	0

Third place
13 August 2017
Peru	2
Puerto Rico	1

===== Crossover =====
10 October 2015
11:15

Panama	0–4	Puerto Rico
	Report	Rivera 17'; Delgado 32'; Bachelet 39', 40'

Umpires:
Maira Loaiza (PER)
Cara Briggs (BAR)

===== Third and fourth place =====
11 October 2015
11:15

Peru	2–1	Puerto Rico
Devoto 11'; Ardiles 22'	Report	Delgado 43'

Umpires:
Natalia Lodeiro (URU)
Cara Briggs (BAR)

==== Final ====
11 October 2015
13:30

Barbados	1–3	Brazil
Greaves 52'	Report	Beljon 20'; Fedrizzi 27', 30+'

Umpires:
Carolina de la Fuente (ARG)
Mary Driscoll (USA)

== Statistics ==
=== Final standings ===
Pos	Team	Pld	W	D	L	GF	GA	GD	Pts	Qualification
1	Brazil	5	3	2	0	18	3	+15	11	2017 Pan American Cup
2	Barbados	5	2	2	1	19	6	+13	8	2017 Pan American Cup
3	Peru	5	3	2	0	15	4	+11	11	
4	Puerto Rico	6	2	0	4	9	16	−7	6	
5	Panama	5	0	0	5	0	32	−32	0	

Source: FIH

== See also ==
- 2015 Men's Pan American Challenge
