= 2011 Women's Pan American Challenge =

Tournament details
- Host country: Brazil
- City: Rio de Janeiro
- Dates: 31 July – 7 August 2011
- Teams: 5 (from 1 confederation)
- Venue: Deodoro Stadium

Final positions
- Champions: Uruguay (1st title)
- Runner-up: Guyana
- Third place: Brazil

Tournament statistics
- Matches played: 12
- Goals scored: 44 (3.67 per match)
- Top scorer(s): (Paraguay) Maria Servian Giosa (Uruguay) Karina Bisignano (Uruguay) Lucia de Maria (4 goals)
- Best player: (Uruguay) Janine Stanley
- Best goalkeeper: (Paraguay) Claudia Flores Guillen

The 2011 Women's Pan American Challenge was the first edition of the Women's Pan American Challenge. It was held between 31 July and 7 August 2011 in Rio de Janeiro, Brazil, simultaneously with the men's tournament.

Uruguay won the tournament for the first time by defeating Guyana 6–0 in the final. Brazil won the bronze medal by defeating Paraguay 2–1 in the third place playoff.

== Participating nations ==
A total of five teams competed for the title:

- Bermuda
- Brazil (host nation)
- Guyana
- Paraguay
- Uruguay

== Results ==
=== Preliminary round ===
Pos	Team	Pld	W	D	L	GF	GA	GD	Pts	Qualification
1	Uruguay	4	4	0	0	15	0	+15	12	Final
2	Guyana	4	2	1	1	9	4	+5	7	Final
3	Brazil (H)	4	2	1	1	8	4	+4	7	3rd Place match
4	Paraguay	4	1	0	3	3	11	−8	3	3rd Place match
5	Bermuda	4	0	0	4	0	16	−16	0	

Source: Panamhockey
Rules for classification: 1) points; 2) goal difference; 3) goals scored; 4) head-to-head result.
(H) Hosts

==== Fixtures ====
31 July 2011
10:00

Brazil	3–0	Bermuda
Noronha 35+', 63'; P. Marqués 43'	Report

Umpires:
Mercedes Sánchez (ARG)
Keely Dunn (CAN)

31 July 2011
13:00

Paraguay	1–2	Guyana
L. Servián 3'	Report	K. Fernandes 41'; Garnett 60'

Umpires:
Emma Simmons (BER)
Vera Fonseca (BRA)

1 August 2011
10:00

Uruguay	6–0	Bermuda
Boccá 3'; De María 34'; Mora 48'; Carvalho 59', 69'; Bisignano 63'	Report

Umpires:
Keely Dunn (CAN)
Mercedes Sánchez (ARG)

1 August 2011
13:00

Guyana	1–1	Brazil
Woodroofe 35'	Report	Boos 28'

Umpires:
Mercedes Sánchez (ARG)
Emma Simmons (BER)

3 August 2011
10:00

Paraguay	0–5	Uruguay
	Report	Boccá 4'; De María 24', 62'; Bisignano 49', 70+'

Umpires:
Emma Simmons (BER)
Suzanne Sutton (USA)

3 August 2011
12:00

Bermuda	0–6	Guyana
	Report	C. Fernandes 13', 40'; D. De Groot 21'; M. Fiedtkou 22'; G. Xavier 42'; Sandison 67'

Umpires:
Keely Dunn (CAN)
Mercedes Sánchez (ARG)

4 August 2011
10:00

Bermuda	0–1	Paraguay
	Report	L. Servián 56'

Umpires:
Suzanne Sutton (USA)
Mercedes Sánchez (ARG)

4 August 2011
12:00

Uruguay	2–0	Brazil
Viana 25', 26'	Report

Umpires:
Emma Simmons (BER)
Keely Dunn (CAN)

6 August 2011
12:00

Guyana	0–2	Uruguay
	Report	Bisignano 4'; Norbis 22'

Umpires:
Mercedes Sánchez (ARG)
Emma Simmons (BER)

6 August 2011
14:30

Brazil	4–1	Paraguay
Ferraro 22'; Boos 37', 45'; P. Marqués 68'	Report	L. Servián 20'

Umpires:
Suzanne Sutton (USA)
Keely Dunn (CAN)

=== Classification round ===
==== Third and fourth place ====
7 August 2011
12:00

Brazil	2–1	Paraguay
Gelbcke 42', 58'	Report	L. Servián 28'

Umpires:
Emma Simmons (BER)
Suzanne Sutton (USA)

==== Final ====
7 August 2011
14:30

Uruguay	6–0	Guyana
De María 5'; Olaso 15'; Viana 21'; Carvalho 35'; Besio 42'; Norbis 53'	Report

Umpires:
Keely Dunn (CAN)
Mercedes Sánchez (ARG)

== Awards ==
Top Goalscorer(s)	Player of the Tournament	Goalkeeper of the Tournament	Fair Play Award
(Paraguay) Maria Servian Giosa (Uruguay) Karina Bisignano (Uruguay) Lucia de Maria	(Uruguay) Janine Stanley	(Paraguay) Claudia Flores Guillen	Guyana

== Statistics ==
=== Final standings ===
Pos	Team	Pld	W	D	L	GF	GA	GD	Pts	Qualification
1	Uruguay	5	5	0	0	21	0	+21	15	2013 Pan American Cup
2	Guyana	5	2	1	2	9	10	−1	7	2013 Pan American Cup
3	Brazil	5	3	1	1	10	5	+5	10	
4	Paraguay	5	1	0	4	4	13	−9	3	
5	Bermuda	4	0	0	4	0	16	−16	0	

Source: Panamhockey

=== Goalscorers ===
There were 44 goals scored in 12 matches, for an average of 3.67 goals per match.

4 goals

- (Paraguay) María L. Servián
- (Uruguay) Karina Bisignano
- (Uruguay) Lucía de María

3 goals

- (Brazil) Patrícia Boos
- (Uruguay) Paula Carvalho
- (Uruguay) Teresa Viana

2 goals

- (Brazil) Juliana Gelbcke
- (Brazil) Priscilla Marqués
- (Brazil) Tatiána Noronha
- (Guyana) Chantelle Fernandes
- (Uruguay) Bettina Boccá
- (Uruguay) Florencia Norbis

1 goal

- (Brazil) Bruna Ferraro
- (Guyana) Kerensa Fernandes
- (Guyana) Marzana Fiedtkou
- (Guyana) Amanda Garnett
- (Guyana) Dominique de Groot
- (Guyana) Leigh Sandison
- (Guyana) Trisha Woodroofe
- (Guyana) Gabriela Xavier
- (Uruguay) Virgínia Besio
- (Uruguay) Sofía Mora
- (Uruguay) Isabel Olaso
