= Federación Dominicana de Hockey =

Governing body of field hockey in the Dominican Republic

Dominican Republic Field Hockey Federation Federación Dominicana de Hockey
- Sport: Field Hockey
- Jurisdiction: The Dominican Republic
- Abbreviation: FDH
- Founded: 1999
- Affiliation: FIH
- Regional affiliation: PAHF
- Location: Parque del Este Hockey Stadium, Santo Domingo Este, Santo Domingo Province, Dominican Republic
- President: Miguel Ángel Hernández Basilio
- Vice president: Katy Rivas Contreras
- Secretary: Jhenyfer Veras Acevedo
- Men's coach: Leonardo Sepúlveda
- Women's coach: Yumai Oliva Alan
- (Dominican Republic)

The Dominican Republic Field Hockey Federation (Spanish: Federación Dominicana de Hockey) is the governing body of field hockey in the Dominican Republic. It is based in Santo Domingo Este, Santo Domingo Province, Dominican Republic.

== History ==
The federation started on 20 September 1999, just before the 2003 Pan American Games, held in the country. The first president was Radhamés Tavárez, later the also founder Mr. Rafael Fernando Sosa Nolasco, ran the federation until 2017, when he passed away after having been re-elected for several terms.

Since the death of Sosa Nolasco after 12 years of reign, the federation has been led by Miguel Ángel Hernández Basilio, and was last re-elected in 2024 for the 2024/2028 period.

== Coaches ==
The men's national team is coached by Leonardo Sepúlveda and the women's team is coached by the Cuban Yumai Oliva Alan.

== Board of directors ==
- President: Miguel Ángel Hernández Basilio
- First Vice President: Katy Rivas Contreras
- Second Vice President: Manuel Confesor Almonte Núñez
- Secretary: Jhenyfer Veras Acevedo

== Affiliations ==
- International Hockey Federation
- Pan American Hockey Federation
- Dominican Republic Olympic Committee
