= Field hockey at the 2006 Central American and Caribbean Games =

- Venue: Estadio de Hockey del Parque del Este
- Location: Santo Domingo Este, Dominican Republic
- Dates: 20–29 July
- Nations: 10

Champions
- Men: Cuba
- Women: Cuba

The Field hockey competition at the 2006 Central American and Caribbean Games was held in Santo Domingo Este, Dominican Republic. The tournament was scheduled to be held from 15 to 30 July 2006. The top two teams in each tournament qualified to compete at the 2007 Pan American Games in Rio de Janeiro, Brazil.

== Medal summary ==
=== Medalists ===
Event	Gold	Silver	Bronze
Men	Cuba; Yoel Gomez; Yankel Rojas; Alexander Abreu; Yuri Perez; Roberto Lemus; Alain Bardaji; Yoandy Blanco; Rolando Larrinaga; Orlando Padron; Eggy Iglesias; Lazaro Garcia; Alfredo Machin; Yoel Veitia; Roger Aguilera; Yasel Cabrera; Edelbeny Zayas	Trinidad and Tobago; Glen Francis; Akim Toussaint; Damian Gordon; Kurt Noriega; Solomon Eccles; Kwandwane Browne; Nigel Providence; Atiba Whittington; Wayne Legerton; Mickel Pierre; Nicholas Wren; Dwain Quan Chan; Keil Muarry; Christopher Scipio; Darren Cowie; Andrey Rocke	Netherlands Antilles; Joost Mees; Michel Lieshout; Caspar Verdijk; Tjerk Van de Braad; Sjors Hop; Arnout Vischeer; Jasper de Gier; Laurens Pels; Rogier Van der Meer; Wouter Plantenga; Bert Rijsemus; Jaap Overgaauw; Thomas Kolen; Gijs Hardeman; Martin Detmar; Simon Van Sprang
Women	Cuba; Daimi Rivas; Maribel Garcia; Yanelis Drake; Yaquelin Drake; Yordalia Duquesne; Greter Roque; Mairin Hernandez; Yolidaine Mayeta; Aglais Serrano; Yadira Puente; Mirialis Cairo; Yenes Casas; Anisley Texidor; Solienky Iglesias; Daylin Jorge; Senova Perez	Netherlands Antilles; Theresia Noorlander; Marlieke Van de Pas; Eva Wiedijk; Ingrid Gonesh; Miente Gast; Maria-Suzanne Beerekamp; Anne-Maaike Elsen; Ernestina Schreuder; Nienke Van Ruiten; Kiona Wellens; Sanne Van Donk; Kim De Rooij; Sanneke Kokkeler; Helena Visser; Hillegonda Hermanides; Debora-Amber Hesseling	Barbados; Tricia-Ann Greaves; Deborah Holder; Maria Browne; Patrina Brathwite; Allison Haynes; Lisa Crichlow; Keisha Jordan; Dionne Clarke; Charlia Warner; Lena Als; Ann-Marie Alleyne; Dareece Dyall; Reyna Farnum; Cher King; Nicole Tempro; Tara Howard

=== Medal table ===
Rank	Nation	Gold	Silver	Bronze	Total
1	Cuba (CUB)	2	0	0	2
2	Netherlands Antilles (AHO)	0	1	1	2
3	Trinidad and Tobago (TRI)	0	1	0	1
4	Barbados (BAR)	0	0	1	1
Totals (4 entries)		2	2	2	6

== Men's tournament ==
Men's field hockey at the 2006 Central American and Caribbean Games

Tournament details
- Host country: Dominican Republic
- City: Santo Domingo
- Dates: 20–28 July
- Teams: 8 (from 1 confederation)
- Venue: Santo Domingo Stadium

Final positions
- Champions: Cuba (6th title)
- Runner-up: Trinidad and Tobago
- Third place: Netherlands Antilles

Tournament statistics
- Matches played: 20
- Goals scored: 127 (6.35 per match)
- Top scorer: (Trinidad and Tobago) Kwandwane Browne (11 goals)
- Best player: (Trinidad and Tobago) Kwandwane Browne

=== Preliminary round ===
==== Pool A ====
Pos	Team	Pld	W	D	L	GF	GA	GD	Pts	Qualification
1	Trinidad and Tobago	3	3	0	0	24	1	+23	9	Semi-finals
2	Netherlands Antilles	3	2	0	1	13	3	+10	6	Semi-finals
3	Dominican Republic (H)	3	1	0	2	1	20	−19	3	
4	Puerto Rico	3	0	0	3	1	15	−14	0	

Source: PAHF
(H) Hosts

==== Pool B ====
Pos	Team	Pld	W	D	L	GF	GA	GD	Pts	Qualification
1	Cuba	3	3	0	0	22	2	+20	9	Semi-finals
2	Mexico	3	2	0	1	11	11	0	6	Semi-finals
3	Barbados	3	0	1	2	5	12	−7	1	
4	Venezuela	3	0	1	2	5	18	−13	1	

Source: PAHF

=== Fifth to eighth place classification ===
5–8th place semi-finals
26 July
Dominican Republic	1
Venezuela	7
26 July
Barbados	4
Puerto Rico	0

Fifth place
28 July
Venezuela	2
Barbados	3
Seventh place
28 July
Dominican Republic	1
Puerto Rico	2

=== Medal round ===
Semi-finals
26 July
Trinidad and Tobago	5
Mexico	3
26 July
Cuba	6
Netherlands Antilles	0

Gold medal match
28 July
Trinidad and Tobago	2 (3)
Cuba (p.s.)	2 (4)
Bronze medal match
28 July
Mexico	3
Netherlands Antilles (a.e.t.)	4

=== Final standings ===
Pos	Team	Qualification
1	Cuba	2007 Pan American Games
2	Trinidad and Tobago	2007 Pan American Games
3	Netherlands Antilles	
4	Mexico	
5	Barbados	
6	Venezuela	
7	Puerto Rico	
8	Dominican Republic (H)	

Source: PAHF
(H) Host

== Women's tournament ==
Women's field hockey at the 2006 Central American and Caribbean Games

Tournament details
- Host country: Dominican Republic
- City: Santo Domingo Este
- Dates: 21–29 July
- Teams: 8 (from 1 confederation)
- Venue: Estadio de Hockey del Parque del Este

Final positions
- Champions: Cuba (3rd title)
- Runner-up: Netherlands Antilles
- Third place: Barbados

Tournament statistics
- Matches played: 20
- Goals scored: 95 (4.75 per match)
- Top scorer: (Cuba) Drake Torres (8 goals)
- Best player: (Cuba) Anglais Serrano

=== Preliminary round ===
==== Pool A ====
Pos	Team	Pld	W	D	L	GF	GA	GD	Pts	Qualification
1	Cuba	3	3	0	0	17	0	+17	9	Semi-finals
2	Barbados	3	2	0	1	12	8	+4	6	Semi-finals
3	Jamaica	3	1	0	2	3	5	−2	3	
4	Dominican Republic (H)	3	0	0	3	1	20	−19	0	

Source: PAHF
(H) Hosts

==== Pool B ====
Pos	Team	Pld	W	D	L	GF	GA	GD	Pts	Qualification
1	Netherlands Antilles	3	2	1	0	12	4	+8	7	Semi-finals
2	Trinidad and Tobago	3	2	1	0	9	1	+8	7	Semi-finals
3	Mexico	3	1	0	2	5	7	−2	3	
4	Bermuda	3	0	0	3	2	16	−14	0	

Source: PAHF

=== Fifth to eighth place classification ===
5–8th place semi-finals
27 July
Jamaica	2
Bermuda	0
27 July
Mexico	3
Dominican Republic	0

Fifth place
29 July
Jamaica	3
Mexico	1
Seventh place
29 July
Bermuda	2
Dominican Republic	0

=== Medal round ===
Semi-finals
27 July
Cuba	6
Trinidad and Tobago	1
27 July
Netherlands Antilles	5
Barbados	0

Gold medal match
29 July
Cuba	3
Netherlands Antilles	2
Bronze medal match
29 July
Trinidad and Tobago	2
Barbados	4

=== Final standings ===
Pos	Team	Qualification
1	Cuba	2007 Pan American Games
2	Netherlands Antilles	2007 Pan American Games
3	Barbados	
4	Trinidad and Tobago	
5	Jamaica	
6	Mexico	
7	Bermuda	
8	Dominican Republic (H)	

Source: PAHF
(H) Host
