= 2024 Men's Pan American Challenge =

International field hockey competition

Tournament details
- Host country: Peru
- City: Lima
- Dates: 6–14 September
- Teams: 4 (from 1 confederation)
- Venue: Andres Avelino Caceres Sports Complex

Final positions
- Champions: Trinidad and Tobago (1st title)
- Runner-up: Peru
- Third place: Paraguay

Tournament statistics
- Matches played: 14
- Goals scored: 81 (5.79 per match)
- Top scorer: (Trinidad and Tobago) Teague Marcano (29 goals)

The 2024 Men's Pan American Challenge was the fourth edition of the Men's Pan American Challenge, the quadrennial qualification tournament for the Men's Pan American Cup organized by the Pan American Hockey Federation.

The tournament was held in Lima, Peru from 6 to 14 September The winner qualified for the 2025 Men's Pan American Cup. Trinidad and Tobago won their first title by defeating the hosts Peru 6–0 in the final.

== Teams ==
- Guatemala
- Paraguay
- Peru
- Trinidad and Tobago

== Preliminary round ==
=== Standings ===
Pos	Team	Pld	W	D	L	GF	GA	GD	Pts	Qualification
1	Trinidad and Tobago	6	6	0	0	54	2	+52	18	Final
2	Peru (H)	6	3	0	3	11	10	+1	9	Final
3	Guatemala	6	3	0	3	5	26	−21	9	Third place match
4	Paraguay	6	0	0	6	2	34	−32	0	Third place match

Source: FIH
Rules for classification: 1) points; 2) matches won; 3) goal difference; 4) goals for; 5) head-to-head result; 6) field goals for.
(H) Hosts

=== Matches ===
6 September 2024
13:00

Guatemala	2–1	Paraguay
Monterroso 12'; Calderón 39'	Report	Rodriguez 9'

Umpires:
Guillermo Poblete (CHI)
Kevin George (TTO)

6 September 2024
15:15

Trinidad and Tobago	2–0	Peru
Te. Marcano 39', 53'	Report

Umpires:
Oliver Höck (BRA)
Ridge Bair (USA)

7 September 2024
13:00

Trinidad and Tobago	9–0	Guatemala
Te. Marcano 5', 10', 27', 35'; Grant 34'; Wren 39', 45'; De Lisle 42'; Vieira 46'	Report

Umpires:
Juan Rodriguez (ARG)
Ridge Bair (USA)

7 September 2024
15:15

Paraguay	0–3	Peru
	Report	Dennison 42'; Huanca 44', 48'

Umpires:
Kevin George (TTO)
Rodwel Borrayo (GUA)

8 September 2024
10:30

Paraguay	0–13	Trinidad and Tobago
	Report	Te. Marcano 2', 14', 34', 50', 60', 60'; Daniel 7', 33'; Grant 18', 51'; De Lisle 25'; Wren 38'; Phillip 39'

Umpires:
Guillermo Poblete (CHI)
Rodwel Borrayo (GUA)

8 September 2024
12:45

Guatemala	1–5	Peru
Palma 37'	Report	Aldana 3'; Huanca 5'; Rehder 7'; Vives 34'; Diaz Espinosa 54'

Umpires:
Juan Pedro Rodriguez (ARG)
Oliver Höck (BRA)

10 September 2024
10:30

Guatemala	1–0	Paraguay
Calderón 9'	Report

Umpires:
Ridge Bair (USA)
Kevin George (TTO)

10 September 2024
12:45

Trinidad and Tobago	6–1	Peru
Daniel 15'; Te. Marcano 25', 50', 51', 53'; Grant 57'	Report	Huanca 12'

Umpires:
Oliver Höck (BRA)
Guillermo Poblete (CHI)

11 September 2024
10:30

Trinidad and Tobago	11–0	Guatemala
Vieira 7', 56'; Whiteman 12'; Francis 13'; Te. Marcano 17', 18', 30', 51'; Daniel 44', 49', 58'	Report

Umpires:
Juan Pedro Rodriguez (ARG)
Guillermo Poblete (CHI)

11 September 2024
12:45

Paraguay	0–2	Peru
	Report	Aldana 39'; Huanca 41'

Umpires:
Oliver Höck (BRA)
Kevin George (TTO)

13 September 2024
10:30

Paraguay	1–13	Trinidad and Tobago
Samudio 60+'	Report	Daniel 1'; Te. Marcano 3', 14', 15', 19', 32', 48', 52'; Grant 25', 31'; Vieira 29'; Wren 39'; Singh 48'

Umpires:
Juan Pedro Rodriguez (ARG)
Rodwel Borrayo (GUA)

13 September 2024
12:45

Guatemala	1–0	Peru
González 57'	Report

Umpires:
Ridge Bair (USA)
Guillermo Poblete (CHI)

== First to fourth place classification ==
=== Third and fourth place ===
14 September 2024
12:00

Guatemala	1–2	Paraguay
Calderón 35'	Report	Romero 49'; Villamayor 60'

Umpires:
Ridge Bair (USA)
Kevin George (TTO)

=== Final ===
14 September 2024
14:30

Trinidad and Tobago	6–0	Peru
Vieira 3', 33', 41'; Grant 41'; Te. Marcano 47', 59'	Report

Umpires:
Oliver Höck (BRA)
Juan Pedro Rodriguez (ARG)

== Statistics ==
=== Final standings ===
Pos	Team	Qualification
1	Trinidad and Tobago	2025 Pan American Cup
2	Peru (H)	
3	Paraguay	
4	Guatemala	

Source: FIH
(H) Host

=== Goalscorers ===
There were 81 goals scored in 14 matches, for an average of 5.79 goals per match.

29 goals

- (Trinidad and Tobago) Teague Marcano

7 goals

- (Trinidad and Tobago) Shaquille Daniel
- (Trinidad and Tobago) Nicholas Grant
- (Trinidad and Tobago) Jordan Vieira

5 goals

- (Peru) Daniel Huanca

4 goals

- (Trinidad and Tobago) Jovan Wren

3 goals

- (Guatemala) Abel Calderón

2 goals

- (Peru) Fernando Aldana
- (Trinidad and Tobago) Sheldon De Lisle

1 goal

- (Guatemala) Edwin González
- (Guatemala) Didier Monterroso
- (Guatemala) Gari Palma
- (Paraguay) Junior Rodriguez
- (Paraguay) Diego Romero
- (Paraguay) Mathias Samudio
- (Paraguay) Santiago Villamayor
- (Peru) Sebastian Dennison
- (Peru) Rodrigo Diaz Espinosa
- (Peru) Daniel Rehder
- (Peru) Alberto Vives
- (Trinidad and Tobago) Dylan Francis
- (Trinidad and Tobago) Shawn Phillip
- (Trinidad and Tobago) Tarell Singh
- (Trinidad and Tobago) Nicholas Whiteman

Source: FIH

== See also ==
- 2024 Women's Pan American Challenge
