= Field hockey at the 2014 Central American and Caribbean Games =

- Venue: High Performance Center
- Location: Veracruz, Mexico
- Dates: 15–24 November
- Nations: 9

Champions
- Men: Cuba
- Women: Cuba

The field hockey competitions at the 2014 Central American and Caribbean Games took place at the High Performance Center in Veracruz, Mexico, from 15 to 24 November 2014. There were two competitions, one each for men and women. Seven national teams competed in the men's tournament and eight in the women's event. The top two teams in each tournament qualified to compete at the 2015 Pan American Games in Toronto, Canada.

== Medal summary ==
=== Medalists ===
Event	Gold	Silver	Bronze
Men	Cuba (CUB); Leordan Hernandez; Yendry Delgado; Alexander Abreu; Dani Alonso; Alain Bardaji; Vladimir Prado; Darian Valero; Reynaldo Gonzalez; Nelson Ginorio Vega; Yoandy Blanco; Maikel Tritzant; Yoel Veitia; Roger Aguilera; Adrian Molina; Marcos Martinez; Yasmany Gutierrez	Trinidad and Tobago (TRI); Kiel Murray; Stefan Mouttet; Akim Toussaint; Dillet Gilkes; Darren Cowie; Nicholas Grant; Michael O'Connor; Marcus James; Mickel Pierre; Shaquille Daniel; Jordan Reynos; Tariq Marcano; Kristen Emmanuel; Andrey Rocke; Domonic Young; Shane Legerton	Mexico (MEX); Daniel Aguilar; Edgard Borquez; Yonathan Baez; Roberto Garcia; Edgar Garcia; Ricardo Garcia; Miguel Leon; Pol Moreno; Ruben Martinez; Bruno Pedraza; Miguel Othon; Francisco Aguilar; Luis Armando Estrada; Argenis Vasquez; Guillermo Pedraza; Moises Vargas
Women	Cuba (CUB); Yusnaidy Betancourt; Lismara Garcia; Sunaylia Nikle; Tahimi Licea; Yaniuska Paso; Roseli Harrys; Yailyn Abrahan; Mileysi Argentel; Brizaida Ramos; Marisbel Sierra; Helec Carta; Yunia Milanes; Yuraima Vera Rojas; Damnay Solis; Annelis Reyna; Ismary Hernandez	Dominican Republic (DOM); Cindy de la Rosa; Julieta Roncaty; Paola Martes; Cecilia Oflaherti; Norma Sanchez; Sabrely Reyes; Benifer Moronta; Augustina Birocho; Magalys Ortega; Lucia Navamuel; Yenny Leon; Teresa de la Rosa; Albania Marte; Soledad del Pino; Maria Disanti; Manuela Sanchez Guarin	Mexico (MEX); Jesus Castillo; Sonia Capetillo; Ana Juarez; Maribel Acosta; Dafne Carmona; Eliana Cota; Cindy Correa; Maria Correa; Aleexis Morales; Michel Navarro; Jennifer Valdes; Monserrat Iguanzo; Marlet Correa; Fernanda Oviedo; Mireya Bianchi; Karen Orozco

=== Medal table ===
* Host nation (Mexico)

Rank	Nation	Gold	Silver	Bronze	Total
1	Cuba (CUB)	2	0	0	2
2	Dominican Republic (DOM)	0	1	0	1
2	Trinidad and Tobago (TTO)	0	1	0	1
4	Mexico (MEX)*	0	0	2	2
Totals (4 entries)		2	2	2	6

== Men's tournament ==
Men's field hockey at the 2014 Central American and Caribbean Games

Tournament details
- Host country: Mexico
- City: Veracruz
- Dates: 14–24 November
- Teams: 7 (from 1 confederation)

Final positions
- Champions: Cuba (7th title)
- Runner-up: Trinidad and Tobago
- Third place: Mexico

Tournament statistics
- Matches played: 15
- Goals scored: 95 (6.33 per match)
- Top scorer: (Cuba) Yoandy Blanco (11 goals)
- Best player: (Mexico) Francisco Aguilar

Cuba won their seventh gold medal by defeating Trinidad and Tobago 5–1 in the final. The hosts and defending champions Mexico won the bronze medal by defeating Barbados 5–4 in a shoot-out after a 1–1 draw in regular time.

=== Preliminary round ===
==== Pool A ====
Pos	Team	Pld	W	D	L	GF	GA	GD	Pts	Qualification
1	Cuba	3	3	0	0	26	3	+23	9	Semi-finals
2	Trinidad and Tobago	3	2	0	1	17	6	+11	6	Semi-finals
3	Dominican Republic	3	1	0	2	12	10	+2	3	
4	Guatemala	3	0	0	3	0	36	−36	0	

Source: FIH

16 November 2014
11:00

Trinidad and Tobago	4–3	Dominican Republic
Marcano 3', 26', 66'; Grant 28'	Report	J. López 6', 8'; García 41'

Umpires:
Saleem Aaron (USA)
Jamar Springer (BAR)

16 November 2014
13:00

Cuba	17–0	Guatemala
Veitia 8', 10', 15', 21', 53', 57'; Blanco 24', 48'; Aguilera 28', 32', 33', 40'; Martínez 35'; Valero 44', 62'; Hernández 67'; Molina 70'	Report

Umpires:
Carlos Abreu (DOM)
Daniel Lopez Ramos (URU)

18 November 2014
11:00

Dominican Republic	8–0	Guatemala
Nivar 22'; García 40'; Cruz 41'; M. López 44'; Moncion 50', 53', 60'; Blanco 57'	Report

Umpires:
Nku Davis (TTO)
Jonathan Altamirano (MEX)

18 November 2014
13:00

Cuba	3–2	Trinidad and Tobago
Blanco 58', 63'; Bardaji 59'	Report	Reynos 14'; Daniel 18'

Umpires:
Daniel Basto Rivero (MEX)
Daniel Lopez Ramos (URU)

20 November 2014
11:00

Trinidad and Tobago	11–0	Guatemala
Murray 1', 43'; Toussaint 4', 70'; Reynos 9'; James 12', 47', 60'; Gilkes 35'; Marcano 59', 68'	Report

Umpires:
Carlos Abreu (DOM)
Jamar Springer (BAR)

20 November 2014
13:00

Dominican Republic	1–6	Cuba
Moncion 54'	Report	Blanco 4'; Molina 30'; Abreu 35'; Ginorio Vega 38'; Aguilera 62', 67'

Umpires:
Daniel Basto Rivero (MEX)
Duvaughn Henlon (JAM)

==== Pool B ====
Pos	Team	Pld	W	D	L	GF	GA	GD	Pts	Qualification
1	Mexico (H)	2	2	0	0	10	3	+7	6	Semi-finals
2	Barbados	2	1	0	1	5	5	0	3	Semi-finals
3	Jamaica	2	0	0	2	2	9	−7	0	

Source: FIH
(H) Hosts

16 November 2014
15:00

Mexico	6–1	Jamaica
Othon 19'; Leon 34'; Aguilar 47', 68'; Pedraza 59', 68'	Report	Davis 24'

Umpires:
Nku Davis (TTO)
Reinier Diaz (CUB)

18 November 2014
15:00

Barbados	2–4	Mexico
Wharton 17'; Rudder 68'	Report	Estrada 10'; Aguilar 14'; Borquez 35'; Moreno 37'

Umpires:
Saleem Aaron (USA)
Duvaughn Henlon (JAM)

20 November 2014
15:00

Jamaica	1–3	Barbados
Brodber 19'	Report	Forde 29'; Davis 36'; Rudder 42'

Umpires:
Jonathan Altamirano (MEX)
Reinier Diaz (CUB)

=== Fifth to seventh place classification ===
5–7th place semi-final
22 November
Guatemala	1
Jamaica	3

5th place
24 November
Dominican Republic (s.o.)	2 (2)
Jamaica	2 (0)

==== Seventh place ====
22 November 2014
11:00

Guatemala	1–3	Jamaica
Ramirez 61'	Report	Richards 31'; White 65'; Mitchell 69'

Umpires:
Carlos Abreu (DOM)
Jonathan Altamirano (MEX)

==== Fifth and sixth place ====
24 November 2014
11:00

Dominican Republic	2–2	Jamaica
Emiliano 20'; Garcia 51'	Report	Mitchell 4'; Gordon 44'
Penalties
Cruz (penalty shoot-out scored); Nivar (penalty shoot-out scored); Sepulveda (penalty shoot-out missed); Garcia (penalty shoot-out missed)	2–0	(penalty shoot-out missed) McGlashen; (penalty shoot-out missed) Beach; (penalty shoot-out missed) Gordon; (penalty shoot-out missed) Gardener

Umpires:
Reinier Diaz (CUB)
Jamar Springer (BAR)

=== Medal round ===
Semi-finals
22 November
Cuba	6
Barbados	0
22 November
Mexico	0
Trinidad and Tobago	1

Gold medal match
24 November
Cuba	5
Trinidad and Tobago	1
Bronze medal match
24 November
Barbados	1 (4)
Mexico (s.o.)	1 (5)

==== Semi-finals ====
22 November 2014
13:15

Cuba	6–0	Barbados
Blanco 27', 38', 55'; Martinez 33', 39'; Veitia 48'	Report

Umpires:
Nku Davis (TTO)
Daniel Basto Rivero (MEX)

22 November 2014
15:30

Mexico	0–1	Trinidad and Tobago
	Report	Toussaint 60'

Umpires:
Daniel Lopez Ramos (URU)
Saleem Aaron (USA)

==== Bronze medal match ====
24 November 2014
13:15

Barbados	1–1	Mexico
Wharton 14'	Report	F. Aguilar 68'
Penalties
Holder (penalty shoot-out missed); Davis (penalty shoot-out scored); Warner (penalty shoot-out missed); Wharton (penalty shoot-out scored); Holder (penalty shoot-out scored); Davis (penalty shoot-out scored); Holder (penalty shoot-out missed)	4–5	(penalty shoot-out scored) F. Aguilar; (penalty shoot-out missed) Leon; (penalty shoot-out missed) Pedraza; (penalty shoot-out scored) Martínez; (penalty shoot-out scored) Borquez; (penalty shoot-out scored) F. Aguilar; (penalty shoot-out scored) Borquez

Umpires:
Nku Davis (TTO)
Duvaughn Henlon (JAM)

==== Gold medal match ====
24 November 2014
15:30

Cuba	5–1	Trinidad and Tobago
Blanco 22', 28', 62'; Molina 41'; Veitia 63'	Report	Pierre 68'

Umpires:
Daniel Lopez Ramos (URU)
Saleem Aaron (USA)

=== Final standings ===
Pos	Team	Qualification
1	Cuba	2015 Pan American Games
2	Trinidad and Tobago	2015 Pan American Games
3	Mexico (H)	
4	Barbados	
5	Dominican Republic	
6	Jamaica	
7	Guatemala	

(H) Host

=== Awards ===
Player of the Tournament	Goalkeeper of the Tournament	Top Scorer of the Tournament
(Mexico) Francisco Aguilar	(Cuba) Leordan Hernández	(Cuba) Yoandy Blanco

== Women's tournament ==
Women's field hockey at the 2014 Central American and Caribbean Games

Tournament details
- Host country: Mexico
- City: Veracruz
- Dates: 15–24 November
- Teams: 8 (from 1 confederation)

Final positions
- Champions: Cuba (4th title)
- Runner-up: Dominican Republic
- Third place: Mexico

Tournament statistics
- Matches played: 20
- Goals scored: 64 (3.2 per match)
- Top scorer: (Cuba) Marisbel Sierra (11 goals)
- Best player: (Dominican Republic) Benifer Moronta

Cuba won their fourth gold medal by defeating the Dominican Republic 4–3 in a shoot-out after a 3–3 draw in regular time. The hosts Mexico won the bronze medal by defeating the defending champions Trinidad and Tobago 2–1.

=== Preliminary round ===
==== Pool A ====
Pos	Team	Pld	W	D	L	GF	GA	GD	Pts	Qualification
1	Cuba	3	2	1	0	9	3	+6	7	Semi-finals
2	Mexico (H)	3	2	1	0	8	2	+6	7	Semi-finals
3	Barbados	3	1	0	2	2	5	−3	3	
4	Jamaica	3	0	0	3	0	9	−9	0	

Source: FIH
(H) Hosts

15 November 2014
11:00

Cuba	4–0	Jamaica
Sierra 4', 13'; Carta 10'; Milanes 37'	Report

Umpires:
Nancy Altamirano (MEX)
Meghan McLennan (CAN)

15 November 2014
15:00

Mexico	2–0	Barbados
Navarro 42', 44'	Report

Umpires:
Keely Dunn (CAN)
Kecia Jones (TTO)

18 November 2014
09:00

Barbados	1–0	Jamaica
King 33'	Report

Umpires:
Nancy Altamirano (MEX)
Meghan McLennan (CAN)

19 November 2014
11:00

Barbados	1–3	Cuba
Davis 6'	Report	Paso 35'; Sierra 49', 54'

Umpires:
Keely Dunn (CAN)
Kecia Jones (TTO)

19 November 2014
15:00

Mexico	4–0	Jamaica
Cota 20'; Morales 25'; Orozco 31'; Carmona 46'	Report

Umpires:
Maggie Befort (USA)
Cara Briggs (BAR)

20 November 2014
09:30

Cuba	2–2	Mexico
Carta 14'; Milanes 33'	Report	M. Correa 7'; Orozco 24'

Umpires:
Veronica Villafañe (ARG)
Maggie Befort (USA)

==== Pool B ====
Pos	Team	Pld	W	D	L	GF	GA	GD	Pts	Qualification
1	Dominican Republic	3	2	1	0	11	3	+8	7	Semi-finals
2	Trinidad and Tobago	3	1	2	0	7	2	+5	5	Semi-finals
3	Guyana	3	1	1	1	2	4	−2	4	
4	Bermuda	3	0	0	3	0	11	−11	0	

Source: FIH

15 November 2014
09:00

Trinidad and Tobago	5–0	Bermuda
Thompson 30'; Brathwaite 35'; De Gannes 45'; Govia 47'; Trotman 51'	Report

Umpires:
Veronica Villafañe (ARG)
Dahianna Santana (DOM)

15 November 2014
13:00

Guyana	1–4	Dominican Republic
K. Fernandes 69'	Report	Birocho 30', 33'; Ortega 44'; Navamuel 49'

Umpires:
Dayana Martinez Jeune (CUB)
Maggie Befort (USA)

17 November 2014
09:00

Bermuda	0–5	Dominican Republic
	Report	Birocho 9', 32'; Marte 20'; Moronta 35'; Navamuel 44'

Umpires:
Kecia Jones (TTO)
Dayana Martinez Jeune (CUB)

19 November 2014
11:00

Trinidad and Tobago	2–2	Dominican Republic
Wynne 6'; Lewis 31'	Report	Moronta 8', 20'

Umpires:
Veronica Villafañe (ARG)
Nancy Altamirano (MEX)

19 November 2014
13:00

Bermuda	0–1	Guyana
	Report	Sandison 55'

Umpires:
Meghan McLennan (CAN)
Dahianna Santana (DOM)

20 November 2014
13:00

Guyana	0–0	Trinidad and Tobago
	Report

Umpires:
Keely Dunn (CAN)
Cara Briggs (BAR)

=== Fifth to eighth place classification ===
5–8th place semi-finals
21 November
Barbados	3
Bermuda	0
21 November
Guyana (s.o.)	0 (4)
Jamaica	0 (2)

Fifth place
23 November
Barbados	3
Guyana	0
Seventh place
23 November
Bermuda	0
Jamaica	2

==== 5–8th place semi-finals ====
21 November 2014
08:45

Barbados	3–0	Bermuda
Warner 41'; Clarke 58', 65'	Report

Umpires:
Kecia Jones (TTO)
Dahianna Santana (DOM)

21 November 2014
11:00

Guyana	0–0	Jamaica
	Report
Penalties
Xavier (penalty shoot-out scored); Fiedtkou (penalty shoot-out missed); Sandison (penalty shoot-out scored); Sutherland (penalty shoot-out scored); C. Fernandes (penalty shoot-out scored)	4–2	(penalty shoot-out missed) Nicholson; (penalty shoot-out missed) Knight; (penalty shoot-out scored) Airey; (penalty shoot-out scored) Griffiths

Umpires:
Nancy Altamirano (MEX)
Cara Briggs (BAR)

==== Seventh and eighth place ====
23 November 2014
08:45

Bermuda	0–2	Jamaica
	Report	Knight 24'; Tullongue 45'

Umpires:
Kecia Jones (TTO)
Dahianna Santana (DOM)

==== Fifth and sixth place ====
23 November 2014
11:00

Barbados	3–0	Guyana
Jordan 11'; Chewitt 22', 60'	Report

Umpires:
Dayana Martinez Jeune (CUB)
Nancy Altamirano (MEX)

=== Medal round ===
Semi-finals
21 November
Cuba	4
Trinidad and Tobago	2
21 November
Dominican Republic	2
Mexico	0

Gold medal match
23 November
Cuba (s.o.)	3 (4)
Dominican Republic	3 (3)
Bronze medal match
23 November
Trinidad and Tobago	1
Mexico	2

==== Semi-finals ====
21 November 2014
13:15

Cuba	4–2	Trinidad and Tobago
Sierra 9', 16', 49'; Carta 25'	Report	Wynne 13', 52'

Umpires:
Meghan McLennan (CAN)
Veronica Villafañe (ARG)

21 November 2014
15:30

Dominican Republic	2–0	Mexico
Di Santi 23', 54'	Report

Umpires:
Keely Dunn (CAN)
Maggie Befort (USA)

==== Bronze medal match ====
23 November 2014
13:15

Trinidad and Tobago	1–2	Mexico
Lewis 3'	Report	Navarro 37'; Juarez 48'

Umpires:
Keely Dunn (CAN)
Meghan McLennan (CAN)

==== Gold medal match ====
23 November 2014
15:30

Cuba	3–3	Dominican Republic
Sierra 2'; Solis 38', 50'	Report	Moronta 20'; Navamuel 24'; Ortega 47'
Penalties
Sierra (penalty shoot-out scored); Paso (penalty shoot-out scored); Carta (penalty shoot-out missed); Abrahan (penalty shoot-out scored); Vera Rojas (penalty shoot-out scored)	4–3	(penalty shoot-out missed) Birocho; (penalty shoot-out scored) Navamuel; (penalty shoot-out missed) Di Santi; (penalty shoot-out scored) Oflaherti; (penalty shoot-out scored) Ortega

Umpires:
Veronica Villafañe (ARG)
Maggie Befort (USA)

=== Final standings ===
Pos	Team	Qualification
1	Cuba	2015 Pan American Games
2	Dominican Republic	2015 Pan American Games
3	Mexico (H)	
4	Trinidad and Tobago	
5	Barbados	
6	Guyana	
7	Jamaica	
8	Bermuda	

(H) Host

=== Awards ===
Player of the Tournament	Goalkeeper of the Tournament	Top Scorer of the Tournament
(Dominican Republic) Benifer Moronta	(Mexico) Jesus Castillo	(Cuba) Marisbel Sierra
