= Sarah Dawson (field hockey) =

American field hockey forward/midfielder

Sarah Dawson (born November 17, 1982) is an American field hockey forward/midfielder, who earned her first senior career cap during the New Zealand Tour on May 16, 2005.

Dawson grew up in Berlin Township, New Jersey and attended Eastern Regional High School, where she graduated in 2001. She graduated from the University of Iowa in 2005, where she played for the Hawkeyes, having majored in Communications and Sports Studies. She has resided in Virginia Beach, Virginia.

== International senior competitions ==
- 2007 – XV Pan American Games, Rio de Janeiro, Brazil (2nd)
