= Bermuda women's national field hockey team =

Bermuda
- Association: Bermuda Hockey Federation
- Confederation: PAHF (Americas)

FIH ranking
- Current: 72 ▼4 (4 August 2026)

Pan American Games
- Appearances: 1 (first in 1987)
- Best result: 7th (1987)

Pan American Cup
- Appearances: 1 (first in 2009)
- Best result: 8th (2009)

The Bermuda women's national field hockey team represents Bermuda in women's international field hockey and is controlled by the Bermuda Hockey Federation, the governing body for field hockey in Bermuda.

== Tournament record ==
=== Pan American Games ===
- 1987 – 7th place

=== Pan American Cup ===
- 2009 – 8th place

=== Central American and Caribbean Games ===
- 1986 – 7th place
- 1990 – 5th place
- 1994 – 6th place
- 1998 – 5th place
- 2002 – 6th place
- 2006 – 7th place
- 2010 – 8th place
- 2014 – 8th place
- 2023 – 8th place
- 2026 – 8th place

=== Pan American Challenge ===
- 2011 – 5th place
- 2024 – 4th place

== Results and fixtures ==
The following is a list of match results in the last 12 months, as well as any future matches that have been scheduled.

Win Draw Loss Fixture

=== 2026 ===
==== 2026 CAC Games ====
26 July 2026 Pool B	Barbados	3–2	Bermuda	Santo Domingo, Dominican Republic
12:00	Wilson 43', 57'; Downes 55'	Report	Stempel 10'; Davidson 14'	Stadium: Parque del Este Hockey Stadium

28 July 2026 Pool B	Jamaica	0–1	Bermuda	Santo Domingo, Dominican Republic
10:00		Report	Smith 60'	Stadium: Parque del Este Hockey Stadium

30 July 2026 Pool B	Cuba	9–0	Bermuda	Santo Domingo, Dominican Republic
10:00	Tamayo 5'; Darias 9', 17'; Ramirez 13'; Martinez 18', 49'; Vera 30', 58'; Serrano 54'	Report		Stadium: Parque del Este Hockey Stadium

1 August 2026 5/8 Classification	Bermuda	1–1 (1–3 p)	Puerto Rico	Santo Domingo, Dominican Republic
10:15	Brewer 18'	Report	Yazzetti 11'	Stadium: Parque del Este Hockey Stadium
	Penalties
	de Silva (penalty shoot-out scored); Brewer (penalty shoot-out missed); Hollis (penalty shoot-out missed); Stewart (penalty shoot-out missed)		(penalty shoot-out scored) Morales; (penalty shoot-out missed) Woods; (penalty shoot-out scored) Ruiz; (penalty shoot-out scored) Aponte

3 August 2026 7/8 Classification	Jamaica	1–0	Bermuda	Santo Domingo, Dominican Republic
08:00	Packham 9'	Report		Stadium: Parque del Este Hockey Stadium
