= Guyana women's national field hockey team =

Guyana
- Association: Guyana Hockey Board
- Confederation: PAHF (Americas)

FIH ranking
- Current: 55 ▲2 (5 November 2025)

Pan American Cup
- Appearances: 1 (first in 2013)
- Best result: 8th (2013)

The Guyana women's national field hockey team represents Guyana in women's international field hockey competitions.

== Tournament history ==
=== Pan American Cup ===
- 2013 – 8th place

=== Central American and Caribbean Games ===
- 2010 – 5th place
- 2014 – 6th place
- 2018 – 7th place

=== Pan American Challenge ===
- 2011 – (silver)
- 2024 – (bronze)

== See also ==
- Guyana men's national field hockey team
