= Trinidad and Tobago women's national field hockey team =

Trinidad and Tobago
- Association: PAHF (Americas)
- Confederation: Trinidad and Tobago Hockey Board
- Head Coach: Anthony Marcano
- Manager: Sharon de Freitas
- Captain: Alanna Lewis

FIH ranking
- Current: 51 ▼2 (4 July 2025)

Pan American Games
- Appearances: 7 (first in 1987)
- Best result: 4th (1987, 1999)

Pan American Cup
- Appearances: 4 (first in 2004)
- Best result: 4th (2009)
Medal record
Central American and Caribbean Games
| Gold medal – first place | 1986 Santiago | Team |
| Gold medal – first place | 2002 Puerto Rico | Team |
| Gold medal – first place | 2010 Mayagüez | Team |
| Bronze medal – third place | 1990 Mexico City | Team |
| Bronze medal – third place | 1993 Ponce | Team |
| Bronze medal – third place | 2018 Barranquilla | Team |

The Trinidad and Tobago women's national field hockey team represents Trinidad and Tobago in women's international field hockey competitions.

== Tournament record ==
=== Pan American Games ===
- 1987 – 4th place
- 1991 – 7th place
- 1995 – 5th place
- 1999 – 4th place
- 2003 – 6th place
- 2011 – 7th place
- 2023 – 7th place

=== Pan American Cup ===
- 2004 – 8th place
- 2009 – 4th place
- 2013 – 7th place
- 2022 – 6th place
- 2025 – Withdrew

=== Central American and Caribbean Games ===
- 1986 – (gold)
- 1990 – (bronze)
- 1993 – (bronze)
- 2002 – (gold)
- 2006 – 4th place
- 2010 – (gold)
- 2014 – 4th place
- 2018 – (bronze)
- 2023 – 6th place

=== Pan American Challenge ===
- 2021 – (silver)

=== Commonwealth Games ===
- 1998 – 7th place
- 2010 – 9th place
- 2014 – 10th place

=== Hockey World League ===
- 2012–13 – 25th place
- 2014–15 – 30th place
- 2016–17 – 33rd place

== See also ==
- Trinidad and Tobago men's national field hockey team
