= Women's Pan American Cup =

Hockey tournament

- Most recent season or competition: 2025 Women's Pan American Cup
- Sport: Field hockey
- Founded: 2001; 25 years ago
- First season: 2001
- No. of teams: 8
- Confederation: PAHF (Americas)
- Most recent champion: Argentina (7th title) (2025)
- Most titles: Argentina (7 titles)
- Qualification: Pan American Challenge
- Related competitions: Pan American Games

The Women's Pan American Cup is a women's international field hockey tournament organized by the Pan American Hockey Federation. The winning team becomes the champion of the Americas and qualifies for the FIH Hockey World Cup.

Argentina are the defending champions, winning the 2025 edition. Argentina are also the only team to have won the tournament, winning every edition so far.

The hosts together with six highest-ranked teams from the previous edition are qualified directly for the tournament, they are joined by the top team from the Women's Pan American Challenge or the top two teams if the host is already qualified.

== Results ==
Ed.	Year	Host	Final			Third place match			No. teams
Ed.	Year	Host	Winner	Score	Runner-up	Third place	Score	Fourth place	No. teams
1	2001	Kingston, Jamaica	Argentina	4–1	United States	Canada	6–0	Uruguay	7
2	2004	Bridgetown, Barbados	Argentina	3–0	United States	Canada	5–0	Uruguay	8
3	2009	Hamilton, Bermuda	Argentina	2–2 (a.e.t.) (7–6 p.s.)	United States	Chile	2–1	Trinidad and Tobago	8
4	2013	Mendoza, Argentina	Argentina	1–0	United States	Canada	2–1	Chile	8
5	2017	Lancaster, United States	Argentina	4–1	Chile	United States	2–1	Canada	7
6	2022	Santiago, Chile	Argentina	4–2	Chile	Canada	1–0	United States	7
7	2025	Montevideo, Uruguay	Argentina	3–0	United States	Uruguay	2–0	Chile	8

== Summary ==
Team	Titles	Runners-up	Third places	Fourth places
Argentina	7 (2001, 2004, 2009, 2013*, 2017, 2022, 2025)			
United States		5 (2001, 2004, 2009, 2013, 2025)	1 (2017*)	1 (2022)
Chile		2 (2017, 2022*)	1 (2009)	2 (2013, 2025)
Canada			4 (2001, 2004, 2013, 2022)	1 (2017)
Uruguay			1 (2025*)	2 (2001, 2004)
Trinidad and Tobago				1 (2009)

* = host nation

== Team appearances ==
Nation	(Jamaica) 2001	(Barbados) 2004	(Bermuda) 2009	(Argentina) 2013	(United States) 2017	(Chile) 2022	(Uruguay) 2025	Total
Argentina	1st	1st	1st	1st	1st	1st	1st	7
Barbados	–	6th	–	–	WD	–	–	1
Bermuda	–	–	8th	–	–	–	–	1
Brazil	–	–	–	–	7th	–	–	1
Canada	3rd	3rd	5th	3rd	4th	3rd	5th	7
Chile	–	5th	3rd	4th	2nd	2nd	4th	6
Guyana	–	–	–	8th	–	–	–	1
Jamaica	5th	–	7th	–	–	–	–	2
Mexico	6th	–	6th	5th	6th	WD	6th	5
Netherlands Antilles	–	7th	–	Defunct				1
Paraguay	–	–	–	–	–	–	7th	1
Peru	–	–	–	–	–	7th	–	1
Trinidad and Tobago	–	8th	4th	7th	–	6th	WD	4
United States	2nd	2nd	2nd	2nd	3rd	4th	2nd	7
Uruguay	4th	4th	–	6th	5th	5th	3rd	6
Venezuela	7th	–	–	–	–	–	–	1
Total	7	8	8	8	7	7	8	

== See also ==
- Field hockey at the Pan American Games
- Men's Pan American Cup
- Women's Indoor Pan American Cup
- Women's Pan American Challenge
- Women's Pan American Junior Championship
