= Mexico women's national field hockey team =

Mexico
- Association: PAHF (Americas)
- Confederation: Federacion Mexicana de Hockey
- Head Coach: Arely Castellanos
- Assistant coach(es): Salvador Indurain
- Manager: Milton García
- Captain: Marlet Correa

FIH ranking
- Current: 30 ▲3 (4 August 2026)

World Cup
- Appearances: 3 (first in 1974)
- Best result: 7th (1976)

Pan American Games
- Appearances: 6 (first in 1991)
- Best result: 4th (1991)

Pan American Cup
- Appearances: 5 (first in 2001)
- Best result: 5th (2013)
Medal record
Central American and Caribbean Games
Gold medal – first place	2023 Santo Domingo	Team
Silver medal – second place	1990 Mexico City	Team
Silver medal – second place	1998 Caracas	Team
Silver medal – second place	2010 Mayagüez	Team
Silver medal – second place	2018 Barranquilla	Team
Silver medal – second place	2026 Santo Domingo	Team
Bronze medal – third place	2014 Veracruz	Team

The Mexico women's national field hockey team represents Mexico in women's international field hockey competitions.

== Tournament history ==
=== World Cup ===
- 1974 – 10th place
- 1976 – 7th place
- 1981 – 11th place

=== Pan American Games ===
- 1991 – 4th place
- 1999 – 7th place
- 2011 – 6th place
- 2015 – 6th place
- 2019 – 6th place
- 2023 – 8th place

=== Pan American Cup ===
- 2001 – 6th place
- 2009 – 6th place
- 2013 – 5th place
- 2017 – 6th place
- 2022 – Withdrawn
- 2025 – 6th place

=== Central American and Caribbean Games ===
- 1986 – 4th place
- 1990 – (silver)
- 1993 – 5th place
- 1998 – (silver)
- 2002 – 4th place
- 2006 – 6th place
- 2010 – (silver)
- 2014 – (bronze)
- 2018 – (silver)
- 2023 – (gold)
- 2026 – (silver)

=== Hockey World League ===
- 2014–15 – 25th place
- 2016–17 – 29th place

=== FIH Hockey Series ===
- 2018–19 – Second round

=== Pan American Challenge ===
- 2024 – (gold)

== Results and fixtures ==
The following is a list of match results in the last 12 months, as well as any future matches that have been scheduled.

Win Draw Loss Fixture

=== 2026 ===
==== 2026 CAC Games ====
27 July 2026 Pool A	Mexico	2–1	Dominican Republic	Santo Domingo, Dominican Republic
16:00	Lacheno 20'; Estrada 57'	Report	Birocho 13'	Stadium: Parque del Este Hockey Stadium

29 July 2026 Pool A	Puerto Rico	1–5	Mexico	Santo Domingo, Dominican Republic
14:00	Dukes 23'	Report	Rivera 14', 27'; Lacheno 15+', 54'; Mendoza 34'	Stadium: Parque del Este Hockey Stadium

31 July 2026 Pool A	Mexico	6–2	Venezuela	Santo Domingo, Dominican Republic
12:00	Estrada 22'; Espinoza 28', 32'; Pérez 52'; Aguilera 54'; Lacheno 56'	Report	Beltran 14'; Mujica 18'	Stadium: Parque del Este Hockey Stadium

1 August 2026 Semi final	Mexico	5–0	Barbados	Santo Domingo, Dominican Republic
12:30	Pérez 9', 60'; Espinoza 29'; Rivera 38', 51'	Report		Stadium: Parque del Este Hockey Stadium

3 August 2026 Gold medal match	Mexico	0–0 (0–2 p)	Cuba	Santo Domingo, Dominican Republic
14:45		Report		Stadium: Parque del Este Hockey Stadium
	Penalties
	Mendoza (penalty shoot-out missed); Lacheno (penalty shoot-out missed); Estrada (penalty shoot-out missed); Espinoza (penalty shoot-out missed)		(penalty shoot-out scored) Licea; (penalty shoot-out missed) Ramirez; (penalty shoot-out scored) Nikle

== See also ==
- Mexico men's national field hockey team
