= Pan American Hockey Federation =

Sports governing body

- Abbreviation: PAHF
- Formation: 1959; 67 years ago
- Type: Sports federation
- Headquarters: Coral Gables, Florida
- Region served: Americas
- Members: 30 member associations
- President: (Uruguay) Danae Andrada Barrios
- Parent organization: International Hockey Federation
- Website: panamhockey.org

The Pan American Hockey Federation is the field and Indoor hockey federation for the Americas. It consists of 30 Members. It is associated with the International Hockey Federation and hosts several continental competitions for national teams.

== Member associations ==
Highlighted are the countries that are part of the Pan American Hockey Federation.

- Argentina
- (The Bahamas) Bahamas
- Barbados
- Bermuda
- Bolivia
- Brazil
- Canada
- Cayman Islands
- Chile
- Colombia
- Costa Rica
- Cuba
- Dominican Republic
- Ecuador
- El Salvador
- Guatemala
- Guyana
- Haiti
- Honduras
- Jamaica
- Mexico
- Nicaragua
- Panama
- Paraguay
- Peru
- Puerto Rico
- Trinidad and Tobago
- United States
- Uruguay
- Venezuela

== Competitions ==
(Men's National Teams)

Continental competitions

- Pan American Cup
- Pan American Challenge
- Pan American Games

Regional competitions

- South American Championship
- Central American and Caribbean Games

Youth competitions

- Pan American Junior Championship
- Pan American Youth Championship

Indoor / Hockey5s

- Indoor Pan American Cup
- Pan American Hockey5s Cup
- Indoor Central American Championship
- Central American Hockey5s Championship

(Women's National Teams)

Continental competitions

- Pan American Cup
- Pan American Challenge
- Pan American Games

Regional competitions

- South American Championship
- Central American and Caribbean Games

Youth competitions

- Pan American Junior Championship
- Pan American Youth Championship

Indoor / Hockey5s

- Indoor Pan American Cup
- Pan American Hockey5s Cup
- Indoor Central American Championship
- Central American Hockey5s Championship

== Current champions ==
Competition	Men's	Women's
Continental competitions
Pan American Cup	Argentina (2025)	Argentina (2025)
Pan American Challenge	Trinidad and Tobago (2024)	Mexico (2024)
Pan American Games	Argentina (2023)	Argentina (2023)
Regional competitions
South American Games	Argentina (2026)	Argentina (2026)
Central American and Caribbean Games	Cuba (2026)	Cuba (2026)
Youth competitions
Pan American Junior Championship	Argentina (2026)	Argentina (2026)
Pan American Youth Championship	Argentina (2018)	Argentina (2018)
Indoor / Hockey5s
Indoor Pan American Cup	Argentina (2024)	United States (2024)
Pan American Hockey5s Cup	United States (2023)	United States (2023)
Central American Hockey5s Championship	Guatemala (2024)	Costa Rica (2024)
Indoor Central American Championship	Guatemala (2015)	Panama (2015)

Competition	Year	Champions	Title	Runners-up	Next edition
National teams
Pan American Cup	2025	Argentina	5th	United States	2029
Pan American Challenge	2024	Trinidad and Tobago	1st	Peru	2026
Pan American Games	2023	Argentina	11th	Chile	2027
South American Games	2026	Argentina	5th	Chile	2030
Central American and Caribbean Games	2026	Cuba	9th	Trinidad and Tobago	2030
Pan American Junior Championship	2026	Argentina	14th	Canada	2028
Pan American Youth Championship	2018	Argentina	2nd	Mexico	2026
Indoor Pan American Cup	2024	Argentina	2nd	Trinidad and Tobago	2027
Pan American Hockey5s Cup	2023	United States	1st	Trinidad and Tobago	2026
Indoor Central American Championship	2016	Guatemala	3rd	Costa Rica	2026
Central American Hockey5s Championship	2024	Guatemala	3rd	El Salvador	2026
National teams (women)
Women's Pan American Cup	2025	Argentina	7th	United States	2029
Women's Pan American Challenge	2024	Mexico	1st	Paraguay	2027
Pan American Games	2023	Argentina	8th	United States	2027
South American Games	2026	Argentina	4th	Chile	2030
Central American and Caribbean Games	2026	Cuba	6th	Mexico	2030
Pan American Junior Championship	2026	Argentina	9th	United States	2028
Pan American Youth Championship	2018	Argentina	3rd	Uruguay	2026
Central American Hockey5s Championship	2024	Costa Rica		Guatemala	2026

== National team rankings ==
Men's FIH Rankings as of 23 September 2026
PAHF	FIH	Change	Team	Points
1	4	Steady	Argentina	3512.35
2	19	Steady	Canada	2200.09
3	22	▲2	Chile	2102.16
4	27	Steady	United States	1960.11
5	31	Steady	Mexico	1775.16
6	34	Steady	Brazil	1715.81
7	36	Steady	Trinidad and Tobago	1677.28
8	41	Steady	Venezuela	1567.43
9	43	Steady	Dominican Republic	1512.72
10	52	▲4	Uruguay	1434.3
11	56	▼1	Barbados	1419.44
12	61	Steady	Puerto Rico	1391.34
13	63	Steady	Guatemala	1375.02
14	66	Steady	Jamaica	1373.48
15	77	▲1	Panama	1313.88
16	80	▼7	Peru	1295.87
17	82	Steady	Costa Rica	1290.72
18	83	Steady	Bolivia	1285.15
19	85	Steady	Guyana	1255.3
20	87	Steady	Ecuador	1240.46
21	91	Steady	Paraguay	1183.9
22	93	Steady	Bermuda	1160.6
23	94	Steady	El Salvador	895.01
Change from 31 August 2026

Women's FIH Rankings as of 28 September 2026
PAHF	FIH	Change	Team	Points
1	2	Steady	Argentina	3757
2	10	Steady	United States	2612.48
3	16	▼1	Chile	2108.84
4	19	▲1	Uruguay	2003.01
5	26	Steady	Canada	1676.22
6	30	Steady	Mexico	1595.56
7	37	Steady	Cuba	1384.22
8	42	▼1	Guatemala	1249.23
9	43	▲1	Paraguay	1239.35
10	45	▼2	Peru	1197.63
11	47	▲1	Barbados	1196.1
12	48	▲1	Dominican Republic	1194.52
13	53	Steady	Trinidad and Tobago	1180.8
14	57	Steady	Puerto Rico	1153
15	59	Steady	Bolivia	1142.47
16	60	Steady	Panama	1139.12
17	62	Steady	Guyana	1136.05
18	69	Steady	Brazil	1066.49
19	72	Steady	Bermuda	1046.06
20	73	Steady	Jamaica	1043.66
21	77	Steady	Costa Rica	875.86
22	80	Steady	Venezuela	726.83
Change from 31 August 2026
