= Parque del Este Hockey Stadium =

Field hockey stadium in Santo Domingo Este, Dominican Republic

- Estadio de Hockey del Parque del Este
- Interactive map of Parque del Este Hockey Stadium
- Full name: Estadio de Hockey sobre Césped del Parque del Este
- Address: Av. Faro a Colón, Parque del Este Complex; Santo Domingo Este, Santo Domingo Province; Dominican Republic
- Coordinates: 18.4791941°N 69.8478891°W
- Elevation: 32 m (105 ft)
- Operator: Dominican Republic Hockey Federation
- Seating type: Stadium seating
- Capacity: 200
- Type: Stadium
- Surface: Artificial turf
- Scoreboard: Yes
- Screen: LED
- Acreage: 2.471 acres (1.000 ha)

Construction
- Built: 2001
- Opened: 2003; 23 years ago
- Renovated: 2023
- Cost: RD$ 32.557 millions (US$1.92 millions)

The Parque del Este Hockey Stadium Estadio de Hockey sobre Césped del Parque del Este, is a field hockey facility on the Parque del Este complex, Santo Domingo Este, Santo Domingo Province, Dominican Republic.

The stadium was built in 2001 for the 2003 Pan American Games and hosted the field hockey competition for the games. It also served as sub-headquarters for the 2006 Central American and Caribbean Games mainly hosted in Cartagena, Colombia. But in 2021 it was deemed unusable and required a reconstruction because it was being used after the ending of the service life of ten years.

It was remodeled in 2023, including a US$600,000 new flooring to host the Central American and Caribbean Games when the Dominican Republic held seven sports from the regional games mainly hosted by El Salvador, and according to the then president of the local federation, the facilities were meant to develop sports tourism. This stadium hosted the 2026 Central American and Caribbean Games.

== See also ==
- Venues of the 2003 Pan American Games
