= Trinidad and Tobago at the 2027 Pan American Games =

- IOC code: TTO
- NOC: Trinidad and Tobago Olympic Committee

in Lima, Peru 2027 – 2027
- Competitors: 20 in 4 sports
- Medals: Gold 0 Silver 0 Bronze 0 Total 0

Pan American Games appearances (overview)
- 1951; 1955; 1959; 1963; 1967; 1971; 1975; 1979; 1983; 1987; 1991; 1995; 1999; 2003; 2007; 2011; 2015; 2019; 2023; 2027

Trinidad and Tobago is scheduled to compete at the 2027 Pan American Games in Lima, Peru from July 23 to August 8, 2027. This will be Trinidad and Tobago's 19th appearance at the Pan American Games, having missed only the 1959 edition.

== Competitors ==
The following is the list of number of competitors (per gender) participating at the games per sport/discipline.

| Sport | Men | Women | Total |
|---|---|---|---|
| Boxing | 0 | 1 | 1 |
| Field hockey | 16 | 0 | 16 |
| Gymnastics | 2 | 0 | 2 |
| Sailing | 0 | 1 | 1 |
| Total | 18 | 2 | 20 |

== Boxing ==
Trinidad and Tobago qualified a female boxer after she reached the semifinals at the 2026 Pan American Boxing Championship.

| Athlete | Event | Quarterfinal | Semifinal | Final | |
| Athlete | Event | Opposition Result | Opposition Result | Opposition Result | Rank |
|---|---|---|---|---|---|
| | Women's –60 kg | | | | |

== Field hockey ==
Trinidad and Tobago qualified a men's team after being finalist at the 2026 Central American and Caribbean Games.

Summary

| Team | Event | Group stage | | | | Semifinal | Final / BM / Pl. | |
| Team | Event | Opposition Result | Opposition Result | Opposition Result | Rank | Opposition Result | Opposition Result | Rank |
|---|---|---|---|---|---|---|---|---|
| Trinidad and Tobago men | Men's tournament | | | | | | | |

== Gymnastics ==
=== Artistic ===
Trinidad and Tobago qualified two male gymnasts in artistic at the 2026 Pan American Artistic Gymnastics Championships.

Men

| Athlete | Event | Qualification | | | | | | Total | Rank |
| Athlete | Event | F | PH | R | V | PB | HB | Total | Rank |
|---|---|---|---|---|---|---|---|---|---|
| | Individual all-around | | | | | | | | |

Qualification Legend: Q = Qualified to apparatus final

== Sailing ==
Trinidad and Tobago qualified 1 boat for a total of 1 sailor.

| Athlete | Event | Opening series | | | | | | | | | | | | | | | | | | Finals | | | | |
| Athlete | Event | 1 | 2 | 3 | 4 | 5 | 6 | 7 | 8 | 9 | 10 | 11 | 12 | 13 | 14 | 15 | 16 | Points | Rank | QF | SF | M / F | Points | Rank |
|---|---|---|---|---|---|---|---|---|---|---|---|---|---|---|---|---|---|---|---|---|---|---|---|---|
| | Sunfish | | | | | | | | | | | —N/a | | | | | | | | | | | | |
