= Beach volleyball at the 2019 Pan American Games – Women's tournament =

Beach volleyball – Women's tournament at the 2019 Pan American Games
- Venue: Estadio de Volley de Playa
- Dates: July 24-30
- Competitors: 32 from 16 nations

Medalists
Gold medal	Karissa Cook; Jace Pardon	United States
Silver medal	Ana Gallay; Fernanda Pereyra	Argentina
Bronze medal	Carolina Horta; Ângela Lavalle	Brazil

The women's tournament competition of the beach volleyball events at the 2019 Pan American Games will take place between 24-30 of July at the Estadio de Volley de Playa a temporary venue in the San Miguel cluster. The defending Pan American Games champions are Ana Gallay and Georgina Klug of Argentina. Georgina Each of the 16 pairs in the tournament will be placed in one of four groups of four teams apiece, and play a round-robin within that pool. The top two teams in each pool advance to the quarterfinals. The third along with the fourth-placed teams in each group, will be eliminated.

The 8 teams that advanced to the elimination rounds will play a single-elimination tournament with a bronze medal match between the semifinal losers.

== Schedule ==
Date	Start	Finish	Phase
Wednesday July 24, 2019	9:00	13:10	Preliminaries
Thursday July 25, 2019	10:40	14:50	Preliminaries
Friday July 26, 2019	8:00	12:10	Preliminaries
Saturday July 27, 2019	9:00	14:00	Elimination stage/Quarterfinal qualifiers
Sunday July 28, 2019	9:00	14:00	Quarterfinals
Monday July 29, 2019	9:50	13:10	Semifinals
Tuesday July 30, 2019	10:00	13:30	Gold/Bronze medal matches

== Results ==
All times are local, PET (UTC−5).

=== Preliminary round ===
==== Group A ====
Pos	Team	Pld	W	L	Pts	SW	SL	SR	SPW	SPL	SPR	Qualification
1	Delís – Martínez (CUB)	3	3	0	6	6	2	3.000	148	109	1.358	Quarterfinals
2	Caballero – Valiente (PAR)	3	2	1	5	5	2	2.500	130	109	1.193	Quarterfinals qualifying
3	Allcca – Mendoza (PER)	3	1	2	4	2	4	0.500	92	104	0.885	Quarterfinals qualifying
4	Vargas – Vasquez (ESA)	3	0	3	3	1	6	0.167	90	138	0.652	Placement 13th–16th

Source: Lima 2019

24 July 2019; 13:10	Allcca – Mendoza (Peru)	2–0	(El Salvador) Vargas – Vasquez	Estadio Voleibol de Playa – Court 1 Referees: Marlene Hernandez (MEX), Justo Ramon Benitez (PAR)
24 July 2019; 13:10	(21–10, 21–10); Report			Estadio Voleibol de Playa – Court 1 Referees: Marlene Hernandez (MEX), Justo Ramon Benitez (PAR)

24 July 2019; 13:10	Delís – Martínez (Cuba)	2–1	(Paraguay) Caballero – Valiente	Estadio Voleibol de Playa – Court 2 Referees: Lino Salamanca (VEN), Hernan Lovera (COL)
24 July 2019; 13:10	(16–21, 21–12, 15–13); Report			Estadio Voleibol de Playa – Court 2 Referees: Lino Salamanca (VEN), Hernan Lovera (COL)

25 July 2019; 14:50	Allcca – Mendoza (Peru)	0–2	(Paraguay) Caballero – Valiente	Estadio Voleibol de Playa – Court 1 Referees: Marlene Hernandez (MEX), Diego M. Medina (ARG)
25 July 2019; 14:50	(10–21, 17–21); Report			Estadio Voleibol de Playa – Court 1 Referees: Marlene Hernandez (MEX), Diego M. Medina (ARG)

25 July 2019; 14:50	Delís – Martínez (Cuba)	2–1	(El Salvador) Vargas – Vasquez	Estadio Voleibol de Playa – Court 2 Referees: Elvin Ryan Germain (LCA), Katrina Meyer (USA)
25 July 2019; 14:50	(18–21, 21–12, 15–7); Report			Estadio Voleibol de Playa – Court 2 Referees: Elvin Ryan Germain (LCA), Katrina Meyer (USA)

26 July 2019; 12:10	Allcca – Mendoza (Peru)	0–2	(Cuba) Delís – Martínez	Estadio Voleibol de Playa – Court 1 Referees: Omid Mojtahedi (CAN), Claudia Guerrero (HON)
26 July 2019; 12:10	(12–21, 11–21); Report			Estadio Voleibol de Playa – Court 1 Referees: Omid Mojtahedi (CAN), Claudia Guerrero (HON)

26 July 2019; 12:10	Caballero – Valiente (Paraguay)	2–0	(El Salvador) Vargas – Vasquez	Estadio Voleibol de Playa – Court 2 Referees: Claudia Vega (PER), Elvin Ryan Germain (LCA)
26 July 2019; 12:10	(21–17, 21–13); Report			Estadio Voleibol de Playa – Court 2 Referees: Claudia Vega (PER), Elvin Ryan Germain (LCA)

==== Group B ====
Pos	Team	Pld	W	L	Pts	SW	SL	SR	SPW	SPL	SPR	Qualification
1	Cook – Pardon (USA)	3	3	0	6	6	0	MAX	127	73	1.740	Quarterfinals
2	Araya – Valenciano (CRC)	3	2	1	5	4	2	2.000	107	109	0.982	Quarterfinals qualifying
3	Ayala – Ríos (COL)	3	1	2	4	2	4	0.500	105	106	0.991	Quarterfinals qualifying
4	Davidson – Grant (TTO)	3	0	3	3	0	6	0.000	76	127	0.598	Placement 13th–16th

Source: Lima 2019

24 July 2019; 9:50	Cook – Pardon (United States)	2–0	(Trinidad and Tobago) Davidson – Grant	Estadio Voleibol de Playa – Court 1 Referees: Justo Ramon Benitez (PAR), Marlene Hernandez (MEX)
24 July 2019; 9:50	(21–9, 21–8); Report			Estadio Voleibol de Playa – Court 1 Referees: Justo Ramon Benitez (PAR), Marlene Hernandez (MEX)

24 July 2019; 9;50	Ayala – Ríos (Colombia)	0–2	(Costa Rica) Araya – Valenciano	Estadio Voleibol de Playa – Court 2 Referees: Claudia Guerrero (HON), Lino Salamanca (VEN)
24 July 2019; 9;50	(15–21, 14–21); Report			Estadio Voleibol de Playa – Court 2 Referees: Claudia Guerrero (HON), Lino Salamanca (VEN)

25 July 2019; 11:30	Cook – Pardon (United States)	2–0	(Costa Rica) Araya – Valenciano	Estadio Voleibol de Playa – Court 1 Referees: Justo Ramon Benitez (PAR), Rocio Lai Delgado (DOM)
25 July 2019; 11:30	(21–11, 21–11); Report			Estadio Voleibol de Playa – Court 1 Referees: Justo Ramon Benitez (PAR), Rocio Lai Delgado (DOM)

25 July 2019; 11:30	Ayala – Ríos (Colombia)	2–0	(Trinidad and Tobago) Davidson – Grant	Estadio Voleibol de Playa – Court 2 Referees: Carolina B. Piston (URU), Marcos Braga (BRA)
25 July 2019; 11:30	(21–9, 21–12); Report			Estadio Voleibol de Playa – Court 2 Referees: Carolina B. Piston (URU), Marcos Braga (BRA)

26 July 2019; 8:50	Cook – Pardon (United States)	2–0	(Colombia) Ayala – Ríos	Estadio Voleibol de Playa – Court 1 Referees: Marcos Braga (BRA), Claudia Vega (PER)
26 July 2019; 8:50	(22–20, 21–14); Report			Estadio Voleibol de Playa – Court 1 Referees: Marcos Braga (BRA), Claudia Vega (PER)

26 July 2019; 8:50	Araya – Valenciano (Costa Rica)	2–0	(Trinidad and Tobago) Davidson – Grant	Estadio Voleibol de Playa – Court 2 Referees: Omid Mojtahedi (CAN), Erick Martínez (CUB)
26 July 2019; 8:50	(21–18, 22–20); Report			Estadio Voleibol de Playa – Court 2 Referees: Omid Mojtahedi (CAN), Erick Martínez (CUB)

==== Group C ====
Pos	Team	Pld	W	L	Pts	SW	SL	SR	SPW	SPL	SPR	Qualification
1	Horta – Lavalle (BRA)	3	3	0	6	6	0	MAX	126	71	1.775	Quarterfinals
2	Mardones – Rivas (CHI)	3	2	1	5	4	2	2.000	119	96	1.240	Quarterfinals qualifying
3	Orellana – Revuelta (MEX)	3	1	2	4	2	4	0.500	92	128	0.719	Quarterfinals qualifying
4	Charles – Valenciana (ISV)	3	0	3	3	0	6	0.000	64	126	0.508	Placement 13th–16th

Source: Lima 2019

24 July 2019; 12:10	Horta – Lavalle (Brazil)	2–0	(United States Virgin Islands) Charles – Valenciana	Estadio Voleibol de Playa – Court 1 Referees: Elvin Ryan Germain (LCA), Suzanne Lowry (USA)
24 July 2019; 12:10	(21–8, 21–7); Report			Estadio Voleibol de Playa – Court 1 Referees: Elvin Ryan Germain (LCA), Suzanne Lowry (USA)

24 July 2019; 12:10	Orellana – Revuelta (Mexico)	0–2	(Chile) Mardones – Rivas	Estadio Voleibol de Playa – Court 2 Referees: Rocio Lai Delgado (DOM), Claudia Guerrero (HON)
24 July 2019; 12:10	(19–21, 15–21); Report			Estadio Voleibol de Playa – Court 2 Referees: Rocio Lai Delgado (DOM), Claudia Guerrero (HON)

25 July 2019; 14:00	Horta – Lavalle (Brazil)	2–0	(Chile) Mardones – Rivas	Estadio Voleibol de Playa – Court 1 Referees: Sergio Silva Duarte (NCA), Omid Mojtahedi (CAN)
25 July 2019; 14:00	(21–16, 21–19); Report			Estadio Voleibol de Playa – Court 1 Referees: Sergio Silva Duarte (NCA), Omid Mojtahedi (CAN)

25 July 2019; 14:00	Orellana – Revuelta (Mexico)	2–0	(United States Virgin Islands) Charles – Valenciana	Estadio Voleibol de Playa – Court 2 Referees: Suzanne B. Lowry (USA), Claudia Guerrero (HON)
25 July 2019; 14:00	(21–12, 21–12); Report			Estadio Voleibol de Playa – Court 2 Referees: Suzanne B. Lowry (USA), Claudia Guerrero (HON)

26 July 2019; 11:20	Horta – Lavalle (Brazil)	2–0	(Mexico) Orellana – Revuelta	Estadio Voleibol de Playa – Court 1 Referees: Katrina Meyer (USA), Rocio Lai Delgado (DOM)
26 July 2019; 11:20	(21–10, 21–11); Report			Estadio Voleibol de Playa – Court 1 Referees: Katrina Meyer (USA), Rocio Lai Delgado (DOM)

26 July 2019; 11:20	Mardones – Rivas (Chile)	2–0	(United States Virgin Islands) Charles – Valenciana	Estadio Voleibol de Playa – Court 2 Referees: Sergio Cifuentes (GUA), Diego M. Medina
26 July 2019; 11:20	(21–15, 21–10); Report			Estadio Voleibol de Playa – Court 2 Referees: Sergio Cifuentes (GUA), Diego M. Medina

==== Group D ====
Pos	Team	Pld	W	L	Pts	SW	SL	SR	SPW	SPL	SPR	Qualification
1	Gallay – Pereyra (ARG)	3	3	0	6	6	1	6.000	140	93	1.505	Quarterfinals
2	Harnett – Lapointe (CAN)	3	2	1	5	5	3	1.667	138	128	1.078	Quarterfinals qualifying
3	Mendoza – Rodriguez (NCA)	3	1	2	4	3	4	0.750	112	125	0.896	Quarterfinals qualifying
4	Alvarado – Bethancourt (GUA)	3	0	3	3	0	6	0.000	82	126	0.651	Placement 13th–16th

Source: Lima 2019

24 July 2019; 9:00	Harnett – Lapointe (Canada)	2–1	(Nicaragua) Mendoza – Rodriguez	Estadio Voleibol de Playa – Court 1 Referees: Suzanne Lowry (USA), Elvin Ryan Germain (LCA)
24 July 2019; 9:00	(21–17, 14–21, 15–9); Report			Estadio Voleibol de Playa – Court 1 Referees: Suzanne Lowry (USA), Elvin Ryan Germain (LCA)

24 July 2019; 9:00	Gallay – Pereyra (Argentina)	2–0	(Guatemala) Alvarado – Bethancourt	Estadio Voleibol de Playa – Court 2 Referees: Eduardo Paiz (ESA), Rocio Lai Delgado (DOM)
24 July 2019; 9:00	(21–13, 21–11); Report			Estadio Voleibol de Playa – Court 2 Referees: Eduardo Paiz (ESA), Rocio Lai Delgado (DOM)

25 July 2019; 10:40	Harnett – Lapointe (Canada)	2–0	(Guatemala) Alvarado – Bethancourt	Estadio Voleibol de Playa – Court 1 Referees: Hernan D. Lovera (COL), Eduardo A. Paiz (ESA)
25 July 2019; 10:40	(21–16, 21–9); Report			Estadio Voleibol de Playa – Court 1 Referees: Hernan D. Lovera (COL), Eduardo A. Paiz (ESA)

25 July 2019; 10:40	Gallay – Pereyra (Argentina)	2–0	(Nicaragua) Mendoza – Rodriguez	Estadio Voleibol de Playa – Court 2 Referees: Sergio Cifuentes (GUA), Suzanne B. Lowry (USA)
25 July 2019; 10:40	(21–12, 21–11); Report			Estadio Voleibol de Playa – Court 2 Referees: Sergio Cifuentes (GUA), Suzanne B. Lowry (USA)

26 July 2019; 8:00	Harnett – Lapointe (Canada)	1–2	(Argentina) Gallay – Pereyra	Estadio Voleibol de Playa – Court 1 Referees: Hernan Lovera (COL), Elvin Ryan Germain (LCA)
26 July 2019; 8:00	(13–21, 22–20, 11–15); Report			Estadio Voleibol de Playa – Court 1 Referees: Hernan Lovera (COL), Elvin Ryan Germain (LCA)

26 July 2019; 8:00	Alvarado – Bethancourt (Guatemala)	0–2	(Nicaragua) Mendoza – Rodriguez	Estadio Voleibol de Playa – Court 2 Referees: Diego M. Medina (ARG), Katrina Meyer (USA)
26 July 2019; 8:00	(15–21, 18–21); Report			Estadio Voleibol de Playa – Court 2 Referees: Diego M. Medina (ARG), Katrina Meyer (USA)

=== Placement 13th–16th ===
13th–16th semifinals
Davidson – Grant (TTO)	2
Charles – Valenciana (ISV)	0
Vargas – Vasquez (ESA)	2
Alvarado – Bethancourt (GUA)	0

13th–14th place match
Davidson – Grant (TTO)	0
Vargas – Vasquez (ESA)	2
15th–16th place match
Charles – Valenciana (ISV)	0
Alvarado – Bethancourt (GUA)	2

==== 13th–16th semifinals ====
27 July 2019; 9:00	Davidson – Grant (Trinidad and Tobago)	2–0	(United States Virgin Islands) Charles – Valenciana	Estadio Voleibol de Playa – Court 2 Referees: Erick Martínez (CUB), Hernan D. Lovera (COL)
27 July 2019; 9:00	(21–8, 21–10); Report			Estadio Voleibol de Playa – Court 2 Referees: Erick Martínez (CUB), Hernan D. Lovera (COL)

27 July 2019; 9:50	Vargas – Vasquez (El Salvador)	2–0	(Guatemala) Alvarado – Bethancourt	Estadio Voleibol de Playa – Court 2 Referees: Rocio Lai Delgado (DOM), Justo Ramón Benítez (PAR)
27 July 2019; 9:50	(21–15, 22–20); Report			Estadio Voleibol de Playa – Court 2 Referees: Rocio Lai Delgado (DOM), Justo Ramón Benítez (PAR)

==== 15th–16th place match ====
27 July 2019; 14:00	Charles – Valenciana (United States Virgin Islands)	0–2	(Guatemala) Alvarado – Bethancourt	Estadio Voleibol de Playa – Court 2 Referees: Hernan D. Lovera (COL), Erick Martínez (CUB)
27 July 2019; 14:00	(17–21, 8–21); Report			Estadio Voleibol de Playa – Court 2 Referees: Hernan D. Lovera (COL), Erick Martínez (CUB)

==== 13th–14th place match ====
28 July 2019; 13:10	Davidson – Grant (Trinidad and Tobago)	0–2	(El Salvador) Vargas – Vasquez	Estadio Voleibol de Playa – Court 2 Referees: Hernan D. Lovera (COL), Katrina Meyer (USA)
28 July 2019; 13:10	(20–22, 14–21)			Estadio Voleibol de Playa – Court 2 Referees: Hernan D. Lovera (COL), Katrina Meyer (USA)

=== Placement 9th–12th ===
9th–12th semifinals
Mendoza – Rodriguez (NCA)	1
Allcca – Mendoza (PER)	2
Harnett – Lapointe (CAN)	2
Orellana – Revuelta (MEX)	0

9th–10th place match
Allcca – Mendoza (PER)	0
Harnett – Lapointe (CAN)	2
11th–12th place match
Mendoza – Rodriguez (NCA)	0
Orellana – Revuelta (MEX)	2

==== 9th–12th semifinals ====
28 July 2019; 9:00	Mendoza – Rodriguez (Nicaragua)	1–2	(Peru) Allcca – Mendoza	Estadio Voleibol de Playa – Court 2 Referees: Claudia Guerrero (HON), Sergio Cifuentes (GUA)
28 July 2019; 9:00	(21–18, 22–24, 11–15)			Estadio Voleibol de Playa – Court 2 Referees: Claudia Guerrero (HON), Sergio Cifuentes (GUA)

28 July 2019; 9:50	Harnett – Lapointe (Canada)	2–0	(Mexico) Orellana – Revuelta	Estadio Voleibol de Playa – Court 2 Referees: Diego M. Medina (ARG), Elvin Ryan Germain (LCA)
28 July 2019; 9:50	(21–16, 21–17)			Estadio Voleibol de Playa – Court 2 Referees: Diego M. Medina (ARG), Elvin Ryan Germain (LCA)

==== 11th–12th place match ====
28 July 2019; 14:00	Mendoza – Rodriguez (Nicaragua)	0–2	(Mexico) Orellana – Revuelta	Estadio Voleibol de Playa – Court 2 Referees: Roccio Lai Delgado (DOM), Erick Martínez (CUB)
28 July 2019; 14:00	(16–21, 18–21); Report			Estadio Voleibol de Playa – Court 2 Referees: Roccio Lai Delgado (DOM), Erick Martínez (CUB)

==== 9th–10th place match ====
29 July 2019; 9:50	Allcca – Mendoza (Peru)	0–2	(Canada) Harnett – Lapointe	Estadio Voleibol de Playa – Court 2 Referees: Carolina Piston (URU), Rocio Lai Delgado (DOM)
29 July 2019; 9:50	(0–21, 0–21); Report			Estadio Voleibol de Playa – Court 2 Referees: Carolina Piston (URU), Rocio Lai Delgado (DOM)

- Peruvian team was injured and withdrew.

=== Placement 5th–8th ===
9th–12th semifinals
Araya – Valenciano (CRC)	0
Mardones – Rivas (CHI)	2
Ayala – Ríos (COL)	2
Caballero – Valiente (PAR)	0

5th–6th place match
Mardones – Rivas (CHI)	0
Ayala – Ríos (COL)	2
7th–8th place match
Araya – Valenciano (CRC)	0
Caballero – Valiente (PAR)	2

==== 5th–8th semifinals ====
29 July 2019; 12:20	Araya – Valenciano (Costa Rica)	0–2	(Chile) Mardones – Rivas	Estadio Voleibol de Playa – Court 1 Referees: Sergio Silva Duarte (NCA), Hernan D. Lovera (COL)
29 July 2019; 12:20	(10–21, 9–21); Report			Estadio Voleibol de Playa – Court 1 Referees: Sergio Silva Duarte (NCA), Hernan D. Lovera (COL)

29 July 2019; 13:10	Ayala – Ríos (Colombia)	2–0	(Paraguay) Caballero – Valiente	Estadio Voleibol de Playa – Court 1 Referees: Claudia Vega (PER), Suzzane B. Lowry (USA)
29 July 2019; 13:10	(21–19, 21–16); Report			Estadio Voleibol de Playa – Court 1 Referees: Claudia Vega (PER), Suzzane B. Lowry (USA)

==== 7th–8th place match ====
30 July 2019; 10:00	Araya – Valenciano (Costa Rica)	0–2	(Paraguay) Caballero – Valiente	Estadio Voleibol de Playa – Court 2 Referees: Sergio Silva Duarte (NCA), Sergio Cifuentes (GUA)
30 July 2019; 10:00	(16–21, 20–22); Report			Estadio Voleibol de Playa – Court 2 Referees: Sergio Silva Duarte (NCA), Sergio Cifuentes (GUA)

==== 5th–6th place match ====
30 July 2019; 10:00	Mardones – Rivas (Chile)	0–2	(Colombia) Ayala – Ríos	Estadio Voleibol de Playa – Court 1 Referees: Carolina Piston (URU), Claudia Guerrero (HON)
30 July 2019; 10:00	(12–21, 19–21); Report			Estadio Voleibol de Playa – Court 1 Referees: Carolina Piston (URU), Claudia Guerrero (HON)

=== Placement 1st–4th ===
Quarterfinals qualifying
Araya – Valenciano (CRC)	2
Mendoza – Rodriguez (NCA)	0
Mardones – Rivas (CHI)	2
Allcca – Mendoza (PER)	0
Harnett – Lapointe (CAN)	1
Ayala – Ríos (COL)	2
Caballero – Valiente (PAR)	2
Orellana – Revuelta (MEX)	1

Quarterfinals
Delís – Martínez (CUB)	2
Araya – Valenciano (CRC)	0
Gallay – Pereyra (ARG)	2
Mardones – Rivas (CHI)	0
Horta – Lavalle (BRA)	2
Ayala – Ríos (COL)	0
Cook – Pardon (USA)	2
Caballero – Valiente (PAR)	0

Semifinals
Delís – Martínez (CUB)	0
Gallay – Pereyra (ARG)	2
Horta – Lavalle (BRA)	0
Cook – Pardon (USA)	2

Gold medal match
Gallay – Pereyra (ARG)	1
Cook – Pardon (USA)	2
Bronze medal match
Delís – Martínez (CUB)	0
Horta – Lavalle (BRA)	2

==== Quarterfinals qualifying ====
Losers of Quarterfinals qualifying are transferred to Placement 9th–12th.

27 July 2019; 9:00	Araya – Valenciano (Costa Rica)	2–0	(Nicaragua) Mendoza – Rodriguez	Estadio Voleibol de Playa – Court 1 Referees: Lino Salamanca (VEN), Carolina B. Piston (URU)
27 July 2019; 9:00	(21-14, 21–16); Report			Estadio Voleibol de Playa – Court 1 Referees: Lino Salamanca (VEN), Carolina B. Piston (URU)

27 July 2019; 9:50	Mardones – Rivas (Chile)	2–0	(Peru) Allcca – Mendoza	Estadio Voleibol de Playa – Court 1 Referees: Diego M. Medina (ARG), Eduardo A. Paiz (ESA)
27 July 2019; 9:50	(21–11, 21–17); Report			Estadio Voleibol de Playa – Court 1 Referees: Diego M. Medina (ARG), Eduardo A. Paiz (ESA)

27 July 2019; 12:20	Harnett – Lapointe (Canada)	1–2	(Colombia) Ayala – Ríos	Estadio Voleibol de Playa – Court 1 Referees: Claudia Vega (PER), Sergio Silva Duarte (NCA)
27 July 2019; 12:20	(21–15, 14–21, 10–15); Report			Estadio Voleibol de Playa – Court 1 Referees: Claudia Vega (PER), Sergio Silva Duarte (NCA)

27 July 2019; 13:10	Caballero – Valiente (Paraguay)	2–1	(Mexico) Orellana – Revuelta	Estadio Voleibol de Playa – Court 1 Referees: Carolian Piston (URU), Sergio Cifuentes (GUA)
27 July 2019; 13:10	(13–21, 21–16, 16–14); Report			Estadio Voleibol de Playa – Court 1 Referees: Carolian Piston (URU), Sergio Cifuentes (GUA)

==== Quarterfinals ====
Losers of Quarterfinals are transferred to Placement 5th–8th.

28 July 2019; 9:00	Delís – Martínez (Cuba)	2–0	(Costa Rica) Araya – Valenciano	Estadio Voleibol de Playa – Court 1 Referees: Marlene Hernández (MEX), Hernan D. Lovera (COL)
28 July 2019; 9:00	(21–17, 21–14); Report			Estadio Voleibol de Playa – Court 1 Referees: Marlene Hernández (MEX), Hernan D. Lovera (COL)

28 July 2019; 9:50	Gallay – Pereyra (Argentina)	2–0	(Chile) Mardones – Rivas	Estadio Voleibol de Playa – Court 1 Referees: Sergio Silva Duarte (NCA), Justo Ramón Benítez (PAR)
28 July 2019; 9:50	(22–20, 21–18)			Estadio Voleibol de Playa – Court 1 Referees: Sergio Silva Duarte (NCA), Justo Ramón Benítez (PAR)

28 July 2019; 12:20	Horta – Lavalle (Brazil)	2–0	(Colombia) Ayala – Ríos	Estadio Voleibol de Playa – Court 1 Referees: Claudia Vega (PER), Eduardo A. Paiz (ESA)
28 July 2019; 12:20	(21–17, 21–13); Report			Estadio Voleibol de Playa – Court 1 Referees: Claudia Vega (PER), Eduardo A. Paiz (ESA)

28 July 2019; 13:10	Cook – Pardon (United States)	2–0	(Paraguay) Caballero – Valiente	Estadio Voleibol de Playa – Court 1 Referees: Carolina Piston (URU), Marlene Hernández (MEX)
28 July 2019; 13:10	(21–8, 21–10)			Estadio Voleibol de Playa – Court 1 Referees: Carolina Piston (URU), Marlene Hernández (MEX)

==== Semifinals ====
29 July 2019; 10:40	Delís – Martínez (Cuba)	0–2	(Argentina) Gallay – Pereyra	Estadio Voleibol de Playa – Court 1 Referees: Claudia Guerrero (HON), Claudia Vega (PER)
29 July 2019; 10:40	(19–21, 22–24); Report			Estadio Voleibol de Playa – Court 1 Referees: Claudia Guerrero (HON), Claudia Vega (PER)

29 July 2019; 11:30	Horta – Lavalle (Brazil)	0–2	(United States) Cook – Pardon	Estadio Voleibol de Playa – Court 1 Referees: Eduardo A. Paiz (ESA), Carolina Piston (URU)
29 July 2019; 11:30	(22–24, 18–21); Report			Estadio Voleibol de Playa – Court 1 Referees: Eduardo A. Paiz (ESA), Carolina Piston (URU)

==== Bronze medal match ====
30 July 2019; 12:30	Delís – Martínez (Cuba)	0–2	(Brazil) Horta – Lavalle	Estadio Voleibol de Playa – Court 1 Referees: Diego M. Medina (ARG), Carolina Piston (URU)
30 July 2019; 12:30	(19–21, 18–21)			Estadio Voleibol de Playa – Court 1 Referees: Diego M. Medina (ARG), Carolina Piston (URU)

==== Gold medal match ====
30 July 2019; 13:30	Gallay – Pereyra (Argentina)	1–2	(United States) Cook – Pardon	Estadio Voleibol de Playa – Court 1 Referees: Marcos Braga (BRA), Claudia Vega (PER)
30 July 2019; 13:30	(21–14, 20–22, 10–15)			Estadio Voleibol de Playa – Court 1 Referees: Marcos Braga (BRA), Claudia Vega (PER)

== Final standings ==
Rank	Team
1st place, gold medalist(s)	Karissa Cook – Jace Pardon (USA)
2nd place, silver medalist(s)	Ana Gallay – Fernanda Pereyra (ARG)
3rd place, bronze medalist(s)	Carolina Horta – Ângela Lavalle (BRA)
4	Maylen Delís – Leila Martínez (CUB)
5	Yuly Ayala – Diana Ríos (COL)
6	Maria Mardones – Maria Rivas (CHI)
7	Patricia Caballero – Michelle Valiente (PAR)
8	Marcela Araya – Valeria Valenciano (CRC)
9	Amanda Harnett – Marie-Christine Lapointe (CAN)
10	Lisbeth Allcca – Medalyn Mendoza (PER)
11	Zayra Orellana – Martha Revuelta (MEX)
12	Swan Mendoza – Lolette Rodriguez (NCA)
13	María Vargas – Kathya Vasquez (ESA)
14	Malika Davidson – Rheeza Grant (TTO)
15	Paola Alvarado – Estefanie Bethancourt (GUA)
16	Mannika Charles – Melanie Valenciana (ISV)
