= Trinidad and Tobago at the 2019 Pan American Games =

- IOC code: TTO
- NOC: Trinidad and Tobago Olympic Committee

in Lima, Peru 26 July–11 August, 2019
- Competitors: 98 in 18 sports
- Flag bearer: Andrew Lewis (opening)
- Medals Ranked 17th: Gold 1 Silver 7 Bronze 3 Total 11

Pan American Games appearances (overview)
- 1951; 1955; 1959; 1963; 1967; 1971; 1975; 1979; 1983; 1987; 1991; 1995; 1999; 2003; 2007; 2011; 2015; 2019; 2023

Trinidad and Tobago competed in the 2019 Pan American Games in Lima, Peru from July 26 to August 11, 2019.

On July 12, 2019, named a team of 98 athletes (58 men and 48 women) competing in 18 sports.

During the opening ceremony of the games, sailor Andrew Lewis carried the flag of the country as part of the parade of nations.

== Competitors ==
The following is the list of number of competitors (per gender) participating at the games per sport/discipline.

Sport	Men	Women	Total
Archery	1	0	1
Badminton	0	1	1
Boxing	4	0	4
Canoeing	2	0	2
Cycling	10	2	12
Field hockey	16	0	16
Judo	0	1	1
Rugby sevens	0	12	12
Sailing	1	1	1
Shooting	3	1	4
Table tennis	0	1	1
Taekwondo	0	1	1
Volleyball	2	2	4
Total	40	22	62

== Medalists ==
Medal	Name	Sport	Event	Date
Bronze	Michael Alexander	Boxing	Men's 64 kg	July 30

== Archery ==
Trinidad and Tobago qualified one male archer.

Men

Athlete	Event	Ranking round		Round of 32	Round of 16	Quarterfinal	Semifinal	Final / BM	
Athlete	Event	Score	Rank	Opposition Result	Opposition Result	Opposition Result	Opposition Result	Opposition Result	Rank
Daniel Catariz	Individual recurve	649	20	H Franco (CUB); L 1–7	Did not advance				

== Badminton ==
Trinidad and Tobago qualified a team of two badminton athletes (one per gender). The country later declined the men's quota.

Women

Athlete	Event	Round of 64	Round of 32	Round of 16	Quarterfinals	Semifinals	Final	Rank
Athlete	Event	Opposition Result	Opposition Result	Opposition Result	Opposition Result	Opposition Result	Opposition Result	Rank
Nekeisha Blake	Singles	Bye	Mata (MEX); L (6–21, 12–21)	did not advance				

== Boxing ==
Trinidad and Tobago qualified four male boxers.

Men

Athlete	Event	Quarterfinal	Semifinal	Final	
Athlete	Event	Opposition Result	Opposition Result	Opposition Result	Rank
Michael Alexander	-64 kg	E Sánchez (CRC); W 3–1	K Davis (USA); L 0–5	Did not advance	3rd place, bronze medalist(s)
Tyron Thomas	-69 kg	R Polanco (DOM); L 0–5	Did not advance		
Aaron Prince	-75 kg	L Lesther Espino (NCA); L RSC	Did not advance		
Nigel Paul	+91 kg	C Salcedo (COL); L 0–5	Did not advance		

== Canoeing ==
=== Sprint ===
Men

Athlete	Event	Heat		Semifinal		Final	
Athlete	Event	Time	Rank	Time	Rank	Time	Rank
Nicholas Robinson	K-1 200 m	41.328	6 SF	40.613	7	Did not advance	
Matthew Robinson	K-1 1000 m	4.33.159	8	Did not advance			
Matthew Robinson; Nicholas Robinson	K-2 1000 m	4:12.806	6 SF	4:17.392	7	Did not advance	

== Cycling ==
=== Road ===
Men

Athlete	Event	Time	Rank
Akil Campbell	Road race	Did not finish	
Tyler Coe	Road race	Did not finish	
Kemp Orosco	Road race	Did not finish	
Jovian Gomez	Road race	Did not finish	
Tyler Coe	Time trial	50:14.88	16
Jovian Gomez	Time trial	55:25.84	20

Women

Athlete	Event	Time	Rank
Teniel Campbell	Road race	2:19:50	2nd place, silver medalist(s)
Alexi Costa	Road race	2:20:24	21
Teniel Campbell	Time trial	24:50.24	2nd place, silver medalist(s)
Alexi Costa	Time trial	27:53.69	16

=== Track ===
Sprint

Athlete	Event	Qualification		Round of 16	Repechage 1	Quarterfinals	Semifinals	Final	
Athlete	Event	Time	Rank	Opposition Time	Opposition Time	Opposition Result	Opposition Result	Opposition Result	Rank
Nicholas Paul	Men's	9.808	1 Q	Archambault (CAN); W	Bye	Fonseca (BRA); W 2-0	Fonseca (COL); W 2-1	Phillip (TTO); W 2-0	1st place, gold medalist(s)
Njisane Phillip	Men's	10.087	2 Q	Sánchez (VEN); W	Bye	Fonseca (COL); W 2-0	Canelón (VEN); W 2-0	Paul (TTO); L 0-2	DSQ
Keron Bramble; Nicholas Paul; Njisane Phillip	Men's team	44.260	1 QA	—N/a				Murillo (COL); Quintero (COL); Rodríguez (COL); W	DSQ

Team pursuit

Athlete	Event	Qualifying		Elimination	Final / BM	
Athlete	Event	Time	Rank	Opposition Result	Opposition Result	Rank
Tyler Cole; Jovian Gómez; Kemp Orosco; Jabari Whiteman	Men's	4:24.216	6	Did not advance		

Keirin

Athlete	Event	Heats	Repechage	Final
Athlete	Event	Rank	Rank	Rank
Kwesi Browne	Men's	1QF	—N/a	6

Omnium

Athlete	Event	Scratch race		Tempo race		Elimination race		Points race		Total	
Athlete	Event	Rank	Points	Points	Rank	Rank	Points	Points	Rank	Points	Rank
Akil Campbell	Men's	9	24	6	30	9	24	7	20	98	7
Alexi Costa	Women's	8	26	9	24	8	26	10	0	76	8

Madison

Athlete	Event	Points	Rank
Akil Campbell; Tyler Cole	Men's	-13	8
Alexi Costa; Teniel Campbell	Women's	Did not start	

== Field hockey ==
Trinidad and Tobago qualified a men's team of 16 athletes, by being ranked among the top three unqualified nations from the 2017 Men's Pan American Cup.

=== Men's tournament ===
Preliminary round

Pos	Team	Pld	W	D	L	GF	GA	GD	Pts	Qualification
1	Argentina	3	3	0	0	20	1	+19	9	Quarter-finals
2	Chile	3	2	0	1	7	5	+2	6	Quarter-finals
3	Cuba	3	1	0	2	3	15	−12	3	Quarter-finals
4	Trinidad and Tobago	3	0	0	3	2	11	−9	0	Quarter-finals

Source: FIH

30 July 2019
12:00

Trinidad and Tobago	2–3	Cuba
Browne 19'; Pierre 48'	Report	Consuegra 22', 50'; Aguliera 51'

Umpires:
Tyler Klenk (CAN)
Benjamin Peters (USA)

1 August 2019
16:00

Trinidad and Tobago	0–6	Argentina
	Report	Tolini 3'; Mazzilli 25', 45'; Paredes 29'; Casella 41'; Martínez 49'

Umpires:
Deepak Joshi (IND)
Rodrigo Rivadeneira (PER)

3 August 2019
10:00

Chile	2–0	Trinidad and Tobago
Rodriguez 15'; Amoroso 37'	Report

Umpires:
Tyler Klenk (CAN)
Jonathan Altamirano (MEX)

Quarter-finals

5 August 2019
20:15

Trinidad and Tobago	1–5	Canada
Browne 6'	Report	I. Smythe 2'; Pearson 10'; Bissett 47'; Tupper 49', 56'

Umpires:
Deepak Joshi (IND)
Gus Soteriades (USA)

Cross over

8 August 2019
11:45

Mexico	0–3	Trinidad and Tobago
	Report	Te. Marcano 43', 47'; Ta. Marcano 47'

Umpires:
Benjamin Peters (USA)
Reinier Diaz (CUB)

Fifth place match

10 August 2019
11:45

Cuba	1–2	Trinidad and Tobago
Calderon 22'	Report	James 10'; Te. Mercano 17'

Umpires:
Deepak Joshi (IND)
Hugo Romero (PAR)

== Judo ==
Trinidad and Tobago qualified one female judoka.

Women

Athlete	Event	Preliminaries	Quarterfinals	Semifinals	Repechage	Final / BM	
Athlete	Event	Opposition Result	Opposition Result	Opposition Result	Opposition Result	Opposition Result	Rank
Gabriella Wood	+78 kg						

== Rowing ==
Women

Athlete	Event	Heat		Repechage		Final	
Athlete	Event	Time	Rank	Time	Rank	Time	Rank
Felice Chow	Single sculls	7:48.79	1 FA	Bye		7:46.53	2nd place, silver medalist(s)

== Rugby sevens ==
Trinidad and Tobago qualified a women's team of 12 athletes, by finishing as runner ups at the 2018 RAN Women's Sevens. This will mark the country's debut in the sport at the Pan American Games.

=== Women's tournament ===
Pool stage

Pos	Team	Pld	W	D	L	PF	PA	PD	Pts	Qualification
1	United States	3	3	0	0	142	0	+142	9	Semifinals
2	Colombia	3	2	0	1	62	62	0	7	Semifinals
3	Argentina	3	1	0	2	55	73	−18	5	5–8th place semifinals
4	Trinidad and Tobago	3	0	0	3	10	134	−124	3	5–8th place semifinals

Source: Lima 2019
Rules for classification: 1) Points; 2) Head-to-head result; 3) Point difference; 4) Points scored; 5) draw.

26 July 2019
10:15

United States	55–0	Trinidad and Tobago
Try: Emba (2) 1'm, 6'c Canett 3'c Kirshe (2) 5'm, 7'm Rovetti 8'm Ramsey (2) 10'c, 12'c, 14'c Con: Olsen (3/5) 4', 13', 14'; Canett (1/3) 7'; Emba (1/1) 10'	Report

Villa María del Triunfo Sports Center
Referee: Nerea Livoni (Argentina)

27 July 2019
10:10

Colombia	38–10	Trinidad and Tobago
Try: Soto 1'c Mejia 2'c Arzuaga (2) 5'c, 7'c Lopera 7'm Acevado 10'; Con: Lopera (4/5) 1', 2', 5', 7'	Report	Try: Glasgow 6'm John 14'm Con: Jack (0/1); Pantor (0/1)

Villa María del Triunfo Sports Center
Referee: Nayara Santos (Brazil)

27 July 2019
14:00

Argentina	41–0	Trinidad and Tobago
Try: Casas 1'm A. Moreno 3'c Trigo 4'm Montero 4'm Pedrozo 7'c Genghini 9'c Mattus 12'm Corzo 13'm Con: Padellaro (1/4) 3'; Aguilar (2/4) 8', 9'	Report

Villa María del Triunfo Sports Center
Referee: Nayara Santos (Brazil)

5th–8th classification

28 July 2019
9:10

Peru	31–10	Trinidad and Tobago
Try: Ratto 1'c Flores (2) 4'm, 7'm Quesada 9'c Masias 12'c Con: Quesada (3/5) 1', 9', 12'	Report	Try: Kintiba (2) 5'm, 10'm Con: Jack (0/2)

Villa María del Triunfo Sports Center
Referee: Nerea Livoni (Argentina)

Seventh place match

28 July 2019
13:00

Trinidad and Tobago	0–22	Mexico
	Report	Try: Tovar 1'c Cabrera 4'm Salomón 8'm Gonzalez-Berazueta 13'm Con: Gonzalez-Berazueta (1/4) 2'

Villa María del Triunfo Sports Center
Referee: Nerea Livoni (Argentina)

== Sailing ==
Men

Athlete	Event	Race											Total	
Athlete	Event	1	2	3	4	5	6	7	8	9	10	M	Points	Rank
Andrew Lewis	Laser	9	5	~~15~~	5	3	6	5	9	10	10	20	82	7

Women

Athlete	Event	Race											Total	
Athlete	Event	1	2	3	4	5	6	7	8	9	10	M	Points	Rank
Kelly-Ann Arrindell	Laser radial	7	12	8	12	~~14~~	5	11	11	11	12	—N/a	89	12

== Shooting ==
Men

Athlete	Event	Qualification		Final	
Athlete	Event	Points	Rank	Points	Rank
Roger Daniel	10 m air pistol	565	13	Did not advance	
Roger Daniel	25 m rapid fire pistol	538	18	Did not advance	
Anthony Maraj	Trap	43	31	Did not advance	
Robert Auerbach Jr	Skeet	117	10	Did not advance	

Women

Athlete	Event	Qualification		Final	
Athlete	Event	Points	Rank	Points	Rank
Marsha Jones	10 m air pistol	533	25	Did not advance	
Marsha Jones	25 m pistol	497	26	Did not advance	

== Table tennis ==
Trinidad and Tobago qualified one female table tennis athlete.

Women

Athlete	Event	Round of 32	Round of 16	Quarterfinals	Semifinals	Final	Rank
Athlete	Event	Opposition Result	Opposition Result	Opposition Result	Opposition Result	Opposition Result	Rank
Rheann Chung	Singles	Brito (DOM); L 1–4	did not advance				

== Taekwondo ==
Trinidad and Tobago received one wildcard in the women's +67 kg event.

Kyorugi
Women

Athlete	Event	Round of 16	Quarterfinals	Semifinals	Repechage	Final / BM	Rank
Athlete	Event	Opposition Result	Opposition Result	Opposition Result	Opposition Result	Opposition Result	Rank
Megan Lawrence	+67 kg	Mosquera (COL); L 1–22	did not advance		Gorman-Shore (USA); L 6–15	Did not advance	=7

== Volleyball ==
=== Beach ===
Trinidad and Tobago qualified four beach volleyball athletes (two men and two women).

Athlete	Event	Group stage				Round of 16	Quarterfinal	Semifinal	Final / BM	
Athlete	Event	Opposition Result	Opposition Result	Opposition Result	Rank	Opposition Result	Opposition Result	Opposition Result	Opposition Result	Rank
Daynte Stewart; Marlon Phillip	Men's	Capogrosso – Azaad (ARG); L 0–2 (15–21, 7–21)	Satterfield – Burik (USA); L 0–2 (13–21, 16–21)	Escobar – Vargas (ESA); L 0–2 (19–21, 13–21)	4	Bye		13th-16th classification Alpizar – Valenciano (CRC); L 1–2 (21–19, 16–21, 12–15)	15th place match Vásquez – Seminario (PER); W 2–0 (21–19, 21–16)	15
Malika Davidson; Rheeza Grant	Women's	Pardon – Cook (USA); L 0–2 (9–21, 8–21)	Ayala – Ríos (COL); L 2–0 (9–21, 12–21)	Valenciano – Araya (CRC); L 0–2 (18–21, 20–22)	4	Bye		13th-16th classification Valenciana – Charles (ISV); W 2–0 (21–8, 21–10)	13th place match Vásquez – Vargas (ESA); L 0–2 (20–22, 14–21)	14

== See also ==
- Trinidad and Tobago at the 2020 Summer Olympics
