= Cycling at the 2019 Pan American Games – Qualification =

The following is the qualification system and qualified countries for the cycling at the 2019 Pan American Games competition in Lima, Peru.

== Qualification system ==
A total of 250 (143 men and 107 women) cyclists will qualify to compete. 160 will qualify in road/track, 34 in mountain biking and 56 in BMX. Various events and rankings were used to determine the qualifiers. A nation could enter a maximum of 26 athletes, four in mountain biking (two per gender), six in BMX (three per gender) and a combined 16 for road and track (ten men and six women). Peru as host nation, was automatically awarded the maximum quota of 26 spots.

Event	Men	Women	Total
BMX racing	24	16	40
BMX freestyle	8	8	16
Mountain Biking	20	14	34
Road+Track	91	69	160
Total athletes	143	107	250

== Qualification timeline ==
Event	Date	Venue
BMX
UCI Individual Ranking	December 31, 2018	–
Mountain Bike
2018 Pan American Continental Championship	April 4–8, 2018	Pereira, Colombia
2018 South American Games	March 28 – June 8, 2018	Cochabamba, Bolivia
2018 Central American and Caribbean Games	July 21–29, 2018	Barranquilla, Colombia
Road/Track
2018 Pan American Road Cycling Championship	May 3–6, 2018	San Juan, Argentina
2018 South American Games	March 28 – June 8, 2018	Cochabamba, Bolivia
2018 Central American and Caribbean Games	July 21–29, 2018	Barranquilla, Colombia
2018 Pan American Track Cycling Championships	August 29 – September 2, 2018	Aguascalientes, Mexico
2018 Caribbean Road Cycling Championships	October 13–14, 2018	Santo Domingo, Dominican Republic

== Qualification summary ==
A total of 26 countries qualified cyclists after reallocation. The qualification charts below do not represent qualified countries after reallocation. Two additional quotas were assigned for unknown reasons.

Nation	BMX		Freestyle		Mountain		Road/Track		Total		
Nation	Men	Women	Men	Women	Men	Women	Men	Women	Men	Women	Total
Argentina	2	1	1	1	2	2	5	5	10	9	19
Aruba	1	1					1	1	2	2	4
Barbados								1		1	1
Bermuda								1		1	1
Bolivia	1								1		1
Brazil	2	2	1	1	2	1	5	2	10	6	16
Canada	1	2	1				2	6	4	8	12
Chile	2	1		1	2	1	7	5	11	8	19
Colombia	2	2		1	2	2	10	6	14	11	25
Costa Rica	1		1		2	2	1		5	2	7
Cuba						1	6	6	6	7	13
Dominican Republic							3	1	3	1	4
Ecuador	2	2	1	1	1	2	2	6	6	11	17
Guatemala	1	1			1		3	1	5	2	7
Honduras					1				1		1
Jamaica								1		1	1
Mexico	2			1	2	2	10	6	14	9	23
Panama							1		1		1
Peru	2	1	1		2	1	10	6	15	8	23
Puerto Rico					2				2		2
Saint Vincent and the Grenadines							1		1		1
Suriname							1		1		1
Trinidad and Tobago							10	5	10	5	15
United States	2	2	1	1			6	6	9	9	18
Uruguay							1	1	1	1	2
Venezuela	2		1	1	1		7	4	11	6	17
Total: 26 NOCs	24	16	8	8	20	14	91	69	143	107	252

== BMX ==
=== Racing ===
A maximum of 24 male and 16 female athletes will be allowed to compete in BMX racing. The host nation (Peru) automatically receives the maximum of two quota spots per event, and all other nations may qualify a maximum of two athletes per event. All qualification will be done using the UCI rankings as of December 31, 2018.

==== Men ====
Event	Quotas	Qualified
Host nation	2	Peru; Peru
UCI World Rankings	22	United States; Colombia; Brazil; United States; Venezuela; Argentina; Chile; Argentina; Colombia; Ecuador; Brazil; Canada; Canada; Bolivia; Ecuador; Venezuela; Mexico; Mexico; Aruba; Costa Rica; Guatemala; Bolivia
Total	24	

==== Women ====
Event	Quotas	Qualified
Host nation	2	Peru; Peru
UCI World Rankings	14	United States; Brazil; Canada; Ecuador; United States; Colombia; Canada; Brazil; Guatemala; Colombia; Ecuador; Aruba; Argentina; Chile
Total	16	

=== Freestyle ===
A maximum of eight male and eight female athletes will be allowed to compete in BMX freestyle. The host nation (Peru) automatically receives the maximum one quota spot per event, and all other nations may qualify a maximum of one athlete per event. All qualification will be done using the UCI rankings as of December 31, 2018.

==== Men ====
Event	Quotas	Qualified
Host nation	1	Peru
UCI World Rankings	7	United States; Venezuela; Costa Rica; Argentina; Canada; Brazil; Ecuador
Total	8	

==== Women ====
Event	Quotas	Qualified
Host nation	1	Peru
UCI World Rankings	6	United States; Chile; Argentina; Venezuela; Canada; Brazil
Reallocation	1	Ecuador
Total	8	

== Mountain biking ==
A maximum of 20 male and 14 female athletes will be allowed to compete in mountain biking. The host nation (Peru) automatically receives the maximum two quota spot per event, and all other nations may qualify a maximum of two athletes per event. Qualification was done across three tournaments. The defending champion in both events, Canada, decided not to compete in this discipline after the Pan American Championships date was changed at the last minute.

=== Men ===
Event	Quotas	Qualified
Host nation	2	Peru; Peru
Pan American Championships	16	Brazil; Costa Rica; Argentina; Brazil; Colombia; Argentina; Costa Rica; Colombia; Chile; Guatemala; Puerto Rico; United States; Venezuela; Mexico; Mexico; Chile
South American Games	1	Ecuador
Central American and Caribbean Games	1	Puerto Rico
Total	20	

=== Women ===
Event	Quotas	Qualified
Host nation	2	Peru; Peru
Pan American Championships	10	Brazil; United States; Mexico; Argentina; Colombia; Argentina; Costa Rica; Costa Rica; Ecuador; Ecuador
South American Games	1	Colombia
Central American and Caribbean Games	1	Mexico
Total	14	

== Road/Track ==
A maximum of 91 male and 69 female athletes will be allowed to compete in the road and track cycling events. The host nation (Peru) automatically receives the maximum 16 quotas (ten men and six women), and all other nations may qualify a maximum of 16 cyclists as well. Qualification was done across four tournaments. Like in mountain biking, the defending champion in some of the road events from 2015, Canada, decided not to enter any athletes in the discipline.

=== Men ===
Host

The host nation Peru, is permitted to enter 10 male cyclists.

Pan American Road Championships

At the Pan American Championships, the top five men in the individual time trial and top 12 in the road race qualified, for a total of 17.

Event	Quotas	Qualified
Time Trial	5	Colombia; Argentina; Guatemala; Colombia; Argentina
Road race	12	Colombia; Argentina; Chile; Guatemala; Uruguay; Costa Rica; Cuba; Brazil; Brazil; Venezuela; Cuba; Argentina
Total	17	

South American Games

The winner of each event, along with the top two in the road race qualified.

Event	Quotas	Qualified
Sprint	1	Colombia
Keirin	1	Venezuela
Omnium	1	Colombia
Madison	2	Chile; Chile
Team pursuit	4	Chile; Chile; Chile; Chile
Team sprint	3	Colombia; Colombia; Colombia
Time trial road	1	Colombia
Road race	2	Ecuador; Colombia
Total	15	

Central American and Caribbean Games

The winner of each event qualified.

Event	Quotas	Qualified
Sprint	1	Mexico
Keirin	1	Guatemala
Omnium	1	Trinidad and Tobago
Madison	2	Mexico; Mexico
Team pursuit	4	Mexico; Mexico; Mexico; Mexico
Team sprint	3	Trinidad and Tobago; Trinidad and Tobago; Trinidad and Tobago
Time trial road	1	Cuba
Road race	1	Panama
Total	14	

Pan American Track Championships

The top two in team pursuit, omnium and madison qualified, along with the top 3 in the other three events.

Event	Quotas	Qualified
Sprint	3	Trinidad and Tobago; United States; Ecuador
Keirin	3	Canada; Suriname; Mexico
Omnium	2	Venezuela; Ecuador
Madison	4	United States; United States; Chile; Chile
Team pursuit	8	United States; United States; United States; United States; Canada; Canada; Canada; Canada
Team sprint	9	Brazil; Brazil; Brazil; Venezuela; Venezuela; Venezuela; TBD
Total	29	

Caribbean Championships

The top two athletes in the time trial along with the four best in the road race qualified.

Event	Quotas	Qualified
Time Trial	2	Dominican Republic; Barbados
Road race	4	Dominican Republic; Cuba; Bermuda; Cuba
Total	6	

=== Women ===
Host

The host nation Peru, is permitted to enter 6 female cyclists.

Pan American Road Championships

At the Pan American Championships, the top three women in the individual time trial and top 10 in the road race qualified, for a total of 13.

Event	Quotas	Qualified
Time Trial	3	United States; United States; Colombia
Road race	10	Cuba; Cuba; Cuba; Cuba; Cuba; Chile; Argentina; Mexico; Uruguay; Cuba
Total	13	

South American Games

The winner of each event (except the madison), along with the top three in the road race qualified.

Event	Quotas	Qualified
Sprint	1	Colombia
Keirin	1	Colombia
Omnium	1	Argentina
Team pursuit	4	Chile; Chile; Chile; Chile
Team sprint	2	Colombia; Colombia
Time trial road	1	Colombia
Road race	2	Venezuela; Venezuela; Venezuela
Total	13	

Central American and Caribbean Games

The winner of each event qualified, except the madison. However, the team sprint was not held, meaning the quotas were transferred to the madison event.

Event	Quotas	Qualified
Sprint	1	Trinidad and Tobago
Keirin	1	Venezuela
Omnium	1	Mexico
Team pursuit	4	Mexico; Mexico; Mexico; Mexico
Madison	2	Venezuela; Venezuela
Time trial road	1	Trinidad and Tobago
Road race	1	Trinidad and Tobago
Total	14	

Pan American Track Championships

The top two in each event qualified

Event	Quotas	Qualified
Sprint	2	Argentina; Jamaica
Keirin	2	Guatemala; Chile
Omnium	2	United States; Barbados
Madison	4	Brazil; Brazil; Argentina; Argentina
Team pursuit	8	Canada; Canada; Canada; Canada; Ecuador; Ecuador; Ecuador; Ecuador
Team sprint	4	United States; United States; Canada; Canada
Total	22	

Caribbean Championships

The top two athletes in the time trial along with the two best in the road race qualified.

Event	Quotas	Qualified
Time Trial	2	Trinidad and Tobago; Bermuda
Road race	2	Dominican Republic; Belize
Total	4	
