= Trinidad and Tobago at the 2011 Pan American Games =

- IOC code: TRI
- NOC: Trinidad and Tobago Olympic Committee

in Guadalajara 14–30 October 2011
- Competitors: 96 in 14 sports
- Flag bearer: TBD
- Medals Ranked 21st: Gold 0 Silver 2 Bronze 2 Total 4

Pan American Games appearances (overview)
- 1951; 1955; 1959; 1963; 1967; 1971; 1975; 1979; 1983; 1987; 1991; 1995; 1999; 2003; 2007; 2011; 2015; 2019; 2023

Trinidad and Tobago will compete at the 2011 Pan American Games in Guadalajara, Mexico from October 14 to 30, 2011. Trinidad and Tobago will send 78 athletes in 14 sports.

== Medalists ==
Medal	Name	Sport	Event	Date
Silver	Roger Daniel	Shooting	Men's 10 metre air pistol	October 16
Silver	Cleopatra Borel	Athletics	Women's shot put	October 27
Bronze	Njisane Phillip	Cycling	Men's Individual Sprint Track	October 19
Bronze	Emmanuel Callender	Athletics	Men's 100 metres	October 25

== Athletics ==
Trinidad and Tobago has qualified 13 athletes.

=== Men ===
Track and road events

Event	Athletes	Heats		Semifinal		Final	
Event	Athletes	Time	Rank	Time	Rank	Time	Rank
100 m	Darryl Brown	10.63	5th	did not advance			
100 m	Emmanuel Callender	10.13	1st Q	10.17	2nd Q	10.16	3rd place, bronze medalist(s)
200 m	Moriba Morain	20.90	2nd Q	20.91	8th	did not advance	
800 m	Jamaal James			1:50.14	4th	did not advance	
400 m hurdles	Emmanuel Mayers			49.86 PB	2nd Q	50.00	6th
4 × 100 m relay	Emmanuel Callender; Joel Dillon; Jamol James; Moriba Morain			DNF		did not advance	

Field events

Event	Athletes	Semifinal		Final	
Event	Athletes	Result	Rank	Result	Rank
Discus throw	Quincy Wilson			DNS	
Javelin throw	Keshorn Walcott			75.77 m. PB	7th

=== Women ===
Track and road events

Event	Athletes	Semifinal		Final	
Event	Athletes	Result	Rank	Result	Rank
1500 m	Pila McShine			4:30.05	7th

Field events

Event	Athletes	Semifinal		Final	
Event	Athletes	Result	Rank	Result	Rank
Shot put	Cleopatra Borel-Brown			18.46 m. PB	2nd place, silver medalist(s)
Triple jump	Ayanna Alexander			13.54 m.	5th

== Beach volleyball ==
Trinidad and Tobago has qualified a women's team.

Athlete	Event	Preliminary round			Quarterfinals	Semifinals	Finals
Athlete	Event	Opposition Score	Opposition Score	Opposition Score	Opposition Score	Opposition Score	Opposition Score
Elki Phillip; Ayana Dyette	Women's	Larissa França (BRA); Juliana Silva (BRA); L 5-21, 16-21	Niriam Sinal (CUB); Onayamis Sinal (CUB); L 12-21, 14-21	Ketty Chila (ECU); Ariana Vilela (ECU); L 14-21, 23-21, 6-15	did not advance		

== Boxing ==
Trinidad and Tobago has qualified one male boxer.

Men

Athlete	Event	Round of 16	Quarterfinals	Semifinals	Final
Athlete	Event	Opposition Result	Opposition Result	Opposition Result	Opposition Result
Andrew Fermin	Middleweight	Juan Carlos Rodríguez (VEN); L RET R2 3:00	did not advance		

== Canoeing ==
Trinidad and Tobago has qualified one male athlete.

Men

Athlete	Event	Heats		Semifinals		Final	
Athlete	Event	Time	Rank	Time	Rank	Time	Rank
Satyam Maharaj	K-1 200 m	51.371	6th QS	49.285	6th	did not advance	

== Cycling ==
Trinidad and Tobago has qualified two cyclists.

=== Road Cycling ===
==== Men ====
Athlete	Event	Time	Rank
Abraham Emile	Road race	DNF	

=== Track cycling ===
==== Sprints & Pursuit ====
Athlete	Event	Qualifying		Round of 16	1/8 finals (repechage)	Quarterfinals	Semifinals	Final
Athlete	Event	Time Speed (km/h)	Rank	Opposition Time Speed	Opposition Time Speed	Opposition Time Speed	Opposition Time Speed	Opposition Time Speed
Njsane Phillips	Men's sprint	9.977 PR	1st	Alejandro Mainat (CUB); W 10.690		Michael Blatchford (USA); W 2-0	Hersony Canelón (VEN); L 0-2	Bronze medal match: Ángel Pulgar (VEN); W 2-0 (bronze)

== Field hockey ==
Trinidad and Tobago has qualified a men's and women's field hockey team. Each team will be made up of sixteen athletes for a total of thirty-two.

=== Men ===
Team

- Karlos Stephen
- Justin Pascal
- Darren Cowie
- Kwandwane Browne
- Aidan De Gannes
- Mickell Pierre
- Dwain Quan Chan
- Akim Toussaint
- Atiba Whittington
- Christopher Scipio
- Alan Henderson
- Andrew Vieira
- Shaquille Daniel
- Nicholas Grant
- Solomon Eccles
- Evan Piers Farrell

Pos	Team	Pld	W	D	L	GF	GA	GD	Pts	Qualification
1	Canada	3	3	0	0	21	2	+19	9	Semi-finals
2	Chile	3	2	0	1	12	6	+6	6	Semi-finals
3	Trinidad and Tobago	3	1	0	2	14	11	+3	3	
4	Barbados	3	0	0	3	2	30	−28	0	

Source: PAHF

October 20, 2011
09:00

Canada	7 – 2	Trinidad and Tobago
Guest 2', 37', 46'; Tupper 26'; Smythe 29', 30'; Wright 62'	Report	Scipio 1'; Browne 35'

Pan American Hockey Stadium
Umpires:
Barbas (ARG), Soteriades II (USA)

October 22, 2011
14:00

Trinidad and Tobago	11 – 1	Barbados
Browne 3', 16'; Pierre 6', 36'; Chan 23', 68'; Scipio 27', 42'; Whittington 37'; De Gannes 39'; Toussaint 60'	Report	Walcott 9'

Pan American Hockey Stadium
Umpires:
Hooper (GUY), Hundley (USA)

October 24, 2011
11:00

Trinidad and Tobago	1 – 3	Chile
Whittington 36'	Report	Richter 15'; Richter 51'; Rodriguez 65'

Pan American Hockey Stadium
Umpires:
Wright (RSA), Hundley (USA)

Elimination stage

Crossover

October 27, 2011
19:30

Trinidad and Tobago	0 – 2	United States
	Report	Sundeen 33', 63'

Pan American Hockey Stadium
Umpires:
Springer (BAR), Scala (ARG)

Seventh place match

October 29, 2011
09:00

Trinidad and Tobago	9 – 1	Barbados
Toussaint 8', 20', 52', 67', 69'; Scipio 13', 39', 68'; Browne 16'	Report	Small 45'

Pan American Hockey Stadium
Umpires:
Lopez (URU), Vazquez (MEX)

=== Women ===
Team

- Petal Derry
- Fiona O'Brien
- Michelle Leotaud
- Alanna Lewis
- Stephanie Whiteman
- Curlyne Wynn
- Lindsay Williams
- Kristin Thompson
- Avion Ashton
- Blair Wynne
- Alicia Waithe
- Brittney Hingh
- Charlene Williams
- Tamara De Nobriga
- Arielle DuQuensnay
- Kelli O'Brien

Team	Pld	W	D	L	GF	GA	GD	Pts
Argentina (A)	3	3	0	0	37	3	+34	9
Canada (A)	3	2	0	1	15	8	+7	6
Barbados	3	1	0	2	4	31	−27	3
Trinidad and Tobago	3	0	0	3	3	17	−14	0

(A) Advanced to the semifinals

October 19, 2011
09:00

Trinidad and Tobago	0 – 11	Argentina
	Report	García 2', 22'; Rebecchi 6', 61'; Luchetti 15'; Barrionuevo 21', 37', 39', 58'; Merino 29', 65'

Pan American Hockey Stadium
Umpires:
Metchette (IRL)
Sutton (USA)

October 21, 2011
14:00

Trinidad and Tobago	2 – 4	Barbados
Thompson 17'; Quesnay 37'	Report	King 9'; Clarke 15'; Warner 32'; Sealy61'

Pan American Hockey Stadium
Umpires:
Castellanos (MEX)
Cheng (TPE)

October 23, 2011
11:00

Trinidad and Tobago	1 – 2	Canada
Quesnay 8'	Report	Stairs 61'; Gillis 68'

Pan American Hockey Stadium
Umpires:
Judefind (USA)
Castellanos (MEX)

Elimination stage

Crossover

October 26, 2011
17:30

Cuba	2 – 1	Trinidad and Tobago
Carmenate 32'; Argentel 62'	Report	Wynne 8'

Pan American Hockey Stadium
Umpires:
Metchette (IRL), Castellanos (MEX)

Seventh place match

October 28, 2011
09:00

Barbados	1 – 3	Trinidad and Tobago
Warner 14'	Report	Wynne 24', 33'; Thompson 29'

Pan American Hockey Stadium
Umpires:
Montesino (CHI), Chenge (TPE)

== Football ==
Trinidad and Tobago has qualified a men's and women's football team. The team will be made up of 18 athletes.

=== Men ===
- Sheldon Bateau
- Trevin Casear
- Zane Coker
- Kaydion Gabriel
- Jamal Gay
- Joevin Jones
- Jayson Joseph
- Marcus Joseph
- Micah Lewis
- Andre Marchan
- Kevin Molino
- Kareem Moses
- Cameron Roget
- Leslie Russell
- Aquil Selby
- Jeromie Williams
- Mekeil Williams
- Shahdon Winchester

Men's team will participate in Group A of the football tournament.

Pos	Team	Pld	W	D	L	GF	GA	GD	Pts	Qualification
1	Mexico	3	2	1	0	8	4	+4	7	Advance to Semifinals
2	Uruguay	3	1	1	1	4	6	−2	4	Advance to Semifinals
3	Trinidad and Tobago	3	0	3	0	3	3	0	3	
4	Ecuador	3	0	1	2	2	4	−2	1	

October 21, 2011
20:00

Mexico	1 – 1	Trinidad and Tobago
Peralta 30'	Report	Gay 12'

Estadio Omnilife, Guadalajara
Referee: Omar Ponce (Ecuador)

October 23, 2011
10:00

Trinidad and Tobago	1 – 1	Ecuador
Casear 69'	Report	Quiñonez 17'

Estadio Omnilife, Guadalajara
Referee: David Gantar (Canada)

October 25, 2011*
10:00

Uruguay	1 – 1	Trinidad and Tobago
Abero 17'	Report	Winchester 10'

Estadio Omnilife, Guadalajara
Referee: Marlon Mejía (El Salvador)

=== Women ===
==== Team ====
- Kimika Forbes
- Shalette Alexander
- Karyn Forbes
- Tiana Bateau
- Arin King
- Danielle Blair
- Maylee Attin-Johnson
- Anastasia Prescott
- Victoria Swift
- Candice Edwards
- Kenya Cordner
- Lauryn Hutchinson
- Rhea Belgrave
- Tasha St. Louis
- Nadia James
- Ahkeela Malloon
- Dernelle Mascall
- Janine Françoise

==== Group A ====
Pos	Team	Pld	W	D	L	GF	GA	GD	Pts	Qualification
1	Colombia	3	2	0	1	2	1	+1	6	Advance to Semifinals
2	Mexico	3	1	2	0	2	1	+1	5	Advance to Semifinals
3	Chile	3	1	1	1	3	1	+2	4	
4	Trinidad and Tobago	3	0	1	2	1	5	−4	1	

October 18, 2011
14:00

Colombia	1 – 0	Trinidad and Tobago
Andrade 19'	Report

Estadio Omnilife, Guadalajara
Referee: Jessica Di Orio (Argentina)

October 20, 2011
20:00

Mexico	1 – 1	Trinidad and Tobago
Domínguez 41' (pen.)	Report	Attin-Johnson 20'

Estadio Omnilife, Guadalajara
Referee: Irasema Aguilera (Cuba)

October 22, 2011
10:00

Trinidad and Tobago	0 – 3	Chile
	Report	Lara 18'; Mardones 40'; Rojas 65'

Estadio Omnilife, Guadalajara
Referee: Jessica Di Orio (Argentina)

== Gymnastics ==
=== Artistic ===
Trinidad and Tobago has qualified a team of 1 woman.

Women
Individual qualification & Team Finals

Athlete	Event	Apparatus				Qualification		Final	
Athlete	Event	Vault	Uneven bars	Balance Beam	Floor	Total	Rank	Total	Rank
Thema Williams	Ind Qualification	12.375	11.350	10.825	11.050	45.600	40th		

Individual Finals

Athlete	Event	Apparatus				Final	
Athlete	Event	Vault	Uneven bars	Balance Beam	Floor	Total	Rank
Thema Williams	Individual All-around	12.900	11.550	10.925	11.675	47.050	20th

== Karate ==
Trinidad and Tobago has qualified one male karate athlete.

Athlete	Event	Round robin (Pool A/B)			Semifinals	Final
Athlete	Event	Match 1	Match 2	Match 3	Semifinals	Final
Athlete	Event	Opposition Result	Opposition Result	Opposition Result	Opposition Result	Opposition Result
Kwame Kinsale	Men's +84 kg	Nelson I. Gonzalez (PUR); HWK 0:0	Shaun Dhillon (CAN); HWK 0:0	Alberto A. Ramirez (MEX); L PTS 0:3	did not advance	

== Sailing ==
Trinidad and Tobago has qualified one sailor.

Men

Athlete	Event	Race											Net Points	Final Rank
Athlete	Event	1	2	3	4	5	6	7	8	9	10	M	Net Points	Final Rank
Andrew Lewis	Laser	10	7	9	7	13	10	14; OCS	8	5	12	/	81.0	10th

== Shooting ==
Trinidad and Tobago has qualified two shooters.

Men

Athlete	Event	Qualification		Final	
Athlete	Event	Score	Rank	Score	Rank
10 m air pistol	Roger Daniel	577-17x	2nd Q	676.1	2nd place, silver medalist(s)
50 m pistol	Roger Daniel	536- 6x	11th	did not advance	
Trap	Robert Auerbach	116	12th	did not advance	
Skeet	Robert Auerbach	117	12th	did not advance	

== Table tennis ==
Trinidad and Tobago has qualified one male and one female athlete in table tennis.

Men

Athlete	Event	Round robin			1st round	Eighthfinals	Quarterfinals	Semifinals	Final
Athlete	Event	Match 1	Match 2	Match 3	1st round	Eighthfinals	Quarterfinals	Semifinals	Final
Athlete	Event	Opposition Result	Opposition Result	Opposition Result	Opposition Result	Opposition Result	Opposition Result	Opposition Result	Opposition Result
Dexter St. Louis	Singles	Juan Acosta (PER); W 4 – 3	Marcelo Aguirre (PAR); L 1 – 4	Geovanny Coello (COL); W 4 – 3	Mark Hazinski (USA); W 4 – 1	Liu Song (ARG); L 1 – 4	did not advance		

Women

Athlete	Event	Round robin			Eighthfinals	Quarterfinals	Semifinals	Final
Athlete	Event	Match 1	Match 2	Match 3	Eighthfinals	Quarterfinals	Semifinals	Final
Athlete	Event	Opposition Result	Opposition Result	Opposition Result	Opposition Result	Opposition Result	Opposition Result	Opposition Result
Rheann Chung	Singles	Ariel Hsing (USA); L 2 – 4	Analdy Lopez (GUA); W 4 – 3	Ruaida Ezzeddine (VEN); L 2 – 4	did not advance			

== Taekwondo ==
Trinidad and Tobago has qualified one athlete.

Men

Athlete	Event	Round of 16	Quarterfinals	Semifinals	Final
Athlete	Event	Opposition Result	Opposition Result	Opposition Result	Opposition Result
Lenn Hypolite	Middleweight (-80kg)	Carlos Vásquez (VEN); L 3 – 15	did not advance		
