= Trinidad and Tobago at the 2015 Pan American Games =

- IOC code: TTO
- NOC: Trinidad and Tobago Olympic Committee

in Toronto, Canada 10–26 July 2015
- Competitors: 111 in 14 sports
- Flag bearer (opening): Roger Daniel
- Flag bearer (closing): Mikel Thomas
- Medals Ranked 15th: Gold 3 Silver 3 Bronze 2 Total 8

Pan American Games appearances (overview)
- 1951; 1955; 1959; 1963; 1967; 1971; 1975; 1979; 1983; 1987; 1991; 1995; 1999; 2003; 2007; 2011; 2015; 2019; 2023

Trinidad and Tobago competed in the 2015 Pan American Games in Toronto, Canada from July 10 to 26, 2015.

Sport shooter Roger Daniel was the flagbearer for the team during the opening ceremony.

== Competitors ==
The following table lists Trinidad and Tobago's delegation per sport and gender.

Sport	Men	Women	Total
Athletics	17	15	32
Badminton	1	0	1
Beach volleyball	2	2	4
Boxing	0	1	1
Cycling	5	0	5
Field hockey	16	0	16
Football (soccer)	18	18	36
Golf	2	2	4
Gymnastics	1	1	2
Judo	1	0	11
Sailing	1	1	2
Shooting	3	0	3
Swimming	3	0	3
Taekwondo	1	0	1
Total	71	40	111

== Medalists ==
Medal	Name(s)	Sport	Event	Date
Gold	Cleopatra Borel	Athletics	Women's shot put	July 22
Gold	Keshorn Walcott	Athletics	Men's javelin throw	July 24
Gold	Machel Cedenio; Emanuel Mayers; Renny Quow; Jarrin Solomon; Jehue Gordon	Athletics	Men's 4 x 400 metres relay	July 25
Silver	Njisane Phillip	Cycling	Men's sprint	July 18
Silver	Machel Cedenio	Athletics	Men's 400 metres	July 23
Silver	Mikel Thomas	Athletics	Men's 110 metres hurdles	July 24
Bronze	George Bovell	Swimming	Men's 50 metres freestyle	July 17
Bronze	Keston Bledman; Emmanuel Callender; Rondel Sorrillo; Dan-Neil Telesford; Mikel Thomas	Athletics	Men's 4 x 100 metres relay	July 25

== Athletics ==
Trinidad and Tobago qualified 32 athletes (17 men and 15 women). Lalonde Gordon, Jessica James, Lisa Wickham and Peli Alzola were named to the team as part of the relay events, but did not compete.

Key

- Note–Ranks given for track events are for the entire round
- Q = Qualified for the next round
- q = Qualified for the next round as a fastest loser or, in field events, by position without achieving the qualifying target
- NR = National record
- GR = Games record
- PB = Personal best
- DNF = Did not finish
- NM = No mark
- N/A = Round not applicable for the event
- Bye = Athlete not required to compete in round

Men
Track events

Athlete	Event	Heats		Semifinal		Final	
Athlete	Event	Result	Rank	Result	Rank	Result	Rank
Keston Bledman	100 m	9.95	1 Q	10.10	3 Q	10.12	4
Marcus Duncan	100 m	10.52	21	Did not advance			
Kyle Greaux	200 m	20.75	19 Q	20.69	14	Did not advance	
Rondel Sorrillo	200 m	20.63	15 q	20.61	11	Did not advance	
Machel Cedenio	400 m	—N/a		46.06	4 Q	44.70	2nd place, silver medalist(s)
Jarrin Solomon	400 m	—N/a		46.16	6 Q	45.20	5
Mikel Thomas	110 m hurdles	—N/a		13.44	6 Q	13.17 NR	2nd place, silver medalist(s)
Emanuel Mayers	400 m hurdles	—N/a		50.81	9	Did not advance	
Keston Bledman; Emmanuel Callender; Rondel Sorrillo; Dan-Neil Telesford; Mikel Thomas*	4 x 100 metres relay	—N/a		38.52	4 Q	38.69	3rd place, bronze medalist(s)
Machel Cedenio; Emanuel Mayers; Renny Quow; Jarrin Solomon; Jehue Gordon	4 x 400 metres relay	—N/a		3:01.58 SB	3	2:59.60 SB	1st place, gold medalist(s)

- Athletes who raced in the semifinal only and received a medal.

Field events

Athlete	Event	Final	
Athlete	Event	Distance	Position
Elton Walcott	Triple jump	16.15	9
Quincy Wilson	Discus throw	43.65	10
Shakeil Waithe	Javelin throw	73.21	12
Keshorn Walcott	Javelin throw	83.27	1st place, gold medalist(s)

Women
Track events

Athlete	Event	Heats		Semifinal		Final	
Athlete	Event	Result	Rank	Result	Rank	Result	Rank
Kelly-Ann Baptiste	100 m	11.07	4 Q	11.05	4 Q	11.05	5
Semoy Hackett	100 m	11.17 SB	8 Q	11.16 SB	8 q	11.16	8
Kamaria Durant	200 m	22.74 PB	1 Q	22.94	9	Did not advance	
Reyare Thomas	200 m	23.30	11 Q	22.88	8 q	23.32	7
Janeil Bellille	400 m	—N/a		54.41	13	Did not advance	
Alena Brooks	800 m	—N/a		2:07.82	10	Did not advance	
Josanne Lucas	400 m hurdles	—N/a		1:00.30	14	Did not advance	
Sparkle McKnight	400 m hurdles	—N/a		56.56 SB	2 Q	57.30	5
Kelly-Ann Baptiste; Kamaria Durant; Semoy Hackett; Reyare Thomas	4 x 100 metres relay	—N/a		DNF		Did not advance	
Janeil Bellille; Alena Brooks; Sparkle McKnight; Romona Modeste	4 x 400 metres relay	—N/a		3:31.21 SB	6 q	3:33.31	7

Field events

Athlete	Event	Final	
Athlete	Event	Distance	Position
Deandra Daniel	High jump	1.75	15
Ayanna Alexander	Triple jump	13.83	8
Cleopatra Borel	Shot put	18.67	1st place, gold medalist(s)

== Badminton ==
Trinidad and Tobago qualified a team of two athletes (one man and one woman). Trinidad and Tobago received an additional female quota after quotas were declined, but later rejected both female quotas.

Men

Athlete	Event	Round of 64	Round of 32	Round of 16	Quarterfinals	Semifinals	Final	
Athlete	Event	Opposition Score	Opposition Score	Opposition Score	Opposition Score	Opposition Score	Opposition Score	Rank
Nicholas Bonkowsky	Singles	Bye	Pongnairat (USA); L 8–21, 11–21	Did not advance				

== Beach volleyball ==
Trinidad and Tobago qualified a men's and women's pair for a total of four athletes.

Men's

Athlete	Event	Preliminary Round			Quarterfinals	Classification	Classification	Placement match
Athlete	Event	Opposition Score	Opposition Score	Opposition Score	Opposition Score	Opposition Score	Opposition Score	Rank
Fabien Whitfield; Daneil Williams	Men's	Haddock / Rodriguez (PUR); L (12–21, 15–21)	Grimalt / Grimalt (CHI); L (11–21, 20–22)	Talavera / Vargas (ESA); W (21–15, 26–24)	Ontiveros / Virgen (MEX); L (16–21, 9–21)	Lopez Alvarado / Mora Romero (CHI); W (23–21, 17–21, 15–13)	Henriquez / Fillavane (NCA); W (21–0, 21–0)	9
Ayana Dyette; Malika Davidson	Women's	Gallay / Klug (ARG); L (11–21, 13–21)	Candelas / Revuelta (MEX); L (23–25, 7–21)	Flores / Martinez (CUB); L (12–21, 9–21)	Did not advance	Power / Smith-Johnson (CAY); W (21–18, 21–18)	Orellana / Recinos (GUA); L (15–21, 16–21)	14

== Boxing ==
Trinidad and Tobago qualified one female boxer.

Women

Athlete	Event	Quarterfinals	Semifinals	Final	Rank
Athlete	Event	Opposition Result	Opposition Result	Opposition Result	Rank
Chimere Taylor	Light heavyweight	Guillén (DOM); L TKO	Did not advance		=5

== Cycling ==
Trinidad and Tobago qualified five cyclists (one in road and four in track).

=== Road ===
Men

Athlete	Event	Final	
Athlete	Event	Time	Rank
Emile Abraham	Road race	3:46:35	8
Emile Abraham	Time trial	Did not start	

=== Track ===
Sprint

Athlete	Event	Qualification		Round 1	Repechage 1	Quarterfinals	Semifinals	Final	
Athlete	Event	Time	Rank	Opposition Time Speed (km/h)	Opposition Time Speed (km/h)	Opposition Time Speed (km/h)	Opposition Time Speed (km/h)	Opposition Time Speed (km/h)	Rank
Njisane Phillip	Men's sprint	10.121	4 Q	Espinoza (USA); W	Bye	Veloce (CAN); W	Cipriano (BRA); W	Barrette (CAN); L	2nd place, silver medalist(s)
Justin Roberts	Men's sprint	10.463	13	Did not advance					
Jude Codrington; Njisane Phillip; Justin Roberts	Men's team sprint	45.381	5	—N/a				Did not advance	

Keirin

Athlete	Event	1st round	Final
Athlete	Event	Rank	Rank
Njisane Phillip	Men's keirin	2 Q	5

Omnium

Athlete	Event	Scratch race		Individual pursuit		Elimination race		Time trial		Flying lap		Points race		Total points	Rank
Athlete	Event	Rank	Points	Rank	Points	Rank	Points	Rank	Points	Rank	Points	Rank	Points	Total points	Rank
Varun Maharajh	Men's omnium	24	9	26	8	32	5	26	8	30	6	0	=0	138	9

== Field hockey ==
Trinidad and Tobago qualified a men's team of 16 athletes.

=== Men's tournament ===
Roster

The following is Trinidad and Tobago's men's field hockey squad for the 2015 Pan American Games.

Head Coach: Glen Francis

3. Christopher Scipio
4. Aidan de Gannes
5. Kiel Murray
6. Solomon Eccles
8. Stefan Mouttet
9. Akim Toussaint
11. Dillet Gilkes
12. Ishmael Campbell
14. Darren Cowie
18. Mickel Pierre
19. Shaquille Daniel
20. Jordan Reynos
21. Tariq Marcano
22. Kristien Emmanuel
23. Andrey Rocke
24. Dominic Young

Pool A

Pos	Team	Pld	W	D	L	GF	GA	GD	Pts	Qualification
1	Argentina	3	3	0	0	22	4	+18	9	Quarter-finals
2	United States	3	1	1	1	5	10	−5	4	Quarter-finals
3	Cuba	3	0	2	1	9	10	−1	2	Quarter-finals
4	Trinidad and Tobago	3	0	1	2	3	15	−12	1	Quarter-finals

Source: FIH
Rules for classification: 1) points; 2) matches won; 3) goal difference; 4) goals for; 5) head-to-head result.

14 July 2015
09:00

Argentina	11–0	Trinidad and Tobago
Peillat 26', 57'; Vila 29', 30', 34'; Paredes 37'; Della Torre 42'; Mazzili 56'; Callioni 57', 60'; Menini 59'	Report

Umpires:
You Suolong (CHN)
Federico Garcia (URU)

16 July 2015
09:00

Trinidad and Tobago	2–2	Cuba
Toussaint 51'; Eccles 59'	Report	Blanco 22', 53'

Umpires:
Daniel Basto Rivero (MEX)
Grant Hundley (USA)

18 July 2015
11:00

Trinidad and Tobago	1–2	United States
Campbell 14'	Report	Holt 6'; Grassi 13'

Umpires:
Francisco Vázquez (ESP)
You Suolong (CHN)

Quarterfinals

21 July 2015
19:30

Canada	3–0	Trinidad and Tobago
Smythe 3'; Sarmento 29'; Tupper 50'	Report

Umpires:
Francisco Vázquez (ESP)
Grant Hundley (USA)

Classification round
Semifinals

23 July 2015
11:00

United States	2–1	Trinidad and Tobago
Holt 27'; Sundeen 38'	Report	Marcano 36'

Umpires:
Gavin Caldecott (CAN)
Matias Barbosa (CHI)

Seventh place match

25 July 2015
09:00

Cuba	0–13	Trinidad and Tobago
	Report	Pierre 5', 13', 26'; Reynos 6', 47'; Murray 20', 35', 46'; Emmanuel 28'; Gilkes 31', 33'; Campbell 43'; Mouttet 44'

Umpires:
Matias Barbosa (CHI)
Saleem Aaron (USA)

== Football ==
Trinidad and Tobago qualified a men's and women's teams for a total of 36 athletes (18 male and 18 female).

=== Men's tournament ===
Roster

The roster for Trinidad and Tobago was as follows.

Head coach: (Montenegro) Zoran Vraneš

No.	Pos.	Player	Date of birth (age)	Club
1	GK	Montell Joseph	January 22, 1997 (aged 18)	(The Football Association) Forest United
2	DF	Shannon Gomez	October 5, 1996 (aged 18)	(Trinidad and Tobago Football Association) W Connection
3	DF	Maurice Ford	September 6, 1996 (aged 18)	(Trinidad and Tobago Football Association) W Connection
4	DF	Jesus Perez	September 11, 1995 (aged 19)	(Trinidad and Tobago Football Association) North East Stars
5	DF	Dario Holmes	February 9, 1994 (aged 21)	(Trinidad and Tobago Football Association) San Juan Jabloteh
6	MF	Neveal Hackshaw	September 21, 1995 (aged 19)	(Trinidad and Tobago Football Association) North East Stars
7	MF	Jomal Williams	April 28, 1994 (aged 21)	(Trinidad and Tobago Football Association) W Connection
8	DF	Triston Hodge	October 9, 1994 (aged 20)	(Trinidad and Tobago Football Association) W Connection
9	MF	Nathaniel Garcia	April 24, 1993 (aged 22)	(Trinidad and Tobago Football Association) Central FC
10	FW	Duane Muckette	July 1, 1995 (aged 20)	(United States Soccer Federation) South Florida University
11	FW	Shackeil Henry	April 2, 1994 (aged 21)	(Trinidad and Tobago Football Association) Point Fortin Civic
12	MF	Xavier Rajpaul	September 26, 1994 (aged 20)	(United States Soccer Federation) Charleston Cougars
13	FW	Ricardo John	April 10, 1995 (aged 20)	(United States Soccer Federation) Virginia Tech
14	MF	Jelani Felix	November 22, 1993 (aged 21)	(Trinidad and Tobago Football Association) Defence Force
15	FW	Neil Benjamin	August 20, 1994 (aged 20)	(Trinidad and Tobago Football Association) W Connection
16	DF	Alvin Jones	July 9, 1994 (aged 21)	(Trinidad and Tobago Football Association) W Connection
17	DF	Aikim Andrews	June 20, 1996 (aged 19)	(Trinidad and Tobago Football Association) W Connection
18	GK	Jovan Sample	April 13, 1995 (aged 20)	(Trinidad and Tobago Football Association) Central FC

Group B

Pos	Team	Pld	W	D	L	GF	GA	GD	Pts	Qualification
1	Mexico	3	2	1	0	6	3	+3	7	Medal round
2	Uruguay	3	2	0	1	5	1	+4	6	Medal round
3	Paraguay	3	1	1	1	6	3	+3	4	
4	Trinidad and Tobago	3	0	0	3	3	13	−10	0	

Source: Toronto 2015
July 13, 2015
17:35

Trinidad and Tobago	0–4	Uruguay
	Report	Formiliano 6'; Ricca 20'; Albarracín 31'; Lozano 69'

Hamilton Pan Am Soccer Stadium, Hamilton
Referee: Oscar Reyna (Guatemala)

July 17, 2015
20:35

Paraguay	5–1	Trinidad and Tobago
Ferreira 63', 71'; Ramírez 65'; Alegre 76'; Aranda 79'	Report	Garcia 53'

Hamilton Pan Am Soccer Stadium, Hamilton
Referee: Javier Santos (Puerto Rico)

July 21, 2015
17:35

Trinidad and Tobago	2–4	Mexico
John 7'; Henry 39'	Report	Espericueta 60'; Álvarez 68'; Bueno 90'; Zúñiga 90+3'

Hamilton Pan Am Soccer Stadium, Hamilton
Referee: Sherwim Moore (Guyana)

=== Women's tournament ===
Roster

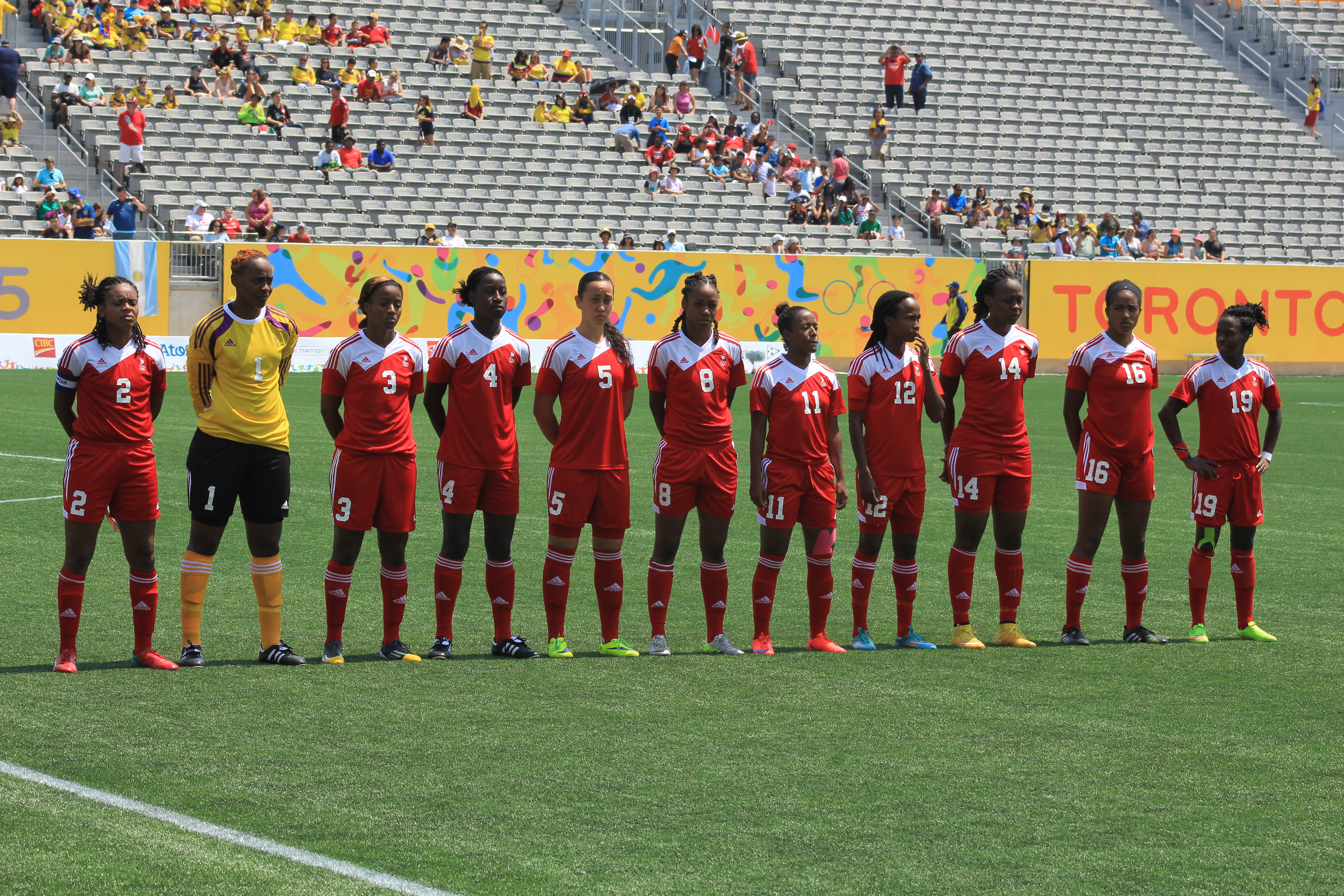
Team Trinidad and Tobago during the competition

Head coach: (Trinidad and Tobago) Ross Rusel

No.	Pos.	Player	Date of birth (age)	Club
1	GK	Kimika Forbes	26 August 1990 (aged 24)	(United States Soccer Federation) Boston Breakers
21	GK	Shalette Alexander	20 December 1993 (aged 21)	(Trinidad and Tobago Football Association) Wiley University
2	DF	Ayana Russell	16 March 1988 (aged 27)	(Trinidad and Tobago Football Association) Malic FC
3	FW	Mariah Shade	9 December 1991 (aged 23)	(Trinidad and Tobago Football Association) Petrotrin
4	DF	Rhea Belgrave	19 July 1991 (aged 23)	(United States Soccer Federation) West Texas A&M
5	DF	Arin King	2 August 1991 (aged 23)	(Canadian Soccer Association) GS United
8	DF	Patrice Superville	8 April 1987 (aged 28)	(Trinidad and Tobago Football Association) St. Ann Rangers
11	MF	Janine François	1 January 1989 (aged 26)	(Trinidad and Tobago Football Association) Real Dimension
12	FW	Ahkeela Mollon	2 April 1985 (aged 30)	(Trinidad and Tobago Football Association) Rush Soccer Club
14	MF	Karin Forbes	27 August 1991 (aged 23)	(United States Soccer Federation) Civic/Pioneers
16	DF	Brianna Ryce	25 January 1994 (aged 21)	(United States Soccer Federation) DePaul University
19	FW	Kennya Cordner	11 December 1988 (aged 26)	(United States Soccer Federation) Seattle Sounders Women
6	MF	Khadidra Debesette	1 June 1995 (aged 20)	(Trinidad and Tobago Football Association) La Brea Angels
9	FW	Maylee Atthin Johnson	5 September 1986 (aged 28)	(Trinidad and Tobago Football Association)
10	FW	Tasha St. Louis	20 December 1983 (aged 31)	(Swedish Football Association) Sunnanå SK
13	FW	Shenelle Henry	13 March 1994 (aged 21)	(Trinidad and Tobago Football Association) Real Dimension
15	DF	Lauryn Hutchinson	12 June 1991 (aged 24)	(Trinidad and Tobago Football Association) Richmond United
7	FW	Demelle Mascall	20 October 1988 (aged 26)	(Trinidad and Tobago Football Association) Petrotrin

Group A

Pos	Team	Pld	W	D	L	GF	GA	GD	Pts	Qualification
1	Colombia	3	2	1	0	4	1	+3	7	Medal round
2	Mexico	3	2	0	1	6	3	+3	6	Medal round
3	Trinidad and Tobago	3	0	2	1	4	6	−2	2	
4	Argentina	3	0	1	2	3	7	−4	1	

Source: Toronto 2015
July 11, 2015
14:05

Argentina	2–2	Trinidad and Tobago
Larroquette 52'; Potassa 88'	Report	Shade 59'; Attin-Johnson 90'

Hamilton Pan Am Soccer Stadium, Hamilton
Referee: Mirian Leon (El Salvador)

July 14, 2015
20:35

Colombia	1–1	Trinidad and Tobago
Vidal 4'	Report	Cordner 87'

Hamilton Pan Am Soccer Stadium, Hamilton
Referee: Marie-Soleil Beaudoin (Canada)

July 18, 2015
17:35

Trinidad and Tobago	1–3	Mexico
Shade 51' (pen.)	Report	Mayor 28', 45'; Ocampo 70'

Hamilton Pan Am Soccer Stadium, Hamilton
Referee: Mirian Leon (El Salvador)

== Golf ==
Trinidad and Tobago qualified a full team of four golfers.

Athlete(s)	Event	Final					
Athlete(s)	Event	Round 1	Round 2	Round 3	Round 4	Total	Rank
Sachin Kumar	Men's individual	78	76	73	75	302 (+14)	=25
Talin Rajendranath	Men's individual	74	78	75	74	301 (+13)	24
Christina Ferreira	Women's individual	84	85	79	83	330 (+42)	=26
Monifa Sealy	Women's individual	81	77	77	83	318 (+30)	=22
Sachin Kumar; Talin Rajendranath; Christina Ferreira; Monifa Sealy	Mixed team	155	153	150	156	614 (+38)	15

== Gymnastics ==
=== Artistic ===
Trinidad and Tobago qualified 2 gymnasts.

Men
Individual Qualification

Athlete	Event	Final							
Athlete	Event	Apparatus						Total	Rank
Athlete	Event	F	PH	R	V	PB	HB	Total	Rank
William Albert	All-around	DNS	DNS	13.050	DNS	DNS	DNS	13.050	56

Qualification Legend: Q = Qualified to apparatus final

Women

Athlete	Event	Qualification						Final					
Athlete	Event	Apparatus				Total	Rank	Apparatus				Total	Rank
Athlete	Event	F	V	UB	BB	Total	Rank	F	V	UB	BB	Total	Rank
Marisa Dick	All-around	12.000	13.500	12.450	12.550	50.500 Q	20	12.600	13.450	12.400	12.800	51.250	14

Qualification Legend: Q = Qualified to apparatus final

== Judo ==
Trinidad and Tobago qualified a one male judoka.

Men

Athlete	Event	Round of 16	Quarterfinals	Semifinals	Repechage	Final / BM	
Athlete	Event	Opposition Result	Opposition Result	Opposition Result	Opposition Result	Opposition Result	Rank
Christopher George	100 kg	Manuel Bueno (URU); L 000-001	Did not advance				

== Sailing ==
Trinidad and Tobago qualified 2 boats.

Athlete	Event	Race													Net Points	Final Rank
Athlete	Event	1	2	3	4	5	6	7	8	9	10	11	12	M*	Net Points	Final Rank
Andrew Lewis	Laser	(10)	4	6	6	8	7	7	7	9	7	10	3	16	90	7
Kelly-Ann Arrindell	Laser Radial	2	11	9	10	3	7	7	(12)	4	8	3	6	2	72	5

== Shooting ==
Trinidad and Tobago qualified three male shooter.

Men

Athlete	Event	Qualification		Final	
Athlete	Event	Points	Rank	Points	Rank
Roger Daniel	50 m pistol	563	15	Did not advance	
Roger Daniel	10 m air pistol	521	20	Did not advance	
Marlon Moses	50 m rifle prone	609.5	18	Did not advance	
Anthony Maraj	Trap	72	28	Did not advance	

== Swimming ==
Trinidad and Tobago qualified three male swimmers.

Key

- Note – Ranks given are for the entire round
- FA = Qualified for the A Final
- FB = Qualified for the B Final
- DNS = Did not start
- ? = A swim-off is required to determine who would advance as the eighth seed to the A Final since two athletes recorded same time in their heats.

Men

Athlete	Event	Heat		Swim-off		Final	
Athlete	Event	Time	Rank	Time	Rank	Time	Rank
George Bovell	50 m freestyle	22.34 QA	6	—N/a		22.17	3rd place, bronze medalist(s)
Dylan Carter	50 m freestyle	22.48 ?	=8	22.39 QB	2	22.39	9
Dylan Carter	100 m freestyle	49.29	6	—N/a		49.10	5
Dylan Carter	100 m butterfly	53.89	13 FB	—N/a		DNS	
Christian Marsden	10 km open water	—N/a		—N/a		2:07:53.5	13

== Taekwondo ==
Trinidad and Tobago qualified one male taekwondo practitioner.

Athlete	Event	Round of 16	Quarterfinals	Semifinals	Repechage	Bronze medal	Final	
Athlete	Event	Opposition Result	Opposition Result	Opposition Result	Opposition Result	Opposition Result	Opposition Result	Rank
Dorian Alexander	Men's -68kg	Trejos (COL); L 5–11	Did not advance					

== See also ==
- Trinidad and Tobago at the 2016 Summer Olympics
