= Cycling at the 2023 Pan American Games – Men's keirin =

Men's keirin at the 2023 Pan American Games
- Venue: Velodrome
- Dates: October 27
- Competitors: 12 from 11 nations

Medalists
Gold medal	Kevin Quintero	Colombia
Silver medal	Nicholas Paul	Trinidad and Tobago
Bronze medal	Juan Ruiz Terán	Mexico

The men's keirin competition of the cycling events at the 2023 Pan American Games was held on October 27 at the Velodrome in Santiago, Chile.

== Schedule ==
Date	Time	Round
October 27, 2023	10:13	First round
October 27, 2023	19:15	Finals

== Results ==
=== First round ===
First 3 riders in each heat qualify to Final 1-6 and the others to Final 7-12.

==== Heat 1 ====
Rank	Name	Nation	Notes
1	Kevin Quintero	Colombia	Q
2	James Hedgcock	Canada	Q
3	Juan Ruiz Terán	Mexico	Q
4	Lucas Vilar	Argentina	
5	Evan Boone	United States	
6	Luis Yañez	Venezuela	

==== Heat 2 ====
Rank	Name	Nation	Notes
1	João Vitor da Silva	Brazil	Q
2	Jaïr Tjon En Fa	Suriname	Q
3	Nicholas Paul	Trinidad and Tobago	Q
4	Vicente Ramírez	Chile	
5	Alexis Domínguez	Paraguay	
	Cristian Ortega	Colombia	DSQ

=== Finals ===
The final classification is determined in the medal finals.

==== Finals 7–12 ====
Rank	Name	Nation	Notes
7	Lucas Vilar	Argentina	
8	Evan Boone	United States	
9	Luis Yañez	Venezuela	
10	Alexis Domínguez	Paraguay	
11	Vicente Ramírez	Chile	

==== Finals 1–6 ====
Rank	Name	Nation	Notes
1st place, gold medalist(s)	Kevin Quintero	Colombia	
2nd place, silver medalist(s)	Nicholas Paul	Trinidad and Tobago	
3rd place, bronze medalist(s)	Juan Ruiz Terán	Mexico	
4	James Hedgcock	Canada	
5	Jaïr Tjon En Fa	Suriname	
6	João Vitor da Silva	Brazil	
