= Athletics at the 2011 Pan American Games – Women's shot put =

Women's shot put at the 2011 Pan American Games
- Venue: Telmex Athletics Stadium
- Dates: October 27
- Competitors: 10 from 8 nations
- Winning distance: 18.57

Medalists
Gold medal	Misleydis González	Cuba
Silver medal	Cleopatra Borel-Brown	Trinidad and Tobago
Bronze medal	Michelle Carter	United States

The women's shot put competition at the 2011 Pan American Games in Guadalajara was held on October 27 at the newly built Telmex Athletics Stadium. The previous champion was Misleydis González of Cuba.

== Records ==
Prior to this competition, the existing world and Pan American Games records were as follows:

World record	Natalya Lisovskaya (URS)	22.63	Moscow, Soviet Union	June 7, 1987
Pan American Games record	María Elena Sarría (CUB)	19.34	Caracas, Venezuela	August 28, 1983

== Qualification ==
Each National Olympic Committee (NOC) was able to enter up to two entrants providing they had met the minimum standard (14.50 meters) in the qualifying period (January 1, 2010 to September 14, 2011).

== Schedule ==
Date	Time	Round
October 27, 2011	15:50	Final

== Results ==
All distances shown are in meters:centimeters

KEY:	q	Fastest non-qualifiers	Q	Qualified	NR	National record	PB	Personal best	SB	Seasonal best

=== Final ===
Rank	Athlete	Nationality	#1	#2	#3	#4	#5	#6	Result	Notes
1st place, gold medalist(s)	Misleydis González	Cuba	18.09	18.25	18.51	18.52	18.55	18.57	18.57	
2nd place, silver medalist(s)	Cleopatra Borel-Brown	Trinidad and Tobago	18.32	18.46	18.07	18.42	18.22	x	18.46	PB
3rd place, bronze medalist(s)	Michelle Carter	United States	17.22	18.09	x	18.03	17.84	17.85	18.09	
4	Mailín Vargas	Cuba	17.98	x	17.82	17.78	x	x	17.98	
5	Natalia Ducó	Chile	x	16.77	17.56	x	17.51	17.17	17.56	
6	Zara Northover	Jamaica	16.09	15.46	16.19	15.30	16.64	16.23	16.64	PB
7	Alyssa Hasslen	United States	16.50	16.32	16.52	x	16.56	x	16.56	
8	Anyela Rivas	Colombia	15.77	16.18	16.00	x	x	16.43	16.43	
9	Vanessa Henry	Dominica	14.04	x	13.83				14.04	
	Keely Medeiros	Brazil	x	x	x				NM	
