= Trinidad and Tobago at the Pan American Games =

- IOC code: TTO
- NOC: Trinidad and Tobago Olympic Committee
- Medals Ranked 16th: Gold 12 Silver 23 Bronze 31 Total 66

Pan American Games appearances (overview)
- 1951; 1955; 1959; 1963; 1967; 1971; 1975; 1979; 1983; 1987; 1991; 1995; 1999; 2003; 2007; 2011; 2015; 2019; 2023

Trinidad and Tobago has competed from the first edition of the Pan American Games.

== Pan American Games ==
=== Medals by games ===
Year	Host city	Gold	Silver	Bronze	Total
1951	Buenos Aires	1	3	0	4
1955	Mexico City	0	1	1	2
1959	Chicago	0	0	0	0
1963	São Paulo	1	1	2	4
1967	Winnipeg	2	2	3	7
1971	Cali	1	1	5	7
1975	Mexico City	0	1	0	1
1979	San Juan	0	0	0	0
1983	Caracas	0	1	2	3
1987	Indianapolis	0	1	1	2
1991	Havana	1	1	0	2
1995	Mar del Plata	0	0	6	6
1999	Winnipeg	0	0	1	1
2003	Santo Domingo	2	4	1	7
2007	Rio de Janeiro	0	1	3	4
2011	Guadalajara	0	2	2	4
2015	Toronto	3	3	2	8
2019	Lima	2	8	2	12
2023	Santiago	1	1	2	4
2027	Lima	Future event			
Total		12	23	31	66

== Junior Pan American Games ==
=== Medals by games ===
Year	Host city	Gold	Silver	Bronze	Total
2021	Cali-Valle	0	1	1	2
2025	Asunción	1	0	8	9
Total		1	1	9	11

== See also ==
- Trinidad and Tobago at the Olympics
