= Trinidad and Tobago at the 1995 Pan American Games =

- IOC code: TRI
- NOC: Trinidad and Tobago Olympic Committee

in Mar del Plata 11–26 March 1995
- Medals Ranked 26th: Gold 0 Silver 0 Bronze 6 Total 6

Pan American Games appearances (overview)
- 1951; 1955; 1959; 1963; 1967; 1971; 1975; 1979; 1983; 1987; 1991; 1995; 1999; 2003; 2007; 2011; 2015; 2019; 2023; 2027

The 12th Pan American Games were held in Mar del Plata, Argentina from March 11 to March 26, 1995.

== Medals ==
=== Bronze ===
===== Athletics =====
- Men's 4x400 metres: Robert Guy, Neil de Silva, Hayden Stephen, and Ian Morris

===== Boxing =====
- Men's Light Middleweight (– 71 kg): Kurt Sinette

===== Cycling =====
- Men's 1.000m Time Trial (Track): Gene Samuel

===== Taekwondo =====
- Men's – 50 kg: Sherland Flores
- Women's – 51 kg: Cheryl Sankar

== See also ==
- Trinidad and Tobago at the 1996 Summer Olympics
