= Trinidad and Tobago at the 1999 Pan American Games =

- IOC code: TRI
- NOC: Trinidad and Tobago Olympic Committee

in Winnipeg 23 July – 8 August 1999
- Medals Ranked 25th: Gold 0 Silver 0 Bronze 1 Total 1

Pan American Games appearances (overview)
- 1951; 1955; 1959; 1963; 1967; 1971; 1975; 1979; 1983; 1987; 1991; 1995; 1999; 2003; 2007; 2011; 2015; 2019; 2023

The 13th Pan American Games were held in Winnipeg, Manitoba, Canada from July 23 to August 8, 1999.

== Medals ==
=== Bronze ===
===== Cycling =====
- Men's Olympic Sprint (Track): Mario Joseph

== Results by event ==
Athlete	Event	Result	
Athlete	Event	Time	Rank
Siobhan Cropper	Women's 100m free	57.89	6
Siobhan Cropper	Women's 100m butterfly	1:02.76	5

== See also ==
- Trinidad and Tobago at the 2000 Summer Olympics
