= Karissa Cook =

American volleyball player

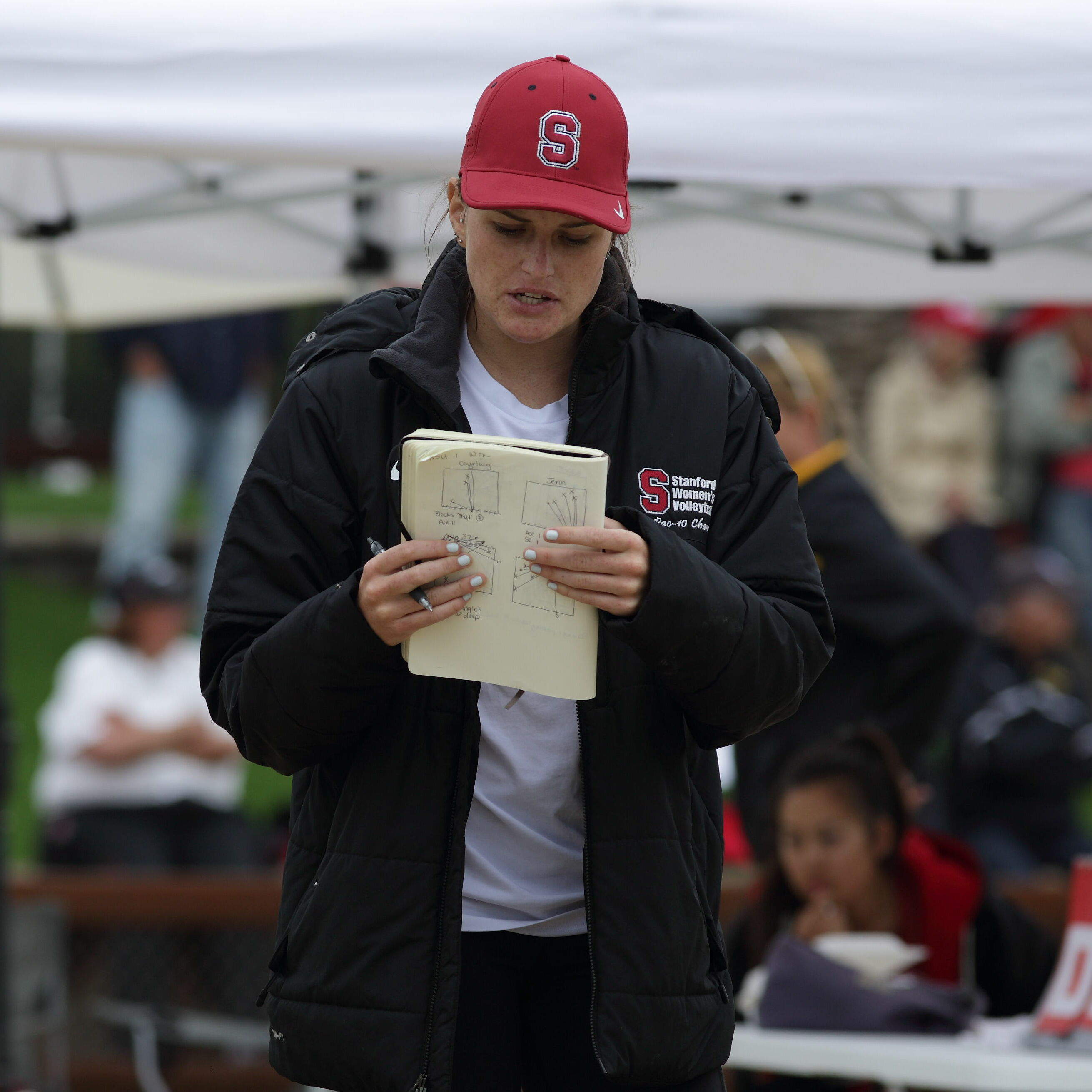
- Cook in 2016

Personal information
- Full name: Karissa Kellie Cook
- Born: April 8, 1991 (age 35) Salt Lake City, Utah, U.S.
- Home town: Santa Cruz, California, U.S.
- Education: Stanford / Hawaiʻi
- Height: 5 ft 11 in (1.80 m)

Volleyball information
- Position: Setter

Career
- Years: Team
- 2009–2012: Stanford Cardinal
- 2014: Hawaiʻi Rainbow Wahine

National team
- Years: Team
- 2009: (United States) USA U-20 indoor national team
- 2015–present: (United States) USA beach volleyball team
Medal record
Women's beach Volleyball
Representing the United States
Pan American Games
Gold medal – first place	2019 Lima	Beach
World Beach Games
Gold medal – first place	2019 Doha	Beach
NORCECA Beach Tour
Gold medal – first place	2018 Pointe Du-Martin	Beach

Karissa Kellie Cook (born April 8, 1991) is an American professional beach volleyball player and former indoor volleyball player.

== Early life ==
Cook was born on April 8, 1991, in Salt Lake City, Utah. She came from an athletic family: her father, David, played basketball at the University of San Diego and professionally for the Newcastle Falcons in Australia, and her mother, Suzy, played volleyball for United States International University. Her brother, Brian Cook, also played professional beach volleyball. Cook played volleyball and was also a track athlete for Harbor High School. She was the number 25 recruit nationally in her graduating class. She participated with team USA's junior national team at the 2009 World Championships.

== Career ==
=== Indoor ===
Cook played indoor volleyball as a setter for Stanford from 2009 to 2012. She was named to the Pac-10 All-Freshman Team in 2009 and an All-Pac-12 honorable mention selection as a junior in 2011. She finished her career with 142 kills, 3,027 assists and 53 service aces.

=== Beach ===
Cook played beach volleyball for Hawaiʻi's beach volleyball team in 2014. She graduated from Hawaiʻi with a master's degree in civil engineering. During the season, she was named an All-American. She posted a team-best 42–7 record and finished as the runner-up at the AVCA Pairs National Championship.

Cook made her AVP debut in Manhattan Beach with Michelle Iafigliola in 2015, they placed 25th at the tournament. In 2018, partnered with Katie Spieler, she started off the AVP season with a third-place finish. In October 2018, with Spieler, they won the gold medal at the NORCECA beach tour championships in Pointe Du-Martin in Martinique, defeating Canadians Sophie Bukovec and Alexandra Poletto 21–18, 20–22, 15–12.

In 2019, Cook partnered with Jace Pardon, she won her first AVP title Austin, Texas. Cook and Pardon teamed together again to represent the U.S. in the 2019 Pan American Games in Peru, winning the gold medal against two-time Olympian Ana Gallay and Fernanda Pereyra of Argentina. It was the first time that the United States won a gold medal at the Pan American Games in beach volleyball.

In October 2019, Cook won a gold medal with her teammates at the 2019 World Beach Games that were held in Doha, Qatar in the 4x4 beach volleyball event. She had five kills and five blocks in the championship match versus Brazil.

=== Snow ===
In the years 2018 and 2019, she was part of the United States women's national snow volleyball team.

=== Coaching career ===
She returned to Stanford in 2015 and served as an assistant coach for the beach volleyball team until 2018. In 2021, she was hired by Loyola Marymount as an assistant coach for their beach volleyball program.
