= Trinidad and Tobago at the 2023 Pan American Games =

- IOC code: TTO
- NOC: Trinidad and Tobago Olympic Committee

in Santiago, Chile 20 October 2023 – 5 November 2023
- Competitors: 63 in 7 sports
- Flag bearers (opening): Nicholas Paul & Tiana Guy
- Flag bearer (closing): Christopher Richards
- Medals Ranked =19th: Gold 1 Silver 1 Bronze 2 Total 4

Pan American Games appearances (overview)
- 1951; 1955; 1959; 1963; 1967; 1971; 1975; 1979; 1983; 1987; 1991; 1995; 1999; 2003; 2007; 2011; 2015; 2019; 2023

Trinidad and Tobago is scheduled to compete at the 2023 Pan American Games in Santiago, Chile from October 20 to November 5, 2023. This will be Trinidad and Tobago's 18th appearance at the Pan American Games, having missed only the 1959 edition.

Track cyclist Nicholas Paul and boxer Tiana Guy were the country's flagbearers during the opening ceremony. Meanwhile, golfer Christopher Richards was the country's flagbearer during the closing ceremony.

== Competitors ==
The following is the list of number of competitors (per gender) participating at the games per sport/discipline.

Sport	Men	Women	Total
Badminton	1	1	2
Basketball	4	0	4
Boxing	3	2	5
Canoeing	1	0	1
Cycling	4	2	6
Field hockey	16	16	32
Gymnastics	1	1	2
Table tennis	0	1	11
Total	30	23	53

== Medallists ==
The following Trinidadian competitors won medals at the games. In the discipline sections below, the medalists' names are bolded.

Medal	Name	Sport	Event	Date
Gold	Nicholas Paul	Cycling	Men's sprint	October 26
Silver	Nicholas Paul	Cycling	Men's keirin	October 27
Bronze	Trinidad and Tobago men's national 3x3 team: Ahkeel Boyd; Ahkeem Boyd; Chike Augustine; Moriba de Frietas	Basketball	Men's 3x3 tournament	October 23
Bronze	Michelle-Lee Ahye	Athletics	Women's 100 metres	October 31

== Badminton ==
Trinidad and Tobago qualified a team of two athletes (one man and one woman).

Athlete	Event	First round	Second round	Quarterfinals	Semifinals	Final / BM	
Athlete	Event	Opposition Result	Opposition Result	Opposition Result	Opposition Result	Opposition Result	Rank
Reece Marcano	Men's singles	Aguirre (PER)					
Chequeda De Boulet	Women's singles	Bye	Acosta (DOM)				
Reece Marcano; Chequeda De Boulet	Mixed doubles	—N/a					

== Basketball ==
3x3

=== Men's tournament ===
Trinidad and Tobago qualified a men's team (of 4 athletes) by finishing fourth in the 2022 FIBA 3x3 AmeriCup.

Summary

Team	Event	Preliminary round						Semifinal	Final / BM / Pl.	
Team	Event	Opposition Result	Opposition Result	Opposition Result	Opposition Result	Opposition Result	Rank	Opposition Result	Opposition Result	Rank
Trinidad and Tobago men	Men's tournament									

== Boxing ==
Trinidad and Tobago qualified 5 boxers (three men and two women).

Athlete	Event	Round of 32	Round of 16	Quarterfinals	Semifinals	Final	Rank
Athlete	Event	Opposition Result	Opposition Result	Opposition Result	Opposition Result	Opposition Result	Rank
Al Jaleel Jokhu	Men's –51 kg						
Aaron Prince	Men's –71 kg						
Nigel Paul	Men's +92 kg	—N/a	Salcedo (COL); **L** 0–5	Did not advance			
Tianna Guy	Women's –60 kg						
Eyed George	Women's –75 kg	—N/a	Bylon (PAN); **L** RSC	Did not advance			

== Canoeing ==
=== Sprint ===
Trinidad and Tobago qualified a male sprint canoeist.

Men

Athlete	Event	Heat		Semifinal		Final	
Athlete	Event	Time	Rank	Time	Rank	Time	Rank
Nicholas Robinson	K-1 1000 m						

== Cycling ==
Trinidad and Tobago qualified a total of 6 cyclists (four men and two women).

=== Road ===
Trinidad and Tobago qualified a female cyclist at the Pan American Championships.

Athlete	Event	Time	Rank
Teniel Campbell	Women's road race		
Teniel Campbell	Women's road time trial		

=== Track ===
Trinidad and Tobago qualified a team of 5 track cyclists (four men and one woman).

Sprint

Athlete	Event	Qualification		Round of 16	Repechage 1	Quarterfinals	Semifinals	Final	
Athlete	Event	Time	Rank	Opposition Time	Opposition Time	Opposition Result	Opposition Result	Opposition Result	Rank
	Men's individual								
	Men's team			—N/a					

Keirin

Athlete	Event	Heats	Repechage	Final
Athlete	Event	Rank	Rank	Rank
	Men's			

Omnium

Athlete	Event	Scratch race		Tempo race		Elimination race		Points race		Total	
Athlete	Event	Points	Rank	Points	Rank	Points	Rank	Points	Rank	Points	Rank
	Men's										
	Women's										

== Field hockey ==
Summary

Team	Event	Preliminary round				Quarterfinal	Semifinal	Final / BM / Pl.	
Team	Event	Opposition Result	Opposition Result	Opposition Result	Rank	Opposition Result	Opposition Result	Opposition Result	Rank
Trinidad and Tobago men	Men's tournament	United States	Brazil	Canada					
Trinidad and Tobago women	Women's tournament	United States	Uruguay	Argentina					

=== Men's tournament ===
Trinidad and Tobago qualified a men's team of 16 athletes by finishing second at the 2023 Central American and Caribbean Games.

Group B

Pos	Team	Pld	W	D	L	GF	GA	GD	Pts	Qualification
1	Canada	3	3	0	0	8	1	+7	**9**	Semi-finals
2	United States	3	2	0	1	12	4	+8	**6**	Semi-finals
3	Brazil	3	1	0	2	3	8	−5	**3**	5th–8th classification
4	Trinidad and Tobago	3	0	0	3	2	12	−10	**0**	5th–8th classification

Source: FIH
Rules for classification: 1) points; 2) matches won; 3) goal difference; 4) goals for; 5) head-to-head result; 6) field goals for.

25 October 2023
11:30

United States	6–1	Trinidad and Tobago
A. Käppeler 2'; Harris 13'; Heldens 28'; Kokolakis 43'; Leser 50'; Quaile 51'	Report	Te. Marcano 55'

Umpires:
Gabriel Labate (ARG)
Guillermo Poblete Luna (CHI)

27 October 2023
09:30

Brazil	2–1	Trinidad and Tobago
Patrocínio 2'; Vehrle-Smith 6'	Report	Pierre 33'

Umpires:
Reinier Díaz (CUB)
Hugo Romero (PAR)

29 October 2023
09:30

Canada	4–0	Trinidad and Tobago
Sarmiento 7'; Davis 30'; Johnston 31'; Kirkpatrick 44'	Report

Umpires:
Guillermo Poblete Luna (CHI)
Fabián Romero (PAR)

=== Women's tournament ===
Trinidad and Tobago qualified a women's team of 16 athletes by finishing sixth at the 2022 Pan American Cup.

Group A

Pos	Team	Pld	W	D	L	GF	GA	GD	Pts	Qualification
1	Argentina	3	3	0	0	34	1	+33	**9**	Semi-finals
2	United States	3	2	0	1	19	5	+14	**6**	Semi-finals
3	Uruguay	3	1	0	2	11	11	0	**3**	5th–8th classification
4	Trinidad and Tobago	3	0	0	3	0	47	−47	**0**	5th–8th classification

Source: FIH
Rules for classification: 1) points; 2) matches won; 3) goal difference; 4) goals for; 5) head-to-head result; 6) field goals for.

26 October 2023
11:30

United States	15–0	Trinidad and Tobago
Gonzales 2', 25'; Grega 11'; Hoffman 22', 28'; Zimmer 27'; Caarls 28', 29', 59'; Tamer 41', 47', 58'; Yeager 45'; Sessa 55'; Crouse 57'	Report

Umpires:
Natalia Lodeiro (URU)
Victoria Pazos (ARG)

28 October 2023
09:30

Uruguay	11–0	Trinidad and Tobago
Amadeo 13', 27', 29'; Viana 21', 21', 48', 53'; Algorta 26'; Vilar 31', 35', 58'	Report

Umpires:
Melina Illanes (ARG)
Claudia Montino (CHI)

30 October 2023
09:30

Argentina	21–0	Trinidad and Tobago
Campoy 9'; Cairó 12', 50'; Trinchinetti 17', 32'; Gorzelany 22', 23', 24', 36', 43', 58'; Raposo 27', 49'; Sauze 28'; Granatto 33', 40', 42'; Thome 40', 54'; Jankunas 43', 55'	Report

Umpires:
Victoria Pazos (ARG)
Emi Yamada (JPN)

== Golf ==
Trinidad and Tobago qualified a male golfer.

Athlete	Event	Round 1	Round 2	Round 3	Round 4	Total		
Athlete	Event	Score	Score	Score	Score	Score	Par	Rank
Christopher Richards	Men's individual	83	76	69	75	303	+15	29

== Gymnastics ==
=== Artistic ===
Trinidad and Tobago qualified two gymnasts in artistic (one man and one woman) at the 2023 Pan American Championships.

Men

Athlete	Event	Qualification						Total	Rank
Athlete	Event	F	PH	R	V	PB	HB	Total	Rank
	Individual all-around								

Qualification Legend: Q = Qualified to apparatus final

Women

Athlete	Event	Qualification				Total	Rank
Athlete	Event	V	UB	BB	F	Total	Rank
	Individual all-around						

Qualification Legend: Q = Qualified to apparatus final

== Table tennis ==
Trinidad and Tobago qualified one female table tennis athlete at the final qualification tournament in Lima, Peru.

Women

Athlete	Event	Group stage				First round	Second round	Quarterfinal	Semifinal	Final / BM	
Athlete	Event	Opposition Result	Opposition Result	Opposition Result	Rank	Opposition Result	Opposition Result	Opposition Result	Opposition Result	Opposition Result	Rank
Rheann Chung	Singles	—N/a									
