= Trinidad and Tobago at the 2007 Pan American Games =

- IOC code: TRI
- NOC: Trinidad and Tobago Olympic Committee

in Rio de Janeiro 13–29 July 2007
- Competitors: 75 in 11 sports
- Flag bearer: Kwadwane Brown
- Medals Ranked 21st: Gold 0 Silver 1 Bronze 3 Total 4

Pan American Games appearances (overview)
- 1951; 1955; 1959; 1963; 1967; 1971; 1975; 1979; 1983; 1987; 1991; 1995; 1999; 2003; 2007; 2011; 2015; 2019; 2023

The 15th Pan American Games were held in Rio de Janeiro, Brazil from 13 July 2007 to 29 July 2007.

== Medals ==
=== Silver ===
===== Cycling =====
- Men's Individual Road Race: Emile Abraham

=== Bronze ===
===== Athletics =====
- Women's Shot Put: Cleopatra Borel-Brown

===== Swimming =====
- Men's 50m Freestyle: George Bovell

===== Taekwondo =====
- Men's – 80 kg: Chinedum Osuji
