= Rheeza Grant =

Trinidad and Tobago volleyball player (born 1986)

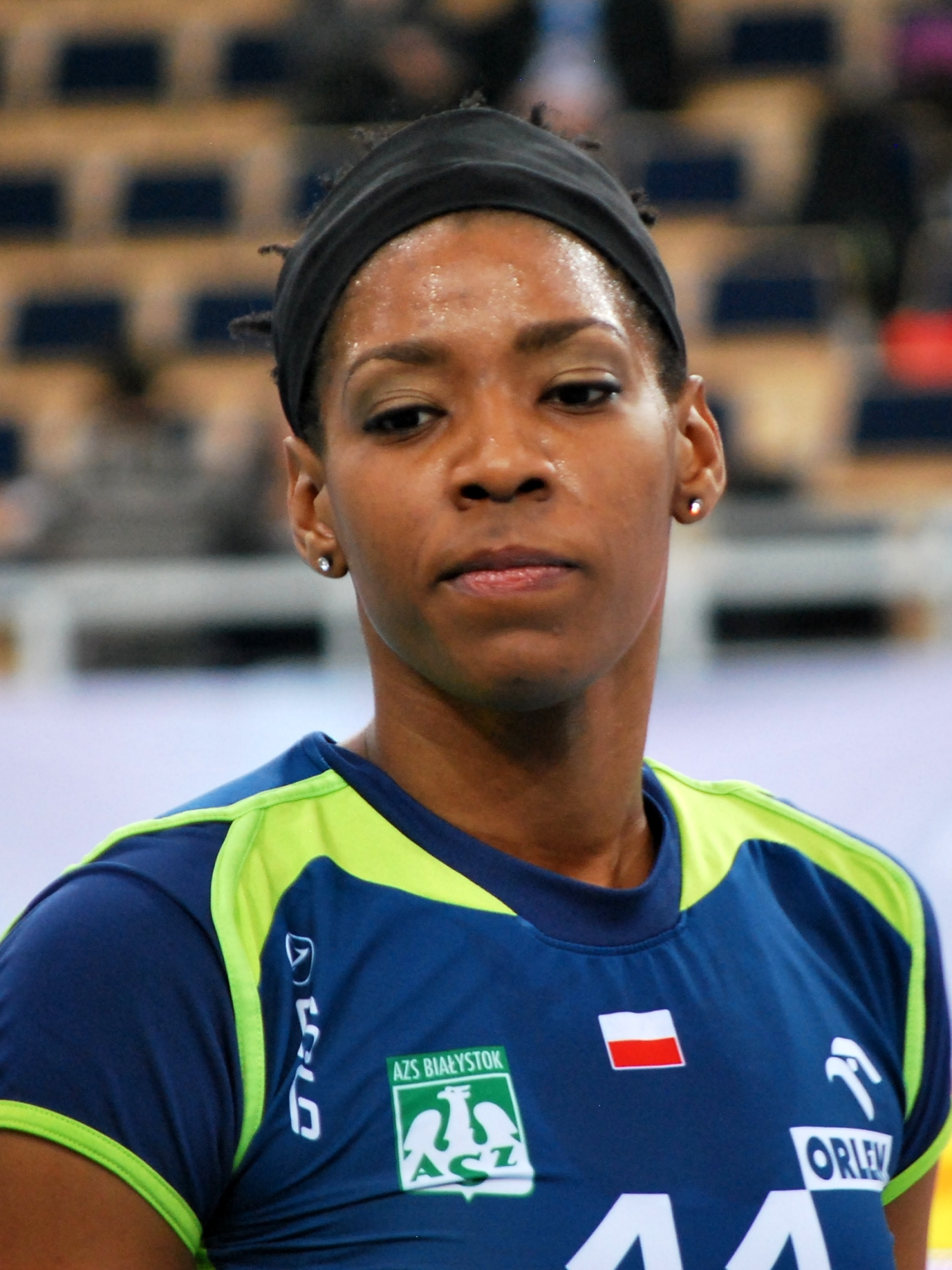
- Rheeza Grant 2012

Personal information
- Nationality: Trinidad and Tobago
- Born: 10 August 1986 (age 40); Port Of Spain
- Height: 185 cm (73 in)
- Weight: 70 kg (154 lb)
- Spike: 296 cm (117 in)
- Block: 281 cm (111 in)
- Education: University of Trinidad and Tobago

Volleyball information
- Position: Universal
- Current club: La Cura
- Number: 9 (national indoor volleyball team)

National team
2006, 2007, 2008, 2009, 2010, 2011, 2012, 2013, 2014	Trinidad and Tobago

Rheeza Grant (born 10 August 1986) is a Trinidad and Tobago volleyball player. She was part of the Trinidad and Tobago women's national volleyball team.

She participated at the 2011 Women's Pan-American Volleyball Cup.
