= Marcela Araya =

Chilean constituent

Member of the Constitutional Council
- In office 7 June 2023 – 7 November 2023
- Constituency: Atacama Region

Regional Ministerial Secretary of Women and Gender Equality for the Atacama Region
- In office 11 March 2022 – 25 January 2023
- President: Gabriel Boric
- Succeeded by: Fabiola Gallardo

Personal details
- Born: 18 September 1976 (age 49) Vallenar, Chile
- Party: Socialist Party
- Parent(s): Enrique Araya; Nolvia Sepúlveda

Marcela Araya Sepúlveda (born 18 September 1976) is a Chilean engineer, environmental activist, and politician. She served as a member of the Constitutional Council representing the 4th constituency of the Atacama Region.

She has been actively involved in feminist and environmental organizations, including Atacama Limpio, Huellas del Valle, and Río de Oro.

Araya also worked for the municipal government of her hometown, where she served as head of the Municipal Planning Department and as local coordinator of the Quiero mi Barrio programme.

== Political career ==
In the 2021 elections for the Constitutional Convention, she ran as a candidate for the 4th district of the Atacama Region. She was not elected, obtaining 2,815 votes, which represented 3.42% of the valid votes cast.

She was subsequently appointed Regional Ministerial Secretary of Women and Gender Equality for the Atacama Region during the administration of President Gabriel Boric. She held the position until January 2023, when she was succeeded by Fabiola Gallardo.

In the elections held on 7 May 2023, Araya ran for the Constitutional Council representing the 4th constituency of the Atacama Region as a member of the Socialist Party, within the Unity for Chile electoral pact. According to official results from the Electoral Court (TRICEL), she was elected after receiving 9,599 votes, securing a seat through the application of the gender correction mechanism designed to ensure balanced representation of women and men within the council.
