= Fernanda Pereyra =

Argentine beach volleyball player

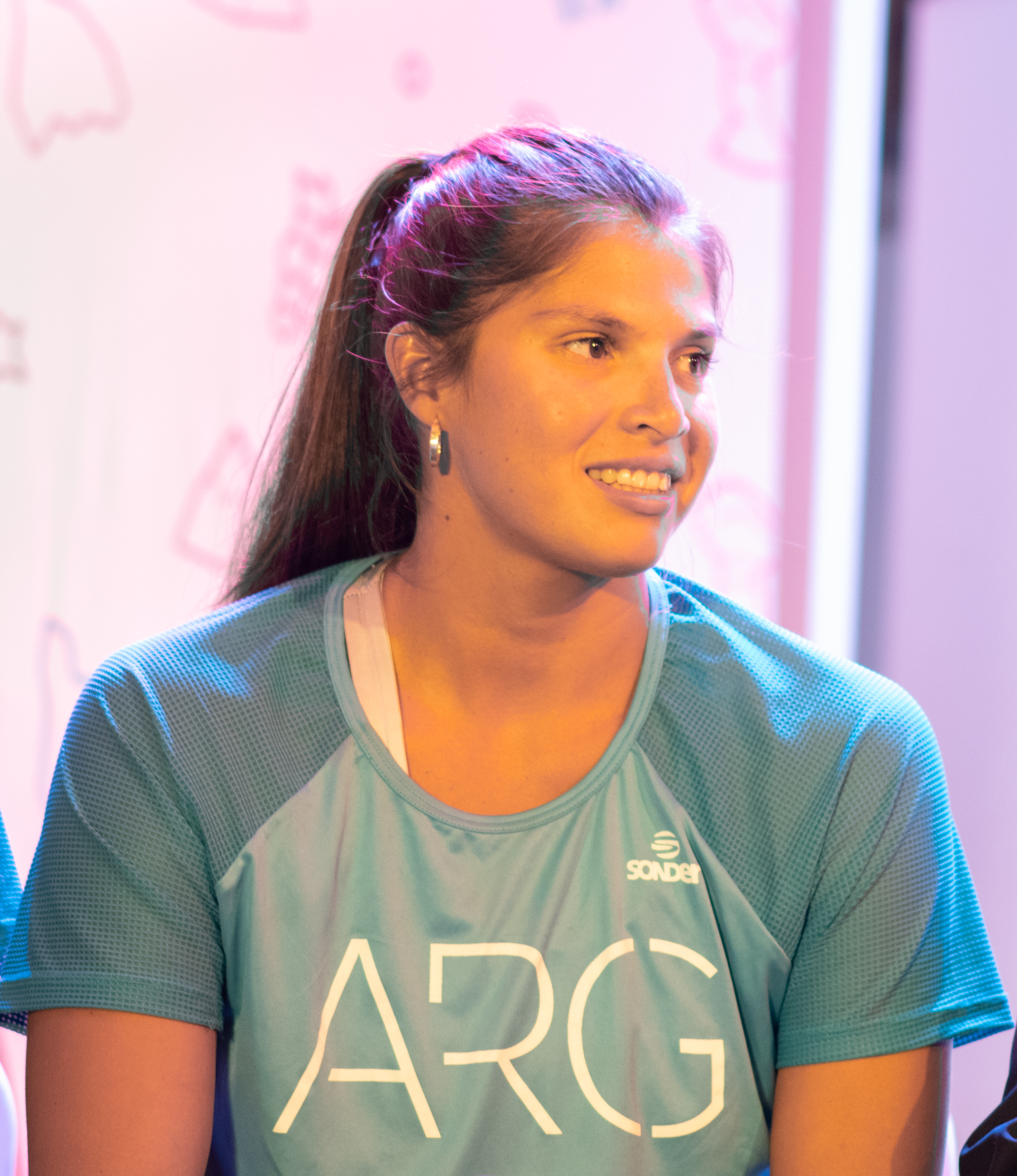
- Pereyra in 2019

Personal information
- Nationality: Argentina
- Born: 30 June 1991 (age 34) San Juan, Argentina
- Height: 1.80 m (5 ft 11 in)

Sport
- Sport: Beach volleyball
Medal record
Representing Argentina
Pan American Games
Silver medal – second place	2019 Lima	Beach

Fernanda Pereyra (born 30 June 1991) is an Argentine beach volleyball player. She competed in the 2020 Summer Olympics.

== Career ==
She competed at the 2019 Pan American Games, winning a silver medal. She competed at the 2021 FIVB Beach Volleyball World Tour.

== Family ==
Her brother is Federico Pereyra.
