= Andrew Lewis (sailor) =

Trinidad and Tobago sailor (born 1989)

Andrew Lewis OLY
Personal information
- Nationality: Trinidadian
- Born: 30 November 1989 (age 36) Port of Spain, Trinidad and Tobago

Sailing career
- Sport: Sailing
- Class: Laser

Andrew Lewis (born 30 November 1989 in Port of Spain) is a Trinidadian sailor. He competed at the 2012 Summer Olympics in the Men's Laser class. He also competed in the same class at the 2011 Pan American Games, and the 2015 Pan American Games, the 2016 Summer Olympics, and the 2020 Summer Olympics.
