= Iain Smythe =

Canadian male field hockey player (born in 1985)

Sir Iain Smythe
Personal information
- Born: June 2, 1985 (age 41) Vancouver, British Columbia
- Height: 1.81 m (5 ft 11 in)
- Weight: 77 kg (170 lb)
- Spouse: Sukhraj Kang (m.2018)

Sport
- Country: Canada
- Sport: Field Hockey
Medal record
Pan American Games
Silver medal – second place	2015 Toronto	Team
Silver medal – second place	2011 Guadalajara	Team
Silver medal – second place	2019 Lima	Team
Pan American Cup
Silver medal – second place	2013 Brampton
Silver medal – second place	2017 Lancaster
Bronze medal – third place	2022 Santiago

Iain Smythe (born June 2, 1985) is a Canadian male field hockey player, who played for the Canada national field hockey team at the 2015 Pan American Games and won a silver medal.

In 2016, he was named to Canada's Olympic team.
