= Marcelo Garraffo =

Argentine field hockey player

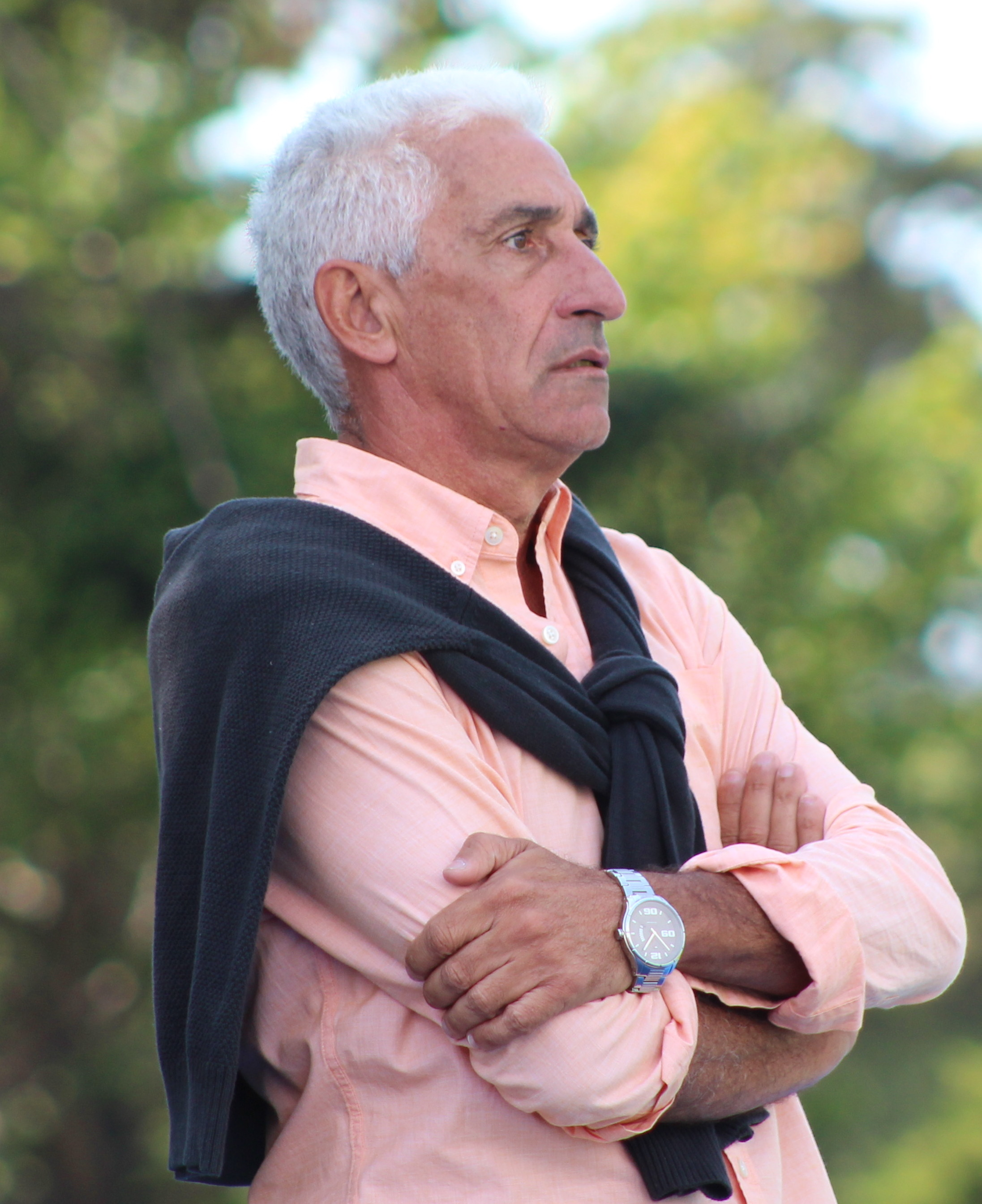
- Garraffo in 2016

Personal information
- Full name: Marcelo Omar Garraffo Biano
- Born: September 5, 1957 (age 68) Buenos Aires, Argentina
Medal record
Men's field hockey
Representing Argentina
Pan American Games
Gold medal – first place	1975 Mexico City	Team
Gold medal – first place	1991 Havana	Team
Silver medal – second place	1983 Caracas	Team
Silver medal – second place	1987 Indianapolis	Team

Marcelo Omar Garraffo Biano (born September 5, 1957) is a retired field hockey player from Argentina who competed in three Summer Olympics for his native country. He became a field hockey coach subsequent to his retirement as a player.

At his Olympic debut at the 1976 Summer Olympics he ended up in 11th place with the national squad, followed by the 8th place at the 1988 Summer Olympics. Four years later, at the 1992 Summer Olympics in Barcelona, Spain, Garraffo was the oldest member (34 years, 323 days) of the Argentinian field hockey delegation, and had the honour of carrying the flag at the opening ceremony. As a coach, he guided the men's national team to the silver medal at the 1999 Pan American Games.

At the end of 2012, he was chosen as the new coach of Argentina women's national field hockey team after Carlos Retegui's contract was not renewed. Four months later, by decision of the newly elected president of the Argentine Hockey Confederation, Federal Senator Aníbal Fernández, he was dismissed and replaced by Emanuel Roggero.
