= Lee Wright (field hockey) =

Canadian field hockey player (1944–2025)

Personal information
- Born: Lee Madison Wright; 28 August 1944 Vancouver, British Columbia, Canada
- Died: 4 December 2025 (aged 81) Victoria, British Columbia, Canada

Sport
- Sport: Field hockey
National team
Years	Team	Caps	Goals
1964–1976	Canada		-
Medal record
Men's field hockey
Representing Canada
Pan American Games
Bronze medal – third place	1971 Pan American Games	Team competition
Silver medal – second place	1975 Pan American Games	Team competition

Lee Madison Wright (28 August 1944 – 4 December 2025) was a Canadian field hockey player who competed in the 1964 Summer Olympics and in the 1976 Summer Olympics.

== Biography ==
Born in Vancouver, British Columbia, Wright also represented Canada at the Pan American Games, winning bronze in 1971 and silver in 1975.

Wright died from complications of Alzheimer's disease in Victoria, British Columbia, on 4 December 2025, at the age of 81.
