= 2009 Men's Pan American Cup =

International field hockey competition

Tournament details
- Host country: Chile
- City: Santiago
- Dates: 7–15 March
- Teams: 8 (from 1 confederation)
- Venue: Prince of Wales Country Club

Final positions
- Champions: Canada (1st title)
- Runner-up: United States
- Third place: Argentina

Tournament statistics
- Matches played: 20
- Goals scored: 161 (8.05 per match)
- Top scorer: (Trinidad and Tobago) Kwandwane Browne (11 goals)
- Best player: (Canada) Rob Short
- Best goalkeeper: (Canada) David Carter
- Fair play award: Mexico

The 2009 Men's Pan American Cup was the third edition of the Men's Pan American Cup, the quadrennial men's international field hockey championship of the Americas organized by the Pan American Hockey Federation. It was held between 7 and 15 March 2009 at the Prince of Wales Country Club in Santiago, Chile.

The tournament doubled as the qualifier to the 2010 World Cup to be held in New Delhi, India. The winner would qualify directly while teams ranked between 2nd and 4th would have the chance to obtain one of three berths at the World Cup Qualifiers.

Canada won the tournament for the first time after defeating the United States 2–1 in the final, earning an automatic berth at the 2010 World Cup.

== Umpires ==
Below are the 11 umpires appointed by the Pan American Hockey Federation:

- Saleem Aaron (USA)
- Diego Barbas (ARG)
- Brian Burrows (BAR)
- Fernando Gomez (ARG)
- John Hrytsak (CAN)
- Eduardo Lizana (ESP)
- Daniel Lopez Ramos (URU)
- Albert Marcano (TRI)
- Gus Soteriades (USA)
- Nathan Stagno (GIB)
- Aruturo Vasquez Serrano (MEX)

== Preliminary round ==
All times are Chile Daylight Time (UTC−03:00)

=== Pool A ===
| Pos | Team | Pld | W | D | L | GF | GA | GD | Pts | Qualification |
|---|---|---|---|---|---|---|---|---|---|---|
| 1 | Argentina | 3 | 3 | 0 | 0 | 33 | 0 | +33 | 9 | Semi-finals |
| 2 | United States | 3 | 2 | 0 | 1 | 13 | 11 | +2 | 6 | Semi-finals |
| 3 | Trinidad and Tobago | 3 | 1 | 0 | 2 | 13 | 11 | +2 | 3 | |
| 4 | Uruguay | 3 | 0 | 0 | 3 | 0 | 37 | −37 | 0 | |

Source: PAHF

7 March 2009
10:00

| Argentina | 18–0 | Uruguay |
|---|---|---|
| L. Vila 3', 12', 36', 45', 49'; Lopez 7'; M. Vila 10'; Callioni 15'; L. Argento 23'; T. Argento 24'; Almada 25', 35', 60', 69'; Cammareri 28'; R. Vila 29'; M. Rey 44'; Barra 66' | Report |

Umpires:
Nathan Stagno (GIB)
Arturo Vasquez

7 March 2009
12:00

| Trinidad and Tobago | 3–4 | United States |
|---|---|---|
| Quan Chan 41'; Browne 47', 51' | Report | Ginolfi 45', 64', 69'; S. Harris 61' |

Umpires:
Eduardo Lizana (ESP)
John Hrytsak (CAN)

8 March 2009
12:00

| Uruguay | 0–9 | United States |
|---|---|---|
| | Report | P. Harris 4', 18', 38', 47'; Martin 22'; Coolidge 58'; Holt 64', 66'; Cunningham 67' |

Umpires:
Diego Barbas (ARG)
Arturo Vazquez Serrano (MEX)

8 March 2009
14:00

| Trinidad and Tobago | 0–7 | Argentina |
|---|---|---|
| | Report | L. Vila 20', 25', 48'; R. Vila 37'; Almada 43', 44'; Cammareri 68' |

Umpires:
Eduardo Lizana (ESP)
John Hrytsak (CAN)

10 March 2009
12:00

| Argentina | 8–0 | United States |
|---|---|---|
| Barra 9', 29', 66'; Gilardi 16', 32'; M. Vila 40', 59'; Callioni 52' | Report |

Umpires:
Daniel Lopez Ramos (URU)
Albert Marcano (TRI)

10 March 2009
14:00

| Uruguay | 0–10 | Trinidad and Tobago |
|---|---|---|
| | Report | Farrell 11', 65'; Whittington 33'; Pierre 34', 39', 50'; Browne 42', 66'; Legerton 49', 50' |

Umpires:
Fernando Gomez (ARG)
Gus Soteriades (USA)

=== Pool B ===
| Pos | Team | Pld | W | D | L | GF | GA | GD | Pts | Qualification |
|---|---|---|---|---|---|---|---|---|---|---|
| 1 | Chile (H) | 3 | 2 | 1 | 0 | 19 | 5 | +14 | 7 | Semi-finals |
| 2 | Canada | 3 | 2 | 1 | 0 | 20 | 7 | +13 | 7 | Semi-finals |
| 3 | Mexico | 3 | 1 | 0 | 2 | 14 | 15 | −1 | 3 | |
| 4 | Brazil | 3 | 0 | 0 | 3 | 2 | 28 | −26 | 0 | |

Source: PAHF
(H) Hosts

7 March 2009
14:00

| Canada | 10–1 | Brazil |
|---|---|---|
| Singh 9', 15', 22'; Tupper 19', 29', 53'; Fernandes 31', 54'; Hildreth 46'; Pearson 48' | Report | Figuti 34' |

Umpires:
Gus Soteriades (USA)
Donny Gobinsingh (TRI)

7 March 2009
17:00

| Chile | 7–2 | Mexico |
|---|---|---|
| C. Rodríguez 10'; Krainz 12'; Kannegiesser 13'; Eggers 15'; M. Rodríguez 20', 53'; A. Thiermann 53' | Report | C. Garcia 33'; Peraza 62' |

Umpires:
Salemm Aaron (USA)
Fernando Gomez (ARG)

8 March 2009
16:00

| Brazil | 1–9 | Mexico |
|---|---|---|
| Felipe 39' | Report | F. Aguilar 16', 21', 38', 54'; Borquez 47', 61'; Peraza 53'; Estrada 61'; Moreno 62' |

Umpires:
Brian Burrows (BAR)
Albert Marcano (TRI)

8 March 2009
18:00

| Chile | 3–3 | Canada |
|---|---|---|
| Krainz 2'; Kannegiesser 4'; Richter 35' | Report | Grimes 9'; Fernandes 16'; R. Short 70' |

Umpires:
Nathan Stagno (GIB)
Daniel Lopez Ramos (URU)

11 March 2009
14:00

| Canada | 7–3 | Mexico |
|---|---|---|
| Tupper 14', 54', 67'; R. Short 19', 53'; Fernandes 24', 61' | Report | F. Aguilar 11'; Martinez 36'; Moreno 67' |

Umpires:
Saleem Aaron (USA)
Brian Burrows (BAR)

11 March 2009
18:00

| Brazil | 0–9 | Chile |
|---|---|---|
| | Report | C. Rodríguez 5'; Kapsch 10'; Eggers 12'; Richter 21', 35', 50'; Berzcelly 30'; Krussig 55'; A. Thiermann 65' |

Umpires:
Donny Gobinsingh (TRI)
Diego Barbas (ARG)

== Fifth to eighth place classification ==
=== Bracket ===
5–8th place semi-finals
12 March
Trinidad and Tobago | 9
Brazil | 0
12 March
Mexico | 9
Uruguay | 0

Fifth place
15 March
Trinidad and Tobago | 5
Mexico | 3
Seventh place
15 March
Brazil | 3
Uruguay | 1

=== 5–8th place semi-finals ===
12 March 2009
15:00

| Trinidad and Tobago | 9–0 | Brazil |
|---|---|---|
| Legerton 6'; Whittington 14', 62'; Browne 22', 30', 66', 70'; Pierre 55'; Newalld 61' | Report |

Umpires:
Diego Barbas (ARG)
Saleem Aaron (USA)

12 March 2009
17:30

| Mexico | 9–0 | Uruguay |
|---|---|---|
| Rios 4', 14', 55'; Martinez 14', 59'; F. Aguilar 45', 67'; Peraza 47'; Estrada 49' | Report |

Umpires:
Albert Marcano (TRI)
John Hrytsak (CAN)

=== Seventh and eighth place ===
15 March 2009
09:30

| Brazil | 3–1 | Uruguay |
|---|---|---|
| Francisco 21'; Figuti 24'; Reus 59' | Report | M. Tixie 30' |

Umpires:
Gus Soteriades (USA)
Donny Gobinsingh (TRI)

=== Fifth and sixth place ===
15 March 2009
12:00

| Trinidad and Tobago | 5–3 | Mexico |
|---|---|---|
| Browne 37', 40', 43'; Peraza 51'; Moreno 64' | Report | Roberto García 19'; F. Aguilar 22', 33' |

Umpires:
Diego Barbas (ARG)
Fernando Gomez (ARG)

== First to fourth place classification ==
=== Bracket ===
Semi-finals
14 March
Argentina | 3
Canada (a.e.t.) | 4
14 March
United States | 2
Chile | 1

Final
15 March
Canada (a.e.t.) | 2
United States | 1
Third place
15 March
Argentina | 4
Chile | 0

=== Semi-finals ===
14 March 2009
14:00

| Argentina | 3–4 (a.e.t.) | Canada |
|---|---|---|
| L. Vila 34'; Gilardi 39'; Barra 64' | Report | Pearson 20'; Deol 61'; Singh 67'; Grimes 80' |

Umpires:
Gus Soteriades (USA)
Daniel Lopez Ramos (URU)

14 March 2009
16:30

| United States | 2–1 | Chile |
|---|---|---|
| P. Harris 30'; Cunningham 64' | Report | Kannegiesser 68' |

Umpires:
Nathan Stagno (GIB)
Eduardo Lizana (ESP)

=== Third and fourth place ===
15 March 2009
14:30

| Argentina | 4–0 | Chile |
|---|---|---|
| L. Vila 20'; R. Vila 45', 67'; Almada 64' | Report |

Umpires:
John Hrytsak (CAN)
Saleem Aaron (USA)

=== Final ===
15 March 2009
17:00

| Canada | 2–1 (a.e.t.) | United States |
|---|---|---|
| Tupper 61'; Wettlaufer 74' | Report | P. Harris 2' |

Umpires:
Nathan Stagno (GIB)
Eduardo Lizana (ESP)

== Statistics ==
=== Final standings ===
| Pos | Team | Qualification |
|---|---|---|
| 1st place, gold medalist(s) | Canada | 2010 World Cup |
| 2nd place, silver medalist(s) | United States | 2010 World Cup Qualifiers |
| 3rd place, bronze medalist(s) | Argentina | 2010 World Cup Qualifiers |
| 4 | Chile (H) | 2010 World Cup Qualifiers |
| 5 | Trinidad and Tobago | |
| 6 | Mexico | |
| 7 | Brazil | |
| 8 | Uruguay | |

Source: PAHF
(H) Host

=== Awards ===
| Top Goalscorer | Player of the Tournament | Goalkeeper of the Tournament | Fair Play Trophy |
|---|---|---|---|
| (Trinidad and Tobago) Kwandwane Browne | (Canada) Rob Short | (Canada) David Carter | Mexico |

== See also ==
- 2004 Women's Pan American Cup
