= Field hockey at the Pan American Games =

- Most recent season or competition: Field hockey at the 2023 Pan American Games
- Sport: Field hockey
- Founded: 1967; 59 years ago
- First season: 1967
- No. of teams: 8
- Confederation: PAHF (Americas)
- Most recent champions: M: Argentina (11th title); W: Argentina (8th title)
- Most titles: M: Argentina (11 titles); W: Argentina (8 titles)
- Qualification: Men's Pan American Cup; Women's Pan American Cup; CAC Games; South American Games

The winner of the field hockey event of the Pan American Games qualifies for the Summer Olympics in the following year.

Women's field hockey was introduced at the 1987 edition, and has served as the Olympics qualifying event since 1999.

== Men's tournament ==
=== Results ===
Year	Host	Gold medal match			Bronze medal match			Number of teams
Year	Host	Gold medal	Score	Silver medal	Bronze medal	Score	Fourth place	Number of teams
1967; Details	Winnipeg, Canada	Argentina	5–0	Trinidad and Tobago	United States	1–0	Canada	8
1971; Details	Cali, Colombia	Argentina	1–0	Mexico	Canada	1–0	Chile	8
1975; Details	Mexico City, Mexico	Argentina	1–0	Canada	Mexico	2–0	Jamaica	7
1979; Details	San Juan, Puerto Rico	Argentina	3–0	Canada	Mexico	5–3 (a.e.t.)	Cuba	10
1983; Details	Caracas, Venezuela	Canada	3–1	Argentina	Chile	1–0	United States	9
1987; Details	Indianapolis, United States	Canada	3–1	Argentina	United States	3–2	Chile	10
1991; Details	Havana, Cuba	Argentina	3–0	Canada	United States	7–1	Barbados	10
1995; Details	Mar del Plata, Argentina	Argentina	1–0	Canada	United States	3–2	Cuba	7
1999; Details	Winnipeg, Canada	Canada	1–0	Argentina	Cuba	6–0	Chile	7
2003; Details	Santo Domingo, Dominican Republic	Argentina	1–0	Canada	Cuba	6–2	Chile	8
2007; Details	Rio de Janeiro, Brazil	Canada	2–2 (a.e.t.) (5–4 p.s.)	Argentina	Chile	5–3	Trinidad and Tobago	8
2011; Details	Guadalajara, Mexico	Argentina	3–1	Canada	Chile	4–3	Cuba	8
2015; Details	Toronto, Canada	Argentina	3–0	Canada	Chile	4–1	Brazil	8
2019; Details	Lima, Peru	Argentina	5–2	Canada	United States	2–1	Chile	8
2023; Details	Santiago, Chile	Argentina	3–1	Chile	Canada	3–2	United States	8
2027; Details	Lima, Peru							8

=== Summary ===
Team	Gold medal	Silver medal	Bronze medal	Fourth place
Argentina	11 (1967, 1971, 1975, 1979, 1991, 1995*, 2003, 2011, 2015, 2019, 2023)	4 (1983, 1987, 1999, 2007)		
Canada	4 (1983, 1987, 1999*, 2007)	8 (1975, 1979, 1991, 1995, 2003, 2011, 2015*, 2019)	2 (1971, 2023)	1 (1967*)
Chile		1 (2023*)	4 (1983, 2007, 2011, 2015)	5 (1971, 1987, 1999, 2003, 2019)
Mexico		1 (1971)	2 (1975*, 1979)	
Trinidad and Tobago		1 (1967)		1 (2007)
United States			5 (1967, 1987*, 1991, 1995, 2019)	2 (1983, 2023)
Cuba			2 (1999, 2003)	3 (1979, 1995, 2011)
Barbados				1 (1991)
Brazil				1 (2015)
Jamaica				1 (1975)

* = hosts

=== Team appearances ===
Team	(Canada) 1967	(Colombia) 1971	(Mexico) 1975	(Puerto Rico) 1979	(Venezuela) 1983	(United States) 1987	(Cuba) 1991	(Argentina) 1995	(Canada) 1999	(Dominican Republic) 2003	(Brazil) 2007	(Mexico) 2011	(Canada) 2015	(Peru) 2019	(Chile) 2023	(Peru) 2027	Total
Argentina	1st	1st	1st	1st	2nd	2nd	1st	1st	2nd	1st	2nd	1st	1st	1st	1st	Q	16
Barbados	–	–	–	7th	9th	6th	4th	–	–	7th	–	8th	–	–	–	–	6
Bermuda	7th	–	–	–	–	8th	–	–	–	–	–	–	–	–	–	–	2
Brazil	–	–	–	–	–	–	–	–	–	–	8th	–	4th	–	5th	–	3
Canada	4th	3rd	2nd	2nd	1st	1st	2nd	2nd	1st	2nd	1st	2nd	2nd	2nd	3rd	Q	16
Chile	–	4th	5th	5th	3rd	4th	5th	6th	4th	4th	3rd	3rd	3rd	4th	2nd	Q	15
Cuba	–	–	–	4th	6th	–	6th	4th	3rd	3rd	5th	4th	8th	6th	–	Q	11
Dominican Republic	–	–	–	–	–	–	–	–	–	8th	–	–	–	–	–	–	1
Guyana	–	8th	7th	–	–	–	10th	–	–	–	–	–	–	–	–	–	3
Jamaica	5th	6th	4th	8th	–	9th	9th	–	–	–	–	–	–	–	–	–	6
Mexico	6th	2nd	3rd	3rd	5th	7th	–	–	7th	–	–	6th	6th	7th	6th	Q	12
Netherlands Antilles	8th	–	–	–	–	–	–	–	–	–	6th	Defunct					2
Paraguay	–	–	–	–	–	–	–	7th	–	–	–	–	–	–	–	–	1
Peru	–	–	–	–	–	10th	–	–	–	–	–	–	–	8th	8th	Q	4
Puerto Rico	–	–	–	10th	–	–	–	–	–	–	–	–	–	–	–	–	1
Trinidad and Tobago	2nd	7th	–	9th	7th	5th	7th	5th	6th	6th	4th	7th	7th	5th	7th	Q	15
United States	3rd	5th	6th	6th	4th	3rd	3rd	3rd	5th	5th	7th	5th	5th	3rd	4th	Q	16
Venezuela	–	–	–	–	8th	–	8th	–	–	–	–	–	–	–	–	–	2
Total	8	8	7	10	9	10	10	7	7	8	8	8	8	8	8	8	

== Women's tournament ==
=== Results ===
Year	Host	Gold medal match			Bronze medal match			Number of teams
Year	Host	Gold medal	Score	Silver medal	Bronze medal	Score	Fourth place	Number of teams
1987; Details	Indianapolis, United States	Argentina	3–2	United States	Canada	5–0	Trinidad and Tobago	7
1991; Details	Havana, Cuba	Argentina	0–0 (a.e.t.) (3–1 p.s.)	Canada	United States	7–0	Mexico	8
1995; Details	Mar del Plata, Argentina	Argentina	3–2	United States	Canada	4–0	Cuba	7
1999; Details	Winnipeg, Canada	Argentina	5–2	United States	Canada	2–0	Trinidad and Tobago	7
2003; Details	Santo Domingo, Dominican Republic	Argentina	3–1	United States	Uruguay	2–2 (a.e.t.) (5–4 p.s.)	Chile	8
2007; Details	Rio de Janeiro, Brazil	Argentina	4–2	United States	Netherlands Antilles	2–1	Chile	8
2011; Details	Guadalajara, Mexico	United States	4–2	Argentina	Chile	3–0	Canada	8
2015; Details	Toronto, Canada	United States	2–1	Argentina	Canada	1–0	Chile	8
2019; Details	Lima, Peru	Argentina	5–1	Canada	United States	5–1	Chile	8
2023; Details	Santiago, Chile	Argentina	2–1	United States	Chile	2–0	Canada	8
2027; Details	Lima, Peru							8

=== Summary ===
Team	Gold medal	Silver medal	Bronze medal	Fourth place
Argentina	8 (1987, 1991, 1995*, 1999, 2003, 2007, 2019, 2023)	2 (2011, 2015)		
United States	2 (2011, 2015)	6 (1987*, 1995, 1999, 2003, 2007, 2023)	2 (1991, 2019)	
Canada		2 (1991, 2019)	4 (1987, 1995, 1999*, 2015*)	2 (2011, 2023)
Chile			2 (2011, 2023*)	4 (2003, 2007, 2015, 2019)
Uruguay			1 (2003)	
Netherlands Antilles			1 (2007)	
Trinidad and Tobago				2 (1987, 1999)
Mexico				1 (1991)
Cuba				1 (1995)

* = hosts

=== Team appearances ===
Team	(United States) 1987	(Cuba) 1991	(Argentina) 1995	(Canada) 1999	(Dominican Republic) 2003	(Brazil) 2007	(Mexico) 2011	(Canada) 2015	(Peru) 2019	(Chile) 2023	(Peru) 2027	Total
Argentina	1st	1st	1st	1st	1st	1st	2nd	2nd	1st	1st	Q	11
Barbados	5th	8th	–	–	–	–	8th	–	–	–		3
Bermuda	7th	–	–	–	–	–	–	–	–	–		1
Brazil	–	–	–	–	–	8th	–	–	–	–		1
Canada	3rd	2nd	3rd	3rd	5th	5th	4th	3rd	2nd	4th		10
Chile	–	–	–	6th	4th	4th	3rd	4th	4th	3rd		7
Cuba	–	6th	4th	5th	–	6th	5th	8th	8th	6th		8
Dominican Republic	–	–	–	–	8th	–	–	7th	–	–		2
Jamaica	6th	5th	6th	–	7th	–	–	–	–	–		4
Mexico	–	4th	–	7th	–	–	6th	6th	6th	8th		6
Netherlands Antilles	–	–	–	–	–	3rd	Defunct					1
Paraguay	–	–	7th	–	–	–	–	–	–	–		1
Peru	–	–	–	–	–	–	–	–	7th	–	Q	2
Trinidad and Tobago	4th	7th	5th	4th	6th	–	7th	–	–	7th		7
United States	2nd	3rd	2nd	2nd	2nd	2nd	1st	1st	3rd	2nd		10
Uruguay	–	–	–	–	3rd	7th	–	5th	5th	5th		5
Total	7	8	7	7	8	8	8	8	8	8	8	

== Medal table ==
=== Total ===
Rank	Nation	Gold	Silver	Bronze	Total
1	Argentina	19	6	0	25
2	Canada	4	10	6	20
3	United States	2	6	7	15
4	Chile	0	1	6	7
5	Mexico	0	1	2	3
6	Trinidad and Tobago	0	1	0	1
7	Cuba	0	0	2	2
8	Netherlands Antilles	0	0	1	1
8	Uruguay	0	0	1	1
Totals (9 entries)		25	25	25	75

=== Men ===
Rank	Nation	Gold	Silver	Bronze	Total
1	Argentina	11	4	0	15
2	Canada	4	8	2	14
3	Chile	0	1	4	5
4	Mexico	0	1	2	3
5	Trinidad and Tobago	0	1	0	1
6	United States	0	0	5	5
7	Cuba	0	0	2	2
Totals (7 entries)		15	15	15	45

=== Women ===
Rank	Nation	Gold	Silver	Bronze	Total
1	Argentina	8	2	0	10
2	United States	2	6	2	10
3	Canada	0	2	4	6
4	Chile	0	0	2	2
5	Netherlands Antilles	0	0	1	1
5	Uruguay	0	0	1	1
Totals (6 entries)		10	10	10	30

== See also ==
- Men's Pan American Cup
- Women's Pan American Cup
