= Field hockey at the 2023 Pan American Games – Men's team rosters =

This article shows the rosters of all participating teams at the men's field hockey tournament at the 2023 Pan American Games in Santiago, Chile. Rosters can have a maximum of 16 athletes.

Age and caps as of 26 September 2023 and clubs for which they played in the 2023 season.

== Pool B ==
=== Canada ===
The following 16 players were named to the Canada squad:

Head coach: Patrick Tshutshani

No.	Pos.	Player	Date of birth (age)	Caps	Goals	Club
30	GK	Ethan McTavish	1 May 2000 (aged 23)	4	0	
16	DF	Gordon Johnston	30 January 1993 (aged 30)	198	68	
	DF					
	DF					

=== United States ===
The following 16 players were named to the United States squad:

Head coach: (India) Harendra Singh

No.	Pos.	Player	Date of birth (age)	Caps	Goals	Club
1	GK	Jonathan Klages	14 May 1997 (aged 26)	50	0	
