= Guyana national field hockey team =

Guyana national field hockey team may refer to:

- Guyana men's national field hockey team
- Guyana women's national field hockey team
