= Tomás Argento =

Argentine field hockey player

Personal information
- Born: 24 September 1986 (age 39) Buenos Aires, Argentina

Sport
- Sport: Field hockey
- Position: Forward
National team
Years	Team	Caps	Goals
–	Argentina		-
Medal record
Men's field hockey
Representing Argentina
Pan American Games
Gold medal – first place	2011 Guadalajara	Team
Silver medal – second place	2007 Rio de Janeiro	Team
Champions Trophy
Bronze medal – third place	2008 Rotterdam	Team
Champions Challenge
Gold medal – first place	2005 Alexandria	Team
Gold medal – first place	2007 Boom	Team

Tomás Argento (born 24 September 1986 in Buenos Aires) is a field hockey striker from Argentina, who made his debut for the national squad in 2005, after having played the Junior World Cup in Rotterdam, The Netherlands. He finished in tenth position with his national team at the 2006 Men's Hockey World Cup in Mönchengladbach. Tomás won two medals at the Pan American Games, two at the Champions Challenge and one at the Champions Trophy.

Now, alongside his brother he owns a hockey and soccer club called Club cerro pilar.
