= Field hockey at the 2007 Pan American Games – Men's Qualifier =

Men's field hockey qualifier for the 2007 Pan American Games
Tournament details
- Host country: Bermuda
- City: Hamilton
- Dates: 8–11 March
- Teams: 2 (from 1 confederation)

Final positions
- Champions: United States
- Runner-up: Mexico

Tournament statistics
- Matches played: 3
- Goals scored: 12 (4 per match)

The Men's Field Hockey Qualifier for the 2007 Pan American Games was a field hockey series between the United States and Mexico to determine the last entry into the men's field hockey competition at the 2007 Pan American Games. All games were played in Hamilton, Bermuda from 8 to 11 March 2007.

The United States won the series and qualified for the 2007 Pan American Games.

== Results ==
=== Standings ===
Pos	Team	Pld	W	D	L	GF	GA	GD	Pts	Qualification
1	United States	3	2	1	0	10	2	+8	7	2007 Pan American Games
2	Mexico	3	0	1	2	2	10	−8	1	

Source: PAHF
Rules for classification: 1) Points; 2) Goal difference; 3) Goals for; 4) Extra time; 5) Penalty strokes.

=== Matches ===
8 March 2007
18:00

United States	3–0	Mexico
	Report

10 March 2007
14:00

United States	1–1	Mexico
	Report

11 March 2007
15:00

United States	6–1	Mexico
	Report
