= 2016 FIH Masters Hockey World Cup – Men's Over 50 =

2016 Masters Hockey World Cup Over 50 Men
Tournament details
- Host country: Australia
- City: Canberra
- Teams: 8
- Venue(s): National Hockey Centre

Final positions
- Champions: England
- Runner-up: Australia
- Third place: New Zealand

Tournament statistics
- Matches played: 24
- Goals scored: 121 (5.04 per match)
- Top scorer(s): (England) Andrew Batchelor (8 goals)

The Men's Over 50 field hockey tournament was one of four men's competitions played at the 2016 FIH Masters Hockey World Cup.

England won the tournament after defeating Australia 3–1 in the final. New Zealand won the bronze medal by defeating Germany 3–0 in the third and fourth place playoff.

== Participating nations ==
Including the host nation, 8 teams participated in the tournament:

- Australia (host nation)
- Canada
- England
- Germany
- Malaysia
- New Zealand
- South Africa
- United States

== Results ==
=== First round ===
==== Pool A ====
Pos	Team	Pld	W	D	L	GF	GA	GD	Pts
1	New Zealand	3	3	0	0	9	1	+8	9
2	Germany	3	1	1	1	6	7	−1	4
3	United States	3	0	2	1	3	7	−4	2
4	Malaysia	3	0	1	2	5	8	−3	1

Source: Masters
Rules for classification: 1) points; 2) goal difference; 3) goals scored; 4) head-to-head result.

30 March 2016
08:20

Germany	0–2	New Zealand
	Report	Johnson 17'; Brett 61'

Umpires:
Carl Mueller (AUS)
Clive St. Dare (RSA)

30 March 2016
10:10

Malaysia	1–1	United States
Inderjit 60'	Report	Pereira 51'

Umpires:
Andrew Whitehead (NZL)
Michael Broughton (RSA)

31 March 2016
11:40

New Zealand	3–1	Malaysia
van Riele 32'; Sutherland 46'; Vautier 52'	Report	Gregory 51'

Umpires:
Scott O'Reilley (AUS)
Clive St. Dare (RSA)

31 March 2016
13:30

United States	2–2	Germany
Pereira 4'; Jones 20'	Report	Metzer 42', 45'

Umpires:
Andrew Brydon (NZL)
Richard Arthur (AUS)

1 April 2016
15:40

Germany	4–3	Malaysia
Metzer 16', 59'; Boness 22'; Kiran 68'	Report	Sarjit 20', 32', 61'

Umpires:
Mike Marsh (USA)
Scott Orth (AUS)

1 April 2016
17:30

New Zealand	4–0	United States
Brett 22'; Butcher 38'; Teague 62'; Sutherland 68'	Report

Umpires:
Kristen Schenk (AUS)
David Coles (AUS)

==== Pool B ====
Pos	Team	Pld	W	D	L	GF	GA	GD	Pts
1	England	3	3	0	0	24	4	+20	9
2	Australia	3	2	0	1	16	4	+12	6
3	South Africa	3	0	1	2	1	10	−9	1
4	Canada	3	0	1	2	2	25	−23	1

Source: Masters
Rules for classification: 1) points; 2) goal difference; 3) goals scored; 4) head-to-head result.

=== Second round ===
Fifth place
United States	1
South Africa	0
Seventh place
Canada	0
Malaysia	4

Consolation semifinals
Canada	0
United States	2
South Africa	6
Malaysia	4

Quarterfinals
New Zealand	10
Canada	0
Australia	3
United States	0
Germany (p.s.o.)	1 (2)
South Africa	1 (1)
England	4
Malaysia	0

Semifinals
New Zealand	1
Australia	2
Germany	1
England	8

Final
Australia	1
England	3
Third place
New Zealand	3
Germany	0
