= Chile men's national field hockey team =

Chile
- Nickname(s): La Roja (The Red)
- Association: Federación Chilena de Hockey Sobre Césped
- Confederation: PAHF (Americas)
- Head Coach: Jorge Dabanch
- Assistant coach(es): Emiliano Monteleone
- Manager: Cristian González
- Captain: Fernando Renz
Home	Away

FIH ranking
- Current: 22 ▲2 (23 September 2026)

World Cup
- Appearances: 1 (first in 2023)
- Best result: 15th (2023)

Pan American Games
- Appearances: 14 (first in 1971)
- Best result: 2nd (2023)

Pan American Cup
- Appearances: 7 (first in 2000)
- Best result: 2nd (2022)
Medal record
Event	1st	2nd	3rd
Pan American Games	0	1	4
Pan American Cup	0	1	1
South American Games	0	5	0
South American Championship	1	4	0
Bolivarian Games	1	1	0
Total	2	12	5
Pan American Games
Silver medal – second place	2023 Santiago	Team
Bronze medal – third place	1983 Caracas	Team
Bronze medal – third place	2007 Rio de Janeiro	Team
Bronze medal – third place	2011 Guadalajara	Team
Bronze medal – third place	2015 Toronto	Team
Pan American Cup
Silver medal – second place	2022 Santiago	
Bronze medal – third place	2004 London	
South American Games
Silver medal – second place	2006 Buenos Aires	Team
Silver medal – second place	2014 Santiago	Team
Silver medal – second place	2018 Cochabamba	Team
Silver medal – second place	2022 Asunción	Team
Silver medal – second place	2026 Santa Fe	Team
South American Championship
Gold medal – first place	2016 Chiclayo	
Silver medal – second place	2003 Santiago	
Silver medal – second place	2008 Montevideo	
Silver medal – second place	2010 Rio de Janeiro	
Silver medal – second place	2013 Santiago	
Bolivarian Games
Gold medal – first place	2025 Lima	Team
Silver medal – second place	2013 Chiclayo	Team

The Chile men's national field hockey team represents Chile in men's international field hockey competitions and is controlled by the Federación Chilena de Hockey Sobre Césped. It is affiliated with the International Hockey Federation and the Pan American Hockey Federation.

Hockey arrived in Chile in the mid-20th century. Chile has never qualified for the Hockey World Cup until 2021, but it has had success at the youth level, as in Versailles 1979. In the Pan American Games, Chile has been present in all years except the year 1967, obtaining a 3rd-place finish in 1983, 2007, 2011 and 2015. By reaching the final of the 2022 Men's Pan American Cup, they qualified for the 2023 World Cup where they made their World Cup debut.

== Tournament history ==
=== World Cup ===
Men's FIH Hockey World Cup record
Year	Round	Position	Pld	W	D*	L	GF	GA
(India) 2023	Classification round	15th	5	0	0	5	5	32
Total		1/15	5	0	0	5	5	32

=== Pan American Games ===
Pan American Games record
Year	Host	Position	Pld	W	D	L	GF	GA
1967	Winnipeg, Canada	did not participate						
1971	Cali, Colombia	4th	10	4	1	5	9	12
1975	Mexico City, Mexico	5th	7	2	2	3	9	13
1979	San Juan, Puerto Rico	5th	6	3	1	2	11	10
1983	Caracas, Venezuela	3rd	5	3	0	2	11	9
1987	Indianapolis, United States	4th	6	3	1	2	12	13
1991	Havana, Cuba	5th	6	4	1	1	13	8
1995	Mar del Plata, Argentina	6th	6	1	0	5	8	19
1999	Winnipeg, Canada	4th	7	2	2	3	11	22
2003	Santo Domingo, Dominican Republic	4th	5	1	1	3	28	10
2007	Rio de Janeiro, Brazil	3rd	5	3	0	2	11	12
2011	Guadalajara, Mexico	3rd	5	3	0	2	17	16
2015	Toronto, Canada	3rd	6	4	0	2	16	13
2019	Lima, Peru	4th	6	3	0	3	12	10
2023	Santiago, Chile	2nd	5	2	1	2	23	7
2027	Lima, Peru	Qualified						
Total		2nd place	85	38	10	37	191	174

=== Pan American Cup ===
Pan American Cup record
Year	Host	Position	Pld	W	D*	L	GF	GA
2000	Havana, Cuba	4th	6	3	0	3	27	19
2004	London, Canada	3rd	7	5	0	2	34	10
2009	Santiago, Chile	4th	5	2	1	2	20	11
2013	Brampton, Canada	5th	5	3	1	1	28	10
2017	Lancaster, United States	6th	5	2	1	2	19	15
2022	Santiago, Chile	2nd	5	2	1	2	11	9
2025	Montevideo, Uruguay	4th	5	3	1	1	16	3
Total		2nd place	38	20	5	13	155	77

=== South American Games ===
South American Games record
Year	Round	Position	Pld	W	D*	L	GF	GA
(Argentina) 2006	Final	2nd	5	3	1	1	25	7
(Chile) 2014	Final	2nd	6	4	0	2	21	16
(Bolivia) 2018	Final	2nd	5	4	0	1	22	1
(Paraguay) 2022	Final	2nd	5	4	0	1	53	3
(Argentina) 2026	Final	2nd	5	3	0	2	19	9
Total	Best: 2nd	5/5	26	18	1	7	140	36

=== South American Championship ===
South American Championship
Year	Position	Pld	W	D*	L	GF	GA
(Chile) 2003	2nd	5	4	0	1	62	3
(Uruguay) 2008	2nd	6	5	0	1	27	4
(Brazil) 2010	2nd	6	4	0	2	35	10
(Chile) 2013	2nd	6	4	0	2	45	11
(Peru) 2016	1st	5	5	0	0	44	0
Total	1 title	28	22	0	6	213	28

=== Bolivarian Games ===
Bolivarian Games record
Year	Host	Position	Pld	W	D	L	GF	GA
2013	Chiclayo, Peru	2nd	6	4	0	2	52	7
2025	Lima, Peru	1st	5	5	0	0	60	2
Total		1st place	11	9	0	2	112	9

=== Defunct competitions ===
==== Hockey World League ====
Hockey World League record
Season	Position	Round	Pld	W	D*	L	GF	GA
2012–13	20th	Round 1	3	2	0	1	12	6
2012–13	20th	Round 2	5	3	0	2	9	13
2014–15	26th	Round 1	3	3	0	0	26	2
2014–15	26th	Round 2	6	1	2	3	8	19
2016–17	32nd	Round 1	5	5	0	0	44	0
2016–17	32nd	Round 2	6	1	2	3	9	16
Total	Best: 20th	Round 2	28	15	4	9	108	56

==== Champions Challenge II ====
Champions Challenge II record
Year	Position	Pld	W	D*	L	GF	GA
(Ireland) 2009	8th	5	0	0	5	5	15
(France) 2011	did not participate						
Total	Best: 8th	5	0	0	5	5	15

*Draws include matches decided on a penalty shoot-out.

== Team ==
=== Current squad ===
The squad for the 2023 Men's FIH Hockey World Cup.

Head coach: Jorge Dabanch

No.	Pos.	Player	Date of birth (age)	Caps	Club
1	GK	Agustín Araya	2 August 1999 (aged 23)	25	(Chile) Manquehue
4	DF	Pablo Purcell	23 June 1993 (aged 29)	80	(Chile) PWCC
5	GK	Adrián Henríquez	14 July 1986 (aged 36)	130	(Chile) Manquehue
6	MF	Vicente Goñi	30 November 1995 (aged 27)	58	(Netherlands) Tilburg
8	MF	Fernando Renz (Captain)	15 February 1994 (aged 28)	82	(Chile) Manquehue
9	DF	José Maldonado	4 November 1994 (aged 28)	99	(Chile) PWCC
10	FW	Martín Rodríguez	26 March 1990 (aged 32)	170	(Chile) Sport Francés
11	MF	Kay Gesswein	28 August 1999 (aged 23)	24	(Chile) Manquehue
13	DF	Andrés Pizarro	7 December 1999 (aged 23)	45	(Chile) PWCC
14	DF	Juan Amoroso	8 July 1997 (aged 25)	68	(Belgium) Royal Uccle
15	MF	José Hurtado	18 March 1999 (aged 23)	55	(Chile) Manquehue
17	FW	Felipé Renz	29 April 1997 (aged 25)	55	(Netherlands) Victoria
18	FW	Ignacio Contardo	13 June 1994 (aged 28)	59	(Chile) PWCC
20	FW	Raimundo Valenzuela	10 May 2002 (aged 20)	16	(Netherlands) Almere
24	DF	Axel Richter	8 November 1994 (aged 28)	54	(Chile) Manquehue
26	MF	Axel Troncoso	25 February 1997 (aged 25)	55	(Chile) Manquehue
28	FW	Nils Strabucchi	28 April 1999 (aged 23)	34	(Germany) UHC Hamburg
31	FW	Franco Beccera	2 December 1997 (aged 25)	41	(Chile) Manquehue

=== Recent call–ups ===
The following players have also represented Chile in the last 12 months.

Pos.	Player	Date of birth (age)	Caps	Goals	Club	Latest call-up
DF	Agustín Valenzuela	30 September 2000 (age 25)	5	0	(Chile) PWCC	v. Spain; 15 August 2022
FW	Vicente Gabilondo	13 December 1996 (age 29)	6	0	(Chile) Manquehue	v. Spain; 15 August 2022
FW	William Enos	7 June 1992 (age 34)	20	4	(Spain) Catalònia Hoquei Club	v. Spain; 15 August 2022

== Results and fixtures ==
The following is a list of match results in the last 12 months, as well as any future matches that have been scheduled.

Win Draw Loss Fixture

=== 2026 ===
01 March 2026 WC Qualifiers GS	Wales	2–2	Chile	Santiago, Chile
19:45	Morgan 4'; Furlong 47'	Report	R.Valenzuela 22'; A.Valenzuela 23'	Stadium: Estadio Nacional del Hockey Césped Claudia Schüler

03 March 2026 WC Qualifiers GS	Scotland	2–2	Chile	Santiago, Chile
20:15	J. Golden 35'; Walker 54'	Report	Wolansky 32'; Amoroso 54'	Stadium: Estadio Nacional del Hockey Césped Claudia Schüler

04 March 2026 WC Qualifiers GS	France	3–3	Chile	Santiago, Chile
20:15	Charlet 21', 51'; Marqué 56'	Report	Amoroso 15', 57'; Goñi 37'	Stadium: Estadio Nacional del Hockey Césped Claudia Schüler

06 March 2026 WC Qualifiers Crossover	Canada	3–2	Chile	Santiago, Chile
15:00	Loh 14'; Dhillon 50'; Davis 59'	Report	J. Amoroso 5'; R. Valenzuela 15'	Stadium: Estadio Nacional del Hockey Césped Claudia Schüler

07 March 2026 WC Qualifiers Seventh and eighth place	South Korea	0–0 (1–4 p)	Chile	Santiago, Chile
13:30		Report		Stadium: Estadio Nacional del Hockey Césped Claudia Schüler
	Penalties
	Rim (penalty shoot-out missed); Bae (penalty shoot-out missed); Jin (penalty shoot-out scored)		(penalty shoot-out scored) Hurtado; (penalty shoot-out scored) Labbe; (penalty shoot-out scored) J. Amoroso; (penalty shoot-out scored) Gesswein

26 July 2026 Test 1	Wales	5–1	Chile	Cardiff, Wales
13:00	Furlong 8', 43'; Pritchard 8', 42'; Morgan 41'	Report	Amoroso 2'	Stadium: The National Hockey Centre, Sophia Gardens

28 July 2026 Test 2	Wales	5–1	Chile	Cardiff, Wales
17:30	Furlong 1', 22', 60'; Barker 3'; Bradshaw 11'	Report	Acevedo 58'	Stadium: The National Hockey Centre, Sophia Gardens

29 July 2026 Test 3	Wales	1–0	Chile	Cardiff, Wales
17:30	Tyson 50'	Report		Stadium: The National Hockey Centre, Sophia Gardens

2 August 2026 Test 1	Scotland	1–0	Chile	Edinburgh, Scotland
12:30	Orr 52'	Report		Stadium: Peffermill Playing Fields, The University of Edinburgh

4 August 2026 Test 2	Scotland	2–0	Chile	Edinburgh, Scotland
19:30	Golden 44'; Robb 46'	Report		Stadium: Peffermill Playing Fields, The University of Edinburgh

13 September 2026 2026 ODESUR Pool A	Chile	7–0	Peru	Santa Fe, Argentina
11:00	Valenzuela 5'; Contardo 19'; Amoroso 21'; Hurtado 25'; Acevedo 39'; Wolansky 41'; Gesswein 58'	Report		Stadium: Estadio Asociacion Santafesina de Hockey

15 September 2026 2026 ODESUR Pool A	Chile	6–0	Uruguay	Santa Fe, Argentina
12:00	Contardo 12', 24'; Strabucchi 33', 44'; Stein 52'; Acevedo 54'	Report		Stadium: Estadio Asociacion Santafesina de Hockey

18 September 2026 2026 ODESUR Pool A	Chile	1–5	Argentina	Santa Fe, Argentina
14:00	Amoroso 30+'	Report	Agostini 3'; Tarazona 13'; Costa 39'; Rodriguez 43'; Ferreiro 52'	Stadium: Estadio Asociacion Santafesina de Hockey

19 September 2026 2026 ODESUR Pool A	Brazil	1–4	Chile	Santa Fe, Argentina
12:00	van der Heijden 5'	Report	Wolansky 15'; Valenzuela 23'; Contardo 30' de Witt 55'	Stadium: Estadio Asociacion Santafesina de Hockey

22 September 2026 2026 ODESUR Gold medal match	Argentina	3–1	Chile	Santa Fe, Argentina
13:30	Tarazona 14'; Ferreiro 17'; Agostini 45'	Report	Contardo 52'	Stadium: Estadio Asociacion Santafesina de Hockey

== See also ==
- Chile women's national field hockey team
