= 2016 FIH Masters Hockey World Cup =

2016 field hockey competition

Tournament details
- Host country: Australia
- Dates: 24 March 2016–6 April 2016
- Venue: National Hockey Centre (in Canberra host cities)

The 2016 FIH Masters Hockey World Cup was a field hockey event held between 29 March – 6 April in Canberra, Australia. The event comprised a series of tournaments in both male and female competitions.

The most successful men's teams at the 2016 FIH Masters Hockey World Cup were Australia and England, who each won two titles, while the Australian women's teams were the most successful winning three of five titles.

== Age Groups ==
Across both the men's and women's tournaments, a total five age groups were played:

Men

- Over 40's
- Over 45's
- Over 50's
- Over 55's

Women

- Over 40's
- Over 45's
- Over 50's
- Over 55's
- Over 60's

== Results ==
=== Men ===
==== Summaries ====
Age group	Final			Third place match
Age group	Winner	Score	Runner-up	Third place	Score	Fourth place
Over 40's Details	Australia	4–3	England	New Zealand	2–0	Malaysia
Over 45's Details	Australia	3–1	England	New Zealand	13–1	Ireland
Over 50's Details	England	3–1	Australia	New Zealand	3–0	Germany
Over 55's Details	England	4–1	Australia	Scotland	2–1	Wales

=== Women ===
==== Summaries ====
Age group	Final			Third place match
Age group	Winner	Score	Runner-up	Third place	Score	Fourth place
Over 40's Details	Australia	4–1	England	New Zealand	6–2	Wales
Over 45's Details	Australia	1–1 (4–3 p.s.o.)	New Zealand	United States	1–1 (4–1 p.s.o.)	South Africa
Over 50's Details	Australia	2–3	Ireland	New Zealand	8–0	Wales
Over 55's Details	England	2–0	New Zealand	Australia	4–2	Wales
Over 60's Details	New Zealand	1–0	England	Australia	4–2	Wattles (AFG)
