= Argentine Hockey Confederation =

Governing body of field hockey in Argentina

Argentine Hockey Confederation Confederación Argentina de Hockey
- Sport: Field Hockey
- Category: Games
- Jurisdiction: Argentina
- Founded: 1908; 118 years ago
- Affiliation: FIH
- Regional affiliation: PAHF
- Headquarters: Buenos Aires, Argentina
- President: Aníbal Fernández
- CEO: Carlos Rafael Pirlo
- Vice president(s): Patricio López; Delfina Otero; Jorge Gómez
- Secretary: Carlos Rafael Pirlo
- Men's coach: Mariano Ronconi
- Women's coach: Fernando Ferrara

Official website
- www.cahockey.org.ar

The Argentine Hockey Confederation (Spanish: Confederación Argentina de Hockey) is the official governing body of field hockey in Argentina. It governs the men's and the women's national teams and club competitions "Liga Nacional de Hockey" (LNH) and "Argentino de Clubes".

Other local competitions, such as the Women's and Men's Torneo Metropolitano are regulated by the Buenos Aires Hockey Association (AHBA).

More than 30 regional associations are affiliated to CAH, covering the most important provinces of Argentina.

== History ==
The Argentine Hockey Confederation was established on August 26, 1908, formed by three clubs: Club Atlético San Isidro, Belgrano Athletic and Pacific Railway A.C. The first president was Thomas Bell, owner of Buenos Aires Herald, a newspaper by the British community of Argentina. The Confederation registered to Hockey Association of England (established 1875).

In 1909 the AHC allowed women's teams to join the association. The first team registered was Belgrano Ladies, that played its inaugural game on August 25 vs. St. Catherine's School, being defeated by 1-0.

== See also ==
- Argentina women's national field hockey team (Las Leonas)
- Argentina men's national field hockey team (Los Leones)
- Buenos Aires Hockey Association (AHBA)
