= Field hockey at the 1971 Pan American Games =

- Dates: 1–12 August 1971
- Teams: 8

Medalists
Gold medal	Argentina (2nd title)
Silver medal	Mexico
Bronze medal	Canada

The field hockey tournament at the 1971 Pan American Games was the second edition of the field hockey event at the Pan American Games. It took place in Cali, Colombia from 1 to 12 August 1971.

The defending champions Argentina won their second title in a row by defeating Mexico 1–0 in the final. Canada took the bronze medal by defeating Chile 1–0.

Event	Gold	Silver	Bronze
Men's field hockey	Argentina	Mexico	Canada

== Results ==
=== Round robin ===
Pos	Team	Pld	W	D	L	GF	GA	GD	Pts	Qualification
1	Argentina	7	5	2	0	17	1	+16	12	Semi-finals
2	Canada	7	5	0	2	14	3	+11	10	Semi-finals
3	Mexico	7	3	2	2	5	5	0	8	Semi-finals
4	Chile (Note: Chile and the United States finished on equal points at the conclusion of the pool stage, resulting in an extra match to determine fourth place in the pool, which Chile won 2–1.)	7	3	1	3	7	7	0	7	Semi-finals
5	United States	7	3	1	3	10	15	−5	7	
6	Jamaica	7	1	3	3	3	6	−3	5	
7	Trinidad and Tobago	7	1	2	4	7	12	−5	4	
8	Guyana	7	1	1	5	5	19	−14	3	

Source: TheSports.org
Notes:

1 August 1971

Jamaica	1–1	Trinidad and Tobago

1 August 1971

Mexico	2–1	United States

1 August 1971

Argentina	3–1	Chile

1 August 1971

Canada	5–0	Guyana

2 August 1971

United States	0–0	Trinidad and Tobago

2 August 1971

Jamaica	1–0	Chile

2 August 1971

Canada	1–0	Mexico

2 August 1971

Argentina	4–0	Guyana

3 August 1971

Argentina	0–0	Jamaica

3 August 1971

Chile	2–0	Mexico

3 August 1971

Trinidad and Tobago	5–2	Guyana

3 August 1971

Canada	5–1	United States

5 August 1971

Mexico	1–0	Guyana

5 August 1971

Canada	1–0	Jamaica

5 August 1971

Chile	1–0	Trinidad and Tobago

5 August 1971

Argentina	5–0	United States

6 August 1971

Argentina	1–0	Canada

6 August 1971

Chile	1–1	Guyana

6 August 1971

Mexico	2–1	Trinidad and Tobago

6 August 1971

United States	3–1	Jamaica

7 August 1971

Chile	1–0	Canada

7 August 1971

United States	3–1	Guyana

7 August 1971

Argentina	4–0	Trinidad and Tobago

7 August 1971

Mexico	0–0	Jamaica

8 August 1971

Argentina	0–0	Mexico

8 August 1971

Guyana	1–0	Jamaica

8 August 1971

United States	2–1	Chile

8 August 1971

Canada	2–0	Trinidad and Tobago

==== Fourth place play-off ====
9 August 1971

Chile	2–1	United States

=== First to fourth place classification ===
Semi-finals
10 August
Argentina	3
Chile	0
10 August
Mexico	2
Canada	1

Gold medal match
12 August
Argentina	1
Mexico	0
Bronze medal match
12 August
Canada	1
Chile	0

==== Semi-finals ====
10 August 1971

Argentina	3–0	Chile

10 August 1971

Mexico	2–1	Canada

==== Bronze medal match ====
12 August 1971

Canada	1–0	Chile

==== Gold medal match ====
12 August 1971

Argentina	1–0	Mexico

== Final standings ==
1. Argentina
2. Mexico
3. Canada
4. Chile
5. United States
6. Jamaica
7. Trinidad and Tobago
8. Guyana
