= Field hockey at the 1967 Pan American Games =

- Dates: 24 July – 4 August 1967
- Teams: 8

Medalists
Gold medal	Argentina (1st title)
Silver medal	Trinidad and Tobago
Bronze medal	United States

The field hockey tournament at the 1967 Pan American Games was the first edition of the field hockey event at the Pan American Games. It took place in Winnipeg, Canada from 24 July to 4 August 1967.

Argentina won the first edition of the field hockey event at the Pan American Games by defeating Trinidad and Tobago 5–0 in the final. The United States took the bronze medal by defeating the hosts Canada 1–0.

Event	Gold	Silver	Bronze
Men's field hockey	Argentina	Trinidad and Tobago	United States

== Results ==
=== Round robin ===
Pos	Team	Pld	W	D	L	GF	GA	GD	Pts	Qualification
1	Argentina	7	5	2	0	26	1	+25	12	Semi-finals
2	Canada (H)	7	5	2	0	14	4	+10	12	Semi-finals
3	Trinidad and Tobago	7	4	1	2	11	6	+5	9	Semi-finals
4	United States	7	4	0	3	10	12	−2	8	Semi-finals
5	Jamaica	7	1	5	1	5	3	+2	7	
6	Mexico	7	2	1	4	7	11	−4	5	
7	Bermuda	7	1	1	5	1	18	−17	3	
8	Netherlands Antilles	7	0	0	7	0	19	−19	0	

Source: todor66
(H) Hosts

24 July 1967

Jamaica	0–0	Mexico

24 July 1967

Bermuda	1–0	Netherlands Antilles

24 July 1967

Canada	2–0	Trinidad and Tobago

24 July 1967

Argentina	5–0	United States

25 July 1967

Jamaica	0–0	Bermuda

25 July 1967

Argentina	1–1	Canada

25 July 1967

Trinidad and Tobago	1–0	Netherlands Antilles

25 July 1967

United States	2–1	Mexico

26 July 1967

Canada	1–1	Jamaica

26 July 1967

United States	3–0	Netherlands Antilles

26 July 1967

Trinidad and Tobago	4–0	Bermuda

26 July 1967

Argentina	5–0	Mexico

27 July 1967

United States	1–0	Jamaica

27 July 1967

Trinidad and Tobago	2–1	Mexico

27 July 1967

Canada	3–0	Netherlands Antilles

27 July 1967

Argentina	6–0	Bermuda

28 July 1967

Argentina	2–0	Trinidad and Tobago

28 July 1967

Mexico	3–0	Bermuda

28 July 1967

Canada	3–1	United States

28 July 1967

Jamaica	3–0	Netherlands Antilles

29 July 1967

Argentina	0–0	Jamaica

29 July 1967

Mexico	1–0	Netherlands Antilles

29 July 1967

Canada	2–0	Bermuda

29 July 1967

Trinidad and Tobago	3–0	United States

31 July 1967

Trinidad and Tobago	1–1	Jamaica

31 July 1967

Canada	2–1	Mexico

31 July 1967

United States	3–0	Bermuda

31 July 1967

Argentina	7–0	Netherlands Antilles

=== First to fourth place classification ===
Semi-finals
2 August
Argentina	1
United States	0
2 August
Canada	0
Trinidad and Tobago	2

Gold medal match
4 August
Argentina	5
Trinidad and Tobago	0
Bronze medal match
3 August
United States	1
Canada	0

==== Semi-finals ====
2 August 1967

Argentina	1–0	United States

2 August 1967

Trinidad and Tobago	2–0	Canada

==== Bronze medal match ====
3 August 1967

United States	1–0	Canada

==== Gold medal match ====
4 August 1967

Argentina	5–0	Trinidad and Tobago

== Final standings ==
1. Argentina
2. Trinidad and Tobago
3. United States
4. Canada
5. Jamaica
6. Mexico
7. Bermuda
8. Netherlands Antilles
