= Field hockey at the 2007 Pan American Games – Men's tournament =

Men's field hockey at the 2007 Pan American Games
Tournament details
- Host country: Brazil
- City: Rio de Janeiro
- Dates: 16–25 July
- Teams: 8 (from 1 confederation)
- Venue: Círculo Militar Deodoro

Final positions
- Champions: Canada (4th title)
- Runner-up: Argentina
- Third place: Chile

Tournament statistics
- Matches played: 20
- Goals scored: 125 (6.25 per match)
- Top scorer: (Argentina) Jorge Lombi (10 goals)
- Best player: (Trinidad and Tobago) Kwandwane Browne

The men's field hockey tournament at the 2007 Pan American Games was held between 16 and 25 July 2007 in Rio de Janeiro, Brazil. The tournament doubled as the qualification to the 2008 Summer Olympics to be held in Beijing, China.

Canada won the tournament for the fourth time after defeating Argentina 5–4 in a penalty shoot-out after the final finished a 2–2 draw. Chile won the bronze medal after defeating Trinidad and Tobago 5–3 in the third place playoff.

== Qualification ==
Date	Event	Location	Quotas	Qualifier(s)
Host nation			1	Brazil
21–28 April 2004	2004 Pan American Cup	Bridgetown, Barbados	2	Canada; Netherlands Antilles
20–29 July 2006	2006 Central American and Caribbean Games	Santo Domingo, Dominican Republic	2	Cuba; Trinidad and Tobago
9–19 November 2006	2006 South American Games	Buenos Aires, Argentina	2	Argentina; Chile
8–11 March 2007	Qualification Event	Hamilton, Bermuda	1	United States
Total			8	

== Umpires ==
Below are the 10 umpires appointed by the Pan American Hockey Federation:

- Saleem Aaron (USA)
- Murray Grime (AUS)
- Daniel Lopez Ramos (URU)
- Albert Marcano (TTO)
- Germán Montes de Oca (ARG)
- Raúl Peña Vila (CUB)
- Sumseh Putra (CAN)
- Amarjit Singh (MAS)
- Constantine Soteriades (USA)
- Diego Wenz Küpfer (CHL)

== Results ==
=== Preliminary round ===
==== Pool A ====
Pos	Team	Pld	W	D	L	GF	GA	GD	Pts	Qualification
1	Argentina	3	3	0	0	30	1	+29	9	Semi-finals
2	Trinidad and Tobago	3	2	0	1	11	9	+2	6	Semi-finals
3	Cuba	3	1	0	2	10	6	+4	3	5th–8th place classification
4	Brazil (H)	3	0	0	3	1	36	−35	0	5th–8th place classification

Source: PAHF
(H) Hosts

16 July 2007
09:00

Trinidad and Tobago	2–1	Cuba
Browne 54'; Whittington 65'	Report	Blanco Hernandez 47'

Umpires:
Murray Grime (AUS)
Sumesh Putra (CAN)

16 July 2007
11:00

Argentina	19–0	Brazil
R. Vila 3'; Lombi 16', 24', 41', 66'; Almada 17', 36', 49', 70'; T. Argento 22', 56'; Paredes 29'; L. Vila 33', 61'; Gilardi 35', 60'; L. Argento 57'; Rossi 58', 68'	Report

Umpires:
Diego Wenz Küpfer (CHL)
Constantine Soteriades (USA)

18 July 2007
15:00

Argentina	4–0	Cuba
R. Vila 11'; Ibarra 48', 61'; Rey 63'	Report

Umpires:
Constantine Soteriades (USA)
Sumesh Putra (CAN)

18 July 2007
17:00

Brazil	1–8	Trinidad and Tobago
Alba 20'	Report	Browne 14', 32', 40'; Legerton 43', 63', 68', 70'; Gilkes 57'

Umpires:
Saleem Aaron (USA)
Amarjit Singh (MAS)

20 July 2007
09:00

Cuba	9–0	Brazil
Blanco Hernandez 4'; Sayas Gonzalez 18', 50', 55', 67'; Lemus Dominguez 32', 47', 69'; Iglesias Gomez 70'	Report

Umpires:
Sumesh Putra (CAN)
Albert Marcano (TRI)

20 July 2007
11:00

Argentina	7–1	Trinidad and Tobago
Lombi 32', 50', 54'; T. Argento 43'; Rossi 46'; Paredes 58'; L. Vila 69'	Report	Whittington 44'

Umpires:
Saleem Aaron (USA)
Diego Wenz Küpfer (CHL)

==== Pool B ====
Pos	Team	Pld	W	D	L	GF	GA	GD	Pts	Qualification
1	Canada	3	2	1	0	6	2	+4	7	Semi-finals
2	Chile	3	2	0	1	4	4	0	6	Semi-finals
3	Netherlands Antilles	3	1	0	2	3	5	−2	3	5th–8th place classification
4	United States	3	0	1	2	4	6	−2	1	5th–8th place classification

Source: PAHF

16 July 2007
15:00

Chile	2–1	United States
Kuhlenthal 18'; Koppenberger 37'	Report	P. Harris 9'

Umpires:
Amarjit Singh (MAS)
Raúl Peña Vila (CUB)

16 July 2007
17:00

Canada	2–0	Netherlands Antilles
Grimes 22', 68'	Report

Umpires:
Germán Montes de Oca (ARG)
Albert Marcano (TRI)

18 July 2007
09:00

Canada	2–2	United States
Fernandes 21', 53'	Report	Martin 33'; P. Harris 59'

Umpires:
Germán Montes de Oca (ARG)
Daniel Lopez Ramos (URU)

18 July 2007
11:00

Netherlands Antilles	1–2	Chile
Hop 57'	Report	Montegu 4'; Rodriguez 64'

Umpires:
Albert Marcano (TRI)
Murray Grime (AUS)

20 July 2007
15:00

United States	1–2	Netherlands Antilles
Ginolfi 7'	Report	Hardeman 3'; Elsenaar 64'

Umpires:
Raúl Peña Vila (CUB)
Daniel Lopez Ramos (URU)

20 July 2007
17:00

Canada	2–0	Chile
Grimes 19'; Short 50'	Report

Umpires:
Murray Grime (AUS)
Amarjit Singh (MAS)

=== Fifth to eighth place classification ===
Cross-overs
22 July
Cuba	4
United States	1
22 July
Netherlands Antilles	8
Brazil	0

Fifth place
25 July
United States	13
Brazil	0
Seventh place
25 July
Netherlands Antilles	1
Cuba	3

==== Cross-overs ====
22 July 2007
09:00

Cuba	4–1	United States
Blanco Hernandez 4'; Lemus Dominguez 10'; Aguilera Molina 31'; Sarduy Gomez 67'	Report	P. Harris 40'

Umpires:
Albert Marcano (TRI)
Diego Wenz Küpfer (CHL)

22 July 2007
11:30

Netherlands Antilles	8–0	Brazil
Elsenaar 6'; Hop 16', 66'; Pereira 31'; Van de Braak 44'; Christiaans 46'; Hardeman 53'; Braaksma 59'	Report

Umpires:
Saleem Aaron (USA)
Daniel Lopez Ramos (URU)

==== Seventh and eighth place ====
25 July 2007
09:00

United States	13–0	Brazil
Cota 3'; Martin 6', 7'; Couwenbergh 14'; P. Harris 17', 30', 33', 34', 58'; Ginolfi 20'; Hoang 52'; Cunningham 53'; S. Harris 66'	Report

Umpires:
Raúl Peña Vila (CUB)
Germán Montes de Oca (ARG)

==== Fifth and sixth place ====
25 July 2007
11:30

Netherlands Antilles	1–3	Cuba
Hardeman 24'	Report	Blanco Hernandez 60'; Lemus Dominguez 64', 69'

Umpires:
Sumesh Putra (CAN)
Amarjit Singh (MAS)

=== Medal round ===
Semi-finals
22 July
Argentina	5
Chile	2
22 July
Canada (a.e.t.)	4
Trinidad and Tobago	3

Gold-medal match
25 July
Argentina	2 (4)
Canada (p.s.o)	2 (5)
Bronze-medal match
25 July
Chile	5
Trinidad and Tobago	3

==== Semi-finals ====
22 July 2007
14:30

Argentina	5–2	Chile
Lombi 3', 47'; R. Vila 29'; Rey 66'; Almada 68'	Report	Montegu 43'; Kuhlenthal 52'

Umpires:
Sumesh Putra (CAN)
Gus Soteriades (USA)

22 July 2007
17:00

Canada	4–3 (a.e.t.)	Trinidad and Tobago
Singh 18'; Fernandes 37', 82'; Deol 51'	Report	Legerton 7', 10', 55'

Umpires:
Murray Grime (AUS)
German Montes (ARG)

==== Bronze-medal match ====
25 July 2007
14:30

Chile	5–3	Trinidad and Tobago
Kapsch 18', 27', 70'; Montegu 33'; Kannegiesser 55'	Report	Quan Chan 30', 36'; Toussaint 51'

Umpires:
Gus Soteriades (USA)
Saleem Aaron (USA)

==== Gold-medal match ====
25 July 2007
17:00

Argentina	2–2 (a.e.t.)	Canada
R. Vila 19'; Lombi 54'	Report	Fernandes 41'; Grimes 57'
Penalties
Lombi (penalty shoot-out scored); Gilardi (penalty shoot-out scored); Almada (penalty shoot-out missed); L. Vila (penalty shoot-out scored); Paredes (penalty shoot-out scored); Lombi (penalty shoot-out missed)	4–5	(penalty shoot-out scored) Fernandes; (penalty shoot-out scored) Grimes; (penalty shoot-out missed) Tupper; (penalty shoot-out scored) Wettlaufer; (penalty shoot-out scored) R. Short; (penalty shoot-out scored) Fernandes

Umpires:
Murray Grime (AUS)
Daniel Lopez Ramos (URU)

== Final standings ==
Rank	Team
Gold medal	Canada
Silver medal	Argentina
Bronze medal	Chile
4	Trinidad and Tobago
5	Cuba
6	Netherlands Antilles
7	United States
8	Brazil

Qualified for the 2008 Summer Olympics

== Medalists ==
Event	Gold	Silver	Bronze
Men	Canada; Ranjeev Deol; Wayne Fernandes; Connor Grimes; David Jameson; Ranvinder Kahlon; Michael Mahood; Matthew Peck; Ken Pereira; Scott Sandison; Marian Schole; Peter Short; Rob Short; Sukhwinder Singh; Scott Tupper; Paul Wettlaufer; Anthony Wright	Argentina; Mario Almada; Lucas Argento Innocente; Tomás Argento Innocente; Ignacio Bergner; Mariano Chao; Juan Ignacio Gilardi; Pedro Ibarra; Jorge Lombi; Matías Paredes; Lucas Rey; Matías Rey; Lucas Rossi; Lucas Vila; Rodrigo Vila; Juan Manuel Vivaldi; Fernando Zylberberg	Chile; Matias Amoroso; Mathias Anwandter; Felipe Casanova; Thomas Kannegeisser; Sebastian Kapsch; Ian Koppenberger; Esteban Krainz; Pablo Kuhlenthal; Luis Felipe Montegu; Cristobal Rodriguez; Mauro Scaff; Martín Sotomayor; Alan Stien; Alfredo Thiermann; Gabriel Thiermann; Matias Vogel
