= Guyana men's national field hockey team =

Guyana
- Association: Guyana Hockey Board
- Confederation: PAHF (Americas)

FIH ranking
- Current: 84 ▲1 (19 December 2025)
- Highest: 52 (July 2018 – December 2018)
- Lowest: 90 (July 2023 – present)

Pan American Games
- Appearances: 3 (first in 1971)
- Best result: 7th (1975)

The Guyana men's national field hockey team represents Guyana in men's international field hockey competitions. The team is controlled by the Guyana Hockey Board, the governing body for field hockey in Guyana.

== Tournament record ==
=== Pan American Games ===
- 1971 – 8th place
- 1975 – 7th place
- 1991 – 10th place

=== Central American and Caribbean Games ===
- 1993 – 5th place
- 2018 – 4th place
- 2023 – 7th place

=== Pan American Challenge ===
- 2015 – 4th place

=== Alba Games ===
- 2007 – (silver)

== See also ==
- Guyana women's national field hockey team
