= Pedro Barra =

Chilean footballer

Personal information
- Full name: Pedro Barra García
- Place of birth: Chile
- Position: Forward

Senior career*
Years	Team	Apps	(Gls)
–1933	Germania FV		
1933–1934	América		

Managerial career
- 1936–1937: América
- * Club domestic league appearances and goals

Pedro Barra García was a Chilean football manager and player who played as a forward.

== Career ==
A footballer from Chile, he played in Mexico for Germania FV and América (1933–34).

He was the first Chilean to play for América before players such as Osvaldo Castro, Roberto Hodge, Reinaldo Navia, Iván Zamorano, among others.

He also coached América in the 1936–37 season, reaching 40.91 percent of performance with eleven matches.

== Personal life ==
Due to his origin, he was known as El Chileno (The Chilean) in Mexican football.

== Legacy ==
In the 1930s, he served as representative of América at Liga Mayor and was the driving force behind the "night football" in Mexico, since matches were played during the day at that time. The first match played at night faced Atlante and España on 28 March 1940 for the 1939–40 Copa México.
