= Argentina men's national field hockey team =

Men's national field hockey team representing Argentina

Argentina
- Nickname(s): Los Leones (The Lions)
- Association: Confederación Argentina de Hockey (CAH)
- Confederation: PAHF (Americas)
- Head Coach: Lucas Rey
- Assistant coach(es): Lucas Cammareri; Daniel García
- Manager: Pablo González
- Captain: Maico Casella; Matías Rey
- Most caps: Matías Paredes (356)
- Top scorer: Jorge Lombi (341)
| Home | Away |

FIH ranking
- Current: 4 (4 October 2026)
- Highest: 1 (April 2017 – October 2017)
- Lowest: 14 (2009)

Olympic Games
- Appearances: 13 (first in 1948)
- Best result: (gold) 1st (2016)

World Cup
- Appearances: 15 (first in 1971)
- Best result: (bronze) 3rd (2014, 2026)

Pan American Games
- Appearances: 15 (first in 1967)
- Best result: 1st (1967, 1971, 1975, 1979, 1991, 1995, 2003, 2011, 2015, 2019, 2023)

Pan American Cup
- Appearances: 7 (first in 2000)
- Best result: 1st (2004, 2013, 2017, 2022, 2025)
Medal record
Olympic Games
| Gold medal – first place | 2016 Rio de Janeiro | Team |
World Cup
| Bronze medal – third place | 2014 The Hague |
| Bronze medal – third place | 2026 Wavre–Amstelveen |
Pan American Games
| Gold medal – first place | 1967 Winnipeg | Team |
| Gold medal – first place | 1971 Cali | Team |
| Gold medal – first place | 1975 Mexico City | Team |
| Gold medal – first place | 1979 San Juan | Team |
| Gold medal – first place | 1991 Havana | Team |
| Gold medal – first place | 1995 Mar del Plata | Team |
| Gold medal – first place | 2003 Santo Domingo | Team |
| Gold medal – first place | 2011 Guadalajara | Team |
| Gold medal – first place | 2015 Toronto | Team |
| Gold medal – first place | 2019 Lima | Team |
| Gold medal – first place | 2023 Santiago | Team |
| Silver medal – second place | 1983 Caracas | Team |
| Silver medal – second place | 1987 Indianapolis | Team |
| Silver medal – second place | 1999 Winnipeg | Team |
| Silver medal – second place | 2007 Rio de Janeiro | Team |
Pan American Cup
| Gold medal – first place | 2004 London |
| Gold medal – first place | 2013 Brampton |
| Gold medal – first place | 2017 Lancaster |
| Gold medal – first place | 2022 Santiago |
| Gold medal – first place | 2025 Montevideo |
| Bronze medal – third place | 2000 Havana |
| Bronze medal – third place | 2009 Santiago |
Champions Trophy
| Bronze medal – third place | 2008 Rotterdam |
Champions Challenge
| Gold medal – first place | 2005 Alexandria |
| Gold medal – first place | 2007 Boom |
| Gold medal – first place | 2012 Quilmes |
| Bronze medal – third place | 2001 Kuala Lumpur |
Hockey World League
| Silver medal – second place | 2016–17 Bhubaneswar | Team |
South American Games
| Gold medal – first place | 2006 Buenos Aires | Team |
| Gold medal – first place | 2014 Santiago | Team |
| Gold medal – first place | 2018 Cochabamba | Team |
| Gold medal – first place | 2022 Asunción | Team |
South American Championship
| Gold medal – first place | 2003 Santiago |
| Gold medal – first place | 2008 Montevideo |
| Gold medal – first place | 2010 Rio de Janeiro |
| Gold medal – first place | 2013 Santiago |

The Argentina men's national field hockey team (Spanish: Selección masculina de hockey sobre césped de Argentina) represents Argentina in field hockey and is governed by the Argentine Hockey Confederation (CAH). The current coach is Lucas Rey, who was appointed after Mariano Ronconi let go after the 2024 Summer Olympics. The team is currently fourth in the FIH World Rankings.

Los Leones (The Lions) are the only team of the Americas to win a gold medal at the Olympic Games. They achieved this after defeating Belgium 4–2 in the final at the 2016 Summer Olympics in Rio de Janeiro, Brazil. Argentina's Olympic gold-winning coach is Carlos Retegui.

Argentina has appeared in every Hockey World Cup, since the first edition in 1973, except the 1998 edition. They won the bronze medal in 2014, their best position in the tournament. They also obtained a bronze medal at the 2008 Hockey Champions Trophy and a silver medal at the 2016–17 Hockey World League.

At a continental level, Argentina is the most winning team in the Americas, having dominated most tournaments they played, including four gold medals at the Pan American Cup and eleven gold medals at the Pan American Games.

In November 2015 Argentina reached a historic 5th place in the FIH World Rankings, only to be surpassed after their Olympic gold medal by reaching 1st place in April 2017.

== History ==
The team won the bronze medal at the 2014 World Cup, being ranked 11th in the FIH World Rankings. They also won the bronze medal at the 2008 Champions Trophy, during Carlos Retegui's first period as a coach.

In 2013, during the Hockey World League Semifinals in Johor Bahru, Malaysia, the team along with coach Carlos Retegui decide to name themselves Los Leones (The Lions), matching the nickname chosen by the women's team at the 2000 Summer Olympics in Sydney, Australia.

Argentina didn't have great performances at the Summer Olympics until they won the gold medal at the 2016 edition by defeating Belgium 4–2, when they became the first national hockey team to win that prize for their country.

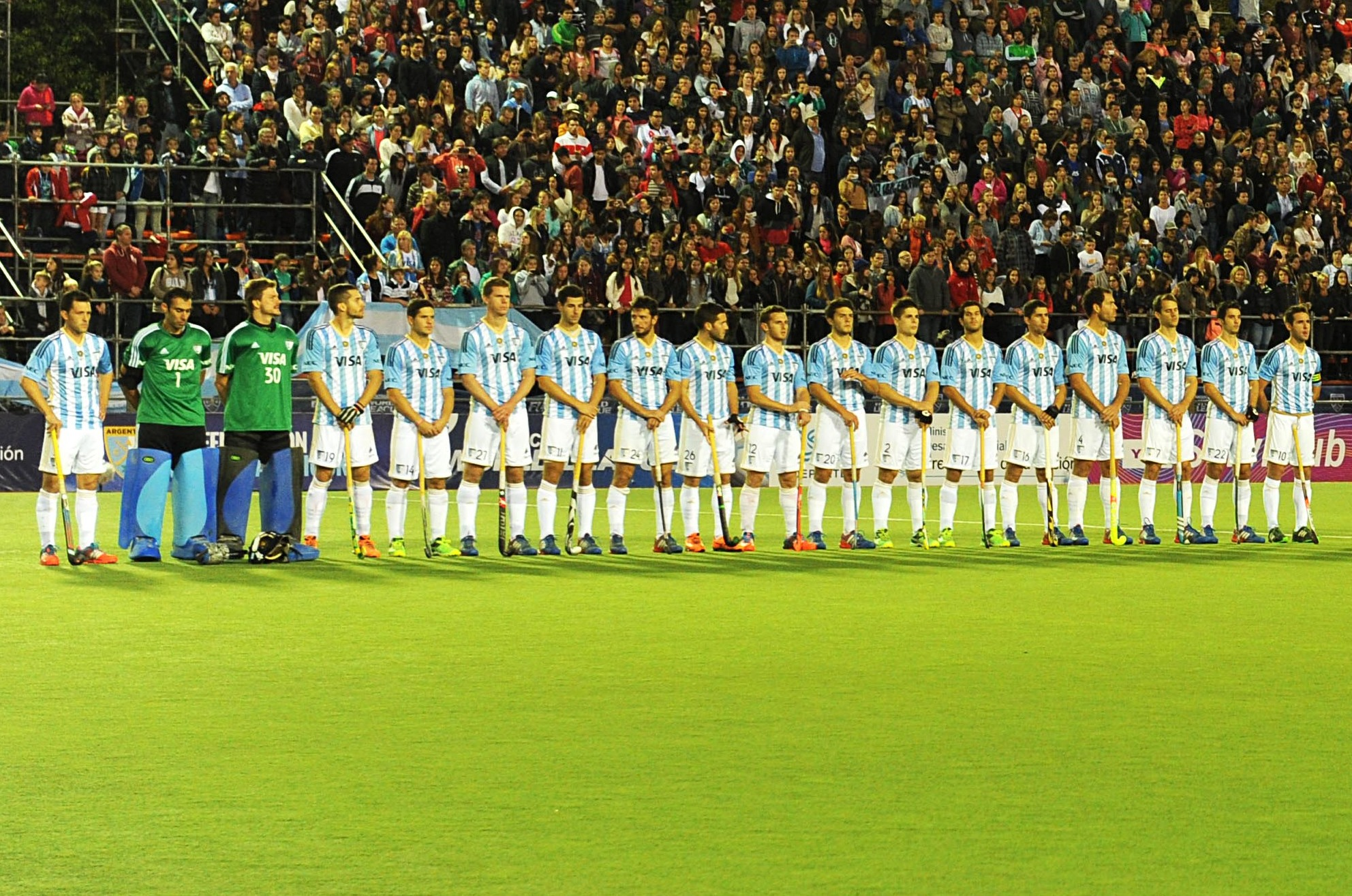
Los Leones in 2015.

== Competitive record ==
=== Summer Olympics ===
Summer Olympics record
| Year | Host | Position | Pld | W | D | L | GF | GA | Squad |
|---|---|---|---|---|---|---|---|---|---|
| 1908 to 1936 | | did not participate | | | | | | | |
| 1948 | (United Kingdom) London, Great Britain | 5th | 3 | 1 | 1 | 1 | 5 | 12 | Squad |
| 1952 to 1964 | | did not participate | | | | | | | |
| 1968 | Mexico City, Mexico | 14th | 8 | 1 | 1 | 6 | 4 | 22 | Squad |
| 1972 | Munich, West Germany | 14th | 8 | 0 | 3 | 5 | 4 | 10 | Squad |
| 1976 | Montreal, Canada | 11th | 6 | 1 | 0 | 5 | 6 | 15 | Squad |
| 1980 | Moscow, Soviet Union | Withdrew | | | | | | | |
| 1984 | Los Angeles, United States | did not participate | | | | | | | |
| 1988 | Seoul, South Korea | 8th | 7 | 2 | 1 | 4 | 15 | 22 | Squad |
| 1992 | Barcelona, Spain | 11th | 7 | 2 | 0 | 5 | 14 | 20 | Squad |
| 1996 | Atlanta, United States | 9th | 7 | 3 | 1 | 3 | 16 | 19 | Squad |
| 2000 | Sydney, Australia | 8th | 7 | 1 | 2 | 4 | 16 | 22 | Squad |
| 2004 | Athens, Greece | 11th | 7 | 1 | 2 | 4 | 13 | 19 | Squad |
| 2008 | Beijing, China | did not qualify | | | | | | | |
| 2012 | (United Kingdom) London, Great Britain | 10th | 6 | 1 | 1 | 4 | 11 | 17 | Squad |
| 2016 | Rio de Janeiro, Brazil | 1st | 8 | 5 | 2 | 1 | 25 | 17 | Squad |
| 2020 | Tokyo, Japan | 7th | 6 | 2 | 1 | 3 | 11 | 14 | Squad |
| 2024 | Paris, France | 8th | 6 | 2 | 2 | 2 | 10 | 9 | Squad |
| 2028 | Los Angeles, United States | to be determined | | | | | | | |
| 2032 | Brisbane, Australia | to be determined | | | | | | | |
| Total | | 1st place | 86 | 22 | 17 | 47 | 150 | 218 | |

=== World Cup ===
Men's FIH Hockey World Cup record
| Year | Host | Position | Pld | W | D | L | GF | GA | Squad |
|---|---|---|---|---|---|---|---|---|---|
| 1971 | Barcelona, Spain | 10th | 5 | 0 | 0 | 5 | 1 | 11 | —N/a |
| 1973 | Amstelveen, Netherlands | 9th | 7 | 2 | 3 | 2 | 5 | 9 | —N/a |
| 1975 | Kuala Lumpur, Malaysia | 11th | 7 | 3 | 1 | 3 | 15 | 17 | —N/a |
| 1978 | Buenos Aires, Argentina | 8th | 8 | 2 | 2 | 4 | 12 | 18 | —N/a |
| 1982 | Mumbai, India | 12th | 7 | 1 | 0 | 6 | 9 | 21 | —N/a |
| 1986 | London, England | 6th | 7 | 2 | 1 | 4 | 8 | 10 | —N/a |
| 1990 | Lahore, Pakistan | 9th | 7 | 3 | 1 | 3 | 15 | 15 | —N/a |
| 1994 | Sydney, Australia | 7th | 7 | 2 | 3 | 2 | 13 | 13 | —N/a |
| 1998 | Utrecht, Netherlands | did not qualify | | | | | | | |
| 2002 | Kuala Lumpur, Malaysia | 6th | 9 | 6 | 0 | 3 | 23 | 18 | Squad |
| 2006 | Mönchengladbach, Germany | 10th | 7 | 2 | 1 | 4 | 9 | 16 | Squad |
| 2010 | New Delhi, India | 7th | 6 | 3 | 0 | 3 | 13 | 13 | Squad |
| 2014 | The Hague, Netherlands | 3rd | 7 | 5 | 0 | 2 | 18 | 10 | Squad |
| 2018 | Bhubaneswar, India | 7th | 4 | 2 | 0 | 2 | 12 | 11 | Squad |
| 2023 | Odisha, India | 9th | 6 | 3 | 3 | 0 | 28 | 13 | Squad |
| 2026 | Wavre, Belgium; Amstelveen, Netherlands | 3rd | 7 | 5 | 0 | 2 | 22 | 11 | Squad |
| Total | | 3rd place | 101 | 41 | 15 | 45 | 203 | 206 | |

=== Pan American Championships ===
==== Pan American Games ====
Pan American Games record
| Year | Position |
|---|---|
| (Canada) 1967 | 1st |
| (Colombia) 1971 | 1st |
| (Mexico) 1975 | 1st |
| (Puerto Rico) 1979 | 1st |
| (Venezuela) 1983 | 2nd |
| (United States) 1987 | 2nd |
| (Cuba) 1991 | 1st |
| (Argentina) 1995 | 1st |
| (Canada) 1999 | 2nd |
| (Dominican Republic) 2003 | 1st |
| (Brazil) 2007 | 2nd |
| (Mexico) 2011 | 1st |
| (Canada) 2015 | 1st |
| (Peru) 2019 | 1st |
| (Chile) 2023 | 1st |
| (Peru) 2027 | Qualified |
Best result: 1st place

==== Pan American Cup ====
Pan American Cup record
| Year | Host | Position | Pld | W | D | L | GF | GA |
|---|---|---|---|---|---|---|---|---|
| 2000 | Havana, Cuba | 3rd | 7 | 5 | 1 | 1 | 68 | 5 |
| 2004 | London, Canada | 1st | 7 | 7 | 0 | 0 | 68 | 3 |
| 2009 | Santiago, Chile | 3rd | 5 | 4 | 0 | 1 | 40 | 4 |
| 2013 | Brampton, Canada | 1st | 5 | 5 | 0 | 0 | 62 | 2 |
| 2017 | Lancaster, United States | 1st | 5 | 5 | 0 | 0 | 37 | 3 |
| 2022 | Santiago, Chile | 1st | 4 | 4 | 0 | 0 | 23 | 5 |
| 2025 | Montevideo, Uruguay | 1st | 5 | 5 | 0 | 0 | 47 | 1 |
| Total | | 1st place | 38 | 31 | 1 | 2 | 345 | 23 |

=== South American Championships ===
==== South American Games ====
South American Games record
| Year | Host | Position | Pld | W | D | L | GF | GA |
|---|---|---|---|---|---|---|---|---|
| 2006 | Buenos Aires, Argentina | 1st | 5 | 4 | 1 | 0 | 37 | 0 |
| 2014 | Santiago, Chile | 1st | 6 | 6 | 0 | 0 | 66 | 8 |
| 2018 | Cochabamba, Bolivia | 1st | 5 | 5 | 0 | 0 | 26 | 2 |
| 2022 | Asunción, Paraguay | 1st | 4 | 4 | 0 | 0 | 49 | 1 |
| 2026 | Santa Fe, Argentina | 1st | 5 | 5 | 0 | 0 | 41 | 3 |
| Total | | 1st place | 25 | 24 | 1 | 0 | 219 | 14 |

==== South American Championship ====
South American Championship
| Year | Position | Pld | W | D | L | GF | GA |
|---|---|---|---|---|---|---|---|
| (Chile) 2003 | 1st | 5 | 5 | 0 | 0 | 71 | 4 |
| (Uruguay) 2008 | 1st | 6 | 6 | 0 | 0 | 41 | 1 |
| (Brazil) 2010 | 1st | 6 | 6 | 0 | 0 | 54 | 1 |
| (Chile) 2013 | 1st | 6 | 6 | 0 | 0 | 69 | 5 |
| (Peru) 2016 | did not participate | | | | | | |
| Total | 4 titles | 23 | 23 | 0 | 0 | 235 | 11 |

=== FIH Pro League ===
FIH Pro League record
| Season | Position | Pld | W | D * | L | GF | GA | Squad |
|---|---|---|---|---|---|---|---|---|
| 2019 | 5th | 14 | 6 | 3 | 5 | 41 | 36 | Squad |
| 2020–21 | 7th | 12 | 2 | 4 | 6 | 26 | 35 | Squad |
| 2021–22 | 5th | 16 | 6 | 4 | 6 | 31 | 35 | Squad |
| 2022–23 | 8th | 16 | 3 | 6 | 7 | 28 | 36 | Squad |
| 2023–24 | 4th | 16 | 7 | 5 | 4 | 39 | 35 | Squad |
| 2024–25 | 6th | 16 | 7 | 2 | 7 | 28 | 32 | Squad |
| 2025–26 | 5th | 16 | 6 | 4 | 6 | 45 | 41 | Squad |
| Total | Best: 4th | 106 | 37 | 28 | 41 | 238 | 250 | |

=== Sultan Azlan Shah Cup ===
Sultan Azlan Shah Cup record
| Year | Position |
|---|---|
| 2006 | 7th |
| 2007 | 5th |
| 2008 | 1st |
| 2012 | 2nd |
| 2018 | 3rd |
Best result: 1st place

=== Defunct competitions ===
==== Champions Trophy ====
Champions Trophy record
| Year | Position | Pld | W | D * | L | GF | GA |
|---|---|---|---|---|---|---|---|
| (Pakistan) 1978 until (Pakistan) 1986 | did not participate | | | | | | |
| (Netherlands) 1987 | 6th | 7 | 2 | 2 | 3 | 6 | 15 |
| (Pakistan) 1988 until (Germany) 2002 | did not participate | | | | | | |
| (Netherlands) 2003 | 5th | 6 | 3 | 0 | 3 | 20 | 24 |
| (Pakistan) 2004 | did not participate | | | | | | |
| (India) 2005 | did not participate | | | | | | |
| (Spain) 2006 | 6th | 6 | 0 | 1 | 5 | 6 | 19 |
| (Malaysia) 2007 | did not participate | | | | | | |
| (Netherlands) 2008 | 3rd | 6 | 3 | 2 | 1 | 12 | 9 |
| (Australia) 2009 until (Australia) 2012 | did not participate | | | | | | |
| (India) 2014 | 6th | 6 | 3 | 0 | 3 | 12 | 14 |
| (United Kingdom) 2016 | did not participate | | | | | | |
| (Netherlands) 2018 | 4th | 6 | 2 | 1 | 3 | 8 | 12 |
| Total | 3rd | 37 | 13 | 6 | 18 | 64 | 93 |

==== Champions Challenge I ====
Champions Challenge I record
| Year | Position | Pld | W | D * | L | GF | GA |
|---|---|---|---|---|---|---|---|
| (Malaysia) 2001 | 3rd | 6 | 4 | 0 | 2 | 14 | 10 |
| (South Africa) 2003 | did not participate | | | | | | |
| (Egypt) 2005 | 1st | 6 | 4 | 2 | 0 | 25 | 13 |
| (Belgium) 2007 | 1st | 6 | 4 | 1 | 1 | 16 | 12 |
| (Argentina) 2009 | 4th | 5 | 2 | 0 | 3 | 15 | 12 |
| (South Africa) 2011 | 4th | 6 | 3 | 2 | 1 | 18 | 12 |
| (Argentina) 2012 | 1st | 6 | 6 | 0 | 0 | 22 | 7 |
| (Malaysia) 2014 | did not participate | | | | | | |
| Total | 3 titles | 35 | 23 | 5 | 7 | 110 | 66 |

==== Hockey World League ====
Hockey World League record
| Season | Position | Round | Pld | W | D * | L | GF | GA |
|---|---|---|---|---|---|---|---|---|
| 2012–13 | 8th | Round 2 | 5 | 5 | 0 | 0 | 38 | 4 |
| 2012–13 | 8th | Semifinal | 6 | 4 | 1 | 1 | 18 | 7 |
| 2012–13 | 8th | Final | 6 | 2 | 2 | 2 | 12 | 14 |
| 2014–15 | 5th | Semifinal | 7 | 6 | 0 | 1 | 16 | 9 |
| 2014–15 | 5th | Final | 5 | 3 | 0 | 2 | 13 | 8 |
| 2016–17 | 2nd | Semifinal | 7 | 5 | 1 | 1 | 26 | 14 |
| 2016–17 | 2nd | Final | 6 | 2 | 1 | 3 | 11 | 12 |
| Total | 2nd | Final | 42 | 27 | 5 | 10 | 134 | 68 |

*Draws include matches decided on a penalty shoot-out.

== Players ==
=== Current squad ===
Roster for the 2026 Men's FIH Hockey World Cup.

Head coach: Lucas Rey

1. Tomás Santiago (GK)
5. Facundo Zárate
7. Nicolás Keenan
9. Maico Casella (C)
10. Nicolás Della Torre
11. Lucas Toscani
12. Nehuen Hernando (GK)
15. Tomás Ruiz
16. Joaquín Toscani
20. Matías Andreotti
21. Tomás Domene
22. Matías Rey (C)
23. Lucas Martínez
26. Nicolás Cicileo
27. Tadeo Marcucci
28. Ignacio Ibarra
29. Thomas Habif
31. Bautista Capurro
32. Martín Ferreiro
33. Lucio Méndez

=== Past players ===
- Mario Almada
- Manuel Brunet
- Maximiliano Caldas
- Facundo Callioni
- Lucas Cammareri
- Matías Cammareri
- Agustín Corradini
- Fernando Falchetto
- Fernando Ferrara
- Marcelo Garraffo
- Juan Ignacio Gilardi
- Juan Pablo Hourquebie
- Isidoro Ibarra
- Pedro Ibarra
- Jorge Lombi
- Juan Martín López
- Luca Masso
- Joaquín Menini
- Pablo Moreira
- Gabriel Minadeo
- Ignacio Ortiz
- Matías Paredes
- Gonzalo Peillat
- Carlos Retegui
- Lucas Rey
- Lucas Rossi
- Juan Manuel Saladino
- Sergio Vigil
- Lucas Vila
- Matías Vila
- Rodrigo Vila
- Juan Manuel Vivaldi
- Fernando Zylberberg

=== Captains ===
| Period | Captain |
|---|---|
| 2000–2004 | Pablo Moreira |
| 2005–2006 | Germán Orozco |
| 2007–2008 | Mario Almada |
| 2008–2013 | Matías Vila |
| 2013–2014 | Lucas Rey |
| 2014–2015 | Matías Paredes |
| 2015–2021 | Pedro Ibarra |
| 2021–Present | Maico Casella; Agustín Mazzilli; Matías Rey |

=== Coaches ===
| Period | Name |
|---|---|
| ???–1983 | Juan Carlos Duré |
| 1983–1990 | Luis Ciancia |
| 1991–1992 | Jorge Ruiz |
| 1993–1996 | Miguel MacCormik |
| 1996–1999 | Marcelo Garraffo |
| 1999–2000 | Alejandro Verga |
| 2000–2005 | Jorge Ruíz |
| 2005–2008 | Sergio Vigil |
| 2008–2009 | Carlos Retegui |
| 2009–2012 | Pablo Lombi |
| 2012–2013 | Franco Nicola |
| 2013–2018 | Carlos Retegui (2nd cycle) |
| 2018–2020 | Germán Orozco |
| 2020–2021 | Mariano Ronconi |
| 2021 | Carlos Retegui (3rd cycle) |
| 2021–2024 | Mariano Ronconi (2nd cycle) |
| 2024–Present | Lucas Rey |

== Results and fixtures ==
The following is a list of match results in the last 12 months, as well as any future matches that have been scheduled.

Win Draw Loss Fixture

=== 2026 ===
| 10 February 2026 2025–26 Men's FIH Pro League | Belgium | 5–3 | Argentina | Rourkela, India |
| 19:30 | Boon 15', 30', 58'; Hellin 32'; Hendrickx 53' | Report | Domene 2', 24'; Della Torre 9' | Stadium: Birsa Munda International Hockey Stadium |

| 12 February 2026 2025–26 Men's FIH Pro League | India | 0–8 | Argentina | Rourkela, India |
| 19:30 | | Report | Ruiz 14'; Domene 15', 20', 26', 60'; Mendez 22'; Ibarra 25' della Torre 30' | Stadium: Birsa Munda International Hockey Stadium |

| 13 February 2026 2025–26 Men's FIH Pro League | Argentina | 2–5 | Belgium | Rourkela, India |
| 19:30 | Domene 19'; Rey 45' | Report | Sloover 36'; Biekens 39'; Hendrickx 49', 54'; Duvekot 55' | Stadium: Birsa Munda International Hockey Stadium |

| 15 February 2026 2025–26 Men's FIH Pro League | India | 2–4 | Argentina | Rourkela, India |
| 19:30 | Aditya 50'; Sanjay 59' | Report | Domene 18'; Marcucci 28', 49'; Mendez 43' | Stadium: Birsa Munda International Hockey Stadium |

| 13 June 2026 2025–26 Men's FIH Pro League | England | 5–0 | Argentina | London, England |
| 12:30 | Croft 18', 51'; Ward 41'; Bandurak 47'; Sorsby 58' | Report | | Stadium: Lee Valley Hockey and Tennis Centre |

| 17 June 2026 2025–26 Men's FIH Pro League | Australia | 1–2 | Argentina | London, England |
| 17:00 | Willott 29' | Report | Domene 40', 57' | Stadium: Lee Valley Hockey and Tennis Centre |

| 18 June 2026 2025–26 Men's FIH Pro League | Argentina | 2–3 | Australia | London, England |
| 17:00 | T. Domene 2'; L. Domene 6' | Report | Ephraums 26', 59'; Craig 50' | Stadium: Lee Valley Hockey and Tennis Centre |

| 20 June 2026 2025–26 Men's FIH Pro League | England | 1–1 (3–1 p) | Argentina | London, England |
| 12:30 | Bandurak 45' | Report | Domene 50' | Stadium: Lee Valley Hockey and Tennis Centre |
| | Penalties |
| | Calnan (penalty shoot-out scored); Albery (penalty shoot-out scored); Rushmere (penalty shoot-out scored) | | (penalty shoot-out scored) Mendez; (penalty shoot-out missed) Domene; (penalty shoot-out missed) Toscani; (penalty shoot-out missed) Martins |

| 23 June 2026 2025–26 Men's FIH Pro League | Argentina | 2–3 | Spain | Berlin, Germany |
| 17:30 | T. Domene 7'; Della Torre 46' | Report | Basterra 22'; Recasens 27'; Cunill 33' | Stadium: Ernst-Reuter Sportfeld |

| 24 June 2026 2025–26 Men's FIH Pro League | Germany | 2–1 | Argentina | Berlin, Germany |
| 20:30 | Weigand 26', 59' | Report | Ferreiro 45' | Stadium: Ernst-Reuter Sportfeld |

| 26 June 2026 2025–26 Men's FIH Pro League | Spain | 4–4 (1–3 p) | Argentina | Berlin, Germany |
| 17:30 | Basterra 24', 25'; Álvarez 34', 57' | Report | T. Domene 1', 39'; Della Torre 43'; Tarazona 58' | Stadium: Ernst-Reuter Sportfeld |
| | Penalties |
| | Gispert (penalty shoot-out missed); Bonastre (penalty shoot-out scored); Miralles (penalty shoot-out missed); Font (penalty shoot-out missed) | | (penalty shoot-out scored) Méndez; (penalty shoot-out missed) Ferreiro; (penalty shoot-out scored) T. Domene; (penalty shoot-out missed) T. Domene; (penalty shoot-out scored) Toscani |

| 27 June 2026 2025–26 Men's FIH Pro League | Germany | 4–4 (2–1 p) | Argentina | Berlin, Germany |
| 13:30 | Schwarzhaupt 11'; Brilla 13'; Weigand 55', 60' | Report | Della Torre 15'; T. Domene 28', 34'; Ferreiro 41' | Stadium: Ernst-Reuter Sportfeld |
| | Penalties |
| | Struthoff (penalty shoot-out missed); Weigand (penalty shoot-out scored); Hayner (penalty shoot-out scored); Prinz (penalty shoot-out missed) | | (penalty shoot-out scored) T. Domene; (penalty shoot-out missed) Ibarra; (penalty shoot-out missed) L. Toscani; (penalty shoot-out missed) Ferreiro; (penalty shoot-out missed) J. Toscani |

| 16 August 2026 2026 World Cup Pool A | Argentina | 3–0 | Japan | Amstelveen, Netherlands |
| 19:00 | Toscani 21'; Méndez 54'; Casella 58' | Report | | Stadium: Wagener Stadium |

| 18 August 2026 2026 World Cup Pool A | Argentina | 1–3 | Netherlands | Amstelveen, Netherlands |
| 18:00 | Della Torre 11' | Report | Brinkman 7'; Reyenga 34'; Telgenkamp 42' | Stadium: Wagener Stadium |

| 20 August 2026 2026 World Cup Pool A | New Zealand | 1–7 | Argentina | Amstelveen, Netherlands |
| 12:30 | Russell 13' | Report | Domene 22', 43', 60'; Capurro 39', 58'; Marcucci 48'; Keenan 52' | Stadium: Wagener Stadium |

| 22 August 2026 2026 World Cup Pool E | England | 1–3 | Argentina | Amstelveen, Netherlands |
| 19:00 | Hooper 50' | Report | Domene 26', 36', 58' | Stadium: Wagener Stadium |

| 24 August 2026 2026 World Cup Pool E | Argentina | 5–3 | India | Amstelveen, Netherlands |
| 14:45 | J. Toscani 1' della Torre 6'; Domene 33', 45'; L. Toscani 53' | Report | Sukhjeet 10', 58'; Hardik 60' | Stadium: Wagener Stadium |

| 28 August 2026 2026 World Cup Semi final | Germany | 2–1 | Argentina | Wavre, Belgium |
| 20:30 | Weigand 33'; Kaufmann 54' | Report | Domene 46' | Stadium: Belfius Hockey Arena |

| 30 August 2026 2026 World Cup Third place match | Netherlands | 1–2 | Argentina | Wavre, Belgium |
| 14:00 | Middendorp 49' | Report | Domene 41'; Rey 59' | Stadium: Belfius Hockey Arena |

| 14 September 2026 2026 ODESUR Pool A | Argentina | 22–0 | Peru | Santa Fe, Argentina |
| 12:00 | Agostini 4', 12', 15', 36', 45'; Kovalivker 11', 39'; Torrigiani 11', 26', 43', 51'; Tarazona 19', 31', 58'; Dulor 42'; Ruiz 44'; Serrano 45'; Costa 46', 47'; Rodriguez 54'; Habif 54'; Ferreiro 57' | Report | | Stadium: Estadio Asociacion Santafesina de Hockey |

| 16 September 2026 2026 ODESUR Pool A | Brazil | 1–4 | Argentina | Santa Fe, Argentina |
| 10:00 | Imer 26' | Report | Agostini 4', 13'; Kovalivker 17'; Fernandez 20' | Stadium: Estadio Asociacion Santafesina de Hockey |

| 18 September 2026 2026 ODESUR Pool A | Chile | 1–5 | Argentina | Santa Fe, Argentina |
| 14:00 | Amoroso 30+' | Report | Agostini 3'; Tarazona 13'; Costa 39'; Rodriguez 43'; Ferreiro 52' | Stadium: Estadio Asociacion Santafesina de Hockey |

| 20 September 2026 2026 ODESUR Pool A | Argentina | 7–0 | Uruguay | Santa Fe, Argentina |
| 12:00 | Rodriguez 7'; Serrano 13'; Costa 19', 40'; Torrigiani 46'; Dulor 53'; Cicileo 57' | Report | | Stadium: Estadio Asociacion Santafesina de Hockey |

| 22 September 2026 2026 ODESUR Gold medal match | Argentina | 3–1 | Chile | Santa Fe, Argentina |
| 13:30 | Tarazona 14'; Ferreiro 17'; Agostini 45' | Report | Contardo 52' | Stadium: Estadio Asociacion Santafesina de Hockey |
