= Field hockey at the 1983 Pan American Games =

- Start date: 15 August 1983
- End date: 26 August 1983
- Teams: 9

Medalists
Gold medal	Canada (1st title)
Silver medal	Argentina
Bronze medal	Chile

The field hockey tournament at the 1983 Pan American Games was the fifth edition of the field hockey event at the Pan American Games. It took place in Caracas, Venezuela from 15 to 26 August 1983.

Canada won their first gold medal by defeating the defending champions Argentina 3–1 in the final. Chile won the bronze medal by defeating the United States 1–0.

Event	Gold	Silver	Bronze
Men's field hockey	Canada	Argentina	Chile

== Results ==
=== Group stage ===
==== Group A ====
Pos	Team	Pld	W	D	L	GF	GA	GD	Pts	Qualification
1	Canada	4	4	0	0	19	3	+16	8	Semi-finals
2	United States	4	3	0	1	8	6	+2	6	Semi-finals
3	Cuba	4	1	1	2	6	9	−3	3	Fifth place game
4	Trinidad and Tobago	4	1	1	2	5	12	−7	3	Seventh place game
5	Barbados	4	0	0	4	3	11	−8	0	

Source: TheSports.org

15 August 1983

Trinidad and Tobago	2–1	Barbados

15 August 1983

Canada	3–0	United States

16 August 1983

Canada	4–0	Barbados

17 August 1983

Cuba	1–1	Trinidad and Tobago

18 August 1983

Cuba	2–1	Barbados

18 August 1983

United States	3–1	Trinidad and Tobago

19 August 1983

United States	3–1	Barbados

19 August 1983

Canada	5–2	Cuba

22 August 1983

United States	2–1	Cuba

22 August 1983

Canada	7–1	Trinidad and Tobago

==== Group B ====
Pos	Team	Pld	W	D	L	GF	GA	GD	Pts	Qualification
1	Argentina	3	3	0	0	13	1	+12	6	Semi-finals
2	Chile	3	2	0	1	10	6	+4	4	Semi-finals
3	Mexico	3	1	0	2	5	5	0	2	Fifth place game
4	Venezuela (H)	3	0	0	3	1	17	−16	0	Seventh place game

Source: TheSports.org
(H) Hosts

15 August 1983

Argentina	5–0	Chile

16 August 1983

Mexico	4–0	Venezuela

18 August 1983

Chile	2–0	Mexico

19 August 1983

Argentina	5–0	Venezuela

22 August 1983

Argentina	3–1	Mexico

22 August 1983

Chile	8–1	Venezuela

=== Fifth to eighth place classification ===
==== Seventh and eighth place ====
25 August 1983

Trinidad and Tobago	1–0	Venezuela

==== Fifth and sixth place ====
25 August 1983

Mexico	3–1	Cuba

=== Medal round ===
Semi-finals
24 August
Canada	3
Chile	0
24 August
Argentina	4
United States	0

Gold medal match
26 August
Canada	3
Argentina	1
Bronze medal match
26 August
Chile	1
United States	0

==== Semi-finals ====
24 August 1983

Canada	3–0	Chile

24 August 1983

Argentina	4–0	United States

==== Bronze medal match ====
26 August 1983

Chile	1–0	United States

==== Gold medal match ====
26 August 1983

Canada	3–1	Argentina

== Final standings ==
1. Canada
2. Argentina
3. Chile
4. United States
5. Mexico
6. Cuba
7. Trinidad and Tobago
8. Venezuela
9. Barbados
