= Field hockey at the 1991 Pan American Games =

- Start date: 3 August 1991
- End date: 15 August 1991
- Teams: 18

Field hockey at the 1991 Pan American Games in Havana took place from 3 to 15 August 1991. Eighteen teams (ten for men and eight for women) competed in the tournament.

== Medal summary ==
Event	Gold	Silver	Bronze
Men's field hockey	Argentina	Canada	United States
Women's field hockey	Argentina	Canada	United States

=== Medal table ===
Rank	Nation	Gold	Silver	Bronze	Total
1	Argentina	2	0	0	2
2	Canada	0	2	0	2
3	United States	0	0	2	2
Totals (3 entries)		2	2	2	6

== Men's tournament ==
Men's field hockey at the 1991 Pan American Games
Tournament details
- Host country: Cuba
- City: Havana
- Dates: 3–15 August
- Teams: 10 (from 1 confederation)

Final positions
- Champions: Argentina (5th title)
- Runner-up: Canada
- Third place: United States

Tournament statistics
- Matches played: 29
- Goals scored: 132 (4.55 per match)

=== Group stage ===
==== Group A ====
Pos	Team	Pld	W	D	L	GF	GA	GD	Pts	Qualification
1	Canada	4	4	0	0	29	0	+29	8	Semi-finals
2	Barbados	4	3	0	1	10	12	−2	6	Semi-finals
3	Cuba (H)	4	2	0	2	11	9	+2	4	5–8th place semi-finals
4	Venezuela	4	0	1	3	3	16	−13	1	5–8th place semi-finals
5	Jamaica	4	0	1	3	4	20	−16	1	Ninth place game

(H) Hosts

3 August 1991

Venezuela	2–2	Jamaica

3 August 1991

Barbados	3–2	Cuba

5 August 1991

Cuba	6–1	Jamaica

5 August 1991

Canada	9–0	Barbados

7 August 1991

Cuba	3–1	Venezuela

7 August 1991

Canada	7–0	Jamaica

9 August 1991

Barbados	5–1	Jamaica

9 August 1991

Canada	9–0	Venezuela

10 August 1991

Barbados	2–0	Venezuela

10 August 1991

Canada	4–0	Cuba

==== Group B ====
Pos	Team	Pld	W	D	L	GF	GA	GD	Pts	Qualification
1	Argentina	4	3	1	0	20	3	+17	7	Semi-finals
2	United States	4	2	2	0	7	3	+4	6	Semi-finals
3	Chile	4	2	1	1	9	8	+1	5	5–8th place semi-finals
4	Trinidad and Tobago	4	1	0	3	2	10	−8	2	5–8th place semi-finals
5	Guyana	4	0	0	4	2	16	−14	0	Ninth place game

3 August 1991

United States	2–0	Trinidad and Tobago

3 August 1991

Chile	3–1	Guyana

5 August 1991

Trinidad and Tobago	1–0	Guyana

5 August 1991

Argentina	5–2	Chile

7 August 1991

United States	3–1	Guyana

7 August 1991

Argentina	5–0	Trinidad and Tobago

9 August 1991

Argentina	1–1	United States

9 August 1991

Chile	3–1	Trinidad and Tobago

10 August 1991

United States	1–1	Chile

10 August 1991

Argentina	9–0	Guyana

=== Ninth to tenth place classification ===
12 August 1991

Jamaica	2–1	Guyana

=== Fifth to eighth place classification ===
5–8th place semi-finals
12 August
Chile	2
Venezuela	0
12 August
Cuba	2
Trinidad and Tobago	1

Fifth place
14 August
Chile	1
Cuba	0
Seventh place
14 August
Trinidad and Tobago	2
Venezuela	0

==== 5–8th place semi-finals ====
12 August 1991

Cuba	2–1	Trinidad and Tobago

12 August 1991

Chile	3–0	Venezuela

==== Seventh place game ====
14 August 1991

Trinidad and Tobago	2–0	Venezuela

==== Fifth place game ====
14 August 1991

Chile	1–0	Cuba

=== Medal round ===
Semi-finals
13 August
Argentina	6
Barbados	0
13 August
Canada	4
United States	2

Gold medal match
15 August
Argentina	3
Canada	0
Bronze medal match
15 August
United States	7
Barbados	1

==== Semi-finals ====
13 August 1991

Canada	4–2	United States

13 August 1991

Argentina	6–0	Barbados

==== Bronze medal match ====
15 August 1991

United States	7–1	Barbados

==== Gold medal match ====
15 August 1991

Argentina	3–0	Canada

=== Final standings ===
Rank	Team
1st place, gold medalist(s)	Argentina
2nd place, silver medalist(s)	Canada
3rd place, bronze medalist(s)	United States
4	Barbados
5	Chile
6	Cuba
7	Trinidad and Tobago
8	Venezuela
9	Jamaica
10	Guyana

Qualified for the 1992 Summer Olympics

Qualified for the 1991 Olympic Qualifier

== Women's tournament ==
Women's field hockey at the 1991 Pan American Games
Tournament details
- Host country: Cuba
- City: Havana
- Dates: 4–15 August
- Teams: 8 (from 1 confederation)

Final positions
- Champions: Argentina (2nd title)
- Runner-up: Canada
- Third place: United States

Tournament statistics
- Matches played: 20
- Goals scored: 70 (3.5 per match)

=== Group stage ===
==== Group A ====
Pos	Team	Pld	W	D	L	GF	GA	GD	Pts	Qualification
1	Argentina	3	3	0	0	14	0	+14	6	Semi-finals
2	Mexico	3	1	1	1	2	3	−1	3	Semi-finals
3	Jamaica	3	0	2	1	0	2	−2	2	5–8th place semi-finals
4	Barbados	3	0	1	2	0	11	−11	1	5–8th place semi-finals

4 August 1991

Jamaica	0–0	Barbados

4 August 1991

Mexico	0–3	Argentina

6 August 1991

Mexico	2–0	Barbados

6 August 1991

Argentina	2–0	Jamaica

8 August 1991

Mexico	0–0	Jamaica

8 August 1991

Argentina	9–0	Barbados

==== Group B ====
Pos	Team	Pld	W	D	L	GF	GA	GD	Pts	Qualification
1	Canada	3	3	0	0	15	0	+15	6	Semi-finals
2	United States	3	2	0	1	6	4	+2	4	Semi-finals
3	Cuba (H)	3	1	0	2	3	12	−9	2	5–8th place semi-finals
4	Trinidad and Tobago	3	0	0	3	2	10	−8	0	5–8th place semi-finals

(H) Hosts

4 August 1991

United States	2–1	Trinidad and Tobago

4 August 1991

Canada	7–0	Cuba

6 August 1991

Cuba	2–1	Trinidad and Tobago

6 August 1991

Canada	2–0	United States

8 August 1991

United States	4–1	Cuba

8 August 1991

Canada	6–0	Trinidad and Tobago

=== Fifth to eighth place classification ===
5–8th place semi-finals
12 August
Jamaica (p.s.)	0 (?) (Note: Unknown score but Jamaica advanced)
Trinidad and Tobago	0 (?)
12 August
Cuba	6
Barbados	2

Fifth place
14 August
Jamaica	2
Cuba	0
Seventh place
14 August
Trinidad and Tobago	4
Barbados	2

==== 5–8th place semi-finals ====
12 August 1991

Jamaica	0–0 (a.e.t.)	Trinidad and Tobago
Penalties
	?–?

12 August 1991

Cuba	6–2	Barbados

==== Seventh place game ====
14 August 1991

Trinidad and Tobago	4–2	Barbados

==== Fifth place game ====
14 August 1991

Jamaica	2–0	Cuba

=== Medal round ===
Semi-finals
12 August
Argentina	2
United States	1
12 August
Canada	2
Mexico	0

Gold medal match
15 August
Argentina (p.s.)	0 (3)
Canada	0 (1)
Bronze medal match
15 August
United States	7
Mexico	0

==== Semi-finals ====
12 August 1991

Canada	2–0	Mexico

12 August 1991

Argentina	2–1	United States

==== Bronze medal match ====
15 August 1991

United States	7–0	Mexico

==== Gold medal match ====
15 August 1991

Argentina	0–0 (a.e.t.)	Canada
Penalties
	3–1

=== Final standings ===
Rank	Team
1st place, gold medalist(s)	Argentina
2nd place, silver medalist(s)	Canada
3rd place, bronze medalist(s)	United States
4	Mexico
5	Jamaica
6	Cuba
7	Trinidad and Tobago
8	Barbados

Qualified for the 1991 Olympic Qualifier
