= Field hockey at the 1975 Pan American Games =

- Start date: 14 October 1975
- End date: 25 October 1975
- Teams: 7

Medalists
Gold medal	Argentina (3rd title)
Silver medal	Canada
Bronze medal	Mexico

The field hockey tournament at the 1975 Pan American Games was the third edition of the field hockey event at the Pan American Games. It took place in Mexico City, Mexico from 14 to 25 October 1975.

The two-time defending champions Argentina won their third gold medal in a row by defeating Canada 1–0 in the final. The hosts Mexico won the bronze medal by defeating Jamaica 2–0.

Event	Gold	Silver	Bronze
Men's field hockey	Argentina	Canada	Mexico

== Results ==
=== Round robin ===
Pos	Team	Pld	W	D	L	GF	GA	GD	Pts	Qualification
1	Argentina	6	5	1	0	30	3	+27	11	Semi-finals
2	Canada	6	4	2	0	17	4	+13	10	Semi-finals
3	Mexico (H)	6	3	1	2	5	9	−4	7	Semi-finals
4	Jamaica	6	2	1	3	5	8	−3	5	Semi-finals
5	Chile	6	1	2	3	6	11	−5	4	Fifth place game
6	United States	6	0	3	3	3	14	−11	3	Fifth place game
7	Guyana	6	0	2	4	3	20	−17	2	

Source: TheSports.org
(H) Hosts

14 October 1975

Mexico	1–1	United States

14 October 1975

Jamaica	4–1	Guyana

14 October 1975

Argentina	5–1	Chile

15 October 1975

Canada	1–1	Guyana

15 October 1975

Mexico	1–0	Jamaica

15 October 1975

Argentina	5–0	United States

16 October 1975

Jamaica	0–0	Chile

16 October 1975

Canada	2–0	Mexico

16 October 1975

Argentina	11–0	Guyana

18 October 1975

Argentina	2–0	Jamaica

18 October 1975

Chile	2–0	Guyana

18 October 1975

Canada	5–0	United States

19 October 1975

Chile	2–2	United States

19 October 1975

Mexico	2–1	Guyana

19 October 1975

Canada	4–0	Jamaica

20 October 1975

United States	0–0	Guyana

20 October 1975

Mexico	1–0	Chile

20 October 1975

Argentina	2–2	Canada

21 October 1975

Jamaica	1–0	United States

21 October 1975

Canada	3–1	Chile

21 October 1975

Argentina	5–0	Mexico

=== Fifth to sixth place classification ===
24 October 1975

Chile	3–2	United States

=== Medal round ===
Semi-finals
24 October
Argentina	8
Jamaica	0
24 October
Canada	3
Mexico	1

Gold medal match
25 October
Argentina	1
Canada	0
Bronze medal match
25 October
Mexico	2
Jamaica	0

==== Semi-finals ====
23 October 1975

Canada	3–1	Mexico

23 October 1975

Argentina	8–0	Jamaica

==== Bronze medal match ====
25 October 1975

Mexico	2–0	Jamaica

==== Gold medal match ====
25 October 1975

Argentina	1–0	Canada

== Final standings ==
1. Argentina
2. Canada
3. Mexico
4. Jamaica
5. Chile
6. United States
7. Guyana
