= United States men's national field hockey team =

United States
- Association: United States Field Hockey Association (USFHA)
- Confederation: PAHF (Americas)
- Head Coach: Allan Law
- Manager: Brian Schledorner
- Captain: Ajai Dhadwal
Home	Away

FIH ranking
- Current: 26 ▲1 (November 6, 2026)
- Highest: 20 (2009 – 2010)
- Lowest: 30 (2008)

Olympic Games
- Appearances: 6 (first in 1932)
- Best result: (bronze) 3rd (1932)

Pan American Games
- Appearances: 15 (first in 1967)
- Best result: 3rd (1967, 1987. 1991, 1995, 2019)

Pan American Cup
- Appearances: 7 (first in 2000)
- Best result: 2nd (2009, 2025)
Medal record
Event	1st	2nd	3rd
Olympic Games	0	0	1
Pan American Games	0	0	5
Pan American Cup	0	2	1
Total	0	2	7
Olympic Games
Bronze medal – third place	1932 Los Angeles	Team
Pan American Games
Bronze medal – third place	1967 Winnipeg	Team
Bronze medal – third place	1987 Indianapolis	Team
Bronze medal – third place	1991 Havana	Team
Bronze medal – third place	1995 Mar del Plata	Team
Bronze medal – third place	2019 Lima	Team
Pan American Cup
Silver medal – second place	2009 Santiago	
Silver medal – second place	2025 Montevideo	
Bronze medal – third place	2017 Lancaster	

The United States men's national field hockey team represents the United States in the international field hockey competitions. The governing body is the United States Field Hockey Association (USFHA), which is a U.S. Olympic Committee organization.

The team won bronze at the 1932 Summer Olympics, and has had success in the Pan American Games and Pan American Cup.

Field hockey is not a major sport at college level for men in the United States, so the men's team does not have as much experience as most other international teams that have professional players. The sport is largely thought of as a women's game in the United States; field hockey has historically been used as a "Title IX" sport to offset the numerous men who play college football, and as such, colleges have typically only sponsored women's field hockey teams. The players on the national team play overseas in European and Australian pro leagues. Despite this, the American team managed to achieve some limited success.

== Tournament history ==
=== Summer Olympics ===
The United States hosted the Olympic field hockey tournaments three times. In their first Olympics in 1932, Team USA hosted India and Japan. With only three teams in the tournament, the U.S. lost both their games and finished third for the bronze medal. The U.S. was the host nation for the Los Angeles 1984 Olympic Games. During group stages, Team USA lost to Australia 2–1. In the 9th-12th place playoff, the U.S. lost to Kenya in sudden death penalty strokes 6-5 after a 1-1 regulation and then lost 11th/12th place game to Malaysia 9–8 in sudden death penalty strokes after 3–3 tie in regulation. The team finished last in tournament play. At the Atlanta 1996 Olympic Games, the squad finished last again.

- 1932 – (bronze)
- 1936 – 11th place
- 1948 – 11th place
- 1956 – 12th place
- 1984 – 12th place
- 1996 – 12th place

=== FIH Hockey World Cup ===
The U.S. team has never qualified for an outdoor World Cup. However, the team has competed twice for the indoor World Cup, most recently in 2011.

=== Pan American Games ===
Finishing 5th at the 2015 Pan American Games, the U.S. missed out on qualifying for the Rio 2016 Olympic Games.

- 1967 – (bronze)
- 1971 – 5th place
- 1975 – 6th place
- 1979 – 6th place
- 1983 – 4th place
- 1987 – (bronze)
- 1991 – (bronze)
- 1995 – (bronze)
- 1999 – 5th place
- 2003 – 5th place
- 2007 – 7th place
- 2011 – 5th place
- 2015 – 5th place
- 2019 – (bronze)
- 2023 – 4th place

=== Pan American Cup ===
The U.S. missed out on the final of the 2009 Men's Pan American Cup from a missed penalty stroke in normal time. Had the penalty been converted the team would have won the final vs. Canada for direct qualification to the World Cup. As it was, they lost in overtime on a golden goal and Canada went to the 2010 World Cup in India.

Pan American Cup record
Year	Host	Round	Position	Pld	W	D*	L	GF	GA
2000	Havana, Cuba	5th place game	5th	6	4	0	2	19	11
2004	London, Canada	7th place game	7th	7	4	0	3	42	12
2009	Santiago, Chile	Final	2nd	5	3	0	2	16	14
2013	Brampton, Canada	3rd place game	4th	5	2	0	3	16	14
2017	Lancaster, United States	3rd place game	3rd	5	3	1	1	12	8
2022	Santiago, Chile	3rd place game	4th	5	3	1	1	16	8
2025	Montevideo, Uruguay	Final	2nd	5	3	1	1	8	15
Total		Best: 2nd	7/7	38	22	3	13	129	82

=== Hockey World League ===
In 2016, the U.S. competed in FIH Hockey World League Round 1 in Salamanca, Mexico. The U.S. put in a dominant performance to finish undefeated and as FIH Hockey World League round 1 champions to secure a spot at FIH Hockey World League round 2 in March 2017. The 6–1 win over Barbados added to U.S.'s 33 goals while only allowing 2 over the 4 match tournament. Going into the final, the U.S. was familiar with their opponent as they had played Barbados in the first game and came out on top with a 3–1 victory. With the roster that was representing the United States, the squad kept developing their play throughout the week culminating in a dominant performance in the final. Team USA finished third in Round 2 and didn't make it to the semifinal Round of the 2016–17 Men's FIH Hockey World League.

- 2012–13 – 28th place
- 2014–15 – 30th place
- 2016–17 – 21st place

=== FIH Hockey Nations Cup ===
- 2025–26 – 8th place
- 2026–27 – Qualified

=== Sultan Azlan Shah Cup ===
- 2026 –

=== Champions Challenge II ===
- 2011 – 7th place

== Players ==
=== Current squad ===
The following 16 players were named on July 9, 2019 for the 2019 Pan American Games in Lima, Peru.

Head coach: Rutger Wiese

Caps updated as of August 10, 2019, after the match against Chile.

No.	Pos.	Player	Date of birth (age)	Caps	Club
1	GK	Jonathan Klages	May 14, 1997 (age 29)	30	(Spain) Atletico San Sebastián
7	DF	Tom Barratt	August 6, 1991 (age 35)	78	(England) Beeston
9	DF	Adam Miller	March 15, 1992 (age 34)	73	(England) Oxted
14	DF	Aki Käppeler	July 10, 1994 (age 32)	71	(Germany) TSV Mannheim
22	DF	Johnny Orozco	February 18, 1993 (age 33)	95	
3	MF	Michael Barminski	February 11, 1993 (age 33)	87	(United States) Ventura Roadrunners
12	MF	Ajai Dhadwal (Captain)	August 13, 1993 (age 33)	119	
18	MF	Paul Singh	March 11, 1993 (age 33)	80	(United States) LA Tigers
20	MF	Sean Cicchi	March 23, 1995 (age 31)	73	(United States) Conejo Bulldogs
26	MF	Mohan Gandhi	March 17, 1993 (age 33)	98	(England) Beeston
4	FW	Tyler Sundeen	December 21, 1993 (age 32)	109	(United States) LA Tigers
5	FW	Pat Harris	March 13, 1985 (age 41)	150	(Germany) Mannheimer HC
10	FW	Alberto Montilla	January 24, 1998 (age 28)	13	(United States) Bulldogs
15	FW	Kei Käppeler	June 17, 1997 (age 29)	24	(Germany) TSV Mannheim
17	FW	Christian DeAngelis	February 13, 1999 (age 27)	32	(United States) WC Eagles
21	FW	Deegan Huisman	October 29, 1997 (age 29)	27	(Netherlands) Almere

== Results and fixtures ==
The following is a list of match results in the last 12 months, as well as any future matches that have been scheduled.

Win Draw Loss Fixture

=== 2026 ===
==== 2026 Men's FIH Hockey World Cup Qualifiers ====
1 March 2026 Pool A	Egypt	3–1	United States	Ismailia, Egypt
20:45	El-Ganaini 10'; Atef 22'; Mohsen 52'	Report	A. Käppeler 6'	Stadium: Suez Canal Stadium

2 March 2026 Pool A	Japan	4–0	United States	Ismailia, Egypt
18:45	Matsumoto 3'; Yamasaki 23'; Ooka 28'; Kimura 56'	Report		Stadium: Suez Canal Stadium

4 March 2026 Pool A	England	5–0 (Note: The United States withdrew after two matches because of an official advisory from the US State Department due to the 2026 Iran war.)	United States	Ismailia, Egypt
18:45		Report		Stadium: Suez Canal Stadium

6 March 2026 5/8 Classification	China	Cancelled	United States	Ismailia, Egypt
09:00		Report		Stadium: Suez Canal Stadium

7 March 2026 7/8 Classification	Austria	Cancelled	United States	Ismailia, Egypt
09:00		Report		Stadium: Suez Canal Stadium

==== 2026 FIH Nations Cup ====
11 June 2026 Pool B	Ireland	3–0	United States	Cape Town, South Africa
16:45	Johnson 17'; Williams 28'; Gibson 48'	Report		Stadium: Hartleyvale Stadium

13 June 2026 Pool B	South Africa	4–0	United States	Cape Town, South Africa
17:00	Davis 13'; Mthalane 36', 53'; Melville 59'	Report		Stadium: Hartleyvale Stadium

16 June 2026 Pool B	France	4–1	United States	Cape Town, South Africa
16:45	Esmenjaud 12'; Charlet 33', 35', 57'	Report	Charasika 14'	Stadium: Hartleyvale Stadium

19 June 2026 5/8 Classification	Malaysia	4–2	United States	Cape Town, South Africa
12:15	Anuar 33'; Azrai 39'; Saari 52'; Harizan 55'	Report	Charasika 5'; Montilla 17'	Stadium: Hartleyvale Stadium

20 June 2026 7/8 Classification	United States	1–5	Ireland	Cape Town, South Africa
12:15	Charasika 29'	Report	B. Nelson 12', 28'; Empey 20'; G. Williams 44'; M. Nelson 58'	Stadium: Hartleyvale Stadium

==== Test Series ====
29 June 2026 Test 1	Canada	3–3 (5–4 p)	United States	Surrey, British Columbia, Canada
19:00	Guraliuk 19'; Nicholson 21'; Davis 41'	Report	Charasika 10', 46'; Leser 29'	Stadium: Tamanawis Park
	Penalties
	Davis (penalty shoot-out scored); Thind (penalty shoot-out scored); Harris (penalty shoot-out scored); H. Sidhu (penalty shoot-out missed); J. Sidhu (penalty shoot-out scored); Thind (penalty shoot-out scored)		(penalty shoot-out scored) Charasika; (penalty shoot-out scored) Johal; (penalty shoot-out scored) Montilla; (penalty shoot-out missed) Leser; (penalty shoot-out scored) Katz; (penalty shoot-out missed) Charasika

30 June 2026 Test 2	United States	2–0	Canada	Surrey, British Columbia, Canada
19:00	Charasika 9'; Bleeker 15'	Report		Stadium: Tamanawis Park

2 July 2026 Test 3	Canada	3–0	United States	Surrey, British Columbia, Canada
16:00	Thind 15', 26'; Sarmento 52'	Report		Stadium: Tamanawis Park

==== Sultan Azlan Shah Cup ====
20 November 2026 Round Robin	Australia	5–1	United States	Ipoh, Malaysia
15:00	Geddes 3'; Ephraums 11', 15', 49'; Welch 39'	Report	Grewal 43'	Stadium: Azlan Shah Stadium

21 November 2026 Round Robin	United States	1–5	Pakistan	Ipoh, Malaysia
15:00	Charasika 31'	Report	Rana 18'; Sufyan 21'; M. Ammad 32'; Mahmood 46'; Shahid 58'	Stadium: Azlan Shah Stadium

23 November 2026 Round Robin	United States	v	Malaysia	Ipoh, Malaysia
19:30				Stadium: Azlan Shah Stadium

24 November 2026 Round Robin	Canada	v	United States	Ipoh, Malaysia
17:15				Stadium: Azlan Shah Stadium

26 November 2026 Round Robin	South Korea	v	United States	Ipoh, Malaysia
17:15				Stadium: Azlan Shah Stadium

== See also ==
- United States women's national field hockey team
- USA Field Hockey
- USA Field Hockey Hall of Fame
